= List of Spanish films of 1996 =

A list of Spanish-produced and co-produced feature films released in Spain in 1996. The domestic theatrical release date is favoured.

== Films ==
Release		Title (Domestic title)	Cast & Crew	Ref.
J A N U A R Y	19	Hi, Are You Alone? (Hola, ¿estás sola?)	Director: Iciar Bollain Cast: Silke, Candela Peña, Álex Angulo, Elena Irureta, Arcadi Levin	
J A N U A R Y	24	Familia	Director: Fernando León de Aranoa Cast: Juan Luis Galiardo, Amparo Muñoz, Ágata Lys, Chete Lera, Elena Anaya, Raquel Rodrigo, Juan Querol, Aníbal Carbonero, André Falcon, Béatrice Camurat	
F E B R U A R Y	2	Alma gitana	Director: Chus Gutiérrez Cast: Amara Carmona, Pedro Alonso	
F E B R U A R Y	2	Amores que matan	Director: Juan Manuel Chumilla-Carbajosa Cast: Carmen Maura, Juanjo Puigcorbé, Lucina Gil, Jean-Pierre Cassel, Rafael Álvarez "el Brujo"	
F E B R U A R Y	9	La sal de la vida	Director: Eugenio Martín Cast: Patxi Andión, Yvonne Reyes, Juan Diego Botto	
F E B R U A R Y	16	Éxtasis	Director: Mariano Barroso Cast: Javier Bardem, Federico Luppi, Silvia Munt, Daniel Guzmán, Leire Berrocal, Juan Diego Botto	
F E B R U A R Y	23	Gran slalom	Director: Jaime Chávarri Cast: Juanjo Puigcorbé, Laura del Sol, Santiago Ramos, Joaquín Kremel, Pilar Bardem, Pepa López, Enrique San Francisco, Fernando Guillén Cuervo	
M A R C H	8	Cachito	Director: Enrique Urbizu Cast: Sancho Gracia, Jorge Perugorría, Amara Carmona	
A P R I L	12	Thesis (Tesis)	Director: Alejandro Amenábar Cast: Ana Torrent, Eduardo Noriega, Fele Martínez	
A P R I L	12	Malena Is a Name from a Tango (Malena es un nombre de tango)	Director: Gerardo Herrero Cast: Ariadna Gil, Marta Belaustegui, Carlos López, Luis Fernando Alvés, Isabel Otero	
A P R I L	12	Gimlet	Director: José Luis Acosta Cast: Ángela Molina, Viggo Mortensen, Abel Folk, Pep Cruz, Blanca Pàmpols, Jordi Boixaderas	
A P R I L	19	Libertarias	Director: Vicente Aranda Cast: Ana Belén, Ariadna Gil, Loles León, Jorge Sanz, María Pujalte, Blanca Apilánez, María Galiana, Ángeles Martín, Patricia Vico	
A P R I L	26	Brujas	Director: Álvaro Fernández Armero Cast: Beatriz Carvajal, Ana Álvarez, Penélope Cruz	
A P R I L	26	La leyenda de Balthasar el castrado	Director: Juan Miñón Cast: Imanol Arias, Coque Malla, Aitana Sánchez-Gijón	
M A Y	3	Things I Never Told You (Cosas que nunca te dije)	Director: Isabel Coixet Cast: Lili Taylor, Andrew McCarthy	
M A Y	17	África	Director: Alfonso Ungría Cast: Zoe Berriatúa, Elena Anaya, Imanol Arias, Julie Carmen	
M A Y	24	Earth (Tierra)	Director:Julio Medem Cast: Carmelo Gómez, Emma Suárez, Karra Elejalde, Silke	
M A Y	24	Killer Barbys	Director: Jess Franco Cast: Santiago Segura, Charlie S. Chaplin, Aldo Sambrell, Silvia Superstar, Mariangela Giordano, Angie Barea, Carlos Subterfuge, Billy King	
J U L Y	12	Corsarios del chip	Director: Rafael Alcázar Cast: Karra Elejalde, Fernando Guillén Cuervo, Cayetana Guillén Cuervo, Paulina Gálvez, Lola Baldrich, Fernando Guillén, Ángel de Andrés López	
J U L Y	19	Aquí llega Condemor, el pecador de la pradera	Director: Álvaro Sáenz de Heredia Cast: Chiquito de la Calzada, Bigote Arrocet, Sol Abad, Naïm Thomas	
A U G U S T	3	Un asunto privado	Director: Imanol Arias Cast: Jorge Perugorría, Antonio Valero, Pastora Vega	
A U G U S T	9	Suburbs (Adosados)	Director: Mario Camus Cast: Antonio Valero, Ana Duato, Jaume Valls, Lluís Homar, Boris Nevzorov	
A U G U S T	23	Pon un hombre en tu vida	Director: Eva Lesmes Cast: Toni Cantó, Cristina Marcos, Pere Ponce, Anabel Alonso, Javier Cámara	
A U G U S T	23	Demasiado caliente para ti	Director: Javier Elorrieta Cast: Andoni Ferreño, Dayrein Aba, José Luis López Vázquez, Agustín González, Nancho Novo, Ángeles Martín, Kimbo	
S E P T E M B E R	13	I Have a House (Tengo una casa)	Director: Mónica Laguna Cast: Nancho Novo, Silke, Pedro Alonso, Ernesto Alterio	
S E P T E M B E R	20	Carla's Song (La canción de Carla)	Director: Ken Loach	
S E P T E M B E R	27	Your Name Poisons My Dreams (Tu nombre envenena mis sueños)	Director: Pilar Miró Cast: Carmelo Gómez, Emma Suárez, Ángel de Andrés, Anabel Alonso, Toni Cantó	
S E P T E M B E R	27	Bwana	Director: Imanol Uribe Cast: Andrés Pajares, María Barranco, Emilio Buale	
O C T O B E R	11	Taxi	Director: Carlos Saura Cast: Ingrid Rubio, Carlos Fuentes, Ángel de Andrés López	
O C T O B E R	11	Best-seller, el premio	Director: Carlos Pérez Ferré Cast: Karra Elejalde, Ana Álvarez, Féodor Atkine, Gemma Cuervo	
O C T O B E R	18	Robert Rylands' Last Journey (El último viaje de Robert Rylands)	Director: Gracia Querejeta Cast: Ben Cross, Cathy Underwood, Kenneth Colley, Gary Piquer, Perdita Weeks, Lalita Ahmed, Maurice Denham, William Franklyn	
O C T O B E R	25	Bambola	Director: Bigas Luna Cast: Manuel Bandera, Valeria Marini, Stefano Dionisi, Jorge Perugorría	
N O V E M B E R	8	La Celestina	Director: Gerardo Vera Cast: Penélope Cruz, Juan Diego Botto, Maribel Verdú, Terele Pávez, Jordi Mollá, Nancho Novo, Nathalie Seseña, Carlos Fuentes, Candela Peña, Anna Lizaran, Sergio Villanueva, Ángel de Andrés López, Lluís Homar	
N O V E M B E R	8	Calor... y celos	Director: Javier Rebollo Cast: Fernando Guillén Cuervo, Elvira Mínguez, Leire Berrocal, Antonio Resines, Ana Obregón	
N O V E M B E R	15	Killer Tongue (La lengua asesina)	Director: Alberto Sciamma Cast: Melinda Clarke, Jason Durr, Mapi Galán, Mabel Karr, Robert Englund	
N O V E M B E R	15	Not Love, Just Frenzy (Más que amor, frenesí)	Director: Alfonso Albacete, David Menkes, Miguel Bardem Cast: Nancho Novo, Cayetana Guillén Cuervo, Ingrid Rubio, Beatriz Santiago, Gustavo Salmerón, Javier Manrique, Javier Albalá, Liberto Rabal, Bibi Andersen, Juan Diego Botto	
N O V E M B E R	22	Passages (Pasajes)	Director: Daniel Calparsoro Cast: Najwa Nimri, Alfredo Villa, Ion Gabella, Charo López	
N O V E M B E R	22	Fotos	Director: Elio Quiroga Cast: Gustavo Salmerón, Mercedes Ortega, Miky Molina, Diana Peñalver, Myriam de Maeztu, Miguel Alonso, Carmelo Alcántara, Amparo Muñoz, Simón Andreu, María Asquerino	
N O V E M B E R	27	The Dog in the Manger (El perro del hortelano)	Director: Pilar Miró Cast: Emma Suárez, Carmelo Gómez	
D E C E M B E R	13	The Good Life (La buena vida)	Director: David Trueba Cast: Fernando Ramallo, Lucía Jiménez	
D E C E M B E R	20	Beyond the Garden (Más allá del jardín)	Director: Pedro Olea Cast: Concha Velasco, Fernando Guillén, Manuel Bandera, Ingrid Rubio, Miguel Hermoso, Andrea Occhipinti, Mary Carrillo, Claudia Gravy, Rosa Novell, Maribel Quiñones "Martirio", Giancarlo Giannini	
D E C E M B E R	20	Katuwira (Donde nacen y mueren los sueños)	Director: Íñigo Vallejo-Nájera Cast: Gabriela Roel, Damián Alcázar, Bruno Bichir	
D E C E M B E R	27	Un cos al bosc	Director: Joaquim Jordà Cast: Rossy de Palma, Ricard Borràs, Núria Prims	

== Box office ==
The ten highest-grossing Spanish films in 1996, by domestic box office gross revenue, are as follows:

Highest-grossing films of 1996
Rank	Title	Distributor	Admissions	Domestic gross (€)
1	Two Much	Sogepaq	754,303	2,217,968
2	The Day of the Beast (El día de la bestia) ‡	Sogepaq	732,481	2,108,556
3	Libertarias	Sogepaq	576,874	1,851,512
4	Aquí llega Condemor, el pecador de la pradera	Buena Vista International	556,177	1,628,095
5	Malena Is a Name from a Tango (Malena es un nombre de tango)	Alta Films	338,580	1,127,570
6	La Celestina	Sogepaq	320,972	1,079,597
7	Hi, Are You Alone? (Hola, ¿estás sola?)	Alta Films	294,850	982,612
8	Extasis (Éxtasis)	Alta Films	288,004	927,016
9	The Dog in the Manger (El perro del hortelano)	Columbia TriStar	287,094	993,291
10	The Butterfly Effect (El efecto mariposa) ‡	United International Pictures	263,755	753,179
‡: 1995 theatrical opening

== See also ==
- 11th Goya Awards
