= Goya Award for Best Film =

Annual award by the Spanish Film Academy

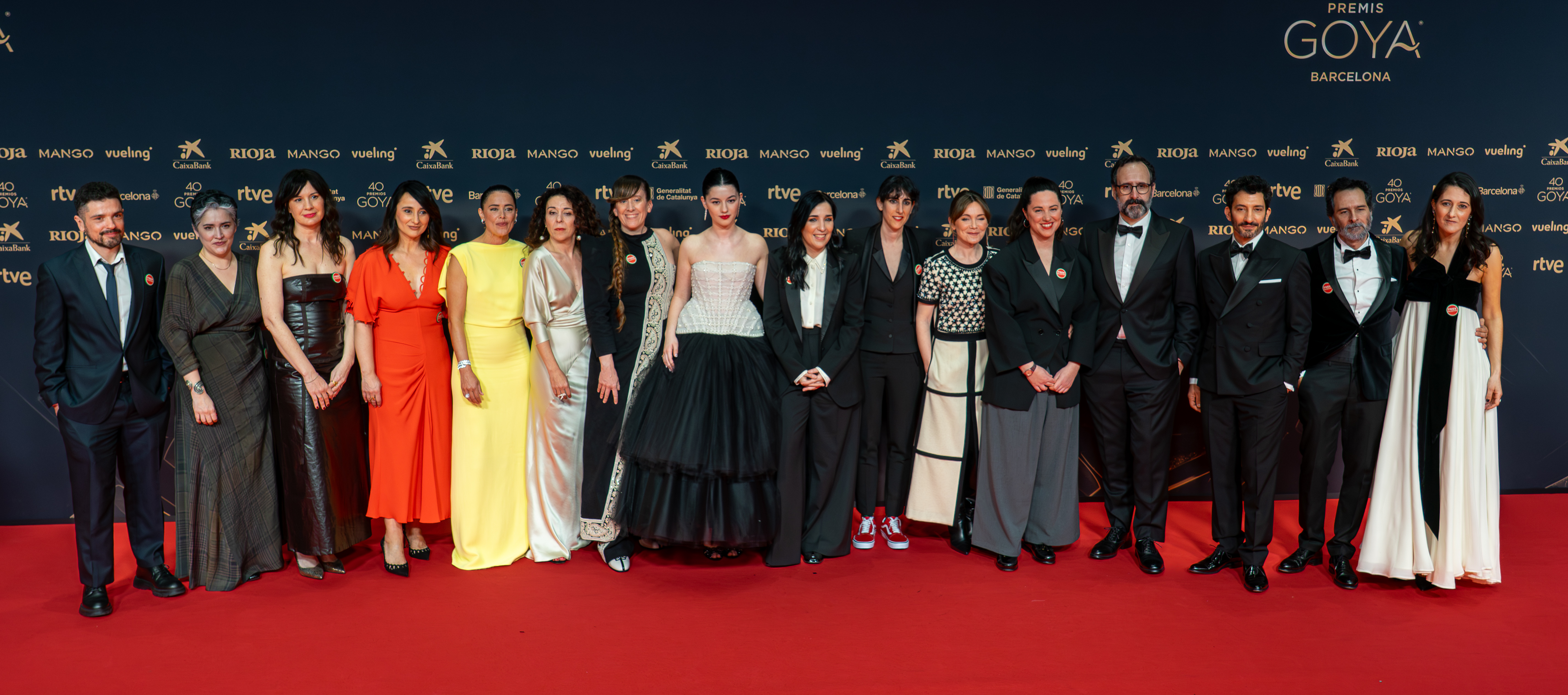
- Cast and crew members of Sundays, the 2026 winner
- Native name: Premio Goya a la mejor película
- Awarded for: Best Spanish film of the year
- Country: Spain
- Presented by: Academy of Cinematographic Arts and Sciences of Spain (AACCE)
- First award: 1st Goya Awards (1986)
- Most recent winner: Sundays (2025)
- Website: Official website

The Goya Award for Best Picture (Spanish: Premio Goya a la mejor película) is one of the Goya Awards presented annually by the Academy of Cinematographic Arts and Sciences of Spain (AACCE) since the awards debuted in 1986. The Best Picture category is traditionally the final award of the night and is widely considered the most prestigious honor of the ceremony.

== Winners and nominees ==
In the list below the winner of the award for each year is shown first, followed by the other nominees.

=== 1980s ===
Year	English title	Original title	Director(s)	Producer(s)
1986 (1st)	Voyage to Nowhere	El viaje a ninguna parte	Fernando Fernán Gómez	Ganesh
1986 (1st)	27 Hours	27 horas	Montxo Armendáriz	Elías Querejeta
1986 (1st)	Half of Heaven	La mitad del cielo	Manuel Gutiérrez Aragón	Luis Megino
1987 (2nd)	The Enchanted Forest	El bosque animado	José Luis Cuerda	Classic Films
1987 (2nd)	Divine Words	Divinas palabras	José Luis García Sánchez	Lola 2002, Ion Producciones
1987 (2nd)	El Lute: Run for Your Life	El Lute: camina o revienta	Vicente Aranda	Multivídeo
1988 (3rd)	Women on the Verge of a Nervous Breakdown	Mujeres al borde de un ataque de nervios	Pedro Almodóvar	El Deseo, Lauren Films
1988 (3rd)	Rowing with the Wind	Remando al viento	Gonzalo Suárez	Ditirambo Films, Viking Films
1988 (3rd)	The Tunnel	El túnel	Antonio Drove	Santiago Cinematográfica
1988 (3rd)	Wait for Me in Heaven	Espérame en el cielo	Antonio Mercero	B.M.G. Films
1988 (3rd)	Winter Diary	Diario de invierno	Francisco Regueiro	Castor Films
1989 (4th)	Twisted Obsession	El sueño del mono loco	Fernando Trueba	X Y Z Desarrollos, French Production, International Production, Sofica Valor
1989 (4th)	Esquilache		Josefina Molina	Sabre Films
1989 (4th)	Montoyas y Tarantos	Montoyas y Tarantos	Vicente Escrivá	C.V.C
1989 (4th)	Moon Child	El niño de la luna	Agustí Villaronga	Ganesh
1989 (4th)	The Sea and the Weather	El mar y el tiempo	Fernando Fernán Gómez	Ion Producciones

=== 1990s ===
Year	English title	Original title	Director(s)	Producer(s)
1990 (5th)	¡Ay Carmela!		Carlos Saura	Iberoamericana Films, Ellepi Films
1990 (5th)	Letters from Alou	Las cartas de Alou	Montxo Armendáriz	Elías Querejeta
1990 (5th)	Tie Me Up! Tie Me Down!	¡Átame!	Pedro Almodóvar	El Deseo
1991 (6th)	Lovers	Amantes	Vicente Aranda	Pedro Costa
1991 (6th)	Don Juan in Hell	Don Juan en los infiernos	Gonzalo Suárez	Ditirambo Films
1991 (6th)	The Dumbfounded King	El rey pasmado	Imanol Uribe	Siete Films, Ariane Films, Arion Productions, Infor Filmes
1992 (7th)	Belle Époque		Fernando Trueba	Fernando Trueba, Lolafilms
1992 (7th)	The Fencing Master	El maestro de esgrima	Pedro Olea	Altube Filmeak, Origen P.C.
1992 (7th)	A Tale of Ham and Passion	Jamón, jamón	Bigas Luna	Lolafilms, Ovideo
1993 (8th)	Everyone to Jail	Todos a la cárcel	Luis García Berlanga	Sogetel, Central de Producciones Audiovisuales, Antea Films
1993 (8th)	Intruder	Intruso	Vicente Aranda	Pedro Costa
1993 (8th)	Shadows in a Conflict	Sombras en una batalla	Mario Camus	Cayo Largo Films
1994 (9th)	Running Out of Time	Días contados	Imanol Uribe	Aiete Films, Ariane Films
1994 (9th)	Cradle Song	Canción de cuna	José Luis Garci	Nickel Odeon Dos
1994 (9th)	Turkish Passion	La pasión turca	Vicente Aranda	Lolafilms, Cartel
1995 (10th)	Nobody Will Speak of Us When We're Dead	Nadie hablará de nosotras cuando hayamos muerto	Agustín Díaz Yanes	Flamenco Films, Xaloc
1995 (10th)	The Day of the Beast	El día de la bestia	Álex de la Iglesia	Sogetel, Iberoamericana Films, M.G.S.R.L.
1995 (10th)	Mouth to Mouth	Boca a boca	Manuel Gómez Pereira	Boca a Boca Producciones, Sogetel
1996 (11th)	Thesis	Tesis	Alejandro Amenábar	Las Producciones del Escorpión
1996 (11th)	The Dog in the Manger	El perro del hortelano	Pilar Miró	Enrique Cerezo, Cartel, Lolafilms
1996 (11th)	Bwana		Imanol Uribe	Origen, Aurum, Cartel
1997 (12th)	The Lucky Star	La buena estrella	Ricardo Franco	Enrique Cerezo, Pedro Costa
1997 (12th)	Martín (Hache)	Martín (Hache)	Adolfo Aristarain	Tornasol Films, Adolfo Aristarain
1997 (12th)	Secrets of the Heart	Secretos del corazón	Montxo Armendáriz	Aiete Films, Ariane Films
1998 (13th)	The Girl of Your Dreams	La niña de tus ojos	Fernando Trueba	Cartel, Fernando Trueba, Lolafilms
1998 (13th)	Barrio		Fernando León de Aranoa	Sociedad General de Cine, Elías Querejeta, Mact Productions, MGN Filmes
1998 (13th)	The Grandfather	El abuelo	José Luis Garci	Nickel Odeon Dos
1998 (13th)	Open Your Eyes	Abre los ojos	Alejandro Amenábar	Sociedad General de Cine, Las Producciones del Escorpión, Alain Sarde, Lucky Red
1999 (14th)	All About My Mother	Todo sobre mi madre	Pedro Almodóvar	El Deseo, Rend Productions, France2 Cinema
1999 (14th)	Alone	Solas	Benito Zambrano	Maestranza Films
1999 (14th)	Butterfly	La lengua de las mariposas	José Luis Cuerda	Las Producciones del Escorpión, Sogetel
1999 (14th)	By My Side Again	Cuando vuelvas a mi lado	Gracia Querejeta	SOGECINE, Elías Querejeta, Albares Productions

=== 2000s ===
Year	English title	Original title	Director(s)	Producer(s)
2000 (15th)	Pellet	El bola	Achero Mañas	Tesela
2000 (15th)	Common Wealth	La comunidad	Álex de la Iglesia	Lolafilms
2000 (15th)	Leo		José Luis Borau	El Imán Cine y Televisión
2000 (15th)	You're the One	Una historia de entonces	José Luis Garci	Nickel Odeón Dos, Enrique Cerezo
2001 (16th)	The Others	Los otros	Alejandro Amenábar	SOGECINE, Las Producciones del Escorpión
2001 (16th)	Don't Tempt Me	Sin noticias de Dios	Agustín Díaz Yanes	Flamenco Films, Tornasol Films, Cartel, Ensueño Films, Telemadrid
2001 (16th)	Mad Love	Juana la Loca	Vicente Aranda	Enrique Cerezo
2001 (16th)	Sex and Lucia	Lucía y el sexo	Julio Medem	SOGECINE
2002 (17th)	Mondays in the Sun	Los lunes al sol	Fernando León de Aranoa	Elías Querejeta, Mediapro
2002 (17th)	The City of No Limits	En la ciudad sin límites	Antonio Hernández	Zebra Producciones Icónica, Patagonik Film Group
2002 (17th)	The Other Side of the Bed	El otro lado de la cama	Emilio Martínez Lázaro	Telespan 2000, Impala
2002 (17th)	Talk to Her	Hable con ella	Pedro Almodóvar	El Deseo
2003 (18th)	Take My Eyes	Te doy mis ojos	Icíar Bollaín	Producciones La Iguana, Alta Producción
2003 (18th)	The 4th Floor	Planta 4ª	Antonio Mercero	Bocaboca Producciones
2003 (18th)	My Life Without Me	Mi vida sin mí	Isabel Coixet	El Deseo, Milestones Productions
2003 (18th)	Soldiers of Salamina	Soldados de Salamina	David Trueba	LolaFilms, Fernando Trueba
2004 (19th)	The Sea Inside	Mar adentro	Alejandro Amenábar	SOGECINE, Himenóptero, UGC Images, Eyescreen
2004 (19th)	Bad Education	La mala educación	Pedro Almodóvar	El Deseo
2004 (19th)	Roma	Roma	Adolfo Aristarain	Tesela, Aristarain
2004 (19th)	Tiovivo c. 1950	Tiovivo c. 1950	José Luis Garci	Enrique Cerezo, Productora Cinematográfica Veintinueve, Nickel Odeón Dos
2005 (20th)	The Secret Life of Words	La vida secreta de las palabras	Isabel Coixet	El Deseo, Mediapro
2005 (20th)	7 Virgins	7 vírgenes	Alberto Rodríguez	Tesela Producciones Cinematográficas, La Zanfoña Producciones
2005 (20th)	Obaba		Montxo Armendáriz	Oria Films, Pandora Film, Neue Impuls Films
2005 (20th)	Princesas		Fernando León de Aranoa	Reposado Producciones Cinematográficas
2006 (21st)	Volver		Pedro Almodóvar	El Deseo
2006 (21st)	Alatriste		Agustín Díaz Yanes	Estudios Picasso Fábrica de Ficción, Origen, NBC Universal Global Networks España
2006 (21st)	Pan's Labyrinth	El laberinto del fauno	Guillermo del Toro	Estudios Picasso Fábrica de Ficción, Tequila Gang, Esperanto Filmok
2006 (21st)	Salvador	Salvador (Puig Antich)	Manuel Huerga	Mediapro, Future Films
2007 (22nd)	Solitary Fragments	La soledad	Jaime Rosales	Fresdeval Films, Wanda Visión, In Vitro Films
2007 (22nd)	13 Roses	Las 13 rosas	Emilio Martínez Lázaro	Enrique Cerezo, Pedro Costa
2007 (22nd)	The Orphanage	El orfanato	Juan Antonio Bayona	Rodar y Rodar, Telecinco Cinema
2007 (22nd)	Seven Billiard Tables	Siete mesas de billar francés	Gracia Querejeta	Elías Querejeta, Ensueño Films, Enrique Cerezo
2008 (23rd)	Camino		Javier Fesser	Mediaproducción, Películas Pendelton
2008 (23rd)	The Blind Sunflowers	Los girasoles ciegos	José Luis Cuerda	Sociedad General de Cine, Producciones a Modiño, Estudios Organizativos y Proyectos Cinematográficos, Producciones Labarouta
2008 (23rd)	Just Walking	Sólo quiero caminar	Agustín Díaz Yanes	Boomerang T.V., Antena 3 Films, Canana Films
2008 (23rd)	The Oxford Murders	Los crímenes de Oxford	Álex de la Iglesia	Tornasol, Telecinco Cinema
2009 (24th)	Cell 211	Celda 211	Daniel Monzón	Álvaro Augustín, Emma Lustres, Borja Pena, Juan Gordon
2009 (24th)	Agora	Ágora	Alejandro Amenábar	Álvaro Augustín, Fernando Bovaira, Pablo Alfaro, Simón de Santiago, Alejandro Amenábar
2009 (24th)	The Dancer and the Thief	El baile de la victoria	Fernando Trueba	Fernando Trueba
2009 (24th)	The Secret in Their Eyes	El secreto de sus ojos	Juan José Campanella	Vanesa Ragone, Gerardo Herrero

=== 2010s ===
Year	English title	Original title	Director(s)	Producer(s)
2010 (25th)	Black Bread	Pa negre	Agustí Villaronga	Isona Passola, Elisa Plaza
2010 (25th)	The Last Circus	Balada triste de trompeta	Álex de la Iglesia	Gerardo Herrero, Franck Ribiere, Verane Frediani
2010 (25th)	Buried	Buried (Enterrado)	Rodrigo Cortés	Adrián Guerra, Alejandro Miranda
2010 (25th)	Even the Rain	También la lluvia	Icíar Bollaín	Juan Gordon, Mónica Lozano, Eric Altmayer
2011 (26th)	No Rest for the Wicked	No habrá paz para los malvados	Enrique Urbizu	Alvaro Augustin, Gonzalo Salazar-Simpson
2011 (26th)	Blackthorn		Mateo Gil	Andrés Santana, Ibon Cormenzana
2011 (26th)	The Skin I Live In	La piel que habito	Pedro Almodóvar	Agustín Almodóvar, Esther García
2011 (26th)	The Sleeping Voice	La voz dormida	Benito Zambrano	Antonio Pérez Pérez
2012 (27th)	Blancanieves		Pablo Berger	Ángel Durández, Jérôme Vidal, Ibon Cormenzana
2012 (27th)	The Artist and the Model	El artista y la modelo	Fernando Trueba	Cristina Huete
2012 (27th)	Unit 7	Grupo 7	Alberto Rodríguez	José Antonio Félez Aznar
2012 (27th)	The Impossible	Lo imposible	Juan Antonio Bayona	Álvaro Agustin, Ghislain Barrois, Enrique López Lavigne, Belén Atienza
2013 (28th)	Living Is Easy with Eyes Closed	Vivir es fácil con los ojos cerrados	David Trueba	Cristina Huete
2013 (28th)	15 Years and One Day	15 años y un día	Gracia Querejeta	Gerardo Herrero
2013 (28th)	Cannibal	Caníbal	Manuel Martín Cuenca	Alejandro Hernández, Manuel Martín Cuenca, Fernando Bovaira, Simón de Santiago
2013 (28th)	Family United	La gran familia española	Daniel Sánchez Arévalo	Mercedes Gamero, José Antonio Feléz, Fernando Bovaira
2013 (28th)	Wounded	La herida	Fernando Franco	Koldo Zuazua, Mario Madueño Cobo, Samuel Martínez, Roberto Butragueño Sánchez, Manuel Calvo, Fernando Franco
2014 (29th)	Marshland	La isla mínima	Alberto Rodríguez	Mikel Lejarza, Mercedes Gamero, José Antonio Félez, Gervasio Iglesias
2014 (29th)	El Niño		Daniel Monzón	Edmon Roch, Álvaro Augustin, Ghislain Barrois, Javier Ugarte, Borja Pena, Franck Ribière
2014 (29th)	Loreak (Flowers)	Loreak	Jon Garaño, Jose Mari Goenaga	Xabier Berzosa, Fernando Larrondo, Iñigo Obeso, Aitor Arregi, Iñaki Gómez
2014 (29th)	Wild Tales	Relatos salvajes	Damián Szifrón	Hugo Sigman, Matías Mosteirín, Agustín Almodóvar, Pedro Almodóvar, Esther García
2014 (29th)	Magical Girl		Carlos Vermut	Pedro Hernández Santos
2015 (30th)	Truman		Cesc Gay	Marta Esteban, Diego Dubcovsky
2015 (30th)	Nothing in Return	A cambio de nada	Daniel Guzmán	César Rodríguez, Iñigo Pérez, Javier Pérez, Joaquín Zamora, Daniel Guzmán, Álvaro Begines, Axel Kuschevatzky, Gabriel Arias-Salgado, Ignacio Fernández-Vega, Miriam Ruiz
2015 (30th)	The Bride	La novia	Paula Ortiz	Rosana Tomas, Álex Lafuente
2015 (30th)	Nobody Wants the Night	Nadie quiere la noche	Isabel Coixet	Andrés Santana, Antonia Nava, Jaume Roures, Javier Méndez
2015 (30th)	A Perfect Day	Un día perfecto	Fernando León de Aranoa	Fernando León de Aranoa, Patricia de Muns, Jaume Roures, Javier Méndez
2016 (31st)	The Fury of a Patient Man	Tarde para la ira	Raúl Arévalo	Agosto, La Película, La Canica Films
2016 (31st)	Smoke & Mirrors	El hombre de las mil caras	Alberto Rodríguez	Atresmedia Cine, El espía de las mil caras, DTS Distribuidora de televisión digital, Atípica Films, Sacromonte Films, Zeta Audiovisual
2016 (31st)	Julieta		Pedro Almodóvar	El Deseo
2016 (31st)	May God Save Us	Que Dios nos perdone	Rodrigo Sorogoyen	Mistery Producciones, Atresmedia Cine, Hernández y Fernández Producciones Cinematográficas, Tornasol Films
2016 (31st)	A Monster Calls	Un monstruo viene a verme	J. A. Bayona	A Monster Calls, Telecinco Cinema, Apaches Entertainment, Películas La Trini
2017 (32nd)	The Bookshop	La librería	Isabel Coixet	Green Films, Zephyr Films, A Contracorriente Films, Diagonal Televisió
2017 (32nd)	Giant	Handia	Aitor Arregi, Jon Garaño	Aundiya Film, Irusoin, Kowalski Films, Moriarti Produkzioak
2017 (32nd)	The Motive	El autor	Manuel Martín Cuenca	La Loma Blanca, Lazona Producciones, Icónica Producciones, Alebrije Cine y Vídeo, Lazona Films
2017 (32nd)	Summer 1993	Estiu 1993	Carla Simón	Inicia Films, Avalon Productora Cinematográfica
2017 (32nd)	Veronica	Verónica	Paco Plaza	Expediente La Película, Apache Films
2018 (33rd)	Champions	Campeones	Javier Fesser	Rey de Babia, Morena Films, Películas Pendelton, Telefónica Studios
2018 (33rd)	Carmen & Lola	Carmen y Lola	Arantxa Echevarría	Tvtec Servicios Audiovisuales
2018 (33rd)	The Realm	El reino	Rodrigo Sorogoyen	Trianera Producciones Cinematográficas, Atresmedia Cine, Bowfinger International Pictures, Tornasol Films
2018 (33rd)	Between Two Waters	Entre dos aguas	Isaki Lacuesta	La Termita Films
2018 (33rd)	Everybody Knows	Todos lo saben	Asghar Farhadi	Memento Films, Lucky Red, Morena Films
2019 (34th)	Pain and Glory	Dolor y gloria	Pedro Almodóvar	El Deseo
2019 (34th)	Out in the Open	Intemperie	Benito Zambrano	Morena Films
2019 (34th)	The Endless Trench	La trinchera infinita	Aitor Arregi, Jon Garaño, José Mari Goenaga	La Trinchera Film, Manny Films, Irusoin, La Claqueta, Moriarti Produkzioak
2019 (34th)	Fire Will Come	O que arde	Oliver Laxe	4 A 4 Productions, Kowalski Films, Miramemira, Tarantula Luxembourg
2019 (34th)	While at War	Mientras dure la guerra	Alejandro Amenábar	Telefónica Audiovisual Digital, Mientras dure la guerra, K&S Films, Himenóptero, Mod Producciones

=== 2020s ===
Year	English title	Original title	Director(s)	Producer(s)
2020 (35th)	Schoolgirls	Las niñas	Pilar Palomero	Las Niñas Majicas, Inicia Films, Bteam Prods
2020 (35th)	Adú		Salvador Calvo	Un Mundo Prohibido, Telecinco Cinema, Ikiru Films, La Terraza Films
2020 (35th)	Ane Is Missing	Ane	David Pérez Sañudo	Amania Films
2020 (35th)	Rosa's Wedding	La boda de Rosa	Icíar Bollaín	La Boda de Rosa La Película, Turanga Films, Setembro Cine, Tandem Films
2020 (35th)	The People Upstairs	Sentimental	Cesc Gay	Sentimentalfilm, Imposible Films
2021 (36th)	The Good Boss	El buen patrón	Fernando León de Aranoa	Fernando León de Aranoa, Jaume Roures, Javier Méndez
2021 (36th)	Maixabel		Icíar Bollaín	Guillermo Sempere, Juan Moreno, Koldo Zuazua
2021 (36th)	Libertad		Clara Roquet	María Zamora Morcillo, Sergi Moreno, Stefan Schmitz, Tono Folguera
2021 (36th)	Parallel Mothers	Madres paralelas	Pedro Almodóvar	Agustín Almodóvar, Esther García
2021 (36th)	Mediterraneo: The Law of the Sea	Mediterráneo	Marcel Barrena	Adrià Monés, Ibon Cormenzana, Ignasi Estapé, Sandra Tapia, Sergi Moreno, Tono Folguera
2022 (37th)	The Beasts	As bestas	Rodrigo Sorogoyen	Anne-Laure Labadie, Eduardo Villanueva, Ibon Cormenzana, Ignasi Estapé, Jean Labadie, Nacho Lavilla, Rodrigo Sorogoyen, Sandra Tapia, Thomas Pibarot
2022 (37th)	Alcarràs		Carla Simón	María Zamora Morcillo, Sergi Moreno, Stefan Schmitz, Tono Folguera
2022 (37th)	Lullaby	Cinco lobitos	Alauda Ruiz de Azúa	Manu Calvo, Marisa Fernández Armenteros, Nahikari Ipiña
2022 (37th)	Motherhood	La maternal	Pilar Palomero	Alex Lafuente, Valérie Delpierre
2022 (37th)	Prison 77	Modelo 77	Alberto Rodríguez	Alberto Félez, Domingo Corral, Gervasio Iglesias, José Antonio Félez
2023 (38th)	Society of the Snow	La sociedad de la nieve	J. A. Bayona	Belén Atienza, J. A. Bayona, Sandra Hermida Muñiz
2023 (38th)	20,000 Species of Bees	20.000 especies de abejas	Estibaliz Urresola Solaguren	Lara Izagirre Garizurieta, Valérie Delpierre
2023 (38th)	Close Your Eyes	Cerrar los ojos	Víctor Erice	Agustín Bossi, Cristina Zumárraga, José Alba, Maximiliano Lasansky, Odile Antonio-Baez, Pablo E. Bossi, Pol Bossi, Víctor Erice
2023 (38th)	Un amor		Isabel Coixet	Marisa Fernández Armenteros, Sandra Hermida Muñiz
2023 (38th)	Jokes & Cigarettes	Saben aquell	David Trueba	Edmon Roch, Jaime Ortiz de Artiñano
2024 (39th)	The 47	El 47	Marcel Barrena	Javier Méndez, Laura Fernández Espeso
2024 (39th)	Undercover	La infiltrada	Arantxa Echevarría	Álvaro Ariza, María Luisa Gutiérrez, Mercedes Gamero, Pablo Nogueroles
2024 (39th)	The Blue Star	La estrella azul	Javier Macipe	Amelia Hernández, Hernán Musaluppi, Simón de Santiago
2024 (39th)	A House on Fire	Casa en flames	Dani de la Orden	Alberto Aranda, Ana Eiras, Ariens Damsi, Bernat Saumell, Dani de la Orden, Jaime Ortiz de Artiñano, Kike Maíllo, Toni Carrizosa
2024 (39th)	Saturn Return	Segundo premio	Isaki Lacuesta, Pol Rodríguez	Cristóbal García
2025 (40th)	Sundays	Los domingos	Alauda Ruiz de Azúa	Manu Calvo, Marisa Fernández Armenteros, Nahikari Ipiña, Sandra Hermida
2025 (40th)	The Dinner	La cena	Manuel Gómez Pereira	Cristóbal García, Lina Badenes, Roberto Butragueño
2025 (40th)	Maspalomas		Jose Mari Goenaga, Aitor Arregi	Ander Barinaga-Rementeria, Ander Sagardoy Múgica, Fernando Larrondo, Xabier Berzosa
2025 (40th)	Sirāt		Oliver Laxe	Agustín Almodóvar, Esther García, Oriol Maymó, Xavi Font
2025 (40th)	Deaf	Sorda	Eva Libertad	Adolfo Blanco, Miriam Porté, Nuria Muñoz Ortín
