= 11th Goya Awards =

- Date: 25 January 1997
- Site: Palacio Municipal de Congresos de Madrid
- Hosted by: Carmen Maura and Juanjo Puigcorbé

Highlights
- Best Film: Thesis
- Best Actor: Santiago Ramos; Como un relámpago
- Best Actress: Emma Suárez; The Dog in the Manger
- Most awards: Thesis and The Dog in the Manger (7)
- Most nominations: The Dog in the Manger (12)

Television coverage
- Network: TVE

The 11th Goya Awards were presented in Palacio Municipal de Congresos de Madrid on 25 January 1997.

Thesis won the award for Best Film.

== Winners and nominees ==
=== Major award nominees ===
Best Film: Thesis; Bwana; The Dog in the Manger	Best Director: Pilar Miró – The Dog in the Manger; Julio Medem – Earth; Imanol Uribe – Bwana
Best Actor: Santiago Ramos – Como un relámpago; Antonio Banderas – Two Much; Carmelo Gómez – The Dog in the Manger	Best Actress: Emma Suárez – The Dog in the Manger; Ana Torrent – Thesis; Concha Velasco – Beyond the Garden
Best Supporting Actor: Luis Cuenca – The Good Life; Jordi Mollà – La Celestina; Nancho Novo – La Celestina	Best Supporting Actress: Mary Carrillo – Beyond the Garden; Loles León – Libertarias; Maribel Verdú – La Celestina
Best Original Screenplay: Thesis – Alejandro Amenábar; The Good Life – David Trueba; Things I Never Told You – Isabel Coixet	Best Adapted Screenplay: The Dog in the Manger – Pilar Miró and Rafael Pérez Sierra; Beyond the Garden – Mario Camus; Tramway to Malvarrosa – Rafael Azcona and José Luis García Sánchez
Best New Actor: Fele Martínez – Thesis; Emilio Buale – Bwana; Liberto Rabal – Tramway to Malvarrosa	Best New Actress: Íngrid Rubio – Beyond the Garden; Lucía Jiménez – The Good Life; Silke Hornillos Klein – Earth
Best Spanish Language Foreign Film: Autumn Sun • Argentina; Think of Me • Cuba; No Return Address • Mexico	Best European Film: Secrets & Lies • UK; Breaking the Waves • Denmark; The Gaze of Odysseus • Greece
Best New Director: Alejandro Amenábar – Thesis; David Trueba – The Good Life; Alfonso Albacete, Miguel Bardem and David Menkes – Not Love, Just Frenzy	Best Original Score: Earth – Alberto Iglesias; The Dog in the Manger – José Nieto; Robert Rylands' Last Journey – Ángel Illarramendi

=== Other award nominees ===
Best Cinematography: The Dog in the Manger – Javier Aguirresarobe; La Celestina – José Luis López-Linares; Tramway to Malvarrosa – José Luis Alcaine	Best Editing: Thesis – María Elena Sáinz de Rozas; The Dog in the Manger – Pablo González del Amo; Storm the Skies – Pablo Blanco and Fidel Collados
Best Art Direction: The Dog in the Manger – Félix Murcia; La Celestina – Ana Alvargonzález; Tramway to Malvarrosa – Pierre-Louis Thévenet	Best Production Supervision: Thesis – Emiliano Otegui; Libertarias – Luis Gutiérrez; Beyond the Garden – Carmen Martínez
Best Sound: Thesis – Daniel Goldstein, Ricardo Steinberg and Alfonso Pino; The Dog in the Manger – Carlos Faruolo, Ray Gillon and Antonio Bloch; Libertarias – Carlos Faruolo, Ray Gillon and Ricard Casals	Best Special Effects: Earth – Reyes Abades and Ignacio Sanz Pastor; Killer Tongue – Patrick Vinge, Jonathan Stuart and Marcus Wookey; Libertarias – Reyes Abades
Best Costume Design: The Dog in the Manger – Pedro Moreno; La Celestina – Sonia Grande and Gerardo Vera; Libertarias – Javier Artiñano	Best Makeup and Hairstyles: The Dog in the Manger – Juan Pedro Hernández, Esther Martín and Mercedes Paradela; La Celestina – Paca Almenara and Alicia López Medina; Libertarias – Juan Pedro Hernández, Ana Lozano, Esther Martín and Manuel García
Best Fictional Short Film: La viga; David; El tren de las ocho; Esposados; La gotera	Best Animated Short Film: Pregunta por mí; Esclavos de mi poder; Mater Gloriosa
Best Documentary Short Film: Virgen de la Alegría

== Honorary Goya ==
- Miguel Picazo
