= Goya Awards =

Annual award by the Spanish Film Academy

- Current: 40th Goya Awards
- Ceremony's logo
- Awarded for: Excellence in the Spanish film industry
- Country: Spain
- Presented by: Academy of Cinematographic Arts and Sciences of Spain (AACCE)
- First award: 1986
- Website: Official website

The Goya Awards (Spanish: Premios Goya) are awards for artistic and technical merit in Spanish cinema. They are presented annually by the Academy of Cinematographic Arts and Sciences of Spain (AACCE) in recognition of excellence in cinematic achievements, as assessed by the Academy's voting membership. In addition to recognizing Spanish films each year, and the professionals who made them, the Academy also awards the competitive Best European Film and Best Ibero-American Film awards, and the non-competitive Honorary and International Goya awards.

The first Goya Awards ceremony was held in 1987, a year after the founding of the Academy, at the Teatro Lope de Vega in Madrid. They have since been also held in Barcelona, Seville, Málaga, Valencia, Valladolid, and Granada. With the exception of the 5th edition, they have been televised on the public broadcaster Televisión Española (TVE).

The awards statuette is a small bronze bust of Francisco Goya created by the sculptor José Luis Fernández.

== History ==
To reward the best Spanish films of each year, the Academy of Cinematographic Arts and Sciences of Spain decided to create the Goya Awards, named after 18th–19th century painter Francisco Goya. The inaugural ceremony took place on 17 March 1987, at the Lope de Vega theatre in Madrid. From the 2nd edition until the 9th edition, the awards were held at the Palacio de Congresos in the Paseo de la Castellana. Then they moved to the Palacio Municipal de Congresos, also in Madrid. In 2000, the ceremony took place at L'Auditori in Barcelona. The 2019 and 2023 ceremonies took place in Seville, the 2020 and 2021 ceremonies in Málaga, the 2022 ceremony in Valencia, the 2024 ceremony in Valladolid, the 2025 ceremony in Granada, and the 2026 ceremony in Barcelona.

In 2003, a large number of film professionals took advantage of the Goya awards ceremony to express their opposition to the Aznar's government support of the U.S. invasion of Iraq. In 2004, the AVT (an association against terrorism in Spain) demonstrated against terrorism and ETA, a paramilitary organization of Basque separatists, in front of the Lope de Vega theatre. In 2005, José Luis Rodríguez Zapatero was the first prime minister in the history of Spain to attend the event. In 2013, the minister of culture and education José Ignacio Wert did not attend, saying he had “other things to do”. Some actors said that this decision reflected the government's lack of respect for their profession and industry.

== Trophy sculpture ==
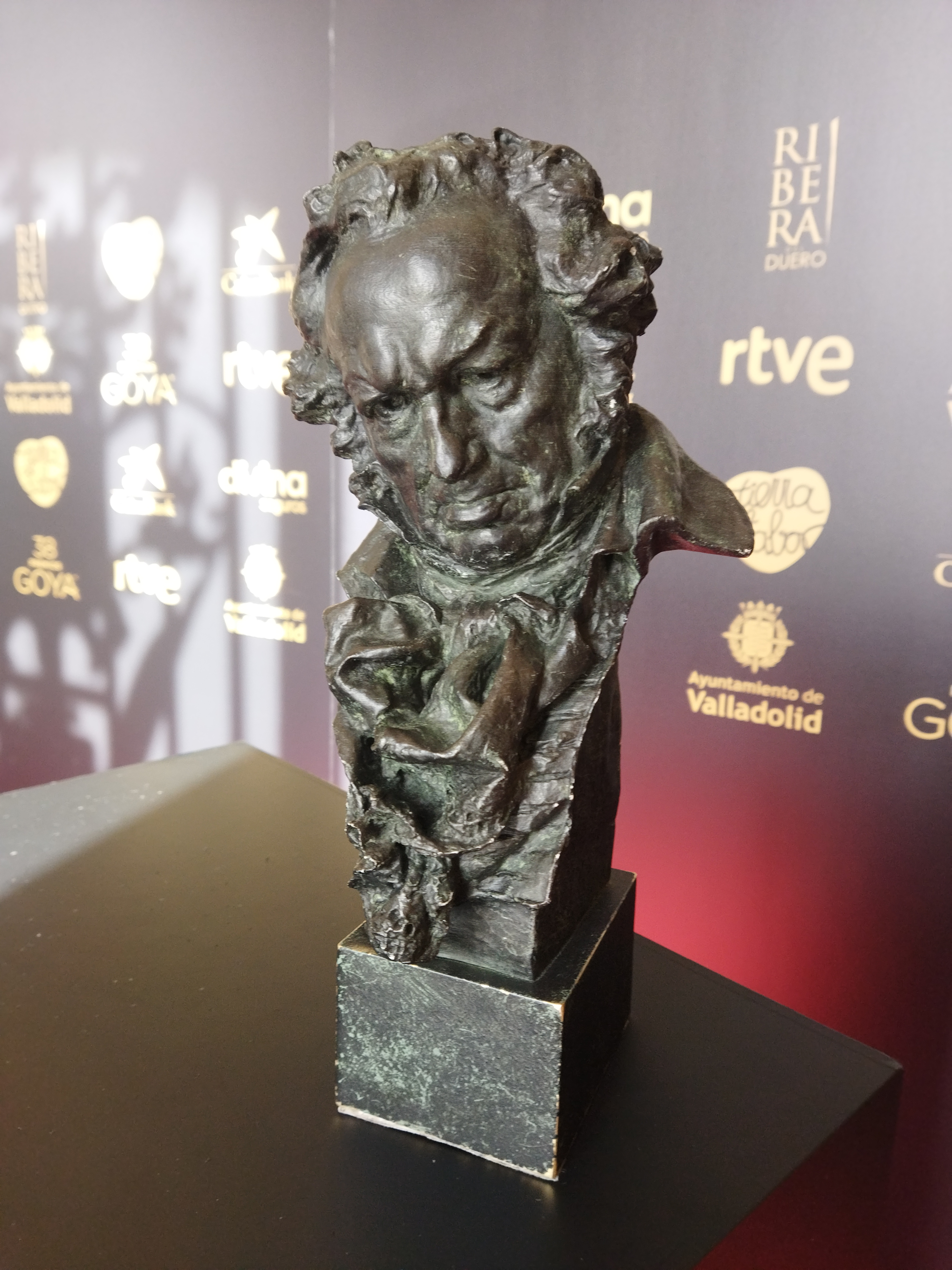
Replica of the Goya Award at the Valladolid City Hall.

The award itself is a small bronze bust of Francisco Goya created by the sculptor José Luis Fernández, although the original sculpture for the first edition of the Goyas was by Miguel Ortiz Berrocal. The trophy sculpture is informally known as cabezón (plural: cabezones), 'bighead'.

== Awards ==
The awards are currently delivered in 28 competitive categories, with five nominees per category since the 37th edition. Previously, there had been three candidates in the first edition, five in the second and third edition, three from the fourth to the twelfth edition, and four from the thirteenth to the 36th editions. In addition, there are two non-competitive categories: the Honorary Goya Award and the International Goya Award.

- Best Film
- Best Director
- Best Leading Actor
- Best Leading Actress
- Best Original Screenplay
- Best Adapted Screenplay
- Best New Director
- Best Supporting Actor
- Best Supporting Actress
- Best New Actor
- Best New Actress
- Best Production Supervision
- Best Cinematography
- Best Editing
- Best Original Score
- Best Original Song
- Best Art Direction
- Best Costume Design
- Best Makeup and Hairstyles
- Best Sound
- Best Special Effects
- Best Animated Film
- Best Animated Short Film
- Best Documentary Short Film
- Best Fictional Short Film
- Best European Film
- Best Documentary
- Best Ibero-American Film
- Honorary Goya Award
- International Goya Award

== Award ceremonies ==
The following is a listing of all Goya Awards ceremonies since 1986.

Ceremony	Date	Best Picture winner	Host(s)	Venue
1st	17 March 1987	Voyage to Nowhere	Fernando Rey	Teatro Lope de Vega, Madrid
2nd	22 March 1988	El bosque animado	Fernando Rey	Palacio de Congresos de Madrid, Madrid
3rd	21 March 1989	Women on the Verge of a Nervous Breakdown	Verónica Forqué, Antonio Resines	Palacio de Congresos de Madrid, Madrid
4th	10 March 1990	Twisted Obsession	Carmen Maura, Andrés Pajares	Palacio de Congresos de Madrid, Madrid
5th	16 February 1991	¡Ay Carmela!	Lydia Bosch, Jorge Sanz	Palacio de Congresos de Madrid, Madrid
6th	7 March 1992	Lovers	Aitana Sánchez-Gijón, José Coronado	Palacio de Congresos de Madrid, Madrid
7th	13 March 1993	Belle Époque	Imanol Arias	Palacio de Congresos de Madrid, Madrid
8th	21 January 1994	Todos a la cárcel	Rosa María Sardà	Palacio de Congresos de Madrid, Madrid
9th	21 January 1995	Running Out of Time	Imanol Arias	Palacio de Congresos de Madrid, Madrid
10th	25 January 1996	Nobody Will Speak of Us When We're Dead	Verónica Forqué, Javier Gurruchaga	Palacio Municipal de Congresos de Madrid, Madrid
11th	25 January 1997	Thesis	Carmen Maura, Juanjo Puigcorbé	Palacio Municipal de Congresos de Madrid, Madrid
12th	31 January 1998	Lucky Star	El Gran Wyoming	Palacio Municipal de Congresos de Madrid, Madrid
13th	23 January 1999	The Girl of Your Dreams	Rosa María Sardà	Palacio Municipal de Congresos de Madrid, Madrid
14th	29 January 2000	All About My Mother	Antonia San Juan	L'Auditori, Barcelona
15th	3 February 2001	El Bola	María Barranco, José Coronado, Loles León, Imanol Arias, Concha Velasco, Pablo Carbonell	Palacio Municipal de Congresos de Madrid, Madrid
16th	2 February 2002	The Others	Rosa María Sardà	Palacio Municipal de Congresos de Madrid, Madrid
17th	1 February 2003	Mondays in the Sun	Alberto San Juan, Guillermo Toledo	Palacio Municipal de Congresos de Madrid, Madrid
18th	31 January 2004	Take My Eyes	Cayetana Guillén Cuervo, Diego Luna	Palacio Municipal de Congresos de Madrid, Madrid
19th	30 January 2005	The Sea Inside	Antonio Resines, Maribel Verdú, Montserrat Caballé	Palacio Municipal de Congresos de Madrid, Madrid
20th	29 January 2006	The Secret Life of Words	Concha Velasco, Antonio Resines	Palacio Municipal de Congresos de Madrid, Madrid
21st	28 January 2007	Volver	José Corbacho	Palacio Municipal de Congresos de Madrid, Madrid
22nd	3 February 2008	Solitary Fragments	José Corbacho	Palacio Municipal de Congresos de Madrid, Madrid
23rd	1 February 2009	Camino	Carmen Machi, Muchachada Nui	Palacio Municipal de Congresos de Madrid, Madrid
24th	14 February 2010	Cell 211	Andreu Buenafuente	Palacio Municipal de Congresos de Madrid, Madrid
25th	13 February 2011	Black Bread	Andreu Buenafuente	Teatro Real, Madrid
26th	19 February 2012	No Rest for the Wicked	Eva Hache	Palacio Municipal de Congresos de Madrid, Madrid
27th	17 February 2013	Blancanieves	Eva Hache	Madrid Marriott Auditorium Hotel, Madrid
28th	9 February 2014	Living Is Easy with Eyes Closed	Manel Fuentes	Madrid Marriott Auditorium Hotel, Madrid
29th	7 February 2015	Marshland	Dani Rovira	Madrid Marriott Auditorium Hotel, Madrid
30th	6 February 2016	Truman	Dani Rovira	Madrid Marriott Auditorium Hotel, Madrid
31st	4 February 2017	The Fury of a Patient Man	Dani Rovira	Madrid Marriott Auditorium Hotel, Madrid
32nd	3 February 2018	The Bookshop	Joaquín Reyes, Ernesto Sevilla	Madrid Marriott Auditorium Hotel, Madrid
33rd	2 February 2019	Champions	Silvia Abril, Andreu Buenafuente	Palacio de Congresos y Exposiciones FIBES Sevilla, Seville
34th	25 January 2020	Pain and Glory	Silvia Abril, Andreu Buenafuente	Palacio de Deportes José María Martín Carpena, Málaga
35th	6 March 2021	Schoolgirls	Antonio Banderas, María Casado	Teatro del Soho CaixaBank, Málaga
36th	12 February 2022	The Good Boss	No host (collective)	Palau de les Arts Reina Sofía, Valencia
37th	11 February 2023	The Beasts	Antonio de la Torre, Clara Lago	Palacio de Congresos y Exposiciones FIBES Sevilla, Seville
38th	10 February 2024	Society of the Snow	Ana Belén, Javier Ambrossi, Javier Calvo	Feria de Valladolid, Valladolid
39th	8 February 2025	The 47 Undercover	Maribel Verdú, Leonor Watling	Palacio de Exposiciones y Congresos de Granada, Granada
40th	28 February 2026	Sundays	Rigoberta Bandini, Luis Tosar	Auditori Fòrum, Barcelona
41st	6 February 2027	TBD	TBD	Navarra Arena, Pamplona

== Trivia ==
=== "Big Five" winners and nominees ===
==== Winners ====
The following is a list of films that won the awards for Best Film, Director, Actor, Actress and Screenplay (original or adapted).

- ¡Ay, Carmela! (1990): Director (Carlos Saura), adapted screenplay (Rafael Azcona and Carlos Saura), Actor (Andrés Pajares) and Actress (Carmen Maura).
- Take My Eyes (2003): Director (Icíar Bollaín), original screenplay (Icíar Bollaín), Actor (Luis Tosar) and Actress (Laia Marull).
- The Sea Inside (2004): Director (Alejandro Amenábar), original screenplay (Alejandro Amenábar and Mateo Gil), Actor (Javier Bardem) and Actress (Lola Dueñas).

==== Nominees ====
Four awards won

- Belle Époque (1992): won Film, Director (Fernando Trueba), original screenplay (Rafael Azcona, José Luis García Sánchez and Fernando Trueba) and Actress (Ariadna Gil); lost Actor (Jorge Sanz).
- Running Out of Time (1994): won Film, Director (Imanol Uribe), adapted screenplay (Imanol Uribe) and Actor (Carmelo Gómez); lost Actress (Ruth Gabriel).
- Lucky Star (1997): won Film, Director (Ricardo Franco), original screenplay (Ricardo Franco and Ángeles González-Sinde) and Actor (Antonio Resines); lost Actress (Maribel Verdú).
- Pain and Glory (2019): won Film, Director (Pedro Almodóvar), original screenplay (Pedro Almodóvar) and Actor (Antonio Banderas); lost Actress (Penélope Cruz).
- The Beasts (2022): won Film, Director (Rodrigo Sorogoyen), Original Screenplay (Isabel Peña and Rodrigo Sorogoyen), Actor (Denis Ménochet); lost Actress (Marina Foïs).
- Sundays (2025): won Film, Director (Alauda Ruiz de Azúa), original screenplay (Alauda Ruiz de Azúa), Actress (Patricia López Arnaiz); lost Actor (Miguel Garcés).

Three awards won

- Blancanieves (2012): won Film, Actress (Maribel Verdú) and original screenplay (Pablo Berger); lost Director (Pablo Berger) and Actor (Daniel Giménez Cacho).

Two awards won

- Lovers (1991): won Film and Director (Vicente Aranda); lost original screenplay (Álvaro del Amo, Carlos Pérez Merinero and Vicente Aranda), Actor (Jorge Sanz), Actress (Victoria Abril and Maribel Verdú).
- The Girl of Your Dreams (1998): won Film and Actress (Penélope Cruz); lost Director (Fernando Trueba), original screenplay (Rafael Azcona, David Trueba, Carlos López and Miguel Ángel Egea) and Actor (Antonio Resines).

One award won

- Pan's Labyrinth (2006): won original screenplay (Guillermo del Toro); lost Film, Director (Guillermo del Toro), Actor (Sergi López) and Actress (Maribel Verdú).
- The Skin I Live In (2011): won Actress (Elena Anaya); lost Film, Director (Pedro Almodóvar), original screenplay (Pedro Almodóvar) and Actor (Antonio Banderas).
- Magical Girl (2014): won Actress (Bárbara Lennie); lost Film, Director (Carlos Vermut), original screenplay (Carlos Vermut) and Actor (Luis Bermejo)
- The Endless Trench (2019): won Actress (Belén Cuesta); lost Film, Director (Aitor Arregi, Jon Garaño and José Mari Goenaga), original screenplay (José Mari Goenaga and Luiso Berdejo) and Actor (Antonio de la Torre)

No award won

- Tie Me Up! Tie Me Down! (1990): lost Film, Director (Pedro Almodóvar), original screenplay (Pedro Almodóvar), Actor (Antonio Banderas) and Actress (Victoria Abril).
- The Artist and the Model (2012): lost Film, Director (Fernando Trueba), original screenplay (Fernando Trueba and Jean-Claude Carrière), Actor (Jean Rochefort) and Actress (Aida Folch).
- The Bride (2015): lost Film, Director (Paula Ortiz), adapted screenplay (Javier García and Paula Ortiz), Actor (Asier Etxeandia) and Actress (Inma Cuesta)

== Multiple wins ==
The following is a list of films with six or more awards.

14 wins

- The Sea Inside (2004)

13 wins

- ¡Ay, Carmela! (1990)

12 wins

- Society of the Snow (2023)

10 wins

- Blancanieves (2012)
- Marshland (2014)
- Giant (2017)

9 wins

- Belle Époque (1992)
- Black Bread (2010)
- A Monster Calls (2016)
- The Beasts (2022)

8 wins

- The Dumbfounded King (1991)
- Running Out of Time (1994)
- Nobody Will Speak of Us When We're Dead (1995)
- The Others (2001)
- Cell 211 (2009)
- Witching and Bitching (2013)

7 wins

- Tesis (1996)
- The Dog in the Manger (1996)
- The Girl of Your Dreams (1998)
- All About My Mother (1999)
- Take My Eyes (2003)
- Pan's Labyrinth (2006)
- The Orphanage (2007)
- Agora (2009)
- The Realm (2018)
- Pain and Glory (2019)

6 wins

- Rowing with the Wind (1988)
- Twisted Obsession (1989)
- Banderas, the Tyrant (1993)
- The Day of the Beast (1995)
- Camino (2008)
- No Rest for the Wicked (2011)
- Living Is Easy with Eyes Closed (2013)
- The Good Boss (2021)
- Sirāt (2025)

== Multiple nominations ==
The following is a list of films with ten or more nominations.

20 nominations

- The Good Boss (2021)

19 nominations

- Running Out of Time (1994)

18 nominations

- The Girl of Your Dreams (1998)
- Blancanieves (2012)

17 nominations

- Belle Époque (1992)
- Marshland (2014)
- While at War (2019)
- The Beasts (2022)

16 nominations

- Women on the Verge of a Nervous Breakdown (1988)
- Cell 211 (2009)
- The Skin I Live In (2011)
- Unit 7 (2012)
- El Niño (2014)
- Pain and Glory (2019)
- Prison 77 (2022)

15 nominations

- ¡Ay, Carmela! (1990)
- Tie Me Up! Tie Me Down! (1990)
- La comunidad (2000)
- The Others (2001)
- The Sea Inside (2004)
- Alatriste (2006)
- The Blind Sunflowers (2008)
- The Last Circus (2010)
- The Endless Trench (2019)
- 20,000 Species of Bees (2023)

14 nominations

- The Dumbfounded King (1991)
- The Day of the Beast (1995)
- All About My Mother (1999)
- You're the One (2000)
- Volver (2006)
- The Orphanage (2007)
- 13 Roses (2007)
- Black Bread (2010)
- No Rest for the Wicked (2011)
- The Impossible (2012)
- Maixabel (2021)
- The 47 (2024)

13 nominations

- Rowing with the Wind (1988)
- The Grandfather (1998)
- Butterfly's Tongue (1999)
- Pan's Labyrinth (2006)
- Agora (2009)
- Even the Rain (2010)
- The Artist and the Model (2012)
- Giant (2017)
- The Realm (2018)
- Adú (2020)
- Society of the Snow (2023)
- Undercover (2024)
- Sundays (2025)

12 nominations

- The Turkish Passion (1994)
- The Dog in the Manger (1996)
- Juana the Mad (2001)
- Eva (2011)
- The Bride (2015)
- A Monster Calls (2016)
- The Bookshop (2017)

11 nominations

- Esquilache (1989)
- The Fencing Master (1992)
- Canción de cuna (1994)
- Solas (1999)
- Sex and Lucía (2001)
- Don't Tempt Me (2001)
- Salvador (2006)
- Just Walking (2008)
- Blackthorn (2011)
- La gran familia española (2013)
- Smoke & Mirrors (2016)
- The Fury of a Patient Man (2016)
- Champions (2018)
- Alcarràs (2022)
- Lullaby (2022)
- Close Your Eyes (2023)
- Jokes & Cigarettes (2023)
- Saturn Return (2024)
- Sirāt (2025)

10 nominations

- Moon Child (1989)
- The Sea and the Weather (1989)
- Nobody Will Speak of Us When We're Dead (1995)
- Open Your Eyes (1997)
- Goya in Bordeaux (1999)
- Obaba (2005)
- Seven Billiard Tables (2007)
- Buried (2010)
- Witching and Bitching (2013)
- The Room Next Door (2024)

== See also ==
- List of film awards
