= By My Side Again =

- Theatrical release poster
- Spanish: Cuando vuelvas a mi lado
- Directed by: Gracia Querejeta
- Screenplay by: Gracia Querejeta; Elías Querejeta; Manuel Gutiérrez Aragón
- Produced by: Elías Querejeta
- Starring: Mercedes Sampietro; Julieta Serrano; Adriana Ozores; Marta Belaustegui; Rosa Mariscal; Jorge Perugorría
- Cinematography: Alfredo Mayo
- Edited by: Nacho Ruiz Capillas
- Music by: Ángel Illarramendi
- Production companies: Sogetel; Elías Querejeta PC; Albares Productions; Blue Cinematografica
- Distributed by: Warner Sogefilms (es)
- Release dates: September 1999 (Zinemaldia); 9 October 1999 (Spain)
- Countries: Spain; France; Italy
- Language: Spanish

By My Side Again (Spanish: Cuando vuelvas a mi lado, lit. 'When you return to my side') is a 1999 film directed by Gracia Querejeta, who also co-wrote the screenplay. It was nominated for seven Goya Awards.

== Cast ==
- Mercedes Sampietro as Gloria
- Jorge Perugorría as Joao
- Julieta Serrano as Tía Rafaela
- Marta Belaustegui as Adela
- Adriana Ozores as Ana
- Rosa Mariscal as Lidia
- Ramón Barea as Donato
- François Dunoyer as Santos

== Production ==
By My Side Again is a Spanish-Italian-French co-production by Sogetel, Elías Querejeta PC, Albares Productions, and Blue Cinematografica, with the participation of Esicma, Continental, TVE, Canal+, Tele Plus, and TVG.

== Release ==
It screened at the 47th San Sebastián International Film Festival in September 1999. Distributed by Warner Sogefilms, it was theatrically released in Spain on 8 October 1999.

== Accolades ==
Year	Award	Category	Nominee(s)	Result	Ref.
1999	47th San Sebastián International Film Festival	Best Cinematography	Alfredo Mayo	Won	
2000	14th Goya Awards	Best Film		Nominated	
2000	14th Goya Awards	Best Director	Gracia Querejeta	Nominated	
2000	14th Goya Awards	Best Original Screenplay	Gracia Querejeta, Elías Querejeta, Manuel Gutiérrez Aragón	Nominated	
2000	14th Goya Awards	Best Actress	Mercedes Sampietro	Nominated	
2000	14th Goya Awards	Best Supporting Actress	Adriana Ozores	Nominated	
2000	14th Goya Awards	Best Supporting Actress	Julieta Serrano	Nominated	
2000	14th Goya Awards	Best Original Score	Ángel Illarramendi	Nominated	

== See also ==
- List of Spanish films of 1999
