= Robert Rylands' Last Journey =

- Theatrical release poster
- Spanish: El último viaje de Robert Rylands
- Directed by: Gracia Querejeta
- Screenplay by: Elías Querejeta; Gracia Querejeta
- Based on: Todas las almas by Javier Marías
- Produced by: Elías Querejeta
- Starring: Ben Cross; William Franklyn; Gary Piquer; Cathy Underwood
- Cinematography: Antonio Pueche
- Edited by: Nacho Ruiz Capillas
- Music by: Ángel Illarramendi; Polo Aledo
- Production companies: Elías Querejeta PC; Buxton Films
- Distributed by: Alta Films
- Release dates: September 1996 (Zinemaldia); 18 October 1996 (Spain)
- Running time: 102 minutes
- Countries: Spain; United Kingdom
- Language: English

Robert Rylands' Last Journey (Spanish: El último viaje de Robert Rylands) is a 1996 Spanish-British film directed by Gracia Querejeta. It was the director's second feature film. Her script is a loose adaptation of the 1989 Javier Marías novel Todas las almas, which the novelist repudiated. The subsequent controversy ended with a lawsuit, which resulted in an indemnification towards the writer and an order to withdraw his name from the credits of the film.

== Plot ==
Robert Rylands, a seductive archaeologist and university professor aged 60, voluntarily presents himself to testify at the police station. His story to the deputy, which lasts all night, begins with the arrival in Oxford of Juan Noguera, a young teacher who is going to teach a Spanish literature course at the university. Juan stays at the home of his colleague and friend Alfred Cromer, who lives with his sister and her little daughter.

Juan soon perceives that the recent return of Robert Rylands to the city, after an absence of ten years, disturbs the family. He tries to investigate the cause, but both Alfred and Jill refuse to reveal the secret between them. Meanwhile, Alfred falls ill and is diagnosed with terminal cancer. Rylands tries repeatedly to contact Alfred, but he refuses to see him.

Little by little Juan and Jill begin to fall in love. In the end Juan discovers the cause of the resentment against Robert Rylands. Robert and Alfred were lovers, and Jill interposed by going to bed with Robert one day. Jill became pregnant with his daughter, and when Alfred found out, the relationship between the two men broke up, and then Robert embarked on one of his exploration trips with no return date.

Alfred leaves the hospital in a wheelchair, and soon after, Juan collaborates in a plot to meet Robert. After the reproaches of the reunion are reconciled, Robert tells him that he wants them to live together for the time that he has left, but Alfred tells him that if he really loves him, he has to help him die with dignity. Robert finally agrees, and after shooting him with his old gun, he goes to the police station to confess.

== Cast ==
- Ben Cross as Alfred Cromer
- William Franklyn as Robert Rylands
- Gary Piquer as Juan Noguera
- Cathy Underwood as Jill, Alfred's sister
- Perdita Weeks as Sue, Jill's daughter
- Kenneth Colley as Archdale
- Lalita Ahmed as Ahira, Robert's housekeeper
- Karl Collins as Abraham, Juan's student
- Maurice Denham as Hume

== Release ==
The film premiered at the 1996 San Sebastián International Film Festival. Distributed by Alta Films, it was released theatrically in Spain on 18 October 1996.

== Reception ==
Derek Elley of Variety deemed the film to be a "highly ambitious sophomore" effort by Querejeta bristling with "well-crafted dialogue", finding its "closest equivalent in overall feel" in the body of David Hare's dramas such as Wetherby, Paris by Night, or Strapless.

Ángel Fernández-Santos of El País declared the film to be "great cinema", praising how Querejeta pulls it off "with ease, great accuracy, and complete mastery over the interweaving of what she films".

== Awards and nominations ==
- 1996: Winner of the Círculo de Escritores Cinematográficos Medal for Best Picture, Best Director (Gracia Querejeta), Best Cinematography (Antonio Pueche), Best Editing (Nacho Ruiz Capillas)
- 1996: Nominated for the Golden Shell of the San Sebastián Film Festival
- 1996: Nominated for the Goya Award for Best Original Music

== See also ==
- List of Spanish films of 1996
