= Nobody Knows Anybody =

1999 film by Mateo Gil

- Theatrical release poster
- Spanish: Nadie conoce a nadie
- Directed by: Mateo Gil
- Screenplay by: Mateo Gil
- Based on: Nadie conoce a nadie by Juan Bonilla
- Starring: Eduardo Noriega; Jordi Mollá; Natalia Verbeke; Paz Vega
- Cinematography: Javier Salmones
- Edited by: Nacho Ruiz Capillas
- Music by: Alejandro Amenábar
- Production companies: Maestranza Films; Sogecine; DMVB Films
- Distributed by: Warner Sogefilms
- Release date: 26 November 1999 (Spain)
- Running time: 108 minutes
- Countries: Spain; France
- Language: Spanish

Nobody Knows Anybody (Spanish: Nadie conoce a nadie) is a 1999 Spanish-French thriller film directed by Mateo Gil, based on the novel by Juan Bonilla. It stars Eduardo Noriega and Jordi Mollá alongside Natalia Verbeke and Paz Vega.

== Plot ==
Amid the spectacular festivities of Holy Week in Seville, an aspiring novelist struggles with his work and pays his bills by composing crossword puzzles. A cryptic recording left on his answering machine demands that he include a certain word in a future puzzle and he becomes drawn into a spiraling tangle of mystery, danger, and confusion. Soon he is forced into participating in a real-life version of a computer game on the narrow streets of Seville with extremely high stakes for the entire city.

== Cast ==
- Eduardo Noriega as Simón
- Jordi Mollá as Sapo
- Natalia Verbeke as María
- Paz Vega as Ariadna
- Pedro Álvarez-Ossorio as Padre Andrés
- Críspulo Cabezas as Pirata
- José Manuel Seda as Capa
- Jesús Olmedo as Brujo
- Petra Martínez as Encargada Archivo de Indias
- Manuel Morón as Jefe de redacción

== Production ==
The film is a Spanish-French co-production by Maestranza Films, Sogecine, and DMVB Films, with the collaboration of the Andalusia Film Commission, Canal Sur, and Canal+. Shooting locations included Seville, Carmona, and Madrid.

== Release ==
Distributed by Warner Sogefilms, the film was theatrically released in Spain on 26 November 1999.

== Accolades ==
Year	Award	Category	Nominee(s)	Result	Ref.
2000	14th Goya Awards	Best New Director	Mateo Gil	Nominated	
2000	14th Goya Awards	Best Special Effects	Raúl Romanillos, Manuel Horrillo, José Núñez, Emilio Ruiz del Río	Won	

== See also ==
- List of Spanish films of 1999
