= Tramway to Malvarrosa =

- Theatrical release poster
- Spanish: Tranvía a la Malvarrosa
- Directed by: José Luis García Sánchez
- Screenplay by: Rafael Azcona
- Based on: Tranvía a la Malvarrosa by Manuel Vicent
- Produced by: Andrés Vicente Gómez
- Starring: Liberto Rabal; Juan Luis Galiardo; Antonio Resines; Vicente Parra; Fernando Fernán Gómez; Ariadna Gil
- Cinematography: José Luis Alcaine
- Edited by: Pablo G. del Amo
- Music by: Antoine Duhamel
- Production companies: Lola Films; Sogetel
- Distributed by: Columbia Tri-Star Films de España
- Release dates: November 1996 (Mar del Plata); 21 March 1997 (Valencia); 4 April 1997 (Spain)
- Country: Spain
- Language: Spanish

Tramway to Malvarrosa (Spanish: Tranvía a la Malvarrosa) is a 1996 Spanish coming-of-age drama film directed by José Luis García Sánchez and written by Rafael Azcona based on the 1994 novel by Manuel Vicent. It stars Liberto Rabal.

== Plot ==
Starting in 1957, the plot tracks the coming-of-age story and sexual awakening of Manuel, a small-town boy who moves to the provincial capital, Valencia, to study a degree in law.

== Cast ==
- Liberto Rabal as Manuel
- Juan Luis Galiardo as Arsenio
- Antonio Resines as el Semo
- Vicente Parra as padre Cáceres
- Fernando Fernán Gómez as Corts Grau
- Ariadna Gil as la China
- Jorge Merino as el Bola
- Sergio Villanueva as Luis
- Luis Montes as Vidal
- Francisco Ballcells as capitán general Ríos Capapé
- Olivia Navas as Juliette
- Nacho Fresneda

== Production ==
An adaptation of the novel Tranvía a la Malvarrosa by Manuel Vicent, the screenplay was penned by Rafael Azcona. The film was produced by Andrés Vicente Gómez's Lola Films alongside Sogetel, with participation of Canal+, and Sogepaq. In addition to the city of Valencia, shooting took place across locations in the wider Valencia region, including the provinces of Valencia (El Saler, Alzira, Nazaret, Sueca, Guadassuar, L'Alcúdia and Alboraia), Alicante (Pego) and Castellón (Les Alqueries and Xodos).

== Release ==
The film screened at the Mar del Plata International Film Festival in November 1996. It was pre-screened in Valencia on 21 March 1997. Distributed by Columbia Tri-Star Films de España, the film was theatrically released in Spain on 4 April 1997.

== Reception ==
Ken Eisner of Variety deemed the film to be "a wonderfully evocative coming-of-age story".

== Accolades ==
Year	Award	Category	Nominee(s)	Result	Ref.
1997	11th Goya Awards	Best Adapted Screenplay	José Luis García Sánchez, Rafael Azcona	Nominated	
1997	11th Goya Awards	Best Cinematography	José Luis Alcaine	Nominated	
1997	11th Goya Awards	Best New Actor	Liberto Rabal	Nominated	
1997	11th Goya Awards	Best Art Direction	Pierre-Louis Thévenet	Nominated	

== See also ==
- List of Spanish films of 1997
