= Sweetwater (2013 film) =

2013 American Western thriller film by Logan Miller

- Movie poster
- Directed by: Logan Miller
- Written by: Andrew McKenzie; Logan Miller; Noah Miller
- Produced by: Jason Netter; Logan Miller; Noah Miller
- Starring: Ed Harris; January Jones; Jason Isaacs; Eduardo Noriega; Stephen Root; Jason Aldean
- Cinematography: Brad Shield
- Edited by: Robert Dalva
- Music by: Martin Davich
- Production companies: Kickstart Productions; Mythic International Entertainment; Raindance Entertainment
- Release dates: January 24, 2013 (Sundance Film Festival); October 11, 2013 (U.S.)
- Running time: 95 minutes
- Country: United States
- Language: English
- Budget: $7 million

Sweetwater (released as Sweet Vengeance in the UK, Australia and New Zealand) is a 2013 American Western film directed by Logan Miller and co-written with Andrew McKenzie and Noah Miller. The film stars Ed Harris, January Jones, Jason Isaacs, Eduardo Noriega, Stephen Root and Jason Aldean.

== Plot ==
In the late 1800s, a beautiful ex-prostitute (January Jones) is trying to build an honest life with her husband Miguel in the rugged plains of New Mexico. When she catches the eye of a sadistic leader of a religious sect, Prophet Josiah (Jason Isaacs), her life is violently turned upside down. She embarks upon a course of bloody vengeance with the assistance of eccentric Sheriff Cornelius Jackson (Ed Harris) who has his own violent tendencies.

== Cast ==
- Ed Harris as Sheriff Cornelius Jackson
- January Jones as Sarah Ramírez
- Jason Isaacs as Prophet Josiah
- Eduardo Noriega as Miguel Ramirez
- Stephen Root as Hugh
- Jason Aldean as Daniel
- Amy Madigan as Madame Bovary
- Vic Browder as Martin
- Luce Rains as Kingfisher
- Dylan Kenin as Jim
- Keith Meriweather as Jonathan
- Noah Miller as Levi
- J.B. Tuttle as Curly
- Chad Brummett as Sid
- Logan Miller as Jacob
- Kevin Wiggins as Barley

== Reception ==
On the review aggregator website Rotten Tomatoes, 25% of 16 critics' reviews are positive. Metacritic, which uses a weighted average, assigned the film a score of 38 out of 100, based on 7 critics, indicating "generally unfavorable" reviews.
