= Beyond the Garden =

- Spanish: Más allá del jardín
- Directed by: Pedro Olea
- Screenplay by: Mario Camus
- Based on: Más allá del jardín by Antonio Gala
- Produced by: Andrés Vicente Gómez
- Starring: Concha Velasco; Fernando Guillén; Manuel Bandera; Ingrid Rubio; Miguel Hermoso; Andrea Occhipinti; Mari Carrillo; Claudia Gravi; Rosa Novell; Maribel Quiñones "Martirio"; Giancarlo Giannini
- Cinematography: José Luis Alcaine
- Edited by: José Salcedo
- Music by: Nicola Piovani
- Production companies: Sogetel; Lolafilms
- Distributed by: Sogepaq
- Release date: 20 December 1996
- Running time: 1h 30min
- Country: Spain
- Language: Spanish

Beyond the Garden (Spanish: Más allá del jardín) is a 1996 Spanish drama film directed by Pedro Olea from a screenplay by Mario Camus, based on the novel of the same name by Antonio Gala. It stars Concha Velasco.

== Cast ==
- Concha Velasco as Palmira Gadea
- Fernando Guillén as Willy
- Manuel Bandera as Tario
- Andrea Occhipinti as Ugo
- Ingrid Rubio as Helena
- Miguel Hermoso as Álex
- Martirio as Mencía
- Mari Carrillo as Ama
- Claudia Gravi as Doctora Dubois
- Mercedes Alonso as Isa
- Giancarlo Giannini as Bernardo
- Goya Toledo as Teresa
- María Galiana as Ramona
- Germán Cobos as Álvaro
- Carmen de la Maza as Soledad
- Eduardo Noriega as Ignacio
- Rosa Novell

== Production ==
Beyond the Garden is a Sogetel and Lola Films production, and it had the participation of Canal+ and Soqepaq. Talking about this film, Concha Velasco recalled the envy of all her colleagues on the set for having a scene in the car with a naked Manuel Bandera "and on top" of her, also scantily clad. "The seamstresses, the makeup artists, the hairdressers... they all told me how lucky I was and asked me how he had 'that'," she said amused. Locations in Senegal were used to portray a Rwandan refugee settlement.

== Release ==
Distributed by Sogepaq, the film was theatrically released in Spain on 20 December 1996. It opened on 53 screens and grossed $279,216 for the week, placing eighth at the Spanish box office.

== Accolades ==
Year	Award	Category	Nominee(s)	Result	Ref.
1997	11th Goya Awards	Best Adapted Screenplay	Mario Camus	Nominated	
1997	11th Goya Awards	Best Actress	Concha Velasco	Nominated	
1997	11th Goya Awards	Best Supporting Actress	Mary Carrillo	Won	
1997	11th Goya Awards	Best New Actress	Ingrid Rubio	Won	
1997	11th Goya Awards	Best Production Supervision	Carmen Martínez	Nominated	

== See also ==
- List of Spanish films of 1996
