= The Dog in the Manger (1996 film) =

- Theatrical release poster
- Spanish: El perro del hortelano
- Directed by: Pilar Miró
- Screenplay by: Pilar Miró
- Based on: The Dog in the Manger by Lope de Vega
- Starring: Emma Suárez; Carmelo Gómez; Ana Duato; Fernando Conde; Miguel Rellán; Ángel de Andrés; Juan Gea; Maite Blasco
- Cinematography: Javier Aguirresarobe
- Edited by: Pablo G. del Amo
- Music by: José Nieto
- Production companies: Enrique Cerezo PC; Cartel; Lolafilms
- Distributed by: Columbia Tri-Star Films de España
- Release date: 27 November 1996
- Running time: 104 minutes
- Country: Spain
- Language: Spanish

The Dog in the Manger (Spanish: El perro del hortelano) is a 1996 Spanish film written and directed by Pilar Miró and based on the 1618 play of the same name by Lope de Vega.

== Cast ==
- Emma Suárez, Diana, Countess of Belflor
- Carmelo Gómez as Teodoro
- Fernando Conde as Tristán
- Ana Duato as Marcela
- Miguel Rellán as Fabio
- Juan Gea as Federico
- Ángel de Andrés as Ricardo
- Maite Blasco as Anarda
- José Lifante as Octavio
- Cesáreo Estébanez as Leónido
- Blanca Portillo as Dorotea
- Vicente Díez as Celio
- Rafael Alonso as Ludovico
- Vicente Cuesta as Furio
- Diego Carvajal as Camilo

== Production ==
The film was produced by Enrique Cerezo PC, Cartel S.A. and Lolafilms S.A. with the participation of RTVE and Canal+.

It was shot in Portuguese locations such as the Sintra National Palace, the Palace of Queluz, the Palace of the Marquises of Fronteira and the church of Setúbal.

== Release ==
Distributed by Columbia Tri-Star Films de España, the film was theatrically released in Spain on 27 November 1996 on 34 screens and grossed 43 million pesetas in its first week, placing third at the Spanish box office.

== Awards and nominations ==
Year	Award	Category	Nominee(s)	Result	Ref.
1997	11th Goya Awards	Best Film		Nominated	
1997	11th Goya Awards	Best Director	Pilar Miró	Won	
1997	11th Goya Awards	Best Actress	Emma Suárez	Won	
1997	11th Goya Awards	Best Actor	Carmelo Gómez	Nominated	
1997	11th Goya Awards	Best Adapted Screenplay	Pilar Miró, Rafael Pérez Sierra	Won	
1997	11th Goya Awards	Best Editing	Pablo del Amo	Nominated	
1997	11th Goya Awards	Best Original Score	José Nieto	Nominated	
1997	11th Goya Awards	Best Art Direction	Félix Murcia	Won	
1997	11th Goya Awards	Best Costume Design	Pedro Moreno	Won	
1997	11th Goya Awards	Best Cinematography	Javier Aguirresarobe	Won	
1997	11th Goya Awards	Best Makeup and Hairstyles	Esther Martín, Juan Pedro Hernández, Mercedes Paradela	Won	
1997	11th Goya Awards	Best Sound	Antonio Bloch, Carlos Faruolo and Ray Gillon	Nominated	

== See also ==
- List of Spanish films of 1996
