= Blackthorn (film) =

2011 Western film by Mateo Gil

- Theatrical release poster
- Directed by: Mateo Gil
- Written by: Miguel Barros
- Produced by: Ibón Cormenzana; Andrés Santana; Jan Pace; Paolo Agazzi
- Starring: Sam Shepard; Eduardo Noriega; Stephen Rea; Magaly Solier; Cristian Mercado
- Cinematography: Juan Ruiz Anchía
- Edited by: David Gallart
- Music by: Lucio Godoy
- Production companies: Nix Films; Eter Pictures; Manto Films; Noodles Production
- Distributed by: Alta Films (Spain); Artificial Eye (United Kingdom); BAC Films (France)
- Release dates: July 1, 2011 (Spain); October 7, 2011 (US)
- Running time: 98 minutes
- Countries: Spain; Bolivia; United Kingdom; France
- Languages: English; Spanish
- Budget: $4.5 million

Blackthorn is a 2011 Western film directed by Mateo Gil and starring Sam Shepard, Eduardo Noriega, and Stephen Rea. Written by Miguel Barros, the film is a fictional account of an aged Butch Cassidy living under the assumed name James Blackthorn in a secluded village in Bolivia 20 years after his disappearance in 1908. Blackthorn was filmed on location in La Paz, Potosí, and Uyuni in Bolivia. Initially released in Spain on 1 July 2011, the film was released theatrically in the United States on 7 October 2011.

== Plot ==
Twenty years after his disappearance in 1908, an aged Butch Cassidy (Sam Shepard), living under the assumed name James Blackthorn in a secluded village in Bolivia, decides to end his long exile and return to the United States after learning of the death of Etta Place. He writes to their son, Ryan, telling him he intends to return. After years of raising horses and living a solitary life, Blackthorn sets off for Potosí to sell his horses. He tells his lover, Yana (Magaly Solier), that he will see her again before leaving Bolivia.

At Potosí, Blackthorn withdraws his savings from the bank, sells his horses, and then heads back to his village. Along the way, he is ambushed and nearly killed. He shoots his attacker, but not before Blackthorn's horse, Cinco, bolts off with his money. The shooter is Eduardo Apodaca (Eduardo Noriega), a Spaniard mining engineer who claims he was shooting at pursuers. He begs Blackthorn to save him and offers to share part of the $50,000 he stole from powerful Bolivian industrialist and mine owner Simón Patiño. The money is hidden in an abandoned mine, and he will compensate Blackthorn for his help.

Blackthorn and the Spaniard set out across the desert plateau with Patiño's posse within a day's pursuit. They reach the abandoned mine and find the money, but the posse catches up with them. Following a shootout, Blackthorn and the Spaniard escape with the money. They make their way to Blackthorn's cabin, where the famous outlaw remembers his old friendships with the Sundance Kid and Etta Place, and how they escaped from Pinkerton Detective Mackinley (Stephen Rea). Yana joins the men at the cabin, and Blackthorn gives her a pocket watch he won in a card game. At first, she rejects it as a "gringo machine", but then accepts the gift as something to remember him by. Despite his asking her to spend one last night with him, she advises she must return to her own family. Later that night, Yana returns to the cabin to stay with Blackthorn on his last night before leaving.

The next morning, two female members of the posse come to the cabin looking for the Spaniard, and in the ensuing gunfight, Blackthorn is wounded, and Yana is killed. A heartbroken Blackthorn and the Spaniard leave with the rest of the posse not far behind. They set out across the Uyuni salt flats, hoping to reach the coast where Blackthorn can find a boat to take him home. Halfway across, the posse catches up to them, but Blackthorn and the Spaniard split up and are able to kill their pursuers and escape.

When he reaches Tupiza, Blackthorn is treated by a doctor, who notifies former Pinkerton Detective Mackinley—now living a quiet life in Bolivia—of his famous patient. Mackinley confirms the man's identity. For years Mackinley claimed that the two bandits killed at San Vincente were not Butch Cassidy and the Sundance Kid, and now he will finally be proven correct. But after initially notifying the Bolivian army of the discovered outlaw, Mackinley changes his mind, returns Blackthorn's pistol, and helps him escape. When Mackinley later discovers that Blackthorn was riding with the Spaniard, he reveals the truth; the $50,000 the Spaniard stole was not from the powerful mine owner, Patiño, but from his former employees, whose cooperatives recently took control of all Bolivian mines. The Spaniard stole money from poor people—something Butch Cassidy would never have done. A horrified Blackthorn recalls his gun battles against the miner's posse but in a new light. Although disgusted by Blackthorn's involvement with the Spaniard, Detective Mackinley does not betray him.

In flashbacks to those days when he and the Sundance Kid rode together, he recalls how his partner, being wounded and near death, asks for Butch to "do it," and so Butch regretfully and lovingly takes the life of his best friend.

In the present, Blackthorn, distressed, tracks the Spaniard into the Andes, with a Bolivian Army posse not far behind. When Blackthorn catches up with him and confronts him with the truth, the Spaniard does not deny it, saying the money he stole was indeed from the mine owners—just "different owners." Blackthorn shoots the Spaniard in the leg and leaves him and the money for the Bolivian army, who soon arrive and kill the thief. The soldiers continue with Mackinley until they reach a notoriously barren region where the army commander leaves the detective alone and without a horse, as punishment for helping Blackthorn escape.

In the closing scene, Blackthorn, remembering his life and friends in better days, is last seen looking back over his shoulder and presumably escaping across the mountains.

== Cast ==
- Sam Shepard as James Blackthorn / Butch Cassidy
  - Nikolaj Coster-Waldau as Young James Blackthorn / Butch Cassidy
- Eduardo Noriega as Ing. Eduardo Apodaca
- Stephen Rea as MacKinley
- Magaly Solier as Yana
- Pádraic Delaney as Sundance Kid
- Dominique McElligott as Etta Place
- Daniel Aguirre as Ivan
- Luis Bredow as Doctor
- Fernando Gamarra as Bank Director
- Maria Luque as Tavern Keeper
- Cristian Mercado as General of The Bolivian Army

== Reception ==
=== Critical response ===
Blackthorn received positive reviews. Rotten Tomatoes assigned the film an approval rating of 75% based on 75 reviews, with an average rating of 6.3/10. The site's critical consensus reads: "Blackthorn invites comparisons to a classic Western – and survives, thanks largely to a charismatic performance by a well-chosen Sam Shepard". On Metacritic, which assigns a weighted average rating, the film received a score of 61 out of 100, based on 20 critics, indicating "generally favorable reviews".

In his review in Time Out New York, Eric Hynes wrote, "It's Sam Shepard's best work since The Right Stuff. He still exudes intellectual mischief and hard-stare sex appeal."

In her review for the Tribeca Film Festival, Genna Terranova wrote, "Mateo Gil makes a solid English-language debut with this sublimely shot and well-acted tale set in the remarkable landscapes of Bolivia. Sam Shepard gives a riveting performance as the weathered, mysterious, and unsentimental Blackthorn, gracefully revitalizing the legend of history's favorite outlaw."

In her review in The New York Times, Rachel Saltz wrote, "The filmmakers—the director Mateo Gil and the screenwriter Miguel Barros—know what component parts make up a revisionist western, just as they know what goes into making a beautiful shot of the Bolivian hills or salt flats. What they don't know is how to put the pieces together in a way that makes a taut narrative or that sidesteps clichés."

In her review in the Los Angeles Times, Betsy Sharkey wrote, "The dialogue sometimes wavers and the plot doubles back on itself one too many times, and you can't help but wish Gil had asserted himself more on that front. As a director, he is still finding his way too, with the emotional pacing sometimes as rough as the trail his characters are riding. Still, there is that allure of the Old West that is hard to resist, and there's plenty of grist in the story worth milling and mulling. If nothing else, the film reminds just how arresting an actor Shepard can be."

=== Accolades ===
Award	Category	Recipient(s)	Result
Círculo de Escritores Cinematográficos (Spain)	Best Actor	Sam Shepard	Nominated
Goya Awards	Best Production Supervision	Andrés Santana	Won
Goya Awards	Best Costume Design	Clara Bilbao	Won
Goya Awards	Best Cinematography	Juan Antonio Ruiz Anchía	Won
Goya Awards	Best Art Direction	Juan Pedro de Gaspar	Won
Goya Awards	Best Film		Nominated
Goya Awards	Best Director	Mateo Gil	Nominated
Goya Awards	Best Original Screenplay	Miguel Barros	Nominated
Goya Awards	Best Original Score	Lucio Godoy	Nominated
Goya Awards	Best Editing	David Gallart	Nominated
Goya Awards	Best Sound	Daniel Fontrodona, Marc Orts, Fabiola Ordoyo	Nominated
Goya Awards	Best Makeup and Hairstyling	Ana López-Puigcerver, Belén López-Puigcerver	Nominated

== See also ==
- List of Spanish films of 2011
