= Eduardo Noriega (Spanish actor) =

Spanish actor (born 1973)

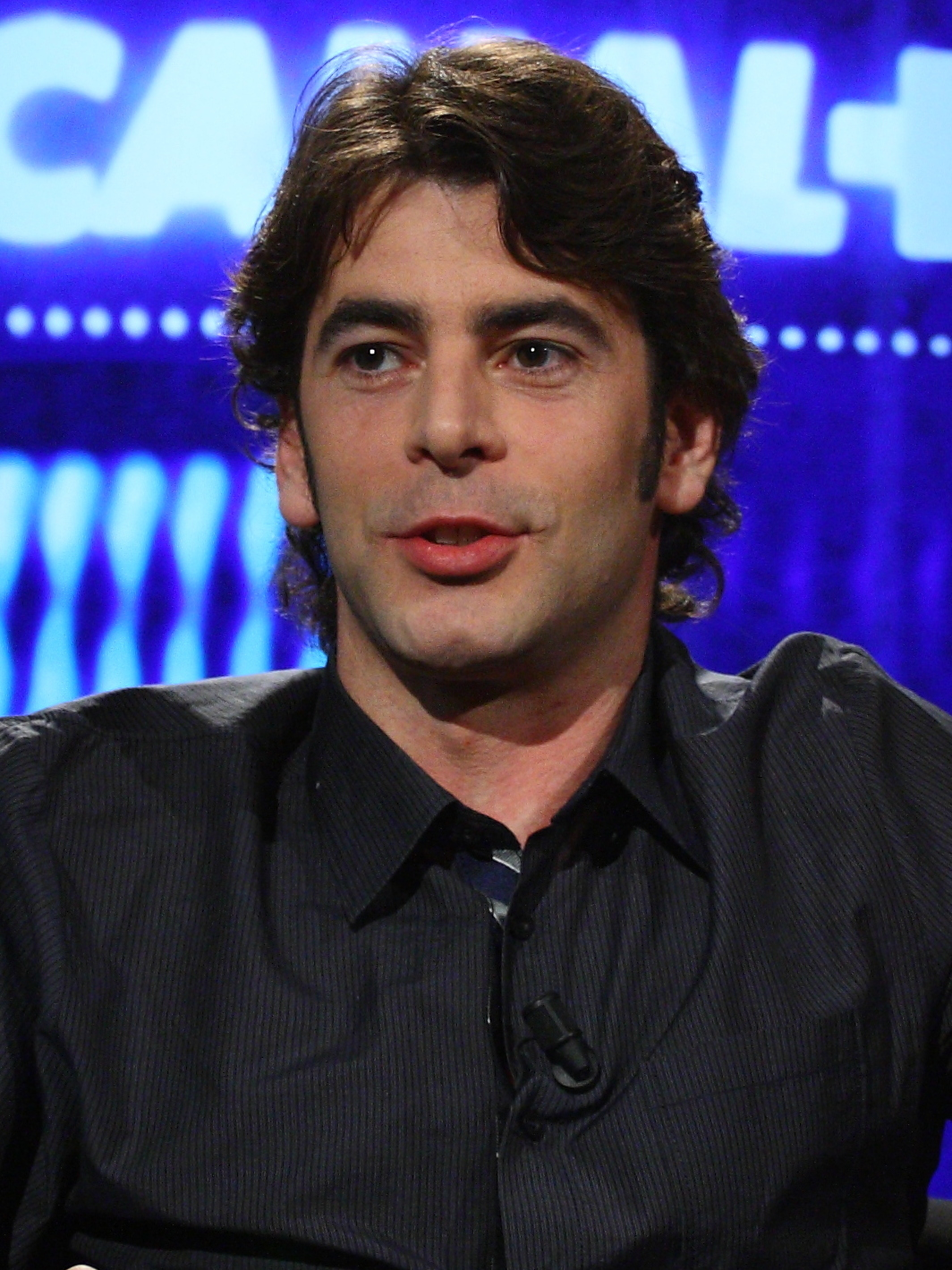
- Noriega in 2008
- Born: Eduardo Noriega Gómez; 1 August 1973 (age 53); Santander, Spain
- Occupation: Actor
- Years active: 1993–present
- Spouse: Trinidad Oteros (m. 2011)

Eduardo Noriega Gómez (pronounced [eˈðwaɾðo noˈɾjeɣa]; born 1 August 1973) is a Spanish actor. He gained notoriety in Spain for his performance in Thesis (1996), which was followed by roles in Open Your Eyes (1997) and The Wolf (2004).

In the United States, Noriega is known for his role as Enrique in the political thriller Vantage Point (2008).

== Early life and education ==
Eduardo Noriega Gómez was born on 1 August 1973 in Santander, Spain, to a Mexican-born father and a Spanish mother. He is the youngest of seven siblings and the only one who became an actor. As a child, he devoted himself to music. When he grew up he left his law degree and his love for music and moved to Madrid to become an actor.

== Career ==
He acted in several short films by directors Amenábar, Mateo Gil and Carlos Montero and he appeared in a short role in the well-known Spanish film Stories from the Kronen, an adaptation by Montxo Armendáriz of the novel of the same name. But it was not until Tesis that he had his first starring role in a film that became one of the most important successes in the history of Spanish films. Amenábar confessed in a T.T interview that at first he did not want Noriega in Tesis, thinking he was just a "pretty face", although his collaborators thought otherwise. In the end he called him again because he preferred him over the other actors in the casting. They became close friends and later worked on different projects together, including Open Your Eyes.

With Leonardo Sbaraglia, he appeared in Plata Quemada (English: Burnt Money) (2000), an Argentine film directed by Marcelo Piñeyro. Noriega went on to star in another Piñeyro film, The Method (Spanish: El Método (2005), reuniting with Plata Quemada co-star Pablo Echarri. He appeared as Jacinto in The Devil's Backbone (2001), a film directed by Guillermo del Toro and produced by Agustín Almodóvar and Pedro Almodóvar, about life in an orphanage in the last months of the Spanish Civil War. The film also stars Marisa Paredes and Federico Luppi.

He starred as the main actor in Novo (2002), a French film directed by Jean-Pierre Limosin, where he appeared completely nude.

In 2005, he played the lead role in the independent film Che Guevara produced and directed by Josh Evans.

Noriega appeared as Conde de Guadalmedina in Alatriste (2006). Agustín Díaz Yanes directed the film, starring Viggo Mortensen, Elena Anaya, Javier Cámara, Ariadna Gil, Blanca Portillo, and Juan Echanove. Alatriste is based on five novels written by Arturo Pérez-Reverte.

Noriega came under spotlight with Vicente Aranda's drama Lolita's Club (2007) where he portrayed Raúl Fuentes and Valentín Fuentes, twin brothers of opposite characters.

He starred in Vantage Point (2008), playing Enrique, a Spanish police officer assigned to protect the local mayor, and who plays an unintended central role in the investigation of the assassination of the American president. He portrayed an escaped drug lord in The Last Stand, starring Arnold Schwarzenegger.

== Personal life ==
Noriega married his girlfriend of ten years, Trinidad Oteros, on February 8, 2011. He speaks Spanish, English, French and Catalan fluently.

== Filmography ==
Year	Title	Role	Notes	Ref.
1995	Historias del Kronen (Stories from the Kronen)		Feature film debut	
1996	Tesis (Thesis)	Bosco		
1996	Más allá del jardín (Beyond the Garden)	Ignacio		
1997	Cuestión de suerte	Julio		
1997	Abre los ojos (Open Your Eyes)	César		
1998	Cha-cha-chá	Antonio		
1999	La fuente amarilla (The Yellow Fountain)	Sergio		
1999	Nadie conoce a nadie (Nobody Knows Anybody)	Simón		
2000	Carretera y manta	Luis		
2000	El invierno de las anjanas (The Winter of the Fairies)	Eusebio		
2000	Plata quemada (Burnt Money)	Angel		
2001	El espinazo del diablo (The Devil's Backbone)	Jacinto		
2001	Visionarios (Visionaries)	Joshe		
2002	Guerreros (Warriors)	Teniente Alonso		
2003	Novo	Graham		
2003	Les mains vides (also known as Where Is Madame Catherine?)	Gerard		
2004	El Lobo (The Wolf)	Txema		
2005	Mon ange	Romain		
2005	El método (The Method)	Carlos		
2006	Souli	Carlos		
2006	Alatriste	Conde de Guadalmedina		
2007	Canciones de Amor en Lolita's Club (also known as Lolita's Club)	Raúl Fuentes / Valentín Fuentes		
2008	Che Guevara	Ernesto 'Che' Guevara		
2008	Vantage Point	Enrique		
2008	TransSiberian	Carlos		
2009	Petit Indi (also known as Little Indi)	Sergi		
2010	El mal ajeno	Diego		
2010	Agnosia	Carles		
2011	Gigola	Tony		
2011	Blackthorn	Eduardo Apodaca		
2013	The Last Stand	Gabriel Cortez		
2013	Sweet Vengeance	Miguel		
2013	Presentimientos (Inside Love)	Félix	Also writer	
2014	La Belle et la Bête (Beauty and the Beast)	Perducas		
2015	Los miércoles no existen (Wednesdays Don't Exist)	Pablo		
2016	Nuestros amantes (Our Lovers)	Carlos		
2017	Perfect Strangers	Eduardo		
2019	Les traducteurs	Javier		
2023	In the Fire	Nicolás Márquez		
2024	Dear Paris	Rafael Turmina		
2025	La increíble historia de Julia Pastrana	TBA		
2025	Parecido a un asesinato (Hidden Murder)	Nazario		

Television

Year	Work	Role	Notes	Ref.
2016	La sonata del silencio	Rafael Figueroa		
2019–2021	Hache	Alejandro Vinuesa		
2020	Inés del alma mía (Inés of My Soul)	Pedro de Valdivia		
2022	Glow and Darkness	Father Piero		
2025	The Walking Dead: Daryl Dixon	Antonio	Main role; 6 episodes	

== Accolades ==
Year	Award	Category	Work	Result	Ref.
1999	13th Goya Awards	Best Actor	Open Your Eyes	Nominated	
2005	19th Goya Awards	Best Actor	The Wolf	Nominated	
2009	18th Actors and Actresses Union Awards	Best Film Actor in a Secondary Role	Transsiberian	Nominated	
