= Mateo Gil =

Spanish film director (born 1972)

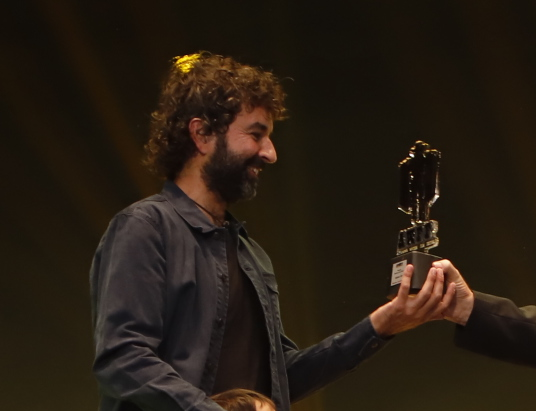
- Born: Mateo Gil Rodríguez; 23 September 1972 (age 53); Las Palmas, Spain
- Occupations: Film director, screenwriter, second unit director, assistant director, cinematographer, editor, producer
- Years active: 1992 – present
- Spouse: Andrea Antezana

Mateo Gil Rodríguez (born 23 September 1972, Las Palmas, Spain) is a Spanish film director, screenwriter, second unit director, assistant director, cinematographer, editor and producer.

He co-wrote most of Alejandro Amenábar's films with him, and also served as second unit or assistant director in two of his films. Amenábar's The Sea Inside, which Gil co-wrote, won the Academy Award for Best Foreign Language Film.

He was nominated for seven Goya Awards including Best New Director and Best Director, and won four: Best Original Screenplay for The Sea Inside and Agora, Best Adapted Screenplay for The Method and Best Short Film - Fiction for Dime que yo.

== Filmography ==
=== Film ===
| Year | Title | Director | Writer | Second unit/ assistant director | Notes |
|---|---|---|---|---|---|
| 1996 | Tesis | No | Story | Yes | Also video operator |
| 1997 | Open Your Eyes | No | Yes | Yes | |
| 1999 | Nobody Knows Anybody | Yes | Yes | No | Also actor as Boy in the bar #2 (uncredited) |
| 1999 | La lengua de las mariposas | No | No | Yes | |
| 2004 | The Sea Inside | No | Yes | No | |
| 2005 | The Method | No | Yes | No | |
| 2009 | Agora | No | Yes | Yes | |
| 2011 | Blackthorn | Yes | No | No | |
| 2016 | Realive | Yes | Yes | No | |
| 2018 | The Laws of Thermodynamics | Yes | Yes | No | |
| 2024 | Pedro Páramo | No | Yes | No | |

=== Short film ===
| Year | Title | Director | Writer | Second unit/ assistant director | Other | Notes |
|---|---|---|---|---|---|---|
| 1992 | Himenóptero | No | No | No | Yes | Cinematographer |
| 1993 | Antes del beso | Yes | No | No | No | |
| 1994 | Soñé que te mataba | Yes | No | No | No | |
| 1995 | Luna | No | No | No | Yes | Voice actor as Hitchhicker |
| 1998 | Allanamiento de morada | Yes | Yes | No | No | |
| 2008 | Dime que yo | Yes | Yes | No | Yes | Also producer |
| 2011 | Hombre con nube | No | No | Yes | No | |

=== Television ===
| Year | Title | Director | Writer | Executive producer | Notes |
|---|---|---|---|---|---|
| 2006 | Películas para no dormir: Regreso a Moira | Yes | Yes | No | TV film Also editor |
| 2020 | The Minions of Midas | Yes | Yes | Yes | Limited series Also creator |
