= La Celestina (1996 film) =

- Theatrical release poster
- Directed by: Gerardo Vera
- Written by: Rafael Azcona; Gerardo Vera; Francisco Rico (add.)
- Screenplay by: Rafael Azcona
- Based on: La Celestina by Fernando de Rojas
- Produced by: Andrés Vicente Gómez
- Starring: Penélope Cruz; Juan Diego Botto; Maribel Verdú; Terele Pávez; Jordi Mollà; Nancho Novo; Nathalie Seseña; Carlos Fuentes; Candela Peña; Anna Lizarán; Sergio Villanueva; Ángel de Andrés López; Lluís Homar
- Cinematography: José Luis López-Linares
- Edited by: Pedro del Rey
- Production companies: Sogetel; Lolafilms
- Release date: 8 November 1996
- Running time: 92 min
- Country: Spain
- Language: Spanish

La Celestina is a 1996 Spanish drama directed by Gerardo Vera and written by Rafael Azcona, Gerardo Vera and Francisco Rico based on 1499 novel of the same title by Fernando de Rojas which stars Penélope Cruz, Juan Diego Botto, Maribel Verdú, and Terele Pávez.

== Cast ==
- Penélope Cruz as Melibea
- Terele Pávez as Celestina
- Juan Diego Botto as Calisto
- Maribel Verdú as Areúsa
- Jordi Mollà as Pármeno
- Nancho Novo as Sempronio
- Nathalie Seseña as Lucrecia
- Carlos Fuentes as Sosia
- Candela Peña as Elicia
- Anna Lizarán as Alisa
- Sergio Villanueva as Tristán
- Ángel de Andrés López as Centurio
- Lluís Homar as Pleberio
- Ana Risueño as Poncia
- Rodrigo García as Crito
- Amparo Gómez Ramos as Ana
- Joaquín Notario as verdugo
- José Colomina as Traso
- Aquilino Gamazo as Patibulario
- Igor Otaegui as Patibulario

== Production ==
The film was shot in Cáceres, Escalona, Lupiana, Nuevo Baztán, and Trujillo. Shooting locations included the Monastery of Lupiana.

== Release ==
The film was released theatrically in Spain on 8 November 1996.

== See also ==
- List of Spanish films of 1996

== Bibliography ==
- Villalobos Graillet, José Eduardo (2021). "La Celestina en el cine español de la democracia. Adaptación, censura y recepción de la recreación cinematográfica de Gerardo Vera". Celestinesca. 45. Valencia: Universitat de València: 129–166. doi:10.7203/Celestinesca.45.21331. ISSN 2695-7183.
