= Thesis (1996 film) =

1996 Spanish horror film by Alejandro Amenábar

- Poster
- Spanish: Tesis
- Directed by: Alejandro Amenábar
- Screenplay by: Alejandro Amenábar
- Story by: Alejandro Amenábar; Mateo Gil
- Produced by: Emiliano Otegui; José Luis Cuerda
- Starring: Ana Torrent; Fele Martínez; Eduardo Noriega; Miguel Picazo; Javier Elorriaga
- Cinematography: Hans Burmann
- Edited by: María Elena Sáinz de Rozas
- Music by: Alejandro Amenábar
- Production companies: Las Producciones del Escorpión; Sogepaq
- Distributed by: United International Pictures
- Release date: 12 April 1996
- Running time: 125 minutes
- Country: Spain
- Language: Spanish
- Budget: €721,214
- Box office: 134 million ₧ (Spain)

Thesis (Spanish: Tesis) is a 1996 Spanish horror-thriller film. It is the feature debut of director-writer Alejandro Amenábar, who wrote the story with Mateo Gil. It stars Ana Torrent, Fele Martínez and Eduardo Noriega.

The film revolves around a college student in cinema (Torrent) interested in snuff films for her graduade thesis who finds clues on people directly involved in the making of one, putting her life at risk.

At the 11th Goya Awards, Thesis won a leading seven awards, including Best Film and Best Original Screenplay.

== Plot ==
In November 1995 in Madrid, Ángela, a university student in cinema, is planning to write a thesis on audiovisual violence and the family. She asks her thesis director, Figueroa, to help her find the most violent films in the school's library, and seeks out a fellow student, Chema, who is known for collecting pornographic and violent videos, to see some of the latter. Although the two initially scarcely get along, with Ángela being disgusting by Chema's offputting demeanor and love for violence, they eventually bond. Meanwhile, Figueroa finds a tape hidden in the school's audiovisual archives, and the next day, Ángela finds him dead of an apparent asthma attack in the screening room, retrieving the tape. A younger professor, Castro, takes over the supervision of Ángela's thesis project.

Watching the tape, Ángela and Chema discover it is a snuff film in which a woman is tortured, killed, and disemboweled. Chema recognizes the victim as Vanessa, a student from their university who went missing two years prior. He is able to determine that the killer used a specific camera model. Ángela later finds and follows Bosco, a young man using this specific camera, but he notices her in return and sees she carries newspaper clippings about Vanessa's disappearance. Ángela pretends she is filming a report about the disappearance and asks to interview Bosco, who claims to have information about the case. In the interview, Bosco insists that Vanessa must have run away with a boyfriend because she sent a note to her family saying that she was in love. Ángela is willing to accept Bosco's innocence, although Chema is doubtful.

Soon after, Ángela realizes that Bosco is inside the house waiting for her. Although she is initially frightened, Bosco charms her family and they invite him to stay for dinner. Once alone, Bosco attempts to seduce Ángela but she resists his advances. At the school, Chema asks a security guard to see the security tape of the video library on the night of Figueroa's death. That night, Ángela has a dream that Bosco threatens her with a knife, performs oral sex on her while videotaping it, and then stabs her.

Castro questions Ángela about Figueroa's death, showing the security footage of her discovering the body. They are interrupted by a call from Chema warning Ángela that Castro is involved in the snuff films, and she leaves his office under a false excuse.

Bosco's girlfriend, Yolanda, confronts Ángela and explains that she, Vanessa, Bosco, and Chema, who was once a friend of Bosco, had gone to a series of director's workshops with Castro two years previously, stating that she left when they made Vanessa take off her clothes for a short film, that Chema was obsessed with snuff films, and that she believes he killed Vanessa after the workshop ended. Later, Chema admits to Ángela that he knew Bosco, but claims he also left the workshop when things got out of hand.

At night, Chema shows Ángela a hidden tunnel he has discovered in the school's video library, where they find shelves of video tapes like Vanessa's, indicating that many other women may have been murdered in other snuff films. The two are suddenly trapped inside the tunnel, and eventually fall asleep in each other's arms, but when Ángela wakes, she is alone, and is captured and tied to a chair by Castro, who is videotaping her. He explains that he only edited the snuff videos and did not murder anyone, although she is to be his first. However, Chema appears and attack Castro, who is shot dead with his own gun during the brawl.

Back home, Ángela is terrified to learn that her sister Sena, is at a party with Bosco. She hurries to the party, and, to convince the enamored Sena that Bosco has no feelings for her, kisses him in front of everyone.

The next day, Ángela and Chema agree to go to the police. While Chema is taking a shower, Ángela finds the same kind of specific camera among his belongings, which contains a tape showing Ángela from outside her bedroom window. Convinced that Chema has been stalking her, Ángela flees. She goes back home to advise Sena to remain safe, then takes a taxi to Bosco's house. At Bosco's house, he and Ángela talk about their relationship. Suddenly, Chema appears and attack Bosco, but is eventually overpowered. While Bosco fetches rope to tie up Chema, he tells Ángela to look in Bosco's garage; she does does, and recognizes the room from Vanessa's snuff film. Bosco, the one behind the videos, ties up Ángela and explains how he intends to torture and kill her. However, she cuts her bonds with a knife, slashes Bosco, grabs his gun, and shoots him dead.

Ángela later visits a recovering Chema in the hospital. On the television in his room, an announcer states that the bodies of six women were found at Bosco's home. Ángela gives Chema a book inscribed with an invitation to have coffee with her and tells him she is going to abandon her thesis. As they leave, the announcer states that footage from a snuff film will be shown on air, to the fascination of the many viewers.

== Cast ==
Main cast:

- Ana Torrent as Ángela Márquez
- Fele Martínez as Chema
- Eduardo Noriega as Bosco Herranz
- Xabier Elorriaga as Professor Jorge Castro
- Miguel Picazo as Professor Figueroa
- Nieves Herranz as Sena Márquez
- Rosa Campillo as Yolanda
- Paco Hernández as Ángela's Father
- Rosa Ávila as Ángela's Mother
- Olga Margallo as Vanessa Romero
- Teresa Castanedo as News Broadcaster

== Critical response ==
As a film made by a film student about film students, much of Tesis is metafilmic and comments on the Spanish film industry, Hollywood influence and the voyeuristic nature of the horror and snuff genres. Following the aesthetic of the American horror genre, Angela operates as the "Final Girl", or resourceful female protagonist that defies stereotypical feminine traits. Although Tesis fits the suspenseful mold of a Hollywood horror flick rather than its symbol-rich European counterpart, according to European film critic Marguerite la Caze, Tesis has a thesis: "human beings, no matter how well-meaning, are attracted to violence and death in all its forms". Joe Leydon assessed that Amenábar "provides an inventive plot and a sufficient supply of red herrings".

Tesis has generated much critical analysis due to its study of the fascination of violence. Film critic Leora Lev discusses Angela's ethical rejection and simultaneous attraction to violent images as this film's primary conversation. Lev states that Angela's psychosexual conflict with both the snuff film and the murderer, Bosco, is emblematic of the culture that consumes violent films and reality television series.

On the film-critics aggregator Rotten Tomatoes, Thesis has a critical rating of 83% based on 12 reviews.

== Accolades ==
Year	Award	Category	Nominee(s)	Result	Ref.
1997	11th Goya Awards	Best Film		Won	
1997	11th Goya Awards	Best New Director	Alejandro Amenábar	Won	
1997	11th Goya Awards	Best Original Screenplay	Alejandro Amenábar	Won	
1997	11th Goya Awards	Best Actress	Ana Torrent	Nominated	
1997	11th Goya Awards	Best New Actor	Fele Martínez	Won	
1997	11th Goya Awards	Best Editing	María Elena Sáinz de Rozas	Won	
1997	11th Goya Awards	Best Production Supervision	Emiliano Otegui	Won	
1997	11th Goya Awards	Best Sound	Alfonso Pino, Daniel Goldstein, Ricardo Steinberg	Won	

== See also ==
- List of Spanish films of 1996
