= Emilio Buale =

Equatorial Guinean-Spanish actor

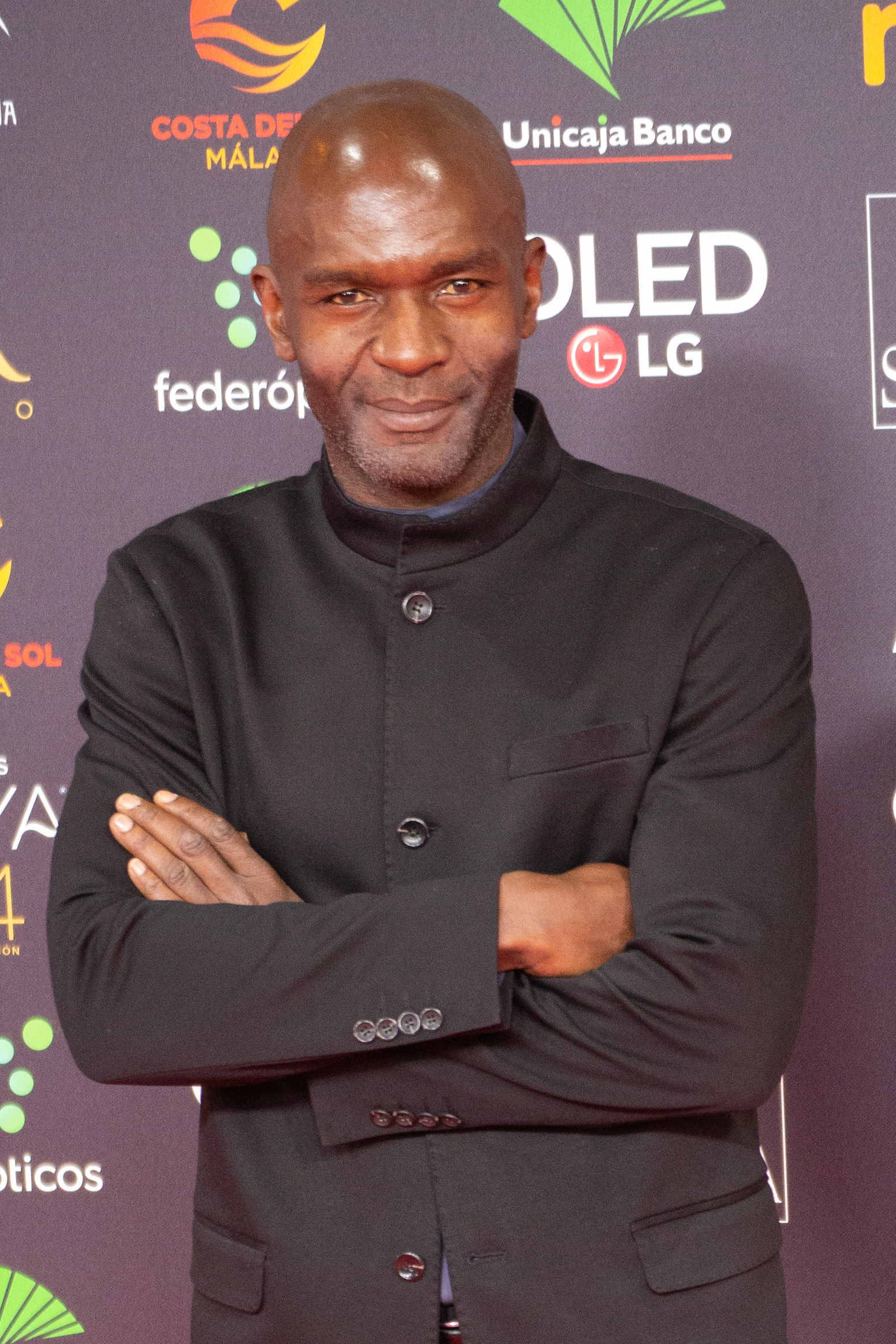
- Buale in 2020
- Born: Ludwig Emilio Buale Coka; 26 November 1972 (age 53); Malabo, Equatorial Guinea
- Occupation: Actor

Ludwig Emilio Buale Coka (born 26 November 1972) is an Equatoguinean-born Spanish actor, known internationally for his role as Baharat in the science fiction-horror movie The Platform (2019).

== Early life and career ==
Born in Equatorial Guinea of Bubi descent, Buale moved to Spain, with his parents and brothers, when he was six years old. He had no intention of becoming an actor until one day, in 1995, when casting director Paco Pino discovered him as they both waited in a subway station in Madrid. Pino needed a black actor to play Ombasi, one of the main characters of Imanol Uribe's Bwana (1996). Before that, Emilio was studying to become a construction engineer, as well as working as a fireman. He accepted Pino's offer traveling to Almería two weeks later for the filming of the movie. Buale made his debut, along with two well-known Spanish actors Andrés Pajares and María Barranco.

Buale continued getting work in films, TV series and, especially, in theatre. He was a member of the National Classical Theater Company of Spain for a couple of years appearing in many of stage productions such as "La entretenida", "Amar después de la muerte", "Los chicos de la banda" and "Yonquis y Yanquis".

== Personal life ==
Buale is a polyglot fluent in Spanish, English, French and Bube. He continues to work as a fireman in Madrid. In fact, he has played a fireman in a few television series and films:

- Código fuego (2003)
- Semen, una historia de amor (2005)
- and an episode of the third season of La que se avecina (2007)

== Films ==
- Bwana - 1996
- Adiós con el corazón - 2000
- Mi hijo Arturo - 2000
- Salvajes - 2001
- Ilegal - 2003
- Semen, una historia de amor - 2005
- Hienas - 2009
- The Platform (El Hoyo) - 2019

== Short films ==
- Cien maneras de hacer el pollo al txilindrón (1997) by Kepa Sojo
- Feliz Navidad (1998) by Óscar del Caz
- Impotencia (2002) by Andoni de Carlos
- Así fue mi sueño (2003) by Javier Albalá
- ¿Y tú qué harías (2003) by Emiliano Melgarejo
- El niño que jugaba con los trenes (2004) by Jorge Blas
- Chantal Lis (2004) by Rut Suso and Maria Pavon
- Cara Sucia (2004) by Santiago Zannou
- Salomón (2007) by Ignacio Lasierra
- Cíclope (2009) by Carlos Morett

== Television ==
- Tío Willy (1998) by Eduardo Ladrón de Guevara
- Médico de Familia (1998) by Daniel Écija
- Mediterráneo (1999) by Antonio Hernández
- Pratos combinados (2000) by Chema Fernández
- Arrayán (2001) by Eva Bermúdez de Castro, Jaime D. Triviño y Santiago Pumarola
- Código fuego (2003) by Miguel Ángel Díez y Eva Lesmes
- Hospital Central (2005) by José Mª Caro y Carlos Gil
- Los Serrano (2007) by Daniel Écija
- El comisario (2008) by Ignacio del Moral
- Cazadores de Hombres (2008) by Joan Barbero, Verónica Fernández and Aitor Gabilondo
- La que se avecina (2009) by Alberto Caballero, Laura Caballero, Daniel Deorador
- Amar en tiempos revueltos (2009) by Rodolfo Sirera
- Sin tetas no hay paraíso (2009)
- La fuga (2012)
