= Gracia Querejeta =

Spanish filmmaker (born 1962)

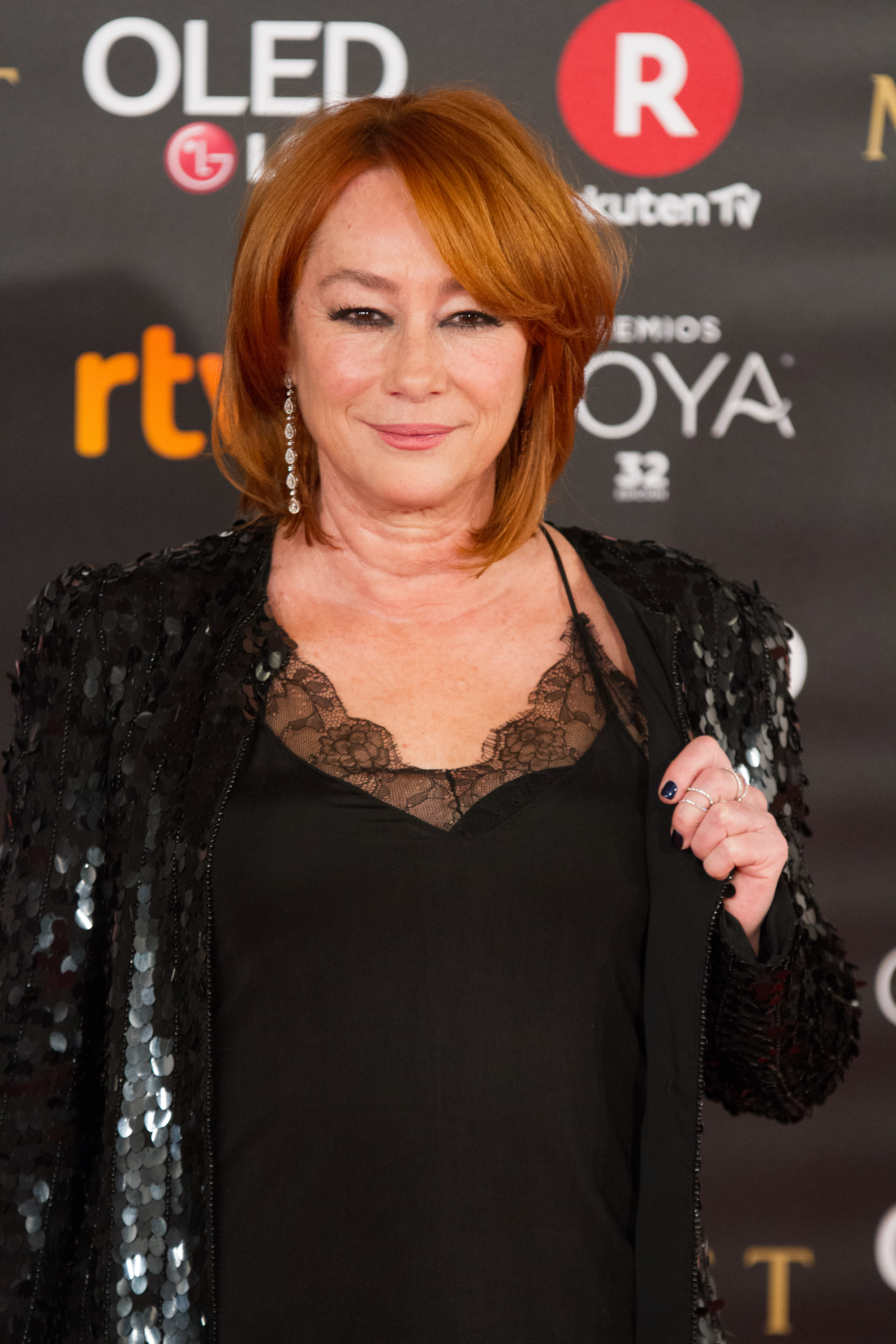
- At the 32nd Goya Awards in 2018
- Born: Gracia Querejeta Marín; 13 August 1962 (age 63); Madrid, Spain
- Occupations: Film director; screenwriter; film producer; actress
- Father: Elías Querejeta

Gracia Querejeta Marín (Spanish pronunciation: [ˈɡɾaθja keɾeˈxeta]; born 13 August 1962) is a Spanish filmmaker.

== Biography ==
She was born in Madrid in 1962, daughter to film producer Elías Querejeta and costume designer María del Carmen Marín. She studied Ancient History in the Universidad Complutense de Madrid. She worked as an actress before developing her directorial career. Her debut as director was in 1988 with short films as Tres en la marca. Her first feature film was Una estación de paso (1992).

== Films ==
=== Short films ===
- Tres en la marca (1988), chapter 7 Serie 7 Huellas
- El viaje del agua (1990)
- La adolescencia (1992)
- El trabajo de rodar (1993)
- Alfredo di Stefano (1997)
- Primarias (1998) Documentary with Fernando León de Aranoa and Azucena Rodríguez.
- Felices 140 (2015)

=== Feature films ===
- Robert Rylands' Last Journey (El último viaje de Robert Rylands) (1994)
- By My Side Again (Cuando vuelvas a mi lado) (1999)
- Héctor (2004)
- Seven Billiard Tables (Siete mesas de billar francés) (2007)
- 15 Years and One Day (2013)
- Felices 140 (2015)
- Crime Wave (Ola de crímenes) (2018)
- Invisibles (2020)
- La buena suerte (2025)

=== Actress ===
- Las secretas intenciones (1969)
- Dulces horas by Carlos Saura, actress (1981)
- Las palabras de Max by Emilio Martínez Lázaro, actress (1975)

== Awards ==
- Héctor (2004). Biznaga de Oro for Best Film at the Malaga Film Festival (Festival de Málaga de Cine Español).
- Cuando vuelvas a mi lado (1999). Special Jury Mention in Festival de San Sebastián
- Una estación de paso (1992). Jury Special prize in Semana de Cine de Valladolid.
- Tres en la marca, (1988) Premio Teatro Arriaga en el Festival de Cortometrajes de Bilbao.
- El último viaje de Robert Rylands (1994). Best Director, Best Movie, Best Photography, Best Film Editing and Best Music in Círculo de Escritores Cinematográficos.
- El viaje del agua, (1990) premio Goya Best Spanish Documentar

== See also ==
- List of female film and television directors
