= Alejandro Amenábar =

Spanish-Chilean film director, screenwriter and composer

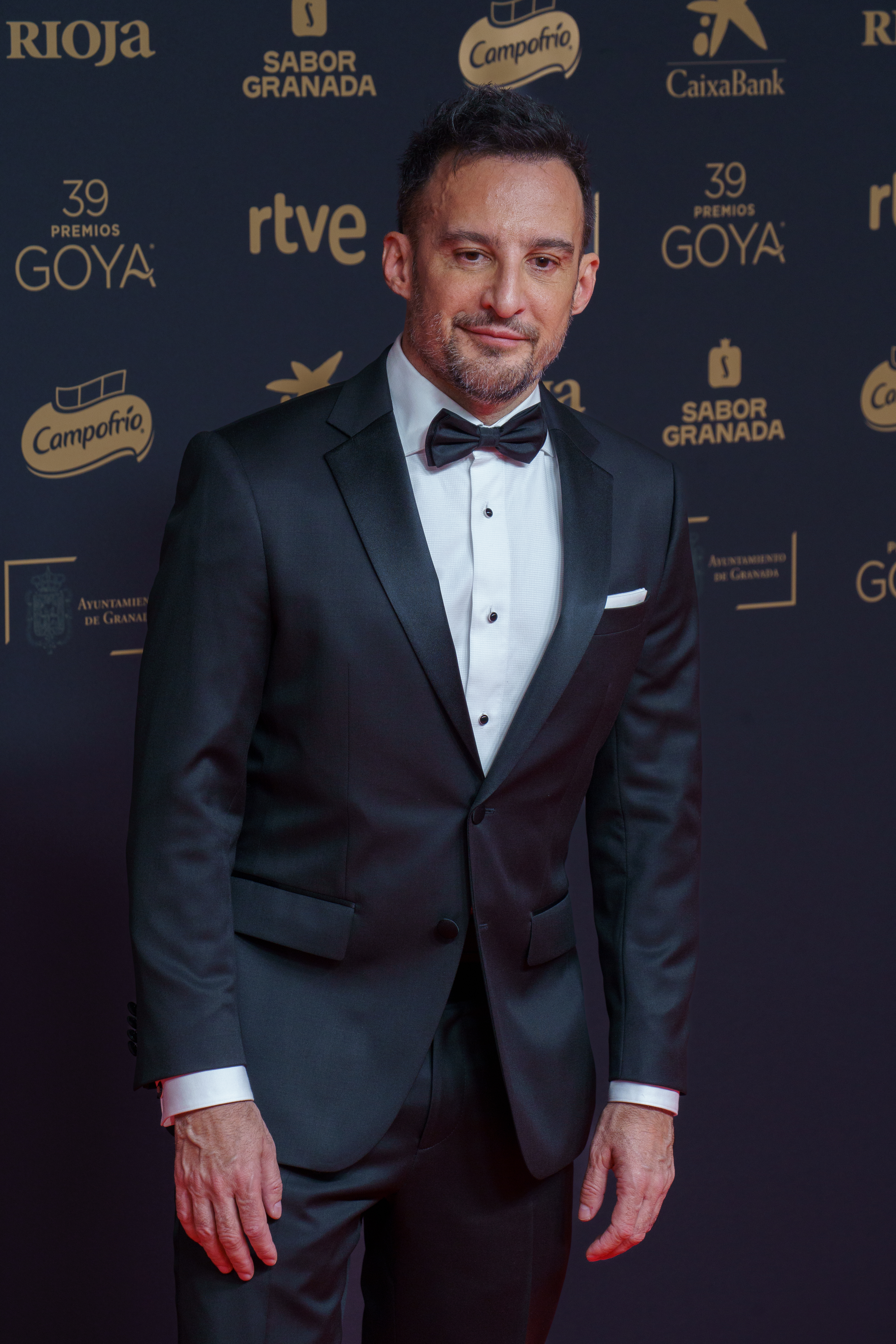
- Amenábar in 2025
- Born: Alejandro Fernando Amenábar Cantos; 31 March 1972 (age 54); Santiago, Chile
- Citizenship: Chile; Spain
- Occupations: Film director; screenwriter; composer
- Years active: 1992–present
- Spouse: David Blanco (m. 2015; div. 2019)

Alejandro Fernando Amenábar Cantos (Spanish: [aleˈxandɾo ameˈnaβaɾ]; born 31 March 1972) is a Chilean-Spanish film director, screenwriter and composer. He has won nine Goya Awards—including Best Director for his 2001 film The Others—and two European Film Awards among other honors; he also accepted an Academy Award for Best Foreign Language Film on behalf of Spain for The Sea Inside. He has written (or co-written) the screenplays to all seven of his films and composed almost all of their soundtracks.

== Early life ==
Amenábar was born in Santiago, Chile, to a Chilean father, Hugo Ricardo Amenábar, and a Spanish mother, Josefina Cantos. He has both Chilean and Spanish citizenship. His father worked as a technician at General Electric, while his mother decided to stay at home and take care of the children. Alejandro is the younger of two brothers; his older brother, Ricardo, was born in 1969.

Josefina's older sister had moved to the capital of Chile, Santiago, and she invited Josefina to join her there. In Santiago, Josefina met Hugo. Alejandro was born there in 1972.

In August 1973, his family moved to Spain. The family settled in Madrid, living in a camping caravan. When Alejandro was six years old, they moved to a complex on the outskirts of the town of Paracuellos de Jarama (Madrid).

== Studies ==
Alejandro and his brother did not watch much television. From the age of 15, Alejandro would dedicate his time to going to the cinema to watch movies. Other than theater, his passions were writing stories and reading books. According to Alejandro's mother, Alejandro had the capacity to absorb everything he read. As a child, he also composed melodies with the keyboard and guitar with the same ease as when he wrote his stories.

Alejandro started his studies at the Padres Escolapios de Getafe school. In his second year of high school, he transferred to the Alameda de Osuna Institute, in the north-east of Madrid. The school was not close to where Alejandro was living; however, his parents, who were very concerned about his education, decided to enroll him in that institute because it was known as one of the best schools in Madrid.

Before he became a director, Alejandro worked as a stock boy in a warehouse and as a gardener, until he had enough money to buy his own home camera. He did not want to start his university studies in cinema before ever having touched a camera. Amenábar entered the Information Sciences Faculty at Madrid's Complutense University, where after numerous scholastic failures he decided to give up studying cinema and he began directing. The advantage from having attended university was that he met people who later in life would become very important throughout his career (that was the case for Sergio Rozas and Carlos Montero, through whom he met Eduardo Noriega). At university, he also met Mateo Gil, a friend and companion, and the pair made a pact to always support each other's projects.

== Film career ==
Between 1991 and 1994, Amenábar made three short films which in a very significant way influenced his first full-length films: La Cabeza, Himenóptero, and Luna.

Meeting José Luis Cuerda helped Alejandro greatly in his career. A friend of José Luis Cuerda gave him the script of Himenóptero so he would give his opinion. Thereafter, Cuerda was interested in Amenábar's work. This led to him becoming the producer of Thesis (1996), which is one of Amenábar's most recognized films, putting his name on the map. Thesis was a thriller set in the School of Information Sciences at the Complutense University of Madrid. Through this film, he gained the attention of critics in the Berlin Film Festival and won seven Goyas, including Best Picture and Best New Director.

In 1997 he made Abre Los Ojos, a science fiction movie that had notable success at international festivals such as Berlin and Tokyo. Impressed by the movie, Tom Cruise bought the rights to adapt and produce the film, starring in a remake, Vanilla Sky.

His third full length film was The Others, a ghost story starring Nicole Kidman. It was very successful at an international level, especially in Spain, where it was the most viewed film that year. The Others was also very popular in the United States, where it was at the top of the box office for several weeks. The film premiered at the Venice Film Festival in 2001, won eight Goyas, including the Best Picture and Best Director, and was nominated for best European Film Movie.

In 2004 Amenábar released The Sea Inside, a real life-story about a quadriplegic Ramón Sampedro (played by Javier Bardem), which addressed issues such as euthanasia, abortion, or “the right to a dignified life.” The movie won 14 Goyas, including best movie and best director, and an Academy Award for Best Foreign Language Film in 2004.

In 2008 Amenábar released his next film, called Mists of Time; however he later changed the name to Agora. The film starred big-name actors including Rachel Weisz and Max Minghella. Agora premiered on October 9, 2009, and with a budget of 50 million euros, it was the most expensive Spanish film in history until Society of the Snow.

After a hiatus of almost seven years, Amenábar returned in 2015 with the thriller Regression, starring Ethan Hawke and Emma Watson. The film had its world premiere at the San Sebastián International Film Festival in September 2015, where reviews were lukewarm.

Amenábar is also the composer of the soundtrack of his films, as well as others, such as Butterfly's Tongue directed by José Luis Cuerda and Nobody Knows Anybody directed by Mateo Gil.

== Personal life ==
In 2004, Amenábar came out as gay. On 18 July 2015, he married David Blanco. Their divorce was finalised in 2019. Amenábar was raised Catholic, but later became agnostic and is now atheist.

== Filmography ==
=== Film ===
Year	Title	Director	Writer	Producer	Composer	Notes
1996	Thesis	Yes	Yes	Associate	Yes	
1997	Open Your Eyes	Yes	Yes	No	Yes	
1999	Butterfly's Tongue	No	No	No	Yes	
1999	Nobody Knows Anybody	No	No	No	Yes	
2001	The Others	Yes	Yes	No	Yes	
2004	The Sea Inside	Yes	Yes	Yes	Yes	Also editor
2009	Agora	Yes	Yes	Yes	No	
2010	For the Good of Others	No	No	Yes	No	
2015	Regression	Yes	Yes	Yes	No	
2019	While at War	Yes	Yes	Yes	Yes	
2025	The Captive	Yes	Yes	Yes	Yes	

=== Short film ===
Year	Title	Director	Writer	Producer	Composer	Editor	Actor	Role	Notes
1991	La cabeza	Yes	Yes	Yes	Yes	Yes	Yes	Extraño	
1992	Himenópetro	Yes	Yes	Yes	Yes	Yes	Yes	Bosco	
1993	En casa de Diego	No	No	No	Yes	Yes	No	—N/a	Also cinematographer
1993	Antes del beso	No	No	No	Yes	Yes	No	—N/a	Also cinematographer
1994	Al lado del Atlas	No	No	No	Yes	No	No	—N/a	Also sound editor
1994	Luna	Yes	Yes	Yes	Yes	Yes	Yes	Camarero	Also sound
1995	Luna	Yes	Yes	No	Yes	No	Yes	Camarero	Remake of his medium length film Luna (1994)
1997	Como se hizo Tesis	No	No	Executive	Yes	No	Yes	Self	Documentary Short
1998	Allanamiento de morada	No	No	No	Yes	No	No	—N/a	
2004	El soñador	No	Idea	Yes	No	No	No	—N/a	
2015	Vale	Yes	Yes	No	No	No	No	—N/a	Advertising short
2017	Danielle	Yes	Yes	No	No	No	No	—N/a	Advertising short

=== Television ===
Year	Title	Director	Writer	Notes
2021	La Fortuna	Yes	Yes	Miniseries
