= Nacho Ruiz Capillas =

Spanish film editor

Nacho Ruiz Capillas (born 1966) is a Spanish film editor.

== Life and career ==
He was born in Madrid in 1966. He is a recurring collaborator of directors Daniel Sánchez Arévalo, Icíar Bollaín, Gracia Querejeta, and Fernando León de Aranoa.

He won the Goya Award for Best Editing for The Others (2001), and was nominated for Butterfly's Tongue (1999), Mondays in the Sun (2002), Seven Billiard Tables (2007), The Blind Sunflowers (2008), Agora (2009), Fat People (2009), Family United (2013), A Perfect Day (2015), Maixabel (2021), The 47 (2024). In 2019, he was invited to join the AMPAS.
