= Butterfly's Tongue =

- American DVD cover
- Directed by: José Luis Cuerda
- Written by: Rafael Azcona
- Starring: Fernando Fernán Gómez; Manuel Lozano; Uxía Blanco; Gonzalo Uriarte; Alexis de los Santos; Elena Fernández; Tamar Novas
- Cinematography: Javier Salmones
- Edited by: Ignacio Cayetano Rodriguez; Nacho Ruiz Capillas
- Music by: Alejandro Amenábar
- Production company: Sociedad General de Televisión (Sogetel)
- Distributed by: Warner Sogefilms
- Release date: 24 September 1999 (Spain)
- Running time: 96 minutes
- Country: Spain
- Language: Spanish
- Budget: €2,211,800
- Box office: €4,632,493

Butterfly's Tongue or Butterfly (Spanish: La lengua de las mariposas [la ˈleŋɡwa ðe las maɾiˈposas]; may be more literally translated as "The Tongue of the Butterflies"), is a 1999 Spanish film directed by José Luis Cuerda. The film centers on Moncho (Manuel Lozano) and his coming-of-age experience in Galicia in 1936. Moncho develops a close relationship with his teacher Don Gregorio (Fernando Fernán Gómez), who introduces the boy to different things in the world. While the story centres on Moncho's ordinary coming-of-age experiences, tensions related to the looming Spanish Civil War occasionally interrupt Moncho's personal growth and daily life.

The film is adapted from three short stories from the 1996 book Que me queres, amor? by Galician author Manuel Rivas. The short stories are "A lingua das bolboretas", "Un saxo na néboa" and "Carmiña".

The film received critical acclaim. It was nominated for the 2000 Goya Award for Best Picture and won the Goya Award for Best Adapted Screenplay. Butterfly's Tongue has a 96% rating on Rotten Tomatoes.

== Cast ==
- Fernando Fernán Gómez as Don Gregorio
- Manuel Lozano as Moncho
- Elena Fernandez as Carmiña
- Uxia Blanco as Rosa
- Gonzalo Martín Uriarte as Ramón
- Alexis de los Santos as Andrés

== Plot ==
In a Galician town in the 1930s, a young boy, Moncho, goes to school for the first time and is taught by Don Gregorio about life and literature. At first, Moncho is afraid of the teachers hitting him, since that was the standard procedure. However, he is relieved to discover that Don Gregorio does not hit his pupils. Don Gregorio is unlike the other teachers; he builds a special relationship with Moncho, teaching him to love learning. Don Gregorio teaches him about the butterfly’s tongue on a field trip through the woods, with Moncho having an asthma attack and being assisted by Don Gregorio. Don Gregorio also builds a special relationship with Moncho's father, who is a Republican like him. At this time in Spain, the Republican and the Nationalist factions are fighting a civil war, forcing people to take sides. Moncho's mother is indifferent towards the Republic, her main concern being belief in God; she eventually sides with the Nationalist rebels.

When Nationalists take control of the town, they round up known Republicans, including Don Gregorio. As Moncho's father is a Republican, his family fears that he too will be arrested if the Nationalists discover his political leanings. In order to protect themselves, the family goes to the town square to taunt the captured Republicans as they are paraded out of the courthouse and put on a truck. The film ends with Moncho, despite his continued great affection for his friend and teacher, yelling hateful insults and throwing rocks at Don Gregorio and the other Republicans, as instructed by his mother, while the truck carries them away. The last thing Moncho yells are the words for the tongue of a butterfly, espiritrompa (Spanish for "proboscis"), a favorite word taught to him by Don Gregorio, in an attempt to let his dear friend know that he does not truly mean the words he is yelling.
