= Ángel de Andrés López =

Spanish actor

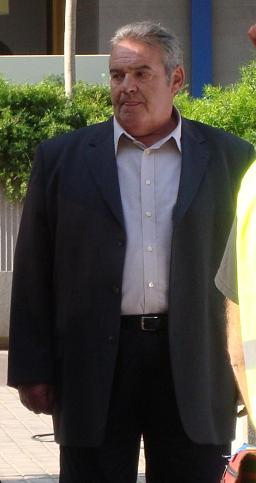
- Ángel de Andrés López in 2008
- Born: 23 October 1951; Madrid, Spain
- Died: 4 May 2016 (aged 64); Miraflores de la Sierra, Spain
- Occupation: Actor
- Years active: 1977–2015

Ángel de Andrés López (23 October 1951 – 4 May 2016) was a Spanish actor. He appeared in more than 60 films and television shows between 1977 and 2015. He died at his home in Miraflores de la Sierra from natural causes.

== Selected filmography ==
Year	Film	Role	Notes
2009–2010	Pelotas	Florencio Sáez	TV series (24 episodes)
2006–2007	Manolo y Benito Corporeision	Manolo Jumilla	TV series (12 episodes)
2004	Tiovivo c. 1950	Acisclo	Film
2002	800 Bullets	Cheyenne	Film
1998–2001	Manos a la obra	Manolo Jumilla	TV series (130 episodes)
1996	Taxi	Velasco	Film
1996	La Celestina	Centurio	Film
1984	What Have I Done to Deserve This?	Antonio	Film
