= Andrés Pajares =

Spanish actor

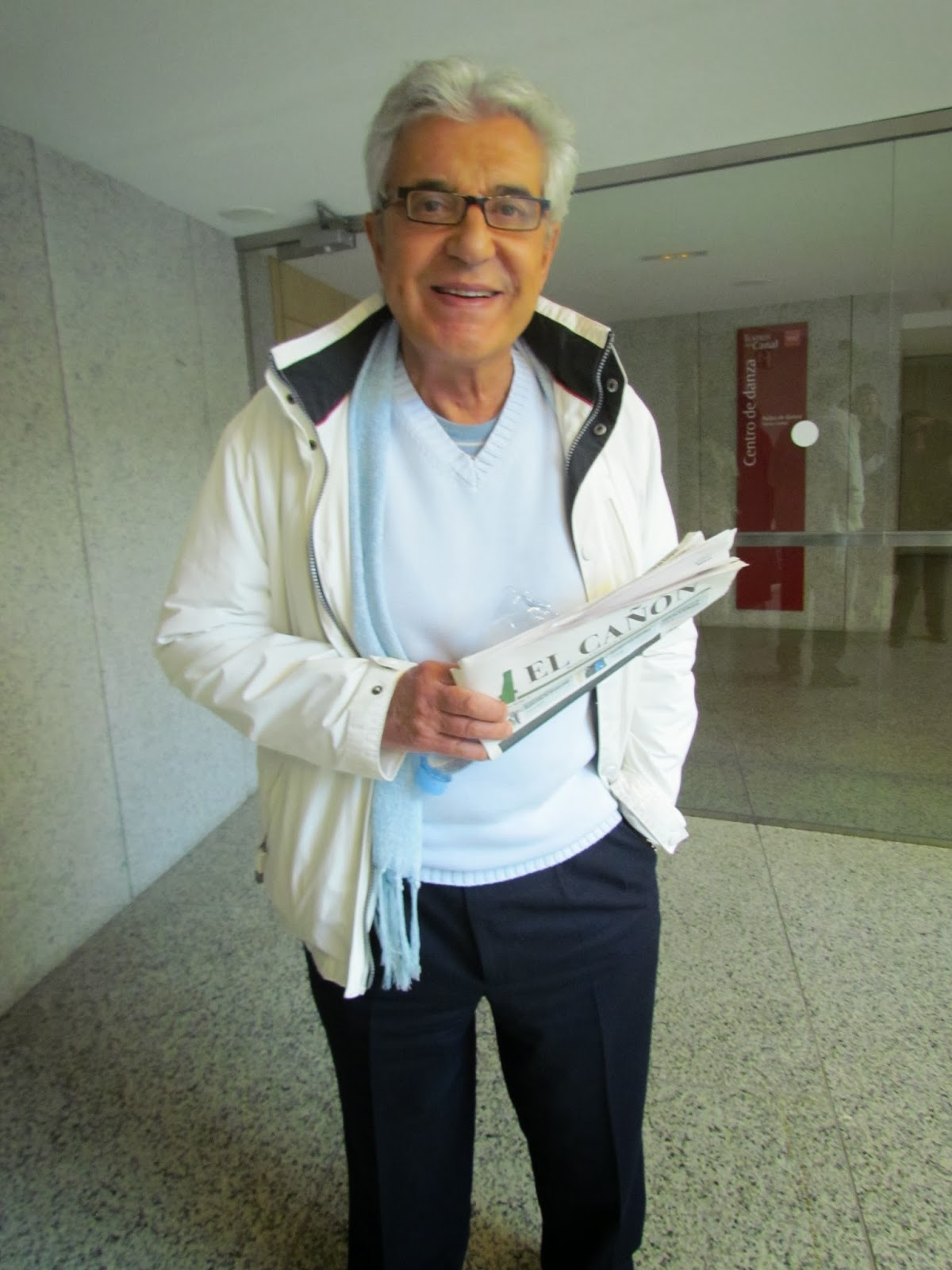
- Pajares in 2014
- Born: Andrés Pajares Martín; 6 April 1940 (age 85); Madrid, Spain
- Occupation: Actor

Andrés Pajares Martín (Madrid 6 April 1940) is a Spanish actor, director, writer and comedian, in theater, film and television.

He started as a comedian in 1968, and during his early career he mixed regular shows with theater performances both as a comedian and as an actor. Although he also entered the world of films as an extra in the late 1960s, it was not until the end of the 1970s when he reached popularity.

He is known as an actor for movies like ¡Ay Carmela!, for which he received a Goya Award for Best Actor in 1991, and his eleven movies with Fernando Esteso directed by Mariano Ozores and produced between 1979 and 1984. With more than forty films in his career, he has also directed three movies, two of them also written by him, and wrote the script for another movie. In television, he is also known for the series ¡Ay, Señor, Señor! which were broadcast during 1994 and 1995.

During all his time he continued creating humoristic shows for television and theaters, and has received numerous awards for his accomplishments in the entertainment industry.

== Biography ==
He began his career as a comic actor in nightclubs and in the musical companies of Antonio Machín, Manolo Escobar, and Tony Leblanc. He headlined a bill for the first time alongside Antonio Casal and performed with Sara Montiel and Rocío Jurado before forming his own revue company (Más vale pájaro en mano, Del coro al caño, La risa está servida). He alternated between the stage and café-theater, a specialty in which he achieved particular prominence, and recorded several albums at the same time.

He also appeared on numerous television programs, especially with a character, El currante, whom he himself brought to the cinema years later.

He began to participate in film projects with some regularity in the late 1960s, occasionally in roles that exploited the clichés of young homosexuals or effeminate men of the time. See Un lujo a su alcance (1975), by Ramón Fernández, among others.

In 1979, his film career was relaunched, forming a comic duo with Fernando Esteso. Pajares and Esteso worked together on eleven films directed by Mariano Ozores, which achieved great success and popularity nationwide. The duo worked in cinema until 1983, when they shot La Lola nos lleva al huerto, their last film together. Four years later, they reunited, this time on stage, in Neil Simon play The Odd Couple, directed by José Osuna.

Having separated professionally from Fernando Esteso, he continued working as a film and television actor. In 1990, his acting career reached its peak thanks to ¡Ay, Carmela!, for which he won, among other awards, a Goya from the Academy and the award for best actor at the Montreal Film Festival.

In 1996, he appeared as an actor alongside María Barranco in Bwana and later in television productions such as ¡Ay, Señor, Señor! (1994–1995) and Tío Willy (1998–1999).

Aside from his professional career, he is also known in Spain for his private life and his family. From time to time, he appears on television talk shows and in Gossip magazine.

In 2008, coinciding with his 50th anniversary as an artist, he premiered the play A mi manera de hacer, in which he recreated his most popular numbers. Shortly after the premiere, on February 28 of that same year, the play was taken off the stage due to the actor's personal problems, although he later played a leading role in El oro de Moscú (The Gold of Moscow) and in the film La daga de Rasputín (Rasputin's Dagger), directed by Jesús Bonilla, which was a huge box office success. Andrés Pajares is currently the dean of Spanish comic actors.

== Selected filmography ==
- The Sailor with Golden Fists (1968)
- A Decent Adultery (1969)
- En un mundo nuevo (1972)
- Cristóbal Colón, de oficio... descubridor (1982)
- Moors and Christians (1987)
- ¡Ay Carmela! (1991)
- Makinavaja, el último choriso (1992)
- Bwana (1996)
- Moscow Gold (2003)

== Awards ==
- Won Goya Award for Best Actor 1991: ¡Ay Carmela!
