= Bwana (film) =

1996 film

- Directed by: Imanol Uribe
- Written by: Imanol Uribe
- Starring: Andrés Pajares
- Music by: José Nieto
- Release date: 27 September 1996
- Running time: 90 minutes
- Country: Spain
- Language: Spanish

Bwana is a 1996 Spanish drama film directed by Imanol Uribe. The film was selected as the Spanish entry for the Best Foreign Language Film at the 69th Academy Awards, but was not accepted as a nominee. The plot tracks an African immigrant and a Spanish family treating the former as if he were an alien.

== Cast ==
- Andrés Pajares as Antonio
- María Barranco as Dori
- Emilio Buale as Ombasi
- Alejandro Martínez as Iván
- Andrea Granero as Jessy
- Miguel del Arco as Román
- Paul Berrondo as Michael

== See also ==
- List of submissions to the 69th Academy Awards for Best Foreign Language Film
- List of Spanish submissions for the Academy Award for Best Foreign Language Film
