= Fernando Rey =

Spanish actor (1917–1994)

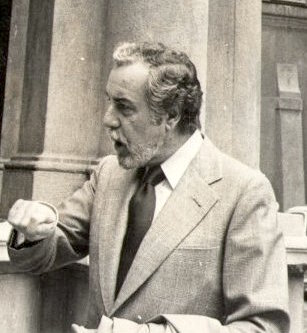
- Rey in 1974
- Born: Fernando Casado Arambillet; 20 September 1917; A Coruña, Galicia, Spain
- Died: 9 March 1994 (aged 76); Madrid, Spain
- Occupation: Actor
- Years active: 1935–1994
- Spouse: Mabel Karr (m. 1960)
- Children: 2
- Awards: Cannes Film Festival Award for Best Actor; 1977 Elisa, vida mía

Fernando Casado Arambillet (20 September 1917 – 9 March 1994), best known as Fernando Rey, was a Spanish actor of film, theatre, and televisionwho worked in both Europe and the United States. Known for his suave image, Rey was best-known for his roles in the films of surrealist director Luis Buñuel (Viridiana, 1961; Tristana, 1970; Discreet Charm of the Bourgeoisie, 1972; That Obscure Object of Desire, 1977) and as the drug lord Alain Charnier in The French Connection (1971) and French Connection II (1975). He appeared in more than 150 films over half a century.

The debonair Rey was described by French Connection producer Philip D'Antoni as "the last of the Continental guys". He achieved his greatest fame after he turned 50: "Perhaps it is a pity that my success came so late in life", he told the Los Angeles Times. "It might have been better to have been successful while young, like El Cordobés in the bullring. Then your life is all before you to enjoy it."

== Biography ==
=== Early life ===
Rey was born in A Coruña, Spain, the son of Fernando Casado Veiga and Sara Arambillet Rey. He studied architecture, but the Spanish Civil War interrupted his university studies. Rey and his father, an army colonel, fought on the side of the Loyalists against the forces of Francisco Franco. His family was wealthy, but by the end of the war they were impoverished. His father was sentenced to death after the war, but the sentence was suspended.

Fernando Rey with Silvia Pinal in Viridiana, in the cover of the film script book.

=== Career in Spain ===
In 1936, Rey began his career in films as an extra, sometimes even getting credited. It was then that he chose his stage name, Fernando Rey. He kept his first name, but took his mother's second surname, Rey, a short surname with a clear meaning ("Rey" is Spanish for "King").

In 1944, his first speaking role was the Duke of Alba in José López Rubio's Eugenia de Montijo. Four years later, he acted the part of Felipe I el Hermoso, King of Spain, in the Spanish cinema blockbuster Locura de amor.

This was the start of a prolific career in film (he played in around two hundred films), radio, theatre, and television. Rey was also a great dubbing actor in Spanish television. His voice was considered intense and personal, and he became the narrator of important Spanish movies including Luis García Berlanga's Bienvenido Mr. Marshall (1953), Ladislao Vajda's Marcelino Pan y Vino (1955), and even the 1992 re-dubbed version of Orson Welles' Don Quixote. In fact, Rey acted in four different film versions of Don Quixote in different roles, if one counts the Welles version (for which Rey supplied offscreen narration in the final scene).

His brilliant performance in the role of a demotivated and doubtful actor in Juan Antonio Bardem's Cómicos (1954), while showing him for the first time in a successful lead part, paradoxically, as he saw himself as the real incarnation of the role, plunged him in a professional depression, of which he did not emerge until his collaboration with Luis Buñuel several years later. However, in the short term, Buñuel's disconcerting public remark on Rey's performance in another of Bardem's film, Sonatas (1959), "I love how this actor plays a corpse", could only increase Rey's apprehensions. Nevertheless, eventually Rey became Buñuel's preferred actor and closest friend.

=== International career ===
Fernando Rey with Gloria Grahame in Tarot (The Magician, 1973).

Rey's first international performance was in The Night Heaven Fell (Les bijoutiers du clair de lune) a 1958 French-Italian film directed by Roger Vadim, where he acted alongside Stephen Boyd, Marina Vlady and Brigitte Bardot. Previously he had played in an American TV series, It happens in Spain, the story of the exploits of a private detective, operating out in Spain, who helps distressed American tourists.

In 1959, Rey co-starred with Steve Reeves and Christine Kaufmann in the Italian sword and sandal film The Last Days of Pompeii.

In 1961 Rey played in a European Western, The Savage Guns, and as the popularity of that genre increased during that decade appeared in some other movies, including the political The Price of Power (1969), the cult classic Compañeros, and two sequels of The Magnificent Seven, namely Return of the Seven (1966) and Guns of the Magnificent Seven (1969).

It was his work with Orson Welles and Luis Buñuel during the 1960s and 1970s that made Rey internationally prominent; becoming the first 'international Spanish actor.' Rey starred in Buñuel's Viridiana (1961), Tristana (1970), The Discreet Charm of the Bourgeoisie (Le charme discret de la bourgeoisie) (1972) (a surreal movie which received the 1972 Academy Award for Best Foreign Language Film) and That Obscure Object of Desire (1977). For Welles, Rey performed in two completed films, Chimes at Midnight (1966) and The Immortal Story (1968).

Rey played memorably the French villain Alain Charnier in William Friedkin's The French Connection (1971). Initially, Friedkin intended to cast Francisco Rabal as Charnier, but could not remember his name after seeing him in Luis Buñuel's Belle de jour; he only knew the person he had in mind was a Spanish actor who had worked with Buñuel. Rey was hired after he flew to New York to be met by a surprised Friedkin. Rey's English and French were not perfect, but Friedkin discovered that Rabal spoke neither of them, and opted to keep Rey, who reprised the role in the less successful sequel, French Connection II (1975).

Along 1970s and 1980s Rey played in many international co-productions, some of his appearances being cameos. These films include Lewis Gilbert's The Adventurers (1970), Mauro Bolognini's Drama of the Rich (1974), Vincente Minnelli's A Matter of Time (1976), Valerio Zurlini's The Desert of the Tartars (1976), Robert Altman's Quintet (1979), J. Lee Thompson's Caboblanco (1980) and Frank Perry's Monsignor (1982). One of Rey's greater successes in these years was Elisa, vida mía, a 1977 Spanish drama film written and directed by Carlos Saura.

On his work in Stuart Rosenberg's Voyage of the Damned (1976), Rey once said: "I played [Cuban] president Brú; a cameo. They paid me a lot of money for less than six hours of shooting, in the Barcelona Stock Exchange building, with James Mason. I got more money than Orson Welles, who played a great role ...".

=== Back in Spain ===
Fernando Rey, as Don Quixote, with Alfredo Landa, as Sancho Panza, in El Quijote de Miguel de Cervantes (1992).

In later years, Rey preferred to work in Spain, with successes as Francisco Regueiro's Padre Nuestro (1985), José Luis Cuerda's El bosque animado (1987) and Jaime de Armiñán's Al otro lado del túnel (1992) as well as his portrayal of Don Quixote, alongside Alfredo Landa as Sancho Panza, in the memorable Manuel Gutiérrez Aragón's El Quijote de Miguel de Cervantes (1992) for Televisión Española.

His last appearance on the screen was in a supporting role in the Spanish black comedy El cianuro ... ¿sólo o con leche? (Cyanide ... pure or with milk?) (1994).

=== Recognition and awards ===
In 1971 Fernando Rey won the best actor award in the San Sebastián International Film Festival, for his performance in Rafael Gil's La duda, based, like Viridiana and Tristana, on a novel by Benito Pérez Galdós.

Another of the successes of Rey-Buñuel's collaboration was That Obscure Object of Desire (1977), nominated for another Academy Award for Best Foreign Language Film. It was also nominated for a Golden Globe in the same category, though the movie failed to win either. Rey's voice had to be dubbed by Michel Piccoli.

In Lina Wertmüller's Academy Award-nominated film, Seven Beauties (1975), Rey played the role of Pedro the anarchist who, as a friend of the protagonist and fellow prisoner Pasqualino Settebellezze, chooses a gruesome suicide, rather than spend another day in a Nazi concentration camp.

Rey won Best Actor award at 1977 Cannes Film Festival for his performance in Elisa, vida mía.

In 1988 he again won the best actor award in the San Sebastián International Film Festival, this time for his performance in two films: Francisco Regueiro's Diario de invierno and Antonio Isasi-Isasmendi's El Aire de un Crimen (The Hint of a Crime).

Fernando Rey was also awarded the gold medal of the Spanish Movie Arts and Sciences Academy.

== Personal life and death ==
In 1960, Rey married Argentine actress Mabel Karr. They had a son, Fernando Casado Campolongo.

In 1992, he became chairman of the Academia de las Artes y las Ciencias Cinematográficas de España succeeding Antonio Giménez-Rico.

He died of bladder cancer in Madrid on 9 March 1994. He was survived by his wife, who died in 2001.

== Selected filmography ==
1. 1935: Fazendo Fitas
2. 1936: Nuestra Natacha
3. 1939: Los cuatro robinsones
4. 1940: Leyenda rota as Extra (uncredited)
5. 1940: El rey que rabió as Extra (uncredited)
6. 1940: La Dolores as Extra (uncredited)
7. 1940: La gitanilla as Extra (uncredited)
8. 1941: ¡A mí no me mire usted! as Viajero (uncredited)
9. 1941: Escuadrilla as Extra (uncredited)
10. 1944: Eugenia de Montijo as Duque de Alba
11. 1945: Thirsty Land
12. 1945: Last Stand in the Philippines as Juan Chamizo
13. 1945: Estaba escrito
14. 1946: White Mission as Carlos
15. 1946: The Prodigal Woman as José
16. 1947: Don Quixote as Sansón Carrasco
17. 1947: The Holy Queen as Infante Alfonso
18. 1947: The Princess of the Ursines as Felipe V
19. 1947: Fuenteovejuna as Frondoso
20. 1948: La próxima vez que vivamos as Óscar Mulden
21. 1948: Madness for Love as Felipe el Hermoso
22. 1948: Mare Nostrum as Ulises / Capitán Ferragut
23. 1948: Si te hubieses casado conmigo as Enrique Marín
24. 1949: Sabela de Cambados as Narrator (voice, uncredited)
25. 1949: Noche de Reyes
26. 1949: Aventuras de Juan Lucas as Juan Lucas
27. 1950: Agustina of Aragon as General Palafox / Pastor Lorenzo
28. 1951: Black Sky as Ángel López Veiga
29. 1951: La trinca del aire (voice)
30. 1951: Our Lady of Fatima as Lorenzo Duarte
31. 1952: Devil's Roundup as Atracador
32. 1952: La laguna negra as Miguel
33. 1953: Les amants de Tolède (voice)
34. 1953: Cabaret as Carlos Jiménez
35. 1953: Welcome Mr. Marshall! as Narrator (voice)
36. 1953: Airport as Fernando
37. 1954: Crimen en el entreacto
38. 1954: The Mayor of Zalamea as The King
39. 1954: Rebellion as Capellán
40. 1954: Comedians as Miguel Solís
41. 1955: Miracle of Marcelino as Narrator / Monk
42. 1955: Tangier Assignment as Inspector
43. 1956: La vida en un bloc (voice, uncredited)
44. 1956: The Adventures of Gil Blas as Capitaine Rolando
45. 1956: Playa prohibida
46. 1956: Don Juan as Don Iñigo
47. 1956: Calle Mayor as Federico Rivas (voice, uncredited)
48. 1956: The Singer from Mexico as Cartoni, l'impresario (uncredited)
49. 1957: Faustina as Valentín
50. 1957: Horas de pánico
51. 1957: Madrugada as Mauricio (voice, uncredited)
52. 1957: Un marido de ida y vuelta as Paco
53. 1957: Las últimas banderas
54. 1957: El andén as Don Enrique
55. 1958: The Night Heaven Fell as Tío (alternate version)
56. 1958: La venganza as Escritor
57. 1958: ¡Viva lo imposible! as Narrator (voice, uncredited)
58. 1959: Parque de Madrid as Don Luis
59. 1959: Sonatas as Capitán Casares
60. 1959: The Last Days of Pompeii as Arbaces, High Priest of Isis
61. 1959: Las dos y media... y veneno as Ramón
62. 1960: Mission in Morocco as Prince Achmed
63. 1960: La rana verde as Narrator (voice)
64. 1960: Culpables as Mario
65. 1960: Vida sin risas
66. 1960: Don Lucio y el hermano pío as Señor Aguilar
67. 1960: The Revolt of the Slaves as Valerio
68. 1961: Teresa as Profesor Héctor De La Barrera
69. 1961: Goliath Against the Giants as Bokan, i usurpario
70. 1961: Viridiana (Directed by Luis Buñuel) as Don Jaime
71. 1961: Fantasmas en la casa as Raimundo Rodríguez de Toledo
72. 1961: Siempre es domingo as Juez Andonelli
73. 1962: My Son, the Hero as Sumo Sacerdote / High Priest
74. 1962: Tierra brutal as Don Hernán
75. 1962: Face of Terror as Dr. Charles Taylor
76. 1962: Rogelia as Máximo García
77. 1963: El valle de las espadas as Ramiro II, Rey de León
78. 1963: The Running Man as Police Official
79. 1963: Shéhérazade
80. 1963: The Ceremony as Sanchez
81. 1964: Backfire as Commissioner of Beirut Harbor
82. 1964: El espontáneo as El Rico Pintor
83. 1964: Los Palomos as Don Alberto
84. 1964: Fin de semana as Entrevistador
85. 1964: La nueva Cenicienta as Juan Echarre
86. 1964: La hora incógnita as Sacerdote
87. 1964: El señor de La Salle as Luis XIV
88. 1964: Dulcinea del Toboso
89. 1965: El Diablo también llora as Ramòn Quiroga
90. 1965: Son of a Gunfighter as Don Pedro Fortuna
91. 1965: Legacy of the Incas as President Castillo
92. 1965: I grandi condottieri as Lo straniero / The Stranger, Angel of the Lord
93. 1965: Two Mafiosi Against Goldfinger as Goldginger
94. 1965: Espionage in Lisbon as Agent of The New World Organization
95. 1965: El marqués (1965) as Ramos, The Publisher
96. 1965: Chimes at Midnight as Worcester
97. 1966: Attack of the Robots as Sir Percy
98. 1966: Zampo y yo as Luis 'Zampo'
99. 1966: El Greco (Directed by Luciano Salce) as Felipe II
100. 1966: Return of the Seven as Priest
101. 1966: Navajo Joe (Directed by Sergio Corbucci) as Reverend Rattigan
102. 1967: The Desperate Ones as Ibram
103. 1967: The Viscount as Marco Demoygne
104. 1967: Run Like a Thief as Colonel Romero
105. 1967: Cervantes (Directed by Vincent Sherman) as Philip II
106. 1967: Love in Flight as Carlos Mª Saldiez
107. 1968: The Immortal Story (Directed by Orson Welles) as Merchant Telling Clay's History (uncredited)
108. 1968: Villa Rides as Fuentes
109. 1969: Guns of the Magnificent Seven as Quintero
110. 1969: Un sudario a la medida as Marco Augusto
111. 1969: The Price of Power (Directed by Tonino Valerii) as Pinkerton
112. 1970: Land Raiders as Priest
113. 1970: The Adventurers (Directed by Lewis Gilbert) as Jaime Xenos
114. 1970: Tristana (Directed by Luis Buñuel) as Don Lope
115. 1970: Aoom
116. 1970: Chicas de club as Padrino Elisa
117. 1970: La collera del vento (Directed by Mario Camus) as Don Antonio
118. 1970: Compañeros (Directed by Sergio Corbucci) as Professor Xantos
119. 1971: Historia de una traición as Luis
120. 1971: Cold Eyes of Fear (Directed by Enzo G. Castellari) as Judge Bedell
121. 1971: A Town Called Bastard (Directed by Robert Parrish) as Old Blind Man
122. 1971: The Light at the Edge of the World (Directed by Kevin Billington) as Captain Moriz
123. 1971: The French Connection (Directed by William Friedkin) as Alain "Frog One" Charnier
124. 1972: This Kind of Love as Giovanna's Father
125. 1972: Antony and Cleopatra as Lepidus
126. 1972: The Two Faces of Fear as Inspector Nardi
127. 1972: White Sister (Directed by Alberto Lattuada) as Jefe Médico
128. 1972: The Doubt as Don Rodrigo, Conde de Albrit
129. 1972: The Discreet Charm of the Bourgeoisie (Directed by Luis Buñuel) as Don Rafael Acosta
130. 1973: Tarot as Arthur
131. 1973: High Crime (Directed by Enzo G. Castellari) as Cafiero
132. 1973: One Way as Mr. David
133. 1973: La Chute d'un corps as M. Nansoit
134. 1973: White Fang (Directed by Lucio Fulci), as Father Oatley
135. 1974: Pena de muerte as Oscar Bataille
136. 1974: ¿... Y el prójimo? as Luis Ignacio
137. 1974: Dites-le avec des fleurs as Jacques Berger
138. 1974: Drama of the Rich (Directed by Mauro Bolognini) as Il Professore Murri
139. 1974: La Femme aux bottes rouges (Directed by Juan Luis Buñuel) as Perrot
140. 1975: Corruzione al palazzo di giustizia (Directed by Marcello Aliprandi) as Judge Vanini
141. 1975: French Connection II (Directed by John Frankenheimer) as Alain "Frog One" Charnier
142. 1975: Seven Beauties (Directed by Lina Wertmüller) as Pedro, The Anarchist Prisoner
143. 1976: Illustrious Corpses (Directed by Francesco Rosi) as Security Minister
144. 1976: Manuela as Don Ramón
145. 1976: A Matter of Time (Directed by Vincente Minnelli) as Charles Van Maar
146. 1976: The Desert of the Tartars (Directed by Valerio Zurlini) as Colonel Nathanson
147. 1976: Voyage of the Damned (Directed by Stuart Rosenberg) as President Bru
148. 1976: Striptease as Alfonso
149. 1976: El segundo poder as Cardenal
150. 1977: Jesus of Nazareth (TV miniseries) (Directed by Franco Zeffirelli) as Gaspar
151. 1977: Elisa, vida mía (Directed by Carlos Saura) as Luis
152. 1977: The Assignment (Directed by Mats Arehn) as Roberto Bidara
153. 1977: Eyes Behind the Wall as Ivano
154. 1977: That Obscure Object of Desire (Directed by Luis Buñuel) as Mathieu
155. 1978: Le Dernier Amant romantique as Max
156. 1978: Rebeldía as Don Luis
157. 1979: Traffic Jam (Directed by Luigi Comencini) as Carlo
158. 1979: Quintet (Directed by Robert Altman) as Grigor
159. 1980: Caboblanco (Directed by J. Lee Thompson), as Police Captain Terredo
160. 1980: The Crime of Cuenca as Contreras
161. 1980: Memorias de Leticia Valle as Don Fernando Valle
162. 1981: The Lady of the Camellias (Directed by Mauro Bolognini) as Count Stackelberg
163. 1981: Honey as Editor
164. 1981: Chaste and Pure (Directed by Salvatore Samperi) as Antonio Di Maggio
165. 1981: Trágala, perro as Juez
166. 1982: Cercasi Gesù as Don Filippo
167. 1982: A Estrangeira as André
168. 1982: Monsignor (Directed by Frank Perry) as Santoni
169. 1983: Bearn o la sala de las muñecas as Don Antonio
170. 1984: The Hit (Directed by Stephen Frears) as Senior Policeman
171. 1984: A Strange Passion as Piacchi
172. 1985: A.D. (Directed by Stuart Cooper) as Seneca
173. 1985: Black Arrow (Directed by John Hough) as Warwick
174. 1985: Padre nuestro as Cardenal
175. 1985: Rustlers' Rhapsody (Directed by Hugh Wilson) as Railroad Colonel
176. 1985: The Knight of the Dragon (Directed by Fernando Colomo) as Fray Lupo
177. 1986: Saving Grace (Directed by Robert M. Young) as Cardinal Stefano Biondi
178. 1986: Elogio della pazzia
179. 1987: Commando Mengele as Ohmei Felsberg
180. 1987: Hôtel du Paradis (Directed by Jana Boková) as Joseph
181. 1987: Mi general as Director Almirante
182. 1987: El bosque animado (Directed by José Luis Cuerda) as Senor D'Abondo
183. 1988: The Tunnel as Allende
184. 1988: Pasodoble as Don Nuño
185. 1988: Moon over Parador (Directed by Paul Mazursky) as Alejandro
186. 1988: Diario de invierno as Padre
187. 1988: El aire de un crimen as Fayón
188. 1989: Esmeralda Bay as Ramos
189. 1990: Naked Tango (Directed by Leonard Schrader) as Juez Torres
190. 1990: Breath of Life (Directed by Beppe Cino) as Gran Magno
191. 1990: La batalla de los Tres Reyes as Papa Pablo V
192. 1992: Don Quixote as Closing Scene Narrator (voice, uncredited)
193. 1992: 1492: Conquest of Paradise (Directed by Ridley Scott) as Marchena
194. 1992: Después del sueño as Ramiro Lanza
195. 1992: La marrana as Fray Juan
196. 1992: L'Atlantide (Directed by Bob Swaim) as Father Mauritius
197. 1993: Madregilda as Padre de Franco
198. 1994: On the Far Side of the Tunnel (Directed by Jaime de Armiñán) as Miguel
199. 1994: El cianuro... ¿solo o con leche? as Gregorio (final film role)

== See also ==
- Cinema of Spain

== Bibliography ==
- Cebollada, Pascual (1992). Fernando Rey. Madrid: C.I.L.E.H. ISBN 84-87411-12-6.
- Torres, Augusto M. (1994). Diccionario del cine español. Madrid: Espasa-Calpe. ISBN 84-239-9203-9.
