= Goya Award for Best Actor =

Annual award by the Spanish Film Academy

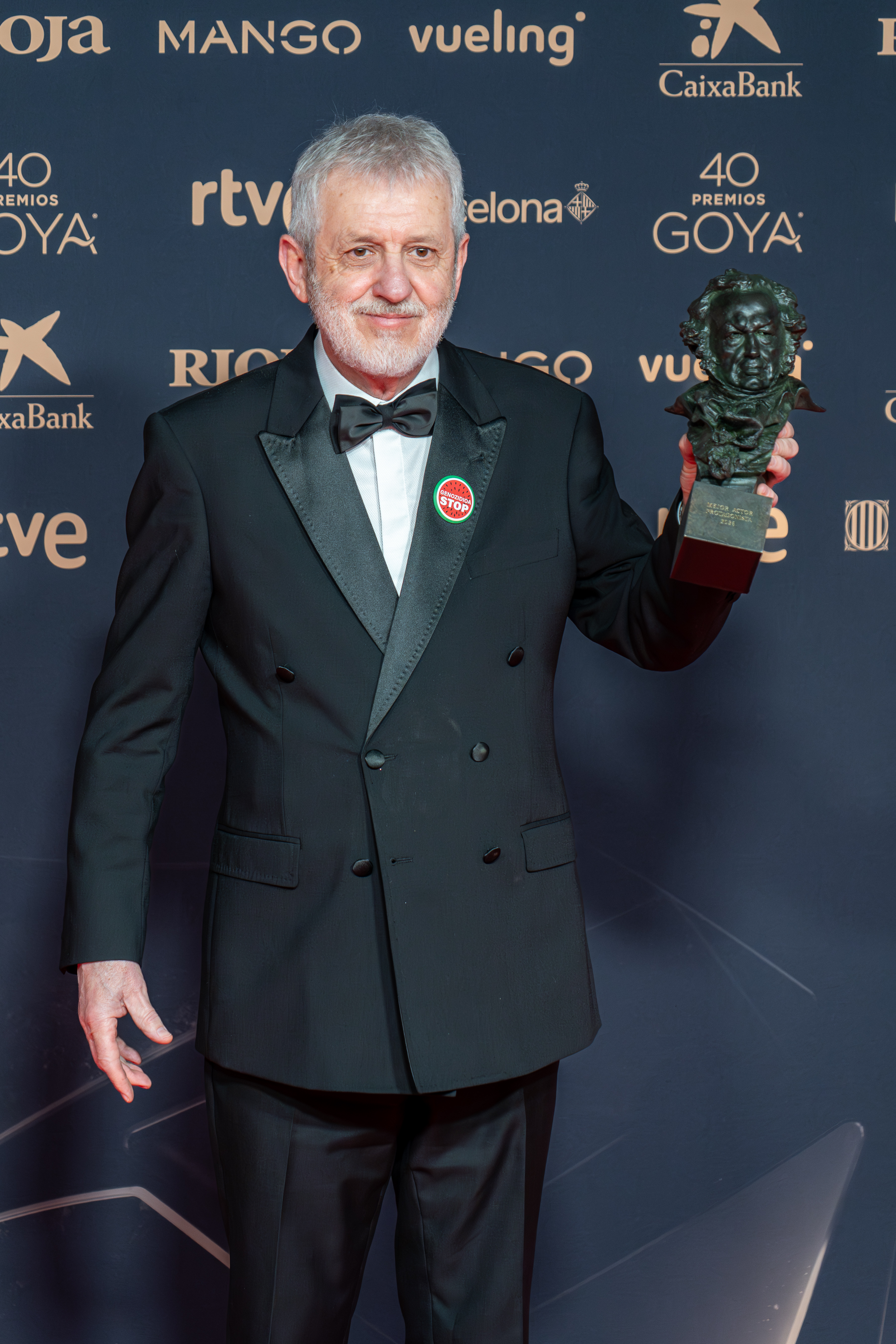
- The 2026 recipient: José Ramón Soroiz
- Native name: Premio Goya a la mejor interpretación masculina protagonista
- Awarded for: Best performance by an actor in a leading role in a Spanish film of the year
- Country: Spain
- Presented by: Academy of Cinematographic Arts and Sciences of Spain (AACCE)
- First award: 1st Goya Awards (1986)
- Most recent winner: José Ramón Soroiz; Maspalomas (2025)
- Website: Official website

The Goya Award for Best Actor (Spanish: Premio Goya a la mejor interpretación masculina protagonista) is one of the Goya Awards presented annually by the Academy of Cinematographic Arts and Sciences of Spain (AACCE) since the awards debuted in 1986. It is given in honor of an actor who has delivered an outstanding leading performance in a Spanish film.

== History ==
At the 1st Goya Awards, Fernando Fernán Gómez was the first winner of this award for his role as Emiliano in Mambru Went to War (Mambrú se fue a la guerra). Javier Bardem holds the record of most wins in the category with five victories. Other multiple winners are Luis Tosar, Eduard Fernández, Alfredo Landa, Fernando Fernán Gómez, and Javier Gutiérrez, all with two victories each. Bardem is also the most nominated actor for the award with ten nominations, followed by Tosar with eight.

Actors that won or were nominated for this category have had a significant presence in several film festivals both Spanish and international: Imanol Arias (Lute: Run for Your Life), Fernando Rey (Winter Diary), Juan Echanove (Madregilda), Luis Tosar (Take My Eyes), Juan José Ballesta (7 Virgins), Juan Diego (Go Away from Me), José Sacristán (The Dead Man and Being Happy), Javier Gutiérrez (Marshland), Ricardo Darín (Truman) and Eduard Fernández (Smoke & Mirrors), all have received the Silver Shell for Best Actor at the San Sebastián International Film Festival. Juan Luis Galiardo (Goodbye from the Heart), Javier Cámara (Torremolinos 73, Chef's Special) and Alberto San Juan (Under the Stars) received the Best Actor award at the Málaga Film Festival. Javier Bardem received the Volpi Cup for Best Actor at the Venice Film Festival for The Sea Inside. Finally, at Cannes, Benicio del Toro (Che I: The Argentine) and Antonio Bandera (Pain and Glory) won Best Actor.

At the 92nd Academy Awards, Banderas was nominated for Best Actor for Pain and Glory (2019).

== Winners and nominees ==
In the list below the winner of the award for each year is shown first, followed by the other nominees.

Table key
‡	Indicates the winner

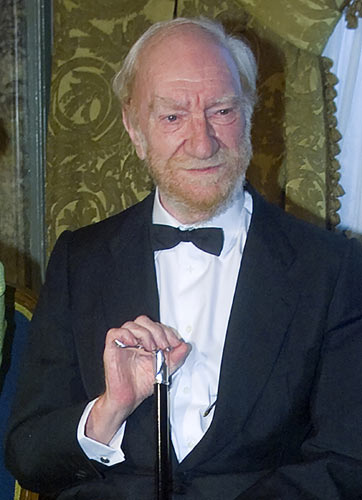
Fernando Fernán Gómez was the first winner of this category for Mambrú Went to War in 1986. He won again for The Grandfather in 1998.

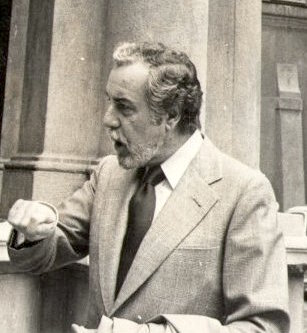
Fernando Rey won for Winter Diary in 1988.

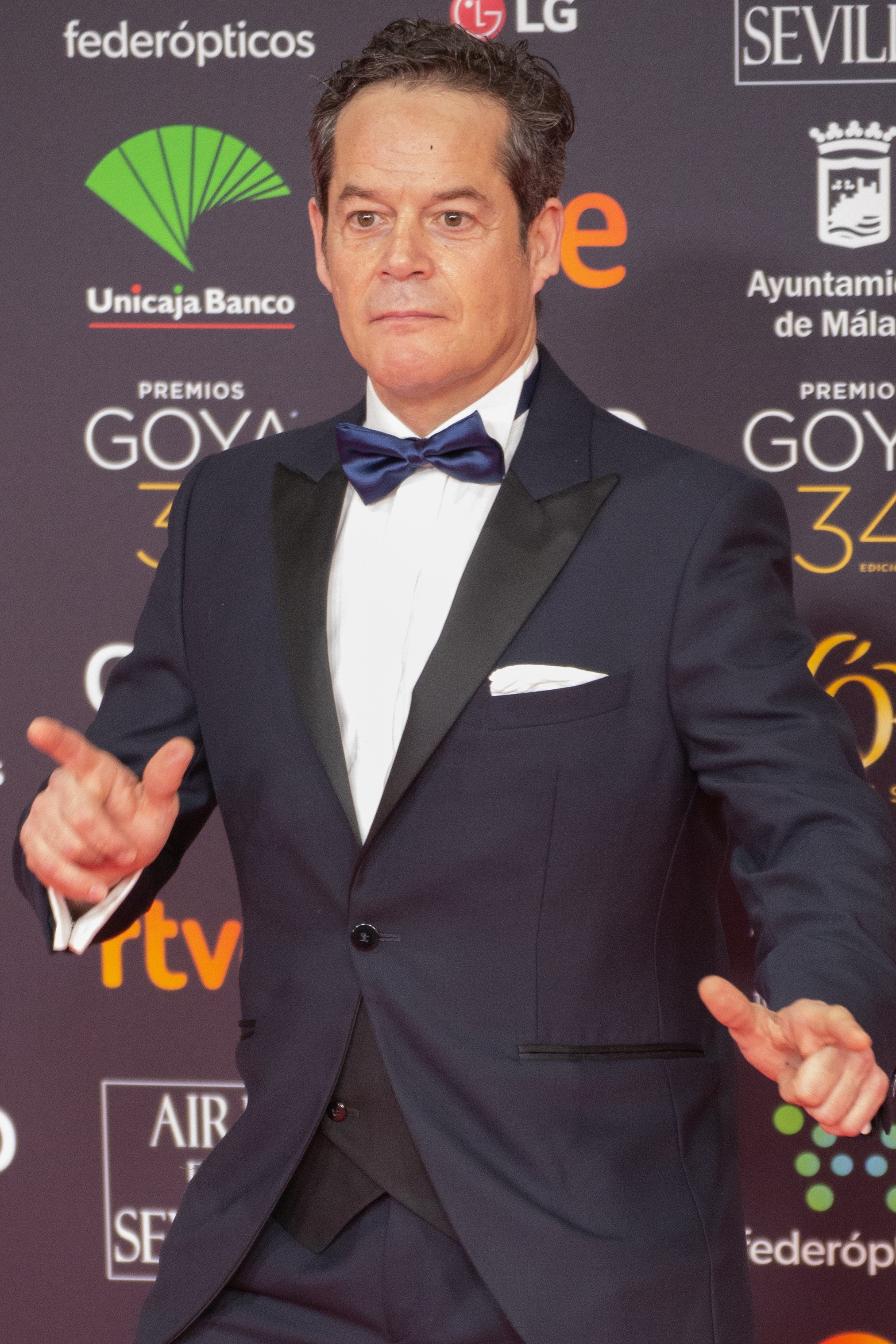
Jorge Sanz won for If They Tell You I Fell in 1989.

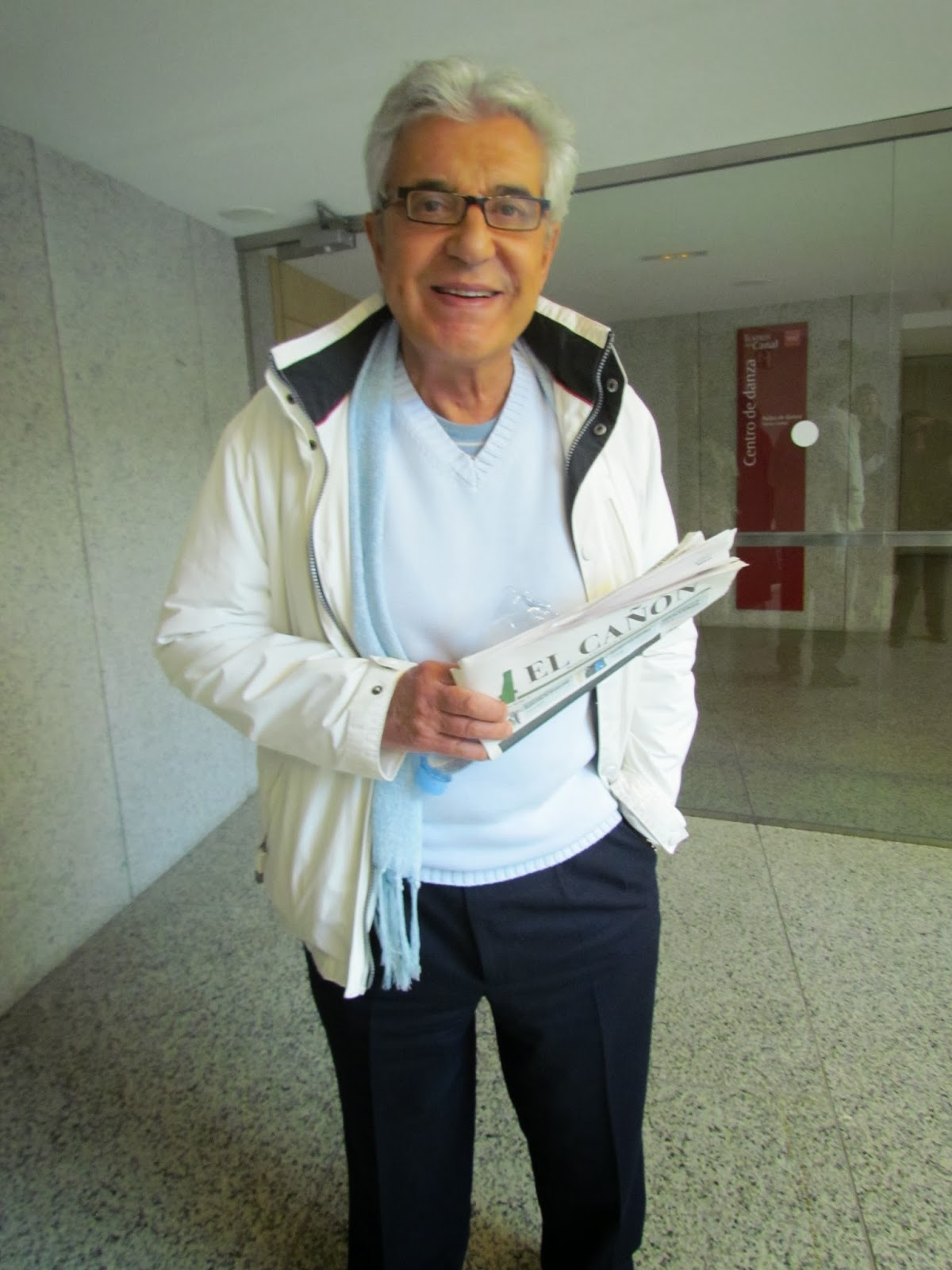
Andrés Pajares won for ¡Ay, Carmela! in 1990.

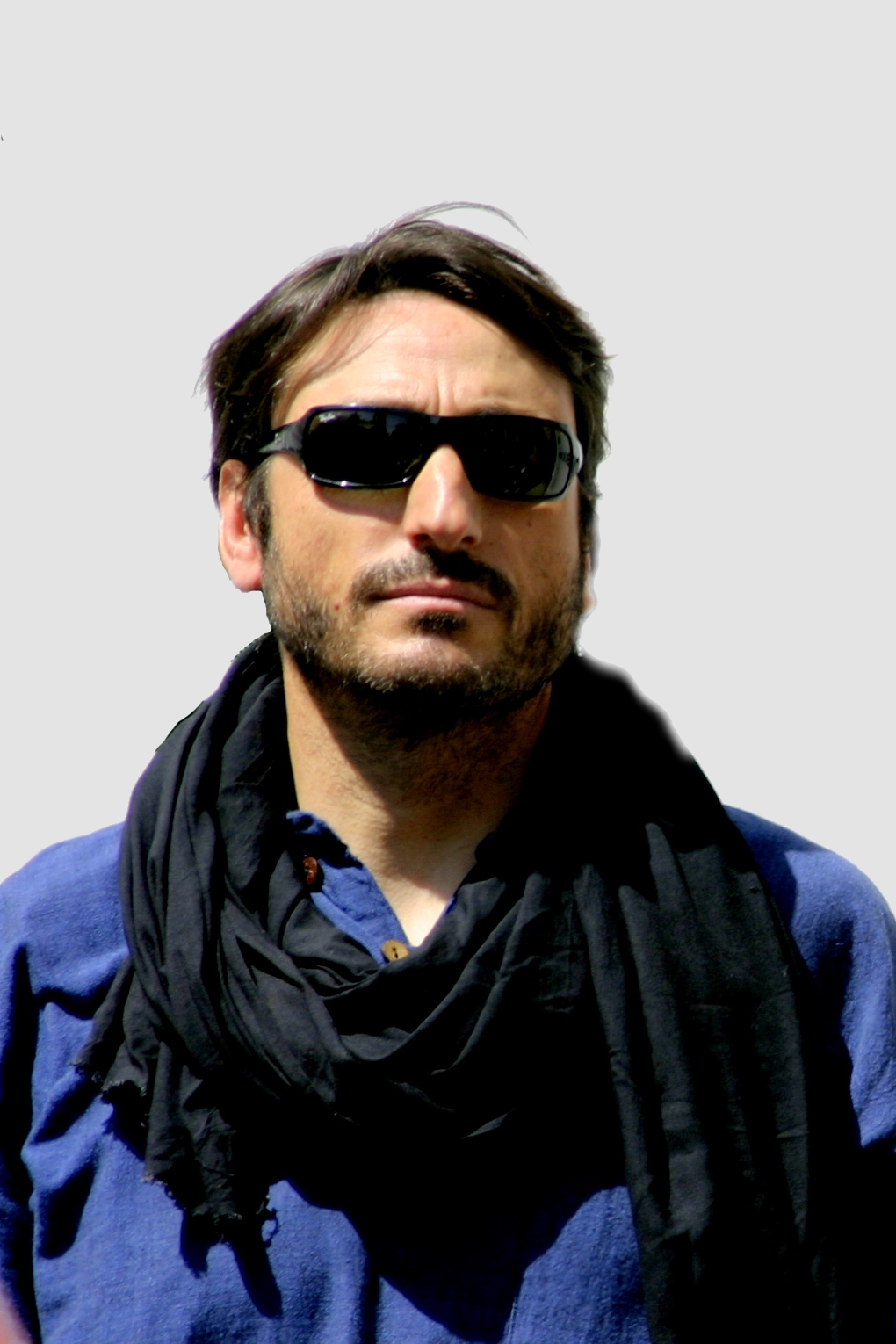
Carmelo Gómez won for Días contados in 1994.

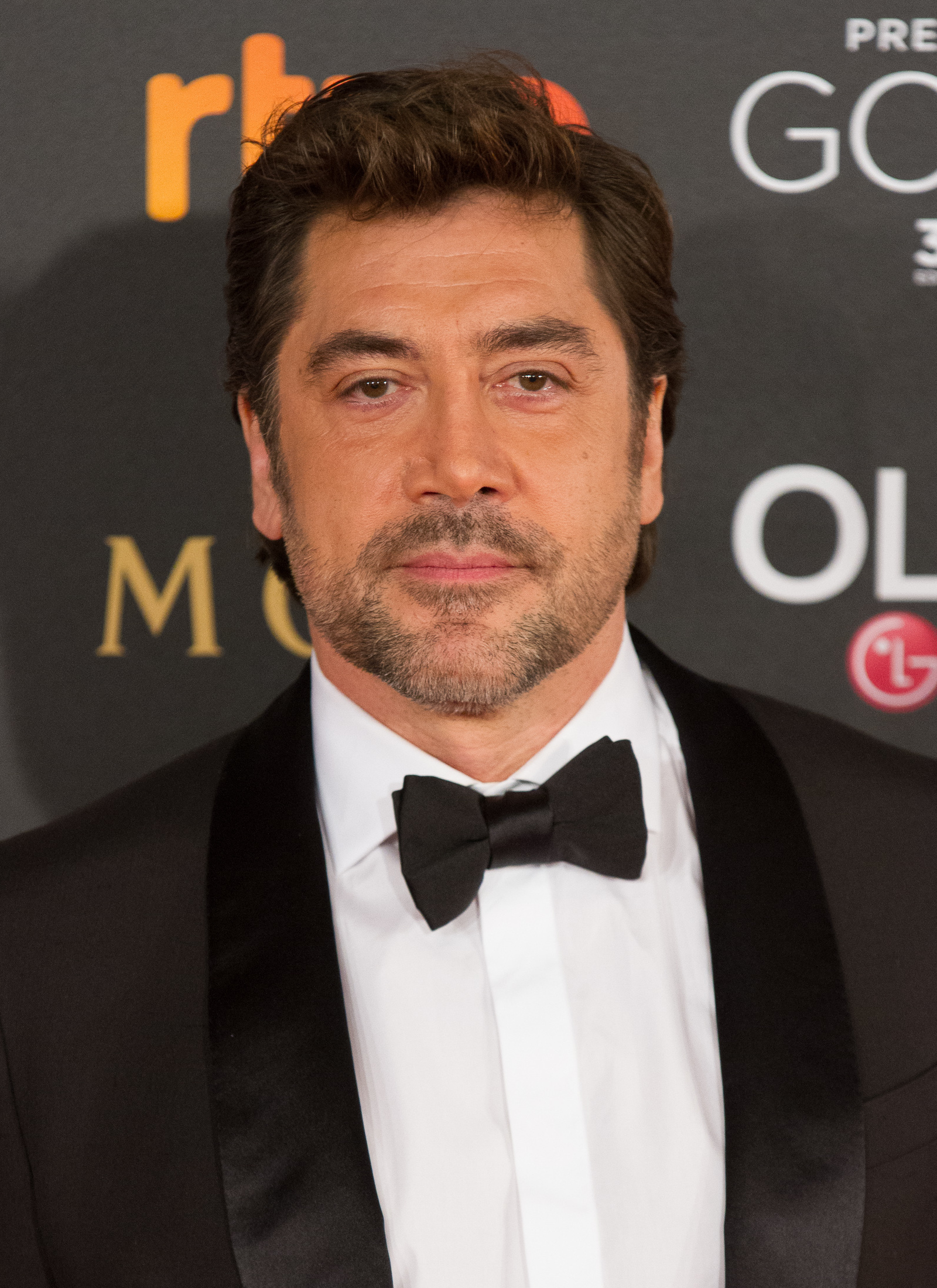
Javier Bardem has won five times, for Mouth to Mouth in 1995, Mondays in the Sun in 2002, The Sea Inside in 2004, Biutiful in 2010 and El buen patrón in 2021.

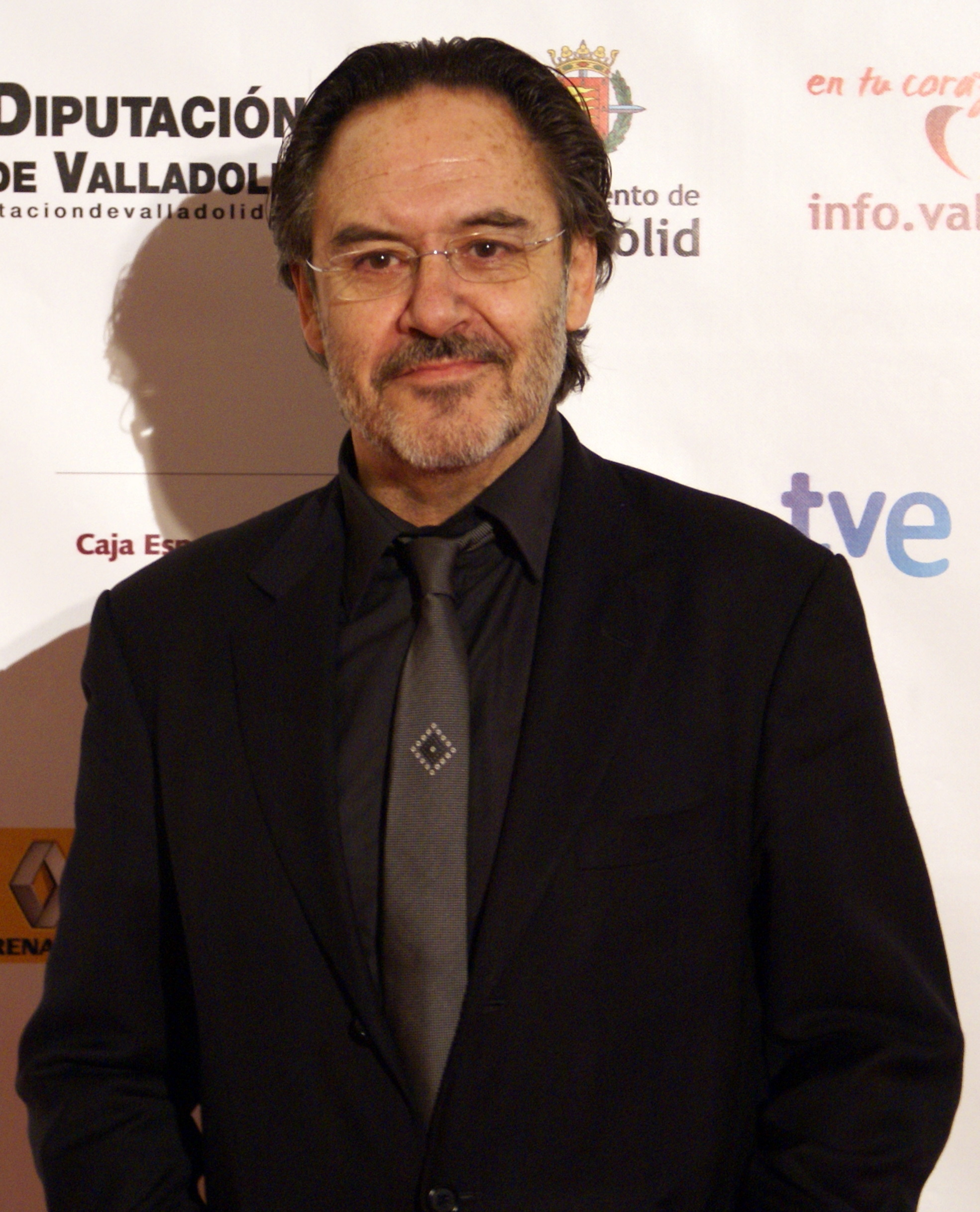
Santiago Ramos won for Como un relámpago in 1996.

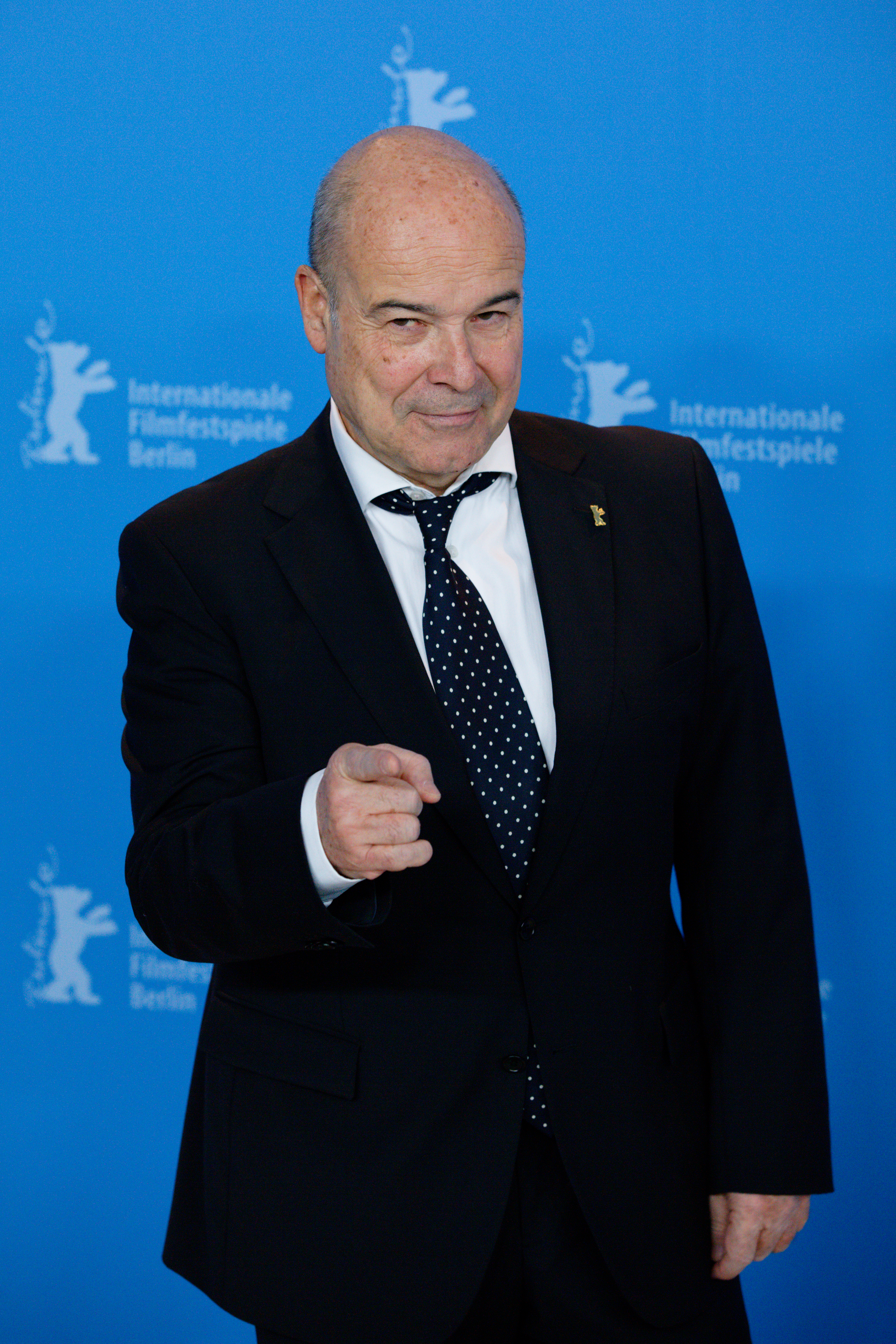
Antonio Resines won for The Lucky Star in 1997.

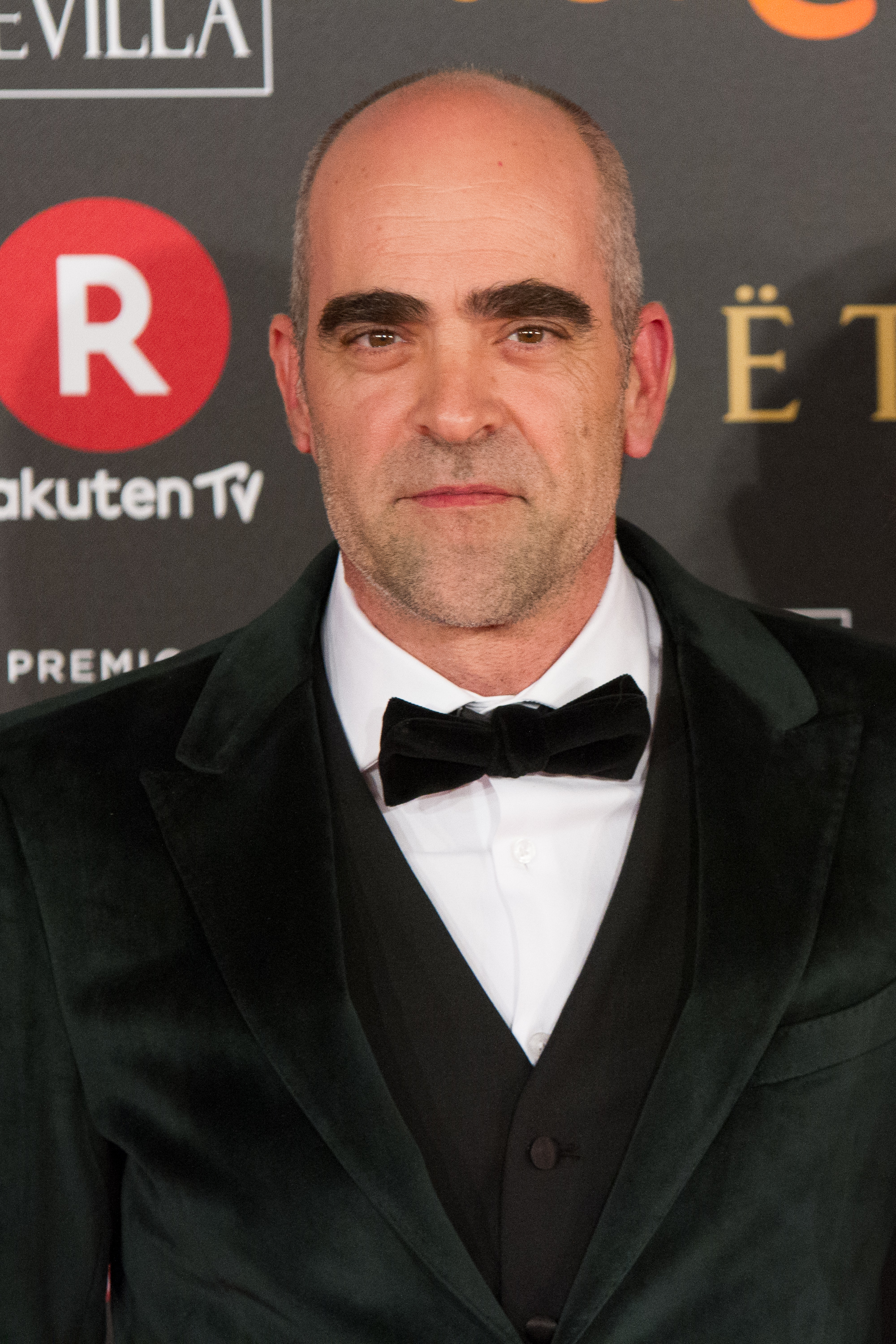
Luis Tosar has won twice, for Take My Eyes in 2003 and Cell 211 in 2009.

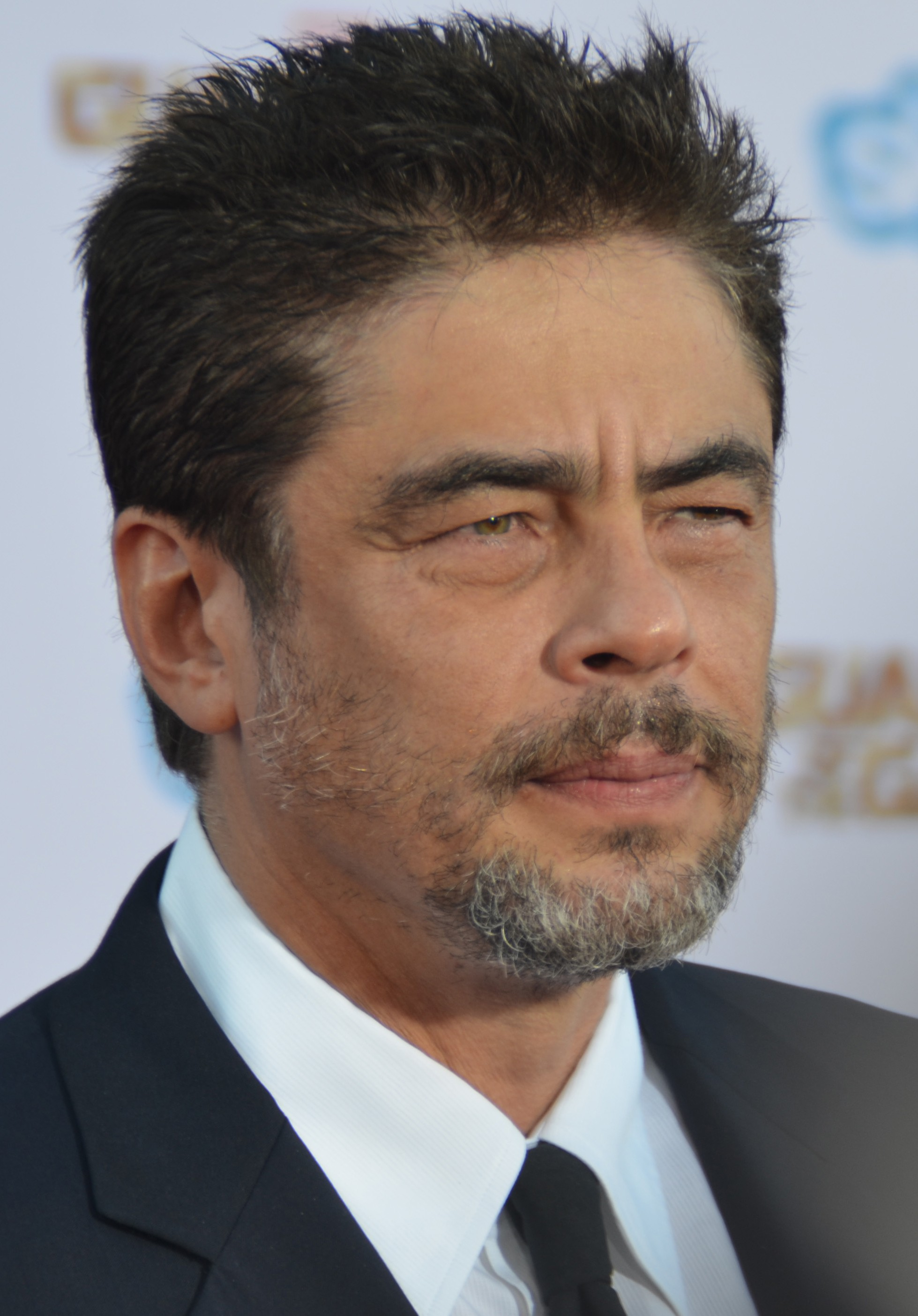
Benicio del Toro won for Che in 2008.

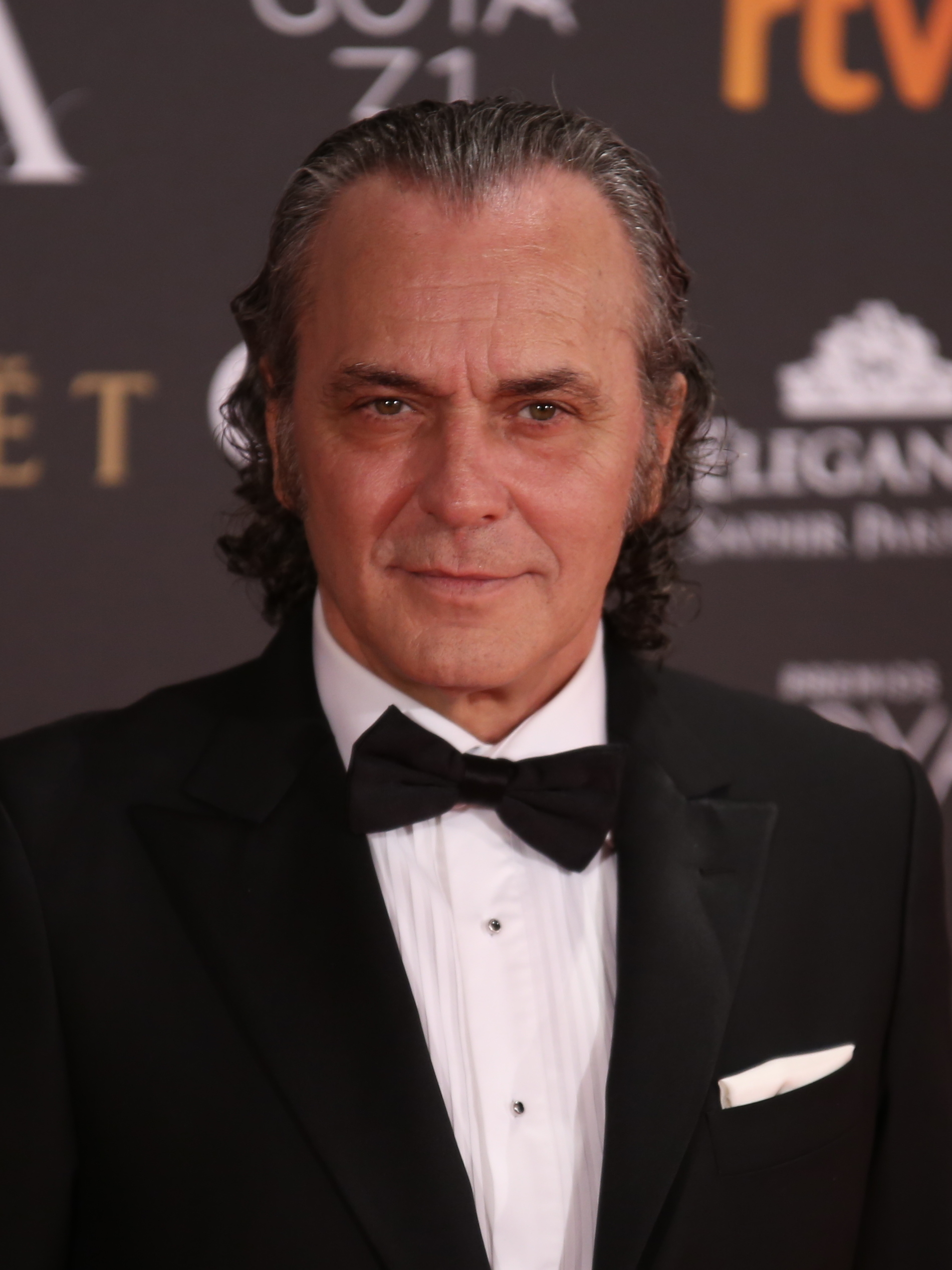
José Coronado won for No Rest for the Wicked in 2011.

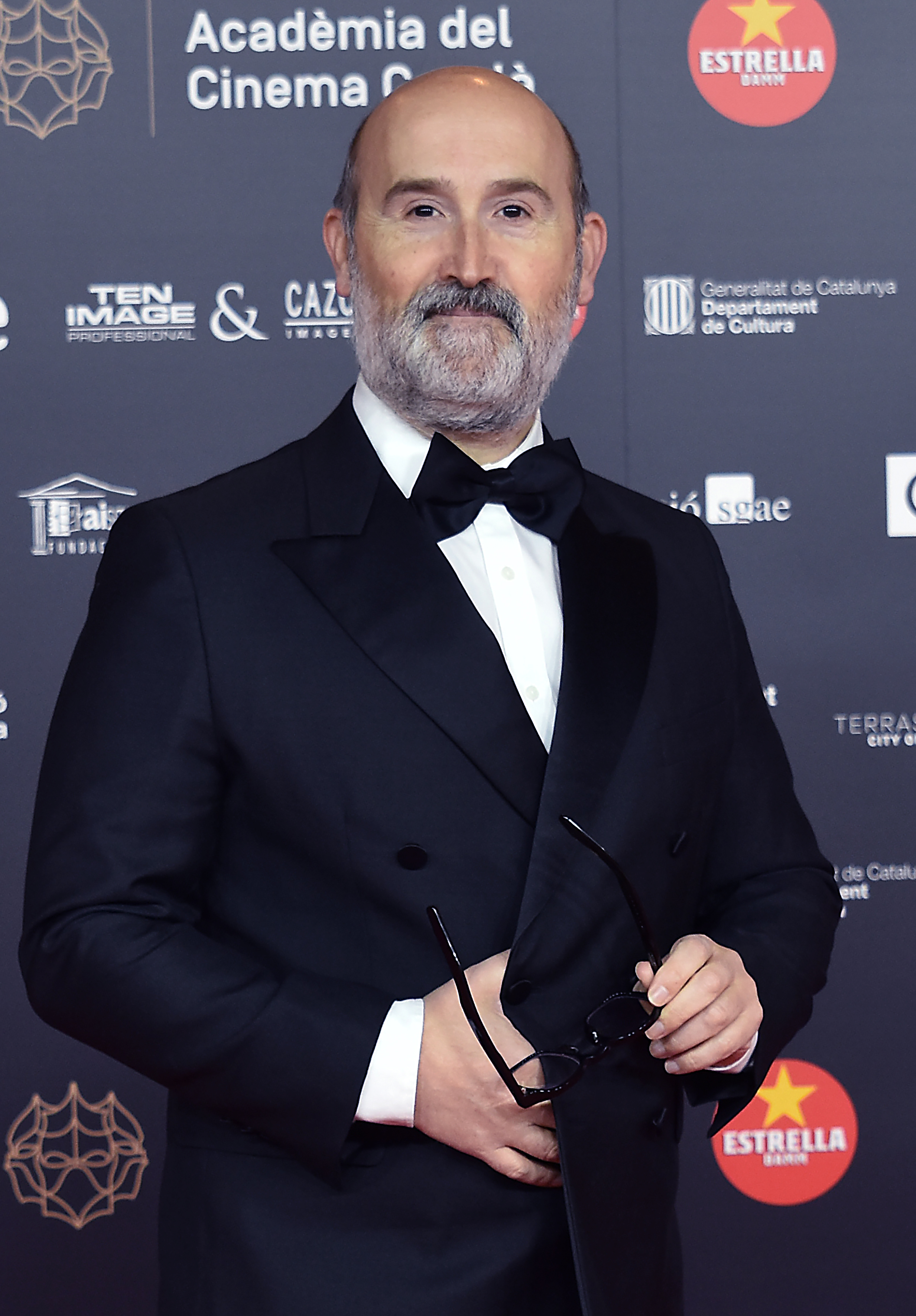
Javier Cámara won for Living Is Easy with Eyes Closed in 2013.

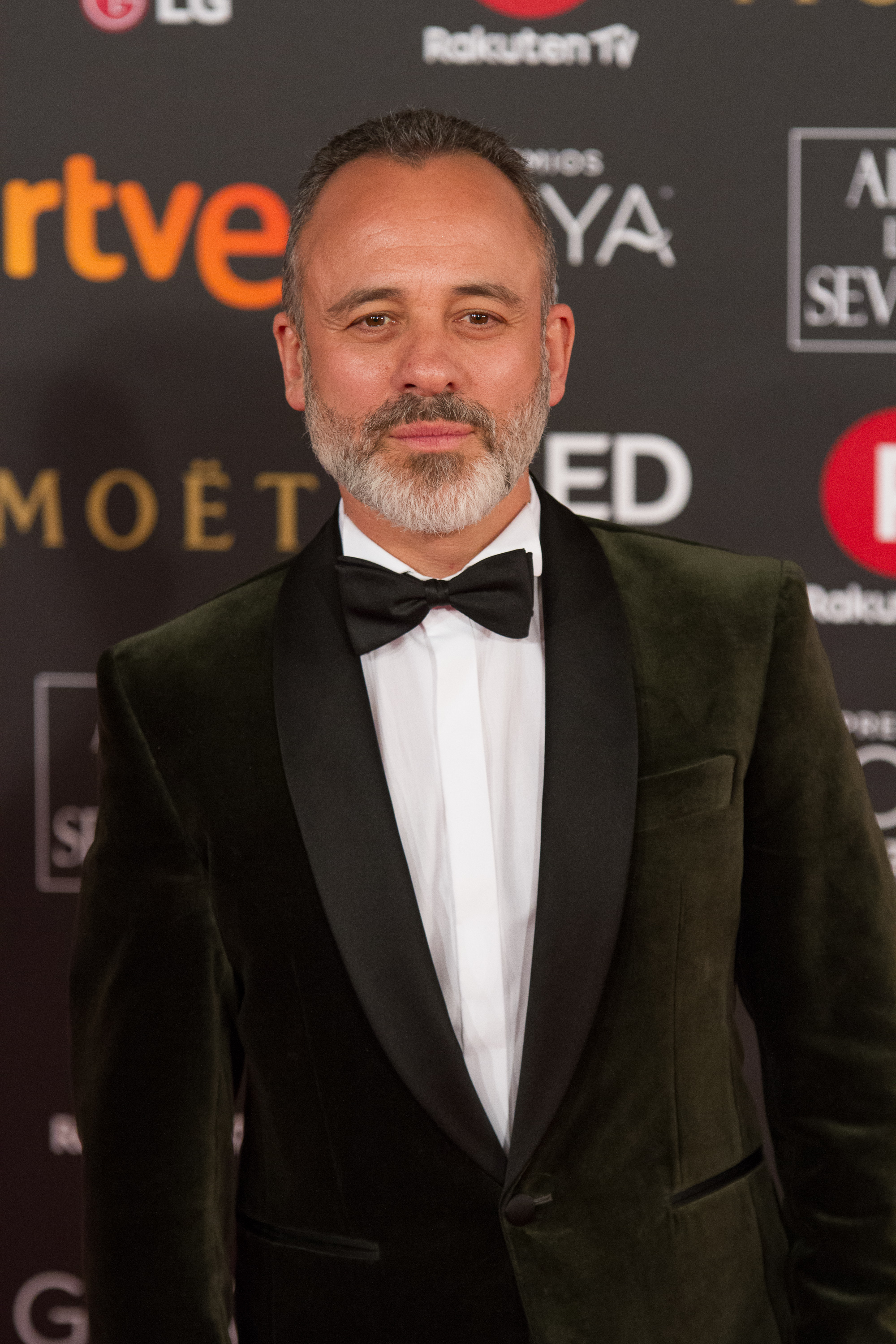
Javier Gutiérrez has won twice, for in Marshland in 2014 and The Motive in 2017.

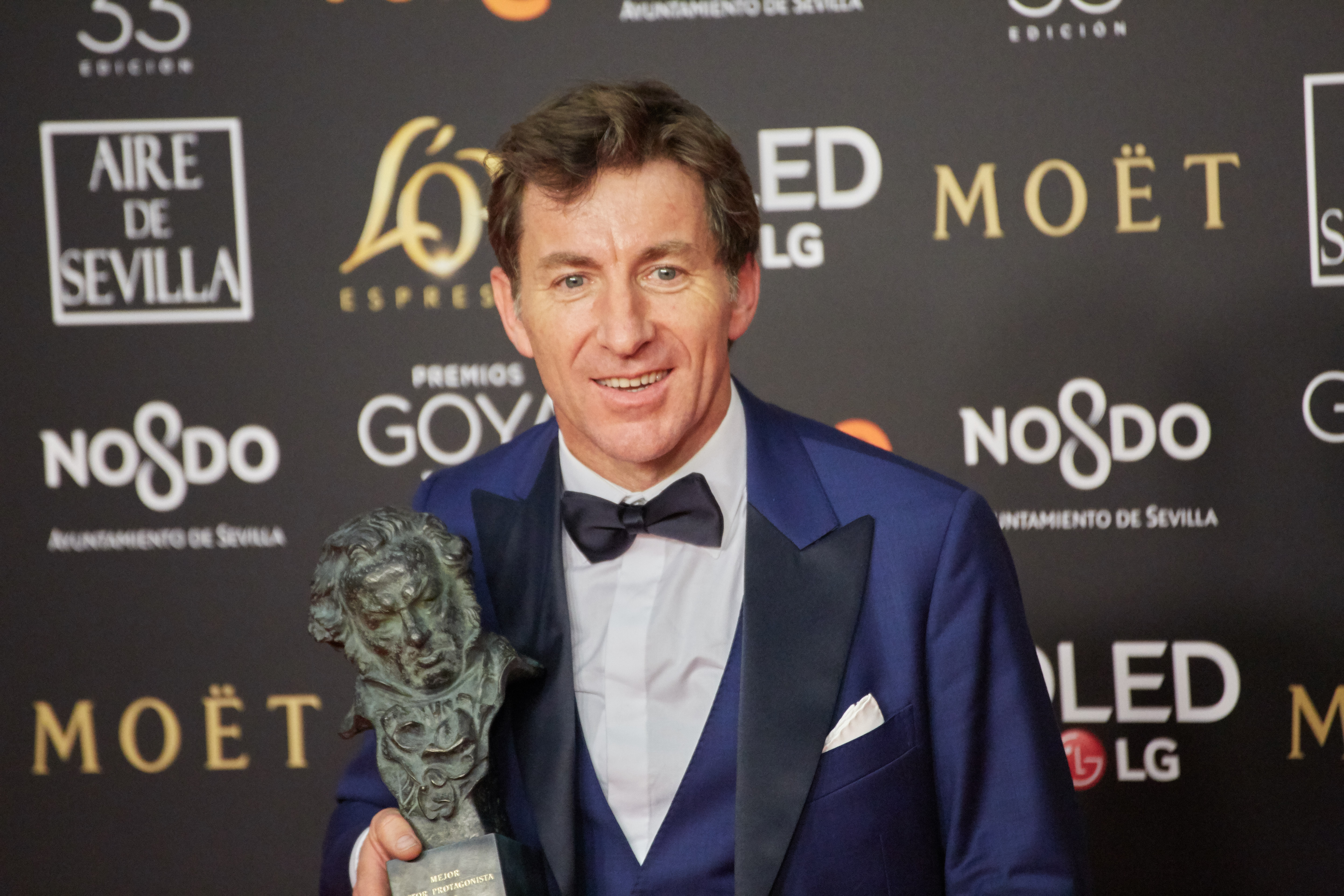
Antonio de la Torre won for The Realm in 2018.

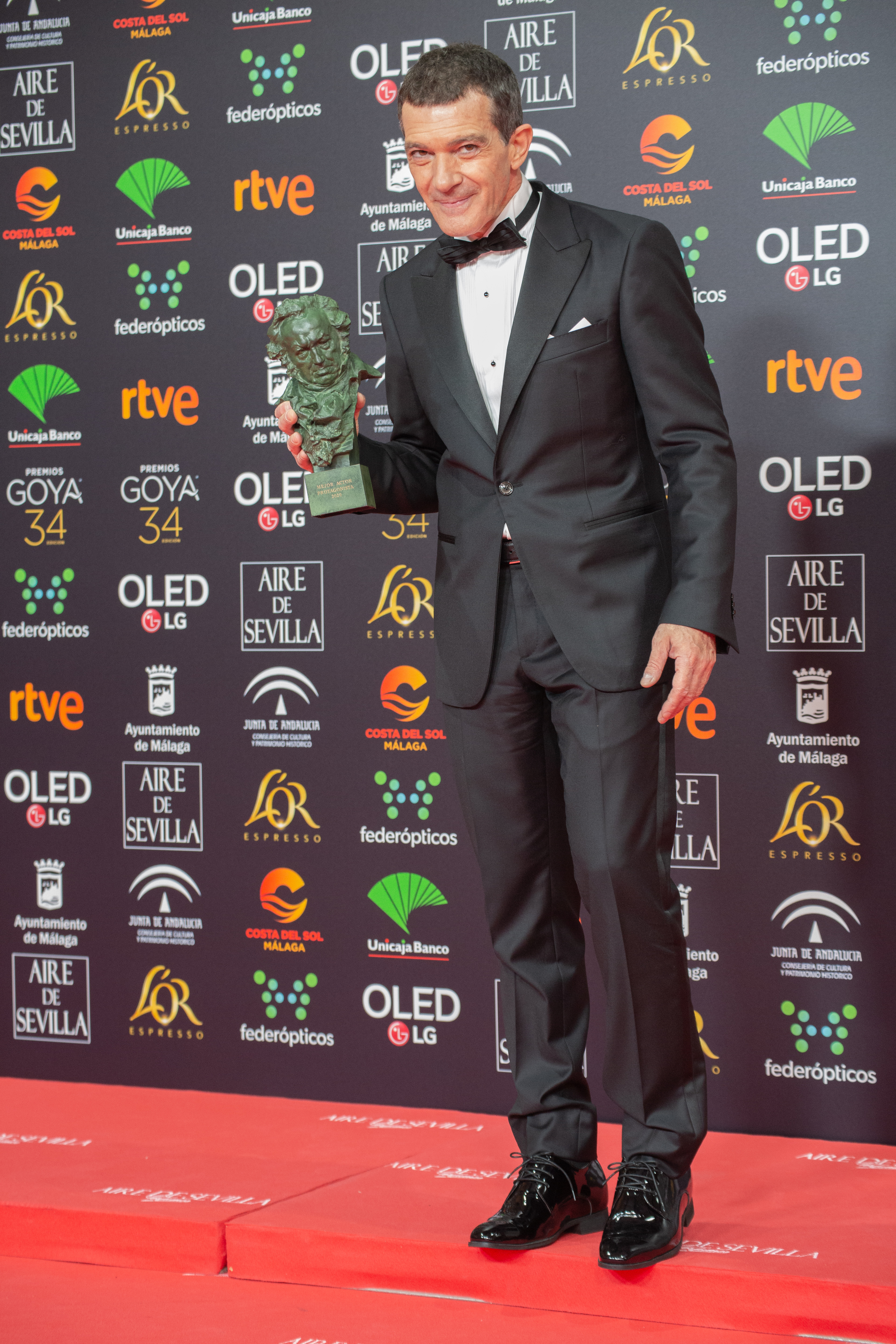
Antonio Banderas won for Pain and Glory in 2019.

=== 1980s ===
Year	Actor	Role(s)	English title	Original title
1986 (1st)	Fernando Fernán Gómez	Emiliano	Mambrú Went to War	Mambrú se fue a la guerra
1986 (1st)	Juan Diego	Francisco Franco	Dragon Rapide	
1986 (1st)	Jorge Sanz	Manolo Morales	The Year of the Awakening	El año de las luces
1987 (2nd)	Alfredo Landa	Malvís / Bandid Fendetestas	The Living Forest	El bosque animado
1987 (2nd)	Imanol Arias	Eleuterio Sánchez "El Lute"	Lute: Run for Your Life	El Lute: Camina o revienta
1987 (2nd)	José Manuel Cervino	Angelito Delicado	The War of the Madmen	La guerra de los locos
1988 (3rd)	Fernando Rey	Padre	Winter Diary	Diario de invierno
1988 (3rd)	Imanol Arias	Eleuterio Sánchez "El Lute"	Lute II: Tomorrow I'll be Free	El Lute II: Mañana seré libre
1988 (3rd)	Antonio Ferrandis	Pedro Luis Jarrapellejos	Jarrapellejos	
1988 (3rd)	Alfredo Landa	Antonio Castro "Sinatra"	Sinatra	
1988 (3rd)	Pepe Soriano	Paulino Alonso / Sosias	Wait for Me in Heaven	Espérame en el cielo
1989 (4th)	Jorge Sanz	Daniel Javaloyes "Java"	If They Tell You I Fell	Si te dicen que caí
1989 (4th)	Fernando Fernán Gómez	Marquess of Esquilache	Esquilache	
1989 (4th)	Fernando Fernán Gómez	Eusebio	The Sea and the Weather	El mar y el tiempo
1989 (4th)	Juan Diego	Saint John of the Cross	The Dark Night	La noche oscura
1989 (4th)	Alfredo Landa	El Americano	El río que nos lleva	

=== 1990s ===
Year	Actor	Role(s)	English title	Original title
1990 (5th)	Andrés Pajares	Paulino	¡Ay, Carmela!	
1990 (5th)	Imanol Arias	Javier	Alone Together	A solas conmigo
1990 (5th)	Antonio Banderas	Ricky	Tie Me Up! Tie Me Down!	¡Átame!
1991 (6th)	Fernando Guillén	Don Juan	Don Juan in Hell	Don Juan en los infiernos
1991 (6th)	Gabino Diego	Philip IV of Spain	The Dumbfounded King	El rey pasmado
1991 (6th)	Jorge Sanz	Paco	Lovers	Amantes
1992 (7th)	Alfredo Landa	Bartolomé	The Sow	La marrana
1992 (7th)	Javier Bardem	Raúl Gonzales	Jamón Jamón	
1992 (7th)	Jorge Sanz	Fernando	Belle Époque	
1993 (8th)	Juan Echanove	Francisco Franco	Madregilda	
1993 (8th)	Imanol Arias	Ángel	Intruder	Intruso
1993 (8th)	Javier Bardem	Benito González	Golden Balls	Huevos de oro
1994 (9th)	Carmelo Gómez	Antonio	Running Out of Time	Días contados
1994 (9th)	Gabino Diego	Alberto	The Worst Years of Our Lives	Los peores años de nuestra vida
1994 (9th)	Alfredo Landa	Don José	Cradle Song	Canción de cuna
1995 (10th)	Javier Bardem	Víctor Ventura	Mouth to Mouth	Boca a boca
1995 (10th)	Álex Angulo	Father Ángel Berriartúa	The Day of the Beast	El día de las bestia
1995 (10th)	Federico Luppi	Eduardo Guzmán	Nobody Will Speak of Us When We're Dead	Nadie hablará de nosotras cuanda hayamos muerto
1996 (11th)	Santiago Ramos	Rafael Torres	Como un relámpago	
1996 (11th)	Antonio Banderas	Art Dodge	Two Much	Two Much
1996 (11th)	Carmelo Gómez	Teodoro	The Dog in the Manger	El perro del hortelano
1997 (12th)	Antonio Resines	Rafael	The Lucky Star	La buena estrella
1997 (12th)	Javier Bardem	David	Live Flesh	Carne trémula
1997 (12th)	Jordi Mollà	Daniel	The Llucky Star	La buena estrella
1998 (13th)	Fernando Fernán Gómez	Don Rodrigo, Count of Albrit	The Grandfather	El abuelo
1998 (13th)	Gabino Diego	Manuel Martínez	A Time for Defiance	La hora de los valientes
1998 (13th)	Eduardo Noriega	César	Open Your Eyes	Abre los ojos
1998 (13th)	Antonio Resines	Blas Fontiveros	The Girl of Your Dreams	La niña de tus ojos
1999 (14th)	Francisco Rabal	Francisco de Goya	Goya in Bordeaux	Goya en Burdeos
1999 (14th)	Fernando Fernán Gómez	Don Gregorio	Butterfly's Tongue	La lengua de las mariposas
1999 (14th)	Jordi Mollà	Alberto	Second Skin	Segunda piel
1999 (14th)	Josep Maria Pou	Jaume	Beloved/Friend	Amic/Amat (Amigo/Amado)

=== 2000s ===
Year	Actor	Role(s)	English title	Original title
2000 (15th)	Juan Luis Galiardo	Juan Peñasco	Goodbye from the Heart	Adiós con el corazón
2000 (15th)	Juan Diego Botto	The murderer	Plenilune	Plenilunio
2000 (15th)	Carmelo Gómez	Ramiro Forteza	The Goalkeeper	El Portero
2000 (15th)	Miguel Ángel Solá	Mario	I Know Who You Are	Sé quién eres
2001 (16th)	Eduard Fernández	Santos	Fausto 5.0	
2001 (16th)	Sergi López	Joaquín	Mine Alone	Sólo mía
2001 (16th)	Eusebio Poncela	Federico	Intacto	
2001 (16th)	Tristán Ulloa	Lorenzo	Sex and Lucia	Lucía y el sexo
2002 (17th)	Javier Bardem	Santa	Mondays in the Sun	Los lunes al sol
2002 (17th)	Javier Cámara	Benigno Martín	Talk to Her	Hable con ella
2002 (17th)	Juan Luis Galiardo	Don Quixote	Don Quixote, Knight Errant	El caballero Don Quijote
2002 (17th)	Sancho Gracia	Julián Torralba	800 Bullets	800 balas
2003 (18th)	Luis Tosar	Antonio	Take My Eyes	Te doy mis ojos
2003 (18th)	Ernesto Alterio	Antonio	Football Days	Días de fútbol
2003 (18th)	Javier Cámara	Alfredo López	Torremolinos 73	
2003 (18th)	Alfredo Landa	Joaquín Panjero	The End of a Mystery	La luz prodigiosa
2004 (19th)	Javier Bardem	Ramón Sampedro	The Sea Inside	Mar adentro
2004 (19th)	Eduard Fernández	Jorge	Things That Make Living Worthwhile	Cosas que hacen que la vida valga la pena
2004 (19th)	Eduardo Noriega	Mikel Lejarza "El Lobo"	The Wolf	El lobo
2004 (19th)	Guillermo Toledo	Rafael	Crimen Ferpecto	
2005 (20th)	Óscar Jaenada	Camarón de la Isla	Camarón: When Flamenco Became Legend	Camarón
2005 (20th)	Manuel Alexandre	Alfredo	Elsa & Fred	Elsa y Fred
2005 (20th)	Juan José Ballesta	Tano	7 Virgins	7 vírgenes
2005 (20th)	Eduard Fernández	Fernando	The Method	El método
2006 (21st)	Juan Diego	Santiago Pedreño	Go Away from Me	Vete de mí
2006 (21st)	Daniel Brühl	Salvador Puig Antich	Salvador (Puig Antich)	
2006 (21st)	Sergi López	Capitán Vidal	Pan's Labyrinth	El laberinto del fauno
2006 (21st)	Viggo Mortensen	Diego Alatriste	Alatriste	
2007 (22nd)	Alberto San Juan	Benito Lacunza	Under the Stars	Bajo las estrellas
2007 (22nd)	Alfredo Landa	Joaco	Sunday Light	Luz de domingo
2007 (22nd)	Álvaro de Luna	Alfonso	The Field of Stars	El prado de las estrellas
2007 (22nd)	Tristán Ulloa	Iñaki	Mataharis	
2008 (23rd)	Benicio del Toro	Che Guevara	Che I: The Argentine	Che, el argentino
2008 (23rd)	Raúl Arévalo	Salvador	The Blind Sunflowers	Los girasoles ciegos
2008 (23rd)	Javier Cámara	Maxi Alonso	Chef's Special	Fuera de carta
2008 (23rd)	Diego Luna	Gabriel	Just Walking	Sólo quiero caminar
2009 (24th)	Luis Tosar	Malamadre	Cell 211	Celda 211
2009 (24th)	Ricardo Darín	Benjamín Espósito	The Secret in Their Eyes	El secreto de sus ojos
2009 (24th)	Jordi Mollà	Jaime Gil de Biedma	The Consul of Sodom	El cónsul de Sodoma
2009 (24th)	Antonio de la Torre	Enrique	Fat People	Gordos

=== 2010s ===
Year	Actor	Role(s)	English title	Original title
2010 (25th)	Javier Bardem	Uxbal	Biutiful	
2010 (25th)	Antonio de la Torre	Sergio	The Last Circus	Balada triste de trompeta
2010 (25th)	Ryan Reynolds	Paul Conroy	Buried	Buried (Enterrado)
2010 (25th)	Luis Tosar	Costa	Even the Rain	También la lluvia
2011 (26th)	José Coronado	Santos Trinidad	No Rest for the Wicked	No habrá paz para los malvados
2011 (26th)	Antonio Banderas	Robert Ledgard	The Skin I Live In	La piel que habito
2011 (26th)	Daniel Brühl	Álex	Eva	
2011 (26th)	Luis Tosar	César	Sleep Tight	Mientras duermes
2012 (27th)	José Sacristán	Santos	The Dead Man and Being Happy	El muerto y ser feliz
2012 (27th)	Daniel Giménez Cacho	Antonio Villalta	Blancanieves	
2012 (27th)	Jean Rochefort	Marc Cros	The Artist and the Model	El artista y la modelo
2012 (27th)	Antonio de la Torre	Rafael Cantera Luján	Unit 7	Grupo 7
2013 (28th)	Javier Cámara	Antonio San Román	Living Is Easy with Eyes Closed	Vivir es fácil con los ojos cerrados
2013 (28th)	Tito Valverde	Max Aguirre	15 Years and One Day	15 años y un día
2013 (28th)	Antonio de la Torre	Carlos	Cannibal	Caníbal
2013 (28th)	Eduard Fernández	Nacho	All the Women	Todas las mujeres
2014 (29th)	Javier Gutiérrez	Juan Robles	Marshland	La isla mínima
2014 (29th)	Ricardo Darín	Simón Fischer	Wild Tales	Relatos salvajes
2014 (29th)	Raúl Arévalo	Pedro Suárez	Marshland	La isla mínima
2014 (29th)	Luis Bermejo	Luis	Magical Girl	
2015 (30th)	Ricardo Darín	Julián	Truman	
2015 (30th)	Pedro Casablanc	Luis Bárcenas	B	
2015 (30th)	Luis Tosar	Carlos	Retribution	El desconocido
2015 (30th)	Asier Etxeandia	The Groom	The Bride	La novia
2016 (31st)	Roberto Álamo	Javier Alfaro	May God Save Us	Que Dios nos perdone
2016 (31st)	Luis Callejo	Curro	The Fury of a Patient Man	Tarde para la ira
2016 (31st)	Antonio de la Torre	José	The Fury of a Patient Man	Tarde para la ira
2016 (31st)	Eduard Fernández	Francisco Paesa	Smoke & Mirrors	El hombre de las mil caras
2017 (32nd)	Javier Gutiérrez	Álvaro Martín	The Motive	El autor
2017 (32nd)	Andrés Gertrúdix	Luis	Dying	Morir
2017 (32nd)	Javier Bardem	Pablo Escobar	Loving Pablo	
2017 (32nd)	Antonio de la Torre	Carlos López	Abracadabra	
2018 (33rd)	Antonio de la Torre	Manuel López-Vidal	The Realm	El reino
2018 (33rd)	Javier Gutiérrez	Marco Montes	Champions	Campeones
2018 (33rd)	Javier Bardem	Paco	Everybody Knows	Todos lo saben
2018 (33rd)	José Coronado	Jaime Jiménez	Your Son	Tu hijo
2019 (34th)	Antonio Banderas	Salvador Mallo	Pain and Glory	Dolor y gloria
2019 (34th)	Antonio de la Torre	Higinio Blanco	The Endless Trench	La trinchera infinita
2019 (34th)	Karra Elejalde	Miguel de Unamuno	While at War	Mientras dure la guerra
2019 (34th)	Luis Tosar	Mario Vilas	Eye for an Eye	Quien a hierro mata

=== 2020s ===
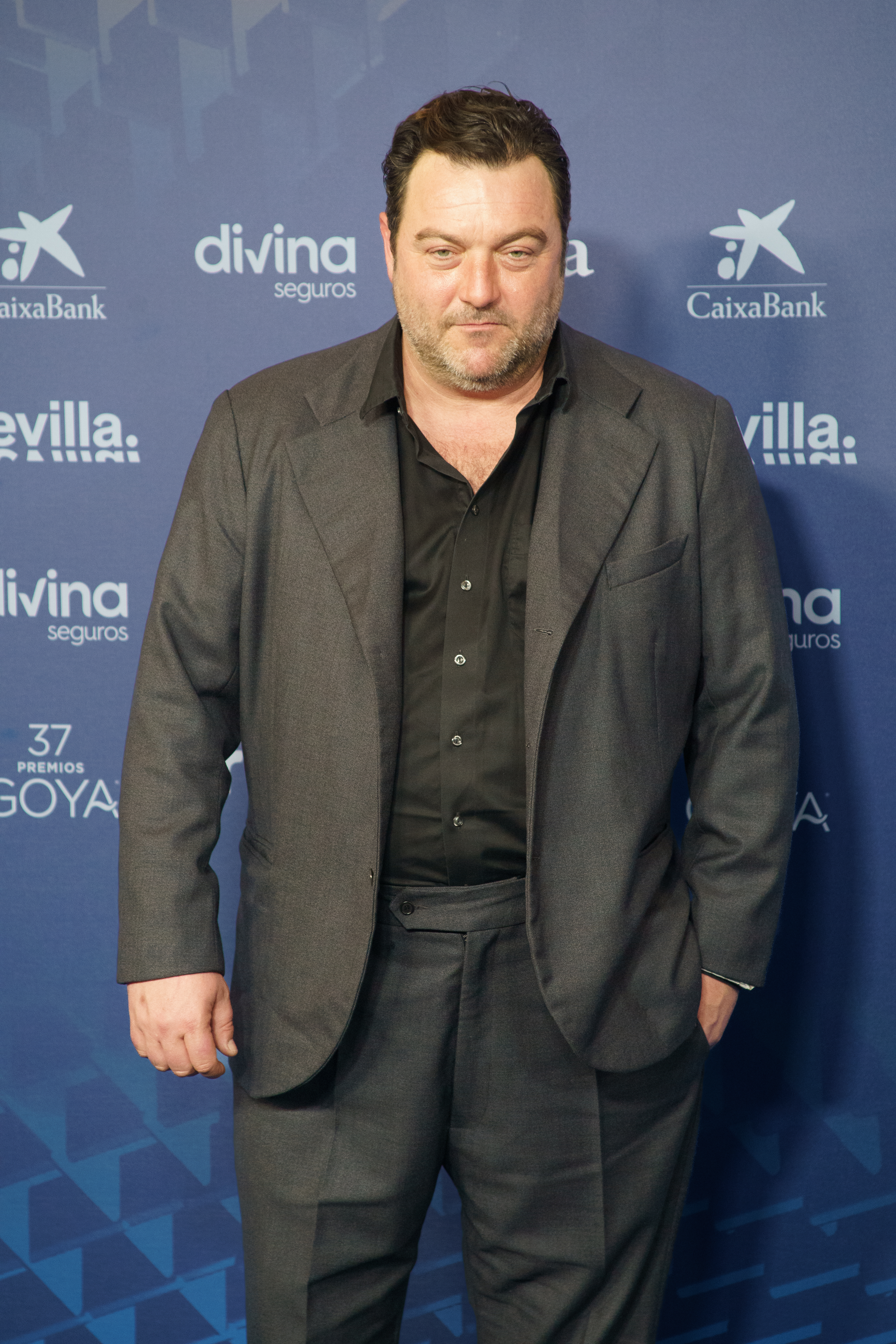
Denis Ménochet won for The Beasts (2022).

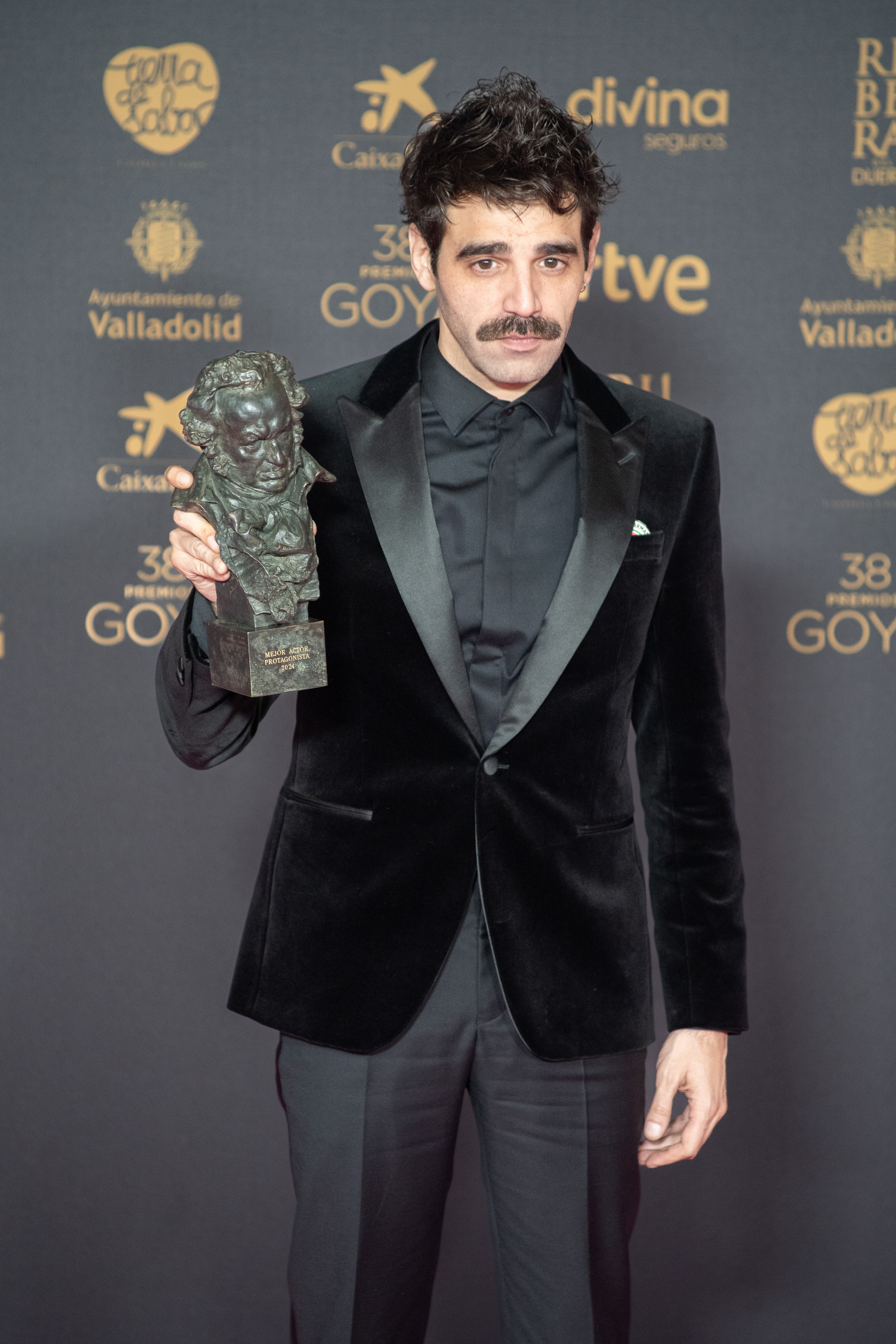
David Verdaguer won for Jokes & Cigarettes (2023).

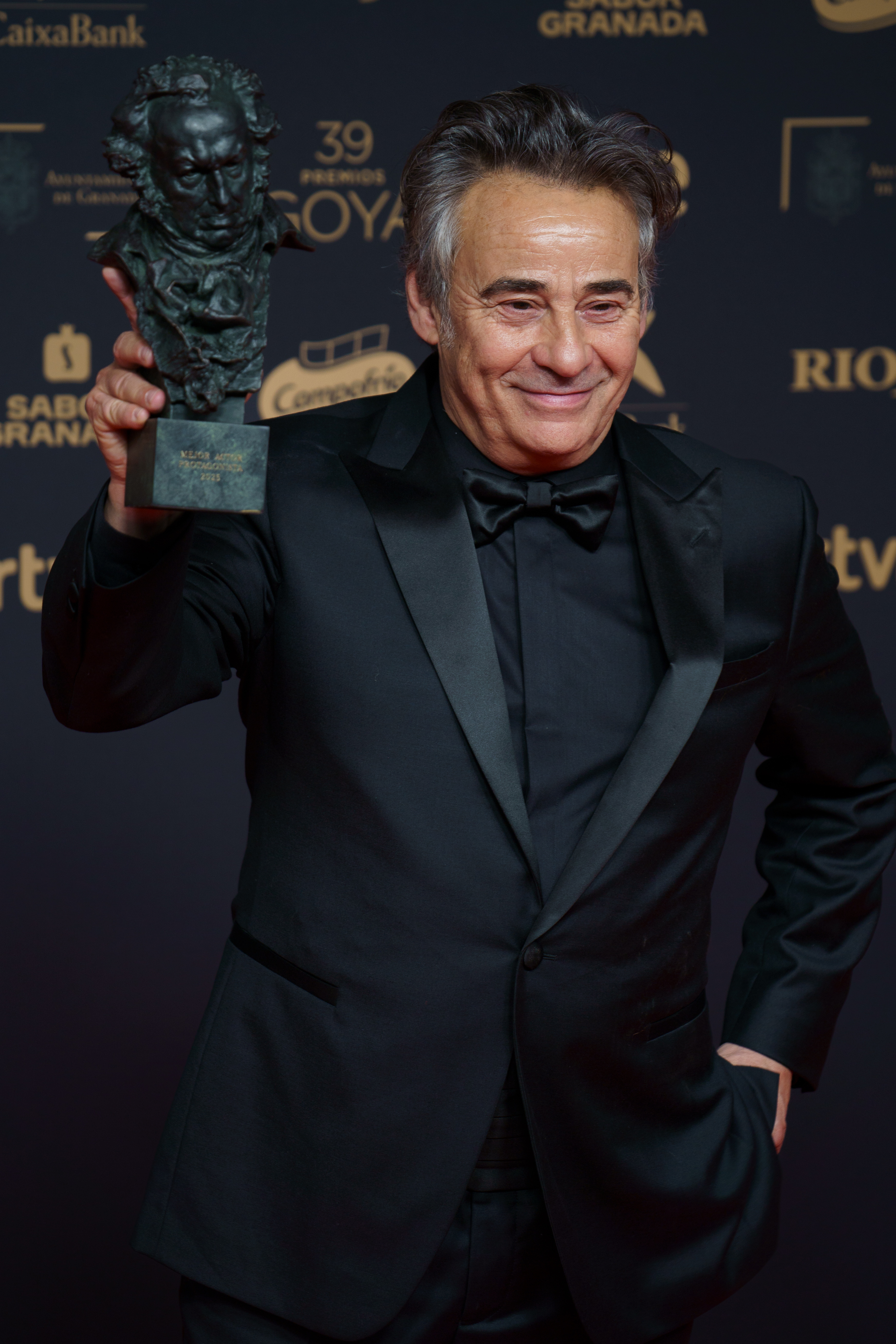
Eduard Fernández has won twice, for Fausto 5.0 in 2001 and Marco (2024)

Year	Actor	Role(s)	English title	Original title
2020 (35th)	Mario Casas	Daniel Aranda	Cross the Line	No matarás
2020 (35th)	Javier Cámara	Julio	The People Upstairs	Sentimental
2020 (35th)	Ernesto Alterio	Ernesto	The Sea Beyond	Un mundo normal
2020 (35th)	David Verdaguer	Aleix	One for All	Uno para todos
2021 (36th)	Javier Bardem	Julio Blanco	The Good Boss	El buen patrón
2021 (36th)	Javier Gutiérrez	Javier	The Daughter	La hija
2021 (36th)	Eduard Fernández	Òscar Camps	Mediterraneo: The Law of the Sea	Mediterráneo
2021 (36th)	Luis Tosar	Ibon Etxezarreta	Maixabel	
2022 (37th)	Denis Ménochet	Antoine Denis	The Beasts	As bestas
2022 (37th)	Luis Tosar	Rafa	On the Fringe	En los márgenes
2022 (37th)	Nacho Sánchez	Julián	Manticore	Mantícora
2022 (37th)	Javier Gutiérrez	José Pino	Prison 77	Modelo 77
2022 (37th)	Miguel Herrán	Manuel Gómez	Prison 77	Modelo 77
2023 (38th)	David Verdaguer	Eugenio	Jokes & Cigarettes	Saben aquell
2023 (38th)	Manolo Solo	Miguel Garay	Close Your Eyes	Cerrar los ojos
2023 (38th)	Enric Auquer	Antoni Benaiges	The Teacher Who Promised the Sea	El maestro que prometió el mar
2023 (38th)	Hovik Keuchkerian	Andreas	Un amor	
2023 (38th)	Alberto Ammann	Diego	Upon Entry	Upon Entry (La llegada)
2024 (39th)	Eduard Fernández	Enric Marco	Marco, the Invented Truth	Marco, la verdad inventada
2024 (39th)	Alberto San Juan	Carlos	A House on Fire	Casa en flames
2024 (39th)	Alfredo Castro	Flavio	They Will Be Dust	Polvo serán
2024 (39th)	Urko Olazabal	Ismael Álvarez	I Am Nevenka	Soy Nevenka
2024 (39th)	Vito Sanz	Álex	The Other Way Around	Volveréis
2025 (40th)	José Ramón Soroiz	Vicente	Maspalomas	
2025 (40th)	Alberto San Juan	Genaro	The Dinner	La cena
2025 (40th)	Miguel Garcés	Iñaki	Sundays	Los domingos
2025 (40th)	Mario Casas	Sergio	Away	Molt lluny
2025 (40th)	Manolo Solo	Fernando / Manuel	The Portuguese House	Una quinta portuguesa

== Multiple nominations ==
The following 17 winners of the Goya Award for Best Actor have received multiple nominations for the award.

Name	Awards	Nominations
Javier Bardem	5	10
Luis Tosar	2	8
Eduard Fernández	2	7
Alfredo Landa	2	7
Fernando Fernán Gómez	2	5
Javier Gutiérrez	2	5
Antonio de la Torre	1	8
Javier Cámara	1	5
Jorge Sanz	1	4
Antonio Banderas	1	4
Juan Diego	1	3
Carmelo Gómez	1	3
Ricardo Darín	1	3
Alberto San Juan	1	3
Juan Luis Galiardo	1	2
Antonio Resines	1	2
José Coronado	1	2
David Verdaguer	1	2
Mario Casas	1	2
