= El río que nos lleva =

- Film poster
- Directed by: Antonio del Real
- Screenplay by: Antonio Larreta; José Luis Sampedro; Antonio del Real
- Based on: El río que nos lleva; José Luis Sampedro
- Starring: Tony Peck; Alfredo Landa; Eulalia Ramón
- Cinematography: Federico Ribes
- Edited by: Miguel González Sinde
- Music by: Lluís Llach; Carles Cases
- Production company: Producciones Dulcinea
- Distributed by: Lauren Films
- Release dates: 28 September 1989 (Cine Fuencarral); 29 September 1989 (Spain)
- Country: Spain
- Language: Spanish

El río que nos lleva is a 1989 Spanish drama film directed by Antonio del Real based on the novel of the same name by José Luis Sampedro. It stars Tony Peck, Alfredo Landa, and Eulàlia Ramon.

== Plot ==
Set in 1946, the plot depicts the last log driving in the Tagus from Peralejos de las Truchas to Aranjuez, focusing on the plight of Roy Shannon, an Irishman joining a group of humble gancheros (log drivers) led by El Americano.

== Cast ==
- Alfredo Landa as El Americano
- Tony Peck as Roy Shannon
- Eulàlia Ramon as Paula
- Santiago Ramos as Dámaso
- Mario Pardo as Seco
- Fernando Fernán-Gómez as Don Ángel
- Antonio Gamero as Cacholo
- Concha Cuetos as Cándida
- Juanjo Artero as Rubio
- Ovidi Montllor as Cuatrodedos

== Production ==
The film is a Producciones Dulcinea production. It was shot almost entirely in the province of Guadalajara.

== Release ==
The film received a pre-screening at the Cine Fuencarral on 28 September 1989. Distributed by Lauren Films, it was released theatrically in Spain on 29 September 1989. It grossed 36,026,125 million ₧ (94,730 admissions).

== Accolades ==
Year	Award	Category	Nominee(s)	Result	Ref.
1990	4th Goya Awards	Best Actor	Alfredo Landa	Nominated	

== See also ==
- List of Spanish films of 1989
