= Alfredo Landa =

Spanish actor (1933-2013)

The Most Excellent Alfredo Landa
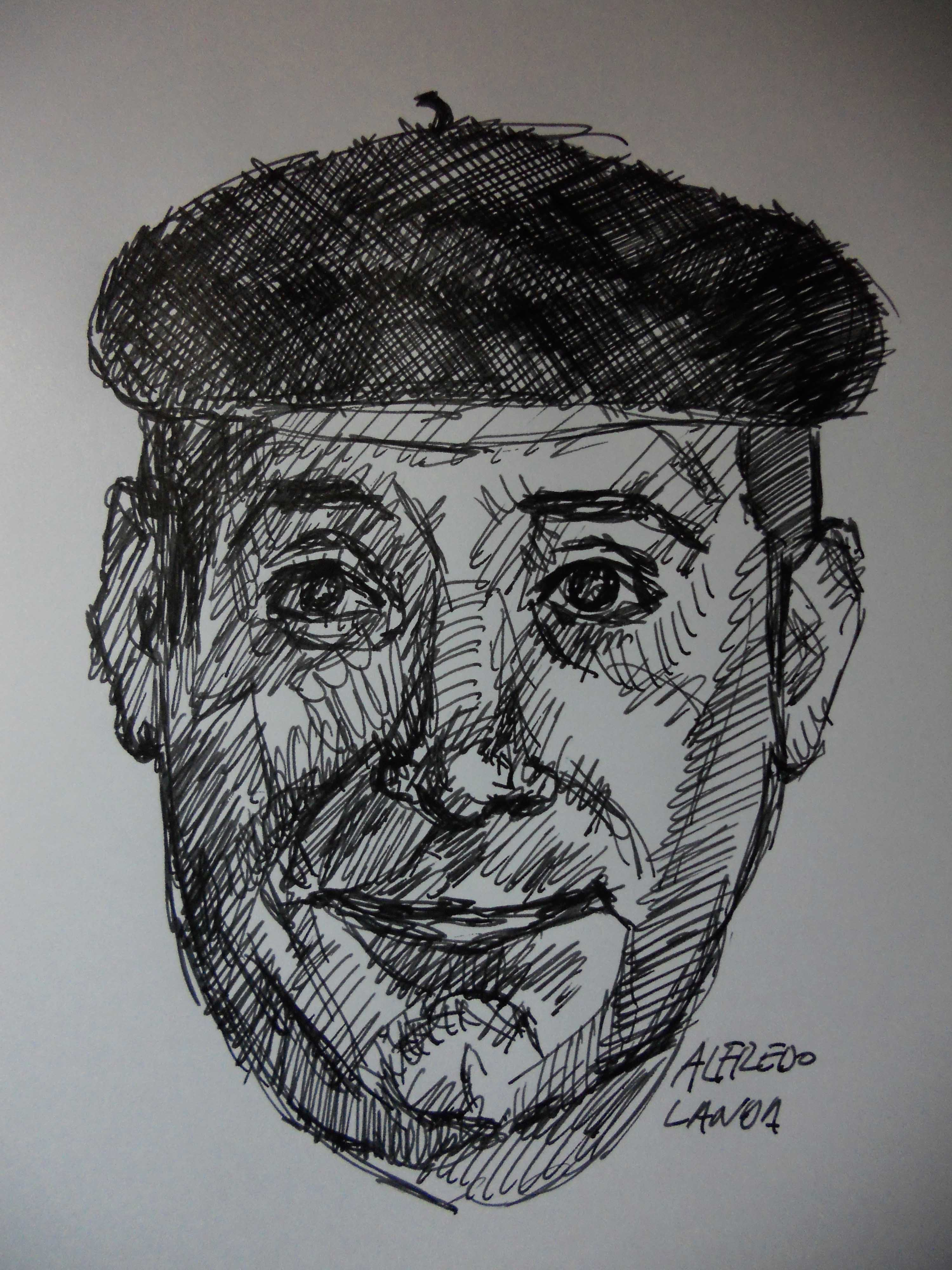
- Born: Alfredo Landa Areta; 3 March 1933; Pamplona, Navarre
- Died: 9 May 2013 (aged 80); Madrid, Spain
- Occupation: Actor
- Years active: 1957–2007
- Spouse: Maite Imaz Aramendi
- Children: Ainhoa, Idoia and Alfredo

Alfredo Landa Areta (3 March 1933 – 9 May 2013) was a Spanish actor.

== Biography ==
He was born in Pamplona, Navarre. He finished his pre-university studies in San Sebastián. He then began university studies in law, where he began to work with university school groups. He left university to work in the theater.

After working as a dubbing actor for a short time in the 1950s, he debuted with his first considerable role in film in José María Forqué's Atraco a las tres in 1962.

During the growth of sex comedies in Spanish cinema, Landa became the "sexually repressed" role of that trend (especially under directors Mariano Ozores and Pedro Lazaga). The trend came to be known as landismo.

Afterwards, Landa changed his image, taking much deeper roles, like his bandit in El Bosque animado.

Landa, along with Francisco Rabal, won the Best Actor award at 1984 Cannes Film Festival for his memorable performance in Los santos inocentes.

After a career with more than one hundred and twenty movies, one dozen of television series, and several stage successes, with a great amount of Spanish and European awards, 74-year-old Landa announced his retirement at the X Festival de Cine de Málaga (10th Movie Festival of Málaga) while receiving a new award.

Landa died on May 9, 2013, following complications from Alzheimer's disease at the age of 80.

== Filmography ==
Year	Title	Role	Director	Notes
1956	Around the World in 80 Days	Minor Role	Michael Anderson	Uncredited
1958	El puente de la paz	Jornalero burro	Rafael J. Salvia	Uncredited
1962	Atraco a las tres		José María Forqué	
1963	El verdugo	Sacristán	Luis García Berlanga	
1963	The Fair of the Dove	Manolo	José Luis Sáenz de Heredia	
1963	Se vive una sola vez		Arturo González	
1964	Llegaron los marcianos	X4	Franco Castellano and Pipolo	
1964	La niña de luto	Rafael Castroviejo	Manuel Summers	
1964	Casi un caballero	Gabriel Mostazo	José María Forqué	
1965	Television Stories	Antonio Parrondo y Carnicero, novio de Katy (2)	José Luis Sáenz de Heredia	
1965	Whisky y vodka	Cosme	Fernando Palacios	
1965	Aragonese Nobility	Perico	Juan de Orduña	
1966	Ninette y un señor de Murcia	Armando Espinosa	Fernando Fernán Gómez	
1966	La ciudad no es para mí	Genaro	Pedro Lazaga	
1966	Nuevo en esta plaza	Marcial Flores 'El Verónicas'	Pedro Lazaga	
1966	El arte de no casarse	Alfonso de la Peña y Peña, abogado (1) / Alfredo, marqués (2) / Benito López (3) / Pascual, soldado (4)	Jorge Feliu and José María Font	
1966	Hoy como ayer	Felipe	Mariano Ozores	
1966	Las viudas	Valentín Martínez	José María Forqué	(segment "El Retrato de Regino")
1966	El arte de casarse	Dr. León Hernández / Antolín	Jorge Feliu and José María Font	(segment "Amor con amor se paga") / (segment "Pastoral")
1967	Amor a la española	Rafa	Fernando Merino	
1967	Los guardiamarinas	Ignacio Vidal	Pedro Lazaga	
1967	¿Qué hacemos con los hijos?	Enrique	Pedro Lazaga	
1967	Las cicatrices	Tormento	Pedro Lazaga	
1967	Crónica de nueve meses	Alejandro	Mariano Ozores	
1967	De cuerpo presente	Joe	Antonio Eceiza	
1967	Las que tienen que servir	Antonio Ponce de León	José María Forqué	
1967	Novios 68	Pepe García Moratillo, fontanero	Pedro Lazaga	
1967	Pero ¿en qué país vivimos?	Rodolfo Sicilia	José Luis Sáenz de Heredia	
1968	Forty Degrees in the Shade	Máximo	Mariano Ozores	
1968	Un diablo bajo la almohada	Brocheros	José María Forqué	
1968	Los subdesarrollados	Timoteo Fonseca	Fernando Merino	
1968	Farewell to Marriage	Casimiro Rodríguez, el albañil	Juan de Orduña	
1968	No somos de piedra	Lucas Fernández	Manuel Summers	
1968	Los que tocan el piano	Venancio Torralba 'El Torralba'	Javier Aguirre	
1968	Tuset Street	Cheering Man in Audience	Luis Marquina	Uncredited
1968	La dinamita está servida	Bruno - El jeque árabe	Fernando Merino	
1969	Una vez al año ser hippy no hace daño	Ricardo	Javier Aguirre	
1969	¿Por qué te engaña tu marido?	Eduardo	Manuel Summers	
1969	No disponible		Pedro Mario Herrero	
1969	Cuatro noches de boda	Lorenzo Jiménez Albo	Mariano Ozores	
1969	Soltera y madre en la vida	Paco	Javier Aguirre	
1969	Las leandras	Casildo	Eugenio Martín	
1970	El alma se serena	Manolo Cortés	José Luis Sáenz de Heredia	
1970	Cateto a babor	Miguel Cañete Moste	Ramón Fernández	
1970	No desearás al vecino del quinto	Antón Gutiérrez	Ramón Fernández	
1971	La decente	Comisario Miranda	José Luis Sáenz de Heredia	
1971	Vente a Alemania, Pepe	Pepe	Pedro Lazaga	
1971	Préstame quince días	Galdino	Fernando Merino	
1971	El diablo cojuelo	Cleofás Pérez Zambullo	Ramón Fernández	
1971	Aunque la hormona se vista de seda	Bienvenido Garcés	Vicente Escrivá	
1971	Si estás muerto, ¿por qué bailas?	Inspector Murphy	Pedro Mario Herrero	
1971	No desearás la mujer del vecino	Pedro	Fernando Merino	
1971	Los días de Cabirio	Alfredo Velázquez	Fernando Merino	
1971	Simón, contamos contigo	Simón Giménez / Alquimista / Comerciante / Padre de Simón	Ramón Fernández	
1972	Vente a ligar al Oeste	Benito	Pedro Lazaga	
1972	No firmes más letras, cielo	Sabino Gurupe	Pedro Lazaga	
1972	Los novios de mi mujer	Emilio Antúnez	Ramón Fernández	
1972	Guapo heredero busca esposa	Fidel Frutos	Luis M. Delgado	
1972	París bien vale una moza	Juan	Pedro Lazaga	
1973	Pisito de solteras	Emilio Vallejo	Fernando Merino	
1973	Las estrellas están verdes	Luis Oñate	Pedro Lazaga	
1973	Manolo la nuit	Manolo Olmedillo	Mariano Ozores	
1974	Jenaro, el de los catorce	Jenaro Castrillo	Mariano Ozores	
1974	Un curita cañón	Padre Saturio	Luis M. Delgado	
1974	Dormir y ligar todo es empezar	Saturnino del Olmo	Mariano Ozores	
1974	El reprimido	Lucas Trigo	Mariano Ozores	
1974	Las obsesiones de Armando	Armando	Luis M. Delgado	
1974	Fin de semana al desnudo	Rodolfo	Mariano Ozores	
1975	Cuando el cuerno suena	José	Luis M. Delgado	
1975	Los pecados de una chica casi decente	Gino	Mariano Ozores	
1975	Solo ante el streaking	Ángel Perales	José Luis Sáenz de Heredia	
1976	Celedonio y yo somos así	Daniel Martínez	Mariano Ozores	
1976	Esclava te doy	Alberto	Eugenio Martín	
1976	Mayordomo para todo	Germán	Mariano Ozores	
1976	Alcalde por elección	Federico Villalba / Ricardo Smith	Mariano Ozores	
1977	El puente	Juan	Juan Antonio Bardem	
1977	Tío ¿de verdad vienen de París?	Alberto	Mariano Ozores	
1977	Borrasca		Miguel Ángel Rivas	
1979	Historia de S.	Sebastián	Francisco Lara Polop	
1979	Las verdes praderas	José Rebolledo	José Luis Garci	
1979	El rediezcubrimiento de México	Ceferino Díaz Fernández	Fernando Cortés	
1979	Paco el seguro	Paco	Didier Haudepin	
1979	Polvos mágicos	Arturo	José Ramón Larraz	
1980	'Forja de amigos	Padre Velasco	Tito Davison	
1980	El alcalde y la política	Tomás Sierra	Luis M. Delgado	
1980	El canto de la cigarra	Aris	José María Forqué	
1981	El crack	Germán Areta	José Luis Garci	
1981	El poderoso influjo de la luna	Morán	Antonio del Real	
1981	Profesor eróticus	Profesor Mussy	Luis M. Delgado	
1981	Préstame a tu mujer	Blas	Jesús Yagüe	
1982	La próxima estación	José Luis	Antonio Mercero	
1983	Un Rolls para Hipólito	Hipólito Castañón	Juan Bosch	
1983	El crack II	Germán Areta	José Luis Garci	
1983	Las autonosuyas	Austrasigildo	Rafael Gil	
1984	Piernas cruzadas	Jeremías	Rafael Villaseñor	
1984	Los santos inocentes	Paco, El Bajo	Mario Camus	
1984	Una rosa al viento	José	Miguel Iglesias	
1985	La vaquilla	Brigada Castro	Luis García Berlanga	
1985	Los paraísos perdidos	Benito	Basilio Martín Patino	
1986	Bandera negra	Patxi	Pedro Olea	
1986	Tata mía	Teo	José Luis Borau	
1987	¡Biba la banda!	Sargento Pérez	Ricardo Palacios	
1987	El pecador impecable	Honorio Sigüenza	Augusto Martínez Torres	
1987	El bosque animado	Malvís / Bandido Fendetestas	José Luis Cuerda	
1988	Sinatra	Sinatra	Francesc Betriu	
1989	El río que nos lleva	El Americano	Antonio del Real	
1990	Bazar Viena		Amalio Cuevas	
1991	Marcelino, pan y vino	Frate Pappina	Luigi Comencini	
1992	Aquí, quién no corre, vuela	Teo	Ramón Fernández	
1992	La marrana	Bartolomé	José Luis Cuerda	
1994	Canción de cuna	Don José	José Luis Garci	
1994	Por fin solos	Arturo	Antonio del Real	
1995	El rey del río	Antón Costa	Manuel Gutiérrez Aragón	
1996	Los Porretas	Segismundo Porretas	Carlos Suárez	
2000	El árbol del penitente	El Cura	José María Borrell	
2000	La isla del cangrejo (2000)	Narrator (Sam)	Txavi Basterretxea and Joxan Muñoz	Voice
2002	Historia de un beso	Blas Otamendi	José Luis Garci	
2002	El refugio del mal	Gasolinero	Félix Cábez	
2003	La luz prodigiosa	Joaquín	Miguel Hermoso	
2003	El oro de Moscú	Faustino Peláez	Jesús Bonilla	
2004	Tiovivo c. 1950	Eusebio Cascajero y Esparza	José Luis Garci	
2007	El Arca de Noé	God	Juan Pablo Buscarini	Voice
2007	Luz de domingo	Joaco	José Luis Garci	(final film role)

== Awards and nominations ==
In 2008 he received the Prince of Viana Prize from the Government of Navarre for promoting his homeland, but he also has received many film prizes throughout his career:

Cannes Film Festival

Year	Award	Film	Result
1984	Best Actor Award	Los santos inocentes	Won

Goya Awards

Year	Award	Film	Result
1987	Best Leading Actor	El bosque animado	Won
1988	Best Leading Actor	Sinatra	Nominated
1989	Best Leading Actor	El río que nos lleva	Nominated
1992	Best Leading Actor	La marrana	Won
1994	Best Leading Actor	Canción de cuna	Nominated
2003	Best Leading Actor	La luz prodigiosa	Nominated
2007	Best Leading Actor	Luz de domingo	Nominated
2007	Honorary Goya Award		Won

Fotogramas de Plata

Year	Award	Film	Result
1984	Best Film Actor	Los santos inocentes	Nominated
1987	Best Film Actor	¡Biba la banda! El bosque animado El pecador impecable	Nominated
1992	Best TV Actor	El Quijote de Miguel de Cervantes	Nominated
1993	Best TV Actor	Lleno, por favor	Nominated
2007	Best Film Actor	Luz de domingo	Nominated

Spanish Actor's Guild

Year	Award	Film	Result
1992	Best Film Leading Actor	La marrana	Nominated
1993	Best TV Leading Actor	Lleno, por favor	Nominated
2007	Best Film Leading Actor	Luz de domingo	Won

TP de Oro

Year	Award	Film	Result
1984	Best actor	Ninette y un señor de Murcia	Won
1986	Best actor	Tristeza de amor	Won
1993	Best actor	Lleno, por favor	Won

Círculo de Escritores Cinematográficos

Year	Award	Film	Result
1981	Best actor	El crack	Won
1994	Best actor	Canción de cuna	Won
2007	Best actor	Luz de domingo	Won

== Honours ==
- Gold Medal of Merit in Labour (Kingdom of Spain, 5 December 2008).
