= Elisa, vida mía =

- French film poster
- Directed by: Carlos Saura
- Written by: Carlos Saura
- Produced by: Elías Querejeta
- Starring: Fernando Rey; Geraldine Chaplin
- Cinematography: Teo Escamilla
- Edited by: Pablo González del Amo
- Music by: Giorgio Mainiero; Erik Satie from "Gnossienne No. 3"
- Release dates: 21 April 1977 (Spain); 11 March 1983 (New York City)
- Running time: 125 minutes
- Country: Spain
- Language: Spanish

Elisa, Vida mía (English: Elisa, My Life) is a 1977 Spanish drama film written and directed by Carlos Saura. The film stars Saura's long-term companion and frequent collaborator, Geraldine Chaplin. She stars alongside Fernando Rey, who won the Best Actor award at the 1977 Cannes Film Festival for his performance.

== Plot ==
On a secluded farmhouse in Castile and León, Luis is reunited with his estranged daughter, Elisa, after a 20-year separation. On the farmhouse, Luis writes what sometimes appears to be both an autobiography and a novel. The book is played out with memories of the past, such as when Luis walked out on his family and is mixed with fantasies about Elisa's adult life and her failed marriage.

== Cast ==
- Geraldine Chaplin as Elisa Santamaria/mother of Elisa
- Fernando Rey as Luis
- Ana Torrent as Elisa as child
- Norman Briski as Antonio
- Isabel Mestres as Isabel, Elisa's sister
- Joaquín Hinojosa as Julián, Isabel's husband
- Arantxa Escamilla as little girl
- Jacobo Escamillaa as little boy
- Francisco Guijar as the doctor

== Reception ==
Vincent Canby of The New York Times praised Chaplin and Rey; "The main reasons to see the film are the two leading performances. Mr. Rey is always an interesting presence, and Miss Chaplin, as in all of her Saura films, reveals qualities of feeling, control and beauty that no other directors have ever found."

Saura was nominated for the Palme d'Or for the film, and won Best Director at Spain's Cinema Writers Circle Awards.
