= The Sow =

- Theatrical release poster
- Spanish: La marrana
- Directed by: José Luis Cuerda
- Written by: José Luis Cuerda
- Starring: Alfredo Landa; Antonio Resines; Agustín González; Manuel Aleixandre; El Gran Wyoming; Cayetana Guillén Cuervo; Fernando Rey
- Cinematography: Hans Burmann
- Production companies: Central de Producciones Audiovisuales; Antea Films
- Distributed by: United International Pictures
- Release dates: 30 October 1992 (Seminci); 6 November 1992 (Spain)
- Country: Spain
- Language: Spanish

The Sow (Spanish: La marrana) is a 1992 Spanish rural comedy and adventure film directed and written by José Luis Cuerda which stars Alfredo Landa and Antonio Resines.

== Plot ==
Starting in the summer of 1492, the plot shows the mishaps of the common folk (two vagrants, Bartolomé and Ruy, respectively a man freed from captivity in Tunis and a deserter from the Granada War, accompanied by a sow) living badly in the Crown of Castile, seeking to embark on a caravel in the harbor of Palos.

== Cast ==
- Alfredo Landa as Bartolomé
- Antonio Resines as Ruy
- Manuel Alexandre
- Fernando Rey
- Cayetana Guillén Cuervo
- El Gran Wyoming
- Agustín González
- Antonio Dechent

== Production ==
The film is a Central de Producciones Audiovisuales and Antea Films production, and also had support from the Ministry of Culture and Generalitat Valenciana. Shooting locations included Trujillo, Boadilla del Monte, La Alberca, and the Veruela Abbey.

== Release ==
The film had its world premiere at the Valladolid International Film Festival (Seminci) in October 1992. It was theatrically released in Spain on 6 November 1992.

== Reception ==
Ángel Fernández-Santos of El País deemed The Sow to be a "well made, amusing and a tad coarse" film, with a tendency to scatological humour and the picaresque novel dialogues.

== Accolades ==
Year	Award	Category	Nominee(s)	Result	Ref.
1993	7th Goya Awards	Best Actor	Alfredo Landa	Won	
1993	7th Goya Awards	Best Cinematography	Hans Burmann	Nominated	

== See also ==
- List of Spanish films of 1992
