= Como un relámpago =

1996 film by Miguel Hermoso

- Theatrical release poster
- Directed by: Miguel Hermoso
- Starring: Santiago Ramos; Assumpta Serna; Eloy Azorín
- Cinematography: Fernando Arribas
- Edited by: Blanca Guillem
- Music by: Alfredo Brito; Óscar Gómez; Víctor Reyes
- Production companies: Los Films del Tango; Antea Films
- Distributed by: United International Pictures
- Release dates: November 1996 (Huelva); 17 January 1997 (Spain)
- Country: Spain
- Language: Spanish

Como un relámpago is a 1996 Spanish melodrama film directed by Miguel Hermoso which stars Santiago Ramos, Assumpta Serna, and Eloy Azorín. Santiago Ramos was awarded the Goya Award for Best Actor for his performance.

== Plot ==
Upper-class teenager Pablo living with mother Sonia (a lawyer and former far-left and feminist activist) decides to look for his father Rafael, who abandoned Pablo in his childhood. Thanks to his neighbor, he discovers that he lives in Gran Canaria, and he does not hesitate to pay him a visit.

== Cast ==
- Santiago Ramos as Rafael Torres
- Eloy Azorín as Pablo
- Assumpta Serna as Sonia Peña
- Héctor Cantolla as Ricardo
- Chema Muñoz as Joaquín
- Isabel Prinz as divorciada
- Carmen Segarra as Herminia
- Luis Gutiérrez as F.B. Fornari
- Elizabeth Pulido as Mireya

== Production ==
The film is a Los Films del Tango and Antea Films production.

== Release ==
The film screened at the 23rd Huelva Ibero-American Film Festival in 1996. It was released theatrically in Spain on 17 January 1997.

== Awards ==
| Year | Award | Category | Nominee(s) | Result | Ref. |
|---|---|---|---|---|---|
| 1996 | 23rd Huelva Ibero-American Film Festival | Golden Columbus | | Won | |
| 1997 | 11th Goya Awards | Best Actor | Santiago Ramos | Won | |

== See also ==
- List of Spanish films of 1997
