= The End of a Mystery =

2003 film

- Film poster
- Spanish: La luz prodigiosa
- Directed by: Miguel Hermoso
- Screenplay by: Fernando Marías
- Based on: La luz prodigiosa by Fernando Marías
- Starring: Alfredo Landa
- Cinematography: Carlos Suárez
- Music by: Ennio Morricone
- Production companies: Azalea PC; Canal Sur Televisión; Surf Films
- Release date: 31 January 2003 (Spain)
- Running time: 108 minutes
- Countries: Spain; Italy
- Language: Spanish

The End of a Mystery (Spanish: La luz prodigiosa) is a 2003 Spanish-Italian drama film directed by Miguel Hermoso. The screenplay by Fernando Marías is an adaptation of his 1990 novel La luz prodigiosa.

== Cast ==
- Alfredo Landa as Joaquín
- Nino Manfredi as Galápago
- Kiti Manver as Adela
- José Luis Gómez as Silvio
- Iván Corvacho Cervantes as the boy Joaquín
- Sergio Villanueva as the boy Galápago
- Mariano Peña
- Fanny de Castro as the Nun
- Fernando Picón as the Lawyer
- Miguel Alcíbar as the Falangist

== Production ==
A Spanish/Italian co-production, the film was produced by Azalea PC, Canal Sur Televisión and Surf Films, and it had the participation of Vía Digital and FORTA.

== Release ==
The film was theatrically released on 31 January 2003.

== Accolades ==
Year	Award	Category	Nominee(s)	Result	Ref.
2003	25th Moscow International Film Festival	Golden St. George		Won	
2004	18th Goya Awards	Best Adapted Screenplay	Fernando Marías	Nominated	
2004	18th Goya Awards	Best Actor	Alfredo Landa	Nominated	
2004	18th Goya Awards	Best Supporting Actor	José Luis Gómez	Nominated	
2004	18th Goya Awards	Best Art Direction	Félix Murcia	Nominated	

== See also ==
- List of Spanish films of 2003
- List of Italian films of 2003
