= All Is Silence =

- Theatrical release poster
- Spanish: Todo es silencio
- Directed by: José Luis Cuerda
- Screenplay by: Manuel Rivas
- Based on: Todo es silencio by Manuel Rivas
- Produced by: Gerardo Herrero
- Starring: Quim Gutiérrez; Miguel Ángel Silvestre; Celia Freijeiro; Juan Diego
- Cinematography: Hanns Burmann
- Edited by: Nacho Ruiz Capillas
- Music by: Sergio Moure
- Production companies: Tornasol Films; Castafiore Films; Milú Films; Zebra Producciones; Foresta Films
- Distributed by: Alta Films
- Release dates: 20 October 2012 (Seminci); 9 November 2012 (Spain)
- Country: Spain
- Language: Spanish

All Is Silence (Spanish: Todo es silencio) is a 2012 Spanish drama film directed by José Luis Cuerda from a screenplay by Manuel Rivas based on Rivas' novel of the same name which stars Quim Gutiérrez, Miguel Ángel Silvestre, and Celia Freijeiro alongside Juan Diego.

== Plot ==
Set in 1969 and 1989, against the backdrop of drug-trafficking on the Galician coast, the plot follows three childhood friends (Fins, Leda, and Brinco). Twenty years later, Fins has become a cop, whilst Brinco has become a minion of crime lord Mariscal, with Leda standing between them.

== Cast ==
- Quim Gutiérrez as Fins
- Axel Fernández as Fins (teen)
- Celia Freijeiro as Leda
- Carolina Cao as Leda (teen)
- Miguel Ángel Silvestre as Brinco
- Sergio González as Brinco (teen)
- Juan Diego as Mariscal
- Chete Lera as Rumbo
- Iria Penha as Sira
- Laura Ponte as Guadalupe
- Teresa Hurtado as Mara Doval
- Xoque Carbajal as Chelín
- Iago Mira as Chelín (teen)
- Mario Roldán as Carburo
- Miguel Lago Casal as inverno
- Miguel de Lira as Óscar Mendoza
- Luis Zahera as Malpica
- Rebeca Montero as Amparo
- Andrea Muhlova as Nora rusa
- Adolfo Fernández as Humberto Alisal
- José Luis Cuerda as Grimaldo
- Jesús Castejón as Sarxento Montes
- Gabriel Ángel Delgado as Santi
- Lucía Álvarez as Mónica
- Xosé Manuel Olveira "Pico" as Antonio
- Juan García as Belvís (teen)
- Iván Marcos as banqueiro
- Julio Ruíz Tejela as Delmiro
- Adrián Castiñeiras as centenela
- Fernando Morán as Don Marcelon
- Estíbaliz Veiga as enfermeira
- Miguel Borines as médico Cruz Vermella
- Fernando Acebal as Oficial Alfándegas
- Andrea G. Nespereira as xornalista
- Miro Magariños as Commnis Telmo
- Cristina Ramallal as xornalista
- Paula Semikozova as moza hippie

== Production ==
The film is a Tornasol Films, Castafiore Films, Milú Films, Zebra Producciones and Foresta Films production. Shooting began in Galicia on 29 August 2011. It later moved to the Ciudad de la Luz studio in Alicante.

== Release ==
The film opened the 57th Valladolid International Film Festival (Seminci) on 20 October 2012. Distributed by Alta Films, it was released theatrically in Spain on 9 November 2012.

== Reception ==
Boyd van Hoeij of Variety deemed the film to be "a dud" and "a juiceless adaptation", with the script failing "to develop a dramatic undertow that ties the film's two incongruous halves together", "impeccable" period detail notwithstanding.

Sergio F. Pinilla rated the film 3 out of 5 stars, underscoring it to be "a love triangle story without angles or enough punch".

== Accolades ==
Year	Award	Category	Nominee(s)	Result	Ref.
2013	27th Goya Awards	Best Adapted Screenplay	Manuel Rivas	Nominated	
2013	11th Mestre Mateo Awards	Best Actress	Celia Freijeiro	Nominated	
2013	11th Mestre Mateo Awards	Best Supporting Actor	Luis Zahera	Won	
2013	11th Mestre Mateo Awards	Best Screenplay	Manuel Rivas	Nominated	
2013	11th Mestre Mateo Awards	Best Original Score	Sergio Moure	Nominated	
2013	11th Mestre Mateo Awards	Best Makeup and Hairstyles	Almudena Fonseca	Nominated	

== See also ==
- List of Spanish films of 2012
