= El Quijote de Miguel de Cervantes =

Spanish television series (1992)

- Genre: Comedy, Adventure, Drama
- Based on: Don Quixote by Miguel de Cervantes
- Screenplay by: Camilo José Cela
- Directed by: Manuel Gutiérrez Aragón
- Starring: Fernando Rey; Alfredo Landa
- Composer: Lalo Schifrin
- Country of origin: Spain
- Original language: Spanish
- No. of seasons: 1
- No. of episodes: 5

Production
- Producer: Emiliano Piedra
- Cinematography: Teo Escamilla
- Editor: José Salcedo
- Running time: 310 min.
- Production company: Televisión Española
- Budget: 1.2 billion ₧

Original release
- Network: La Primera
- Release: 29 January – 26 February 1992

El Quijote de Miguel de Cervantes is a Spanish prime-time television series based on the 17th century novel Don Quixote by Miguel de Cervantes. Produced by Emiliano Piedra for Televisión Española, it was directed by Manuel Gutiérrez Aragón, with screenplay by Camilo José Cela and starring Fernando Rey as Don Quixote and Alfredo Landa as Sancho Panza. Its five episodes adapting the first part of the novel were broadcast on La Primera of Televisión Española in 1992.

== Plot ==
Alonso Quixano, a nobleman from La Mancha of about fifty years of age and of medium economic position, is so enthused by the books of chivalry that he decides to become a knight-errant under the name of Don Quixote and to go out on adventures accompanied by his faithful squire Sancho. The special madness of Don Quixote and Sancho's fascination with the words of his lord are revealed little by little, in contrast to the brutality and ridicule that both well-intentioned characters are subjected to by those they try to help.

== Production ==
The adaptation project of Don Quixote for television was born with Pilar Miró as General Director of RTVE. It was Televisión Española's most ambitious production up to that date. The initial intention was to make a series with a first part of eight episodes adapting the first part of the novel, directed by Manuel Gutiérrez Aragón, and a second of ten episodes adapting the second part, directed by Mario Camus, but the economic situation of the network reduced the first part of the series to five episodes and the second to four episodes.

Emiliano Piedra, the producer responsible for the adaptation, began the preparations for the first part in 1989 with a budget of 1.2 billion pesetas, with screenplay by Camilo José Cela and with Fernando Rey as Don Quixote and Alfredo Landa as Sancho Panza. Cela wrote an initial script, but it was a literal transcription of the novel with no cinematographic meaning, so it had to be completely rewritten. Despite this, he was kept in the credits both for the prestige that his name gave to the project and for the outlay that his work had entailed. Principal photography took from April to December 1990, with the interiors shot at TVE's Buñuel studios in Madrid and the exteriors on location in the Community of Madrid and La Mancha. The first five episodes premiered on La Primera of Televisión Española in January 1992.

Gutiérrez Aragón prepared new scripts in the summer of 1992 for the second part, but the network's financial problems and the impossibility of bringing together the same team after the death of producer Emiliano Piedra made it impossible to film it. He eventually wrote and directed a feature film titled Don Quixote, Knight Errant adapting the second part of the novel with Juan Luis Galiardo as Don Quixote and Carlos Iglesias as Sancho Panza that was released in 2002.

== Cast ==
Rey (right) as Don Quixote and Landa (left) as Sancho Panza.

- Fernando Rey as Alonso Quixano/Don Quixote
- Alfredo Landa as Sancho Panza
- Francisco Merino as priest
- Manuel Alexandre as barber
- Emma Penella as Teresa Panza
- José Luis Pellicena as Miguel de Cervantes
- José Luis López Vázquez as innkeeper
- Terele Pávez as housekeeper
- Esperanza Roy as Maritornes
- Antonio Gamero
- Rafael Alonso
- Aldo Sambrell
- Aitana Sánchez-Gijón as Dorotea
- Héctor Alterio
- Máximo Valverde
- Alejandra Grepi as Luscinda

== Episodes ==
The series premiered on 29 January 1992 in prime-time on La Primera of Televisión Española and its five episodes had an average of 4,583,000 viewers and 29.1% of share.

No.	Title	Original release date	Spain viewers (millions)
1	"Episode 1"	29 January 1992	7.2376
2	"Episode 2"	5 February 1992	N/A
3	"Episode 3"	12 February 1992	N/A
4	"Episode 4"	19 February 1992	N/A
5	"Episode 5"	26 February 1992	3.8

== Accolades ==
=== FIPA d'or ===
Year	Category	Recipient	Result	Ref.
1992	Best Series		Won	
1992	Best Actor	Fernando Rey	Won	

=== Fotogramas de Plata ===
Year	Category	Recipient	Result	Ref.
1992	Best Television Performer	Fernando Rey	Won	
1992	Best Television Performer	Alfredo Landa	Nominated	

=== TP de Oro ===
Year	Category	Recipient	Result	Ref.
1992	Best Spanish Drama Series		Won	
1992	Best Actor	Fernando Rey	Nominated	

=== Actors and Actresses Union Awards ===
Year	Category	Recipient	Result	Ref.
1992	Best Television Lead Performance	Fernando Rey	Won	

== Restoration ==
RTVE carried out a digital 4K UHD scanning, remastering and restoration of the series, that was originally recorded on film, and made it available online in RTVE Play and on its Botón Rojo app for 4K Smart TVs in 2020.
