= Miguel Hermoso =

Spanish film director

- Born: 1942 (age 83–84); Granada, Spain
- Occupations: Film director, screenwriter
- Years active: 1976–present

Miguel Hermoso (born 1942) is a Spanish film director and screenwriter. He has directed ten films since 1976. His 2003 film The End of a Mystery won the Golden St. George at the 25th Moscow International Film Festival.

== Selected filmography ==
- Truhanes (1983)
- Marbella (1985)
- Como un relámpago (1997)
- The End of a Mystery (2003)
- Lola, la película (2007)
