= Peralejos de las Truchas =

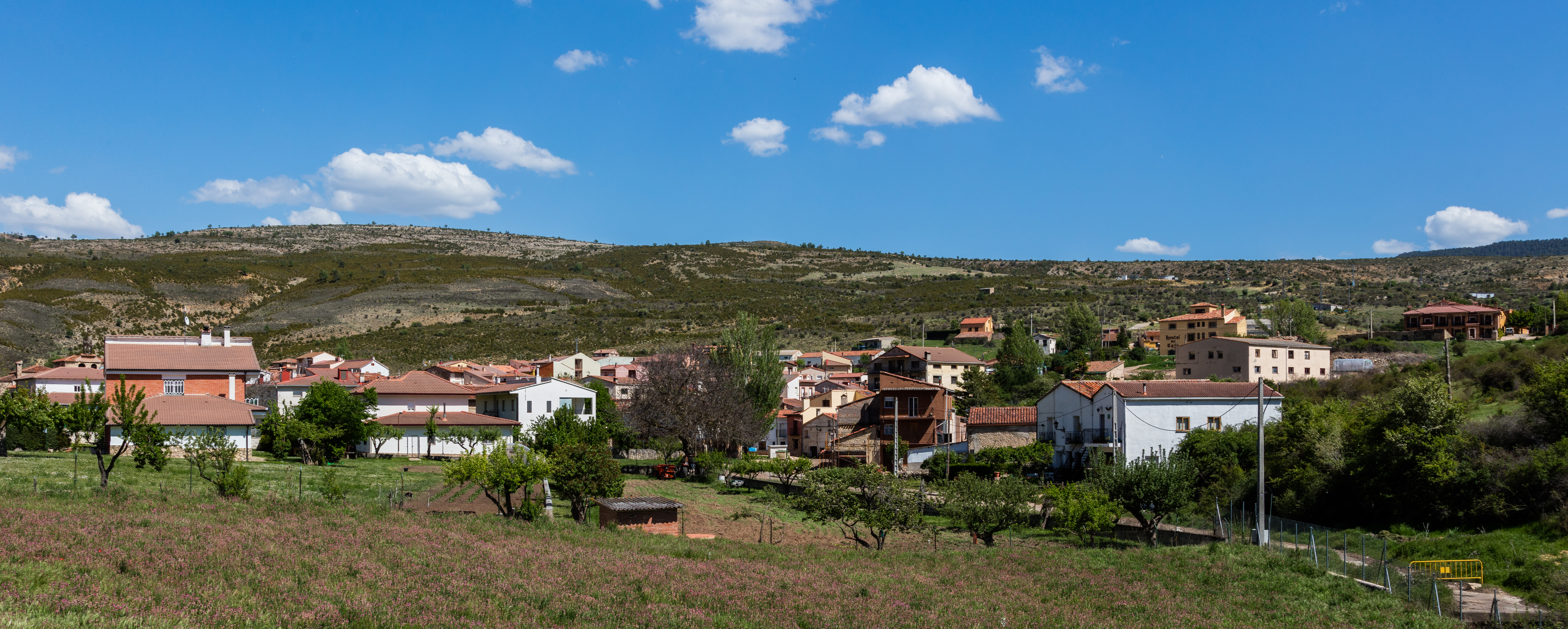

- Location of Peralejos de las Truchas Peralejos de las Truchas (Castilla-La Mancha) Peralejos de las Truchas (Spain)
- Country: Spain
- Autonomous community: Castile-La Mancha
- Province: Guadalajara
- Municipality: Peralejos de las Truchas

Area
  - Total: 70.76 km^{2} (27.32 sq mi)
- Elevation: 1,187 m (3,894 ft)

Population (2025-01-01)
  - Total: 148
  - Density: 2.09/km^{2} (5.42/sq mi)
- Time zone: UTC+1 (CET)
  - Summer (DST): UTC+2 (CEST)

Peralejos de las Truchas is a municipality located in the province of Guadalajara, Castile-La Mancha, Spain. According to the 2004 census (INE), the municipality had a population of 169 inhabitants.
