= José Luis Cuerda =

Spanish film director (1947–2020)

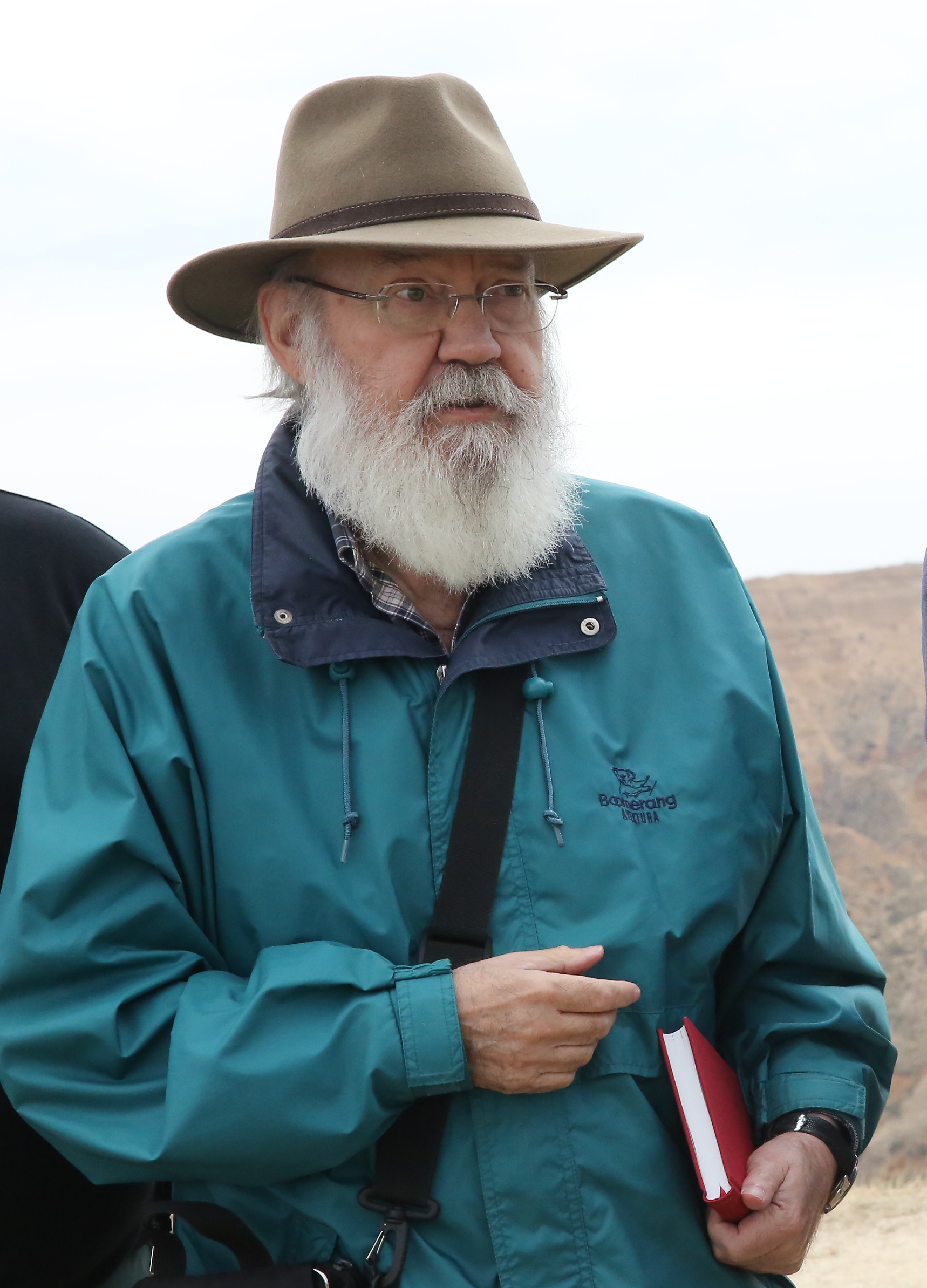
- Cuerda in 2017
- Born: José Luis Cuerda Martínez; 18 February 1947; Albacete, Spain
- Died: 4 February 2020 (aged 72); Madrid, Spain
- Occupation: Filmmaker
- Years active: 1982–2018

José Luis Cuerda Martínez (18 February 1947 – 4 February 2020) was a Spanish filmmaker. He has been recognized for his absurdist films and dramas, including The Enchanted Forest (1987), the cult film Dawn Breaks, Which Is No Small Thing (1989) and Butterfly's Tongue (1999). His films won four Goya Awards: Best Film and Best Original Screenplay for The Enchanted Forest, and Best Adapted Screenplay for Butterfly's Tongue and The Blind Sunflowers (2008).

== Filmography ==
=== Film ===
Year	Title	Director	Writer	Producer	Notes
1982	Pares y nones	Yes	Yes	No	
1987	El bosque animado	Yes	No	No	
1989	Amanece, que no es poco	Yes	Yes	No	
1991	La viuda del capitán Estrada	Yes	Yes	No	
1992	La marrana	Yes	Yes	No	
1993	Tocando fondo	Yes	Yes	No	
1995	Así en el cielo como en la tierra	Yes	Yes	No	
1999	Butterfly's Tongue	Yes	No	Executive	
2000	Primer amor	Yes	Yes	No	Short film
2006	The Education of Fairies	Yes	Yes	No	
2008	The Blind Sunflowers	Yes	Yes	Yes	
2012	Todo es silencio	Yes	No	No	
2018	Tiempo después	Yes	Yes	No	Based on his eponymous 2015 novel. Cuerda's final film

=== Acting roles ===
Year	Title	Role	Notes
1980	El hombre de moda	Pablo	
1981	Demasida para Gálvez	El tuno	
1982	Pares y nones	Visitante de la exposición	Uncredited
1991	El Rey Pasmado	Dominico	
1992	La marrana	Impresor	
1993	Y creo en el nombre del padre		Short film
1996	Thesis	Profesor 1	
2006	The Education of Fairies	Edil	Uncredited
2012	Todo es silencio	Grimaldo	

==== Producer only ====
- Thesis (1996) (Executive Producer, Producer)
- Open Your Eyes (1997) (Producer)
- The Others (2001) (Producer)

=== Documentary ===
- ¡Hay motivo! (2004) (Segment: "Por el mar corre la liebre")
- Ribeiros do Avia (2010)

=== Television ===
Year	Title	Director	Writer	Notes
1975	Cultura 2	Yes	No	TV talking show Directed 1 episode
1977	Mala racha	Yes	Yes	TV Movie
1977	El túnel	Yes	No	TV Movie
1979	Escrito en America	Yes	No	TV Series
1983	Total	Yes	Yes	TV medium-length film
1997	Makinavaja	Yes	Yes	TV Series; Directed 13 episodes and wrote 3 episodes
