= List of Spanish films of 2000 =

A list of Spanish-produced and co-produced feature films released in Spain in 2000. When applicable, the domestic theatrical release date is favoured.

== Films ==
Release		Title (Domestic title)	Cast & Crew	Ref.
J A N U A R Y	14	Second Skin (Segunda piel)	Director: Gerardo Vera Cast: Javier Bardem, Jordi Mollá, Ariadna Gil, Cecilia Roth	
J A N U A R Y	14	Marta and Surroundings (Marta y alrededores)	Director: Nacho Pérez de la Paz, Jesús Ruiz Cast: Marta Belaustegui, Tristán Ulloa, Lola Dueñas, Sergi Calleja	
J A N U A R Y	21	Heart of the Warrior (El corazón del guerrero)	Director: Daniel Monzón Cast: Fernando Ramallo, Neus Asensi, Joel Joan, Santiago Segura, Javier Aller, Adrià Collado	
F E B R U A R Y	4	Asphalt (Asfalto)	Director: Daniel Calparsoro Cast: Najwa Nimri, Juan Diego Botto, Gustavo Salmerón	
F E B R U A R Y	11	Cascabel	Director: Daniel Cebrián Cast: Irene Visedo, Pilar Punzano, Antonio Dechent, Chete Lera, Javier Albalá, Aitor Merino, José Coronado	
F E B R U A R Y	25	Jara	Director: Manuel Estudillo Cast: Olivia Molina, Sergio Peris-Mencheta, Kiti Manver, Chete Lera, María Isbert, Javier Gurruchaga, Juan Echanove, Ángela Molina	
M A R C H	31	Yoyes	Director: Helena Taberna Cast: Ana Torrent, Ernesto Alterio, Florence Pernel	
M A R C H	31	The Art of Dying (El arte de morir)	Director: Álvaro Fernández Armero Cast: Fele Martínez, María Esteve, Gustavo Salmerón, Adrià Collado, Lucía Jiménez, Elsa Pataky, Sergio Peris-Mencheta	
A P R I L	7	I Know Who You Are (Sé quién eres)	Director: Patricia Ferreira Cast: Ana Fernández, Miguel Ángel Solá, Roberto Enríquez, Ingrid Rubio, Héctor Alterio	
A P R I L	14	The Sea (El mar)	Director: Agustí Villaronga Cast: Roger Casamajor, Bruno Bergonzini, Antonia Torrens, Juli Mira, Simón Andreu, Ángela Molina, Hernán González, Nilo Mur, David Lozano	
M A Y	12	The Winter of the Fairies (El invierno de las anjanas)	Director: Pedro Telechea Cast: Eduardo Noriega, Elena Anaya, Juan Diego	
J U N E	2	The Waiting List (Lista de espera)	Director: Juan Carlos Tabío Cast: Vladimir Cruz, Thaimi Alvariño, Jorge Perugorría, Saturnino García, Alina Rodríguez, Antonio Valero	(Note: Co-production Spain–France–Cuba–Mexico (50%–20%–20%–10%).)
J U N E	16	Nico and Dani (Krámpack)	Director: Cesc Gay Cast: Fernando Ramallo, Jordi Vilches, Marieta Orozco, Esther Nubiola, Chisco Amado, Ana Gracia, Myriam Mézières	
J U N E	23	Once Upon Another Time (Era outra vez/Érase otra vez)	Director: Juan Pinzás Cast: Monti Castiñeiras, Pilar Saavedra, Vicente de Souza, Mara Sánchez, Víctor Mosqueira, Isabel Vallejo, Marcos Orsi, Antón Reixa	
J U N E	30	Captain Pantoja and the Special Services (Pantaleón y las visitadoras)	Director: Francisco J. Lombardi Cast:Salvador del Solar, Angie Cepeda, Pilar Bardem, Tatiana Astengo	
J U L Y	7	Goodbye from the Heart (Adiós con el corazón)	Director: José Luis García Sánchez Cast: Juan Luis Galiardo, Laura Ramos, Jesús Bonilla, Neus Asensi, Juan Echanove, María Luisa San José, Teresa Gimpera, Aurora Bautista	
J U L Y	14	Mirka	Director: Rachid Benhadj Cast: Vanessa Redgrave	(Note: Co-production Spain–France–Italy (10%–30%–60%).)
J U L Y	30	Km. 0	Director: Yolanda García Serrano & Juan Luis Iborra Cast: Concha Velasco, Georges Corraface, Silke, Carlos Fuentes, Mercè Pons, Alberto San Juan, Elisa Matilla, Armando del Río, Miquel García, Jesús Cabrero, Víctor Ullate Jr, Cora Tiedra, Roberto Álamo, Tristán Ulloa	
A U G U S T	11	The Year of Maria (Año mariano)	Director: Fernando Guillén Cuervo & Karra Elejalde Cast: Karra Elejalde, Fernando Guillén Cuervo, Manuel Manquiña, Gloria Muñoz, Sílvia Bel	
A U G U S T	25	Saint Bernard (San Bernardo)	Director: Joan Potau Cast: Alberto San Juan, Patricia Velásquez, Ana Risueño, Lina Mira, Balbina del Rosario	
S E P T E M B E R	1	Leo	Director: José Luis Borau Cast: Icíar Bollaín, Valeri Jlevinski, Luis Tosar, José Gómez, Rosana Pastor, Charo Soriano	
S E P T E M B E R	1	Burnt Money (Plata quemada)	Director: Marcelo Piñeyro Cast: Eduardo Noriega, Leonardo Sbaraglia, Pablo Echarri	
S E P T E M B E R	1	Gitano	Director: Manuel Palacios Cast: Joaquín Cortés, Laetitia Casta	
S E P T E M B E R	8	The Goalkeeper (El portero)	Director: Gonzalo Suárez Cast: Carmelo Gómez, Maribel Verdú, Antonio Resines, Elvira Mínguez, Eduard Fernández	
S E P T E M B E R	29	La comunidad	Director: Álex de la Iglesia Cast: Carmen Maura, Emilio Gutiérrez Caba, Terele Pávez, Sancho Gracia, María Asquerino, Jesús Bonilla, Marta Fernández-Muro, Eduardo Antuña, Paca Gabaldón, Manuel Tejada, Kiti Manver, Enrique Villén, Ramón Barea, Mariví Bilbao, Luis Tosar, Antonio de la Torre	
S E P T E M B E R	29	Plenilune (Plenilunio)	Director: Imanol Uribe Cast: Miguel Ángel Solá, Adriana Ozores, Juan Diego Botto, Chete Lera, Charo López, Fernando Fernán Gómez	
O C T O B E R	6	Fugitives (Fugitivas)	Director: Miguel Hermoso Cast: Laia Marull, Beatriz Coronel, Juan Diego, María Galiana, Miguel Hermoso, Roberto Cairo, Jesús Olmedo, Niña Pastori	
O C T O B E R	11	Living It Up (La gran vida)	Director: Antonio Cuadri Cast: Salma Hayek, Carmelo Gómez	
O C T O B E R	11	The Other Side (El otro barrio)	Director: Salvador García Ruiz Cast: Àlex Casanovas, Jorge Alcázar, Pepa Pedroche, Alberto Ferreiro, Empar Ferrer, Mónica López, Guillermo Toledo, Joaquín Climent	
O C T O B E R	20	Pellet (El bola)	Director: Achero Mañas Cast: Juan José Ballesta, Pablo Galán, Alberto Jiménez, Manuel Morón, Ana Wagener, Nieve de Medina, Gloria Muñoz, Javier Lago, Omar Muñoz, Soledad Osorio	
O C T O B E R	27	You're the One (Una historia de entonces)	Director: José Luis Garci Cast: Lydia Bosch, Ana Fernández, Julia Gutiérrez Caba, Manuel Lozano, Iñaki Miramón, Juan Diego, Jesús Puente, Fernando Guillén, Marisa de Leza, Carlos Hipólito	
O C T O B E R	27	Masterpiece (Obra maestra)	Director: David Trueba Cast: Ariadna Gil, Santiago Segura, Pablo Carbonell, Luis Cuenca, Loles León, Jesús Bonilla	
O C T O B E R	27	Clams and Mussels (Almejas y mejillones)	Director: Marcos Carnevale Cast: Jorge Sanz, Leticia Brédice, Loles León, Antonio Gasalla, Silke	
N O V E M B E R	3	Friends Have Reasons (Las razones de mis amigos)	Director: Gerardo Herrero Cast: Marta Belaustegui, Joel Joan, Sergi Calleja, Lola Dueñas, José Tomé, Paz Gómez, Jorge de Juan, Roberto Enríquez, Víctor Clavijo, Ricardo Moya, Ana Duato	
N O V E M B E R	3	Fill Me with Life (Báilame el agua)	Director: Josecho San Mateo Cast: Unax Ugalde, Pilar López de Ayala, Juan Díaz	
N O V E M B E R	3	Lázaro de Tormes	Director: José Luis García Sánchez & Fernando Fernán Gómez Cast: Rafael Álvarez "El Brujo", Karra Elejalde, Beatriz Rico, Manuel Alexandre, Agustín González, Francisco Rabal, Francisco Algora, Juan Luis Galiardo, Manuel Lozano, Tina Sainz	
N O V E M B E R	17	Miserable Life (Terca vida)	Director: Fernando Huertas Cast: Santiago Ramos, Luisa Martín, Manuel Alexandre, Jorge Bosch, Juan Jesús Valverde, Encarna Paso, Lola Dueñas	
D E C E M B E R	1	Kisses for Everyone (Besos para todos)	Director: Jaime Chávarri Cast: Emma Suárez, Eloy Azorín, Roberto Hoyas, Chusa Barbero, Iñaki Font, Pilar López de Ayala	
D E C E M B E R	22	¡Ja me maaten...!	Director: Juan A. Muñoz Cast: Juan A. Muñoz, Enrique Villén, José Carabias	

== Box office ==
The ten highest-grossing Spanish films in 2000, by domestic box office gross revenue, are as follows:

Highest-grossing films of 2000
Rank	Title	Distributor	Admissions	Domestic gross (€)
1	Common Wealth (La comunidad)	Lolafilms	1,382,216	5,825,941
2	The Year of Maria (Año mariano)	Aurum	1,376,493	5,354,196
3	The Art of Dying (El arte de morir)	Aurum	818,241	3,234,057
4	All About My Mother (Todo sobre mi madre) ‡	Warner Sogefilms	671,677	2,597,138
5	You're the One	Columbia TriStar	550,165	2,375,746
6	Second Skin (Segunda piel)	Lolafilms	546,089	2,182,748
7	Nobody Knows Anybody (Nadie conoce a nadie) ‡	Warner Sogefilms	487,533	1,838,212
8	I Will Survive (Sobreviviré) ‡	Aurum	390,201	1,461,197
9	Alone (Solas) ‡	Nirvana Films	386,157	1,507,499
10	Lista de espera (Lista de espera)	Alta Films	360,145	1,525,883
‡: 1999 theatrical opening

== See also ==
- 15th Goya Awards
