= 15th Goya Awards =

- Date: 3 February 2001
- Site: Palacio Municipal de Congresos de Madrid
- Hosted by: María Barranco and José Coronado; Loles León and Imanol Arias; Concha Velasco and Pablo Carbonell

Highlights
- Best Film: Pellet
- Best Actor: Juan Luis Galiardo; Goodbye from the Heart
- Best Actress: Carmen Maura; Common Wealth
- Most awards: You're the One (5)
- Most nominations: Common Wealth (15)

Television coverage
- Network: TVE

The 15th Goya Awards were presented in Madrid, Spain on 3 February 2001.

Pellet won the award for Best Film.

== Winners and nominees ==
Best Film: Pellet; Common Wealth; Leo; You're the One	Best Director: José Luis Borau – Leo; Álex de la Iglesia – Common Wealth; Jaime Chávarri – Kisses for Everyone; José Luis Garci – You're the One
Best Actor: Juan Luis Galiardo – Goodbye from the Heart; Juan Diego Botto – Plenilune; Carmelo Gómez – The Goalkeeper; Miguel Ángel Solá – I Know Who You Are	Best Actress: Carmen Maura – Common Wealth; Icíar Bollaín – Leo; Lydia Bosch – You're the One; Adriana Ozores – Plenilune
Best Supporting Actor: Emilio Gutiérrez Caba – Common Wealth; Luis Cuenca – Masterpiece; Juan Diego – You're the One; Iñaki Miramón – You're the One	Best Supporting Actress: Julia Gutiérrez Caba – You're the One; Chusa Barbero – Kisses for Everyone; Ana Fernández – You're the One; Terele Pávez – Common Wealth
Best Original Screenplay: Verónica Fernández, Achero Mañas – Pellet; Jorge Guerricaechevarría, Álex de la Iglesia – Common Wealth; José Luis Borau – Leo; José Luis Garci, Horacio Valcárcel – You're the One	Best Adapted Screenplay: Fernando Fernán Gómez – Lázaro de Tormes; Manuel Hidalgo, Gonzalo Suárez – The Goalkeeper; Tomàs Aragay, Cesc Gay – Nico and Dani; Salvador García Ruiz – The Other Side
Best New Actor: Juan José Ballesta – Pellet; Javier Batanero – Leo; Pablo Carbonell – Masterpiece; Jordi Vilches – Nico and Dani	Best New Actress: Laia Marull – Fugitives; Pilar López de Ayala – Kisses for Everyone; Luisa Martín – Miserable Life; Antònia Torrens – The Sea
Best Spanish Language Foreign Film: Burnt Money (Argentina); Captain Pantoja and the Special Services (Peru); Ratas, ratones, rateros (Ecuador); The Waiting List (Cuba)	Best European Film: Dancer in the Dark (Denmark/Sweden); Chicken Run (UK); East Is East (UK); Faithless (Sweden)
Best New Director: Achero Mañas – Pellet; Patricia Ferreira – I Know Who You Are; Cesc Gay – Nico and Dani; Daniel Monzón – Heart of the Warrior	Best Animated Film: La isla del cangrejo; 10+2: el gran secreto; El ladrón de sueños; Marco Antonio. Rescate en Hong Kong
Best Cinematography: Raúl Pérez Cubero – You're the One; José Luis López-Linares – Calle 54; Kiko de la Rica – Common Wealth; Gonzalo F. Berridi – Plenilune; Jaume Peracaula – The Sea	Best Editing: Miguel González Sinde – You're the One; Carmen Frías – Calle 54; Alejandro Lázaro – Common Wealth; José Salcedo – Leo
Best Art Direction: Gil Parrondo – You're the One; José Luis Arrizabalaga, Biaffra – Common Wealth; Fernando Sáenz, Ulia Loureiro – Kisses for Everyone; Luis Ramírez – Lázaro de Tormes	Best Production Supervision: Luis María Delgado – You're the One; Juanma Pagazaurtundua – Common Wealth; Tino Pont – Heart of the Warrior; Carmen Martínez – Lázaro de Tormes
Best Sound: Thom Cadley, Mark Wilder, Pierre Gamet, Martin Gamet, Dominique Hennequin, Marisa Hernández – Calle 54; Daniel Goldstein, Ricardo Steinberg, Sergio Burman, Jaime Fernández – Pellet; Antonio Rodríguez 'Mármol', Jaime Fernández, James Muñoz, José Vinader – Common Wealth; Gilles Ortion, Ray Guillon, James Muñoz – Plenilune	Best Special Effects: Félix Bergés, Raúl Romanillos, Pau Costa, Julio Navarro – Common Wealth; Emilio Ruiz del Río, Alfonso Nieto, Raúl Romanillos, Pau Costa – Masterpiece; Reyes Abades, Félix Bergés – The Art of Dying; Juan Ramón Molina, Alfonso Nieto – The Year of Maria
Best Costume Design: Javier Artiñano – Lázaro de Tormes; Francisco Delgado – Common Wealth; Pedro Moreno – Kisses for Everyone; Gumersindo Andrés – You're the One	Best Makeup and Hairstyles: Romana González, Josefa Morales – Kisses for Everyone; José Quetglás, Mercedes Guillot Common Wealth –; Juan Pedro Hernández, Esther Martín Lázaro de Tormes –; Paca Almenara, Antonio Panizza You're the One –
Best Original Score: José Nieto – I Know Who You Are; Roque Baños – Common Wealth; Carlos Jean, Nacho Mastretta, Najwa Nimri – Asfalto; Antonio Meliveo – Plenilune	Best Original Song: "Fugitivas" by Manuel Malou – Fugitives; "El arte de morir" by A. Pérez, Suso Sáiz, Cristina Lliso and Tito Fargo – The Art of Dying; "Gitano" by Arturo Pérez-Reverte and Abigail Marcet– Gitano; "Km. 0" by Ismael Serrano – Km. 0
Best Short Film: Pantalones; El beso de la tierra; Los almendros - Plaza Nueva; El puzzle; The Raven... Nevermore

== Honorary Goya ==
- José Luis Dibildos
