= 14th European Film Awards =

2001 film awards ceremony in Germany

- Date: December 1, 2001
- Site: Tempodrom, Berlin, Germany
- Hosted by: Mel Smith
- Organized by: European Film Academy

Highlights
- Best Picture: Amélie
- Best Direction: Jean-Pierre Jeunet; Amélie
- Best Actor: Ben Kingsley; Sexy Beast
- Best Actress: Isabelle Huppert; The Piano Teacher
- Most awards: Amélie (4)
- Most nominations: Amélie (7)

Television coverage
- Channel: Arte

The 14th European Film Awards were presented on December 1, 2001 in Berlin, Germany. The winners were selected by the members of the European Film Academy.

== Awards ==
=== Best Film ===
English title	Original title	Director	Country
Amélie	Le Fabuleux Destin d'Amélie Poulain	Jean-Pierre Jeunet	France
Bridget Jones's Diary		Sharon Maguire	United Kingdom
The Experiment	Das Experiment	Oliver Hirschbiegel	Germany
Intimacy		Patrice Chéreau	France, Italy
Italian for Beginners	Italiensk for begyndere	Lone Scherfig	Denmark
The Piano Teacher	La Pianiste	Michael Haneke	France, Austria
The Son's Room	La stanza del figlio	Nanni Moretti	Italy, France
The Others		Alejandro Amenábar	Spain

=== Best Director ===
Nominee	English title	Original title
Jean-Pierre Jeunet	Amélie	Le Fabuleux Destin d'Amélie Poulain
Péter Gothár	Passport	Paszport
Eric Rohmer	The Lady and the Duke	L'Ainglaise et le duc
Ermanno Olmi	The Profession of Arms	Il mestiere delle armi
Francois Ozon	Under the Sand	Sous le sable
José Luis Garci	You're the One	Una historia de entonces

=== Best Screenwriter ===
Nominee(s)	English title	Original title
Danis Tanović	No Man's Land	Ničija zemlja
Achero Mañas	Pellet	El bola
Michael Haneke	The Piano Teacher	La Pianiste
Jean-Louis Milesi and Robert Guédiguian	The Town Is Quiet	La Ville est tranquille
Robin Campillo and Laurent Cantet	Time Out	L'emploi du temps
Ettore Scola, Silvia Scola, Furio Scarpelli, and Giacomo Scarpelli	Unfair Competition	Concorrenza sleale

=== Best Actor ===
Nominee(s)	English title	Original title
Ben Kingsley	Sexy Beast	
Michel Piccoli	I'm Going Home	Vou para casa
David Hemmings, Michael Caine, Ray Winstone, Tom Courtenay, and Bob Hoskins	Last Orders	
Branko Đurić	No Man's Land	Ničija zemlja
Stellan Skarsgård	Taking Sides	Der Fall Furtwängler
Jesper Christensen	The Bench	Bænken

=== Best Actress ===
Nominee	English title	Original title
Isabelle Huppert	The Piano Teacher	La Pianiste
Audrey Tautou	Amélie	Le Fabuleux Destin d'Amélie Poulain
Stefania Sandrelli	The Last Kiss	L'ultimo bacio
Laura Morante	The Son's Room	La stanza del figlio
Ariane Ascaride	The Town Is Quiet	La Ville es tranquille
Charlotte Rampling	Under the Sand	Sous le sable

=== Best Documentary ===
English title	Original title	Director(s)	Country
Black Box BRD		Andres Veiel	Germany
Casting		Emmanuel Finkiel	France
Elegy of a Voyage	Элегия дороги	Alexander Sokurov	Russia
Cool & Crazy	Heftig og begeistret	Knut Erik Jensen	Sweden
The Idle Ones	Joutilaat	Susanna Helke and Virpi Suutari	Finland
Super 8 Stories	Супер 8 Прича	Emir Kusturica	Germany, Italy, Yugoslavia

=== European Discovery ===
English title	Original title	Director	Country
Pellet	El bola	Achero Mañas	Spain
alaska.de		Esther Gronenborn	Germany
The Sea That Thinks	De zee die denkt	Gert de Graaff	Netherlands
Dog Days	Hundstage	Ulrich Seidl	Austria
Jalla! Jalla!		Josef Fares	Sweden
Dead End Streets	Κλειστοί δρόμοι	Stavros Ioannou	Greece
Last Resort		Paweł Pawlikowski	United Kingdom
Lovely Rita		Jessica Hausner	Austria, Germany
The Chimp	Маймыл	Aktan Abdykalykov	Kyrgyzstan, Russia, France, Japan
Happy Man	Szczęśliwy człowiek	Małgorzata Szumowska	Poland

=== Best Non-European Film ===
English title	Original title	Director	Country
Moulin Rouge!		Baz Luhrmann	Australia, United States
Baran	باران	Majid Majidi	Iran
Lagaan		Ashutosh Gowariker	India
Monsoon Wedding		Mira Nair	United Kingdom, United States, India
The Believer		Henry Bean	United States

=== Best Cinematographer ===
Nominee	English title	Original title
Bruno Delbonnel	Amélie	Le Fabuleux Destin d'Amélie Poulain
Éric Gautier	Intimacy	Intimité
Tamás Babos	Passport	Paszport
Frank Griebe	The Princess and the Warrior	Der Krieger und die Kaiserin
Fabio Olmi	The Profession of Arms	Il mestiere delle armi
Rein Kotov	The Heart of the Bear	Karu süda
