= Masterpiece (2000 film) =

- Theatrical release poster
- Spanish: Obra maestra
- Directed by: David Trueba
- Screenplay by: David Trueba
- Produced by: Cristina Huete
- Starring: Ariadna Gil; Santiago Segura; Pablo Carbonell; Luis Cuenca; Loles León; Jesús Bonilla
- Cinematography: Javier Aguirresarobe
- Edited by: Pablo G. del Amo
- Music by: Roque Baños
- Production companies: Fernando Trueba PC; Buenavida Producciones
- Distributed by: Lolafilms
- Release date: 27 October 2000
- Country: Spain
- Language: Spanish

Masterpiece (Spanish: Obra maestra) is a 2000 Spanish comedy film directed and written by David Trueba. It stars Ariadna Gil, Santiago Segura, and Pablo Carbonell.

== Plot ==
The plot tracks two male friends, a film director and a wannabe leading man, preparing a musical film, intended to star Amanda Castro, a Spanish cinema diva at a low ebb. Upon the rejection from the latter, the two friends kidnap Castro and force her to star in the film.

== Cast ==
- Ariadna Gil as Amanda Castro
- Santiago Segura as Benito Cañaveras
- Pablo Carbonell as Carolo Suárez Perales
- Loles León as Catalina
- Luis Cuenca as Damián
- Jesús Bonilla
- Joserra Cadiñanos
- Manolo Codeso
- Ana María Barbany
- Concha Redondo
- Anabel Labrador

== Production ==
The film was produced by Fernando Trueba PC and Buenavida producciones, with the participation of TVE, Vía Digital and Amiguetes Entertainment. Shooting locations included the mountains of the Madrid region.

== Release ==
The screenplay was penned by David Trueba. Owing to superficial similarities of the plot with Cecil B. Demented's, lawyers representing the latter film threatened to take legal measures. Distributed by Lolafilms, the film was theatrically released in Spain on 27 October 2000. It grossed €1,056,713 (249,699 admissions).

== Reception ==
Jonathan Holland of Variety considered that despite being "dangerously straddled between genres in a way that could confuse audiences" the film "manages to be moving, funny and thought-provoking".

The review in Fotogramas rated the film 2 out of 5 stars drawing out Santiago Segura's character ("simply superb") as a man evicted from reality, as the best thing about the film while considering that there are too many characters who contribute nothing as the worst element of the film.

== Accolades ==
Year	Award	Category	Nominee(s)	Result	Ref.
2001	15th Goya Awards	Best Supporting Actor	Luis Cuenca	Nominated	
2001	15th Goya Awards	Best New Actor	Pablo Carbonell	Nominated	
2001	15th Goya Awards	Best Special Effects	Emilio Ruiz del Río, Alfonso Nieto, Raúl Romanillos, Pau Costa	Nominated	

== See also ==
- List of Spanish films of 2000
