= Goodbye from the Heart =

- Theatrical release poster
- Spanish: Adiós con el corazón
- Directed by: José Luis García Sánchez
- Screenplay by: Rafael Azcona; José Luis García Sánchez
- Starring: Juan L. Galiardo; Laura Ramos; Jesús Bonilla; Neus Asensi; Juan Echanove; María Luisa San José; Teresa Gimpera; Aurora Bautista
- Cinematography: Alfredo Mayo
- Edited by: Pablo G. del Amo
- Music by: Carmelo Bernaola
- Production companies: Alma Ata International Pictures; Galiardo Producciones; Gaila; Rafael Azcona
- Distributed by: Alta Films
- Release dates: 27 May 2000 (Málaga); 7 July 2000 (Spain)
- Country: Spain
- Language: Spanish

Goodbye from the Heart (Spanish: Adiós con el corazón) is a 2000 Spanish comedy film directed by José Luis García Sánchez and written by García Sánchez and Rafael Azcona. It stars Juan Luis Galiardo, with Laura Ramos, Jesús Bonilla, and Neus Asensi in supporting roles.

== Plot ==
Women still find middle-aged rogue Juan alluring. Upon the inrush of Juan's purported daughter Caty (an athlete from Cuba), and the rejection by his last "love conquest" Paulina, Juan blackmails the latter's husband Pozueta, a corrupt businessman.

== Cast ==
- Juan Luis Galiardo as Juan
- Laura Ramos as Caty
- Jesús Bonilla as Pozueta
- Neus Asensi as Carmela
- Juan Echanove as Pepe
- María Luisa San José as Paulina
- Teresa Gimpera as Alicia
- Aurora Bautista as marquesa
- Teté Delgado as Noelia
- Pedro Miguel Martínez as Tony

== Production ==
The film is an Alma Ata International Pictures, Galiardo Producciones, Gaila and Rafael Azcona production, with the participation of Antena 3 and Canal+.

== Release ==
The film was presented at the 3rd Málaga Film Festival in May 2000. Distributed by Alta Films, it was released theatrically in Spain on 7 July 2000.

== Reception ==
Casimiro Torreiro of El País wrote that the film "can boast of a solid script, deliver intelligence, humor, tenderness and bad blood".

Jonathan Holland of Variety wrote that, although "pleasant enough in a gentle, rambling way", the film "shows the formula [of García Sánchez] wearing thin.".

== Accolades ==
Year	Award	Category	Nominee(s)	Result	Ref.
2000	3rd Málaga Film Festival	Best Screenplay	Rafael Azcona, Juan Luis Galiardo	Won	
2000	3rd Málaga Film Festival	Best Actor	Juan Luis Galiardo	Won	
2001	15th Goya Awards	Best Actor	Juan Luis Galiardo	Won	

== See also ==
- List of Spanish films of 2000
