= Tuna and Chocolate =

- Spanish: Atún y chocolate
- Directed by: Pablo Carbonell
- Written by: Pablo Carbonell
- Produced by: Antonio P. Pérez
- Starring: Pablo Carbonell; María Barranco; Pedro Reyes; Antonio Dechent; Rosario Pardo
- Cinematography: Álex Catalán
- Edited by: Nacho Ruiz Capillas
- Music by: Nono García
- Production company: Maestranza Films
- Distributed by: Warner Sogefilms
- Release dates: 24 April 2004 (Málaga); 30 April 2004 (Spain)
- Country: Spain
- Language: Spanish

Tuna and Chocolate (Spanish: Atún y chocolate) is a 2004 Spanish comedy film written and directed by Pablo Carbonell, who also stars along with María Barranco and Pedro Reyes.

== Plot ==
Set in an Andalusian fishing village against the backdrop of dwindling fishing resources, the plot follows fisherman Manuel and his pals El Cherif and Perra, as the former's life is upended when his son Manolín says that he wants to have his First Communion, in turn prompting Manolín's mother María to ask Manuel to marry her.

== Cast ==
- Pablo Carbonell as Manuel
- María Barranco as María
- Pedro Reyes as Perra
- Antonio Dechent as El Cherif
- Andrés Rivera as Manolín
- Rosario Pardo as Juani
- Esther Arroyo as bailaora
- Cesáreo Estébanez as padre de María
- Begoña Labrada as bailaora
- Biri as Omar

== Production ==
The film is a Maestranza Films production and it had the association of Indigo Media, the participation of TVE and Canal+, and the collaboration of Junta de Andalucía, Diputación de Cádiz, and Ayuntamiento de Barbate. Shooting locations included Zahara de los Atunes and Barbate.

== Release ==
Tuna and Chocolate was selected in the competitive official lineup of the 7th Málaga Film Festival. Distributed by Warner Sogefilms, it was released theatrically in Spain on 30 April 2004. It also made it to the lineup of the Los Angeles Latino Film Festival.

== Reception ==
Javier Ocaña of El País considered that the film's virtue "is the daring and the constant shunning of political correctness".

Robert Koehler of Variety assessed that Carbonell is up to something "willfully eccentric" with the film, lamenting that he "dawdles while the film slips away from him".

Alberto Bermejo of El Mundo gave Carbonell's directorial debut feature 3 stars, deeming it to be "surprising, in the most positive sense of the word".

== Accolades ==
Year	Award	Category	Nominee(s)	Result	Ref.
2004	7th Málaga Film Festival	Best Actor	Pablo Carbonell	Won	
2005	19th Goya Awards	Best Original Song	"Atunes en el paraíso" by Javier Ruibal	Nominated	

== See also ==
- List of Spanish films of 2004
