= Fugitives (2000 film) =

- Theatrical release poster
- Spanish: Fugitivas
- Directed by: Miguel Hermoso
- Screenplay by: Óscar Plasencia; Raúl Brambilla; Miguel Hermoso
- Produced by: Antonio P. Pérez
- Starring: Laia Marull; Miguel Hermoso Arnao; Roberto Cairo; Jesús Olmedo; María Galiana; Juan Diego; Niña Pastori; Beatriz Coronel
- Cinematography: Tote Trenas
- Edited by: Blanca Guillem
- Music by: Antonio Meliveo
- Production company: Maestranza Films
- Distributed by: Warner Sogefilms
- Release dates: 2 October 2000 (Teatro Cervantes); 6 October 2000 (Spain)
- Country: Spain
- Language: Spanish

Fugitives (Spanish: Fugitivas) is a 2000 Spanish drama road movie directed by Miguel Hermoso from a screenplay by Óscar Plasencia, Raúl Brambilla, and Hermoso. It features Laia Marull, Beatriz Coronel, Miguel Hermoso Arnao, Roberto Cairo, Jesús Olmedo, María Galiana, and Juan Diego.

== Plot ==
The plot tracks the trip from Madrid to Tarifa of two fugitives, young criminal Tony (chased by her former cronies), and Laura, a girl daughter of a prostitute.

== Cast ==
- Laia Marull as Tony
- Beatriz Coronel as Laura
- Miguel Hermoso Arnao as Maxi
- Roberto Cairo as Moco
- Jesús Olmedo as Juanjo
- María Galiana as Ascensión
- Juan Diego as Raimundo
- Silvia Espigado as Flor
- Antonio Dechent as the first police agent
- Jesús Lucena as the second police agent
- Niña Pastori
- Santiago Ramos

== Production ==
The film is a Maestranza Films (Antonio P. Pérez) production, with the participation of Canal Sur and TVV. Shooting locations included Tarifa, Cádiz, El Puerto de Santa María, Chipiona, Los Caños de Meca, Algeciras, Carmona, Puente Genil, and Madrid.

== Release ==
The film received a pre-screening at Málaga's Teatro Cervantes on 2 October 2000. Distributed by Warner Sogefilms, it was released theatrically in Spain on 6 October 2000.

== Reception ==
Jonathan Holland of Variety wrote that the film "balances careful characterization with a solid plot and smart pacing, although the mood is flattened a bit by an uninspiring central perf".

== Accolades ==
Year	Award	Category	Nominee(s)	Result	Ref.
2001	15th Goya Awards	Best New Actress	Laia Marull	Won	
2001	15th Goya Awards	Best Original Song	"Fugitivas" by Manuel Malou, Natboccara, JJ Chaleco	Won	

== See also ==
- List of Spanish films of 2000
