= Abierto 24 horas =

- Genre: Sitcom
- Developed by: Cartel
- Directed by: José Miguel Ganga
- Starring: Pilar Bardem; Beatriz Rico; Santiago Nogués; Juán Khun; Lola Lemos
- Country of origin: Spain
- Original language: Spanish
- No. of seasons: 2
- No. of episodes: 34

Production
- Camera setup: Multi-camera
- Running time: 35 minutes approx.

Original release
- Network: Antena 3
- Release: January 5, 2000 – September 4, 2001

Abierto 24 horas (English: Open 24 hours) was a Spanish sitcom which aired 34 episodes between 2000 and 2001. It was directed by José Miguel Ganga and was aired by Antena 3.

The plot centers on an extravagant commercial establishment called De sol a sol, owned by the Morcillo family.

== Cast ==
- Pilar Bardem
- Luis Merlo
- Santiago Nogués
- Beatriz Rico
- Juán Khun
- Pedro Reyes
- Lola Lemos
- Sonia Jávaga
- José Lifante
