= Miguel y William =

2007 Spanish film by Inés París

- Theatrical release poster
- Directed by: Inés París
- Written by: Inés París
- Story by: Eva Cruz; Inés París; Miguel Ángel Gómez; Tirso Calero
- Produced by: Antonio Saura; José Velasco; Juan Luis Galiardo
- Starring: Elena Anaya; Juan Luis Galiardo; Will Kemp
- Cinematography: Néstor Calvo
- Edited by: Julia Juániz
- Music by: Stephen Warbeck
- Production company: Zebra Producciones
- Distributed by: Warner Bros. Pictures
- Release date: 2 February 2007
- Running time: 100 minutes
- Country: Spain
- Language: Spanish

Miguel y William (transl. Michael and William) is a 2007 Spanish romantic comedy film directed by Inés París and starring Elena Anaya, Juan Luis Galiardo and Will Kemp. The film depicts a fictional meeting between William Shakespeare and Miguel de Cervantes in the early seventeenth century and their rival love for a woman. The dialogue is a mixture of Spanish and English.

== Cast ==
- Elena Anaya - Leonor
- Juan Luis Galiardo - Miguel de Cervantes
- Will Kemp - William Shakespeare
- Josep Maria Pou - Duque
- Geraldine Chaplin - Dueña
- Malena Alterio - Magdalena
- Miriam Giovanelli - Consuelo
- Jorge Calvo - Sancho
- Carolina Lapausa - Juana
- Óscar Hernández - Médico
- José Luis Torrijo - Prior
- Juan Fernández - Iniesta
- Fernando Conde - Padre Leonor
- Roberto Cairo - Cómico director
- María Parra - Petronila
- Javier Aller - Bufón
- Oscar Mayer - Cuidador perros
- Denis Rafter - Vendedor Londres

== See also ==
- List of Spanish films of 2007
