= Juan Margallo =

Spanish actor (1940–2025)

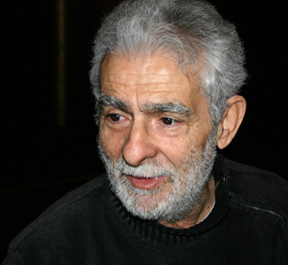
- Margallo in 2002
- Born: Juan Francisco Margallo Rivera; 24 September 1940; Cáceres, Spain
- Died: 2 March 2025 (aged 84); Madrid, Spain
- Education: RESAD
- Occupations: Actor; theater director; dramaturge
- Years active: 1963–2023
- Spouse: Petra Martínez (m. 1968)
- Children: 2

Juan Francisco Margallo Rivera (24 September 1940 – 2 March 2025) was a Spanish actor, theatre director and dramaturge.

Margallo was considered one of the main actors in Spanish theater.

== Life and career ==
He worked with Miguel Narros, Luis Escobar Kirkpatrick and José Tamayo. In 1976, he played Woyzeck, by Georg Büchner, and La sangre y la ceniza, by Alfonso Sastre. He was awarded the prestigious national award 'Premio Nacional de Teatro 2022'.

In 2011, he founded with his spouse, Petra Martínez, the Uroc Teatro, which received the Medalla de Oro al Mérito en las Bellas Artes.

Margallo died from complications of a fall in Madrid, on 2 March 2025, at the age of 84.

== Filmography ==
- Llegar a más (1963)
- Un día más (1963)
- Los buenos samaritanos (1966)
- Los Flamencos (1968) as Pepe
- Una vez al año ser hippy no hace daño (1969)
- ¡¡Se armó el belén!! (1970) as Paquito
- Hay que educar a papá (1971)
- Socrates (1970) as Crizia
- Flor de santidad (1973) as chamarilero
- The Spirit of the Beehive (1973) as fugitivo
- A Dog Called... Vengeance (1977) as cuatrero
- Sus años dorados (1980)
- Dragon Rapide (1986) as marroquí
- El aire de un crimen (1988) as mozo de la bodega
- Demasiado caliente para ti (1996)
- Chevrolet (1997) as Padre Miguel
- El invierno de las anjanas (2000) as Félix
- Año Mariano (2000) as Benito
- El hombre que volaba un poquito (2001)
- Al sur de Granada (2003) as Emiliano
- Noviembre (2003) as Daniel
- Platillos volantes (2003) as Boris
- La promesa (2004) as Roberto
- Solitary Fragments (2007) as Padre Adela
- El prado de las estrellas (2007) as Escobedo
- Azaña (2008)
- Teratoma (2014)
- Hablar (2015) as el actor
- La reina de España (2016) as Juan
- Oblivion Verses (2017) as el hombre de la morgue
- Campeones (2018) as Julio

== Television series ==
- Teatro de siempre (1966–1967)
- Los paladines (1972)
- Estudio 1 (1970–1973) as Alberto / Juan Blaise
- Noche de teatro (1974)
- Cuentos y leyendas (1974)
- Cuentopos (1975) as Mimos
- Las aventuras del hada Rebeca (1976)
- El teatro (1977) as Corchete 1º
- Barrio Sésamo (1979–1980) as Nisi
- Les chevaux du soleil (1980) as Kossaïri
- Ocúpate de Amelia (1984–1985) as Bibichon
- Gatos en el tejado (1988)
- El mundo de Juan Lobón (1989) as Peña
- La forja de un rebelde (1990) as Manzanares
- Andalucía, un siglo de fascinación (1996) as productor
- Querido maestro (1998)
- Ellas son así (1999)
- Petra Delicado (1999) as padre de Luz
- Ana y los 7 (2004)
- Hospital Central (2005) as Damián
- Cuéntame cómo pasó (2009) as Ignacio
- Hispania, la leyenda (2010–2011)
- El don de Alba (2013)
- Apaches (2017) as marido de Rosa

== Bibliography ==
- Trancón, Santiago (2006). Castañuela 70: Esto era España, señores (in Spanish). Madrid: Rama Lama. ISBN 9788493430740. OCLC 892201393.
