= Plenilune =

- Theatrical release poster
- Spanish: Plenilunio
- Directed by: Imanol Uribe
- Screenplay by: Elvira Lindo
- Based on: Plenilunio by Antonio Muñoz Molina
- Produced by: Andrés Santana
- Starring: Miguel Ángel Solá; Adriana Ozores; Juan Diego Botto; Fernando Fernán Gómez; Charo López; Chete Lera; María Galiana
- Cinematography: Gonzalo F. Berridi
- Edited by: Teresa Font
- Music by: Antonio Meliveo
- Production companies: Sogecine; StudioCanal; Canal+ España; Televisión Española; Aiete-Ariane Films; Instituto de la Cinematografía y de las Artes Audiovisuales; Junta of Castile and León
- Distributed by: Warner Sogefilms
- Release dates: September 2000 (San Sebastián); 29 September 2000 (Spain)
- Country: Spain
- Language: Spanish

Plenilune (Spanish: Plenilunio) or Full Moon is a 2000 Spanish film directed by Imanol Uribe and written by Elvira Lindo, consisting of an adaptation of the novel Plenilunio by Antonio Muñoz Molina. It stars Miguel Ángel Solá, Adriana Ozores and Juan Diego Botto alongside Fernando Fernán Gómez, Charo López, Chete Lera and María Galiana.

== Plot ==
Arriving to a sleepy provincial city of northern Spain from the Basque Country, a police inspector with a psychologically damaged wife tracks down (with help from the local coroner) a psychotic misogynist killer of female children, who happens to hate his job as a fishmonger and his family altogether as well. The inspector kindles with Susana Grey, the teacher of a murdered girl, establishing a romantic affair.

== Cast ==
- Miguel Ángel Solá as Inspector
- Adriana Ozores as Susana Grey
- Juan Diego Botto as Asesino
- Fernando Fernán Gómez as Padre Orduña
- Charo López as Carmen
- Chete Lera as Ferreras
- María Galiana as Mujer enlutada
- Noelia Ortega as Paula
- Antonio Muñoz Molina as bedel

== Production ==
The screenplay was penned by Elvira Lindo, adapting the novel by Antonio Muñoz Molina. The film is a Sogecine production. It was shot in Palencia, Castile and León. Produced by Andrés Santana, other crew members included Gonzalo F. Berridi (cinematography) and Teresa Font (editing) and Antonio Meliveo (music). Imanol Uribe said the filming has been very hard for 9-year-old Noelia Ortega, especially in the scenes she shot naked in the river during one of the hardest winters that is remembered in Palencia.

== Release ==
The film was presented in September 2000 at the 48th San Sebastián International Film Festival, screened out of competition. Distributed by Warner Sogefilms, it was theatrically released in Spain on 29 September 2000.

== Reception ==
The screenplay received mixed reviews from critics, whereas the performances earned general acclaim.

== Accolades ==
Year	Award	Category	Nominee(s)	Result	Ref.
2000	47th Ondas Awards	Best Spanish Film		Won	
2000	47th Ondas Awards	Best Actress	Adriana Ozores	Won	
2001	15th Goya Awards	Best Actor	Juan Diego Botto	Nominated	
2001	15th Goya Awards	Best Actress	Adriana Ozores	Nominated	
2001	15th Goya Awards	Best Original Score	Antonio Meliveo	Nominated	
2001	15th Goya Awards	Best Cinematography	Gonzalo "Kalo" F. Berridi	Nominated	
2001	15th Goya Awards	Best Sound	Gilles Ortion, Ray Gillon, James Muñoz	Nominated	
2001	10th Actors Union Awards	Best Film Performance in a Leading Role	Adriana Ozores	Nominated	

== See also ==
- List of Spanish films of 2000
