= The Outcome =

2005 Spanish film

- Directed by: Juan Pinzás
- Written by: Juan Pinzás
- Starring: Carlos Bardem
- Release dates: July 2005 (Moscow); 7 October 2005 (Spain)
- Running time: 105 minutes
- Country: Spain
- Language: Spanish

The Outcome (Spanish: El desenlace) is a 2005 Spanish drama film directed by Juan Pinzás. It is the 31st Dogme 95 film. It was entered into the 27th Moscow International Film Festival. It also won the Jury Special Prize at the New York International Latino Film Festival.

== Cast ==
- Carlos Bardem as Rosendo
- Isabel del Toro
- Fernando Epelde as Paralítico
- Javier Gurruchaga
- Miguel Insua
- Beatriz Rico
- José Rodríguez as Pianista
- Víctor Rueda as Fabio
- José Sancho

== See also ==
- List of Spanish films of 2005
