= Los Toreros Muertos =

Spanish band

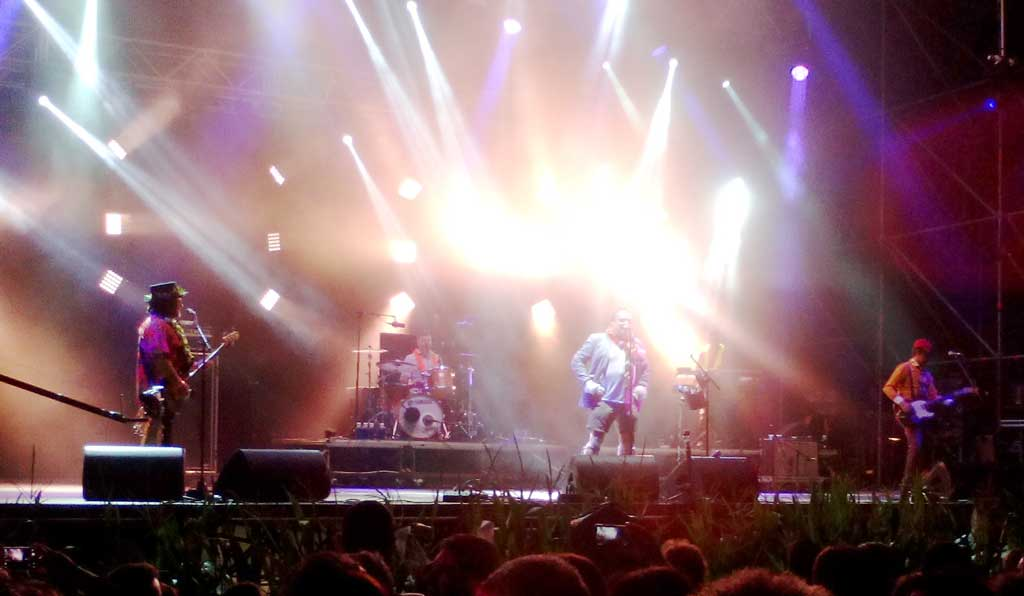
- Los Toreros Muertos, Boimorto in 2016.

Background information
- Origin: Madrid, Spain
- Genres: Rock en español Punk; Pop; Comedy rock
- Years active: 1984-1992, 2007 - today
- Labels: Ariola Records
- Members: Pablo Carbonell (voice); Many Moure (bass); Guillermo Piccolini (keyboard)

Los Toreros Muertos is a musical group of the new wave/power pop/punk movement on the Spanish-speaking music scene known as La Movida Madrileña.

The Spanish singer and humorist Pablo Carbonell with Many Moure and Guillermo Piccolini formed this group in 1984. Their career spanned eight years to its dissolution in 1992. It produced songs for the public that were marked by an individual and irreverent originality and edgy humor.

Their first single was Yo no me llamo Javier. With the gradual relaxation of mores in Spain in the mid-1980s, there was a perceived explosion of out-of-wedlock births. This song was a barbed commentary written from the viewpoint of a young man named Javier accused of fathering a child. It was one of the songs included on their album 30 años de éxitos (Ariola, 1986). On this album, one can perceive the influence of Madness and the Mondragón Orchestra. Also among its songs is Mi agüita amarilla (My Little Yellow Water).

In 1987, they released Por Biafra, its best song being On the Desk which ranks up with any of Madness's delightful song from the horn arrangements to the Music Hall style piano. It was a parody of the English language instruction standard in the Spanish national education system. Another of one the songs on this album, Pilar, also received some airplay.

In 1989, they released their third album, Mundo Caracol. In 1992, they released a greatest hits compilation, Cantan en Español, produced by Piccollini. It included Los Toreros Muertos, Mi Agüita Amarilla, Yo no me llamo Javier, Soy un Animal, and 1789.

Along with Hombres G, Los Rebeldes, and Mecano, Los Toreros Muertos achieved notable cross-over airplay onto the US military radio stations in Rota (see Naval Station Rota, Spain), Torrejon (now Madrid-Torrejón Airport), and Zaragoza (now Zaragoza Airport) that were part of the AFRTS in Europe in the mid-1980s.

After 32 years of no new material, the band released a new album in 2024 called “100.000 copias vendidas en una semana”.
