= The Waves (2011 film) =

2011 Spanish drama film by Alberto Morais

- Directed by: Alberto Morais
- Written by: Alberto Morais; Daniel Martín Sáez de Parayuelo
- Produced by: Marta Figueras; César Martínez Herrada; Alberto Morais
- Starring: Carlos Álvarez-Nóvoa; Laia Marull; Armando Aguirre; Sergio Caballero; Marthe Villalonga
- Cinematography: Joan Benet
- Edited by: Manuel Barriere
- Production company: Olivo Films
- Release date: 2011
- Running time: 95 minutes
- Country: Spain
- Languages: Spanish; Valencian; French

The Waves (Spanish: Las olas) is a 2011 Spanish drama film directed by Alberto Morais, who co-wrote the screenplay with Daniel Martín Sáez de Parayuelo. It stars Carlos Álvarez-Nóvoa as an elderly widower who travels from Valencia to Argelès-sur-Mer in southern France, confronting memories of his internment there after the Spanish Civil War. Laia Marull, Armando Aguirre, Sergio Caballero and Marthe Villalonga also appear in the film.

The film premiered in the main competition of the 33rd Moscow International Film Festival, where it won the Golden George for best film. Álvarez-Nóvoa received the Silver George for best actor, and the film also won the FIPRESCI Prize.

== Plot ==
Following the death of his wife, 80-year-old Miguel sets out alone in his old car on a journey that he has postponed for decades. Travelling from Valencia towards the French border, he intends to return to Argelès-sur-Mer, where he was held as a refugee after fleeing Spain at the end of the Spanish Civil War.

Miguel moves slowly and speaks little. During the journey he tries to contact Fernando, an old friend in Barcelona, and meets Blanca, a woman who helps him continue towards France. The present-day landscape prompts fragmented memories of the war, the Republican retreat and the internment camp. Miguel's return to the beach at Argelès forces him to confront the people and experiences that he lost there.

== Cast ==
- Carlos Álvarez-Nóvoa as Miguel
- Laia Marull as Blanca
- Armando Aguirre as Fernando
- Sergio Caballero
- Marthe Villalonga as Teresa Finkel
- Pepe Galotto
- Juan Manuel Mallen

== Production ==
The Waves was Morais's first fiction feature, following his documentary Un lugar en el cine (2007). Morais described the film as a response to conventional representations of the Civil War in Spanish cinema. He said that he wanted history to function as a character rather than as background scenery and sought to present the events without prescribing a moral position for the audience.

The story centres on the refugees who crossed into France during the Retirada of 1939 and were confined at the internment camp at Argelès-sur-Mer. Morais said that the title refers to an image retained by Miguel: bodies from the camp being cast into the sea and carried back to the shore by the waves. The film was made in Spanish, Valencian and French, and its visual approach uses long takes, restrained performances and the geography of Miguel's journey as central narrative elements. Joan Benet served as cinematographer and Manuel Barriere as editor. Marta Figueras, César Martínez Herrada and Morais produced the film for Olivo Films.

== Release ==
The film had its world premiere in the main competition of the 33rd Moscow International Film Festival in June 2011. It was subsequently screened at the BFI London Film Festival, where it was presented under its international title The Waves. It also screened in the official section of the 2011 Seville European Film Festival and at Film at Lincoln Center's Spanish Cinema Now series in New York. Its Spanish theatrical release followed on 13 January 2012.

== Reception ==
Reviewing the film for Time Out, Geoff Andrew awarded it three out of five stars. He considered the ideas behind its measured, largely wordless road-movie structure promising, but criticised aspects of its camera placement, editing and continuity, and regarded its most imaginative passages as overly indebted to Theo Angelopoulos.

Javier Ocaña of El País described the film as poised between visual poetry and affectation. Although he found its austere methodology excessive, he praised the restrained treatment of the French camps that received Spanish refugees and compared the film's themes and style to The Straight Story and Wild Strawberries. Ángel Munárriz, writing in Público, characterised it as a sad, dry and introspective work. He highlighted the controlled performances by Álvarez-Nóvoa and Marull and praised its conclusion as a reflection on the memory embedded in people and places.

Jonathan Holland of Variety described The Waves as an "admirable feature debut", praising its avoidance of sentimentality and Carlos Álvarez-Novoa's performance, while noting its sparse dialogue and deliberately slow pace.

In her contribution to Sight and Sound's 2011 year-end poll, academic and critic Maria Delgado selected The Waves among the year's notable films and called it the strongest film about the scars of the Spanish Civil War since Ken Loach's Land and Freedom.

== Accolades ==
Year	Award	Category	Recipient(s)	Result	Ref.
2011	33rd Moscow International Film Festival	Golden George for Best Film	The Waves	Won	
2011	33rd Moscow International Film Festival	Silver George for Best Actor	Carlos Álvarez-Nóvoa	Won	
2011	33rd Moscow International Film Festival	FIPRESCI Prize	The Waves	Won	
