= Perras callejeras =

- Directed by: José Antonio de la Loma
- Screenplay by: José Antonio de la Loma
- Starring: Sonia Martínez; Susana Sentis; Teresa Giménez; Gabriel Renom; Martín Garrido; Tony Isbert; Luis Cuenca; Conrado Tortosa
- Cinematography: Alejandro Ulloa
- Music by: Enrique Milián; Mario Balaguer
- Production company: Golden Sun
- Release date: 15 March 1985
- Country: Spain
- Language: Spanish

Perras callejeras is a 1985 Spanish quinqui film written and directed by José Antonio de la Loma. It stars Sonia Martínez, Susana Sentis, and Teresa Giménez.

== Plot ==
Berta, Crista, and Sole, three young marginal women from the fringes, found a criminal gang, carrying out small-scale robberies in the streets of upper-class Pedralbes. They end up pulling a big heist in a club as a vengeance against the owner, the man responsible for Berta's time in prison.

== Cast ==
- Sonia Martínez as Berta
- Teresa Giménez as Crista
- Susana Sentis as Sole
- Martín Garrido as Miguel
- Gabriel Renom as Carlos, "El Guapo"
- Mónica Lucchetti as Luisa
- Luis Cuenca as Don Eulogio
- Micky Suter as Tony

== Release ==
The film was released theatrically in Spain on 15 March 1985.

== See also ==
- List of Spanish films of 1985

== Bibliography ==
- Barroso Pérez, Lucía L (2024). "Las quinquis como protagonistas: sobre la mujer marginal en Perras Callejeras (J. A. de la Loma, 1985)". In Marfil, Laura (ed.). Mujer y Espacio Artístico. Una cuestión de género. Córdoba: Universidad de Córdoba. pp. 161–178. ISBN 978-1-4461-6883-7.
- Comas, Àngel (2003). Diccionari de llargmetratges: el cinema a Catalunnya després del franquisme, 1975-2003. Valls: Cossetània Edicions. ISBN 84-96035-96-4.
- Laborda Barceló, Juan (2020). "Women on the Warpath: Perras callejeras, José Antonio de la Loma (1985)". In González del Pozo, Jorge (ed.). Quinqui Film in Spain. Peripheries of Society and Myths on the Margins. London: Anthem Press. pp. 125–139. ISBN 1-78527-229-2.
