= Miserable Life =

- Theatrical release poster
- Spanish: Terca vida
- Directed by: Fernando Huertas
- Screenplay by: Fernando Huertas; Javier García-Mauriño; Alfonso Cuadrado
- Starring: Santiago Ramos; Luisa Martín; Manuel Alexandre; Jorge Bosch; Juan J. Valverde; Encarna Paso; Pilar Barrera; Lola Dueñas; Clara Lago
- Cinematography: Magí Torruella
- Edited by: Fernando Pardo
- Music by: Miquel Asins Arbó; Antonio Meliveo
- Production companies: Karma Producciones Multimedia; PHF Films; Vía Interactiva
- Distributed by: Tri Pictures
- Release dates: 13 November 2000 (Huelva); 17 November 2000 (Spain)
- Country: Spain
- Language: Spanish

Miserable Life (Spanish: Terca vida) is a 2000 Spanish comedy-drama film directed by Fernando Huertas which stars Santiago Ramos and Luisa Martín alongside Manuel Alexandre, Juan Jesús Valverde, Jorge Bosch, and Lola Dueñas.

== Plot ==
Set in a working-class area of Madrid, around Hortaleza, the plot follows a group of people trying to get through their difficult lives by playing quinielas (football pools), with their fate pending on the result of a FC Barcelona-Villarreal CF fixture.

== Cast ==
- Santiago Ramos as Paco
- Luisa Martín as Julia
- Manuel Alexandre as Andrés
- Jorge Bosch as Angel
- Juan J. Valverde as Juan
- Encarna Paso as Vicky
- Pilar Barrera
- Lola Dueñas as Esther
- Clara Lago as Bea (voice)
- Hugo Silva

== Production ==
The film was produced by Karma Producciones Multimedia, PHF Films, and Vía Interactiva. Shooting locations included Madrid. It boasted a 135 million ₧ budget.

== Release ==
The film premiered at the 26th Huelva Ibero-American Film Festival on 13 November 2000. Distributed by Tri Pictures, it was released theatrically in Spain on 17 November 2000.

== Reception ==
Jonathan Holland of Variety deemed the film to be "a diverting neo-realist excursion into Impossible Dream territory", otherwise featuring "moments of charm and an attractive central idea" but also a "lack of glam".

== Accolades ==
Year	Award	Category	Nominee(s)	Result	Ref.
2001	15th Goya Awards	Best New Actress	Luisa Martín	Nominated	

== See also ==
- List of Spanish films of 2000
