= The Winter of the Fairies =

- Theatrical release poster
- Spanish: El invierno de las anjanas
- Directed by: Pedro Telechea
- Screenplay by: Pedro Telechea; Diego Modino
- Starring: Eduardo Noriega; Elena Anaya; Elvira Mínguez; Juan Margallo; Ana Gracia; Fernando Vivanco; Juan Diego; Antonio Resines
- Cinematography: Ángel Luis Fernández
- Edited by: Luis Villar
- Music by: Mario de Benito
- Production companies: Alma Ata International Pictures; Astrolabio Producciones; Cre-Acción Films
- Release date: 12 May 2000
- Country: Spain
- Language: Spanish

The Winter of the Fairies (Spanish: El invierno de las anjanas) is a 2000 Spanish romantic drama film directed by Pedro Telechea which stars Elena Anaya and Eduardo Noriega.

== Plot ==
Set in the 19th century, the plot follows Cantabrian aristocrat Adelaida, in love with Eusebio, an anti-war anarchist deployed in the War of Cuba and presumed dead. Unwilling to accept her lover's demise, Adelaida is incarcerated in an insane asylum by her family, which otherwise belongs to social and economic milieus identified with a pro-war stance.

== Cast ==
- Elena Anaya as Adelaida
- Eduardo Noriega as Eusebio
- Juan Diego as Germán
- Elvira Mínguez
- Fernando Vivanco
- Ana Gracia
- Antonio Resines
- Juan Margallo

== Production ==
The screenplay was penned by Pedro Telechea and Diego Modino.

== Release ==
Distributed by Nirvana Films, the film was released theatrically in Spain on 12 May 2000.

== Reception ==
Jonathan Holland of Variety wrote that "an implausible plot, shaky pacing and C-grade dialogue quickly combine to throttle the project", scenery and Anaya's "enchanting" screen presence notwithstanding.

== See also ==
- List of Spanish films of 2000
