= Stress Is Three =

Stress is Three
- Spanish promotional poster
- Directed by: Carlos Saura
- Written by: Angelino Fons; Carlos Saura
- Produced by: Elías Querejeta
- Starring: Geraldine Chaplin; Juan Luis Galiardo; Fernando Cebrián
- Cinematography: Luis Cuadrado
- Edited by: Pablo González del Amo
- Music by: Jaime Pérez
- Distributed by: Radio Films S.A.E. S.A.
- Release date: 1968
- Running time: 94 minutes
- Country: Spain
- Language: Spanish

Stress Is Three (Original title: Stress-es tres-tres) is a 1968 Spanish road drama film directed by Carlos Saura. The film stars Geraldine Chaplin and Fernando Cebrián as a troubled married couple. Their marital problems are partially a consequence of Spain's rapidly modernizing consumer society. Saura explains that his film is "the study of the crisis in a seemingly developed society, the crisis of the modern Spaniard who, underneath the new veneer, is still a medieval man, who still has working within him the old taboos and moral repressions from his religious past." The film is experimental in nature, whereby Saura moved away from several of the formulas of his previous two films, Peppermint Frappé and La caza. Saura noted, "At the root of it, I had the sense that in Peppermint Frappé I was very constrained by story and I wanted to unbind myself. So, I made Stress Is Three, Three as a kind of liberation."

== Plot ==
The story takes place over one day. Three people embark together on a car trip from Madrid to Almeria. Fernando (Cebrián) is a successful industrialist. However, he is dismayed that his personal life does not reflect his glittering career. He is insecure about his faltering marriage to Teresa (Chaplin), whom he believes is having an affair with his best friend, Antonio (Galiardo).

== Cast ==
- Geraldine Chaplin as Teresa
- Juan Luis Galiardo as Antonio
- Fernando Cebrián as Fernando
- Porfiria Sanchíz as Tía
- Fernando Sánchez Polack as Guarda
- Humberto Sempere as Niño
- Charo Soriano
