= Leo (2000 film) =

- Theatrical release poster
- Directed by: José Luis Borau
- Written by: José Luis Borau
- Produced by: José Luis Borau
- Starring: Icíar Bollaín; Javier Batanero; Valeri Jlevinski; Luis Tosar; José Gómez; Rosana Pastor; Charo Soriano
- Cinematography: Tomàs Pladevall
- Edited by: José Salcedo
- Music by: Álvaro de Cárdenas
- Production company: El Imán
- Release dates: July 2000 (Moscow); 1 September 2000 (Spain)
- Running time: 86 minutes
- Country: Spain
- Language: Spanish

Leo is a 2000 Spanish drama film, written, directed and produced by José Luis Borau and starring Icíar Bollaín and Javier Batanero. It was nominated for six Goya Awards in 2001, and won the award for Best Director.

== Cast ==
- Icíar Bollaín as Leo
- Javier Batanero as Salva
- Valeri Jlevinski as Gabo
- Rosana Pastor as Merche
- Luis Tosar as Paco
- Charo Soriano as Leonor
- José Gómez
- Jorge Bosch
- Carlos Kaniowsky

== Release ==
Leo entered into the 22nd Moscow International Film Festival. It was released theatrically in Spain on 1 September 2000.

== Reception ==
Jonathan Holland of Variety gave a mixed review to Leo, assessing that "the strangely untidy script" is kept from sinking by "superb perfs", "a thought-provoking central idea and gold-plated professionalism".

== Accolades ==
Year	Award	Category	Nominee(s)	Result	Ref.
2001	15th Goya Awards	Best Film		Nominated	
2001	15th Goya Awards	Best Director	José Luis Borau	Won	
2001	15th Goya Awards	Best Original Screenplay	José Luis Borau	Nominated	
2001	15th Goya Awards	Best Actress	Iciar Bollaín	Nominated	
2001	15th Goya Awards	Best Editing	José Salcedo	Nominated	
2001	15th Goya Awards	Best New Actor	Javier Batanero	Nominated	

== See also ==
- List of Spanish films of 2000
