= Kisses for Everyone =

- Theatrical release poster
- Spanish: Besos para todos
- Directed by: Jaime Chávarri
- Written by: José Ángel Esteban; Carlos López
- Produced by: Gustavo Ferrada
- Starring: Emma Suárez; Eloy Azorín; Roberto Hoyas; Chusa Barbero; Iñaki Font; Pilar López de Ayala
- Cinematography: Hans Burmann
- Edited by: Guillermo Represa
- Music by: Carles Cases
- Production company: Sogecine
- Distributed by: Warner Sogefilms
- Release date: 1 December 2000
- Country: Spain
- Language: Spanish

Kisses for Everyone (Spanish: Besos para todos) is a 2000 Spanish comedy film with drama elements directed by Jaime Chávarri. The cast features Emma Suárez, Eloy Azorín, Roberto Hoyas, Chusa Barbero, Iñaki Font and Pilar López de Ayala, among others.

== Plot ==
Set in 1965 Spain, during the Francoist dictatorship, a trio of privileged male medical students (Ramón, Alfonso and Nicolás) are sent to a house in the province of Cádiz so they prepare for their final exams. Yet instead of studying, debauchery, partying and sex ensue after they meet Vicky and Marian, part-time dancers, part-time hookers.

== Cast ==
- Emma Suárez as Vicky
- Eloy Azorín as Ramón
- Roberto Hoyas as Alfonso
- Chusa Barbero as Marian
- Iñaki Font as Nicolás
- Pilar López de Ayala as Rocío
- Beatriz Bergamín as Perla
- Ana Malaver as Chon
- Mónica Cano as Maruja
- Josu Ormaetxe as Padre Esparza
- Luis Tosar as El Bombilla

== Production ==
The screenplay was penned by José Ángel Esteban and Carlos López based on the Manolo Matji's experiences as a medicine student. Produced by Sogecine, the film was shot in Cádiz.

== Release ==
The film opened in theatres on 1 December 2000.

== Accolades ==
Year	Award	Category	Nominee(s)	Result	Ref.
2001	15th Goya Awards	Best Director	Jaime Chávarri	Nominated	
2001	15th Goya Awards	Best Supporting Actress	Chusa Barbero	Nominated	
2001	15th Goya Awards	Best New Actress	Pilar López de Ayala	Nominated	
2001	15th Goya Awards	Best Art Direction	Fernando Sáenz, Ulía Loureiro	Nominated	
2001	15th Goya Awards	Best Makeup and Hairstyles	Romana González, Josefa Morales	Won	
2001	15th Goya Awards	Best Costume Design	Pedro Moreno	Nominated	
2001	10th Actors and Actresses Union Awards	Best Newcomer	Pilar López de Ayala	Nominated	

== See also ==
- List of Spanish films of 2000
