= Marieta Orozco =

Spanish actress (born 1978)

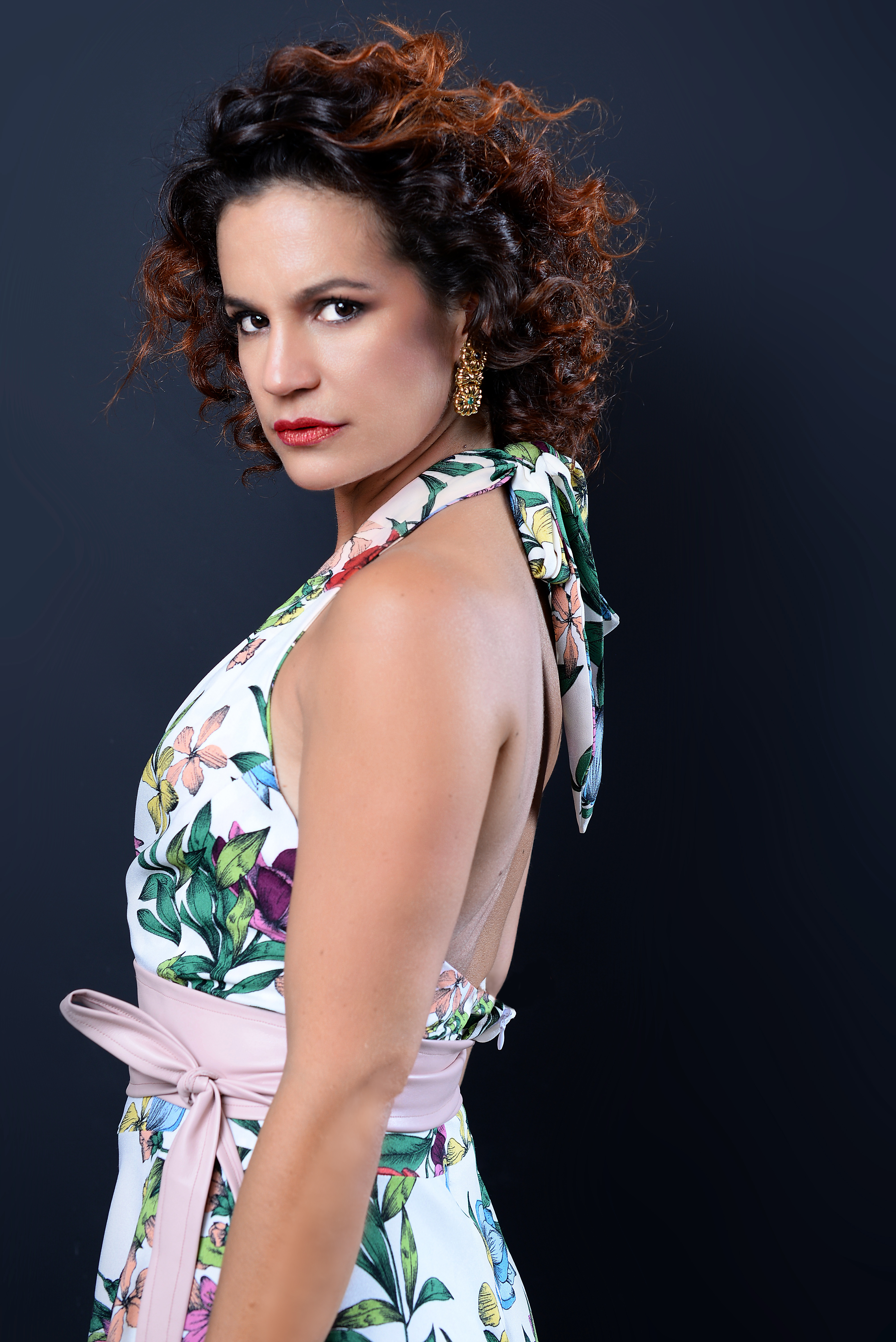
- Orozco in 2018
- Born: February 11, 1978 (age 48); Barcelona, Spain
- Occupation: Actress
- Children: 1
- Awards: Goya Award for Best New Actress (1999)

Marieta Orozco (born 11 February 1978) is a Spanish actress. She won the Goya Award for Best New Actress for her role in Fernando León de Aranoa's Barrio (1998), and went on to appear in films such as Cesc Gay's Krámpack (2000), Marc Recha's Pau i el seu germà (2001) and Adán Aliaga's Estigmas (2009), as well as in the television series Mirall trencat and Cuéntame cómo pasó.

== Early life ==
Marieta Orozco was born in Barcelona on 11 February 1978. Her mother is the actress Alicia Orozco, who later played the mother of Orozco's character in Pau i el seu germà, and her father is Toni Riera, a photographer known for his images of Ibiza's hippy scene. She made her film debut with a small role alongside Carmen Maura and Rosario Flores in Chatarra (1991).

== Career ==
Orozco's breakthrough came in 1998 with Fernando León de Aranoa's Barrio, in which she played Susi. The role won her the Goya Award for Best New Actress, and at the awards ceremony in Madrid in January 1999 her acceptance speech consisted of "No puedo hablar, gracias" ("I can't speak, thank you").

She was one of the leads of Cesc Gay's Krámpack (2000), released in English as Nico and Dani, which won the Youth Prize at the 2000 Cannes Film Festival. In 2001 she appeared in Marc Recha's Pau i el seu germà (Pau and His Brother), which competed at the 2001 Cannes Film Festival, and had a small part as a bar girl in Maurizio Nichetti's Italian comedy Honolulu Baby. In 2003 she played a pregnant woman in Dunia Ayaso and Félix Sabroso's comedy Descongélate!; nine months pregnant herself, she posed nude for the magazine Interviú days before giving birth to her son. Her later film work included Joaquín Oristrell's period comedy Inconscientes (2004), Mireia Ros's El triunfo, an adaptation of Francisco Casavella's novel shot in Barcelona in 2005, Roser Aguilar's first feature Lo mejor de mí (2007), in which she played Silvia and which screened at the Locarno Film Festival. In 2009 she played Sonia in the ensemble drama Mentiras y gordas, released in English as Sex, Party and Lies. That year she also starred opposite shot-put record holder Manolo Martínez in Estigmas, Adán Aliaga's first fiction feature, as a young woman living with a travelling fair. Estigmas screened in the official section of the Valladolid International Film Festival, where it won the Pilar Miró prize, and received a special jury mention at the 2011 Nantes Spanish film festival.

The Goya did not lead to steady work: in 2003 Orozco said she had never had "four scripts to choose from. Not two. Not even after the Goya", and that she had been living on unemployment benefit. She settled in Ibiza, an island she knew from childhood visits to her father, a photographer at the Pachá nightclub, and lived there for eight years. In 2015 she appeared in Second Origin (Segundo origen), directed by Carles Porta from an unfinished project by Bigas Luna.

== Television ==
Orozco appeared in Mirall trencat (2002), TV3's thirteen-episode adaptation of Mercè Rodoreda's novel, scripted by Josep Maria Benet i Jornet, and played the girlfriend of Bart Santana's character in Mujeres (2005), a comedy series made by Dunia Ayaso and Félix Sabroso for Televisión Española. In the tenth season of Cuéntame cómo pasó, when the producers considered reviving the character of Inés Alcántara after Irene Visedo's departure, Orozco played Inés in a single episode in which her face was never shown; the role went to Pilar Punzano from the twelfth season until Visedo returned in the seventeenth.

== Stage work ==
In late 2018 Orozco joined the cast of La Pilarcita, written by María Marull and directed by Chema Tena, at Madrid's Teatro Lara, in a production that had previously featured Anna Castillo. In February 2020 she and Marina Campos Albiol played versions of themselves in Llámame at Madrid's Espacio Gallinero, a comedy about two out-of-work actresses directed by Antonio Hortelano from a text by Sol Aguirre and Paulo García Conde, based on the two performers' own idea.

== Awards ==
- 1999: Goya Award for Best New Actress for Barrio
