= David Selvas =

Spanish actor

- Born: 21 December 1971 (age 54); Barcelona, Spain
- Occupation: Actor
- Years active: 1996–present

David Selvas Jansana (born 21 December 1971) is a Spanish actor. He has appeared in 27 films and television shows since 1996. He starred in the film Pau and His Brother, which was entered into the 2001 Cannes Film Festival.

== Selected filmography ==
- Caresses (1998)
- Pau and His Brother (2001)
- The Invisible Guest (2016)
