= The Other Side (2000 film) =

- Theatrical release poster
- Spanish: El otro barrio
- Directed by: Salvador García Ruiz
- Screenplay by: Salvador García Ruiz
- Based on: El otro barrio by Elvira Lindo
- Produced by: Gerardo Herrero; Javier López Blanco
- Starring: Àlex Casanovas; Jorge Alcázar; Pepa Pedroche; Alberto Ferreiro; Empar Ferrer; Mónica López; Guillermo Toledo; Joaquín Climent
- Cinematography: Teo Delgado
- Edited by: Carmen Frías
- Music by: Pascal Gaigne
- Production company: Tornasol Films
- Distributed by: Alta Films
- Release dates: 24 September 2000 (Zinemaldia); 11 October 2000 (Spain)
- Running time: 130 min
- Country: Spain
- Language: Spanish

The Other Side (Spanish: El otro barrio) is a 2000 Spanish drama film written and directed by Salvador García Ruiz and based on the novel by Elvira Lindo. It stars Àlex Casanovas and Jorge Alcázar.

== Plot ==
Set in Vallecas, the plot follows the vicissitudes of Ramón, a chubby teenager who is involved in a combo of tragedies, unwillingly slicing the jugular of his best friend with the edge of a cockle can, prompting the latter's girlfriend's death by fall from balcony, and ensuing death of another neighbor. While the criminal investigation tries to shed light on the matter, Ramon is taken to a children's home. Via the contact established by Ramón's sister Gloria, Ramón is provided help by Marcelo, a lawyer raised in the hood who has returned to Madrid from Barcelona.

== Cast ==
- Àlex Casanovas as Marcelo
- Jorge Alcázar as Ramón
- Alberto Ferreiro as Aníbal
- Pepa Pedroche as Gloria
- Empar Ferrer as madre de Ramón
- Mónica López as Sara
- Guillermo Toledo as Vicente
- Joaquín Climent as padre de Ramón

== Production ==
García Ruiz's sophomore feature after Mensaka, The Other Side is based on the novel El otro barrio by Elvira Lindo. It was produced by Tornasol Films and it had the participation of Vía Digital. Shooting locations included Vallecas.

== Release ==
The film screened at the 48th San Sebastián International Film Festival in September 2000. Distributed by Alta Films, it was theatrically released in Spain on 11 October 2000. Wild Bunch scooped the international distribution rights.

== Reception ==
David Rooney of Variety considered that García Ruiz delivers "a dense, intimate drama that avoids all the cliches of the problem-teen genre and instead creates an affecting, acutely observed portrait of people in a specific but universally recognizable social milieu", otherwise deeming the psychological drama to be "too subtle" for wide commercial coverage.

José María Caparrós Lera highlights the film's "extreme callousness and narrative classicism" as its hallmarks.

Ángel Fernández-Santos of El País considered the film to be bold yet unbalanced, assessing that the script is not "well-constructed" nor "calculated", but quite the opposite, with the sketch of the lawyer suffering from inaccuracies that imperil the film's formal framework.

== Accolades ==
Year	Award	Category	Nominee(s)	Result	Ref.
2001	15th Goya Awards	Best Adapted Screenplay	Salvador García Ruiz	Nominated	
2001	10th Actors Union Awards	Best Secondary Performance in a Film	Pepa Pedroche	Nominated	
2001	10th Actors Union Awards	Best Minor Performance in a Film	Guillermo Toledo	Nominated	

== See also ==
- List of Spanish films of 2000
