= The Year of Maria =

- Theatrical release poster
- Spanish: Año mariano
- Directed by: Fernando Guillén Cuervo; Karra Elejalde
- Screenplay by: José Antonio Ortega; Karra Elejalde; Fernando Guillén Cuervo
- Produced by: Juanjo Landa
- Starring: Karra Elejalde; Fernando Guillén Cuervo; Manuel Manquiña; Gloria Muñoz; Silvia Bel; Karlos Arguiñano; Fernando Guillén
- Cinematography: Hans Burmann
- Edited by: Pablo Blanco
- Music by: Kike Suárez Alba
- Production company: Asegarce Zinema
- Distributed by: Aurum Films
- Release date: 11 August 2000
- Country: Spain
- Language: Spanish

The Year of Maria (Spanish: Año mariano) is a 2000 Spanish black comedy film directed by Karra Elejalde and Fernando Guillén Cuervo, who also star in the film alongside Manuel Manquiña, Gloria Muñoz, and Sílvia Bel.

== Plot ==
Mariano, an alcoholic cassette salesman, crashes on a marijuana plantation being burned by Guardia Civil agents, so dazed and hallucinated by narcotics, he sees the Virgin Mary. With help from a middling showman (Tony Towers) he becomes a messianic figure in rural southern Spain.

== Cast ==
- Karra Elejalde as Mariano
- Fernando Guillén Cuervo as Antonio Torres (Tony Towers)
- Manuel Manquiña as sargento Pablo Talavera
- Gloria Muñoz as sor Trini
- Sílvia Bel as María Vélez
- Fernando Guillén as don Simón
- Juan Viadas as don Javier
- Pepín Tre as Hopper
- Karlos Arguiñano as Viriato

== Production ==
The film was produced by Asegarce with the collaboration of TVE, Vía Digital, and ETB. Shooting locations in the province of Almería included Cala Carbón (Níjar).

== Release ==
Distributed by Aurum, the film was released theatrically in Spain on 11 August 2000. It was the second-largest grossing Spanish film at the 2000 domestic box-office after Common Wealth.

== Reception ==
Jonathan Holland of Variety deemed the film (otherwise stylistically a baby brother to Juanma Bajo Ulloa's Airbag), to be "at worst sloppy and uncontrolled, at best nicely imaginative".

== Accolades ==
Year	Award	Category	Nominee(s)	Result	Ref.
2001	15th Goya Awards	Best Special Effects	Juan Ramón Molina, Alfonso Nieto	Nominated	

== See also ==
- List of Spanish films of 2000
