= The Cheerful Colsada Girls =

1984 film

- Theatrical film poster
- Spanish: Las alegres chicas de Colsada
- Directed by: Rafael Gil
- Written by: Fernando Vizcaíno Casas
- Starring: Tania Doris; Luis Cuenca; José Bódalo
- Cinematography: José F. Aguayo
- Music by: José Padilla; Alfonso Santisteban
- Production company: Encite Coral
- Distributed by: CIC
- Release date: 3 February 1984
- Running time: 110 minutes
- Country: Spain
- Language: Spanish

The Cheerful Colsada Girls (Spanish: Las alegres chicas de Colsada) is a 1984 Spanish film directed by Rafael Gil and starring Tania Doris, Luis Cuenca and José Bódalo.

== Cast ==
- Tania Doris as Elena
- Luis Cuenca as Manolo
- José Bódalo as Don Matías
- Antonio Garisa as Father Eugenio
- Máximo Valverde as Juan Luis
- Carmen de Lirio as Lola
- Paco Valladares as Alfonso
- Fernando Sancho as Sr. Barbero
- Helga Liné as Charo
- Carolina Figueras as ballerina
- Emilio Laguna as Trinidad
- Ventura Oller
- Carolina Figueras Pijuan as ballerina
- Silvia Solar
