= Pau and His Brother =

2001 film

- Directed by: Marc Recha
- Written by: Marc Recha; Joaquim Jordà
- Produced by: Jacques Bidou; Antonio Chavarrías
- Starring: David Selvas
- Cinematography: Hélène Louvart
- Edited by: Ernest Blasi
- Release date: 25 May 2001
- Running time: 112 minutes
- Countries: Spain; France
- Languages: Spanish; French; Catalan

Pau and His Brother (Catalan: Pau i el seu germà, Spanish: Pau y su hermano, French: Pau et son frère) is a 2001 Spanish-French drama film directed by Marc Recha. It was entered into the 2001 Cannes Film Festival.

== Cast ==
- David Selvas - Pau
- Nathalie Boutefeu - Marta
- Marieta Orozco - Sara
- Luis Hostalot - Emili
- Alicia Orozco - Mercè
- Juan Márquez - Toni
- David Recha - Alex
- Patrícia Bargalló
- Joan Guzmán - Pere
- Sonia Martínez - Chica juzgados
- Mónica Muñoz - Chica piso
- Lourdes Pons - Remel
- Loïc Savouré - Jean Pierre (voice)
- María Tort - Teresina
- Seraff Tort - Republicano

== See also ==
- List of Spanish films of 2001
