= The Goalkeeper (2000 film) =

- Theatrical release poster
- Spanish: El portero
- Directed by: Gonzalo Suárez
- Screenplay by: Gonzalo Suárez; Manuel Hidalgo
- Based on: an original story by Manuel Hidalgo
- Produced by: Andrés Vicente Gómez
- Starring: Carmelo Gómez; Maribel Verdú; Antonio Resines; Roberto Álvarez; Elvira Mínguez; Eduard Fernández; Abel Vitón; Julio Vélez; Adrián Ramírez; Andoni Gracia
- Cinematography: Carlos Suárez
- Edited by: Juan Carlos Arroyo
- Music by: Carles Cases
- Production company: Lolafilms
- Distributed by: Lolafilms Distribución
- Release date: 8 September 2000
- Country: Spain
- Language: Spanish

The Goalkeeper (Spanish: El portero) is a 2000 Spanish drama film directed by Gonzalo Suárez which stars Carmelo Gómez as the title character alongside Maribel Verdú and Antonio Resines.

== Plot ==
The plot follows the mishaps of Ramiro Forteza, a goalie arriving to an Asturian village in 1948, coming to acquaint both with the Guardia Civil and the Maquis.

== Cast ==
- Carmelo Gómez as Ramiro Forteza
- Maribel Verdú as Manuela
- Antonio Resines as Sargento Andrade
- Roberto Álvarez as Don Constantino
- Elvira Mínguez as Úrsula
- Eduard Fernández as Nardo
- Abel Vitón as Médico
- Julio Vélez as López
- Adrián Ramírez as Tito
- Andoni Gracia as Emilio

== Production ==
The screenplay was penned by Gonzalo Suárez alongside Manuel Hidalgo, based on an original story by Hidalgo.

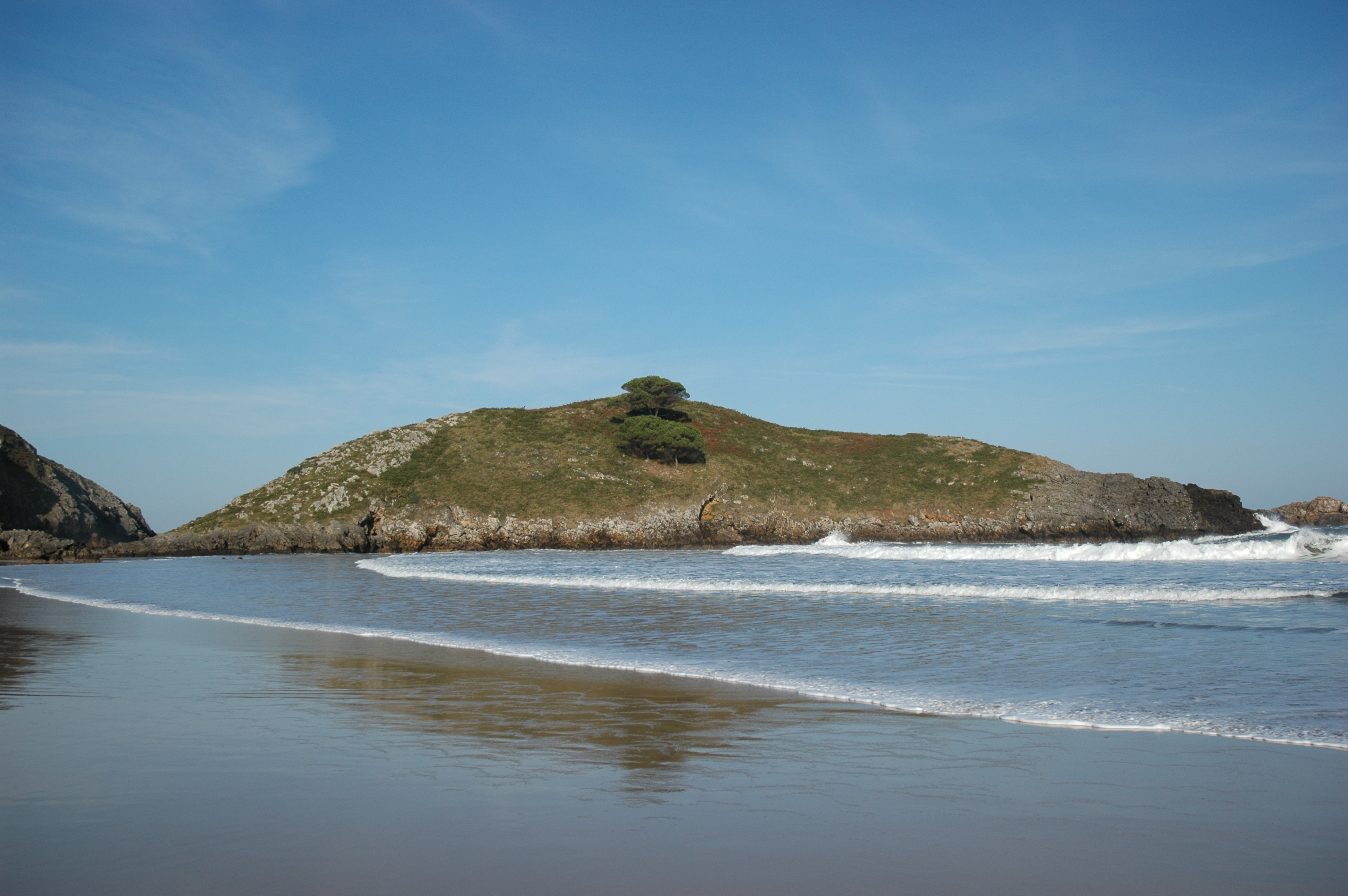
Footage was shot in the Barru Beach (Llanes).

The film was produced by Andrés Vicente Gómez's Lolafilms, and it had the participation of TVE and Vía Digital. Set to start filming, Suárez announced his film to be primarily a western ("although it will also have that perverse mix of genres that I like so much"). It was shot around Llanes, Asturias, including the beaches of Toró, Barru and Borizu.

== Release ==
Distributed by Lolafilms Distribución, the film was theatrically released in Spain on 8 September 2000.

== Reception ==
Jonathan Holland of Variety deemed the film to be "an accomplished, surprisingly low-key historical piece", with "a strong, high-profile cast of solid pros" breathing "convincing life into a delicate, resonant and surprisingly contemporary little parable", otherwise with the director's "tendency toward the histrionic" being "kept under control".

== Accolades ==
Year	Award	Category	Nominee(s)	Result	Ref.
2001	15th Goya Awards	Best Actor	Carmelo Gómez	Nominated	
2001	15th Goya Awards	Best Adapted Screenplay	Manuel Hidalgo, Gonzalo Suárez	Nominated	

== See also ==
- List of association football films
- List of Spanish films of 2000
