= Luis Cuenca =

Spanish actor

Luis Cuenca García
- Born: December 6, 1921
- Died: January 21, 2004 (aged 82); Madrid, Spain
- Other name: Tony Aster
- Occupation: Actor
- Years active: 1928–2004
- Awards: Goya Award for Best Supporting Actor (1996)

Luis Cuenca García (6 December 1921 – 21 January 2004) was a Spanish actor.

== Biography ==
Born into a family of actors, he was the son of Jesús Cuenca Arroyo—a theater artist from Sacedón, Guadalajara—and Carmen García Carrasco—a theater artist from Burgos. His maternal grandparents José García Rojo and Victoria Carrasco, natives of Córdoba, Archidona and El Terrible, were the owners of the theater company "Los Carrasco" in which his parents worked. From a very young age he began acting and first stepped on stage at only seven years old.

After the Spanish Civil War, he began working in revue shows and joined the Company of Celia Gámez, performing under the stage name Tony Aster.

During the following forty years, he established himself as one of the most prominent comic actors of the genre in Spain, maintaining a close professional relationship with impresario Matías Colsada, and participating in several shows alongside actor Pedro Peña and vedette Tania Doris: La dulce viuda (1979), Un reino para Tania (1983), etc. In 1956 he performed at the Teatro Apolo, in Barcelona, in the show Sirenas de Apolo with Gracia Imperio and Pedro Peña, from 4 April 1956 to 1 July 1956.

He made his film debut in 1957 with the revue imitation, Quiéreme con música, by Ignacio F. Iquino. However, having devoted most of his career to theatrical shows, his presence on the big screen was not very prominent and was concentrated mainly in his later years. Notable titles include Perras callejeras (1985), by José Antonio de la Loma, Suspiros de España y Portugal (1995), La buena vida (1996), by David Trueba, Airbag (1997), by Juanma Bajo Ulloa, La hora de los valientes (1998) by Antonio Mercero, Torrente, el brazo tonto de la ley (1998), by Santiago Segura, Obra maestra (2000), again with Trueba, and Di que sí (2004), by Juan Calvo.

He also had a period of television activity coinciding with his later years, in which he participated in the series Farmacia de guardia (1992–1995), Ketty no para (1997), Ellas son así (1999) and Cuéntame cómo pasó (2002–2003).

He died on 21 January 2004 in Madrid due to a pulmonary illness.

== Awards and nominations ==
=== Goya Awards ===
Year	Category	Film	Result
1996	Best Supporting Actor	La buena vida	Won
2000	Best Supporting Actor	Obra maestra	Nominated

- Sant Jordi Awards (1996). Best Supporting Actor for La buena vida.
- Spanish Actors Union (2002). Best TV Supporting Actor for Cuéntame cómo pasó.

== Partial filmography ==
- Quiéreme con música (1957)
- ¿Pena de muerte? (1961) - Barbero
- Las travesuras de Morucha (1962) - Pepe
- Un rincón para querernos (1964) - Sacamuelas
- Toto of Arabia (1965) - El Kasser
- Victòria! La gran aventura d'un poble (1983)
- Victòria! 2: La disbauxa del 17 (1993)
- Victòria! 3: El seny i la rauxa (1984)
- The Cheerful Colsada Girls (1984) - Manolo
- Perras callejeras (1985) - Don Eulogio
- El donante (1985) - Manuel Torrecilla (uncredited)
- Suspiros de España (y Portugal) (1995) - Abad
- Cachito (1996) - Señor
- The Good Life (1996) - Abuelo
- Airbag (1997) - Souza
- Mátame mucho (1998) - Bartolo
- Grandes ocasiones (1998) - Abuelo
- En dag til i solen (1998) - Watchmaker
- Torrente, el brazo tonto de la ley (1998) - Barman
- A Time for Defiance (1998) - Melquíades
- Obra maestra (2000) - Damián
- Soldiers of Salamina (2003) - Padre Lola
- El furgón (2003) - Abogado
- Dos tipos duros (2003) - Padre de Aramis
- ¡Buen viaje, excelencia! (2003)
- Di que sí (2004) - Arturo (final film role)
