= Paszport =

- Directed by: Péter Gothár
- Written by: Péter Gothár; Nelli Litvai
- Starring: Enikö Börcsök; Gergely Kocsis; Eva Feher
- Release date: 1 November 2001
- Running time: 71 minutes
- Country: Hungary
- Language: Hungarian

Paszport (English: Passport) is a 2001 Hungarian film directed by Péter Gothár. It was nominated for European Film Awards in two categories: Best Director and Best Cinematography.

== Story ==
The story of the film begins in the early 1990s in Hungary. Jözsi (Gergely Kocsis) sets out from there to go to the Ukraine to marry and bring home the half-Hungarian Elizaveta (Enikö Börcsök). They could become each other's passport to their upcoming lives.

== Awards and nominations ==
- European Film Award for Best Director - Péter Gothár (nominated)
- European Film Award for Best Cinematography - (nominated)
