= Lázaro de Tormes =

- Theatrical release poster
- Directed by: Fernando Fernán Gómez; José Luis García Sánchez
- Screenplay by: Fernando Fernán Gómez
- Produced by: Andrés Vicente Gómez
- Starring: Rafael Álvarez "El Brujo"; Karra Elejalde; Beatriz Rico; Manuel Alexandre; Álvaro de Luna; Agustín Gonzalez; José Lifante; Francisco Rabal; Francisco Algora; Juan Luis Galiardo; Emilio Laguna; Manuel Lozano; Tina Sainz
- Cinematography: Javier Salmones
- Edited by: Pablo G. del Amo
- Music by: Roque Baños
- Production company: Lolafilms
- Release date: 19 January 2001
- Country: Spain
- Language: Spanish

Lázaro de Tormes is a 2001 Spanish comedy film directed by Fernando Fernán Gómez and José Luis García Sánchez which stars Rafael Álvarez "El Brujo" as the title character.

== Plot ==
Set in the 16th century, the plot concerns about a trial on an adult Lázaro in Toledo. As part of his defence, the character goes on to tell the jury the story of his life (displayed through flashbacks). Rather than Lázaro's ability to persuade the folks, he is "saved" by the deus ex machina arrival of Holy Roman Emperor Charles V to the city.

== Cast ==
- Rafael Álvarez "El Brujo" as Lázaro
- Karra Elejalde as Arcipreste
- Beatriz Rico as Teresa
- Manuel Alexandre as Ecribano
- Francisco Algora as Ventero
- Álvaro de Luna as Calderero
- Juan Luis Galiardo as Alcalde
- Agustín González as Pedro Machuca
- Emilio Laguna as Fray Gabriel
- José Lifante as Clérigo
- Manuel Lozano as Lazarillo
- Francisco Rabal as El Ciego
- Tina Sáinz as Mujer Mercadillo
- José Alias as Relator
- Eva Serrano as Constanza

== Production ==
Written by Fernando Fernán Gómez, the screenplay is an adaptation of a stage monologue (based in turn on the early modern work). It was initially helmed by Fernando Fernán Gómez, but José Luis García Sánchez took over direction duties and completed the film in the wake of Fernán Gómez's illness during production. Shooting locations included Lupiana and Atienza (province of Guadalajara); Talamanca de Jarama (Madrid region) and Toledo.

== Release ==
The film was theatrically released on 19 January 2001.

== Accolades ==
Year	Award	Category	Nominee(s)	Result	Ref.
2001	15th Goya Awards	Best Adapted Screenplay	Fernando Fernán Gómez	Won	
2001	15th Goya Awards	Best Production Supervision	Carmen Martínez Muñoz	Nominated	
2001	15th Goya Awards	Best Art Direction	Luis Ramírez	Nominated	
2001	15th Goya Awards	Best Costume Design	Javier Artiñano	Won	
2001	15th Goya Awards	Best Makeup and Hairstyles	Juan Pedro Hernández, Esther Martín	Nominated	

== See also ==
- List of Spanish films of 2001
