= Pablo Carbonell =

Spanish singer, comedian, and actor

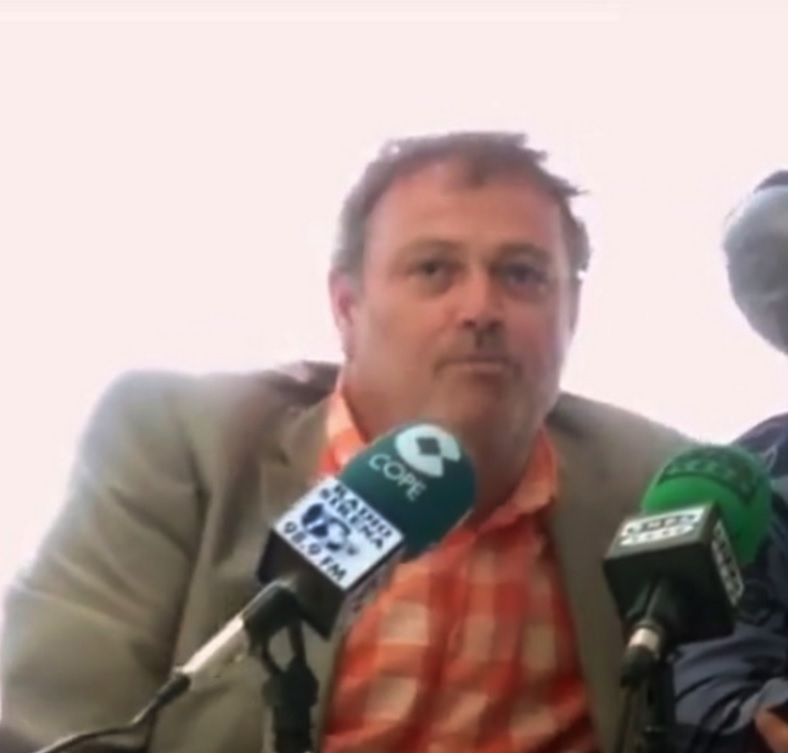
- Carbonell in 2014
- Born: Pablo Carbonell Sánchez-Gijón; 28 July 1962 (age 63); Cádiz, Spain
- Occupations: Comedian; actor; singer
- Relatives: Aitana Sánchez-Gijón (cousin)

Pablo Carbonell Sánchez-Gijón (born 28 July 1962) is a Spanish singer, comedian, and actor.

== Life and career ==
Pablo Carbonell Sánchez-Gijón was born in Cádiz on 28 July 1962. He is a cousin of Aitana Sánchez-Gijón. When he was a child, he moved to Huelva, where he suffered bullying and was diagnosed with scoliosis. He created a comedy duo with Pedro Reyes that started performing street theatre in Huelva in the 1980s. In 1984, he created together with Many Moure and Guillermo Piccolini the musical band Los Toreros Muertos, that blended rock, pop, and ska. Together with Pedro Reyes, he featured in the section "El librovisor" of the popular TVE show La bola de cristal. He made his feature film debut as an actor in Los invitados. For his performance in Masterpiece (2000), Carbonell earned a nomination for the Goya Award for Best New Actor. He won the Best Actor Award at the Málaga Film Festival for Tuna and Chocolate (2004).

== Accolades ==
Year	Award	Category	Work	Result	Ref.
2001	15th Goya Awards	Best New Actor	Masterpiece	Nominated	
