= You're the One (2000 film) =

You're the One (una historia de entonces)
- Theatrical release poster
- Directed by: José Luis Garci
- Written by: José Luis Garci; Horacio Valcárcel
- Starring: Lydia Bosch; Julia Gutiérrez Caba; Juan Diego
- Cinematography: Raúl Pérez Cubero
- Edited by: Miguel G. Sinde
- Music by: Pablo Cervantes
- Production company: Nickel Odeon Dos S.A.
- Distributed by: Columbia TriStar Films de España
- Release date: 27 October 2000 (Spain)
- Running time: 111 minutes
- Country: Spain
- Language: Spanish

You're the One (Spanish: Una historia de entonces) is a 2000 Spanish film directed by José Luis Garci. It was Spain's submission to the 73rd Academy Awards for the Academy Award for Best Foreign Language Film, but was not accepted as a nominee.

== Cast ==
- Lydia Bosch - Julia
- Julia Gutiérrez Caba - tía Gala
- Juan Diego - don Matías
- Ana Fernández - Pilara
- Manuel Lozano - Juanito
- Iñaki Miramón - Orfeo
- Fernando Guillén - Padre de Julia
- Marisa de Leza - Madre de Julia
- Carlos Hipólito - Fidel
- Jesús Puente - doctor Bermann

== Plot ==
Julia, an only child of an affluent, bank owning family living in Madrid, escapes from her family to get over her grief that her boyfriend has been imprisoned. Julia is a well-educated woman, having studied in Switzerland and England, who wants to become a writer. Julia drives to a little village in Asturias called "Corralbos del Sella" and there she stays in a mansion "llendelabarca" of an old childhood friend "Pilara" she had spent many a happy summer with. Also living there is Pilara's mother in law Tia Gala, and her grandson Juanito.

Julia's relationship with caretakers, teacher and priest makes Julia, a woman of the Spanish capital, perhaps for the first time to not feel so alone.

== Awards and nominations ==
- 51st Berlin International Film Festival (2001) – Silver Bear for Outstanding Artistic Contribution.
- European Film Awards (2001)
  - Best Director - José Luis Garci
- Fotogramas de Plata (2001)
  - Best Film Actress - Lydia Bosch
- 15th Goya Awards (2001)
  - Best Film
  - Best Director - José Luis Garci
  - Best Actress in a Leading Role - Lydia Bosch
  - Best Actor in a Supporting Role - Juan Diego
  - Best Actor in a Supporting Role - Iñaki Miramón
  - Best Actress in a Supporting Role - Ana Fernández
  - Best Actress in a Supporting Role - Julia Gutiérrez Caba WINNER
  - Best Original Screenplay - José Luis Garci and Horacio Valcárcel
  - Best Cinematography - Raúl Pérez Cubero WINNER
  - Best Film Editing - Miguel González Sinde WINNER
  - Best Costume Design - Gumersindo Andrés
  - Best Makeup and Hairstyling - Paca Almenara and Antonio Panizza
  - Best Art Direction - Gil Parrondo WINNER
  - Best Production Supervision - Luis María Delgado WINNER

== See also ==
- Cinema of Spain
- List of submissions to the 73rd Academy Awards for Best Foreign Language Film
- List of Spanish submissions for the Academy Award for Best Foreign Language Film
