= Beatriz Rico =

Spanish actress

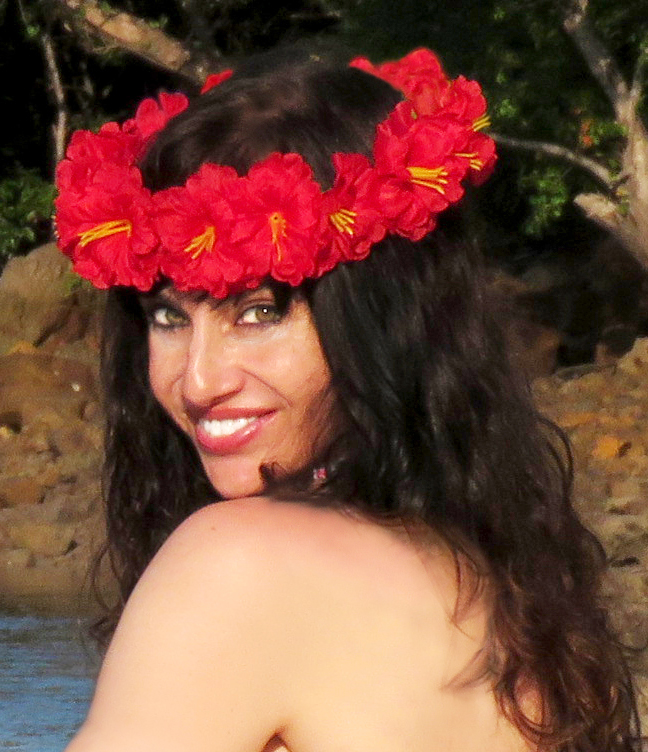
- Beatriz Rico in 2016.
- Born: 25 February 1970 (age 56); Avilés, Asturias, Spain
- Occupations: Actress; television presenter; singer
- Spouse: Rubén Ramírez (m. 2015)
- Awards: "Premio Engromiso Cine Español 2011" and "Celebrity Award of the Year Friend of the Animals 2014" of AnimaNaturalis
- Website: www.beatrizrico.es

Beatriz Rico (born 25 February 1970, in Avilés, Asturias) is a Spanish actress.

== Biography ==
Rico spent most of her childhood and adolescence in Gijón, having studied high school at the Jovellanos Institute. At 19, she moved to Madrid to study drama and ballet. Rico has done work in cinema, theater, and as a singer and photographic model.

== Filmography ==
Year	Title	Ref.
1995	Hermana, pero ¿qué has hecho?	
1995	Los hombres siempre mienten	
1996	İstanbul Kanatlarımın Altında	
1996	Palace	
1996	Pesadilla para un rico	
1997	Corazón loco	
1998	Simpatici & antipatici	
1998	Cuando el mundo se acabe te seguiré amando	
1998	Quince	
2001	Lázaro de Tormes	
2001	Esta noche, no	
2002	Story of a Kiss	
2003	Atraco a las 3 y media	
2004	Tiovivo c. 1950	
2004	Un día sin fin	
2005	The Outcome	
2008	Cenizas del cielo	
2009	Radio Love	
2011	Abrázame	
2012	The Clan	
2014	Las hijas de Danao	
2014	Fuera de Foco	

== Television ==
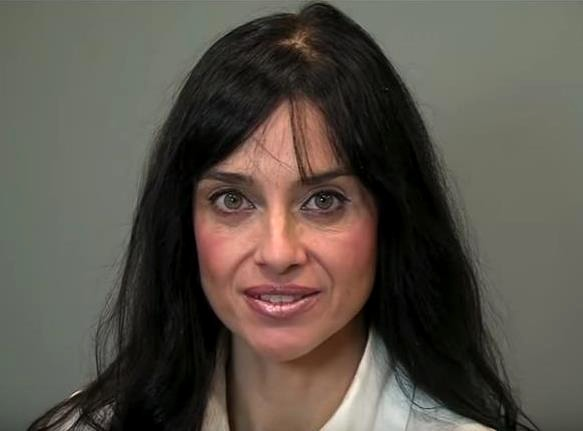

She has also had a continued career as a television actress, participating in numerous series, almost always comedies, a genre in which Beatriz Rico seems to have specialized:

Year	Title	Ref.
1996	Carmen y familia	
1998	A las once en casa	
2000	Abierto 24 horas	
2002	Un Paso Adelante	
2006	Ellas y el sexo débil	
2013	La que se avecina	

== Theatre ==
In theatre Rico played Doña Inés in a performance of Don Juan Tenorio in 1998. She has also worked on Momentos de mi vida (2000), by Alan Ayckbourn, Las señoritas de Aviñón (2001), along with María Asquerino, Los 39 escalones (2008 and 2012) and Las novias de Travolta (2011). In 2012 Rico interprets the monologue Mejor Viuda Que Mal Casada (2012–present). In 2016 he takes part in the assembly of Swingers, from Tirso Calero.
