= Marc Recha =

Spanish film director

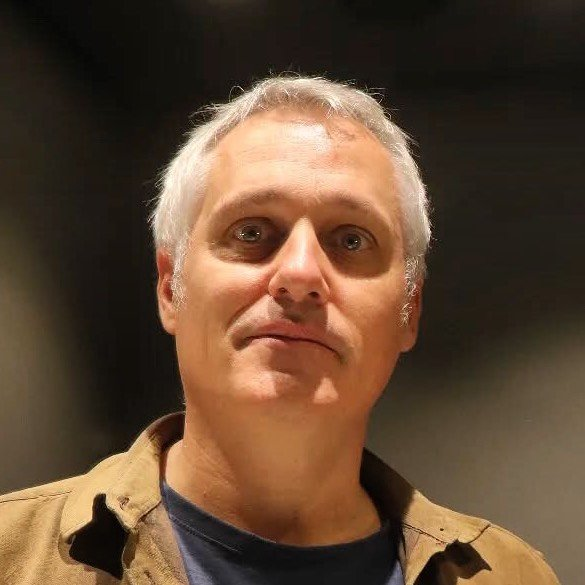
- Born: 18 October 1970 (age 55); L'Hospitalet de Llobregat, Catalonia, Spain
- Occupations: Film director Screenwriter
- Years active: 1988-present

Marc Recha (born 18 October 1970) is a Catalan Spanish film director and screenwriter. He has directed 18 films (9 shorts and 9 feature films) since 1988. He mostly films his films in Catalan Language but also in French and Spanish. His film Pau i el seu germà was entered into the 2001 Cannes Film Festival.

== Filmography ==
=== Full-length Films ===
- 1991 - El cielo sube (Heaven Rises)
- 1998 - L'arbre de les cireres (The Cherry Tree)
- 2001 - Pau i el seu germà (Pau and His Brother)
- 2003 - Les mains vides / Les mans buides (Where is Madame Catherine?, or Empty-Handed)
- 2006 - Dies d'agost (August Days)
- 2009 - Petit indi ('Petit indi' - the director does not translate it, though literally, it's "Little Indian")
- 2014 - Bridges of Sarajevo (Recha participates in this documentary anthology film together with 12 other directors)
- 2015 - Un dia perfecte per volar (A Perfect Day for Flying)
- 2017 - La vida lliure (Free life)

=== Shorts ===
- 1988 - El darrer instant (The Last Instant)
- 1990 - El zelador (The Guard)
- 1990 - La por d'abocar-se (The Fear of Falling)
- 1990 - Tout à la française (Everything French-Style)
- 1992 - La maglana
- 1994 - És tard (It's Late)
- 1998 - L'escampavies (The Coast Guard)
- 2001 - Sobre el pas de dues persones uns quants anys més tard (On the Passage of Two People Several Years Later)
- 2007 - Coses vistes (Things Seen)
