= La comunidad (film) =

- Spanish film poster
- Directed by: Álex de la Iglesia
- Written by: Jorge Guerricaechevarría; Álex de la Iglesia
- Produced by: Andrés Vicente Gómez
- Starring: Carmen Maura; Eduardo Antuña; María Asquerino; Jesús Bonilla; Marta Fernández Muro; Paca Gabaldón; Ane Gabarain; Sancho Gracia; Emilio Gutiérrez Caba; Kiti Mánver; Terele Pávez; Roberto Perdomo; Manuel Tejada; Enrique Villén
- Cinematography: Kiko de la Rica
- Edited by: Alejandro Lázaro
- Music by: Roque Baños
- Production company: LolaFilms
- Distributed by: LolaFilms
- Release dates: 21 September 2000 (SSIFF); 29 September 2000 (Spain)
- Running time: 107 minutes
- Country: Spain
- Language: Spanish
- Box office: €6.71 million

La comunidad (UK title: Common Wealth) is a 2000 Spanish black comedy film directed by Álex de la Iglesia.

Driven by the ambition and greed of the characters to the point of the degradation of their human condition, the plot concerns the developments in a homeowner community in Madrid upon the finding of 300 million ₧ in the apartment of a dead man by real estate agent Julia (Carmen Maura). Maura garnered critical acclaim for her performance and scooped a Silver Shell and a Goya Award for Best Actress.

== Plot ==
The plot is set in Madrid. Julia, a real estate agent, discovers 300 million ₧ in the apartment of a dead man. Unfortunately, the neighbours have been waiting for the man to die so that they can seize the money for themselves.

== Cast ==
- Carmen Maura as Julia
- Eduardo Antuña as Charly
- María Asquerino as Encarna
- Jesús Bonilla as Ricardo
- Marta Fernández Muro as Paquita
- Paca Gabaldón as Hortensia
- Ane Gabarain as Karina
- Sancho Gracia as Castro
- Emilio Gutiérrez Caba as Emilio
- Kiti Mánver as Dolores
- Terele Pávez as Ramona
- Roberto Perdomo as Oswaldo
- Manuel Tejada as Chueca
- Enrique Villén as Domínguez
- Eduardo Gómez as García
- Ramón Barea
- Mariví Bilbao
- Luis Tosar
- Antonio de la Torre
- Rodolfo Sancho

== Production ==
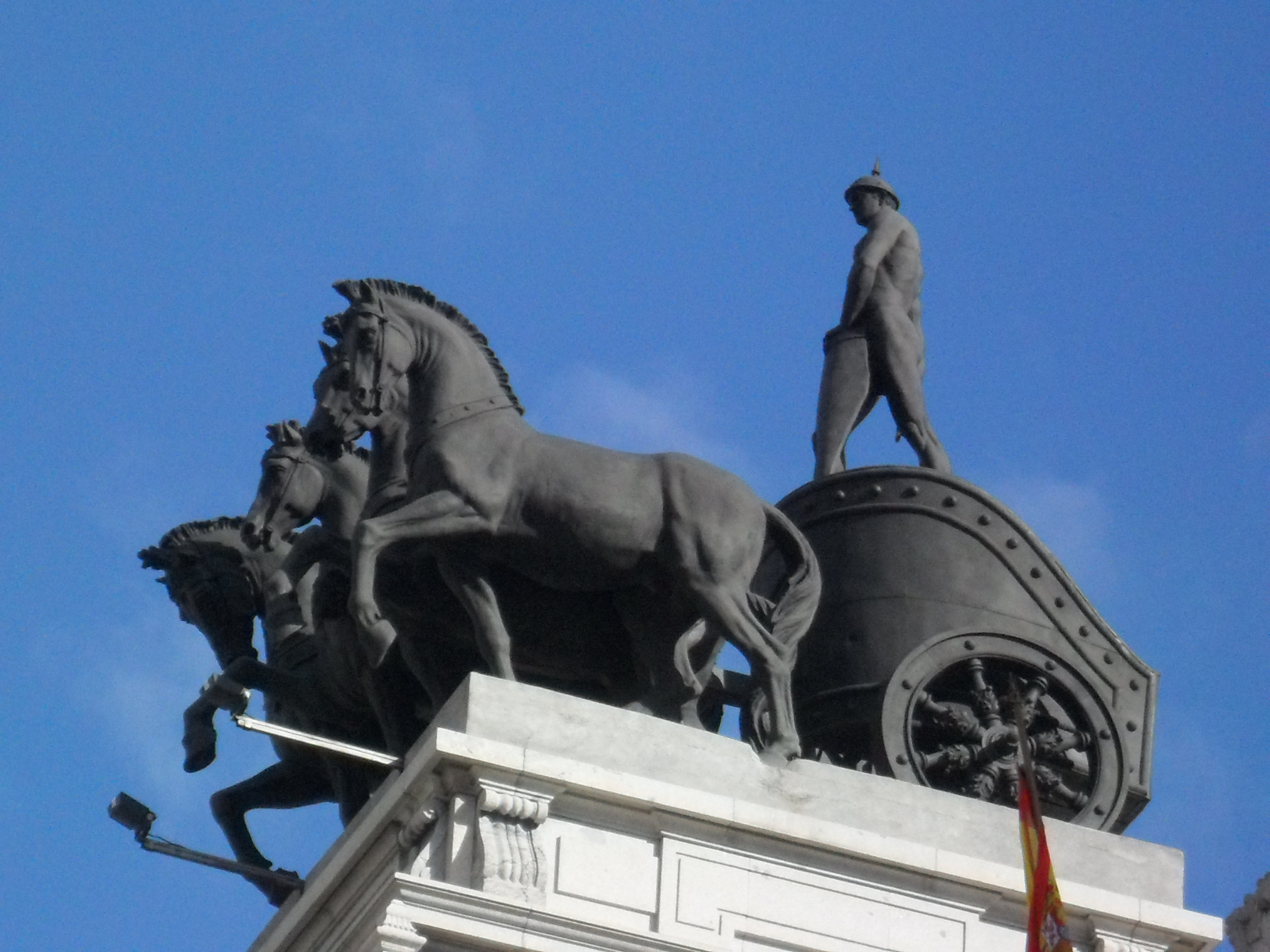
The final fight was shot among the quadrigas atop the Banco de Bilbao building in Madrid.

The film was produced by LolaFilms and it had the participation of Antena 3 and Vía Digital. The fictional building is credited to be Carrera de San Jerónimo 14. The indoor shots were however filmed in Calle del Desengaño.

== Release ==
The film screened as the opening film of the 48th San Sebastián International Film Festival (SSIFF) on 21 September 2000. It was theatrically released in Spain on 29 September 2000 on 165 screens and grossed $680,000 in its opening weekend, finishing third at the box office.

La comunidad grossed €6,709,858 from 1,601,861 admissions and was the highest grossing Spanish film of 2000.

A 4K restoration of La comunidad is set to be released in Spanish theatres on 21 August 2025 by Avalon.

== Accolades ==
Year	Award	Category	Nominee(s)	Result	Ref.
2000	48th San Sebastián International Film Festival	Silver Shell for Best Actress	Carmen Maura	Won	
2001	15th Goya Awards	Best Film		Nominated	
2001	15th Goya Awards	Best Director	Álex de la Iglesia	Nominated	
2001	15th Goya Awards	Best Original Screenplay	Jorge Guerricaechevarría, Álex de la Iglesia	Nominated	
2001	15th Goya Awards	Best Original Score	Roque Baños	Nominated	
2001	15th Goya Awards	Best Actress	Carmen Maura	Won	
2001	15th Goya Awards	Best Supporting Actor	Emilio Gutiérrez Caba	Won	
2001	15th Goya Awards	Best Supporting Actress	Terele Pávez	Nominated	
2001	15th Goya Awards	Best Production Supervision	Juanma Pagazaurtundua	Nominated	
2001	15th Goya Awards	Best Cinematography	Kiko de la Rica	Nominated	
2001	15th Goya Awards	Best Editing	Alejandro Lázaro	Nominated	
2001	15th Goya Awards	Best Art Direction	José Luis Arrizabalaga "Arri", Arturo García "Biaffra"	Nominated	
2001	15th Goya Awards	Best Costume Design	Paco Delgado	Nominated	
2001	15th Goya Awards	Best Makeup and Hairstyles	José Quetglás, Mercedes Guillot	Nominated	
2001	15th Goya Awards	Best Sound	Antonio Rodríguez "Mármol", Jaime Fernández, James Muñoz, Enrique Domínguez, José Vinader	Nominated	
2001	15th Goya Awards	Best Special Effects	Félix Bergés, Raúl Romanillos, Pau Costa, Julio Navarro	Nominated	

== See also ==
- List of Spanish films of 2000

== Bibliography ==
- Bracco, Diane (2014). "Las entrañas de Madrid: la radiografía de Álex de la Iglesia" (PDF). Pandora (12). ISSN 2108-7210.
- Buse, Peter; Triana Toribio, Núria; Willis, Andy (2007). The cinema of Álex de la Iglesia. Manchester and New York: Manchester University Press. ISBN 9780719071362.
