= Nico and Dani =

- Spanish film poster
- Directed by: Cesc Gay
- Written by: Cesc Gay; Tomás Aragay
- Starring: Fernando Ramallo; Jordi Vilches
- Release date: 2000
- Running time: 91 min
- Country: Spain
- Languages: Spanish, English
- Box office: $370,562

Nico and Dani (Spanish: Krámpack) is a 2000 Spanish Coming-of-age comedy film about the sexual awakening of two teenagers, as one comes to terms with his homosexuality and the other with his heterosexuality. The Spanish title refers to a form of mutual masturbation that the two practice.

It is a loose adaptation of an original screenplay by Spanish actor and screenwriter Jordi Sánchez

Filming took place in the Catalan town of Castelldefels and in various locations in the county of Garraf. The DVD offers short features on the making of the film, theater trailer, interviews with the actors and director, and two music videos made from the film. The film is unrated in its USA release.

== Plot ==
Nico and Dani are 17-year-old friends spending the summer together at Dani's parent's beach house, while his parents are traveling. They aim to meet girls and lose their virginity, and in the meantime they practice mutual masturbation and other sexual practices. They meet a pair of cousins, Berta and Elena. Nico is much more interested in Elena than Dani is in Berta. Nico has sex with Elena, making Dani jealous of her.

Dani realizes he is in love with Nico and tells him this, causing an argument. Dani then goes out to get drunk and meets a gay writer friend of his father. After having dinner and sailing with him, Dani proposes that the two have sex, but runs away and returns home to Nico. The friends reconcile by the end of the summer.

== Cast ==
- Fernando Ramallo as Dani
- Jordi Vilches as Nico
- Marieta Orozco as Elena
- Esther Nubiola as Berta
- Chisco Amado as Julián
- Ana Gracia as Sonia
- Myriam Mézières as Marianne
- Muntsa Alcañiz as Dani's mother
- Jesús Garay as Dani's father
- Mingo Ràfols as Arturo
- Pau Durà as Mario
- Eduardo González as the Waiter

== Accolades ==
Nico and Dani was nominated for, and won, several awards in Spanish and international award ceremonies and festivals, also being honored for its LGBT representation. In fact, Nico and Dani was the first movie to receive the Sebastiane Award delivered during the San Sebastián International Film Festival.

| Award/Film Festival | Date of ceremony | Category | Recipient(s) | Result | Reference(s) |
|---|---|---|---|---|---|
| Bogotá Film Festival | 10-18 October 2000 | Golden Precolumbian Circle | Cesc Gay | Nominated | |
| Bogotá Film Festival | 10-18 October 2000 | Silver Precolumbian Circle | Cesc Gay | Won | |
| Bratislava International Film Festival | 1-9 December 2000 | Grand Prix | Cesc Gay | Nominated | |
| Cannes Film Festival | 14-25 May 2000 | Special Award of the Youth | Cesc Gay | Won | |
| Chicago International Film Festival | 5-19 October 2000 | FIPRESCI Prize for its sensitive and daring treatment of teenage sexuality | Cesc Gay | Won | |
| Hamburg Film Festival | 2000 | Golden Tesafilm Roll | Cesc Gay | Won | |
| GLAAD Media Awards | 2002 | Outstanding Film - Limited Release | | Nominated | |
| Goya Awards | 2001 | Best Adapted Screenplay (Mejor Guión Adaptado) | Cesc Gay, Tomàs Aragay | Nominated | |
| Goya Awards | 2001 | Best New Actor (Mejor Actor Revelación) | Jordi Vilches | Nominated | |
| Goya Awards | 2001 | Best New Director (Mejor Director Novel) | Cesc Gay | Nominated | |
| Málaga Spanish FIlm Festival | 2000 | Best Director | Cesc Gay | Won | |
| Málaga Spanish FIlm Festival | 2000 | Special mention for his performance | Jordi Vilches | Won | |
| Málaga Spanish FIlm Festival | 2000 | Best film | Cesc Gay | Nominated | |
| Miami Gay and Lesbian Film Festival | 2001 | Special Jury Award for outstanding achievement | Cesc Gay | Won | |
| San Sebastián International Film Festival | 2000 | Sebastiane award | Cesc Gay | Won | |
| Stockholm Film Festival | 2000 | Honorable Mention | Cesc Gay | Won | |
| Stockholm Film Festival | 2000 | Bronze Horse | Cesc Gay | Nominated | |
| Mostra de València-Cinema del Mediterrani | 2000 | Best First Work | Cesc Gay | Won | |
| Butaca Awards | 2000 | Best Catalan Film (Millor película catalana) | Cesc Gay | Won | |
| Butaca Awards | 2000 | Best Catalan Film Actor (Millor actor català de cinema) | Jordi Vilches | Nominated | |
| Turia Awards | 2001 | Best Spanish Film | Cesc Gay | Won | |
