= El Bola =

- Directed by: Achero Mañas
- Written by: Archero Mañas
- Starring: Juan José Ballesta; Pablo Galán; Alberto Jiménez; Ana Wagener
- Music by: Eduardo Arbide
- Distributed by: Axiom Films (UK and Ireland)
- Release date: 20 October 2000
- Running time: 88 minutes
- Country: Spain
- Language: Spanish

El Bola (English: Pellet) is a 2000 Spanish drama film, directed by Achero Mañas. It won the Goya Award for Best Film at the 15th Goya Awards. It is available in the United States from Filmmovement.

== Plot ==
Pablo a.k.a. "El Bola" is a twelve-year-old boy with an overly aggressive father. He has few friends at school until a new kid, Alfredo, arrives. The warm, caring atmosphere in Alfredo's family provides a stark contrast to Pablo's violent father. Pablo's experience of his friend's family teaches him to confront his worst fears.

== Cast ==
- Juan José Ballesta as Bola
- Pablo Galán as Alfredo
- Alberto Jiménez as José
- Manuel Morón as Mariano
- Ana Wagener as Laura
- Nieve de Medina as Marisa
- Gloria Muñoz as Aurora
- Javier Lago as Alfonso
- Omar Muñoz as Juan
