= Juan Luis Galiardo =

Spanish actor

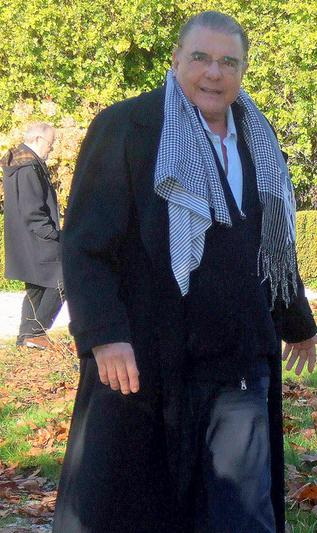
- Galiardo in 2010
- Born: Juan Luis Galiardo Comes; 2 March 1940; San Roque, Cádiz, Spain
- Died: 22 June 2012 (aged 72); Madrid, Spain
- Occupation: Actor
- Years active: 1962–2012
- Spouses: Juana Prieto; María Elías
- Children: 5 children

Juan Luis Galiardo Comes (2 March 1940 – 22 June 2012) was a Spanish television, theater and film actor.

== Life ==
The eldest of six children, Juan Luis Galiardo Comes was born in San Roque, Cádiz, but spent most of his childhood and youth in Badajoz, where his father had moved following working opportunities. After finishing his secondary education in Seville, Galiardo studied Agricultural Engineering at the University of Madrid. He abandoned his studies in 1961, to enroll the following year at Spain's National Film School (EOC) where he trained as an actor. He began his career working in the theater under the direction of José Luis Alonso de Santos in the theater María Guerrero. With some fellow actors he founded the T.E.I. (Independent Experimental Theatre), directed by Miguel Narros.

Galiardo made his film debut in the leading role in Julio Diamante's film El arte de vivir (The Art of Living) (1965). In the next 16 years, he appeared in more than 50 movies, becoming one of the most popular romantic lead actors of Spanish films thanks in great part to his good looks. Among his film of this period are notable his performances in Carlos Saura's Stress es tres, tres (Stress is three, three) (1968), Vicente Aranda's Clara es el precio (Clara is the Price) (1974), and two films by Jaime Camino: Mañana será otro dia (Tomorrow is another day) (1966) and La campanada (Pealing of the Bells) (1980).

In 1979, Galiardo went to Mexico, where he lived for five years, appearing in secondary roles in Mexican films and in popular television dramas. In 1982 he received the Heraldo award as best actor

In 1986, he returned to Spain continuing his acting career and became involved in film production. With Penélope Films, his own production company, he produced the TV series Turno de oficio and films like El disputado voto del señor Cayo, a film directed by Antonio Giménez-Rico.

With his work in television in Turno de oficio (1986- 1987), Galiardo began to break away from his previous image of leading-man, accepting more dramatic roles and showing a wider range in this, the third phase of his career. He co-starred in some big projects both in film and television as in La regenta (1995), a production for Televisión Española directed by Fernando Mendez-Leite. Among his most notable films are The Little Spanish Soldier (1988); Guarapo (1989); Don Juan, mi querido fantasma (1989); Madregilda (1993); Familia (1996), directed by Fernando León de Aranoa; Pajarico (1997), directed by Carlos Saura; Adiós con el corazón (1999), directed by José Luis García Sánchez for which Galiardo won the Goya Award as best actor in 2000; Lázaro de Tormes (2000); El caballero Don Quijote (2001); and Miguel y William (2007). His roles in this two last films allowed him to be the only actor to play both Miguel de Cervantes and his most famous creation Don Quijote de la Mancha.

In 2007, he played Fidel Castro in I Love Miami, a parody of the famous dictator possible flight to Miami as just another rafter. The following year, Galirado played an important role in the gay-themed film Clandestinos, which raised some controversy mainly due to the promotional image of the film. His last film was La chispa de la vida (2010), directed by Alex de la Iglesia. He died, aged 72, in Madrid of lung cancer.

== Selected filmography ==
- Canción de juventud (1962) - Chico (uncredited)
- Le tre spade di Zorro (1963) - Felipe
- El camino (1963) - Novio de Mica
- Rueda de sospechosos (1964) - El Moro
- El arte de vivir (1965) - Juanjo
- Crimen de doble filo (1965) - Fotógrafo
- Two Sergeants of General Custer (1965) - Fidanzato di Mary
- Megatón Ye-Ye (1965) - Fausto (voice, uncredited)
- Seven Golden Men (1965)
- El juego de la oca (1965) - Amigo en fiesta de cumpleaños
- Komm mit zur blauen Adria (1966)
- En Andalucía nació el amor (1966) - Luis
- Hoy como ayer (1966) - Boyfriend in Discotheque
- Vestida de novia (1966)
- Querido profesor (1966)
- El padre Manolo (1967) - Ricardo, el novio de la sobrina de Manolo
- Mañana será otro día (1967) - Paco
- Acteón (1967) - Joven
- Novios 68 (1967) - Antonio, novio de Julia
- No desearás la mujer de tu prójimo (1968) - Carlos
- La chica de los anuncios (1968) - Leo
- Giugno '44 - Sbarcheremo in Normandia (1968) - Rob Master
- Stress Is Three (1968) - Antonio
- Cristina Guzmán (1968) - Jorge
- La canción del olvido (1969) - Capitán Leonello
- Las nenas del mini-mini (1969) - Chalo
- Pepa Doncel (1969) - Gonzalo Carvajal Sastre
- Después de los nueve meses (1970) - Pablo Román
- Coqueluche (1970) - Juan Castro
- Una señora llamada Andrés (1970) - Andrés Guzmán
- El apartamento de la tentación (1971) - Alberto
- Fieras sin jaula (1971) - Pietro
- Hector the Mighty (1972) - Paride
- Antony and Cleopatra (1972) - Alexas
- Bianco rosso e... (1972) - Guido
- Alta tensión (1972) - José
- The Call of the Wild (1972) - Seze
- Autopsia (1973) - Juan
- El juego del adulterio (1973) - Andrés
- Death's Newlyweds (1975) - Juan Ramón Soler
- Clara is the Price (1975) - Jorge
- El clan de los inmorales (1975)
- The Good Days Lost (1975) - Lorenzo
- Naked Therapy (1975) - Ricardo
- Unmarried Mothers (1975)
- Imposible para una solterona (1976) - Luis
- Mayordomo para todo (1976) - Carlos
- El alijo (1976) - Curro
- Lucecita (1976)
- Un día con Sergio (1976) - Sergio Melgar
- La promesa (1976)
- El límite del amor (1976) - Juan
- Hasta que el matrimonio nos separe (1977) - Chus
- Inquisition (1977) - Jean Duprat
- Esposa de día, amante de noche (1977) - Federico
- El ladrido (1977) - Mauro
- Comando Txikia: Muerte de un presidente (1978) - Julen
- Una familia decente (1978) - Juan Salcedo
- Guyana: Cult of the Damned (1979) - Reporter
- Father Cami's Wedding (1979) - José Lloret
- And in the Third Year, He Rose Again (1980) - Automovilista
- La campanada (1980) - Ambros
- Quiero soñar (1981) - Juan Luis
- Rastro de muerte (1981)
- Préstame tu mujer (1981) - Rodolfo
- Con el cuerpo prestado (1983) - Pedro
- The Disputed Vote of Mr. Cayo (1986) - Víctor
- Policía (1987) - Maxi
- La guerra de los locos (1987) - Don Salvador
- Guarapo (1987)
- El señor de los llanos (1987) - Fabián Insausti
- Pasodoble (1988) - Diputado
- The Little Spanish Soldier (1988) - Francisco Calleja
- El vuelo de la paloma (1989) - Luis Doncel
- Supporting Roles (1989) - Alejandro
- Don Juan, mi querido fantasma (1990) - Don Juan Tenorio / Don Juan Marquina
- Yo soy ésa (1990) - Padre Benito
- Capità Escalaborns (1991) - El Borni
- Ho sap el ministre? (1991) - Francisco Carmona
- La taberna fantástica (1991)
- Catorce estaciones (1991) - Lázaro
- Los mares del sur (1992) - Pepe Carvalho
- Madregilda (1993) - Legionario
- Todos a la cárcel (1993) - Muñagorri
- ¡Por fin solos! (1994) - Héctor Lafuente
- Enciende mi pasión (1994) - Lucas
- Los hombres siempre mienten (1995) - Adolfo
- Así en el cielo como en la tierra (1995) - Ruíz del Río
- Suspiros de España (y Portugal) (1995) - Fray Liborio / Juan
- Nexo (1995) - Abogado
- Mar de luna (1995)
- La leyenda de Balthasar el Castrado (1996) - Narrador
- Familia (1996) - Santiago
- Tramway to Malvarrosa (1996) - Arsenio
- Siempre hay un camino a la derecha (1997) - Juan
- Pajarico (1997) - Tío Emilio
- Tango (1997) - Angelo Larroca
- ¡Qué vecinos tan animales! (1998) - Sres. Galápagos (voice)
- The Girl of Your Dreams (1998) - Embajador
- Sí, quiero... (1999) - Don Jaime
- Esa Maldita Costilla (1999) - Génesis (voice)
- Adiós con el corazón (2000) - Juan
- Lázaro de Tormes (2001) - Alcalde
- Torrente 2: Misión en Marbella (2001) - Gentleman
- Buñuel y la mesa del rey Salomón (2001) - Crítico de Cine
- Vivancos 3 (2002) - Pajarda
- Rosa la China (2002) - Dulzura
- El caballero Don Quijote (2002) - Don Quijote
- Lisístrata (2002) - Hepatitos
- El oro de Moscú (2003) - Alberto Tajuña
- Dripping (2003) - Baron de Cervera
- Franky Banderas (2004) - Avelino
- I Love Miami (2006) - Fidel / Alejandro
- El coronel Macià (2006) - Capitán General Polavieja
- Pobre juventud (2006) - Marcelo
- Miguel y William (2007) - Miguel de Cervantes
- Clandestinos (2007) - Germán
- El asesino a sueldo (2009) - Inspector
- La llegenda de l'innombrable (2010) - Innombrable
- La daga de Rasputín (2011) - Zadkin
- As Luck Would Have It (2011) - Alcalde
