= Laia Marull =

Spanish actress

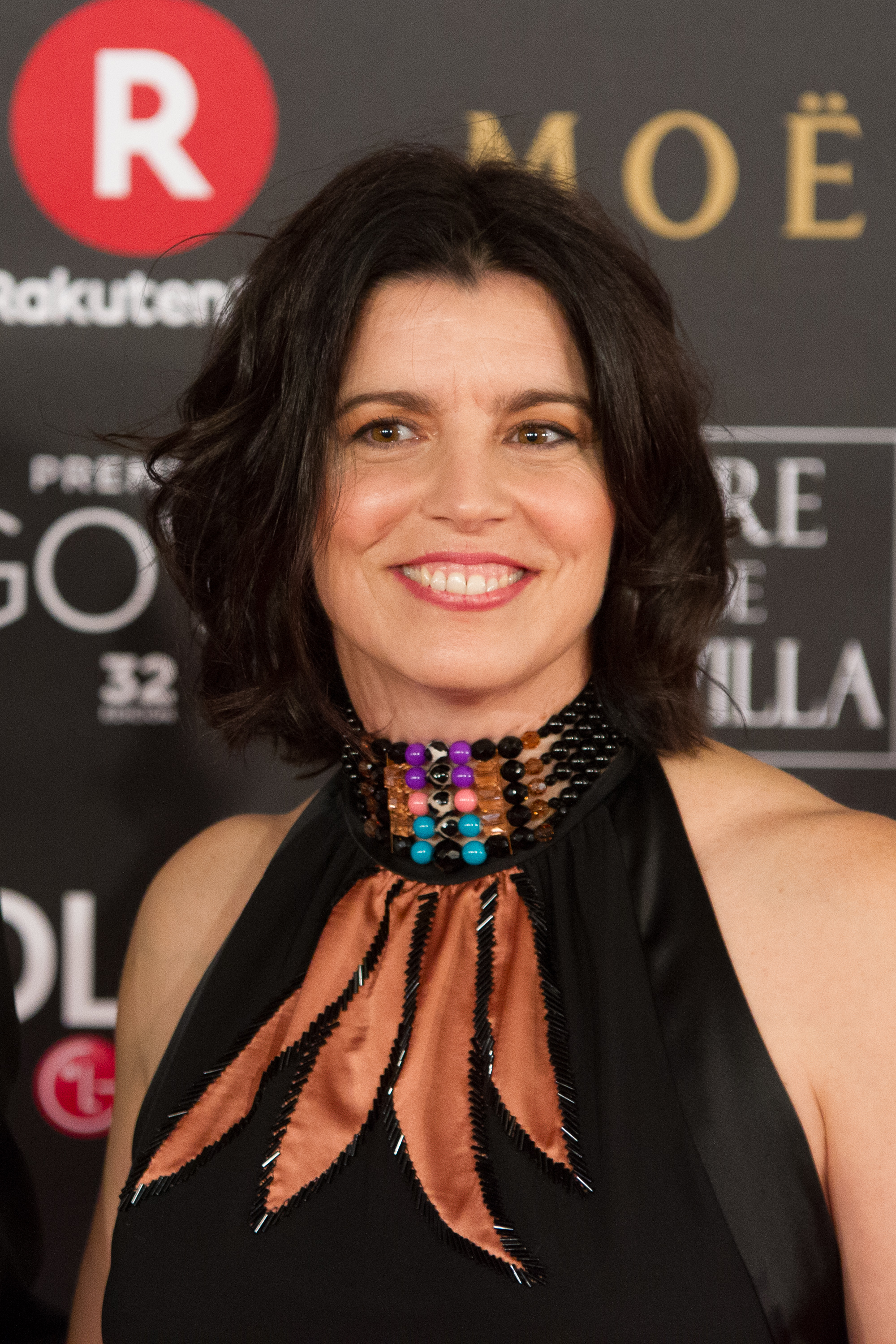
- Marull in 2018
- Born: Laia Marull Quintana; 4 January 1973 (age 53); Barcelona, Spain
- Occupation: Actress
- Years active: 1994–present

Laia Marull Quintana (born 4 January 1973) is a Spanish actress. She has won three Goya Awards — Best New Actress for Fugitives (2000), Best Actress for Take My Eyes (2003), and Best Supporting Actress for Black Bread (2010). She was also nominated for European Film Award for Best Actress for Take My Eyes.

Marull is known for her work on film, television and stage, and has performed in Spanish, Catalan and French.

== Biography ==
Laia Marull Quintana was born on 4 January 1973 in Barcelona. She began her career in an amateurish theatre.

Marull studied acting at the Nancy Tuñón Theater School in Barcelona. She made her acting debut in 1994 on the Catalan television channel TV3 series "Estació d'enllaç", which made her popular in Catalonia. Two years later, in 1996, she began her film career with "Razones sentimentales".

Marull has won three Goya Awards and a Donostia Zinemaldia Silver Shell.

She is fluent in Spanish, Catalan and French, and has performed in all these languages.

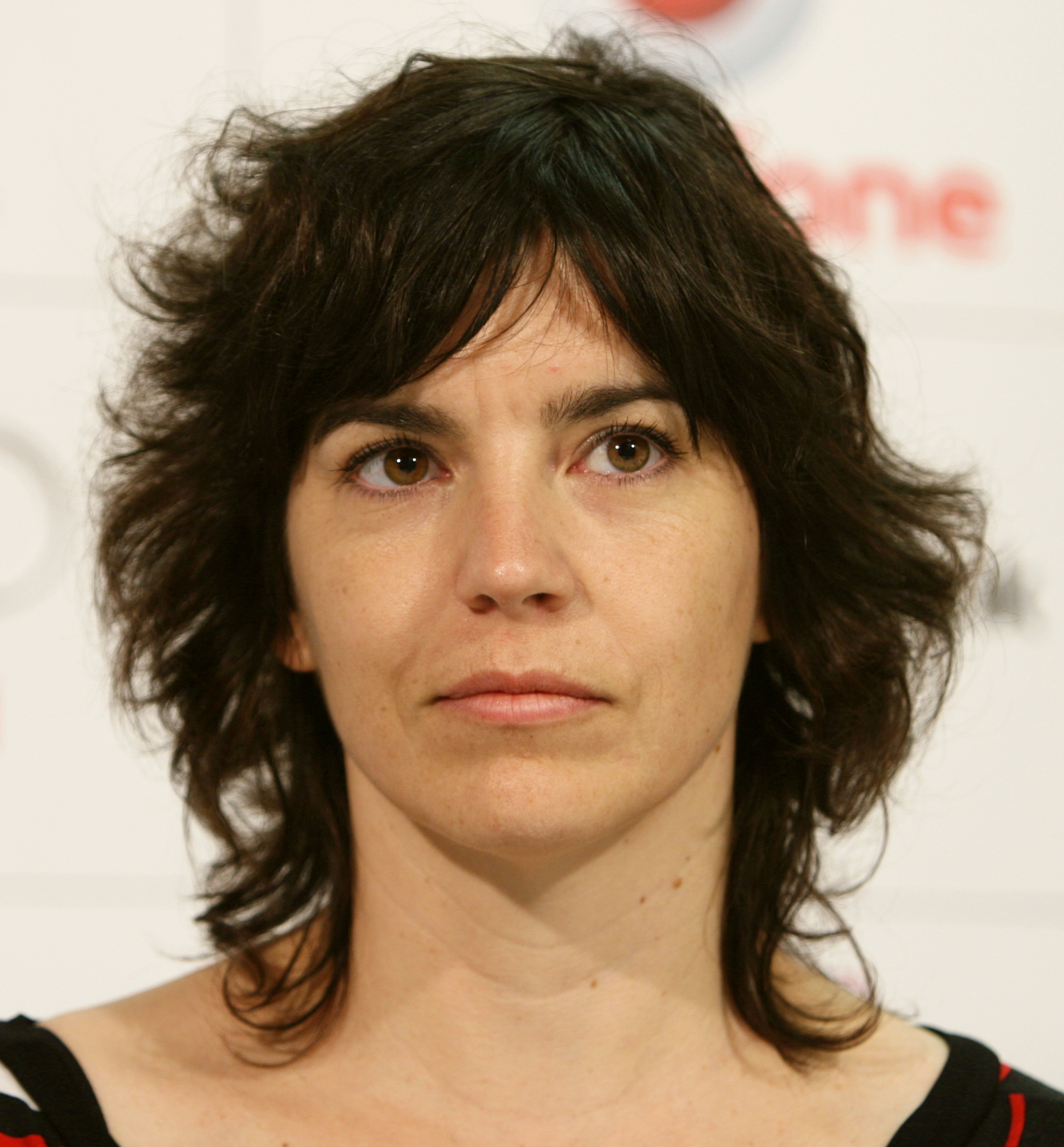
Marull at the 2008 Karlovy Vary International Film Festival

== Filmography ==
=== Film ===
Year	Title	Role	Notes	Ref.
1996	Razones sentimentales	Tiffani		
1996	Asunto interno	Teresa		
1998	Mensaka, páginas de una historia (Mensaka)	Bea		
1999	Lisboa (Lisbon)	Verónica		
1999	La sombra de Caín	Patricia		
2000	El viaje de Arián (Arian's Journey)	Isabel Ulloa		
2000	Pleure pas Germaine	Catarina		
2000	Fugitivas (Fugitives)	Tony		
2000	Café Ole	Alicia		
2003	Te doy mis ojos (Te doy mis ojos)	Pilar		
2003	Las voces de la noche (Voices in the Night)	Elisa		
2005	Oculto (The Hidden)	Beatriz		
2007	El Greco	Jerónima de las Cuevas		
2008	Pretextos	Eva		
2010	La herencia Valdemar (The Valdemar Legacy)	Leonor Valdemar		
2010	Pa negre (Black Bread)	Pauleta		
2011	La herencia Valdemar II: La sombra prohibida (The Valdemar Legacy II: The Forbidden Shadow)			
2011	Las olas (The Waves)	Blanca		
2016	Quatretondeta	Dora		
2016	La madre	Carmen		
2017	Brava	Janine		
2019	La innocència (The Innocence)	Soledad		
2025	La terra negra (The Black Land)	Maria		

=== Television ===
Year	Title	Role	Notes	Ref.
1994–98	Estació d'enllaç	Esther Valls Canales		
1997	Primera jugada	Núria		
1997	Nova ficció	Lola		
1998	Pirata	Àfrica	TV movie	
2011	Ermessenda	Ermessenda	Miniseries	
2015	Los nuestros	Montse		
2016	La Xirgu	Margarita Xirgu	TV movie	

== Awards and nominations ==
Award	Year	Category	Nominated work	Result
Gaudí Awards	2020	Best Supporting Actress	La Innocència	Won
ACE Awards	2005	Best Actress	Take My Eyes	Nominated
ADIRCAE Awards	2004	Best Performance in a Leading Role	Take My Eyes	Won
Butaca Awards	1998	Best Catalan Film Actress	Mensaka	Nominated
Butaca Awards	2004	Best Catalan Film Actress	Take My Eyes	Nominated
Cinema Writers Circle Awards	2004	Best Actress	Take My Eyes	Won
European Film Awards	2004	Best Actress	Take My Eyes	Nominated
Fotogramas de Plata	2004	Best Film Actress	Take My Eyes	Won
Ft. Lauderdale International Film Festival	2001	Best Actress	Fugitives	Won
Goya Awards	2001	Best New Actress	Fugitives	Won
Goya Awards	2004	Best Actress	Take My Eyes	Won
Goya Awards	2011	Best Supporting Actress	Black Bread	Won
San Sebastián International Film Festival	2004	Best Actress	Take My Eyes	Won
Sant Jordi Awards	2004	Best Spanish Actress	Take My Eyes	Won
Turia Awards	2004	Best Actress	Take My Eyes	Won
