= Pedro Reyes (comedian) =

Spanish comedian, humorist, actor and television presenter

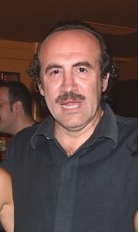
- Pedro Reyes in 2011
- Born: Pedro Reyes Rodríguez; 8 May 1961; Tangier, Morocco
- Died: 25 March 2015 (aged 53); Valencia, Spain
- Occupations: Actor and humorist

Pedro Reyes (8 May 1961 – 25 March 2015) was a Spanish comedian, humorist, actor and television presenter. He was known for his surreal humour and collaboration with Pablo Carbonell in the 1980s.

== Biography ==
Reyes was born in Tangier, Morocco, in 1961 but early on moved with his family to Huelva, Spain, the birth city of his mother. In 1977 he joined the theatre group Centuria. During the 1980s together with Pablo Carbonell, he formed the comedy duo Pedro y Pablo, working first out of Sevilla and later, in 1982, Madrid. The duo was discovered in the Buen Retiro Park in Madrid by an El País journalist, and soon afterwards they became recurring characters in the television show La Bola de Cristal.

In 1989 Reyes became co-host of the television show Pero ¿esto qué es?. Apart from his work in television and comedy he also appeared in movies and directed two theatre plays in 2013.

Apart from his Andalusian accent Reyes was known for his appearance: long, bald with spiky hair and a mustache. Reyes died of a heart attack on 25 March 2015 in Valencia.
