= Jesús Bonilla =

Spanish actor and film director

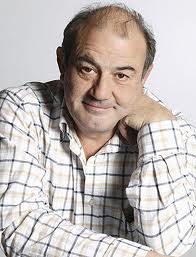
- Bonilla in 2013
- Born: 1 September 1955 (age 71); Madrid, Spain
- Occupation: Actor
- Years active: 1978-present

Jesús Bonilla (born 1 September 1955) is a Spanish actor. He has appeared in more than sixty films since 1978.

== Selected filmography ==
Year	Title	Role	Notes
1992	Belle Époque	El número	
1993	Kika	Policeman	
1994	All Men Are the Same	Alberto	(billed as Jesus Bonilla)
1995	Así en el cielo como en la tierra	Jesucristo	
1999	The Girl of Your Dreams	Marco Bonilla	
2000	La comunidad	Ricardo	Directed by Álex de la Iglesia
2002	Lisístrata	Cinesias	directed by Francesc Bellmunt
2016	La reina de España	Bonilla	
