= Roberto Cairo =

Spanish actor

- Born: Roberto Andrés Cairo Pablo; 3 May 1963; Madrid, Spain
- Died: 28 August 2014 (aged 51); Madrid, Spain
- Occupations: Film and television actor
- Years active: 1984–2014
- Notable credit: Cuéntame cómo pasó

Roberto Andrés Cairo Pablo (3 May 1963 – 28 August 2014) was a Spanish film and television actor. He appeared in various television series and films mostly as supporting actor, most notably as Desi in the TV series Cuéntame cómo pasó. He died on 28 August 2014 due to lung cancer.
