= List of Spanish films of 1989 =

A list of Spanish-produced and co-produced feature films released in Spain in 1995.

== Films ==
Release		Title (Domestic title)	Cast & Crew	Ref.
J A N U A R Y	17	Dawn Breaks, Which Is No Small Thing (Amanece, que no es poco)	Director: José Luis Cuerda Cast: Antonio Resines, Luis Ciges, Saza, Manuel Alexandre, Chus Lampreave, Cassen, María Isbert, Rafael Alonso, Violeta Cela, Gabino Diego, Ovidi Montllor, Miguel Rellán, Pastora Vega, Enrique San Francisco, Tito Valverde, Guillermo Montesinos	
J A N U A R Y	26	Esquilache	Director: Josefina Molina Cast: Fernando Fernán Gómez, José Luis López Vázquez, Ángela Molina, Ángel de Andrés, Concha Velasco, Adolfo Marsillach, Amparo Rivelles, Alberto Closas, Tito Valverde	
F E B R U A R Y	22	Un negre amb un saxo	Director: Francesc Bellmunt Cast: Patxi Bisquert, Rosana Pastor, Guillermo Montesinos, Ana Duato	
F E B R U A R Y	23	The Dark Night (La noche oscura)	Director: Carlos Saura Cast: Juan Diego, Julie Delpy, Fernando Guillén	
M A R C H	3	Lluvia de otoño	Director: José Ángel Rebolledo Cast: Kiel Martin, Mercedes Sampietro, Jane Badler, Mapi Galán, François-Éric Gendron, Jack Taylor	
A P R I L	11	Going South Shopping (Bajarse al moro)	Director: Fernando Colomo Cast: Verónica Forqué, Aitana Sánchez-Gijón, Antonio Banderas, Chus Lampreave, Miguel Rellán, Juan Echanove	
M A Y	11	Loco veneno	Director: Miguel Hermoso Cast: Maru Valdivielso, Pablo Carbonell, Antonio Resines, Emilio Gutiérrez Caba, Miguel Rellán, Víctor Cuica, Luis Prendes, Encarna Paso, Antonio Gamero, Manuel Alexandre	
M A Y	12	Moon Child (El niño de la luna)	Director: Agustí Villaronga Cast: Maribel Martín, Lisa Gerrard, Lucia Bosè, David Sust, Mary Carrillo, Günter Meisner, Heidi Ben Amar, Lydia Azzopardi, Jack Birkett	
M A Y	19	Guarapo	Director: Santiago Ríos, Teodoro Ríos Cast: Luis Suárez, Patricia Adriani, José Manuel Cervino, Juan Luis Galiardo, Julio Gavilanes	
M A Y	26	Pasión de hombre	Director: José Antonio de la Loma Cast: Anthony Quinn, Maud Adams, Ramón Sheen, Victoria Vera, Ray Walston, R. J. Williams, Elizabeth Ashley	
S E P T E M B E R	18	If They Tell You I Fell (Si te dicen que caí)	Director: Vicente Aranda Cast: Jorge Sanz, Victoria Abril, Antonio Banderas, Javier Gurruchaga, Lluís Homar, Guillermo Montesinos	
S E P T E M B E R	22	Blood and Sand (Sangre y arena)	Director: Javier Elorrieta Cast: Christopher Rydell, Sharon Stone, Ana Torrent, Guillermo Montesinos, Simón Andreu, José Luis de Vilallonga	
S E P T E M B E R	26	The Sea and Time (El mar y el tiempo)	Director: Fernando Fernán Gómez Cast: Rafaela Aparicio, José Soriano, Fernando Fernán Gómez, Aitana Sánchez-Gijón, Cristina Marsillach, Iñaki Miramón, Ramon Madaula, Eulàlia Ramon, Gabino Diego, Fernando Guillén Cuervo	
O C T O B E R	3	The Things of Love (Las cosas del querer)	Director: Jaime Chávarri Cast: Ángela Molina, Ángel de Andrés López, Manuel Bandera	

== See also ==
- 4th Goya Awards
