= Goya Award for Best Art Direction =

Annual award by the Spanish Film Academy

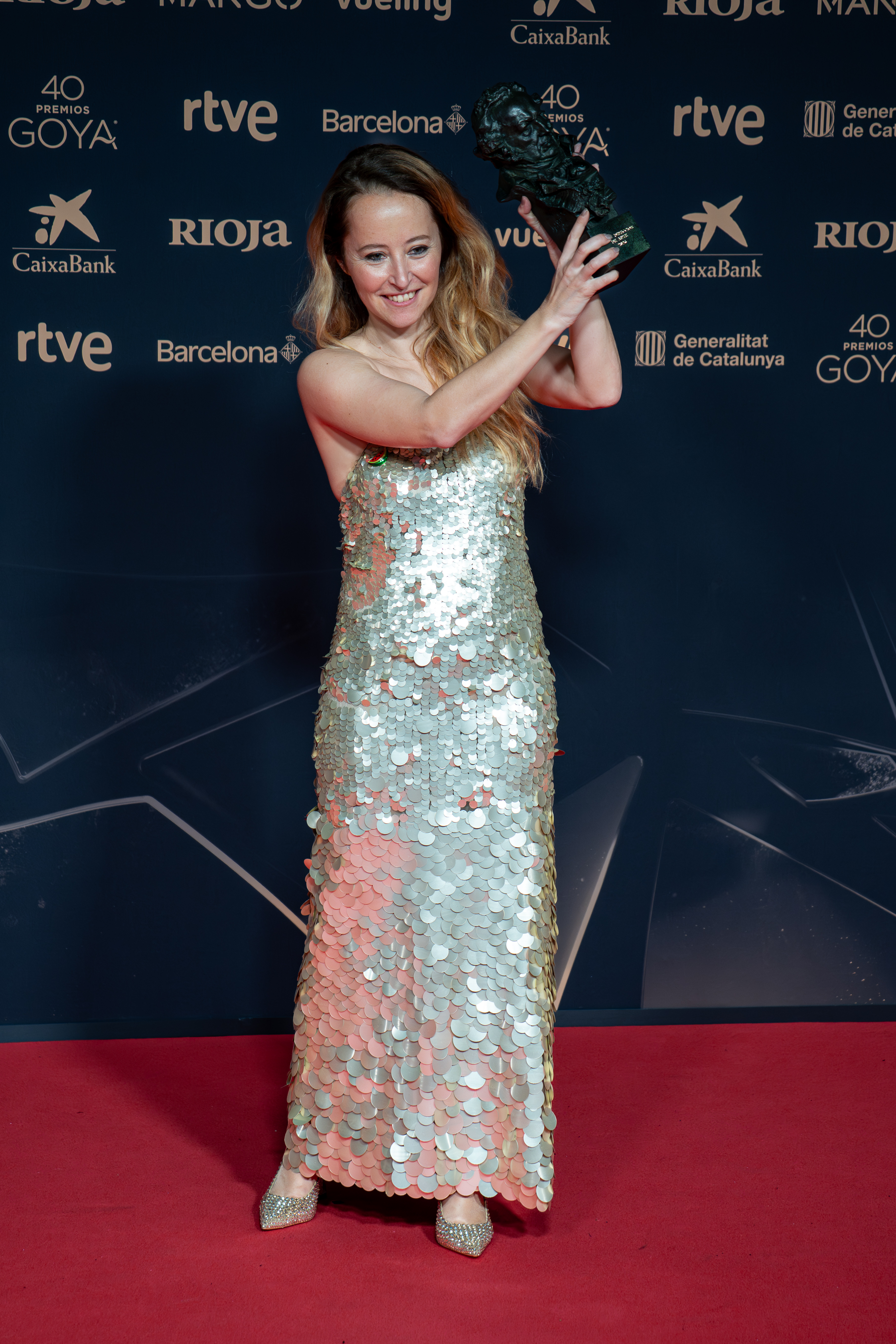
- The 2026 recipient: Laia Ateca Font
- Native name: Premio Goya a la mejor dirección artística
- Awarded for: Best art direction in a Spanish film of the year
- Country: Spain
- Presented by: Academy of Cinematographic Arts and Sciences of Spain (AACCE)
- First award: 1st Goya Awards (1986)
- Most recent winner: Laia Ateca Font; Sirāt (2025)
- Website: Official website

The Goya Award for Best Art Direction (Spanish: Premio Goya a la mejor dirección artística) is one of the Goya Awards presented annually by the Academy of Cinematographic Arts and Sciences of Spain (AACCE) since the awards debuted in 1986. Félix Murcia was the first winner of the award for his work in Dragon Rapide (1986).

Félix Murcia holds the record of the most awards in this category with five followed by Gil Parrondo with four wins.

== Winners and nominees ==
=== 1980s ===
Year	English title	Original title	Recipient(s)
1986 (1st)	Dragon Rapide		Félix Murcia
1986 (1st)	Bandera negra		Ramiro Gómez
1986 (1st)	Romanza final		Wolfgang Burmann
1987 (2nd)	The House of Bernarda Alba	La casa de Bernarda Alba	Rafael Palmero
1987 (2nd)	El bosque animado		Félix Murcia
1987 (2nd)	La monja alférez		Eduardo Torre de la Fuente
1988 (3rd)	Rowing with the Wind	Remando al viento	Wolfgang Burmann
1988 (3rd)	Berlín Blues		Gerardo Vera
1988 (3rd)	El Dorado		Terry Pritchard
1988 (3rd)	Jarrapellejos		Rafael Palmero
1988 (3rd)	Women on the Verge of a Nervous Breakdown	Mujeres al borde de un ataque de nervios	Félix Murcia
1989 (4th)	Esquilache		Ramiro Gómez and Javier Artiñano
1989 (4th)	Moon Child	El niño de la luna	Francisco Candini
1989 (4th)	If They Tell You I Fell	Si te dicen que caí	Josep Rosell
1989 (4th)	The Things of Love	Las cosas del querer	Luis Sanz
1989 (4th)	Twisted Obsession	El sueño del mono loco	Pierre-Louis Thévenet

=== 1990s ===
Year	English title	Original title	Recipient(s)
1990 (5th)	¡Ay Carmela!		Rafael Palmero
1990 (5th)	Tie Me Up! Tie Me Down!	¡Átame!	Ferrán Sánchez
1990 (5th)	The Most Natural Thing	Lo más natural	Rafael Palmero
1991 (6th)	The Dumbfounded King	El rey pasmado	Félix Murcia
1991 (6th)	Prince of Shadows	Beltenebros	Fernando Sáenz and Luis Vallés "Koldo"
1991 (6th)	Don Juan in Hell	Don Juan en los infiernos	Wolfgang Burmann
1992 (7th)	Belle Époque		Juan Botella
1992 (7th)	Acción mutante		José Luis Arrizabalaga
1992 (7th)	The Fencing Master	El maestro de esgrima	Luis Vallés "Koldo"
1993 (8th)	Banderas, the Tyrant	Tirano Banderas	Félix Murcia
1993 (8th)	Kika		Alain Bainee and Javier Fernández
1993 (8th)	Madregilda		Luis Vallés "Koldo"
1994 (9th)	Cradle Song	Canción de cuna	Gil Parrondo
1994 (9th)	Running Out of Time	Días contados	Félix Murcia
1994 (9th)	The Turkish Passion	La pasión turca	Josep Rosell
1995 (10th)	The Day of the Beast	El día de la bestia	José Luis Arrizabalaga and Arturo García "Biaffra"
1995 (10th)	The Flower of My Secret	La flor de mi secreto	Wolfgang Burmann
1995 (10th)	La leyenda de Balthasar el castrado		Javier Fernández
1996 (11th)	The Dog in the Manger	El perro del hortelano	Félix Murcia
1996 (11th)	La Celestina		Ana Alvargonzález
1996 (11th)	Tramway to Malvarrosa	Tranvía a la Malvarrosa	Pierre-Louis Thévenet
1997 (12th)	Secrets of the Heart	Secretos del corazón	Félix Murcia
1997 (12th)	The Color of the Clouds	El color de las nubes	Antonio Cortés
1997 (12th)	In Praise of Older Women	En brazos de una mujer madura	Josep Rosell
1998 (13th)	The Girl of Your Dreams	La niña de tus ojos	Gerardo Vera
1998 (13th)	Open Your Eyes	Abre los ojos	Wolfgang Burmann
1998 (13th)	The Grandfather	El abuelo	Gil Parrondo
1998 (13th)	Mararía		Félix Murcia
1999 (14th)	Goya in Bordeaux	Goya en Burdeos	Pierre-Louis Thévenet
1999 (14th)	Butterfly's Tongue	La lengua de las mariposas	Josep Rosell
1999 (14th)	All About My Mother	Todo sobre mi madre	Antxón Gómez
1999 (14th)	Volavérunt		Luis Vallés "Koldo"

=== 2000s ===
Year	English title	Original title	Recipient(s)
2000 (15th)	You're the One	You're the One (una historia de entonces)	Gil Parrondo
2000 (15th)	Lázaro de Tormes		Luis Ramírez
2000 (15th)	Common Wealth	La comunidad	José Luis Arrizabalaga "Arri" and Arturo García "Biaffra"
2000 (15th)	Kisses for Everyone	Besos para todos	Fernando Sáenz and Ulía Loureiro
2001 (16th)	The Others	Los otros	Benjamín Fernández
2001 (16th)	Intact	Intacto	César Macarrón
2001 (16th)	Mad Love	Juana la Loca	Josep Rosell
2001 (16th)	Don't Tempt Me	Sin noticias de Dios	Javier Fernández
2002 (17th)	The Shanghai Spell	El embrujo de Shanghai	Salvador Parra
2002 (17th)	The Impatient Alchemist	El alquimista impaciente	Rafael Palmero
2002 (17th)	Don Quixote, Knight Errant	El caballero Don Quijote	Félix Murcia
2002 (17th)	Story of a Kiss	Historia de un beso	Gil Parrondo
2003 (18th)	Mortadelo & Filemon: The Big Adventure	La gran aventura de Mortadelo y Filemón	César Macarrón
2003 (18th)	The Carpenter's Pencil	El lápiz del carpintero	Juan Pedro de Gaspar
2003 (18th)	Carmen		Benjamín Fernández
2003 (18th)	The End of a Mystery	La luz prodigiosa	Félix Murcia
2004 (19th)	Tiovivo c. 1950		Gil Parrondo
2004 (19th)	The 7th Day	El séptimo día	Rafael Palmero
2004 (19th)	Bad Education	La mala educación	Antxón Gómez
2004 (19th)	The Sea Inside	Mar adentro	Benjamín Fernández
2005 (20th)	Ninette		Gil Parrondo
2005 (20th)	Obaba		Julio Esteban and Julio Torrecilla
2005 (20th)	Something to Remember Me By	Para que no me olvides	Federico G. Gambero and Félix Murcia
2005 (20th)	Round Two	Segundo asalto	Marta Blasco
2006 (21st)	Alatriste		Benjamín Fernández
2006 (21st)	Pan's Labyrinth	El laberinto del fauno	Eugenio Caballero
2006 (21st)	The Borgia	Los Borgia	Bárbara Pérez Solero and María Stilde Ambruzzi
2006 (21st)	Volver		Salvador Parra
2007 (22nd)	The Orphanage	El orfanato	Josep Rosell
2007 (22nd)	13 Roses	Las 13 Rosas	Edou Hydallgo
2007 (22nd)	Sunday Light	Luz de domingo	Gil Parrondo
2007 (22nd)	Oviedo Express		Wolfgang Burmann
2008 (23rd)	Che, The Argentine	Che, el argentino	Antxón Gómez
2008 (23rd)	La Conjura de El Escorial		Luis Vallés "Koldo"
2008 (23rd)	The Blind Sunflowers	Los girasoles ciegos	Balter Gallart
2008 (23rd)	Blood in May	Sangre de mayo	Gil Parrondo
2009 (24th)	Agora	Ágora	Guy Hendrix Dyas
2009 (24th)	Cell 211	Celda 211	Antón Laguna
2009 (24th)	The Dancer and the Thief	El baile de la victoria	Verónica Astudillo
2009 (24th)	The Secret in Their Eyes	El secreto de sus ojos	Marcelo Pont

=== 2010s ===
Year	English title	Original title	Recipient(s)
2010 (25th)	Black Bread	Pa negre (Pan negro)	Ana Alvargonzález
2010 (25th)	The Last Circus	Balada triste de trompeta	Edou Hydallgo
2010 (25th)	Biutiful		Brigitte Broch
2010 (25th)	Lope		César Macarrón
2011 (26th)	Blackthorn		Juan Pedro de Gaspar
2011 (26th)	EVA		Laia Colet
2011 (26th)	The Skin I Live In	La piel que habito	Antxón Gómez
2011 (26th)	No Rest for the Wicked	No habrá paz para los malvados	Antón Laguna
2012 (27th)	Blancanieves		Alain Bainée
2012 (27th)	The Artist and the Model	El artista y la modelo	Pilar Revuelta
2012 (27th)	Unit 7	Grupo 7	Pepe Domínguez del Olmo
2012 (27th)	The Impossible	Lo imposible	Eugenio Caballero
2013 (28th)	Witching & Bitching	Las brujas de Zugarramurdi	José Luis Arrizabalaga and Arturo García "Biaffra"
2013 (28th)	Scorpion in Love	Alacrán enamorado	Llorenç Miquel
2013 (28th)	Cannibal	Caníbal	Isabel Viñuelas
2013 (28th)	Zip & Zap and the Marble Gang	Zipi y Zape y el club de la canica	Juan Pedro de Gaspar
2014 (29th)	Marshland	La isla mínima	Pepe Domínguez
2014 (29th)	Mortadelo and Filemon: Mission Implausible	Mortadelo y Filemón contra Jimmy el Cachondo	Víctor Monigote
2014 (29th)	El Niño		Antón Laguna
2014 (29th)	Autómata		Patrick Salvador
2015 (30th)	Palm Trees in the Snow	Palmeras en la nieve	Antón Laguna
2015 (30th)	The Bride	La novia	Jesús Bosqued Maté and Pilar Quintana
2015 (30th)	My Big Night	Mi gran noche	José Luis Arrizabalaga "Arri" and Arturo García "Biaffra"
2015 (30th)	Nobody Wants the Night	Nadie quiere la noche	Alain Bainée
2016 (31st)	A Monster Calls	Un monstruo viene a verme	Eugenio Caballero
2016 (31st)	1898, Our Last Men in the Philippines	1898, Los últimos de Filipinas	Carlos Bodelón
2016 (31st)	Smoke & Mirrors	El hombre de las mil caras	Pepe Domínguez del Olmo
2016 (31st)	The Queen of Spain	La reina de España	Juan Pedro de Gaspar
2017 (32nd)	Giant	Handia	Mikel Serrano
2017 (32nd)	Abracadabra		Alain Bainée
2017 (32nd)	The Bookshop	La librería	Llorenç Miquel
2017 (32nd)	Gold	Oro	Javier Fernández
2018 (33rd)	Gun City	La sombra de la ley	Juan Pedro de Gaspar
2018 (33rd)	The Photographer of Mauthausen	El fotógrafo de Mauthausen	Rosa Ros
2018 (33rd)	The Man Who Killed Don Quixote	Elhombre que mató a Don Quixote	Benjamín Fernández
2018 (33rd)	Superlópez		Balter Gallart
2019 (34th)	While at War	Mientras dure la guerra	Juan Pedro de Gaspar
2019 (34th)	Pain and Glory	Dolor y gloria	Antón Gómez
2019 (34th)	The Endless Trench	La trinchera infinita	Pepe Domínguez
2019 (34th)	Advantages of Travelling by Train	Ventajas de viajar en tren	Mikel Serrano

=== 2020s ===
Year	English title	Original title	Recipient(s)
2020 (35th)	Coven	Akelarre	Mikel Serrano
2020 (35th)	Adú		César Macarrón
2020 (35th)	Black Beach		Montse Sanz
2020 (35th)	Schoolgirls	Las niñas	Mónica Bernuy
2021 (36th)	Outlaws	Las leyes de la frontera	Balter Gallart
2021 (36th)	The Good Boss	El buen patrón	Cesar Macarrón
2021 (36th)	Parallel Mothers	Madres paralelas	Antxon Gómez
2021 (36th)	Maixabel		Mikel Serrano
2022 (37th)	Prison 77	Modelo 77	Pepe Domínguez del Olmo
2022 (37th)	Alcarràs		Mónica Bernuy
2022 (37th)	The Beasts	As bestas	José Tirado
2022 (37th)	Piety	La piedad	Melanie Antón
2022 (37th)	God's Crooked Lines	Los renglones torcidos de Dios	Sylvia Steinbrecht
2023 (38th)	Society of the Snow	La sociedad de la nieve	Alain Bainée
2023 (38th)	20,000 Species of Bees	20.000 especies de abejas	Izaskun Urkijo
2023 (38th)	Close Your Eyes	Cerrar los ojos	Curru Garabal
2023 (38th)	The Movie Teller	La contadora de películas	Carlos Conti
2023 (38th)	Jokes & Cigarettes	Saben aquell	Marc Pou
2024 (39th)	The Red Virgin	La virgen roja	Javier Alvariño
2024 (39th)	The 47	El 47	Marta Bazaco
2024 (39th)	The Room Next Door	La habitación de al lado	Inbal Weinberg
2024 (39th)	Saturn Return	Segundo premio	Pepe Domínguez del Olmo
2024 (39th)	The Other Way Around	Volveréis	Miguel Ángel Rebollo
2025 (40th)	Sirāt		Laia Ateca Font
2025 (40th)	The Captive	El cautivo	Juan Pedro de Gaspar
2025 (40th)	The Dinner	La cena	Koldo Vallés
2025 (40th)	Los Tigres		Pepe Domínguez del Olmo
2025 (40th)	Maspalomas		Mikel Serrano
