= 4th Goya Awards =

- Date: 10 March 1990
- Site: Palacio de Congresos de Madrid
- Hosted by: Carmen Maura and Andrés Pajares

Highlights
- Best Film: Twisted Obsession
- Best Actor: Jorge Sanz; If They Tell You I Fell
- Best Actress: Rafaela Aparicio; The Sea and Time
- Most awards: Twisted Obsession (6)
- Most nominations: Twisted Obsession and Esquilache (11)

Television coverage
- Network: TVE

The 4th Goya Awards were presented in Madrid, Spain, on 10 March 1990.

Twisted Obsession won the award for Best Film.

== Winners and nominees ==
Best Film: Twisted Obsession; Esquilache; Love, Hate and Death; Moon Child; The Sea and Time	Best Director: Fernando Trueba – Twisted Obsession; Vicente Aranda – If They Tell You I Fell; Fernando Fernán Gómez – The Sea and Time; Josefina Molina – Esquilache; Agustí Villaronga – Moon Child
Best Actor: Jorge Sanz – If They Tell You I Fell; Fernando Fernán Gómez – Esquilache; Fernando Fernán Gómez – The Sea and Time; Juan Diego – The Dark Night; Alfredo Landa – El río que nos lleva	Best Actress: Rafaela Aparicio – The Sea and Time; Victoria Abril – If They Tell You I Fell; Ana Belén – The Flight of the Dove; Verónica Forqué – Going South Shopping; Ángela Molina – The Things of Love
Best Supporting Actor: Adolfo Marsillach – Esquilache; Juan Echanove – The Flight of the Dove; Juan Luis Galiardo – The Flight of the Dove; Fernando Guillén – The Dark Night; Manuel Huete – The Flight of the Dove; Enrique San Francisco – El baile del pato	Best Supporting Actress: María Asquerino – The Sea and Time; María Barranco – The Things of Love; Chus Lampreave – Going South Shopping; Amparo Rivelles – Esquilache; Concha Velasco – Esquilache
Best Original Screenplay: Agustí Villaronga – Moon Child; José Luis Cuerda – Dawn Breaks, Which Is No Small Thing; Manuel Iborra – El baile del pato; Rafael Azcona, José Luis García Sánchez – The Flight of the Dove; Jaime Chávarri, Fernando Colomo, Lázaro Irazábal, Antonio Larreta – The Things of Love	Best Adapted Screenplay: Manolo Matji, Menno Meyjes, Fernando Trueba – Twisted Obsession; Josefina Molina, Joaquín Oristrell, José Sámano – Esquilache; Fernando Colomo, José Luis Alonso de Santos, Joaquín Oristrell – Going South Shopping; Vicente Aranda – If They Tell You I Fell; Fernando Fernán Gómez – The Sea and Time
Best New Director: Ana Díez – Ander eta Yul; Cristina Andreu – Brumal; Isabel Coixet – Too Old to Die Young; Santiago Ríos, Teodoro Ríos – Guarapo; Xavier Villaverde – Continental	Best Original Score: Paco de Lucía – Love, Hate and Death; José Nieto – Esquilache; Pata Negra – Going South Shopping; Gregorio García Segura – The Things of Love; Antoine Duhamel – Twisted Obsession
Best Cinematography: José Luis Alcaine – Twisted Obsession; Teodoro Escamilla – The Dark Night; Juan Amorós – Esquilache; Teodoro Escamilla – Love, Hate and Death; Jaume Peracaula – Moon Child	Best Editing: Carmen Frías – Twisted Obsession; Pedro del Rey – The Dark Night; José Antonio Rojo – Love, Hate and Death; Raúl Román – Moon Child; Pablo González del Amo – The Sea and Time
Best Art Direction: Javier Artiñano, Ramiro Gómez – Esquilache; Josep Rosell – If They Tell You I Fell; Francesc Candini – Moon Child; Luis Sanz – The Things of Love; Pierre-Louis Thévenet – Twisted Obsession	Best Production Supervision: José López Rodero – Twisted Obsession; Marisol Carnicero – Esquilache; Andrés Santana – Going South Shopping; Selma Baccar, Adolfo Cora, Jaime Fernández-Cid, Chattab Garbi, Francisco Villar – Moon Child; Andrés Santana – The Sea and Time
Best Sound: Antonio Bloch, Francisco Peramos, Manuel Cora – Love, Hate and Death; Carlos Faruolo, Francisco Peramos, Manuel Cora – Dawn Breaks, Which Is No Small Thing; Miguel Ángel Polo, Enrique Molinero – Going South Shopping; Gilles Ortion, Eduardo Fernández – The Sea and Time; Georges Prat, Pablo Blanco, Eduardo Fernández – Twisted Obsession; Gilles Ortion, Carlos Faruolo – The Dark Night	Best Special Effects: Colin Arthur, Basilio Cortijo, Carlo De Marchis – The Rift; Reyes Abades, Ángel Alonso, Basilio Cortijo, Emilio Ruiz del Río – Moon Child; Reyes Abades – Dawn Breaks, Which Is No Small Thing; Reyes Abades – The Dark Night; Christian Bourqui – Twisted Obsession
Best Costume Design: Montse Amenós, Isidre Prunés – Moon Child; Ana Alvargonzález – The Dark Night; Marcelo Grande – If They Tell You I Fell; Alfonso Barajas – Love, Hate and Death; José María García Montes, María Luisa Zabala – The Things of Love	Best Makeup and Hairstyles: José Antonio Sánchez, Paquita Núñez – Moon Child; Juan Pedro Hernández, Jesús Moncusi – The Sea and Time; José Antonio Sánchez, Paquita Núñez – Twisted Obsession; Romana González, José Antonio Sánchez, Mercedes Guillot, Josefa Morales – The Dark Night; Gregorio Ros, Jesús Moncusi – The Things of Love; Romana González, Josefa Morales – Love, Hate and Death; Chass Llach, Poli López – If They Tell You I Fell
Best Animated Film: Town Musicians of Bremen	Best Short Film: El reino de Víctor; El número marcado; Kilómetro cero: la partida
Best Spanish Language Foreign Film: La Bella del Alhambra • Cuba; Aventurera • Venezuela

== Honorary Goya ==
- Victoriano López García
