= List of LGBTQ-related films of 1989 =

This is a list of lesbian, gay, bisexual, transgender or queer-related films released in 1989. It contains theatrically released films that deal with important gay, lesbian, bisexual, transgender or queer characters or issues and may have same-sex romance or relationships as a plot device.

== Films ==
Title	Director	Country	Genre	Cast	Notes
Acılar Paylaşılmaz	Eser Zorlu	Turkey	Drama	Kadir Inanir, Betül Aytaç, Kerem Tunaboylu and Osman Gidisoglu	
Coming Out	Heiner Carow	East Germany	Romance, drama	Matthias Freihof, Dagmar Manzel, Dirk Kummer, Michael Gwisdek, Werner Dissel, Gudrun Ritter, Walfriede Schmitt, Axel Wandtke, Pierre Bliss, René Schmidt, Thomas Gumpert, Ursula Staack, Robert Hummel and Horst Ziethen	Coming Out was the winner of the Teddy Award for best feature film at the 40th Berlin International Film Festival.
Common Threads: Stories from the Quilt	Rob Epstein, Jeffrey Friedman	United States	Documentary	Dustin Hoffman (narrator)	About the NAMES Project AIDS Memorial Quilt; won the Academy Award for Best Documentary Feature in 1990.
Dead Poets Society	Peter Weir	United States	Drama	Robin Williams, Robert Sean Leonard, Ethan Hawke, Josh Charles, Gale Hansen, Norman Lloyd, Kurtwood Smith, Dylan Kussman, James Waterston, Allelon Ruggiero, Alexandra Powers, Leon Pownall and George Martin	
Fun Down There	Roger Stigliano	United States	Drama	Yvonne Fisher, Martin Goldin, Nickolas B. Nagourney, Jeanne Smith, Gretchen Sommerville, Betty Waite, Harold Waite and Michael Waite	
Identity Crisis	Melvin Van Peebles	United States	Comedy	Mario Van Peebles	
Justine's Film	Jeanne Crépeau	Canada	Drama, Short	Marie-Hélène Montpetit	a.k.a. Le film de Justine
The Things of Love	Jaime Chávarri	Spain	Musical	Ángela Molina, Ángel de Andrés López, Manuel Bandera, María Barranco, Amparo Baró, Mary Carmen Ramírez, Diana Peñalver, Juan Gea, Rafael Alonso, Eva León, Ana Sáinz, Manuel Gallardo, Mari Paz Ballesteros (as Mª Paz Ballesteros), María Rus and Antonio Canal (as Tony Canal)	a.k.a. Las cosas del querer
Last Exit to Brooklyn	Uli Edel	United States; United Kingdom; West Germany	Crime, drama	Stephen Lang, Jennifer Jason Leigh, Burt Young, Peter Dobson, Jerry Orbach, Stephen Baldwin, Jason Andrews, James Lorinz, Sam Rockwell, Maia Danziger, Camille Saviola, Ricki Lake, Cameron Johann, John Costelloe, Christopher Murney, Alexis Arquette, Mark Boone Junior and Rutanya Alda	Based on the novel of the same name by Hubert Selby Jr.
Longtime Companion	Norman René	United States	Romance, drama	Campbell Scott, Patrick Cassidy, John Dossett, Mary-Louise Parker, Stephen Caffrey, Welker White, Bruce Davison, Mark Lamos, Dermot Mulroney, Michael Schoeffling, Brian Cousins, Annie Golden, Brent Barrett, Dan Butler, Robi Martin, Robert Joy, Tony Shalhoub, David Drake, Michael Carmine and Melora Creager	First wide-release film to deal with the subject of AIDS
The Long Weekend (O' Despair)	Gregg Araki	United States	Drama	Bretton Vail, Maureen Dondanville, Andrea Beane, Nicole Dillenberg, Marcus D'Amico and Lance Woods	Winner of the Ernest Artaria Award at the 1989 Locarno International Film Festival.
Looking for Langston	Isaac Julien	United Kingdom	Drama	Ben Ellison, Matthew Baidoo, Akim Mogaji, John Wilson, Dencil Williams, Guy Burgess, James Dublin, Harry Donaldson, Jimmy Somerville, Stuart Hall and Langston Hughes	Memoriam to Langston Hughes and the Harlem Renaissance, winner of the Teddy Award at the 39th Berlin International Film Festival
The Rainbow	Ken Russell	United Kingdom; United States	Action, drama, romance	Sammi Davis, Paul McGann, Amanda Donohoe, Christopher Gable, David Hemmings, Glenda Jackson, Dudley Sutton, Jim Carter, Judith Paris, Kenneth Colley, Glenda McKay, Mark Owen, Ralph Nossek, Nicola Stephenson, Molly Russell, Alan Edmondson, Rupert Russell, Richard Platt, Bernard Latham, John Tams, Zoe Brown, Amy Evans and Sam McMullen	Adapted from the novel of the same name by D. H. Lawrence
Salut Victor	Anne Claire Poirier	Canada	Drama	Jean Besré, Muriel Dutil, Jacques Godin, Juliette Huot, Marthe Nadeau, Huguette Oligny, Jean-Louis Roux and Julie Vincent	Based on the short story Matthew and Chauncy by Edward O. Phillips
Scenes from the Class Struggle in Beverly Hills	Paul Bartel	United States	Comedy	Jacqueline Bisset, Ray Sharkey, Mary Woronov, Robert Beltran, Ed Begley Jr., Wallace Shawn, Arnetia Walker, Paul Bartel, Paul Mazursky, Rebecca Schaeffer, Barret Oliver, Edith Diaz, Susan Saiger, Jerry Tondo and Michael Feinstein	
Sleepaway Camp III: Teenage Wasteland	Michael A. Simpson	United States	Slasher	Pamela Springsteen, Tracy Griffith	a.k.a. Nightmare Vacation III
Tongues Untied	Marlon Riggs	United States	Documentary	Marlon Riggs, Essex Hemphill and Brian Freeman	
The Unbelievable Truth	Hal Hartley	United States	Comedy, drama	Adrienne Shelly, Robert John Burke (credited as Robert Burke)	
Via Appia	Jochen Hick	Germany	Adventure, drama, romance	Peter Senner, Guilherme de Pádua (credited as Guilherme de Padua), Yves Jansen, Margarita Schmidt, José Carlos Berenguer and Gustavo Motta	
