= Twisted Obsession =

1989 film by Fernando Trueba

- Theatrical release poster
- Spanish: El sueño del mono loco
- Directed by: Fernando Trueba
- Written by: Fernando Trueba; Manolo Matji; Menno Meyjes
- Based on: The Dream of the Mad Monkey by Christopher Frank
- Produced by: Andrés Vicente Gómez
- Starring: Jeff Goldblum; Miranda Richardson; Anémone; Daniel Ceccaldi; Dexter Fletcher; Liza Walker
- Cinematography: José Luis Alcaine
- Edited by: Carmen Frías
- Music by: Antoine Duhamel
- Production companies: Iberoamericana; French Production; International Production; Sofica Valor
- Release date: September 1989 (Venice)
- Running time: 103 min.
- Countries: Spain; France
- Language: English

Twisted Obsession (Spanish: El sueño del mono loco; lit. 'The Dream of the Mad Monkey') is a 1989 Spanish-French erotic thriller directed by Fernando Trueba and starring Jeff Goldblum and Miranda Richardson. It is an adaptation of the 1976 novel The Dream of the Mad Monkey (Le rêve du singe fou) by Christopher Frank.

== Plot ==
Screenwriter Dan Gillis becomes involved with a young incestuous brother and sister.

== Cast ==
- Jeff Goldblum as Dan Gillis
- Miranda Richardson as Marilyn
- Anémone as Marianne
- Daniel Ceccaldi as Julien Legrand
- Dexter Fletcher as Malcolm Greene
- Liza Walker as Jenny
- Jerome Natali as Danny
- Arielle Dombasle as Marion
- Asunción Balaguer as Juana

== Production ==
The screenplay was penned by Trueba, Manolo Matji and Menno Meyjes. Shot in English, the film is a Spanish-French co-production, produced by Iberoamericana in association with French Production, International Production and Sofica Valor. Shooting took place in Paris and Madrid.

== Release ==
The film screened at the 46th Venice International Film Festival in September 1989.

== Accolades ==
Year	Award	Category	Nominee(s)	Result	Ref.
1990	4th Goya Awards	Best Film		Won	
1990	4th Goya Awards	Best Director	Fernando Trueba	Won	
1990	4th Goya Awards	Best Art Direction	Pierre-Louis Thévenet	Nominated	
1990	4th Goya Awards	Best Production Supervision	José López Rodero	Won	
1990	4th Goya Awards	Best Cinematography	José Luis Alcaine	Won	
1990	4th Goya Awards	Best Adapted Screenplay	Fernando Trueba, Manolo Matji, Menno Meyjes	Won	
1990	4th Goya Awards	Best Makeup and Hairstyles	José Antonio Sánchez, Paquita Núñez	Nominated	
1990	4th Goya Awards	Best Editing	Carmen Frías	Won	
1990	4th Goya Awards	Best Original Score	Antoine Duhamel	Nominated	
1990	4th Goya Awards	Best Sound	Eduardo Fernández, Georges Prat, Pablo Blanco	Nominated	
1990	4th Goya Awards	Special Effects	Christian Bourqui	Nominated	
