= The Sea and Time =

- Spanish: El mar y el tiempo
- Directed by: Fernando Fernán Gómez
- Screenplay by: Fernando Fernán Gómez
- Based on: El mar y el tiempo by Fernando Fernán Gómez
- Starring: Rafaela Aparicio; José Soriano; Fernando Fernán Gómez; Aitana Sánchez Gijón; Cristina Marsillach; Iñaki Miramón; Ramon Madaula; Eulalia Ramon; Gabino Diego; Fernando Guillén Cuervo; Emma Cohen; Manuel Alexandre; María Asquerino
- Cinematography: José Luis Alcaine
- Edited by: Pablo G. del Amo
- Music by: Mariano Díaz
- Production company: Ion Films
- Distributed by: United International Pictures
- Release dates: September 1989 (Zinemaldia); 26 September 1989 (Spain)
- Country: Spain
- Language: Spanish

The Sea and Time (Spanish: El mar y el tiempo) is a 1989 Spanish drama film directed and written by Fernando Fernán Gómez based on his novel of the same name.

== Plot ==
Jesús, the protagonist, is a Spaniard exiled in Argentina who returns to Spain in the spring of 1968 in order to reunite with his family. However, things have changed and the family that awaits him in Spain is very different from the one he left before leaving for Argentina.

== Cast ==
- Rafaela Aparicio as Abuela
- José Soriano as Jesús
- Fernando Fernán Gómez as Eusebio
- Aitana Sánchez-Gijón as Mer
- Iñaki Miramón as Anselmo
- Ramon Madaula as Mariano
- Eulalia Ramón
- Fernando Guillén Cuervo as Pepe
- Gabino Diego as Basilio
- María Asquerino as Marcela

== Release ==
The film screened at the 37th San Sebastián International Film Festival in September 1989. Distributed by United International Pictures, the film was released theatrically in Spain on 26 September 1989.

== Reception ==
Ángel Fernández-Santos of El País considered that Fernán-Gómez delivered "a new lesson in complexity disguised as simplicity".

== Accolades ==
Year	Award	Category	Nominee(s)	Result	Ref.
1990	4th Goya Awards	Best Film		Nominated	
1990	4th Goya Awards	Best Director	Fernando Fernán-Gómez	Nominated	
1990	4th Goya Awards	Best Adapted Screenplay	Fernando Fernán-Gómez	Nominated	
1990	4th Goya Awards	Best Actress	Rafaela Aparicio	Won	
1990	4th Goya Awards	Best Actor	Fernando Fernán-Gómez	Nominated	
1990	4th Goya Awards	Best Supporting Actress	María Asquerino	Won	
1990	4th Goya Awards	Best Editing	Pablo del Amo	Nominated	
1990	4th Goya Awards	Best Makeup and Hairstyles	Jesús Moncusi, Juan Pedro Hernández	Nominated	
1990	4th Goya Awards	Best Production Supervision	Andrés Santana	Nominated	
1990	4th Goya Awards	Best Sound	Eduardo Fernández, Gilles Ortion	Nominated	

The film also obtained the Special Jury Prize at the 1989 San Sebastián International Film Festival.

== See also ==
- List of Spanish films of 1989
