= Goya Award for Best Makeup and Hairstyles =

Annual award by the Spanish Film Academy

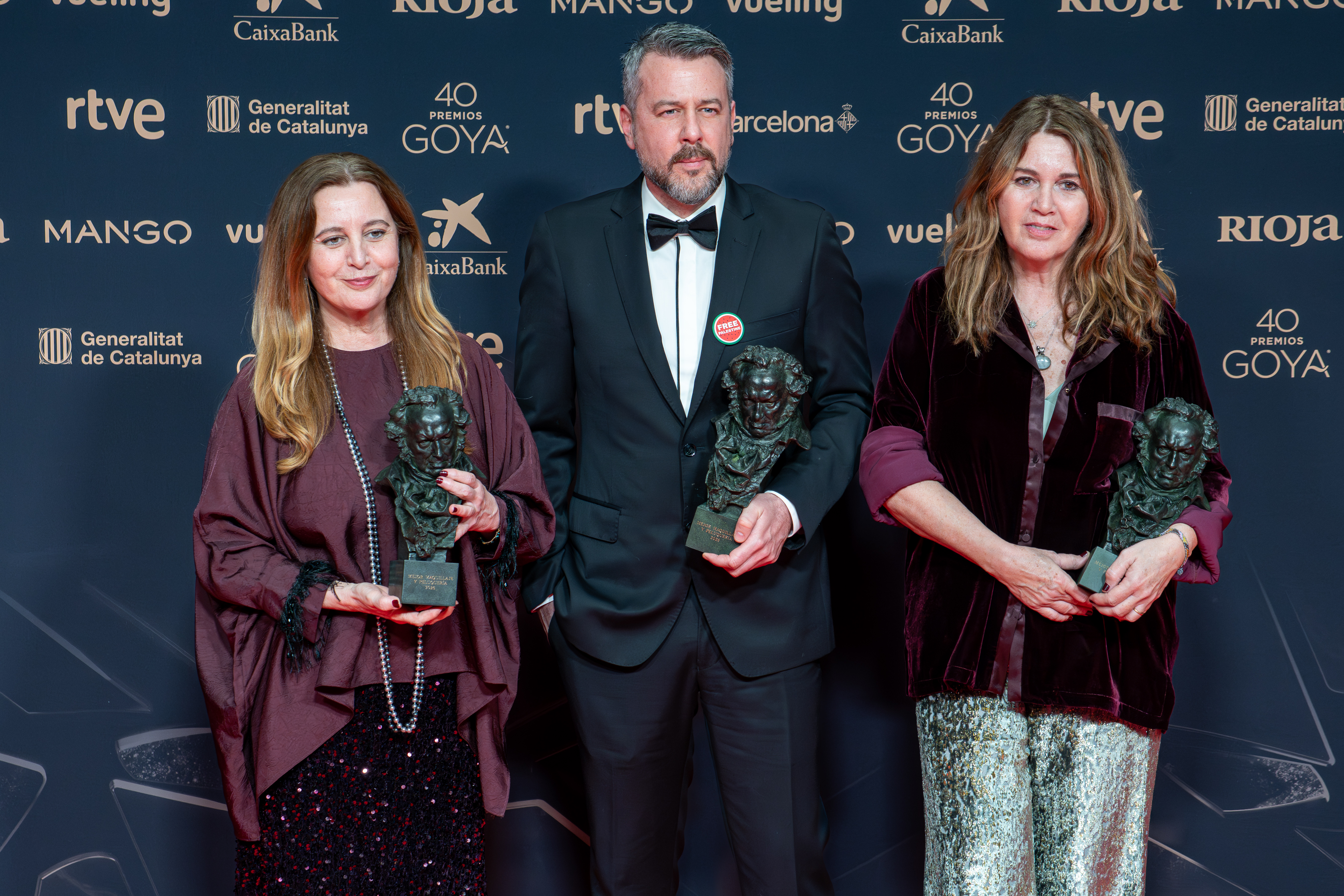
- The 2026 recipients: Belén López-Puigcerver, Nacho Díaz, and Ana López-Puigcerver
- Native name: Premio Goya al mejor maquillaje y peluquería
- Awarded for: Best makeup and hairstyles in a Spanish film of the year
- Country: Spain
- Presented by: Academy of Cinematographic Arts and Sciences of Spain (AACCE)
- First award: 1st Goya Awards (1986)
- Most recent winner: Ana López-Puigcerver, Belén López-Puigcerver, Nacho Díaz; The Captive (2025)
- Website: Official website

The Goya Award for Best Makeup and Hairstyles (Spanish: Premio Goya al mejor maquillaje y peluquería) is one of the Goya Awards presented annually by the Academy of Cinematographic Arts and Sciences of Spain (AACCE) since the awards debuted in 1986. Fernando Florido was the first winner for his work in Dragon Rapide (1986).

José Quetglas holds the record of the most wins in this category with seven, followed by José Antonio Sánchez with five wins. At the European Film Awards, Yolanda Piña, Félix Terrero and Nacho Díaz received the award for Best Makeup and Hairstyling for The Endless Trench (2020).

== Winners and nominees ==
=== 1980s ===
| Year | English title | Original title | Recipient(s) |
|---|---|---|---|
| 1986 (1st) | Dragon Rapide | | Fernando Florido |
| 1986 (1st) | Voyage to Nowhere | El viaje a ninguna parte | José Antonio Sánchez |
| 1987 (2nd) | Not awarded | | |
| 1988 (3rd) | Rowing with the Wind | Remando al viento | Romana González and Josefa Morales |
| 1988 (3rd) | El Dorado | | José Antonio Sánchez and Paquita Núñez |
| 1988 (3rd) | El Lute II: Tomorrow I'll be Free | El Lute II: mañana seré libre | Agustín Caviedes and Juan Pedro Hernández |
| 1988 (3rd) | Wait for Me in Heaven | Espérame en el cielo | Alicia Regueiro and Ángel Luis de Diego |
| 1988 (3rd) | Women on the Verge of a Nervous Breakdown | Mujeres al borde de un ataque de nervios | Jesús Moncusi and Gregorio Ros |
| 1989 (4th) | Moon Child | El niño de la luna | José Antonio Sánchez and Paquita Núñez |
| 1989 (4th) | The Dark Night | La noche oscura | Ana Alvargonzález |
| 1989 (4th) | The Things of Love | Las cosas de querer | José María García Montes and María Luisa Zabala |
| 1989 (4th) | Love, Hate and Death | Montoyas y Tarantos | Alfonso López Barajas |
| 1989 (4th) | If They Tell You I Fell | Si te dicen que caí | Marcelo Grandes |

=== 1990s ===
| Year | English title | Original title | Recipient(s) |
|---|---|---|---|
| 1990 (5th) | ¡Ay Carmela! | | José Antonio Sánchez and Paquita Núñez |
| 1990 (5th) | Tie Me Up! Tie Me Down! | ¡Átame! | Jesús Moncusi and Juan Pedro Hernández |
| 1990 (5th) | Yo soy ésa | | Juan Pedro Hernández and Leonardo Strafacio |
| 1991 (6th) | The Dumbfounded King | El rey pasmado | Romana González and Josefa Morales |
| 1991 (6th) | Prince of Shadows | Beltenebros | Juan Pedro Hernández |
| 1991 (6th) | High Heels | Tacones lejanos | Gregorio Ros and Jesús Moncusi |
| 1992 (7th) | Acción mutante | | Paca Almenara |
| 1992 (7th) | Belle Époque | | Ana Ferreira and Ana Lorena |
| 1992 (7th) | The Fencing Master | El maestro de esgrima | Josefa Morales and Romana González |
| 1993 (8th) | Banderas, the Tyrant | Tirano Banderas | Solange Aumaitre and Magdalena Álvarez |
| 1993 (8th) | Kika | | Gregorio Ros and Jesús Moncusi |
| 1993 (8th) | Madregilda | | María del Mar Paradela and Odile Fourquin |
| 1994 (9th) | Cradle Song | Canción de cuna | José Antonio Sánchez and Paquita Núñez |
| 1994 (9th) | Running Out of Time | Días contados | Josefa Morales and Romana González |
| 1994 (9th) | The Turkish Passion | La pasión turca | Juan Pedro Hernández and Manolo Carretero |
| 1995 (10th) | The Day of the Beast | El día de la bestía | José Quetglas, José Antonio Sánchez and Mercedes Guillot |
| 1995 (10th) | The Flower of My Secret | La flor de mi secreto | Antonio Panizza and Juan Pedro Hernández |
| 1995 (10th) | Nobody Will Speak of Us When We're Dead | Nadie hablará de nosotras cuando hayamos muerto | Ana Lozano, Carlos Paradela and Jesús Moncusi |
| 1996 (11th) | The Dog in the Manger | El perro del hortelano | Juan Pedro Hernández, Esther Martín and Mercedes Paradela |
| 1996 (11th) | La Celestina | | Alicia López Medina and Paca Almenara |
| 1996 (11th) | Libertarias | | Ana Lozano, Esther Martín, Juan Pedro Hernández and Manolo García |
| 1997 (12th) | Perdita Durango | | José Quetglas and Mercedes Guillot |
| 1997 (12th) | La herida luminosa | | Cristóbal Criado and Alicia López Medina |
| 1997 (12th) | The Disappearance of Garcia Lorca | Muerte en Granada | Francisca Guillot and Miguel Sesé |
| 1998 (13th) | The Girl of Your Dreams | La niña de tus ojos | Gregorio Ros and Antonio Panizza |
| 1998 (13th) | Open Your Eyes | Abre los ojos | Paca Almenara, Colin Arthur and Sylvie Imbert |
| 1998 (13th) | The Grandfather | El abuelo | Cristóbal Criado and Alicia López |
| 1998 (13th) | The Stolen Years | Los años bárbaros | José Quetglás and Mercedes Guillot |
| 1999 (14th) | Goya in Bordeaux | Goya en Burdeos | José Quetglas, Susana Sánchez and Blanca Sánchez |
| 1999 (14th) | Butterfly's Tongue | La lengua de las mariposas | Ana López Puigcerver and Teresa Rabal |
| 1999 (14th) | All About My Mother | Todo sobre mi madre | Juan Pedro Hernández and Jean-Jacques Puchu |
| 1999 (14th) | Volavérunt | | Lourdes Briones, Paillette, Manolo Carretero and Annie Marandin |

=== 2000s ===
| Year | English title | Original title | Recipient(s) |
|---|---|---|---|
| 2000 (15th) | Kisses for Everyone | Besos para todos | Romana González and Josefa Morales |
| 2000 (15th) | Common Wealth | La comunidad | José Quetglás and Mercedes Guillot |
| 2000 (15th) | Lázaro de Tormes | | Juan Pedro Hernández and Esther Martín |
| 2000 (15th) | You're the One | You're the One (una historia de entonces) | Paca Almenara and Antonio Panizza |
| 2001 (16th) | Mad Love | Juana la Loca | Miguel Sesé and Mercedes Guillot |
| 2001 (16th) | Buñuel y la mesa del rey Salomón | | Concha Martí and Ruth García |
| 2001 (16th) | The Others | Los otros | Ana López-Puigcerver and Belén López-Puigcerver |
| 2001 (16th) | Don't Tempt Me | Sin noticias de Dios | Ana Lozano, Antonio Panizza and Manolo García |
| 2002 (17th) | The Shanghai Spell | El embrujo de Shanghai | Gregorio Ros and Pepito Juez |
| 2002 (17th) | Story of a Kiss | Historia de un beso | Paca Almenara, Alicia López and Antonio Panizza |
| 2002 (17th) | Lisístrata | | Gemma Planchadell and Mónica Núñez |
| 2002 (17th) | Trece campanadas | | Susana Sánchez and Manolo Carretero |
| 2003 (18th) | Mortadelo & Filemon: The Big Adventure | La gran aventura de Mortadelo y Filemón | José Antonio Sánchez and Paquita Núñez |
| 2003 (18th) | Carmen | | Miguel Sesé and Natalia Sesé |
| 2003 (18th) | Danube Hotel | Hotel Danubio | Cristóbal Criado and Alicia López |
| 2003 (18th) | Noviembre | | Karmele Soler and Francisco Rodríguez |
| 2004 (19th) | The Sea Inside | Mar adentro | Jo Allen, Ana López Puigcerver, Mara Collazo and Manolo García |
| 2004 (19th) | Inconscientes | | Karmele Soler |
| 2004 (19th) | Tiovivo c. 1950 | | Paca Almenara and Alicia López |
| 2004 (19th) | Seres queridos | | Susana Sánchez and Patricia Rodríguez |
| 2005 (20th) | Camarón: When Flamenco Became Legend | Camarón | Romana González and Josefa Morales |
| 2005 (20th) | El Calentito | | Fermín Galán and Jorge Hernández |
| 2005 (20th) | Les Dalton | | Annie Marandin and Paillette |
| 2005 (20th) | Princesas | | Carlos Hernández and Manolo García |
| 2006 (21st) | Pan's Labyrinth | El laberinto del fauno | José Quetglas and Blanca Sánchez |
| 2006 (21st) | Alatriste | | José Luis Pérez |
| 2006 (21st) | Goya's Ghosts | Los fantasmas de Goya | Vana Primorac, Manuel García, María Carmen Clavel, Mercedes Guillot and Susana Sánchez |
| 2006 (21st) | Volver | | Ana Lozano and Máximo Gattabrusi |
| 2007 (22nd) | The Orphanage | El orfanato | Lola López and Itziar Arrieta |
| 2007 (22nd) | The Heart of the Earth | El corazón de la tierra | José Quetglás and Blanca Sánchez |
| 2007 (22nd) | 13 Roses | Las 13 Rosas | Almudena Fonseca, José Juez and Mariló Osuna |
| 2007 (22nd) | Oviedo Express | | Lourdes Briones and Fermín Galán |
| 2008 (23rd) | Mortadelo and Filemon. Mission: Save the Planet | Mortadelo y Filemón. Misión: salvar la Tierra | José Quetglas, Nieves Sánchez and Mar Paradela |
| 2008 (23rd) | La Conjura de El Escorial | | José Quetglás and Nieves Sánchez |
| 2008 (23rd) | The Blind Sunflowers | Los girasoles ciegos | Fermín Galán and Sylvie Imbert |
| 2008 (23rd) | Sangre de mayo | | Alicia López, Josefa Morales and Romana González |
| 2009 (24th) | Agora | Ágora | Jan Sewell and Suzanne Stokes-Munton |
| 2009 (24th) | Cell 211 | Celda 211 | Raquel Fidalgo and Inés Rodríguez |
| 2009 (24th) | El cónsul de Sodoma | | José Antonio Sánchez and Paquita Núñez |
| 2009 (24th) | Broken Embraces | Los abrazos rotos | Ana Lozano and Massimo Gattabrusi |

=== 2010s ===
| Year | English title | Original title | Recipient(s) |
|---|---|---|---|
| 2010 (25th) | The Last Circus | Balada triste de trompeta | José Quetglas, Nieves Sánchez and Pedro Rodríguez "Pedrati" |
| 2010 (25th) | Lope | | Karmele Soler, Martín Macías Trujillo and Paco Rodríguez |
| 2010 (25th) | Black Bread | Pa negre (Pan negro) | Alma Casal and Satur Merino |
| 2010 (25th) | Even the Rain | También la lluvia | Karmele Soler and Paco Rodríguez |
| 2011 (26th) | The Skin I Live In | La piel que habito | Karmele Soler, David Martí and Manolo Carretero |
| 2011 (26th) | Blackthorn | | Ana López-Puigcerver and Belén López-Puigcerver |
| 2011 (26th) | EVA | | Concha Rodríguez and Jesús Martos |
| 2011 (26th) | No Rest for the Wicked | No habrá paz para los malvados | Montse Boqueras, Nacho Díaz and Sergio Pérez |
| 2012 (27th) | Blancanieves | | Sylvie Imbert and Fermín Galán |
| 2012 (27th) | The Artist and the Model | El artista y la modelo | Sylvie Imbert and Noé Montes |
| 2012 (27th) | Unit 7 | Grupo 7 | Yolanda Piña |
| 2012 (27th) | The Impossible | Lo imposible | Alessandro Bertolazzi, David Martí and Montse Ribé |
| 2013 (28th) | Witching & Bitching | Las brujas de Zugarramurdi | María Dolores Gómez Castro, Javier Hernández Valentín, Pedro Rodríguez "Pedrati" and Francisco J. Rodríguez Frías |
| 2013 (28th) | Three Many Weddings | 3 bodas de más | Eli Adánez and Sergio Pérez |
| 2013 (28th) | Grand Piano | | Ana López-Puigcerver and Belén López-Puigcerver |
| 2013 (28th) | Family United | Lla gran familia española | Lola López and Itziar Arrieta |
| 2014 (29th) | Shrew's Nest | Musarañas | Carmen Veinat, José Quetglas and Pedro Rodríguez "Pedrati" |
| 2014 (29th) | Marshland | La isla mínima | Yolanda Piña |
| 2014 (29th) | El Niño | | David Martí, Noé Montes and Raquel Fidalgo |
| 2014 (29th) | Wild Tales | Relatos salvajes | Marisa Amenta and Néstor Burgos |
| 2015 (30th) | Nobody Wants the Night | Nadie quiere la noche | Sylvie Imbert, Paco Rodríguez and Pablo Perona |
| 2015 (30th) | Ma Ma | | Ana Lozano, Fito Dellibarda and Massimo Gattabrusi |
| 2015 (30th) | The Bride | La novia | Esther Guillem and Pilar Guillem |
| 2015 (30th) | Palm Trees in the Snow | Palmeras en la nieve | Karmele Soler, Alicia López, Pedro de Diego and Manolo García |
| 2016 (31st) | A Monster Calls | Un monstruo viene a verme | David Martí and Marese Langan |
| 2016 (31st) | 1898, Our Last Men in the Philippines | 1898, Los últimos de Filipinas | Milu Cabrer, Alicia López and Pedro Rodríguez "Pedrati" |
| 2016 (31st) | Smoke & Mirrors | El hombre de las mil caras | Yolanda Piña |
| 2016 (31st) | Julieta | | Ana López-Puigcerver, Sergio Pérez Berbel and David Martí |
| 2017 (32nd) | Giant | Handia | Ainhoa Eskisabel, Olga Cruz and Gorka Aguirre |
| 2017 (32nd) | Abracadabra | | Sylvie Imbert and Paco Rodríguez |
| 2017 (32nd) | Gold | Oro | Eli Adánez, Sergio Pérez Berbel and Pedro de Diego |
| 2017 (32nd) | Skins | Pieles | Lola Gómez, Jesús Gil and Óscar del Monte |
| 2018 (33rd) | The Man Who Killed Don Quixote | El hombre que mató a Don Quixote | Sylvie Imbert, Amparo Sánchez and Pablo Perona |
| 2018 (33rd) | The Photographer of Mauthausen | El fotógrafo de Mauthausen | Caitlin Acheson, Jesús Martos and Pablo Perona |
| 2018 (33rd) | Gun City | La sombra de la ley | Raquel Fidalgo, Noé Montés and Alberto Hortas |
| 2018 (33rd) | Quién te cantará | Quién te cantará | Rafael Mora and Anabel Beato |
| 2019 (34th) | While at War | Mientras dure la guerra | Ana López-Puigcerver, Belén López-Puigcerver and Nacho Díaz |
| 2019 (34th) | Pain and Glory | Dolor y gloria | Ana Lozano, Sergio Pérez Berbel and Montse Ribé |
| 2019 (34th) | The Endless Trench | La trichera infinita | Yolanda Piña, Félix Terrero and Nacho Díaz |
| 2019 (34th) | Advantages of Travelling by Train | Ventajas de viajar en tren | Karmele Soler and Olga Cruz |

=== 2020s ===
| Year | English title | Original title | Recipient(s) |
|---|---|---|---|
| 2020 (35th) | Coven | Akelarre | Beatushka Wotjowicz and Ricardo Molina |
| 2020 (35th) | Adú | | Elena Cuevas, Mara Collazo and Sergio López |
| 2020 (35th) | My Heart Goes Boom! | Explota Explota | Milu Cabrer and Benjamín Pérez |
| 2020 (35th) | Unknown Origins | Orígenes secretos | Paula Cruz, Jesús Guerra and Nacho Díaz |
| 2021 (36th) | Outlaws | Las leyes de la frontera | Sarai Rodríguez, Benjamín Pérez and Nacho Díaz |
| 2021 (36th) | The Good Boss | El buen patrón | Almudena Fonseca and Manolo García |
| 2021 (36th) | Libertad | | Eli Adánez, Sergio Pérez Berbel and Nacho Díaz |
| 2021 (36th) | Maixabel | | Karmele Soler and Sergio Pérez Berbel |
| 2022 (37th) | Prison 77 | Modelo 77 | Yolanda Piña, Félix Terrero |
| 2022 (37th) | The Beasts | As bestas | Irene Pedrosa, Jesús Gil |
| 2022 (37th) | Piggy | Cerdita | Paloma Lozano, Nacho Díaz |
| 2022 (37th) | Piety | La piedad | Sarai Rodríguez, Raquel González, Óscar de Monte |
| 2022 (37th) | God's Crooked Lines | Los renglones torcidos de Dios | Montse Santfeliu, Carolina Atxukarro, Pablo Perona |
| 2023 (38th) | Society of the Snow | La sociedad de la nieve | Ana López-Puigcerver, Belén López-Puigcerver, Montse Ribé |
| 2023 (38th) | 20,000 Species of Bees | 20.000 especies de abejas | Aihoa Eskusabel, Jose Gabarain |
| 2023 (38th) | The Tenderness | La ternura | Eli Adánez, Juan Begara |
| 2023 (38th) | Jokes & Cigarettes | Saben aquell | Caitlin Acheson, Benjamín Pérez, Nacho Díaz |
| 2023 (38th) | Valle de sombras | | Sarai Rodríguez, Noé Montes, Óscar del Monte |
| 2024 (39th) | Marco, the Invented Truth | Marco, la verdad inventada | Karmele Soler, Sergio Pérez Berbel, Nacho Díaz |
| 2024 (39th) | The 47 | El 47 | Karol Tornaría |
| 2024 (39th) | The Room Next Door | La habitación de al lado | Morag Ross, Manolo García |
| 2024 (39th) | Undercover | La infiltrada | Patricia Rodríguez, Tono Garzón |
| 2024 (39th) | The Red Virgin | La virgen roja | Eli Adánez, Paco Rodríguez Frías |
| 2025 (40th) | The Captive | El cautivo | Ana López-Puigcerver, Belén López-Puigcerver, Nacho Díaz |
| 2025 (40th) | Gaua | | Patricia López, Paco Rodríguez H., Nacho Díaz |
| 2025 (40th) | The Truce | La tregua | Sarai Rodríguez, David Moreno, Óscar del Monte |
| 2025 (40th) | Maspalomas | | Karmele Soler, Sergio Pérez Berbel |
| 2025 (40th) | Sirāt | | Zaira Eva Adén |
