= The Dark Night (film) =

1989 film

- Theatrical release poster
- Spanish: La noche oscura
- Directed by: Carlos Saura
- Written by: Carlos Saura
- Produced by: Andrés Vicente Gómez
- Starring: Juan Diego; Julie Delpy; Fernando Guillén
- Cinematography: Teo Escamilla
- Edited by: Pedro del Rey
- Production companies: Iberoamericana Films; La Générale d'Images
- Release dates: February 1989 (Berlinale); 23 February 1989 (Spain)
- Running time: 93 minutes
- Countries: Spain; France
- Language: Spanish

The Dark Night (Spanish: La noche oscura) is a 1989 Spanish-French drama film directed by Carlos Saura. It stars Juan Diego as John of the Cross in solitary confinement in a Carmelite monastery in Toledo in 1577.

Saura both wrote the screenplay and directed the film. Andrés Vicente Gómez is the producer. The film was entered in the 39th Berlin International Film Festival.

== Plot ==
John, wearing a blindfold, travels as a prisoner to a monastery in Toledo, unable to see where he is going.

John enters the monastery. In the hall, a group of priests remove his blindfold. They force him to stand trial, but John refuses to obey the friars, unwilling to ask for forgiveness for his Reformist beliefs. The friars order John to take off his clothes and put on one of their robes, but John refuses. Therefore, they put him in solitary confinement. Later, they take him out of his room and whip him while they sing religious hymns. After his first whipping, John begins to create his religious poems. He recites his verses while praying God for the strength to survive.

In a flashback, the Mother of a convent introduces him to the nuns who live there. One nun stares at him, behavior that surprises John. John later prays to God in his room when the same nun appears. She wears a white dress. She begins to take off her clothes in front of John. John approaches her and touches her while circling her. After a moment, he appears very uncomfortable and walks away from her. When he turns around, she had disappeared. The only thing that remains is the white dress on the floor.

While eating, the friars read the history of the nun, Justina. She was tormented by the Devil and almost renounced the church. They explain to John that the Pope wants to end the Discalced Carmelites, but still, John will not renounce his beliefs.

John is sleeping in his bed when a hand appears next to his head. More hands appear from all sides of the bed. The hands rip his clothes apart and scratch his body while he screams. The image of Justina, the nun, appears but this time, she wears a dark blue dress. The hands disappear when the friar who takes care of John enters the room. John says to him that there are demons who want to take over his body to tempt him. He claims he had fought against the devil before and offers to talk about the first time that the demon tried to occupy him. John narrates the story of a woman in the convent who people came to listen to because she seemed dictated by the Devil. That woman was Justina. In another flashback, she writhes on the mud floor in the room and says the demon possesses her. She throws a cross against the wall. John enters Justine's room and sees someone engaged in sexual activities with her. It appears to be John himself.

In the present, John announces that he is too proud, interrupting a dinner and the head priest's Bible reading. However, when asked to repeat what he said, John asks for forgiveness and says his outburst was a moment of weakness. He reaffirms his faith and says the friars are mistaken about their traditional beliefs.

In June, John hears Justine's voice saying he needs to leave the monetary because he has other, more important work to do in the outside world. John uses his scissors and a ball of yarn to measure the distance from his window to the ground. He rips the fabric of his robe to make a rope. When the warden gives him privacy to use the facilities, John breaks the lock on his door. In the night, he escapes from the monastery with his cord.

== Cast ==
- Juan Diego as San Juan de la Cruz
- Fernando Guillén as carcelero
- Manuel de Blas as Prior
- Francisco Casares as Fray José
- Fermí Reixach as Fray Gerónimo Tostado
- Julie Delpy as Ana de Jesús / Virgen
- Abel Vitón as Fray Jacinto
- Marielena Flores as Superiora
- Adolfo Thous as Fray María

== Historical accuracy ==
The film presents true events in John's life to give context. At the beginning of the film, a priest in the monastery reads historical facts about John's life when he enters the hall for the first time for his trial. He also introduces the connection between John and Teresa of Jesus in this moment. Teresa is represented in a negative manner because the priest says that she has created a conspiracy, therefore presenting the tensions between the different Carmelite groups from the beginning. The priest describes the differences between his group and the Discalced Carmelites accurately as well. John's escape from the window using the rope made of his robe is also in line with the historical facts that we have.

But the film is not supposed to be a narrative; rather, it is an investigation. According to El País, the film explores the central question surrounding John's famous life: “¿Cómo, en efecto, en tan atroz adversidad se las arregló Juan de la Cruz para componer tal exquisitez, una tan delicada música de la palabra?” (translation: “How, indeed, in such atrocity and adversity did John of the Cross resolve to write words so exquisite, delicate, and musical?”). The manner in which the filming techniques present Juan Diego in such intense moments helps us to understand how the poet was able to write something so important to Spanish literature in such terrible conditions. In the interview, Saura says that the film is not about religion; rather, the film focuses specially on John's interior processes and secular mysticism. Therefore, the film is about the skills of this important lyrical poet in Spanish literature.

== Production ==
Carlos Saura wrote and directed the film starring Juan Diego. The film is Spanish-French co-production by Iberoamericana Films and La Générale d'Images. The budget for the film was 250 million pesetas. It was lensed by Teo Escamilla. The majority of the filming was done in Madrid in the Roma studios, but parts were filmed in the Veruela Abbey, in Tarazona and in Toledo. The film's music is by J. S. Bach.

== Release ==
The film was entered in the 39th Berlin International Film Festival in February 1989. It was released theatrically in Spain on 23 February 1989.

== Accolades ==
Year	Award	Category	Nominee(s)	Result	Ref.
1990	4th Goya Awards	Best Actor	Juan Diego	Nominated	
1990	4th Goya Awards	Best Supporting Actor	Fernando Guillén	Nominated	
1990	4th Goya Awards	Best Cinematography	Teo Escamilla	Nominated	
1990	4th Goya Awards	Best Editing	Pedro del Rey	Nominated	
1990	4th Goya Awards	Best Costume Design	Ana Alvargonzález	Nominated	
1990	4th Goya Awards	Best Makeup and Hairstyles	Romana González, José Antonio Sánchez, Mercedes Guillot, Josefa Morales	Nominated	
1990	4th Goya Awards	Best Sound	Gilles Ortion, Carlos Faruolo	Nominated	
1990	4th Goya Awards	Best Special Effects	Reyes Abades	Nominated	

== See also ==
- List of Spanish films of 1989
