= The Things of Love =

- Theatrical release poster
- Spanish: Las cosas del querer
- Directed by: Jaime Chávarri
- Screenplay by: Lázaro Irazábal; Fernando Colomo; Jaime Chávarri
- Story by: Lázaro Larreta
- Produced by: Luis Sanz
- Starring: Ángela Molina; Ángel de Andrés López; Manuel Bandera; María Barranco; Amparo Baró; Mari Carmen Ramírez; Juan Gea; Eva León; Diana Peñalver; Santiago Ramos; Miguel Molina
- Cinematography: Hans Burmann
- Edited by: Pedro del Rey
- Music by: Gregorio García Segura
- Production companies: Lince Films; Compañía Iberoamericana de TV
- Release date: 3 October 1989
- Country: Spain
- Language: Spanish

The Things of Love (Spanish: Las cosas del querer) is a 1989 Spanish musical film directed by Jaime Chávarri which stars Ángela Molina, Ángel de Andrés López, and Manuel Bandera.

== Plot ==
Set in Francoist Spain, the plot tracks a homosexual singer (Mario), a pianist (Juan), and the latter's girlfriend (Pepita), who form a troupe (as well as a love triangle) and tour around Spain.

== Cast ==
- Ángela Molina as Pepita
- Ángel de Andrés López as Juan
- Manuel Bandera as Mario
- María Barranco as Nena Colman
- Amparo Baró as Balbina
- Mari Carmen Ramírez
- Juan Gea
- Eva León
- Diana Peñalver
- Santiago Ramos
- Miguel Molina

== Production ==
A Lince Films and Compañía Iberoamericana de TV production, the film was inspired by the life of copla singer Miguel de Molina, even though the filmmakers had no permission from the artist and the producer Luis Sanz did not want to acknowledge it either. The screenplay was penned by Lázaro Irazábal, Fernando Colomo, and Jaime Chávarri, based on a story by Lázaro Larreta. Shooting locations included the 'Teatro Ideal Cinema' in Úbeda, as well as Madrid and the province of Almería.

== Release ==
The film was theatrically released in Spain on 3 October 1989.

== Accolades ==
Year	Award	Category	Nominee(s)	Result	Ref.
1990	4th Goya Awards	Best Original Screenplay	Antonio Larreta, Fernando Colomo, Jaime Chávarri, Lázaro Irazábal	Nominated	
1990	4th Goya Awards	Best Actress	Ángela Molina	Nominated	
1990	4th Goya Awards	Best Supporting Actress	María Barranco	Nominated	
1990	4th Goya Awards	Best Original Score	Gregorio García Segura	Nominated	
1990	4th Goya Awards	Best Art Direction	Luis Sanz	Nominated	
1990	4th Goya Awards	Best Costume Design	José María García Montes, María Luisa Zabala	Nominated	
1990	4th Goya Awards	Best Makeup and Hairstyles	Gregorio Ros, Jesús Moncusi	Nominated	

== See also ==
- List of Spanish films of 1989
- List of LGBT-related films of 1989
