= Opera prima =

Ópera prima
- Theatrical release poster
- Spanish: Ópera prima
- Directed by: Fernando Trueba
- Screenplay by: Óscar Ladoire; Fernando Trueba
- Produced by: Miguel Ángel Bermejo; Fernando Colomo; Manolo Matji
- Cinematography: Ángel Luis Fernández
- Music by: Fernando Ember
- Release date: 1980
- Running time: 94 minutes
- Country: Spain
- Language: Spanish

Ópera prima is a 1980 Spanish comic film directed by Fernando Trueba and starring Óscar Ladoire. It was written by Ladoire and Trueba. It is one of the most acclaimed Spanish Cinema films of the eighties. It is considered an iconic example of the comedia madrileña.

== Synopsis ==
Matías, a young man recently separated from his wife, falls in love with his cousin Violeta, a girl passionate about violin and hippie style.

== Cast ==
- Óscar Ladoire ... Matías
- Paula Molina ... Violeta
- Antonio Resines ... León
- Luis González Regueral ... Nicky
- Kiti Mánver ... Ana
- Alejandro Serna ... Nicolás
- Marisa Paredes ... Zoila Gómez
- David Thomson ... Warren Belch
- Tony Valento ... Hombre del supermercado
- El Gran Wyoming ... Macarra

== Reception ==
Writing for Guía del Ocio, Carlos Boyero wrote about a film "comedy, piece of life, purity in motion" jumping "into the ring without shells that scare away danger".

== Awards ==
- Venice Film Festival
  - Young Talent Award (Fernando Trueba)
  - Best actor (Óscar Ladoire)
- Premios Fotogramas de Plata
  - Anexo:Fotogramas de Plata al mejor intérprete de cine español (Óscar Ladoire)
