= The Butterfly Effect (1995 film) =

- Theatrical release poster
- Spanish: El efecto mariposa
- Directed by: Fernando Colomo
- Screenplay by: Fernando Colomo; Joaquín Oristrell
- Produced by: Beatriz de la Gándara
- Starring: María Barranco; Coque Malla; Rosa Maria Sardà; James Fleet; Peter Sullivan; Cécile Pallas
- Cinematography: Jean-François Robin
- Edited by: Miguel Ángel Santamaría
- Music by: Ketama
- Distributed by: United International Pictures (Spain); Steward (France)
- Release dates: 20 December 1995 (Spain, U.S.); 13 May 1998 (France)
- Running time: 110 minutes
- Countries: Spain; France
- Languages: Spanish; English
- Box office: $880,000 (Spain)

The Butterfly Effect (Spanish: El efecto mariposa; French: L'effet papillon) is 1995 Spanish-French romantic comedy film directed by Fernando Colomo which stars María Barranco, Coque Malla, and Rosa Maria Sardà, with James Fleet, Peter Sullivan, and Cécile Pallas in supporting roles. It features dialogue in Spanish and English. Ketama was responsible for the score.

== Cast ==
- María Barranco as Olivia
- Coque Malla as Luis
- Rosa Maria Sardà as Noelia
- James Fleet as Oswald
- Peter Sullivan as Duncan
- John Faal as Nick
- Cécile Pallas as Chantal
- Raj Patel as Pakistani
- Sakuntala Ramanee as Kamala
- José María Pou as Rafa
- Pablo Colomo as Older Nick
- Gracia Olayo as Azafata
- María José Lebrero as Maid
- Roger Ennals as Policeman
- Karl Glenn Stimpson as Policeman

== See also ==
- List of Spanish films of 1995
