= Teresa de Jesús =

- Written by: Víctor García de la Concha; Carmen Martín Gaite; Josefina Molina
- Directed by: Josefina Molina
- Starring: Concha Velasco; Marina Saura; María Massip; Gonzalo Abril; Francisco Rabal; Héctor Alterio; Patricia Adriani
- Music by: Alejandro Massó; José Nieto
- Country of origin: Spain
- Original language: Spanish
- No. of episodes: 8

Production
- Producer: Ramón Salgado
- Running time: 450 mins
- Production company: Televisión Española
- Budget: 400 million Pts

Original release
- Network: TVE-1
- Release: 12 March – 30 April 1984

Teresa de Jesús is a Spanish television mini-series produced by Televisión Española and broadcast in its Primera Cadena in 1984. Directed by Josefina Molina and written by Víctor García de la Concha, Carmen Martín Gaite and Molina herself, it stars Concha Velasco as Teresa of Avila.

The 450-minute, eight-episode miniseries was also released as a 222-minute feature film. It also exists in a four-episode shortened version.

== Premise ==
It presents the life of Teresa of Avila, a Spanish saint, mystic, and doctor of the Roman Catholic Church, who was at one time proclaimed "patron saint of the Spanish race" by the Spanish government, and has been proposed on multiple occasions since her death to be an official patron saint of Spain. Its dialogue is in Spanish, but versions with English subtitles are available. The film stars Concha Velasco as Teresa. Also appearing are Gonzalo Abril as Lorenzo de Cepeda (Teresa's younger brother, 2/8 episodes), María Massip as Juana Suárez (Teresa's friend, 2/8 episodes), Francisco Rabal as Peter of Alcantara (1 episode), Héctor Alterio (1 episode), and Marina Saura as another nun (8 episodes). It tells the story of Teresa's life from age 23 (in the year 1538) until her death at age 67 (in 1582).

== Synopsis ==
Teresa de Jesús was originally broadcast from 12 March to 30 April 1984, in the following 8 episodes:

- Episode 1 (12 Mar): Vida. Teresa is age 23, ill, and travelling to see a local healer. Along the way she is introduced to Francisco de Osuna's book, The Third Spiritual Alphabet, which kindles her spiritual interest. She does not respond to treatment, but meets and helps a troubled local priest.
- Episode 2 (19 Mar): Camino de perfección. Teresa's illness continues for 3 years and she experiences a coma for 3 days, but benefits from a miraculous cure she attributes to St. Joseph. She experiences spiritual aridity, but is inspired by reading St. Augustine's Confessions. She experiences mystical visions that provoke distrust and opposition from fellow nuns and priests.
- Episode 3 (26 Mar): Cuentas de conciencia. Further mystical visions, and continued opposition. She meets her spiritual guide Peter of Alcantara, and first contemplates the idea of a reform movement within her order, the Carmelites.
- Episode 4 (2 Apr): Desafío espiritual. Founding of the first reformed convent, in Ávila, despite strong opposition from the neighborhood residents. First experiences in living by the new rule.
- Episode 5 (9 Apr): Fundaciones. Founding of several more reformed convents. Teresa meets a young man who joins her order in its first monastery. He was later to become St. John of the Cross.
- Episode 6 (16 Apr): Visita de descalzas. Teresa is appointed against her wishes as prioress of her original (unreformed) convent, and she continues visiting and managing challenges of the newly founded reformed houses. She meets her confessor Father Jerónimo Gracián, and is denounced to the Inquisition by Princess Eboli, a noblewoman whose unreasonable demands Teresa had resisted.
- Episode 7 (23 Apr): Las moradas. Conflicts come to a head between reformed (Discalced) and unreformed (Calced) orders. St. John of the Cross is imprisoned and tortured by monks of the unreformed order. Eventually, The Pope approves autonomous status for the reformed orders, shielding them from interference from the unreformed.
- Episode 8 (30 Apr): Hija de la Iglesia. Teresa's final illness, last wishes, and death. An epilogue about the reported incorruptibility of her remains, and her wider posthumous recognition, including her canonization.

In 2008, the film was released in the US as a 3-disc DVD set with English subtitles. It included a 16-page booklet with episode summaries, Teresa's biography (4-pages) and timeline (1 page), a set of 9 discussion questions, an interview with historian Thomas Dubay, and a bibliography for further reading.

== Awards ==
Teresa de Jesús won several awards:

- Antena de Oro (1984)
- Fotogramas de Plata (1985), Best TV Performer (Mejor intérprete de televisión): Concha Velasco
- TP de Oro (1985), Best Actress (Mejor Actriz): Concha Velasco
- TP de Oro (1985), Best National Series (Mejor Serie Nacional)
