= Comedia madrileña =

The so-called comedia madrileña or nueva comedia madrileña ('Madrid comedy' or 'New Madrid comedy') was a film trend or film label for urban comedies in Spain that emerged during the Transition. It was led by filmmakers such as Fernando Colomo and Fernando Trueba.

Emphasizing the urban setting of Madrid and urban concerns, it consists of light, carefree comedies. Characters display an unmistakable progressive worldview, with the stories tending to bring to light the inner contradictions of the generation who had grown in opposition to the Francoist regime, even if the explicitly political elements generally feature as a backdrop. The sketch of the typical protagonist of the early comedia madrileña is that of a forty-year-old urban male with an [implicit] university education, trapped in an existential crisis. Despite some commonalities, mainstream comedia madrileña titles usually bear a tangential relation to the so-called Movida madrileña, insofar the latter was conventionally regarded as more "underground". However Pedro Almodóvar took over Colomo's template and moved it to a "much more transgressive" environment, indeed diving into the Movida madrileña in Pepi, Luci, Bom (1980).

Seminal works of the comedia madrileña are considered to be either Fernando Colomo's Tigres de papel (1977) or What's a Girl Like You Doing in a Place Like This? (1978), also by Colomo. Another iconic title belonging to the film trend is Fernando Trueba's Opera prima (1980). Other examples include Trueba's Sal gorda, Miguel Ángel Díez's De fresa, limón y menta and José Luis Cuerda's Pares y nones. A key figure in 1980s comedia madrileña films is actress Carmen Maura.

The formula exhausted with the generational leap and the aging of the young "progres" of the Transition.

The template was somewhat updated to a new social context in the 1990s with films such as Emilio Martínez Lázaro's The Worst Years of Our Lives (1994) and Álvaro Fernández Armero's Todo es mentira (1994).
