= Stormy Weather (2003 Spanish film) =

- Theatrical release poster
- Spanish: Tiempo de tormenta
- Directed by: Pedro Olea
- Screenplay by: Joaquín Górriz; Miguel Ángel Fernández
- Story by: Alicia Giménez Bartlett
- Produced by: Andrés Vicente Gómez; Enrique Cerezo
- Starring: Maribel Verdú; Jorge Sanz; Darío Grandinetti; María Barranco; Remedios Cervantes; Ramón Goyanes; Mónica Randall
- Cinematography: Néstor Calvo
- Edited by: José Salcedo
- Music by: Ángel Illarramendi
- Release date: 25 April 2003
- Running time: 87 minutes
- Country: Spain
- Language: Spanish

Stormy Weather (Spanish: Tiempo de tormenta) is a 2003 Spanish melodrama film directed by Pedro Olea from a screenplay by Joaquín Górriz and Miguel Ángel Fernández which stars Maribel Verdú, Jorge Sanz, Darío Grandinetti, and María Barranco.

== Plot ==
Set in Madrid, the plot tracks two couples coming across in a detoxification centre, formed, respectively by a weather presenter and a drug-addicted graphic artist (Elena and Chus), and an alcoholic former model and a record label executive (Sara and Óscar).

== Cast ==
- Maribel Verdú as Elena
- Jorge Sanz as Chus
- María Barranco as Sara
- Darío Grandinetti as Óscar
- Mónica Randall
- Ramón Goyanes
- Remedios Cervantes
- Daniel Ruipérez
- Natalia Pallás

== Production ==
The screenplay was authored by Miguel Ángel Fernández and Joaquín Górriz based on an original story by Alicia Giménez Bartlett. The film is an Enrique Cerezo PC, Lolafilms, and Iberoamericana Films production. Shooting locations included Madrid.

== Release ==
The film opened the main competition slate of the 6th Málaga Film Festival on 25 April 2003, being simultaneously released in theatres. It grossed about €346,000 (76,700 admissions).

== Reception ==
Mirito Torreiro of Fotogramas rated the film 3 out of 5 star, praising the elegance of its mise-en-scène.

== Accolades ==
Year	Award	Category	Nominee(s)	Result	Ref.
2003	6th Málaga Film Festival	Special Jury Prize		Won	
2003	6th Málaga Film Festival	Best Screenplay	Joaquín Górriz, Miguel Ángel Fernández	Won	

== See also ==
- List of Spanish films of 2003
