= Going South Shopping =

1989 film

- Theatrical release poster
- Spanish: Bajarse al moro
- Directed by: Fernando Colomo
- Screenplay by: J. Luis Alonso de Santos; Joaquín Oristrell; Fernando Colomo
- Based on: Bajarse al moro by José Luis Alonso de Santos
- Produced by: Carlos Durán; José Luis García Sánchez
- Starring: Verónica Forqué; Antonio Banderas; Aitana Sánchez-Gijón; Chus Lampreave; Miguel Rellán; Juan Echanove
- Cinematography: Javier Salmones
- Edited by: Miguel Ángel Santamaría
- Music by: Pata Negra
- Production companies: Ion Films; Lolafilms
- Distributed by: Warner Española
- Release date: 5 May 1989
- Running time: 83 minutes
- Country: Spain
- Language: Spanish

Going South Shopping (Spanish: Bajarse al moro, lit. 'Going Down to the Moor') is a 1989 Spanish comedy film directed by Fernando Colomo based on the play Bajarse al moro by José Luis Alonso de Santos. It stars Verónica Forqué alongside Antonio Banderas, Juan Echanove, and Aitana Sánchez-Gijón.

== Plot ==
The plot tracks the mishaps of Chusa (a drug trafficker 'going south' to Morocco to buy hashish) and other characters based in the neighborhood of Lavapiés in Madrid, including her cousin Jaimito, police agent Alberto, virgin Elena, and a family of nudists who run a clothing store.

== Cast ==
- Verónica Forqué as Chusa
- Antonio Banderas as Albertico
- Aitana Sánchez-Gijón as Elena
- Chus Lampreave as Mme. Antonia
- Miguel Rellán as cura ('priest')
- Juan Echanove as Jaimito

== Production ==
Based on José Luis Alonso de Santos's play Bajarse al moro, the screenplay was penned by Alonso de Santos alongside Fernando Colomo and Joaquín Oristrell. The film is an Ion Producciones and Lolafilms production. The score was composed by the sibling duo Pata Negra consisting of Rafael Amador and Raimundo Amador. Shooting locations included Madrid, Chaouen, and Algeciras. The dialogues incorporate elements of the cheli jargon characteristic of Madrid's outcast youth.

== Release ==
The film opened in theatres on 5 May 1989.

== Accolades ==
Year	Award	Category	Nominee(s)	Result	Ref.
1990	4th Goya Awards	Best Adapted Screenplay	Fernando Colomo	Nominated	
1990	4th Goya Awards	Best Actress	Verónica Forqué	Nominated	
1990	4th Goya Awards	Best Supporting Actress	Chus Lampreave	Nominated	
1990	4th Goya Awards	Best Original Score	Pata Negra	Nominated	
1990	4th Goya Awards	Best Production Supervision	Andrés Santana	Nominated	
1990	4th Goya Awards	Best Sound	Miguel Ángel Polo, Enrique Molinero	Nominated	

== See also ==
- List of Spanish films of 1989
