= The Dream of the Mad Monkey =

The Dream of the Mad Monkey (Le rêve du singe fou) is a novel by Christopher Frank, published in 1976. It was adapted to film in 1990 as Twisted Obsession.

== Plot summary ==
An American screenwriter, Dan Gillis, living in Paris, has been abandoned by his wife. He has a hard time getting used to a new life as a single parent with his son, Danny. He is commissioned by successful producer, Legrand, to write a script. Dan has worked with that same producer in the past. This time though, he is required to write an unconventional story together with Malcolm - a young and unknown film director. Dan hesitates about taking the job, since it as far from the kind of work he usually does. Legrand insists and the intriguing personality of the young director eventually convinces him to accept, even though his agent, the beautiful, disabled Marilyn, advises against it. As soon as he starts working on the script Dan discovers that there is something else behind this job. He becomes painfully aware of and shamelessly intrigued by the incestuous relationship between Malcolm and his beautiful younger sister Jenny. Sexual fantasy and hallucinatory dream sequences lead Malcolm to become obsessed with Jenny as he starts his own investigating of the circumstances behind the making of this particular movie. He ultimately discovers that he has been had and is caught in a haywire of greed and ambition from which he cannot escape.

== Edition information ==
- Frank, Christopher. Le Reve du Singe Fou. Seuil (Paris), 1976
