= Réquiem por Granada =

Television series

- Spanish: Réquiem por Granada
- Italian: Granata, addio
- German: Die Löwen der Alhambra
- Genre: Historical drama
- Screenplay by: Vicente Escrivá; Manuel Matji
- Directed by: Vicente Escrivá
- Starring: Horst Buchholz; Delia Boccardo; Manuel Bandera; Gioia Scola; Javier Escrivá; Marita Marschall; Pedro Díez del Corral; Oleg Fedorov; Juanjo Puigcorbé
- Composer: Antón García Abril
- Countries of origin: Spain; Italy; Germany
- Original language: Spanish
- No. of seasons: 1
- No. of episodes: 8

Production
- Production companies: Aspa Films; Midega Films; TVE; RAI 1 Taurus Film

Original release
- Network: tve1
- Release: 9 October – 27 November 1991

Réquiem por Granada (transl. 'Requiem for Granada') is a period drama television miniseries directed by Vicente Escrivá recreating the fall of the Kingdom of Granada in the 15th century. An international co-production, it aired on TVE1 in 1991.

== Premise ==
The fiction retells from the Muslim perspective the fall of the Nasrid Kingdom of Granada.

== Cast ==
- Horst Buchholz as Muley Hassan
- Delia Boccardo as Fátima
- Manuel Bandera as Boabdil
- Gioia Scola as Isabel de Solís
- Javier Escrivá as Ismail
- Marita Marschall as Isabella the Catholic
- Pedro Díez del Corral as Ferdinand the Catholic
- Oleg Fedorov as Al Zagal
- Juanjo Puigcorbé as Christopher Columbus
- Esperanza Campuzano as Moraima
- Germán Cobos
- Julio Gavilanes
- Javier Loyola
- Iñaki Aierra
- Juan Jesús Valverde

== Production and release ==
Featuring a budget of 1,500 million pesetas, Réquiem por Granada was a co-production of Aspa Films, Midega Films, TVE, RAI 1 and Taurus Film. The series was directed by Vicente Escrivá, whereas the score was composed by Antón García Abril. The screenplay was written by Escrivá together with Manuel Matji. Filming, which began on 12 February 1990 in Sierra Nevada, was beset by problems. Shooting locations included the Alhambra, the Great Mosque of Córdoba, and the Alcázar of Seville, as well as Fez, in Morocco. The miniseries consisted of 8 episodes featuring a running time of 52 minutes. The broadcasting run on TVE1 began on 9 October 1991. The finale was programmed for 27 November 1991.

Series	Episodes	Originally released		
Series	Episodes	First released	Last released	Network
1	8	9 October 1991	27 November 1991	tve
