= What's a Girl Like You Doing in a Place Like This? =

- Theatrical release poster
- Spanish: ¿Qué hace una chica como tú en un sitio como este?
- Directed by: Fernando Colomo
- Screenplay by: Fernando Colomo; Jaime Chávarri
- Starring: Carmen Maura; Félix Rotaeta; Héctor Alterio
- Cinematography: Javier Aguirresarobe
- Edited by: Miguel Ángel Santamaría
- Music by: Luis de Pablo
- Production company: La Salamandra PC
- Release date: 25 September 1978
- Country: Spain
- Language: Spanish

What's a Girl Like You Doing in a Place Like This? (Spanish: ¿Qué hace una chica como tú en un sitio como este?) is a 1978 comedy film directed by Fernando Colomo from a screenplay by Colomo and Jaime Chávarri which stars Carmen Maura. It helped to consolidate the comedia madrileña, or urban comedy, film trend that emerged during the Transition in Spain.

== Plot ==
The plot follows the vicissitudes of hairdresser Rosa, separated from fascist former cop Jorge, and her escapist forays with a trendy rock musician.

== Cast ==
- Carmen Maura as Rosa
- Félix Rotaeta as Jorge
- Antonio Canal as Tony
- Marta Fernández Muro as Marta
- Héctor Alterio as Héctor
- Santiago Chamorro as Jorgito

== Production ==
The film shares its original title with the main theme song, commissioned to music band Burning. It is a La Salamandra PC production. Shooting took place in Madrid during five weeks.

== Release ==
The film was theatrically released in Spain on 25 September 1978. It grossed 38,470,025 ₧ (335,139 admissions).

== See also ==
- List of Spanish films of 1978
