= 7000 días juntos =

- Directed by: Fernando Fernán Gómez
- Written by: Fernando Fernán Gómez; Javier García; Maurino Fernando Morales
- Distributed by: United International Pictures
- Release date: 1994
- Country: Spain
- Language: Spanish

7000 días juntos, also known as Siete mil días juntos, (English title: Long Life Together) is a 1994 film directed by Fernando Fernán Gómez. It was written by Gómez, Javier García and Maurino Fernando Morales, and stars Pilar Bardem, José Sacristán, Chus Lampreave, María Barranco, Agustín González and Tina Sainz.
