= Gil Parrondo =

Spanish art director

The Most Excellent Gil Parrondo OAXS
- Born: Gil Parrondo Rico; 17 June 1921; Luarca, Asturias, Spain
- Died: 24 December 2016 (aged 95); Madrid, Spain
- Occupations: Art director; set decorator; production designer
- Years active: 1952–2008

Gil Parrondo Rico OAXS (17 June 1921 – 24 December 2016) was a Spanish art director, set decorator and production designer. He won two Academy Awards and was nominated for another in the category of Best Art Direction.

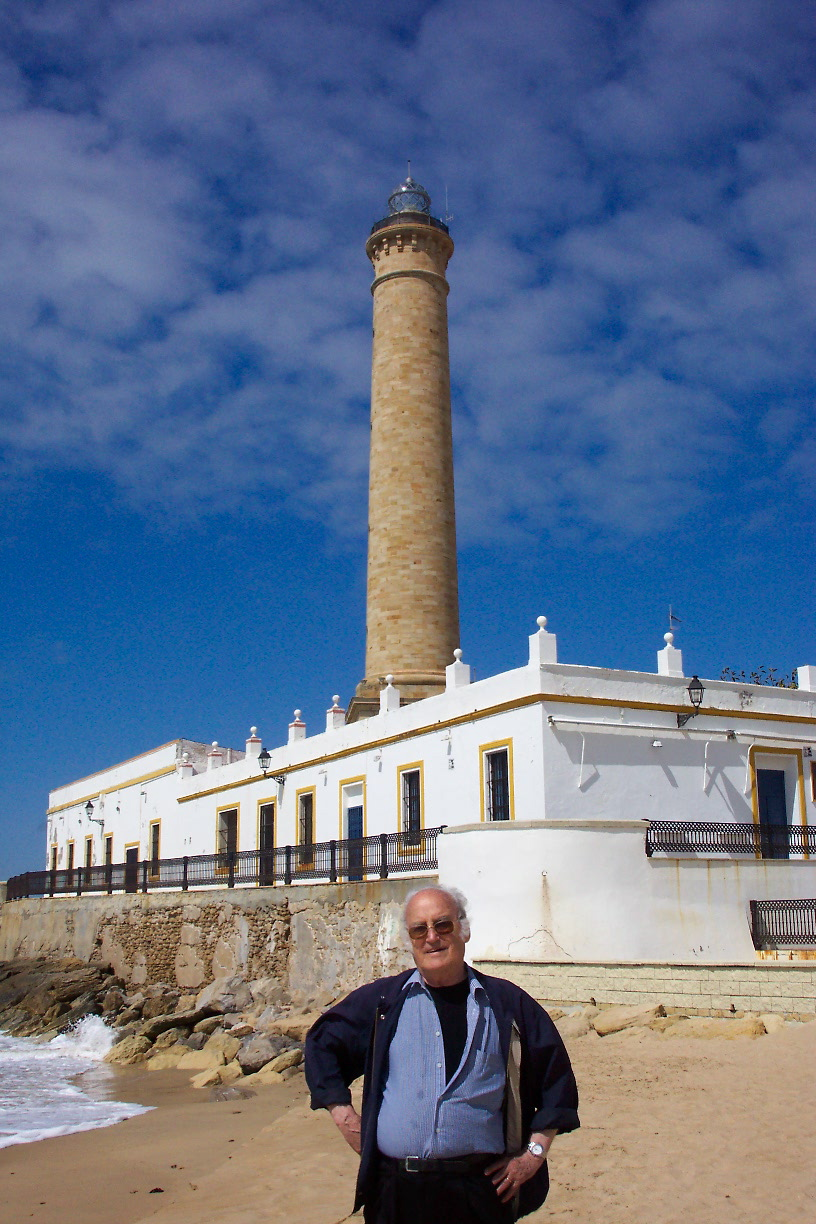
Art Director Gil Parrondo during a location scout in Southern Spain, in 2004

== Selected filmography ==
- Gloria Mairena (1952)
- High Fashion (1954)
- Love on Wheels (1954)
- An Andalusian Gentleman (1954)
- The Girl from the Red Cabaret (1973)
- The Grandfather (1998)

Parrondo won two Academy Awards for Best Art Direction and was nominated for another:

Won

- Patton (1970)
- Nicholas and Alexandra (1971)

Nominated

- Travels with My Aunt (1972)

== Honours ==
- Gold Medal of Merit in Fine Arts (Kingdom of Spain, 22 June 1983).
- Knight Grand Cross of the Civil Order of Alfonso X, the Wise (Posthumous, Kingdom of Spain, 27 January 2017).

== See also ==
- List of Spanish Academy Award winners and nominees
