= María Barranco =

Spanish actress (born 1961)

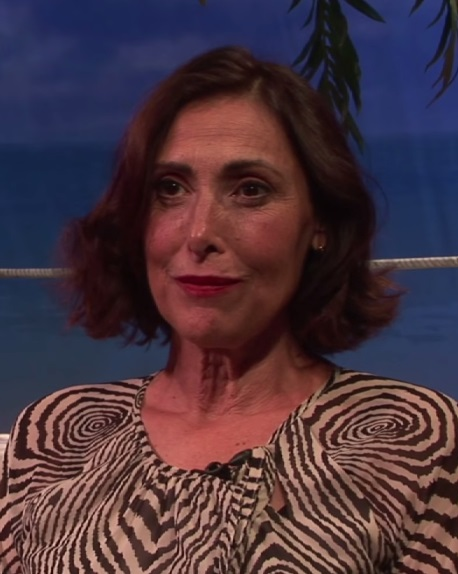
- María Barranco (2014)
- Born: María de los Remedios Barranco García; 11 June 1961 (age 65); Málaga, Spain
- Occupation: Actress
- Spouse: Imanol Uribe (m. 1982; div. 2004)

María de los Remedios Barranco García (born 11 June 1961) better known as María Barranco is a Spanish actress, who has won two Goya Awards for Best Supporting Actress.

== Biography ==
María de los Remedios Barranco García was born on 11 June 1961 in Málaga. She studied medicine, but quit to study drama in her city, where she participated in various theatre groups. Later, she moved to Madrid, to debut on stage in a production of La venganza de Don Mendo (Don Mendo's revenge). Barranco made her film debut in 1986's El elegido (The Chosen). Barranco won a Goya Award for playing a transsexual prostitute in the 1990 film The Ages of Lulu.

She was married to filmmaker Imanol Uribe from 1982 to 2004. They have a daughter, Andrea.

== Filmography ==
Year	Title	Role	Notes	Ref.
1988	Mujeres al borde de un ataque de nervios (Women on the Verge of a Nervous Breakdown)	Candela		
1989	Zugzwang (Fool's Mate)			
1989	El baile del pato			
1989	Las cosas del querer (The Things of Love)	Nena Colman		
1989	Una sombra en el jardín	Ana		
1989	¡Átame! (Tie Me Up! Tie Me Down!)	Berta		
1990	Don Juan, mi querido fantasma (Don Juan, My Dear Ghost)	Doña Inés		
1990	Las edades de Lulú (The Ages of Lulu)	Ely		
1991	Todo por la pasta (Anything for Bread)	Azucena		
1991	El rey pasmado (The Dumbfounded King)	Lucrecia		
1992	Aquí, el que no corre... vuela	Lola		
1992	El juego de los mensajes invisibles	María Luisa		
1993	La ardilla roja (The Red Squirrel)	Carmen		
1993	Rosa Rosae	Rosae		
1994	Todos los hombres sois iguales (All Men Are the Same)	Susana		
1994	Siete mil días juntos	Angelines		
1995	Sálvate si puedes	Marta		
1995	El seductor	Merche		
1995	Cuernos de mujer	Ana		
1995	Morirás en Chafarinas (You Shall Die in Chafarinas)	Elisa		
1995	El palomo cojo (The Lame Pigeon)	Mary		
1995	Boca a boca (Mouth to Mouth)	Angela		
1995	El efecto mariposa (The Butterfly Effect)	Olivia		
1996	Bwana	Dori		
1997	99.9: la frecuencia del terror (99.9)	Lara		
1998	La niña de tus ojos (The Girl of Your Dreams)	Embajadora		
1999	Novios (Couples)	Paz		
2001	Anita no pierde el tren (Anita Takes a Chance)	Natalia		
2002	El viaje de Carol (Carol's Journey)	Aurora		
2003	El oro de Moscú (Moscow Gold)	Alejandra		
2003	Tiempo de tormenta (Stormy Weather)	Sara		
2004	Atún y chocolate (Tuna and Chocolate)	María		
2005	Lifting de corazón	Cristina		
2006	El carnaval de Sodoma	Mónica		
2011	La daga de Rasputín	Alejandra		
2019	La noche de las dos lunas	Eva		
2021	El refugio (Our (Perfect) Xmas Retreat)	Lola		
2023	Matusalén			

== Television ==
- Sopa boba
- Ellas son así

== Accolades ==
Year	Award	Category	Work	Result	Ref.
1989	3rd Goya Awards	Best Supporting Actress	Women on the Verge of a Nervous Breakdown	Won	
1990	4th Goya Awards	Best Supporting Actress	The Things of Love	Nominated	
1991	5th Goya Awards	Best Supporting Actress	The Ages of Lulu	Won	
1992	6th Goya Awards	Best Supporting Actress	The Dumbfounded King	Nominated	
1994	8th Goya Awards	Best Supporting Actress	The Red Squirrel	Nominated	
