= Jeanne Smith =

Expert on sickle cell anemia

Jeanne A. Smith
- Born: 1931; Manhattan
- Died: November 11, 2006 (aged 74–75); Lewisboro, NY
- Occupation: hematologist
- Spouse: Russell F. Smith Jr.
- Children: 2

Jeanne A. Smith (1931 – November 11, 2006) was an American haematologist and an expert on sickle cell anemia. She was also a former administrator at Harlem Hospital Center and helped put in place federal guidelines for testing newborns for sickle cell anemia.

== Biography ==
Smith was born in Manhattan. She graduated from Sarah Lawrence College and earned her medical degree from New York University in 1957. Later, she also received a master's degree in public health from Columbia University.

Smith joined Harlem Hospital in 1968 and served as the president of its medical board between 1984 and 1987. She also served as director of its sickle cell center and taught at Columbia. Smith led several National Institute of Health-funded studies throughout the 1970s, 80s, and 90s on sickle cell anemia and related diseases. In the 1970s, she ran a NIH study that followed the growth and development of primarily black patients with sickle cell anemia from infancy through adulthood. The study became an important metric for gauging the severity of the disease over time. In 1993, Smith was co-chairman of a panel that called for more intensive screening for infants of Middle Eastern, Mediterranean, and South American descent. This panel also recommended vaccinations and antibiotic treatments for infants with the disease, and these guidelines were accepted by the American Academy of Pediatrics, and were widely adopted. Smith also served as the president of Englewood, NJ's Board of Education in the 1970s and president of its Board of Health in the 1980s.

== Publications ==
Sickle Cell Disease: Screening, Diagnosis, Management, and Counseling in Newborn and Infants (1997) (ISBN 978-0788147036)

== Personal life ==
Smith was married to Russell F Smith; they had two sons.

Smith died on November 11, 2006 after complications from a stroke.
