= Wolfgang Burmann =

Spanish art director

Wolfgang Burmann Sánchez
- Born: 1940
- Occupation: Film Director
- Father: Sigfrido Burmann

Wolfgang Burmann Sánchez (born 1940) is an art director of Spanish-German origin, who has directed various films, television series and plays. He is the winner of the 1988 Goya Award for Best Art Direction for the film Remando al viento (Rowing with the Wind). He is the son of designer and artistic director Sigfrido Burmann and brother of cinematographer Hans Burmann.

== Awards and nominations ==
Goya Awards
Category	Year	Film	Result	Ref
Best art direction	2007	Oviedo Express	Nominated	
Best art direction	1998	Abre los ojos	Nominated	
Best art direction	1995	La flor de mi secreto	Nominated	
Best art direction	1991	Don Juan en los infiernos	Nominated	
Best art direction	1988	Remando al viento	Won	
Best art direction	1986	Romanza final (Gayarre)	Nominated	
