= Josefina Molina =

Spanish film director (1936–2026)

The Most Excellent Josefina Molina
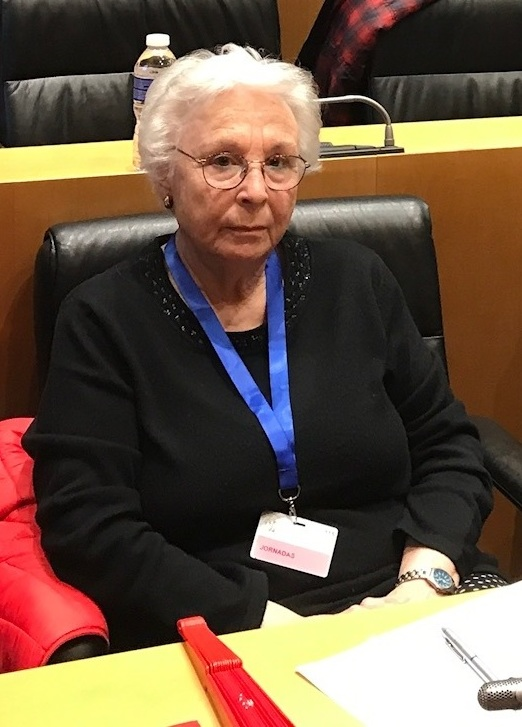
- Molina in 2018
- Born: Josefina Molina Reig; 14 November 1936; Córdoba, Spain
- Died: 30 May 2026 (aged 89); Madrid, Spain
- Occupations: Film director, screenwriter

Josefina Molina Reig (14 November 1936 – 30 May 2026) was a Spanish feature film director, screenwriter, television producer and scene director. She was one of the first female directors in Spain and is also known for directing such notable feature films as Función de noche (1981) and Esquilache (1988), as well as the television series Teresa de Jesús (1984). Esquilache was entered into the 39th Berlin International Film Festival. Teresa de Jesús won several awards, including the Antena de Oro (1984), and the TP de Oro (1985, Best National Series).

== Background ==
Josefina Molina was born in Córdoba, Spain on 14 November 1936, into a middle-class family. Her father was a Cordovan shopkeeper who traded in shoes and drugstore products. Her mother was a Catalan woman in charge of the housework and child care. The family business was very successful and despite the postwar economic difficulties she did not suffer any kind of deprivation.

Thanks to her parents' stable financial situation, the young Josefina was able to attend prestigious schools in Córdoba such as Hermanos de la Salle, where she was taught how to write and basic mathematics or Escolapias de Santa Victoria, where she finished high school.

She finished high school in 1969 and had the opportunity to pursue a Baccalaureate because her family belonged to the merchant class. Thus, Molina decided to make the most of the academic education (mainly because of her mother's determination) that her parents were able to offer her.

Her first contact with the world of cinema took place in the exhibition hall of her hometown, where her parents used to take her on Sunday afternoon. In addition, she also had a great love of reading and hence, at the early age of thirteen, she discovered such important literary work as Episodios Nacionales (National Episodes) by Galdós (1843–1920). This collection of novels decisively influenced Molina's vocation as a narrator, as well as her pronounced tendency towards realism. However, it was not until she was fifteen years old when Molina saw the movie El río (The River) by Jean Renoir (1951), that her keen interest in telling stories through films awoke.

In her youth, she enthusiastically joined several groups of Cordovan intellectuals, all encouraged by artistic curiosity. She regularly attended screenings and discussions organized by the Cineclub Senda (Senda Film Club) and Cineclub del Círculo de la Amistad (Circle of Friendship Film Club). She also attended the Círculo Juan XXIII (Juan XXIII Circle), the gathering place for the most progressive Cordovan youth in Francoist Spain. There she established the basis of the theatre group Teatro Ensayo Medea. Driven by a feminist spirit, it was leading this group that she worked for the first time as a theatre director, bringing on stage Casa de Muñecas (A Doll's House), by the Norwegian playwright Henrik Ibsen (1828–1906). The first night of this play, which took place at the Salón Liceo del Círculo de la Amistad (Friendship Circle Lyceum Hall), was a resounding failure. The message expressed by Ibsen was much too forward-looking and direct to be easily understood.

Far from being discouraged by this first setback, Molina decided to go ahead with her career as a theatre director. She managed to release four performances and, at the same time, she reached out to different important local showbusiness and media figures. That was how, from 1962, she began to collaborate regularly with the Vida de espectáculos (Life of shows) radio program. It was broadcast with great success on Radio Vida in a section entitled La mujer y el cine (Women and Cinema).

Molina died in Madrid on 30 May 2026, at the age of 89.

== Professional career ==
Molina studied political science and in 1962 she founded the theatre group Teatro de Ensayo Medea in her hometown and led several productions. In 1969 she became the first woman to obtain the degree in directing / producing in the Official Cinema School. In those days, she shot many dramas for the Spanish Television (Estudio 1 [Study 1], Hora once [Eleventh hour], Teatro de siempre [The same theater as always] etc.).

She was put in charge of an adaptation of The Metamorphosis by Kafka, of which she said: "it was a drudgery that no one wanted to do, but I put my heart into it and the people ended up saying: 'the poor girl has worked so hard that we have to something with it.' You cannot imagine how unbearable this kind of paternalism is."

Molina adapted and directed several productions such as Motín de Brujas (Riot of Witches) by Josep Maria Benet, No puede ser el guardar una mujer (There is no Guarding a Woman) by Agustín Moreto, Cartas de Amor (Love letters) by A. R. Gurney and La Lozana Andaluza (The healthy Andalusian girl), an adaptation by Rafael Alberti of the play by Francisco Delicado.

Her most renowned television series are: El Camino (The Road) (1978) which tells the story of Daniel, an 11-year-old boy called el Mochuelo (small owl), who has been enrolled at school in the city and therefore has to leave the village where he has grown up. However, the night before his departure, Daniel remembers his childhood and the tales of the inhabitants of the valley where he was brought up; Teresa de Jesús (Teresa of Jesus) (1984) relates the life of St. Teresa of Jesus, played by Concha Velasco, and Entre Naranjos (Among orange trees) an adaptation of the homonymous novel written by Blasco Ibañez (1998).

She also directed theatre, achieving great success with Cinco Horas con Mario (Five hours with Mario), a monologue which has been represented for decades. It has been performed at different times by Lola Herrera and Natalia Millan based on the homonymous novel from Miguel Delibes. In 1990 she directed Los últimos Días de Emmanuel Kant (The Last Days of Immanuel Kant), by Alfonso Sastre.

Her first feature film, Vera, un cuento cruel (Vera, a cruel tale), which belongs to the fantasy genre, dates from 1973. In 1981 she reached a good standard as a filmmaker with Función de noche (Evening performance). This film tells the life of a separate marriage in which Lola Herrera and Daniel Dicenta interpret their own lives.

In 1989 the historical drama Esquilache was released. It is based on Un soñador para un pueblo (A dreamer for the people) by Antonio Buero Vallejo. It had a great cast which included Fernando Fernán Gómez, Adolfo Marsillach, Concha Velasco and other renowned actors. Lo más natural (The most natural) (1990), starring Charo López and Miguel Bosé, and La Lola se va a los puertos (Lola goes to the ports) (1993), with the singer Rocío Jurado, were her last film works.

In 2006 she founded CIMA, a female association of filmmakers and media, along with other filmmakers like Inés París, Chus Gutiérrez, Icíar Bollaín and Isabel Coixet. Josefina was Honorary President of the association. In 2011 the Spanish Academy of Film Arts and Sciences granted her the Honorary Goya Award, whose gala she was unable to attend. In 2012 she was named Honorary Citizen in Andalucia.

Besides being a director she was also a gifted writer. When she decided not to do any more movies, Josefina Molina began to write because, as she said, 'if I did not, I would be very bored.' Her first novel was Cuestión de azar (A Matter of Chance). She described it as: "the story of my generation in Andalucia, how girls are educated and how I was brought up". That novel was followed by En el umbral de la hoguera (On the threshold of the stake) about Teresa of Jesus. "They asked me for a book based on the television series, but as I left one episode out of the final version, I preferred to write about it: her trip to Andalucia – while the Inquisition was investigating her and the Order told her to be quiet. At the same time, the Barefoot Carmelitas and the rest of the Order were at war.– "... I am only an apprentice in writing, but it is exciting because you can do whatever you want, without having a producer who tells you what to do nor a team that depends on your instructions. You only have to make agreements with yourself when you write, you can cheat on yourself but in the end you are the only one responsible. This is what fascinated me." After writing a requested book, Los papeles de Bécquer (Becquer's papers) and an autobiography, Sentada en un rincón (Sitting in a Corner), she has now been writing for six years, "which I am never going to finish."

Molina also wrote the foreword of Ana Mariscal, una Cineasta Pionera (Ana Mariscal, a pioneer filmmaker), written by Victoria Fonseca.

In addition to her work in cinema and theater, she developed a wide career as television director and filmmaker, mainly for Spanish Television.

== Filmography ==
=== Director ===
- Entre naranjos (Among orange trees) (TV mini-series) (3 episodes) (1998)
- Función de noche (Evening Performance) (TV series) (1 episode) (1995)
- Las trampas del azar. Dos tiempos de una crónica (Random traps. Two times of one chronic) (1995)
- La lola se va a los puertos (Lola goes to the ports) (1993) – Lo más natural (The Most Natural Thing) (1991)
- Esquilache (1989) – La voz humana (The Human Voice) (TV series) (1 episode) (1986) – La mujer sola (Lonely woman) (1986)
- Paisaje con figuras (Landscape with Figures) (TV series) (1 episode) (1984)
- Lope de Vega(1984)
- Teresa de Jesús (Teresa of Jesus) (TV series) (8 episodes) (1984)
- Hija de la iglesia (Daughter of the Church) (1984) – Vida (Life) (1984)
- Visita de descalzas (Visit of Barefoots) (1984)
- Fundaciones (Foundations)
- El castillo interior (The Interior Castle) (1984) (TV series) (8 chapters)
- Función de noche (Evening Performance) (1981)
- Cuentos eróticos (Erotic Tales) (part of "The Tilita") (1980)
- Escrito en América (Written in America) (TV series) (1979)
- Novela (Novel) (TV series) (6 episodes) (1974–1978)
- Los libros (The Books) (TV series) (1 episode) (1976)
- Doña Luz (Mrs Luz) (1976)
- Estudio 1 (Study 1) (TV series) (2 episodes) (1975–1976) * Anna Christie (1976) * Hedda Gabler (1975)
- Escritores de hoy (Contemporary writers) (TV series) (1 episode) (1975) La asegurada (The insured woman)
- Cuentos y leyendas (Tales and Legends) (TV series) (1 episode) (1974) La promesa (The Promise)
- Un globo, dos globos, tres globos (A balloon, two balloons, three balloons) (TV series) (1 episode) (21 October 1974)
- Vera, un cuento cruel (Vera, a cruel tale) (1974) – Los pintores del Prado (The Prado painters) (TV series) (1 episode) Durero: la búsqueda de la identidad (Dürer: The Pursuit of Identity) (1974)
- La rama seca (The dry branch) (short film) (1972)
- Hora once (Eleventh hour) (TV series) (4 episodes) (1971-1972) El cochero (The coachman), La prudente venganza (The Careful Revenge), Eleonora and La Marquesa de O (The Marquise of O)
- Teatro de siempre(The same theater as always) (TV series) (1 episode) (1971)
- Casa de muñecas II (Dollhouse II) (1971)
- Melodrama infernal (Dreadfull melodrama) (short film) (1969)
- Pequeño estudio (Small study) (TV series) (1968)
- Aquel humo gris (That gray smoke) (short film) (1967)
- La otra soledad (The other loneliness) (short film) (1966)

=== Screenwriter ===
- Entre naranjos (Among orange trees) (TV mini-series) (3 episodes) (1998)
- La Lola se va a los puertos (Lola goes to the ports) (1993)
- Esquilache (1989)
- La voz humana (The human voice) (TV series) (adaptation – 1 episode)
- La mujer sola (Lonely Woman) (1986) (adaptation)
- Teresa de Jesús (Teresa of Jesus) (TV series) (8 episodes) (1984)
- Hija de la iglesia (Daughter of the Church) (1984) – "Vida" (Life) (1984)
- Visita de descalzas (Visit of Barefoots) (1984)
- Fundaciones (Foundations)
- El castillo interior (The Interior Castle) (1984)
- Función de noche (Evening Performance) (1981)
- Novela (Novel) (TV series) (adaptation – 5 episodes) (1978)
- Los libros (The Books) (TV series) (adaptation – 1 episode) (1976)
- Doña Luz (Mrs Luz) (1976) (adaptation)
- Estudio 1 (Study 1) (TV series) (adaptation – 2 episodes) (1975–1976) ''"Anna Christie"'' (1976) and ''"Hedda Gabler"'' (1975)
- Vera, un cuento cruel (Vera, a cruel tale) (1974)
- Los pintores del Prado (The Prado Painters) (TV series) (1 episode) (1974) "Durero: la búsqueda de la identidad" (Dürer: The Pursuit of Identity)
- Melodrama infernal (Dreadfull Melodrama) (short film) (1969)
- Aquel humo gris (That gray smoke) (short film) (1967)
- La otra soledad (The other loneliness) (short film) (1966)

=== Second director ===
- Teatro de siempre (The same theater as always) (TV series) (assistant director – 1 episode) "Ricardo III" (1967)
- Luciano (short film) (assistant director) (1965)

=== Actress ===
- Cuentos eróticos (Erotic Tales) (1980) as 'a woman who winks'

== Awards and nominations ==
Year	Award	Category	Work	Result
1989	Goya Award	Best Director	Esquilache	Nominated
1989	Goya Award	Best Adapted Screenplay	Esquilache	Nominated
1998	Spanish Television Academy Awards	Best Directoring and / or production	Entre naranjos (Among orange trees)	Won
1998	Spanish Television Academy Awards	Best fiction programme	Entre naranjos (Among orange trees)	Nominated
2003	Spanish Television Academy Awards	Honorary "Toda una vida" (A whole lifetime)	-	Won
2011	Goya Award	Honorary	-	Won

== Honours ==
- Gold Medal of Merit in Labour (14 November 2011).
- Josefina Molina Award:

An award bearing her name was established by the 58th Sitges Film Festival, in collaboration with the SGAE Foundation. The prize includes a cash award of €10,000 and was presented in 2025 for the Best Fantastic Feature Film Screenplay by a Woman. Open to female writers who are members of the SGAE, regardless of nationality, the award recognizes original screenplays for feature-length films in the fantastic genre.
