= Pierre-Louis Thévenet =

French production designer

- Occupations: Production designer Art director Set decorator
- Years active: 1959–2001

Pierre-Louis Thévenet was a French production designer, art director and set decorator.

== Awards ==
He won an Academy Award in the category Best Art Direction for the film Patton (1970). He won a Goya Award for Best Art Direction for the film Goya in Bordeaux (1999).

== Selected filmography ==
- Patton (1970)
