= Manuel Bandera =

Spanish actor

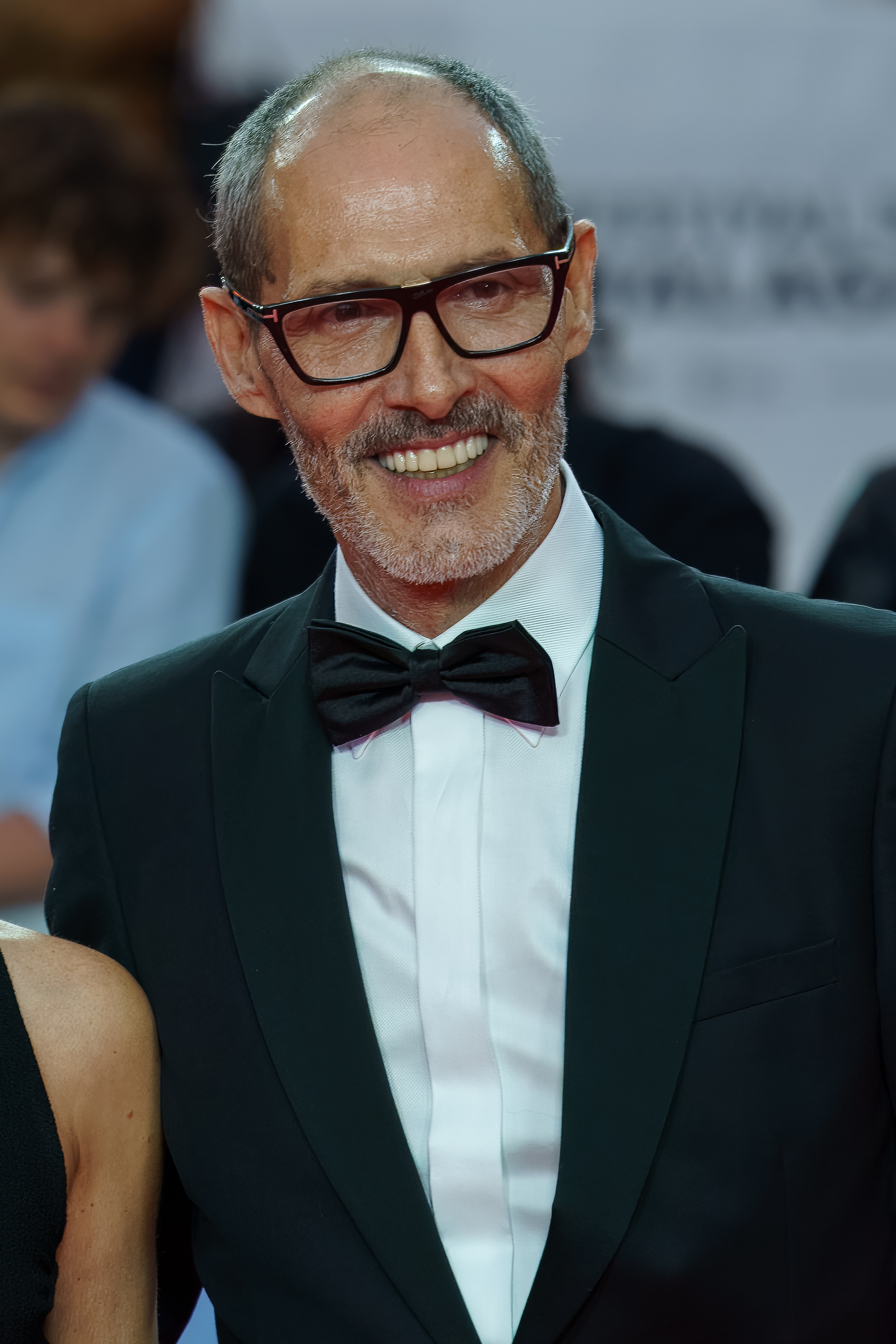
- Bandera in 2025
- Born: 12 December 1960 (age 65); Málaga, Spain
- Occupations: Actor, dancer

Manuel Bandera (born 12 December 1960) is a Spanish actor and dancer. He became popular for his performance in the 1989 film The Things of Love.

== Biography ==
Born on 12 December in 1960 in Málaga, Bandera started his career performing as dancer in the game show Un, dos, tres... responda otra vez.

He landed a breakthrough role with his performance in Jaime Chávarri's film The Things of Love (1989), which garnered him public recognition. He played Mario, a homosexual artist victim of the Francoist repression, inspired by the real-life Miguel de Molina. He performed minor roles in the Pedro Almodóvar's films Átame and Kika. Bandera starred in the lead role of Boabdil in the television miniseries Réquiem por Granada.

He has performed several main cast roles in soap operas, including El súper, Amar en tiempos revueltos, Bandolera and Acacias 38. At present (2021-2022), he is playing a main character in "A Chorus Line" promoted by Antonio Banderas.

== Filmography ==
Television

Year	Title	Role	Notes	Ref
1990	Réquiem por Granada	Boabdil	Lead role	
1999	El súper		Main. Introduced in season 3	
2008–2009	Amar en tiempos revueltos	Ramón Rivas	Main. Introduced in season 4	
2011–2013	Bandolera	Juan Caballero	Main	
2018	El Continental	Comisario		
2019	Los nuestros 2	General Gamón		
2019–2021	Acacias 38	José, "el Choco"	Main	

Film

Year	Title	Role	Notes	Ref
1989	Las cosas del querer (The Things of Love)	Mario	Starring. Character inspired in Miguel de Molina	
1993	Tirano Banderas (Banderas, the Tyrant)	Currito mi alma		
1994	Las cosas del querer II	Mario	Sequel to Las cosas del querer	
1997	Pajarico (Little Bird)	Uncle Juan		
2000	Papá es un ídolo	Mauricio		
2001	El lado oscuro del corazón 2 (The Dark Side of the Heart 2)	El Muerte		
2010	Don Mendo Rock ¿La venganza?	Paco	Starring	
2016	Parada en el infierno (Stop Over in Hell)	Tim Rogers		
