= Love, Hate and Death =

1989 film

- Directed by: Vicente Escrivá
- Written by: Vicente Escrivá
- Starring: Cristina Hoyos
- Release date: 2 October 1989
- Running time: 96 minutes
- Country: Spain
- Language: Spanish

Love, Hate and Death (Spanish: Montoyas y Tarantos) is a 1989 Spanish drama film directed by Vicente Escrivá. The film was selected as the Spanish entry for the Best Foreign Language Film at the 62nd Academy Awards, but did not nominated.

== Cast ==
- Cristina Hoyos as María la Taranto
- Sancho Gracia as Antonio Montoya
- Juan Paredes as Manuel Taranto
- Esperanza Campuzano as Ana Montoya
- Juan Antonio Jiménez as Mercucho
- José Sancho as Teo el Picao
- Mercedes Sampietro as Soledad
- Queta Claver as Ama

== See also ==
- List of submissions to the 62nd Academy Awards for Best Foreign Language Film
- List of Spanish submissions for the Academy Award for Best Foreign Language Film
