= Fernando Colomo =

Spanish film producer, screenwriter and film director

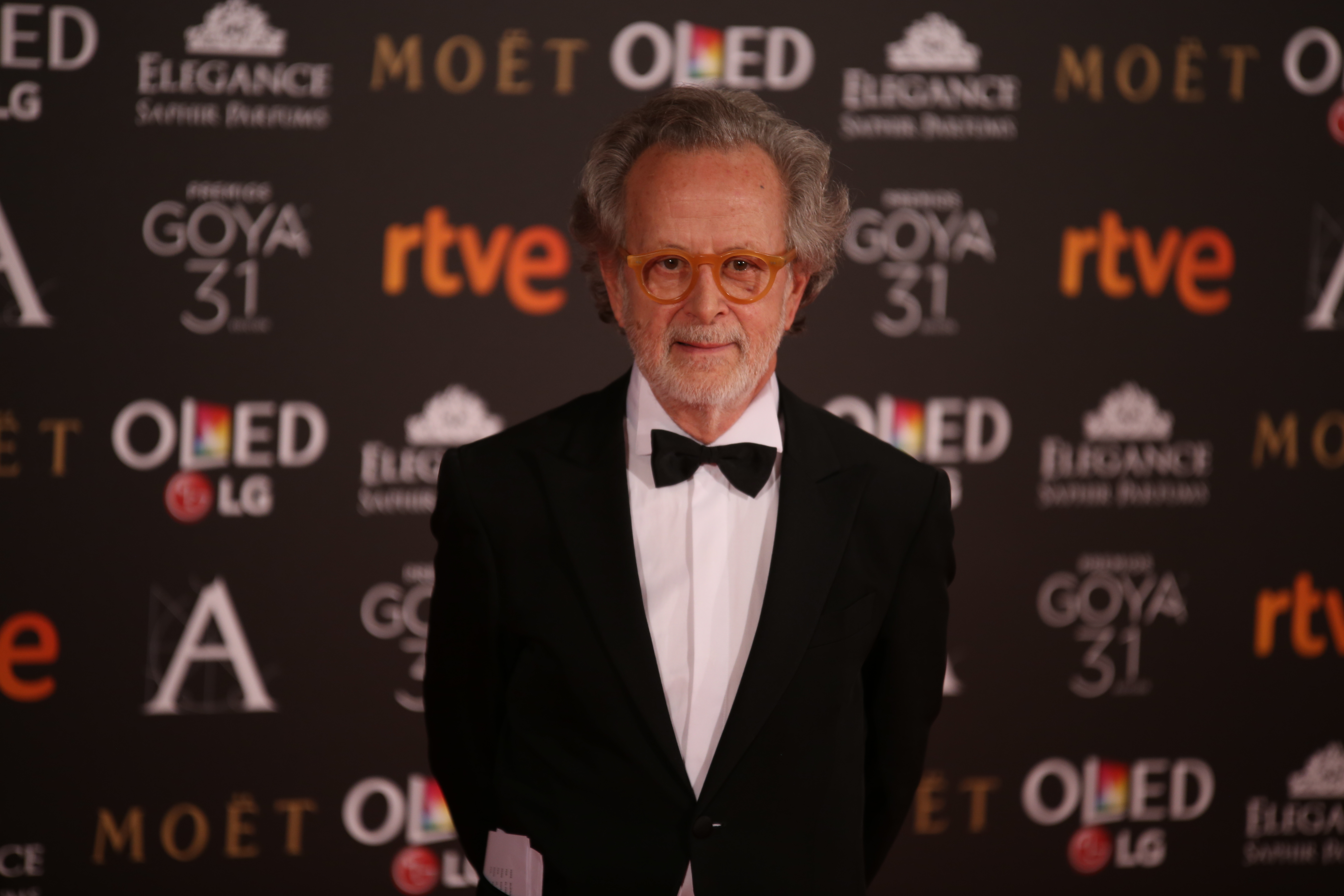
- Colomo in 2017
- Born: Fernando Colomo Gómez; 2 February 1946 (age 80); Madrid, Spain
- Occupations: Film producer, director and screenwriter

Fernando Colomo Gómez (born 2 February 1946) is a Spanish film producer, screenwriter and film director. He has also acted in small roles in his own and other's films. He is regarded as the father of the so-called comedia madrileña.

== Filmography ==
=== Feature film ===
Year	Title	Director	Writer	Producer	Notes
1977	Tigres de papel	Yes	Yes	No	
1978	De fresa, limón y menta	No	Yes	No	
1978	What's a Girl Like You Doing in a Place Like This?	Yes	Yes	No	
1990	La mano negra	Yes	Yes	Yes	
1982	Estoy en crisis	Yes	Yes	Yes	
1983	La línea del cielo	Yes	Yes	No	
1985	The Knight of the Dragon	Yes	Yes	Yes	Also additional spaceship designer
1987	La vida alegre	Yes	Yes	Yes	Also camera operator
1988	Miss Caribe	Yes	Yes	No	
1989	Going South Shopping	Yes	No	No	
1989	The Things of Love	No	Yes	No	
1993	Rosa Rosae	Yes	Yes	No	
1994	Alegre ma non troppo	Yes	Yes	Yes	
1995	El efecto mariposa	Yes	Yes	No	
1996	Eso	Yes	No	No	
1996	El Cuarteto de la Habana	Yes	Yes	No	
1998	The Stolen Years	Yes	Yes	No	
2003	South from Granada	Yes	Yes	No	
2006	El próximo Oriente	Yes	Yes	No	
2008	Rivales	Yes	No	No	
2012	Picasso's Gang	Yes	Yes	No	
2015	Isla bonita	Yes	Yes	Yes	
2016	La noche que mi madre mató a mi padre	No	Yes	No	
2018	The Tribe	Yes	Yes	No	
2019	The Burning	Yes	No	No	
2021	Polyamory for Dummies	Yes	Yes	No	
2021	Cuidado con lo que deseas	Yes	Story	No	

Producer only
Year	Title	Notes
1980	Opera prima	Also art director
1989	El Baile del Pato	
1992	Orquesta Club Virginia	
1994	Mi hermano del alma	
1995	Salto al vacío	Associate producer
1995	Entre Rojas	
1995	Hola, ¿Estás sola?	
1996	Not Love, Just Frenzy	
1998	Atomica	Also dialogue supervisor
2002	My Mother Likes Women	

=== Short film ===
Year	Title	Director	Writer	Producer	Notes
1974	Lola, paz y yo	No	Story	Yes	
1975	En un parís marginado	Yes	Yes	Yes	
1976	Usted va a ser mamá	Yes	Yes	No	
1976	Pomporrutas imperiales	Yes	Yes	No	
1980	Para unas prisas...	No	No	Yes	
1980	Koñensonaten	Yes	Yes	No	Segment of Cuentos eróticos
2004	Mis 30 euros	Yes	No	No	Segment of ¡Hay motivo!
2019	Romeo y Julio	Yes	No	No	Advertising short
2023	Por las nubes	Yes	No	No	Medium-length film

=== Acting roles ===
Year	Title	Role	Notes
1978	Sentados al borde de la mañana con los pies congelados	Sr. Ayuntamiento	
1980	Cuentos Eroticos	Man looking for service	
1982	En Septiembre	Old alumnus	Uncredited
1983	La línea del cielo	Party guest	Uncredited
1985	The Knight of the Dragon	Guardian	Uncredited
1986	Werther		
1987	La vida alegre		
1987	El Pecador Impecable	Friar	
1992	Salsa rosa	Neighbor	
1993	¿Por qué lo llaman amor cuando quieren decir sexo?	Aurelio Castro	
1994	Todos los hombres sois iguales	Fernando	
1994	Todo es mentira	Alejandro	
1995	Boca a boca	Plastic surgeon	
1996	Eso		Uncredited
1996	Not Love, Just Frenzy	Fernando	
1996	Love Can Seriously Damage Your Health	Maitre	
1997	¿De que se ríen las mujeres?	Sound technician	
1998	Atómica	Gynecologist at the party	
1999	Sobreviviré	Juez de Paz	Uncredited
2002	My Mother Likes Women	Juez de Paz	
2004	Things That Make Living Worthwhile	Chiquipark manager	
2004	Entre vivir y soñar	French academy friend	
2008	Rivales		Uncredited
2015	Isla Bonita	Fer	
2017	Operación Concha	Director	
2018	The Tribe	Employee	Uncredited
2021	El Club del Paro	Player in Bus 1	
2022	Pijamas Espáciales		

=== Television ===
Year	Title	Director	Writer	Executive Producer	Notes
1991-1992	Las Chicas de hoy en día	Yes	Yes	No	Directed 21 episodes, wrote 26 episodes
1993-1994	Truhanes	No	Yes	No	2 episode
1994-1995	¡Ay, señor, señor!	Yes	No	No	4 episodes
1995	El Consultorio de la Doctora Delgado	Yes	Yes	Yes	
1999	Famosos y familia	Yes	Yes	No	
2001	Cegada de amor	Yes	Yes	No	TV movie
2001	Dime que me quieres	Yes	No	No	1 episode
2004	Los 80	Yes	Yes	Co-executive	Directed 3 episodes, wrote 1 episode
2010	El Pacto	Yes	No	No	Miniseries
2018	Burning. Noches de rock and roll	Yes	Yes	No	Documentary
2020	Relatos con-fin-a-dos	Yes	No	No	Episode "Emparedados"

== Political activity ==
In the 2019 Spanish general election, he candidated to the Spanish Senate for Madrid within Recortes Cero - Grupo Verde - Partido Castellano - Tierra Comunera. His aim was to promote the list rather than becoming elected.
