= Esquilache =

1989 film by Josefina Molina

- Spanish film poster
- Directed by: Josefina Molina
- Written by: Joaquín Oristrell; Josefina Molina
- Starring: Fernando Fernán Gómez; Concha Velasco; Adolfo Marsillach; José Luis López Vázquez; Amparo Rivelles; Alberto Closas; Ángela Molina
- Cinematography: Juan Amorós
- Music by: José Nieto
- Release date: 26 January 1989
- Country: Spain
- Language: Spanish

Esquilache is a 1989 Spanish film directed by Josefina Molina. The film stars Fernando Fernán Gómez as Leopoldo de Gregorio, Marquis of Esquilache. It is based on the play "Un Soñador Para Un Pueblo" by Antonio Buero Vallejo. The film was entered into the 39th Berlin International Film Festival.

== Plot ==
The film dramatizes the Esquilache Riots, a popular uprising in Madrid in 1766 against the reforms of Leopoldo de Gregorio, Marquis of Esquilache, the minister of King Charles III. The unrest begins as opposition to restrictions on traditional clothing and develops into a wider protest against the government's policies, leading to violence and political turmoil.

== Cast ==
- Fernando Fernán Gómez as Esquilache
- José Luis López Vázquez as Antonio Campos
- Ángela Molina as Fernanda
- Ángel de Andrés as Marqués de la Ensenada
- Concha Velasco as Pastora Patermo
- Adolfo Marsillach as Carlos III
- Amparo Rivelles as Isabel de Farnesio
- Alberto Closas as Duque de Villasanta
- Tito Valverde as Bernardo
