= Moon Child (1989 film) =

1989 film

- Theatrical release poster
- Directed by: Agustí Villaronga
- Written by: Agustí Villaronga
- Starring: Maribel Martín
- Cinematography: Jaume Peracaula
- Edited by: Raúl Román
- Release date: May 1989
- Running time: 118 minutes
- Country: Spain
- Language: Spanish

Moon Child (Spanish: El niño de la luna) is a 1989 Spanish fantasy film directed by Agustí Villaronga. It was entered into the 1989 Cannes Film Festival.

== Cast ==
- Maribel Martín - Victoria
- Lisa Gerrard - Georgina
- Enrique Saldaña - David
- Lucia Bosé - Directora
- David Sust - Edgar
- Mary Carrillo - Anciana carbonera
- Günter Meisner - Abuelo militar
- Heidi Ben Amar - Mid-e-mid
- Lydia Azzopardi - Abuela mora
- Jack Birkett - Inválido
- Lluís Homar - Hombre 1 cabaña
- Albert Dueso - Hombre 2 cabaña
- Joaquim Cardona - Director Orfanato
- Lydia Zimmermann - Cuidadora Centro
