= List of Spanish films of 1995 =

A list of Spanish-produced and co-produced feature films released in Spain in 1995.

== Films ==
| Release | | Title (Domestic title) | Cast & Crew | Ref. |
|---|---|---|---|---|
| J A N U A R Y | 27 | Long Life Together (Siete mil días juntos) | Director: Fernando Fernán Gómez Cast: José Sacristán, María Barranco, Pilar Bardem, Chus Lampreave, Agustín González, Tina Sainz | |
| F E B R U A R Y | 3 | El perquè de tot plegat | Director: Ventura Pons Cast: Lluís Homar, Mercè Pons, Rossy de Palma, Pere Ponce, Anna Lizaran, Àlex Casanovas, Ramón Madaula, Sílvia Munt | |
| F E B R U A R Y | 3 | Justino, a Senior Citizen Killer (Justino, un asesino de la tercera edad) | Director: Santiago Aguilar, Luis Guridi (La Cuadrilla) Cast: Saturnino García, Carlos Lucas, Marta Fernández-Muro, Juanjo Puigcorbé, Alicia Hermida | |
| F E B R U A R Y | 23 | Gran slalom | Director: Jaime Chávarri Cast: Laura del Sol, Juanjo Puigcorbé | |
| F E B R U A R Y | 24 | King of the River (El rey del río) | Director: Manuel Gutiérrez Aragón Cast: Ana Álvarez, Alfredo Landa, Gustavo Salmerón, Carmen Maura, Achero Mañas | |
| M A R C H | 3 | Jump into the Void (Salto al vacío) | Director: Daniel Calparsoro Cast: Najwa Nimri, Roberto Shalu, Alfredo Villa, Ion Gabella, Karra Elejalde, Kándido Uranga, Saturnino García | |
| M A R C H | 17 | El seductor | Director: José Luis García Sánchez Cast: María Barranco, Antonio Hortelano, Santiago Ramos, Kiti Manver, Enrique San Francisco | |
| M A R C H | 31 | Cuernos de mujer | Director: Enrique Urbizu Cast: María Barranco, Ramon Madaula, Santiago Ramos, Paloma Lago, Víctor Valverde | |
| A P R I L | 7 | Land and Freedom (Tierra y libertad) | Director: Ken Loach Cast: Icíar Bollaín, Rosana Pastor, Ian Hart | |
| A P R I L | 21 | You Shall Die in Chafarinas (Morirás en Chafarinas) | Director: Pedro Olea Cast: Jorge Sanz, María Barranco, Óscar Ladoire, Javier Albalá, Toni Zenet | |
| A P R I L | 21 | Entre rojas | Director: Azucena Rodríguez Cast: Penélope Cruz, Cristina Marcos, Ana Torrent, María Pujalte | |
| A P R I L | 28 | Stories from the Kronen (Historias del Kronen) | Director: Montxo Armendáriz Cast: Juan Diego Botto, Jordi Mollá, Mercedes Sampietro, Josep Maria Pou, Aitor Merino, Cayetana Guillén Cuervo, Diana Gálvez, Armando del Río, Núria Prims, Pilar Castro | |
| J U N E | 16 | Flamenco | Director: Carlos Saura | |
| J U N E | 16 | Suspiros de España (y Portugal) | Director: José Luis García Sánchez Cast: Juan Echanove, Juan Luis Galiardo | |
| J U N E | 16 | La niña de tus sueños | Director: Jesús Delgado Cast: Ramón Madaula, Ana Gracia, Lio | |
| A U G U S T | 23 | The Law of the Frontier (La ley de la frontera) | Director: Adolfo Aristarain Cast: Pere Ponce, Aitana Sánchez-Gijón, Achero Mañas, Federico Luppi, Fernando Valverde, Agustín González, Enrique San Francisco | |
| A U G U S T | 25 | Tell Laura I Love Her (Dile a Laura que la quiero) | Director: José Miguel Juárez Cast: Jorge Perugorría, Ana Álvarez, Toni Cantó, Nancho Novo, Mabel Lozano | |
| S E P T E M B E R | 1 | Guantanamera | Director: Tomás Gutiérrez Alea, Juan Carlos Tabío Cast: Jorge Perugorría, Mirtha Ibarra, Carlos Cruz | |
| S E P T E M B E R | 8 | Antarctica (Antártida) | Director: Manuel Huerga Cast: Ariadna Gil, Carlos Fuentes | |
| S E P T E M B E R | 8 | A House on the Outskirts (Una casa en las afueras) | Director: Pedro Costa Cast: Juan Echanove, Emma Suárez, Tania Henche, Susi Sánchez, Asunción Balaguer, Lydia Bosch | |
| S E P T E M B E R | 22 | The Flower of My Secret (La flor de mi secreto) | Director: Pedro Almodóvar Cast: Marisa Paredes, Chus Lampreave, Juan Echanove, Carmen Elías, Kiti Manver, Manuela Vargas, Gloria Muñoz, Rossy de Palma, Imanol Arias, Joaquín Cortés | |
| O C T O B E R | 6 | Nobody Will Speak of Us When We're Dead (Nadie hablará de nosotras cuando hayamos muerto) | Director: Agustín Díaz Yanes Cast: Victoria Abril, Federico Luppi, Pilar Bardem, Ana Ofelia Murguía, Daniel Giménez Cacho, Ángel Alcázar, Saturnino García, Marta Aura, Bruno Bichir, Guillermo Gil, Demián Bichir, María Asquerino, Fernando Delgado | |
| O C T O B E R | 6 | The Lame Pigeon (El palomo cojo) | Director: Jaime de Armiñán Cast: María Barranco, Francisco Rabal, Carmen Maura, Miguel Ángel Muñoz | |
| O C T O B E R | 13 | Mouth to Mouth (Boca a boca) | Director: Manuel Gómez Pereira Cast: Javier Bardem, Aitana Sánchez-Gijón, María Barranco, Josep Maria Flotats | |
| O C T O B E R | 20 | The Day of the Beast (El día de la bestia) | Director: Álex de la Iglesia Cast: Santiago Segura, Álex Angulo, Armando De Razza, Santiago Segura | |
| D E C E M B E R | 1 | Two Much | Director: Fernando Trueba Cast: Antonio Banderas, Danny Aiello, Daryl Hannah, Eli Wallach, Joan Cusack, Melanie Griffith, Gabino Diego, Santiago Segura | |

== Box office ==
The ten highest-grossing Spanish films in 1995, by domestic box office gross revenue, are as follows:

Highest-grossing films of 1995
| Rank | Title | Distributor | Admissions | Domestic gross (₧) |
|---|---|---|---|---|
| 1 | Two Much | Sogepaq | 1,344,980 | 764,149,045 |
| 2 | The Flower of My Secret (La flor de mi secreto) | Warner Bros. | 921,095 | 505,924,521 |
| 3 | The Turkish Passion (La pasión turca) | Columbia TriStar | 840,738 | 414,174,681 |
| 4 | Guantanamera | Alta Films | 734,336 | 407,575,677 |
| 5 | Stories from the Kronen (Historias del Kronen) | Alta Films | 751,165 | 381,462,633 |
| 6 | The Day of the Beast (El día de la bestia) | Sogepaq | 673,568 | 370,802,394 |
| 7 | Mouth to Mouth (Boca a boca) | Columbia TriStar | 590,929 | 309,255,947 |
| 8 | Land and Freedom (Tierra y libertad) | Alta Films | 428,048 | 231,762,349 |
| 9 | Men Always Lie (Los hombres siempre mienten) | Columbia TriStar | 447,868 | 224,160,771 |
| 10 | Running Out of Time (Días contados) ‡ | United International Pictures | 467,229 | 212,962,858 |
‡: 1994 theatrical opening

== See also ==
- 10th Goya Awards
