= Goya Award for Best New Director =

Annual award by the Spanish Film Academy

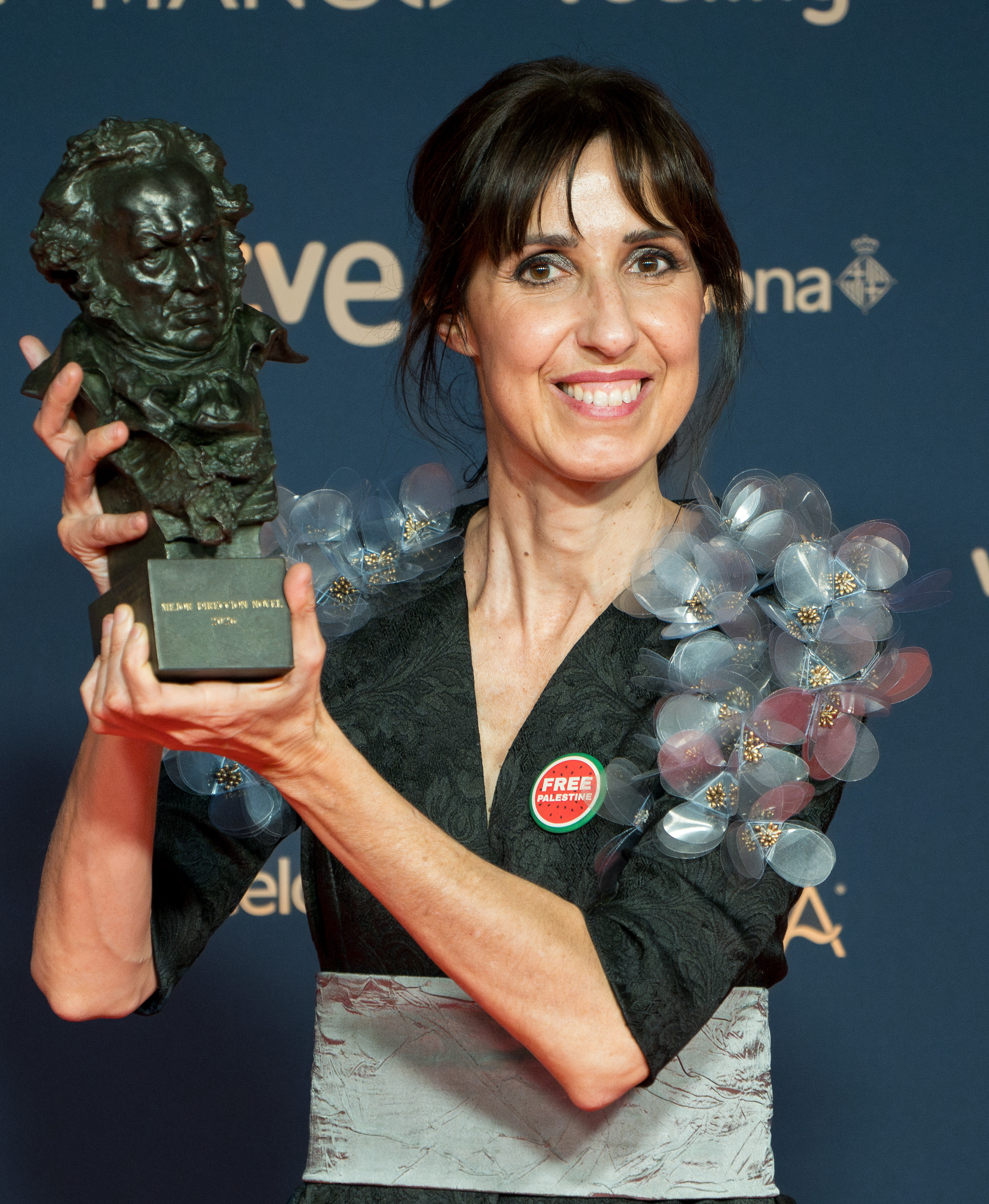
- The 2026 recipient: Eva Libertad
- Native name: Premio Goya a la mejor dirección novel
- Awarded for: Best debuting direction of a Spanish film of the year
- Country: Spain
- Presented by: Academy of Cinematographic Arts and Sciences of Spain (AACCE)
- First award: 4th Goya Awards (1989)
- Most recent winner: Eva Libertad; Deaf (2025)
- Website: Official website

The Goya Award for Best New Director (Spanish: Premio Goya a la mejor dirección novel) is one of the Goya Awards presented annually by the Academy of Cinematographic Arts and Sciences of Spain (AACCE) since the 4th edition of the awards in 1989. It is given in honor of a debuting film director or directing team that has demonstrated outstanding directing ability in making a Spanish film.

== History ==
The award was first presented at the fourth edition of the Goya Awards with Ana Díez being the first winner for her film Ander eta Yul.

Three directors have won this category and later have received the Best Director award, Alejandro Amenábar won for Tesis (1996) and went on to win Best Director twice, for The Others (2001) and The Sea Inside (2005); Fernando León de Aranoa won for Familia (1997) and later won Best Director thrice, for Barrio (1998), Mondays in the Sun (2002) and The Good Boss (2022); and Juan Antonio Bayona won for The Orphanage (2007) and went on to win Best Director twice, for The Impossible (2012) and A Monster Calls (2016).

Five films have won both this award and Best Film, Agustín Díaz Yanes's Nobody Will Speak of Us When We're Dead (1995), Alejandro Amenábar's Tesis (1996), Achero Mañas's Pellet (2000), Raúl Arévalo's The Fury of a Patient Man (2016) and Pilar Palomero's Schoolgirls (2020). Animator Enrique Gato became the first to historically win the award for an animated film with Tad, The Lost Explorer.

At the 40th Goya Awards, the academy announced changes in the eligibility criteria for the category, changing the nature of the debut work from first ICAA-assessed feature film to first feature film released in theatres.

== Winners and nominees ==
In the following table, the years are listed as per Academy convention, and generally correspond to the year of film release; the ceremonies are always held the following year.

Table key
‡	Indicates the winner

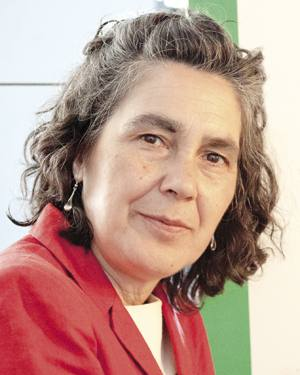
Ana Díez was the first winner of this award for Ander eta Yul (1989).

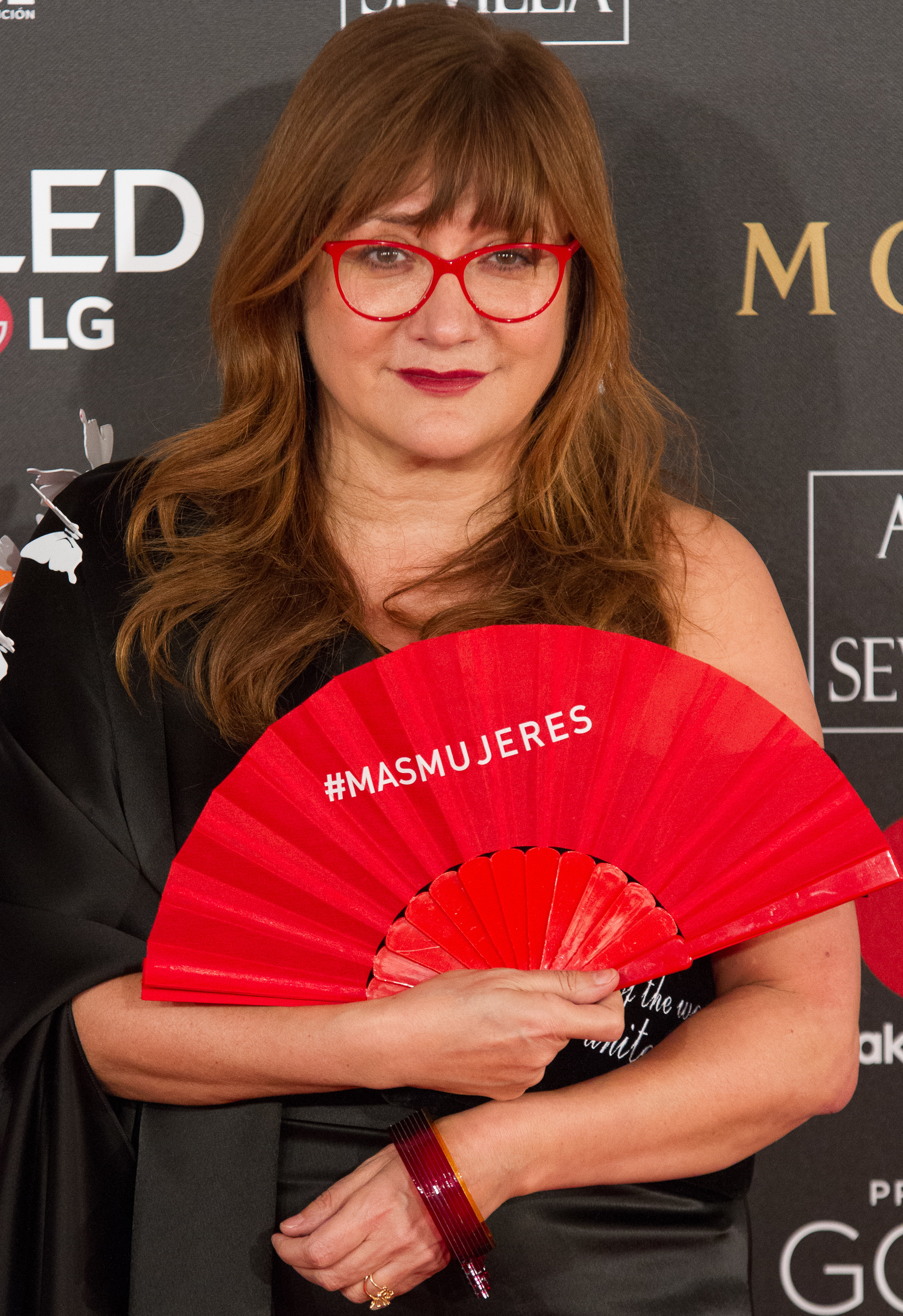
Isabel Coixet was nominated for Massa vell per morir jove (1989) and went on to win Best Director twice, for The Secret Life of Words (2005) and The Bookshop (2017).

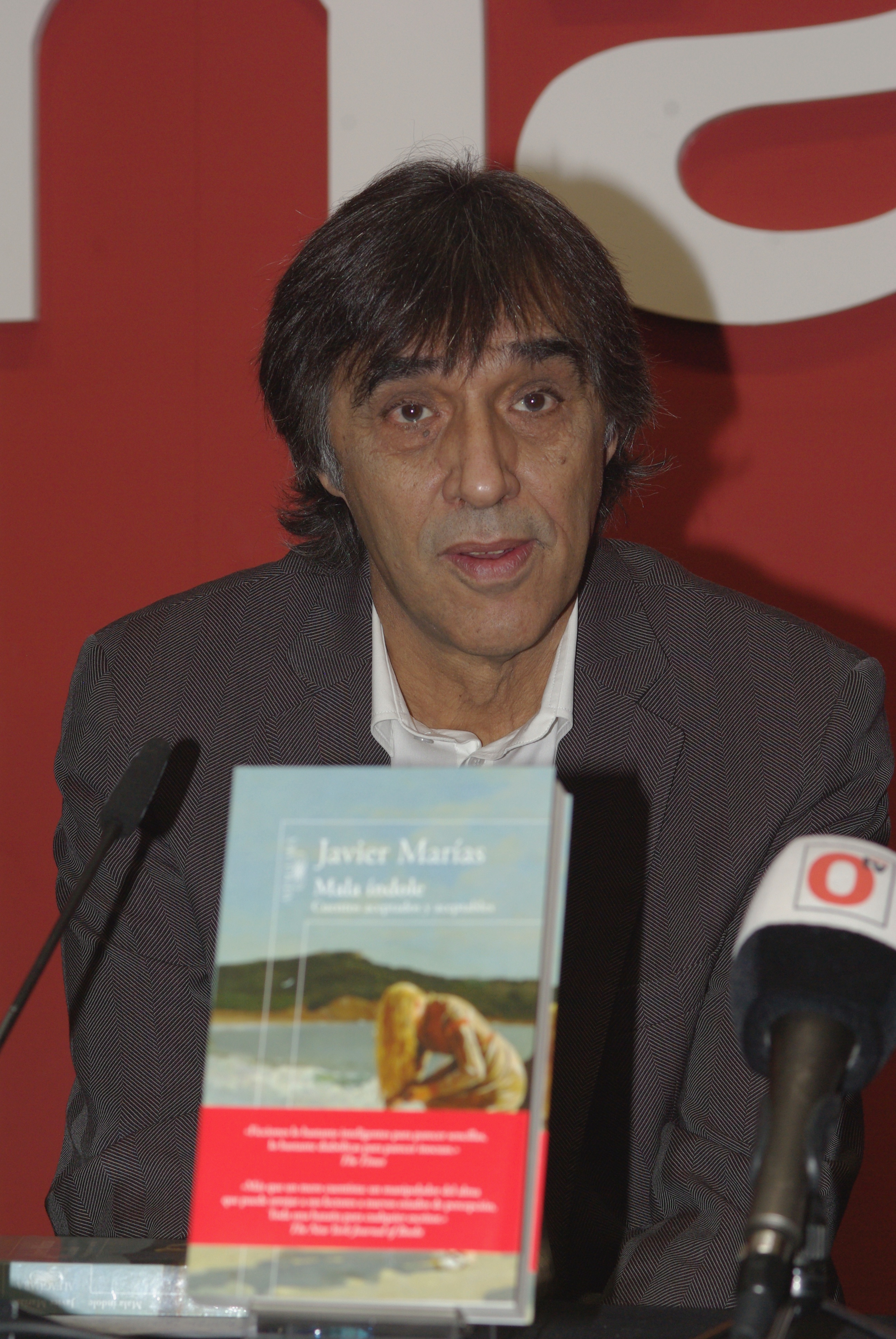
Agustín Díaz Yanes won for Nobody Will Speak of Us When We're Dead (1995).

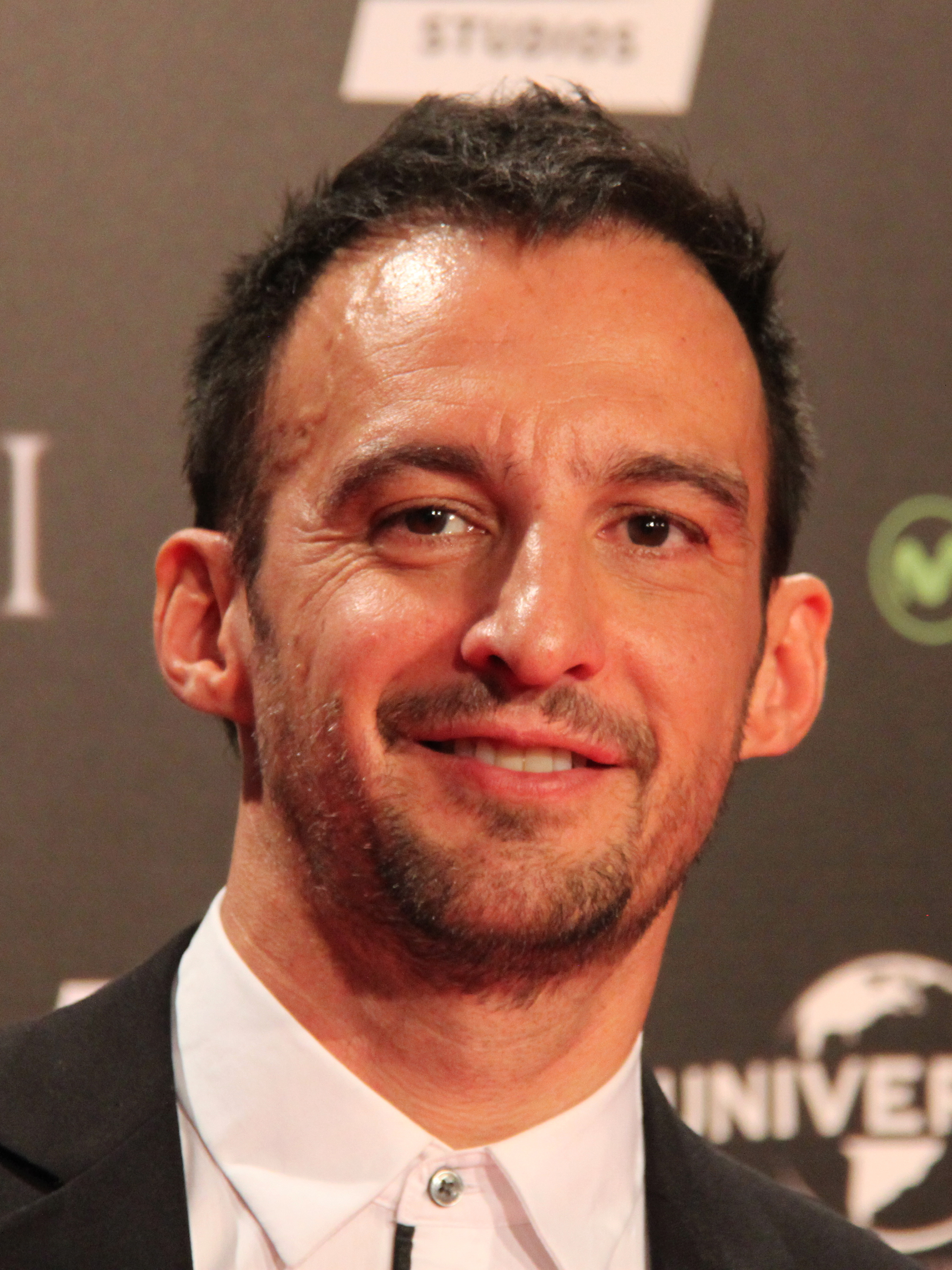
Alejandro Amenábar won for Tesis (1996) and went on to win Best Director twice, for The Others (2001) and The Sea Inside (2005).

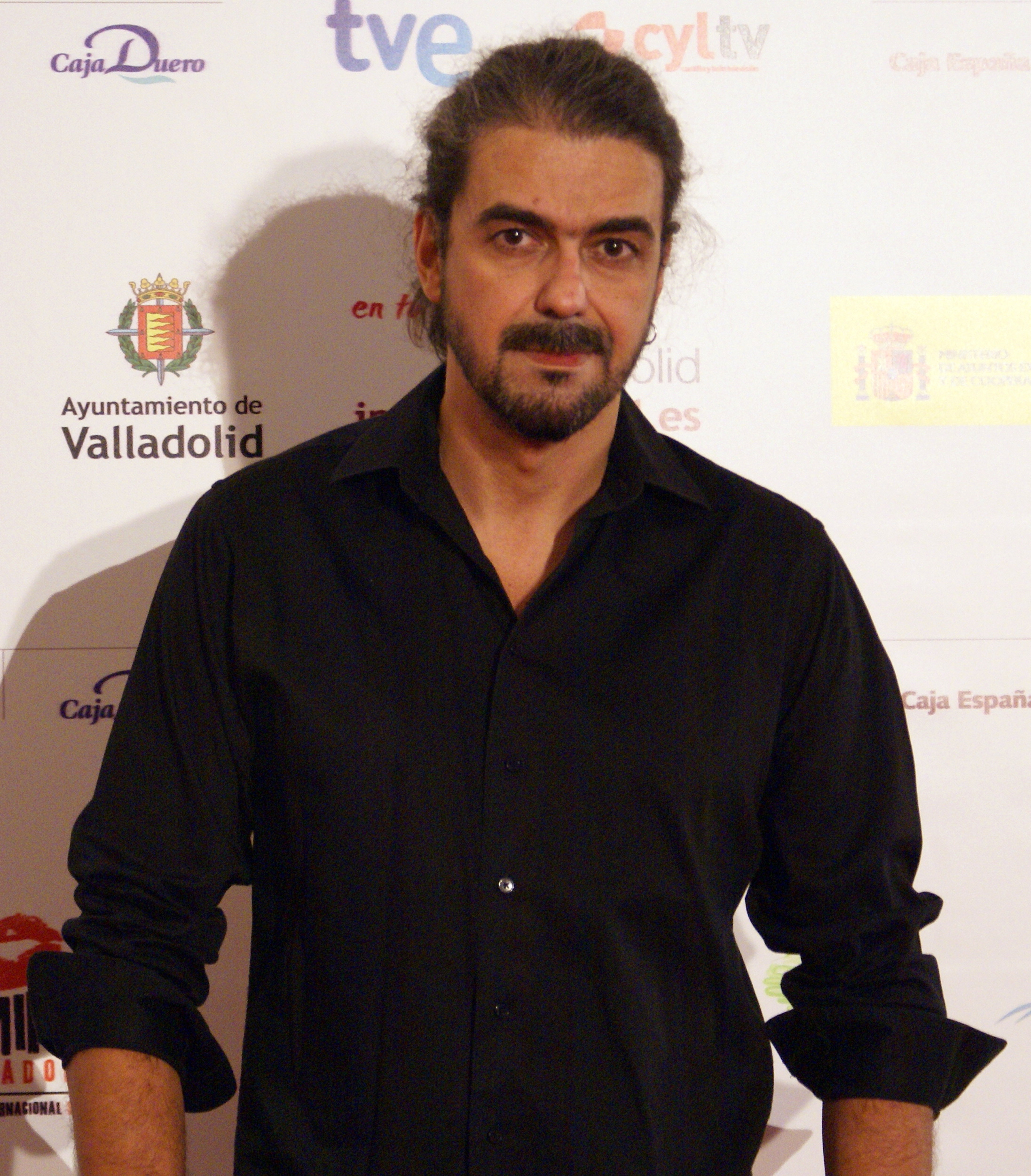
Fernando León de Aranoa won for Familia (1997) and went on to win Best Director thrice, for Barrio (1998), Mondays in the Sun (2002) and The Good Boss (2022).

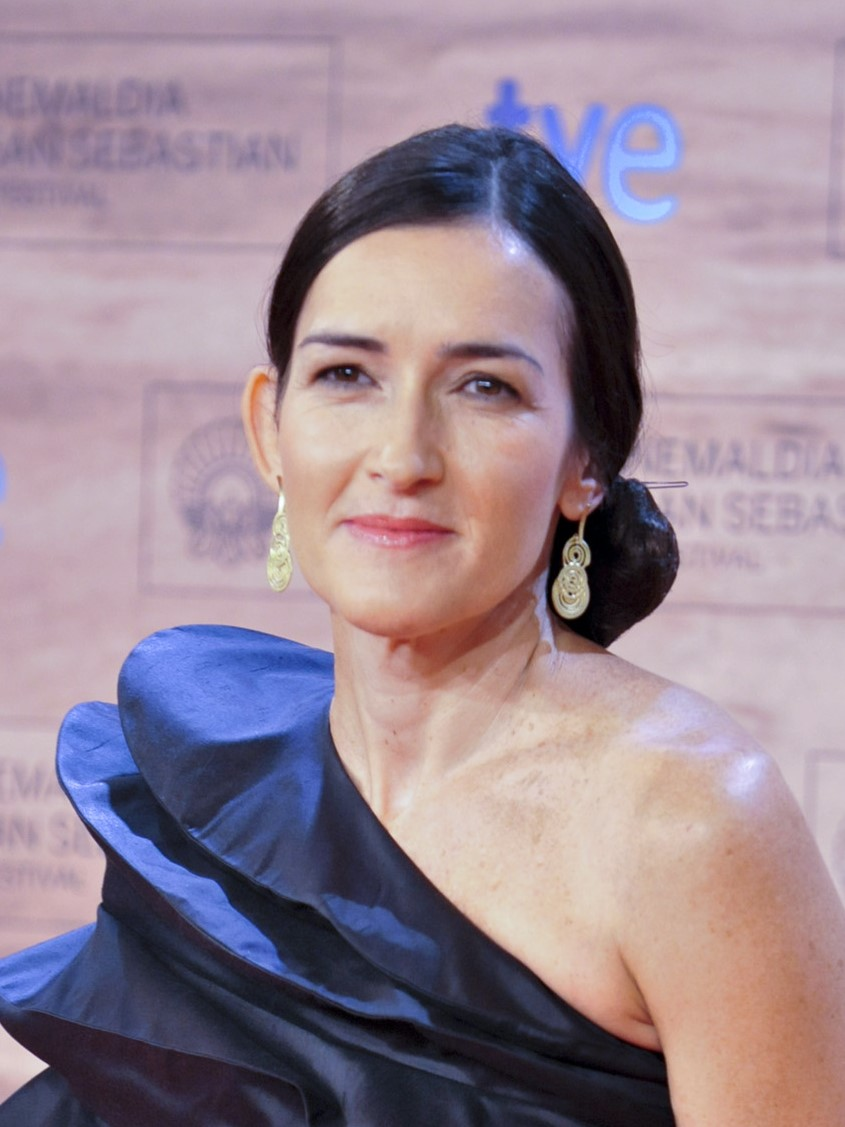
Ángeles González Sinde won for Sleeping Luck (2003).

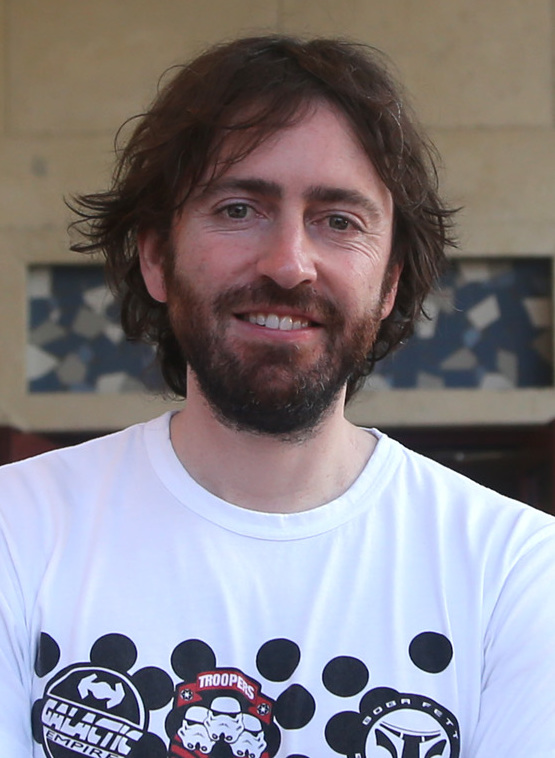
Daniel Sánchez Arévalo won for DarkBlueAlmostBlack (2006).

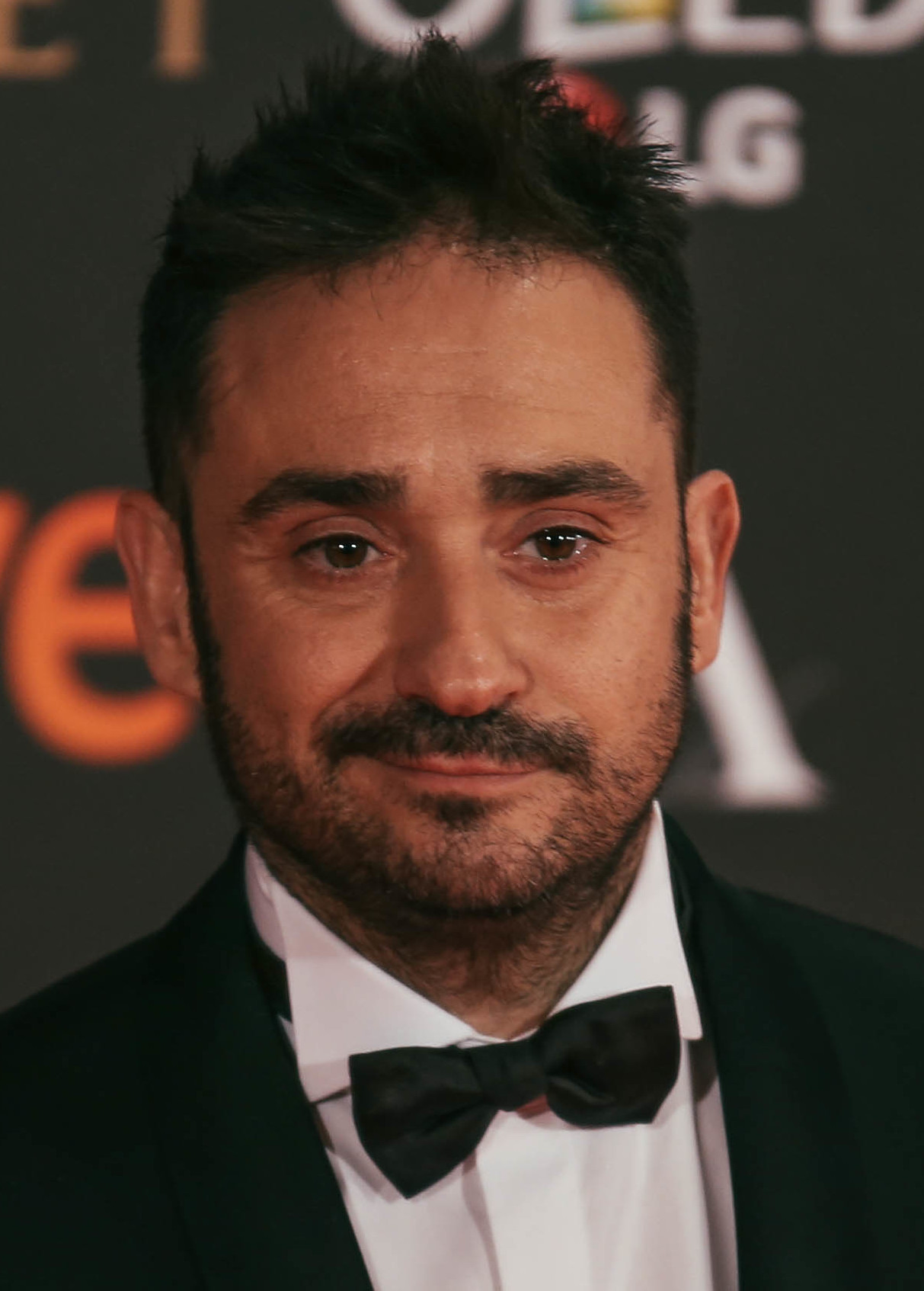
Juan Antonio Bayona won for The Orphanage (2007) and went on to win Best Director three times, for The Impossible (2012), A Monster Calls (2016) and Society of the Snow (2023).

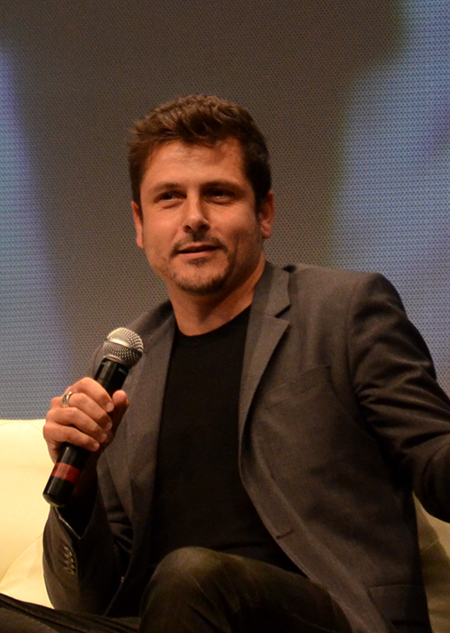
Kike Maíllo won for Eva (2011).

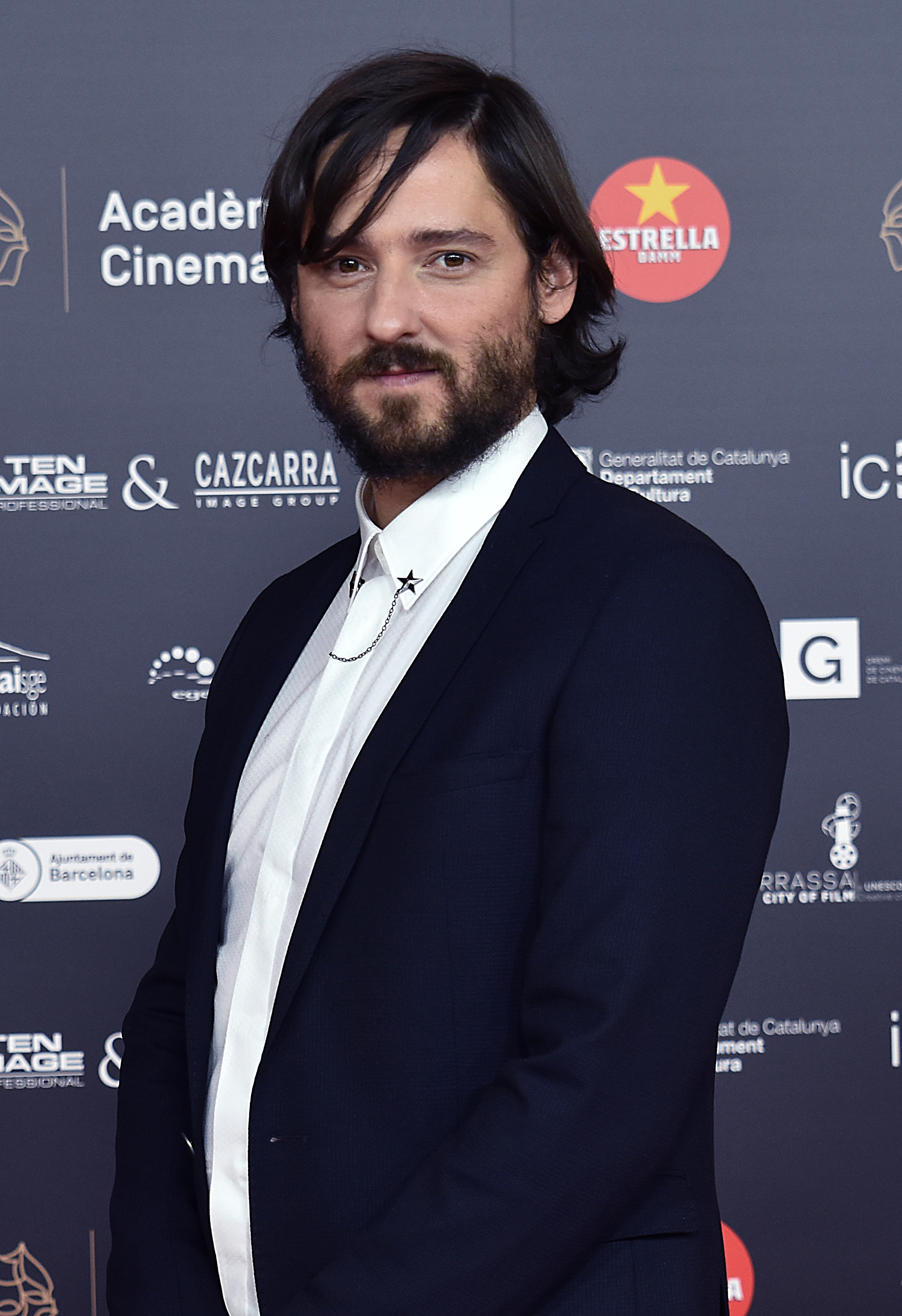
Carlos Marqués-Marcet won for 10,000 km (2014).

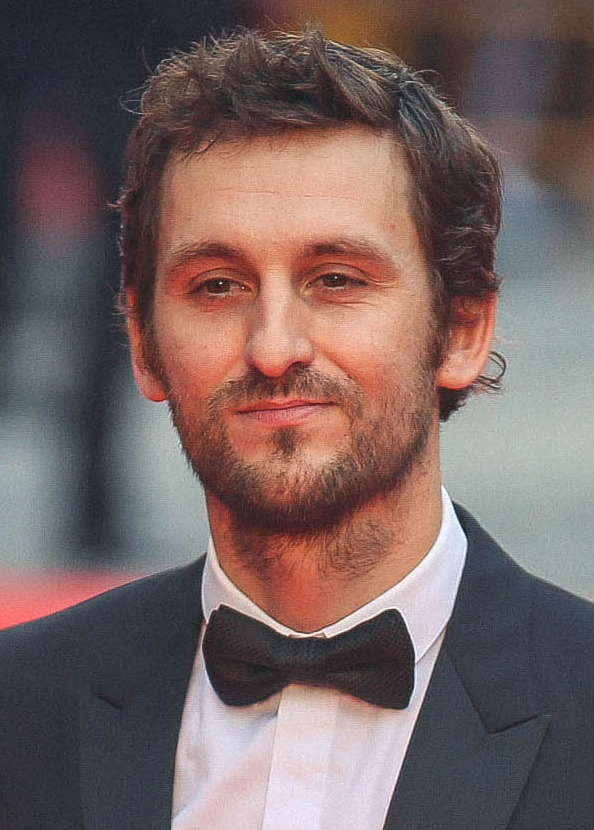
Raúl Arévalo won for The Fury of a Patient Man (2016).

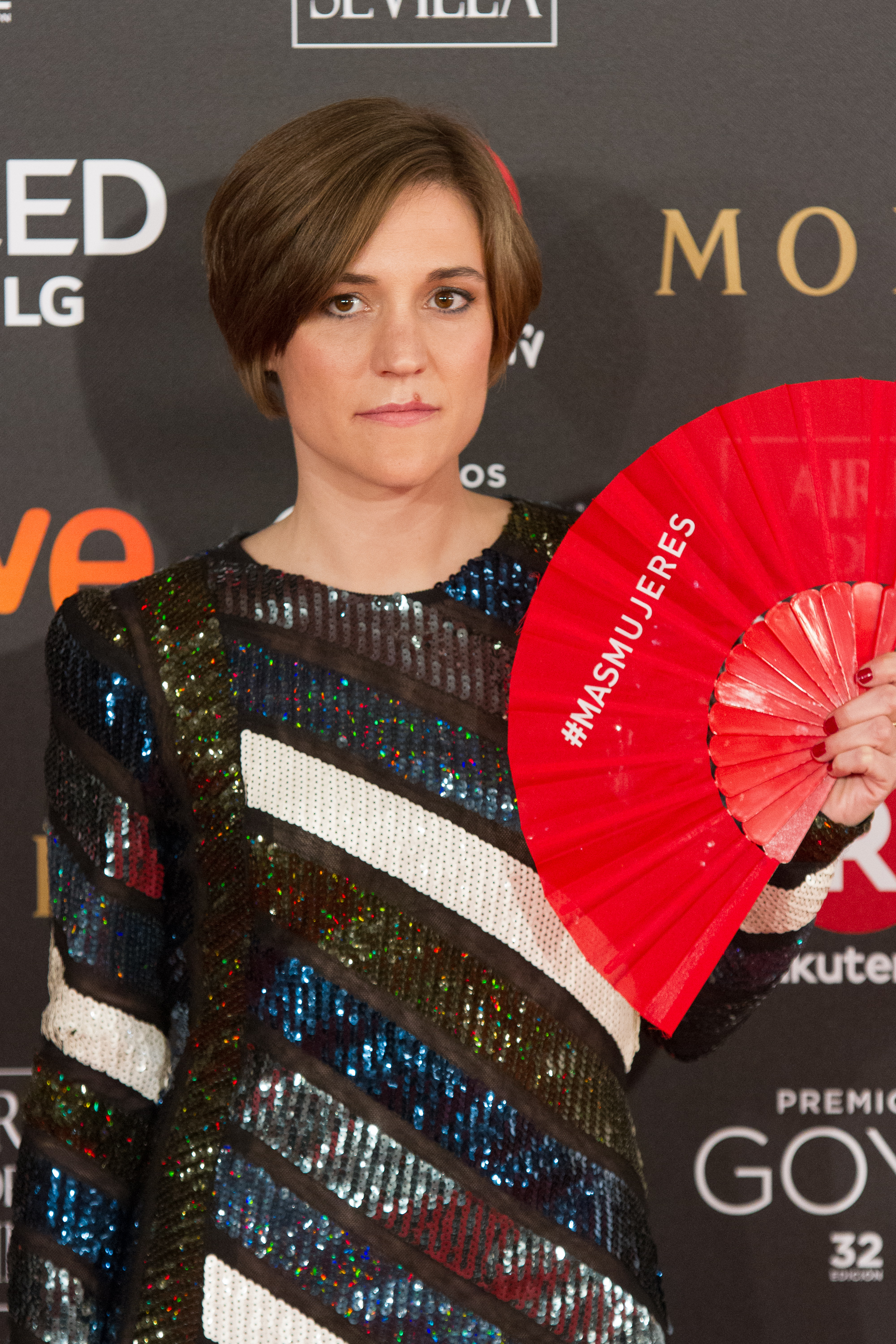
Carla Simón won for Summer 1993 (2017).

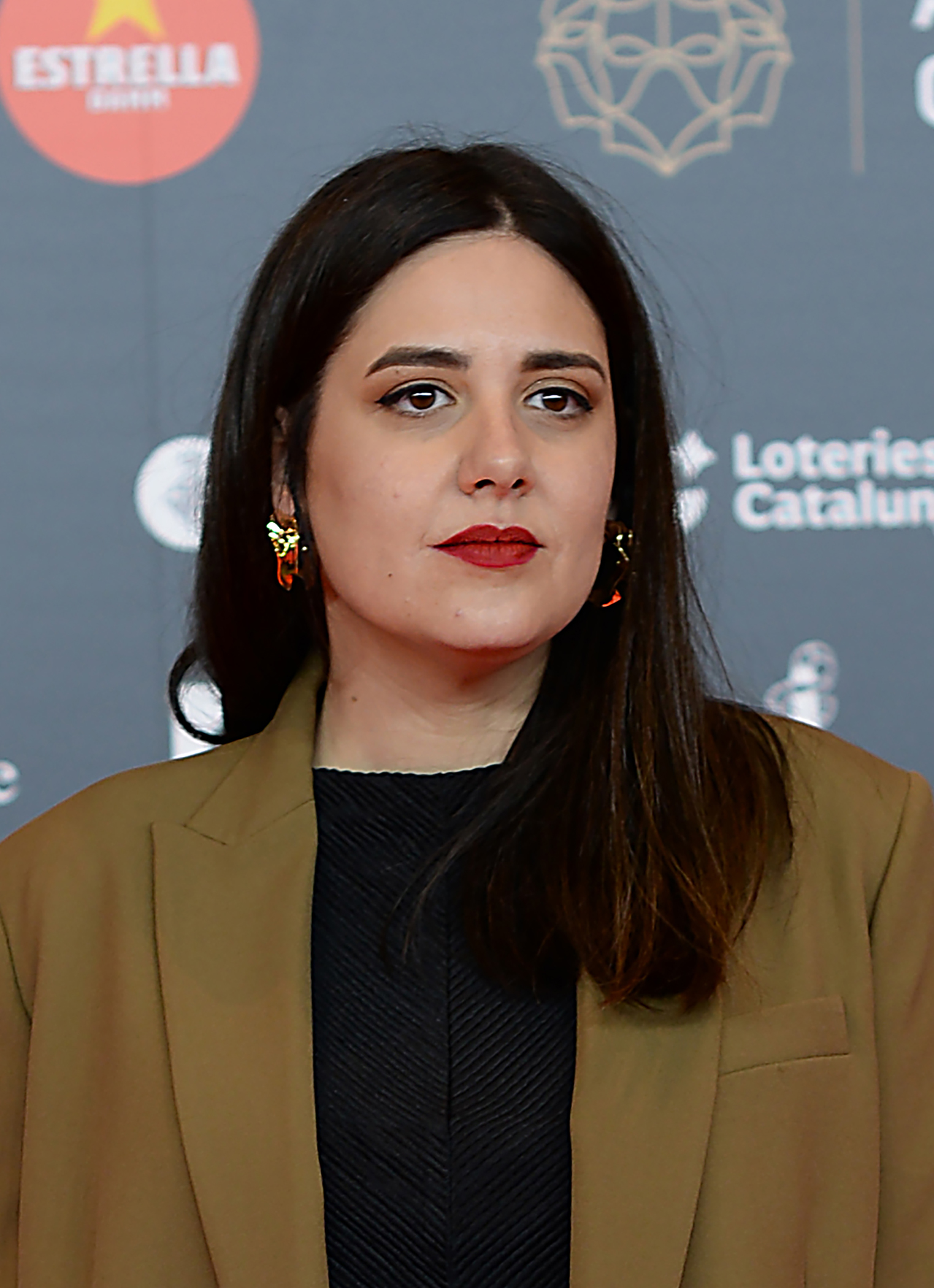
Belén Funes won for A Thief's Daughter (2019).

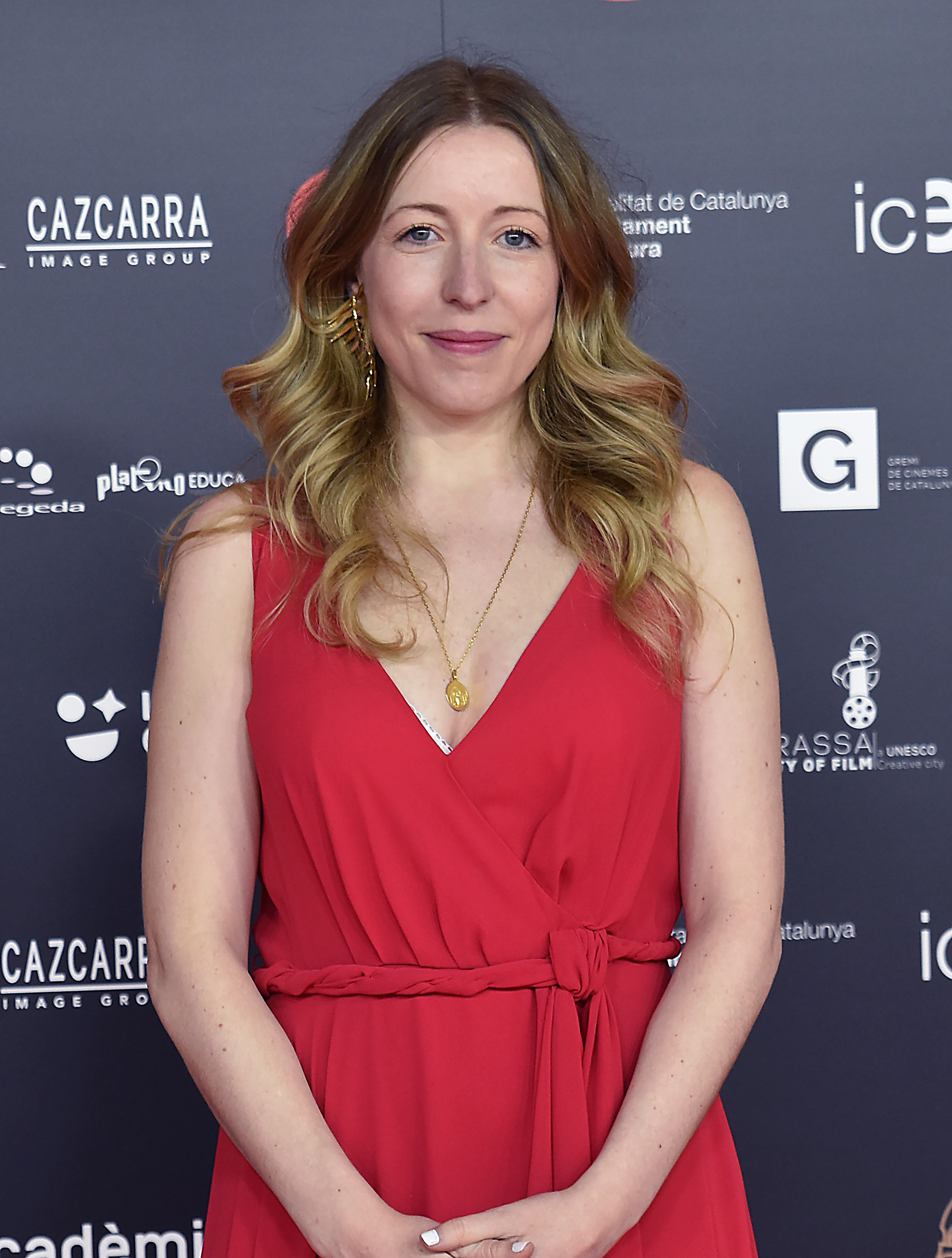
Pilar Palomero won for Schoolgirls (2020).

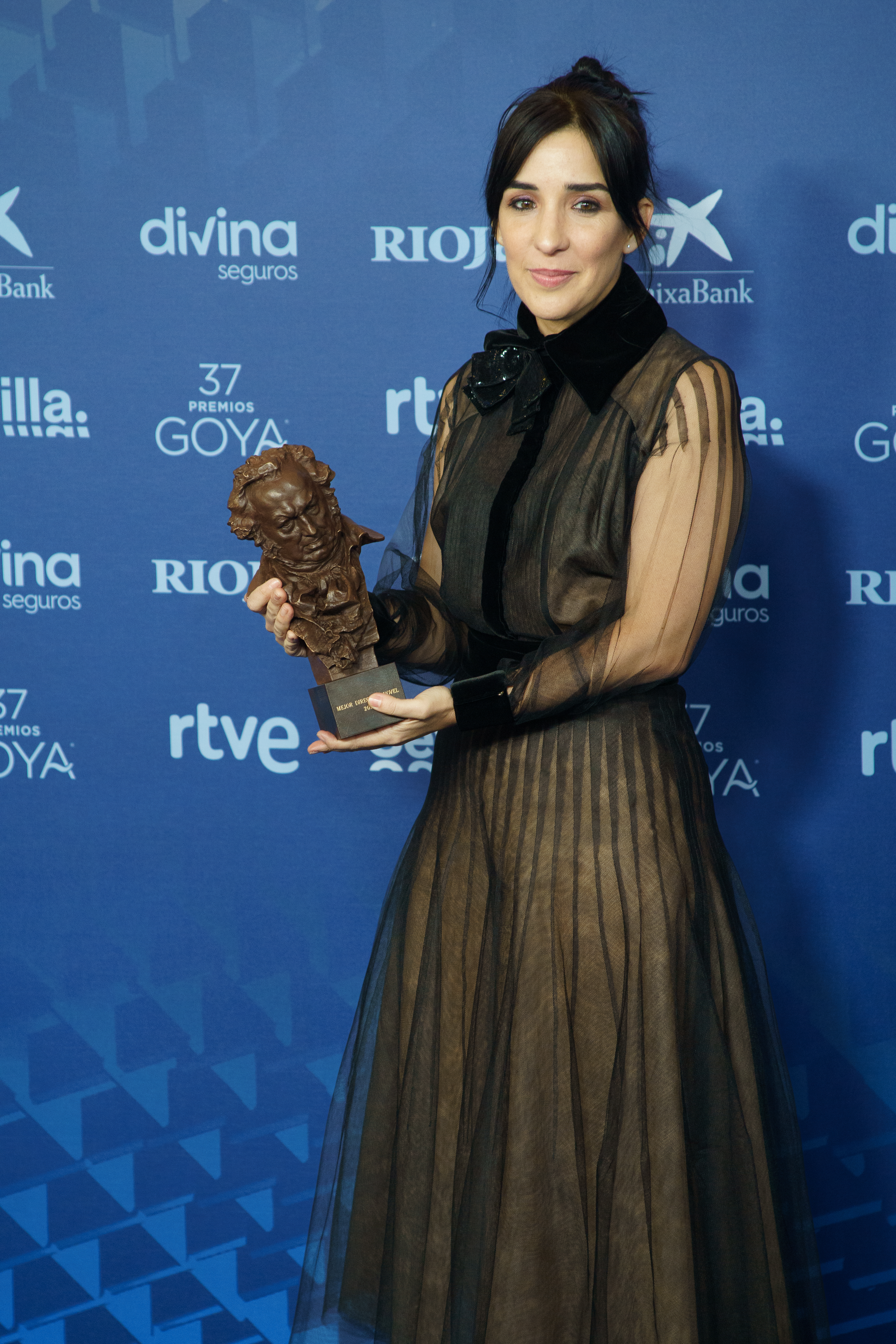
Alauda Ruiz de Azúa won for Lullaby (2022).

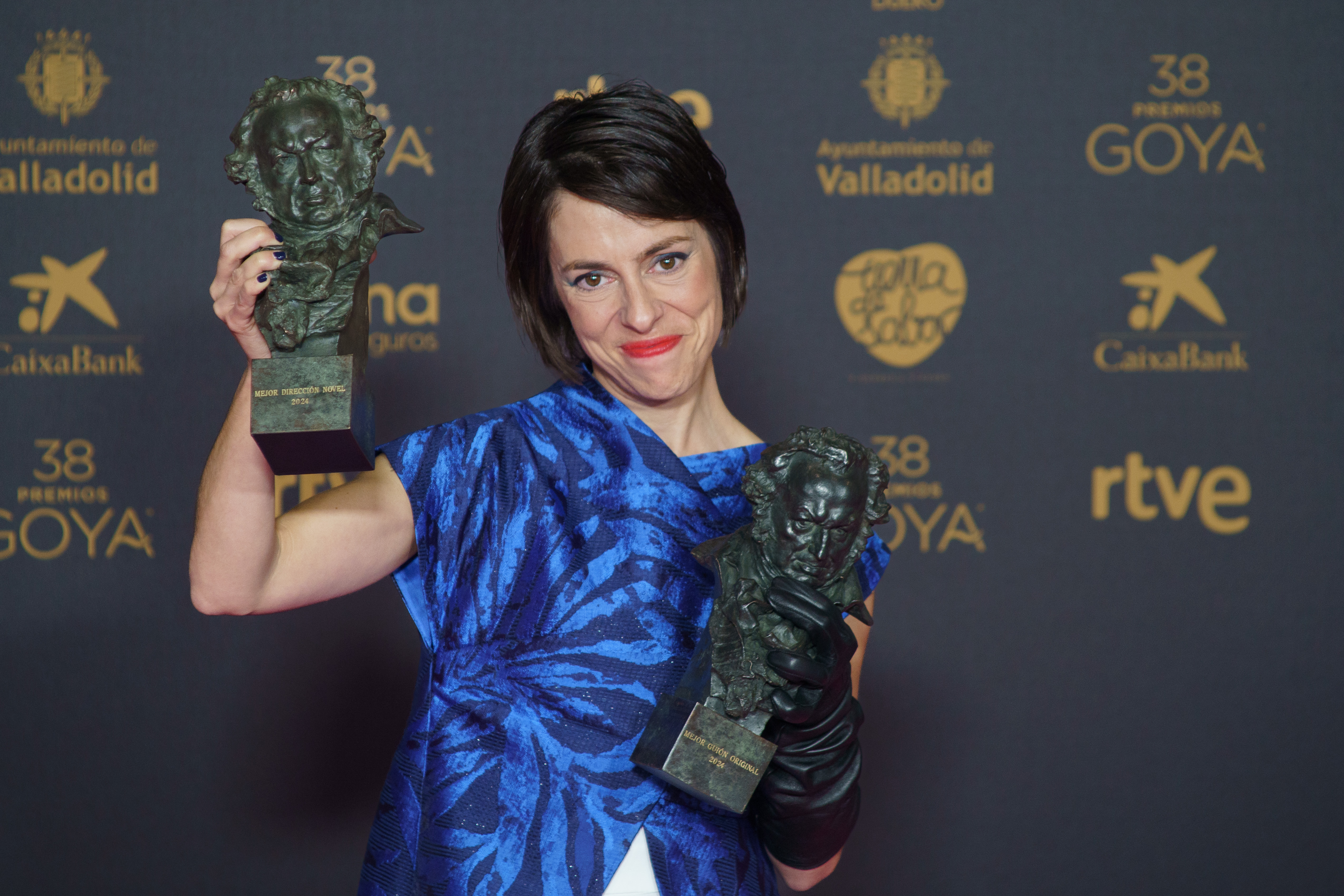
Estibaliz Urresola Solaguren won for 20,000 Species of Bees (2023).

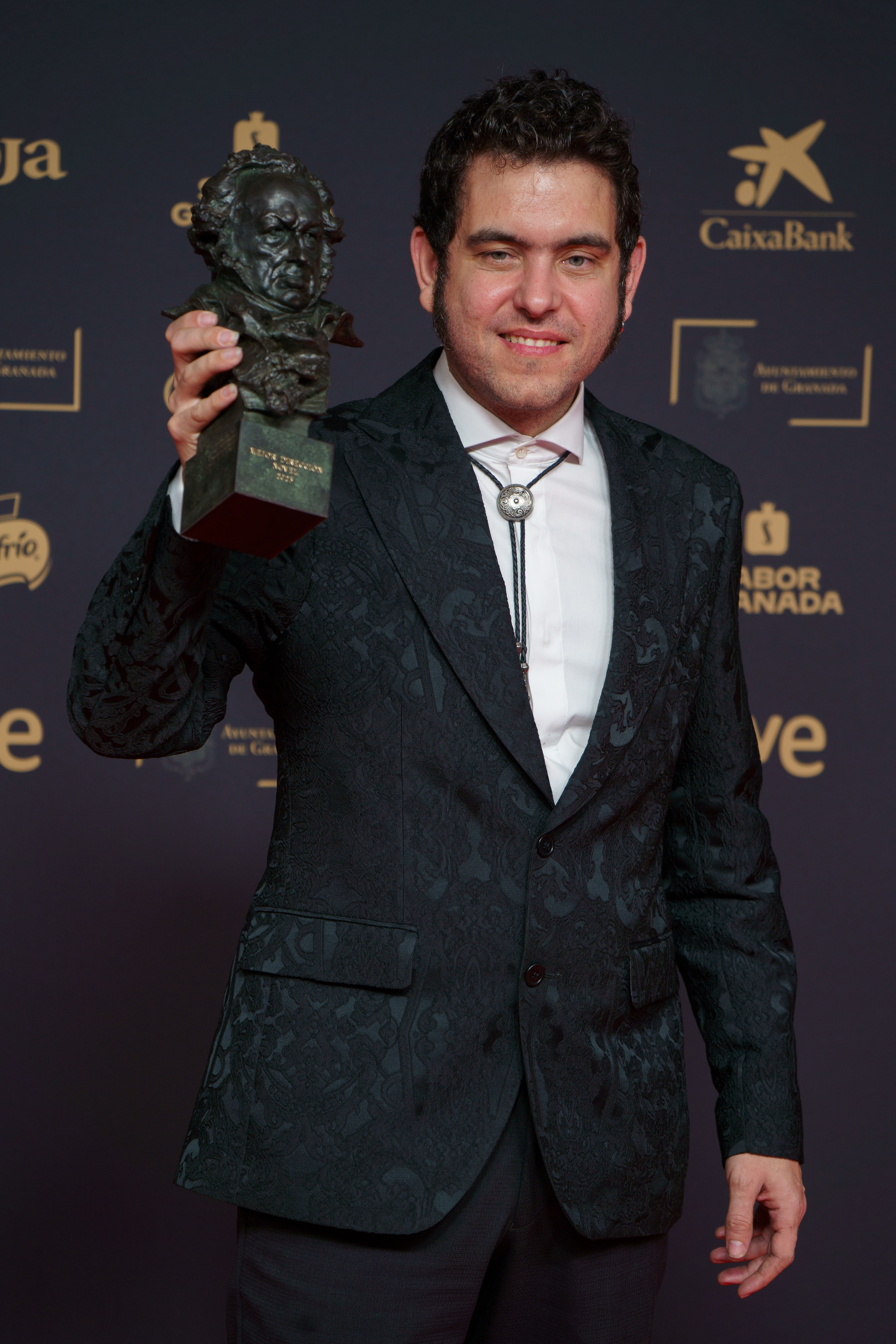
Javier Macipe won for The Blue Star (2024).

=== 1980s ===
Year	Director(s)	English title	Original title
1989 (4th)	Ana Díez	Ander eta Yul	
1989 (4th)	Cristina Andreu	Brumal	
1989 (4th)	Isabel Coixet	Massa vell per morir jove	
1989 (4th)	Xavier Villaverde	Continental	
1989 (4th)	Teodoro Ríos and Santiago Ríos	Guarapo	

=== 1990s ===
Year	Director(s)	English title	Original title
1990 (5th)	Rosa Vergés	Boom Boom	
1990 (5th)	Paco Periñán	Against the Wind	Contra el viento
1990 (5th)	José María Carreño	Ovejas negras	
1991 (6th)	Juanma Bajo Ulloa	Butterfly Wings	Alas de mariposa
1991 (6th)	Ana Belén	Cómo ser mujer y no morir en el intento	
1991 (6th)	Manuel Gómez Pereira	Pink Sauce	Salsa rosa
1992 (7th)	Julio Médem	Vacas	
1992 (7th)	Álex de la Iglesia	Acción mutante	
1992 (7th)	Chus Gutiérrez	Sublet	
1993 (8th)	Mariano Barroso	My Soul Brother	Mi hermano del alma
1993 (8th)	José Ángel Bohollo	Ciénaga	
1993 (8th)	Arantxa Lazkano	Los años oscuros	
1994 (9th)	La Cuadrilla – Santiago Aguilar Alvear and Luis Guridi	Justino, a Senior Citizen Killer	Justino, un asesino de la tercera edad
1994 (9th)	Héctor Carré	Dame lume	
1994 (9th)	Álvaro Fernández Armero	It's All Lies	Todo es mentira
1995 (10th)	Agustín Díaz Yanes	Nobody Will Speak of Us When We're Dead	Nadie hablará de nosotras cuando hayamos muerto
1995 (10th)	Manuel Huerga	Antarctica	Antártida
1995 (10th)	Icíar Bollaín	Hola, ¿estás sola?	
1996 (11th)	Alejandro Amenábar	Thesis	Tesis
1996 (11th)	David Trueba	The Good Life	La buena vida
1996 (11th)	Alfonso Albacete, Miguel Bardem and David Menkes	Not Love, Just Frenzy	Más que amor, frenesí
1997 (12th)	Fernando León de Aranoa	Familia	
1997 (12th)	Mireia Ros	La Moños	
1997 (12th)	David Alonso and Fernando Cámara	Memorias del ángel caído	
1998 (13th)	Santiago Segura	Torrente, the Dumb Arm of the Law	Torrente, el brazo tonto de la ley
1998 (13th)	Javier Fesser	The Miracle of P. Tinto	El milagro de P. Tinto
1998 (13th)	Miguel Albaladejo	The First Night of My Life	La primera noche de mi vida
1998 (13th)	Salvador García Ruiz	Mensaka	Mensaka, páginas de una historia
1999 (14th)	Benito Zambrano	Alone	Solas
1999 (14th)	Miguel Bardem	The Ugliest Woman in the World	La mujer más fea del mundo
1999 (14th)	María Ripoll	The Man with Rain in His Shoes	
1999 (14th)	Mateo Gil	Nobody Knows Anybody	Nadie conoce a nadie

=== 2000s ===
Year	Director(s)	English title	Original title
2000 (15th)	Achero Mañas	Pellet	El Bola
2000 (15th)	Daniel Monzón	Heart of the Warrior	El corazón del guerrero
2000 (15th)	Cesc Gay	Nico and Dani	Krámpack
2000 (15th)	Patricia Ferreira	I Know Who You Are	Sé quién eres
2001 (16th)	Juan Carlos Fresnadillo	Intacto	
2001 (16th)	Víctor García León	No Pain, No Gain	Más pena que gloria
2001 (16th)	Carlos Molinero	Savages	Salvajes
2001 (16th)	Javier Balaguer	Mine Alone	Solo mía
2002 (17th)	Julio Wallovits and Roger Gual	Smoking Room	
2002 (17th)	Inés París and Daniela Fejerman	My Mother Likes Women	A mi madre le gustan las mujeres
2002 (17th)	Eduard Cortés	Nobody's Life	La vida de nadie
2002 (17th)	Ramón Salazar	Stones	Piedras
2003 (18th)	Ángeles González Sinde	Sleeping Luck	La suerte dormida
2003 (18th)	David Serrano	Football Days	Días de fútbol
2003 (18th)	Jaime Rosales	The Hours of the Day	Las horas de día
2003 (18th)	Pablo Berger	Torremolinos 73	
2004 (19th)	Pablo Malo	Cold Winter Sun	Frío sol de invierno
2004 (19th)	Santiago Amodeo	Astronauts	Astronautas
2004 (19th)	Vicente Peñarrocha	Body Confusion	Fuera del cuerpo
2004 (19th)	Ramón de España	Kill Me Tender	Haz conmigo lo que quieras
2005 (20th)	José Corbacho and Juan Cruz	Tapas	
2005 (20th)	Asier Altuna and Telmo Esnal	Aupa Etxebeste!	
2005 (20th)	Guillem Morales	The Uninvited Guest	El habitante incierto
2005 (20th)	Santiago Tabernero	Life and Colour	Vida y color
2006 (21st)	Daniel Sánchez Arévalo	DarkBlueAlmostBlack	Azuloscurocasinegro
2006 (21st)	Carlos Iglesias	Crossing the Border	Un franco, 14 pesetas
2006 (21st)	Javier Rebollo	Lola	Lo que sé de Lola
2006 (21st)	Jorge Sánchez-Cabezudo	The Night of the Sunflowers	La noche de los girasoles
2007 (22nd)	Juan Antonio Bayona	The Orphanage	El orfanato
2007 (22nd)	Félix Viscarret	Under the Stars	Bajo las estrellas
2007 (22nd)	Tomás Fernández	Suso's Tower	La torre de Suso
2007 (22nd)	Tristán Ulloa and David Ulloa	Modesty	Pudor
2008 (23rd)	Santiago Zannou	The One-Handed Trick	El truco del manco
2008 (23rd)	Belén Macías	My Prison Yard	El patio de mi cárcel
2008 (23rd)	Nacho Vigalondo	Timecrimes	Los cronocrímenes
2008 (23rd)	Irene Cardona	Un novio para Yasmina	
2009 (24th)	Mar Coll	Three Days With the Family	Tres dies amb la família
2009 (24th)	David Planell	The Shame	La vergüenza
2009 (24th)	Borja Cobeaga	Friend Zone	Pagafantas
2009 (24th)	Antonio Naharro and Álvaro Pastor	Me, Too	Yo, también

=== 2010s ===
Year	Director(s)	English title	Original title
2010 (25th)	David Pinillos	Bon Appétit	
2010 (25th)	Emilio Aragón Álvarez	Paper Birds	Pájaros de papel
2010 (25th)	Juana Macías	Plans for Tomorrow	Planes para mañana
2010 (25th)	Jonás Trueba	Every Song Is About Me	Todas las canciones hablan de mí
2011 (26th)	Kike Maíllo	Eva	
2011 (26th)	Paula Ortiz	Chrysalis	De tu ventana a la mía
2011 (26th)	Paco Arango	Maktub	
2011 (26th)	Eduardo Chapero-Jackson	Verbo	
2012 (27th)	Enrique Gato	Tad, the Lost Explorer	Las aventuras de Tadeo Jones
2012 (27th)	Paco León	Carmina or Blow Up	Carmina o revienta
2012 (27th)	Isabel de Ocampo	Evelyn	
2012 (27th)	Oriol Paulo	The Body	El cuerpo
2013 (28th)	Fernando Franco	Wounded	La herida
2013 (28th)	Neus Ballús	La plaga	
2013 (28th)	Jorge Dorado	Mindscape	
2013 (28th)	Rodrigo Sorogoyen	Stockholm	
2014 (29th)	Carlos Marqués-Marcet	10,000 km	
2014 (29th)	Juan Fernando Andrés and Esteban Roel	Shrew's Nest	Musarañas
2014 (29th)	Francisco Sánchez Varela	Paco de Lucía: La búsqueda	
2014 (29th)	Beatriz Sanchís	They Are All Dead	Todos están muertos
2015 (30th)	Daniel Guzmán	Nothing in Return	A cambio de nada
2015 (30th)	Dani de la Torre	Retribution	El desconocido
2015 (30th)	Juan Miguel del Castillo	Food and Shelter	Techo y comida
2015 (30th)	Leticia Dolera	Requirements to Be a Normal Person	Requisitos para ser una persona normal
2016 (31st)	Raúl Arévalo	The Fury of a Patient Man	Tarde para la ira
2016 (31st)	Salvador Calvo	1898, Our Last Men in the Philippines	1898, Los últimos de Filipinas
2016 (31st)	Marc Crehuet	The One-Eyed King	El rey tuerto
2016 (31st)	Nely Reguera	María (and Everybody Else)	María (y los demás)
2017 (32nd)	Carla Simón	Summer 1993	Estiu 1993
2017 (32nd)	Sergio G. Sánchez	Marrowbone	El secreto de Marrowbone
2017 (32nd)	Javier Ambrossi and Javier Calvo	Holy Camp!	La llamada
2017 (32nd)	Lino Escalera	Can't Say Goodbye	No sé decir adiós
2018 (33rd)	Arantxa Echevarría	Carmen & Lola	Carmen y Lola
2018 (33rd)	Andrea Jaurrieta	Ana by Day	Ana de día
2018 (33rd)	César Esteban Alenda and José Esteban Alenda	Not the End	Sin fin
2018 (33rd)	Celia Rico Clavellino	Journey to a Mother's Room	Viaje al cuarto de una madre
2019 (34th)	Belén Funes	A Thief's Daughter	La hija de un ladrón
2019 (34th)	Salvador Simó	Buñuel in the Labyrinth of the Turtles	Buñuel en el laberinto de las tortugas
2019 (34th)	Galder Gaztelu-Urrutia	The Platform	El hoyo
2019 (34th)	Aritz Moreno	Advantages of Travelling by Train	Ventajas de viajar en tren

=== 2020s ===
Year	Director(s)	English title	Original title
2020 (35th)	Pilar Palomero	Schoolgirls	Las niñas
2020 (35th)	David Pérez Sañudo	Ane Is Missing	Ane
2020 (35th)	Bernabé Rico	One Careful Owner	El inconveniente
2020 (35th)	Núria Giménez Lorang	My Mexican Bretzel	
2021 (36th)	Clara Roquet	Libertad	
2021 (36th)	Carol Rodríguez Colás	Girlfriends	Chavalas
2021 (36th)	Javier Marco	Josephine	Josefina
2021 (36th)	David Martín de los Santos	That Was Life	La vida era eso
2022 (37th)	Alauda Ruiz de Azúa	Lullaby	Cinco lobitos
2022 (37th)	Carlota Pereda	Piggy	Cerdita
2022 (37th)	Elena López Riera	The Water	El agua
2022 (37th)	Juan Diego Botto	On the Fringe	En los márgenes
2022 (37th)	Mikel Gurrea	Cork	Suro
2023 (38th)	Estibaliz Urresola Solaguren	20,000 Species of Bees	20.000 especies de abejas
2023 (38th)	Itsaso Arana	The Girls Are Alright	Las chicas están bien
2023 (38th)	Álvaro Gago	Matria	
2023 (38th)	Alejandro Rojas, Juan Sebastián Vasquez	Upon Entry	
2023 (38th)	Alejandro Marín	Love & Revolution	Te estoy amando locamente
2024 (39th)	Javier Macipe	The Blue Star	La estrella azul
2024 (39th)	Miguel Faus	The Quiet Maid	Calladita
2024 (39th)	Pedro Martín-Calero	The Wailing	El llanto
2024 (39th)	Sandra Romero	As Silence Passes By	Por donde pasa el silencio
2024 (39th)	Paz Vega	Rita	
2025 (40th)	Eva Libertad	Deaf	Sorda
2025 (40th)	Ion de Sosa	Balearic	
2025 (40th)	Jaume Claret Muxart	Strange River	Estrany riu
2025 (40th)	Gemma Blasco	Fury	La furia
2025 (40th)	Gerard Oms	Away	Molt lluny

== Statistics ==
The following list is for Best New Director nominees and winners that went on to win or be nominated for Best Director. The times that the directors won either of the categories are in bold.

Director(s)	Best New Director nominated work and result	Best Director nominated work(s) and result(s)
Isabel Coixet	**nominated** for Massa vell per morir jove (1989)	**nominated** for My Life Without Me (2003)
Isabel Coixet	**nominated** for Massa vell per morir jove (1989)	**won** for The Secret Life of Words (2005)
Isabel Coixet	**nominated** for Massa vell per morir jove (1989)	**nominated** for Nobody Wants the Night (2015)
Isabel Coixet	**nominated** for Massa vell per morir jove (1989)	**won** for The Bookshop (2017)
Isabel Coixet	**nominated** for Massa vell per morir jove (1989)	**nominated** for It Snows in Benidorm (2020)
Isabel Coixet	**nominated** for Massa vell per morir jove (1989)	**nominated** for Un amor (2023)
Juanma Bajo Ulloa	**won** for Butterfly Wings (1991)	**nominated** for The Dead Mother (1993)
Juanma Bajo Ulloa	**won** for Butterfly Wings (1991)	**nominated** for Baby (2020)
Manuel Gómez Pereira	**nominated** for Pink Sauce (1991)	**nominated** for Mouth to Mouth (1995)
Julio Médem	**won** for Vacas (1992)	**nominated** for Earth (1996)
Julio Médem	**won** for Vacas (1992)	**nominated** for Sex and Lucia (2001)
Álex de la Iglesia	**nominated** for Acción mutante (1992)	**won** for The Day of the Beast (1995)
Álex de la Iglesia	**nominated** for Acción mutante (1992)	**nominated** for Common Wealth (2000)
Álex de la Iglesia	**nominated** for Acción mutante (1992)	**nominated** for The Oxford Murders (2008)
Álex de la Iglesia	**nominated** for Acción mutante (1992)	**nominated** for The Last Circus (2010)
Manuel Huerga	**nominated** for Antarctica (1995)	**nominated** for Salvador (Puig Antich) (2006)
Icíar Bollaín	**nominated** for Hola, ¿estás sola? (1995)	**won** for Take My Eyes (2003)
Icíar Bollaín	**nominated** for Hola, ¿estás sola? (1995)	**nominated** for Mataharis (2007)
Icíar Bollaín	**nominated** for Hola, ¿estás sola? (1995)	**nominated** for Even the Rain (2010)
Icíar Bollaín	**nominated** for Hola, ¿estás sola? (1995)	**nominated** for Rosa's Wedding (2020)
Icíar Bollaín	**nominated** for Hola, ¿estás sola? (1995)	**nominated** for Maixabel (2021)
Alejandro Amenábar	**won** for Thesis (1996)	**nominated** for Open Your Eyes (1998)
Alejandro Amenábar	**won** for Thesis (1996)	**won** for The Others (2001)
Alejandro Amenábar	**won** for Thesis (1996)	**won** for The Sea Inside (2004)
Alejandro Amenábar	**won** for Thesis (1996)	**nominated** for Agora (2009)
Alejandro Amenábar	**won** for Thesis (1996)	**nominated** for While at War (2019)
David Trueba	**nominated** for The Good Life (1996)	**nominated** for Soldiers of Salamina (2003)
David Trueba	**nominated** for The Good Life (1996)	**won** for Living Is Easy with Eyes Closed (2013)
David Trueba	**nominated** for The Good Life (1996)	**nominated** for Jokes & Cigarettes (2023)
Fernando León de Aranoa	**won** for Familia (1997)	**won** for Barrio (1998)
Fernando León de Aranoa	**won** for Familia (1997)	**won** for Mondays in the Sun (2002)
Fernando León de Aranoa	**won** for Familia (1997)	**nominated** for A Perfect Day (2015)
Fernando León de Aranoa	**won** for Familia (1997)	**won** for The Good Boss (2021)
Javier Fesser	**nominated** for The Miracle of P. Tinto (1998)	**won** for Camino (2008)
Javier Fesser	**nominated** for The Miracle of P. Tinto (1998)	**nominated** for Champions (2018)
Benito Zambrano	**won** for Alone (1999)	**nominated** for Alone (1999)
Benito Zambrano	**won** for Alone (1999)	**nominated** for Habana Blues (2005)
Benito Zambrano	**won** for Alone (1999)	**nominated** for The Sleeping Voice (2011)
Mateo Gil	**nominated** for Nobody Knows Anybody (1999)	**nominated** for Blackthorn (2011)
Daniel Monzón	**nominated** for Heart of the Warrior (2000)	**nominated** for Cell 211 (2009)
Daniel Monzón	**nominated** for Heart of the Warrior (2000)	**nominated** for El Niño (2014)
Cesc Gay	**nominated** for Nico and Dani (2000)	**nominated** for In the City (2003)
Cesc Gay	**nominated** for Nico and Dani (2000)	**nominated** for Truman (2015)
Jaime Rosales	**nominated** for The Hours of the Day (2003)	**won** for Solitary Fragments (2007)
Pablo Berger	**nominated** for Torremolinos 73 (2003)	**nominated** for Blancanieves (2012)
Daniel Sánchez Arévalo	**won** for Dark Blue Almost Black (2006)	**nominated** for Family United (2013)
Juan Antonio Bayona	**won** for The Orphanage (2007)	**won** for The Impossible (2012)
Juan Antonio Bayona	**won** for The Orphanage (2007)	**won** for A Monster Calls (2016)
Juan Antonio Bayona	**won** for The Orphanage (2007)	**won** for Society of the Snow (2023)
Paula Ortiz	**nominated** for Chrysalis (2011)	**nominated** for The Bride (2015)
Paula Ortiz	**nominated** for Chrysalis (2011)	**nominated** for The Red Virgin (2024)
Rodrigo Sorogoyen	**nominated** for Stockholm (2013)	**nominated** for May God Save Us (2016)
Rodrigo Sorogoyen	**nominated** for Stockholm (2013)	**won** for The Realm (2018)
Rodrigo Sorogoyen	**nominated** for Stockholm (2013)	**won** for The Beasts (2022)
Salvador Calvo	**nominated** for 1898, Our Last Men in the Philippines (2016)	**won** for Adú (2020)
Carla Simón	**won** for Summer 1993 (2017)	**nominated** for Alcarràs (2022)
Carla Simón	**won** for Summer 1993 (2017)	**nominated** for Romería (2025)
Arantxa Echevarría	**won** for Carmen & Lola (2018)	**nominated** for Undercover (2024)
Pilar Palomero	**won** for Schoolgirls (2020)	**nominated** for Motherhood (2022)
Alauda Ruiz de Azúa	**won** for Lullaby (2022)	**won** for Sundays (2025)
