= 10th Goya Awards =

- Date: 27 January 1996
- Site: Palacio Municipal de Congresos de Madrid
- Hosted by: Verónica Forqué and Javier Gurruchaga

Highlights
- Best Film: Nobody Will Speak of Us When We're Dead
- Best Actor: Javier Bardem; Mouth to Mouth
- Best Actress: Victoria Abril; Nobody Will Speak of Us When We're Dead
- Most awards: Nobody Will Speak of Us When We're Dead (8)
- Most nominations: The Day of the Beast (14)

Television coverage
- Network: TVE

The 10th Goya Awards were presented in Madrid, Spain on 27 January 1996.

Nobody Will Speak of Us When We're Dead won the award for Best Film.

== Winners and nominees ==
=== Major award nominees ===
Best Film: Nobody Will Speak of Us When We're Dead; The Day of the Beast; Mouth to Mouth	Best Director: Álex de la Iglesia – The Day of the Beast; Pedro Almodóvar – The Flower of My Secret; Manuel Gómez Pereira – Mouth to Mouth
Best Actor: Javier Bardem – Mouth to Mouth; Álex Angulo – The Day of the Beast; Federico Luppi – Nobody Will Speak of Us When We're Dead	Best Actress: Victoria Abril – Nobody Will Speak of Us When We're Dead; Ariadna Gil – Antarctica; Marisa Paredes – The Flower of My Secret
Best Supporting Actor: Luis Ciges – In Heaven as on Earth; Fernando Guillén Cuervo – Mouth to Mouth; Federico Luppi – The Law of the Frontier	Best Supporting Actress: Pilar Bardem – Nobody Will Speak of Us When We're Dead; Chus Lampreave – The Flower of My Secret; Rossy de Palma – The Flower of My Secret
Best Original Screenplay: Nobody Will Speak of Us When We're Dead – Agustín Díaz Yanes; The Day of the Beast – Jorge Guerricaechevarría, Álex de la Iglesia and Manuel Gómez Pereira; Mouth to Mouth – Juan Luis Iborra, Joaquín Oristrell, Manuel Gómez Pereira and Naomi Wise	Best Adapted Screenplay: Stories from the Kronen – Montxo Armendáriz and José Ángel Mañas; The Lame Pigeon – Jaime de Armiñán; What It's All About – Ventura Pons
Best New Actor: Santiago Segura – The Day of the Beast; Juan Diego Botto – Stories from the Kronen; Carlos Fuentes – Antarctica	Best New Actress: Rosana Pastor – Land and Freedom; Amara Carmona – Gipsy Soul; María Pujalte – Among Reds
Best Spanish Language Foreign Film: Midaq Alley • Mexico; The Elephant and the Bicycle • Cuba; Sicario • Venezuela	Best European Film: Lamerica • Italy; Carrington • France/UK; The Madness of King George • UK
Best New Director: Agustín Díaz Yanes – Nobody Will Speak of Us When We're Dead; Icíar Bollaín – Hi, Are You Alone?; Manuel Huerga – Antarctica	Best Original Score: Nobody Will Speak of Us When We're Dead – Bernardo Bonezzi; The Day of the Beast – Battista Lena; What It's All About – Carles Cases

=== Other award nominees ===
Best Cinematography: Antarctica – Javier Aguirresarobe; The Day of the Beast – Flavio Martínez Labiano; Flamenco – Vittorio Storaro	Best Editing: Nobody Will Speak of Us When We're Dead – José Salcedo; The Day of the Beast – Teresa Font; Mouth to Mouth – Guillermo Represa
Art Direction: The Day of the Beast – José Luis Arrizabalaga and Biaffra; The Flower of My Secret – Wolfgang Burmann; La leyenda de Balthasar el castrado – Javier Fernández	Production Supervision: Nobody Will Speak of Us When We're Dead – José Luis Escolar; The Day of the Beast – Carmen Martínez; Mouth to Mouth – Josean Gómez
Best Sound: The Day of the Beast – Miguel Rejas, Gilles Ortion, José Antonio Bermúdez, Carlos Garrido and Ray Gillon; The Flower of My Secret – Bernardo Menz and Graham V. Hartstone; Mouth to Mouth – Carlos Faruolo, James Muñoz and Brian Saunders	Best Special Effects: The Day of the Beast – Reyes Abades, Juan Tominic and Manuel Horrillo; The City of Lost Children – Yves Domenjoud, Jean-Baptiste Bonetto, Olivier Gleyze and Jean-Christophe Spadaccini; El niño invisible – Juan Ramón Molina, Juan Tominic and Manuel Horrillo
Best Costume Design: La leyenda de Balthasar el castrado – Pablo Gago; The Day of the Beast – Estíbaliz Markiegi; The Law of the Frontier – María José Iglesias	Best Makeup and Hairstyles: The Day of the Beast – José Quetglás, José Antonio Sánchez and Mercedes Guillot; Nobody Will Speak of Us When We're Dead – Ana Lozano, Carlos Paradela and Jesús Moncusi; The Flower of My Secret – Juan Pedro Hernández and Antonio Panizza
Best Fictional Short Film: La madre; Escrito en la piel; Hábitos; Sólo amor	Best Animated Short Film: Caracol, col, col; Las partes de mí que te aman son seres vacíos

== Honorary Goya ==
- Federico G. Larraya
