= Pink Sauce (film) =

- Theatrical release poster
- Spanish: Salsa rosa
- Directed by: Manuel Gómez Pereira
- Screenplay by: Yolanda García Serrano; Joaquín Oristrell; Juan Luis Iborra; Manuel Gómez Pereira
- Produced by: Carlos Orengo; César Benítez
- Starring: Verónica Forqué; Maribel Verdú; Juanjo Puigcorbé; José Coronado; Julieta Serrano; Carmen Balagué; Fernando Colomo; Carlos Hipólito; Felipez Jiménez
- Cinematography: Fernando Arribas
- Edited by: Guillermo Represa
- Music by: El Combo Belga
- Production companies: Audiovisuales Nebli; Cristal PC
- Distributed by: Columbia Tri-Star Films de España
- Release date: 24 January 1992
- Country: Spain
- Language: Spanish

Pink Sauce (Spanish: Salsa rosa) is a 1992 Spanish screwball comedy film directed by Manuel Gómez Pereira. It stars Verónica Forqué, Maribel Verdú, Juanjo Puigcorbé, and José Coronado.

== Plot ==
The films begins with a rape attempt on Koro. After meeting each other, Ana and Koro bet who is the one to woo the other's husband first.

== Cast ==
- Verónica Forqué as Ana
- Maribel Verdú as Koro
- Juanjo Puigcorbé as Tomás
- José Coronado as Rosario
- Julieta Serrano as Mari Luz
- Fernando Colomo as Fede
- Carmen Balagué as Dr. Devesa
- Carlos Hipólito as Nel
- Felipe Jiménez as Loren
- Gabriel Garbisu as Ventura

== Production ==
A Nebli and Cristal co-production, the film was the directorial debut of Manuel Gómez Pereira, who wrote the screenplay together with Joaquín Oristrell, Yolanda García Serrano, and Juan Luis Iborra. The score was composed by the salsa group El Combo Belga.

== Release ==
The film was released theatrically in Spain on 24 January 1992.

== Accolades ==
Year	Award	Category	Nominee(s)	Result	Ref.
1992	6th Goya Awards	Best New Director	Manuel Gómez Pereira	Nominated	

== See also ==
- List of Spanish films of 1992
