= Antarctica (1995 film) =

- Theatrical release poster
- Spanish: Antártida
- Directed by: Manuel Huerga
- Screenplay by: Francisco Casavella
- Produced by: Andrés Vicente Gómez
- Starring: Ariadna Gil; Carlos Fuentes; José Manuel Lorenzo; Francis Lorenzo; Walter Vidarte; Iñaki Aierra; Ángel de Andrés López; Juana Ginzo; Cristina Hoyos; John Cale
- Cinematography: Javier Aguirresarobe
- Edited by: Ernest Blasi
- Music by: John Cale
- Production companies: Sogetel; Iberoamericana Films
- Release dates: 5 September 1995 (Venice); 8 September 1995 (Spain)
- Country: Spain
- Language: Spanish

Antarctica (Spanish: Antártida) is a 1995 Spanish thriller film directed by Manuel Huerga and written by Francisco Casavella which stars Ariadna Gil and Carlos Fuentes.

== Plot ==
The road movie-like fiction starts in Barcelona, then moving to other settings. María (a former rock star hooked on heroin) and Rafa flee from Velasco after the former seized a drug cache.

== Cast ==
- Ariadna Gil as María
- Carlos Fuentes as Rafa
- José Manuel Lorenzo as Velasco
- Francis Lorenzo as inspector
- Walter Vidarte as detective
- Iñaki Aierra
- Ángel de Andrés López as matón
- Juana Ginzo as abuela
- Cristina Hoyos
- John Cale as himself

== Production ==
The screenplay was penned by Francisco Casavella upon request from Manuel Huerga, who had unsuccessfully tried to adapt Casavella's novel El triunfo into a feature film. The film was produced by Sogetel SA and Iberoamericana Films with the participation of Canal+. Crew responsibilities were entrusted to Javier Aguirresarobe (cinematography), John Cale (music), and Ernest Blasi (editing), among others. Andrés Vicente Gómez is credited as producer, whereas Fernando de Garcillán and Pepo Sol took over executive production duties. The film was shot in Portugal.

== Release ==
Selected for the 'Fast Lane' lineup intended to showcase debut feature films, the film premiered at the 52nd Venice International Film Festival. It was theatrically released in Spain on 8 September 1995.

== Reception ==
David Stratton of Variety assessed that the film's "second half is more successful than the first", also pointing out that the film is "handsomely produced".

Casimiro Torreiro of El País considered the film "stimulating, sometimes brilliant and occasionally overwhelming", but he also pointed out that the plot features some elements left over (pertaining the gesticulating thug) as well as it is missing more definition from Vidarte's "unsettling" character.

== Accolades ==
Year	Award	Category	Nominee(s)	Result	Ref.
1996	10th Goya Awards	Best Actress	Ariadna Gil	Nominated	
1996	10th Goya Awards	Best New Director	Manuel Huerga	Nominated	
1996	10th Goya Awards	Best New Actor	Carlos Fuentes	Nominated	
1996	10th Goya Awards	Best Cinematography	Javier Aguirresarobe	Won	

== See also ==
- List of Spanish films of 1995
