= Love Can Seriously Damage Your Health =

- Theatrical release poster
- Spanish: El amor perjudica seriamente la salud
- Directed by: Manuel Gómez Pereira
- Written by: Yolanda García Serrano; Manuel Gómez Pereira; Juan Luis Iborra; Joaquín Oristrell
- Produced by: César Benítez; Manuel Gómez Pereira; Joaquín Oristrell
- Starring: Ana Belén; Juanjo Puigcorbé; Gabino Diego; Penélope Cruz
- Cinematography: Juan Amorós
- Edited by: Guillermo Represa
- Music by: Bernardo Bonezzi
- Production companies: Sogetel; BocaBoca Producciones; Le Studio Canal+; DMVB Films
- Distributed by: Columbia TriStar Films de España (Spain); Les Acacias (France)
- Release date: 10 January 1997
- Running time: 117 minutes
- Countries: Spain; France
- Language: Spanish

Love Can Seriously Damage Your Health (Spanish: El amor perjudica seriamente la salud) is a 1997 Spanish comedy film directed by Manuel Gómez Pereira and starring Ana Belén, Juanjo Puigcorbé, Gabino Diego and Penélope Cruz.

== Synopsis ==
In Paris, King Juan Carlos I offers a dinner at Hôtel Crillon. Diana (Ana Belén) meets Santi (Juanjo Puigcorbé), an old lover, who now is the King's bodyguard. They remember how they met each other, 30 years ago, in another hotel, in Madrid. Diana (Penélope Cruz) and Santi (Gabino Diego) met when The Beatles were going to play. He works in the hotel. She hides under John Lennon's bed because she's in love with the singer. But, what starts is an attraction between them. It is an impossible love because she wants to be rich and famous, and he is poor and has to join the Air Force. When they meet again, Diana has become a socialite, and Santi is a pilot. Both are married, but the love goes on...

== Cameo appearances ==
The film uses cameo appearances by real figures from vintage footage and other fields to great comic effect. They include John Lennon, Carmen Polo, Raphael, King Juan Carlos I and his daughters. There are other cameos during the film: actors Javier Bardem, Aitana Sánchez-Gijón or film director Fernando Colomo have got small roles.

== Production ==
The film was produced by Sogetel and BocaBoca Producciones.

== Reception ==
The film opened on 110 screens and grossed $982,575 for the week finishing second at the Spanish box office behind fellow opener Ransom.

== See also ==
- List of Spanish films of 1997
