= Josep Maria Flotats =

Spanish actor and theatre director (born 1939)

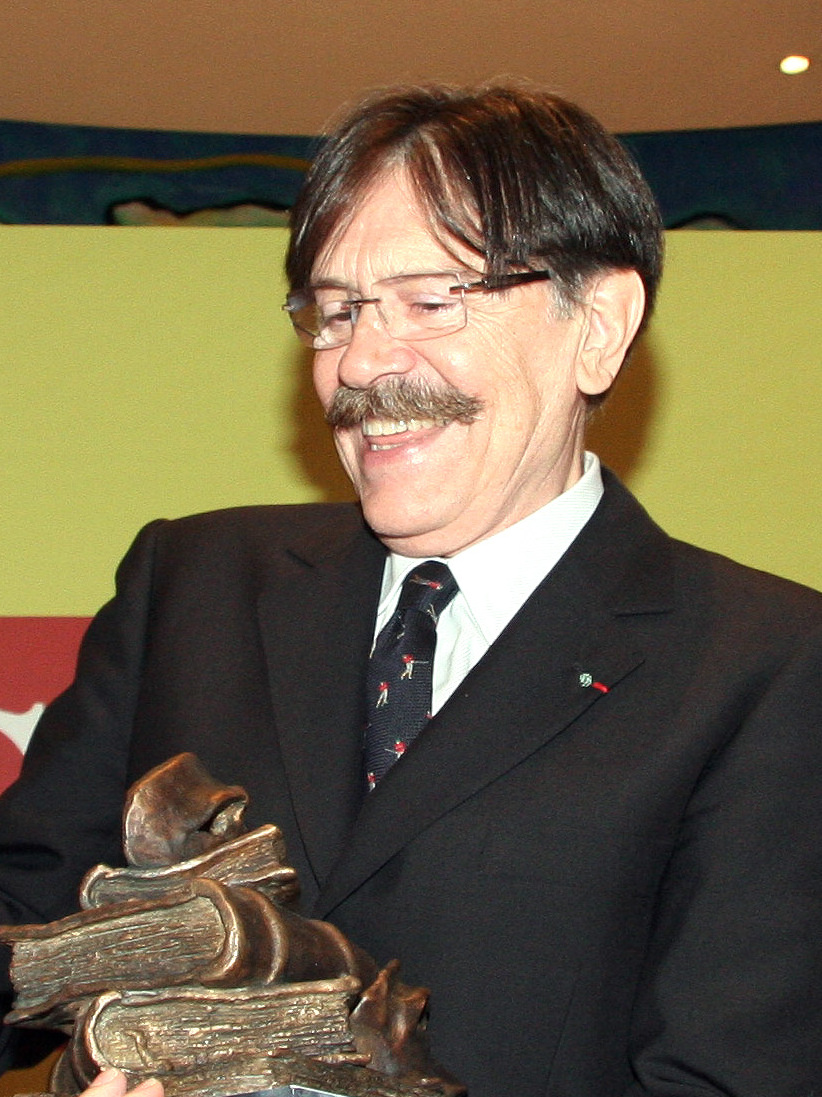
- Flotats in 2007
- Born: Josep Maria Flotats i Picas; 12 January 1939 (age 87); Barcelona, Catalonia, Spain
- Occupations: Actor; theatre director

Josep Maria Flotats i Picas (Catalan pronunciation: [ʒuˈzɛb məˈɾi.ə fluˈtats]; born 12 January 1939) is a Catalan actor and theatre director.

He was born in Barcelona, where he started as an actor in Associació Dramàtica de Barcelona, and made his theatre debut in 1957 with Les maletes del senyor Bernet.

He received a student grant to study drama in Strasbourg in 1959, and he joined the Théâtre National Populaire in 1967, Théâtre de la Ville in 1968, and French National Theatre Comédie Française in 1981.

In 1983, he went back to Catalonia with the play Dom Joan by Molière, and created the "Companyia Flotats" in 1984. From 1995 to his polemic dismissal in 1997, he was the principal of TNC (Catalan National Theatre)

He went to Madrid in 1998 and created the theatre company "Taller 75 S.L.". They debuted with Art, by Yasmina Reza.

== Theatre plays ==
Named by the language of the performance

- 2015: Ser-ho o no. Per acabar amb la qüestió jueva, by Jean-Claude Grumberg. Director and actor with Arnau Puig i Casas. Teatre Lliure de Barcelona.
- 2014: El joc de l'amor i l'atzar, by Pierre de Marivaux. Director. Production by TNC.
- 2007: "Stalin" by Marc Dugain. Director, adaptation, producer and actor. Teatre Tívoli, Barcelona.
- 2004: "La cena" by Jean-Claude Brisville. Director, actor and producer. Teatro Bellas Artes de Madrid. Spanish tour.
- 2002: "París 1940" by Louis Jouvet. Director, actor, adaptació i productor. Teatro Bellas Artes de Madrid. Spanish tour.
- 1998: "Arte" by Yasmina Reza. Director, adaptation, producer and actor. Teatro Marquina de Madrid. Spanish tour.
- 1997: "La Gavina" by Anton Chekhov. Director and actor. Companyia TNC de Barcelona.
- 1996: "Àngels a Amèrica" by Tony Kushner. Director. Companyia TNC de Barcelona.
- 1994: "Cal dir-ho" by Eugène Labiche. Director and actor. Companyia Flotats. Teatre Poliorama de Barcelona.
- 1993: "Tot assajant Dom Joan" by Louis Jouvet i Brigitte Jaques. Director and actor. Companyia Flotats. Teatre Poliorama de Barcelona.
- 1992: "Don Quijote: Fragmentos de un discurso teatral" by Mauricio Scaparro and Rafael Azcona. Dir.: Mauricio Scaparro. Spanish, Italian and New York tour.
- 1992: "Cavalls de mar" by Josep Lluis i Rodolf Sirera. Director. Companyia Flotats. Teatre Poliorama de Barcelona.
- 1990: "Ara que els ametllers ja estan batuts" by Josep Pla. Companyia Flotats. Teatre Poliorama de Barcelona. Spanish, Frankfort tour. Teatro María Guerrero de Madrid.
- 1989: "El misàntrop" by Molière. Director and actor. Companyia Flotats. Teatre Poliorama de Barcelona. Teatro Español de Madrid.
- 1988: "Lorenzaccio" by Alfred de Musset. Director and actor. Companyia Flotats. Teatre Poliorama de Barcelona. Teatro Español de Madrid.
- 1987: "El dret d'escollir" by Brian Clark. Director and actor. Companyia Flotats. Teatre Poliorama de Barcelona.
- 1986: "Infantillatges" by Raymond Cousse. Director. Companyia Flotats. Teatre Poliorama de Barcelona.
- 1986: "Per un sí o per un no" by Nathalie Sarraute. Director and actor. Companyia Flotats. Teatre Poliorama de Barcelona.
- 1986: "El despertar de la Primavera" by Frank Wedekind. Director and actor. Companyia Flotats. Teatre Poliorama de Barcelona.
- 1985: "Cyrano de Bergerac" by Edmond Rostand. Actor. Dir.: Mauricio Scaparro. Companyia Flotats. Teatre Poliorama de Barcelona. Teatro Pavón de Madrid.
- 1984: "Una jornada particular" by Ettore Scola. Director and actor. Companyia Flotats. Teatre Poliorama de Barcelona.
- 1983: "La seconde surprise de l'amour" by Marivaux. Dir.: Jean-Pierre Miquel. Comédie Française. Paris.
- 1983: "Intermezzo" by Jean Giraudoux. Dir.: Jacques Seyres. Comédie Francaise. Paris
- 1981: "Le bourgeois gentilhombre" by Molière. Dir.: Jean-Laurent Cochet. Comédie Française. Paris.
- 1981: "Don Juan" by Molière. Direcció: Jean-Luc Boutté. Comédie Française. Paris.
- 1981: "Les caprices de Marianne" by Alfred de Musset. Direcció: François Beaulieu. Comedie Française. Paris.
- 1981: "Andromaque" by Jean Racine. Dir.: Patrice Kerbrat. Comédie Française. Paris.
- 1981: "Sertorius" by Pierre Corneille. Dir.: Jean-Pierre Miquel. Comedie Française. Paris
- 1979: "Une Drôle de vie" by Brian Clark. Dir.: Michel Fagadu. Théâtre Antoine. Paris.
- 1978: "Zadig ou la destinée" by Voltaire. Dir.: Jean-Louis Barrault. Compagnie Renauld-Barrault. Théâtre d'Orsay. Paris.
- 1977: "En attendant Godot" by Samuel Beckett. Dir.: Otomar Krejca. Les Tréteaux de France. Festival d'Avignon.
- 1977: "Don Juan" by Molière. Dir.: Andreas Voutsinas. Les Tréteaux de France. French tour.
- 1976: "La guerra de Troie n'aura pas lieu" by Giradoux. Dir.: Jean Mercure. City Center Théâtre. New York, Montreal, Ottawa, Toronto and Quebec.
- 1976: "Les Brigands" by Schiller. Dir.: Anne Delbée. Théâtre de la Ville. Paris.
- 1975: "Le genre humain" by Jean-Edern Hallier. Dir.: Henri Ronse. Théâtre Espace Cardin. Paris.
- 1976: "Don Juan ou l'homme de cendres" by André Obey. Dir.: Jean-Pierre André. Festival de Vaison-La Romanie.
- 1975: "Othello" by William Shakespeare. Dir.: Georges Wilson. Théâtre d l'Est Parisien and Festival d'Avignon.
- 1974: "La création du Monde et autres business" by Arthur Miller. Dir.: Jean Mercure. Théâtre de la Ville. Paris
- 1972: "Le long voyage vers la nuit" by Eugene O'Neill. Dir.: Georges Wilson. Théâtre de l'Atelier. Paris.
- 1972: "Le Cid" by Corneille. Dir.: Denis Lorca. Théâtre de la Ville. Paris.
- 1971: "Les Possédés" by Fyodor Dostoevsky (Albert Camus version). Dir.: Jean Mercure. Théâtre de la Ville. Paris.
- 1971: "La guerre de Troie n'aura pas lieu" by Jean Giraudoux. Dir.: Jean Mercure. Théâtre de la Ville. Paris i Festival d'Avignon, Soviet Union tour.
- 1970: "Early Morning" by Edward Bond. Dir.: Georges Wilson. TNP. Paris and Festival d'Avignon
- 1969: "L'illusion comique" by Corneille. Dir.: Georges Wilson. TNP. Paris.
- 1969: "Oedipe Roi" by Sophocles. Dir.: Rafael Rodrigues. Théâtre de la Ville. Paris.
- 1969: "Pizaroo et le soleil" by Peter Shaeffer. Dir.: Jean Mercure. Théâtre de la Ville. Paris.
- 1968: "Six personages en quête d'auteur" by Luigi Pirandello. Dir.: Jean Mercure. Théâtre de la Ville. Paris.
- 1968: "Beaucoup de bruit pour rien" by Shakespeare. Dir.: Jorge Lavelli. Paris.
- 1967: "L'illusion comique" by Corneille. Dir.: Georges Wilson. TNP. Paris and Zurich.
- 1966: "Petit Malcom contre les Euneques" by David Haliwell. Dir.: Jacques Rousseau. Théâtre des Arts, Paris.
- 1966: "La bonne Âme de Setchouan" by Bertolt Brecht. Dir.: René Allio. Théâtre de la Region Parisiene.
- 1965: "Le cercle de craie caucasien" by Bertolt Brecht. Dir.: René Allio. Théâtre de la Commune d'Aubervilliers.
- 1965: "Aurélie" by Egérie Mavraki. Dir.: Jorge Lavelli. Théâtre de L'Oeuvre. Paris.
- 1964: "Victor ou les Enfants au Pouvoir" by Roger Vitrac. Dir.: Jean Anouilh. Productions d'Aujourd'hui. Tour in France, Belgium, Germany, Italy, Switzerland and Morocco.
- 1963: "Horace y la Mégère Appivoisée" by Shakaspeare. Comédie de l'Est. Estrasburg. Baalbeck.
- 1962: "Mille francs de récompense" by Victor Hugo. Dir.: Hubert Gígnoux. Comédie de l'Est. Strasbourg.
- 1962: "Six personages en quête d'auteur" by Pirandello. Dir.: Pierre Lefèvre. Comédie de l'Est. Strasbourg.
- 1962: "Horace" by Corneille. Dir.: Hubert Gígnoux. Comédie de l'Est. Strasbourg.
- 1957: "Les maletes del Senyor Bernet" by Claude Magnier. Debut professional. Dir.: Lluís Orduna. Compañía Lluís Orduna. Teatre Guimerà de Barcelona.

== Films ==
- 1995 Boca a boca. Director: Manuel Gómez Pereira
- 1992 "Promenades d’été". Director: René Féret
- 1975 "Jo, papá". Director: Jaime de Armiñán
- 1975 "Pim, pam, pum..¡fuego!". Director: Pedro Olea
- 1975 Aloïse. Director:Liliane de Kermadec
- 1975 That Most Important Thing: Love. Director:Andrzej Zulawski
- 1971 "L'araignée d'eau". Director:Jean-Daniel Verhaegue
- 1970 "L'amour". Director:Richard Balducci
- 1968 Tante Zita. Director:Robert Enrico
- 1966 "La guerre est finie". Director:Alain Resnais

== Television ==
- 1966 : Les anges exterminés, telefilm by Michel Mitrani
- 1967 : Salle n° 8, by Jean Dewever and Robert Guez
- 1968 : Sarn telefilm by Claude Santelli – Role: Gédéon
- 1969 : Les Frères Karamazov, réalisé par Marcel Bluwal – Role: Ivan
- 1971 : La Petite Catherine, telefilm by Alfred Savoir
- 1972 : Les Rois maudits – Role: Philip V of France
- 1974 : Le deuil sied à Electre, telefilm by Maurice Cazeneuve
- 1975 : Plus amer que la mort, telefilm by Michel Wyn – Role: Pierre Quadrel
- 1976 : Don Juan ou l'Homme de cendres, telefilm by Guy Lessertisseur - Role: Don Juan
- 1978 : Dom Juan – Role: Don Juan
- 1980 : Les visiteurs by Michel Wyn
- 1991 : Ara que els ametllers ja estan batuts – Role: Josep Pla

== Prizes ==
- Prix Gérard Philipe, 1970 Paris. "Best Actor", "La Guerre de Troie n 'Aura pas Lieu" by Jean Giradoux.Théâtre de la Ville.París.
- Prix de la critique française, 1980 Best Actor "Une Dròle de Vie" by Bryan Clark.Théâtre Antoine.París.
- Creu de Sant Jordi, 1982
- Premi nacional d'interpretació de la Generalitat de Catalunya, 1985 Cyrano de Bergerac.
- Premio Fotogramas de Plata, 1987 Cyrano de Bergerac.
- Premio Nacional de Teatro, 1989
- Premi de la crítica de Barcelona, temporada 1992-1993 Best Actor“Dom Joan”.
- Légion d'honneur, 1995.
- Premio de la Agrupación dramática de Barcelona, 1999
- Premio El ojo crítico de honor de RNE, 1999
- Premio de Cultura de la Comunidad de Madrid, 2002
- Premio de las Artes Escénicas de Castilla-La-Mancha
- Prizes with Arte
- 4 Premios Max de la SGAE 1999. Mejor espectáculo teatral, productor, director, traductor/adaptación.
- Premio Unión de Actores al mejor actor 1998.
- Premio Fotogramas de Plata 1999. Mejor actor
- Premio Ancora-Premio Oasis 1999
- Premio Cambio 16 1999
