= The Law of the Frontier =

- Theatrical release poster
- Spanish: La ley de la frontera
- Directed by: Adolfo Aristarain
- Screenplay by: Adolfo Aristarain
- Story by: Miguel Anxo Murado
- Produced by: José Luis Olaizola; Rafael Díaz-Salgado
- Starring: Pere Ponce; Aitana Sánchez-Gijón; Achero Mañas; Federico Luppi; Fernando Valverde; Enrique San Francisco; Agustín González; Antonio Gamero
- Cinematography: Porfirio Enríquez
- Edited by: Iván Aledo
- Music by: Bernardo Fuster; Luis Mendo
- Production companies: Central de Producciones Audiovisuales; Shazam
- Distributed by: United International Pictures
- Release date: 23 August 1995 (Spain)
- Countries: Argentina; Spain
- Language: Spanish

The Law of the Frontier (Spanish: La ley de la frontera) is a 1995 Argentine-Spanish adventure film directed by Adolfo Aristarain. It stars Pere Ponce, Aitana Sánchez-Gijón, Achero Mañas, and Federico Luppi.

== Plot ==
Set around 1925, in the Galician-Portuguese border, the plot follows the adventures of Galician working-class deserter Xan, Portuguese upper-class renegade seminarist Joao, The New York Times journalist Bárbara, and bandit "El Argentino".

== Cast ==
- Pere Ponce as Joao
- Aitana Sánchez-Gijón as Bárbara
- Achero Mañas as Xan
- Federico Luppi as Argentino
- Fernando Valverde as sargento de la Guardia Civil
- Enrique San Francisco as recaudador
- Agustín González as capitán de la Legión
- Antonio Gamero as barbero
- María Adánez as María
- Francisco Merino as maragato
- Tony Zenet as Octavio
- Felipe Vélez as cabo guardia
- José María Sacristán as administrador
- Emiliano Redondo as prior convento
- Ramiro Alonso as guardia civil 2
- Raquel Sanchís as mesonera
- Rubén Tobías as alcaide

== Production ==
The film is a Spanish-Argentine co-production by Central de Producciones Audiovisuales and Shazam, with the collaboration of Adai Filmes, TVE, Canal+, and Producciones Palermo.

== Release ==
Distributed by United International Pictures, it was released theatrically in Spain on 23 August 1995.

== Reception ==
Jonathan Holland of Variety described the film as "a bighearted, fast-paced '20s adventure story of multiple pursuits and disguises, deploying all the usual ingredients".

José Luis Sánchez Noriega mentioned the presence of dubious dialogue, multiple anachronisms and the lack of a Portuguese and Galician accent on the part of the characters of, respectively, Joao and Xan, unlike El Argentino's Argentinian accent, while conceding that, as an adventure, the film is still "entertaining".

== Accolades ==
| Year | Award | Category | Nominee(s) | Result | Ref. |
|---|---|---|---|---|---|
| 1996 | 10th Goya Awards | Best Supporting Actor | Federico Luppi | Nominated | |
| 1996 | 10th Goya Awards | Best Costume Design | María José Iglesias | Nominated | |

== See also ==
- List of Argentine films of 1995
- List of Spanish films of 1995
