= La leyenda de Balthasar el castrado =

- Directed by: Juan Miñón
- Produced by: Enrique Cerezo; Carlos Vasallo; Fernando Garcillán
- Starring: Imanol Arias; Coque Malla; Aitana Sánchez-Gijón
- Narrated by: Juan Luis Galiardo
- Cinematography: Acácio de Almeida
- Edited by: Luis Manuel del Valle
- Music by: Mario de Benito
- Production companies: Cartel; Sogetel; Scarabee Films; Animatografo
- Release dates: October 1995 (Mostra); 26 April 1996 (Spain)
- Countries: Spain; France; Portugal
- Language: Spanish

La leyenda de Balthasar el castrado is a 1995 internationally co-produced period drama film directed by Juan Miñón which stars Imanol Arias, Coque Malla, and Aitana Sánchez-Gijón.

== Plot ==
Set in 17th century Naples, the plot follows the relationship triangle between castrato singer Balthasar, the Duke of Arcos, and María de Loffredo.

== Cast ==
- Imanol Arias as duque de Arcos
- Coque Malla as Balthasar
- Enrique San Francisco as Andrés
- Helio Pedregal as Mateo Lerchundi
- Aitana Sánchez-Gijón as María de Loffredo
- Juan Luis Galiardo as narrador
- Rogério Samora as príncipe Terramare
- Carlos César as padre Conrado
- Dalila Carmo as Elvira
- Isabel de Castro as duquesa de Arcos

== Production ==
The film is a Spanish-French-Portuguese co-production by Cartel, Sogetel, Scarabee Films, and Animatógrafo.

== Release ==
The film entered into the 16th Mostra de València in October 1995. It was released theatrically in Spain on 26 April 1996.

== Reception ==
Augusto Martínez Torres of El País disfavourably compared the film to similarly themed Farinelli, otherwise finding "severe writing flaws, forcing the inclusion of a background voiceover to make the intrigue understandable" and production issues.

== Accolades ==
Year	Award	Category	Nominee(s)	Result	Ref.
1996	10th Goya Awards	Best Art Direction	Javier Fernández	Nominated	
1996	10th Goya Awards	Best Costume Design	Pablo Gago	Won	

== See also ==
- List of Spanish films of 1996
