= Entre rojas =

- Theatrical release poster
- Directed by: Azucena Rodríguez
- Written by: Myriam de Maeztu; Azucena Rodríguez; Mercedes de Blas
- Produced by: Fernando Colomo; Beatriz de la Gándara
- Starring: Penélope Cruz; Cristina Marcos; María Pujalte
- Cinematography: Javier Salmones
- Edited by: Miguel Ángel Santamaría
- Music by: Suburbano
- Release date: 20 April 1995 (Spain)
- Running time: 93 min
- Country: Spain
- Language: Spanish

Entre rojas is a 1995 Spanish drama directed by Azucena Rodríguez in her feature film directorial debut. It stars Penélope Cruz, Cristina Marcos and María Pujalte.

== Plot ==
Set in 1974, in the last rales of the Francoist dictatorship, the plot follows Lucía, a privileged woman entering the Prison of Yeserías, meeting women from different social strata.

== Cast ==
- Penélope Cruz as Lucía
- Cristina Marcos as Julia
- María Pujalte as Cata
- Ana Torrent as La Tacatún
- Blanca Portillo as Manuela
- Pilar Bardem as J. Monaco
- Carmelo Gómez as Pablo
- Beatriz Santiago
- Malena Gutiérrez
- Carmelo Gómez
- Karra Elejalde

== Accolades ==
Year	Award	Category	Nominee(s)	Result	Ref.
1996	5th Actors Union Awards	Best Newcomer	María Pujalte	Won	
1996	10th Goya Awards	Best New Actress	María Pujalte	Nominated	

== See also ==
- List of Spanish films of 1995

== Bibliography ==
- Buckley, Christine (1998). ‘Silence, Dance, and Disease as Spaces of Agency in the Spanish Film “Entre Rojas”’, Romance Languages Annual, 10.2: 473–76
- Farrelly, Mary (2022). The Mystical Political: Reclaiming the Spectacle of the Vision in Vicente Aranda's Libertarias (1996) and Azucena Rodríguez's Entre rojas (1995). Bulletin of Hispanic Studies (1475-3839), 99(4).
- Faulkner, Sally (2020). "Middlebrow cinema by women directors in the 1990s". Journal of Spanish Cultural Studies. 21 (1): 72. doi:10.1080/14636204.2020.1720985. S2CID 213682137.
