= Teatre Nacional de Catalunya =

Public theatre in Barcelona, Spain

Coordinates: 41°23′59″N 2°11′10″E

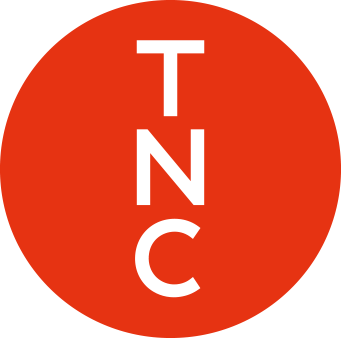
- Logo of the TNC

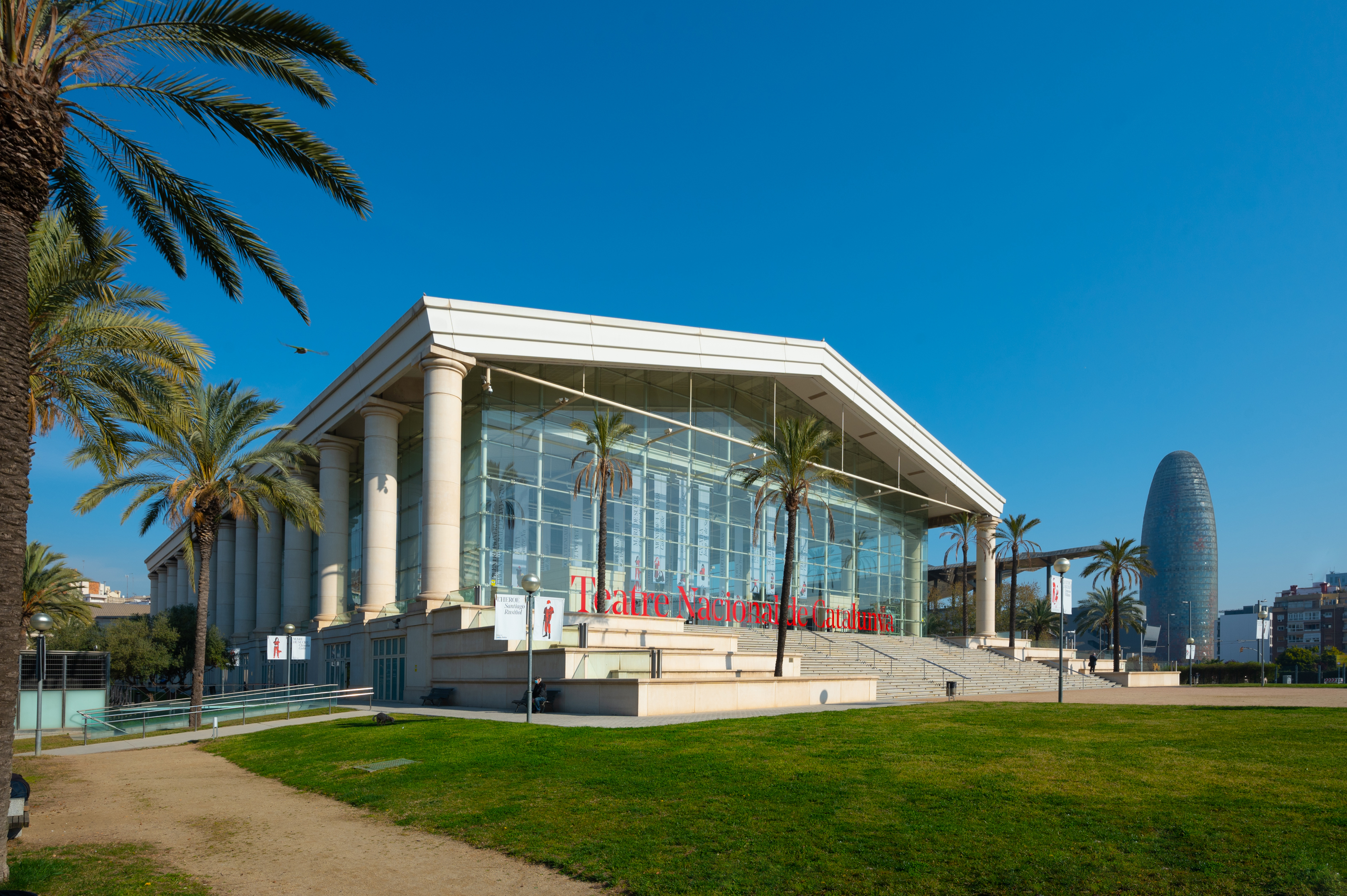
- Teatre Nacional de Catalunya
- Interactive map of Teatre Nacional de Catalunya
- Address: Plaça de les Arts, 1 Barcelona; Spain

Construction
- Opened: November 12, 1996: first play at Sala Tallers. September 11, 1997: first play at Sala Gran
- Architect: Ricardo Bofill

Website
- www.tnc.cat

Teatre Nacional de Catalunya (TNC; Catalan pronunciation: [teˈatɾə nəsi.uˈnal də kətəˈluɲə]; National Theatre of Catalonia) is a public theatre located in Barcelona, Catalonia, Spain. It was created by the Culture Department of the Catalan Government to normalize and enhance the theatre and dance in Catalan language and their creators.

The building is located at Plaça de les Arts, in front of L'Auditori and near Plaça de les Glòries Catalanes and is one of the emblematic cultural facilities of Barcelona.

== History ==
The political circumstances that lead the creation of the TNC were the consequence of more than two decades of cultural creation after Catalonia had been granted a Statute of Autonomy –that allowed arts and social communication in Catalan. It was designed as an ancient Greek temple that resembled some other late 19th-century National Theatres by the prestigious Catalan postmodern architect Ricardo Bofill i Leví. Its construction took place from November 8, 1991, to 1996. The result was polemic, and some detractors described it as a parody or as a mausoleum. The facility shows three theatre halls suitable for performances: Sala Gran (in English: Big Hall), with a Greek theatre stands and capacity for 866 seats; Sala Petita (in English: Small Hall), with mobile stands and capacity between 266 and 500 people; and Sala Tallers (in English: Workshop Hall), with mobile stands.

Teatre Nacional de Catalunya has become an example of the political role of the National Theatre concept in the late 20th century. Its perspective is bound to the cultural cohesion and the Nation state idea: the institution aims to establish an idea of identity bound based on historical, linguistical, and dramatic symbols and traditions. This way, it allows to create a vector of self-organization and the expression of "national images".

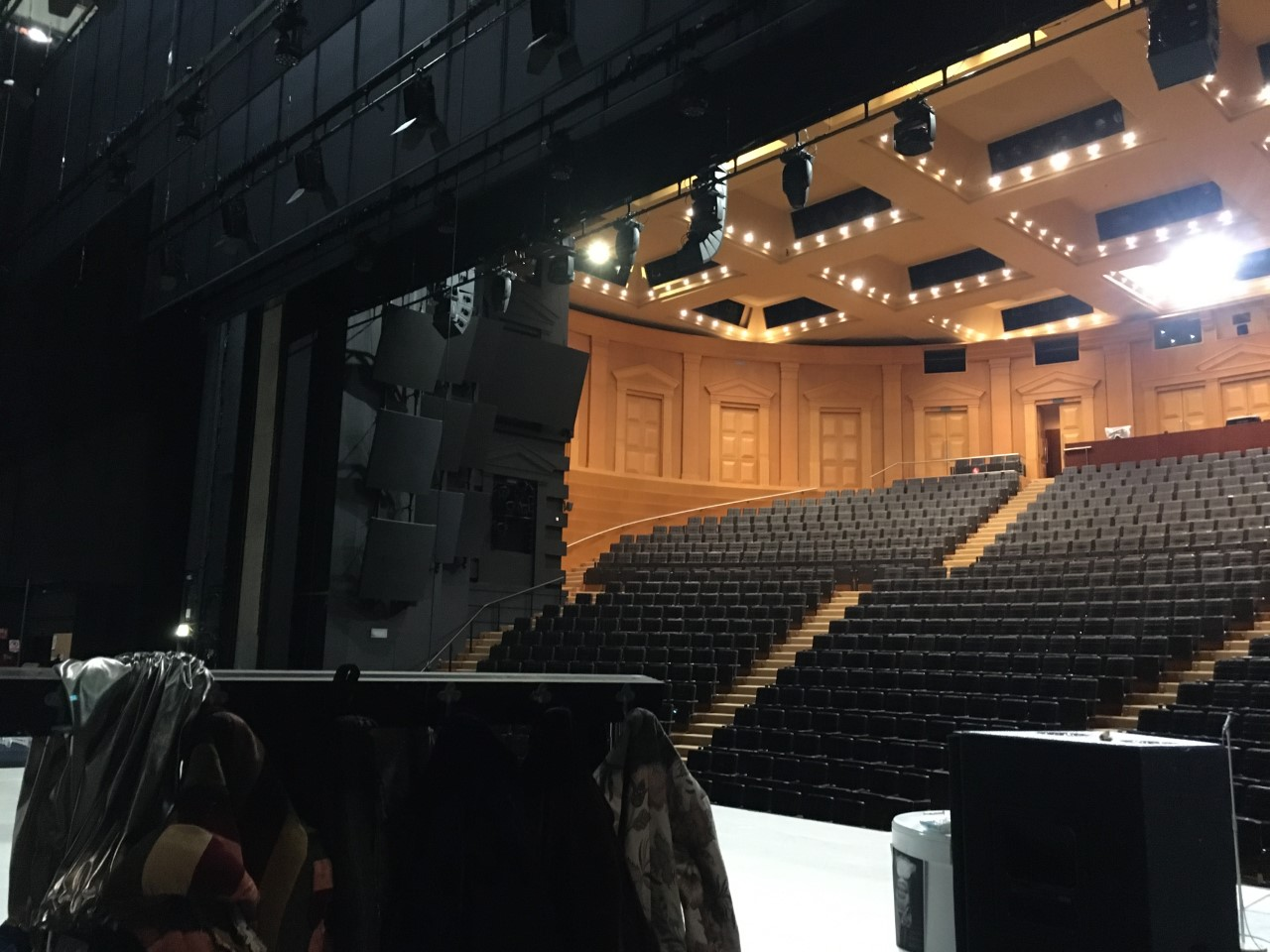
Sala Gran (Big Hall) of Teatre Nacional de Catalunya (2021)

On November 12, 1996, it opened with Àngels a Amèrica (Angels in America) by Tony Kushner, and directed by Josep Maria Flotats. The choice of both the artistic director and the first playwright were also polemic, as Flotats had been criticised for ignoring Catalan plays. He was dismissed shortly after mostly due to the high cost of his productions and strong clashes with the Catalan Government since he started in his position. Since then, the theatre has been managed by several directors by combining Catalan classical plays with an international repertoire to become a cultural hotspot of the city and the country. Since summer 2021, the current artistic director of TNC is the dramaturge Carme Portaceli i Roig (València, 1957).

== Educational and new-generation initiatives ==
Along its history, the TNC has backed several projects to enhance the educational scope of the theatre, the context of its plays, and to boost new talents of the field. One of the most significant was the "T6" Project, which gathered young creators to meet and follow up mutually their artworks (including a scholarship that granted their playwrights to be played in the building) from 2002 to 2013. It was cancelled due to the Great Recession and has been highlighted as one of the key initiatives to renovate both generational and conceptual theatre in Catalonia during the 21st century.

Another successful project by TNC is "Llegir el teatre" (English: Read the Theatre). This program was launched in 2012 with the collaboration of the Public Libraries Service of the Government of Catalonia to spread the Catalan dramatic literature to new public via Book discussion clubs. This way, the playwrights were discussed to improve the theatre knowledge among the population, boost the appearance of new authors and plays, and increase the available books on this topic in the public libraries of the country. Until the 2021–2022 season, the project has read 61 plays through 26 training sessions, 64,000 readers and 119 Catalan public libraries.

== Artistic Directors of TNC ==
Name	Period	Picture	Source
Josep Maria Flotats i Picas	November 1996 – June 1998		
Domènech Reixach i Felipe	July 1998 – June 2006		
Sergi Belbel i Coslado	July 2006 – June 2013		
Xavier Albertí i Gallart	July 2013 – July 2021		
Carme Portaceli i Roig	July 2021 –		

== Bibliography ==
- Carlson, Marvin (2008). "National Theatres: Then and Now". In S.E. Wilmer (ed.). National theatres in a changing Europe. Basingstoke [England]: Palgrave Macmillan. ISBN 978-0-230-58291-0. OCLC 314773441.
- Feldman, Sharon G. (2009). In the eye of the storm : contemporary theater in Barcelona. Lewisburg: Bucknell University Press. ISBN 978-0-8387-5851-9. OCLC 698589281.
- George, David J. (2010). Sergi Belbel and Catalan theatre : text, performance and identity. Woodbridge, Suffolk: Tamesis. ISBN 978-1-84615-919-0. OCLC 778454553.
- Orazi, Veronica (2021). "Teatre Lliure, en procés: Theatre Meets Politics". In Antonio Cortijo Ocaña, Vicent Martines (ed.). History of Catalonia and its implications for contemporary nationalism and cultural conflict. Hershey, PA. ISBN 978-1-7998-6616-9. OCLC 1158508377.
