= Ana Díez =

Spanish director and screenwriter

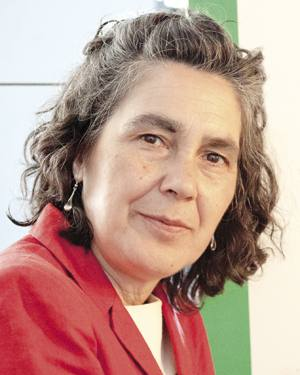
Ana Diez, 2012

Ana Diez (born 1957) is a Spanish director and screenwriter, who was born in Tudela, Navarre. She spent time in Mexico, where she received her degree in cinema. One of her best-known films is Ander eta Yul, which was in the Basque language. She has been referred to as "the first woman director in the New Basque Cinema." She received the Goya Award for Best New Director for the film.
