= Justino, a Senior Citizen Killer =

- Theatrical release poster
- Spanish: Justino, un asesino de la tercera edad
- Directed by: La Cuadrilla
- Screenplay by: La Cuadrilla
- Starring: Saturnino García; Carlos Lucas; Carmen Segarra; Francisco Maestre; Concha Salinas; Carlos de Gabriel
- Cinematography: Flavio Mtnez. Labiano
- Edited by: Cristina Otero
- Music by: José Carlos Mac
- Production company: José María Lara PC
- Release dates: October 1994 (Sitges); 3 February 1995 (Spain)
- Country: Spain
- Language: Spanish

Justino, a Senior Citizen Killer (Spanish: Justino, un asesino de la tercera edad) is a 1994 Spanish black comedy film written and directed by La Cuadrilla (Luis Guridi and Santiago Aguilar). It stars Saturnino García.

== Plot ==
With the company of his friend "Sansoncito", who dreams about moving to old age paradise Benidorm, retired puntillero (Note: Member of a bullfighting crew dedicated to delivering the fatal blow to the animal with a stab to the neck.) Justino begins killing people standing in his way.

== Cast ==
- Saturnino García as Justino
- Juanjo Puigcorbé as el empresario ('the businessman')
- Carlos Lucas as Darío, "Sansoncito"
- Francisco Maestre as Renco
- Carmen Segarra as Reme
- Concha Salinas as Angelines
- Marta Fernandez Muro as Cova
- Alicia Hermida as Doña Pura
- Carlos de Gabriel as Carlos
- Félix Rotaeta as Compro Todo
- Ramón Barea as inspector Arsenio
- Alicia Sánchez as gobernanta

== Release ==
The film premiered at the 1994 Sitges Film Festival. It was released theatrically on 3 February 1995.

== Reception ==
Peter Besas of Variety assessed that "grainy and amateurish" qualities notwithstanding, the film has nonetheless "such a mixture of endearing humanity, humor and outrageous situations that it beguiles the viewer".

== Accolades ==
Year	Award	Category	Nominee(s)	Result	Ref.
1994	27th Sitges Film Festival	Best Film		Won	
1994	27th Sitges Film Festival	Best Actor	Saturnino García	Won	
1995	9th Goya Awards	Best New Director	La Cuadrilla (Aguilar & Guridi)	Won	
1995	9th Goya Awards	Best New Actor	Saturnino García	Won	

== See also ==
- List of Spanish films of 1995

== Sources ==
- Benavent, Francisco María (2000). Cine español de los 90. Diccionario de películas, directores y temático. Bilbao: Ediciones Mensajero. ISBN 84-271-2326-4.
