= Francisco Casavella =

Spanish novelist

- Born: Francisco Garcia Hortelano; 15 October 1963; Barcelona
- Died: 17 December 2008 (aged 45)
- Occupation: Novelist

Francisco Casavella was the pseudonym of Francisco Garcia Hortelano (15 October 1963 – 17 December 2008), a Spanish novelist.

He never used his real name to sign his works, as his surname coincides with that of another novelist, Juan García Hortelano.

== Biography ==
Francisco Casavella began his literary career upon obtaining at 27 the Tigre Juan Award to the best unpublished novel with his work El triunfo [The triumph] (1990), which was followed by Quédate [Stay] (1993), Un enano español se suicida en Las Vegas [A Spanish dwarf commits suicide in Las Vegas] (1997), the juvenile novel El secreto de las fiestas [The secret of the parties] (1997) and the trilogy El día del Watusi [The day of the Watusi], formed by "Los juegos feroces" [The ferocious games] (2002), "Viento y joyas" [Wind and jewels] (2002) and "El idioma imposible" [The impossible language] (2003), a portrait of Barcelona in the last quarter of the 20th century, from the chabolismo of the late Franco years to the Olympic Games of 1992 and the financial scandals of the 1990s. In 2008 he won the Premio Nadal with the last novel he ever published, Lo que sé de los vampiros [What I know of vampires], a historical tragicomedy situated in 18th century Europe. It has been translated into different languages.

He was the screenwriter of the movie Antártida [Antarctica] (1995), the film director Manuel Huerga's first work, and of the TV movie for the Catalan TV Dues dones [Two women] (1998, Enric Folch). He also wrote for the print media, e.g. for the newspaper El País, and for Co&Co' magazine.

He died on 17 December 2008, at age 45, from a heart attack, only eleven months after winning the Premio Nadal.

== Works ==
- The Triumph (1990 Versal), Tigre Juan Prize novel
- Stay (1993, Ediciones B)
- A Spanish dwarf commits suicide in Las Vegas (1997, Anagram)
- The secret of festivals (1997, Anaya)
- The Day of the Watusi. The fierce games (2002, Mondadori)
- The Day of the Watusi. Wind and jewels (2002, Mondadori)
- The Day of the Watusi. The impossible language (2003, Mondadori)
- What I know of the Vampires (2008, Target), Nadal Prize 2008
