= Boca a boca =

1995 film

Mouth to Mouth
- Theatrical release poster
- Spanish: Boca a boca
- Directed by: Manuel Gómez Pereira
- Written by: Joaquín Oristrell; Juan Luis Iborra; Manuel Gómez Pereira; Naomi Wise
- Starring: Javier Bardem; Aitana Sánchez-Gijón; Josep Maria Flotats; María Barranco
- Production companies: Sogetel; BocaBoca Producciones; Star Line TV Productions
- Release dates: October 1995 (Sitges); 10 November 1995 (Spain)
- Country: Spain
- Language: Spanish

Mouth to Mouth (Spanish: Boca a boca) is a 1995 Spanish sex comedy film directed by Manuel Gómez Pereira. The cast, led by Javier Bardem, also features Aitana Sánchez-Gijón and Josep Maria Flotats.

== Plot ==
The aspiring actor Víctor Ventura has a night job at a phone sex agency. He gets to know a woman who wants more than just talking. The seductive Amanda drags him into an assassination plot and his dream of an acting career moves further into the distance.

== Cast ==
- Javier Bardem as Víctor Ventura.
- Aitana Sánchez-Gijón as Amanda.
- Josep Maria Flotats as Ricardo / "Bill".
- María Barranco as Ángela.
- Amparo Baró as Margot.
- Candela Peña as Tanya.
- Fernando Guillén Cuervo as Raúl.
- Myriam Mézières as Shelia Crawford.
- Jordi Bosch as matón.
- Sam Mckenzie as Oswaldo.
- Tres Hanley as Debra Reynolds.
- Emilio Gutiérrez Caba as David.
- Kiti Manver as Luci.

== Production ==
Mouth to Mouth was directed by Manuel Gómez Pereira, who also wrote the screenplay together with Joaquín Oristrell, Naomi Wise and Juan Luis Iborra. The production companies were Sogetel, BocaBoca Producciones and Star Line TV Productions. Shot in Madrid from 19 December 1994 to 8 February 1995, shooting locations included the Palacio de Gaviria.

== Release ==
The film was presented at the 28th Sitges Film Festival in October 1995, screened as part of the 'Premiére' selection dedicated to non-fantasy films. Distributed by Sony Pictures, the film was theatrically released in Spain in 1995. The film grossed 374.2 million ₧ in 1995. It was released by Miramax in the United States.

== Awards and nominations ==
Year	Award	Category	Nominee(s)	Result	Ref.
1996	10th Goya Awards	Best Film		Nominated	
1996	10th Goya Awards	Best Director	Manuel Gómez Pereira	Nominated	
1996	10th Goya Awards	Best Original Screenplay	Joaquín Oristrell, Juan Luis Iborra, Manuel Gómez Pereira, Naomi Wise	Nominated	
1996	10th Goya Awards	Best Actor	Javier Bardem	Won	
1996	10th Goya Awards	Best Supporting Actor	Fernando Guillén Cuervo	Nominated	
1996	10th Goya Awards	Best Production Supervision	Josean Gómez	Nominated	
1996	10th Goya Awards	Best Editing	Guillermo Represa	Nominated	
1996	10th Goya Awards	Best Sound	Brian Saunders, Carlos Faruolo, James Muñoz	Nominated	
1996	51st CEC Medals	Best Actor	Javier Bardem	Won	
1998	13th Independent Spirit Awards	Best International Film		Nominated	

== See also ==
- List of Spanish films of 1995
