= Nobody Will Speak of Us When We're Dead =

Nadie hablará de nosotras cuando hayamos muerto
- Directed by: Agustín Díaz Yanes
- Written by: Agustín Díaz Yanes; Alejandro Pose
- Produced by: Edmundo Gil
- Starring: Victoria Abril; Pilar Bardem; Federico Luppi; Bruno Bichir; Demián Bichir
- Cinematography: Paco Femenia
- Music by: Bernardo Bonezzi
- Release dates: 1995 (Spain); 6 March 1996 (France)
- Running time: 104 minutes
- Country: Spain
- Language: Spanish

Nadie hablará de nosotras cuando hayamos muerto (English: Nobody Will Speak of Us When We're Dead) is an awarded 1995 Spanish noir drama film written and directed by Agustín Díaz Yanes.

== Cast ==
- Gloria Duque – Victoria Abril
- Doña Julia – Pilar Bardem
- Eduardo – Federico Luppi
- Doña Amelia – Ana Ofelia Murguía
- Oswaldo – Daniel Giménez Cacho
- Juan – Ángel Alcázar
- Ramiro – Saturnino García
- María Luisa – Marta Aura
- Evaristo – Guillermo Gil

== Awards ==
- 8 Goya Awards: including Best Film, Best Actress (Victoria Abril), Best Supporting Actress (Pilar Bardem), Best New Director and Best Editing.
- San Sebastian Film Festival: Best Actress (Victoria Abril) and Special Prize of the Jury
- 2 Fotogramas de Plata
- 3 Premio Ondas
