= Juan Luis Iborra =

- Born: Juan Luis Pérez Iborra; 25 March 1959 (age 66); L'Alfàs del Pi, Spain
- Occupations: Screenwriter; film director; television director

Juan Luis Pérez Iborra (born 25 March 1959), simply known as Juan Luis Iborra, is a Spanish screenwriter and director.

== Biography ==
Juan Luis Pérez Iborra was born in L'Alfàs del Pi on 25 March 1959. He moved to Madrid, where he started studying drama in 1979.

After making his acting debut on stage in 1982, he developed instead a career as a screenwriter (both in film and television), including Televisión Española's show ¡Hola Raffaella!.

In 1995, he won the Goya Award for Best Original Screenplay for All Men Are the Same. One year later, he earned a nomination for Best Original Screenplay for Mouth to Mouth.

Iborra debuted as director with the featured films Amor de hombre (1997) and Km. 0 (2000), both co-helmed alongside Yolanda García Serrano, making his solo debut with Tiempos de azúcar (2000). They were followed by Valentín, and Crazy. He also worked as director of the popular series Aquí no hay quien viva and La que se avecina.
