= Manuel Huerga =

Spanish film director

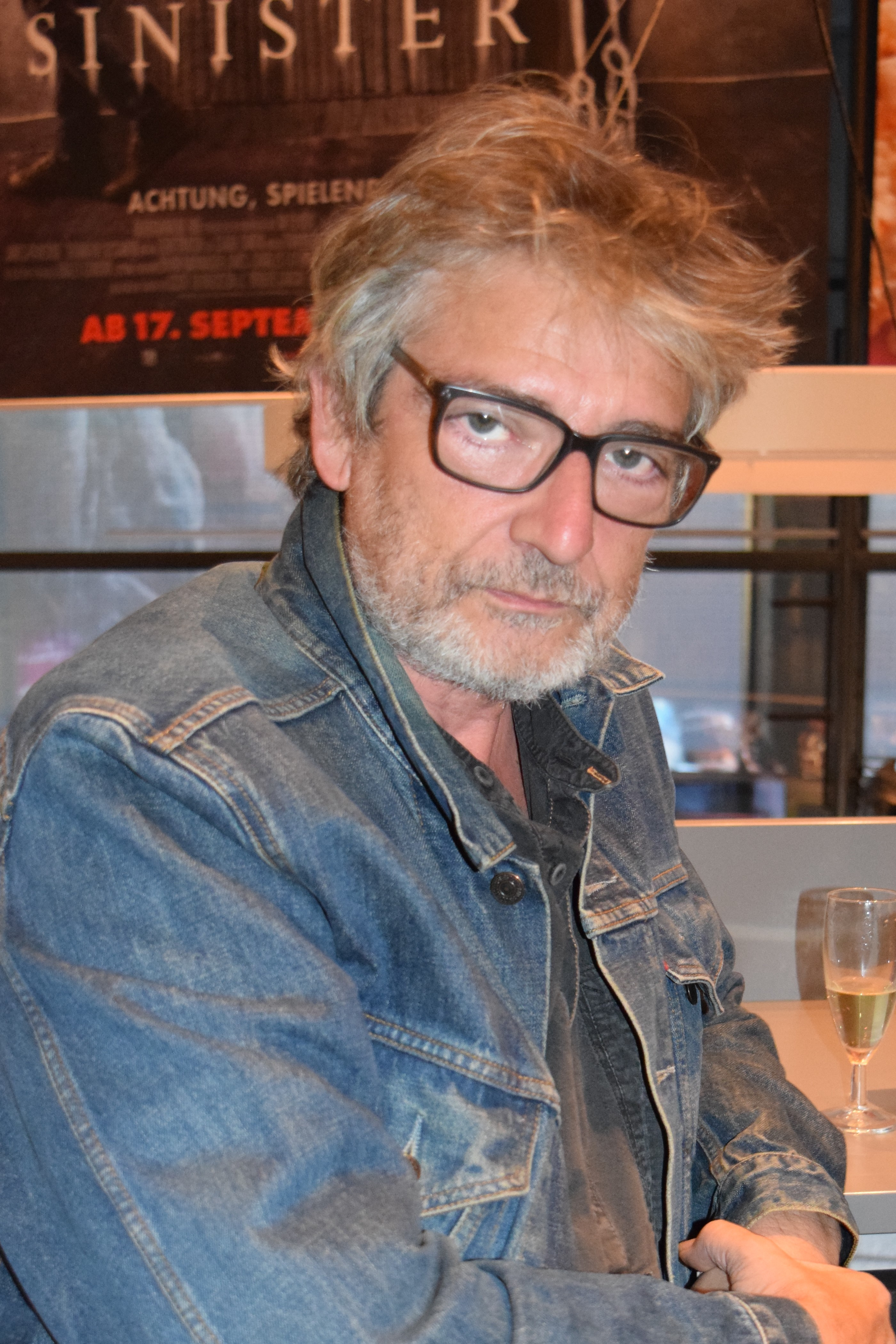
- Manuel Huerga in Berlin at the presentation of the film Barcelona, the Rose of Fire (2015).
- Born: 20 October 1957 (age 68); Barcelona, Spain
- Occupations: Film director, screenwriter
- Years active: 1986–present

Manuel Huerga (born 20 October 1957) is a Spanish film director and screenwriter. His film Salvador (Puig Antich) was screened in the Un Certain Regard section at the 2006 Cannes Film Festival.

== Selected filmography ==
=== Film ===
- Brutal Ardour (1978; short film)
- Gaudí (1989)
- Antártida (1995)
- Salvador (Puig Antich) (2006)

=== Television ===
- Arsenal (1985-1987)
- Operación Malaya (2011)
- 14 d'abril. Macià contra Companys (2011)
- Barcelona, la rosa de foc (2014)
- All or Nothing: Manchester City (2016; 8 episodes)
- Nit i dia (2016-2017; 15 episodes)
