= Manuel Gómez Pereira =

Spanish screenwriter and film director (born 1958)

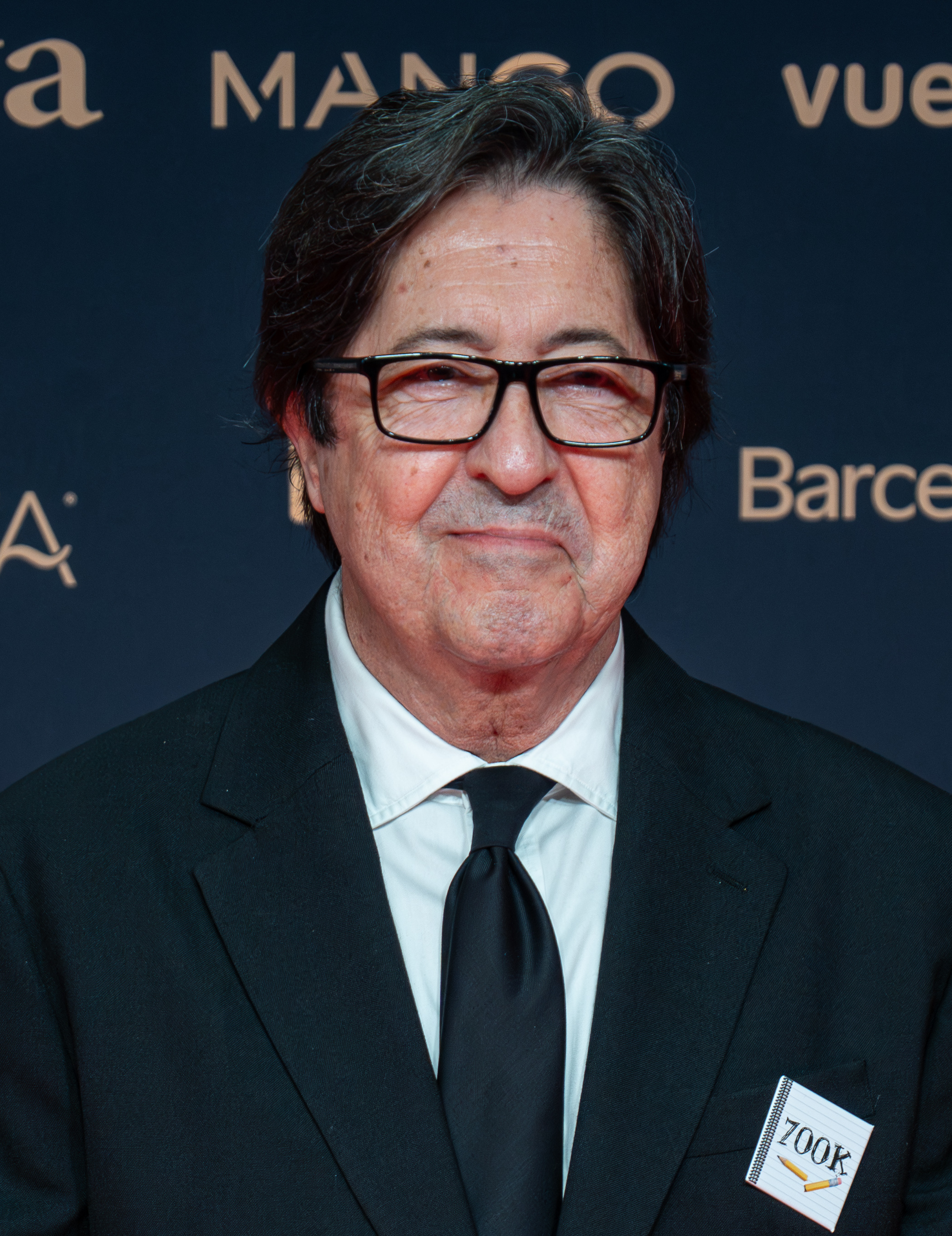
- Gómez Pereira in 2026
- Born: 8 December 1958 (age 67); Madrid, Spain
- Occupations: Film director, screenwriter
- Years active: 1992 – present

Manuel Gómez Pereira (born 8 December 1958 in Madrid) is a Spanish screenwriter and film director of comedies. His 1999 film Between Your Legs was entered into the 49th Berlin International Film Festival.

He is the nephew of the film director Luis Sanz, his brother.

== Filmography as director ==
- 1992: Salsa rosa
- 1993: Why Do They Call It Love When They Mean Sex?
- 1994: All Men Are the Same (1994 film)
- 1995: Boca a boca (Mouth to Mouth)
- 1997: Love Can Seriously Damage Your Health (El amor perjudica seriamente la salud)
- 1999: Between Your Legs (Entre las piernas)
- 2001: Off Key (Desafinado)
- 2004: ¡Hay motivo!
- 2004: Cosas que hacen que la vida valga la pena
- 2006: Queens (Reinas)
- 2009: The Hanged Man
- 2014: La ignorancia de la sangre
- 2016: All Men Are the Same, a Dominican remake of the above
- 2025: Un funeral de locos
