= List of Spanish films of 1993 =

A list of Spanish-produced and co-produced feature films released in Spain in 1993.

== Films ==
Release		Title (Domestic title)	Cast & Crew	Ref.
J A N U A R Y	8	The Greek Labyrinth (El laberinto griego)	Director: Rafael Alcázar Cast: Omero Antonutti, Aitana Sánchez-Gijón, Eusebio Poncela	
J A N U A R Y	29	Tierno verano de lujurias y azoteas	Director: Jaime Chávarri Cast: Gabino Diego, Marisa Paredes, Imanol Arias	
F E B R U A R Y	5	Mutant Action (Acción mutante)	Director: Álex de la Iglesia Cast: Antonio Resines, Álex Angulo	
F E B R U A R Y	12	Why Do They Call It Love When They Mean Sex? (¿Por qué lo llaman amor cuando quieren decir sexo?)	Director: Manuel Gomez Pereira Cast: Verónica Forqué, Jorge Sanz, Rosa María Sardá, Fernando Guillén, Elisa Matilla	
A P R I L	2	The Bilingual Lover (El amante bilingüe)	Director: Vicente Aranda Cast: Ornella Muti, Imanol Arias, Loles León, Javier Bardem	
A P R I L	21	The Red Squirrel (La ardilla roja)	Director: Julio Medem Cast: Emma Suárez, Nancho Novo, Karra Elejalde, Carmelo Gómez, María Barranco	
A P R I L	23	Huidos	Director: Sancho Gracia Cast: Sancho Gracia, Fernando Valverde, Uxía Blanco, Sara Mora	
A P R I L	30	Rosa Rosae	Director: Fernando Colomo Cast: Ana Belén, María Barranco, Juanjo Puigcorbé	
M A Y	5	The Bird of Happiness (El pájaro de la felicidad)	Director: Pilar Miró Cast: Mercedes Sampietro, Aitana Sánchez-Gijón, José Sacristán	
M A Y	14	Semos peligrosos (uséase Makinavaja 2)	Director: Carlos Suárez Cast: Andrés Pajares, Pedro Reyes, Jesús Bonilla	
A U G U S T	27	Tocando fondo	Director: José Luis Cuerda Cast: Antonio Resines, Jorge Sanz, Icíar Bollaín	
S E P T E M B E R	3	Intruder (Intruso)	Director: Vicente Aranda Cast: Victoria Abril, Imanol Arias, Antonio Valero	
S E P T E M B E R	3	La Lola se va a los puertos	Director: Josefina Molina Cast: Rocío Jurado, Francisco Rabal, Beatriz Santana, José Sancho, Jesús Cisneros	
S E P T E M B E R	10	Shadows in a Conflict (Sombras en una batalla)	Director: Mario Camus Cast: Carmen Maura, Joaquim de Almeida, Fernando Valverde	
S E P T E M B E R	24	Golden Balls (Huevos de oro)	Director: Bigas Luna Cast: Javier Bardem, Maria de Medeiros, Maribel Verdú	
O C T O B E R	1	Madregilda	Director: Francisco Regueiro Cast: Juan Echanove, José Sacristán	
O C T O B E R	1	¡Dispara!	Director: Carlos Saura Cast: Antonio Banderas, Francesca Neri	
O C T O B E R	29	Kika	Director: Pedro Almodóvar Cast: Verónica Forqué, Peter Coyote, Victoria Abril, Àlex Casanovas, Rossy de Palma	
N O V E M B E R	5	The Dead Mother (La madre muerta)	Director: Juanma Bajo Ulloa Cast: Karra Elejalde, Ana Álvarez, Lio, Silvia Marsó	
N O V E M B E R	19	My Soul Brother (Mi hermano del alma)	Director: Mariano Barroso Cast: Juanjo Puigcorbé, Carlos Hipólito, Lydia Bosch, Juan Echanove	
D E C E M B E R	22	Everyone Off to Jail (Todos a la cárcel)	Director: Luis García Berlanga Cast: José Sazatornil, Amparo Soler Leal, Manuel Alexandre, José Luis López Vázquez, Agustín González, José Sacristán, Marta Fernández Muro, Antonio Resines, Guillermo Montesinos	

== Box office ==
The five highest-grossing Spanish films in 1993, by in-year domestic box office gross revenue, are as follows:

Highest-grossing films of 1993
Rank	Title	Admissions	Domestic gross (₧)
1	Belle Époque	1,347,301	625,963,230
2	Kika	864,013	434,968,708
3	Why Do They Call It Love When They Mean Sex? (¿Por qué lo llaman amor cuando quieren decir sexo?)	693,121	323,943,768
4	Golden Balls (Huevos de oro)	419,198	209,739,128
5	Mutant Action (Acción mutante)	353,281	160,377,575
6	Semos peligrosos (uséase Makinavaja 2)	287,234	119,896,238
7	The Bilingual Lover (El amante bilingüe)	247,167	113,377,848
8	Madregilda	219,932	112,534,953
9	Intruder (Intruso)	189,539	94,247,874
10	The Red Squirrel (La ardilla roja)	161,521	73,482,487

== See also ==
- 8th Goya Awards
- 1993 in film
