= 8th Goya Awards =

- Date: 21 January 1994
- Site: Palacio de Congresos de Madrid
- Hosted by: Rosa Maria Sardà

Highlights
- Best Film: Everyone Off to Jail
- Best Actor: Juan Echanove; Madregilda
- Best Actress: Verónica Forqué; Kika
- Most awards: Banderas, the Tyrant (6)
- Most nominations: Kika (8)

Television coverage
- Network: TVE

The 8th Goya Awards were presented in Madrid on 21 January 1994.

Todos a la cárcel (Everyone Off to Jail) won the award for best film.

== Winners and nominees ==
=== Major award nominees ===
Best Film: Everyone Off to Jail; Intruder; Shadows in a Conflict	Best Director: Luis García Berlanga – Everyone Off to Jail; Vicente Aranda – Intruder; Juanma Bajo Ulloa – The Dead Mother
Best Actor: Juan Echanove – Madregilda; Imanol Arias – Intruder; Javier Bardem – Golden Balls	Best Actress: Verónica Forqué – Kika; Carmen Maura – Shadows in a Conflict; Emma Suárez – The Red Squirrel
Best Supporting Actor: Fernando Valverde – Shadows in a Conflict; Juan Echanove – My Soul Brother; Javier Gurruchaga – Banderas, the Tyrant	Best Supporting Actress: Rosa Maria Sardà – Why Do They Call It Love When They Mean Sex?; María Barranco – The Red Squirrel; Rossy de Palma – Kika
Best Original Screenplay: Shadows in a Conflict – Mario Camus; Everyone Off to Jail – Jorge García Berlanga and Luis García Berlanga; Madregilda – Ángel Fernández Santos and Francisco Regueiro	Best Adapted Screenplay: Banderas, the Tyrant – Rafael Azcona and José Luis García Sánchez; The Bilingual Lover – Vicente Aranda; La febre d'or – Guillem-Jordi Graells and Gonzalo Herralde
Best Spanish Language Foreign Film: Gatica, el mono • Argentina; Johnny 100 Pesos • Chile; Knocks at My Door • Venezuela	Best European Film: Three Colours: Blue • Poland/France; The Crying Game • UK; Peter's Friends • UK
Best New Director: Mariano Barroso – My Soul Brother; José Ángel Bohollo – Ciénaga; Arantxa Lazkano – Urte ilunak	Best Original Score: The Red Squirrel – Alberto Iglesias; Why Do They Call It Love When They Mean Sex? – Manolo Tena; Intruder – José Nieto

=== Other award nominees ===
Best Cinematography: The Bird of Happiness – José Luis Alcaine; The Dead Mother – Javier Aguirresarobe; Madregilda – José Luis López-Linares	Best Editing: Banderas, the Tyrant – Pablo González del Amo; Intruder – Teresa Font; The Dead Mother – Pablo Blanco
Best Art Direction: Banderas, the Tyrant – Félix Murcia; Kika – Alain Bainée and Javier Fernández; Madregilda – Luis Vallés	Best Production Supervision: Banderas, the Tyrant – José L. García Arrojo; Everyone Off to Jail – Ricardo García Arrojo; Kika – Esther García
Best Sound: Everyone Off to Jail – Gilles Ortion, Daniel Goldstein, Manuel Cora, Alberto Herena and Enrique Quintana; The Bird of Happiness – Carlos Faruolo; Kika – Jean-Paul Mugel and Graham V. Hartstone	Best Special Effects: The Dead Mother – Hipólito Cantero; Kika – Olivier Gleyze, Yves Domenjoud and Jean-Baptiste Bonetto; Madregilda – Reyes Abades
Best Costume Design: Banderas, the Tyrant – Andrea D'Odorico; Kika – José María De Cossío; Madregilda – Gumersindo Andrés	Best Makeup and Hairstyles: Banderas, the Tyrant – Solange Aumaitre and Magdalena Álvarez; Kika – Gregorio Ros and Jesús Moncusi; Madregilda – Odile Fourquin and María Del Mar Paradela
Best Fictional Short Film: Perturbado; Ivorsi; Maldita suerte; Quien mal anda mal acaba	Best Documentary Short Film: Verano en la universidad; Cita con Alberto; El largo viaje de Rústico; Walter Peralta

== Honorary Goya ==
- Tony Leblanc
