= There Is Always a Right Way =

- Theatrical release poster
- Spanish: Siempre hay un camino a la derecha
- Directed by: José Luis García Sánchez
- Written by: Rafael Azcona
- Story by: Rafael Azcona; José Luis García Sánchez
- Starring: Juan Luis Galiardo; Juan Echanove; Rosa Mª Sardá; Neus Asensi; Javier Gurruchaga; Adriana Davidova; Manuel Alexandre; Tina Sainz; Fernando Vivanco
- Cinematography: Hans Burmann
- Edited by: Pablo del G. Amo
- Music by: Chano Domínguez
- Production companies: Alma Ata Films; Galiardo Producciones; Gaila; Función Única; Sogepaq
- Distributed by: Alta Films
- Release date: 29 August 1997
- Country: Spain
- Language: Spanish

There Is Always a Right Way (Spanish: Siempre hay un camino a la derecha, lit. ''There is always a path to the right'') is a 1997 Spanish satirical comedy film directed by José Luis García Sánchez and written by Rafael Azcona based on a story by García Sánchez and Azcona. It stars Juan Luis Galiardo and Juan Echanove.

== Plot ==
A satire of 1990s trash television, the plot tracks the plight of good-natured pícaros Juan and Pepe. After returning to Spain and about to commit suicide, they are invited by dishonest television host Lanzagorta to a sensationalist show that turns their misfortune into a docudrama.

== Cast ==
- Juan Luis Galiardo as Juan
- Juan Echanove as Pepe
- Rosa María Sardá as Angélica
- Neus Asensi as Carmela
- Javier Gurruchaga as Lanzagorta
- Adriana Davidova as Milena
- Manuel Alexandre as Candelario
- Tina Sainz as Luchi
- Fernando Vivanco as comisario
- Queta Claver as Titi
- Sara Mora as Sonsoles
- Jaroslaw Bielski as Bergachovic

== Production ==
The films is an Alma Ata Films, Galiardo Producciones, Gaila, Función Única and Sogepaq production. García Sánchez saw his film as "more like a sainete than an esperpento".

== Release ==
Distributed by Alta Films, the film was released theatrically in Spain on 29 August 1997.

== Reception ==
Ángel Fernández-Santos of El País declared the film a "fast-paced, dismembered, amusing and furious creation about the moral misery of today's Spain".

Jonathan Holland of Variety assessed the film to be an "enjoyably offbeat but hit-and-miss attack on the multiple failings of contemporary Spanish society as experienced by two good-natured rogues", highlighting their "exuberant (and psychologically implausible)" relationship as the film's strongest element.

== See also ==
- List of Spanish films of 1997
