= Esther García =

Spanish film producer and production supervisor

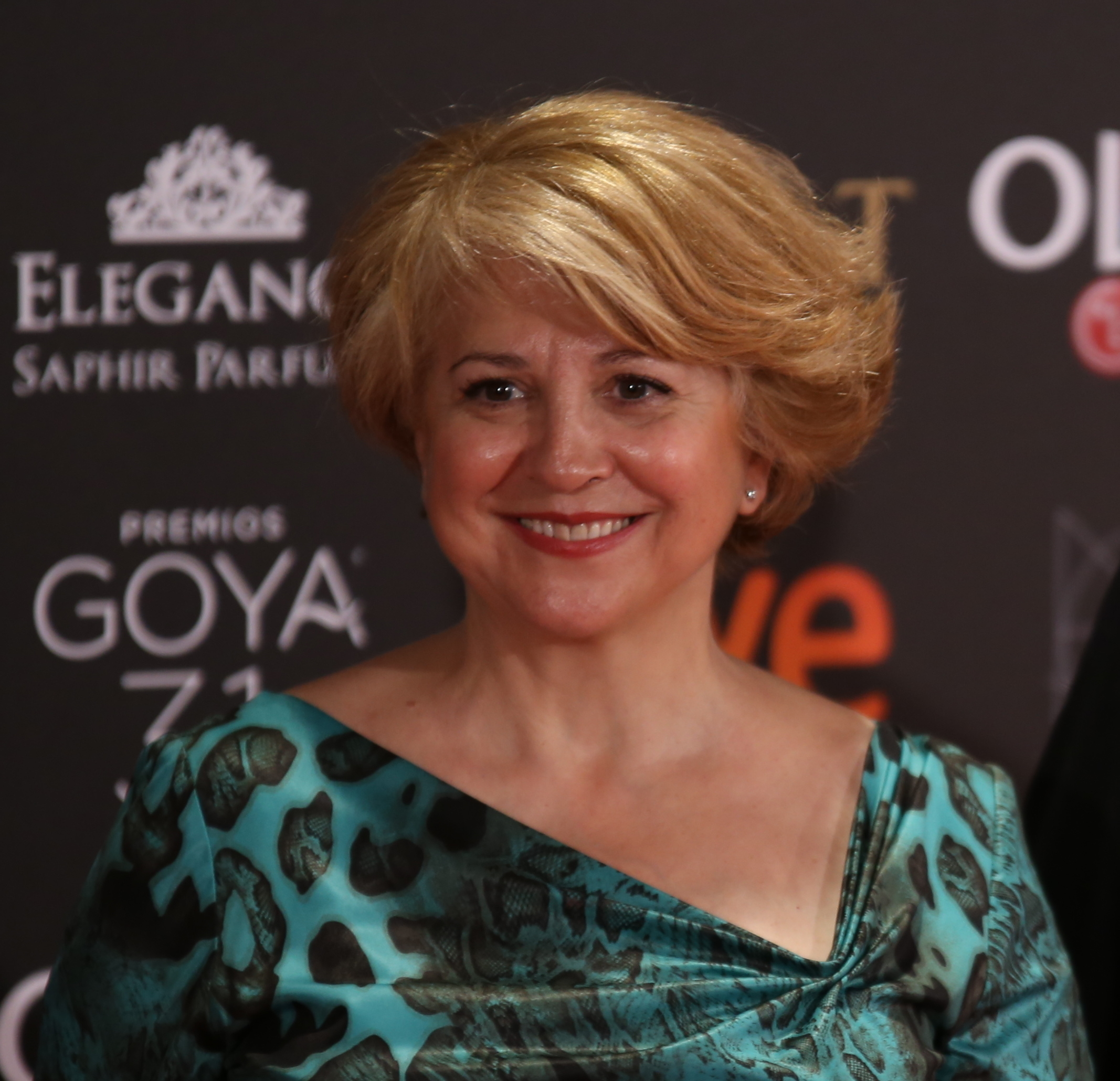
- García in 2017
- Born: Esther García Rodríguez; 1956 (age 68–69); Cedillo de la Torre, Spain
- Occupation(s): Production supervisor, producer

Esther García Rodríguez (born 1956) is a Spanish film producer and production supervisor.

== Life and career ==
Esther García Rodríguez was born in 1956 in Cedillo de la Torre. Her career in audiovisual production began with her participation in the crew of film Pim, pam, pum... ¡fuego! and television series Curro Jiménez. Involved in the production of Pedro Almodóvar's filmography, she has also served as manager of El Deseo.

In 2018, she was awarded with Spain's National Prize of Cinematography.

== Accolades ==
Year	Award	Category	Work	Result	Ref.
1989	3rd Goya Awards	Best Production Supervision	Women on the Verge of a Nervous Breakdown	Nominated	
1991	5th Goya Awards	Best Production Supervision	Tie Me Up! Tie Me Down!	Nominated	
1993	7th Goya Awards	Best Production Supervision	Acción mutante	Won	
1994	8th Goya Awards	Best Production Supervision	Kika	Nominated	
2000	14th Goya Awards	Best Production Supervision	All About My Mother	Won	
2005	19th Goya Awards	Best Production Supervision	Bad Education	Nominated	
2006	20th Goya Awards	Best Production Supervision	The Secret Life of Words	Won	
2015	29th Goya Awards	Best Production Supervision	Wild Tales	Nominated	
