= Goya Award for Best Production Supervision =

Annual award by the Spanish Film Academy

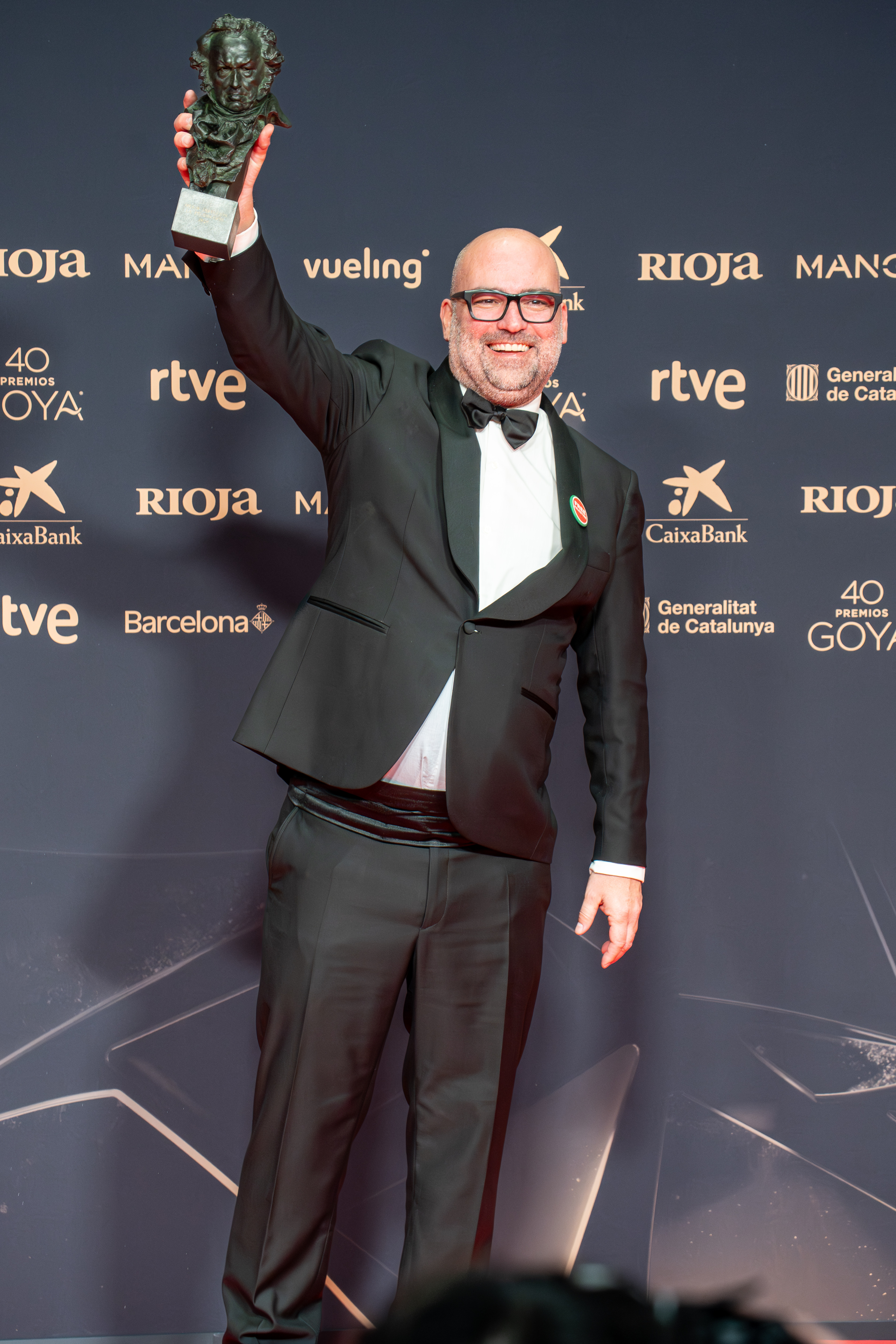
- The 2026 recipient: Oriol Maymó
- Native name: Premio Goya a la mejor dirección de producción
- Awarded for: Best production supervision in a Spanish film of the year
- Country: Spain
- Presented by: Academy of Cinematographic Arts and Sciences of Spain (AACCE)
- First award: 2nd Goya Awards (1987)
- Most recent winner: Oriol Maymó; Sirāt (2025)
- Website: Official website

The Goya Award for Best Production Supervision (Spanish: Premio Goya a la mejor dirección de producción) is one of the Goya Awards presented annually by the Academy of Cinematographic Arts and Sciences of Spain (AACCE) since the second edition of the awards in 1987. Marisol Carnicero was the first winner of the award for her work in Turnip Top (1987).

José Luis Escolar holds the record of most wins in this category with four followed by Esther García, Emiliano Otegui and Andrés Santana with three wins each.

== Winners and nominees ==
=== 1980s ===
Year	English title	Original title	Recipient(s)
1987 (2nd)	Turnip Top	Cara de acelga	Marisol Carnicero
1987 (2nd)	Course Completed	Asignatura aprobada	Mario Morales
1987 (2nd)	Policía		Daniel Vega
1988 (3rd)	Rowing with the Wind	Remando al viento	José G. Jacoste
1988 (3rd)	Berlín Blues		Emiliano Otegui
1988 (3rd)	El Dorado		Víctor Albarrán
1988 (3rd)	Women on the Verge of a Nervous Breakdown	Mujeres al borde de un ataque de nervios	Esther García
1988 (3rd)	Pasodoble		Marisol Carnicero
1989 (4th)	Twisted Obsession	El sueño del mono loco	José López Rodero
1989 (4th)	Bajarse al moro		Andrés Santana
1989 (4th)	The Sea and the Weather	El mar y el tiempo	Andrés Santana
1989 (4th)	Moon Child	El niño de la luna	Adolfo Cora, Chihab Gharbi, Francisco Villar, Jaime Fernández-Cid and Selma Beccar
1989 (4th)	Esquilache		Marisol Carnicero

=== 1990s ===
Year	English title	Original title	Recipient(s)
1990 (5th)	¡Ay Carmela!		Víctor Albarrán
1990 (5th)	Tie Me Up! Tie Me Down!	¡Átame!	Esther García
1990 (5th)	Letters from Alou	Las cartas de Alou	Primitivo Álvaro
1991 (6th)	The Dumbfounded King	El rey pasmado	Andrés Santana
1991 (6th)	Don Juan in Hell	Don Juan en los infiernos	Alejandro Vázquez
1991 (6th)	Prince of Shadows	Beltenebros	José Luis García Arrojo
1992 (7th)	Acción mutante		Esther García
1992 (7th)	Belle Époque		Cristina Huete
1992 (7th)	The Fencing Master	El maestro de esgrima	Antonio Guillén
1993 (8th)	Banderas, the Tyrant	Tirano Banderas	José Luis García Arrojo
1993 (8th)	Kika		Esther García
1993 (8th)	Everyone Off to Jail	Todos a la cárcel	Ricardo García Arroyo
1994 (9th)	The Turkish Passion	La pasión turca	José Luis Escolar
1994 (9th)	Running Out of Time	Días contados	Andrés Santana
1994 (9th)	El detective y la muerte		José Luis García Arrojo
1995 (10th)	Nobody Will Speak of Us When We're Dead	Nadie hablará de nosotras cuando hayamos muerto	José Luis Escolar
1995 (10th)	Mouth to Mouth	Boca a boca	Josean Gómez
1995 (10th)	The Day of the Beast	El día de la bestia	Carmen Martínez
1996 (11th)	Tesis		Emiliano Otegui
1996 (11th)	Beyond the Garden	Más allá del jardín	Carmen Martínez
1996 (11th)	Libertarias		Luis Gutiérrez
1997 (12th)	Perdita Durango		José Luis Escolar
1997 (12th)	The Chambermaid on the Titanic	La camarera del Titanic	Roberto Manni
1997 (12th)	Comanche Territory	Territorio comanche	Yousaf Bokhari
1998 (13th)	The Girl of Your Dreams	La niña de tus ojos	Angélica Huete
1998 (13th)	Open Your Eyes	Abre los ojos	Emiliano Otegui
1998 (13th)	A Time for Defiance	La hora de los valientes	Mikel Nieto
1998 (13th)	The Grandfather	El abuelo	Luis María Delgado and Valentín Panero
1999 (14th)	All About My Mother	Todo sobre mi madre	Esther García
1999 (14th)	Goya in Bordeaux	Goya en Burdeos	Carmen Martínez
1999 (14th)	Butterfly's Tongue	La lengua de las mariposas	Emiliano Otegui
1999 (14th)	Solas		Eduardo Santana

=== 2000s ===
Year	English title	Original title	Recipient(s)
2000 (15th)	You're the One	You're the One (una historia de entonces)	Luis María Delgado
2000 (15th)	Heart of the Warrior	El corazón del guerrero	Tino Pont
2000 (15th)	Common Wealth	La comunidad	Juanma Pagazaurtundua
2000 (15th)	Lázaro de Tormes		Carmen Martínez
2001 (16th)	The Others	Los otros	Emiliano Otegui and Miguel Ángel González
2001 (16th)	Intacto		José Luis Jiménez
2001 (16th)	Mad Love	Juana la Loca	Carlos Bernases
2001 (16th)	Don't Tempt Me	Sin noticias de Dios	Angélica Huete
2002 (17th)	Box 507	La caja 507	Fernando Victoria de Lecea
2002 (17th)	The Shanghai Spell	El embrujo de Shanghai	Luis Guitiérrez
2002 (17th)	Carol's Journey	El viaje de Carol	Andrés Santana
2002 (17th)	Guerreros		Javier Arsuaga
2003 (18th)	Mortadelo & Filemon: The Big Adventure	La gran aventura de Mortadelo y Filemón	Luis Manso and Marina Ortiz
2003 (18th)	Al sur de Granada		Pilar Robla
2003 (18th)	Carmen		Ana Vila
2003 (18th)	The Galíndez File	El misterio Galíndez	Josean Gómez
2004 (19th)	The Sea Inside	Mar adentro	Emiliano Otegui
2004 (19th)	Bad Education	La mala educación	Esther García
2004 (19th)	Crimen Ferpecto		Juanma Pagazaurtundua
2004 (19th)	The Wolf	El Lobo	Miguel Torrente and Cristina Zumárraga
2005 (20th)	The Secret Life of Words	La vida secreta de las palabras	Esther García
2005 (20th)	Camarón: When Flamenco Became Legend	Camarón	Tino Pont
2005 (20th)	Habana Blues		Eduardo Santana and Ernesto Chao
2005 (20th)	Obaba		Puy Oria
2006 (21st)	Alatriste		Cristina Zumárraga
2006 (21st)	The Borgia	Los borgia	Eduardo Santana, Guido Simonetta and Ricardo García Arrojo
2006 (21st)	Salvador (Puig Antich)		Bernat Elías
2006 (21st)	Volver		Toni Novella
2007 (22nd)	The Orphanage	El orfanato	Sandra Hermida
2007 (22nd)	13 Roses	Las 13 Rosas	Martín Cabañas
2007 (22nd)	Sunday Light	Luz de domingo	Juan Carmona and Salvador Gómez Cuenca
2007 (22nd)	Oviedo Express		Teresa Cepeda
2008 (23rd)	The Oxford Murders	Los crímenes de Oxford	Rosa Romero
2008 (23rd)	Che: The Argentine	Che: el argentino	Cristina Zumárraga
2008 (23rd)	The Blind Sunflowers	Los girasoles ciegos	Emiliano Otegui
2008 (23rd)	Just Walking	Sólo quiero caminar	Mario Pedraza and Rafael Cuervo
2009 (24th)	Agora	Ágora	José Luis Escolar
2009 (24th)	Cell 211	Celda 211	Alicia Tellería
2009 (24th)	Che: Guerrilla	Che: Guerrilla	Cristina Zumárraga
2009 (24th)	The Dancer and the Thief	El baile de la victoria	Eduardo Castro

=== 2010s ===
Year	English title	Original title	Recipient(s)
2010 (25th)	Even the Rain	También la lluvia	Cristina Zumárraga
2010 (25th)	The Last Circus	Balada triste de trompeta	Yousaf Bokhari
2010 (25th)	Black Bread	Pa negre (Pan negro)	Edmon Roch and Toni Novella
2010 (25th)	Lope		Aleix Castellón
2011 (26th)	Blackthorn		Andrés Santana
2011 (26th)	EVA		Toni Carrizosa
2011 (26th)	The Skin I Live In	La piel que habito	Toni Novella
2011 (26th)	No Rest for the Wicked	No habrá paz para los malvados	Paloma Molina
2012 (27th)	The Impossible	Lo imposible	Sandra Hermida
2012 (27th)	Blancanieves		Josep Amorós
2012 (27th)	The Artist and the Model	El artista y la modelo	Angélica Huete
2012 (27th)	Unit 7	Grupo 7	Manuela Ocón
2013 (28th)	Witching & Bitching	Las brujas de Zugarramurdi	Carlos Bernases
2013 (28th)	Three Many Weddings	3 bodas de más	Marta Sánchez de Miguel
2013 (28th)	The Last Days	Los últimos días	Josep Amorós
2013 (28th)	Zip & Zap and the Marble Gang	Zipi y Zape y el club de la canica	Koldo Zuazua
2014 (29th)	El Niño		Edmon Roch and Toni Novella
2014 (29th)	Marshland	La isla mínima	Manuela Ocón
2014 (29th)	Mortadelo and Filemon: Mission Implausible	Mortadelo y Filemón contra Jimmy el Cachondo	Luis Fernández Lago and Julián Larrauri
2014 (29th)	Wild Tales	Relatos salvajes	Esther García
2015 (30th)	Nobody Wants the Night	Nadie quiere la noche	Andrés Santana and Marta Miró
2015 (30th)	Retribution	El desconocido	Carla Pérez de Albéniz
2015 (30th)	Palm Trees in the Snow	Palmeras en la nieve	Toni Novella
2015 (30th)	A Perfect Day	Un día perfecto	Luis Fernández Lago
2016 (31st)	A Monster Calls	Un monstruo viene a verme	Sandra Hermida
2016 (31st)	1898, Our Last Men in the Philippines	1898, Los últimos de Filipinas	Carlos Bernases
2016 (31st)	Smoke & Mirrors	El hombre de las mil caras	Manuela Ocón
2016 (31st)	The Queen of Spain	La reina de España	Pilar Robla
2017 (32nd)	Giant	Handia	Ander Sistiaga
2017 (32nd)	Summer 1993	Estiu 1993	Carla Pérez de Albéniz
2017 (32nd)	The Bookshop	La librería	Álex Boyd and Jordi Berenguer
2017 (32nd)	Gold	Oro	Luís Fernández Lago
2018 (33rd)	The Man Who Killed Don Quixote	El hombre que mató a Don Quixote	Yousaf Bokhari
2018 (33rd)	The Photographer of Mauthausen	El fotógrafo de Mauthausen	Eduard Vallés and Hanga Kuruez
2018 (33rd)	Champeons	Campiones	Luis Fernández Lago
2018 (33rd)	The Realm	El reino	Iñaki Ros
2019 (34th)	While at War	Mientras dure la guerra	Carla Pérez de Albéniz
2019 (34th)	Pain and Glory	Dolor y gloria	Toni Novella
2019 (34th)	Out in the Open	Intemperie	Manolo Limón
2019 (34th)	The Endless Trench	La trinchera infinita	Ander Sistiaga

=== 2020s ===
Year	English title	Original title	Recipient(s)
2020 (35th)	Adú		Ana Parra and Luis Fernández Lago
2020 (35th)	Coven	Akelarre	Guadalupe Balaguer Trelles
2020 (35th)	Black Beach		Carmen Martínez Muñoz
2020 (35th)	It Snows in Benidorm	Nieve en Benidorm	Toni Novella
2021 (36th)	Mediterraneo: The Law of the Sea	Mediterráneo	Albert Espel and Kostas Seakianakis
2021 (36th)	Love Gets a Room	El amor en su lugar	Óscar Vigiola
2021 (36th)	The Good Boss	El buen patrón	Luis Gutiérrez
2021 (36th)	Maixabel		Guadalupe Balaguer Trelles
2022 (37th)	Prison 77	Modelo 77	Manuela Ocón
2022 (37th)	Alcarràs		Elisa Sirvent
2022 (37th)	The Beasts	As bestas	Carmen Sánchez de la Vega
2022 (37th)	Piggy	Cerdita	Sara García
2022 (37th)	Lullaby	Cinco lobitos	María José Díez
2023 (38th)	Society of the Snow	La sociedad de la nieve	Margarita Huguet
2023 (38th)	20,000 Species of Bees	20.000 especies de abejas	Pablo Vidal
2023 (38th)	Close Your Eyes	Cerrar los ojos	María José Díez
2023 (38th)	Jokes & Cigarettes	Saben aquell	Eduard Vallès
2023 (38th)	Valle de sombras		Leire Aurrekoetxea, Luis Gutiérrez
2024 (39th)	The 47	El 47	Carlos Apolinario
2024 (39th)	A House on Fire	Casa en flames	Laia Gómez
2024 (39th)	Undercover	La infiltrada	Axier Pérez Serrano
2024 (39th)	The Red Virgin	La virgen roja	Kati Martí Donoghue
2024 (39th)	Saturn Return	Segundo premio	Carlos Amoedo
2025 (40th)	Sirāt		Oriol Maymó
2025 (40th)	Sleepless City	Ciudad sin sueño	Antonello Novellino
2025 (40th)	The Captive	El cautivo	Sergio Díaz Bermejo
2025 (40th)	Sundays	Los domingos	Itziar García Zubiri
2025 (40th)	Los Tigres		Begoña Muñoz Corcuera
