= ¡Dispara! =

- Theatrical release poster
- Directed by: Carlos Saura
- Screenplay by: Carlos Saura; Enzo Monteleone
- Starring: Francesca Neri; Antonio Banderas; Lali Ramon; Walter Vidarte; Coque Malla; Achero Mañas
- Cinematography: Javier Aguirresarobe
- Edited by: Juan Ignacio San Mateo
- Music by: Alberto Iglesias
- Production companies: Arco Films; 5 Films; Metro Film
- Distributed by: U Films
- Release dates: 2 September 1993 (Venice); 1 October 1993 (Spain)
- Running time: 108 minutes
- Countries: Spain; Italy
- Language: Spanish

¡Dispara! (also known as Outrage!) is a 1993 drama film directed by Carlos Saura, starring Francesca Neri and Antonio Banderas. Taking place in Madrid, the story is a revenge tragedy. The film is a Spanish-Italian co-production.

== Plot ==
Marcos, a young reporter from a newspaper in Madrid, goes to a circus to write a Sunday supplement piece. As he is leaving, the next act is about to start. It involves a woman riding a horse and performing tricks; the presentation ends in shooting balloons from a horse while it is moving. Marcos is taken by the beauty of Anna, the equestrian sharpshooter, and returns to interview her. She invites him to dinner with the troupe. They dance, and then spend the night together. He falls in love with the beautiful horse-riding circus girl. An affair between them ensues; he considers following her around Europe and promises he would follow her to hell. Soon, Marco has to leave to cover a concert in Barcelona.

Fate intervenes when three young mechanics come to repair circus equipment and the owner gives them complimentary tickets for the show. The trio makes a racket as they watch Anna perform. After the show, they follow Anna to her trailer and brutally rape her. Although she is badly hurt, she decides to take matters into her own hands. Bruised, humiliated, and bleeding, she picks up her rifle and goes to hunt them down. She finds them easily at the mechanic shop where they work. She kills them all and leaves without being clearly identified. Anna, who is bleeding badly, has to visit a doctor who reveals to the authorities that she has been raped. The police initially have no clues about the culprit of the triple homicide, but after interviewing the doctor, they begin to suspect Anna.

Anna is stopped on a highway by two officers; she panics and kills them too, a decision that she regrets immediately. Marco who goes to Anna's trailer, finds traces of blood all over the place and he and the authorities go in search of Anna. She finds refuge in a country home where a couple and two small children live. Marcos is responsible for breaking the impasse between Anna and the police, but he arrives too late to help her; the police open fire on her, and she dies in his arms.

== Cast ==
- Francesca Neri as Ana / Judita
- Antonio Banderas as Marcos
- Eulalia Ramon as madre
- Coque Malla as Mario
- Concha Leza as doctora
- Chema Mazo as padre
- Walter Vidarte as Santana
- Achero Mañas

== Production ==
The scene in which Anna kills her rapists was shot before the scene in which she is raped. Francesca Neri, who plays Anna, would have preferred that the two scenes had been shot in temporal order. "I would have used stronger, more intense gestures. Rape, even just cinematic rape, is hard to bear. They take your body away, you don't like your skin anymore, you feel self-hatred," Neri said.

== Release ==
¡Dispara! premiered at the 50th Venice International Film Festival on 2 September 1993. It was released theatrically in Spain on 1 October 1993.

The film was released in the US on DVD on 30 January 1997 with the English title Outrage! The transfer and English dubbing is of poor quality and makes it look like Banderas is the main star of the film by prominently featuring him on the DVD cover. The DVD is of pan-and-scan quality and remastered in Dolby Digital Stereo and was distributed by Allumination.

== Reception ==
Ángel Fernández-Santos of El País considered that the film does not work, and so it "remains stagnant" throughout most of the runtime, with the exception of a few moments of violence, and finally "collapses in the final scene".

Deborah Young of Variety determined the film to be an "unmoving mix of modern psychology applied to a world of freaks and outsiders".

TV Guide remarked in its 3/5 star review "A well-acted revenge drama, [the film] seems rather anomalous to the career of acclaimed director Carlos Saura... It's not that his skills... aren't in evidence, but that they service a merely workmanlike screenplay... Even if we're not in Charles Bronson-DEATH WISH territory, the film lacks the quirkiness and depth of melodramas like 1988's THE ACCUSED or 1987's SHAME. OUTRAGE piques viewer involvement without ever suggesting that this well-crafted outcry is a project close to the director's heart."

== See also ==
- List of Spanish films of 1993
