= Un asunto privado =

1996 film

Un Asunto Privado
- Directed by: Imanol Arias
- Written by: José Ángel Esteban; Carlos Lopez
- Produced by: Eduardo Campoy
- Cinematography: Acácio de Almeida
- Edited by: Luis Manuel del Valle
- Music by: Mario de Benito
- Distributed by: Aleph Producciones S.A. Laurenfilm S.A.
- Release date: 1996
- Running time: 98 minutes
- Countries: Argentina; Spain; Portugal
- Language: Spanish

Un asunto privado is a Spanish drama film co-produced by Portuguese and Argentine producers. Filmed in Portugal, it was released in 1996. The film was directed by Imanol Arias and written by José Ángel Esteban.

== Synopsis ==
An artist hires a gigolo through her faithful servant and lover to bring to life a game of mirrors and representations.

== Cast ==
- Jorge Perugorría as Alejandro
- Antonio Valero as Bruno
- Pastora Vega as Klaudia
- Fabián Vena as Dario
- Patricia Vico as Clienta
