= My Soul Brother =

- Theatrical release poster
- Spanish: Mi hermano del alma
- Directed by: Mariano Barroso
- Screenplay by: Joaquín Oristrell; Mariano Barroso
- Starring: Juanjo Puigcorbé; Carlos Hipólito; Lydia Bosch; Juan Echanove
- Cinematography: Flavio Martínez Labiano
- Edited by: Miguel Ángel Santamaría
- Music by: Bingen Mendizábal
- Production companies: Fernando Colomo PC; Sogetel
- Distributed by: Warner Española
- Release date: 19 November 1993
- Country: Spain
- Language: Spanish

My Soul Brother (Spanish: Mi hermano del alma) is a 1993 Spanish drama film directed by Mariano Barroso from a screenplay by Joaquín Oristrell and Barroso which stars Juanjo Puigcorbé and Carlos Hipólito alongside Lydia Bosch and Juan Echanove. Barroso's directorial debut feature, the film earned Barroso the Goya Award for Best New Director.

== Plot ==
Sleazy Toni (a scoundrel diagnosed with leukemia) meets with brother Carlos (a successful insurance agent happily married to Julia, Toni's former partner) after 10 years upon a trip invitation from the latter.

== Cast ==
- Juanjo Puigcorbé as Toni
- Carlos Hipólito as Carlos
- Lydia Bosch as Julia
- Juan Echanove as Sebastián
- Chema Muñoz as Doctor
- Walter Vidarte as Alberto
- Jordi Mollá

== Production ==
The film was produced by Fernando Colomo alongside Sogetel. It boasted a modest budget of 121.6 million ₧.

== Release ==
Distributed by Warner Española, the film was released theatrically in Spain on 19 November 1993. The film screened in the Panorama section of the 44th Berlin International Film Festival (February 1994), and the 29th Karlovy Vary International Film Festival (July 1994).

== Reception ==
Ángel Fernández-Santos of El País deemed the film to be "excellent" despite "serious blunders" such as the musical score completely unrelated to the action and the overcrowding of twists in the denouement.

== Accolades ==
Year	Award	Category	Nominee(s)	Result	Ref.
1994	8th Goya Awards	Best New Director	Mariano Barroso	Won	
1994	8th Goya Awards	Best Supporting Actor	Juan Echanove	Nominated	
1994	29th Karlovy Vary International Film Festival	Crystal Globe		Won	

== See also ==
- List of Spanish films of 1993
