= Why Do They Call It Love When They Mean Sex? =

- Theatrical release poster
- Spanish: ¿Por qué lo llaman amor cuando quieren decir sexo?
- Directed by: Manuel Gómez Pereira
- Screenplay by: Joaquín Oristrell; Yolanda García Serrano; Juan Luis Iborra; Manuel Gómez Pereira
- Produced by: Carlos Orengo; César Benítez
- Starring: Verónica Forqué; Jorge Sanz; Rosa Mª Sardá; Fernando Guillén
- Cinematography: Hans Burmann
- Edited by: Guillermo Represa
- Music by: Manuel Tena
- Production companies: Audiovisuales Neblí; Cristal PC
- Distributed by: Columbia TriStar Films de España
- Release date: 12 February 1993
- Country: Spain
- Language: Spanish

Why Do They Call It Love When They Mean Sex? (Spanish: ¿Por qué lo llaman amor cuando quieren decir sexo?) is a 1993 Spanish comedy film directed by Manuel Gómez Pereira. It stars Verónica Forqué and Jorge Sanz.

== Cast ==
- Verónica Forqué as Gloria
- Jorge Sanz as Manu
- Rosa Maria Sardà as Sole
- Fernando Guillén as Enrique
- Fernando Valverde as Karim
- Elisa Matilla as Cristal
- Isabel Ordaz as Rubí
- Gracia Olayo and Soledad Olayo as Las Veneno

== Production ==
The film is an Audiovisuales Neblí and Cristal Producciones Cinematográficas production.

== Release ==
The film was released theatrically on 12 February 1993. It proved to be a box-office hit. As of 31 August 1993, it had grossed 313 million ₧.

== Critical reception ==
Writing for the Sun Sentinel, Candice Russell gave the film two stars, complaining that she did not find the film funny. She summarized: "Subterfuge and shame play big roles in the story about a money grab (believable) that turns into something more (unbelievable)."

== Accolades ==
Year	Award	Category	Nominee(s)	Result	Ref.
1994	8th Goya Awards	Best Supporting Actress	Rosa María Sardá	Won	
1994	8th Goya Awards	Best Original Score	Manolo Tena	Nominated	

== See also ==
- List of Spanish films of 1993
