= Rosa Rosae =

- Theatrical release poster
- Directed by: Fernando Colomo
- Written by: Fernando Colomo
- Starring: Ana Belén; María Barranco; Juanjo Puigcorbé; Chris de Oni; Rosa Novell; María Luisa Ponte
- Cinematography: Javier Salmones
- Edited by: Miguel A. Santamaría
- Music by: Mariano Díaz
- Production company: Fernando Colomo PC
- Distributed by: Warner Española
- Release date: 30 April 1993
- Country: Spain
- Language: Spanish

Rosa Rosae is a 1993 Spanish comedy-drama film written and directed by Fernando Colomo starring Ana Belén and María Barranco.

== Plot ==
Rosa Cordón, an unimaginative and parasitic fiction writer, re-acquaints with childhood friend Rosae, now part time Correos worker part time fortune teller, and otherwise the one who truly boasts creativity and imagination.

== Cast ==
- Ana Belén as Rosa Cordón
- María Barranco as Rosae
- Juanjo Puigcorbé as Teo-Doro
- Rosa Novell as Graciela
- Chris de Oni as Camilo
- María Luisa Ponte as anciana
- Ana María Ventura as Virtudes
- Isabel Serrano as Violeta Muñoz
- Cristina Calzón as Tina
- Javier Cámara as encargado

== Production ==
The film had a budget of 160 million ₧. Filming took five weeks. Shooting locations in Madrid included an apartment at the Plaza del Conde de Barajas, the Retiro Park, and a number of industrial warehouses at the cerro de la Plata.

== Release ==
The film was released theatrically in Spain on 30 April 1993.

== Reception ==
Ángel Fernández-Santos of El País assessed that Colomo delivers a "clean and genuine comedy", seriousness of the subject matter notwithstanding, with Barranco building a "fascinating" character.

== See also ==
- List of Spanish films of 1993
