= Manuela Vargas =

Manuela Vargas may refer to:

- Manuela Vargas (volleyball)
- Manuela Vargas (flamenco dancer)
