= Banderas, the Tyrant =

- Theatrical release poster
- Spanish: Tirano Banderas
- Directed by: José Luis García Sánchez
- Written by: José Luis García Sánchez; Rafael Azcona
- Based on: Tirano Banderas by Ramón María del Valle-Inclán
- Starring: Gian Maria Volonté; Ana Belén; Juan Diego; Fernando Guillén; Ignacio López Tarso; Javier Gurruchaga
- Cinematography: Fernando Arribas
- Edited by: Pablo del Amo
- Music by: Emilio Kauderer
- Production companies: Ion Films; Iberoamericana Films Producción; Atrium Productions; Promociones Audiovisuales Reunidas; Antena 3 Televisión; ICAIC; Cinematográfica del Prado
- Distributed by: United International Pictures
- Release dates: October 1993 (Seminci); 14 January 1994 (Spain)
- Countries: Spain; Cuba; Mexico
- Language: Spanish

Banderas, the Tyrant (Spanish: Tirano Banderas) is a 1993 drama film directed by José Luis García Sánchez. It is an adaptation of the 1926 novel Tirano Banderas by Ramón María del Valle-Inclán. It was produced by companies from Spain, Cuba and Mexico. It stars Gian Maria Volonté as the title character, also featuring Ana Belén, Juan Diego, Fernando Guillén, Ignacio López Tarso and Javier Gurruchaga.

== Plot ==
An adaptation of the (often presented as "unadaptable") novel Tirano Banderas, a standout work of the esperpento genre which underpins a criticism of abuses of power, the plot tracks the developments in the fictitious republic of Santa Fe de Tierra Firme, ruled by megalomaniac dictator Santos Banderas. The dictator has been noted to display an amalgamation of features from real dictators such as Rafael Leónidas Trujillo, Miguel Primo de Rivera or Juan Vicente Gómez.

== Cast ==
- Gian Maria Volonté as Santos Banderas.
- Ana Belén as Lupita la romántica.
- Juan Diego as Nacho Veguillas.
- Fernando Guillén as Quintín Pereda.
- Ignacio López Tarso as Domiciano de la Gándara.
- Javier Gurruchaga as Barón de Benicarlés.
- Patricio Contreras as Zacarías.
- Enrique San Francisco as Doctor Polaco.
- Gabriela Roel as Chinita.
- Manuel Bandera as Currito Mi Alma.
- Daisy Granados as Doña Rosita Pintado.
- Omar Valdés as Roque Cepeda.
- Gillian Vargas as Manolita.
- Patricio Wood as Filomeno Cuevas.
- María Galiana as Cucarachita la taracena.
- Samuel Claxton as Don Cruz.

== Production ==
Featuring an ambitious budget of 450 million ₧, the film was produced by Ion Films S. A. with the collaboration of Iberoamericana Films Producción S. A., Atrium Productions S. A., Promociones Audiovisuales Reunidas S. A., Antena 3 Televisión, ICAIC and Cinematográfica del Prado.

It was shot in 1993 in Mexico and Cuba (Havana and Trinidad).

== Release ==
The 50th Venice International Film Festival ruled out the film for its official competition. It screened as the only Spanish film in competition at the Valladolid International Film Festival (Seminci) in October 1993, where it met polarizing opinions. The film had a limited theatrical release in Galicia before the end of the year just so it could become eligible for the 8th Goya Awards, where it won the award for Best Adapted Screenplay and 5 additional awards in technical categories. It had a wide theatrical release in Spain on 14 January 1994.

== Awards and nominations ==
Year	Award	Category	Nominee(s)	Result	Ref.
1993	38th Valladolid Film Festival	Best Actor	Gian Maria Volonté	Won	
1994	8th Goya Awards	Best Adapted Screenplay	José Luis García Sánchez, Rafael Azcona	Won	
1994	8th Goya Awards	Best Supporting Actor	Javier Gurruchaga	Nominated	
1994	8th Goya Awards	Best Editing	Pablo del Amo	Won	
1994	8th Goya Awards	Best Art Direction	Félix Murcia	Won	
1994	8th Goya Awards	Best Production Supervision	José Luis García Arrojo	Won	
1994	8th Goya Awards	Best Costume Design	Andrea D'Odorico	Won	
1994	8th Goya Awards	Best Makeup and Hairstyles	Magdalena Álvarez, Solange Aumaitre	Won	

== See also ==
- List of Spanish films of 1994
