= The Flower of My Secret =

1995 film by Pedro Almodóvar

- Theatrical release poster
- Spanish: La flor de mi secreto
- Directed by: Pedro Almodóvar
- Written by: Pedro Almodóvar
- Produced by: Agustín Almodóvar; Esther García
- Starring: Marisa Paredes; Juan Echanove; Carme Elías; Rossy de Palma; Chus Lampreave; Joaquín Cortés; Manuela Vargas; Imanol Arias
- Cinematography: Affonso Beato
- Edited by: José Salcedo
- Music by: Alberto Iglesias
- Production companies: El Deseo; Ciby 2000
- Distributed by: Warner Española S.A. (Spain); Ciby 2000 (France)
- Release dates: 22 September 1995 (Spain); 27 September 1995 (France)
- Running time: 102 minutes
- Countries: Spain; France
- Language: Spanish
- Budget: $4.5 million
- Box office: $19 million

The Flower of My Secret (Spanish: La flor de mi secreto) is a 1995 drama film written and directed by Pedro Almodóvar. It was selected as the Spanish entry for the Best Foreign Language Film category at the 68th Academy Awards, but it was not selected as one of the final five nominees.

== Plot ==
Leocadia "Leo" Macías, missing her husband, Paco, a NATO military official who is in Brussels for reasons related to the Bosnian War, puts on a pair of boots he gave her, but they are too tight, and she cannot get them off. Unable to contact her housekeeper, she tracks down her best friend, Betty, who removes the boots. Betty later encourages Leo, who is a popular writer of romance novels under the nom de plume Amanda Gris, to contact Betty's friend Ángel, an editor at El País, and ask for a job writing about literature as a distraction. Ángel and Leo get along well, but when he asks her to review a new anthology of works by Amanda Gris (not knowing Leo is Gris), she refuses and leaves his office.

Ángel calls Leo to tell her he has read the pieces she gave him as examples of her writing and wants to publish one of her essays. Overjoyed, she wants to talk to Paco, but her call wakes him up and he accuses her of being drunk before she can relay her news.

Leo meets with her publishers to discuss her newest manuscript. They tell her it is unsuitably dark for an Amanda Gris novel and remind her that she is contractually obliged to write five romance novels each year with happy endings and without any social conscience, to be published pseudonymously, at Leo's request. The publishers threaten to sue her for breach of contract if she does not submit something in the required style, but she says she cannot write like that anymore. Frustrated, Leo writes an article belittling Amanda Gris and submits it to Ángel, who publishes it.

Paco comes home on what is supposed to be a 24-hour leave, but when he arrives, he is aloof and says he has to leave in two hours to go to Split. (Note: The part of the plot dealing with Paco's visit has similarities to Dorothy Parker's short story The Lovely Leave. When Leo first meets Ángel, she mentions that Parker is one of her favourite writers.) Leo becomes hysterical and Paco accuses her of being selfish, resulting in an argument, during which all of the problems in their relationship that they had agreed to forget about until the conflict in Bosnia was over resurface. As Paco is leaving, Leo asks if there is any chance at saving their marriage. He says there is not. Left alone, Leo takes half of a bottle of tranquilizers.

Leo is awoken by the sound of her mother leaving a message on her answering machine. She vomits up the pills and wanders into the streets, where she bumps into Ángel. When she wakes up in his apartment the next day, she learns that, in her compromised state, she told him that she is Amanda Gris. He agrees to keep her secret, so long as she does not try to kill herself again.

Once home, Leo finds Betty waiting for her. Betty tells Leo that she and Paco had been having an affair, but she ended it the previous night when Paco came to see her following his argument with Leo. Leo's mother calls again to complain about Leo's sister, Rosa, with whom she lives, and say she is moving back to their old village; Leo decides to go with her.

Leo spends some time resting and reconnecting with her roots. One day, one of her publishers calls to say how pleased the firm is with Leo's two newest Amanda Gris novels. Somewhat bemused, Leo calls Ángel to ask if he wrote and submitted the works on her behalf. He says he did and, later, agrees to write the rest of the books on Leo's contract.

Back in Madrid, after attending a dance performance created by Antonio, the son of her housekeeper, who danced in it with his mother, Leo returns to her apartment. Antonio stops by and tells her that he had taken advantage of her recent forgetfulness to steal some of her belongings to finance his show, among them a copy of her rejected novel, which is being made into a film. Leo, who had been worried she was losing her mind, like several of her female relatives before her, muses about the paradoxes of life and surprises Antonio by thanking him for giving meaning to her darkest months. (Note: Presumably by making them the source of something beautiful (i.e., his and his mother's dance).) Revitalized, she visits Ángel and, pretending it is New Year's Eve, they kiss.

== Cast ==
- Marisa Paredes as Leo Macías
- Juan Echanove as Ángel, an editor at El País
- Carme Elías as Betty, Leo's friend
- Rossy de Palma as Rosa, Leo's sister
- Chus Lampreave as Leo's mother
- Kiti Manver as Manuela, a nurse who works with Betty
- Joaquín Cortés as Antonio, Blanca's son
- Manuela Vargas as Blanca, Leo's housekeeper
- Imanol Arias as Paco, Leo's husband
- Gloria Muñoz as Alicia, Leo's publisher

== Production ==
Shooting locations included Almagro, in the province of Ciudad Real.

== Reception ==
=== Critical response ===
On the review aggregator website Rotten Tomatoes, the film holds an approval rating of 86% based on 29 reviews, with an average score of 7/10. The website's critics consensus reads, "The Flower of My Secret finds Almodóvar revisiting old themes in a new, more subdued key, yielding a slight but vivacious work that delivers the pleasure of a punchy novella." Metacritic, which uses a weighted average, assigned the film a score of 75 out of 100, based on 21 critics, indicating "generally favorable" reviews.

=== Accolades ===
Year	Award	Category	Nominee(s)	Result	Ref.
1996	10th Goya Awards	Best Director	Pedro Almodóvar	Nominated	
1996	10th Goya Awards	Best Actress	Marisa Paredes	Nominated	
1996	10th Goya Awards	Best Supporting Actress	Chus Lampreave	Nominated	
1996	10th Goya Awards	Best Supporting Actress	Rossy de Palma	Nominated	
1996	10th Goya Awards	Best Art Direction	Wolfgang Burmann	Nominated	
1996	10th Goya Awards	Best Makeup and Hairstyles	Antonio Panizza, Juan Pedro Hernández	Nominated	
1996	10th Goya Awards	Best Sound	Bernardo Menz, Graham V. Hartstone	Nominated	

Marisa Paredes won Best Actress at the Karlovy Vary International Film Festival, the ACE Awards, and the Sant Jordi Awards.

== Connections to later films by Pedro Almodóvar ==
The opening scene of The Flower of My Secret, in which, during a class taught by Betty, two young doctors role-play trying to persuade a woman who is acting like a grieving mother to donate the organs of her dead teenage son, was used as the starting point of All About My Mother (1999).

The novel in The Flower of My Secret that is rejected by Leo's publishers for being too dark and is then stolen and turned into a film has the same basic plot as that surrounding one of the daughters in Volver (2006): a young mother hides the corpse of her husband in a refrigerator after their daughter kills him because he tried to rape the girl.

In The Flower of My Secret, Leo tells Ángel that she earned money reading and writing letters for her illiterate neighbors as a child, a detail from Almodóvar's own life that also appears in Pain and Glory (2019). Also, the title of the essay by Leo that Ángel wants to publish in El País is "Pain and Life", which resembles "Pain and Glory".

== See also ==
- List of Spanish films of 1995
- List of submissions to the 68th Academy Awards for Best Foreign Language Film
- List of Spanish submissions for the Academy Award for Best Foreign Language Film
