= His Master's Voice (2001 film) =

- Theatrical release poster
- Spanish: La voz de su amo
- Directed by: Emilio Martínez Lázaro
- Written by: Emilio Martínez Lázaro
- Produced by: Andrés Vicente Gómez
- Starring: Eduard Fernández; Silvia Abascal; Joaquim de Almeida; Imanol Arias
- Cinematography: Javier Salmones
- Edited by: Iván Aledo
- Music by: Roque Baños
- Production company: Lolafilms
- Distributed by: Lolafilms Distribución
- Release date: 18 May 2001
- Country: Spain
- Language: Spanish

His Master's Voice (Spanish: La voz de su amo) is a 2001 Spanish crime thriller film directed and written by Emilio Martínez Lázaro, and starring Eduard Fernández, Silvia Abascal, Joaquim de Almeida, and Imanol Arias.

== Plot ==
The plot is set in 1980 in Bilbao. It follows Charli, a former ETA member and football player now working as chauffeur and bodyguard for shady businessman Oliveira and having a casual relationship with substance addict Katy. After an ETA lorry bomb attack in the wake of Oliveira's refusal to bow to the ETA extortion racket, Charli is tasked to protect Oliveira's daughter Marta, having sex and then starting to fall romantically for her.

== Cast ==
- Eduard Fernández as Charli
- Silvia Abascal as Marta
- Joaquim de Almeida as Oliveira
- Imanol Arias as Sacristán
- Ana Otero as Katy
- Joseba Apaolaza as Sáinz
- Alicia Agut as Madre de Charli
- Miguel del Arco as Iñaki
- Aitor Mazo as Benito
- Ion Gabella as Méndez
- Pepo Oliva as Sierra
- Manuel de Blas as Zurbano

== Production ==
A Lolafilms (Andrés Vicente Gómez) production, the film had the participation of TVE.

== Release ==
Distributed by Lolafilms Distribución, the film was theatrically released in Spain in May 2001.

== Reception ==
Jonathan Holland of Variety deemed the film to be "an intelligent, upbeat thriller that welds an invented storyline onto a factual background" and "manages to suggest the moral and political complexity of the subject without sensationalizing it".

Ángel Fernández-Santos of El País considered that the film is, above all, "an act of maturity and solvency, a highly professional work that has led to the elaboration of an admirably measured thriller".

== See also ==
- List of Spanish films of 2001
