= Madregilda =

Spanish film

- Theatrical release poster
- Directed by: Francisco Regueiro
- Screenplay by: Ángel Fernández-Santos; Francisco Regueiro
- Story by: Ángel Fernández-Santos; Francisco Regueiro
- Produced by: Gerardo Herrero; Adrian Lipp; Ulrich Felsberg
- Starring: Juan Echanove; José Sacristán; Barbara Auer; Kamel Chérif; Fernando Rey; Juan Luis Galiardo; Coque Malla
- Cinematography: José Luis López-Linares
- Edited by: Pedro del Rey
- Music by: Jürgen Knieper
- Production companies: Tornasol Films; Marea Films; Road Movies Dritte Produktionen; Gemini Films
- Distributed by: Alta Films
- Release dates: September 1993 (SSIFF); 1 October 1993 (Spain)
- Running time: 113 minutes
- Countries: Spain; Germany; France
- Language: Spanish

Madregilda is a 1993 film directed by Francisco Regueiro which stars Juan Echanove, José Sacristán, and Barbara Auer.

== Plot ==
Set in Madrid in the 1940s in an old neighbourhood tavern, on every first Friday of the month at nightfall moor Hauma organizes a unique and secret card game.

== Cast ==
- Juan Echanove as Francisco Franco
- José Sacristán as Longinos
- Barbara Auer as Ángeles / Madregilda
- Antonio Gamero as Huevines
- Juan Luis Galiardo as legionario
- Kamel Cherif as Hauma
- Fernando Rey as padre de Franco
- Lina Canalejas as abuela
- Coque Malla as soldado

== Production ==
The film is a Tornasol Films, Marea Films, Road Movies Dritte Produktionen and Gemini Films production.

== Release ==
The film screened at the 41st San Sebastián International Film Festival in September 1993. It was released theatrically in Spain on 1 October 1993.

== Reception ==
Casimiro Torreiro of El País wrote that the film "contains some of the best dialogues that have been written in Spanish cinema in recent years".

== Awards ==
Year	Award	Category	Nominee(s)	Result	Ref.
1993	41st San Sebastián International Film Festival	Silver Shell for Best Actor	Juan Echanove	Won	
1994	8th Goya Awards	Best Original Screenplay	Ángel Fernández Santos, Francisco Regueiro	Nominated	
1994	8th Goya Awards	Best Actor	Juan Echanove	Won	
1994	8th Goya Awards	Best Cinematography	José Luis López-Linares	Nominated	
1994	8th Goya Awards	Best Art Direction	Luis "Koldo" Vallés	Nominated	
1994	8th Goya Awards	Best Costume Design	Gumersindo Andrés	Nominated	
1994	8th Goya Awards	Best Special Effects	Reyes Abades	Nominated	
1994	8th Goya Awards	Best Makeup and Hairstyles	María del Mar Paradela, Odile Fourquin	Nominated	

== See also ==
- List of Spanish films of 1993
