= Alone Together (1990 film) =

- Theatrical release poster
- Spanish: A solas contigo
- Directed by: Eduardo Campoy
- Screenplay by: Agustín Díaz Yanes; Eduardo Calvo; Manolo Matji
- Starring: Victoria Abril; Imanol Arias; Juan Echanove
- Cinematography: Alfredo Mayo
- Edited by: Luis Manuel del Valle
- Music by: Mario de Benito
- Production companies: Lauren Films; Cartel; Flamenco Films
- Distributed by: Lauren Films
- Release dates: 5 September 1990 (Madrid); 7 September 1990 (Spain)
- Country: Spain
- Language: Spanish

Alone Together (Spanish: A solas contigo) is a 1990 Spanish spy thriller film directed by Eduardo Campoy which stars Victoria Abril and Imanol Arias alongside Juan Echanove.

== Plot ==
Set in Madrid in 1989, the plot follows Lieutenant Javier Artabe, a military officer attached to the Navy's Intelligence Service, investigating the killing of his partner Carlos Escorial (committed by Álvaro la Huerta) after they did some digging about the windfall revenues of Captain Valenzuela. The witness to the homicide is Gloria, a blind woman.

== Cast ==
- Victoria Abril as Gloria
- Imanol Arias as Javier Artabe
- Juan Echanove as Álvaro
- Nacho Martínez as Carlos Escorial
- Rafael Romero-Marchent
- Conrado San Martín as almirante Lahuerta
- Manuel Gil as Valenzuela
- María Luisa San José as Cecilia
- Emma Suárez as hermana de Gloria
- Esperanza Campuzano as Mónica

== Production ==
The screenplay was penned by Agustín Díaz Yanes, Eduardo Calvo with the collaboration of Manolo Matji. The films is a Lauren Films, Cartel, and Flamenco Films production. Shooting locations included Madrid. Luis Manuel del Valle was responsible for editing.

== Release ==
A pre-screening in Madrid was scheduled for 5 September 1990. Distributed by Laurenfilms, the film was theatrically released in Spain on 7 September 1990.

== Accolades ==
Year	Award	Category	Nominee(s)	Result	Ref.
1991	5th Goya Awards	Best Original Screenplay	Agustín Díaz Yanes, Eduardo Calvo, Manolo Matji	Nominated	
1991	5th Goya Awards	Best Actor	Imanol Arias	Nominated	
1991	5th Goya Awards	Best Supporting Actor	Juan Echanove	Nominated	

== See also ==
- List of Spanish films of 1990
