= All About My Mother =

1999 film by Pedro Almodóvar

- Theatrical release poster by Oscar Mariné
- Spanish: Todo sobre mi madre
- Directed by: Pedro Almodóvar
- Written by: Pedro Almodóvar
- Produced by: Agustín Almodóvar
- Starring: Cecilia Roth; Marisa Paredes; Penélope Cruz; Candela Peña; Antonia San Juan; Rosa Maria Sardà; Fernando Fernán Gómez; Fernando Guillén; Toni Cantó; Eloy Azorín; Carlos Lozano
- Cinematography: Affonso Beato
- Edited by: José Salcedo
- Music by: Alberto Iglesias
- Production companies: El Deseo; Renn Productions; France 2 Cinéma; Via Digital
- Distributed by: Warner Sogefilms (Spain); Pathé Distribution (United Kingdom, Ireland and France)
- Release dates: 16 April 1999 (Spain); 19 May 1999 (France)
- Running time: 104 minutes; 101 minutes (US cut)
- Countries: Spain; France
- Languages: Spanish; Catalan; English
- Budget: P600 million ($4,989,091)
- Box office: $68 million

All About My Mother (Spanish: Todo sobre mi madre) is a 1999 comedy-drama film written and directed by Pedro Almodóvar, and starring Cecilia Roth, Marisa Paredes, Candela Peña, Antonia San Juan, Penélope Cruz, Rosa Maria Sardà, and Fernando Fernán Gómez.

The plot originates in Almodóvar's earlier film The Flower of My Secret (1995), which shows student doctors being trained in how to persuade grieving relatives to allow organs to be used for transplant, focusing on the mother of a teenager killed in a road accident. All About My Mother deals with issues such as AIDS, gender identity, homosexuality, faith, and existentialism.

The film was a commercial and critical success both in Spain, where it received 14 Goya Award nominations, winning seven - including Best Film, Best Director and Best Actress for Roth; and internationally, winning the Academy Award for Best Foreign Language Film in addition to the Golden Globe for Best Foreign Language Film and two BAFTA Awards for Best Film Not in the English Language and Best Direction, as well as Best Director at the 52nd Cannes Film Festival.

A stage adaptation by Australian playwright Samuel Adamson premiered in London in 2007.

== Plot ==
Manuela is an Argentine nurse who supervises donor organ transplants at Ramón y Cajal Hospital in Madrid. She is also a single mother to Esteban, a teenager who aspires to become a writer.

On the night of Esteban's 17th birthday, he is hit and killed by a car while chasing after his favorite actress, Huma Rojo, for her autograph following a performance of A Streetcar Named Desire, where Huma portrays Blanche DuBois. Manuela allows her son's heart to be transplanted to a man in A Coruña. After tracking down the recipient, she resigns from her job and travels to Barcelona in search of Esteban's other mother, Lola, a transgender woman whom Manuela had kept secret from her son, just as she had never told Lola about the boy.

In Barcelona, Manuela reunites with her old friend Agrado, a warm and witty transgender sex worker. She also befriends Huma as well as her co-star and lover Nina Cruz, who is a heroin addict, and young HIV-positive nun Rosa, who works in a shelter for battered sex workers and is pregnant with Lola's child. Manuela's life becomes entwined with theirs as she cares for Rosa during her pregnancy, works as Huma's personal assistant, and takes the stage as an understudy for Nina during one of her drug abuse crises.

On her way to the hospital, Rosa asks the taxi to stop at a park where she spots her father's dog, Sapic, and then her own father, who has Alzheimer's. He does not recognize Rosa and asks for her age and height, but Sapic recognizes her. Rosa dies giving birth to a healthy boy; at her funeral, Manuela finally reunites with Lola. Lola (formerly known as Esteban) is dying from AIDS and talks about how she always wanted a son. Manuela tells her about their own son Esteban and his fatal accident. Manuela adopts Rosa's son, Esteban, caring for him at Rosa's parents' house. The father does not understand who Manuela is, and Rosa's mother introduces her as the new cook who is living there with her son.

Manuela introduces Esteban, Rosa's son, to Lola and gives her a picture of their own Esteban. Rosa's mother spots them from the street and confronts Manuela about letting strangers see the baby. Manuela tells her that Lola is Esteban's other parent, but Rosa's mother is appalled and blames Lola for causing Rosa's death, and fears that she will contract HIV from the baby. Deciding that she cannot live at Rosa's house any longer, Manuela flees back to Madrid with Esteban, and writes a letter to Huma and Agrado, apologizing once again for not saying goodbye like she did years before.

Two years later, Manuela returns to Barcelona with Esteban, who has remained healthy and AIDS-free. At an AIDS convention, she meets up with Huma and Agrado, who now run a stage show together, and tells them that she is returning to stay with Esteban's grandparents. When Manuela asks about Nina, Agrado reveals that Nina broke up with Huma, returned to her town, got married, and now has a son of her own.

== Cast ==
- Cecilia Roth as Manuela Echevarria
- Marisa Paredes as Huma Rojo
- Candela Peña as Nina Cruz
- Antonia San Juan as Agrado
- Penélope Cruz as Rosa
- Rosa Maria Sardà as Rosa's mother
- Fernando Fernán Gómez as Rosa's father
- Toni Cantó as Lola
- Eloy Azorín as Esteban Echevarria

== Production ==
Almodóvar dedicated his film "To all actresses who have played actresses. To all women who act. To men who act and become women. To all the people who want to be mothers. To my mother".

Almodóvar recreated the accident scene from John Cassavetes' Opening Night (1977) as the epicenter of the dramatic conflict.

The film was mainly shot on location in Barcelona.

The soundtrack includes "Gorrión" and "Coral para mi pequeño y lejano pueblo", written by Dino Saluzzi and performed by Saluzzi, Marc Johnson, and José Saluzzi, and "Tajabone", written and performed by Ismaël Lô.

The poster of the film was designed by Madrid illustrator Óscar Mariné. This poster was designed to epitomize the very image of beauty, simplicity, and femininity. The poster intentionally emphasizes red, white, and blue with black accent strokes and a pop of yellow.

== Release ==
The film premiered in Spain on 8 April 1999 and went into general theatrical release on 16 April. It was shown at the Cannes Film Festival, the Karlovy Vary Film Festival, the Auckland Film Festival, the Austin Film Festival, the Thessaloniki International Film Festival, and the New York Film Festival before going into limited release in the United States. It eventually grossed €9,962,047 in Spain ($12,595,016), $8,344,738 in the US, and $59,609,091 in foreign markets for a worldwide box office total of $67,957,990.

== Reception ==
=== Critical response ===
The film was well-received by critics. Janet Maslin of The New York Times called it Almodóvar's "best film by far", noting he "presents this womanly melodrama with an empathy to recall George Cukor's and an eye-dampening intensity to out-Sirk Douglas Sirk". She added, "It's the crossover moment in the career of a born four-hankie storyteller of ever-increasing stature. Look out, Hollywood, here he comes".

Roger Ebert of the Chicago Sun-Times observed, "You don't know where to position yourself while you're watching a film like All About My Mother, and that's part of the appeal: Do you take it seriously, like the characters do, or do you notice the bright colors and flashy art decoration, the cheerful homages to Tennessee Williams and All About Eve, and see it as a parody? . . . Almodóvar's earlier films sometimes seemed to be manipulating the characters as an exercise. Here the plot does handstands in its eagerness to use coincidence, surprise, and melodrama. But the characters have a weight and reality, as if Almodóvar has finally taken pity on them – has seen that although their plights may seem ludicrous, they are real enough to hurt".

Bob Graham of the San Francisco Chronicle said, "No one else makes movies like this Spanish director" and added, "In other hands, these characters might be candidates for confessions – and brawls – on The Jerry Springer Show, but here they are handled with utmost sympathy. None of these goings-on is presented as sordid or seedy. The presentation is as bright, glossy, and seductive as a fashion magazine . . . The tone of All About My Mother has the heart-on-the-sleeve emotions of soap opera, but it is completely sincere and by no means camp".

Wesley Morris of the San Francisco Examiner called the film "a romantically labyrinthine tribute that piles layers of inter-textual shout-outs to All About Eve, Tennessee Williams, Truman Capote, Federico García Lorca and Alfred Hitchcock, and beautifully assesses the nature of facades . . . Almodóvar imbues his Harlequin-novel-meets-Marvel-comic-book melodramas with something more than a wink and a smile, and it is beguiling. His expressionism and his screenwriting have always had fun together, but now there is a kind of faith and spirituality that sexcapades like Law of Desire and Kika only laughed at... it contains a host of superlative firsts: a handful of the only truly moving scenes he has filmed, the most gorgeous dialogue he has composed, his most dimensional performances of his most dimensional characters and perhaps his most dynamic photography and elaborate production design".

Jonathan Holland of Variety called the film "emotionally satisfying and brilliantly played" and commented, "The emotional tone is predominantly dark and confrontational . . . But thanks to a sweetly paced and genuinely witty script, pic doesn't become depressing as it focuses on the characters' stoic resilience and good humor".

On the review aggregator website Rotten Tomatoes, 98% of 97 critics' reviews are positive, with an average rating of 8.1/10. The website's consensus reads: "Almodovar weaves together a magnificent tapestry of femininity with an affectionate wink to classics of theater and cinema in this poignant story of love, loss and compassion." Metacritic, which uses a weighted average, assigned the film a score of 87 out of 100, based on 34 critics, indicating "universal acclaim". In 2018 the film was ranked 32nd in BBC's list of The 100 greatest foreign language films. British Film Institute ranked the film at No. 69 on its list of "90 great films of 1990s".

=== Awards and nominations ===
Academy Awards

- Best Foreign Language Film (won)

BAFTA Awards

- Best Film Not in the English Language (won)
- Best Direction (Almodóvar, won)
- Best Screenplay – Original (Almodóvar, nominated – lost to Being John Malkovich, Charlie Kaufman)

Golden Globe Awards

- Best Foreign Language Film (won)

Goya Awards
The film won several prizes at the Goya Awards:

- Best Actress (Roth, won)
- Best Cinematography (nominated – lost to Goya in Bordeaux)
- Best Costume Design (nominated – lost to Goya in Bordeaux)
- Best Director (Almodóvar, won)
- Best Editing (won)
- Best Film (won)
- Best Makeup and Hairstyles (nominated – lost to Goya in Bordeaux)
- Best Original Score (Iglesias, won)
- Best Production Design (nominated – lost to Goya in Bordeaux)
- Best Sound (won)
- Best Supporting Actress (Peña, nominee – María Galiana, Alone)
- Best Screenplay – Original (Almodóvar, nominee – lost to Alone, Benito Zambrano)
- Best Production Supervision (won)
- Best New Actress (San Juan, nominee - Ana Fernández, Alone)

Other awards

- Boston Society of Film Critics Award for Best Foreign Language Film (winner)
- British Independent Film Award for Best Foreign Language Film (winner)
- Butaca Award for Best Catalan Film Actress (Candela Peña, winner)
- Cannes Film Festival Best Director Award (winner)
- Cannes Film Festival Prize of the Ecumenical Jury (Pedro Almodóvar, winner)
- Chicago Film Critics Association Award for Best Foreign Language Film (winner)
- César Award for Best Foreign Film (winner)
- David di Donatello for Best Foreign Film (winner)
- Jameson People's Choice Award for Best European Director (winner)
- European Film Award for Best European Film (winner)
- European Film Award for Best European Actress (Cecilia Roth, winner)
- GLAAD Media Award for Outstanding Film in Limited Release (nominee)
- Independent Spirit Award for Best Foreign Language Film (nominee)
- London Film Critics Circle Award for Foreign Language Film of the Year (winner)
- Los Angeles Film Critics Association Award for Best Foreign Language Film (winner)
- Lumière Award for Best Foreign Film (winner)
- National Board of Review Award for Best Foreign Language Film (winner)
- New York Film Critics Circle Award for Best Foreign Language Film (winner)
- Premios ACE Award for Best Film (winner)
- Premios ACE Award for Best Actress – Cinema (Cecilia Roth, winner)
- Premios ACE Award for Best Supporting Actor – Cinema (Fernando Fernán Gómez, winner)
- Premios ACE Award for Best Supporting Actress – Cinema (Marisa Paredes, winner)
- Satellite Award for Best Foreign Language Film (winner; tied with Three Seasons)

== Stage adaptation ==
A stage adaptation of the film by Australian playwright Samuel Adamson received its world première at the Old Vic in London's West End on 4 September 2007. This production marked the first English language adaptation of any of Almodóvar's works and had his support and approval. Music by the film's composer, Alberto Iglesias, was incorporated into the stage production, with additional music by Max and Ben Ringham. It starred Colin Morgan, Diana Rigg, Lesley Manville, Mark Gatiss, Joanne Froggatt, and Charlotte Randle. It opened to generally good reviews, with some critics stating it improved upon the film.

It was later staged by the Melbourne Theatre Company at the Southbank Theatre in 2010, and was performed at the Odeon Theatre, Norwood, in Adelaide, in 2011.

In September 2020, the Finnish National Theatre staged a production of Adamson's play in Finnish, as Kaikki äidistäni. There was some a social media controversy about the casting of Janne Reinikainen as Agrado, as playing the character as a man meant representing them as a transvestite rather than as a transgender woman. However, this was resolved after it was ascertained that Adamson's adaptation portrayed the role as a transvestite.

== See also ==
- List of LGBT-related films of 1999
- List of submissions to the 72nd Academy Awards for Best Foreign Language Film
- List of Spanish submissions for the Academy Award for Best Foreign Language Film
- The Flower of My Secret
- Opening Night
- A Streetcar Named Desire
