= Orquesta Mondragón =

Spanish pop rock band

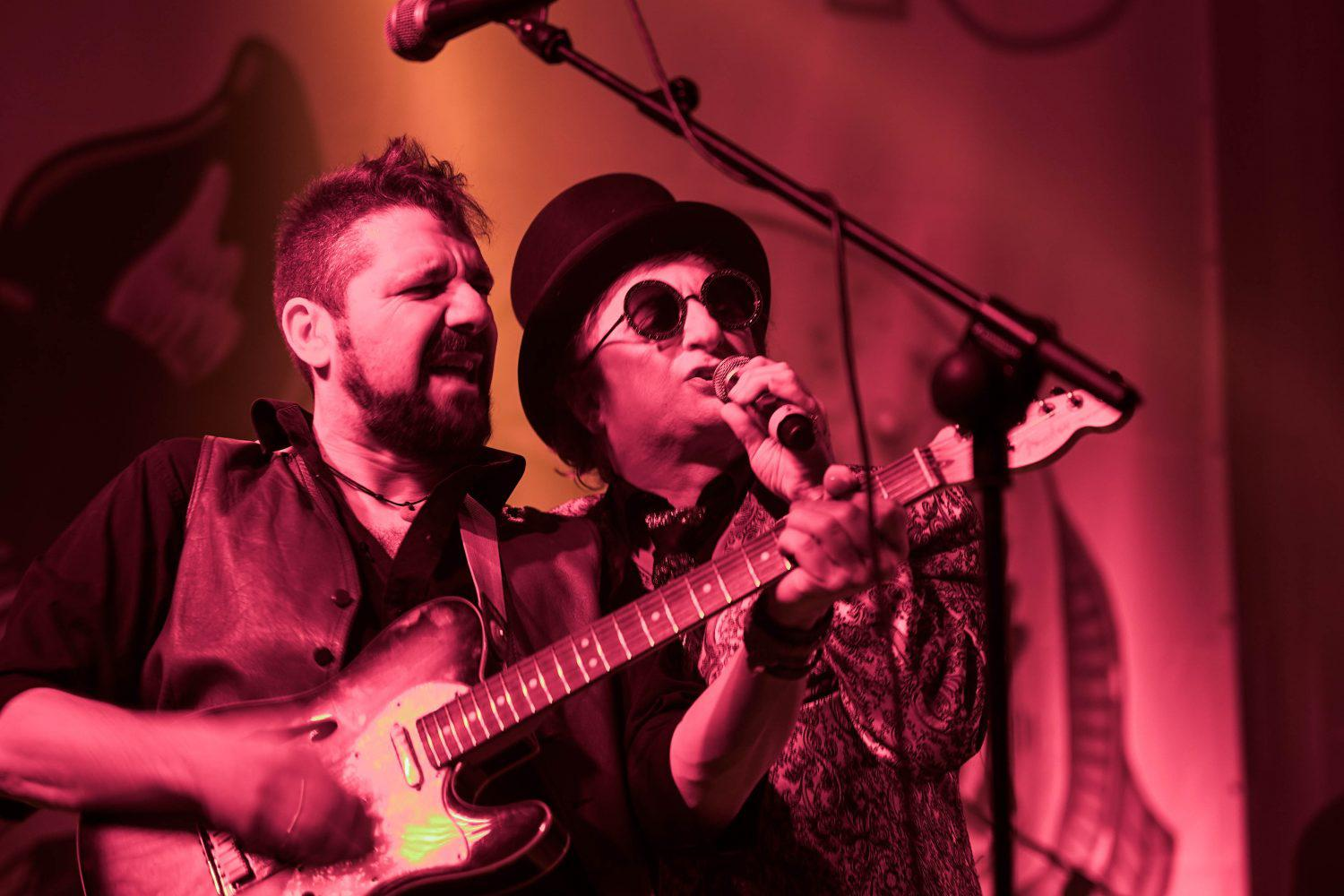

Background information
- Origin: San Sebastián, Basque Country, Spain
- Genres: Pop rock, New wave, Power pop, Comedy rock, Music hall
- Years active: 1976-present
- Labels: EMI Records, DRO Records, BMG Records, Avispa, El Cuarto Hombre
- Website: laorquestamondragon.com

Orquesta Mondragón is a Spanish pop rock band from San Sebastián (Basque Country), very popular in the 1980s, led by Javier Gurruchaga. The group was founded in 1976 and continues today.

== Discography ==
- Muñeca hinchable (1979)
- Bon voyage (1980)
- Bésame, tonta (soundtrack, 1982)
- Cumpleaños feliz (1983)
- ¡Es la guerra! (1984)
- Rock & Roll Circus (live, 1985)
- Ellos las prefieren gordas (1987)
- Una sonrisa, por favor (1989)
- El huevo de Colón (1992)
- Memorias de una vaca (live, 1995)
- Tómatelo con calma (2000)
- El maquinista de la general (2010)
- Liverpool Suite (2013)
- Anda suelto Satanás (2016)
