= Huidos =

- Theatrical release poster
- Directed by: Félix Sancho Gracia
- Screenplay by: Carlos Reigosa
- Starring: Sara Mora; Sancho Gracia; Fernando Valverde; Uxía Blanco
- Cinematography: Porfirio Enríquez
- Edited by: José María Biurrun
- Music by: Juan Pablo Muñoz Zielinski
- Production company: Sancho Gracia PC
- Distributed by: Columbia TriStar Films de España
- Release date: 23 April 1993
- Country: Spain
- Language: Spanish

Huidos is a 1993 Spanish drama film directed by Sancho Gracia from a screenplay by Carlos G. Reigosa. It stars Sancho Gracia, Sara Mora, Fernando Valverde, and Uxía Blanco.

== Plot ==
Set in Galicia, the plot follows the plight of two men (an anarchist and a communist) forced to retreat to the monte to hide from the Rebel forces.

== Cast ==
- Sara Mora as Luisa
- Uxía Blanco as María
- Sancho Gracia as Juan
- Fernando Valverde as Marcial
- Javier Bardem as Rafael
- Fernando Vivanco as doctor
- Aitor Merino as Luis
- Lola Baldrich

== Production ==
After José Luis Cuerda and Benito Rabal were reportedly pondered by Sancho Gracia as potential directors for the film, the project was entrusted to Manolo Matji. Matji departed from the film for undisclosed disagreements and producer and lead actor Sancho Gracia took over direction duties. Shooting locations included Lalín.

== Release ==
The film was released theatrically in Spain on 23 April 1993.

== Reception ==
Augusto Martínez Torres of El País wrote that Sancho Gracia "does not seem to believe too much in the strength of his images", underlining them in excess, while also abusing the slow motion.

== See also ==
- List of Spanish films of 1993
