= Manuela Vargas (flamenco dancer) =

Spanish flamenco dancer and choreographer

Manuela Hermoso Vargas known as Manuela Vargas (Seville, 1941 – Madrid, October 12, 2007) was a Spanish flamenco dancer.

== Biography ==
Manuela Vargas began working at the age of twelve in the tablao "El Guajiro", with the master Enrique El Cojo, and from there she moved to the Madrid tablao "El Duende". Her great opportunity came in 1964, when she won the International Dance Prize of the Theatre of Nations in Paris with the show Antología dramática del flamenco, by José Monleón. With this award-winning show she began her international career.

In 1965 she was present in the Spanish pavilion at the New York World's Fair. In 1966 she performed for four weeks at the Prince of Wales Theatre in London. In 1969 she achieved a notable success at the Teatro Avenida in Buenos Aires. On her return from the American tour Manuela Vargas received the National Flamenco Dance Award for the Chair of Flamencology in Jerez de la Frontera.

In 1969 she co-starred with Mark Stevens in Jaime Camino's film "España otra vez". In Spain, in addition to having her own company, she participated in significant productions, such as Medea directed by Miguel Narros in 1984; "Así que pasen cinco años" by Federico García Lorca, in a version by the Centro Dramático Nacional (1989) and, with the same organization: La Gallarda (1992), by Rafael Alberti. Other productions to review were: La petenera, El Sur and Fedra. She was present at the opening gala of Seville Expo'92. Her last well-known collaboration in the world of cinema was La flor de mi secreto, by Pedro Almodóvar with Joaquín Cortés.

In 2006 she was awarded the Gold Medal of Merit in the Fine Arts.

She had two daughters with Horacio Vial Serrano, Rocio and Macarena. She died on October 12, 2007, in Madrid at the age of 66, as a result of a cancer that she had been suffering for years. She was buried in the cemetery of San Fernando in Seville.
