= Cedillo de la Torre =

- Municipality
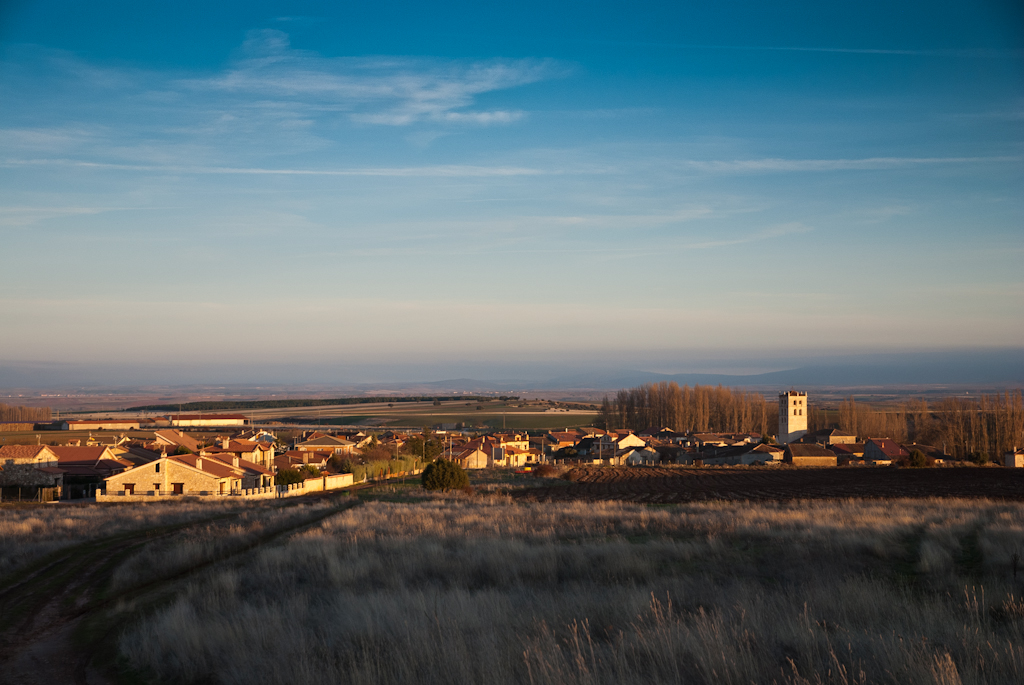
- Panoramic view of Cedillo de la Torre.

- Location in Spain. Cedillo de la Torre (Spain)
- Coordinates: 41°25′30″N 3°36′17″W
- Country: Spain
- Autonomous community: Castile and León
- Province: Segovia
- Municipality: Cedillo de la Torre

Area
  - Total: 23 km^{2} (8.9 sq mi)

Population (2025-01-01)
  - Total: 80
  - Density: 3.5/km^{2} (9.0/sq mi)
- Time zone: UTC+1 (CET)
  - Summer (DST): UTC+2 (CEST)
- Website: Official website

Cedillo de la Torre is a municipality located in the province of Segovia, Castile and León, Spain. According to the 2004 census (INE), the municipality has a population of 108 inhabitants.
