= Eleuterio Sánchez =

Spanish Merchero reformed outlaw

Eleuterio Sánchez holding a copy of his book Camina o revienta (Forge on or Die). Photographer: Luis Jauregialtzo, Argazki Press.

Eleuterio Sánchez Rodríguez (born 15 April 1942), known as El Lute, was at one time listed as Spain's "Most Wanted" criminal and later became a published writer. He was a legendary Spanish outlaw who escaped several times from prison after being convicted at age 23 of murder and sentenced to 30 years. He was only 19 and was sentenced to die. While in prison, he learned to read, earned a law degree, and became a writer, continuing to protest his innocence of the charges. He was pardoned and released on June 20, 1981, at the age of 39.

He published two memoirs, Camina o revienta (Walk or Die) (1977) and Mañana seré libre (Tomorrow I'll Be Free) (1979), while he was still in prison. These were later adapted as a two-part film series on his life directed by Vicente Aranda and released in 1987 and 1988.

== Early life and education ==
Eleuterio Sánchez Rodríguez was born in 1942 in Salamanca, in western Spain. He was born into a desperately poor merchero peasant family while his father was in prison. He never received any formal education as a child and was illiterate.

== Life ==
=== Early life ===
Sánchez and his family suffered discrimination as poor mercheros, who were nomadic craftsmen earning money as tinkers. They were often considered suspect by police and forced to move on. He married a young woman, Chelo, and they had a daughter. As a young man, he stole two hens and was sentenced to six months in prison.

Soon after his release, in 1965 Sánchez was arrested and convicted of murder for the armed robbery of a jewelry store in Madrid, in which a security guard was killed. At the age of 23, he was sentenced to death for the robbery and murder and also received "sentences totaling 1,000 years for other crimes". His death sentence was commuted to 30 years in a military prison.

Maintaining his innocence, Sánchez fought his conviction. Known as El Lute, during several escapes from prison, he was listed by the police as Spain's "most wanted" criminal. His reputation became legendary, and he was a symbol of resistance to the oppression of the poor under Franco. He was recaptured and used his time to educate himself.

Although Sánchez entered prison as an illiterate peasant, he taught himself to read and became self-educated. He earned a law degree, wrote five books, and published two memoirs while in prison. He continued his fight to clear his name.

=== Release from prison and later life ===
After the change in government, Sánchez was pardoned and released on June 20, 1981.

Afterward he married again, living in Tomares near Seville with his second wife Carmen Cañavate, and her two children. He left the persona of El Lute behind. In 1987 and 1988 a two-part film series was released about his life. Based on his memoirs, it was directed by Vicente Aranda, who portrayed Sánchez in the context of Franco's Spain.

In February 2006, Sánchez was arrested for alleged abuse of his wife, Carmen Cañavate, at home and threats on the street. His wife told police he had abused her at home, and Sánchez was arrested in Seville. Under the law he could be sentenced to 20 months in prison, lose the right to bear arms, and be required to keep 300 meters from his spouse. He was later released on bail.

In April 2008, the court found Sánchez not guilty; the judge noted that there were accusations of mutual infidelity, the couple were separating and arguing over property, and his ex-wife had failed to bring medical records, although claiming to have been treated for injury. The judge concluded there was too much contradictory testimony to support the charges.

== Books ==
- Camina o revienta (Forge On or Die) (1977), published while he was still in prison.
- Mañana seré libre (Tomorrow I'll Be free) (1979), published while he was in prison.
- Una pluma entre rejas (A Pen Behind Bars) (1981)
- Cuando resistir es Vencer (When to Resist Is to Succeed) (2013)

Bonilla, Kristina; "El Lute: die letzte Flucht." Roman, Piper Verlander, ISBN 3-492-02373-8. Munchen, Zurich, 1978

== Representation in other media ==
- In 1979, Eleuterio Sánchez's life was the subject of a hit single "El Lute" by Boney M. from the album Oceans of Fantasy.
- Sánchez was the subject of a two-part film series by Vicente Aranda adapted from his two memoirs, El Lute: Camina o revienta (1987), and El Lute II: Mañana seré libre] (1988). Sánchez was played by Imanol Arias.
- In the 2010 Spanish dramedy The Last Circus, which has a plot set in the 1970s, Eleuterio Sánchez is mentioned repeatedly on news broadcasts.
