= Golden Balls (film) =

- Theatrical release poster
- Spanish: Huevos de oro
- Directed by: Bigas Luna
- Written by: Cuca Canals; Bigas Luna
- Produced by: Andrés Vicente Gómez
- Starring: Javier Bardem; Maria de Medeiros; Maribel Verdú; Élisa Touati; Raquel Bianca
- Cinematography: José Luis Alcaine
- Edited by: Carmen Frías
- Music by: Nicola Piovani
- Production companies: LolaFilms; Filmauro; Hugo Films; Lumière
- Distributed by: United International Pictures
- Release date: 24 September 1993 (Spain)
- Running time: 95 min.
- Countries: Spain; Italy; France
- Language: Spanish

Golden Balls (Spanish: Huevos de oro) is a 1993 film directed by Bigas Luna and starring Javier Bardem.

== Plot ==
Benito González is a flamboyant engineer in Melilla, with a brash and pushy personality. His dream is to build the tallest building ever in the region. After his girlfriend leaves him, he devotes himself entirely to his ambitions, deciding to let nothing get in his way. He marries the daughter of a billionaire, intending to use her father's money to realise his project. Benito waltzes his way through a career of excess, fetishes and deceptions, but the personal conflicts he unleashes ultimately send his life spiraling down to disaster.

The film makes direct and symbolic references to the work of Spanish Surrealist painter Salvador Dalí.

== Cast ==
- Javier Bardem as Benito González
- Maria de Medeiros as Marta
- Maribel Verdú as Claudia
- Elisa Touati as Rita
- Raquel Bianca as Ana
- Alessandro Gassmann as Miguel
- Francesco Dominedò as Mosca
- Albert Vidal as Folch
- Benicio del Toro as Bob
- Ángel de Andrés as Gil

== Production ==
The film was produced by Andrés Vicente Gómez. Exterior filming included Benidorm, Melilla, and Miami.

== Release ==
The film was released theatrically in Spain on 24 September 1993.

== Reception ==
Peter Besas of Variety decried Golden Balls as a "meretricious and ultimately non-erotic film".

== See also ==
- List of Spanish films of 1993
