= Imanol Arias =

Spanish actor and film director (born 1956)

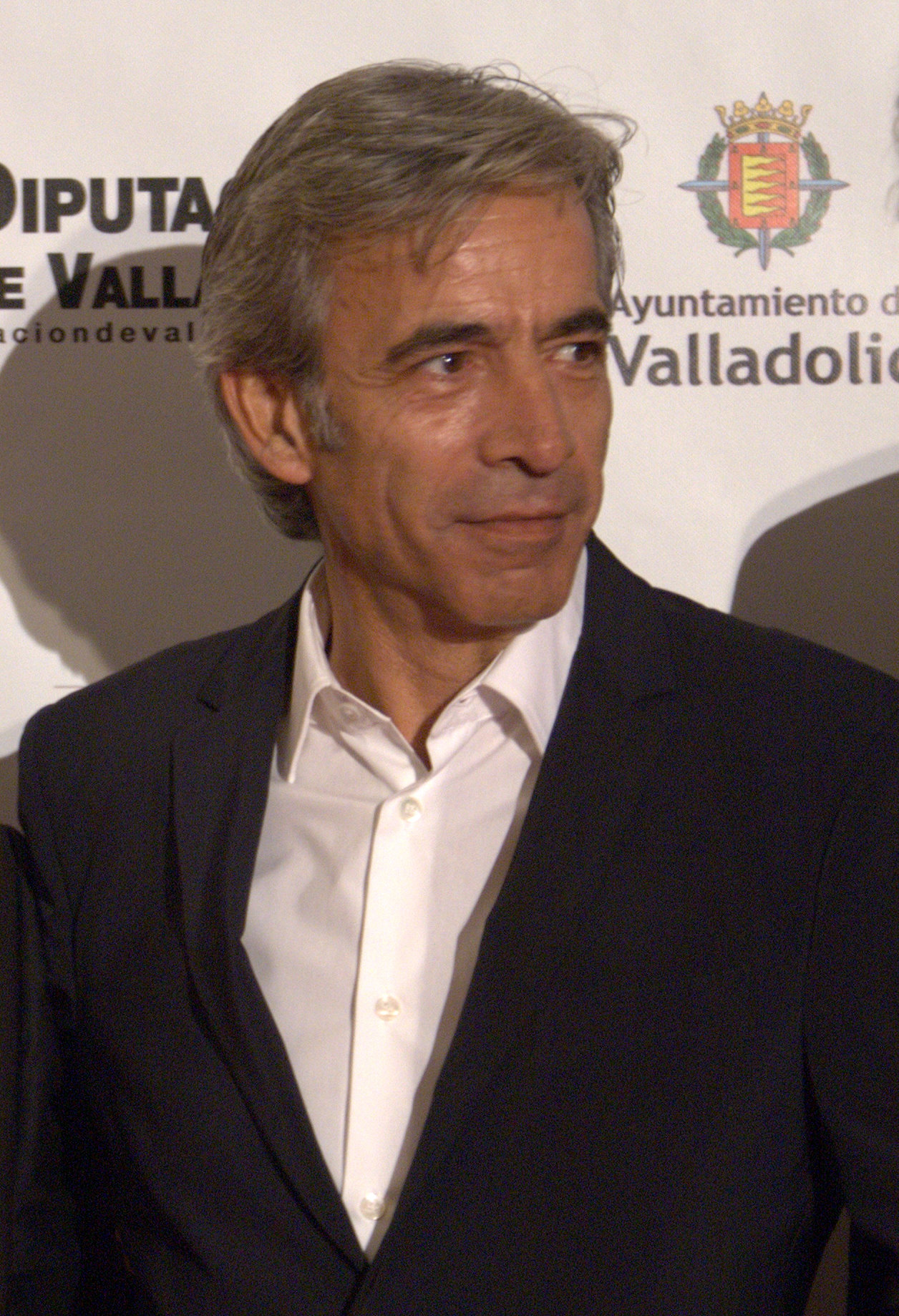
- Arias in 2011
- Born: Manuel María Arias Domínguez; 26 April 1956 (age 70); Riaño, Spain
- Occupation: Actor
- Children: 2

Manuel María Arias Domínguez (born 26 April 1956), better known as Imanol Arias, is a Spanish actor.

In his career beginnings, Arias was a recurring face of Basque cinema. His career in the 21st-century is marked by his portrayal of Antonio Alcántara in television series Cuéntame cómo pasó from 2001 to 2023. In addition to his credits in Spanish film and television titles, Arias has also worked in the Argentine film industry.

== Life and career ==
Manuel María Arias Domínguez was born in Riaño, province of León, on 26 April 1956 but soon moved to Ermua, Biscay, where he was raised.

Imanol Arias began his career with a travelling theatre group performing in the Basque Country of northern Spain. He debuted on television in 1976. He made his big screen debut in La Corea. In 1987 he won the prize at the San Sebastian Film Festival for the role of Eleuterio Sánchez in El Lute: Run for Your Life (1987).

Since 1976 he has appeared in some seventy different films and television series. In 1996 he made his directorial film debut in Un asunto privado. He had previously directed a television show in 1989.

From 1984 to 2009, he was in a non-marital relationship with actress Pastora Vega, whom with he had two children.

Between 2001 and 2023, he starred in the Televisión Española prime-time series Cuéntame cómo pasó as Antonio Alcántara, the father of a Spanish middle-class family during the years of the rule of Francisco Franco, the transition to democracy, and the current democracy.

In 2013 Arias worked on the Spanish dubbing of the video game Battlefield 4 as Captain Roland Garrison.

At Gijón International Film Festival in 2014, he received the Nacho Martinez Award.

Imanol Arias is Ambassador for UNICEF.

On 7 April 2016, Imanol Arias was accused of tax evasion and money laundering in the Panama Papers scandal as the owner of an offshore company, Trekel Trading Limited, based on the island nation of Niue that held a bank account under his complete control at the Swiss bank Banque Franck SA.

In June 2024, Arias paid €275,000 in order to settle his debts with the tax office and avoid going to trial on tax evasion charges.

== Filmography ==
Year	Title	Role	Notes	Ref.
1976	La Corea		Feature film debut	
1980	Elisita			
1982	Cecilia			
1982	Laberinto de pasiones (Labyrinth of Passion)	Riza Niro		
1982	Demonios en el jardín (Demons in the Garden)	Juan		
1982	La colmena (The Beehive)	El Tísico		
1983	Bearn o la sala de las muñecas	Don Juan Mayol		
1984	Camila	Ladislao Gutiérrez		
1984	La muerte de Mikel	Mikel Miranda		
1985	Fuego eterno (Eternal Fire)	Pierre		
1986	Lulú de noche (Lulu by Night)			
1986	Bandera negra			
1986	Tiempo de silencio (Time of Silence)	Pedro Martín		
1987	El Lute: camina o revienta (El Lute: Run for Your Life)	Eleuterio		
1987	Divinas palabras (Divine Words)	Séptimo Miau		
1988	El Lute II: mañana seré libre (El Lute II: Tomorrow I'll be Free)	Eleuterio		
1990	A solas contigo (Alone Together)	Javier Artabe		
1991	Veraz	Paco		
1992	Una mujer bajo la lluvia (A Woman in the Rain)	Ramón		
1993	El amante bilingüe (The Bilingual Lover)	Juan		
1993	Tierno verano de lujurias y azoteas	Doria		
1993	Intruso (Intruder)	Angel		
1994	Todos los hombres sois iguales (All Men Are the Same)	Juan Luis		
1995	Un asunto privado	—N/a	Director	
1995	Sálvate si puedes	Roberto		
1995	La leyenda de Balthasar el castrado	Duque de Arcos		
1995	La flor de mi secreto (The Flower of My Secret)	Paco		
1996	A tres bandas			
1997	Territorio comanche (Comanche Territory)	Mikel Uriarte		
1996	Ilona Arrives with the Rain			
1996	África	Arturo		
1997	Rigor mortis	Asesino		
1997	En brazos de la mujer madura (In Praise of Older Women)	Dávalos		
1997	Buenos Aires me mata			
2000	Esperando al mesías (Waiting for the Messiah)	Baltasar		
2000	La voz de su amo (His Master's Voice)	Sacristán		
2001	A House with a View of the Sea			
2001	Salvajes (Savages)	Eduardo		
2003	Besos de gato			
2003	Los reyes magos (The 3 Wise Men)	Baltasar	Voice	
2006	La semana que viene (sin falta)	Teo Morales		
2007	Lo que tiene el otro			
2007	Nocturna	Pastor de gatos	Voice	
2010	Pájaros de papel (Paper Birds)	Jorge del Pino		
2011	Mi primera boda (My First Wedding)	Miguel Ángel Bernardo		
2015	Anacleto: agente secreto (Spy Time)	Anacleto		
2019	De sable et de feu			
2019	Sordo (The Silent War)	Sargento Castillo		
2019	Legado en los huesos (The Legacy of the Bones)	Padre Sarasola		
2020	Ofrenda a la tormenta (Offering to the Storm)	Padre Sarasola		
2020	Retrato de mujer blanca con pelo cano y arrugas			
2024	La bandera	Tomás		
2024	El molino			
2024	Nueva tierra	Gregorio		

== Television ==
- Arnau, els dies secrets (1993) as Yazid
- Cervantes (TVE, 1981)
- Juanita, la Larga (TVE, 1982)
- Anillos de oro (TVE, 1983)
- Brigada Central (TVE, 1989–1992)
- Querido maestro (Telecinco, 1997)
- Camino de Santiago (1999)
- Dime que me quieres (Antena 3, 2001)
- Severo Ochoa. La conquista de un Nobel (TVE, 2001)
- Cuéntame cómo pasó (TVE, 2001–2023)
- Atrapados (2003)
- Mentiras (2005)
- Un país para comérselo (TVE, 2010)
- Velvet Colección (Movistar+, 2017)
- La última palabra, (2020)
- The Best Heart Attack of My Life, (2025)

== Accolades ==
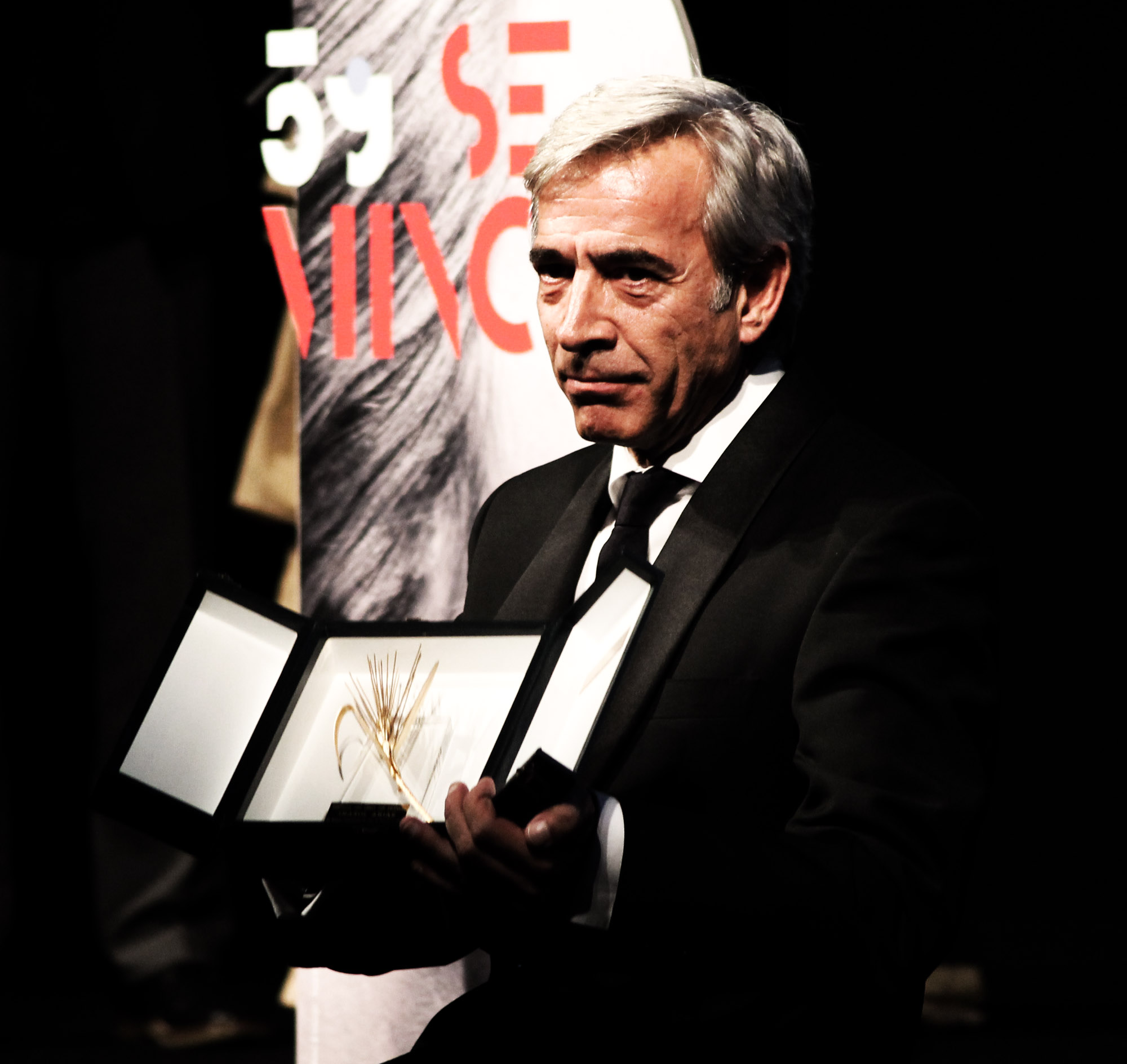
Arias receiving the Honorary Spike at the 59th Seminci in 2014

Year	Award	Category	Work	Result	Ref.
1987	35th San Sebastián International Film Festival	Silver Shell for Best Actor	El Lute: Run for Your Life	Won	
1988	2nd Goya Awards	Best Actor	El Lute: Run for Your Life	Nominated	
1989	3rd Goya Awards	Best Actor	El Lute II: Tomorrow I'll be Free	Nominated	
1991	5th Goya Awards	Best Actor	Alone Together	Nominated	
1994	8th Goya Awards	Best Actor	Intruder	Nominated	
2014	59th Valladolid International Film Festival	Honorary Spike	—N/a	Won	
