= Intruder (1993 film) =

Intruso
- Theatrical release poster
- Directed by: Vicente Aranda
- Screenplay by: Álvaro del Amo; Vicente Aranda
- Produced by: Pedro Costa, Atrium Productions
- Starring: Imanol Arias; Victoria Abril; Antonio Valero
- Cinematography: José Luis Alcaine
- Edited by: Teresa Font
- Music by: José Nieto
- Distributed by: United International Pictures
- Release date: 3 September 1993 (Spain)
- Running time: 85 minutes
- Country: Spain
- Language: Spanish
- Budget: P208,120,000

Intruder (Spanish: Intruso) is a 1993 Spanish film, written and directed by Vicente Aranda. It stars Victoria Abril, Imanol Arias and Antonio Valero. The film is a psychological thriller about a middle-class woman torn between her love for her spouse and her ill ex-husband, both of them who were her childhood friends. Intruso received five nominations to the Goya Awards in 1994 including Best Picture.

== Plot ==
Luisa, a middle-class housewife living in Santander, Northern Spain, has a comfortable existence with her husband Ramiro, who has a successful medico-dental career. They have two children, Ramirín and Ángela. One winter day, Luisa, stopping in a traffic light, spots her ex-husband, Ángel, who is selling tissues on the streets. After that brief encounter, the next day Luisa looks for Ángel in the area where she saw him before. She finds him wandering about the city in destitution. Overcome with sentimentality and, over Ramiro's objections, Luisa takes Ángel into her home in an effort to help him and rebuild the friendship the three of them once had. Luisa is convinced that destiny has reunited them.

Luisa, Ángel and Ramiro were inseparable friends during their childhood and youth. Once they became adults, they formed an uneasy love triangle in which the two men were rivals for Luisa's affection. Luisa married Ángel, but two years later, she left him to marry Ramiro, who she thought was the one she was meant to be with.

Ramiro is not pleased to see his former friend again, who he wishfully presumed to be dead. Unwillingly, he accepts Ángel's presence. He thought Ángel was working in construction, living a prosperous life in South America. However, after his divorce from Luisa, Ángel spent all his money in a restless existence. He reappears after more than ten years of absence, broke and ill.

Ángel still loves Luisa and has never overcome his feelings of resentment about their divorce. He still wears the ring she gave him on their first and only wedding anniversary. The ring has the inscription: P.R.E.O.M. that stands for: To be reunited in the other world (Spanish: para reencontrarse en el otro mundo).

Initially overwhelmed by Luisa's mystical and deranged streak, Ángel tries to leave, but Luisa's daughter Ángela brings him back home. He has fits, foaming, and bleeding in the mouth. Medical results show that he is terminally ill. Soon, Ramiro and Ángel shift from friends to enemies and have a bitter confrontation. Luisa is torn between them. She loves Ángel as a part of herself, but also loves her husband and beyond reason, wants to have them both.

Ángel establishes a friendship with the couple's children, Ramirin and Ángela. The girl is more sympathetic and the boy, always taking his father's side, is somewhat hostile. Ángel spellbinds them both with his offbeat stories and his directness. He takes them on a short trip to the beach where he reenacts with them a scene from his own childhood. He sees in the children the reflection of his own youth and his erstwhile friendship with Luisa and Ramiro. While Ángel is at the beach, Ramiro and Luisa find out that Ángel is terminally ill and has very little time to live. Ramiro hopes he can wait out Ángel's declining health, while Luisa does not accept the medical verdict. As Ángel's health worsens, Luisa insists upon caring for him in the house rather than sending him off to a hospital. He is soon bedridden and in constant pain. Luisa has sex with him, and when she returns to Ramiro in their bedroom, she has sex with her husband. She loves them both intensely and equally.

When Ángel's condition worsens, he falls into a coma; Luisa, through force of will alone, brings him back to life to the astonishment of her husband and children. She takes Ángel to bed, and in spite of his illness has sex with him. She does not deceive her husband, telling him so right afterward. Ramiro takes the information with resignation, knowing that the end is near for his rival. When Ángel is at death's door, Ramiro prepares a lethal doze of anesthetic to accelerate his death. In the final moment, the dying man makes a final, desperate bid to steal his ex-wife away from her spouse. He grasps the hypodermic needle with its overdose of anesthetic and kills Ramiro with the injection. Dragging himself to his rival's marital bed, Ángel dies next to Luisa. Luisa then takes a ring with P.R.E.O.M. written on the inside from her dresser and puts it on the now-dead Ramiro, to bring the two ex-friends and rivals together in the afterlife. Luisa and the children follow two hearses to the cemetery, with both coffins having the inscriptions written: to be reunited in the other world.

== Production ==
Intruso was originated with the international success of Amantes, a film, like Intruso, directed by Vicente Aranda, scripted by him with the collaboration of Alvaro del Amo and produced by Pedro Costa. Vicente Aranda was filming El Amante Bilingüe when Pedro Costa suggested to him to make what would become Intruso. Aranda was still filming El Amante Bilingüe but he started pre-production before finishing the previous film.

Intruso began to be filmed just days after the conclusion of El Amante Bilingüe. Both films appeared in 1993. El Amante Bilingüe opened in theaters in April 1994 and Intruso six months later.

== Cast ==
After teaming in Amantes, director Vicente Aranda and star Victoria Abril reunited again in Intruso, their ninth collaboration.

Imanol Arias plays the role of Ángel, a man who his life destroyed by those who now are giving him shelter. He becomes the catalyst of the conflicting love triangle in which their encounter derives. Imanol Arias had worked with Vicente Aranda before in El Lute, a film that was an artistic and commercial success. He was also the star of Aranda's previous film El Amante Bilingüe.

The role of the husband, after being declined by other actors, fell on Antonio Valero, who had worked with Vicente Aranda and Imanol Arias in El Lute. Naím Thomas, who played Ángel as a child, has had a successful acting and singing career in Spain.

- Imanol Arias as Ángel
- Victoria Abril as Luisa
- Antonio Valero as Ramiro
- Alicia Rozas as Ángela
- Carlos Moreno as Ramirín
- Rebeca Roizo as Luisa as a child
- Naím Thomas as Ángel as a child
- Alejandro Sánchez as Ramiro as a child
- Alicia Agut as Juliana

== Themes ==
One of the main themes of Intruso is the destructive potential of obsessive passion and its links with death and sex. Intruso forms with Amantes (1991) and Celos (1999) a trilogy of films about love as uncontrollable passion that ends tragically. These three films directed by Vicente Aranda are loosely based in real crime stories.

== Critical reception ==
In a contemporary review for the newspaper and website El País, Augusto Martínez Torres praised the film's dialogue, performances and cinematography, particularly the work of José Luis Alcaine. He also gave particular praise to how Luisa and Ramiro's children's observations contributed to the development of the narrative.

A review written by José Luis Sánchez Noriega, a professor of film theory and history of cinema at the Complutense University in Madrid, describes Aranda's direction and cinematography as restrained. He praises the film's editing, performances and visual storytelling, while offering mild criticism to the dialogue given to the child characters.

== Accolades ==
- Five Goya Awards Nominations: Best Film, Best Director, Best Actor (Imanol Arias), Best editing, Best Score (1994)
- Fotogramas de Plata: Nomination: Best Movie Actress (Victoria Abril)

== Bibliography ==
- Cánovás Belchí, Joaquín (ed.), Varios Autores,: Miradas sobre el cine de Vicente Aranda, Murcia: Universidad de Murcia, 2000.P. Madrid
- Colmena, Enrique: Vicente Aranda, Cátedra, Madrid, 1986, ISBN 978-84-376-1431-1
- Perriam, Christopher: "Stars and Masculinities in Spanish Cinema: From Banderas to Bardem", Oxford University Press, 2003, ISBN 978-0198159964
