= Juan Echanove =

Spanish actor (born 1961)

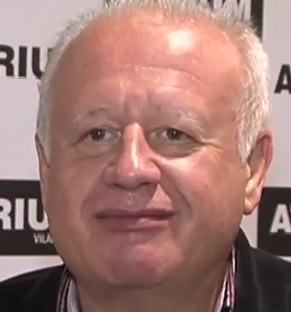
- Born: Juan Echanove Labanda; 1 April 1961 (age 64); Madrid, Spain
- Occupation: Actor

Juan Echanove Labanda (born 1 April 1961) is a Spanish actor.

At Gijón International Film Festival in 2002, he received the Nacho Martínez Award.

== Selected filmography ==
=== Film ===
Year	Title	Role	Notes	Ref.
1984	La noche más hermosa			
1985	Tiempo de silencio			
1987	Divinas palabras (Divine Words)	Miguelín "el Padrones"		
1988	Miss Caribe			
1989	Bajarse al moro (Going South Shopping)	Jaimito		
1989	El vuelo de la paloma (The Flight of the Dove)	Juancho		
1990	A solas contigo (Alone Together)	Álvaro Lahuerta		
1990	Rateta, rateta	Serrano		
1991	La noche más larga (The Longest Night)	Juan Tarna		
1992	Orquesta Club Virginia (Club Virginia Orchestra)	El Maño		
1993	Mi hermano del alma (My Soul Brother)	Sebastián		
1993	Madregilda	Franco / Sosias		
1994	Historias de la puta mili	Arensivia		
1995	La flor de mi secreto (The Flower of My Secret)	Angel		
1995	Una casa en las afueras (A House on the Outskirts)	Daniel		
1997	Memorias del ángel caído	Carlos		
1997	Suspiros de España (y Portugal)	Fray Clemente / Pepe		
1997	Siempre hay un camino a la derecha (There Is Always a Right Way)	Pepe		
1998	Sus ojos se cerraron y el mundo sigue andando (Tangos Are for Two)	Gustavo		
1998	Los años bárbaros (The Stolen Years)	Víctor		
2000	Adiós con el corazón (Goodbye from the Heart)	Pepe		
2001	Sin noticias de Dios (Don't Tempt Me)			
2003	Los Reyes Magos	Melchor	Voice	
2005	Alatriste	Francisco de Quevedo		
2005	Morir en San Hilario			
2006	Bienvenido a casa (Welcome Home)	Félix		
2008	Manolete			
2017	Te esperaré	Juan Benítez		

== Theatre ==
As director

- Visitando al Señor Green (2005)

As actor

- El precio (2003), by Arthur Miller.
- Cómo canta una ciudad de noviembre a noviembre (2003).
- El verdugo (2000), based on the film by Luis García Berlanga.
- El cerdo (1993).

== Television ==
- Desaparecidos (2020–)
- El Cid (2020)
- Un paso adelante (2003).
- La vida de Rita (2003).
- Cuéntame cómo pasó (2001, 2005 - 2017).
- Hermanos de leche (1994).
- Chicas de hoy en día (Fernando Colomo, 1991)
- Vísperas (1987)
- Turno de oficio (1986–1987)

== Discography ==
- Mucho más que dos (1993)
