= Antonio Valero (actor) =

Spanish actor (born 1955)

- Born: Antonio Valero Osma; 25 August 1955 (age 70); Burjassot, Valencia, (Spain)
- Occupation: Actor
- Years active: 1961 - present

Antonio Valero Osma (born 25 August 1955) is a Spanish actor.

== Career ==
He began his career as actor in the theater in Catalan with the directors Fabia Puigserver, Albert Boadella and Pere Planella. He made his film debut with La Mitad del Cielo (1986) directed by Manuel Gutierrez Aragon. Among his film are: Adios pequena (1986) by Imanol Uribe; El Lute: camina o revienta (1987), by Vicente Aranda; El Juego mas Divertido (1987) by Emilio Martinez Lazaro: Despues del Sueño (1992), by Mario Camus and Intruso (1993) by Vicente Aranda. He appeared in TVE in La forja de un rebelde (The Forging of a Rebel) (1990), directed by Mario Camus, where he had the starring role as the alter ego of Arturo Barea, author of the novel.

== Selected filmography ==
Mallorca Files episode 6 2021

- Pasaje al amanecer (2017)
- Aunque estés lejos (2003)
- Lista de Espera (2000)
- Intruso (1993)
- El Lute: camina o revienta(1986)
- Adios Pequena (1986)
- Half of Heaven (1986)
