= Shadows in a Conflict =

1993 film

- Original title: Sombras en una batalla
- Directed by: Mario Camus
- Written by: Mario Camus
- Starring: Carmen Maura
- Cinematography: Manuel Velasco
- Release date: 10 September 1993
- Running time: 106 minutes
- Country: Spain
- Language: Spanish

Shadows in a Conflict (Spanish: Sombras en una batalla) is a 1993 Spanish drama film directed by Mario Camus. It was entered into the 18th Moscow International Film Festival. The film portrays the dirty war against ETA waged by elements of the Spanish State.

== Cast ==
- Carmen Maura as Ana
- Joaquim de Almeida as José (as Joaquim De Almeida)
- Tito Valverde as Darío
- Sonia Martín as Blanca
- Ramón Langa as Fernando
- Paco Hernández as Hombre I (as Francisco Hernández)
- Felipe Vélez as Hombre II
- Miguel Zúñiga as Funcionario
- Isabel de Castro as Madre José (as Isabel De Castro)
- Elisa Lisboa as Amalia
