= Tito Valverde =

Spanish actor (born 1951)

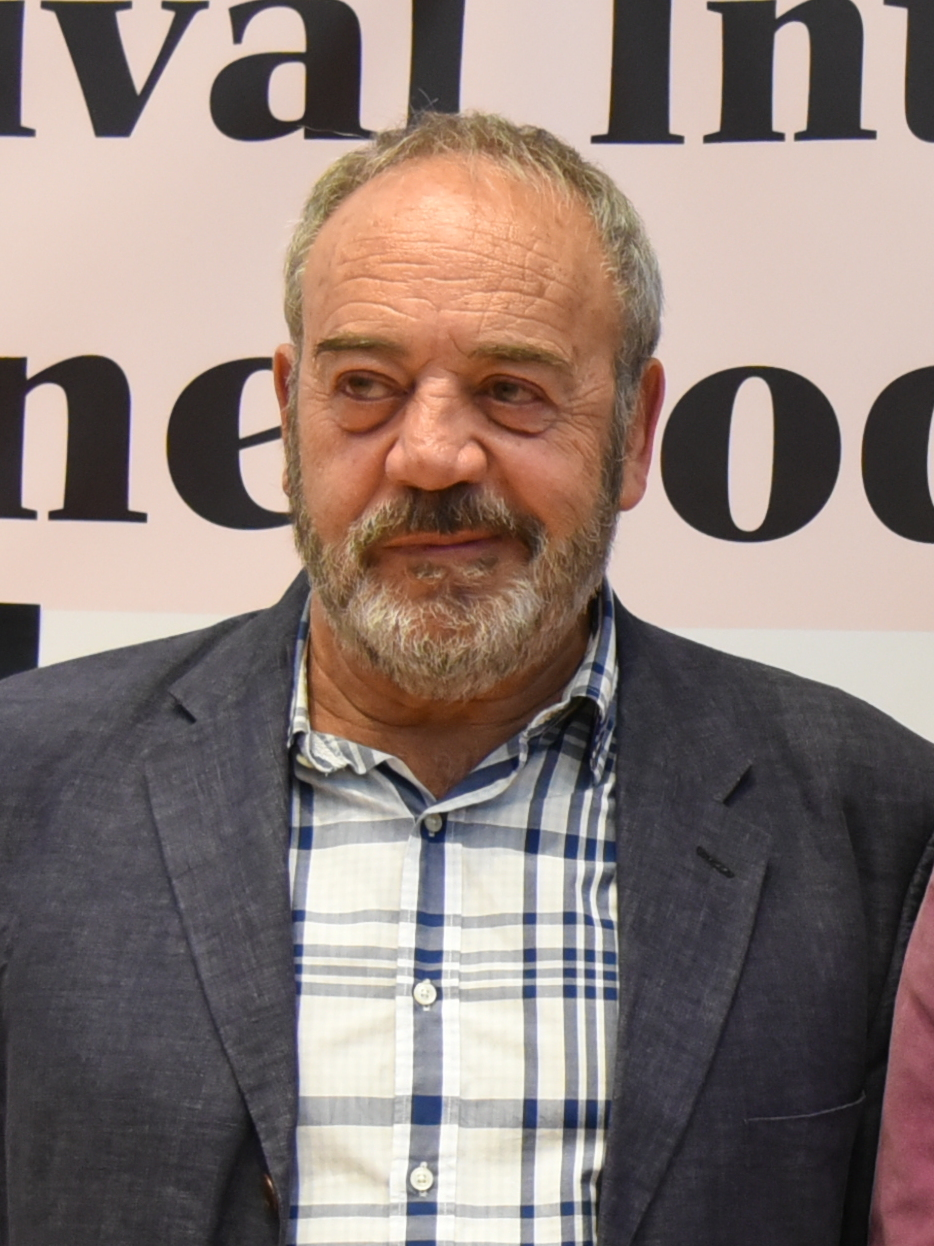
- At the FECISO festival in 2017
- Born: Fernando García Valverde; 26 April 1951 (age 75); Ávila, Spain
- Other name: Fernando Valverde
- Occupation: Actor
- Years active: 1977-present

Fernando García Valverde (born 26 April 1951), better known as Fernando Valverde or Tito Valverde, is a Spanish actor. Born in Ávila, he became very popular to a television audience for his performance as Pepe in the 1995 comedy television series Pepa y Pepe. He has later starred as Gerardo Castilla in the television series El comisario.

== Selected filmography ==
Film

Year	Title	Role	Notes	Ref.
1977	La guerra de papá			
1987	El bosque animado (The Enchanted Forest)	Geraldo		
1989	Esquilache	Bernardo		
1989	Amanece, que no es poco	Morencos		
1991	Lo más natural (The Most Natural Thing)	Iván		
1991	Alas de mariposa (Butterfly Wings)	Gabriel		
1993	Huidos	Marcial		
1993	Sombras en una batalla (Shadows in a Conflict)	Darío		
1993	¿Por qué lo llaman amor cuando quieren decir sexo? (Why Do They Call It Love When They Mean Sex?)	Karim		
1993	The Devil's Breath (El aliento del diablo)	Ginés		
1994	Amor propio	Hilario Lanza		
1995	La ley de la frontera (The Law of the Frontier)	Sargento de la Guardia Civil		
1997	El color de las nubes (The Color of the Clouds)	José María		
2001	La gran vida (Living It Up)	Salva		
2005	Reinas (Queens)	Héctor		
2013	15 años y un día (15 Years and One Day)	Max		
2019	Mientras dure la guerra (While at War)	General Cabanellas		
2023	El fantástico caso del Golem (The Fantastic Golem Affairs)	Gustavo		
2023	¡Vaya vacaciones! (One Hell of a Holiday!)	José		
2025	Votemos (All in Favor)	Fernando		

Television

Year	Title	Role	Notes	Ref.
1986	Tristeza de amor	Blas		
1993	Celia	Tío Rodrigo		
1995	Pepa y Pepe	Pepe		
1996–1998	Todos los hombres sois iguales	Manolo		
1997	La banda de Pérez	Alfonso		
1999–2009	El comisario	Gerardo Castilla	12 seasons	
2013–2014	Velvet	Don Rafael Márquez		
2014–2015	Sin identidad	Enrique Vergel		
2019	Matadero	Salvador		
2021	Alba	Víctor Entrerríos		
2022	A Private Affair	Ramirez		
2024	Asalto al Banco Central (Bank Under Siege)	José Luis Aramburu Topete		
