= Javier Gurruchaga =

Spanish singer, actor, comedian and presenter

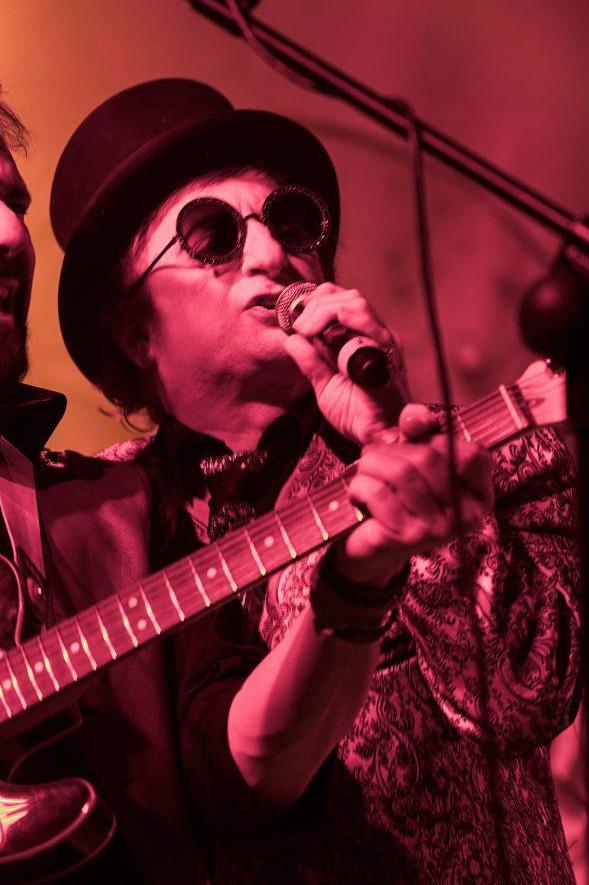
- Performing with Orquesta Mondragón in 2019
- Born: Ignacio Javier Gurruchaga Iriarte; 12 February 1958 (age 67); San Sebastián, Gipuzkoa, Spain
- Occupations: Singer; actor; presenter

Javier Gurruchaga is a Spanish singer, actor, comedian, and presenter. He is the longstanding frontman of Orquesta Mondragón. He is also known for his television appearances in comedy shows such as Viaje con nosotros.

== Life and career ==
Ignacio Javier Gurruachaga Iriarte was born in San Sebastián on 12 February 1958. He founded Orquesta Mondragón in 1976. He hosted the variety comedy show Viaje con nosotros, which began airing on TVE in 1988. He earned nominations to the Goya Award for Best Supporting Actor for his performances in the films The Dumbfounded King and Banderas, the Tyrant.

The Spanish Ministry of Culture and Sport granted him the Gold Medal of Merit in the Fine Arts in 2021.
