= Rosa Maria Sardà =

Spanish actress (1941–2020)

Rosa María Sardà
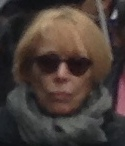
- Sardà in 2012
- Born: Rosa María Sardà Támaro; 30 July 1941; Barcelona, Spain
- Died: 11 June 2020 (aged 78); Barcelona, Spain
- Occupation: Actress
- Years active: 1969–2020

Rosa María Sardà i Támaro (30 July 1941 – 11 June 2020) was a Spanish actress. Her career in theater ranks her as one of the leading actresses of the Spanish scene.

== Early life ==
Sardà was born in Barcelona in 1941, and grew up in the Sant Andreu district of the capital, where her career as a stage actress began. She was the elder sister of the journalist and writer Xavier Sardà.

== Career ==
Self-taught, Sardà began to do amateur theater in her hometown, Horta. In 1962, she made the leap to professional theater in the Dora Santacreu and Carlos Lucena company with the play Cena de matrimonios by Alfonso Paso; she then moved to the Alejandro Ulloa company and, later, to that of Pau Garsaball, with the work En Baldiri de la Costa. In the 1970s, she starred in various theatre productions, such as The House of Bernarda Alba.

Later, she worked in television, in 1975, starring in Una vella, coneguda olor, by Josep Maria Benet i Jornet and in 1979, leading the program Festa amb Rosa Maria Sardà. She also started doing movies with El vicari d'Olot (1981), by Ventura Pons.

During the 1980s, she presented the television show Ahí te quiero ver.

In 1993, she starred in Why Do They Call It Love When They Mean Sex?, for which she won the Goya Award for Best Supporting Actress. The next year she was awarded the Creu de Sant Jordi, but she later returned it in 2017 (see personal life section).

In 2001, she starred in No Shame, for which she again won the Goya Award for Best Supporting Actress. The next year, she starred in the comedy My Mother Likes Women. In 2005, she starred in the television series Abuela de verano. Her son, Pol Mainat, starred alongside her.

In 2010, she was awarded a Gold Medal from the Spanish Film Academy. In 2016, she was awarded the Feroz de Honor (Feroz of Honour). She was due to receive the Fotogramas de Plata award in 2020, but the ceremony was cancelled.

She hosted the Goya Awards gala three times throughout her career. Critic Javier Zurro has considered her the best host in the history of the awards.

== Personal life ==
Sardà was married to Josep Maria Mainat, a member of the comedy group La Trinca. (Note: In a 2016 El Pais profile it is stated that it was a marriage "without papers".) In 1975 they had a son Pol Mainat, who also become an actor. Sardà and Mainat divorced circa 2002.

Sardà was always a politically committed person. She defined herself as “radically republican, federalist and socialist." In 2017, Sardà returned her Creu de Sant Jordi award, one of the highest decorations of the Catalonian Government, due to her opposition to the Catalan "procés" and the corruption scandal of former Catalan president Jordi Pujol.

In 2014, Sardà was diagnosed with lymphoma, and later took a hiatus from acting. She died from the disease on 11 June 2020 in Barcelona, aged 78.

== Selected filmography ==
| Year | Title | Role | Notes | Ref. |
|---|---|---|---|---|
| 1993 | ¿Por qué lo llaman amor cuando quieren decir sexo? | Sole | | |
| 1994 | Alegre ma non troppo | Asun | | |
| 1995 | Suspiros de España y Portugal | Angelica | | |
| 1997 | Airbag | Aurora | | |
| 1998 | La niña de tus ojos | Rosa Rosales | | |
| 1999 | Todo sobre mi madre | Rosa's mother | | |
| 2001 | Anita no pierde el tren | Anita | | |
| 2001 | Sin vergüenza | Ronda | | |
| 2002 | A mi madre le gustan las mujeres | Sofía | | |
| 2015 | Ocho apellidos catalanes | Roser | | |
| 2016 | La reina de España | Rosa Rosales | | |

== Theatre ==
Her career at theatre was prolific, below some notable works:

=== Actress ===
- 1964: Los cinco minutos de Margot by Louis Verneuil. Premiered at Teatre Guimerà (Barcelona).
- 1968: Las noches bajas de Ana o mi marido tiene un turca, by Rafael Richart. At Teatre Victòria (Barcelona).
- 1976: Roses roges per a mi by Sean O'Casey
- 1976: Terra baixa by Àngel Guimerà
- 1978: Tot esperant Godot by Samuel Beckett
- 1978: Sopa de pollastre amb ordi by Arnold Wesker
- 1979: Quan la ràdio parlava de Franco by Josep Maria Benet i Jornet
- 1980: El balcó by Jean Genet
- 1982: Duet per a un sol violí by Tom Kempinski.
- 1982: Yo me bajo en la próxima, ¿y usted? by 'Adolfo Marsillach
- 1985: Mare Coratge by Bertolt Brecht
- 1992: L'hostal de la Glòria by Josep Maria de Sagarra
- 2004: Wit by Margaret Edson
- 2009: La casa de Bernarda Alba by Federico García Lorca
- 2012: Dubte by John Patrick Shanley

=== Director ===
- 1989: Ai carai, by Josep Maria Benet i Jornet
- 1994: Shirley Valentine by Willy Russell
- 1994: Fugaç by Josep Maria Bernet i Jornet
- 1996: El visitant by Eric-Emmanuel Schmitt
- 1999: Cantonada Brossa, jointly with Josep Maria Mestres, Josep Muntanyès i Lluís Pasqual. Crítica de Barcelona award

== Awards and honors ==
| Year | Award | Category | Work | Result | Ref. |
|---|---|---|---|---|---|
| 1979 | FAD Sebastià Gasch Prizes | FAD Sebastià Gasch Prize | Rosa i Maria | Won | |
| 1980 | Margarida Xirgu award | id. | Rosa i Maria & El balcó | Won | |
| 1993 | Goya Awards | Best Supporting Actress | ¿Por qué lo llaman amor cuando quieren decir sexo? | Won | |
| 1994 | Creu de Sant Jordi | id. | | Returned | |
| 1995 | Premios Ondas | Special Jury Prize as Best Host | Una hora amb Vittorio Gassman (TV) | | |
| 2001 | Goya Awards | Best Supporting Actress | Sin vergüenza | Won | |
| 2003 | Fotogramas de Plata | Best Theatre Actress | Wit | Won | |
| 2010 | Spanish Film Academy | Gold Medal | | Won | |
| 2015 | Max Awards | Honorary Award | | Won | |
| 2016 | Premios Feroz | Feroz de Honor | | Won | |
| 2016 | Gaudí Awards | Honorary Gaudí Award – Miquel Porter | | Won | |
