= Fernando Guillén (actor) =

Spanish actor (1931–2013)

The Most Excellent Fernando Guillén
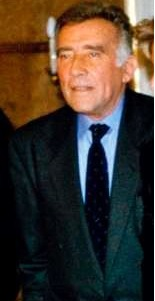
- Guillén in 1996
- Born: Fernando Guillén Gallego; 29 November 1931; Barcelona, Spain
- Died: 17 January 2013 (aged 81); Madrid, Spain
- Spouse: Gemma Cuervo
- Children: Natalia, Fernando and Cayetana

Fernando Guillén Gallego (29 November 1931 – 17 January 2013) was a Spanish actor with a long and distinguished career spanning more than five decades.

== Career ==
Guillén was born in Barcelona in 1932.

He began studies at the University of Madrid, taking part in the Spanish University theater. He eventually abandoned his studies to follow a career as an actor.

His professional career began in 1952 working with the theatrical companies of Fernando Fernán Gómez and Conchita Montes, and later in the National Theatre of Catalonia. He later formed his own theatrical company with his wife, actress Gemma Cuervo. The couple had three children, actors: Fernando and Cayetana, as well as another daughter, Natalia. They separated years later. Fernando Guillén continued to work in the theater until 2008 when, at age 75, he announced his retirement from the stage.

In addition to theater, he worked extensively in television and film, beginning in 1953 with the film Un dia perdido directed by José María Forqué. Over the next three decades he appeared in more than two dozen films, mostly in secondary roles in which his face became familiar to Spanish audiences. However, it was on television where he consolidated his career as an actor, debuting in 1958 with the adaptation of the play Nightmare by William Irish, under the direction of Juan Guerrero Zamora.

He worked regularly in the 1980s and 1990s in films like Women on the Verge of a Nervous Breakdown (1988) and All About My Mother (1999). Besides Almodovar, Guillén worked with José María Forqué, Vicente Aranda, Pedro Lazaga, Fernando Fernan Gomez, Imanol Uribe and Gonzalo Suarez, among others.

On 7 February 2008, Forges, Amparo Baró and Guillén received the Gold Medal of Merit in Labour by the Minister of Labour Jesús Caldera.

He died aged 80 following a long illness on 17 January 2013.

== Honours ==
- Gold Medal of Merit in Labour (Kingdom of Spain, 7 December 2007).
