= Everyone Off to Jail =

Todos a la cárcel
- Theatrical release poster
- Directed by: Luis García Berlanga
- Written by: Jorge Berlanga; Luis García Berlanga
- Starring: José Sazatornil; Juan Luis Galiardo; José Luis López Vázquez; Agustín González; Santiago Segura; Amparo Soler Leal
- Cinematography: Alfredo F. Mayo
- Edited by: María Elena Sáinz de Rozas; Rosario Sáinz de Rozas
- Distributed by: United International Pictures
- Release date: 22 December 1993
- Running time: 99 minutes
- Country: Spain
- Language: Spanish

Todos a la cárcel (Everyone to Jail or Everyone Off to Jail) is a 1993 Spanish comedy film directed by Luis García Berlanga. The script was written by Berlanga with his son Jorge Berlanga. The plot takes place entirely in a prison in Valencia on a day called Everyone to Jail (Todos a la cárcel), an event to reunite victims of the Francoist repression.

== Plot ==
Hoping to collect a long-overdue debt owed to him by the public administration, small-business owner Artemio Bermejo attends the International Day of the Political Prisoner, held inside Valencia Model Prison. The event is organized by Quintanilla, a shrewd man who specializes in staging large, boisterous gatherings. More political than festive, it draws the region’s leading officials, along with prominent figures from culture, finance, and the church. As Quintanilla tries to keep everything running smoothly, Artemio seizes the chance to speak with the undersecretary of culture.

Meanwhile, plans are being made outside the prison to help a jailed mobster escape: Paolo Tornicelli, an influential Italian banker who heads a complex international criminal network. The prison director is coordinating the operation, with help from another banker who is also attending the event. Each guest has their own interests and aims, though they all claim to be there out of solidarity and a desire to share a meal with people deprived of their freedom.

After a series of complications, schemes, and incidents, an unusual prison riot erupts. Tornicelli escapes, along with the prison director and his young transgender lover. A police pursuit, gunfire, and the prisoners’ detention of several guests bring the story to a close.

== Cast ==
- José Sazatornil (credited as Jose Sazatornil 'Saza') as Artemio
- José Sacristán as Quintanilla
- Agustín González as Director
- Manuel Alexandre as Modesto
- Rafael Alonso as Falangista
- Inocencio Arias as Casares
- José Luis Borau as Capellan
- José Luis López Vázquez as Padre Rebollo
- Gaspar Cano as Realizador TV
- Luis Ciges as Ludo
- Joaquín Climent as Ministro (minister)
- Marta Fernández Muro as Matilde
- Juan Luis Galiardo as Muñagorri
- Antonio Gamero as Cerrillo
- Chus Lampreave as Chus
- Eusebio Lázaro as Alcaraz

== Production ==
Released on 22 December 1993, the film features one of Santiago Segura’s earliest acting appearances, in which he plays an environmental activist.

Fashion designer David Delfín, credited under his real name, David Domínguez, plays Vanessa, a transgender woman and the prison director’s (Agustín González) girlfriend.

In an interview with El País, director Luis García Berlanga described Everyone to Jail as his most libertarian film, and perhaps also his cruelest and most corrosive.

== Accolades ==
It won at the 1993 Goya Awards, 'Best Director', 'Best Film' and 'Best Sound'.
