= Kika (1993 film) =

- Theatrical release poster
- Directed by: Pedro Almodóvar
- Written by: Pedro Almodóvar
- Produced by: Agustín Almodóvar
- Starring: Verónica Forqué; Peter Coyote; Victoria Abril
- Cinematography: Alfredo Mayo
- Edited by: José Salcedo
- Production companies: El Deseo; Ciby 2000
- Distributed by: Warner Española S.A. (Spain); UGC PH (France)
- Release dates: 29 October 1993 (Spain); 19 January 1994 (France)
- Running time: 114 minutes
- Countries: Spain; France
- Language: Spanish
- Box office: $2 million

Kika is a 1993 black comedy film written and directed by Pedro Almodóvar and starring Verónica Forqué as the title character. Forqué won the Goya Award for Best Actress, the second female lead on an Almodóvar film to do so.

== Plot ==
Kika, a naïve make-up artist, recalls how she met her lover Ramón. She had given her phone number to his stepfather, American writer Nicholas Pierce, and he had called her not for sex as she had hoped, but to make up the younger man's corpse. He was, however, merely catatonic and suddenly awoke. Ramón is a fashion photographer with voyeuristic tendencies who was traumatised by his mother's suicide after several attempts. He lets Nicholas, who has returned to Madrid, live above their flat and the two discuss whether to sell the family home outside of town, Casa Youkali, which they jointly own. Ramón proposes to Kika, who accepts but feels conflicted as she has been cheating on him with Nicholas.

Nicholas is working on a novel about a lesbian serial killer, but he makes ends meet by freelancing discreetly for an outrageously exploitative television show which focuses on bizarre and macabre events. The show is devised and presented by Andrea Caracortada ("Andrea Scarface"), who wears over-the-top outfits and a persona to match. Andrea used to be a psychologist, and Ramón was once her patient, then her lover. He tells Nicholas that she scarred her own face when he left her and she is now stalking him.

While Ramon and Kika have difficulties having sex, she overhears from Nicolas's flat how Susana Bibiana Fernández, a Mexican transexual ex-girlfriend of Nicolas, is singing a Chavela Vargas song to him before resuming their passionate sex.

On her show, Andrea reports that Paul Bazzo (real name: Pablo Mendez), a dim-witted sex maniac and former pornographic actor jailed for rapes, has escaped while attending a religious procession. He turns up at Ramón and Kika's flat because their maid Juana is his long-suffering sister. Juana instructs him to tie her up, knock her unconscious and steal valuables, then hide at a cousin's place. Paul, however, finds Kika napping and rapes her at knife point. An unseen voyeur peeping at Kika's room notifies the police and two incompetent inspectors eventually arrive, shoot up the door and with great difficulty interrupt the rape. Paul escapes and bumps into Andrea, kitted out in a futuristic reporter's outfit complete with helmet-mounted video camera. She asks for an interview, but he pushes her off and steals her motorcycle. She then enters the flat and harasses Kika. The police are puzzled at her presence, because although they often tip her off, they did not in this case. Andrea credits an unknown peeping tom for alerting her and broadcasts video footage of the rape on her show, causing Kika to break down.

In the aftermath, Kika finds Ramón to be no help and she overhears him confess to Nicholas that it was he who called the police: he liked to peep on her from his photographic studio's window. She leaves him in silence, as does a guilt-ridden Juana who confesses her part in the rape. Ramón also tells Nicholas that he has held on to his mother's diaries but never found the strength to read them. He does so, however, after Nicholas has moved back to Casa Youkali, and discovers that the farewell letter to him that Nicholas had passed on was actually ripped from an old entry. Ramón confronts Nicholas and accuses him of murdering his mother.

Meanwhile, it turns out that Andrea and Ramón both spied on the flat from separate addresses. While reviewing footage of the upper floor, Andrea realises that Nicholas appears to have murdered Susana, when she visited him. Connecting this to his latest book, she also goes to Casa Youkali armed with a pistol and finds a freshly dug grave in the garden. Nicholas barricades himself, but she breaks in aggressively and offers to interview him and let him run away before the broadcast. They fight and shoot each other. Kika also appears and Nicholas confesses with his dying breath that his novel about a lesbian serial killer is actually a disguised autobiography, as Andrea had figured out. Kika also finds the bodies of Andrea, Susana and Ramón, but she manages to resurrect the latter a second time with electric shocks. Ramón had gone into shock after finding Susana's body in the bathroom.

While Ramón is taken to hospital, Kika picks up a stranded driver and takes an instant interest in him, stating that she might need a new direction.

== Cast ==
- Verónica Forqué as Kika
- Peter Coyote as Nicholas Pierce
- Victoria Abril as Andrea Caracortada
- Álex Casanovas as Ramón
- Rossy de Palma as Juana
- Santiago Lajusticia as Pablo Mendez/Paul Bazzo
- Anabel Alonso as Amparo
- Bibiana Fernández as Susana
- Jesús Bonilla as a policeman
- Karra Elejalde as a policeman
- Manuel Bandera as Chico Carretera
- Charo López as Rafaela
- Francisca Caballero as Doña Paquita
- Mónica Bardem as Paca
- Joaquín Climent as a murderer
- Blanca Li as a victim

== Music ==
Perez Prado's "Concierto para Bongó" serves as background music for some scenes, including the Picao's self-flagellation scenes, a car chase and Kika's rape scene (when replayed in television by Andrea). Tite Curet Alonso's song "Teatro", as sung by La Lupe, is the film's musical theme.

== Themes ==
The film central themes are depravity and hope, and it has a corrosive humor.

The film comments on the intrusive nature of reality television which was a relatively new phenomenon at the time.

== Reception ==
Response to the film was mixed; some called it Almodóvar's most intense and surprising work to date.

The film has a score of 59% on Rotten Tomatoes from 17 reviews. Metacritic, which uses a weighted average, assigned the film a score of 53 out of 100, based on 15 critics, indicating "mixed or average" reviews.

John Hartl of The Seattle Times gave a positive review, commenting that for the first time in years, Almodóvar "has a satirical target worthy of his jabs: television tabloid shows that specialize in invasion of privacy". He also said, "'Kika' is far from perfect. Almodovar lets the joke run on too long (nearly two hours), and he spends too much time with the mild Kika. The driving force of the movie is Abril's relentlessly exploitative media monster."

In contrast, the Seattle Post-Intelligencer listed it as one of the 10 worst films of 1994.
