= Ángel Fernández-Santos =

Spanish film critic and screenwriter

Ángel Fernández-Santos (1934–2004) was a Spanish film critic and screenwriter.

Born in Los Cerralbos, province of Toledo, in 1934, he was the younger brother of Marxist philosopher Francisco Fernández-Santos. He studied for a brief spell at the Escuela Oficial de Cine in the early 1960s. As a committed anti-Francoist, he was expelled from the Escuela Oficial de Cine because of his left-wing positions.

He went on to have an extensive career as a film critic, writing for Nuestro cine (1964–1971), Cinemanía, Diario 16, and El País, where he worked from 1982 until his death. He also co-penned the screenplays of The Spirit of the Beehive (reputed to be among the best Spanish films ever) and also screenplays of films directed by Escuela Oficial de Cine acquaintance Francisco Regueiro.

He died in Madrid on 6 July 2004.

A compilation of his reviews edited by Carlos F. Heredero for Editorial Debate was published in 2007. An essay by José Antonio Planes Pedreño about the basics of Fernández-Santos' film criticism titled La crítica cinematográfica de Ángel Fernández-Santos was published by Shangrila Ediciones in 2017. His daughter Elsa is a journalist specialised in culture, reporting about cinema as well.
