= List of Spanish films of 1994 =

A list of Spanish-produced and co-produced feature films released in Spain in 1994.

== Films ==
Release		Title (Domestic title)	Cast & Crew	Ref.
J A N U A R Y	14	Historias de la puta mili	Director: Manuel Esteban Marquilles Cast: Juan Echanove, Jordi Mollá, Agustín González	
J A N U A R Y	14	El baile de las ánimas	Director: Pedro Carvajal Cast: Ángela Molina, Mónica Molina, Dorotea Bárcena, Joaquim de Almeida	
J A N U A R Y	21	Una chica entre un millón	Director: Álvaro Sáenz de Heredia Cast: Juanjo Puigcorbé, Esperanza Campuzano, José Coronado	
F E B R U A R Y	10	Cómo ser infeliz y disfrutarlo	Director: Enrique Urbizu Cast: Carmen Maura, Alicia Agut, Asunción Balaguer, Pilar Bardem, Irene Bau, Francis Lorenzo, Ramón Madaula, Fernando Valverde, El Gran Wyoming, Antonio Resines	
F E B R U A R Y	25	All Men Are the Same (Todos los hombres sois iguales)	Director: Manuel Gómez Pereira Cast: Imanol Arias, Antonio Resines, Juanjo Puigcorbé, Cristina Marcos, María Barranco, Pastora Vega, Kiti Manver	
F E B R U A R Y	25	On the Far Side of the Tunnel (Al otro lado del túnel)	Director: Jaime de Armiñán Cast: Fernando Rey, Maribel Verdú, Gonzalo Vega, Amparo Baró, Rafael Alonso	
A P R I L	15	Alegre ma non troppo	Director: Fernando Colomo Cast: Penélope Cruz, Pere Ponce, Rosa María Sardá, Óscar Ladoire, Andoni Gracia, Nathalie Seseña, Jordi Mollà	
A P R I L	15	Cradle Song (Canción de cuna)	Director: José Luis Garci Cast: Fiorella Faltoyano, Amparo Larrañaga, María Massip, Virginia Mataix, María Luisa Ponte, Diana Peñalver, Maribel Verdú, Carmelo Gómez, Alfredo Landa	
A P R I L	15	El cianuro... ¿solo o con leche?	Director: José Miguel Ganga Cast: José Coronado, Maribel Verdú, Rosa María Sardá, Carmen Conesa, Fernando Rey	
A P R I L	29	Cautivos de la sombra	Director: Javier Elorrieta Cast: Manuel Bandera, Beatriz Santana, Juan Ribó, Neus Asensi, Antonio Flores, Aramis Ney	
J U L Y	22	Shortcut to Paradise (Desvío al paraíso)	Director: Gerardo Herrero Cast: Charles Dance, Assumpta Serna, Morgan Weisser, Katrina Gibson, Gladys Rodríguez, Axel Anderson	
A U G U S T	19	¡Por fin solos!	Director: Antonio del Real Cast: Alfredo Landa, María José Alfonso, Amparo Larrañaga, Juan José Artero, Ayanta Barilli, Luis Merlo, Tomás Martín, Juan Luis Galiardo	
A U G U S T	26	Sexo oral	Director: Chus Gutiérrez	
S E P T E M B E R	9	The Worst Years of Our Lives (Los peores años de nuestra vida)	Director: Emilio Martínez Lázaro Cast: Gabino Diego, Ariadna Gil, Jorge Sanz, Agustín González, Maite Blasco, Jesús Bonilla, Carmen Elías, Ayanta Barilli	
S E P T E M B E R	23	Amor propio	Director: Mario Camus Cast: Verónica Forqué, Antonio Resines, Fernando Valverde, Anabel Alonso, Antonio Valero	
S E P T E M B E R	30	The Detective and Death (El detective y la muerte)	Director: Gonzalo Suárez Cast: Javier Bardem, Carmelo Gómez, Maria de Medeiros, Héctor Alterio, Charo López, Mapi Galán, Francis Lorenzo	
O C T O B E R	7	Running Out of Time (Días contados)	Director: Imanol Uribe Cast: Carmelo Gómez, Ruth Gabriel, Candela Peña, Karra Elejalde, Elvira Mínguez, Javier Bardem	
O C T O B E R	7	The Tit and the Moon (La teta y la luna)	Director: Bigas Luna Cast: Biel Durán, Mathilda May, Gérard Darmon, Miguel Poveda, Abel Folk, Laura Mañá	
O C T O B E R	14	It's All Lies (Todo es mentira)	Director: Álvaro Fernández Armero Cast: Penélope Cruz, Coque Malla, Jordi Mollá, Cristina Rossenvinge, Gustavo Salmerón, Irene Bau, Fernando Colomo, Mónica López, Ariadna Gil	
N O V E M B E R	4	Souvenir	Director: Rosa Vergés Cast: Futoshi Kasagawa, Emma Suárez, Anna Lizaran, Pepa López, Eulàlia Ramon, Mercè Pons, Emilio Gutiérrez Caba, Simon Andreu, Enric Majó, Sei Watanabe	
N O V E M B E R	25	Dame lume	Director: Héctor Carré Cast: Camilo Rodríguez, Ana Otero, Beatriz Bergamín, Mercedes Sampietro, Juanjo Menéndez, Rodrigo Roel, Evaristo Calvo, Carles Sans, Nancho Novo	
D E C E M B E R	16	The Turkish Passion (La pasión turca)	Director: Vicente Aranda Cast: Ana Belén, Georges Corraface, Ramón Madaula, Sílvia Munt, Blanca Apilánez, Francis Lorenzo, Helio Pedregal, Loles León	

== Box office ==
The five highest-grossing Spanish films in 1994, by in-year domestic box office gross revenue, are as follows:

Highest-grossing films of 1994
Rank	Title	Admissions	Domestic gross (₧)
1	All Men Are the Same (Todos los hombres sois iguales)	831,590	410,796,981
2	The Worst Years of Our Lives (Los peores años de nuestra vida)	605,487	310,106,617
3	¡Por fin solos!	598,076	295,092,454
4	Historias de la puta mili	560,153	263,423,555
5	The Turkish Passion (La pasión turca)	343,869	186,623,572
6	Everyone Off to Jail (Todos a la cárcel)	320,124	154,782,048
7	It's All Lies (Todo es mentira)	301,244	154,151,553
8	Running Out of Time (Días contados)	191,947	102,527,403
9	Alegre ma non troppo	201,672	100,538,707
10	Cradle Song (Canción de cuna)	188,162	94,999,871

== See also ==
- 9th Goya Awards
- 1994 in film
