= 9th Goya Awards =

- Date: 20 January 1995
- Site: Palacio de Congresos de Madrid
- Hosted by: Imanol Arias

Highlights
- Best Film: Running Out of Time
- Best Actor: Carmelo Gómez; Running Out of Time
- Best Actress: Cristina Marcos; All Men Are the Same
- Most awards: Running Out of Time (8)
- Most nominations: Running Out of Time (19)

Television coverage
- Network: TVE

The 9th Goya Awards were presented in Madrid, Spain on 20 January 1995.

Running Out of Time won the award for Best Film.

== Winners and nominees ==
The nominees and winners are listed as follows:

=== Major award nominees ===
Best Film: Running Out of Time; Cradle Song; Turkish Passion	Best Director: Imanol Uribe – Running Out of Time; Vicente Aranda – Turkish Passion; José Luis Garci – Cradle Song
Best Actor: Carmelo Gómez – Running Out of Time; Gabino Diego – The Worst Years of Our Lives; Alfredo Landa – Cradle Song	Best Actress: Cristina Marcos – All Men Are the Same; Ana Belén – Turkish Passion; Ruth Gabriel – Running Out of Time
Best Supporting Actor: Javier Bardem – Running Out of Time; Agustín González – The Worst Years of Our Lives; Óscar Ladoire – Alegre ma non troppo	Best Supporting Actress: María Luisa Ponte – Cradle Song; Sílvia Munt – Turkish Passion; Candela Peña – Running Out of Time
Best Original Screenplay: All Men Are the Same – Joaquín Oristrell, Yolanda García Serrano, Juan Luis Iborra, Manuel Gómez Pereira; The Detective and Death – Gonzalo Suárez; The Worst Years of Our Lives – David Trueba	Best Adapted Screenplay: Running Out of Time – Imanol Uribe; Cradle Song – José Luis Garci and Horacio Valcárcel; Turkish Passion – Vicente Aranda
Best New Actor: Saturnino García – Justino, a Senior Citizen Killer; Pepón Nieto – Running Out of Time; Coque Malla – It's All Lies	Best New Actress: Ruth Gabriel – Running Out of Time; Elvira Mínguez – Running Out of Time; Candela Peña – Running Out of Time
Best Spanish Language Foreign Film: Strawberry and Chocolate • Cuba; The Snail's Strategy • Colombia; Without Compassion • Peru	Best European Film: The Snapper • UK; Raining Stones • UK; The Remains of the Day • UK
Best New Director: Luis Guridi, Santiago Aguilar – Justino, a Senior Citizen Killer; Héctor Carré – Burn Me; Álvaro Fernández Armero – It's All Lies	Best Animated Film: El regreso del viento del Norte

=== Other award nominees ===
Best Cinematography: Cradle Song – Manuel Rojas; Running Out of Time – Javier Aguirresarobe; Turkish Passion – José Luis Alcaine	Best Editing: Running Out of Time – Teresa Font; Cradle Song – Miguel González Sinde; The Detective and Death – José Salcedo
Best Art Direction: Cradle Song – Gil Parrondo; Running Out of Time – Félix Murcia; Turkish Passion – Josep Rosell	Best Production Supervision: Turkish Passion – José Luis Escolar; Running Out of Time – Andrés Santana; The Detective and Death – José Luis García Arrojo
Best Sound: The Worst Years of Our Lives – Carlos Garrido, Gilles Ortion José Antonio Bermúdez, Polo Aledo; Running Out of Time – Gilles Ortion, John Hayward; Turkish Passion – Ricard Casals, Gilles Ortion	Best Special Effects: Running Out of Time – Reyes Abades; The Detective and Death – Miroslaw Marchwinski; Shortcut to Paradise – Michael Kirton
Best Costume Design: Cradle Song – Yvonne Blake; Running Out of Time – Helena Sanchís; Turkish Passion – Nereida Bonmatí	Best Makeup and Hairstyles: Cradle Song – Paquita Núñez, José Antonio Sánchez; Running Out of Time – Romana González, Josefa Morales; Turkish Passion – Juan Pedro Hernández, Manolo Carretero
Best Fictional Short Film: Aquel ritmillo; Sangre ciega; Se paga al acto	Best Animated Short Film: El sueño de Adán; Arturo Gámez (cuerpos en tránsito)
Best Original Score: Turkish Passion – José Nieto; Cradle Song – Manuel Balboa; The Detective and Death – Suso Sáiz

== Honorary Goya ==
- José María Forqué (director and screenwriter)
