= Goya Award for Best Supporting Actor =

Annual award by the Spanish Film Academy

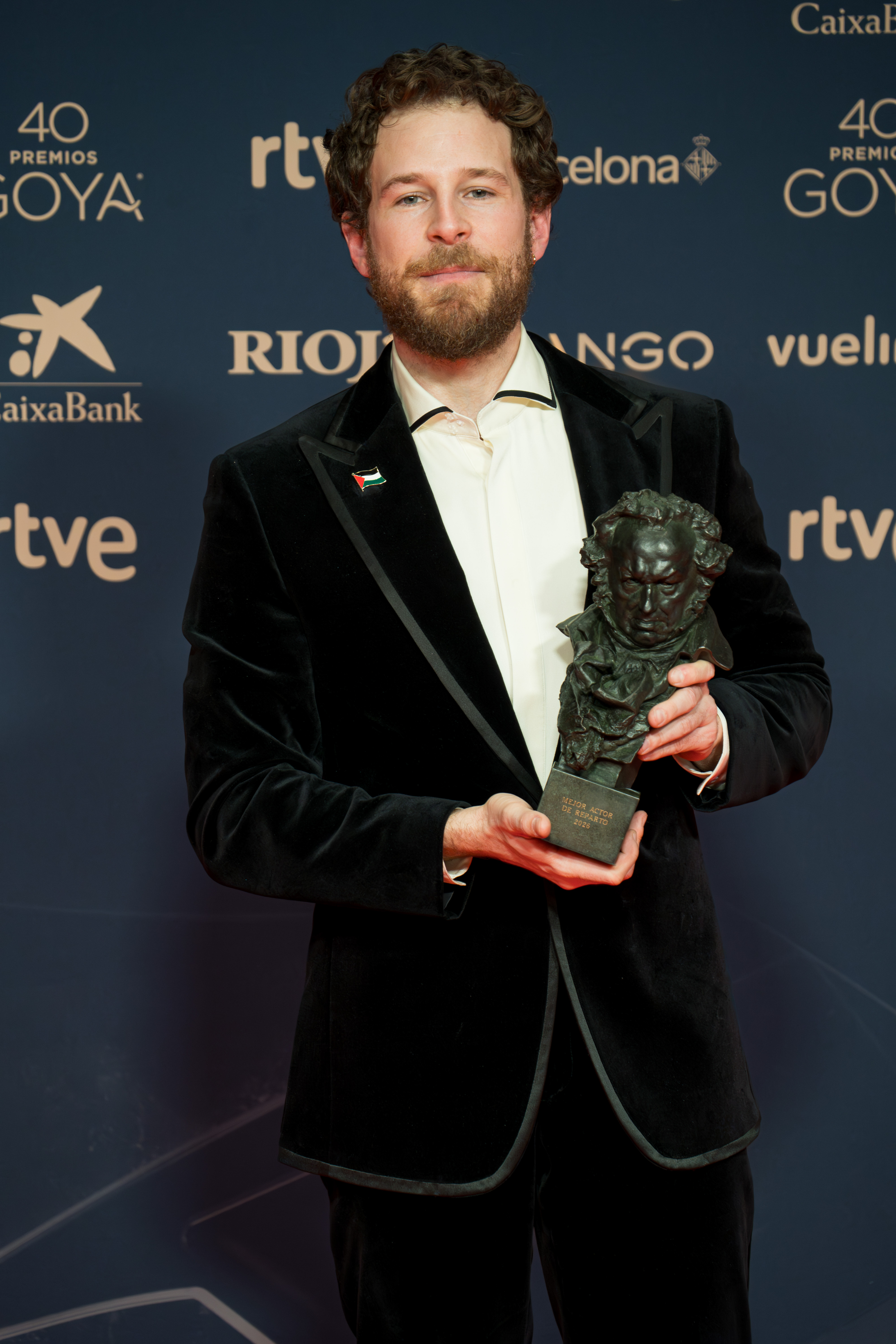
- The 2026 recipient: Álvaro Cervantes
- Native name: Premio Goya a la mejor interpretación masculina de reparto
- Awarded for: Best performance by an actor in a supporting role in a Spanish film of the year
- Country: Spain
- Presented by: Academy of Cinematographic Arts and Sciences of Spain (AACCE)
- First award: 1st Goya Awards (1986)
- Most recent winner: Álvaro Cervantes; Deaf (2025)
- Website: Official website

The Goya Award for Best Supporting Actor (Spanish: Premio Goya a la mejor interpretación masculina de reparto) is one of the Goya Awards presented annually by the Academy of Cinematographic Arts and Sciences of Spain (AACCE) since the awards debuted in 1986. It is given in honor of an actor who has delivered an outstanding supporting performance in a Spanish film.

== History ==
Miguel Rellán was the first winner of this category for his performance as Alberto Goicoechea in Dear Nanny.

Actors Juan Diego, Eduard Fernández, Karra Elejalde, Emilio Gutiérrez Caba and Luis Zahera hold the record for most wins in this category with two victories each. Antonio de la Torre has received the most nominations for this award with seven, followed by Juan Diego and Eduard Fernández, both with six each, and Juan Echanove with five.

Actors that won or were nominated for this category have appeared in film festivals such as the San Sebastián International Film Festival, where Javier Bardem (Running Out of Time) and Javier Cámara (Truman) have received the Silver Shell for Best Actor. Luis Zahera and Diego Anido shared the Silver Hugo for Best Ensemble Performance at the Chicago International Film Festival with the rest of the cast of The Beasts.

As of the 2026 ceremony, Álvaro Cervantes is the most recent winner in this category for his role as Héctor in Deaf.

== Winners and nominees ==
In the list below the winner of the award for each year is shown first, followed by the other nominees.

Table key
‡	Indicates the winner

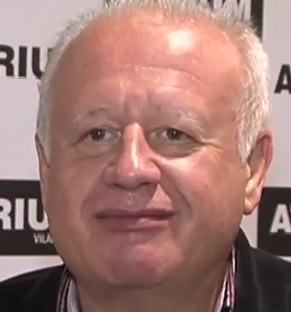
Juan Echanove won for Divinas palabras in 1987.

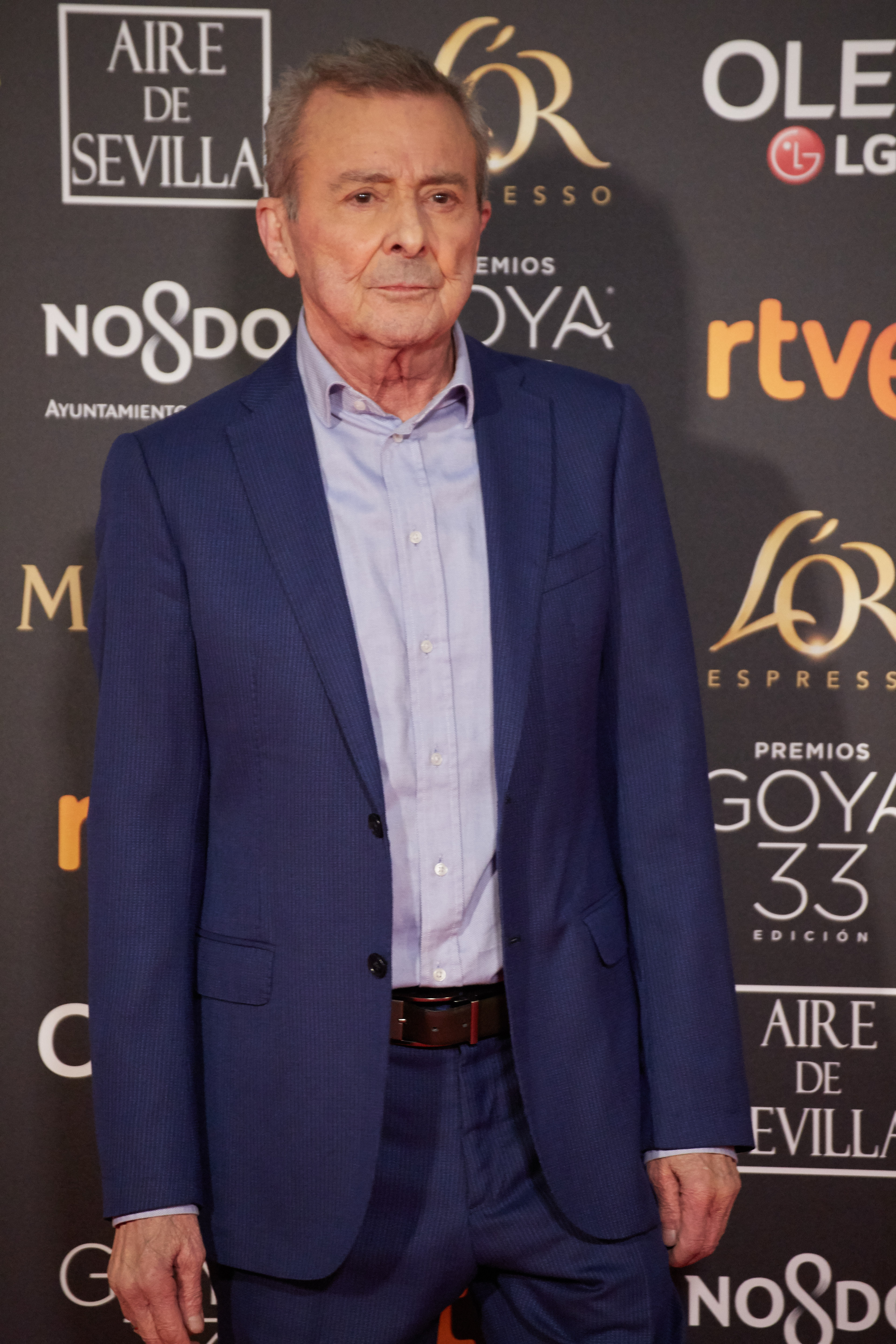
Juan Diego has received this award twice, for The Dumbfounded King in 1991 and París-Tombuctú in 1999.

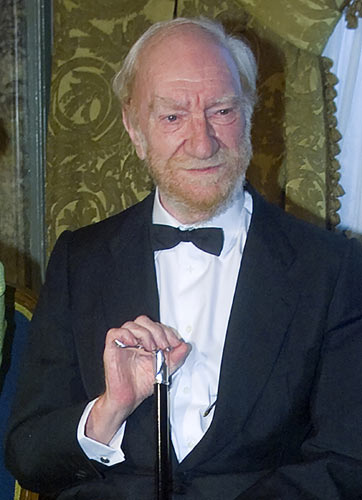
Fernando Fernán Gómez won for Belle Époque in 1992.

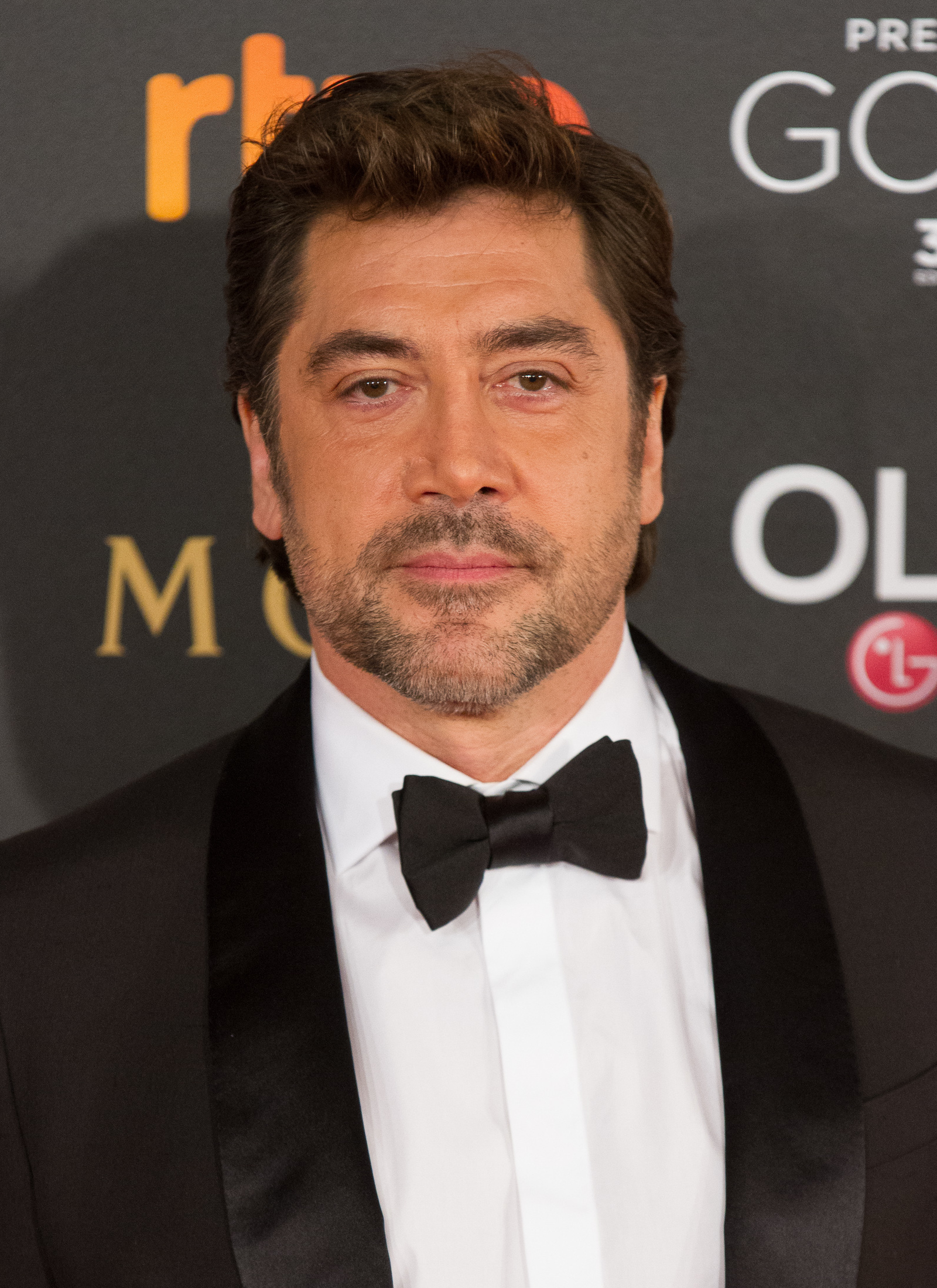
Javier Bardem won for Running Out of Time in 1994.

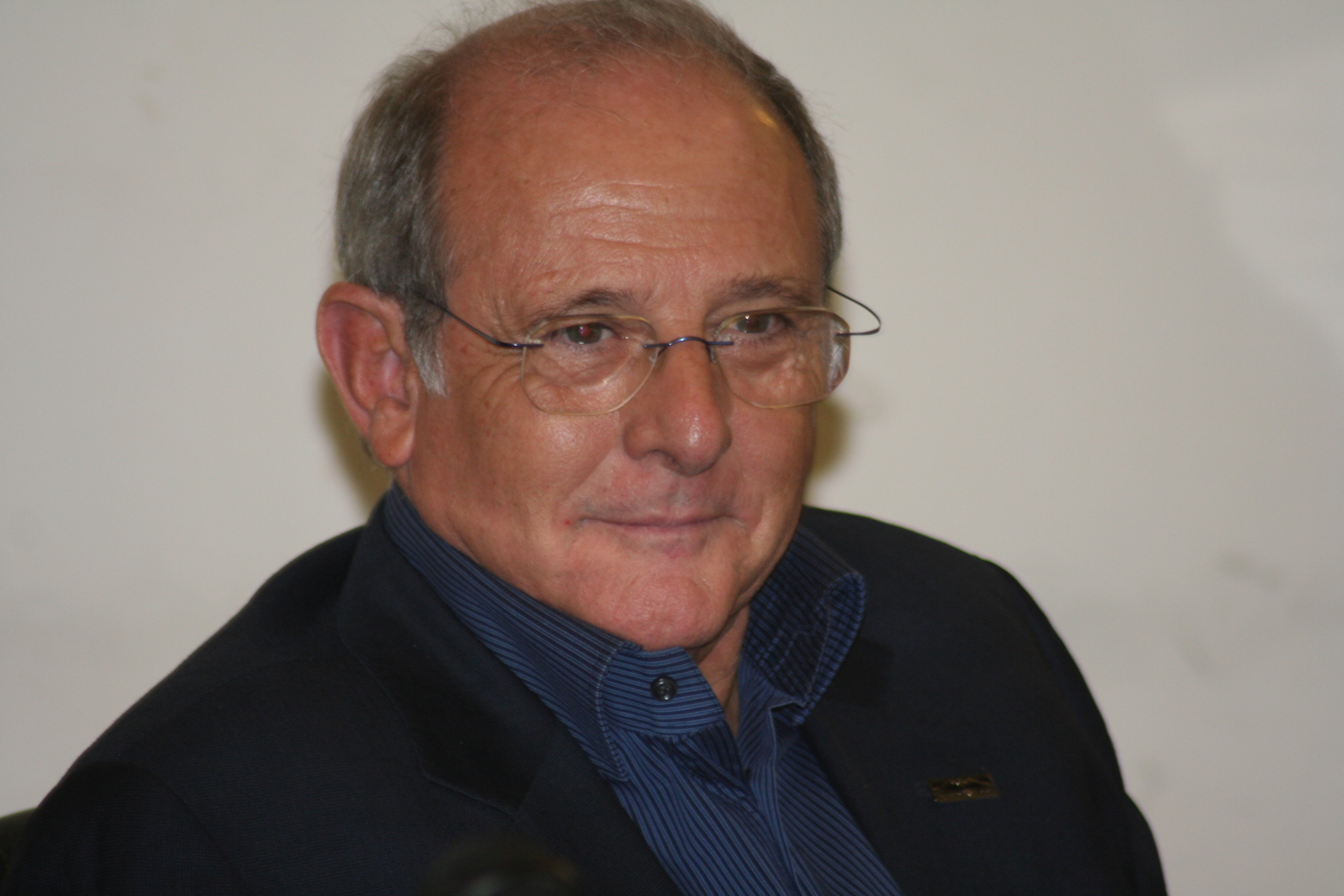
Emilio Gutiérrez Caba has received this award twice, for Common Wealth in 2000 and Ten Days Without Love in 2001.

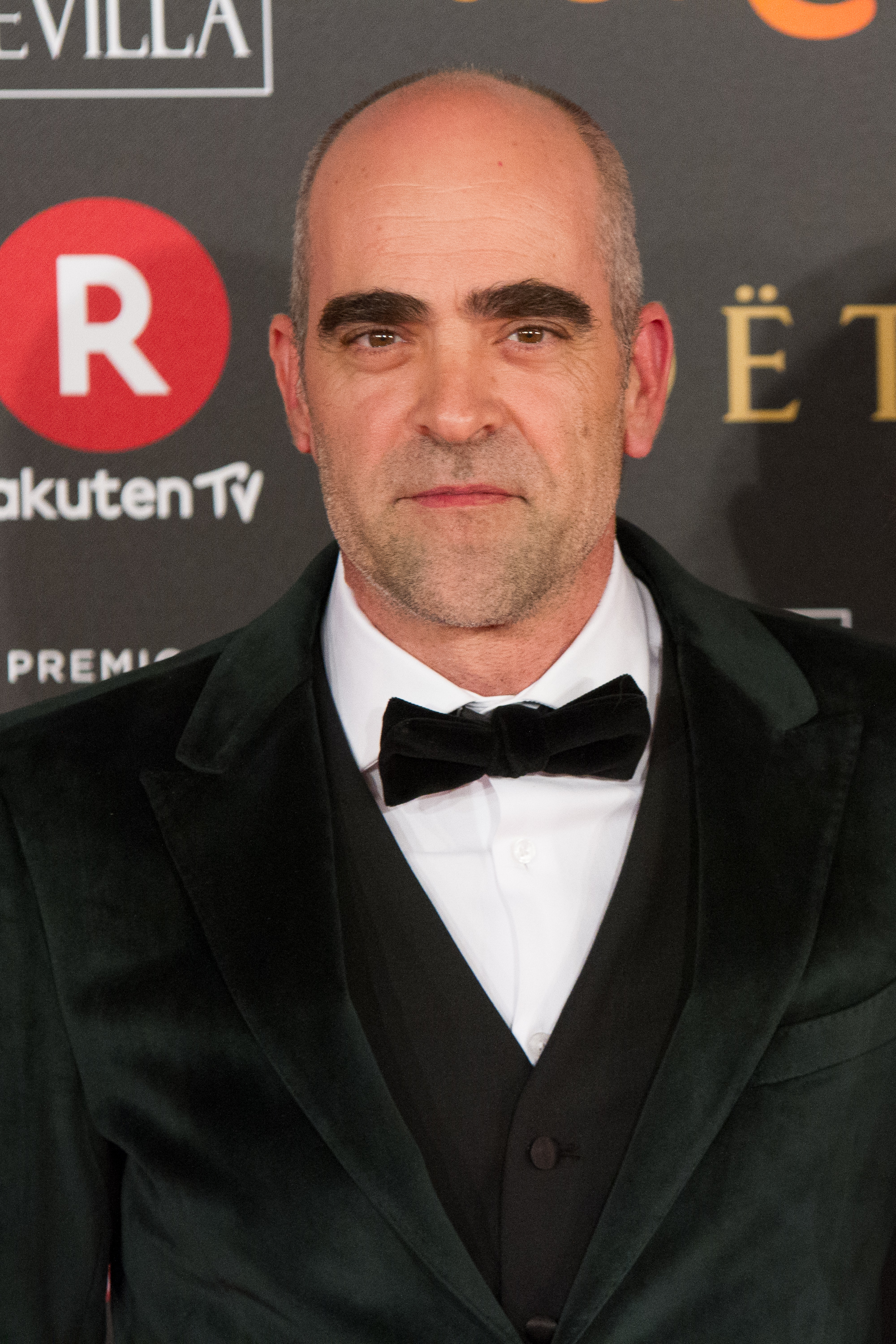
Luis Tosar won for Mondays in the Sun in 2002.

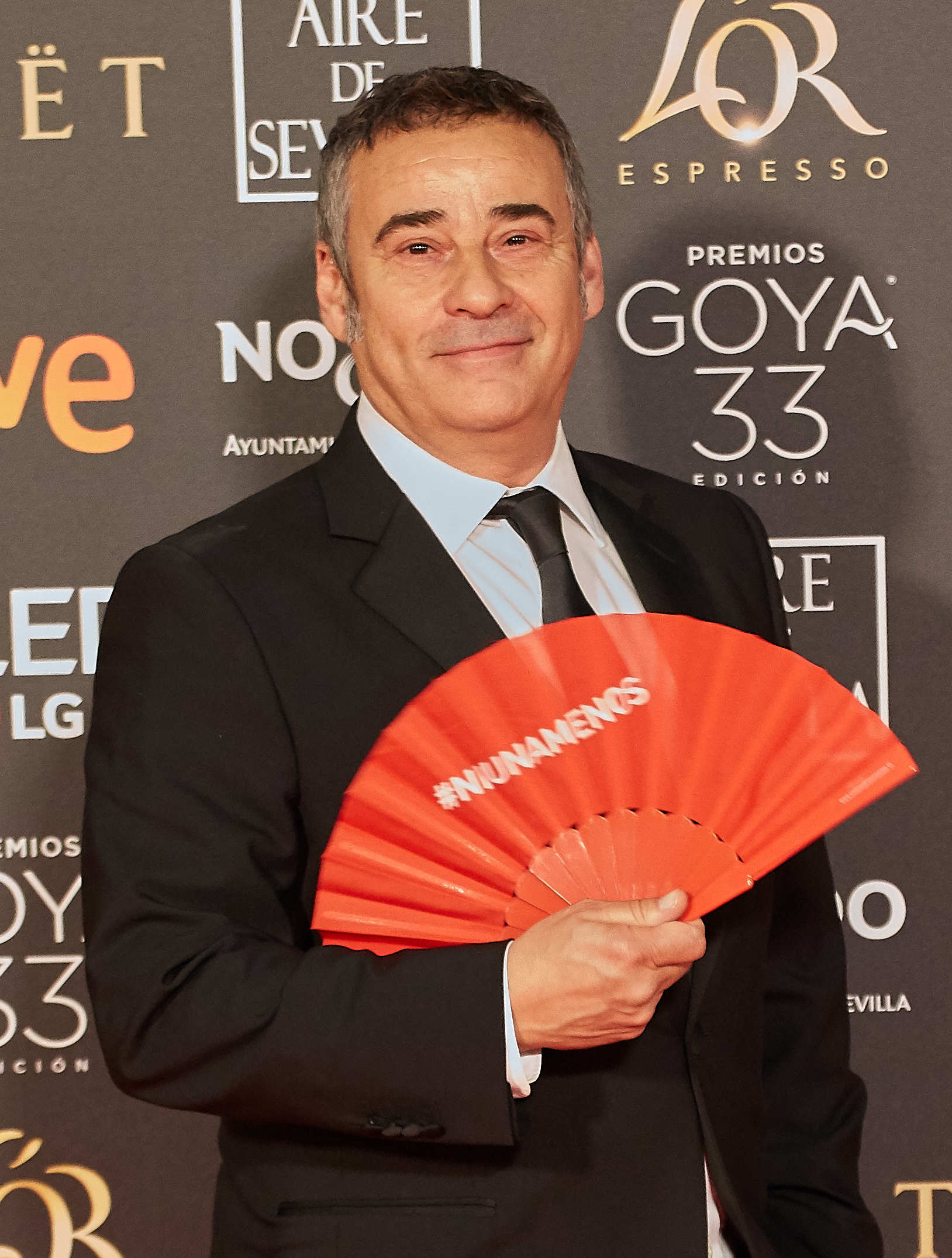
Eduard Fernández has won this award twice, for In the City in 2003 and While at War in 2019.

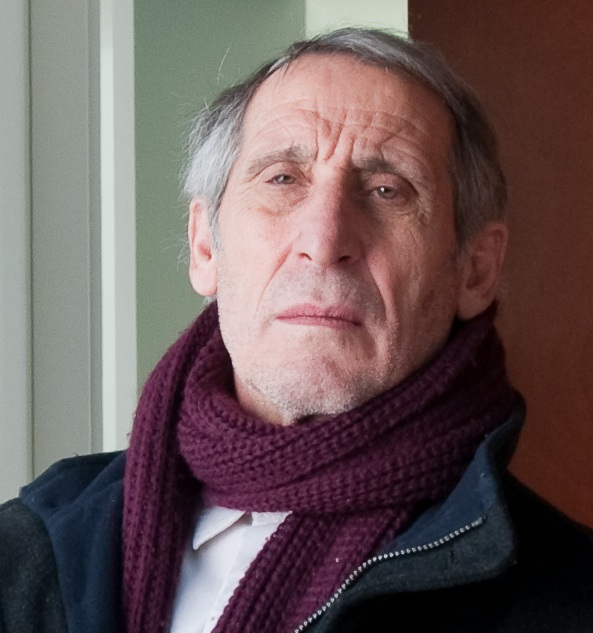
Celso Bugallo won for The Sea Inside in 2004.

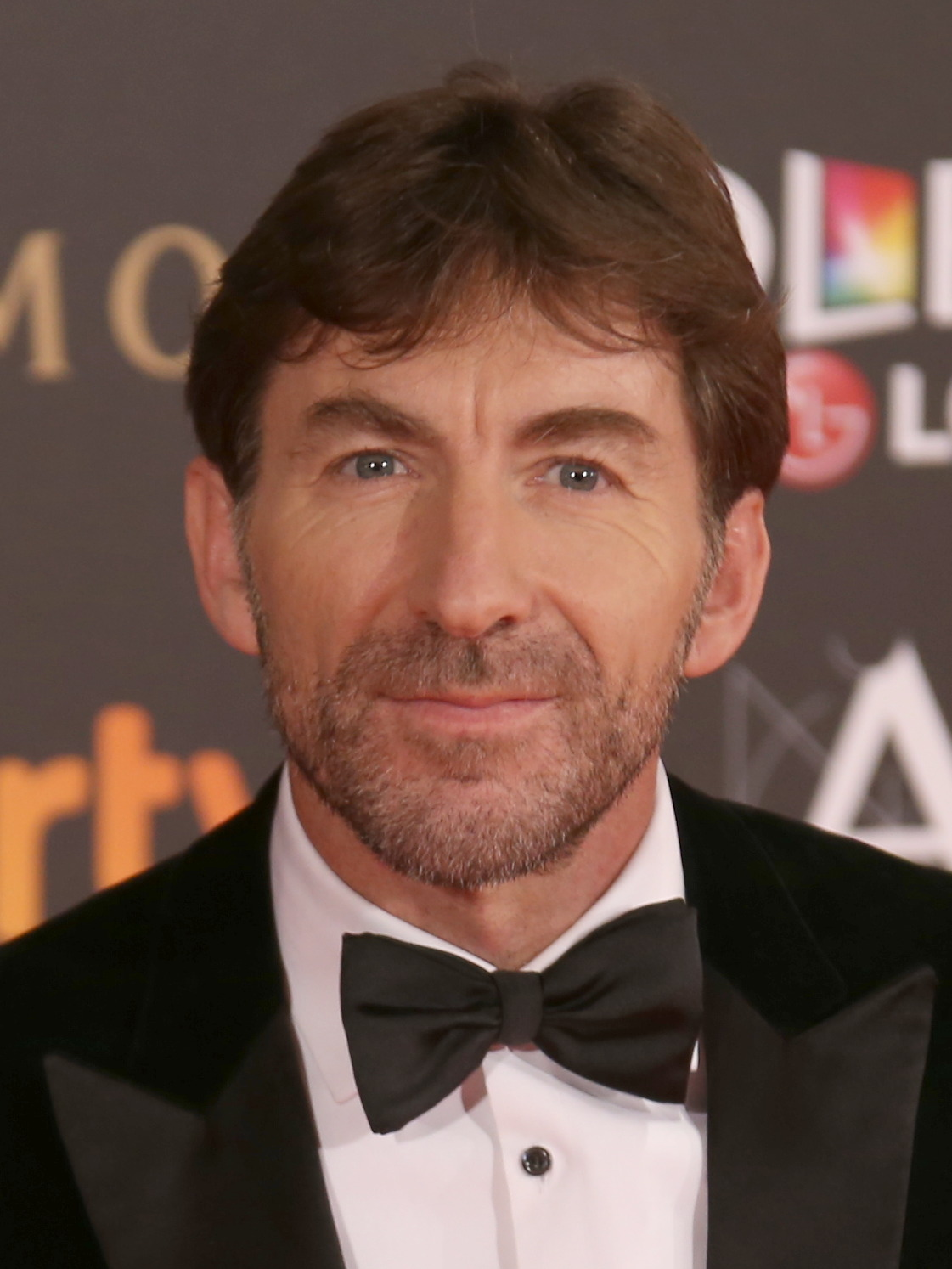
Antonio de la Torre won for DarkBlueAlmostBlack in 2006.

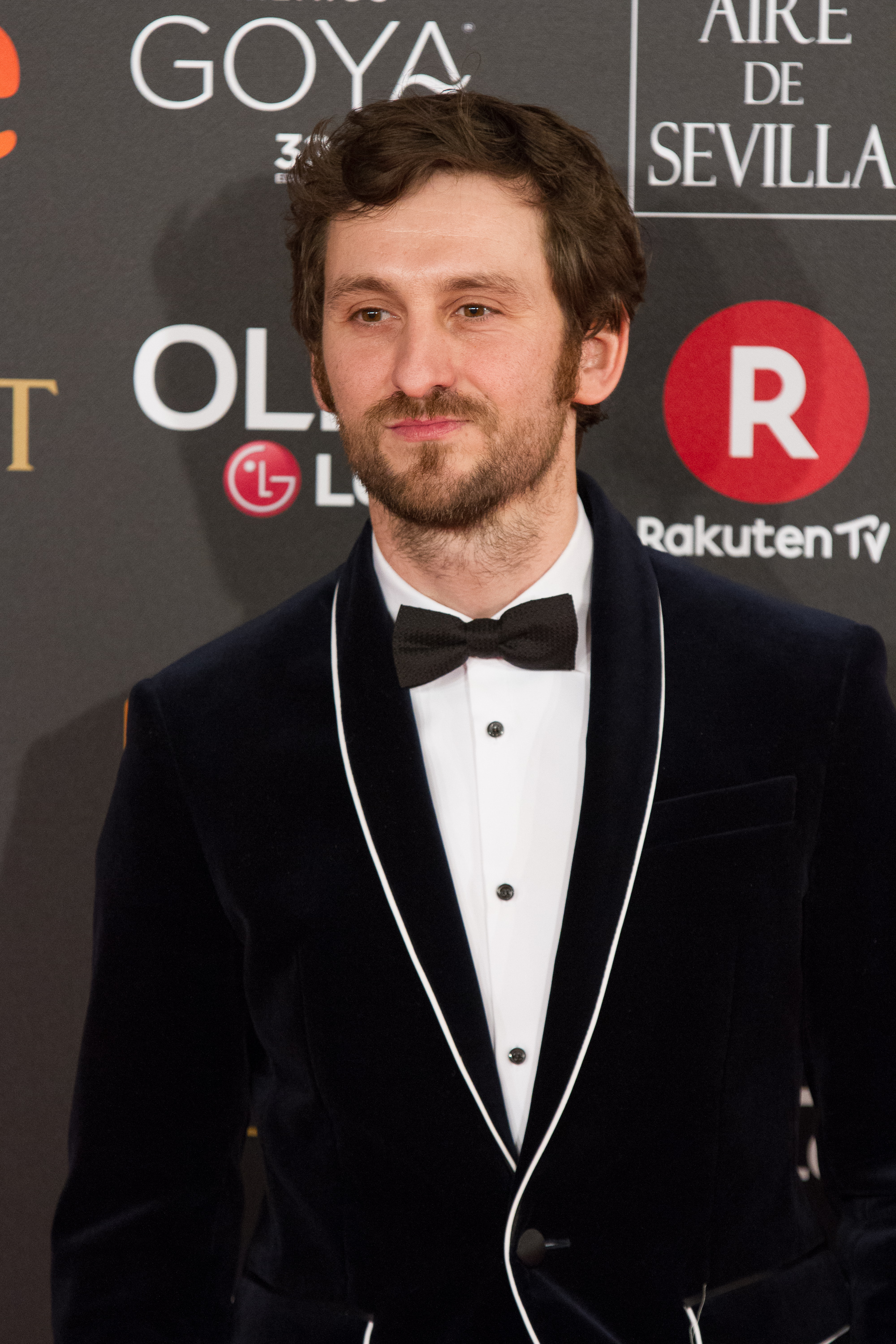
Raúl Arévalo won for Fat People in 2009.

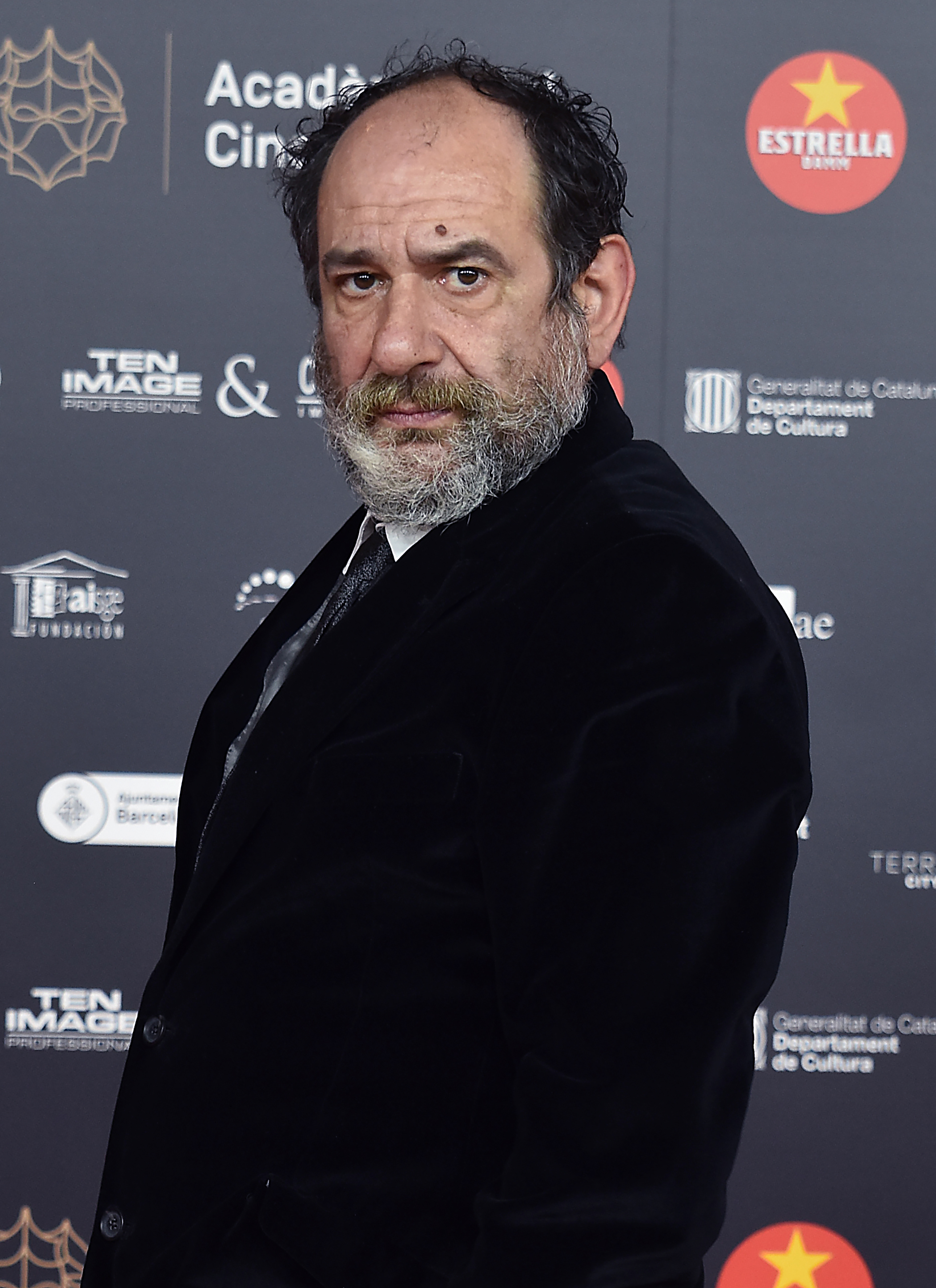
Karra Elejalde has won this award twice, for Even the Rain in 2010 and Spanish Affair in 2014.

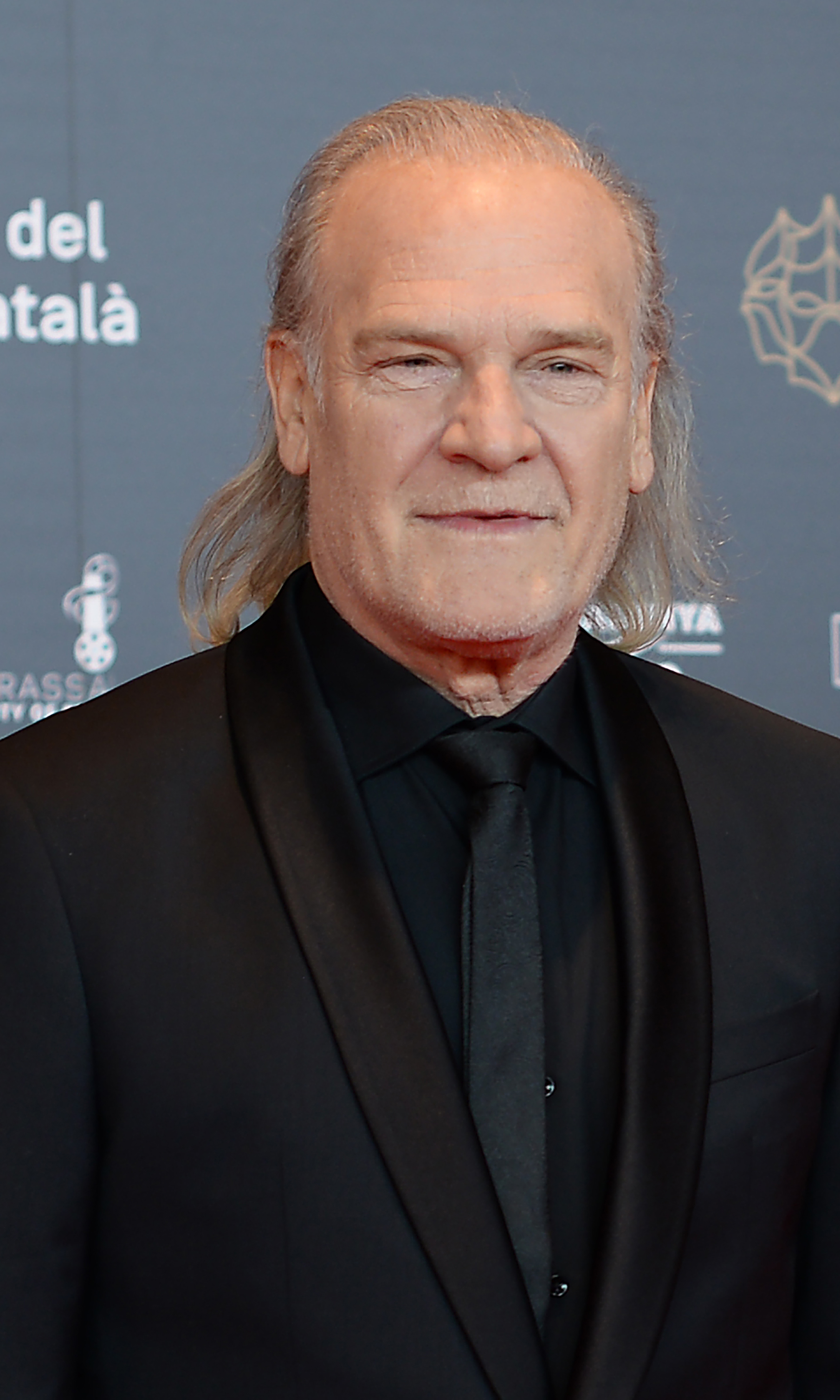
Lluís Homar won for Eva in 2011.

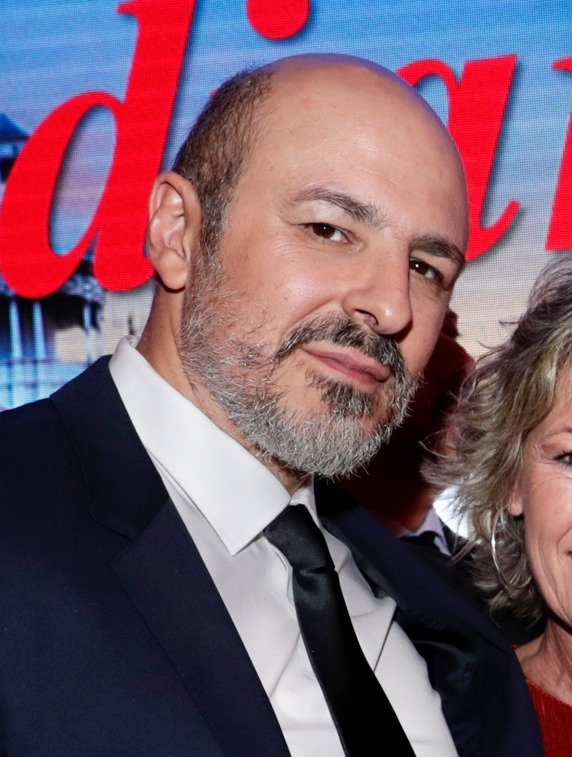
Roberto Álamo won for Family United in 2013.

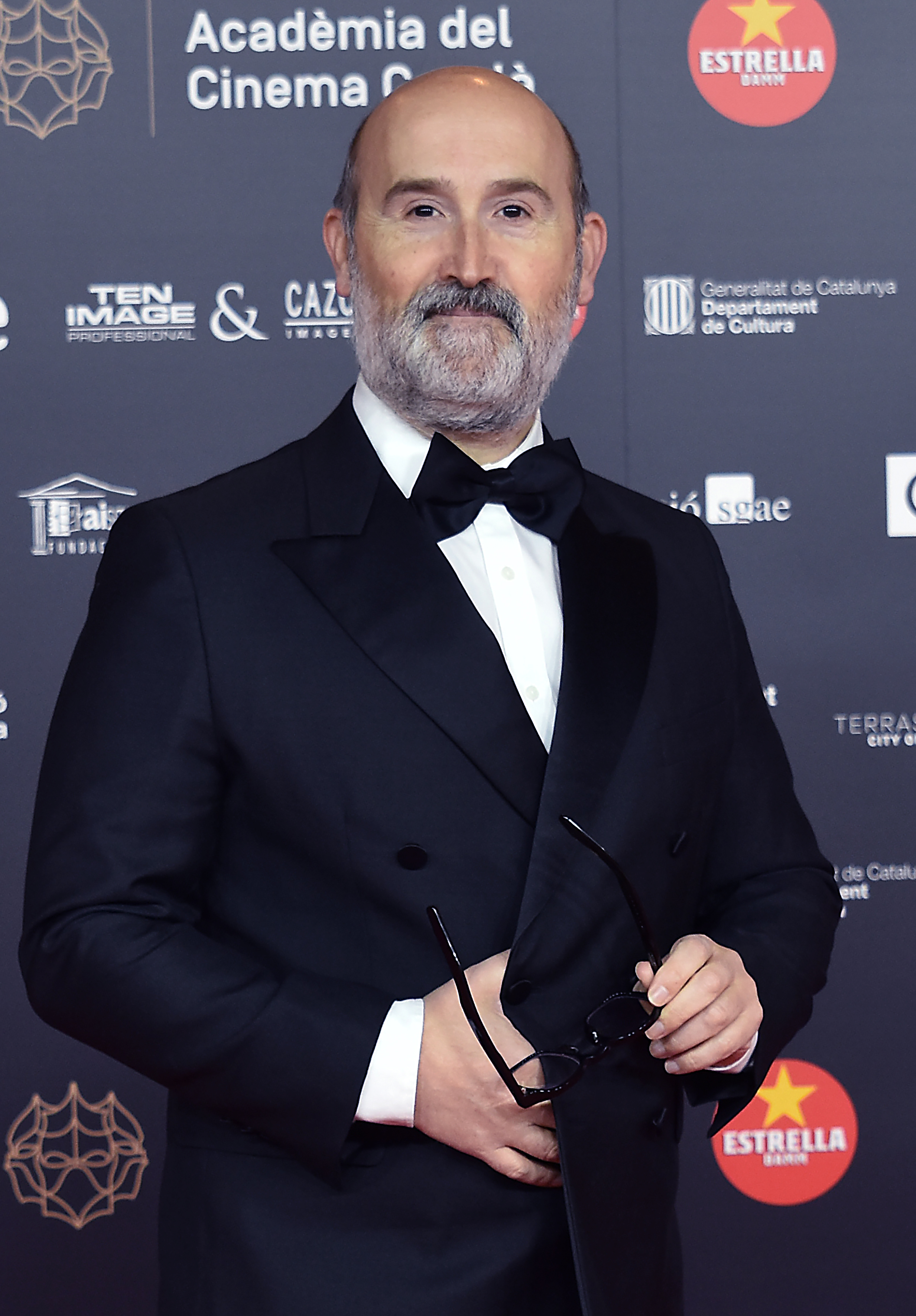
Javier Cámara won for Truman in 2015.

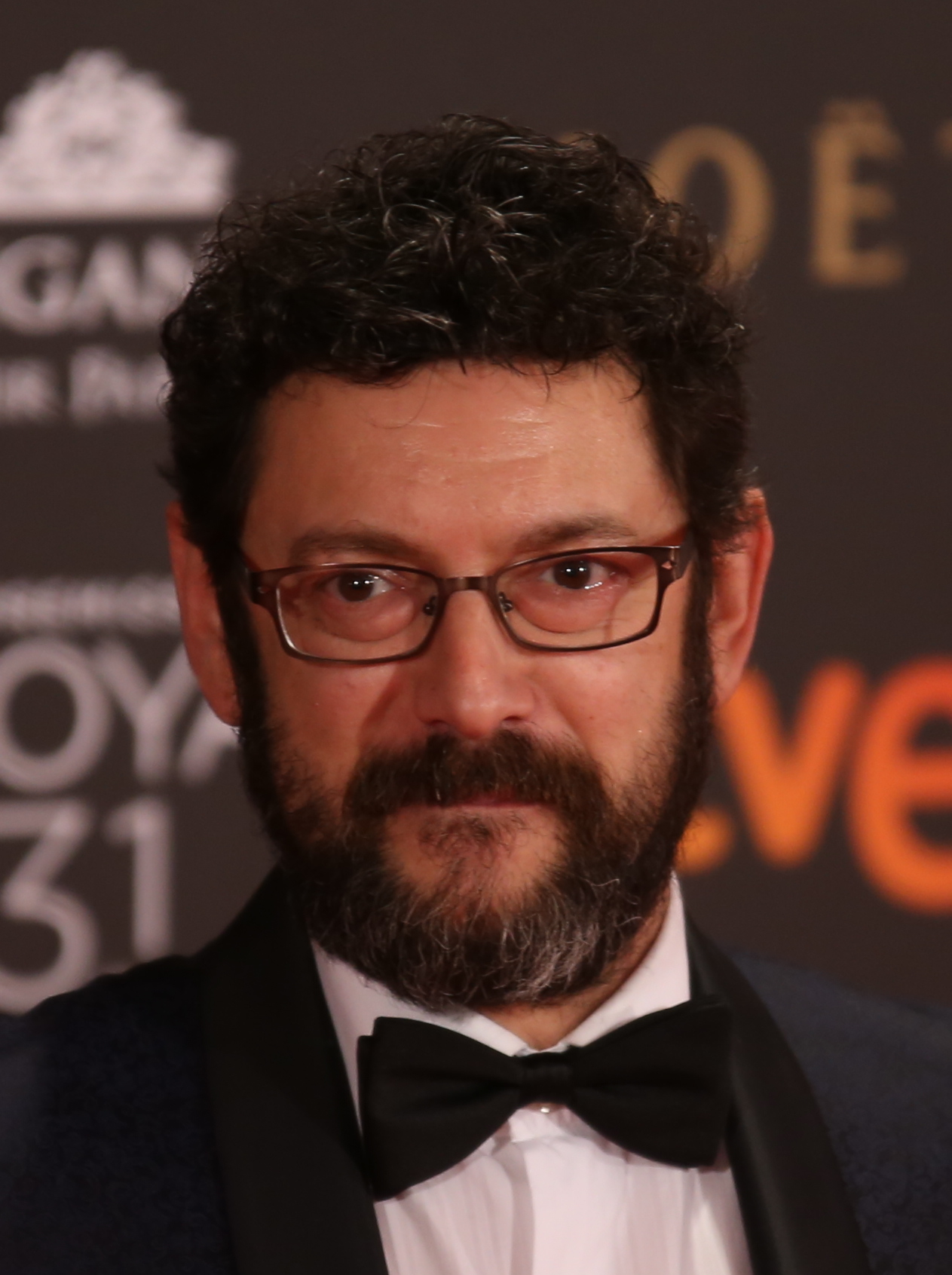
Manolo Solo won for The Fury of a Patient Man in 2016.

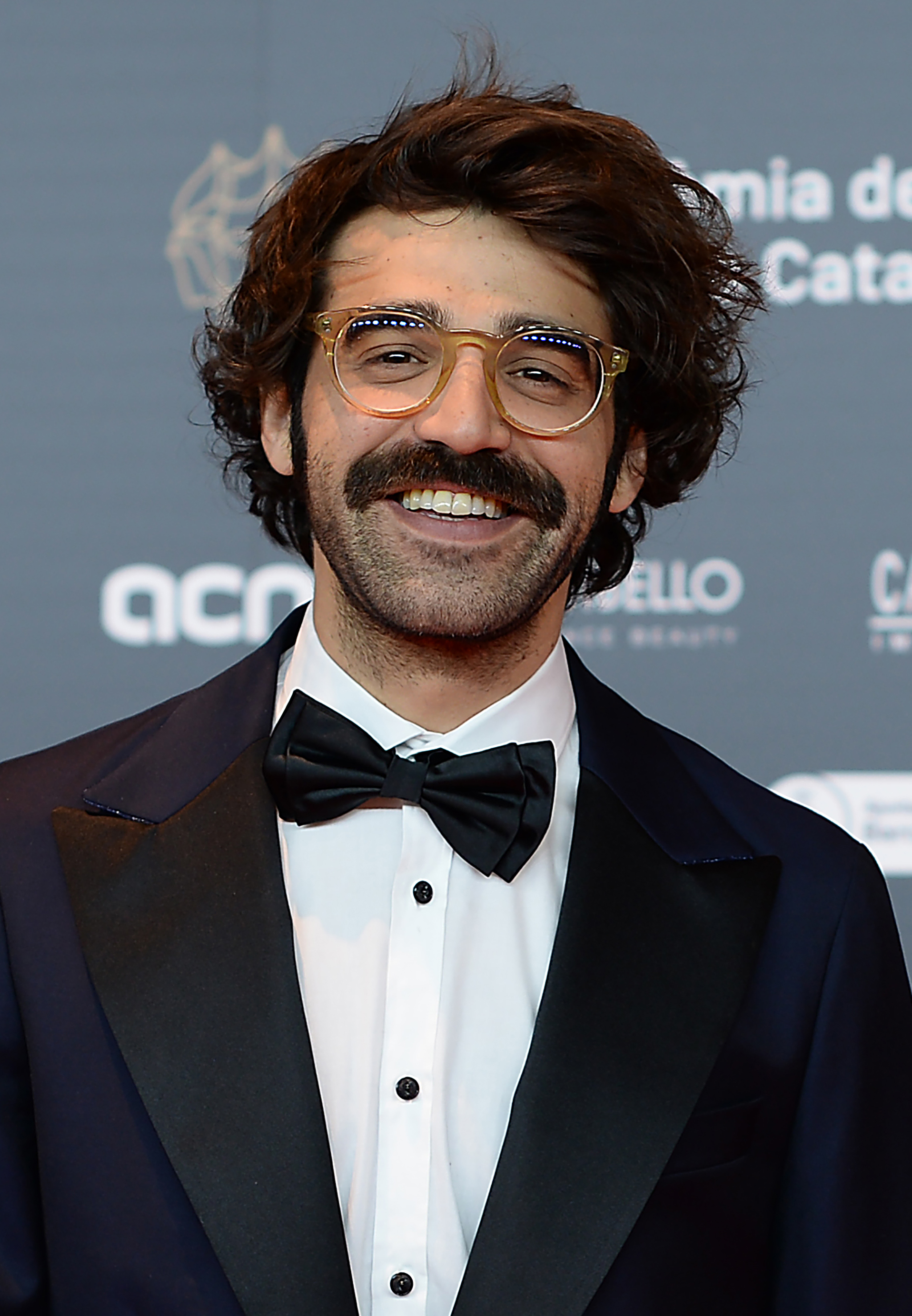
David Verdaguer won for Summer 1993 in 2017.

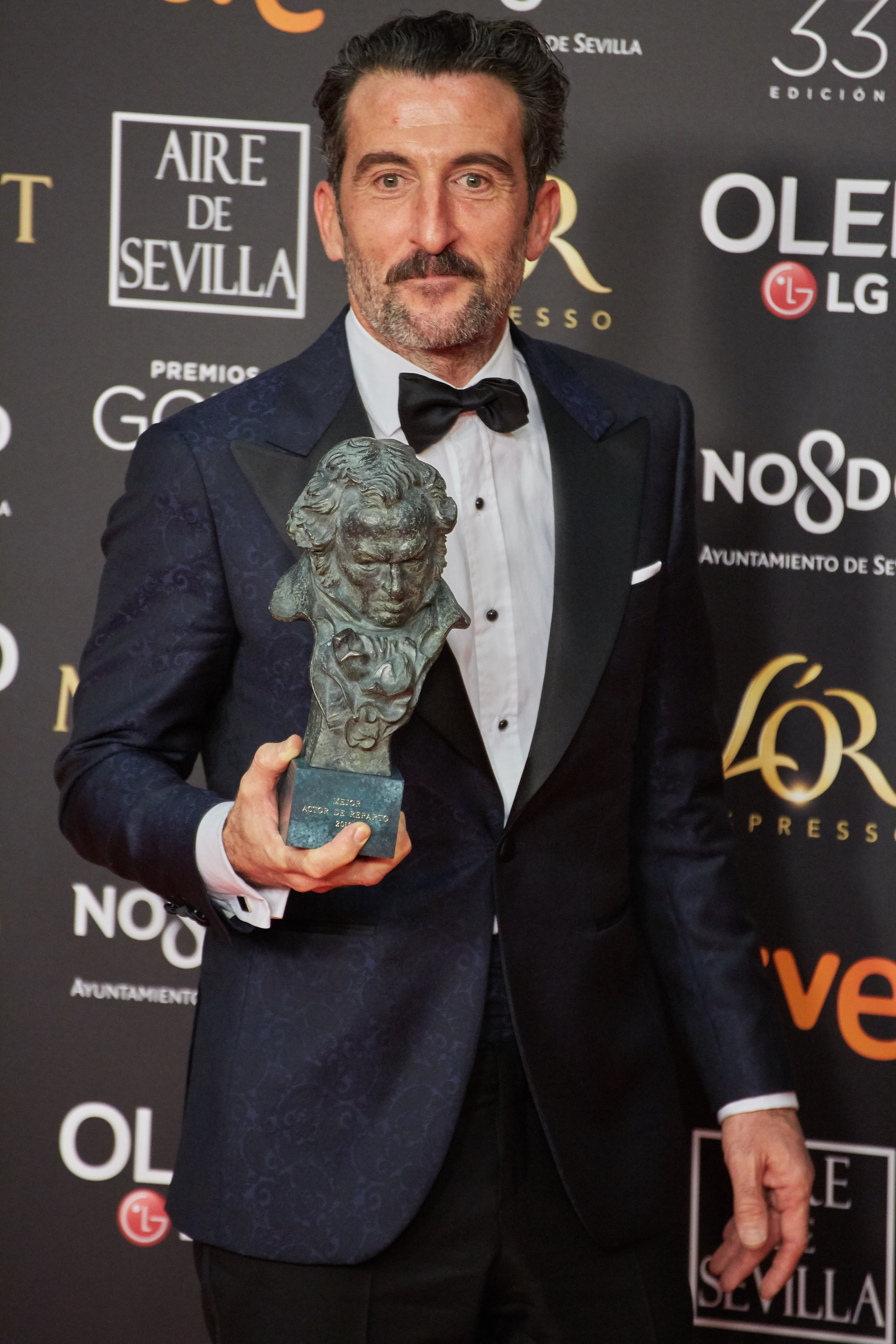
Luis Zahera won for The Realm in 2018 and The Beasts in 2022.

=== 1980s ===
Year	Actress	Role(s)	English title	Original title
1986 (1st)	Miguel Rellán	Alberto Goicoechea	Dear Nanny	Tata mía
1986 (1st)	Agustín González	Hilario	Mambru Went to War	Mambrú se fue a la guerra
1986 (1st)	Antonio Banderas	Ángel	Matador	
1987 (2nd)	Juan Echanove	Miguelín	Divine Words	Divinas palabras
1987 (2nd)	Agustín González	Agustín Planchadell	Moors and Christians	Moros y cristianos
1987 (2nd)	Pedro Ruiz	Pepe Planchadell	Moors and Christians	Moros y cristianos
1988 (3rd)	José Sazatornil	Alberto Sinsoles	Wait for Me in Heaven	Espérame en el cielo
1988 (3rd)	Ángel de Andrés López	Policeman	Baton Rouge	
1988 (3rd)	Jorge Sanz	Toto	El Lute II: Tomorrow I'll be Free	El Lute II: Mañana seré libre
1988 (3rd)	Guillermo Montesinos	Taxi driver	Women on the Verge of a Nervous Breakdown	Mujeres al borde de un ataque de nervios
1988 (3rd)	José Luis Gómez	John William Polidori	Rowing with the Wind	Remando al viento
1989 (4th)	Adolfo Marsillach	Charles III of Spain	Esquilache	
1989 (4th)	Enrique San Francisco	Roberto	El baile del pato	
1989 (4th)	Fernando Guillén	Vailer	The Dark Night	La noche oscura
1989 (4th)	Juan Echanove	Juancho	The Flight of the Dove	El vuelo de la paloma
1989 (4th)	Juan Luis Galiardo	Luis Doncel	The Flight of the Dove	El vuelo de la paloma
1989 (4th)	Manuel Huete	Ciri	The Flight of the Dove	El vuelo de la paloma

=== 1990s ===
Year	Actress	Role(s)	English title	Original title
1990 (5th)	Gabino Diego	Gustavete	¡Ay Carmela!	
1990 (5th)	Juan Echanove	Álvaro	Alone Together	A solas contigo
1990 (5th)	Francisco Rabal	Máximo Espejo	Tie Me Up! Tie Me Down!	¡Átame!
1991 (6th)	Juan Diego	Father Villaescusa	The Dumbfounded King	El rey pasmado
1991 (6th)	José Luis Gómez	Ugarte / Valdivia	Prince of Shadows	Beltenegros
1991 (6th)	Javier Gurruchaga	Valido	The Dumbfounded King	El rey pasmado
1992 (7th)	Fernando Fernán Gómez	Manolo	Belle Époque	
1992 (7th)	Enrique San Francisco	Curt	Club Virginia Orchestra	Orquesta Club Virginia
1992 (7th)	Gabino Diego	Juanito	Belle Époque	
1993 (8th)	Tito Valverde	Darío	Shadows in a Conflict	Sombras en una batalla
1993 (8th)	Juan Echanove	Sebastián	My Soul Brother	Mi hermano del alma
1993 (8th)	Javier Gurruchaga	Baron of Benicarles	Banderas, the Tyrant	Tirano Banderas
1994 (9th)	Javier Bardem	Lisardo	Running Out of Time	Días contados
1994 (9th)	Óscar Ladoire	Pablo	Alegre ma non troppo	
1994 (9th)	Agustín González	The father	The Worst Years of Our Lives	Los peores años de nuestra vida
1995 (10th)	Luis Ciges	Matacanes	Así en el cielo como en la tierra	
1995 (10th)	Fernando Guillén Cuervo	Raúl	Mouth to Mouth	Boca a boca
1995 (10th)	Federico Luppi	El Argentino	The Law of the Frontier	La ley de la frontera
1996 (11th)	Luis Cuenca	Grandfather	The Good Life	La buena vida
1996 (11th)	Jordi Mollà	Pármeno	La celestina	
1996 (11th)	Nancho Novo	Sempronio	La celestina	
1997 (12th)	José Sancho	Sancho	Live Flesh	Carne Trémula
1997 (12th)	Antonio Valero	Valerio	The Color of the Clouds	El color de las nubes
1997 (12th)	Juan Jesús Valverde	Justo	The Rats	Las ratas
1998 (13th)	Tony Leblanc	Felipe Torrente	Torrente, el brazo tonto de la ley	
1998 (13th)	Agustín González	Senén Corchado	The Grandfather	El abuelo
1998 (13th)	Francisco Algora	Ángel	Barrio	
1998 (13th)	Jorge Sanz	Julián Torralba	The Girl of Your Dreams	La niña de tus ojos
1999 (14th)	Juan Diego	Boronat	París-Tombuctú	
1999 (14th)	Mario Gas	Pere	Beloved/Friend	Amic/Amat
1999 (14th)	José Coronado	Young Francisco de Goya	Goya in Bordeaux	Goya en Burdeos
1999 (14th)	Álex Angulo	Julián	Dying of Laughter	Muertos de risa

=== 2000s ===
Year	Actress	Role(s)	English title	Original title
2000 (15th)	Emilio Gutiérrez Caba	Emilio	Common Wealth	La comunidad
2000 (15th)	Luis Cuenca	Damián	Masterpiece	Obra maestra
2000 (15th)	Juan Diego	Don Matías	You're the One	Una historia de entonces
2000 (15th)	Iñaki Miramón	Orfeo	You're the One	Una historia de entonces
2001 (16th)	Emilio Gutiérrez Caba	David	Ten Days Without Love	El cielo abierto
2001 (16th)	Antonio Dechent	Alejandro	Intacto	
2001 (16th)	Gael García Bernal	Davenport	Don't Tempt Me	Sin noticias de Dios
2001 (16th)	Eduard Fernández	Sierra	Sound of the Sea	Son de mar
2002 (17th)	Luis Tosar	José Suárez	Mondays In The Sun	Los lunes al sol
2002 (17th)	José Coronado	Rafael Mazas	Box 507	La caja 507
2002 (17th)	Carlos Hipólito	Julio	Story of a Kiss	Historia de un beso
2002 (17th)	Alberto San Juan	Rafa	The Other Side of the Bed	El otro lado de la cama
2003 (18th)	Eduard Fernández	Mario	In the City	En la ciudad
2003 (18th)	José Luis Gómez	Silvio	The End of a Mystery	La luz prodigiosa
2003 (18th)	Joan Dalmau	Antonio Miralles	Soldiers of Salamina	Soldados de Salamina
2003 (18th)	Juan Diego	Don Carlos	Torremolinos 73	
2004 (19th)	Celso Bugallo	José Sampedro	The Sea Inside	Mar adentro
2004 (19th)	Luis Varela	Don Antonio Fraguas	Ferpect Crime	Crimen ferpecto
2004 (19th)	Unax Ugalde	Gorilo	Héctor	
2004 (19th)	Juan Diego	Antonio	The 7th Day	El 7° día
2005 (20th)	Carmelo Gómez	Julio	The Method	El método
2005 (20th)	Javier Cámara	Simón	The Secret Life of Words	La vida secreta de las palabras
2005 (20th)	Fernando Guillén	Lucas	Other Days Will Come	Otros días vendrán
2005 (20th)	Enrique Villén	Armando	Ninette	
2006 (21st)	Antonio de la Torre	Antonio Mateo	DarkBlueAlmostBlack	Azuloscurocasinegro
2006 (21st)	Juan Diego Botto	Guillermo Pedreño	Go Away from Me	Vete de mí
2006 (21st)	Juan Echanove	Francisco de Quevedo	Alatriste	
2006 (21st)	Leonardo Sbaraglia	Jesús Irurre	Salvador (Puig Antich)	
2007 (22nd)	José Manuel Cervino	Jacinto	13 Roses	Las 13 rosas
2007 (22nd)	Raúl Arévalo	Fele	Seven Billiard Tables	Siete mesas de billar francés
2007 (22nd)	Emilio Gutiérrez Caba	Tino	Suso's Tower	La torre de Suso
2007 (22nd)	Carlos Larrañaga	Atila	Sunday Light	Luz de domingo
2007 (22nd)	Julián Villagrán	Lalo	Under the Stars	Bajo las estrellas
2008 (23rd)	Jordi Dauder	Don Juan	Camino	
2008 (23rd)	José Ángel Egido	Rector	The Blind Sunflowers	Los girasoles ciegos
2008 (23rd)	Fernando Tejero	Ramiro	Chef's Special	Fuera de carta
2008 (23rd)	José María Yazpik	Félix	Just Walking	Sólo quiero caminar
2009 (24th)	Raúl Arévalo	Álex	Fat People	Gordos
2009 (24th)	Antonio Resines	José Utrilla	Cell 211	Celda 211
2009 (24th)	Carlos Bardem	Apache	Cell 211	Celda 211
2009 (24th)	Ricardo Darín	Nicolás Vergara Grey	The Dancer and the Thief	El baile de la victoria

=== 2010s ===
Year	Actress	Role(s)	English title	Original title
2010 (25th)	Karra Elejalde	Antón / Christopher Columbus	Even the Rain	También la lluvia
2010 (25th)	Álex Angulo	Peláez	The Great Vazquez	El gran Vázquez
2010 (25th)	Sergi López	The Mayor	Black Bread	Pa negre
2010 (25th)	Eduard Fernández	Tito	Biutiful	
2011 (26th)	Lluís Homar	Max	Eva	
2011 (26th)	Raúl Arévalo	Julián	Cousinhood	Primos
2011 (26th)	Juanjo Artero	Leiva	No Rest for the Wicked	No habrá paz para los malvados
2011 (26th)	Juan Diego	Alfonso Armada	17 Hours	23-F. La película
2012 (27th)	Julián Villagrán	Joaquín	Unit 7	Grupo 7
2012 (27th)	Ewan McGregor	Henry Bennett	The Impossible	Lo imposible
2012 (27th)	Josep Maria Pou	Don Carlos, the impresario	Blancanieves	
2012 (27th)	Antonio de la Torre	Diego	Invader	Invasor
2013 (28th)	Roberto Álamo	Benjamín "Ben" Montero	Family United	La gran familia española
2013 (28th)	Carlos Bardem	Carlomonte	Scorpion in Love	Alacrán enamorado
2013 (28th)	Juan Diego Botto	Luis	Ismael	
2013 (28th)	Antonio de la Torre	Adán Montero	Family United	La gran familia española
2014 (29th)	Karra Elejalde	Koldo Zugasti	Spanish Affair	Ocho apellidos vascos
2014 (29th)	Eduard Fernández	Sergio	El Niño	
2014 (29th)	Antonio de la Torre	Rodrigo	Marshland	La isla mínima
2014 (29th)	Jose Sacristán	Damián	Magical Girl	
2015 (30th)	Javier Cámara	Tomás	Truman	
2015 (30th)	Felipe García Vélez	Justo "Caralimpia"	Nothing in Return	A cambio de nada
2015 (30th)	Manolo Solo	Pablo Ruz	B, la película	
2015 (30th)	Tim Robbins	Rodrigo	A Perfect Day	Un día perfecto
2016 (31st)	Manolo Solo	Santi "Triana"	The Fury of a Patient Man	Tarde para la ira
2016 (31st)	Karra Elejalde	Manolo	100 Meters	100 metros
2016 (31st)	Javier Gutiérrez	Alcachofa	The Olive Tree	El olivo
2016 (31st)	Javier Pereira	Andrés Bosque	May God Save Us	Que Dios nos perdone
2017 (32nd)	David Verdaguer	Esteve	Summer 1993	Estiu 1993
2017 (32nd)	José Mota	Pepe	Abracadabra	
2017 (32nd)	Antonio de la Torre	Juan	The Motive	El autor
2017 (32nd)	Bill Nighy	Edmund Brundish	The Bookshop	La librería
2018 (33rd)	Luis Zahera	Luis Cabrera	The Realm	El reino
2018 (33rd)	Juan Margallo	Julio Montero Ruíz	Champions	Campeones
2018 (33rd)	Antonio de la Torre	José Mujica	A Twelve-Year Night	La noche de 12 años
2018 (33rd)	Eduard Fernández	Fernando	Everybody Knows	Todos lo saben
2019 (34th)	Eduard Fernández	José Millán Astray	While at War	Mientras dure la guerra
2019 (34th)	Luis Callejo	Capataz	Out in the Open	Intemperie
2019 (34th)	Asier Etxeandia	Alberto Crespo	Pain and Glory	Dolor y gloria
2019 (34th)	Leonardo Sbaraglia	Federico Delgado	Pain and Glory	Dolor y gloria

=== 2020s ===
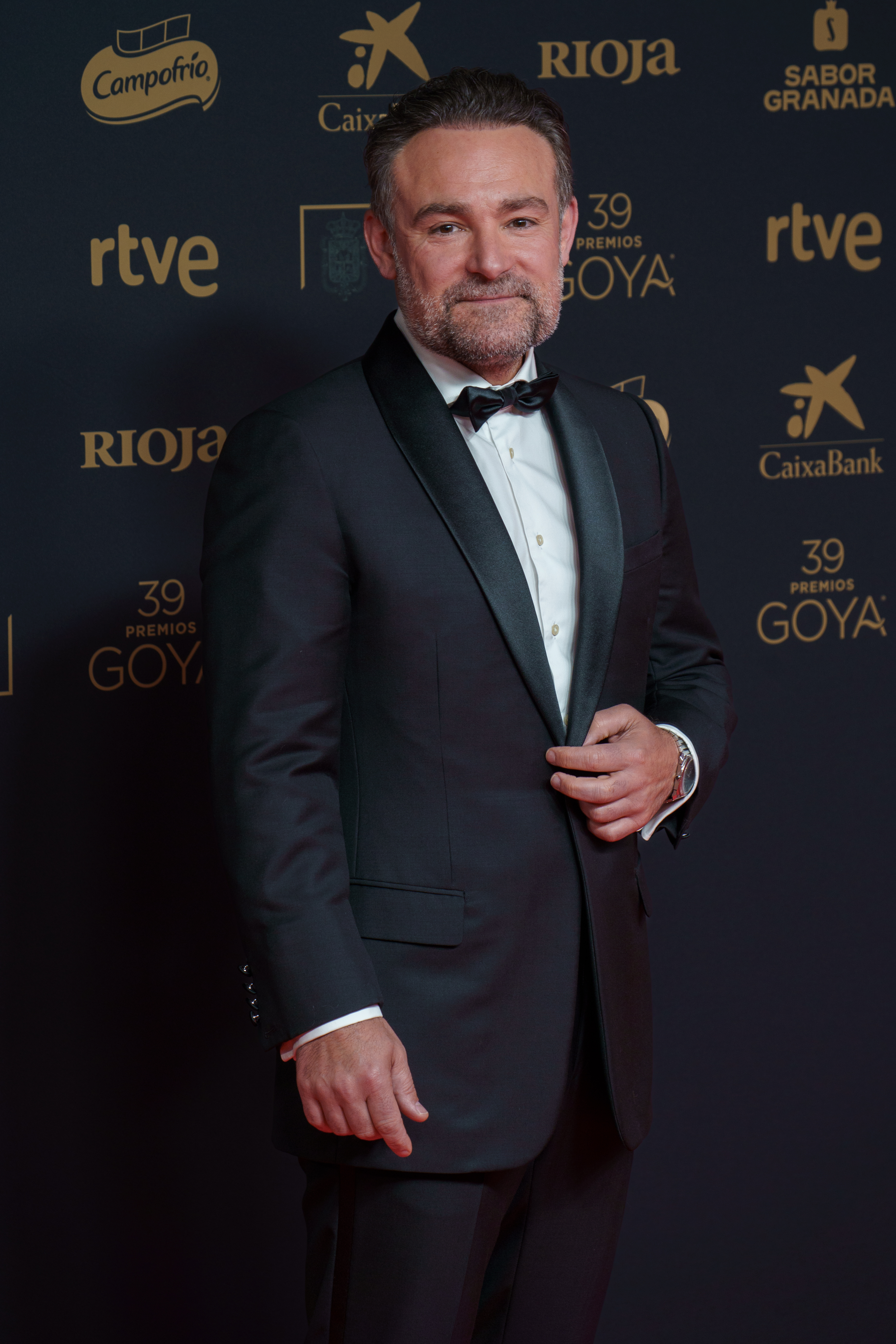
Urko Olazabal won for Maixabel (2021)

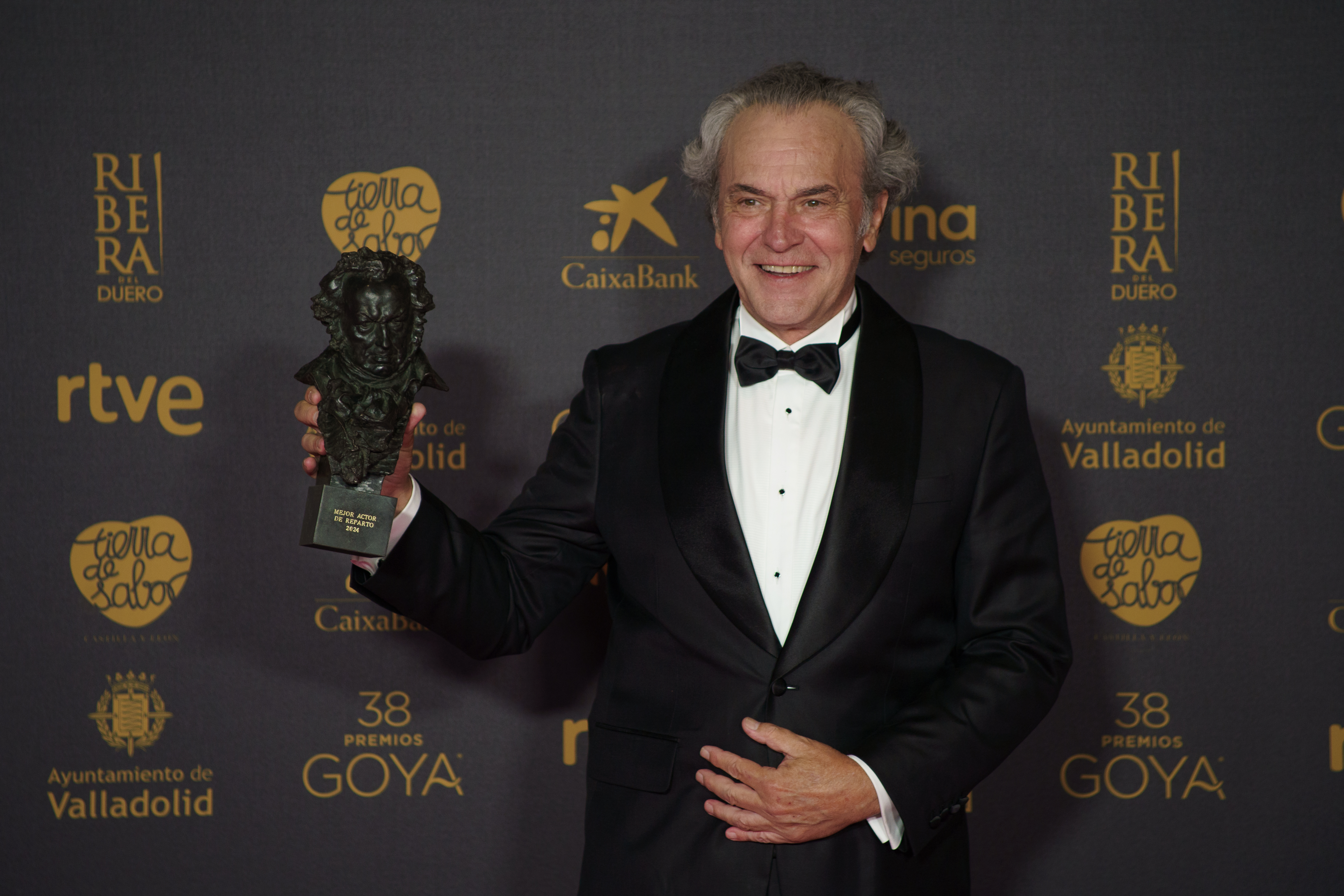
José Coronado won for Close Your Eyes (2023)

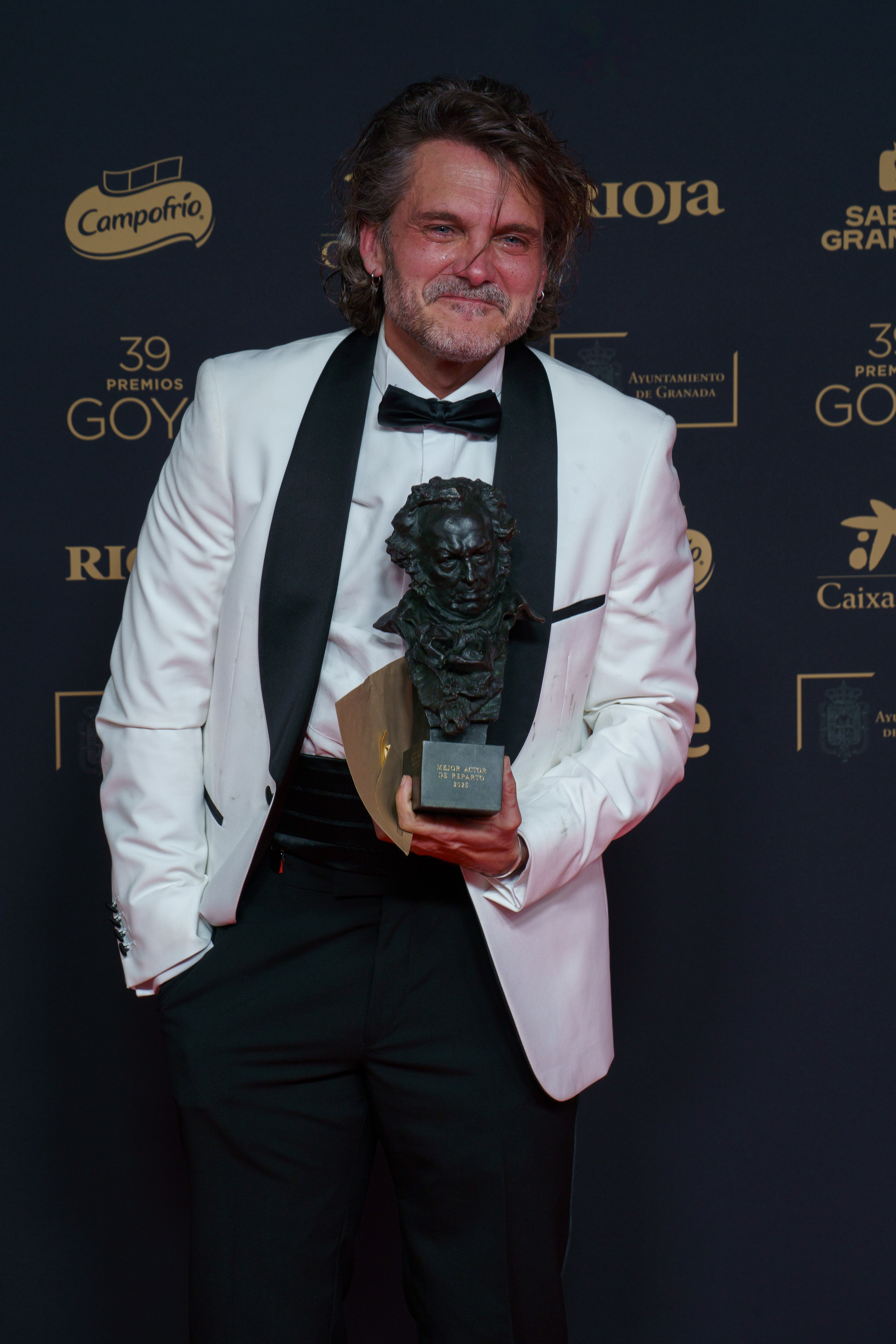
Salva Reina won for The 47 (2024)

Year	Actress	Role(s)	English title	Original title
2020 (35th)	Alberto San Juan	Salva	The People Upstairs	Sentimental
2020 (35th)	Álvaro Cervantes	Mateo	Adú	
2020 (35th)	Sergi López	Armando Román	Rosa's Wedding	La boda de Rosa
2020 (35th)	Juan Diego Botto	Antonio	The Europeans	Los europeos
2021 (36th)	Urko Olazabal	Luis Carrasco	Maixabel	
2021 (36th)	Fernando Albizu	Román	The Good Boss	El buen patrón
2021 (36th)	Celso Bugallo	Fortuna	The Good Boss	El buen patrón
2021 (36th)	Manolo Solo	Miralles	The Good Boss	El buen patrón
2022 (37th)	Luis Zahera	Xan Anta	The Beasts	As bestas
2022 (37th)	Diego Anido	Lorenzo Anta	The Beasts	As bestas
2022 (37th)	Ramón Barea	Koldo	Lullaby	Cinco lobitos
2022 (37th)	Fernando Tejero	Marbella	Prison 77	Modelo 77
2022 (37th)	Jesús Carroza	El Negro	Prison 77	Modelo 77
2023 (38th)	José Coronado	Julio Arenas / Gardel	Close Your Eyes	Cerrar los ojos
2023 (38th)	Martxelo Rubio	Gorka	20,000 Species of Bees	20.000 especies de abejas
2023 (38th)	Juan Carlos Vellido	Roberto	Under Therapy	Bajo terapia
2023 (38th)	Alex Brendemühl	Gerard	Creatura	
2023 (38th)	Hugo Silva	Piter	Un amor	
2024 (39th)	Salva Reina	Felipín	The 47	El 47
2024 (39th)	Enric Auquer	David	A House on Fire	Casa en flames
2024 (39th)	Óscar de la Fuente	Vicente	La casa	
2024 (39th)	Luis Tosar	Ángel Salcedo	Undercover	La infiltrada
2024 (39th)	Antonio de la Torre	Ramón	Glimmers	Los destellos
2025 (40th)	Álvaro Cervantes	Héctor	Deaf	Sorda
2025 (40th)	Miguel Rellán	Antonio de Sosa	The Captive	El cautivo
2025 (40th)	Juan Minujín	Pablo	Sundays	Los domingos
2025 (40th)	Kandido Uranga	Xanti	Maspalomas	
2025 (40th)	Tamar Novas	Xoel	Band Together	Rondallas

== Superlatives ==
=== Actors with more than 1 award in the category ===
- 2 wins: Juan Diego, 6 nominations
- 2 wins: Eduard Fernández, 6 nominations
- 2 wins: Karra Elejalde, 3 nominations
- 2 wins: Emilio Gutiérrez Caba, 3 nominations
- 2 wins: Luis Zahera, 2 nominations

=== Actors with more than 1 nomination in the category ===
- 7 nominations: Antonio de la Torre
- 6 nominations: Juan Diego
- 6 nominations: Eduard Fernández
- 5 nominations: Juan Echanove
- 4 nominations: Agustín González
- 3 nominations: Raúl Arévalo
- 3 nominations: Karra Elejalde
- 3 nominations: José Luis Gómez
- 3 nominations: Emilio Gutiérrez Caba
- 3 nominations: José Coronado
- 3 nominations: Juan Diego Botto
- 3 nominations: Manolo Solo
- 2 nominations: Álex Angulo
- 2 nominations: Carlos Bardem
- 2 nominations: Celso Bugallo
- 2 nominations: Javier Cámara
- 2 nominations: Luis Cuenca
- 2 nominations: Gabino Diego
- 2 nominations: Fernando Guillén
- 2 nominations: Javier Gurruchaga
- 2 nominations: Sergi López
- 2 nominations: Enrique San Francisco
- 2 nominations: Alberto San Juan
- 2 nominations: Jorge Sanz
- 2 nominations: Leonardo Sbaraglia
- 2 nominations: Julián Villagrán
- 2 nominations: Luis Zahera
- 2 nominations: Fernando Tejero
- 2 nominations: Luis Tosar
- 2 nominations: Miguel Rellán
- 2 nominations: Álvaro Cervantes
