= Los Ronaldos =

Spanish rock band

Los Ronaldos was a Spanish rock band led by Coque Malla, emerged in Madrid in 1985 and active until 1998. However, in 2007 they met again for the release of the EP 4 Canciones, and later toured, recording a live album called La bola extra. In 2008 they split up again and continued their solo careers.

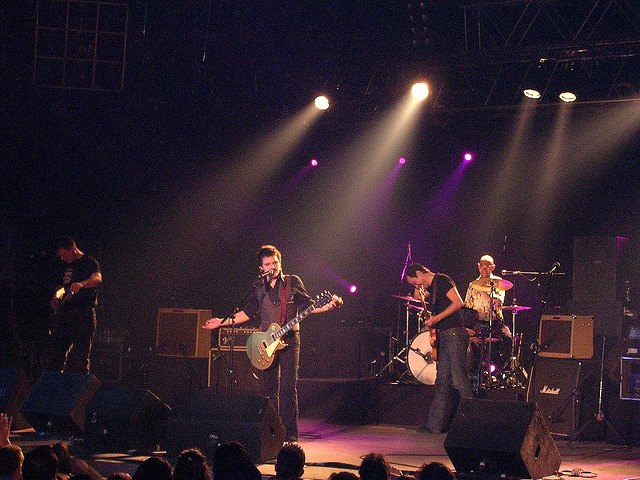
Los Ronaldos

== History ==
The group's first rehearsal was in 1985. They gave their first concert in January 1986 and performed regularly in small venues in the city of Madrid. The deal with the multinational EMI allowed them to release their first album, entitled Los Ronaldos, with one of their first hits. From that first LP several immediate hits emerged such as "Sí, sí", "Si os vais" and "Ana y Choni". Their next album, Saca la Lengua (1988), was the most successful, due to its star track, "Adiós papá", one of the group's most popular songs. In 1990, Sabor salado was released, recorded in the United Kingdom and produced by John Cale, which did not have such massive public support as the previous two.

Their next two albums did not win the favour of their followers either, and in 1995, drummer Ricardo Moreno left the band, being replaced by Daniel Parra. With him, in 1996 they released what would be their last album, Quiero que estemos cerca, a live recording that included all their greatest hits. Two years later the band was broken up.

In 2007, the original members of Los Ronaldos met again on the occasion of the release of a new EP titled 4 Canciones, which contained several unreleased songs that became big hits such as "No puedo vivir sin ti". In the summer of that year they made a promotional tour, and recorded a live album titled La bola extra. In 2008 they split up again and continued their solo careers.

They plan to reform in 2027 in order to commemorate the 40th anniversary of the birth of the band with a book, compilation album and tour in Spain, Europe and America.

== Discography ==
- Los Ronaldos (1987)
- Saca la lengua (1988)
- Sabor salado (1990)
- Cero (1992)
- Idiota (1994)
- Quiero que estemos cerca (1996)
- Guárdalo con amor (2005)
- 4 Canciones (2007)
- La bola extra (2008)
