= The Detective and Death =

- Theatrical release poster
- Spanish: El detective y la muerte
- Directed by: Gonzalo Suárez
- Screenplay by: Gonzalo Suárez; Azucena Rodríguez
- Based on: "The Story of a Mother" by Hans Christian Andersen
- Produced by: Andrés Vicente Gómez
- Starring: Javier Bardem; Maria de Medeiros; Mapi Galán; Héctor Alterio; Carmelo Gómez; Paulina Gálvez
- Cinematography: Carlos Suárez
- Edited by: José Salcedo
- Music by: Suso Saiz
- Production companies: LolaFilms; Ditirambo Films
- Release dates: 22 September 1994 (SSIFF); 30 September 1994 (Spain)

The Detective and Death (Spanish: El detective y la muerte) is a 1994 Spanish thriller film directed by Gonzalo Suárez.

== Plot ==
Loosely based on Hans Christian Andersen's "The Story of a Mother", it is set in a fictional European city stirred by racial conflicts (in lieu of the forest from the short story).

== Cast ==
- Javier Bardem as Detective Cornelio
- Maria de Medeiros as Maria
- Carmelo Gómez as Dark Man
- Héctor Alterio as G.M.
- Mapi Galán as Laura
- Francis Lorenzo as Don Luis
- Paulina Gálvez as Ofelia
- Myriam de Maeztu as Rosa
- Charo López as Duquesa
- Jerzy Bończak as Hombre tiburón

== Production ==
Produced by LolaFilms and Ditirambo Films, it was shot in between Llanes and Warsaw.

== Release ==
The film was presented at the San Sebastián International Film Festival in September 1994. It was theatrically released on 30 September 1994.

== Reception ==
David Rooney of Variety assessed that despite the bizarre meeting between film noir and gruesome fairy tale featuring "commanding perfs and arresting visuals", the helmer "encumbers the lugubrious thriller with pretentious hokum".

== Accolades ==
| Year | Award | Category | Nominee(s) | Result | Ref. |
|---|---|---|---|---|---|
| 1994 | 42nd San Sebastián International Film Festival | Silver Shell for Best Actor | Javier Bardem | Won | |
| 1995 | 9th Goya Awards | Best Original Screenplay | Gonzalo Suárez | Nominated | |
| 1995 | 9th Goya Awards | Best Production Supervision | José Luis García Arrojo | Nominated | |
| 1995 | 9th Goya Awards | Best Original Score | Suso Saiz | Nominated | |
| 1995 | 9th Goya Awards | Best Editing | José Salcedo | Nominated | |
| 1995 | 9th Goya Awards | Best Special Effects | Miroslaw Marchwinski | Nominated | |
| 1995 | 45th Fotogramas de Plata | Best Actor | Carmelo Gómez | Won | |
| 1995 | 50th CEC Awards | Best Cinematography | Carlos Suárez | Won | |

== See also ==
- List of Spanish films of 1994
