= It's All Lies =

1994 film

- Theatrical release poster
- Spanish: Todo es mentira
- Directed by: Álvaro Fernández Armero
- Written by: Álvaro Fernández Armero
- Produced by: Enrique Cerezo; Carlos Vasallo
- Starring: Penélope Cruz; Coque Malla; Jordi Mollà; Cristina Rossenvinge; Gustavo Salmerón; Irene Bau; Fernando Colomo; Mónica López; Ariadna Gil
- Cinematography: Antonio Cuevas
- Edited by: Iván Aledo
- Music by: Coque Malla
- Production company: Atrium Productions
- Distributed by: Columbia TriStar Films de España
- Release date: 14 October 1994
- Running time: 99 min
- Country: Spain
- Language: Spanish

It's All Lies (Spanish: Todo es mentira) is a 1994 Spanish comedy film written and directed by Álvaro Fernández Armero and starring Penélope Cruz and Coque Malla. It is the first in a series of two films, with The Truth and Other Lies being the last film. Both movies explore the complexities of relationships which include compromise and the unvarnished truth.

== Cast ==
- Penélope Cruz as Lucía
- Coque Malla as Pablo
- Jordi Mollà as Ariel
- Cristina Rossenvinge as Lola
- Gustavo Salmerón as Claudio
- Irene Bau as Natalia
- Fernando Colomo as Alejandro
- Mónica López as Beatriz
- Ariadna Gil as "La sucia"
- Santiago Segura as vendedor ('salesman')

== Release ==
The film was released theatrically in Spain on 14 October 1994.

== Accolades ==
Year	Award	Category	Nominee(s)	Result	Ref.
1995	9th Goya Awards	Best New Director	Álvaro Fernández Armero	Nominated	
1995	9th Goya Awards	Best New Actor	Coque Malla	Nominated	

== See also ==
- List of Spanish films of 1994
