= The Worst Years of Our Lives =

- Theatrical release poster
- Spanish: Los peores años de nuestra vida
- Directed by: Emilio Martínez Lázaro
- Written by: David Trueba
- Starring: Gabino Diego; Ariadna Gil; Jorge Sanz; Agustín González; Maite Blasco; Jesús Bonilla; Carmen Elias; Ayanta Barilli
- Edited by: Iván Aledo
- Music by: Michel Camilo
- Production companies: Fernando Trueba PC; Kaplan; Iberoamericana Films
- Distributed by: United International Pictures
- Release date: 9 September 1994
- Running time: 100 minutes
- Country: Spain
- Language: Spanish

The Worst Years of Our Lives (Spanish: Los peores años de nuestra vida) is a 1994 Spanish comedy film directed by Emilio Martínez Lázaro and written by David Trueba which stars Gabino Diego, Ariadna Gil, and Jorge Sanz. The film was nominated for four Goya Awards, winning one (for best sound).

The film is an attempt to update 1980s comedia madrileña trend (for urban comedies in Spain during the Transition) to a new social context. Shooting locations in Madrid included Malasaña (calle del Molino de Viento).

== Cast ==
- Gabino Diego as Alberto
- Ariadna Gil as María
- Jorge Sanz as Roberto
- Agustín González as padre
- Maite Blasco as madre
- Jesús Bonilla as Santos
- Carmen Elias as Carola
- Ayanta Barilli as Rosy

== Accolades ==
Year	Award	Category	Nominee(s)	Result	Ref.
1995	9th Goya Awards	Best Original Screenplay	David Trueba	Nominated	
1995	9th Goya Awards	Best Actor	Gabino Diego	Nominated	
1995	9th Goya Awards	Best Supporting Actor	Agustín González	Nominated	
1995	9th Goya Awards	Best Sound	Carlos Garrido, Gilles Ortion, José Antonio Bermúdez, Polo Aledo	Won	

== See also ==
- List of Spanish films of 1994
