= Alondra Bentley =

Spanish singer-songwriter

Alondra López Bentley
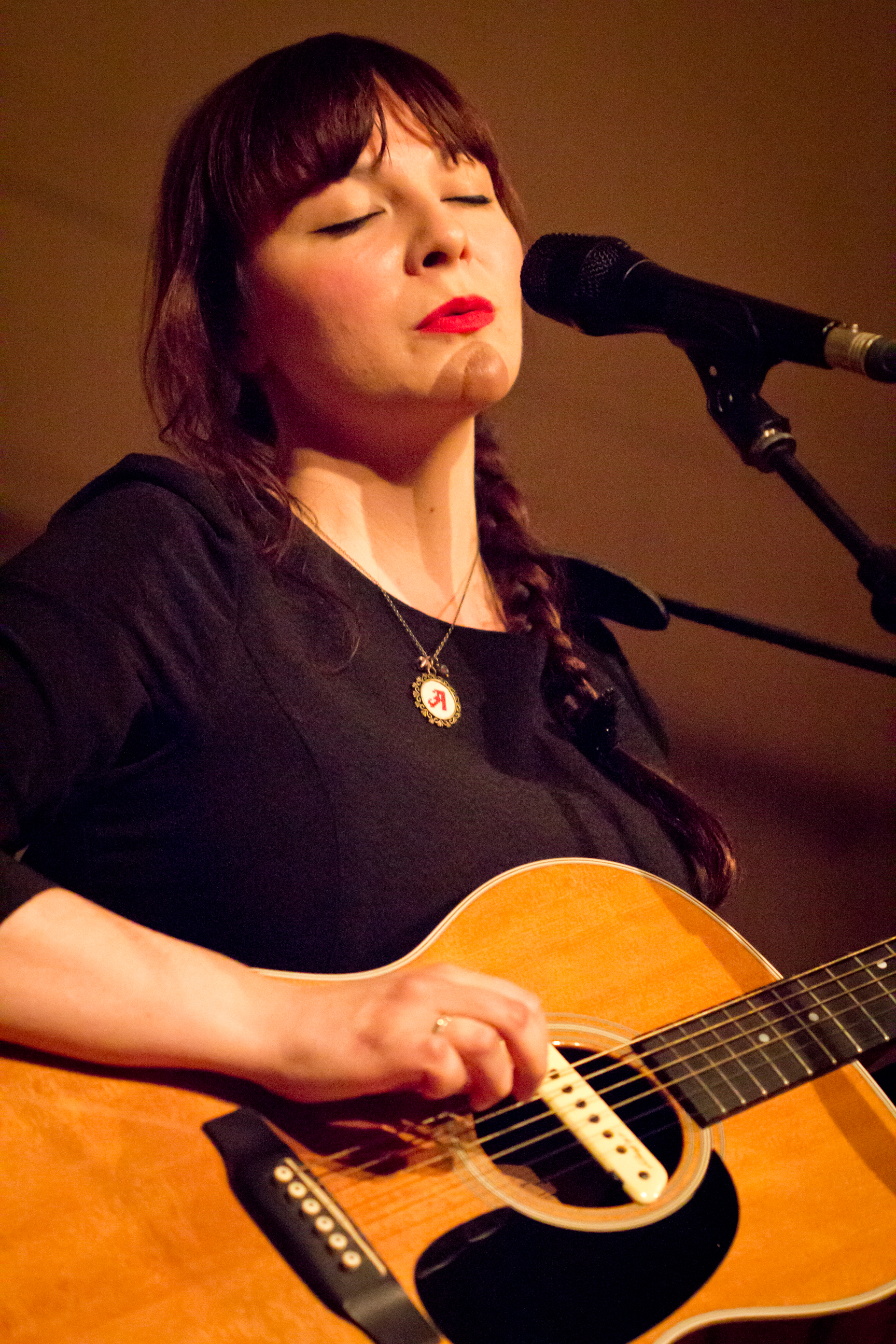
- Bentley in 2015

Background information
- Born: 25 January 1983 (age 43); Lancaster, England
- Genres: Folk, pop
- Occupations: Singer, songwriter
- Instruments: Vocals, guitar
- Label: Gran Derby
- Members: Alondra Bentley; Nacho Ruiz; Xema Fuertes; Caio Bellveser; Pepe Andreu
- Website: alondrabentley.com

Alondra López Bentley (born 25 January 1983) is an English-Spanish singer-songwriter. She was born in Lancaster, Lancashire, England and has been living in Spain since the age of five.

== Life and education ==
She was born in Lancaster, England, on 25 January 1983. Her mother, Susan Bentley, was a painter and her father, Juan Antonio López García, was a singer, actor and poet. She moved with her family to Murcia (Spain) when she was five years old. She studied in Murcia's Art School and then went on to Murcia's University to study Fine Arts but dropped out after four years to engage in her music career. She is completely self-taught in guitar playing and singing. She is currently living in Madrid.

== Career ==
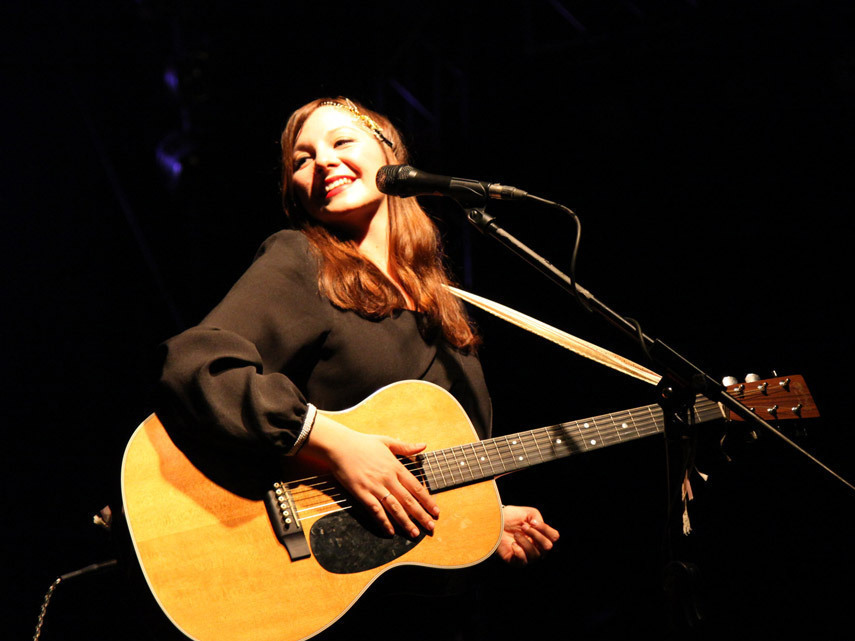
Bentley playing in Beijing in 2014

Alondra Bentley started writing her own songs at the age of 16. At that time she joined a few short-lived bands but soon focused on her own tunes. She made her first demo under the name Ladybird but soon decided to use her real name. After winning the Creajoven contest for local singer songwriters in Murcia she started doing her first solo shows. In 2006, her demo was voted as one of the best of the year in the Radio 3 (Spanish national public radio) show, 'Disco Grande'. Right after, she began writing the songs that would eventually form Ashfield Avenue,

Alondra's debut album. The title comes from the name of the street where she was born in Lancaster. The first single 'Dot, dot dot' was one of the most radiated songs that year. The album was produced by César Verdú and had a big number of guest musicians such as Gary Olson, Isobel Knowles, Fino Oyonarte, Joaquín Pascual, Vicente Macía, Joserra Semperena, Xel Pereda, etc. It was recorded by Paco Loco in his studio in Cádiz in December 2008 and released by Absolute Beginners in April 2009. Alondra gave hundreds of concerts in Spain in 2008, 2009 and 2010 and she has taken part of festivals like Primavera Sound, Festival Internacional de Benicàssim, La Mar de Músicas, Sonorama, Faraday, Lolapop, Lemonpop, Festival de la Luz, etc. She also toured Mexico and the United Kingdom.

In summer 2012, the label Gran Derby Records released her first album with songs for children under the title Alondra Bentley Sings For Children, It's Holidays!. The following autumn, The Garden Room, her third record (and Ashfield Avenue's proper follow-up) was released by Gran Derby Records as well. This time, the album was produced by Josh Rouse and was recorded in Rio Bravo studio (Valencia) featuring musicians like Caio Bellveser, Xema Fuertes, Pepe Andreu, Nacho Ruiz, Pere Munuera and Joe Pissapia. Shortly after, in November 2012, she wrote four brand new songs for the film Loving Eimish. During 2013 and 2014, Alondra has been touring extensively in Spain and China.

== Musicians ==
- Nacho Ruiz (piano, guitar, vocals)
- Xema Fuertes (guitar, banjo, drums, vocals)
- Caio Bellveser (double bass, vocals)
- Pepe Andreu (trumpet, flugelhorn)

She has worked with musicians like Josh Rouse, Refree, Nacho Vegas, Cristina Rosenvinge, Coque Malla, Amaral, Nine Stories, Tórtel, etc. She has also opened for artists such as Eels, Richard Hawley, Josh Rouse, and Matthew E. White.

== Discography ==
Albums

- Ashfield Avenue (2008) – Absolute Beginners Records
- Alondra Bentley Sings for Children, It's Holidays! (2012) – Gran Derby Records
- The Garden Room (2012) – Gran Derby Records
- Resolutions (2015) – Gran Derby Records

Soundtrack albums

- Loving Eimish OST (2012) – Gran Derby Records
