= All Men Are the Same (1994 film) =

- Theatrical release poster
- Spanish: Todos los hombres sois iguales
- Directed by: Manuel Gómez Pereira
- Starring: Imanol Arias; Antonio Resines; Juanjo Puigcorbé; Cristina Marcos; María Barranco; Pastora Vega; Kiti Manver
- Distributed by: Columbia TriStar Films de España
- Release date: 25 February 1994
- Running time: 1h 42min
- Country: Spain
- Language: Spanish

All Men Are the Same (Spanish: Todos los hombres sois iguales) is a 1994 Spanish comedy film directed by Manuel Gómez Pereira.

== Cast ==
- Imanol Arias as Juan Luis
- Antonio Resines as Manolo
- Juanjo Puigcorbé as Joaquín
- Cristina Marcos as Yoli
- María Barranco as Susana
- Pastora Vega as Merche
- Kiti Mánver as Esther
- Ana Gracia -
- Virginia Mataix -
- Tito Valverde as César
- Nancho Novo as Eduardo
- Carmen Balagué as Pilar
- Jesús Bonilla as Alberto
- Isabel Ordaz as Lolita

== See also ==
- List of Spanish films of 1994
