= Días contados =

1994 Spanish film by Imanol Uribe

- Theatrical release poster
- Directed by: Imanol Uribe
- Screenplay by: Imanol Uribe
- Based on: Días contados by Juan Madrid
- Produced by: Imanol Uribe; Andrés Santana
- Starring: Carmelo Gómez; Ruth Gabriel; Candela Peña; Karra Elejalde; Elvira Mínguez; Javier Bardem
- Cinematography: Javier Aguirresarobe
- Edited by: Teresa Font
- Music by: José Nieto
- Production companies: Aiete Films; Ariane Films
- Distributed by: United International Pictures
- Release date: 6 October 1994
- Running time: 93 minutes
- Country: Spain
- Language: Spanish

Días contados (English title: Running Out of Time; literally: Numbered Days) is a 1994 Spanish thriller film directed and written by Imanol Uribe. It features Carmelo Gómez, Ruth Gabriel, Candela Peña, and Javier Bardem, among others. It is based on the novel of the same name by Juan Madrid.

== Plot ==
Antonio, a brazen, individualistic ETA terrorist, travels with two fellow cell members, Carlos and Lourdes to Madrid, where they intend to carry out a terrorist attack on a police station. Just like Lourdes, with whom he shares a complex romantic liaison, Antonio is caught in a downward spiral of disenchantment and despondency with respect to the organization and the life he has led so far.

He moves into the area under the guise of an unassuming photographer for the press, and finds himself falling for his neighbor, Charo, a naive prostitute with an impending drug problem who is unaware of Antonio's activities. She reciprocates, and Antonio uses her whimsical desire to have their first tryst in Granada as an excuse to flee Madrid right after he shoots a police officer. Meanwhile, matters become complicated when Antonio's identity as a terrorist is made public and Charo's sleazy, drug-addicted acquaintance Lisardo, incidentally an informant, gives Antonio's identity away to corrupt police officer Rafa.

The film ends on a tragic note as the car bomb (containing 100 kg of explosives) and the police car carrying Charo haplessly converge in front of the police station. Fuelled by his love, a self-destructive streak, or both, Antonio follows the car to the station gate right as Carlos presses the detonator.

== Cast ==
- Carmelo Gómez as Antonio
- Ruth Gabriel as Charo
- Candela Peña as Vanessa
- Elvira Mínguez as Lourdes
- Javier Bardem as Lisardo
- Pepón Nieto as Ugarte
- Karra Elejalde as Rafa
- Chacho Carreras
- Joseba Apaolaza

== Production ==
The film is an Aiete Films and Ariane Films production. Ruth Gabriel was barely eighteen years old at the time of filming. The film contains several nude scenes of the young actress, who insisted on filming them in the presence of the crew members, in order to give the sequences the greatest authenticity.

== Reception ==
Días contados was nominated for Goya Awards in 19 categories and won for the following:

- Best Actor (Carmelo Gómez)
- Best Director (Imanol Uribe)
- Best Editing (Teresa Font)
- Best Film
- Best New Actress (Ruth Gabriel)
- Best Screenplay – Adapted (Imanol Uribe)
- Best Special Effects (Reyes Abades)
- Best Supporting Actor (Javier Bardem)

== See also ==
- List of Spanish films of 1994
