= Ruth Gabriel =

Spanish actress

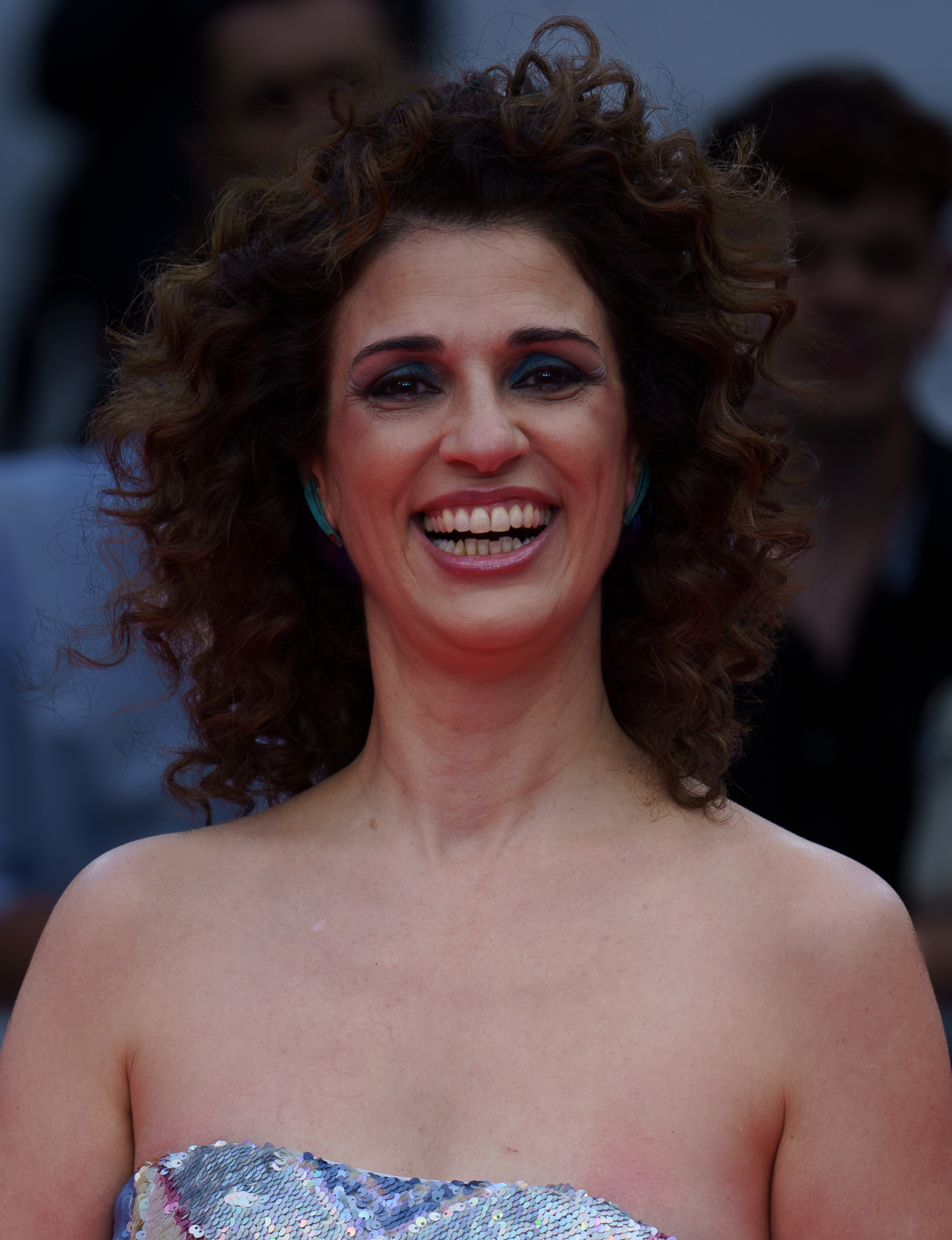
- Gabriel in 2025
- Born: Ruth Sánchez Bueno; 10 July 1975 (age 50); San Fernando, Spain
- Occupation: Actress
- Relatives: Susi Sánchez (aunt)

Ruth Sánchez Bueno (born 10 July 1975), better known as Ruth Gabriel, is a Spanish actress.

== Biography ==
Ruth Sánchez Bueno was born in San Fernando (province of Cádiz) on 10 July 1975, daughter of actor Ismael Abellán and writer Ana Rosetti. Her aunt on her father's side, Susi Sánchez, is also an actress. She spent her childhood in Madrid.

At 14 years of age, she moved to the United States, where she took acting classes. She later continued her education in Florence, Italy, where her mother had moved. Upon returning to Madrid, she continued her artistic development through dance and fencing classes, working as a waiter.

She took the name Ruth Gabriel when she acted in her first film, Días contados by Imanol Uribe. She received the Concha de Oro and the Goya Award for Best New Actress and was nominated for Best Leading Actress.

She acted in Señales de fuego, by the Portuguese Luis Filipe Rocha; Gran Slalom, by Jaime Chávarri; and 99.9, by Agustí Villaronga.

She participated in the first season of the series Querido maestro, with Imanol Arias and Emma Suárez between 1997 and 1998. In 1997, she appeared in Nostromo.

Her first acting job was for the Spanish version of Sesame Street (Barrio Sésamo).

== Filmography ==
=== Film ===
- Días contados (1994), by Imanol Uribe
- Felicidades Tovarich (1995), by Antonio Eceiz
- Señales de fuego (1995), by Luís Filipe Rocha
- A tres bandas (1997), by Enrico Coletti
- 99.9 (1997), by Agustí Villaronga
- Doña Bárbara (1998), by Betty Kaplan
- Sinfín (2002), by Álvaro Olavarría and Alberto Ortiza
- Besos de gato (2003), by Rafael Alcázar
- Historia de Estrella (2003), by Manuel Estudillo
- Lazos rotos (2007), by Miquel García Borda

=== Television ===
- La cometa blanca (1982)
- Barrio Sésamo (1983–1987)
- Querido maestro (1997)
- Nostromo (1997)
- La Mari (2003) (mini-series)

=== Theater ===
- La casa de Bernarda Alba (2006)
