= Cradle Song (1994 film) =

1994 film

- Directed by: José Luis Garci
- Written by: Gregorio Martínez Sierra (play); José Luis Garci
- Starring: Fiorella Faltoyano
- Release date: 15 April 1994
- Running time: 101 minutes
- Country: Spain
- Language: Spanish

Cradle Song (Spanish: Canción de cuna) is a 1994 Spanish drama film directed by José Luis Garci.

It is one of several films based on a successful play by María and Gregorio Martinez Sierra.

== Cast ==
- Fiorella Faltoyano as Madre Teresa
- Alfredo Landa as Don José
- María Massip as Madre Vicaria
- Diana Peñalver as Madre Juana de la Cruz
- Maribel Verdú as Teresa

== Reception ==
The film was selected as the Spanish entry for Best Foreign Language Film at the 67th Academy Awards but was not nominated.

== See also ==
- List of submissions to the 67th Academy Awards for Best Foreign Language Film
- List of Spanish submissions for the Academy Award for Best Foreign Language Film
