= Óscar Ladoire =

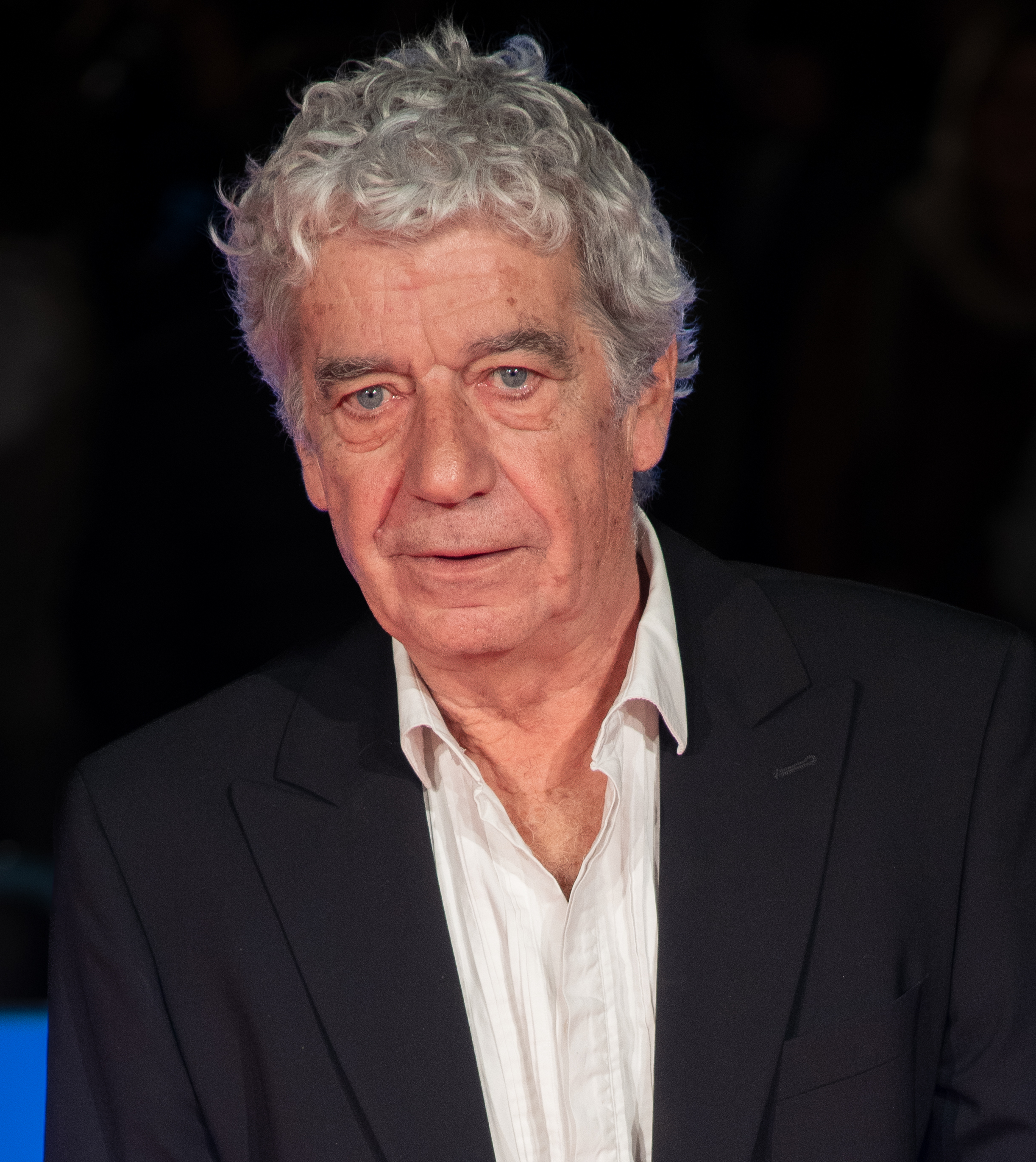
- Ladoire in 2024
- Born: Óscar Ladoire Montero; 1 April 1954 (age 72); Madrid, Spain
- Occupations: Actor; screenwriter; director

Óscar Ladoire Montero (born 1 April 1954) is an actor and filmmaker from Spain. He has developed a film career primarily in supporting roles.

== Life and career ==
Óscar Ladoire Montero was born in Madrid on 1 April 1954. He studied at the Faculty of Information Sciences in Madrid, founding the film magazine Casablanca together with Fernando Trueba and Antonio Resines.

He made his big screen debut as an actor portraying Matías in Ópera prima (1980), directed by Fernando Trueba and co-written by Ladoire. Ladoire and Trueba founded the production company Ópera Films in 1982. He made his directorial debut with A contratiempo (1982), in which he also starred. He has since featured in titles such as Voyage to Nowhere (1986), The Ages of Lulu (1990), Alegre ma non troppo (1994), Off to the Revolution by a 2CV (2001), and We Treat Women Too Well (2024). For his part in Alegre ma non troppo, he earned a nomination for the Goya Award for Best Supporting Actor.

His performance in Friend Zone (2009) won him the Sant Jordi Award for Best Spanish Actor.
