= Cristina Marcos =

Spanish actress

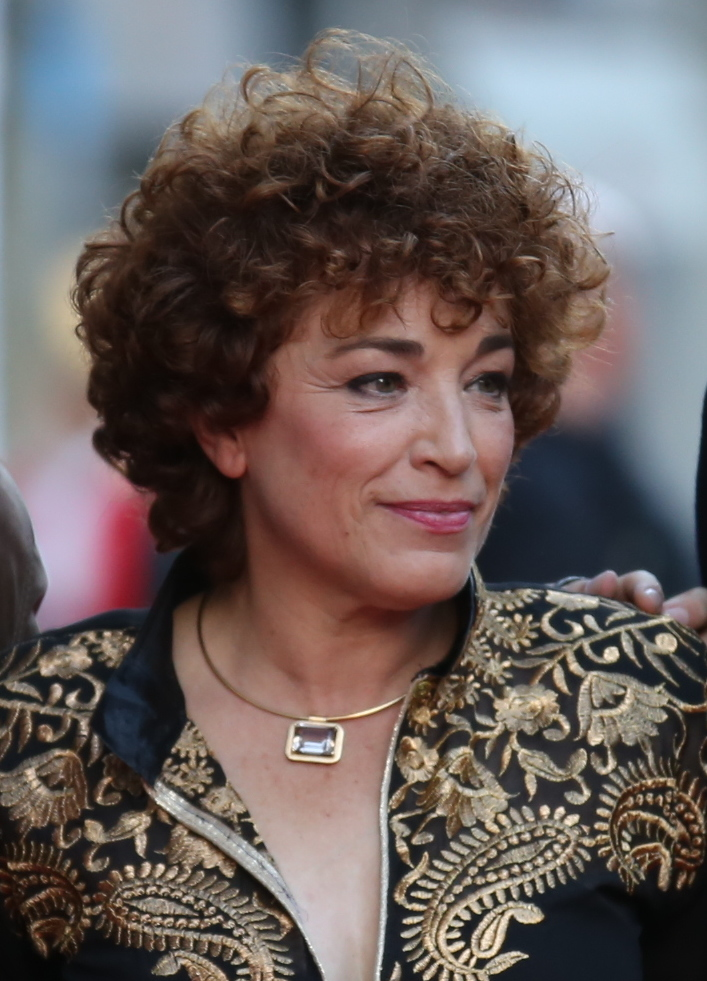
- Born: 19 December 1963 (age 62); Barcelona, Spain
- Occupation: Actress
- Years active: 1981–present

Cristina Marcos (born 19 December 1963) is a Spanish actress. She had her first feature film credit in Maravillas (1981). She won the Goya Award for Best Actress for her performance in All Men Are the Same (1994).

== Early life ==
Cristina Marcos was born in Barcelona on 19 December 1963.

== Selected filmography ==
=== Film ===
Year	Title	Role	Notes	Ref.
1981	Maravillas	Maravillas		
1990	Continental	Anabel		
1991	Tacones lejanos (High Heels)	Paula		
1992	La reina anónima (The Anonymous Queen)	Amante		
1993	La ardilla roja (The Red Squirrel)	Chica de pelo azul		
1994	Todos los hombres sois iguales (All Men Are the Same)	Yoli		
1995	Entre rojas	Julia		
1996	Pon un hombre en tu vida	Belinda		
1997	Corazón loco	Lola		
1997	Mamá es boba	Ana Cooper		
1997	Insomnio (Sleepless in Madrid)	Eva		
2009	La isla interior (The Island Inside)	Gracia		
