= Coque Malla =

Spanish musician and actor (born 1969)

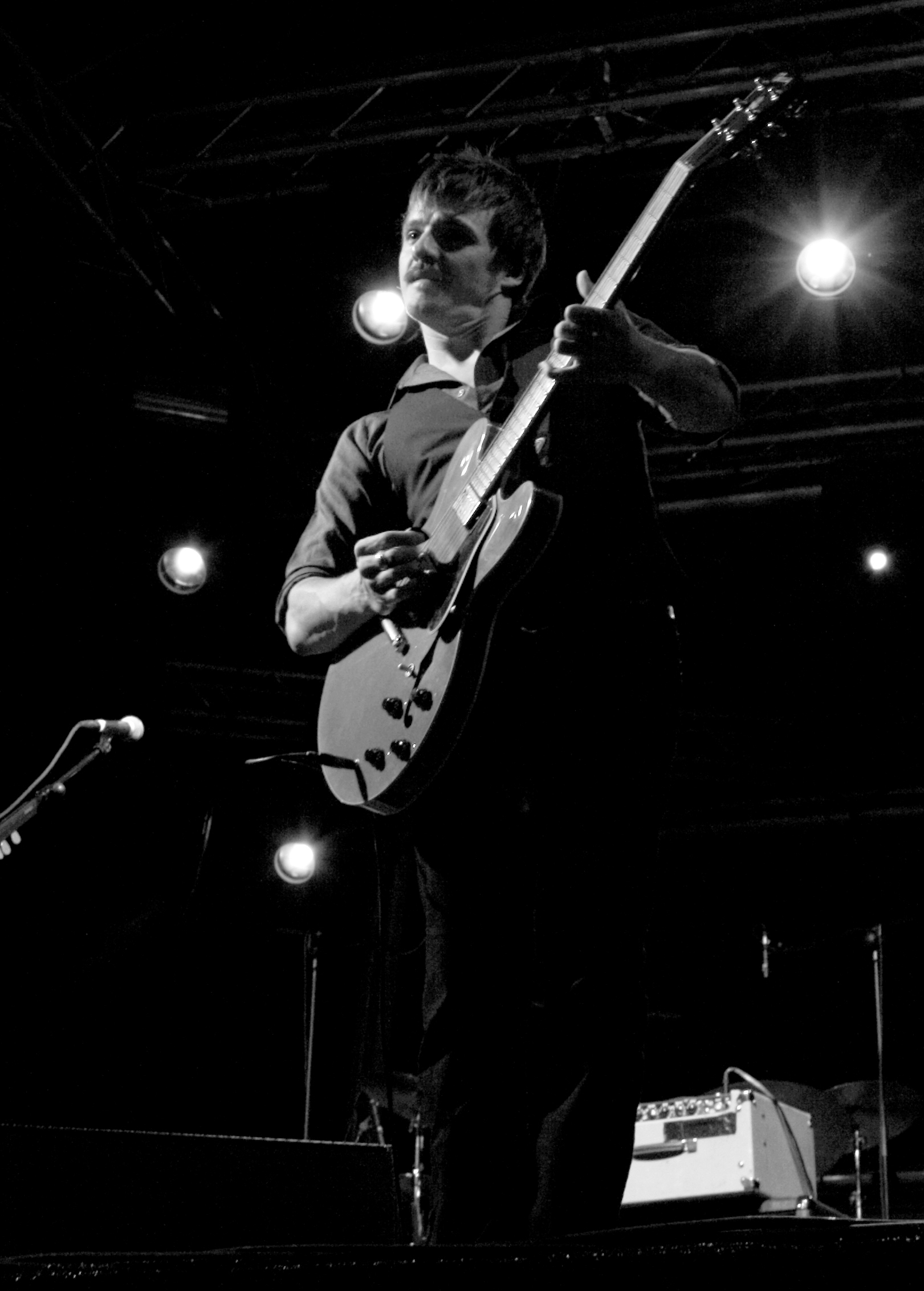
- Born: Jorge Malla Valle; 22 October 1969 (age 56); Madrid, Spain
- Occupations: Musician, actor
- Mother: Amparo Valle
- Musical career
- Genres: Rock
- Instruments: Vocals, guitar
- Years active: 1984–present

Jorge Malla Valle (born 22 October 1969, in Madrid), better known as Coque Malla, is a Spanish musician and actor, frontman of the group Los Ronaldos (founded in 1985). His mother was the actress Amparo Valle, who died on 29 September 2016.

== Biography ==
The son of actor Gerardo Malla and actress Amparo Valle, he was born in Madrid in 1969. At the age of 15, together with Ricardo Moreno, Luis García, and Luis Martín, he formed the rock band Los Ronaldos, in which he was the lead singer, guitarist, and leader.

With Los Ronaldos, he recorded five albums: Los Ronaldos, Saca la lengua, Sabor salado, 0, and Idiota. They achieved great success with songs such as “Adiós papá,” “Quiero más,” “Qué vamos a hacer,” “Por las noches,” etc. Their fame led them to tour Spain, Chile, and even Cuba. The group disbanded in 1998.

From then on, he devoted himself to his solo career and acting.

In 1995, he collaborated on Los Rodríguez's hit song Mucho mejor from the album Palabras más, palabras menos. In 2004, he took on the musical direction of the show El otro lado de la cama, which earned him a nomination for the Premios Max. In 2006, he collaborated with the band Pereza on the album Los amigos de los animales, on the track “Algo para cantar.” In 2007, he collaborated with Ariel Rot on the album Dúos, tríos y otras perversiones, on the track “El tiempo lo dirá.”

In 2007, the original lineup of Los Ronaldos reunited for the release of a new EP entitled 4 canciones, which contained four previously unreleased tracks, including “No puedo vivir sin ti.” The band presented the new songs and polished up the old ones during a tour that summer, which resulted in a new live album in 2008: La bola extra. After the album's release, the band broke up again, and each member, including Malla, went their separate ways.

In 2010, he licensed the song “No puedo vivir sin ti” for an IKEA advertising campaign, which proved so successful that his record label decided to release a single and an EP under the same title, the former with two songs and the latter with five. There are therefore two versions of the song, one an electric version played with his band (Los Ronaldos) and the other a solo acoustic guitar version.

In 2013, he presented his project Mujeres, a CD+DVD in which he reviews his career alongside female voices. Leonor Watling, Jeanette, Ángela Molina, and his own mother, Amparo Valle, among others, accompany Malla on 10 of the 11 tracks on the album.

In 2015, he released a limited edition of Canta a Rubén Blades, a recording made at Café Central in Madrid in June 2012, in which he recreates songs by Rubén Blades.

In 2016, BMW launched the advertisement for its 1 Series car using the song “La hora de los gigantes” (The Hour of the Giants).

In 2018, he recorded “Este es el momento” (This is the moment), the main song from the original soundtrack of Javier Fesser film Campeones (Champions). For this song, he won his first Goya Awards on February 2, 2019. He was previously nominated for Best New Actor in 1995 for the film Todo es mentira (Everything is a Lie).

On January 8, 2022, Coque Malla was one of the singers participating in the charity concert Más fuertes que el volcán (Stronger than the Volcano), which was organized by RTVE to raise funds for the victims of the 2021 volcanic eruption on La Palma.

== Filmography ==
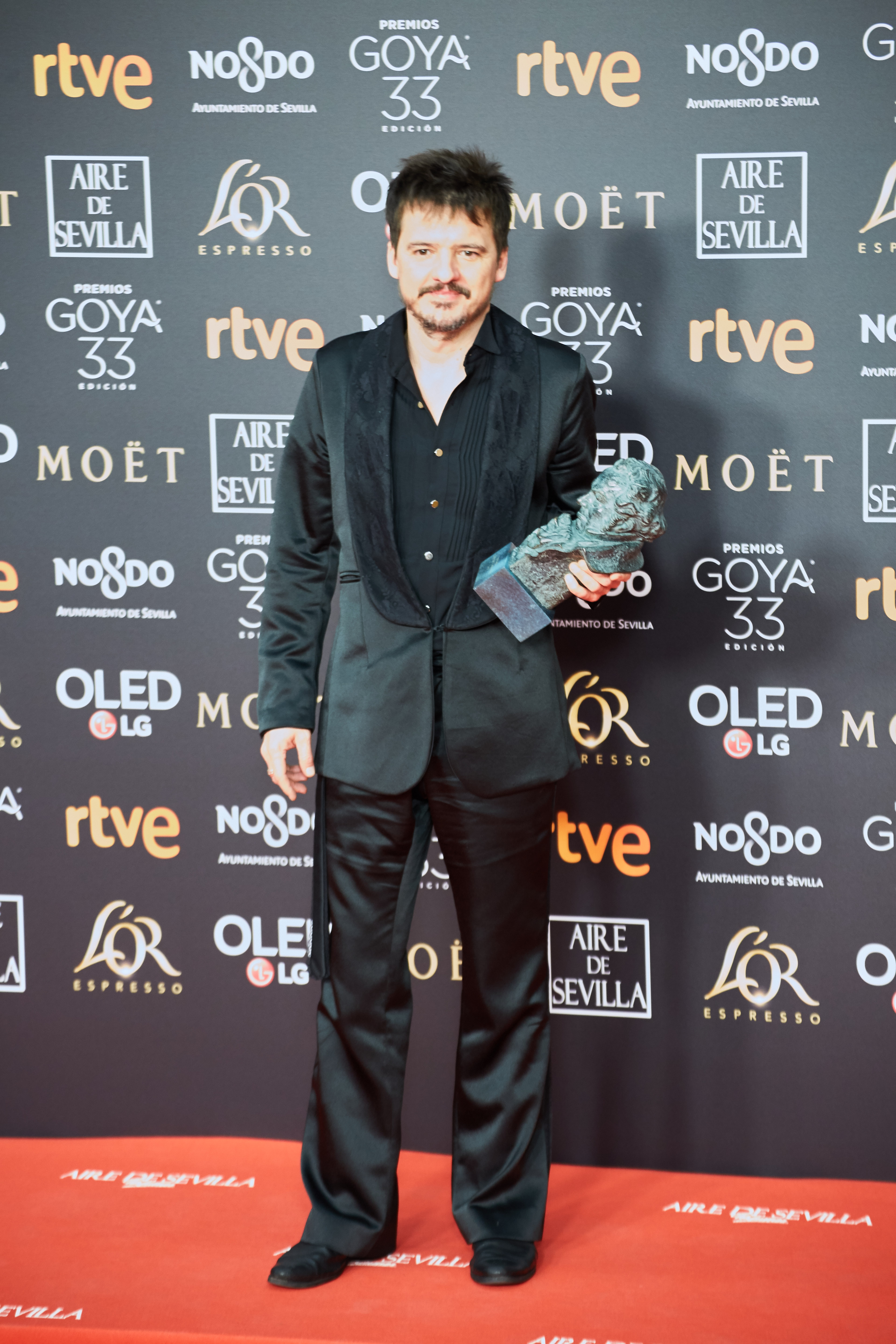
Holding his Goya Award for Champions

He starred in the 1994 film Todo es mentira with Penélope Cruz, and in the 1998 film Nothing in the Fridge alongside María Esteve. He won a Goya Award for Best Original Song ("Este es el momento") in the film Campeones.

== Discography ==
- Soy un astronauta más (1999)
- Sueños (2004)
- La hora de los gigantes (2009)
- La hora de los gigantes – Edición especial (2010)
- Termonuclear (2011)
- Termonuclear en casa de Coque Malla (2011)
- Mujeres (2013) – duets with Leonor Watling, Ángela Molina, Anni B Sweet, Jeanette, Alondra Bentley
- Canta a Rubén Blades (2015)
- El último hombre en la Tierra (2016)
- Irrepetible (2018) – duets with Neil Hannon of the Divine Comedy
- ¿Revolución? (2019)
- El Astronauta Gigante (2021)
- Jorge, una travesía de Coque Malla (2023)
