= Alegre ma non troppo =

1994 film

- Theatrical release poster
- Directed by: Fernando Colomo
- Written by: Fernando Colomo; Joaquín Oristrell
- Produced by: Fernando Colomo; Beatriz de la Gándara
- Starring: Penélope Cruz; Pere Ponce; Óscar Ladoire; Rosa Maria Sardà; Jordi Mollà
- Cinematography: Javier Salmones
- Edited by: Miguel Ángel Santamaría
- Music by: Miguel Arbó; Antonio Cárdenas
- Distributed by: Columbia TriStar Films de España
- Release date: 15 April 1994
- Running time: 97 mins
- Country: Spain
- Language: Spanish

Alegre ma non troppo (Cheerful But Not Too much So) is a 1994 Spanish romance/comedy film directed by Fernando Colomo and starring Penélope Cruz and Jordi Mollà. It was set in Santander, Cantabria, Spain. It was nominated in 1995 for four awards and won two of them.

== Plot ==
Pablo is a twenty-year-old man who wants to be a musician to be appreciated by his mother and to find a male partner he can love. He finds one, but because of his demanding behaviour, is soon alone again. He tries to become a French horn player in the Youth Spain National Orchestra, but the examiner turns out to be his father who's been living apart from his family and doesn't really accept Pablo's sexual trends. Once Pablo fails his exam, he feels depressed. When another French horn player from Valencia hasn't got a place to sleep, Pablo takes him home to his house. The next morning, however, he finds a girl named Salome inside his bed.

== Cast ==
- Penélope Cruz - Salomé
- Pere Ponce - Pablo
- Óscar Ladoire - Pablo Padre
- Rosa Maria Sardà - Asun
- Jordi Mollà - Vicente
- Nathalie Seseña - Izaskun
- Edmon Colomer - Raimon
- Andoni Gracia - Pablo
- Boriana Borisova - Boriana Borisova
- Luis Ciges - Abuelo
- Lola Lemos - Abuela
- Jordi Milán - Psiquiatra
- Daniel Schopfer - James
- Ramón Lillo - Conductor

== Awards ==
- Fotogramas de Plata (1995)
  - Penélope Cruz - Nominated - Best Movie Actress (Mejor Actriz de Cine)
- Goya Awards (1995)
  - Óscar Ladoire - Nominated - Best Supporting Actor (Mejor Actor de Reparto)
- Paris Film Festival (1995)
  - Fernando Colomo - Award for "Special Jury Prize" - Won
- Peñíscola Comedy Film Festival (1994)
  - Pere Ponce - Award for "Best actor" - Won
  - Fernando Colomo, Joaquín Oristrell - Award for "Best Screenplay" - Won
