= Ovejas negras =

- Theatrical release poster
- Directed by: José María Carreño
- Written by: José María Carreño
- Produced by: Gerardo Herrero
- Starring: Maribel Verdú; José Sazatornil "Saza"; Juan Diego Botto; Gabino Diego; Miguel Rellán; Francisco Vidal; Juan José Artero; Concha de Leza
- Cinematography: Antonio Pueche
- Edited by: Nieves Martín
- Music by: Bernardo Bonezzi
- Production company: Tornasol Films
- Distributed by: Golem Distribución
- Release dates: October 1989 (Mostra); 7 May 1990 (Spain)
- Country: Spain
- Language: Spanish

Ovejas negras (lit. 'Black Sheep') is a 1989 Spanish black comedy film written and directed by José María Carreño. The film is a critique of the Catholic education in 1950s Spain. It stars Maribel Verdú, José Sazatornil "Saza", Juan Diego Botto, Gabino Diego, and Miguel Rellán.

== Plot ==
After coming across former teacher Benito, Adolfo de la Cruz remembers his school years as a lonely boy in the 1950s tormented by the perspective of sex, sin, and damnation in hell.

== Cast ==
- Maribel Verdú as Lola
- José Sazatornil "Saza" as Padre Benito
- Juan Diego Botto as Adolfo (boy)
- Miguel Rellán as Adolfo de la Cruz (adult)
- Gabino Diego as Emilio
- Francisco Vidal as Padre Crisóstomo
- Concha de Leza as Sra. de la Cruz
- Juan José Artero as Fernando de la Cruz

== Release ==
Black Sheep was programmed in the official selection of the 10th Mostra de València. As one of the first titles taken over by Golem, it was released theatrically in Spain on 7 May 1990.

== Accolades ==
Year	Award	Category	Nominee(s)	Result	Ref.
1989	10th Mostra de València	Audience Award		Won	
1991	5th Goya Awards	Best New Director	José M.ª Carreño	Nominated	

== See also ==
- List of Spanish films of 1990
