= National Theater Prize =

Cultural prize awarded in Spain

National Theater Award
- Premio Nacional de Teatro
- Sponsored by: Ministry of Culture and Sport
- Country: Spain
- Reward: €30,000

The National Theater Award (Spanish: Premio Nacional de Teatro) is a cultural prize that is awarded annually by the Spanish Ministry of Culture.

It was created in the 1950s and today is awarded annually by the National Institute of Performing Arts and Music. It recognizes and rewards the work of the entirety of an individual's professional life, or outstanding new contributions in the theatrical field.

== Awardees ==
Year	Awardees
1946	Enrique Jardiel Poncela
1949	Mary Carrillo
1952	Miguel Mihura
1954	José López Rubio
1955	Adela Carboné
1957	Antonio Buero Vallejo
1959	Miguel Narros
1960	José Bódalo
1961	Mary Carrillo
1962	Lauro Olmo; Amelia de la Torre; Aurora Redondo; Alberto González Vergel; María Luz Morales; Juan Guerrero Zamora.
1963	Gustavo Pérez Puig
1967	José María Prada
1969	Irene Gutiérrez Caba
1970	Julia Gutiérrez Caba
1971	Antero Guardia
1972	Concha Velasco; José Bódalo; María Fernanda D'Ocón
1973	Manuel Mampaso; Alfredo Mañas
1974	Adolfo Marsillach
1978	Teatre Lliure
1979	Francisco Morales Nieva
1980	Antonio Buero Vallejo; Carmen Carbonell
1981	Rafael Alberti; Guillermo Marín
1982	José Carlos Plaza
1983	Not awarded
1984	Lluís Pasqual; Anna Lizaran
1985	Nuria Espert; Fernando Fernán-Gómez
1986	José Luis Alonso de Santos; Alfonso Sastre
1987	Miguel Narros; Ana Marzoa
1988	José Luis Gómez; Gerardo Vera
1989	Josep Maria Flotats; Emilio Burgos
1990	José Estruch; José Sanchis Sinisterra
1991	Lluís Pasqual; José Pedro Carrión
1992	Berta Riaza; Manuel de Blas
1993	La Fura dels Baus; Ur Teatro
1994	Guillermo Heras; Els Joglars
1995	Teatro de La Abadía
1996	Amparo Rivelles
1997	Nati Mistral
1998	Manuel Galiana
1999	María Jesús Valdés
2000	Ramon Fontserè
2001	Fernando Arrabal
2002	José Luis López Vázquez
2003	Gustavo Pérez Puig
2004	José Monleón
2005	Compañía Animalario
2006	Josep Maria Pou
2007	Juan Mayorga
2008	Atalaya-TNT
2009	Vicky Peña
2010	La Zaranda
2011	Juan Gómez-Cornejo
2012	Blanca Portillo
2013	Ramón Barea
2014	Compañía de teatro Chévere
2015	Pedro Moreno
2016	Concha Velasco
2017	Kamikaze Teatro
2018	Julieta Serrano
2019	Andrés Lima Fernández de Toro
2020	Sala de Teatro Cuarta Pared
2021	Juan Diego Botto
2022	Petra Martínez and Juan Francisco Margallo Rivera
2023	Ana Zamora
2024	Teatro del Barrio
2025	Angélica Liddell
