= Yolanda García Serrano =

Spanish film director and writer

- Born: 1958 (age 67–68); Madrid, Spain
- Occupations: Director, writer
- Children: Cora Tiedra
- Awards: Goya Award for Best Original Screenplay (1994); Lope de Vega Award (2013); National Dramatic Literature Award (2018)

Yolanda García Serrano (born 1958) is a Spanish film director and writer, the winner of the 1994 Goya Award for Best Original Screenplay for the film All Men Are the Same.

== Biography ==
García studied Public Relations and worked for a few years as a secretary while starting her studies in Dramatic Arts. She immediately began to participate in a theater group and to write small works, first for the children's audience and then for adults. She studied dramatic writing with Fermín Cabal, José Luis Alonso de Santos, and Jesús Campos, and later studied audiovisual and cinematographic narrative, as well as film direction. She then began writing for film, television, and theater.

In 1986, and within a dramaturgy workshop of the National Center of New Trends, her play La llamada es del todo inadecuada was selected along with two others to be performed at the Círculo de Bellas Artes in Madrid. It was a completely new project in Spanish drama with a work framed in the theater of the absurd. She began working in cinematic screenwriting with Joaquín Oristrell, Lola Salvador, and Manolo Matji, but despite having gone through specialized schools with American and Hispanic writers, García confesses that she learned the trade by writing, reading, going a lot to the movies, "and throwing many scripts to the basket." Later she also went on to teach at the Community of Madrid's Cinematography and Audiovisual School.

In 1988, she began her career as a professional screenwriter with works for film, television programs, and series. From the beginning she formed a team working in collaboration with Manuel Gómez Pereira, Juan Luis Iborra, and Joaquín Oristrell. In 1994, and in collaboration with them, she won the Goya Award for Best Original Screenplay for All Men Are the Same. Among the series she has written for are Farmacia de guardia (1991–1995), Abuela de verano (2005), Clara Campoamor, and Fugitiva (2018). In movies, she wrote Why Do They Call It Love When They Mean Sex? (1993), Love Can Seriously Damage Your Health (1997), Queens (2005), and Mediterranean Food (2008).

In 1997, García directed and wrote the screenplay for Amor de hombre with Juan Luis Iborra, which she later turned into a novel. The film won the 1st Award for the best film of the L.A. Gay & Lesbian Film Festival. After ten years removed from the scene, she returned in 1998 with a comedy about marriage, written specifically for three actresses – Carmen Balagué, Elisa Matilla, and Rosario Santesmases – entitled Qué asco de amor. She received the Hogar Sur de Teatro de Comedias Award, organized by the Pedro Muñoz Seca Foundation. With Dónde pongo la cabeza, released in 2006, she won the Chivas Telón Award.

In 2000, again together with Juan Luis Iborra, she directed and wrote Km. 0, winner for the best film of the Torino Film Festival. Two years later, she premiered her first solo film, the family comedy Hasta aquí hemos llegado (2002). Her play Ser o no ser Cervantes, premiered in New York in 2010, won three Hispanic Organization of Latin Actors (HOLA) Awards. In 2011 she was the first Spanish woman to premiere and direct her own play in New York: Good sex. Good day. Lo que ellos ignoran de ellas. Along with Juan Carlos Rubio, she received the 2013 Lope de Vega Award for a work not yet released: Shakespeare nunca estuvo aquí. In 2013, she was commissioned as artistic director of the Premios Max gala, presented that year by actor Álex O'Dogherty.

García has always worked in the field of comedy, which was for her a way to face and overcome the most dramatic reality, until in 2016 she premiered her first drama, ¡Corre!, in collaboration with Joaquín Oristrell. This was based on her own experience, as she explained in an interview conducted by Pepa Fernández on the Radio Nacional de España program No es un día cualquiera in October 2017. With this work she won the National Dramatic Literature Award of Spain in 2018.

In 2017 she was a finalist in the 1st Teatro Español Playwriting Tournament with her work Parapeto, eventually losing to Ignacio del Moral. She has also made incursions into micro-theater with the play La novia de nuestro hijo no es nuestra hija.

Some of García's cinematic works feature leading or supporting performances by her daughter Cora Tiedra, who has also appeared on some television series.

== Works ==
- 1991 – Salsa rosa
- 1994 – Todos los hombres sois iguales
- 1997 – Amor de hombre
- 2000 – Km. 0
- 2002 – Hasta aquí hemos llegado

=== Television ===
- 1991–1995 – Farmacia de Guardia
- 2005 – Abuela de verano
- 2018 – Fugitiva

=== Books ===
- 1993 – Línea caliente
- 1997 – Amor de hombre, novel based on the author's film script in collaboration with Juan Luis Iborra
- 2000 – Siempre me enamoro del hombre equivocado
- 2001 – De qué va eso del amor, in co-authorship with Verónica Fernández Rodríguez
- 2004 – Mujer casada busca gente que la lleve al cine
- 2007 – Descalza por la vida, in co-authorship with Verónica Fernández Rodríguez

=== Theater ===
- 1986 – La llamada es del todo inadecuada
- 1998 – Qué asco de amor
- 2007 – Dónde pongo la cabeza
- 2013 – Shakespeare nunca estuvo aquí, in co-authorship with Juan Carlos Rubio, Lope de Vega Award winner
- 2016 – ¡Corre!, in collaboration with Joaquín Oristrell
