= Josep Maria Miró =

Catalan playwright

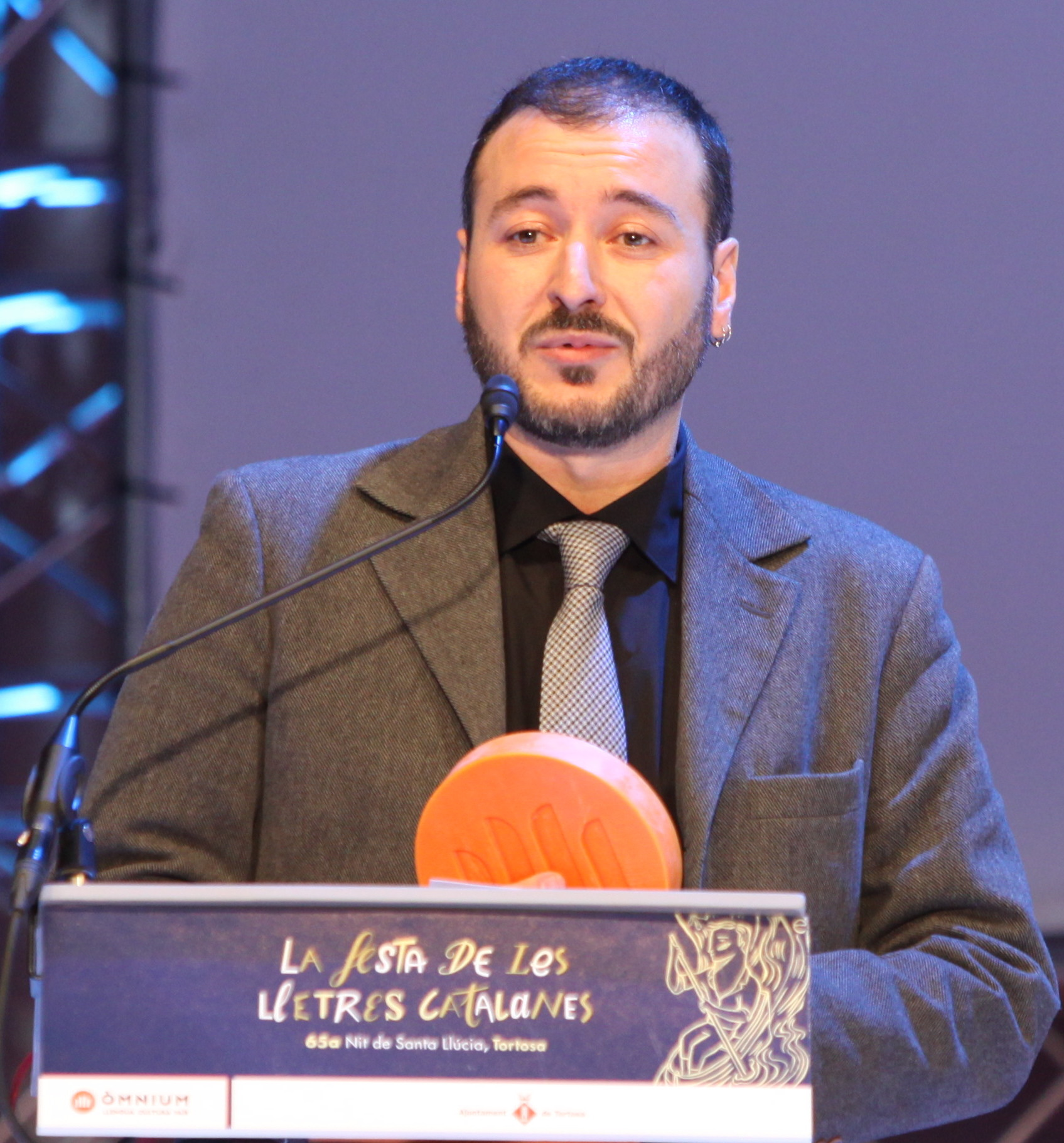
- Josep Maria Miró in 2015
- Born: 1977 (age 48–49); Prats de Lluçanès, Barcelona
- Education: Theater Institute of Barcelona, Autonomous University of Barcelona
- Occupations: Playwright and Theater Director
- Writing career
- Language: Catalan
- Period: 2009-Present
- Notable works: Archimedes’ Principle; Nerium Park; The Nicest Body Ever Seen Around These Parts
- Notable awards: Theater Born Award (2009, 2011, 2020); Max Award for Best Theatrical Author (2019); Spanish National Dramatic Literature Award (2022)
- Website: josepmariamiro.com

Josep Maria Miró (Prats de Lluçanès, Barcelona, 1977) is a playwright and theater director from Catalonia. He is known by plays such as Archimedes’ Principle, Nerium Park or The Nicest Body Ever Seen Around These Parts. He writes his plays in Catalan language.

== Biography ==
Josep Maria Miró graduated in Direction and Dramaturgy from the Theater Institute of Barcelona and in Journalism from the Autonomous University of Barcelona (UAB.).

His plays have been translated into over twenty languages, with approximately 100 world premieres and numerous publications. He has also undertaken various dramaturgies and stage adaptations.

He has directed both his own plays and works by other authors, including El carrer Franklin (Franklin Street) by Lluïsa Cunillé, La voix humaine by Jean Cocteau/Francis Poulenc, and productions for the series Liturgical Dramas at the Monastery of Santa Maria de l'Estany in 2009, 2010, and 2011.

In 2022, Miró received the Spanish National Dramatic Literature Award, granted by Spanish Ministry of Culture for his play The Nicest Body Ever Seen Around These Parts. . In 2020, he won the XLV Theater Born Award for the same text, making him the first author in the history of the prestigious award to win it three times (previously in 2011 with Archimedes’ Principle and in 2009 with The Woman Who Always Missed Her Flight). Among his numerous other awards are the Max Award 2019 for Best Theatrical Author for A Nice Place, the XIV Rosalía de Castro Award 2022 for his career in Catalan literature, and the Jardiel Poncela Award 2023 for his play The Monster, granted by the Spanish Society of Authors and Publishers SGAE.

His play Archimedes’ Principle, with over fifty productions worldwide, has been adapted into film twice: El virus de la por (The Virus of Fear) (2015) by Catalan production company Els Films La Rambla directed by Ventura Pons , and Aos teus olhos (Liquid Truth) (2017) by Brazilian production company Globo directed by Carolina Jabor.

In 2017, Sala Beckett of Barcelona organized a series dedicated to "The Theatre of Josep Maria Miró," and in 2024, La Abadía theater of Madrid programmed a series of his works under the title "Miro’s Universe."

Starting in 2015-16 academic year, Miró joined the faculty at the ERAM, the undergraduate degree program in Performing Arts at the University of Girona, where he still coordinates the academic section devoted to Dramaturgy. He regularly teaches courses and workshops at the Obrador of Sala Beckett in Barcelona, as well as numerous workshops and seminars, both in Catalonia and abroad. In 2023 he was awarded with a residency in New York City by the Ramon Llull Foundation .

== Plays ==
- La dona que perdia tots els avions (The Woman Who Always Missed Her Flight, English translation by Dustin Langan) (2009.)
- Gang Bang: Obert fins l’hora de l’Àngelus (Gang Bang: Open until the Angelus) (2010-2011.)
- El principi d’Arquimedes (Archimedes’ Principle, English translation by Dustin Langan) (2011.) ISBN 978-1-910067-13-0
- Nerium Park (Nerium Park, English translation by Sharon G. Feldman) (2012.)
- Fum (Smoke, English translation by Dustin Langan) (2012.)
- Estripar la terra (Tearing Up the Earth) (2013.)
- Obac (Shady) (2014.)
- La travessia (The Passage, English translation by Sharon G. Feldman) (2015.)
- Cúbit (Ulna) (2016.)
- Olvidémonos de ser turistas (Let’s Forget about Being Tourists) (2017.)
- Temps salvatge (A Nice Place, English translation by Sharon G. Feldman) (2017.)
- L’habitació blanca (The White Room) (2020.)
- El cos més bonic que s’haurà trobat mai en aquest lloc (The Nicest Body Every Seen Around These Parts, English translation by Sharon G. Feldman) (2020.)
- La majordoma (The Lady Butler) (2020.)
- Restos del fulgor nocturno (Remains of the Glowing Night) (2021.)
- El monstre (The Monster, English translation by Sharon G. Feldman) (2023.)
- Jo, travesti (Me, Trans) (2023.)
- El cadell (The heir) (2025-26.)

== Short Texts ==
- El col·laborador (The collaborator) (2014.) Short piece part of the show Mensonges organized by Fréderig Sonntag and Verónique Bellegarde.
- No és ben bé això (It's not exactly the same) (2014.) Short piece for the show Llibràlegs, based on Jordi Prat i Coll's idea of short pieces designed to be represented in bookstores/libraries.
- Rai (2016). Short piece for the charity show “From Damasc to Idomeni” organized by Barcelona Playwrights, Proactiva Open Arms and the Teatre Lliure of Barcelona.
- Desenfocat (Out of focus) (2019.) Brief piece within the activities programmed by the Sala Beckett in Barcelona on the 30th anniversary of the death of Samuel Beckett.
- Jo (Me) (2019.) Short piece for the project “The end of tolerance” of the European program Fabulamundi.
- Cor de pollastre (Chicken heart) (2020.) Short piece written for the Mousson d'Été 2020.
- Transhumance (Trashumancy) (2022.) Radio piece for “Històries de l’altra bana” by “Sala 4” of Ràdio 4 (Radio Nacional de España) / Sala Beckett.
- Alexandre (ocell de golfa) (Alexandre (attic bird)) (2023.)

== Dramaturgies and Adaptations ==
- Cocaine, absenta, pastillas de valda and cafè amb llet (Cocaine, absenta, pastillas de valda and coffee with milk) (2009), from texts by various authors.
- 5 contes diferents (5 different stories) (2010-2011.)
- Com si entrés en una pàtria (As if you entered a country) (2010), based on texts by Joan Maragall.
- Los libres cautiverios de Ricardo y Leonisa (The free captivities of Ricardo and Leonisa) (2014), inspired on The Liberal Lover, one of the Novelas ejemplares by Miguel de Cervantes.
- Esperança Dinamita, de cuplés i cançons de revista (Esperança Dinamita: couplets and songs from the varietés) (2014), based on couplets and other materials from this popular genre and Barcelona nightlife from the first three decades of the 20th century.
- Neus Català, un cel de plom (Neus Català, a leaden sky, English translation by Helena Buffery) (2015), based on the novel by Carme Martí and various documentary materials about Neus Català.
- L'aplec del Remei (The Gathering for Our Lady of Good Remedy) (2016), based on the zarzuela by Josep Anselm Clavé.
- An aquell temps que ets animals parlaven (Upon that time when the animals talked) (2019) based on popular Mallorca stories.
- L'amic retrobat (Reunion) (2019), based on the homonymous novel by Fred Uhlman.
- Els homes i els dies (Men and days) (2022), from the complete narrative work of David Vilaseca.
- Reis del món (Kings of the world) (2023), based on the homonymous novel by Sebastià Alzamora.
- Sicalíptiques (2025.)
- Invisible (Invisible) (2025-26.) Adaptation for the theater company "La Joven" based on the homonymous novel by Eloy Moreno.

== Awards ==
- Theater Born Award 2009 for The Woman Who Always Missed Her Flight.
- Theater Born Award 2011 for Archimedes’ Principle.
- VII Quim Masó Award 2013 for theater project for Nerium Park.
- Jaume Vidal i Alcover Ciutat de Manacor Award 2013 for Nerium Park
- Frederic Roda Awards (Ex aequo) at the LXV Nit de Santa Llúcia – Festa de les Lletres Catalanes 2016 for The Passage .
- Max Award for the Performing Arts in the category of Best Theatrical Author 2019 for A Nice Place.
- Theater Born Award 2020 for The Nicest Body Every Seen Around These Parts.
- Spanish National Dramatic Literature Award 2022, granted by the Spanish Ministry of Culture for The Nicest Body Every Seen Around These Parts
- Enrique Jardiel Poncela Award 2023, granted by the Spanish Society of Authors and Publishers SGAE for The Monster.
- Quim Masó Award 2023, for The Monster.
