= Lluïsa Cunillé =

Spanish playwright

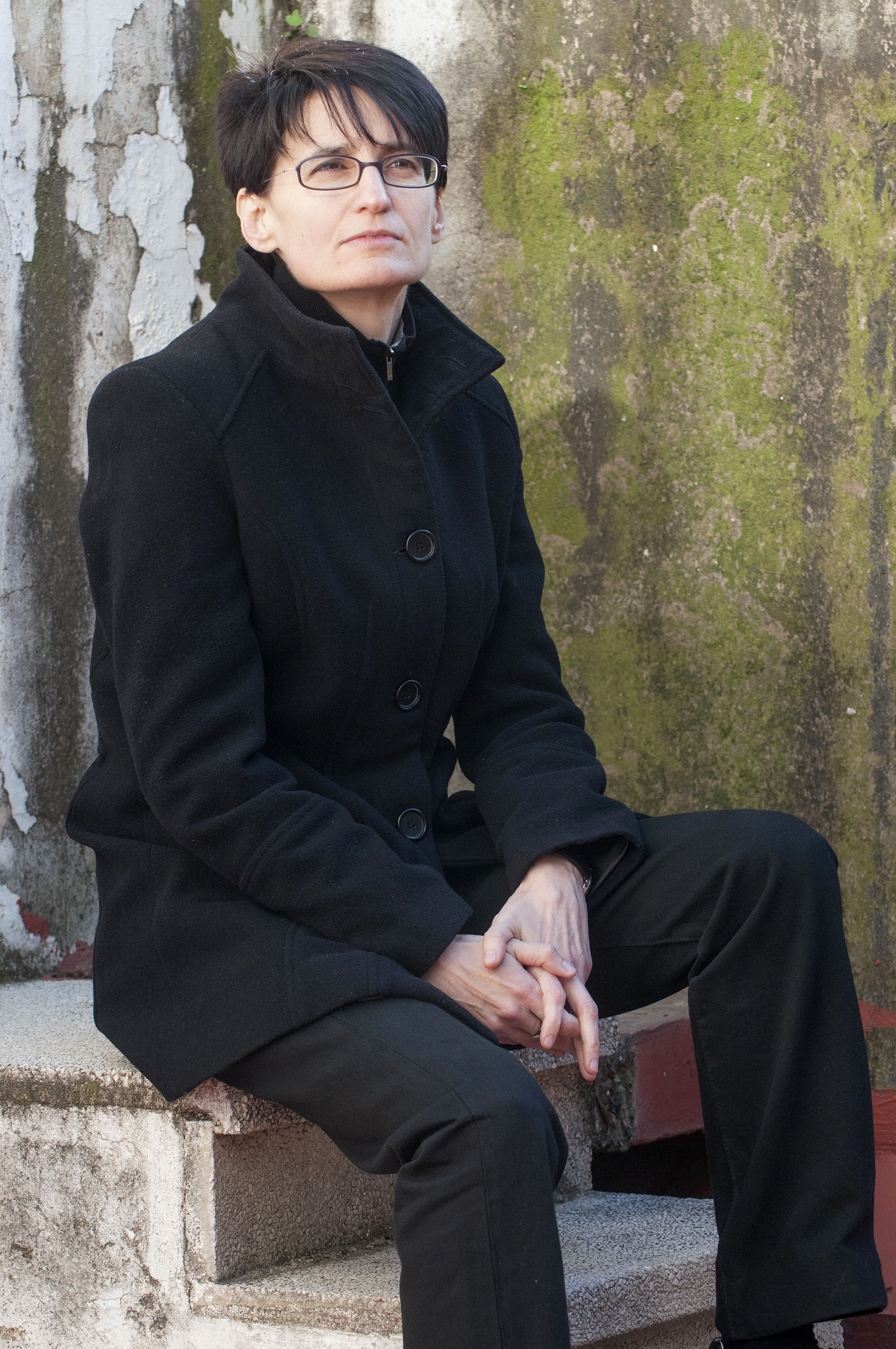
- Lluïsa Cunillé (2014)
- Born: 1961; Badalona, Spain
- Occupation: playwright
- Language: Spanish; Catalan
- Notable awards: National Dramatic Literature Award

Lluïsa Cunillé Salgado (Badalona, 1961) is a Spanish playwright who writes in Spanish and Catalan. In 2010, she became the first woman to be awarded the National Dramatic Literature Award by the Spanish Ministry of Culture.

== Biography ==
Lluïsa Cunillé Salgado was born in 1961.

A student of the playwright José Sanchis Sinisterra, she trained in the textual dramaturgy seminars given by him at the Sala Beckett in Barcelona between 1990 and 1993. In 1991, she won the runners-up prize for the Ignasi Iglésias Award for Bern and the Calderón de la Barca Award for Rodeo (premiered in 1992).

Cunillé founded the company L'Hongaresa in 1993 together with the playwright and stage director Paco Zarzoso and the actress and director Lola López. In collaboration with Paco Zarzoso, she has written and premiered Intempèrie (1996), Viajeras (2001), and Húngaros (2002). Cunillé was one of fifteen authors who wrote the production Sopa de Radio, a programme with which Cadena SER commemorated the 75th anniversary of the birth of radio in Spain.

Cunillé premiered numerous theatrical works in Catalan and in Spanish: Molt novembre (1993), La festa (1994), Libración (1994, Barcelona Critics Award 1993–1994), Accident (1996, Award of the Institution of Lletres Catalanes, 1997), Apocalipsi (1998), The affair (1999, Ciutat d'Alcoi Award 1998), La cita (1999), Passage Gutenberg (2000, Barcelona Critic Award 1999–2000), Vacants (2000 ), El gat negre (2001), L'anniversari (2001, Premi Born de Teatre 1999), and Aquel aire infinito (2003), Barcelona, mapa d'ombres (2004), among many others. She won, among others, the Ciutat de Lleida theatre award (1997) with Doze treballs; the Premio Ciudad de Barcelona (2005) with Barcelona, mapa d'ombres; the Premios Max Award for the best playwright in Spanish (2007) also for Barcelona, mapa d'ombres; the Lletra D'Or Award (2008) for Après moi, le déluge. The Generalitat de Catalunya awarded her the Premio Nacional de Teatro de Cataluña in 2007. Her play "Liberation" is featured in Plays by Mediterranean Women (1994, Aurora Metro Books).
