= Grancha =

Grancha is a surname. Notable people with this surname include:

- Alberto Miralles Grancha (1940–2004), Spanish dramatist
- Maria João Monteiro Grancha (born 1956), Portuguese jazz singer
