= ¡Ay, Carmela! =

- Theatrical release poster
- Directed by: Carlos Saura
- Written by: Carlos Saura; Rafael Azcona
- Based on: ¡Ay, Carmela! by José Sanchis Sinisterra
- Produced by: Andrés Vicente Gómez
- Starring: Carmen Maura; Andrés Pajares; Gabino Diego
- Cinematography: José Luis Alcaine
- Edited by: Pablo G. del Amo
- Music by: Alejandro Massó
- Production companies: Iberoamericana Films; Ellepi
- Distributed by: United International Pictures
- Release date: 16 March 1990
- Running time: 102 minutes
- Countries: Spain; Italy
- Language: Spanish

¡Ay, Carmela! is a 1990 comedy-drama film directed by Carlos Saura and co-written by Rafael Azcona based on the eponymous play by José Sanchís Sinisterra. The film stars Carmen Maura, Andrés Pajares, and Gabino Diego as travelling players performing for the Spanish Republic, who inadvertently find themselves on the Nationalist side during the closing months of the Civil War. The film was selected as the Spanish entry for the Best Foreign Language Film at the 63rd Academy Awards, but was not accepted as a nominee.

== Plot ==
Carmela, Paulino, and Gustavete (who is mute) are vaudeville performers, touring Spain during the Spanish Civil War. In 1938, in the town of Montejo, they give a show to Republican troops. During the performance, Nationalist planes drone overhead, but no one leaves the theatre. Carmela sings and dances, Paulino reads a poem by Antonio Machado (which reflects Republican patriotic fervour) and plays a tune with his farts. The final act is a 'tableau vivant' in which Carmela represents justice while Paulino brandishes the Republican flag and they sing a song of freedom.

To escape the dangers of the front line, the trio decide to go to Valencia. Carmela distracts a Republican truck driver by allowing him to paw her, while Paulino and Gustavete steal the fuel. However the night is misty and they stray into Nationalist territory. When a Nationalist officer finds the Republican flag in their props, they are arrested and taken to the local school, which serves as a prison for Republican sympathisers. Carmela befriends a Polish member of the International Brigade. She is amazed that he has come to fight in a foreign land whose name he cannot even pronounce.

After some of the prisoners are taken away to be shot, Carmela, Paulino and Gustavete are driven away in an army car. They are convinced they will also be shot, but instead they are taken to the local theatre. An Italian officer, Lieutenant Amelio di Ripamonte, wants them to appear in a show to entertain the nationalist troops. They must stage a burlesque of the Republic in exchange for their freedom.

Paulino starts rewriting their old script to make their numbers anti-Republican. Carmela refuses to go along with it, unwilling to betray her convictions as an anti-fascist, but Paulino persuades her they have no choice, since their lives are at stake.

On the day of the show, Carmela has her period, and Paulino has an upset stomach from eating a rabbit, which Gustavete, writing on his slate, confirms was a cat. Carmela is greatly upset to see the Polish prisoners in the audience, brought in to witness a mockery of their ideals. Structurally, the show is similar to their old one. Musical numbers are followed by a poem, now read by the lieutenant. The third act is a comic sketch, ‘The Republic goes to the Doctor’. Paulino plays a gay Republican doctor who is visited by a female patient, the Spanish Republic, played by Carmela. She claims she has been made pregnant by a Russian lover, played by Gustavete. In a number that exploits all the sexual innuendos the audience cares to imagine, Carmela invites the doctor to insert his thermometer in her. He refuses, making the excuse that it is broken.

Carmela is deeply distressed at being forced to betray the Republic in front of the Polish soldiers. Her frustration seethes to the surface, jeopardizing the credibility of the parody. The sketch disintegrates as the Polish soldiers rise in rebellion in the galleries and the Fascists become infuriated. Carmela starts singing 'Ay Carmela' and lowers the Republican flag to expose her breasts in defiance of the earlier cries of 'Whore!' from the audience. A Nationalist officer rises from the stalls, raises a pistol and shoots Carmela in the forehead. Gustavete suddenly recovers his voice, calling out in anguish, but Carmela falls to the floor dead.

The next scene shows Paulino and Gustavete visiting Carmela's rudimentary grave, which they decorate with flowers and the Gustavete chalk board, no longer needed now that he has recovered his voice. The only words here are spoken by Gustavete – "Come on, Paulino" – as he leads him away. The two men take to the road again, and the song "¡Ay Carmela!" is heard in the background.

== Cast ==
- Carmen Maura as Carmela
- Andrés Pajares as Paulino
- Gabino Diego as Gustavete
- Maurizio De Razza as teniente Ripamonte ('Lieutenant Ripamonte')
- José Sancho as capitán ('captain')
- Edward Żentara as soldado polaco ('Polish soldier')
- Miguel Ángel Rellán as teniente interrogador ('interrogating lieutenant')

== Production ==
The film is a Spanish-Italian co-production.

Principal photography began from 26 September 1989 to 25 November 1989. Made in 1990, ¡Ay Carmela! was director Carlos Saura's twenty-third feature-length film. In Saura's earlier films, allusions to the war and to its consequences were characterized by violence and brutality, and if there was any humour at all it was grim and ironic. Of ¡Ay Carmela! he said, "I would have been incapable a few years ago of treating our war with humour… but now it is different, for sufficient time has passed to adopt a broader perspective, and here there is no doubt that by employing humour it is possible to say things that it would be more difficult, if not impossible, to say in another way".

The film is based on the play of the same name by the Valencian dramatist, José Sanchís Sinisterra. The play was a success in Spain and was translated to English and staged in London. The play focuses entirely on the two principal characters, Carmela and Paulino, and tells their story largely in flashback. When it begins, Paulino is alone and depressed, for Carmela is already dead, the victim of a fascist bullet at their last performance as variety artist. In the first part of the play Carmela returns as a ghost to converse with Paulino, blaming him for all that has happened, and in the second part evokes in detail the fatal performance. The play contains only two characters and a single setting. Saura adapted the play with the help of scriptwriter Rafael Azcona, who had worked with him many times before but with whom he had broken in 1975 before making Cria Cuervos.

Saura opened up the story and presented it not in flashback but in a linear manner. This allowed him to follow the journey of Carmela and Paulino during the two days in which they travel from Republican to Nationalist territory, performing their act in both camps. It also allowed much more scope for the relationship and the characters of Carmela and Paulino to evolve and in relation to the events in which they find themselves caught up. It also enabled Saura to depict other characters and locations mentioned in the play, in particular Gustavete, the travelling companion of Carmela and Paulino, and the Italian officer and theatre director, Lieutenant Amelio di Ripamonte. The town where the action occurs and the theatre in which the final third of the film is located are also depicted. Some artistic resonance evoke memories of Ernst Lubitsch's 1942 comedy To Be or Not to Be.

The film takes its title from the song "Ay Carmela", which begins and ends the film. Originally a song from the War of Independence against Napoleon, it had been adapted and became the favourite song of the Republican soldiers and of the International Brigade during the Spanish Civil War.

== Release ==
¡Ay Carmela! was released theatrically in Spain on 16 March 1990.

The film was made available for a home release in Region 2 DVD in Spanish with English and French subtitles.

== Accolades ==
Year	Award	Category	Nominee(s)	Result	Ref.
1991	5th Goya Awards	Best Film		Won	
1991	5th Goya Awards	Best Director	Carlos Saura	Won	
1991	5th Goya Awards	Best Actor	Andrés Pajares	Won	
1991	5th Goya Awards	Best Actress	Carmen Maura	Won	
1991	5th Goya Awards	Best Adapted Screenplay	Carlos Saura, Rafael Azcona	Won	
1991	5th Goya Awards	Best Supporting Actor	Gabino Diego	Won	
1991	5th Goya Awards	Best Cinematography	José Luis Alcaine	Nominated	
1991	5th Goya Awards	Best Editing	Pablo González del Amo	Won	
1991	5th Goya Awards	Best Original Score	Alejandro Massó	Nominated	
1991	5th Goya Awards	Best Sound	Gilles Ortion, Alfonso Pino	Won	
1991	5th Goya Awards	Best Costume Design	Rafael Palmero, Mercedes Sánchez Rau	Won	
1991	5th Goya Awards	Best Makeup and Hairstyles	José Antonio Sánchez, Paquita Núñez	Won	
1991	5th Goya Awards	Best Art Direction	Rafael Palmero	Won	
1991	5th Goya Awards	Best Production Supervision	Víctor Albarrán	Won	
1991	5th Goya Awards	Best Special Effects	Reyes Abades	Won	

== See also ==
- List of Spanish films of 1990
- List of submissions to the 63rd Academy Awards for Best Foreign Language Film
- List of Spanish submissions for the Academy Award for Best Foreign Language Film
