= List of Spanish films of the 1990s =

Films produced in Spain in the 1990s ordered by year of release on separate pages:

== List of films by year ==
- Spanish films of 1990
- Spanish films of 1991
- Spanish films of 1992
- Spanish films of 1993
- Spanish films of 1994
- Spanish films of 1995
- Spanish films of 1996
- Spanish films of 1997
- Spanish films of 1998
- Spanish films of 1999
