= List of Spanish films of 1990 =

A list of Spanish-produced and co-produced feature films released in Spain in 1990.

== Films ==
Release		Title (Domestic title)	Cast & Crew	Ref.
J A N U A R Y	24	Twisted Obsession (El sueño del mono loco)	Director: Fernando Trueba Cast: Jeff Goldblum, Miranda Richardson, Anémone, Dexter Fletcher, Daniel Ceccaldi, Liza Walker	
J A N U A R Y	26	Tie Me Up! Tie Me Down! (¡Átame!)	Director: Pedro Almodóvar Cast: Victoria Abril, Antonio Banderas	(Note: One of the first NC17 rated films, entered into the 40th Berlin International Film Festival)
J A N U A R Y	26	Aquí huele a muerto... (pues yo no he sido)	Director: Álvaro Sáenz de Heredia Cast: Martes y Trece	
M A R C H	1	Warsaw Bridge (Pont de Varsòvia)	Director: Pere Portabella Cast: Carmen Elías, Francisco Guíjar, Jaume Comas, Jordi Dauder, José María Pou	
M A R C H	2	Disparate nacional	Director: Mariano Ozores Cast: Antonio Ozores, Óscar Ladoire, Antonio Resines, Fabiola Toledo	
M A R C H	9	The Rift (La grieta)	Director: Juan Piquer Simón Cast: Jack Scalia, Lee R. Ermey, Ray Wise, Deborah Adair, John Toles Bey, Ely Pouget	
M A R C H	16	¡Ay, Carmela!	Director: Carlos Saura Cast: Carmen Maura, Andrés Pajares, Gabino Diego	(Note: Spanish Civil War; Goya Awards winner. Based on a successful theatre play)
M A Y	7	Ovejas negras	Director: José María Carreño Cast: Maribel Verdú, José Sazatornil, Miguel Rellán, Juan Diego Botto, Gabino Diego, Juanjo Artero	
M A Y	25	la sombra del ciprés es alargada	Director: Luis Alcoriza Cast: Emilio Gutiérrez Caba, Fiorella Faltoyano, Juanjo Guerenabarrena, Dany Prius, María Rojo, Julián Pastor	
A U G U S T	24	Don Juan, My Dear Ghost (Don Juan, mi querido fantasma)	Director: Antonio Mercero Cast: Juan Luis Galiardo, María Barranco, Loles León, José Sazatornil, Verónica Forqué, Rossy de Palma, Rafael Álvarez	
S E P T E M B E R	7	Alone Together (A solas contigo)	Director: Eduardo Campoy Cast: Victoria Abril, Imanol Arias, Juan Echanove, Nacho Martínez, Conrado San Martín, Emma Suárez	
S E P T E M B E R	28	Letters from Alou (Las cartas de Alou)	Director: Montxo Armendáriz Cast: Mulie Jarju	
O C T O B E R	5	Yo soy esa	Director: Luis Sanz Cast: Isabel Pantoja, José Coronado	
O C T O B E R	12	Against the Wind (Contra el viento)	Director: Paco Periñán Cast: Antonio Banderas, Emma Suárez, Rosario Flores	
N O V E M B E R	16	Innisfree	Director: José Luis Guerín	(Note: Screened at the 1990 Cannes Film Festival)
D E C E M B E R	5	The Ages of Lulu (Las edades de Lulú)	Director: Bigas Luna Cast: Francesca Neri, Óscar Ladoire, María Barranco, Fernando Guillén Cuervo	(Note: Controversial film that adapted famous novel by Almudena Grandes)
U N D E T E R M I N E D		The Cross of Iberia (La cruz de Iberia)	Director: Eduardo Mencos Cast: Steve Railsback, Scott Wilson, Alejandra Grepi, Antonio Dechent	

== Box office ==
The five highest-grossing Spanish films in 1990, by domestic box office gross revenue, are as follows:

Highest-grossing films of 1990
Rank	Title	Admissions	Domestic gross (₧)
1	Aquí huele a muerto... (pues yo no he sido)	1,367,893	482,748,698
2	Tie Me Up! Tie Me Down! (¡Átame!)	1,218,988	482,698,238
3	Yo soy esa	975,432	386,112,523
4	Ay Carmela (¡Ay, Carmela!)	717,703	271,207,763
5	Disparate nacional	467,807	156,686,614

== See also ==
- 5th Goya Awards
- 1990 in film
