= Elisabeth Mulder =

Spanish writer (1904–1987)

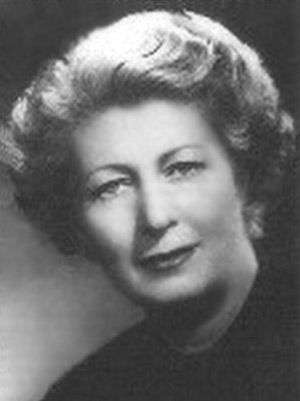
- Born: Elisabeth Mulder Pierluisi
- Spouse: Ezequiel Dauner Foix (1921–1930)
- Children: 1
- Writing career
- Language: Spanish

Elisabeth Mulder Pierluisi (married name, Elizabeth Mulder de Dauner; 9 February 1904 – 28 November 1987) was a Spanish writer, poet, translator, journalist and literary critic.

== Early life ==
Elisabeth Mulder Pierluisi was born on 9 February 1904 in Barcelona. She was the daughter of Enrique Mulder García, (Marquis of Tedema Toelosdorp of the Netherlands) a doctor and son of Dutch Spanish parents, and Zoraida Pierluisi Grau, a Puerto Rican of Italian and Catalan descent. She inherited the title of Marquise of Tedema Toelosdorp from her father, although she never used the title.

She spent part of her childhood in her mother's native Puerto Rico before moving to Barcelona at the age of seven, where she would live for most of her life. She lived a cosmopolitan life and travelled around Europe, learning four languages in addition to her native Spanish and English. She was fluent in German, French, Italian and Russian, which later enabled her to translate Pushkin directly. Influenced by her mother, she received a musical education and studied piano with Enrique Granados at the school he ran in Barcelona.

== Career ==
In 1919 Mulder won a poetry competition with her poem "Circe" and around this time she also began her journalistic collaboration with El Noticiero Universal in Barcelona, where she took charge of the section on English literature, where she specialised in critiqueing Victorian novels.

She published her first collection of poems Embrujamiento in 1927 and her first novel, Una sombra entre los dos in 1934 followed by La historia de Java (1935), a delicately lyrical account of the story of a cat, independent and wandering, called Java because "she walked with the thrilling elegance, at once decadent and ritual, of a Batavian dancer". This work received positive reviews from Manuel Azaña and Juan José Domenchina. She also developed children's literature and theatre (Casa Fontana and Romance de media noche) in collaboration with María Luz Morales. Before the Spanish Civil War she published in newspapers Mundo Gráfico and El Hogar y la Moda in Madrid; Las Provincias in Valencia, and La Noche in Barcelona. She also worked as a translator, mainly poetry, although her translations of Pearl S. Buck's The Good Earth, and Baudelaire and Pushkin poems date from this period. This was followed by a period of collaboration with short stories in the press in Brisas y Lecturas (1930 to 1935) with some thirty stories. During the war she suffers a serious case of nephritis that kept her in bed for a year, during which she wrotes Prelude to Death, a novel that was eventually published in 1941 and which had issues with the censors due to the suicide of the main character. It was adapted for cinema under the title Verónica.

Between the 1940s and 1960s she was a member of Eugenio d'Ors's cultural circle at the Academia del Faro de San Cristóbal and the Trascacho gathering. She contributed to the magazines Ínsula and Vértice and continued to translated from several languages; including versions of Baudelaire, John Keats and P. B. Shelley. In 1944 she published one of her most famous works El hombre que acabó en las islas, which largely recounts the process of learning and maturity of a young man in Spain, the Nordic countries and finally Puerto Rico, where she recreates the atmosphere of her own childhood. In 1945 she published a new collection of short stories entitled Este mundo. In 1947 she published Alba Grey, a defining work. In 1953 she published El vendedor de vidas. In 1954 she wrote Flora, another short novel, and Luna de las máscaras was published in 1958. In it she used a perspective technique, telling a story in which each fragment belongs to the point of view of a different character.

Mulder also wrote two children's fiction books, Los cuentos del viejo reloj (1941), and Las noches del gato verde (1963). In 1976 she translated the children's book La lente mágica (The Magic Lens) by Swedish photographer and children's writer Astrid Bergman Sucksdorff.Mulder continued to alternate mix writing fiction with journalism, contributing to La Vanguardia Española, Destino and Solidaridad Nacional of Barcelona, ABC of Madrid and Índice Literario of Caracas, among others, and in 1954-1955 she was in charge of the "Letras inglesas" section of Ínsula of Madrid.

In the 1960s and 1970s she worked as a lecturer at Spanish and foreign institutions and universities, including those in Boston and Puerto Rico. In the 1980s she gradually lost her sight, but succeeded in finishing a novel, El retablo de Salomé Amat, which she claimed she had been working on for more than twenty years. The novel tells the story of a family through four generations of women in the same family.

In her poetry she moved from symbolism to the classical balance of noucentisme. The protagonists of her novels are usually young women who speak languages, travel abroad, have attended Swiss schools and play bridge.

The Venezuelan magazine La Lírica Hispana dedicated an issue to her in 1962.

In 2010 she was featured along with 19 other names by Pepa Merlo in the anthology Peces en la Tierra. Antología de mujeres poetas en torno a la Generación del 27, published by the Fundación José Manuel Lara in the Vandalia collection.

In 2023 Amarillo Editora published a new revised edition of her novel Alba Grey.

== Personal life ==
In 1921 Mulder married the Catalan lawyer and politician Ezequiel Dauner Foix, almost thirty years her senior, with whom she had a son, Enrique Dauner Mulder. Her husband died in 1930.

The poet, journalist, and athlete, Ana María Martínez Sagi, considered Mulder to be her great love. They had met at one of the many conferences Martínez Sagi gave throughout Spain in the early 1930s to vindicate the role of women in society. In 1931 they holidayed together in Mallorca and as a result their families separated them.

Mulder died in Barcelona in 1987.

== Selected works ==
- Embrujamiento. Barcelona: Cervantes, 1927
- La canción cristalina. Barcelona: Cervantes, 1928
- Sinfonía en rojo. Barcelona: Cervantes, 1929
- La hora emocionada. Barcelona: Cervantes, 1931
- Paisajes y meditaciones. Barcelona: Atenas, 1933
- Una sombra entre los dos. Barcelona: Ediciones Edita, 1934
- La historia de Java. Barcelona: Juventud S.A., 1935
- Romanza de media noche, 1936
- Preludio a la muerte. Madrid: Pueyo, 1941
- Una china en la casa y otras historias. Barcelona: Surco, 1941
- Los cuentos del viejo reloj. Barcelona: Juventud S.A., 1941
- Crepúsculo de una ninfa. Barcelona: Surco, 1942
- El hombre que acabó en las islas. Barcelona: Apolo, 1944
- Más. Barcelona: Selecciones literarias, 1944
- Las hogueras de otoño. Barcelona: Juventud S.A., 1945
- Este mundo. Barcelona: Artigas, 1945
- Galerstein: Apolo, 1946
- Alba Grey. Barcelona: José Janés, 1947
- Casa Fontana, 1948
- Poemas mediterráneos, 1949
- Día negro. Madrid: Editorial Rollán, 1953
- Flora. Madrid: Tecnos, 1953
- El vendedor de vidas. Barcelona: Juventud S.A., 1953
- Eran cuatro. Madrid: Tecnos, 1954
- Luna de las máscaras. Barcelona: AHR, 1958
- Pareja y borras, 1958
- Las noches del gato verde. Madrid: Anaya, 1963
- Sentados en un banco de piedra, 1984
- Sol y el niño, 1985

== See also ==
- List of Costa Brava films
