= María Luz Morales =

Spanish journalist and writer

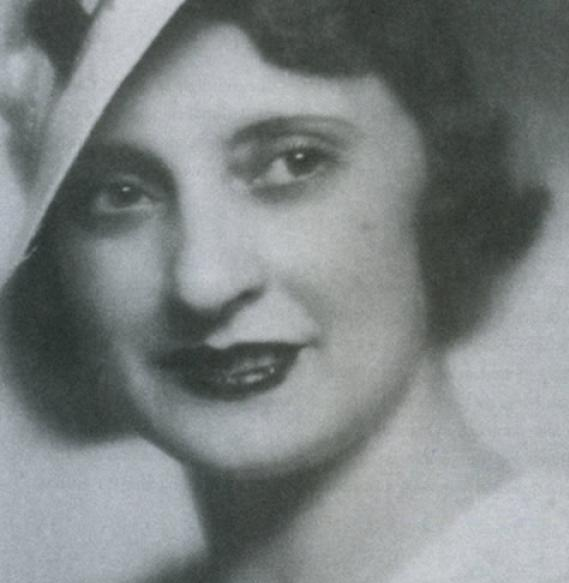
- Born: María Luz Morales Godoy; 1890; A Coruña, Galicia, Spain
- Died: 1980 (aged 89–90); Barcelona, Catalonia, Spain
- Occupation: Journalist
- Writing career
- Notable work: La Vanguardia
- Notable awards: Orden de las Palmas Académicas

María Luz Morales Godoy (1890 in La Coruña – 1980 in Barcelona) was a pioneering Spanish cultural journalist and writer of the 20th century.

She was the first woman in Spain to direct a national newspaper, La Vanguardia, which she managed during the period of 1936 and 1937 at the beginning of the Guerra Civil Española.

In 1939, she was detained for 40 days and was professionally unable to work because of Francoism. With the retorno de la democracia, she continued her work, collaborating with Diario de Barcelona until her death, at the age of 91. She was instrumental in the incorporation of women for journalistic and literary activity in España del siglo XX.

== Awards and honours ==
- 1956 - Orden de las Palmas Académicas
- 1963 - Premio Nacional de Teatro (1962)
- 1971 - Lazo de Isabel la Católica

== Selected works ==
- Parientes y trastos viejos (inédita)
- Trovas de otros tiempos, 1928
- Libros, mujeres y niños, 1928
- Las románticas, 1930
- Edison, 1934
- Romance de media noche (with Elisabeth Mulder), 1935
- Julio César, 1936
- Madame Curie, 1936
- Alejandro Magno, 1936
- Alguien a quien conocí, 1937
- Tres historias de amor en la Revolución francesa, 1942
- María Antonieta, 1943
- El mundo de las hormigas, 1948
- El Cine: historia ilustrada del séptimo arte, 1950
- Hazañas del Cid, 1951. ISBN 9785518959859, OCLC 868202579
- Enciclopedia del hogar, 1952
- Rosalinda en la ventana, 1954
- Balcón al Atlántico: (otra novela sin héroe), 1955
- Balcón al Mediterráneo, 1955
- Historias del décimo círculo, 1962
- Libro de oro de la poesía en lengua castellana, 1970

== Bibliography ==
- María Ángeles Cabré (2017). María Luz Morales. Pionera del periodismo (Libros de Vanguardia).
