= Angélica Liddell =

Spanish writer, theatre director and actor (born 1966)

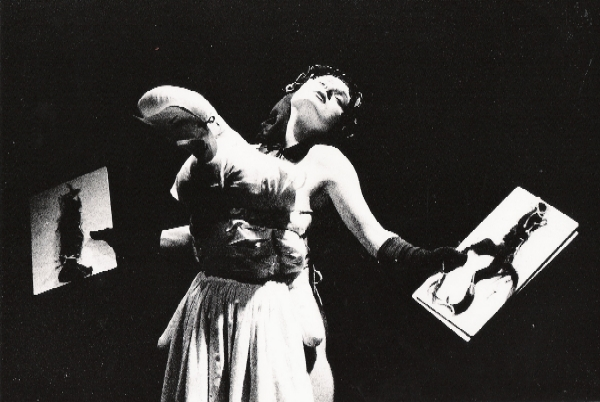
- Born: Catalina Angélica González Cano; 2 October 1966 (age 59); Figueres, Catalonia, Spain
- Occupations: Writer, theatre director and actor
- Writing career
- Genres: Theatre, poetry, prose

Angélica Liddell (born Catalina Angélica González Cano on 2 October 1966) is a Spanish writer, theatre director and actor. Liddell has received numerous accolades, including the National Dramatic Literature Award in 2012 for La casa de la fuerza and the National Theater Award in 2025, both awarded by the Spanish Ministry of Culture, the Leone d’Argento of Theatre at the Biennale di Venezia 2013, and she has been decorated as Chevalier des Arts et Lettres in 2017. Her career spans over three decades, with premieres at venues such as the Théâtre national de la Colline in Paris or the Avignon Festival.

== Biography ==
Catalina Angélica González Cano was born in Figueres, Catalonia, Spain, and went on to study psychology and dramatic arts. Liddell began writing plays during the 1980s. In 1993, she founded the theatre company Atra Bilis Teatro.

Her works have been performed in Spain, Germany, Brazil, France and Chile; her work been translated into French, English, Portuguese, German, Polish and Russian. Besides plays for theatre, she writes poetry and prose.

== Awards and honours ==
- The Casa de América Innovative Playwriting Award in 2003;
- Second prize for the Lope de Vega Award in 2007;
- The Valle-Inclán Award for Theatre in 2008;
- Nominated for the Europe Prize Theatrical Realities of the Europe Theatre Prize since 2011;
- The National Dramatic Literature Award, Spain in 2012 for La casa de la fuerza;
- The Silver Lion at the Venice Biennale in 2013.

== Selected plays ==
- La falsa suicida (2000)
- Once upon a time in West Asphixia (2002)
- Y cómo no se pudrió Blancanieves (2005)
- Perro muerto en tintorería: los Fuertes (2007)
- La casa de la fuerza (2009)
- Ping Pang Qiu (2013)
- Alice Syndrome (2013)
- ¿Qué haré yo con esta espada? (2016)
- The Scarlett Letter (2019)
- Una costilla sobre la mesa: madre (2019)
- Una costilla sobre la mesa: padre (2020)
- Terebrante (2021)
- Caridad (2022)
- Vudú (3318) Blixen (2023)
- DÄMON El funeral de Bergman (2024)
- Seppuku. El funeral de Mishima o el placer de morir (2025)
