= ¡Ay Carmela! (play) =

Play written by José Sanchis Sinisterra

¡Ay, Carmela! is a play by José Sanchis Sinisterra, set in the opening months of the Spanish Civil War, which premiered 5 November 1987 in Zaragoza under José Luis Gómez, who also played Paulino. Heavily allegorical, it tells the story of travelling players, Carmela and Paulino, who blunder into the wrong place at the wrong time. A film of the same name — ¡Ay, Carmela! — was released in 1990. The play takes its name from a popular Spanish Civil war song Ay Carmela.

Originally written in Spanish, it toured in 2006 in the UK in English.

== Scripts ==
- Ñaque, ¡Ay, Carmela! by José Sanchis Sinisterra (Spanish, paperback), Ediciones Catedra, 1991. ISBN 978-84-376-1034-4
- Ay, Carmela! by José Sanchis Sinisterra, trans. John London (English, paperback), New Theatre Publications, 2003. ISBN 978-1-84094-322-1

== US premiere, Gala Theater, Washington DC, Sep 15 - Oct 9, 2011 ==
- Gala Theater, Washington DC, Sep 15 - Oct 9, 2011
- GALA Hispanic Theatre presents ¡Ay, Carmela!
- Wide-ranging and stirring ¡Ay, Carmela! at GALA Theatre
- The life and death of a Spanish dancer
- ¡Ay, Carmela! se estrena en Washington dirigida por José Luis Arellano
- Love and war at Gala
