= Domingo Miras =

Spanish dramatist (1934–2022)

Domingo Miras Molina (5 February 1934 – 20 January 2022) was a Spanish dramatist.

He won the Lope de Vega Prize in 1975 for his play De San Pascual a San Gil and the Tirso de Molina Prize in 1980 for Las alumbradas de la Encarnación Bendita. In year 2000 he received the Spanish National Dramatic Literature Award for his plays Una familia normal and Gente que prospera.

Miras died in Campo de Criptana on 21 January 2022, at the age of 87.
