= Manuel Lourenzo =

Spanish theatre director (1943–2025)

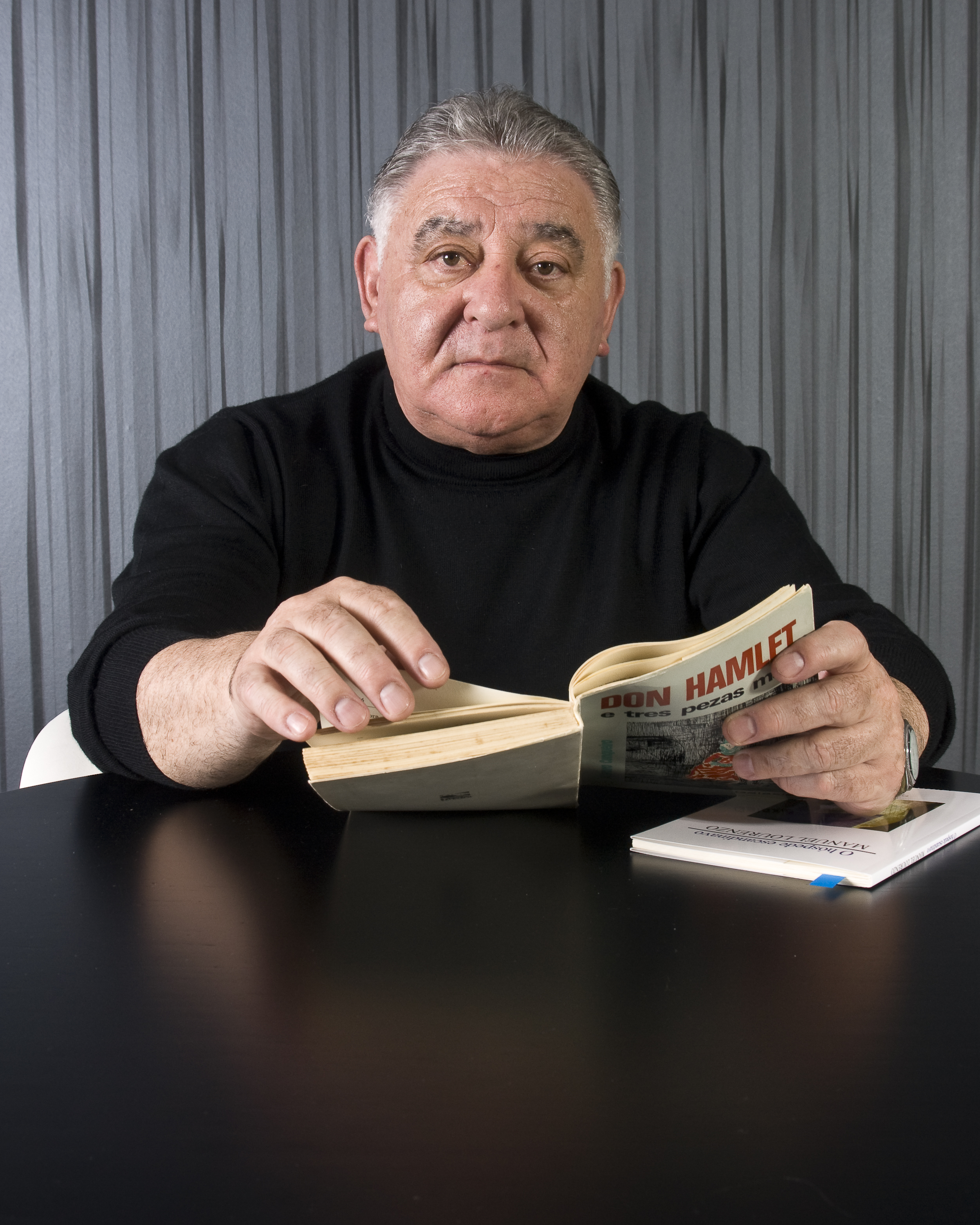
Manuel Lourenzo, 2010

Manuel María Lourenzo Pérez (15 April 1943 – 10 August 2025) was a Spanish theatre director, actor and playwright.

== Life and career ==
Lourenzo was born in Ferreira do Valadouro, Lugo, on 15 April 1943. He graduated from the Barcelona Theatre Institute, before beginning in the theatre in Galicia in the 1960s. In 1978, he co-founded the Galician Dramatic School.

He wrote around 300 dramatic works in Galician, including Romería ás covas do Demo (1975) and Veladas indecentes (1996), as well as a novel, O Moucho. He also acted on stage, as well as in films including Urxa (1989) and Mareas vivas (1998). He translated a number of classic and contemporary plays into Galician.

He was awarded the National Prize for Dramatic Literature for Veladas indecentes (1997).

Lourenzo died on 10 August 2025, in A Coruña, at the age of 82.
