= The Most Natural Thing =

- Theatrical release poster
- Spanish: Lo más natural
- Directed by: Josefina Molina
- Screenplay by: Joaquín Oristrell
- Produced by: José Samano
- Starring: Charo López; Miguel Bosé; Patrick Bauchau; Viviane Vives
- Cinematography: Jaume Peracaula
- Edited by: Carmen Frías
- Music by: José Nieto
- Production company: Sabre TV
- Distributed by: CB Films
- Release date: 24 January 1991
- Country: Spain
- Language: Spanish

The Most Natural Thing (Spanish: Lo más natural) a 1991 Spanish melodrama film directed by Josefina Molina from a screenplay by Joaquín Oristrell which stars Charo López alongside Miguel Bosé, Patrick Bauchau, and Viviane Vives.

== Plot ==
Abandoned by her husband after twenty years of marriage, Clara rethinks her existence, and after Andrés comes into her life, they begin a love story.

== Cast ==
- Charo López as Clara
- Miguel Bosé as Andrés
- Patrick Bauchau as Pablo
- Viviane Vives as Lucía
- Fernando Valverde as Iván
- Rosa Novell as Merche
- Concha Hidalgo as Pilar
- Ayanta Barilli as Bea
- Tito Augusto as Max
- Sonsoles Benedicto as Lalí

== Release ==
The film was released theatrically in Spain on 24 January 1991.

== Reception ==
Casimiro Torreiro of El País considered that despite the presence of a number of assets in the film (including the leading duo), Molina cannot overcome the film's "unpolished screenplay" with the outcome of the film unfortunately "remaining only in its good intentions".

== Accolades ==
Year	Award	Category	Nominee(s)	Result	Ref.
1991	5th Goya Awards	Best Actress	Charo López	Nominated	
1991	5th Goya Awards	Best Original Score	José Nieto	Won	
1991	5th Goya Awards	Best Art Direction	Rafael Palmero	Nominated	

== See also ==
- List of Spanish films of 1991
