= Don Juan, My Dear Ghost =

- Theatrical release poster
- Spanish: Don Juan, mi querido fantasma
- Directed by: Antonio Mercero
- Screenplay by: Antonio Mercero; Joaquín Oristrell
- Based on: Don Juan Tenorio by José Zorrilla
- Starring: Juan Luis Galiardo; María Barranco; Loles León; Verónica Forqué; Rossy de Palma; Luis Escobar; Rafael Álvarez "El Brujo"; Pedro Reyes; José Sazatornil "Saza"
- Cinematography: Carlos Suárez
- Edited by: Rosa Salgado
- Music by: Bernardo Bonezzi
- Production company: BMG Films
- Distributed by: United International Pictures
- Release date: 24 August 1990
- Country: Spain
- Language: Spanish

Don Juan, My Dear Ghost (Spanish: Don Juan, mi querido fantasma) is a 1990 Spanish fantasy comedy film directed by Antonio Mercero starring Juan Luis Galiardo in a double role as Don Juan Tenorio and an actor.

== Plot ==
On the 1990 Day of the Dead in Seville, legendary womanizer Don Juan Tenorio wakes up from the dead, coming to clash with actor Juan Marquina, who is playing him on stage in the José Zorrilla's play as the ghost supplants the actor vis-à-vis Marquina's romantic affairs.

== Cast ==
- Juan Luis Galiardo as Don Juan Tenorio / Don Juan Marquina
- María Barranco as Doña Inés
- José Sazatornil "Saza" as comisario Ulloa
- Verónica Forqué as señora de Marquina
- Luis Escobar as narcotraficante
- Rossy de Palma as viuda de Prodini
- Loles León as coreógrafa Castañuelas
- Rafael Álvarez "El Brujo" as Curro
- Pedro Reyes as Rubén
- Antonio Gamero as regidor
- José Luis Santos as Don Luis Mejías

== Production ==
The screenplay was written by Antonio Mercero in tandem with Joaquín Oristrell. The film was produced by BMG Films with the association of TVE and Productora Andaluza de Programas. Shooting locations included Seville.

== Release ==
The film was released theatrically in Spain on 24 August 1990. It was also programmed at the 1990 Montreal World Film Festival.

== Accolades ==
Year	Award	Category	Nominee(s)	Result	Ref.
1991	5th Goya Awards	Best Special Effects	Carlos Santos, Juan Ramón Molina	Nominated	

== See also ==
- List of Spanish films of 1990
