= Agustín García Calvo =

Spanish writer (1926–2012)

Agustin Garcia Calvo
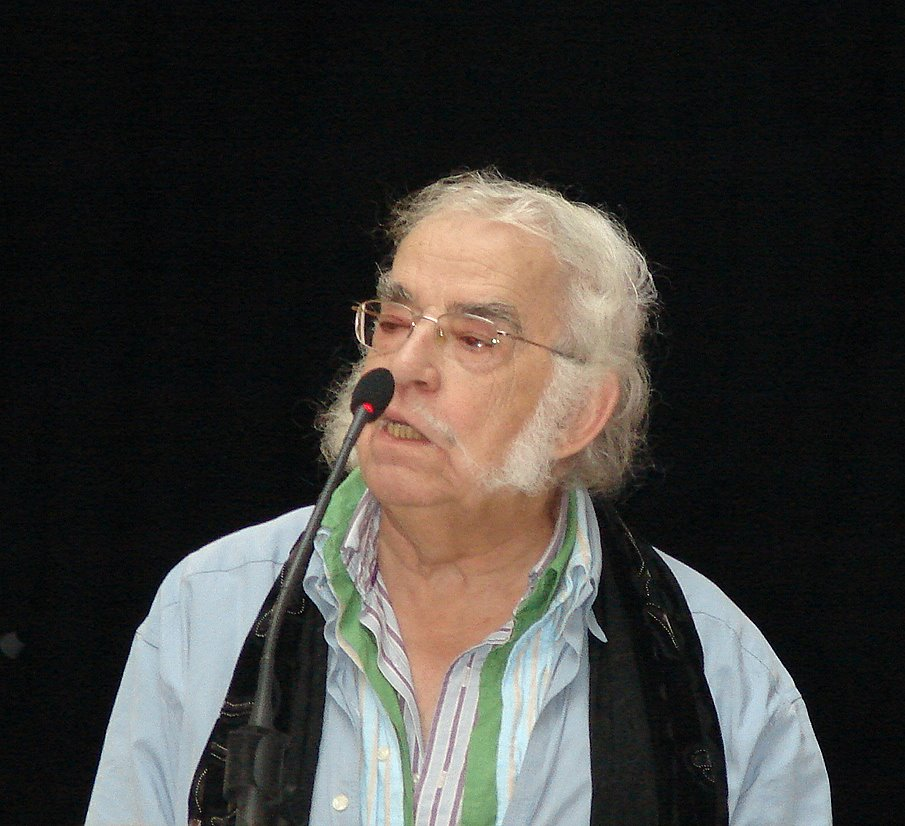
- Born: October 15, 1926; Zamora, Spain
- Died: November 1, 2012 (age 86); Zamora, Spain

Philosophical work
- Era: 20th-century philosophy
- Region: Western philosophy
- School: Continental philosophy
- Main interests: Linguistics, Philology, Logic, epistemology, ethics, ontology, psychology

Agustín García Calvo (October 15, 1926 – November 1, 2012) was a Spanish philologist, philosopher, poet, and playwright.

== Biography ==
García Calvo was born and died in Zamora. He read Classical Philology at Salamanca University, being one of the first students of Spanish philologist Antonio Tovar. He concluded his doctoral dissertation on Ancient prosody and metrics in Madrid at the age of 22. In 1951, he worked as a grammar-school teacher. In 1953 he was appointed to a university chair of Classical Languages in Seville, and he occupied a second chair at Madrid's Universidad Complutense (then called "Central University of Madrid") from 1964 to 1965. In 1965 the Franco administration expelled him from his Madrid chair, along with Enrique Tierno Galván, José Luis López Aranguren and Santiago Montero Díaz, because they had given support to student protests against the fascist government. José María Valverde and Antonio Tovar resigned from their university chairs as a sign of protest against this reprisal. García Calvo spent many years of his subsequent exile in Paris, being appointed professor at Lille University and at the Collège de France. He also worked as a translator for the exiled Spanish publishing house Ruedo Ibérico. In the French capital he organized a regular circle of political discussion in one of the cafés of the Latin Quarter. In 1976, following the death of General Franco, he recovered his chair in Madrid, where he remained teaching ancient philology until his retirement in 1992. He was emeritus professor at the Universidad Complutense until 1997 and remained active as a lecturer, writer and columnist until his death in 2012.

== Political thought ==
In his written works and public statements, García Calvo attempted to give voice to an anonymous popular sentiment that rejects the intrigues of Power. An essential part of this struggle consists in denouncing Reality - an idea that appears to be a true reflection of "what there is", while in fact it is an abstract construction in which things are reduced by force to the status of mere ideas. In this process of reduction all unpredictable and undefined aspects that may be found in things are destroyed, thus facilitating their subjection to all kinds of plots, schemes and intrigues. People - just another case of a "thing" - are in this way organized into individuals, subject to a double and contradictory requirement, which is that each of them has to be the one he is, and yet all of them have to constitute a mass of many. Fortunately this kind of social organization always leads to flaws and imperfections, and it is just these unpredictable impulses, inaccessible to planning and calculation, to which García Calvo refers when he speaks of "the people".

The ever-increasing sophistication of Power arrives at its pinnacle in democratic societies that are composed of masses of individuals. Given that the "scheme of progress" consists in imposing this democratic system in all parts of the world, popular struggle has to be directed against democracy itself, being this the kind of political régime that administers death to the people in the most advanced societies. The simultaneous survival of comparatively old-fashioned systems of domination (for example, communist dictatorships and some forms of religious rule in Arab countries) is only meant to legitimate democracy through a rhetoric of "unfavourable comparison" and must therefore be considered a "cheat".

The concepts of Power and Reality are linked to a central entity that has historically held various names, such as Man, and is currently represented as Money. Under this framework, money serves as a universal standard of cost and value to which other concepts are reduced. Science functions as the system of belief associated with this model, operating to maintain current definitions of Reality and to convey that systemic control is maintained.

In democracy, State and Capital are only two manifestations of the same underlying phenomenon. Popular struggle must be directed against both, without ever claiming a "right" to anything (as this would imply an acknowledgement of the legitimacy of Power) or proposing alternative forms of government (as this would only contribute to the further advance of Power). This popular struggle is not an individual struggle (since the individual, created after the image of the State, is essentially a reactionary entity and must be conceived as the people's most important adversary), but rather the people's struggle - a struggle that originates in what remains in us of the people, beneath all our individual features and in open contradiction with these.

Speech or language plays an important role in oppressing the people, but also in their rebellion. Those words that have signification in each of the world's languages constitute a Reality that happens to be different in each tribe. Insofar as language helps create the illusion that we know everything there is and that we know how to call it and how to manipulate it, language is a weapon directed against the people. On the other hand we continuously see conjectures or glimpses arise in the common use of language that point to the opposite conclusion (that we do not know what there is and that Reality does not reach so far as to include everything that occurs), and in this sense language, something that anyone can use although no-one can possess it, also constitutes the people's self-expression par excellence.

Specific examples of what this struggle against Reality may look like can be found (1) in García Calvo's attacks on the car (the individual vehicle) and his activism in defence of the train, (2) in the struggle against the idea that "we all together form public finance" and (3) in the decision to use the same style in writing as in oral communication, as opposed to the pedantic use of language that we know from academic scholars, civil servants and newspaper journalists.

== Awards ==
- In 1999 he was awarded the National Dramatic Literature Award for his play Baraja del rey don Pedro.
- In 2006 he was awarded the Premio Nacional a la Obra de un Traductor.

== Bibliography ==
- Librosdeagustingarciacalvo.blogspot.com

=== Grammar and language theory ===
- Pequeña introducción a la prosodia latina (Madrid : Sociedad de Estudios Clásicos, 1954)
- Lalia, ensayos de estudio lingüístico de la sociedad (Madrid: Siglo XXI, 1973)
- Del ritmo del lenguaje (Barcelona: La Gaya Ciencia, 1975)
- Del lenguaje (I) (Zamora: Lucina, 1979; 2 ªed correg. 1991).
- De la construcción (Del lenguaje II) (Zamora: Lucina, 1983).
- Del aparato (Del Lenguaje III) (Zamora: Lucina, 1999).
- Hablando de lo que habla. Estudios de lenguaje (Premio Nacional de Ensayo 1990) (Zamora: Lucina, 1989; 2ª ed. 1990; 3ª ed. 1990; 4ª ed. 1993)
- Contra la Realidad, estudios de lenguas y cosas (Zamora: Lucina, 2002).

=== Logic ===
- De los números (Barcelona: La Gaya Ciencia, 1976)

=== Editions and translations of classics ===
- Aristófanes, Los carboneros (Akharneís). Versión rítmica de A. García Calvo (Zamora: Lucina, 1981; 2ª ed. 1998).
- Don Sem Tob, Glosas de sabiduría o proverbios morales y otras rimas. (texto crítico, versión, introducción y comentario) (Madrid: Alianza Editorial, 1974).
- Herakleitos, Razón común (Lecturas presocráticas II) Edición, ordenación, traducción y comentario de los restos del libro de Heraclito (Zamora: Lucina, 1985).
- Homero, Ilíada . Versión rítmica de Agustín García Calvo (Zamora: Lucina, 1995).
- Xenophon, Memorias de Sócrates, Apología, Simposio (traducción, introducción y notas) (Madrid: Alianza Editorial; 1967, Salvat Editores, 1971).
- Lecturas presocráticas (Zamora: Lucina, 1981: 3.ª ed. con el Parmenides renovado 2001).
- Lucrecio, De Rerum Natura / De la Realidad. Edición crítica y versión rítmica de A. García Calvo (Zamora: Lucina, 1997).
- Plautus, Pséudolo o Trompicón (traducción rítmica, introducción y notas) (Madrid: Cuadernos para el Diálogo, 1971).
- Platón, Diálogos Socráticos, Apología, Teages, Los enamorados, - Cármides, Clitofonte (traducción, introducción y notas) (Barcelona: Salvat Editores, 1972).
- Poesía antigua (De Homero a Horacio) (Zamora: Lucina, 1992).
- Socrates (en Enciclopedia Universitas, t. II, fasc.30), (Barcelona: Salvat Editores, 1972).
- Sophocles, Edipo Rey. Versión rítmica de A. García Calvo (Zamora: Lucina, 1982; 2ª ed. 1988; 3ªed. 1993).
- Virgilio (estudio biográfico y versión rítmica de las Bucólicas del libro IV de las Geórgicas y del libro VI de la Eneida) (Madrid: Ediciones Júcar, 1976).

=== Other translations ===
- Shakespeare, William, Sonetos de amor ( texto crítico, traducción en verso, introducción y notas) (Barcelona: Anagrama, 1974)
- Shakespeare, William, Sueño de noche de verano (1980: 2.ª ed. 1988: 3.ªed- 1993)
- Shakespeare, William, Macbeth (1980) Versiones rítmicas de A. García Calvo. ed Lucina
- Marquis de Sade Instruir deleitando o Escuela de amor (La philosophie dans le boudoir). Traducción y prólogo de A. Garcia Calvo- (Zamora: Lucina, 1980: 2.ªed. 1988)
- Georges Brassens. 19 Canciones. Con versión para cantar de A. Garcia Calvo (1983) ed. Lucina
- Belli, Giuseppe-Gioachino, 47 sonetos romanescos con las versiones de Agustín García Calvo (Zamora: Lucina, 2006)
- Valéry, Paul, Le Cimetière Marin / El Cementerio Marino con la versión rítmica de Agustín García Calvo (Zamora: Lucina, 2006)

=== Essays, politics ===
- Contra el Tiempo (Zamora: Lucina, 1993; 2ª edición 2001)
- De Dios (Zamora: Lucina, 1996)
- Actualidades (Zamora: Lucina, 1980)
- Análisis de la Sociedad del Bienestar (Zamora: Lucina, 1993: 2ª ed. 1995)
- Cartas de negocios de José Requejo (Zamora: Lucina, 1981)
- Contra la Pareja (Zamora: Lucina, 1994: 2ª ed. 1995)
- Noticias de abajo (Zamora: Lucina, 1991 - 2.ª ed. 1991 - 3ª ed.1995)
- Locura. 17 casos (Zamora: Lucina).
- De la felicidad (Zamora: Lucina, 1986; 2.ª ed. 1989; 3ª ed- 1991, 4ª ed. 2000)
- De los modos de integración del pronunciamiento estudiantil (Zamora: Lucina, 1987)
- El amor y los 2 sexos. Del tiempo de amor y olvido (Zamora: Lucina, 1984: 2.ª ed. 1991)
- Familia: la idea y los sentimientos (Zamora: Lucina, 1983; 2ª ed. 1992)
- Historia contra tradición. Tradición contra Historia (Zamora: Lucina, 1983; 2ª ed. 1998)
- Contra el hombre (con dos epílogos de Isabel Escudero) (Madrid: Fundación de Estudios Libertarios, Anselmo Lorenzo, 1996)
- Manifiesto contra el despilfarro(Madrid: Banda de Moebius, 1977)
- ¿Qué es el Estado? (Barcelona: La Gaya Ciencia,1977)
- Apotegmas apropósito del marxismo (París: Ruedo Ibérico, 1970)
- Contra la Paz. Contra la Democracia (Barcelona: Editorial Virus, 1993)
- ¿Qué es lo que pasa? (Zamora: Lucina, 2006)

=== Poetry ===
- Al burro muerto ... (1998), ed. Lucina.
- Bebela (1987; 2ª ed 2001), ed. Lucina.
- Canciones y soliloquios (1982; 2.ª ed. 1993), ed. Lucina.
- Del tren (83 notas o canciones) (1981), ed. Lucina.
- Libro de conjuros (1979; 2ªed 1981; 3ª ed 1991; 4ª ed. 2000), ed. Lucina.
- Más canciones y soliloquios (1988), ed. Lucina.
- Ramo de romances y baladas (1991), ed. Lucina.
- Relato de amor (1980; 2.ª ed. 1982; 3ªed. 1989; 4ª ed.1993), ed. Lucina.
- Sermón de ser y no ser (1980; 2ª ed.1984; 3ª ed. 1988; 4ªed. 1995), ed. Lucina.
- Valorio 42 veces (1986), ed. Lucina.
- Uno o dos en 23 sitios y más, ed. Lucina.
- 4 canciones de amor perdido y el cínife (2006), Ediciones del 4 de Agosto.

=== Theatre ===
- Baraja del Rey Don Pedro (Premio Nacional de Literatura Dramática 1999) ( 1998; 2ªed. 1999) ed. Lucina
- Ismena. Tragicomedia musical (1980)ed. Lucina
- Rey de una hora (1984) ed. Lucina
- Tres farsas trágicas y una danza titánica. "Traspaso», «Dos amores», "Velatorio» y "Rotura», cuatro obras de teatro de una media hora de duración. (1980) ed. Lucina
- Los carboneros (Acharneis). Aristófanes

=== Other ===
- Himno de la Comunidad de Madrid (1983 BOCM)
- Eso y ella. 6 cuentos y una charla (1987; 2ª ed 1993) ed. Lucina
- ¿Qué coños? 5 cuentos y una charla. (1990; 2ª ed 1991; 3ª ed. 1991: 4ª ed. 1995) ed. Lucina

=== Articles ===
Scientific articles on philology and linguistics published in journals Emérita, Estudios Clásicos, Revista Española de Lingüística, Saber Leer, etc. Articles on politics in the journal Archipiélago, and newspapers El País, Diario 16, La Razón, etc.

=== Translated works ===
- "What is it that's happening?" Translated by Eduardo Guzmán Zapater.
- "Analysis of Welfare Society"
- 'Interview with Agustín García Calvo: "The future is a vacuum that doesn't let us live"'.
