= National Dramatic Literature Award =

Cultural prize awarded in Spain

National Dramatic Literature Award (Spain)
- Premio Nacional de Literatura Dramática
- Sponsored by: Ministry of Culture and Sport
- Country: Spain
- Reward: €30,000
- First award: 1992
- Website: Premio Nacional de Literatura Dramática

The National Dramatic Literature Award of Spain (Spanish: Premio Nacional de Litertura Dramática) is a cultural prize that is awarded annually by the Spanish Ministry of Culture.

It is one the National Prizes awarded by Spain Ministry of Culture.

It was created in the 1992 and today is awarded annually by the Dirección General del Libro y Fomento de la Lectura. It recognizes and rewards a theatrical text written by a Spanish author, in any of the official languages of Spain.

This prize rewards a theatrical text published during the year, not related to the staging or not of that text.

== Awards ==
| Year | Awardees | Play |
|---|---|---|
| 2025 | Victoria Szpunberg | L’imperatiu categòric |
| 2024 | María Velasco | Primera sangre |
| 2023 | Paula Carballeira | As alumnas |
| 2022 | Josep Maria Miró | El cos més bonic que s'haurà trobat mai en aquest lloc |
| 2021 | Pablo Remón | Doña Rosita, anotada |
| 2020 | Guillem Clua | Justícia |
| 2019 | Alberto Conejero | La geometría del trigo |
| 2018 | Yolanda García Serrano | ¡Corre! |
| 2017 | Alfredo Sanzol | La respiración |
| 2016 | Lola Blasco | Siglo mío, bestia mía |
| 2015 | Mariano Llorente and Laila Ripoll | El triángulo azul |
| 2014 | Manuel Calzada Pérez | El diccionario |
| 2013 | Juan Mayorga | La lengua en pedazos |
| 2012 | Angélica Liddell | La casa de la fuerza |
| 2011 | José Ramón Fernández Domínguez | La colmena científica o el café de Negrín |
| 2010 | Lluïsa Cunillé | Aquel aire infinito |
| 2009 | Paco Bezerra | Dentro de la tierra |
| 2008 | Miguel Romero Esteo | Pontifical |
| 2007 | Rubén Ruibal | Limpeza de sangue (o sangue fai ruído) |
| 2006 | Santiago Martín Bermúdez | Las gradas de San Felipe y empeño de la lealtad |
| 2005 | Alberto Miralles | Metempsicosis |
| 2004 | José Sanchis Sinisterra | Terror y miseria en el primer franquismo |
| 2003 | Fernando Arrabal | Carta de amor (Como un suplicio chino) |
| 2002 | Ignacio Amestoy | Cierra bien la puerta |
| 2001 | Jesús Campos García | Naufragar en internet |
| 2000 | Domingo Miras | Una familia normal y Gente que prospera |
| 1999 | Agustín García Calvo | Baraja del rey don Pedro |
| 1998 | Jerónimo López Mozo | Ahlán |
| 1997 | Manuel Lourenzo | Veladas indecentes |
| 1996 | Sergi Belbel | Morir |
| 1995 | Josep Maria Benet i Jornet | E.R. |
| 1994 | José María Rodríguez Méndez | El pájaro solitario |
| 1993 | Alfonso Sastre | Jenofa Juncal |
| 1992 | Francisco Nieva | El manuscrito encontrado en Zaragoza |
