= Letters from Alou =

1990 Spanish film by Montxo Armendáriz

- Theatrical release poster
- Spanish: Las cartas de Alou
- Directed by: Montxo Armendáriz
- Screenplay by: Montxo Armendáriz
- Produced by: Elías Querejeta
- Starring: Mulie Jarju; Eulàlia Ramon; Ahmed El-Maroufi; Akonio Dolo; Albert Vidal; Lamine Mamado; Ly Babali
- Cinematography: Alfredo F. Mayo
- Edited by: Rori Sáinz de Rozas
- Music by: Luis Mendo; Bernardo Fúster
- Production company: Elías Querejeta PC
- Release dates: September 1990 (Zinemaldia); 5 October 1990 (Spain)
- Running time: 92 minutes
- Country: Spain
- Language: Spanish

Letters from Alou (Spanish: Las cartas de Alou) is 1990 Spanish film directed and written by Montxo Armendáriz.

== Plot ==
Alou, a Senegalese man that has entered Spain illegally, can only find occasional jobs due to his situation. Thanks to the letters he sends regularly to his parents, we hear of his experiences and feelings as he laboriously tries to be integrated into Spanish society. He starts out on the coast of Almería, working in the greenhouses. Then he travels to Madrid where he first comes into contact with illegal sales. He then makes his way to Segrià, to work harvesting fruit, and, finally, to Barcelona, where he works in the clothes shop of another African immigrant. His adventure comes to an abrupt end when he is arrested by the police. But he crosses the Strait again, closing the circle that leaves a door open to hope.

== Cast ==
- Mulie Jarju as Alou
- Eulàlia Ramon as Carmen
- Ahmed El-Maroufi as Moncef
- Akonio Dolo as Mulai
- Albert Vidal as padre de Carmen ('Carmen's father')
- Mamadou Lamine as Kassim
- Ly Babali as Ibrahima

== Release ==
The film entered the 38th San Sebastián International Film Festival. It was released theatrically in Spain on 5 October 1990.

== Accolades ==
Year	Award	Category	Nominee(s)	Result	Ref.
1990	38th San Sebastián International Film Festival	Golden Shell		Won	
1990	38th San Sebastián International Film Festival	Silver Shell for Best Actor	Mulie Jarju	Won	
1991	5th Goya Awards	Best Film		Nominated	
1991	5th Goya Awards	Best Director	Montxo Armendáriz	Nominated	
1991	5th Goya Awards	Best Original Screenplay	Montxo Armendáriz	Won	
1991	5th Goya Awards	Best Cinematography	Alfredo F. Mayo	Won	
1991	5th Goya Awards	Best Editing	Rosario Sáinz de Rozas	Nominated	
1991	5th Goya Awards	Best Production Supervision	Primitivo Álvaro	Nominated	
1991	5th Goya Awards	Best Sound	Pierre Lorraine, Eduardo Fernández,	Nominated	
1991	5th Goya Awards	Best Special Effects	Juan Ramón Molina, Reyes Abades	Nominated	

== See also ==
- List of Spanish films of 1990
