= Miguel Romero Esteo =

Spanish writer and university professor

- Born: 1930; Montoro, Córdoba, Spain
- Died: 29 November 2018 (aged 88)
- Occupations: Writer, University Professor

Miguel Romero García, better known as Miguel Romero Esteo (1930 – 29 November 2018), was a Spanish writer and university professor, whose work is part of Spanish post-war theatre movement.

== Biography ==
He was born in the Spanish town of Montoro (Córdoba) in 1930, and 1939 he moved to Málaga with his family.

In his youth, Estero studied Journalism and Political Science. He also studied piano, organ, and musical composition.

He began his literary career in 1963, with poetry, a novel, and several plays which were systematically prohibited by censorship. Due to his grotescomaquias during the decades of 1960s and 1970s, Romero Esteo was considered as an eccentric due to the scandals caused by his works. Along with Antonio Martínez Ballesteros, he configured the Young generation drama of the protest theatre and critical to the political system, within the so-called New Spanish Theatre.

His second work, Pontifical, which he sent to the New Theatre Festival of Sitges in 1966, caused a heated fight in the jury among the loyals to the Francoist regime and neoliberals. This 450-page grotescomaquia would overstep all the time limits of a play with a duration of eight hours. The play's immediate prohibition by censorship helped Pontifical secretly circulate among students in duplicate copies and become a symbol of the oppressed protest theatre.

In 1967, he began working as an editor in the Madrilenian newspaper Nuevo Diario, from which, through his articles, he helped the authors and the most innovating trends of worldwide dramaturgy become known in Spain.

In 1972 he premiered Paraphernalia de la olla podrida, la misericordia y la mucha consolación, a show which was subsequently taken to Paris. In 1973, he premiered Pasodoble at the Teatro Alfil during the New Theatre Festival of Madrid. Both plays are performed throughout the national territory for several years.

In the 1980s, he combined his job as a university professor in the Faculty of Philosophy and Arts of the University of Málaga with his job as an author of theatre plays and stage director.

With the performance of El vodevil de la pálida, pálida, pálida rosa, Romero Esteo premiered for the first time in a Spanish commercial theatre –it was at the Teatro Jacinto Benavente in March 1981.

Between 1983 and 1984 he was the director of Málaga International Theatre Festival.

In 1985, he was awarded from Strasbourg the Europe Prize for his work, published in 1983, Tartessos.

On 15 July 1995 his play Pasodoble was performed in the hall Strassenbahndepot of Berlin.

On 20 October 2008, he won the Spanish National Dramatic Literature Award, awarded by the Spanish Ministry of Culture for his work Pontifical, forty-two years after sending it to that New Theatre Festival in 1966.

== Work ==
Romero Esteo cultivated the dramatic genre, but also he often approached the essay and more occasionally to poetry and novel.

The Spanish linguist and academician Fernando Lázaro Carreter said about Romero Esteo's work that he “had never seen our theatre go such a long way, neither in such an audacious and intelligent manner” and that “in some of Romero Esteo's works we can find some of the greatest summits ever of European literature”.

- El romancero de la mar y los barcos. Poemario del mar.
- Pizzicato irrisorio y gran pavana de lechuzos (Grotescomaquia), author’s edition, Madrid, Cátedra, 1978. Written in 1961.
- Pontifical (Grotescomaquia), Madrid, Asociación de Alumnos de la R.E.S.A.D. y Ditirambo Teatro-Estudio, 1971, 2 vols. Underground edition. Pontifikale (German version), Fráncfort. Suhrkamp Verlag, 1971. Written in 1966.
- Patética de los pellejos santos y el ánima piadosa (Grotescomaquia) Málaga, M.H.S, 1997. Written in 1970.
- Pasodoble (Grotescomaquia), in Primer Acto, 162, November (1973). Written in 1971.
- Paraphernalia de la olla podrida, la misericordia y la mucha consolación (Grotescomaquia) (incomplete edition) in Estreno, Cincinnati University Press, March (1975). Written in 1971.
- Fiestas gordas del vino y el tocino (Grotescomaquia) Madrid, Júcar, 1975. Written between 1972 and 1973.
- El vodevil de la pálida, pálida, pálida, pálida rosa. Madrid, Fundamentos, 1979. Written in 1975.
- Horror vacui (Grotescomaquia). Written between 1974 and 1983.
- La oropéndola (Tragicomedy). Play written in the 1980s for television.
- Tartessos (Tragedy), Pipirijaina Revista de teatro y la Diputación de Málaga, Madrid, 1983.
- Liturgia de Gárgoris, rey de reyes (Tragedia), Málaga, Centro de Ediciones de la Diputación, 1987.

== Awards and recognition ==
For his work

- Spanish National Prize for Dramatic Literature (2008)
- Andalucía Prize of Theatre (1992)
- Enrique Llovet Theatre Prize for Liturgia de Gárgoris, rey de reyes (1987)
- Council of Europe Prize, through the Venice Biennial in its 33rd International Theatre Festival, for Tartessos (1985)
- Pablo Iglesias Theatre Prize for Tartessos (1984)

Others

- Adopted son of the town of Málaga (2012)
- Adopted son of the province of Málaga (2000)
