= Mostra de València =

Film festival in Spain

Mostra de València-Cinema del Mediterrani
- Location: Valencia, Spain
- Founded: 1980
- Awards: Golden Palm

The Mostra de València-Cinema del Mediterrani is a film festival held annually in Valencia, Spain.

The first edition was held in November 1980. In 2011, Valencia Mayor Rita Barberá suspended the festival as an austerity measure "until the economy recovered". In 2013, while the festival was gone, an association created the alternative festival Mostra Viva del Mediterrani. The Mostra was brought back by the municipal corporation led by Joan Ribó in 2018. For its 36th edition (2021), the Mostra was accredited by the FIAPF as a competitive festival with specialisation in cinema from Mediterranean countries. The 39th edition ended prematurely due to the 2024 floods in the Valencia region.
