= Alberto Miralles =

Spanish dramatist (1940–2004)

- Born: Alberto Miralles Grancha; 23 September 1940; Elche, Spain
- Died: 3 March 2004 (aged 63); Madrid, Spain
- Education: Institut del Teatre
- Occupations: Playwright, theatre director, critic
- Known for: Independent theatre
- Notable work: Metempsychosis
- Awards: National Dramatic Literature Award (2005, posthumously)

Alberto Miralles Grancha (23 September 1940 – 3 March 2004) was a Spanish dramatist, the author of some 40 plays. He also was a noted theatre critic for Primer Acto.

== Biography ==
He was born in Elche, but moved to Barcelona at a young age, where he majored in Romance Philology and graduated with a degree in drama and stage direction from the Institut del Teatre of Barcelona . He was also a technical chemical engineer at the School of Chemical Experts in Barcelona.

In 1967, he created the Cathar group, including actors such as Mercedes Sampietro and Jeannine Mestre. In 1975 he moved to Madrid, forcing the dissolution of the Cathar and the beginning of a new phase in its theatrical life.

In 1979, he began to teach in the TAI School of Madrid, working with playwrights such as Adolfo Marsillach on Peter Weiss' Marat/Sade, which won the Premio Especial Ciclo del Teatro Latino, and Las arrecogías del beaterio de Santa María Egipciaca by José Martín Remember. His performing work alternated with the publication of articles and reviews theater in numerous newspapers and magazines.

He was friends with, and frequently quarreled with, Marsillach Adolfo and José Luis Alonso de Santos. He was critical of the submissive official theater sponsored by the Socialist government and general corruption.

He died in Madrid on 2 March 2004, after a year-long struggle against lung cancer.

== Works ==
Miralles was one of the essential names of independent theater in the 1960s, and one of the founders of the Spanish Association of Playwrights, of which he later became president. His theater is always critical and demystifying and current on any proposed formal innovation: all procedures used freely dramatic serving a challenging critical work that breaks with conventions and values. In that sense, Miralles is a radical author.

He has also premiered numerous adaptations of classical texts and books for children. He taught at the Institut del Teatre of Barcelona from 1966 to 1974 and Imaginary Arts Workshop in Madrid since 1979. He gave numerous workshops, lectures and conferences and wrote several books on teaching theater.

Miralles is the author of numerous scholarly articles on theater published in national newspapers and magazines of the trade. He published the novels Una semana pintada de negro, which won the Maritime University Prize, and Mi país es tu piel.

He wrote about 40 plays and 7 trials and directed about 30. For all these works received over 30 awards.

=== Awards ===
- Spanish Royal Academy award, for CataroColón
- Eduart Escalante award forLa felicitat de la pedra
- Valladolid Short Theatre Award for Céfiro agreste de olímpicos embates
- Prize of the General Society of Authors (SGAE) Theatre for Los amantes del demonio, about the ETA
- National University Prize, the National Award for Screenwriting for TVE Pisando huellas (1963),
- National Sitges Prize of 1974 for Crucifernario de la culpable indecisión
- Nobel House of Spain in Paris (1983) by El trino del diablo (Short Version)
- Rojas Zorrilla Award (1984) for El jardín de nuestra infancia
- National Theatre Award of Alcorcón City (1984) for La fiesta de los locos
- National Award Brief Theatre San Javier, 1987 by Van para polvo enamorado.
- Days III Prize Short de Teatro Puerto Real with La redada (1989)
- Guipúzcoa Prize for Versos de arte menor por un varón ilustre o CataroColón (1968)
- University of Torrejón de Ardoz Prize (1993) for ¡Quedan detenidos!
- Rafael Villar Award at the XVI Olympiad 1993 for Humor for Adórame, Trialú
- The International Award "Margarita Xirgu" of 1997 by the El volcán de la pena escupe llanto
- Peñíscola City Award 1997 for Medusa
- the Ateneo de Córdoba Prize 1997 for El crimen perfecto
- José González Torices Prize 1999 for La familia de Begoña Echevarría Usandizaga
- Barahona de Soto Award 2002 for short drama for AM etc.
- National Dramatic Literature Award, posthumously in 2005 for his work Metempsychosis.
