= Francisco Vidal (actor) =

Spanish actor (1941–2023)

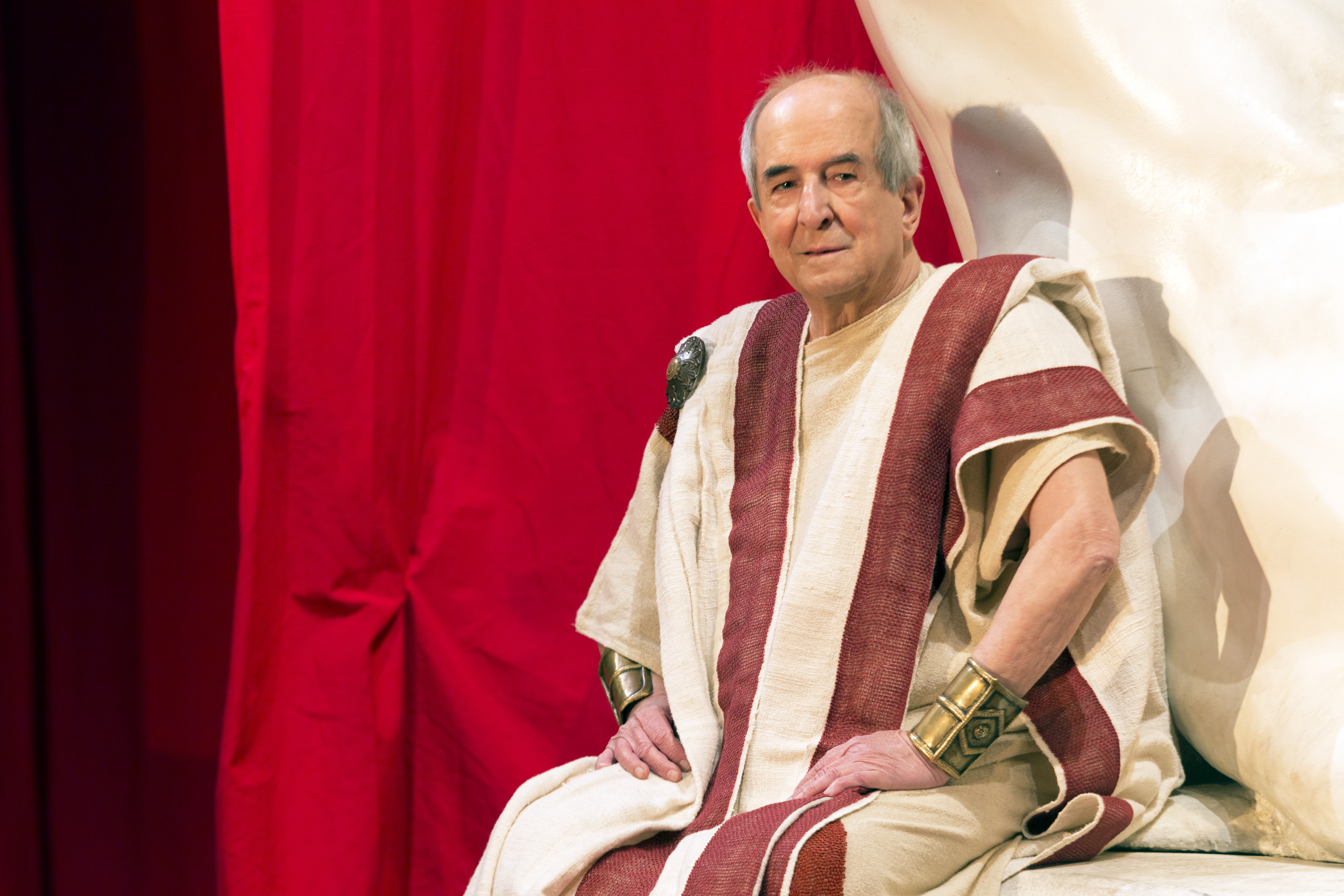
- Born: José Francisco Vidal Bornay; 1941; Ibi, Spain
- Died: 6 October 2023 (aged 82); Madrid, Spain
- Occupation: Actor

José Francisco Vidal Bornay (1941 – 6 October 2023) was a Spanish actor.

== Biography ==
Vidal was born in Ibi in 1941 and grew up in Ceuta. During his youth he moved to Madrid to study political sciences at the University of Madrid. It was here, out of curiosity, he attended the Círculo Medina, where the actor and director Miguel Narros gave acting classes. There, Vidal discovered his theatrical vocation, which was one of his great passions. The Círculo Medina led, at the beginning of the sixties, to the Teatro Estudio in Madrid, where William Layton introduced the Stanislavski method to Spain, together with Miguel Narros himself. The project was transformed in 1968 into the Independent Experimental Theater - TEI, which would last until 1978. Vidal was involved in this project, teaching acting classes. He was a professor of Teachers at the Institute of the Community Education Department from Madrid (since 1998).

Vidal died on 6 October 2023, at the HM Madrid Hospital, where he had been admitted for several days due to respiratory failure. His body was cremated in the Colmenar Viejo cemetery. He was a lifelong bachelor and his only sister had died in Alicante some time ago. A friend of the actor took care of the procedures after his death.

== Career ==
Vidal rose to fame through the series Crónicas de un pueblo (TVE, 1971–1974). Although filmed in the Madrid municipality of Santorcaz, it narrated the daily life of a Leonese town. It was the first series directed by Antonio Mercero, and in it, Vidal played the role of the priest Marcelino. He appeared in more than fifty television series and miniseries. Among others, he performed the roles such as Don Julián in the first season of El secreto de Puente Viejo on Antena 3, Doctor Freire in the series La Señora on TVE (2008-2010). He also portrayed Various characters in Hospital Central, Cuenta atrás, Hermanos y detectives, 7 vidas, El comisario, Cuéntame cómo pasó, ¡Ay, Señor, Señor! and Verano azul. In cinema, Paco Vidal worked with several directors: Vicente Aranda, José Luis Garci, Guillermo del Toro or Fernando Fernán Gómez, in various films such as The Enchanted Forest, El Crack or Pan's Labyrinth. On stage, he starred in the play La obsession, with which he won the National Theater Award.
