= José Luis Alonso de Santos =

Spanish dramatist (born 1942)

José Luis Alonso de Santos (born 23 August 1942) is a Spanish dramatist.

Santos was born in Valladolid. His play Bajarse al moro won Spain's 1985 National Theater Prize.

== Works ==
=== Performed plays ===
- ¡Viva el Duque, nuestro dueño! (1975).
- Del laberinto al 30 (1979).
- La verdadera y singular historia de la princesa y el dragón (1980).
- El álbum familiar (1982).
- Golfus Emerita Augusta (1982).
- El Gran Pudini (1983).
- Besos para la Bella Durmiente (1984).
- La estanquera de Vallecas (1985).
- Bajarse al moro (1985).
- La última pirueta (1986).
- Fuera de quicio (1987).
- Pares y nines (1989).
- El combate de Don Carnal y Doña Cuaresma (1989).
- Trampa para pájaros (1990).
- Vis a vis en Hawái (1992).
- Dígaselo con Valium (1993).
- La sombra del Tenorio (1994).
- Hora de visita (1994).
- Yonquis y yanquis (1996).
- Salvajes (1998).
- En el oscuro corazón del Bosque (2009).

=== Published plays ===
- ¡Viva el Duque, nuestro dueño! (1975).
- El combate de Don Carnal y Doña Cuaresma (1980).
- La verdadera y singular historia de la princesa y el dragón (1981).
- El álbum familiar (1982).
- La última pirueta (1987).
- La estanquera de Vallecas (1982).
- Del laberinto al 30 (1985).
- Bajarse al moro (1985).
- Fuera de quicio (1985).
- Pares y nines (1990).
- Trampa para pájaros^{[usurped]} (1991).
- Besos para la Bella Durmiente (1994).
- Vis a vis en Hawái (1994).
- La sombra del Tenorio (1995).
- Hora de visita (1996).
- Yonquis y yanquis (1997).
- El gobierno nos espía (1997).
- Matar un gato a patadas (2001).
- Cuadros racistas y humor, al fresco en mi pared (2001).
- Mis versiones de Plauto: Anfitrión, Casina y Miles masturbaciones (2002).
- Como violé a Doña Bárabara (2004).
- El romance de Carla y Luisa (2005).

=== Narrative works ===
- Paisaje desde mi bañera (1992).
- ¡Una de piratas! (2003). Children's book.
- El romano (2003).

=== Essays ===
- Teatro español de los 80 (1985). With Fermín Cabal.
- La escritura dramática (1998). Treatise on dramatic writing techniques.

== See also ==
- Alberto Miralles
