= Francisco Nieva =

Spanish playwright (1924–2016)

The Most Excellent Francisco Nieva
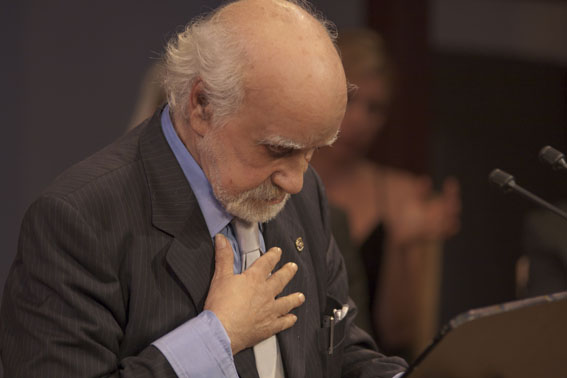
- Born: Francisco Morales Nieva; 29 December 1924; Valdepeñas (Ciudad Real), Spain
- Died: 10 November 2016 (aged 91); Madrid, Spain
- Occupation: Playwright
- Writing career
- Notable awards: Prince of Asturias Award for Literature; 1992

Seat J of the Real Academia Española
- In office 29 April 1990 – 10 November 2016
- Preceded by: Antonio Tovar
- Succeeded by: Carlos García Gual

Francisco Morales Nieva (29 December 1924 – 10 November 2016) was a Spanish playwright.

Born in Valdepeñas, he moved to Madrid at an early age to train at the San Fernando Royal Academy of Fine Arts. He was a member of the avant-garde literary movement called Postismo. Between 1948 and 1963, he lived in Paris where his acquaintances included modernists such as Ionesco and Beckett. His first published work Es bueno no tener cabeza appeared in 1971. A past winner of the Asturias Award, he was considered to be a leading candidate for the Cervantes Prize.

Nieva was elected to Seat J of the Real Academia Española on 17 April 1986, he took up his seat on 29 April 1990.

== Awards ==
- National Theatre Award (1980)
- Asturias Award for Literature (1992)
- National Dramatic Literature Award (1992)
- Gold Medal for Merit in Fine Arts (1996)
- Madrid Region Culture Award (2007)
- Corral de Comedias Award at the Almagro Festival (2010)

== Works ==
- Es bueno no tener cabeza (1971)
- El maravilloso catarro de lord Bashaville (1971)
- Tórtolas, crepúsculo y... telón (1972)
- La carroza de plomo candente (1972)
- El combate de Ópalos y Tasia (1972)
- Pelo de tormenta (1972)
- El fandango asombroso (1973)
- Coronada y el toro (1974)
- El paño de injurias (1975)
- El rayo colgado (1975)
- El baile de los ardientes (1975)
- Nosferatu (1975)
- Sombra y quimera de Larra (1976)
- La Paz (1977)
- Delirio del amor hostil (1978)
- Los baños de Argel (1979)
- El corazón acelerado (1979)
- Malditas sean Coronada y sus hijas (1980)
- La señora Tártara (1980)
- Las aventuras de Tirante el Blanco (1987)
- Te quiero, zorra (1987)
- Corazón de arpía (1987)
- No es verdad (1987)
- Salvador Rosa (1988)
- Los españoles bajo tierra (1988)
- La Magosta (1990)
- Catalina del demonio (1991)
- Carlota Basilfinder (1991)
- Manuscrito encontrado en Zaragoza (1991)
- Los viajes forman a la juventud (1992)
- Caperucita y el otro (1995)
- Centón de teatro (1996, 2002)
- ¡Viva el estupor! (2005)
- Misterio y festival: pequeña tetralogía satírica (2005)
- El cíclope (2009)
