= 5th Goya Awards =

- Date: 16 February 1991
- Site: Palacio de Congresos de Madrid
- Hosted by: Lydia Bosch and Jorge Sanz

Highlights
- Best Film: ¡Ay, Carmela!
- Best Actor: Andrés Pajares ¡Ay, Carmela!
- Best Actress: Carmen Maura ¡Ay, Carmela!
- Most awards: ¡Ay, Carmela! (13)
- Most nominations: ¡Ay, Carmela! and Tie Me Up! Tie Me Down! (15)

Television coverage
- Network: Antena 3

The 5th Goya Awards ceremony, presented by the Academy of Cinematographic Arts and Sciences of Spain, took place in Madrid on 16 February 1991. The gala was hosted by Lydia Bosch and Jorge Sanz.

¡Ay, Carmela! swept the awards, winning in 13 out of 15 categories it was nominated for, including Best Film. The broascast was initially entrusted to Televisión Española (TVE) but after the intended host Lydia Bosch signed for Antena 3, TVE asked to replace Bosch some days before the event. After the Academy's refusal to replace Bosch for another host, the Academy reached an agreement with Antena 3 to air the ceremony instead.

== Winners and nominees ==
The winners and nominees are listed as follows:

Best Film: ¡Ay, Carmela!; Letters from Alou; Tie Me Up! Tie Me Down!	Best Director: Carlos Saura – ¡Ay, Carmela!; Pedro Almodóvar – Tie Me Up! Tie Me Down!; Montxo Armendáriz – Letters from Alou
Best Actor: Andrés Pajares – ¡Ay, Carmela!; Imanol Arias – Alone Together; Antonio Banderas – Tie Me Up! Tie Me Down!	Best Actress: Carmen Maura – ¡Ay, Carmela!; Victoria Abril – Tie Me Up! Tie Me Down!; Charo López – The Most Natural Thing
Best Supporting Actor: Gabino Diego – ¡Ay, Carmela!; Juan Echanove – Alone Together; Francisco Rabal – Tie Me Up! Tie Me Down!	Best Supporting Actress: María Barranco – The Ages of Lulu; Rosario Flores – Against the Wind; Loles León – Tie Me Up! Tie Me Down!
Best Original Screenplay: Montxo Armendáriz – Letters from Alou; Eduardo Calvo, Agustín Díaz, Manolo Matji – Alone Together; Pedro Almodóvar – Tie Me Up! Tie Me Down!	Best Adapted Screenplay: Rafael Azcona, Carlos Saura – ¡Ay, Carmela!; Almudena Grandes, Bigas Luna – The Ages of Lulu; Luis Alcoriza – La sombra del ciprés es alargada
Best New Director: Rosa Vergés – Boom Boom; José María Carreño – Black Sheep; Paco Periñán – Against the Wind	Best Spanish Language Foreign Film: Fallen from Heaven • Peru; Candy or Mint • Chile; María Antonia • Cuba
Best Cinematography: Alfredo F. Mayo – Letters from Alou; José Luis Alcaine – ¡Ay, Carmela!; José Luis Alcaine – Tie Me Up! Tie Me Down!	Best Editing: Pablo González del Amo – ¡Ay, Carmela!; Rosario Sáinz de Rozas – Letters from Alou; José Salcedo – Tie Me Up! Tie Me Down!
Best Art Direction: Rafael Palmero – ¡Ay, Carmela!; Rafael Palmero – The Most Natural Thing; Ferrán Sánchez – Tie Me Up! Tie Me Down!	Best Production Supervision: Víctor Albarrán – ¡Ay, Carmela!; Primitivo Álvaro – Letters from Alou; Esther García – Tie Me Up! Tie Me Down!
Best Sound: Gilles Ortion, Alfonso Pino – ¡Ay, Carmela!; Eduardo Fernández, Pierre Lorrain – Letters from Alou; Daniel Goldstein, Ricardo Steinberg – Tie Me Up! Tie Me Down!	Best Special Effects: Reyes Abades – ¡Ay, Carmela!; Juan Ramón Molina, Carlos Santos – Don Juan, My Dear Ghost; Reyes Abades, Juan Ramón Molina – Letters from Alou
Best Costume Design: Rafael Palmero, Mercedes Sánchez – ¡Ay, Carmela!; José María García, Lina Montero, María Luisa Zabala – I'm the One; José María Cossío – Tie Me Up! Tie Me Down!	Best Makeup and Hairstyles: Paquita Núñez, José Antonio Sánchez – ¡Ay, Carmela!; Juan Pedro Hernández, Leonardo Straface – I'm the One; Juan Pedro Hernández, Jesús Moncusi – Tie Me Up! Tie Me Down!
Best Original Score: José Nieto – The Most Natural Thing; Alejandro Massó – ¡Ay, Carmela!; Ennio Morricone–Tie Me Up! Tie Me Down!	Best Short Film: El viaje del agua; White or Black; Indefenso

== Honorary Goya ==
- Enrique Alarcón
