= José Sanchis Sinisterra =

Spanish playwright and theatre director (born 1940)

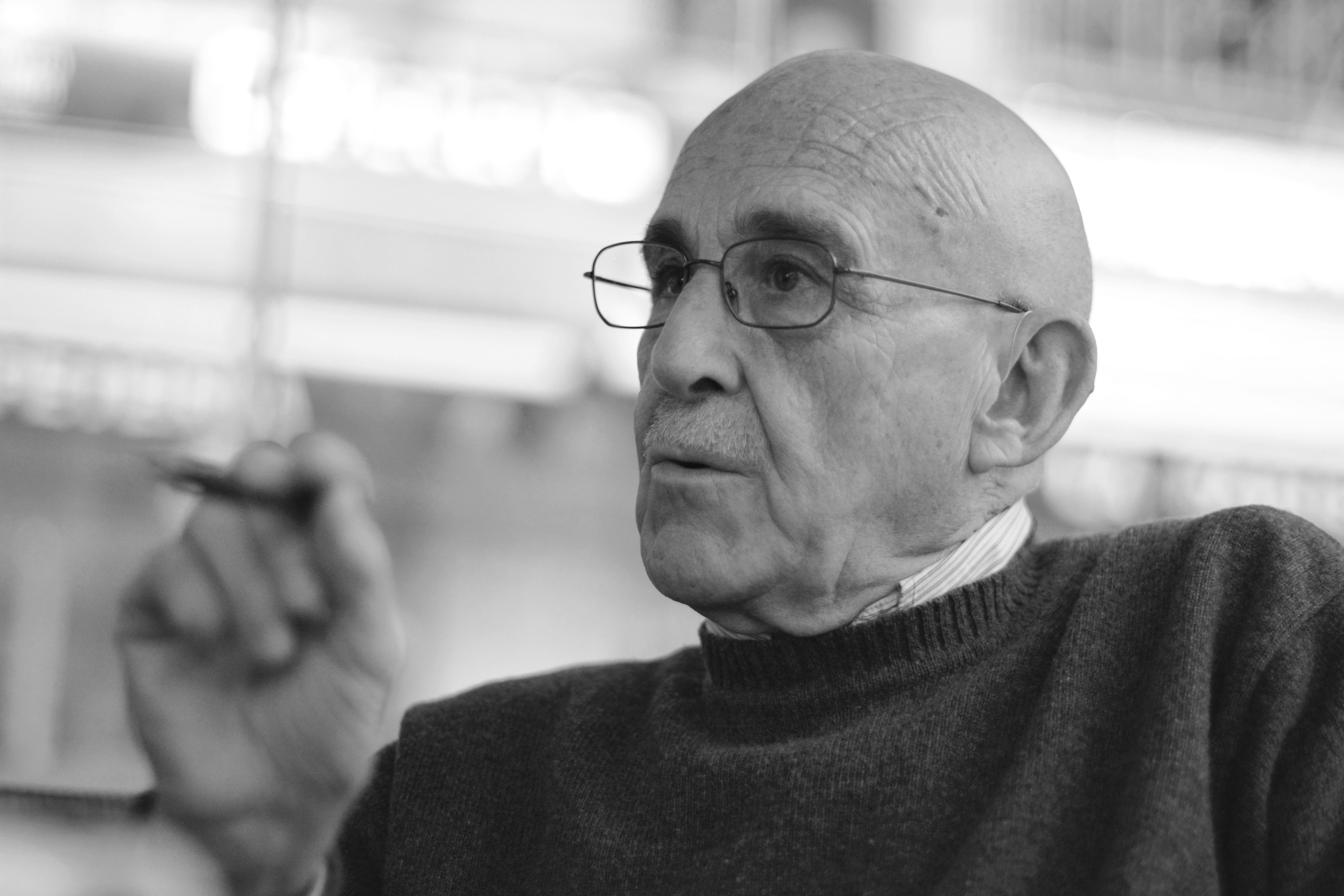
José Sanchis Sinisterra

José Sanchis Sinisterra (born June 28, 1940) is a Spanish playwright and theatre director. He was born in Valencia. He is best known, outside of Spain, for his award-winning play, ¡Ay Carmela!.

In 2004 he won the Spanish National Dramatic Literature Award for his play Terror y miseria en el primer franquismo.

== Publications ==
- Ñaque; Ay, Carmela! by José Sanchis Sinisterra (Spanish, paperback), Ediciones Catedra, 1991. ISBN 978-84-376-1034-4
- ¡Ay, Carmela! (trans. John London) (English, paperback), New Theatre Publications, 2003. ISBN 978-1-84094-322-1
- Lope de Aguirre, traidor, e-book, Caos Editorial
- El lector por horas, e-book, Caos Editorial
- Reader by the Hour, e-book, Caos Editorial
