= Premios Max =

Los Premios Max de las Artes Escénicas
- Current: 19th Max Awards
- The Premios Max logo and stylised trophy
- Awarded for: To the best of the Performing Arts of Spain
- Country: Spain
- Presented by: Sociedad General de Autores y Editores
- First award: May 25, 1998; 28 years ago
- Website: www.premiosmax.com

The Max Awards for the Performing Arts (Los Premios Max de las Artes Escénicas, Spanish pronunciation: [los ˈpɾemjos maɣs ðe las ˈaɾtes esˈθenikas]), commonly known as the Premios Max, are presented annually to honour professionals and organisations in Spain for their contributions to the performing arts. The awards are named after Max Estrella, the protagonist of Bohemian Lights, which is considered to be one of the most outstanding works of Spanish theatre of the twentieth century. The awards are organised by the General Society of Authors and Publishers, which created the awards in 1998, alongside the Spanish Academy of the Performing Arts.

The awards ceremony has a different theme and generally takes place in a different location each year, and the hosting city is considered to be Spain's capital of the performing arts for that year. The ceremony is performed and directed by prestigious actors and directors at a national level, and features theatre, dance, and musical performances throughout the show, which is broadcast on radio and television by Spanish national broadcaster RTVE.

The Max Awards are considered to be the most important performing arts award in Spain, comparable to the Laurence Olivier Award in the United Kingdom, the Tony Award in the United States or the Molière Award in France. Their equivalent film awards are the Goya Awards.

== History ==
The Max Awards are an initiative of the General Society of Authors and Publishers (SGAE), following the model of the Molières, Oliviers, and Tonys. Winners are chosen by their peers in two rounds using a secret ballot, and are presented with a trophy designed by Joan Brossa depicting an apple wearing a mask.

The award ceremony is usually held in the spring to coincide with the middle of the season, and has taken place since 1998 at various locations, including Madrid, Barcelona, Seville, Bilbao, Valencia, Vigo, Zaragoza, Guadalajara, Gran Canaria and Córdoba.

== Award categories ==
- Best Musical Theatre Production (Mejor Espectáculo de Teatro Musical)
- Best Dance Production (Mejor Espectáculo de Danza)
- Best Children's Production (Mejor Espectáculo Infantil)
- Best New Production (Mejor Espectáculo revelación)
- Best Theatrical Author (Mejor Autoría teatral)
- Best New Author (Mejor Autoría revelación)
- Best Adaption of a Theatrical Work (Mejor Adaptación de Obra Teatral)
- Best Musical Composition for Stage Performance (Mejor Composición Musical para Espectáculo Escénico)
- Best Choreography (Mejor Coreografía)
- Best Stage Direction (Mejor Dirección de Escena)
- Best Stage Design (Mejor Escenografía)
- Best Costume Designer (Mejor Figurinista)
- Best Lighting Design (Mejor Diseño de Iluminación)
- Best Actress (Mejor Actriz)
- Best Actor (Mejor Actor)
- Best Female Dance Interpreter (Mejor Intérprete Femenina de Danza)
- Best Male Dance Interpreter (Mejor Intérprete Masculino de Danza)
- Best Private Performing Arts Company or Production (Mejor Empresa o producción privada de artes escénicas)
- Honorary Award (Premio de Honor)
- Amateur Max Award (Premio Max Aficionado)
- Award for Contributions to the Performing Arts (Premio a la Contribución a las Artes Escénicas)
- Best Theatrical Author in Catalan or Valencian (Mejor autoría teatral en catalán o valenciano)
- Best Theatrical Author in Basque (Mejor autoría teatral en euskera)
- Best Theatrical Author in Galician (Mejor autoría teatral en gallego)
- Ibero-American award for the Performing Arts (Premio Iberoamericano de las Artes Escénicas)
- New Trends Award (Premio Nuevas Tendencias)
- Critics' Award (Premio de la Crítica)
