= 15th Actors and Actresses Union Awards =

2006 Spanish award ceremony

- Date: 29 May 2006
- Site: Palacio de Congresos, Madrid, Spain
- Organized by: Actors and Actresses Union

Highlights
- Honorary career award: Asunción Sancho López

The 15th Actors and Actresses Union Awards ceremony was held on 29 May 2006 at Madrid's Palacio de Congresos. The gala was directed by Juan Margallo.

In addition to the competitive awards, Asunción Sancho López obtained the 'Toda una vida' life achievement career award, whilst the Special Award went to Círculo de Bellas Artes. The platform Ahotsak won the 'Mujeres en Unión' award.

== Winners and nominees ==
The winners and nominees are listed as follows:

=== Film ===
Best Male Performance in a Leading Role: Manuel Alexandre — Elsa & Fred; Javier Cámara — Hard Times; Óscar Jaenada — Camarón: When Flamenco Became Legend	Best Female Performance in a Leading Role: Candela Peña — Princesses; Adriana Ozores — Heroine; Nathalie Poza — Hard Times
Best Male Performance in a Secondary Role: Eduard Fernández — The Method; Carmelo Gómez — The Method; Enrique Villén — Ninette	Best Female Performance in a Secondary Role: Elvira Mínguez — Tapas; Marta Etura — Something to Remember Me By; Pilar López de Ayala — Obaba
Best Male Performance in a Minor Role: Luis Callejo — Princesses; Javier Cámara — The Secret Life of Words; Fernando Guillén — Other Days Will Come	Best Female Performance in a Minor Role: Adriana Ozores — The Method; Mariana Cordero — Princesses; Violeta Pérez — Princesses

=== Television ===
Best Male Performance in a Leading Role: Paco León — Aída; Imanol Arias — Cuéntame cómo pasó; José Luis Gil — Aquí no hay quien viva	Best Female Performance in a Leading Role: Carmen Machi — Aída; Belén Rueda — Los Serrano; Rosa María Sardá — Abuela de verano
Best Male Performance in a Secondary Role: Pepe Viyuela — Aída; Pedro Casablanc — Motivos personales; Héctor Colomé — Amar en tiempos revueltos	Best Female Performance in a Secondary Role: Isabel Ordaz — Aquí no hay quien viva; Pilar Barrera — Amar en tiempos revueltos; María Pujalte — Siete vidas
Best Male Performance in a Minor Role: Daniel Albaladejo — Camera Café; Joaquín Climent — El comisario; Diego París — Maneras de sobrevivir	Best Female Performance in a Minor Role: Esperanza Pedreño — Camera Café; Rocío García-Cano — Agitación + IVA; Alexandra Jiménez — Los Serrano

=== Theatre ===
Best Male Performance in a Leading Role: Daniel Freire — Bent; Javier Godino — Hoy no me puedo levantar; Nacho Guerreros — Bent	Best Female Performance in a Leading Role: Kiti Manver — The Retreat from Moscow; Silvia Abascal — Historia de una vida; Luisa Martín — Historia de una vida
Best Male Performance in a Secondary Role: Luis Callejo — Bent; Juan Codina — Cara de plata; Antonio Vico — La curva de la felicidad	Best Female Performance in a Secondary Role: Susi Sánchez — Cara de plata; María Álvarez — Punishment without Revenge; Eva Higueras — La soga
Best Male Performance in a Minor Role: Alex Amaral — Roberto Zucco; José Luis Santar — The Odd Couple; Álex Tormo — The Seagull	Best Female Performance in a Minor Role: Maite Brik — Cara de plata; Savitri Ceballos — Punishment without Revenge; Lola Velacoracho — The Odd Couple

=== Newcomers ===
Best New Actor: Pablo Echarri — The Method; Jesús Carroza — 7 Virgins; Álex González — Round Two	Best New Actress: Micaela Nevárez — Princesses; Isabel Ampudia — 15 Days With You; Ruth Díaz — El Calentito
