= List of Spanish films of 2005 =

A list of Spanish-produced and co-produced feature films released in Spain in 2005. The theatrical release date is favoured.

== Films ==
Release		Title (Native title)	Cast & Crew	Ref.
J A N U A R Y	14	Ae Fond Kiss... (Solo un beso)	Director: Ken Loach Cast: Atta Yakub, Eva Birthistle, Riaz Ahmed, Shamshad Akhatar, Shabana Bhakish	(Note: Co-production Spain–Germany–Italy–United Kingdom (10%–20%–10%–60%).)
F E B R U A R Y	11	León and Olvido	Director: Xavier Bermúdez Cast: Marta Larralde, Guillem Jiménez, Gary Piquer	
F E B R U A R Y	18	Something to Remember Me By (Para que no me olvides)	Director: Patricia Ferreira Cast: Fernando Fernán-Gómez, Emma Vilarasau	
M A R C H	9	The Longest Penalty Shot in the World (El penalti más largo del mundo)	Director: Roberto Santiago Cast: Fernando Tejero, Marta Larralde, María Botto, Carlos Kaniowsky, Enrique Villén, Javier Gutiérrez, Fernando Cayo, Luis Callejo	
M A R C H	18	Habana Blues	Director: Benito Zambrano Cast: Benito Joel García, Roberto Sanmartín, Yailene Sierra, Margarita Calvó, Roger Pera	
A P R I L	8	Queens (Reinas)	Director: Manuel Gómez Pereira Cast: Verónica Forqué, Carmen Maura, Marisa Paredes, Mercedes Sampietro, Betiana Blum, Unax Ugalde, Paco León, Hugo Silva, Gustavo Salmerón, Daniel Hendler, Tito Valverde, Lluís Homar	(Note: Co-production Spain–Italy (90%–10%).)
A P R I L	29	Ants in the Mouth (Hormigas en la boca)	Director: Mariano Barroso Cast: Eduard Fernández, Ariadna Gil, Jorge Perugorría, José Luis Gómez	
M A Y	6	Kingdom of Heaven (El reino de los cielos)	Director: Ridley Scott Cast: Orlando Bloom, Eva Green, Liam Neeson, Edward Norton	(Note: Co-production Spain–Germany–United Kingdom–United States (15%–15%–55%–15%).)
M A Y	6	Heroine (Heroína)	Director: Gerardo Herrero Cast: Adriana Ozores, Javier Pereira, Carlos Blanco, María Bouzas, Mercedes Castro	
M A Y	13	Tapas	Director: José Corbacho, Juan Cruz Cast: Elvira Mínguez, Ángel de Andrés, María Galiana	
M A Y	27	Un rey en La Habana	Director: Alexis Valdés Cast: Alexis Valdés, José Téllez, Yoima Valdés, Alicia Bustamante, José Alias, Manuel de Blas, Antonio Dechent, Paulina Gálvez, Carmen Machi, Manuel Manquiña	
J U N E	3	Morir en San Hilario	Director: Laura Mañá Cast: Lluís Homar, Ana Fernández, Ferran Rañé, Ulises Dumont, Juan Echanove	
J U N E	3	The Art of Losing (Perder es cuestión de método)	Director: Sergio Cabrera Cast: Daniel Giménez Cacho, Martina García, César Mora, Víctor Mallarino	
J U N E	10	A Good Woman	Director: Mike Barker Cast: Helen Hunt, Scarlett Johansson, Tom Wilkinson	(Note: Co-production Spain–Italy–United Kingdom (10%–46%–44%).)
J U N E	10	Rottweiler	Director: Brian Yuzna Cast: William Miller, Irene Montalà, Paulina Gálvez, Paul Naschy	
J U N E	10	20 Centimeters (20 centímetros)	Director: Ramón Salazar Cast: Mónica Cervera, Pablo Puyol, Najwa Nimri	(Note: Co-production Spain–France (90%–10%).)
J U N E	24	El Calentito	Director: Chus Gutiérrez Cast: Verónica Sánchez, Macarena Gómez, Juan Sanz, Ruth Díaz, Nuria González, Jordi Vilches, Nilo Mur, Lluvia Rojo, Antonio Dechent, Aitor Merino	
J U L Y	1	Midsummer Dream (El sueño de una noche de San Juan)	Director: Ángel de la Cruz, Manolo Gómez	(Note: Co-production Spain–Portugal (80%–20%).)
J U L Y	15	Semen, A Love Story (Semen, una historia de amor)	Director: Inés París, Daniela Fejerman Cast: Leticia Dolera, Ernesto Alterio, Héctor Alterio	
A U G U S T	12	Ninette	Director: José Luis Garci Cast: Elsa Pataky, Carlos Hipólito, Enrique Villén, Beatriz Carvajal, Fernando Delgado	
A U G U S T	26	The Night of the Brother (La noche del hermano)	Director: Santiago García de Leániz Cast: Jan Cornet, María Vázquez, Pablo Rivero, Iciar Bollain, Joan Dalmau, Luis Tosar	
S E P T E M B E R	2	Princesses (Princesas)	Director: Fernando León de Aranoa Cast: Candela Peña, Micaela Nevárez, Mariana Cordero, Llum Barrera	
S E P T E M B E R	16	Obaba	Director: Montxo Armendáriz Cast: Bárbara Lennie, Juan Diego Botto, Pilar López de Ayala, Eduard Fernández	
S E P T E M B E R	16	The Absent (Ausentes)	Director: Daniel Calparsoro Cast: Jordi Mollá, Ariadna Gil	
S E P T E M B E R	23	The Method (El método)	Director: Marcelo Piñeyro Cast: Ernesto Alterio, Pablo Echarri, Eduard Fernández, Najwa Nimri, Eduardo Noriega, Adriana Ozores, Carmelo Gómez	(Note: Co-production Spain–Italy–Argentina (70%–10%–20%).)
S E P T E M B E R	30	Torrente 3: El protector	Director: Santiago Segura Cast: Santiago Segura, Carlos Latre, José Mota	
O C T O B E R	7	The Outcome (El desenlace)	Director: Juan Pinzás Cast: José Sancho, Beatriz Rico, Carlos Bardem, Javier Gurruchaga, Isabel de Toro, Miquel Insua	
O C T O B E R	7	Other Days Will Come (Otros días vendrán)	Director: Eduard Cortés Cast: Cecilia Roth, Antonio Resines, Fernando Guillén, Nacho Aldeguer, Nadia de Santiago	
O C T O B E R	14	7 Virgins (7 vírgenes)	Director: Alberto Rodríguez Cast: Juan José Ballesta, Jesús Carroza, Alba Rodríguez, Vicente Romero	
O C T O B E R	14	Fragile (Frágiles)	Director: Jaume Balagueró Cast: Calista Flockhart, Richard Roxburgh, Elena Anaya, Gemma Jones, Yasmin Murphy	(Note: Co-production Spain–United Kingdom (80%–20%).)
O C T O B E R	21	The Secret Life of Words (La vida secreta de las palabras)	Director: Isabel Coixet Cast: Tim Robbins, Sarah Polley, Julie Christie, Javier Cámara, Leonor Watling	
O C T O B E R	21	The Uninvited Guest (El habitante incierto)	Director: Guillem Morales Cast: Andoni García, Mónica López, Francesc Garrido, Agustí Villaronga	
O C T O B E R	21	The Aura (El aura)	Director: Fabián Bielinsky Cast: Ricardo Darín, Dolores Fonzi, Pablo Cedrón, Nahuel Pérez Biscayart, Jorge D'Elia, Alejandro Awada	(Note: Spain–Argentina–France co-production.)
N O V E M B E R	4	Camarón: When Flamenco Became Legend (Camarón: la película)	Director: Jaime Chávarri Cast: Óscar Jaenada, Mercè Llorens, Verónica Sánchez	
N O V E M B E R	4	By Force (A golpes)	Director: Juan Vicente Córdoba Cast: Natalia Verbeke, Daniel Guzmán, Juana Acosta, María Vázquez, Marian Álvarez, Zay Nuba	
N O V E M B E R	4	The Hidden (Oculto)	Director: Antonio Hernández Cast: Laia Marull, Leonardo Sbaraglia, Angie Cepeda, Geraldine Chaplin, Joaquín Climent, Gerardo Malla, Emma Cohen	
N O V E M B E R	11	Elsa & Fred	Director: Marcos Carnevale Cast: China Zorrilla, Manuel Alexandre, Blanca Portillo, Federico Luppi	(Note: Co-production Spain–Argentina (80%–20%).)
N O V E M B E R	11	Round Two (Segundo asalto)	Director: Daniel Cebrián Cast: Darío Grandinetti, Álex González, Eva Marciel, Laura Aparicio, Alberto Ferreiro, Maru Valdivielso, Pepo Oliva, Francesc Orella	
N O V E M B E R	18	Hard Times (Malas temporadas)	Director: Manuel Martín Cuenca Cast: Javier Cámara, Nathalie Poza, Leonor Watling, Eman Xor Oña, Pere Arquillué, Gonzalo Pedrosa, Fernando Echebarría, Raquel Vega	
N O V E M B E R	25	Earth's Skin (La piel de la tierra)	Director: Manuel Fernández Cast: Sergio Peris-Mencheta, Carmen del Valle, Manuel de Blas, Manuel Galiana, Pilar Barrera	
N O V E M B E R	25	Sisters (Hermanas)	Director: Julia Solomonoff Cast: Valeria Bertuccelli, Ingrid Rubio, Adrián Navarro, Horacio Peña, Mónica Galán, Nicolás Pauls, Milton de la Canal, Eusebio Poncela	
D E C E M B E R	21	The 2 Sides of the Bed (Los 2 lados de la cama)	Director: Emilio Martínez Lázaro Cast: Ernesto Alterio, Verónica Sánchez, Guillermo Toledo, Lucía Jiménez, Alberto San Juan, María Esteve	

== Box office ==
The ten highest-grossing Spanish films in 2005, by domestic box office gross revenue, are as follows:

Highest-grossing films of 2005
Rank	Title	Distributor	Admissions	Domestic gross (€)
1	Torrente 3: El protector	United International Pictures	3,573,065	18,157,984.07
2	Kingdom of Heaven (El reino de los cielos)	Hispano Foxfilm	2,386,774	11,978,118.38
3	Princesses (Princesas)	Warner Sogefilms	1,168,446	5,983,768.79
4	The Longest Penalty Shot in the World (El penalti más largo del mundo)	Alta Classics	1,054,421	5,136,188.55
5	7 Virgins (7 vírgenes)	Alta Classics	972,474	4,770,059.66
6	Sahara	United International Pictures	765,106	3,792,192.45
7	Tapas	Filmax	735,317	3,770,948.68
8	The 2 Sides of the Bed (Los 2 lados de la cama)	Buena Vista International	682,309	3,392,620.34
9	Habana Blues	Warner Sogefilms	624,501	3,127,706.01
10	Camarón: When Flamenco Became Legend (Camarón)	Buena Vista International	618,833	3,035,931.37

== See also ==
- 20th Goya Awards
- 2005 in film
