= 20th Goya Awards =

Spanish film award ceremony

- Date: 29 January 2006
- Site: Palacio Municipal de Congresos de Madrid
- Hosted by: Concha Velasco; Antonio Resines

Highlights
- Best Film: The Secret Life of Words
- Best Actor: Óscar Jaenada; Camarón: When Flamenco Became Legend
- Best Actress: Candela Peña; Princesses
- Most awards: The Secret Life of Words (4)
- Most nominations: Obaba (10)

Television coverage
- Network: La 1
- Viewership: 2.29 million (18.7%)

The 20th Goya Awards ceremony, presented by the Academy of Cinematographic Arts and Sciences of Spain, took place at the Palacio Municipal de Congresos in Madrid on 29 January 2006. The gala was hosted by Concha Velasco and Antonio Resines.

== Background ==
The nominations were read by Eduardo Noriega and Silvia Abascal at the Círculo de Bellas Artes on 15 December 2005.

The linear television broadcast on La 1 drew 2,294,000 viewers (18.7% audience share).

== Winners and nominees ==
The winners and nominees are listed as follows:

Best Film: The Secret Life of Words; Obaba; Princesses; 7 Virgins	Best Director: Isabel Coixet – The Secret Life of Words; Montxo Armendariz – Obaba; Alberto Rodríguez – 7 Virgins; Benito Zambrano – Habana Blues
Best Actor: Óscar Jaenada – Camarón: When Flamenco Became Legend; Juan José Ballesta – 7 Virgins; Eduard Fernández – The Method; Manuel Alexandre – Elsa & Fred	Best Actress: Candela Peña – Princesses; Emma Vilarasau – Something to Remember Me By; Adriana Ozores – Heroine; Nathalie Poza – Hard Times
Best Supporting Actor: Carmelo Gómez – The Method; Enrique Villén – Ninette; Javier Cámara – The Secret Life of Words; Fernando Guillén – Other Days Will Come	Best Supporting Actress: Elvira Mínguez – Tapas; Pilar López de Ayala – Obaba; Verónica Sánchez – Camarón: When Flamenco Became Legend; Marta Etura – Something to Remember Me By
Best Original Screenplay: Isabel Coixet – The Secret Life of Words; Fernando León de Aranoa – Princesses; Rafael Cobos, Alberto Rodríguez – 7 Virgins; Eduard Cortés, Piti Español – Other Days Will Come	Best Adapted Screenplay: Mateo Gil, Marcelo Piñeyro – The Method; Montxo Armendáriz – Obaba; José Luis Garci, Horacio Valcárcel – Ninette; Roberto Santiago – The Longest Penalty Shot in the World
Best New Actor: Jesús Carroza – 7 Virgins; Luis Callejo – Princesses; Pablo Echarri – The Method; Álex González – Round Two	Best New Actress: Micaela Nevárez – Princesses; Bárbara Lennie – Obaba; Alba Rodríguez – 7 Virgins; Isabel Ampudia – 15 Days With You
Best Spanish Language Foreign Film: Blessed by Fire · Argentina; Alma Mater · Uruguay; My Best Enemy · Chile; Rosario Tijeras · Colombia	Best European Film: Match Point · United Kingdom; Downfall · Germany; The Constant Gardener · United Kingdom; The Chorus · France
Best New Director: José Corbacho, Juan Cruz – Tapas; Asier Altuna, Telmo Esnal – Aupa Etxebeste!; Guillem Morales – The Uninvited Guest; Santiago Tabernero – Life and Colour	Best Animated Film: Midsummer Dream; Gisaku
Best Cinematography: José Luis López Linares – Iberia; Javier Aguirresarobe – Obaba; Raúl Pérez Cubero – Ninette; José Luis Alcaine – Other Days Will Come	Best Editing: Fernando Pardo – Habana Blues; Miguel González Sinde – Ninette; Iván Aledo – The Method; Julia Juániz – Iberia
Best Art Direction: Gil Parrondo – Ninette; Julio Esteban, Julio Torrecilla – Obaba; Félix Murcia, Federico G. Cambero – Something to Remember Me By; Marta Blasco – Round Two	Production Supervision: Esther García – The Secret Life of Words; Puy Oria – Obaba; Tino Pont – Camarón: When Flamenco Became Legend; Ernesto Chao, Eduardo Santana – Habana Blues
Best Sound: Carlos Bonmatí, Alfonso Pino, Pelayo Gutiérrez – Obaba; Miguel Rejas, Alfonso Raposo, Polo Aledo – Princesses; Miguel Rejas, José Antonio Bermúdez – Ninette; Eladio Reguero, David Calleja – Los nombres de Alicia	Best Special Effects: David Martí, Montse Ribé, Félix Cordón, Félix Bergés, Rafael Solórzano – Fragile; Reyes Abades, Chema Remacha, Alberto Esteban, Pablo Urrutia – Obaba; Juan Ramón Molina, Pablo Núñez, Ana Núñez, Antonio Ojeda, Carlos Martínez – Las llaves de la independencia; Reyes Abades, Carlos Lozano, Alberto Esteban, Pablo Núñez, Ana Núñez – Un rey en La Habana
Best Costume Design: María José Iglesias – Camarón: When Flamenco Became Legend; Sabine Daigeler – Princesses; Janty Yates – Kingdom of Heaven; Sonia Grande – Ants in the Mouth	Best Makeup and Hairstyles: Romana González, Josefa Morales – Camarón: When Flamenco Became Legend; Manolo García, Carlos Hernández – Princesses; Jorge Hernández, Fermín Galán – El Calentito; Paillette, Annie Marandin – Les Dalton
Best Original Score: Juan Antonio Leyva, José Luis Garrido, Equis Alfonso, Dayan Abad, Descemer Bueno, Kiki Ferrer, Kelvis Ochoa, Magda Rosa Galbán – Habana Blues; Pablo Cervantes – Ninette; Roque Baños – Fragile; Eva Gancedo – The Night of the Brother	Best Original Song: Manu Chao for "Me llaman calle" – Princesses; Eva Gancedo, Yamil for "Los malos amores" – The Night of the Brother; Mario Gaitán for "Llora por tus miserias" – Bagdad Rap; Dani Martín for "Laura" – Sinfín
Best Fictional Short Film: Nana; Bota de oro; El examinador; El intruso; Hiyab	Best Animated Short Film: Tadeo Jones; La gallina ciega; La leyenda del espantapájaros; La luz de la esperanza; Semilla del recuerdo
Best Documentary: Cineastas contra magnates; Iberia; Trece entre mil; Veinte años no es nada	Best Documentary Short Film: En la cuna del aire; Castilla y León, patrimonio de la Humanidad; Nenyure

=== Films with multiple nominations and awards ===
Films with multiple nominations
Nominations	Film
10	Obaba
9	Princesses
7	Ninette
6	7 Virgins
5	The Secret Life of Words
5	Camarón: When Flamenco Became Legend
5	The Method
4	Habana Blues
3	Something to Remember Me By
3	Other Days Will Come
3	Iberia
2	Tapas
2	Fragile
2	Round Two
2	The Night of the Brother

Films with multiple awards
Awards	Film
4	The Secret Life of Words
3	Princesses
3	Camarón: When Flamenco Became Legend
2	Tapas
2	The Method
2	Habana Blues

== Honorary Goya ==
Director Pedro Masó was the recipient of the Honorary Goya Award.
