= Camarón: When Flamenco Became Legend =

- Theatrical release poster
- Spanish: Camarón: la película
- Directed by: Jaime Chávarri
- Screenplay by: Álvaro del Amo; Jaime Chávarri
- Produced by: Miguel Menéndez de Zubillaga
- Starring: Óscar Jaenada; Verónica Sánchez; Mercè Llorens; Jacobo Dicenta; Martín Belló; Alfonso Begara; Raúl Rocamora
- Cinematography: Gonzalo Berridi
- Edited by: Pablo Blanco
- Production companies: Monoria Films; Filmanova Invest
- Distributed by: Buena Vista International
- Release dates: 18 September 2005 (Zinemaldia); 4 November 2005 (Spain)
- Country: Spain
- Language: Spanish

Camarón: When Flamenco Became Legend (Spanish: Camarón: la película) is a 2005 Spanish biopic film directed by Jaime Chávarri from a screenplay by Chávarri and Álvaro del Amo which stars Óscar Jaenada as Camarón de la Isla along with Verónica Sánchez.

== Plot ==
The plot is a fictionalised version of the life of flamenco singer José Monje Cruz, aka "Camarón de la Isla", depicting his artistic rise and early physical decline.

== Cast ==
- Óscar Jaenada as Camarón
- Verónica Sánchez as la Chispa
- Mercè Llorens as Isabel
- Jacobo Dicenta as Luquitas
- Martín Belló as Manuel
- Alfonso Begara as Tomatito
- Raúl Rocamora as Paco de Lucía
- Manolo Caro as Juan Luis
- Rosa Estévez as Juana
- Chiqui Maya as Paco Cepero
- María Isasi

== Production ==
Produced by Monoria Films and Filmanova Invest, the film had the participation of TVE and Telemadrid. Shooting locations included San Fernando.

== Release ==
The film screened at the 53rd San Sebastián International Film Festival in September 2005. Distributed by Buena Vista International, it was theatrically released in Spain on 4 November 2005.

== Reception ==
Jonathan Holland of Variety considered that, only "redeemed only by a committed perf from young Oscar Jaenada, a few late flourishes and some, but not enough, terrific music", the "predictable" biopic "is hardly the passionate tribute [Camarón de la Isla's] daring genius deserves", seal of approval from his family notwithstanding.

Javier Ocaña of El País noted that whilst the depiction of the facet of the artist's biography pertaining his toxicomania is harmed in the fiction because of certain red lines set by his family, other sides of the film work, both from a purely artistic standpoint, acting-wise, and vis-à-vis the personality of Camarón.

== Accolades ==
Year	Award	Category	Nominee(s)	Result	Ref.
2006	20th Goya Awards	Best Actor	Óscar Jaenada	Won	
2006	20th Goya Awards	Best Supporting Actress	Verónica Sánchez	Nominated	
2006	20th Goya Awards	Best Production Supervision	Tino Pont	Nominated	
2006	20th Goya Awards	Best Costume Design	María José Iglesias	Won	
2006	20th Goya Awards	Best Makeup and Hairstyles	Josefa Morales, Romana González	Won	
2006	15th Actors and Actresses Union Awards	Best Film Actor in a Leading Role	Óscar Jaenada	Nominated	

== See also ==
- List of Spanish films of 2005
