= Fill Me with Life =

- Theatrical release poster
- Spanish: Báilame el agua
- Directed by: Josecho San Mateo
- Screenplay by: Daniel Valdés; Ricardo González Iglesias; Mónica Pérez Capilla
- Based on: Báilame el agua by Daniel Valdés
- Starring: Unax Ugalde; Pilar López de Ayala; Juan Díaz
- Cinematography: Juan Molina
- Edited by: José Salcedo
- Music by: Miguel Ángel Magüesín
- Production companies: Plot Films; Cre Acción Films
- Distributed by: Lauren Film
- Release dates: October 2000 (Seminci); 3 November 2000 (Spain)
- Country: Spain
- Language: Spanish

Fill Me with Life (Spanish: Báilame el agua) is a 2000 Spanish drama film directed by Josecho San Mateo which stars Unax Ugalde and Pilar López de Ayala alongside Juan Díaz. It is based on the novel Báilame el agua by Daniel Valdés.

== Plot ==
Set in Madrid, the plot tracks the downward spiral of the couple formed by María and David into drug use, prostitution, organised crime, and social exclusion.

== Cast ==
- Unax Ugalde as David
- Pilar López de Ayala as María
- Juan Díaz as Carlos
- Benjamín Seva
- Fede Celada as Abundio
- Antonio Dechent as Facundo
- Beatriz Argüello as Verónica
- Juan Viadas
- Ion Gabella
- Carlos Kaniowski
- Beatriz Sánchez
- Jesús Fuente
- Nuria Mencía

== Production ==
Based on the novel by Daniel Valdés, the screenplay was written with the collaboration from Ricardo González Iglesias and Mónica Pérez Capilla. The film was produced by Plot Films alongside Els Quatre Gats and Cre Acción Films.

== Release ==
Selected for the official competition slate of the 45th Valladolid International Film Festival (Seminci), the film was presented in October 2000. Distributed by Lauren Film, the film was theatrically released in Spain on 3 November 2000.

== Reception ==
Ángel Fernández-Santos of El País deemed the film to be a "lively and undoubtedly risky fiction", "but stylistically it does not live up to that risk and ambition, and it is stammering and imprecise" vis-à-vis the depiction of the "hellish dumps where the human plunderings of drug and juvenile destitution rot in Madrid".

== Accolades ==
Year	Award	Category	Nominee(s)	Result	Ref.
2001	45th Sant Jordi Awards	Best Actress	Pilar López de Ayala	Won	

== See also ==
- List of Spanish films of 2000
