= Elsa & Fred (2014 film) =

- Directed by: Michael Radford
- Written by: Michael Radford; Anna Pavignano
- Based on: Elsa y Fred by: Marcos Carnevale; Marcela Guerty; Lily Ann Martin
- Produced by: Matthias Ehrenberg; Ricardo Kleinbaum; José Levy; Edward Saxon; Nicolas Veinberg; Rob Weston
- Starring: Shirley MacLaine; Christopher Plummer; Marcia Gay Harden; Wendell Pierce; Jared Gilman; Chris Noth; Scott Bakula
- Cinematography: Michael McDonough
- Edited by: Peter Boyle
- Distributed by: Millennium Entertainment
- Release dates: March 7, 2014 (Miami International Film Festival); November 7, 2014
- Running time: 94 minutes
- Country: United States
- Language: English

Elsa & Fred is a 2014 American comedy-drama film directed by Michael Radford. It was produced by Matthias Ehrenberg, Ed Saxon, Jose Levy, Nicolas Veinberg and Rob Weston. The film stars Shirley MacLaine and Christopher Plummer. The film, set and filmed in New Orleans, is an English-language remake of the 2005 Spanish-Argentine film of the same name. It was the final film appearance of George Segal before he died on March 23, 2021.

== Plot ==
The recently widowed, 80-year-old Fred Barcroft is moved by his daughter, against his will, into an apartment in New Orleans, next door to 74-year-old Elsa Hayes. Fred has become embittered, considers himself a realist, but spends most of his time lying down. Elsa is a flighty, vivacious romanticist who dreams of "the sweet life in Rome," as lived by Anita Ekberg in the 1961 film La Dolce Vita. Despite their opposite temperaments and outlooks on life, they fall in love.

Elsa coaxes Fred out of his shell, but tries his patience by telling him several lies about herself. She claims to be a widow and hides her severe kidney disease, which requires dialysis. Fred does not know whether or not to believe Elsa's claim that Pablo Picasso made a painting of her. She says that she has it in a safe, for which she has misplaced the key.

Erika Alexander plays the aide Laverne, who regularly cares for Fred. As she sees him daily, she provides a lively counterpoint and commentary on his developing relationship with Elsa.

When Fred learns from his doctor friend John that Elsa is probably dying, he takes her to Rome to fulfill her dream of wading (like Ekberg) in the Trevi Fountain. He chooses this rather than investing in his son-in-law's dubious business venture. After Elsa dies, her son opens her safe and gives Fred the painting by Picasso, which Elsa bequeathed to him.

== Cast ==
- Shirley MacLaine as Elsa Hayes
- Christopher Plummer as Fred Barcroft
- Marcia Gay Harden as Lydia Barcroft, Fred's Daughter
- Chris Noth as Jack, Lydia's Husband
- Jared Gilman as Michael, Fred's Grandson
- Scott Bakula as Raymond Hayes, Elsa's Eldest Son
- Deanna Meske as Laura Hayes, Raymond's Wife
- McCartney Bisgard as Carla Hayes
- Erika Alexander as Laverne
- Reg Rogers as Alec Hayes, Elsa's Youngest Son
- George Segal as John, Fred's Doctor and Friend
- James Brolin as Max Hayes, Elsa's Estranged Husband
- Wendell Pierce as Armande, The Building Superintendent
- Osvaldo Ríos as Doctor

== Production ==
The film was shot on location in New Orleans because of tax incentives, according to MacLaine. Plummer declared he does not consider it a remake of the 2005 film, as "Shirley and I, and Michael totally rewrote it. So I prefer to think of it as the English-language version."

The scene in Rome where MacLaine and Plummer wade into the Trevi Fountain is shot in black and white, to mimic the corresponding scene in La Dolce Vita.

== Release and reception ==
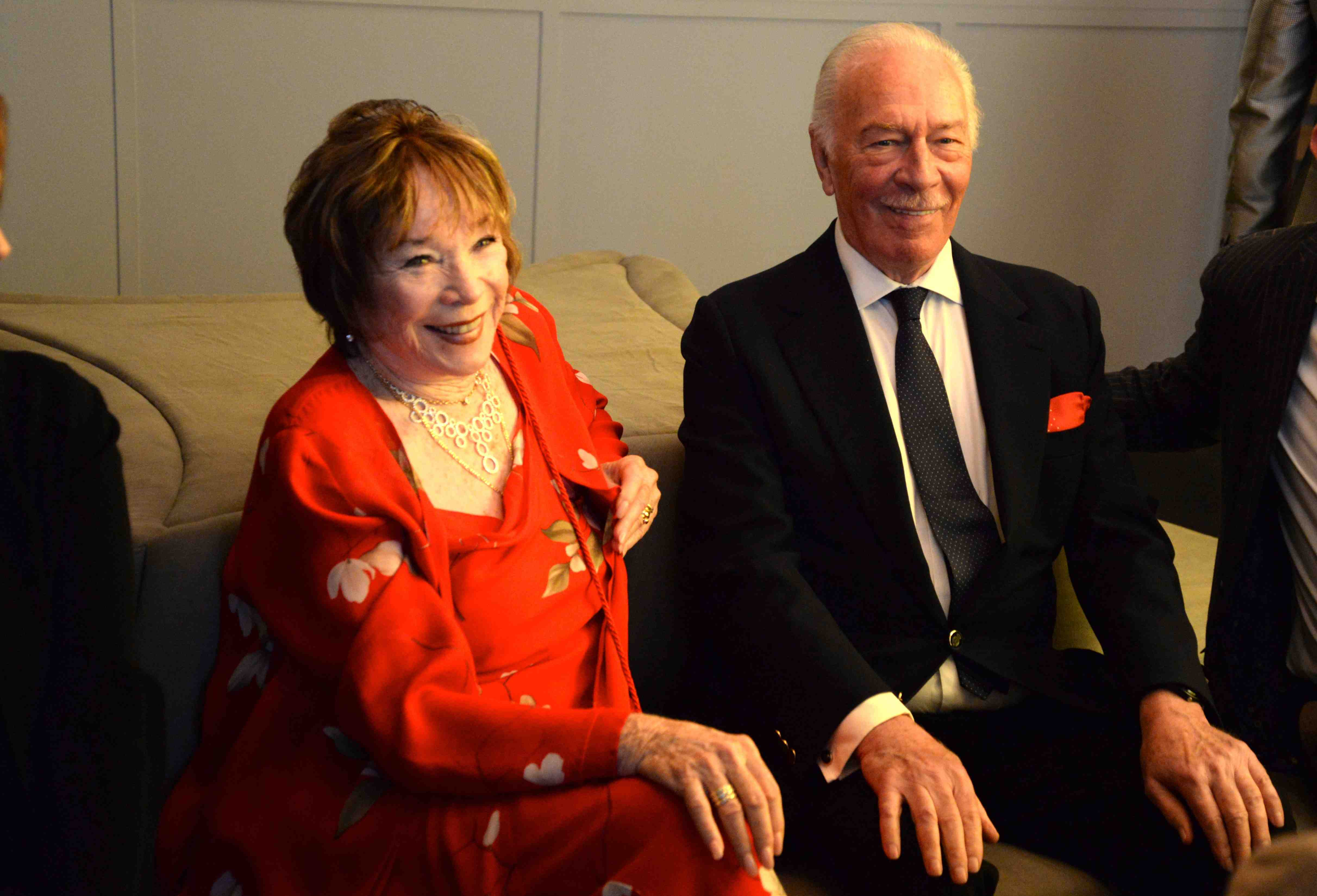
MacLaine and Plummer at the Miami International Film Festival premiere of the film.

During the 2014 Miami International Film Festival in March, Elsa & Fred received a "roaring response", according to John Anderson of IndieWire. In September, at the 2014 Cinéfest Sudbury International Film Festival, it was awarded the Audience Choice Award. However, Rich Heldenfels said the film "was not well received" and pointed out that reviews "are mostly negative".

The film was released by Millennium Entertainment in the United States on November 7, 2014 in select theaters.
