= El Calentito =

- Theatrical release poster
- Directed by: Chus Gutiérrez
- Screenplay by: Juan Carlos Rubio; Chus Gutiérrez
- Produced by: Tomás Cimadevilla
- Starring: Verónica Sánchez; Macarena Gómez; Juan Sanz; Ruth Díaz; Nuria González; Aitor Merino; Estíbaliz Gabilondo; Nilo Mur; Lluvia Rojo; Jordi Vilches; Antonio Dechent; Isabel Ordaz; Mariano Peña
- Cinematography: Kiko de la Rica
- Edited by: Nacho Ruiz Capillas
- Production companies: Telespan 2000; Estudios Picasso
- Distributed by: Buena Vista International
- Release dates: 24 April 2005 (Málaga); 24 June 2005 (Spain)
- Country: Spain
- Language: Spanish

El Calentito is a 2005 Spanish musical comedy film directed and co-written by Chus Gutiérrez. The cast stars Verónica Sánchez alongside Macarena Gómez, Juan Sanz, Ruth Díaz and Nuria González.

== Plot ==
It is set in 1981 in Spain, having the so-called "movida madrileña" as a backdrop. Sara, a virgin girl, gets drunk after being abandoned by her boyfriend Toni. She joins all-female punk act "Las Siux" (initially formed by Leo, Carmen and Chus) after being told to replace Chus, who is leaving over personal and artistic discrepancies with the rest of the band. She is set to make her debut onstage on 23 February 1981, a date otherwise marked by the Tejero's coup d'état attempt.

== Cast ==
- Verónica Sánchez as Sara
- Macarena Gómez as Leo
- Juan Sanz as Ernesto
- Ruth Díaz as Carmen
- Nuria González as Antonia
- Aitor Merino as Toni
- Estíbaliz Gabilondo as Marta
- Jordi Vilches as Ferdy
- Lluvia Rojo as Chus
- Nilo Mur as Jorge
- Antonio Dechent as Sr. Matas
- Isabel Ordaz as Ana
- Mariano Peña as Antonio.

== Production ==
The screenplay was penned by Gutiérrez alongside Juan Carlos Rubio, and tried to depict both the "movida madrileña" and the "Transition". Gutiérrez herself had been a member of a band in the 1980s, Las Xoxonees. A Telespan 2000 and Estudios Picasso production, with the participation of Canal+, the film was shot in 2004 in Madrid.

== Release ==
The film screened at the 8th Málaga Spanish Film Festival (FMCE) in April 2005. Distributed by Buena Vista Internacional, it was theatrically released in Spain on 24 June 2005.

== Reception ==
Jonathan Holland of Variety considered that "thankfully lacking the earnestness of many movies with the same theme, pic's sheer exuberance carries it through its flaws".

Reviewing for Fotogramas, Esteve Riambau rated it with 3 out of 5 stars considering that with "without renouncing a critical and progressive vision" the film's point of view "avoids complacency like the plague", highlighting the film's self-ironic proposal and biographical honesty while citing the sometimes over-the-top caricature of the bad guys and some historical licenses as negative points.

Reviewing for El País, Casimiro Torreiro considers that Gutiérrez comes out of it well with her "self-ironic" proposal, writing that the story features "a desire to come to terms with the past, but also the will to do so with sufficient doses of irony so that there is no opportunity for nostalgia to show itself".

== Accolades ==
Year	Award	Category	Nominee(s)	Result	Ref.
2005	8th Málaga Spanish Film Festival	Silver Biznaga for Best Cinematography	Kiko de la Rica	Won	
2005	8th Málaga Spanish Film Festival	AISGE Award for Best New Performer	Nuria González	Won	
2006	20th Goya Awards	Best Makeup and Hairstyles	Fermín Galán, Jorge Hernández	Nominated	
2006	15th Actors and Actresses Union Awards	Best New Actress	Ruth Díaz	Nominated	

== See also ==
- List of Spanish films of 2005
