= Something to Remember Me By (film) =

- Theatrical release poster
- Spanish: Para que no me olvides
- Directed by: Patricia Ferreira
- Screenplay by: Virginia Yagüe; Patricia Ferreira
- Produced by: Pancho Casal
- Starring: Emma Vilarasau; Fernando Fernán-Gómez; Marta Etura; Roger Coma
- Cinematography: Marcelo Camorino
- Edited by: Carmen Frías
- Production companies: Continental Producciones; Televisión de Galicia
- Distributed by: Alta Classics
- Release dates: February 2005 (Berlinale); 18 February 2005 (Spain)
- Language: Spanish

Something to Remember Me By (Spanish: Para que no me olvides) is a 2005 Spanish drama film directed by Patricia Ferreira which stars Emma Vilarasau, Fernando Fernán-Gómez, Marta Etura, and Roger Coma.

== Plot ==
The plot concerns about a family drama involving director Irene, her aging father Mateo and her son David, an architecture student who maintains a relation with cashier Clara. Upon the death of David in a car accident, Mateo begins to write his grandson's story.

== Cast ==
- Emma Vilarasau as Irene
- Fernando Fernán-Gómez as Mateo
- Marta Etura as Clara
- Roger Coma as David
- Víctor Mosqueira as Antonio
- Mónica García as Ana

== Production ==
The screenplay was penned by Patricia Ferreira and Virginia Yagüe. The film was produced by Continental Producciones alongside Televisión de Galicia. It also had the participation of TVE and Canal+.

It was shot in the Madrid region and the province of A Coruña, including the Langosteira Beach.

== Release ==
The film premiered at the 55th Berlin International Film Festival in February 2005, presented as a 'Special Screening' out of competition. Distributed by Alta Classics, it was theatrically released in Spain on 18 February 2005.

== Reception ==
Jonathan Holland of Variety deemed the "tightly buttoned, trigenerational family drama" to be "worthy but dull".

The review in El País observed that despite the film starting with "cheesy" trappings, the plot takes a "spectacular turn" by dealing a "brutal blow", eventually underpinning the film as "one of those movies that serve to learn more about life".

== Accolades ==
Year	Award	Category	Nominee(s)	Result	Ref.
2006	20th Goya Awards	Best Actress	Emma Vilarasau	Nominated	
2006	20th Goya Awards	Best Supporting Actress	Marta Etura	Nominated	
2006	20th Goya Awards	Best Art Direction	Federico G. Gambero, Félix Murcia	Nominated	
2006	4th Mestre Mateo Awards	Best Film		Nominated	
2006	4th Mestre Mateo Awards	Best Director	Patricia Ferreira	Nominated	
2006	4th Mestre Mateo Awards	Best Actor	Fernando Fernán-Gómez	Won	
2006	4th Mestre Mateo Awards	Best Supporting Actress	Marta Etura	Nominated	
2006	4th Mestre Mateo Awards	Best Supporting Actor	Víctor Mosqueira	Nominated	
2006	15th Actors and Actresses Union Awards	Best Film Actress in a Secondary Role	Marta Etura	Nominated	

== See also ==
- List of Spanish films of 2005
