= 7 Virgins =

2005 Spanish crime film

- Film poster
- Spanish: 7 vírgenes
- Directed by: Alberto Rodríguez
- Screenplay by: Rafael Cobos; Alberto Rodríguez
- Starring: Juan José Ballesta; Jesús Carroza; Vicente Romero; Alba Rodríguez; Julián Villagrán; Ana Wagener; Maite Sandoval; Manolo Solo
- Cinematography: Alex Catalán
- Edited by: José M. G. Moyano
- Music by: Julio de la Rosa
- Production companies: Tesela PC; La Zanfoña Producciones
- Distributed by: Alta Classics
- Release dates: September 2005 (Toronto); 14 October 2005 (Spain)
- Running time: 86 minutes
- Country: Spain
- Language: Spanish

7 Virgins (Spanish: 7 vírgenes) (Note: The film is named after a ritual involving Mary mentioned on the film.) is a 2005 Spanish crime film directed by Alberto Rodríguez which stars Juan José Ballesta and Jesús Carroza. The film follows Tano, a juvenile delinquent in Seville that is given parole for a weekend.

== Plot ==
In Seville, 16-year-old delinquent Tano is granted a 48-hour parole. His older brother José picks him up and invites him to his wedding, on the condition that Tano behaves himself over the weekend. However, shortly after arriving home, Tano steals money from his family and goes to a shopping mall with his friend Richi. There, Richi pickpockets a stranger, who quickly realizes the theft, prompting a chase by mall security. After narrowly escaping, Tano scolds Richi, warning him that further trouble could put him in permanent imprisonment. The pair then encounter José María, a man Richi has previously scammed by selling him a broken car stereo. José María demands his money back, but Richi persuades him to give the car stereo another chance. At a bar, Richi proposes Tano to escape during the parole, but Tano rejects it, unwilling to become a fugitive.

After spending time with his girlfriend, Patri, Tano reunites with Richi at a nightclub, where they meet two girls. As the evening progresses, Tano stays with one of them while she vomits in the bathroom and later frustrates Richi's attempt to the rape the other girl. The following day, they commit a burglary at a sportswear store, but are forced to flee when the owners pursue them. While wandering the streets afterward, Tano notices an obituary posted on a streetlight, which prompts memories of a car accident in which his mother died.

Upon returning home, Tano is confronted by José over the stolen money. He passes the night with Patri, but she ends their relationship confessing that her feelings towards him have changed. Back in his neighborhood, Tano joins Richi and a group of youths in an attack on a local pub. Although initially too despondent to take part, Tano is provoked and ends up violently assaulting another man, rendering him unconscious. As Tano prepares for the wedding, José appears deeply disillusioned, though he does not explain himself. Richi is confronted by José María again, who wants the money back immediately. While pretending to go back to his apartment to get the money, Richi secretly escapes to the wedding.

Following the wedding, Tano and Richi discuss their future, with Richi showing Tano an apartment he hopes to purchase. As they part ways, José María appears and violently assaults Richi. Bystanders intervene to assist Richi and restrain José María, while Tano remains frozen, unable to act. Later, José drives Tano back to the detention center. Realizing that no one in his neighborhood has a future, regardless of whether they follow the law or not, Tano begs José to let him go. After initial hesitation, José tearfully agrees, allowing Tano to flee and become a fugitive.

== Cast ==
- Juan José Ballesta as Tano
- Jesús Carroza as Richi
- Vicente Romero as Santacana
- Alba Rodríguez as Patri
- Julián Villagrán as José María
- Ana Wagener as Richi's mother
- Maite Sandoval as Patri's mother
- Manolo Solo as the director of the youth center
- Antonio Dechent

== Production ==
The screenplay was penned by Rodríguez and Rafael Cobos. The film is a Tesela PC and La Zanfoña Producciones production. It was shot in Seville in 2004.

== Release ==
Distributed by Alta Classics, the film was released theatrically in Spain on 14 October 2005.

== Accolades ==
Year	Award	Category	Nominee(s)	Result	Ref.
2006	20th Goya Awards	Best Film		Nominated	
2006	20th Goya Awards	Best Director	Alberto Rodríguez	Nominated	
2006	20th Goya Awards	Best Original Screenplay	Rafael Cobos, Alberto Rodríguez	Nominated	
2006	20th Goya Awards	Best Actor	Juan José Ballesta	Nominated	
2006	20th Goya Awards	Best New Actor	Jesús Carroza	Won	
2006	20th Goya Awards	Best New Actress	Alba Rodríguez	Nominated	
2006	15th Actors and Actresses Union Awards	Best New Actor	Jesús Carroza	Nominated	

== See also ==
- List of Spanish films of 2005
