= Round Two (film) =

- Theatrical release poster
- Spanish: Segundo asalto
- Directed by: Daniel Cebrián
- Screenplay by: Daniel Cebrián; Imanol Uribe
- Produced by: Andrés Santana; Gustavo Ferrada; Imanol Uribe; Eva Muslera
- Starring: Darío Grandinetti; Álex González; Eva Marciel; Laura Aparicio; Alberto Ferreiro; Maru Valdivielso; Pepo Oliva; Francesc Orella
- Cinematography: Gonzalo Berridi
- Edited by: Buster Franco
- Music by: Iván Miguélez
- Production companies: Aiete-Ariane Films; Sogecine
- Release dates: 27 October 2005 (Seminci); 11 November 2005 (Spain)
- Country: Spain
- Language: Spanish

Round Two (Spanish: Segundo asalto) is a 2005 Spanish drama film directed by Daniel Cebrián which stars Álex González and Darío Grandinetti.

== Plot ==
The plot follows the uneasy relationship of young and honest boxer Ángel with ex-boxer and purported bank robber Vidal.

== Cast ==
- Álex González as Ángel
- Pepo Oliva as Paco 'el Tigre'
- Eva Marciel as Alicia
- Maru Valdivielso as Estrella
- Darío Grandinetti as Vidal
- Laura Aparicio as Pilar
- Francesc Orella as Mendiri
- Alberto Ferreiro as Dienteputo

== Production ==
The film was produced by Aiete-Ariane Films and Sogecine. It was fully shot in Madrid.

== Release ==
The film was presented at the Valladolid International Film Festival (Seminci) in October 2005. Distributed by Warner Sogefilms, it was released theatrically in Spain on 11 November 2005.

== Reception ==
Jonathan Holland of Variety wrote that the film "welds fight, heist and family drama elements into something that resonates way beyond the sum of its parts" otherwise signalling at a "superbly reptilian perf" by Grandinetti.

Casimiro Torreiro of El País deemed Round Two to be "competent and remarkably directed and performed".

== Accolades ==
Year	Award	Category	Nominee(s)	Result	Ref.
2006	20th Goya Awards	Best New Actor	Álex González	Nominated	
2006	20th Goya Awards	Best Art Direction	Marta Blasco	Nominated	
2006	15th Actors and Actresses Union Awards	Best New Actor	Álex González	Nominated	

== See also ==
- List of Spanish films of 2005
