= The Uninvited Guest (2004 film) =

- Spanish: El habitante incierto
- Directed by: Guillem Morales
- Written by: Guillem Morales
- Music by: Marc Vaíllo
- Production companies: Rodar y Rodar; Canal+ España; Televisió de Catalunya; Televisión Española
- Release dates: 6 December 2004 (Sitges); 21 October 2005 (Spain)
- Running time: 109 min
- Country: Spain
- Language: Spanish

The Uninvited Guest (Spanish: El habitante incierto) is a 2004 Spanish mystery thriller film and the directorial debut of Guillem Morales. It stars Andoni Gracia, Mónica López and Francesc Garrido.

== Plot ==
Felix (Gracia) is an architect who lives in a large house. He appears to be sensitive about visitors after a recent separation from his wife Vera (López). One night, a man asks to come in and use the phone. Felix allows him to do so and leaves the room for a few minutes, but then he discovers the man is nowhere to be seen. For the next few days, Felix hears strange noises in the house, suspecting the man actually never left. Felix then calls the police who are unable to find anything. He later calls Vera and asks her to visit him, eventually resulting in them having sex. But he becomes paranoid when he thinks he hears her talking to someone in the kitchen and accidentally injures her with a knife.

Felix's suspicions are heightened when his neighbour's dog enters the house and appears to hear noises from upstairs too. His neighbour, Mrs Müller, runs after the dog and appears to be thrown down the stairs, killing herself and her dog in the process. The police determine that she merely slipped accidentally. Eventually, Felix encounters someone in his house and shoots him, leaving that person locked in the attic. Felix locks down his house, throws the keys in the sewer and leaves. He naps in his car until he is awakened by two children who are looking at a picture that Felix drew of the strange man. They identify him as "Martin" and points Felix towards Martin's house.

Felix sneaks into Martin's house and sees Martin's wife; Claudia (also played by López) who is paralysed from the waist down following a recent accident. Felix stays hidden in her house for the next few days and knows that Martin is an archeologist who is currently away on a business trip. He also discovers that Martin has been unkind to Claudia since her accident. Felix becomes infatuated with Claudia and manages to speak to her by hiding in plain sight at a surprise birthday party.

Eventually, Felix alerts Claudia and Martin's friend Bruno to his presence by breaking a vase and finding a key to the locked door of the basement. Claudia reveals to Bruno that she actually locked Martin in the basement. Felix escapes the house through the basement (getting stabbed by Bruno in the process and possibly injuring or killing Bruno and Claudia in turn), which leads to a tunnel where he finds Martin's corpse. The tunnel leads to Felix's own basement. Felix climbs upstairs and discovers that the "man" he had shot a couple of nights ago was actually Vera who, dying on the floor, reveals she is pregnant.

== Cast ==
- Andoni Gracia as Félix
- Mónica López as Claudia / Vera
- Francesc Garrido as Bruno
- Agustí Villaronga as Martín
- Minnie Marx as Sra. Mueller
- Pablo Derqui as Policía 1
- Violeta Llueca as Policía 2
- Xavier Capdet as Policía atestados
- Pere Abelló as Antonio
- Fina Rius as Alicia
- Xènia Gausa as Chica
- Gemma Lozano Bernabéu as Niña
- Daniel Casadellà Silva as Niño
- Ruben Ametllé as Diego
- Abel Coll as Chico mudanza

== Release ==
The film premiered at the 37th Sitges Film Festival in December 2004. The film was theatrically released in Spain on 21 October 2015.

== Reception ==
Mónica López clinched the Best Actress Award at Sitges for her double role in the film. Morales was nominated for the Goya Award for Best New Director the 20th Goya Awards for his work on The Uninvited Guest.

== See also ==
- List of Spanish films of 2005
- List of films featuring home invasions
