= Hard Times (2005 film) =

- Theatrical release poster
- Spanish: Malas temporadas
- Directed by: Manuel Martín Cuenca
- Screenplay by: Manuel Martín Cuenca; Alejandro Hernández
- Story by: Alejandro Hernández
- Produced by: Fernando Victoria de Lecea; Pedro Zaratiegui
- Starring: Javier Cámara; Nathalie Poza; Eman Xor Oña; Leonor Watling
- Cinematography: David Carretero
- Edited by: Ángel Hernández Zoido
- Music by: Pedro Barbadillo
- Production companies: Iberrota Films; Golem; Loma Blanca
- Distributed by: Golem
- Release dates: 22 September 2005 (Zinemaldia); 18 November 2005 (Spain)
- Country: Spain
- Language: Spanish

Hard Times (Spanish: Malas temporadas) is a 2005 Spanish drama film directed by Manuel Martín Cuenca from a screenplay by Martín Cuenca and Alejandro Hernández which stars Javier Cámara, Nathalie Poza, Eman Xor Oña, and Leonor Watling.

== Plot ==
Set in Madrid, the plot concerns about connected personal stories: those of a former inmate adapting to life out of jail (Mikel), a NGO worker (Ana), and a Cuban immigrant and smuggler of cigars and artwork (Carlos).

== Cast ==
- Javier Cámara as Mikel
- Nathalie Poza as Ana
- Eman Xor Oña as Carlos
- Leonor Watling as Laura
- Fernando Echebarria as Fabré
- Gonzalo Pedrosa as Gonzalo
- Pere Arquillué as Pascual
- Raquel Vega as Rita

== Release ==
The film was presented at the 53rd San Sebastián International Film Festival in September 2005. It was theatrically released in Spain on 18 November 2005.

== Reception ==
Fionnuala Halligan of ScreenDaily deemed the film to be "nicely-modulated and finely-acted", considering that, despite its "downbeat perspective", Hard Times is a "rewarding and challenging" film.

Javier Ocaña of El País considered that even if, as almost always with choral stories, some of the stories work better than others, the whole is "very well crafted", underpinning a portrait of current-day sorrows "as real as it is pessimistic".

== Accolades ==
Year	Award	Category	Nominee(s)	Result	Ref.
2005	San Sebastián International Film Festival	Sebastiane Award		Won	
2006	20th Goya Awards	Best Actress	Nathalie Poza	Nominated	
2006	15th Actors and Actresses Union Awards	Best Film Actor in a Leading Role	Javier Cámara	Nominated	
2006	15th Actors and Actresses Union Awards	Best Film Actress in a Leading Role	Nathalie Poza	Nominated	

== See also ==
- List of Spanish films of 2005
