= Obaba =

2005 film

- Theatrical release poster
- Directed by: Montxo Armendáriz
- Screenplay by: Montxo Armendáriz
- Based on: Obabakoak by Bernardo Atxaga
- Produced by: Puy Oria; Montxo Armendáriz; Karl Baumgartner; Michael Eckelt
- Starring: Pilar López de Ayala; Juan Diego Botto; Bárbara Lennie; Eduard Fernández; Peter Lohmeyer
- Cinematography: Javier Aguirresarobe
- Edited by: Rori Sáinz de Rozas
- Music by: Xavier Capellas
- Release dates: 9 September 2005 (TIFF); 16 September 2005 (Spain)
- Running time: 1h 40min
- Countries: Spain; Germany
- Language: Spanish

Obaba is a 2005 Spanish-German drama film directed by Montxo Armendáriz based on Bernardo Atxaga's novel Obabakoak. It features Pilar López de Ayala, Juan Diego Botto, Bárbara Lennie, Eduard Fernández, and Peter Lohmeyer.

Obaba was selected as the Spanish entry for the Best Foreign Language Film at the 78th Academy Awards, but it was not nominated.

== Cast ==
- Pilar López de Ayala as maestra
- Juan Diego Botto as Miguel
- Bárbara Lennie as Lourdes
- Eduard Fernández as Lucas
- Peter Lohmeyer as ingeniero
- Héctor Colomé Ismael
- Pepa López as Merche
- Lluís Homar as Esteban adulto
- Txema Blasco as Tomás
- Iñake Irastorza as Begoña
- Christian Tardío as Manuel
- Ryan Cameron as Esteban niño
- Vanesa Moñino as Merche niña
- Alejandro Jiménez as Ismael niño

== Release ==
The film was released theatrically in Spain on 16 September 2005.

== Accolades ==
Year	Award	Category	Nominee(s)	Result	Ref.
2006	20th Goya Awards	Best Film		Nominated	
2006	20th Goya Awards	Best Director	Montxo Armendáriz	Nominated	
2006	20th Goya Awards	Best Supporting Actress	Pilar López de Ayala	Nominated	
2006	20th Goya Awards	Best Adapted Screenplay	Montxo Armendáriz	Nominated	
2006	20th Goya Awards	Best New Actress	Bárbara Lennie	Nominated	
2006	20th Goya Awards	Best Cinematography	Javier Aguirresarobe	Nominated	
2006	20th Goya Awards	Best Art Direction	Julio Esteban, Julio Torrecilla	Nominated	
2006	20th Goya Awards	Best Production Supervision	Puy Oria	Nominated	
2006	20th Goya Awards	Best Sound	Carlos Bonmatí, Alfonso Pino, Pelayo Gutiérrez	Won	
2006	20th Goya Awards	Best Special Effects	Alberto Esteban, José María Remacha, Pablo Urrutia, Reyes Abades	Nominated	
2006	11th Forqué Awards	Best Film		Nominated	
2006	15th Actors and Actresses Union Awards	Best Film Actress in a Secondary Role	Pilar López de Ayala	Nominated	

== See also ==
- List of Spanish films of 2005
- List of submissions to the 78th Academy Awards for Best Foreign Language Film
- List of Spanish submissions for the Academy Award for Best Foreign Language Film
