= Orbiter 9 =

- Spanish: Órbita 9
- Directed by: Hatem Khraiche
- Written by: Hatem Khraiche
- Produced by: Christian Conti; Miguel Menéndez de Zubilaga; Gabriel Arias-Salgado
- Starring: Clara Lago; Álex González
- Cinematography: Pau Esteve
- Edited by: Antonio Frutos
- Music by: Federico Jusid
- Distributed by: Cactus Flower; Dynamo; Mono Films; Telefonica Studios
- Release date: April 7, 2017
- Running time: 95 minutes
- Countries: Spain; Colombia
- Language: Spanish

Orbiter 9 (Spanish: Órbita 9) is a 2017 science fiction romantic drama directed by Hatem Khraiche in his directorial debut. It stars Clara Lago and Álex González. The film premiered in Spain on April 7, 2017.

== Plot ==
Helena is a woman in her 20s who has lived all of her life on the Orbiter 9 space craft. Her parents had told her, by archived video, their intent to commit suicide so that Helena could survive, due to a depletion of oxygen. The orbiter's computer, Rebecca, cared for her. With oxygen levels low, another spaceship docks with hers and a maintenance engineer named Alex boards for repairs. Helena quickly develops romantic feelings for Alex, and later enters his sleeping quarters, convincing him to make love to her as it may be her only opportunity.

When Alex leaves to return to his ship, he emerges into a wooded area, within a guarded research compound on Earth. He drives to the main building and reports to scientist Hugo, head of one of four international sites secretly conducting space simulation experiments on human test subjects. The aim of the research is to conduct an eventual voyage to Celeste, a habitable planet orbiting in Alpha Centauri, since Earth's oceans are poisoned and the environment no longer able to support future generations.

Alex has been depressed since a Celeste-bound ship piloted by androids he created exploded, killing 207 human passengers on board. Hugo reminds him that departure is 20 years away, and accidents are inevitable.

Alex regularly visits Silvia, a therapist, and tells her about his feelings for Helena. Alex, unable to stop thinking about Helena, returns to her in his normal Earth clothes and reveals the truth of her situation. He uses video and bio-feeds from recorded records so no one at mission control will know she is gone, and smuggles her to his apartment.

Alex exposes Helena to the world, even going to a bar with his friends, including Xiao, a doctor. When Helena develops a rash on her shoulder, Alex takes her to Xiao. Xiao is suspicious of how her skin appears to have never been exposed to sunlight, but promises to get back to them with his test results.

While Alex is out, Helena explores the apartment. She has been given access to Alex's secure office, where she discovers files containing information suggesting she may be a cloned human being. Finding the address in the Orbital dossiers, she hunts down her parents, who are married program scientists unrelated to her. They explain that the subjects are clones of people who have been dead for two generations, so they consider her to be as unique as anybody else. Pretending he is making coffee, Helena's father instead returns and handcuffs her to a railing so he can call security. Helena's mother knocks him out and lets Helena escape.

Helena returns to Alex, angry with him, but trusts his apologies. Alex reaches out to Silvia for help; she offers to hide them in an apartment she owns. Hugo, leading the manhunt, searches Alex's apartment and finds Silvia's contact data. While Alex and Helena pick up the key from Silvia, Hugo and his guards arrive. Suspecting the couple is hiding there, he shoots Silvia in the head, causing Helena to cry out while hidden. The two then flee over the rooftops. Helena injures her leg and later insists Alex jumps across a rooftop, to show her how it is done, but she does not follow and is captured. Alex is able to escape.

Hugo is instructed by Katherine, his superior, to terminate Helena, as she is now both a professional liability and of no further use to the research project. Alex hears from Xiao, who tells him Helena cannot survive life outside the simulator. Alex calls Hugo and offers him a deal, if he can see Helena. He drives to the control centre and is shot and captured attempting to reach Hugo. Alex informs Hugo of the news he learned from Xiao: Helena is six weeks pregnant.

Hugo and Katherine agree that the Project can gain valuable insights by observing a real birth and subsequent growth of a family group inside Orbiter 9. Helena tells Hugo she has one condition if she and Alex are to return to Orbiter 9. Some years later, a girl exits Orbiter 9 in the forest and is greeted by a satisfied but aged Hugo. An unrevealed figure steps out behind the girl as she smiles.

== Cast ==
- Clara Lago as Helena
- Álex González as Álex
- Andrés Parra as Hugo
- Belén Rueda as Silvia
- Kristina Lilley as Katherine
- John Alex Castillo as Dr. Xiao
- Fernando Campo as Helena's Father
- Sara Deray as Helena's Mother

== Reception ==
On review aggregator Rotten Tomatoes, the film holds an approval rating of 67% based on 6 reviews, with an average rating of 5.5/10.

=== Awards and nominations ===
- Brussels International Fantastic Film Festival (Best European Film) — nominated
- Santa Barbara International Film Festival (Nueva Vision Award) — nominated

== See also ==
- List of Spanish films of 2017
- Ascension (miniseries)
