= Princesas =

2005 Spanish film

- Promotional movie poster for the film
- English: Princesses
- Directed by: Fernando León de Aranoa
- Written by: Fernando León de Aranoa
- Produced by: Fernando León de Aranoa; Jaume Roures
- Starring: Candela Peña; Micaela Nevárez
- Cinematography: Ramiro Civita
- Edited by: Nacho Ruiz Capillas
- Music by: Alfonso de Vilallonga; Manu Chao
- Production companies: Reposado PC; Mediapro
- Distributed by: Warner Sogefilms
- Release date: 2 September 2005 (Spain)
- Running time: 109 minutes
- Language: Spanish

Princesas (English: Princesses) is a 2005 Spanish drama film directed and written by Fernando León de Aranoa which stars Candela Peña and Micaela Nevárez. Set in the onset of the 21st century in Madrid, the plot concerns the friendship developed between a Spanish prostitute and a Dominican prostitute, Caye and Zulema, respectively.

== Plot ==
Caye goes to Gloria's Hair Salon which she frequents and where she discusses with other customers everything from life to politics during her time off; they are also her friends. They share a dislike of the immigrant prostitutes they observe from the salon, because some of them, including Caye, are also prostitutes and believe the immigrants take clients and income they would otherwise have.

Caye's point of view changes when she meets Zulema, an illegal immigrant prostitute working to send money home to her mother and her son Edward who she left in the Dominican Republic. They develop a bond and support each other with everything, including shopping, fashion tips and hair styles.

Caye takes Zulema to her mother's house for dinner. Caye's phone constantly rings but she refuses to answer, something her mother is confused and bothered about. Zulema volunteers to teach sex education at Caye's sister-in-law's school, enabling her to send a toy truck to her son for his birthday.

Caye meets Manuel, a computer programmer, outside a club. With some persuasion, Caye convinces him to go with her. Over beers at a café, Caye confesses she is a prostitute. Manuel does not believe her and laughs it off and they begin a relationship.

Zulema tells Caye about a man who physically abuses her but has promised her papers to legalize her status in Spain and allow her to bring her family to Spain. Caye is suspicious of the offer and begs Zulema not to go with him. Caye's theory proves true, the man wishes simply to use Zulema and never had any intentions of getting her legal status. Zulema escapes a first meeting with him when Caye comes to help, but is later lured to a hotel room, where the client turns out to be him, and she is beaten and presumably raped. After Zulema has consensual sex with a compassionate "volunteer", she goes to the hospital for a full medical examination, something she had not done for many years. When Zulema sees the test results, she collapses. While her medical status is not stated, it is implied that her condition is fatal and communicable and she arranges to meet with her abuser and has unprotected sex with him in an act of revenge.

While at the hospital with Zulema, Caye receives a call from a client requesting her services for himself and his friends. Caye heads to the cafe where they have arranged to meet. There she runs into Manuel and a group of his co-workers and realizes that it was Manuel and his friends who are requesting her services and thus learns of Manuel's infidelity. Manuel meanwhile realizes that Caye was not joking about her profession. Without saying a word, they both understand the situation and go their separate ways.

Devastated over her health issue, Zulema decides to return to the Dominican Republic. With a heartfelt but bittersweet good-bye, Caye gives Zulema a makeover and an envelope of cash and asks her to "go be happy." That afternoon, while having dinner with her family, Caye announces that Zulema has returned to the Dominican Republic because she was a prostitute and could no longer bear the emotional burden of the profession and distance from her son. The film concludes with Caye's cellphone again incessantly ringing, her mom asking her whether she is going to answer or not and Caye simply retorting, "You answer it, mom!"

== Cast ==
- Candela Peña as Caye.
- Micaela Nevárez as Zulema.
- Mariana Cordero as Pilar.
- Llum Barrera as Gloria.
- Violeta Pérez as Caren.
- Mónica Van Campen as Ángela.
- Flora Álvarez as Rosa.
- María Ballesteros as Blanca.
- Alejandra Lorente as Mamen.
- Luis Callejo as Manuel.

== Release ==
The film was theatrically released in Spain on 2 September 2005. It was released in the United States in August 2006 at the IFC Center in New York City and nationally to many digital cable subscribers via IFC OnDemand.

== Production ==
The film was produced by Reposado Producciones Cinematográficas and Mediapro.

== Soundtrack ==
The film includes "Me Llaman Calle", a song by world music artist Manu Chao, which earned the film a Goya award for Best Original Song. The title translates to 'They Call Me Street', and is also a reference to one of the main characters, Caye, whose name sounds phonetically similar to 'calle' in Spanish. "Cinco Razones", also by Manu Chao, appears at several significant points in the plot development.

== Reception ==
=== Critical response ===
Princesas has an approval rating of 74% on review aggregator website Rotten Tomatoes, based on 31 reviews, and an average rating of 6.5/10. The website's critical consensus states: "What Princesas lacks in unique insight into its subject matter, it more than makes up in its sensitive, empathetic portrayal of women engaged in the world's oldest profession". Metacritic assigned the film a weighted average score of 64 out of 100, based on 13 critics, indicating "generally favorable reviews".

=== Awards and nominations ===
Year	Award	Category	Nominee(s)	Result	Ref.
2006	20th Goya Awards	Best Film		Nominated	
2006	20th Goya Awards	Best Original Screenplay	Fernando León de Aranoa	Nominated	
2006	20th Goya Awards	Best Actress	Candela Peña	Won	
2006	20th Goya Awards	Goya Award for Best New Actress	Micaela Nevárez	Won	
2006	20th Goya Awards	Goya Award for Best New Actor	Luis Callejo	Nominated	
2006	20th Goya Awards	Best Costume Design	Sabine Daigeler	Nominated	
2006	20th Goya Awards	Best Sound	Miguel Rejas, Alfonso Raposo, Polo Aledo	Nominated	
2006	20th Goya Awards	Best Original Song	"Me llaman calle" by Manu Chao	Won	
2006	20th Goya Awards	Best Makeup an Hairstyles	Carlos Hernández, Manolo García	Nominated	
2006	11th Forqué Awards	Best Film		Nominated	
2006	15th Actors and Actresses Union Awards	Best Film Actress in a Leading Role	Candela Peña	Won	
2006	15th Actors and Actresses Union Awards	Best Film Actress in a Minor Role	Mariana Cordero	Nominated	
2006	15th Actors and Actresses Union Awards	Best Film Actress in a Minor Role	Violeta Pérez	Nominated	
2006	15th Actors and Actresses Union Awards	Best Film Actor in a Minor Role	Luis Callejo	Won	
2006	15th Actors and Actresses Union Awards	Best New Actress	Micaela Nevárez	Won	

Sundance Film Festival

- Grand Jury Prize: World Cinema – Dramatic (Fernando León de Aranoa)

== See also ==
- List of Spanish films of 2005
