= Habana Blues =

Havana Blues
- Spanish film poster
- Directed by: Benito Zambrano
- Written by: Benito Zambrano; Ernesto Chao
- Produced by: Camilo Vives
- Starring: Alberto Yoel; Roberto San Martín; Yailene Sierra
- Cinematography: Jean-Claude Larrieu
- Edited by: Fernando Pardo
- Distributed by: Warner Bros. Pictures
- Release date: March 18, 2005
- Running time: 109 minutes
- Countries: Spain; Cuba
- Language: Spanish

Havana Blues (Habana Blues) is a 2005 Spanish-Cuban film directed and co-written by Benito Zambrano which tells the story of two young musicians in Cuba. The film revolves around their music and contains criticism of problems in Cuba such as poverty and electricity outages. It was screened in the Un Certain Regard section at the 2005 Cannes Film Festival.

The two musicians, Ruy and Tito (Yoel and San Martín), whose music is a mix of traditional Cuban music and more modern music such as rap, get a chance at an international breakthrough through a Spanish record company, but they would have to change their Cuba-themed lyrics to cater to an international audience. Ruy considers this a betrayal of his country and his art, whereas Tito recognizes the financial necessity of it. At the same time, Ruy is dealing with the fact that his children and their mother Caridad (Sierra) are leaving for the United States. Art versus commerce, nationalism versus globalism, and communism versus capitalism are some of the themes of the film.

== Cast ==
- Alberto Yoel - Ruy (as Alberto Yoel García)
- Roberto San Martín - Tito
- Yailene Sierra - Caridad
- Mayra Rodríguez - Lucía
- Ernesto Escalona - Carlitos
- Marta Calvó - Marta
- Roger Pera - Lorenzo
- Osvaldo Doimeadiós - Ruber
- Zenia Marabal - Luz María
- Laris Vega - Betty
- Jorge Alí - Nelson (as Jorge Ali Pérez)
- Félix Pérez - René
- Aurora Basnuevo - Estrellita
- Tomás Cao - Álex (as Tomás A. Cao)
- Giordano Serrano - Giordano

== See also ==
- List of Spanish films of 2005
- List of Cuban films
