= Beatriz Carvajal =

Spanish actress (born 1949)

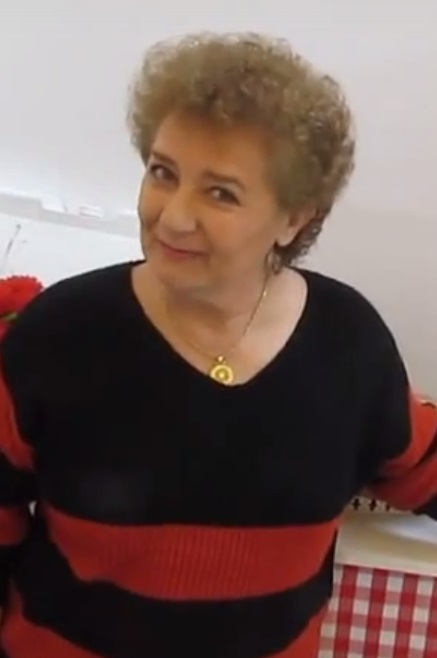
- Beatriz Carvajal in 2013
- Born: Beatriz Pla Navarro; 24 December 1949 (age 76); Madrid, Spain
- Occupation: Actress
- Years active: 1963–present

Beatriz Pla Navarro (born 24 December 1949) better known as Beatriz Carvajal is a Spanish theatre, television and film actress.

== Career ==
She wanted to be an actress since she was a child and she took part in some theatre plays (La zapatera prodigiosa, Mariana Pineda, Los árboles mueren de pie or Cuidado con las personas formales) in the 1960s and 1970s.

Later on, her roles in Televisión Española made her a very popular actress and she has already participated in numerous television series, theatre plays and films.

She is single and has two adoptive daughters, Montse Pla, who worked with her in Compañeros, and Nisma.

== Filmography ==
=== Television ===
- 625 Lineas (1978), by José Antonio Plaza, TVE.
- Lápiz y papel (1981), TVE.
- Un, dos, tres... responda otra vez (1982, 1983, 1985) as La Loli, TVE.
- Querida Concha (1992), with Concha Velasco, Telecinco.
- Lleno, por favor (1993), by Vicente Escrivá, Antena 3.
- ¿Quién da la vez? (1995), by Vicente Escrivá, Antena 3.
- Carmen y familia (1995) by Óscar Ladoire, TVE.
- Más que amigos (1998), as Loli, Telecinco.
- Compañeros (1998–2002), as Marisa Viñé. Antena 3.
- Paco y Veva (2004), TVE.
- Aquí no hay quien viva (2006), as María Jesús, la Torrijas, Antena 3.
- La que se avecina (2007–2010), as Goya, Telecinco.
- Bienvenidos al Lolita (2014) as Dolores Reina.

=== Stage ===
- Los habitantes de la casa deshabitada (1981).
- I do, I do (1982).
- Con ellos llegó la risa (1983).
- El hotelito (1985), by Antonio Gala.
- Lázaro en el laberinto (1985), by Antonio Buero Vallejo.
- Entre tinieblas (1992), by Fermín Cabal.
- Los bosques de Nyx (1994), Festival de Teatro Clásico de Mérida,

=== Film ===
- Brujas (1995), by Álvaro Fernández Armero with Ana Álvarez and Penélope Cruz
- Corazón loco (1997), by Antonio del Real
- Sprint especial (2005), by Juan Carlos Claver
- Ninette (2005), by José Luis Garci

=== Shortfilms ===
- El Síndrome Martins (1999), de Jaime Magdalena
- Velocidad (2000), de Fernando González
- Mi abuelo es un animal (2000), by Mariano Barroso
- Otro tiempo (2001), by Belén Santos

== Awards and nominations ==
Year	Award	Category	Work	Result
1993	Fotogramas de Plata	Best Actress in Television	Lleno, por favor	Nominated
1993	TP de Oro	Best Actress	Lleno, por favor	Nominated
1998	Unión de Actores y Actrices	Best Television Main Actress	Compañeros	Won
1999	Fotogramas de Plata	Best Actress in Theater	Misery	Won
2000	TP de Oro	Best Actress	Compañeros	Nominated
2002	Fotogramas de Plata	Best Actress in Theater	5mujeres.com	Nominated
2005	Círculo de Escritores Cinematográficos Awards	Best Supporting Actress	Ninette	Nominated
