= Luis Callejo =

Spanish actor

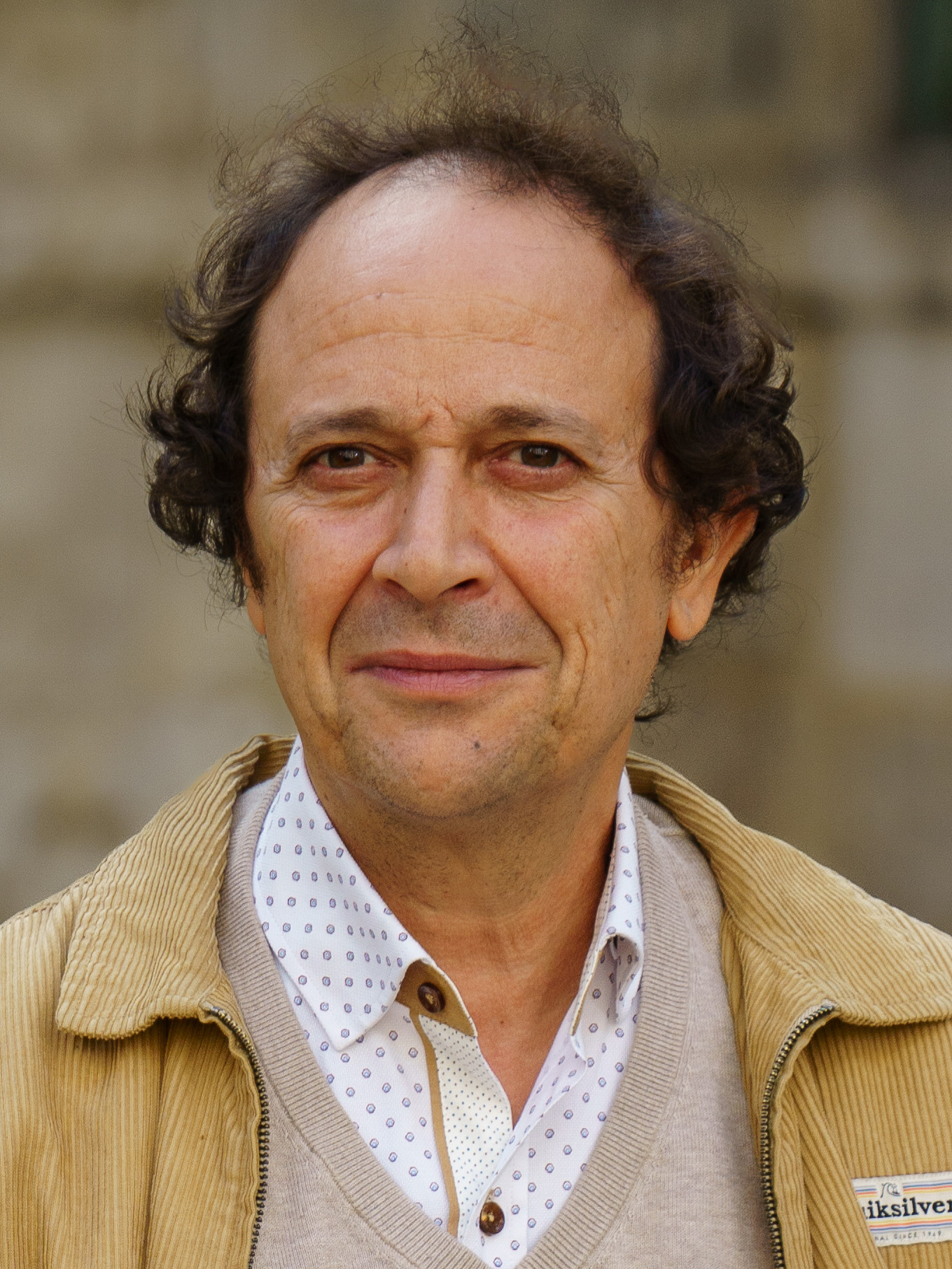
- Callejo in 2025
- Born: Luis Callejo Martínez; 1 August 1970 (age 55); Segovia, Spain
- Education: RESAD
- Occupation: Actor
- Years active: 1998–present

Luis Callejo Martínez (born 1 August 1970) is a Spanish actor.

== Biography ==
Luis Callejo Martínez was born in Segovia on 1 August 1970. He trained his acting chops at the local Municipal Theatre Workshop, later joining the Madrid's RESAD. Callejo made his feature film debut in Luna's Game (2001).

His performance in the 2005 film Princesses earned him a nomination to the Goya Award for Best New Actor.

In 2016, he won a Sant Jordi Awards for The Fury of a Patient Man.

== Selected filmography ==
Year	Title	Role	Notes	Ref.
2005	The Longest Penalty Shot in the World	Khaled		
2005	Princesas	Manuel		
2009	Road to Santiago	Arturo		
2010	For the Good of Others	Carlos		
2011	The Opposite of Love	Fidel		
2015	My Big Night			
2016	Kiki, Love to Love	Antonio		
2016	To Steal from a Thief			
2016	Risen			
2016	The Fury of a Patient Man	Curro		
2016	Smoke & Mirrors	Juan Alberto Belloch		
2017	It's for Your Own Good	Joaquín		
2018	The Warning	Lisandro		
2018	Jefe	César		
2019	While at War	General Mola		
2019	Out in the Open	Overseer		
2020	Valley of the Dead	Sargento		
2021	Below Zero	Ramis		
2021	More the Merrier	Paco		
2021	Once Upon a Time in Euskadi	Jesús		
2022	A Man of Action	Asturiano		
2023	Summer in Red	Carlos		
2024	Checkmates	Lope		
2024	La casa	Antonio		
2024	Myocardium			

== Accolades ==
Year	Award	Category	Work	Result	Ref.
2006	20th Goya Awards	Best New Actor	Princesas	Nominated	
2006	15th Actors and Actresses Union Awards	Best Film Actor in a Minor Role	Princesas	Won	
2012	21st Actors and Actresses Union Awards	Best Television Actor in a Secondary Role	The Boat	Nominated	
2017	31st Goya Awards	Best Actor	The Fury of a Patient Man	Nominated	
2017	26th Actors and Actresses Union Awards	Best Film Actor in a Leading Role	The Fury of a Patient Man	Won	
2017	26th Actors and Actresses Union Awards	Best Film Actor in a Minor Role	To Steal from a Thief	Nominated	
2020	34th Goya Awards	Best Supporting Actor	Out in the Open	Nominated	
2023	31st Actors and Actresses Union Awards	Best Television Actor in a Leading Role	Offworld	Won	
2025	7th Lola Gaos Awards	Best Supporting Actor	La casa	Pending	
