= The Secret Life of Words =

- Theatrical release poster
- Directed by: Isabel Coixet
- Written by: Isabel Coixet
- Produced by: Esther García; Agustín Almodóvar; Jaume Roures
- Starring: Sarah Polley; Tim Robbins; Javier Cámara; Julie Christie
- Narrated by: Sarah Polley
- Cinematography: Jean-Claude Larrieu
- Edited by: Irene Blecua
- Release date: 21 October 2005
- Running time: 115 minutes
- Countries: Spain; Ireland
- Language: English
- Box office: $6,410,058 (INT)

The Secret Life of Words is a 2005 Spanish-Irish drama film written and directed by Isabel Coixet and starring Sarah Polley, Tim Robbins, Javier Cámara and Julie Christie. It was released on 15 December 2006.

== Plot ==
Taciturn, partially deaf Hanna (Polley) is a Yugoslavian native working in a factory in Northern Ireland. She is forced to use annual leave by her boss, who tells her that her co-workers have been offended by her work diligence. After overhearing a conversation about a need for a nurse, she takes on a job as private nurse for burn victim Josef (Robbins). He is bedridden on an offshore oil rig after a fire on the rig, and has severe burns and is temporarily blinded. The rig is not operational awaiting an investigation, and few people remain on board.

Hanna talks very little, and especially does not want to talk about herself. Despite his pain, Josef is constantly making jokes, some of them humorous sexual advances. Hanna's care for him includes holding the urinal and washing his entire body. As they get closer, they start sharing their experiences. Unbeknownst to him, she listens over and over again to a message on his mobile phone from a mysterious woman who was in love with him.

Hanna learns from a colleague that Josef was injured while trying to save a man who committed suicide by jumping into the oil-rig fire. Some other tragic connection between the two men is implied. He tells about a near-drowning experience because he cannot swim. Eventually Josef confides to Hanna his greatest secret guilt, and she tells him about her previous life in the former Yugoslavia. She describes in detail the horrors she endured during the Balkan Wars (Yugoslav Wars), including being kidnapped and repeatedly raped. She shares experiences of the other women, including one who was forced to shoot her own daughter, and the slow and agonizing death of her best friend. She tells of her own repeated torture and lets him feel the scars on her body from the wounds inflicted on her.

Josef is not getting better, and at Hanna's initiative he is air-lifted off the oil rig to be taken to a hospital. When the helicopter lands, Josef wants Hanna to accompany him, but she walks away without a word. However, she leaves behind a backpack (apparently intentionally), and it contains enough information to give Josef a chance to find her. After he recovers, Josef travels to Denmark to visit a counselor who Hanna had seen after fleeing the war, seeking to learn more about her. He then tracks her down at the factory in Northern Ireland where she works. They talk, and at first she keeps her distance, saying she couldn't be with him because she thinks one day she could drown them both in her sorrow. When he tells her that he will "learn to swim," she reciprocates the love. Later, Hanna is shown in a home with the voice of a young girl explaining that Hanna now has two sons, whom the narrator refers to as her brothers, indicating that the woman Hanna described as having been forced to kill her own child was, in fact, herself. The voice of her daughter ends the film with the hope that Hanna will one day be able to live completely in the "now" and no longer be haunted by the past.

== Cast ==
Actor	Role
Sarah Polley	Hanna
Tim Robbins	Josef
Javier Cámara	Simon
Sverre Anker Ousdal	Dimitri
Steven Mackintosh	Doctor Sulitzer
Eddie Marsan	Victor
Julie Christie	Inge
Daniel Mays	Martin
Dean Lennox Kelly	Liam
Danny Cunningham	Scott
Emmanuel Idowu	Abdul
Reg Wilson	Manager

== Release ==
The film uses a song of the same name by Tamaru Yamada in the Japanese version.

== Reception ==
=== Critical response ===
On review aggregator Rotten Tomatoes, the film holds an approval rating of 69% based on 39 reviews, with an average rating of 6.20/10. On Metacritic, the film has a weighted average score of 68 out of 100, based on 11 critics, indicating "generally favorable reviews".

V.A. Musetto of the New York Post compared the film to Breaking the Waves by Lars von Trier, stating that "Coixet's riff stands on its own thanks to thoughtful performances by Polley and Robbins". Jonathan Holland of Variety magazine praised Sarah Polley for her role "as a woman in a state of extreme isolation", adding that "[The Secret Life of] Words looks likely to make itself heard at fests and on the international arthouse circuit".

According to Stephen Holden of The New York Times, the film is as "powerful as anything I can remember feeling in a recent film".

=== Awards and nominations ===
The film was nominated for five Goya Awards and won four of them, including best film of the year:

- Won: Best Director (Isabel Coixet)
- Won: Best Film
- Won: Best Original Screenplay (Isabel Coixet)
- Won: Best Production Supervision (Esther García)
- Nominated: Best Supporting Actor (Javier Cámara)

Polley was nominated as Best European Actress by the European Film Academy for her performance in this film.

== See also ==
- List of Spanish films of 2005
- Inge Genefke
- The International Rehabilitation Council for Torture Victims
