= Other Days Will Come =

- Theatrical release poster
- Spanish: Otros días vendrán
- Directed by: Eduard Cortés
- Screenplay by: Eduard Cortés; Piti Español
- Produced by: Enrique Cerezo; Pedro Costa
- Starring: Cecilia Roth; Antonio Resines; Fernando Guillén; Nadia de Santiago; Nacho Aldeguer; Álex Angulo
- Cinematography: José Luis Alcaine
- Edited by: Anastasi Rinos
- Music by: Xavier Capellas
- Production companies: Enrique Cerezo PC; Didac Films
- Distributed by: Alta Films
- Release date: 7 October 2005
- Country: Spain
- Language: Spanish

Other Days Will Come (Spanish: Otros días vendrán) is a 2005 Spanish drama film directed by Eduard Cortés which stars Cecilia Roth and Antonio Resines.

== Plot ==
The plot follows the developments in the life of Alicia, a high-school teacher at a low ebb who begins a series of pornographic online chats with 17-year old Zak.

== Cast ==
- Cecilia Roth as Alicia
- Antonio Resines as Luis
- Fernando Guillén as Lucas
- Álex Angulo as Miguel
- Nacho Aldeguer as Javi / Zak
- Nadia de Santiago as Vega
- Georgina Latre as Susi
- Reyes Calzado as Ana

== Production ==
The film is an Enrique Cerezo PC and Didac Films production.

== Release ==
Distributed by Alta Films, the film was released theatrically in Spain on 7 October 2005.

== Reception ==
Jonathan Holland of Variety deemed the film to be "a too-rare example in Spanish cinema of an elegant, unshowy drama that's entertaining, thought-provoking, and emotionally satisfying".

Mirito Torreiro of Fotogramas rated the film 3 out of 5 stars, pointing out that some writing overreaching notwithstanding, the depth of the drama is strong enough to overcome these contingencies.

== Accolades ==
Year	Award	Category	Nominee(s)	Result	Ref.
2006	20th Goya Awards	Best Original Screenplay	Eduard Cortés	Nominated	
2006	20th Goya Awards	Best Supporting Actor	Fernando Guillén	Nominated	
2006	20th Goya Awards	Best Cinematography	José Luis Alcaine	Nominated	

== See also ==
- List of Spanish films of 2005
