= Verónica Sánchez =

Spanish actress

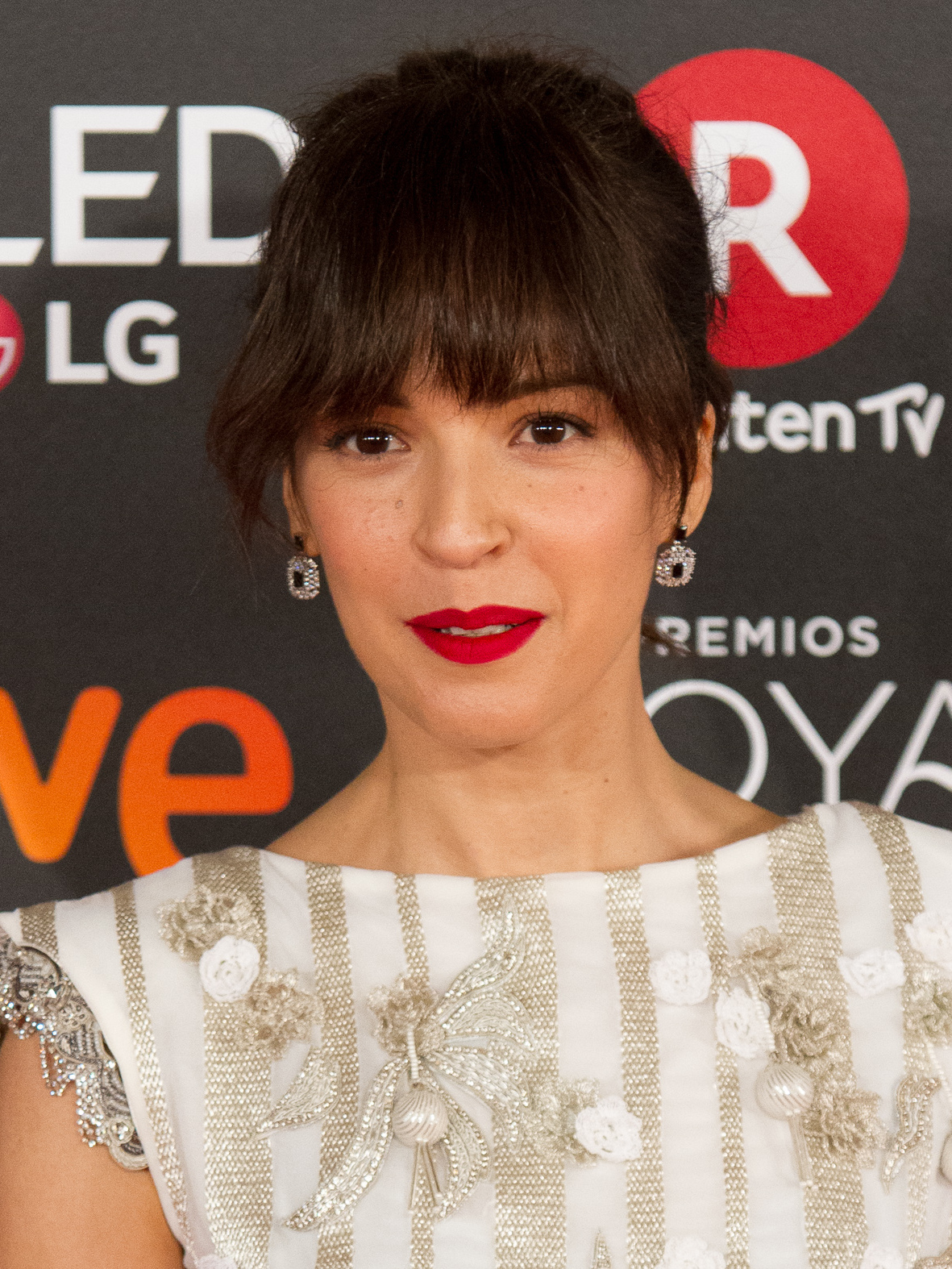
- Sánchez in 2018
- Born: Verónica Sánchez Calderón; 1 July 1977 (age 49); Seville, Spain
- Occupation: Actress
- Years active: 1996–present

Verónica Sánchez Calderón (born 1 July 1977) is a Spanish actress. She made her debut in theatre in 1996, and came to media attention as Eva Capdevila in the Telecinco series Los Serrano in 2003. Sánchez has since developed a successful film career.

== Early life ==
Sánchez was born on 1 July 1977 in Seville. After taking the COU, she moved to Madrid to train in drama.

== Career ==
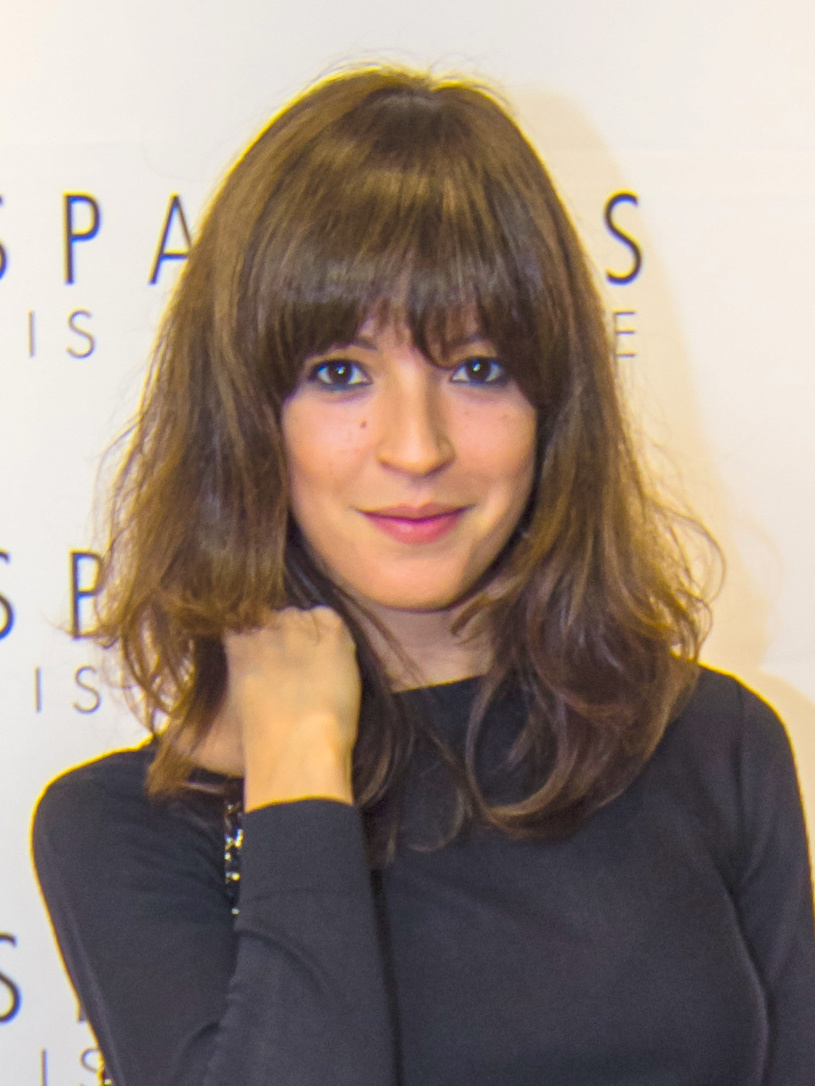
Sánchez in 2016

Sánchez made her stage debut in 1996. One of her most successful theater shows was Blood Wedding in 2002.

In 2003, after her feature film debut in Fernando Colomo's South from Granada, Sánchez landed the role of Eva Capdevila in the television series Los Serrano. Eva's incestuous relationship with her stepbrother Marcos (Fran Perea) earned Sánchez great popularity in Spain. She left Los Serrano in 2006. Sánchez starred in the first season of the television series Génesis: en la mente del asesino, not returning for the second season.

She performed in films such sa Camarón, El Calentito, Mia Sarah, Los 2 lados de la cama, 13 Roses and Zenitram.

== Filmography ==
Film

Year	Title	Role	Notes	Ref.
2003	Al sur de Granada (South from Granada)	Juliana		
2004	Mirados	Verónica		
2004	El año de la garrapata	Ana		
2005	El Calentito	Sara		
2005	Camarón (Camarón: When Flamenco Became Legend)	La Chispa		
2005	Los 2 lados de la cama (The 2 Sides of the Bed)	Marta		
2006	Mia Sarah	Marina		
2007	Las 13 rosas (13 Roses)	Julia		
2007	Zenitarm	Laura Arroyo		
2009	Gordos (Fat People)	Paula		
2009	La moneda	Guille's mother		
2011	La lección de pintura	Elvira		
2012	La montaña rusa	Ada		

Television

Year	Title	Role	Notes	Ref.
2003–06	Los Serrano	Eva Capdevila
2006	Génesis: en la mente del asesino	Lola Casado
2011–19	14 de abril. La República	Alejandra Prado
2013	Gran Reserva. El origen	Sofía
2014–15	Sin identidad	Amparo Duque
2016	El Caso. Crónica de sucesos	Clara López-Dóriga
2017	En tiempos de guerra (Morocco: Love in Times of War)	Pilar Muñiz de Solaruce
2019–20	El embarcadero	Alejandra
2021–23	Sky Rojo	Coral
2025	La Favorita 1922	Elena de Valmonte

== Theatre roles ==
- Un espíritu burlón de Noel Coward (1996)
- Tierra (1997)
- Lorca e Escena (1998)
- El Zapatito Mágico (1999)
- Fin (1999)
- Don Juan en los ruedos de Salvador Távora (2001)
- Bodas de sangre (2002)

== Awards and nominations ==
Year	Award	Category	Work	Result	Ref.
2004	18th Goya Awards	Best New Actress	Al sur de Granada	Nominated	
2004	13th Actors and Actresses Union Awards	Best New Actress	Al sur de Granada	Nominated	
2006	20th Goya Awards	Best Supporting Actress	Camarón	Nominated	
2007	Cinema Writers Circle Medals	Best Actress	Mia Sarah	Nominated	
2010	24th Goya Awards	Best Supporting Actress	Gordos	Nominated	
2010	19th Actors and Actresses Union Awards	Best Supporting Actress (film)	Gordos	Won	
2017	4th Feroz Awards	Best Main Actress in a Series	El Caso. Crónica de sucesos	Nominated	
2026	27th Iris Awards	Best Actress	La favorita 1922	Nominated	
