= Álvaro del Amo =

Spanish writer

Álvaro del Amo (born 1942) is a Spanish dramatist, novelist, screenwriter, and music critic.

His work as a playwright is partly unpublished, but in his productions (Geografía, 1985 and Motor, 1988) one can appreciate a translation of the language and the cinematographic aesthetic to the stage.

As a narrator, he begins with Mutis (1980, La Gaya Ciencia). Other works of his are Libreto (1985), Contagio (1991), El Horror (finalist for the Herralde Prize in 1993), Incandescencia (collection of short stories, 1998) and Los melómanos (2000). He was also the scriptwriter of Amantes, by Vicente Aranda, a play that he brought to the stage in 2014 at the Valle-Inclán theatre in Madrid.

== Sources ==
- "Álvaro del Amo". Caos Editorial. Archived from the original on December 31, 2003.
