= Ahotsak =

Ahotsak (Voices) is a women's platform for peace in the Basque Country created in March 2006 following the announcement of the ETA ceasefire, with the aim of delegitimizing violence and demanding dialogue and the development of political projects by exclusively peaceful and democratic means.

== Impellers ==
It was promoted by a group of women parliamentarians and politicians including Gemma Zabaleta (PSE), Jone Goirizelaia (Batasuna), Kontxi Bilbao (EB), Ainhoa Aznárez (PSN), Nekane Alzelai (EA), Elixabete Piñol (PNV), Gemma González de Txabarri (PNV) and Itzíar Gómez (Aralar).

During 2006, the platform held different events with the aim of bringing together women of different ideologies and sensitivities from Euskadi, Navarre and the French Basque Country and met with groups from the Basque feminist movement and political women's groups from other Spanish autonomous communities. In May 2006, the Plataforma Dones Catalanes per Ahotsak (Catalan Women for Ahotsak Platform), made up of 300 women, including jurist Gemma Calvet and politicians such as Lourdes Muñoz (PSC), Imma Mayol (ICV), Carme Porta (ERC), Mercè Pigem (CiU), was presented in Catalonia to support the Basque women's initiative.

== Philosophy and Manifesto ==
The collective's philosophy was embodied in a document signed by more than 5,000 women presented at a public ceremony at the Palacio Euskalduna in Bilbao on 2 December 2006 in which, in addition to accepting the political nature of the conflict, they demanded the participation of women in its resolution, insofar as they also form part of the conflict and proclaimed the need for a political and democratic solution, as well as the right of Basque citizens to decide.

They acknowledged that the process open in Euskadi was not going through its best moment, they advocated looking for meeting points, recognizing in the other the part of truth that assists them and assuming the gender perspective as an unavoidable premise. Women constitute half of the whole community, therefore, we must also be half of the solution, pointed out the document that called for an active role, full and equal with men, as the only way to lay the foundations of a lasting peace and contribute to the creation of a more just, more democratic and more egalitarian society.

Ahotsak presented its proposal as the one that had so far achieved the greatest political, trade union, social and territorial consensus. However, they did not have the support of PP or UPN members.

The position of the socialist women members of the platform within their own formations was not easy, despite the fact that they supported the peace process initiated by the then president of the government, José Luís Rodríguez Zapatero. Sectors of their party criticized them for "appearing accompanied by prominent figures from the world of Batasuna" and showing themselves to be in favor of a dialogued solution to the Basque conflict.
