= The Method (2005 film) =

2005 film by Marcelo Piñeyro

- Film poster
- Directed by: Marcelo Piñeyro
- Screenplay by: Mateo Gil; Marcelo Piñeyro
- Based on: El mètode Grönholm by Jordi Galceran
- Produced by: Gerardo Herrero; Francisco Ramos
- Starring: Eduardo Noriega; Najwa Nimri; Eduard Fernández; Pablo Echarri; Ernesto Alterio; Natalia Verbeke; Adriana Ozores; Carmelo Gómez
- Cinematography: Alfredo Mayo
- Edited by: Iván Aledo
- Distributed by: On Pictures (Spain)
- Release dates: 14 September 2005 (TIFF); 23 September 2005 (Spain); 16 March 2006 (Argentina)
- Running time: 115 minutes
- Countries: Argentina; Spain; Italy
- Languages: Spanish; English; French

The Method (Spanish: El método) is a 2005 thriller film directed by Marcelo Piñeyro and based on the 2003 play El mètode Grönholm by Jordi Galceran.

It stars Eduardo Noriega, Najwa Nimri, Eduard Fernández, Pablo Echarri, Ernesto Alterio, Natalia Verbeke, Adriana Ozores and Carmelo Gómez, as the only eight actors in the film.

== Synopsis ==
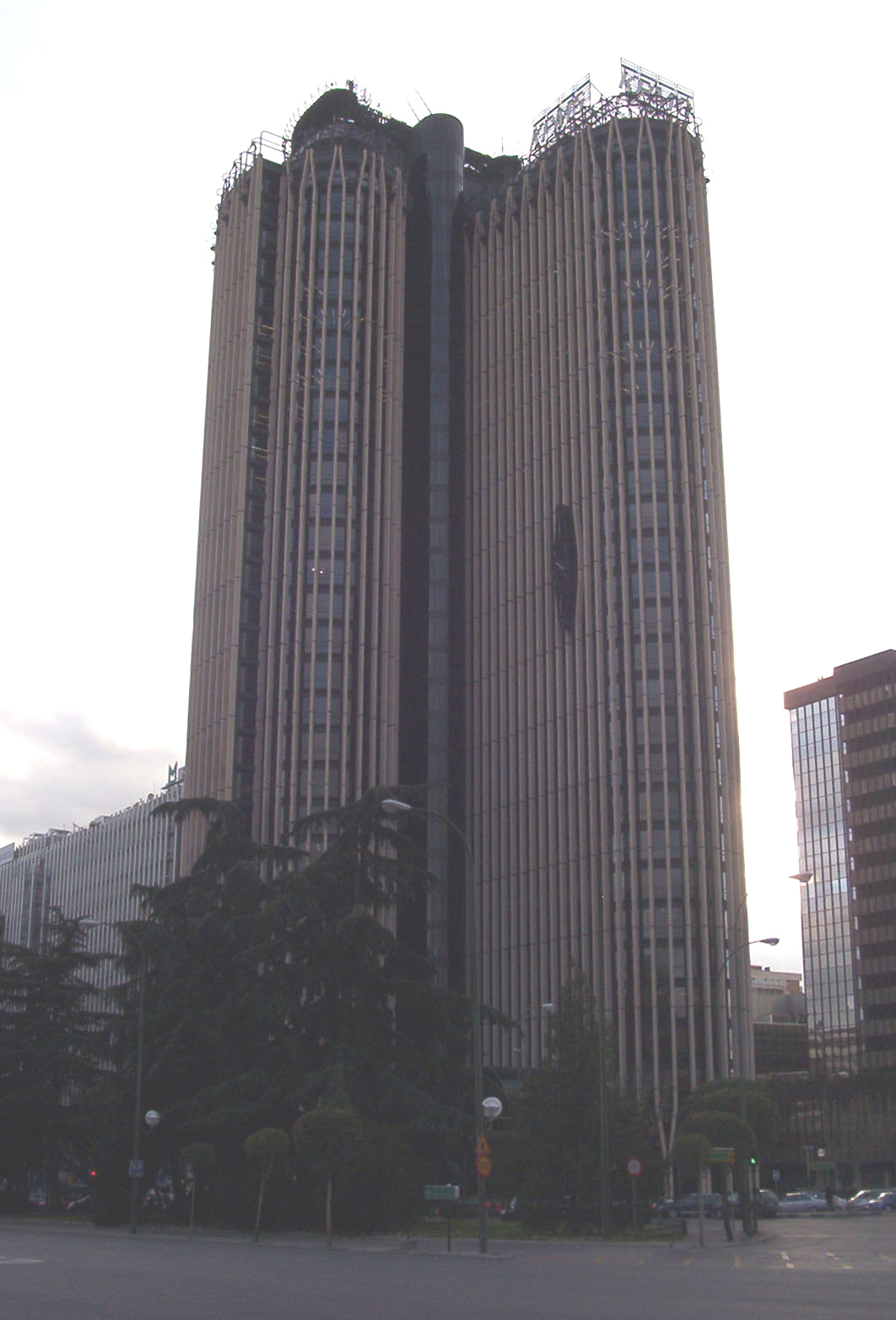
Torre Europa serves as the location of the Dekia offices.

After an introduction showing the AZCA area of Madrid during a meeting of the International Monetary Fund and the World Bank with accompanying anti-globalization protests, the entire film happens within a corporate building (outdoor scenes shot by Torre Europa), mostly in a closed conference room.

The story tells of seven people that have been selected among several applicants for one final round to determine who will get an enviable, executive position for a mysterious corporation, Dekia. The seven applicants are submitted to a series of psychological tests - known as the "Grönholm Method" - that start eliminating the applicants one by one. It is warned at the beginning that one of the seven people is an employee of the corporation posing as an applicant to evaluate the others. As the applicants are discarded, the race for the position becomes more tense and sinister. The tests reveal the weakness of each of the characters and their attitudes to company work. In the end the "mole" will be revealed and only one of them will get the desired position.

== Cast ==
- Eduardo Noriega as Carlos, a young well prepared executive.
- Najwa Nimri as Nieves, a young well prepared executive.
- Eduard Fernández as Fernando, an older Spanish macho.
- Pablo Echarri as Ricardo, a former Argentine unionist.
- Ernesto Alterio as Enrique, interested in personnel selection methods.
- Natalia Verbeke as Montse, the company secretary.
- Adriana Ozores as Ana, a mature executive.
- Carmelo Gómez as Julio, who valued his ethics over loyalty to the company.

== Release ==
Distributed by On Pictures, the film was released theatrically in Spain on 23 September 2005. Palm Pictures handled U.S. distribution.

== Awards ==
The film was nominated to five Goya Awards (Best Lead Actor (Fernández), Best New Actor (Echarri), Best Editing (Aledo), Best Screenplay (Gil and Piñeyro) and Best Supporting Actor (Gómez), winning in the last two categories. It also won in the Flanders International Film Festival and was nominated for Best Film in the Mar del Plata Film Festival. It also won the main award (The Audience Award) at Vilnius International Film Festival.

== Footnotes ==
Similarities have been noted between this film and the 2009 film Exam.

== Remake ==
In 2023, a Dominican remake of the same name was released, directed by David Maler, with an ensemble cast is made up of Nashla Bogaert, Héctor Aníbal, Georgina Duluc, Pepe Sierra, Yasser Michelén, Roger Wasserman and Dahiana Castro in her film acting debut.

== See also ==
- List of Spanish films of 2005
- List of Argentine films of 2006
