= Emma Vilarasau =

Spanish actress

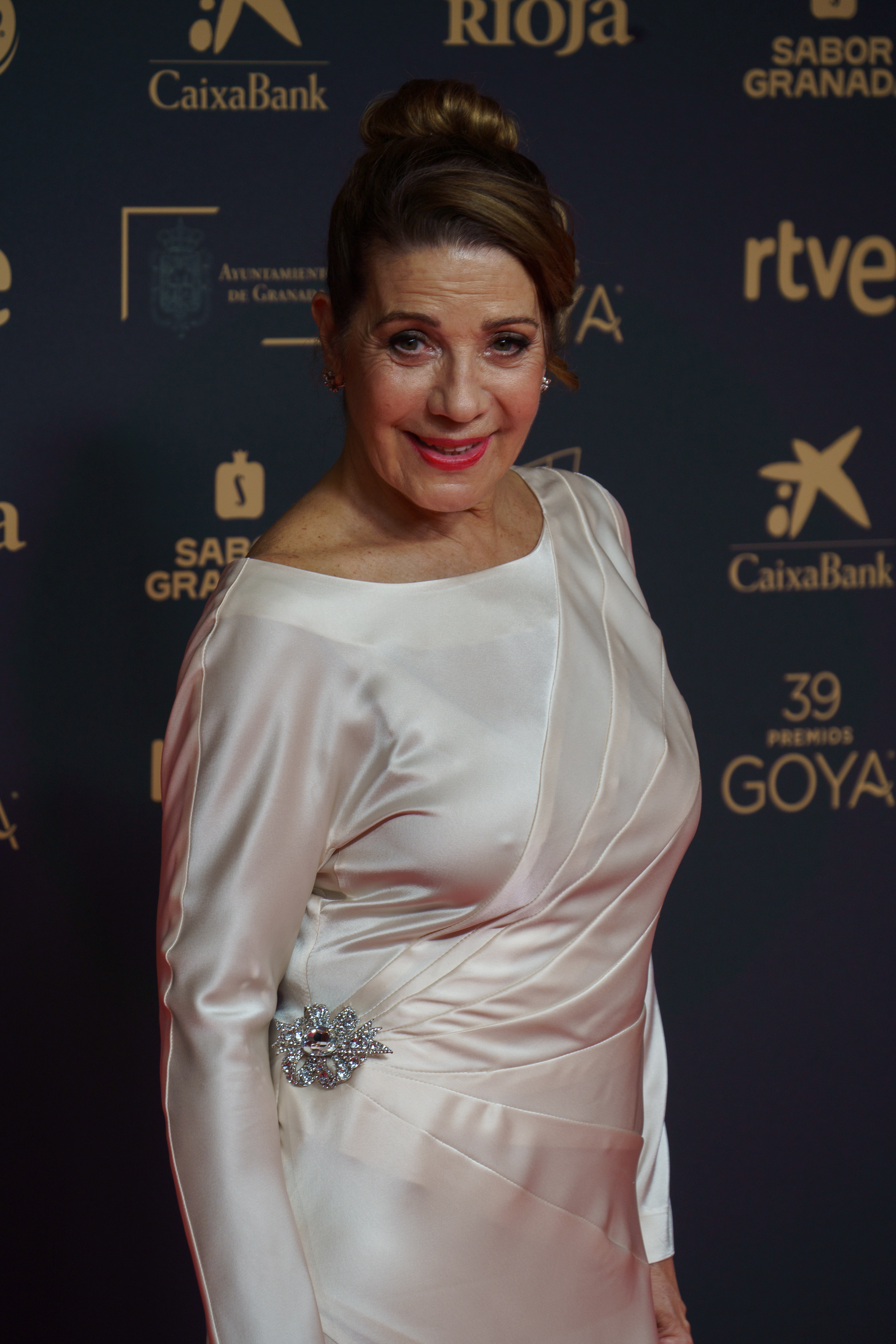
- In 2025
- Born: Emma Vilarasau Tomàs; 6 April 1959 (age 67); Sant Cugat del Vallès, Catalonia, Spain
- Education: Institut del Teatre; École Philippe Gaulier
- Years active: 1980–present
- Spouse: Jordi Bosch
- Children: 2

Emma Vilarasau Tomàs (Catalan pronunciation: [ˈɛmmə βiləɾəˈsaw]; born 6 April 1959) is a Spanish stage, film and television actress from Catalonia. Considered the most critically acclaimed actresses from Catalonia, Vilarasau has won the Gaudí Award, the Premios Max Award, two Butaca Awards, the Feroz Award, and two Goya Award nominations; all major prizes on the Spanish screen and stage.

== Biography ==
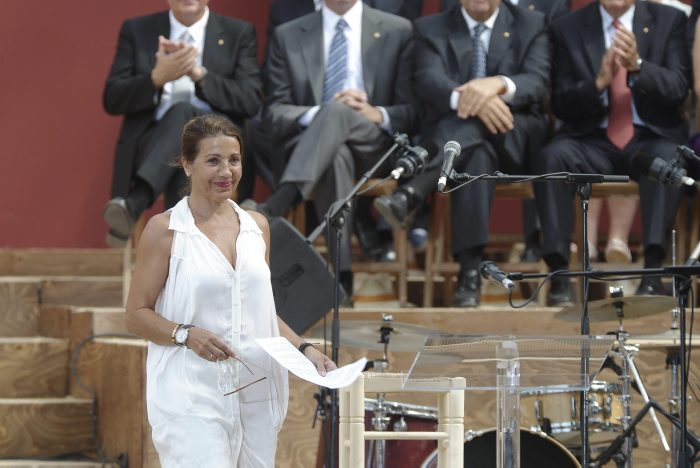
Vilarasau in 2012

Born in Sant Cugat del Vallès, Vilarasau studied at the Institut del Teatre in Barcelona and under Philippe Gaulier at École Philippe Gaulier in Paris. After having worked on many plays she became famous in Catalonia thanks to the character Eulàlia Montsolís whom she played in TV3 television series Nissaga de poder. She has interpreted other TV series characters in series such as Majoria absoluta or Ventdelplà. She has worked on many movies for both television and cinema.

She is married to fellow actor Jordi Bosch with whom she has two sons: Jordi (born in 1991) and Marc (born in 1995).

== Filmography ==
=== Stage ===
- Santa Joana dels Escorxadors, vers 1980
- Mort, Dimoni i Carn, 1982
- L'impromtu a Versalles, 1982
- L'héroe, 1983
- Al vostre gust,1983
- Els Fills del Sol, 1984
- La Flauta Màgica, 1984
- Un dels Últims Vespres de Carnaval, 1985
- La Ronda, 1986
- El 30 d'abril, 1987
- L'última Copa, 1987
- Lorenzaccio, Lorenzaccio, 1987
- La Bona Persona de Sezuan, 1988
- Les Noces de Fígaro, 1989
- Combat entre Negre i Gossos, 1989
- Els gegants de la Muntanya, 1990
- Tàlem, 1990
- Terra Baixa, 1990
- Dansa d'Agost, 1991
- La Infanticida, 1992
- Roberto Zucco, 1993
- El Barret dels Cascavells, 1994
- Busco el Senyor Ferran, 1996
- Paraules Encadenades, 1998
- Lectura de poemes de Miquel Martí i Pol, 1998
- El Criptograma, 1999
- Un Tranvia Anomenat Desig, 2000
- L'habitació del nen, 2003
- Paraules Contra la Guerra, 2003
- Les tres germanes, 2005
- Un matrimoni de Boston, 2005 i 2006
- Carta d'una desconeguda, 2007

=== Television ===
- Quico el progre, 1993
- Secrets de família, 1995
- Nissaga de poder, 1996–98
- Crims, 2000
- Mirall trencat, 2002
- Majoria absoluta, 2002–03
- Ventdelplà, 2005–10

=== Cinema and TV films ===
- Ni tan siquiera tienes ojos azules, 1997 (Short)
- Un caso para dos, 1996
- Dues dones, 1998
- Els sense nom, 1999
- Utopia, 2001
- L'illa de l'holandès, 2001
- Germanes de sang, 2001
- Gossos, 2002
- Las voces de la noche, 2002
- Para que no me olvides, 2005 (Nominated to the Goya Awards 2005 in the category of best actress and winner of the Sant Jordi Award for best Spanish actress)
- Casa en flames, 2024
