= Ninette (film) =

- Film poster
- Directed by: José Luis Garci
- Screenplay by: Álvaro del Amo; Vicente Aranda
- Produced by: José Luis Garci
- Starring: Elsa Pataky; Carlos Hipólito; Enrique Villén; Beatriz Carvajal
- Cinematography: Raúl Pérez Cubero
- Edited by: Miguel González Sinde
- Music by: Pablo Cervantes
- Release date: 12 August 2005; (Spain)
- Running time: 118 minutes
- Country: Spain
- Language: Spanish

Ninette is a 2005 Spanish romantic comedy-drama film directed by José Luis Garci. It is based on the plays Ninette y un señor de Murcia and Ninette, modas de París by Miguel Mihura.

The film had 7 Goya Award nominations and one win.

== Plot ==
Ninette Sánchez is an intelligent, sexy, charming and spontaneous Parisian girl, daughter of Spanish republican exiles, working in the Galeries Lafayette. Her ingenuousness and beauty charm Andrés, a humble Spanish vendor of religious items from Murcia, who is staying with her family after he came to Paris to meet "easy" French women. Andrés falls for her many charms. Unfortunately, Ninette's parents, Pierre and Bernarda, do not take the news well when Ninette announces that she is pregnant.

== Cast ==
- Carlos Hipólito as Andrés
- Elsa Pataky as Alejandra 'Ninette'
- Enrique Villén as Armando
- Beatriz Carvajal as Madame Bernarda
- Fernando Delgado as Monsieur Pierre
- Mar Regueras as Maruja
- Miguel Rellán as Don Roque
- Javivi as Vecino de Ninette / Director del hotel
- Carlos Iglesias as Jugador de mus
- Eduardo Gómez as Jugador de mus
- Jorge Roelas as Jugador de mus
- Luis José Ventin as (billed as Luis Ventín)
- María Elena Flores as Melchora

== DVD release ==
Ninette is available in Region 2 DVD in Spanish with English subtitles.

== Screenings ==
The film was screened in Madrid in 2024 in a retrospective of Garci's work.

== See also ==
- List of Spanish films of 2005
