= Elsa & Fred (2005 film) =

Elsa y Fred
- Film Poster
- Directed by: Marcos Carnevale
- Written by: Marcos Carnevale; Marcela Guerty; Lily Ann Martin
- Produced by: Marcos Carnevale; Carlos Andrada; José Antonio Félez
- Starring: Manuel Alexandre; China Zorrilla; Federico Luppi
- Cinematography: Juan Carlos Gómez
- Edited by: Nacho Ruiz Capillas
- Music by: Lito Vitale
- Release date: 2005
- Running time: 108 minutes
- Countries: Argentina; Spain
- Language: Spanish

Elsa y Fred (Elsa and Fred) is a 2005 Spanish-Argentine film co-production directed by Marcos Carnevale and starring Manuel Alexandre, China Zorrilla and Federico Luppi. An American remake of the film was released in 2014.

== Synopsis ==
Fred, a recently widowed Spaniard in his 70s who has led a quiet life, retires to an apartment in Madrid. Elsa, a similarly aged but more colorful Argentinian and a chronic liar, is his neighbor. Fred has no significant health problems but is a hypochondriac. Elsa is seriously ill and undergoing dialysis but hides it from Fred. The two fall in love. Elsa throws Fred into situations the widower would have disapproved of before he met her, making him "live life and not death". Once Fred learns Elsa will probably die, he pays all their expenses for a trip to Rome to fulfill Elsa's lifelong wish of reenacting Federico Fellini's famous scene starring Marcello Mastroianni and Anita Ekberg under the Fontana di Trevi in La Dolce Vita.

After the trip to Rome, the movie ends with Fred visiting Elsa's grave in Madrid with his grandson. Fred looks at the birthdate on her tombstone and realizes she lied about how old she was and jokingly and affectionately calls her "embustera" (Spanish for "liar").

== English-language remake ==
The film was remade in 2014 as a film set in the United States, starring Shirley MacLaine and Christopher Plummer, also titled Elsa & Fred.

== See also ==
- List of Spanish films of 2005
- List of Argentine films of 2005
