= Óscar Jaenada =

Spanish actor (born 1975)

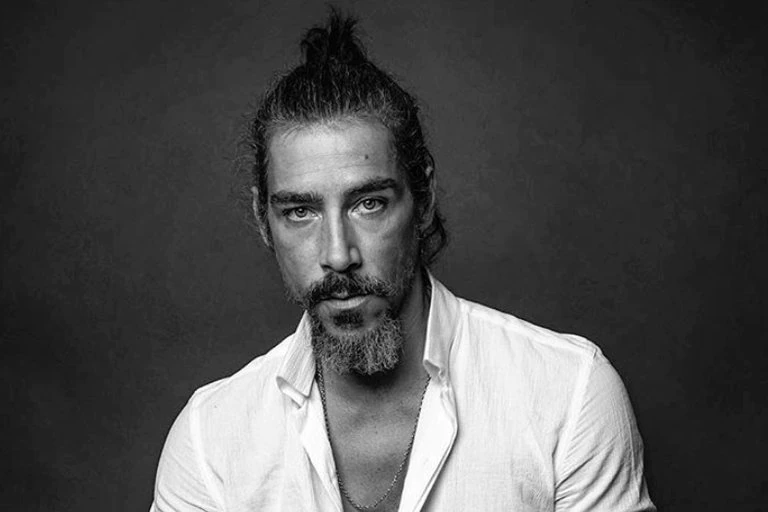
- Jaenada in 2001
- Born: Óscar Jaenada Gajo; 4 May 1975 (age 51); Esplugues de Llobregat, Catalonia, Spain
- Occupation: Actor
- Years active: 1999–present

Óscar Jaenada Gajo (born 4 May 1975) is a Spanish actor. He portrayed Camarón de la Isla in Camarón: When Flamenco Became Legend (2005) and Cantinflas in Cantinflas (2014).

== Career ==
Óscar Jaenada was born on 4 May 1975 in Esplugues de Llobregat, Spain. He began acting at the age of thirteen, performing in Shakespeare plays.

Jaenada moved to Madrid to improve his career prospects. He obtained several television roles, appearing in 7 vidas and Hospital Central, before landing work in feature films. Some of his early roles were in such productions as Lisístrata (2002) and Descongélate (2003). Shortly afterwards, Achero Mañas offered him the leading role in November (2003). Jaenada was a candidate for the Goya Awards in 2004 as best actor for his role in this production but couldn't attend the ceremony as he was in Argentina filming El juego de la verdad. Upon his return to Spain, he was offered several roles in comedies. Among them was the lead in the film XXL (2004). He also landed a permanent role in the series Javier ya no vive solo.

Just as Jaenada was beginning to feel pigeonholed as a comedian, Jaime Chávarri sent him a script for a film about the life of flamenco singer Camarón de la Isla. Camarón premiered at the San Sebastián International Film Festival in 2005. On 15 December 2005, Jaenada was nominated for the Goya Award for Best Actor in the film. Nine days later, he was nominated for the Silver Frames prize and the Circle of Cinematographic Writers medal. At the beginning of 2006, Jaenada won all three honours. Also in 2006, Jaenada served as master of ceremonies with Candela Peña at the inaugural gala of the Málaga Film Festival. A week later, he obtained a nomination at the Spanish Actors Union for his work with Chávarri.

In 2011, Jaenada obtained a role in Pirates of the Caribbean: On Stranger Tides, where he played "the Spaniard", King Ferdinand's most trusted agent and an officer of the Spanish Royal Navy. He returned to the pirate theme in 2011 for the Telecinco series Piratas. In 2015, he confessed that his career in Spanish cinema "was not on the right track", and that the bulk of offers he received came from the Americas.

== Personal life ==
Jaenada has a son with actress Barbara Goenaga, with whom he was romantically linked from 2000 until 2012.

In April 2017, he was sentenced to six months in prison for falsifying the official title of recreational boat skipper in a nautical school. Jaenada admitted to the charges and reached an agreement to have the penalty commuted to a €3,600 fine.

== Selected filmography ==
=== Film ===
List of film appearances, with year, title, and role shown
Year	Title	Role	Notes	Ref.
2000	Aunque tú no lo sepas		Feature film debut	
2003	Lisístrata			
2003	Descongélate!	Aitor		
2003	Noviembre	Alfredo		
2004	El juego de la verdad	Alberto		
2005	Camarón: la película	Camarón de la Isla		
2008	Todos estamos invitados	Josu Jon		
2008	Che	David "Dario" Ardiazola		
2010	La herencia Valdemar	Nicolás Trémel		
2010	The Losers	Cougar		
2010	La herencia Valdemar II: La sombra prohibida	Nicolás Trémel		
2011	Pirates of the Caribbean: On Stranger Tides	The Spaniard		
2012	¡Atraco!	Ramos		
2012	The Cold Light of Day	Dueño de Fabrik		
2014	Cantinflas	Mario Moreno "Cantinflas"		
2015	After Words	Óscar Jaenada	Juan	
2016	The Shallows	Carlos		
2016	Hands of Stone	Chaflán		
2017	Oro	Juan de Gorriamendi		
2017	Loving Pablo	Santoro		
2017	Snatched	Hector Morgado		
2018	The Man Who Killed Don Quixote	Blair		
2019	Rambo: Last Blood	Víctor Martínez		
2021	Chaos Walking	Wilf		
2021	Xtremo	Lucero		
2024	The Platform 2	Dagin Babi		
TBA	Porto Rico			

=== Television ===
List of television appearances, with year, title, and role shown
Year	Title	Role	Notes	Ref.
2000	Hospital Central			
2003	7 vidas			
2011	Piratas	Álvaro Mondego		
2018–2021	Luis Miguel: The Series	Luisito Rey	14 episodes	
2019	Hernán	Hernán Cortés		
2023	Journey to the Center of the Earth	Pompilio Calderón		
2025	20,000 Leagues Under the Sea	Pompilio Calderón		
2025	The Walking Dead: Daryl Dixon	Federico de Rivera	Main role; 6 episodes	

== Awards and recognition ==
- Goya Awards – Best New Actor for Noviembre (2003)
- Goya Awards – Best Actor for Camarón (2005)
- Silver Frames – Best Actor for Camarón (2005)
- Circle of Cinematographic Writers – Best Actor for Camarón (2005)
- Platino Awards – Best Actor for Cantinflas (2015)
- Ariel Award for Best Actor for Cantinflas (2015)
