= Pilar López de Ayala =

Spanish film actress (born 1978)

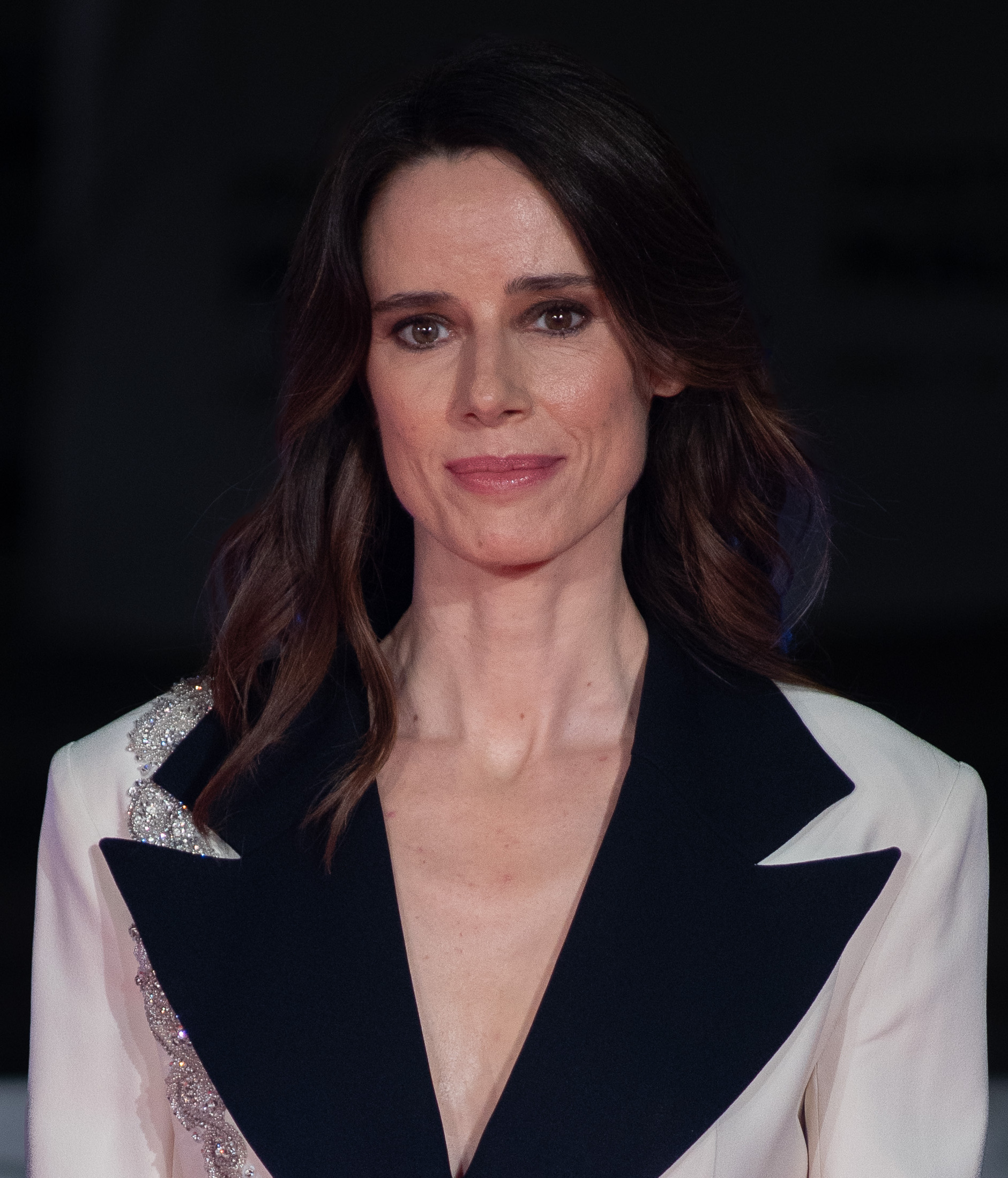
- López de Ayala in 2024
- Born: Pilar López de Ayala Arroyo; 18 September 1978 (age 48); Madrid, Spain
- Occupation: Actress

Pilar López de Ayala Arroyo (born 18 September 1978) is a Spanish actress. She won a Goya Award for Best Actress for her performance playing Joanna of Castile in 2001 film Mad Love.

== Life and career ==
=== Early life ===
Pilar López de Ayala Arroyo was born in Madrid on 18 September 1978. Her parents are Rodrigo López de Ayala Sánchez-Arjona and Pilar Arroyo Gallego. On her father side she descends from the rural nobility of Extremadura and is twice descendant of Christopher Columbus through Diego Colón. She studied at the public school Francisco de Quevedo in Majadahonda.

=== Career beginnings ===
For her film debut as an actress, she appeared in a minor role in the children's film El niño invisible (1995), a promotional vehicle for the musical ensemble Bom Bom Chip. From 1997 to 1999, she portrayed Carlota in 418 episodes of teen daily television series Al salir de clase. Her film career continued with a performance in Gracia Querejeta's By My Side Again (1999). In Fill Me with Life (2000), she delivered her first leading performance in a film, portraying twentysomething María alongside Unax Ugalde in a tragic story about the descent into drugs and prostitution in Madrid. Also by the turn of the century, she appeared in the comedy films Living It Up and Kisses for Everyone. For her performance in the latter film portraying Rocío, an "upper-class mommy's girl and husband-hunter", she earned a nomination for the Goya Award for Best New Actress.

=== Peak and first hiatus ===
She obtained critical acclaim for playing Joanna of Castile in Vicente Aranda's period drama Mad Love. The film, an international co-production with Italy and Portugal, premiered in September 2001 at the 49th San Sebastián International Film Festival, with López Ayala being awarded the Silver Shell for Best Actress. It also was a box office success in Spain. López de Ayala went on to win the Goya Award for Best Actress and an Actors Union Award for Best Leading Performance in Film.

Despite the success she had massed with Mad Love, López de Ayala did not meaningfully work in the Spanish film industry from 2001 to 2005. She did however play a role in the English-language in The Bridge of San Luis Rey (2004), a co-production with France and the United Kingdom.

== Filmography ==
=== Film ===
Year	Title	Role	Notes	Ref
1995	El niño invisible			
1999	Cuando vuelvas a mi lado (By My Side Again)			
2000	Báilame el agua (Fill Me with Life)	María		
2000	La gran vida (Living It Up)			
2000	Besos para todos (Kisses for Everyone)	Rocío		
2001	Juana la Loca (Mad Love)	Juana		
2004	The Bridge of San Luis Rey	La Perichole		
2005	Obaba	Maestra		
2006	Bienvenido a casa (Welcome Home)	Eva		
2006	Alatriste	Mujer de Malatesta		
2007	En la ciudad de Sylvia (In the City of Sylvia)	Ella		
2007	Las 13 rosas (13 Roses)	Blanca Brisac		
2008	Comme les autres (Baby Love)	Fina		
2008	Sólo quiero caminar (Just Walking)	Paloma		
2010	O Estranho Caso de Angélica (The Strange Case of Angelica)	Angélica		
2010	Lope (Lope: The Outlaw)	Elena Osorio		
2011	Buenas noches España			
2011	Intruders	Luisa		
2011	Medianeras (Sidewalls)	Mariana		
2014	Night Has Settled	Luna		
2016	Rumbos (Night Tales)	Lucía		
2017	Agadah			
2024	Dans la chambre du sultan (Close to the Sultan)	Jeanne		

== Accolades ==
Year	Award	Category	Work	Result	Ref.
2001	15th Goya Awards	Best New Actress	Kisses for Everyone	Nominated	
2001	10th Actors Union Awards	Best Newcomer	Kisses for Everyone	Nominated	
2001	45th Sant Jordi Awards	Best Spanish Actress	Fill Me with Life	Won	
2001	San Sebastián International Film Festival	Silver Shell for Best Actress	Mad Love	Won	
2002	16th Goya Awards	Best Actress	Mad Love	Won	
2006	20th Goya Awards	Best Supporting Actress	Obaba	Nominated	
2011	25th Goya Awards	Best Supporting Actress	Lope: The Outlaw	Nominated	
2012	17th Forqué Awards	Best Actress	Sidewalls	Nominated	
2012	26th Goya Awards	Best Supporting Actress	Intruders	Nominated	
