= Micaela Nevárez =

Puerto Rican actress

- Born: January 1, 1972 (age 54); Carolina, Puerto Rico
- Occupation: actress
- Years active: 2005-present

Micaela Nevárez (born January 1, 1972) is a Puerto Rican actress known for her roles in independent and European films. Her debut was in the Spanish film Princesas, directed by directed by Fernando León de Aranoa. In the film, she portrayed Zulema, an illegal immigrant from the Dominican Republic trying to make a living as a prostitute on the streets of Madrid, Spain. Nevárez's compelling performance in this film earned her the Goya Award for Best New Actress in 2006, a historic achievement as the first Puerto Rican actress to win this notable award.

== Biography ==
Born in Carolina, Puerto Rico, Nevárez received her education in local military schools in order to improve her English. At the age of 10, her parents decided to relocate to New York City, where she focused on preparing for a medical career. Despite this, she continued to nurture her passion for the arts as a hobby. It was her stepfather who played a pivotal role in encouraging her to pursue her dreams of becoming an actress.

Fate stepped in when director Fernando León de Aranoa discovered Nevárez while promoting his latest film "Lunes al Sol" in New York. Nevárez, a regular at the popular bar/restaurant "Oliva" in lower Manhattan during their salsa music nights, caught the director's eye, leading him to invite her to audition for a role in his upcoming film. Initially hesitant due to her stepfather's recent passing, she declined the offer and recommended a friend for the role. However, after the director arranged for acclaimed Spanish actor Javier Bardem, whom Nevárez greatly admired, to personally deliver the script to her, she accepted the offer. Following some initial discussion, she traveled to Spain for screen tests.

On January 29, 2006, in the presence of thousands of Spain's top artists and directors, Nevárez beat four other actresses in being named Best New Actress at the 20th Goya Awards held in Madrid's Palacio Municipal de Congresos. Her win not only marked a significant milestone for her but also made her the first Puerto Rican performer to achieve this prestigious film honor, joining the ranks of a select few Latin American actresses who have done so.

In her native Puerto Rico, she was granted an audience with Governor Aníbal Acevedo Vilá at La Fortaleza, who congratulated her on her win.

By 2008, Nevárez was residing in London with her French husband. She kickstarted her film career in the United States with a supporting role in the independent film The War Boys, based on a play by Naomi Wallace. In the 2009 film, she portrayed Marta, the love interest of Victor Rasuk's character.
