= Enrique Villén =

Spanish actor

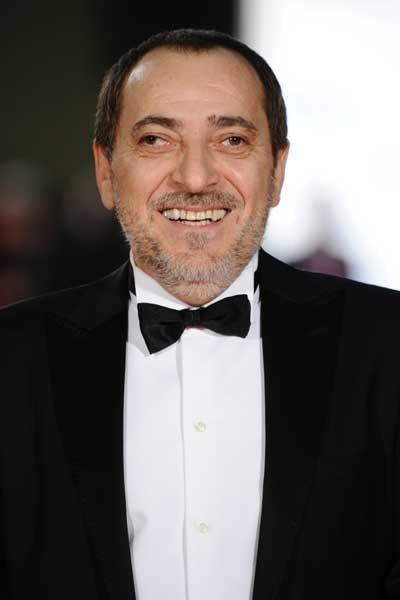
- Born: Enrique Villén Cruz; 1 May 1960 (age 66); Madrid, Spain
- Occupation: Actor
- Years active: 1990–present

Enrique Villén Cruz (born 1 May 1960) is a Spanish actor, best known for his supporting performances in films directed by Álex de la Iglesia. He was nominated for the 2005 Goya Award for Best Supporting Actor for his performance in Ninette.

== Biography ==
Enrique Villén Cruz was born on 1 May 1960 in Madrid. He worked as a comedian already at age 16. He made his film debut at age 28.

== Selected filmography ==
Year	Title	Role	Notes	Ref.
1995	The Day of the Beast	Encargado Seguridad		
1999	La mujer más fea del mundo (The Ugliest Woman in the World)	Abella		
2000	La comunidad	Domínguez		
2002	Mondays in the Sun	Reina		
2002	The Biggest Robbery Never Told	Vicente		
2004	Crimen Ferpecto	Comisario Campoy		
2005	Ninette	Armando		
2005	Torrente 3: El protector	Salas		
2005	The Longest Penalty Shot in the World	Adrián		
2005	Princesas	Dueño del bar		
2006	Los managers	Maca		
2007	Sunday Light	Longinos		
2008	Sangre de Mayo	Paco 'El Chispas'		
2010	The Last Circus	Andrés		
2011	Torrente 4: Lethal Crisis	Ramírez		
2012	Holmes & Watson. Madrid Days	Enrique Valcárcel		
2013	Witching & Bitching	El Inadaptado Social		
2013	Para Elisa	Comisario		
2014	Mortadelo and Filemon: Mission Implausible	Profesor Bacterio (voice)		
2015	My Big Night	Soriano		
2019	La pequeña Suiza	Revuelta		
2024	The Silence of Marcos Tremmer	Señor Museo		
