= Álex González (actor) =

Spanish actor

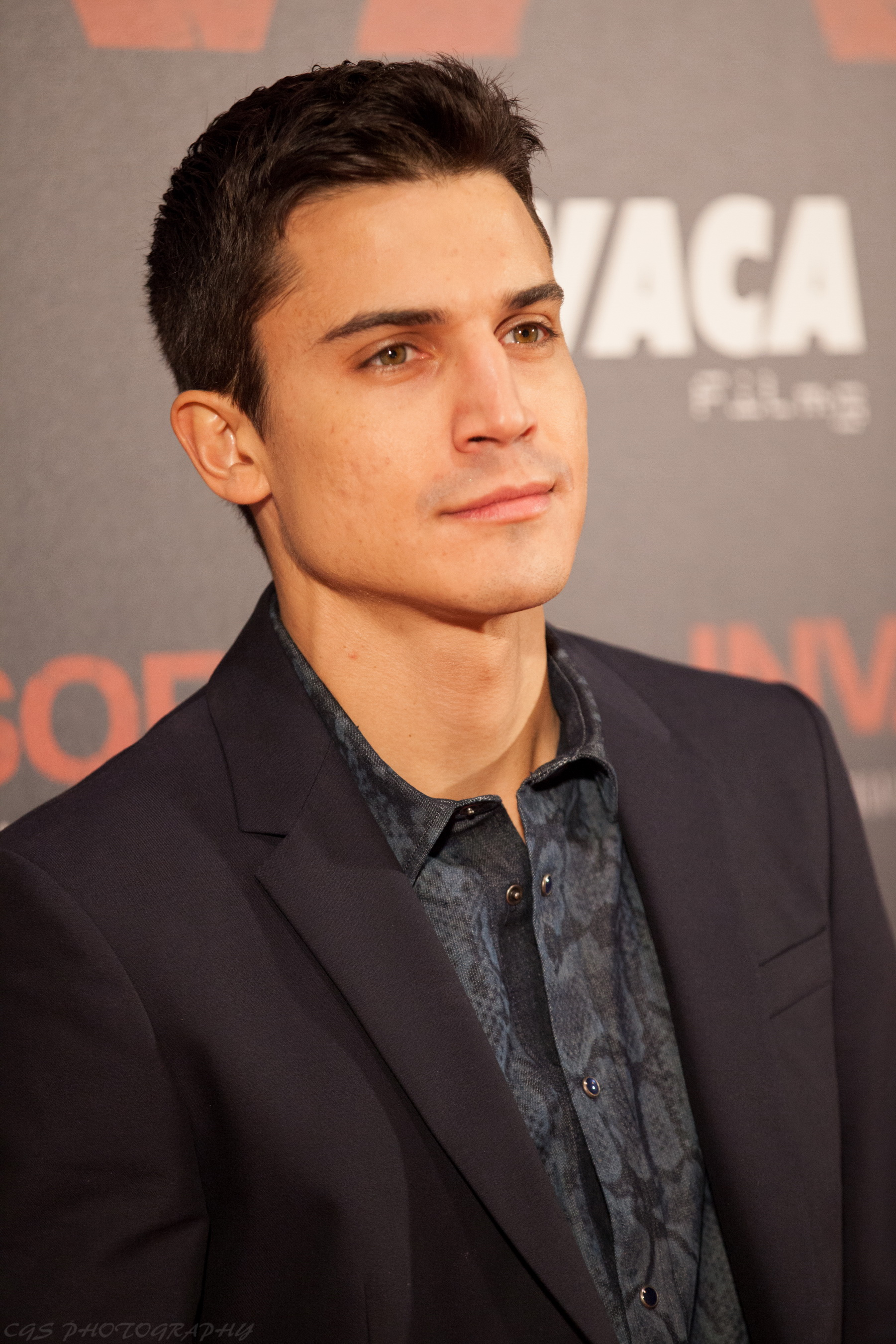
- Born: Augusto Alejandro José González; 13 August 1980 (age 45); Madrid, Spain
- Occupations: Actor; singer

Augusto Alejandro José González (born 13 August 1980), known professionally as Álex González, is a Spanish actor.

== Biography ==
González was born on 13 August 1980 in Madrid. After he starred in short films and played a minor role in Hospital Central, his TV career took off with Un paso adelante, where he played the role of UFO. He landed his feature film acting debut with a role in Round Two (2005), which earned him a nomination to the Goya Award for Best New Actor.

== Filmography ==
=== Television ===
Year	Title	Role	Notes	Ref.
2004	Un paso adelante	UFO		
2005	Motivos personales	Nacho Mendoza		
2007	Cuenta atrás	Mario Arteta		
2008	LEX	Raúl Sierra		
2009–2010	La Señora	Antón Portela		
2013–2014	Tierra de lobos	Don Joaquín		
2014–2016	El Príncipe	Javier Morei		
2018–2020	Vivir sin permiso (Unauthorized Living)	Mario Mendoza		
2021	3 caminos	Roberto		
2021	Toy Boy	Leonardo Giallo "El Turco"		

=== Film ===
Year	Title	Role	Notes	Ref.
2005	Segundo asalto (Round Two)	Ángel	Nomination to 2006 Goya Award for Best New Actor	
2006	Una rosa de Francia	Andrés		
2011	X-Men: First Class	Janos Quested / Riptide		
2012	Alacrán enamorado (Scorpion in Love)	Julián		
2017	Órbita 9 (Orbiter 9)	Álex		
2021	Fuimos canciones (Sounds Like Love)	Leo		
2025	La sospecha de Sofía (Sofia's Suspicion)	Daniel / Klaus		

=== Music videos ===
Year	Artist	Song	Ref.
2008	El Canto del Loco	"La Suerte de Mi Vida"	
