= University of the Philippines Film Institute =

Film school in Quezon City, Philippines

- Motto: At the forefront of Filipino film education, practice, and scholarship
- Type: Public film school
- Established: 2003; 23 years ago
- Parent institution: College of Media and Communication; University of the Philippines Diliman
- Affiliations: International Association of Film and Television Schools
- Director: Jason "Yason" B. Banal
- Location: Quezon City, Philippines; 14°39′24″N 121°04′01″E
- Campus: Urban
- Website: filminstitute.upd.edu.ph

- Location in Metro Manila Location in Luzon Location in the Philippines

The University of the Philippines Film Institute, also known as the UP Film Institute or UPFI, is a film school located in Quezon City, Philippines. It is attached to the UP College of Media and Communication and engages in theater and extension services, academics, and research related to cinema. The UPFI offers degree programs in the bachelor's and master's level.

Officially established in March 2003 through a resolution by the UP Board of Regents, the UPFI formally unifies two previously separate constituents of the University of the Philippines Diliman: the UP Film Center and the Department of Film and Audio-Visual Communication of the College of Media and Communication. It primarily operates within two venues: the UPFI Media Center where majority of film classes are held, and the UPFI Film Center where exhibitions and theatrical screenings are mainly shown. To date, the UP Film Institute is the only academic institution in the Philippines that is a member of the International Association of Film and Television Schools.

== History ==
The origins of the UPFI can be traced back to the UP Film Society, a precursor to the academic entity known as the UP Film Center (UPFC). (Note: Not to be confused with the Faculty Center (FC or also UPFC), a different building located in the University of the Philippines Diliman campus that was destroyed by fire and is currently undergoing reconstruction.) When the UP Film Society developed into the UPFC and became a distinct university unit in 1976 under the UP President's Council on the Arts, (Note: Also known as the Prescounarts, the President's Council on the Arts was in charge of the university's "formulation and execution of a cultural program in depth." In 1982, it was abolished in lieu of the creation of the singular President's Committee on Culture and the Arts (PCCA).) the late poet and playwright Virginia R. Moreno became its founding director (Note: Professor Virginia R. Moreno was also the presiding chairperson of the President's Council on the Arts at the time, her designation having been effective only a year earlier. Prior December 3, 1975, Moreno served as Vice Chairperson.) and the UPFC assumed the role of giving "instruction, research, and community extension work in film as art." On January 1, 1983, the UPFC was officially attached to the UP Institute of Mass Communication (renamed into College of Mass Communication in 1988, then College of Media and Communication in 2025) upon recommendation by the Committee to Review Academic Programs to attach research and extension centers to appropriate degree-granting university units. In the UPFC's case, the Institute of Mass Communication became its parent unit. The policy was approved by the UP Board of Regents (BOR) and aimed to encourage interaction and close collaboration between the involved constituents in terms of teaching, research, and extension activities.

In September 1993, a triad committee was formed to review the status of the UPFC's attachment to the College of Media and Communication (abbreviated as CMC and formerly called College of Mass Communication until 2025) which apparently had not been effected. Chaired by Professor Merlin Magallona and with Professor Angela Sarile and Professor Efren Abaya as members, the committee was created by former UP President Emil Q. Javier in response to an inquiry by the late Senator Leticia Ramos-Shahani. In March 1994, the recommendation to unify the UPFC and the CMC's Department of Film and Audio-Visual Communication (DFAVC) was put forward by the committee. This was endorsed by President Javier to the BOR during its 1077th meeting on May 27, 1994, and was met with approval. On July 28 or two months later, the BOR reconsidered in its 1079th meeting the implementation of its decision regarding the merger "in view of a proposal to make a 'Film Academy' out of the Film Center." The academy was initially proposed by UPFC's Founding Director Virginia Moreno and was called the Academy of Cinematic Arts and Technology (ACINETEC). Consequently, the discussion on merging the UPFC and DFAVC was postponed indefinitely.

From the postponement onwards, there were multiple attempts to lift the BOR's deferment on the case of the UPFC and DFAVC. On August 24, 1994, the CMC Executive Board sent a letter to the BOR stating its position in favor of the merger and against the proposed ACINETEC. On September 22, former Vice-Chancellor for Academic Affairs Amaryllis Torres assembled a meeting with faculty and staff from both the UPFC and the CMC to discuss the formation of a UP Film Institute. However, further meetings were halted by President Javier on account of the BOR's pending appraisal of the ACINETEC. In January 1996, former Chancellor Roger Posadas put together a Transition Committee made up of former CMC Dean and UPFC Director Luis Teodoro, former DFAVC Chair Ellen Paglinauan, Professor Virginia Dandan of the College of Fine Arts, Professor Anthony Juan of the College of Arts and Letters, and Vice-Chancellor Torres as the chairperson. The committee was assigned to furnish the merger implementing guidelines for presentation to the BOR. However, the guidelines were not deliberated by the BOR until seven years later. Meanwhile, the proposed ACINETEC was also left unassessed since it was last raised in 1994.

On its 1169th meeting dated March 27, 2003, the BOR approved with finality its 1994 resolution to unify the UPFC and the DFAVC into one academic unit now recognized as the UP Film Institute. According to the merger proposal addressed to the BOR, the ACINETEC was rendered moot when Virginia Moreno requested on March 14, 2003, to have the UPFC's original autonomy restored under the university's Office of the President. The merger proposal indicates that one of the merits of the formation of the UP Film Institute was that it affirmed university policy, in contrast to Moreno's proposal which called for the BOR to rescind its decision in 1982 on requiring independent centers to be attached to colleges. As a film school, the unrealized ACINETEC shared similarities to the formally established UP Film Institute; it sought in the past to establish a three-year course leading to a Certificate in Cinematic Arts and Technology, a program conceptualized by the UPFC and authorized by the BOR as early as 1979.

=== Past events and programs ===
Before the introduction of a film degree in the UP Institute of Mass Communication, the UPFC pioneered in film training through international exchanges. It opened lectures and workshops that gave students the opportunity to train under invited luminaries of the time, such as Vilgot Sjöman, Werner Schroeter, Peter Kern, Kōhei Oguri, Christopher Giercke, Don Pennebaker, Wolfgang Längsfeld, Dan Wolman, Alexander Walker, and Tadao Sato among others. One of the early outcomes of these exchanges was the Cinéma Direct Workshop facilitated by French filmmakers Alain Martenot and Jean-Loïc Portron, former directors of the Paris-based association Ateliers Varan. (Note: For the French Wikipedia article, see Ateliers Varan.) Part of a diplomatic program funded by the Embassy of France, the workshop ran for two months beginning late April 1982 and provided intensive training in Super-8 filmmaking. Participants were lent filming equipment and tasked with creating their own individual films. Although the Varan association had been to other parts of the world before it came to the UP Film Center, the Philippines was the first country it visited in Asia to conduct its courses. The UP Film Center was also the Cinéma Direct Workshop's first location, following a series of film programs that would later travel to other regions in the country. Another program during the 1980s was a seminar on the history of German experimental cinema organized in collaboration with the Goethe-Institut. Initially held in September 1984, the "lively response" encouraged subsequent Germany-sponsored film programs to be arranged, with the latter ones taking place at the Mowelfund Film Institute in the late 1900s.

The early 1980s also saw the Film Center organize the Manila Short Film Festival led by Nick Deocampo, an exhibition and later competition for original short films. The first edition of the festival was held in April 1981 in the Wilfrido Ma. Guerrero Theater and proceeded with further editions for several years before dissolving. The Manila Short Film Festival focused on independent and experimental works and has been credited for its role in helping establish the alternative movement in Philippine cinema.

== Academics ==
In 1984, the College of Media and Communication, formerly called Institute of Mass Communication (IMC) until 1988, then College of Mass Communication until 2025, introduced Film and Audio-Visual Communication as one of its undergraduate program offerings, which became known as the first of its kind in the Philippines. Joel David, a graduate of journalism, enrolled in the program that same year and in 1986 became the first film baccalaureate holder in the country, after graduating as the sole film major in his class. Master's degree programs, on the other hand, were offered in the IMC as early as 1966, but it was not until 2002 that Film would be added as a new area of concentration under its MA Media Studies program (Note: The program was formerly called MA Communication but was renamed in 2001 to emphasize the study of media as "a consciousness industry and cultural practice." In 2012, MA Journalism was instituted as a separate degree, leaving Broadcast Communication and Film as the remaining areas of concentration under the MA Media Studies program.) alongside concentrations in Broadcast Communication and Journalism.

As a degree-granting unit, the UP Film Institute trains and instructs its students in the practice and scholarship of cinema, culminating into individual production- or study-based theses. The coursework for the undergraduate level is designed to encompass all aspects of cinema while the postgraduate level is focused on the study and praxis of cinema with an emphasis on globalization and new media. Among the prominent academics that have taught in the Institute are Grace Javier Alfonso, Tilman Baumgärtel, Joel David, Nick Deocampo, Ingo Petzke, Arminda Santiago, Nicanor Tiongson, and Roland Tolentino.

According to its mission, the UP Film Institute aims to produce graduates who would share in its goal of "contributing to the development of genuinely Filipino national cinema." Its current end is in "increasing professionalization in Philippine film practice and upgrading local film scholarship." Aside from degree programs, the UP Film Institute also regularly holds workshops and seminars on various cinema-related topics for students and non-academics alike.

=== Degree programs ===
- Bachelor of Arts in Film
- Master of Arts in Media Studies (Film)

=== Institute directors ===
Prior to the merger with the Department of Film and Audio-Visual Communication, the UP Film Center had an appointed director since it was founded in 1976. The UP Film Center itself evolved from a smaller organization, the UP Film Society, which saw a burgeoning in the early 1970s amid student unrest during martial law. Eventually, the title "UP Film Center Director" was renamed into "UPFI Director" to reflect the change within the Institute's administration.

UP Film Center Directors (1976 to 2002)
Director	Term
Virginia R. Moreno	1976–1989
Bienvenido L. Lumbera, PhD	1989–1992
Delia R. Barcelona, PhD	1992–1994
Luis V. Teodoro Jr.	1994–2000
Elizabeth L. Enriquez, PhD; Victor C. Avecilla, JD	2000–2002

UP Film Institute Directors (2002 to date)
Director	Term
Jose Hernani "Joel" S. David, PhD	2002–2004
Rolando "Roland" B. Tolentino, PhD	2004–2005
Anne Marie G. De Guzman	2005–2009
Eduardo "Ed" J. Lejano Jr.	2009–2012
Roehl L. Jamon	2012–2015
Sari Raissa L. Dalena	2015–2018
Patrick F. Campos, PhD	2018–2021
Robert "Rob" L. Rownd	2021–2024
Jason "Yason" B. Banal	2024–present

=== Student organizations ===
There are four student organizations housed in the UP Film Institute. Of the four, the Filmmaker's Guild of UP (FGUP) is believed to be inactive. The organizations are associated with the College of Media and Communication and are academic-based, non-profit, and university-wide.

- UP Cineastes' Studio – founded September 24, 1984
- UP Cinema – founded February 25, 2004
- UP Cinema Arts Society (CAST) – founded August 24, 1990
- Filmmakers' Guild of UP (FGUP) – founded 2011 (Inactive)

=== Publication ===
The UP Film Institute publishes the journal Pelikula, officially named Pelikula: A Journal of Philippine Cinema and Moving Image. The journal "broadly covers national and regional perspectives on Philippine cinema and publishes academic articles, opinion pieces, reviews, interviews, and visual essays."

Before the UP Film Institute's establishment, Pelikula was published by two non-profit organizations, namely the UP College of Mass Communication Foundation, Inc. and the Laurel-Rufino-Prieto Foundation, Inc. and was managed by the Department of Film and Audio-Visual Communication of then UP College of Mass Communication under the editorship of Nicanor G. Tiongson. Though slated to be semiannual, Pelikula's first volume came out in September 1999 with a single issue. This was followed by a second volume with two issues (March to August 2000 and September 2000 to February 2001), and a third with a single issue (March to August 2001). Since then, no further volumes were published for an extended period of time due to lack of funding.

In 2019, the Pelikula journal was revived by the UP Film Institute, led by Associate Professor Patrick F. Campos, as part of its commemorative event celebrating Philippine cinema's hundredth-year existence. On December 18, 2020, the fourth and fifth volumes of Pelikula (2019 and 2020, respectively) were made publicly available for download through the journal's own website. They were the first two volumes to appear jointly since Pelikula was last published 18 years ago.

== Facilities ==
The UP Film Institute's facilities consists of the UPFI Media Center and the UPFI Film Center, two separate buildings located in the northern area of the University of the Philippines Diliman campus. Going from one building to the other would take one along establishments such as the Plaridel Hall, the Abelardo Hall, the University Theater, the UP Carillon Tower, and the Washington SyCip Garden of Native Trees. The two Centers are around a five-minute walk away from each other.

=== UPFI Media Center ===
The UPFI Media Center is a two-story building complex situated beside the Plaridel Hall. It consists of classrooms, offices, laboratories, and a 210-square-meter film studio that generally functions as a teaching facility and production space. The studio hosts workshops and events occasionally and serves as an alternative venue to the UPFI Film Center. The broadcast station of DZUP, a campus radio station owned and operated by UP Diliman, is also located in the Media Center.

Before the COVID-19 pandemic, the Media Center can be seen to be frequented by visitors who come to the place for film auditions, most of which are mounted by students for their productions. On February 26, 2019, the Media Center served as one of the casting locations for Fan Girl, a romance-thriller film directed by Antoinette Jadaone.

=== UPFI Film Center ===
The UPFI Film Center or simply known as the Film Center (Note: There are recorded instances where the acronym "UPFC" is also used to refer to the UPFI Film Center as a physical venue.) is a 4,000-square-meter building complex that shares the same name as the academic entity that preceded it, the UP Film Center (UPFC). Nowadays, the UPFI Film Center is generally used to refer to the physical venue rather than the disestablished entity. The building complex is recognizable by its predominantly red brick façade and consists of three facilities: the Cine Adarna and its extensions, the Ishmael Bernal Gallery and the Videotheque. Its construction began on April 24, 1976, and was finished by 1984. In 1990, former members of the UPFC came to occupy the building. The UPFI Film Center was designed by Honorato Paloma and has been described as an early example of postmodern architecture.

==== Cine Adarna ====
The Cine Adarna is a 1,920-square-meter movie theater with a seating capacity of 800 persons. It comprises the bulk of the UPFI Film Center building complex and was known as the Film Theater or Main Theater before it was renamed in 2005. The new name takes after the Ibong Adarna, a mythical bird in Philippine folklore. The bird is depicted with plumage of golden film stock in the Cine Adarna's official logo designed by production and graphic designer Cesar Hernando. The logo ultimately became the concomitant image of the UP Film Institute as a whole by expressing its "institutional ideals and at the same time evoking the Filipino spirit."

Each year, a diversity of films are lined-up and exhibited daily at the Cine Adarna, with some offering free admission. While most of the titles are local, the Cine Adarna is a lodestone for international film festivals and programs and showcases world cinema in cooperation with different embassies and cultural organizations. Some of the festivals that have had its leg at the arthouse are Película, the Brazilian Film Festival, QCinema, the Japanese Film Festival (formerly known as Eigasai), the Iranian Film Festival, and DMZ Docs. The Cine Adarna also regularly screens festival winners and nominees, as well as classics, indies, retrospectives, student shorts, and documentaries among others. While primarily a cinema, other public or private academic and recreational events have also taken place inside the theater such as graduations, performances, and symposia.

Besides being equipped with a Dolby Digital 5.1 sound system and a Christie digital projector, the Cine Adarna also operates a functional 16mm and 35mm film projector. This makes the Cine Adarna one of the only two known exhibitors in the Philippines capable of screening movies in traditional film format, together with the Museum of Contemporary Art and Design of the De La Salle–College of Saint Benilde.

==== Ishmael Bernal Gallery and Videotheque ====
The Ishmael Bernal Gallery is an 80-square-meter alternative space primarily used for art exhibits and installations, cocktails, receptions, and workshops. Named in honor of the late Filipino filmmaker and National Artist Ishmael Bernal, the Gallery houses a collection of film-related paraphernalia such as antiquated film and animation equipment and has been home to objects such as Bernal's National Artist medallion, archival posters, and photographs. Located on the Gallery's second floor is the Videotheque, a 55-square-meter theater with a seating capacity of 60 persons. Aside from film screenings, the Videotheque functions as a venue for lectures and forums.

== Film Screenings ==
The UP Film Institute is one of two public institutions in the country, the other being the Cultural Center of the Philippines, whose cinemas are recognized as exempt from state censorship by virtue of their respective academic and cultural mandates. This has allowed the UPFI to exhibit films in their original, uncut versions which have otherwise been deemed unsuitable for public viewing by the Movie and Television Review and Classification Board (MTRCB), a government agency serving as the de facto censorship body in the Philippines. Some of the MTRCB-sanctioned films that have been screened by the UPFI are The Last Temptation of Christ, Orapronobis, Death in the Land of Encantos, Imburnal, Aurora (2009), Sagwan, Strictly Confidential: Confessions of Men, and Bliss.

=== COVID-19 ===
On March 10, 2020, the UP Film Institute announced the indefinite postponement of all its film screenings and other forthcoming events in compliance with COVID-19 health protocols. No shows have since been held physically at the Cine Adarna nor in any of UPFI's facilities, with all affiliated events taking place in virtual channels instead. Two years later on May 21, 2022, the UPFI reopened the Cine Adarna, albeit to an outdoor screening of Pier Paolo Pasolini's Accattone, in celebration of the Italian director's centennial. The special screening was helmed in partnership with the Embassy of Italy in the Philippines and was free and open to the public. It took place with limited seats at the portico of the Cine Adarna.

== Controversies ==
=== Screening of gay-oriented films ===
In early 2009, a number of Filipino gay-oriented films being screened at the UPFI caught the attention of the tabloid press. On February 9, 2009, the UPFI became the subject of a piece that appeared in a local tabloid called Philippine Journal. Written by Mario E. Bautista, the column was entitled "UP NO PLACE FOR GAY PORNO" and opined that the UPFI is "fast getting the reputation of being a haven for pornographic films" due to the perceived prurience of the uncut films being shown there at the time. About a week following the column's publication, the UPFI received word that its film screenings will be monitored by the Movie and Television Review and Classification Board (MTRCB) and if they are found to be pornographic, MTRCB will file complaints in court. In defense of UPFI, Professor Marichu Lambino of the College of Media nd Communication stated in an online post that it is the UPFI's jurisdiction not the MTRCB's to decide on the film programming of the Institute since it is tied to its objectives of providing higher education and raising film literacy, academic matters over which the MTRCB "cannot in any official capacity be made to believe that they can exercise their monitoring function" [sic]. Professor Lambino also challenged the MTRCB's standards in deeming a film pornographic and invited scrutiny over the social and artistic merits of the gay-oriented films being screened at the UPFI.

=== Red-tagging ===
On October 4, 2018, the UPFI released an official statement denouncing allegations by the Armed Forces of the Philippines (AFP) that the University of the Philippines, among other schools, were recruiting students to the Communist Party of the Philippines (CCP) through screenings of films critical of martial law. The allegations came from BGen. Antonio Parlade Jr., Assistant Deputy Chief of Staff for Operations of the AFP, who said in a report by CNN Philippines, "What's new is that they (CPP) are inciting students to rebel because of the issues on extrajudicial killings, that's why they have film showings." In a statement, the UPFI called on AFP to rectify BGen. Parlade's claims and deplored how the allegations not only undermined the UPFI's institutional standing but also "the very ideals of truth, justice, and honor."

== Notable alumni (selection) ==
- Giancarlo Abrahan – film director, educator, screenwriter
- Ronald Arguelles – film producer
- Adjani Arumpac – documentary filmmaker, film educator, art writer
- Bianca Balbuena – film producer
- Glenn Barit – film director
- Ramon Bautista – film educator, actor, comedian, television host
- Joyce Bernal – film director, producer
- Richard Bolisay – film critic, educator, writer
- Armi Rae Cacanindin – film producer
- Patrick F. Campos – film educator, researcher, writer
- Libay Cantor – media practitioner, educator, artist, writer
- Tey Clamor – cinematographer
- Arleen Cuevas – film producer
- Sari Dalena – film director, educator
- Joel David – film critic, educator, researcher, writer
- Pepe Diokno – film director
- Pio Dumayas – musician
- Hannah Espia – film director
- Martika Ramirez Escobar – film director, cinematographer
- Sol Garcia – cinematographer
- Cathy Garcia-Molina – film director
- JP Habac – film director
- Antoinette Jadaone – film director
- Theo Lozada – cinematographer
- Raya Martin – film director
- Carlo Francisco Manatad – film director, editor
- Jewel Maranan – documentary filmmaker
- Lyle Sacris – film and music video director, cinematographer
- Joaquin Pedro Valdes – stage actor and singer
- Petersen Vargas – film director
