= Jose E. Marco =

Filipino forger

Jose E. Marco (died 1963) was a Filipino writer and forger who created some of the most infamous hoaxes and forgeries relating to Philippine history, producing artifacts purported to have come from the pre-colonial and Spanish eras such as the Code of Kalantiaw, touted as the first law code in the Philippines, and La Loba Negra, a novel supposedly written by Filipino proto-nationalist priest Jose Burgos which became part of the country's educational curriculum for decades.

== Life ==
Little is known about Marco's personal life apart from that he came from Pontevedra, Negros Occidental.

== Works ==
Marco first began producing his forgeries in 1911, when he wrote a letter to National Library of the Philippines director James Alexander Robertson claiming that he was in possession of three precolonial bark manuscripts that he discovered in 1888. He later claimed he acquired these manuscripts from a mountaineer named Ygo Syka for 18 pesos and exchanged them for rare books being disposed of by the National Library in 1912.

Robertson, best known for co-compiling the 55-volume collection of Philippine historical documents titled The Philippine Islands, 1493–1898, attested that the artefacts were authentic. The manuscripts were displayed in the National Library and were believed to have been destroyed during the Battle of Manila in 1945.

In 1913, Marco produced his most famous "work", the Code of Kalantiaw, allegedly a pre-colonial legal code written in 1433 by Datu Kalantiaw, a chieftain from Panay. His work led to the renaming of buildings, places and even the flagship of the Philippine Navy after Kalantiaw, who was deemed the "First Filipino Lawgiver", as well as the creation of a civil decoration for the Philippine judiciary in Kalantiaw's honor.

Marco subsequently produced another work on the origins of the Philippines and Philippine folklore titled Philippine Folklore in 1940, providing etymologies of place-names, mythologies behind native plants, and other legends and folktales. He also created a manuscript that claimed to provide evidence of Filipino participation in the creation of the Cadiz Constitution in 1812 and an extended account of the Magellan expedition in Cebu.

After the Second World War, Marco continued to come up with precolonial artefacts and writings by Filipino national heroes. Among these was La Loba Negra (The Black She-wolf), a novel purportedly written by Filipino proto-nationalist priest Jose Burgos, who was executed by the Spanish for purported involvement in the Cavite Mutiny in 1872, and was among 45 supposed works by Burgos that he claimed to have discovered in the 1960s. La Loba Negra was subsequently turned into a play by Virginia Moreno in 1969 titled The Onyx Wolf and an opera by Francisco Feliciano with libretto by Fides Cuyugan-Asensio in 1984.

== Exposure ==
Around the 1960s, bibliographer Mauro Garcia, who was an initial believer and collector of Marco's discoveries, gradually became suspicious of their provenance. He discussed his suspicions with American historian and long-time Philippine researcher William Henry Scott, who then formally denounced Marco in his 1969 work Prehispanic source materials for the study of Philippine history. Further denunciations were made by Jesuit scholars Miguel Bernad and John Schumacher, which prevented the further publication of Burgos' supposed manuscripts.

== Aftermath ==
The unmasking of Marco's hoaxes led to a gradual decline in attention to his works, with the National Historical Institute ordering the withdrawal of official recognition of the Code of Kalantiaw in 2004. Historian and former NHI Chair Ambeth Ocampo compared the dissemination and usage of Marco's works in historical research to stumbling upon "land mines". Nevertheless, some Filipino history textbooks continue to present it as historical fact.

== In popular culture ==
Marco's life is the subject of Rene Villanueva's play Kalantiaw: Ang Kagila-gilalas na Kasinungalingan Tungkol sa Isang Kayumangging Bayan (Kalantiaw: The Amazing Lies about a Brown Nation), which won first prize at the Palanca Awards in 1994.

Marco was portrayed by Joel Lamangan in Floy Quintos's play Fake which was presented by the UP Playwrights’ Theater and directed by Tony Mabesa in 2011.
