= José Marco =

José Marco may refer to:

- José Marco (cyclist)
- José Marco (politician), Spanish politician
- José Marco (actor) (born 1925), Spanish film actor
- José Marco Davó (1895–1974), Spanish film actor
- Jose E. Marco, Filipino forger
- José Marco, possibly fictitious stuntman allegedly killed during the making of the 1969 film Shark!
