= Batan, Aklan =

Municipality in Aklan, Philippines

Batan
- Municipality
- Municipality of Batan
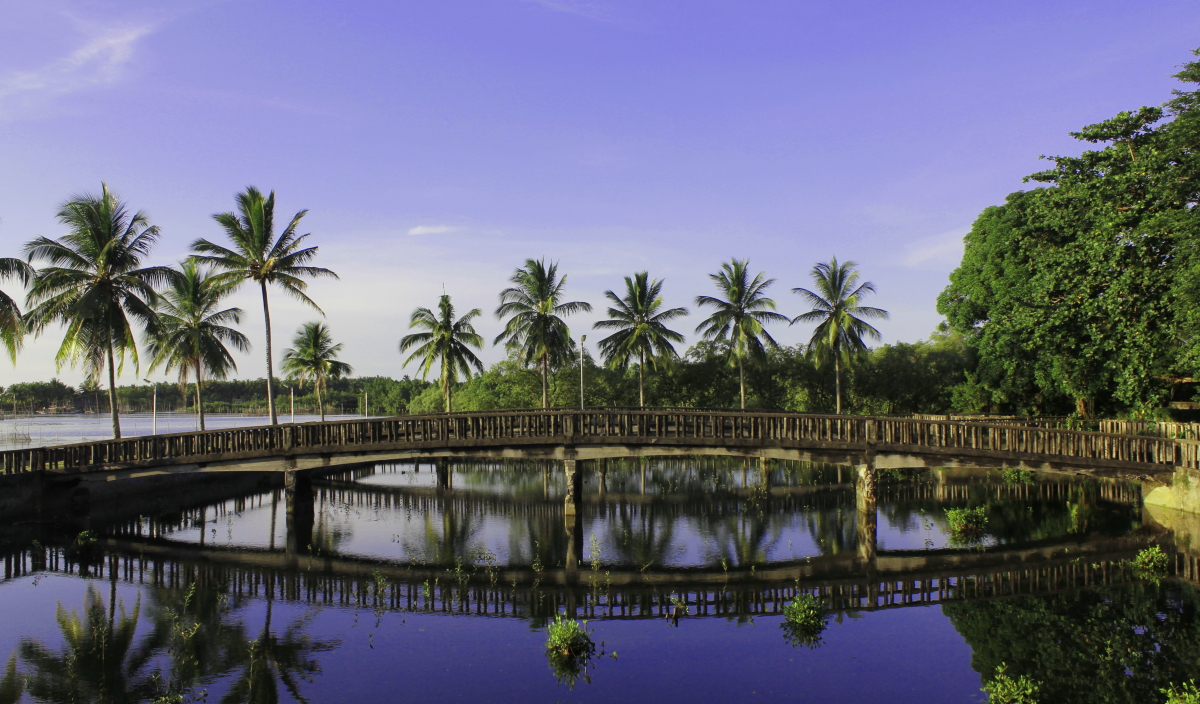
- Kalantiaw Shrine Bridge

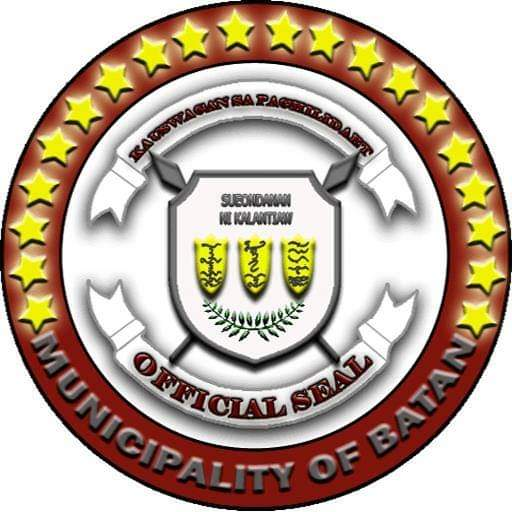
- Flag Seal

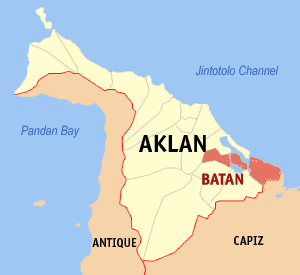
- Map of Aklan with Batan highlighted
- Interactive map of Batan
- Location within the Philippines
- Coordinates: 11°35′07″N 122°29′53″E
- Country: Philippines
- Region: Western Visayas
- Province: Aklan
- District: 1st district
- Barangays: 20 (see Barangays)

Government
  - Type: Sangguniang Bayan
  - Mayor: Mike Ramos
  - Vice Mayor: Bodjyk Demeterio
  - Representative: Jess Marquez
  - Electorate: 24,516 voters (2025)

Area
  - Total: 79.22 km^{2} (30.59 sq mi)
- Elevation: 30 m (98 ft)
- Highest elevation: 383 m (1,257 ft)
- Lowest elevation: 0 m (0 ft)

Population (2024 census)
  - Total: 33,932
  - Density: 428.3/km^{2} (1,109/sq mi)
  - Households: 8,411

Economy
  - Income class: 3rd municipal income class
  - Poverty incidence: 12.49% (2023)
  - Revenue: ₱ 160.3 million (2024)
  - Assets: ₱ 441.5 million (2024)
  - Expenditure: ₱ 150.8 million (2024)
  - Liabilities: ₱ 59.18 million (2024)

Service provider
  - Electricity: Aklan Electric Cooperative (AKELCO)
- Time zone: UTC+8 (PST)
- ZIP code: 5615
- PSGC: 060404000
- IDD : area code: +63 (0)36
- Native languages: Aklanon; Hiligaynon; Capisnon; Tagalog
- Website: batan-aklan.gov.ph

Batan, officially the Municipality of Batan (Aklanon: Banwa it Batan; Hiligaynon: Banwa sang Batan; Tagalog: Bayan ng Batan), is a third-class municipality in the province of Aklan, Philippines. According to the 2024 census, it has a population of 33,932 people.

== History ==
=== Pre-Hispanic Period ===
Batan was believed to be the seat of the government of Datu Bendahara Kalantiaw III, the promulgator of the Code of Kalantiaw in 1433. The code is a collection of 17 laws said to have been used during the time of the Datu before the coming of the Spaniards. The Code of Kalantiaw was later proven to be a fraud.

=== Spanish Colonial Era ===
Batan is one of the oldest towns founded in Aklan. Batan was formerly an encomienda of Miguel Rodriguez in 1591. The parish in Batan was established by the Augustinians in 1601 under the patronage of Our Lady of Immaculate Conception. Batan was first incorporated into Aclan or Aklan (now Kalibo) in 1603 and in 1789 it became an independent municipality. The 1818 Spanish census showed that there were 2,255 native families and 56 Spanish-Filipino families flourishing here.

In 1903, Batan was again incorporated to the new town of New Washington and became independent again in 1931.

=== Independent Philippines ===
In 1957, the Kalantiaw National Shrine marker was erected by the Philippine Historical and Cultural Society to honor the significance of Datu Kalantiaw where it displays a copy of the “original manuscript” of the Code. It was built on a former school building near the municipal seaport which houses the town's historical mementos and antiques, including the original manuscript of the code which the Spaniards obtained from an old chief and translated. In 2004 however, after years of investigation and historical findings, the National Historical Institute concluded that the Code of Kalantiaw was fake and a hoax. Remnants of the Kalantiaw National Shrine marker still remain in Batan, Aklan and the site area was renovated as a park for tourists and locals.

== Geography ==
Batan is 49 kilometres (30 mi) from the provincial capital of Kalibo and 51 kilometres (32 mi) from Roxas City.

According to the Philippine Statistics Authority, the municipality has a land area of 79.22 square kilometres (30.59 sq mi) constituting 4.35% of the 1,821.42-square-kilometre- (703.25 sq mi) total area of Aklan.

=== Climate ===
Climate data for Batan, Aklan
Month	Jan	Feb	Mar	Apr	May	Jun	Jul	Aug	Sep	Oct	Nov	Dec	Year
Mean daily maximum °C (°F)	28 (82)	29 (84)	30 (86)	32 (90)	32 (90)	31 (88)	30 (86)	30 (86)	29 (84)	29 (84)	29 (84)	28 (82)	30 (86)
Mean daily minimum °C (°F)	23 (73)	22 (72)	23 (73)	24 (75)	25 (77)	25 (77)	25 (77)	24 (75)	24 (75)	24 (75)	24 (75)	23 (73)	24 (75)
Average precipitation mm (inches)	47 (1.9)	33 (1.3)	39 (1.5)	48 (1.9)	98 (3.9)	150 (5.9)	169 (6.7)	147 (5.8)	163 (6.4)	172 (6.8)	118 (4.6)	80 (3.1)	1,264 (49.8)
Average rainy days	11.4	8.2	9.3	9.7	19.1	25.6	27.4	25.5	25.5	25.2	18.5	14.5	219.9
Source: Meteoblue (Use with caution: this is modeled/calculated data, not measured locally.)

=== Barangays ===
Batan is politically subdivided into 20 barangays. Each barangay consists of puroks and some have sitios.

PSGC	Barangay	Population			±% p.a.	
		2024		2010		
060404001	Ambolong	6.8%	2,302	2,047	▴	0.82%
060404002	Angas	4.6%	1,577	1,456	▴	0.56%
060404003	Bay-ang	6.2%	2,120	2,096	▴	0.08%
060404005	Cabugao	7.1%	2,408	1,948	▴	1.48%
060404004	Caiyang	2.8%	941	832	▴	0.86%
060404006	Camaligan	8.3%	2,821	2,616	▴	0.53%
060404007	Camanci	7.7%	2,628	2,544	▴	0.23%
060404008	Ipil	1.4%	484	504	▾	−0.28%
060404009	Lalab	8.8%	2,990	2,820	▴	0.41%
060404010	Lupit	4.6%	1,562	1,593	▾	−0.14%
060404011	Magpag-ong	4.0%	1,359	1,432	▾	−0.36%
060404012	Magubahay	1.6%	550	596	▾	−0.56%
060404013	Mambuquiao	4.2%	1,442	1,418	▴	0.12%
060404014	Man-up	2.9%	972	911	▴	0.45%
060404015	Mandong	5.0%	1,701	1,525	▴	0.76%
060404016	Napti	3.3%	1,120	1,011	▴	0.71%
060404017	Palay	4.0%	1,371	1,453	▾	−0.40%
060404018	Poblacion	4.7%	1,611	1,547	▴	0.28%
060404019	Songcolan	3.4%	1,160	1,122	▴	0.23%
060404020	Tabon	2.7%	913	841	▴	0.57%
	Total		33,932	30,312	▴	0.79%

== Demographics ==
Population census of Batan
Year	Pop.	±% p.a.
1903	14,315	—
1939	11,966	−0.50%
1948	14,714	+2.32%
1960	17,466	+1.44%
1970	20,025	+1.37%
1975	21,248	+1.20%
1980	23,393	+1.94%
1990	25,710	+0.95%
1995	26,415	+0.51%
2000	27,889	+1.17%
2007	29,243	+0.66%
2010	30,312	+1.32%
2015	32,032	+1.06%
2020	33,484	+0.94%
2024	33,932	+0.32%
Source: Philippine Statistics Authority

In the 2024 census, Batan had a population of 33,932. The population density was 430 inhabitants per square kilometre (1,100/sq mi).

=== Language ===
Aklanon is the main dialect of Batan while Hiligaynon is also spoken and understood in the municipality. Capiznon is also used due to Batan’s proximity to Capiz.

== Economy ==
Poverty incidence of Batan (%)

Source: Philippine Statistics Authority

== Government ==
Based on the official results of the May 2025 Philippine Mid-Term Elections, Batan's local government unit is led by:

• Mayor - Mike Ramos (AKSYON)

• Vice Mayor - Bodjyk Demeterio (AKSYON)

The members of the Sangguniang Bayan (Councilors/Konsehals) of the Lone District of Batan are:

1. William Bautista Jr. (LAKAS)

2. Pogi Perlas (NPC)

3. Chan Chan David (LAKAS)

4. Eric Del Rosario (NPC)

5. Kap Nonong Jacinto (AKSYON)

6. Bong Penalba (AKSYON)

7. Joy Ramos (LP)

8. Doc Dee Bautista (LAKAS)

== Tourism ==
- Tinago Lake or locally known as Tinagong Dagat, is located between the town (near Brgys. Magpag-ong, Ipil and Tabon) and Altavas. It is an 8-kilometre (5.0 mi) long and 4-kilometre (2.5 mi) wide "hidden sea" from Batan's bay by two islands. Fringed with mangroves and thick undergrowth, it has a rocky beach and it is one of the town's rich fishing grounds. It is also ideal for speed boating and water skiing. It is also one of the sources of fresh oysters in Batan.
- Ob-Ob Hill – The 200-metre (660 ft) high and rocky Ob-Ob Hill is located east of Poblacion, Batan in barangay Songcolan and it has a sweeping view of the Sibuyan Sea, fish ponds and rice fields. At the foot of the hill is a beach ideal for underwater cave diving, scuba diving, fishing, and water sports. It is also one of the rich fishing grounds in Batan.
- Kalantiaw Shrine Marker is a historical marker named after Datu Bendahara Kalantiaw III, the third chief of Panay, who is said to have instituted the Code of Kalantiaw in Batan in 1433.
- Mambuquiao Marine Protected Area and Fish Sanctuary is a coral reef turned into a fish sanctuary. Locally called pito, it has the highest live coral cover in Salian Bay. It is ideal for boating, swimming, snorkeling, and scuba diving.
- Macawiwili Mountains is located in Barangay Lalab.
- Puting Bato is a protected wildlife area located in Barangay Angas.
- Pandan Hills is a verdant hill in Barangay Bay-ang overlooking the Sibuyan Sea. It is dubbed as Batan, Aklan's version of Batanes' Marlboro Hills.
- Old Spanish relics from the Spanish colonization period such as the Spanish cannon, Spanish distilleries and old Spanish cemeteries with brick facades can still be seen in Batan, Aklan.
- Aroma Beach Resort is located in Barangay Napti. It features a saltwater pool.
- Borabucay Beach Resort is located in Barangay Songcolan. It is the favorite hangout place of Batangnons and Capiznons.
- Waterfront Beach Resort is located in Barangay Songcolan. It is one of the newest resorts in Batan that is just beside the Borabucay resort.
- Mambu Rise Beach Resort is located in Barangay Mambuquiao. It is a lifestyle resort and features live bands during weekends.
- Paradwys Beach Resort is located in Barangay Napti.
- Casa Del Mar is located in Barangay Ambolong.
- RainForest Botanical Garden is located in Barangay Ambolong. It is an event place that features vegetables, herbal plants, fruit-bearing trees, and flowering plants.
- The Church of Our Lady of Immaculate Conception in Poblacion, Batan. It is considered as one of the oldest churches in Aklan. The church celebrated its quadri-centennial (400 years) of parish existence in 2002.
- Punta, Magpag-ong is a refreshing place to go because it features a sweeping view of the sea. Perfect for those who want to relax and enjoy with its floating BALSA and meditate with nature.
- Batan Municipal Seaport is a port located in Poblacion and considered the oldest in the province of Aklan. It is L-type and made up of concrete materials having a total length of 130 meters. It can accommodate inter-island shipping. The port is the shortest route entry and exit from Batan to the capital town of Kalibo via Dumaguit. A ferry boat service is available every 15 minutes, with a travel time of 4–5 minutes.
- San Lorenzo Ruiz de Manila Parish Church is a parish church in Barangay Camaligan dedicated to San Ruiz de Manila, the first Filipino Martyr and Saint, at the time of his beautification and canonization by Pope John Paul II at Vatican City formal religious ceremonies in Manila, Philippines.
- Camanci Falls is a waterfall that attributes to the natural scenery of Brgy. Camanci and features freshness among the wilderness.

Batan has beaches, marine life, seafood (including crabs, lobsters, and shrimps), coconut products, grain produce, root crops, fruits, and large forests. Local edible clams called 'kagaykay' can be found along Batan's shorelines, especially in Brgy. Songcolan, Brgy. Mandong, Brgy. Napti, and Brgy. Mambuquiao.

Batan is also known for a special puto cake or steamed rice cake in several different flavors such as cheese and buko. It is a filling and ideal snack because it is about 6-8 inches in diameter, big enough to fill the stomachs of a small group. An advanced reservation is needed to taste this local delicacy that is unique to Brgy. Mandong in Batan.

=== Local Festivals ===
- Santo Niñohan or Ati-Ati and Malakara Festival (in honor of the Holy Child) is celebrated every third Saturday and Sunday of January. This festival is very similar to the well-known Ati-Atihan of Kalibo, Aklan. Its difference from Kalibo's Ati-Atihan is that participants are required to use native and indigenous materials as the main components of their costumes and props.
- Immaculate Conception, Batan's Municipal and Religious Fiesta, is celebrated every December 8. It is a weeklong celebration composed of various activities like street parades, foodfest, dance competition, basketball tournament, drum & lyre competition, boat race, marathon, a showcase of local products from each barangay, consecrated mass & flower offering at Kalantiaw Shrine, Lakambini ni Kalantiaw beauty pageant, merrymaking and a concert at the local playground or park performed by DJs, dance groups and OPM bands or artists like Rocksteddy, Hale, Siakol, Brownman Revival and Arnel Pineda.
- Juez De Cuchillo is always held every October 19 to commemorate the capture and beheading of 79 innocent Batangnon civilians on October 19, 1943, by the Japanese Imperial Army. A program, re-enactment, and flower offering are held at the site where the victims were beheaded and slaughtered by the Japanese soldiers. A marker was erected by local officials and relatives of the victims for their remembrance.

== Education ==
The Batan Schools District Office governs all educational institutions within the municipality. It oversees the management and operations of all private and public, from primary to secondary schools.

=== Primary and elementary schools ===
- Batan Elementary School
- Batan Learning Center
- Bay-ang Elementary School
- Nicolas R. Delgado Elementary School
- Cabugao Elementary School
- Caiyang Elementary School
- Camaligan Elementary School
- Camanci Elementary School
- I Learn Child Center – Batan
- Ipil Elementary School
- Lalab Elementary School
- Lupit Elementary School
- Magubahay Elementary School
- Mambuquiao Elementary School
- Mandong Integrated School
- Man-up Elementary School
- Napti Elementary School
- Palay Elementary School
- Songcolan Elementary School
- Tabon Elementary School
- Talangban Elementary School

=== Secondary schools ===
- Angas Integrated School
- Batan Academy (A National School)
- Batan Academy (A National School) – Lalab Extension
- Bay-ang – Magpag-ong National High School
- Camaligan National High School
- Camanci National High School
- Ipil Integrated School
- Kalantiaw Institute (KI)
- Napti Integrated School
- Rizal J. Rodriguez Sr. National High School
- Tabon Integrated School
- Mandong Integrated School

=== Higher educational institution ===
- Batan Integrated College of Technology (formerly BCC or Batan Community College)
