= Tabon, Batan =

Island in Aklan, Philippines

Tabon
- Location within Philippines

Geography
- Location: Tinagong Dagat
- Coordinates: 11°36′N 122°30′E
- Adjacent to: Jintotolo Channel; Sibuyan Sea

Administration
- Philippines
- Region: Western Visayas
- Province: Aklan
- Municipality: Batan
- Barangay: Tabon

Tabon Island is an island located in the province of Aklan in the Philippines. The island is enclosed in Tinagong Dagat (Hidden sea), a bay in the province with a narrow opening to the Sibuyan Sea.

Tabon is an island-barangay, one of the twenty barangays of the historic municipality of Batan in Aklan, the home of the alleged Datu Kalantiaw in pre-colonial Philippines. The barangay has a population of 902 as of August 1, 2007.
