= Code of Kalantiaw =

Fictitious historical legal code

The Code of Rajah Kalantiaw was a supposed legal code in the epic history Maragtas of Panay, allegedly written in 1433 by Datu Kalantiaw, a chieftain on the island of Negros in the Philippines. It is now generally accepted by historians that the documents supporting the existence and history of the code, according to some sources, "appear to be deliberate fabrications with no historical validity" written in 1913 by a scholar named Jose Marco as a part of a historical fiction titled Las antiguas leyendas de la Isla de Negros (English: The Ancient Legends of the Island of Negros).

In 1990, Philippine historian Teodoro Agoncillo described the code as "a disputed document." Despite doubts on its authenticity, some history textbooks continue to present it as historical fact. In 2005, the National Historical Commission of the Philippines officially recognized Kalantiaw and the Code of Kalantiaw to be a 20th-century fraudulent work by José Marco with no historical basis.

== History and authenticity dispute ==
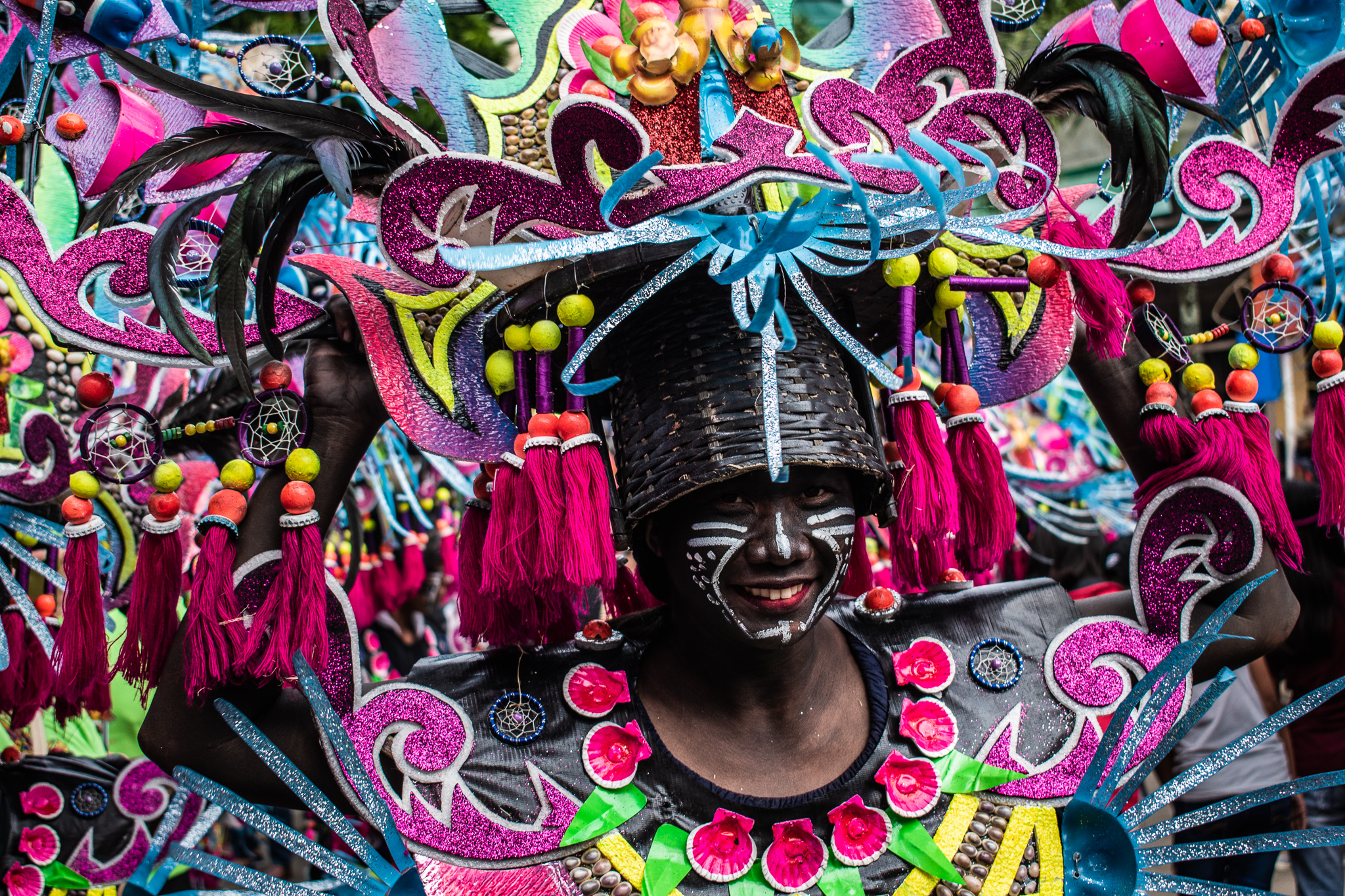
A woman at the Kalibo Ati-Atihan Festival.

Jose Marco wrote about the Code of Kalantiaw in his 1917 book Historia Prehispana de Filipinas ("Prehispanic History of the Philippines") where he moved the location of the Code's origin from Negros to the Panay province of Aklan because he suspected that it may be related to the Ati-atihan festival. Other authors throughout the 20th century gave credence to the story and the code.

It first gained scholarly acceptance when Marco donated five manuscripts of the fraudulent documents to the American historian James Alexander Robertson. Robertson presented it in San Francisco in 1915 in a paper entitled Social structure of, and ideas of law among early Philippine peoples, in a recently discovered pre-Hispanic criminal code of the Philippine Islands. Robertson was a notable proponent of Anti-Spanish "black legend" propaganda and had also deliberately distorted translations of Spanish documents of the Philippines in the compilation The Philippine Islands, 1493–1898 (1903–1907) co-authored with Emma Helen Blair.

In 1965, then University of Santo Tomas doctoral candidate William Henry Scott began an examination of pre-hispanic sources for the study of Philippine history. Scott eventually demonstrated that the code was a forgery committed by Marco. When Scott presented these conclusions in his doctoral dissertation, defended on 16 June 1968 before a panel of eminent Filipino historians which included Teodoro Agoncillo, Horacio de la Costa, Marcelino Foronda, Mercedes Grau Santamaria, Nicolas Zafra and Gregorio Zaide, not a single question was raised about the chapter which he had called The Contributions of Jose E. Marco to Philippine historiography. However, in 1971 a decoration to be known as the Order of Kalantiao was created, to be awarded to any citizen of the Philippines for exceptional and meritorious services to the Republic in the administration of justice and in the field of law.

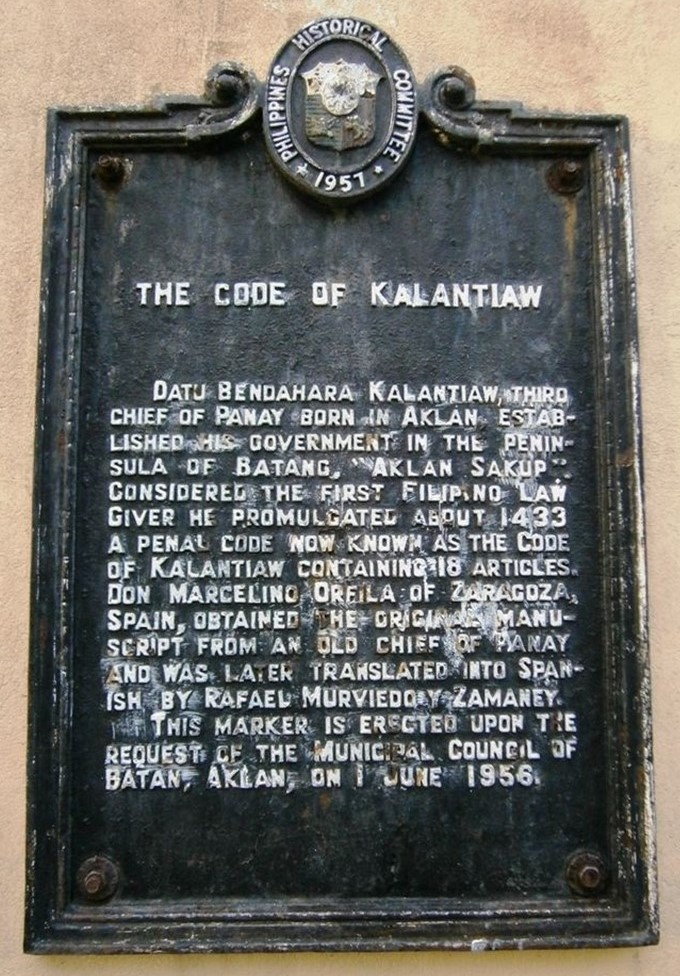
The now delisted 1957 national historical marker for the code installed in Batan, Aklan

Scott later published his findings debunking the code in his book Prehispanic Source Materials for the Study of Philippine History. Filipino historians later removed the code from future literature regarding Philippine history. When Antonio M. Molina published a Spanish version of his The Philippines Through the Centuries as Historia de Filipinas (Madrid, 1984), he replaced the Code with one sentence: La tesis doctoral del historador Scott desbarata la existencia misma de dicho Código. ("The doctoral dissertation of the historian Scott demolishes the very existence of the Code").

The authenticity of the code had been questioned previously by other scholars, (Note: e.g., in the 1950s and in 1968 by Mauro Garcia, a bibliographer and prominent Filipino scholar on ancient Philippine history, and by others.) However, despite this and despite Scott's findings, changes in textbooks and in academic curriculum were not forthcoming until almost thirty years following the release of Scott's publication in 1969. In the interim, the Code of Kalantiaw continued to be taught as a part of ancient Philippine history.

In 2004, National Historical Institute (NHI) Resolution No. 12 "[declaring that Code of Kalantiao/Kalantiaw has no valid historical basis" called for: (1) the official affirmation that the Kalantiaw Code is a twentieth-century fraudulent work by Jose Marco, (2) the President of the Philippines cease to honor retiring Supreme justices and other international dignitaries with the ‘Order of Kalantiaw’, and (3) the revoking of Executive Order 234, which recognized Datu Bondahara Kalantiaw as "The First Philippine Lawgiver" and declared a Hall of Fame and Library to be constructed in his honor in Batan, Aklan as a national shrine. This NHI resolution was approved by the Office of the President in 2005.

== Laws of the Kalantiaw Code ==
In his book, Struggle for Freedom (2008), Cecilio Duka provides a full reproduction of the code for the reader's "critical examination... to decide on its veracity and accuracy".

Article I

Ye shall not kill, neither shall ye steal nor shall ye hurt the aged, lest ye incur the danger of death. All those who this order shall infringe shall be tied to a stone and drowned in a river or in boiling water.

Article II

Ye shall punctually meet your debt with your headman. He who fulfils not, for the first time shall be lashed a hundredfold, and If the obligation is great, his hand shall be dipped threefold in boiling water. On conviction, he shall be flogged to death.

Article III

Obey ye: no one shall have wives that are too young, nor shall they be more than what he can take care of, nor spend much luxury. He who fulfils not, obeys not, shall be condemned to swim three hours and, for the second time, shall be scourged with spines to death.

Article IV

Observe and obey ye: Let not the peace of the graves be disturbed; due respect must be accorded them on passing by caves and trees where they are. He who observes not shall die by bites of ants or shall be flogged with spines till death.

Article V

Obey ye: Exchange in food must be carried out faithfully. He who complies not shall be lashed for an hour. He who repeats the act shall, for a day be exposed to the ants.

Article VI

Ye shall revere respectable places, trees of known value, and other sites. He shall pay a month's work, in gold or money, whoever fails to do this; and if twice committed, he shall be declared a slave.

Article VII

They shall die who kill trees of venerable aspect; who at night shoot with arrows the aged men and the women; he who enters the house of the headman without permission; he who kills a fish or shark or striped crocodile.

Article VIII

They shall be slaves for a given time who steal away the women of the headmen; he who possesses dogs that bite the headmen; he who burns another man's sown field.

Article IX

They shall be slaves for a given time, who sing in their night errands, kill manual birds, tear documents belonging to the headmen; who are evil-minded liars; who play with the dead.

Article X

It shall be the obligation of every mother to show her daughter secretly the things that are lascivious, and prepare them for womanhood; men shall not be cruel to their wives, nor should they punish them when they catch them in the act of adultery. He who disobeys shall be torn to pieces and thrown to the caymans.

Article XI

They shall be burned, who by force or cunning have mocked at and eluded punishment, or who have killed two young boys, or shall try to steal the women of the old men (agurangs).

Article XII

They shall be drowned, all slaves who assault their superiors or their lords and masters; all those who abuse their luxury; those who kill their anitos by breaking them or throwing them away.

Article XIII

They shall be exposed to the ants for half a day, who kill a black cat during the new moon or steal things belonging to the headmen.

Article XIV

They shall be slaves for life, who having beautiful daughters shall deny them to the sons of the headman, or shall hide them in bad faith.

Article XV

Concerning their beliefs and superstitions: they shall be scourged, who eat bad meat of respected insects or herbs that are supposed to be good; who hurt or kill the young manual bird and the white monkey.

Article XVI

Their fingers shall be cut off, who break wooden or clay idols in their olangangs and places of oblation; he who breaks Tagalan's daggers for hog killing, or breaks drinking vases.

Article XVII

They shall be killed, who profane places where sacred objects of their diwatas or headmen are buried. He who gives way to the call of nature at such places shall be burned.

Article XVIII

Those who do not cause these rules to be observed, if they are headmen, shall be stoned and crushed to death, and if they are old men, shall be placed in rivers to be eaten by sharks and crocodiles.

== See also ==
- Sharia law
- Code of Hammurabi
- Sa Aking Mga Kabata
