= De Película (disambiguation) =

De Película is a Mexican 24-hour cable television movie channel owned by Televisa.

De Película (Spanish, informally: like a movie) may also refer to:

- De Película Clásico, dedicated to broadcasting movies of the 1930s, 1940s and 1950s and some movies from the 1960s.
- De Película (Gloria Trevi album), 2013, or its title song
- De Película, a 1982 album by Johnny Pacheco
- De Película, a 2002 album by Miliki
- De Película, a 1991 album by Los Tigres del Norte
- De Película, a 1995 film starring Los Tucanes de Tijuana

== See also ==
- Pelicula (Film Festival)
