= La Loba Negra =

Opera by Francisco Feliciano

- Opera by Francisco Feliciano
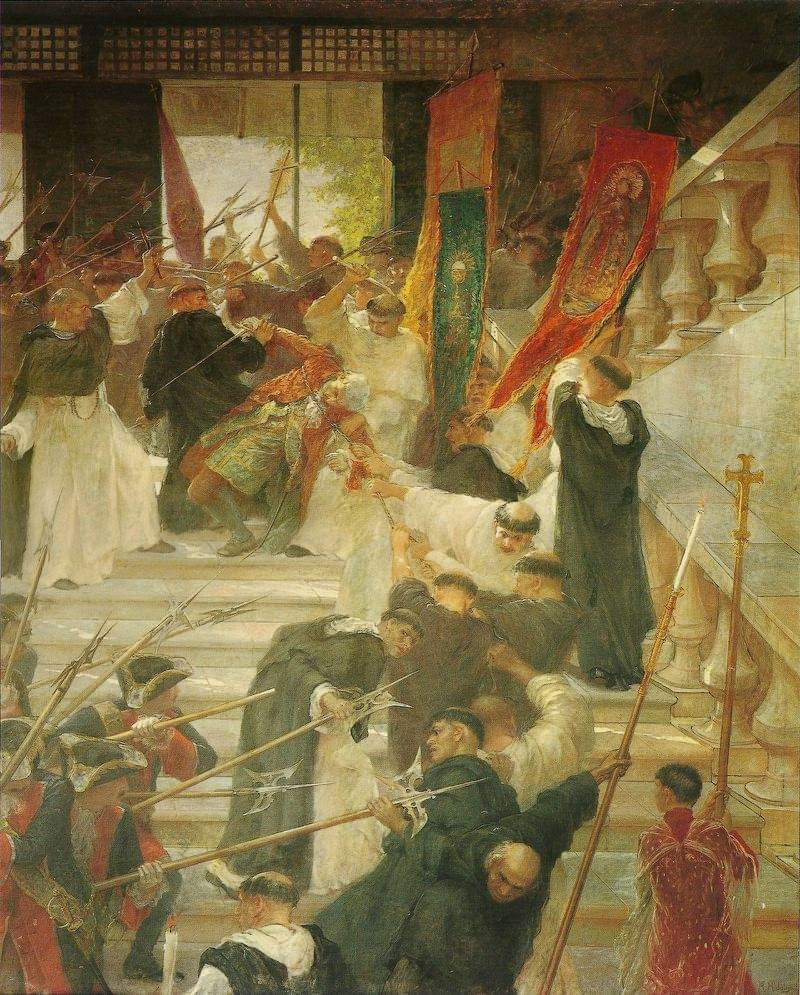
- A painting by Felix Hidalgo depicting the assassination of Bustamante
- Librettist: Fides Cuyugan-Asensio
- Language: Tagalog
- Premiere: 16 August 1984; Cultural Center of the Philippines Main Theater, Manila

La Loba Negra (The Black She-wolf) is an opera in 3 acts by Francisco Feliciano with libretto by Fides Cuyugan-Asensio. The opera was based on a novel attributed to Jose Burgos, but was proven to be a hoax made by Jose E. Marco. The opera tells of the story of the Governor-General Francisco Bustamante and his subsequent assassination and the revenge of his wife Luisa, now called La Loba Negra, after the death of her husband.

The laloba negra is the music was written in a vibrant expressionist style, contains violent contrasts in pitch and instrumentation, rapidly shifting keys and meters, and vivid orchestral color, as heard in eerie wolf calls and forest sounds. The work was premiered in 1984 at the Cultural Center of the Philippines, with the Philippine Philharmonic Orchestra conducted by the composer. It was acclaimed by critics as an extraordinary work of the 1980s. The last production was in 1985, with the same cast and venue. Occasionally, excerpts of the opera were performed. Luisa's aria "Napakahaba na ng Gabi" was sung at the composer's funeral.

== Roles ==
Role	Voice type	Premiere cast, 16 August 1984 Conductor: Francisco Feliciano
Francisco Bustamante	tenor	Jimmy Melendres
Luisa/La Loba Negra	soprano	Fides Cuyugan-Asensio
Dolores/Florentina	soprano	
Fray Sebastian de Totanes	bass	

== Synopsis ==
=== Prologue - A forest ===
The opera begins with a divine prefiguration, menacing figure of a woman dancing about a priest tied to a log, She goes into a frenzy as she castigates the priest. Amidst pitch darkness interspersed with various forest sounds, a loud howling "wolf-sound" is heard.

=== Act 1 ===
==== Scene 1 - Palace's Ballroom. ====
A ball in honor of the new Spanish Governor-General of the Philippines, Fernando Miguel Bustamante is in progress. The guests assembled have come to the palace to offer gifts of welcome. To their consternation, he responds to their chorus of "Viva El Rey, Viva España, Viva El Governador Bustamante" with a harangue against lavishness and ostentation as well as bribery which he says could only lead to corruption. He reminds the people of the glory that is Spain and tells them to keep the trust of King Felipe V. The entrance of Fray Totanes posturing elicit sarcastic remarks from the governor causing embarrassment to the governor's wife, Luisa. They exit, hailing the King and Spain.

A minor disturbance is caused by the entrance by Macatangay, an Indio servant, with message to the governor from his employer, Auditor General Torralba.

Fray Totanes now holds court with the exit of the Governor. Known as the Friar King, Totanes grabs the chance to assert the church's power over the state, prompting Dolores, the Governor's daughter, to chide the Friar for speaking thus in her father's palace. Totanes parries her accusation with a lascivious gesture of apology. Dolores exits, followed by an interested young friar. Totanes accepts all the gifts meant for the Governor to augment the church's treasury. Dona Luisa reappears on the scene bothered her daughter is nowhere to be found. The curtain falls on Fray Totanes, blessing the guests, reassuring them of a place in heaven.

==== Scene 2 - Palace's Family Room ====
Scene 2 opens with Luisa singing a lullaby, "Huitzilipochtli" accompanying herself on the harpsichord. Dolores, embroidering nearby, listens distractedly. She parries questions from Luisa with her own questions about the subject of the lullaby. Luisa has very grave suspicions about Dolores' state of mind but is distracted by the governor's entrance, on his way to investigate the state of the King's treasury at Auditor General's Torralba's office.

==== Scene 3 - Auditor-General's office ====
Friar Totanes was in full view and hearing of Auditor Torralba exacting their share of taxes from the various merchants gathered to get their trade permits. After sharing the "loot", Totanes gives Conchita, his mistress, her share. Bustamante enters and demands to know the state of the King's Treasury in the colony. The confrontation lasts a few minutes, whereupon Bustamante discovers an empty treasury and orders the immediate incarceration of Torralba at Fort Santiago - the dreaded jail for political prisoners and criminals at the time. Torralba is in shame and remorse while Bustamante in pity and disgust over what has come to pass in his beloved King's colony.

=== Act 2 ===
==== Scene 1 - Town Plaza ====
A religious demonstration procession is in progress against the injustices imposed by the new governor who has ordered various state and religious officials, including the Archbishop of Manila, jailed in Fort Santiago for offenses against the King of Spain. The demonstration is dispelled by the Governor's soldiers. But after the departure of the Governor's messengers and soldiers, the crowd resumes the invocations to the Saints to free the prisoners.

==== Scene 2 - Cathedral Interior ====
The priests are now out in full-force to plot the extermination of their most hated enemy: Governor-General Bustamante. Amidst a backdrop of evil conspiracy in a "Mass" without a service, where the altar was a symbolic coffin covered by a black cloth, draped with a Spanish flag topped by a huge crucifix, Fray Totanes exhorts the gathered hooded priests to rid the community of Bustamante, be it by sword or by poison. "Muerte, Muerte Para El Traidor Bustamante" (Death, death to the traitor Bustamante) is chanted by priests as they exit on their way to the governor's office.

==== Scene 3 - Palace's Living Room ====
Bustamante is getting ready for an early mass. Before they leave, a messenger comes to warn of the Governor of the impending assassination plot. Bustamante tells Luisa about their situation as the assassins close in on the palace. Luisa witnesses the brutal killing of her son Jose and her husband Fernando. As she prays to Jesus Christ and the Virgin Mary asking for redress of the crime committed on her loved ones, her mind snaps. She evokes the Aztec god Huitzilipochtli to assist her in avenging the killings that have taken place. With inhuman scream of pain, she rejects her Christian background.

=== Act 3 ===
==== Scene 1 - Church Interior ====
Luisa, now the La Loba Negra, commences on her avenging mission amidst elaborate Palm Sunday rituals.

==== Scene 2 - Town Plaza ====
La Loba Negra's fame has spread for and wide. Both clergy and lay people live in daily fear of where she will strike next. Conchita, in mourning attire, was mistaken for La Loba by Padre Sevilla, a new Friar. He tries to kill her but other friars come to her rescue laughing at Padre Sevilla. Luisa, watching the scene, moves together with Dolores (now called Florentina), to begin yet another orgy of killing friars. Unknown to her, Macatangay, now a rebel leader, is also on the scene with his band of followers. Macatangay and Luisa meet. Upon hearing of the reason of Luisa's legendary massacre of priests of her own race, he asks a plea to Luisa for her to join him not to avenge her husband and son's assassination but to free the country of its oppressors. Enlightened, Luisa joins forces with them.

==== Scene 3 - Mountain Hideout ====
The scene is carried back to the Prologue with Luisa castigating the Friar responsible for her daughter's seduction and rape. All emotions of revenge for revenge's sake has been purged out of Luisa - she is now one with the indios of her adopted country.

The wedding of her daughter to Sandugo ensures her and Macatangay's mission in life - and death.

Before Luisa dies, she speaks of a bright tomorrow after the long night, "Napakahaba na ng Gabi" (The Night is so long) her spirit lives on in "Sulong, Mahal kong Kababayan" (Advance, my beloved countrymen) sung by the entire chorus.
