= UP Cineastes' Studio =

Filipino student film organization

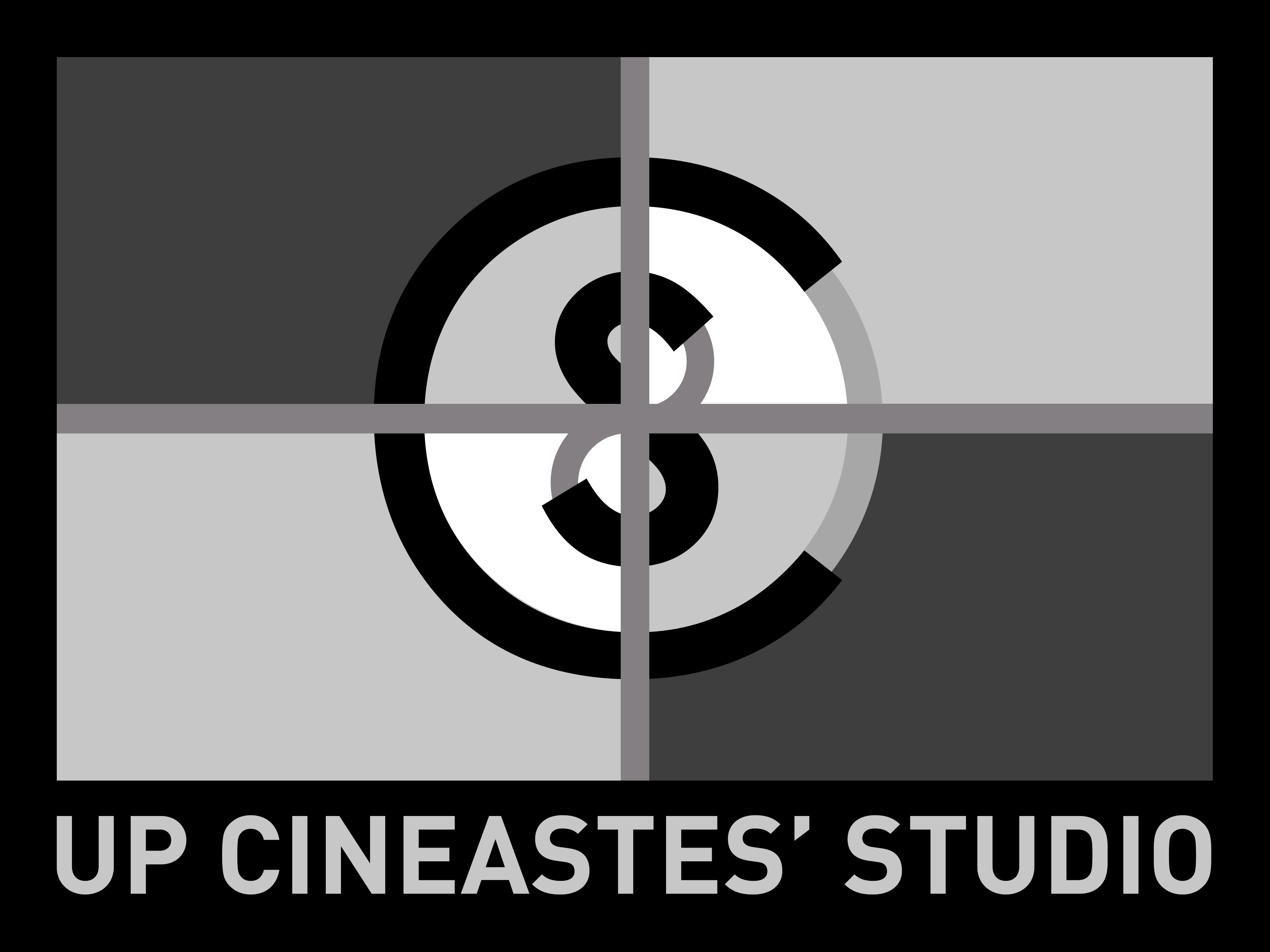
- Founded: September 24, 1984; 41 years ago
- Founded at: UP College of Mass Communication
- Type: Student organization
- Legal status: Active
- Purpose: Film studies
- Headquarters: UP Film Institute Media Center, College of Mass Communication, UP Diliman
- Location: Quezon City, Philippines
- Publication: Splice Magazine
- Website: www.facebook.com/upcineastes

The University of the Philippines Cineastes' Studio, commonly known as UP Cineastes' Studio or UP Cineastes, is a student film organization based at the UP Film Institute, University of the Philippines Diliman, that promotes independent Filipino cinema. Membership in UP Cineastes' Studio is open to students of the University of the Philippines Diliman.

== History ==
U.P. Cineastes' Studio is a film organization for students in the Philippines. It was established on September 24, 1984, predating the film department of the UP College of Mass Communication. Initially formed for film students at the University of the Philippines Diliman, it later expanded to include students from other colleges.

The organization has hosted the university branches of Filipino independent film festivals such as the Cinemalaya Independent Film Festival, Cinema One Originals, QCinema, and in 2023, the CineFilipino Film Festival.

The organization has also participated in smaller film competitions sponsored by companies like Maynilad Water Services and Hyundai. Through its flagship event, Cineastes Presents, the organization helps premiere and screen independent films such as Zombadings 1: Patayin sa Shokot si Remington, Citizen Jake, Signal Rock, ICYMI: I See Me, and Kuwaresma.

=== Notable members of UP Cineastes ===
Former members of UP Cineastes include Cathy Garcia-Molina, Kim Atienza, Christine Bersola-Babao, Ely Buendia, Jade Castro, Petersen Vargas and Carlo Francisco Manatad.
