= Nicanor Tiongson =

Filipino cultural scholar and National Artist (born 1946)

- Born: Nicanor G. Tiongson; January 10, 1946 (age 80)
- Education: Ateneo de Manila University (Bachelor of Humanities); University of the Philippines Diliman (MA, PhD)
- Occupations: Cultural scholar, critic, playwright, editor, educator, arts administrator
- Writing career
- Notable works: Pilipinas Circa 1907; The Women of Malolos; The Cinema of Manuel Conde; CCP Encyclopedia of Philippine Art
- Notable awards: Grant Goodman Prize (2015); Order of National Artists of the Philippines (2026)

Nicanor G. Tiongson (born January 10, 1946), also known as Nic Tiongson, is a Filipino cultural scholar, critic, playwright, editor, educator and arts administrator. His work encompasses Philippine theatre, cinema, literature and popular culture, with particular emphasis on traditional dramatic forms such as the komedya, sinakulo and sarsuwela.

Tiongson served as vice-president and artistic director of the Cultural Center of the Philippines (CCP) from 1986 to 1994 and as dean of the University of the Philippines College of Mass Communication from 2003 to 2006. He is a professor emeritus of the University of the Philippines Film Institute, a founding member and former chair of the Manunuri ng Pelikulang Pilipino, and a co-founder of the Cinemalaya Philippine Independent Film Festival.

In September 2026, President Bongbong Marcos proclaimed Tiongson a National Artist of the Philippines for Literature through Proclamation No. 1414, series of 2026.

== Early life and education ==
Tiongson was born on January 10, 1946. He grew up in Malolos, Bulacan, whose history, religious observances and community performance traditions subsequently became important subjects of his scholarship and creative work.

He earned a Bachelor of Humanities degree from the Ateneo de Manila University. He later completed master's and doctoral degrees in Philippine Studies at the University of the Philippines Diliman.

== Academic and cultural scholarship ==
Tiongson began his scholarly career during the late 1960s, when Philippine Studies scholars were seeking approaches grounded in the country's own historical and cultural experience. His early research examined popular and community-based theatre forms which had often been dismissed as unsophisticated or treated principally as derivatives of European traditions.

His early publications included Kasaysayan at Estetika ng Sinakulo at Ibang Dulang Panrelihiyon sa Malolos (1975) and Kasaysayan ng Komedya sa Pilipinas: 1766–1982 (1982). Through historical documentation and aesthetic analysis, these studies examined the development and local transformation of Philippine religious and secular theatre.

Tiongson later directed or contributed to several large documentation projects. These included Tuklas Sining, a series of videos and monographs on Philippine art, and the four-volume Urian Anthology, which collected articles, reviews and interviews produced by members of the Manunuri ng Pelikulang Pilipino.

Other studies included The Women of Malolos (2004), a historical account of the women praised by José Rizal in his 1889 letter, and The Cinema of Manuel Conde (2008), a study of filmmaker Manuel Conde.

Tiongson taught Philippine literature, theatre, film and culture at the University of the Philippines. He became professor emeritus at the UP Film Institute and served as dean of the university's College of Mass Communication from 2003 to 2006.

== Film criticism ==
On May 1, 1976, Tiongson joined nine other critics, writers and scholars in founding the Manunuri ng Pelikulang Pilipino. The organization established the Gawad Urian Awards and sought to promote sustained critical assessment of Philippine cinema. Tiongson subsequently served as the organization's chairperson.

He edited four volumes of The Urian Anthology, covering film criticism, interviews and documentation concerning Philippine cinema from the 1970s through the 2000s. In 2005, he became one of the founders of the Cinemalaya Foundation and the Cinemalaya Philippine Independent Film Festival.

== Theatre and dramatic works ==
Tiongson's best-known theatrical work is Pilipinas Circa 1907, a contemporary sarsuwela based on Severino Reyes's Filipinas para los Filipinos. Set during the early years of American colonial rule, the play examines political, economic and cultural conflicts within Filipino society.

His other theatrical works draw on Philippine history and Asian epics. Realizing Rama uses the Ramayana to explore questions of leadership, while Labaw Donggon, Ang Banog ng Sanlibutan draws from the epic traditions of the Panay Bukidnon. The musical Mabining Mandirigma portrays Apolinario Mabini and his conflicts with colonial authorities and members of the Filipino political elite.

In 2024, the Ateneo de Manila University Press published two volumes of Tiongson's collected plays and a three-volume collection of his essays on Philippine theatre history, traditions, aesthetics and criticism.

== Cultural administration ==
Following the end of the Marcos administration, Tiongson became vice-president and artistic director of the Cultural Center of the Philippines. From 1986 to 1994, he participated in efforts to make the institution's programmes more accessible outside Metro Manila and to give greater representation to regional and community-based arts.

Tiongson initiated and served as editor-in-chief of the ten-volume first edition of the CCP Encyclopedia of Philippine Art, published in 1994. The encyclopedia documented Philippine peoples, architecture, visual arts, film, music, dance, theatre, broadcast arts and literature.

In 2005, the CCP asked Tiongson to assemble scholars and artists to evaluate and revise the encyclopedia. He later headed the expanded second edition, for which research and production were undertaken from 2013 to 2017. The second edition appeared in print and digital formats.

In 2001, Tiongson briefly served as chairperson of the Movie and Television Review and Classification Board. He resigned during the controversy over the government's suspension of the theatrical exhibition of Live Show, which the board had previously allowed subject to classification. Tiongson said that his resignation concerned the independence of the board's decisions and the effect of political and religious pressure on film classification.

== Selected works ==
=== Scholarship and criticism ===
- Kasaysayan at Estetika ng Sinakulo at Ibang Dulang Panrelihiyon sa Malolos (1975)
- Kasaysayan ng Komedya sa Pilipinas: 1766–1982 (1982)
- Philippine Theatre: History and Anthology (1999)
- The Women of Malolos (2004)
- The Cinema of Manuel Conde (2008)
- Philippine Theater: Collected Essays, three volumes (2024)
- Manong: The Life and Works of Gerardo de Leon (2025)

=== Plays and librettos ===
- Pilipinas Circa 1907
- Basilia ng Malolos
- Noli at Fili Dekada 2000
- Realizing Rama
- Labaw Donggon, Ang Banog ng Sanlibutan
- Mabining Mandirigma

=== Editorial works ===
- The Urian Anthology, four volumes
- CCP Encyclopedia of Philippine Art, first and second editions

== Awards and recognition ==
Year	Award	Citation
2015	Grant Goodman Prize	Awarded by the Philippine Studies Group of the Association for Asian Studies for contributions to Philippine historical studies
2026	Order of National Artists of the Philippines	Literature
