= Joel David =

Joel David is a Filipino film critic and Philippine cinema academic best known for authoring numerous books on the topic of Philippine cinema, including the seminal works "The national pastime: Contemporary Philippine cinema" (1990) and "The national pastime: Contemporary Philippine cinema" (1998). David is a Glory awardee for “film research and criticism,” and played a significant role in the formation of the UP Film Institute.

David was the Philippines' first graduate of a bachelor's degree in film.
