= Pelicula =

Annual Spanish film festival held in the Philippines

Manila Spanish Film Festival (Festival de Cine Manila)
- Location: Metro Manila, Philippines
- Founded: 2002
- Festival date: October 4–11, 2026
- Language: Spanish

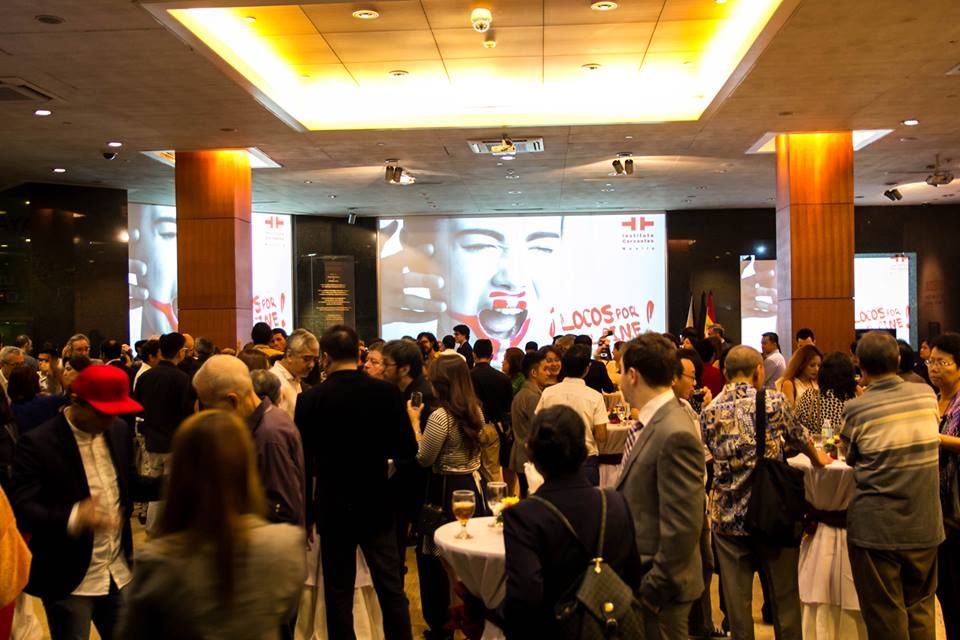
Opening Película

Película (stylized as PELICULA>PELIKULA) is a Spanish film festival held in Manila every October by the Instituto Cervantes de Manila, in collaboration with the Embassy of Spain to the Philippines. Created in 2002, this event shows award-winning Spanish and Latin American films.

Due to the Película's yearly success, the festival made big changes during its eighth season in 2009. The duration of the festival was lengthened, and the number of venues was increased from one to three venues to accommodate more films. The festival's venues include the Cultural Center of the Philippines (CCP), Greenbelt Cinemas, and the De La Salle- College of Saint Benilde School of Design and Arts.

== Activities ==
Manila Spanish Film Festival 2026 in Power Plant Cinema in Makati

Aside from film screenings, supplementary cultural events were also organized based on the yearly theme of the festival. Photographic exhibits, cinema workshops, music and dance performances add color to the film festival. These events do not only showcase the classical and contemporary Spanish culture to the Filipinos, but they also create a bridge between the Filipino and Spanish cultures. Past events include Oscar F. Orengo's photographic exhibit of portraits of fort-four of the Philippines' greatest film directors, seminars on film directing by Max Lemcke and Oscar Cardenas, and performances by Spain's leading vertical dance company called B612, award-winning flamenco guitarist Oscar Herrero, and piano and violin duet named Duo Rivera, just to name a few.

== Featured films ==
The Spanish Film Festival held annually in the Philippines each October showcases a diverse selection of contemporary Spanish and Latin American films, celebrating the richness of Spanish cinema and culture. The festival features a wide range of genres, from dramas and comedies to documentaries and short films, highlighting the work of prominent and emerging filmmakers from Spain and the Spanish-speaking world.

Each year, the festival offers audiences the chance to experience both critically acclaimed and commercially successful films, often including award-winning titles from prestigious festivals such as Cannes, San Sebastián, and Goya Awards. Popular films from past editions have included:

Year	Seasons	List of featured films
2002	1	Bwana, El abuelo, Goya en Burdeos, La ardilla roja, Retrato de mujer con hombre al fondo, Solas, Tesis
2003	2	El Bola, En construcción, El último viaje de Robert Rylands, It's for you, La comunidad, Martin (Hache), Silvia Prieto, Sin verguenza
2004	3	800 Balas, Ana y los otros, Días de fútbol, El caballero Don Quijote, El juego de la silla, En la ciudad, En la ciudad sin limites, El viaje de Carol, Historias minimas, La caja 507, El otro lado de la cama, La primera noche, Smoking_room, Suite Habana
2005	4	Abre los ojos, Astronautas, Barrio, Ferpect crime, Dias contados, El abrazo partido, El Bola, El bosque animado, El juego de la verdad, Extranjeras, Hector, Intacto, La buena estrella, La flaqueza del bolchevique, La ley de Herodes, Los lunes al sol, Mar adentro, Nadie hablará de nosotras cuando hayamos muerto, Noviembre, Planta cuarta, Sodlados de Salamina, Subterra, Take my eyes, Tesis, All about my mother, Torremolinos 73
2006	5	Amor idiota, El abuelo, El calentito, El método, El milagro de candeal, Elsa & Fred, El séptimo día, Frio sol de invierno, Historia de un beso, Iberia, Machuca, Ninette, No sos vos soy yo, Perder es cuestion del método, Piedras, Princesas, Round two, Seres queridos, Tapas, Tiovivo C. 1950, My quick way out, You're the one
2007	6	7 Virgenes, Azul oscuro casi negro, Ciudad en celo, De profundis, Derecho de familia, El aura, El próximo Oriente, El sueño de una noche de San Juan, Habana Blues, Iluminados por el fuego, Invisibles, La noche de los girasoles, La educación de las hadas, La vida secreta de las palabras, Los últimos de Filipinas, Otros días vendrán, Salvador, Semen, Utopía, Viva Cuba!, You're life in 65
2008	7	Bajo las estrellas, Concursante, El pollo, el pez y el cangrejo real, El violín, Fados, Fuera de carta, La Caja, La torre de Suso, Lo mejor de mi, Luz silenciosa, Mataharis, Miguel y William, Nocturna, El Orfanato, Siete mesas de billar francés, The Oxford murders, Todos estamos invitados, Yo soy la Juani
2009	8	El lince perdido, El sueño de una noche de San Juan, La zona, Forasters, Una palabra tuya, Los girasoles ciegos, Casual day, 53 días de Invierno, El truco de Manco, Caótica Ana, La buena nueva, La buena vida, Retorno a Hansala, Chuecatown, No me pidas que te bese porque te besaré, El nido vacio, Solo quiero caminar, Dieta mediterranea, Audience choice, 14 kilómetros, Los cronocrimenes, 3 días, Tamaraw Quest, Medalawna, Lucio, Bucarest, Walai, Ang Pasko ni Intoy, Cine > Sine, Flores de Luna, Syokoy, Imelda, Walking the waking journey, Tapologo, The last journey of Ninoy, Extranjeras, Rabia, El Baño del Papa, Parpados azules, La punta del diablo, Una novia errante, Astronautas, Los amantes del circulo polar, Amanece, que no es poco, Los santos inocentes, Bienvenido, Mr. Marshall, Viridiana, El espíritu de la colmena, Átame, Astronautas
2010	9	Bolívia, Cachimba, Luna de Avellaneda, El cielo abierto, El secreto de sus ojos, Lo que sé de Lola, Garbo: the spy, happyland, Ich Bin Enric Marco, La leyenda del tiempo, La mujer sin piano, El chacotero sentimental, Los condenados, Manolito Gafotas, Nacidas para sufrir, Otilia Rauda, que Se mueren los feos, rencor, tres días con la familia, Celda 211, Desierto adentro, La teta asustada, Pantaleón y las visitadoras
2011	10	El secreto de sus ojos, Mar adentro, Fuera de carta, Lope, La zona, La vergüenza, Mal día para pescar, Buried, Mil cretinos, La vida secreta de las palabras, En la ciudad sin límites, The Great Vazquez, Gordos, Primos, Todas las canciones hablan de mí, Bíutiful, Yo también, Elsa y Fred, También la lluvia, Amador, Viridiana, Chico y Rita, Morirse está en hebreo, Buenas noches España, Habitación en Roma, Didí Hollywood
2012	11	Donde el olor del mar no llega, Un cuento chino, Dos hermanos, Arrugas, No habrá paz para los malvados, Grupo 7, After, Mientras duermes, Katmandú, Madrid, 1987, Lo mejor de Eva, Pa negre, La chispa de la vida, 5 metros cuadrados, 18 comidas, 80 egunean, María y yo, Hollywood Talkies, Jacques Leonard, el payo Chac
2013	12	Blancanieves, El artista y la modelo, La maleta mexicana, De tu ventana a la mía, Colgados de un sueño, ¡Atraco!, O Apostolo, A puerta fría, Promoción fantasma, Extraterrestre, Copito de nieve, Días de vinilo, Samurai, Días de pesca en Patagonia, La última película, Aquel no era yo, Cortos de Zamboanga, Cortos valencianos
2014	13	10.000 noches en ninguna parte, 2 francos, 40 pesetas, Azul intangible, Bertsolari, Bypass, Caníbal, Espantapájaros, Implacable, La cebra, La gran familia española, La revolución de Juan Escopeta, La vida inesperada, Las aventuras de Tadeo Jones, Las brujas de Zugarramurdi, Madrid, 1987, Mapa, Soldados de Salamina, Todas las mujeres, Vivir es fácil con los ojos cerrados, A political story, Cólera, Democracia, Hotzanak, for your own safety, Zela Trovke
2015	14	Stockholm, Negociador, La isla mínima, Paco de Lucía: La búsqueda, Tres bodas de más, La plaga, Loreak, Hermosa juventud, Ocho apellidos vascos, Ártico, El árbol magnético, Todos están muertos, Cortos de España, Aquellas palabras, De aliados a masacrados, Relatos salvajes, Gente en sitios, Milagro en Praga, El resto del mundo
2016	15	A Esmorga, A Perfect Day to Fly, Azul y no tan rosa (My Straight Son), Cien años de perdón, El Rayo, Embrace of the Serpent, Isla Bonita, La Tropa de Trapo, Land and Shade, Much Ado about Nothing, My Big Night, Palm Trees in the Snow, Perdiendo el Norte, Sacromonte, los sabios de la tribu, Sidetracked, Techo y comida (Food and Shelter), The Clan, Truman
2017	16	Tarde de para la ira (The fury of a Patient Man), La noche que mi madre mato a mi padre (The Night My Mother Killed My Father), Al final del tunel (At the End of the Tunnel), La Propera pell (The Next Skin), El Bar (The Bar), El hombre de las mil caras (Smoke and Mirrors), La casa del fin de los tiempos (The House at the End of Time), La delgada linea amarilla (The Thin Yellow Line), La mano invisible (The Invisible Hand), Que Dios nos perdone (May God Save Us)
2018	17	Los Amores Cobardes, Campeones La Llamada Mi Querida Cofradía, Dancing Beethoven, Oro, Atrapa la Bandera, Memorias de un Hombre en Pijama, La Novia, The Summit, Últimos Días en La Habana, Encuentros en el Cine: Shorts from the Philippines and Spain, Wild Strawberries, Persona, Cría Cuervos, Tacones Lejanos (High Heels)
2019	18	El cuento de las comadrejas (The Weasels’ Tale), Mi obra maestra, El mejor verano de mi vida, El reino
2020	19	La Filla D'Algu, El Increible Menguante, Jaulas, El Despertar de las Hormigas. Suc de Sindria, El Cuadro, Mudar La Piel, Asamblea, Arima
2021	20	El Cover, A Este Lado del Mundo, Una Vez Mas, Lina de Lima, Observar las Aves, Invisibles, Tristesse, Oscuro y Lucientes, 15 Horas, Ane, Los Dias Azules
2022	21	El Buen Patron, Muerte De Un Ciclista, El Test, Con Quien Viajas, A Las Mujeres De España, Algo Azul, El Olvido Que Seremos, Maixabel, Sentimental, La Hija, Competencia Oficial, La Boda De Rosa, Jinetes Del Paraiso, Bertsolar!, Oreina, Muga Deitzen Da Pausoa, España La Primera Globalizacion, Sentimental, Handia, Rendir Los Machos
2023	22	1976, Alcarrás, Arquitectura emocional 1959, Cinco lobitos, El Beat, El cuarto pasajero, El Olivo, El rey de todo el mundo, Embrujo, Empieza el baile, Fonos, Girasoles silvestres, Goya en Burdeos, La consagración de la primavera, La vida padre, Llegaron de noche, Modelo 77, Tierra, Una vida no tan simple, Valentina, Hinakdal, Cría cuervos, También la lluvia, La española la de Torres, La flota de Indias, Velázquez el poder y el arte
2024	23	Robot Dreams, Cerrar los ojos, La estrella azul, Casa en flames, Loli Tormenta, Rioja: the Land of Thousand Wines, Hispanoamérica, canto de vida y esperanza, Puan, Pacarrete, Las hijas
2025	24	The 47, Alone in the Night, Dalia and the Red Book, Deaf, Queens, Tasio, Robots, Saturn Return, The Portuguese House, A Free Man, Breaking Walls, The Story of Us, Becho, Black Butterflies, For Your Sake, The Flamenco Guitar of Yerai Cortés, Until the Music is Over
2026	25	Giants of La Mancha, L’Olivia i el terratrèmol invisible, Mensaje en una botella, Mariposas negras, Rondallas, La cena, El cautivo, El desencanto, The Room Next Door, Maspalomas, Los domingos, Tengo sueños eléctricos, Vino la noche, Laponia, Cyclone, Sirāt, We the Hispanos, Los tigres

== Audience choice award ==
The Película Choice Award (Premio del publico), established in 2004, allows viewers to vote for their favorite film. Below is the list of films chosen as winners by the audience.

- 2004 Audience choice award En la ciudad sin límites (Antonio Hernández, 2003)
- 2005 Audience choice award Mar adentro (Alejandro Amenábar, 2004)
- 2006 Audience choice award Elsa y Fred (Marcos Carnevale, 2005)
- 2007 Audience choice award La vida secreta de las palabras (Isabel Coixet, 2005)
- 2008 Audience choice award Fuera de carta (Nacho G. Velilla, 2008)
- 2009 Audience choice award La zona (Rodrigo Plá, 2007)
- 2010 Audience choice award El secreto de sus ojos (Juan José Campanella, 2009)
- 2011 Audience choice award También la lluvia (Icíar Bollaín, 2010)
- 2012 Audience choice award Un cuento chino (Sebastián Borensztein, 2011)
- 2013 Audience choice award Días de vinilo (Gabriel Nesci, 2012)
- 2014 Audience choice award La gran familia española (Daniel Sánchez Arévalo, 2013)
- 2015 Audience choice award Relatos salvajes (Damián Szifron, 2014)
- 2016 Audience choice award Truman (Cesc Gay, 2015)
- 2017 Audience choice award Al final del túnel (Rodrigo Grande, 2016)
- 2018 Audience choice award Campeones (Javier Fesser, 2018)
- 2019 Audience choice award El cuento de las comadrejas (Juan José Campanella, 2019)
- 2020 Audience choice award El cuadro (Andrés Sanz, 2019)
- 2021 Audience choice award Antonio Machado. Los días azules (Laura Hojman, 2020)
- 2022 Audience choice award El olvido que seremos (Fernando Trueba, 2020)
- 2023 Audience choice award As Bestas (Rodrigo Sorogoyen, 2022)
- 2024 Audience choice award Casa en flames (Dani de la Orden, 2024)
- 2025 Audience choice award Una Quinta Portuguesa (Avelina Prat, 2025)
- 2026 Audience choice award Los Tigres (Alberto Rodríguez, 2025)

== Gallery ==
Some of the viewers during the 2026 Manila Spanish Film Festival in Makati

A box for submission of entries for audience choice award

The venue for showing films during the festival in 2026
