= William Henry Scott (historian) =

Filipino historian (1921–1993)

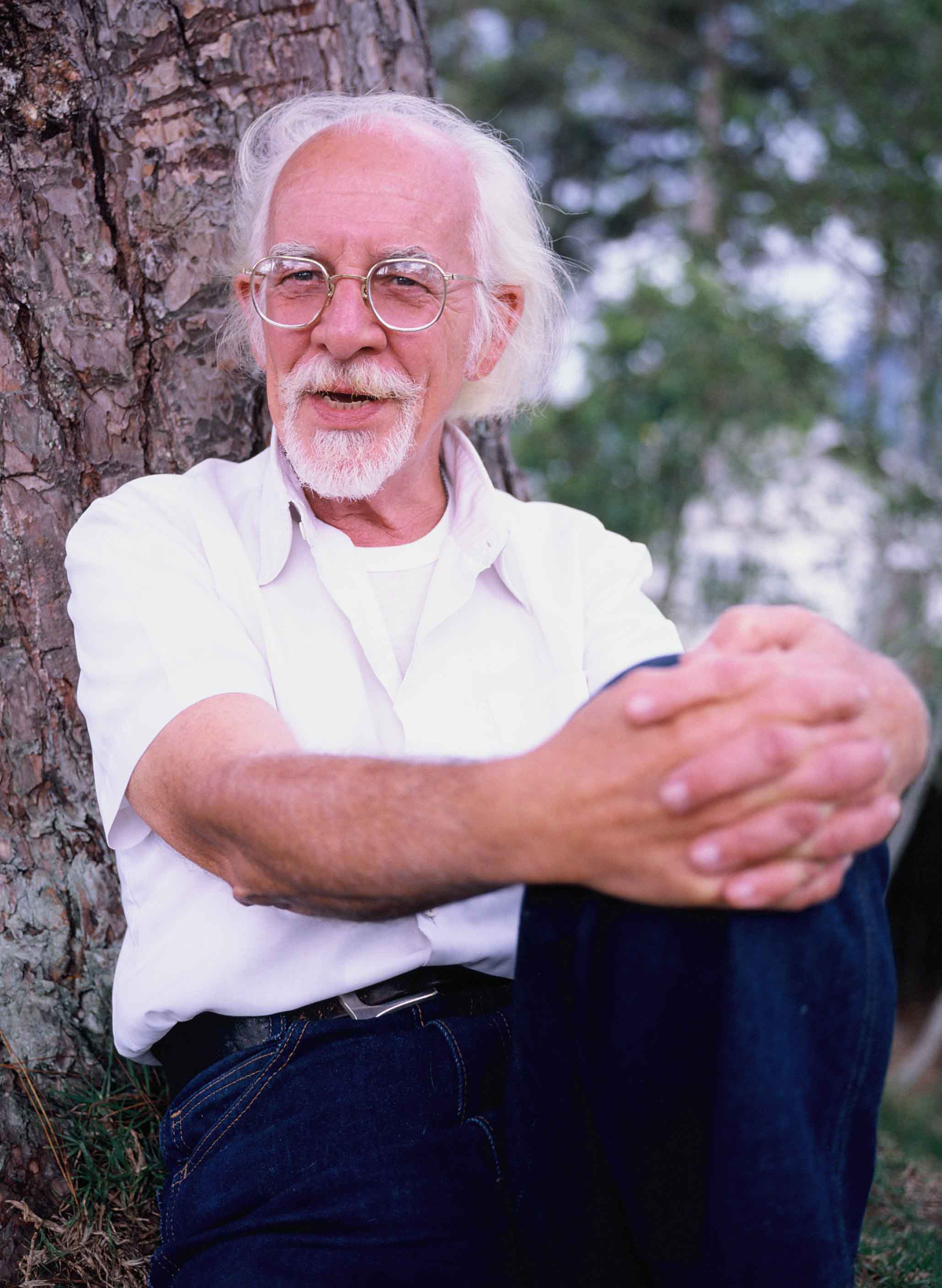
- Scott at Sagada (1989)
- Born: Henry King Ahrens; July 10, 1921; Detroit, Michigan, U.S.
- Died: October 4, 1993 (aged 72); Quezon City, Philippines
- Resting place: Saint Mary The Virgin Cemetery, Sagada, Mountain Province, Philippines
- Known for: Pre-colonial and colonial history of the Philippines

Academic background
- Education: Yale University (BA); Columbia University (MA); University of Santo Tomas (Ph.D.)
- Thesis: Critical Study of the Prehispanic Source Materials for the Study of Philippine History (1968)

William Henry Scott (born Henry King Ahrens; July 10, 1921 – October 4, 1993) was an American historian of the Cordillera Central and pre-Hispanic Philippines, ethnographer, and academic. He was known for his extensive research on Philippine history, indigenous cultures, and pre-colonial societies. A longtime resident of the Philippines, he dedicated much of his scholarship to studying the Igorot people and pre-Hispanic Filipino civilizations.

Scott authored several influential works that challenged colonial narratives and misconceptions about early Philippine societies, most notably Prehispanic Source Materials for the Study of Philippine History (1968), which critically examined Spanish-era documents and indigenous accounts. His research significantly contributed to the understanding of pre-colonial Philippine culture, trade, and governance.

His commitment to historical accuracy and indigenous perspectives earned him recognition as one of the leading historians of Philippine history.

== Early life ==
William Henry Scott was born on 10 July 1921, in Detroit, Michigan, where he was christened Henry King Ahrens. His family, of Dutch-Lutheran descent, soon returned to Bethlehem, Pennsylvania, where Scott spent his boyhood. In 1936, Scott won a three-year scholarship to the Episcopalian-affiliated Cranbrook School in Michigan, United States, where he excelled academically and became interested in pursuing a career as an archeologist. In 1939, after graduating, he changed his name to William Henry Scott. In 1942, Scott joined the US Navy, serving throughout World War II until 1946.

== Professional career ==
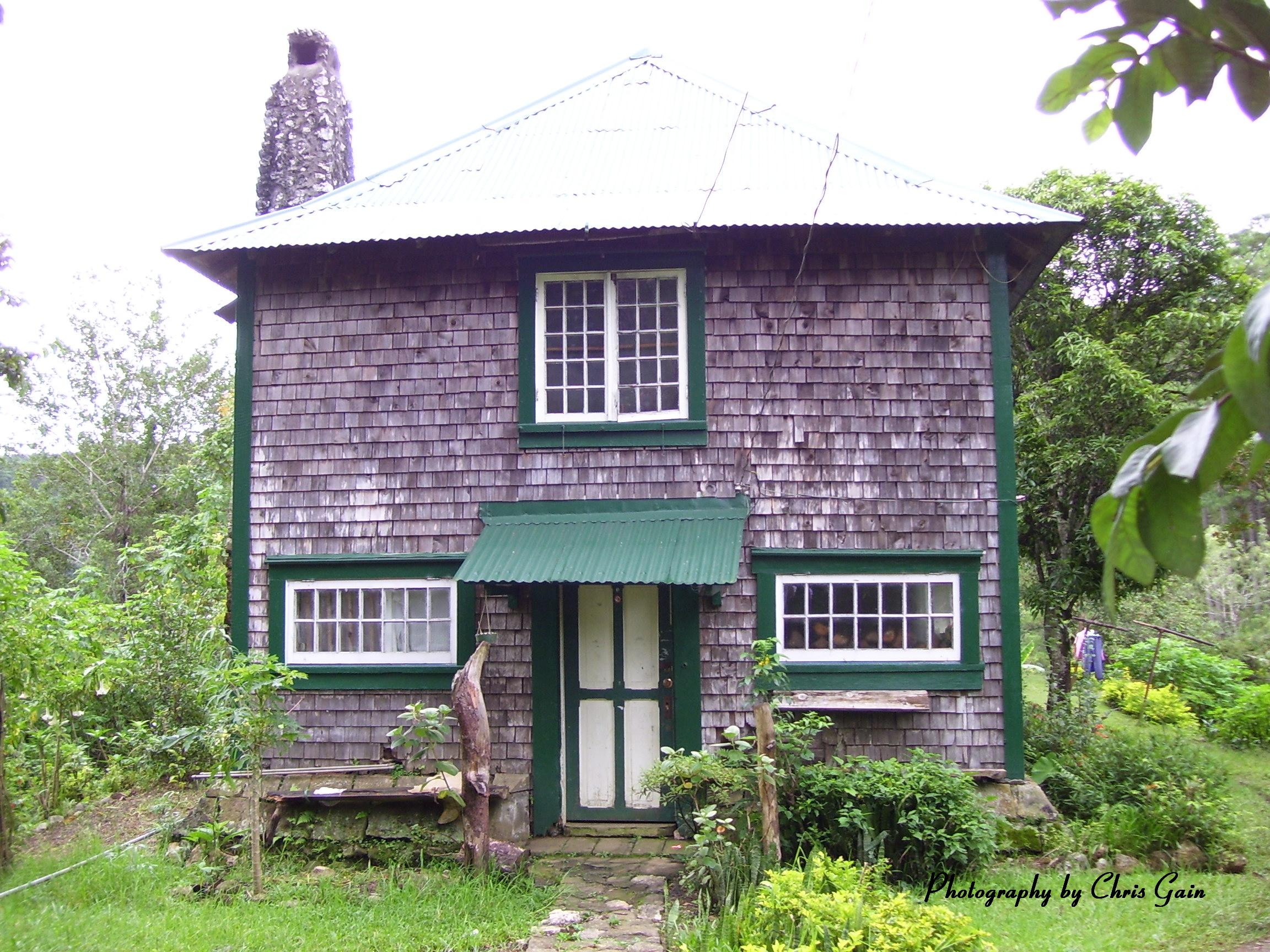
St. Mary's School, the Episcopalian Church's only Training School in the Philippines when Scott came to Sagada in the 1950s, pictured 2007

In 1946, Scott joined the Episcopal Church mission in China. He taught and studied in Shanghai, Yangzhou, and Beijing until 1949. With the general expulsion of foreigners from China in 1949, he followed some of his teachers to Yale University where he enrolled, graduating in 1951 with a Bachelor of Arts degree in Chinese language and literature. Immediately upon graduation he was recalled to active duty and served in the navy for eighteen months during the Korean War.

In 1953, he was appointed lay missionary in the Protestant Episcopal Church in the United States of America.

As the Episcopal Church became well established in the Cordillera mountain region of Northern Luzon during the US colonial period, it was here that Scott settled. He spent much of the remainder of his life in the Kankanaey town of Sagada, Mountain Province.

Although some of his most influential academic works—"Prehispanic Source Materials" and "Discovery of the Igorots"—are of particular interest to anthropologists, he personally rejected the description anthropologist as applying to himself.

Known to his friends as "Scotty", he became a focus for pilgrimage by numerous foreign and Filipino academics, entertaining them in his book-lined study while he puffed away on his trademark cigar.

The Igorot people came to think of Scott as one of their own, even eventually referring to him as "Lakay" (elder).

== Detention during martial law ==
Soon after Ferdinand Marcos declared martial law in 1972, Scott was arrested as a subversive and placed in military detention.

Because several of the boys Scott had taught and sponsored in the years he had lived in Sagada had joined the anti-Marcos opposition, Scott was accused of being a communist sympathizer. The government forces who had broken into his house and arrested him had also found copies of Mao's writings in his bookshelf, and cited this as "evidence" of his communist leanings. Colleague Stuart Schlagel recounts Scott's response:

"For heaven's sake, I teach Asian history, and anyone who does that must be familiar with Mao's work! It doesn't mean I have abandoned Christianity and democratic politics; it just means I am a historian practicing his trade."

Scott saw his time in Marcos' prison as a validation of his Filipino nationalist beliefs. Schlagel recounts Scott saying that he "considered the time in jail behind bars to be one of the best of his life, because he was able to have long in-depth conversations with all the most prominent anti-Marcos activists." He shared a cell with fellow historian Zeus Salazar, with whom he had many disagreements and arguments. Another notable fellow prisoner was a young Butch Dalisay, who is said to have put caricature versions of both Scott and Salazar in his book "Killing Time in a Warm Place."

As an American citizen Scott could have easily left the Philippines, but he declined, and so faced deportation proceedings. Marcos' outward commitment to legal formalities resulted in Scott being put on trial for subversion. In court, "resoundingly supported and defended by friends, students, and colleagues, and by Scott's own brilliant testimony", he was exonerated with the court dismissing the charges in 1973.

Scott was given "a memorable and triumphant welcome back in Sagada" following his acquittal. He continued to be critical of the Marcos regime. The high level of esteem in which he was held protected him from further prosecution, although his situation remained precarious until the lifting of martial law.

One particular article written by Scott, titled "The Igorot Defense of Northern Luzon" first published in May 1970, was often tagged by the dictatorship's military forces as "subversive," although it was actually about incidents which took place from 1576 to 1896, the Spanish colonial era. It was even cited as "subversive material" during the trial of Father Jeremias Aquino. Of this common error by the military, Scott remarked: "Since nobody who ever read the article could find it subversive, one doesn't know whether to laugh or cry."

He criticized US colonial rule and continuing US involvement in Philippine politics after independence, especially US support for Marcos. In this he pursued a similar line to the Filipino nationalist historian Renato Constantino.

== Writer and lecturer ==
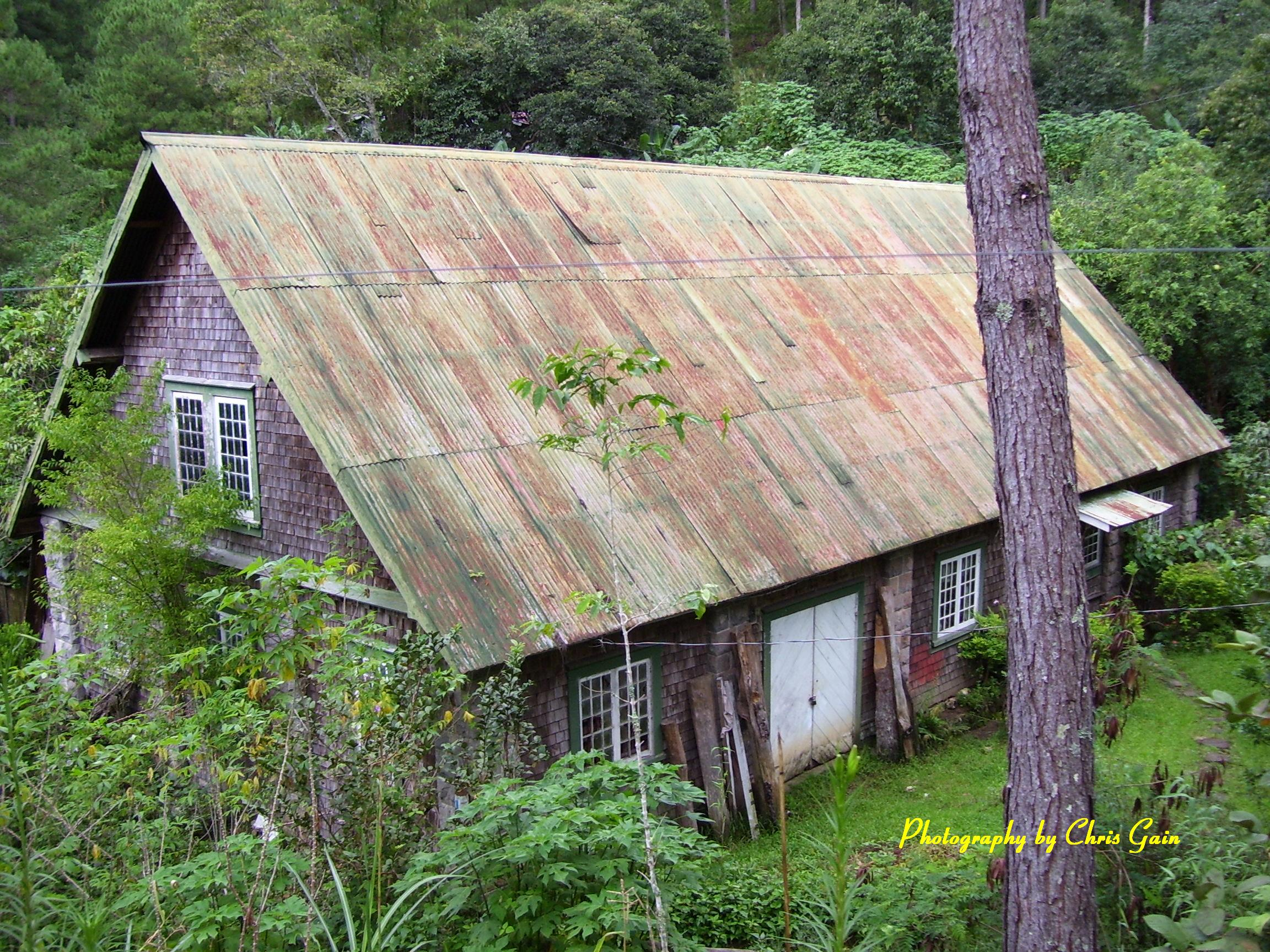
Scott's house in Sagada, viewed from the former Training School in 2007

Scott observed the Igorot people of the Cordillera region had preserved elements of pre-colonial culture to a greater degree, and over a wider area, than could be found elsewhere in the Philippines. He saw the resistance of Igorots to attempts by the Marcos government to develop projects in the region as a model for resistance elsewhere in the country. He did not support the view that the Igorots are intrinsically different from other Filipinos, or the view that the Cordillera should become an ethnic preserve.

Scott was scathing of views that divide Filipinos into ethnic groups, describing Henry Otley Beyer's wave migration theory as representing settlement by "wave after better wave" until the last wave which was "so advanced that it could appreciate the benefits of submitting to American rule". Views like these resonated with the progressive nationalist opposition to Marcos.

Scott held a bachelor's degree from Yale University, a master's degree from Columbia University, and a Doctor of Philosophy degree from the University of Santo Tomas in 1968. Scott's dissertation was published that year by the University of Santo Tomas Press as Prehispanic Source Materials for the Study of Philippine History. A revised and expanded second edition was published in 1984. He debunked the Kalantiaw legend in this book. Datu Kalantiaw was the main character in a historical fabrication written by Jose E. Marco in 1913. Through a series of failures by scholars to critically assess Marco's representation, the invented legend was adopted as actual history. As a result of Scott's work, Kalantiaw is no longer a part of the standard history texts in the Philippines.

Scott's first well known academic work is The Discovery of the Igorots. This is a history of the Cordillera mountain region over several centuries of Spanish contact, constructed from contemporary Spanish sources. Scott argues that the difficulties the Spaniards encountered extending their rule in the face of local resistance resulted in the inhabitants of the region being classified as a 'savage' race separate to the more tractable lowland Filipinos. Scott adopted a similar approach in Cracks in the Parchment Curtain in which he tries to glean a picture of pre-colonial Philippine society from early Spanish sources. This project was criticized by the Asianist Benedict Anderson who argued that it yielded a vision of Philippine society filtered through "late medieval" Spanish understanding. Scott was aware of this limitation, but argued Spanish records provided glimpses of Filipino society and native reaction to colonial dominion, often incidental to the intention of the Spanish chronicler, which were the cracks in the Spanish parchment curtain.

One of Scott's last full-scale books was Ilocano Responses to American Aggression. The foreword was written by Jose Maria Sison, the head of the Communist Party of the Philippines. The People Power Revolution, which coincided with the publication of the book, obscured the fact that the foreword had been written while Sison was in jail.

Harold Conklin's Biographical Note and Bibliography lists 243 extant written works by Scott from 1945 until those posthumously published in 1994.

== Death ==
Scott died unexpectedly on 4 October 1993, aged 72, at the St Luke's Hospital in Quezon City, following what was considered to have been a routine gall bladder operation. He was buried in the cemetery of Saint Mary the Virgin in Sagada on 10 October.

== Legacy ==
In 1994, the Ateneo de Manila University posthumously gave Scott the Tanglaw ng Lahi Award for a lifetime "spent in teaching not only in the classroom, but also the outside world by means of the broad reaches of his contacts and communication, and most of all through his hundreds of published scholarly articles and inspirationals which continue to disseminate and teach honest Philippine history to succeeding generations of Filipinos."

On December 8, 2021, the National Historical Commission of the Philippines unveiled a historical marker commemorating Scott at Saint Mary's School in Sagada.

== See also ==
- Datu
- Sagada
- Jeremias Aquino
- Renato Constantino
- Zeus Salazar

== Works ==
Scott's more well known works include

- Scott, William Henry (1974). Discovery of the Igorots (revised ed.). Quezon City: New Day Publishers. ISBN 971-10-0087-3.
- Scott, William Henry (1976). Hollow Ships on a Wine-Dark Sea and Other Essays. Quezon City: New Day Publishers.
- Scott, William Henry (1982). Cracks in the Parchment Curtain and Other Essays in Philippine History. Quezon City: New Day Publishers. ISBN 978-971-10-0000-4.
- Scott, William Henry (1984). Prehispanic Source Materials for the Study of Philippine History. New Day Publishers. ISBN 971-10-0226-4.
- Scott, William Henry (1986). Ilocano Responses to American Aggression, 1900-1901. Quezon City: New Day Publishers. ISBN 978-971-10-0336-4.
- Scott, William Henry (1987). Chips. Quezon City: New Day Publishers. ISBN 978-971-10-0331-9.
- Scott, William Henry (1988). A Sagada Reader. Quezon City: New Day Publishers. ISBN 978-971-10-0330-2.
- Scott, William Henry (1989). Who are You, Filipino Youth. Quezon City: New Day Publishers. ISBN 978-971-10-0345-6.
- Scott, William Henry (1989). Filipinos in China before 1500.
- Scott, William Henry (1991). Slavery in the Spanish Philippines. Manila: De La Salle University Press. ISBN 971-11-8102-9.
- Scott, William Henry (1992). Union Obrera Democratica: First Filipino Labor Union. Quezon City: New Day Publishers. ISBN 978-971-10-0488-0.
- Scott, William Henry (1992). Looking for the Prehispanic Filipino and Other Essays in the Philippine History. Quezon City: New Day Publishers. ISBN 971-10-0524-7.
- Scott, William Henry (1994). Barangay: Sixteenth Century Philippine Culture and Society. Quezon City: Ateneo de Manila University Press. ISBN 971-550-135-4.

Festschrift in honor of William Henry Scott

- Peralta, Jesus T, ed. (2001). Reflections on Philippine Culture and Society: Festschrift. Manila: Ateneo de Manila University Press. ISBN 978-971-550-368-6.

Select Collected Works

- Scott, William Henry (2006). Uc-Kung, Bezalie Bautista (ed.). Great Scott: the New Day William Henry Scott Reader. Quezon City: New Day Publishers. ISBN 971-10-1126-3.

Works as editor

- Scott, William Henry, ed. (1975). German Travelers on the Cordillera (1860-1890). Manila: The Filipiniana Book Guild.

== Biography and bibliography ==
- Harold C. Conklin (2001). "William Henry Scott: A Biographical Note and Bibliography". Reflections on Philippine culture and society: festschrift in honor of William Henry Scott. By Jesus T. Peralta; William Henry Scott. Ateneo de Manila University Press. ISBN 978-971-550-368-6.
