= Kalantiaw =

Philippine mythological figure

Datu Kalantiaw (Rajah Bendahara Kalantiaw) (sometimes spelled Kalantiao) is a widely publicized pseudohistorical figure based on an early 20th-century hoax by José Marco. Kalantiaw was credited with allegedly creating the first legal code in the Philippines, known as the Code of Kalantiaw in 1433. He gained national prominence in the 20th century in the Philippines, particularly in the island of Panay where allegedly held office.

His authenticity was debunked in 1965 by historian William Henry Scott in his PhD thesis, Critical Study of the Prehispanic Source Materials for the Study of Philippine History. Regardless, the hoax continued to be promulgated until the latter half of the 20th century. In 2005, the National Historical Commission of the Philippines officially recognized Kalantiaw and the Code of Kalantiaw to be a 20th-century fraudulent work by José Marco with no historical basis.

== History ==
Kalantiaw's name first appeared in print in July 1913 in an article entitled "Civilización prehispana" published in the Philippine news-magazine Renacimiento Filipino. The article mentioned 16 laws enacted by King Kalantiaw in 1433 and a fort that he built at Gagalangin, Negros, which was destroyed by an earthquake in the year A.D. 435 (not 1435). The article was written by Manuel Artigas who, only a year before, had contributed the footnotes to an essay by José Marco, Reseña historica de la Isla de Negros.

In 1914, José Marco donated five manuscripts to Dr. James A. Robertson for the Philippine Library and Museum. Robertson called Marco "a good friend to the institution" and his earliest contributions, "the greatest literary discovery ever made in the archipelago."

Among the documents was Las Antiguas leyendes de la Isla de Negros, a two volume leather bound work that was supposedly written by a Friar José María Pavón in 1838 and 1839. The Code of Kalantiaw, in chapter 9 of part 1, was one of six translated documents that were dated before the arrival of the Spaniards in the Philippines. The original Code was purportedly discovered in the possession of a Panay datu in 1614. At the time of Pavón's writing in 1839 it was supposedly owned by a Don Marcelio Orfila of Zaragoza. On July 20, 1915, Robertson submitted a paper about the Kalantiaw Code to the Panama-Pacific Historical Congress in California and then published an English translation of the Code in 1917.

The historian Josue Soncuya published a Spanish translation of the code in 1917, and wrote about it in his book Historia Prehispana de Filipinas (Prehispanic History of the Philippines). Soncuya concluded that the Code had been written for Aklan because of the presence of two Aklanon rather than Hiligaynon words in the text, and the words Aklan, Panay Island were added to later versions of Soncuya's translation (viz. "Echo en al año 1433–Calantiao–3° regulo").

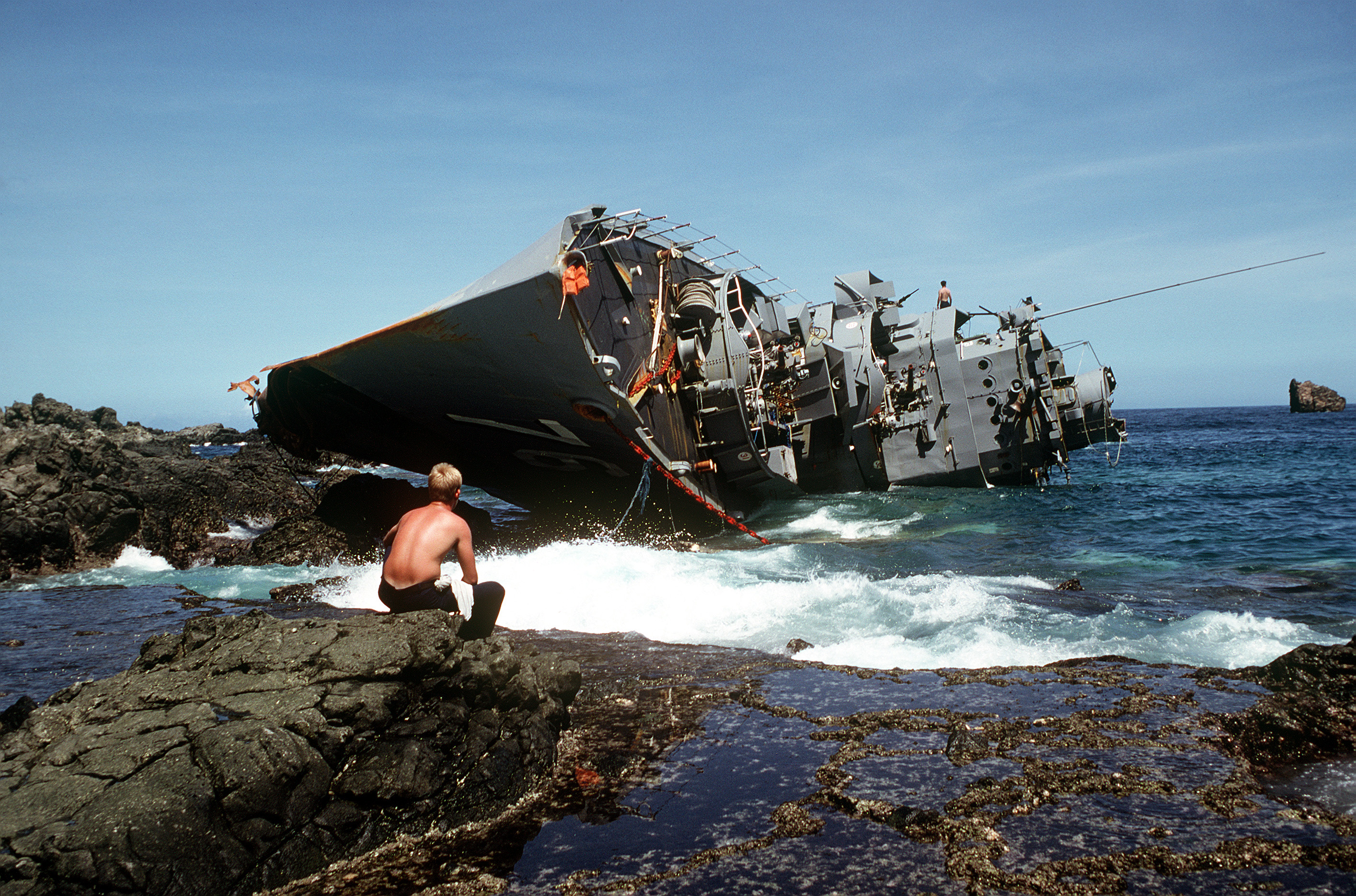
BRP Datu Kalantiaw (PS-76) capsized on Calayan Island, Philippines, 22 September 1981 (6371751)

In 1949, Gregorio Zaide included the Kalantiaw Code in his Philippine Political and Cultural History with the words "Aklan, Panay" attached to the title. In 1956, Digno Alba declared in his book Paging Datu Kalantiaw that the Datu had set up his government in Batan and made it the capital of the sakup of Aklan.

On June 1, 1956, acting upon the request of the Municipal Council of Batan, the Philippine Historical Committee installed a marker in a tract of land near the bay. This was unveiled on December 8, 1956.

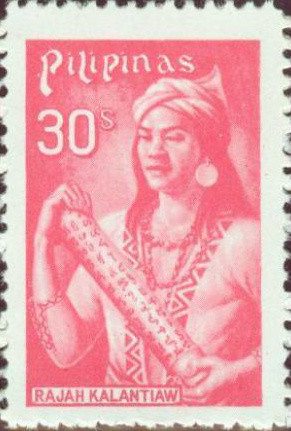
Kalantiaw 1978 stamp of the Philippines

On February 11, 1957, President Ramon Magsaysay approved Executive Order No. 234 declaring the site as a national shrine. A former school building in the town was transformed into the Kalantiaw Shrine by the Philippine Historical and Cultural Society and the Code of Kalantiaw was later inscribed there in brass.

Kalantiaw was honoured by the Philippine Navy in December 1967 when it acquired the World War II destroyer escort USS Booth from the United States and recommissioned it the RPS Datu Kalantiaw. That vessel was the flagship of the Philippine Navy from 1967 to 1981.

On March 1, 1971, President Ferdinand Marcos instituted the "Order of Kalantiao", an award "for services to the country in the areas of law and justice" (Executive Order No. 294). In January 24, 1973, President Ferdinand E. Marcos signed Presidential Decree No. 105 declaring national shrines such as sacred (hallowed) places and prohibiting desecration thereof.

On June 19, 1978 a 30-centavo postage stamp was released in honour of "Rajah Kalantiaw".

== Debunking the Code ==
In 1965, William Henry Scott was a doctoral candidate at the University of Santo Tomas when the bibliographer Mauro Garcia suggested that for his thesis he examine the history of the Philippines before the arrival of the Spaniards. Garcia had received several fake documents from José Marco in the past, which made him suspicious of Marco's first discoveries upon which so much early history was based. He only showed a few of these forgeries to Scott so as not to prejudice his research, saving the most blatant fakes until after Scott had formed his own conclusions about Marco's work.

Historian William Henry Scott asserted in his PhD thesis, Critical Study of the Prehispanic Source Materials for the Study of Philippine History that there is no evidence that any Filipino ruler by the name of Kalantiaw ever existed or that the Kalantiaw penal code is any older than 1914. Scott successfully defended the thesis in 1968 before a panel of eminent Filipino historians which included Teodoro Agoncillo, Horacio de la Costa, Marcelino Foronda, Nicolas Zafra, and Gregorio Zaide. The thesis was published by University of Santo Tomas Press Press in 1968.

== Aftermath ==
PHL Order of Kalantiao - Grand Cross BAR

William H. Scott's exposé did not have an immediate effect on Filipino society. On March 1, 1971, President Ferdinand Marcos instituted the "Order of Kalantiaw", an award "for services to the country in the areas of law and justice" (Executive Order No. 294). That same year a beauty pageant winner was crowned "Lakambini ni Kalantiaw" on the supposed anniversary of the Code (December 8), and the artist Carlos Valino Jr. depicted Kalantiaw issuing his commandments. On January 24, 1973, Marcos also issued Presidential Decree No. 105, which declared that the Kalantiaw Shrine, and all national shrines, were sacred. The decree prohibited all forms of desecration including "unnecessary noise and committing unbecoming acts." Like Kalantiaw's Code, the penalty was hefty; "imprisonment for not less than ten (10) years or a fine not less than ten thousand pesos (P10,000) or both."

Gregorio F. Zaide, the author of countless school textbooks and a member of the very dissertation panel that examined Scott's thesis in 1968 remained silent but he continued to endorse the myth and even add his own details to it in books such as Heroes of Philippine History (1970), Pageant of Philippine History (1979), History of the Republic of the Philippines (1983), Philippine History (1984), and in reissues of his older works. Soon after Dr. Zaide's death in 1986 his daughter, Sonia M. Zaide, revised the books that she had co-authored with her father and removed most, but not all, of the material based on the Marco hoaxes.

In 1994 the playwright Rene O. Villanueva dramatized the life of Jose E. Marco and the creation of the Kalantiaw hoax in the play Kalantiaw, Kagila-gilalas na Kasinungalingan (The Amazing Lie). Villanueva's intriguing story proposed that Marco's motivation for creating his frauds was his intense admiration for his personal hero, Jose Rizal. Marco's ambition was to better the accomplishments of Rizal by inventing a glorious past to fill the gaps in Filipino history.

The NHI admitted that Kalantiaw was a hoax in 1998 when Chief Justice Andres Narvasa, who was about to receive the Kalantiaw Award, asked Malacañang to look into the matter. President Joseph Estrada gave him the award anyway. In 2005, the NHI, under the leadership of Ambeth Ocampo, made their opinion official when they submitted a resolution to President Arroyo to revoke the national shrine status of the Kalantiaw Shrine in Aklan. That resolution, National Historical Institute (NHI) Resolution No. 12 of 2004, declared "[...] that Code of Kalantiao/Kalantiaw has no Valid Historical Basis". The NHI called for: (1) the official affirmation that the Kalantiaw Code is a twentieth-century fraudulent work by Jose Marco, (2) the President of the Philippines cease to honor retiring Supreme justices and other international dignitaries with the 'Order of Kalantiaw', and (3) the revoking of Executive Order 234, which declared the municipality of Batan, Province of Aklan as a national shrine. This NHI resolution was approved by the Office of the President in 2005 and taken into effect immediately, despite strong protests from the people of the province of Aklan.

Some Filipinos, both scholars and non-scholars, continue to believe that the Code of Kalantiaw and the datu/chieftain who supposedly promulgated these laws actually existed. In a 2001 International conference presentation on 'The Philippine Judicial System', Dr. Raul Pangalangan, Dean, College of Law from the University of the Philippines said, "[...] all ancient written laws of the Filipinos were lost with the exception of the Code of Maragtas and the Code of Kalantiaw, both from Panay Island." During the Philippine House of Representative 2nd Regular Session in August 2008, Congressman Aurora Cerilles referred to the signing of the Code of Kalantiaw in Panay saying, "That is why there is the so-called 'The Code of Kalantiaw,' where a person called Marikudo signed a treaty with Sumakwel".

== Impact in Filipino literature, arts and culture ==
Before and despite recognition of his inauthenticity, Kalantiao has left a lasting impact on Filipinos, who have embraced his character as part of their cultural heritage.

Inside the National Museum of the Philippines (formerly the Legislative Building), Kalantiao is portrayed alongside 13 other sculptures of renowned historical lawmakers & legislators of the world on the entablature of the Senate Session Hall, which survived the rampant devastation of the Battle of Manila of February 1945, and has been mostly restored to its pre-War state.

In 2003, President Gloria Macapagal Arroyo signed executive order 236, consolidating the current Philippine honours system and, in it, the "Order of Kalantiao" ceased being an honour. However, the Implementing Rules and Regulations of the Executive Order did list the Order of Kalantiaw as one of the Honors of the Philippines.

The Central Philippine University in Iloilo has its own "Order of Kalantiao", a fraternity that was at the centre of a serious hazing incident in September 2001. Even the National Historical Institute (NHI) honoured Kalantiaw in 1989 by including him in volume 4 of their five volumes of Filipinos in History. The Gintong Pamana (Golden Heritage) Awards Foundation, a project of Philippine Time USA Magazine, rewards community leadership among Filipino-Americans with the "Kalantiaw Award". Buildings, streets and banquet halls throughout the Philippines still bear the name of the mythical ruler of Panay and tourists can still visit the Kalantiaw Shrine in Batan, Aklan or even pass by a local high school, Kalantiaw Institute.

In the movies, there is Alagad ni Kalantiao starred by Lito Lapid. In television, a fantasy series was aired in 1986 in GMA Network entitled Mga Alagad ni Kalantiao about three people who each has a rod when formed in triangle transforms them into superheroes.

== See also ==
- Datu
