= Francisco Feliciano =

Filipino conductor and composer (1941–2014)

- Born: February 19, 1941; Morong, Rizal, Philippine Commonwealth
- Died: September 19, 2014 (aged 73); Manila, Philippines
- Occupations: Composer, conductor
- Awards: Order of National Artists

Francisco Francisco Feliciano (19 February 1941 – 19 September 2014) was a Filipino composer and conductor. He was a National Artist of the Philippines for Music.

== Life ==
Feliciano was born on 19 February 1941, in Morong, Rizal.

Francisco Feliciano graduated from the University of the Philippines with a Teacher's diploma in Music (1967) and a Masters in Music degree in Composition (1972). In 1977, he went to the Hochschule der Kuenste in Berlin, Germany to obtain a diploma in Music Composition. In 1979 he attended Yale University School of Music and graduated with a Master of Musical Arts and a Doctorate in Musical Arts, Composition. While at Yale University he conducted the Yale Contemporary Ensemble, considered one of the leading performing groups in America for contemporary and avant-garde music. His teachers in conducting were Arthur Weisberg and Martin Behrmann, while he studied composition under Jacob Druckman, Isang Yun, H.W. Zimmerman and Krzysztof Penderecki.

He died on September 19, 2014, in Manila at the age of 73.

== List of works ==
Major works and arrangements include:

- Buksan mo ang aming mga labi (published 1982)
- Mass of Saint Andrew (published 1981)
- Pamugun (choral, with soprano solo. published 2002)
- Pokpok alimpako (chorus. published 2002)
- Three Visayan folksongs: for high voice (published 1998)

== Awards and honors ==
- 2014 - National Artist for Music
