= Virginia Moreno =

Filipina writer (1923–2021)

- Born: April 24, 1923; Tondo, Manila, Philippine Islands
- Died: August 14, 2021 (aged 98)
- Resting place: Manila Memorial Park – Sucat, Paranaque, Philippines
- Occupations: Writer, poet
- Writing career
- Notable works: Batik Maker and Other Poems; The Onyx Wolf (1969)

Virginia R. Moreno (April 24, 1923 – August 14, 2021) was a Filipina writer, poet, and playwright.

== Early life and education ==
Moreno was born in the Tondo neighbourhood of Manila on April 24, 1923. She studied at the University of the Philippines, where she was editor of the campus newspaper, and at the Kansas Institute of International Education.

== Career ==
Her first collection of poems Batik Maker and Other Poems was published in 1972; it received the Palanca Memorial Award for Literature. Her play Straw Patriot (1956) was translated into Filipino by Wilfredo Pascua Sanchez in 1967 as Bayaning huwad. In 1969, she won the National Historical Playwriting Contest for her play The Onyx Wolf, also known as La Loba Negra and Itim Asu. Also in 1969, she studied at the British Film Institute in London under a British Council grant. In 1973, she was co-director of the documentary The Imaginative Community: 7 Poets in Iowa. Moreno also took part in the International Writing Program at the University of Iowa. In 1976, she became director of the University of the Philippines Film Center.

In 1984, Moreno received a S.E.A. Write Award. In 1991, she was named Chevalier in the Ordre des Palmes Académiques by France. She has also served as chair of the UNESCO Culture Committee of the Philippines.

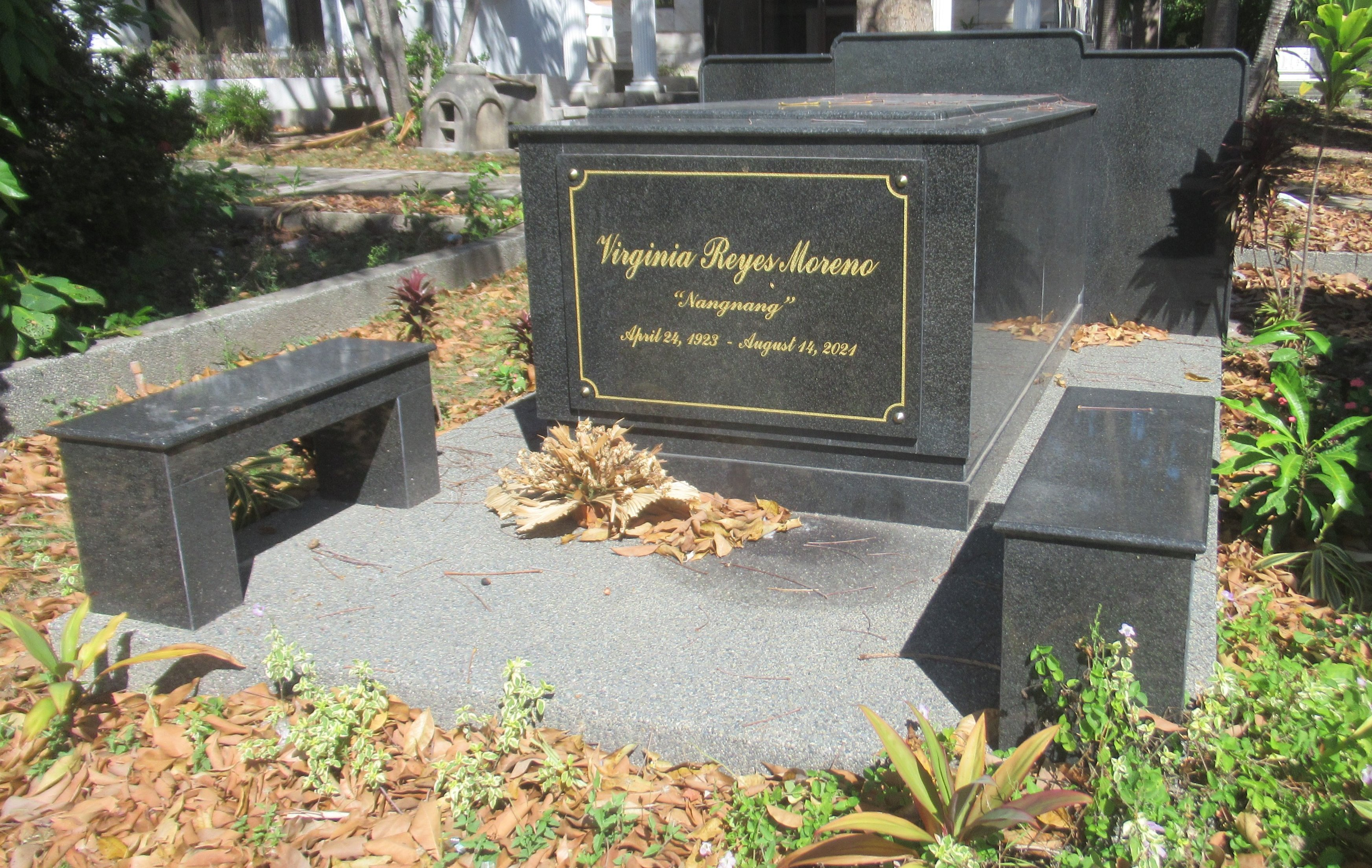
Moreno's grave at Manila Memorial Park – Sucat.

== Personal life and death ==
Moreno died on August 14, 2021, at the age of 98.
