= Manolito Four Eyes =

- Theatrical release poster
- Spanish: Manolito Gafotas
- Directed by: Miguel Albaladejo
- Screenplay by: Elvira Lindo; Miguel Albaladejo
- Based on: the character by Elvira Lindo
- Produced by: Julio Fernández
- Starring: David Sánchez del Rey; Adriana Ozores; Roberto Álvarez; Antonio Gamero; Fedra Lorente; Marta Fernández-Muro; Gloria Muñoz; Alejandro Martínez; David Martínez
- Cinematography: Alfonso Sanz Alduán
- Edited by: Pablo Blanco
- Music by: Lucio Godoy
- Production companies: Castelao Productions; Dos Ocho Cine
- Distributed by: Filmax
- Release dates: 6 June 1999 (Málaga); 25 June 1999 (Spain)
- Country: Spain
- Language: Spanish

Manolito Four Eyes (Spanish: Manolito Gafotas) is a 1999 Spanish comedy film directed by Miguel Albaladejo based on the character created by Elvira Lindo.

== Plot ==
The plot follows the mishaps of Manolito "Gafotas", a boy from the working-class neighborhood of Carabanchel, living with his mother, his grandfather, and his younger brother ('the Imbecile'), while his father is often away due to his job as a truck driver.

== Cast ==
- David Sánchez del Rey as Manolito García Moreno "Gafotas"
- Adriana Ozores as Catalina
- Roberto Álvarez as Manolo
- Antonio Gamero as abuelo Nicolás
- Fedra Lorente as Alicia
- Marta Fernández-Muro as la Luisa
- Gloria Muñoz as la "sita" Asunción
- Alejandro and David Martínez as Nicolás "el Imbécil"
- Laura Calabuig as Susanita "Bragas Sucias"
- Sergio del Pino as "el Orejones"
- Álvaro Miranda as Yihad
- Ángeles Albaladejo as Benítez
- Elvira Lindo as Cardona
- Paco Valladares as cura

== Production ==
The film is a Castelao Productions and Dos Ocho Cine production for Sogedasa. Apart from writing duties, Lindo also played a small role as the agent Cardona.

== Release ==
The film premiered in a non-competitive slot of the Málaga Film Festival in June 1999. Distributed by Filmax, the film was released theatrically in Spain on 25 June 1999. It grossed €2,552,809 (691,758 admissions).

== Reception ==
Jonathan Holland of Variety assessed that Albaladejo's sophomore feature "harnesses winsome perfs to spot-on child's-eye observation, making for an enjoyably refreshing hour and a half".

Ángel Fernández-Santos in El País described the film as an "intelligent and very lively, fun, clean, free" comedy.

== Accolades ==
Year	Award	Category	Nominee(s)	Result	Ref.
2000	14th Goya Awards	Best Adapted Screenplay	Elvira Lindo, Miguel Albaladejo	Nominated	

== See also ==
- List of Spanish films of 1999
