= The Dinner Guest =

- Theatrical release poster
- Spanish: El comensal
- Directed by: Ángeles González-Sinde
- Screenplay by: Ángeles González-Sinde; Gabriela Ybarra (collab.)
- Based on: El comensal by Gabriela Ybarra
- Produced by: Gerardo Herrero
- Starring: Susana Abaitua; Ginés García Millán; Adriana Ozores
- Cinematography: Juan Carlos Gómez
- Edited by: Irene Blecua
- Music by: Antonio Garamendi
- Production companies: Tornasol; Okolin Producciones Cinematográficas; EnBabia Films
- Distributed by: A Contracorriente Films
- Release dates: 24 April 2022 (BCN Film Fest); 27 May 2022 (Spain)
- Country: Spain
- Language: Spanish

The Dinner Guest (Spanish: El comensal) is a 2022 Spanish drama film directed by Ángeles González-Sinde based on the novel by Gabriela Ybarra starring Susana Abaitua and Ginés García Millán alongside Adriana Ozores.

== Plot ==
Set in two different timelines, in 1977 in Bilbao and 2011 in Navarre, the plot follows the processes of pain and grief of Fernando (caused by his father's kidnapping by ETA) and Iciar (Fernando's daughter; caused by her mother Adela's terminal cancer).

== Cast ==
- Susana Abaitua as Iciar
- Ginés García Millán as Fernando
- Adriana Ozores as Adela
- Fernando Oyagüez as Fernando Arriaga
- Iñaki Miramón as abuelo
- Ane Gabarain

== Production ==
The screenplay is based on the novel El comensal by Gabriela Ybarra, which incorporates autobiographical experiences of Gabriela Ybarra around her grandfather Javier Ybarra's killing in 1977. The film was produced by Tornasol, Okolin Producciones Cinematográficas, and EnBabia Films with the participation of RTVE and Movistar Plus+.

== Release ==
Selected for the official selection of the BCN Film Fest, the film world premiered on 24 April 2024. Distributed by A Contracorriente Films, the film was released theatrically in Spain on 27 May 2022.

== Reception ==
Paula Arantzazu Ruiz of Cinemanía rated the film 2½ out of 5 stars, writing that the initial rhythm cannot be sustained due to the comings and goings between timelines.

Pere Vall of Fotogramas rated the film 4 out of 5 stars, highlighting Abaitua (a portentous dramatic actress) and the film's use of silences, glances and light as the film's best.

== See also ==
- List of Spanish films of 2022
