= Bear Cub =

2004 film by Miguel Albaladejo

- Theatrical release poster
- Spanish: Cachorro
- Directed by: Miguel Albaladejo
- Written by: Salvador García Ruiz; Miguel Albaladejo
- Produced by: Juan Alexander
- Starring: José Luis García Pérez; David Castillo; Arno Chevrier; Elvira Lindo; Mario Arias; Diana Cerezo
- Cinematography: Alfonso Sanz Alduán
- Edited by: Pablo Blanco
- Music by: Lucio Godoy
- Production company: Star Line Productions
- Distributed by: Manga Films
- Release dates: 8 February 2004 (Berlin); 27 February 2004 (Spain)
- Running time: 98 minutes
- Country: Spain
- Language: Spanish
- Box office: $389,486

Bear Cub (Spanish: Cachorro) is a 2004 Spanish comedy-drama film co-written and directed by Miguel Albaladejo. The plot follows a bearish gay man who ends up looking after his nephew while his sister goes away to India and in turn makes him develop a fatherly bond with the boy, that forces him to change his own lifestyle.

== Plot ==
As a favor to his hippie sister who has gone off to India, Pedro, a gay dentist, has agreed to look after his nine-year-old nephew, Bernardo. Bernardo's father is dead and the boy and his uncle have not had much to do with each other until now. Originally, the boy was to stay with Pedro for a few days, but six weeks have passed with no word from the boy's mother.

His nephew's presence forces Pedro to take a break from his otherwise extremely active sex life. In fact, Pedro was beginning to tire of the superficial nature of his frequent relationships. Even his boyfriend, Manuel, who suddenly pays Pedro a visit and who shares his penchant for leather and latex, is not really the man with whom he wants to spend the rest of his life, although they express love for each other. Then, all at once, an entirely different set of problems arise. For one, there is Doña Teresa, Bernardo's paternal grandmother, who one day darkens Pedro's door and puts the emotional screws on him. Worse still, however, is the news that Bernardo's mother has been arrested in India for drug smuggling. She may be facing a prison sentence of 30 years, so the embassy informs Pedro. Pedro is just as shocked at this news as Bernardo; nevertheless, he realizes that he is now responsible for the boy. Without further ado, he decides to rise to the challenge this represents. There suddenly seem to be so many things to organize – such as repairs to the house and finding a school for the boy – that Pedro hardly misses the life he used to lead. Gradually, however, he succeeds in rekindling his sex life – albeit in a less excessive form.

Doña Teresa makes another appearance, this time demanding custody of Bernardo. However, Pedro is willing to fight for the boy's welfare. After illegally obtaining his medical history (revealing that Pedro is HIV positive) and hiring a private investigator who obtains pictures of Pedro on a night out in a gay club, and threatening him with both, he ends up allowing her to enroll Bernardo in a boarding school. When his grandmother goes to visit Bernardo later on, revealing Pedro's HIV status (despite their previous agreement), Bernardo reveals that he already knew from his mother, and that his mother was HIV positive as well. She then reveals that Pedro is in the hospital with pneumonia. Bernardo tells her that he hates her and that it is her fault that Pedro is currently in the hospital, because she was not there to care for him.

Three years pass, during which several letters go back and forth between Bernardo, Pedro, his mother and his grandmother. Bernardo and two of his friends, a boy and girl, attend a funeral, where a casket is being lowered, although it is not immediately revealed whose funeral this is. Shortly after, a cab pulls up with Pedro inside, out of the hospital and healthy, and he expresses lament at the passing of Bernardo's grandmother. After a brief conversation, Bernardo returns to his two friends, kisses both, and parts from them; it is unclear whether or not he is romantically involved with one of them. Bernardo then returns to his uncle and they ride away together in the cab.

== Meaning of the Spanish name ==
The Spanish word cachorro describes any young, furry animal such as a cub or puppy.

== Cast ==
- José Luis García Pérez as Pedro
- David Castillo as Bernardo at 9 years old
- Daniel Llobregat as Bernardo at 14 years old
- Diana Cerezo as Lola
- Arno Chevrier as Manuel
- Empar Ferrer as Doña Teresa
- Elvira Lindo as Violeta
- Mario Arias as Javi

== Distribution ==
The film had its world premiere at the 54th Berlin International Film Festival on 8 February 2004, and was shortly followed by a nationwide release in Spain on 27 February 2004. It then made its debut in the United States at the 2004 Miami International GL Film Festival on 28 April 2004, and received theatrical releases in New York City on 5 November 2004 and in Los Angeles on 19 November 2004, earning $99,261 at the US box office. It was first released on DVD on 10 May 2005, and was released again as an unrated director's cut on 1 March 2007.

For its premiere in the United States, two sex scenes are cut (the initial scene and the one in the sauna).

== Film festivals ==
- 2004 Berlin International Film Festival
- 2004 Tribeca Film Festival
- 40th Chicago International Film Festival
- 2004 Philadelphia International Gay & Lesbian Film Festival
- 2004 Miami International GL Film Festival
- 2005 Tokyo International Lesbian & Gay Film Festival
