= Gabriela Ybarra =

Spanish writer

Gabriela Ybarra (b. 1983) is a Spanish writer. Her novel, The Dinner Guest (Spanish: El comensal), was nominated for the International Booker Prize in 2018.

== Life ==
Ybarra was born into a politically active family in Vizcaya, in Spain. Her grandfather, Javier de Ybarra y Bergé, was a former mayor of Bilbao, and fought on the side of the Nationalists during the Spanish Civil War. In 1977 he was kidnapped and murdered by members of the Basque separatist group, Eta.

Ybarra lives in Madrid, works as a social media analyst, and has one son.

== Writing ==
Ybarra's book, The Dinner Guest, is a work of autofiction, based on her own family's history. She has drawn on her grandfather's kidnap and murder by Basque separatists in 1977, as well as her family's experience of receiving bomb threats, and her mother, Ernestina Pasch's diagnosis with cancer, for the book. The book was published in Spanish in 2015, and was translated to English by Natasha Wimmer for publication in 2017.

Screenwriter Angels González-Sinde and producer Isabel Delclaux have indicated that they intend to adapt The Dinner Guest to film.

== Bibliography ==
- The Dinner Guest (El comensal), translated from the Spanish by Natasha Wimmer (Harville Secker)

== Awards ==
- 2016 - The Dinner Guest won the Euskadi de Literatura in Spain.
- 2018 - The Dinner Guest was nominated for the International Booker Prize.
