= José Luis García Pérez =

Spanish actor

José Luis García Pérez (born 1972 in Sevilla, Spain) is a Spanish actor in film, theatre, and television. He studied at the Centro Andaluz de Teatro (CAT). Perez portrayed the role of Pedro in the 2005 film Cachorro, where he was nominated for a Goya Award for Best Newcomer. He has worked with Gerardo Herrero, Benito Zambrano, and José Luis Garci in film; and Blanca Portillo and Carlos Saura in theater. Perez was the founder and director of Quijotada, a show that has toured Spain and other countries. He runs his own company, "Digo Digo Teatro". Perez hosted the 39th Latin American Film Festival of Huelva. Pérez directed Vampiros, which revolves around the story of Dracula.

== Filmography ==
=== Actor ===
Year	Film	Director
2015	Requisitos para ser una persona normal	Leticia Dolera
2015	El Pais Del Miedo	Francisco Espada
2012	Holmes & Watson. Madrid Days	José Luis Garci
2013	El Rey	(TV movie)
2012	A puerta fría	Xavi Puebla
2012	Habitantes (Cortometraje)	Leticia Dolera
2012	Copenhague (Cortometraje)	Luis María Ferrández
2011	Los niños salvajes	Patricia Ferreira
2011	Tres (Cortometraje)	Carlos Violadé
2010	Impávido	Carlos Therón
2010	Alfonso, el principe maldito	(TV movie)
2010	Buried	Rodrigo Cortés
2010	Desechos	David Marqués
2009	Ways to Live Forever	Gustavo Ron
2008	Retorno a Hansala	Chus Gutiérrez
2008	Un novio para Yasmina	Irene Cardona
2007	Que parezca un accidente	Gerardo Herrero
2007	8 citas	Peris Romano y Rodrigo Sorogoyen
2006	Lola, la película	Miguel Hermoso
2006	La sombra de nadie	Pablo Malo
2006	Siete mesas de billar francés	Gracia Querejeta
2005	Va a ser que nadie es perfecto	Joaquín Oristrell
2005	Arena en los bolsillos	César Martínez
2005	Los aires difíciles	Gerardo Herrero
2004	Volando voy	Miguel Albaladejo
2004	Reinas	Manuel Gómez Pereira
2004	El mundo alrededor	Álex Calvo-Sotelo
2003	Héctor	Gracia Querejeta
2003	Cachorro	Miguel Albaladejo
2003	El Lobo	Miguel Courtois
2003	Recambios	Manuel Fernández
2003	Mirados (Cortometraje)	Julio Fraga
2003	Llévame a otro sitio (Cortometraje)	David Martín
2002	Una pasión singular	Antonio Gonzalo
2002	El traje	Alberto Rodríguez
2001	Semana santa	Pepe Dancuart
2001	Asalto Informático	Miguel Ángel Carrasco
2001	Cuando todo esté en orden	César Martínez
1998	I'm fine in Wellington (Cortometraje)	Jesús Carlos Salmerón
1997	Mucho por vivir (Cortometraje)	Jesús Carlos Salmerón
1997	Mi nuevo pie de rey (Cortometraje)	Santi Amodeo

=== Director ===
Year	Production
2009	Parenthesis (Cortometraje)

== Theatre ==
=== Actor ===
Año	Obra	Compañía	Director
2015	Don Juan Tenorio	Avance Productions & Teatro Compania Nacional Clasico	Blanca Portillo
2013	Diario de un Loco	Teatro Español	Luis Luque
2013	El gran teatro del mundo	Teatro Español	Carlos Saura
2012	Viejos tiempos	Teatro Español	Ricardo Moya
2011	La avería	Avance Producciones & Entrecajas	Blanca Portillo
2009	Arte	Trasgo Producciones	Eduardo Recabarren
2008-2009	En la boca del lobo	Digo Digo Teatro	
2006-2007	Closer		Mariano Barroso
2003-2004	5 y Acción	Digo Digo Teatro	
2002	Silencio	C.A.T.	
2000-2002	En la boca del lobo	Digo Digo Teatro	
1999-2000	Cuatro y una silla que son cinco	Digo Digo Teatro	Juan Carlos Sánchez
1997	Macbeth		David Perry
1997	Faith		Julio Fraga
1997	Encuentro de poetas		Ramón Bocanegra
1997	Vivir como cerdos		Jesús Carlos Salmerón
1997	Vamos s dormir		Juan Motilla
1996-1997	Monólogos de máscaras contemporáneas		Juan Carlos Sánchez
1996	Héctor 1,2,3,...,5,6,7		Santiago Amodeo
1993	El abanico de Lady Windermere		Juan Carlos Pérez de la Fuente
1991	Pero no morirás		B. Soriano

=== Director ===
- Celosías (2012) (Microteatro)
- Vampiros, la belleza siniestra (2006)
- Quijotadas (2005)
- Nombre de mujer (1996-1997)
- Vayas donde vayas (1996)
