= Rancour =

2002 Spanish film

- Theatrical release poster
- Spanish: Rencor
- Directed by: Miguel Albaladejo
- Screenplay by: Miguel Albaladejo
- Produced by: José Nolla; Antonio Saura; Ximo Pérez; Enrique González Macho
- Starring: Lolita; Jorge Perugorría; Elena Anaya
- Cinematography: Alfonso Sanz Alduán
- Edited by: Pablo Blanco
- Music by: Lucio Godoy
- Production companies: Icónica; Zebra Producciones; Alta Producción; Trivisión
- Distributed by: Alta Films
- Release date: 31 May 2002
- Country: Spain
- Language: Spanish

Rancour (Spanish: Rencor) is a 2002 drama film directed by Miguel Albaladejo which stars Lolita Flores, Jorge Perugorría, and Elena Anaya.

== Plot ==
Upon meeting up again in a Mediterranean beach in Cullera after 10 years, middling chiringuito singer Chelo Zamora plots to take revenge on her former love interest, Cuban scoundrel Toni.

== Cast ==
- Lolita as Chelo Zamora
- Jorge Perugorría as Toni
- Elena Anaya as Esther
- Mar Regueras as Natalia
- Roberto Hernández as Marcos
- Jorge Alcázar as Paco
- Geli Albaladejo as Maribel
- Roman Lucknar as Roman
- Noé Alcázar as Miguel Ángel

== Production ==
The film is an Icónica, Zebra Producciones, Alta Producción, and Trivision production, with the participation of Vía Digital and TVV.

== Release ==
Distributed by Alta Films, Rancour was released theatrically in Spain on 31 May 2002.

== Reception ==
Jonathan Holland of Variety assessed that "despite strong perfs and an engaging storyline, the subject matter is sometimes less than plausible".

Fernando Méndez-Leite of Fotogramas considered that, while "not a perfect film", Rancour "continually touches the viewer's sensibility through the truthfulness of its characters and the detail of the mise-en-scène", "structured around a magnificent character" (Lolita Flores').

== Accolades ==
Year	Award	Category	Nominee(s)	Result	Ref.
2003	17th Goya Awards	Best Supporting Actress	Mar Regueras	Nominated	
2003	17th Goya Awards	Best New Actress	Lolita	Won	

== See also ==
- List of Spanish films of 2002
