= Blue Lights of Benidorm =

- Theatrical release poster
- Spanish: Después de Kim
- Directed by: Ángeles González Sinde
- Screenplay by: Ángeles González Sinde
- Based on: Después de Kim (novel) by Ángeles González Sinde
- Produced by: Gerardo Herrero; Pedro Pastor
- Starring: Adriana Ozores; Darío Grandinetti
- Cinematography: Lara Vilanova Sentís
- Edited by: Irene Blecua
- Music by: Paula Olaz
- Production companies: Después de Kim AIE; Voramar Films; Tornasol Media
- Distributed by: Karma Films
- Release dates: 8 March 2026 (Málaga); 24 April 2026 (Spain)
- Country: Spain
- Language: Spanish

Blue Lights of Benidorm (Spanish: Después de Kim, lit. 'After Kim') is a 2026 Spanish drama film written and directed by Ángeles González Sinde based on her own novel. It stars Adriana Ozores and Darío Grandinetti.

== Plot ==
The plot is set in Benidorm. Juan and Gloria (a divorced couple) travel from Argentina to Spain to identify the body of their estranged missing daughter Kim, but once there, they find out that Kim left them a grandson who is also missing.

== Cast ==
- Adriana Ozores
- Darío Grandinetti
- Gloria March
- Cristina García
- Roger Aranda
- Karina Kolokolchykova
- Kevin Brand
- Christina Rosenvinge

== Production ==
The film is a Después de Kim AIE, Voramar Films, and Tornasol Media production, with the participation of RTVE, Movistar Plus+, and À Punt, and backing from ICAA, Generalitat Valenciana, and ICO. Filming locations included Benidorm (the bulk of outdoor shots) and Valencia (indoor shots).

== Release ==
Cast and crew members attending the 2026 Málaga Film Festival

The film world premiered at the 29th Málaga Film Festival on 8 March 2026. Latido Films handled international sales. Distributed by Karma Films, the film is scheduled to be released theatrically in Spain on 24 April 2026.

== Reception ==
Víctor A. Gómez of La Opinión de Málaga decried the film as an example of "soulless cinema, presented with such overwhelming correctness that it flattens the few wrinkles of interest" it might have possessed, in a similar way to other films produced by Tornasol.

Javier Ocaña of El País lamented that the film, otherwise "stuck 25 years in the past", "lacks depth in its treatment and punch in its mise-en-scène.

In a 1-star rating, Manuel J. Lombardo of Diario de Sevilla described the "wrong" film as an "erratic and disjointed" work.

== Accolades ==
Year	Award	Category	Nominee(s)	Result	Ref.
2026	9th Lola Gaos Awards	Best Actress	Adriana Ozores	Pending	
2026	9th Lola Gaos Awards	Best Supporting Actress	Gloria March	Pending	
2026	9th Lola Gaos Awards	Best Original Song	"Sin decir adiós" by Christina Rosenvinge	Pending	

== See also ==
- List of Spanish films of 2026
