= Like a Fading Shadow =

2014 novel by Antonio Muñoz Molina

Like a Fading Shadow (Spanish: Como la sombra que se va) is a novel by Spanish writer Antonio Muñoz Molina, published in 2014. The English translation by Camilo A. Ramirez was shortlisted for the 2018 International Booker Prize.

== Plot ==
The novel has three plotlines: first, it recounts the last days of MLK's assassin, James Earl Ray, in Lisbon; secondly, it recounts Muñoz Molina's life in Lisbon in 1987, and finally, Muñoz Molina reflects on his life in 2014.

== Reception ==
Bécquer Seguín of Slate praised the chapters dedicated to Ray, but criticized the chapters dedicated to the author's life in Lisbon, commenting "Only the most dedicated Muñoz Molina scholar might find something of value in chapter-length collages of writerly anxieties, boilerplate theories of the novel, and overdramatized memories of an overripe affair."

The English translation by Camilo A. Ramirez was shortlisted for the International Booker Prize in 2018 and longlisted for the Dublin Literary Award in 2019.
