= Sleeping Luck =

- Spanish: La suerte dormida
- Directed by: Ángeles González-Sinde
- Written by: Ángeles González-Sinde; Belén Gopegui
- Produced by: Gerardo Herrero; Javier López Blanco; Mariela Besuievsky
- Starring: Adriana Ozores; Félix Gómez; Pepe Soriano
- Cinematography: Antonio Calvache
- Edited by: Fernando Pardo
- Music by: Miguel Malla
- Production company: Tornasol Films
- Release date: 21 November 2003
- Running time: 105 minutes
- Country: Spain
- Language: Spanish

Sleeping Luck (Spanish: La suerte dormida) is a 2003 film directed by Ángeles González-Sinde which stars Adriana Ozores alongside Félix Gómez and Pepe Soriano.

== Synopsis ==
Amparo, a lawyer who has recently lost her family, accepts an indemnity case against a construction company for the death of one of its workers.

== Cast ==
- Adriana Ozores as Amparo
- Félix Gómez as Agustín
- Pepe Soriano as José
- Carlos Kaniowsky as Floro
- Fanny de Castro as Rosa
- Chani Martín as Genaro
- Antonio Muñoz de Mesa as Peláez
- Josu Ormaetxe as jefe de obra
- Pilar Castro as Sonia
- Joaquín Climent as Hormaeche
- Francesc Orella as Miguel

== Accolades ==
| Year | Award | Category | Nominee(s) | Result | Ref. |
|---|---|---|---|---|---|
| 2004 | 18th Goya Awards | Best New Director | Ángeles González-Sinde | Won | |
| 2004 | 18th Goya Awards | Best Actress | Adriana Ozores | Nominated | |
| 2004 | 13th Actors and Actresses Union Awards | Best Film Actress in a Leading Role | Adriana Ozores | Nominated | |

== See also ==
- List of Spanish films of 2003
