= Elvira Lindo =

Spanish journalist and writer (born 1962)

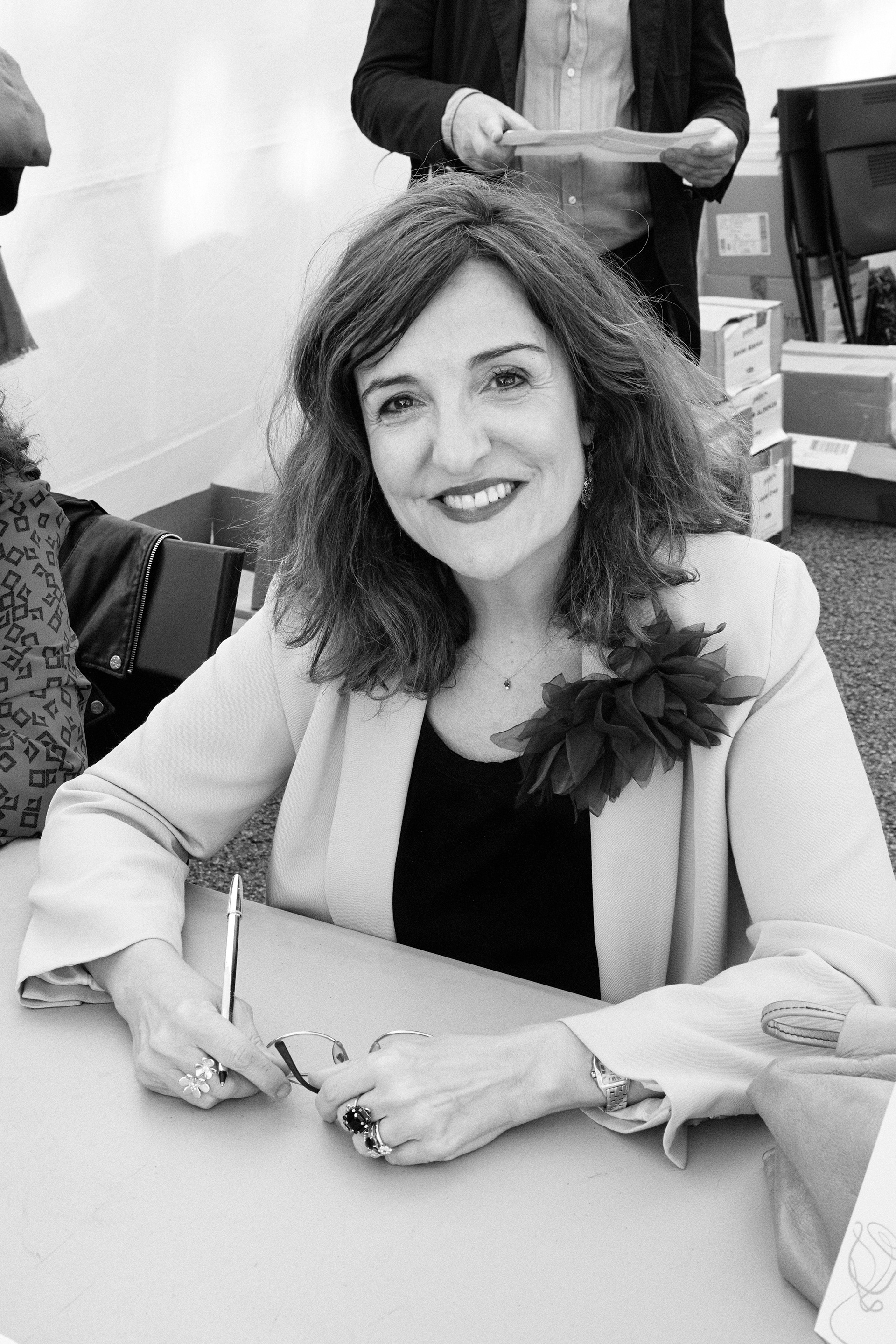
- Elvira Lindo in Barcelona on Saint George's Day 2023
- Born: Elvira Lindo Garrido; 23 January 1962 (age 64); Cádiz, Andalusia, Spain
- Education: Complutense University of Madrid (without graduating)
- Occupations: Writer; journalist; essayist; novelist; screenplay writer; actress; film director
- Spouse: Antonio Muñoz Molina (m. 1994)
- Children: 1
- Writing career
- Language: Spanish
- Genres: Journalism; novel; short story
- Notable work: Manolito Gafotas
- Notable awards: Premio Nacional de Literatura Infantil y Juvenil (1998); Premio Biblioteca Breve (2005)
- Literary movement: Spanish literature; children's literature
- Website: www.elviralindo.com/blog/

Elvira Lindo Garrido (born 23 January 1962) is a Spanish journalist and writer.

== Biography ==
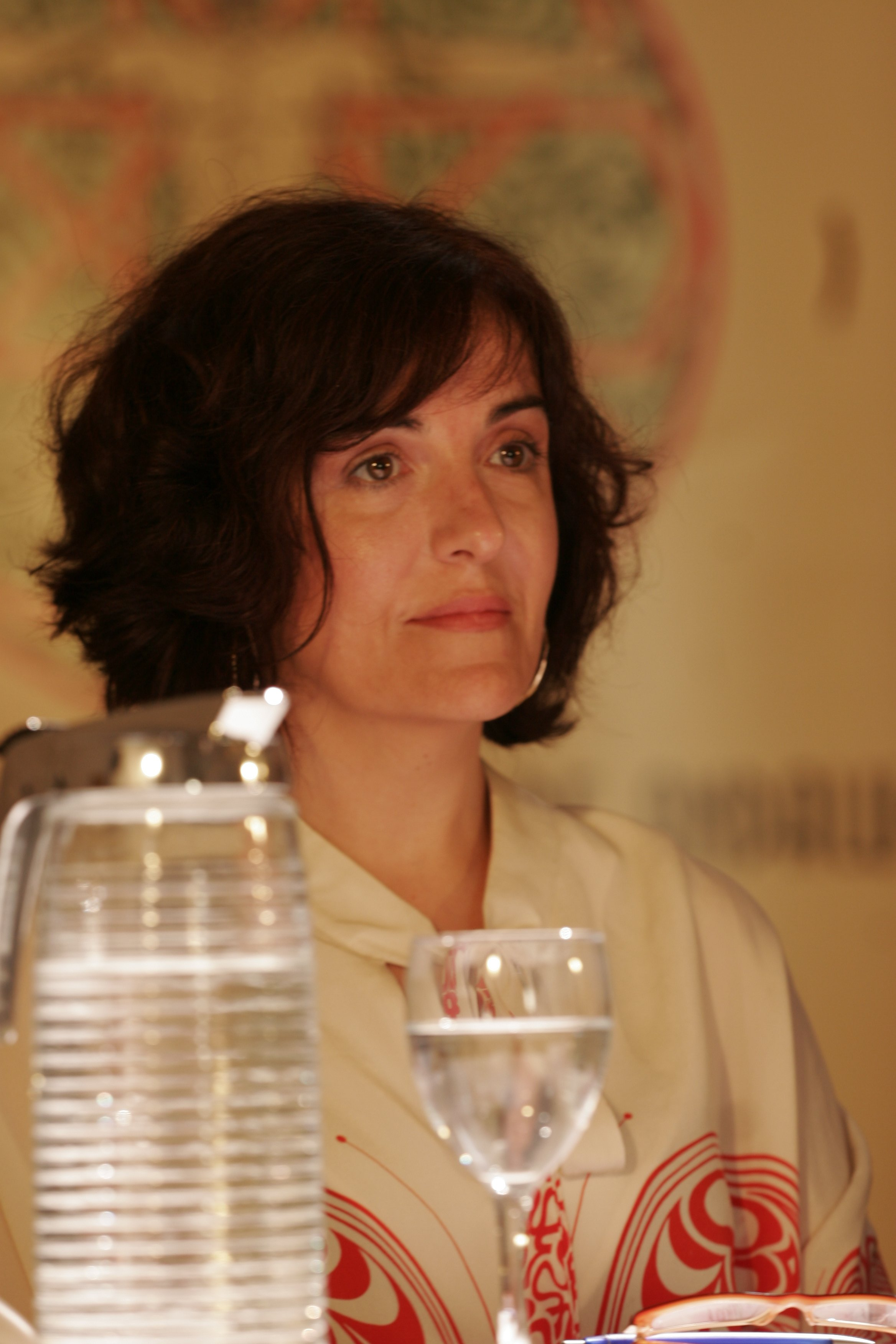
Lindo speaking at the International University of Andalusia in 2007

Lindo was born in the Andalusian city of Cádiz. At the age of 12 Lindo moved to Madrid, where she studied journalism at Complutense University of Madrid. She did not get her degree, as she began to work in television and radio as a speaker, actress and scriptwriter. Her first novel was based on one of her fictional radio characters, the Madrilenian boy Manolito Gafotas, who has become a classic of Spanish children's literature. Manolito is the son of a trucker and lives a humble life in the working-class Madrid neighborhood of Carabanchel. The character was the protagonist of several first-person novels written with a solid style that includes humour, irony and sharp social criticism.

Lindo has also written adult novels and plays; she is the screenwriter of the film La primera noche de mi vida, and collaborated with director Miguel Albaladejo on the screenplays for Manolito Four Eyes and Ataque verbal. She also adapted the screenplay Plenilune from the novel by her husband, Antonio Muñoz Molina.

Ever since her husband Antonio Muñoz Molina was appointed director of the Instituto Cervantes of New York City, Lindo has lived in New York City. She often writes for the Spanish-language newspaper El País, contributing editorials, and writes freelance work for other magazines and newspapers.

In 1998, Lindo was awarded the Premio Nacional de Literatura Infantil y Juvenil (National Award for Children's and Youth Literature) for her book Los trapos sucios de Manolito Gafotas, and she received the 2005 Premio Biblioteca Breve for her adult novel Una palabra tuya. Her next book, Lo que me queda por vivir, was released on 3 September 2010.

Lindo debuted as a film director in 2023 by co-helming Alguien que cuide de mí along with Daniela Fejerman.
