= Adriana Ozores =

Spanish actress (born 1959)

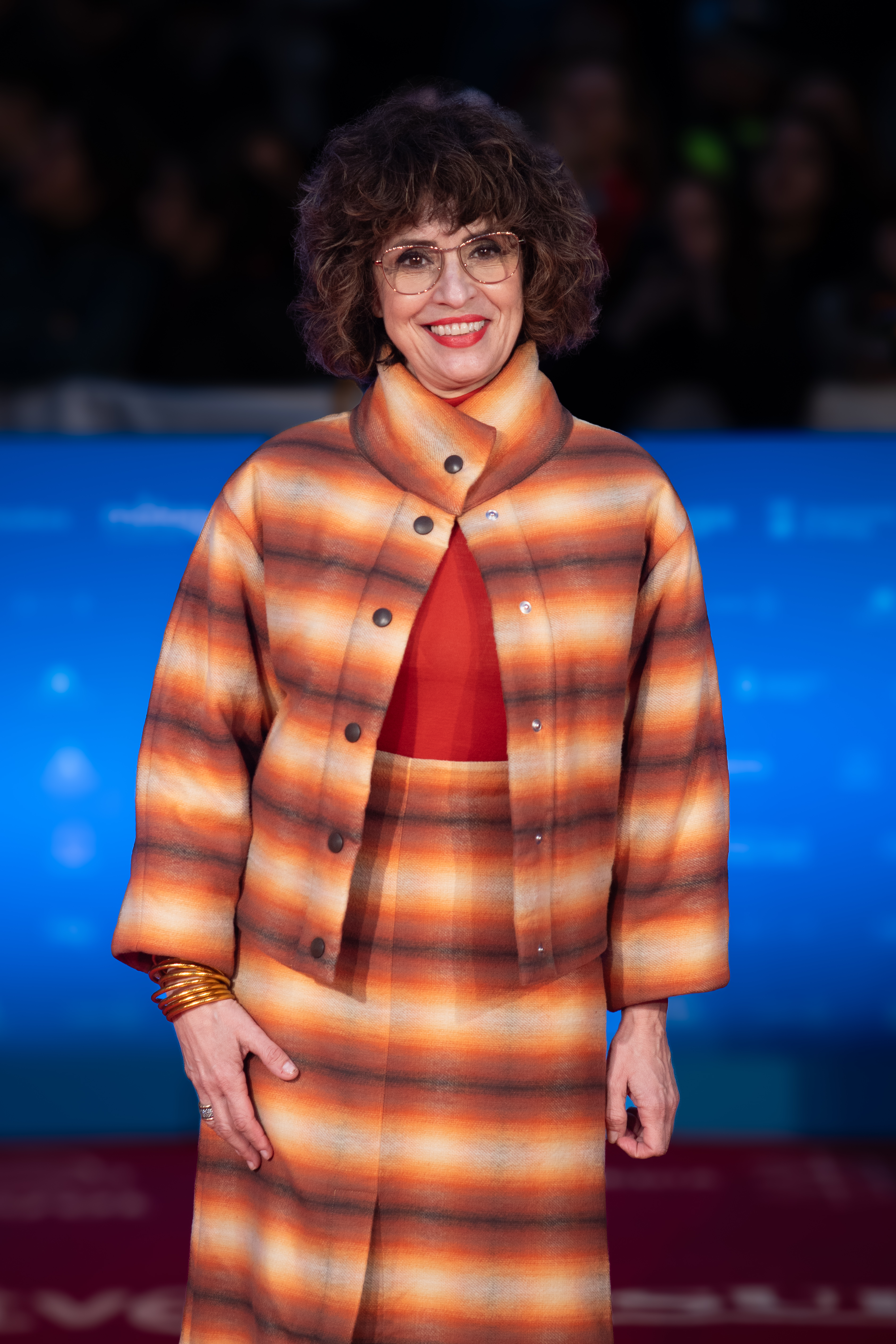
- Ozores in 2024
- Born: Adriana Ozores Muñoz; 21 May 1959 (age 67); Madrid, Spain
- Occupation: Actress
- Relatives: Antonio Ozores (uncle); Mariano Ozores (uncle)

Adriana Ozores Muñoz (Spanish pronunciation: [aˈðɾjana oˈθoɾes]; born 21 May 1959) is a Spanish theatre, film and television actress.

== Early life ==
Adriana Ozores was born in Madrid on 21 May 1959. She is the daughter of actors José Luis Ozores and Concepción Muñoz. Her father died when she was 9 years old. She is the niece of the actor Antonio Ozores and the director Mariano Ozores and cousin of the actress Emma Ozores.

== Career ==
She won the Goya Award for her role in A Time for Defiance directed by Antonio Mercero.

== Personal life ==
Ozores has a son, Adrián, by former husband Joaquín Climent.

== Selected filmography ==
Year	Title	Role	Notes	Ref.
1979	Los energéticos		Feature film debut	
1980	El liguero mágico			
1980	El canto de la cigarra			
1981	Queremos un hijo tuyo			
1981	Los chulos			
1981	Brujas mágicas			
1982	Es peligroso casarse a los 60			
1986	Cristóbal Colón, de oficio... descubridor			
1996	Niño nadie	Mari Carmen		
1996	¿De qué se ríen las mujeres?	Mari		
1998	La hora de los valientes (A Time for Defiance)	Flora		
1999	Manolito Gafotas (Manolito Four Eyes)	Catalina		
1999	Cuando vuelvas a mi lado (By My Side Again)	Ana		
2000	Plenilunio (Plenilune)	Susana Grey		
2000	Pídele cuentas al rey (Blame It on the King)	Lina		
2001	El palo (The Hold-Up)	Lola		
2002	La vida de nadie (Nobody's Life)	Ágata		
2002	El alquimista impaciente (The Impatient Alchemist)	Blanca Díez		
2002	En la ciudad sin límites (In the City Without Limits)	Pilar		
2003	La suerte dormida (Sleeping Luck)	Amparo		
2004	Héctor	Tere		
2005	El método (The Method)	Ana		
2005	Heroína (Heroine)	Pilar		
2011	No lo llames amor... llámalo X (Don't Call It Love… Call It XXX)	María		
2016	Cerca de tu casa (At Your Doorstep)	Mercedes		
2022	El comensal (The Dinner Guest)	Adela		
2023	Últimas voluntades (Last Wishes)	Agustina		
2024	Los pequeños amores (Little Loves)	Ani		
2024	Norberta	María		

== Theatre ==
- Cuatro corazones con frenos marcha atrás (1986)
- La celestina (1988)
- El vergonzoso en palacio (1989)
- La verdad sospechosa (1991–1992)
- El desdén con el desdén (1991)
- Don Gil de las calzas verdes (Tirso de Molina, 1994).
- El misántropo (1996)
- Petit Pierre (2013-2014)

== Television ==
- Los hombres de Paco (2005)
- Manolito Gafotas (TV) (Antonio Mercero, 2003)
- Periodistas
- Gran Hotel (2011-2013)
- Alba (2021)

== Accolades ==
Year	Award	Category	Work	Result	Ref.
1999	13th Goya Awards	Best Supporting Actress	A Time for Defiance	Won	
2000	14th Goya Awards	Best Supporting Actress	By My Side Again	Nominated	
2001	15th Goya Awards	Best Actress	Plenilune	Nominated	
2002	45th Valladolid International Film Festival	Best Actress	Nobody's Life	Won	
2003	17th Goya Awards	Best Actress	Nobody's Life	Nominated	
2004	18th Goya Awards	Best Actress	Sleeping Luck	Nominated	
2004	8th Málaga Film Festival	Best Actress	Héctor	Won	
2005	14th Actors and Actresses Union Awards	Best Film Actress in a Leading Role	Héctor	Won	
2006	20th Goya Awards	Best Actress	Heroine	Nominated	
2006	15th Actors and Actresses Union Awards	Best Film Actress in a Leading Role	Heroine	Nominated	
2006	15th Actors and Actresses Union Awards	Best Film Actress in a Minor Role	The Method	Won	
2011	20th Actors and Actresses Union Awards	Best Television Actress in a Leading Role	La duquesa	Won	
2012	21st Actors and Actresses Union Awards	Best Television Actress in a Leading Role	Gran Hotel	Nominated	
2013	22nd Actors and Actresses Union Awards	Best Television Actress in a Leading Role	Gran Hotel	Won	
2017	26th Actors and Actresses Union Awards	Best Film Actress in a Secondary Role	At Your Doorstep	Nominated	
2019	28th Actors and Actresses Union Awards	Best Television Actress in a Secondary Role	Velvet Colección	Nominated	
2020	29th Actors and Actresses Union Awards	Best Stage Actress in a Leading Role	Los hijos	Nominated	
2021	76th CEC Medals	Best Actress	The Invisible	Nominated	
2024	27th Málaga Film Festival	Best Supporting Actress	Little Loves	Won	
2025	17th Gaudí Awards	Best Supporting Actress	Little Loves	Nominated	
2026	9th Lola Gaos Awards	Best Actress	Blue Lights of Benidorm	Pending	
