= The Polish Rider (novel) =

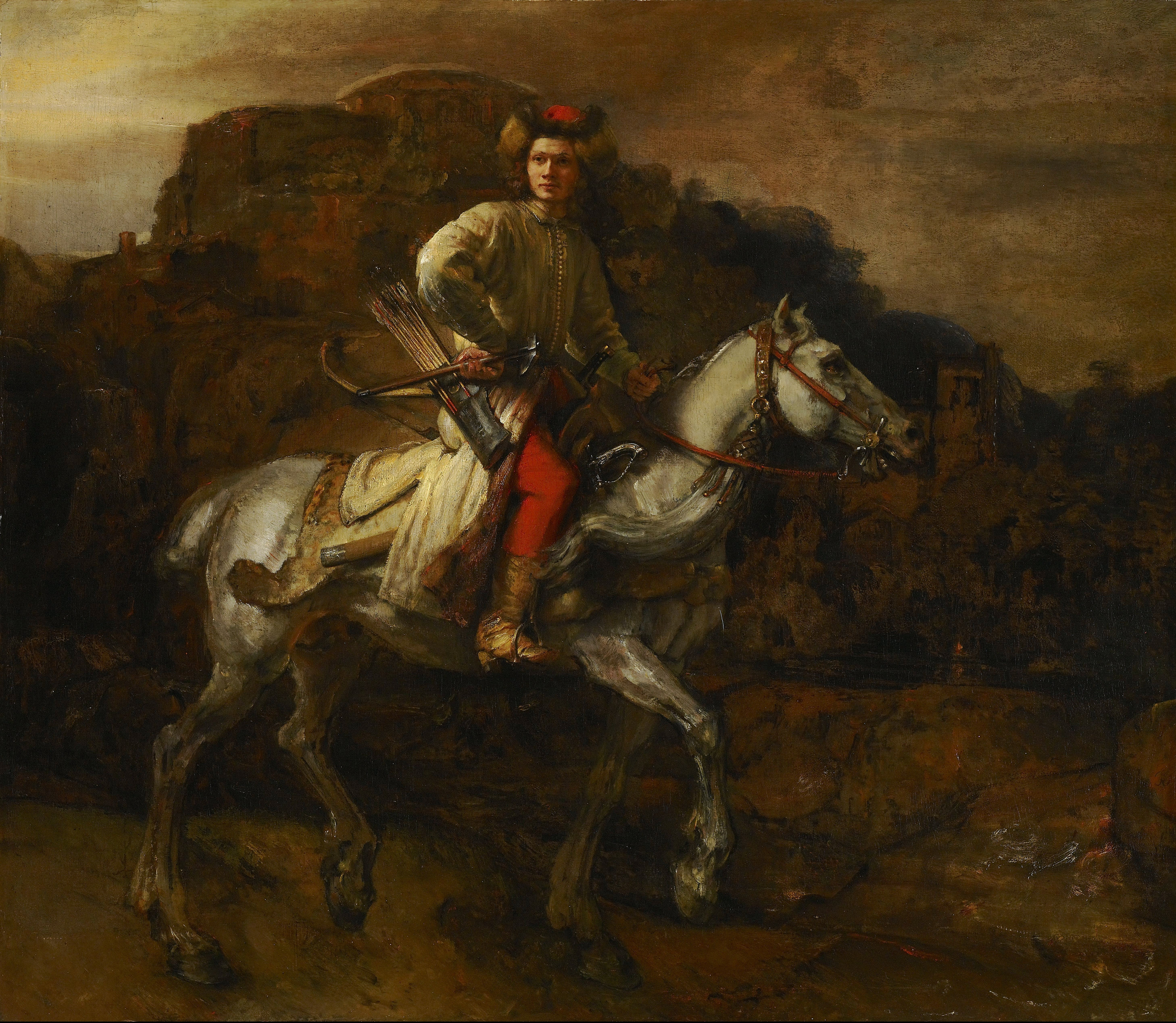
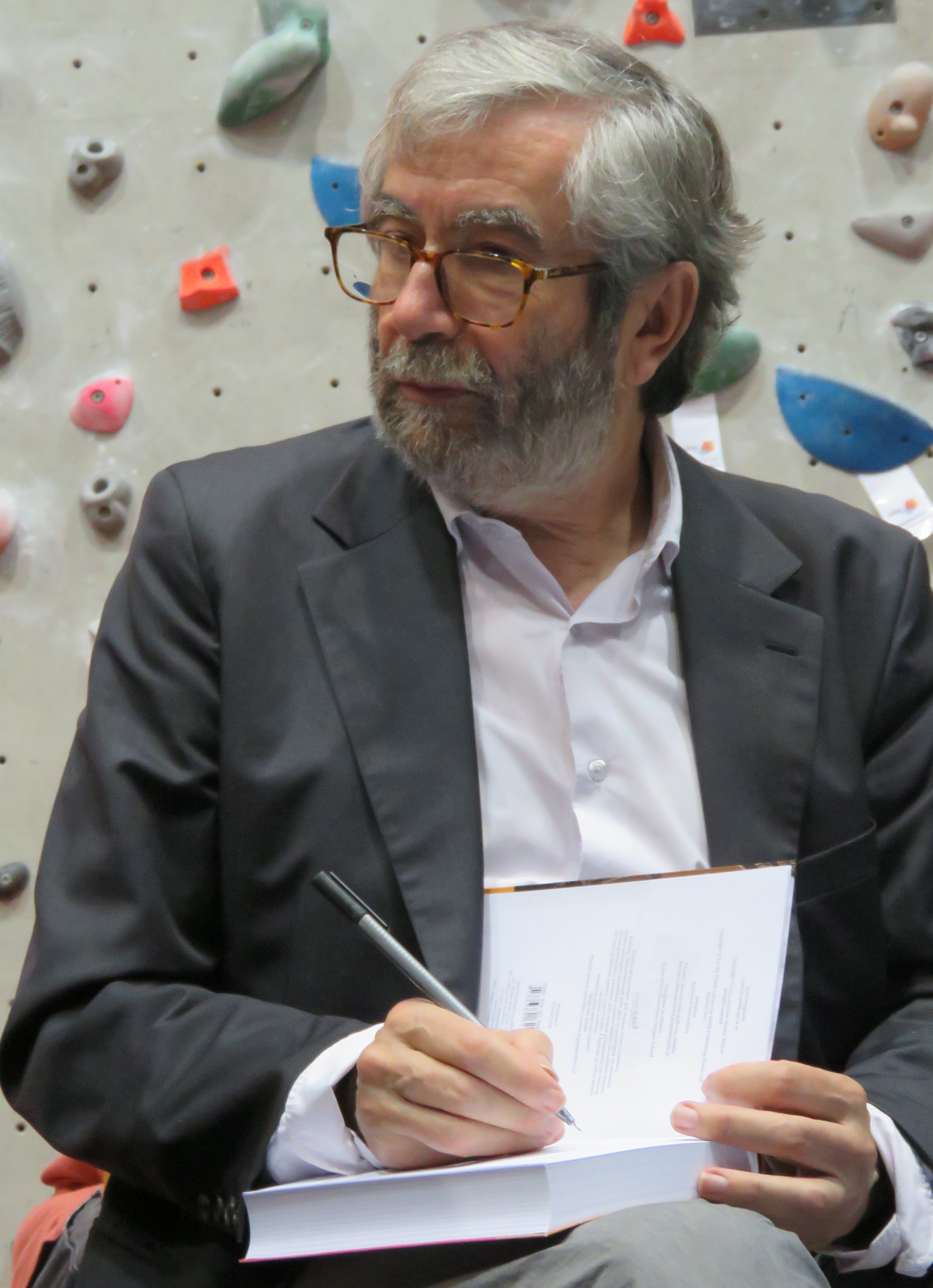

The Polish Rider (Spanish: El jinete polaco) is a Spanish novel by Antonio Muñoz Molina, published in 1991. The plot revolves around a man just about to enter mid-age reconstructing his family past, all cast against the background of a small Andalusian town. In terms of structure the narrative is non-linear; the book is a patchy structure of numerous episodes from 1870 to 1991, referred from different perspectives and in non-chronological order. In terms of style the novel is viewed as multi-genre exercise, which combines elements of detective fiction, heroic sonnet, feuilleton, realist novel, Doppelgänger, adventure story, generational saga, Bildungsroman and Gothic prose. In terms of major themes it is usually viewed as a discourse upon relationship between identity and memory, either in case of an individual or in case of the collective Spanish self. Upon release the novel was highly valued by both critics and readers; the novel earned Premio Planeta for 1991 and topped the Spanish weekly list of best selling novels from November 1991 till February 1992. In some rankings compiled today it appears among the best Spanish-language novels of the last few decades.

== Plot ==
Don Mercurio, a fresh graduate in medicine, young free-thinker, freemason and republican conspirator against the monarchy, feels compelled to flee Madrid after assassination of general Prim in 1870. He settles in an Andalusian town of Mágina, where he gets engaged in love affair with Agueda, young and beautiful wife of a local conservative and clerical aristocrat, constable Dávalos, owner of the Casa de las Torres palace. The romance is uncovered, Mercurio flees overseas, and his lover gives birth to their son. She is immured alive in 1871, while the anonymous baby is left at a religious institution. Dávalos leaves the town for ever, leaving a guardian to take care of gradually dilapidating building.

The baby, given the name of Pedro Expósito, is adopted by a poor horticultural worker. The young Pedro takes part in the 1890s war in Cuba and returns to Mágina almost simultaneously with his father; in the early 20th century Don Mercurio tries to find out what happened to his son and he apparently succeeds, but Pedro refuses to learn who his parents were. Don Mercurio resumes his practice as a physician, unaware of the fate of his lover. Pedro gets married and has many children, one of them Leonor, in the 1920s the most handsome girl in Mágina. Sometime in the late 1920s she marries Manuel, a humble worker; the couple work hard in horticulture and have 7 children.

An unrelated major Galaz, posted to the Mágina garrison in April 1936, single-handedly prevents rebellion of local troops and shots a lieutenant suspected of leading the plot. He then fights in the Republican army, to leave Spain after the war. Manuel spends the war in ranks of Guardia de Asalto fighting the rebels in nearby mountains; at the day of Nationalist takeover of the town he reports on duty as usual - against the advice of his father-in-law Pedro - and gets immediately arrested; he spends 2 years in a Francoist labor camp.

In 1941 an accidental explosion in half-ruined and uninhabited Casa de las Torres reveals a hidden chamber with the perfectly mummified corps of Agueda Dávalos. Don Mercurio arranges for the mummy to be secretly taken to his place, where because of its rapid disintegration he orders a wax copy; remnants of the mummy are secretly burnt. Don Mercurio dies in few years; his wagon-driver inherits the lab, which for decades remains unused. The love for mummified woman is cultivated by Ramiro the Portraitist, a photographer who unaware of its history cherishes the photograph of mummified corpse he made when discovered in 1941.

A daughter of Manuel and Leonor marries Francisco, a humble Mágina farmer, in the early 1950s. They live extremely laborious, hard and uneventful life, and have one child, Manuel, born in 1956. He grows fed up with provincial town, fascinated by English rock. In 1973, drunk and high on drugs, he probably has sex with Nadia, daughter to comandante Galaz, then librarian in a New York university, who following death of his second wife decides to visit Mágina. Galaz and Nadia leave Mágina shortly; she starts work in tourist business, he becomes a pensioner in a nursery house in New Jersey.

Manuel completes linguistics study in the late 1970s and becomes a simultaneous interpreter, working mostly for the European Parliament in Brussels. He is increasingly detached from his family and town, but does not take root elsewhere and becomes sort of a perfect alien to wherever he lives. Nadia gets married in the US, gives birth and gets divorced when in 1990 she bumps into Manuel at a conference in Madrid. She recognizes him; the two have sex. In two months Manuel arranges for a professional trip to the US, where he finds Nadia; the two meet again and have sex again, apparently in love. In 1991 he returns to Mágina in wake of death of his grandmother Leonor, while Nadia decides she would take a temporary employment in Madrid. Manuel discovers the true story of Agueda and Mercurio, revealed by old Don Mercurio's wagon-driver. Nadia comes to Mágina; Manuel meets her and the two go to a hotel.

== Characters ==
- Agueda Dávalos (1850?-1871), great-great-grandmother of Manuel, highly aristocratic young lady, married to owner of the Casa de las Torres estate in Mágina; she engaged in a romance with Don Mercurio and got pregnant; after giving birth to a boy she was immured alive by her betrayed husband. Her mummified corps, in perfect shape, was accidentally found in 1941; it was later stolen by Don Mercurio; having noticed the mummy was disintegrating he ordered a wax copy; before the mummy fell apart its remnants were burnt by Juliano
- colonel Bilbao (?-1936), commander of the Mágina garrison, unkempt, chaotic, poor officer, disappointed with his children, highly affectionate towards Galaz, whom he would have welcomed as his own son; on the day of the coup in July 1936 he could not make his mind and kept drinking; once Galaz took control of the garrison and ensured its loyalty to the Republic, Bilbao – totally drunk – shot himself
- The Butcher (1930?-1974), a bull-fighter; actual name and surname not mentioned, son to a butcher from Mágina who owned a stand next to this of Manuel's father; enjoyed nationwide but brief fame some time in the 1950s or 1960s; used to show up in Mágina in a flashy cabrio with glitzy women; for Manuel he epitomized a person who broke away from Magina mediocre life to fame; earned a modest monument in Mágina dotted with verses written by Florencio Perez
- lieutenant Chamorro (born around 1915), drafted into the army he served as corporal in Mágina in July 1936; he delated military conspirators to major Galaz; entered the militia and in its ranks fought the Nationalists in the mountains; sent to Popular Military School in Barcelona he graduated as lieutenant, after the war arrested by the Francoists, spent 14 years behind bars; he tried to organize an assault on Franco in the nearby Sierra and ended up in jail 22 days after his release from prison. In the 1960s and 1970s he was manual worker employed by Manuel's father, whom he befriended. He was friend also to Florencio Peréz, who visited Chamorro regularly to lock him up as potentially subversive rebel. In the 1980s and 1990s a belligerent activist for an unnamed progressist movement
- Domingo González (born in the 1910s), a young Falangist in the mid-1930s; fleeing the Republican manhunt in 1936 he went into hiding. He fled Mágina in 1937 and returned after the war already as colonel, in the 1940s and perhaps later serving as ruthless prosecutor and maybe judge. In revenge he was blinded by an unnamed individual, who burnt his eyes out and promised to return to kill him; until the end of his days he lived in fear, went mad, left the city and resided in a ruined shelter in the countryside
- Donald Fernández (1955?-1989?), a Colombian, petty drug dealer and painter in Paris in the 1980s, where he befriended Manuel; shortly enjoyed some sort of success, as his fictitious African landscapes were displayed in New York; later he was sacked from work and robbed, lived begging and contracted AIDS; somehow he made it to his dream-land Africa, where he felt happy and from where he tried in vain to contact Manual by phone; his corpse was found – with smile on his face – below a tree in natural reserve of wild animals in Kenya; except Manuel he did not interface with any characters from Mágina
- father of Manuel, Francisco (born 1928); surname not mentioned; nothing is known of his parents, though he descended from a poor humble family; in the mid-1940s he started dating a sister of his mate, whom he married in the early 1950s; worked hard in horticulture, for decades waking up at 4 AM to open a stand in Mágina; in the early 1960s he purchased a larger plot and turned it from waste-land into a flourishing area, yet in the early 1970s still wanted to sell it and get employment as a gardener in a hotel somewhere in a tourist area, the plan thwarted by his health problems; disciplined, humble, withdrawn and extremely laborious man, though with occasional drink frenzy; visited his son in Madrid in the mid-1970s; in the 1990s he purchased a van and was very proud of his business, though the plot was already neglected
- Felix (born 1956), a boy from a poor family from Mágina who in their early childhood befriended Manuel; timid and withdrawn, he was tempted by letters and did not accompany other boys in their pursuit of alcohol and girls; he studied Greek and Latin literature, settled in Granada and taught linguistics at the local University; got married, had children; still friend to Manuel, in the early 1990s he was uneasy about the latter's distaste for Mágina
- Florencio Pérez Tallante (1910-1990), a young policeman in the mid-1930s, he was somewhat accidentally arrested in July 1936; thanks to Chamorro who intervened on his behalf he was released by Galaz, crossed the frontline and joined the Nationalists; after the war served as police chief in Mágina, though apparently not engaged in repression. His passion was poetry; he wrote banal and bombastic pieces, at times published anonymously. Married and widowed, he was respected neither by his family not by his subordinates. He frequently visited Chamorro, formally as part of police vigilance and to briefly detain him, but in fact to chat and drink. Leader of local Acción Católica. He intended to visit Galaz in 1973, but apparently failed to do so; instead, he released Nadia from captivity when she had been detained by two secret Francoist agents. Having retired he started to write memoirs, and then “memoirs from the future”. He was profoundly disappointed about his son, who instead of becoming a priest grew long hair and played guitar; in the 1990s his son indeed became a pop star
- Gabriela (born around 1900?), second guardian of Casa de las Torres and daughter to the first guardian; in 1936 she picked up a hand grenade dropped by republican militiamen and hid it in the Casa; the grenade exploded accidentally in 1941 and revealed the mummy of Agueda Dávalos; she gradually went mad and was removed to live in another part of the city, though she kept carrying stones from the Casa until it was turned into the local arts school
- comandante Galaz (1904-1991), descendant to a military dynasty, serious and withdrawn as a child, served gallantly in Morocco in the 1920s; studied in Sandhurst; married the most beautiful girl in Ceuta and daughter to a general; he had one son and his wife was pregnant with another when in April 1936 and freshly promoted to major he was assigned to Mágina; at that time he already did not love his wife. He was disliked among fellow Mágina officers as a stickler and was not invited to take part in conspiracy. During the coup of July 1936 he was enraged to see breach of discipline and in a public showdown he shot dead lieutenant Mestalla, who refused to follow his orders. He left Mágina and served in the Republican army, considered traitor by his family. Migrated to US and worked as librarian in a mediocre New York university. In 1955 he married a fellow librarian of Irish descent (nothing is known of his divorce with the Ceuta wife), a Catholic depressed with her divorce. He wanted his wife to abort pregnancy, which ended up in birth of Nadia. Following a 1973 premature death of his wife Galaz and Nadia visited Mágina. He was visited by Ramiro the Portraitist, who asked Galaz to take care of a chest with photographs he had made throughout all his life; Galaz agreed, but did not seem particularly interested He started drinking. Following return to US he sold his flat and spent the rest of his days in a nursery house in New Jersey, his relations with Nadia closer than ever
- Juanito (born 1956), Manuel's classmate, intellectually disabled, in teen-years inclined to girls but ridiculed, in the 1990s he was selling from a street-stand, already unable to recognize Manuel
- Juliano (born around 1910), he worked as wagon-driver for Don Mercurio; in 1941 on his order he secretly removed the freshly found mummy to Don Mercurio's premises; he was sort-of adopted by Don Mercurio and inherited all his belongings, including the wax copy of the mummy. He later served as taxi-driver, in 1973 drove Nadia from police station home, in the late 1980s he was placed by his daughter in a local nursery house and his daughter sold the wax figure; in 1991 he revealed the true story of the mummy to Manuel
- Leonor (1910?-1991), grandmother of Manuel, daughter to Pedro Expósito; as the most handsome girl in Mágina she married Manuel (the grandfather); the couple had 7 children, including the future mother of Manuel; she spent most of her days weaving mattresses and helping her husband; in elderly years senile but conscious and still trying to take care of her husband, she spent hours on the sofa staring at the TV screen
- Lorencio Quesada (born around 1920), known as Lorencito, by profession a shop-assistant in El Sistema Métrico shop and by vocation a journalist, correspondent of a local Singlatura newspaper; in the 1940s a beginner, in the 1990s dean of the local press corps; author of a serialized novel about the mummy; he intended to publish memoirs of Florencio Pérez and organize exhibition of Ramiro the Portraitist's photographs, but failed
- Marina (born 1956), Manuel's classmate, his first love; she realized, liked and perhaps cultivated his affection, but in fact played with him; she preferred slightly older men and did not reject their advances, frequented bars and clubs; unlike in case of many of Manuel's schoolmates, her further fate is not known, she might have left Mágina
- lieutenant Mestalla (1910?-1936), the only officer in the Mágina garrison who liked and admired Galaz, though his admiration turned into hate in wake of the 1936 coup; he openly challenged Galaz, refused to step back into line in front of the troops, and was shot dead by Galaz
- Manuel (born 1956), the key protagonist and partially storyteller; spent his youth between school and hard work assisting his father in the horticulture business; since the late 1960s till 1973 in love with Marina; as a teenager hated provincial milieu of his native Mágina and gradually also the humble submitted life of his family; fond of English and American rock music he developed a knack for foreign languages; in 1973 first came to know Nadia and perhaps – drunk and high on drugs – had sex with her; in the late 1970s studied languages in Madrid, worked as simultaneous interpreter in Paris and since the mid-1980s in Brussels, following Spain's entry to the EU; did not marry, had no children, rented flats, led a chaotic life of a permanent foreigner, increasingly detached from his family and Spain. Narrowly escaped death during a car near-miss in Spain in 1991. Shortly afterwards he met Nadia by chance during an international conference and had sex with her, 2 months later taking advantage of another conference and meeting her in New York. Kept investigating the mummy story, discussed in the family, and in 1991 - already re-united with his native town- he learnt the truth from Julian the taxi-driver. The last known about him is that in love with Nadia he waited for her to arrive in Mágina, booked a hotel room for her, and they would soon have sex there
- grandfather Manuel (born 1903), maternal grandfather of Manuel, until the mid-1930s he worked as manual worker in local estate; married to Leonor, they had 7 children; always in favor of order and law, highly emotional, moved to tears equally by left-wing and right-wing songs; during the Civil War he joined Guardia de Asalto and served on the frontline; after Nationalist takeover of Mágina he reported on duty only to be detained and spent 2 years in labor camp; released, he walked 24 hours to get back home; during Francoism he worked the horticultural plot, later paid also the Guardia de Asalto pension. Tended to violence towards his children, when drunk posed a threat to his family. Later worked with his son-in-law, in elderly years he got fat and hardly conscious spent hours on the sofa watching TV, wrapped in diapers
- Matías (born around 1930?), a dumb assistant of Ramiro the Portraitist; as a youngster he was buried alive in a house hit by a mortar shell, when rescued he no longer spoke
- mother of Manuel (born 1930), no first name mentioned, humble woman who spent all her life working either in the field or weaving; daughter to Manuel the grandfather and mother to Manuel, the novel protagonist. Did not expect anything from life; when since mid-1940s adored by her future husband she was surprised that anyone paid attention to her; got married in the early-1950s. Hardly literate, in the 1980s started to learn to improve her learning skills. Highly religious
- Medinilla (born around 1920?), petty juridical official and police delator in the 1940s, after the fall of Francoism elected to the Cortes
- Don Mercurio (1850?-1947), great-great-grandfather of Manuel, a free-thinker liberal and perhaps masonic republican conspirator, freshly graduated physician who fled Madrid and settled in Mágina in 1870; romanced with Agueda Dávalos, once the affair had been detected he fled to live in the Philippines and Cuba; returned around 1900 he found no trace of his lover; practiced in Mágina; tried to identify his son Pedro Exposito and apparently succeeded, though the latter has never agreed to meet him; in 1941 by accident he found the mummified corps of his one-time lover, stole it and ordered a wax copy of it; remained a free-thinker who hated the church and the clergy; when dying he asked for Song of Songs (in the Lutheran version) to be read aloud to him by Julian
- Nadia Allison vel Nadia Galaz (born 1955), daughter to comandante Galaz and an Irish mother, born in New York and raised in dual English-Spanish culture; had car-back-seat sex with local boys before in 1973 she accompanied her father to Spain; romanced with Praxis, detained by secret police but released by Florencio Pérez; dumped by Praxis she turned her attention to Manuel; perhaps she had sex with totally drunk and high-on-drugs Manuel; lived employed in tourist business in US and Spain, married a US citizen Bob Allison and in the 1980s had a son with him; had extra-marital sex before divorce, perhaps once she met her half-siblings in Madrid; had many sex-affairs until she turned her attention to Manuel, met accidentally during a conference on tourism in Madrid in 1991; she arranged for an intimate encounter letting him to believe he was the decision-maker; accepted his endeavours few months later in US and took a temporary job in Madrid, apparently in love with him; the novel ends with her coming by bus to Mágina in 1991 to have sex with Manuel in a hotel
- Otto Zenner (1890?-?), a Mágina photographer, in the early 20th century a painter adhering to a boheme lifestyle in Berlin; during WW1 he served as sergeant in the German army, afterwards tried his hand as photographer in Berlin, but fled during revolution, fearing the advance of bolshevism; he settled in Mágina, where in the 1920s and 1930s he practiced as a photographer; has never married; fascinated by Nadar; Ramiro the Portraitist was his apprentice; a spiritist who collected pornographic postcards, he used to get drunk with German schnaps when listening to Schubert; in 1941, following outbreak of the Nazi-Soviet war, he left Mágina in full 1918 military gear to fight the Bolsheviks; nothing certain is known of him later, though according to one account he engaged in altercation with Guardia Civil and spend the rest of his days somewhere in a madhouse in Spain
- Patricio Pavón Pacheco (born 1956), Manuel's classmate, determined to be a gangster and interested in girls, shady deals, night clubs and alcohol; already as member of the local underworld he introduced Manuel into the nightlife in the early 1970s; nothing is known of him after the date
- Pedro Expósito (1871-1953), Manuel's great-grandfather, illegitimate son of Don Mercurio and Agueda Dávalos; as a baby left at a religious institution, he was adopted by a poor horticultural worker in Mágina; fought in Cuba in the 1890s (where he might have met his father), when approached by someone who suggested he meets his biological parents and gets rich he refused; married an unnamed local woman who widowed 4 times and had 18 children; they were the parents of Leonor
- uncle Pepe (born 1920s?), son of Manual the grandfather and Leonor, by the end of Civil War drafted into the Republican cavalry; when on mule he simply turned back and returned to Mágina, later worked as paid employee in the horticultural business of his nephew
- Praxis (born 1940?), also José Manuel or Manu, teacher of literature dismissed from Madrid and as a penalty measure settled in Mágina, where he taught Manuel; practiced innovative teaching methods and in front of students posed as a friend; engaged in romance with Nadia in 1973, but pressed by his girl-friend terminated the affair; perhaps suffered some persecution in 1974; in the 1990s a deputy to the Cortes he felt the need "to defend the Western culture"
- uncle Rafael (1910s?-1970s?), paternal uncle of Manuel, drafted into the army in the mid-1930s he was about to complete his term when the Civil War broke out; served in the Republican army, and as the Nationalists refused to recognise his service also in the Francoist one, 10 years in the army in total; worked with his brother in horticultural business; when his donkey was hit by a thunder he died shortly afterwards
- cousin Rafael (1940s?), son of uncle Rafael, during mid-Francoism he left Mágina for Madrid in pursuit of better life; ended up as a bus-driver in Madrid, living in a condo block in Leganes, he remained confident that he made a right step and was happy with his life
- Ramiro the Portraitist (1910?-?), initially apprentice to Otto Zenner; in 1936 he made a photo of Galaz reporting to alcalde the loyalty of the troops; he inherited the lab and the business from Zenner in 1941; also in 1941 he fell in love with the mummy of Agueda Dávalos, cherished as a photo image and memory throughout the rest of his life; kept making photos throughout 40 years, carefully picturing all Mágina citizens but himself staying out of focus; initially a spiritist but disillusioned later; used to emulate his master when getting drunk with schnaps and listening to Schubert; his business went into decline with arrival of color photography in the late 1960s; in 1973 he presented the chest with photos he had made to Galaz and left Mágina, disrespectful about the city which did not appreciate his work; he became a street photographer in Madrid.

== See also ==
- Antonio Muñoz Molina
- The Polish Rider
- Úbeda
