= Heroine (2005 film) =

- Theatrical release poster
- Spanish: Heroína
- Directed by: Gerardo Herrero
- Screenplay by: Ángeles González-Sinde
- Produced by: Pancho Casal; Mariela Besuievsky
- Starring: Adriana Ozores; Javier Pereira; María Bouzas; Carlos Blanco
- Cinematography: Alfredo Mayo
- Edited by: Carmen Frías
- Music by: Lucio Godoy
- Production companies: Continental Producciones; Tornasol Films
- Distributed by: Alta Films
- Release date: 6 May 2005
- Running time: 100 minutes
- Country: Spain
- Language: Spanish

Heroine (Spanish: Heroína) is a 2005 Spanish drama film directed by Gerardo Herrero from a screenplay by Ángeles González-Sinde which stars Adriana Ozores.

== Plot ==
The plot is set in the late 1980s in Galicia, tracking the plight of Pilar, a mother worried for her son, heroin addict Fito.

== Cast ==
- Adriana Ozores as Pilar
- Javier Pereira as Fito
- Carlos Blanco as Germán
- María Bouzas as Fina
- Luis Iglesia as Juanjo
- César Cambeiro as José
- Camila Bossa as Gloria
- Víctor Vázquez as Manuel
- Miguel Bua as Esteban
- Tamara Canosa as Nati
- Mercedes Castro as Sofía

== Production ==
Shooting locations included Vigo and Pontevedra.

== Accolades ==
Year	Award	Category	Nominee(s)	Result	Ref.
2006	20th Goya Awards	Best Actress	Adriana Ozores	Nominated	
2006	4th Mestre Mateo Awards	Best Film		Nominated	
2006	4th Mestre Mateo Awards	Best Actress	Adriana Ozores	Nominated	
2006	4th Mestre Mateo Awards	Best Supporting Actor	Carlos Blanco	Won	
2006	4th Mestre Mateo Awards	Best Supporting Actress	María Bouzas	Won	
2006	4th Mestre Mateo Awards	Best Production Supervision	Josean Gómez	Nominated	
2006	4th Mestre Mateo Awards	Best Cinematography	Alfredo Mayo	Nominated	
2006	4th Mestre Mateo Awards	Best Costume Design	Estíbaliz Markiegi, Marta Anta	Nominated	
2006	4th Mestre Mateo Awards	Best Art Direction	Marta Villar	Nominated	
2006	4th Mestre Mateo Awards	Best Soundtrack	Lucio Godoy	Nominated	
2006	15th Actors and Actresses Union Awards	Best Film Actress in a Leading Role	Adriana Ozores	Nominated	

== See also ==
- List of Spanish films of 2005
