= La dama velata =

Television series

- Genre: Period drama
- Directed by: Carmine Elia
- Starring: Miriam Leone; Lino Guanciale; Andrea Bosca; Jaime Olías; Luciano Virgilio; Lucrezia Lante della Rovere; Emma Orlandini; Úrsula Corberó; Mar Regueras
- Composer: Paolo Buonvino
- Countries of origin: Italy; Spain
- No. of seasons: 1
- No. of episodes: 12

Original release
- Network: Rai 1 (Italy); Telecinco (Spain)
- Release: March 17 – April 16, 2015

La dama velata is a 2015 Italian-Spanish mystery drama television miniseries directed by Carmine Elia. It was produced by Rai Fiction, Lux Vide and Telecinco Cinema, with a budget of about 10 million euros. It is set in Trentino, in the late nineteenth century. In Italy, the series was broadcast on Rai 1 and Rai 1 HD from March 17 to April 16, 2015.

== Plot ==
Clara, a splendid young woman belonging to the noble Grandi family, is raised by the peasants of the San Leonardo estate where she was born. She grew up free from society and established a very intimate relationship with Matteo, an orphan raised with her by the Staineri spouses. Years later, Count Vittorio Grandi, the young woman's father, forces her to return to Trento where the destiny of spending her life with a man imposed upon her awaits her. Count Guido Fossà, a womanizer in debt from head to toe, is the man chosen for her and, although not easy and not at all obvious, love is born between the two. The same love that turned Clara into a woman risks making her unhappy forever, in a context of secrets and plots against her life. The darkness that has entered her life endangers her, eventually making her mentally ill. Clara is locked up in the city mental health institution for hysteria, but manages to escape. Someone pushes her into the waters of the Adige, leaving her to drown and staging a suicide.

Believed to be suicidal by all, Clara is saved by the nuns of the convent of the estate and after recovering she assumes the identity of a Swiss noblewoman. With her face hidden by a black veil she manages to return to her home as a piano teacher to her daughter, Aurora. In this way she is able to reveal the secrets that have loomed over her since the night her mother died giving her life and to protect her daughter.

== Cast ==
- Countess Clara Maria Elena Grandi married Fossà portrayed by Miriam Leone.

Daughter of Count Vittorio Grandi and his wife Elena, and Matteo's fraternal twin sister, she was raised by the Staineri family, factors of the San Leonardo estate after the death of her mother, which occurred due to complications during childbirth. She has a very intimate relationship with Matteo, an orphan of the same age (born on the same day) raised by the Staineri family, the two do not know that they are actually fraternal twins. When her father comes, years later, to learn about the relationship between the two of them, he brings back his daughter back to Trento, and decides that she will get married so that he will have a male heir for the house of Grandi. Clara marries Count Guido Fossà at the behest of her father. There is attraction between the two, but the arranged marriage and the Count's dark past hinder the relationship between the two. Despite this, the count learns to love Clara deeply, but he never manages to be completely honest with her. Aurora, their only daughter, is born, but not even the happy event brings serenity to the family. Clara falls victim to the plots of her aunt and cousin who manage, thanks to them slowly drugging her with laudanum on making herself and other people believe that she is going crazy, and to have her locked up in an asylum from which she will escape, thanks to some help, in order to cause her own accident, making everyone believe, that she fell into the Adige river and died. Subsequently, to discover the secrets hidden within her own family, Clara will pretend to be of Emilia of Saint-Hubert, a Swiss noblewoman. She will also manage to exonerate Guido from the accusations of crimes he has not committed, and take revenge on her own aunt Adelaide and cousin Cornelio.

- Count Guido Andrea Fossà portrayed by Lino Guanciale.

Son of Count Fossà, he is a womanizer, full of debts and with a dark past. He marries Clara, but continues to lead a worldly lifestyle, but later on he will develop a feeling of true and sincere love towards his wife, which will radically change him. However, he hides various secrets concerning his mysterious past: the death of his first wife in Paris and the death of his business partner and friend, Baron Ludovico Vallauri. He is also accused of Clara's murder. It is Clara herself, who wanders around their house under the false name of Emilia of Saint-Hubert, as the educator of their only-begotten daughter, Aurora, - who finds in her drawer the bottle of laudanum that had poisoned her, as she believes really that Guido is guilty and instigator of his murder. Sentenced to death by shooting, he confesses to Clara, in the guise of Emilia, the whole truth about her history and his innocence. Clara manages to save him by tracking down in France and making confess Gèrard, an old friend who blackmailed Guido by threatening to reveal details about the death of his first wife (who actually committed suicide). During the confession to Clara, Guido reveals that he has sold his share of the silk factory to guarantee an annuity for his daughter and that in his will, he has left the estate of San Leonardo to Matteo and his wife to administrate until Aurora reached the age of majority, thus preventing its sale by Adelaide and Cornelio.

- Cornelio Grandi portrayed by Andrea Bosca.

Cousin of Clara and Matteo, and son of Adelaide, he is the administrator of his uncle Vittorio, as well as pretender to the latter's inheritance. Cornelio is violent and opportunistic, he pretends to be Guido's best friend but actually he actively collaborates in his misfortunes. He was raised by his mother in the expectation of becoming the sole heir of the Grandi family. He gets peasant Anita pregnant, and doesn't take responsibility for it. Once he has become the keeper of the family's fortune, Cornelio makes everyone believe that his mother is crazy, even going so far as to have her locked up in an asylum when she becomes obsessed with the "ghost" of Clara, who in the role of Emilia is actually plotting her revenge, making herself seen only by her.

- Matteo Staineri/Matteo Grandi portrayed by Jaime Olías.

Matteo is an orphan, but he was raised together with Clara her fraternal twin sister by the Staineri family. He loves Clara dearly and for this he deeply hates whoever speaks ill of or wants to hurt her. Matteo has very strong conflicts with Count Grandi, with Guido, but above all else with Cornelio after the death of Count Grandi. He is chased from the estate by Cornelio, who wants to sell to pocket the value. It turns out that he is Clara's fraternal twin brother, therefore a legitimate heir even if he is second born. Adelaide had stolen him from the arms of her dying mother, in order to then kill him in the Adige, wanting to favor her son Cornelius. However, the basket gets entangled in a reed bed near a nunnery. Matteo enters the service of the Foreigners - above the estate - and is raised by them as a son together with Clara and Anita, the only daughter of the Foreigners. He later marries Anita, and they raise hers and Cornelio son : Giovannino, as their own.

- Count Vittorio Grandi portrayed by Luciano Virgilio.

Clara's father, devastated by the death of his wife, refuses to see his daughter and entrusts her to the peasants of the San Leonardo estate (a possession brought to him as a dowry by his wife), as he holds Clara responsible for his wife's death. On the surface he is a stern, rigid and oppressive man. But actually he's a man who suffered greatly from the loss of the woman he loved. The birth of his granddaughter Aurora will awaken the good of the past in him. He has a heart condition, and he dies of a heart attack in the middle of the series.

- Adelaide portrayed by Lucrezia Lante della Rovere.

Wife of the deceased brother of Count Vittorio Grandi and the mother of Cornelio, she is a ruthless and greedy woman and demands that her son inherit the wealth and the title of her brother-in-law. She is the architect of the "misfortunes" of the family : she foments Count Grandi's hatred for her daughter, promoting Cornelio in the eyes of her brother-in-law; she slowly poisons Clara after Aurora's birth, managing to make her declare mad and have Guido - unable to understand - accuse her of her death and her disappearance. At the end of the series she will be interned in the mental hospital in Trento by her son Cornelio.

- Aurora Fossà, portrayed by Emma Orlandini.

Only daughter of Clara and Guido, she appears for the first time in the 5th episode. Aurora has a very close bond with her maternal grandfather, and with Matteo's son, Giovannino.

- Anita Staineri, portrayed by Úrsula Corberó.

Peasant woman, friend of Clara and daughter of the superiors of San Leonardo. She grows up with the latter and with Matteo, with whom she has always been in love. She is the victim of the attentions of Cornelio, with whom she will have a son, Giovannino. She later marries Matteo, and the man "adopts" Giovannino as his son.

- Countess Matilde Grandi, portrayed by Mar Regueras.

Count Grandi's sister and Clara's paternal aunt. She is a painter and a modern woman, as she has always refused to marry to live her life freely and travel. She loves Clara as a daughter and is one of her few confidants. She is the only one to whom Clara reveals that she is not dead as everyone believes and aids her in her investigation, constantly fearing for her safety.

== Episodes ==
Season	Episodes	Year of release
Season 1	12	2015

=== Episode 1: Radici spezzate (Broken roots) ===
The series opens with a flashback of Clara's childhood from her birth in San Leonardo to her return to Trento. We discover right away that Clara has a male fraternal twin, but at first we don't know much about the baby's life after his birth, we are only told that he is still alive, that he was found by nuns soon after their birth, and that his name is Matteo. Clara is educated in San Leonardo by reading her mother's books and keeping in touch with her paternal aunt. She has never seen her father, and uses her mother's silverware to purchase quinine to cure farmers of a potential cholera epidemic. Her cousin Cornelio manages the estate on behalf of Clara's father and treats everyone with contempt; he does not take into account his cousin, he then discovers the shortage of silver and reveals to his uncle that his cousin wants to escape and marry Matteo. It is precisely during one of Cornelio's unwelcome visits that Clara meets the young Guido Fossà - who remains bewitched by her. Cornelio wants to use Guido to convince the chief engineer of the railways to buy the estate to transform it into a coal storage area. Count Grandi, under the threat of having Matteo arrested for the theft of the silver, forces Clara to return to Trento and informs her that he will give her in marriage to have a male heir to whom he can leave their fortune. Arriving in Trento, Clara meets Adelaide, Count Vittorio Grandi's sister-in-law and Cornelio's mother, who seems to be taking care of her.

=== Episode 2: Nella casa paterna (Inside the paternal house) ===
Clara meets Carlotta, a distant cousin of hers, and betrothed to Baron Vallauri who invites her to his engagement party. Clara plans her escape with Matteo by taking advantage of Carlotta's engagement party. A little awkward at the dance in front of the nobility of Trento, Clara finds herself in front of Count Guido Fossà who saves her from her embarrassment by asking her to be a lady for a dance. Cornelio supports his cousin's escape plans for her interest and provides her with a carriage that will take her wherever she wants, but the carriage in question is that of Count Fossà! Matteo does not show up for the appointment with Clara, because in San Leonardo, Giovanni Staineri died in an accident, and for some reason Matteo is accused of his murder. Count Fossà chivalrously keeps Clara company in her vain wait for Matteo, the two talk and get to know each other. Both find themselves hostage to their fathers and hostile to arranged marriages. Count Fossà takes Clara to admire the sunrise and kisses her. In San Leonardo, after the funeral of the above, Matteo and Clara abandon the intention of running away together. Clara accepts her paternal will in exchange for the promise not to sell San Leonardo. In front of the notary, Clara discovers that her betrothed - in turn unaware of her - is Count Guido Fossà. Disgusted by the situation, the count treats his bride badly and on the wedding night he goes to play cards and drink, as he used to him, and loses. At the end he's found by Gerard, an old musician friend from Paris who - learned of his marriage and his dowry - asks him for a loan .. or maybe blackmail?

=== Episode 3: Una moglie infelice (An unhappy wife) ===
The arranged marriage is an insurmountable obstacle between Clara and Guido, who spends out every night drinking, playing, chatting with lovers and under Gerard's constant blackmail. Clara returns to San Leonardo and notes that her relationship with Matteo has also radically changed; in addition she watches helplessly at the repeated embezzlement of her cousin Cornelio towards the peasants, in particular Anita. Back in Trento, a strong clash takes place between Clara, her father and Guido, whom Clara stubbornly keeps up with. That same evening Clara bursts into the Concerto café, the place frequented by Guido, she shows herself in control of the situation and makes Guido jealous who, back home, finally capitulates in front of his wife's beauty. Guido and Clara leave for a honeymoon in Rome, offered by Count Grandi; Vittorio hopes that her daughter will return home pregnant with an heir. Cornelio, furious, goes to San Leonardo and, at night, drunk, rapes Anita. After discovering what happened, Matteo beats Cornelio with a piece of wood until he bleeds, and this puts the rapist on the run.

=== Episode 4: Fiducia tradita (Trust betrayed) ===
Despite the disagreement from the servants, Aunt Adelaide gets rid of all the personal effects of Clara, believed dead for months now. In the meantime, the woman wanders around the building with the false identity of the deceased Emilia di Sant’Uber, a lady-in-waiting for her aunt Matilde. The astute cousin Cornelio and his perfidious mother, meanwhile, plot behind Guido and try to study a plan to get rid of him, so as to be able to become Aurora's guardians and therefore have all the assets that Count Vittorio has. left to her granddaughter. Adelaide thinks about murder, but Cornelio says a second death would attract too much suspicion. Aunt Matilde feels guilty for not having been next to Clara before her alleged death and confides in Emilia who, with great courage, removes the dark veil that covers her face, showing the woman her true identity and letting her know. of his plan to mask the culprits of his sad fate. Emilia (or better Clara), returns to the palace and finds in Adelaide's room the laudanum that the dangerous woman has been giving her for a long time. She then decides to take revenge on her perfidious aunt by frightening her to death in the middle of the night: by deceit she lures the noble woman into the greenhouse and makes her believe that she is facing the ghost of the deceased Clara with a pruning shears in her hand, a tool that the next day. makes to find on the pillow of the bed. Terribly frightened, Adelaide worries Cornelio and Annabelle who think she's going crazy. Clara reveals to her aunt Matilde that she wants to take revenge first on Adelaide and then on Guido and the woman warns her. Guido overhears Cecile confiding to little Aurora that he comes from Flanders. He then remembers Clara's suspicions about the nanny's provenance and therefore understands that apparently they were well founded: Cecile lied to everyone. Clara carries out her diabolical plan against her Adelaide by making her find some photos of her on her desk and scaring her to death once again. During a concert attended by Guido, Annabelle, Cornelio and Adelaide, the latter goes to the bathroom to freshen up, and it is here that Clara sets a trap for her aunt, appearing suddenly in front of her. Aunt Matilde tries to convince Clara to go to justice, but Clara is determined to carry out her plan to expose all the culprits. Terribly worn out, Adelaide confides to Cornelio that she is being haunted by the ghost of her granddaughter. While Clara carries out her secret investigation, Guido, Cornelio and Annabelle try to sell the San Leonardo estate. Meanwhile, Adelaide loses her mind due to Clara's burial and is locked up in an asylum. With Matilde's help, Clara enters the silk factory and rummages through Guido's personal effects to look for evidence of his involvement in Ludovico's death : she then accidentally comes across a newspaper article about Amelie's death and thus learns of her husband's past, convinced that the unfortunate woman was killed by Guido. The police interrogate Guido about Ludovico's death, following an anonymous complaint received and Cornelio assumes his defense. The police then give Guido a letter written by Clara before her "death", in which she accuses him, Cornelio and Adelaide of wanting to kill her. Despite Cornelio's opposition, the policemen search some rooms of the building in search of evidence and find a bottle of laudanum in one of the drawers of Guido's desk, who is then arrested for the murders of Ludovico and Clara. Annabelle is worried and fears that the truth may come out, but Cornelio reassures her that the only one to pay will be Guido : the woman begs him to get him out of trouble and spare him of the gallows, but Cornelio threatens her. Behind bars, Cornelio is confronted by Guido who has discovered that Cecilie and Annabelle are actually sisters, and are part of a plan concocted against him with the complicity of Adelaide. Cornelio, fearing he will get into trouble, threatens the man to harm Aurora. Clara and Matilde accompany Aurora to San Leonardo, where they accidentally find in a trunk the baby blanket in which the girl was wrapped on the day she was born. Clara then remembers that the nuns who saved her life after her accident also had an identical baby blanket, in which Matteo was found as soon as he was born ...this makes it clear to Clara and the audience that Matteo is her twin brother. Clara goes to see Adelaide to the asylum and makes her see the truth : the woman, now mad, confesses to having killed her mother the day she and Matteo were born, the latter abandoned with the aim of making Cornelio the sole heir of the count. The girl then goes to San Leonardo and confides the whole truth to Matteo. The boy is over the moon, but he recommends her to be very careful. Meanwhile, Guido renounces to defend himself and is sentenced to the death penalty. Before the execution, Annabelle goes to see him in prison unbeknownst to Cornelio : the man begs her to go and report his accomplice, but the baroness asks for forgiveness, explaining that she cannot do it because, otherwise, it could be blackmailed by Cornelio, who knows all her secrets. Finally, while Guido tearfully confesses to the fake Emilia what his last wishes are about the future of his little daughter, the "veiled lady" finally comes out into the open! It is a moment of great emotion for the man, incredulous and convinced that he is already dead, but Clara makes him understand that it is not a dream, but reality : they are both alive and the end of the nightmare is finally near! There is no time to waste : the woman therefore immediately sets off on the trail of Gerard, whom she manages to track down with the help of Annabelle, obviously always with the fake identity of Emilia di Sant’Uber. Thus began a race against time : the judge anticipates Guido's execution by a week and Clara risks not being able to clear him in time. Returning from Paris, where she managed to have Gerard arrested, Clara saves her husband at the last minute, a few moments before the execution. Faced with the incredulous looks of Amelie and Carlotta, Cornelio is arrested for the attempted murder of Clara. Happiness is around the corner: Clara and Guido get back together and little Aurora finally has both of her parents next to her again, growing up and learning to play the piano better and better. Happy ending? No ... this is just the beginning of a long and happy life together for Clara, Guido and little Aurora.
