= My Quick Way Out =

- Theatrical release poster
- Spanish: Volando voy
- Directed by: Miguel Albaladejo
- Screenplay by: Juan Carlos Delgado; Miguel Albaladejo
- Produced by: Jaume Roures; Gustavo Ferrada; Álvaro Augustin
- Starring: Borja Navas; Fernando Tejero; Mariola Fuentes; Álex Casanovas; Mar Regueras; José Luis García-Pérez
- Cinematography: Alfonso Sanz Alduán
- Edited by: Pablo Blanco
- Music by: Lucio Godoy
- Production companies: Mediapro; Sogecine; Estudios Picasso
- Release date: 13 January 2006
- Country: Spain
- Language: Spanish

My Quick Way Out (Spanish: Volando voy) is a 2006 Spanish film directed by Miguel Albaladejo which stars Borja Navas as Juan Carlos "El Pera".

== Plot ==
Based on the early life of Juan Carlos Delgado "el Pera" and set in the 1970s, the plot follows the mishaps of Juan Carlos, a 9-year-old car thief and driver from Getafe, who gets his life back on track thanks to the efforts of Tío Alberto at Leganés's Ciudad de los Muchachos school.

== Cast ==
- Borja Navas as Juan Carlos el Pera
- Fernando Tejero as Juan
- Mariola Fuentes as Pepita
- Àlex Casanovas as tío Alberto
- Mar Regueras as Bego
- José Luis García Pérez as el señorito

== Production ==
The film is a Mediapro, Sogecine, and Estudios Picasso production, and it had the participation of Telecinco, Telemadrid, TV3 and Canal+. Shooting locations included Madrid and Toledo.

== Release ==
Distributed by Soqepaq, the film was released theatrically in Spain on 13 January 2006. It was picked up within Karlovy Vary International Film Festival's main competition slate for its international premiere.

== Reception ==
Javier Ocaña of El País deemed the film to be "overly explanatory and somewhat discursive", considering that it ends up "buried by too many ups and downs in writing, directing and acting".

Pere Vall of Fotogramas gave the film 2 out of 5 stars, saying that the script writing was the film's worst point, whilst singling out Mariola Fuentes' performance and some family sequences as positive elements.

Jonathan Holland of Variety deemed the film to be "an unconvincing period piece based on the true story of a kid criminal in ’70s Madrid", "studded with good moments" but failing "to develop its rich source material".

== See also ==
- List of Spanish films of 2006
