= Antonio Muñoz Molina =

Spanish writer (born 1956)

The Most Excellent Antonio Muñoz Molina
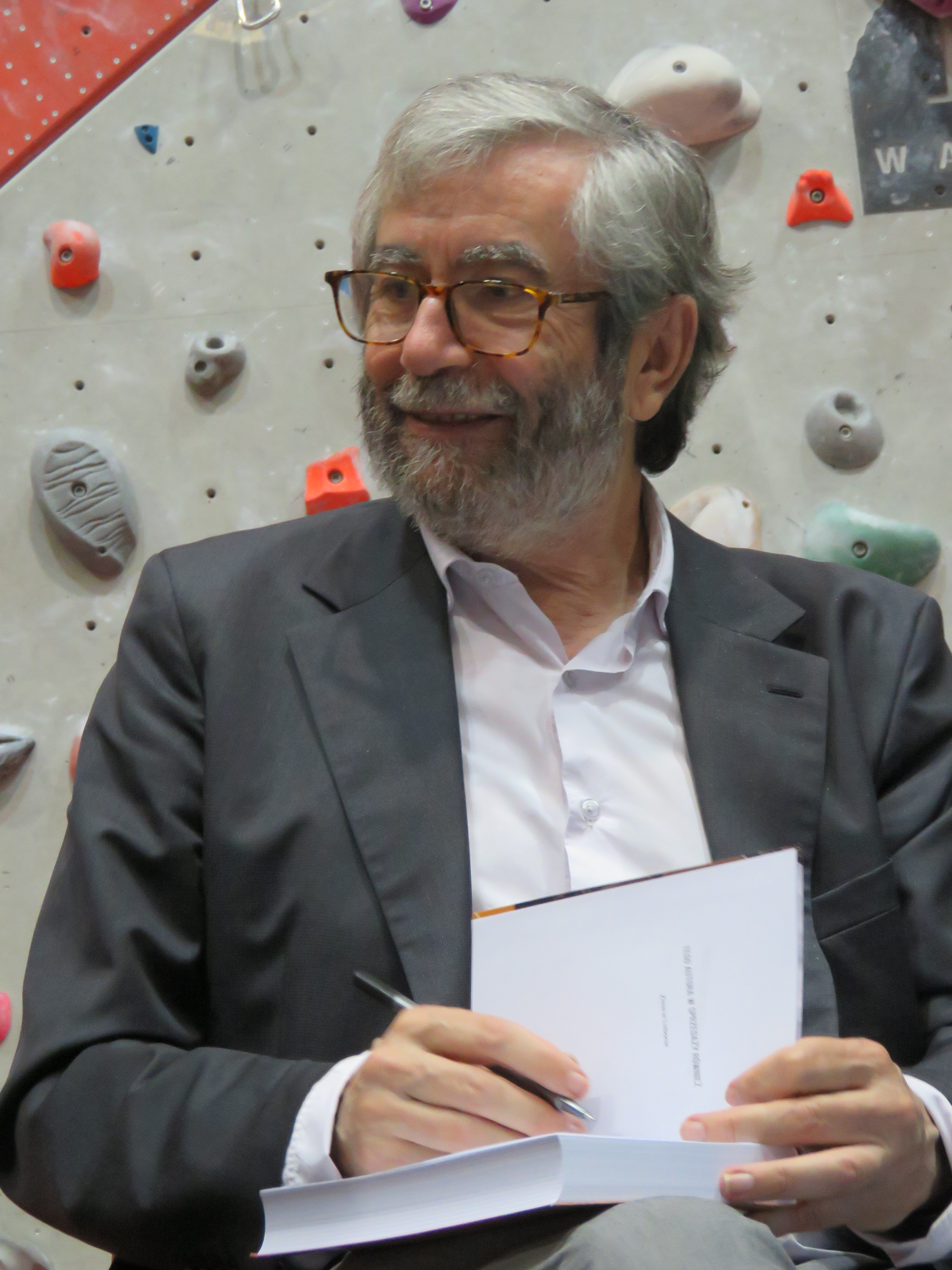
- Muñoz Molina at Warsaw on 23 June 2018
- Born: 10 January 1956 (age 70); Úbeda, Jaén, Spain
- Education: University of Granada; Complutense University of Madrid
- Occupations: Novelist; journalist
- Spouse: Elvira Lindo (m. 1994)
- Children: 3
- Writing career
- Language: Spanish
- Notable awards: National Novel Prize (1988, 1992); Premio Planeta (1991); Jerusalem Prize (2013); Prince of Asturias Award (2013); Prix Médicis étranger (2020)
- Literary movement: Spanish contemporary literature

Seat u of the Real Academia Española
- Incumbent
- Assumed office 16 June 1996 (Note: Elected on 8 June 1995)
- Preceded by: Seat established

Signature
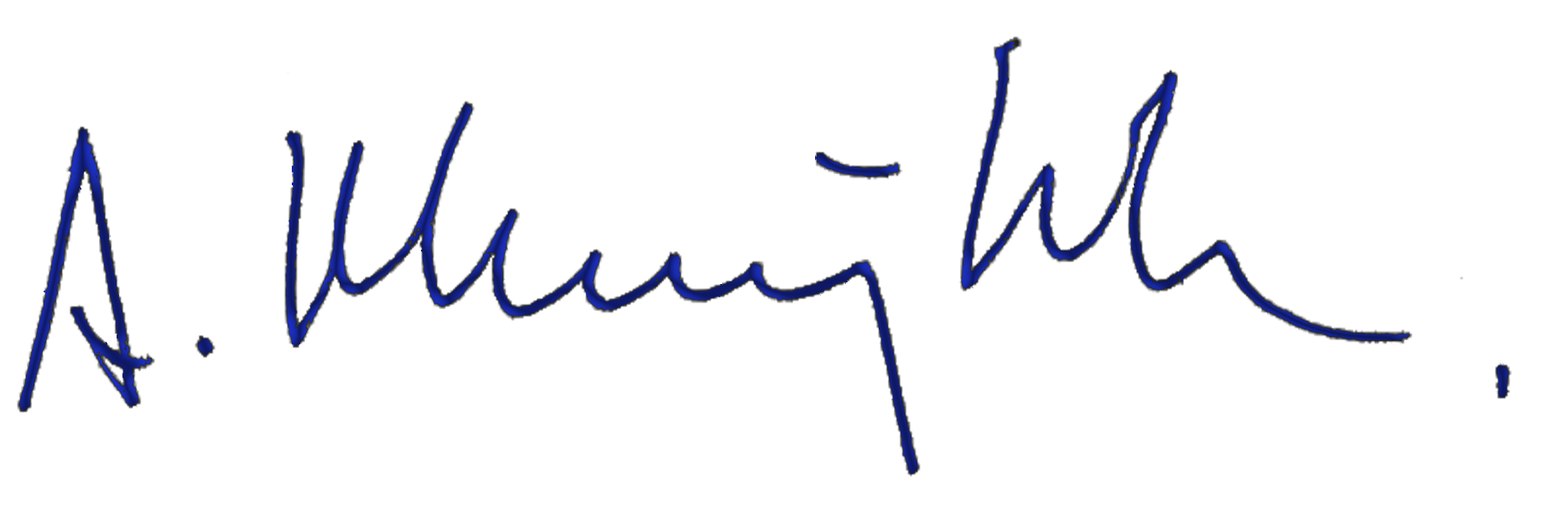

Antonio Muñoz Molina (born 10 January 1956) is a Spanish writer, a full member of the Royal Spanish Academy since 8 June 1995. He received the 1991 Premio Planeta, the 2013 Jerusalem Prize, and the 2013 Prince of Asturias Award for literature.

== Biography ==
Muñoz Molina was born in the town of Úbeda in Jaén province. He studied history of art at the University of Granada and journalism in Madrid. He began writing in the 1980s; his first published book, El Robinsón urbano, a collection of his journalistic work, was published in 1984. His columns have regularly appeared in El País and Die Welt.

His first novel, Beatus ille, appeared in 1986. It features the imaginary city of Mágina—a re-creation of his Andalusian birthplace—which would reappear in some of his later works.

In 1987 Muñoz Molina was awarded Spain's National Narrative Prize for El invierno en Lisboa (translated as Winter in Lisbon), a homage to the genres of film noir and jazz music. His El jinete polaco received the Planeta Prize in 1991 and, again, the National Narrative Prize in 1992.

His other novels include Beltenebros (1989), a story of love and political intrigue in post-Civil War Madrid, Los misterios de Madrid (1992), and El dueño del secreto (1994).

Muñoz Molina was elected to Seat u of the Real Academia Española on 8 June 1995; he took up his seat on 16 June 1996.

Muñoz Molina is married to the Spanish author and journalist Elvira Lindo. He currently resides in New York City, United States, where he served as the director of the Instituto Cervantes from 2004 to 2005.

Margaret Sayers Peden's English translation of Muñoz Molina's novel Sepharad won the PEN/Book-of-the-Month Club Translation Prize in 2004. He also won the Jerusalem Prize in 2013. Isabelle Gugnon's French translation of Muñoz Molina's novel Un andar solitario entre la gente won the 2020 Prix Médicis étranger.

== Bibliography ==
- El Robinsón urbano, 1984.
- Diario de Nautilus, 1985.
- Beatus Ille, 1986. English translation: A Manuscript of Ashes. Trans. Edith Grossman. Orlando: Harcourt, 2008. ISBN 9780547541914.
- El invierno en Lisboa, 1987. English translation: Winter in Lisbon. Trans. Sonia Soto. London: Granta, 1999. ISBN 9781862071667.
- Las otras vidas, 1988.
- Beltenebros, 1989. English translation: Prince of Shadows. Trans. Peter R. Bush. London: Quartet, 1993. ISBN 9780704370388.
- Córdoba de los omeyas, 1991.
- El jinete polaco, 1991.
- Los misterios de Madrid, 1992.
- Nada del otro mundo, 1993.
- El dueño del secreto, 1994.
- Las apariencias, 1995.
- Ardor guerrero, 1995.
- La huerta del Edén, 1996.
- Pura alegría, 1996.
- Plenilunio, 1997.
- Carlota Fainberg, 1999.
- En ausencia de Blanca, 2001. English translation: In her Absence. Trans. Esther Allen. New York: Other Press, 2006. ISBN 9781590512531.
- Sefarad, 2001. English translation: Sepharad. Trans. Margaret Sayers Peden. Orlando: Harcourt, 2003. ISBN 9780156034746.
- La vida por delante, 2002.
- Las ventanas de Manhattan, 2004
- El viento de la luna, 2006
- Días de diario, 2007
- La noche de los tiempos, 2009. English translation: In the Night of Time. Trans. Edith Grossman. Boston: Houghton Mifflin Harcourt, 2013. ISBN 9780547547848.
- Todo lo que era sólido, 2013
- Como la sombra que se va, 2014. English translation: Like a Fading Shadow. Trans. Camilo A. Ramirez. New York: Farrar, Straus and Giroux, 2017. ISBN 9781250182432.
- Un andar solitario entre la gente, 2018. English translation: To Walk Alone in the Crowd. Trans. Guillermo Bleichmar. New York: Farrar, Straus and Giroux, 2021. ISBN 9780374190255.
- Tus pasos en la escalera, 2019. English translation: Your Steps on the Stairs. Trans. Curtis Bauer. New York: Other Press, 2025. ISBN 9781635424355.
- El miedo de los niños, 2020.
- Volver a dónde, 2021.
- No te veré morir, 2023.
