= Lucio Godoy =

Spanish-Argentine film composer and music producer

Lucio Godoy (born 1958) is an Argentine-Spanish film composer and music producer.

He lived in Madrid from 1992 to 2013, working as a film ad TV composer, scoring and doing the music production for more than 50 feature films. In 2013, he became the director of the Scoring for Film, Television, and Video Games master's degree program at Berklee College of Music's campus in Valencia, Spain.

His feature film credits include: Fin (Jorge Torregrosa), Blackthorn (Mateo Gil), Un cuento chino, Amador, Los Lunes al sol (Fernando León de Aranoa), Triage (Danis Tanović), Los girasoles ciegos, La educación de las hadas (José Luis Cuerda), Mataharis (Icíar Bollaín), El penalti más largo del mundo, El club de los suicidas (Roberto Santiago), Nacidas para sufrir, Cachorro (Miguel Albaladejo), El corredor nocturno, Las razones de mis amigos, Silencio en la Nieve, (Gerardo Herrero), Intacto (Juan Carlos Fresnadillo), Don't Move (Sergio Castellitto) and El aura (Fabián Bielinsky).

He has also worked as musical producer for other composers' films, including Mar adentro, Los otros (Alejandro Amenábar), Todo sobre mi madre, Carne trémula and La flor de mi secreto (Pedro Almodóvar).

== Critical reception ==
His score for The Education of Fairies (2006) was described as "...delicately-wrought, attractive fare that perfectly complements the mood."

== Filmography ==
- Cenizas a las cenizas (1993)
- Cachorro (1996) a.k.a. Bearcub
- Pintadas (1996)
- El Ramo de flores (1996)
- Sangre ciega (1994)
- Ataque verbal (1999)
- Marta y alrededores (1999) a.k.a. Marta and Surroundings
- Manolito Gafotas (1999) a.k.a. Manolito Four Eyes
- Desire (1999)
- La Primera Noche De mi Vida 1998) a.k.a. The First Night of My Life
- Las Razones de mis amigos (2000) a.k.a. Friends Have Reasons
- Carretera y manta (2000) a.k.a. To the End of the Road
- Intacto (2001) a.k.a. Intact
- Mujeres en un Tren (2001) a.k.a. Women in a Train
- El Cielo abierto (2001) a.k.a. Ten Days Without Love
- Carlos contra el mundo (2002) a.k.a. Carlos Against the World
- Los Lunes al sol (2002) a.k.a. Mondays in the Sun
- Rencor (2002) a.k.a. Rancour
- EL Lugar donde estuvo el paraíso (2002) a.k.a. The Place That Was Paradise
- El lápiz del carpintero (2003)
- El Principio de Arquímedes (2004) a.k.a. The Archimedes Principle
- Non ti muovere (2004) a.k.a. Don't Move
- Cachorro (2004) a.k.a. Bear Cub
- Melissa P. (2005)
- El Aura (2005) a.k.a. The Aura
- Heroína (2005)
- Hermanas (2005)
- Manchas (2005)
- Películas para no dormir: Regreso a Moira (2006) (TV)
- Los aires difíciles (2006) a.k.a. Rough Winds
- Volando voy (2006)
- Blackthorn (2011)
- Un cuento chino (2011) a.k.a. Chinese Takeaway
- Gran Hotel (2011)
- Bakery in Brooklyn (2016)
- Tiempo Después (2018)
