= Mar Regueras =

Spanish actress (born 1970)

María del Mar Regueras Serrano
- Born: 11 April 1970 (age 55); Barcelona, Spain
- Children: Violeta
- Website: www.marregueras.com

María del Mar Regueras Serrano better known as Mar Regueras (born 11 April 1970) is a Spanish film, television and theatre actress. She was nominated for Goya Award for Best Supporting Actress for her acting in Rencor (2002).

== Career ==
Mar took her initial training from Theatre Institute of Barcelona where Francisco Pino was the trainer. She was also trained from Superior Dancr Institute of Barcelona (classical, contemporary, jazz).

== Filmography ==
=== films ===
- 2007: Los Totenwackers
- 2006: GAL
- 2005:
  - Ninette
  - Volando voy
- 2003:
  - Sin hogar
  - La flaqueza del bolchevique
- 2002: Rencor
- 2001: Mi casa es tu casa

=== Television ===
| Year | Title | Role | Channel | Episodes |
|---|---|---|---|---|
| 1999 | A las once en casa | | La 1 | 1 episode |
| 1999 - 2002 | El comisario | Lola Écija | Telecinco | 65 episodes |
| 2003 | Sin hogar | Rosa | Antena 3 | TV movie |
| 2004 - 2005 | De moda | Marta | FORTA | 23 episodes |
| 2005 | Lobos | Mara Lobo | Antena 3 | 9 episodes |
| 2006 | Àngels i Sants | Àngels | TV3 | 7 episodes |
| 2007 - 2009 | Herederos | Julia Orozco Argenta | La 1 | 36 episodes |
| 2008 | Buscando al hombre perfecto | Virginia | Canal Sur | TV movie |
| 2011 | Ángel o demonio | Ruth | Telecinco | 1 episode |
| 2011 | Los misterios de Laura | Vera | La 1 | 2 episodes |
| 2011 | Tita Cervera. La baronesa | Tita Cervera | Telecinco | 2 episodes |
| 2012 | Hospital Central | Manuela Rubio | Telecinco | 17 episodes |
| 2015 | La dama velada | Matilde Grandi | RAI y Telecinco | 2 episodes |
| 2015 | Sin identidad | Miriam Prats | Antena 3 | 8 episodes |
| 2017 | Servir y proteger | Natalia Contreras | La 1 | 10 episodes |
| 2018 | José Mota presenta | | La 1 | 1 episode |
| 2020 | Desaparecidos | Amelia | Telecinco | 1 episode |

=== Television programs ===
- 1997-1998: Música sí (on La 1) as Presenter
- 1996-1997: Grand Prix (on La 1) as Co-presenter
- 1993-1994: El Gran Juego de la Oca (on Antena 3)
- 2017: Cámbiame as Invited Guest

=== Theatre ===
- 2010-2012: La guerra de los Rose
- 2000: Top Dogs
- 1999: Chicago
- 1993-1994: Golfus de Roma
- 1992: Cabaret
