= Ángeles González-Sinde =

Spanish politician

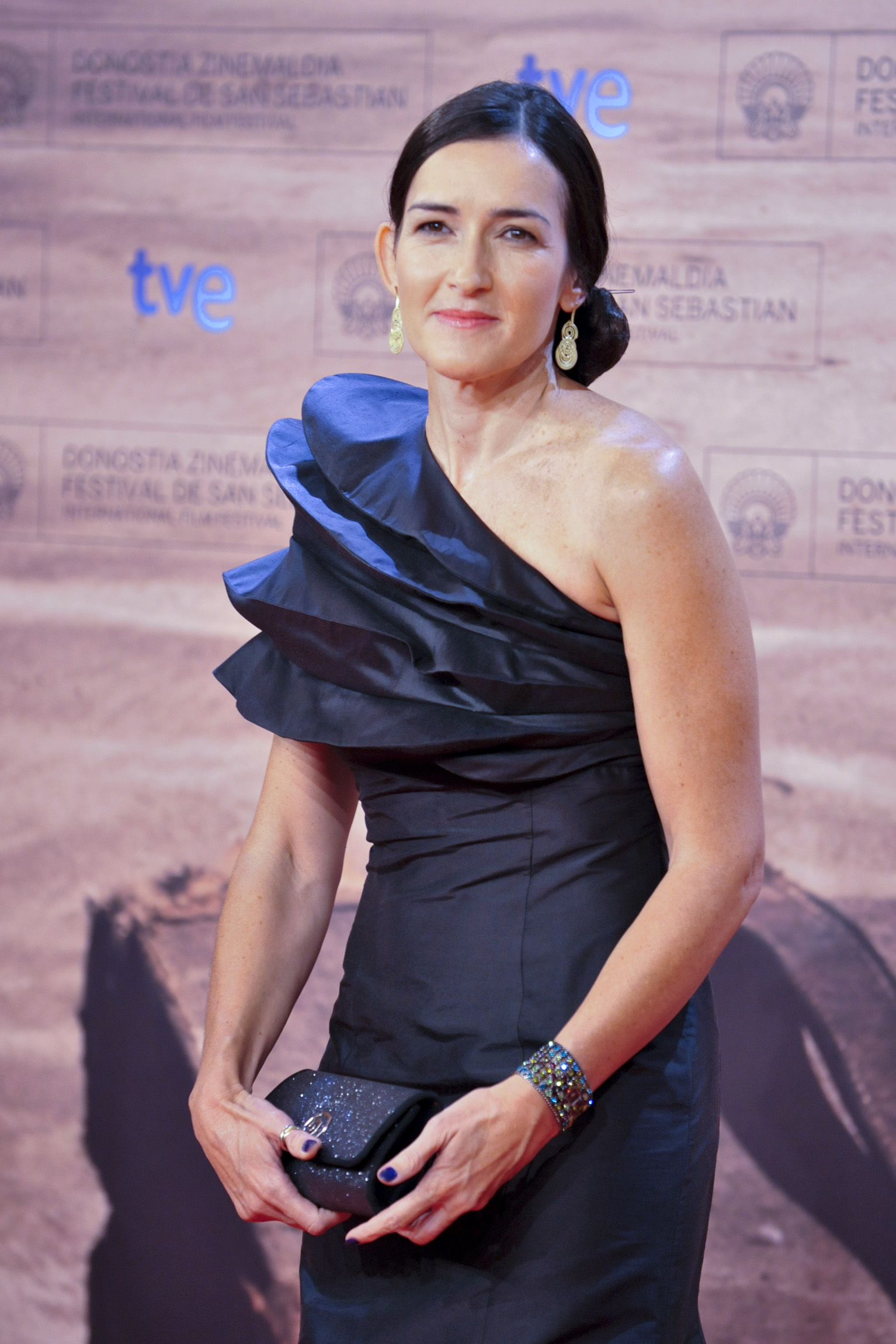
- At the 59th San Sebastián International Film Festival in 2011

Minister of Culture
- In office 7 April 2009 – 22 December 2011
- Prime Minister: José Luis Rodríguez Zapatero
- Preceded by: César Antonio Molina
- Succeeded by: José Ignacio Wert

Personal details
- Born: Ángeles González-Sinde Reig; 7 April 1965 (age 61) Madrid, Spain
- Party: Independent
- Education: Complutense University
- Occupation: Screenwriter, Film director

Ángeles González-Sinde Reig (born 7 April 1965) is a Spanish scriptwriter, film director and politician serving as chairwoman of the Reina Sofía Museum's Board of Trustees since 2020.

Previously, she served as Minister of Culture from April 2009 until December 2011. Her appointment was received with anger and rejection by the Spanish Internet Community, due to González-Sinde's opposition to P2P file sharing and the alleged conflict of interest due to her ties to the film industry. A strict anti-piracy law enacted in Spain in December 2011 has become known colloquially as Ley Sinde, or the Sinde Law, as she was seen as the primary backer of the measure.

== Biography ==
Ángeles González-Sinde Reig was born 7 April 1965. She is the daughter of the academy's founder, José María González-Sinde, Sr. Her brother, José María González-Sinde, Jr., is also involved in the film industry.

González-Sinde studied Classics at the Complutense University of Madrid and did a master's degree in Cinema Scriptwriting at the AFI Conservatory in Los Angeles.

From 1999 to 2001, she served as president of ALMA, the main screenwriters' union of Spain.

She served as president of Academia de las Artes y las Ciencias Cinematográficas de España (AACCE) (Spanish Academy of Arts and Cinematographic Sciences) from December 2006 until April 2009.

In April 2009, González-Sinde was appointed Culture Minister. This sparked a movement against her from the Spanish Internet users community, represented by the Asociacion de Internautas (Internet Users Association). They stated that she was unable to fulfill correctly the needs and obligations of her position because of a conflict of interests, as she had personal ties with businesses involved in the film industry and consequently could not be impartial. Moreover, Spanish law 5/2006 of April 10, 2006 regulates conflicts of interest among high-ranking positions in the Spanish government.

In June 2020 she was appointed president of the Royal Board of Trustees of the Museo Nacional Centro de Arte Reina Sofía.

== Filmography ==
=== Director ===
- La suerte dormida (2003)
- Madrid 11M: Todos íbamos en ese tren (2004)—«Como los demás»
- Una palabra tuya (2008)
- El comensal (2022)

=== Scriptwriter ===
- La casa de los líos —television series (1 episode, 1996).
- La buena estrella (1997), by Ricardo Franco.
- Lágrimas negras (1998), by Ricardo Franco.
- Segunda piel (1999), by Gerardo Vera.
- Las razones de mis amigos (2000), by Gerardo Herrero.
- Antigua vida mía (2001), by Héctor Olivera.
- Cuéntame cómo pasó—television series (2001).
- El misterio Galíndez (2003), by Gerardo Herrero.
- Manolito Gafotas (2004), by Antonio Mercero.
- La suerte dormida (2003).
- La vida que te espera (2004), by Manuel Gutiérrez Aragón.
- La puta y la ballena (2004), by Luis Puenzo.
- Madrid 11M: Todos íbamos en ese tren (2004), by several directors.
- Entre vivir y soñar (2004), by Alfonso Albacete and David Menkes.
- Heroína (2005), by Gerardo Herrero.
- Los aires difíciles (2006), by Gerardo Herrero.
- Todos estamos invitados (2007), by Manuel Gutiérrez Aragón.
- Una palabra tuya (2008).
- Mentiras y Gordas (2009).

== Awards ==
- Goya Award for Best Original Screenplay, La buena estrella, by Ricardo Franco (1997).
- Goya Award for Best New Director for La suerte dormida (2003).
- Prize Turia for Best New Work La suerte dormida (2003).
- XX Festival de Cine Español de Málaga, Best Script for Heroína (2005), by Gerardo Herrero.
- Premio Planeta de Novela, runner-up for El buen hijo
