= Manolito Gafotas =

Title character of a Spanish book series (1994–2012)

Manolito as illustrated by Emilio Urberuaga

Manolito Gafotas, translated into English as Manolito Four-Eyes, is a 1994 children's novel by the Spanish writer Elvira Lindo, illustrated by Emilio Urberuaga. The first of a series of novels about the adventures of a working class kid in Carabanchel, Madrid, the Kirkus review comments on its chatty, first-person narrative and understated humor and describes it as "a classic in its native Spain."

The book series inspired two movies (in 1999 and 2004) and a TV series (also in 2004). In January 2020, the author and the publisher announced that Hollywood film and TV studio Exile Content, headed by former Univision and Televisa chief content officer Isaac Lee, would create a second TV series based on the book.

== Recognition ==
Since 2006, there has been a park named after him. On 9 April of that year, with the attendance of Elvira Lindo, the Parque Lineal del PAU de Carabanchel was renamed Parque Manolito Gafotas.

Since 2022, Manolito Gafotas has also been commemorated by a route through places associated with his life, the Wikiloc route Paseo Manolito Gafotas, desde Aluche a los Carabancheles.

== Books ==
- Manolito Gafotas (1994)
- Pobre Manolito (1995)
- ¡Cómo molo!: (otra de Manolito Gafotas) (1996)
- Los trapos sucios de Manolito Gafotas (1997)
- Manolito on the road (1998)
- Yo y el Imbécil (1999)
- Manolito tiene un secreto (2002)
- Mejor Manolo (2012)
