= Javier Ybarra Bergé =

Spanish politician (1913–1977)

- Born: Javier de Ybarra y Bergé; 2 July 1913; Bilbao, Spain
- Died: 22 June 1977 (aged 63); Navarra, Spain
- Cause of death: Ballistic trauma
- Occupations: Industrialist; Writer
- Known for: Being kidnapped and murdered by ETA separatists

Javier de Ybarra y Bergé (2 July 1913 – 22 June 1977) was a Basque industrialist, writer and politician from Bilbao, Spain.

== Life and death ==
Born into a prominent Bilbao family, Javier Ybarra attended the University of Deusto. During the Spanish Second Republic he was affiliated with the Partido Nacionalista Español and then the monarchist Renovación Española party. He fought and was injured in the Civil War. From 1963 to 1969 he was mayor of Bilbao and wrote works related to his experience during the Civil War, history and politics. He was an executive with firms including Babcock & Wilcox, several banks and the newspaper El Correo.

On 20 May 1977, Ybarra was kidnapped by renegade members of the Basque separatist group ETA, who entered his home in disguise, bound and gagged members of his family and took him away in an ambulance. Demanding the release of a number of Basque prisoners (a condition largely met by the Spanish government), his captors later demanded a ransom of one billion pesetas and further prisoner releases. The situation had been complicated by the fact that the group that had kidnapped Ybarra formally renounced their affiliation with the larger ETA organization while holding him and were further disturbed when their leader was arrested in France. The Ybarra family attempted to negotiate with the kidnappers and push back the payment deadline. The kidnappers did not respond until 20 June, when they announced they had killed Ybarra and sent a map to lead to his body. When the Guardia Civil failed to find it, another communication was sent and it was found near a farmhouse in Navarra. He had been shot in the head and wrapped in a plastic sheet.

Occurring in the immediate aftermath of Spain's first free national elections in forty years, the Ybarra killing provoked widespread condemnation. Following the discovery of the body, the Madrid daily newspaper ABC lead with a full page photo of Ybarra and a statement that "all parties" condemned the "atrocious murder".

== See also ==
- List of kidnappings
- Lists of solved missing person cases
- List of unsolved murders (1900–1979)

== Selected works ==
- De California a Alaska. Historia de Descubrimiento. (1945)
- Mi diario de la Guerra de España 1936-1939. (1941)
- Politica Nacional en Vizcaya. De la Restauracion a la Republica. (1947)
