= Miguel Albaladejo =

Spanish screenwriter and film director

Miguel Albaladejo (Pilar de la Horadada, Alicante, 20 August 1966) is a Spanish screenwriter and film director.

== Filmography as film director ==
- The First Night of My Life (1998), made for 2000, Seen By...
- Manolito Gafotas (1999)
- Ataque verbal (1999)
- Rencor (2001)
- El cielo abierto (2001)
- Cachorro (2004)
- Volando voy (2006)
