= Some Time Later =

- Poster
- Spanish: Tiempo después
- Directed by: José Luis Cuerda
- Written by: José Luis Cuerda
- Starring: Roberto Álamo; Blanca Suárez; Iñaki Ardanaz; Carlos Areces; María Ballesteros; Javier Bódalo; Andreu Buenafuente; María Caballero; Nerea Camacho; Martín Caparrós; Raúl Cimas; Antonio de la Torre; Secun de la Rosa; Estefanía de los Santos; Gabino Diego; Saturnino García; Fernando González; Eva Hache; Miguel Herrán; Chaki Medina; Pepe Ocio; Joan Pera; Luis Perezagua; Daniel Pérez-Prada; Miguel Rellán; Joaquín Reyes; Berto Romero; César Sarachu; Manolo Solo; Arturo Valls
- Cinematography: Pau Esteve Birba
- Music by: Lucio Godoy
- Production companies: Tiempo Después AIE; Planar Gestão de Equipamentos Cinematográficos; Atresmedia Cine; El Terrat; Estela Films; Lanube Películas; Pólvora Films
- Distributed by: eOne Films Spain (es)
- Release dates: 25 September 2018 (SSIFF); 28 December 2018 (Spain)
- Countries: Spain; Portugal
- Language: Spanish

Some Time Later (Spanish: Tiempo después) is a 2018 absurdist comedy film written and directed by José Luis Cuerda which features an ensemble cast of actors and comedians. Set in the year 9177 and based on the 2015 eponymous novel by Cuerda, the film is billed as a "spiritual sequel" to the 1989 cult film Amanece, que no es poco. It is Cuerda's swan song before his death in 2020.

== Plot ==
It is about the year 9177 (one thousand years up or down) and only one building (and its suburbs) lasts from humankind. Society is divided between the elite inhabiting the building, and the 'unemployed' who live outside in shacks. The aforementioned social fabric begins to unravel after José María, an outer dweller, tries to sell a lemonade to the elite, prompting a social revolution.

== Cast ==
- Roberto Álamo as José María
- Blanca Suárez as Méndez
- Iñaki Ardanaz as Florian
- Carlos Areces as Eufemiano
- María Ballesteros as Sor Sacramento ('Sister Sacramento')
- Javier Bódalo as Ángel Luís
- Andreu Buenafuente as Zumalacárregui
- María Caballero as Isabel
- Nerea Camacho as Margarita
- Martín Caparrós as Zalduendo
- Raúl Cimas as Pozueco
- Antonio de la Torre as Padre Miñarro ('Father Miñarro')
- Secun de la Rosa as Pastrana
- Estefanía de los Santos as Mujer del Alcade ('Mayor's wife')
- Gabino Diego as Rey ('King')
- Saturnino García as Pastor ('Shepherd')
- Fernando González as Pacheco
- Eva Hache as Sara Gutemberg
- Miguel Herrán as Ray
- Chaki Medina as Perico
- Pepe Ocio as Fray Vicente ('Friar Vicente')
- Joan Pera as Don Faustino
- Luis Perezagua as Victoriano
- Daniel Pérez-Prada as Morris
- Miguel Rellán as Don Alfonso
- Joaquín Reyes as Arriondas
- Berto Romero as Agustín
- César Sarachu as Galbarriato
- Manolo Solo as Alcalde ('Mayor')
- Arturo Valls as Justo

== Production ==
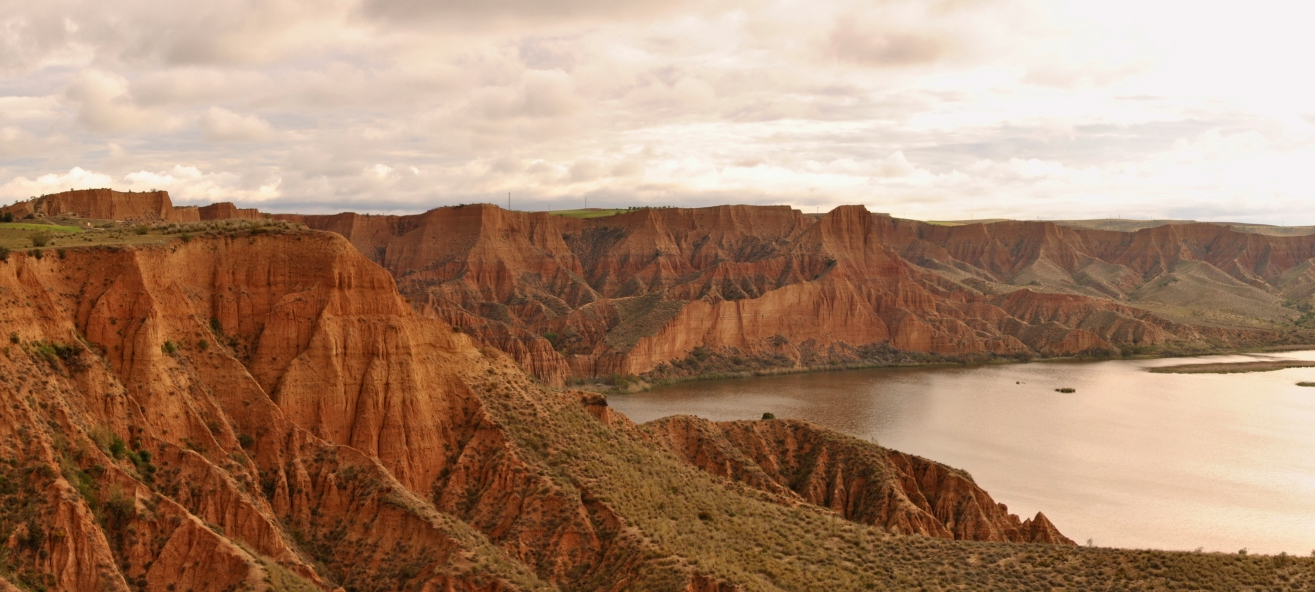
Footage was shot in the Barrancas del Burujón

The screenplay adapted the novel Tiempo después by José Luis Cuerda written in 2015, in turn based on a discarded screenplay from 1997. A group of comedians (including Edu Galán, Andreu Buenafuente, Berto Romero and Arturo Valls) created a group to unshelf the work and produce a film. Some of the crew duties were entrusted to Pau Esteve Birba (cinematography), Lucio Godoy (music), Emma Tusell (editing), Pepe Domínguez (art direction), Clara Bilbao (costume design) and Miguel Calvo (sound). Andreu Buenafuente and Arturo Valls took over production duties.

The film's main theme, "Tiempo después", is performed by Joaquín Sabina.

A joint Spanish-Portuguese co-production, the film was produced by Tiempo después AIE, Estela Films, Pólvora Films, Lanube Películas, El Terrat and Planar Gestão de Equipamentos Cinematográficos, with the participation of Atresmedia Cine, Entertaintment One, Movistar+, Junta de Comunidades de Castilla-La Mancha and Castilla-La Mancha Media.

Shooting took place in between the Castilla–La Mancha and the Community of Madrid regions and wrapped by December 2017. Shooting locations included Barrancas del Burujón and Hontanar, in the province of Toledo.

The "dystopic" building in which the fiction is set is a mashup of two iconic 20th-century buildings located in Madrid: the Torres Blancas designed by Javier Sáenz de Oiza and the Spanish Cultural Heritage Institute (aka the 'Crown of Thorns') by Fernando Higueras and Antonio Miró. Some of the indoor shots were filmed in Torres Blancas.

== Release ==
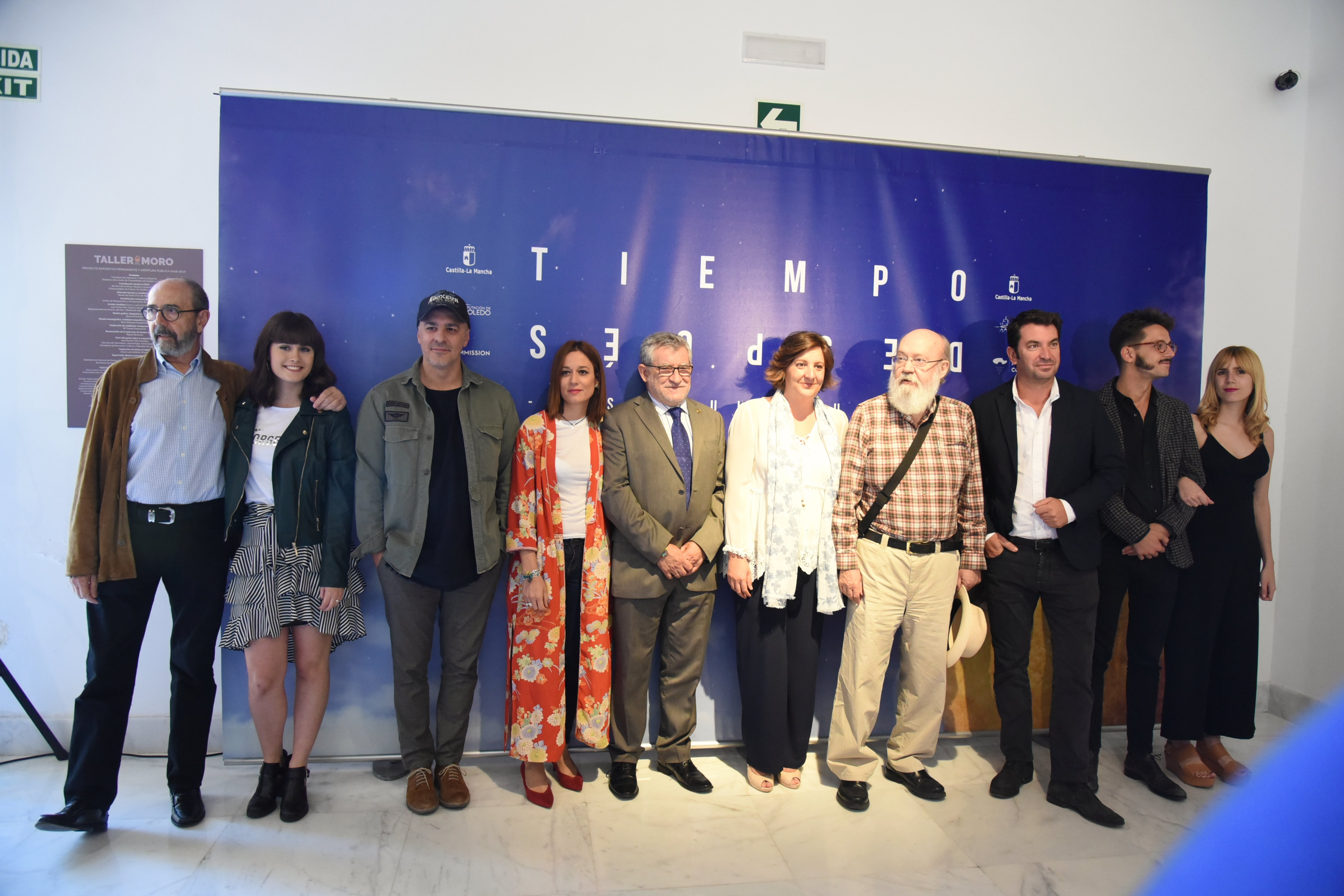
Presentation of the project in Toledo in 2017, featuring Miguel Rellán, Nerea Camacho, Roberto Álamo, José Luis Cuerda, and Arturo Valls, among others.

Some Time Later premiered at the San Sebastián International Film Festival (SSIFF) in September 2018. Distributed by eOne Films Spain, the film was theatrically released in Spain on 28 December 2018.

== Reception ==
On the review aggregator website Rotten Tomatoes, 100% of 5 critics' reviews are positive.

== Accolades ==
Year	Award	Category	Nominee(s)	Result	Ref.
2019	6th Feroz Awards	Best Comedy Film		Nominated	

== See also ==
- List of Spanish films of 2018
- List of Portuguese films of 2018
