= Daniel E. Moncho =

Spanish film producers

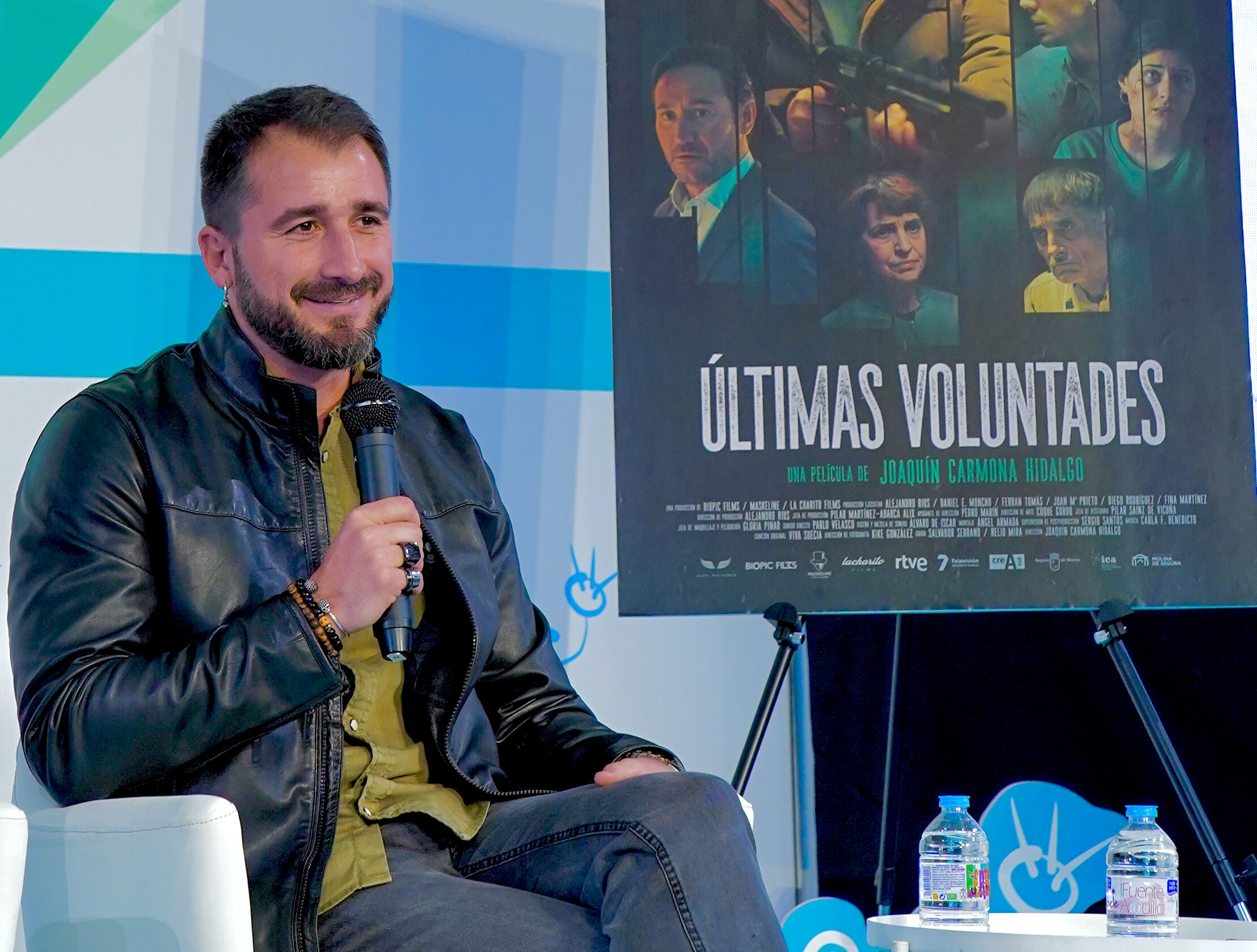
- Born: Gandía, Valencia
- Citizenship: Spanish
- Known for: Film producer, music event producer, artist manager and concert promoter.

Daniel E. Moncho (Gandía, Valencia) is a Spanish film producer, music event producer, artist manager and concert promoter.

== Early years and professional career ==
Moncho was born in Gandía (Valencia). At the early age of two he moved with his family to Cartagena (Murcia), where he attended and completed his education up to high school. During his time at university he studied in Almería, Lisbon, Seville and Murcia, where he settled after different periods in 2010. He has a degree in Physical Education, Physical Activity and Sports Science. He also holds a Master's Degree in Therapeutic Physical Activity.

Moncho began his career in 2010 in film and music after working as a props assistant in the art department of the feature film La Chispa de la Vida directed by Álex de la Iglesia and creating, a few years later - after representing groups such as Pike Cavalero, Atrezzo or One Body Two Heads - the production office of musical events, cultural management and artistic representation Gran Azul Producciones.

He is known for his work as producer and executive producer at the Murcian film production company 'Biopic Films'. His notable feature film, 'Últimas voluntades', directed by Joaquín Carmona Hidalgo, explores profound themes, while his short films, including Mar, Soledadand Los perdedores, address critical issues such as psychological abuse, suicide and sports betting addiction. His work has contributed to institutional campaigns focusing on gender-based violence, such as Si la oyes, llama! and Yo me planto!". These campaigns were created for the Dirección General de la Mujer de la Consejería de Igualdad de la Región de Murcia and the Ayuntamiento de Elche.

He is currently producing his second feature film, an adaptation of the novel El dolor de los demás by Miguel Ángel Hernández. He is also working on his first television series. Moncho is the manager of several artists such as the singer Ruth Lorenzo, the pianist Lucas Albaladejo and the rock group Carlos Vudú and the Clan Jukebox. He also represents actors Gloria De Alba and Salvador Serrano.

He is also a professor of the Master in Marketing and Communication for the Entertainment Industry at Bext, a postgraduate programme certified by the Universidad Católica San Antonio de Murcia (UCAM).

== Filmography ==
Year	Title	Role
2010	La chispa de la vida (film)	Props Assistant
2019	Mar (short film)	Producer and executive producer
2023	Últimas voluntades (film)	Producer and executive producer
2024	Los perdedores (short film)	Producer and executive producer
2024	Soledad (short film)	Producer and executive producer

== Awards ==
- Hollywood Music in Media Awards category in Original Soundtrack
