= Cristina Alcázar =

Spanish actress and director (born 1978)

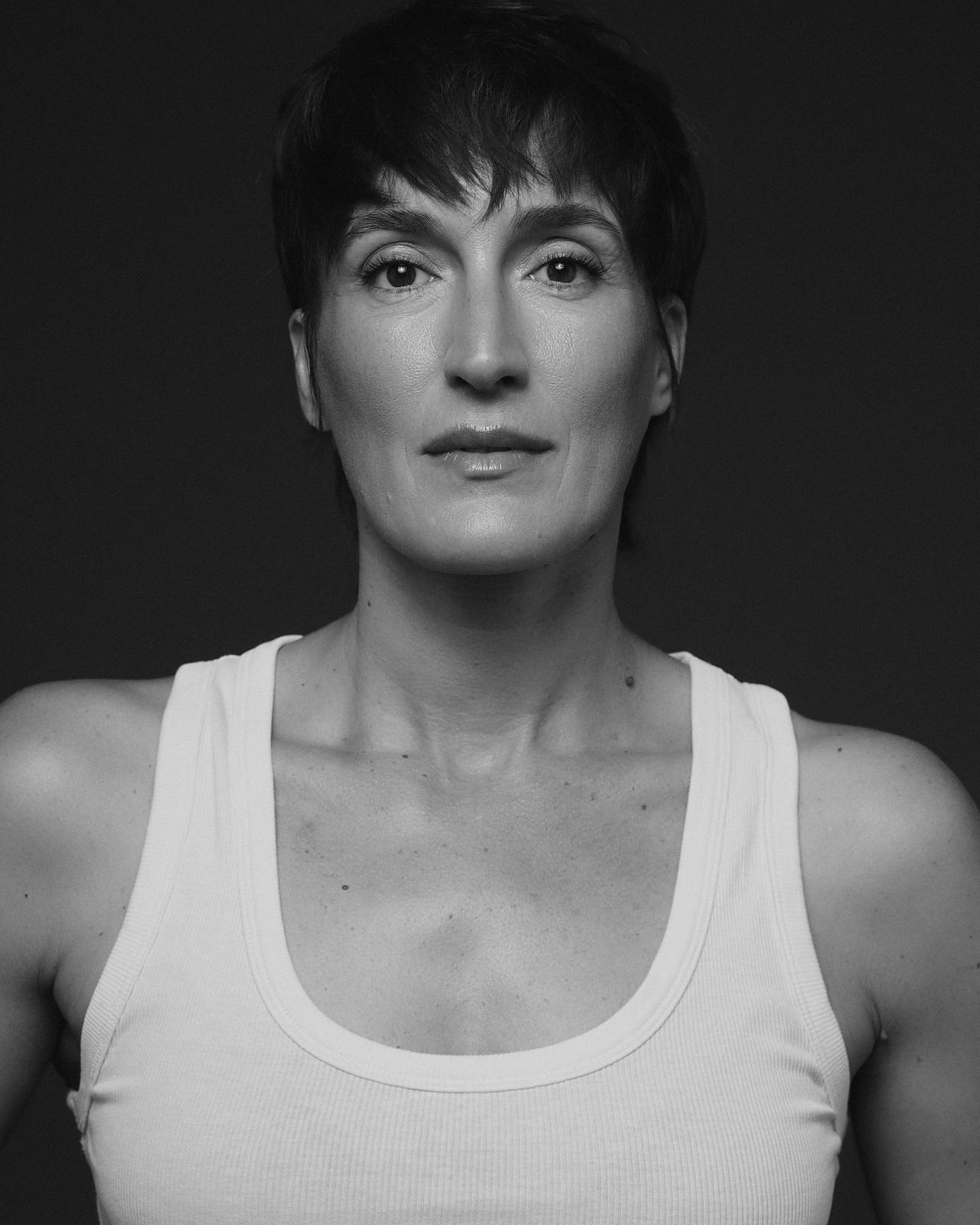
- Born: Ana Cristina García Alcázar; September 17, 1978 (age 47); Elche, Alicante, Spain
- Occupations: Actress; director
- Years active: 2004–present

Ana Cristina García Alcázar (born 17 September 1978), known professionally as Cristina Alcázar, is a Spanish actress and director, best known for her recurring role as Juana Andrade in the TVE period drama Cuéntame cómo pasó, which she played from 2006 until the end of the series in 2023, and as the philosophy teacher Marina Conde in the Antena 3 teen drama Física o química. She has appeared in a wide range of Spanish television productions throughout her career, becoming a familiar presence in the country's fiction landscape. In addition to acting, Alcázar has worked as a director and acting teacher.

== Early life and education ==
Alcázar was born on 17 September 1978 in Elche, in the province of Alicante, and is the eldest of three sisters. She has said that she knew she wanted to become an actress before she was ten years old, and first took part in theatre at her school. Before pursuing acting she practised rhythmic gymnastics for several years, training up to eight or ten hours a day in the run-up to competitions. After finishing secondary school in 1996, she studied at the Escuela Superior de Arte Dramático de Murcia, later took a course in Barcelona and at the age of 21 moved to Madrid to begin her professional career.

== Career ==
=== Theatre and film ===
After moving to Madrid, Alcázar appeared in the stage adaptation of El otro lado de la cama, directed by Josep María Mestres, which she has cited as one of her early breakthrough productions. She has maintained an extensive stage career, appearing in productions such as El manual de la buena esposa and Perversiones sexuales en Chicago between 2012 and 2013, and La vida resuelta between 2014 and 2015.

In film, she has worked with director Roberto Santiago in three productions: El penalti más largo del mundo (2005), El club de los suicidas (2007) and Al final del camino (2009), and again in El sueño de Iván (2011). She also took part in Álex de la Iglesia's La chispa de la vida (2011) and the science-fiction horror comedy La pasajera (2021), in which she played Lidia.

=== Television ===
==== Cuéntame cómo pasó ====
Alcázar took on supporting roles in popular Spanish television series including Aquí no hay quien viva, El comisario, Hospital Central, Cuestión de sexo and Los Serrano before joining the cast of Cuéntame cómo pasó in 2006 as Juana Andrade, a young photographer at the fictional newspaper Pueblo who becomes the partner and later first wife of Toni Alcántara, played by Pablo Rivero. After leaving the series in 2013 she returned in its eighteenth season in 2017, and again in the nineteenth season as part of a triangle storyline involving her character, Toni and his wife Deborah. She remained associated with the show until its conclusion in 2023, accumulating nearly 70 episodes over multiple seasons.

==== Física o química ====
In 2010 she joined the fifth season of Física o química as Marina Conde, a philosophy teacher at the fictional Colegio Zurbarán whose storyline addressed living with HIV. In the storyline, the character reveals to her students that she is living with the virus, and subsequently faces prejudice stemming from misinformation. The Spanish Ministry of Health and Social Policy recognised the series in 2010 for its contribution to combating discrimination against people with HIV, with the director of the National Plan on AIDS describing the show's treatment of the subject as appropriate and respectful. Alcázar said the role offered the change she was looking for after her time on Cuéntame, moving from a series set in late-1970s Spain to a contemporary, youth-oriented production.

==== Other television work ====
In 2011 Alcázar joined the Antena 3 sitcom Los Quién directed by Nacho G. Velilla, in which she played Candela Collado. Between 2014 and 2016 she played Patricia in the Cuatro sitcom Gym Tony for more than a hundred episodes.

In 2018 she was announced as one of the additions to the seventh season of the Antena 3 daytime drama Amar es para siempre, set in 1975, where she played Silvia Aparicio, an intelligent woman with a hidden past whose storyline was tied to that of Justo Quintero, played by Iñaki Miramón. She combined that role with her continued participation in Cuéntame cómo pasó, returning to the latter for its twentieth season.

In 2025 she appeared in Custodia repartida, the first television series directed by Goya-winning filmmaker Javier Fesser for Disney+, an eight-episode dramatic comedy about a separated couple who are forced to move back into their parents' homes to share custody of their daughter. Alcázar has also been a recurring guest on the Antena 3 game show Pasapalabra.

=== Directing ===
Alcázar made her debut as a director in 2011 with the musical short film Aunque todo vaya mal, written by Pablo Fernández and Roberto Santiago, with music by Julio de la Rosa. Shot in Elche between January and February 2011, it tells the story of a couple, Juan and Emilia, after Juan begins to express himself only by singing, and ends with a flash mob-style choreography. The short was selected at numerous national and international festivals, winning more than 14 awards, including the Pasarela Audiovisual Group Award at the Cinema Jove International Film Festival and the Best Foreign Comedy Short Film prize at The Indie Gathering International Film Festival in the United States. In 2017 she received the AISGE Award for Best Female Performance for her role in the short film Cachorro.

=== Other activities ===
In addition to her acting career, Alcázar teaches acting classes and has been involved in theatrical production. In July 2024, she presented the closing gala of the Festival de Cine Independiente de Elche.

== Personal life ==
Alcázar is known for keeping her private life away from the media spotlight.

== Selected filmography ==
=== Film ===
Year	Title	Director
2004	Catarsis	Ángel Fernández Santos
2005	El penalti más largo del mundo	Roberto Santiago
2007	Salir pitando	Álvaro Fernández Armero
2007	El club de los suicidas	Roberto Santiago
2009	7 minutos	Daniela Fejerman
2009	Al final del camino	Roberto Santiago
2011	La chispa de la vida	Álex de la Iglesia
2011	El sueño de Iván	Roberto Santiago
2021	La pasajera	Raúl Cerezo, Fernando González Gómez

=== Television ===
Year(s)	Title	Role	Network
2004	Aquí no hay quien viva	Almudena	Antena 3
2004, 2007	Hospital Central	Inés	Telecinco
2006–2023	Cuéntame cómo pasó	Juana Andrade	TVE
2007	El comisario	Manuela	Telecinco
2007	Cuestión de sexo	Verónica	Cuatro
2007	Los Serrano	Sara	Telecinco
2010–2011	Física o química	Marina Conde	Antena 3
2011	Los Quién	Candela Collado	Antena 3
2014–2016	Gym Tony	Patricia	Cuatro
2018–2019, 2023	Amar es para siempre	Silvia Aparicio	Antena 3
2025	Custodia repartida		Disney+

=== As director ===
Year	Title	Type
2011	Aunque todo vaya mal	Short film
2013	Piensa, Observa y Respira	Documentary feature
