= IPCE =

IPCE may stand for:

- Ipče Ahmedovski (1966–1994), Serbian and Macedonian folk singer
- Incident photon to converted electron, a synonym for the quantum efficiency of a solar cell
- Ipce, formerly International Pedophile and Child Emancipation, a pedophile advocacy organization
- Spanish Cultural Heritage Institute or Sede del Instituto del Patrimonio Cultural de España
