= Balanegra =

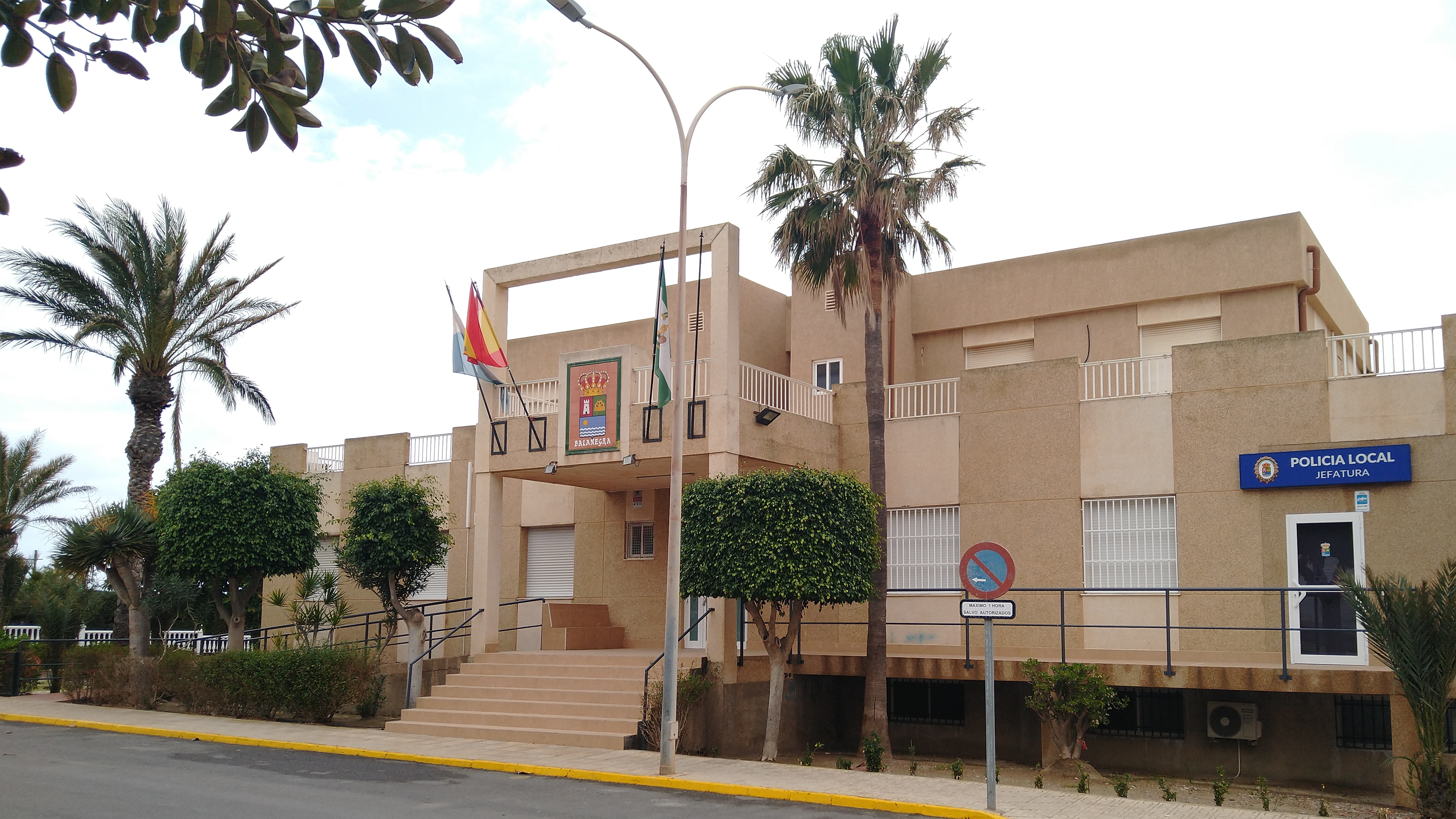
- View of Balanegra's town hall

- Flag Coat of arms

- Municipal area within the province

- Location within Spain
- Coordinates: 36°44′56″N 2°54′29″W
- Country: Spain
- Community: Andalusia
- Province: Almería

Area
  - Total: 31.58 km^{2} (12.19 sq mi)
- Elevation: 22 m (72 ft)

Population (2025-01-01)
  - Total: 3,055
  - Density: 96.74/km^{2} (250.6/sq mi)
- Demonym: Balanegrense
- Time zone: UTC+1 (CET)
  - Summer (DST): UTC+2 (CEST)
- Website: www.balanegra.es

Balanegra is a Spanish locality and a municipality in the province of Almería in the Autonomous Community of Andalusia. In 2023 it had a total population of 3,018.

Balanegra was a "local autonomous entity" within the municipality of Berja until June 2015, when it was made a municipality in its own right.

== Notable people ==
- Nerea Camacho, Spanish actress (born 1996)

== See also ==
- List of municipalities in Almería
