= The Longest Penalty Shot in the World =

- Theatrical release poster
- Spanish: El penalti más largo del mundo
- Directed by: Roberto Santiago
- Based on: "El penal más largo del mundo" by Osvaldo Soriano
- Produced by: Gerardo Herrero; Tedy Villalba; Mariela Besuievsky
- Starring: Fernando Tejero; María Botto; Marta Larralde; Carlos Kaniowsky; Javier Gutiérrez; Enrique Villén; Fernando Cayo; Luis Callejo; Cristina Alcázar; Benito Sagredo
- Cinematography: Juan A. Castaño
- Edited by: Fernando Pardo
- Music by: Lucio Godoy
- Production companies: Tornasol Films; Ensueño Films
- Distributed by: Alta Classics
- Release date: 9 March 2005
- Country: Spain
- Language: Spanish

The Longest Penalty Shot in the World (Spanish: El penalti más largo del mundo), is a 2005 Spanish comedy film directed by Roberto Santiago which stars Fernando Tejero.

== Plot ==
Fernando is a failed football goalkeeper who is finding it hard to find his bread and butter. During the final local league soccer game of the season, goalkeeper Román is injured and useless Fernando steps in to face a last-minute penalty kick. But before it's converted, the unruly crowd spills onto the field preventing the game from continuing, and the referee decrees the penalty must be retaken one week later. With money in the balance and a chance for the team to advance to a more prestigious league, the hitherto unpopular Fernando suddenly finds himself getting kid glove treatment, with team coach Santos even arranging a date with Roman's reluctant girlfriend Cecilia, whom Fernando fancies.

== Cast ==
- Fernando Tejero as Fernando
- María Botto as Ana
- Marta Larralde as Cecilia
- Carlos Kaniowsky as Santos
- Javier Gutiérrez as Rafa
- Enrique Villén as Adrián
- Fernando Cayo as Bilbao
- Luis Callejo as Khaled
- Cristina Alcázar as Julia
- Benito Sagredo as Román
- Héctor Colomé as Rodríguez

== Production and making ==
The film was produced by Tornasol Films and Ensueño Films, and it had the participation of Canal+ and FORTA. The screenplay is based on the short story "El penal más largo del mundo" by Osvaldo Soriano. The film was produced by Mariela Besuievsky, Gerardo Herrero and Tedy Villalba and it was scored by Lucio Godoy.

== Reception ==
The film was released theatrically in Spain on 9 March 2005. It was well received by the audiences, but the critics gave an average rating to the movie.

== See also ==
- List of Spanish films of 2005
