= Fernando Tejero =

Spanish actor (born 1967)

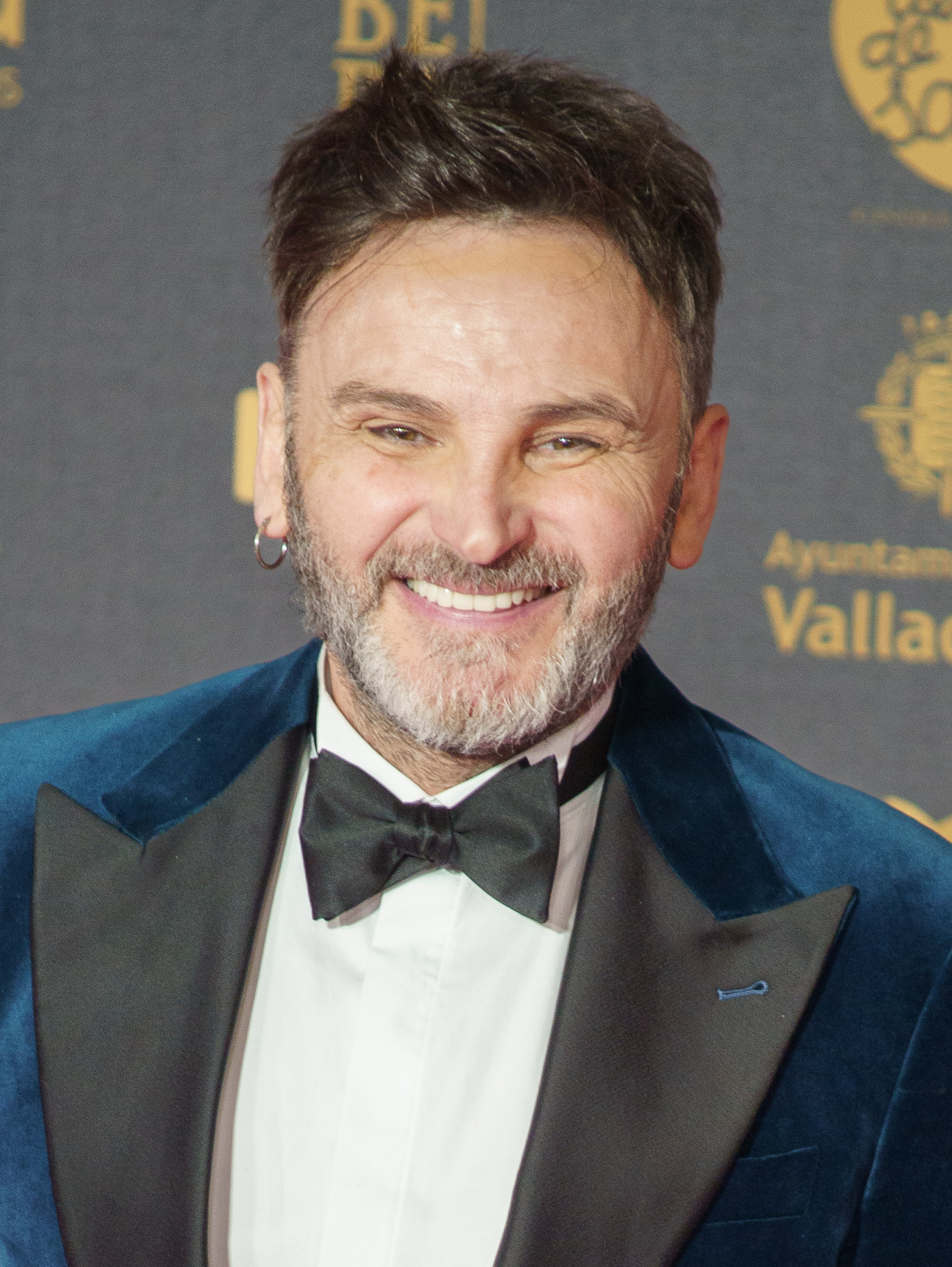
- Tejero in 2024
- Born: Fernando Tejero Muñoz-Torrero; 24 February 1965 (age 61); Córdoba, Spain
- Occupation: Actor
- Years active: 1999–present

Fernando Tejero Muñoz-Torrero (born 24 February 1965) is a Spanish actor. Among his work, he has acted in multiple films, including Football Days (2003), for which he won the Goya Award for Best New Actor, The Longest Penalty Shot in the World (2005), Chef's Special (2008), Five Square Meters (2011), and Prison 77 (2022). His portrayal of porter Emilio Delgado in comedy television series Aquí no hay quien viva earned him a great deal of popularity in Spain.

== Early life and career ==
Fernando Tejero Muñoz-Torrero was born in Córdoba on 24 February 1965. Since he was very young, Tejero knew he wanted to be an actor. However his father wanted Tejero to become a bullfighter.

Tejero worked with his parents in a seafood market. According to Tejero, during this period in his life, he had his first bad experience with showbusiness. He said he met a very famous Spanish actress with whom he had a cordial conversation. She ignored him and looked at him with contempt when she discovered he worked at a seafood market.

Tejero moved to Madrid to study dramatic art and joined the Cristina Rota acting school, where he met Alberto San Juan, who offered him a role in a play of the theatre group Animalario.

Tejero landed his feature film debut with a minor role in I Will Survive (1999). He went on to perform in bit parts in Spanish movies, slowly gaining recognition. In 2002, he appeared as a disabled man in Mondays in the Sun. In 2003, he was offered a role in Football Days, for which he won the Goya Award for best new actor. In that same year, during the casting of the now-famous Spanish ensemble comedy Aquí no hay quien viva, he was originally offered the part of Paco, the video store clerk. However, a new role was subsequently created for him, that of Emilio, the concierge; this allowed him a much more visible role than originally planned. With the show's great success, Tejero became a household name in Spain.

Since then, he has had leading roles in films, such as The Longest Penalty Shot in the World. He also covered the song "So payaso" by Extremoduro with Melendi. In 2011 he participated in the video clip Gypsy Funky Love Me Do by Rosario Flores.

In 2012, he played Fermín Trujillo in La que se avecina, being Lola's father (Macarena Gómez) and Estela Reynolds' husband (Antonia San Juan). In February 2025 it was announced he left the series.

In 2025, he portrayed the dominican friar Juan Blanco de Paz in the historical adventure in The Captive, describing his homophobic and homosexual character as "more of a survivor than a villain".

== Personal life ==
Tejero is openly gay, and during a time he dated Miguel Ortíz Vera, Mister Gay Spain 2012. They broke up in 2013, at the time when he announced he was gay. They reconciled days after. In 2016, he dated the musician Pascual Cantero, and they broke up one year later.

== Partial filmography ==
=== Film ===
Year	Title	Role	Notes	Ref.
1999	Sobreviviré (I Will Survive)		Feature film debut	
2001	La mujer de mi vida			
2001	Noche de reyes			
2002	Los lunes al sol (Mondays in the Sun)	Lázaro		
2003	Torremolinos 73	Juan Luis		
2003	Días de fútbol (Football Days)	Serafín		
2004	Cachorro (Bear Cub)	Macarrilla		
2004	Crimen Ferpecto (The Ferpect Crime)	Alonso		
2004	Shark Tale	Oscar	Voice in European Spanish dub	
2005	El penalti más largo del mundo (The Longest Penalty Shot in the World)	Fernando Díaz		
2006	Volando voy (My Quick Way Out)	Juan		
2006	Va a ser que nadie es perfecto (Nobody Is Perfect)	Carlos		
2007	Días de cine (Cinema Days)	Fino		
2007	El club de los suicidas	Antonio		
2008	Fuera de carta (Chef's Special)	Ramiro		
2008	8 citas (8 Dates)	Antonio		
2008	Gente de mala calidad	Andrés		
2009	Al final del camino (Road to Santiago)	Nacho		
2010	Desechos	Soto		
2011	En fuera de juego (Offside)	Javi		
2011	Cinco metros cuadrados (Five Square Meters)	Álex		
2011	Ivan's Dream (El sueño de Iván)	Toribio		
2012	La chispa de la vida (As Luck Would Have It)	Johnny		
2020	Explota, explota (My Heart Goes Boom!)	Chimo		
2021	La casa del caracol (The House of Snails)	Editor		
2021	El club del paro (The Unemployment Club)	Jesús		
2022	La piel en llamas (Skin in Flames)	Doctor Arellano		
2022	Modelo 77 (Prison 77)	Marbella		
2022	La fortaleza (The Fortress)	Notario ('notary')		
2023	Últimas voluntades (Last Wishes)	Coque		
2025	El cautivo (The Captive)	Blanco de Paz		

=== Television ===
- Compañeros (2002)
- Aquí no hay quien viva (2003–2006)
- El síndrome de Ulises( 2008)

Gominolas (2007)

- La que se avecina (2012–present)

== Accolades ==
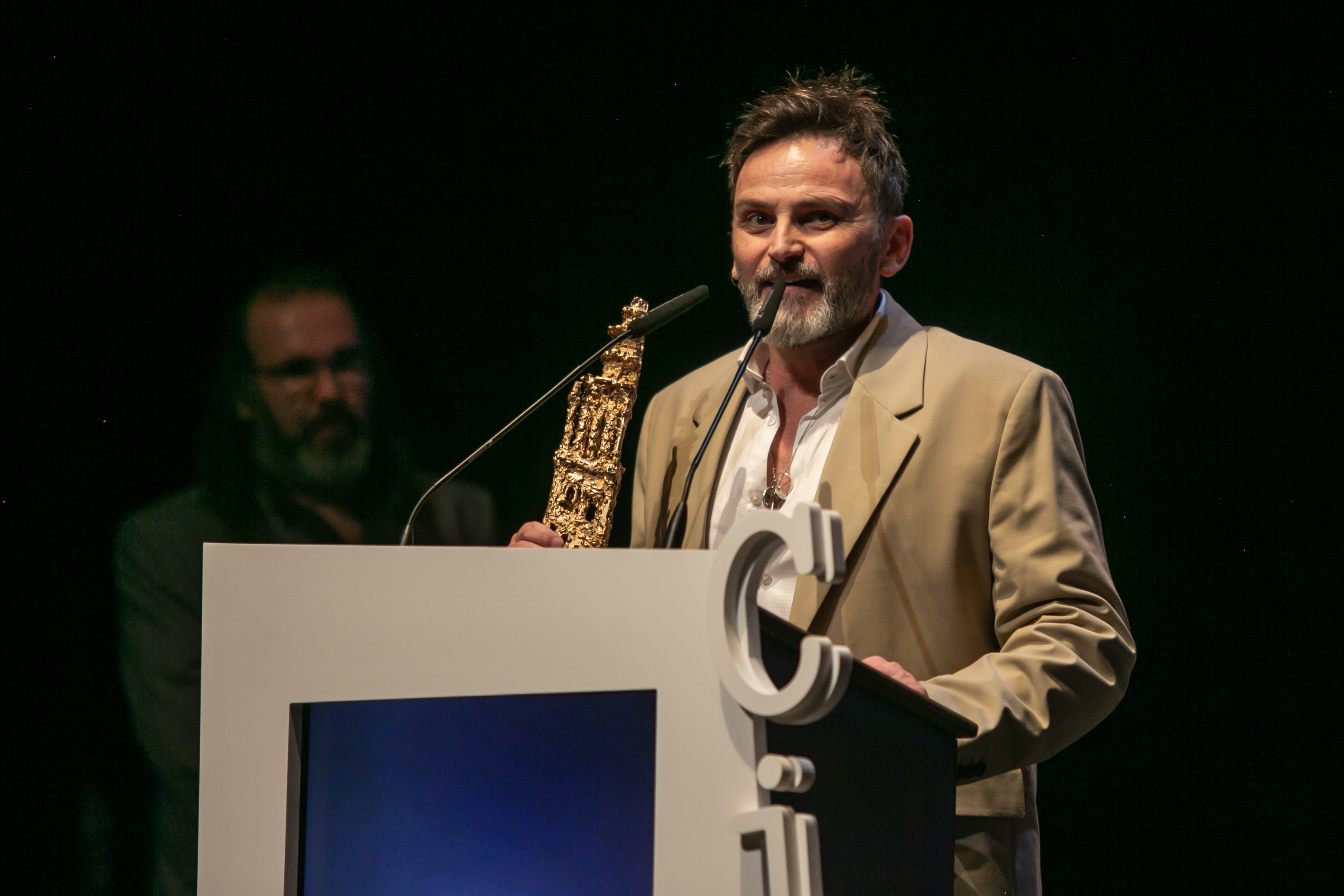
Tejero receiving an award at the Festival CiBRA in 2023

Year	Award	Category	Work	Result	Ref.
2004	18th Goya Awards	Best New Actor	Football Days	Won	
2004	13th Actors and Actresses Union Awards	Best Film Actor in a Secondary Role	Football Days	Nominated	
2004	13th Actors and Actresses Union Awards	Best New Actor	Football Days	Nominated	
2004	13th Actors and Actresses Union Awards	Best Television Actor in a New Role	Aquí no hay quien viva	Won	
2009	23rd Goya Awards	Best Supporting Actor	Chef's Special	Nominated	
2022	30th Actors and Actresses Union Awards	Best Film Actor in a Minor Role	The House of Snails	Nominated	
2023	2nd Carmen Awards	Best Supporting Actor	Prison 77	Nominated	
2023	37th Goya Awards	Best Supporting Actor	Prison 77	Nominated	
2023	31st Actors and Actresses Union Awards	Best Film Actor in a Secondary Role	Prison 77	Nominated	
2026	34th Actors and Actresses Union Awards	Best Film Actor in a Minor Role	The Captive	Nominated	

- TP de Oro: Best Television Actor (2004)
- Premio Fotogramas de Plata: Best Television Actor (2005)
