= Nerea Camacho =

Spanish actress (born 1996)

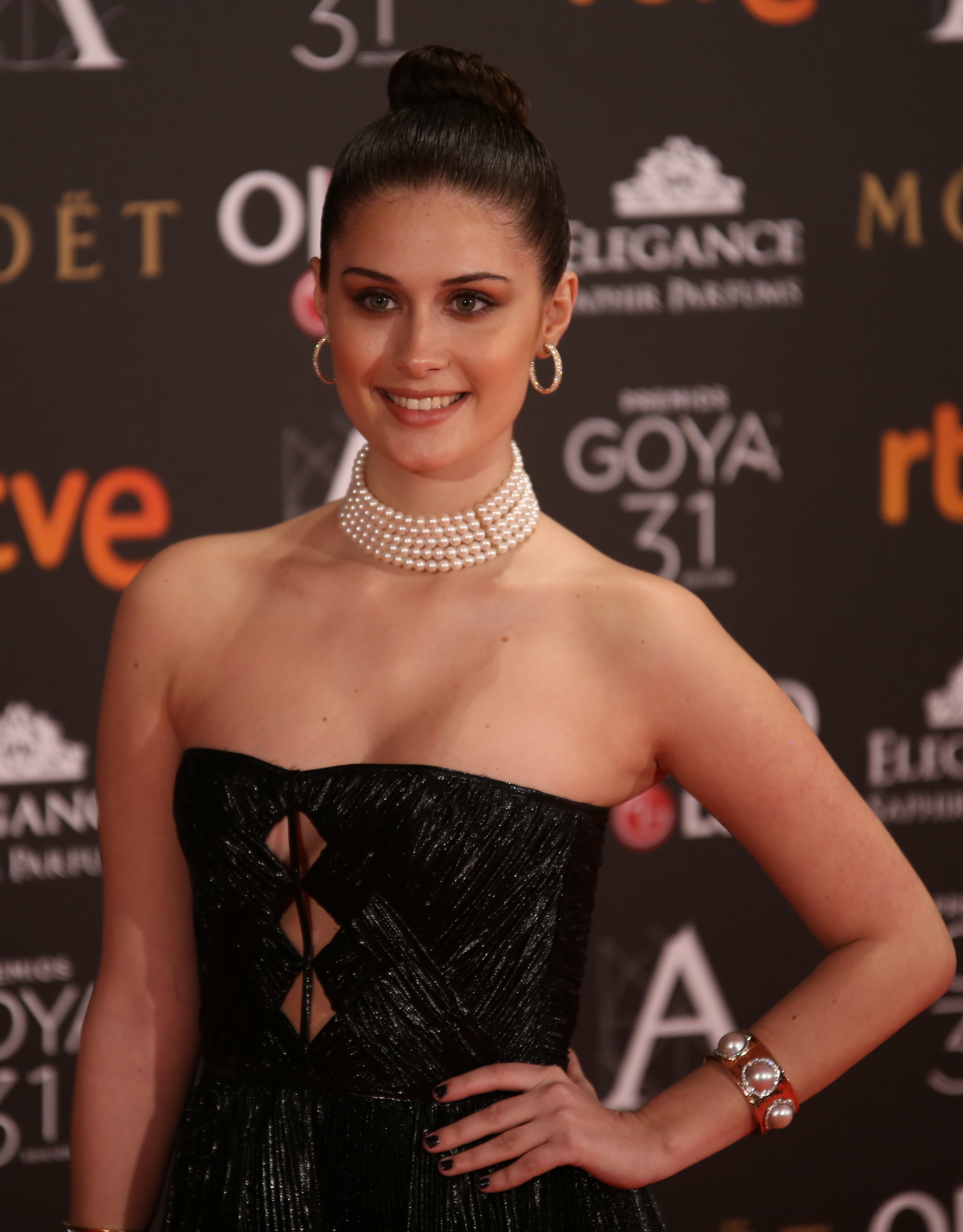
- At the 31st Goya Awards in 2017
- Born: Nerea Camacho Ramos; May 15, 1996 (age 29); Balanegra, Andalusia, Spain
- Occupation: Actress
- Years active: 2008–present
- Height: 170 cm (5 ft 7 in)

Nerea Camacho Ramos (born 15 May 1996) is a Spanish actress. Her first performance in the 2008 film Camino earned her the Goya Award for Best New Actress.

== Biography ==
Born on 15 May 1996 in Balanegra, province of Almería, Andalusia. Both of her parents were from Langreo and moved to Balanegra for work-related reasons. She began to train for theatrical plays when she was nine.

Camacho's debut as a film actress came in Javier Fesser's Camino (2008), where she played the leading character Camino, a 11-year old girl raised in an Opus Dei family who develops a terminal cancer. The performance earned her the Goya Award for Best New Actress in 2009 and opened the doors for her acting career.

Following her debut, she was cast in more main roles in feature films: she starred in Tres metros sobre el cielo (2010), the adaptation of the Federico Moccia's namesake novel, in which she played Dani, the younger sister of Babi (María Valverde). Also in 2010, she performed the role of Elena in the Pau Freixas' film Heroes.

She also starred in the 2011 drama La chispa de la vida (As Luck Would Have It), directed by Álex de la Iglesia, in which Camacho played Bárbara, one of the two children of the marriage formed by Luisa (Salma Hayek) and Roberto (José Mota). Together with her film activity, she also started in television, taking guest roles in series such as Los protegidos and El barco.

She reprised the role of Daniela in Tengo ganas de ti (2012), the sequel to Tres metros sobre el cielo.

She was given her first stable role in television as part of the cast of the limited series Bienvenidos al Lolita, aired in 2014 on Antena 3. She played Greta, a 16-year old girl who lives in the Lolita Cabaret surrounded by adults.

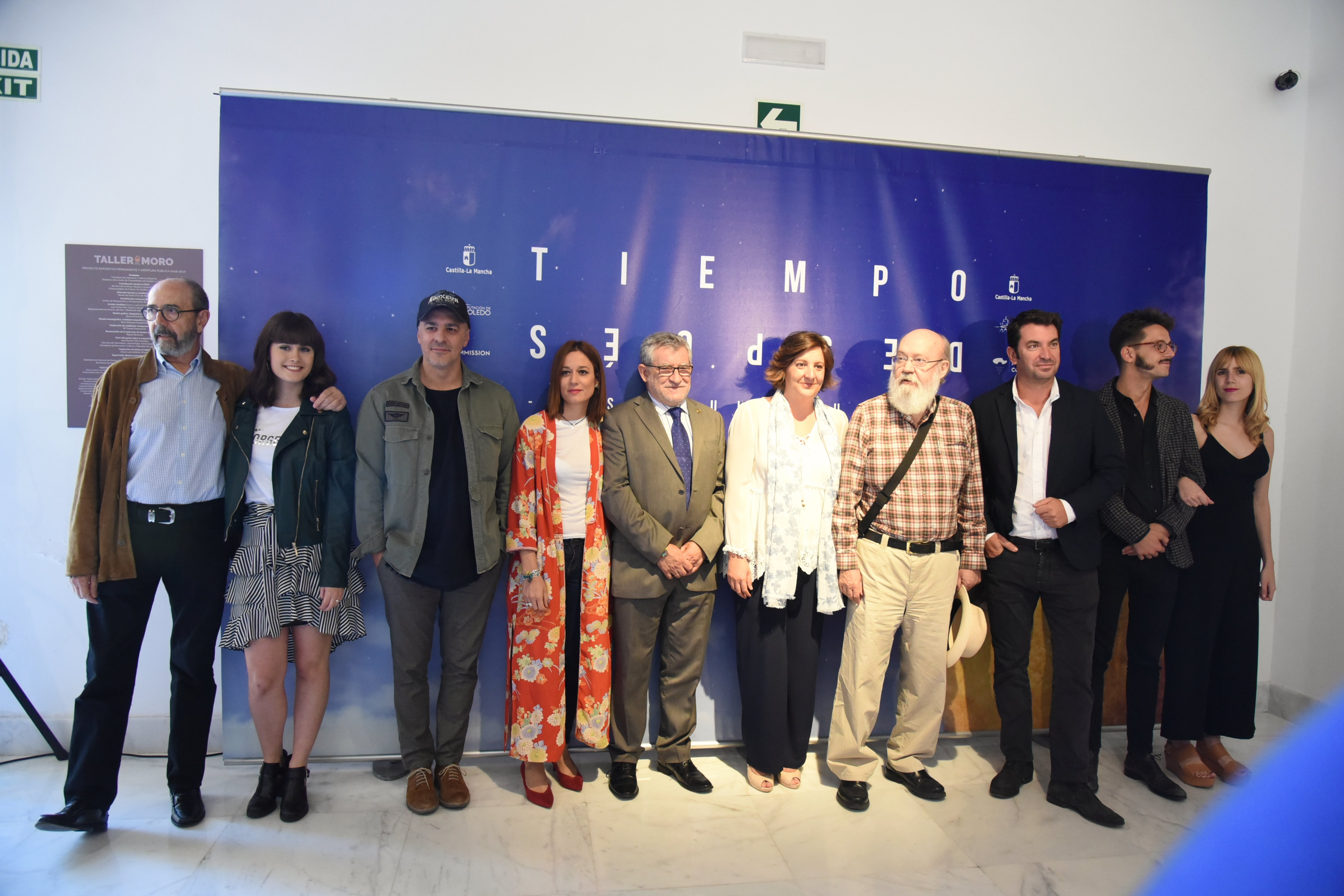
Camacho during a presentation of Tiempo después, together with the director and other members of the cast (October 2017)

Camacho joined the cast of the Colombian telenovela La esclava blanca (The White Slave), a historical drama involving slave trade. She played the leading character Victoria Quintero, an orphan young woman raised by rebel slaves. She also appeared in the 2017 Mexican telenovela En tierras salvajes, playing Alejandra Rivelles Zavala, the love interest of Uriel Santana, the stable boy of the Otero family.

Camacho starred in a minor role in José Luis Cuerda's Tiempo después (2018), a comedy set in a dystopia venturing into surrealism, playing Margarita, a role described as a sort of "choni from the future". In 2019, she appeared in the young-adult horror miniseries Terror.app, aired on Atresplayer Premium.

== Filmography ==
=== Films ===
| Year | Title | Role | Notes | Ref. |
|---|---|---|---|---|
| 2008 | Camino | Camino | Won—Goya Award for Best New Actress | |
| 2010 | Herois (Heroes) | Elena | | |
| 2010 | Tres metros sobre el cielo (Three Steps Above Heaven) | Daniela | | |
| 2011 | La chispa de la vida (As Luck Would Have It) | Bárbara | | |
| 2012 | Fuga | Sara | Short film | |
| 2012 | Tengo ganas de ti (I Want You) | Daniela | Same character as in Tres metros sobre el cielo | |
| 2018 | Tiempo después (Some Time Later) | Margarita | | |
| 2023 | Últimas voluntades (Last Wishes) | Sonia | | |
| 2024 | Barroz 3D | Isa Ron Madhav | Cameo | |

=== Television ===
| Year | Title | Role | Notes | Ref. |
|---|---|---|---|---|
| 2010 | Los protegidos (The Protected Ones) | Vanesa | Episode: "El accidente" (The Accident) | |
| 2013 | El Barco (The Ship) | Sandra | 1 episode | |
| 2014 | Bienvenidos al Lolita (Welcome to Lolita) | Greta Vidal | 8 episodes | |
| 2016 | La esclava blanca (The White Slave) | Victoria Quintero | Lead role | |
| 2017 | En tierras salvajes (In Wild Lands) | Alejandra Rivelles Zavala | | |
