= The Passenger (2021 film) =

- Theatrical release poster
- Spanish: La pasajera
- Directed by: Raúl Cerezo; Fernando González Gómez
- Written by: Luis Sánchez-Polack
- Based on: a previous script by Javier Echániz and Asier Guerricaechebarría
- Starring: Ramiro Blas; Cecilia Suárez; Paula Gallego; Cristina Alcázar
- Cinematography: Ignacio Aguilar
- Production companies: Persons Films; La Dalia Films; SG Producciones; Eye Slice Pictures
- Distributed by: Karma Films
- Release dates: 9 October 2021 (Sitges); 18 February 2022 (Spain)
- Country: Spain
- Language: Spanish

The Passenger (Spanish: La pasajera) is a 2021 Spanish science-fiction comedy horror road movie directed by Raúl Cerezo and Fernando González Gómez which stars Ramiro Blas, Cecilia Suárez, Paula Gallego, and Cristina Alcázar.

== Plot ==
Four people with different backgrounds (a skeevy driver, a religious Mexican, and a posh woman with her wayward teen daughter) coincide on a van trip across empty Spain. They come into contact with an extraterrestrial entity, which possesses women and chops off the head of men.

== Cast ==
- Ramiro Blas as Blasco
- Paula Gallego as Marta
- Cristina Alcázar as Lidia
- Cecilia Suárez as Mariela
- Niko Verona
- Yao Yao
- Carmen Ibeas

== Production ==
The screenplay was penned by Luis Sánchez-Polack based on a previous screenplay by Javier Echániz and Asier Guerricaechebarría. The Passenger is a Persons Films, La Dalia Films, SG Producciones and Eye Slice Pictures production, and it had support from Gobierno de Navarra and Navarra Film Office. It was fully shot in Navarre.

== Release ==
The film screened at the Sitges Film Festival on 9 October 2021. Distributed by Karma Films, it was theatrically released in Spain on 18 February 2022. Distributed by Dark Star Pictures, the film is set for a 3 June 2022 limited theatrical release in the United States, followed by a streaming and DVD release after 28 June.

== Reception ==
According to the American review aggregation website Rotten Tomatoes, The Passenger has a 73% approval rating based on 15 reviews from critics, with an average rating of 6.5/10.

Pablo Tocino of Mondosonoro scored 7 out of 10 points, considering that while Cristina Alcázar and Cecilia Suárez' performances are more than adequate, those of Ramiro Blas and Paula Gallego stand out in particular. Dennis Harvey of Variety assessed that even if fails at transcending "its basic creature-feature premise", the "stylish and humorous" film "does make getting to a familiar destination more fun than many a similar enterprise has managed". Miguel Ángel Romero of Cinemanía gave the film 2 out of 5 stars considering that the film, blending B movie exploitation and Spanish costumbrismo, features comedy moments alongside a great deal of cringe. Beatriz Martínez of El Periódico de Catalunya also rated it with 2 out of 5 stars, considering that even though the film achieves a personality of its own, the special effects do their job, and the film displays a "non-negligible" degree of visual imagination, there is something unsettling lurking throughout the film, namely the ambiguity towards machismo. Andrew Mack of ScreenAnarchy considered that the "little indie horror flick" stands out at "sprinkling all the action with dark humor", also praising Cerezo and Gómez for "doing as much in camera effects as possible" and the "terrific makeup effects".

== See also ==
- List of Spanish films of 2022
