= Road to Santiago =

- Theatrical release poster
- Spanish: Al final del camino
- Directed by: Roberto Santiago
- Screenplay by: Javier Gullón; Roberto Santiago
- Based on: an idea by Alan Smithee
- Produced by: Gonzalo Salazar-Simpson; Ignacio Salazar-Simpson; Mercedes Gamero; Tedy Villalba
- Starring: Malena Alterio; Fernando Tejero; Javier Gutiérrez; Diego Peretti; Javier Mora; Cristina Alcázar; Jorge Monje; Luis Callejo; Alberto Jo Lee; Ma-Ame Valmeo; Irene Escolar; Ana Milán
- Cinematography: Juan A. Castaño
- Edited by: Ángel Armada
- Music by: Ana Villa; Juanjo Valmorisco
- Distributed by: Warner Bros. Pictures
- Release date: 8 April 2009
- Country: Spain
- Language: Spanish

Road to Santiago (Spanish: Al final del camino, lit. 'At the end of the road') is a 2009 Spanish romantic comedy film directed by Roberto Santiago from a screenplay co-written by Javier Gullón starring Malena Alterio and Fernando Tejero alongside Javier Gutiérrez.

== Plot ==
Photographer Nacho and journalist Pilar feign to be a couple to investigate relationship guru Olmo while on the Way of St. James from Pedrafita do Cebreiro to Santiago de Compostela.

== Cast ==
- Malena Alterio as Pilar
- Fernando Tejero as Nacho
- Javier Gutiérrez as José
- Diego Peretti as Olmo
- Javier Mora as Antonio
- Cristina Alcázar as Bea
- Jorge Monje as Fran
- Luis Callejo as Arturo
- Alberto Jo Lee as Kim
- Ma-Anne Valmeo as Sum
- Irene Escolar as Laura
- Ana Milán as Inma

== Production ==
The film is an Antena 3 Films, Lazona, and Zircozine production. Shooting locations in Galicia included the Monte do Gozo.

== Release ==
The film was released theatrically in Spain by Warner Bros. Pictures on 8 April 2009 in 229 screens.

== Reception ==
Javier Ocaña of El País lamented that the film fails at the management of the comic tempo, as if the whole were made for retarded (or downright deaf) viewers.

Àlex Montoya of Fotogramas wrote that despite wasting the possibilities of the guru portrayed by Diego Peretti, the film works and ends up becoming "a light and inoffensive amusement that will not go down in history but it does ensure a pleasant time".

Irene Crespo of Cinemanía rated the film 1 out of 5 stars, deeming it to be "the most predictable and españolista comedy that not even Pajares and Esteso would have made".

== See also ==
- List of Spanish films of 2009
