= Fernando Higueras =

Spanish architect

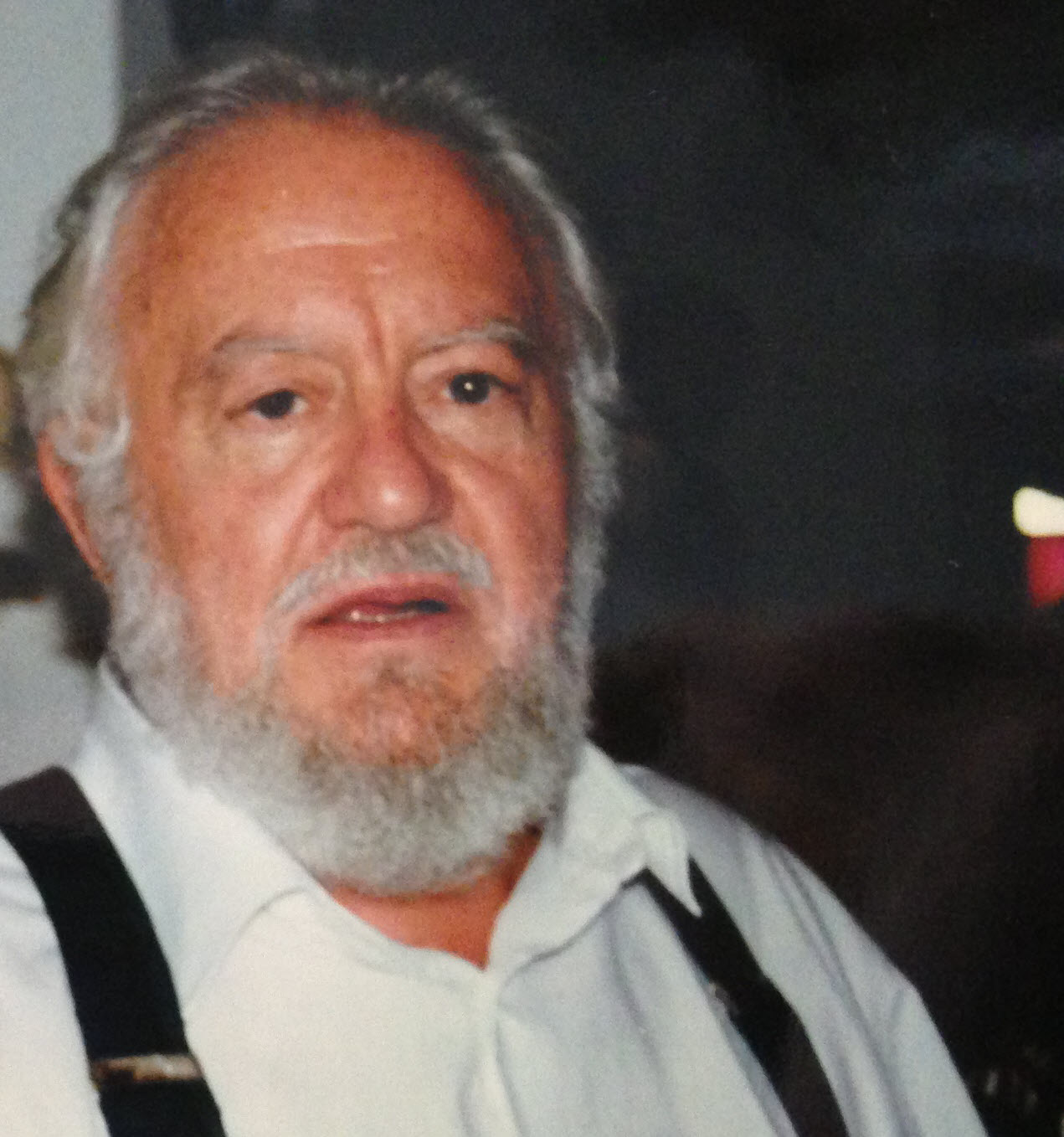
Arquitecto Fernando Higueras Díaz

Fernando de Higueras Díaz (November 26, 1930 – January 30, 2008) was a Spanish architect. He was one of the most famous architects in the world during the 1970s.

== Biography ==
He was born in Madrid. He graduated as an architect from the Superior Technical School of Architecture of Madrid in 1959. His work is recognized worldwide as an original and interesting union of constructivist, rationalist and organic architecture. Higueras was also a musician, a painter and photographer. He died in Madrid, at the age of 77.

Higueras's architecture displays a constructive adaptation to the natural and physical environment. His understanding of architecture came from popular contemporary approaches, and his spectacular but simple structural solutions, such as vaults, have been influential. His work appears at MoMA in New York.

Higueras's significant works include: the Spanish Pavilion located in New York City (1963), a multi-purpose building for Montecarlo (1969), the La Macarrona Residence in Somosaguas, Madrid (1971-1976), the Fierro House in Marbella (1971), the Castellana at number 266 Paseo de la Castellana in Madrid and the headquarters of the Spanish Cultural Heritage Institute (Spanish: "Instituto del Patrimonio Cultural de España"). He also designed the Museo de Antonio López Torres, in Tomelloso, Ciudad Real.

Higueras was the winner of several architectural competitions, including the Montecarlo Polivalet Building (1969) and the Ministry of Foreign Affairs in Abu Dhabi (1980).
