= Last Wishes =

- Theatrical release poster
- Spanish: Últimas voluntades
- Directed by: Joaquín Carmona Hidalgo
- Screenplay by: Salvador Serrano; Helio Mira
- Starring: Óscar Casas; Fernando Tejero; Nerea Camacho; Adriana Ozores; Carlos Santos
- Cinematography: Kike González
- Edited by: Ángel Armada
- Music by: Carla F. Benedicto
- Production companies: Biopic Films; Maskeline; La Charito Films
- Distributed by: Alfa Pictures
- Release date: 30 June 2023
- Country: Spain
- Language: Spanish

Last Wishes (Spanish: Últimas voluntades) is a 2023 Spanish thriller drama film directed by Joaquín Carmona Hidalgo which stars Óscar Casas, Fernando Tejero, Nerea Camacho, Adriana Ozores, and Carlos Santos.

== Plot ==
The plot concerns a father (Coque) trying to win back forgiveness from his son (Andrés) after leaving prison. Coque abandoned Andrés when the latter was a toddler.

== Cast ==
- Óscar Casas as Andrés
- Fernando Tejero as Coque
- Nerea Camacho as Sonia
- Adriana Ozores
- Carlos Santos as Julián
- Salvador Serrano
- Toni Medina
- Alfredo Zamora
- Rafa Sandoval

== Production ==
The screenplay was penned by Salvador Serrano (also featuring as a cast member) and Helio Mira. The film was produced by Biopic Films and Maskeline, a Visual Foundry alongside La Charito Films, with the participation of RTVE and 7 Televisión Región de Murcia. It also had support from the ayuntamientos of Molina de Segura, Fuente Álamo, Mazarrón and Calasparra. Shooting began in December 2021, but production was halted on 19 December due to a localised COVID-19 outbreak which affected several crew members. Once resumed in 2022, some characters were recast due to schedule obligations of the original cast, and thus Àlex Monner, Pepa Aniorte and Alberto San Juan were replaced by Óscar Casas, Adriana Ozores and Carlos Santos. Shooting re-started from scratch after the hiatus. It was shot in the Region of Murcia, including locations such as Murcia, Molina de Segura, Cartagena, Calasparra, Fuente Álamo, and Cehegín (Valentín).

== Release ==
Upon the wrap of shooting, the film's theatrical release was tentatively expected for late 2022. Distributed by Alfa Pictures, Last Wishes was released theatrically in Spain on 30 June 2023.

== Reception ==
Philipp Engel of Cinemanía rated the film 2 out of 5 stars, underscoring it to be a "a mix of genres that does not quite work".

Fausto Fernández of Fotogramas rated the "more than remarkable" film 4 out of 5 stars, finding a likeness of Tejero's Coque to Michael Caine's Carter in Get Carter.

== Accolades ==
Year	Award	Category	Nominee(s)	Result	Ref.
2023	14th Hollywood Music in Media Awards	Best Score – Independent Film (Foreign Language)	Carla F. Benedicto	Nominated	

== See also ==
- List of Spanish films of 2023
