= As Luck Would Have It =

- Sundance poster
- Spanish: La chispa de la vida
- Directed by: Álex de la Iglesia
- Written by: Randy Feldman
- Produced by: Andrés Vicente Gómez; Ximo Perez
- Starring: José Sánchez Mota; Salma Hayek; Blanca Portillo; Juan Luis Galiardo; Fernando Tejero; Manuel Tafallé; Antonio Garrido; Carolina Bang; Eduardo Casanova; Nerea Camacho; Joaquín Climent; Juanjo Puigcorbé; Antonio de la Torre; José Manuel Cervino; Santiago Segura
- Cinematography: Kiko de la Rica
- Edited by: Pablo Blanco
- Music by: Joan Valent
- Production companies: Al Fresco Enterprises; Trivision; La Ferme Productions; Double Nickel Entertainment
- Release dates: 30 November 2011 (Bilbao); 13 January 2012 (Spain)
- Running time: 95 minutes
- Country: Spain
- Language: Spanish
- Box office: $529,014

As Luck Would Have It (Spanish: La chispa de la vida) is a 2011 Spanish drama film directed by Álex de la Iglesia. It stars José Sánchez Mota and Salma Hayek. Mota plays an unemployed advertising executive who has a potentially life-threatening accident. Deciding to make the most of his predicament, he hires an agent and encourages a media frenzy as he struggles to survive.

== Plot ==
Roberto Gómez, a former advertising executive, has been unemployed for several years. Though he is happily married, he is depressed and feels as if he has failed his family. His wife, Luisa, attempts to cheer him up as he leaves for an interview with a former business partner and friend, Javier Gándara. When Roberto arrives, his former co-workers are distant and cold. Gándara tells him that there are no positions available, and Roberto leaves dejected. Remembering that his wife wants to vacation at the hotel where they spent their honeymoon, he impulsively drives off to visit it, only to find that it is now the site of a museum and important archeological dig. As Roberto wanders about the site during an important press event, he panics when he sees security guard Claudio and falls a great distance.

When Roberto discovers that he can not move his head, Claudio tells him that his skull has become impaled upon a spike. Claudio leaves to get help. Mayor Alcalde and museum director Mercedes attempt to delay the inevitable media frenzy, but the reporters eagerly descend upon Roberto once they realize there is a greater story than the archeological dig. Rumors and speculation begin to spread throughout the press, and Roberto's accident is reported as a suicide attempt. Roberto calls Luisa, and an emergency medical technician refuses to move him for fear of causing further injury. When nobody will take responsibility for moving him, they call in a medical doctor, Dr. Velasco. Velasco also refuses to move Roberto, and Mercedes and Alcalde debate how to resolve the situation without damaging either's career.

Due to his failure to provide for his family, Roberto resolves to exploit his situation to make as much money from it as possible. He hires an agent, Johnny, and the two attempt to sell product placements and exclusive interviews. Although Luisa is opposed to her husband's plans, she is unable to talk him out of it. Johnny catches the interest of media executive Álvaro Aguirre, but Aguirre will only pay the sums that Johnny desires if Roberto stays at the site of the accident, as an interview at the hospital is worthless to him. Aguirre offers several million euros for a posthumous interview, but Johnny is not able to convince him to invest the money without a guarantee. Luisa becomes concerned that Roberto is spending too much time on financials and not enough on talk to his family; at her urging, he calls their children and requests that they visit him.

Mercedes offers to cut free the spike, but the others stop her when it becomes obvious that it will only injure Roberto. After deliberating with another physician, Dr. Velasco decides to perform surgery at the site. Before the surgery, Johnny approaches Luisa and tells her of the offer for the posthumous interview. Enraged, she fires Johnny and threatens to attack him if he approaches Roberto again. Roberto, not knowing that she has fired Johnny, inquires as to the progress Johnny has made. Not wanting to upset Roberto, she tells him that Johnny has signed a contract worth hundreds of thousands of euros. Happy to have finally provided for his family financially, Roberto gives a heartfelt interview to Pilar Álvarez, a local television reporter handpicked by Luisa. Álvarez hands the tape to Luisa, knowing that it is worth millions to the proper buyer.

Roberto is lifted from the spike and becomes delirious. Brain damaged, he describes various smells as he bleeds profusely from the wound. Claudio consoles Luisa as she waits for Dr. Velasco's report. Some time later, Dr. Velasco grimly reappears. Roberto's family rushes to see him, only to find that he has died during surgery. The crowd, which has swelled greatly during the media frenzy, collectively reacts with dismay, and many of the people cry. Aguirre arrives at the museum and personally offers Luisa several million euros for the tape, which she silently and angrily refuses.

== Cast ==
- José Sánchez Mota as Roberto Gómez
- Salma Hayek as Luisa Gómez
- Blanca Portillo as Mercedes
- Juan Luis Galiardo as Alcalde
- Fernando Tejero as Johnny
- Manuel Tallafé as Claudio
- Santiago Segura as David Solar
- Antonio Garrido as Dr. Velasco
- Carolina Bang as Pilar Álvarez
- Eduardo Casanova as Lorenzo
- Nerea Camacho as Bárbara
- Joaquín Climent as Javier Gándara
- Juanjo Puigcorbé as Álvaro Aguirre
- Nacho Vigalondo as Martin
- José Manuel Cervino
- Antonio de la Torre

== Production ==
Shooting locations included Cartagena.

== Release ==
As Luck Would Have It received a pre-screening in Bilbao on 30 November 2011, predating the wide release date for Spanish theatres set for 13 January 2012. The international premiere was at the 2012 Berlin International Film Festival. IFC Midnight bought US and UK rights in April 2012.

== Reception ==
As of June 2020, the film holds a 38% approval rating on Rotten Tomatoes, a review aggregator, based on eight reviews with an average rating of 4.58 out of 10. Metacritic rated it 32/100 based on four reviews. Jonathan Holland of Variety called it "an entertaining but unsubtle satire" that "never develops much bite, though it does bare its fangs". David Rooney of The Hollywood Reporter wrote that "the satire lacks subtlety and bite", and the tone is too even. Jeannette Catsoulis of The New York Times wrote that it "combines lecture, farce and soapy sentiment in a single misshapen package".
