= Spanish Cultural Heritage Institute =

Spanish government organization

- Instituto del Patrimonio Cultural de España (Spanish)
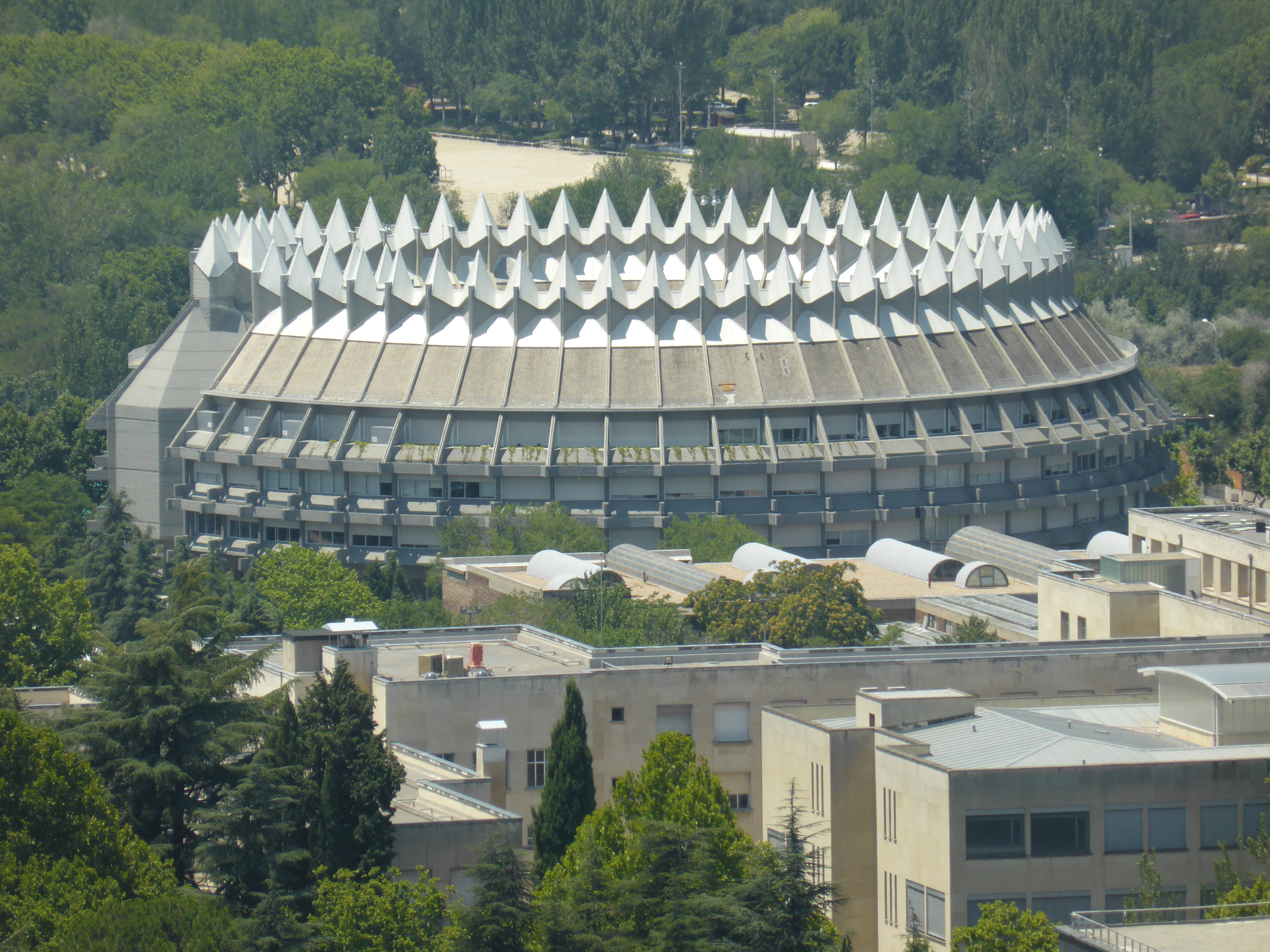

- Location within Spain
- 40.441136°N 3.734848°W
- Location: Madrid, Spain

Spanish Cultural Heritage
- Official name: Sede del Instituto del Patrimonio Cultural de España (IPCE)
- Type: Non-movable
- Criteria: Monument
- Designated: November 16, 2001
- Reference no.: RI-51-0010704

The Spanish Cultural Heritage Institute (IPCE) (Spanish: Instituto del Patrimonio Cultural de España) is an institution of the Ministry of Culture dedicated to the research, conservation and documentation of Spanish cultural heritage. It is attached to the Directorate-General for Cultural Heritage and Fine Arts.

== History ==
The Spanish Historical Heritage Institute (IPCE) was created in 1985 as the Cultural Assets Conservation and Restoration Institute. It is an institution of the Ministry of Culture dedicated to the research, conservation and documentation of Spanish cultural heritage. It is attached to the Directorate-General for Cultural Heritage and Fine Arts.

Conservation, research, training and diffusion are the basis of the IPCE structure. IPCE has specialists in various disciplines: architects, archaeologists, ethnographers, conservators, scientists, archivists, computer specialists and curators, among others.

== Headquarters ==
IPCE's headquarters is at Calle del Greco 4 in Madrid, Spain. Its building was designed in 1967 by architects Fernando Higueras and Antonio Miró Valverde, and built from 1967 to 1970. Commonly called "The Crown of Thorns" (La Corona de Espinas), the building was declared a Heritage Site of Cultural Interest (Bien de Interés Cultural) on November 16, 2001. This four-story, circular reinforced concrete building features a pointed or jagged cornice and is one of the most significant examples of contemporary Spanish architecture.
