= 16th Goya Awards =

- Date: 2 February 2002
- Site: Palacio Municipal de Congresos de Madrid
- Hosted by: Rosa Maria Sardà
- Organized by: Academy of Cinematographic Arts and Sciences of Spain

Highlights
- Best Film: The Others
- Best Actor: Eduard Fernández; Fausto 5.0
- Best Actress: Pilar López de Ayala; Mad Love
- Most awards: The Others (8)
- Most nominations: The Others (15)

Television coverage
- Network: TVE

The 16th Goya Awards was an awards ceremony that took place at the Palacio Municipal de Congresos in Madrid, Spain on 2 February 2002.

The Others won the award for Best Film.

== Winners and nominees ==
The winners and nominees are listed as follows:

Best Film: The Others; Don't Tempt Me; Mad Love; Sex and Lucia	Best Director: Alejandro Amenábar – The Others; Vicente Aranda – Mad Love; Agustín Díaz – Don't Tempt Me; Julio Medem – Sex and Lucia
Best Actor: Eduard Fernández – Fausto 5.0; Sergi López – Mine Alone; Eusebio Poncela – Intact; Tristán Ulloa – Sex and Lucia	Best Actress: Pilar López de Ayala – Mad Love; Nicole Kidman – The Others; Victoria Abril – Don't Tempt Me; Paz Vega – Mine Alone
Best Supporting Actor: Emilio Gutiérrez Caba – Ten Days Without Love; Antonio Dechent – Intact; Eduard Fernández – Sound of the Sea; Gael García – Don't Tempt Me	Best Supporting Actress: Rosa Maria Sardà – No Shame; Elena Anaya – Sex and Lucia; Najwa Nimri – Sex and Lucia; Rosana Pastor – Mad Love
Best Original Screenplay: Alejandro Amenábar – The Others; Don't Tempt Me – Agustín Díaz; Sex and Lucia – Julio Medem; Dominic Harari, Joaquín Oristrell, Teresa de Pelegrí, Cristina Rota – No Shame	Best Adapted Screenplay: Jorge Juan Martínez, Carlos Molinero, Clara Pérez, Lola Salvador – Savages; Lluís-Anton Baulenas, Ventura Pons – Anita Takes a Chance; Dominic Harari, Sigfrid Monleón, Teresa de Pelegrí, Ferran Torrent – The Dutchman's Island; Rafael Azcona – Sound of the Sea
Best New Actor: Leonardo Sbaraglia – Intact; Biel Durán – No Pain, No Gain; James Bentley – The Others; Rubén Ochandiano – Broken Silence	Best New Actress: Paz Vega – Sex and Lucia; Malena Alterio – The Hold-Up; María Isasi – Savages; Alakina Mann – The Others
Best Spanish Language Foreign Film: The Escape · Argentina; A Cab for Three · Chile; Honey for Oshun · Cuba; Violet Perfume: No One Is Listening · Mexico	Best European Film: Amélie · France; Billy Elliot · United Kingdom; Bridget Jones's Diary · United Kingdom; Chocolat · United Kingdom
Best New Director: Juan Carlos Fresnadillo – Intact; Javier Balaguer – Mine Alone; Víctor García León – No Pain, No Gain; Carlos Molinero – Savages	Best Animated Film: The Living Forest; La leyenda del unicornio; Manuelita; Un perro llamado Dolor
Best Cinematography: Javier Aguirresarobe – The Others; Xavi Giménez –Intact; Paco Femenía –Mad Love; Kiko de la Rica –Sex and Lucia	Best Editing: Nacho Ruiz Capillas – The Others; José Salcedo – Don't Tempt Me; Teresa Font – Mad Love; Iván Aledo – Sex and Lucia
Best Art Direction: The Others – Benjamín Fernández; Don't Tempt Me – Javier Fernández; Intact – César Macarrón; Mad Love – Josep Rosell	Best Production Supervision: The Others – Miguel Ángel González, Emiliano Otegui; Mad Love – Carlos Bernases; Don't Tempt Me – Angélica Huete; Intact – José Luis Jiménez
Best Sound: Tim Cavagin, Daniel Goldstein, Alfonso Raposo, Ricardo Steinberg – The Others; José Antonio Bermúdez, Diego Garrido, Pelayo Gutiérrez, Antonio Rodríguez 'Mármol', Nacho Royo – Don't Tempt Me; David Calleja, Daniel Fontrodona, James Muñoz – Mad Love; Polo González Aledo, Agustín Peinado, Alfonso Pino, Santiago Thévenet – Sex and Lucia	Best Special Effects: Reyes Abades, José María Aragonés, Carlos Martínez, Ana Núñez, Antonio Ojeda – ''Bunuel and King Solomon's Table; Félix Bergés, Derek Langley, Pedro Moreno, Rafael Solórzano – The Others; Félix Bergés, Pau Costa, Carlos Martínez, Ana Núñez, Antonio Ojeda, Raúl Romanillos – Intact; Reyes Abades, Carmen Aguirre, David Martí, Alfonso Nieto, Montse Ribé, Emilio Ruiz del Río – The Devil's Backbone
Best Costume Design: Javier Artiñano – Mad Love; José Vico – The Devil's Backbone; Alberto Luna – Off Key; Sonia Grande – The Others	Best Makeup and Hairstyles: Mercedes Guillot, Miguel Sesé – Mad Love; Manuel García, Ana Lozano, Antonio Panizza –Don't Tempt Me; Ruth García, Concha Martí – Bunuel and King Solomon's Table; Ana López-Puigcerver, Belén López-Puigcerver – The Others
Best Original Score: Alberto Iglesias –Sex and Lucia; Alejandro Amenábar –The Others; Bernardo Bonezzi – Don't Tempt Me; José Nieto – Mad Love	Best Original Song: Luz Casal — "Tu Bosque animado" – The Living Forest; Olga Román — "Again" – Ten Days Without Love; Clara Montes — "Sólo mía" – Mine Alone; Joaquín Sabina — "Semos diferentes" – Torrente 2: Mission in Marbella
Best Fictional Short Film: Desaliñada; Bamboleho; La mirada oblicua; La primera vez; Versión Original	Best Animated Short Film: Pollo; El Aparecido; La Colección; W.C.
Best Documentary: En construcción; Asesinato en febrero; Extranjeros de sí mismos; Los niños de Rusia

== Honorary Goya ==
- Juan Antonio Bardem
