= List of Spanish films of 2001 =

A list of Spanish-produced and co-produced feature films released in 2001 in Spain. When applicable, the domestic theatrical release date is favoured.

== Films ==
Release		Title (Domestic title)	Cast & Crew	Ref.
J A N U A R Y	19	Lázaro de Tormes	Director: Fernando Fernán Gómez, José Luis García Sánchez Cast: Rafael Álvarez "El Brujo", Karra Elejalde, Beatriz Rico, Manuel Alexandre, Álvaro de Luna, Agustín Gonzalez, José Lifante, Francisco Rabal, Francisco Algora, Juan Luis Galiardo, Emilio Laguna, Manuel Lozano, Tina Sainz	
J A N U A R Y	26	Waiting for the Messiah (Esperando al mesías)	Director: Daniel Burman Cast: Daniel Hendler, Héctor Alterio, Imanol Arias, Chiara Caselli, Stefania Sandrelli, Gabriela Acher	
F E B R U A R Y	2	Ten Days Without Love (El cielo abierto)	Director: Miguel Albaladejo Cast: Sergi López, Mariola Fuentes, María José Alfonso, Emilio Gutiérrez Caba, Geli Albaladejo	
M A R C H	2	No te fallaré	Director: Manuel Ríos Cast: Eva Santolaria, Antonio Hortelano, Fernando Guillén Cuervo, Sancho Gracia (Sandro)	
M A R C H	30	Torrente 2: Mission in Marbella (Torrente 2: Misión en Marbella)	Director: Santiago Segura Cast: Santiago Segura, Gabino Diego, Tony Leblanc, José Luis Moreno, Eloi Yebra, José Luis López Vázquez, Juanito Navarro	
A P R I L	20	The Devil's Backbone (El espinazo del diablo)	Director: Guillermo del Toro Cast: Marisa Paredes, Eduardo Noriega, Federico Luppi, Fernando Tielve, Íñigo Garcés, Irene Visedo, Francisco Maestre, José Manuel Lorenzo, Junio Valverde	(Note: Co-production Spain–Mexico (54%–46%).)
A P R I L	27	April Captains (Capitanes de abril)	Director: Maria de Medeiros Cast: Stefano Accorsi, Maria de Medeiros, Joaquim de Almeida, Fele Martínez	(Note: Co-production Spain–France–Italy–Portugal (20%–46%–10%–24%).)
A P R I L	27	Broken Silence (Silencio roto)	Director: Montxo Armendáriz Cast: Lucía Jiménez, Juan Diego Botto, Álvaro de Luna, María Botto, María Vázquez, Rubén Ochandiano	
M A Y	4	The Hold-Up (El palo)	Director: Eva Lesmes Cast: Adriana Ozores, Malena Alterio, Maribel Verdú, Carmen Maura	
M A Y	4	Arian's Journey (El viaje de Arián)	Director: Eduard Bosch Cast: Ingrid Rubio, Abel Folk, Sílvia Munt, Txema Blasco, Carlos Manuel Díaz	
M A Y	4	My Sweet (Mi dulce)	Director: Jesús Mora Cast: Aitana Sánchez-Gijón, Santiago Ramos, Bárbara Goenaga, Unax Ugalde, Arianna Puello	
M A Y	11	Lena	Director: Gonzalo Tapia Cast: Marta Larralde, Manuel Manquiña, Roberto Álvarez	
M A Y	18	His Master's Voice (La voz de su amo)	Director: Emilio Martínez Lázaro Cast: Eduard Fernández, Silvia Abascal, Joaquim de Almeida, Imanol Arias	
M A Y	25	Pau and His Brother (Pau i el seu germà)	Director: Marc Recha Cast: David Selvas, Alicia Orozco, Luis Hostalot, Marieta Orozco, Nathalie Boutefeu	
J U N E	8	Sound of the Sea (Son de mar)	Director: Bigas Luna Cast: Leonor Watling, Jordi Mollà, Eduard Fernández	
J U N E	8	La espalda de Dios	Director: Pablo Llorca Cast: Isabel Ampudia, Alberto Jiménez, Pedro Casablanc, Guillermo Toledo, Leonor Watling	
J U N E	29	No Shame (Sin vergüenza)	Director: Joaquín Oristrell Cast: Verónica Forqué, Candela Peña, Daniel Giménez Cacho, Rosa María Sardá, Jorge Sanz, Carmen Balagué, Elvira Lindo, Marta Etura, Dani Martín, Nur Levi	
J U L Y	6	No Pain, No Gain (Más pena que gloria)	Director: Víctor García León Cast: Biel Durán, Bárbara Lennie, Fernando Conde, Manuel Lozano	
J U L Y	20	Black Serenade (Tuno negro)	Director: Pedro Barbero & Vicente Martín Cast: Silke, Maribel Verdú, Jorge Sanz, Sergio Pazos, Eusebio Poncela, Fele Martínez	
A U G U S T	3	Fish People (Gente pez)	Director: Jorge Iglesias Cast: Juan Díaz, Diana Palazón, David Tenreiro, Iñaki Esnaola, Luke Donovan, Ion Gabella	
A U G U S T	24	Sex and Lucia (Lucía y el sexo)	Director: Julio Medem Cast: Paz Vega, Najwa Nimri, Elena Anaya, Tristán Ulloa	
A U G U S T	24	Killer Housewives (Marujas asesinas)	Director: Javier Rebollo Cast: Neus Asensi, Antonio Resines, Carlos Lozano, Nathalie Seseña, Pere Ponce, Karra Elejalde	
S E P T E M B E R	7	The Others (Los otros)	Director: Alejandro Amenábar Cast: Nicole Kidman, Fionnula Flanagan, Christopher Eccleston, Alakina Mann, James Bentley, Eric Sykes, Elaine Cassidy, Renée Asherson	
S E P T E M B E R	28	Mad Love (Juana la Loca)	Director: Vicente Aranda Cast: Pilar López de Ayala, Manuela Arcuri, Mercedes Morán, Eloy Azorín, Rosana Pastor, Héctor Colomé, Roberto Álvarez, Andrés Lima, Daniele Liotti	(Note: Co-production Spain–Italy–Portugal (70%–20%–10%).)
S E P T E M B E R	28	Savages (Salvajes)	Director: Carlos Molinero Cast: Marisa Paredes, Imanol Arias, Manuel Morón, Roger Casamajor, María Isasi, Alberto Ferreiro, Emilio Buale, Mario Pardo, Alicia Sánchez	
S E P T E M B E R	28	Luna's Game (Juego de Luna)	Director: Mónica Laguna Cast: Ana Torrent, Ernesto Alterio	
O C T O B E R	5	The Dutchman's Island (L'illa de l'holandès)	Director: Sigfrid Monleón Cast: Pere Ponce, Cristina Plazas, Féodor Atkine, Roger Casamajor, Juli Mira	
O C T O B E R	11	Visionaries (Visionarios)	Director: Manuel Gutiérrez Aragón Cast: Eduardo Noriega, Ingrid Rubio, Karra Elejalde, Fernando Fernán Gómez, Emma Suárez	
O C T O B E R	19	Fausto 5.0	Director: Alex Olle, Isidro Ortiz, Carlos Padrissa Cast: Miguel Ángel Solá, Eduard Fernández, Najwa Nimri, Raquel González, Juan Fernández, Irene Montalà, Pep Molina	
O C T O B E R	31	Dagon (Dagon: La secta del mar)	Director: Stuart Gordon Cast: Ezra Godden, Raquel Meroño, Paco Rabal, Uxía Blanco, Brendan Price, Macarena Gómez	
O C T O B E R	31	Clara y Elena	Director: Manuel Iborra Cast: Verónica Forqué, Carmen Maura, Jorge Sanz, Alexis Valdés, Fernando Delgado, Francesc Orella, Elena Ballesteros, Vanesa Cabeza, Amanda García	
O C T O B E R	31	Mine Alone (Solo mía)	Director: Javier Balaguer Cast: Sergi López, Paz Vega, Elvira Mínguez, Alberto Jiménez, María José Alfonso, Asunción Balaguer	
N O V E M B E R	2	Private Lives (Vidas privadas)	Director: Fito Páez Cast: Cecilia Roth, Gael García Bernal, Luis Ziembrowski, Chunchuna Villafañe, Lito Cruz, Carola Reyna, Héctor Alterio, Luis Machín, Dolores Fonzi	(Note: Co-production Spain–Argentina (30%–70%).)
N O V E M B E R	9	Intacto	Director: Juan Carlos Fresnadillo Cast: Leonardo Sbaraglia, Max von Sydow, Eusebio Poncela, Antonio Dechent, Mónica López	
N O V E M B E R	9	One of the Hollywood Ten (Punto de mira)	Director: Karl Francis Cast: Jeff Goldblum, Greta Scacchi, Ángela Molina, John Sessions, Geraint Wyn Davies, Antonio Valero, Christopher Fulford	(Note: Co-production Spain–United Kingdom (66%–34%).)
N O V E M B E R	9	Dama de Porto Pim	Director: Toni Salgot Cast: Emma Suárez, Sergio Peris-Mencheta, Antonio Resines	
N O V E M B E R	9	Buñuel y la mesa del rey Salomón	Director: Carlos Saura Cast: El Gran Wyoming, Pere Arquillué, Ernesto Alterio, Adrià Collado, Valeria Marini	
N O V E M B E R	9	The Lost Steps (Los pasos perdidos)	Director: Manane Rodríguez Cast: Irene Visedo, Luis Brandoni, Concha Velasco, Federico Luppi	
N O V E M B E R	30	Don't Tempt Me (Sin noticias de Dios)	Director: Agustín Díaz Yanes Cast: Penélope Cruz, Victoria Abril, Fanny Ardant, Gael García Bernal, Emilio Gutiérrez Caba, Juan Echanove, Cristina Marcos, Elena Anaya, Luis Tosar, Alicia Sánchez, Paz Gómez, Elsa Pataky, Gemma Jones	(Note: Co-production Spain–France–Italy (70%–20%–10%).)

== Box office ==
The ten highest-grossing Spanish films in 2001, by domestic box office gross revenue, are as follows:

Highest-grossing films of 2001
Rank	Title	Distributor	Admissions	Domestic gross (€)
1	The Others (Los otros)	Warner Sogefilms	6,242,330	26,560,672
2	Torrente 2: Misión en Marbella	Lolafilms	5,297,953	22,050,842
3	Mad Love (Juana la loca)	Warner Sogefilms	1,630,645	7,185,574
4	Sex and Lucia (Lucía y el sexo)	Warner Sogefilms	1,258,919	5,305,757
5	No te fallaré	Columbia TriStar	776,724	3,147,126
6	The Devil's Backbone (El espinazo del diablo)	Warner Sogefilms	705,531	2,981,037
7	Pellet (El Bola) ‡	Wanda Vision	642,559	2,586,447
8	Black Serenade (Tuno negro)	Lolafilms	575,471	2,284.859
9	Fish People (Gente pez)	Hispano Foxfilm	563,568	2,264.464
10	Don't Tempt Me (Sin noticias de Dios)	Lauren Film	500,142	2,288,206
‡: 2000 theatrical opening

== See also ==
- 16th Goya Awards
