= Ten Days Without Love =

- Theatrical release poster
- Spanish: El cielo abierto
- Directed by: Miguel Albaladejo
- Written by: Miguel Albaladejo; Elvira Lindo
- Produced by: Francisco Ramos; Fernando de Garcillán
- Starring: Sergi López; Mariola Fuentes; María José Alfonso; Geli Albadalejo; Emilio Gutiérrez Caba
- Cinematography: Alfonso Sanz Alduan
- Edited by: Ángel Hernández Zoido; Ascen Marchena
- Music by: Lucio Godoy
- Production company: Aurum PC
- Release date: 2 February 2001
- Running time: 110 minutes
- Country: Spain
- Language: Spanish

Ten Days Without Love (Spanish: El cielo abierto, lit. 'The Open Sky') is a 2001 Spanish film directed by Miguel Albaladejo starring Sergi López and Mariola Fuentes.

== Plot ==
Miguel's life changes completely when his wife starts a romance with his father. He is a psychiatrist, and one of his patients steals his wallet. When he goes to his place to retrieve it, he meets the patient's sister, Jasmina, an outspoken hairdresser. They fall in love, and everyone ends happily.

== Cast ==
- Sergi López as Miguel
- Mariola Fuentes as Jasmina
- María José Alfonso as Elvira
- Geli Albaladejo as Carola
- Emilio Gutiérrez Caba as David
- Marcela Wallerstein as Sara
- Javier Dorado as Paquito
- Antonia Sastre as Yolanda
- Pilar Barroso as Maruja
- Violeta Sánchez as Susi
- Félix Álvarez as Rober
- David Alcázar as Israel
- Elvira Lindo as Belinda

== Release ==
The film was theatrically released in Spain on 2 February 2001.

== Reception ==
Jonathan Holland of Variety deemed the "superbly scripted romance" to be "a deft, practiced piece of charming ensemble playing that presses all the right emotional buttons without forgoing its socio-critical edge".

== Accolades ==
Year	Award	Category	Nominee(s)	Result	Ref.
2002	16th Goya Awards	Best Supporting Actor	Emilio Gutiérrez Caba	Won	
2002	16th Goya Awards	Best Original Song	Olga Román	Nominated	

== See also ==
- List of Spanish films of 2001
