= List of awards and nominations received by Kristin Scott Thomas =

Kristin Scott Thomas awards and nominations
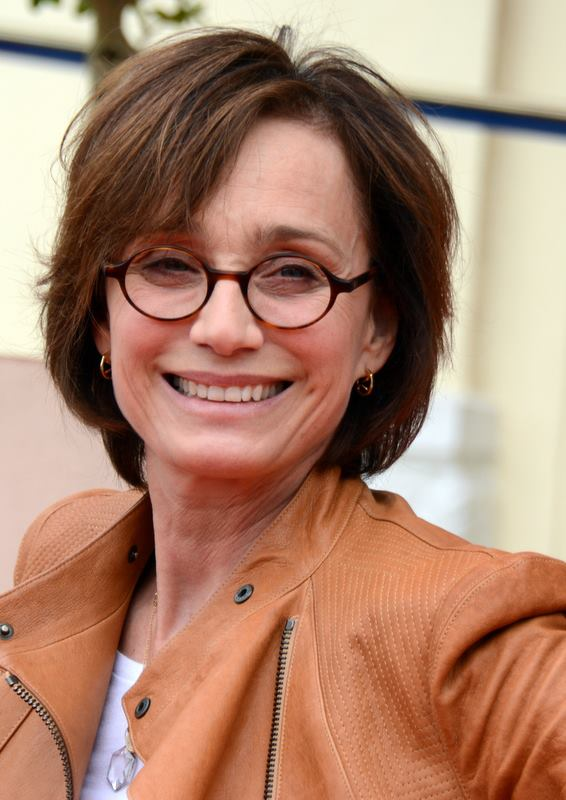
- Thomas in 2013
Awards and nominations
Award	Wins	Nominations
Academy Awards	0	1
Actor Awards	1	4
BAFTA Awards	1	5
Critics' Choice Awards	1	1
Emmy Awards	0	1
Golden Globe Awards	0	2
Olivier Awards	1	5

Totals (Note: Certain award groups do not simply award one winner. They acknowledge several different recipients, have runners-up, and have third place. Since this is a specific recognition and is different from losing an award, runner-up mentions are considered wins in this award tally. For simplification and to avoid errors, each award in this list has been presumed to have had a prior nomination.)
- Wins: 15
- Nominations: 49

Kristin Scott Thomas is an English actress known for her varied roles on stage and screen. She has received various accolades for her performances including an Actor Award, a BAFTA Award, a Critics' Choice Award, and Olivier Award as well as nominations for an Academy Award, three César Awards, a Primetime Emmy Award and two Golden Globe Awards. She was appointed Officer of the Order of the British Empire (OBE) in the 2003 and Dame Commander of the Order of the British Empire (DBE) in the 2015 for services to drama

Thomas had her breakthrough role in the British film A Handful of Dust (1988) earning the Evening Standard British Film Award for Most Promising Newcomer. She played Fiona, a woman with an unrequited crush in the Mike Newell directed romantic comedy Four Weddings and a Funeral (1994) earning the BAFTA Award for Best Actress in a Supporting Role. Thomas gained acclaim for her portrayal of Katharine Clifton an Englishwoman who embarks in a passionate affair during World War II in the Anthony Minghella directed historical romance epic The English Patient (1996). Her performance earned a nomination for the Academy Award for Best Actress, the BAFTA Award for Best Actress in a Leading Role, and the Actor Award for Outstanding Performance by a Female Actor in a Leading Role. She played an elegant yet unsatisfied wife of a wealthy industrialist in the Robert Altman murder-mystery Gosford Park (2001) earning the Actor Award for Outstanding Performance by a Cast in a Motion Picture.

She played a former prison inmate who tries to rebuild her life in the Philippe Claudel directed drama I've Loved You So Long (2008) for which she was nominated for the BAFTA Award for Best Actress in a Leading Role, the César Award for Best Actress, and the Golden Globe Award for Best Actress in a Motion Picture – Drama. She portrayed Mimi Smith in the British biographical drama Nowhere Boy (2009) for which she was nominated for the BAFTA Award for Best Actress in a Supporting Role. For her role as an American journalist living in Paris in the drama Sarah's Key (2010) she won the Lumière Award for Best Actress and was nominated for the César Award for Best Actress. She portrayed Clementine Churchill in the Joe Wright directed historical drama Darkest Hour (2017) for which she was nominated for the BAFTA Award for Best Actress in a Supporting Role.

On television, she had a guest role in the BBC One comedy-drama series Fleabag (2019) she was nominated for the Primetime Emmy Award for Outstanding Guest Actress in a Comedy Series. She played ruthless MI5 agent in the Apple TV+ spy series Slow Horses (2022–) earning an Outstanding Ensemble in a Drama Series. On stage, she portrayed Irina Arkadina, a fading actress in the West End production of the Anton Chekov play The Seagull (2007) for which she won the Laurence Olivier Award for Best Actress. She was further Olivier-nominated for her roles in Chekov's Three Sisters (2003), Harold Pinter's Betrayal (2011) and Old Times (2013), and the Sophocles play Electra (2014).

== Major associations ==
=== Academy Awards ===
Year	Category	Nominated work	Result	Ref.
1996	Best Actress	The English Patient	Nominated	

=== Actor Awards ===
Year	Category	Nominated work	Result	Ref.
1996	Outstanding Cast in a Motion Picture	The English Patient	Nominated	
1996	Outstanding Actress in a Leading Role	The English Patient	Nominated	
2001	Outstanding Cast in a Motion Picture	Gosford Park	Won	
2024	Outstanding Performance by an Ensemble in a Drama Series	Slow Horses	Nominated	

=== BAFTA Awards ===
Year	Category	Nominated work	Result	Ref.
British Academy Film Awards
1994	Best Actress in a Supporting Role	Four Weddings and a Funeral	Won	
1996	Best Actress in a Leading Role	The English Patient	Nominated	
2008	Best Actress in a Leading Role	I've Loved You So Long	Nominated	
2009	Best Actress in a Supporting Role	Nowhere Boy	Nominated	
2017	Best Actress in a Supporting Role	Darkest Hour	Nominated	

=== Critics' Choice Awards ===
Year	Category	Nominated work	Result	Ref.
Critics' Choice Movie Awards
2001	Best Cast	Gosford Park	Won	

=== Emmy Awards ===
Year	Category	Nominated work	Result	Ref.
Primetime Emmy Awards
2019	Outstanding Guest Actress in a Comedy Series	Fleabag	Nominated	

=== Golden Globe Awards ===
Year	Category	Nominated work	Result	Ref.
1996	Best Actress – Motion Picture Drama	The English Patient	Nominated	
2008	Best Actress – Motion Picture Drama	I've Loved You So Long	Nominated	

=== Laurence Olivier Awards ===
Year	Category	Nominated work	Result	Ref.
2003	Best Actress	Three Sisters	Nominated	
2007	Best Actress	The Seagull	Won	
2011	Best Actress	Betrayal	Nominated	
2013	Best Actress	Old Times	Nominated	
2014	Best Actress	Electra	Nominated	

== Miscellaneous awards ==
Organizations	Year	Award	Category	Result	Ref.
British Independent Film Awards	2008	Best Supporting Actress	Easy Virtue	Nominated	
British Independent Film Awards	2009	Best Supporting Actress	Nowhere Boy	Nominated	
César Awards	2008	Best Actress	I've Loved You So Long	Nominated	
César Awards	2009	Best Actress	Leaving	Nominated	
César Awards	2010	Best Actress	Sarah's Key	Nominated	
European Film Award	2008	Best Actress	I've Loved You So Long	Won	
Evening Standard British Film Awards	1988	Most Promising Newcomer	A Handful of Dust	Won	
Evening Standard British Film Awards	1994	Best Actress	Four Weddings and a Funeral	Won	
Evening Standard British Film Awards	1995	Best Actress	Angels & Insects	Won	
Evening Standard British Film Awards	2010	Best Actress	Leaving	Won	
Evening Standard British Film Awards	2017	Best Actress	The Party	Won	
Florida Film Critics Circle	2001	Best Cast	Gosford Park	Won	
Globe de Cristal Award	2009	Best Actress	Sarah's Key	Won	
Golden Raspberry Award	1986	Worst Supporting Actress	Under the Cherry Moon	Nominated	
Golden Raspberry Award	1986	Worst New Star	Under the Cherry Moon	Nominated	
Irish Film & Television Awards	2008	Best Actress	I've Loved You So Long	Nominated	
London Film Critics' Circle	2005	British Actress of the Year	Keeping Mum	Nominated	
London Film Critics' Circle	2008	British Actress of the Year	I've Loved You So Long	Won	
London Film Critics' Circle	2008	British Supporting Actress of the Year	Easy Virtue	Nominated	
London Film Critics' Circle	2009	British Supporting Actress of the Year	Nowhere Boy	Nominated	
Lumière Awards	2010	Best Actress	Sarah's Key	Won	
National Board of Review	1996	Best Supporting Actress	The English Patient	Nominated	
North Texas Film Critics Association	2017	Best Supporting Actress	Darkest Hour	Nominated	
Phoenix Film Critics Society	2001	Best Cast	Gosford Park	Nominated	
Phoenix Film Critics Society	2009	Best Supporting Actress	Nowhere Boy	Nominated	
Satellite Awards	1996	Best Actress – Motion Picture Drama	The English Patient	Nominated	
Satellite Awards	2001	Special Achievement – Ensemble Cast	Gosford Park	Won	
Satellite Awards	2008	Best Actress – Motion Picture Drama	I've Loved You So Long	Nominated	
Satellite Awards	2009	Best Supporting Actress – Motion Picture	Nowhere Boy	Nominated	
St. Louis Film Critics Association	2017	Best Supporting Actress	Darkest Hour	Nominated	
