= Anita Takes a Chance =

2001 film by Ventura Pons

- Film poster
- Catalan: Anita no perd el tren
- Directed by: Ventura Pons
- Written by: Ventura Pons; Lluís-Anton Baulenas
- Produced by: Ventura Pons
- Starring: Rosa Maria Sardà; José Coronado; María Barranco
- Production companies: Els Films de la Rambla, S.A.
- Distributed by: Lauren Film
- Release date: 26 January 2001
- Running time: 89 minutes
- Country: Spain
- Languages: Catalan; Spanish

Anita Takes a Chance (Catalan: Anita no perd el tren) is a 2001 film directed and co-written by Ventura Pons.

== Plot ==
Anita loses her lifetime job as a cinema attendant when the new owner wants to tear down the old theatre to build a new multiplex theatre. She continues going to the cinema place where she befriends a married excavator operator, Antonio, and she falls in love.

== Accolades ==
Year	Award	Category	Nominee(s)	Result	Ref.
2002	16th Goya Awards	Best Adapted Screenplay	Ventura Pons, Lluís-Antón Baulenas	Nominated	

== See also ==
- List of Spanish films of 2001
