= The Hold-Up =

- Theatrical release poster
- Spanish: El palo
- Directed by: Eva Lesmes
- Screenplay by: Luis Marías
- Produced by: César Benítez
- Starring: Adriana Ozores; Malena Alterio; Maribel Verdú; Carmen Maura
- Cinematography: Gonzalo F. Berridi
- Edited by: Mª Elena Sáinz de Rozas
- Music by: Manuel Villalta
- Production company: BocaBoca Producciones
- Distributed by: Columbia TriStar Films de España
- Release date: 4 May 2001
- Country: Spain
- Language: Spanish

The Hold-Up (Spanish: El palo) is a 2001 Spanish heist comedy film directed by Eva Lesmes from a screenplay by Luis Marías which stars Adriana Ozores, Malena Alterio, Maribel Verdú, and Carmen Maura.

== Plot ==
The plot follows an attempt of bank heist pulled by four women (including a cleaner working in the target bank, a pregnant hairdresser, and a street urchin).

== Cast ==
- Adriana Ozores as Lola
- Malena Alterio as Pecholata
- Maribel Verdú as Silvia
- Carmen Maura as Mayte
- Jaime Pujol as Gustavo
- Juan Gea as bank's manager
- Joaquín Climent as Enrique
- Antonia Martínez as the grandmother
- Alejandro Sigüenza as Daniel
- Diana Palazón

== Production ==
The screenplay was written by Luis Marías. 1962 comedy Atraco a las tres was an inspiration for The Hold-Up. The film, Eva Lesmes' sophomore feature, was produced by Bocaboca in association with Telecinco.

== Release ==
Distributed by Columbia TriStar, the film was theatrically released in Spain on 4 May 2001.

== Reception ==
Jonathan Holland of Variety deemed the film to be an "engaging femme comedy built around an unlikely bank heist" confirming helmer's talent for comedy.

== Accolades ==
Year	Award	Category	Nominee(s)	Result	Ref.
2002	16th Goya Awards	Best New Actress	Malena Alterio	Nominated	

== See also ==
- List of Spanish films of 2001
