= The Dutchman's Island =

- Theatrical release poster
- Catalan: L'illa de l'holandès
- Directed by: Sigfrid Monleón
- Screenplay by: Sigfrid Monleón; Ferran Torrent; Teresa de Pelegrí; Dominic Harari
- Based on: L'illa de l'holandès by Ferran Torrent
- Produced by: Emilio Oviedo; Antonio Chavarrías
- Starring: Pere Ponce; Cristina Plazas; Féodor Atkine; Juli Mira; Roger Casamajor; Francesc Garrido; Dafnis Balduz; Emma Vilarasau
- Cinematography: Andreu Rebés
- Edited by: Joaquín Ojeda
- Music by: Pascal Comelade; José Manuel Pagán
- Production companies: Nisa Producciones; Oberon Cinematogràfica
- Distributed by: Lauren Film
- Release dates: June 2001 (Málaga); 5 October 2001 (Spain)
- Country: Spain
- Language: Catalan

The Dutchman's Island (Catalan: L'illa de l'holandès) is a 2001 Spanish drama film directed by Sigfrid Monleón based on the novel by Ferran Torrent. It stars Pere Ponce and Cristina Plazas.

== Plot ==
In 1969, during the late Francoist dictatorship, university lecturer Lluís Dalmau is deported to a Spanish island on the Mediterranean Coast in which the inhabitants face the prospect of the arrival of tourism and the potential demise of the traditional salt industry. He falls for feral farmer Feli.

== Cast ==
- Pere Ponce as Lluís Dalmau
- Cristina Plazas as Feli
- Juli Mira as Dr. Ferrús
- Roger Casamajor as Rafael Salgado
- Francesc Garrido as Josep Martí
- Féodor Atkine as Patrice

== Production ==
The film was produced Oberon Cinematografica and Nisa Producciones and it had the association of TVE, Canal+, TVC, and TVV. It was shot in Valencian (Catalan) and other languages in locations such as Formentera, Ibiza, Barcelona, and Valencia.

== Release ==
The film premiered at the Málaga Film Festival. Distributed by Lauren Film, it was released theatrically in Spain on 5 October 2001.

== Reception ==
Jonathan Holland of Variety deemed the film to be "satisfyingly rounded island yarn combining intrigue and romance", featuring "good performances from an experienced but low-profile cast", "a skillfully crafted script and airy charm".

== Accolades ==
Year	Award	Category	Nominee(s)	Result	Ref.
2001	4th Málaga Film Festival	Best Music	José Manuel Pagán, Pascal Comelade	Won	
2002	16th Goya Awards	Best Adapted Screenplay	Sigfrid Monleón, Ferran Torrent, Teresa de Pelegrí, Dominic Harari	Nominated	

== See also ==
- List of Spanish films of 2001
