= Savages (2001 film) =

- Theatrical release poster
- Spanish: Salvajes
- Directed by: Carlos Molinero
- Screenplay by: Jorge Juan Martínez; Carlos Molinero; Clara Pérez Escrivá; Salvador Maldonado
- Based on: Salvajes by José Luis Alonso de Santos
- Produced by: Lola Salvador
- Starring: Marisa Paredes; Imanol Arias; Manuel Morón; Roger Casamajor; María Isasi; Alberto Ferreiro; Emilio Buale; Mario Pardo; Alicia Sánchez
- Cinematography: Gerardo Gormezano
- Edited by: Renato Sanjuán; José Recuenco
- Music by: Luis Mendo
- Production companies: Brothers & Sisters; Passion Walls; Línea Sur PC
- Distributed by: Alta Classics
- Release date: 28 September 2001 (Spain)
- Country: Spain
- Language: Spanish

Savages (Spanish: Salvajes) is a 2001 drama film directed by Carlos Molinero based on the play of the same name by José Luis Alonso de Santos. It stars Marisa Paredes and Imanol Arias.

== Plot ==
The fiction is set in Valencia, in the Mediterranean coast. A nurse (Berta) feels obliged to provide support to her deceased sister's three orphaned children: Raúl and Guillermo (two males members of neo-Nazi groupuscules), and Lucía (infatuated with Fausto, involved in the smuggling of immigrants to Europe). Berta's love affair with Eduardo (a policeman suffering from cirrhosis and Berta's patient) is disrupted by the latter's suspicion about the brutal murder of an immigrant, which the policeman attributes to Berta's nephews.

== Cast ==
- Marisa Paredes as Berta
- Imanol Arias as Eduardo
- Manuel Morón as Morís
- Roger Casamajor as Guillermo
- María Isasi as Lucía
- Alberto Ferreiro as Raúl
- Emilio Buale as Omar
- Mario Pardo as Turuta
- Alicia Sánchez as Amparo
- José Luis Alcobendas as Fausto
- Carmen Balagué as Sonsoles
- Petra Martínez as Conchita
- Consuelo Trujillo as Madre
- Silvia Casanova as Milagros
- Conchita Goyanes as Ángela
- Darío Paso as Fino

== Production ==
An adaptation of the 1998 play Salvajes by José Luis Alonso de Santos, the screenplay was penned by Jorge Juan Martínez, Carlos Molinero, Clara Pérez Escrivá, and Salvador Maldonado.

The film was produced by Lola Salvador's production company Brothers & Sisters alongside Passion Walls and Línea Sur PC, and it had the participation of TVE and Canal+.

== Release ==
Distributed by Alta Classics, the film was theatrically released in Spain on 28 September 2001. It was also selected for the 49th San Sebastián International Film Festival's 'New Directors' lineup.

== Reception ==
David Rooney of Variety deemed the "gritty, gripping tale of fanatical hatred in coastal Valencia" to be "stylishly directed and convincingly performed by a strong cast", adherence to the "vogue for convulsive hand-held camerawork" notwithstanding.

== Accolades ==
Year	Award	Category	Nominee(s)	Result	Ref.
2002	16th Goya Awards	Best New Director	Carlos Molinero	Nominated	
2002	16th Goya Awards	Best Adapted Screenplay	Jorge Juan Martínez, Carlos Molinero, Clara Pérez Escrivá, Salvador Maldonado	Won	
2002	16th Goya Awards	Best New Actress	María Isasi	Nominated	

== See also ==
- List of Spanish films of 2001
