= Mine Alone =

2001 film

- Theatrical release poster
- Spanish: Solo mía
- Directed by: Javier Balaguer
- Screenplay by: Álvaro García Mohedano; Javier Balaguer
- Produced by: Juan Alexander
- Starring: Sergi López; Paz Vega; Elvira Mínguez; Alberto Jiménez; María José Alfonso; Beatriz Bergamín; Asunción Balaguer; Luis Hostalot; Borja Elgea; Ginés García Millán
- Cinematography: Juan Molina
- Edited by: Guillermo Represa
- Production company: Star Line Productions
- Distributed by: Buena Vista International Spain
- Release dates: 26 October 2001 (Seminci); 31 October 2001 (Spain)
- Running time: 1h 40min
- Country: Spain
- Language: Spanish

Mine Alone (Spanish: Sólo mía) is a 2001 Spanish drama film directed by Javier Balaguer. It stars Sergi López and Paz Vega alongside Elvira Mínguez.

== Plot ==
The plot follows a situation of intimate partner violence enacted by Joaquín (a successful publicist) on Ángela (a company receptionist), shortly after their marriage.

== Cast ==
- Sergi López as Joaquín
- Paz Vega as Ángela
- Elvira Mínguez as Andrea
- Alberto Jiménez as Alejandro
- María José Alfonso as Ángela's mother
- Beatriz Bergamín as Cuñada Ángela
- Asunción Balaguer as Ángela's aunt
- Ginés García Millán as Hermano Ángela
- Luis Hostalot as Abogado
- Borja Elgea
- Blanca Portillo as Abogada

== Production ==
The screenplay was penned by Álvaro García Mohedano and Javier Balaguer. The film is a Star Line production, with the participation of TVE and Vía Digital. Juan Alexander was credited as producer. Juan Molina worked as cinematographer whereas Guillermo Represa took over film editing.

== Release ==
The film screened as the opening film of the 46th Valladolid International Film Festival (Seminci) on 26 October 2001. Distributed by Buena Vista International Spain, the film was theatrically released in Spain on 31 October 2001.

== Reception ==
Jonathan Holland of Variety wrote that Javier Balaguer's debut film, featuring "superb script and sterling performances" is "an intense, gripping and timely exploration of domestic violence".

The review in Fotogramas rated the film 3 out of 5 stars, extolling the "superb" performance delivered by Paz Vega, while pointing out at "a certain predictability, which can only be attributed to reality" as a negative point.

== Accolades ==
| Year | Award | Category | Nominee(s) | Result | Ref. |
|---|---|---|---|---|---|
| 2002 | 16th Goya Awards | Best New Director | Javier Balaguer | Nominated | |
| 2002 | 16th Goya Awards | Best Actress | Paz Vega | Nominated | |
| 2002 | 16th Goya Awards | Best Actor | Sergi López | Nominated | |
| 2002 | 16th Goya Awards | Best Original Song | Eusebio Bonilla, Clara Montes | Nominated | |

== See also ==
- List of Spanish films of 2001
