= No Shame (film) =

2001 film by Joaquín Oristrell

- Theatrical release poster
- Directed by: Joaquín Oristrell
- Screenplay by: Joaquín Oristrell; Dominic Harari; Teresa de Pelegrí; Cristina Rota
- Produced by: Gerardo Herrero; Eduardo Campoy
- Starring: Verónica Forqué; Daniel Giménez Cacho; Candela Peña; Carmen Balagué; Elvira Lindo; Jorge Sanz; Rosa María Sardá
- Cinematography: Jaume Peracaula
- Edited by: Miguel A. Santamaría
- Music by: José Carlos Gómez
- Release date: 2001
- Country: Spain
- Language: Spanish

No Shame (Spanish: Sin vergüenza) is a 2001 Spanish comedy-drama film directed by Joaquín Oristrell from a screenplay by Oristrell, Teresa de Pelegrí, Dominic Harari, and Cristina Rota. Its cast features Verónica Forqué, Daniel Giménez Cacho, Candela Peña, Carmen Balagué, Jorge Sanz, and Rosa María Sardá. The films received two Goya Award nominations, winning Best Supporting Actress (Sardà).

== Plot ==
21 years after a brief romantic affair involving acting teacher Isabel and filmmaker Mario Fabra, they meet up again upon the former's finding of a film screenplay authored by the latter based on their story together. They are now dating younger partners, respectively body language coach Alberto and low self-esteem television actress Cecilia.

== Cast ==
- Verónica Forqué as Isabel
- Daniel Giménez Cacho as Mario Fabra
- Candela Peña as Cecilia
- Carmen Balagué as Nacha
- Jorge Sanz as Alberto
- Rosa María Sardá as Ronda
- Marta Etura as Belén
- Dani Martín as Felipe
- Nur Al Levi
- Nacho Casalvaque
- Cecilia Freire
- Pablo Quejido
- Susana Rubio
- Pedro Aunión
- Pedro Miguel Martínez
- Elvira Lindo

== Production ==
Other crew responsibilities were entrusted to Jaume Peracaula (cinematography), Miguel A. Santamaría (editing), and José Carlos Gómez (music).

No Shame was the feature film acting debut for actress Marta Etura.

== Awards and nominations ==
Year	Award	Category	Nominee(s)	Result	Ref.
2001	4th Málaga Film Festival	Best Film		Won	
2001	4th Málaga Film Festival	Best Screenplay	Teresa de Pelegrí, Dominic Harari, Joaquín Oristrell, Cristina Rota,	Won	
2001	4th Málaga Film Festival	Best Actress	Verónica Forqué	Won	
2002	16th Goya Awards	Best Original Screenplay	Teresa de Pelegrí, Dominic Harari, Joaquín Oristrell, Cristina Rota	Nominated	
2002	16th Goya Awards	Best Supporting Actress	Rosa Maria Sardà	Won	

== See also ==
- List of Spanish films of 2001
