= No Pain, No Gain (2001 film) =

- Theatrical release poster
- Spanish: Más pena que gloria
- Directed by: Víctor García León
- Screenplay by: Jonás-Groucho; Víctor García León
- Produced by: Ana Huete
- Starring: Bárbara Lennie; Biel Durán; Fernando Conde; Asunción Planas; Manuel Lozano; María Galiana; Alicia Sánchez; Enrique San Francisco
- Music by: Diego San José
- Production company: Olmo Films
- Distributed by: Alta Classics
- Release dates: June 2001 (Málaga); 6 July 2001 (Spain)
- Country: Spain
- Language: Spanish
- Budget: 138 million ₧

No Pain, No Gain (Spanish: Más pena que gloria) (Note: lit. ''More grief than glory''. The original title is also a pun as Gloria is also the name of a character. This is foregrounded by the original film poster (primarily displaying the aforementioned character) and its disjointed tipography.) is a 2001 Spanish film directed by Víctor García León which stars Bárbara Lennie and Biel Duran.

== Plot ==
Displaying a far from idyllic vision of the teenage years, the fiction follows David, a teenager who finds out that, like everyone else, he is actually quite of a loser.

== Cast ==
- Biel Durán as David
- Bárbara Lennie as Gloria
- Manuel Lozano as Lucas
- Fernando Conde as Rafael
- Asunción Planas as Carmen
- Pilar Duque as Marta
- Jesús Beltrán as Nacho
- Rubén López as Pep
- Ángela Cremonte as Alexia
- Alberto Ferreiro as Gonzalo
- Luis Vallejo as Perandones
- Ricky Andrés Sierra as Tavero
- Manuel García as Laviña
- María Galiana as Teresa
- Alicia Sánchez as Karen
- Enrique San Francisco as Enrique

== Production ==
The screenplay was penned by the director Víctor García León alongside Jonás-Groucho. The score was composed by Diego San José. Ana Huete took over production duties. An Olmos Films production, the film had a 138 million ₧ budget.

== Release ==
The film screened at the Málaga Spanish Film Festival in June 2001, where it was well received. Distributed by Alta Classics, the film was theatrically released in Spain on 6 July 2001.

== Accolades ==
Year	Award	Category	Nominee(s)	Result	Ref.
2001	4th Málaga Spanish Film Festival	Silver Biznaga for Best Actor	Biel Durán	Won	
2002	16th Goya Awards	Best New Director	Víctor García León	Nominated	
2002	16th Goya Awards	Best New Actor	Biel Durán	Nominated	

== See also ==
- List of Spanish films of 2001
