= Sex and Lucia =

2001 film directed by Julio Médem

- Theatrical release poster
- Spanish: Lucía y el sexo
- Directed by: Julio Medem
- Written by: Julio Medem
- Produced by: Fernando Bovaira; Enrique López Lavigne
- Starring: Paz Vega; Tristán Ulloa; Najwa Nimri; Daniel Freire; Javier Cámara; Silvia Llanos; Elena Anaya
- Cinematography: Kiko de la Rica
- Edited by: Iván Aledo
- Music by: Alberto Iglesias
- Production company: Sogecine
- Distributed by: Warner Sogefilms
- Release date: 24 August 2001
- Running time: 128 minutes
- Country: Spain
- Language: Spanish
- Box office: $7.6 million

Sex and Lucia (Spanish: Lucía y el sexo) is a 2001 Spanish drama film written and directed by Julio Medem, and starring Paz Vega and Tristán Ulloa, alongside Najwa Nimri, Daniel Freire, Javier Cámara, Silvia Llanos and Elena Anaya.

== Plot ==
Lucía, a waitress, is talking on the phone with her depressed writer boyfriend Lorenzo after they had a bitter argument and she walked out. Since he has been in a 'funk' for a while, she is worried and goes home to console him. Finding an empty apartment, Lucía is frantic. She receives a phone call from the police while finding a suicide note and is so afraid of bad news that she hangs up, assuming the worst. They call back, but she ignores the ringing phone, packs a bag, and flees. Looking for a new beginning, Lucía travels to the mysterious Balearic Islands that Lorenzo had always talked of, but had recently been very negative about.

Six years earlier, Lorenzo is having casual sex in the ocean on a bright moon-lit night with a beautiful married woman he had just met named Elena. They part ways, expecting never to see each other again. She discovers she is pregnant with his child, and tries to find him, but is unable to since she knows little about him.

Later, as Lorenzo talks with his literary agent at a restaurant, discussing his writer's block, Lucía catches his attention as he gets up from his table to get cigarettes. She asks to speak to him and he joins her. She brazenly tells him that ever since she read his latest book, she has been following him and has fallen passionately in love with him. A smitten Lorenzo immediately engages the sexy, passionate Lucía and she moves into Lorenzo's apartment.

The film then interweaves the past and present, both of the characters in the film, and of the characters in Lorenzo's novel.

Lorenzo repeatedly stalls for time on his new book with his editor, while his relationship with Lucía deepens. About six years pass. Lorenzo learns he has a daughter as a result of his encounter with Elena and begins to visit the child outside of her school, meeting her babysitter Belén.

Belén tells Lorenzo her mother is a recently retired porn actress with a new hot boyfriend, and virtually seduces Lorenzo with chatter of sexual context and banter about her fantasies. Lorenzo uses these encounters and his fantasies about Belén and her mother as content for his book, and Lucía reads about it, thinking it fiction. Meanwhile, he does not disclose his fatherhood to Lucía or the child, nor even attempt to contact Elena.

Belén flirts with Lorenzo and eventually invites him over to Elena's house while she babysits his daughter, Luna. Lorenzo tells Luna a bedtime story, and after she falls asleep, he and Belén begin to have sex. They are interrupted as Luna knocks at the bedroom door, and they watch in horror as the family dog, a large Rottweiler in 'protect mode', kills Luna. Belén is stunned. Lorenzo runs away and falls into a deep depression.

Lorenzo's writing turns dark, towards depraved sex and death. He anonymously contacts Elena, who has moved to the island to find solace and recall better days and provides her a nice story about a beautiful child that loves to swim in the sea, to cheer her spirits. But his now guilt-ridden and uncommunicative relationship with Lucía begins to collapse.

Back in the present, Lucía meets a scuba diver on the island, Carlos, and through him, Elena, who runs an inn on the island. Lucía rents a room, and the women bond as friends, not knowing their intimate connection. But when Lucía mentions Lorenzo by name, and his past visit to the island long ago, Elena deduces the connection. Lucía sees a picture of Luna (looking remarkably like her father and remembering the name from Lorenzo's novel) and she makes the connection too.

Lorenzo's editor visits Lorenzo in the hospital, where he was taken after being in an 'accident', spending several weeks in recovery. When Lorenzo asks about Lucía, the editor tells Lorenzo that Lucía probably thinks he is dead.

Lorenzo guesses Lucía is on the island and has the editor take him there. After both women discover that Lorenzo isn't dead, the three characters cope with and finally understand the entanglements of their interwoven relationships.

== Cast ==
- Paz Vega as Lucía
- Tristán Ulloa as Lorenzo
- Najwa Nimri as Elena
- Daniel Freire as Carlos / Antonio
- Elena Anaya as Belén
- Silvia Llanos as Luna
- Javier Cámara as Pepe
- Diana Suárez as Madre de Belén
- Juan Fernández as Jefe
- María Álvarez as Nurse
- Alesandra Álvarez (Luna age 1)
- David Bulnes (porn actor)

== Production ==
The film was produced by Sogecine, the production arm of Sogecable. Shooting locations included Fuerteventura and Madrid.

The Cap de Barbaria Lighthouse on Formentera was a pivotal filming location for the film, and served as the touchstone for the various characters' interwoven relationships.

== Reception ==
=== Critical response ===
Review aggregator Rotten Tomatoes gives the film an approval rating of 71% based on 70 reviews, with a weighted average of 6.5/10. The site's consensus states: "Beneath the gratuitous nudity lies a complex and visually striking movie." Metacritic, which uses an average of 28 critics' reviews, gives the film a 65 out of 100 rating, indicating "generally favorable reviews".

=== Accolades ===
| Year | Award | Category | Nominee(s) | Result | Ref. |
|---|---|---|---|---|---|
| 2002 | 16th Goya Awards | Best Film | | Nominated | |
| 2002 | 16th Goya Awards | Best Director | Julio Medem | Nominated | |
| 2002 | 16th Goya Awards | Best Original Screenplay | Julio Medem | Nominated | |
| 2002 | 16th Goya Awards | Best Actor | Tristán Ulloa | Nominated | |
| 2002 | 16th Goya Awards | Best Supporting Actress | Najwa Nimri | Nominated | |
| 2002 | 16th Goya Awards | Best Supporting Actress | Elena Anaya | Nominated | |
| 2002 | 16th Goya Awards | Best New Actress | Paz Vega | Won | |
| 2002 | 16th Goya Awards | Best Original Score | Alberto Iglesias | Won | |
| 2002 | 16th Goya Awards | Best Cinematography | Kiko de la Rica | Nominated | |
| 2002 | 16th Goya Awards | Best Editing | Iván Aledo | Nominated | |
| 2002 | 16th Goya Awards | Best Sound | Agustín Peinado, Alfonso Pino, Santiago Thevenet, Polo Aledo | Nominated | |
| 2002 | 11th Actors Union Awards | Best Film Performance in a Leading Role | Paz Vega | Nominated | |
| 2002 | 11th Actors Union Awards | Best Film Performance in a Secondary Role | Elena Anaya | Won | |
| 2002 | 11th Actors Union Awards | Best Film Performance in a Secondary Role | Najwa Nimri | Nominated | |
| 2002 | 11th Actors Union Awards | Best Film Performance in a Minor Role | Javier Cámara | Nominated | |

== See also ==
- List of Spanish films of 2001

== Bibliography ==
- Stone, Rob (2007). Spanish and Latin American Filmmakers: Julio Medem. Manchester and New York: Manchester University Press. ISBN 978-0-7190-7200-0.
