= Sergi López (actor) =

Spanish actor (born 1965)

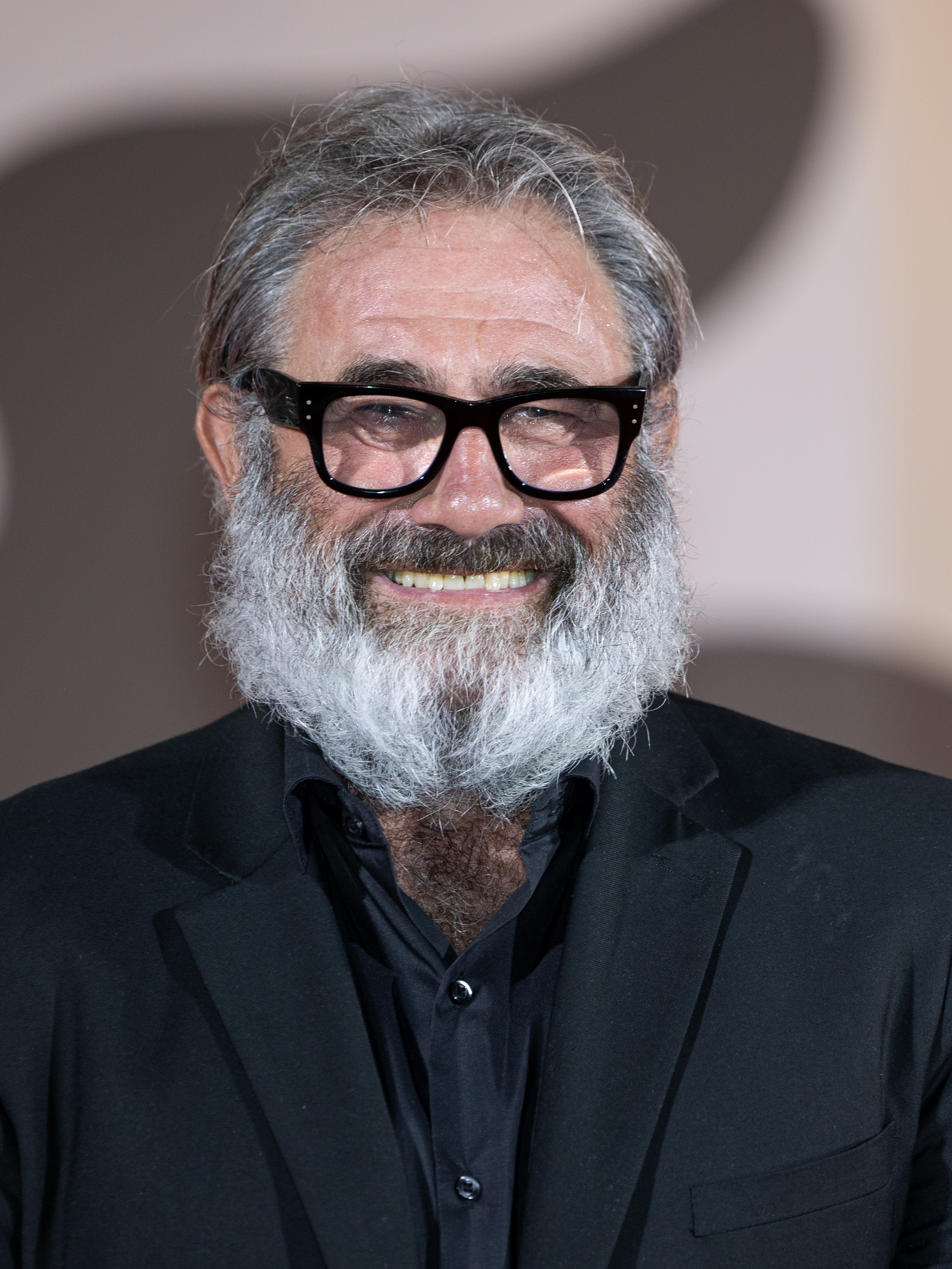
- López in 2024
- Born: Sergi López i Ayats; 22 December 1965 (age 60); Vilanova i la Geltrú, Catalonia, Spain
- Education: École Internationale de Théâtre Jacques Lecoq
- Occupation: Actor
- Years active: 1990s–present

Sergi López i Ayats (born 22 December 1965) is a Spanish actor mostly known for his work on Dirty Pretty Things, Mine Alone, and Pan's Labyrinth. He has developed a substantial career in both Spanish films and French films and is the recipient of multiple accolades, including a César Award for Best Actor and a European Film Award.

== Early life and education ==
Sergi López was initiated in theater in representations of typical nativity plays called Els Pastorets, in his native city. He started to study theater in Barcelona. During his time as a stage actor, Sergi López participated in several theatrical productions. For example, he shared the stage with Toni Albà in plays such as BRAMS or La Kumèdia dels Herrors (1986), both written and directed by the duo. Other notable plays from this period include Fins al fons and, later, Lysistrata (1996).

He later continued his acting training at the prestigious École Internationale de Théâtre Jacques Lecoq in Paris, where he studied physical theatre and mime. This training helped shape his expressive performance style, which has become a hallmark of his acting. His fluency in Catalan, French, and Spanish gave him access to diverse theatrical and cinematic productions across Europe.

== Career ==
In 1991, he auditioned for French director Manuel Poirier. López made his film debut that year in Poirier's La Petite amie d'Antonio (1992). López did eight more films with Poirier, including his first international success, Western (1997).The film was entered into the 1997 Cannes Film Festival where it won the Jury Prize, and was submitted for an Oscar; López himself was nominated for the César Award. In 2000, he won the Cesar for Best Actor for his role in the French film Harry, un ami qui vous veut du bien.

In 1997, he starred in Caresses, directed by fellow Catalan Ventura Pons. His resume includes films such as Dirty Pretty Things, Solo mía, and Pan's Labyrinth.

In 2005, he returned to the stage to perform a monologue in Non solum, which he wrote and directed with Jorge Picó.

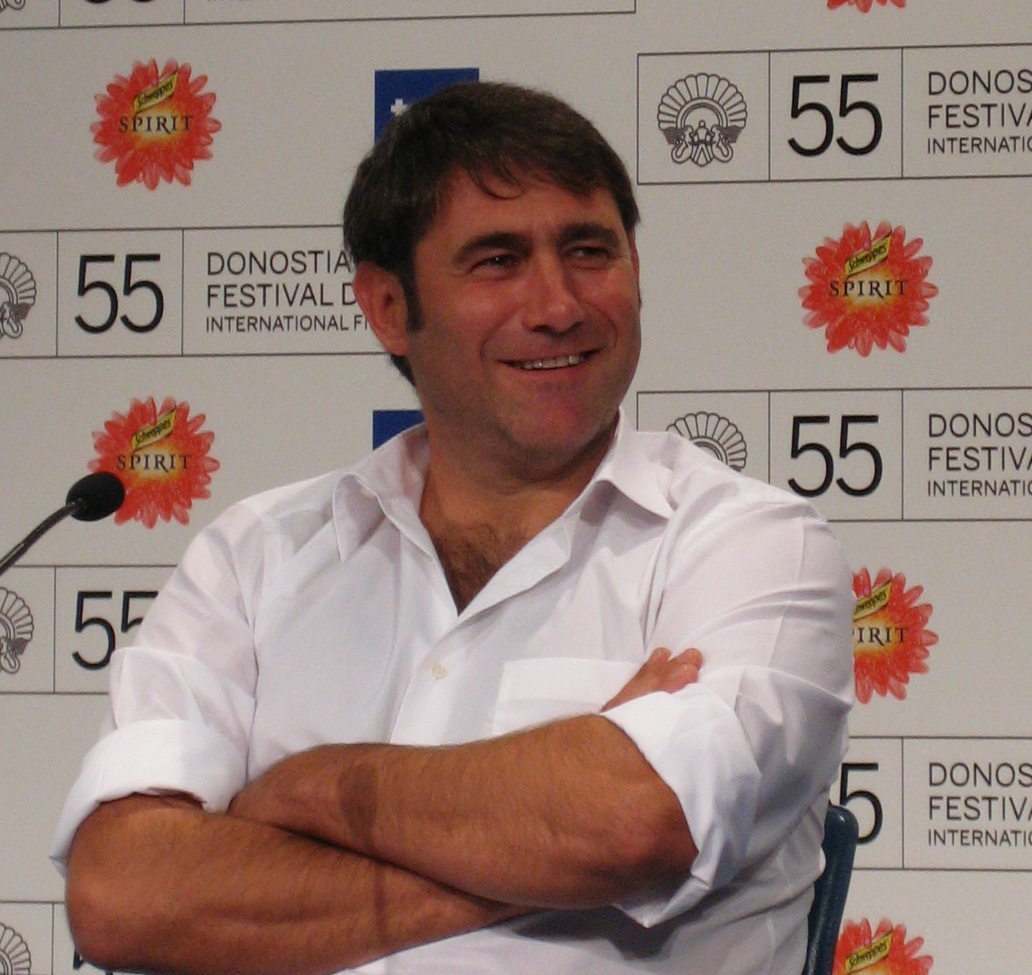
López during the presentation of La maison at the 55th San Sebastián International Film Festival in 2007.

After 2005, Sergi López expanded his film career with a variety of roles across European cinema. In 2006, he gained international recognition playing Captain Vidal in Guillermo del Toro’s critically acclaimed Pan's Labyrinth. He continued collaborating with prominent directors such as François Ozon in Ricky (2009) and Potiche (2010). Between 2009 and 2012, López appeared in several notable films including Leaving (2009), Isabel Coixet’s Map of the Sounds of Tokyo (2009), and Dominik Moll’s The Monk (2011). He also took roles in the French cinema landscape, such as Tango libre (2012) and Michael Kohlhaas (2013).

In 2014 and 2015, López starred in films like High Society, Geronimo, and A Perfect Day, demonstrating his versatility across genres. His recent collaborations include appearances in Alice Rohrwacher’s Happy as Lazzaro (2018) and Terry Gilliam’s The Man Who Killed Don Quixote (2018).

In 2020, he featured in Woody Allen’s Rifkin's Festival. Looking forward, López has filmed roles in upcoming projects such as Fabrice Du Welz’s Maldoror (2024) and two 2025 films: La terra negra, portraying Miquel, and Sirāt, playing Luis.

Throughout his career, López's multilingual skills and strong background in physical theatre have enabled him to navigate seamlessly between the Spanish and French film industries, earning him critical acclaim and numerous awards.

He was awarded the ‘Itinérances’ prize in 2025 by the Alès Film Festival – Itinérances.

== Selected filmography ==
| Year | Title | Role | Director |
|---|---|---|---|
| 1995 | ...à la campagne | Pablo | Manuel Poirier |
| 1997 | Caresses | Home | Ventura Pons |
| 1997 | Western | Paco Cazale | Manuel Poirier |
| 1999 | Between Your Legs | Claudio | Manuel Gomez Pereira |
| 1999 | An Affair of Love | Him | Frédéric Fonteyne |
| 1999 | Empty Days | Luis | Marion Vernoux |
| 1999 | Lisbon | João | Antonio Hernández |
| 2000 | Harry, He's Here to Help | Harry | Dominik Moll |
| 2001 | Ten Days Without Love | Miguel | Miguel Albaladejo |
| 2001 | Jet Lag | Sergio | Danièle Thompson |
| 2001 | The Milk of Human Kindness | Serge | Dominique Cabrera |
| 2001 | Mine Alone | Joaquin | Javier Balaguer |
| 2001 | A Hell of a Day | Luis Del Sol | Marion Vernoux |
| 2002 | Filles perdues, cheveux gras | Philippe | Claude Duty |
| 2002 | Rencontre avec le dragon | Raoul de Ventadour | Hélène Angel |
| 2002 | Dirty Pretty Things | Sneaky / Juan | Stephen Frears |
| 2004 | Words in Blue | Vincent | Alain Corneau |
| 2004 | To Paint or Make Love | Adam | Arnaud Larrieu and Jean-Marie Larrieu |
| 2006 | Pan's Labyrinth | Captain Vidal | Guillermo del Toro |
| 2007 | Parc | Georges Clou | Arnaud des Pallières |
| 2009 | Ricky | Paco | François Ozon |
| 2009 | Happy End | Théo | Arnaud Larrieu and Jean-Marie Larrieu |
| 2009 | Leaving | Ivan | Catherine Corsini |
| 2009 | The Boat Race | Sergi | Bernard Bellefroid |
| 2009 | Map of the Sounds of Tokyo | David | Isabel Coixet |
| 2010 | Black Bread | The Mayor | Agustí Villaronga |
| 2010 | Potiche | The Spanish Trucker | François Ozon |
| 2011 | The Monk | The Silent Man | Dominik Moll |
| 2012 | La Proie | Manuel Carrega | Éric Valette |
| 2012 | Dream and Silence | Valenti | Jaime Rosales |
| 2012 | Tango libre | Fernand | Frédéric Fonteyne |
| 2013 | Michael Kohlhaas | One-Armed man | Arnaud des Pallières |
| 2013 | Turf | Delgado | Fabien Onteniente |
| 2014 | High Society | Harold | Julie Lopes-Curval |
| 2014 | Geronimo | Le père de Geronimo | Tony Gatlif |
| 2015 | A Perfect Day | Goyo | Fernando León de Aranoa |
| 2015 | 21 Nights with Pattie | Manuel | Arnaud Larrieu; Jean-Marie Larrieu |
| 2015 | Second Origin | The Man | Carles Porta |
| 2015 | Les Rois du monde | Jeannot | Laurent Laffargue |
| 2018 | Happy as Lazzaro | Ultimo | Alice Rohrwacher |
| 2018 | The Man Who Killed Don Quixote | The Farmer | Terry Gilliam |
| 2019 | La innocència | Catalano | Lucía Alemany |
| 2020 | La boda de Rosa | Armando | Icíar Bollaín |
| 2020 | Rifkin's Festival | Paco | Woody Allen |
| 2022 | Pacifiction | Morton | Albert Serra |
| 2024 | Maldoror | Marcel Dedieu | Fabrice Du Welz |
| 2025 | La terra negra | Miquel | Alberto Morais |
| 2025 | Sirāt | Luis | Oliver Laxe |

== Theater ==
- Brams o la kumèdia dels errors
- Fins al fons
- Lisistrata (1996)
- Non Solum (2005)

He has also acted in classical plays such as:

- Endgame by Samuel Beckett
- Waiting for Godot by Samuel Beckett

López has collaborated with prestigious theatre companies like Théâtre de la Ville in Paris and Comédie-Française.

In 2010, he won the Premio Max for Best Actor for his theatre work.

He has also directed minimalist stage productions focusing on expressive movement.

López continues to alternate regularly between stage and screen performances.

== Social and political activism ==
Sergi López has consistently shown a strong commitment to social and political causes, especially advocating for the Catalan language and independence.

He participated in anti-fascist and anti-racist movements and supported solidarity for refugees. In 2006, he also publicly supported the Sahrawi cause, reading a manifesto in Vilafranca del Penedès.

Since the early 2000s, López has been an outspoken defender of Catalan independence from a left-wing perspective. In November 2009 he publicly supported independence referendums in Catalan municipalities. He later appeared as a symbolic candidate on the CUP list for his hometown’s municipal elections.

On 6 November 2012, López published a political essay titled *Esquerra? La CUP*, endorsing the CUP-Alternativa d'Esquerres in the Catalan parliamentary elections.

He was again listed symbolically on the CUP–Crida Constituent ticket in the 2015 Catalan parliamentary election. In 2017, he supported the 1 October referendum and voted in his hometown.

He is also a vocal supporter of the Catalan language. In September 2023, he joined prominent figures such as Pep Guardiola and Josep Carreras in signing a manifesto calling for Catalan to be an official language of the European Union.
