= Kiko de la Rica =

Spanish cinematographer (born 1965)

- Born: 6 April 1965 (age 61); Bilbao, Spain
- Occupation: Cinematographer
- Years active: 1989-present

Kiko de la Rica (born 6 April 1965) is a Spanish cinematographer. He contributed to more than forty films including Sex and Lucia and The Last Circus.

== Career ==
De la Rica won the Best Cinematography award for Torremolinos 73 at the Cinespaña Festival in Toulouse. He received nominations for the Goya Award for Best Cinematography for Common Wealth, Sex and Lucia, The Last Circus, and Witching & Bitching, and won the award for Blancanieves in 2013. He also received the Golden Camera 300 award at the Manaki Brothers Film Festival in 2013 for Blancanieves.

== Filmography ==
- El reino de Víctor (1989) Short
- Mirindas asesinas (1991) Short
- Ana y los Davis (1994) Short
- Malditas sean las suegras(1994) Short
- Salto al vacío (1995)
- Adiós Toby, adiós (1995) Short
- Pasajes (1996)
- Marisma (1997) Short
- Sólo se muere dos veces (1997)
- Muerto de amor (1997) Short
- Entre todas las mujeres (1998)
- Pecata minuta (1998)
- Ordinary Americans: Americanos cotidianos (1999) Short
- Carretera y manta (2000)
- Common Wealth (2000)
- Sabotage! (2000)
- Sex and Lucia (2001)
- Killer Housewives (2001)
- Torremolinos 73 (2003)
- Chill Out! (2003)
- Football Days (2003)
- Lo mejor que le puede pasar a un cruasán (2003)
- Torapia (2004)
- El Calentito (2005)
- Días de cine (2007)
- Guantanamero (2007)
- Mataharis (2007)
- The Oxford Murders (2008)
- 14, Fabian Road (2008)
- Return to Hansala (2008)
- Born to Suffer (2009)
- Parenthesis (Short) (2009)
- The Last Circus (2010)
- As Luck Would Have It (2011)
- Blancanieves (2012)
- Witching & Bitching (2013)
- La vida inesperada (2013)
- Luz con Maestros (2013)
- Words with Gods (2014) (segment "The Confession")
- Messi (2014)
- Francis: Pray for Me (2015)
- Ma ma (2015)
- Kiki, Love to Love (2016)
- Un beso de película (2017) Short
- Abracadabra (2017)
- El pelotari y la fallera (2017) Short
- Sin rodeos (2018)
- El árbol de la sangre (2018)
