= Intacto =

2001 film by Juan Carlos Fresnadillo

- English: Intact
- Directed by: Juan Carlos Fresnadillo
- Written by: Juan Carlos Fresnadillo; Andrés M. Koppel
- Starring: Leonardo Sbaraglia; Eusebio Poncela; Mónica López; Antonio Dechent; Max von Sydow
- Cinematography: Xavi Giménez
- Edited by: Nacho Ruiz Capillas
- Music by: Lucio Godoy
- Production companies: Sogecine; Telecinco
- Distributed by: Warner Sogefilms
- Release date: November 9, 2001
- Running time: 108 minutes
- Country: Spain
- Language: Spanish

Intacto (English: Intact) is a 2001 Spanish thriller film directed and co-written by Juan Carlos Fresnadillo and starring Leonardo Sbaraglia, Eusebio Poncela, Mónica López, Antonio Dechent, and Max von Sydow. It was first released in Spain during November, 2001, and then internationally on the film festival circuit in 2002.

Rooted in magical realism, the film depicts an underground trade in luck, where fortune flows from those who have less to those who have more; the premise purports that luck can be amassed and transferred as any other commodity. The story follows several participants as they engage in literal games of chance, each one more risky than the last, to eliminate the unlucky.

== Plot ==
A concentration camp survivor named Samuel "Sam" Berg (Max von Sydow), a supernaturally lucky man, runs a European casino. One of his workers is Federico (Eusebio Poncela), a man who "steals" other people's luck merely by laying a hand on them.

When Sam has a falling out with Federico and takes away his powers, Federico sets out to find the luckiest man alive, Tomás (Leonardo Sbaraglia), the lone survivor of a plane crash, in order to use his powers to overpower Sam in the one game he has never lost: Russian roulette.

Federico takes his partner through a series of tests in order to confirm his abilities. In the process, they approach the tightening circle of underground chance games that will eventually lead them both, and a female cop on their heels, to a final showdown with Sam.

== Cast ==
- Leonardo Sbaraglia as Tomás
- Eusebio Poncela as Federico
- Mónica López as Sara
- Antonio Dechent as Alejandro
- Max von Sydow as Sam

== Reception ==
On the review aggregator website Rotten Tomatoes, 73% of 71 critics' reviews are positive, with an average rating of 6.5/10. The website's consensus reads: "The plot gimmick is original, bolstered by stylishly intriguing setpieces." Metacritic, which uses a weighted average, assigned the film a score of 59 out of 100, based on 25 critics, indicating "mixed or average" reviews.

== See also ==
- 13 Tzameti
- Luck (2009 film)
- List of Spanish films of 2001
