= Off Key (2001 film) =

2001 film by Manuel Gómez Pereira

- Spanish: Desafinado
- Directed by: Manuel Gómez Pereira
- Written by: Yolanda García Serrano; Manuel Gómez Pereira; Juan Luis Iborra; Joaquín Oristrell
- Produced by: Andrés Vicente Gómez
- Starring: Joe Mantegna; Danny Aiello; George Hamilton; Anna Galiena
- Cinematography: Juan Amorós
- Edited by: José Salcedo
- Music by: Bernardo Bonezzi
- Release date: November 16, 2001 (Spain)
- Running time: 118 minutes
- Countries: Spain; United Kingdom; Italy
- Language: English

Off Key (also known as Desafinado) is a 2001 Spanish-British-Italian comedy film written and directed by Manuel Gómez Pereira. In it Joe Mantegna, Danny Aiello, and George Hamilton star as three celebrity tenors. Although they perform and have some good times together, they are rivals onstage and in their private lives. They also undergo intense scrutiny from the paparazzi and gossip press over their love lives and careers. The film was loosely inspired by the real life Three Tenors, Plácido Domingo, Luciano Pavarotti, and José Carreras.

== Plot ==
The movie opens with a shot of a poster with three men in tuxedos under the name "Los Tres Tenores". Inside a theater in Mexico, one of the men, the dapper and refined French tenor Armand Dupres sings an operatic aria. Backstage, Spanish tenor Ricardo Palacios' wife tries to shoot him in the groin for cheating on her. Police take her away screaming, as Palacios and superstitious Italian tenor, Fabrizio Bernini, prepare to go onstage. Palacios hands his colleagues large Mexican sombreros and tells them to their disgust they must sing a mariachi number together. The concert turns into a disaster. A series of newspaper headlines follow their performance asking "Tenors or Clowns?" and explaining that his singing partners are suing Palacios for fraud. Paparazzi photographs follow showing Bernini kissing Palacios' wife and Dupres mourning his own wife's death.

The action shifts ten years forward as Dupres is preparing to marry Palacios' daughter. The Frenchman's butler is horrified and tries to sabotage the union. Bernini has also married Palacios' now ex-wife. The Italian tenor does not want to attend Dupres' wedding, but his wife wants to be there for her daughter. She chides him about his insecurity, as he questions her whether Palacios was a better lover. Palacios also plans to attend his daughter's wedding at Dupres' French villa, but he has additional schemes in mind. He hires a call girl to pose as his fiancée to convince his former partners and ex-wife how well he is now doing. While learning facts about his life (e.g. he was born on a boat to Mexico), the call girl tries to seduce him but he refuses, saying that sex has gotten him into trouble in the past. Immediately, an irate chef confronts the tenor about sleeping with his daughter, who he insists now has twins who sing constantly.

On the way to Dupres' villa, Bernini feels ill because of his phobia of air conditioning and germs. At the villa, his wife and Dupres are briefly alone together. She threatens to tell her daughter and he threatens to tell her husband that they too were once lovers. Dupres and Bernini speculate over why Palacios is really attending the wedding. Dupres suggests that the Spaniard is more concerned with money than anything else. Once he arrives, Palacios tells his former colleagues that he has discovered "the new Three Tenors", in a bid to get them to return to performing together instead. Later, while his wife is painting his greying eyebrows dark, Bernini theatrically exclaims that everyone wants to replace him. She chides him for thinking the world revolves around himself.

The following day, after Palacios sings a tango, the tenors have an argument. Dupres and Bernini express disgust that Palacios got them to record duets with pop singers, dress as mariachis, and promote Pizza Hut and the World Cup, when what they do is art. Palacios avers that repeating the same compositions over and over for rich people is not art. It is more important to him that 1.5 billion people watched them perform on television.

Later that day, Palacios hears a new composition by Dupres' son performed by three singing waiters. Telling the son that he has conducted modern music like his, he convinces them to perform the composition at a party on the eve of Dupres' wedding, claiming to his former partners that these were his three young discoveries. Once they hear them sing, the older tenors begin to sing together too. After the party, Bernini unsuccessfully tries to kill himself, despairing over his thirty-year rivalry with Palacios, while Dupres' fiancée realizes she is actually in love with his son. The next day at the wedding Palacios, after bragging about his acting abilities in Otello, pretends to have a heart attack in order to distract the paparazzi while his daughter and Dupres' son run away together. Soon afterwards, Bernini sings "Nessun Dorma" at a Spanish opera house, while a poster with the title "The 3 Tenors the Return" is seen. Palacios comes out of his dressing room after a tryst with the call girl, and the three tenors go onstage to sing and dance the "Macarena".

== Cast ==
- Joe Mantegna as Ricardo Palacios
- Danny Aiello as Fabrizio Bernini
- George Hamilton as Armand Dupres
- Anna Galiena as Rita
- Ariadna Gil as Carmen Palacios
- Claudia Gerini as Violeta
- Ashley Hamilton as Maurice Dupres
- Geoffrey Bateman as Ivo
- Tiffany Hofstetter as Norma
- Vaughan Sivell as Flavio
- Manuel de Blas as Jean François
- René Assa as Sigmund Santini
- Jacques Herlin as Cardenal

== Background ==
Around a decade before Off Key was filmed, the most famous operatic tenors in the world, Luciano Pavarotti, Plácido Domingo, and José Carreras, appeared together in their first concert, the recording of which became the best-selling classical album of all time. More concerts, recordings, and a frenzy of publicity followed, including from the paparazzi and gossip books like The Private Lives of the Three Tenors. Variety discussed this background for the movie: "Inspiration is the well-documented squabbling and ego trips of the Pavarotti/Domingo/Carreras roadshow." The film's director, however, did not intend the movie to be an actual portrayal of the real-life singers. "My film has nothing to do with the lives of the real Three Tenors," Gómez Pereira said in an interview. "But if the Three Tenors did not exist, I would not have made this film." La Vanguardia explained that the movie was much more broadly about art as a business, in addition to a portrayal of the vanities of opera singers.

When asked whether the production encountered any problems from the real Three Tenors, the film's producer, Andrés Vicente Gómez, told the press that Carreras' lawyer had contacted them at the start of the project. However, upon learning that the movie would not be based on anyone's life, he never called them again. When asked why the character loosely inspired by Carreras was French instead of a Catalan from Spain, the producer joked that the change in nationality was "something to spare us from a trial." La Voz de Galicia viewed the project as promising based on its subject matter: "If the personal and professional relationships of Domingo, Pavarotti, and Carreras have provided much to talk about, those of this fictional trio additionally promise a continuous laugh."

== Characters ==
The stars of the movie verified that Off Key was not intended as an accurate biographical portrayal and expanded on their fictional characters to the press. Like the director Gómez Pereira, Danny Aiello (Bernini in the film) insisted: "The parallelisms with the Three Tenors are inevitable, but our intention is not to interpret Pavarotti, Carreras, or Domingo...Any resemblance to reality is pure coincidence." Aiello also joked to the press that he did not have time to eat enough pasta to be as big as the real Pavarotti. About Bernini he explained: "It's a crazy character, which gives me liberty to do many crazy things. He's unpredictable, Neapolitan, jealous, sophisticated." Aiello added, "This is a film that speaks of love, hate, jealousies, friendship". He claimed that script was one of the funniest things he had read in fifteen years.

George Hamilton, who played Dupres, noted: "It's a film about egos, styles, and eccentricities of three great singers, but we do not want to imitate anyone." He also suggested that these sorts of jealousies were common among actors too. According to Hamilton, Dupres is impeccable almost to the point of being kitsch and is always pursuing youth. He expressed pride in working with his real son, Ashley Hamilton, who played his son in the movie. He also explained that a special chemistry existed between Aiello, Mantegna, and himself and expressed the hope that the movie would help him to be better known in Europe.

In a scene apparently later excised Joe Mantegna sang as Palacios in the movie. He explained to the press that his singing was, however, "more in the style of Dean Martin than Plácido Domingo". About the movie he added: "I think that the real divos and their fans are going to like it, once they understand that it is not a documentary. They will be the ones who understand it best." The actor also praised the film for making him laugh. One of the movie's screenwriters explained that he viewed the character of Palacios as someone who is extroverted and commercial-minded, while Dupres is more interior oriented and Bernini is quirky and superstitious.

== Music ==
Three major operatic numbers are included in the movie. As the film starts, Dupres sings the "Flower Song" ("La fleur que tu m'avais jetée") from Bizet's opera, Carmen. In the aria, the character Don José tries to convince the wild Gypsy Carmen (also the name of Palacios' daughter in the movie) of the depth of his love for her. José Carreras recorded the complete role under the renowned conductor Herbert von Karajan in 1983, while Plácido Domingo starred in a movie version of the opera in 1984.

Later at the wedding party, the tenors sing the "Brindisi" ("Libiamo ne' lieti calici") from Verdi's La Traviata with Palacios' young discoveries. In the opera, the "Brinidisi" is also a toast sung at a party. The real Three Tenors, who always wore tuxedos in their joint concerts like their movie counterparts, performed this duet together as a trio many times. In 1994, they released a single of it that charted in Britain. The single came from their Three Tenors in Concert 1994 live recording from Dodger Stadium in Los Angeles during the World Cup. The concert was watched on television by 1.3 billion people worldwide.

The aria that Bernini sings near the end of the film, "Nessun Dorma" from Puccini's Turandot, became Luciano Pavarotti's best-known song and reached the second spot on the British charts in 1990. He popularized the aria, which soon became a football anthem and regularly recorded by pop stars, in addition to classical singers. In the film, Palacios also briefly mentions the Verdi opera, Otello, Plácido Domingo's signature role for almost three decades. For the movie, Spanish tenors Manuel de Diego and José Ferrero sang Palacios' and Dupres' numbers, respectively. Slovenian tenor Janez Lotrič performed Bernini's singing parts.

The mariachi song, "Guadalajara", that brings the downfall of the tenors in the film, has been a lasting classic of the genre, sung by performers as diverse as Vicente Fernandez and Elvis Presley. Neither the Three Tenors, nor Domingo alone has recorded the song, although the Spanish tenor (who grew up in Mexico) has performed it live in a full mariachi outfit with sombrero. The year prior to the movie's release, Domingo won a Grammy for his recording of mariachi rancheras, 100 Años de Mariachi. In 1981, he released an album of tangos, Plácido Domingo Sings Tangos, which included Carlos Gardel's classic, "El día que me quieres", which Palacios sings in the film. Domingo, who also conducts, periodically accompanies himself on the piano while singing, as does Palacios with this song. The movie also features an original piece written by Bernardo Bonezzi, which acts as Dupres' son's composition during the party scene.

== Reception ==
The reviewer for Variety was unimpressed by the movie's screwball comedy script and likened it to a series of underwhelming English-language films made by Spanish moviemakers. He believed that the frenetic pace of the story cost the movie any depth of characterization. "Despite thesps' histrionics," the reviewer wrote, "characters rarely escape stereotype, whether it be Mantegna's frenzied Spanish gesturing—though his accent sounds more Italian—Hamilton sleepwalking through Dupres, or [the call girl] Violeta's desire to get rich quick." The Spanish Fotogramas reviewer was more positive, comparing the film to elegant cinematic comedies of the 1950s. He praised the photography, gags, and the elegance of the director's staging, although he also noted that the movie was not a very refined comedy of entanglements.

The film had a budget of $8.5 million, making it the most expensive Spanish production to that point. Actors' fees accounted for a significant portion of the budget. It had been pre-sold to thirty-two countries prior to its release. Although it received good advertising, its November 2001 opening in Spain was disappointing. It was released the following month in Italy and in 2002 in the United Kingdom and United States.
