= Leaving (2009 film) =

- Directed by: Catherine Corsini
- Written by: Catherine Corsini; Gaelle Mace
- Produced by: Stéphane Parthenay; Michel Seydoux; Fabienne Vonier
- Starring: Sergi López; Kristin Scott Thomas; Yvan Attal
- Cinematography: Agnès Godard
- Edited by: Simon Jacquet
- Distributed by: Pyramide Distribution
- Release date: 12 August 2009 (France)
- Running time: 85 minutes
- Country: France
- Language: French

Leaving (French: Partir) is a 2009 French film directed by Catherine Corsini, written by Corsini and Gaeelle Mace, and starring Sergi López, Kristin Scott Thomas and Yvan Attal.

== Plot ==
Suzanne (Kristin Scott Thomas), is a well-to-do married woman and mother of two in the south of France. Her idle bourgeois lifestyle begins to depress her, and she decides to go back to work as a physiotherapist. Her husband, Samuel (Yvan Attal), agrees to fix up a treatment room for her in their back yard. When Suzanne meets Ivan (Sergi López), a Spanish ex-con hired to do the building, their mutual attraction is sudden and violent.

After multiple trysts with Ivan, Suzanne confesses the affair to her husband and promises to give it up, but finds she cannot. She finally decides to give up everything and live to the fullest her all-engulfing passion for Ivan, but her husband will not let go of her and her daughter rejects her, although her son stays connected to her. The new couple soon faces severe financial problems, some of them caused by Samuel: when Suzanne's credit card is rejected, she is forced to sell her Cartier watch at a gas station. In their extreme need, Suzanne and Ivan rob Samuel's house of its paintings and valuables but Ivan is arrested when he fences the stolen goods for them. Suzanne tries to convince her husband that she was solely responsible for the burglary, and that she only took what was hers. She offers to do anything to keep Ivan out of jail, and her husband tells her that, if she comes home, Ivan will be free. At this dilemma, she faints.

Back in their home, Suzanne is distant with her family, yet tolerant of her husband's sexual advances. Soon, though, she takes a rifle and shells from a closet and kills Samuel as he sleeps. After driving through the night, she is eventually reunited with Ivan at the ruined house in the hills they had once dreamt of restoring. They embrace and she sobs hysterically. In the distance, a police siren can be heard.

== Cast ==
- Kristin Scott Thomas as Suzanne
- Sergi López as Ivan
- Yvan Attal as Samuel
- Bernard Blancan as Rémi
- Aladin Reibel as Dubreuil
- Alexandre Vidal as David
- Daisy Broom as Marion
- Berta Esquirol as Berta
- Gérard Lartigau as Lagache
- Philippe Laudenbach as Samuel's father
- Geneviève Casile as Samuel's mother
- Michèle Ernou as Madame Aubouy

== Production ==
Filming took place in Nîmes.

== Reception ==
The film has been moderately well received by critics, and currently holds a rating of 69% on Rotten Tomatoes.
