= Roger Casamajor =

Catalan actor (born 1976)

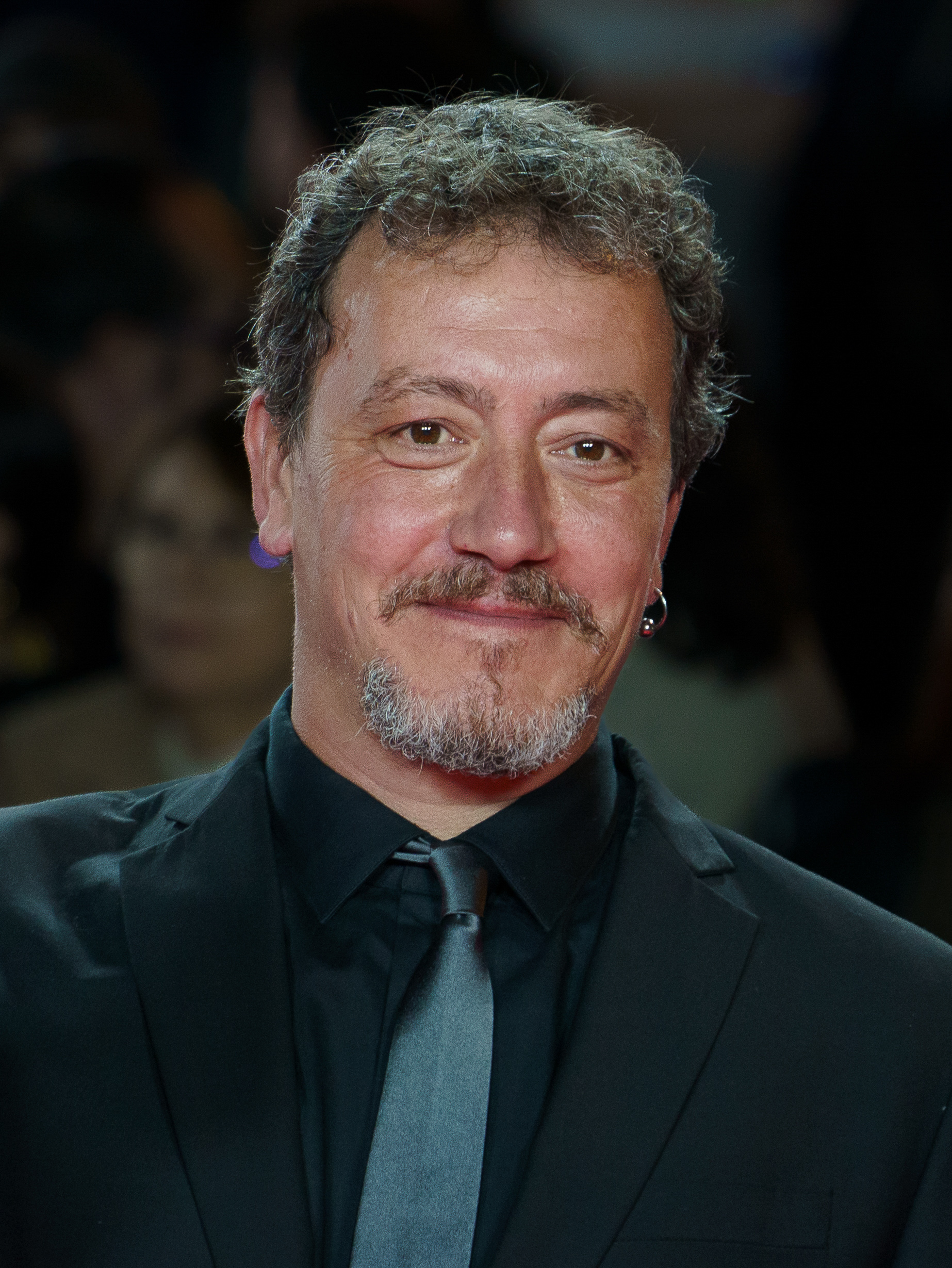
- Casamajor in 2025
- Born: Roger Casamajor Esteban; 17 December 1976 (age 49); La Seu d'Urgell, Spain
- Occupation: Actor

Roger Casamajor Esteban (born 17 December 1976) is a Spanish television, theater and film actor from Catalonia.

== Life ==
Roger Casamajor Esteban was born in 1976 in La Seu d'Urgell. He began his acting career in the theater in Andorra training as part of the company Somhiteatre and he traveled through Catalonia with a number of plays like The Shawl (David Mamet), A Respectable Wedding (Bertold Brecht), or Farses Medievals. He later moved to Barcelona to continue with acting studies in the Col.legi of Theatre and the Institut del Teatre.

He made his big screen debut in Agustí Villaronga's The Sea (2000). Subsequent films include The Dutchman's Island (2001), Savages (directed by Carlos Molinero, 2001), Warriors (Daniel Calparsoro, 2001), Summer's Clouds (Felipe Vega, 2004), Pan's Labyrinth (Guillermo del Toro, 2006) and Black Bread (Agustí Villaronga, 2010) for which he won the Gaudi Award as best supporting actor.

Casamajor has also appeared in Catalan television works such as Temps de silenci (2001), Angels sants (2006) and Fons Sea (2006–07). He has also done theater work in plays like The Tinent d'Inishmore and Carnival.

Casamajor's performance in Villaronga's The Belly of the Sea (2021), earned him the Silver Biznaga at the 24th Málaga Film Festival.

== Accolades ==
Year	Award	Category	Work	Result	Ref.
2011	3rd Gaudí Awards	Best Supporting Actor	Black Bread	Won	
2021	24th Málaga Film Festival	Silver Biznaga for Best Actor	The Belly of the Sea	Won	
2022	14th Gaudí Awards	Best Actor	The Belly of the Sea	Nominated	
2023	29th Forqué Awards	Best Actor in a Television Series	La mesías	Won	
2024	11th Feroz Awards	Best Main Actor in a Series	La mesías	Won	
