= Bernardo Bonezzi =

Spanish film music composer

Bernardo Silvano Bonezzi Nahón (6 July 1964 – 30 August 2012) was a Spanish film music composer and musician who was born in Madrid. He won a Cinema Writers Circle Award for Bendito infierno, and was nominated for three Goya Awards and won one for his work on Nadie hablará de nosotras cuando hayamos muerto. He was a frequent collaborator of Pedro Almodóvar on his early films, having composed for five, before being succeeded by Alberto Iglesias.

He began his career as a member of the 1980s teen group "Los Zombies". They are best known for the song "Groenlandia", which is perhaps Bonezzi's most famous composition.

On the fifth anniversary of his death, the song "Fade to Black" was released as a tribute to him. It was written and recorded by his long time friend, actress, and singer Tres Hanley.

Bonezzi was found dead in his home on 30 August 2012. It is reported that his last Facebook post to friends was “I'm fading to black”. Which is where the title of the song comes from. The music video for "Fade To Black" features clips from Bonezzi's home movies as well as clips with Los Zombies.

== Filmography ==
- Labyrinth of Passion (Laberinto de Pasiones) 1982
- What Have I Done to Deserve This? (¿Qué he hecho yo para merecer esto?) 1984
- Matador 1986
- Law of Desire (La Ley del Deseo) 1987
- Women on the Verge of a Nervous Breakdown (Mujeres al Borde de un Ataque de Nervios) 1988
- All Tied Up 1994
- Hi, Are You Alone? (Hola, ¿estás sola?) 1995
- Nobody Will Speak of Us When We're Dead Nadie hablará de nosotras cuando hayamos muerto) 1995
- Mouth to Mouth (Boca A Boca) 1995
- Love Can Seriously Damage Your Health (El amor perjudica seriamente la salud) 1997
- Don't Tempt Me (Bendito Infierno / Sin noticias de Dios in Spanish / No News From God) 2001
- Off Key (Desafinado) 2001
