= Paz Vega =

Spanish actress (born 1976)

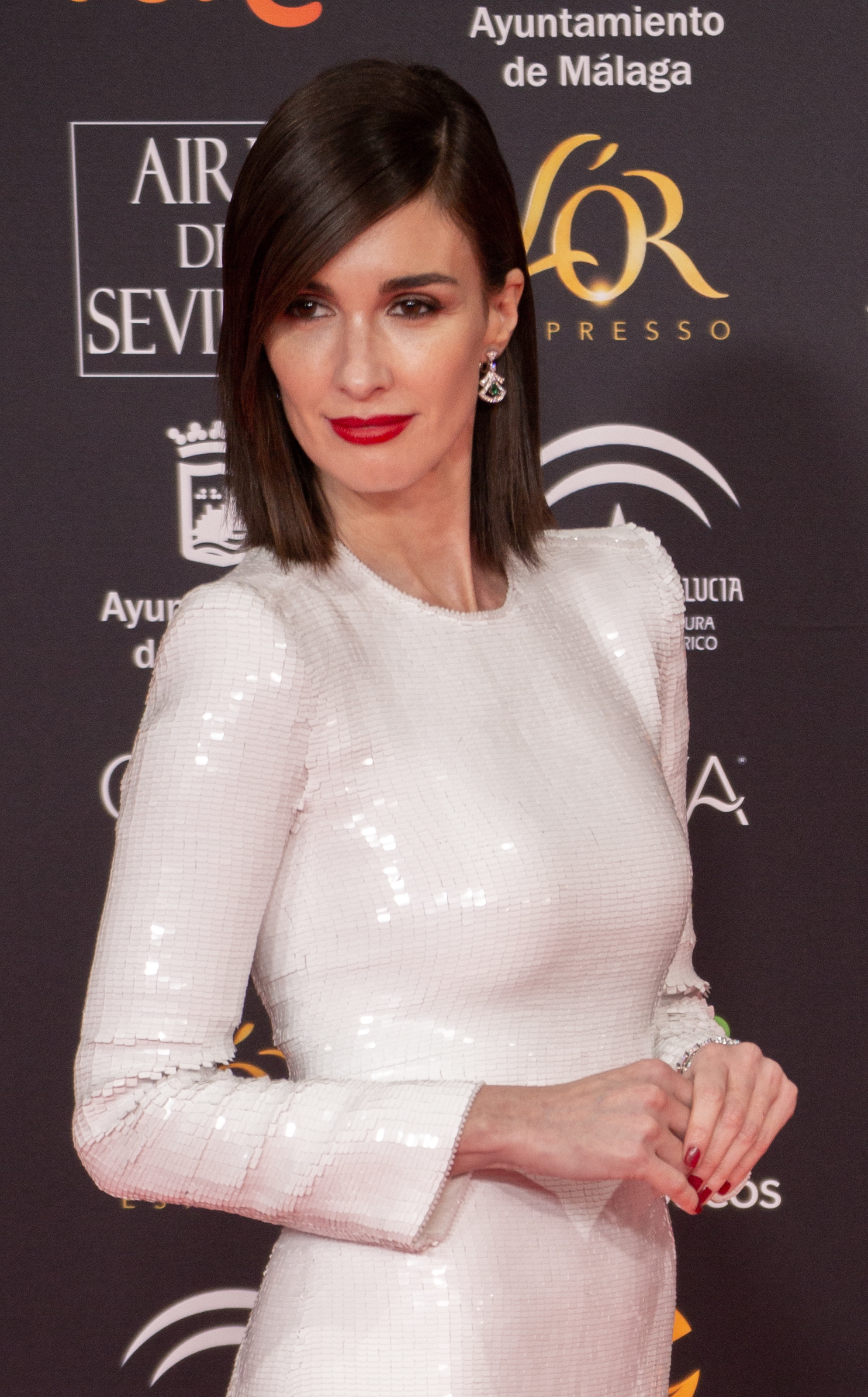
- Vega in 2020
- Born: María de la Paz Campos Trigo; 2 January 1976 (age 50); Seville, Spain
- Occupations: Actress; filmmaker
- Years active: 1997–present
- Spouse: Orson Salazar (m. 2002)
- Children: 3

María de la Paz Campos Trigo (born 2 January 1976), known professionally as Paz Vega (Spanish: [paθˈβeɣa]), is a Spanish actress. She became popular for her performance in comedy television series 7 vidas. Her film credits include Sex and Lucia (2001), Mine Alone (2001), The Other Side of the Bed (2002), Carmen (2003), Spanglish (2004), and Theresa: The Body of Christ (2007). She played the role of Catalina Creel in the 2019 television series Cradle of Wolves (Cuna de lobos). She made her directorial debut with Rita (2024), which she also wrote.

== Early life ==
Vega was born in Seville, Andalusia, in 1976 to a housewife mother and a father who was a former bullfighter. Vega's younger sister has performed as a flamenco dancer. Vega has described her family as "traditional" and Catholic. She took her stage surname of 'Vega' from her grandmother. Vega decided to become an actress after attending a performance of Federico García Lorca's play, Bernarda Alba's House (La casa de Bernarda Alba), when she was 16.

After completing compulsory education at 16, Vega was accepted at the Andalusian Theater Center (Centro Andaluz de Teatro) stage school. She studied there for two years and took another two years studying journalism. She next moved to Madrid to seek her future.

== Screen career ==
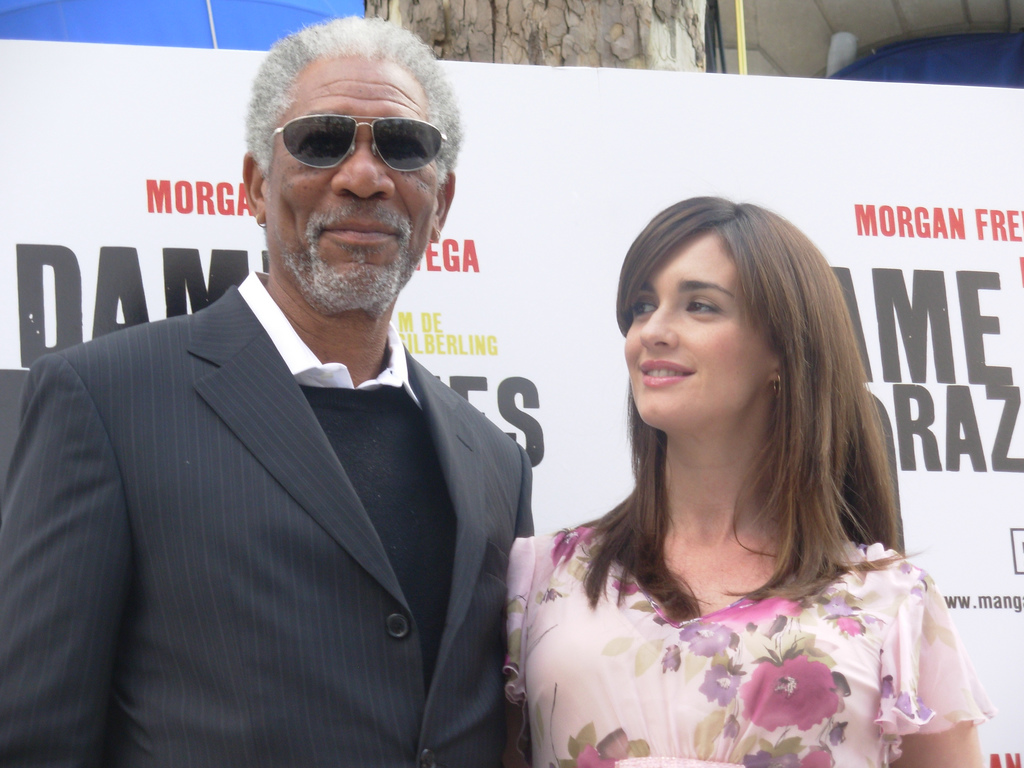
Vega at the 10 Items or Less premiere in Madrid with co-star Morgan Freeman in 2007

Vega made her television debut in the Spanish TV series, My Father Is So Nice (Menudo es mi padre), which starred rumba singer El Fary. She appeared in two other series in 1997; More Than Friends (Más que amigos) and Companions (Compañeros).

In 1999, she made her film debut in Zapping. The same year, she also had a minor role in the David Menkes movie I Will Survive, alongside Emma Suárez, and Juan Diego Botto.

Vega found success in 1999's TV series 7 Lives (7 Vidas). The series was billed as a Spanish Friends and became one of the country's best-loved domestic sitcoms. Vega played Laura, a perky Andalusian girl who had come to stay with David, who had recently come out of a coma. The series was broadcast on Telecinco and finished on 12 April 2006, albeit without Vega.

In 2001, she starred in Julio Médem's film Sex and Lucia, which brought her to the attention of a larger audience. She received prominent exposure, particularly to American audiences, when she appeared in the 2004 James L. Brooks American film Spanglish opposite Adam Sandler. In 2006, she co-starred with American actor Morgan Freeman in the independent film 10 Items or Less, directed by Brad Silberling. In 2008, she co-starred with Gabriel Macht, Samuel L. Jackson, and Scarlett Johansson in The Spirit. In 2011, Vega had a role in Michele Placido's film Vallanzasca – The Angels of Evil.

Vega also works as a model; she is signed to 1/One Management in New York City. In May 2011, Vega replaced Penélope Cruz as the face for L'Oreal Spain.

In 2018, she participated in the third season of the reality cooking show MasterChef Celebrity.

In 2019, Vega appeared in Televisa to portray the lead character Catalina Creel in the miniseries Cradle of Wolves (Cuna de Lobos), based on the 1986 original telenovela of the same title. The same year, she portrayed an independent Mexican reporter in Rambo: Last Blood, in which she co-starred with Sylvester Stallone.

In 2023, Vega announced in Cannes the beginning of filming of her directorial and writing debut, Rita, a feature film set in 1980s Seville billed by Vega as a "costumbrista and nostalgic" story. The film premiered at 2024 Locarno Film Festival and earned her a nomination for the Goya Award for Best New Director.

In 2025, another directorial effort by Vega, Ana no, based on the novel by Agustín Gómez-Arcos, was reported to be in development.

== Personal life ==
Vega and her Venezuelan husband, Orson Salazar, had their first child, a son, in May 2004. Their second child, a daughter, was born in July 2006. Their third child, another son, was born in August 2007. They married in 2002.

Paz Vega is listed amongst the major tax defaulters by the Spanish Tax Agency, owing €1.7 million in 2023 and €2.3 million in 2024.

== Filmography ==
=== Film ===
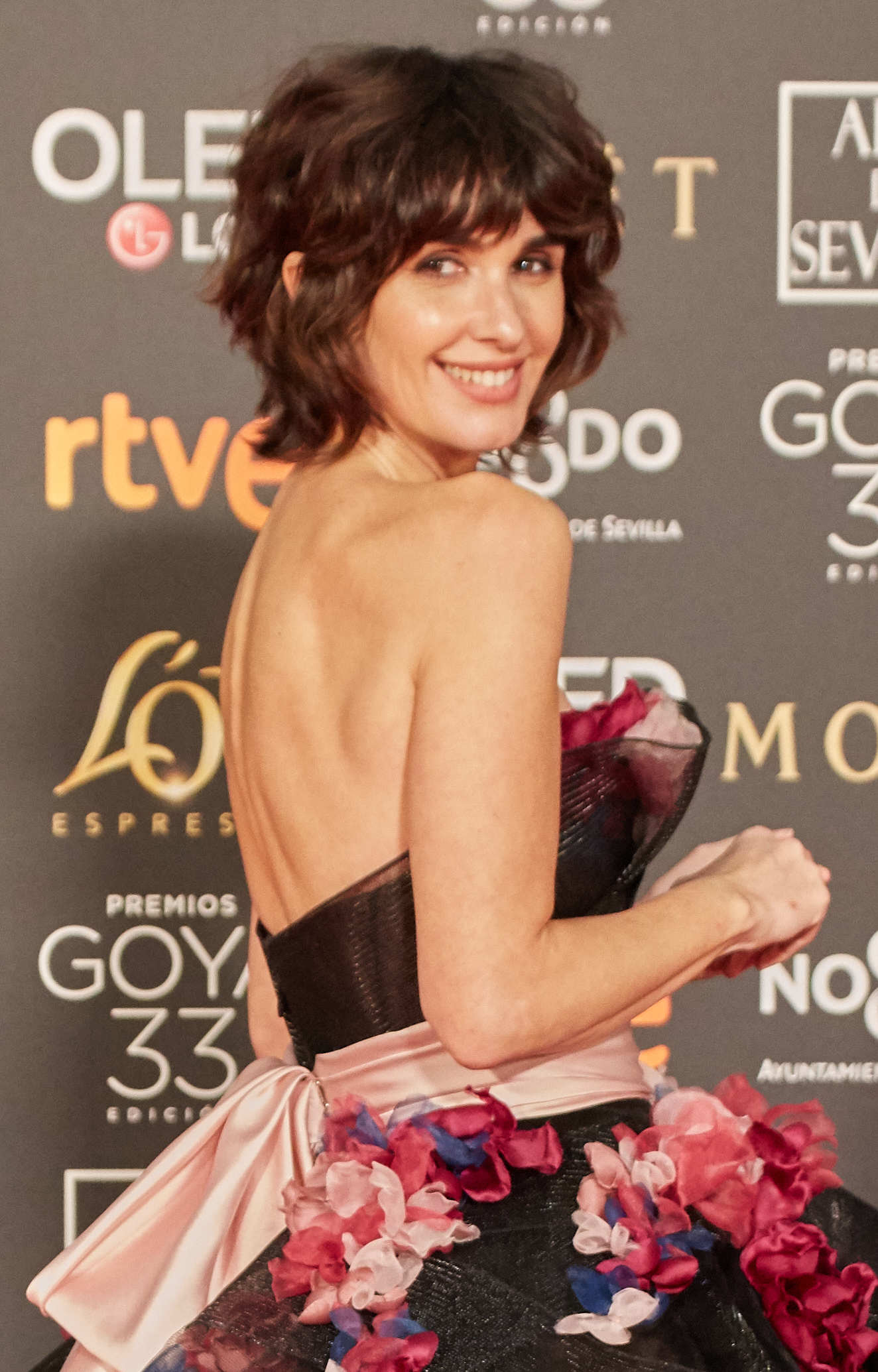
Vega at the 33rd Goya Awards in 2019

Year	Title	Roles	Notes	Ref.
1999	Zapping	Elvira	Feature film debut	
1999	I Will Survive (Sobreviviré)			
1999	Nobody Knows Anybody (Nadie conoce a nadie)	Ariadna		
2001	Sex and Lucia (Lucía y el sexo)	Lucía		
2001	Mine Alone (Sólo mía)	Ángela		
2002	Talk to Her (Hable con ella)	Amparo		
2002	The Other Side of the Bed (El otro lado de la cama)	Sonia		
2002	Novo	Isabelle		
2003	Carmen	Carmen		
2004	Say Yes (Di que sí)	Estrella Cuevas		
2004	Spanglish	Flor		
2006	10 Items or Less	Scarlet		
2006	The Borgia (Los Borgia)	Caterina Sforza		
2006	Fade to Black	Lea Padovani		
2007	The Lark Farm (La masseria delle allodole)	Nunik		
2007	Theresa: The Body of Christ (Teresa, el cuerpo de Cristo)	Santa Teresa		
2008	The Human Contract	Michael		
2008	The Spirit	Plaster of Paris		
2009	Not Forgotten	Amaya		
2009	The Six Wives of Henry Lefay	Verónica		
2009	Triage	Elena Morales		
2010	Burning Palms	Blanca Juárez		
2010	Angel of Evil	Antonella D'Agostino		
2011	Cat Run	Catalina Rona		
2012	Madagascar 3: Europe's Most Wanted	Esmeralda, Esperanza and Ernestina	Voice role	
2013	I'm So Excited! (Los amantes pasajeros)	Alba		
2013	Demon Inside	Marta		
2014	Grace of Monaco	Maria Callas		
2014	Paulo Coelho's Best Story	Luiza		
2014	Kill the Messenger	Coral Baca		
2014	The Ignorance of Blood (La ignorancia de la sangre)	Consuelo		
2015	All Roads Lead to Rome	Giulia Carni		
2016	Tales of an Immoral Couple (La vida inmoral de la pareja ideal)	Loles		
2017	Acts of Vengeance	Alma		
2018	The Bra (Vom Lokführer, der die Liebe suchte…, lit. About the Train Driver Who Was Looking for Love...)	Daria		
2019	Oh, my mother! (¡Ay, mi madre!	Pili		
2019	Rambo: Last Blood	Carmen Delgado		
2020	Chasing Wonders	Adrianna		
2021	American Night	Sarah		
2021	The House of Snails (La casa del caracol)	Berta		
2021	Wetland (El lodo)	Claudia		
2021	13 Minutes	Ana		
2022	There Are No Saints	Nadia		
2022	Full Train 2 (A todo tren 2)	Clara		
2024	Rita	Mari	Also director, writer, and executive producer	
2024	I Can't Live Without You (No puedo vivir sin ti)	Adela		
2025	Judas' Gospel	Mary		
2025	Fireflies at El Mozote	Alma	Complete	
TBD	Trinidad †	Claudia	Filming	
TBA	Perla †		Complete	
TBD	Pedro Pan †		Filming	

=== Television ===
Year	Title	Roles	Notes
1997	My Father Is So Nice (Menudo es mi padre	Olga	6 episodes
1997–1998	more Than Friends (Más que amigos	Olga	28 episodes
1998	Companions (Compañeros)	Luz	17 episodes
1999	Shelly Fisher	Seidy Bender	Television film
1999–2006	7 Lives (7 vidas)	Laura Arteagabeitia	60 episodes
2008	Lex	Rocío Janer	4 episodes
2012	Mary of Nazareth	Mary Magdalene	Television film
2012	One Thousand and One Nights: Aladdin and Sherazade (Le mille e una notte: Aladino e Sherazade)	Namuna	Miniseries, three parts
2015	Beautiful & Twisted	Narcy	Television film
2015	Big Time in Hollywood, FL	Isabella Delgado	4 episodes
2016–2017	The Brotherhood (La Hermandad)	Luisa Salinas	Main role (seasons 1–2); 25 episodes
2016–2019	The OA	Renata	Main role (seasons 1–2); 7 episodes
2017	Forgive me, sir (Perdóname, señor)	Lucía Medina	8 episodes
2018	Fugitive (Fugitiva)	Magda	9 episodes
2018	Paquita Salas	Herself	Episode: "Starting Point" ("Punto de partida")
2018	MasterChef Celebrity	Herself	Runner-Up (season 3); 11 episodes
2018	The Continental (El Continental)	Belice	5 episodes
2019	Cradle Of Wolves (Cuna de lobos)	Catalina Creel de Larios	Lead role
2020	The House of Flowers (La Casa de las Flores)	Carmelita's mother	Episode: "LAUREL, (Symb. glory)"
2020–2021	Mask Singer: Guess Who Sings (Mask Singer: Adivina quién canta)	Catrina	Winner (season 1); 8 episodes
2020–2021	Mask Singer: Guess Who Sings (Mask Singer: Adivina quién canta)	Herself	Investigator (season 2); 9 episodes
2023	Kaleidoscope	Ava Mercer	Main role

== Accolades ==
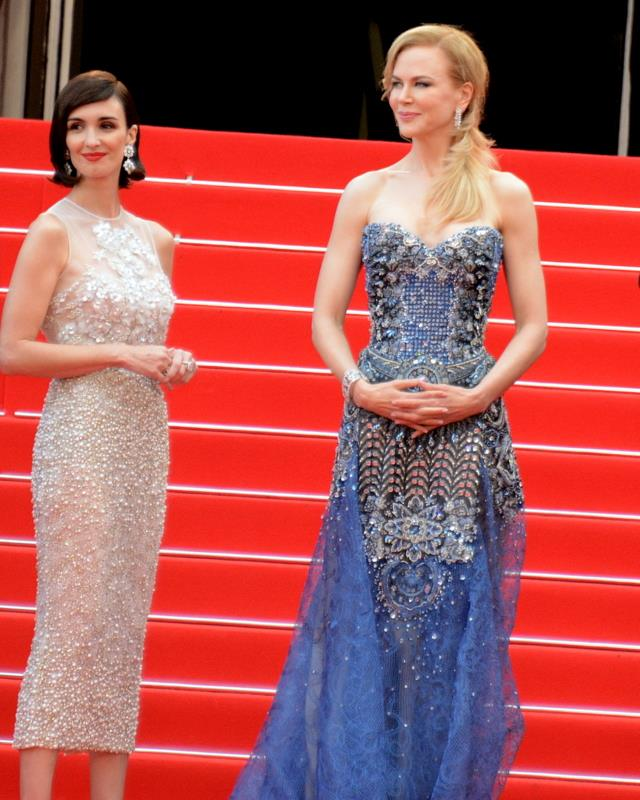
Vega and Nicole Kidman at the 2014 Cannes Film Festival

Year	Award	Category	Work	Result	Ref.
2001	48th Ondas Awards	Best Actress	Sex and Lucia	Won	
2002	57th CEC Medals	Best Actress	Mine Alone	Nominated	
2002	46th Sant Jordi Awards	Best Spanish Actress	Sex and Lucia & Mine Alone	Won	
2002	52nd Fotogramas de Plata	Best Film Actress	Sex and Lucia	Nominated	
2002	16th Goya Awards	Best New Actress	Sex and Lucia	Won	
2002	16th Goya Awards	Best Actress	Mine Alone	Nominated	
2002	11th Actors Union Awards	Best Film Performance in a Leading Role		Nominated	
2002	11th Actors Union Awards	Best New Performance		Nominated	
2003	53rd Fotogramas de Plata	Best Actress	The Other Side of the Bed	Nominated	
2004	17th European Film Awards	Jameson People's Choice Award for Best Actress	Carmen	Nominated	
2005	Imagen Awards	Best Actress	Spanglish	Nominated	
2020	29th Actors and Actresses Union Awards	Best Actress in an International Production	The OA	Nominated	
2021	4th Berlanga Awards	Best Actress	Wetland	Nominated	
2022	1st Carmen Awards	Best Actress	The House of Snails	Nominated	
2024	32nd Actors and Actresses Union Awards	Best Actress in an International Production	Kaleidoscope	Nominated	
2025	4th Carmen Awards	Best New Director	Rita	Won	
2025	4th Carmen Awards	Best Original Screenplay	Rita	Nominated	
2025	4th Carmen Awards	Best Supporting Actress	Rita	Nominated	
2025	39th Goya Awards	Best New Director	Rita	Pending	
