= María Isasi =

Spanish actress (born 1975)

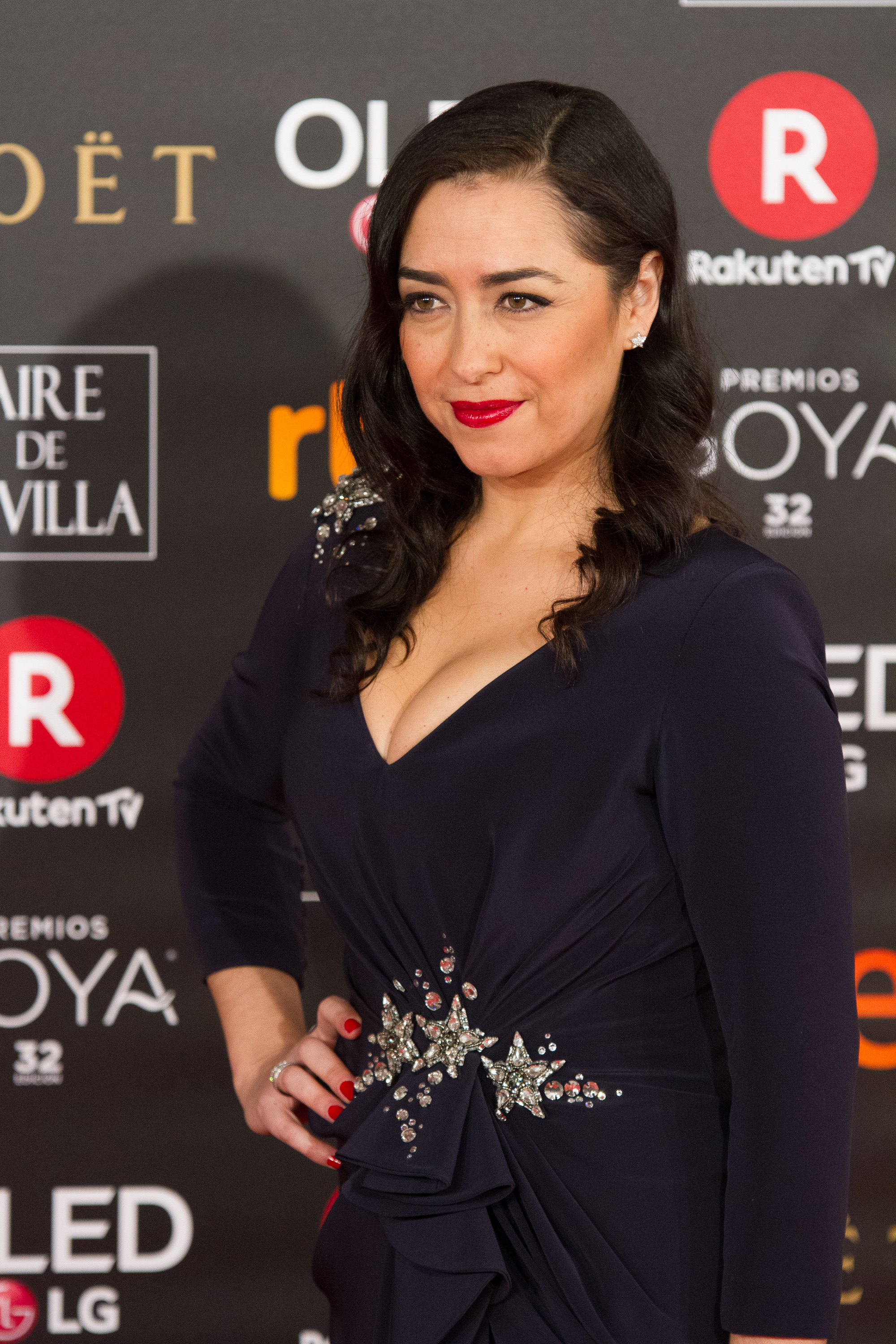
- Isasi at the 2018 Goya Awards
- Born: María Carlota Isasi-Isasmendi Paredes; 29 September 1975 (age 50); Madrid, Spain
- Occupation: Actress
- Years active: 1997–present
- Parents: Antonio Isasi-Isasmendi (father); Marisa Paredes (mother)

María Carlota Isasi-Isasmendi Paredes (born 29 September 1975) is a Spanish actress.

Isasi is the daughter of Spanish parents, film director Antonio Isasi-Isasmendi and actress Marisa Paredes. She graduated in Fine Arts and studied acting at the Juan Carlos Corazza Academy.

== Trajectory ==
Her filmography includes Volavérunt, by Bigas Luna; Los amantes del círculo polar, by Julio Médem; El caballero Don Quijote, by Manuel Gutiérrez Aragón; Salvajes, by Carlos Molinero, for which she was nominated to the Goya Award for Best New Actress in 2002, and Las trece rosas, by Emilio Martínez Lázaro.

She has also made some incursions into television, as in an episode of the Telecinco series Hermanos y detectives. In 2004 she participated in several episodes of the hit series Aquí no hay quien viva, asking Natalia (Sofia Nieto) as a surrogate mother. Later, she changed her mind and left Natalia with the baby, as she wanted to break her marriage and did not know what she could do with the baby. At the end of 2009 she began her career in the series of La 1 Amar en tiempos revueltos.

She is known for her interpretation of Diana, the hairdresser of the theater commanded by the well-known actress Estela del Val (Cayetana Guillén-Cuervo). She is the best friend of Rosa (Bárbara Lennie), and is in love with Salvador Bellido Huerga (Pep Munné). She worked from October 2009 to September 2010 in the series.

From September 9 to October 31, 2010, she participated in the production of All My Sons by Arthur Miller, directed by Claudio Tolcachir, at the Madrid's Teatro Español. For her role, small but very lucid and that gives her five minutes where she shines for her performance, she was awarded on November 2, 2010 with the Ojo Crítico de Teatro Award, granted by Radio Nacional de España.

In 2011 she participated in the LaSexta series BuenAgente. In 2012 she played the lead role in the play ¡Sin paga, nadie paga! with Pablo Carbonell. Between July 2013 and April 2014 she played the role of Polixena in the Greek tragedy Hécuba by Eurípides at the Festival de Teatro Clásico de Mérida, with a subsequent tour of Spain.

She participated in the TVE series Seis Hermanas where she gives life to the character of Elpidia. Although the series began on 22 April 2015, her character, a maid in Silva's house, would arrive to the series some time later and until the end of it, on 21 April 2017. In Seis Hermanas she will be Antonia's cousin, owner of the "Ambigú" and aunt of Gabriel, the later Count of Barnos. She will also be the lover of Raimundo, the husband of Merceditas, another of the maids of Casa Silva. From this relationship she will become pregnant but the child will never be born.

She participated in the series Centro médico as Dr Angela Vega (Episode 1012 - 1167) and appeared in the final chapter number 1175) between 2018-January 2019.

On stage, she headed the cast of Comedia sin título by Federico García Lorca (2019), in a version by Alberto Conejero.

== Filmography ==
Year	Series	Character	Channel	Duration
2000	Policías, en el corazón de la calle	Víctima	Antena 3	1 episode
2002	Cuéntame cómo pasó	Adela	La 1	2 episodes
2005	A tortas con la vida	Mamen	Antena 3	1 episode
2005 - 2006	Aquí no hay quien viva	Elena	Antena 3	2 episodes
2007	Sin Miedo a Soñar		La Sexta	2 episodes
2009 - 2010	Amar en tiempos revueltos	Fernanda "Diana" Colorado	La 1	256 episodes
2010	Estudio 1	Celia	La 1	1 episode
2011	La muerte a escena	Fernanda "Diana" Colorado	La 1	2 episodes
2011	BuenAgente	Charo	La Sexta	13 episodes
2012	Carta a Eva	Funcionaria prisión	La 1	2 episodes
2016 - 2017	Seis hermanas	Elpidia	La 1	31 episodes
2018 - 2019	Centro médico	Doctora Ángela Vega	La 1	157 episodes
2020	Las chicas del cable	Dolores	Netflix	5 episodes
2020	Historias de Alcafrán	Marina	La 1	5 episodes

== Accolades ==
Year	Award	Category	Work	Result	Ref.
2002	16th Goya Awards	Best New Actress	Savages	Nominated	
2008	17th Actors and Actresses Union Awards	Best Film Actress in a Minor Role	13 Roses	Nominated	
2010	Critical Eye Award	Theatre	n/a	Won	
2010	19th Actors and Actresses Union Awards	Best TV Actress in a Leading Role	Días sin luz	Nominated	
2011	20th Actors and Actresses Union Awards	Best Stage Actress in a Minor Role	Todos eran mis hijos	Nominated	
2012	21st Actors and Actresses Union Awards	Best Stage Actress in a Minor Role	Incrementum	Won	
2018	27th Actors and Actresses Union Awards	Best Stage Actress in a Secondary Role	La Orestíada	Won	
