= Carmen Balagué =

Spanish actress

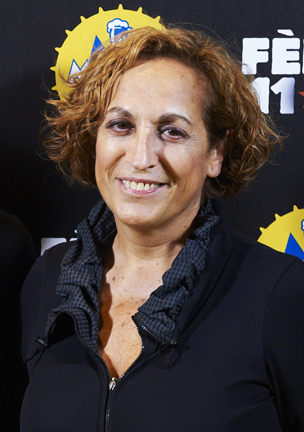
- Born: 17 July 1952 (age 73); Barcelona, Spain
- Occupation: Actress
- Years active: 1977-present

Carmen Balagué (born 17 July 1952) is a Spanish actress. She appeared in more than sixty films since 1977.

== Selected filmography ==
Film
Year	Title	Role	Notes
1987	Calé	Elena	
1990	Contra el viento	Dolores	
1992	Salsa rosa	Directora del Hospital	
1992	Yo me bajo en la próxima, ¿y usted?	Secretaria	
1994	Mi hermano del alma	Limpiadora	
1994	All Men Are the Same	Pilar	
1995	Boca a boca	Portera	
1996	Alma gitana		
1996	Africa		
1996	Pon un hombre en tu vida	Enfermera de la UCI	
1997	Love Can Seriously Damage Your Health	Pasajera	
1997	Retrato de mujer con hombre al fondo	Clienta	
1997	Completo confort	Clienta	
1997	Perdona bonita, pero Lucas me quería a mí	Camarera	
1997	¿De qué se ríen las mujeres?		
1998	Nada en la nevera	Mujer del marido infiel	
1998	El grito en el cielo	Merche	
1999	Between Your Legs	Begoña	
1999	All About My Mother	Theatre actress	
1999	Pepe Guindo	Mother	
2001	No Shame	Nacha	
2001	Salvajes	Sonsoles	
2001	No Shame	Nacha	
2001	Sagitario	Marta	
2008	Mediterranean Food	Loren	
2012	Volare	Pau	

TV
Year	Title	Role	Notes
1985	Platos Rotos	Angus	
1990	Eva y Adan, agencia matrimonial	Enfermera	
1991	Las chicas de hoy en dia	Cartera	
1992	Hasta luego cocodrilo	Laura	
1994-1996	Canguros	Amparo	
1995	Pepa y Pepe	Raquel	
1997-1998	Querido maestro	Angeles Fuentes	
2002-2004	Majoria absoluta	Marta	
2004-2006	Aquí no hay quien viva	Nieves Cuesta	
2008-2009	13 anys i un dia	Margot	
2016–present	Cuentame como paso	Cassandra	
