= Don't Tempt Me =

2001 film by Agustín Díaz Yanes

- Promotional poster by Oscar Mariné
- Directed by: Agustín Díaz Yanes
- Written by: Agustín Díaz Yanes
- Produced by: Gerardo Herrero; Eduardo Campoy
- Starring: Penélope Cruz; Demián Bichir; Javier Bardem; Gael García Bernal
- Music by: Bernardo Bonezzi
- Distributed by: Casa Nova Films
- Release dates: 30 November 2001 (Spain); 22 August 2003 (Mexico); 4 February 2005 (U.S.)
- Running time: 115 minutes
- Countries: Spain; Mexico
- Language: Spanish

Don't Tempt Me (Spanish: Bendito Infierno, also known as Sin noticias de Dios in Spanish and No News From God in English) is a 2001 Mexican and Spanish co-production comedy film. The screenplay for the film was written especially for Penélope Cruz and Victoria Abril by the award-winning Spanish writer and director Agustín Díaz Yanes of Nadie hablará de nosotras cuando hayamos muerto.

== Plot ==
Lola, who works as a nightclub singer in Heaven, is sent by her boss Marina on a mission to Earth to save the soul of a Spanish boxer called Manny. His brain damaged in his last bout, with any blow liable to carry him off, he is deeply in debt and suicidal. Lola appears as his former wife, wanting to be with him again, and tries to get him to reconcile with his mother. Living with him and his mood swings is hard work however, he being a total chauvinist interested in little beyond boxing, food and sex.

Carmen, who works as a waitress in Hell, is sent by her boss Davenport to get Manny into the ring again. She appears as his cousin and takes the spare room in the flat. While Lola plays the meek housewife, Carmen is flashy and lesbian. During the day, both she and Lola take jobs in a hypermarket, where they sympathise with the downtrodden staff and despise the corrupt management.

Manny, as well as guilt over his breach with his mother, is regularly harassed by a couple of plainclothes heavies sent by a corrupt police chief he owes money to. While the angelic Lola tries to buy time, the diabolic Carmen tells Manny that he could win the money by fighting again.

Hell is getting very full and there are serious divisions among the management. In an effort to save his position, Davenport makes a secret deal with Marina, whom he admires greatly. His argument is that without Heaven there would be no Hell, and vice versa. People on Earth, he feels, should have a free choice. So in this one case he is happy to see Manny choose Heaven, which is getting dangerously empty, and tells Carmen to work with rather than against Lola.

The two women decide to rob the hypermarket and give the proceeds to Manny, who can pay off the cops with the stolen money and need never fight again. After lifting the day's takings from the cashier's office at gunpoint, they try to walk out through the crowded store, until two of the management start shooting. The women manage in the end to escape with the money, but on getting back to Manny's flat find the crooked police there with him. After he enables the two women to escape the trap, the cops beat him to death.

For that last sacrifice, after some debate he is allowed into Heaven. But Lola and Carmen are caught, and locked away in a Spanish prison. When released, Carmen gets promotion in Hell far above her waitress status and is granted her wish of becoming a man again.

== Cast ==
- Victoria Abril - Lola Nevado
- Penélope Cruz - Carmen Ramos
- Demián Bichir - Manny
- Gemma Jones - Nancy
- Fanny Ardant - Marina D'Angelo
- Juan Echanove - Supermarket manager
- Gael García Bernal - Davenport
- Emilio Gutiérrez Caba - Police chief
- Cristina Marcos - Police officer
- Luis Tosar - Police officer
- Bruno Bichir - Eduardo
- Elena Anaya - Pili
- Peter McDonald - Henry
- Elsa Pataky - Waitress in Hell

== Reception ==
=== Critical response ===
Don't Tempt Me has an approval rating of 38% on review aggregator website Rotten Tomatoes, based on 29 reviews, and an average rating of 5.1/10. The website's critical consensus states: "More Hellish than it is Heavenly, Agustín Díaz Yanes' black comedy about the Earthly duel between two angels doesn't have enough genuine laughs to support its far-fetched premise". Metacritic assigned the film a weighted average score of 31 out of 100, based on 12 critics, indicating "generally unfavorable reviews".

=== Awards and nominations ===
The film was nominated for the Goya Awards in 2002 in the categories of Best Picture, Best Actress (Victoria Abril) and Best Supporting Actor (Gael García Bernal).

Bichir won the "Best Bichir in a Movie" MTV Movie Awards-Mexico.

== Trivia ==
Javier Bardem (Penélope Cruz's later real-life husband) makes an unbilled cameo appearance (without dialogue) at the very end of the film as Cruz's character's male form.
