= María José Alfonso =

Spanish actress

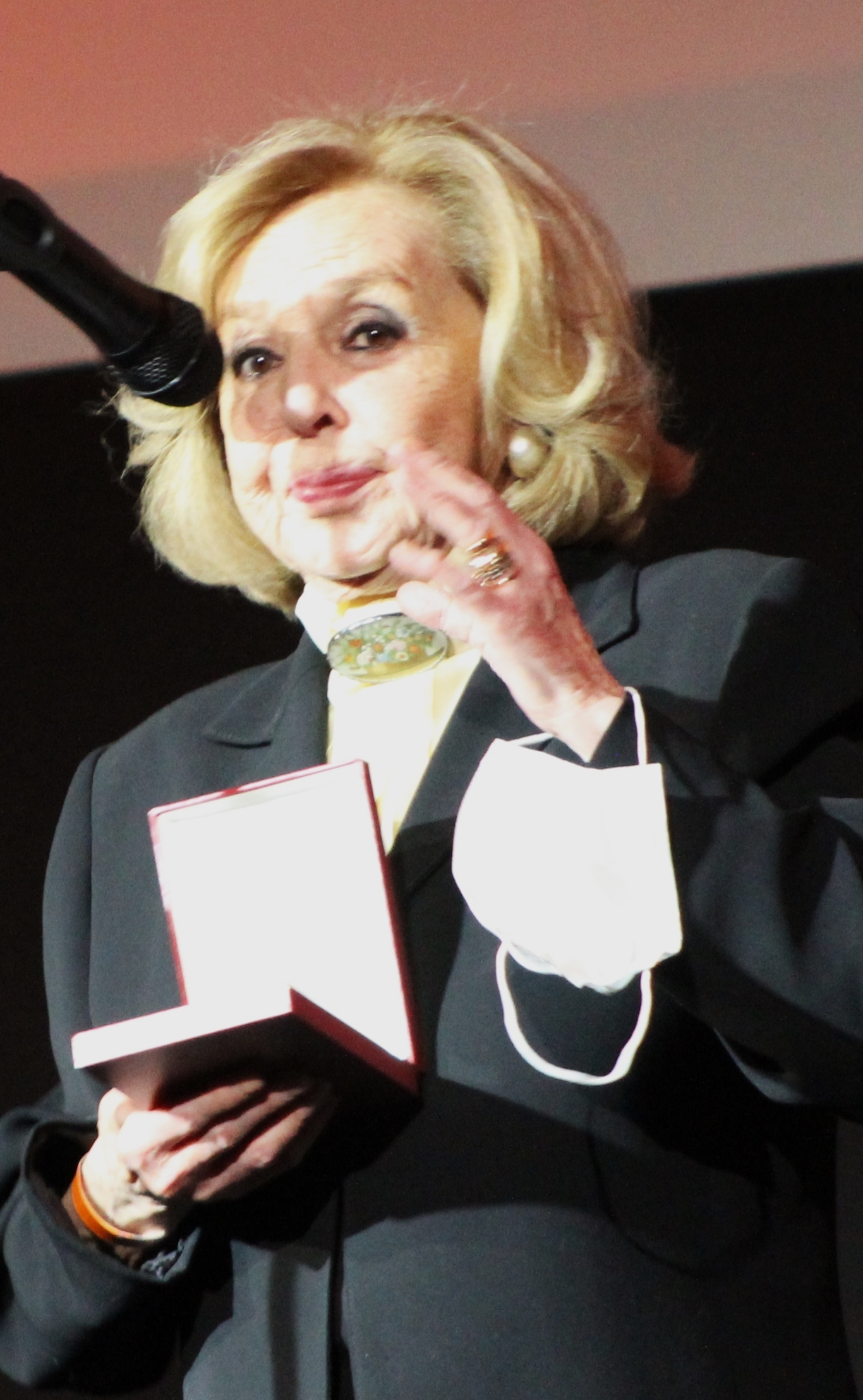
- Born: María Josefa Alfonso Mingo; 27 March 1940 (age 86); Madrid, Spain
- Occupation: Actress
- Years active: 1962-present

María Josefa Alfonso Mingo (born 27 March 1940) is a Spanish actress. She has appeared in more than ninety films since 1962.

== Biography ==
After studying drama, she made her theater debut in the play The Taming of the Shrew, alongside Fernando Fernán Gómez and Analía Gadé. Shortly thereafter, she began acting in films, appearing in Fernando Palacios's Vuelve San Valentín in 1962. This was followed by Manuel Summers's La gran familia (1962) and La niña de luto (1964), which launched her career in Cinema of Spain.

She made her television debut in 1961 on Fernando García de la Vega's music program Escala en hi-fi, where she performed songs using playback technology.

As a film actress, she starred in prestigious films such as Mario Camus' The Wind Blows Hot in Summer (Con el viento solano, 1965), Mariano Ozores' Manolo at Night (1973), and Pedro Masó's The Family, Thank You Very Much (1979).

With a career spanning more than 50 years, she has worked alongside artists such as Ramón del Valle-Inclán, Enrique Jardiel Poncela, Jaime Salom, and Antonio Gala.

== Filmography ==
Year	Title	Role	Notes
1962	La gran familia		
1963	La becerrada	Sor Matilde	
1964	The Girl in Mourning		
1965	Behind the Mask of Zorro	Manuela	
1966	With the East Wind	Lupe	
2001	Mine Alone	Madre Angela	

== Awards ==
=== Medals Circle of Cinematographic Writers ===
Year	Category	Movie	Outcome	Ref.
1964	Best actress	The girl in mourning	Winner	
