= Ventura Pons =

Spanish movie director (1945–2024)

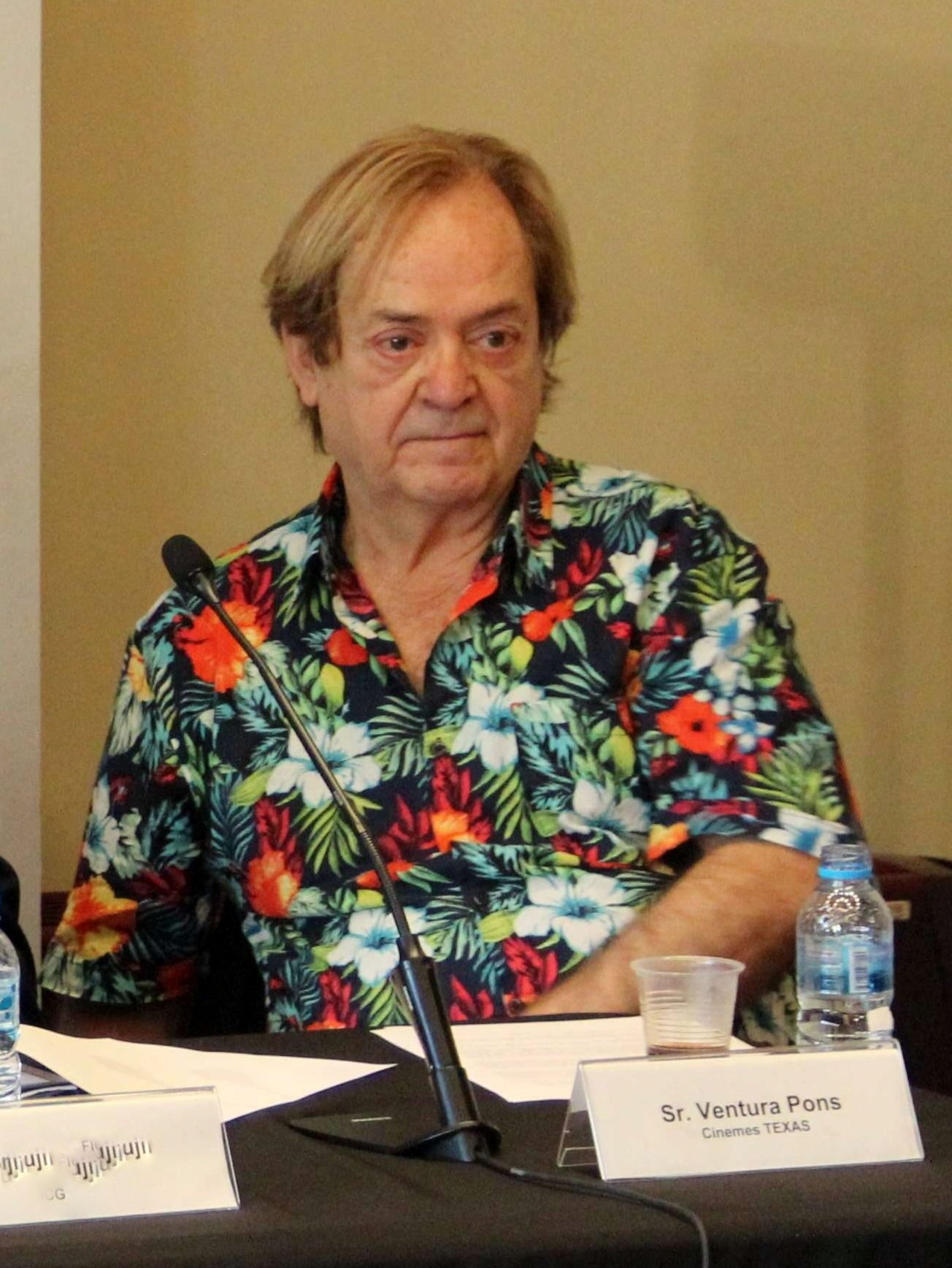
Pons in 2016

Ventura Pons Sala (Catalan pronunciation: [bənˈtuɾə ˈpɔns]; 25 July 1945 – 8 January 2024) was a Spanish film director. He mainly directed films in Catalan but also in Spanish and English. Pons directed 32 feature films and is one of the best-known Catalan film directors. His films are continuously programmed in the most prestigious international festivals, almost 810 up to now, and distributed in many countries around the world.

== Life and career ==
Pons was vice-president of the Spanish Film Academy and the subject of more than 34 international homages and retrospectives: London's ICA (Institute of Contemporary Arts), New York's Lincoln Center and in the world's foremost cinematheques, such as those in Los Angeles, Mexico, Buenos Aires, Santiago, Caracas, Belgrade, Istanbul, Warsaw, Tel-Aviv, Jerusalem, and Haifa, among many others.

Pons also received international "Lifetime Achievement Awards" at film festivals in Chicago, Galway, Piešťany, Lima, Turin, and Montpellier.

In Spain, he received the Catalan National Film Award, the Spanish Fine Arts Gold Medal, the Catalan Sant Jordi Cross, the Catalan Film Academy's Gaudi Honorary Award, the Ondas Award, the City of Huesca Award, the Count Jaume d’Urgell Award, and the Jordi Dauder Award, among many others.

In 2012, the University of Colorado at Denver held an academic Conference on his cinema. Vervuert has published a book about this conference: Ventura Pons: An Exceptional Gaze from the Catalan Cinema.

Pons published a book of memoirs, Mine (and the Others), written in 2011, and in 2017, he published I Have Tasted the Fruits of the Tree of Life. He also published a world tour diary, entitled 54 Days and a Bit More in 2012.

Pons died on 8 January 2024, at the age of 78.

== Filmography ==
- 1978: Ocana, an Intermittent Portrait (Ocaña, retrat intermitent)
- 1979: Informe sobre el FAGC* 2018: Be Happy!
- 1981: The Vicary of Olot (El vicari d'Olot)
- 1986: The Blonde at the Bar (La rossa del bar)
- 1989: Damned Misery! (Puta misèria!)
- 1990: What's Your Bet, Mari Pili? (Què t'hi jugues, Mari Pili?)
- 1992: Tonight Or Never (Aquesta nit o mai)
- 1993: Rosita, Please!
- 1994: What It's All About (El perquè de tot plegat)
- 1996: Actresses (Actrius)
- 1997: Caresses (Carícies)
- 1998: Beloved/Friend (Amic / Amat)
- 1999: To Die (Or Not) (Morir (o no))
- 2000: Anita Takes a Chance (Anita no perd el tren)
- 2001: Food of Love (Menja d'amor)
- 2002: El Gran Gato
- 2004: Idiot Love (Amor idiota)
- 2005: Wounded Animals (Animals ferits)
- 2006: Life on the Edge (La vida abismal)
- 2007: Barcelona (un mapa)
- 2008: Strangers (Forasters)
- 2009: A la deriva
- 2010: A Thousand fools (Mil cretins)
- 2011: Year of Grace ("Any de Gràcia")
- 2013: Un berenar a Ginebra ("An afternoon in Geneva")
- 2013: Ignasi M.
- 2015: El virus de la por ("Virus of Fear")
- 2015: Cola, Colita, Colassa ("Ode to Barcelona")
- 2016: Oh, quina joia! ("Oh, What a Joy!")
- 2016: Sabates Grosses ("The Bigger, the Better")
- 2017: Universal i Faraona ("Universal and Pharaoh")
- 2017: Miss Dalí
- 2018: Univers(o) Pecanins
- 2018: Be Happy!,
