= Agustín Díaz Yanes =

Spanish film director

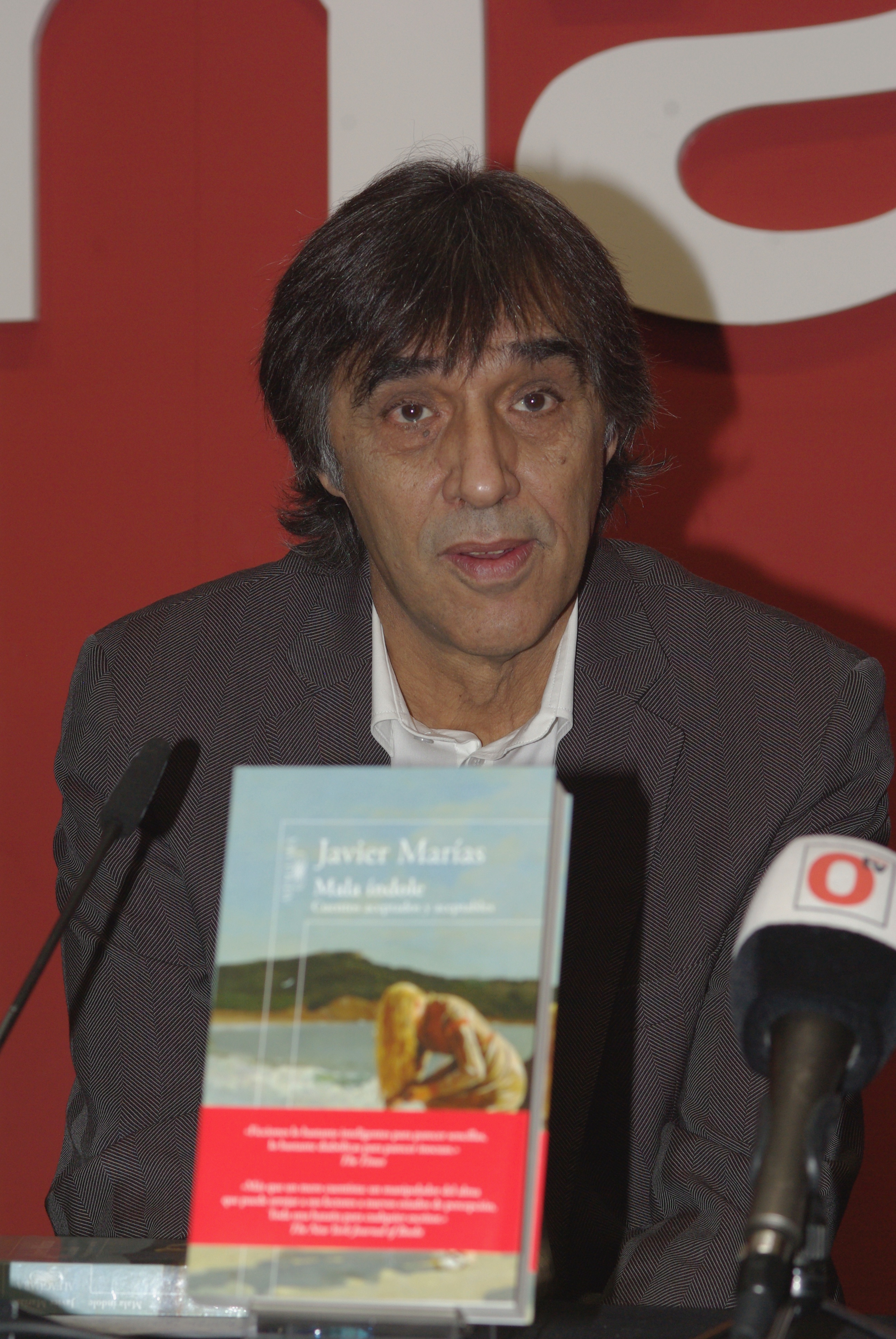
Agustín Díaz Yanes in 2012

Agustín Díaz Yanes (born 1950, in Madrid) is a Spanish Goya Award-winning screenwriter and film director.

== Filmography ==
=== Screenwriter ===
- Al límite (1997)
- Belmonte (1995)
- Demasiado corazón (1992)
- A solas contigo (1990)
- Baton Rouge (1988)
- Barrios altos (1987)

=== Film director and screenwriter ===
Year	Film		Goya Awards	
	English title	Original title	Nominations	Won
1995	Nobody Will Speak of Us When We're Dead	Nadie hablará de nosotras cuando hayamos muerto	10	8
2001	Don't Tempt Me	Sin noticias de Dios	11	0
2006	Alatriste		15	3
2008	Just Walking	Sólo quiero caminar	11	1
2017	Gold	Oro	6	0
