= List of horror films of 2001 =

A list of horror films released in 2001.

Horror films released in 2001
Title	Director	Cast	Country	Notes
Arachnid	Jack Sholder	Alex Reid, Chris Potter, Pepe Sancho	Spain	
The Attic Expeditions	Jeremy Kasten	Andras Jones, Seth Green, Jeffrey Combs	United States	
Bangkok Haunted	Oxide Pang Chun, Pisut Praesangeam	Pimsiree Pimsee, Pramote Seangsorn	Thailand	
Bones	Ernest R. Dickerson	Pam Grier, Snoop Dogg, Bianca Lawson	United States	
The Breed	Michael Oblowitz	Bai Ling, Bokeem Woodbine, Lo Ming	United States	
The Brotherhood 2: Young Warlocks	David DeCoteau	Sean Faris, Noah Frank, Stacey Scowley	United States	
Brotherhood of the Wolf	Christophe Gans	Samuel Le Bihan, Mark Dacascos, Émilie Dequenne	France	
The Bunker	Rob Green	Jason Flemyng, Charley Boorman, Jack Davenport	United Kingdom	
Children of the Corn: Revelation	Guy Magar	Claudette Mink, Kyle Cassie, Michael Ironside	United States	
Children of the Living Dead	Tor Ramsey	A. Barrett Worland, Jamie McCoy	United States	
Christmas Nightmare	Vince Di Meglio	Kevin VanHook, Tiffany Baker, Charlie Finelli	United States	
Cradle of Fear	Alex Chandon	Dani Filth, Emily Booth, Eileen Daly	United Kingdom	
Dagon	Stuart Gordon	Ezra Godden, Francisco Rabal, Raquel Meroño	Spain	
Dorian	Allan A. Goldstein	Malcolm McDowell, Jennifer Nitsch, Christoph Waltz	Canada; United Kingdom	
Earth vs. the Spider	Scott Ziehl	Devon Gummersall	United States	
Elvira's Haunted Hills	Sam Irvin	Cassandra Peterson, Richard O'Brien, Mary Scheer	United States	Horror comedy
Faust: Love of the Damned	Brian Yuzna	Mark Frost, Isabel Brooke, Jeffrey Combs	Spain	
Fausto 5.0	Isidro Ortiz, Alex Olle, Carlus Padrissa	Miguel Ángel Solá, Eduard Fernández, Najwa Nimri	Spain	
Fear of the Dark	Glen Baisley	Rosemary Gore, Mike Lane, Kirk Larsen	United States	
Final Stab	David DeCoteau	Brannon Gould, Laila Reece Landon, Donnie Eichar	United States	
The Forsaken	J. S. Cardone	Kerr Smith, Brendan Fehr, Izabella Miko	United States	
Frailty	Bill Paxton	Bill Paxton, Matthew McConaughey, Powers Boothe	United States	
From Hell	Hughes Brothers	Johnny Depp, Heather Graham, Ian Holm	United States	
Frost: Portrait of a Vampire	Kevin VanHook	Gary Busey, Amy Angelowicz, Michael Lloyd Gilliland	United States	
Ghosts of Mars	John Carpenter	Ice Cube, Natasha Henstridge, Jason Statham	United States	
The Happiness of the Katakuris	Takashi Miike	Kenji Sawada, Keiko Matsuzaka, Shinji Takeda	Japan	
Haunted Castle	Ben Stassen	Harry Shearer	United States	
Horror Vision	Danny Draven	James Black, Josh Covitt	United States	
How to Make a Monster	George Huang	Clea Duvall, Steven Culp, Tyler Mane	United States	Science fiction horror
I Spit on Your Corpse, I Piss on Your Grave	Eric Stanze	Emily Haack, Shaun Snow	United States	
Jason X	James Isaac	Kane Hodder, Lexa Doig, Lisa Ryder	United States	
Jeepers Creepers	Victor Salva	Gina Philips, Justin Long, Jonathan Breck	United States	
Joy Ride	John Dahl	Steve Zahn, Paul Walker, Leelee Sobieski,	United States	
Jesus Christ Vampire Hunter	Lee Gordon Demarbre	Josh Grace, Murielle Varhelyi, Glen Douglas	Canada	
Kairo	Kiyoshi Kurosawa	Haruhiko Kato, Kumiko Asō, Koyuki	Japan	
Killer Buzz	Jeff Hare	Gabrielle Anwar, Rutger Hauer, Craig Sheffer	United States	
Love Bites	Antoine de Caunes	Guillaume Canet, Gérard Lanvin, Asia Argento	France	Horror comedy
The Mangler 2	Michael Hamilton-Wright	Lance Henriksen, William Sanderson, Chelse Swain	United States	
Mimic 2	Jean de Segonzac	Jon Polito, Bruno Campos, Will Estes	United States	
Mulholland Drive	David Lynch	Naomi Watts, Laura Elena Harring, Justin Theroux	United States	
Mulva: Zombie Ass Kicker!	Chris Seaver	Missy Donatuti, Lloyd Kaufman, Debbie Rochon	United States	
Mutation 2: Generation Dead	Timo Rose	Thomas Kercmar, Olaf Ittenbach, Ted Geoghegan	Germany	
The Others	Alejandro Amenábar	Nicole Kidman, Fionnula Flanagan	United States; Spain	
Plaga Zombie: Mutant Zone	Pablo Parés, Hernán Sáez	Germán Magariños, Berta Muñiz, Alejandro Nagy	Argentina	Second entry in the Plaga Zombie film series.
Raptor	Jay Andrews	Corbin Bernsen, Alexandra Raines, GiGi Erneta	United States	
The Resurrection Game	Mike Watt	Ray Yeo, Bill Homan, Amy Lynn Best	United States	
Route 666	William Wesley	Lou Diamond Phillips, Lori Petty, Alex McArthur	United States	
Scary Movie 2	Keenen Ivory Wayans	Shawn Wayans, Marlon Wayans, Anna Faris	United States	Horror comedy
Session 9	Brad Anderson	David Caruso, Peter Mullan, Josh Lucas	United States	
She Creature	Sebastian Gutierrez	Rufus Sewell, Carla Gugino, Rya Kihlstedt	United States	
Slashers	Maurice Devereaux	Jerry Sprio, Neil Napier, Carolina Pla	Canada	
Soft for Digging	J.T. Petty	Kate Petty, Edmond Mercier, Mia Todd	United States	
Sorum	Yoon Jong-chan	Kim Myung-min, Jang Jin-young, Gi Ju-bong	South Korea	
Stacy	Naoyuki Tomomatsu		Japan	
There is a Secret in my Soup	Yeung Chi Kin	Cherry Chan, Chan Chung Wai, Christy Cheung	Hong Kong	
Thir13en Ghosts	Steve Beck	Tony Shalhoub, Embeth Davidtz, Matthew Lillard	United States	
Tomie: Rebirth	Takashi Shimizu	Miki Sakai, Satoshi Tsumabuki	Japan	
Tremors 3: Back to Perfection	Brent Maddock	Michael Gross, Charlotte Stewart, Ariana Richards	United States	
Trouble Every Day	Claire Denis	Béatrice Dalle	France	
Unseen Evil	Jay Woelfel	Richard Hatch, Tim Thomerson, Cindi Braun	United States	
Valentine	Jamie Blanks	Marley Shelton, Denise Richards, Katherine Heigl	United States	
Visible Secret	Ann Hui	Eason Chan, Shu Qi, Anthony Wong	Hong Kong	
Wendigo	Larry Fessenden	Patricia Clarkson, Jake Weber	United States	
Wishmaster 3: Beyond Gates Of Hell	Chris Angel	A.J. Cook, Aaron Smolinski, Jason Connery	United States	
