= List of Argentine films of 2001 =

A list of films produced in Argentina in 2001:

== 2001 ==
| Title | Director | Actors | Genre | Comments |
|---|---|---|---|---|
| Un Amor en Moisés Ville | Daniel Barone | Víctor Laplace | Drama | |
| El Amor y el espanto | Juan Carlos Desanzo | Víctor Laplace | Drama | A fictitious event in the life of Jorge Luis Borges |
| Animalada | Sergio Bizzio | Carlos Roffé | Black comedy | A wealthy man falls in love with a sheep |
| Antigua vida mía | Héctor Olivera | Ana Belén, Cecilia Roth | Drama | About the troubled relationships of two upper-class women in Buenos Aires |
| El Armario | Gustavo Corrado | Jean Pierre Reguerraz, Pamela Rementería | | |
| Arregui, la noticia del día | | Enrique Pinti, Carmen Maura | Comedy | A tragicomedy about corruption |
| Bolivia | Israel Adrián Caetano | Freddy Flores | Drama | The film takes place in a café in the suburb of Villa Crespo |
| La Ciénaga | Lucrecia Martel | Graciela Borges, Mercedes Morán, Martín Adjemián | Drama | About life in a self-pitying bourgeois family |
| Déjala correr | Alberto Lecchi | Nicolás Cabré, Fabián Vena, Pablo Rago, Florencia Bertotti, Gabriel Goity, Julieta Díaz | Comedy | |

| Title | Director | Cast | Genre | Notes |
|---|---|---|---|---|
| Chiquititas: Rincón de luz | José Luis Massa | Romina Yan, Facundo Arana | Adventure | The story of a young girl given the option to live whatever predestined life she wants or to form her own destiny |
| Freedom | Lisandro Alonso | | | Screened at the 2001 Cannes Film Festival |
| La Fuga | Eduardo Mignogna | Ricardo Darín, Patricio Contreras, Miguel Ángel Solá | Drama | In 1928, seven inmates flee from a prison. The film follows their fates. |
| El Hijo de la Novia | Juan J. Campanella | Ricardo Darín, Norma Aleandro, Héctor Alterio | Comedy | Nominated for an Academy Award |
| Figli/Hijos | Marco Bechis | | | |
| Rosarigasinos | Rodrigo Grande | Federico Luppi, Ulises Dumont | | Two friends from prison cope with life outside after being released. |
| Plaga Zombie: Zona Mutante | Pablo Parés | Berta Muñiz, Pablo Parés | Horror | A zombie-horror film series and a sequel to Plaga Zombie. |
| Los pasos perdidos | Manane Rodríguez | Irene Visedo, Luis Brandoni, Federico Luppi | Drama | A family drama about an Argentine family in Spain |
| Inheritance | Paula Hernández | | | Entered into the 23rd Moscow International Film Festival |

== See also ==
- 2001 in Argentina

== External links and references ==
- Argentine films of 2001 at the Internet Movie Database
