= 2001 in film =

The year 2001 in film involved some significant events, including the first installments of the Harry Potter, Fast & Furious, Spy Kids, Monsters, Inc. and Shrek franchises, and The Lord of the Rings and Ocean's trilogies. Significant non-English language films released included Monsoon Wedding, Amélie and Spirited Away. There was one film, Harry Potter and the Philosopher's Stone, that passed over $1 billion in a re-release of 2020.

The inaugural entries of the Harry Potter and Lord of the Rings film franchises prompted a shift in both the film and literary communities by propelling fantasy into mainstream culture, popularising young adult novels, and reforming the blockbuster to promote film franchises and cater to fandom communities.

== Highest-grossing films ==
The top 10 films released in 2001 by worldwide gross are listed as follows:

Highest-grossing films of 2001
Rank	Title	Distributor	Worldwide gross
1	Harry Potter and the Philosopher's Stone	Warner Bros.	$974,755,371
2	The Lord of the Rings: The Fellowship of the Ring	New Line	$883,726,270
3	Monsters, Inc.	Buena Vista	$528,773,250
4	Shrek	DreamWorks	$484,944,448
5	Ocean's Eleven	Warner Bros.	$450,717,150
6	Pearl Harbor	Buena Vista	$449,220,945
7	The Mummy Returns	Universal	$433,013,274
8	Jurassic Park III	Universal	$368,780,809
9	Planet of the Apes	20th Century Fox	$362,211,740
10	Hannibal	MGM / Universal	$351,692,268

Harry Potter and the Philosopher's Stone grossed $974 million, and became the second highest-grossing film of all time. It was also the highest-grossing film in the Harry Potter film franchise before the finale, Harry Potter and the Deathly Hallows – Part 2, surpassed it in 2011.

2001 was the first time that two films released in the same year grossed more than $800 million at the box office, with Harry Potter and the Philosopher's Stone and The Lord of the Rings: The Fellowship of the Ring surpassing the milestone.

The highest-grossing non-English film was Studio Ghibli's anime Spirited Away, which was the 15th highest-grossing film of the year.

== Events ==
- May 18 – Shrek was released to critical acclaim and went on to win the first Academy Award for Best Animated Feature the following year beating out Jimmy Neutron: Boy Genius and Monsters, Inc.
- June 22 – The Fast and the Furious is released, launching one of the highest-grossing franchises in film history.
- August 8 – actors Tom Cruise and Nicole Kidman divorce.
- November 2 – Monsters, Inc. opens with the best ticket sales ever for an animated film and the 6th-best of all time.
- November 16 and December 19 – The beginning of two acclaimed fantasy film series based on best-selling novels: Harry Potter and The Lord of the Rings, respectively.

=== Award ceremonies ===
- 6th Empire Awards

== Awards ==
Category/Organisation	7th Critics' Choice Awards January 11, 2002	59th Golden Globe Awards January 20, 2002		55th BAFTA Awards February 24, 2002	Producers, Directors, Screen Actors, and Writers Guild Awards	74th Academy Awards March 24, 2002
Category/Organisation	7th Critics' Choice Awards January 11, 2002	Drama	Musical or Comedy	55th BAFTA Awards February 24, 2002	Producers, Directors, Screen Actors, and Writers Guild Awards	74th Academy Awards March 24, 2002
Best Film	A Beautiful Mind		Moulin Rouge!	The Lord of the Rings: The Fellowship of the Ring	Moulin Rouge!	A Beautiful Mind
Best Director	Ron Howard; A Beautiful Mind; Baz Luhrmann; Moulin Rouge!	Robert Altman; Gosford Park		Peter Jackson; The Lord of the Rings: The Fellowship of the Ring	Ron Howard; A Beautiful Mind	
Best Actor	Russell Crowe; A Beautiful Mind		Gene Hackman; The Royal Tenenbaums	Russell Crowe; A Beautiful Mind		Denzel Washington; Training Day
Best Actress	Sissy Spacek; In the Bedroom		Nicole Kidman; Moulin Rouge!	Judi Dench; Iris	Halle Berry; Monster's Ball	
Best Supporting Actor	Ben Kingsley; Sexy Beast	Jim Broadbent; Iris		Jim Broadbent; Moulin Rouge!	Ian McKellen; The Lord of the Rings: The Fellowship of the Ring	Jim Broadbent; Iris
Best Supporting Actress	Jennifer Connelly; A Beautiful Mind				Helen Mirren; Gosford Park	Jennifer Connelly; A Beautiful Mind
Best Screenplay, Adapted	Christopher Nolan; Memento	Akiva Goldsman; A Beautiful Mind		Ted Elliott, Terry Rossio, Joe Stillman and Roger S. H. Schulman; Shrek	Akiva Goldsman; A Beautiful Mind	
Best Screenplay, Original	Christopher Nolan; Memento	Akiva Goldsman; A Beautiful Mind		Guillaume Laurant and Jean-Pierre Jeunet; Amélie	Julian Fellowes; Gosford Park	
Best Animated Film	Shrek	N/A	N/A	N/A	N/A	Shrek
Best Original Score	The Lord of the Rings: The Fellowship of the Ring; Howard Shore	Moulin Rouge! Craig Armstrong			N/A	The Lord of the Rings: The Fellowship of the Ring; Howard Shore
Best Original Song	"May It Be"; The Lord of the Rings: The Fellowship of the Ring	"Until..."; Kate & Leopold		N/A	N/A	"If I Didn't Have You"; Monsters, Inc.
Best Foreign Language Film	Amélie	No Man's Land		Love's a Bitch	N/A	No Man's Land

Palme d'Or (54th Cannes Film Festival):

The Son's Room (La stanza del figlio), directed by Nanni Moretti, Italy

Golden Lion (58th Venice International Film Festival):

Monsoon Wedding, directed by Mira Nair, India

Golden Bear (51st Berlin International Film Festival):

Intimacy, directed by Patrice Chéreau, France

== 2001 films ==
=== By country/region ===
- List of American films of 2001
- List of Argentine films of 2001
- List of Australian films of 2001
- List of Bangladeshi films of 2001
- List of British films of 2001
- List of Canadian films of 2001
- List of Chinese films of 2001
- List of French films of 2001
- List of Hong Kong films of 2001
- List of Indian films of 2001
  - List of Bengali films of 2001
  - List of Hindi films of 2001
  - List of Kannada films of 2001
  - List of Malayalam films of 2001
  - List of Marathi films of 2001
  - List of Punjabi films of 2001
  - List of Tamil films of 2001
  - List of Telugu films of 2001
- List of Japanese films of 2001
- List of Mexican films of 2001
- List of Nepalese films of 2001
- List of Pakistani films of 2001
- List of Russian films of 2001
- List of South Korean films of 2001
- List of Spanish films of 2001

=== By genre/medium ===
- List of action films of 2001
- List of animated feature films of 2001
- List of avant-garde films of 2001
- List of crime films of 2001
- List of comedy films of 2001
- List of drama films of 2001
- List of horror films of 2001
- List of science fiction films of 2001
- List of thriller films of 2001
- List of western films of 2001

== Births ==
- January 1
  - Angourie Rice, Australian actress
  - Carla Tous, Spanish actress
- January 15 - Ethan Josh Lee, American actor
- February 6 – Gabriel G. Mourreau, Spanish actor
- February 15 – Haley Tju, American actress
- February 16 - Chloe East, American actress
- February 19 – David Mazouz, American actor
- February 24
  - Matthew Broome, English actor
  - Ramona Marquez, English actress
- March 3 – Inde Navarrette, American actress
- March 6 – Milo Manheim, American actor
- March 25 – Daisy Tahan, American actress
- March 31 - Maeve Courtier-Lilley, Welsh actress
- April 10 – Noa Kirel, Israeli actress
- April 20 – Ian Alexander, American actor
- April 28 – Madeleine Harris, British actress
- May 3 – Rachel Zegler, American actress
- May 5 – Jang Da-ah, South Korean actress
- May 23 – Matt Lintz, American actor
- May 27 – Izabela Vidovic, American actress
- June 1 – Ed Oxenbould, Australian actor
- June 3 – Rhea Norwood, English actress
- June 5 - Lilly Krug, German actress
- June 9 – Xolo Maridueña, American actor
- June 14 – Samuel Bottomley, English actor
- June 16 – William Sorenson, Canadian Representative
- June 21 – Eleanor Worthington Cox, English actress
- July 1 – Chosen Jacobs, American actor
- July 2 – Abraham Attah, Ghanaian actor
- July 10 – Isabela Merced, American actress
- July 11 – Sophia Anne Caruso, American actress
- July 16 – Tom Taylor, English actor
- July 22 – Alisha Newton, Canadian actress
- July 31 – Sean Michael Kyer, Canadian actor
- August 5 – Josie Totah, American actress
- August 6 – Ty Simpkins, American actor
- August 21
  - Dallas Liu, American actor
  - Harry Gilby, English actor
- August 31 – Garrett Wareing, American actor
- August 31 Corey Maison Transgender activist OF Model
- September 3 – Kaia Gerber, American actress and model
- September 6
  - Freya Allan, English actress
  - Nuno Gallego, Spanish actor
- September 11 - Mackenzie Aladjem, American actress
- September 14 – Matías Recalt, Argentine actor
- September 15 – Emma Fuhrmann, American actress
- September 17 – India Amarteifio, English actress
- September 19
  - Jack Downham, British actor
  - D'Pharaoh Woon-A-Tai, Canadian actor
- September 29 – William Healy, Canadian actor
- October 1 – Luna Blaise, American actress
- October 5 – Dalila Bela, Canadian actress
- October 8 – Percy Hynes White, Canadian actor
- October 9 – Louis Hynes, English actor
- October 10 – Blake Cooper, American actor
- October 12 – Raymond Ochoa, American actor and musician
- October 13 – Caleb McLaughlin, American actor
- October 14 – Rowan Blanchard, American actress
- October 19 - Art Parkinson, Irish actor
- October 21 – Ashley Liao, American actress
- October 23 – Mina Sundwall, American actress
- October 27 – Lukita Maxwell, Indonesian-American actress
- November 7
  - Noah Lomax, American actor
  - Amybeth McNulty, Irish-Canadian actress
- November 12 – Raffey Cassidy, English actress
- November 15 – Sadie Stanley, American actress
- November 25 - Alex Bain, British actor
- November 27 – Morgan Davies, Australian actor
- December 12 - Britain Dalton, American actor
- December 13 – Harley Bird, English actress
- December 14 – Joshua Rush, American actor
- December 16 – Sebastian Croft, English actor
- December 22 - Lily Laight, English actress and singer
- December 28 – Maitreyi Ramakrishnan, Canadian actress

== Deaths ==
Month	Date	Name	Age	Country	Profession	Notable films
January	1	Ray Walston	86	US	Actor	Fast Times at Ridgemont High; The Sting
January	5	Nancy Parsons	58	US	Actress	Porky's; Steel Magnolias
January	10	Jacques Marin	81	France	Actor	Marathon Man; Charade
January	11	James Hill	84	US	Producer, Screenwriter	Sweet Smell of Success; Separate Tables
January	11	Michael Williams	65	UK	Actor	Henry V; Educating Rita
January	15	Ted Mann	84	US	Producer	Krull; Brubaker
January	15	Rempo Urip	86	Indonesia	Director	Rodrigo de Villa; Supir Istimewa
January	16	Virginia O'Brien	81	US	Actress, Singer	Ship Ahoy; The Harvey Girls
January	18	Al Waxman	65	Canada	Actor	The Hurricane; Heavy Metal
January	21	Sandy Baron	64	US	Actor	Sweet November; Broadway Danny Rose
January	21	Joseph O'Conor	84	Ireland	Actor	Oliver!; Elizabeth
January	30	Jean-Pierre Aumont	90	France	Actor	Day for Night; Jefferson in Paris
January	30	John Prebble	85	UK	Screenwriter	Zulu; Mysterious Island
January	31	Bert Williams	78	US	Actor	The Usual Suspects; Cobra
February	4	Tony Steedman	73	UK	Actor	Bill & Ted's Excellent Adventure; Scrooged
February	7	Dale Evans	88	US	Actress, Singer	Bells of San Angelo; In Old Oklahoma
February	10	Lewis Arquette	65	US	Actor	Scream 2; Tango & Cash
February	11	Sy Gomberg	82	US	Screenwriter	When Willie Comes Marching Home; Summer Stock
February	14	Charles B. Fitzsimons	76	Ireland	Producer	The Quiet Man; Batman
February	15	Burt Kennedy	78	US	Director, Screenwriter	Young Billy Young; The Rounders
February	16	Howard W. Koch	84	US	Producer	Airplane!; The Odd Couple
February	19	Stanley Kramer	87	US	Director, Producer	Judgment at Nuremberg; Guess Who's Coming to Dinner
February	20	Rosemary DeCamp	90	US	Actress	Yankee Doodle Dandy; 13 Ghosts
February	27	Ralf D. Bode	59	Germany	Cinematographer	Coal Miner's Daughter; Dressed to Kill
February	27	Stan Margulies	80	US	Producer	Willy Wonka & the Chocolate Factory; Those Magnificent Men in Their Flying Machines
March	6	Kim Walker	32	US	Actress	Say Anything...; Heathers
March	8	Edward Winter	63	US	Actor	The Parallax View; From the Hip
March	9	Richard Stone	47	US	Composer, Music Editor	Platoon; Ferris Bueller's Day Off
March	12	Morton Downey Jr.	68	US	Actor	Predator 2; The Silencer
March	13	John A. Alonzo	66	US	Cinematographer, Actor	Scarface; Chinatown
March	15	Ann Sothern	92	US	Actress	A Letter to Three Wives; The Whales of August
March	16	Norma MacMillan	79	Canada	Actress	Head over Heels; Big Bully
March	17	Ralph Thomas	85	UK	Director	Doctor in the House; The Iron Petticoat
March	19	Mentor Huebner	79	US	Illustrator	Blade Runner; Dune
March	21	Anthony Steel	80	UK	Actor	Where No Vultures Fly; The Wooden Horse
March	22	William Hanna	90	US	Animator, Director, Producer	The Man Called Flintstone; Jetsons: The Movie
March	23	Sully Boyar	77	US	Actor	Dog Day Afternoon; Prizzi's Honor
March	24	Tambi Larsen	86	India	Art Director	Hud; Thunderbolt and Lightfoot
March	26	Piotr Sobociński	43	Poland	Cinematographer	Three Colors: Red; Ransom
April	1	Larry Tucker	66	US	Screenwriter	Bob & Carol & Ted & Alice; I Love You, Alice B. Toklas
April	7	David Graf	50	US	Actor	Police Academy; The Brady Bunch Movie
April	7	Beatrice Straight	86	US	Actress	Network; Poltergeist
April	10	Nyree Dawn Porter	65	New Zealand	Actress	Hilary and Jackie; The House That Dripped Blood
April	11	Harry Secombe	79	UK	Actor	Oliver!; Song of Norway
April	13	Jimmy Logan	73	UK	Actor	Mary Poppins; Notorious
April	13	Ken Weston	53	UK	Sound Engineer	Gladiator; The Shining
April	14	Hiroshi Teshigahara	74	Japan	Director	Woman in the Dunes; Pitfall
April	16	Michael Ritchie	62	US	Director	Fletch; The Bad News Bears
April	20	Maria Karnilova	80	US	Actress	The Unsinkable Molly Brown; Married to the Mob
April	21	Jack Haley Jr.	67	US	Director	That's Entertainment!; The Love Machine
April	22	Edward Muhl	94	US	Studio Executive	
April	27	Jack Murdock	78	US	Actor	Rain Man; Altered States
April	28	Ken Hughes	79	UK	Director, Screenwriter	Chitty Chitty Bang Bang; Cromwell
April	29	Walter Hannemann	88	US	Film Editor	Smokey and the Bandit; Two-Minute Warning
May	2	Gina Mastrogiacomo	39	US	Actress	Goodfellas; Jungle Fever
May	3	Ernie Wheelwright	61	US	Actor	The Longest Yard; The Greatest
May	7	Gary Wissner	37	US	Production Designer, Art Director	Seven; I Know What You Did Last Summer
May	9	Leslie Sands	79	UK	Actor	The Deadly Affair; Another Man's Poison
May	10	Deborah Walley	59	US	Actress	Gidget Goes Hawaiian; Beach Blanket Bingo
May	12	Perry Como	88	US	Singer, Actor	Doll Face; If I'm Lucky
May	13	Eddra Gale	79	US	Actress	The Graduate; 8½
May	13	Jason Miller	62	US	Actor, Director	The Exorcist; Rudy
May	13	Ralph Tabakin	79	US	Actor	Good Morning, Vietnam; Sleepers
May	14	Mauro Bolognini	78	Italy	Director, Screenwriter	The Lovemakers; The Lady of the Camellias
May	14	Armando Nannuzzi	75	Italy	Cinematographer	La Cage aux Folles; The Damned
May	15	Sacha Vierny	81	France	Cinematographer	The Cook, the Thief, His Wife & Her Lover; Hiroshima mon amour
May	16	Joe Baker	72	UK	Actor	Dumb and Dumber; Bugsy
May	22	Connie Marshall	68	US	Actress	Sentimental Journey; Mr. Blandings Builds His Dream House
May	22	Whitman Mayo	70	US	Actor	Boyz n the Hood; The Main Event
May	22	Jack Watling	78	UK	Actor	A Night to Remember; Sink the Bismarck!
May	23	Lita Chevret	92	US	Actress	The Pay-Off; Midnight Limited
May	25	John W. Holmes	84	US	Film Editor	Diamonds Are Forever; The Andromeda Strain
May	26	Anne Haney	67	US	Actress	Mrs. Doubtfire; Liar Liar
May	27	Ramon Bieri	71	US	Actor	Badlands; Sorcerer
May	29	Russell Saunders	82	US	Stuntman	The Goonies; Airplane!
May	31	Arlene Francis	93	US	Actress	One, Two, Three; The Thrill of It All
June	2	Imogene Coca	92	US	Actress	National Lampoon's Vacation; Under the Yum Yum Tree
June	3	Anthony Quinn	86	Mexico	Actor	Lawrence of Arabia; Zorba the Greek
June	4	Joan Vohs	73	US	Actress	Cry Vengeance; Sabrina
June	7	Leonard Tepper	61	US	Actor	Home Alone 2: Lost in New York; Awakenings
June	15	Henri Alekan	92	France	Cinematographer	Roman Holiday; Wings of Desire
June	21	Carroll O'Connor	76	US	Actor	Kelly's Heroes; Cleopatra
June	21	Vernon Sewell	97	UK	Director, Screenwriter	The Crimson Pirate; The Edge of the World
June	23	Corinne Calvet	76	France	Actress	Sailor Beware; On the Riviera
June	26	Paul Berry	40	UK	Animator	The Nightmare Before Christmas; James and the Giant Peach
June	27	Jack Lemmon	76	US	Actor	The Apartment; Some Like It Hot
June	28	Joan Sims	71	UK	Actress	Carry On; Trouble in Store
July	2	Jack Gwillim	91	UK	Actor	In Search of the Castaways; Clash of the Titans
July	3	Mordecai Richler	70	Canada	Screenwriter	The Apprenticeship of Duddy Kravitz; Fun with Dick and Jane
July	5	A. D. Flowers	84	US	Special Effects Artist	The Godfather; Tora! Tora! Tora!
July	7	Molly Lamont	91	South Africa	Actress	The Awful Truth; Scared to Death
July	12	James Bernard	75	UK	Composer	Nosferatu; Dracula
July	13	Eleanor Summerfield	80	UK	Actress	Scrooge; The Watcher in the Woods
July	15	Ted Berman	81	US	Director, Screenwriter, Animator	The Black Cauldron; The Fox and the Hound
July	19	Paul Beeson	79	UK	Cinematographer	Indiana Jones; Alien 3
July	21	Sivaji Ganesan	72	India	Actor	Parasakthi; Veerapandiya Kattabomman
July	29	Alex Nicol	85	US	Actor	The Man from Laramie; The Redhead from Wyoming
August	1	Joe Lynch	75	Ireland	Actor	Thumbelina; Young Cassidy
August	3	Christopher Hewett	79	UK	Actor	The Producers; Ratboy
August	6	Alan Rafkin	73	US	Director	The Ghost and Mr. Chicken; Angel in My Pocket
August	6	Dorothy Tutin	71	UK	Actress	The Importance of Being Earnest; A Tale of Two Cities
August	8	Harry Julian Fink	78	US	Screenwriter	Dirty Harry; Big Jake
August	14	Missy Cleveland	41	US	Actress	Blow Out; Cheech & Chong's Next Movie
August	14	Jackie "Butch" Jenkins	63	US	Actor	National Velvet; The Human Comedy
August	16	Dave Barry	82	US	Actor	Some Like It Hot; Spinout
August	18	Jack Elliott	74	US	Composer, Conductor	Oh, God!; Support Your Local Gunfighter
August	20	Kim Stanley	76	US	Actress	The Goddess; Séance on a Wet Afternoon
August	23	Kathleen Freeman	82	US	Actress	The Blues Brothers; Naked Gun 33 1/3: The Final Insult
August	25	Aaliyah	22	US	Actress, Singer	Romeo Must Die; Queen of the Damned
August	25	John Chambers	78	US	Makeup Artist	Blade Runner; Planet of the Apes
August	25	Jane Greer	76	US	Actress	Out of the Past; Desperate Search
August	25	Inigo Jackson	68	UK	Actor	The Trygon Factor; Twins of Evil
August	28	Lawrence B. Marcus	84	US	Screenwriter	The Stunt Man; Witness for the Prosecution
August	29	Francisco Rabal	75	Spain	Actor	Ten Ready Rifles; Sorcerer
August	30	Julie Bishop	87	US	Actress	Sands of Iwo Jima; The Black Cat
September	2	Troy Donahue	65	US	Actor	The Godfather Part II; A Summer Place
September	3	Ferruccio Amendola	71	Italy	Actor	The Great War; Everything Happens to Me
September	3	Pauline Kael	82	US	Film Critic	None; critiqued films for The New Yorker
September	3	Thuy Trang	27	US	Actress	Spy Hard; The Crow: City of Angels
September	4	Merrill Connally	80	US	Actor	Close Encounters of the Third Kind; The Sugarland Express
September	9	Tommy Hollis	47	US	Actor	Léon: The Professional; Ghostbusters
September	12	Victor Wong	74	US	Actor	The Last Emperor; Big Trouble in Little China
September	13	Barbara Matera	72	UK	Costume Designer	101 Dalmatians; The Addams Family
September	13	Dorothy McGuire	85	US	Actress	Gentleman's Agreement; Old Yeller
September	15	Fred de Cordova	90	US	Director	Bedtime for Bonzo; I'll Take Sweden
September	16	Samuel Z. Arkoff	83	US	Producer	The Amityville Horror; Beach Blanket Bingo
September	25	Evan A. Lottman	70	US	Film Editor	The Exorcist; Sophie's Choice
September	25	Dolores Michaels	68	US	Actress	The Wayward Bus; Warlock
September	26	Hannes Nikel	70	Germany	Film Editor	Das Boot; Stalingrad
September	27	Helen Cherry	85	UK	Actress	Castle in the Air; His Excellency
September	28	Martin Garner	74	US	Actor	Twilight Zone: The Movie; Chances Are
September	29	Gloria Foster	67	US	Actress	The Matrix; Leonard Part 6
October	9	Herbert Ross	74	US	Director	Footloose; The Turning Point
October	15	Robert Rutledge	53	US	Sound Engineer	Star Wars; Back to the Future
October	17	Jay Livingston	86	US	Composer	The Man Who Knew Too Much; The Paleface
October	19	Ray Lovejoy	62	UK	Film Editor	Aliens; 2001: A Space Odyssey
October	21	David Lowell Rich	81	US	Director	The Plainsman; Madame X
October	23	Linden Travers	88	UK	Actress	The Lady Vanishes; No Orchids for Miss Blandish
October	24	Jaromil Jireš	65	Slovakia	Director	The Cry; The Joke
October	26	Eugene Jackson	84	US	Actor	Escape from Alcatraz; Cimarron
October	28	Larry Jost	80	US	Sound Engineer	Chinatown; One Flew Over the Cuckoo's Nest
October	29	Maura Fay	43	Australia	Casting Director	Star Wars: Episode II – Attack of the Clones; Darkness Falls
October	31	Jenny Laird	89	UK	Actress	Village of the Damned; Black Narcissus
November	5	Roy Boulting	87	UK	Director	Run for the Sun; There's a Girl in My Soup
November	6	Anthony Shaffer	75	UK	Screenwriter	Death on the Nile; Sleuth
November	7	Bobby Bass	65	US	Stuntman, Actor	Die Hard; Scarface
November	12	Albert Hague	82	Germany	Actor	Fame; Space Jam
November	13	Peggy Mount	86	UK	Actress	Oliver!; The Naked Truth
November	14	Charlotte Coleman	33	UK	Actress	Four Weddings and a Funeral; The Revengers' Comedies
November	21	Ralph Burns	79	US	Composer, Arranger	Cabaret; All That Jazz
November	29	Budd Boetticher	85	US	Director	The Tall T; Buchanan Rides Alone
November	29	George Harrison	58	UK	Singer, Actor, Producer	A Hard Day's Night; Help!
November	29	John Mitchum	82	US	Actor	Dirty Harry; The Outlaw Josey Wales
December	1	Danilo Donati	74	Italy	Costume Designer, Production Designer	Life Is Beautiful; Flash Gordon
December	6	Walt Mulconery	69	US	Film Editor	The Karate Kid; Flashdance
December	7	Pauline Moore	87	US	Actress	The Three Musketeers; Colorado
December	10	Lance Fuller	73	US	Actor	Frontier Woman; God's Little Acre
December	15	Wilkie Cooper	90	UK	Cinematographer	Jason and the Argonauts; Land Raiders
December	16	Roy Brocksmith	56	US	Actor	Total Recall; Scrooged
December	20	Foster Brooks	89	US	Actor	Cannonball Run II; The Villain
December	20	Edward Evans	87	UK	Actor	10 Rillington Place; Lifeforce
December	26	Nigel Hawthorne	72	UK	Actor	Amistad; The Madness of King George
December	29	Robert Patten	76	US	Actor	Twelve O'Clock High; Airport
December	30	Ray Patterson	90	US	Animator	Dumbo; Charlotte's Web
December	31	Eileen Heckart	82	US	Actress	Heartbreak Ridge; Butterflies Are Free
December	31	David Swift	82	US	Director	The Parent Trap; How to Succeed in Business Without Really Trying

== Film debuts ==
- Scott Adkins – The Accidental Spy
- Laz Alonso – 30 Years to Life
- Malena Alterio – The Hold-Up
- Morena Baccarin – Perfume
- Ike Barinholtz – Down
- Conan O'Brien – Storytelling
- Ty Burrell – Evolution
- Luis Callejo – Luna's Game
- Henry Cavill – Laguna
- Jeff Chase – In the Shadows
- Justin Chatwin – Josie and the Pussycats
- Aina Clotet – Anita Takes a Chance
- Bradley Cooper – Wet Hot American Summer
- Dominic Cooper – From Hell
- Michael Ealy – Kissing Jessica Stein
- Marta Etura – No Shame
- Dakota Fanning – Tomcats
- Elle Fanning – I Am Sam
- Megan Fox – Holiday in the Sun
- Kyle Gallner – Wet Hot American Summer
- Tyrese Gibson – Baby Boy
- Macarena Gómez – Dagon
- Tom Hardy – Black Hawk Down
- Sean Harris – The Discovery of Heaven
- Naomie Harris – Crust
- Anne Hathaway – The Princess Diaries
- Freddie Highmore – Women Talking Dirty
- Dwayne Johnson – The Mummy Returns
- Jaime King – Happy Campers
- Luke Kirby – Lost and Delirious
- Fran Kranz – Donnie Darko
- Brie Larson – Madison
- Bárbara Lennie – No Pain, No Gain
- Ludacris – The Wash
- Scoot McNairy – Wrong Numbers
- Sienna Miller – South Kensington
- Michelle Monaghan – Perfume
- Ebon Moss-Bachrach – The Believer
- Eric Christian Olsen – Pearl Harbor
- David Oyelowo – Dog Eat Dog
- Daniel Radcliffe – The Tailor of Panama
- James Ransone – The American Astronaut
- Elizabeth Reaser – The Believer
- Emma Roberts – Blow
- Seth Rogen – Donnie Darko
- Theo Rossi – The Myersons
- Kristen Schaal – Kate & Leopold
- Pablo Schreiber – Bubble Boy
- Rafe Spall – Beginner's Luck
- Britney Spears – Longshot
- Omar Sy – La Tour Montparnasse Infernale
- Jasmine Trinca – The Son's Room
- Gaspard Ulliel – Brotherhood of the Wolf
- Wilmer Valderrama – Summer Catch
- Katheryn Winnick – Biohazardous
- Benedict Wong – Kiss Kiss (Bang Bang)
