= Deaths in June 2001 =

The following is a list of notable deaths in June 2001.

Entries for each day are listed alphabetically by surname. A typical entry lists information in the following sequence:

- Name, age, country of citizenship at birth, subsequent country of citizenship (if applicable), reason for notability, cause of death (if known), and reference.

== June 2001 ==
=== 1 ===
- Peter Corr, 77, Irish footballer, Alzheimer's disease.
- Nkosi Johnson, 12, South African AIDS awareness campaigner, AIDS.
- Hank Ketcham, 81, American cartoonist (Dennis the Menace), prostate cancer.
- Abe Silverstein, 92, American aerospace engineer.
- Nancy Warren, 79, American baseball player.
- Victims of the Nepalese royal massacre
  - King Birendra, 55, King of Nepal
  - Queen Aishwarya, 51, Queen of Nepal
  - Prince Nirajan, 22, son of Birendra and Aishwarya
  - Princess Shruti, 24, daughter of Birendra and Aishwarya
  - Prince Dhirendra, 51, brother of King Birendra
  - Princess Shanti, 60, sister of King Birendra
  - Princess Sharada, 59, sister of King Birendra
  - Princess Jayanti, 54, cousin of King Birendra

=== 2 ===
- Jim Bragan, 72, American baseball player, manager, and scout.
- Imogene Coca, 92, American actress (Your Show of Shows), Alzheimer's disease.
- John T. Fesperman, 76, American conductor, organist and author.
- Kenneth Hayr, 66, British air marshal, plane crash at the 2001 Biggin Hill air show.
- Joey Maxim, 79, American light heavyweight boxing champion.
- Viktor Popkov, 54, Russian dissident, human rights activist and journalist, shot in an ambush.
- Pilar Seurat, 62, Filipino American film and television actress, lung cancer.
- Frank Stagg, 89, American Southern Baptist theologian and author.
- Adolf Thiel, 86, Austrian-German rocket scientist.
- Gene Woodling, 78, American baseball player.

=== 3 ===
- Humayun Abdulali, 87, Indian ornithologist and biologist.
- Nicholas Albery, 52, British social inventor and author, car accident.
- Maurice Breton, 91, Canadian politician, member of the House of Commons of Canada (1950-1958).
- J. C. Furnas, 95, American writer and social historian.
- Otto Hemele, 75, Czech football player.
- Jamake Highwater, 70, American writer and journalist, heart attack.
- Andrea Prader, 81, Swiss scientist, physician, and pediatric endocrinologist.
- Anthony Quinn, 86, Mexican-born American actor (The Guns of Navarone, Zorba the Greek, Lawrence of Arabia), Oscar winner (1953, 1957), pneumonia.
- Friedl Rinder, 95, German chess master.
- Nino Valdez, 76, Cuban heavyweight boxing champion.

=== 4 ===
- Warren Alfson, 86, American football player (Brooklyn Dodgers).
- Simone Benmussa, 69, French-Algerian author and theatre director, cancer.
- John Corriden, 83, American baseball player (Brooklyn Dodgers).
- John Hartford, 63, American musician and composer ("Gentle on My Mind"), lymphoma.
- Chenjerai Hunzvi, 51, Zimbabwean politician, AIDS.
- Dinos Iliopoulos, 85, Greek actor, cardiac arrest.
- Lu Jiaxi, 85, Chinese physical chemist.
- Felicitas Kukuck, 86, German music educator and composer of opera and other works.
- Dipendra of Nepal, 29, Nepalese monarch and mass murderer, King of Nepal, perpetrator of the Nepalese royal massacre, suicide by gunshot.
- Darshan Ranganathan, 60, Indian organic chemist, breast cancer.
- Ruth Sanger, 82, Australian immunogeneticist, haematologist and serologist.
- Horst Tüller, 70, German Olympic road and track cyclist (1956).
- Joan Vohs, 73, American model and actress (Fort Ti, Fireside Theater, Maverick, Perry Mason, Family Affair), heart failure.

=== 5 ===
- Pedro Laín Entralgo, 93, Spanish medical historian.
- Dennis Gillespie, 65, Scottish footballer.
- Aaron Green, 84, American architect.
- Howard Earl Johnston, 72, Canadian member of Parliament (House of Commons).
- Anders Melin, 79, Swedish Olympic long-distance runner (1948).
- L. Fletcher Prouty, 84, American Chief of Special Operations for the Joint Chiefs of Staff, organ failure following stomach surgery.

=== 6 ===
- Alfonso Brescia, 71, Italian film director.
- Marie Brémont, 115, French supercentenarian and the oldest recognized person in the world.
- José Manuel Castañón, 81, Spanish writer.
- Louis Desmet, 71, Belgian Olympic middle-distance runner (1952).
- Ford Garrison, 85, American baseball player (Boston Red Sox, Philadelphia Athletics).
- Douglas Lilburn, 85, New Zealand composer.
- Juan Parker, 83, Argentine Olympic rower (1948).
- Ami Priyono, 61, Indonesian film director and actor.
- Emmy Putzinger, 80, Austrian figure skater and Olympian (1936).
- Suzanne Schiffman, 71, French film director and screenwriter, cancer.
- Lyubov Sokolova, 79, Soviet/Russian film actress, heart attack.

=== 7 ===
- Franco Balducci, 78, Italian film actor.
- Víctor Paz Estenssoro, 93, Bolivian politician and four-term President of Bolivia, complications from blood clot surgery.
- Carole Fredericks, 49, American singer, heart attack.
- Ken Green, 77, English footballer.
- Boris Lavrenko, 81, Russian painter.
- Betty Neels, 91, British novelist.
- Athol Stewart, 82, Australian rugby league footballer.
- Charles Templeton, 85, Canadian cartoonist, broadcaster and writer, Alzheimer's disease.
- Horace Walker, 64, American NBA Basketball player (Chicago Packers).

=== 8 ===
- Toy Bolton, 74, American racing driver.
- Sam Boyd, 86, American football player (Pittsburgh Pirates/Steelers) and coach.
- Alex de Renzy, 65, American director and producer of pornographic movies, cerebrovascular disease.
- Lucien Lauk, 89, French racing cyclist.
- Duncan MacIntyre, 85, New Zealand politician.
- Kotayya Pratyagatma, 75, Indian film journalist, director and producer.
- Dennis Puleston, 95, British-American environmentalist, adventurer and designer.
- Nathaniel Rochester, 82, American computer scientist.
- Don Roper, 78, English footballer.
- Arnold Thomsen, 88, Danish Olympic gymnast (1948).
- Harry Watson, 79, American child actor and television journalism pioneer.

=== 9 ===
- Ronnie Allen, 72, English football player and manager, Alzheimer's disease.
- Malcolm Cooper, 53, British sport shooter and Olympian (1972, 1976, 1984, 1988), brain cancer.
- Richard T. Hanna, 87, American politician (U.S. Representative for California's 34th congressional district), (Koreagate).
- Savva Kulish, 64, Soviet film director and screenwriter, cerebrovascular disease.
- Yaltah Menuhin, 79, American-British pianist, artist and poet.
- Deirdre O'Connell, 61, Irish American actress, singer, and theatre director, cancer.
- Branko Pleša, 75, Serbian actor and theatre director.

=== 10 ===
- Kristinn Gunnlaugsson, 66, Icelandic footballer.
- Joyce King, 80, Australian sprinter and Olympic silver medalist (1948).
- Jochen Liedtke, 48, German computer scientist.
- John McKay, 77, American football assistant coach (Oregon Ducks) and head coach (USC Trojans, Tampa Bay Buccaneers), diabetes.
- Mike Mentzer, 49, American bodybuilder, complications from IgA nephropathy.
- Leila Pahlavi, 31, Iranian Princess and daughter of the Shah of Iran, suicide.
- Alexander Zuyev, 39, Soviet pilot who defected to the US, plane crash.

=== 11 ===
- Lincoln Constance, 92, American botanist.
- Pierre Eyt, 67, French Cardinal of the Roman Catholic Church, cancer.
- Cootje van Kampen-Tonneman, 79, Dutch Olympic gymnast (1948, 1952).
- Lou Lombardo, 72, American baseball player (New York Giants).
- Trevor Madondo, 24, Zimbabwean cricket player, malaria.
- Timothy McVeigh, 33, American convicted terrorist (Oklahoma City bombing), execution by lethal injection.
- Amalia Mendoza, 77, Mexican singer ("Échame a mi la culpa", "Amarga navidad"), lung disease.
- John Elvin Shaffner, 90, Canadian businessman and political figure.

=== 12 ===
- Carl-Axel Acking, 91, Swedish architect, author and furniture designer.
- Joseph Brady, 72, Scottish actor.
- Owen Bush, 79, American television announcer and actor.
- Peggy Cartwright, 88, Canadian silent film actress.
- W. D. Davies, 89-90, Welsh congregationalist minister and theologian.
- Viktor Hamburger, 100, German embryologist.
- Antoine Latorre, 85, French cyclist.
- Ray Mentzer, 47, American bodybuilder, kidney failure from Berger's disease.
- Nkem Nwankwo, 65, Nigerian novelist and poet, complications from a heart imbalance.
- Jim Seminoff, 78, American basketball player (Chicago Stags, Boston Celtics).
- Joseph W. Twinam, 66, American diplomat, injuries from a fall.
- Paula Wiesinger, 94, Italian Olympic alpine skier (1936), and mountain climber.
- Thomas Wilson, 73, Scottish composer.

=== 13 ===
- Gordon Christie, 86, New Zealand politician.
- Felle Delgado, 87, American baseball player.
- Marcelo Fromer, 39, Brazilian rock musician, traffic accident.
- Luise Krüger, 86, German athlete and Olympic silver medalist (1936).
- Makanda Ken McIntyre, 69, American jazz musician and composer, heart attack.
- Juan Poll, 74, Spanish Olympic alpine skier (1948, 1956).
- Yoshishige Saitō, 97, Japanese visual artist and art educator.
- David Spedding, 58, British intelligence officer, Chief of the Secret Intelligence Service (1994–1999), lung cancer.
- Rajzel Zychlinski, 90, Polish poet.

=== 14 ===
- Paul Carey, 38, American civil servant, pheochromocytoma.
- Oleg Fedoseyev, 65, Soviet Olympic long jump and triple jump athlete (1956, 1964).
- Miroslav Marcovich, 82, Serbian-American philologist.
- Gerry Melnyk, 66, Canadian ice hockey player (Detroit Red Wings, Chicago Black Hawks, St. Louis Blues).
- Jay D. Scott, 48, American convicted murderer, execution by lethal injection.
- Horace M. Wade, 85, American Air Force general.

=== 15 ===
- Henri Alekan, 92, French cinematographer, leukaemia.
- Mikhail Gluzsky, 82, Soviet/Russian actor, heart attack.
- Leif Kayser, 82, Danish composer and organist.
- Jay Moriarity, 22, American surfer, drowned.
- Thomas S. Noonan, 63, American historian and anthropologist, cancer.
- Marcelino Solis, 70, Mexican baseball player (Chicago Cubs).
- Joe Taylor, 61, American football player (Chicago Bears).

=== 16 ===
- Joe Darion, 84, American musical theatre lyricist (two-time Tony Award winner for Man of La Mancha: Tony Award for Best Musical, Tony Award for Best Original Score).
- Alessandro Faedo, 87, Italian mathematician and politician.
- Marta Hillers, 90, German journalist and author.
- Wally Hood, 75, American baseball player (New York Yankees).
- Sam Jethroe, 84, American baseball player (Boston Braves, Pittsburgh Pirates), heart attack.
- Jay Rabinowitz, 74, American lawyer and jurist, complications of leukemia.
- Jean-Maurice Simard, 69, Canadian Chartered Accountant and politician.
- Sava Vuković, 71, Serbian Orthodox bishop.
- Arthur Wheeler, 85, British motorcyclist.

=== 17 ===
- Diana Bellamy, 57, American actress (Superhuman Samurai Syber-Squad, Outbreak, Popular), cancer.
- John Broderick, 58, American film director, producer and screenwriter, kidney failure.
- Donald J. Cram, 82, American chemist and co-winner of Nobel Prize in Chemistry in 1987, cancer.
- Ninfa Laurenzo, 77, American restaurateur, bone cancer.
- Thomas Winning, 76, Scottish Roman Catholic cardinal, heart attack.
- Mohammad Yunus, 84, Indian diplomat.

=== 18 ===
- Allan Burdon, 86, Australian politician.
- Janine Crispin, 89, French film and television actress.
- René Dumont, 97, French engineer, sociologist, and politician.
- Dame Rosamund Holland-Martin, 86, British social welfare official and head of the NSPCC, heart disease.
- Gao Kelin, 94, Chinese politician.
- Davorin Popović, 54, Bosnian singer-songwriter, pancreatic cancer.
- Paolo Emilio Taviani, 88, Italian politician, economist and historian.
- Karl Friedrich Titho, 90, German SS officer and war criminal during WorldWar II.

=== 19 ===
- Sargis Baghdasaryan, 77, Soviet Armenian sculptor.
- Lindsay L. Cooper, 61, Scottish musician.
- Jerry Cornes, 91, British athlete and Olympic silver medallist (1932, 1936).
- William Austin Forsyth, 83, Canadian politician.
- Juan Garza, 44, American murderer and drug trafficker, execution by lethal injection.
- John Heyer, 84, Australian documentary filmmaker (The Back of Beyond).
- Ludwig Hörmann, 82, German cyclist.
- Tom Keane, 74, American gridiron football player.
- Robert Klippel, 81, Australian sculptor.
- Sergio Litvak, 73, Chilean football goalkeeper and Olympian (1952).
- Col Maxwell, 83, Australian rugby league player.
- Lee Mishkin, 74, American animator and director, heart failure.
- Stanley Mosk, 88, American jurist, politician, and attorney.
- Brian O'Shaughnessy, 70, British-South African film actor.
- C. R. Pattabhiraman, 94, Indian lawyer and politician.
- Jandhyala Subramanya Sastry, 50, Indian screenwriter, director and actor, heart attack.
- David Sylvester, 76, British art critic.
- Eddie Vartan, 63, French musician, bandleader, arranger, and record producer, cerebral haemorrhage.

=== 20 ===
- Ernest Bour, 88, French conductor.
- Geoff Brown, 77, Australian tennis player.
- Angela Browne, 63, British actress (Ghost Squad, The Avengers, The Prisoner, Upstairs, Downstairs, The Adventures of Sherlock Holmes).
- Tom Burns, 88, English sociologist and author.
- Bob Keegan, 80, American baseball player (Chicago White Sox).
- Bert Kramer, 66, American actor (Kojak, The Bionic Woman, The Rockford Files, Dallas, Dynasty, Matlock), melanoma.
- Patrick F. McDonough, Irish-American police officer, attorney, and politician.
- Zygmunt Pawlas, 70, Polish fencer and Olympic silver medalist (1952, 1956).
- Massimo Pirri, 55, Italian film director and screenwriter.
- Frederick Russell, 77, Canadian businessman and lieutenant governor of Newfoundland.
- Viktor Zsuffka, 90, Hungarian athlete and Olympian (1936).

=== 21 ===
- John Lee Hooker, 83, American blues singer, songwriter and guitarist ("Boogie Chillen'", "Boom Boom", "Dimples").
- Soad Hosny, 58, Egyptian actress ("Cinderella of Egyptian cinema"), fall.
- Károly Janza, 87, Hungarian military officer and politician.
- François Lesure, 78, French librarian and musicologist.
- K. V. Mahadevan, 83, Indian singer-songwriter, music producer, and musician.
- Carroll O'Connor, 76, American actor (All in the Family, In the Heat of the Night, Cleopatra), five-time Emmy winner, heart attack brought on by diabetes complications.
- Vernon Sewell, 97, British film director.

=== 22 ===
- Mario Agüero, 77, Cuban Olympic basketball player (1948).
- Arbi Barayev, 27, Chechen warlord and terrorist, killed in action.
- Luis Carniglia, 83, Argentine footballer and manager.
- George Evans, 81, American comic book and comic strip cartoonist and illustrator.
- John Herbert, 74, Canadian playwright (Fortune and Men's Eyes).
- Manuel Ledesma, 80, Chilean Olympic basketball player (1948).
- Wendell L. Minckley, 65, American ichthyologist and academic, complications of cancer treatment.
- Henri van Osch, 56, Dutch Olympic swimmer (1964).
- George Westwell, 70, Maltese anglican priest.
- Lika Yanko, 73, Bulgarian artist, pneumonia.

=== 23 ===
- Odd Abrahamsen, 77, Norwegian poet.
- Corinne Calvet, 76, French actress (What Price Glory?, Sailor Beware, So This Is Paris, On the Riviera), intracerebral hemorrhage.
- Panteley Dimitrov, 60, Bulgarian footballer.
- Yvonne Dionne, 67, Canadian quintuplet (first known quintuplets to have survived their infancy).

=== 24 ===
- Muhammad Bashir, 66, Pakistani wrestler and Olympian (1960, 1964).
- Antonio Ber Ciani, 93, Argentine actor and film director.
- Onni Hynninen, 90, Finnish sports shooter and Olympian (1948).
- Robert M. McKinney, 90, American news editor and diplomat, pneumonia.
- Avadhanam Sita Raman, 82, Indian writer and journalist.
- Nicola Ann Raphael, 15, Scottish schoolgirl and bullying victim, suicide by drug overdose.
- Milton Santos, 75, Brazilian geographer, prostate cancer.
- William H. Sewell, 91, American sociologist.

=== 25 ===
- Miloslav Charouzd, 72, Czech Olympic ice hockey player (1952).
- Hans Dürst, 79, Swiss Olympic ice hockey player (1948).
- Hasan Gemici, 74, Turkish sports wrestler and trainer and Olympic champion (1952), chronic kidney failure.
- Ken La Grange, 78, South African Olympic boxer (1948).
- Gabriel Hernández, 27, Dominican Olympic boxer (1996), suicide by hanging.
- Kurt Hoffmann, 90, German film director and son of Carl Hoffmann.
- Frederick C. Langone, American politician.
- John LeRoy, 26, American baseball player (Atlanta Braves), heart attack and brain aneurysm.
- George Senesky, 79, American basketball player (Philadelphia Warriors), and coach, cancer.
- Ivan Telesmanić, 81, Croatian Olympic rower (1948).
- Charles Sheldon Whitehouse, 79, American career diplomat, cancer.

=== 26 ===
- Darius Bea, 87, American baseball player.
- Paul Berry, 40, British animator (The Nightmare Before Christmas, James and the Giant Peach, Monkeybone), brain tumour.
- William Bryant, 77, American character actor (Escape from San Quentin, Experiment in Terror, How to Murder Your Wife, The Great Race).
- Gina Cigna, 101, French-Italian dramatic soprano.
- Günter Kaslowski, 66, German Olympic cyclist (1960).
- Margaret Kilgallen, 33, American visual artist, complications from breast cancer.
- Louis Klemantaski, 89, British photographer.
- Gopala Ramanujam, 86, Indian politician.
- Lalla Romano, 94, Italian novelist, poet, artist and journalist.
- Robert Smith, 88, American actor.
- Soccer, 13, American dog actor.
- Annika Tammela, 21, Estonian football player, bicycle accident.

=== 27 ===
- Sidney Buckwold, 84, Canadian politician and businessman.
- Hal Goldman, 81, American screenwriter, three Primetime Emmy Awards: The Jack Benny Program (1959, 1960), An Evening with Carol Channing (1966).
- Darrell Huff, 86, American statistician.
- Tove Jansson, 86, Finnish author, painter and comic strip artist, lung cancer.
- Jack Lemmon, 76, American actor (The Apartment, Some Like It Hot, Save the Tiger), Oscar winner (1956, 1974), bladder and colorectal cancer.
- Jorge Matias, 44, Portuguese Olympic equestrian (1992).
- Michael Moynihan, 84, Irish Labour Party politician.
- Chico O'Farrill, 79, Cuban composer, arranger, and conductor, complications from pneumonia.
- Udo Proksch, 67, Austrian industrialist and criminal, complications during heart surgery.
- Joan Sims, 71, British actress (Carry On Nurse, Carry On Cleo, Carry On Camping, On the Up, As Time Goes By), gastrointestinal system disease.
- Jukka Wuolio, 74, Finnish ice hockey player and Olympian (1952).
- Mahmoud Younes, 86, Egyptian fencer and Olympian (1948, 1952).

=== 28 ===
- Mortimer J. Adler, 98, American philosopher and author.
- José Castro, 86, Uruguayan Olympic water polo player (1936).
- Al Dempster, 89, American animator (Fantasia, Peter Pan, Sleeping Beauty).
- Ira Eisenstein, 94, American rabbi.
- Jim Ellis, 45, American computer scientist (Usenet), non-Hodgkin lymphoma.
- David Freeman, 80, American badminton player (multi-year U.S. Champion).
- Herbert McCabe, 74, English-Irish Dominican priest, theologian and philosopher.
- John Olsen, 72, Norwegian footballer.
- Thomas Ernst Josef Wiedemann, 51, German-British historian, cancer.

=== 29 ===
- Mary Barnes, 86, English artist and writer.
- Uno Berg, 92, Swedish Olympic sports shooter (1948, 1952).
- Manuel Echauri, 86, Mexican artist, liver cancer.
- Maurice Estève, 97, French painter.
- Maximos V Hakim, 93, Egyptian patriarch.
- Minoru Kawabata, 90, Japanese artist.
- Karen Lamm, 49, American film actress and producer, heart failure.
- Silvio Oddi, 90, Italian cardinal and Vatican diplomat.
- Thomas E. Sparks, 89, American politician.

=== 30 ===
- Stephen Ailes, 89, American lawyer and government official, stroke.
- Pol Appeltans, 79, Belgian footballer.
- Chet Atkins, 77, American country musician (14 Grammy Awards, Rock & Roll Hall of Fame), colorectal cancer.
- Giancarlo Brusati, 91, Italian fencer and Olympic champion (1936).
- Arcangelo Chiocchetti, 80, Italian Olympic cross-country skier (1948).
- Joe Fagan, 80, English football manager, cancer.
- Joe Henderson, 64, American jazz tenor saxophonist, emphysema.
- Lou Kusserow, 73, Canadian football player, complications from prostate cancer.
- Hussein Madkour, 81-82, Egyptian Olympic footballer (1948).
