= Deaths in April 2001 =

The following is a list of notable deaths in April 2001.

Entries for each day are listed alphabetically by surname. A typical entry lists information in the following sequence:

- Name, age, country of citizenship at birth, subsequent country of citizenship (if applicable), reason for notability, cause of death (if known), and reference.

== April 2001 ==
=== 1 ===
- Jean Anderson, 93, English actress (The Brothers, Tenko).
- Eugênio German, 70, Brazilian chess master and Brazilian chess champion (1951, 1972).
- Jayant Kothari, 71, Indian literary critic.
- Ted McCarty, 91, American businessman.
- Jo-Jo Moore, 92, American baseball player (New York Giants).
- Brendan O'Reilly, 71, Irish broadcaster.
- Aleksandar Obradović, 73, Serbian composer and academic.
- Jim Proudfoot, 67, Canadian sports journalist, natural causes.
- Valerie Scott, 83, English tennis player.
- Russ Smith, 56, American gridiron football player (San Diego Chargers).
- Trinh Cong Son, 62, Vietnamese musician and composer.
- Erik Styf, 68, Swedish ski jumper and Olympian (1956).
- Zellio Toppazzini, 71, Canadian ice hockey player (Boston Bruins, New York Rangers, Chicago Black Hawks).
- Larry Tucker, 66, American screenwriter (Bob & Carol & Ted & Alice), complications from multiple sclerosis and cancer.
- Jalil Zandi, 49, Iranian flying ace, car accident.

=== 2 ===
- Charles Daudelin, 80, French-Canadian sculptor and painter.
- Gary Gearhart, 77, American baseball player (New York Giants).
- François Gelhausen, 70, Luxembourgish racing cyclist.
- Andy Guest, 61, American politician, cancer.
- Pedro Mercado, 77, Argentine Olympic equestrian (1952).
- Carlos Carnes Ogden, Sr., 83, US Army officer and recipient of the Medal of Honor.
- Jennifer Syme, 28, American actress and record executive, traffic collision.

=== 3 ===
- Michael Berry, Baron Hartwell, 89, British newspaper proprietor.
- Louis Courtois, 63, French Olympic bobsledder (1968).
- Moïse Gorendiawé, 62, New Caledonian footballer.
- Dempster Jackson, 70, American Olympic rower (1952).
- Big Daddy Kinsey, 74, American Chicago blues singer, guitarist and harmonica player, prostate cancer.
- Jason Massey, 28, American convicted murderer, execution by lethal injection.
- Kersten Meier, 47, German swimmer and Olympian (1972), suicide by jumping.
- Butch Moore, 63, Irish singer and a showband icon, heart attack.
- Ray Osrin, 72, American comic book artist, complications from heart disease and diabetes.
- Paul Peek, 63, American rockabilly pioneer, cirrhosis.
- L. Richardson Preyer, 82, American judge and politician, cancer.
- Adela Reta, 79, Uruguayan lawyer and politician.

=== 4 ===
- Beryl Gilroy, 76, British pioneering teacher and novelist, heart attack.
- Wim van der Linden, 60, Dutch photographer and film and television director, heart attack.
- Ramón Mendoza, 73, Spanish lawyer and businessman.
- Mitra Mitrović, 88, Serbian politician, feminist and writer.
- José M. Dávila Monsanto, 95, Puerto Rican politician and lawyer.
- Liisi Oterma, 86, Finnish astronomer.
- Ed Roth, 69, American artist, cartoonist, and custom car designer and builder, heart attack.

=== 5 ===
- Benjy Dial, 57, American football player (Philadelphia Eagles).
- Kingsley Charles Dunham, 91, British geologist.
- Sonya Hedenbratt, 70, Swedish singer and actress.
- Jay Miller, 57, American basketball player, heart attack.
- John Bertram Oakes, 87, American journalist.
- Aldo Olivieri, 90, Italian football goalkeeper and manager.
- David Lloyd Owen, 83, British army general and writer.
- Malcolm Shepherd, 2nd Baron Shepherd, 82, British politician who served as Leader of the House of Lords.
- Brother Theodore, 94, German-American actor and comedian, pneumonia.

=== 6 ===
- Ingvar Bengtsson, 78, Swedish middle-distance runner and Olympian (1948).
- George Bull, 71, British journalist and writer.
- Heinz Eichholz, 74, German Olympic rower (1952).
- Danny Gaither, 62, American gospel singer (Bill Gaither Trio), lymphoma.
- Chaudhary Devi Lal, 85, Indian politician and Deputy Prime Minister of India.
- Yevgeny Malinin, 70, Soviet and Russian pianist.
- Eddie Melo, 40, Portuguese-born Canadian boxer and gangster, shot.
- Charles Pettigrew, 37, American singer, half of R&B duo Charles & Eddie, cancer.

=== 7 ===
- Francisco Furtado, 84, Brazilian Olympic rower (1952).
- David Graf, 50, American actor (Police Academy, The West Wing, Rules of Engagement), heart attack.
- Kurt Hohenemser, 95, German-born American aerospace engineer and a pioneer in helicopter design.
- Derek Lang, 87, British Army general.
- G. N. Ramachandran, 78, Indian physicist.
- Herbert Scholl, 75, German Olympic sailor (1960).
- Beatrice Straight, 86, American actress (Network, The Crucible, The Nun's Story), Oscar winner (1980), pneumonia.

=== 8 ===
- Kurt Almqvist, 89, Swedish poet, intellectual and spiritual figure.
- Frank Annunzio, 86, American politician, Parkinson's disease.
- Arthur Cantor, 81, American theatrical producer.
- Vladislav Krishchishin, 54, Ukrainian flyweight weightlifter.
- Nello Lauredi, 76, French road bicycle racer.
- Elsie Locke, 88, New Zealand writer, historian, and feminist.
- Victor Pace, 93, Maltese Olympic water polo player (1928).
- Bob Sohl, 73, American competition swimmer and Olympic medalist (1948).
- Van Stephenson, 47, American singer-songwriter, melanoma.
- Marguerite Viby, 91, Danish actress.

=== 9 ===
- Behram Contractor, 71, Indian journalist and humourist, heart attack.
- Roque Ditro, 64, Argentine football player.
- Shakoor Rana, 65, Pakistani cricket umpire.
- Graziella Sciutti, 73, Italian soprano opera singer and producer.
- Willie Stargell, 61, American baseball player (Pittsburgh Pirates), member of the Baseball Hall of Fame, stroke.
- Hsieh Tung-min, 93, Taiwanese politician and Vice President of the Republic of China.
- Lloyd Wickett, 81, American football player (Detroit Lions).

=== 10 ===
- Jean-Gabriel Albicocco, 65, French film director.
- Tadeusz Chciuk-Celt, 84, Polish special forces operative during World War II, journalist and author.
- Nora Eddington, 77, American actress and socialite, kidney failure.
- John Marmion Edmond, 57, Scottish-American MIT professor of marine geochemistry and oceanography.
- Andy Farkas, 84, American football player (Washington Redskins, Detroit Lions).
- Charles L. Freeman, 92, American sound editor and film editor.
- Michel Fribourg, 87, Belgian-American billionaire businessman.
- Pekka Lairola, 73, Finnish Olympic swimmer (1960).
- Derek Lambert, 71, English author.
- Nyree Dawn Porter, 65, New Zealand actress, leukemia.
- Richard Evans Schultes, 86, American ethnobotanist.
- Roger Vale, 58, Australian politician.

=== 11 ===
- Sandy Bull, 60, American folk musician and composer, lung cancer.
- John Harris, Baron Harris of Greenwich, 71, British political aide and politician (Chief Whip in the House of Lords from 1994 to 2001).
- Jerzy Krasówka, 76, Polish football player and Olympian (1952).
- Thaddeus McCarthy, 93, New Zealand jurist.
- Graciela Naranjo, 84, Venezuelan singer and actress.
- Carolyn R. Payton, 75, American director of the Peace Corps (1977-1978).
- J. T. Putney, 72, American racing driver, heart attack.
- Harry Secombe, 79, Welsh actor (The Goon Show, Oliver!, The Bed Sitting Room), prostate cancer.
- Jack Wilson, 83, American football player (Los Angeles Rams).

=== 12 ===
- Harvey Ball, 79, American inventor of the smiley, liver failure.
- E. W. Barker, 80, Singaporean politician and lawyer, colon surgery.
- Nelson Burbrink, 79, American baseball player (St. Louis Cardinals), cancer.
- Adolfo Clouthier, 92, Mexican Olympic javelin thrower (1932).
- Wang Enmao, 88, Chinese lieutenant general and politician.
- Harry Hinkel, 97, American racewalker and Olympian (1924, 1932).
- Reidar Hirsti, 76, Norwegian newspaper editor and politician for the Labour Party.
- Ljiljana Krstić, 81, Serbian actress.
- Shimshon Dovid Pincus, 57, American-Israeli orthodox rabbi, traffic collision.

=== 13 ===
- Mario David, 70, Argentine film director and screenwriter.
- Jimmy Logan, 73, Scottish comedian, actor, producer and director, cancer.
- Stephen C. O'Connell, 85, American jurist.
- Josephine Premice, 74, Haitian-American actress and singer, complications of emphysema.
- Ken Weston, 53, English sound engineer (Gladiator, Evita, Flash Gordon), Oscar winner (2001), kidney cancer.

=== 14 ===
- Jim Baxter, 61, Scottish football player, pancreatic cancer.
- Dorothee Metlitzki, 86, German-American author, professor of English and zionist.
- Haruo Minami, 77, Japanese enka singer and rōkyoku performer, prostate cancer.
- Bryan Ranft, 83, British historian.
- Ngan Shing-kwan, 98, Hong Kong transport and property tycoon.
- Hiroshi Teshigahara, 74, Japanese avant-garde filmmaker (Woman in the Dunes, The Face of Another), leukemia.

=== 15 ===
- Donald Dorfman, 67, American mathematical psychologist and radiologist, lymphoma.
- Jack Elway, 69, American college football player and coach (Washington State, San Jose State, Stanford), heart attack.
- Joey Ramone, 49, American musician, lead singer for The Ramones, lymphoma.
- Bo Roberson, 65, American track and field athlete, football player and Olympian (1960).
- John Verrall, 92, American composer of contemporary classical music, congestive heart failure.

=== 16 ===
- Bob Brown, 80, American basketball player.
- Emanuele Clarizio, 89, Italian prelate and diplomat of the Catholic Church.
- Giacomo Gentilomo, 92, Italian film director and painter.
- Horace Gwynne, 88, Canadian boxer and Olympic champion (1932).
- Alfred Horn, 83, American mathematician.
- Paul Kuroda, 84, Japanese-American chemist and nuclear scientist.
- Peter Maag, 81, Swiss conductor.
- John R. McNamara, 73, American naval officer and bishop.
- Robert Osterloh, 82, American actor.
- Mohammad Rabbani, Afghani politician and one of the founders of the Taliban, liver cancer.
- Hank Riebe, 79, American baseball player (Detroit Tigers), cancer.
- Michael Ritchie, 62, American film director (The Bad News Bears, Fletch, Downhill Racer), prostate cancer.
- Thomas H. Stix, 76, American physicist, leukemia.
- Alec Stock, 84, English footballer and football manager.

=== 17 ===
- Merton Davies, 83, American astronomer and space exploration pioneer.
- John Ferraro, 76, American politician (Los Angeles City Council) and college football player (USC).
- Alfred M. Moen, 84, American inventor and founder of Moen Incorporated.
- Richard McGee Morse, 78, American Latin Americanist scholar and academic, Alzheimer's disease.
- Leonid Alfonsovich Ostrovski, 65, Soviet football player and manager.
- Terry Scully, 68, British theatre and television actor, stroke.
- Danica Seleskovitch, 79, French interpreter and academic writer.

=== 18 ===
- Khursheed Bano, 87, Indian singer and actress.
- Tony Bartley, 82, British film and television executive, and fighter pilot during World War II.
- Billy Mitchell, 74, American jazz tenor saxophonist, lung cancer.
- Robert Paparemborde, 52, French rugby player, pancreatic cancer.
- John Yonakor, 79, American football player (Cleveland Browns, New York Yanks, Washington Redskins).

=== 19 ===
- Lionel Abel, 90, American playwright ("Absalom"), essayist and theater critic.
- Walter Bowden, 90, American Olympic handball player (1936).
- André du Bouchet, 77, French poet.
- Jim Hayes, 60, American football player (Houston Oilers).
- Kurt Ott, 88, Swiss Olympic cyclist (1936).
- Edith Picht-Axenfeld, 87, German pianist and harpsichordist.
- Egor Popov, 88, Russian-American civil engineer.
- Hal Haig Prieste, 104, Armenian-American Olympic diver (1920).
- Meldrim Thomson, Jr., 89, American politician, Governor of New Hampshire (1973–1979), Parkinson's disease and heart problems.
- Pierre Versins, 78, French science fiction collector and scholar.

=== 20 ===
- Antonio Asensio, 53, Spanish mass media entrepreneur, founder of Grupo Zeta, brain tumor.
- Richard H. Austin, 87, American politician, Michigan Secretary of State (1971–1994), Alzheimer's disease.
- Steven Blaisse, 60, Dutch rower and Olympic silver medalist (1960, 1964).
- Cino Cinelli, 85, Italian racing cyclist.
- Kenneth Colby, American psychiatrist and computer technology pioneer.
- David Gilbarg, 82, American professor emeritus of mathematics at Stanford University.
- Herbert Hamel, 96, Canadian ice hockey player (Toronto Maple Leafs).
- Irène Joachim, 88, French soprano, and vocal teacher.
- Maria Karnilova, 80, American ballet dancer and actress (Tony Award for Best Featured Actress in a Musical for Fiddler on the Roof).
- Va'ai Kolone, 89, Prime Minister of Samoa.
- Maurice Lauré, 83, French civil servant.
- Avigdor Miller, 92, American Haredi rabbi and author.
- Giuseppe Sinopoli, 54, Italian conductor and composer, heart attack.
- Bert Sutcliffe, 77, New Zealand cricketer, emphysema.

=== 21 ===
- Isaac Kobina Abban, 68, Ghanaian judge and Chief Justice.
- Ian Campbell, 12th Duke of Argyll, 63, British aristocrat.
- Claude Clark, 85, American painter and printmaker.
- Jack Haley Jr., 67, American film producer, director (That's Entertainment!) and documentarian, respiratory failure.
- Edmund Malecki, 86, German international footballer.
- Ulla Poulsen Skou, 96, Danish ballerina and actress.
- Erna Steinberg, 89, German Olympic sprinter (1928).
- Sandy Ullrich, 79, Cuban baseball player (Washington Senators).
- Hal White, 82, American baseball player (Detroit Tigers, St. Louis Browns, St. Louis Cardinals), stroke.

=== 22 ===
- Habis al-Majali, 87, Jordanian general and politician.
- John F. Allen, 92, Canadian physicist, stroke.
- Ike Cole, 73, American jazz pianist and composer, cancer.
- Trevor de Cleene, 68, New Zealand politician and lawyer, cancer.
- George R. Hill III, 79, American chemist, cancer.
- Fadil Hoxha, 85, Kosovar politician.
- Edward Muhl, 94, American motion picture executive.
- Heiko Oberman, 70, Dutch historian and theologian.
- Wesley C. Salmon, 75, American philosopher of science, car crash.
- Charles Schreiner III, 74, American rancher, congestive heart failure.
- Robert Starer, 77, Austrian-American composer, pianist and educator.

=== 23 ===
- Lennart Atterwall, 90, Swedish Olympic javelin thrower (1936).
- Alfredo Gottardi, 86, Brazilian football player.
- Sir Charles Madden, 2nd Baronet, 94, British admiral.
- Electra Waggoner Biggs, 88, American heiress, socialite and sculptor.
- Guglielmo Biraghi, 73, Italian film critic and film festival director.
- Robert J. Huber, 78, American politician (U.S. Representative for Michigan's 18th congressional district from 1973 to 1975).
- R. A. C. Parker, 73, British historian.
- Jayant Shridhar Tilak, 79, Indian politician and newspaper editor.
- Imre Vígh, 63, Hungarian Olympic wrestler (1964).
- David M. Walker, 56, American astronaut (STS-51-A, STS-30, STS-53, STS 69), stroke.

=== 24 ===
- Hilda Cameron, 88, Canadian sprinter and Olympic medallist (1936).
- Lindsay Daen, 78, New Zealand sculptor and artist.
- Roger Heinkelé, 88, French Olympic diver (1936, 1948).
- Al Hibbler, 85, American singer (Duke Ellington Orchestra).
- Shailesh Matiyani, 69, India hindi writer, poet and essayist.
- Lansing Leroy Mitchell, 87, American district judge (United States District Court for the Eastern District of Louisiana).
- Peter Nugent, 63, Australian politician, heart attack.
- Josef Peters, 87, German racing driver.
- Leon Sullivan, 78, American civil rights leader, social activist and Baptist minister, leukemia.
- Paul Thieme, 96, German indologist.
- Johnny Valentine, 72, American professional wrestler.
- Li Yuqin, 72, Chinese noble and fourth wife of emperor Puyi, liver cirrhosis.

=== 25 ===
- Michele Alboreto, 44, Italian race car driver, car crash.
- Kow Nkensen Arkaah, 73, Ghanaian politician, Vice-President (1993–1997), injuries from a traffic collision.
- Viktor Bannikov, 62, Soviet/Ukrainian football player and official.
- Chaya Devi, 86, Indian film actress.
- Gwen Frostic, 94, American artist, entrepreneur and author.
- Majda Potokar, 71, Slovenian actress.
- Clovis Stark, 86, American basketball player.

=== 26 ===
- Henry Boltinoff, 87, American cartoonist.
- Guy Butler, 83, South African poet, academic and writer.
- Ruth Hellberg, 94, German actress.
- Lili Massaferro, 74, Argentine actress and Montoneros militant, thrombophlebitis.
- Amrit Nahata, 72, Indian politician and film maker.
- André Pascal, 69, French songwriter and composer.
- Sverre Walter Rostoft, 88, Norwegian businessperson and politician.
- Rudolf Trenkel, 83, German fighter pilot and flying ace during World War II.
- Elisabeth Tschermak-Woess, 84, Austrian cytologist and phycologist.
- Renzo Vespignani, 77, Italian painter, engraver and writer.

=== 27 ===
- Charlie Applewhite, 68, American singer and radio host.
- Wayne Davenport, 94, American football player (Green Bay Packers).
- Ernie Graham, 54, Northern Irish singer, guitarist and songwriter.
- Jack Murdock, 78, American actor (Rain Man, Altered States, Any Which Way You Can), emphysema.
- Piero Regnoli, 79, Italian screenwriter and film director.
- Richard M. Scammon, 85, American political scientist and author, Alzheimer's disease.
- John Winton, 69, British navy officer and writer.

=== 28 ===
- António Araújo, 77, Portuguese football player.
- Paul Daneman, 75, British actor (Not in Front of the Children, The Professionals, How I Won the War).
- Border Gezi, 36, Zimbabwean politician, traffic collision.
- Erica Green, 3, American child abuse victim, murdered.
- Ken Hughes, 79, English film director, writer and producer (Chitty Chitty Bang Bang), complications from Alzheimer's disease.
- Marie Jahoda, 94, Austrian-British social psychologist.
- Evelyn Künneke, 79, German singer and actress, lung cancer.
- Yoshio Okita, 98, Japanese Olympic track and field athlete (1928).
- James Still, 94, American poet, novelist and folklorist.
- Germán Sopeña, 55, Argentine writer and journalist, plane crash.
- Guy Texereau, 65, French Olympic long-distance runner (1960, 1964, 1968).
- Bako Touré, 61, Malian football player.

=== 29 ===
- Barend Biesheuvel, 81, Dutch politician, Prime Minister (1971-1973), cardiovascular disease.
- Diana Brebner, 44, Canadian poet.
- Babu Chiri Sherpa, 35, Nepalese sherpa mountaineer, fall when climbing Mount Everest.
- Dubai Millennium, 5, British thoroughbred racehorse, grass sickness.
- Walter Hannemann, 88, American film editor, natural causes.
- Rita Hunter, 67, British operatic dramatic soprano.
- Andy Phillip, 79, American basketball player (Philadelphia Warriors, Fort Wayne Pistons, Boston Celtics).
- Allan Sloane, 86, American writer for radio and television.
- Gordon Watson, 87, English football player.

=== 30 ===
- Andreas Kupfer, 86, German football player.
- Maladi, 88, Indonesian athlete, songwriter, and politician.
- Brian Morris, Baron Morris of Castle Morris, 70, British poet, academic and politician, leukaemia.
- Frank Stewart, 94, American baseball player (Chicago White Sox).
- Wang Zhenglin, 88, Chinese Olympic long-distance runner (1936).
