= Plaga Zombie (film series) =

Argentine film series

The Plaga Zombie Trilogy
- Directed by: Pablo Parés; Hernán Sáez; Paulo Soria (3)
- Written by: Pablo Parés; Hernán Sáez; Berta Muñiz (1); Paulo Soria (3)
- Produced by: Berta Muñiz; Pablo Parés; Hernán Sáez; Juan B. Dartiguelongue (2); Walter Cornás (2); Paulo Soria (2); Urco Urquiza (2); Filipe Melo (3)
- Starring: Pablo Parés; Berta Muñiz; Hernán Sáez; Walter Cornás; Paulo Soria; Esteban Podetti; Diego Parés (1,3); Alejandro Nagy (2); Andres Perrone (2); Ariel Olivetti (2); Pablo Fayó (3)
- Cinematography: Pablo Parés; Hernán Sáez; Diego Echave (3)
- Edited by: Pablo Parés (1,3); Hernán Sáez
- Music by: Pablo Vostrouski; Alejandro D'Aloisio (2); Hernán Sáez (2,3); Paulo Soria (2,3)
- Production company: FARSA Productions
- Distributed by: Fangoria Films (1,2); Videoflims (3)
- Release dates: November 1997 (Plaga Zombie); 21 December 2001 (Plaga Zombie: Zona Mutante); 12 March 2012 (Plaga Zombie: Revolución Tóxica)
- Running time: 270 minutes
- Country: Argentina
- Language: Spanish

Plaga Zombie is an Argentine comedy horror film series created by Pablo Parés, Berta Muñiz, and Hernán Sáez. The films follow three misfit heroes who uncover an alien-government conspiracy after a zombie outbreak occurs in their hometown. Plaga Zombie was the first-ever zombie horror film released in Argentina and is the only zombie horror trilogy to be produced in Latin America.

Plaga Zombie received mainstream coverage from Fangoria and was picked up by its horror label, Fangoria Films International, helping the series to attain a worldwide cult following. The latest installment of the series, Plaga Zombie: American Invasion, began production in the summer of 2013.

== History ==
The original Plaga Zombie film was conceived by Pablo Parés and Hernán Sáez. Using a family video camera, the two began making home movies with a group of childhood friends in high school. Several people became key personal for FARSA Productions, most notably, Berta Muñiz, Paulo Soria and Walter Cornás. At age 17, Parés and Sáez decided to start their first major film project, a horror comedy about a zombie outbreak which occurs in their hometown, which they both directed, wrote, and starred in with Muñiz. Produced on a very low budget, reportedly for only a few hundred dollars, and no formal film training, Plaga Zombie was very popular with audiences in Argentina and eventually gained an international following.

The filmmakers used common household items such as cake mix and food coloring for the zombie make up in Plaga Zombie. In the sequel, they also used toilet paper, unflavored gelatin (with water to make a paste), and latex.

Although the filmmakers immediately began working on the sequel, Plaga Zombie: Zona Mutante took over four years to complete. The film had over twice the budget as the first Plaga Zombie, estimated at $3,000, significantly improving production value. The filmmakers, however, claimed that the film "took its toll on everyone" and at one point production was halted to film Never Go to Those Kind of Parties (2000). There was difficulty in finding extras for the film and were confronted by angry residents and policemen during shooting. A local television station aired a special broadcast asking for people to play zombies which included giving out the director's home phone number. Several friendly police officers also visited the set to ask for cameos in the film. Post-production was also a painstaking process with literally years worth of footage to fit into a 100 min. film. Parés and Sáez did not finish editing their film until 40 minutes before its theatrical premiere requiring it to be played back on a laptop.

The third and final chapter of the series, Plaga Zombie: Zona Mutante – Revolución Tóxica, was released in 2012. Unlike the first two films which used traditional special effects, the filmmakers employed computer-generated imagery for the first time. Franca Gallo and Rodrigo Guerechit of Rabbid EFX, who had previously worked on their 2011 horror short Daemonium, were brought in as the main special effects artists. In addition to certain action sequences, the length of time between films meant that the stars were significantly older compared to the 1997 film. Each entry in the series covered 24 hours of the 3-day alien invasion and so it was necessary to maintain the illusion that the three had not aged. They did try to keep the film faithful to the visual style of the previous entries.

The Plaga Zombie trilogy was eventually released on FARSA Productions official YouTube channel with the first in November 2010, the second in September 2011, and the third in March 2012; Plaga Zombie: Zona Mutante has received over 2 million views on the website (as of September 2013).

=== Future ===
In the spring of 2013, it was announced that a new Plaga Zombie film would be produced in the United States by Sai-Con Productions. An independent film studio based in New Bedford, Massachusetts, the company is best known for its award-winning 2007 horror film The Terror Factor. Writer-director Garry Mederios discovered the Plaga Zombie series after watching the Fangoria Film DVD. Mederios enjoyed the series so much that he contacted the filmmakers via e-mail and became friends. He jokingly suggested making an American-based Plaga Zombie film during one of their exchanges but FARSA Productions was very receptive to the idea and plans were eventually made to produce a feature-length film.

Set in the same universe as the original trilogy, Plaga Zombie: American Invasion is to feature three new characters who emerge during a zombie outbreak in New Bedford, Massachusetts. It was confirmed by both cast member Walter Rivero and director Garry Mederios that Pablo Parés, Berta Muñiz, and Hernán Sáez will be making cameo appearances. A relative of Argentine-born actor Ben Tolosa, one of the three U.S. co-stars, is a close family friend of the FARSA filmmakers though Tolosa himself was unaware of this connection when he first auditioned for the role. Rivero, who had a minor part in Plaga Zombie: Zona Mutante, will have a supporting role (albeit as another character) in the film.

The film will be using a combination of digital and special effects similar to Plaga Zombie: Zona Mutante – Revolución Tóxica. A FARSA Productions special effects artist will be designing prosthetics and props for one of the lead cast members. Principal filming is to take place in downtown New Bedford and should be completed by the following spring. The first day of shooting began on September 29, 2013, on West Island Beach in Fairhaven, Massachusetts. Another film shoot at Sinners & Saints, a tattoo parlor in East Wareham, was covered by the Wareham Weekly. Plaga Zombie: American Invasion was partially funded by a crowdsourcing campaign on Indiegogo as well as a number of promotional events held in Southern New England. The producers introduced unique fundraising ideas based on the level of donations, ranging from $10 to $100, which includes an appearance in the film, access to exclusive events, and various merchandise; a donation of $1,000 earns a producer credit and business shown in the film while $2,500 allows the donor to choose one of two possible endings for the film. The production was selected by NewEnglandFilm.com for its New England–based feature film project of the month in October 2013. One of Sai-Con's upcoming promotional events will be at the 2013 Monster Dash, a 5k race and zombie walk, in Worcester, Massachusetts and Providence, Rhode Island on October 26–27, 2013. The winner of the 2013 Monster Dash will receive a minor role in the film.

== Films ==
=== Plaga Zombie (1997) ===
Plaga Zombie follows Bill Johnson (Pablo Parés), John West (Berta Muñiz), and Max Giggs (Hernán Sáez), who find themselves in the midst of a zombie outbreak in their hometown. The cause of the outbreak is an alien-engineered virus, introduced into the local population, meant to exterminate the human race. When a horde of zombies break into Bill's house, the three young men are forced to hide in an upstairs bedroom and must devise a way to kill the zombie invaders to survive.

=== Plaga Zombie: Zona Mutante (2001) ===
Set hours after the first film, Plaga Zombie: Zona Mutante reveals that an Argentine government agency is working with the aliens in exchange for protection from the virus. Bill Johnson, John West, and Max Giggs are among the remaining survivors from the outbreak being held in custody. Rather than executing them, as demanded by Agent James Dana (Esteban Podetti), the agency chief (Alejandro Nagy) orders that the three be released back into the zombie-infested town.

Once back inside, the trio find the alien virus has transformed their entire hometown. They briefly find refuge in John West's house but are separated when Bill is carried off during a zombie attack. John and Max attempt to find their way out of the town and get help but upon reaching the city limits find a deep ravine blocking escape. Meanwhile, Bill manages to elude his zombie captors and encounters an injured agent (Andres Perrone) hiding in the sewers. The agent explains he was abandoned by his team after being bitten by a zombie but still has a floppy disk which shows the town's one remaining escape route. Bill later gains possession of the disk, and once rejoining his friends, is able to access a working computer only to discover that it will take 12 hours to decode the disk. As they await the countdown, Bill, John, and Max must not only avoid the town's zombies but also a government death squad headed by Agent Dana.

=== Plaga Zombie: Zona Mutante – Revolución Tóxica (2012) ===
It has been three days since the zombie outbreak. Bill Johnson, John West, and Max Giggs are being chased by a UFO which locks on to a zombie being carried by John. The luchadore holds on to the zombie, egged on by Giggs, but is unable to win against the ship's tractor beam which radically transforms John in the process. It is during this encounter that Bill and Giggs discover a disturbing secret regarding the zombies. Tired of running, the three heroes decide to take the fight to the aliens. Giggs develops a plan in which the three will capture an infected human, feed it large amounts of gunpowder, and lure the aliens into taking it aboard their spacecraft. Once aboard, the "trojan zombie" would explode and destroy the alien mothership.

Shortly after splitting up, however, they lose contact with each other and become sidetracked. John discovers he has lost his strength after being humiliated by a gang of zombies and becomes plagued with fear and self-doubt. After witnessing a government helicopter crash, Bill pursues renegade agent Jack Taylor (Walter Cornás) who has a device able to detect the alien mothership. Giggs manages to capture a zombie, which he names "Junior" (Paulo Soria), but soon develops a parental affection for it and begins to have second thoughts about going through with the plan. Can the three stop the aliens before they move on to the next phase of their invasion?

=== Plaga Zombie: American Invasion (2021) ===
The story takes place 20 years after the events of the original trilogy. The aliens reappear in New England where they introduce a new virus in New Bedford, Massachusetts to create another zombie outbreak. In order to stop the virus from spreading to the rest of the country, the U.S. government decides to "detach the city at its faultline", separating it from the continental United States, and setting New Bedford adrift into the Atlantic Ocean. four new heroes—Nash Walker (Corey Spencer), Sam Samson (Matthew Hill), and Manny Distefano (Ben Tolosa) and a mercenary for hire Kobra Guevara (Walter Rivero)—emerge during the initial hours of the outbreak. Like their Argentine counterparts, they too must battle a city overrun by zombies to defeat the alien invasion in addition to stopping the "floating city" before it collides with the Azores Islands.

== Cast and characters ==
Character	Film		
Character	Plaga Zombie	Plaga Zombie: Zona Mutante	Plaga Zombie: Revolución Tóxica
Bill Johnson	Pablo Parés	Pablo Parés	Pablo Parés
John West	Berta Muñiz	Berta Muñiz	Berta Muñiz
Max Giggs	Hernán Sáez	Hernán Sáez	Hernán Sáez
Mike Taylor	Walter Cornás		
Willie Boxer	Diego Parés		Diego Parés
Agent James Dana	Esteban Podetti	Esteban Podetti	Esteban Podetti
Junior		Paulo Soria	Paulo Soria
Max Fan		Paulo Soria	
The Chief		Alejandro Nagy	
Agent Scott Lee Ray		Andres Perrone	
Agent Tony Todd		Ariel Olivetti	
Rebelde		Walter Cornás	
Agent Jack Taylor			Walter Cornás
Agent David Fox			Pablo Fayó

== Crew and other ==
Role	Film		
Role	Plaga Zombie	Plaga Zombie: Zona Mutante	Plaga Zombie: Revolución Tóxica
Director	Pablo Parés & Hernán Sáez	Pablo Parés & Hernán Sáez	Pablo Parés & Hernán Sáez with Paulo Soria
Producer	Berta Muñiz, Pablo Parés & Hernán Sáez	Berta Muñiz, Pablo Parés & Hernán Sáez; Juan Bautista Dartiguelongue; Walter Cornás; Paulo Soria; Urco Urquiza	Berta Muñiz, Pablo Parés & Hernán Sáez; Filipe Melo
Writer	Berta Muñiz, Pablo Parés & Hernán Sáez	Pablo Parés & Hernán Sáez	Pablo Parés & Hernán Sáez; Paulo Soria
Music	Pablo Vostrouski	Pablo Vostrouski with Alejandro D'Aloisio, Hernán Sáez & Paulo Soria	Pablo Vostrouski with Hernán Sáez & Paulo Soria
Cinematographer	Pablo Parés & Hernán Sáez	Pablo Parés & Hernán Sáez	Pablo Parés & Hernán Sáez; Diego Echave
Special effects	Pablo Parés & Walter Cornás	Pablo Parés & Walter Cornás	Pablo Parés & Walter Cornás; Franca Gallo; Rodrigo Guerechit
Running time	69 minutes	101 minutes	100 minutes

== Reception ==
Plaga Zombie, a landmark film in the Argentine independent film industry, as well as amateur filmmaking, was the first feature film about zombies made in Argentina. While made with a very low budget and limited resources, the film became a shining example as both a cult and fantasy film generating a horror film movement in the country that has continued to grow into the 21st century. The film has maintained its cult status, especially among fans of gore. UNC-Chapel Hill film scholar Jonathan Risner considers Plaga Zombie to mark the beginning of modern Argentine horror cinema. The success of the series inspired similar horror films in South America such as Uruguay's Achuras (2003), Chile's Solos (2008), and Brazil's Mangue negro (2008). Argentine director Germán Magariños, who played a zombie in the original film, went on to the country's second zombie horror Zombie Apocalypse Now: A Zombie Hunter (2008).

It was at the Mar del Plata Film Festival where Parés met Filipe Melo, creator of the first-ever Portuguese horror short I'll See You In My Dreams. After meeting the Plaga Zombie crew, Melo invited Parés to his home in Mouraz, Portugal to collaborate on a film script. The two wrote a first draft of what would become The Adventures of Dog Mendonça & Pizzaboy in 15 days.

The second film in the trilogy, Plaga Zombie: Zona Mutante, was released in 2001 and subsequently screened in film festivals around the world. On November 4, 2002, it was one of eleven films selected for the "Perversa America Latina" portion of the 13th annual San Sebastian Horror and Fantasy Film Festival and one of two, along with Armando Bó's 1968 film Carne, to represent Argentina at the festival. The film made its debut in the United Kingdom on April 26, 2003, for the 10th anniversary of the "Dead by Dawn" horror film festival at the Edinburgh Filmhouse. As one of the festival's midnight movies, Simon Wilkinson of Kinoeye.org observed that "the film succeeded in grabbing the audience's attention—at one point even resorting to an irresistibly catchy, impromptu musical number placed amidst the relentless action."

The Plaga Zombie series was profiled by Fangoria during this period resulting in considerable exposure for the filmmakers. Fangoria film producer Steven Mackler described watching Plaga Zombie for the first time:

When I screened Plaga Zombie in my office, the howls of laughter from both my daughter and me echoed throughout the building. The film is off-the-wall and totally crazy. Plaga Zombie is not your garden-variety zombie film. It's as if Monty Python made a horror/splatter flick.

The horror magazine eventually bought the film rights to Plaga Zombie: Zona Mutante which was released worldwide by its film label Fangoria Films International. On September 12, 2005, making its U.S. East Coast premiere, it was screened at the East Village's Two Boots Pioneer Theater as the feature attraction for Fangoria's monthly "Monster Mondays" film series. Walter Rivero, a cast member of the film, claimed the young filmmakers never received payment for the film rights and led to a falling out between Fangoria and FARSA Productions.

The third film in the trilogy, Plaga Zombie: Revolución Tóxica, premiered at the Buenos Aires Rojo Sangre on October 30, 2011. Revolución Tóxica received the Audience Award for Best Feature Film and Hernán Sáez won for Best Actor. The Plaga Zombie series was given special recognition by the Jury for "creative efforts over time to build a trilogy". It was also screened at the Mar del Plata Film Festival in Mar del Plata, Argentina and the Montevideo Comics fan convention in Montevideo, Uruguay. Plaga Zombie: Revolución Tóxica was released in theatres in March 2012. It opened in Buenos Aires on March 12, 2012, and then throughout Argentina at the end of the month. The film was simultaneously broadcast online with its theatrical debut. On April 12, 2013, the film was screened to a sold-out crowd at the Buenos Aires International Festival of Independent Cinema.

Reviews for all three films have been generally positive and praised for its over-the-top action scenes and gore effects. Its humorous "slapstick" approach to the genre earned comparisons to similar horror-comedies such as Peter Jackson's Bad Taste and Dead Alive or Sam Raimi's Evil Dead II. The filmmakers themselves are admitted fans of these films but claim never to have seen George A. Romero's Night of the Living Dead series. Peter Dendle, a Penn State Mont Alto film scholar, has said that the films are more akin to Japanese-style horror with "the deliberate piling up of non-sequiters and flaunting of narrative expectations".
