= Tepper =

Tepper is a surname. Notable people with the surname include:

- Bryan Tepper, Canadian politician
- David Tepper (born 1957), American investor and owner of the NFL's Carolina Panthers
- J. G. O. Tepper (1841–1923), South Australian entomologist
- Jeremy Tepper (born 1963), American country musician
- Leonard Tepper (1939–2001), American actor
- Lou Tepper (born 1945), American football coach
- Robert Tepper, American singer
- Sheri S. Tepper (1929-2016), American author
- Sid Tepper (1918–2015), Jewish American singer and songwriter
- Stephen Tepper (born 1969), hockey player
- Susan Tepper (1943–1991), American artist
- William Tepper (1948–2017), American actor and screenwriter
- Yotam Tepper, Israeli archaeologist

== See also ==
- Tepper Aviation, a cargo airline
- Tepper School of Business, the business school at Carnegie Mellon University named after David Tepper
