= Monchile Concepción =

Puerto Rican baseball player (born 1905)

- Outfielder
- Born: February 5, 1905; San Juan, Puerto Rico
- Died: December 4, 1967 (aged 62); San Juan, Puerto Rico
- Batted: Right Threw: Right

Negro league baseball debut
- 1929, for the Lincoln Giants

Last appearance
- 1934, for the Bacharach Giants
- Stats at Baseball Reference

Teams
- Lincoln Giants (1929); Cuban Stars (East) (1931, 1934); Bacharach Giants (1934)

Ramón Concepción Ramos (February 5, 1905 – December 4, 1967), nicknamed "Monchile", was a Puerto Rican outfielder in the Negro leagues between 1929 and 1934.

A native of San Juan, Puerto Rico, Concepción made his Negro leagues debut in 1929 with the Lincoln Giants. He went on to play for the Cuban Stars (East) and the Bacharach Giants.

Concepción managed the Puerto Rico national baseball team at the 1953 Amateur World Series, held in Venezuela. The tem, which included Felle Delgado (as a coach) and future major leaguer Félix Torres, finished in sixth place.

He died in San Juan in 1967 at age 62.
