= Daniel de la Vega (disambiguation) =

Daniel de la Vega may refer to:

- Daniel de la Vega (1892–1971), Chilean poet and playwright
- Daniel de la Vega (Argentine film director) (born 1972), Argentine film director, directed Jennifer's Shadow and acted in Plaga Zombie: Zona Mutante
- Daniel de la Vega (Chilean film director)
- Daniel de la Vega (animator), American animator/director, worked on Belle's Magical World, Fangface, et al.
