= PussyCake =

2021 Argentine horror film

- Directed by: Pablo Parés
- Written by: Maxi Ferzzola
- Starring: Maca Suárez; Anahi Politi; Flor Moreno
- Release date: 11 December 2021 (BARS)
- Country: Argentina
- Language: Spanish

PussyCake (Spanish: Emesis – El amor Mata, lit. 'Emesis – Love Kills'), also spelled Pussy Cake, is a 2021 Argentine horror film directed by Pablo Parés. The film follows an all-female rock band who arrives at the first stop on a tour to find the town deserted, and their lives threatened.

PussyCake premiered at the Buenos Aires Rojo Sangre (BARS) film festival on 11 December 2021. It was also released on video-on-demand (VOD) and Cinedigm's horror streaming service Screambox in 2022.

== Cast ==
- Maca Suárez
- Anahi Politi
- Flor Moreno
- Aldana Ruberto
- Sofia Rossi

== Production ==
The film's special effects were designed by Simon Ratziel and Marcos Berta. Loly Boer served as the film's costume designer.

== Release ==
PussyCake premiered at the Buenos Aires Rojo Sangre (BARS) film festival on 11 December 2021, where it received the Audience Award for Best Feature. In April 2022, it screened at Night Visions in Finland. It was later shown at the Sitges Film Festival in Spain in October 2022.

In February 2022, the worldwide distribution rights to the film were acquired by Raven Banner Entertainment. Cinedigm then acquired the North American rights to the film. The film was released on such video-on-demand (VOD) platforms as Apple, Amazon Prime Video, Google, Vudu, and Xbox, as well as Cinedigm's horror streaming service Screambox in 2022.
