= Antigua, My Life =

2001 film by Héctor Olivera

Antigua vida mía
- Theatrical release poster
- Directed by: Héctor Olivera
- Written by: Ángeles González Sinde; Alberto Macías
- Produced by: Luis Osvaldo Repetto; Luis Alberto Scalella
- Starring: Ana Belén; Cecilia Roth; Juan Leyrado; Jorge Marrale
- Cinematography: Alfredo Mayo
- Edited by: Miguel Pérez
- Music by: Ángel Illarramendi
- Production companies: Aries Cinematográfica Argentina; Luis Escalella; Tornasol Films; Enrique Cerezo PC
- Release dates: 3 May 2001 (Argentina); 15 February 2002 (Spain)
- Running time: 110 min.
- Countries: Argentina; Spain
- Language: Spanish
- Budget: €3,600,000

Antigua, My Life (Spanish: Antigua vida mía) is a 2001 drama film directed by Héctor Olivera and written by Ángeles González Sinde and Alberto Macías, from the novel by the Chilean writer Marcela Serrano. An Argentine and Spanish co-production, it stars Ana Belén and Cecilia Roth.

== Plot ==
The plot explores the friendship between singer-songwriter Josefa and art restorer Violeta, who is beaten up by her husband.

== Cast ==
- Ana Belén .... Josefa Ferrer
- Cecilia Roth .... Violeta Dasinski
- Daniel Valenzuela .... Sargento
- Jorge Marrale .... Andrés
- Diana Lamas .... Pamela
- Guido D'Albo .... Locutor TV
- Juan Leyrado .... Eduardo
- Nicolás Agüero .... Borja
- Josefina Gracián .... Celeste
- Sawa Tramer .... Zulema
- Alfredo Casero .... Alejandro
- Christian Inglizze .... Artesano (as Christian Inglize)
- Odiseo Bichir .... Emilio Palma
- Cristi Cobar .... Doña Rogeria
- Dario Tangelson .... Maza
- Iván Moschner .... Maître

== Production ==
It was shot in Buenos Aires and Antigua (Guatemala).

== Release ==
It was released theatrically in Spain on 15 February 2002.

== Reception ==
Actress Cecilia Roth was nominated for a Silver Condor Award for Best Actress in 2002.

== See also ==
- List of Argentine films of 2001
- List of Spanish films of 2002
