= End of the Line (2007 film) =

2007 Canadian film by Maurice Devereaux

- Directed by: Maurice Devereaux
- Written by: Maurice Devereaux
- Produced by: Maurice Devereaux
- Starring: Ilona Elkin; Nicolas Wright; Neil Napier; Emily Shelton; Tim Rozon; Nina Fillis
- Cinematography: Denis-Noel Mostert
- Edited by: Maurice Devereaux
- Music by: Martin Gauthier
- Distributed by: Anchor Bay Entertainment
- Release date: 2007
- Running time: 95 minutes
- Country: Canada
- Language: English

End of the Line is a 2007 Canadian horror film written, produced and directed by Maurice Devereaux.

== Plot ==
Karen, a traumatized woman, has a horrific nightmare involving a subway train. The flashback narrative plot follows her trapped in a subway. A Christian doomsday cult has been consuming and distributing hallucinogen-laced muffins that make people see visions of flashlight-eyed demons. On a texted signal, they take over services and begin massacring non-believers throughout the city, believing it is their mission to "save" the souls of humanity for God, which can only be accomplished by killing people with swords and daggers. It is not possible to get help by calling 911, because all the phones are controlled by cultists, who also control the TV, the internet and the radio. A group of surviving train passengers and subway workers try to fight off and escape the cultists, but die one by one, leaving only Karen, Mike, and Viviane alive when the cultists are signaled to commit a mass suicide.

== Cast ==
- Ilona Elkin as Karen
- Nicolas Wright as Mike
- Neil Napier as Neil
- Emily Shelton as Julie
- Tim Rozon as John
- Nina Fillis as Sarah
- Joan McBride as Betty
- Kent McQuaid as Ron
- Danny Blanco Hall as Davis
- John Vamvas as Frankie
- Christine Lan as Viviane
- Robin Wilcock as Patrick
- Tod Fennell as Conrad

== Soundtrack ==
The soundtrack composed by Martin Gauthier was released on July 20, 2010, by 2m1 Records.

== Reception ==
The film debuted in limited release, but it garnered mostly favorable reviews from the few critics who saw it. The Village Voice called it "scary as hell and impressively unrelenting." C. Robert Cargill from Ain't It Cool News praised it as a "truly inspired original effort," noting its modest budget and its daring, unusual premise. The film also won prizes at several festivals including Fantastic Fest's Special Jury Prize.
