= Maurice Devereaux =

Canadian film maker

- Born: Montreal, Quebec, Canada
- Education: Ahuntsic College
- Occupations: Film director, producer, screenwriter, editor

Maurice Devereaux is a Canadian film director, screenwriter and film producer through his production company, Maurice Devereaux Productions.

== Biography ==
Maurice Devereaux (pronounced Morris Devro) was born in Montreal, Quebec, Canada, and showed an interest in movies at an early age. He writes, produces, directs and edits his own films ever since he studied cinema at Ahuntsic College. Devereaux's self-description was featured on the Slashers DVD:

"Mine is a typical film-geek heritage; tons of Spielberg, Lucas and comic book superheroes as a kid. Superman the Movie, Star Wars, Close Encounters, Empire and Raiders are the movies that made me want to become a movie maker. In my teens, Carpenter, Kubrick, Raimi, Coppola, Romero and Argento were a huge influence. I also learned a lot reading Starlog and Fangoria magazines. In my twenties Lynch, Von Trier, the Coens, Jodorowsky, Rohmer, Allen and Scorsese had become a big part of my cinephile diet. Gigs directing and editing commercials and music videos, co-writing, editing and assistant-directing various shorts and features for filmmaker friends kept me alive during the long years trying to complete my own features."

After his self-financed first effort, Blood Symbol (1994), his second feature, Lady of the Lake (1998) and his follow-up, Slashers (2001), were distributed in the United States under the "Fangoria presents" label, and in the U.K., Canada, France, and Germany. He then wrote and directed PMS: Survival Tips (2003), a short film shot over a week-end, winner of the most popular film at the SPASM film festival, and a YouTube hit (December 2006) with well over 2 million viewers in just a month.

== End of the Line ==
Devereaux's film, End of the Line (2007) was an official selection of the Toronto International Film Festival and won the Audience Award for Best Feature at the Dead by Dawn film festival in Scotland (2007) and the Silver Audience Award at Fantasia Film Festival in Montreal (2007). It has also appeared at many other prestigious film festivals (San Sebastien Horror and Fantasy Film Festival in Spain, Boston Underground Film Festival, Philadelphia Film Festival, Palm Springs International Film Festival, Kingston Canadian Film Festival, Nashville Film Festival, Brussels International Festival of Fantastic Film).

== Filmography ==
=== Writer, Producer, Director, Editor ===
- Blood Symbol (1994)
- Lady of the Lake (1998)
- Slashers (2001)
- PMS: Survival Tips (short film, winner most popular film, SPASM film festival) (2003)
- End of the Line (official selection, Toronto International Film Festival) (2007)
