= The Adventures of Dog Mendonça & Pizzaboy =

Comic books by Filipe Melo, 2010 to 2012

- Dark Horse cover volume 1
- Created by: Filipe Melo

Publication information
- Publisher: Dark Horse Comics; Tinta-da-China
- Publication date: October 2010 – 2012
- Number of issues: 3
- Main character(s): Eurico Catatau; João Vicente "Dog" Mendonça; Pazuul Nhgwaiatuu; Gargoyle

Creative team
- Writer(s): Filipe Melo
- Artist(s): Juan Cavia, Santiago Villa
- Letterer(s): Pedro Semedo

The Adventures of Dog Mendonça & Pizzaboy is a comic book trilogy, written and created by Filipe Melo, illustrated by Juan Cavia and painted by Santiago Villa.

== Overview ==
A young pizza delivery boy, a middle-aged werewolf, a six-thousand-year-old demon, and the severed head of a gargoyle face the forces of evil which threaten mankind.

== Publication history ==
The books were originally published in Portugal by Tinta-da-China and in the U.S. by Dark Horse Comics. In addition to the three volumes, the creative team was invited to write a story for an anthology celebrating the 25th anniversary of Dark Horse Presents, also featuring works by Frank Miller and Mike Mignola. The story was later published in the book The Untold Tales of Dog Mendonça and Pizzaboy. The three volumes have forewords by film directors John Landis, George A. Romero, and Tobe Hooper.

=== The Incredible Adventures of Dog Mendonça & Pizzaboy ===
Eurico Catatau is a young pizza delivery boy. After witnessing his motorbike being stolen by a gargoyle, he hires João Vicente "Dog" Mendonça, private investigator of the occult, and his assistant Pazuul Nhgwaiatuu. Together they soon realise that the problem is bigger than they expected. Accompanied by the head of the gargoyle responsible for the theft, they will face the underworld of the Lisbon sewers.

=== The Extraordinary Adventures of Dog Mendonça & Pizzaboy - Apocalipse ===
Dog, Pizzaboy, Pazuul and Gargoyle are back and this time they will have to face the Apocalypse, as described in the Book of Revelation. Plagues of insects, giant creatures, two hundred thousand demons invade Earth, dragging our heroes on an adventure of biblical proportions. The fate of the world will again be decided in Lisbon.

=== The Fantastic Adventures of Dog Mendonça & Pizzaboy ===
Eurico is now married and father of two. Dog Mendonça and Pazuul are kicked out of their mansion by the Portuguese government, and they join Eurico and his family. Dog has a gig as Santa Claus at the local shopping center, but an enemy from the past returns to haunt him. The team must get together one last time to save the world. The trailer for the third book became a viral hit on Youtube, reaching over two million hits in two days.

=== The Untold Tales of Dog Mendonça & Pizzaboy ===
In this compilation of stories, originally published in Dark Horse Presents #4, 5, 6 & 7, Dog Mendonça narrates his curious background and childhood, from a circus in Tondela and into the depths of a Nazi concentration camp in the Black Forest.

The anthology where they were first presented won the Eisner Award for Best Anthology.

== In other media ==
=== The Interactive Adventures of Dog Mendonça & Pizzaboy ===
A video game adaptation was undertaken by OKAM Studio using their in-house open source Godot Engine. As of October 2014, according to the company, the game was 80% complete with the remainder of the game's development being crowdfunded. The game was finally released on March 4, 2016 for Linux, Mac OS X and Windows.

== Awards ==
Awards	
Best Script	Amadora BD 2011
Best Album	Amadora BD 2012
Best Author and Best National Publication	IX Troféus Central Comics
Best Script and Best National Publication	X Troféus Central Comics
Eisner Award	Dark Horse Presents - Best Anthology
