= Juan Cavia =

Argentinian illustrator and director (born 1984)

- Born: January 14, 1984 (age 42) Buenos Aires, Argentina
- Area: Artist
- Notable works: 'The Adventures of Dog Mendonça and Pizzaboy'

Juan Cavia (born 14 January 1984 in Buenos Aires, Argentina) is an Argentinian production designer, art director, and illustrator.

== Biography ==
Juan Cavia developed his skills in painting, drawing, composition, dynamics and various techniques of representation and animation. After secondary school, he began to study film while working as storyboard artist and concept designer.

Since 2005, he has been working as an art director for film, theater and advertising.

== Comics ==
He was a co-author of The Adventures of Dog Mendonça & Pizzaboy (book trilogy), Os vampiros and Comer Beber. He frequently collaborates with writer Filipe Melo and artist Santiago Villa. The forewords of volume I and volume II were written by legendary filmmakers John Landis, Tobe Hooper and George A. Romero. In 2012, he illustrated a story for an anthology commemorating the 25th anniversary of Dark Horse Presents, a compilation featuring works by Frank Miller and Mike Mignola.

== Films ==
As production designer, he worked for nine feature films. He frequently collaborates with art director and production designer Walter Cornás. Cavia also was responsible for the set design of the film El Secreto de Sus Ojos, which won the Oscar Award for best foreign film in 2010.
