= Pekka Lairola =

Finnish swimmer (1928–2001)

Personal information
- Born: 7 January 1928 Turku, Finland
- Died: 10 April 2001 (aged 73) Turku, Finland

Sport
- Sport: Swimming

Pekka Lairola (7 January 1928 – 10 April 2001) was a Finnish breaststroke swimmer. He competed in two events at the 1960 Summer Olympics.
