= Robert M. McKinney =

American Journalist, News Paper Proprietor and Diplomat

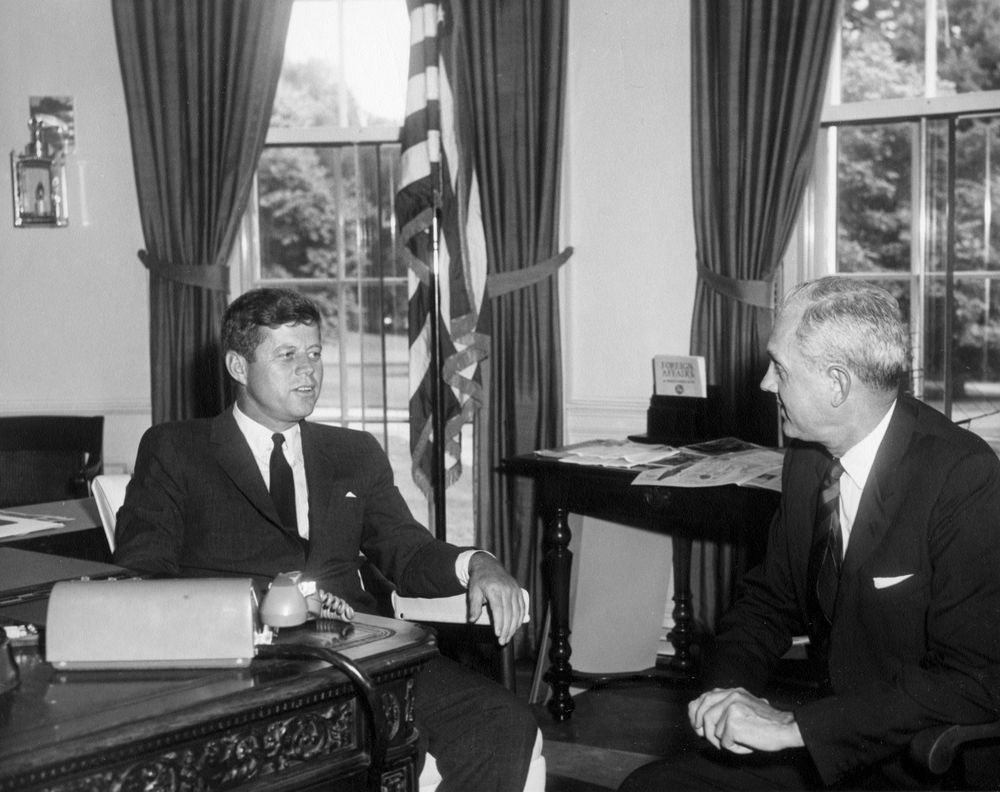
President John F. Kennedy meets with Robert M. McKinney, United States Ambassador to Switzerland. Oval Office, White House, Washington, D.C.

Robert Moody McKinney (August 28, 1910 Shattuck, Oklahoma - June 24, 2001 New York City) was the editor and publisher of The Santa Fe New Mexican and Ambassador to Switzerland and Liechtenstein under President John F. Kennedy. He also owned The Taos News, The Las Vegas Optic and The Monte Vista Journal. In addition, McKinney served as assistant secretary of the U.S. Department of Interior and U.S. ambassador to the International Atomic Energy Agency at Vienna, Austria,

== Biography ==
McKinney graduated from the University of Oklahoma with a degree in English literature. He served in the Navy during World War II, becoming a lieutenant j.g. and became financially successful by investing in bankrupt railroad stock during the Depression. After he graduated from college, he worked as an investment analyst at Standard Statistics, now Standard and Poor's, and as a partner in his cousin Robert Young's investment firm from 1934 to 1950. McKinney died of pneumonia.

== Newspaper career ==
His career in journalism started when he was a teenage reporter at The Amarillo Globe News. McKinney, bought The New Mexican in 1949 for $560,000 and sold it to Gannett in 1976. Under the terms of the sale, McKinney "would maintain editorial and managerial jurisdiction". After two years, McKinney sued Gannett for breach of contract. In 1980 the court ruled in McKinney's favor and finally, in 1987, he was restored as publisher. In 1989, he bought the paper back for his remaining Gannett stock, which was worth $33 million at the time.
