= Amadora BD =

Comic book festival held in Amadora, Portugal

Amadora BD Festival Internacional de Banda Desenhada da Amadora (FIBDA)
- Status: active
- Genre: comics
- Frequency: annual
- Venue: Fórum Luís de Camões
- Location: Amadora
- Country: Portugal
- Founded: 1989
- Most recent: October 24–November 3, 2019
- Budget: €275,000 (2011)
- Leader: Nelson Dona (2000-present)
- Organizer: Recreios da Amadora; Comissariado Amadora BD
- Website: AmadoraBD.com

Amadora BD (formerly known as FIBDA) is an annual comic book festival held in Amadora, Portugal. Founded in 1989, it is considered the most important cartoon festival in Portugal and one of the most important European competitions.

Generally, the show occurs over the course of three weeks in late October–early November.

The festival allows for the interaction between professionals and authors of different nationalities with the public, as well as holding public exhibitions, and a multitude of activities related to the "Ninth art" including panels and film showings.

Since 2000, the festival is organized around an annual theme and each year awards prizes (Prémios Nacionais de Banda Desenhada) to authors and publishers (including a "Troféu de Honra" — "Trophy of Honor").

== History ==
FIBDA (Festival Internacional de Banda Desenhada da Amadora)'s first edition was in 1990, organized by the Câmara Municipal de Amadora. The first international guest was Belgian cartoonist Morris.

Special guests of the eighth edition (1997) included Jean-Claude Mézières Pierre Christin, François Schuiten, Benoît Peeters, Enki Bilal, André Juillard, Ted Benoît, Jean Van Hamme, Theo van den Boogaard, Kevin O'Neill, and Miguelanxo Prado.

The eleventh edition of the show, held October 20–November 5, 2000, was the first one with a theme: superheroes. Guests included Rick Veitch, Dave Gibbons, Peter David, Joe Kubert, Jerry Robinson, and Luke Ross.

The 13th edition was held October 18–November 3, 2002; Michael Dean of The Comics Journal made a presentation on the "Century's Greatest Comics in the World". Guests included Chris Ware.

The fourteenth edition of the festival was held October 17-November 2, 2003, and included around 20 exhibitions.

The 2008 edition was dedicated to technology and science fiction.

In 2009 the festival officially changed its name to Amadora BD.

The 22nd edition of the show in 2011 was centered around the theme of humor; Peanuts creator Charles M. Schulz's widow Jean was a special guest, as was Shannon Wheeler.

The 28th edition of the festival was held October 27–November 12, 2017, with a focus on comics journalism; guests included Ted Rall and Josh Neufeld. Other exhibitions focused on Jack Kirby and Will Eisner.
