= List of Marathi films of 2001 =

A list of films produced by the Marathi language film industry based in Maharashtra in the year 2001.

== 2001 Releases ==
A list of Marathi films released in 2001.

Year	Film	Director	Cast	Release date	Producer	Notes	Source
2001
2001	Dhyaas Parva	Amol Palekar	Seema Biswas, Nishith Dadhich, Mohan Gokhale				
2001	Ashi Gyaneshwari	Ranjan Suryawanshi	Ramesh Bhatkar, Sharad Bhutadiya, Anand Gurav		Akstha Productions		
2001	Devki	Milind Oak	Alka Kubal, Milind Gawli, Sudhir Joshi	10 December 2001 (India)	Everest Entertainment		
2001	Akleche Kande	Ashok Chopra	Anand Abhyankar, Sanjay Bagul, Sunil Bansal		Moksh Films, Sagar Film		
