= Thomas E. Sparks =

American politician

Member of the Arkansas House of Representatives
- In office 1967–1978

Personal details
- Born: August 15, 1911 Ashley County, Arkansas, U.S.
- Died: June 29, 2001 (aged 89) Dallas County, Arkansas, U.S.
- Party: Democratic
- Education: Washington and Lee University

Thomas E. Sparks (August 15, 1911 – June 29, 2001) was an American politician. He served as a Democratic member of the Arkansas House of Representatives.

== Life and career ==
Sparks was born in Ashley County, Arkansas. He attended Washington and Lee University.

Sparks served in the Arkansas House of Representatives from 1967 to 1978.

Sparks died on June 29, 2001, at the age of 89.
