= Germán Sopeña =

Argentine writer and journalist

Germán Sopeña (7 October 1946 – 28 April 2001) was an Argentine writer and journalist. While he studied political science in Universidad del Salvador, he started to work for Editorial Abril. After obtaining his licence he moved to Europe and started to work as a correspondent for the aforementioned publishing house.

While working in Paris he obtained graduate degrees from both the Institute of Political Studies of Paris and the Sorbonne.

He worked as an editor for several magazines such as Siete días, Panorama and Parabrisas Corsa, for whom he also worked as a correspondent in France from 1977 to 1985, covering current events and following Carlos Reutemann's participation in the Formula One championship. After returning to Argentina he worked as the chief editor of Tiempo Argentino from 1985 to 1986, afterwards he joined the newspaper La Nación. It was in that newspaper where he became the chief editor of the economic section from 1986 to 1992, soon becoming one of the most recognized journalists in the newspaper.

In 1991 he obtained an Eisenhower research grant and participated in the international political seminar of Georgetown University.

Sopeña also taught journalism in the University of Belgrano.

He died on 28 April 2001, when the plane he was travelling on crashed near Roque Pérez, killing him alongside the nine other occupants. He was 55 years old.

He was married and had two daughters with his wife, Patricia Morgan.
