= José Castro (water polo) =

Uruguayan water polo player (born 1915)

Personal information
- Born: 19 February 1915 Montevideo, Uruguay
- Died: 28 June 2001 (aged 86)

Sport
- Sport: Water polo

José Castro (19 February 1915 – 28 June 2001) was a Uruguayan water polo player. He competed in the men's tournament at the 1936 Summer Olympics.
