= Donald Dorfman =

Mathematical psychologist and radiologist

- Born: June 11, 1933; Philadelphia, Pennsylvania, US
- Died: April 15, 2001 (aged 67); Iowa City, Iowa, US
- Education: University of Pennsylvania; University of Michigan
- Known for: Psychophysics; Signal detection theory
- Spouse: Lorraine Tiss Dorfman
- Children: One son, one daughter
- Scientific career
- Fields: Mathematical psychology Radiology
- Workplaces: San Diego State University (1962–8); University of Iowa (1968–2001)
- Thesis: Some effects of drive on the perceived intensity of a stimulus (1961)
- Doctoral advisor: Robert Zajonc

Donald Daniel Dorfman (June 11, 1933 – April 15, 2001) was an American mathematical psychologist and radiologist known for his research on signal detection theory.

== Education and career ==
Born in Philadelphia, Pennsylvania, Dorfman graduated Phi Beta Kappa from the University of Pennsylvania in 1954. He received his master's degree and Ph.D. from the University of Michigan in 1957 and 1961, respectively. In 1962, he joined the faculty of San Diego State University, where he remained until 1968, when he joined the University of Iowa's faculty. He became a professor of psychology at the University of Iowa in 1974 and a professor of radiology there in 1991. he died of cancer in Iowa city Iowa
