= Maura Fay =

Australian casting director

Maura Fay (12 March 1958 – 29 October 2001) was an Australian leading casting director within the entertainment industry in Australia. In 2001 she was named as one of the 25 most influential people in television and radio in Australia. In 2001 the Screen Producers Association of Australia (SPAA) Services to Industry Award was awarded posthumously to Maura. SPAA has since decided to name the award the Maura Fay Award for Services to the Industry in recognition of Maura's extraordinarily rich life and valued contributions to Australian film and television.

Maura was educated at Wynyard High School in Tasmania, where she was Head Prefect, and Hellyer College, Burnie Tas . She was of Irish heritage and spent some years working in Ireland after her schooling.

On her return to Australia she joined the Reg Grundy Organisation where she worked on the cult Australian television series Prisoner, and became Head of Casting. She later worked as Head of Production for PBL Productions and also was a consultant for the Drama Departments at the Australian Broadcasting Corporation, the Seven Network, the Nine Network and the Ten Network. Maura also served as a board member for the Sydney Film Festival and the Australian Theatre for Young People. She was also an Ambassador for Mothers Inc.

Maura started her own company, Maura Fay Casting, in 1987. She discovered many actors who became household names across Australia and internationally, including the Hollywood star Heath Ledger.

In 1990, Maura set up Maura Fay Workshops, utilising the delivery skills possessed by a professional actor to train corporate executives in communications skills. This company now operates throughout Australia, Asia and the US.
