= Filipe Melo (writer) =

Portuguese writer and musician

- Born: September 13, 1977 (age 49) Lisbon, Portugal
- Areas: Music, Comics, Film
- Notable works: Ballad for Sophie

Filipe Melo is a Portuguese musician, film director and writer.

== Early life ==
As a teenager, Filipe Melo was a computer hacker. At age 15, he was questioned by the police and he was denied access to computers for three years.

== Music ==
An accomplished jazz pianist, Melo studied at the Hotclube in Lisbon and at the Berklee College of Music with Joanne Brackeen and Ray Santisi. In Portugal, he did sideman work for many international musicians including Benny Golson, Seamus Blake, Jorge Rossy, John Ellis, Omer Avital, Peter Bernstein, Donald Harrison, Andrea Bocelli, Jesse Davis, Paulinho Braga, Sheila Jordan, Herb Geller and Martin Taylor, among many others.

He has been working as an arranger and orchestrator for many artists, and composing original soundtracks for theatre and film.

== Films ==
His first short film was I'll See You in My Dreams, which he wrote and produced, winner of Fantasporto, a Méliès d'Argent and 12 more international awards. I'll See You in My Dreams is now considered to be the first Portuguese zombie film.

He wrote and directed "Um Mundo Catita" with Manuel João Vieira, a TV show in 6 episodes, and also directed 2 music videos for the band Moonspell. He has directed two short films: "Sleepwalk" (2018) and "The Lone Wolf" (2021). Both films won the Sophia Award for Best Short by the Portuguese Film Academy.

His short film "The Lone Wolf" became the first Portuguese entry to the shortlist for the Academy Award for Best Live Action Short Film in 2023.

== Writing ==
Melo is an Eisner and Harvey nominated author - His work has been published in many countries and languages. His book, “Ballad for Sophie” that was published by Top Shelf Productions in 2021, was nominated for four Eisner awards including Best International Graphic Novel.

He also wrote The Adventures of Dog Mendonça & Pizzaboy, a series of three graphic novels Dark Horse Comics. The books feature forewords from filmmakers John Landis, George A. Romero, Tobe Hooper and Lloyd Kaufman. In 2012 he was invited to write a story for the Eisner award-winning anthology Dark Horse Presents, also featuring works by Frank Miller and Mike Mignola. In 2023, Melo and Juan Cavia published an omnibus edition of the series titled As Aventuras Completas de Dog Mendonça e Pizzaboy.
