= Slashers (film) =

2001 film by Maurice Devereaux

- DVD released by MTI Home Video
- Directed by: Maurice Devereaux
- Written by: Maurice Devereaux
- Produced by: Maurice Devereaux
- Starring: Jerry Sprio; Neil Napier; Carolina Pla; Kieran Keller; Sofia de Medeiros; Claudine Shiraishi; Christopher Piggins; Tony Curtis Blondell; Sarah Joslyn; Crowder
- Cinematography: Denis-Noel Mostert
- Edited by: Maurice Devereaux
- Music by: Martin Gauthier
- Production companies: Screen Partners; Blackwatch Entertainment
- Distributed by: Bedford Entertainment
- Release date: August 2001 (Fantasia Festival)
- Running time: 99 minutes
- Country: Canada
- Languages: English; Japanese
- Budget: $165,000

Slashers (スラッシャーズ Surasshāzu in Japan) is a 2001 slasher film written and directed by Maurice Devereaux.

== Plot ==
The latest craze is $la$her$, a Japanese blood sport game show where contestants can win millions of dollars if they survive being hunted through various arenas by costumed killers. All crimes are legal on the sets of the show, and what few rules there are (like having to remain motionless during commercials) are enforced by shock collars that the players and murderers must wear. The latest episode of $la$her$ is an all-American special in which the six contestants (Megan, Devon, Michael, Rick, Rebecca, and Brenda) will be pursued by "newbie" slasher Preacherman, and returning fan favorites Chainsaw Charlie, and Doctor Ripper.

A few minutes into the game, the contestants are scattered, with the single cameraman, Hideo, following Megan and Rebecca. The women are attacked by Preacherman, but Rebecca stabs him in the eye with a makeshift wooden stake. The victory is short-lived, as Charlie and Ripper appear, cut Rebecca in half at the waist, and terrorize Megan, who only volunteered to be on the show to protest it.

Megan rejoins the others (with the exception of Devon) and together they reach the Bridge of Death, which is situated above a pit of spikes. The group is confronted by Charlie, just as a commercial occurs. During the break, Rick reveals he plans to save the others by throwing himself and Charlie off the bridge, which causes Charlie to panic, and agree to let Rick pass. When the show returns to the air, Rick reneges on the deal, jumping off the bridge, and dragging Charlie down with him, leaving only Doctor Ripper.

In the next zone, Brenda is beheaded by Ripper, and Megan and Michael are chased to the Love Room, an area where players will be left alone if they have sex. When Megan rebuffs his advances, Michael tries to rape her, but is scared off by Devon, his screams subsequently emanating from the room he enters. Devon (who is separated from Megan) finds Michael's body, and is attacked by Ripper, who he stabs in the ear with a stake. Michael (who had faked his death) then kills Devon, takes Ripper's gear, and goes after Megan.

As he pursues Megan, Michael reveals that he is in fact a serial killer, and that he only wanted to be on $la$her$ so he could die a spectacular death, though now that he has a chance of winning the game, he is going to take it. Michaels catches up to Megan just as another commercial airs, and during the down time he brags about his history as the Bible Doll Killer, content that the rules of $la$her$ make his declarations inadmissible in court. Megan turns the tables on Michael, stating that while what he says during the live broadcast cannot be used against him, the footage recorded by the always rolling camera while they are off the air can be used as evidence.

The break ends, and Michael lunges at Megan, but is shoved away by Hideo. Distraught, Michael goes ahead with his original plan of dying on live television, and commits suicide by decapitating himself. Hideo mocks the dead Michael, asserting that Megan was bluffing, and catches up with Megan. When asked why he stopped Michael, Hideo says that while he is fine with whoever is stupid enough to volunteer to be on the show dying on it, he could not stand the thought of "that sick maniac" being back out on the streets, several million dollars richer.

Megan rants at the staff of $la$her$, threatens to use all her winnings to try to bring them down, and tells Hideo (who has asked for money, since he will probably be fired for helping her) that she will pay him if he turns the camera off. As the credits roll, the sponsors of $la$her$ are shown to be the cigarette companies Black Lung, Coffin Nails, and Cancer Man.

== Cast ==
- Sarah Joslyn Crowder as Megan Lowry, a 20-year-old law student and political activist from Seattle studying in Tokyo.
- Tony Curtis Blondell as Devon White, a 29-year-old ex-Marine and former boxer from New York City.
- Kieran Keller as Michael Gibbons, a 28-year-old computer programmer from Chicago.
- Jerry Sprio as Rick Fisher, a 32-year-old nightclub doorman from Detroit.
- Carolina Pla as Rebecca Galley, a 31-year-old fitness instructor and bodybuilder with MS from Buffalo.
- Sofia de Medeiros as Brenda Thompson, a 22-year-old aspiring actress and model from Portland.
- Claudine Shiraishi as Miho Taguchi
- Christopher Piggins as Doctor Ripper
- Neil Napier as Chainsaw Charlie and Preacherman
- Takaaki Honda as the announcer and Hideo
- Koichi Yano as the technician
- Erik Rutherford as Steve Taylor
- Shigeru Fugita as DJ Slash
- Akemi Yamagishi as the makeup girl
- Martin Quimet as Slasho the Clown
- Marco Savignac as Switchblade Sam
- David-Bernard Blanchet as Pirate Pete

== Reception ==
Rotten Tomatoes, a review aggregator, reports that 20% of five surveyed critics gave the film a positive review; the average rating was 4.2/10. Video Graveyard rated the film two and a half stars and called it "a ride that incorporates both horror and reality show clichés in a funny, gory manner" with "a great concept that is executed with confidence and does not hold back despite the budget". While it wrote that the acting was below average and the characters were unrealistic, The Worldwide Celluloid Massacre still found Slashers to be "a somewhat entertaining B movie".

Scott Weinberg of eFilmCritic heavily criticized Slashers, writing that it was boring "bargain-basement dreck" that was witless, full of shoddy gore effects and painfully amateurish acting, and was ultimately nothing more than "low-grade horror machinations at their most confoundingly stupid". Bloody Disgusting rated it 1/5 stars and wrote that the film did not live up to its promising premise. Eric Campos of Film Threat rated it 1.5/5 stars and criticized the poor dialog that dominated the film at the expense of horror.
