= Herbert Scholl =

German sailor

Herbert Scholl (12 July 1925 – 7 April 2001) was a German sailor who competed in the 1960 Summer Olympics.
