= Pol Appeltans =

Belgian footballer

Personal information
- Full name: Léopold Appeltants
- Date of birth: 30 March 1922
- Place of birth: Sint-Truiden, Belgium
- Date of death: 30 June 2001 (aged 79)
- Position: Forward

International career
| Years | Team | Apps | (Gls) |
| 1948 | Belgium | 1 | (0) |

Pol Appeltans (30 March 1922 – 30 June 2001) was a Belgian footballer. He played in one match for the Belgium national football team in 1948.
