= Plaga Zombie =

1997 Argentine horror film

Plaga zombie
- Theatrical release poster
- Directed by: Pablo Parés; Hernán Sáez
- Written by: Berta Muñiz; Pablo Parés
- Produced by: Berta Muñiz; Pablo Parés
- Starring: Berta Muñiz; Pablo Parés; Hernán Sáez; Gabriel Grieco
- Cinematography: Pablo Parés; Hernán Sáez
- Edited by: Pablo Parés; Hernán Sáez
- Music by: Pablo Vostrouski
- Distributed by: Farsa Producciones; EuroVideo
- Release date: 1997
- Running time: 69 minute
- Country: Argentina
- Language: Spanish

Plaga Zombie (English: Zombie Plague) is a 1997 Argentine horror film directed by Pablo Parés and Hernán Sáez, the former of whom wrote the film with Berta Muñiz; all three also star in the film. It is the first entry in the Plaga Zombie film series being followed up with Plaga Zombie: Zona Mutante (2001), Plaga Zombie: Zona Mutante – Revolución Tóxica (2012), and Plaga Zombie: American Invasion (2021).

== Cast ==
The filmmakers used common household items such as cake mix and food coloring for the zombie make up in Plaga Zombie.

- Berta Muñiz as John West
- Pablo Parés as Bill Johnson
- Hernán Sáez as Max Giggs
- Walter Cornás as Mike Taylor
- Paulo Soria as Zombie, FBI, Punk, etc.
- Gabriel Grieco as Richard Gecko
- Diego Parés as Willie Boxer
- Martín Lepera as Albert el pizzero
- Esteban Podetti as James Dana
- Pablo Fayó as David Fox
