= Felle Delgado =

Puerto Rican baseball player (born 1909)

Félix Rafael "Felle" Delgado
- Born: March 31, 1909; Coamo, Puerto Rico
- Died: July 31, 2001 (aged 87); Rio Piedras, Puerto Rico
- Batted: Right Threw: Right

Félix Rafael "Felle" Delgado (March 31, 1909 – June 13, 2001) was a Puerto Rican Negro leagues baseball player. He was born in Coamo City, Puerto Rico. Delgado played for the New York Cubans, and later for the San Juan Senators. His career lasted from 1933 to 1942. He was later a major league scout for the Kansas City Athletics 1968 to 1970 and Milwaukee Brewers from 1970 to 1997, and scouted players like Félix Millán. Served in the United States Army during World War II
