= Pablo Parés =

Argentine film director and actor (born 1978)

Pablo Parés (born August 28, 1978, in Haedo, Buenos Aires Province) is an Argentine film director, producer, actor, cinematographer, screenwriter and film editor best known for his work in the horror film genre.

He has directed and produced over 20 films. He is especially noted for directing the Plaga Zombie comedy horror film series—Plaga Zombie (1997), Plaga Zombie: Zona Mutante (2001), and Plaga Zombie: Revolución Tóxica (2012)—which he also produced, starred in and wrote.

== Selected filmography ==
Year	Film	Director	Writer	Producer	Actor	Notes	Ref(s)
1997	Plaga Zombie	Co-director	Co-writer	Co-producer	Yes	Also co-editor	
2000	Nunca asistas a este tipo de fiestas	Co-director	Co-writer	Co-producer			
2001	Plaga Zombie: Zona Mutante	Co-director	Co-writer	Co-producer	Yes		
2004	Jennifer's Shadow	Co-director	Co-writer			Also known as Chronicle of the Raven	
2007	Filmatron	Yes	Co-writer				
2009	100% lucha, el amo de los clones	Co-director	Co-writer				
2009	Kapanga todoterreno	Co-director	Co-writer				
2010	Nunca más asistas a este tipo de fiestas	Co-director	Co-writer		Yes		
2010	Post: La aventura completa	Co-director	Co-writer	Co-producer	Yes	Also co-editor	
2011	Plaga Zombie: Zona Mutante – Revolución Tóxica	Co-director	Co-writer		Yes		
2011	Daemonium	Yes				Short film	
2013	Cichonga	Guest director	Co-writer		Yes		
2015	Daemonium: Underground Soldier	Yes	Co-writer	Co-producer			
2015	Grasa	Co-director	Co-writer	Executive			
2018	Bruno Motoneta	Yes					
2018	Soy tóxico (I Am Toxic)	Yes	Co-writer				
2021	Plaga Zombie: American Invasion	Guest director			Yes		
2021	PussyCake	Yes					
