= Plaga zombie: zona mutante =

2001 film by Pablo Parés

- Directed by: Pablo Parés; Hernán Sáez
- Written by: Pablo Parés; Hernán Sáez
- Produced by: Berta Muñiz; Pablo Parés; Hernán Sáez
- Starring: Berta Muñiz; Pablo Parés; Hernán Sáez; Gabriel Grieco
- Cinematography: Pablo Parés; Hernán Sáez
- Edited by: Hernán Sáez
- Music by: Pablo Vostrouski
- Distributed by: Farsa Producciones; EuroVideo
- Release date: December 21, 2001
- Running time: 105 minute
- Country: Argentina
- Language: Spanish

Plaga zombie: zona mutante is a 2001 Argentine horror film written and directed Pablo Parés and Hernán Sáez, who star in the film along with Berta Muñiz. It is the second entry in the Plaga Zombie film series and the sequel to the 1997 film Plaga Zombie. It was followed by the third and final film, Plaga Zombie: Revolución Tóxica (2012).

== Cast ==
- Berta Muñiz as John West
- Pablo Parés as Bill Johnson
- Hernán Sáez as Max Giggs
- Paulo Soria as Max Fan
- Esteban Podetti as James Dana
- Sebastian Tabany as Rebelde
- Alejandro Nagy as FBI chief
- Daniel de la Vega as Lider Rebelde
- Nicanor Loreti as Zombie
- Luis Emilio Lucchesi as Chico Escupida
- Germán Magariños as Zombie
- Martin Villagra as Zombie (as Carlos Manuel Horazzi)
