= Berta Muñiz =

Argentine film actor and film producer

Sebastián "Berta" Muñiz (July 21, 1978 – in Buenos Aires) is an Argentine film actor and film producer best known for his work in the horror film genre.

== Career ==
He entered film in 1991 in New York Cop and has appeared in nearly 30 films since. He is particularly notable for his role in the Plaga Zombie horror film trilogy - Plaga Zombie (1997), Plaga Zombie: Zona Mutante (2001), and Plaga Zombie: Revolución Tóxica (2012) - which he also produced.

== Filmography ==
El mejor infarto de mi vida (2025)

- Promedio Rojo 2 "Mis peores Amigos" (2013)... Papitas, Massera
- Griscelda (2006) .... Asistente
- Tengo el poder (2005) .... Carlos
- Filmatron (2005) .... Gordo Hector
- Hada buena – Una fábula peronista, El (2005) .... Examinador
- Película de Francisco, La (2005) .... Die
- ¡Yok! (2005) .... L.A.
- Promedio rojo (2004) (as Sebastián 'Berta' Muñiz) .... Papitas, Massera
- Noin (2003) .... Noin
- Amigos del demonio (2002)
- Plaga zombie: Zona mutante (2001) (V) .... John West
- Vacaciones en la Tierra (2001) (V) .... Max
- Bar imperial (2001) .... Pibe
- Nunca asistas a este tipo de fiestas (2000) (V) .... Coronel Santoro
- Nathán: El peluche asesino (2000) .... Él mismo (episodio 'Programación maldita')
- Rockabilly (2000) (V) .... Hombre de la barra de hielo
- Cucaracha (1999)
- Cortos de las chicas de enfrente (1998)
- Demonios municipales (1998)
- No pizza (1998)
- Plaga zombie (1997) (V) .... John West
- Cama, La (1996)
- Hotel paraíso (1996)
- Ataque del vampiro espacial, El (1995)
- Bajo el poder de la garra maldita (1995)
- Hombre rata, El (1994)
- Mutantes compactos (1994)
- Farsatoons (1993)
- Trilogía de hijo de puta (1993)
- New York Cop (1992)
- plaga zombie: zona mutante: revolucion toxica (2011)
