= Leonard Tepper =

American actor and comedian

- Born: July 3, 1939; New York City, New York, USA
- Died: June 7, 2001 (aged 61); New York City, New York, USA
- Occupation: Actor • comedian
- Years active: 1986−1998

Leonard Tepper (July 3, 1939 – June 7, 2001) was an American actor and comedian known for his frequent cameo appearances on the Late Show with David Letterman between 1994 and 1998. His filmography includes Home Alone 2: Lost in New York, Class of Nuke'Em High, and The Shaman. He also appeared in a Miller Lite commercial and the video for Mariah Carey's Fantasy.

== Early life ==
He graduated from Thomas Jefferson High School in Brooklyn, New York in 1956.

== Filmography ==
Year	Title	Role	Notes
1986	Class of Nuke 'Em High	Bald Teacher	
1988	The Shaman	Criminal #2	
1990	Awakenings	Ward #5 Patient #5	
1992	Home Alone 2: Lost in New York	Sleeping Man	
1996	Night Falls on Manhattan	Juror	Uncredited, (final film role)
