= Germán Magariños =

Argentina film director, actor (born 1978)

Germán Magariños (born 13 May 1978) is an Argentine film director, film producer, screenwriter, bassist and actor.

== Filmwork ==
All Magariños movies are extremely low-budget violent productions considered gore horror comedies or splatterpunk, being Ed Wood and Lloyd Kaufman his main influences. In 2005 his movie Goreinvasion won the Dogpile award given by Troma Films. "Sadomaster" was released worldwide in 2006 by SRS Cinema. In 2008 he directed "Un Cazador de Zombis". He founded and owns the production company Gorevision films.

== Music ==
Magariños is the bassist of Argentinian heavy metal band Velocidad 22.

== Filmography ==
- El sidras, el joto y el cerdo

Otra navidad del espanto (2024)

- Noche de Paz, Noche de Muerte IX: Prohibido decir cerdo (2023)
- El macaco asesino en la navidad del espanto (2022)
- Masacre en la navidad del Infierno (2021)
- Especial Navideño 2020 "Caneticus, el esperpento Navideño" (2020)
- Covid 19 Zombi Canibales del Infierno (2020)
- 2020 Covid 19 Zombi Masacre (2020)
- El Sidras (2019)
- Infernicus (2019)
- Velocidad 22: Gira Bolivia-Peru (y Jujuy!) (2019)
- Esperando la Carnosa (2018)
- Starwars: Goretech (2018)
- Lechon Kai (TV Mini Series) (5 episodes) (2018)
- La Fiesta de Todes (2017)
- Pesadija Navideña del Horror: Feladelfia (2017)
- Corazón de lechón (2017)
- Pesadija navideña 3: El espanto surge de la tomba (2016)
- Vidiodromo (2016)
- Cafetera perdida (2016)
- Zombi apocalipsis sensuale 2: Zombis nazis en la yungla (2016)
- Pedro Osuna salva la navidad (2015)
- Scanners: Dopplegayners (2015)
- La perinola del horror (2015)
- They Call Him One Eye Faggot (2015)
- Pesadija sangrienta: la masacre de navidad (2014)
- Robin Frut (2014)
- Los Super bonaerenses (2014)
- El enigma de otro fruto (2014)
- Poltergays: Pesadija en lo profundo del recto (2013)
- Zombi Apocalipsis Sensuale (2013)
- Profondo Trosso (2013)
- Alan Smithee's Frankenstein (2012)
- Goretech: Bienvenidos al planeta hijo de puta (2012)
- Poltergays 5: los lobos desnudos de las ss (2011)
- Poltergays 2: masacre en la pijamada (2011)
- Sadomaster 2: Locura General (2011)
- Actividad subnormal (2010)
- Alan Smithee's Nosferatu (2009)
- Fin de semana en lo de Cicuta (2009)
- Un Cazador de Zombis (2008)
- Sadomaster (2005) Distributed in USA by SRS Cinema
- Goreinvasión (2004)
- Vio la luna... y compró un cementerio (2003)
- La Sangre de Frankenstein (aka LSD Frankenstein) (2002)
- Holocausto Cannabis - USA title: Cannabis Holocaust: Mutant Hell (2001)
