= List of awards and nominations received by Eduard Fernández =

Eduard Fernández awards and nominations
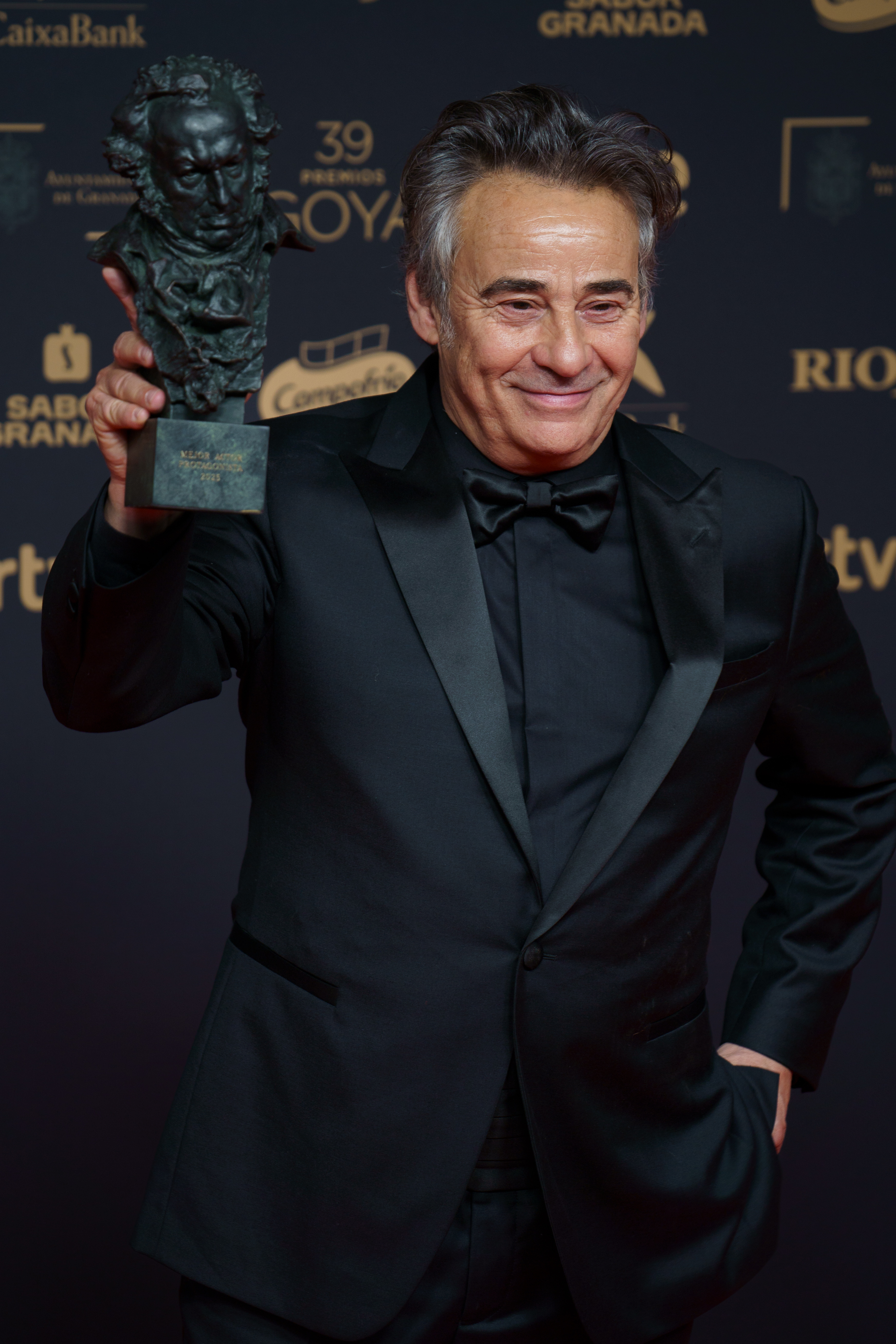
- Fernández at the 2025 Goya Awards
Awards and nominations
Award	Wins	Nominations
Goya Awards	4	14
Gaudí Awards	5	12
Actors and Actresses Union Awards	3	8

Spanish actor Eduard Fernández has received several awards including four Goya Awards, five Gaudí Awards, and the Silver Shell for Best Actor. He is the second-most awarded actor at the Goyas (after Javier Bardem) and, with 14 nominations, is also the second-most nominated actor (after Antonio de la Torre).

Fernández won the Goya Award for Best Actor twice for his roles as a contemporary version of Mephistopheles in the psychological thriller Fausto 5.0 (2001) and as the Catalan impostor Enric Marco in the biographical drama Marco, the Invented Truth (2024). He won the Goya Award for Best Supporting Actor twice for his roles as an introverted architect in the Cesc Gay urban drama In the City (2003) and as Spanish Legion founder Millán Astray in the historical drama While at War (2019).

He won the Silver Shell for Best Actor for his portrayal of the spy Francisco Paesa in Smoke & Mirrors (2016).

== Industry associations and guilds ==
=== Goya Awards ===
Goya Awards (Spain)
Edition	Category	Nominated work	Result	Ref.
14th (2000)	Best New Actor	Washington Wolves	Nominated	
16th (2002)	Best Actor	Fausto 5.0	Won	
16th (2002)	Best Supporting Actor	Sound of the Sea	Nominated	
18th (2004)	Best Supporting Actor	In the City	Won	
19th (2005)	Best Actor	Things That Make Living Worthwhile	Nominated	
20th (2006)	Best Actor	The Method	Nominated	
25th (2011)	Best Supporting Actor	Biutiful	Nominated	
28th (2014)	Best Actor	All the Women	Nominated	
29th (2015)	Best Supporting Actor	El Niño	Nominated	
31st (2017)	Best Actor	Smoke & Mirrors	Nominated	
33rd (2019)	Best Supporting Actor	Everybody Knows	Nominated	
34th (2020)	Best Supporting Actor	While at War	Won	
36th (2022)	Best Actor	Mediterraneo: The Law of the Sea	Nominated	
39th (2025)	Best Actor	Marco, the Invented Truth	Won	

=== Gaudí Awards ===
Gaudí Awards (Catalonia)
Edition	Category	Nominated work	Result	Ref.
2nd (2010)	Best Actor	Three Days With the Family	Nominated	
3rd (2011)	Best Actor	The Mosquito Net	Won	
5th (2013)	Best Supporting Actor	A Gun in Each Hand	Won	
6th (2014)	Best Actor	All the Women	Nominated	
7th (2015)	Best Supporting Actor	El Niño	Won	
9th (2017)	Best Actor	Smoke & Mirrors	Won	
11th (2019)	Best Supporting Actor	Everybody Knows	Nominated	
12th (2020)	Best Actor	A Thief's Daughter	Nominated	
12th (2020)	Best Supporting Actor	While at War	Nominated	
14th (2022)	Best Actor	Mediterraneo: The Law of the Sea	Nominated	
15th (2023)	Best Supporting Actor	God's Crooked Lines	Nominated	
17th (2025)	Best Actor	The 47	Won	

=== Lola Gaos Awards ===
Lola Gaos Awards (Valencian Community)
Edition	Category	Nominated work	Result	Ref.
9th (2026)	Best Actor	The Bad Father	Pending	

=== Actors and Actresses Union Awards ===
Actors and Actresses Union Awards (Spain)
Edition	Category	Nominated work	Result	Ref.
13th (2004)	Best Film Actor in a Secondary Role	In the City	Won	
14th (2005)	Best Film Actor in a Leading Role	Things That Make Living Worthwhile	Nominated	
15th (2006)	Best Film Actor in a Secondary Role	The Method	Won	
18th (2009)	Best Film Actor in a Secondary Role	Before the Fall	Nominated	
20th (2011)	Best Film Actor in a Secondary Role	Biutiful	Nominated	
22nd (2013)	Best Film Actor in a Secondary Role	A Gun in Each Hand	Nominated	
29th (2020)	Best Film Actor in a Secondary Role	While at War	Nominated	
33rd (2025)	Best Film Actor in a Leading Role	Marco, the Invented Truth	Won	

=== Max Awards ===
Max Awards (Spain)
Edition	Category	Nominated work	Result	Ref.
10th (2007)	Best Actor	Hamlet	Won	
27th (2024)	Best Actor	Todas las canciones de amor	Won	

=== Platino Awards ===
Platino Awards (Ibero-America)
Edition	Category	Nominated work	Result	Ref.
4th (2017)	Best Actor	Smoke & Mirrors	Nominated	
8th (2021)	Best Actor in a Miniseries or TV series	30 Coins	Nominated	
9th (2022)	Best Actor	Mediterraneo: The Law of the Sea	Nominated	
12th (2025)	Best Actor	Marco, the Invented Truth	Won	
13th (2026)	Best Supporting Actor in a Miniseries or TV series	The Anatomy of a Moment	Nominated	

=== Forqué Awards ===
Forqué Awards (Spain)
Edition	Category	Nominated work	Result	Ref.
16th (2011)	Best Actor in a Film	The Mosquito Net	Nominated	
19th (2014)	Best Actor in a Film	All the Women	Won	
22nd (2017)	Best Actor in a Film	Smoke & Mirrors	Nominated	
27th (2021)	Best Actor in a Film	Mediterraneo: The Law of the Sea	Nominated	
30th (2024)	Best Actor in a Film	Marco, the Invented Truth	Won	
32nd (2026)	Best Actor in a Film	The Bad Father	Pending	
32nd (2026)	Best Actor in a Series	Killing a Bear	Pending	

== Critics and screen journalists' associations and circles ==
=== Feroz Awards ===
Feroz Awards (Spain)
Edition	Category	Nominated work	Result	Ref.
1st (2014)	Best Main Actor in a Film	All the Women	Nominated	
2nd (2015)	Best Supporting Actor in a Film	El Niño	Nominated	
4th (2017)	Best Main Actor in a Film	Smoke & Mirrors	Nominated	
5th (2018)	Best Main Actor in a Series	La zona	Nominated	
6th (2019)	Best Supporting Actor in a Film	Everybody Knows	Nominated	
7th (2020)	Best Supporting Actor in a Film	While at War	Nominated	
7th (2020)	Best Supporting Actor in a Series	Criminal: Spain	Nominated	
8th (2021)	Best Main Actor in a Series	30 Coins	Won	
9th (2022)	Best Main Actor in a Film	Mediterraneo: The Law of the Sea	Nominated	
12th (2025)	Best Main Actor in a Film	Marco, the Invented Truth	Won	
13th (2026)	Best Supporting Actor in a Series	The Anatomy of a Moment	Nominated	

=== CEC Medals ===
CEC Medals (Spain)
Edition	Category	Nominated work	Result	Ref.
72nd (2017)	Best Actor	Smoke & Mirrors	Won	
73rd (2018)	Best Actor	Perfect Strangers	Nominated	
74th (2019)	Best Supporting Actor	Everybody Knows	Nominated	
75th (2020)	Best Supporting Actor	While at War	Won	
77th (2022)	Best Actor	Mediterraneo: The Law of the Sea	Nominated	
80th (2025)	Best Actor	Marco, the Invented Truth	Won	
80th (2025)	Best Actor	The 47	Nominated	

== Competitive festival awards ==
=== San Sebastián International Film Festival ===
San Sebastián International Film Festival
Edition	Category	Nominated work	Result	Ref.
64th (2016)	Silver Shell for Best Actor	Smoke & Mirrors	Won	

=== Sitges Film Festival ===
Sitges Film Festival
Edition	Category	Nominated work	Result	Ref.
34th (2001)	Best Actor	Fausto 5.0	Won	

=== Málaga Film Festival ===
Málaga Film Festival
Edition	Category	Nominated work	Result	Ref.
5th (2002)	Silver Biznaga for Best Actor	Smoking Room	Won	
8th (2005)	Silver Biznaga for Best Actor	Ants in the Mouth	Won	
12th (2009)	Silver Biznaga for Best Actor	Three Days With the Family	Won	

== Myscellaneous ==
- Gold Medal of Merit in the Fine Arts (2024)
