= 2026 in Spanish television =

This is a list of Spanish television related events from 2026.

== Television shows ==
=== Shows expected to debut in 2026 ===
Title	Channel / platform	Debut date	Performers / host	Genre	Ref.
Pura sangre	Telecinco	28 January	Ángela Molina, Pep Munné, Amaia Salamanca, Aitor Luna, Blanca Romero	Family drama	
Salvador	Netflix	6 February	Luis Tosar, Claudia Salas	Action drama	
Rafaela y su loco mundo	Atresplayer	15 February	Ingrid García-Jonsson	Surrealist comedy	
That Night	Netflix	13 March	Clara Galle, Claudia Salas, Paula Usero	Thriller	
Day One	Prime Video	13 March	Álex González, Alba Planas, Asier Etxeandia	Techno-thriller	
Por cien millones	Movistar Plus	26 March	Raúl Arévalo, Vito Sanz, Gabriel Guevara	Comedy-drama	
If It's Tuesday, It's Murder	Disney+	31 March	Álex García, Inma Cuesta, Ana Wagener, Biel Montoro	Mystery comedy	
La nena	Atresplayer	12 April	Lucía Martín Abelló, Nerea Barros	Crime thriller	
Hope's Corner	La 1	19 April	Mariona Terés	Social comedy	
I Always Sometimes	Movistar Plus	23 April	Ana Boga	Drama	
The Tribute	SkyShowtime	23 April	Eusebio Poncela, Ángela Molina, Elsa Pataky	Family thriller	
Naughty Business	Prime Video	24 April	Malena Alterio, Celia Morán, Álvaro Mel	Comedy	
Many People Need to Die	Movistar Plus	21 May	Anna Castillo, Laura Weissmahr, Macarena García	Comedy	
Ella, maldita alma	Telecinco	18 June	Maxi Iglesias, Karina Kolokolchykova, Martiño Rivas	Romance	
The Castle	Movistar Plus	8 October	Raúl Arévalo, Valentina Vidal, Omar Ayuso	Crime drama	
Fading Grandeur	Netflix	23 October	Antonio de la Torre, Alexandra Jiménez	Comedy	
Killing a Bear	Movistar Plus	10 December	Eduard Fernández, Maria Rodríguez Soto, Miki Esparbé	Thriller	
