= List of Amazon Prime Video original programming =

In 2013, Amazon began distributing original television shows through its Amazon Prime Video service, some of which are developed in-house by Amazon Studios (now Amazon MGM Studios).

== Original programming ==
=== Drama ===
Title	Genre	Premiere	Seasons	Status
Reacher	Crime drama	February 4, 2022	4 seasons, 32 episodes	Renewed for seasons 5–6
The Terminal List	Action drama	July 1, 2022	2 seasons, 16 episodes	Pending
The Lord of the Rings: The Rings of Power	Fantasy	September 1, 2022	3 seasons, 24 episodes	Season 3 ongoing
The Devil's Hour	Thriller	October 28, 2022	2 seasons, 11 episodes	Season 3 due to premiere on December 4, 2026
Citadel	Spy drama	April 28, 2023	2 seasons, 13 episodes	Pending
Fallout	Post-apocalyptic drama	April 10, 2024	2 seasons, 16 episodes	Renewed
Cross	Crime thriller	November 14, 2024	2 seasons, 16 episodes	Renewed
House of David (Note: Episodes premiere through the Wonder Project subscription service, and are released on Prime Video globally at a later date.)	Religious drama	February 27, 2025	2 seasons, 16 episodes	Renewed for final season
We Were Liars	Psychological thriller	June 18, 2025	1 season, 8 episodes	Renewed
Ballard	Detective fiction	July 9, 2025	1 season, 10 episodes	Renewed
Steal	Heist thriller	January 21, 2026	1 season, 6 episodes	Pending
56 Days	Erotic thriller	February 18, 2026	1 season, 8 episodes	Pending
Young Sherlock	Mystery thriller	March 4, 2026	1 season, 8 episodes	Renewed
Scarpetta	Crime drama	March 11, 2026	1 season, 8 episodes	Renewed
Off Campus	Young adult romance	May 13, 2026	1 season, 8 episodes	Season 2 due to premiere on April 28, 2027
Every Year After	Romantic drama	June 10, 2026	1 season, 8 episodes	Renewed
Sterling Point	Teen drama	August 5, 2026	1 season, 8 episodes	Renewed
Neagley	Crime drama	September 16, 2026	1 season, 8 episodes	Renewed
Carrie	Supernatural horror	October 7, 2026	1 season, 8 episodes	Renewed
Awaiting release
Blade Runner 2099	Science fiction	November 25, 2026	8 episodes	Miniseries
Criminal	Crime drama	January 13, 2027	1 season, 8 episodes	Pending
Bloodaxe	Historical drama	January 20, 2027	1 season, 8 episodes	Renewed

=== Comedy ===
Title	Genre	Premiere	Seasons	Status
Deadloch	Comedy	June 2, 2023	2 seasons, 14 episodes	Pending
Mr. & Mrs. Smith	Spy comedy	February 2, 2024	1 season, 8 episodes	Renewed
Overcompensating	Comedy	May 15, 2025	1 season, 8 episodes	Season 2 due to premiere on February 17, 2027
Bait	Comedy	March 25, 2026	1 season, 6 episodes	Pending
Elle	Teen comedy drama	July 1, 2026	1 season, 8 episodes	Renewed
Awaiting release
Barbershop	Workplace comedy	February 10, 2027	1 season, 8 episodes	Pending

=== Animation ===
==== Adult animation ====
Title	Genre	Premiere	Seasons	Status
Invincible	Superhero drama	March 25, 2021	4 seasons, 33 episodes	Season 5 due to premiere on February 17, 2027; Renewed
The Legend of Vox Machina	Fantasy action	January 28, 2022	4 seasons, 48 episodes	Renewed for final season
Hazbin Hotel	Musical black comedy	January 19, 2024	2 seasons, 16 episodes	Renewed for seasons 3–5 (final)
Batman: Caped Crusader	Superhero	August 1, 2024	2 seasons, 20 episodes	Pending
Secret Level	Action/Science fantasy anthology	December 10, 2024	1 season, 15 episodes	Renewed
#1 Happy Family USA	Comedy	April 17, 2025	1 season, 8 episodes	Renewed
The Mighty Nein	Fantasy action	November 19, 2025	1 season, 8 episodes	Season 2 due to premiere on March 24, 2027

==== Anime ====
Title	Genre	Premiere	Seasons	Status
Devils' Crest	Science fantasy	November 6, 2026	1 season, 4 episodes	Season 1 ongoing

=== Non-English language scripted ===
==== French ====
Title	Genre	Premiere	Seasons	Status
Culte	Historical drama anthology	October 18, 2024	2 seasons, 12 episodes	Pending
The Glass House	Comedy drama	May 1, 2026	1 season, 6 episodes	Pending
Campus Drivers	Young adult romance	November 6, 2026	1 season, 6 episodes	Pending

==== Hindi ====
Title	Genre	Premiere	Seasons	Status
The Family Man	Spy thriller	September 20, 2019	3 seasons, 26 episodes	Pending
Panchayat	Comedy drama	April 3, 2020	4 seasons, 32 episodes	Season 5 due to premiere on December 3, 2026
Farzi	Black comedy crime thriller	February 10, 2023	1 season, 8 episodes	Renewed
Sapne Vs Everyone	Drama	December 8, 2023	2 seasons, 10 episodes	Pending
Call Me Bae	Comedy drama	September 6, 2024	1 season, 8 episodes	Renewed
Dupahiya	Comedy	March 7, 2025	2 seasons, 17 episodes	Pending
Daldal	Crime thriller	January 30, 2026	1 season, 7 episodes	Pending
Bandwaale	Musical comedy drama	February 13, 2026	1 season, 8 episodes	Pending
Maa Ka Sum	Drama	April 3, 2026	1 season, 8 episodes	Pending
Matka King	Historical crime drama	April 17, 2026	1 season, 8 episodes	Renewed
Lukkhe	Crime drama	May 8, 2026	1 season, 8 episodes	Pending
The Pyramid Scheme	Drama	June 5, 2026	1 season, 7 episodes	Pending
Raakh	Crime thriller	June 13, 2026	1 season, 8 episodes	Pending
Adarsh Baal Vidyalaya	Drama	July 24, 2026	1 season, 7 episodes	Renewed for seasons 2–3

==== Japanese ====
Title	Genre	Premiere	Seasons	Status
The Silent Service	Military political thriller	February 9, 2024	2 seasons, 16 episodes	Renewed
Rock, Paper, Landmines	Teen mystery drama	November 13, 2026	1 season, 6 episodes	Pending
Awaiting release
Quiz from God	Medical crime drama	December 4, 2026	TBA	Pending

==== Spanish ====
Title	Genre	Premiere	Seasons	Status
Club Hooligans	Sports drama	June 23, 2023	2 seasons, 16 episodes	Pending
Red Queen	Crime thriller	February 29, 2024	1 season, 7 episodes	Renewed for seasons 2–3
Betty, la fea: la historia continúa	Romantic comedy	July 19, 2024	3 seasons, 30 episodes	Renewed for final season
No One Will Miss Us	Teen drama	August 9, 2024	2 seasons, 16 episodes	Renewed
Her Majesty	Comedy	February 27, 2025	1 season, 7 episodes	Renewed
Menem	Political drama	July 9, 2025	1 season, 6 episodes	Renewed
La oficina	Sitcom	March 13, 2026	1 season, 8 episodes	Renewed
Animal Love	Crime drama	March 20, 2026	1 season, 8 episodes	Pending
Naughty Business	Dark comedy	April 24, 2026	1 season, 8 episodes	Pending
The House of the Spirits	Historical drama/Magical realism	April 29, 2026	1 season, 8 episodes	Pending
The Trial	Crime drama	September 11, 2026	1 season, 8 episodes	Pending
I Would Rather Die	Comedy horror	October 2, 2026	1 season, 8 episodes	Pending

==== Other ====
Title	Genre	Premiere	Seasons	Language	Status
Vadhandhi: The Fable of Velonie	Crime thriller	December 2, 2022	2 seasons, 16 episodes	Tamil	Pending
New Bandits	Crime drama	August 18, 2023	2 seasons, 15 episodes	Portuguese	Pending
That Cover Girl	Romantic drama	October 19, 2023	1 season, 6 episodes	Malay	Renewed
Fading Gigolo: The Sex Guru	Comedy	December 21, 2023	2 seasons, 12 episodes	Italian	Pending
Maxton Hall—The World Between Us	Teen drama	May 9, 2024	2 seasons, 12 episodes	German	Final season due to premiere on December 9, 2026
Love Is Never Gone	Romantic drama	May 8, 2026	1 season, 14 episodes	Filipino	Pending
Jagamae Sangeetham	Drama	September 4, 2026	1 season, 8 episodes	Telugu	Pending

=== Unscripted ===
==== Docuseries ====
Title	Subject	Premiere	Seasons	Language	Status
The Grand Tour	Motoring	November 18, 2016	7 seasons, 52 episodes	English	Pending
The Test	Sports	March 12, 2020	3 seasons, 15 episodes	English	Renewed
Clarkson's Farm	Agriculture	June 11, 2021	5 seasons, 40 episodes	English	Renewed
Faceoff: Inside the NHL	Sports	October 4, 2024	2 seasons, 12 episodes	English	Pending
Molly-Mae: Behind It All	Celebrity/Lifestyle	January 17, 2025	2 seasons, 12 episodes	English	Pending
One Night in Idaho: The College Murders	True crime	July 11, 2025	1 season, 4 episodes	English	Season 2 due to premiere on December 28, 2026
Awaiting release
The Boy Who Stole Billions?	White-collar crime	November 30, 2026	3 episodes	English	Miniseries

==== Reality ====
Title	Genre	Premiere	Seasons	Language	Status
LOL: Last One Laughing Italy	Stand-up comedy competition	February 26, 2021	6 seasons, 37 episodes	Italian	Pending
LOL: Last One Laughing Germany	Stand-up comedy competition	April 1, 2021	6 seasons, 37 episodes	German	Pending
LOL: Qui rit, sort!	Stand-up comedy competition	April 22, 2021	6 seasons, 39 episodes	French	Pending
LOL - Last One Laughing Spain	Stand-up comedy competition	May 13, 2021	2 seasons, 12 episodes	Spanish	Season 3 due to premiere on December 25, 2026
LOL: Last One Laughing Brazil	Stand-up comedy competition	December 3, 2021	5 seasons, 30 episodes	Portuguese	Pending
LOL: Last One Laughing Quebec	Stand-up comedy competition	January 6, 2023	4 seasons, 24 episodes	French	Renewed
LOL: Last One Laughing Netherlands	Stand-up comedy competition	January 20, 2023	4 seasons, 24 episodes	Dutch	Pending
LOL: Last One Laughing Argentina	Stand-up comedy competition	March 17, 2023	3 seasons, 18 episodes	Spanish	Pending
LOL: Last One Laughing Poland	Stand-up comedy competition	April 14, 2023	4 seasons, 24 episodes	Polish	Pending
LOL: Last One Laughing Colombia	Stand-up comedy competition	August 11, 2023	2 seasons, 12 episodes	Spanish	Pending
007: Road to a Million	Survival competition	November 10, 2023	2 seasons, 16 episodes	English	Pending
Pombo	Docu-soap	November 28, 2023	5 seasons, 26 episodes	Spanish	Pending
LOL: Last One Laughing Philippines	Stand-up comedy competition	July 4, 2024	2 seasons, 12 episodes	Filipino	Season 2 ongoing
Beast Games	Survival competition	December 19, 2024	2 seasons, 20 episodes	English	Season 3 due to premiere on January 13, 2027
Red Carpet Survival	Survival competition	January 9, 2025	2 seasons, 8 episodes	Italian	Pending
LOL: Last One Laughing UK	Stand-up comedy competition	March 20, 2025	2 seasons, 12 episodes	English	Pending
June Farms	Docu-reality	November 17, 2025	1 season, 8 episodes	English	Renewed
LOL: In Real Life!	Prank competition	November 21, 2025	1 season, 4 episodes	French	Pending
Trainer Games	Survival competition	January 8, 2026	1 season, 6 episodes	English	Pending
LOL Talent Show: Mexico	Stand-up comedy competition	January 16, 2026	1 season, 4 episodes	Spanish	Pending
The CEO Club	Docu-reality	February 23, 2026	1 season, 8 episodes	English	Pending
American Gladiators	Reality competition	April 17, 2026	1 season, 10 episodes	English	Pending
Alliance	Reality competition	June 26, 2026	1 season, 47 episodes	Hindi	Pending
Would You Rather: Decide to Survive	Reality competition	June 26, 2026	1 season, 6 episodes	English	Pending
Young Farts Trailer Parts	Comedy docu-reality	July 17, 2026	1 season, 6 episodes	English	Pending
The Chosen in the Wild with Bear Grylls	Survival competition	August 9, 2026	1 season, 6 episodes	English	Pending
Last One Laughing: Halloween UK	Stand-up comedy competition	October 23, 2026	1 season, 3 episodes	English	Pending
Awaiting release
Alan Carr's Great Big Bucket List	Comedy docu-reality	November 27, 2026	TBA	English	Pending
Kaleb Off the Farm	Reality	January 8, 2027	1 season, 4 episodes	English	Pending
Fallout Shelter: The Experiment	Reality competition	January 13, 2027	1 season, 10 episodes	English	Pending

==== Variety ====
Title	Genre	Premiere	Seasons	Language	Status
Good Sports with Kevin Hart and Kenan Thompson	Sports talk show	November 25, 2025	1 season, 12 episodes	English	Pending

=== Co-productions ===
These shows have been commissioned by Amazon in cooperation with a partner network.

Title	Genre	Partner	Premiere	Seasons	Language	Status
The Seven Knights of the Marronnier Kingdom	Historical fantasy anime	NHK Educational TV/Japan	October 3, 2026	1 season, 20 episodes	Japanese	Season 1 ongoing

=== Continuations ===
These shows have been picked up by Amazon for additional seasons after having aired previous seasons on another network.

Title	Genre	Prev. network(s)	Premiere	Seasons	Language	Status
Tribunal Justice (seasons 2–3)	Arbitration-based reality court show	Amazon Freevee	January 27, 2025	2 seasons, 160 episodes	English	Pending
The Chosen (seasons 5–6)	Religious drama	VidAngel (season 1); Angel Studios (seasons 2–3); TheChosen.tv (season 4)	June 15, 2025	2 seasons, 14 episodes	English	Season 6 ongoing
Judy Justice (season 4)	Arbitration-based reality court show	Amazon Freevee	January 19, 2026	1 season, 120 episodes	English	Pending
Jury Duty (season 2)	Mockumentary	Amazon Freevee	March 20, 2026	1 season, 8 episodes	English	Renewed
Helluva Boss (season 3)	Musical black comedy adult animation	YouTube	October 14, 2026	1 season, 7 episodes	English	New episodes due to premiere in 2027; Renewed

== Regional original programming ==
=== Drama ===
Title	Genre	Premiere	Seasons	Prime Video exclusive region	Language	Status
Punto Nemo	Action	March 28, 2025	2 seasons, 10 episodes	Spain	Spanish	Pending
Snake Killer	Crime thriller	January 15, 2026	1 season, 4 episodes	Nordics	Danish	Pending
Vaka	Dystopian thriller	January 30, 2026	1 season, 6 episodes	Nordics	Swedish	Pending
Kill Jackie	Action thriller	October 2, 2026	1 season, 8 episodes	Selected territories	English	Pending

=== Comedy ===
Title	Genre	Premiere	Seasons	Prime Video exclusive region	Language	Status
Pesci piccoli – Un'agenzia, molte idee, poco budget	Workplace comedy	June 8, 2023	2 seasons, 14 episodes	Italy	Italian	Pending

=== Unscripted ===
==== Reality ====
Title	Genre	Premiere	Seasons	Prime Video exclusive region	Language	Status
Girls of Oslo	Docu-soap	November 3, 2023	3 seasons, 18 episodes	Norway	Norwegian	Pending
The 50	Survival competition	March 11, 2024	3 seasons, 45 episodes	Austria and Germany	German	Pending
The Traitors India	Survival competition	June 12, 2025	2 seasons, 20 episodes	India	Hindi	Pending
The Traitors Italia	Reality competition	October 30, 2025	1 season, 6 episodes	Italy	Italian	Renewed
Karaoké Club	Reality competition	November 21, 2025	1 season, 6 episodes	Canada	French	Pending
The Traitors Telugu	Reality competition	October 15, 2026	1 season, 10 episodes	India	Telugu	Pending

==== Variety ====
Title	Genre	Premiere	Seasons	Prime Video exclusive region	Language	Status
R.I.P. – Roast in Peace	Roast comedy	October 9, 2025	2 seasons, 12 episodes	Italy	Italian	Pending

=== Co-productions ===
Title	Genre	Partner/Country	Premiere	Seasons	Prime Video exclusive region	Language	Status
La que se avecina (seasons 12–16)	Sitcom	Telecinco/Spain	May 29, 2020	5 seasons, 48 episodes	Spain	Spanish	Renewed
The Assassin	Thriller	Stan/Australia; ZDF/Germany	July 25, 2025	2 seasons, 12 episodes	Ireland and United Kingdom	English	Pending
The Night Manager (season 2) (Note: Season 1 was a co-production between the BBC and AMC.)	Spy thriller	BBC One/United Kingdom	January 11, 2026	1 season, 6 episodes	All other markets	English	Renewed
Sidemen Present: SideMenu	Cooking reality competition	YouTube/United Kingdom	June 19, 2026	1 season, 4 episodes	United Kingdom	English	Pending

=== Continuations ===
These shows have been picked up by Amazon for additional seasons after having aired previous seasons on another network.

Title	Genre	Prev. network(s)	Premiere	Seasons	Prime Video exclusive region	Language	Status
Operación Triunfo (season 12)	Reality competition	La 1 (seasons 1–3; 9–11); Telecinco (seasons 4–8)	November 20, 2023	2 seasons, 28 episodes	Spain	Spanish	Renewed

== Upcoming original programming ==
=== Drama ===
Title	Genre	Premiere	Seasons
Vought Rising	Superhero drama	2027	TBA
Bella from Barneys	Drama	TBA	TBA
Bishop	Crime thriller	TBA	TBA
Boys of Tommen	Teen drama	TBA	1 season, 8 episodes
Calamities	Crime thriller	TBA	TBA
The Challenger	Biopic miniseries	TBA	TBA
Crouch End	Supernatural thriller miniseries	TBA	6 episodes
Delphi	Sports drama	TBA	TBA
Dirty	Crime drama	TBA	TBA
El Gato	Superhero	TBA	TBA
Eventing	Romance	TBA	TBA
Fourth Wing	Fantasy romance	TBA	TBA
God of War	Action-adventure	TBA	2 seasons
Joseph of Egypt	Religious drama miniseries	TBA	8 episodes
Just Cause	Thriller miniseries	TBA	TBA
Life Is Strange	Science fiction mystery teen drama	TBA	1 season, 6 episodes
The Probability of Miracles	Young adult drama	TBA	1 season, 8 episodes
Rally	Sports drama	TBA	TBA
Rise of the Empress	Fantasy	TBA	1 season, 8 episodes
RoboCop	Science fiction action	TBA	1 season, 8 episodes
Rose Hill	Western romance drama	TBA	TBA
Sex Criminals	Supernatural crime drama	TBA	1 season, 8 episodes
Silent River	Thriller drama	TBA	TBA
Stillwater	Horror thriller	TBA	1 season, 8 episodes
Things We Never Got Over	Romance drama	TBA	TBA
Tomb Raider	Action-adventure	TBA	TBA
Untitled 2022 University of Idaho killings scripted series	Crime drama	TBA	TBA
Untitled Karen Read series	True crime drama	TBA	TBA
Untitled FTX series	Drama miniseries	TBA	8 episodes

=== Comedy ===
Title	Genre	Premiere	Seasons
Postcards From Italy	Comedy	2027	TBA
Danger Money	Action comedy	TBA	1 season, 6 episodes
DINKS	Sitcom	TBA	TBA
Escorted	Romantic comedy	TBA	1 season, 8 episodes
Everyone in My Family Has Killed Someone	Dark comedy murder mystery	TBA	TBA
Untitled Totally Spies! live-action adaptation	Young adult action	TBA	TBA

=== Animation ===
==== Adult animation ====
Title	Genre	Premiere	Seasons
Lore Olympus	Fantasy romance	TBA	TBA
Odd Jobs	Science fiction comedy	TBA	TBA
Wytches	Supernatural horror	TBA	TBA

==== Kids & family ====
Title	Genre	Premiere	Seasons
Cupcake & Friends	Fantasy comedy	TBA	TBA
Love, Diana Music Hunters	Science fiction musical adventure	TBA	TBA

=== Non-English language scripted ===
==== French ====
Title	Genre	Premiere	Seasons
Glamsquad	Comedy drama	TBA	TBA

==== Filipino ====
Title	Genre	Premiere	Seasons
Kopino	Romantic drama	November 2026	TBA
Behind Closed Doors	Political thriller	2026	TBA

==== German ====
Title	Genre	Premiere	Seasons
Game of Keys	Comedy	TBA	TBA
Superior	Drama	1 season, 6 episodes	TBA

==== Hindi ====
Title	Genre	Premiere	Seasons
The Great Indian Code	Historical drama	TBA	TBA
Gulkanda Tales	Comedy drama	TBA	TBA
Job Trafficking	Drama	TBA	TBA
The Revolutionaries	Historical drama	TBA	TBA

==== Japanese ====
Title	Genre	Premiere	Seasons
Bless	Teen drama	Early 2027	TBA
Please Save My Earth	Supernatural science fiction	Late 2027	TBA
The Apothecary Diaries	Historical drama	2028	TBA

==== Spanish ====
Title	Genre	Premiere	Seasons
Catedrales	Crime drama	2026	TBA
La Señora	Legal crime thriller	TBA	TBA

==== Other ====
Title	Genre	Premiere	Seasons	Language
Murder in the Dark	Crime drama	2026	1 season, 6 episodes	Danish
Sarek	Psychological thriller	2027	TBA	Swedish
Gangs Kuruthi Punal	Period action drama	TBA	TBA	Tamil

=== Unscripted ===
==== Docuseries ====
Title	Subject	Premiere	Seasons	Language
Hometown Giants	Sports	Late 2026	TBA	English
Pelayo. Más allá del límite	Investigative journalism/True crime miniseries	2026	3 episodes	Spanish
Untitled 2026 FIFA World Cup docuseries	Sports	2026	TBA	Spanish
All or Nothing: Manchester United	Sports	Mid-2027	TBA	English
Lando	Sports	2027	3 episodes	English
Lineker	Sports	2027	4 episodes	English
Free Spirits: The Backpacker Poisonings	True crime	TBA	3 episodes	English
Madness of Three	True crime	TBA	5 episodes	English
Operation Deception	True crime	TBA	2 episodes	French
The Pig Farmer: Robert Pickton	True crime	TBA	3 episodes	English

==== Reality ====
Title	Subject	Premiere	Seasons	Language
Please Be My First Love	Dating show	July 2027	TBA	Japanese
Reality Retreat	Docu-reality	2027	TBA	English
The Crouches	Docu-reality	TBA	TBA	English
Heels in the Hay	Docu-reality	TBA	TBA	French
LOL: Last One Laughing U.S.	Stand-up comedy competition	TBA	1 season, 6 episodes	English
Surrender	Reality competition	TBA	TBA	English

==== Variety ====
Title	Genre	Premiere	Seasons	Language
4th & 1 Presents: Quarterback Club	Sports talk show	TBA	TBA	English

=== Co-productions ===
Title	Genre	Partner	Premiere	Prime Video exclusive region	Seasons	Language
Trauma	Medical thriller	Paramount+/United States	TBA	United Kingdom and Ireland	TBA	English

=== In development ===
Title	Genre
Bloodlust	Dark comedy
Blue Mountain State (season 4)	Sitcom
The Boyfriend	Psychological thriller
The Boys from Biloxi	Crime drama
The Boys: Mexicoref name="VoughtRising2027" />	Superhero drama
Breakthrough	Reality competition
Capital	Crime drama
Conan the Barbarian	Adult animation
Consider Phlebas	Science fiction
The Courier	Thriller
Crouching Tiger, Hidden Dragon	Wuxia
Cry Havoc	Historical military thriller
Daniel X: Genesis	Young adult science fiction drama
The Davenports	Historical drama
Dear Debbie	Thriller
Dorothy	Fantasy
Girls and Their Horses	Mystery thriller
God's Country	Dark comedy
Gods in Alabama	Legal drama
Home Team	Comedy
Hot White Heist	Heist comedy
House of Crowns	Teen drama
Jem and the Holograms	Musical drama
Jinx	Crime action
Kill the Bedfords	Apocalyptic dark comedy
Mass Effect	Military science fiction
Monstress	Adult animated fantasy
Murder Inc.	Crime action
Murdle	Murder mystery
Never to Be Found	Psychological thriller
Nut Jobs	Crime drama
One	Sports drama
Off Fairfax	Comedy
Oracle	Supernatural crime drama
Pearl	Crime action
Poltergeist	Horror
Powerless	Romantic fantasy
The Promised Neverland	Dark fantasy mystery thriller
The Prophecy	Supernatural thriller
Rich AF	Drama
San Fuerte	Comedy
The Second Lady	Political thriller
Seven Days in June	Romantic comedy
Shadow Work	Drama
She-Ra	Fantasy
Sigma Force	Techno-thriller
Skinny Dip	Romantic comedy
Steven Universe: Lars of the Stars	Animated science fantasy
Taylor Lautner: Werewolf Hunter	Supernatural action comedy
Temporal	Drama
Unsettling	Comedy
Untitled A Day of Fire: A Novel of Pompeii series	Historical drama miniseries
Untitled Atsuko Okatsuka series	Comedy
Untitled Cotton Malone series	Action thriller
Untitled Desus Nice travel docuseries	Travel docuseries
Untitled Marshawn Lynch series	Crime comedy
Untitled Nurse Jackie sequel series	Medical comedy drama
Untitled Pacific Rim prequel series	Science fiction monster
Untitled Stargate series	Military science fiction
Warhammer 40,000 animated series	Animated science fantasy
Warhammer 40,000 live-action series	Science fantasy
We Were Once Men	Dark comedy
Whiskey Matriarch	Drama
Wings of Fire	Animated fantasy
Wolfenstein	Alternative history
