= Alterio =

Alterio is an Italian surname. Notable people with the surname include:

- Ernesto Alterio (born 1970), Argentine actor
- Héctor Alterio (1929–2025), Argentine actor
- Malena Alterio (born 1974), Argentine actress
