= 32nd Forqué Awards =

2025 Spanish film and television awards

- Date: 19 December 2026
- Site: IFEMA Palacio Municipal, Madrid, Spain
- Organized by: EGEDA

The 32nd Forqué Awards ceremony, presented by EGEDA, will take place at the IFEMA Palacio Municipal in Madrid on 19 December 2026.

== Background ==
Organised by EGEDA the ceremony had the participation of Ayuntamiento de Madrid, the Madrid regional administration, and RTVE. The nominations were published on 12 November 2026. Producer César Benítez was later announced as the recipient of the EGEDA Gold Medal.

== Nominations ==
The nominees are listed as follows:

Best Fiction Film: The Beloved; La bola negra; Three Goodbyes; I Won't Die for Love	Best Fiction Series: Celeste; The Castle; Ravalear; Many People Need to Die
Best Male Performance in a Film: Alberto San Juan — The Light; Guitarricadelafuente — La bola negra; Eduard Fernández — The Bad Father; Javier Bardem — The Beloved	Best Female Performance in a Film: Carmen Maura — Calle Málaga; Lola Dueñas — La bola negra; Penélope Cruz — La bola negra; Victoria Luengo — The Beloved
Best Male Performance in a Series: Eduard Fernández — Killing a Bear; Enric Auquer — Ravalear; Manolo Solo — Celeste; Raúl Arévalo — The Castle	Best Female Performance in a Series: Anna Castillo — Many People Need to Die; Macarena García — Many People Need to Die; Carmen Machi — Celeste; Valentina Vidal — The Castle
Best Documentary Film: 200 vidas, Paco Rabal; Carlos Saura. Ese niño de la fotografía; Forqué, el oficio de hacer cine; Good Valley Stories	Best Latin-American Film: The Red Hangar; The Virgin of the Quarry Lake; Flies; Narciso
Best Short Film: Cara de cona; In memoriam; Ser un hombre	Best Animation Film: Evolution; The Violinist; Tad and the Magic Lamp; Winnipeg, the Seed of Hope
Cinema and Education in Values: Iván & Hadoum; La bola negra; Another League; I Won't Die for Love
