= Winnipeg, the Seed of Hope =

2026 film by Beñat Beitia and Elio Quiroga

- Theatrical release poster
- Spanish: Winnipeg, el barco de la esperanza
- Directed by: Beñat Beitia; Elio Quiroga
- Screenplay by: Laura Martel; Elio Quiroga; Beñat Beitia
- Based on: Winnipeg, el barco de la esperanza by Laura Martel
- Produced by: Ricardo Ramón; Toni Marin Vila; Marianne Mayer-Beckh; Nicolás Couvin
- Music by: Diego Navarro
- Production companies: Dibulitoon Studio; El Otro Film; La Ballesta; Malabar
- Distributed by: Barton Films
- Release dates: June 2026 (Shanghai); 10 July 2026 (Spain)
- Running time: 77–78 minutes
- Countries: Argentina; Chile; Spain
- Language: Spanish

Winnipeg, the Seed of Hope (Spanish: Winnipeg, el barco de la esperanza) is a 2026 animated film directed by Beñat Beitia and Elio Quiroga. It is an adaptation of a graphic novel by Laura Martel.

== Plot ==
In 1939, after the fall of Barcelona, refugees are interned in camps in France. Some 2,200 of them flee by boarding the Winnipeg, a French cargo ship chartered by Pablo Neruda which takes them to Valparaíso, Chile.

== Production ==
The film, based on a graphic novel by Laura Martel entitled Winnipeg, Neruda's Ship, is produced by La Ballesta, Dibulitoon Studio, El Otro Film and Malabar Producciones. It lasts 77 or 78 minutes.

== Release ==
The film was programmed at the 28th Shanghai International Film Festival and in the 'Contrechamp' slate of the 2026 Annecy International Animation Film Festival. It was released on 10 July 2026 under the distribution of Barton Films.

== Accolades ==
Year	Award	Category	Nominee(s)	Result	Ref.
2026	32nd Forqué Awards	Best Animation Film		Pending	

== See also ==
- List of Spanish films of 2026
