= Hope's Corner =

Spanish television series

- Spanish: Barrio Esperanza
- Created by: Iván Escobar; Antonio Sánchez Olivas
- Directed by: Sandra Gallego; Iñaki Peñafiel
- Starring: Mariona Terés
- Country of origin: Spain
- Original language: Spanish

Production
- Executive producers: Iván Escobar; Antonio Sánchez Olivas; Javier Méndez; María José Rodríguez
- Production companies: RTVE; Globomedia

Original release
- Network: La 1
- Release: 19 April 2026

Hope's Corner (Spanish: Barrio Esperanza) is a Spanish comedy-drama television series created by Iván Escobar and Antonio Sánchez Olivas starring Mariona Terés. It debuted on La 1 on 19 April 2026.

== Plot ==
Esperanza messes up with her life and ends up in jail. While in prison, she studies a degree on education and passes a public examination to become a teacher, joining the CEIP Barrio Esperanza.

== Cast ==
- Mariona Terés as Esperanza Artigas
- Alejo Sauras as Jerónimo Caballero
- Mariano Peña as Don Antonio
- Ana Jara as Claudia
- Laura de la Uz as Fátima
- Guillermo Campra as Manu
- Javier Pereira as Lucho
- Carmen Balagué as Juana
- Chloe con H as Nayeli
- Tian Tosas as León
- Nia Tosas as Martina

== Production ==
The series was produced by RTVE in collaboration with Globomedia (The Mediapro Studio).

== Release ==
The first two episodes premiered on La 1 on Sunday 19 April 2026, drawing an average viewership of 1,611,000 (a 15.3% audience share). The successful debut entailed the best performing opening for a weekly series on the public broadcaster in six years. Absolute audience figures dwindled in the following weeks as RTVE re-scheduled the next episodes on Wednesday and later in the prime time slot after La revuelta.

== Reception ==
Natalia Marcos of El País assessed that despite its good intentions, the series is dragged down by the excessive runtime of its episodes and certain mawkishness, noting the challenge posed by attempting to return to the Spanish model of old featuring 70-minute episodes and a dramedy appealing to all audiences.

== See also ==
- 2026 in Spanish television
