= Fading Grandeur =

- Created by: Juan Cavestany; Álvaro Fernández Armero
- Written by: Juan Cavestany; Álvaro Fernández Armero
- Directed by: Juan Cavestany; Álvaro Fernández Armero
- Starring: Antonio de la Torre; Alexandra Jiménez
- Country of origin: Spain
- Original language: Spanish

Production
- Executive producers: Juan Cavestany; Álvaro Fernández Armero; Alicia Yubero
- Production company: Cuidado con el perro

Original release
- Network: Netflix
- Release: 23 October 2026

Fading Grandeur (Spanish: Grande de España, lit. 'Grandee of Spain') is a comedy television series created by Juan Cavestany and Álvaro Fernández Armero. It stars Antonio de la Torre and Alexandra Jiménez. The series premiered on 23 October 2026.

== Plot ==
Don Leandro, a dwindling Marquis, is seeking to be recognised as a Grandee of Spain. He puts his mansion in Madrid up for sale. Following the start of negotiations, prospective buyer Sofía Carrington, a purportedly wealthy businesswoman, turns out not to be who she claims to be.

== Cast ==
- Antonio de la Torre as Don Leandro
- Alexandra Jiménez as Sofía Carrington
- Enric Benavent
- Fernando Andina
- Teresa Rabal
- Mercedes Sampietro
- Celia de Molina

== Production ==
The six-part series is a Cuidado con el perro production. It was created, written, and directed by Juan Cavestany and Álvaro Fernández Armero, both of whom also executive produced alongside Alicia Yubero.

== Release ==
Netflix released the series on 23 October 2026.

== See also ==
- 2026 in Spanish television
