= The Castle (TV series) =

Spanish thriller drama television series

- Promotional release poster
- Spanish: El castillo
- Created by: Isabel Peña; Eduardo Villanueva
- Based on: El proxeneta by Mabel Lozano
- Directed by: Elena Martín Gimeno; Sandra Romero
- Starring: Raúl Arévalo; Valentina Vidal; Omar Ayuso
- Music by: Olivier Arson
- Country of origin: Spain
- Original languages: Spanish; Romanian

Production
- Executive producers: Nacho Lavilla; Eduardo Villanueva; Isabel Peña
- Cinematography: Alana Mejía González; Diego Cabezas
- Editors: Alberto del Campo; Estel Roman
- Production companies: Movistar Plus+; Caballo Films; Mafalda Entertainment

Original release
- Network: Movistar Plus+
- Release: 8 October 2026

The Castle (Spanish: El castillo) is a Spanish thriller drama television series created by Isabel Peña and Eduardo Villanueva. It stars Raúl Arévalo, Valentina Vidal, and Omar Ayuso. It debuted on Movistar Plus on 8 October 2026.

== Plot ==
The plot follows the police couple formed by young inspector Gerardo Liesa and his partner Carmen Osés, as they investigate the brothels in Spain, crossing paths with 18-year-old Colombian Claudia.

== Cast ==
- Raúl Arévalo as Suizo
- Valentina Vidal as Claudia
- Omar Ayuso as Gerardo Liesa
- Laia Marull as Carmen Osés

== Production ==
The television adaptation of Mabel Lozano's non-fiction work El proxeneta was announced in June 2023, pitching Pilar Palomero as the intended director. Produced by Movistar Plus+ alongside Caballo Films and Mafalda Entertainment, the series was created by Isabel Peña and Eduardo Villanueva with Elena Martín Gimeno and Sandra Romero taking over direction duties. Filming began on November 2025.

== Release ==
The series was presented in an out-of-competition slot of the official selection of the 74th San Sebastián International Film Festival on 25 September 2026. It is scheduled to be released on Movistar Plus+ on 8 October 2026.

== Reception ==
Raquel Hernández Luján of HobbyConsolas gave the series a 90-point score, declaring it "one of the best series of the year", describing it as "a reality check grounded in a script that is precise without being sensationalist, in the natural dialogue and staging, and in a brilliant cast".

Ricardo Rosado of Fotogramas rated the series 4 out of 5 stars, writing that it works "because it shows what it is, what we are, and what we have allowed".

== Accolades ==
Year	Award	Category	Nominee(s)	Result	Ref.
2026	32nd Forqué Awards	Best Series		Pending	
2026	32nd Forqué Awards	Best Actor in a Series	Raúl Arévalo	Pending	
2026	32nd Forqué Awards	Best Actress in a Series	Valentina Vidal	Pending	

== See also ==
- 2026 in Spanish television
