= The Girls at the Back =

Spanish television series

- Promotional release poster
- Spanish: Las de la última fila
- Created by: Daniel Sánchez Arévalo
- Written by: Daniel Sánchez Arévalo
- Directed by: Daniel Sánchez Arévalo
- Starring: Itsaso Arana; Mariona Terés; Mónica Miranda; María Rodríguez; Godeliv Van den Brandt; Javier Rey
- Country of origin: Spain
- Original language: Spanish
- No. of seasons: 1
- No. of episodes: 6

Production
- Producer: José Antonio Félez
- Production company: Atípica Films

Original release
- Network: Netflix
- Release: 23 September 2022

The Girls at the Back (Spanish: Las de la última fila) is a Spanish comedy-drama television miniseries created by Daniel Sánchez Arévalo. It stars Itsaso Arana, Mariona Terés, Mónica Miranda, María Rodríguez, and Godeliv Van den Brandt.

== Plot ==
The plot tracks five childhood friends (Alma, Olga, Leo, Carol, and Sara), now past their thirties, fulfilling a yearly tradition: making a trip together. But this time the trip is special, as one of the members of the group has been diagnosed with cancer.

== Cast ==
- Itsaso Arana as Sara
- Mariona Terés as Leo
- Mónica Miranda as Alma
- Maria Rodríguez Soto as Carol
- Godeliv Van den Brandt as Olga
- Javier Rey as David
- Carmen Machi
- Michelle Jenner
- Macarena García
- Antonio de la Torre
- Rigoberta Bandini
- Melina Matthews

== Production ==
The series was produced by José Antonio Félez (Atípica Films) for Netflix. Shooting locations included the coastline of the province of Cádiz (from Tarifa to Conil) and the Madrid region.

== Release ==
Netflix released the series on 23 September 2022.

== Accolades ==
Year	Award	Category	Nominee(s)	Result	Ref.
2023	10th Feroz Awards	Best Comedy Series		Nominated	
2023	31st Actors and Actresses Union Awards	Best Television Actress in a Leading Role	Mariona Terés	Nominated	
2023	34th GLAAD Media Awards	Outstanding Spanish-Language Scripted Television Series		Nominated	
2024	25th Iris Awards	Best Fiction Screenplay	Daniel Sánchez Arévalo	Nominated	
2024	25th Iris Awards	Best Fiction Cinematography	Juana Jiménez	Nominated	
