= Naughty Business =

2026 Spanish television series

- Promotional release poster
- Spanish: Cochinas
- Created by: Carlos del Hoyo; Irene Bohoyo
- Written by: Carlos del Hoyo; Irene Bohoyo
- Directed by: Andrea Jaurrieta; Laura M. Campos; Núria Gago
- Starring: Malena Alterio; Celia Morán; Álvaro Mel
- Music by: Antonio Escobar
- Countries of origin: Spain; United States
- Original language: Spanish

Production
- Executive producers: Eneko Gutiérrez Sola; Aritz Cirbián
- Cinematography: Robert C. Carrera; Víctor Benavides
- Production companies: Amazon MGM Studios; Oslodije Media

Original release
- Network: Amazon Prime Video
- Release: 24 April 2026 – present

Naughty Business (Spanish: Cochinas) is a comedy television series created by Carlos del Hoyo and Irene Bohoyo and directed by Andrea Jaurrieta, Laura M. Campos, and Núria Gago. It stars Malena Alterio along with Celia Morán and Álvaro Mel. The series premiered on Amazon Prime Video on 24 April 2026.

== Plot ==
In 1998 Valladolid, Nines, a housewife from a conservative household, takes over the family business (the video rental shop 'Dorothy') after her husband falls into a coma. With help from hard-boiled store clerk Chon and asexual cinephile Agus, she veers the failing business model towards pornography.

== Cast ==
- Malena Alterio as Nines
- Celia Morán as Chon
- Álvaro Mel as Agustín
- Raquel Pérez
- Celia de Molina as Encarni
- Chani Martín as Mariano
- Esperanza de la Encarnación
- Álvaro Almodóvar
- Albert Baró
- Ana Mencía as Irene
- Josele Román
- David Castillo
- Aina Picarolo
- Paqui Horcajo
- José Luis García Pérez
- Blanca Javaloy
- Daniela Blume

== Production ==
The series was created and written by Carlos del Hoyo and Irene Bohoyo. Elena Anaya was originally announced for the leading role, but she eventually dropped out of the project and Malena Alterio stepped in.

== Release ==
The series premiered at the 29th Málaga Film Festival on 13 March 2026. Amazon Prime Video is set to release the series on 24 April 2026.

== Reception ==
Radhika Menon of Decider.com gave a positive recommendation, deeming Naughty Business to be "both entertaining and titillating".

Laura Pérez of Fotogramas rated the 8 episodes 4 out of 5 stars, praising both the comedy as well as Alterio with her leading role, channelling a similar energy to her character's in Something Is About to Happen.

== See also ==
- 2026 in Spanish television
