= Campus Drivers =

French romantic drama television series

- Genre: Romance drama
- Created by: Thomas Boullé
- Showrunner: Thomas Boullé
- Starring: Carmen Kassovitz; Baptiste Masseline; Madior Fall; Esteban Vial; Félix Nebel; Enzo Lorente; Paolo Luka-Noé; Eloïse Rey; Louna Balavoine; Cassandra Cano
- Composers: Matthieu Hernandez; David Menke
- Country of origin: France
- Original language: French
- No. of seasons: 1
- No. of episodes: 6

Production
- Producers: Éric Laroche; Raphaël Rocher
- Editor: Olivier Galliano
- Running time: 28–46 minutes
- Production company: Empreinte Digitale

Original release
- Network: Amazon Prime Video
- Release: November 6, 2026 – present

Campus Drivers is a French romantic drama television series created by Thomas Boullé and based on the novel series of the same name by C. S. Quill. The series was released on Prime Video on November 6, 2026.

== Plot ==
Scholarship student Loïs Hogan arrives at Belrose University expecting to move in with her longtime boyfriend, Max , only for him to break up with her and kick her out on her first night. With nowhere to stay, she meets Lane O'Neal , the founder of the campus ride-sharing service, Campus Drivers.

Lane agrees to let Loïs stay with him temporarily while she looks for housing and tries to win Max back. Living together, the two develop feelings for each other as Loïs deals with the pressure of keeping her scholarship and learns more about Lane's past, before Max's sudden return complicates their relationship.

== Cast and characters ==
- Carmen Kassovitz as Lois
- Baptiste Masseline as Lane
- Madior Fall as Donovan
- Esteban Vial as Lewis
- Felix Nebel as Adam
- Enzo Lorente as Max
- Paolo Luka-Noé as Aaron
- Eloïse Rey as Carrie
- Louna Balavoine as Becca
- Cassandra Cano as Emma

== Production ==
In June 2025, it was announced that Prime Video would adapt to television the novel series Campus Drivers by C.S. Quill. The first season adapted the first book Fast Lane . The series was created by Thomas Boullé and produced by Empreinte Digitale.

Principal photography for the series began on October 15, 2025 in Provence-Alpes-Côte d'Azur, and concluded on January 26, 2026. Villa Eilenroc served as location for Belrose University and Marina Baie des Anges for Lane's apartment.

== Release ==
The series was released on Prime Video on November 6, 2026.
