= Mediterraneo: The Law of the Sea =

- Theatrical release poster
- Spanish: Mediterráneo
- Directed by: Marcel Barrena
- Written by: Marcel Barrena; Danielle Schleif
- Starring: Eduard Fernández; Dani Rovira; Anna Castillo; Sergi López; Àlex Monner; Melika Foroutan
- Cinematography: Kiko de la Rica
- Music by: Arnau Bataller
- Production companies: Lastor Media; Fasten Films; Arcadia Motion Pictures; Cados Producciones; Heretic
- Distributed by: DeAPlaneta
- Release date: 1 October 2021 (Spain)
- Running time: 112 minutes
- Countries: Spain; Greece
- Language: Spanish
- Box office: $487,719

Mediterraneo: The Law of the Sea (Spanish: Mediterráneo) is a 2021 drama film co-written and directed by Marcel Barrena, which stars Eduard Fernández, Dani Rovira, Anna Castillo, Sergi López, Àlex Monner and Melika Foroutan. It was theatrically released in Spain on 1 October 2021.

== Premise ==
Initially set in 2015, the plot consists of a dramatization of the genesis of the Open Arms rescue vessel by Òscar Camps. Moved by the image of a child drowned in the sea, two lifeguards travel to Lesbos, Greece. They proceed to set a rescue team to help people in need.

== Cast ==
- Eduard Fernández as Oscar
- Dani Rovira as Gerard
- Anna Castillo as Esther
- Sergi López as Nico
- Àlex Monner as Santi Palacios
- Melika Foroutan as Rasha
- Giota Festa
- Patricia López Arnaiz

== Production ==
Produced by Lastor Media, Fasten Films, Arcadia Motion Pictures, Cados Producciones and Heretic, with the participation of RTVE, Movistar+ and TVC, funding from the ICAA and the ICEC, and support from Creative Europe's MEDIA Programme. The film was directed by Marcel Barrena, whereas its screenplay was co-written by Barrena alongside Danielle Schleif. Kiko de la Rica was responsible for the cinematography. The score was composed by Arnau Bataller.

Shooting began on 4 September 2020. After shooting in Greece and Barcelona for 8 weeks, filming wrapped on 26 October 2020.

== Release ==
Distributed by DeAPlaneta, the film was theatrically released in Spain on 1 October 2021.

== Reception ==
=== Critical response ===
Toni Vall of Cinemanía gave it 3½ out of 5 stars, considering that "the story is skilful, engaging, the image is impeccable, very solid".

Blai Morell of Fotogramas rated it with 4 out of 5 stars, deeming it to be a "more than effective story that stirs consciences about a tragic reality", highlighting the trio of performances by Fernández Castillo and Rovira, while citing as negative points both some decisions vis-à-vis the mise-en-scène as well as the circumstance that the character performed by Monner ends up becoming somewhat blurred.

Quim Casas of El Periódico de Catalunya scored 2 out of 5 stars, considering that the film turn outs to be the "chronicle of an awareness-raising and ethical discovery" and also that Barrena minimizes some real tensions.

Deeming the film to be a "stirring factually-based drama", Wendy Ide of ScreenDaily considered that Eduard Fernández (as well as the film itself) is "most compelling in the sequences which depict the jagged terrors and the sheer grinding exhaustion of the maritime rescues". She also noted that the story was "a rather Eurocentric" chronicle of the crisis.

It was shortlisted to be the Spanish submission to the 94th Academy Awards alongside Parallel Mothers and The Good Boss, but the latter film was eventually selected.

=== Accolades ===
Year	Award	Category	Nominee(s)	Result	Ref.
2021	27th Forqué Awards	Best Fiction or Animation Picture		Nominated	
2021	27th Forqué Awards	Best Film Actor	Eduard Fernández	Nominated	
2021	27th Forqué Awards	Cinema and Education in Values		Nominated	
2022	9th Feroz Awards	Best Actor (film)	Eduard Fernández	Nominated	
2022	77th CEC Medals	Best Actor	Eduard Fernández	Nominated	
2022	36th Goya Awards	Best Film		Nominated	
2022	36th Goya Awards	Best Actor	Eduard Fernández	Nominated	
2022	36th Goya Awards	Best Original Song	"Te espera el mar" by María José Llergo	Won	
2022	36th Goya Awards	Best Original Score	Arnau Bataller	Nominated	
2022	36th Goya Awards	Best Cinematography	Kiko de la Rica	Won	
2022	36th Goya Awards	Best Special Effects		Nominated	
2022	36th Goya Awards	Best Production Supervision	Albert Espel, Kostas Sfakianakis	Won	
2022	9th Platino Awards	Best Cinematography	Kiko de la Rica	Won	

== See also ==
- List of Spanish films of 2021
