= Mariona Terés =

Spanish actress

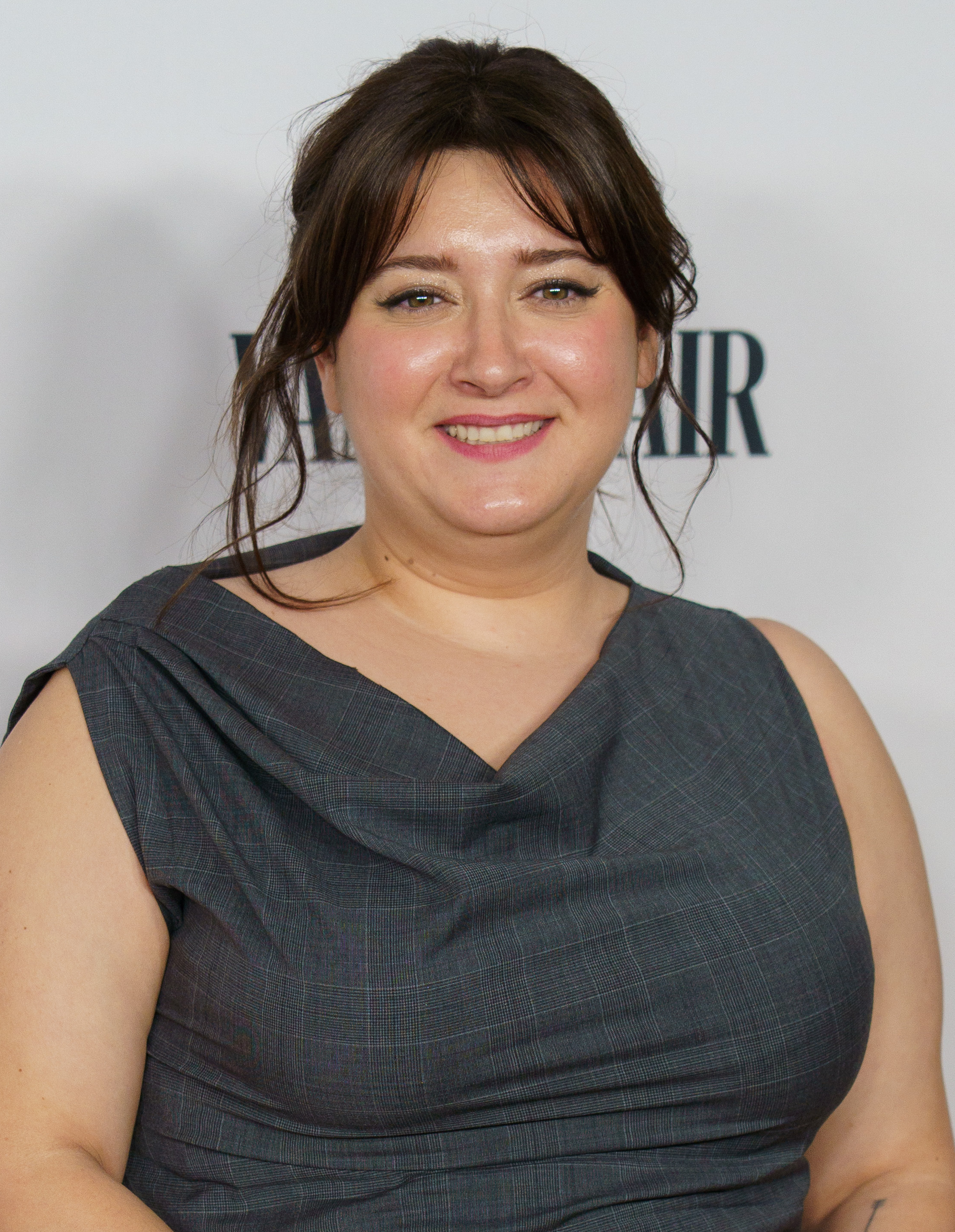
- Terés in 2025
- Born: Mariona Martínez Terés; 26 April 1985 (age 41); Barcelona, Catalonia, Spain
- Occupation: Actress

Mariona Martínez Terés (born 26 April 1985) is a Spanish actress.

== Life and career ==
Mariona Martínez Terés was born on 26 April 1985 in Barcelona. She made her acting debut in television in the soap opera Acacias 38, playing Enriqueta in 50 episodes.

She gained notoriety for playing a version of herself in the comedy series Paquita Salas. She has retroactively considered the role a gift as despite already having agent, nobody had given her a chance before and was told by casting directors that she "did not fit in with what they wanted physically". Other television works include appearances in Centro médico, Cuerpo de élite, Terror y feria, Cuéntame cómo pasó, Historias de Alcafrán, Veneno, One Way or Another, Wrong Side of the Tracks, La pasión turca, and Mariliendre. For her starring role as Leo in The Girls at the Back, she earned a nomination for Best Television Actress in a Leading Role at the 31st Actors and Actresses Union Awards.

Early film work include appearances in Cuerpo de élite, La sexta alumna, Holy Camp!, Hacerse mayor y otros problemas, Mylove Lost, anda Pijamas espaciales.

In 2026, she starred as Esperanza Artigas in the comedy-drama television series Hope's Corner.
