= In the City (film) =

- Spanish film poster
- Directed by: Cesc Gay
- Written by: Tomás Aragay; Cesc Gay
- Produced by: Andrés Vicente Gómez
- Starring: Mónica López; Eduard Fernández; María Pujalte; Alex Brendemühl; Vicenta Ndongo
- Cinematography: Andreu Rebés
- Music by: Joan Díaz; Jordi Prats
- Release date: 7 November 2003
- Running time: 110 minutes
- Country: Spain
- Language: Spanish

In the City (Spanish: En la ciudad) is a 2003 Spanish ensemble drama film directed by Cesc Gay. The film portrays the daily lives, secrets, lies, loneliness and frustrations of a group of eight thirty-something friends living in Barcelona.

== Cast ==
- Mónica López as Irene
- Eduard Fernández as Mario
- María Pujalte as Sofía
- Alex Brendemühl as Tomás
- Vicenta Ndongo as Sara
- Chisco Amado as Manu
- Miranda Makaroff as Ana
- Carme Pla as Eva
- Leonor Watling as Cristina
- Àurea Márquez as Silvia
- Jordi Sànchez as Andrés
- Eric Bonicatto as Eric

== Home media ==
In the City is available in Region 1 DVD in Spanish with English subtitles.

== Awards ==
- Goya Awards: Best Supporting Actor (Eduard Fernández)

== See also ==
- List of Spanish films of 2003
