= Fausto 5.0 =

2001 film by Àlex Ollé

- Directed by: Isidro Ortiz; Alex Ollé; Carlos Padrissa
- Screenplay by: Fernando León de Aranoa
- Based on: Faust by Goethe
- Produced by: Eduardo Campoy; Alicia Gallardo; Ramón Vidal
- Starring: Miguel Ángel Solá; Eduard Fernández; Najwa Nimri
- Cinematography: Pedro del Rey
- Edited by: Manel J. Frasquiel
- Music by: Josep Maria Sanou; Toni M. Mir
- Distributed by: Lauren Films
- Release date: 30 August 2001 (Venice)
- Running time: 93 mins
- Country: Spain
- Languages: Catalan; Spanish

Fausto 5.0 is a 2001 Spanish psychological thriller film directed by Àlex Ollé, Carlos Padrissa and Isidro Ortiz from a screenplay by Fernando León de Aranoa. It stars Miguel Ángel Solá, Eduard Fernández, and Najwa Nimri.

Fausto 5.0 is the last part of a trilogy dedicated to the figure of Faust. The first two installments were F@ust 3.0 (originally a play) and The Damnation of Faust (originally an opera). All three films were developed for the screen by La Fura dels Baus, an experimental theatre group from Barcelona.

== Plot ==
The plot takes place in Barcelona. A doctor – Fausto – on the verge of a nervous breakdown, meets a former patient – Santos Vella – who promises to grant his every wish. Reality starts dissolving and Fausto begins to lose control.

== Cast ==
- Miguel Ángel Solá as Doctor Fausto
- Eduard Fernández as Santos Vella
- Najwa Nimri as Julia
- Irene Montalà
- Juan Fernández
- Raquel González

== Awards ==
- Méliès d'Or Award, 2002 (among others) for the best European fantasy film
- International Fantasy Film Award (Best Film), Fantasporto 2002
- Grand Prize, Gérardmer Film Festival 2002

== See also ==
- List of Spanish films of 2001
