= Francisco Paesa =

Spanish spy (1936–2023)

- Born: 11 April 1936; Madrid, Spain
- Died: 3 May 2023 (aged 87); Bois-Colombes, Paris, France
- Other names: Francisco Pando, Alberto Seoane
- Occupations: Spy and businessman
- Known for: Implication in several corruption scandals and the faking of his own death
- Espionage activity
- Country: Spain, São Tomé and Príncipe (1990)

Francisco Paesa (11 April 1936 – 3 May 2023) was a Spanish spy and businessman best known for his implication in several corruption scandals and the faking of his own death in the 1990s.

== Biography ==
Paesa began his business career conducting various businesses with Francisco Macías Nguema, the then dictator of Equatorial Guinea.

In 1973 he was in a relation with Dewi Sukarno, the widow of the Indonesian president Sukarno.

In 1976 he was arrested by Interpol in Belgium and imprisoned in Switzerland, and it is believed that he collaborated with the Spanish paramilitary group GAL.

=== Sokoa Operation ===
In 1986, after serving his sentence, Paesa posed as an arms dealer who sold two antiaircraft missiles to Basque armed group ETA. The paramilitary group did not know that the missiles had a location signal provided by the CIA to Spanish authorities. The police followed the signal to Hendaye in France during July 1986 and found, for the first time, a major hideout in which a large number of weapons and documents were stored. Until then, the Spanish government knew virtually nothing about ETA logistics and this operation was an important turning point.

Judge Baltasar Garzón issued an arrest warrant for Francisco Paesa on 1 December 1988 for collaboration with armed mercenaries and the use of false identities.

In 1989, São Tomé and Príncipe named him permanent representative to the United Nations in Geneva. They removed his diplomatic immunity in 1990 after Spanish protests.

=== Roldán ===
Luis Roldán, known for being the Director General of the Spanish Civil Guard during a massive corruption scandal in 1993, had said that Paesa tricked him into stealing all the money that Roldán had previously stolen in that case but the judicial case on the research to hide the wealth of Luis Roldán was filed in 2004, as the crime had prescribed.

=== Alleged death and later years ===
In 1998 Paesa faked a fatal cardiac arrest in Thailand. Obituaries were published and a death certificate was forged. His family even commissioned thirty Gregorian Masses for his soul. The Spanish authorities believed that he had faked his death and he had escaped with two billion pesetas (given to him by Roldán).

A failed business in Bahrein granted him the enmity of London-based businessman Alexander Lebedev.

He reappeared on Spanish media in 2004. He was mentioned as an organizer of an operation to overthrow Equatorial Guinea dictator Obiang with an army of mercenaries. Some say that Francisco Paesa was spotted by a detective agency in Barcelona, others in France and some in Luxembourg. However, everyone agreed that he had an Argentine passport with the name Francisco Pando Sánchez.

In December 2005, the magazine Interviú surprised him in Paris, where he was interviewed by director Manuel Cerdán. He was 68 years old and his figure was impeccable. He explained that "his death" had been a misunderstanding, since it was reported that he was one of the three people who died in a shooting in Bangkok. He was willing to show the scars. As for the Russian mafia, he asked journalists to not publish the photos because that would force him to commit suicide.

In September 2016, the magazine Vanity Fair published an exclusive interview with Paesa. According to Paesa, his supposed death in Thailand was a misunderstanding; he was on an Anti-Terrorism commission from the Argentine Government when he was shot, wounded in action and taken to an unknown boat where he spent seven months in a coma.

Paesa is thought to have died in Paris on 3 May 2023.

== In fiction ==
The 2016 Spanish film Smoke & Mirrors is based on his life, with Eduard Fernández playing Paesa.
