= The Bad Father =

- Theatrical release poster
- Spanish: El mal padre
- Directed by: Roberto Bueso
- Screenplay by: Roberto Bueso; Óscar Díaz Cruz
- Produced by: Jaime Ortiz de Artiñano; Fernando Bovaira
- Starring: Eduard Fernández; Adam Jezierski; Francesco Carril; Meritxell Calvo; Cristina Plazas
- Cinematography: Álex Catalán
- Edited by: Andrés Gil
- Music by: Raquel Sánchez
- Production companies: MOD Producciones; MOD Pictures; Misent Producciones; Atresmedia Cine
- Distributed by: Caramel Films
- Release dates: 22 September 2026 (Zinemaldia); 20 November 2026 (Spain)
- Running time: 119 minutes
- Country: Spain
- Language: Spanish
- Budget: €2.7 million

The Bad Father (Spanish: El mal padre) is a 2026 Spanish comedy-drama film directed by Roberto Bueso, co-written with Óscar Díaz Cruz. It stars Eduard Fernández alongside Adam Jezierski, Francesco Carril, and Meritxell Calvo.

The film premiered at the 74th San Sebastián International Film Festival on 22 September 2026, ahead of its 20 November 2026 theatrical rollout in Spain by Caramel Films.

== Plot ==
Renowned writer and scholar Santiago Balmes reunites with his three children, long estranged from him after he left the family for a woman. He proposes them spending Christmas together in the old summer house, proving to be an opportunity to face past rifts.

== Cast ==
- Eduard Fernández as Santiago Balmes
- Adam Jezierski as Alberto
- Francesco Carril as Damián
- Meritxell Calvo as Clara
- Cristina Plazas as Cristina
- María Maroto as Irene
- Berta Bolufer
- Joan Solé
- Carles Sanjaime
- Jorge Picó
- Enric Juezas
- Sonia Almarcha

== Production ==
The film was produced by MOD Producciones, MOD Pictures, Misent Producciones and Atresmedia Cine, with the participation of Atresmedia, Netflix, and À Punt. It was entirely shot in the Valencia Region. It had a reported budget of €2.7 million.

== Release ==
Cast and crew members attending the presentation of the film at the San Sebastián International Film Festival

The Bad Father was presented at the 74th San Sebastián International Film Festival on 22 September 2026, in competition for the Golden Shell. It also served as the opening film of the 41st Mostra de València on 3 November 2026.

Distributed by Caramel Films, it is scheduled to be released theatrically in Spain on 20 November 2026.

== Reception ==
Alfonso Rivera of Cineuropa described the film as "a dramedy that raises the odd smile and never lapses into sentimentality thanks to its intelligent use of ellipses".

Matthew Joseph Jenner of International Cinephile Society rated the film 3 out of 5 stars, writing that, while "more conventional" than it could have been, "it is a moving comedy about life, death and the many peculiarities in between".

Ricardo Rosado of Fotogramas rated the film 4 out of 5 stars, extolling a colossal Fernández, equal parts "terrifying and magnetic" as the best thing about the film.

Raquel Hernández Lujan of HobbyConsolas gave the film a 75-point score, considering that "despite playing a despicable character", Eduard Fernández "carries the film on his shoulders" "with true acting acumen".

Andrea G. Bermejo of Cinemanía rated the film 4 out of 5 stars, declaring it "the film of the year about how difficult it is to love a bad father" in which Eduard Fernández once again proves himself to be one of the finest actors in Spanish cinema, in the role of the father.

== Accolades ==
Year	Award	Category	Nominee(s)	Result	Ref.
2026	9th Lola Gaos Awards	Best Film		Pending	
2026	9th Lola Gaos Awards	Best Director	Roberto Bueso	Pending	
2026	9th Lola Gaos Awards	Best Actor	Eduard Fernández	Pending	
2026	9th Lola Gaos Awards	Best Screenplay	Roberto Bueso, Óscar Díaz	Pending	
2026	9th Lola Gaos Awards	Best Production Supervision	Lorena Lluch	Pending	
2026	9th Lola Gaos Awards	Best Art Direction	Rafa Jannone	Pending	
2026	9th Lola Gaos Awards	Best Sound	Mar González	Pending	
2026	9th Lola Gaos Awards	Best Makeup and Hairstyles	Amparo Carrió, Ana Mª Balsera	Pending	
2026	32nd Forqué Awards	Best Actor in a Film	Eduard Fernández	Pending	

== See also ==
- List of Spanish films of 2026
