= Something Is About to Happen =

- Film poster
- Spanish: Que nadie duerma
- Directed by: Antonio Méndez Esparza
- Screenplay by: Antonio Méndez Esparza; Clara Roquet
- Based on: Que nadie duerma by Juan José Millás
- Produced by: Pedro Hernández Santos; Miguel Morales; Vlad Radulescu; José María Morales; Alvaro Portanet Hernández; Amadeo Hernández Bueno
- Starring: Malena Alterio; Aitana Sánchez Gijón; Rodrigo Poisón; José Luis Torrijo; Manuel de Blas; Mariona Ribas; Mariano Llorente; Íñigo de la Iglesia; Federico Pérez Rey
- Cinematography: Barbu Balasoiu
- Edited by: Marta Velasco
- Music by: Zeltia Montes
- Production companies: Aquí y Allí Films; Wanda Visión; Que nadie duerma AIE; Avanpost
- Distributed by: Wanda Visión
- Release dates: 22 October 2023 (Seminci); 17 November 2023 (Spain)
- Countries: Spain; Romania
- Language: Spanish

Something Is About to Happen (Spanish: Que nadie duerma) is a 2023 Spanish-Romanian drama thriller film directed by Antonio Méndez Esparza from a screenplay by Méndez Esparza and Clara Roquet based on Juan José Millás' novel. It stars Malena Alterio alongside Aitana Sánchez-Gijón.

== Plot ==
Set in Madrid, the plot follows Lucía, a software developer turned taxi driver who fantasizes about her life while listening to Puccini's Turandot. She ends up scheming a plan of revenge while driving in the streets of the Spanish capital.

== Cast ==
- Malena Alterio as Lucía
- Aitana Sánchez-Gijón as Roberta
- Rodrigo Poisón as Braulio Botas
- José Luis Torrijo as Santiago
- Manuel de Blas as padre de Lucía
- Mariona Ribas as Fátima

== Production ==
Based on Juan José Millás' novel Que nadie duerma, the screenplay was penned by Antonio Méndez Esparza alongside Clara Roquet. It was Méndez Esparza's first time working with a professional cast. Roquet described the lead character as a female version of the protagonists of Joker and Taxi Driver.

The film was produced by Aquí y Allí Films, Wanda Visión, and Que nadie duerma AIE alongside Avanpost, with participation of RTVE, Amazon, and Telemadrid and backing from ICAA, Ayuntamiento de Madrid, Comunidad de Madrid, and Castilla-La Mancha Impulsa. Shooting locations included Usera (Madrid) and Toledo.

== Release ==
The film world premiered at the 68th Valladolid International Film Festival (Seminci) on 22 October 2023. Distributed by Wanda Visión, it was released theatrically in Spain on 17 November 2023. It was made available on Prime Video streaming in Spain on 1 February 2024.

== Reception ==
On the review aggregator website Rotten Tomatoes, 100% of 6 critics' reviews are positive, with an average rating of 7.3/10.

Sergi Sánchez of La Razón rated the film 3½ out of 5 stars, writing that it "builds an unusual bridge between the Spanish costumbrista drama and the cinema of Charlie Kaufman".

Javier Ocaña of El País deemed the "stupendous" film to be part of a "free, lewd and mysterious universe" together with Staring at Strangers.

Jordi Battle Caminal of Fotogramas rated the film 3 out of 5 stars, highlighting Alterio ("carrying the film on her shoulders with admirable ease") as the best thing about the film.

Philipp Engel of Cinemanía rated the film 4 out of 5 stars, writing that it elegantly blends "neo-realism in pursuit of social justice and operatic delirium under a veneer of modernity".

=== Top ten lists ===
The film appeared on a number of critics' top ten lists of the best Spanish films of 2023:

- 9th — El Confidencial (consensus)

== Accolades ==
Year	Award	Category	Nominee(s)	Result	Ref.
2023	29th Forqué Awards	Best Actress in a Film	Malena Alterio	Won	
2024	11th Feroz Awards	Best Actress in a Film	Malena Alterio	Won	
2024	11th Feroz Awards	Best Supporting Actress in a Film	Aitana Sánchez-Gijón	Nominated	
2024	11th Feroz Awards	Best Original Soundtrack	Zeltia Montes	Nominated	
2024	79th CEC Medals	Best Actress	Malena Alterio	Won	
2024	38th Goya Awards	Best Actress	Malena Alterio	Won	
2024	32nd Actors and Actresses Union Awards	Best Film Actress in a Leading Role	Malena Alterio	Won	
2024	32nd Actors and Actresses Union Awards	Best Film Actress in a Secondary Role	Aitana Sánchez-Gijón	Nominated	
2024	11th Platino Awards	Best Actress	Malena Alterio	Nominated	

== See also ==
- List of Spanish films of 2023
