= I Always Sometimes =

2026 Spanish television series

- Genre: Drama
- Created by: Marta Bassols; Marta Loza
- Written by: Marta Bassols; Marta Loza; Almudena Monzú
- Directed by: Marta Loza; Claudia Costafreda; Ginesta Guindal
- Starring: Ana Boga; David Menéndez; Paco Tous; María de Medeiros; Diane Guerrero
- Country of origin: Spain
- Original language: Spanish

Production
- Production company: Suma Content

Original release
- Network: Movistar Plus+
- Release: April 2026

I Always Sometimes (Spanish: Yo siempre a veces) is a Spanish drama television series created by Marta Bassols and Marta Loza for Movistar Plus+. Released in April 2026, it follows a young single mother in Barcelona and won the prize for best screenplay at Canneseries in 2026.

== Premise ==
Laura, from Santa Coloma de Gramenet, becomes pregnant a week after meeting Rubén, who runs a bar in the Raval. The couple separate six months after their son Mario is born, leaving Laura to raise him largely alone while struggling with insecure work and housing in Barcelona.

== Cast ==
- Ana Boga as Laura
- David Menéndez as Rubén
- Paco Tous
- Belén Ponce de León
- Marta Bassols
- María de Medeiros
- Diane Guerrero

The series is Boga's acting debut.

== Production ==
The series was written by Bassols and Loza with Almudena Monzú, and directed by Loza, Claudia Costafreda and Ginesta Guindal. It was produced for Movistar Plus+ by Suma Content, the company founded by Javier Calvo and Javier Ambrossi. Bassols said the series drew substantially on her own experience of motherhood.

== Release and awards ==
I Always Sometimes was released on Movistar Plus+ in April 2026. It was one of eight titles in the official long-form competition at Canneseries in 2026, where Bassols, Loza and Monzú won the award for best screenplay.

== Reception ==
Writing for verTele, Pedro Zárate called it one of the most realistic and human series in Movistar Plus+'s catalogue, praising its treatment of economic precarity among young Spaniards and Ana Boga's debut performance, but criticised the accumulation of misfortunes as so far-fetched that it endangered the show's realistic tone.

Randy Meeks of Espinof similarly praised the series for rejecting a sanitised image of motherhood and for Boga's performance, while writing that it fell into a cycle of misfortune that could frustrate viewers and that some dialogue felt unearned.
