= Killing a Bear =

- Promotional release poster
- Spanish: Matar a un oso
- Created by: Jorge Sánchez-Cabezudo; Alberto Sánchez-Cabezudo
- Directed by: Jorge Sánchez-Cabezudo; Borja Soler
- Starring: Eduard Fernández; Maria Rodríguez Soto; Miki Esparbé; Nora Navas; Pol López; Àlex Monner
- Music by: Olivier Arson; Abel Hernández
- Countries of origin: Spain; France
- Original languages: Spanish; French; Catalan

Production
- Cinematography: Gorka Gómez Andreu
- Editors: Miguel Doblado; Carolina Martínez Urbina
- Production companies: Movistar Plus; ARTE France; Kubik Films

Original release
- Network: Movistar Plus+

Killing a Bear (Spanish: Matar a un oso) is a 2026 crime thriller miniseries created by Jorge Sánchez-Cabezudo and Alberto Sánchez-Cabezudo. It stars Eduard Fernández, Maria Rodríguez Soto, Miki Esparbé, Pol López, Nora Navas, and Àlex Monner.

== Plot ==
Set in the Aran Valley, the series is based on the death of the bear Cachou in 2020 and the subsequent investigation that uncovered an anti-Bear network.

== Cast ==
- Eduard Fernández as Farga
- Maria Rodríguez Soto
- Miki Esparbé
- Pol López
- Nora Navas
- Àlex Monner as Pascual

== Production ==
The Sánchez-Cabezudo brothers became acquainted with the real story through a report by Sandrine Moret published on Le Monde. The also found inspiration in series such as Sambre - Anatomy of a Crime and Northern Exposure. The series is a Movistar Plus original co-production with ARTE France alongside Kubik Films. It was shot in Pallars Sobirà.

== Release ==
Alberto and Jorge Sánchez-Cabezudo attending the 2026 Seminci.

The series was presented at the 71st Valladolid International Film Festival on 23 October 2026. It is set to debut on Movistar Plus on 10 December 2026.

== Accolades ==
Year	Award	Category	Nominee(s)	Result	Ref.
2026	32nd Forqué Awards	Best Actor in a Series	Eduard Fernández	Pending	

== See also ==
- 2026 in Spanish television
