= Malena Alterio =

Argentine-born Spanish actress

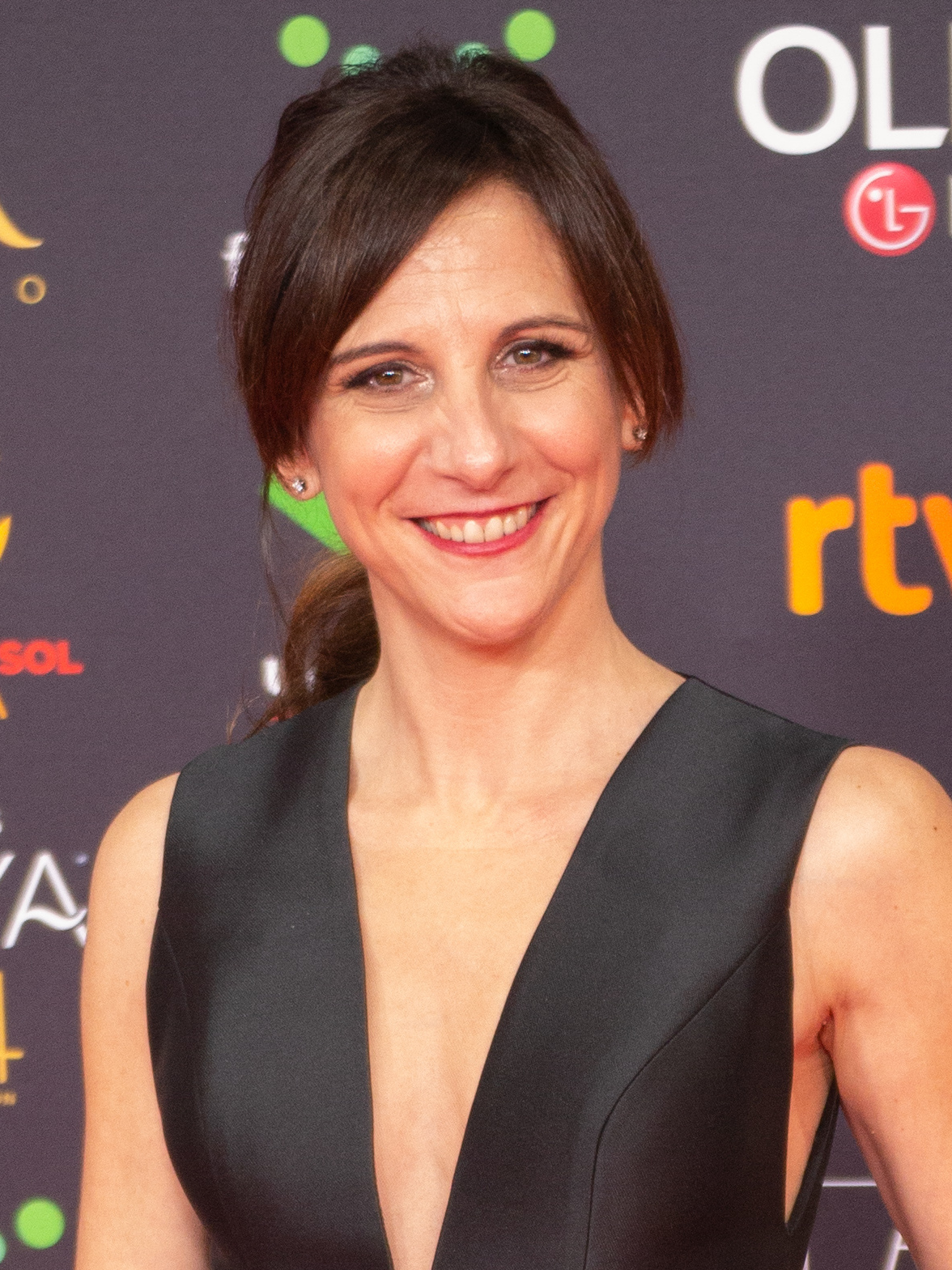
- At the 34th Goya Awards in 2020
- Born: Malena Grisel Alterio Bacaicoa; 21 January 1974 (age 52); Buenos Aires, Argentina
- Occupation: Actress
- Years active: 1995–present
- Spouse: Luis Bermejo (m. 2003–2016)
- Father: Héctor Alterio
- Relatives: Ernesto Alterio (brother)

Malena Grisel Alterio Bacaicoa (born 21 January 1974) is an Argentine-born Spanish actress. She became a television icon in Spain for her performance in sitcom Aquí no hay quien viva, playing the role of Belén López Vázquez. She is the recipient of numerous awards, such as the Goya Award for Best Actress for Something Is About to Happen (2023).

== Life and career ==
Malena Alterio was born on 21 January 1974 in Buenos Aires, Argentina to Héctor Alterio and Ángela Bacaicoa, who moved to Madrid, Spain when Malena was a toddler. Her older brother Ernesto is also an actor. She received training at Cristina Rota's acting school.

She made her feature film debut in The Hold-Up (2001), earning a nomination to the Goya Award for Best New Actress.

== Filmography ==
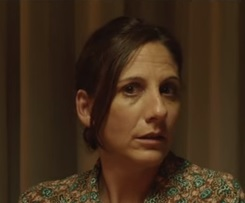
Alterio in the short film Beta (2015)

=== Film ===
Year	Title	Role	Notes	Ref.
2001	El palo (The Hold-Up)	Violeta, "Pecholata"		
2002	Cásate conmigo, Maribel			
2003	Torremolinos 73	Vanessa		
2003	Las voces de la noche (Voices in the Night)	Julia		
2007	Miguel y William	Magdalena		
2007	Días de cine (Cinema Days)	Gloria		
2007	Casual Day	Bea		
2007	La torre de Suso (Suso's Tower)	Marta		
2008	Una palabra tuya (One Word from You)	Rosario		
2009	Al final del camino (Road to Santiago)	Pilar		
2009	Nacidas para sufrir	Marta		
2011	Cinco metros cuadrados (Five Square Meters)	Virginia		
2015	Perdiendo el norte (Off Course)	Marisol		
2019	Bajo el mismo techo (Under the Same Roof)	Lucía		
2022	Espejo, espejo (Mirror, Mirror)	Cristina		
2023	Bajo terapia (Under Therapy)	Marta		
2023	Que nadie duerma (Something Is About to Happen)	Lucía		
2024	Mala persona (Mean Streak)	Sagrario		
2024	Odio el verano (I Hate Summer)	Marisa		

- Semen, una historia de amor, directed by Inés París and Daniela Fejerman (2005)

=== Television ===
- Cochinas (2026)
- En fin (2024) as Julia
- Señoras del (h)AMPA (2019) (13 episodes)..... Lourdes Sanguino
- Vergüenza (2017–20) ..... Nuria.
- BuenAgente (2011) (19 episodes)..... Lola
- La que se avecina (2007) (13 episodes)..... Cristina Aguilera
- Aquí no hay quien viva (2003–06) (90 episodes) ..... Belén López Vázquez
- El Comisario (2003) (5 episodes) ..... Agente Lorena
- Hermanas (1998) (1 episode) ..... Isabel

== Theatre ==
- Charitys (1996), collective direction
- Musicantes (1996), directed by Daniel Lovecchio
- Náufragos (1997), directed by María Boto and Jesús Amate
- Lorca al rojo vivo (1998), directed by Cristina Rota
- La barraca (1998), directed by Cristina Rota
- Encierro (1999), directed by Andrés Lima
- La pastelera (1999), directed by Malena Alterio
- El obedecedor (2000), directed by Amparo Valle
- Rulos (2001), directed by Fernando Soto
- Uncle Vanya (2008)

== Accolades ==
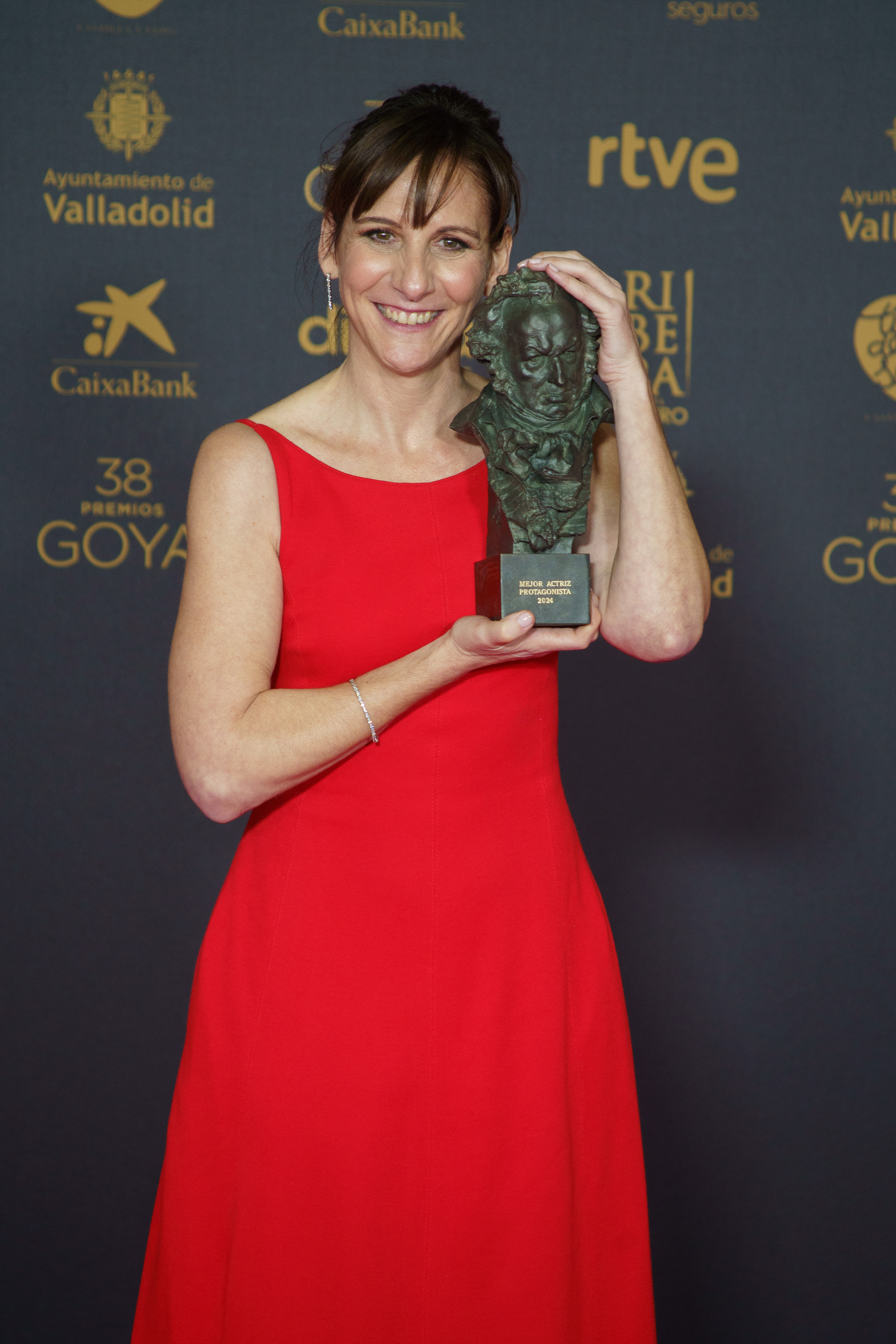
Alterio holding her Goya Award for Best Actress for Something Is About to Happen

Year	Award	Category	Work	Result	Ref.
2002	16th Goya Awards	Best New Actress	The Hold-Up	Nominated	
2004	13th Actors and Actresses Union Awards	Best Television Actress in a Secondary Role	Aquí no hay quien viva	Won	
2005	7th ATV Awards	Best TV Actress	Aquí no hay quien viva	Won	
2018	5th Feroz Awards	Best Main Actress in a Series	Vergüenza	Won	
2018	27th Actors and Actresses Union Awards	Best Television Actress in a Leading Role	Vergüenza	Won	
2019	6th Feroz Awards	Best Main Actress in a Series	Vergüenza	Nominated	
2023	29th Forqué Awards	Best Actress in a Film	Something Is About to Happen	Won	
2024	11th Feroz Awards	Best Main Actress in a Film	Something Is About to Happen	Won	
2024	79th CEC Medals	Best Actress	Something Is About to Happen	Won	
2024	38th Goya Awards	Best Actress	Something Is About to Happen	Won	
2024	32nd Actors and Actresses Union Awards	Best Film Actress in a Leading Role	Something Is About to Happen	Won	
2024	11th Platino Awards	Best Actress	Something Is About to Happen	Nominated	

=== Fotogramas de Plata ===
Year	Category	Movie/TV series	Result
2004	Best Television Actress	Aquí no hay quien viva	Nominee
