= Eduard Fernández =

Spanish actor (born 1964)

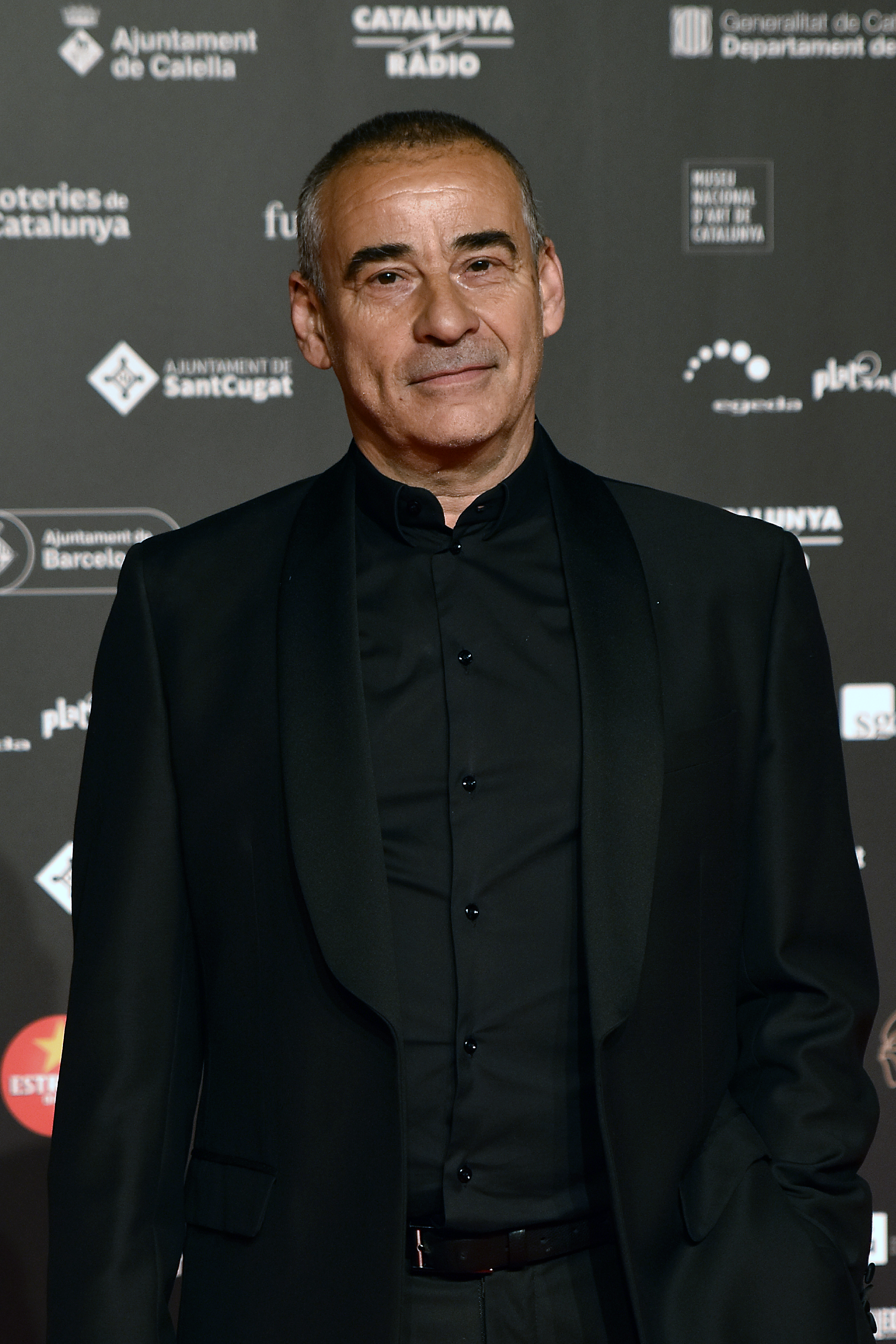
- Fernández in 2022
- Born: Eduardo Fernández Serrano; 25 August 1964 (age 62); Barcelona, Spain
- Other name: Eduard Fernandez
- Education: Institut del Teatre
- Occupations: Actor; mime artist
- Relatives: Greta Fernández (daughter)

Eduard Fernández Serrano (born 25 August 1964) is a Spanish screen and stage actor from Catalonia. He has featured in films such as Fausto 5.0 (2001), In the City (2003), Smoke & Mirrors (2016), While at War (2019), The 47 (2024), and Marco, the Invented Truth (2024). He is the recipient of numerous accolades, including four Goya Awards.

== Early life and education ==
Eduard Fernández was born in Barcelona on 25 August 1964. He trained as a mime artist at the Barcelona's Institut del Teatre, and did street performances as such.

== Screen career ==
Following a theatre (he was a member of Els Joglars) and television career, he made his feature film debut at age 30, in 1994 film Souvenir. His breakthrough film role in 1999 thriller Washington Wolves earned him a nomination to the Goya Award for Best New Actor.

His portrayal of Santos Vella, a contemporary Mephistopheles, in Fausto 5.0 (2001) earned him the Goya Award for Best Actor.

Fernández starred in Alberto Rodríguez's political thriller Smoke & Mirrors (2016) as corrupt spy/fixer Francisco Paesa, clinching the Silver Shell for Best Actor at the San Sebastián International Film Festival.

In 2019, he portrayed the founder of the Spanish Legion, one-eyed and one-armed Millán Astray, in While at War, a drama film set in the early stages of the Spanish Civil War focused on the plight of philosopher Miguel de Unamuno. For his performance in the film, he won a Goya Award for Best Supporting Actor. He also starred in Belén Funes' social drama A Thief's Daughter in tandem with his daughter Greta.

In 2021, Fernández featured in Mediterraneo: The Law of the Sea, in which he portrayed Open Arms founder Òscar Camps, the protagonist of the film.

Fernández featured in 2022 psychological thriller God's Crooked Lines (2022), portraying psychiatric hospital director Samuel Alvar, the nemesis of lead character Alice Gould. In an interview to Vanity Fair, Fernández stated that he believed his character to be "a bit misogynistic in addition to having a big ego".

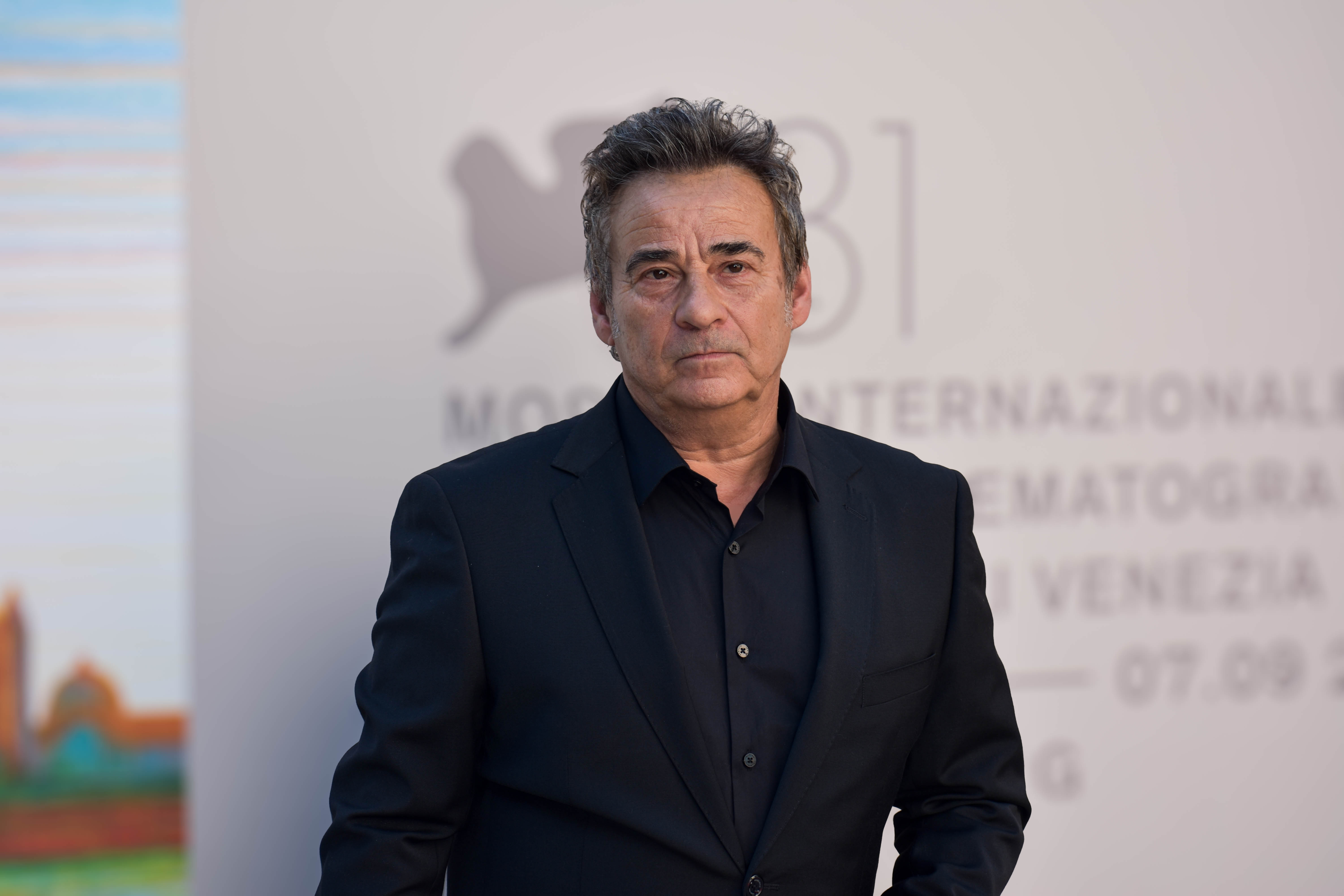
Fernández attending the 81st Venice International Film Festival in 2024 for the premiere of Marco, the Invented Truth.

In 2024, Fernández portrayed two iconic roles in film: Manolo Vital in The 47 and Enric Marco in Marco, the Invented Truth, the former a bus driver of immigrant background who hijacked a Barcelona bus line in 1978 in order to stand for his neighbors' rights and the latter an impostor who falsely pretended to be a survivor of the Flossenbürg concentration camp. For the aforementioned performances, he respectively won the Gaudí and the Goya Awards for Best Leading Actor. Also in 2024, he was awarded the Gold Medal of Merit in the Fine Arts. The year was rounded up with the short film El otro, Fernández's directorial debut, which premiered at the 69th Seminci. In 2025, he was awarded with Spain's National Cinematography Prize, recognizing his career as well as a year 2024 with "two outstanding performances in two completely different films".

In 2025, he portrayed PCE leader Santiago Carrillo in the historical drama miniseries The Anatomy of a Moment about the 23 February 1981 Spanish coup attempt. In order to prepare for the role, he worked with Carlos Latre. He went on to star in the family drama The Bad Father (2026), set to premiere at the 74th San Sebastián International Film Festival. In the film, he portrayed a renowned writer and scholar reuniting with his three estranged children for Christmas. To prepare for his role, he found inspiration from multiple left-leaning firebrands who end up in the political right; he mentioned Antonio Escohotado as a reference, with a connection to drug use, a great public speaker and somewhat "full of himself".

== Family ==
Fernández had a 25-year relationship with writer Esmeralda Berbel, with whom he had one daughter, Greta (born 1995), who has also pursued an acting career.

== Views ==
In 2026, Fernández co-signed alongside other Spanish artists a text urging the United Nations and the governments of the world to actively work towards the release from prison of Palestinian leader Marwan Barghouti.

== Partial filmography ==
=== Films ===
Key
†	Denotes films that have not yet been released

Year	Title	Role	Notes	Ref.
1994	Souvenir		Feature film debut	
1999	Zapping	Ramiro / Ramón		
1999	Los lobos de Washington (Washington Wolves)	Miguel		
2000	El portero (The Goalkeeper)	Nardo		
2001	La voz de su amo (His Master's Voice)	Charli		
2001	Son de mar (Sound of the Sea)	Alberto Sierra		
2001	Fausto 5.0	Santos Vella		
2002	El embrujo de Shanghai (The Shanghai Spell)	Forcat		
2002	Smoking Room	Ramírez		
2003	The Galíndez File	Jesús Galíndez		
2003	En la ciudad (In the City)	Mario		
2004	Cosas que hacen que la vida valga la pena (Things That Make Living Worthwhile)	Jorge		
2005	Hormigas en la boca (Ants in the Mouth)	Martín		
2005	Obaba	Lucas		
2005	El método (The Method)	Fernando		
2006	Alatriste	Sebastián Copons		
2006	Ficción (Fiction)	Álex		
2008	3 días (Before the Fall)	Lucio		
2008	Che	Ciro Algarañaz		
2008	El vestido	Fernando		
2008	La noche que dejó de llover			
2009	Amores locos (Mad Love)	Enrique		
2009	Tres dies amb la família (Three Days With the Family)	Josep Maria		
2009	Flores negras	Peter		
2009	Luna caliente	Juan		
2010	Biutiful	Tito		
2010	Pa negre (Black Bread)	Mestre ('teacher')		
2010	La mosquitera (The Mosquito Net)	Miquel		
2011	La piel que habito (The Skin I Live In)	Fulgencio		
2012	The Pelayos (Winning Streak)	La Bestia		
2012	Due uomini, quattro donne e una mucca depressa	Emilio		
2012	Miel de naranjas (Orange Honey)	Vicente		
2012	Una pistola en cada mano (A Gun in Each Hand)	E.		
2013	Todas las mujeres (All the Women)	Nacho		
2013	Gente en sitios (People in Places)			
2014	Marsella (Marseille)	Jesús		
2014	El Niño	Sergio		
2014	Murieron por encima de sus posibilidades (Dying Beyond Their Means)			
2014	Los ausentes			
2015	Lejos del mar (Far from the Sea)	Santi		
2015	Felices 140 (Happy 140)	Ramón		
2015	Truman	Luis		
2016	La noche que mi madre mató a mi padre (The Night My Mother Killed My Father)	Ángel		
2016	El hombre de las mil caras (Smoke & Mirrors)	Francisco Paesa		
2016	1898, los últimos de Filipinas (1898, Our Last Men in the Philippines)	Capitán Enrique de las Morenas		
2017	Perfectos desconocidos (Perfect Strangers)	Alfonso		
2018	Todos lo saben (Everybody Knows)	Fernando		
2019	Mientras dure la guerra (While at War)	Millán-Astray		
2019	La hija de un ladrón (A Thief's Daughter)	Manuel		
2021	Mediterráneo (Mediterraneo: The Law of the Sea)	Oscar		
2022	Los renglones torcidos de Dios (God's Crooked Lines)	Samuel Alvar		
2024	Marco, la verdad inventada (Marco, the Invented Truth)	Enric Marco		
2024	El 47 (The 47)	Manolo Vital		
2026	El mal padre (The Bad Father)	Santiago Balmes		
2026	En nombre de otro † (Proxies)			
TBD	Lo vent †	Mateo		

=== Television ===
Year	Title	Role	Notes	Ref.
2010	La princesa de Éboli	Felipe II	TV movie aired as 2-part miniseries	
2011	14 d'abril. Macià contra Companys	Francesc Cambó	TV movie	
2014	Descalzo sobre la tierra roja	Pedro Casaldáliga	Miniseries	
2017	La zona	Héctor Uría		
2020–23	30 monedas (30 Coins)	Padre Vergara		
2024	Mano de hierro (Iron Reign)	Joaquín Manchado		
2025	Anatomía de un instante (The Anatomy of a Moment)	Santiago Carrillo		
2026	La casa de los espíritus (The House of the Spirits)	Severo del Valle		
2026	Matar a un oso (Killing a Bear)	Farga		

== Accolades ==
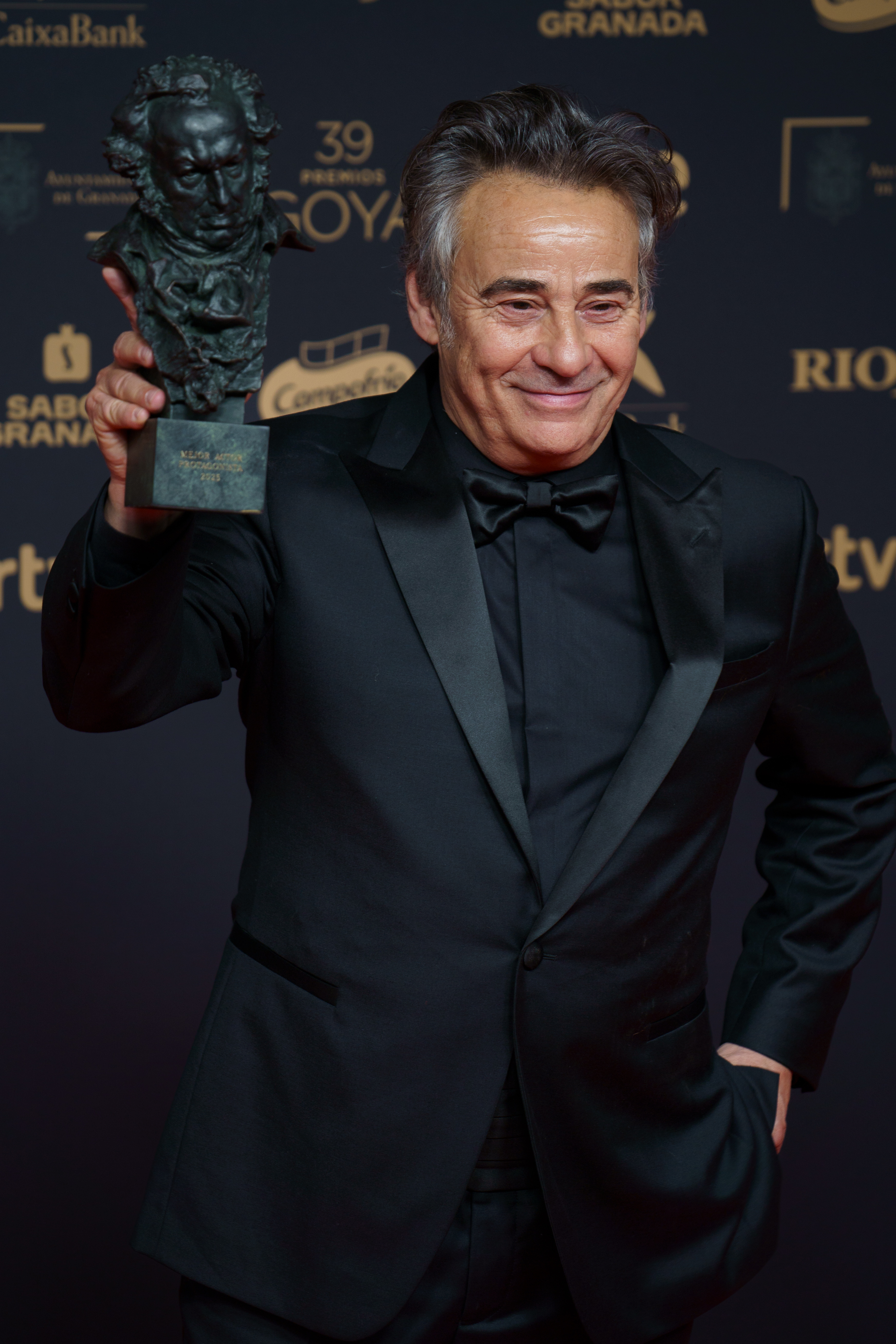
Fernández holding his Goya Award for Best Leading Performance for Marco, the Invented Truth

Fernández has been recognized by the Academy of Cinematographic Arts and Sciences of Spain for the following:

- 14th Goya Awards: Best New Actor, nominated, for Washington Wolves (1999)
- 16th Goya Awards: Best Actor, win, for Fausto 5.0 (2001) and Best Supporting Actor, nomination, for Sound of the Sea (2001)
- 18th Goya Awards, Best Supporting Actor, win, for In the City (2003)
- 19th Goya Awards, Best Actor, nomination, for Things That Make Living Worthwhile (2004)
- 20th Goya Awards, Best Supporting Actor, nomination, for The Method (2005)
- 25th Goya Awards, Best Supporting Actor, nomination, for Biutiful (2010)
- 28th Goya Awards, Best Actor, nomination, for All the Women (2013)
- 29th Goya Awards, Best Supporting Actor, nomination, for El Niño (2014)
- 31st Goya Awards, Best Actor, nomination, for Smoke & Mirrors (2016)
- 33rd Goya Awards, Best Supporting Actor, nomination, for Everybody Knows (2018)
- 34th Goya Awards, Best Supporting Actor, win, for While at War (2019)
- 36th Goya Awards, Best Actor, nomination, for Mediterraneo: The Law of the Sea (2021)
- 39th Goya Awards, Best Actor, win, for Marco, the Invented Truth (2024)
