= Cold case =

Unsolved crime not now being investigated

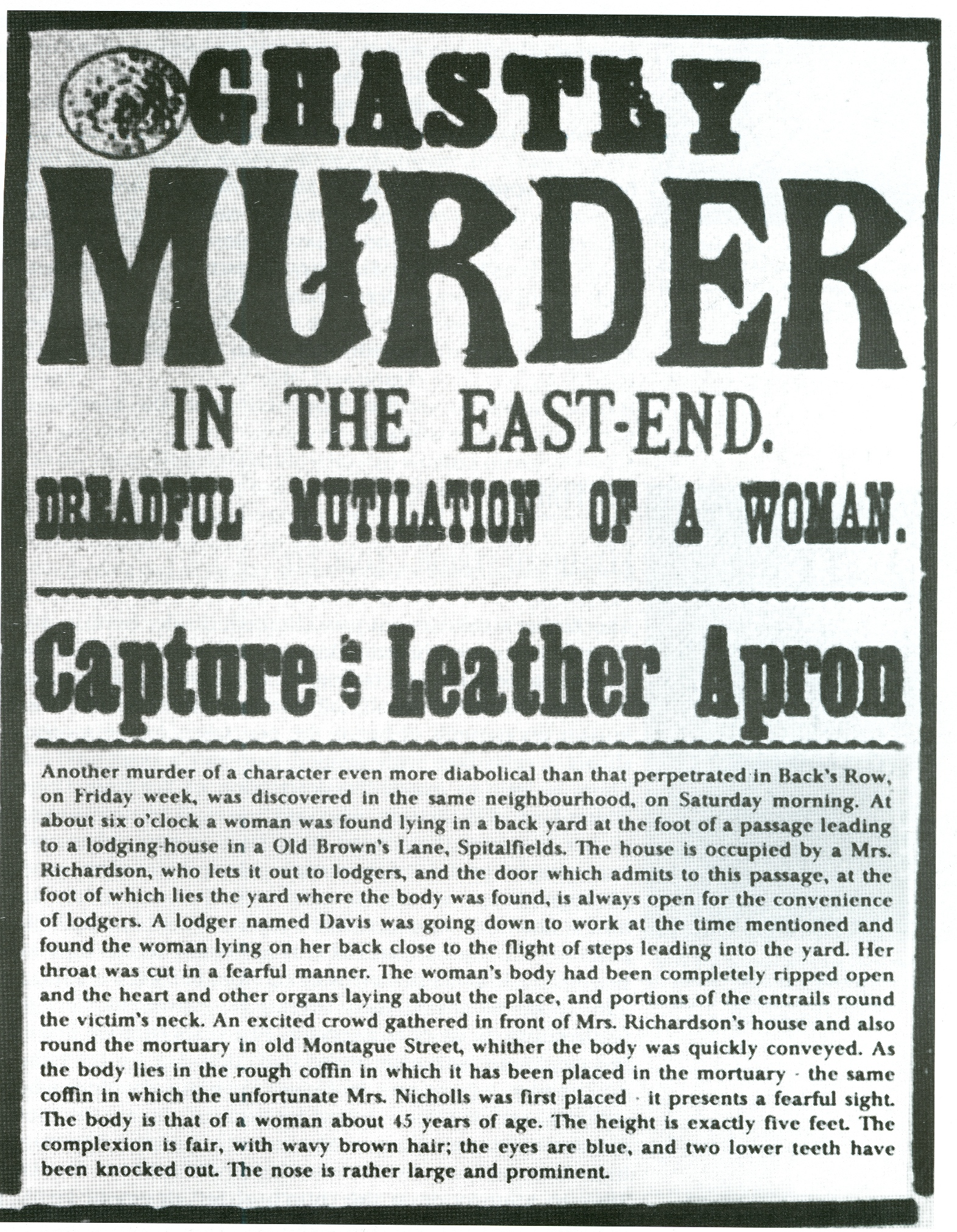
A leaflet issued during the "autumn of terror" in 1888, when Jack the Ripper was active

A cold case is an unsolved crime that is not the subject of a current criminal investigation, but for which new information could emerge.

== Characteristics ==
=== Violent or major crime ===
Typically, cold cases are violent and other major felony crimes, such as murder and rape, which—unlike unsolved minor crimes—are generally not subject to a statute of limitations. Sometimes disappearances can also be considered cold cases if the victim has not been seen or heard from for some time, such as the case of Natalee Holloway or the Beaumont children.

=== Solve rate ===
Although advances in forensic science and investigative techniques have helped solve many older cases, a substantial number of homicides remain unsolved each year in the United States, resulting in a growing backlog of cold cases.

=== Suspect identification ===
In the search for suspects, some police organizations have created websites featuring cold cases. For example, the Texas Rangers have established a website in the hopes that it shall elicit new information and investigative leads.

=== Tunnel vision ===
Sometimes, a viable suspect has been overlooked or simply ignored due to then-flimsy circumstantial evidence, the presence of a likelier suspect (who is later proven to be innocent), or simply for the focus itself to exclude other possibilities.

=== Improvements in forensics ===
With the advent of and improvements to DNA testing/DNA profiling and other forensics technology, many cold cases are being re-opened and prosecuted. Police departments are opening cold case units whose job is to re-examine cold case files. DNA evidence helps in such cases but as in the case of fingerprints, it is of no value unless there is evidence on file to compare it to. However, to combat that issue, the FBI is switching from using the Integrated Automated Fingerprint Identification System (IAFIS) to using a newer technology called the Next Generation Identification (NGI). Other improvements in forensics lie in fields such as:

- Digital forensics, one application of which is to recover hidden or deleted data.
- Ballistics analysis which involves the evaluation of ammunition and firearms to determine which weapon might have been used in a crime.
- Forensic anthropology which analyzes skeletal remains to determine their cause of death or any other relevant information.
- Mobile forensics and social media which, since their creation, have had increased involvement in any police case, cold or not.
- Forensic psychology which can be used to analyze crime scenes and identify suspect profiles.
- Facial recognition which has been used to identify suspects based on their facial features.
- Artificial intelligence (AI) which is used in all of the above systems to help analyze data and information from crime scenes.

== Famous criminal examples ==
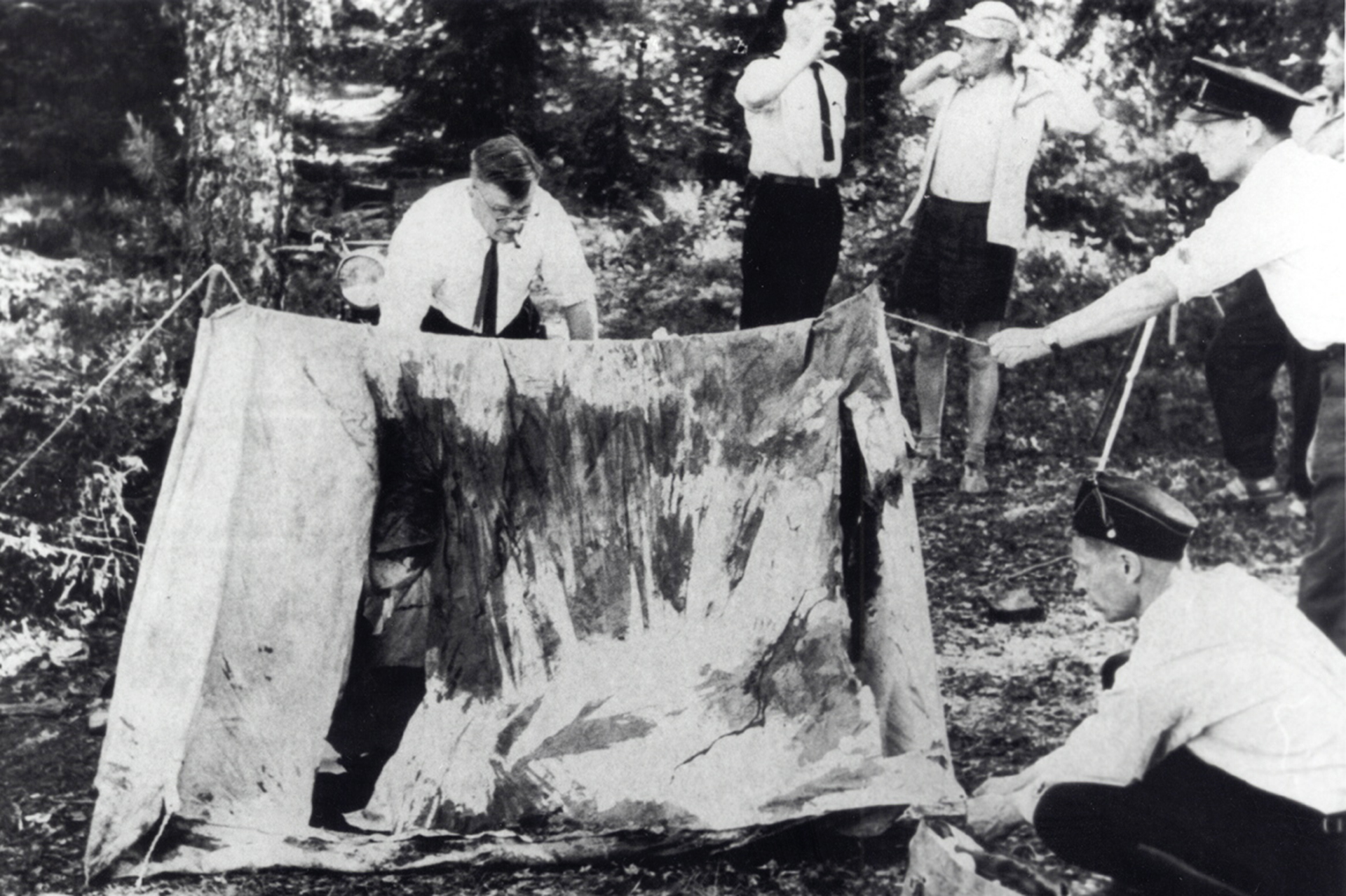
Lake Bodom murders in Finland is one of the most famous unsolved homicide cases in Finnish criminal history. The tent is investigated immediately after the murders in 1960.

The identity of Jack the Ripper is a notorious example of an outstanding cold case, with numerous suggestions as to the identity of the serial killer. Similarly, the Zodiac Killer has been studied extensively for almost 50 years, with numerous suspects discussed and debated. The perpetrators of the Wall Street bombing of 1920 have never been positively identified, though the Galleanists, a group of Italian anarchists, are widely believed to have planned the explosion. The burning of the Reichstag building in 1933 remains controversial and although Marinus van der Lubbe was tried, convicted and executed for arson, it is possible that the Reichstag fire was perpetrated by the Nazis to enhance their power and destroy democracy in Germany.

== Examples of criminal cold cases that ended in conviction ==
Victim(s)	Convicted	Location	Crime date	Conviction date	Description
Victims of Nazis' Neuengamme Concentration Camp (sub-camp in Meppen, Germany)	Friedrich Karl Berger	Meppen, Germany	January 1945 to March 1945	March 5, 2020	In a deportation case tried in 2020 in U.S. Immigration Court in Memphis, Tennessee, US (therefore not strictly a criminal prosecution), Friedrich Karl Berger was adjudged complicit in Nazi crimes of persecution committed while serving as an armed guard for the SS in Meppen, Germany, at a sub-camp of the Neuengamme concentration camp during World War II. This decision, reported in a March 5, 2020, United States Department of Justice press release, is likely the oldest criminal conduct (75 years) ever proved against a defendant in court by prosecutors in the United States. The judge ordered Berger deported to his native Germany, as his appeal was dismissed in November 2020. Germany would opt to dismiss criminal charges against Berger in December 2020. However, Berger who was a member of the Kriegsmarine, and later worked in building wire-stripping machines, was deported in February 2021.
Harold Blauer	The Central Intelligence Agency	New York City, New York, US	January 8, 1953	1987	Retired tennis player who was unwittingly injected with 3,4-Methylenedioxyamphetamine (MDA) after checking himself in to the New York Psychiatric Institute for depression. The experiment was part of the CIA's secret mind-control program, MKULTRA, and Blauer's medical records were altered to hide the real cause of his death. MKULTRA was revealed to the public in 1975, and Blauer's estate was awarded $700,000 in damages in 1987.
Frank Olson	The Central Intelligence Agency	New York City, New York, US	November 28, 1953	1976	A CIA bacteriologist and biological warfare expert who was unwittingly dosed with LSD by his supervisor. Nine days later, Olson had a nervous breakdown and jumped from his 13th-story room at Hotel Pennsylvania. Olson's family agreed to withdraw a wrongful death lawsuit against the agency in exchange for an out-of-court settlement of $750,000 and apologies from President Gerald Ford and CIA director William Colby. Olson's children ordered a new autopsy in 1994 and tried to reopen the case as murder in 1996 and 2012, but both requests were denied because of the previous deal.
Richard Phillips, Milton Curtis	Gerald Mason	El Segundo, California, US	1957	2003	Two police officers were shot when they pulled over a car for running a red light. Mason was arrested 45 years later after a computerized fingerprint database identified him as the purchaser of the murder weapon. At the time, he had just raped a 15-year-old girl at gunpoint at a local lovers' lane, and he killed the officers to avoid prosecution for the crime. Mason's back still bore the scar left by a bullet fired by the officers as he fled.
Irene Garza	John Feit	McAllen, Texas, US	April 16, 1960	December 8, 2017	A 26-year-old beauty queen who disappeared when she went to church for confession and was later found raped and murdered in a canal. Feit, a 27-year-old priest at the church who later pled no contest to raping a parishioner, and left the priesthood in the 1970s, was a suspect since the beginning, but little investigation was made due to the opposition of long-time district attorney Rene Guerra (1980–2014).
John Orner	Edward Freiburger	Columbia, South Carolina, US	February 1961	2002	A 60-year-old cab driver who was robbed and murdered on the job with a .32 H&R pistol. Freiburger, then 19 and a soldier stationed at nearby Fort Jackson, became a suspect when it was discovered that he purchased the same weapon at a local pawnshop only hours before Orner received his last dispatch call, after which he went AWOL. Freiburger was stopped by Tennessee State Police a month later and found with the gun in his possession, but ballistics tests were inconclusive and he was never charged. In 2002, a private firearms examiner working for the South Carolina Law Enforcement Division cleaned up the slugs and matched the bullets to the gun.
Malika Maria de Fernandez	Peter Reyn-Bardt	Wilmslow, England, UK	June 1961	December 1983	Reyn-Bardt, De Fernandez's estranged husband, made a detailed confession about how he had murdered, dismembered and disposed of her body in the bog behind his home after peat cutters found human remains there, 22 years later. Although Carbon 14 testing later showed the remains to be thousands of years old, Reyn-Bardt's confession was considered enough evidence to convict him of the murder of his wife, whose body was never found.
Addie Mae Collins, Cynthia Wesley, Carole Robertson, Carol Denise McNair (plus 22 injured)	Robert Edward Chambliss	Birmingham, Alabama, US	1963	1977	Victims of the 16th Street Baptist Church bombing. Although the FBI had identified Chambliss, Blanton, Cherry and a fourth Klansman, Herman Frank Cash, as the perpetrators already in 1965, no arrests were made for political reasons, and the case was shelved in 1968. Cash died in 1994 without being prosecuted.
Addie Mae Collins, Cynthia Wesley, Carole Robertson, Carol Denise McNair (plus 22 injured)	Thomas Edwin Blanton Jr.	Birmingham, Alabama, US	1963	2001	Victims of the 16th Street Baptist Church bombing. Although the FBI had identified Chambliss, Blanton, Cherry and a fourth Klansman, Herman Frank Cash, as the perpetrators already in 1965, no arrests were made for political reasons, and the case was shelved in 1968. Cash died in 1994 without being prosecuted.
Addie Mae Collins, Cynthia Wesley, Carole Robertson, Carol Denise McNair (plus 22 injured)	Bobby Frank Cherry	Birmingham, Alabama, US	1963	2002	Victims of the 16th Street Baptist Church bombing. Although the FBI had identified Chambliss, Blanton, Cherry and a fourth Klansman, Herman Frank Cash, as the perpetrators already in 1965, no arrests were made for political reasons, and the case was shelved in 1968. Cash died in 1994 without being prosecuted.
James Keuler	Samuel Evans	Seattle, Washington, US	June 1968	2011	Evans, already incarcerated for other crimes, entered an Alford plea after DNA linked him to Keuler's crime scene. Oldest case ever solved using DNA evidence.
Helen Betty Osborne	Dwayne Archie Johnston	The Pas, Manitoba, Canada	November 13, 1971	December 1987	A Cree Aboriginal woman abducted while she was walking home at 2:30 pm and subsequently beaten, raped and stabbed over 50 times. Although four Caucasian men were implicated in the murder, only Johnston was convicted for it after 16 years, and the case was officially closed on February 12, 1999. The government of Manitoba officially apologized for its poor handling of the case on July 14, 2000.
Jackson and Daisy Schley	Samuel Evans	Seattle, Washington, US	January 9, 1972	2011	A couple attacked during a home invasion. Jackson was murdered and Daisy was abducted and raped. Evans entered another Alford Plea for the murder after his DNA was matched to semen recovered from Daisy's clothing. Daisy died of unrelated causes in 2007, before Evans was identified.
Steven Stayner	Kenneth Parnell	Merced, California, US	December 4, 1972	1981	A seven-year-old boy kidnapped and held in captivity for eight years by Parnell, a pedophile. After Stayner hit puberty, Parnell lost interest in him and kidnapped five-year-old Timmy White from Ukiah, California as his replacement. However, Stayner and White escaped on March 1, 1980, while Parnell was at work, leading to his identification and arrest.
Joseph, Julie, Joseph Jr. and Josephine Otero	Dennis Rader	Wichita, Kansas, US	January 15, 1974	August 18, 2005	A family victim of "BTK", a serial killer who would invade homes and kill women after stalking them for long periods; other members became unintended victims when they returned home earlier than expected. BTK would later write taunting letters to the media and police about his crimes. Rader's arrest was made possible by metadata found in a floppy disk he sent to police and a partial DNA match to his daughter. Neither technology existed at the time he committed the murders.
Kathryn Bright	Dennis Rader	Wichita, Kansas, US	April 4, 1974	August 18, 2005	A family victim of "BTK", a serial killer who would invade homes and kill women after stalking them for long periods; other members became unintended victims when they returned home earlier than expected. BTK would later write taunting letters to the media and police about his crimes. Rader's arrest was made possible by metadata found in a floppy disk he sent to police and a partial DNA match to his daughter. Neither technology existed at the time he committed the murders.
Lizbeth Wilson	John Henry Horton	Prairie Village, Kansas, US	July 1974	2003	A 13-year-old girl last seen running across the field of Shawnee Mission East High School by her brother, who was racing ahead of her. Her remains were found in an empty field six months later. Horton became a suspect because he was the only adult working on the school grounds at the time, and the investigation revealed that he had taken a suspicious break and also tried previously to lure other girls into the school. A duffel bag and a bottle of chloroform was found in his car, which Horton claimed using to "get high", but this was deemed circumstantial. In 2002, investigators interviewed an overlooked 15-year-old girl at the time of the murder who had been given chloroform by Horton and was sexually molested while she was unconscious. However, the Kansas Supreme Court overturned Horton's conviction in 2005 on the basis that the "prior bad act" had not been placed on the public record and the testimony should not have been allowed. Leave to re-try and re-file the case was granted, and this time the same evidence and the testimony of two fellow inmates was enough to declare him guilty.
Katherine and Sheila Lyon	Lloyd Lee Welch	Washington, D.C., US	March 25, 1975	September 12, 2017	Two sisters aged 10 and 12 who disappeared during a trip to a shopping mall. For decades, the police centered their efforts in locating a 50 to 60 years old man who was seen playing a tape recorder with children in different malls. However, in 2013 the attention shifted to Welch, by then a convicted and incarcerated child molester. Welch, who was 18 in 1975, strongly resembled another man seen stalking the girls by one of their friends, and it was found that in 1975 Welch himself went to the police, claiming that he had seen the older man abducting the girls. After a cousin of Welch confessed to helping him burning two suspicious duffel bags in his property of Thaxton, Virginia in 1975, the police searched the place and found items that had belonged to the girls. While no trace of their bodies was found, Welch pleaded guilty to both counts of abduction and murder.
Jean Savage	James Franklin Rose	Delray Beach, Florida, US	April 4, 1975	November 19, 2018	A 37-year-old housewife who was found raped and stabbed to death inside her house. Savage's murder remained unsolved for 40 years until 2015, when cold case investigators identified the killer as James Franklin Rose, a death row inmate awaiting execution for the 1976 kidnap-murder of a young girl, after the DNA testing matched Rose's DNA to the suspect's DNA in the case of Savage's murder. Rose was charged in 2016 with the murder, and sentenced to life without parole in 2018 after he pleaded guilty in order to escape a second death sentence.
Myrna Opsahl	Emily and William Harris, Kathleen Ann Soliah, Michael Bortin	Carmichael, California, US	April 21, 1975	November 7, 2002	A 42-year-old customer killed during the robbery of the Crocker National Bank by the Symbionese Liberation Army. The case was revived only in 1999, after Soliah (indicted for the attempted bombing of two LAPD patrol cars in August 1975) was arrested in Minnesota, thanks to a tip from a neighbor who had watched her case featured in America's Most Wanted.
Myrna Opsahl	James Kilgore	Carmichael, California, US	April 21, 1975	2003	Arrested on November 8, 2002, in South Africa, where he was living under an alias, and extradited to the United States. He was the last SLA member to be apprehended and convicted.
Martha Moxley	Michael Skakel	Greenwich, Connecticut, US	October 30, 1975	2002	A 15-year-old girl last seen talking to Skakel's brother, Thomas, at a party, and who was bludgeoned and stabbed with a golf club that was traced back to the Skakel home. Over the years, suspicions switched from Thomas to Michael, who was an alcoholic and peeping tom at the time of the murder (when he was also 15) and who was said to have bragged about getting away with murder due to his family's connection to the Kennedys. Skakel was convicted of the murder in 2002, and again on retrial, in 2016.
Claude Snelling	Joseph James DeAngelo	Visalia, California, US	December 12, 1975	August 21, 2020	Claude Snelling, a 45-year-old journalism professor, was fatally shot when he intervened in the attempted kidnapping of his 16-year-old daughter by the prolific, unidentified burglar known as the Visalia Ransacker; The Ransacker escaped and vanished afterward. In 2018, police announced that the Ransacker was also the unidentified serial killer known as the Original Night Stalker, and that his real identity was DeAngelo, who was identified as the Stalker by a DNA match. DeAngelo was a police officer in nearby Exeter during the Ransacker's spree. DeAngelo was charged with Snelling's murder because of undisclosed, non-genetic evidence. DeAngelo plead guilty to Claude Snellings murder along with 12 others and was sentenced to life imprisonment without the possibility of parole
Carol Hutto	James B. Kuenn	Largo, Florida, US	December 1976	February 10, 2000	A 16-year-old girl whose body was found in a lake near an abandoned house. She was last seen alive the night before when she received a call. Suspicion fell on her 17-year-old half-brother Jerry Irwin, a known juvenile delinquent who had stayed out all night and whose route home took him past the house and lake. However, the real murderer was Hutto's boyfriend, James B. Kuenn, who later joined the US Navy and served in a submarine. In 1998, Kuenn confessed to NCIS agents that he had killed Hutto and disposed of her body after she refused to have sex with him. Kuenn's confession was confirmed by DNA.
Shirley Vian	Dennis Rader	Wichita, Kansas, US	March 17, 1977	August 18, 2005	See above.
Susan Clarke	Ralph Andrews	Skokie, Illinois, US	August 28, 1977	March 2003	Clarke disappeared from a babysitting job in Lincolnwood, and her body was found in a vegetable garden two days later. She had been strangled, stabbed and mutilated. A man named Ralph Andrews was suspected early on, but not charged due to a lack of evidence. Years later, after he was convicted in an unrelated 1991 murder, he was charged and eventually pleaded guilty to the Clarke murder, receiving a life sentence.
Nancy Fox	Dennis Rader	Wichita, Kansas, US	March 17, 1977	August 18, 2005	See above.
Brian and Katie Maggiore	Joseph James DeAngelo	Rancho Cordova, California, US	February 2, 1978	August 21, 2020	A young couple chased and fatally shot while walking their dog at night. The murders were attributed to the unidentified East Area Rapist, who committed over 50 home invasions and rapes around the time in Northern California, after pre-tied shoelaces with his signature diamond-type knot were found at the crime scene. The EAR was discovered to be the Original Night Stalker after DNA from both sprees was matched in 2001, and in turn, identified as DeAngelo through family DNA in 2018. DeAngelo was pled guilty to the murders of the Maggories and 11 others and was sentenced to life without the possibility of parole.
Deana Lynne Bowdoin	Clarence Wayne Dixon	Tempe, Arizona, US	January 7, 1978	January 24, 2008	A 21-year-old woman who was strangled and stabbed to death in her apartment. In 2001, DNA profiling linked Dixon to the crime, a former neighbor of Bowdoin's, who was serving a life sentence for a 1986 sexual-assault conviction. Dixon was formally sentenced to death for the murder in January 2008 and was executed in May 2022.
Melvin "Ricky" Pittman, Ernest Taylor, Alvin Turner, Randy Johnson, Michael McDowell	Philander Hampton	Newark, New Jersey, US	August 20, 1978	August 2011	Five African-American teenagers who disappeared at once from Newark's Clinton Avenue. In 2008, while being interrogated for an unrelated case, Hampton confessed to having helped his cousin, local contractor Lee Anthony Evans, in luring the victims to an empty house with the promise of work, then locking them in a room and setting the house ablaze. Hampton led investigators to the place of the fire but no human remains were found. In spite of this, Hampton pleaded guilty and was convicted of five counts of murder, while Evans, who claimed innocence, was acquitted.
Etan Patz	Pedro Hernandez	New York City, New York, US	May 25, 1979	April 18, 2017	A 6-year-old boy who disappeared on his way to a school stop; his disappearance helped launch the missing child movement and he was the first child with a photo on a milk carton. For decades, suspicion was cast on a convicted child molester, Jose Antonio Ramos. However, Hernandez's brother-in-law identified him as the real perpetrator in 2012, claiming that he had confessed publicly at his church in the 1980s and that his guilt was an open secret in his family. Hernandez confessed again after his arrest, but doubts about his mental health delayed a guilty verdict until 2017.
Floralba Sánchez	Pedro López	El Espinal, Tolima, Colombia	1979	1995	The only identified victim of López, one of the most prolific serial killers of all time, in his native Colombia. López was tried after he completed his controversial 16-year-long sentence in Ecuador and was deported to his home country.
Robert Offerman and Debra Manning	Joseph James DeAngelo	Goleta, California, US	December 30, 1979	August 21, 2020	The two first victims of the Original Night Stalker in his Southern California spree. DeAngelo pled guilty in 2020 to their murders along with 11 others and was sentenced to life without the possibility of parole.
Charlene and Lyman Smith, Keith and Patrice Harrington, Manuela Witthun, Cheri Domingo and Gregory Sanchez, Janelle Cruz	Joseph James DeAngelo	Ventura, Dana Point, Irvine, and Goleta, California, US	March 13, 1980 – May 4, 1986	April 24, 2018	Southern California couples and lone women targeted by the Original Night Stalker, whose M.O. included stalking his victims for a prolonged time, invading their homes, binding them, raping the women while the men watched, and then killing both by either shooting or bludgeoning. DeAngelo was identified by police after DNA from the crime scenes was uploaded to a fake profile in the open-source DNA database GEDmatch, and found to have distant relatives among its users. DeAngelo pled guilty in 2020 to their murders along with 5 others and was sentenced to life without the possibility of parole.
Suzanne Bombardier	Mitchell Lynn Bacom	Antioch, California, US	June 22, 1980	December 11, 2017	A 14-year-old girl kidnapped, raped and stabbed to death. Her body was found floating in the San Joaquin River. DNA found in the body was matched to Bacom, a registered sex offender with three prison sentences served. Bacom was convicted of first degree murder and was sentenced to life without the possibility of parole.
Roger Wheeler	Johnny Martorano, Steve Flemmi	Tulsa, Oklahoma, US	May 27, 1981	2001	The owner of World Jai Alai, murdered in his car by members of the Winter Hill Gang after he discovered that they were stealing funds from his corporation. Whitey Bulger (a fugitive since 1999) and H. Paul Rico, who died before trial, were also indicted.
Dennis Gibson	Tracy Petrocelli	Calico, California, US	November 19, 1981	2005	Gibson was chronologically the second victim to be murdered by serial killer Tracy Petrocelli, who was convicted of another two murders in Nevada and Washington. Petrocelli was sentenced to 15 years to life in prison for Gibson's murder in May 2009.
Green River Killer victims	Gary Ridgway	Near Seattle and Tacoma, Washington, US	July 8, 1982 – March 5, 1990	December 18, 2003	48 prostitutes and runaways raped and strangled after being picked up along Pacific Highway South. Ridgway was identified in 2001 after a DNA test was made on samples collected from him already in 1987. Ridgway also killed a 49th woman in 1998, 38-year-old Patricia Yellowrobe.
Kalinka Bamberski	Dieter Krombach	Lindau, Bavaria, Germany	July 9, 1982	October 22, 2011	A French 14-year-old girl who died in the home of her German doctor stepfather (Krombach) after being injected with a cobalt-iron solution. Because German authorities declined to prosecute Krombach in spite of his testimony being inconsistent about the purpose of the injection and with the autopsy report, Bamberski's biological father, André, lobbied for Krombach to be prosecuted in France. Krombach was tried in absentia in 1995 and found guilty, but the verdict was annulled by the European Court of Human Rights in 2001. In 2009, Bamberski had Krombach abducted from his home and delivered to a French police station in Alsace, where he was arrested. Krombach was tried again and sentenced to 15 years in prison, while Bamberski received a one-year suspended sentence for his abduction in 2014. Since 1997, several German women have come forward claiming that Krombach drugged and raped them as teenagers.
Dos Erres massacre	Manuel Pop, Reyes Collin Gualip, Daniel Martínez Hernández, Carlos Carías	La Libertad, El Petén, Guatemala	December 6, 1982	August 2, 2011	Over 200 unarmed Maya people murdered in a punitive expedition of the Guatemalan Army Kaibiles during the presidency of Efraín Ríos Montt, mostly by bludgeoning. Each convict was sentenced to 6,060 years in prison for the crimes.
Dos Erres massacre	Pedro Pimentel Ríos	La Libertad, El Petén, Guatemala	December 6, 1982	March 12, 2012	Over 200 unarmed Maya people murdered in a punitive expedition of the Guatemalan Army Kaibiles during the presidency of Efraín Ríos Montt, mostly by bludgeoning. Each convict was sentenced to 6,060 years in prison for the crimes.
Jeanine Nicarico	Brian Dugan	Naperville, Illinois, US	February 23, 1983	November 11, 2009	A ten-year-old girl kidnapped from her home by a burglar and subsequently raped and murdered. Two men, Alejandro Hernandez and Rolando Cruz, were convicted in several trials before they were respectively acquitted in 1995, and pardoned by the Governor in 2002. Dugan, who pleaded guilty to the crime in 2009, had already confessed to it in 1985.
Elaine Graham	Edmond Jay Marr	Los Angeles, California, US	March 1983	2005	A 29-year-old nurse and student at California State University at Northridge who was abducted and murdered. Marr became a suspect when he was seen in the immediate area of her disappearance and at a sister's home only a few blocks from where the victim's car was found. Her skeletal remains were found by hikers in a wooded area halfway between where she was last seen alive and where the car was found, some six months later. A knife found in the suspect's possession when he was arrested for armed robbery a month later, was later proven to be the murder weapon when DNA evidence matched blood found in the knife's crevices.
Grace and Candice Reed, and Joshua Durocher	Michael Durocher	Jacksonville, Florida, US	November 1983	January 1990	Serial killer Michael Durocher murdered his son Joshua, as well as his girlfriend and her daughter, Grace and Candice Reed, in 1983. He confessed to the crime seven years later while in prison for killing two more people. Durocher was sentenced to death and executed in 1993 for the triple murder.
Mark Tildesley	Leslie Bailey	Wokingham, England, UK	June 1, 1984	December 9, 1992	A seven-year-old boy who disappeared while visiting a funfair in Wokingham, Berkshire, England on the evening of 1 June 1984. He was lured away from the fair and his bicycle was found chained to railings nearby. In 1990 it emerged that Mark had been abducted, drugged, tortured, raped and murdered by a London-based paedophile gang on the night he disappeared. His body has never been found.
Paula Godfrey	John Edward Robinson	Overland Park, Kansas, US	September 1, 1984	October 2003	A 19-year-old woman vanished after she was hired by Robinson, a con man and serial killer, to work as a sales representative for his shell company. Her body was never found.
Elisabeth Fritzl	Josef Fritzl	Amstetten, Austria	August 29, 1984	March 14, 2009	An 18-year-old girl imprisoned in an underground cell and raped by her father for 24 years, resulting in the birth of seven children. The truth was discovered when one of their daughters was admitted to a hospital with life-threatening kidney failure.
Angela Samota	Donald Andrew Bess Jr.	Dallas, Texas, US	12 October 1984	June 2010	A SMU student raped and killed in her apartment. Bess was identified in 2008 by a DNA match while he was serving life imprisonment for another offense. He was tried, convicted, and given the death penalty. He died in prison in October 2022.
Kylie Maybury	Gregory Keith Davies	Melbourne, Victoria, Australia	November 6, 1984	May 29, 2017	A six-year-old girl kidnapped, drugged, raped and murdered after leaving a convenience store on Melbourne Cup Day. Davies became a suspect only in 2014, when Victoria Police made a public call for help.
Tiffany Stasi	John Edward Robinson	Overland Park, Kansas, US	January 9, 1985	October 2002	The four-month-old daughter of a 19-year-old single mother who Robinson met at a battered women's shelter. Robinson promised her a job, home and daycare for the baby in Chicago, and days later gave the baby to his own brother, who had been unable to conceive, under the claim that the mother had committed suicide. Stasi's identity was confirmed by DNA in 2000. Robinson was also convicted for the murder of the mother (whose body was never found), but the conviction was overturned on technicalities in November 2015.
Jonathan Sohus	Christian Gerhartsreiter	San Marino, California, US	February 1985	August 15, 2013	The neighbor of Gerhartsreiter, a con man. After Sohus and his wife Linda disappeared, Gerhartsreiter told other people that they had moved to Europe, and was later pulled over by police while driving Sohus's car under an alias. In 1994, the dismembered skeleton of a man was disinterred in the Sohus home, but he could not be identified until 2010 because Sohus was adopted and his DNA could not be compared to his known relatives.
Marine Hedge	Dennis Rader	Park City, Kansas, US	April 27, 1985	August 18, 2005	See above
Gail Katz-Bierenbaum	Robert Bierenbaum	New York City, New York, US	July 7, 1985	October 2000	A licensed pilot's wife who disappeared. Her husband was convicted of murder after it was learned that he took an unexplained two-hour-flight over the Atlantic Ocean the day she went missing.
Debra Jackson, Henrietta Wright, Barbara Ware, Bernita Sparks, Mary Lowe, Lachrica Jefferson, Monique Alexander, Margette Washington	Lonnie David Franklin, Jr.	Los Angeles, California, US	August 10, 1985 – c. September 11, 1988	August 10, 2016	Eight African-American women raped (and in the first seven cases, murdered) by a serial killer who went dormant for two decades after the last victim survived. Law enforcement was led to Franklin after the killer's DNA was partially matched to his son, who was incarcerated on an unrelated weapons charge, in 2010. A full match was subsequently extracted from a piece of pizza partially eaten by Franklin.
Hugh Scrutton	Ted Kaczynski	Sacramento, California, US	December 11, 1985	January 22, 1998	A computer store owner killed by a bomb planted in his parking lot by a neo-luddite terrorist.
Edit Fintor, Ilona Sőrés; Andrea, Dániel, Zoltán and Tünde Pándy	Ágnes and András Pándy	Brussels, Belgium	1986–1990	March 6, 2002	The successive wives and stepchildren of András Pándy, who told people that they had left for other countries and forged evidence to make it look like they were still alive. After their arrest during an unrelated investigation in 1997, Ágnes, the eldest stepdaughter, confessed that she had helped Pándy in the murders and disposing of the bodies.
Thomas Underwood	Michael Durocher	Jacksonville, Florida, US	January 1986	January 1989	Serial killer Michael Durocher murdered Thomas Underwood during a robbery in 1986. The case remained unsolved off three years before Durocher confessed to the crime while he was facing a life sentence for another murder. Durocher was sentenced to death for killing Underwood, but he was ultimately executed for an unrelated triple murder he previously committed in 1983.
Sherri Rasmussen	Stephanie Lazarus	Van Nuys, California, US	February 24, 1986	March 2012	A 29-year-old woman killed during a home invasion. The case was classified as a robbery gone wrong until 2009, when DNA from a bite mark on Rasmussen's body was identified as female and detectives reviewing the case determined that the robbery had been staged. The DNA was positively matched to Lazarus, who had had an affair with Rasmussen's husband shortly before she was killed.
Michelle Dorr	Hadden Clark	Silver Spring, Maryland, US	May 24, 1986	1999	A six-year-old girl who disappeared from her father's backyard while he was taking a nap. The father confessed to the murder in a psychotic episode, but was later exonerated. Clark offered to disclose the body's location as part of a plea deal; though the deal was not made, he still showed police where to find Dorr's body after his conviction.
Samantha Knight	Michael Guider	Bondi, New South Wales, Australia	August 19, 1986	August 28, 2002	A nine-year-old girl abducted from her home. Guider, a self-educated expert on Aboriginal sites of the Sydney area, aroused the suspicions of journalists working with him when he made several bizarre statements about Knight. Eventually, Guider confessed to have drugged and molested several girls in New South Wales through the 1980s, with Knight dying from an accidental overdose. Guider also led police to the place he buried Knight; no body was found, likely because the area was altered later for development, but cadaver dogs reacted positively to the site.
Vicki Wegerle	Dennis Rader	Wichita, Kansas, US	September 16, 1986	August 18, 2005	See above.
Lita McClinton	Phillip Anthony Harwood	Atlanta, Georgia, US	January 16, 1987	1997	A 35-year-old woman killed by a hitman (Harwood) on behalf of her ex-husband (Sullivan), who was in Florida at the time of the murder. Sullivan fled to Thailand after Harwood was arrested in 1997, but was extradited to the US in 2004.
Lita McClinton	James Sullivan	Atlanta, Georgia, US	January 16, 1987	March 2006	A 35-year-old woman killed by a hitman (Harwood) on behalf of her ex-husband (Sullivan), who was in Florida at the time of the murder. Sullivan fled to Thailand after Harwood was arrested in 1997, but was extradited to the US in 2004.
Catherine Clampitt	John Edward Robinson	Overland Park, Kansas, US	June 15, 1987	October 2003	A 27-year-old woman from Texas who disappeared after being hired by Robinson. Her body was never found.
Carlina White	Annugetta "Ann" Pettway	New York City, New York, US	August 5, 1987	July 30, 2012	A 19-day-old infant kidnapped from Harlem Hospital Center by a woman posing as a nurse, who then raised her as her own daughter. White (raised as Nejdra "Netty" Nance) solved her own kidnapping when she was 23 years old, after checking missing children websites and contacting her birth family.
Isabelle Laville, Farida Hellegouarch, Fabienne Leroy, Jeanne-Marie Desramault, Elisabeth Brichet, Natacha Danais	Michel Fourniret	Northern France and Belgium	December 11, 1987 – November 1990	May 28, 2008	Victims of Fourniret's first serial raping and killing spree. After going dormant in 1990, Fourniret resumed his crimes in Belgium in 2000, and killed two more teenage girls before being apprehended in 2003.
Richard Mason, Kenneth Griffith, Earl Smock	Frank Casteel	Chattanooga, Tennessee, US	1988	2003	Three men shot for trespassing in private farmland while going for a swim. The conviction rested on the three men being registered in a logbook of trespassers kept by Casteel and given to police by his mistress.
Lisa Marie Kimmel	Dale Wayne Eaton	Casper, Wyoming, US	April 2, 1988	March 20, 2004	An 18-year-old woman who was raped and murdered during a road trip from Billings, Montana to Cody, Wyoming. In 2002, male DNA found in Kimmel's body was matched to Eaton, who was serving a sentence for a 1997 kidnapping in Colorado. Kimmel's car was also found buried in Eaton's property.
Betty Jane May	Daryl Mack	Reno, Nevada, US	October 28, 1988	May 15, 2002	A 55-year-old woman who was raped and strangled to death in her basement room. In 2002, DNA evidence linked Mack to the murder. Mack was already serving a life sentence for a 1994 murder. He was sentenced to death for May's murder in 2002 and executed in 2006 after waiving his appeals.
Pan Am Flight 103	Abdelbaset al-Megrahi	Lockerbie, Scotland, UK	December 21, 1988	January 31, 2001	A transatlantic flight covering the route between Frankfurt and Detroit that was destroyed by a bomb, killing all 243 passengers, 16 crew and 11 people on the ground. Two employees at Libyan Arab Airlines were tried in a special court set in Camp Zeist, Netherlands, with al-Megrahi being found guilty and sentenced to life in prison and the other, Lamin Khalifah Fhimah, being acquitted. al-Megrahi was released on health concerns in 2009 and died of cancer in Libya in 2012.
Cheryl Anne Commesso	Franklin Delano Floyd	Pinellas County, Florida, US	1989	c. 2001	An 18-year-old exotic dancer who disappeared after having an argument with Floyd, the husband of a coworker, Sharon Marshall. Commesso's remains were found in 1995 and identified in 1996. Around the same time, pictures depicting Commesso bound and beaten were found in a truck stolen by Floyd in Oklahoma and abandoned in Texas. Floyd was initially deemed unfit to stand trial on the grounds of mental health, which he denied and fought vigorously. He was subsequently tried and sentenced to death.
Katharine and Robert Baskin	Marvin L. Maple	Murfreesboro, Tennessee, US	March 10, 1989	c. 2009	Two eight and seven-year-old siblings kidnapped by their grandparents and taken to San Jose, California, where they lived under aliases until they were identified in 2009. Maple's wife faced no charges because she had already died in 2007, but he was extradited to Tennessee and sentenced to four years probation. The grandchildren refused to reunite with their parents.
Lisa Kay Kelly	Billy Edwin Reid	Denver, Colorado	March 24, 1989	2008	Prostitute who was murdered and remained unidentified for 17 years before her identity was uncovered. Fingerprints found on her body matched to Lannell Williams (see below), and were eventually matched to drifter Billy Edwin Reid in 2006. Two years later, he was found guilty of both murders and sentenced to life imprisonment.
Renee Baker	Scott Erskine	Palm Beach, Florida, US	June 23, 1989	August 2004	A 26-year-old woman who was raped, had her neck snapped, and was left to drown with the tide. Erskine, already on death row for two other murders, pleaded guilty after a DNA match was made in 2003.
Lannell Williams	Billy Edwin Reid	Denver, Colorado	October 14, 1989	2008	Prostitute who was murdered and found in a humiliating position. Fingerprints found on her body matched to Lisa Kay Kelly (see above), and were eventually matched to drifter Billy Edwin Reid in 2006. Two years later, he was found guilty of both murders and sentenced to life imprisonment.
Jacob Wetterling	Danny Heinrich	Saint Joseph, Minnesota, US	October 22, 1989	September 1, 2016	An 11-year-old boy who was abducted while he biked home with his younger brother and a friend. Heinrich, who had been a person of interest in the case for a long time, confessed to having raped and murdered Wetterling only after he was arrested for possession of child pornography decades later. Heinrich also led police to Wetterling's remains as part of a plea deal.
Tsutsumi, Satoko and Tatsuhiko Sakamoto	Shoko Asahara, Kazuaki Okazaki, Tomomasa Nakagawa, Satoro Hashimoto	Yokohama, Kanagawa, Japan	November 4, 1989	July 25, 2000	Sakamoto was a 33-year-old lawyer working on a class action lawsuit against Aum Shinrikyo cult, his 29-year-old wife and 14-month-old son – all were murdered in their home by members of the cult. Their bodies were buried in metal drums in different rural areas of Niigata, Toyama and Nagano, where they remained unnoticed until members of the cult confessed and led police to the sites in the aftermath of the 1995 Tokyo subway sarin gas attack. The cult's leader, Asahara, was also convicted as the instigator of the murders, while a fourth material participant, Hideo Murai, was murdered before the trial.
Lisa Story and Robin Cornell	Joseph Zieler	Cape Coral, Florida, US	May 10, 1990	September 28, 2016	At an apartment in Cape Coral, 11-year-old Robin Cornell and her 32-year-old babysitter Lisa Story were both raped and murdered by a intruder. The killer, Joseph Zieler, was not caught until 26 years later, when he was linked to the case via DNA testing while under remand for an unrelated assault charge. Zieler was found guilty of two counts of first-degree murder and sentenced to death in 2023.
Linda Yalem	Altemio Sanchez	Amherst, New York, US	September 29, 1990	August 15, 2007	A college student who was raped and killed while training for the New York City Marathon. Sanchez was identified as the perpetrator during the revision of the case against Anthony Capozzi, who was wrongfully imprisoned for 21 years for two rapes committed with the same modus operandi.
Dolores E. Davis	Dennis Rader	Wichita, Kansas, US	January 19, 1991	August 18, 2005	See above.
Pamela Rose Aldridge McCall	Clark Perry Baldwin	Spring Hill, Tennessee, US	March 10, 1991	May 2, 2025	At the time of her death, McCall was five months pregnant. She was raped and strangled by Baldwin, a long-haul trucker, who was linked to her murder and those of two other women (see below) in 2020. He was convicted and sentenced to life imprisonment in this case, but died before standing trial for the other two.
Jessica Keen	Marvin Lee Smith, Jr.	West Jefferson, Ohio, US	March 16, 1991	March 2009	A 15-year-old girl from Columbus who was abducted from a home for troubled teens and raped. At one point, Keen escaped and tried to hide in Foster Chapel Cemetery, but her abductor found her and beat her to death with a headstone. Police suspected of her 18-year-old boyfriend, but he was ruled out by DNA. The same evidence later led them to Smith, who confessed and pleaded guilty in exchange for not facing the death penalty.
Timothy Wiltsey	Michelle Lodzinski	South Amboy, New Jersey, US	May 25, 1991	May 18, 2016	A five-year-old boy reported missing by his mother, Lodzinski, at a carnival on National Missing Children's Day. Lodzinski became a suspect when she told contradictory versions about how her son went missing, and she was arrested after Wiltsey's babysitters recognized the blanket found wrapped around Wiltsey's body as coming from Lodzinski's house.
Jaycee Dugard	Phillip and Nancy Garrido	South Lake Tahoe, California, US	June 10, 1991	June 2, 2011	An 11-year-old girl abducted from the street and kept in captivity for two decades, during which she was raped and had two daughters with her captor. The Garridos were arrested after Phillip took the daughters to a Berkeley campus and arouse suspicions because, as a convicted sex offender, he was not allowed to be near children.
Ariane Mazijn, Lutgarda Bogaerts, Maria Van den Reeck and Eve Poppe	Stephaan Du Lion	Antwerp and Oelegem, Belgium	1992–1997	15 February 2023	Four women who were raped and murdered by window cleaner Stephaan Du Lion. Their murders were at first considered unrelated, and were unsolved until October 2018, when Du Lion was linked via DNA to the Mazijn murder. He then confessed to the other three murders. Due to the overwhelming evidence against him, he was convicted of all four and sentenced to life imprisonment.
Shauna Howe	James and Timothy O'Brien, Elfred "Ted" Walker	Oil City, Pennsylvania, US	October 1992	October 2006	An 11-year-old girl abducted while coming home from a Girl Scouts Halloween party, raped, and subsequently killed when she was thrown from a railroad bridge. The perpetrators were identified after a DNA match was made to O'Brien, who was serving a prison sentence for another attempted kidnapping in 1995.
Majane Mazur	Altemio Sanchez	Buffalo, New York, US	November 1992	August 15, 2007	A prostitute victim of Sanchez. See above.
Beverly Bonner	John Edward Robinson	Raymore, Missouri, US	1993	October 2003	The 49-year-old prison librarian at Western Missouri Correctional Facility, where Robinson was imprisoned for fraud between 1987 and 1993. Upon his release, Bonner left her husband for Robinson and promptly disappeared, while Robinson continued to cash in her alimony checks. In 2000, her body was discovered in a metal drum stored in a garage rented by Robinson.
Richard and Lynn Ehlenfeldt, Guadalupe Maldonado, Michael C. Castro, Rico L. Solis, Thomas Mennes, Marcus Nellsen	Juan Luna	Palatine, Illinois, US	January 8, 1993	May 10, 2007	The two owners and five employees of a Brown's Chicken & Pasta, all killed during a robbery and stashed in the walk-in freezer. Luna, a former employee, and Degorski, whom he had met in high school, became suspects when Degorski's girlfriend denounced them in March 2002. Luna confessed after he was matched to DNA recovered from a half-eaten chicken in the freezer.
Richard and Lynn Ehlenfeldt, Guadalupe Maldonado, Michael C. Castro, Rico L. Solis, Thomas Mennes, Marcus Nellsen	James Degorski	Palatine, Illinois, US	January 8, 1993	September 29, 2009	The two owners and five employees of a Brown's Chicken & Pasta, all killed during a robbery and stashed in the walk-in freezer. Luna, a former employee, and Degorski, whom he had met in high school, became suspects when Degorski's girlfriend denounced them in March 2002. Luna confessed after he was matched to DNA recovered from a half-eaten chicken in the freezer.
Jennifer Renee Odom	Jeffrey Norman Crum	Dade City, Florida, US	February 19, 1993	August 20, 2026	On February 19, 1993, 12-year-old Jennifer Renee Odom was last seen alighting her school bus about 200 yards away from her house. Odom disappeared for six days before her body was found in Hernando County, and investigations revealed she had been raped and beaten before her death. The perpetrator, Jeffrey Crum, was identified through DNA testing in 2023, and he was convicted of first-degree murder on August 20, 2026.
Charlie Keever, Jonathan Sellers	Scott Erskine	San Diego County, California, US	March 27, 1993	September 1, 2004	Two boys, one 13 and another 9 years-old, who disappeared during a bike ride and were later found murdered. Sellers, who was African–American, was hanged on a tree, while Keever was raped and sexually mutilated. In March 2001, DNA retrieved from Keever's mouth was matched to Erskine, who was imprisoned for a rape committed six months after the murders.
Ángel Ibáñez, Sara Dotor	Gustavo Romero Tercero	Valdepeñas, Castilla-La Mancha, Spain	June 18, 1993	April 22, 2005	A young couple abducted from a public park, robbed and murdered (the woman was also raped). Romero, who fled to the Canary Islands shortly after the murder, was identified as the culprit when he was arrested for domestic violence in 2003 and his DNA was matched to that found at the scene. He confessed and led investigators to the place where he had thrown the murder weapon.
Mia Zapata	Jesús Mezquía	Seattle, Washington, US	July 7, 1993	2004	Lead singer of the punk band The Gits, who was raped and murdered while coming home from a music venue. A DNA match was made to Mezquía after he was arrested for burglary and domestic violence in Florida in 2002. Mezquía had been reported for indecent exposure in Seattle within two weeks of Zapata's murder.
Chekannur Maulavi	V. V. Hamsa	Edappal, Kerala, India	July 29, 1993	September 30, 2010	Progressive Islamic cleric abducted from his home by members of A.P. Aboobacker Musalyar's ultraorthodox Muslim sect. Hamsa was the only convicted of ten people charged.
Rita Tangredi	John Bittrolff	Suffolk County, New York, US	November 2, 1993	September 12, 2017	Two prostitutes killed while working. Bittrolff became a suspect when his brother Timothy was arrested for an unrelated charge and he was partially matched to DNA found on the victims. Subsequently, Bittrolff provided a full match. Bittrolff is also a suspect in the murder of a third woman, Sandra Costilla, who was found dead in North Sea, New York on November 20, 1993, and in at least one of the murders attributed to the unidentified Long Island Serial Killer.
Colleen McNamee	John Bittrolff	Suffolk County, New York, US	January 30, 1994	September 12, 2017	Two prostitutes killed while working. Bittrolff became a suspect when his brother Timothy was arrested for an unrelated charge and he was partially matched to DNA found on the victims. Subsequently, Bittrolff provided a full match. Bittrolff is also a suspect in the murder of a third woman, Sandra Costilla, who was found dead in North Sea, New York on November 20, 1993, and in at least one of the murders attributed to the unidentified Long Island Serial Killer.
Sheila and Debbie Faith	John Edward Robinson	Raymore, Missouri, US	1994	October 2003	A 45-year-old woman and her 15-year-old daughter, who used a wheelchair due to spina bifida, from Fullerton, California. The Faiths moved to the Kansas City area after Sheila met Robinson through the internet and he offered her a job and to pay for Debbie's medical expenses. Afterward, Robinson cashed in Debbie's pension checks for seven years. Their remains were found at the same garage as Bonner's, also in metal drums.
Kiyoshi Kariya	Makoto Hirata	Tokyo, Kantō, Japan	February 1995	March 7, 2014	A 68-year-old lawyer who was kidnapped, fatally tortured and subsequently incinerated by Aum Shinrikyo, who wanted to learn the whereabouts of Kariya's sister after she defected from the cult. Hirata surrendered to authorities in 2011 and confessed to the abduction, but not to the murder which remains unsolved.
Hiromi Shimada	Makoto Hirata	Tokyo, Kantō, Japan	March 19, 1995	March 7, 2014	A college professor who was the target of a false flag bombing by Aum (Shimada was considered sympathetic to Aum, and the attack intended to deviate attention from the coming subway attacks), but he was unharmed. Hirata was convicted for the bombing despite denying any role in it.
Julie Ann Woodley, Sharlene Fowler and Tamara Hernandez	Jose Guerrero	Madera, California, US	April 23, 1995 – November 22, 1998	March 2009	Three women who were raped and murdered after meeting with a then-unknown man on C Street in Madera. DNA obtained at the crime scenes were later matched to Jose Guerrero in 2006, who was convicted and sentenced to death three years later.
Kiplyn Davis	Timmy Brent Olsen	Spanish Fork, Utah, US	May 2, 1995	February 11, 2011	A 15-year-old girl who was last seen at high school. Olsen pleaded guilty to her manslaughter, although he claims he only helped the real killer bury the body, and refuses to name the killer or the place of burial.
Wendie Prescott	Dale Scheanette	Arlington, Texas, US	December 24, 1996	September 5, 2000	22-year-old Wendie Rochelle Prescott, a teacher's aide, was attacked, raped and strangled to death by a serial rapist named Dale Scheanette. The case remained unsolved for four years before the arrest of Scheanette, whose DNA and fingerprints were matched to the ones found at the crime scene. Scheanette was found guilty of capital murder and sentenced to death and executed in 2009.
Tanya Nicole Kach	Thomas Hose	McKeesport, Pennsylvania, US	February 1996	2007	A 16-year-old runaway who was held in captivity by a security guard who worked at her school, until she escaped.
Robert Wykel	Myron Wynn	Yelm, Washington, US	February 26, 1996	2010	A 65-year-old man who disappeared after accompanying Wynn to buy a car. The main break in the case came years later when Wynn, a career con man with no known job, sold a pendant with a large diamond to his aunt that was identical to one that Wykel always wore on a ring, even when he restored cars. Microscopic examination of the diamond found marks consistent with the activity of Wykel, which together with its identical size and cut constituted proof that it was indeed the same diamond.
Janet Levine March	Perry and Arthur March	Forest Hills, Tennessee, US	August 15, 1996	2006	A 33-year-old woman who supposedly abandoned her family after she had an argument with her husband, Perry March. Her car, with all the items she took and her hairs in the trunk, was found in a parking lot with signs of not having been moved in several days. After a long legal battle with Janet's parents during which March was found liable for her wrongful death, had that conviction overturned, and fled with the children briefly to Mexico, Perry's father, Arthur, confessed that he had dug up and burned her remains, years after his son murdered her.
Juli Busken	Anthony Castillo Sanchez	Norman, Oklahoma, US	December 20, 1996	July 23, 2004	A University of Oklahoma dance student who was kidnapped, raped and killed by a gunman. Eight years later, in 2004, while in police custody for burglary, Sanchez was identified as the perpetrator after his DNA was matched to the samples collected in the Busken case. Sanchez was found guilty of the murder and sentenced to death and executed in 2023.
Delimar Vera	Carolyn Correa	Philadelphia, Pennsylvania, US	December 15, 1997	2005	An infant girl who disappeared during a house fire. The fire was ruled accidental and the body was assumed to have been completely destroyed by fire, although her mother, Luz Cuevas, was convinced that she had been abducted. Six years later, Cuevas met Vera at a birthday party and immediately suspected due to the strong resemblance between her and the girl. A DNA test proved that she was indeed her daughter. The abductor and arsonist was a friend of a distant relative of Vera's father.
Rui Pedro Teixeira Mendonça	Afonso Dias	Lousada, Norte Region, Portugal	March 4, 1998	October 3, 2014	An 11-year-old boy who disappeared after his mother forbid him from seeing his 22-year-old friend, Afonso Dias. Dias was thoroughly investigated as a suspect but he could only be convicted of corruption of a minor after a prostitute testified in 2011 that he had attempted to hire her to have sex with Teixeira, against Teixeira's will, in the day he disappeared.
Rosana Maroto	Gustavo Romero Tercero	Valdepeñas, Castilla–La Mancha, Spain	June 25, 1998	April 22, 2005	A 21-year-old woman who disappeared while cycling on a rural road; only her backpack, smeared with her vomit and a man's blood, was found in the area, while her bicycle was found in a well two years later. When DNA identified Romero as the source of the blood, he confessed to the murder and led investigators to an empty well where he had thrown the body.
Nicky Verstappen	Jos Brech	Landgraaf, Netherlands	August 10, 1998	November 20, 2020	On the morning of 10 August 1998, 11-year-old Nicky Verstappen disappeared from a summer camp he was attending in Brunssum, Limburg. His body was found on the evening of 11 August, 1.2 kilometres (0.75 mi) away in Landgraaf, and a murder investigation was subsequently launched. Despite extensive investigation, the case remained unsolved for over twenty years.
Danny, Kathy and Ashley Freeman, Lauria Bible	Ronnie Busick, Phil Welch, David Pennington	Welch, Oklahoma, US	December 29, 1999 – December 30, 1999	April 26, 2018	Married couple Danny and Kathy were murdered in their home, later set on fire, while their teenage daughter (Ashley) and her friend (Lauria) disappeared. Lauria's car and keys were at the scene, evidence that she had been there before vanishing. Two decades later, it was announced that Busick and his friends Welch (d. 2007) and Pennington (d. 2015) had bragged repeatedly about murdering the Freemans over drug debts, then taken the girls to a trailer home, where they raped and murdered before disposing of the bodies in a mineshaft. Busick was charged in 2018 with four counts of murder, two counts of kidnapping and arson but plead guilty in 2020 to accessory to first degree murder and was sentenced to 10 years in prison.
Nancy Carol Alvis and Patricia Cook Thornton	Thomas Maupin	Memphis, Tennessee, US	October 2001	April 2021	Two prostitutes who were murdered by paroled murderer and rapist Thomas Maupin. He was linked to the murders in 2016, accepted a plea for voluntary manslaughter in 2021 and sentenced to 12 years imprisonment.
Soh San	Gunasegaran Ramasamy	Singapore	October 2, 2001	November 17, 2013	Soh San was robbed and killed inside a lift while on her way back home from work. The murder was left unsolved for 12 years until 2013, when 28-year-old Gunasegaran Ramasamy surrendered himself to the police and confessed to the murder out of guilt. Gunasegaran, who was 16 at the time of the offence, was originally charged with murder, but the prosecution eventually agreed to reduce the charge to robbery with hurt, and Gunasegaran was sentenced to ten years' imprisonment in 2017 after pleading guilty.
Princess Berthomieux, Valerie McCorvey, Janecia Peters	Grim Sleeper	Inglewood and Los Angeles, California, US	March 19, 2002 – January 1, 2007	August 10, 2016	Victims of Franklin's second spree, who was nicknamed "The Grim Sleeper" for the long period of inactivity between them. See above.
Michelle Knight, Amanda Berry, Gina DeJesus	Ariel Castro	Cleveland, Ohio, US	August 23, 2002 – April 2, 2004	August 1, 2013	Three young women abducted in successive years from the same street and held in captivity for ten years until Berry (who also had a daughter with her captor) escaped.
Shawn Hornbeck	Michael J. Devlin	Richwoods, Missouri, US	October 6, 2002	October 6, 2007 – December 21, 2007	An 11-year-old boy who disappeared while cycling to a friend's house. After four years with no leads, Hornbeck was found alive in Devlin's home, when police came to investigate the disappearance of another 13-year-old boy, Ben Ownby, who was also found alive there.
Scott Ponder, Brian Lucas, Chris Sherbert, Beverly Guy	Todd Kohlhepp	Chesnee, South Carolina, US	November 6, 2003	May 26, 2017	The owner and employees of a motorcycle shop, all shot for no apparent reason. Kohlhepp confessed to the murders after he was arrested for an unrelated double kidnapping and murder in 2016.
Daniel Morcombe	Brett Peter Cowan	Sunshine Coast, Queensland, Australia	December 7, 2003	March 13, 2014	A 13-year-old boy abducted from a bus stop after the bus failed to stop and let him in. The case was revived in 2011 after police placed a clay model of a suspicious man seen in the same road at the time Morcombe disappeared and called possible witnesses to come forward; this resulted in both Cowan and his white Mitsubishi Pajero being placed in the scene of the crime. Morcombe's remains were found in the Glass House Mountains a week after Cowan's arrest.
Karlie Pearce-Stevenson and Khandalyce Pearce	Daniel James Holdom	Alice Springs, Northern Territory, Australia	November 8, 2008	November 30, 2018	A mother and daughter who disappeared together. Their remains were found years later and hundreds of miles apart in Belanglo State Forest, New South Wales, and Wynarka, South Australia, and not as related to one another until their DNA was matched in 2015. Their family reported them missing in 2009, but subsequently withdrew the notice when Holdom's new romantic partner impersonated Pearce-Stevenson and used her phone and Facebook to make it look like they were still alive.
Georgann Smith	Delmer Smith	Sarasota County, Florida, US	April 5, 2009	June 22, 2019	A 36-year-old woman who was attacked, raped and beaten to death by a male intruder inside her home in April 2009. The killer, Delmer Smith (unrelated to the victim), was identified through DNA testing in 2017, and was later sentenced to life imprisonment for second-degree murder in 2019.
Morgan Harrington	Jesse LeRoy Matthew, Jr.	Charlottesville, Virginia, US	October 17, 2009	2016	A 20-year-old college student who disappeared while attending a Metallica concert and was found murdered three months later. Forensic evidence identified the culprit as the same perpetrator of the murder of Hannah Graham in 2014, who was in turn identified as Matthew due to him being recorded by CCTV with Graham before her murder. Matthew pleaded guilty to both murders and all other related charges in 2016.

== Examples without conviction, but considered solved or likely solved ==
Victim(s)	Suspect	Location	Crime date	Breakthrough date	Description
José María Grimaldos López	Himself	Osa de la Vega, New Castile, Spain	August 20, 1910	July 10, 1926	A 28-year-old shepherd from nearby Tresjuncos who disappeared after an animal sale. Grimaldos's family accused two wardens from Osa who had bullied Grimaldos previously, and they confessed to the crime after being brutally tortured. In 1918, the accused were sentenced to 18 years in prison for the murder, but they were paroled in 1925. The next year, Grimaldos was discovered to have been living in Mira for the past 16 years, when he surprisingly traveled to Tresjuncos to request his birth certificate. The previous conviction was overturned and the convicted compensated.
Joseph Henry Loveless AKA Walter Cairns	Unknown. Likely a vigilante group.	Buffalo Cave, Dubois, Idaho, US	May 1916	December 30, 2019	Joseph Henry Loveless was a 46-year-old habitual criminal living under the alias Walter Cairns. He disappeared after escaping from the county jail in 1916, where he had been charged with killing his wife with an axe. His dismembered remains, minus his head, were discovered buried in a shallow grave deep in an Idaho cave system in 1979 and 1991. He remained unidentified until the end of 2019. The identification, confirmed by the Clark County Sheriff's Office, was initially made by non-profit volunteer organization DNA Doe Project using genetic fingerprinting. Clothes found with the remains matched the description of those Loveless was wearing when he made his escape.
Marietje "Ria" Pagie	Theodorus van Berkel	Tilburg, North Brabant, Netherlands	15 August 1941	1975	Pagie, 10, disappeared after leaving her parents' home. While it was initially unclear what might have happened to her, her decomposing body was found on 25 October on a private estate near Berkel-Enschot. By that time, police had identified a suspect in her murder: Theodorus van Berkel, her older sister's one-time boyfriend, who was arrested for a different murder and had prior convictions for sex crimes in the United States. While Van Berkel was never tried for this murder, he was generally accepted as the killer and confessed to the killing to a private investigator in 1975, when he was serving time for a third murder. However, he was not charged due to the statute of limitations having passed.
Lucy Ann Johnson	Herself	Surrey, British Columbia, Canada	September 1961	July 2013	Johnson was reported missing by her husband on May 14, 1965, years after she was seen by anyone else. For decades, she was listed as a missing person and her husband was investigated as a suspect even after he died in the 1990s. In 2013, Johnson was found alive in Whitehorse, Yukon, where she had remarried and had other children. She claimed she abandoned her first family because her husband was physically abusive.
Mary Sullivan	Albert DeSalvo	Boston, Massachusetts, US	January 4, 1964	July 2013	Last victim attributed to the Boston Strangler, who was raped and strangled with two scarves in her home. While DeSalvo confessed to being the Strangler, he was tried for several unrelated rapes only and was sentenced to life in prison, where he was murdered in 1973. Forty years later, his body was exhumed and his DNA matched to semen found at the crime scene. Doubts remain about DeSalvo's relation to the other Strangler murders.
Diane McDermott	John Sponza	Waterbury, Connecticut, US	February 9, 1967	2012	A 21-year-old woman shot with the gun of her live-in boyfriend, Sponza, who had ties to organized crime. The death was ruled an accident resulting from McDermott picking up the gun while Sponza was cleaning it. However, the case was reinvestigated decades later at the request of McDermott's son, actor Dylan McDermott, and ruled a homicide by Sponza. Sponza was himself murdered in 1972 and his murder remains unsolved.
Louisa Dunne	Ryland Headley	Bristol, UK	28 June 1967	30 June 2025	On June 28, 1967, 75-year-old Louisa Dunne was found raped and dead at her home on Britannia Road in Easton. Avon and Somerset Police began reviewing the case in 2023. Modern forensic examination was not available at the time of Louisa's death, but police obtained a full DNA profile and fingerprint. The DNA profile was compared to the national database and matched to that of Ryland Headley, who was placed into the system in 2012 following an unrelated incident.
Andrew Lee Muns	Michael LeBrun	Subic Bay, Philippines	1968	1998	Ensign serving aboard the fleet oiler USS Cacapon during the Vietnam War, who disappeared along with $8,600 from the ship's safe. Muns was officially listed as a thief and a deserter until the NCIS started an investigation at the request of Muns's family, 30 years later. LeBrun, who also worked at the reimbursing office at the time, confessed to being the real thief, to have murdered Muns when he confronted him over it, and to have disposed of the body in one of the ship's tankers. However, he recanted later and the confession was considered not admissible before the court. Nevertheless, Muns was officially cleared and given a burial with military honors at Arlington National Cemetery.
Reyna Angélica Marroquín	Howard B. Elkins	Jericho, New York, US	1969	1999	A 28-year-old Salvadoran immigrant who was having an extra-marital affair with Elkins when she disappeared, and was never reported missing. In 1999, Marroquín's mummified body was found in a barrel at Elkins's previous home, which he had sold in 1972. She was pregnant at the time of her death, and a DNA test of the fetus identified Elkins as the father. Elkins committed suicide the day after he was interrogated by detectives about the murder.
Betty Jo Richards	Jack Trawick	Quinton, Alabama, US	July 16, 1972	1992	Richards was stabbed to death in an alley, with witnesses at the time reporting that she was last seen screaming while running away from an unknown white man. Initially, police detained a man named Thomas Barnett for the crime, but he was ultimately let go. More than twenty years later, serial killer Jack Trawick confessed to killing Richards, providing information that only the killer could have known. He was not charged with the murder, and was later executed for an unrelated murder in 2009.
Siobhan McGuinness	Richard William Davis	Turah, Montana, US	February 4, 1974	October 26, 2020	The 5-year-old McGuinness was abducted from her home in Missoula, after which she was raped, stabbed, and beaten to death on a highway near Turah. There was no notable progress on the case until 2018, when genetic genealogy company Othram was contacted to test DNA isolated from McGuinness' body. This was used to identify her killer as Richard William Davis, who died of natural causes in 2012.
Arlis Perry	Stephen Blake Crawford	Stanford, California, US	October 12, 1974	June 28, 2018	A 19-year-old newlywed who was sodomized with a candlestick and murdered while praying at Stanford Memorial Church in Stanford University. Crawford, the security guard who found the body, was identified as the culprit after a DNA test was performed on semen found at the scene. The same evidence had earlier excluded Crawford after being tested with more primitive technology. Crawford shot himself when police arrived at his residence with a search warrant.
Suzanne Marie Sevakis	Franklin Delano Floyd	North Carolina, US	1975	October 2014	A young girl kidnapped by Floyd, her stepfather, while her mother was serving a month sentence in prison. Floyd subsequently raised and married Sevakis under different aliases. Sevakis, then known as "Sharon Marshall", died in a suspicious hit and run in 1990 and her real identity remained a mystery until 2014. In 1995, several photographs depicting Sevakis being sexually abused were found in a truck stolen and abandoned shortly after by Floyd. She could be as young as four years old in some images.
Allenstown Four	Terry Peder Rasmussen	Allenstown, New Hampshire, US	1978–1984	2017	A woman and three young girls, whose bodies were found inside two steel barrels abandoned in Bear Brook State Park. The woman and two of the girls were maternally related, and the third girl, aged 4, was identified as Rasmussen's biological daughter in 2017. Rasmussen had worked for the owner of the property between 1977 and 1981, using the alias "Robert Evans". He died in prison in 2010, while serving a sentence for murdering his wife in 2002.
Denise and Dawn Beaudin	Terry Peder Rasmussen	Manchester, New Hampshire, US	October 12, 1981	July 2016	A woman, Denise, and her six-month-old daughter, Dawn, who disappeared with Rasmussen. The daughter was abandoned by Rasmussen in Scotts Valley, California in 1986, after raising her alone for some time, and also neglecting and molesting her. Dawn discovered her real identity through genealogy websites when she was 35. Denise Beaudin was excluded as the adult victim at Allenstown and her whereabouts are unknown, but she is presumed murdered by Rasmussen.
Brenda Gerow	John "Jack" Kalhauser	Tucson, Arizona, US	c. April 6, 1981	April 2015	A 20-year-old woman last seen alive when she left her family home in the company of Kalhauser, her boyfriend, in 1980. Her body was discovered in Arizona in 1981 and remained unidentified for 34 years, during which she was known as the "Pima County Jane Doe". In 1995, a photograph of Gerow while she was still alive surfaced in the possession of Kalhauser, who was pending trial for the murder of his wife, Diane Van Reeth. Police announced that they believed the photograph to be connected to the unidentified decedent in 2014 and confirmed this when they matched the body's DNA to Gerow's family.
Adam Walsh	Ottis Toole	Hollywood, Florida, US	July 27, 1981	December 16, 2008	A six-year-old boy abducted from a department store; only his head, severed post-mortem, was found two weeks later. Though Toole confessed to the murder already in 1983, the fact that he and his sometimes associate Henry Lee Lucas made false confessions to several other murders cast doubt on his testimony, and he eventually recanted. The prosecution was further complicated when police lost Toole's car and a machete before proper testing could be done. Nevertheless, the police and Walsh's family made a joint announcement in 2008 about their confidence in Toole's guilt based on circumstantial evidence. The investigation of Walsh's murder was then officially closed. Among the evidence was Toole's niece's claim that he had again confessed the murder and decapitation of Walsh while on his deathbed in 1996, seemingly unprompted.
Tina Harmon	Robert Anthony Buell	Lodi, Ohio, US	October 29, 1981	2010	A 12-year-old girl who was abducted, raped and murdered. A man was convicted for her murder in 1982 but released after winning a retrial in 1983. In 2010, DNA found at the murder scene was matched to Buell, who had been executed in 2002 for the 1982 murder of Krista Harrison. Further matches were made between fibers found on Harmon and Harrison's bodies, and between dog hair found on Harmon and a dog buried in Buell's yard.
Tina Lade, Sarah Link and Justin Hook Jr.	Andrew Six	Ottumwa, Iowa, US	April 12, 1984	January 2014	The three victims were murdered by Six, who allegedly had a dispute with one of the victims over a vehicle purchase prior to the murders. Six was posthumously identified as the murder in 2014, 17 years after his 1997 execution for the 1987 kidnapping and murder of 12-year-old Kathy Allen.
Lisa Stasi	John Edward Robinson	Overland Park, Kansas, US	January 9, 1985	October 2002	The mother of Tiffany Stasi. See above
Wanda Jean Mays	Herself	Georgia Mountain, Alabama, US	May 12, 1986	2008	A 26-year-old woman, prone to panic attacks, who disappeared while sleeping in her aunt and uncle's country home. Her room's door was locked and her blood was found in a window, which had been broken from the inside; her gown, which was found discarded on a boat dock; and on a canoe found adrift on Guntersville Lake. Her bones were found at the bottom of a cliff by a ginseng hunter in 2003 and identified by the FBI five years later. Because of the lack of foul play evidence, the death was ruled accidental.
Hashimoto (first name unknown)	Miyoko Sumida	Amagasaki, Hyōgo, Japan	1987	November 2011	Believed to be the first victim of the Amagasaki Serial Murder Incident discovered in 2011. The victim, the mother of later victim Jiro Hashimoto, disappeared when she and Sumida were in their 30s. The case is not under investigation because the Japanese statute of limitations had already run out when it was tied to Sumida.
Olga Sazonova	Vladimir Kolpakov	Ulyanovsk, Ulyanovsk Oblast, Russia	March 16, 1987	2022	11-year-old girl who was abducted and sexually abused for multiple days by her neighbor, who then strangled her and dismembered her remains. Despite its high-profile status and the erroneous arrest of another man, the case remained unsolved until the summer of 2022, when DNA obtained from semen stains linked Sazonova's neighbor, Vladimir Kolpakov, to the crime. Before he could be arrested, however, he committed suicide.
Sherry Perisho	Charlie Brandt	Big Pine Key, Florida, US	July 16, 1989	May 6, 2006	A homeless woman whose body was found floating on a canal, after being nearly decapitated and having her heart extracted. The dinghy she lived in was found inland and with signs of having been used as a cutting board. Brandt, who committed suicide after murdering his wife and niece on September 13, 2004, was officially named as the perpetrator of Perisho's murder in 2006. He lived 1,000 feet from the murder scene, strongly resembled a composite sketch of a man seen fleeing the scene, was seen with bloody clothes in his home after the murder, and performed a nearly identical mutilation on his niece's body.
Beverly McGowan	Elaine Parent	Pompano Beach, Florida, US	July 17, 1990	April 2002	A 34-year-old bank clerk murdered by a con artist who pretended to answer an ad for a room to rob her and steal her identity. Her body was found two days later in a canal, missing her head, hands and a tattoo on her stomach, but she could be identified from a smaller tattoo on her ankle. Years later, Police were able to determine Parent's identity and locate her in a Panama City, Florida apartment, but she shot herself before they could arrest her.
Anjelica Castillo	Conrado Juarez	New York City, New York, US	c. July 18, 1991	2013	A four-year-old daughter of Mexican illegal immigrants who was not reported missing and remained unidentified for 22 years, during which she was nicknamed "Baby Doe." Her mother believed that she had been taken to Mexico by her father, but he actually left her in the care of adult cousins Balvina and Conrado Juarez in Astoria, Queens. After her identification in 2013, Conrado confessed to having raped, tortured and murdered the child, then disposed of the body with the help of Balvina, who died before the identification.
Irene Vasquez	Clark Perry Baldwin	Rock Springs, Wyoming, US	October 1991 – February 1992	May 6, 2020	See above.
Cindi Arleen Estrada	Clark Perry Baldwin	Sheridan County, Wyoming, US	April 1992	May 6, 2020	See above.
Katya Dmitrieva	Shavkat Shayakhmedov	Istiqlol, Sughd Region, Tajikistan	May 21, 1994	July 2023	An 8-year-old girl who disappeared seemingly without a trace, and despite a large search being organized to find her, Dmitrieva's fate remained unknown. In early 2023, an Uzbekistani-Russian national and her former neighbor, Shavkat Shayakhmedov, was arrested for several murders he committed in Russia. Following his conviction for these crimes, he confessed to the murder of Dmitrieva, claiming that he lured her to his house, raped her, and encased her body in his mother-in-law's home. The house was searched and human remains were located, which were later confirmed to be Dmitrieva's. Shayakhmedov was never charged with the case, as he died less than a month after confessing.
Murder of Nicole Brown Simpson and Ronald Goldman	O. J. Simpson	Brentwood, Los Angeles, United States	June 12, 1994	October 3, 1995	Nicole Brown Simpson and Ronald Goldman, were both stabbed to death at the front of her home. Brown Simpson's ex-husband O. J. Simpson, who lived a few minutes drive away, was found not guilty and acquitted of the double murder at trial in 1995. Forensic evidence of the blood found was considered conclusive and there were no other serious suspects. Simpson was found liable in a civil tort in 1997.
Shawn Marie Neal	Ronald Lee Moore	North Myrtle Beach, South Carolina, US	June 2, 1996	February 2020	A 23-year-old escort who was strangled to death and hanged in a condominium. DNA testing linked Moore to the crime, however, he had committed suicide in 2008. He had previously been linked to another unsolved murder.
Egbert Rimkus, Georg Weber, Cornelia and Max Meyer	None	Death Valley National Park, California, US	July 23, 1996	November 12, 2009	Four German tourists who disappeared hiking in the area. A search at the time proved fruitless, but 13 years later, the remains of Egbert and Cornelia were found by hikers. Though no remains of Georg and Max were found, the four are presumed to have died of dehydration after getting lost in the desert.
Christine Vu	Dale Scheanette	Arlington, Texas, US	September 17, 1996	September 5, 2000	25-year-old Christine Huyen Vu, a teacher, was attacked, raped and strangled to death by a serial rapist named Dale Scheanette. The case remained unsolved for four years before the arrest of Scheanette, whose DNA and fingerprints were matched to the ones found at the crime scene. Scheanette was charged with murdering Vu, but he was found guilty of killing another victim named Wendie Prescott in a separate case and received a death sentence, and ultimately put to death in 2009.
Eva Blanco	Ahmed Chelh Gerj	Algete, Madrid, Spain	April 20, 1997	October 1, 2015	A 16-year-old girl abducted on her way home after visiting a disco with friends, and subsequently raped and stabbed to death in a lover's lane, six kilometers away. For years, police centered their suspicions on Blanco's friends and relatives because she was assumed to have had consensual sex before she was murdered. However, a genealogical DNA test in 2013 revealed that the source of the semen was a man of North African extraction, who was later identified as Chelh, a Moroccan immigrant who had moved to France in 1999. Chelh was arrested and extradited in 2015, but he committed suicide while awaiting trial on January 29, 2016. The investigation was formally closed the following month.
Natascha Kampusch	Wolfgang Přiklopil	Vienna, Austria	March 2, 1998	August 23, 2006	A 10-year-old girl who was abducted on her way to school and held in captivity until she escaped, eight years later. Přiklopil jumped in front of a train when he learned of Kampusch's escape.
Annelise Hyang Suk Lee	Ronald Lee Moore	Owings Mills, Maryland, US	December 10, 1999	July 2014	A 27-year-old woman who was found dead in her apartment. Police later reexamined evidence from the case and Moore was identified as the killer, however, he had committed suicide in 2008. He was later linked to another unsolved murder.
Zebb Quinn	Robert Jason Owens	Asheville, North Carolina, US	January 2, 2000	July 10, 2017	An 18-year-old Walmart employee who disappeared after his daily shift, when he went to buy a car with Owens, a coworker. Owens was one of two primary suspects until 2015 when he was arrested for the unrelated murder of Cristie Schoen Codd and her husband. In 2017 he was convicted of the Codds murders and indicted for Quinn's murder; the reasons for the latter are undisclosed.
Chandra Levy	Ingmar Guandique	Washington, D.C., US	May 1, 2001	March 3, 2009	A Federal Bureau of Prisons intern who disappeared and was found murdered in Rock Creek Park over a year later. Police and media centered their attention on US Congressman Gary Condit, whom she had an extra-marital affair with, until eight years later when an investigation by The Washington Post led to Guandique, a Salvadoran illegal immigrant incarcerated for assaulting two other women in the same place around the time of Levy's murder. Guandique was convicted of the crime in 2011, but the conviction was overturned and a retrial was called in 2015 after it was determined that a witness at the first trial had committed perjury. On July 28, 2016, prosecutors announced that they would no longer seek charges against Guandique and instead worked to have him deported.
Joseph Curseen, Thomas Morris Jr., Ottilie Lundgren, Robert Stevens, Katherine Nguyen (plus 17 others injured)	Bruce Edwards Ivins	Boca Raton, Florida and Washington, D.C., US (also injured in New York City)	September 18, 2001 – October 9, 2001	August 6, 2008	Random people mailed letters infected with anthrax in the aftermath of the September 11 terrorist attacks. Early investigations focused on biological weapons expert Steven Hatfill but shifted to Ivins after the viral strain was identified as coming from his lab. Ivins committed suicide on July 21, 2008, when the FBI was about to lay charges on him, and he was named the official perpetrator a week later. The investigation was formally closed on February 19, 2010.
Takashi Tanimoto, Hisayoshi Sumida	Miyoko Sumida and her family	Hyōgo and Okinawa, Japan	2003–2005	November 2011	Victims in the Amagasaki Serial Murder Incident and relatives of Sumida, who may have killed them for insurance. Like in the other murders, Sumida admitted them after her arrest and produced a written chronicle of her crimes, then committed suicide while in police custody.
Tara Grinstead	Ryan Alexander Duke, Bo Dukes	Ocilla, Georgia, US	October 23, 2005	2017	A high school history teacher who vanished from her home. Though no body was found, Duke and Dukes (no relation), two former students at the high school, were respectively charged with murder and concealment.

== In popular culture ==
=== Film ===
- In the film Max Payne, Detective Max Payne works in Cold Case, NYPD.

=== Literature ===
The phrase "Cold Case" is found in a number of story and book titles. Examples include:

- L.L. Bartlett (2010). "Cold Case". A Jeff Resnick Mystery. ASIN B003I84LYW. Polaris Press. This short story inspired the fourth Jeff Resnick book, Bound by Suggestion.
- Philip Gourevitch (2002). A Cold Case. Macmillan. ISBN 978-0312420024. True crime.
- Julia Platt Leonard (2012). Cold Case. Aladdin. ISBN 978-1442420090. A children's book/mystery.
- Nichelle Walker (2012). Cold Case Love. NWHoodTales Publishing. ISBN 978-0979402838. An urban novel.
- Richard H. Walton, ed. (2006). Cold Case Homicides: Practical Investigative Techniques. CRC Press. ISBN 084932209X. An education and reference book.
- Stephen White (2001). Cold Case. Alan Gregory. ISBN 978-0525945260.
- Kate Wilhelm (2009). Cold Case. Barbara Holloway Novels. ISBN 978-0778326656.

=== Music ===
- Cold Case Files (2008) and Cold Case Files Vol. 2 (2012) are compilation albums by the rap group Onyx.
- "Cold Case Love" is a song on Rihanna's Rated R album, released November 23, 2009 on the Def Jam label.
- "Stella: The Cold Case" is an EP by Aafke Romeijn.

=== Television ===
- The Canadian television series Cold Squad (1998–2005), the British television series Waking the Dead (2000–2011) and the American television series Cold Case (2003–2010) all follow groups of fictional homicide detectives who investigate cold cases. They are set in Vancouver, London and Philadelphia, respectively.
- Cold Case Files (1999–2006) is a documentary-style television series recounting actual solved cold cases.
- New Tricks is a BBC series revolving around retired CID officers acting as consultants to serving officers and investigating unsolved cold cases.
- Unforgotten is a ITV, DCI Cassie Stuart (Nicola Walker) and DI Sunny Khan (Sanjeev Bhaskar), as they solve cold cases of disappearance and murder.

=== Video game ===
- Chase: Cold Case Investigations - Distant Memories is a video game about two detectives of the Tokyo Metropolitan Police Department's cold case unit, Shounosuke Nanase and Koto Amekura.
- Cold Case Inc is an online platform that publishes interactive, document-driven unsolved case file games.

== See also ==
- Body identification
- Crime clearance rate
- Error of impunity
- FBI Victims Identification Project
- Forensic engineering
- Forensic photography
- Forensic science
- Genealogical DNA test
- Operation Identify Me
