= Georgann =

Georgann is a given name. Notable people with the name include:

- Georgann Johnson, American actress
- Georgann Hawkins, American college student and murder victim of Ted Bundy
- Georgann Wells, also spelt Georgeann Wells, All-American basketball player
- Georgann Smith, American murder victim
