= Sheila Fox =

Sheila Fox may refer to:

- Disappearance of Sheila Fox (1944), an unsolved missing person case
- Disappearance of Sheila Fox (1972), a solved missing person case
