= Jose Guerrero =

José Guerrero may refer to:

== Sports ==
- José Guerrero (tennis), Spanish tennis player
- José Guerrero (baseball) (1926–2009), Mexican baseball player
- José Daniel Guerrero (born 1987), Mexican football (soccer) player
- José Félix Guerrero (born 1975), Spanish footballer
- José Paolo Guerrero (born 1984), Peruvian football (soccer) player
- José Guerrero (referee)
- José María Guerrero (footballer), Ecuadorian football (soccer) player

== Others ==
- José María Guerrero de Arcos (1799–1853), president of Honduras and (later) Nicaragua
- José Gustavo Guerrero (1876–1958), Salvadoran jurist, first president of the International Court of Justice
- José Guerrero (artist) (1914–1991), Spanish painter in the United States
- Jose Guerrero (serial killer), American serial killer
