= Mira Municipality =

Mira Municipality may refer to:

- Mira Municipality, Portugal
- Mira, Spain, a municipality in Cuenca Province
