= Stephaan Du Lion =

Belgian serial killer

- Born: 12 May 1964 (age 62); Antwerp, Belgium
- Other name: "Pitbull"
- Conviction: Murder x4
- Penalty: Life imprisonment

Details
- Victims: 4+
- Span of crimes: 1992–1997
- Country: Belgium
- State: Antwerp
- Date apprehended: October 2018

Stephaan Du Lion (born 12 May 1964) is a Belgian serial killer who raped and murdered at least four women in the Antwerp Province between 1992 and 1997, while working as a window cleaner. He was not linked to the crimes at the time, and the crimes remained unsolved for almost two decades.

Du Lion was finally exposed in 2017, after his DNA sample from a previous arrest for burglary linked him to the crime scenes. He was later tried, convicted, and sentenced to life imprisonment. This case garnered extensive media coverage both in the country and abroad, and is often cited as an example of why legislation about new investigative methods using DNA should be used in solving Belgian cold cases.

== Early life ==
Stephaan Du Lion was born on 12 May 1964 in Antwerp, the youngest child and only son in a family with three older sisters. His father was an ironworker and his mother was a cleaning lady. The family lived in Borgerhout, where they were regularly subjected to violent outbursts at the hands of Du Lion's father.

At age 13, Du Lion left school and started working as an apprentice at a coachbuilding company. While little is known about his teenage years, a childhood friend of Du Lion's would later give an interview with Het Laatste Nieuws in which he described his impressions of him. During the interview, the man – using the pseudonym "Walter" – stated that he met Du Lion while fishing at the Rivierenhof, and that the two grew close over their mutual interests. "Walter" claimed that Du Lion always appeared cold and emotionless, and almost never talked about his parents.

=== Sexual assaults ===
Throughout the 1980s, Du Lion is known to have attempted at least two sexual assaults. The more publicized of the two cases occurred on Mother's Day, 15 August 1985. At that time, Du Lion was at a park in Berchem, waiting for a suitable victim to attack. He then spotted 21-year-old post office clerk Linda Verhoeven, who was trying to track down her dog after it ran off and had a sprained foot. When she got close, Du Lion came up from behind and placed his hand over her mouth and dragged her over to some nearby train tracks intending to rape her.

Du Lion managed to tear off her sundress and took her off panties, but did not proceed further, as Verhoeven managed to feign interest in him and asked him to come to her place later that night. Convinced by her apparent offer, he carried her back to where he found her and then left. Later that night, he arrived at her apartment carrying a bouquet of flowers, where he was promptly arrested by police officers after Verhoeven identified him as her assailant.

Initially, Du Lion attempted to claim that at the time of the crime he was out buying shoes, but was confronted on his lies by the interviewing detective. After two days, he finally confessed to the assault and was charged. He was later successfully convicted, but was given a lenient sentence and released. Years later, after his arrest for the serial murders, Verhoeven gave an interview to the media about the attack and how it affected her personal life.

=== Life after release ===
Following his release from prison, Du Lion again started working as a window cleaner, travelling across different sections of Antwerp as part of his job. He also married and had a daughter, played darts at a local club, and enjoyed table football.

Unbeknownst to most of his acquaintances, Du Lion exhibited extremely misogynistic views, as he believed that the only thing women are useful for was sex. This was noticed in how he behaved towards his wife, whom he socially isolated from others, going so far as to order her to stay in another room of their house if he ever had guests. In his spare time, he kept to himself and fished at various spots around the city, mostly in the company of his two pet pitbulls.

At some point, he reconnected with his childhood friend "Walter", with whom he joined a motorcycle club in the late 1990s, which would later on be merged into a branch of the Blue Angels. While a member of this club, he earned the nickname "Pitbull" due to his appearance and his two pets. "Walter" claimed that around this time he noticed that Du Lion was always armed, carrying a knife and a hand axe on him at all times.

== Murders ==
=== Modus operandi ===
Between 1992 and 1997, Du Lion is known to have sexually assaulted and murdered at least four women in different districts of Antwerp. He used his profession as a window cleaner to gain access to their apartments, after which he would attack the victims.

=== Confessed murders ===
Du Lion committed his first known murder on 17 June 1992, when he rang on the door of 30-year-old Ariane Mazijn, ostensibly to ask for some water. When she opened, he made his way inside and proceeded to attack her. He then raped and strangled Mazijn with an electrical cord and stabbed her seven times in the chest and abdomen. Her body was later found by her boyfriend, 42-year-old Joël Le Tanter, who was considered the prime suspect in her murder up until Du Lion's arrest decades later. Le Tanter stated that he heard what sounded like a man sighing and sobbing in the stairwell just before finding his girlfriend's body, leading to speculation that this individual was Du Lion.

On 10 July 1993, Du Lion was waiting for a victim in Oelegem when he spotted 28-year-old Lutgarda Bogaerts cycling alone near the Duwvaart Canal. He then proceeded to rape her and strangled her with the bungee cord of her bicycle. When she failed to return home that evening, her friends organized a search party to find her – this proved difficult due to the fact that it was not known where exactly Bogaerts went cycling for the evening. Her partially undressed body was found days later. A witness acquainted with Bogaerts later came forward and said that he had briefly accompanied her on her ride, but was unable to provide any description of her killer.

On 24 November 1994, Du Lion got inside the Borgerhout apartment of 46-year-old Maria Van den Reeck, whom he sexually assaulted and strangled with the cord of a curling iron. Due to the fact that she kept to herself and had no apparent close acquaintances, Van den Reeck's body was found ten days later after her father requested a welfare check from the authorities. Some time after the murder, it was revealed that she was dating an African man who was questioned, but later ruled out as a suspect.

On either the 4th or 5 September 1997, Du Lion used a spare key hidden under a doormat to enter the Luchtbal apartment of 38-year-old Eve Poppe. He attacked her while she was in her bedroom, where he raped and strangled her with a cord before he proceeded to stab her twelve times in the chest. He then locked the doors and escaped through a window. That same day, a neighbour whom Poppe had helped out earlier decided to come over and thank her, but found that the apartment was locked and went back home. A couple of hours later, the neighbour became concerned after hearing Poppe's cat meowing for hours. Two days later, one of the neighbour's daughters went over to check on Poppe by peering in through the balcony. She did not see a body, but still called the police after noticing that the lights were still on and the TV was running. Officers managed to open the door and entered, where they found Poppe's body on the bed.

=== Tania Van Kerkhoven case ===
After his confessions became known to the public, various media outlets speculated on whether he was involved in other violent crimes. The most notable case he was considered a possible suspect in was the 17 July 1993 murder of 17-year-old Tania Van Kerkhoven, who was strangled and stabbed to death in Berchem. Unlike Du Lion's other victims, she was not raped.

Du Lion was never charged in this case, which remains unsolved. In 2025, it was linked to a two rapes that occurred in 1992 and 1993. The year after that, Van Kerkhoven's case was linked via DNA to the disappearances of Kim and Ken Heyrman. This revelation indicated that another serial offender was responsible for all three cases.

== Investigation and arrest ==
Shortly after Poppe's murder, investigators started investigating Du Lion as a possible suspect, as he was known to be in the vicinity due to his work as a window cleaner. However, he was not arrested due to a lack of evidence. After this crime, he is not conclusively known to have committed any violent offenses, leaving the four murders to be unsolved for many years.

In 2011, Du Lion was fired from his job. Reportedly, Du Lion considered this decision unfair and that the actual reason was because he was now in his 50s. This prompted him to attempt to rob his former boss' workplace to steal several items deemed necessary for somebody to work as a self-employed window cleaner, for which he was arrested. While he served no prison time for this offence, he was ordered to provide a DNA sample four years later after an amendment to the country's legislature mandated that people convicted of crimes such as burglaries need to give a sample of their DNA. Friends and acquaintances noted that Du Lion always appeared agitated and on edge after this, as if he feared that something bad would happen.

During this time, investigators decided to revisit the Mazijn case due to the advancement of forensic technology in the country. In October 2018, a sample of the semen left behind by the perpetrator was linked to Du Lion, who was arrested for the murder and put in a pre-trial detention center.

His second wife, whom he had married in 2017, then filed for a divorce.

=== Confessions ===
For almost a year, investigators worked on the case against Du Lion for the Mazijn murder. Around September 2019, the Antwerp Public Prosecutor's Office announced that his DNA was also matched to the murder of Poppe. At first, Du Lion pretended to be shocked by the accusation, but eventually relented and indicated that he wanted to talk with the investigators.

On 1 October, he confessed to the Poppe murder during an interrogation. However, to the surprise of the investigators, he also admitted responsibility for the murders of Bogaerts and Van den Reeck, describing details about each murder that only the killer could have known. The news was met with shock from the victims' families, who demanded precise answers from Du Lion about how and why he killed their loved ones.

This revelation garnered a lot of publicity both in the domestic and foreign media, as it was among the first cases to utilize improved DNA technology to solve a cold case. This led Walter Damen, a lawyer for the victims, to propose that a general DNA database to be established and that every Belgian citizen's DNA be stored there in an effort to solve cold cases. This suggestion was met with criticism by the National Institute of Criminalistics and Criminology, who stated that such a database would violate the justice system's fundamental principle of innocent until proven guilty.

As part of the investigation procedures, the Campus Vesta reconstructed some of the crime scenes at their headquarters in Ranst, allowing Du Lion to re-enact how he carried out the murders. That same month, the Antwerp judiciary expanded their investigation across the entire country in an order to determine whether Du Lion had struck in other areas.

In 2022, while Du Lion was still awaiting trial, Mazijn's brother Glenn gave an interview to Het Laatste Nieuws in which he shared their family and his own personal way of dealing with his sister's murder. In the interview, he stated that his parents had spent the remainder of their lives searching for Ariane's killer until they passed in 2005, and that if given the opportunity, he would not let Du Lion live.

== Trial, sentence, and imprisonment ==
Du Lion's trial was scheduled to begin in the summer of 2022, with his first appearance before the Assize Court set for 2 June.

His trial began on 3 February 2023. Throughout the proceedings, Du Lion admitted to killing Poppe, but remained silent on the other murders, as he claimed to not remember how he carried them out. This was despite the fact that just three days earlier, he apologized to Joël Le Tanter after hearing his testimony about how being suspected in the death of his girlfriend had irrevocably damaged his life.

On 14 February 2023, Du Lion was convicted on all counts after the jury deliberated for three and a half hours. During the sentencing phase, prosecutor Björn Backx demanded a life sentence for Du Lion, as he found no mitigating circumstances. A day later, he was sentenced to life imprisonment. During the reading of the verdict, Du Lion remained emotionless. As per Belgian law, he is eligible to apply for parole in October 2033.

=== Reactions to sentence ===
The relatives of his victims reacted with disbelief at Du Lion's claims that he did not remember the crimes themselves, as he was somehow able to recount chatting with them.

In 2020, Du Lion's daughter stated to the media that she wanted to change her surname, as she "never wanted to hear her father's name again". The application was subsequently granted two years later.

== In the media and culture ==
Shortly after his conviction, Du Lion was interviewed by reports from Pano. This was later used in a two-part episode of the programme covering his trial, titled "The Story of the Assizes" (Dutch: Het verhaal van assisen).

== See also ==
- List of serial killers by country
- Cold case
