= Ralph Andrews (murderer) =

American murderer, rapist, and suspected serial killer (1945–2006)

- Born: Ralph Raymond Andrews; 1945; Evanston, Illinois, U.S.
- Died: January 31, 2006 (aged 61); Stateville Correctional Center, Illinois, U.S.
- Conviction: Murder (x2)
- Penalty: Life imprisonment (x2)

Details
- Victims: 2 convicted, (Note: This does not include the death of Floyd Foster, which was ruled an accidental shooting.) 7+ suspected
- Span of crimes: 1972–1991
- Country: United States
- States: Illinois, possibly Michigan
- Date apprehended: August 15, 1991

Ralph Raymond Andrews (1945 – January 31, 2006) was an American murderer, rapist, and suspected serial killer who was convicted of two murders in Illinois, committed decades apart in 1972 and 1991. Besides these crimes, he was suspected of other murders in Cook County and the neighboring state of Michigan dating back to the early 1970s, but was never successfully convicted for any of them.

Andrews died serving two life sentences for his confirmed murders in 2006.

== Early life ==
Little is known about Andrews' background prior to his crimes, aside from the fact that he was born in Evanston in 1945. Beginning in 1961, Andrews was repeatedly charged for a variety of crimes ranging from transporting stolen goods to assaults on women, but he was either acquitted or avoided harsh prison sentences for a majority of them. He married sometime in the late 1960s or early 1970s, had three children, and worked various menial jobs throughout his life.

=== Assaults ===
Andrews' first notable crime occurred in April 1972, when he was charged with aggravated battery for strangling a woman he had previously dated in Evanston. He pleaded guilty to a reduced charge of simple battery and was given a lenient sentence of six months imprisonment.

The following year, in 1973, he picked up two teenage hitchhikers from Evanston and attempted to take them to a nearby forest preserve, where he intended to sexually assault them while threatening to stab them. The two girls fought back against him, resulting in all three sustaining injuries and the car swerving into a ditch near Edens Parkway, from where the teenagers escaped. All three were picked up by police and Andrews was charged with the crime, which he said he committed in self-defense after the girls supposedly attempted to rob him. While both victims testified at the trial, their testimony was not considered credible enough and Andrews' lawyers successfully convinced the jury to acquit him of all charges. Shortly after the trial, his wife divorced him and was granted sole custody of their children.

In April 1976, Andrews was working as a mechanic at a gas station in Wyoming, Michigan when he noticed an 18-year-old woman and her companion going to the restrooms. Andrews allegedly threatened them with a screwdriver and pushed them into the bathroom, where he raped them both. The women reported the attack to the police and Andrews was charged with first-degree criminal sexual conduct, but was acquitted in November of that year. The reason for the acquittal was that the jury erroneously believed that the women had offered sex in exchange for the car repairs due to a $20 bill being in one of the victims' shirt pockets, which Andrews had tucked in after releasing them.

In August 1978, Andrews took out a woman on a canoeing date to the Cook County Forest Preserve. At some point during the date, he knocked her out and tied her up, but did not inflict any further harm on her. He was later convicted of unlawful restraint and imprisoned for three years.

He was paroled in February 1980 and moved to an undisclosed city in Michigan. In August of that year, Andrews was driving along a rural road when he came across a 20-year-old female neighbor riding her bike. He knocked her off the bike, dragged her into his car and started driving. The woman fought back his attempts to put a rag soaked with chemicals over her face, alerting another neighbor who came to investigate. After realizing this, Andrews instead drove the woman to her home, where he attempted to explain it away to her father as just being an accident.

When the father demanded answers about why his daughter smelled like chemical fumes, Andrews hit him in the face. Despite this, Andrews was not arrested or even charged in this case, as the local prosecutor refused to open the case. The explanation given was that while the victim was frightened from the event, she suffered no real harm and there was no need for a prosecution.

By mid-1991, Andrews was living in Chicago and tended to the Pottawattomie Gardens as a gardener. People who knew him described him as a troubled man who often carried around a stun gun and made sinister remarks, claiming that he "wanted blood" if he was angry at something or someone.

== Murders ==
=== Confirmed ===
==== Susan Clarke ====
On August 28, 1977, 16-year-old high school student Susan Clarke disappeared from the village of Lincolnwood after leaving a house she was babysitting in. When she failed to turn up at a date with her boyfriend and then at another place she was supposed to babysit at, a search party was organized by her father and five members of the Illinois Search and Rescue Squad.

Two days later, her body was found by two boys weeding a vegetable garden near the Old Orchard Shopping Center in Skokie. They reported the finding to a nearby gardener working on a separate plot, who then informed the police. While her cause of death was not immediately determined, it was considered a likely homicide due to the fact that Clarke was found partially undressed, with her hands tied above her head and lying on her back, and that her body was covered with various plants in an attempt to conceal it.

Andrews was questioned as a suspect in the case early on, but not charged initially due to a lack of evidence. He was linked to the case again decades later after his conviction for the murder of Virginia Griffin, and eventually tried after bragging to a fellow inmate about how he had killed Clarke.

==== Virginia Griffin ====
During the midnight of August 12, 1991, police in Chicago's Rogers Park neighborhood received a report about a woman screaming. Due to a miscommunication about whether the incident was happening on the street or inside the Pottawattomie Gardens, the officers did not exit the car in time to investigate and were unable to locate the victim.

On the following morning, the body of 44-year-old Virginia Griffin, a homeless woman who often hung around the area, was found inside the Pottawattomie Gardens. She had been stabbed 32 times, tortured with a stun gun and disemboweled. Her blouse was wrapped around her neck, her bra was around her arms, and her pants were pulled down. A later autopsy also determined that she had been sodomized with an aluminum pipe.

Hours prior to her murder, Andrews had been fired from his job at the local Ace Hardware store following an incident in which he threatened to kill someone and waved around a stun gun, stemming from the demands that he be given a longer lunch hour. He and another man were then spotted drinking together with Griffin and several others, leading to him and the man being charged in her murder.

=== Suspected ===
After his arrest for the murder of Virginia Griffin, state authorities from Illinois and Michigan started investigating Andrews for possible involvement in multiple cold cases. In the 1994 article titled "Serial Suspect", posted in the Chicago Tribune, he was officially confirmed as a suspect in at least five murders, disappearances, and suspicious deaths.

==== Amy Alden ====
On September 22, 1972, workers with the County Highway Department who were mowing weeds near a cemetery in Skokie found the body of 15-year-old Amy Alden, who was reported missing two weeks prior. She was found wearing only a bra, blouse, and a raincoat, with a pair of blue jeans wrapped around her legs. While her cause of death was initially undetermined, the circumstances of her death and the fact that she was last seen hitchhiking suggested that she might have been murdered. Police also found a brown leather belt wrapped around her neck, further raising their suspicions that she had been sexually abused and strangled.

Several days after her body was found, an autopsy was ordered to determine the exact cause of death. Local newspapers continued to speculate on what might have happened, with one possible explanation suggesting that Alden was the victim of a hit-and-run. On September 26, it was announced that the autopsy results did not reveal a definitive cause of death.

At the time, authorities sought to link the Alden case to former Bible salesman Lee Jennings, who had recently been detained for sexually abusing and murdering 27-year-old Barbara Flanagan and her 18-month-old daughter Renee, but he was never charged with the murder.

Alden's case was one of the most prominently discussed ones in regards to the dangers of hitchhiking, with local newspapers mentioning it and warning people not to accept lifts from strangers.

At the time, Andrews was participating in a work release program and drove a bus along a route that Alden traveled on. On the date of her disappearance, Andrews arrived late and was questioned, but nothing indicated that he was responsible at the time. An acquaintance of Alden's later claimed that Andrews had threatened to strangle her with her own belt if he caught her smoking marijuana again.

==== Robin Feuerriegel ====
On November 18, 1972, two boys walking around an unincorporated area behind the Naval Air Station Glenview found the heavily decomposed body of a young woman. Due to the presence of a class ring with the initials "R" and "F", as well as other personal belongings, it was suspected that it belonged to 17-year-old office worker Robin Feuerriegel, who had recently moved from Newark, Ohio to Evanston. She had been reported missing on August 26, and was last seen leaving the home of her boyfriend in Skokie.

The body was definitively identified as Feuerriegel's five days later through her dental charts. While a definitive cause of death was not established at the time, the coroner ruled out that she had been shot to death.

==== Laura Anne Williams ====
On May 2, 1977, less than five years after Feuerriegel's death, a repairman working on a telephone pole near the Naval Air Station Glenview spotted what appeared to be the body of a young woman near a secluded section near Old Willow Road. He reported the finding to the police, who soon identified the victim as 16-year-old Laura Anne Williams, a Chicago resident who was last seen alive leaving her grandparents' home to visit some friends.

Williams had been stabbed to death, with injuries on one of her legs indicating that she had attempted to defend herself from her assailant. Due to the popularity of the dumping site as a lovers' lane, it was suggested that she was likely killed elsewhere and then simply dropped off here. Approximately a month after her murder, authorities announced that they were searching for two suspects in her murder, as she was last seen entering their car. The men were both white; one was described as aged between 20 and 25; with light brown curly hair, a receding hairline and bushy sideburns. The other man appeared younger, between 18 and 20, with dark brown hair and a thin mustache.

==== Arvella Thomas ====
On April 12, 1978, the body of 14-year-old Arvella Louise Thomas was found in a Skokie alley, having suffered three stab wounds, one in the back and two in the chest. She also had a pantyhose wrapped around her neck.

Thomas was last seen alive the previous day, when she was attempting to get a car fare from a stranger. Her family immediately suspected that her murder was linked to the other cases, stating that they believed a "maniac" was responsible for the crimes.

Sometime after her murder, police confiscated a bloody knife from Andrews' car. When queried about the source of the blood, he claimed that from either fish or deer, but an analysis determined that it was actually human, close to Thomas' blood type. Despite this revelation, Andrews was not charged in this case.

==== Floyd Foster ====
On November 21, 1982, Andrews was out deer hunting with two men – 51-year-old Floyd Glen Foster and his 22-year-old son, Jerry Lee. According to the official account, they were walking deep into a swamp near Ravenna, Michigan when Andrews supposedly fell into a creek. Foster was fatally shot in the chest by Andrews's rifle while attempting to help Andrews out. The shooting was deemed by investigators to be caused by the accidental discharge of the rifle when Foster grabbed the gun's barrel.

Andrews then left to call for help while Jerry attempted to administer first aid. Foster was eventually driven to a hospital in Muskegon, where he succumbed to his injuries. No charges were brought against Andrews, as the whole ordeal was blamed on negligence, with investigators noting that none of the three men were wearing the required orange clothing during hunting season. Years later, Floyd Foster's son Jerry stated that he always suspected that Andrews had killed his father intentionally and the death was not an accident.

== Arrest and trials ==
=== Arrest and investigation into old crimes ===
Three days after the Griffin murder, Chicago police filed charges against Andrews and another unnamed man. The charges against the unnamed man were later dropped, while Andrews was held without bond. While searching through his apartment, they found multiple items linking him directly to the crime, including two knives, a stun gun, a bloody pai and clothing, and hairs that did not belong to Andrews. All of these were sent for examination, while Chicago police started contacting their colleagues in Skokie and other areas Andrews was known to reside in. On August 24, prosecutors announced that some of the blood samples were found to be a match to the Griffin crime scene.

After these revelations, the press and local authorities heavily scrutinized Andrews' previous convictions and accusations, questioning whether a majority of his acquittals should have been allowed in the first place. Among the people who gave interviews concerning this included one of the teenage girls in the 1973, Betty Hermes, as well as two jurors who had voted to acquit Andrews in that case. They all stated that one of the main reasons why Andrews escaped conviction is because both girls admitted to smoking marijuana on that night, leading to their credibility being damaged.

=== Griffin trial ===
After being charged with the Griffin murder, Andrews was scheduled to go on trial for the crime, in which the prosecution sought the death penalty against him. Due to the overwhelming evidence against him, he was found guilty on all counts by the jury on July 15, 1993.

During the sentencing phase, numerous witnesses testified against Andrews and accused him of being responsible for other violent crimes in the past. Among them was Betty Hermes and Skokie Police Sgt. Brent Fowler, who alleged that Andrews had implicated himself in the murders of Amy Alden and Susan Clarke while under hypnosis, but that this was not considered credible enough evidence for a conviction. In addition, Andrews' ex-girlfriend Mary Ebeling testified that shortly after the supposed accidental shooting of Floyd Foster back in 1982, Andrews returned home and seemed non-chalant about the death. Foster's own son, Jerry, was also called in to testify, stating that after falling down, Andrews pointed the gun at his father twice before it discharged.

In the end, on August 18, 1994, Judge Thomas Durkin opted to sentence Andrews to life imprisonment. In his final statement, the judge called him "an evil man" who poisoned the lives of everyone around him.

=== Clarke trial ===
In May 1999, Andrews was charged with the Clarke murder after a cellmate contacted the authorities and informed them about his supposed bragging about committing the crime. Shortly afterwards, another unnamed inmate was outfitted with a concealed recording device and recorded a conversation with Andrews, who again willingly admitted to killing Clarke. Once officially indicted, Andrews pleaded not guilty to the murder charge.

During the trial proceedings, Judge Edward M. Fiala Jr. allowed prosecutors to present evidence from Andrews' previous murder trial and the 1973 attack to be used in the Clarke trial. This was protested by Andrews' public defender Shelton Green, who argued that this would cause bias against his client. In October 1991, the items were sent to a lab for testing.

Days after this decision, Clarke's family members alerted prosecutors that they had received a letter written by Andrews. In said letter, Andrews apologized for the ordeal they were going through, but categorically denied involvement for any of the crimes he was accused of. Judge Fiala criticized Andrews for writing the letter and ordered that any correspondence be turned over to the court – in response, Green argued that there was nothing threatening in the letter that warranted such an action.

In March 2003, Andrews unexpectedly pleaded guilty to the murder in an attempt to avoid the death penalty. In the following month, he was given a second life term by Judge Marjorie Laws.

== Death and aftermath ==
Less than two years after his conviction for the Clarke homicide, Andrews died on January 31, 2006, inside the Stateville Correctional Center.

In 2017, Andrews was briefly considered as an alternative suspect in the 1985 murder of 15-year-old Kristy Wesselman after the man put on trial for the murder, Michael R. Jones, petitioned to introduce this theory to the court. This was eventually ruled out, and Jones subsequently pleaded guilty to the murder, receiving an 80-year sentence.

== See also ==
- Cold case

== Books ==
- Opal Roux. True Crime Story: I Survived a Monster. ISBN 1500386561.
