= Murder of Robin Cornell and Lisa Story =

Double murder and solved cold case in Florida, US

- Lisa Story (Left) and Robin Cornell (right), both of victims
- Location: Cape Coral, Florida, United States
- Date: May 10, 1990; 36 years ago
- Attack type: Murder and rape
- Deaths: Lisa Story, 32; Robin Cornell, 11
- Verdict: Guilty
- Convictions: First-degree murder
- Sentence: Death (June 26, 2023)
- Convicted: Joseph Zieler

On May 10, 1990, in Cape Coral, Florida, 11-year-old Robin Cornell and her 32-year-old babysitter Lisa Story were both raped and murdered by an intruder, and their bodies were found by Cornell's mother inside their Cape Coral apartment. The murders were left unsolved for about 26 years before DNA testing identified Joseph Adam Zieler (born April 15, 1962), who was arrested in 2016 on an unrelated assault charge, as the killer of the case. Zieler was convicted in 2023 of both murders and sentenced to death.

== Murders ==
On May 10, 1990, an 11-year-old girl and her 32-year-old babysitter were both murdered inside the girl's apartment in Cape Coral, Florida.

The day before, on the evening of May 9, 1990, the two victims, 11-year-old Robin Marie Cornell and her 32-year-old babysitter Lisa Diane Story, were last seen alive by Cornell's mother, who left and went to her boyfriend's apartment to watch a basketball game. At that time, Story, a friend of Cornell's mother, had recently moved into the same apartment with the mother-daughter pair to share living expenses. Although Cornell's mother intended to stay until the end of the basketball match, she fell asleep at her boyfriend's home until about 4am on May 10, 1990, and she rushed back home to prepare for her work shift at a local hospital.

Upon arriving home, Cornell's mother discovered that the sliding glass door was open and the front door was also locked by the broken door handle (it was previously locked only at the deadbolt), and she also found the apartment disorganized. Cornell's mother went up the stairs and first reached Story's bedroom, where she found Story's naked body on the bed. She rushed to her daughter's bedroom, where Cornell was also lying dead on the floor, and Cornell's mother called the police. When both victims were found, Story was lying on her right side with a pillow partially covering her head, had extensive injuries on her anal cavity and significant bleeding, and scratches on her body, while Cornell's legs were spread apart with a vibrator in between, and she had bleeding from her vaginal area, plus bruises and scrapes on her face and her lips were purple. A pornographic magazine was also found laying open near Story's corpse, while a ripped pair of underwear was also found in Cornell's room.

Autopsy reports revealed that both victims were raped and died of asphyxia by suffocation. The bleeding and severe injuries in Story's anal cavity indicated that she was being sexually penetrated in the anus with an object, while similarly, Cornell's vaginal injuries and bleeding were also caused by sexual penetration with an object, proving that both victims were sexually assaulted by their attacker(s) before they were murdered.

== Investigation ==
=== Early investigations ===
Upon the revelation of the killings, the police conducted extensive investigations into the murders of Robin Cornell and Lisa Story, although the case went cold and went unsolved for the following 26 years before the killer's arrest. Throughout the next 26 years before it was solved, the 1990 Cape Coral murders remained as one of Southwest Florida's most high-profile cold cases.

In their first-hand investigations, the police discovered items that did not belong to the household. Among them were a keychain with a horseshoe-shaped Etienne Aigner charm and four keys (two Toyota car keys and two house keys belonging to neither of the house's occupants), and a pair of white socks. They were believed to be left behind by the killer, and DNA traces were also found inside the house. Test results revealed that they belonged to a White male with blood type O. As the investigators found that the killer likely read a pornographic magazine before allegedly violating the bodies of the victims, forensic psychologist Richard Walter believed that the killer may fit a certain deviant profile. In order to crack the case, the Cape Coral police set up a homicide hotline to encourage people with any information about the crime to contact them, and also sought the assistance of the Florida Department of Law Enforcement and State Attorney's Office to investigate the double murder.

During the investigations, the police also investigated possible suspects for any links to the double murder. One of them was suspected serial killer Frank Thaniel Potts, who was suspected for at least 15 murders, and he was investigated in March 1994 for possible involvement in the Cape Coral murders after he was arrested for the sexual assault of a 11-year-old girl. A month later, in April 1994, Potts was ruled out as a suspect after forensic investigations cleared him, since he had blood type A while the real killer's blood type was O. Potts was ultimately sentenced to life imprisonment for one of the murders in Alabama, and he died in prison in 2023 while serving a separate life term in Florida for the sexual assault case.

Another possible suspect was serial killer Donald Leroy Evans, who confessed to multiple murders in Mississippi and Florida, and the Cape Coral police investigated him as a suspect behind the murders of Cornell and Story at one point. Subsequently, Evans was sentenced to death for killing and raping a girl in Mississippi, but he later died in 1999 after being stabbed by a fellow death row prisoner.

Seven years after the murders, Cornell's mother revealed in an interview that she was still haunted by the death of her daughter and remembered the sight of her daughter's body when she first saw it. It was also revealed at this point that Story's mother had died two years prior in 1995, and Story's father felt he was forgotten but wished for the case to be solved before he would die, and Cornell's mother promised to Story's mother that she would continue to fight for justice and witness the killer(s) being caught and executed for murdering their daughters.

In March 2006, retired New York police detective Fidel Balan was appointed to investigate the 1990 Cape Coral murders with a six-month period.

In 2005 and September 2007 respectively, the 1990 Cape Coral murders were featured on true crime television show America's Most Wanted.

In May 2013, nearing the 23rd anniversary of the Cape Coral murders, Cornell's mother stated she did not give up hope over the case, and she strived to continue her quest to seek justice for her daughter, hoping that the murderer could be caught one day.

=== 2016 breakthrough and arrest ===
In September 2016, the police announced that they arrested a 54-year-old suspect behind the murders, 26 years after it was committed. The DNA of the suspect, Joseph Adam Zieler, was matched to the ones found at the murder scene, and he was therefore held for investigations in the murder case.

At that time, Zieler was already in police custody since August 27, 2016, for an unrelated assault charge, pertaining to an incident where he shot his son with an air rifle, and during investigations into the shooting, the police took DNA samples from Zieler and therefore uncovered his involvement in the unsolved 1990 Cape Coral murders. It was further revealed that Zieler was the son of a former police officer employed under the Cape Coral Police Department, but Zieler's father, who served from 1979 to 1984, was fired from the police force after he was caught stealing steak, crab legs and cheesecake from a restaurant, and therefore served five years of probation and 750 hours of community service for burglary and grand theft.

On September 29, 2016, Zieler was charged with raping and murdering Robin Cornell and Lisa Story. Zieler officially entered a plea of not guilty against the murder charges on October 5, 2016.

== Pre-trial proceedings ==
On November 3, 2016, a Lee County grand jury formally indicted Zieler for two counts of first-degree murder, as well as sexual battery on a child less than 12 years of age, sexually battery with a deadly weapon or great force and first-degree burglary with assault or battery. Under Florida state law, the offence of first-degree murder carries either the death penalty or life imprisonment. On November 30, 2016, the Lee County District Attorney's Office announced that the prosecution would seek the death penalty against Zieler.

In October 2020, Zieler filed a motion seeking to appoint a forensic expert to challenge the DNA and forensic evidence provided by the authorities.

In December 2020, Zieler was once again indicted by a grand jury based on an amended charge sheet, which included the amended capital charges of first-degree murder. Similarly, Zieler pleaded not guilty to the amended charges, which also warranted the death penalty.

In February 2022, Zieler filed a petition for a writ of prohibition, seeking to halt his court case, as well as a petition for a writ of habeas corpus. However, in March 2022, the Florida Supreme Court rejected the motions.

Initially, Zieler's trial was scheduled to begin in August 2022, but in July 2022, a month before it was slated to begin, Zieler's trial was re-scheduled to begin in October 2022. However, the issue with the availability of experts and evidence led to the trial being postponed till February 2023.

== Trial ==
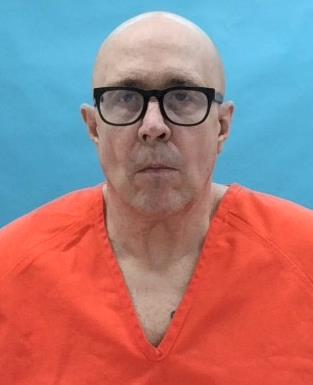
2023 mugshot of Joseph Zieler

On February 27, 2023, Joseph Zieler stood trial before a Lee County jury for the first-degree murders of Lisa Story and Robin Cornell.

During the trial, Zieler, who earlier denied knowing the victims, claimed that he knew the mother of Cornell through a one-night stand that allegedly took place months before the double murder, and asserted that it was the reason his DNA was there at the scene of crime, and he also called her a pig for not washing the sheets. Zieler also denied that he murdered the victims and claimed he was at another state at the time of the crimes, and even testified that he had severe memory loss after a car accident decades prior. However, Cornell's mother stated she never met Zieler or slept with him, and Zieler's ex-girlfriend stated that Zieler had no problem with his memory and could read and write after the accident.

On May 18, 2023, the jury convicted Zieler of both counts of first-degree murder.

On May 25, 2023, by a majority vote of 10–2, the jury recommended two death sentences for Zieler on both counts of first-degree murder. At the time of sentencing, the state of Florida passed a new death penalty law to allow juries to impose the death penalty by a majority vote from eight or more jurors, and this law was signed by Florida Governor Ron DeSantis in April 2023, a month before Zieler's sentencing. This legislation was made partly due to the Parkland school shooter Nikolas Cruz escaping the death penalty for murdering 17 students and school staff members after the jury failed to reach a unanimous vote for capital punishment.

On June 26, 2023, Zieler returned to court for a hearing, during which the judge would decide on his sentence after hearing final testimonies from the witnesses. Prior to his sentencing, Zieler whispered to his lawyer Kevin Shirley before he hit him in the face, and three bailiffs had to restrain him and escort him out of the courtroom. Zieler was returned to the courtroom about 10 minutes later, and he continued to insist he was innocent and refused to let his family members testify for him on his behalf. Zieler also reportedly witnessed growling in court and angrily flashed the word "killer" across his teeth.

During the hearing, six witnesses, including the victims' family members and friends, testified in court. Cornell's sister stated that she was affected by seeing the photos showing the body of her late sister, and stated Zieler should never be able to harm other people. Story's then boyfriend stated that his late girlfriend's family were deeply impacted by the murder of Story, adding that Story's father "deteriorated" while Story's mother died of a broken heart due to their daughter's murder. Story's eldest sister also stated that she and her brother were emotionally affected to the extent that she underwent psychotherapy for a year. Cornell's former best friend from elementary school stated that before losing her friend, she and Cornell shared an inseparable friendship lasting two years and she only felt relieved after a long time.

On that same day, Lee Circuit Judge Robert Branning followed the jury's recommendation and formally sentenced 61-year-old Joseph Zieler to death for the murders of Lisa Story and Robin Cornell. During sentencing, Judge Branning quoted the case, "The aggravating factors are horrific and every parent's worst nightmare". At the end of the sentencing trial, Cornell's mother expressed that justice was finally served for the deaths of both her daughter and Story, and Story's ex-boyfriend expressed his gratitude to the detectives and other people for not giving up on cracking the case.

== Appeal ==
On June 3, 2023, Joseph Zieler filed an appeal against his conviction while he was awaiting sentencing for the Cape Coral murders.

On January 9, 2025, Zieler filed a direct appeal against his death sentence to the Florida Supreme Court, where a February 5 hearing was scheduled for the appeal. In response to Zieler's upcoming appeal, Robin Cornell's mother stated she continued to keep her faith in the justice system and honor the legacy of both her daughter and Lisa Story by remembering them, and confirmed she would not attend the appeal hearing in person.

On April 17, 2026, the Florida Supreme Court dismissed Zieler's direct appeal against his death sentences for the double murder.

As of 2026, Zieler remains incarcerated on death row at the Union Correctional Institution.

== See also ==
- Capital punishment in Florida
- List of death row inmates in the United States § Florida
- List of murdered American children
