= Ronald Lee Moore =

American murderer (1967–2008)

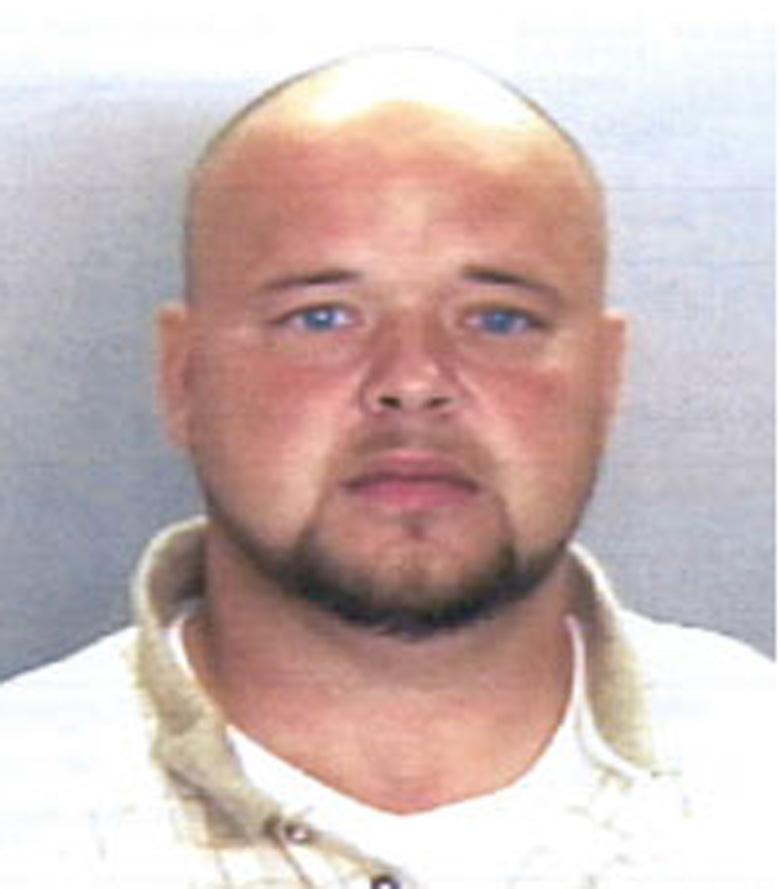
- Moore's 2007 wanted photo
- Born: May 3, 1967; Baltimore, Maryland, U.S.
- Died: January 5, 2008 (aged 40); Jefferson, Louisiana, U.S.
- Cause of death: Suicide by hanging

Details
- Victims: 2+
- Span of crimes: 1996–1999
- Country: United States
- States: Maryland, South Carolina
- Date apprehended: December 24, 2007

Ronald Lee Moore (May 3, 1967 – January 5, 2008) was an American fugitive, murderer, rapist, and suspected serial killer who murdered at least two women between 1996 and 1999. He was not connected to either murder until over a decade later. In November 2007, while incarcerated in Baltimore for burglary, Moore was accidentally released due to a clerical error. He became a wanted fugitive and was featured on the television series America's Most Wanted. Moore was captured on December 24, 2007, but committed suicide by hanging in January 2008 at the Nelson Coleman Correctional Center in Louisiana. After his suicide, DNA testing linked him to other crimes and he was mentioned in the podcast Serial as a possible suspect in the killing of Hae Min Lee.

== Murders ==
=== Shawn Marie O´Neal ===
The first murder Moore is known to have committed was of 23-year-old Shawn Marie Neal, an escort who lived in Leland, North Carolina. On June 2, 1996, her dead body was found strangled and hanged in a condominium in North Myrtle Beach, South Carolina. Neal's fiancé had reported her missing after she failed to return home from going to meet a man named Don Gibson. Police later determined the name was an alias. Neal left behind a 4-year-old daughter, her mother, and her fiancé. The murder became a cold case and went unsolved for nearly twenty-four years.

In 2017, the case was reopened and a new investigation was launched. In 2019, new DNA testing was conducted on a bedspread and some towels that had been found at the crime scene. The DNA obtained matched Moore's and the case was officially closed in February 2020, with Moore confirmed as Neal's killer. Authorities believe Moore had been passing through South Carolina while on his way to Louisiana and was running from the law. Moore had no ties to Neal and police believe the killing was random.

=== Annelise Hyang Suk Lee ===
The second known victim of Moore's was 27-year-old Annelise Hyang Suk Lee, a Korean-American woman who was murdered in 1999 in Maryland. Lee was last seen alive on December 10, 1999, in a parking lot outside her apartment after she was dropped off at home by her employer. Lee's employer grew concerned when she did not show up for work or answer her phone and she was reported missing to the police. On December 13, 1999, Lee's body was found in her Owings Mills, Maryland apartment by a maintenance worker. An autopsy determined that she had died of blunt force trauma and strangulation. The murder went unsolved for nearly fourteen years.

In March 2013, several pieces of evidence were re-examined and a DNA profile was developed. The profile was found to match Moore and he was confirmed as Lee's killer.

== Fugitive ==
In 2000, Moore was arrested for assault and burglary and was sentenced to thirteen years in prison. He had been arrested frequently throughout his life for various different burglary offenses and served many years in Maryland jails. In July 2006, while serving time in prison, Moore was connected to an unsolved rape via DNA. In October 1999, Moore broke into a woman's apartment, shocked her with a cattle prod, and forced her to perform sexual acts on him.

On November 21, 2007, Moore was accidentally released from the Baltimore City Correctional Center. Officials had been instructed to move Moore to the Anne Arundel County Detention Center but due to a clerical error he was released instead. Moore became a wanted fugitive and fled from Maryland to Louisiana. His release attracted national attention and he was profiled on the television series America's Most Wanted.

On December 24, 2007, Moore was arrested in Louisiana. He was captured in Destrehan after breaking into a home on Christmas Eve. Police responded to an alarm at a residence and saw evidence of a break-in. A deputy heading to the crime scene spotted Moore in the area riding a bicycle and holding a bag full of burglary tools. Moore was detained and taken into custody.

== Death ==
Moore was to be extradited from Louisiana to Maryland to stand trial. While awaiting extradition, he was held at the Nelson Coleman Correctional Center in Hahnville. On January 5, 2008, Moore committed suicide by hanging in his cell at the prison. He was found hanging by the drawstring of a mesh laundry bag which he had tied to an air-conditioning vent over the toilet in his jail cell. He was quickly untied and nurses at the prison performed CPR on him. After a few minutes Moore began to breathe again.

Moore was transferred to St. Charles Parish Hospital and was later moved to the Ochsner Medical Center in Jefferson Parish. He was described as being in a very critical condition. In the early hours of January 5, Moore succumbed to his injuries and was pronounced dead by doctors at the Ochsner Medical Center.

== Links to other crimes ==
It was not until over five years after his suicide that Moore was connected to the murder of Annelise Hyang Suk Lee via new DNA testing. He was later linked to the unsolved murder of Neal in 2020 via DNA evidence. Moore was mentioned in the first season of the podcast Serial as a possible suspect in the killing of Hae Min Lee; however, DNA evidence later obtained did not match Moore's. Multiple agencies, including the FBI, are continuing to look at whether Moore could be responsible for any other unsolved murders.
