= Disappearance of Sheila Fox (1972) =

British woman found alive after 52 years

Sheila Fox
- Born: 1956; Coventry, England
- Disappeared: 1972–2024
- Known for: Missing person for 52 years

Sheila Fox (born 1956 in Coventry, England) is a British woman that went missing in 1972, at age 16. She gained international media attention in 2024, when her missing person case was officially closed after police found her alive and well 52 years later, in 2024.

== Biography and disappearance ==
Fox grew up in a family of Irish immigrants, as her parents left Ireland after World War II looking forward to start a new life.

In March 1972, she ran away from home. It is theorised that she had an affair with an older bartender from London her parents didn't approve of. After her departure, she lost contact with her family and married. In July 1973, she gave birth to her son Robert.

Not much is publicly known about her life in the following years, except her effort to get in touch with her family again in the 1980s. In 1983, she remarried and lived in London.

During that time, her family temporarily moved to Canada in 1976 and later settled in Watford, England.

== Closure of the case ==
On 29 December 2024, the cold case task force of the local police picked up the case again and published a fresh appeal online to help find Fox. In a matter of hours, the police were contacted by neighbours and relatives, leading to the closure of the case after more than fifty years.

It was concluded that the family simply forgot to close the case.

== See also ==
- Lucy Ann Johnson
