= Lucy Ann Johnson =

Formerly missing Canadian woman (born 1935)

- Born: Lucy Ann Carvell; October 14, 1935 (age 90); Skagway, Territory of Alaska, U.S.
- Disappeared: September 1961 – June 2013 (51 years and 9 months); Whalley, Surrey, British Columbia, Canada
- Status: Found alive
- Known for: Disappearance
- Height: 5 ft 5 in (1.65 m)
- Spouse: Marvin Johnson (m. 1954–1990)
- Children: Linda Evans (née Johnson), Daniel Johnson; 4 others

Lucy Ann Johnson (born October 14, 1935) is an American-Canadian woman who was reported missing in May 1965, after not having been seen since September 1961. Johnson was found alive in July 2013 after the Royal Canadian Mounted Police (RCMP) reopened the investigation into her disappearance.

== Disappearance ==
Lucy Ann Johnson is an Alaska native who, prior to her disappearance, was living in Surrey, British Columbia with her husband Marvin and their two children, Linda and Daniel. She was seen by a neighbour in the 10300-block of 145A Street, Surrey, in September 1961. Johnson was finally reported missing by her husband Marvin on May 14, 1965, who admitted she actually had gone missing years earlier. The police believed that foul play was involved in her disappearance, and her husband was suspected of her murder. Marvin was interrogated, neighbours were questioned, and the family's yard was excavated, but no evidence was found. The trail went cold and charges against him were never laid. Marvin later remarried and died in the 1990s of natural causes. In the years following Johnson's disappearance, investigators continued to do DNA tests on unidentified remains, but never found any matches.

== Rediscovery ==
In June 2013, almost 52 years after Johnson went missing, the Royal Canadian Mounted Police (RCMP) in Surrey highlighted her disappearance as a cold case in their "Missing of the Month" series. Following that, Johnson's daughter, Linda Evans, decided to do an investigation of her own, and was able to find old documents indicating that Johnson had lived in the community of Carcross, Yukon, before moving to British Columbia and settling down. In July, Evans placed a plea for help in the Yukon News, stating, "I am looking for my relatives. My grandparents' names are Margaret [and] Andrew Carvell. My mother's name is Lucy Ann Carvell. She was born Oct. 14, 1935 in Skagway." She received a reply from a woman named Rhonda from Whitehorse, Yukon, who claimed that Johnson was her mother. Johnson, who was then 77 years old, was discovered alive and well in Yukon; she had remarried and had four more children. Johnson said she had disappeared because her late husband Marvin was abusive, and that she tried to take her children with her, but he would not allow it.

A few months after Johnson's rediscovery, Evans flew to Whitehorse to reunite with her mother and to meet Rhonda and her three other half-siblings.

== See also ==
- List of solved missing person cases
