= Delmer Smith =

American convicted murderer (born 1971)

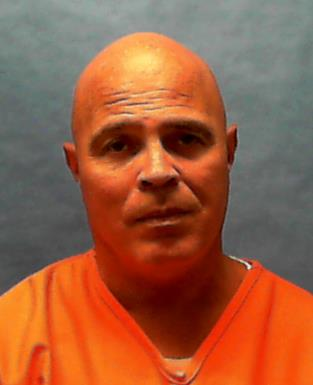
- Born: July 19, 1971 (age 55); Michigan, U.S.
- Status: Incarcerated on death row
- Convictions: First degree murder Second degree murder Sexual battery with a weapon (×2); Kidnapping; Armed robbery
- Penalty: Briles murder: Death; Georgann murder: life imprisonment

Details
- Victims: 2
- Date: April 5 – August 3, 2009
- Country: United States
- State: Florida
- Locations: Sarasota County, Florida (April 2009); Manatee County, Florida (August 2009)
- Date apprehended: October 5, 2009
- Imprisoned at: Union Correctional Institution

Delmer Smith III (born July 19, 1971) is an American death row inmate convicted of two murders in Florida. In 2009, Smith was involved in multiple home invasions and robberies, two of which ended with the deaths of two victims. In the first case on April 5, 2009, Smith raped and murdered 36-year-old Georgann Smith in the midst of robbing her home. In the other case on August 3, 2009, Smith killed 48-year-old Kathleen Briles by bludgeoning her with a sewing machine.

Two months after his second murder, Smith was arrested and charged with the murder of Briles and the other robbery cases connected to him. He was convicted of first-degree murder and sentenced to death in 2013. While on death row for Briles's murder, Smith was linked to the murder of Georgann Smith via DNA tests in 2018, and he was sentenced to life imprisonment for second-degree murder in 2019. As of 2026, Smith remains on death row.

== 2009 robbery and murder spree ==
=== Georgann Smith ===
On April 5, 2009, Delmer Smith committed his first murder, killing 36-year-old Georgann Smith (also spelled Georgeann Smith) while robbing her home in Sarasota County, Florida. Smith attacked Georgann, tied her up and raped her before he beat her to death with a baseball bat. Georgann's body was found after her friends, who realized that she did not show up for work, went to her house to check on her. Autopsy reports confirmed that Georgann died of injuries caused by the baseball bat, and that there were foreign objects left inside her body as a result of the sexual assault inflicted by Smith.

Georgann's murder was unsolved until November 2017, when test results matched Smith to a DNA profile found on the victim's clothes. This prompted further investigation by the authorities. Smith was charged for the murder in January 2018 while he was on death row for another woman's murder.

=== Kathleen Briles ===
On August 3, 2009, Smith committed his second murder by killing 48-year-old Kathleen Briles in her home in Manatee County, Florida. On that afternoon, when Briles returned home from her grocery run, she was confronted by Smith outside her house, and Smith forcibly dragged her inside her house, where he tied her up and beat her. Smith took a 23-pound cast iron sewing machine and smashed Briles's head with it. Smith stole numerous items from the house before he departed.

Briles's body was found by her husband, a doctor, after he returned home from work. Before discovering her body, Briles's husband found that his wife's car was not parked in its usual place and the lights in the house were switched off, and after he turned them on, he saw his wife lying facedown in a pool of blood on the living room floor. Briles's husband testified that when he found his wife's body, her hands and feet were bound with duct tape, and her mouth was covered with duct tape, and her left jaw and head were deformed, with the sewing machine placed next to her body. He also found that the house was ransacked and about $30,000 to $40,000 worth of jewelry was missing.

An autopsy report showed that Briles was hit multiple times to the back of her head, at least four to five times to the right side of her skull, and another four to five blows to another portion of her head. According to medical examiner Wilson Broussard, the head was so badly beaten that brain matter was visible, and Briles also sustained a few abrasions around her shoulders, a bruised elbow and a lacerated liver. The large amount of blood at the crime scene was thought to have come from Briles's head wounds.

=== Other home invasion crimes ===
Apart from the murders of Georgann and Briles, Smith was also involved in at least four to ten home invasion attacks between February and May 2009, and in those cases, Smith was said to have targeted women who were alone at home. Most of the victims were tied up, raped and violently beaten by Smith.

In one of these cases, which happened on the night of March 14, 2009, Smith attacked and robbed an elderly woman who was alone in her home at Sarasota, Florida. The woman, whose husband was out of town at that time, was threatened by Smith to keep silent or she would be killed, and she was dragged to every room in the house, with Smith asking each time where she kept any valuables. Smith had stolen a computer with a mouse and speakers, a TV, an iPod and its docking station, and $250 in cash. Before he left, he tied the victim's hands and feet with electrical cords and wrapped them around her neck, but the woman freed herself and sought a neighbor's help to call the police. The woman was later hospitalized for a heart attack as a result of the terror she underwent during the robbery. The victim would become a witness against Smith in his robbery trial.

== Arrest and charges ==
On October 5, 2009, two months after he killed Kathleen Briles, Delmer Smith was linked via DNA testing to at least four home invasion cases. Smith was not identified immediately because his DNA profile, which was collected during his sentence in a federal prison for a 1995 bank robbery case, was entered into the FBI database long after his September 2008 release due to a large processing backlog. He was consequently charged with multiple counts of armed home invasion, false imprisonment, and sexual battery.

In February 2010, the investigation into Briles's murder reached a breakthrough after the DNA testing identified Smith as the perpetrator in this case. Smith was charged with murdering Briles.

On March 2, 2010, a Manatee County grand jury indicted Delmer Smith for the murder of Briles.

On April 29, 2010, Smith pleaded not guilty to the murder of Briles. On May 17, 2010, Assistant State Attorney Brian Iten announced that the prosecution was seeking the death penalty for Smith.

== Trial for lesser charges ==
Before he was put on trial for murder, Delmer Smith was first tried for lesser charges. On September 11, 2010, Smith was found guilty of misdemeanor battery for an unrelated case of bar fight that happened in August 2009. He was sentenced to 11 months and 29 days in prison.

In late November 2011, Smith was scheduled to stand trial in December 2011 for one of the home invasion cases, the March 2009 attack of the woman, and the prosecution planned to seek the maximum sentence of life imprisonment on account of his extensive criminal record. This strategic decision was made by the prosecution to ensure that they had a better chance of securing the death penalty for Smith in his upcoming trial for Kathleen Briles's murder, because the home invasion conviction, coupled with a potential life sentence, could be used as an aggravating factor to justify the imposition of a death sentence.

On December 8, 2011, Smith was found guilty of home invasion robbery and armed kidnapping. On December 28, 2011, Smith was sentenced to life without parole for the home invasion attacks.

== First murder trial ==
On July 30, 2012, Delmer Smith was officially put on trial for the murder of Kathleen Briles. Jury selection began on the same day. A 12-member jury was selected on August 3, 2012, and opening arguments were scheduled on August 6, 2012.

On August 9, 2012, the jury found Smith guilty of first-degree murder. On August 14, 2012, the jury unanimously voted to impose the death penalty for Smith.

On May 28, 2013, Smith was sentenced to death by Manatee County Circuit Judge Peter Dubensky.

== Second murder trial ==
In November 2017, eight years after the murder of Georgann Smith, DNA tests linked Delmer Smith as the killer. On January 22, 2018, Smith was charged with the rape and murder of Georgann. He was transferred out of prison and taken to Sarasota County to face charges for the crime.

On June 14, 2019, Smith was found guilty of second-degree murder and two counts of sexual battery with a deadly weapon. Upon his conviction, Judge Charles Roberts sentenced Smith to three concurrent life sentences.

== Death row ==
On July 9, 2015, the Florida Supreme Court rejected Delmer Smith's appeal against his death sentence. On January 25, 2016, the U.S. Supreme Court denied Smith's appeal against his death sentence.

A July 2017 report revealed that Circuit Judge Diana Moreland granted Smith an evidential hearing to hear his post-conviction claims, which included allegations of ineffective trial counsel. On December 28, 2017, Circuit Judge Diana Moreland dismissed Smith's appeal for post-conviction relief. On March 5, 2020, the Florida Supreme Court dismissed Smith's post-conviction petition.

As of 2026, Smith remains on death row at the Union Correctional Institution.

== See also ==
- Capital punishment in Florida
- List of death row inmates in the United States § Florida
