= Jose Guerrero (serial killer) =

American serial killer

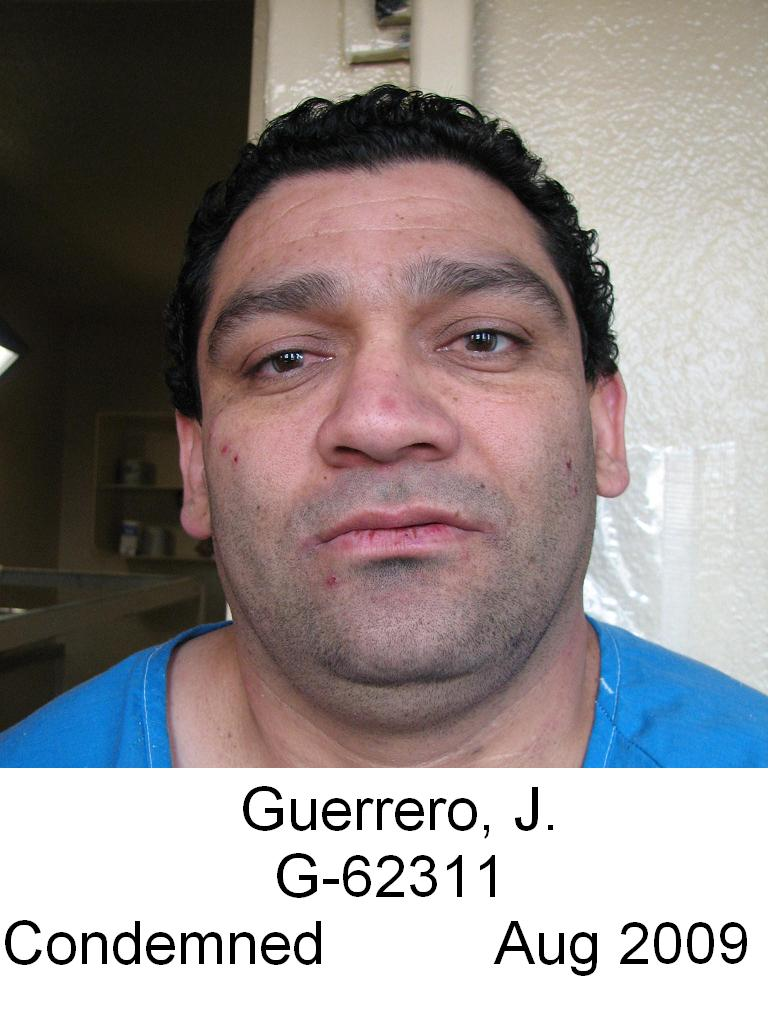
- Mug shot of Guerrero, 2009
- Born: 1973 (age 52–53)
- Convictions: First degree murder with special circumstances (3 counts); Attempted murder
- Penalty: Death

Details
- Victims: 3
- Span of crimes: 1995–1998
- Country: United States
- State: California
- Date apprehended: October 2004

Jose Guerrero (born 1973) is an American serial killer who abducted and killed three women and attempted to kill a fourth in Madera, California, from 1995 to 1998. He was not linked to the crimes until nearly six years later via DNA testing after he was jailed for a DUI. He was later found guilty and given the death penalty in 2009.

== Murders ==
It is believed Guerrero met all of his victims along C Street in Madera, an area known for its high percentage of prostitution, though not all of his victims were prostitutes. Initially, it was believed that the cases were unrelated to each other until DNA tests in 2004. Guerrero's DNA was linked to three murders and one attempted murder:

=== Julie Ann Woodley ===
In the morning hours of April 23, 1995, a farmworker found the body of a woman in an orchard just south of Madera. Sheriff's deputies later arrived and confirmed the body to be Julie Ann Woodley, also known as Julie Ann McDonald. A native of Madera, Woodley was a 42-year-old mother of two, though her children did not live with her. She had last been seen alive the previous night about eight hours before her body was found on Madera's south side. An autopsy was conducted on her body, and the coroner stated that she had been raped, sodomized and shot.

=== Evelyn Estrada ===
On November 28, 1995, 42-year-old Evelyn Estrada reported being kidnapped by a man with a grape knife. She said the man told her everything that he was going to do to her, but when they arrived in a remote location, Estrada was able to fight with the man. During the altercation, the man slashed her throat. She was able to escape and survive the encounter.

=== Sharlene Fowler ===
After nearly three years, another rape-murder occurred on July 14, 1998. The body of 30-year-old Sharlene Fowler was found in an orchard. An autopsy concluded that Fowler had been strangled to death.

=== Tamara Hernandez ===
In 1998, 22-year-old Tamara Jones Hernandez arrived in Madera to visit family, having come from Eureka, California. On the night of November 22, Hernandez left the family home to buy milk for the children. She never arrived home that night, and later that night her body was found face down in area near Road 23 1/2 and Avenue 15 1/2.

== Arrest ==
In 1999, Guerrero was arrested for drunk driving. He was later given a prison sentence which would have lasted him at least five years. During his incarceration at Wasco State Prison, Guerrero was overheard bragging about committing multiple violent crimes, including at least three murders. In 2004, shortly before his scheduled release from prison, Guerrero submitted a sample of his DNA to the state's crime lab. In October of that year, the DNA sample confirmed his responsibility in Hernandez' murder. Following this, he was arrested at his jail cell and later charged with the murder. He was extradited to Madera County, where the following year he was charged with the murders of Woodley and Fowler, along with the attempted murder of Estrada. He was linked to these crimes via DNA.

== Trial and imprisonment ==
Guerrero was ruled competent to trial in March 2009. He went to trial the following month; it was the most high-profile case to be prosecuted in Madera County since the 1976 Chowchilla kidnapping. The trial lasted ten days, and Guerrero was convicted of three counts of first-degree murder and one count of attempted murder. The victims' families stated that, while they were thankful that he was convicted, they did not want Guerrero to be sentenced to death. Estrada also stated that she did not believe he should be killed. In June 2009, Guerrero was sentenced to death. Guerrero was then transferred to San Quentin State Prison to await execution. In 2019, California governor Gavin Newsom imposed a moratorium which halted all scheduled all executions in the state, so as of today Guerrero is still on death row.

== See also ==
- List of death row inmates in the United States
- List of serial killers in the United States
