= List of programs broadcast by Investigation Discovery =

List of true crime television series

Investigation Discovery (ID) is a channel dedicated to true crime documentaries that launched in 2008. Most of ID's programs are original productions. It also airs re-titled off-network reruns, including ABC's 20/20, CBS's 48 Hours, and NBC's Dateline.

On June 7, 2015, ID aired its first ever scripted mini-series: Serial Thriller: Angel of Decay chronicled the investigation of the late Ted Bundy, a convicted serial killer who was executed for his crimes. A second installment, Serial Thriller: The Chameleon, premiered as a two-part miniseries in December 2015, chronicling the crimes of Stephen Morin. A third installment, Serial Thriller: The Headhunter, about Edmund Kemper, premiered on February 20, 2016.

== Current programming ==
- 911: Did the Killer Call? (2025–present)
- A Body in the Basement (2023–present)
- A Killer Among Friends (2025–present)
- American Detective with Lt. Joe Kenda (2022–present)
- American Monster (2016–present)
- American Monster: Abuse of Power (2025–present)
- Bodies in the Water (2026–present)
- Body Cam (2018–present)
- Deadly Influence: The Social Media Murders (2024–present)
- Deadly Women 2.0 (2026–present)
- Deadly Women: Fatal Instincts (2022, 2026–present)
- Evil Lives Here (2016–present)
- Evil Lives Here: My Child the Killer (2026–present)
- Fatal Love (2026–present)
- Feds (2023, 2026–present)
- Game Day Murders (2026–present)
- Hollywood Demons (2025–present)
- Hunt for the Missing: Chicago (2026–present)
- Killer Confessions: Case Files of a Texas Ranger (2026–present)
- Lethally Blonde (2024–present)
- Married to Evil (2023–24, 2026–present)
- Mother, May I Murder? (2023–present)
- The Murder Tapes (2019–present)
- Murder University (2026–present)
- On the Case with Paula Zahn (2009–present)
- People Magazine Investigates (2016–present)
- People Magazine Investigates: Surviving a Serial Killer (2024–present)
- Signs of a Psychopath (2020–present)
- The Curious Case Of... (2025–present)
- Toxic (2025–present)
- Who Hired the Hitman? (2025–present)

== Former programming ==
- The 1980s: The Deadliest Decade (2016–17)
- 1990s: The Deadliest Decade (2018–19)
- 50 Ways to Leave Your Lover (2013–14)
- A Checklist for Murder (2015)
- A Crime to Remember (2013–18)
- A Date with Death (2023)
- A Deadly Dose (2020)
- A Stranger in My Home (2013–16)
- A Time To Kill (2020–23)
- An American Murder Mystery (2016–20)
- Alaska: Ice Cold Killers (2012–17)
- All Access PD: Grand Rapids (2025)
- American Nightmare (2019)
- American Occult (2010)
- Atlanta Justice (2020–21)
- Bad Blood (2015–17)
- Bad Teachers (2014)
- The Bakersfield 3: A Tale of Murder and Motherhood (2025)
- Bail Jumpers (2024)
- Barbara Walters presents American Scandals (2015–16)
- Beauty Queen Murders (2013–14)
- Before I Die (2019)
- Before They Kill Again (2024)
- Behind Mansion Walls (2011–13)
- Betrayed (2016–20)
- Big Girls Wanted: Escaping Pearadise (2026)
- Big Law: Deputy Butterbean (2011)
- Black Widows: Kiss, Marry, Kill (2022)
- Blood Relations (2022–23)
- Blood Relatives (2012–17)
- Blood Runs Cold (2018)
- Blood, Lies, and Alibis (2013–14)
- Bloodlands (2014)
- Bodies in the Wilderness (2024)
- Body Cam: On the Scene (2022–25)
- Boy Band Confidential: A Hollywood Demons Event (2026)
- Breaking Homicide (2018–19)
- Breaking Point (2015)
- Bride Killa (2018)
- Broken Trust (2018)
- The Bureau (2009–10)
- Cabin in the Woods (2024)
- Call 911 (2008–09)
- Calls from the Inside (2021–23)
- The Case that Haunts Me (2018–20)
- Catch My Killer (2013)
- Caught in the Net (2022-23)
- Caught on Camera: The Untold Stories (2019)
- Cell Block Psychic (2014)
- Chaos in Court (2020–22)
- Chasing Justice with Dan Abrams (2010–11)
- Cold Blood (2008–12)
- Cold Hearted (2018)
- The Coroner: I Speak for the Dead (2016–18)
- Crimefeed (2023-24)
- Crime Scene Confidential (2022-23)
- Crime Scene University (2008)
- Crimes Gone Viral (2020–24)
- Crimes Gone Viral: Eyewitness (2022)
- The Crimes that Changed Us (2020)
- Cry Wolfe (2014–16)
- Cuff Me If You Can (2011)
- The Curious Case of Natalia Grace (2023–25)
- Dallas DNA (2009)
- Dangerous Persuasions (2013–15)
- Dark Minds (2012–14)
- Dark Side Of (2019)
- Dark Temptations (2014)
- Dark Waters: Murder In the Deep (2018–19)
- Dates from Hell (2012–14)
- Dead Days of Summer (2022)
- Dead North (2018)
- Dead Reckoning (2020)
- Dead Silent (2016–21)
- Dead of Night (2013–14; 2018–19)
- Dead of Winter (2019–20)
- Dead on Arrival (2014)
- The Deadliest Decade (2016–19)
- Deadline: Crime with Tamron Hall (2013–17; 2019)
- Deadly Affairs (2012–14)
- Deadly Affairs: Betrayed by Love (2021–23)
- Deadly Deception (2018–19)
- Deadly Demands (2016)
- Deadly Dentists (2017)
- Deadly Devotion (2013–15)
- Deadly Doctors (2016)
- Deadly Legacy (2018)
- Deadly Honeymoons (2023)
- Deadly Recall (2019–20)
- Deadly Secrets (2019)
- Deadly Sins (2012–17)
- Deadly Sins: No Forgiveness (2022–23)
- Deadly Women (2005–21)
- Death by Fame (2023–25)
- Death by Gossip with Wendy Williams (2015)
- Death in the Deep South (2023)
- Desperate Measures (2013)
- Detective (2017)
- Detective Diaries (2021)
- The Detectives Club: New Orleans (2017)
- Devil Among Us (2020)
- Devil in Suburbia (2022)
- Devil in the Details (2014)
- Devil in the Web (2022)
- The Devil Speaks (2018–19)
- The Devil You Know (2011–13)
- Diabolical (2018–20)
- Did He Do It? (2015)
- Dirty Little Lies (2012)
- Disappeared (2010–18, 2022–23)
- Do Not Disturb: Hotel Horrors (2015)
- Does Murder Sleep? (2023)
- Double Cross (2013)
- Dream Killer (2016)
- Elder Skelter (2013)
- Evil-in-Law (2013–14)
- Evil, I (2012–13)
- Evil Kin (2013–16)
- Evil Lives Here: The Killer Speaks (2023–25)
- Evil Lives Here: Shadows of Death (2020–24)
- Evil Stepmothers (2016–18)
- Evil Talks: Chilling Confessions (2018)
- Evil Twins (2012–18)
- Exposed: Naked Crimes (2023–25)
- Extreme Forensics (2008–10)
- Extreme Measures (2018–19)
- The Face of Evil (2019)
- Facing Evil with Candice DeLong (2010–15)
- The Family I Had (2017)
- Family of Darkness (2023)
- Fatal Affairs (2024)
- Fatal Destination (2025)
- Fatal Encounters (2012–13)
- Fatal Vows (2012–2020)
- Fatal Vows: Lethal Love Triangle (2024)
- Fatal Vows: Twisted Desires (2025)
- Fear Thy Neighbor (2014–24)
- FBI: Criminal Pursuit (2011–13)
- Fear Thy Roommate (2020–21)
- Feuds Turned Fatal (2024)
- Final Cut (2012)
- Final Vision (2017)
- Forbidden (2013)
- Forbidden: Dying for Love (2016–19)
- Forensic Files II (2023; moved from HLN)
- Forensics: You Decide (2009)
- Frenemies: Loyalty Turned Lethal (2013–14)
- The Friday the 13th Murders (2025)
- Gang Nation (2009)
- The Golden State Killer: It's Not Over (2018)
- Gone (2017)
- Good Cop, Bad Cop (2023)
- Grave Mysteries (2017–19)
- Grave Secrets (2016–18)
- Guilty Rich (2017)
- Handsome Devils (2014)
- Happily Never After (2012–14)
- Hardcover Mysteries (2010)
- Hate In America (2016)
- He Lied About Everything (2018)
- Hear No Evil (2017)
- Heartbreakers (2014)
- Heart of Darkness (2019)
- Hell House (2015)
- High Speed Chase (2023-24)
- Highway to Hell (2019)
- Home Alone (2017–18)
- Home Sweet Homicide (2019)
- Hometown Homicide (2019–20)
- Hometown Homicide: Local Mysteries (2020)
- Homicide Hunter (2011–20)
- Homicide Hunter: Hot on the Trail (2022)
- Homicide City (2018–20)
- Homicide City: Charlotte (2019–20)
- Hookers: Saved on the Strip (2010)
- Horror at the Cecil Hotel (2017)
- Hostage 911 (2023)
- Hostage: Do or Die (2011–12)
- House of Horrors: Kidnapped (2014–16)
- How (Not) To Get Rid of a Body (2024)
- How (Not) to Kill Your Husband (2014–16)
- I (Almost) Got Away with It (2010–16)
- I (Almost) Got Away With It: Confessions (2022)
- I Am Homicide (2016–17)
- I Didn't Do It (2011–12)
- I Escaped: Real Prison Breaks (2010–11)
- I Married a Mobster (2011–12)
- I Went Undercover (2022)
- I, Witness (2017)
- ID Breaking Now (2020)
- I'd Kill for You (2013–16)
- If I Should Die (2020)
- Impact of Murder (2019–20)
- Impostors (2014)
- In Plain Sight (2018–19)
- In Pursuit with John Walsh (2019–24)
- Indecent Proposal (2015)
- The Injustice Files (2011–14)
- Inside Homicide (2014)
- The Interrogator (2019)
- In the Line of Fire (2016)
- James Ellroy's LA: City of Demons (2011)
- Jared from Subway: Catching a Monster (2023)
- Joe Exotic: Tigers, Lies and Cover-Up (2020)
- Judgement Day: Prison or Parole? (2016)
- Karma's a B*tch (2013–14)
- Keith Morrison Investigates (2017–20)
- Ken and Barbie Killers: The Lost Murder Tapes (2021)
- Killer Attraction (2023)
- The Killer Beside Me (2018–20)
- Killer Bods (2020)
- Killer Carnies (2020)
- Killer Cheer (2023)
- Killer Clergy (2016)
- The Killer Closer (2018)
- Killer Confessions (2015)
- Killer in Paradise (2023)
- Killer in Question (2020)
- Killer Instinct with Chris Hansen (2015–17)
- The Killer Nanny (2022)
- Killer Trials: Judgment Day (2012)
- Killer Truckers (2013)
- Killer Unknown (2018)
- Killing Fields (2016–17)
- Killing Women with Piers Morgan (2016–17)
- The Killing Hour (2015)
- Killing Richard Glossip (2017)
- Killing Time (2019)
- Kiss of Death (2017)
- The Lake Erie Murders (2018–20)
- The Last 24 (2018–19)
- Last Seen Alive (2014)
- Late Night Lockup (2023–24)
- Let Us Prey: A Ministry of Scandals (2023)
- The Lies That Bind (2019)
- Living a Nightmare (2020)
- Lone Star Justice (2019)
- Lone Star Murders (2023)
- Lost Women of Alaska (2026)
- Lost Women of Highway 20 (2023)
- Love & Hate Crime (2018–19)
- Love, Honor & Betray (2021)
- Love Kills (2017)
- Love the Way You Lie (2014)
- Love You to Death (2022)
- Mail Order Murder (2014–15)
- Main Street Mysteries (2010–11)
- Man with a Van (2020)
- The Many Lives of Benjaman Kyle (2026)
- Married With Secrets (2016–18)
- Mary Kay Letourneau: Notes on a Scandal (2022)
- Mansions & Murders (2015)
- March to Justice (2013)
- Mean Girl Murders (2023–25)
- Mind of a Monster (2019–21)
- The Mind of a Murderer (2015–16)
- The Missing (2020)
- Momsters: When Moms Go Bad (2014–15)
- Most Evil (2014–15)
- Most Infamous (2014–15)
- Most Likely To... (2013)
- Motives & Murder: Cracking the Case (2012–17)
- Murdaugh Murders: Deadly Dynasty (2022)
- Murder & Basketball (2023)
- Murder Among Friends (2016–17)
- Murder at the Cabin (2023)
- Murder Board (2019)
- Murder Book (2014–16)
- Murder by Numbers (2017–18)
- Murder Calls (2017–18)
- The Murder Castle (2017)
- Murder Chose Me (2017–19)
- Murder Comes Home (2020)
- Murder Comes to Town (2014–18)
- Murder Decoded (2019)
- Murder in Amish Country (2019)
- Murder in My House (2023)
- Murder in Paradise (2013–14)
- Murder in the Big Apple (2023)
- Murder in the Heartland (2017–24)
- Murder in the Wicked West (2022–23)
- Murder Is Forever (2018)
- Murder Loves Company (2019)
- Murder U (2014)
- Murder Under the Friday Night Lights (2022–25)
- My Dirty Little Secret (2013–15)
- My Family's Deadly Secret (2020)
- My Murder Story (2020)
- My Strange Criminal Addiction (2014)
- Mystery Files (2010)
- Never Say Goodbye (2019)
- The Night That Didn't End (2018–20)
- Nightmare Next Door (2011–16)
- No One Can Hear You Scream (2022)
- Nothing Personal (2011–12)
- Nowhere to Hide (2014–15)
- O.J. Simpson Trial: The Real Story (April 1, 2016)
- O.J.: Trial of the Century (June 12, 2014)
- The Object of Murder (2019)
- Obsession: Dark Desires (2014–17)
- On Death Row (2012–13)
- Operation Undercover (2024)
- Over My Dead Body (2015)
- Pandora's Box: Unleashing Evil (2016–18)
- Paradise Lost (2016)
- Passport to Murder (2016)
- People Magazine Investigates: Crimes of Fashion (2018)
- People Magazine Investigates: Cults (2018–19)
- People Magazine Presents: Crimes of the '90s (2022, 2025)
- People Magazine Presents: Crimes of the '2000s (2023)
- People Magazine Presents: Crimes of the '2010s (2024)
- The Perfect Murder (2014–18)
- The Perfect Suspect (2017–18)
- The Playboy Murders (2023–25)
- Poisoned Passions (2013)
- Power of Attorney: Don Worley (2021)
- Predator at Large (2020)
- Pretty Bad Girls (2012–13)
- Pretty Dangerous (2013)
- The Price of Glee (2023)
- Primal Instinct (2018–19)
- Prison Wives (2010)
- Quiet on Set: The Dark Side of Kids TV (2024)
- Raw Terror (2020)
- Real Detective (2016–17)
- Real Interrogations (2008)
- The Real Murders on Elm Street (2024–25)
- Real NCIS (2009)
- Real PD: Kansas City (2021–23)
- The Real Story with María Elena Salinas (2017–18)
- Real Time Crime (2022–24)
- Real Vice Miami (2012)
- Reasonable Doubt (2017–22)
- Redrum (2013–15)
- Reel Crime/Real Story (2012)
- Relatively Evil (2019)
- Residential Rage (2024)
- Road Rage (2023–25)
- Ruby & Jodi: A Cult of Sin and Influence (2025)
- Scene of the Crime with Tony Harris (2017–18)
- Scorned: Fatal Fury (2022–23)
- Scorned: Love Kills (2012–16)
- Secret Lives of Stepford Wives (2014)
- See No Evil (2015–25)
- Secrets of the Morgue (2018–19)
- Seduced to Slay (2023-24)
- Serial Killer: Devil Unchained (2019)
- Serial Thriller (2015–16)
- Sex & Murder (2023; moved from HLN)
- Sex Sent Me to the Slammer (2015)
- The Shadows of Death (2019)
- Shadow of Doubt (2016–17)
- Shattered (2017–19)
- Sherri Papini: Caught in the Lie (2025)
- The Shift (2008–10)
- Sins and Secrets (2011–13)
- Sins of the Father (2022–23)
- Sinister Ministers (2014)
- Sin City Justice (2016–17)
- Six Degrees of Murder (2016–17)
- Solved (2008–10)
- Someone You Thought You Knew (2018–19)
- Son of Sam: The Hunt for a Killer (2017)
- Southern Fried Homicide (2013–15)
- Southern Gothic (2020)
- Southwest of Salem (2016)
- Stalked: Followed by Fear (2021)
- Stalked: Someone's Watching (2011–14)
- Still A Mystery (2019–23)
- Stolen Voices, Buried Secrets (2011–12)
- Stranger Among Us (2020)
- Street Justice: The Bronx (2017)
- Sugar Town (2018)
- Surviving Evil (2013–16)
- Suspicion (2015–16)
- Suspicious Minds (2020)
- Swamp Murders (2013–17)
- Tabloid (2015–16)
- Tamron Hall Investigates (2017)
- The Tech Bro Murders (2025)
- The Vanishing Women (2016)
- The Will (2009–13)
- Til Death Do Us Part (2019–21)
- To Catch A Killer (2018)
- Too Pretty to Live (2016)
- Torn from the Headlines: New York Post Reports (2020)
- True Crime with Aphrodite Jones (2011–16)
- True Conviction (2018–22)
- True Grime: Crime Scene Clean Up (2011)
- True Nightmares (2015–16)
- True Nightmares: Tales of Terror (2021)
- Truth About Murder with Sunny Hostin (2019)
- Truth Is Stranger Than Florida (2016)
- Twisted (2010–14)
- Twisted Love (2020)
- Twisted Sisters (2018–20)
- Twisted Tales of 9 to 5 (2015)
- Two Shallow Graves (2022)
- Unbreakable: Live to Tell (2019)
- Undercover Underage (2021—23)
- Unmasked (2018)
- Unraveled (2015–16)
- Until Proven Innocent (2016)
- Untouchable: Power Corrupts (2015)
- Unusual Suspects (2010–16)
- Unusual Suspects: Deadly Intent (2017–2018)
- Valley of the Damned (2019)
- Vanished Into Thin Air (2022)
- Vanity Fair Confidential (2015–18)
- Very Bad Men (2010–14)
- Very Scary People (2023–25; moved from HLN)
- Village of the Damned: Welcome to Dryden (2017)
- We Are Jeni (2026)
- Web of Lies (2014–2019)
- Welcome to Murdertown (2018)
- What's Your Emergency? (2022)
- What Lies Beneath (2018)
- Where Murder Lies (2021–22)
- Who Killed...? (2020)
- Who Killed Biggie and Tupac? (2022)
- Who Killed Jane Doe? (2017–18)
- Who the (Bleep)... (2013)
- Who the (Bleep) Did I Marry? (2010–15, 2022–24)
- Wicked Attraction (2008–13)
- The Wives Did It (2015)
- Wives with Knives (2012–17)
- Women in Prison (2015–16)
- The Wonderland Murders (2018–19)
- Worst Thing I Ever Did (2014)
- Young, Hot & Crooked (2014)
- Your Number's Up (2016)
- Your Worst Nightmare (2014–20)

== Reruns ==
- 20/20 on ID
- 48 Hours on ID
- Dateline on ID
