= Daniel Wozniak (murderer) =

American convicted of murder on death row

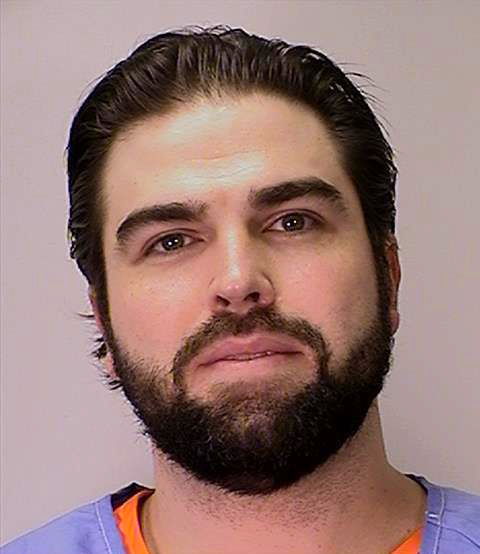
- 2016 mugshot
- Born: Daniel Patrick Wozniak; March 23, 1984 (age 42); Long Beach, California, U.S.
- Status: Incarcerated
- Conviction: First-degree murder with special circumstances (2 counts)
- Penalty: Death (September 23, 2016); commuted to life imprisonment without the possibility of parole (November 5, 2026)

Details
- Victims: 2
- Date: May 21, 2010
- Country: United States
- State: California
- Date apprehended: May 26, 2010
- Imprisoned at: California Medical Facility

Daniel Patrick "Danny" Wozniak (born March 23, 1984) is an American convicted murderer and former stage actor. Wozniak was convicted of two counts of murder in September 2016. In May 2010, Wozniak killed his neighbor and friend, Private First Class Samuel Eliezer "Sam" Herr, and Herr's friend, Juri "Julie" Kibuishi, as part of a plan to frame Herr for Kibuishi's murder and steal his combat pay. Wozniak was deeply in debt and wanted money to finance his upcoming wedding and honeymoon. Wozniak and his then-fiancée, Rachel Mae Buffett, lived in the same apartment complex as Herr in Costa Mesa, California.

After more than five years of court proceedings, Wozniak went to trial and was convicted on two counts of first-degree murder. He was found guilty and sentenced to death in September 2016. He was incarcerated at California's San Quentin State Prison until July 2021, when he was moved to Salinas Valley State Prison as part of the Condemned Inmate Transfer Pilot Program. On November 5, 2026, his death sentence was commuted to life imprisonment without parole.

== Crimes and cover-up ==
On May 21, 2010, Wozniak shot and killed his neighbor, Private First Class Samuel "Sam" Herr, a 26-year-old Afghanistan War veteran, at a Los Alamitos theater. At the time of the murders, Wozniak was deeply in debt and unemployed but planning a lavish wedding and honeymoon. After Herr told him that he had savings of about $62,000 from combat pay, Wozniak decided to kill him in order to acquire the money.

In an effort to misdirect police and cast blame upon Herr, Wozniak then used Herr's cell phone to text Juri "Julie" Kibuishi, a 23-year-old college student who had been tutoring Herr at Orange Coast College. Wozniak lured Kibuishi to Herr's apartment, where he shot and killed her. Wozniak then staged the crime scene to make it appear as though Kibuishi had been sexually assaulted, suggesting that Herr had committed her assault and subsequent murder and then gone on the run. The same evening, Wozniak went on to perform in his local theatre production of the musical Nine. Afterwards, Wozniak dismembered Herr's body by removing his limbs and head, leaving the torso in the attic of the theater.

An extensive manhunt for Herr was launched by authorities who at that point still believed Herr was responsible for Kibuishi's murder and was on the run. Wozniak came under suspicion after he instructed a seventeen-year-old, Wesley Freilich, to withdraw money from Herr's accounts. When the police confronted the boy, he told them that Wozniak had asked him to withdraw the money for him.

Soon after, Wozniak was apprehended by US Marshals while at his bachelor party two days before his wedding.

After repeatedly lying to police, Wozniak finally confessed. Wozniak led authorities to the area where almost all of Herr's dismembered body was found discarded at El Dorado Nature Center in Long Beach. After more than five years of court proceedings, Wozniak went to trial and was convicted on two counts of first-degree murder. On September 23, 2016, he was sentenced to death.

== Incarceration ==
Wozniak was imprisoned at San Quentin State Prison until July 13, 2021, when he was transferred to Salinas Valley State Prison as part of the Condemned Inmate Transfer Pilot Program. His death sentence was commuted to life imprisonment without parole on November 5, 2026, when Gavin Newsom commuted all of California’s death row inmates sentences.

== Imprisonment of Buffett ==
In November 2012, Wozniak's then-fiancée, Rachel Mae Buffett, was arrested and charged with three felony counts of accessory-after-the-fact based on allegations that she had lied multiple times to police investigators.

On September 12, 2018, Buffett was convicted on two of those counts with a maximum possible sentence of 44 months and, on November 8, 2018, was sentenced to 32 months minus time served and good behavior. She was released from jail sometime in 2019.

== In popular culture ==
The case has been covered by numerous crime and news programs in the United States, including:

External videos
- Dr. Phil: Was She an Accomplice to Murder? (part 1)
- Crime Watch Daily: Community Actor Kills Veteran, Student For Money To Bankroll Honeymoon (part 1)
- The Perfect Murder: Curtain Call
- 48 Hours: "Killer Performance"

- Dr. Phil ("Actress Accused: Was She an Accessory to Murder?", first aired February 5, 2013). During the show, Samuel's father, Steve Herr, showed resentment toward Rachel Buffett, Wozniak's then-fiancée, and her claims of not knowing anything about the murders. Buffett was later sentenced to 32 months in prison.
- Lockup (MSNBC, "Lockup Orange County: Extended Stay: Unholy Trinity"). The episode was filmed in the Orange County Jail and featured an interview with Wozniak as he proclaimed his innocence. The episode outraged the relatives of Wozniak's victims, who said he charmed the camera and proclaimed his devotion to the Bible and the two people he killed.
- Dateline NBC ("Plot Twist", first aired January 15, 2016; "Final Curtain," first aired November 30, 2018; "Plot Twist" repackaged and shown on Dateline: Secrets Uncovered, a part of Oxygen, aired July 5, 2019). Buffett was interviewed by reporter Josh Mankiewicz about her part in the murder investigation.
- 20/20 (ABC, "Mystery in Apartment 410" first aired March 4, 2016). Reported on the May 2010 murders.
- Crime Watch Daily (first aired June 8, 2016): Profiled the case.
- The Perfect Murder (Investigation Discovery, "Curtain Call," first aired August 24, 2016). Reported on the case.
- CBS' 48 Hours ("Killer Performance," first aired October 9, 2016). Correspondent Tracy Smith interviewed friends and family members of the victims, as well as the case prosecutor and other public officials.
- Unusual Suspects: Deadly Intent (Investigation Discovery, "Final Curtain," first aired November 1, 2017). Reported on the case and depicted Wozniak as an unassuming killer.
- My Favorite Murder ("Live at The Grove in Anaheim," first aired November 2, 2017). Karen Kilgariff tells the story of "killer Daniel Wozniak."
- In Ice Cold Blood (Oxygen, "Closing Night"). Profile of the case.
- 20/20 (ABC, "The Final Act" first aired May 31, 2019).
- Casefile ("Case 195: The Costa Mesa Murders")
- Crime Junkie ("MURDERED: Julie Kibuishi and Sam Herr")
- Sword and Scale, Episode 164.
- The Web Crawlers podcast discuss Wozniak and interview Amanda Lund, who performed at the same community theater as him. This fact was later referenced by Lund's husband, Matt Gourley, on the 2020 Summer S'mores with Conan and the Chill Chums 5 episode of the Conan O'Brien Needs a Friend podcast.
- The Casual Criminalist podcast ("The Costa Mesa Manhunt: The Man Who Thought He Could Get Away with Murder")

Additional pop culture references:

- The song "Killer," from Eminem's 2020 album Music to Be Murdered By – Side B (Deluxe Edition), references Wozniak.

== See also ==
- List of homicides in California
- Capital punishment in California
- List of death row inmates in the United States
