= Custom Nation =

Book by Anthony Flynn

Custom Nation: Why Customization Is the Future of Business and How to Profit from it
- Paperback edition
- Author: Anthony Flynn, Emily Flynn Vencat
- Language: English
- Genre: Non-fiction
- Publisher: BenBella Books
- Publication date: November 15, 2012
- Publication place: United States
- Media type: Paperback
- Pages: 224 pp.
- ISBN: 1-937-85610-0

Custom Nation is a nonfiction book written by Anthony Flynn and Emily Flynn Vencat, published on November 15, 2012 by BenBella Books. The text examines the prevalence and significance of product customization in today's market, especially in regard to Culture of United states. The book's full title is Custom Nation: Why Customization Is the Future of Business and How to Profit from it.

== Background ==
The book was written by Anthony Flynn, the co-founder of YouBar, a custom energy bar company, together with his sister, Emily Flynn Vencat, a journalist.

The book was published on November 15, 2012 by BenBella Books. The book is 224 pages in length.

== Plot ==
Custom Nation examines the trend in today's market towards customizable products. It looks at Vistaprint, Shutterfly, Zazzle, CafePress, Starbucks, Dell, Subway, and other companies whose business concepts depend on customization.

Custom Nation includes chapters on mass production, the inception of customization, advice on how to launch a customization-based business, advice on how to add customization to an existing business, and methods to grow and market a customization business.

== Awards ==
Custom Nation is ranked well on a various best-seller lists. The book was ranked #8 on the New York Times Best Seller list in early December 2012. USA Today ranked Custom Nation #94 on its Best seller list. Publishers Weekly ranked Custom Nation #12 on its Bestsellers list. Custom Nation was ranked #78 in Amazon.com's Management and Leadership category, sub listed under Planning and Forecasting.

Publishers Weekly reviewed the book in September 2012, writing that Custom Nation was an excellent instruction manual for businesses looking to use customized products to grow further.
