= Chima Simone =

American television personality

Chima Simone Benson
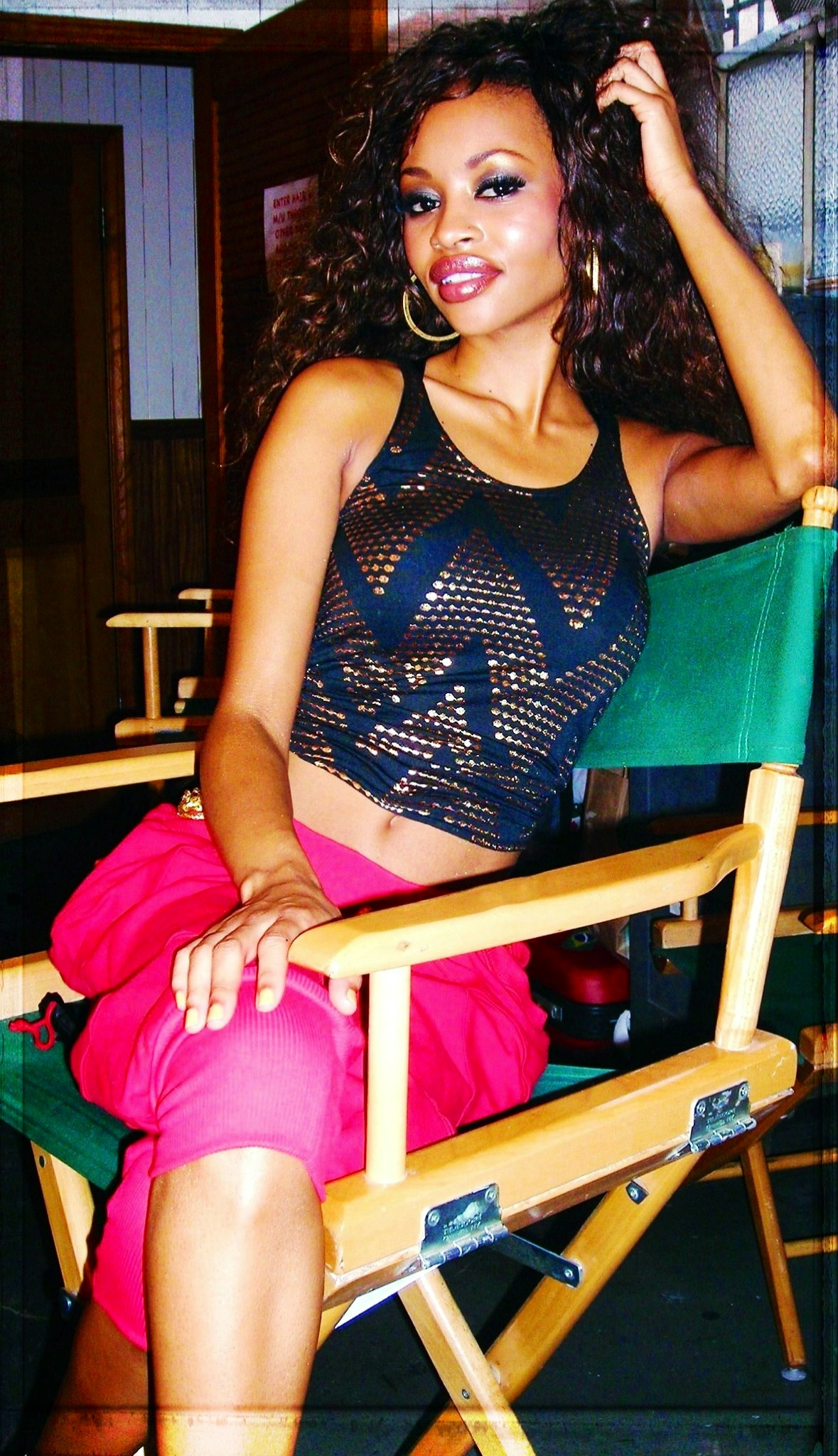
- Simone in 2013
- Born: Chima Simone Benson; July 28, 1976 (age 50)
- Education: University of Southern California (M.A., Specialized Journalism)
- Occupations: Entertainment reporter; Television Personality
- Website: www.chimasimone.com

Chima Simone Benson (born July 28, 1976) is an American TV personality and freelance journalist, best known as a former reality show contestant from Big Brother 11. She is also notable for surviving an attack by the Bathtub Killer, Dale Devon Scheanette. Her story was recounted in the true crime cable television show Cold Case Files and again in the documentary shows Unusual Suspects and Surviving Evil on Investigation Discovery. Most recently, Simone was featured on "Dateline NBC" in an episode entitled, “Dark Intentions,” which delves further into the case involving the “Bathtub Killer.

== Early life ==
Chima Simone Benson was born on July 28, 1976. She pursued her undergraduate studies at The University of Texas at Arlington in Arlington, Texas, where she joined Alpha Kappa Alpha sorority. She is a survivor of Dale Devon Scheanette, also known as the "Bathtub Killer," who attacked her on campus at her sorority house. He also sexually assaulted many women and killed two other women (Christine Vu and Wendie Prescott) in the Arlington-Fort Worth area. Scheanette was convicted of capital murder and executed in 2009.

== Career ==
Simone has been a journalist for several television networks, including BET, MTV and The CW. She has also been a backstage interviewer for the BET Awards. Simone worked as an entertainment reporter with the Hollyscoop Show, a celebrity news television series and website. The nationally syndicated show, which debuted Sunday, August 30, 2009, on KTLA, is based on the website of the same name. She also covered season 11 of Big Brother and season 4 of The Real Housewives of Atlanta for entertainment news website The Wrap, syndicated on MSN. She continues to cover entertainment for various outlets, including E! Online.

=== Big Brother ===
Simone was a contestant on the eleventh season of the American version of the reality show Big Brother where she competed as part of the Brains Clique. Former cast member, Marcellas Reynolds, helped Simone bypass the initial phases of the audition process. She was cast, despite having numerous television appearances prior.

Midway through the show on day 42, Simone was expelled by producers, who stated that Simone had violated several of show's rules, including refusing to wear her microphone and later destroying her microphone by throwing it into the jacuzzi. Simone disputed the allegations in several statements issued upon her departure, maintaining she quit a game, and could not win due to producer manipulation. The broadcast of Simone's departure delivered Big Brother’s largest audience since 2008 and highest ratings in all key demos on any night that summer (highest adult 18-49 rating since the 8th edition finale in 2007).

Chima Simone's ratings topping drama earned her a spot on People Magazine's "Reality TV's 10 Best Catfights & Meltdowns". Simone was also included in Yahoo! TVs "Top 10 Reality Moments of 2009".

Simone continues to be featured in roundups of previous seasons. People Magazine's countdown to the reality competition show's milestone 25th season counted Simone's exit as one of the wildest moments in the history of Big Brother.

=== Awards ===
Simone was nominated in the best Best Villain category at the Fox Reality Really Awards. She attended and was accompanied by Romain Chavent (2009)

== Personal life ==
Simone and her husband, Jonathan Olmstead, welcomed their daughter into their lives in 2018.
