= Unusual Suspects: Deadly Intent =

American TV documentary program (2017–18)

- Genre: Documentary
- Narrated by: Jeff Wilburn
- Opening theme: Figure and Groove
- Country of origin: United States
- No. of seasons: 1
- No. of episodes: 13

Production
- Executive producers: Mike Mathis; Brian Puterman; Stacy Schneider
- Running time: 42 minutes
- Production companies: Mike Mathis Productions, Inc.

Original release
- Network: Investigation Discovery
- Release: October 4, 2017 – January 10, 2018

Related
- Unusual Suspects

Unusual Suspects: Deadly Intent is an American television documentary program on Investigation Discovery. The series, which ran for one season, debuted on October 4, 2017 and ended in January 2018. It served as a sequel to Unusual Suspects. Like its predecessor, the new program also showcases the intricate investigations that led to the arrest of unusual killers – people who most of the time never even had a police record – and how those cases were complicated and challenging even for experienced people working in law enforcement.

== Production ==
In 2016, LMNO Cable Group, the company responsible for producing Unusual Suspects since its inception, accused Discovery of taking advantage of financial crimes to steal TLC's The Little Couple. The imbroglio resulted in Discovery cancelling all contracts with LMNO, including Unusual Suspects, on June 17, 2016.

Despite claims from some online sources that Deadly Intent is the ninth season of the cancelled Unusual Suspects, Investigation Discovery officially presents it on its website as a new program on its first season.

== Episodes ==
No.	Title	Original release date
1	"Field of Nightmares"	October 4, 2017
On a summer day in Springfield, Illinois, an infant daughter left in a sweltering SUV is the only sign of a young mother that's gone missing. A frantic search leads to an eerie sight at the edge of town, and a killer who may have more secrets to expose.
2	"Snake in the Grass"	October 11, 2017
Police looking into the murders of a married team of sun-drenched Southern California entrepreneurs investigate whether the couple may have found out the hard way that no amount of money is worth losing sleep – or your life – over.
3	"Dance with the Devil"	October 18, 2017
Diane Zaleski have a thirst for fun, and take the plunge and buys a home close to her family in Union, New Jersey. The wrong houseguest will prove deadly though, as police dig through her life to find an enemy that is hiding very close.
4	"Nightcrawler"	October 25, 2017
In Summit Township, Michigan a mother is stabbed in her home in the middle of the night. Suspicion swirls around those close to her before a plot unravels to reveal how being in the wrong place at the wrong time can lead to paying the ultimate price.
5	"Final Curtain"	November 1, 2017
Costa Mesa, California is a beautiful place to live, but it comes at a cost. The murder of a young girl, Julie Kibushi, and the disappearance of a former Army soldier, Sam Herr, leads investigators down a dark path into the mind of an unassuming killer: Dan Wozniak
6	"Devil Went Down To Georgia"	November 8, 2017
A recent law graduate Lauren Giddings goes missing weeks before the bar exam. Family, friends and police collaborate to uncover the mystery of where she went, and who put her there. A revelation puts her inner circle under suspicion until the killer is revealed.
7	"Terror Under the Moonlight"	November 15, 2017
An unthinkable murder and miraculous story of survival take shape in a small Gulf Coast Texas town. A quiet night out between teenaged friends turns into every parent's nightmare when a killer stumbles upon his unsuspecting prey.
8	"Tangled Up in Red"	November 22, 2017
Kay Parsons is killed and her best friend Rebecca Sears is hospitalized in two separate attacks in a normally quiet Grovetown, Georgia. Investigators digging for the truth uncover connections that show some members of these two families were much closer than anyone thought.
9	"A Taste for Blood"	December 6, 2017
A young mother's body is found in the bath in what appears to be an accident. The evidence doesn't add up, however, and the case turns into a murder investigation. Two more victims are connected to the killer, who cops must catch before he strikes again.
10	"Down to the Wire"	December 13, 2017
A mother of three Adeline Wilford is stabbed in her own home of Easton, Maryland, in the middle of the day. Digging back through her life for motive, detectives are led to some unlikely suspects. It takes years, and one bold wiretap, to uncover what really happened to her.
11	"Fatal Impact"	December 20, 2017
Roberto Ayala is killed in what looks like an accident. The ATF, however, confirms this was no accident: it was a bomb with an intended target. Trying to misdirect police, the killer is eventually brought down with the help of a little sunlight.
12	"Shattered Dreams"	December 27, 2017
Charlie and Diane Parker is gunned down in their home in Conway, South Carolina. Evidence points to the couple's relatives, sending cops down a path that has dire results for a suspect. Police get the killer, but at a cost to everyone associated with the victims.
13	"Forget Me Not"	January 10, 2018
A teenage girl Rayna Rison has been missing for a month before she is found murdered in tranquil La Porte, Indiana. Dogged investigators spend 15 years searching for the victim's killer.
