= Killer Story =

2025 memoir by Claire St. Amant

Killer Story: The Truth Behind True Crime Television
- Author: Claire St. Amant
- Audio read by: Claire St. Amant
- Language: English
- Subject: True crime television production, investigative journalism, memoir
- Genre: Memoir
- Publisher: BenBella Books
- Publication date: February 18, 2025
- Publication place: United States
- Media type: Print (hardcover), audiobook
- Pages: 360
- ISBN: 978-1637746059

Killer Story: The Truth Behind True Crime Television is a 2025 memoir by American investigative journalist and former CBS News producer Claire St. Amant. The book provides a personal account of working as a producer for true crime television programs such as 48 Hours and 60 Minutes, detailing "the hustle, moral quandaries and psychic drain of turning tragedy into television."

== Background and content ==
St. Amant draws from her nearly decade-long career at CBS News, where she contributed to more than 20 episodes of 48 Hours and segments on 60 Minutes. The memoir covers her entry into the field, her recruitment by CBS, and the competitive nature of true crime production. Specific cases are also covered, such as the Parkland high school shooting, the murder of Chris Kyle, and interviews with serial killers such as Samuel Little.

The book explores the moral questions around sensationalizing tragedy and the psychological toll this takes on journalists. It also gives an insider perspective on industry practices like cold-calling sources, competing with rival shows, and pitching stories that are sometimes rejected. St. Amant narrates the audiobook edition herself.

== Publication ==
The book was published by BenBella Books (distributed by Simon & Schuster) on February 18, 2025, in hardcover and audiobook formats.

== Reception ==
The Dallas Morning News called it "compulsively readable," praising its exploration of the "hustle, moral quandaries, and psychic drain" of the genre. AudioFile Magazine noted its "momentum is enough to propel the listener forward," though suggested a professional narrator might enhance the audiobook.
