= Unusual Suspects (TV program) =

American TV documentary program (2010–2016)

- Genre: Documentary
- Narrated by: Mocean Melvin (2010); Jamie Hanes (2011–2016)
- Composer: Benson Taylor
- Country of origin: United States
- No. of seasons: 8
- No. of episodes: 102

Production
- Executive producers: Diana Sperrazza; Eric Schotz
- Running time: 40 to 44 minutes
- Production company: LMNO Productions

Original release
- Network: Investigation Discovery
- Release: June 21, 2010 – April 10, 2016

Related
- Unusual Suspects: Deadly Intent; Unusual Suspects: Welcome to ChildHorror

Unusual Suspects is an American television documentary program on Investigation Discovery. The program debuted on June 21, 2010. It showcases many of the most shocking and difficult cases in law enforcement history, and also sheds light on the investigations that led to the arrest of the culprits. On June 17, 2016, the show was cancelled after eight seasons, due to notices of termination by Discovery. In October 2017, a sequel returned to Investigation Discovery, Unusual Suspects: Deadly Intent; Investigation Discovery officially presents it on its website as a new production on its first season. A second sequel, Unusual Suspects: Welcome To ChildHorror, is in development with three seasons, as it resolves around Children killing their own parents.

== Episodes ==
=== Series overview ===
Season	Episodes	Originally released	
Season	Episodes	First released	Last released
1	13	June 21, 2010	September 6, 2010
2	11	August 14, 2011	October 23, 2011
3	13	February 26, 2012	May 27, 2012
4	13	September 9, 2012	December 9, 2012
5	13	March 31, 2013	June 30, 2013
6	13	January 12, 2014	April 27, 2014
7	13	January 4, 2015	April 5, 2015
8	13	January 10, 2016	April 10, 2016

=== Season 1 (2010) ===
No. overall	No. in season	Title	Original release date
1	1	"The Killer Nearby"	May 31, 2010
Murder of Bonnie Sanborn in Tucson, Arizona & the Murder of Aaron Iturra in Eugene, Oregon. Note: This episode was a "sneak peek" episode.
2	2	"Betrayal of Trust"	June 21, 2010
Murder of Cara Knott
3	3	"A Mother's Conviction"	June 28, 2010
October 13, 1997, 10-year-old Joel Kirkpatrick of Lawrenceville, Illinois, is stabbed to death by an intruder in the middle of the night. After an investigation in which numerous seemingly common suspects are considered, his mother, Julie Rae Harper is charged with the crime as the town is in disbelief. No one imagines she is capable of murder. She is convicted and sentenced to 65 years in prison. She appeals her conviction and the Innocence Project takes up her case, believing she could not have committed the crime. Serial killer Tommy Lynn Sells, who is on death row in Texas, then hints that he committed the crime. Lawrenceville prosecutors are not convinced, but others are. Many witnesses who attempted to come forward around the time of the crime but were ignored also speak up. These include a man who saw the suspect in a restaurant two days before the murder and thought his behavior was odd, and a bus ticket saleswoman who thought he matched the description on a composite sketch. A new trial is granted, and Harper is freed. Sells is never convicted of this particular murder, though he remains the prime suspect.
4	4	"Will To Murder"	July 5, 2010
A killer posing as a delivery man, guns down an affluent couple in their own home in Munster, Indiana. A recent victim of robbery is found shot to death in her car. Michael Harold Chapel
5	5	"Murder in Biloxi"	July 12, 2010
A judge and his wife are murdered in their Biloxi, Mississippi, home. In a city rife with corruption, the suspects range from common criminals to powerful politicians. Pete Halat
6	6	"Monster in Spokane"	July 19, 2010
A serial killer scares Spokane, Washington, by taking the lives of many people. The analysis of an old lead helps investigators solve the case. Robert Lee Yates
7	7	"Millionaire's Murder"	July 26, 2010
The murder of a wealthy widow sends shock waves through Madisonville, Kentucky. The victim's own records are the key to finding the killer.
8	8	"Missing Executive"	August 2, 2010
When high-ranking oil executive Sidney Reso is kidnapped from Morristown, New Jersey, an intensive manhunt turns up few clues.
9	9	"Burned"	August 9, 2010
A series of California fires puts investigators on the hunt for a serial arsonist. After years of dogged investigation, an unpopular theory points to a disturbing culprit: John Leonard Orr
10	10	"Lovers and Liars"	August 16, 2010
A young couple is gunned down in Macon, Georgia. A husband and wife are shot to death in Chicago.
11	11	"Overkill"	August 23, 2010
A serial killer targets the elderly woman in a geted community. Dana Sue Gray
12	12	"Happy Face Killer"	August 30, 2010
On January 22, 1990, Taunja Bennett, a mentally challenged young woman, is found strangled to death. An intense investigation produces no suspects. Then, out of the blue, a bizarre confession by Laverne Pavlinac is made and the case was closed even though the police found the story hard to believe Five years later, someone else claims responsibility for the crime and the murders of six other women. Keith Jesperson
13	13	"Cold-Blooded"	September 6, 2010
Murder of Denise Huber in Newport Beach, California & Murder of Larry Streeter in Bigfork, Montana

=== Season 2 (2011) ===
No. overall	No. in season	Title	Original release date
14	1	"Never Came Home"	August 14, 2011
In 1996, teenager Joey Martin leaves home through a bedroom window to join friends for beers and to catch a glimpse of a rare comet that was due to pass through the Northern sky, but he disappears. Police do not find any concrete leads up until 2008, when a new detective uncovers a shocking story.
15	2	"Getting Even"	August 21, 2011
Murder of Danny Paquette in Hooksett, New Hampshire
16	3	"Little Girl Lost"	August 28, 2011
Murder of Katie Collman in Crothersville, Indiana
17	4	"Who Wanted Them Dead?"	September 4, 2011
Murder of Susan Sutton in Coral Gables, Florida
18	5	"Hiding in Plain Sight"	September 11, 2011
An FBI office worker named Melissa Mooney is raped and strangled to death within days of moving into her new home. When her bitter ex-husband is cleared after appearing to be the most likely suspect, her co-workers in the Bureau persist and ultimately succeed in bringing her killer, someone who was right under their noses from the start of the investigation, to justice.
19	6	"Terror in Gulfport"	September 18, 2011
A young woman is raped and murdered in the home she shares with her live-in boyfriend. The killer turns out to be someone who made a living saving lives.
20	7	"Where's Becky"	September 25, 2011
Murder of Becky Stowe in Niles, Michigan
21	8	"Blood on the Badge"	October 2, 2011
Murder of policeman George Arthur
22	9	"Cop Killer"	October 9, 2011
On February 20, 1983, policeman Kirk Johnson from the San Diego Police Department is found dead inside his own police car. Initial evidence points to another policeman from the same department. Detectives investigate their own workmates until they get to the unusual suspect.
23	10	"Death of a Freshman"	October 16, 2011
Murder of Katherine Foster in Mobile, Alabama
24	11	"Murder in the Mansion"	October 23, 2011
Murder of Andrew Kissel

=== Season 3 (2012) ===
No. overall	No. in season	Title	Original release date
25	1	"The Perfect Family"	February 26, 2012
Haines family murders
26	2	"A Monstrous Act"	March 4, 2012
Murder of Missy Grubaugh
27	3	"Murder on Miguel Lane"	March 11, 2012
In 1985, the homicide of three Arlington, Texas, teens shocks the community.
28	4	"Innocent Bystander"	March 25, 2012
In 2002, a Brunswick, New York, couple are found murdered in their apartment.
29	5	"Clairemont Killer"	April 1, 2012
In 1990, the murders of six females put investigators on the trail of a vicious serial killer: Cleophus Prince Jr.
30	6	"Left For Dead"	April 8, 2012
Murder of Henry Caneva in Sarasota, Florida
31	7	"Murderous Intentions"	April 15, 2012
Murder of Robert Stanley in Lafayette, Louisiana
32	8	"Death of an Angel"	April 22, 2012
Murder of Angel Ormstrom in Mentor, Ohio
33	9	"Hotel Homicides"	April 29, 2012
Between 1993 and 1997 three women are murdered in three Des Moines, Iowa, hotels. Hampered by the sheer volume of suspects and the infancy of forensic testing, it takes years of dogged investigation to bring Donald Piper to justice.
34	10	"Elemental Murder"	May 6, 2012
George Trepal
35	11	"Deadly Denial"	May 13, 2012
Murder of Diane Snellen in Georgetown, Kentucky
36	12	"Random Act of Madness"	May 20, 2012
Murder of Billy Greenwood in Portland, Maine
37	13	"Bathtub Killer"	May 27, 2012
Dale Scheanette

=== Season 4 (2012) ===
No. overall	No. in season	Title	Original release date
38	1	"Pure Evil"	September 9, 2012
Murder of Nanette Krenzel
39	2	"The Perfect Suspect"	September 16, 2012
Charles Ray Vines
40	3	"Wolf in Sheep's Clothing"	September 23, 2012
In 1995, 8-year-old Maria Piceno of Lemoore, California, is abducted near her home.
41	4	"Blood Trail"	September 30, 2012
In 1999, Theresa Wesolowski of Germantown, Wisconsin, is found murdered.
42	5	"Mother's Day Murders"	October 7, 2012
In 1985, three members of the Eastburn family are viciously murdered in their home
43	6	"Gruesome Discovery"	October 14, 2012
In 1994, the brutalized body of a young mother is found in a 55-gallon trash barrel. Initial leads point to a possible love triangle, and the possibility that the obsession of one of her coworkers just went too far. When the shocking truth is untangled, a vicious killer faces final justice.
44	7	"A Bike Ride to Murder"	October 21, 2012
In 1991, the brutalized body of a San Diego girl is found in a weed-choked canyon.
45	8	"Murder on the Menu"	October 28, 2012
April 2004, the dismembered body of a chef is found in trash bags along a highway near Danbury, Connecticut.
46	9	"Triple Threat"	November 11, 2012
June 1993, a Port Hueneme, California, mother-of-two is found strangled in her home. Was she silenced by her estranged husband? An obsessed coworker? A fledgling serial killer?
47	10	"City Under Siege"	November 18, 2012
A violent shooting spree plaguing Arizona. Dale Hausner and Samuel Dieteman
48	11	"Killings in Kentucky"	November 25, 2012
On a winter morning, a beloved veterinarian and his wife and son are viciously gunned down in their Columbia, Kentucky, home.
49	12	"No Mercy"	December 2, 2012
In 2001, a mother of triplets is found strangled in her Puyallup, Washington, home. Was she the victim of dangerous obsession, or a classic love triangle?
50	13	"Maritime Murder"	December 9, 2012
In 1982, a Naval Officer dies from a mysterious illness. When toxicology reports reveal he was poisoned, Naval Investigators sift through a ship of countless theories.

=== Season 5 (2013) ===
No. overall	No. in season	Title	Original release date
51	1	"Deadly Forest"	March 31, 2013
In 1985, popular high school girl Michele Avila is murdered in the Angeles National Forest. Investigators run through a network of classmates, rivals and troublemakers to find the killer. Years later, a break in the cases exposes the shocking truth and unearths a devastating betrayal.
52	2	"Christmas Mourning"	April 7, 2013
Murder of Beverly Eller in Griffin, Georgia
53	3	"Burning Fury"	April 14, 2013
In 1988, a 29-year-old man is found tortured and murdered in his burnt apartment in Sunset Beach, California. As two decades pass, investigators close in on a surprising and sadistic killer.
54	4	"Driven to Murder"	April 21, 2013
Murder of Jay Schuyler Alland in Laurel, Maryland
55	5	"Phantom Predator"	April 28, 2013
A serial predator targets St. Louis in the 1990's.
56	6	"Deathbed"	May 12, 2013
Murder of Gerald Jackson in San Diego
57	7	"The Deacon's Undoing"	May 19, 2013
Murder of Phillip Perry in Upland, California
58	8	"Sin City Slaying"	May 26, 2013
Murder of Martha Doney
59	9	"Manufacturing Murder"	June 2, 2013
Nelson Serrano
60	10	"Little Boy Lost"	June 9, 2013
Murder of Shawn Moore in Flint, Michigan
61	11	"When Evil Strikes"	June 16, 2013
Murder of Jonathan Blackwell in Reidsville, North Carolina
62	12	"The Last Resort"	June 23, 2013
Lauderdale-by-the-Sea, Florida resort manager Rudi Houda is walking through a grocery store parking lot to his car, when out of nowhere, a mysterious pickup pulls up alongside Houda and someone inside douses him with a cooler full of deadly acid. Despite prompt help from bystanders, paramedics, and doctors, Houda later dies of his injuries. Further investigation reveals that Houda was involved in a contentious oceanfront property war with a neighboring condominium owner who made it no secret that he wished Houda harm.
63	13	"Dangerous Fortune"	June 30, 2013
A Vietnamese fortune teller and her daughter are discovered stabbed to death in Westminster, California and covered in white paint in what seems to a ritualistic double homicide. Thorough investigation and forensics ultimately identify a suspect who harbored unrealistic romantic goals and bore a grudge against one of the victims for not making them come true.

=== Season 6 (2014) ===
No. overall	No. in season	Title	Original release date
64	1	"Vanished in Reno"	January 12, 2014
Murder of Brianna Denison
65	2	"High School Homicide"	January 19, 2014
Murder of Amy Weidner in Indianapolis
66	3	"Brute Force"	January 26, 2014
Murder of Corinna Mullen in Central City, Kentucky
67	4	"Murder in Room 348"	February 9, 2014
Murder of Greg Fleniken in Beaumont, Texas
68	5	"Wicked Impulse"	February 16, 2014
Murder of Jean Schwartz in Topanga, California
69	6	"Death of Innocence"	February 23, 2014
Murder of Kenny Conrick in Gary, Indiana
70	7	"Hometown Homicide"	March 2, 2014
Murder of Elizabeth Crossman in Hemet, California
71	8	"Stone Cold Killer"	March 9, 2014
Murder of Genevieve Tetpon in Anchorage, Alaska
72	9	"Blood in the Water"	March 16, 2014
In 1980, teenager Nanine Grimes is brutally murdered in Thornton, Colorado. The killer stabbed her more than 80 times. However the killer's blood is also found at the crime scene. Twenty five years later, investigators finally figure out the killer's identity.
73	10	"Sinister Secret"	March 23, 2014
In 1985, 13-year-old Teri Jo Bradish vanishes from a group home for wayward youth and is found raped and strangled the following morning. Over two decades later, advances in DNA forensics and a workaholic lab technician identify the killer as one of the last people in Bradish's life who would have been suspected of this heinous crime.
74	11	"Dead End Trail"	March 30, 2014
When college student and radio communications student Susan Schumake is found murdered in a heavily wooded area of her SIU campus in 1981, detectives question whether the crime is related to several previous slayings of young women in the area.
75	12	"Nightclub Nightmare"	April 20, 2014
Murder of Jennifer Burns in Arlington, Texas
76	13	"Death Comes Calling"	April 27, 2014
Murder of Ottilia and Casper Volk in Lake Oswego, Oregon

=== Season 7 (2015) ===
No. overall	No. in season	Title	Original release date
77	1	"Deadly Desire"	January 4, 2015
67-year-old Alice Hufnagle is found raped and strangled to death in her home days before Thanksgiving 2002. After casting a net that includes suitors, neighbors, and co-workers, investigators close in on a suspect who harbored an unrequited infatuation with the East Norriton pharmacist.
78	2	"Last Dance"	January 11, 2015
A Naval officer returns home to find his talented and popular 16-year-old stepdaughter, Meghan Landowski, brutally murdered. Suspects include every male in her high school social circle and a family friend who may have been getting too close to her.
79	3	"No Good Deed"	January 18, 2015
In 2005, a 28-year-old photographer and college student Samuel Lea is found murdered in his apartment. Investigators suspect that the victim's generosity and willingness to help those in need may have led a killer to his door.
80	4	"Deadly Accusation"	January 25, 2015
81	5	"Death And Taxes"	February 8, 2015
When a successful tax attorney is found strangled to death on his Fort Pierce, Florida, property, detectives scrutinize jealous boyfriends, deadbeat tenants, and delinquent clients on their way to finding their killer.
82	6	"Murder In The Mirror"	February 15, 2015
When a beloved matriarch is found murdered in her Hubbardston, Michigan, home, investigators cast a suspicious eye on friends and neighbors, determined to solve the small town's first homicide.
83	7	"An Eye For Murder"	February 22, 2015
The close-knit community of Navy town Mayport, Florida, is rocked by the brutal rape and murder of 21-year-old Dina Kichler on December 1, 1990. She was happily chatting with her mother, who lived in Alabama, on the phone when someone knocked on the front door. Although advised by her mom to not answer the front door, Kichler said it was okay because she knew the man at the door. Her mom never heard any of what happened and just assumed her daughter would call back later. But on the following Monday everyone – from family members to coworkers – worry about Kichler's absence and that leads to the police finding her body back at her home. An arrest did take place but the alleged killer walked free on December 22 of the same year. But in 1997, detectives from New Hampshire state attending a national law enforcement conference were presented with Kichler's case, and noticed remarkable similarities between her murder and a cold case they had in 1987 – the murder of Michele LaFond. With the advances of DNA technology and some other evidences the cold blooded killer, who always acted motivated by uncontrollable lust and rage, was finally arrested in 1998.
84	8	"Absent Teacher"	March 1, 2015
In Westmont, Illinois 29-year-old school teacher Rachel Rachlin had her friends and family in a panic. She had been missing for days along all her furniture and possessions. Two weeks after her disappearance, her car was found in a remote long term parking lot at Chicago O'Hare Airport. Records showed it had been there since August 20, 1993, the day after Rachel was last seen. Police noticed a liquid dripping from the bottom of the trunk. When they opened it, inside they found Rachel's body completely covered with about a quarter ton of dirt. Finding her killer leads to discovering the evil and mundane reasons for her murder.
85	9	"Left Alone"	March 8, 2015
In 1986, 13-year-old Mollie Pittman is attacked and murdered in Orlando, Florida. With no sign of a break-in, investigators wonder, did Mollie know her killer?
86	10	"Flames In Paradise"	March 15, 2015
David Stevens, a supervisor for a popular dating service, is found murdered inside his torched car on a lonely La Jolla street and detectives investigating the case discover a startling connection between David's killer and an employee of David's with whom he was secretly having an affair.
87	11	"Nightmare Field"	March 22, 2015
On August 7, 2011, 23-year-old Dalene Carlson goes out for a night of fun at the local bar and never returns. Her corpse is discovered in a corn field months later, with several spent bullets among her remains. After clearing her volatile ex-boyfriend and others of any involvement, investigators rely on witness accounts, ballistics, and the bar's surveillance system to ultimately identify who was responsible for her disappearance and murder.
88	12	"Little Girl Gone"	March 29, 2015
Murder of Dolana Clark in Great Falls, Montana
89	13	"Barefoot Homicide"	April 5, 2015
On November 30, 1984, at Drexel University, 20-year-old math major Deborah Wilson was viciously strangled to death. When her body was discovered the following morning, she was missing her shoes and socks. Some of her classmates and individuals trusted to protect her were suspects. Even though there was no evidence of sexual assault, it's later revealed that this was a crime of sexual nature, committed by someone who should have been keeping her safe instead.

=== Season 8 (2016) ===
No. overall	No. in season	Title	Original release date
90	1	"New Years Evil"	January 10, 2016
After 23-year-old Ashley Kline is found murdered in a Pennsylvania wildlife preserve, investigators must piece together the last few moments of her life to determine who killed her.
91	2	"Silent Night"	January 17, 2016
On Christmas evening, 33-year-old Jaime Larson is mercilessly murdered. Her boyfriend, who found her body in the bathtub, and some of her neighborhood friends are all suspects. But the killer turns out to be a much creepier person than any of the investigators could ever anticipate.
92	3	"Ashes to Ashes"	January 24, 2016
Two weeks after the eruption of Mount St. Helens, 8-year-old Kristine Zimmerman was found fatally strangled in an isolated forest outside Ocean Shores, Washington. Several people come forward and help police put together a timeline of Kristine's disappearance. But a few wrong testimonies almost let the murderer get away with his crime.
93	4	"Vicious Voyeur"	January 31, 2016
On May 21, 2002, in Raleigh, North Carolina, 23-year-old Stephanie Bennett was found naked, bound, gagged and murdered. No one of her roommates or neighbors could really help the Police with concrete information. But what no one would expect was that the killer – who was arrested three years later – was someone who lived among them.
94	5	"Drive With Danger"	February 13, 2016
Janean Brown spent her last night on Earth at the Copper Lantern in Whitehouse, Ohio – a friendly neighborhood bar. Two days later, on November 19, 1983, her nearly decapitated naked body was found buried under a pile of dirt. Twenty-eight years slipped by with no leads until the DNA lab reported on a piece of investigation that would lead to the trial of the rapist murderer 3 years later.
95	6	"Knives And Lies"	February 21, 2016
On December 30, 1993, in an apart complex in Salt Lake City, fourteen-year-old Christopher Mosier was at home babysitting a neighbor's eleven-month-old son. An hour later, the woman in the unit below was jolted awake by noise. 45 minutes after that, at 9:00 pm, Christopher's mother – Silvia – came home after working the dinner shift at a nearby restaurant. She then found her son brutally stabbed and no sign of the baby anywhere. Eight years later, the investigation focused on a suspect that had skipped town not so long after the murder. The information acquired during this last interrogation in addition to state of the art DNA analysis helped police to finally solve the case.
96	7	"Last Curtain Call"	February 28, 2016
In the hot desert town of Yuma, Arizona, Hollywood actor turned businessman Jimmy Ferrara was shot dead in his home on September 29, 1985. He was last seen driving near his house with a blond stranger at 7:45 pm – 30 minutes before police believed he was gunned down. The hunt for the killer led to surprising suspects but still the case went cold for lacking evidence. Nearly 20 years later, there was a new twist no one saw coming.
97	8	"Murder Down Memory Lane"	March 6, 2016
On September 18, 2008, in Santa Ana, California, Darlene Saddler is found dead, lying on the floor in a pool of blood, with a large kitchen knife sticking right out of the base of her neck. It is soon discovered that her little daughter was in the house while everything happened. A five-year-old now holds the key to her own mother's murder.
98	9	"Housebound Homicide"	March 13, 2016
Housebound in her Denver apartment, 36-year-old Renee Ealy relied on support visits from family, friends and neighbors. On the night of June 22, 2000, one of those trusted visitors stabbed her to death 21 times.
99	10	"Kill Now, Pay Later"	March 20, 2016
On March 21, 1980, in Santa Clara, California, 32-year-old businessman Howard Witkin was shot and killed in his own home in what seemed a carefully planned ambush. Investigation quickly revealed the motive wasn't love or hate but one just as timeless: money. Arrests took place and the case was closed just two years after the event. But ten years after the killing, a revelation comes to light and the person who had been sentenced to life in prison for Witkin's death, manages to get the judge to dismiss the original conviction for a lighter sentence in return for exposing the real mastermind behind this murder.
100	11	"End of the Line"	March 27, 2016
Just after 2:30 A.M. on March 5, 1994, 18-year-old college freshman Stephanie Hummer was headed to a party near the Ohio State University campus. She never made it. Instead, she was found naked and bludgeoned to death four miles away in a desolate field. A change in the law is what will help police to arrest the killer 12 years later.
101	12	"Final Lesson"	April 3, 2016
The killer of a Santa Monica, California, art teacher remains at large for years as police use every trick in their arsenal to finally hunt him down.
102	13	"Stone Cold Fusion"	April 10, 2016
The leading advocate for the controversial science of cold fusion is beaten to death and investigators run the full gamut of suspects, from corporate executives to drug-crazed burglars, to find his killer.
