= Claire St. Amant =

American journalist

- Born: Katy, Texas, U.S.
- Education: Baylor University (BA)
- Occupations: Investigative journalist, podcast host, author, producer, executive producer
- Years active: 2008–present
- Website: clairestamant.com

Claire St. Amant is an American investigative journalist, television producer, author, and true crime podcast host. She is known for her work as a producer on CBS News' 48 Hours and 60 Minutes, and as the host, writer, and producer of the podcast Final Days on Earth. An Emmy-nominated producer, her memoir, Killer Story: The Truth Behind True Crime Television, details her experiences in the true crime industry.

== Early life and education ==
St. Amant was born and raised in Katy, Texas. She attended Baylor University, where she graduated summa cum laude in 2008 with a Bachelor of Arts in Professional Writing and a minor in Journalism. She was inducted into Phi Beta Kappa.

After graduation, St. Amant served as a volunteer in the Peace Corps in Ukraine.

== Career ==
=== Early career ===
St. Amant began her journalism career at People Newspapers in Dallas, where she won two Philbin Awards for excellence in legal reporting. At age 24, she conducted an investigative series on a faked home invasion, which led to her recruitment by CBS News. She served as a founding editor of CultureMap Dallas before joining CBS News in 2014.

=== CBS News ===
At CBS, she developed and produced crime stories, contributing to over 20 episodes of 48 Hours. Her work included coverage of an assassination attempt on a judge in Austin, Texas, a serial killer in South Carolina, and a murder-for-hire plot involving two doctors in Houston.

In 2016, she was part of the breaking news team for the special report “Bringing a Nation Together” on the 2016 Dallas police shooting. The report won a New York Press Club award and earned the team an Emmy nomination for Outstanding Coverage of a Breaking News Story in a News Magazine.

In 2019, she contributed to a 60 Minutes segment titled “The Ranger and The Serial Killer.”

=== Podcasting ===
St. Amant is the writer, producer, and host of the true crime podcast Final Days on Earth, which investigates mysterious deaths and cold cases through multi-episode series, including cases such as the 2014 death of Dammion Heard (Season 1), the 2002 disappearance and death of Jennifer Harris (Season 2), and the 2011 murder of Greg Williams (Season 3).

=== Teaching ===
In 2024, she was named the Radford Visiting Professor in the Department of Journalism, Public Relations & New Media at Baylor University, where she teaches a class on podcasting.

=== Writing ===
Her memoir, Killer Story, was published in 2025 by BenBella Books and distributed by Simon & Schuster. The book explores the behind-the-scenes world of true crime television production.

=== Executive producing ===
In 2026, St. Amant served as an executive producer on the true crime docuseries Killer Confessions: Case Files of a Texas Ranger, which premiered on Investigation Discovery on January 13, 2026, and became available for streaming on HBO Max the following day. The series focuses on retired Texas Ranger James Holland and his interrogations of serial killers and other suspects, building on a segment St. Amant produced for 60 Minutes in 2019.
