= Final Days On Earth =

American true crime podcast

Final Days on Earth
- Genre: True crime
- Format: Audio podcast
- Language: English

Cast and voices
- Hosted by: Claire St. Amant

Production
- Length: 20–60 minutes

Publication
- No. of seasons: 4
- No. of episodes: 107
- Original release: April 20, 2021
- Provider: Rogue Media Network
- Updates: Weekly

Related
- Website: finaldaysonearth.com

Final Days on Earth is an American true crime podcast hosted by investigative journalist Claire St. Amant. The podcast premiered on April 20, 2021, and focuses on re-examining mysterious deaths and cold cases, often involving elements of accident, suicide, or murder. Each of the first three seasons is dedicated to a single case, while later episodes under "Justice Pending" cover ongoing and unsolved crimes.

== Format ==
The podcast reconstructs the final days of victims' lives and scrutinizes the ensuing investigations. Early seasons feature serialized storytelling on one case per season, with episodes including interviews, evidence analysis, and updates. Starting with Season 4, titled "Justice Pending," the format shifts to bi-weekly discussions of various unsolved or ongoing cases.

== Seasons ==
=== Season 1: The Life and Death of Dammion Heard (2021) ===
The inaugural season consists of 12 episodes and investigates the 2014 disappearance and death of college wrestler Dammion Heard in Gunnison, Colorado. Heard went missing after a party, and his death was ruled a suicide, though the podcast questions this conclusion based on inconsistencies like missing personal items.

=== Season 2: The Life and Death of Jennifer Harris (2022) ===
This 12-episode season covers the 2002 disappearance of Jennifer Harris in Bonham, Texas, on Mother's Day. Her body was found a week later in the Red River. The podcast explores the investigation and hidden secrets in the case.

=== Season 3: The Life and Death of Greg Williams (2023) ===
An 8-episode season examining the 2011 shooting death of tech entrepreneur Greg Williams in Keller, Texas. His wife reported an intruder, but the podcast re-evaluates the murder investigation.

=== Season 4: Justice Pending (2024–present) ===
This ongoing season features shorter episodes discussing recent and unsolved cases, such as the assassination of UnitedHealthcare CEO Brian Thompson and other high-profile crimes.

== Production ==
The podcast is produced by Rogue Media Network and hosted by Claire St. Amant, a former producer for CBS News programs like 48 Hours and 60 Minutes. St. Amant serves as writer, producer, and host.

== Reception ==
Final Days on Earth has received generally positive reviews for its investigative depth and St. Amant's passionate delivery. On Apple Podcasts, it holds a 4.5 out of 5 rating based on over 760 reviews, with listeners praising its conversational yet professional tone. Some critics have noted it as "tedious and one-sided" in certain episodes.
