= List of Lockup episodes =

The following is the list of episodes of the MSNBC documentary TV series, Lockup.

== Series overview ==
Season	Episodes	Originally released	
Season	Episodes	First released	Last released
1	18	June 4, 2005	February 4, 2006
2	6	July 24, 2006	December 18, 2006
3	12	September 7, 2007	December 28, 2007
4	28	January 2, 2008	May 23, 2009
5	14	May 25, 2009	December 26, 2009
6	3	January 1, 2010	January 23, 2010
7	8	March 6, 2010	April 24, 2010
8	14	July 3, 2010	December 25, 2010
9	7	December 25, 2010	April 9, 2011
10	12	July 2, 2011	October 15, 2011
11	6	November 26, 2011	December 31, 2011
12	6	January 7, 2012	February 18, 2012
13	8	April 7, 2012	May 26, 2012
14	12	October 13, 2012	December 29, 2012
15	12	April 13, 2013	August 17, 2013
16	12	October 5, 2013	December 21, 2013
17	6	March 1, 2014	April 5, 2014
18	7	May 31, 2014	July 12, 2014
19	5	September 6, 2014	October 4, 2014
20	6	November 22, 2014	December 27, 2014
21	6	February 28, 2015	April 4, 2015
22	6	May 30, 2015	July 4, 2015
23	6	August 1, 2015	September 5, 2015
24	12	October 10, 2015	December 26, 2015
25	5	January 14, 2017	February 11, 2017

== Episodes ==
=== Season 1 (2005–06) ===
No. in series	Title	Original air date
1	"Inside Riverbend"	June 4, 2005
2	"Return to Valley State"	June 11, 2005
3	"Return to Rikers Island"	June 18, 2005
4	"Inside Utah State Prison"	June 25, 2005
5	"Inside North Carolina Women's Prison"	July 2, 2005
6	"Inside Kentucky State Penetentiary"	July 9, 2005
7	"Inside Anamosa"	July 16, 2005
8	"Return to Pelican Bay"	July 23, 2005
9	"Return to Corcoran"	November 26, 2005
10	"Inside Wabash"	December 3, 2005
11	"Inside Miami-Dade Corrections"	December 10, 2005
12	"Inside the Penitentiary of New Mexico"	December 17, 2005
13	"Inside Elayn Hunt Prison"	December 31, 2005
14	"The Inmate Diaries"	January 7, 2006
15	"Inside Stateville"	January 14, 2006
16	"Inside L.A. County Jail"	January 21, 2006
17	"Inside Folsom Prison"	January 28, 2006
18	"Inside San Quentin"	February 4, 2006

=== Season 2 (2006) ===
No. in series	Title	Original air date
19	"Inside Kern Valley"	July 24, 2006
20	"Inside Iowa State Penetentiary"	August 28, 2006
21	"Inside Brushy Mounutain"	November 27, 2006
22	"Inside Holman Correctional Facility"	December 4, 2006
23	"Inside Indiana State Prison"	December 11, 2006
24	"Inside Spring Creek, Alaska"	December 18, 2006

=== Season 3 (2007) ===
No. in series	Title	Original air date
25	"San Quentin Extended Stay: The Gang's All Here"	September 7, 2007
26	"San Quentin Extended Stay: Killing Time"	September 14, 2007
27	"San Quentin Extended Stay: The Conjugal Visit"	September 21, 2007
28	"San Quentin Extended Stay: Bad Boys, Bad Boys"	September 28, 2007
29	"San Quentin Extended Stay: Weapons"	October 5, 2007
30	"San Quentin Extended Stay: Slammin' in the Slammer"	October 12, 2007
31	"Holman Extended Stay: He Takes No Prisoners"	December 10, 2007
32	"Holman Extended Stay: Locked Up Love"	December 11, 2007
33	"Holman Extended Stay: Snake and Fluffy"	December 12, 2007
34	"Holman Extended Stay: The Shakedown"	December 13, 2007
35	"Holman Extended Stay: 'Till Death Do Us Part"	December 14, 2007
36	"Holman Extended Stay: You Wanna Work Where?"	December 28, 2007

=== Season 4 (2008–09) ===
No. in series	Title	Original air date
37	"Raw: Criminal Minds"	January 2, 2008
38	"Raw: Hell in a Cell"	February 11, 2008
39	"Raw: Violence Behind Bars"	February 18, 2008
40	"Raw: The Convict Code"	February 25, 2008
41	"Raw: Ever Present Danger"	July 5, 2008
42	"Raw: Prison Love"	July 12, 2008
43	"Raw: The Daily Grind"	July 19, 2008
44	"Raw: The Devil's Workshop"	July 26, 2008
45	"Corcoran Extended Stay: Love and Hate"	August 2, 2008
46	"Corcoran Extended Stay: Everyone Gets Got"	August 9, 2008
47	"Corcoran Extended Stay: Prison Politics"	August 16, 2008
48	"Corcoran Extended Stay: Hugs, Not Drugs"	August 30, 2008
49	"Corcoran Extended Stay: Lockdown"	September 6, 2008
50	"Corcoran Extended Stay: Road to Redemption"	September 20, 2008
51	"Raw: Inmates Gone Wild	October 18, 2008
52	"Raw: America's Toughest Jails"	October 25, 2008
53	"Raw: Hard Time"	November 8, 2008
54	"Raw: Friend or Foe"	November 22, 2008
55	"New Mexico Extended Stay: Taking a Hostage"	November 29, 2008
56	"New Mexico Extended Stay: Pros and Cons"	December 6, 2008
57	"New Mexico Extended Stay: Fight or Flight"	December 13, 2008
58	"New Mexico Extended Stay: Institutionalized"	December 20, 2008
59	"New Mexico Extended Stay: War"	December 27, 2008
60	"New Mexico Extended Stay: Get Out and Stay Out"	December 27, 2008
61	"Raw: Killers Among Us"	January 1, 2009
62	"Raw: Survival 101"	January 1, 2009
63	"Raw: Ganging Up"	May 16, 2009
64	"Raw: Time to Kill"	May 23, 2009

=== Season 5 (2009) ===
No. in series	Title	Original air date
65	"Indiana State Prison Extended Stay: Old-School Convicts"	May 25, 2009
66	"Indiana State Prison Extended Stay: Tipped Off"	May 30, 2009
67	"Indiana State Prison Extended Stay: Cutting"	June 6, 2009
68	"Indiana State Prison Extended Stay: For Better or For Worse"	June 13, 2009
69	"Indiana State Prison Extended Stay: Brotherhood"	June 20, 2009
70	"Indiana State Prison Extended Stay: Predator & Prey"	July 4, 2009
71	"Limon, Colorado Extended Stay: There Goes the Neighborhood"	November 21, 2009
72	"World Tour: Eastern Europe"	November 26, 2009
73	"World Tour: Western Europe"	November 26, 2009
74	"Limon, Colorado Extended Stay: Crackdown"	November 28, 2009
75	"Limon, Colorado Extended Stay: The Hustle"	December 5, 2009
76	"Limon, Colorado Extended Stay: Homecoming"	December 22, 2009
77	"Limon, Colorado Extended Stay: Pain"	December 19, 2009
78	"Limon, Colorado Extended Stay: Love Hurts"	December 26, 2009

=== Season 6 (2010) ===
No. in series	Title	Original air date
79	"Tennessee Women's Prison"	January 1, 2010
80	"Zero to Sixty"	January 1, 2010
81	"North Carolina's Women"	January 23, 2010

=== Season 7 (2010) ===
No. in series	Title	Original air date
82	"Raw: Predatory Behavior"	March 6, 2010
83	"Raw: Never a Dull Moment"	March 13, 2010
84	"Living the Life"	March 20, 2010
85	"Raw: Pushing the Limits"	March 27, 2010
86	"Raw: The Killer Next Door"	April 3, 2010
87	"Raw: The Revolving Door"	April 10, 2010
88	"Raw: Hardcore"	April 17, 2010
89	"Raw: Dues and Don't"	April 24, 2010

=== Season 8 (2010) ===
No. in series	Title	Original air date
90	"Maricopa County Extended Stay: Daddy's Girl"	July 3, 2010
91	"Maricopa County Extended Stay: Chain Reaction"	July 10, 2010
92	"Maricopa County Extended Stay: Heat Wave"	July 17, 2010
93	"Maricopa County Extended Stay: High Stakes"	July 24, 2010
94	"Maricopa County Extended Stay: Identity Crisis"	July 31, 2010
95	"Maricopa County Extended Stay: Trials and Tribulations"	August 7, 2010
96	"Raw: Doomed Decisions"	November 6, 2010
97	"Raw: Harsh Reality"	November 13, 2010
98	"Raw: Consequences"	November 20, 2010
99	"Raw: The Three "R's"	November 27, 2010
100	"Raw: It's Complicated"	December 4, 2010
101	"Raw: Nothing but Time"	December 11, 2010
102	"Raw: Ain't No Hotel"	December 18, 2010
103	"Raw: A Private Hell"	December 25, 2010

=== Season 9 (2010–11) ===
No. in series	Title	Original air date
104	"Orange County Jail Extended Stay: The Confession"	December 25, 2010
105	"Orange County Jail Extended Stay: Wake Up Call"	December 25, 2010
106	"Life After Lockup: Komyatti, Slagle, and Tye"	February 26, 2011
107	"Orange County Jail Extended Stay: Murder and Miracles"	March 19, 2011
108	"Orange County Jail Extended Stay: Unholy Trinity"	March 26, 2011
109	"Orange County Jail Extended Stay: Highs and Lows"	April 2, 2011
110	"Orange County Jail Extended Stay: Cabin Fever"	April 9, 2011

=== Season 10 (2011) ===
No. in series	Title	Original air date
111	"Boston Extended Stay: Blood Brothers"	July 2, 2011
112	"Boston Extended Stay: The Box Life"	July 9, 2011
113	"Boston Extended Stay: Feel, Deal, Heel"	July 16, 2011
114	"Boston Extended Stay: Family Jewels"	July 23, 2011
115	"Boston Extended Stay: Baptism by Fire"	August 6, 2011
116	"Boston Extended Stay: Bad Rep"	August 13, 2011
117	"Tampa Extended Stay: High Profile"	September 3, 2011
118	"Tampa Extended Stay: Supply and Demand"	September 17, 2011
119	"Tampa Extended Stay: Mother Knows Best?"	September 24, 2011
120	"Tampa Extended Stay: The Company You Keep"	October 1, 2011
121	"Tampa Extended Stay: Bitter Pills"	October 8, 2011
122	"Tampa Extended Stay: You Feel Me?"	October 15, 2011

=== Season 11 (2011) ===
No. in series	Title	Original air date
123	"Wabash Valley Extended Stay: Sticks and Stones"	November 26, 2011
124	"Wabash Valley Extended Stay: Skitz"	December 3, 2011
125	"Wabash Valley Extended Stay: We Fight"	December 10, 2011
126	"Wabash Valley Extended Stay: Close Quarters"	December 17, 2011
127	"Wabash Valley Extended Stay: Da Future"	December 24, 2011
128	"Wabash Valley Extended Stay: Father Figure"	December 31, 2011

=== Season 12 (2012) ===
No. in series	Title	Original air date
129	"Raw: Lasting Impressions"	January 7, 2012
130	"Raw: LOL...JK"	January 14, 2012
131	"Raw: The Flip Side"	January 28, 2012
132	"Raw: The Thin Line"	February 4, 2012
133	"Raw: Word to the Wise"	February 11, 2012
134	"Raw: Jailhouse Blues"	February 18, 2012

=== Season 13 (2012) ===
No. in series	Title	Original air date
135	"Santa Rosa Extended Stay: Blood Lines"	April 7, 2012
136	"Santa Rosa Extended Stay: The Wrong Fight"	April 15, 2012
137	"Santa Rosa Extended Stay: Troubled Waters"	April 22, 2012
138	"Santa Rosa Extended Stay: Warriors"	May 5, 2012
139	"Santa Rosa Extended Stay: You Reap What You Sow"	May 5, 2012
140	"Santa Rosa Extended Stay: The Damage is Done"	May 12, 2012
141	"World Tour: Israel"	May 19, 2012
142	"Life After Lockup: Boltjes, Wrinkles, Gill, and Gilbert"	May 26, 2012

=== Season 14 (2012) ===
No. in series	Title	Original air date
143	"Louisville Extended Stay: Lightning Voltz"	October 13, 2012
144	"Louisville Extended Stay: Horribility"	October 20, 2012
145	"Louisville Extended Stay: Enough is Enough"	October 27, 2012
146	"Louisville Extended Stay: Bam, Bam"	November 10, 2012
147	"Louisville Extended Stay: Miss Fortune"	November 10, 2012
148	"Louisville Extended Stay: Next of Kin"	November 17, 2012
149	"San Antonio Extended Stay: X'd Out"	November 17, 2012
150	"San Antonio Extended Stay: Defiance"	December 1, 2012
151	"San Antonio Extended Stay: Words of a Warrior"	December 8, 2012
152	"San Antonio Extended Stay: Carry That Weight"	December 15, 2012
153	"San Antonio Extended Stay: A House Divided"	December 22, 2012
154	"San Antonio Extended Stay: Love Sick"	December 29, 2012

=== Season 15 (2013) ===
No. in series	Title	Original air date
155	"Cleveland Extended Stay: It Burns"	April 13, 2013
156	"Cleveland Extended Stay: Wombmates"	April 20, 2013
157	"Cleveland Extended Stay: Rush"	April 27, 2013
158	"Cleveland Extended Stay: Bullschmidt"	May 4, 2013
159	"Cleveland Extended Stay: Checkmate"	May 11, 2013
160	"Oakland Extended Stay: To PC or Not to PC"	July 6, 2013
161	"Oakland Extended Stay: Wait of the World"	July 13, 2013
162	"Oakland Extended Stay: Permanent Scars"	July 20, 2013
163	"Oakland Extended Stay: Getting Schooled"	July 27, 2013
164	"Oakland Extended Stay: The New Girl"	August 3, 2013
165	"Oakland Extended Stay: Church of Enemies"	August 10, 2013
166	"Tangled Web"	August 17, 2013

=== Season 16 (2013) ===
No. in series	Title	Original air date
167	"Tulsa Extended Stay: Beat Down"	October 5, 2013
168	"Tulsa Extended Stay: No Escape"	October 12, 2013
169	"Tulsa Extended Stay: Shackled Love"	October 19, 2013
170	"Tulsa Extended Stay: Two Degrees of Murder"	October 26, 2013
171	"Tulsa Extended Stay: The Bad Good Friday"	November 2, 2013
172	"Tulsa Extended Stay: Brother Against Brother"	November 9, 2013
173	"Grand Rapids Extended Stay: Piece of Cake"	November 16, 2013
174	"Grand Rapids Extended Stay: Outcast"	November 23, 2013
175	"Grand Rapids Extended Stay: Jailing"	November 30, 2013
176	"Grand Rapids Extended Stay: And Baby Makes Three?"	December 7, 2013
177	"Grand Rapids Extended Stay: The Gamble"	December 14, 2013
178	"Grand Rapids Extended Stay: The Hamptons"	December 21, 2013

=== Season 17 (2014) ===
No. in series	Title	Original air date
179	"Hackensack Extended Stay: Thicker Than a Bowl of Oatmeal"	March 1, 2014
180	"Hackensack Extended Stay: No Remorse"	March 8, 2014
181	"Hackensack Extended Stay: Smoking Gun"	March 15, 2014
182	"Hackensack Extended Stay: Going Postal"	March 22, 2014
183	"Hackensack Extended Stay: Mama's Boy Drug"	March 29, 2014
184	"Hackensack Extended Stay: God is Not Here"	April 5, 2014

=== Season 18 (2014) ===
No. in series	Title	Original air date
185	"Raw: The Gang Investigators"	May 31, 2014
186	"Raw: A Brotherhood of Gangs"	June 7, 2014
187	"Raw: No Boys Allowed"	June 14, 2014
188	"Raw: Severed Ties"	June 21, 2014
189	"Raw: Trouble in Tulsa"	June 28, 2014
190	"Raw: Views from the Crew"	July 5, 2014
191	"Fairfax County Jail Extended Stay"	July 12, 2014

=== Season 19 (2014) ===
No. in series	Title	Original air date
192	"Fairfax Extended Stay: Solitary"	September 6, 2014
193	"Fairfax Extended Stay: Time Never Waits"	September 13, 2014
194	"Fairfax Extended Stay: The Crip and the Cougar"	September 20, 2014
195	"Fairfax Extended Stay: Do Not Pass "Go""	September 27, 2014
196	"Fairfax Extended Stay: Counterfeit Lives"	October 4, 2014

=== Season 20 (2014) ===
No. in series	Title	Original air date
197	"Charleston Extended Stay: Fallen Leaf"	November 22, 2014
198	"Charleston Extended Stay: Dirt Roads and Trouble"	November 29, 2014
199	"Charleston Extended Stay: Tempt Not a Desperate Man"	December 6, 2014
200	"Charleston Extended Stay: Suicide Watch"	December 13, 2014
201	"Charleston Extended Stay: Fatality"	December 20, 2014
202	"Charleston Extended Stay: Mail, Nails, and Jail"	December 27, 2014

=== Season 21 (2015) ===
No. in series	Title	Original air date
203	"Cincinnati Extended Stay: Snitch-innati"	February 28, 2015
204	"Cincinnati Extended Stay: Sucker Punch"	March 7, 2015
205	"Cincinnati Extended Stay: Message in a Bottle"	March 14, 2015
206	"Cincinnati Extended Stay: Killing Clouds"	March 21, 2015
207	"Cincinnati Extended Stay: Homeless in Jail"	March 28, 2015
208	"Cincinnati Extended Stay: Dead Run"	April 4, 2015

=== Season 22 (2015) ===
No. in series	Title	Original air date
209	"Long Island Extended Stay: Sufferin' County"	May 30, 2015
210	"Long Island Extended Stay: Jail-born"	June 6, 2015
211	"Long Island Extended Stay: No More Franks and Beans"	June 13, 2015
212	"Long Island Extended Stay: Old School, New School"	June 20, 2015
213	"Long Island Extended Stay: Red and Whites"	June 27, 2015
214	"Long Island Extended Stay: Blue Balloons"	July 4, 2015

=== Season 23 (2015) ===
No. in series	Title	Original air date
215	"Savannah Extended Stay: Outlaws and In-Laws"	August 1, 2015
216	"Savannah Extended Stay: Wis-dumb"	August 8, 2015
217	"Savannah Extended Stay: Hard on the Yard"	August 15, 2015
218	"Savannah Extended Stay: Notorious"	August 22, 2015
219	"Savannah Extended Stay: Back in Orange"	August 29, 2015
220	"Savannah Extended Stay: Blood Lines"	September 5, 2015

=== Season 24 (2015) ===
No. in series	Title	Original air date
221	"Raw: A Young Person's Guide to Jail"	October 10, 2015
222	"Raw: Unravelling the Truth"	October 17, 2015
223	"Raw: Rock Bottom"	October 24, 2015
224	"Raw: The Ties That Bind"	October 31, 2015
225	"Raw: The Little Things"	November 7, 2015
226	"Raw: SEG"	November 14, 2015
227	"Sacramento Extended Stay: Purple Pain"	November 21, 2015
228	"Sacramento Extended Stay: 352,955 Days to Life"	November 28, 2015
229	"Sacramento Extended Stay: Taming Wild"	December 5, 2015
230	"Sacramento Extended Stay: "The Force" LaForce"	December 12, 2015
231	"Sacramento Extended Stay: The Eyes Have It"	December 26, 2015
232	"Sacramento Extended Stay: Starz and Zillas "	December 26, 2015

=== Season 25 (2017) ===
No. in series	Title	Original air date
233	"Wichita Extended Stay: Defending Bacon"	January 14, 2017
234	"Wichita Extended Stay: The Lifestyle"	January 22, 2017
235	"Wichita Extended Stay: On Broadway"	January 28, 2017
236	"Wichita Extended Stay: Citizen's Arrest"	February 4, 2017
237	"Wichita Extended Stay: The Keeper"	February 11, 2017
