= Lockup (TV series) =

American prisons documentary series (2005–2017)

- Genre: Reality, documentary, drama
- Created by: Rasha Drachkovitch
- Developed by: 44 Blue Productions
- Country of origin: United States
- Original language: English
- No. of seasons: 25
- No. of episodes: 237 (list of episodes)

Original release
- Network: MSNBC
- Release: June 4, 2005 – February 11, 2017

Lockup is a prison documentary series, produced by 44 Blue Productions, which airs on MSNBC. Titles within the franchise include Lockup: Raw, Lockup: World Tour, Lockup: Extended Stay, Lockup: Disturbing the Peace, Lockup: Special Investigation, and Life After Lockup.

== Overview ==
The various Lockup series explore jail and prison facilities throughout the United States, profiling inmates, incidents, and prison operations. A typical episode usually follows one or two inmates as they attend disciplinary hearings, receive visits from family, and interact with other inmates. In some episodes, inmates are provided with personal video cameras ("inmate cams") to use in their cells for recording their thoughts.

Titles within the franchise deal in specific areas as follows:

- Extended Stay – Blocks of episodes that each focus on a long-term visit to one prison
- World Tour – Visits to prisons in countries other than the United States
- Special Investigation – Focus on a specific aspect of the prison system, usually the juvenile justice system
- Life After Lockup – Inmates who have been released from prison and are trying to return to society
- Raw – Previously unaired footage from visits to various prisons, interspersed with comments from the production crew

Most episodes end with a 'recap', explaining what happened to a given inmate (or, on occasion, a staff member) months or years after the taping; subsequent episodes will frequently return to a given prison (and/or a given inmate) to revisit them several months later.

The cancellation of Lockup was announced on June 29, 2016, with the twenty-fifth season as the series' last after twelve years.

== See also ==
- Fleece Johnson, a prisoner featured on Lockup in 2010
