= BenBella Books =

Independent publishing house in Texas

- Founded: 2001
- Founder: Glenn Yeffeth
- Headquarters location: Dallas, Texas, U.S.
- Distribution: Simon & Schuster
- Publication types: Books
- Imprints: BenBella, Smart Pop, Matt Holt, BenBella Vegan
- Official website: benbellabooks.com

BenBella Books is an independent publishing house based in Dallas, Texas. BenBella was founded by Glenn Yeffeth in 2001. It specializes in nonfiction books on popular culture, business, health, and nutrition, along with books on science, politics, psychology, and other topics.

BenBella Books has four imprints. The BenBella Books imprint publishes broadly in non-fiction.

The Smart Pop imprint, headed by Robb Pearlman, originally focused on essay anthologies on popular culture but now focuses more broadly on fan-friendly titles.

The BenBella Vegan imprint focuses on plant-based cookbooks and lifestyle titles.

The Matt Holt imprint, launched in 2020, focuses on business, finance, and professional development titles.

== Selected works ==
BenBella published the nutrition book The China Study by T. Colin Campbell in 2005, which has gone on to sell over 3 million copies.

The company published New York Times bestseller Presumed Guilty: Casey Anthony: The Inside Story, written by defense attorney Jose Baez about the Casey Anthony trial, in 2013.

The company published Strange Beautiful Music: A Musical Memoir by guitarist Joe Satriani in May 2014, the Francis J. Greenburger autobiography Risk Game: Self-Portrait of an Entrepreneur in 2016, and in 2018, BenBella announced that it would be publishing Nicole Lapin's third book, Becoming Super Woman.

The company published Murder in the Courthouse, a legal thriller by Nancy Grace, in 2016.

Titles include The Psychology of Harry Potter (2007), Grey's Anatomy 101 (2007), The Science of Dune (2008), and The Science of Michael Crichton (2008).

In 2025, BenBella Books published Killer Story: The Truth Behind True Crime Television by Claire St. Amant.
