= Village of the Damned: Welcome to Dryden =

American TV documentary series (2017)

- Genre: Television documentary
- Country of origin: United States
- Original language: English
- No. of seasons: 1
- No. of episodes: 5

Production
- Executive producers: Stephen Dost; Kevin Fitzpatrick; Greg Spring; Ivy Brown
- Producers: Lorna Thomas; Sara Kozak; Jane Latman
- Running time: 42 minutes
- Production company: Red Marble Media

Original release
- Network: Investigation Discovery
- Release: November 28 – December 27, 2017

Village of the Damned: Welcome to Dryden is a short American television documentary series on Investigation Discovery that debuted on November 28, 2017. The series examines the tragic events that took place in the town of Dryden, New York, between 1989 until 1996.

== Episodes ==
No.	Title	Original release date
1	"The 'Curse' Begins at Christmas"	November 28, 2017
2	"Thirteen Days in Winter"	December 5, 2017
3	"Dryden’s Dark Soul"	December 12, 2017
4	"The Final Fall, Part 1"	December 19, 2017
5	"The Final Fall, Part 2"	December 26, 2017
