= Killer Confessions: Case Files of a Texas Ranger =

American true crime docuseries

- Genre: True crime docuseries
- Presented by: James Holland
- Starring: James Holland
- Country of origin: United States
- Original language: English
- No. of seasons: 1
- No. of episodes: 8

Production
- Executive producers: Bob Friedman; Alexis Robie; Claire St. Amant; Ron Simon; Terry Wrong; Susan Zirinsky
- Running time: 42–44 minutes
- Production companies: Bungalow Media + Entertainment; See It Now Studios

Original release
- Network: Investigation Discovery
- Release: January 13, 2026 – present

Killer Confessions: Case Files of a Texas Ranger is an American true crime docuseries that premiered on Investigation Discovery on January 13, 2026. The series follows retired Texas Ranger James Holland, known for his interrogation techniques, as he elicits confessions in cold cases involving serial killers and unsolved murders. It is produced by Bungalow Media + Entertainment and See It Now Studios. Episodes stream on Max the day after airing.

== Premise ==
The series provides access to interrogation footage, case files, and reflections from James Holland, a retired Texas Ranger nicknamed the "serial killer whisperer" for his ability to obtain confessions in challenging cases. Each episode focuses on specific cold cases, including disappearances and murders, highlighting Holland's psychological interrogation methods.

== Episodes ==
The first season consists of eight episodes, with the premiere being a two-hour special.

- "Pathologically Evil" (January 13, 2026) – Holland investigates cold cases of four missing women linked to William Lewis Reece.
- "Lie, Cheat, Kill" (January 20, 2026)
- "True Crime Lies" (January 27, 2026)
- "A Mother's Manipulation" (February 3, 2026)
- "Obstacles to Justice" (February 10, 2026)
- "A Monsters Game Plan" (February 17, 2026)
- 'The Weakest Link" (March 3, 2026)
- "A Devil Always Lies" (March 10, 2026)

Additional episodes cover cases such as the disappearance of Houston realtor Crystal McDowell and the death of a mother before her wedding.

== Production ==
The series originated from a 2019 60 Minutes segment featuring Holland. It is executive produced by Bob Friedman, Alexis Robie, Claire St. Amant, Ron Simon, Terry Wrong, and Susan Zirinsky.

== Reception ==
On IMDb, the series holds an 8.3/10 rating based on user reviews. On Rotten Tomatoes, it has a critic review noting its compelling confessions but repetitive focus on Holland's personality.
