= Dale Scheanette =

American convicted serial rapist and murderer

Dale Devon Scheanette
- 2000 mugshot of Dale Scheanette
- Born: May 7, 1973; Ouachita Parish, Louisiana, U.S.
- Died: February 10, 2009 (aged 35); Huntsville Unit, Texas, U.S.
- Status: Executed by lethal injection
- Conviction: Capital murder
- Penalty: Death

Details
- Victims: Murdered; Christine Huyen Vu, 25; Wendie Prescott, 22; Survived; 5+ rape victims
- Date: 1996 – 1999
- Country: United States
- Locations: Arlington, Texas; Lancaster, Texas; Grand Prairie, Texas

Dale Devon Scheanette (May 7, 1973 – February 10, 2009), dubbed the Bathtub Killer, was an American serial rapist and murderer involved in two murders and several other rapes in Arlington, Texas. Scheanette first killed elementary school teacher Christine Vu by strangling her in her bathtub on September 17, 1996, and later murdered Wendie Prescott on December 24, 1996. Between 1998 and 1999, Scheanette further raped five women who survived the attacks. Scheanette was eventually arrested in 2000 after police connected him to the murders of Prescott and Vu based on fingerprint evidence left at the scene. Scheanette was charged for both murders, but was solely found guilty of capital murder for the death of Prescott and sentenced to death in 2003. Scheanette was eventually executed on February 10, 2009.

== Personal life ==
Dale Devon Scheanette was born on May 7, 1973, in Ouachita Parish, Louisiana. Scheanette, who had a younger brother and sister, grew up in the rough areas of Monroe, including the Tanglewood Heights neighborhood. Scheanette attended schools in the Ouachita Parish School System, completing his education through the ninth grade, which was the highest grade recorded for him. School records indicate that he was frequently absent during his time in the system. His teachers and classmates recalled him as a well-behaved student and never had any disciplinary problems. Prior to his arrest for murder, Scheanette was reportedly found guilty of a minor traffic violation, but according to the state law enforcement officers from Louisiana, Scheanette did not have a criminal record for major offences apart from the traffic offence.

== Serial rape and murders ==
Between 1996 and 1999, Dale Scheanette committed two murders and at least five rapes of women, all in differing locations within Texas.

=== Murder of Christine Vu ===
On September 17, 1996, Scheanette first raped and killed 25-year-old Christine Huyen Vu. Inside her apartment in Arlington, Vu was attacked by Scheanette while inside her bathtub, and during the attack, Scheanette had tied her up with duct tape and raped her, before he strangled her to death. At the time of the murder, Vu was a third grade teacher and both Scheanette and his wife also lived in the same apartment block as the victim.

The body of Vu was found inside the bathtub by her boyfriend, who called the police. The police found that there were no signs of forced entry into the flat and none of the things inside the apartment were in disarray but were neat, and robbery was ruled out as a motive as there were no valuables stolen from the unit. While preliminary examination of the body showed minor signs of trauma but no obvious clues regarding the cause of death, the autopsy confirmed that Vu died as a result of "manual strangulation with drowning". Prior to Scheanette's arrest for the murder, Vu's boyfriend was originally a suspect but the police later found him to be innocent.

Background information showed that Vu was born in Vietnam on February 1, 1971, and was the second-eldest of five children (four girls and one boy), before they moved to the United States. According to her family, Vu was a "happy, loving child" and also a tomboyish girl who enjoyed playing leg wrestling with her only brother. One of her sisters described Vu to be an "almost perfect" child. Vu excelled in high school and later graduated from Texas Tech University in Lubbock, before she became a teacher at Bozeman Elementary School and Morton Elementary School, and both school staff members and students highly regarded Vu as a good teacher.

=== Murder of Wendie Prescott ===
On December 24, 1996, Scheanette killed his second victim, 22-year-old Wendie Rochelle Prescott, a teacher's aide working at Emma Nash Elementary School in Mansfield. Like Vu, Prescott lived in the same apartment block as Scheanette, and after entering Prescott's residence, Scheanette attacked Prescott in her bathtub and tied her up with duct tape. Prescott was consequently raped and killed by Scheanette, who left her naked body lying facedown in her partially filled bathtub.

On that same day, Prescott was supposed to go for a planned shopping trip with her sister, but she failed to show up and this made Prescott's uncle and aunt worry for her. On the night itself, Prescott's uncle came to her apartment, only to find her dead inside the bathtub. An autopsy certified that Prescott died from strangulation and drowning, and sperm samples were also collected for DNA testing.

During the investigations into the deaths of both Prescott and Vu, it was found that the two women suffered identical forehead wounds, which made them deduce that both victims were killed by the same perpetrator. Furthermore, as both victims were coincidentally teachers living in the same apartment complex despite working at different schools, there were fears among the public caused by the killings.

=== Rape cases ===
On September 21, 1998, at an apartment block in Lancaster, Texas, Scheanette raped a woman after he broke into her residential unit.

On October 2, 1998, a female Dallas police officer returned home from work, but she was attacked and raped at gunpoint by Scheanette, who had earlier broke into her home and also stole her police gun to point at her during the rape.

On December 18, 1998, Scheanette covered his face and forced his way into a first-floor apartment in Lancaster, and raped a woman living inside the unit.

On February 22, 1999, a university student of UT Arlington was attacked, assaulted and raped by Scheanette inside her sorority house.

On October 26, 1999, in Grand Prairie, Texas, Scheanette entered a 22-year-old woman's apartment through the glass sliding door and subsequently attacked and raped her.

== Arrest ==
On September 5, 2000, Arlington police officers arrested Dale Scheanette as a suspect behind the unsolved murders of both Christine Vu and Wendie Prescott, after the FBI database linked Scheanette's fingerprints to the ones found at the apartments of both Vu and Prescott. DNA tests also connected Scheanette to not only the murders of Prescott and Vu, but also at least five unsolved rape cases.

According to sources, a year prior to his arrest for the murders, Scheanette was caught on March 7, 1999, for committing a burglary in DeSoto, Texas. As a result, Scheanette's fingerprints were being recorded and uploaded into the FBI database and it ultimately led to the breakthrough in investigations that matched Scheanette's fingerprints and DNA to the ones found at the scene of both the murders.

After his arrest, Scheanette was charged with two counts of capital murder for the deaths of both Christine Vu and Wendie Prescott, as well as multiple counts of rape for the cases he was linked to. Under Texas state law, if found guilty of capital murder, Scheanette would be sentenced to death or life imprisonment without the possibility of parole for 40 years.

== Trial ==
On November 17, 2000, a Tarrant County grand jury formally indicted Scheanette for two counts of capital murder and two counts of rape.

On April 2, 2001, the prosecution had expressed their intent to seek the death penalty for Scheanette.

On September 2, 2002, jury selection for the trial of Dale Scheanette began.

On January 5, 2003, Dale Scheanette stood trial for one count of capital murder pertaining to the killing of Wendie Prescott. The other charge of capital murder for Christine Vu's death and other rape charges were not processed for trial at this point.

On January 8, 2003, the jury found Scheanette guilty of capital murder. In response to the guilty verdict, Prescott's uncle, who raised her since she was three years old, stated that they finally "crossed one hurdle", although he stated that his niece could not come back to life and there was no closure. Vu's brother and relatives were also relieved to hear that Scheanette was found guilty.

During the sentencing phase, the prosecution sought the death penalty, seeking to prove that Scheanette's involvement in multiple rapes and the murder of Christine Vu made him deserve the death penalty, and state prosecutor David Hagerman described him as "evil". The defence, however, asked for life imprisonment, and both Scheanette's mother and sister sought mercy for him, with the latter quoted, "God is the only giver and taker of life." At least two of the rape victims also came to court to testify about their traumatic experiences in court.

On January 16, 2003, Scheanette was sentenced to death upon the jury's unanimous recommendation for capital punishment.

== Execution ==
=== Appeals ===
On September 15, 2004, the Texas Court of Criminal Appeals rejected Dale Scheanette's direct appeal against his death sentence and murder conviction.

On April 14, 2005, the Texas Court of Criminal Appeals granted Scheanette his appeal and sent his case back to the lower courts for review.

On March 26, 2007, Scheanette lost his appeal to the 5th U.S. Circuit Court of Appeals.

On August 28, 2007, Scheanette was scheduled to be executed on November 27, 2007.

On October 18, 2007, a federal judge granted Scheanette a stay of execution while pending another appeal. Similarly, Allen Bridgers, another convicted murderer scheduled for execution in the same month as Scheanette, was also granted a stay of execution.

=== Lethal injection ===
Two years after his execution was stayed, Scheanette's death sentence was rescheduled to be carried out on February 10, 2009.

As a final recourse to avoid his execution, Scheanette appealed to the Texas Board of Pardons and Paroles for clemency, but by a unanimous vote of 7–0, the parole board denied clemency and hence refused to commute his death sentence to life without parole. Scheanette also filed several appeals to the federal appellate courts to challenge his death sentence, but none of them were successful. The last of which was denied by the U.S. Supreme Court less than an hour before his execution would proceed.

On February 10, 2009, 35-year-old Dale Devon Scheanette was put to death by lethal injection at the Huntsville Unit. Prior to his execution, Scheanette did not choose any witnesses for his execution, and reportedly, six relatives of the two murder victims, Wendie Prescott and Christine Vu, came to witness Scheanette's execution. Scheanette's last statement was, "Is the mic on? My only statement is that no cases have ever tried have been error free. Those are my words. No cases are error free. You may proceed Warden." Scheanette was pronounced dead at 6:21pm, nine minutes after the drugs were administered to him.

For his last meal, Scheanette ordered two spicy fried leg quarters, french fries and ketchup and two spicy fried pork chops.

== Aftermath ==
19 years after Dale Scheanette first killed Christine Vu and Wendie Prescott, in 2015, one of the rape victims accepted an interview to speak about her traumatic encounter with Scheanette. She revealed that she was unable to sleep for a period of time before seeing the news of Scheanette's arrest, and also struggled with depression, divorce, and self doubt. The woman also revealed that she was full of guilt that she survived while both Vu and Prescott died at the hands of her attacker. Gradually, she was able to slowly walk out of her dark past by telling her story and made a website to empower women, with hopes that her story could inspire healing for victims, and help them overcome their pain and find peace. A 2025 news report updated that the woman had since started a charity called "Rip the Bandage" to help rape survivors.

True crime series Dateline NBC re-enacted the case of Dale Scheanette and aired the episode on June 7, 2024.

== See also ==
- Capital punishment in Texas
- List of people executed in Texas, 2000–2009
- List of people executed in the United States in 2009
