= Crime of Cuenca =

Series of judicial miscarriages

The crime of Cuenca consisted of a series of judicial miscarriages and police misconduct that involved torture and prison sentences for two men, León Sánchez and Gregorio Valero, for a crime that never occurred. The alleged crime related to the disappearance of José María Grimaldos, a shepherd in the Spanish province of Cuenca in 1910.

== Background ==
In 1910, José María Grimaldos López, a 28-year-old shepherd from Tresjuncos, went missing. He was nicknamed El Cepa (the stump), apparently due to his low height and lack of intelligence. He worked at the farm of Francisco Antonio Ruiz, and was constantly mocked by the farm manager, León Sánchez, and also by the security guard Gregorio Valero. On August 20, 1910, Grimaldos sold a number of sheep belonging to him; subsequently, he disappeared. Later it was found that he had gone to bathe at La Celadilla, a shallow lagoon where bathers covered themselves in mud reputed to have curative properties. La Celadilla is in the municipality of El Pedernoso about 4 kilometres (2.5 miles) from the town.

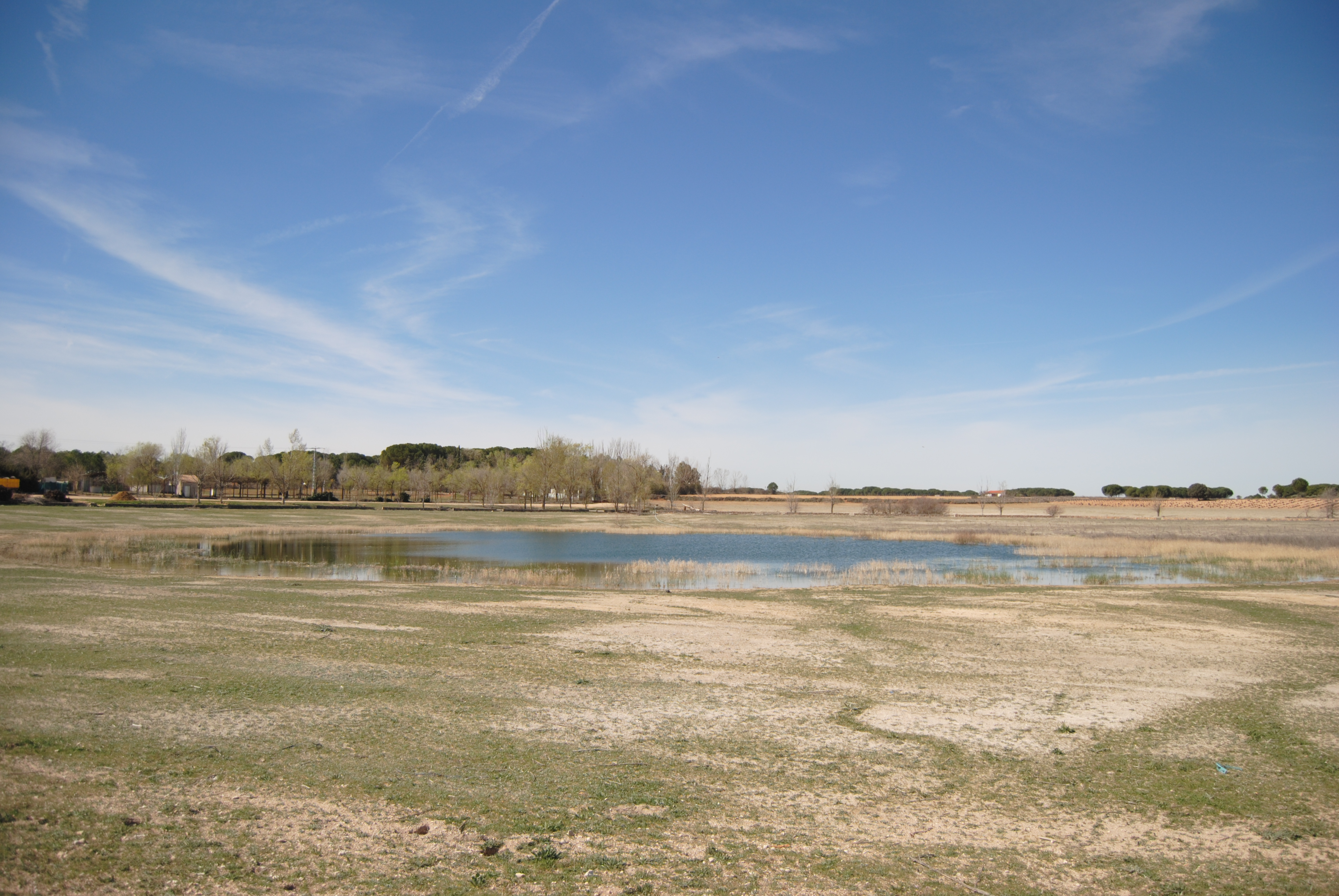
La Celadilla, an example of an endorheic lake.

After several weeks of Grimaldos' disappearance, rumours started to spread around the village about his possible murder, with the assumption that he was murdered by someone who wanted to steal the money he had earned from the sheep sale. His family knew about the taunts that Grimaldos received—as he often talked about them at home—so decided to file a complaint over the disappearance in the court of Belmonte, accusing Sánchez and Valero of being the suspected perpetrators of the alleged crime. The two were arrested and put on trial; in September 1911, the case was dismissed. After the interrogation of the detainees, the summary of evidence was heard and the judge released the defendants due to the lack of evidence.

== New prosecution and imprisonment ==
In 1913, at the insistence of the Grimaldos' relatives, the case was reopened. With the arrival in town of a new judge, Emilio Isasa Echenique, Grimaldos' family reported the case again. Once again an arrest warrant was served on the same suspects.

The Civil Guard began torturing and mistreating the detainees to obtain confessions from the defendants and to discover what they had done with the missing corpse. On November 11, 1913, when following the judge of Belmonte's order, the judge of Osa de la Vega certified the death stating that José María Grimaldos López, native of Tresjuncos, died on August 21, 1910, between 8.30 pm and 9.00 pm, murdered by Gregorio Valero and León Sánchez. The record reflects note in the margin: "The body could not be identified because it has not been found".

In 1918, after being in prison for four and a half years, the trial began against the defendants with a summary filled with contradictions and unclarified aspects. The trial ended with a sentence that condemned the defendants to 18 years of prison by order of the Provincial Court.

The court who sentenced the defendants deliberated for thirty minutes, and the twelve members composing the jury judged them responsible for the death of Grimaldos. The defendants managed to avoid the death penalty, which at the time would have been by garrote. Valero served time in the prison of San Miguel de los Reyes in Valencia, whereas Sánchez served his sentence in the prison of Cartagena.

== Reprieve ==
On July 4, 1925, Valero and Sánchez left jail after serving 12 years and two months of their sentence, as a consequence of two decrees of pardon.

== Reappearance of José María Grimaldos ==
On February 8, 1926, the priest of Tresjuncos received a letter from the priest of the municipality of Mira (113 kilometres or 70 miles), who requested the baptism certificate of José María Grimaldos in order to celebrate his marriage. The priest of Tresjuncos, astonished by the news, decided not to respond to the priest of Mira. After some time, José María Grimaldos became impatient with the delay to his marriage and set off for Tresjuncos. When he showed up in the village, the villagers could not believe what they saw. The judge of Belmonte then interceded and ordered the arrest of the man. Within hours, the press released the news, and it had a huge impact on public opinion.

After the indisputable identification of Grimaldos, the Minister of Grace and Justice ordered the retrial of the case and ordered the prosecutor of the Supreme Court to appeal for revision against the sentence of the hearing of Cuenca. On the aforementioned order it is noted that "there are reasonable grounds to believe that the confession of Valero and Sánchez, essential basis of their convictions, were extracted under exceptional continuous violence".

== Aftermath ==
The Supreme Court declared the ruling issued in Cuenca in 1918 void. (Note: Supreme Court judgement: "given the error of fact that motivated the sentence, it is declared void, for it punished a crime that was not committed, thus confirming the innocence of Gregorio Valero and León Sánchez". Sentence from the retrial. July 10, 1926.) As well as establishing Sánchez and Valero's innocence, the supreme court established the nullity of José María Grimaldos' death certificate and established the corresponding compensations that the State had to pay to the prisoners in such cases. In 1935, the two were granted a lifetime pension of 3,000 Spanish pesetas per year, including 5 years of retroactive payments.

A trial was held of those held responsible for the miscarriage of justice.

Sánchez and Valero moved to Madrid; there, they were offered jobs as security guards in the city hall.

== In literature and theater ==
The writer Ramón J. Sender wrote the novel El lugar de un hombre (1939). The writer Luis Esteso y López de Haro, native of San Clemente, Cuenca, wrote some four-lined stanzas with the name El Crimen de Cuenca, which were edited in one of his numerous collections (Madrid, G. Hernández and Galo Sáez, 1927).

== Podcasts and documentaries ==
The historical true crime podcast In Search of Lost Crime made an episode about the Crime of Cuenca called The Lost Shepherd.

Pilar Miró, the producer, made a film in 1979 entitled The Crime of Cuenca; it was scripted by Lola Salvador Maldonado, who also narrates the facts in a book published with the same name by the editorial Argos Vergara. The film makes a strong plea against torture and it is perfectly understood that the crime the title refers to is the one committed by the Civil Guard by torturing the suspects. The mathematician Carlos Maza Gómez also studies the case in his book Crímenes in 1926.

== See also ==
- Santiago Corella
- Forced disappearance
- Lists of solved missing person cases
- Perverting the course of justice
- Presumption of innocence

== Bibliography ==
- Ángel Luis López Villaverde, El crimen de Cuenca en treinta artículos: antología periodística del error judicial. University of Castilla–La Mancha, 2010.
