= Mercedes Sampietro =

Spanish actress

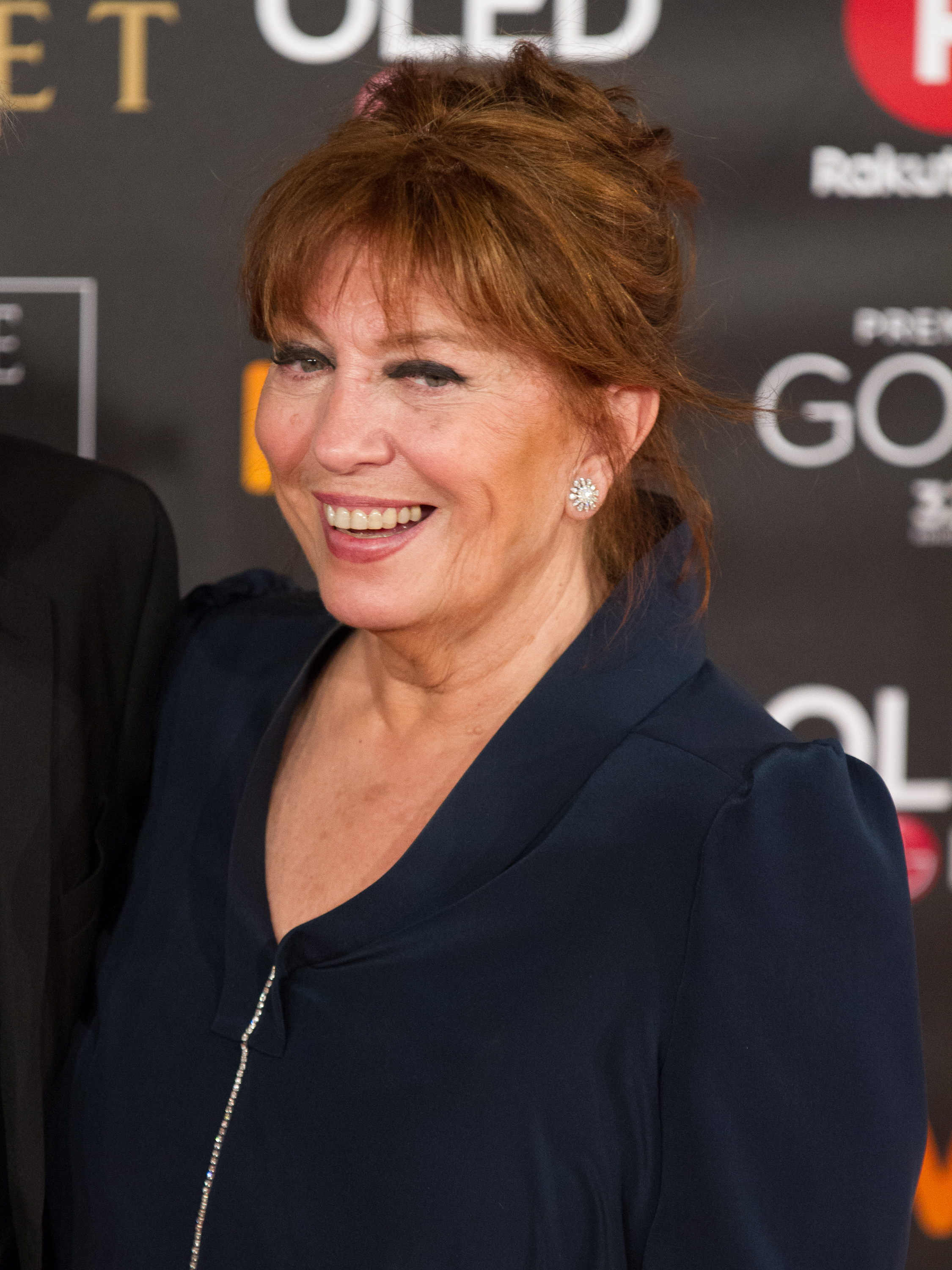
- At the 32nd Goya Awards in 2018
- Born: Mercedes Sampietro Marro; 24 January 1947 (age 79); Barcelona, Spain
- Other name: Mercè Sampietro
- Years active: 1970-

Mercedes Sampietro Marro (born 24 January 1947) is a Spanish actress.

== Biography ==
Mercedes Sampietro Marro was born in Barcelona on 24 January 1947. She began her career as a stage actress in 1970. Having performed as a voice actress in a number of films, she made her film debut onscreen in Jaime Chávarri's To an Unknown God (1977). She has worked five times with Pilar Miró. In 1981 she won the award for Best Actress at the 12th Moscow International Film Festival for her role in Gary Cooper, Who Art in Heaven.

She won a Goya Award for Best Actress for her role in the 2002 Argentine-Spanish film Common Ground, performing Liliana Rovira, a social worker, daughter to Spanish Republican exiles who settled in Argentina.

She has dubbed actresses including Meryl Streep, Diane Keaton, Kim Basinger, and Catherine Deneuve.

Sampietro was the recipient of the 2003 National Cinematography Prize in Spain.

She served as the president of the Academy of Cinematographic Arts and Sciences of Spain from 9 October 2003 to 18 December 2006.

== Filmography ==
- 2018
  - Fugitiva
  - If I Hadn't Met You
- 2007
  - La noche que dejó de llover
  - La buena nueva
  - El hombre de arena
  - Vida de familia
- 2006
  - Va a ser que nadie es perfecto
  - 53 días de invierno
  - La edad de la peseta
  - Salvador (Puig Antich), de Manuel Huerga
- 2005
  - Reinas, de Manuel Gómez Pereira
  - Obaba, de Montxo Armendáriz
  - Nordeste
- 2004
  - Inconscientes
  - Febrer
  - El año del diluvio (voz)
  - Cuadrilátero
- 2003
  - Buscando a Nemo (voz)
  - No matarás
  - Bala perdida
- 2002 – Lugares comunes
- 2001 – Silencio roto, de Montxo Armendáriz
- 2000
  - Dinosaurio (voz)
  - Nosotras
  - Sé quién eres
- 1999
  - Cuando vuelvas a mi lado
  - Las huellas borradas
  - Tarzán (voz)
  - Segunda piel
  - Saïd
- 1998 – Bert
- 1997 – La herida luminosa
- 1995 – Historias del Kronen, de Montxo Armendáriz
- 1994 – Dame fuego
- 1993 – El pájaro de la felicidad, de Pilar Miró
- 1991 – Beltenebros (dubber of voice), de Pilar Miró
- 1989
  - Montoyas y tarantos
  - La blanca paloma
  - La banyera
  - Caminos de tiza
- 1988
  - Sinatra
  - Qui t'estima, Babel?
  - Lluvia de otoño
- 1987 – Pehavý Max a strasidlá
- 1986
  - Werther, de Pilar Miró
  - Virtudes Bastián
- 1985
  - Extramuros
  - El anillo de niebla
- 1984 – La última rosa
- 1983
  - Percusión
  - Vivir mañana
- 1982
  - Estoy en crisis
  - Hablamos esta noche
  - La leyenda del tambor
  - El ser
- 1980
  - Gary Cooper, que estás en los cielos, de Pilar Miró
  - El crimen de Cuenca, de Pilar Miró
- 1978 – ¿Qué hace una chica como tú en un sitio como éste?
- 1977 – A un dios desconocido

== Awards and nominations ==
Year	Award	Category	Title	Result
1981	Fotogramas de Plata	Best Spanish Performer	Gary Cooper, que estás en los cielos	Won
1981	Moscow International Film Festival	Best Actress	Gary Cooper, que estás en los cielos	Won
1981	Taormina International Film Festival	Bronze Mask Award	Gary Cooper, que estás en los cielos	Won
1985	San Sebastián International Film Festival	Best Actress	Extramuros	Won
1986	Fotogramas de Plata	Best Movie Actress	Extramuros	Nominated
1987	Premios ACE	Best Actress	Extramuros	Won
1992	Fotogramas de Plata	Best TV Actress	Una hija mas	Nominated
1993	Ondas Awards	Best Acting	El pájaro de la felicidad	Won
2000	Cinema Writers Circle Awards	Best Actress	Be My Side Again	Nominated
2000	Goya Awards	Best Actress	Be My Side Again	Nominated
2000	Turia Awards	Special Award	Be My Side Again	Won
2000	Catalan International Film Festival	Best Actress	Women	Won
2001	Butaca Awards	Best Film Actress	Silencio Roto	Won
2001	Toulouse Cinespaña	Special Mention	Silencio Roto	Won
2002	Cinema Writers Circle Awards	Best Supporting Actress	Silencio Roto	Won
2002	San Sebastián International Film Festival	Best Actress	Common Ground	Won
2003	Argentinean Film Critics Association	Best Actress	Common Ground	Nominated
2003	Butaca Awards	Best Film Actress	Common Ground	Won
2003	Cinema Writers Circle Awards	Best Actress	Common Ground	Won
2003	Fotogramas de Plata	Best Actress	Common Ground	Nominated
2003	Goya Awards	Best Actress	Common Ground	Won
2003	Gramado Film Festival	Best Actress	Common Ground	Won
2003	Sant Jordi Awards	Best Spanish Actress	Common Ground	Won
2003	Spanish Actors Union	Best Female Actress	Common Ground	Won
2005	Butaca Awards	Best Film Actress	Unconscious	Nominated
2005	Goya Awards	Best Supporting Actress	Unconscious	Nominated
2006	Butaca Awards	Best Film Actress	Obaba	Nominated
2008	Butaca Awards	Best Film Actress	53 días de invierno	Nominated
2008	Gijón International Film Festival	Nacho Martinez Award		Won
2009	Gaudí Awards	Best Short Film	Turismo	Won
2009	Málaga Spanish Film Festival	Best Short Film	Turismo	Won
2010	Murcia Week of Spanish Cinema	Primavera Award		Won
2011	Zapping Awards	Best Actress	La Riera	Nominated
