= Pedro Chacón =

Spanish mathematician and theologian

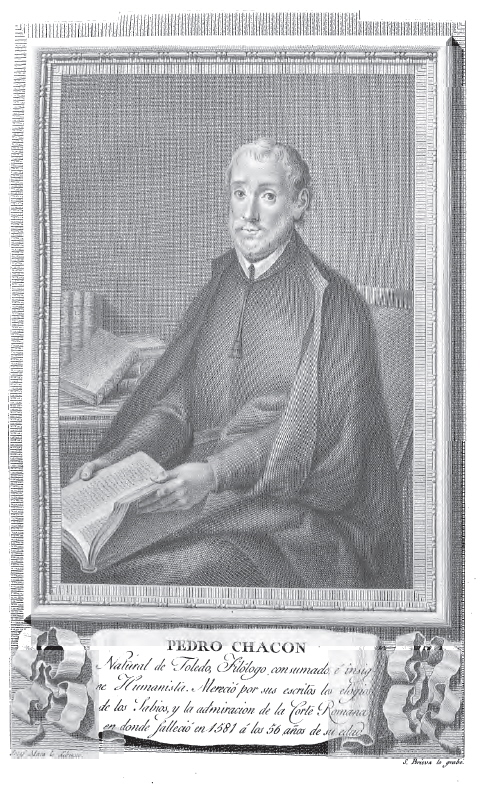
- Engraving by Simón Brieva from a drawing by José Maea
- Born: 1526; Toledo, Spain
- Died: 24 October 1581 (aged 54–55); Rome, Italy
- Other name: Petrus Ciacconius
- Occupations: Mathematician, theologian, Latinist
- Known for: Helped perform the mathematical work towards reform of the Julian Calendar
- Board member of: School of Salamanca

Pedro Chacón (b. c.1526 in Toledo – 1581 in Rome) was a Spanish mathematician and theologian.

== Life ==
He worked as professor of Greek at the University of Salamanca, whose history, consulting ancient documents in the library, he published in 1569. In Salamanca he was part of the School of Salamanca, a notable group of professors which also included Francisco de Salinas and Fray Luis de León.

By 1572 he had moved to Rome, where he been summoned by Pope Gregory XIII to do mathematical work towards reform of the Julian Calendar. As part of this work, in 1577 he wrote the Compendium Novae Rationis Restituendi Kalendarium, a description of the calendar reform proposal of Aloysius Lilius, upon which the Gregorian calendar would be based. Whilst in Rome he also studied classical sources.

== Works ==
- Kalendarii Romani veteris Julii Cœsaris aetate marmori incisi explanatio.
- Tractatus de Ponderibus et Mensuris M. S.
- De Nummis libri III.
- Commentaria de Nummis tam Grœcorum et Latinorum quam Hispanorum et Italorum.
- In Decretum Gratiani correctiones.
- In S. Hieronymum, S. Hilarium, et S. Ambrosium Nota quœdam.
- De Triclinio sive de Modo convivandi apud prisco Romanos… accedit Fulvi Ursini Appendix, & Hier. Mercurialis, De accubitus in cena antiquorum origine dissertatio. Amsterdam : Andreas Frisius, 1664. Amsterdam, Henry Wetstein, 1689. – his most famous work, looking at the eating habits of the ancient Romans, along with their food, drink, wine, guests, etiquette, table dressing and background music for eating.
- Chacón, Pedro; Torres, Ana María Carabias (1990). Historia de la Universidad de Salamanca hecha por el maestro Pedro Chacón [History of the University of Salamanca written by the teacher Pedro Chacón] (in Spanish). Ediciones de la Universidad de Salamanca.
