= Mary Carrillo =

Spanish actress (1919–2009)

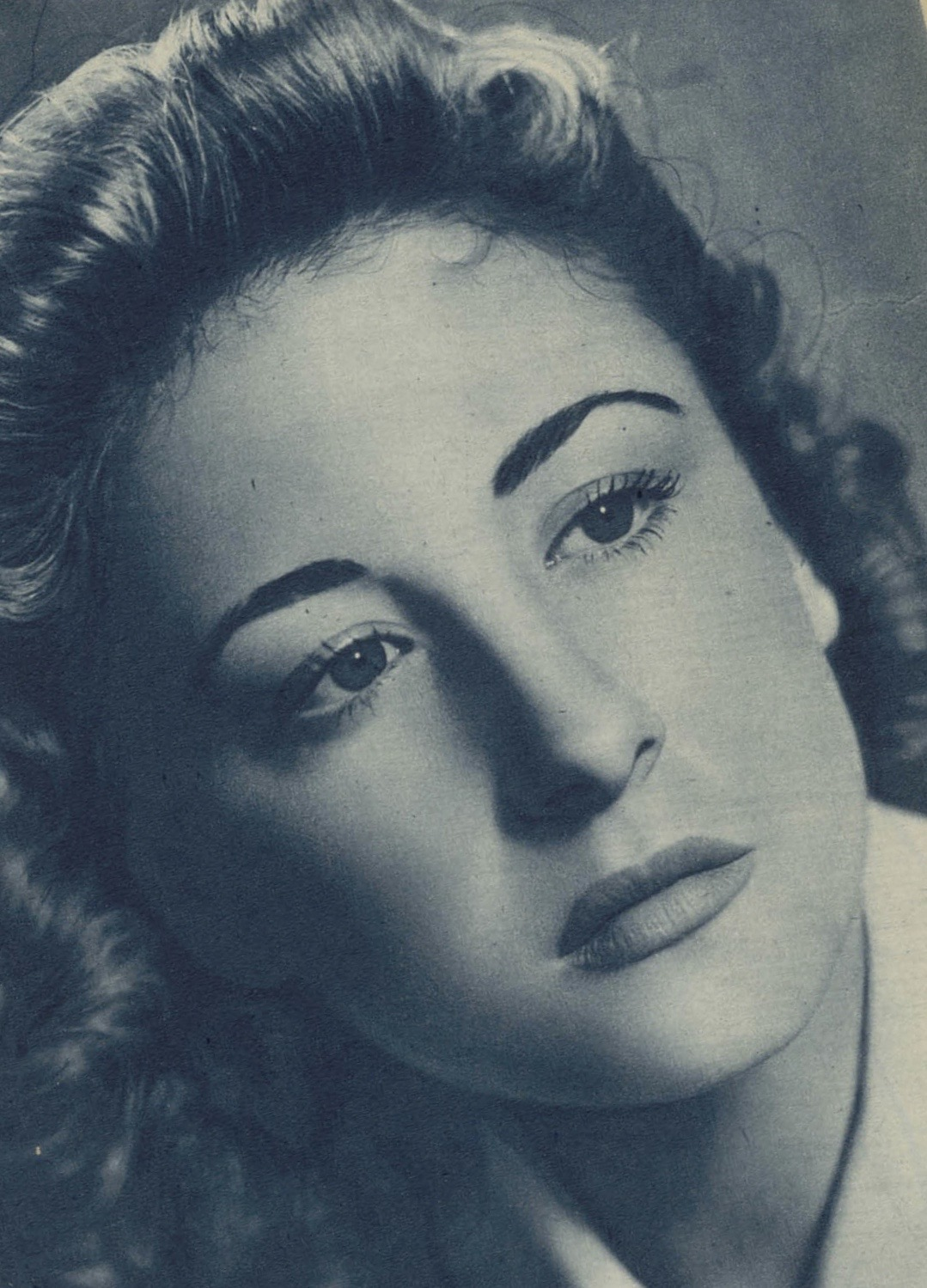
- Mary Carrillo
- Born: María Carrillo Moreno; 14 October 1919; Toledo, Spain
- Died: 31 July 2009 (aged 89); Madrid, Spain
- Occupation: Actress
- Years active: 1937-2002

María Carrillo Moreno (14 October 1919 - 31 July 2009) better known as Mary Carrillo was a Spanish actress. She appeared in more than fifty films from 1937 to 2002.

== Biography ==
Considered one of the great actresses of the Spanish stage in the 20th century, she debuted in 1936 in the Hortensia Gelabert Company, with the play El juramento de la primorosa and later in the Pepita Díaz-Manuel Collado Company (with whom she played Nuestra Natacha). At the beginning of the Spanish Civil War she went to Mexico and premiered Prohibido suicidarse en primavera with the Díaz-Collado Company. There she married, at the age of seventeen, at the National Theater of Havana, sponsored by Alejandro Casona, with the actor Diego Hurtado Álvarez.

Back in Spain, he resumed his theatrical career and made the film Marianela (1940 film), by Benito Perojo, inspired by the novel of the same name by Benito Pérez Galdós. After shooting three more feature films, he left the big screen until 1958.

In theater, he first joined the Company of María Bassó and Nicolás Navarro and in the early fifties he joined the Lope de Vega Company, directed by José Tamayo, where he interpreted the most important Spanish Golden Age and other titles of universal theater. With La vida es sueño, he traveled to Paris and participated in the I Festival del Teatro de las Naciones, in 1954, and won the Prize for Best Interpretation. That same year he proposed a text to Tamayo that Diego Hurtado had found, La Alondra, by Jean Anouilh. He also performed La florista de la reina, La santa hermandad and La santa virreina. In 1948, finally, she formed her own company. She was the fetish actress of theater director José Tamayo and author Antonio Gala. An anecdote reveals her tremendous quality on stage:Edward Albee, author of the original text of Who's Afraid of Virginia Woolf, saw her in Spain with Enrique Diosdado and directed by José Osuna and was so admired that he tried to convince the Metro to hire her for the film, but in the end Elizabeth Taylor took it.

In 1958 she returned to the cinema with Marco Ferreri's El pisito. In the following years a series of notable titles followed, in which Mari Carrillo displayed her great artistic ability especially in dramatic registers:The Crime of Cuenca, directed by Pilar Miró, La colmena and The Holy Innocents (film) (1984), by Mario Camus.... But also in comedy titles (Entre tinieblas, by Pedro Almodóvar).

In 1982 she triumphed with Dario Niccodemi's La enemiga. Her last appearance on stage was in a performance of Hora de visita, by José Luis Alonso de Santos. Retired from the stage since 1995, she died on July 31, 2009.

He had four daughters, among them the actresses and humorists Paloma, Teresa and Fernanda Hurtado, known artistically as Las Hermanas Hurtado. The oldest of his daughters was Alicia, who did not work in the artistic field; she worked in the airplane maintenance section of the Spantax company.

Mary Carrillo wrote at the age of 81 her memoirs in Sobre la vida y el escenario. She received, among others, the National Theater Award twice (1949 and 1961), the Círculo de Bellas Artes medal (also twice, in 1948 and 1982), the Ondas award in 1969 as best television actress, the Goya award in 1995 as best supporting actress for Más allá del jardín and the Unión de Actores award in 1995 for her professional career.

== Selected filmography ==
Year	Title	Role	Notes
1940	Marianela		
1943	Fever		
1960	El Pisito		
1980	The Crime of Cuenca		
1980	Gary Cooper, Who Art in Heaven		
1982	La colmena		
1983	Dark Habits		
1984	Akelarre		
1984	The Holy Innocents		
1989	Moon Child		
1996	Beyond the Garden		
