= Marianela (1940 film) =

- Directed by: Benito Perojo
- Written by: Benito Perojo; Joaquín Álvarez Quinter; Benito Pérez Galdós
- Starring: Mary Carrillo; Julio Peña
- Cinematography: Theodore J. Pahle
- Edited by: Antonio Cánovas
- Release date: 19 July 1940
- Running time: 1 hour 27 minutes
- Country: Spain
- Language: Spanish

Marianela is a 1940 Spanish drama film directed by Benito Perojo. It is based on the 1878 novel by Benito Pérez Galdós.

== Plot ==
The tragic story of Marianela, a poor and ugly girl, and Pablo, a man born blind who is in love with her. The action takes place between Socartes, mining town, and Aldeacorba, agricultural area, where Don Francisco Penáguila lives with her son Pablo. Life has been generous with mister Penáguila, but his whole well-being has been overshadowed by the blindness of his son. Pablo is happy beside his guide, a girl who everyone calls "Nela"; with her Pablo walks, talks and delights. Nela, meanwhile, a poor orphan who lives with the family of the mine foreman, mister Centeno, despised by all, incapable of anything useful, just feel joy accompanying Pablo. The souls of the two are so attuned that Pablo one day promises to marry her. The blind man thinks his guide must be extraordinarily beautiful, expression of his goodness. But now comes to Socartes the engineer's brother, Don Teodoro Golfín, famous ophthalmologist, and one of the reasons for his trip is to try to heal Pablo. Don Francisco de Penáguila ardently longs mister Golfín to see his son, who, although Pablo has been evicted by all the great doctors, he does not agree with the fate of his son to be incurable. Precisely his brother Manuel and he just inherited from a cousin, which still has to increase his fortune. Fortuna will not end, unless Pablo get the sense of sight, in which case the marriage would be held with his cousin Florentina, beautiful girl, daughter of Manuel. Pablo's operation and a successful outcome will lead to a dramatic end. "Nela", happy that Pablo regains his sight, but sad because she doesn't want that Pablo sees her, decides to leave. Doctor Golfín finds Nela dying and leads her to the house, where Pablo finally sees Marianela and the girl dies.

== Cast ==
- Mary Carrillo - Nela
- Julio Peña - Pablo
- Rafael Calvo - Teodoro Golfín
- Jesús Tordesillas - Pablo's Father
- Carlos Muñoz - Celipín
- María Mercader - Florentina
