= The Crime of Cuenca =

- Theatrical release poster
- Spanish: El crimen de Cuenca
- Directed by: Pilar Miró
- Screenplay by: Salvador Maldonado; Pilar Miró
- Produced by: Alfredo Matas
- Starring: Amparo Soler Leal; Héctor Alterio; Daniel Dicenta; José Manuel Cervino; Fernando Rey
- Cinematography: Hans Burman
- Music by: Antón García Abril
- Production companies: Incine; Jet Films
- Release dates: February 1980 (Berlinale); 17 August 1981 (Spain)
- Running time: 92 minutes
- Country: Spain
- Language: Spanish
- Box office: 460 million ₧

The Crime of Cuenca (Spanish: El crimen de Cuenca) is a 1980 Spanish drama film directed by Pilar Miró and based on an instance of miscarriage of justice, the crime of Cuenca, which took place in the early 20th century in the province of Cuenca. El crimen de Cuenca is the title of a book published at the same time by the author of the movie script, (Lola) Salvador Maldonado, in which she recounts the same facts.

== Historical facts ==
On 21 August 1910, in the small town of Osa de la Vega, in the province of Cuenca, José María Grimaldos, known as "El Cepa" (the stump), is seen on the road to the nearby village of Tresjuncos and then disappears.

His family fears foul play and reports it to the Guardia Civil. In the subsequent judicial investigation the family and others express their suspicions that two men, Gregorio Valero and León Sánchez had killed him for his money. This first case was closed in September 1911 with no convictions.

In 1913 a new, young and overzealous judge named Isasa arrives. Influenced by the local boss, Judge Isasa decides to reopen the case. The two suspects are arrested by the Guardia Civil and under torture, confess to having killed the man and destroyed the body. The fiscal (district attorney) asks for the death penalty for both. Finally, on 25 May 1918 a popular jury convicts the two men of murder and they are sentenced to 18 years in prison. After serving eleven years, they are released under a general pardon on 20 February 1924.

Two years later, in early 1926, it is discovered by chance that the reputed victim, Grimaldos, "El Cepa", was alive and had been living in a nearby town. The ugly truth is thus revealed and the innocence of the convicted men becomes evident.

With many legal difficulties, the case is reopened and eventually reached the Supreme Court, where the convictions were overturned.

== The film ==
Based on these facts, writer Ramón J. Sender wrote the novel El lugar de un hombre (The Place of a Man) in 1939 and later, in 1979, Pilar Miró directed the movie based on the story while Salvador Maldonado published her book.

The movie is an attack against torture and it is understood that the crime in the title is committed by the Guardia Civil in torturing the suspects.

The torture scenes are depicted in great detail and crudity.

== Cast ==
- Amparo Soler Leal as Varona
- Héctor Alterio as Isasa
- Daniel Dicenta as Gregorio Valerio Contreras
- Fernando Rey as Contreras, the political boss
- José Manuel Cervino as León Sánchez Gascón
- Mary Carrillo as Juana
- Francisco Casares as Taboada
- Eduardo Calvo as Amo
- José Vivó as Don Rufo
- Félix Rotaeta as Secretario
- Guillermo Montesinos as José María Grimaldos López «El Cepa»
- Pedro del Río as Álvarez-Neyra
- Mercedes Sampietro as Alejandra
- Nicolás Dueñas as Juez primero
- Antonio Canal as Labarga
- Juan Jesús Valverde as Jáuregui

== Release ==
The film was entered into the 30th Berlin International Film Festival in February 1980. It was initially banned in Spain and the director was court martialed for alleged slander against the Civil Guard. After the case passed to ordinary courts, the Audiencia Nacional eventually lifted the ban and the film was ensuingly released theatrically in Spain on 17 August 1981. It became the highest-grossing Spanish film in Spain with a gross of 460 million ₧, a record it held until surpassed by The Holy Innocents (1984).

== See also ==
- List of Spanish films of 1981
