= Fever (1943 film) =

1943 film

- Directed by: Primo Zeglio
- Written by: Corrado Alvaro
- Produced by: Manuel de Lara
- Starring: Paola Barbara; Carlo Tamberlani; Mary Carrillo
- Cinematography: Enzo Riccioni; Mariano Ruiz Capillas
- Edited by: Angelo L. Comitti; Juan Francisco García
- Music by: Jesús Guridi
- Production companies: Film Bassoli; Ufisa
- Distributed by: ENIC
- Release date: 19 May 1943
- Running time: 97 minutes
- Countries: Italy; Spain
- Language: Italian

Fever (Italian: Febbre; Spanish: Fiebre) is a 1943 Italian-Spanish drama film. I was directed by Primo Zeglio and starred Paola Barbara, Carlo Tamberlani and Mary Carrillo. It was made in Madrid as a co-production between the two countries, with separate versions produced in both languages. The film's sets were designed by the art director Pierre Schild.

== Cast ==
- Paola Barbara as Marga
- Carlo Tamberlani as Saverio Grantèr
- Mary Carrillo as Gianna
- María Martín as Lola
- Felice Romano as Pablo
- Jesús Tordesillas as L'avvocato
- Joaquín Bergía
- Ana María Quijada
- Juan Calvo
- Arturo Cámara
- José María Lado
- Antonio Bofarull
- Pedro Mascaró
- Ginés Gallego
- Jesús Castro Blanco

== Bibliography ==
- Chiti, Roberto & Poppi, Roberto. I film: Tutti i film italiani dal 1930 al 1944. Gremese Editore, 2005.
