= Gary Cooper, Who Art in Heaven =

1980 film

- Spanish: Gary Cooper, que estás en los cielos
- Directed by: Pilar Miró
- Written by: Antonio Larreta; Pilar Miró
- Starring: Mercedes Sampietro
- Cinematography: Carlos Suárez
- Release date: 17 November 1980
- Running time: 98 minutes
- Country: Spain
- Language: Spanish

Gary Cooper, Who Art in Heaven (Spanish: Gary Cooper, que estás en los cielos) is a 1980 Spanish drama film directed and co-written by Pilar Miró. It was entered into the 12th Moscow International Film Festival where Mercedes Sampietro won the award for Best Actress.

== Cast ==
- Mercedes Sampietro as Andrea Soriano
- Jon Finch as Mario
- Carmen Maura as Begoña
- Víctor Valverde (as Victor Valverde)
- Alicia Hermida as María
- Isabel Mestres
- José Manuel Cervino (as Jose Manuel Cervino)
- Mary Carrillo as Madre
- Agustín González as Álvaro (as Agustin Gonzalez)
- Fernando Delgado as Bernardo Ortega
- Amparo Soler Leal as Carmen
