= The Bird of Happiness (film) =

1993 film

- Theatrical release poster
- Directed by: Pilar Miró
- Written by: Mario Camus
- Produced by: Rafael Díaz-Salgado; José Luis Olaizola
- Starring: Mercedes Sampietro
- Cinematography: José Luis Alcaine
- Edited by: José Luis Matesanz
- Distributed by: United International Pictures
- Release date: 5 May 1993
- Running time: 115 minutes
- Country: Spain
- Language: Spanish

The Bird of Happiness (Spanish: El pájaro de la felicidad) is a 1993 Spanish drama film directed by Pilar Miró. It was screened in the Un Certain Regard section at the 1993 Cannes Film Festival.

It was nominated for the 1994 Goya Awards for Best Cinematography and Best Sound and won the Best Cinematography award (José Luis Alcaine).

== Cast ==
- Mercedes Sampietro - Carmen
- Aitana Sánchez-Gijón - Nani
- José Sacristán - Eduardo
- Carlos Hipólito - Enrique Jr.
- Lluís Homar - Fernando
- Daniel Dicenta - Enrique
- Mari Carmen Prendes - Madre
- Jordi Torras - Padre
- Asunción Balaguer - Señora Rica
- Ana Gracia - Chica Agencia
- Eulalia Ramón - Elisa
- Antonio Canal - Sergio
- Felipe Vélez - Asaltante
- Diego Carvajal - Mauro
- Rafael Ramos de Castro - Ayudante Dirección
- Gabriel Garbisu - Carlos
