= Luis de León =

Spanish poet and friar (1527–1591)

Fray Luis de León
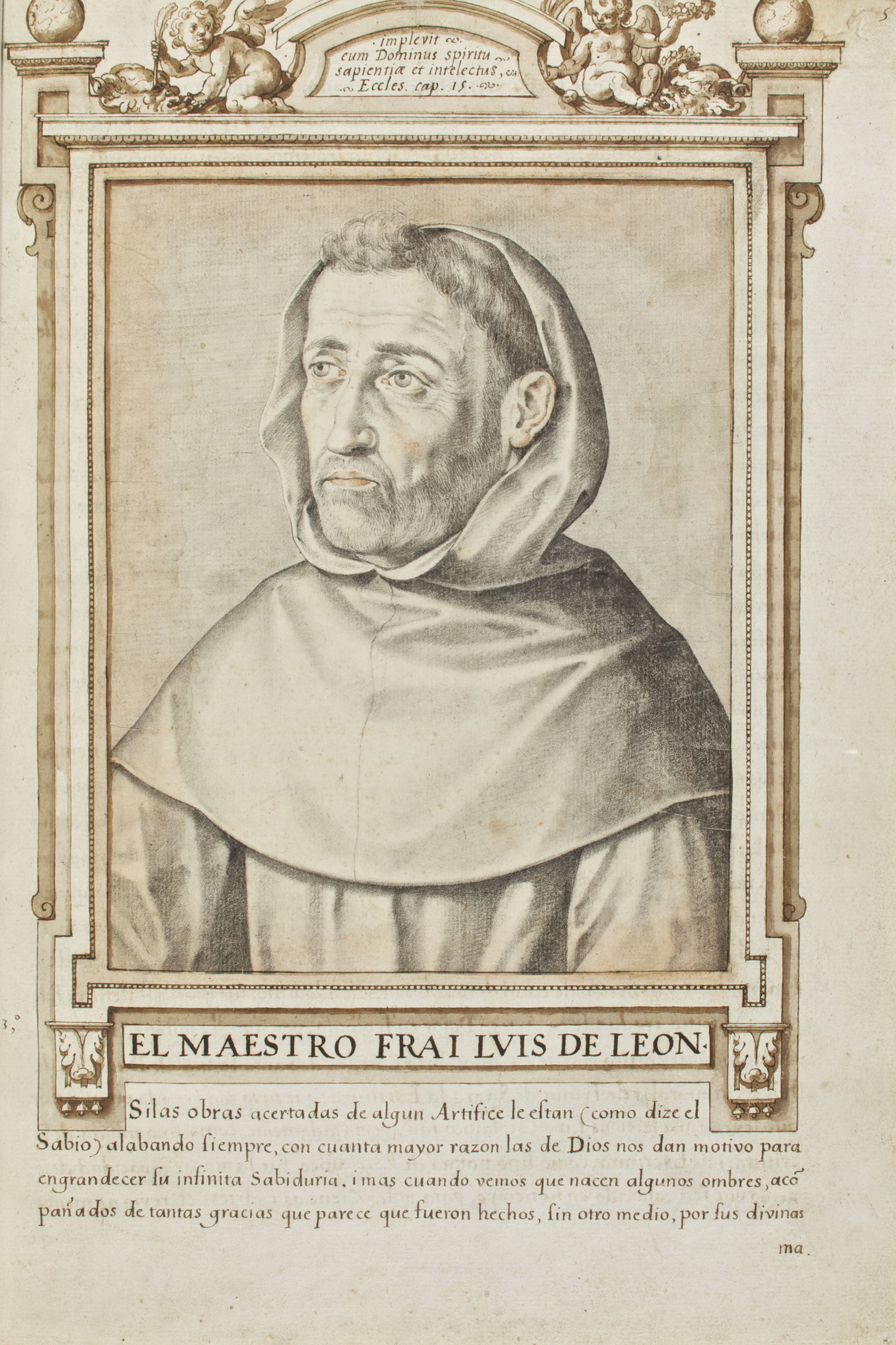
- An image of Luis, depicted by Francisco Pacheco c. 1599 in El libro de descripción de verdaderos retratos, ilustres y memorables varones (The book of description of real portraits, illustrious and memorable men).
- Born: 1527; Belmonte, Cuenca
- Died: 23 August 1591 (aged 63–64); Madrigal de las Altas Torres, Crown of Castile
- Education: University of Salamanca
- Occupations: Lyric poet, Augustinian friar, theologian and academic

Luis de León OESA (Belmonte, Cuenca, 1527 – Madrigal de las Altas Torres, Castile, Spain, 23 August 1591), was a Spanish lyric poet, Augustinian friar, theologian and academic.

While serving as professor of Biblical scholarship at the University of Salamanca, Fray Luis also wrote many immortal works of Spanish Christian poetry and translated both Biblical Hebrew poetry and Latin Christian poetry into the Spanish language. Despite being a devout and believing Roman Catholic priest, Fray Luis was descended from a family of Spanish Jewish Conversos and this, as well as his vocal advocacy for teaching the Hebrew language in Catholic universities and seminaries, drew false accusations from the Dominican Order of the heresies of being both a Marrano and a Judaiser. Fray Luis was accordingly imprisoned for four years by the Spanish Inquisition before he was ruled to be completely innocent of any wrongdoing and released without charge. While the conditions of his imprisonment were never harsh and he was allowed complete access to books, according to legend, Fray Luis started his first post-Inquisition University of Salamanca lecture with the words, "As I was saying the other day..."

According to Edith Grossman, "Fray Luis is generally considered the leading poet in the far-reaching Christianization of the Renaissance in Spain during the sixteenth-century. This means that as a consequence of the Counter-Reformation, and especially of the judgments and rulings of the Council of Trent, the secular Italianate forms and themes brought into Spain by Garcilaso were used by subsequent writers to explore moral, spiritual, and religious topics. The poets and humanists who were the followers of Fray Luis in the sixteenth-century formed the influential School of Salamanca."

== Early life ==
Luis de León was born in Belmonte, in the Province of Cuenca, in 1527 or 1528. His parents were Lope de León and Inés de Varela, and they had five children. His father practiced law, and it was due to his profession that the family moved to Madrid in 1534, and later to Valladolid.

Luis obtained a very thorough and extensive education and was devoted to the interpretation and translation of religious texts and ideas. He was proficient in Greek, Hebrew, and Latin.

He entered the University of Salamanca at the age of fourteen, in 1541, to study Canon Law under the care of his uncle Francisco. At some point between 1541 and 1543 (Thompson states that it was about 5–6 months after beginning his studies, while other authors often claim it was 1543), Luis abandoned his studies and instead entered the Order of the Hermits of St. Augustine. After a novitiate of uncertain duration, he joined the Priory of San Pedro on 29 January 1544. The first record of León as a student of theology is in the matriculation book at the University of Salamanca for 1546-7.

In 1552, Fray Luis graduated with a bachelor's degree in theology from the University of Toledo and continued his education as a student of Hebrew and Biblical interpretation at the University of Alcalá de Henares.

== Academic career ==
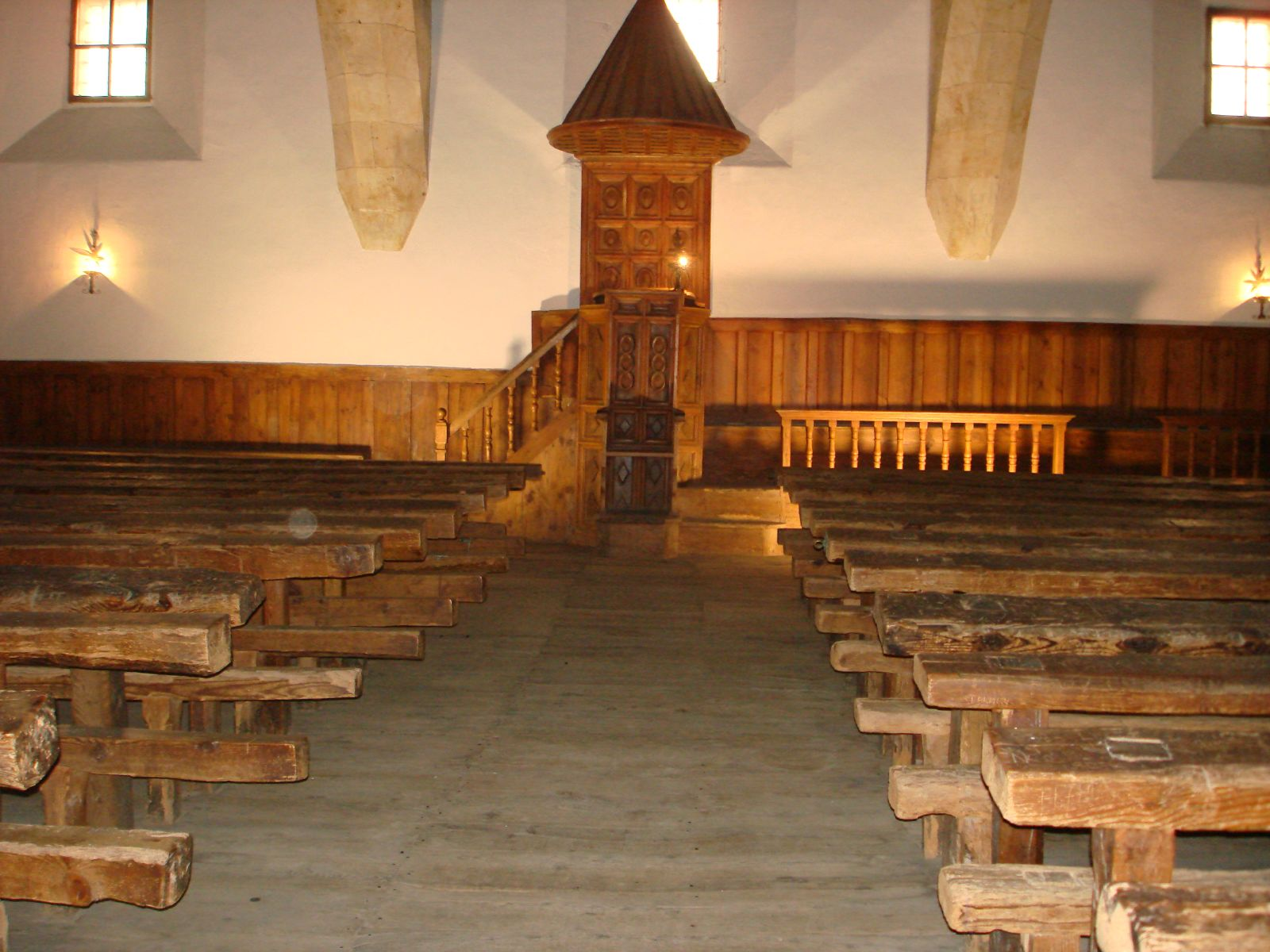
Hall of Fray Luis de León in the old building of the Universidad de Salamanca

Having returned to Salamanca the previous year, in 1560 he graduated from the University of Salamanca as a licentiate (7 May) and Master of Theology (30 June), and in the following year he won the election to the Chair of St Thomas, a chair in Theology, at the same university (Salamanca was unusual in that all Chairs were subject to an election for the position). This was a minor Chair, with a limited four-year tenure. In 1565, he won the Chair of St Durandus, to which he was re-elected in 1569 (he lost it in 1573 because he was in prison while the elections took place). In 1566, he was named administrator of the Augustinian College of San Guillermo in Salamanca, and in 1567, he took on the position of vice rector of the University. In 1571, he attained the Chair of Sacred Letters as well.

While at the university, he translated classical and biblical literature and wrote on religious themes. He was widely known for his works.

== Imprisonment ==
In 1571, Dominican professors Bartolomé de Medina and Castro put forth seventeen propositions to the Inquisition documenting Fray Luis' allegedly heretical opinions. His translation into Spanish and commentary of the Song of Solomon was the biggest evidence presented for their case against him. Another charge touched on his criticizing the text of the Vulgate.

As a result, he was imprisoned at Valladolid from 27 March 1572 until December 1576, fell ill and remained in bad health throughout his imprisonment. Though he suffered greatly from his isolation and less-than-desirable conditions, Fray Luis continued to actively write and study during his confinement.

At the end of 1576, the tables turned, and on 11 December, Fray Luis was cleared of all charges and released from prison with an admonishment to be more careful and reserved in his publications and speech. He returned to Salamanca on 30 December in triumph.

Tradition has it that he began his university lecture on 29 January 1577, his first after returning from four years' imprisonment, with the words Dicebamus hesterna die ("As we were saying yesterday....").

== Later life ==
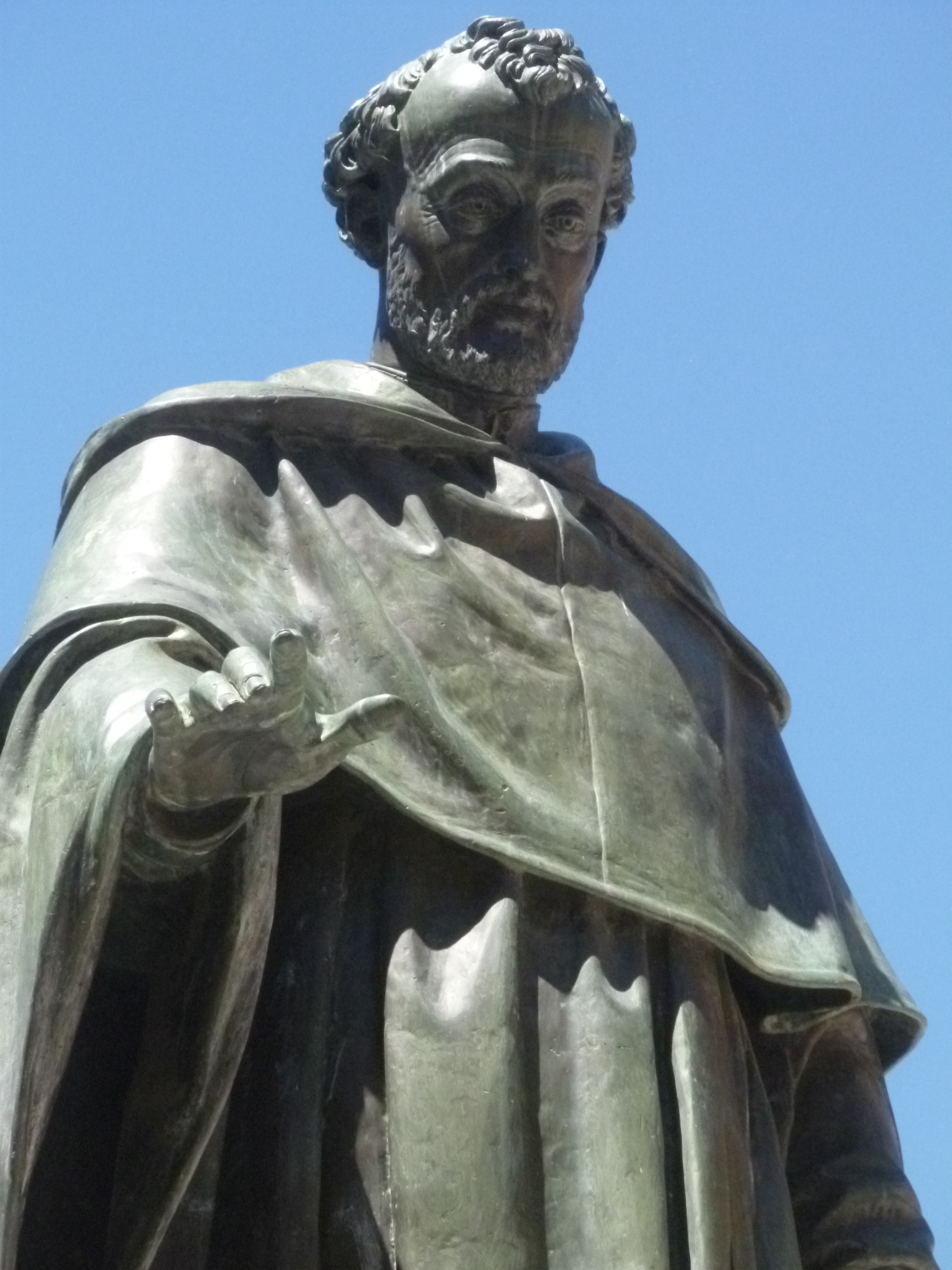
Statue of Fray Luis de León in Salamanca, Spain

Fray Luis continued to teach at the university, being awarded a special chair at the end of 1576, shortly after his acquittal. In 1578, he obtained, for life, the chair of Moral Philosophy, and in 1579 was elected to the most significant chair in the university, the Chair of Holy Scripture (sometimes known as the chair of Biblical Studies or the Bible Chair).

He went on to earn a Master of the Arts degree from the University of Sahagún.

Fray Luis did not pay heed to the cautionary admonishments of the Inquisitorial committee after his earlier imprisonment. In 1582, he had another Inquisitional run-in, following three disputations held on the subject of the merits of Christ and human predestination, but was not this time imprisoned. He was absolved two years later, in 1584.

Fray Luis's first published Spanish and Latin works emerged in 1580, some having been begun in prison; most of his works were printed during this decade. Between 1583 and 1585, he published the three books of his celebrated treatise, The Names of Christ, which he had written in prison. In 1583, the most popular of his prose works, The Perfect Wife, an instruction for newly married women, also appeared.

In 1588, Fray Luis published the first collected edition of the writings of Teresa of Ávila. To produce this work, he had performed the task of collating her manuscripts, checking references and notes, and preparing a definitive text (although Teresa and León were both in Salamanca in late 1570, it is not believed they ever met in their lifetimes).

He died at the age of 64 on 23 August 1591, in Madrigal de las Altas Torres, Ávila, and is buried in Salamanca in the Priory of San Agustín. Ten days before his death he was elected Vicar General of the Augustinian Order.

== Major works ==
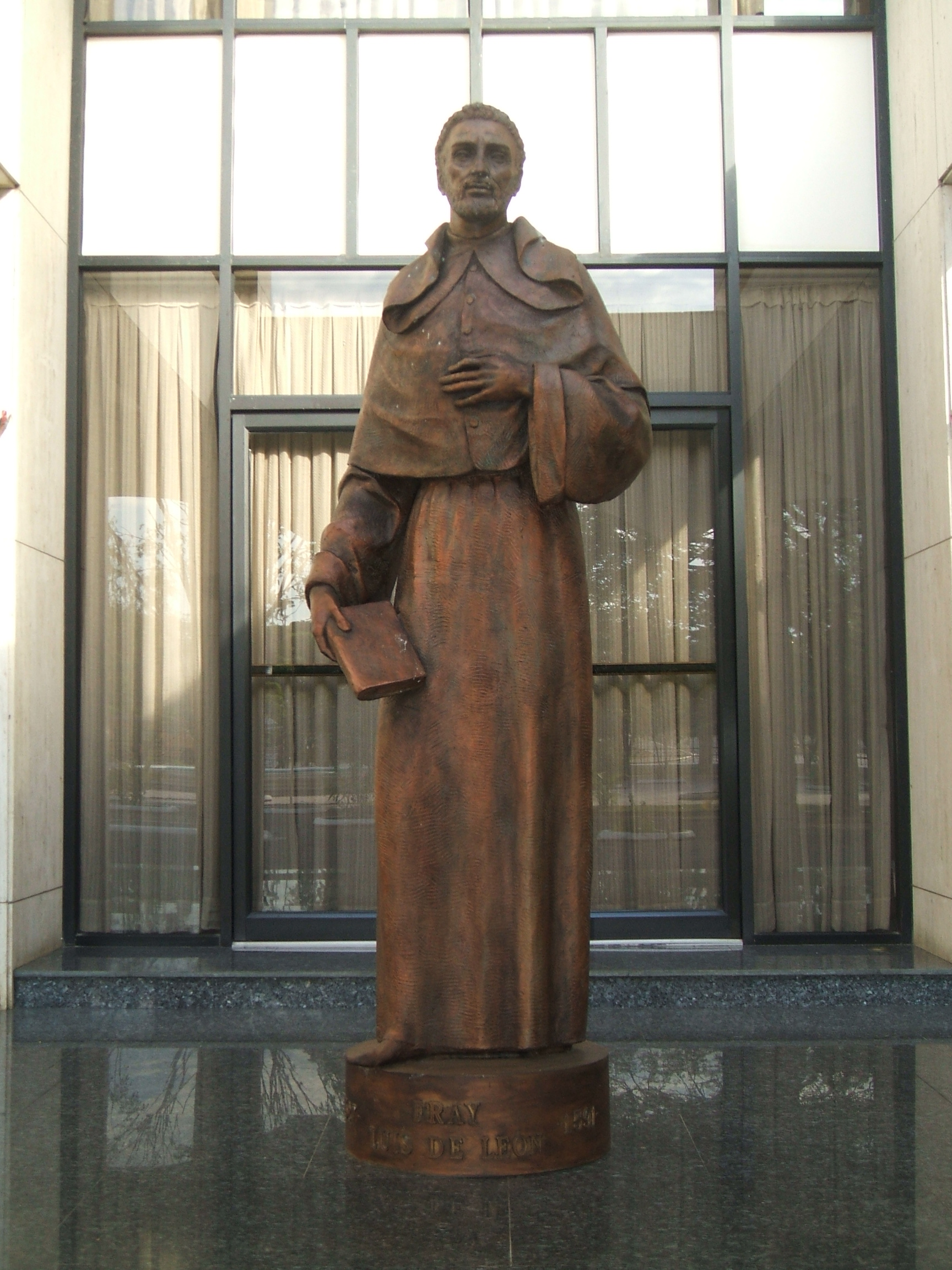
Statue of Fray Luis de León on display outside the Gran Teatro in Santiago de los Caballeros in the Dominican Republic.

=== Cantar de los Cantares (translation of Song of Songs) ===
In 1561, he began translating the Song of Songs into Spanish for his cousin, Isabel Osorio, a nun in Salamanca who could not read the Latin text, and wrote an accompanying commentary. This was León's first major translation of a biblical text and was probably inspired by a commentary his contemporary Arias Montano had lent to him when he passed through Salamanca in 1561.

Translation of biblical texts into Spanish had been banned by the Council of Trent, so there was a certain risk in this undertaking. The manuscript, however, was popular amongst his friends, who copied it and circulated it privately. However, the translations formed part of the accusations levelled against León when he was denounced to the Inquisition in 1572.

Because of the controversial nature of the text, it was not published until 1798.

=== In Cantica Canticorum Salomonis explanatio (Commentary on the Song of Solomon) ===
This was published in 1580 and built on an earlier Spanish commentary. He revised and enlarged it in a 1589 edition.

=== La Perfecta Casada (The Perfect Wife) ===
This book is Fray Luis’s interpretation of the Proverbs of Solomon, and was written as a moral exposition to his newly married young niece. It advises all young women on the proper behaviour and duties of a married woman, both in regard to her husband and her children. The book quickly became a popular wedding gift to young women of the era, as it was an instruction manual for marriage. In addition, this book was a revolutionary defence of women’s roles in society at the time. It was first published in 1583 and was popular, appearing in six editions by 1632.

=== De los Nombres de Cristo (The Names of Christ) ===
Another well-known work, this was written as a guide to the layman about the essential principles of the church. It is written in dialogue form about three friends who discuss fourteen of the Scriptural names of Christ over a period of two days in a country estate. Each book ends in a lyrical meditation expressed in a poem. The predominant theme is the centrality and universality of Christ.

The work grew by stages. The first edition of 1583 is made up of only two books, considering nine names in total. The second edition of 1585 adds a third book, considering four names, and adds the name 'shepherd' to the first book. Finally, the posthumous edition of 1595 includes one extra name, 'lamb'. The structure of the third edition was used for the 1984 English translation.

The work quickly became popular in Spain: seven editions were printed by 1605.

=== F Luysii Legionensis Augustiniani Theologiae Doctoris, & Divinorum Librorum primi apud Salmanticenses interpretis explanatiorum in eosdem ===
In 1589, Fray Luis published a volume of Latin commentaries on Obadiah, 2 Thessalonians, Galatians and the Song of Songs. These represent the summit of his achievement as a Biblical scholar.

=== Exposición del Libro de Job (Commentary on the Book of Job) ===
This is another contribution made by Fray Luis to make Scripture available to those who could not read Latin. In other words, he wanted ordinary people to be exposed to the Biblical message. The story tells of Job's patience and suffering, and also serves as a corrective guide to man's behaviour. It is written in both verse and dialogue to make it both enjoyable and informative. León began the work while in prison and had completed thirty-five chapters by the end of 1580. He resumed work on it ten years later and finished the work in 1591, a few months before his death. He dedicated the work to Mother Ana de Jesús, to whom John of the Cross had dedicated his Spiritual Canticle. Fray Luis had come to know her in recent years, both in preparing the first edition of the works of Teresa of Avila, and in defending the privileges of the Discalced Carmelite nuns against proposed changes in the Teresian constitution.

It was first published in 1779.

=== Twenty-three original poems in Spanish ===
Fray Luis composed a number of poems, the majority probably between 1559 and 1584. He did not publish them, but circulated them among his friends.

They were first published in 1631, when Quevedo printed them. The canon of Fray Luis's poetry, as fixed by Hispanists, consists of twenty-nine poems.

See two of his most well-known examples below: The Life Removed and Ode to Salinas.

== Poetry Selections ==
=== The Life Removed ===
In the poem The Life Removed, of which an excerpt is shown below, Fray Luis, following the beatus ille theme introduced by Horace, expounds upon the notion of choice and its consequences. He says that those irrational men who aspire to power and wealth and are guided by the talk and opinion of others will not achieve the peace, happiness, and liberty assured to those who travel the hidden path. The poem continues on to mention a ship in a storm, and how the sailors aboard are motivated only by greed and ambition, and they will not meet the harmonious end of those who travel the hidden path.

"La Vida Retirada"

¡Qué descansada vida
la del que huye el mundanal ruïdo
y sigue la escondida
senda por donde han ido
los pocos sabios que en el mundo han sido!

Que no le enturbia el pecho
de los soberbios grandes el estado,
ni del dorado techo
se admira, fabricado
del sabio moro, en jaspes sustentado.

No cura si la fama
canta con voz su nombre pregonera,
ni cura si encarama
la lengua lisonjera
lo que condena la verdad sincera.

Translation:

"The Life Removed"

How tranquil is the life
Of him who, shunning the vain world’s uproar,
May follow, free from strife,
The hidden path, of yore
Trod by the few who conned true wisdom’s lore!

For he with thoughts aloof
By proud men’s great estate is not oppressed,
Nor marvels at the roof
Of gold, built to attest
The Moor’s skill and on jasper piles to rest.

He cares not though his name
Be raised aloft, to winds of rumour flung,
He cares not for the fame
Of cunning flatterer’s tongue,
Not that which truth sincere would leave unsung.

— Peers 165

=== Ode to Salinas ===
Another well-known poem composed by Fray Luis is an ode written for his friend Francisco de Salinas. They frequently spoke about art and poetry, and listened to music together. Salinas was an organist and composer who shared Fray Luis's belief that music can make one more religious and that it inspires man to contemplate spiritual matters. The ode, an excerpt of which is listed below, includes numerous positive images about music as a means to contemplate the divine and to overcome ignorance and foolishness.

"Oda III - A Francisco de Salinas"

¡Oh, desmayo dichoso!
¡Oh, muerte que das vida! ¡Oh, dulce olvido!
¡Durase en tu reposo,
sin ser restituido
jamás a aqueste bajo y vil sentido!

A este bien os llamo,
gloria del apolíneo sacro coro,
amigos a quien amo
sobre todo tesoro;
que todo lo visible es triste lloro.

¡Oh, suene de contino,
Salinas, vuestro son en mis oídos,
por quien al bien divino
despiertan los sentidos
quedando a lo demás amortecidos!

Translation:

"Ode to Salinas"

O blessed swoon! O life-
bestowing death! O sweet oblivion!
Would that I could linger
in your bliss and never be restored
to this lower, viler sense.

Glory of Apollo's sacred choir,
I call you to this rapture,
friends I love
above all treasure,
for all the rest is but sad plaint.

O let your strains ring
always in my ears, Salinas,
by which my senses wake
to heavenly good
while to all else they stay asleep.

— Translated by M. Smith

== Later reputation ==
In subsequent centuries, Fray Luis was especially praised in Spain as a poet. In 1631, the poet Francisco de Quevedo prepared an edition of León's poems. In the eighteenth century he was the source of inspiration to various Neoclassical poets.

== See also ==
- Gilbert Luis Centina III
- Spanish Renaissance literature

== Modern translations ==
- The unknown light: the poems of Fray Luis de León, translation and introduction by Willis Barnstone, (Albany, 1979)
- Rivers, Elias L, Fray Luis de León: The Original Poems, (London: Grant & Cutler, 1983).
- Fray Luis de León, The Names of Christ, translation and introduction by Manuel Durán and William Kluback, (New York: Paulist Press, 1984) [translation of Nombres de Christo]
- A bilingual edition of Fray Luis de León's La perfecta casada: the role of married women in sixteenth-century Spain, translated and introduction by John A. Jones and Javier San José Lera, (Lewiston, NY; Lampeter, UK: E. Mellen, 1999)
- Luis de León, Luis de León: Ode to Francisco Salinas, trans Michael Smith, (Shearsman Books, 2006). .
