= Francisco de Salinas =

Spanish music theorist and organist

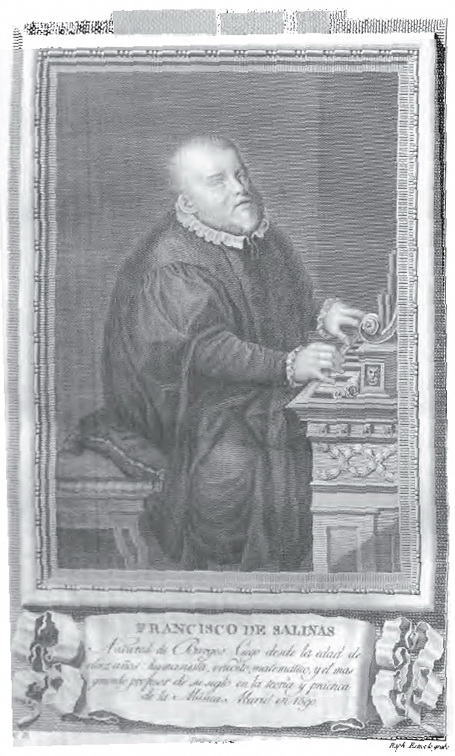
Francisco de Salinas.

Francisco de Salinas (1513, Burgos – 1590, Salamanca) was a Spanish music theorist and organist, noted as among the first to describe meantone temperament in mathematically precise terms, and one of the first (along with Guillaume Costeley) to describe, in effect, 19 equal temperament. In his De musica libri septem of 1577 he discusses 1/3-, 1/4- and 2/7-comma meantone tunings. Of 1/3-comma meantone, which is essentially identical to the meantone of 19-et, he remarks that it is "languid" but not "offensive to the ear", and he notes that a keyboard of 19 tones to the octave suffices to give a circulating version of meantone.

The 19th-century musicologist Alexander John Ellis maintained that Salinas really meant to characterize 1/6-comma meantone, and made a mistake due to his blindness. Others point out that Salinas's descriptions of his tuning as "languid" but not "offensive to the ear" seem to apply to 1/3-comma meantone, not to 1/6-comma meantone, which in any case has a much sharper fifth than musicians of Salinas's own time preferred.

Salinas was also interested in just intonation, and advocated a 5-limit just intonation scale of 24 notes he called instrumentum perfectum.

== Biography ==
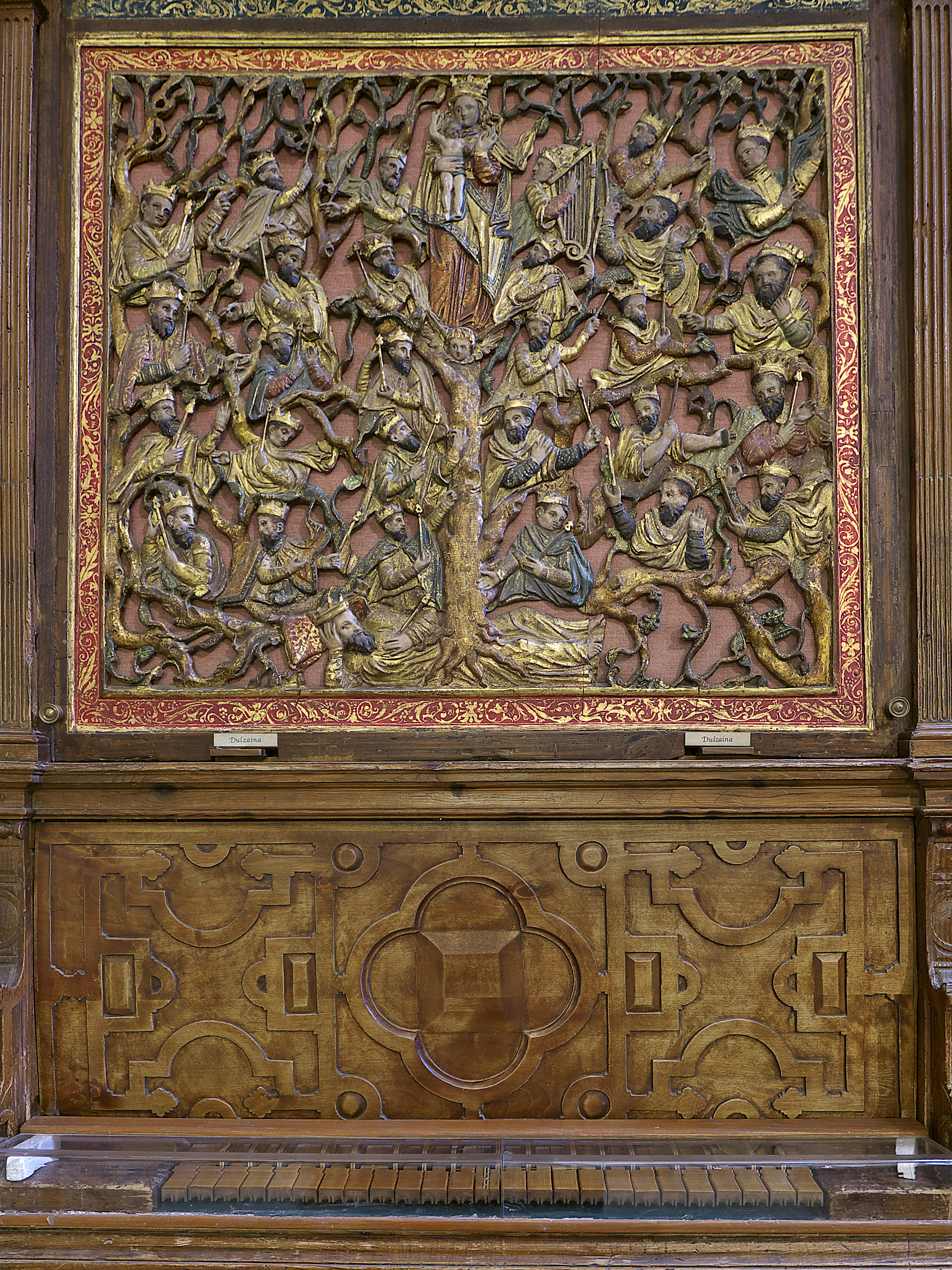
Organ of Francisco de Salinas at the Old Cathedral of Salamanca.

Salinas was born in Burgos in 1513, the son of the treasurer to emperor Charles I. He was blind from the age of eleven. He studied humanities, singing and organ at the University of Salamanca. He then entered the service of a relative, archbishop Pedro Sarmiento de Salinas, and accompanied him when Sarmiento followed emperor Charles to Rome in 1538. Sarmiento was elevated to the cardinalate that year, and Salinas took the holy orders and was granted an annual pension by Pope Paul III. Salinas lived in Rome for the next 23 years. In 1553, he became the organist at the court of Naples, where he was under the patronage of the then Viceroy of Naples, the Duke of Alba. While in Naples, he befriended Diego Ortiz, who served there as Kapellmeister; he also became acquainted with Orlando di Lasso and Tomás Luis de Victoria.

In 1559, he returned to Spain and took up a position as organist at the Cathedral of Sigüenza, where he worked until moving to a similar position at the Cathedral of León in 1561. In 1567 he took up the professorship of music at the University of Salamanca, where he met the celebrated poet Fray Luis de León, also a professor at the university. In 1571, alongside Fray Luis de León and Diego de Castilla (then the rector of the University of Salamanca), he formed part of the jury for the literary prize that had been organised to celebrate the Spanish victory at the Battle of Lepanto and the birth of prince Ferdinand. Fray Luis de Leon admired Salinas greatly, and in 1577 wrote a famous ode, the Oda a Francisco Salinas, in homage to the musician.

Most of Salinas' work was published while he worked at Salamanca. In 1577 he authored his treatise De Musica libri septem, where he described meantone temperament for the first time. He taught Vicente Espinel, who later said of Salinas that he was "the most learned man in speculative music that the world has known since antiquity." Although by all accounts a highly reputed organist, all of his own compositions have been lost. He died at Salamanca in 1590.
