= Febrer =

Febrer is a surname. Notable people with the surname include:

- Andreu Febrer (1370×1374 – 1437×1444), Catalan soldier, courtier and poet
- Gabriel Mascaró Febrer (born 1944), Spanish racing cyclist
