= Tresjuncos =

Tresjuncos, Spain
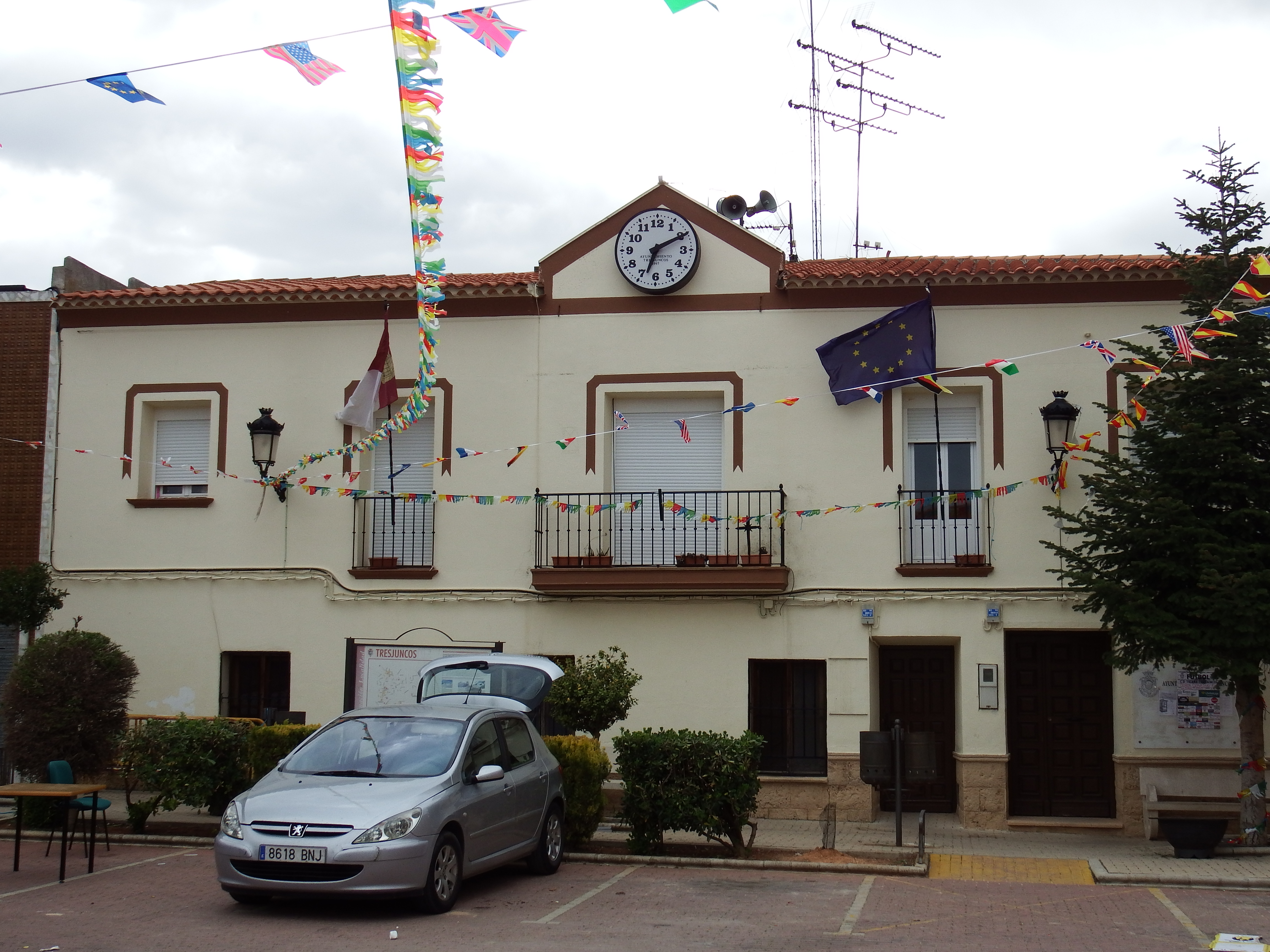
- Town hall

- Location within Spain Location within Castilla-La Mancha
- Coordinates: 39°43′N 2°45′W
- Country: Spain
- Autonomous community: Castile-La Mancha
- Province: Cuenca
- Municipality: Tresjuncos

Area
  - Total: 69 km^{2} (27 sq mi)

Population (2025-01-01)
  - Total: 258
  - Density: 3.7/km^{2} (9.7/sq mi)
- Time zone: UTC+1 (CET)
  - Summer (DST): UTC+2 (CEST)

Tresjuncos is a municipality located in the province of Cuenca, Castile-La Mancha, Spain. According to the 2004 census (INE), the municipality has a population of 445 inhabitants.
