= Belmonte, Cuenca =

Municipality in the province of Cuenca, Spain

- Municipality
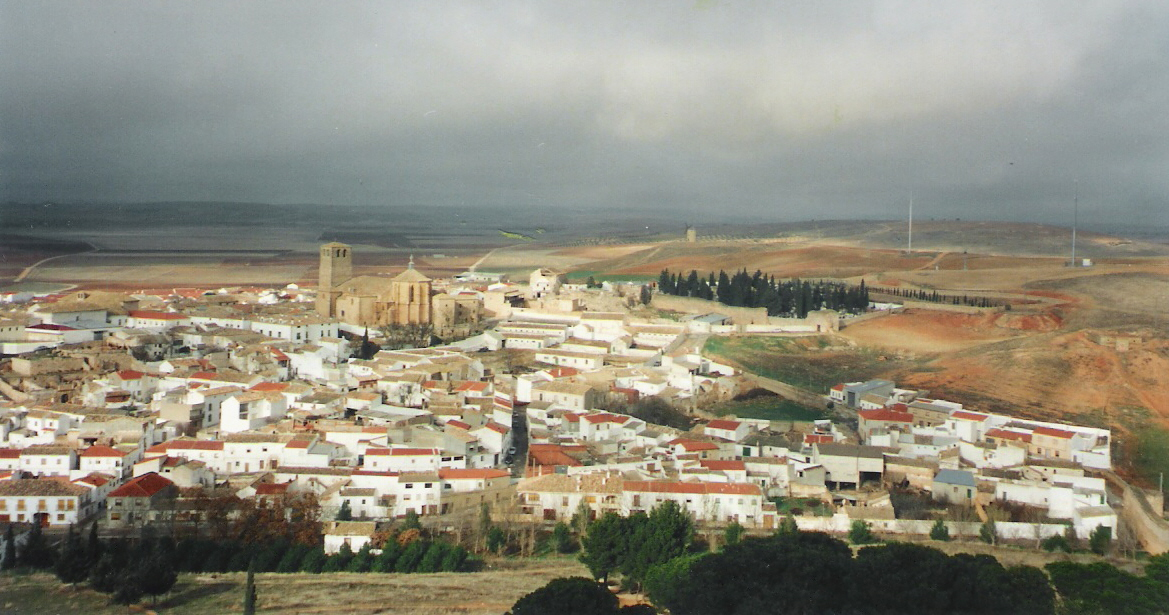

- Coat of arms

- Location within Spain Location within Castilla-La Mancha
- Coordinates: 39°33′33.78″N 2°42′30.19″W
- Country: Spain
- Autonomous community: Castile-La Mancha
- Province: Cuenca

Population (2025-01-01)
  - Total: 1,751
- Time zone: UTC+1 (CET)
  - Summer (DST): UTC+2 (CEST)

Belmonte is a municipality located in the province of Cuenca, Castile-La Mancha, Spain. In 2009, it had a population of 2,251.

== Notable people ==
- Juan Pacheco, born in Belmonte in 1419, he was the first Marquess of Villena.
- Pedro Girón, born in Belmonte in 1423, he was Grand Master of the Order of Calatrava.
- Fray Luis de León, born in Belmonte between 1527 and 1528.
