= Butaca Awards =

Butaca Awards Premis Butaca
- Awarded for: Valuable contributions to Catalan theater.
- Location: Several cities
- Country: Catalonia
- First award: 1995
- Final award: 2011
- Website: http://www.premisbutaca.cat

The Butaca Theater Awards of Catalonia (full Catalan name: Premis Butaca de teatre de Catalunya, short form: Butaca Awards, i.e. Premis Butaca) are annual theater awards judged by popular vote existing since 1995 in Catalonia to reward those who have made valuable contributions to Catalan theater.

== Spirit, Aims and Inner Workings ==
They were designed as the first awards granted by popular vote and as such, are exclusively the product of audience votes. The idea was to create awards that were direct and honest, unfettered by manipulation by interested parties. They also aimed to legitimate the audience's opinion. Any productions (in any language) debuting in Catalonia are eligible. These awards are considered very prestigious in Catalonia.

There are currently (in 2016) 19 categories for the award.

The nominations are done by a committee of people who have neither direct nor indirect connections to the world of theater and have to have attended at least 36 productions during the season.

== History ==
The Butaca Awards were created by initiative of the Radio program called "Des de la butaca" (From the butaca, where butaca refers to a seat in a theater), on Ràdio Premià de Mar, a radio station from the coastal town of Premià de Mar. Every three years, the awards ceremony takes place in Premià de Mar, but is otherwise itinerant.

Until 2010, they were called Premis Butaca de teatre i cinema de Catalunya (Butaca Theater and Film Awards of Catalonia) and, though they were mainly for theater, included awards for cinema as well (three categories, plus an honor award). They have since exclusively focused on theater. Also in 2010, two new categories emerged: Best Theater Production made in Spain and Best Foreign Production (performed in Catalonia during the season) but were merged into one (Best Spanish or Foreign Production) in the 2012 edition.

== Past Ceremonies ==
The following is a listing of a few editions of the Butaca Awards, though only indicating the winner of the Best Theater Production.

Edition	Awards Ceremony Date	Best Theater Production laureate	Host(s)	Venue
1st Butaca Awards	1995	Sweeney Todd		
2nd Butaca Awards	1996	Pel davant i pel darrere		
3rd Butaca Awards	1997	Àngels a Amèrica		
4th Butaca Awards	1998	Paraules encadenades		
5th Butaca Awards	1999	La reina de bellesa de Leenane		
6th Butaca Awards	2000	La vida es sueño		
7th Butaca Awards	2001	Titus Andrònic		Premià de Mar
8th Butaca Awards	2002	Escenes d'una execució		Premià de Mar
9th Butaca Awards	2003	Dissabte, diumenge i dilluns		Pavelló d'Esports Premià de Mar
10th Butaca Awards	2004	El mestre i Margarita		Pavelló d'Esports Premià de Mar
11th Butaca Awards	2005	Forasters		Pavelló d'Esports Premià de Mar
12th Butaca Awards	2006	Antígona		Viladecans
13th Butaca Awards	2007	Plataforma		Pavelló d'Esports Teresa Maria Roca, Mataró
14th Butaca Awards	November 24, 2008	Germanes		Premià de Mar
15th Butaca Awards	November 2, 2009	La casa de Bernarda Alba		Museu Marítim (Barcelona)
16th Butaca Awards	November 30, 2010	El Ball	Glòria Cid, Toni Martin	Artèria Paral·lel (Barcelona)
17th Butaca Awards	November 22, 2011	Agost		Teatre Lliure (Barcelona)
18th Butaca Awards	2012	Incendis		Mercat de les Flors (Barcelona)
19th Butaca Awards	2013	Els feréstecs		Sala Tallers, Teatre Nacional de Catalunya (Barcelona)
20th Butaca Awards	2014	L’Orfe del clan dels Zhao		Teatre Principal (Barcelona)
21st Butaca Awards	2015	El Rei Lear		Espai Lliure, Teatre Lliure (Barcelona)
22nd Butaca Awards	2016	Dansa d’agost		Teatre Apol·lo (Barcelona)
23rd Butaca Awards	2017			Mercat de les Flors (Barcelona)
