= Pilar Miró =

Spanish screenwriter and film director

Miró in 1989
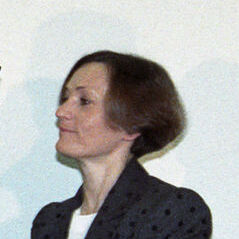
- Born: Pilar Mercedes Miró Romero; 20 April 1940; Madrid, Spain
- Died: 19 October 1997 (aged 57); Madrid, Spain
- Occupations: Film director Screenwriter
- Years active: 1976–1997

Pilar Mercedes Miró Romero (20 April 1940 – 19 October 1997) was a Spanish screenwriter and film director. She was the General Director of RTVE from 1986 to 1989. In the 1990s, she directed the television broadcasts of the weddings of the daughters of King Juan Carlos I.

She is credited with fostering Spain's film industry by introducing state aid for promising young filmmakers when she served as TV Director in Spain's Culture Ministry in the Socialist Government of the 1980s.

Her film Gary Cooper, Who Art in Heaven was entered into the 12th Moscow International Film Festival in 1981. Her 1986 film Werther was entered into the main competition at the 43rd edition of the Venice Film Festival. In 1992, her film Beltenebros won the Silver Bear for an outstanding artistic contribution at the 42nd Berlin International Film Festival. Her film El pájaro de la felicidad was screened in the Un Certain Regard section at the 1993 Cannes Film Festival.

In 1995, she was a member of the jury at the 45th Berlin International Film Festival.

On 18 March 1995, she directed the television broadcast of Infanta Elena's wedding in the Seville Cathedral. On 4 October 1997, she did the same for Infanta Cristina's wedding in the Barcelona Cathedral.

She died on 19 October 1997 in Madrid from a myocardial infarction.

== Filmography as film director ==
- La petición (1976)
- El crimen de Cuenca (1979)
- Gary Cooper que estás en los cielos (1980)
- Hablamos esta noche (1982)
- Werther (1986)
- Beltenebros (1991)
- El pájaro de la felicidad (1993)
- El perro del hortelano (1996)
- Tu nombre envenena mis sueños (1996)
