= List of Spanish films of 1998 =

A list of Spanish-produced and co-produced feature films released in Spain in 1998. The domestic theatrical release date is favoured.

== Films ==
Release		Title (Domestic title)	Cast & Crew	Ref.
J A N U A R Y	16	Things I Left in Havana (Cosas que dejé en La Habana)	Director: Manuel Gutiérrez Aragón Cast: Jorge Perugorría, Violeta Rodríguez, Kiti Mánver, Broselianda Hernández, Isabel Santos, Daisy Granados, Luis Alberto García, Pepón Nieto	
J A N U A R Y	23	Tangos Are for Two (Sus ojos se cerraron y el mundo sigue andando)	Director: Jaime Chávarri Cast: Darío Grandinetti, Aitana Sánchez-Gijón, Juan Echanove	
F E B R U A R Y	6	Caresses (Carícies)	Director: Ventura Pons Cast: Rosa Maria Sardà, Sergi López, Julieta Serrano	
F E B R U A R Y	13	Sleepless in Madrid (Insomnio)	Director: Chus Gutiérrez Cast: Cristina Marcos, Candela Peña, Ernesto Alterio, María Pujalte, Ginés García Millán	
F E B R U A R Y	20	The Naked Eye (La mirada del otro)	Director: Vicente Aranda Cast: Laura Morante, José Coronado, Miguel Ángel García, Juanjo Puigcorbé, Sancho Gracia, Ana Obregón, Miguel Bosé	
M A R C H	13	Torrente, the Dumb Arm of the Law (Torrente, el brazo tonto de la ley)	Director: Santiago Segura Cast: Santiago Segura, Javier Cámara, Neus Asensi, Chus Lampreave, Manuel Manquiña, Espartaco Santoni, Julio Sanjuán, Carlos Bardem, Darío Paso, Carlos Perea	
A P R I L	24	Shoot Out (El grito en el cielo)	Director: Félix Sabroso, Dunia Ayaso Cast: María Conchita Alonso, Loles León, María Pujalte, Ana Torrent, Daniel Guzmán, Pepón Nieto, María Adánez, Carmen Balagué	
A P R I L	30	Mensaka (Mensaka, páginas de una historia)	Director: Salvador García Ruiz Cast: Gustavo Salmerón, Tristán Ulloa, Adrià Collado, Laia Marull, María Esteve, Lola Dueñas, Guillermo Toledo	
M A Y	8	Hitting Bottom (En la puta calle)	Director: Enrique Gabriel Cast: Ramón Barea, Luis Alberto García	
J U N E	5	Once and for All (A tiro limpio)	Director: Jesús Mora Cast: Toni Cantó, Adolfo Fernández, Roman Luknár, Laura Pamplona, Diana Peñalver, Francesc Orella	
J U N E	12	A Perfect Couple (Una pareja perfecta)	Director: Francesc Betriu Cast: Antonio Resines, José Sazatornil "Saza", Kiti Mánver, Chus Lampreave, Ramón Barea, Antonio Canal, Luis Ciges, Pedro Mari Sánchez	
J U N E	19	The First Night of My Life (El primer día de mi vida)	Director: Miguel Albaladejo Cast: Carlos Fuentes, Leonor Watling, Mariola Fuentes, Juanjo Martínez, Emilio Gutiérrez Caba	
J U L Y	10	Cha-cha-chá	Director: Antonio del Real Cast: Eduardo Noriega, Ana Álvarez, María Adánez, Jorge Sanz, Gabino Diego, Marta Belaustegui	
A U G U S T	28	Lovers of the Arctic Circle (Los amantes del círculo polar)	Director: Julio Médem Cast: Najwa Nimri, Fele Martínez, Nancho Novo	
S E P T E M B E R	4	Un buen novio	Director: Jesús Delgado Cast: Fernando Guillén Cuervo, Natalia Verbeke, Adolfo Fernández	
S E P T E M B E R	11	The Stolen Years (Los años bárbaros)	Director: Fernando Colomo Cast: Jordi Mollà, Ernesto Alterio, Juan Echanove	
S E P T E M B E R	25	Tango	Director: Carlos Saura Cast : Miguel Ángel Solá, Mía Maestro	
S E P T E M B E R	25	Atilano for President (Atilano, presidente)	Director: La Cuadrilla Cast: Manuel Manquiña, Ramón Barea, Laura Conejero, Fernando Vivanco, Carlos Lucas, Luis Tosar, Luis Prendes, Saturnino García	
O C T O B E R	2	Barrio	Director: Fernando León de Aranoa Cast: Críspulo Cabezas, Tomás Benito, Eloi Yebra, Marieta Orozco, Alicia Sánchez, Enrique Villén, Francisco Algora, Chete Lera, Claude Pascadel	
O C T O B E R	9	Southern Border (Frontera sur)	Director: Gerardo Herrero Cast: José Coronado, Maribel Verdú, Federico Luppi	
O C T O B E R	23	Nothing in the Fridge (Nada en la nevera)	Director: Álvaro Fernández Armero Cast: María Esteve, Coque Malla	
O C T O B E R	30	The Grandfather (El abuelo)	Director: José Luis Garci Cast: Fernando Fernán Gómez, Cayetana Guillén Cuervo, Antonio Valero, Rafael Alonso	
O C T O B E R	30	Mararía	Director: Antonio José Betancor Cast: Goya Toledo, Carmelo Gómez, Iain Glen, Mirtha Ibarra, José Manuel Cervino	
N O V E M B E R	13	The Girl of Your Dreams (La niña de tus ojos)	Director: Fernando Trueba Cast: Penélope Cruz, Antonio Resines, Jorge Sanz, Loles León, Santiago Segura, Rosa Maria Sardà, Neus Asensi, Jesús Bonilla, Miroslav Taborsky, Johannes Silberschneider, Hanna Schygulla, Karel Dobry, Götz Otto, Juan Luis Galiardo, María Barranco	
D E C E M B E R	18	The Miracle of P. Tinto (El milagro de P. Tinto)	Director: Javier Fesser Cast: Luis Ciges	
D E C E M B E R	18	A Time for Defiance (La hora de los valientes)	Director: Antonio Mercero Cast: Gabino Diego, Leonor Watling, Luis Cuenca, Adriana Ozores, Juan José Otegui, Txema Blasco, Ramón Aguirre Josep Maria Pou, Aten Soria	

== Box office ==
The ten highest-grossing Spanish films in 1998, by domestic box office gross revenue, are as follows:

Highest-grossing films of 1998
Rank	Title	Distributor	Admissions	Domestic gross (€)
1	Torrente, the Dumb Arm of the Law (Torrente, El brazo tonto de la ley)	Columbia TriStar	2,840,925	10,254,169
2	Open Your Eyes (Abre los ojos) ‡	Sogepaq	1,297,686	4,576,930
3	The Girl of Your Dreams (La niña de tus ojos)	Lolafilms	1,234,242	4,772,270
4	Cha-cha-chá	Warner Sogefilms	778,048	2,769,332
5	Lovers of the Arctic Circle (Los amantes del círculo polar)	Alta Films	640,553	2,393,175
6	Barrio	Warner Sogefilms	533,690	2,007,276
7	The Stolen Years (Los años bárbaros)	Warner Sogefilms	468,573	1,734,353
8	The Grandfather (El abuelo)	Columbia TriStar	459,713	1,775,715
9	Secrets of the Heart (Secretos del corazón) ‡	Alta Films	367,782	1,288,875
10	Things I Left in Havana (Cosas que dejé en La Habana)	Alta Films	359,548	1,337,581
‡: 1997 theatrical opening

== See also ==
- 13th Goya Awards
