= Mararía (film) =

- Theatrical release poster
- Directed by: Antonio José Betancor
- Based on: Mararía by Rafael Arozarena
- Starring: Carmelo Gómez; Iain Glen; Goya Toledo; Mirtha Ibarra; José Manuel Cervino
- Cinematography: Juan Antonio Ruiz Achía
- Edited by: Guillermo Represa
- Music by: Pedro Guerra
- Production companies: Mararía PC; Aiete Films; Ariane Films; DMVB Films; Fábrica de Imágenes
- Distributed by: Alta Films (es)
- Release date: 30 October 1998 (Spain)
- Countries: Spain; France; Portugal
- Language: Spanish

Mararía is a 1998 drama film directed by Antonio José Betancor consisting of an adaptation of the 1973 novel Mararía by Rafael Arozarena which stars Goya Toledo as the title character alongside Carmelo Gómez, Iain Glen, Mirtha Ibarra and José Manuel Cervino. It was produced by companies from Spain, France, and Portugal.

== Plot ==
Set in 1930s Lanzarote (the easternmost of the Canary Islands), the plot tracks an English vulcanologist and a Basque physician vying for the love of Mararía, a local Canarian woman.

== Cast ==
- Goya Toledo as Mararía
- Carmelo Gómez as Fermín Izaguirre
- Iain Glen as Bertrand
- José Manuel Cervino as Marcial
- Mirtha Ibarra as Herminia
- Manuel Manquiña
- Francisco Casares
- Juli Mira
- Cyra Toledo
- Gloria del Toro
- Miguel Ángel Alonso
- Antonio Dechén
- Chamaida Santana

== Production ==
The screenplay is an adaptation of the 1973 novel Mararía by Rafael Arozarena, featuring substantial changes from the original work, such as the reduction in the number of males courting the character Mararía to 2, the characters portrayed by Gómez and Glen, the latter of which is an amalgamation of two characters from the novel. The film is an Aiete Films, Ariane Films and Mararia PC production, with participation of TVE, and in association with Portugal's Fábrica de Imágenes de Lisboa and France's C. V. de la Société de Production and D. M. V. B. Films, with support from Sociedad Canaria de las Artes Escénicas y de la Música, the Canarian Government's Viceconsejería de Cultura y Deportes and the island cabildos of Lanzarote and Gran Canaria.

== Release ==
Distributed by Alta Films, the film was theatrically released in Spain on 30 October 1998.

== Reception ==
Jonathan Holland of Variety considered the "terrifically lensed" film to be "a good old-fashioned melodrama" that manages to have enough "intelligent idiosyncrasy" to give it its own "power and charm".

== Accolades ==
Year	Award	Category	Nominee(s)	Result	Ref.
1999	13th Goya Awards	Best Adapted Screenplay	Antonio Betancor, Carlos Álvarez	Nominated	
1999	13th Goya Awards	Best New Actress	Goya Toledo	Nominated	
1999	13th Goya Awards	Best Cinematography	Juan Antonio Ruiz Anchía	Won	
1999	13th Goya Awards	Best Original Score	Pedro Guerra	Nominated	
1999	13th Goya Awards	Best Art Direction	Félix Murcia	Nominated	

== See also ==
- List of Spanish films of 1998
