= Segunda enseñanza =

TV series

- Genre: Drama
- Written by: Ana Diosdado
- Directed by: Pedro Masó
- Starring: Ana Diosdado
- Country of origin: Spain
- Original language: Spanish
- No. of seasons: 1
- No. of episodes: 13

Original release
- Network: TVE1
- Release: 23 January – 17 April 1986

Segunda enseñanza is a Spanish television series directed and produced by Pedro Masó and written by and starring Ana Diosdado that aired in 1986 on TVE1.

== Plot ==
The series follows Pilar, a history teacher and single mother who moves to Oviedo, together with her daughter, Elvira, to work in an "innovative" high school located in the city.

== Cast ==
- Ana Diosdado as Pilar Beltrán.
- Juan Diego as Jandro.
- Héctor Alterio as José Ramón.
- Cristina Marsillach as Elvira.
- Encarna Paso as Lucía.
- Patxi Bisquert as Rodri.
- Jorge Sanz
- Javier Bardem as Pablo.
- Gabino Diego
- Maribel Verdú as Laura.
- Aitana Sánchez-Gijón as Sisi.
- Cayetana Guillén Cuervo
- Silvia Marsó
- Joan Llaneras as Arturo.
- Ana Tsang as Makiko.
- Amparo Larrañaga as Adela.
- Francisco Piquer
- Gema Cuervo

== Production and release ==
The series, written by Ana Diosdado, was directed and produced by Pedro Masó. Shooting primarily took place in Asturias, including Oviedo, Gijón and Luarca.

The series consisted of 13 episodes. The broadcasting run on TVE1 lasted from 23 January 1986 to 17 April 1986.
