= Desde que amanece apetece =

- Directed by: Antonio del Real
- Written by: Joaquín Andújar
- Produced by: Enrique Cerezo; Tony Soto; Daniel Poza Arahuetes
- Cinematography: Juan Amorós
- Edited by: Miguel Ángel Santamaría
- Production companies: Enrique Cerezo Producciones Cinematográficas S.A. Televisión Española (TVE); Canal+ España; Instituto de la Cinematografía y de las Artes Audiovisuales
- Distributed by: DeAPlaneta; Sociedad Anónima del Vídeo
- Release date: March 2005
- Running time: 115 minutes
- Country: Spain
- Language: Spanish
- Box office: $339,079

Desde que amanece apetece (English: Since dawn he craves for it) is a 2005 Spanish comedy film directed by Antonio del Real and starring Gabino Diego, Arturo Fernández, Loles León, Mabel Escaño and Miguel Ángel Muñoz. The film was awarded the Godoy Award for Worst Spanish film of 2005.
