= 13th Goya Awards =

- Date: 23 January 1999
- Site: Palacio Municipal de Congresos de Madrid
- Hosted by: Rosa Maria Sardà
- Organized by: Academy of Cinematographic Arts and Sciences of Spain

Highlights
- Best Film: The Girl of Your Dreams
- Best Actor: Fernando Fernán Gómez; The Grandfather
- Best Actress: Penélope Cruz; The Girl of Your Dreams
- Most awards: The Girl of Your Dreams (7)
- Most nominations: The Girl of Your Dreams (18)

Television coverage
- Network: La 1
- Viewership: 3.69 million (33.5%)

The 13th Goya Awards ceremony, presented by the Academy of Cinematographic Arts and Sciences of Spain, took place at the Palacio Municipal de Congresos de Madrid on 23 January 1999.

The Girl of Your Dreams won the award for Best Film.

Hosted by Rosa Maria Sardà, the gala was broadcast on La 1, and had 3,688,000 viewers (33.5% share).

== Winners and nominees ==
The winners and nominees are listed as follows:

Best Film: The Girl of Your Dreams; Barrio; The Grandfather; Open Your Eyes	Best Director: Fernando León de Aranoa – Barrio; Alejandro Amenábar – Open Your Eyes; José Luis Garci – The Grandfather; Fernando Trueba – The Girl of Your Dreams
Best Actor: Fernando Fernán Gómez – The Grandfather; Gabino Diego – A Time for Defiance; Eduardo Noriega – Open Your Eyes; Antonio Resines – The Girl of Your Dreams	Best Actress: Penélope Cruz – The Girl of Your Dreams; Cayetana Guillén Cuervo – The Grandfather; Najwa Nimri – Lovers of the Arctic Circle; Leonor Watling – A Time for Defiance
Best Supporting Actor: Tony Leblanc – Torrente, the Dumb Arm of the Law; Francisco Algora – Barrio; Agustín González – The Grandfather; Jorge Sanz – The Girl of Your Dreams	Best Supporting Actress: Adriana Ozores – A Time for Defiance; Loles León – The Girl of Your Dreams; Alicia Sánchez – Barrio; Rosa Maria Sardà – The Girl of Your Dreams
Best Original Screenplay: Fernando León de Aranoa – Barrio; Alejandro Amenábar, Mateo Gil – Open Your Eyes; Julio Medem – Lovers of the Arctic Circle; Rafael Azcona, David Trueba, Miguel Ángel Egea, Carlos López – The Girl of Your Dreams	Best Adapted Screenplay: Luis Marías – Mensaka; Fernando Colomo, José Ángel Esteban, Carlos López, Nicolás Sánchez Albornoz – The Stolen Years; José Luis Garci, Horacio Valcárcel – The Grandfather; Carlos Álvarez, Antonio José Betancor – Mararía
Best New Actor: Miroslav Táborský – The Girl of Your Dreams; Ernesto Alterio – The Stolen Years; Javier Cámara – Torrente, the Dumb Arm of the Law; Tristán Ulloa – Mensaka	Best New Actress: Marieta Orozco – Barrio; María Esteve – Nothing in the Fridge; Violeta Rodríguez – Things I Left in Havana; Goya Toledo – Mararía
Best New Director: Santiago Segura – Torrente, the Dumb Arm of the Law; Salvador García Ruiz – Mensaka; Javier Fesser – The Miracle of P. Tinto; Miguel Albaladejo – The First Night of My Life	Best Original Score: Alberto Iglesias – Lovers of the Arctic Circle; Antoine Duhamel – The Girl of Your Dreams; Juan Bardem – The Stolen Years; Pedro Guerra – Mararía
Best Cinematography: Juan Ruiz Anchía – Mararía; Javier Aguirresarobe – The Girl of Your Dreams; Raúl Pérez Cubero – The Grandfather; Vittorio Storaro – Tango	Best Editing: Iván Aledo – Lovers of the Arctic Circle; Carmen Frías – The Girl of Your Dreams; Miguel González Sinde – The Grandfather; María Elena Sáinz de Rozas – Open Your Eyes
Best Art Direction: Gerardo Vera – The Girl of Your Dreams; Gil Parrondo – The Grandfather; Félix Murcia – Mararía; Wolfgang Burmann – Open Your Eyes	Best Production Supervision: Angélica Huete – The Girl of Your Dreams; Luis María Delgado, Valentín Panero – The Grandfather; Emiliano Otegui – Open Your Eyes; Mikel Nieto – A Time for Defiance
Best Sound: Jorge Stavropulos, Carlos Faruolo, Alfonso Pino – Tango; José Antonio Bermúdez, Diego Garrido, Antonio García – The Grandfather; Pierre Gamet, Dominique Hennequin, Santiago Thévenet – The Girl of Your Dreams; Daniel Goldstein, Ricardo Steinberg, Patrick Ghislain – Open Your Eyes	Best Special Effects: Raúl Romanillos, Félix Bergés – The Miracle of P. Tinto; Emilio Ruiz, Alfonso Nieto – The Girl of Your Dreams; Reyes Abades, Alberto Esteban, Aurelio Sánchez – Open Your Eyes; Juan Ramón Molina – A Time for Defiance
Best Costume Design: Sonia Grande, Lala Huete – The Girl of Your Dreams; Gumersindo Andrés – The Grandfather; Javier Artiñano – A Time for Defiance; Mercè Paloma – Those Who Love	Best Makeup and Hairstyles: Antonio Panizza, Gregorio Ros – The Girl of Your Dreams; Mercedes Guillot, José Quetglás – The Stolen Years; Cristóbal Criado, Alicia López – The Grandfather; Paca Almenara, Colin Arthur, Sylvie Imbert – Open Your Eyes
Best Spanish Language Foreign Film: The Lighthouse • Argentina; Coup at Daybreak • Venezuela; Esmeralda Comes by Night • Mexico; Little Tropikana • Cuba	Best European Film: The Boxer • Ireland; April • Italy; Marius and Jeannette • France; The Thief • Russia
Best Fictional Short Film: On a Perfect Day; Génesis; Patesnak, Un Cuento de Navidad; Rufino; Viaje a la Luna	Best Documentary Short Film: Confluencias
Best Animated Film: ¡Qué vecinos tan animales!; Ahmed, el príncipe de la Alhambra

== Honorary Goya ==
Rafael Alonso was posthumously awarded the Honorary Goya Award.
