= Fernando Soto (Spanish actor) =

Spanish actor and director (born 1968)

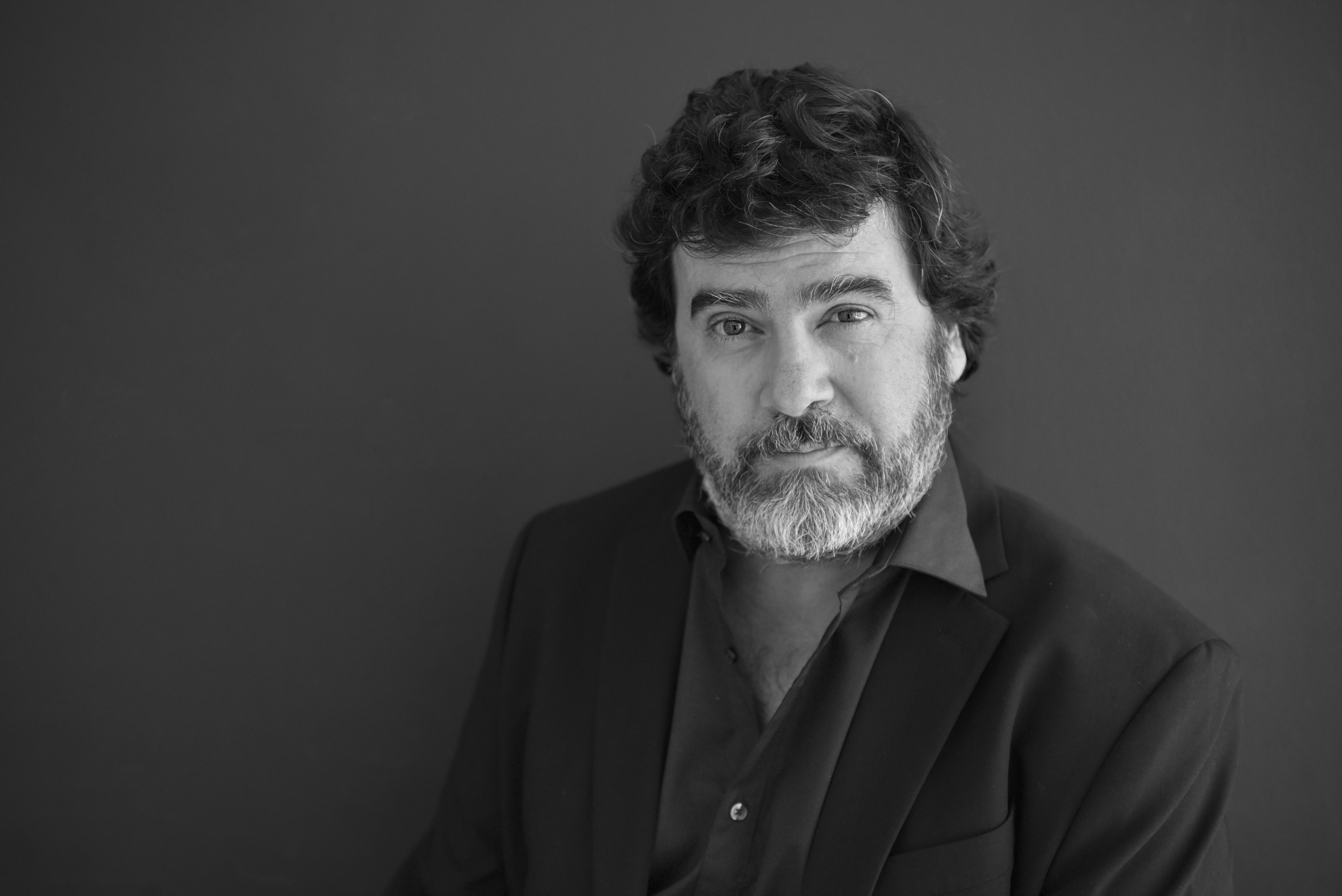
- Born: 18 October 1968 (age 57)
- Occupation: Actor
- Years active: 1993-present

Fernando Soto (born in Madrid, 18 October 1968) is a Spanish actor and director. He graduated from the RESAD School of Drama in 1992.

As an actor Soto has been in many theatre productions, starting in Teatro de la Abadía, where he participated in plays such as Maridos y Mujeres, Sobre Horacios y Curiaceos, Me acordaré de todos vosotros, La melancolía de King Kong, and Medida por Medida. His performances were also seen in Perfectos desconocidos, directed by Daniel Guzmán; La Avería, directed by Blanca Portillo; Alejandro y Ana, with Animalario Productions; and the Centro Dramático Nacional (CDN) productions of Madre Coraje (directed by Ernesto Caballero) and La ciudad oscura (written by Antonio Rojano). In the Teatro Español he performed in Don Juan, El loco de los balcones, and Jose Ramón Fernández's Yo soy Don Quijote de la Mancha as Sancho Panza, sharing the stage with José Sacristán.

Soto's work as an actor in film includes appearances in Daniel Monzón's Celda 211; Paco León's Kiki, el amor se hace; Ángeles González Sinde's Una palabra tuya and La suerte dormida; Imanol Uribe's Miel de naranjas; Alberto Rodríguez's After; Eduardo Chapero-Jackson's Verbo; Julien Leclerq's The Informant; and Álex de la Iglesia's Balada triste de trompeta.

On television Soto has been engaged in series like La casa de papel, Amar es para siempre, La Catedral del mar, Isabel, Alatriste, Homicidios, Vive camtando, la pecera de Eva, Frágiles, Sin tetas no hay paraíso, Doctor Mateo, Hospital Central, Aída, Vientos de agua, La que se avecina, El ret, Mi gitana, Amar es para siempre, Cuestión de sexo, La señora, Guante blanco, La princesa de Eboli, Mario Conde (los días de gloria), and Los Serrano.

As a director, Soto has been behind plays like La estupidez by Rafael Spregelburd; Drac Pack by Najwa Nimry, Carlos Dorrego and Emilio Tomé; Constelaciones by Nick Payne; El minuto del payaso, Babilonia, and Las Cervantas by Jose Ramón Fernández and Inma Chacón; Taxidermia de un gorrión by Oskar Galán; Onán by Nacho Faerma; Tarinspotting Harry Gibson; Bailar en la oscuridad, an adaptation of a Lars Von Tier film; Autopsia by Jose Manuel Mora; Rulos and Prohibido besar by Ángeles González Sinde; Hamster by Santiago Cortegoso; and La virtuz de la torpeza and Delirare by Cristina Redondo.

Soto has also taken part in shows for the National Heritage such as productions by EscenaTe, directing in places like El Museo del Prado, Jardín del Capricho and La Muralla de Ávila.

== Selected filmography ==
| Year | Title | Role | Notes |
|---|---|---|---|
| 2009 | Cell 211 | | |
| 2011 | Verbo | | |
| 2017 | La casa de papel | Subinspector Angel Rubio | |
| 2018 | Asesinato en la universidad | Antonio de Román | |
