= Jacobo Rispa =

Jacobo Rispa is a director and freelance producer working in TV drama and film.

== Career ==
After attending Emerson College in Boston, he directed the short film Un día perfecto for which he was awarded the Goya for Best Short Film in the 13th Goya Awards. Having gained respect and recognition from the industry, in 1999 he started directing the TV drama Hospital Central for Telecinco, which is currently the longest-running fiction in Spanish TV.
