= María Teresa de Vega =

Spanish writer and poet

- Born: San Cristóbal de La Laguna, Spain
- Education: University of La Laguna
- Occupation: Writer
- Father: Isaac de Vega
- Website: www.mariateresadevega.es

María Teresa de Vega is a Spanish writer and poet. She has been included within the Generation 21 group of writers.

== Biography ==
María Teresa de Vega was born in San Cristóbal de La Laguna, Tenerife. She is the daughter of writer Isaac de Vega who was part of the Fetasiano group.

She earned a licentiate in Romance Philology at the University of La Laguna. A few years at the School of Fine Arts of Santa Cruz de Tenerife contributed to her training.

She has been a Spanish Language and Literature teacher at teaching centers in Tenerife and Madrid.

She has published four poetry collections – Perdonen que hoy no esté jovial (2001), Cerca de lo lejano (2006), Mar cifrado (2009), and Necesidad de Orfeo (2015); two books of short stories – Perdidos en las redes (2000) and Sociedad sapiens (2005); and three novels – Niebla solar (2009), Merodeadores de orilla (2012), and Divisa de las hojas (2014).

The prose of María Teresa de la Vega has been characterized by the writer and literature professor Damián H. Estévez as "poetic, essentially lyrical and narrative in the essentials. Because it is so important for the composition of the characters, events that happen to them, the conversations that they hold, like the introspection to which the author invites us through her style." The writer and critic Daniel María said of Merodeadores de orilla: "The novel contains passages that include the essay and the philosophical dissertation, and passages that involve the poetic prose of a surrealizing impulse."

Her work Divisa de las hojas was selected for the Santa Cruz city reading project. She has participated in the cycle Entre palabras.

== Publications ==
=== Novels ===
- Niebla solar (2009), Editorial Baile del sol, ISBN 97884-92528714
- Merodeadores de orilla (2012), Ediciones Aguere-Idea, ISBN 9788499418049
- Divisa de las hojas (2014), Ediciones Aguere-Idea, ISBN 9788416143412
- El doble oscuro (2018), Ediciones Nace, ISBN 9788494793905

=== Short story collections ===
- Perdidos en las redes (2000), Editorial Benchomo
- Sociedad sapiens (2005), Editorial Baile del sol, ISBN 84-96225-52-6

=== Poetry collections ===
- Perdonen que hoy no esté jovial (2001), Editorial Benchomo, ISBN 8495657384
- Cerca de lo lejano (2006), Editorial Benchomo
- Mar cifrado (2009), Ediciones Idea, ISBN 9788483829769
- Necesidad de Orfeo (2015), Escritura entre las nubes, ISBN 9788416385331
