= A Perfect Couple (1998 film) =

- Theatrical release poster
- Spanish: Una pareja perfecta
- Directed by: Francesc Betriu
- Screenplay by: Rafael Azcona
- Based on: Diario de un jubilado by Miguel Delibes
- Produced by: Andrés Vicente Gómez
- Starring: Antonio Resines; José Sazatornil-Saza; Kiti Manver; Chus Lampreave; Ramón Barea; Antonio Canal; Luis Ciges; Pedro Mari Sánchez; Lucía Jiménez; Daniel Guzmán; José M. Pou; Mabel Lozano; Pablo Carbonell
- Cinematography: Carlos Suárez
- Edited by: Nicholas Wentworth
- Music by: Roque Baños
- Production companies: Lolafilms; Cartel; Vía Digital
- Distributed by: Columbia Tri-Star Films de España
- Release dates: 29 May 1998 (Málaga); 12 June 1998 (Spain)
- Country: Spain
- Language: Spanish

A Perfect Couple (Spanish: Una pareja perfecta) is a 1998 Spanish comedy film directed by Francesc Betriu from a screenplay by Rafael Azcona based on the novel Diario de un jubilado by Miguel Delibes which stars Antonio Resines and José Sazatornil "Saza". The film proved to be a critical failure and a commercial flop.

== Plot ==
The plot tracks the friendship between a pedantic homosexual poet and an unemployed typographer.

== Cast ==
- Antonio Resines as Lorenzo
- José Sazatornil "Saza" as Don Tadeo
- Kiti Manver as Anita
- Chus Lampreave as Doña Cuca
- Ramón Barea as Melecio
- Antonio Canal as Toni
- Luis Ciges as Partenio
- Pedro Mari Sánchez as Silvio
- Lucía Jiménez as Sonia
- Daniel Guzmán as Terry
- José María Pou as Presidente
- Mabel Lozano as Faustina
- Pablo Carbonell

== Production ==
Written by Rafael Azcona, the screenplay is an adaptation of the 1995 novel Diario de un jubilado by Miguel Delibes. The film is a Lolafilms, Cartel, and Vía Digital production.

== Release ==
The film opened the 1st Málaga Film Festival in May 1998. Distributed by Columbia Tri-Star Films de España, it was released theatrically in Spain on 12 June 1998.

== Reception ==
Casimiro Torreiro of El País wrote that "the film is not a marvel, but among its images there emerges at least a dignity of well-practiced craft that saves it from ridicule".

== Accolades ==
Year	Award	Category	Nominee(s)	Result	Ref.
1998	1st Málaga Film Festival	Best Actress	Kiti Mánver	Won	

== See also ==
- List of Spanish films of 1998
