= Lovers of the Arctic Circle =

- Theatrical release poster
- Spanish: Los amantes del círculo polar
- Directed by: Julio Médem
- Screenplay by: Julio Médem
- Produced by: Fernando Bovaira; Enrique López Lavigne
- Starring: Fele Martínez; Najwa Nimri; Nancho Novo; Maru Valdivielso
- Cinematography: Kalo F. Berridi
- Edited by: Iván Aledo
- Music by: Alberto Iglesias
- Production companies: Alicia Produce; Bailando en la Luna
- Release date: 4 September 1998
- Running time: 112 minutes
- Country: Spain
- Language: Spanish

Lovers of the Arctic Circle (Spanish: Los amantes del círculo polar), also known as The Lovers from the North Pole, is a 1998 Spanish romantic drama film written and directed by Julio Médem and starring Najwa Nimri and Fele Martínez. It won two Goya Awards in 1999.

The film tells the story of Otto and Ana from their chance meeting outside school at the age of 8, until they meet again in their 20s in Lapland within the Arctic Circle, under the midnight sun. The themes developed in the film form an important part of Julio Medem's universe, and can be found in his other movies; these include love, death, destiny, nature, the circle of life and the coincidences in life. It received favorable critical reviews.

== Plot ==
The movie (told from the point of view of the two main characters), opens with Otto hanging from a tree by a parachute after surviving a fateful plane crash. In voiceover he reflects on how he met Ana, his stepsister and secret lover.

17 years earlier, when Ana and Otto are 8, Otto first sees Ana while rushing to retrieve a soccer ball in the forest outside their school, and is smitten immediately. Ana's voiceover reveals that she is also very struck by him, but nothing is spoken. She had run into the forest in grief over her father's death and at first she thinks Otto might be her father's reincarnation, but dismisses the idea after studying her father's photo in an album and finding absolutely no resemblance between him and Otto.

The next morning Otto writes a question about love on dozens of paper airplanes and sends them flying over the schoolyard. They're read by everyone, including Ana's mother Olga and Otto's father Álvaro, who meet for the first time while commenting on this question. After exchanging a few words, Álvaro offers Olga and her daughter a ride.

Otto hears his father yelling his name, and runs to the car. When he opens the car door, he's shocked to see Ana in the back seat. She greets him warmly and openly; through her point of view we learn that she knows his name from his father's yelling and that she's surprised and delighted to see him again. They ride in the back seat. While their parents talk, Otto's voiceover reveals that he's hopelessly in love with Ana and wonders how she feels about him.

Neither child has siblings; Olga is a widow, and Otto's parents are divorced. His mother Yolanda isn't taking that too well. Otto feels for her, but he is delighted when his father marries Ana's mother: he will be close to his one true love.

The story moves forward several years. The two children are now in their middle teens, their unprofessed love fanatically hidden from their parents.

Otto's mother has never gotten over her divorce and Otto is a comfort to her. He's concerned about her welfare and feels responsible for keeping her happy, but his longing for Ana overpowers him.

Desire finally eclipses responsibility, and Otto moves in with his father, desperate for Ana's love. One night they're doing homework together and they discuss Finland, the Arctic Circle, and the Midnight Sun. They fall silent and Ana rests her head on Otto's chest and listens to his heartbeat. They make out.

Soon after, during a family barbecue, Ana passes Otto a note inviting him to her bedroom. That night he goes to her. At last they confront their feelings and become lovers.

Several more years pass and we see that they've succeeded in keeping their affair a secret, in spite of the fact that they're conducting it right under their parents' noses. However, Yolanda has sunk deeper into depression since Otto's departure. Finally, feeling abandoned by both husband and son, she commits suicide. Otto, guilt-ridden and bereaved, leaves his father's house one morning without saying a word, and essentially disappears. In utter despair, Ana locks herself in her room and cries, refusing to answer when her mother asks her what's wrong. She leaves home. Becomes a schoolteacher.

Time passes. Otto falls into a series of fatuous affairs. During one of them, the subject of his mother comes up. He tells the girl "She died of love" and when the girl asks "How does one die of love?" he answers, "She died abandoned."

Ana and Otto almost meet again at Plaza Mayor in Madrid. They arrive separately and sit with their backs to each other, each unaware of the other's presence. Otto sits alone; Ana is approached by a man who wants to talk to her. All they would need to do is turn around to see the other sitting there, but this never happens and it's clear that something karmic has been shattered.

Ana begins a relationship with the man in the park. Meanwhile, her mother Olga is seduced away from Álvaro by another man, also named Álvaro, and ends their marriage. Otto returns home to find Ana and Olga gone and his father distraught over Olga leaving him.

Running through the story like a thread is the subplot of how Otto got his name:

There was a German fighter pilot during WWII named Otto and related to Yolanda, whose plane crashed in Finland. He fell in love with a woman.

The other Otto understands that because he has left Ana, he has been left without a destiny. He becomes a pilot like his namesake and flies to Finland, a twist of fate which Olga cheerfully communicates to Ana via a video. Soon after, Ana's affair with the man in the park turns toxic and she's forced to get away from him. Olga's lover knows someone who has a cabin in Finland: it's none other than the man for whom Otto was named, the German pilot whose plane crashed during WWII. Olga's lover makes clear that the cabin is just sitting there empty and that the German pilot would willingly let Ana use it until the crisis with her lover blows over.

Ana accepts, and writes a letter to her stepbrother: She wants them to meet in Finland. The time has come to reclaim their love. Flying to the cabin, Ana looks out and sees Otto's cargo plane, but doesn't even think that it might be his. Almost simultaneously, Otto looks out the window of his cargo plane and sees the 747 Ana is on, but is equally oblivious.

Ana arrives at the cabin, and sits outside in a straight back chair, waiting for Otto to arrive. When he doesn't, she panics.

Meanwhile, Otto is hanging from a tree, having survived a plane crash just like his namesake, and getting his parachute caught in the branches... Bringing us to the beginning of the film.

Hearing that a cargo plane has crashed, Ana frantically tries to find out if it was Otto's. Tearing through the local newspaper looking for clues, she gets hit by a truck while crossing the street. By this time Otto has been rescued and hitched a ride with his rescuers.

There's a final, two-part epilogue:

In the first part, Ana crosses the street instead of getting hit by bus. She runs up the stairs of an apartment building and is greeted by the German pilot who tells her that someone inside the apartment is waiting for her. She goes inside and sees Otto who's smiling warmly. They exchange soft words, and she embraces him, making it the perfect reunion. Until it's seen that Ana's eyes are wide open and dilated and that Otto's face is reflected in the lenses.

In the second part, Otto and his rescuers have stopped at an intersection. Otto, seeing Ana sprawled on the pavement, gets out of the car and runs to her. It then cuts to their reunion (which is only a dream), and it's revealed that Otto's face in Ana's eyes is the reflection of him leaning over her as she sees him one last time before dying.

We see a shot of Otto's destroyed cargo plane in the snow.

== Cast ==
- Najwa Nimri as Ana de joven
- Fele Martínez as Otto de joven
- Nancho Novo as padre de Otto
- Maru Valdivielso as madre de Ana
- Sara Valiente as Ana de niña
- Peru Médem Otto de niño
- Victor Hugo Oliveira as Otto de adolescente
- Kristel Díaz as Ana de adolescente
- Pep Munné as profesor de Otto

== Production ==
Lovers of the Arctic Circle was shot in Madrid and in various locations in Finland.

Julio Medem based part of the film on his own experience of unrequited teenage love for his next door neighbor. He also included a reference to his Basque mother and German father in a scene in which a Basque farmer rescues a stranded German paratrooper. Medem said this was "a way of bringing together the two sides of my family."

== Reception ==
On the review aggregator website Rotten Tomatoes, 82% of 28 critics' reviews are positive, with an average rating of 7.3/10.

Jonathan Holland of Variety declared the film "an offbeat and intelligent love story".

== Awards ==
Year	Award	Category	Nominee(s)	Result	Ref.
1999	13th Goya Awards	Best Original Screenplay	Julio Medem	Nominated	
1999	13th Goya Awards	Best Actress	Najwa Nimri	Nominated	
1999	13th Goya Awards	Best Original Score	Alberto Iglesias	Won	
1999	13th Goya Awards	Best Editing	Iván Aledo	Won	

Julio Medem also received the Audience Award at the 2000 Athens International Film Festival and the Audience Award for Best Latin Film at the Gramado Film Festival. The film also won an Ondas Award for Best Spanish Film and Najwa Nimri won for Best Actress.

== See also ==
- List of Spanish films of 1998
