= Asesinato en la Universidad =

2018 Spanish historical thriller film

- Written by: Clara Pérez Escrivá; Antonio Asencio
- Story by: Joaquín Llamas
- Directed by: Iñaki Peñafiel
- Starring: Leonor Watling; Patrick Criado; Daniel Grao; Joaquín Climent; Macarena Sanz; Fernando Soto
- Music by: Pablo Cervantes
- Country of origin: Spain
- Original language: Spanish

Production
- Producers: Albert Bori; Luis Hernández Cardona; Gerardo Iracheta; Maite L. Pisonero; Iñaki Peñafiel
- Cinematography: Teo Delgado
- Editor: David Tomás
- Production companies: RTVE; La Cometa TV

Original release
- Network: La 1
- Release: 1 November 2018

Asesinato en la universidad is a 2018 Spanish historical thriller film directed by Iñaki Peñafiel, written by Antonio Asencio and Clara Pérez Escrivá and starring Leonor Watling, Patrick Criado and Fernando Soto. It was released on La 1 and it is set in the Universidad de Salamanca in the 16th century.

== Cast ==
- Leonor Watling as Lara Cabanes
- Patrick Criado as Fray Luis de León
- Fernando Soto as Antonio de Román
- Chani Martín as Javier de Castro
- Macarena Sanz as Sonia
- Fernando Albizu as Nicolás de Medina
- Ramón Agirre as Santiago Montemayor
- Dani Luque as Gaspar
- Juanma Lara
- Antonio Bachiller as Rodrigo
- Iván Sánchez as Juan Soto Mesa
- Jon Mendía as Pedro Ferrer
- Javier Pereira as Padre Galindo
- Alfonso Bassave as Carlos
- Joaquín Climent as Tomás
- Daniel Grao as Fernando

== Production ==
The film was produced by RTVE alongside La Cometa TV, with support from Ayuntamiento de Salamanca and USAL. Shooting locations included Salamanca and Madrid.

== Release ==
The film landed a pre-screening at the San Sebastián International Film Festival on 27 September 2018. RTVE set a premiere on La 1 for 1 November 2018.

== See also ==
- List of Spanish films of 2018
