= Southern Border (film) =

1998 film

- Theatrical release poster
- Spanish: Frontera Sur
- Directed by: Gerardo Herrero
- Starring: José Coronado; Maribel Verdú; Federico Luppi
- Cinematography: Alfredo Mayo
- Edited by: Carmen Frías
- Music by: Luis Bacalov
- Release dates: 9 October 1998 (Spain); 24 June 1999 (Argentina)
- Countries: Argentina; Spain; France; Germany
- Language: Spanish

Southern Border (Spanish: Frontera Sur) is a 1998 historical drama film directed by Gerardo Herrero. The music was composed by Luis Bacalov. Set in Argentina, the plot follows Roque, forced to emigrate after killing a man in Spain.

== Cast ==
- José Coronado as Roque
- Maribel Verdú as Teresa / Piera
- Federico Luppi as Maidana
- Roberto Baldi
- Hector Bordoni
- Luis Brandoni
- Augusto Brítez
- Franco Camilaro
- Paula Canals
- Celio Cangossu
- Néstor Carvutto
- Fausto Collado
- Francisco Corbalán
- Ira Frontén

== Release ==
The film was theatrically released in Spain on 9 October 1998.

== Reception ==
Jonathan Holland of Variety considered that despite boasting "an epic tale of love and friendship in turn-of-the-century Buenos Aires", "a sexy cast in period costumes" and "sumptuous music and neat special effects", the only thing neglected by Herrero is the script.

== See also ==
- List of Spanish films of 1998
