= On a Perfect Day =

- Spanish: Un día perfecto
- Directed by: Jacobo Rispa
- Release date: 1998

On a Perfect Day (Spanish: Un día perfecto) is a science fiction short film by Jacobo Rispa. It was awarded with the Goya in 1999, and received various other prizes in Alcine, Viña del Mar, and Festival Internacional de Cortometrajes de Vila Real.
