= Mensaka =

- Theatrical release poster
- Spanish: Mensaka, páginas de una historia
- Directed by: Salvador García Ruiz
- Screenplay by: Salvador García Ruiz
- Based on: Mensaka by José Ángel Mañas
- Produced by: Gerardo Herrero; Javier López Blanco
- Starring: Gustavo Salmerón; Tristán Ulloa; Adrià Collado; Laia Marull; María Esteve; Lola Dueñas; Guillermo Toledo
- Cinematography: Teo Delgado
- Edited by: Carmen Frías
- Music by: Pascal Gaigne
- Production company: Tornasol Films
- Distributed by: Alta Films
- Release date: 30 April 1998
- Country: Spain
- Language: Spanish

Mensaka (Spanish: Mensaka, páginas de una historia; transl. 'Mensaka, Pages from a Story') is a 1998 Spanish drama film written and directed by Salvador García Ruiz (in his directorial feature debut) consisting of an adaptation of the novel Mensaka by José Ángel Mañas. It stars Gustavo Salmerón, Tristán Ulloa, Adrià Collado, Laia Marull, María Esteve, Lola Dueñas and Guillermo Toledo.

== Plot ==
The plot focus on a group of young people belonging to different social classes. It tracks the relationships between David and Fran (who both play in an underground rock band in Madrid alongside Javi) with their girlfriends Bea and Natalia as well as the mishaps of Javi and romantic interest Cristina. Meanwhile, Laura, Javi's little sister, has formed a gang and deals drugs.

== Cast ==
- Gustavo Salmerón as David
- Tristán Ulloa as Javi
- Adrià Collado as Fran
- Laia Marull as Bea
- María Esteve as Natalia
- Lola Dueñas as Cristina
- Guillermo Toledo as Ricardo
- Sandra Rodríguez as Laura
- Ginés García Millán as Ramón

== Production ==
The film was produced by Tornasol Films and it had the participation of TVE.

== Release ==
Distributed by Alta Films, Mensaka was theatrically released in Spain on 30 April 1998.

== Reception ==
Jonathan Holland of Variety deemed the film to be "a gritty, compassionate study of post-adolescent life in contemporary Spain", and "a good showcase for young local acting talent".

Ángel Fernández-Santos of El País gave a positive review and highlighted the craft of Salvador García in his debut film (managing to uplift a "storyline of little substance") and the performances of Salmerón, Ulloa, Marull and Dueñas.

The "unapologetic brand of female adolescent subjectivity" represented by the character of Laura (Javi's "demonic little sister"), displaying a take on the wild child archetype, has been drawn out as a highlight of "an unexpectedly striking movie" by Matthew J. Marr.

José Angel Mañas commented that, out of all the transpositions of his works, Mensaka was the one he liked the most.

== Accolades ==
Year	Award	Category	Nominee(s)	Result	Ref.
1999	13th Goya Awards	Best Adapted Screenplay	Salvador García Ruiz	Won	
1999	13th Goya Awards	Best New Director	Salvador García Ruiz	Nominated	
1999	13th Goya Awards	Best New Actor	Tristán Ulloa	Nominated	

== See also ==
- List of Spanish films of 1998

== Bibliography ==
- Maíllo Baz, Diego (2021). "De la novela al cine: la derrota del punk en «Mensaka» (José Ángel Mañas y Salvador García Ruiz)". Esferas Literarias. 4. Córdoba: UCO Press: 107–122. ISSN 2659-4218.
- Marr, Matthew J. (2013). "The "Angry Girl" in Mensaka, Páginas de una historia". The Politics of Age and Disability in Contemporary Spanish Film. Plus Ultra Pluralism. New York and London: Routledge. ISBN 978-0-415-80836-1.
