= Raquel busca su sitio =

- Genre: Drama
- Starring: Leonor Watling; Cayetana Guillén Cuervo; Nancho Novo; María Vázquez; Javier Albalá; Miguel Hermoso Arnao; Laura Cepeda
- Country of origin: Spain
- Original language: Spanish
- No. of seasons: 1
- No. of episodes: 25

Production
- Executive producer: Hervé Hachuel]
- Production company: Tesauro S.A. for Televisión Española

Original release
- Network: La 1
- Release: January 2000 – July 2000

Raquel busca su sitio (English: Raquel looks for her place) is a Spanish television series produced by Tesauro S.A. for Televisión Española. It consisted of 25 episodes, each of one hour. It was broadcast by La 1 between 2000 and 2001. TVE decided to extend the original planned run of 13 episodes to 25 due to favorable reviews from the press and from social workers, whose work serves as the theme of the show. It has been rebroadcast by Cosmopolitan TV, Canal Extremadura Televisión and Cubavisión.

== Plot ==
The show centers on a social services center. Raquel (Leonor Watling), a young Spanish divorcee and a theorist of social work, used to be employed as a social worker in Brussels. However, after requesting a transfer, she has returned to Spain. Thanks to connections, she is employed at the social services center, which is run by a thirtysomething woman, also named Raquel (Cayetana Guillén Cuervo), but who prefers to be called Quela.

The series helped create awareness for social workers' duties and challenges, and also created a public and popular perception of social workers in Spain.

== Awards ==
Due to the show's depiction of social workers, and the work that they do in Spain, the Association of Directors and Managers of Social Services (Asociación de Directores y Gerentes de Servicios Sociales) awarded its annual prize to the series in 2000.

== Episodes ==
- Chapter 1 – No es fácil ser Raquel.
- Chapter 2 – Quela en la encrucijada.
- Chapter 3 – David contra David.
- Chapter 4 – El mediador.
- Chapter 5 – El feliz cumpleaños de Raquel.
- Chapter 6 – Quela, Año Cero.
- Chapter 7 – Vida, Muerte, Eternidad.
- Chapter 8 – Sin perdón.
- Chapter 9 – Mirando hacia atrás sin ira.
- Chapter 10 – La espía que me amo.
- Chapter 11 – Todo el mundo necesita un poco de amor.
- Chapter 12 – El país de los sueños.
- Chapter 13 – Alguien que me cuide.
- Chapter 14 – Un corazón fatigado.
- Chapter 15 – Compromiso.
- Chapter 16 – La ladrona.
- Chapter 17 – Una sombra de duda.
- Chapter 18 – Los amigos de Quela
- Chapter 19 – Manuel.
- Chapter 20 – Rencor.
- Chapter 21 – Las raíces del mal.
- Chapter 22 – De quien soy yo.
- Chapter 23 – Inteligencia emocional.
- Chapter 24 – Tocando el cielo.
- Chapter 25 – Princesa herida.
