= Isaac de Vega =

Spanish writer (Canary Islands)

- Born: 7 November 1920
- Died: 3 February 2014 (aged 93)

Isaac de Vega (7 November 1920 – 3 February 2014) was a Spanish Canarian writer. He received the Premio Canarias de Literatura in 1988 along with Rafael Arozarena.

De Vega was born in Granadilla de Abona, Tenerife, Canary Islands and studied at the University of La Laguna. He formed a part of the fetasiano group with other Canarian writers including Rafael Arozarena and José Antonio Padrón.

His daughter María Teresa de Vega is a writer and poet.

== Literature ==
He wrote several works including:

- Antes del amanecer (1956)
- Fetasa (1957)
- Cuatro relatos (1968)
- Parhelios (1977)
- Pulsatia (1988)
- Conjuro en Ijuana (1981)
