= Leonor Watling =

Spanish actress and singer

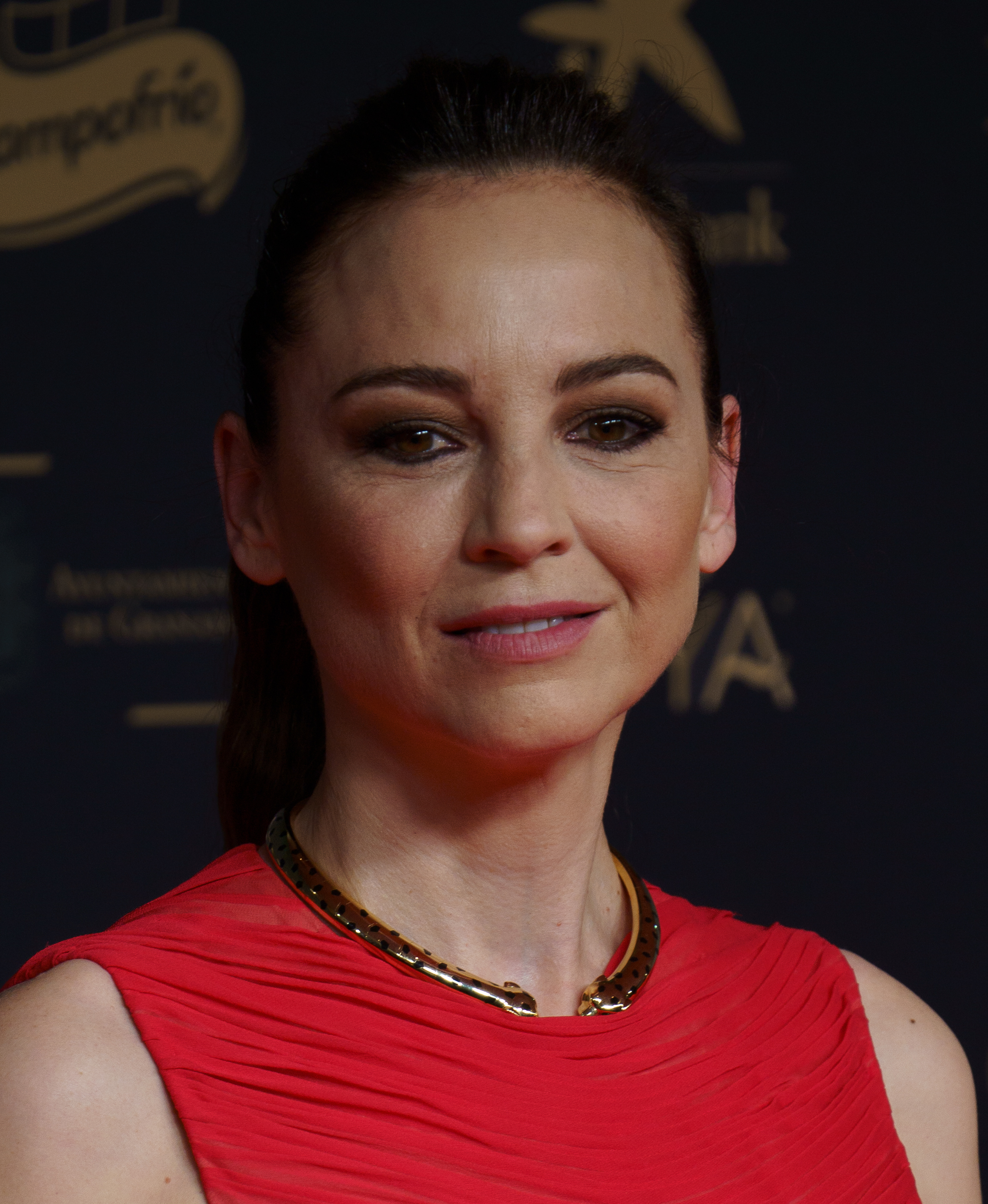
- Watling in 2025
- Born: Leonor Elizabeth Ceballos Watling; 28 July 1975 (age 51); Madrid, Spain
- Occupations: Actress; musician; lyricist
- Years active: 1993–present
- Partner: Jorge Drexler
- Musical career
- Genres: Jazz, blues, rock
- Instrument: Vocals
- Member of: Marlango

Leonor Elizabeth Ceballos Watling (born 28 July 1975) is a Spanish film actress and singer.

== Early life ==
Leonor Watling was born on 28 July 1975 in Madrid, to a Spanish father from Cádiz and an English mother, the youngest of four siblings (two brothers and two sisters). Her first vocation was that of dancer, but a knee injury made this impossible.

== Career ==
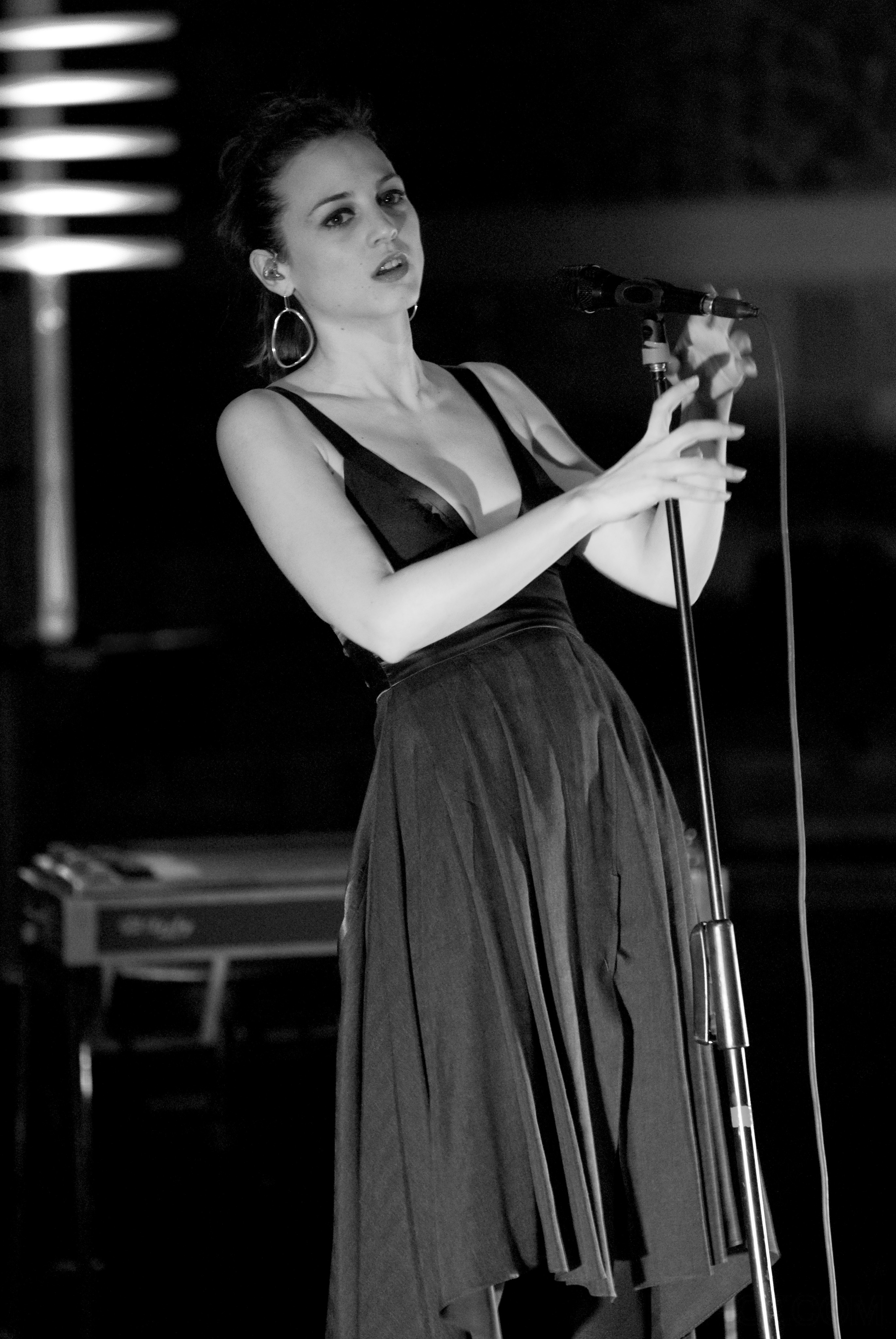
Watling performing with Marlango in 2008

Watling began her acting career in theatre. She earned her feature film debut with a performance in Pablo Llorca's Jardines colgantes (1993). After that she participated in several TV series, such as Hermanos de leche, Farmacia de guardia or Querido maestro, but her most successful role was in the series Raquel busca su sitio with Cayetana Guillén Cuervo. In 1998, she was nominated for a Goya award for her role in La hora de los valientes, and was named as one of European film's 'Shooting Stars' by European Film Promotion in 1999. In 2002, she was nominated again for a Goya for her role in My Mother Likes Women. The same year, she notably starred as Alicia Roncero in Pedro Almodovar’s chef-d’oeuvre Hable con ella (Talk to her).

Watling dubbed Anne Hathaway as the voice of "Red Pucket" (Little Red Riding Hood) in Hoodwinked (2005). She also took part in The Oxford Murders, alongside Elijah Wood and John Hurt.

In 2006, Watling starred in the Paris, Je T'aime segment "Bastille" as Marie Christine. The anthology film was directed by many famous directors who each had to produce a five-minute film set in Paris, the city of love. Spanish writer-director Isabel Coixet wrote and directed the segment "Bastille", and Watling starred alongside Sergio Castellitto and Miranda Richardson as Sergio's younger lover, with whom he plans to run away after ending his relationship with his wife Miranda.

She combines film performances with her work with the band Marlango, in which she is the vocalist and sings mostly in English.

She appeared in the TV series Pulsaciones.

== Personal life ==
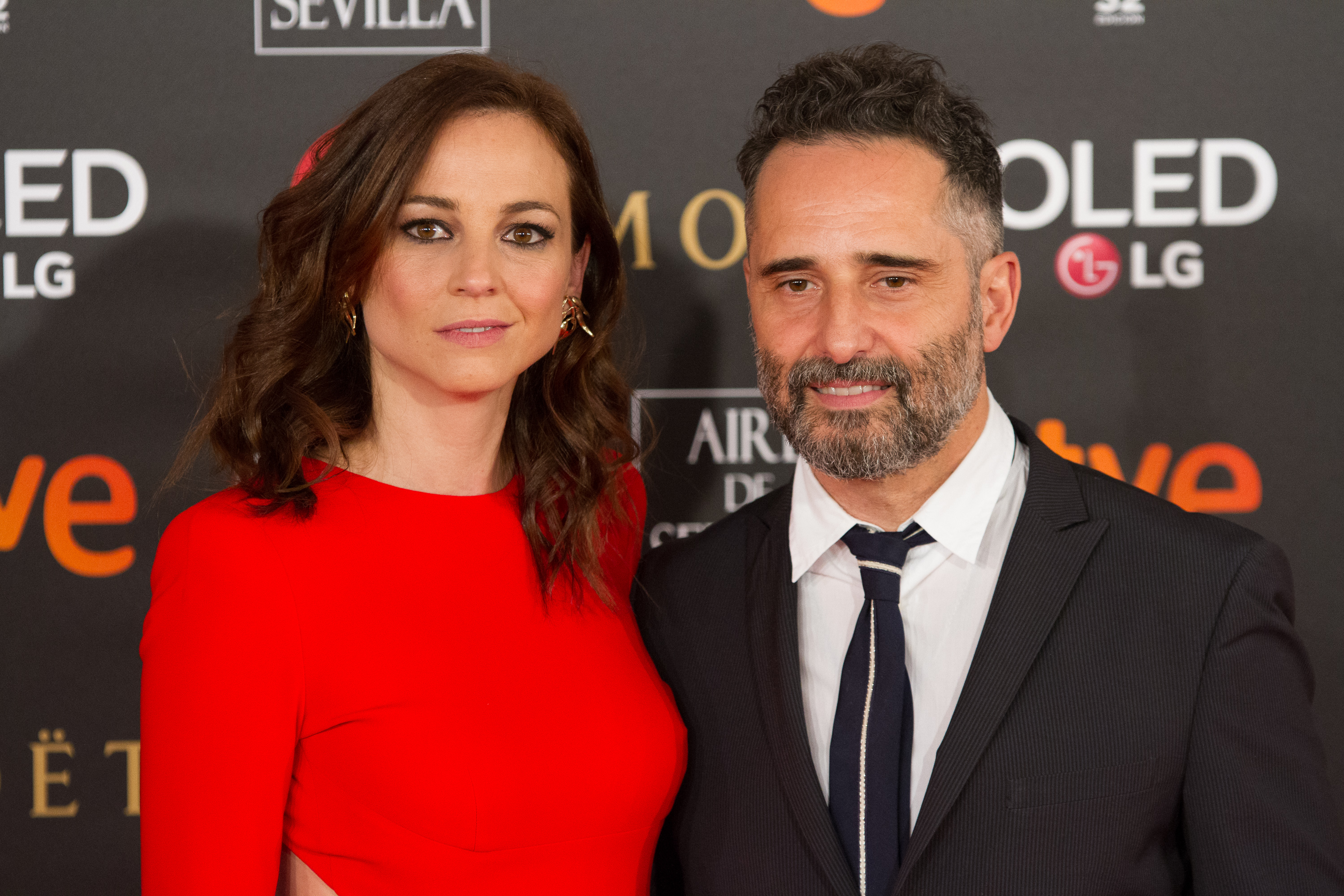
Watling and Jorge Drexler at the 32nd Goya Awards in 2018

Watling is in a relationship with the Uruguayan musician Jorge Drexler, with whom she has a son, Luca, born in January 2009, and a daughter, Lea, born in July 2011.

== Filmography ==
Key
†	Denotes films that have not yet been released

=== Film ===
Year	Title	Role	Notes	Ref.
1993	Jardines colgantes (Hanging Gardens)			
1997	Todas hieren	Beatriz		
1998	Grandes ocasiones (Great Occasions)	Bárbara		
1998	La primera noche de mi vida (The First Night of My Life)	Paloma		
1998	La hora de los valientes (A Time for Defiance)	Carmen		
1999	No respires (el amor está en el aire) (Do Not Breathe, Love is in the Air)	Muriel		
2000	La espalda de Dios (God's Back)			
2002	Son de mar (Sound of the Sea)	Martina		
2002	A mi madre le gustan las mujeres (My Mother Likes Women)	Elvira		
2002	Hable con ella (Talk to Her)	Alicia Roncero		
2002	Deseo (Desire)	Elvira		
2002	My Life Without Me	The other Ann		
2003	En la ciudad (In the City)	Cristina		
2003	El elefante del rey (The Elephant King)			
2003	Mauvais esprit	Carmen		
2004	La mala educación (Bad Education)	Mónica		
2004	Crónicas (Chronicles)			
2004	Inconscientes (Unconscious)	Alma		
2005	The Secret Life of Words			
2005	Malas temporadas (Hard Times)	Laura		
2005	Tirante el Blanco (White Tie)			
2006	Paris, je t'aime			
2006	Salvador (Puig Antich) (Salvador)	Cuca		
2006	El carnaval de Sodoma (Carnival of Sodom)			
2007	Teresa, el cuerpo de Cristo (Theresa: The Body of Christ)	Doña Guiomar de Ulloa		
2008	The Oxford Murders	Lorna		
2009	Unmade Beds			
2010	Viaje mágico a África (Magic Journey to Africa)	Hada ('fairy')		
2010	Lope (Lope: The Outlaw)	Isabel		
2011	Lo mejor de Eva (Dark Impulse)	Eva		
2012	If I Were You	Lucy		
2013	The Food Guide To Love			
2016	Risen			
2017	Muse			
2017	The Solar System (El sistema solar)	Inés		
2022	No mires a los ojos (Staring at Strangers)	Lucía		
2023	Chinas (Chinas, a Second Generation Story)	Sol		
2024	Anatema (Anathema)	Sor Juana		
TBA	La maleta †			

=== Television ===
Year	Title	Role	Notes	Ref.
1997–98	Querido maestro	Silvia		
2000	Raquel busca su sitio	Raquel	Leading role	
2006	La habitación del niño (The Child's Room)	Sonia	TV movie	
2017	Pulsaciones	Blanca Jiménez		
2018	Asesinato en la Universidad	Lara Cabanes	TV movie	
2018–20	Vivir sin permiso (Unauthorized Living)	Berta Moliner		
2020–	Nasdrovia	Edurne	Leading role	
2021	La templanza (The Vineyard)	Soledad Montalvo	Leading role. Younger version of the character performed by Carla Campra	
2021	Besos al aire (Blowing Kisses)	Doctora Cabanas	Leading role. Two-part television miniseries	
2022	No me gusta conducir (I Don't Like Driving)	Iria		
2024	Citas Barcelona	Joana		
2025	La vida breve	Isabel de Farnesio		
2026	Salvador	Carla		
TBA	Su majestad †	Amanda Montesinos	Season 2	

=== Video games ===
Year	Title	Role
2004	Prince of Persia: Warrior Within	Kaileena (voice)

Other

- "Somos Anormales", music video by Residente (2017)

== Discography ==
=== With Marlango ===
- Marlango (2004)
- Automatic Imperfection (2005)
- The Electrical Morning (2007)
- Life in the Treehouse (2010)
- Un Día Extraordinario (2012)
- El Porvenir (2014)
- Technicolor (2018)

=== Collaborations ===
- Miguel Bosé – Duet in "Este mundo va" from the album Papito
- Jorge Drexler – Backing vocals in "El otro engranaje" from the album 12 segundos de oscuridad
- Diego Vasallo – Backing vocals in "La vida mata" from the album Los abismos cotidianos
- Fito Páez – Duet in "Pétalo de sal" and "Creo" from the album No sé si es Baires o Madrid
- Jorge Drexler – Duet in "Toque de queda" from the album Amar la trama

== Accolades ==
Year	Award	Category	Work	Result	Ref.
1999	13th Goya Awards	Best Leading Actress	A Time for Defiance	Nominated	
2003	17th Goya Awards	Best Leading Actress	My Mother Likes Women	Nominated	
2003	53rd Fotogramas de Plata	Best Actress (film)	My Mother Likes Women	Won	
2003	12th Actors and Actresses Union Awards	Best Film Actress in a Leading Role	My Mother Likes Women	Nominated	
2004	59th CEC Medals	Best Supporting Actress	My Life Without Me	Won	
2004	13th Actors and Actresses Union Awards	Best Actress in a Minor Role (film)	My Life Without Me	Won	
2011	66th CEC Medals	Best Actress	Lope	Nominated	
2020	24th Actors and Actresses Union Awards	Best Television Actress in a Minor Role	Unauthorized Living	Nominated	
2023	10th Feroz Awards	Best Supporting Actress in a TV Series	I Don't Like Driving	Nominated	
2026	13th Feroz Awards	Best Supporting Actress in a Series	La vida breve	Nominated	
2026	34th Actors and Actresses Union Awards	Best Television Actress in a Secondary Role	La vida breve	Nominated	
