= Nothing in the Fridge =

- Theatrical release poster
- Spanish: Nada en la nevera
- Directed by: Álvaro Fernández Armero
- Screenplay by: Coloma Fernández Armero; Álvaro Fernández Armero
- Starring: María Esteve; Coque Malla; Roberto Álvarez; Laura Aparicio; Paul Zubillaga; Itziar Miranda; Paulina Gálvez
- Cinematography: Hans Burmann
- Edited by: Iván Aledo
- Music by: Manuel Villalta
- Production companies: Boca Boca Producciones; Aurum
- Distributed by: Columbia TriStar
- Release date: 23 October 1998
- Country: Spain
- Language: Spanish

Nothing in the Fridge (Spanish: Nada en la nevera) is a 1998 Spanish comedy film directed by Álvaro Fernández Armero which stars María Esteve and Coque Malla.

== Plot ==
Carlota works as an ambulance driver for the SAMUR. She becomes infatuated with a porno-comic artist (Number One), whom she meets after he suffers an indigestion from eating ten hard-boiled eggs. A trail of misunderstandings between them ensues.

== Cast ==
- María Esteve as Carlota
- Coque Malla as Number One
- Laura Aparicio as Juan
- Itziar Miranda as Natalia
- Roberto Álvarez as Rodrigo
- Paulina Gálvez as Blonde
- Santiago Lajusticia as Anaconda
- Paul Zubillaga

== Production ==
The screenplay was penned by siblings Coloma Fernández Armero and Álvaro Fernández Armero. The film was produced by Boca Boca alongside Aurum, and it had the participation of Antena 3 and Canal+.

== Release ==
Distributed by Columbia TriStar, the film was theatrically released in Spain on 23 October 1998.

== Reception ==
Jonathan Holland of Variety deemed the film to be a "a superficially pleasant comedy with dark undertones", featuring "a nice contempo feel and the occasional thought-provoking moment".

== Accolades ==
Year	Award	Category	Nominee(s)	Result	Ref.
1999	13th Goya Awards	Best New Actress	María Esteve	Nominated	

== See also ==
- List of Spanish films of 1998
