= Trileros =

Trileros is a 2003 Spanish comedy film directed by Antonio del Real and starring Juanjo Puigcorbé, Carlos Castel and Juan Echanove.
