= Marlango =

Spanish band

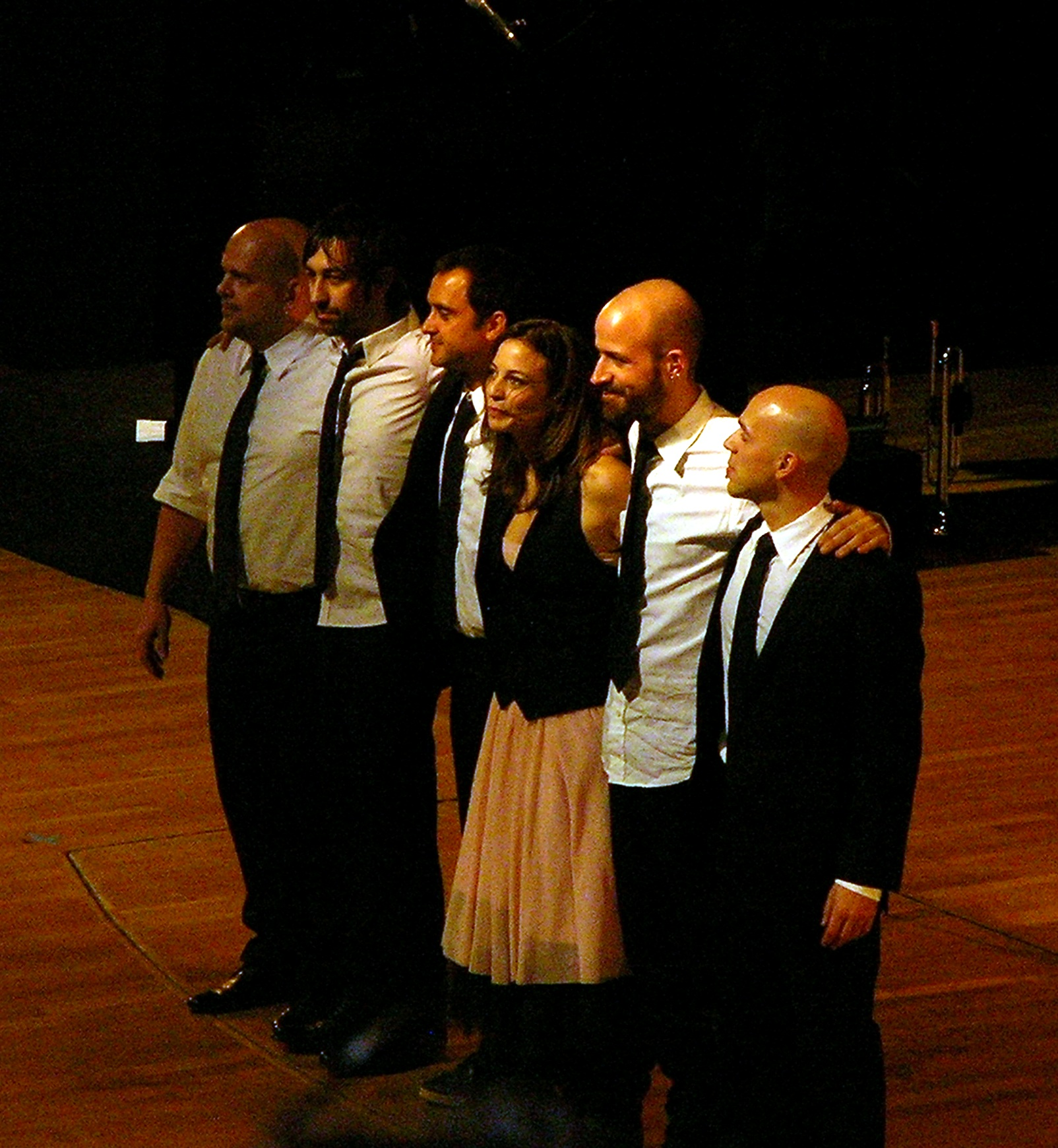
- The band (Murcia - 01/19/08)

Background information
- Origin: Madrid
- Genres: Jazz, blues, rock
- Years active: 2002-present
- Labels: Subterfuge, Universal
- Members: Alejandro Pelayo; Leonor Watling; Óscar Ybarra
- Website: www.marlango.net

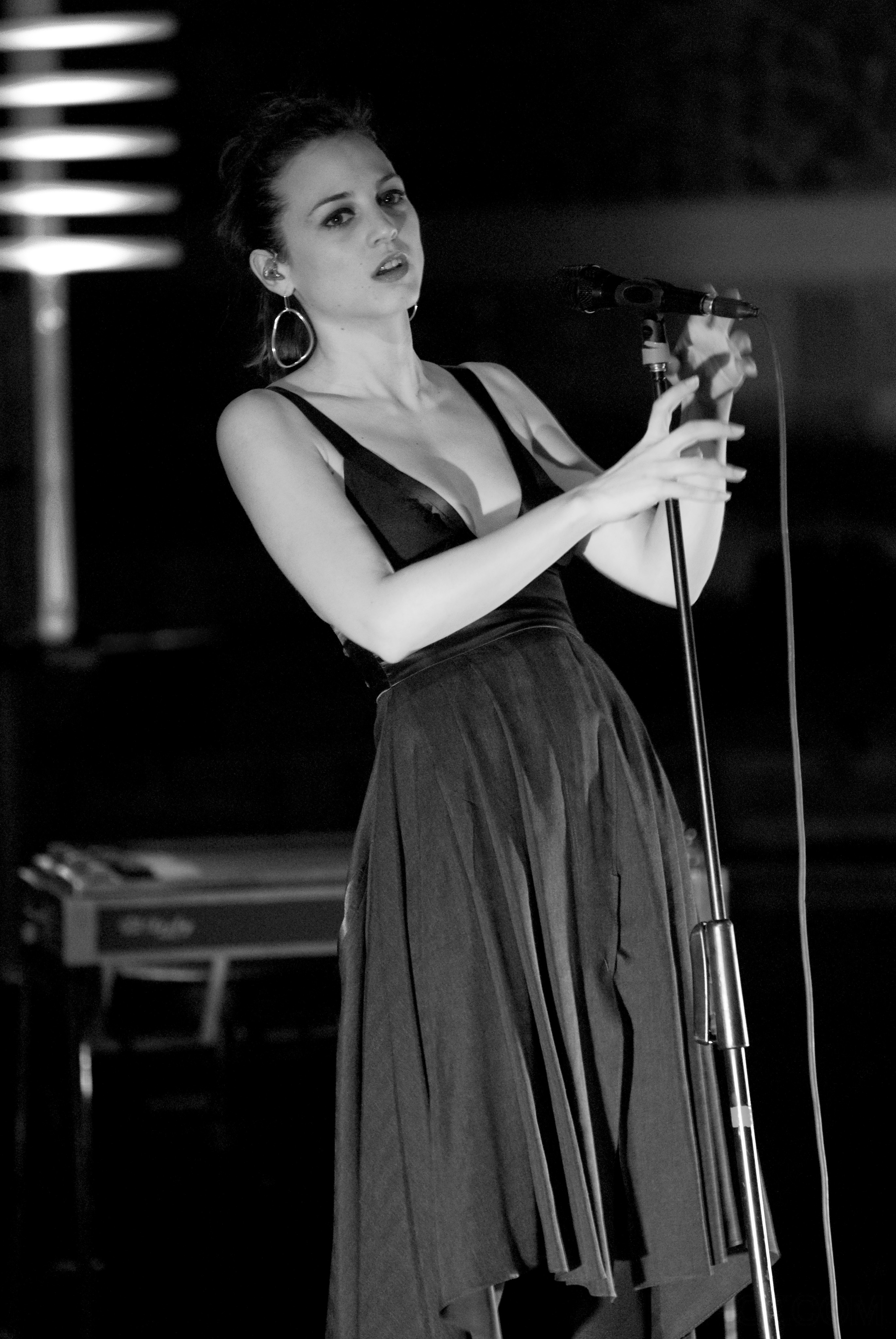
Leonor Watling singing in the band

Marlango is a Spanish music band deeply influenced by Tom Waits. The members of the band are Leonor Watling, Alejandro Pelayo and Óscar Ybarra.

== Discography ==
Year	Title	Chart position	Sales
Year	Title	SPA	Sales
2004	Marlango: First studio album; Launched: February 2004; Format: CD	9	100,000+
2005	Automatic Imperfection: Second studio album; Launched: 2005 September; Format: CD	4	60,000+
2007	The Electrical Morning: Third studio album; Launched: September 2007; Format: CD	12	25,000+
2010	Life in the Treehouse: Fourth studio album; Launched: March 2010; Format: CD	8	10,000+
2012	Un Día Extraordinario: Fifth studio album; Launched: April 2012; Format: CD	9	
2014	El Porvenir: Sixth studio album; Launched: October 2014; Format: CD	12	
2018	Technicolor: Seventh studio album; Launched: October 2018; Format: CD, download	3	
