= Etchegaray =

Etchegaray is a surname. A few notable people with this particular surname include:

- Roger Etchegaray (1922–2019), French cardinal
- Etchegaray (pelotari), French sportsman who competed at the 1900 Summer Olympics in Paris

== See also ==
- Echegaray
