= A Time for Defiance =

- Theatrical release poster
- Spanish: La hora de los valientes
- Directed by: Antonio Mercero
- Written by: Horacio Varcárcel; Antonio Mercero
- Produced by: Enrique Cerezo
- Starring: Gabino Diego; Leonor Watling; Adriana Ozores; Luis Cuenca; Héctor Colomé; Ramón Langa; Ramón Agirre; Aten Soria; Juan José Otegi; José María Pou
- Cinematography: Jaume Peracaula
- Edited by: José María Biurrún
- Music by: Bingen Mendizábal
- Production companies: Columbia Pictures; Antena 3 Vía Digital; Enrique Cerezo
- Distributed by: Columbia TriStar Films de España
- Release date: 18 December 1998
- Running time: 124 minutes
- Country: Spain
- Language: Spanish

A Time for Defiance (Spanish: La hora de los valientes; lit. 'The Hour of the Brave') is a 1997 Spanish war drama film directed by Antonio Mercero about the Spanish Civil War. It stars Gabino Diego and Leonor Watling alongside Luis Cuenca and Adriana Ozores.

== Plot ==
In Madrid, during the bombing of November 1936, in the Spanish Civil War, the Republican Government decided on the evacuation of paintings from the Prado Museum. Manuel, a 28-year-old security guard, finds a self-portrait of Goya abandoned in one corner. He hides the painting and flees the bombing of his house.

== Cast ==
- Gabino Diego as Manuel
- Leonor Watling as Carmen
- Adriana Ozores as Flora
- Luis Cuenca as Melquíades
- Héctor Colomé as Lucas
- Ramón Agirre as Gerardo
- Aten Soria as Filo
- Javier Bódalo as Pepito
- Juan José Otegui as Profesor Miralles
- José María Pou as Heliodoro
- Txema Blasco as Cuñado del profesor
- Ramón Langa

== Release ==
The film was theatrically released in Spain on 18 December 1998. It was also entered into the 21st Moscow International Film Festival where it won the Special Silver St. George.

== Accolades ==
Year	Award	Category	Nominee(s)	Result	Ref.
1999	13th Goya Awards	Best Actress	Leonor Watling	Nominated	
1999	13th Goya Awards	Best Actor	Gabino Diego	Nominated	
1999	13th Goya Awards	Best Supporting Actress	Adriana Ozores	Won	
1999	13th Goya Awards	Best Costume Design	Javier Artiñano	Nominated	
1999	13th Goya Awards	Production Supervision	Mikel Nieto	Nominated	
1999	13th Goya Awards	Best Special Effects	Juan Ramón Molina, Alfonso Nieto	Nominated	

== See also ==
- List of Spanish films of 1998
