= Daniel Guzmán (actor) =

Spanish actor, screenwriter, and director

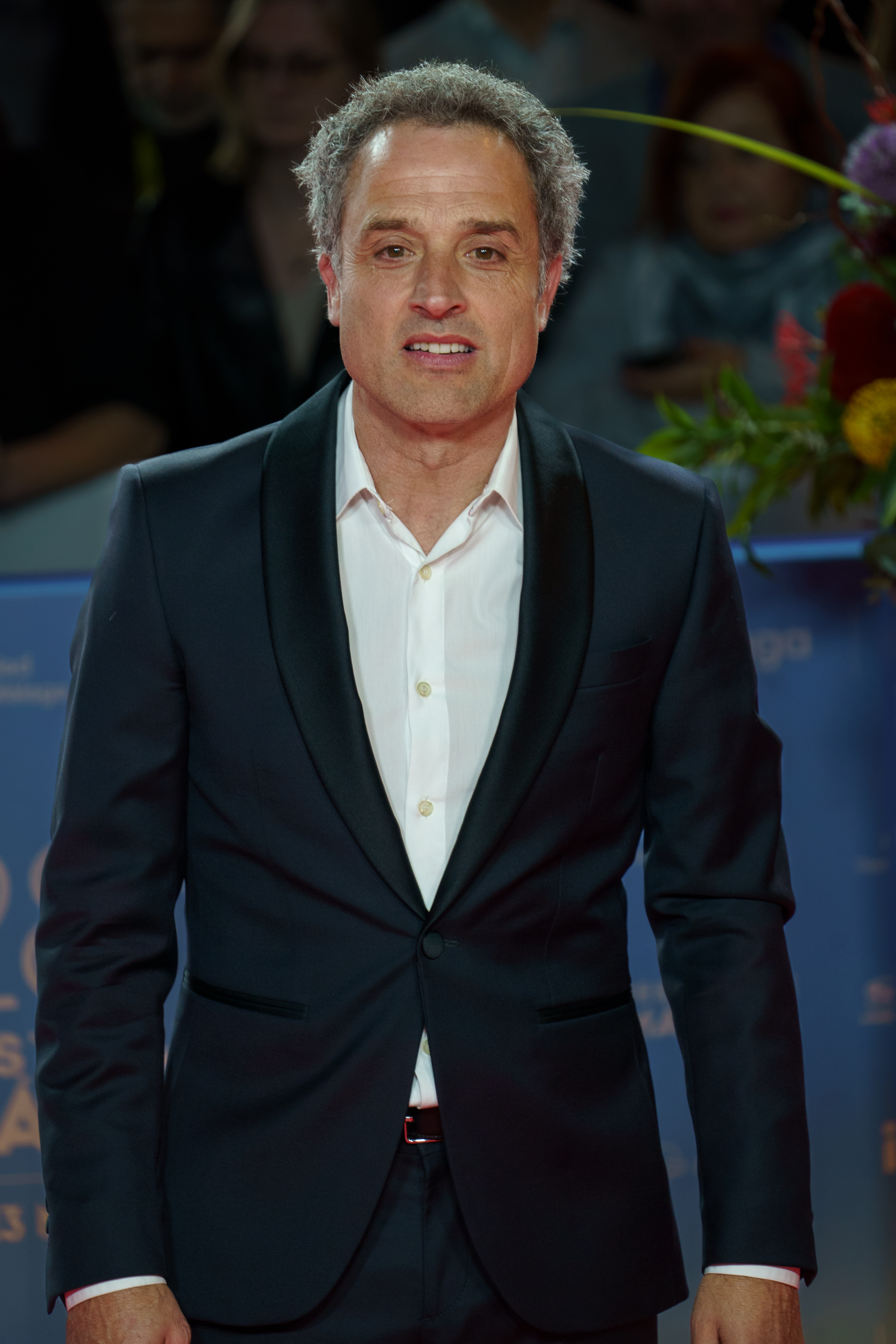
- Guzmán in 2025
- Born: 21 September 1973 (age 52); Madrid, Spain
- Occupations: Actor and film director

Daniel García-Pérez Guzmán (born 21 September 1973), known commonly as Daniel Guzmán, is a Spanish actor, screenwriter and film director.

== Biography ==
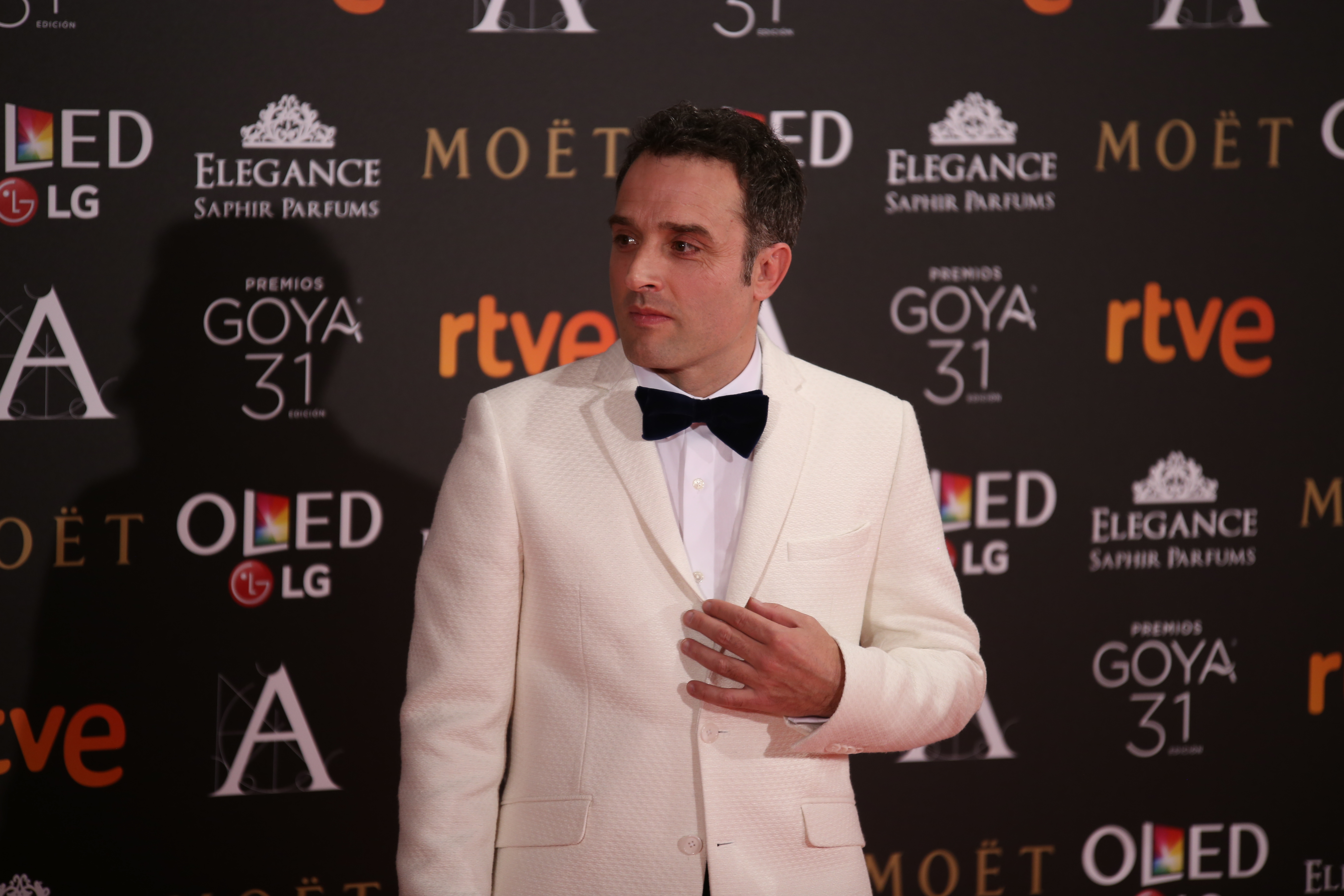
Daniel Guzmán at the Goya Awards in 2017.

He grew up in Las Águilas, an area of Madrid, where during his youth he painted graffiti under the pseudonym Tifón, in spite of a large part of the neighbourhood in Aluche being against his paintings. These paintings earned him a certain fame, to the point at which he co-led a docudrama called Mi Firma en las Paredes for the features programme Crónicas urbanas in 1990.

Various consecutive strokes of luck made him decide to dedicate himself full-time to acting. In 1994, Fernando León de Aranoa offered him a character in his short film Sirenas. He later obtained small roles in the films Hola, ¿estás sola? and Puede ser divertido. Shortly afterwards, he headlined the cast of Eso (1997), under the direction of Fernando Colomo, in which Daniel played Domingo, a man in his twenties obsessed over losing his virginity. In 1995 the casting director Sara Bilbatúa took advantage of the image Daniel offered in this film as a representative of a disorientated youth to include him in the cast of Éxtasis, where he played a criminal whose best friend (Rober: Javier Bardem) was confused with the lost son of an older man. His next complete film, Suerte, confirmed this profile, playing Toni, a character who robbed banks to start a new life with his girlfriend.

In his television works in the series Menudo es mi padre (1997), he changed style, taking the role of an exemplary student. After a cameo in Barrio, Daniel gained notable roles in El grito en el cielo and Rewind. In theatre, he starred in Yonquis y yanquis (1996–1997) and Joe Killer (1998).

Daniel returned that year to television in the series Policías, en el corazón de la calle (2000–2003) where he played Rafael, an undisciplined police officer who in his youth had trafficked drugs, and who was obligated to arrest his former friends until he was shot, leaving him paraplegic. Together with Josep Maria Pou, he was nominated for the Fotogramas de Plata awards for best television actor.

In the early 2000s he took up his political activity once again to actively participate in the protests against the Iraq War, during which he was arrested.

In February 2015, he played Lucas in the Antena 3 series Velvet. A year later he received the Goya award for Best New Director for the film A cambio de nada. In 2018 he switched to stage direction for Perfectos desconocidos, written by Paolo Genovese, which he helped adapt.

In August 2024, he was fined because he, accompanied of four strong men, attacked three people squatting in a vacant house he owned in Madrid. While the squatters did not initially know who owned the house, they had tried to contact him since he had expressed concern about the housing problem.

== Filmography (actor) ==
=== Film ===
- Puede ser divertido (1995) - Mensajero
- Hola, ¿estás sola? (1995) - Novio
- Éxtasis (1996) - Max
- Eso (1997) - Domingo
- Suerte (1996) - Toni
- El grito en el cielo (1998) - Salva
- Una pareja perfecta (1998) - Terry
- Barrio (1998) - Chico bar de copas
- Rewind (1999) - Andrés
- Aunque tú no lo sepas (2000) - Santi Joven
- El sueño del caimán (2001) - Iñaki
- Cuando todo esté en orden (2002) - Pablo
- A golpes (2005) - Fran
- Arena en los bolsillos (2005) - Mateo
- Mia Sarah (2006) - Gabriel
- Mi gran noche (2015) - Policía municipal
- En tu cabeza (2016) - Charli (segment 'Cabra y oveja')
- Bajo el mismo techo (2019) - Álex

=== Short ===
- Sirenas (1994)
- Maika (1994) - Amigo 3.
- Entrevías (1996) - Kike

=== Television ===
Year	Title	Character	Channel	Episodes
1994-1995	Menudo es mi padre		TVE	6 episodes
1995	Colegio Mayor		TVE	2 episodes
1996-1998	Menudo es mi padre	Juanvi	Antena 3	25 episodes
1999	Severo Ochoa. La conquista de un Nobel	Severo Ochoa (joven)	TVE	2 episodes
2000	Compañeros	Rafa	Antena 3	2 episodes
2000-2001	Policías, en el corazón de la calle	Rafael "Rafa" Trujillo	Antena 3	45 episodes
2003	London Street	Paco	Antena 3	4 episodes
2003-2006	Aquí no hay quien viva	Roberto Alonso Castillo	Antena 3	75 episodes
2007-2009	La familia Mata	Pablo Aguilar	Antena 3	26 episodes
2014-2015	Velvet	Lucas Ruiz Lagasca	Antena 3	4 episodes

=== Theatre ===
- 1989: Sueño de una noche.
- 1989: La zapatera prodigiosa.
- 1993: Fronteras.
- 1993: La dama boba.
- 1994: Peter Pan.
- 1996-1997: Yonquis y yanquis.
- 1998: Joe Killer.
- 2013-2014: Los miércoles no existen
- 2015: Recortes
- 2016: Los tragos de la vida
- 2017: Dos más dos

== Filmography (director) ==
- Sueños (2003, short film)
- A cambio de nada (2015)
- Canallas (2022)
- The Redemption (2025)

== Awards and nominations ==
=== Goya awards ===
Year	Film	Category	Result
2004	Sueños	Best Fictional Short Film	Won
2016
2016	A cambio de nada		
2016	A cambio de nada	Best Film	Nominated
2016	A cambio de nada	Best Original Screenplay	Nominated
2016	A cambio de nada	Best New Director	Won

- Málaga Film Festival:
  - Golden Biznaga for A cambio de nada, his first film as a director (2015)
  - Silver Biznaga for Best Director
  - Silver Biznaga: Critic's Prize
  - Public Prize (2002)
- Alcalá de Henares Cinema Festival:
  - Public prize of the Certamen Open Screen for A cambio de nada (2015)
- Golden Sprig at the International Festival of Valladolid: Best short film (2002)
