= Cha-cha-chá (1998 film) =

- Theatrical release poster
- Directed by: Antonio del Real
- Screenplay by: Fernando León; Carlos Asorey; Antonio del Real
- Produced by: César Benítez
- Starring: Eduardo Noriega; Ana Álvarez; María Adánez; Jorge Sanz; Gabino Diego; Marta Belaustegui; Elisa Matilla
- Cinematography: Juan Amorós
- Edited by: Miguel A. Santamaría
- Music by: Pablo Miyar
- Production company: Sogetel
- Distributed by: Sogepaq
- Release date: 10 July 1998
- Country: Spain
- Language: Spanish

Cha-cha-chá is a 1998 Spanish madcap comedy film directed by Antonio del Real. It stars Eduardo Noriega, Ana Álvarez, María Adánez and Jorge Sanz.

== Plot ==
María is in a relationship with Pablo, whom longtime María's friend Lucía gets infatuated with after sleeping one night with him. Lucía enlists the services of Antonio, a lower-class wannabe male model, to seduce María "away" from Pablo.

== Cast ==
- Eduardo Noriega as Antonio
- Ana Álvarez as Lucía
- María Adánez as María
- Jorge Sanz as Pablo
- Gabino Diego as Gustavo
- Elisa Matilla
- Marta Belaustegui
- Antonio Medina

== Production ==
The screenplay was penned by Fernando León and Carlos Asorey alongside Antonio del Real. The film was produced by Sogetel in collaboration with Tele 5, and it also had participation of Canal+. Juan Amorós was responsible for the cinematography whereas Pablo Miyar was responsible for the music and Miguel Angel Santamaría for film editing. César Benítez took over production duties.

== Release ==
The film received a pre-screening in Bilbao. Distributed by Sogepaq, it was theatrically released on 10 July 1998. The film proved to be one of the biggest hits in the Spanish box office in 1998. As of November 1998, it had grossed around 285 million ₧, good for a third position in the ranking of Spanish films up to that point.

== Reception ==
Jonathan Holland of Variety deemed the "swiftly paced but largely routine" Antonio del Real's film to be a "by-the-book relationships movie about twentysomething love".

== See also ==
- List of Spanish films of 1998
