= Javier Tomeo =

Spanish writer (1932–2013)

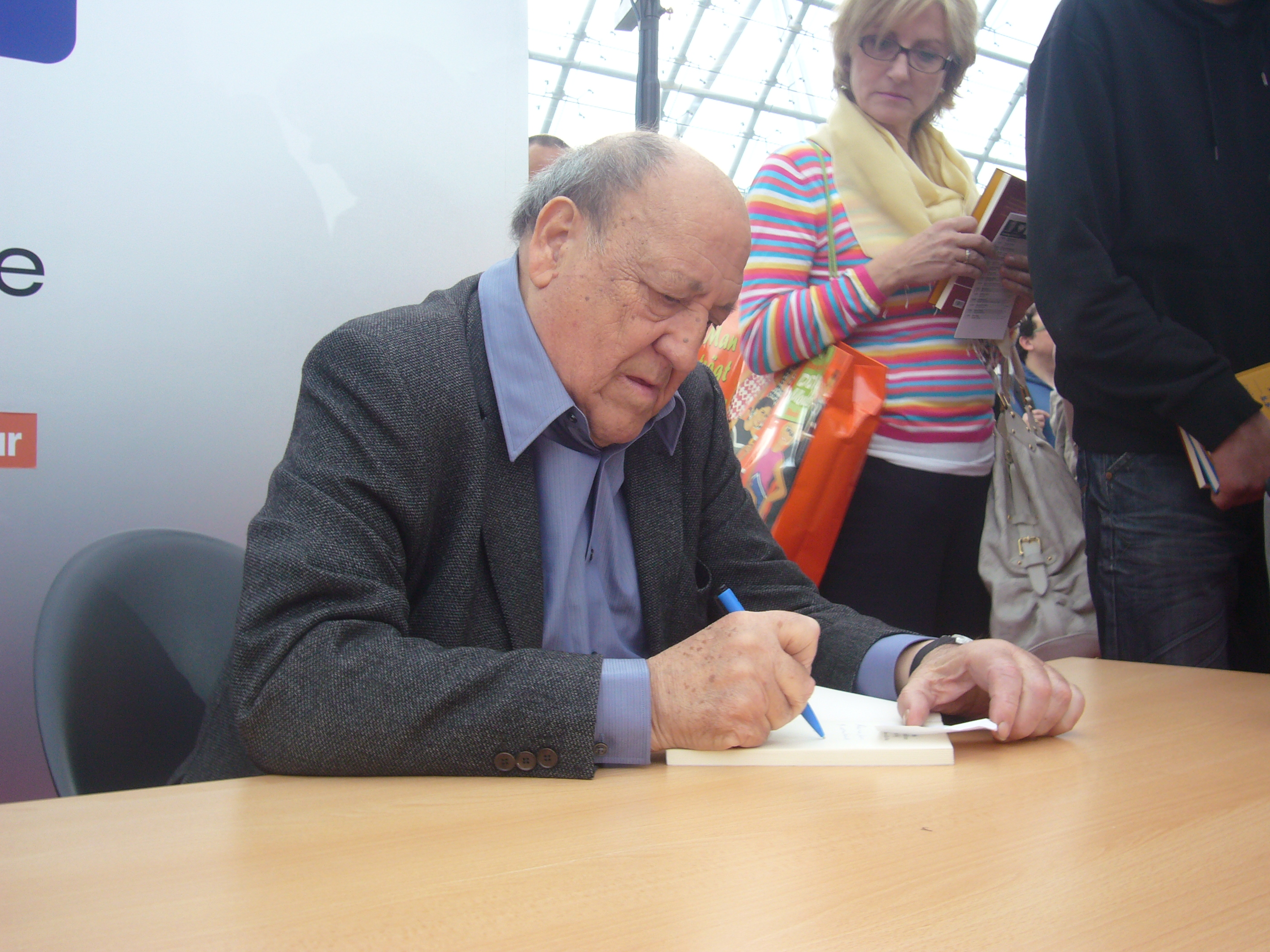

Javier Tomeo (9 September 1932 – 22 June 2013) was a Spanish (Aragonese) essayist, dramatist, and novelist.

Two of Tomeo's works have been translated into English, The Coded Letter (1979) and Dear Monster (1984), by Anthony Edkins in 1991.

== Biography ==
He graduated with degrees in Law and Criminology from the University of Barcelona.

In the 1950s, he wrote popular literature under the pseudonym "Frantz Keller" for Editorial Bruguera, including some Western novels, horror stories, and even a Historia de la esclavitud (History of Slavery), as well as other works under Anglicized pseudonyms.

In 1963, alongside Juan María Estadella, he published La brujería y la superstición en Cataluña (Witchcraft and Superstition in Catalonia).

In 1967, he published his first "serious" novel.

In 1971, he won the Ciudad de Barbastro Short Novel Prize for El Unicornio.

In the 1970s, other titles appeared, such as El castillo de la carta cifrada.

In the 1980s, he wrote novels such as Diálogo en re mayor and Amado monstruo. His literary universe expanded in the 1990s with the publication of numerous books, including El gallitigre (1990), El crimen del cine Oriente (1995), Los misterios de la ópera (1997), Napoleón VII (1999), and Cuentos perversos (2002), among others.

He lived alone, had no siblings, and had no children.

In the final months of his life, he suffered from multiple complications related to diabetes and died at the age of 80 from a severe infection at the Sagrado Corazón Hospital in Barcelona.

On June 26, 2013, a civil funeral was held in Barcelona. On June 27, he was buried in the cemetery of Quicena.

== Bibliography ==
- Historia de la esclavitud, [con el pseudónimo Frantz Keller, Barcelona: Forma] (1962)
- La brujería y la superstición en Cataluña [junto a Juan María Estadella] (1963)
- El cazador (1967)
- Ceguera al azul (1969)
- El unicornio (1971)
- Los enemigos (1974)
- El castillo de la carta cifrada (1979). Translated by Anthony Edkins as The Coded Letter (1991)
- Amado monstruo (1984). Translated by Anthony Edkins as Dear Monster (1991)
- Historias mínimas (1988)
- El cazador de leones (1989)
- La ciudad de las palomas (1990)
- El mayordomo miope (1990)
- El gallitigre (1990)
- El discutido testamento de Gastón de Puyparlier(1990)
- Problemas oculares (1990)
- Patio de butacas (1991)
- Preparativos de viaje (1991)
- Diálogo en re mayor (1991)
- La agonía de Proserpina (1993)
- Zoopatías y zoofilias(1993)
- Los reyes del huerto (1994)
- El nuevo bestiario (1994)
- El crimen del cine Oriente (1995)
- Conversaciones con mi amigo Ramón (1995)
- Los bosques de Nyx (1995)
- La máquina voladora (1996)
- Los misterios de la ópera (1997)
- Un día en el zoo (1997)
- El alfabeto (1997)
- Napoleón VII (1999)
- La rebelión de los rábanos (1999)
- Patíbulo interior (2000)
- La patria de las hormigas (2000)
- Otoño en Benasque, los Pirineos (2000)
- Bestiario (2000)
- El canto de las tortugas (2000)
- La soledad de los pirómanos (2001)
- Cuentos perversos (2002)
- La mirada de la muñeca hinchable (2003)
- Los nuevos inquisidores (2004)
- El cantante de boleros (2005)
- Doce cuentos de Andersen contados por dos viejos verdes (2005)
- La noche del lobo (2006)
- Bestiario (illustrated by Natalio Bayo) (2007)
- Los amantes de silicona (2008)
- Pecados griegos (2009)
