= Barrio (film) =

- Theatrical release poster
- Directed by: Fernando León de Aranoa
- Written by: Fernando León de Aranoa
- Produced by: Elías Querejeta
- Starring: Críspulo Cabezas; Timy Benito; Eloi Yebra; Marieta Orozco; Alicia Sánchez; Enrique Villén; Francisco Algora; Chete Lera
- Cinematography: Alfredo Mayo
- Edited by: Nacho Ruiz Capillas
- Music by: Hechos Contra el Decoro
- Production companies: Elías Querejeta P.C.; Mact Productions; Sogetel; MGN Filmes
- Distributed by: Warner Sogefilms
- Release date: 8 October 1998
- Running time: 105 minutes
- Country: Spain
- Language: Spanish
- Box office: €2.92 million

Barrio (lit. 'Neighborhood') is a 1998 Spanish film directed by Fernando León de Aranoa. It won several awards including Best Director at the 13th Goya Awards, and was also nominated for Best Picture.

== Plot ==
In Madrid, 15-year-olds Manu, Javi and Rai spend summer around their neighborhood as their families cannot afford going on vacation. Although they share wishes of having sex and traveling, they each face different problems. Manu misses his deceased mother, as well as his brother Rafa, who according to his father is a successful businessman traveling abroad. Javi lives with his sister Susana, their argumentative parents and a deaf grandfather. Rai often steals from cars and shops, and is romantically interested in Susana.

Unknown to his father, Manu begins working as a delivery driver, lying to his employer about owning a motorbike, as he plans to make the deliveries by bus. Rai and Javi steal yogurt from a supermarket, whose brand offers paid vacations as a prize. One day the three steal a bouquet from a graveyard and attempt to sell the flowers at a bar. Rai tries to flirt with a girl but is confronted by her boyfriend and they are forced to leave. The next morning, Rai learns by mail that he has won the prize but is disappointed to learn that it is a jet ski, completely useless in their neighborhood, so it is simply left chained to a streetlight on his apartment's front.

To cheer Rai up and inspired by the jet ski, Javi and Manu arrange a mock tropical-themed party. They later visit Rai's brother, a night watchman at an apartment complex, as he has promised to show them his gun. Rai's brother leaves to the entrance to have sex with his girlfriend, while Manu and Javi masturbate watching them through CCTV. However, they stop when Rai pretends to shoot himself as a joke and get angry with him for scaring them.

One day, Manu, still making deliveries by bus, is startled when his father unexpectedly boards. Manu hides in the rear seats, but is confused when his father inexplicably disembarks at a random clearing. Meanwhile, Javi arrives home and Susana, in tears, tells him that their mother has put a restraining order on their father as he physically abused her in secret. While the three meet, they are arrested by the police, revealing that Rai is a drug dealer. Rai spends the night in jail and lies to his family about staying at Javi's home.

Javi visits his father, who is now divorced and living in a van. During their conversation, his father comes to terms with the fact that his marriage is irreparably broken and accepts responsibility for its failure. Meanwhile, Manu asks for a wish blowing his birthday candles with his father. At night, the three celebrate Manu's birthday at a disco, discover a shanty town while venturing into the metro's tunnels and rob a trophy store. Nearing home, Rai is enraged to discover that the jet ski has been stolen. However, Rai's mood quickly lifts when Manu remarks that the jet ski was useless to begin with. Back at home, Manu discovers a watch on his bed, wrapped as an expensive gift from his brother. However, he discovers the same brand of watch at a local sales store.

Suspicious, Manu follows the path that his father took the previous day and is shocked to discover his brother living at a slum as a heroin addict. When Manu tells his father that he knows the truth, he begins crying, but Manu reassures him that at least his birthday wish of meeting his brother again has been fulfilled.

Rai goes to Javi's home to meet with Susana. While she gets ready, Rai attempts to steal a car radio, but its owner, a police officer, confronts him. He demands Rai to stay still while pointing a gun at him, but Rai does not comply and is shot. Javi meets up with Manu at the metro and suffers a breakdown, while the local newscast informs that a minor has been killed.

== Cast ==
- Críspulo Cabezas as Raimundo "Rai" Martin Llanes
- Timy Benito as Javi
- Eloi Yebra as Manu
- Marieta Orozco as Susi, Javi's sister
- Alicia Sánchez as Carmen, Javi's mother
- Enrique Villén as Ricardo, Javi's father
- Francisco Algora as Ángel, Manu's father
- Chete Lera as police inspector

== Production ==
The film was produced by Elías Querejeta. It was shot in Madrid, primarily in San Blas and La Elipa, but also in Aluche, Hortaleza, Carabanchel and Villaverde. The film was lensed by Alfredo Mayo, edited by Nacho Ruiz Capillas, and scored by Hechos Contra el Decoro.

== Release ==
Distributed by Warner Sogefilms, the film was released on 2 October 1998. The film grossed 2.92 million € at the box office.

== Awards and nominations ==
Year	Award	Category	Nominee(s)	Result	Ref.
1999	13th Goya Awards	Best Film		Nominated	
1999	13th Goya Awards	Best Director	Fernando León de Aranoa	Won	
1999	13th Goya Awards	Best Original Screenplay	Fernando León de Aranoa	Won	
1999	13th Goya Awards	Best Supporting Actor	Francisco Algora	Nominated	
1999	13th Goya Awards	Best Supporting Actress	Alicia Sánchez	Nominated	
1999	13th Goya Awards	Best New Actress	Marieta Orozco	Won	
1999	4th Forqué Awards	Best Film		Won	

== See also ==
- List of Spanish films of 1998
