= Echegaray =

Echegaray (from Basque Etxegarai) is a surname meaning Hillhouse. Notable people with the surname include:

- José Echegaray (1832–1916), Spanish mathematician, dramatist and statesman
- Leo Echegaray (1960–1999), Filipino criminal

== See also ==
- Etchegaray
