= Mararía =

Book by Rafael Arozarena

- Author: Rafael Arozarena
- Language: Spanish
- Genre: Novel
- Publisher: Noguer
- Media type: Print

Mararía (1973) is a novel by the Spanish Canarian writer Rafael Arozarena. Published in Barcelona by Noguer in 1973, it was subsequently turned into a successful film in 1998. Mararía is considered a classic work of Canarian literature.

== Plot summary ==
A traveler goes to the village of Femés in Lanzarote. There he takes an interest in Maria, called "Mararía" by the villagers, who walks in the shadows at night. The inhabitants tell him stories about her; it seems everyone has been entrapped by her in the past. All of her relationships ended badly, and she was held to be responsible. Now she is an old woman who walks in the dark and endures barking dogs and people's comments. She is presented as a symbol of purification and self-destruction.
