= Josep Maria Pou =

Catalan actor

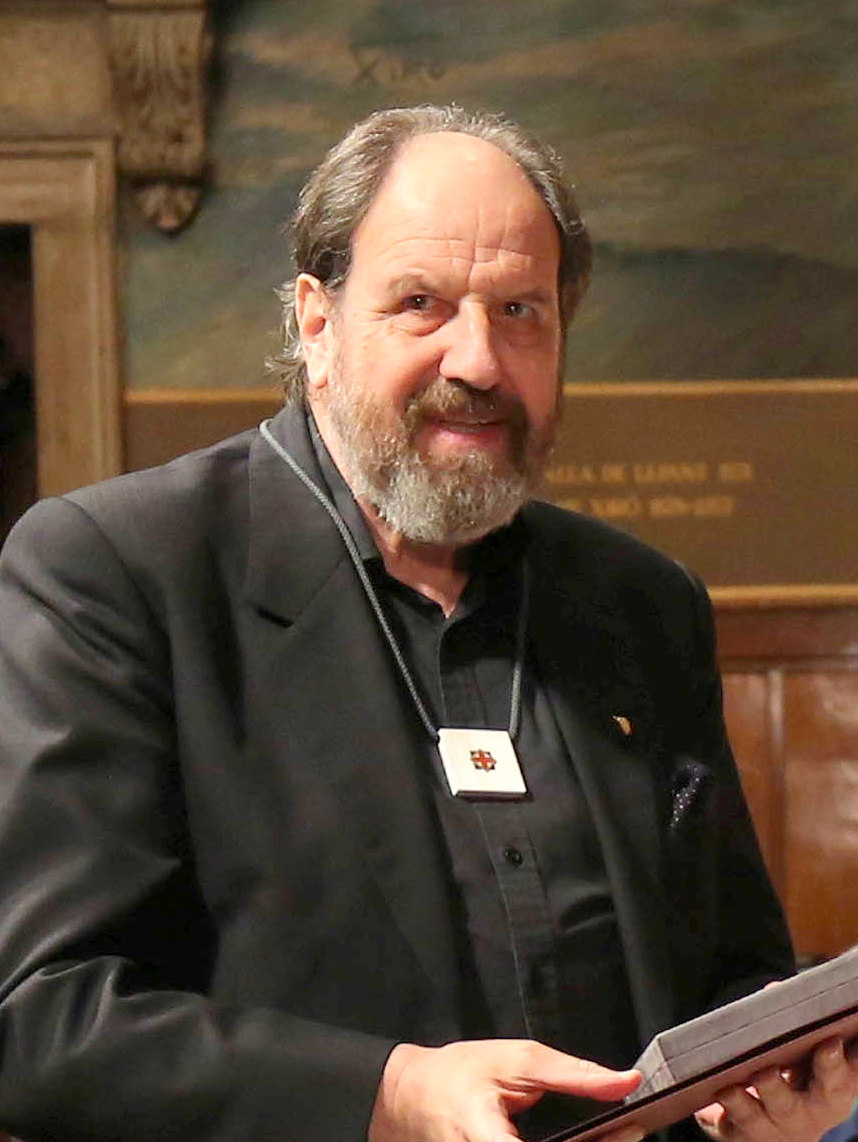
- Born: José María Pou Serra; 19 November 1944 (age 81); Mollet del Vallès, Spain
- Other names: José María Pou; José Mª Pou
- Education: RESAD
- Occupation: Actor
- Children: 2

Josep Maria Pou i Serra (born 19 November 1944), also credited as José María Pou, is a Spanish film, theatre and television actor from Catalonia.

== Life and career ==
Pou was born on 19 November 1944 in Mollet del Vallès. He studied at the Universidad Laboral "Francisco Franco" in Tarragona, and studied acting at the RESAD in Madrid. He made his debut at Teatro María Guerrero in 1970.

== Cinema ==
- 2018 The Realm
- 2017 Abracadabra
- 2012 Blancanieves
- 2007 Barcelona (un mapa), Ventura Pons
- 2006 Miguel y William, Inés París
- 2004 Beneath still waters, Brian Yuzna
- 2003 Mar adentro, Alejandro Amenábar
- 2003 Tiovivo c. 1950, José Luis Garci
- 2003 Sevignè, Marta Balletbó
- 2003 Las viandas (cortometraje), José A. Bonet
- 1998 Goya en Burdeos, Carlos Saura
- 1998 Pepe Guindo, Manuel Iborra
- 1998 Amic/Amat, Ventura Pons
- 1998 La hora de los valientes, Antonio Mercero
- 1997 Subjudice, Josep María Forn
- 1997 Los años bárbaros, Fernando Colomo
- 1996 El crimen del cine Oriente, Pedro Costa
- 1995 La duquesa roja, Francesc Betriu
- 1995 El efecto mariposa, Fernando Colomo
- 1995 Tot veri, (Puro veneno), Xavier Ribera
- 1995 Gran Slalom, Jaime Chávarri
- 1994 Hermana, ¿pero qué has hecho, Pedro Masó
- 1994 Historias del Kronen, Montxo Armendáriz
- 1993 El pájaro de la felicidad, Pilar Miró
- 1991 Los papeles de Aspern, Jordi Cadena
- 1989 La bañera, Jesús Garay
- 1989 Pont de Varsovia, Pere Portabella
- 1987 Berlen blues, Ricardo Franco
- 1987 Remando al viento, Gonzalo Suárez
- 1987 El complot dels anells, Francesc Bellmunt
- 1986 Madrid, Basilio Martin Patiño
- 1986 Hay que deshacer la casa, José Luis García Sánchez
- 1985 El caballero del dragón, Fernando Colomo
- 1984 La noche más hermosa, Manuel Gutiérrez Aragón
- 1981 Adolescencia, Germán Lorente
- 1977 Reina Zanahoria, Gonzalo Suárez
- 1976 El segundo poder, José María Forqué
- 1975 La espada negra, Francisco Rovira Beleta
- 1974 La madrastra, Roberto Gavaldón
- 1973 La mujer prohibida, José Luis Ruiz Marcos

== Theatre ==
- 2006-2007 La nit just abans dels boscos, by Bernard-Marie Koltès.
- 2005-2007 La cabra o Qui és Sylvia? /La cabra o ¿quién es Sylvia? (The Goat or Who Is Sylvia?), by Edward Albee.
- 2004-2005 El rei Lear/El rey Lear (King Lear), by William Shakespeare
- 2003-2004 Celobert (Skylight), by David Hare
- 2003 Bartleby, l'escrivent (Bartleby, the Scrivener), by Herman Melville
- 2003 Estrellas bajo las estrellas Festival de Teatro de Mérida
- 1998 Arte (Art), by Yasmina Reza
- 1997 The Seagull (Чайка), by Anton Chekhov (Антон Павлович Чехов)
- 1996-1997 Àngels a Amèrica (Angels in America), by Tony Kushner
- 1994 La corona d'espines, by Josep Maria de Sagarra
- 1993 Espectres/Espectros (Gengangere), by Henrik Ibsen
- 1993 Golfos de Roma (A Funny Thing Happened on the Way to the Forum), by Stephen Sondheim
- 1993 El cazador de leones, by Javier Tomeo
- 1991 La verdad sospechosa, by Juan Ruiz de Alarcón
- 1991 El gallitigre, de Javier Tomeo
- 1991 Desig, by Josep Maria Benet i Jornet
- 1989 Amado monstruo, by Javier Tomeo
- 1988 Lorenzaccio, de Alfred de Musset
- 1987 És així, si us ho sembla (Così è, se vi pare), by Luigi Pirandello
- 1985 The Mistress of the Inn, by Carlo Goldoni
- 1985 Anselmo B, by Francisco Melgares
- 1984 Al derecho y al revés (Noises Off ), by Michael Fryan
- 1984 El dúo de la africana, by Echegaray and Fernández Caballero
- 1984 Las mujeres sabias (Les femmes savantes), by Molière
- 1983 El barón, by Moratín
- 1983 Casa de muñecas (Et dukkehjem), by Henrik Ibsen
- 1982 El sombrero de copa, by Vital Aza
- 1982 Coronada y el toro, by Francisco Nieva
- 1981 El galán fantasma, by Calderón de la Barca
- 1978 El médico a palos (Le Médecin malgré lui ), by Molière
- 1978 Las bacantes (The Bacchae), by Euripides
- 1978 Las galas del difunto y la hija del capitán, by Valle-Inclán
- 1976 La carroza de plomo candente, by Francisco Nieva
- 1976 Galileo Galilei, de Bertolt Brecht
- 1973 Canta, gallo acorralado (Cock-a-Doodle Dandy ), by Seán O'Casey
- 1973 La ciudad en la que reina un niño (La Ville dont le prince est un enfant ), by Henry de Montherlant
- 1973 Las tres hermanas (Три сестры, Three Sisters (play)) by Anton Chekhov (Антон Павлович Чехов)
- 1972 Los caciques, by Carlos Arniches
- 1972 Misericordia, by Benito Pérez Galdós
- 1971 Dulcinea, by Gaston Baty
- 1971 Antígona, ( Antigone, Ἀντιγόνη) by Sophocles (Σοφοκλῆς)
- 1971 El círculo de tiza caucasiano, (Der Kaukasische Kreidekreis) by Bertolt Brecht
- 1970 Romance de lobos, by Valle-Inclán
- 1969 Los Fantástikos (The Fantastiks ), by Tom Jones and Harvey Schmidt
- 1968 Marat-Sade, by Peter Weiss

== Television ==
- 2018 La Catedral del Mar (Cathedral of the Sea), Sahat
- 2016 Nit i dia, Benet
- 2007 Quart, Monseñor Aguirre
- 2001 Carles, príncep de Viana
- Estació d'enllaç
- Investigación Policial
- El Club de la Comedia
- Siete Vidas
- Policías, en el corazón de la calle
- 1974 Estudio 1 con la obra Las Meninas
- 2005 Un Personatge, un paisatge

== Main prizes ==
- 2007
  - Premio Terenci Moix.
  - Premios Max al mejor director de escena por La cabra o quién es Sylvia,
  - Premios Max al mejor espectáculo,
  - Premios Max a la mejor adaptación teatral
  - Premios Max al mejor empresario.
- 2004 Premi Nacional de Teatre de la Generalitat de Catalunya.
- 2002 Premio de Interpretación en el Festival Internacional de TV. de Venecia
- 1988 Premi Sant Jordi de Cinematografia for EL COMPLOT DELS ANELLS
- 1984 Premio Ricardo Calvo del Ayuntamiento de Madrid al mejor actor
- 4 Premis de la Crítica de Barcelona
