= Fetasiano group =

Spanish literary group

The Fetasiano group were a group of writers from the Canary Islands between the 1950s and the 1970s. It included Rafael Arozarena (1923–2009), Antonio Bermejo (1926–1987), José Antonio Padrón (1932–1993) and Isaac de Vega (1920–2014). It is named after the novel Fetasa (1957) by Isaac de Vega. It was a literary movement that broke with the social and committed literature of the period, and took a more dreamy and symbolic direction.
