= The First Night of My Life =

- Spanish: La primera noche de mi vida
- Directed by: Miguel Albaladejo
- Screenplay by: Elvira Lindo; Miguel Albaladejo
- Produced by: Mariel Guiot
- Starring: Carlos Fuentes; Leonor Watling; Mariola Fuentes; Juanjo Martínez; Emilio Gutiérrez Caba
- Cinematography: Alfonso Sanz Alduán
- Edited by: Ángel Hernández Zoido
- Music by: Lucio Godoy
- Production companies: Alphaville; Haut & Court; La Sept/Arte
- Distributed by: Lolafilms
- Release date: 19 June 1998 (Spain)
- Running time: 1h 22min
- Countries: Spain; France
- Language: Spanish

The First Night of My Life (Spanish: La primera noche de mi vida) is a 1998 Spanish-French comedy film directed by Miguel Albaladejo.

== Cast ==
- Leonor Watling as Paloma
- Juanjo Martínez as Manuel
- Carlos Fuentes as Johnny
- Roberto Hernández as Litri
- Emilio Gutiérrez Caba as padre de Paloma
- Mariola Fuentes as Jasmina
- Anna Lizaran as madre de Joselito

== Production ==
The film was developed as a part of the 2000, Seen By... project, initiated by the French company Haut et Court to produce films depicting the approaching turn of the millennium seen from the perspectives of 10 different countries.

== Release ==
Distributed by Lolafilms, the film was released theatrically in Spain on 19 June 1998.

== See also ==
- List of Spanish films of 1998
