= Antonio del Real =

Spanish film director (born 1947)

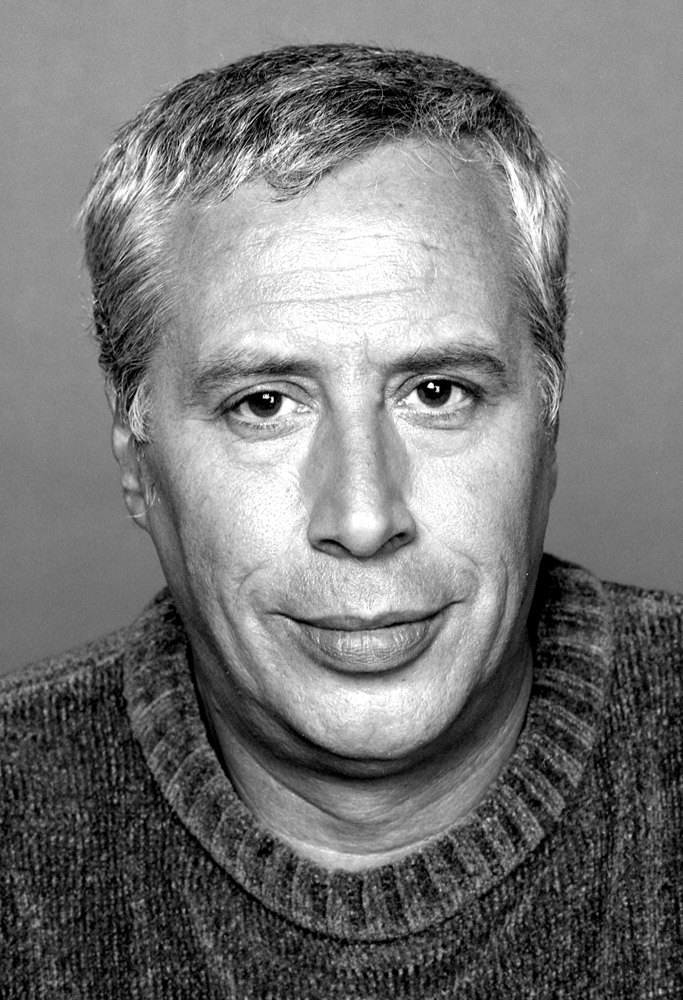
- Antonio del Real in 2007.
- Born: 1947 (age 78–79); Cazorla, Jaén, Spain
- Occupations: Director, actor, screenwriter

Antonio del Real is a Spanish film director, actor and screenwriter.

== Partial filmography ==
=== Director ===
- El río que nos lleva (1989)
- Cha-cha-chá (1998)
- Mujer de mi vida, La (2001)
- Trileros (2003)
- Desde que amanece apetece (2005)
- La Conjura de El Escorial (2008)

=== Actor ===
- The Cannibal Man (1972)
- No One Heard the Scream (1973)
- Forget the Drums (1975)
- The Legion Like Women (1976)
