= The Miracle of P. Tinto =

- Theatrical release poster
- Spanish: El milagro de P. Tinto
- Directed by: Javier Fesser
- Written by: Guillermo Fesser; Javier Fesser
- Produced by: José Luis Garci; Luis Manso
- Starring: Luis Ciges; Silvia Casanova; Pablo Pinedo; Javier Aller; Emilio Gavira; Janfri Topera
- Cinematography: Javier Aguirresarobe
- Edited by: Guillermo Represa
- Music by: Suso Sáiz
- Color process: black and white (prologue), color
- Production companies: Sogetel; Películas Pendelton
- Distributed by: Warner Sogefilms (Spain); Buena Vista Film Sales (Internationally)
- Release date: 18 December 1998
- Running time: 109 min
- Country: Spain
- Language: Spanish

The Miracle of P. Tinto (Spanish: El milagro de P. Tinto) is a 1998 Spanish surrealist comedy film directed and co-written by Javier Fesser.

== Plot ==
After a prologue (La llave) imitating an Eastern European black-and-white short film, the story is told in a retrospective way.

P. Tinto was born obsessed with building a big family and soon enlists a blind girl, Olivia, in his big life project. However, despite his best intentions, the couple is unable to have kids due to their incompetence to understand the sexual innuendo of the adults and they spent the most of their lifes trying to have kids just by pulling the suspenders in and out and singing "tralari, tralari".

After several years without having any kid, the now elder couple decide to pray for a miracle and that same night a couple of Martians ends up stranded in their door. P. Tinto, thinking they are children due to their short stature, decides to adopt them and treat them as kids, despite their protests and their adult behavior.

Some time later, while watching a video reel about a big family favoured by the government and the need to adopt African orphans, P. Tinto decides to adopt one, but his adoption form goes flying to the hands of Pancho Jose, a man that just escaped from a Polish madhouse and armed with a big butane cylinder. Along with him, a nationalist contractor called Usillos that was giving him a ride, has his car broken in front of the Tinto´s house.

Mistaken as an African orphan, Pancho is adopted by the couple, while Usillos is contracted by P. Tinto to rebuild his library to adapt it as a new room for Pancho, Usillos accepts the job after learning that an UFO machine is hidden in the house.

Pancho Jose bonds with the Martians after learning that the UFO is also a time machine and he decides to help them to fix it so he can come back in time to save his mother from being crushed by a big box of cheese and prevent a sad chain of events to happen in his life.

However, P. Tinto has another plans for Pancho when he learns the contract with the factory´s biggest client, The Vatican, is about to be cancelled, and tries to lure Panchito into the business. While Panchito tries to propose a new product (pizza) for the business, P. Tinto gets angry and locks his son in the attic, where he learns that the UFO got broken during a test run in a weird accident.

P. Tinto decides to use his son´s idea, but is quickly rejected by the priest of the town that decides to lure any of the "kids" to the church, enlisting Jose Ramon, one of the Martians, in the process. Ramon, enlightened by faith, decides to become a priest and leave behind the idea to come back to Mars.

Meanwhile, Pancho Jose seduces Olivia (that complained a lot about a pain in her low stomach) and the woman dances the next morning in a burst of happiness just to be run over by a train. Pancho Jose, frustrated over the outcome of the last events, decides to rebuild the time machine using Usillo´s truck.

Usillos, having enough information about the UFO, reports is to the NASA, but when the investigators arrive, they took Usillos instead, as they find him dressing with his UFO gadgets, his thumb incredibly swollen and completely crazy.

Pancho Jose manages to complete the machine and says goodbye to P. Tinto. He leaves with the other Martian, just to reveal that he wasn´t alone bringing with him a midget friend from the madhouse he brought in his luggage that turned also to be a Martian. They came back to time to save Pancho´s mother and reunite her with his past self. This leads to a sequence of changes in the time lapse, reverting the death of Olivia and leading an African orphan to find the house of P. Tinto that is on the roof waiting for a miracle.

In a mid-credits scene, it is revealed that the stranded Martian was found in the road and, while he insisted that he is an alien, is again mistaken as a kid and adopted by a big family along with another African orphan. At the end of the credits, we see Olivia running happily in the meadows.

== Production ==
Brothers Javier and Guillermo Fesser have "Pérez de Petinto" as their maternal surname. "Petinto" is an unusual word in Spanish and may be misunderstood as "P. Tinto" ("P. Dark/Red/Dyed").

== Release ==
The film was released domestically in Spain by Warner Sogefilms. It opened in theatres on 18 December 1998. Buena Vista Film Sales acquired international sales rights to the film.

== Cast ==
- Luis Ciges - P. Tinto
- Janusz Ziemniak - Apenao / Bartolo
- Pablo Pinedo - Joselito
- Pepe Viyuela - Manikomien Direktor
- Andrés Calamardo - P. Tinto niño
- Tomás Sáez - Padre Marciano

== See also ==
- List of Spanish films of 1998
