= Rafael Arozarena =

Spanish poet and novelist

- Born: April 4, 1923; Tenerife
- Died: September 30, 2009
- Occupation(s): Poet and novelist

Rafael Arozarena (April 4, 1923 – September 30, 2009) was a Spanish poet and novelist from the Canary Islands.

== Biography ==
Arozarena was born in Tenerife. He studied medicine and after that he started writing books, because writing was what he liked the most and what he usually did. He spent his youth under the influence of the Spanish Civil War (1936–1939) and the post-war. He joined in a literary group called 'Los Fetasianos' (Fetasiano group) with some of his friends.

His first stories appeared in the 1940s in a magazine called Arco. About ten years later, he started to write for a newspaper and all through his life he published six books: Alto crecen los cardos, Aprisa cantan los gallos, El omnibus pintado con cerezas, Silbato de tinta amarilla and Cerveza de grano rojo. However, his most important book is Mararía, which was popularly received and adapted into a film in 1998. In 1988, he received the Canary Prize for Literature, the most important literary prize in the Canary Islands alongside his longtime friend Isaac de Vega. Until his death in 2009, he lived in Bajamar, La Laguna (Tenerife).

== Legacy ==
A high school, Instituto Rafael Arozarena, was built in 2004 and named after Arozarena in La Orotava.

== Poetry ==
- Romancero Canario (1946)
- A la Sombra de los Cuervos (1947)
- Aprisa Cantan los Gallos (1964)
- El omnibús Pintado con Cerezas (1971)
- Desfile Otoñal de los Obispos Licenciosos(1985)
- Altos Crecen los Cardos (1959)
- Silbato de Tinta Amarilla (1977)
- Amor de la Mora (1989)

== Novels ==
- Mararía (1973)
- Cerveza de grano rojo (1984)

== Children's novels ==
- La Garza y la Violeta (1998)
- El Dueño del Arco-Iris (2002)
