= Cayetana Guillén Cuervo =

Spanish actress, journalist and TV presenter

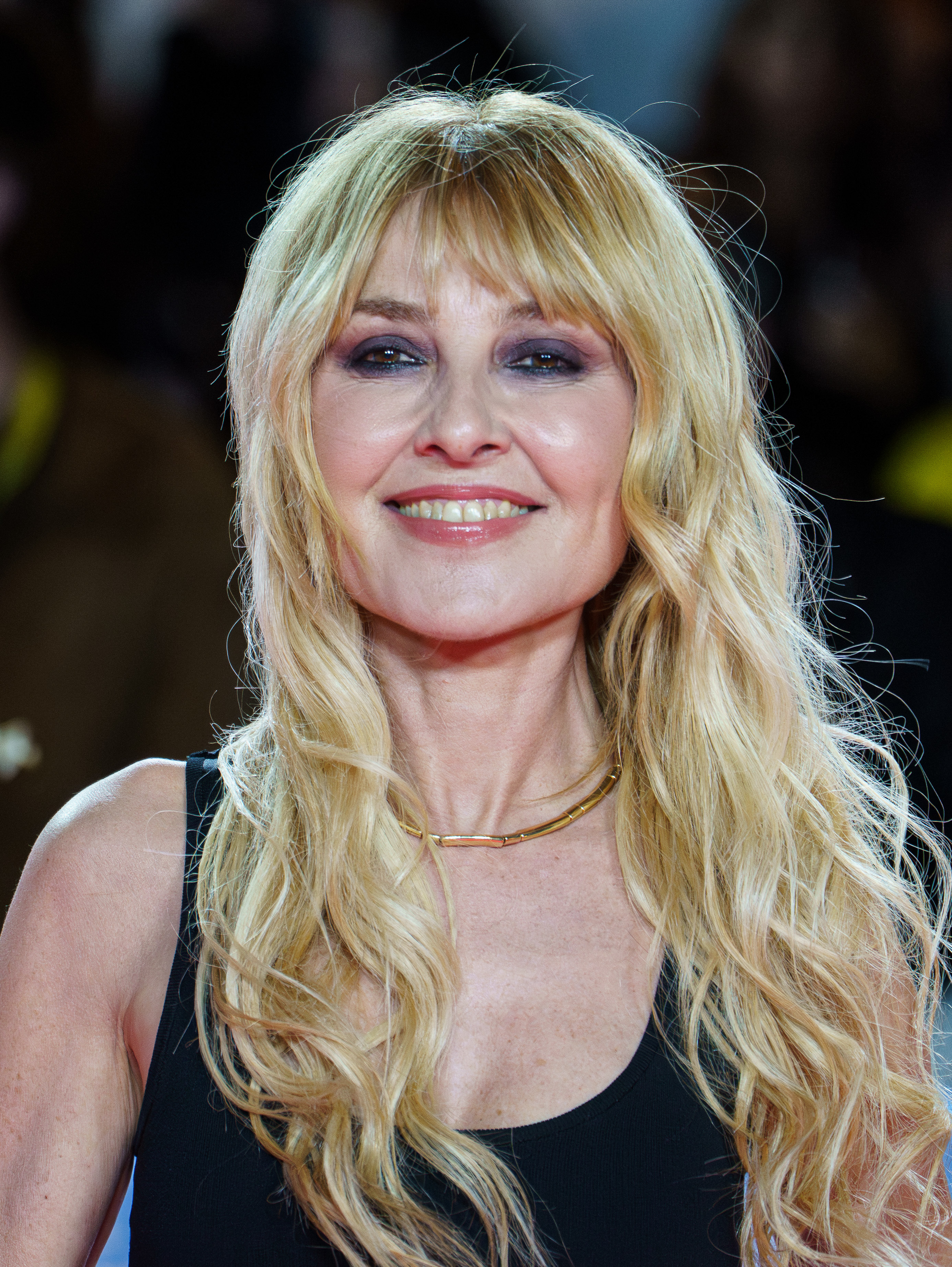
- Guillén Cuervo in 2025
- Born: Cayetana Guillén Cuervo; 13 June 1969 (age 57); Madrid, Spain
- Education: Complutense University of Madrid
- Occupation: Actress
- Years active: 1986-present
- Spouse: Omar Ayyashi Ramino (m. 2005)
- Children: 1
- Parents: Fernando Guillén (father); Gemma Cuervo (mother)
- Relatives: Fernando Guillén Cuervo (brother)

Cayetana Guillén Cuervo (born 13 June 1969) is a Spanish screen and stage actress, journalist and television presenter.

== Early life and background ==
Born on 13 June 1969 in Madrid, both of her parents, Fernando Guillén and Gemma Cuervo as well as her brother, Fernando are also actors. She studied Communication Sciences at the Complutense University of Madrid and, since 1998, she has been the presenter of a weekly program on Televisión Española, Versión española, where a Spanish-language movie is shown and discussed.

== Professional career ==
Cayetana began her acting career at the end of the 1980s, first in television and in theatre soon after. She debuted in 1986 with a small role in the television series Segunda enseñanza, written by Ana Diosdado and directed by Pedro Masó.

In 1987, she played a small role in the theatre production Coqueluche by Roberto Romero. During the following years, Cayetana dedicated herself to theatre but with occasional appearances in television programmes as well as series from the 1990s onwards. Her first appearance on the big screen was in 1989 in La luna negra, directed by Imanol Uribe.

At the beginning of the 1990s, she starred in four different theatre plays: Entre bobos anda el juego (1991) and Thriller imposible (1992) were both produced by the theatre company Strion; later on she would also appear in La gran sultana (1993) and Fuenteovejuna (1993), produced by the Compañía Nacional de Teatro Clásico.

Her appearances in theatre lessened in the second half of the 1990s, and she devoted herself to the film industry. In this successful period, Cayetana worked on the well-known films All About My Mother, The Wound of Light and The Grandfather where she worked with her father. Thanks to her role in The Grandfather, which was nominated for the Academy Award, she was nominated for the Spanish Goya Award for Best Actress.

She made her debut as a TV presenter in 1998 in the national television channel Televisión Española. She also works as a presenter in culture programmes on this channel, or more specifically, Seventh-Art programmes like Versión Española, running from 1998, where she interviewed the members of the technical and artistic team of a film that had been displayed before.

In the 2000s and 2010s, she works both as a TV presenter and actress (film industry and theatre), as well as a journalist in the Spanish newspaper El Mundo.

From 2015 to 2020, she played the main role of Irene Larra in the successful television series El Ministerio del Tiempo.

In 2016, she participated in the worldwide known show MasterChef Celebrity, in the first edition. Miguel Ángel Muñoz was the winner and Guillén Cuervo the runner-up.

In 2018, she participated in Cero en Historia, TV show hosted by Joaquín Reyes.

The general assembly of the Academy of Performing Arts of Spain (AAEE) elected her as the new president of the organization in January 2022.

== Filmography ==
=== Film ===
Year	Title	Role	Notes	Ref.
1992	Un paraguas para tres	Dependienta ('sales clerk')		
1992	Amo tu cama rica	Lola		
1992	La marrana (The Sow)	Putilla ('whore')		
1995	Los hombres siempre mienten	Cristina		
1995	Historias del Kronen (Stories from the Kronen)	Hermana de Carlos ('Carlos' sister')		
1996	Corsarios del chip	Vicky		
1996	Más que amor, frenesí (Not Love, Just Frenzy)	Mónica		
1997	La herida luminosa (The Wound of Light)	Sor María		
1997	Atómica	Victoria		
1997	Hazlo por mí (Do It for Me)	Isabel Velasco		
1998	El abuelo (The Grandfather)	Doña Lucrecia Richmond		
1999	Sí, quiero...	Candela		
2004	La mirada violeta (The Violet Look)	Violeta		
2004	Amor idiota	Sandra		
2004	Las huellas que devuelve el mar	Laura		
2012	Una pistola en cada mano (A Gun in Each Hand)	Sara		
2020	La maldición del guapo	Catalina		

=== Television ===
Year	Series	Role
1986	Segunda enseñanza	Brigitte
1994	Historias de la puta mili	
1994–1995	Colegio mayor	
1996	Yo, una mujer	Paula
1998–present	Versión española	Presenter
2000	Raquel busca su sitio	Quela
2004	18th Goya Awards	Host (with Diego Luna)
2005	Lobos	Carmen Lobo
2007	D-calle	Presenter
2008-2011	Días de cine	Presenter
2009-2010	Amar en tiempos revueltos	Estela del Val
2013–present	¡Atención obras!	Presenter
2015–2020	El Ministerio del Tiempo	Irene Larra
2016	Masterchef Celebrity	Contestant Runner-up
2018	Cero en Historia	
2026	Mask Singer: Adivina quién canta	Contestant as Carnivorous Plant

=== Stage ===
Year	Play	Role
1987	Coqueluche	Girl
1993	Fuenteovejuna	Pascuala
1993	La gran sultana	Woman
2013	Fuegos	Marguerite Yourcenar
2013-2014	The Misunderstanding	Marta
2015	Hedda Gabler	Hedda Gabler

== Awards ==
Year	Award	Category	Work	Result	Ref.
1997	Mostra de València	Best Actress	Do It for Me	Won	
1999	54th CEC Awards	Best Actress	The Grandfather	Won	
1999	13th Goya Awards	Best Actress	The Grandfather	Nominated	
2017	4th Feroz Awards	Best Supporting Actress in a Series	El ministerio del tiempo	Nominated	
2018	5th Feroz Awards	Best Supporting Actress in a Series	El ministerio del tiempo	Nominated	
