= The Stolen Years (1998 film) =

1998 film

- Theatrical release poster
- Spanish: Los años bárbaros
- Directed by: Fernando Colomo
- Starring: Jordi Mollà; Ernesto Alterio; Hedy Burress; Allison Smith; Juan Echanove
- Distributed by: Warner Sogefilms
- Release date: 11 September 1998
- Running time: 2 h
- Country: Spain
- Languages: Spanish; English

The Stolen Years (Spanish: Los años bárbaros) is a 1998 Spanish drama film directed by Fernando Colomo.

== Plot ==
Set in Spain during the Francoist period, the film follows Tomás (Jordi Mollà) and Jaime (Ernesto Alterio), two students opposed to the regime who are sent to a forced labour camp at the Valley of Cuelgamuros after making anti-government graffiti at the Complutense University of Madrid. With the help of a plan organized from Paris and two young Americans, Kathy (Hedy Burress) and Susan (Allison Smith (actress)), they escape in a red convertible while being pursued by Falangist leader Víctor Marquina (Juan Echanove). After a series of setbacks, they eventually reach Paris.

Several scenes were filmed in the building that at the time housed the Parador de Turismo in Medinaceli, noted for its architectural significance.

== Cast ==
- Jordi Mollà as Tomás
- Ernesto Alterio as Jaime
- Hedy Burress as Kathy
- Allison Smith as Susan
- Juan Echanove as Víctor Marquina
- Josep Maria Pou as Michel
- Álex Angulo as Máximo
- Pepón Nieto as Velasco

== See also ==
- List of Spanish films of 1998
