= Ana Diosdado =

Spanish-Argentine actress and playwright

The Most Excellent Ana Diosdado OAXS
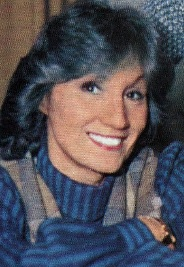
- Born: Ana Isabel Álvarez-Diosdado Gisbert; 21 May 1938; Buenos Aires, Argentina
- Died: 5 October 2015 (aged 77); Madrid, Spain

Ana Isabel Álvarez-Diosdado Gisbert OAXS (21 May 1938 – 5 October 2015) better known as Ana Diosdado was a dual Argentine-Spanish actress, playwright, theater director, and writer. Her acting credits include the television series, Las llaves de la independencia. Diosdado's work as a playwright includes Forget the Drums, which debuted in Zamora, Spain, on 28 June 1970.

Diosdado was born on 21 May 1938 in Buenos Aires, Argentina, to Spanish parents, Enrique Diosdado, an actor, and Isabel Gisbert, who had fled the Spanish Civil War.

Ana Diosdado died from complications of cardiorespiratory failure during a meeting at the Sociedad General de Autores in Madrid, Spain, on 5 October 2015, at the age of 77.

== Filmography ==
=== Writer ===
Year	Name of the film	Kind of	Episodes	Notice
1969	Algo amargo en la boca			dialogue collaboration - uncredited
1975	Juan y Manuela	TV series	12	1 episode as writer
1975	Olvida los tambores			play/screenplay
1975/1978	Estudio 1	TV series		writer - 1 episode, 1978) (play: adaptation - 1 episode, 1975) (play - 1 episode)
1983	Anillos de oro	TV-Series	13 episodes	
1986	Segunda enseñanza	TV-Series	13 episodes	
1989	Los ochenta son nuestros	TV-Movie		play
1964	Función de tarde	TV-Series	1	adaptation
1995	Función de noche	TV-Serie	1	play
2005	Las llaves de la independencia			novel/screenplay

=== Actress ===
- 1974: Juan y Manuela (TV Series, 13 episodes)
- 1983: Anillos de oro (TV Series, 13 episodes,)
- 1986: Segunda enseñanza (TV Series 1986), 13 episodes)
- 2008: El libro de las aguas

=== Director ===
- 1995: Función de noche (TV Series, 1 episode)

== Honours ==
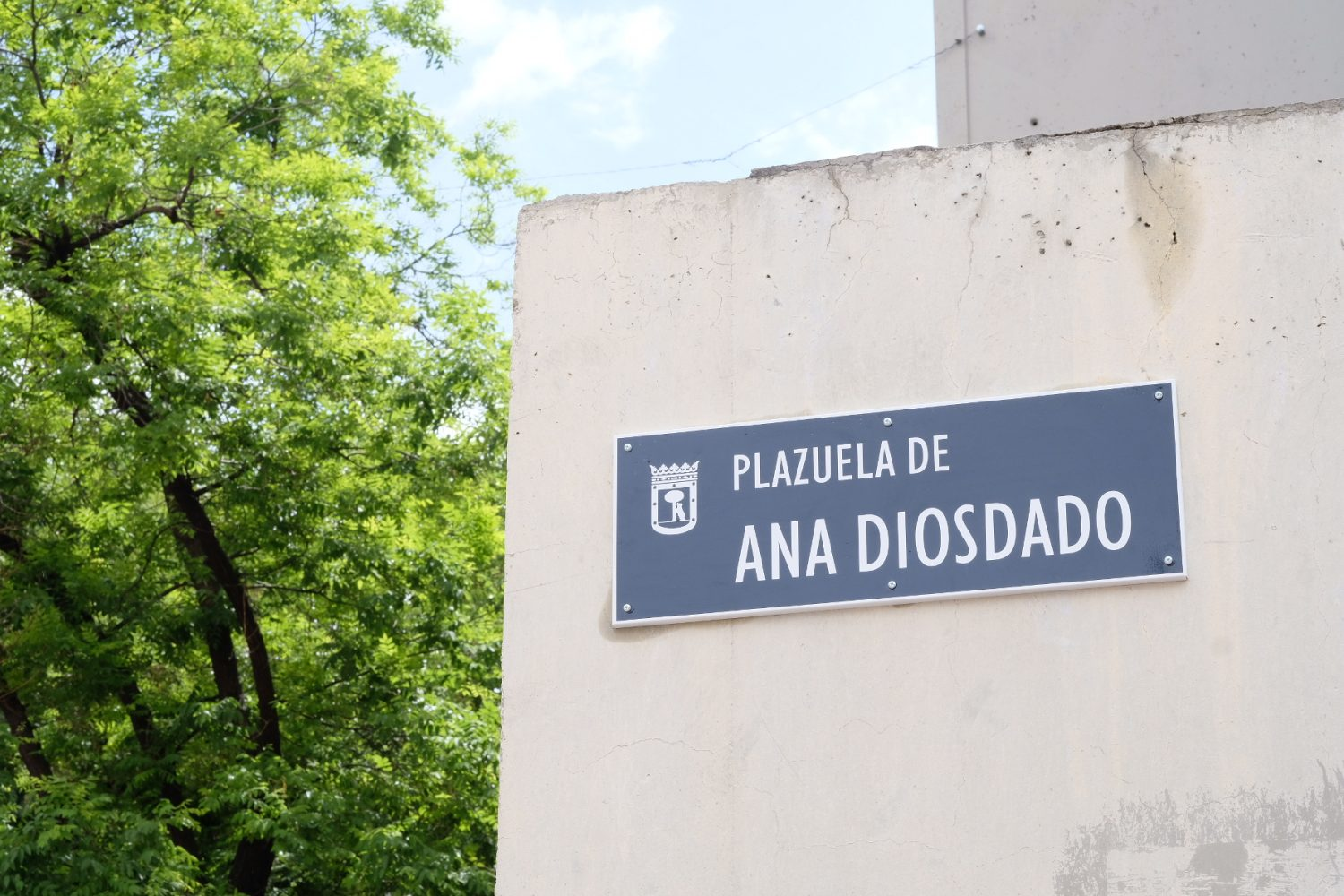
Ana Diosdado Square in Madrid.

- Dame Grand Cross of the Civil Order of Alfonso X, the Wise (Posthumous, Kingdom of Spain, 9 October 2015).
