= Gabino Diego =

Spanish actor (born 1966)

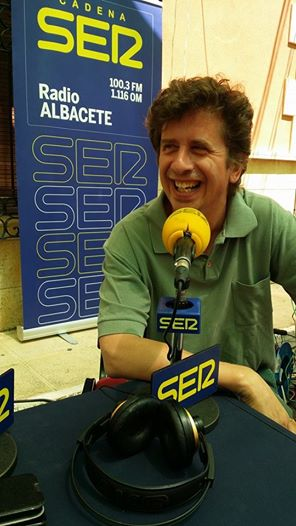
- Gabino Diego in 2014
- Born: Gabino Diego Solís; 18 September 1966 (age 59); Madrid, Spain
- Occupation: Actor

Gabino Diego Solís (born 18 September 1966) is a Spanish actor. He was a regular face in 1990s Spanish cinema, featuring in titles such as ¡Ay, Carmela! (1990), The Dumbfounded King (1991), Belle époque (1992), The Worst Years of Our Lives (1994), and A Time for Defiance (1998). In his prime, he was the recipient of several accolades including one Goya Award for Best Supporting Actor and 4 subsequent Goya Award nominations. His big screen career substantially faded in the 2000s.

== Biography ==
Gabino Diego Solís was born on 18 September 1966 in Madrid. He studied at Runnymede College. He made his feature film debut as an actor in Bicycles Are for the Summer.

== Filmography ==
=== Film ===
Year	Title	Role	Notes	Ref.
1984	Las bicicletas son para el verano (Bicycles Are for the Summer)	Luisito	Feature film debut	
1989	Ovejas negras	Emilio		
1990	¡Ay, Carmela!	Gustavete		
1991	La noche más larga (The Longest Night)	Fito		
1991	Fuera de juego	Tony		
1991	La viuda del capitán Estrada	Tomás		
1991	El rey pasmado (The Dumbfounded King)	Rey		
1992	Belle époque	Juanito		
1993	Tierno verano de lujurias y azoteas	Pablo		
1993	Supernova	Saturnino		
1994	Los peores años de nuestra vida (The Worst Years of Our Lives)	Alberto		
1995	Así en el cielo como en la tierra	San Juan		
1995	Los hombres siempre mienten	Martín		
1995	Two Much	Manny		
1997	El amor perjudica seriamente la salud (Love Can Seriously Damage Your Health)	Santi joven		
1998	Cha-cha-chá	Gustavo		
1998	La hora de los valientes (A Time for Defiance)	Manuel		
2001	Torrente 2: misión en Marbella (Torrente 2: Mission in Marbella)	Cuco		
2001	Pata negra	José		
2016	Nuestros amantes (Our Lovers)	Jorge		

== Awards ==
Year	Award	Category	Work	Result	Ref.
1990	3rd European Film Awards	Best Supporting Actor	¡Ay, Carmela!	Nominated	
1991	5th Goya Awards	Best Supporting Actor	¡Ay, Carmela!	Won	
1992	6th Goya Awards	Best Actor	The Dumbfounded King	Nominated	
1993	7th Goya Awards	Best Supporting Actor	Belle époque	Nominated	
1995	9th Goya Awards	Best Actor	The Worst Years of Our Lives	Nominated	
1999	13th Goya Awards	Best Actor	A Time for Defiance	Nominated	
