= List of Spanish films of 2007 =

A list of Spanish-produced and co-produced feature films released in Spain in 2007. When applicable, the domestic theatrical release date is favoured.

== Films ==
Release		Title (Domestic title)	Cast & Crew	Ref.
J A N U A R Y	12	The Kovak Box (La caja Kovak)	Director: Daniel Monzón Cast: Timothy Hutton, Lucía Jiménez, David Kelly, Gary Piquer, Georgia MacKenzie	
J A N U A R Y	12	Women in the Park (Mujeres en el parque)	Director: Felipe Vega Cast: Adolfo Fernández, Blanca Apilánez, Bárbara Lennie, Emma Vilarasau, Alberto Ferreiro	
J A N U A R Y	19	Ekipo Ja	Director: Juan A. Muñoz Pérez Cast: Juan A. Muñoz Pérez, Pepe Carabias, Juan Salazar, Arévalo, José Luis Cortés, José Salazar, Patricia Rivas, Blanca Jara, José Antonio Sacristán Lázaro, Silvia Gambino	
J A N U A R Y	19	Celia's Lives (Las vidas de Celia)	Director: Antonio Chavarrías Cast: Najwa Nimri, Luis Tosar, Daniel Giménez Cacho, Aida Folch, Àlex Casanovas, Mentxu Romero	
J A N U A R Y	26	Fuerte Apache	Director: Mateu Adrover Cast: Juan Diego, Lolita	
F E B R U A R Y	2	Miguel y William	Director: Inés París Cast: Elena Anaya, Juan Luis Galiardo, Will Kemp, Malena Alterio, Miriam Giovanelli, Josep Maria Pou, Geraldine Chaplin, Jorge Calvo, Carolina Lapausa	
F E B R U A R Y	9	Cinema Days (Días de cine)	Director: David Serrano Cast: Alberto San Juan, Nathalie Poza, Miguel Rellán, Javier Gutiérrez, Andrés Lima, Luis Bermejo, Fernando Tejero	
M A R C H	9	Theresa: The Body of Christ (Teresa, el cuerpo de Cristo)	Director: Ray Loriga Cast: Paz Vega, Leonor Watling, Geraldine Chaplin, Eusebio Poncela, Amparo Valle, José Luis Gómez	
M A R C H	16	The Contestant (Concursante)	Director: Rodrigo Cortés Cast: Leonardo Sbaraglia, Chete Lera, Miryam Gallego, Fernando Cayo, Myriam de Maeztu, Luis Zahera	
M A R C H	16	Lola, the Movie (Lola, la película)	Director: Miguel Hermoso Cast: Gala Évora, José Luis García Pérez, Carlos Hipólito, Alfonso Begara	
A P R I L	13	Modesty (Pudor)	Director: David Ulloa, Tristán Ulloa Cast: Nancho Novo, Elvira Mínguez, Celso Bugallo, Natalia Rodríguez	
A P R I L	13	The Heart of the Earth (El corazón de la tierra)	Director: Antonio Cuadri Cast: Catalina Sandino Moreno, Sienna Guillory, Philip Winchester, Bernard Hill, Joaquim de Almeida, Jorge Perugorría, Ana Fernández	
A P R I L	27	Always Yours (Tuya siempre)	Director: Manuel Lombardero Cast: Flora Martínez, Rubén Ochandiano, José Coronado, Caroline Henderson	
A P R I L	27	The Abandoned (Los abandonados)	Director: Nacho Cerdà Cast: Anastasia Hille, Karel Roden, Valentin Ganev	
J U N E	1	Solitary Fragments (La soledad)	Director: Jaime Rosales Cast: Sonia Almarcha, José Luis Torrijo, Juan Margallo, Miriam Correa, Jorge Bosch, Petra Martínez	
J U N E	1	The Wooden Box (La caja)	Director: Juan Carlos Falcón Cast: Ángela Molina, Elvira Mínguez, Antonia San Juan, Vladimir Cruz, María Galiana	
J U N E	15	Under the Stars (Bajo las estrellas)	Director: Félix Viscarret Cast: Alberto San Juan, Emma Suárez, Julián Villagrán, Violeta Rodríguez	
J U N E	22	Thieves (Ladrones)	Director: Jaime Marqués Olarreaga Cast: Juan José Ballesta, María Valverde	
J U N E	29	Love Expresso (Café solo... o con ellas)	Director: Álvaro Díaz Lorenzo Cast: Alejo Sauras, Lucía Jiménez, Asier Etxeandía, Elena Ballesteros, Terele Pávez	
J U L Y	6	Boystown (Chuecatown)	Director: Juan Flahn Cast: Pepón Nieto, Pablo Puyol, Concha Velasco, Rosa María Sardá, Carlos Fuentes, Edu Soto	
J U L Y	20	Atasco en la nacional	Director: Josetxo San Mateo Cast: Pablo Carbonell, Anabel Alonso, Ana María Ruiz Polvorosa, Luisber Santiago, Roberto San Martín, Bárbara de Lema, Malena Gracia	
A U G U S T	24	Chaotic Ana (Caótica Ana)	Director: Julio Medem Cast: Manuela Vellés, Charlotte Rampling, Bebe, Nicolas Cazalé, Asier Newman	
A U G U S T	24	El club de los suicidas	Director: Roberto Santiago Cast: Fernando Tejero, Lucía Jiménez, Luis Callejo, Juanma Cifuentes, Cristina Alcázar, Clara Lago, Joan Dalmau	
A U G U S T	31	The Nautical Chart (La carta esférica)	Director: Imanol Uribe Cast: Carmelo Gómez, Aitana Sánchez-Gijón, Enrico Lo Verso, Gonzalo Cunill, Carlos Kaniowsky, Javier García Gallego	
S E P T E M B E R	7	Touch the Sky (Tocar el cielo)	Director: Marcos Carnevale Cast: Chete Lera, Betiana Blum, Raúl Arévalo, Verónica Echegui, Facundo Arana	
S E P T E M B E R	14	In the City of Sylvia (En la ciudad de Sylvia)	Director: José Luis Guerín Cast: Pilar López de Ayala, Xavier Lafitte	
S E P T E M B E R	21	¿Y tú quién eres?	Director: Antonio Mercero Cast: Manuel Alexandre, Cristina Brondo, José Luis López Vázquez	
S E P T E M B E R	21	Blinkers (Salir pitando)	Director: Álvaro Fernández Armero Cast: Guillermo Toledo, Javier Gutiérrez, Antonio de la Torre, Nathalie Poza, Ales Furundarena, Chiqui Fernández	
S E P T E M B E R	28	Mataharis	Director: Icíar Bollaín Cast: Najwa Nimri, Tristán Ulloa, Nuria González, María Vázquez	
O C T O B E R	5	Seven Billiard Tables (Siete mesas de billar francés)	Director: Gracia Querejeta Cast: Maribel Verdú, Blanca Portillo, Raúl Arévalo	
O C T O B E R	11	The Orphanage (El orfanato)	Director: Juan Antonio Bayona Cast: Belén Rueda, Fernando Cayo, Geraldine Chaplin, Roger Príncep	
O C T O B E R	19	13 Roses (Las trece rosas)	Director: Emilio Martínez Lázaro Cast: Marta Etura, Pilar López de Ayala, Verónica Sánchez, Miren Ibarguren, Fran Perea, Enrico Lo Verso, Goya Toledo, Gabriella Pession, Félix Gómez, Nadia de Santiago, Luisa Martín, Bárbara Lennie, Asier Etxeandía, Teresa Hurtado de Ory, María Isasi	
O C T O B E R	19	Quiéreme	Director: Beda Docampo Feijóo Cast: Darío Grandinetti, Ariadna Gil, Kira Miró, Cristina Valdivieso, Agustina Lecuona, Luis Brandoni, Jorge Marrale, Carlos Hipólito, Juan Echanove	
O C T O B E R	19	Querida Bamako	Director: Omer Oke, Txarli Llorente Cast: Djédjé Apali, Esther Vallés, Gorsy Edu	
O C T O B E R	26	53 Winter Days (53 días de invierno)	Director: Judith Colell Cast: Mercedes Sampietro, Àlex Brendemühl, Aina Clotet, Sílvia Munt, Joaquim de Almeida	
O C T O B E R	31	Oviedo Express	Director: Gonzalo Suárez Cast: Carmelo Gómez, Aitana Sánchez-Gijón, Maribel Verdú, Najwa Nimri, Jorge Sanz, Bárbara Goenaga, Alberto Jiménez	
O C T O B E R	31	Los Totenwackers	Director: Ibon Cormenzana Cast: Natalia Sánchez, Jasper Harris, Geraldine Chaplin, Celso Bugallo,	
N O V E M B E R	9	Suso's Tower (La torre de Suso)	Director: Tom Fernández Cast: Javier Cámara, Gonzalo de Castro, César Vea, José Luis Alcobendas, Malena Alterio, Mariana Cordero	
N O V E M B E R	9	The Sandman (El hombre de arena)	Director: José Manuel González Cast: Hugo Silva, María Valverde, Irene Visedo, Samuel Le Bihan, Alberto Jiménez	
N O V E M B E R	16	Sunday Light (Luz de domingo)	Director: José Luis Garci Cast: Álex González, Paula Echevarría, Alfredo Landa, Kiti Mánver	
N O V E M B E R	16	Fermat's Room (La habitación de Fermat)	Director: Luis Piedrahita, Rodrigo Sopeña Cast: Alejo Sauras, Elena Ballesteros, Lluís Homar, Santi Millán, Federico Luppi, Helena Carrión	
N O V E M B E R	23	Escuchando a Gabriel	Director: José Enrique March Cast: Javier Ríos, Antonio Dechent, Silvia Abascal	
N O V E M B E R	23	Guantanamero (Arritmia)	Director: Vicente Peñarrocha Cast: Natalia Verbeke, Rupert Evans, Derek Jacobi	
N O V E M B E R	26	REC	Director: Paco Plaza, Jaume Balagueró Cast: Manuela Velasco, Ferrán Terraza, Jorge Serrano, Pablo Rosso	
N O V E M B E R	30	Lolita's Club (Canciones de amor en Lolita's Club)	Director: Vicente Aranda Cast: Eduardo Noriega, Flora Martínez, Belén Fabra	
D E C E M B E R	21	Ángeles S.A.	Director: Eduard Bosch Cast: María Isabel, Pablo Carbonell, Anabel Alonso, Silvia Marsó	

== Box office ==
The ten highest-grossing Spanish films in 2007, by domestic box office gross revenue, are as follows:

Highest-grossing films of 2007
Rank	Title	Distributors	Admissions	Domestic gross (€)
1	The Orphanage (El orfanato)	Warner Bros. Pictures	4,274,355	24,317,951.82
2	REC	Filmax	1,341,951	7,748,900.61
3	13 Roses (Las trece rosas)	Alta Classics	786,438	4,321,579.77
4	Love Expresso (Café solo... o con ellas)	Buena Vista International	450,400	2,437,791.96
5	The Hairy Tooth Fairy (Pérez, el ratoncito de tus sueños) ‡	Barton Films	423,514	2,182,273.79
6	The Nautical Chart (La carta esférica)	Universal Pictures	377,651	2,114,819.99
7	Ekipo Ja	DeAPlaneta	303,508	1,629,034.84
8	The Kovak Box (La caja Kovak)	Filmax	295,013	1,596,899.74
9	Pan's Labyrinth (El laberinto del fauno) ‡	Warner Bros. Pictures	302,792	1,594,031.98
10	Suso's Tower (La torre de Suso)	Warner Bros. Pictures	266,678	1,527,865.12
‡: 2006 theatrical opening

== See also ==
- 22nd Goya Awards
- Djiarama, 2007 documentary film
