= 17th Actors and Actresses Union Awards =

2008 Spanish award ceremony

- Date: 31 March 2008
- Site: Palacio de Congresos, Madrid, Spain
- Organized by: Actors and Actresses Union

Highlights
- Honorary career award: Paco Merino

The 17th Actors and Actresses Union Awards ceremony was held on 31 March 2008 at the Palacio de Congresos in Madrid.

In addition to the competitive awards, the San Carlos Borromeo parish priest Enrique de Castro received the 'Mujeres en Unión' award whereas Paco Merino the 'Toda una vida' career award. The Special Award went to the Centro de Documentación Teatral. Javier Bardem also was recognised by his peers for his recently won Academy Award, the first ever by a Spanish actor.

== Winners and nominees ==
The winners and nominees are listed as follows:

=== Film ===
Best Male Performance in a Leading Role: Alfredo Landa — Sunday Light; Javier Cámara — Suso's Tower; Alberto San Juan — Under the Stars	Best Female Performance in a Leading Role: Petra Martínez — Solitary Fragments; Belén Rueda — The Orphanage; Maribel Verdú — Seven Billiard Tables
Best Male Performance in a Secondary Role: Raúl Arévalo — Seven Billiard Tables; Vladimir Cruz — The Wooden Box; Jorge Sanz — Oviedo Express	Best Female Performance in a Secondary Role: Nuria González — Mataharis; Mariana Cordero — Suso's Tower; Marta Etura — 13 Roses
Best Male Performance in a Minor Role: José Manuel Cervino — 13 Roses; Antonio de la Torre — Mataharis; Enrique Villén — Sunday Light	Best Female Performance in a Minor Role: Geraldine Chaplin — The Orphanage; Nadia de Santiago — 13 Roses; María Isasi — 13 Roses

=== Television ===
Best Male Performance in a Leading Role: Carlos Hipólito — Desaparecida; Miguel Ángel Solá — Desaparecida; Diego Martín — Hermanos y detectives	Best Female Performance in a Leading Role: Luisa Martín — Desaparecida; Ruth Núñez — Yo soy Bea; Concha Velasco — Herederos
Best Male Performance in a Secondary Role: Ginés García Millán — Herederos; Félix Gómez — Herederos; Carlos Kaniowsky — Desaparecida	Best Female Performance in a Secondary Role: Petra Martínez — Herederos; Marta Calvó — Amar en tiempos revueltos; Belén López — RIS
Best Male Performance in a Minor Role: José L. Alcobendas — Amar en tiempos revueltos; Jacobo Dicenta — Desaparecida; Iker Lastra — Herederos	Best Female Performance in a Minor Role: Ana Villa — Amar en tiempos revueltos; Luisa Martínez — Desaparecida; Saturna Barrio — Amar en tiempos revueltos

=== Theatre ===
Best Male Performance in a Leading Role: José María Pou — La cabra; José Pedro Carrión — Cyrano de Bergerac; Asier Etxeandia — Barroco	Best Female Performance in a Leading Role: Vicky Peña — Homebody Kabul; Ana Belén — Phaedra; Blanca Portillo — Barroco
Best Male Performance in a Secondary Role: Rafa Castejón — Los persas; Paco Casares — Salir del armario; Walter Vidarte — Un enemigo del pueblo	Best Female Performance in a Secondary Role: Alicia Hermida — Phaedra; Nathalie Poza — Marat Sade; Susi Sánchez — Mujeres soñaron caballos
Best Male Performance in a Minor Role: Alfonso Blanco — Marat Sade; Pablo Huetos — Don Juan (de Goldoni); Pablo Isasi — Las Brujas de Salem	Best Female Performance in a Minor Role: Mónica Cano — The House of Bernarda Alba; Carmen Arévalo — Hay que purgar a Totó; Gemma Solé — Don Juan (de Goldoni)

=== Newcomers ===
Best New Actor: Carlos Bardem — La zona; Eduardo Casanova — El principito; Julián Villagrán — Under the Stars	Best New Actress: Sonia Almarcha — Solitary Fragments; Norma Ruiz — Yo soy Bea; Manuela Velasco — REC
