= 22nd Goya Awards =

- Date: 3 February 2008
- Site: Palacio Municipal de Congresos de Madrid
- Hosted by: José Corbacho
- Organized by: Academy of Cinematographic Arts and Sciences of Spain

Highlights
- Best Film: Solitary Fragments
- Best Actor: Alberto San Juan; Under the Stars
- Best Actress: Maribel Verdú; Seven Billiard Tables
- Most awards: The Orphanage (7)
- Most nominations: The Orphanage and 13 Roses (14)

Television coverage
- Network: La 1
- Viewership: 2.78 million (18.1%)

The 22nd Goya Awards ceremony, presented by the Academy of Cinematographic Arts and Sciences of Spain, took place at the Palacio de Congresos in Madrid on 3 February 2008. The gala was hosted by José Corbacho.

Solitary Fragments by Jaime Rosales won the Goya for Best Picture and Best Director. The Orphanage won seven awards and 13 Roses four, both out of 14 nominations.

== Background ==
The nominations were read by Juan Diego Botto and Ivana Baquero on 17 December 2007.

The linear television broadcast on La 1 drew 2,775,000 viewers (18.1% audience share).

== Winners and nominees ==
The winners and nominees are listed as follows:

Best Film: Solitary Fragments; 13 Roses; The Orphanage; Seven Billiard Tables	Best Director: Jaime Rosales – Solitary Fragments; Icíar Bollaín – Mataharis; Emilio Martínez Lázaro – 13 Roses; Gracia Querejeta – Seven Billiard Tables
Best Actor: Alberto San Juan – Under the Stars; Alfredo Landa – Sunday Light; Álvaro de Luna – The Field of Stars; Tristán Ulloa – Mataharis	Best Actress: Maribel Verdú – Seven Billiard Tables; Blanca Portillo – Seven Billiard Tables; Belén Rueda – The Orphanage; Emma Suárez – Under the Stars
Best Supporting Actor: José Manuel Cervino – 13 Roses; Raúl Arévalo – Seven Billiard Tables; Emilio Gutiérrez Caba – Suso's Tower; Carlos Larrañaga – Sunday Light; Julián Villagrán – Under the Stars	Best Supporting Actress: Amparo Baró – Seven Billiard Tables; Geraldine Chaplin – The Orphanage; Nuria González – Mataharis; María Vázquez – Mataharis
Best Original Screenplay: Sergio G. Sánchez – The Orphanage; Ignacio Martínez de Pisón – 13 Roses; Icíar Bollaín, Tatiana Rodríguez – Mataharis; Gonzalo Suárez – Oviedo Express; Gracia Querejeta, David Planell – Seven Billiard Tables	Best Adapted Screenplay: Félix Viscarret – Under the Stars; Ventura Pons – Barcelona (un mapa); Imanol Uribe – The Nautical Chart; Tristán Ulloa – Modesty; Laura Santullo – The Zone
Best New Actor: José Luis Torrijo – Solitary Fragments; Óscar Abad – The Field of Stars; Gonzalo de Castro – Suso's Tower; Roger Príncep – The Orphanage	Best New Actress: Manuela Velasco – Rec; Gala Évora – Lola, the Movie; Bárbara Goenaga – Oviedo Express; Nadia de Santiago – 13 Roses
Best New Director: Juan Antonio Bayona – The Orphanage; Félix Viscarret – Under the Stars; Tom Fernández – Suso's Tower; David Ulloa, Tristán Ulloa – Modesty	Best Documentary Film: Invisibles; Fados; Lucio; El productor
Best Cinematography: José Luis Alcaine – 13 Roses; Álvaro Gutiérrez – Under the Stars; Ángel Iguácel – Seven Billiard Tables; Carlos Suárez – Oviedo Express	Best Editing: David Gallart – Rec; Fernando Pardo – 13 Roses; Elena Ruiz – The Orphanage; Nacho Ruiz Capillas – Seven Billiard Tables
Best Art Direction: Josep Rosell – The Orphanage; Wolfgang Burmann – Oviedo Express; Edoy Hidalgo – 13 Roses; Gil Parrondo – Sunday Light	Best Production Supervision: Sandra Hermida – The Orphanage; Juan Carmona, Salvador Gómez – Sunday Light; Martín Cabañas – 13 Roses; Teresa Cepeda – Oviedo Express
Best Sound: Xavi Mas, Marc Orts, Oriol Tarragó – The Orphanage; Carlos Bonmatí, Alfonso Pino, Carlos Faruolo –13 Roses; Licio Marcos de Oliveira, David Calleja, Carlos Fesser – Always Yours; Iván Marín, José Antonio Bermúdez, Leopoldo Aledo – Seven Billiard Tables	Best Special Effects: David Martí, Montse Ribé, Pau Costa, Enric Masip, Lluís Castells, Jordi San Agustín – The Orphanage; Reyes Abades, Álex G. Ortoll – The Heart of the Earth; David Ambid, Enric Masip, Àlex Villagrasa – Rec; Pau Costa, Raúl Romanillos, Carlos Lozano – 13 Roses
Best Costume Design: Lena Mossum – 13 Roses; Sonia Grande – Lola, the Movie; Lourdes de Orduña – Sunday Light; María Reyes – The Orphanage	Best Makeup and Hairstyles: Lola López, Itziar Arrieta – The Orphanage; Lourdes Briones, Fermín Galán – Oviedo Express; Mariló Osuna, Almudena Fonseca, José Juez – 13 Roses; José Quetglas, Blanca Sánchez – The Heart of the Earth
Best Original Score: Roque Baños – 13 Roses; Carles Cases – Oviedo Express; Mikel Salas – Under the Stars; Fernando Velázquez – The Orphanage	Best Original Song: Fernando Pinto do Amaral, Carlos do Carmo for "Fado da saudade" – Fados; Víctor Reyes, Rodrigo Cortés for "Circus Honey Blues" – The Contestant; David Broza, Jorge Drexler for "La vida secreta de las pequeñas cosas" – Cándida; Daniel Melingo for "Pequeño paria" – The Mud Boy
Best Spanish Language Foreign Film: XXY · Argentina; The Silly Age · Cuba; Black Butterfly · Peru; Padre nuestro · Chile	Best Animated Film: Nocturna; Azur & Asmar: The Princes' Quest; Betizu eta urrezko zintzarria; Boo, Zino & the Snurks
Best Fictional Short Film: Salvador (historia de un milagro cotidiano); El pan nuestro; Padam...; Paseo; Proverbio chino	Best Animated Short Film: Tadeo Jones y el sótano maldito; Atención al cliente; El bufón y la infanta; La flor más grande del mundo; Perpetuum Mobile
Best Documentary Short Film: El hombre feliz; Carabanchel, un barrio de cine; El anónimo Caronte; Valkirias

=== Films with multiple nominations and awards ===
Films with multiple nominations
Nominations	Film
14	The Orphanage
14	13 Roses
10	Seven Billiard Tables
7	Under the Stars
7	Oviedo Express
5	Mataharis
5	Sunday Light
3	Solitary Fragments
3	Suso's Tower
3	Rec
2	The Field of Stars
2	Fados
2	Modesty
2	Lola, the Movie
2	The Heart of the Earth

Films with multiple awards
Awards	Film
7	The Orphanage
4	13 Roses
3	Solitary Fragments
2	Seven Billiard Tables
2	Under the Stars
2	Rec

== Honorary Goya ==
Actor Alfredo Landa was the recipient of the Honorary Goya Award.
