= La viuda negra =

La viuda negra may refer to:

- La viuda negra (film), a 1977 Mexican film starring Isela Vega and Mario Almada
- La viuda negra (TV series), a 2014 Spanish-language telenovela
- A Widow's Game, a 2025 Spanish film originally titled La viuda negra.
