= Sandra Hermida Muñiz =

Spanish film director and producer

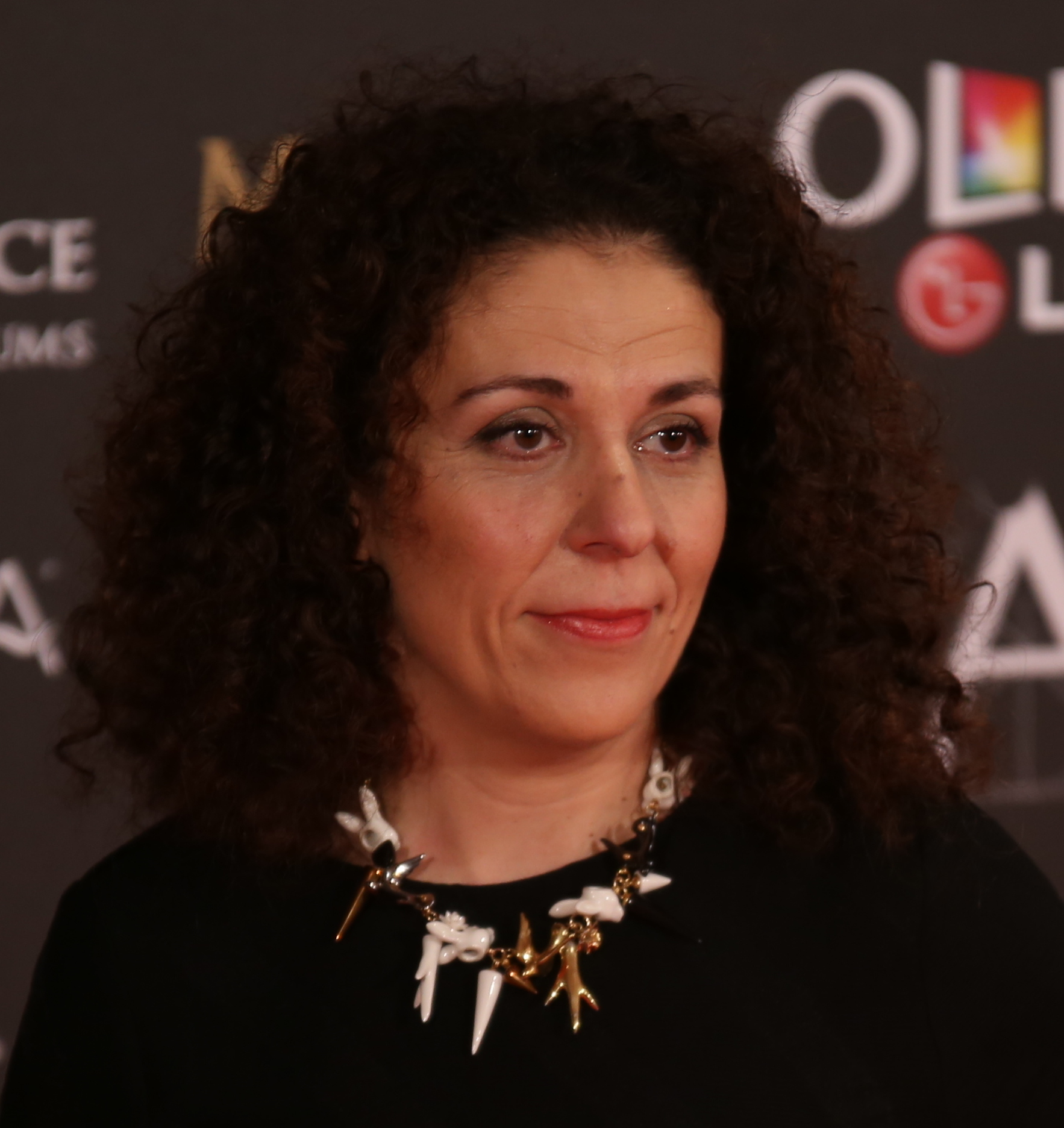
- Sandra Hermida at the 2017 Goya Awards
- Born: 22 July 1972 (age 54); Madrid, Spain
- Education: Complutense University of Madrid
- Occupations: Film producer, production manager
- Years active: 1998–present
- Awards: Goya Award (2007, 2010, 2012, 2016); Gaudí Award (2017)

Sandra Hermida Muñiz (born 22 July 1972) is a Spanish film producer and production manager. She has produced more than 30 domestic and international films, such as The Impatient Alchemist (2002), The Orphanage (2007), The Impossible (2012), and A Monster Calls (2016).

== Career ==
Sandra Hermida Muñiz holds a licentiate in image and sound from the Complutense University of Madrid. She began her film career in 1998 as coordinator (Spanish: regidora) of the film La primera noche de mi vida, directed by Miguel Albaladejo. In 2000, she worked as head of production on the film The Other Side, directed by Salvador García Ruiz.

She has been a producer on numerous films, such as The Impatient Alchemist by Patricia Ferreira, and The Orphanage, The Impossible, and A Monster Calls by J. A. Bayona. Her other film credits include Marrowbone, Aloft, Carmina y amén, La torre de Suso, Return to Hansala, Mediterranean Food, Spanish Movie, and Biutiful.

In addition, Hermida is a co-founder and director of Colosé Producciones, which she set up in 2004 with assistant director Javier Soto. Films produced by her company include 9 días en Haití, a short documentary by Oxfam Intermón, I Hate New York, and Mirage.

== Filmography ==
Year	Title	Role
1999	Famosos y familia (TV series)	Producer
2000	The Other Side	Head of production
2002	The Impatient Alchemist	Producer
2003	Los abajo firmantes	Producer
2003	Voices in the Night	Producer
2004	Hipnos	Producer
2006	Amor en defensa propia	Producer
2006	The Night of the Sunflowers	Producer, production manager
2006	Va a ser que nadie es perfecto	Producer
2007	The Orphanage	Executive producer, production manager
2007	La torre de Suso	Producer
2008	Las manos del pianista	Producer
2008	Mediterranean Food	Executive producer
2008	Return to Hansala	Producer
2008	No se preocupe	Producer
2009	Garbo: The Spy	Executive producer
2009	Spanish Movie	Producer
2010	Biutiful	Co-producer
2011	Entrevista	Producer
2011	Ghost Graduation	Producer
2012	El escondite	Producer
2012	The Impossible	Executive producer
2014	Aloft	Executive producer
2014	Autómata	Producer
2014	Carmina y amén	Executive producer
2015	9 días en Haití (short)	Executive producer
2016	A Monster Calls	Co-producer
2016	Petrona	Executive producer
2017	The Invisible Guest	Producer
2017	Marrowbone	Executive producer
2018	I Hate New York	Producer
2018	Mirage	Executive producer
2026	Karateka	Producer

== Awards ==
Hermida won Goya Awards for Best Production for The Orphanage (2007), The Impossible (2012), and A Monster Calls (2016), as well as one for Best Documentary Film for Garbo: The Spy in 2010. In 2013, she won for Outstanding Supporting Visual Effects in a Feature Motion Picture at the Visual Effects Society Awards for The Impossible. In 2017, she won the Gaudí Award for Best Production for A Monster Calls.
