= Goya Award for Best Cinematography =

Annual award by the Spanish Film Academy

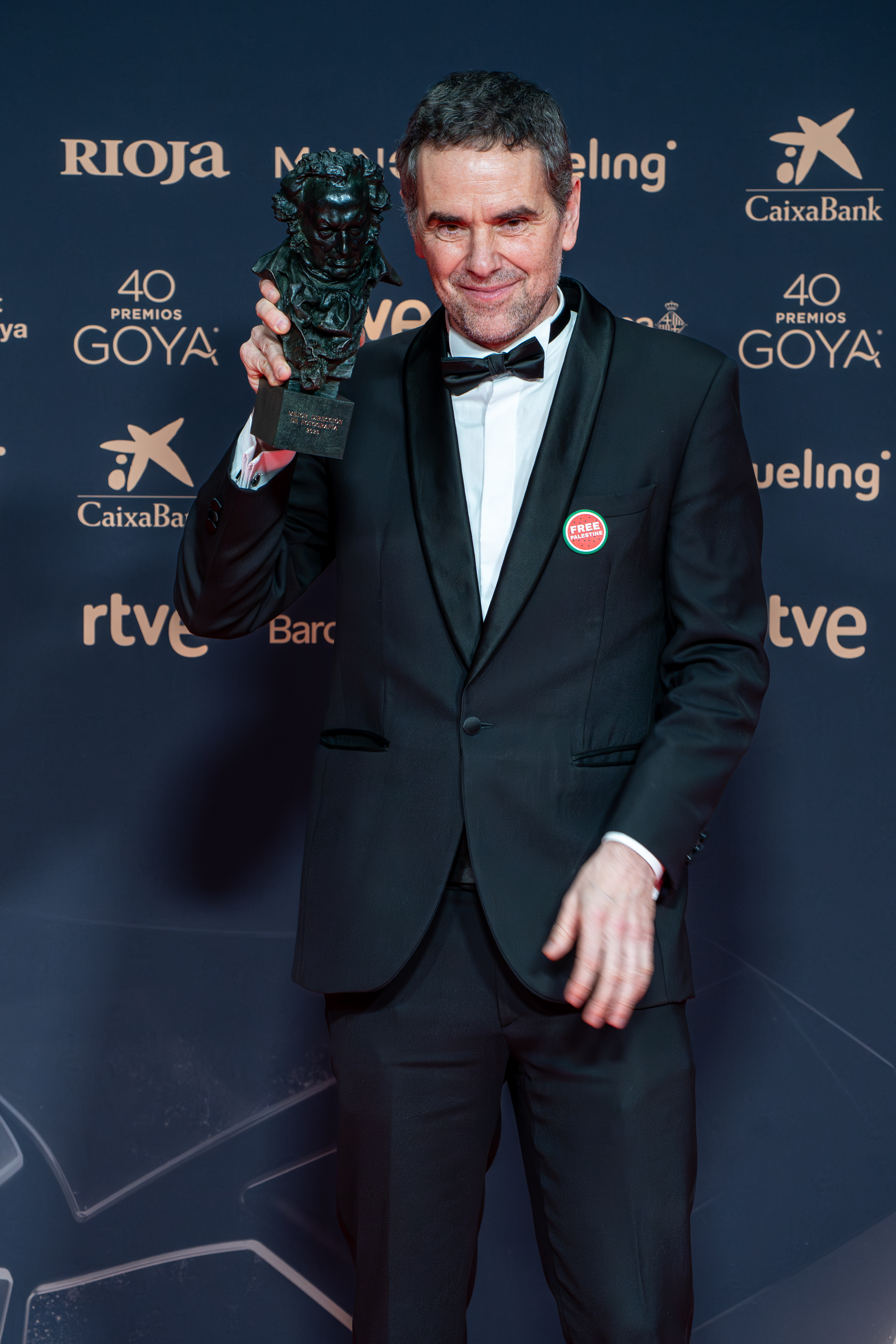
- The 2026 recipient: Mauro Herce
- Native name: Premio Goya a la mejor fotografía
- Awarded for: Best cinematography in a Spanish film of the year
- Country: Spain
- Presented by: Academy of Cinematographic Arts and Sciences of Spain (AACCE)
- First award: 1st Goya Awards (1986)
- Most recent winner: Mauro Herce; Sirāt (2025)
- Website: Official website

The Goya Award for Best Cinematography (Spanish: Premio Goya a la mejor fotografía) is one of the Goya Awards presented annually by the Academy of Cinematographic Arts and Sciences of Spain (AACCE) since the awards debuted in 1986. It is presented to a cinematographer for an outstanding work in one particular Spanish film.

Teodoro Escamilla was the first winner of the award for his work in Love, the Magician (1986). José Luis Alcaine holds the record of most nominations for this category with twenty, winning five of them. Javier Aguirresarobe is the most awarded in this category with six wins, for Prince of Shadows (1991), The Dog in the Manger (1996), The Others (2001), Soldiers of Salamina (2003) and The Sea Inside (2004). Guillermo Navarro also won the Academy Award for Best Cinematography for his work on Pan's Labyrinth.

In the list below the winner of the award for each year is shown first, followed by the other nominees.

== Winners and nominees ==
=== 1980s ===
Year	English title	Original title	Recipient(s)
1986 (1st)	Love, the Magician	El amor brujo	Teodoro Escamilla
1986 (1st)	Half of Heaven	La mitad del cielo	José Luis Alcaine
1986 (1st)	Werther		Hans Burmann
1987 (2nd)	Divine Words	Divinas palabras	Fernando Arribas
1987 (2nd)	La Rusa		Hans Burmann
1987 (2nd)	El bosque animado		Javier Aguirresarobe
1988 (3rd)	Rowing with the Wind	Remando al viento	Carlos Suárez
1988 (3rd)	Malaventura		José Luis Alcaine
1988 (3rd)	Women on the Verge of a Nervous Breakdown	Mujeres al borde de un ataque de nervios	José Luis Alcaine
1988 (3rd)	Berlin Blues	Berlín Blues	Teodoro Escamilla
1988 (3rd)	El Dorado		Teodoro Escamilla
1989 (4th)	Twisted Obsession	El sueño del mono loco	José Luis Alcaine
1989 (4th)	The Dark Night	La noche oscura	Teodoro Escamilla
1989 (4th)	Montoyas y tarantos		Teodoro Escamilla
1989 (4th)	Esquilache		Juan Amorós
1989 (4th)	Moon Child	El niño de la luna	Jaume Peracaula

=== 1990s ===
Year	English title	Original title	Recipient(s)
1990 (5th)	Letters from Alou	Las cartas de Alou	Alfredo F. Mayo
1990 (5th)	¡Ay, Carmela!		José Luis Alcaine
1990 (5th)	Tie Me Up! Tie Me Down!	¡Átame!	Hans Burmann
1991 (6th)	Prince of Shadows	Beltenebros	Javier Aguirresarobe
1991 (6th)	Don Juan in Hell	Don Juan en los infiernos	Carlos Suárez
1991 (6th)	The Dumbfounded King	El rey pasmado	Hans Burmann
1992 (7th)	Belle Époque		Juan Botella
1992 (7th)	The Fencing Master	El maestro de esgrima	Alfredo F. Mayo
1992 (7th)	The Sow	La marrana	Hans Burmann
1993 (8th)	The Bird of Happiness	El pájaro de la felicidad	José Luis Alcaine
1993 (8th)	La madre muerta		Javier Aguirresarobe
1993 (8th)	Madregilda		José Luis López-Linares
1994 (9th)	Cradle Song	Canción de cuna	Manuel Rojas
1994 (9th)	Running Out of Time	Días contados	Javier Aguirresarobe
1994 (9th)	The Turkish Passion	La pasión turca	José Luis Alcaine
1995 (10th)	Antarctica	Antártida	Javier Aguirresarobe
1995 (10th)	The Day of the Beast	El día de la bestia	Flavio Martínez Labiano
1995 (10th)	Flamenco		Vittorio Storaro
1996 (11th)	The Dog in the Manger	El perro del hortelano	Javier Aguirresarobe
1996 (11th)	La Celestina		José Luis López-Linares
1996 (11th)	Tramway to Malvarrosa	Tranvía a Malvarrosa	José Luis Alcaine
1997 (12th)	The Color of the Clouds	El color de las nubes	Jaume Peracaula
1997 (12th)	The Chambermaid on the Titanic	La camarera del Titanic	Patrick Blossier
1997 (12th)	In Praise of Older Women	En brazos de la mujer madura	José Luis Alcaine
1998 (13th)	Mararía		Juan Ruiz Anchía
1998 (13th)	The Girl of Your Dreams	La niña de tus ojos	Javier Aguirresarobe
1998 (13th)	The Grandfather	El abuelo	Raúl Pérez Cubero
1998 (13th)	Tango		Vittorio Storaro
1999 (14th)	Goya in Bordeaux	Goya en Burdeos	Vittorio Storaro
1999 (14th)	All About My Mother	Todo sobre mi madre	Affonso Beato
1999 (14th)	Butterfly's Tongue	La lengua de las mariposas	Javier G. Salmones
1999 (14th)	Volavérunt		Paco Femenía

=== 2000s ===
Year	English title	Original title	Recipient(s)
2000 (15th)	You're the One	You're the One (una historia de entonces)	Raúl Pérez Cubero
2000 (15th)	Calle 54		José Luis López-Linares
2000 (15th)	Common Wealth	La comunidad	Kiko de la Rica
2000 (15th)	Plenilune	Plenilunio	Gonzalo F. Berridi
2000 (15th)	The Sea	El mar	Jaume Peracaula
2001 (16th)	The Others	Los otros	Javier Aguirresarobe
2001 (16th)	Intacto		Xavi Giménez
2001 (16th)	Mad Love	Juana la loca	Paco Femenía
2001 (16th)	Sex and Lucia	Lucia y el sexo	Kiko de la Rica
2002 (17th)	Don Quixote, Knight Errant	El caballero Don Quijote	José Luis Alcaine
2002 (17th)	The Shanghai Spell	El embrujo de Shanghai	José Luis López-Linares
2002 (17th)	Story of a Kiss	Historia de un beso	Raúl Pérez Cubero
2002 (17th)	Nos miran		Néstor Calvo
2003 (18th)	Soldiers of Salamina	Soldados de Salamina	Javier Aguirresarobe
2003 (18th)	Carmen		Paco Femenía
2003 (18th)	The Galíndez File	El misterio Galíndez	Alfredo F. Mayo
2003 (18th)	South from Granada	Al sur de Granada	José Luis Alcaine
2004 (19th)	The Sea Inside	Mar adentro	Javier Aguirresarobe
2004 (19th)	Roma		José Luis Alcaine
2004 (19th)	Romasanta		Javier G. Salmones
2004 (19th)	Tiovivo c. 1950		Raúl Pérez Cubero
2005 (20th)	Iberia		José Luis López-Linares
2005 (20th)	Ninette		Raúl Pérez Cubero
2005 (20th)	Obaba		Javier Aguirresarobe
2005 (20th)	Otros días vendrán		José Luis Alcaine
2006 (21st)	Pan's Labyrinth	El laberinto del fauno	Guillermo Navarro
2006 (21st)	Alatriste		Paco Femenía
2006 (21st)	Salvador (Puig Antich)		David Omedes
2006 (21st)	''Volver		José Luis Alcaine
2007 (22nd)	13 Roses	Las 13 rosas	José Luis Alcaine
2007 (22nd)	Under the Stars	Bajo las estrellas	Álvaro Gutiérrez
2007 (22nd)	Seven Billiard Tables	Siete mesas de billar francés	Ángel Iguácel
2007 (22nd)	Oviedo Express		Carlos Suárez
2008 (23rd)	Just Walking	Sólo quiero caminar	Paco Femenía
2008 (23rd)	The Blind Sunflowers	Los girasoles ciegos	Hans Burmann
2008 (23rd)	The El Escorial Conspiracy	La conjura de El Escorial	Carlos Suárez
2008 (23rd)	Sangre de mayo		Félix Monti
2009 (24th)	Agora	Ágora	Xavi Giménez
2009 (24th)	After		Alex Catalán
2009 (24th)	Cell 211	Celda 211	Carles Gusi
2009 (24th)	The Secret in Their Eyes	El secreto de sus ojos	Félix Monti

=== 2010s ===
Year	English title	Original title	Recipient(s)
2010 (25th)	Black Bread	Pa negre (Pan negro)	Antonio Riestra
2010 (25th)	The Last Circus	Balada triste de trompeta	Kiko de la Rica
2010 (25th)	Biutiful		Rodrigo Prieto
2010 (25th)	Buried	Buried (Enterrado)	Eduard Grau
2011 (26th)	Blackthorn		Juan Antonio Ruiz Anchía
2011 (26th)	EVA		Arnau Valls Colomer
2011 (26th)	The Skin I Live In	La piel que habito	José Luis Alcaine
2011 (26th)	No Rest for the Wicked	No habrá paz para los malvados	Unax Mendia
2012 (27th)	Blancanieves		Kiko de la Rica
2012 (27th)	The Artist and the Model	El artista y la modelo	Daniel Vilar
2012 (27th)	The Impossible	Lo Imposible	Óscar Faura
2012 (27th)	Unit 7		Alex Catalán
2013 (28th)	Cannibal	Caníbal	Pau Esteve Birba
2013 (28th)	15 Years and One Day	15 años y un día	Juan Carlos Gómez
2013 (28th)	Witching & Bitching	Las brujas de Zugarramurdi	Kiko de la Rica
2013 (28th)	New York Shadows		Juan Pinzás, Cristina Trenas, Tote Trenas
2014 (29th)	Marshland	La isla mínima	Alex Catalán
2014 (29th)	Autómata		Alejandro Martínez
2014 (29th)	Spanish Affair	Ocho apellidos vascos	Kalo Berridi
2014 (29th)	El Niño		Carles Gusi
2015 (30th)	The Bride	La novia	Miguel Ángel Amoedo
2015 (30th)	The King of Havana	El Rey de la Habana	Josep Maria Civit
2015 (30th)	Nobody Wants the Night	Nadie quiere la noche	Jean-Claude Larrieu
2015 (30th)	A Perfect Day	Un día perfecto	Alex Catalán
2016 (31st)	A Monster Calls	Un monstruo viene a verme	Óscar Faura
2016 (31st)	1898, Our Last Men in the Philippines	1898, Los últimos de Filipinas	Alex Catalán
2016 (31st)	The Queen of Spain	La reina de España	José Luis Alcaine
2016 (31st)	The Fury of a Patient Man	Tarde para la ira	Arnau Valls Colomer
2017 (32nd)	Giant	Handia	Javier Agirre Erauso
2017 (32nd)	The Bookshop	La librería	Jean-Claude Larrieu
2017 (32nd)	Gold	Oro	Paco Femenía
2017 (32nd)	Summer 1993	Estiu 1993	Santiago Racaj
2018 (33rd)	Gun City	La sombra de la ley	Josu Inchaustegui
2018 (33rd)	Quién te cantará		Eduard Grau
2018 (33rd)	The Realm	El reino	Alejandro de Pablo
2018 (33rd)	Yuli: The Carlos Acosta Story	Yuli	Alex Catalán
2019 (34th)	Fire Will Come	O que arde	Mauro Herce
2019 (34th)	Pain and Glory	Dolor y gloria	José Luis Alcaine
2019 (34th)	The Endless Trench	La trinchera infinita	Javier Agirre Erauso
2019 (34th)	While at War	Mientras dure la guerra	Alex Catalán

=== 2020s ===
Year	English title	Original title	Recipient(s)
2020 (35th)	Schoolgirls	Las niñas	Daniela Cajías
2020 (35th)	Adú		Sergi Vilanova
2020 (35th)	Coven	Akelarre	Javier Agirre Erauso
2020 (35th)	Black Beach		Ángel Amorós
2021 (36th)	Mediterraneo: The Law of the Sea	Mediterráneo	Kiko de la Rica
2021 (36th)	The Good Boss	El buen patrón	Pau Esteve Birba
2021 (36th)	Libertad		Gris Jordana
2021 (36th)	Parallel Mothers	Madres paralelas	José Luis Alcaine
2022 (37th)	The Beasts	As bestas	Álex de Pablo
2022 (37th)	Alcarràs		Daniela Cajías
2022 (37th)	Lullaby	Cinco lobitos	Jon D. Domínguez
2022 (37th)	Official Competition	Competencia oficial	Arnau Valls Colomer
2022 (37th)	Prison 77	Modelo 77	Álex Catalán
2023 (38th)	Society of the Snow	La sociedad de la nieve	Pedro Luque
2023 (38th)	20,000 Species of Bees	20.000 especies de abejas	Gina Ferrer García
2023 (38th)	Close Your Eyes	Cerrar los ojos	Valentín Álvarez
2023 (38th)	Un amor		Bet Rourich
2023 (38th)	One Night with Adela	Una noche con Adela	Diego Trenas
2024 (39th)	The Room Next Door	La habitación de al lado	Edu Grau
2024 (39th)	The 47	El 47	Isaac Vila
2024 (39th)	Undercover	La infiltrada	Javier Salmones
2024 (39th)	Saturn Return	Segundo premio	Takuro Takeuchi
2024 (39th)	I'm Nevenka	Soy Nevenka	Gris Jordana
2025 (40th)	Sirāt		Mauro Herce
2025 (40th)	Sleepless City	Ciudad sin sueño	Rui Poças
2025 (40th)	Sundays	Los domingos	Bet Rourich
2025 (40th)	Los Tigres		Pau Esteve Birba
2025 (40th)	Maspalomas		Javier Agirre Erauso
