= Garbo: The Spy =

- Theatrical release poster
- Directed by: Edmon Roch
- Written by: Edmon Roch; Isaki Lacuesta; Maria Hervera
- Produced by: Edmon Roch; Sandra Hermida; Belen Bernuy
- Cinematography: Bet Rourich; Gabriel Guerra; Joachim Bergamin
- Edited by: Alexander Adams
- Music by: Fernando Velazquez
- Production companies: Ikiru Films; Colose Producciones; Centuria Films
- Release dates: October 20, 2009 (Rome); December 4, 2009 (Spain)
- Running time: 89 minutes
- Country: Spain
- Language: Spanish

Garbo: The Spy (also known as Garbo, the Man Who Saved the World and Garbo: El Espia) is a Spanish documentary about Juan Pujol Garcia's role in the Second World War, directed by Edmon Roch.

The documentary reconstructs the career of "Garbo," who formed the centrepiece of Allied deception and counter-information to have the Nazis believe that D-Day landing would occur in Pas-de-Calais and not in Normandy.

A number of individuals are interviewed including Nigel West (the pseudonym of intelligence expert Rupert Allason) and Aline Griffith, Countess of Romanones, a former OSS agent, as well as historian Mark Seaman, investigative journalist Xavier Vinader, and psychiatrist Stan Vranckx.

== Release ==
Garbo premiered at the Rome Film Festival on October 20, 2009, opened in Spain on December 4, 2009 and opened at the Village East Cinema in New York on July 23, 2010.

== See also ==
- Operation Fortitude
