= Modesty (film) =

- Theatrical release poster
- Spanish: Pudor
- Directed by: David Ulloa; Tristán Ulloa
- Screenplay by: Tristán Ulloa
- Based on: Pudor by Santiago Roncagliolo
- Produced by: José Antonio Félez
- Starring: Nancho Novo; Elvira Mínguez; Natalia Rodríguez Arroyo; Celso Bugallo; Carolina Román; Marcos Ruiz; Lorena Mateo; Manolo Solo; Nuria González; Joaquín Climent; Héctor Colomé
- Cinematography: David Omedes
- Edited by: Nacho Ruiz Capillas
- Music by: David Crespo
- Production company: Tesela PC
- Distributed by: Sogepaq
- Release dates: 16 March 2007 (Málaga); 13 April 2007 (Spain)
- Country: Spain
- Language: Spanish

Modesty (Spanish: Pudor) is a 2007 Spanish drama film directed by David Ulloa and Tristán Ulloa, based on the novel by Santiago Roncagliolo. Its cast features Nancho Novo, Elvira Mínguez, Natalia Rodríguez Arroyo, Celso Bugallo, Carolina Román, and Marcos Ruiz, among others.

== Plot ==
Set in Gijón (Note: Thus moving the setting of the original novel from Lima, Peru to the seaside Spanish city of Gijón, Asturias.) and dealing with the theme of family isolation, the plot tracks the plight and secrets of a number of characters, including lonely boy Sergio (inclined to talk to the dead), dying father Alfredo (diagnosed with brain tumour), anonimously sexting adoptive mother Julia, self-hating lesbian sister Marisa, and the widowed grandfather.

== Cast ==
- Nancho Novo as Alfredo
- Elvira Mínguez as Julia
- Natalia Rodríguez as Marisa
- Celso Bugallo as abuelo
- Carolina Román as Gloria
- Marcos Ruiz as Sergio
- Lorena Mateo as Carolina
- Manolo Solo as Hombre X
- Nuria González as Pilar
- Joaquín Climent as Juan Luis
- Héctor Colomé as Sr. Braun

== Production ==
Penned by Tristán Ulloa, the screenplay is an adaptation of the novel Pudor by Santiago Roncagliolo. The film was produced by Tesela PC (José Antonio Félez), with the participation of TVE and Canal+. Shooting locations included Gijón.

== Release ==
The film was presented at the 10th Málaga Film Festival in March 2007. Distributed by Sogepaq, the film was theatrically released in Spain on 13 April 2007.

== Reception ==
Jonathan Holland of Variety deemed the film to be "gritty, sometimes grueling and with a tendency to over-schematize", but "absorbing" nonetheless owing to "superb across-the-board perfs and a script that slowly winds its emotional spring to a cathartic final scene".

Fausto Fernández of Fotogramas rated Modesty 3 out of 5 stars, singling out the portrayal of the "viscerality and fragility of the characters" as the film's standout, while citing the "insistence" on the homosexual subplot as a negative point.

== Accolades ==
Year	Award	Category	Nominee(s)	Result	Ref.
2007	10th Málaga Film Festival	Best Actress	Elvira Mínguez	Won	
2007	42nd Karlovy Vary International Film Festival	Best Actress	Elvira Mínguez	Won	
2008	22nd Goya Awards	Best New Director	David Ulloa, Tristán Ulloa	Nominated	
2008	22nd Goya Awards	Best Adapted Screenplay	Tristán Ulloa	Nominated	

== See also ==
- List of Spanish films of 2007
