= Oviedo Express =

- Theatrical release poster
- Directed by: Gonzalo Suárez
- Written by: Gonzalo Suárez
- Produced by: Juan Gona
- Starring: Carmelo Gómez; Aitana Sánchez-Gijón; Maribel Verdú; Najwa Nimri; Jorge Sanz; Bárbara Goenaga; Alberto Jiménez
- Cinematography: Carlos Suárez
- Edited by: Celia Cervero
- Music by: Carles Cases
- Production company: Gona Cine y Televisión
- Distributed by: Universal Pictures
- Release date: 31 October 2007
- Country: Spain
- Language: Spanish

Oviedo Express is a 2007 Spanish comedy-drama film directed and written by Gonzalo Suárez. It stars Carmelo Gómez, Aitana Sánchez-Gijón, Maribel Verdú, Najwa Nimri, Jorge Sanz, Bárbara Goenaga and Alberto Jiménez.

== Plot ==
The plot was reportedly inspired on Stefan Zweig's Fear, although barely anything of the work (the nexus with the intrigue if at all) is identifiable in the film. A troupe of thespians moves to Oviedo to stage a play based on La Regenta. Mariola Mayo is the leading actress performing the stage role of La Regenta/Ana Ozores. The Mayor of Oviedo has an affair with journalist Bárbara Ruiz. Emma (a nod to Madame Bovary's character), the scorned spouse of the Mayor of Oviedo and a young scholar preparing a PhD dissertation on La Regenta, portrays a sort of Regenta-like in-fiction character. Emma has sexual intercourse with Benjamín Olmo, the leading actor of the play.

== Cast ==
- Carmelo Gómez as Benjamín Olmo
- Aitana Sánchez-Gijón as Mariola Mayo
- Maribel Verdú as Mina
- Najwa Nimri as Bárbara Ruiz
- Jorge Sanz as Álvaro Mesía
- Bárbara Goenaga as Emma
- Alberto Jiménez as Ernesto de Villamarín, the Mayor
- Silvia Marty
- Víctor Clavijo
- Carmen Ruiz-Tilve

== Production ==
The project was originally titled Érase una vez Oviedo. The film was shot in Oviedo in 2006.

== Release ==
The film was theatrically released in Spain on 31 October 2007.

== Reception ==
Alberto Bermejo of El Mundo rated the film 4 out of 5 stars, writing that "above many other things, 'Oviedo Express' is very funny, even though it is much more than a comedy", with additional superimposed layers of farce, vaudeville, melodrama, and caricature, also featuring a cast of actors taking risks "in unusual registers" delivering the elaborated and "highly personal" dialogues of Gonzalo Suárez.

Jonathan Holland of Variety deemed the film to be "a typically eccentric dramedy" and (so much) "over-the-top", featuring a "bunch of fine Spanish actors overacting for all they're worth".

== Accolades ==
Year	Award	Category	Nominee(s)	Result	Ref.
2008	22nd Goya Awards	Best Original Screenplay	Gonzalo Suárez	Nominated	
2008	22nd Goya Awards	Best New Actress	Bárbara Goenaga	Nominated	
2008	22nd Goya Awards	Best Production Supervision	Teresa Cepeda	Nominated	
2008	22nd Goya Awards	Best Cinematography	Carlos Suárez	Nominated	
2008	22nd Goya Awards	Best Original Score	Carles Cases	Nominated	
2008	22nd Goya Awards	Best Art Direction	Wolfang Burmann	Nominated	
2008	22nd Goya Awards	Best Makeup and Hairstyles	Lourdes Briones, Fermín Galán	Nominated	
2008	17th Actors and Actresses Union Awards	Best Film Actor in a Secondary Role	Jorge Sanz	Nominated	

== See also ==
- List of Spanish films of 2007

== Bibliography ==
- Nogueira Otero, Xosé (2018). "Oviedo Express, de Gonzalo Suárez: el género degenerado (una vez más)". Quintana (17). Santiago de Compostela: Universidade de Santiago de Compostela. doi:10.15304/qui.17.5181.
