= Always Yours (film) =

- Theatrical release poster
- Spanish: Tuya siempre
- Directed by: Manuel Lombardero
- Screenplay by: Manuel Lombardero; Ignacio del Moral
- Produced by: Pastora Delgado
- Starring: Flora Martínez; Rubén Ochandiano; José Coronado; Caroline Henderson
- Cinematography: José Luis Alcaine
- Edited by: Bernat Aragonés
- Music by: Horacio Fumero; José Reinoso
- Production companies: Pastora Delgado PC; Films d'Ultramort
- Distributed by: Azeta Cinema
- Release dates: 13 March 2007 (Málaga); 27 April 2007 (Spain)
- Country: Spain
- Language: Spanish

Always Yours (Spanish: Tuya siempre) is a 2007 Spanish neo-noir drama film directed by Manuel Lombardero. It stars Flora Martínez, Rubén Ochandiano, José Coronado, and Caroline Henderson.

== Plot ==
The fiction follows Lola and her boyfriend Alfredo, a petty criminal. The former begins working in a jazz club frequented by quaint individuals (including a forensic photographer, a young musician going blind, an alcoholic pianist, and a jazz singer) but the entry on the scene of mafioso Manuel Gay causes disruption.

== Cast ==
- Flora Martínez as Lola
- Rubén Ochandiano as Alfredo
- José Coronado as Manuel Gay
- Caroline Henderson as Gloria Cole
- Nancho Novo as Horacio
- Andrés Gertrúdix as César
- Raynald Colom as Nen

== Production ==
The screenplay was penned by Manuel Lombardero alongside Ignacio del Moral. The film was produced by Pastora Delgado PC and Films d'Ultramort, and it had the participation of TVE.

== Release ==
The film screened at the Málaga Film Festival in March 2007. Distributed by Azeta Cinema, it was theatrically released in Spain on 27 April 2007.

== Reception ==
Jonathan Holland of Variety considered that despite boasting a "pleasant jazz score", a clutch of "decent" performances, and coming with all the genre trimmings, "the script fails to whip them up into anything beyond an efficient exercise in style".

Javier Ocaña of El País deemed Always Yours to be "a painful, somber film with a great sound and image design", featuring a "atmosphere, credibility and a formal design that is as risky as it is meritorious", but also pointed out at a flawed direction of actors, as each one of them performs in a different dramatic range.

== Accolades ==
Year	Award	Category	Nominee(s)	Result	Ref.
2007	10th Málaga Film Festival	Best Supporting Actor	Nancho Novo	Won	
2007	10th Málaga Film Festival	Best Music	José Reinoso, Horacio Fumero	Won	
2007	10th Málaga Film Festival	Best Makeup	Gregorio Ros	Won	
2008	22nd Goya Awards	Best Sound	Licio Marcos de Oliveira, Carlos Fesser, David Calleja	Nominated	

== See also ==
- List of Spanish films of 2007
