= Génesis: en la mente del asesino =

Spanish television series

- Genre: Police procedural; Thriller; Mystery
- Directed by: Ignacio Mercero; Juan González; Javier Quintas
- Starring: Verónica Sánchez; Pep Munné; Quim Gutiérrez; Álvaro Báguena; Sonia Almarcha; María Almudéver; Fanny Gautier; Juana Acosta; Enrique Arce; Roger Coma
- Country of origin: Spain
- Original language: Spanish
- No. of seasons: 2
- No. of episodes: 22

Production
- Executive producers: Gregorio Quintana; Jorge Redondo
- Running time: 50 min (approx.)
- Production company: Ida y Vuelta

Original release
- Network: Cuatro
- Release: 3 May 2006 – 22 April 2007

Génesis: en la mente del asesino or simply Génesis is a Spanish police procedural television series produced by Ida y vuelta. Its two seasons aired on Cuatro from 2006 to 2007.

== Premise ==
The plot concerns the work of a police unit created specifically to deal with particularly sadistic and unfathomable crimes. To that end, the unit tries to get to the criminal's mind by using psychology and criminal anthropology methods.

== Cast ==
- Verónica Sánchez as Lola Casado.
- Pep Munné as Mateo.
- Quim Gutiérrez as Daniel "Dani".
- Álvaro Báguena as Gustavo.
- Sonia Almarcha as Laura.
- María Almudéver as Fátima.

Introduced in season 2

- Fanny Gautier as Alex.
- Juana Acosta as Sofías.
- Enrique Arce as Julián.
- Roger Coma as Seca.

== Production and release ==
Génesis: en la mente del asesino was produced by Ida y vuelta. The episodes were directed by Ignacio Mercero, Juan González and Javier Quintas, whereas the writing team was formed by Darío Madrona, Diego Sotelo, Andoni de Carlos, José Antonio Valverde, Aitor Gabilondo, Carlos Vila, Javier Holgado and José Luis Latasa. Gregorio Quintana and Jorge Redondo were credited as executive producers. The series premiered on Cuatro 3 May 2006 and it earned "good" viewership ratings in the first episode (1,127,000 viewers and 6.1% share), above the channel's average. The episodes featured a running time of 50 minutes (rather than the 70 minutes traditional for prime time Spanish television titles). Despite the waning interest, the series was renovated for a second season. Fanny Gautier, Juana Acosta, Enrique Arce and Roger Coma were added to the cast to compensate for the leaving of Verónica Sánchez.

The broadcasting run ended after 2 seasons and 22 episodes on 22 April 2007.

Series	Episodes	Originally released			Ref.
Series	Episodes	First released	Last released	Network	Ref.
1	9	3 May 2006	8 June 2006	Cuatro	
2	13	28 January 2007	22 April 2007	Cuatro	

=== Season 1 ===
No. overall	No. in season	Title	Original release date
1	1	"Los desastres de la guerra"	3 May 2006
2	2	"Las lágrimas de Raimmis"	10 May 2006
3	3	"La estrella de Satán"	17 May 2006
4	4	"Ojos sin vida"	24 May 2006
5	5	"Pacto de sangre"	31 May 2006
6	6	"En la oscuridad"	7 June 2006
7	7	"Suicidas"	14 June 2006
8	8	"La virtud del asesino (1)"	21 June 2006
9	9	"La virtud del asesino (2)"	28 June 2006

=== Season 2 ===
No. overall	No. in season	Title	Original release date
10	1	"El árbol de la vida"	28 January 2007
11	2	"Secuestro"	4 February 2007
12	3	"El candidato"	11 February 2007
13	4	"Causa desconocida"	18 February 2007
14	5	"Obsesión"	25 February 2007
15	6	"Caza mayor"	4 March 2007
16	7	"En la carretera"	11 March 2007
17	8	"Voces"	18 March 2007
18	9	"Alta seguridad"	25 March 2007
19	10	"Sin aliento"	1 April 2007
20	11	"Handicap"	8 April 2007
21	12	"Fotos familiares"	15 April 2007
22	13	"Solteros"	22 April 2007
