= Lola, the Movie =

- Theatrical release poster
- Spanish: Lola, la película
- Directed by: Miguel Hermoso
- Screenplay by: Antonio Onetti
- Produced by: Tedy Villalba; Agustí Mezquida
- Starring: Gala Évora; José Luis García Pérez; Carlos Hipólito; Antonio Morales; David Arnaiz; José Manuel Cervino; Ana Fernández
- Cinematography: Hans Burmann
- Edited by: Koldo Idígoras
- Music by: Víctor Reyes
- Production companies: Ensueño Films; Prodigius Audiovisual
- Distributed by: DeAPlaneta
- Release dates: 9 March 2007 (Málaga); 16 March 2007 (Spain)
- Country: Spain
- Language: Spanish

Lola, the Movie (Spanish: Lola, la película) is a 2007 Spanish biographical drama film directed by Miguel Hermoso from a screenplay by Antonio Onetti which stars Gala Évora as the title character.

== Plot ==
Lola Flores is a little girl who lives in Jerez with her family. Very early on, she is struck by the flamenco dancing of a gypsy neighborhood. The year is 1935, and Lola is determined to do her best to become a great dancer. Despite the years of war and Franco's repression, Lola grows to the rhythm of endless dances and rehearsals, which she pushes herself to the point of exhaustion. Finally, Lola has her first opportunity to perform in public with Manolo Caracol. Then, Lola performs at the Variedades Theater in Jerez, performing the song "Soy de Jerez," to great acclaim. These are the first steps for a Lola who grows quickly and travels through the southern towns taking part in traveling shows.

These are difficult beginnings that soon pay off when Lola is chosen to be part of a film in Madrid. After living this experience, accompanied by her mother Rosario, the Flores family decides to move to the capital to support their talented daughter's career. Madrid initially presents itself as more hostile than Lola imagined, and after several minor performances in northern Spain, she manages to start her own company with the help of an antique dealer interested in her. In this company, she forms an artistic and romantic partnership with Manolo Caracol, who was the one who gave her her first stage opportunity.

From this moment on, Lola Flores' life is nothing short of success, and with the premiere of her show, Zambra, she reaches the ears of all of Spain. Later, films, travel, and so on would follow, but there is one thing Lola is obsessed with: starting a family. This desire to be a mother and escape the emotionally unstable life that show business entails will lead her to several relationships in search of true love, which she finally finds in Antonio González, "El Pescaílla."

== Cast ==
- Gala Évora as Lola
- José Luis García Pérez as Manolo Caracol
- Carlos Hipólito as Arenzana
- Manolo Solo as Joaquín Romero
- Alfonso Begara as Antonio González
- Ramón Villegas as Biosca
- Antonio Morales as Perico González
- Kiti Mánver as Mari Blanca
- José Manuel Cervino as Heredia
- David Arnaiz as Carlitos
- Ana Fernández as Rosario
- Álvaro Morte as Rafael Torres

== Production ==
The film is an Ensueño Films and Prodigius Audiovisual production.

== Release ==
The film opened the 10th Málaga Film Festival on 9 March 2007. Distributed by DeAPlaneta, it was released theatrically in Spain on 16 March 2007.

== Reception ==
Jonathan Holland of Variety wrote that the film "looks and sounds fine but remains happily hagiographic".

Mirito Torreiro of Fotogramas rated the film 3 out of 5 stars, highlighting the way Évora takes over Lola Flores' character as the film's hallmark, while negatively citing the beginning of the film which may have been cut.

== Accolades ==
Year	Award	Category	Nominee(s)	Result	Ref.
2008	22nd Goya Awards	Best New Actress	Gala Évora	Nominated	
2008	22nd Goya Awards	Best Costume Design	Sonia Grande	Nominated	

== See also ==
- List of Spanish films of 2007
