= Cándida (2006 film) =

Candida
- Directed by: Javier Fesser
- Starring: Candida Villar, Jorge Bosch, Raúl Peña
- Release date: 2006
- Running time: 103 min.
- Country: Spain
- Language: Spanish

Candida is a 2006 Spanish comedy film by Javier Fesser with Candida Villar, Jorge Bosch and Raul Pena. The film was nominated in the category Best Original Song at the 22nd Goya Awards for "La vida secreta de las pequeñas cosas" by David Broza and Jorge Drexler.
