= Under the Stars (2007 film) =

- Theatrical release poster
- Spanish: Bajo las estrellas
- Directed by: Félix Viscarret
- Screenplay by: Félix Viscarret
- Based on: El trompetista del Utopía by Fernando Aramburu
- Starring: Alberto San Juan; Emma Suárez; Julián Villagrán; Violeta Rodríguez
- Cinematography: Álvaro Gutiérrez
- Edited by: Ángel Hernández Zoido
- Music by: Mikel Salas
- Production company: Fernando Trueba PC
- Distributed by: Notro Films
- Release dates: 15 March 2007 (Málaga); 15 June 2007 (Spain)
- Running time: 108 minutes
- Country: Spain
- Language: Spanish

Under the Stars (Spanish: Bajo las estrellas) is a 2007 Spanish comedy-drama film directed and written by Félix Viscarret based on the novel by Fernando Aramburu which stars Alberto San Juan alongside Emma Suárez, Julián Villagrán, and Violeta Rodríguez.

== Plot ==
The plot follows freeloading trumpeter Benito Lacunza upon his return from Madrid to his Navarrese hometown (Estella-Lizarra) in the wake of his father's impending death, and his relation with brother Lalo, Lalo's partner Nines, and Nines' withdrawn daughter Ainara.

== Cast ==
- Alberto San Juan as Benito Lacunza
- Emma Suárez as Nines
- Julián Villagrán as Lalo
- Violeta Rodríguez as Ainara
- Luz Valdenebro as Pauli

== Production ==
The film is based on the novel El trompetista del Utopía by Fernando Aramburu. A Fernando Trueba PC production, it had the participation of TVE and Canal+. Shooting locations included Estella-Lizarra.

== Release ==
The film was presented at the 10th Málaga Film Festival in March 2007. It was released theatrically in Spain on 15 June 2007.

== Reception ==
Jonathan Holland of Variety considered that the film features "an ace performance from Alberto San Juan, who makes the movie his own by simply flooding it with humanity".

Javier Ocaña of El País deemed the film to be a "a comedy with dramatic overtones endowed with an unusual visual poetry".

== Accolades ==
Year	Award	Category	Nominee(s)	Result	Ref.
2007	10th Málaga Film Festival	Golden Biznaga		Won	
2007	10th Málaga Film Festival	Best Director	Félix Viscarret	Won	
2007	10th Málaga Film Festival	Best Actor	Alberto San Juan	Won	
2007	10th Málaga Film Festival	Best New Screenplay	Félix Viscarret	Won	
2008	22nd Goya Awards	Best Adapted Screenplay	Félix Viscarret	Won	
2008	22nd Goya Awards	Best New Director	Félix Viscarret	Nominated	
2008	22nd Goya Awards	Best Actor	Alberto San Juan	Won	
2008	22nd Goya Awards	Best Actress	Emma Suárez	Nominated	
2008	22nd Goya Awards	Best Supporting Actor	Julián Villagrán	Nominated	
2008	22nd Goya Awards	Best Original Score	Mikel Salas	Nominated	
2008	22nd Goya Awards	Best Cinematography	Álvaro Gutiérrez	Nominated	
2008	17th Actors and Actresses Union Awards	Best Film Actor in a Leading Role	Alberto San Juan	Nominated	
2008	17th Actors and Actresses Union Awards	Best New Actor	Julián Villagrán	Nominated	

== See also ==
- List of Spanish films of 2007
