= 13 Roses =

2007 Spanish film

- Theatrical release poster
- Spanish: Las 13 Rosas
- Directed by: Emilio Martínez-Lázaro
- Screenplay by: Ignacio Martínez de Pisón
- Story by: Pedro Costa; Ignacio Martínez de Pisón; Emilio Martínez Lázaro
- Produced by: Enrique Cerezo; Pedro Costa
- Starring: Pilar López de Ayala; Verónica Sánchez; Marta Etura; Nadia de Santiago; Gabriella Pession; Félix Gómez; Fran Perea; Enrico Lo Verso; Asier Etxeandia; Alberto Ferreiro; Adriano Giannini; Goya Toledo
- Cinematography: José Luis Alcaine
- Edited by: Fernando Pardo
- Music by: Roque Baños
- Production companies: Enrique Cerezo PC; Pedro Costa PC; Filmexport Group
- Distributed by: Alta Classics
- Release date: 19 October 2007
- Running time: 132 minutes
- Countries: Spain; Italy
- Language: Spanish

13 Roses (Spanish: Las 13 Rosas) is a 2007 historical drama film directed by Emilio Martínez Lázaro. The film features performances by Pilar López de Ayala, Verónica Sánchez, and Marta Etura. Based on true events, it portrays the harrowing story of thirteen young women, known as "las Trece Rosas", who were executed by a Francoist firing squad shortly after conclusion of the Spanish Civil War, highlighting their unwavering commitment to their ideals.

== Plot ==
The film takes place in Madrid in 1939 during the final days of the Spanish Civil War. Virtudes and Carmen, two young idealistic Republican militants, encourage their neighbors to keep faith in the cause of the Second Republic. However, the entry of Franco’s Nationalist troops into the city is imminent. Fearing bloody repression, many Republicans flee the country, while others are either unable or unwilling to do so.

Julia, a tram conductor, and her friend Adelina, a Red Cross worker, are also active sympathizers of the Spanish Republic. While spending an evening in a nightclub watching musicians perform, one of the last bombings of the city occurs. In these dire circumstances, they befriend Blanca, whose husband, Enrique, is the band leader.

The victory of the Nationalists marks a dark turning point for Republican sympathizers. Canepa, a musician in Enrique’s band and a Republican militant, fears for his life and decides to escape the country. Blanca secretly provides him with money for his escape. Julia, meanwhile, starts a relationship with Perico, a young Nationalist soldier.

Rumors circulate about a plot to assassinate Franco upon his victorious entry, prompting the Nationalists to seek revenge. Although the young women have no involvement in the plot, they become targets due to their leftist activities. Julia is the first arrested, brutally tortured by Fontenla, the cold-hearted officer leading the interrogations. Adelina, Virtudes’ co-worker and a member of a socialist group, is turned in by her well-meaning father, who naively believes she is only wanted for questioning and will not face serious consequences.

Canepa and Teo are betrayed by friends and neighbors, leading to their arrest and torture. Canepa dies by suicide in custody. Teo, however, is released on the condition that he secretly assists authorities in capturing other Republican sympathizers. With Teo’s coerced assistance, the young women are arrested one by one until all are imprisoned. Only Carmen, the youngest, realizes Teo’s betrayal before she too is arrested. Blanca shares their fate; her crime is giving Canepa money. After enduring harsh interrogations, the group of young women is transferred to an overcrowded prison.

In jail, the reunion of the girls provides some solace amid their harsh circumstances. At one point, they even find a moment of joy in tap dancing. Their families, including Adelina’s grief-stricken father, remain hopeful for their eventual release. Blanca remains tormented by worry for her young son, whom she had to leave behind. Her dignified demeanor earns the respect of the prison warden.

The situation worsens when the imprisoned women protest the terrible sanitary conditions affecting the children held with their mothers. They collectively refuse to sing praises to the Franco regime, further angering their captors. The fate of the 13 young women is sealed when two military officers and an innocent woman are killed by leftist militants. As retribution, the regime orders the execution of some prisoners, despite their lack of involvement in the incident. A military court condemns 48 men and 13 women to death within 48 hours.

Carmen, the youngest, is the sole survivor. Devastated, she listens to the gunshots that kill her friends.

The film’s final frame asserts that most of its content is verified by historical documentation, and that the script relies heavily on actual dialogue and writings from the central characters.

== Cast ==
- Pilar López de Ayala as Blanca
- Verónica Sánchez as Julia
- Marta Etura as Virtudes
- Nadia de Santiago as Carmen
- Gabriella Pession as Adelina
- Félix Gómez as Perico
- Fran Perea as Teo
- Enrico Lo Verso as Canepa
- Adriano Giannini as Fontenla
- Goya Toledo as Carmen Castro
- Asier Etxeandia as Enrique
- Bárbara Lennie as Dionisia
- Arantxa Aranguren as Manuela
- María Cotiello as Elena
- Alberto Ferreiro as Valentí
- María Isasi as Trini
- Luisa Martín as Dolores
- Secun de la Rosa as Satur
- José Manuel Cervino as Jacinto

== Production ==
The film is a Spanish-Italian co-production by Enrique Cerezo PC, Pedro Costa PC and Filmexport Group.

== Release ==
Distributed by Alta Classics, 13 Roses was released theatrically in Spain on 19 October 2007. The film had a limited release in the United States in New York City.

== Reception ==
=== Critical response ===
Jonathan Holland of Variety praised the cinematography and art direction, but remarked: "The 13 Roses largely withers on the vine. [The film] is further let down by its psychological superficiality... an uncertain treatment which convinces neither historically nor dramatically". Academic analysis by David Rodríguez-Solás discusses the film’s portrayal of victimization, suggesting that it employs melodramatic elements that may impede critical reflection on historical events.

=== Accolades ===
Year	Award	Category	Nominee(s)	Result	Ref.
2008	22nd Goya Awards	Best Film		Nominated	
2008	22nd Goya Awards	Best Director	Emilio Martínez Lázaro	Nominated	
2008	22nd Goya Awards	Best Original Screenplay	Ignacio Martínez de Pisón	Nominated	
2008	22nd Goya Awards	Best Supporting Actor	José Manuel Cervino	Won	
2008	22nd Goya Awards	Best New Actress	Nadia de Santiago	Nominated	
2008	22nd Goya Awards	Best Original Score	Roque Baños	Won	
2008	22nd Goya Awards	Best Production Supervision	Martín Cabañas	Nominated	
2008	22nd Goya Awards	Best Cinematography	José Luis Alcaine	Won	
2008	22nd Goya Awards	Best Editing	Fernando Pardo	Nominated	
2008	22nd Goya Awards	Best Art Direction	Edou Hydallgo	Nominated	
2008	22nd Goya Awards	Best Costume Design	Lena Mossum	Won	
2008	22nd Goya Awards	Best Makeup and Hairstyles	Almudena Fonseca, José Juez, Mariló Osuna	Nominated	
2008	22nd Goya Awards	Best Sound	Alfonso Pino, Carlos Bonmatí, Carlos Faruolo	Nominated	
2008	22nd Goya Awards	Best Special Effects	Carlos Lozano, Pau Costa, Raúl Romanillos	Nominated	
2008	17th Actors and Actresses Union Awards	Best Film Actress in a Secondary Role	Marta Etura	Nominated	
2008	17th Actors and Actresses Union Awards	Best Film Actress in a Minor Role	Nadia de Santiago	Nominated	
2008	17th Actors and Actresses Union Awards	Best Film Actress in a Minor Role	María Isasi	Nominated	
2008	17th Actors and Actresses Union Awards	Best Film Actor in a Minor Role	José Manuel Cervino	Won	
2008	13th Forqué Awards	Best Film		Nominated	

== See also ==
- List of Spanish films of 2007

== Bibliography ==
- Mary Farrelly (2021) A work of death: martyrdom, myth and dead women in contemporary Spanish film, Journal of Spanish Cultural Studies, 22:1, 77–93, DOI: 10.1080/14636204.2021.1880785
- Larson, Kajsa C. 2012. “Remembering the Thirteen Roses: Blurring Fact and Fiction.” Nomenclatura: Aproximaciones a Los Estudios Hispánicos 2: 1–21. doi:10.13023/naeh.2012.08.
- Rodríguez-Solás, D. (2016). ‘I haven’t done anything wrong!’Melodrama and victimization in Las 13 rosas/13 Roses (2007) and La voz dormida/The Sleeping Voice (2011). Studies in Spanish & Latin American Cinemas, 13(3), 303–317.
