= The Wooden Box (film) =

- Film poster
- Spanish: La caja
- Directed by: Juan Carlos Falcón
- Screenplay by: Juan Carlos Falcón
- Produced by: Andrés Santana
- Starring: Ángela Molina; Elvira Mínguez; Antonia San Juan; Vladimir Cruz; María Galiana; Manuel Manquiña; Joan Dalmau; Jordi Dauder; Rogério Samora; José M. Cervino
- Cinematography: Gonzalo Berridi
- Edited by: José Salcedo
- Music by: Joan Valent
- Production companies: Aiete-Ariane films; Oberón Cinematográfica; Take 2000
- Release dates: 27 October 2006 (Seminci); 1 June 2007 (Spain)
- Countries: Spain; Portugal
- Language: Spanish

The Wooden Box (Spanish: La caja) is a 2006 Spanish-Portuguese black comedy film directed and written by Juan Carlos Falcón in his directorial feature debut which stars Ángela Molina, Elvira Mínguez, Antonia San Juan, Vladimir Cruz, and María Galiana.

== Plot ==
Set in a Canarian village in 1965, the plot follows Eloísa, a widow who sets a makeshift wake for her deceased husband Don Lucio (with whom all the locals have scores to settle) in the residence of her friend Isabel.

== Cast ==
- Ángela Molina as Eloísa
- Elvira Mínguez as Isabel
- Antonia San Juan as Benigna
- Vladimir Cruz as Jorge
- María Galiana as Doña Josefa
- Manuel Manquiña
- Joan Dalmau
- Jordi Dauder
- Rogério Samora
- José Manuel Cervino
- María del Carmen Sánchez
- Petite Lorena

== Production ==
The Wooden Box is inspired by Víctor Ramírez's novel Nos dejaron el muerto. It is a Spanish-Portuguese co-production by Aiete-Ariane Films and Oberón Cinematográfica alongside Take 2000, with support from Ayuntamiento de Las Palmas de Gran Canaria, Ayuntamiento de Pájara, Cabildo Insular de La Palma, Cabildo Insular de Fuerteventura, Patronato de Turismo de La Palma, and Canarias Cultura en Red. It was shot in the islands of Fuerteventura and La Palma while filming for some indoor footage took place in Madrid.

== Release ==
The film was selected for screening out of competition at the 51st Valladolid International Film Festival on 27 October 2006. It was theatrically released in Spain on 1 June 2007.

== Reception ==
Pere Vall of Fotogramas rated the film 3 out of 5 stars, highlighting its looks and the actresses as the best things about the film whilst citing the characters of Vladimir Cruz and Jordi Dauder as the worst things about it.

Javier Ocaña of El País considered that despite a story with almost always promising situations, the black comedy film is flawed because of a mise-en-scène that "is continually stagnant", the editing, and dialogues which are not as fast as they should be, writing that "it is as if Robert Bresson had filmed a script by Luis García Berlanga".

== Accolades ==
Year	Award	Category	Nominee(s)	Result	Ref.
2007	Montreal World Film Festival	Golden Zenith		Won	
2007	12th Toulouse Spanish Film Festival	Golden Violet		Won	
2008	17th Actors and Actresses Union Awards	Best Film Actor in a Secondary Role	Vladimir Cruz	Nominated	

== See also ==
- List of Spanish films of 2007
