= Djiarama =

- Directed by: Alicia Fdez Carmena, Chus Barrera
- Screenplay by: Alicia Fdez Carmena, Chus Barrera
- Produced by: Nimba, El Deseo S.A.
- Starring: Mamadou Camara, Sidiki Camara, Ibrahim Afrokoná, Sema Souma, Kemok Kouyaté
- Cinematography: Pablo Barrio
- Edited by: Chus Barrera
- Music by: Antonio Carmona
- Release date: 2007
- Running time: 75 minutes
- Country: Spain

Djiarama is a Spanish 2007 documentary film.

== Synopsis ==
A team from the Canary Island NGO, Nimba, travels through Conakry, Guinea, screening the documentary Europa: ¿paraíso o espejismo? (Europe: Paradise or mirage?) in which five Sub-Saharan immigrants recount their experiences as they traveled from Africa to the coast of the Canary Islands. People from different social groups talk about the country's situation, what leads people to leave and the possible solutions to a conflict that, unfortunately, is very in force.

== Awards ==
- Docupolis 2007
- Docusur 2007

== See also ==
- List of Spanish films of 2007
