= Fanny Gautier =

Spanish actress

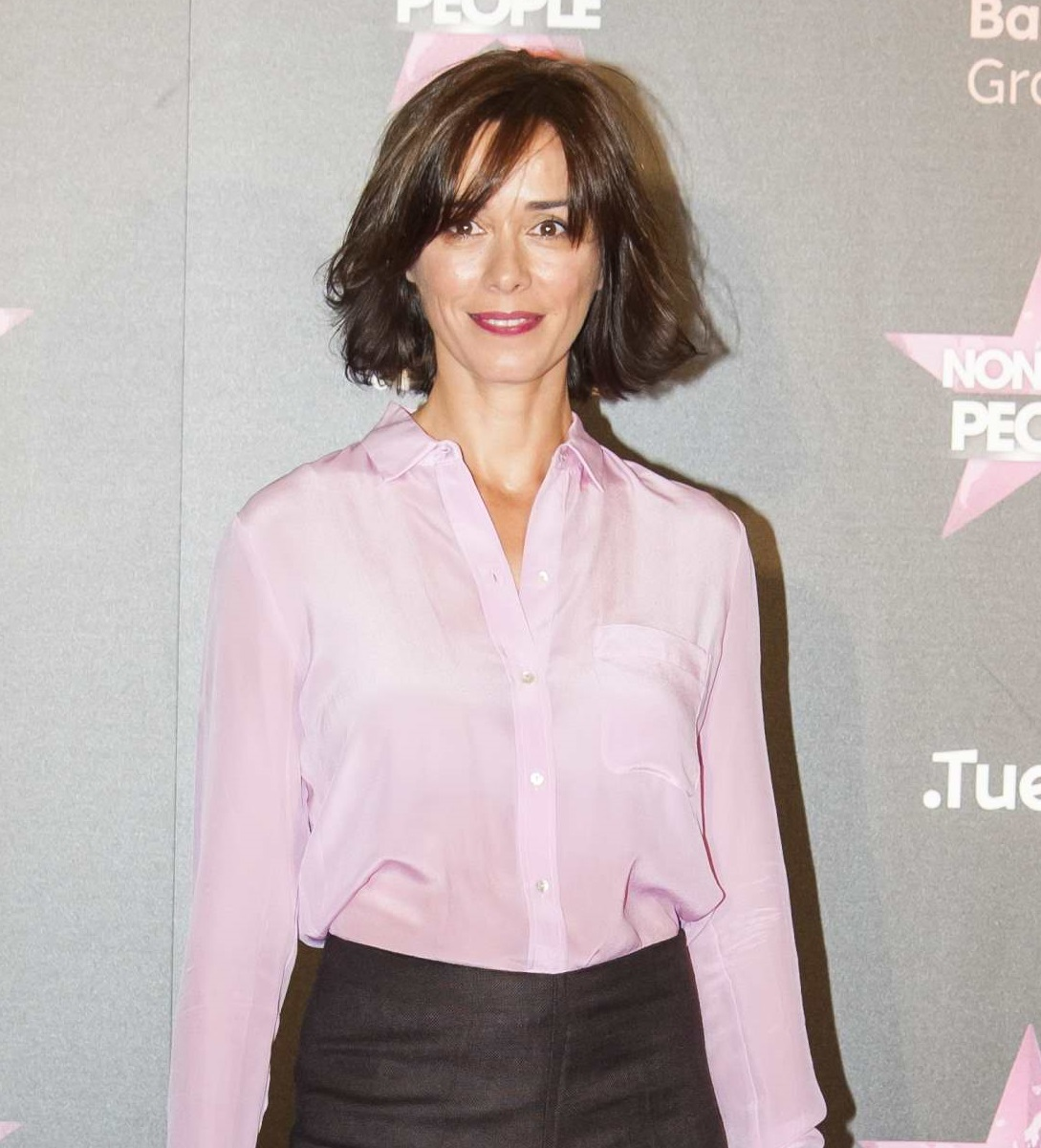
- Fanny Gautier in 2015
- Born: Fanny Solórzano Gautier; 21 November 1970 (age 55); Madrid, Spain
- Years active: 1997–present

Fanny Solórzano Gautier (born 21 November 1970, in Madrid, Spain) is a Spanish actress. She is famous for portraying Alicia Jauregi in the Spanish television series Un paso adelante, and in the films Abre los ojos, Elsa y Fred and La Torre de Suso.

== Personal life ==
Fanny was born to a Spanish father and French mother in Madrid. She is bilingual in Spanish and French. Fanny Solórzano Gautier has two children, twins, born in 2005.

== Filmography ==
=== Films ===
- Abre los ojos (1997)
- La Femme du Cosmonaute (1998)
- Grandes ocasiones (1998)
- Amor, curiosidad, prozak y dudas (2001)
- Mi casa es tu casa (2002)
- Elsa y Fred (2005)
- La Torre de Suso (2007)

=== Television ===
- Antivicio (2000)
- Pasión adolescente (2001)
- Un paso adelante (2002–2005)
- Policías, en el corazón de la calle (2002)
- 7 vidas (2003)
- Sin hogar (2003)
- Fuera de control (2006)
- Génesis, en la mente del asesino (2007)
- Olympo (2025)

=== Herself ===
- Pasapalabra (2003–2004)
- Channel nº 4 (2007)
