= Lorena Vindel =

Honduran actress and artist (born 1977)

- Born: 1977 (age 48–49); Tegucigalpa, Honduras
- Education: Universidad Nacional Autónoma de Honduras
- Occupations: Actress, artist

Lorena Vindel (born 1977) is a Honduran actress and artist.

== Biography ==
Lorena Vindel began her artistic training at the Experimental Children's Music School in Tegucigalpa, and continued it at the National School of Music. From 1996 to 1998, she studied art history at the Universidad Nacional Autónoma de Honduras. At the same time she performed at the Teatro Zambra. In 1998, she emigrated to Spain, where she continued her training with acting and musical studies. She started working as a theatrical actress and obtained supporting, extra, and double roles in Spanish films. In 2008, she won the Best New Actress award at the Toulouse Spanish Film Festival for her role in Seven Billiard Tables. In 2010, she won the lead role in the film Mami Blue, released in 2011.

In 2014, she returned to Honduras to create a performance art piece called Madre Tierra, inspired by biblical texts and local traditions.

== Awards ==
- 2008: Best New Actress at the Toulouse Spanish Film Festival

== Filmography ==
=== Television ===
Year	Title	Role	Notes
2004	¡Ay Adolfo!		Short
2004–2006	El comisario		2 episodes
2007	C.L.A. No somos ángeles	Mariela Mendía	65 episodes
2008	Susurros	Nana	Short; voice only
2008	Cuenta atrás	Celia	1 episode
2009	El porvenir es largo	Evelyn	
2009	Hospital Central	Dalia Parrales	3 episodes

=== Film ===
Year	Title	Role	Notes
2007	Seven Billiard Tables	Evelin	
2011	Mami Blue	Luz Estela	
2011	Lo mejor de Eva	Wendy	
