= Nuria González =

Spanish actress and television presenter

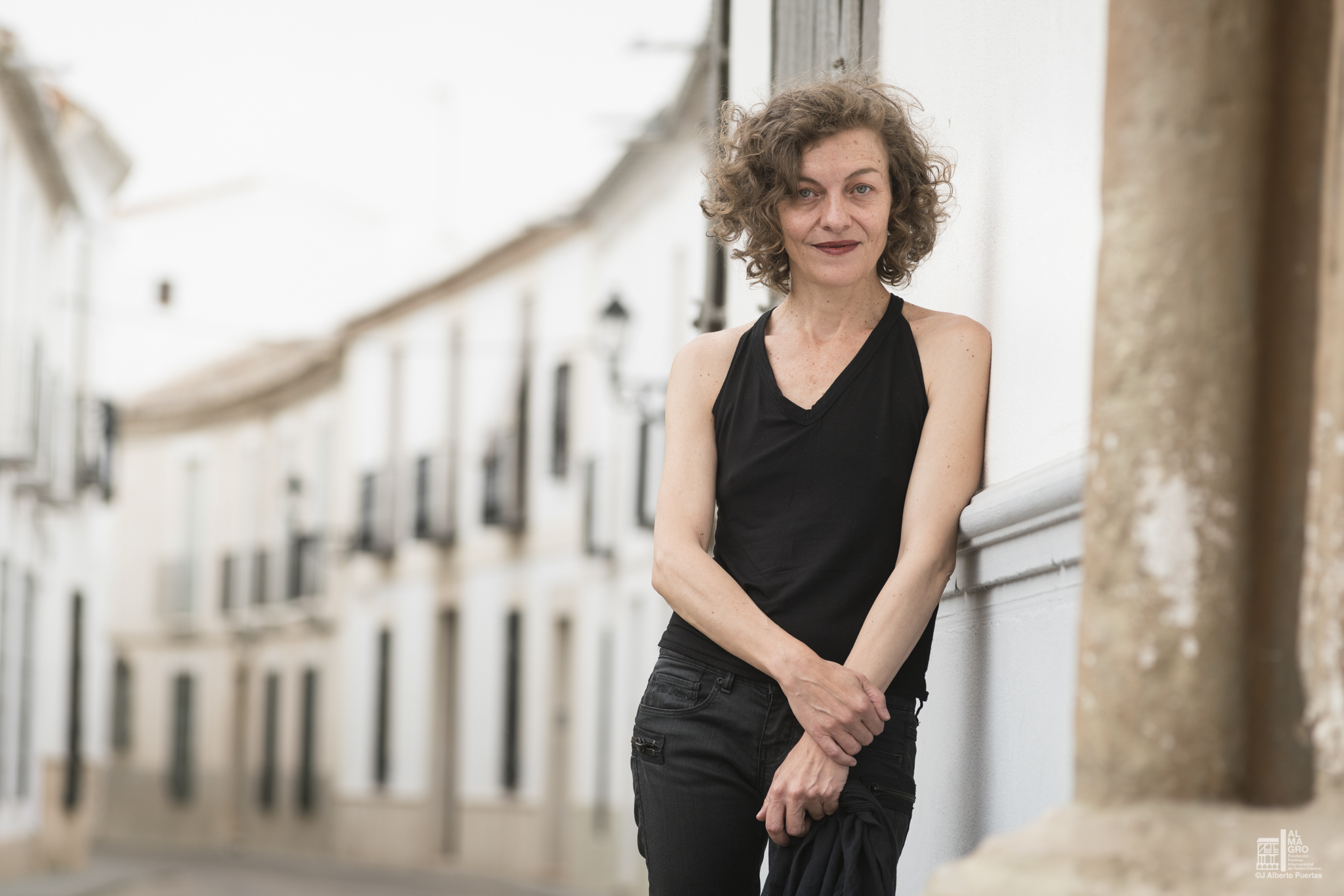
- Born: 16 May 1962 (age 63); Málaga, Spain
- Occupations: Actress; television presenter; stand-up comedian

Nuria González (born 16 May 1962) is a Spanish actress. She became popular to a television audience for her performances in series such as Manos a la obra, Los Serrano and Física o Química.

== Life and career ==
Nuria González was born on 16 May 1962 in Málaga. She earned early public recognition to a television audience in Spain by appearing in the late night show Esta noche cruzamos el Mississippi (as the transvestite Ramón) as well as featuring in the series Manos a la obra and Los Serrano. She also featured in the series El botones Sacarino.

In addition to her acting career, González has worked as a television presenter, hosting the Spain's version of the game show Weakest Link, which she quit in 2002, citing professional issues and physical exhaustion, focusing instead on her work in the theatre play 5mujeres.com, staged at the Teatro Alcázar. She too has intervened as a stand-up comedian in El club de la comedia.

She has been highlighted for deciding to drastically quit her roles in Manos a la obra (Adela) and Los Serrano (Candela), as well as later also Física o Química, at the height of all three popular series. She left Los Serrano in 2006. In 2005, González featured in a supporting role in Chus Gutiérrez's El Calentito, performing the role of Antonia, a trans woman and bar owner. Her work in the film earned her a Best New Performance award at the 8th Málaga Film Festival. She starred in the Icíar Bollaín's film Mataharis (2007) alongside Najwa Nimri and María Vázquez, portraying Carmen, a private investigator. Her performance clinched her a nomination to the Goya Award for Best Supporting Actress. She returned to television, featuring in teen drama series Física o química, portraying the role of Clara (the director of the high school where the fiction took place) from 2008 to 2010. In 2010, she also decided to quit the series to focus on her main acting activity on stage, although she has also featured afterwards in some television works, including her performances in the first season of Señoras del (h)AMPA and in 30 Coins.

== Filmography ==
=== Television ===
Year	Title	Character	Notes	Ref.
1998–2001	Manos a la obra	Adela	Main	
2000–2001	El botones Sacarino	Tatú	Main	
2002	Padre coraje	Prostituta alcohólica	Miniseries	
2003–2006	Los Serrano	Candela	Main	
2008–2010	Física o Química	Clara	Main	
2015	Rabia	Nieves	Main	
2018	Matar al padre	Mireia	4-part miniseries	
2019	Señoras del (h)AMPA	Begoña Cepeda	Main	
2021	30 monedas (30 Coins)	Salcedo	Recurring. Season 1	
2023	La red púrpura (The Purple Network)	Rocío Narváez		

=== Film ===
Year	Movie	Character	Notes	Ref.
1997	El amor perjudica seriamente la salud (Love Can Seriously Damage Your Health)			
1998	El milagro de P. Tinto (The Miracle of P. Tinto)	Madrastra		
2003	Torremolinos 73	Señora de Romerales		
2005	El Calentito	Antonia		
2006	Para entrar a vivir	Agente inmobiliaria	2007 TV movie part of the Películas para no dormir horror anthology. Premiered in Venice in 2006	
2007	Mataharis	Carmen		
2007	Pudor (Modesty)	Pilar		
2022	Llenos de gracia (Full of Grace)			

== Accolades ==
Year	Award	Category	Work	Result	Ref.
2005	8th Málaga Film Festival	AISGE Award for Best New Performance	El Calentito	Won	
2008	22nd Goya Awards	Best Supporting Actress	Mataharis	Nominated	
2008	17th Actors and Actresses Union Awards	Best Film Actress in a Secondary Role	Mataharis	Won	
2008	63rd CEC Medals	Best Supporting Actress	Mataharis	Nominated	
