= José Luis Torrijo =

Spanish actor (born 1967)

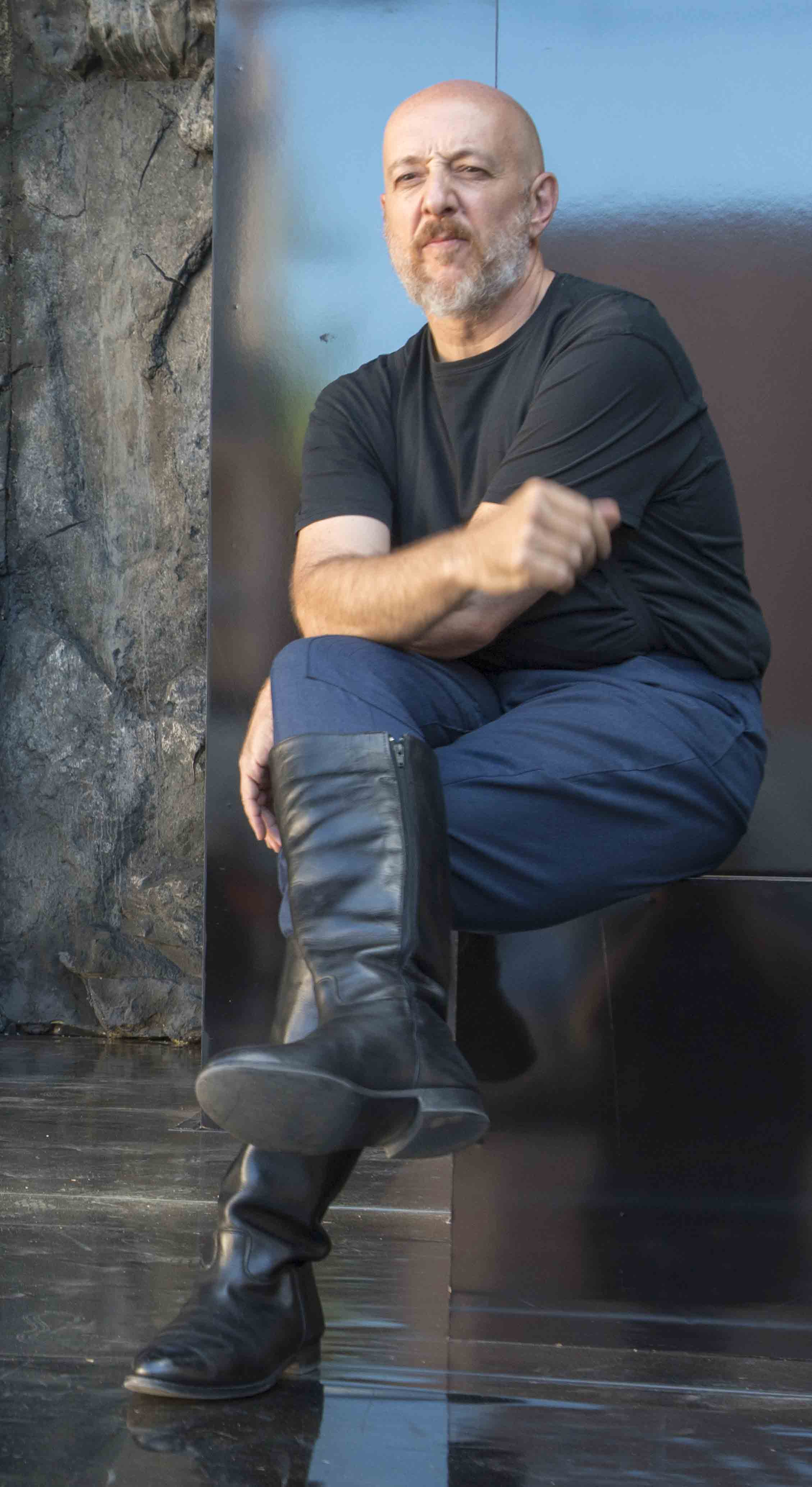
- (2019)
- Born: 9 February 1967 (age 59); San Sebastián, Gipuzkoa, Spain
- Occupation: Actor

José Luis Torrijo (born 9 February 1967) is a Spanish theatre, television and film actor. His most acclaimed film performance is his role in Solitary Fragments for which he won the Goya Award for Best New Actor.

== Biography ==
José Luis Torrijo was born on 9 February 1967 in San Sebastián.

A performer in numerous classical theatre plays, he participated in the Teatro de La Abadía. His stage credits include performances in plays of Fuente Ovejuna, Viaje del Parnaso, El sueño de una noche de verano, La Celestina (Sempronio), La amante inglesa, Blackbird, Bailar en la oscuridad.

He made his television debut in an episode of the series Canguros. His early film career was marked by minor roles in films such as Airbag, All About My Mother, The Devil's Backbone and Pan's Labyrinth. His performance in Jaime Rosales' film Solitary Fragments—in which he played the role of Pedro, the former husband of Adela (Sonia Almarcha)— earned him the Goya Award for Best New Actor at the 22nd Goya Awards.

== Filmography ==
=== Film ===
Year	Title	Role	Notes	Ref.
1997	Airbag			
1999	Todo sobre mi madre (All About My Mother)	Doctor		
2001	El espinazo del diablo (The Devil's Backbone)			
2002	El caballero Don Quijote (Don Quixote, Knight Errant)	Cura		
2003	Noviembre			
2006	El laberinto del fauno (Pan's Labyrinth)	Sargento Bayona		
2007	La soledad (Solitary Fragments)	Pedro		
2007	Ángeles S.A.			
2007	Uno de los dos no puede estar equivocado	Martín		
2008	Rivales			
2010	La herencia Valdemar (The Valdemar Legacy)	Dámaso		
2011	Lo mejor de Eva (Dark Impulse)	Carmelo		
2013	Los amantes pasajeros (I'm So Excited!)	Señor Mas		
2023	Que nadie duerma (Something Is About to Happen)	Santiago		

=== Television ===
Year	Title	Role	Notes	Ref.
2008	El comisario	Santos Marino	Main. Introduced in season 12	
2017	Amar es para siempre	Julián Azevedo	Main (since season 6)	

== Accolades ==
Year	Award	Category	Work	Result	Ref.
2008	22nd Goya Awards	Best New Actor	Solitary Fragments	Won	
2022	30th Actors and Actresses Union Awards	Best Stage Actor in a Minor Role	Nápoles millonaria	Nominated	
2026	34th Actors and Actresses Union Awards	Best Stage Actor in a Secondary Role	Los lunes al sol	Pending	
