= A Widow's Game =

2025 Spanish crime drama film

- Theatrical release poster
- Spanish: La viuda negra
- Directed by: Carlos Sedes
- Starring: Ivana Baquero; Tristán Ulloa; Carmen Machi
- Cinematography: Daniel Sosa
- Production company: Bambú Producciones
- Distributed by: Netflix
- Release date: 30 May 2025
- Running time: 122 minutes
- Country: Spain
- Language: Spanish

A Widow's Game (Spanish: La viuda negra) is a 2025 Spanish crime drama film directed by Carlos Sedes based on the so-called crime of Patraix. It stars Ivana Baquero, Tristán Ulloa, and Carmen Machi.

== Plot ==
The plot is based on the murder of the engineer Antonio Navarro Cerdán, stabbed to death in a garage of Patraix (Valencia) on 16 August 2017. The widow, nurse 'Maje', and the latter's lover and workmate, Salva Rodrigo are convicted as murderers.

A police officer, Eva, is assigned to a homicide case. A man, Arturo, whose body is not shown, was discovered in a parking lot, having several stab wounds. It is stated that he was likely taken by surprise by a strong male attacker. Arturo's wife/widow Maria (referred to as 'Maje', who works at a hospital as a nurse) shows up with some coworker, appearing extremely grieved by the incident. The police quickly suspect Maje and some man as the likely suspects after some investigating.

It is shown that Maje cheated on Arturo with a man named Andre before the marriage, yet he forgave her. Maje's friend says that Arturo is very controlling, likely due to this infidelity incident. Eva's coworkers guessed that Maje is a nymphomaniac, but Eva disagrees, thinking she simply wants attention or to control men.

(Side note, one of Eva's colleagues is shot in the line of duty when investigating a separate case. The end of the film notes that it is dedicated to that police officer. Other statements note developments after Salva and Maje go to jail. He recants taking sole responsibility for Arturo's death and receives a lighter sentence because of cooperating with the police.)

After the police tap her cellphone, they learn that Maje has a double life. Via flashbacks, it's shown that at home/in public, she had acted at parties and is very promiscuous, having sex with several people on a regular basis, including a coworker, and a man named Daniel whom she met at a party. Due to all this, Arturo gets suspicious of her behavior, which leads to several arguments. After seeing a message from Daniel on Maje's phone, Arturo snaps and tells her to leave the house.

Maje complains about Arturo to all her lovers, claims that he is abusing her, and says she wishes Arturo was dead.

She gets involved with Salva, a coworker who is a married man in his 40s. She seduces him and asks him if he will kill Arturo for her. Salva also works at the hospital, and is married to another nurse.

Maje is gradually revealed as an emotional vampire with sociopathic behaviors. She collects men by seducing them to get attention or use them, whether it's because of insecurity, ego, or rebelling from her strict religious background. She starts to manipulate Salva, saying that he doesn't truly understand or love her, trying to push him into killing Arturo.

Maje plans the place to attack Arturo, and sets it up with Salva. He has shown her how competent he is, by doing repairs at her place. Salva has told a couple of his friends about Maje, and how infatutated he is.

After the murder, Maje says they shouldn't see each other for a while. Salva starts to have doubts about Maje and whether she loves him. He is resentful when he learns she is seeing Daniel, instead of him. He retreats and takes a break from their relationship, and Maje tries to kerp him under her control.

Eva manipulates it so that Arturo's family tells Maje that they are close to catching the killer, and know exactly who the culprit is. Her plan works perfectly, as it causes Maje to freak out, and she calls Salva. When he doesn't pick up, she resorts to pinning it all on Salva, saying he was obsessed with her.

The police slowly piece together all the clues, phone calls, evidence, and more. Eva arrests Salva and Maje, and they are taken to court to be prosecuted for their crimes.

Footage of the real court case the story is based on is played at the end. The film also explains what happened to each character in the real life story, and honors the fallen officer from earlier.

== Cast ==
- Ivana Baquero as Maje
- Tristán Ulloa as Salva Rodrigo
- Carmen Machi as Eva
- Joel Sánchez as Daniel
- Álex Gadea as Antonio
- Pablo Molinero as Turrientes
- Pepe Ocio as Bernardo
- Ramón Ródenas as Javier Gil
- Amparo Fernández
- Miquel Mars

== Production ==
The film is a Bambú Producciones production. Daniel Sosa lensed the film. Shooting locations included Valencia.

== Release ==
Netflix released the film on 30 May 2025.

== Reception ==
Jose Madrid of El Confidencial rated the film 3½ out of 5 stars, declaring it "accessible and pacey, addictive throughout its two hours and faithful (perhaps too much so) to the real event it portrays".

John Serba of Decider.com declared the film "a slightly-better-than-middling drama, professionally executed from a technical standpoint but a bit thin of screenplay".

== Viewership ==
According to data from Showlabs, A Widow's Game ranked tenth on Netflix in the United States during the week of 2–8 June 2025.

== See also ==
- List of Spanish films of 2025
