= Tristán Ulloa =

Spanish actor, writer, director (b. 1970)

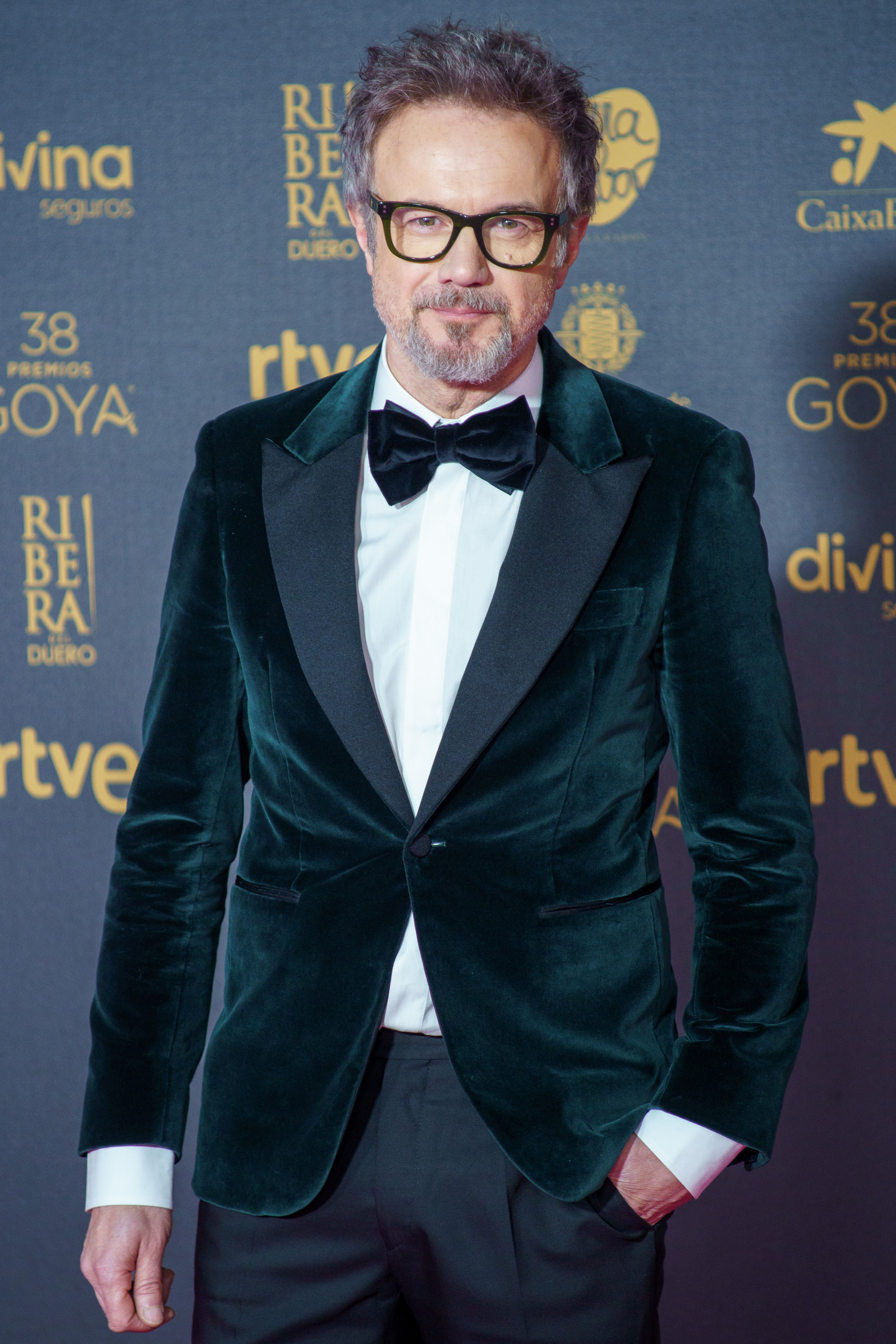
- Ulloa in 2024
- Born: 6 May 1970 (age 56); Orléans, France
- Education: Lycée Français de Madrid
- Occupations: Actor; writer; director
- Years active: 1995–present

Tristán Ulloa (born 6 May 1970) is a Spanish actor, writer, and director.

== Career ==
Tristán Ulloa was born in Orléans, France, and soon moved to Madrid, Spain, where he spent his early childhood. At age 12, he moved to Vigo, Galicia. His mother, Esther San Román, lives in Hortaleza, Madrid as of 2005. Ulloa graduated from the Lycée Français de Madrid.

He has appeared in numerous films such as Sex and Lucía (2001).

On 18 March 2019, it was announced that Ulloa was cast as Father Vincent in the Netflix fantasy series, Warrior Nun. In December 2023, Ulloa featured in Berlin.

== Filmography ==
=== Film ===
Year	Title	Role	Notes	Ref.
1997	Memorias del ángel caído	Alberto	Feature film debut	
1997	Abre los ojos (Open Your Eyes)	Camarero ('waiter')		
1998	Mensaka, páginas de una historia (Mensaka)	Javi		
1999	Rewind	Pablo		
1999	Los sin nombre (The Nameless)	Quiroga		
1999	Marta y alrededores (Marta and Surroundings)	Julio		
2000	Pleure pas Germaine	Miguel		
2000	Km. 0	Mario		
2001	Lucía y el sexo (Sex and Lucia)	Lorenzo		
2002	No debes estar aquí (You Shouldn't Be Here)	Sergio		
2002	Volverás (You'll Be Back)	Carlos		
2003	El lápiz del carpintero (The Carpenter's Pencil)	Daniel da Barca		
2003	Las voces de la noche (Voices in the Night)	Jorge		
2004	El juego de la verdad (The Truth and Other Lies)	Ernesto		
2005	Maroa	Joaquín		
2006	Salvador	Oriol Arau		
2006	El destino (Destiny)	Pedro		
2007	Mataharis	Iñaki		
2007	Pudor (Modesty)	—N/a	Co-director and screenwriter	
2009	After	Manuel		
2009	The Frost	Raúl		
2009	Un buen hombre (A Good Man)	Vicente		
2010	Un lugar lejano (A Distant Place)	Roque		
2010	Que se mueran los feos (To Hell with the Ugly)	Abel		
2012	Astérix & Obélix : Au service de Sa Majesté (Asterix and Obelix: God Save Britannia)			
2013	Gente en sitios (People in Places)			
2014	Le Dernier Coup de marteau (The Last Hammer Blow)			
2015	Altamira	Henri Breuil		
2016	Crash test Aglaé			.
2019	Terminator: Dark Fate	Felipe Gandal		
2022	Stoyan	Israel		
2025	Romería	Lois		
2025	La viuda negra (A Widow's Game)	Salva		

=== Television ===
Year	Title	Role	Notes	Ref.
1996	Canguros			
1998	Más que amigos	Julio		
1998	La vida en el aire	Álex		
2000	El comisario	Julio Ponce		
2005	D'Artagnan et les Trois Mousquetaires	Louis XIII		
2005	Diario de un skin	Antonio Salas	TV movie	
2009	Otra ciudad	Rafa	TV movie	
2009	Muchachada Nui	Miembro Iglesia de la Cosmología		
2010–13	Gran Reserva	Miguel Cortázar		
2013	El tiempo entre costuras (The Time in Between)	Juan Luis Beigbeder		
2015	Los nuestros	Iñaki	TV miniseries	
2017	Narcos	Ernesto Samper	Season 3	
2018	Snatch	Mayor Ortega		
2020–22	Warrior Nun	Father Vincent		
2021	La caza. Tramuntana	Ángel		
2023	La casa de papel: Berlín (Money Heist: Berlin)	Damián		
2024	El caso Asunta (The Asunta Case)	Alfonso Basterra		
2025	El Centro	Enrique Adaro		
2026	El crimen de pazos	Elias		
2026	Lobo			

== Accolades ==
Year	Award	Category	Work	Result	Ref.
1999	13th Goya Awards	Best New Actor	Mensaka	Nominated	
2002	16th Goya Awards	Best Actor	Sex and Lucia	Nominated	
2004	46th Ariel Awards	Best Supporting Actor	You'll Be Back	Nominated	
2008	22nd Goya Awards	Best Actor	Mataharis	Nominated	
2008	22nd Goya Awards	Best New Director	Modesty	Nominated	
2008	22nd Goya Awards	Best Adapted Screenplay	Modesty	Nominated	
2014	23rd Actors and Actresses Union Awards	Best Television Actor in a Minor Role	The Time in Between	Won	
2025	12th Feroz Awards	Best Main Actor in a Series	The Asunta Case	Nominated	
2025	33rd Actors and Actresses Union Awards	Best Television Actor in a Leading Role	The Asunta Case	Nominated	
2026	34th Actors and Actresses Union Awards	Best Film Actor in a Secondary Role	Romería	Nominated	
