= Querida Bamako =

- Directed by: Omer Oke, Txarli Llorente
- Screenplay by: Joanes Urkixo
- Produced by: Abraprod S.L.
- Starring: Djédjé Apali, Esther Vallés, Gorsy Edu
- Cinematography: Gaizka Bourgeaud
- Edited by: Iván Miñambres, Haritz Zubillaga
- Music by: Pascal Gaigne
- Release date: October 19, 2007
- Running time: 98 minutes
- Country: Spain

Querida Bamako is a 2007 Spanish film.

== Synopsis ==
Moussa is a young boy from Burkina Faso. He was born and lives in the same village as his parents, his family and his wife, Fatima, although he prefers to call her "Bamako", as he met her there, in the capital of Mali, before they got married and had their baby, Mamadou. Although the land gives them enough to live on, the precarious balance has been upset by a long drought. Driven by the need to feed his family, and having asked the elders’ advice, Moussa decides to emigrate to Europe.
