= The Orphanage (2007 film) =

2007 Gothic supernatural horror film by J. A. Bayona

- Spanish release poster
- Spanish: El orfanato
- Directed by: J. A. Bayona
- Screenplay by: Sergio G. Sánchez
- Produced by: Mar Targarona; Joaquín Padró; Álvaro Augustin
- Starring: Belén Rueda; Fernando Cayo; Roger Príncep; Mabel Rivera; Montserrat Carulla; Andrés Gertrúdix; Edgar Vivar; Geraldine Chaplin
- Cinematography: Óscar Faura
- Edited by: Elena Ruiz
- Music by: Fernando Velázquez
- Production companies: Rodar y Rodar; Telecinco Cinema
- Distributed by: Warner Bros. Pictures Spain
- Release dates: 20 May 2007 (Cannes); 10 September 2007 (Spain)
- Running time: 97 minutes
- Countries: Spain; Mexico
- Language: Spanish
- Budget: €4.5 million
- Box office: €78 million

The Orphanage (Spanish: El orfanato) is a 2007 Gothic supernatural horror film directed by J. A. Bayona in his directorial full-length debut. The film stars Belén Rueda as Laura, Fernando Cayo as her husband, Carlos, and Roger Príncep as their adopted son Simón. The plot centers on Laura, who returns to her childhood home, an orphanage. Laura plans to turn the house into a home for disabled children, but after an argument with Simón, he goes missing. The film is an international co-production between Spain and Mexico.

The film's script was written by Sergio G. Sánchez in 1996 and brought to the attention of Bayona in 2004. Bayona asked his long-time friend, director Guillermo del Toro, to help produce the film and to double its budget and filming time. Bayona wanted the film to capture the feel of 1970s Spanish cinema; he cast Geraldine Chaplin and Belén Rueda, who were later praised for their roles in the film.

The film opened at the Cannes Film Festival on 20 May 2007, where it received a standing ovation lasting more than 10 minutes. It received domestic critical acclaim in Spain, and won seven Goya awards, including Original Screenplay and New Director. On its North American release, The Orphanage was praised by English-speaking critics, who described the film as well directed and well acted, and noted the film's lack of "cheap scares". New Line Cinema subsequently bought the rights to the film for an American remake. It is widely regarded as a modern classic of the genre and of Spanish and Mexican cinema.

== Plot ==
In Spain, a young girl named Laura García Rodríguez is adopted from an orphanage. Thirty years later, adult Laura returns to the closed orphanage, accompanied by her husband, Carlos Sánchez Rivera, and their seven-year-old son, Simón. She plans to reopen the orphanage as a facility for disabled children. Simón claims to have befriended a boy named Tomás, and draws pictures of him as a child wearing a sack mask. Social worker Benigna Escobedo visits the house to inquire after Simón, and it is revealed that Laura and Carlos adopted Simón and that he is HIV-positive. Incensed at Benigna's intrusion, Laura asks her to leave. Later that night, Laura finds Benigna in the orphanage's coal shed, but Benigna flees the scene. Later, Simón teaches Laura a game which grants its winner a wish. Clues lead the two to Simón's adoption file. Simón becomes angry, and says that his new friend told him that Laura is not his biological mother and that he is going to die soon.

During a party for the orphanage's opening, Laura and Simón argue, and Simón hides from her after she slaps him across the face in a fit of frustration, which she immediately regrets. While looking for him, she encounters a child wearing a sack mask who shoves her into a bathroom and locks her inside. When Laura escapes, she realizes that Simón is missing and is unable to find him. That night, Laura hears several loud crashes within the walls of the orphanage. Police psychologist Pilar suggests to Laura and Carlos that Benigna may have abducted Simón.

Six months later, Simón is still missing. While searching for him, Laura spots Benigna (pushing a doll in a pram), who is then struck and killed by an ambulance. The police find evidence that Benigna worked at the orphanage, and that she had a son named Tomás, who also lived there but was kept hidden due to his facial deformity (with Laura seeing old footage of Tomás being made to remove his mask, presenting his face to the camera). A few weeks after Laura was adopted, the orphans stole the mask that Tomás wore to conceal his deformed face and damaged eye. Embarrassed, Tomás refused to leave his hiding place in a nearby sea cave, and the rising tide drowned him.

Laura asks for the assistance of a medium named Aurora in the search for Simón. Aurora conducts a séance during which she claims to see the ghosts of the orphans crying for help. Laura discovers the remains of the orphans she grew up with in the orphanage. Benigna poisoned their meals and killed them for having caused Tomás's death and hid their remains in the orphanage's coal shed. Unable to cope with the situation, Carlos leaves the orphanage.

Laura makes the orphanage look as it did thirty years prior and attempts to contact the children's spirits by playing one of their old games. The spirits lead her to the door of a hidden underground room. Inside is Simón's corpse, wearing Tomás' mask. Laura finally realizes what happened: while searching for Simón the night he disappeared, Laura moved pieces of construction scaffolding, blocking the entrance to the secret room. The crashes that night were caused by Simón trying to get out. He fell and fatally broke his neck (when he was knocked back by something ramming the secret door while he was standing by it).

Laura appears to take an overdose of sleeping pills. Then, apparently dying, she begs to be with Simón again and the children's spirits appear (including an unmasked Tomás finally coming in to join the rest, no longer shy over his looks), with Simón among them. Simón tells Laura that his wish was for her to stay and take care of the orphans; she then happily tells them a story (as Tomás makes the others sit down next to him to listen). Sometime later, Carlos visits a memorial to Laura, Simón and the orphans. Carlos returns to the orphans' old bedroom and finds a medallion that he had instructed Laura to return when she found Simón. He turns to look as the door opens, and he smiles.

== Cast ==
- Belén Rueda as Laura García Rodríguez, the wife of Carlos and adoptive mother of Simón. Laura returns to the orphanage where she spent some of her youth to turn it into a home for disabled children. Mireia Renau portrays the younger Laura.
- Fernando Cayo as Carlos Sánchez Rivera, the husband of Laura and adoptive father of Simón.
- Roger Príncep as Simón Sánchez Rivera, the young adopted son of Laura and Carlos. Simón meets new imaginary friends in the orphanage and eventually threatens to run away with them.
- Mabel Rivera as Pilar, the head police psychologist who eventually discovers the truth of who Benigna really is.
- Montserrat Carulla as Benigna Escobedo, a former worker at the orphanage who identifies herself as a social worker. When she is seen young in the film, she is portrayed by Carol Suárez. Production companies working with Bayona tried to urge him to keep this character alive until the end of the film.
- Geraldine Chaplin as Aurora, the medium brought in to help find Simón when the police can't find him.
- Andrés Gertrúdix as Enrique, Aurora's sound technician.
- Édgar Vivar as Professor Leo Balabán, a parapsychology expert who puts Laura in contact with Aurora and directs the spirit session in her house.
- Óscar Casas as Tomás, the deformed, one-eyed son of Benigna, now a ghost, who Simón claims to have befriended.

== Production ==
=== Development ===
This was an international co-production film between Spain and Mexico. The first draft of the script of The Orphanage was written by Sergio G. Sánchez in 1996. Sánchez was not sure why he chose to write a genre film for the screenplay, as he explains, "I ended up writing a film in the style of those I liked as a kid, movies like Poltergeist, The Omen, and Rosemary's Baby which I ruined on the first VCR we owned at home." Sánchez revealed the literary influences underlying his writing of the script, such as The Turn of the Screw and Peter Pan. Sánchez originally wanted to direct the script but he was repeatedly turned down by various Spanish production companies. While Sánchez was working on the short film 7337 in 2004, he met with director Juan Antonio Bayona and offered him the script to direct. Bayona accepted the opportunity because he felt that a fantasy themed script like that of The Orphanage would allow him freedom as a director, saying the fantasy genre was a great tool for learning as it "allows manipulation of space and time as we wish or the use of certain camera moves with an immediate efficiency".

Bayona cut parts of the script, including the outcome of the other orphanage children, because he wanted to focus on the character of Laura and what happens to her. To create the film as he wanted, Bayona had to double both the film's budget and the amount of filming time. To accomplish this, Bayona received help from fellow film director Guillermo del Toro, whom he had met at Festival de Cine de Sitges when del Toro was presenting his film Cronos (1993). Del Toro offered to co-produce the film as soon as he learned about it. For the rest of his crew, Bayona worked with his regular team that he worked with on commercials and music videos.

=== Casting ===
During casting discussions between Bayona and del Toro, Bayona expressed a desire to see Belén Rueda in the lead. Bayona admired her after seeing her performance as Julia in Alejandro Amenabar's The Sea Inside. Del Toro appreciated this choice, as he admired her as an actress and liked that Bayona was casting her against type. Bayona asked Rueda to watch The Innocents and Close Encounters of the Third Kind to prepare for the role. Another actress Bayona desired for the film was Geraldine Chaplin in the role of Aurora, the medium. Bayona stated that he wanted the film to have "the mood of 70s Spanish cinema and Geraldine starred in one of the best movies of that decade, Carlos Saura's Cría Cuervos, as the ghost of the mother. It made sense to have her play the medium." Bayona was nervous about filming with Chaplin. To break that tension, on the first day of shooting with her, Bayona hid under a bed during a scene which required Chaplin to portray Aurora kneeling down near it in the dark, and he grabbed Chaplin's leg when she did so. Aurora's scream in the film is Chaplin's actual frightened scream as Bayona grabbed her. Roger Príncep's test-screening was one of the first for the role of Simón. Bayona test-screened over four-hundred children during two months before making his choice to cast Princep. Edgar Vivar was cast in role of Balabán; Bayona knew him through his work on the Mexican television series El Chavo and sent him an invitation for the role through e-mail.

=== Filming ===
Production on The Orphanage began on May 15, 2006, in Llanes, Asturias. This location was chosen due to the area's diverse natural settings that include beaches, caves, cliffs, forests, a small village, and the Partarríu Manor where the orphanage scenes take place. The orphanage was an old colonial house from the end of the nineteenth century. Bayona wanted to use certain cinematographic techniques that were impossible to achieve in the house, so several parts of the house were reconstructed in sound stages. After four weeks in Llanes, the team moved to Barcelona to finish up the last ten weeks of filming in sound stages, making over 80% of the film there. Bayona showed the films La residencia and The Innocents to his director of photography on the film, to make special notice of the Scope lensing used in both films.

== Release ==
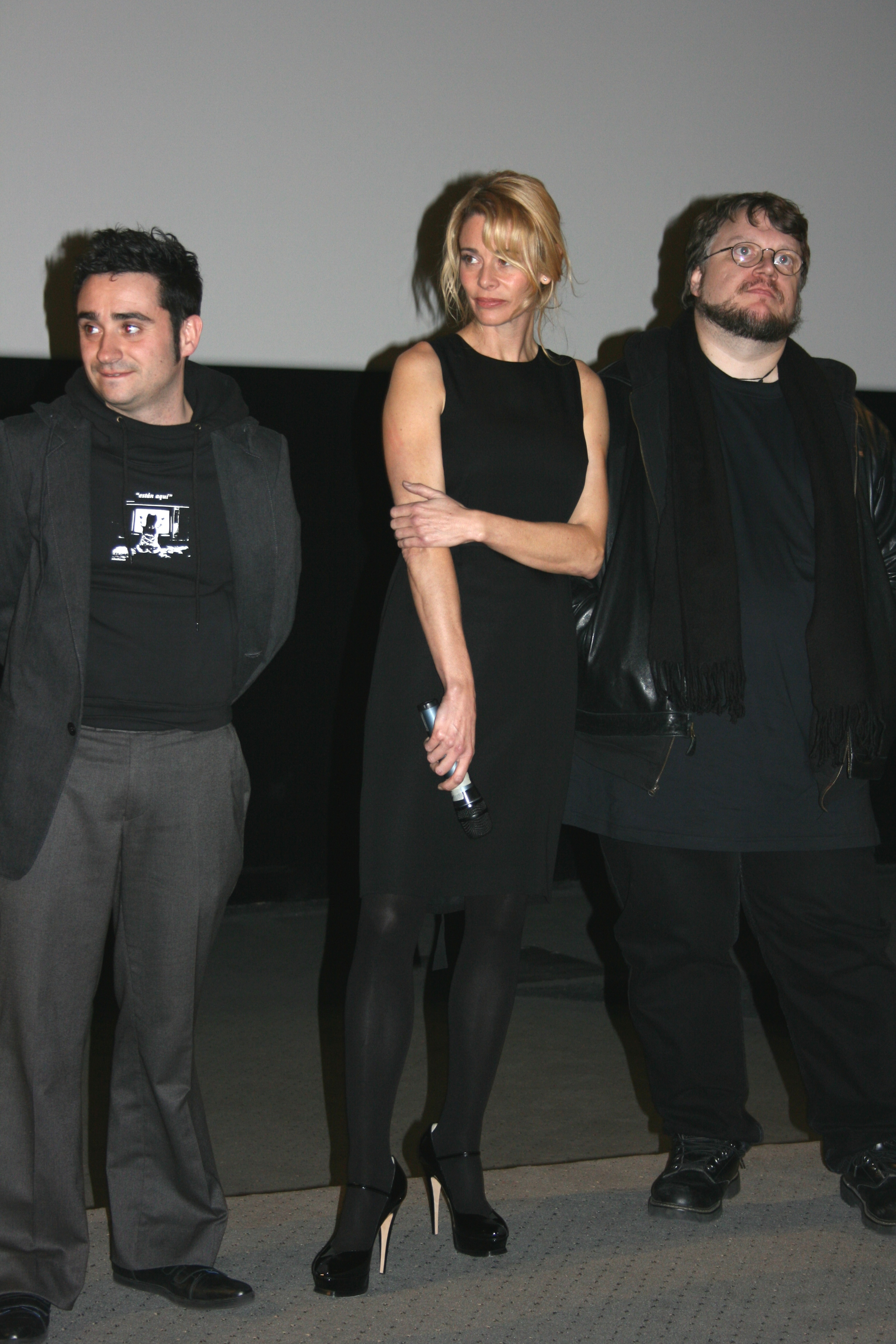
Juan Antonio Bayona, Belén Rueda and Guillermo del Toro at a French premiere of The Orphanage in Paris on January 28, 2008.

The Orphanage premiered at the Cannes Film Festival on May 20, 2007. The film was positively received with a ten-minute ovation from the audience. The film's Spanish debut took place at the Sitges Film Festival on October 4, 2007, where it opened the festival. The Orphanage premiered in Spain on September 10, 2007. The Orphanage was released in Spain on September 10, 2007 and was successful, with a €5.875 million four-day opening from 350 screens. The film was the second highest-grossing debut ever for a Spanish film and was the biggest opening of the year, making it even larger than the worldwide success of the Spanish-Mexican film Pan's Labyrinth. It opened in limited release in the United States on December 28, 2007, and had a wide release on January 11, 2008. It opened in Mexico on January 25, 2008, and earned over $11,000,000 at the box office.

In Spain, the film was nominated for 14 Goya Awards, including Best Picture and ended up winning awards for Best Art Direction, Best Director of Production, Best Makeup and Hair, Best New Director, Best Screenplay – Original, Best Sound Mixing, and Best Special Effects. The Orphanage was chosen by the Spanish Academy of Films as Spain's nominee for the 2007 Academy Award for Best Foreign Film, but ultimately did not end up as one of the five final nominees in that category. The Orphanage was picked up by Picturehouse at the Berlin Film Festival for American distribution.

In Iran, the film won Crystal Simorgh for Best Director at the "Seeking the Truth" section of the 27th Fajr International Film Festival.

=== Home media ===
The Orphanage was released on DVD and Blu-ray on April 22, 2008, for a Region 1 release by New Line Cinema. Both discs featured the same bonus features. A Region 2 version was released on DVD by Optimum Releasing on July 21, 2008.

=== Remake ===
In 2007, New Line Cinema bought the rights to produce an English-language remake with Guillermo del Toro as producer. On remakes, director Bayona noted that "The Americans have all the money in the world but can't do anything, while we can do whatever we want but don't have the money" and "The American industry doesn't take chances, that's why they make remakes of movies that were already big hits". On August 4, 2009, Larry Fessenden was announced as the director of the American remake.

Fessenden later announced that he would not be involved with directing the remake, stating "Working on the script with Guillermo was a very exciting experience, but then I got into a casting miasma and that's where the thing is; I think they're gonna do it another way, actually. So I think I'm out of it. Hopefully they'll still use my script, but I'm not sure I'm directing it anymore". In January 2010, Mark Pellington replaced Larry Fessenden as director of the project.

On August 5, 2011, Guillermo del Toro stated that the remake would reflect his original vision for the film, and that it had been planned even when the first version was in production. "Even when we produced the Spanish movie, I had intended to remake it because we had a very different screenplay that, because of money and time, got turned into the movie you saw – which is great, but there was this other structure for the original script that I wanted to try. So even before we shot the first film it was an economic decision, a pre-existing creative decision, to change it." Del Toro also praised the new film's director. "We have Mark Pellington attached as director – I'm a big fan of his The Mothman Prophecies and his video work – and we are out to actors, so we're hoping to get things going soon."

On August 30, 2011, it was reported that American actress Amy Adams was in talks to star as Laura, the main character, who was played by Belén Rueda in the original film. It was also stated that the current incarnation of the remake screenplay had been written by Larry Fessenden and Sergio G. Sánchez, the sole writer of the original film.

By August 2021, Fessenden said that once he left, the project was shelved indefinitely. He added that "...the clock just ran out. I couldn’t land an actress of the caliber they had hoped for."

== Reception ==
=== Critical response ===
The Orphanage was received very well by American critics on its original release. The film has an 87% approval rating on Rotten Tomatoes based on 181 reviews, with an average rating of 7.4/10. The critical consensus reads, "Deeply unnerving and surprisingly poignant, The Orphanage is an atmospheric, beautifully crafted haunted house horror film that earns scares with a minimum of blood." At Metacritic, the film has received an average score of 74 out of 100, based on 33 reviews from mainstream critics, indicating "generally favorable reviews".

Critics praised the film for its lack of cheap scares. Film critic for the Chicago Sun Times Roger Ebert approved of the film claiming it to be "deliberately aimed at viewers with developed attention spans. It lingers to create atmosphere, a sense of place, a sympathy with the characters, instead of rushing into cheap thrills". Bill Goodykoontz of the Arizona Republic echoed this statement noting, "Bayona never lets The Orphanage descend into cheap horror. The scares here are expertly done and, placed in the context of Laura's state of mind, well-earned, perhaps even explainable (or not)." Peter Howell of the Toronto Star wrote, "The year's best horror picture is also one of the simplest. The Orphanage makes little if any use of digital tricks to present its numerous terrors." The casting of Chaplin and Rueda was praised while the role of Carlos was called dull. Goodykoontz noted the role of Carlos, saying "Cayo is rather pedestrian as Carlos, but he isn't given that much to do". Michael Phillips of the Chicago Tribune shared this opinion saying, "Rueda has a great pair of peepers for this assignment. When she looks one way and then the other, while skulking through the hallways of her childhood home, every nerve-wracking whatwasthat? registers, and how. Cayo is pretty dull by comparison, but Chaplin certainly is not." Liam Lacey of The Globe and Mail praised Rueda stating, "The strongest appeal of the film is the brooding, intense performance by Spanish actress, Belen Rueda."

A negative review came from Lacey of The Globe and Mail, who felt that at "[the film's] core, it seems intended as a sympathetic drama of a bereaved mother, who may have slipped into madness. What's even more disquieting is the persistent undercurrent of exploitation – the mixture of grief and jarring shock effects and the pitiless use of a disfigured child as a source of horror." A. O. Scott of The New York Times claimed the film to be a "diverting, overwrought ghost story" and that it "relies on basic and durable horror movie techniques". Jack Matthews of New York Daily News found the ending of the film to be one of the worst of the season, but praised the acting of Belén Rueda.

The Orphanage listed as one of the top 10 best films of 2007 by several critics, including Lawrence Toppman of the Charlotte Observer, Marc Doyle of Metacritic and Tasha Robinson of The A.V. Club. Anthony Lane of The New Yorker included the film on his top ten list of 2008. In the early 2010s, Time Out conducted a poll with several authors, directors, actors and critics who have worked within the horror genre to vote for their top horror films. The Orphanage placed at number 76 on their top 100 list.

=== Accolades ===
Year	Award	Category	Nominee(s)	Result	Ref.
2008	22nd Goya Awards	Best Film		Nominated	
2008	22nd Goya Awards	Best Actress	Belén Rueda	Nominated	
2008	22nd Goya Awards	Best Supporting Actress	Geraldine Chaplin	Nominated	
2008	22nd Goya Awards	Best Original Screenplay	Sergio G. Sánchez	Won	
2008	22nd Goya Awards	Best New Actor	Roger Príncep	Nominated	
2008	22nd Goya Awards	Best New Director	J. A. Bayona	Won	
2008	22nd Goya Awards	Best Editing	Elena Ruiz	Nominated	
2008	22nd Goya Awards	Best Art Direction	Josep Rosell	Won	
2008	22nd Goya Awards	Best Production Supervision	Sandra Hermida	Won	
2008	22nd Goya Awards	Best Sound	Xavi Mas, Marc Orts, Oriol Tarragó	Won	
2008	22nd Goya Awards	Best Special Effects	David Martí, Montse Ribé, Pau Costa, Enric Masip, Lluís Castells, Jordi San Agustín	Won	
2008	22nd Goya Awards	Best Costume Design	María Reyes	Nominated	
2008	22nd Goya Awards	Best Makeup and Hairstyles	Lola López, Itziar Arrieta	Won	
2008	22nd Goya Awards	Best Original Score	Fernando Velázquez	Nominated	
2008	17th Actors and Actresses Union Awards	Best Film Actress in a Leading Role	Belén Rueda	Nominated	
2008	17th Actors and Actresses Union Awards	Best Film Actress in a Minor Role	Geraldine Chaplin	Won	
2008	13th Forqué Awards	Best Film		Won	
2008	21st European Film Awards	Best European Film		Nominated	
2008	21st European Film Awards	Best European Actress	Belén Rueda	Nominated	
2008	21st European Film Awards	Best European Cinematographer	Óscar Faura	Nominated	
2008	21st European Film Awards	Best European Composer	Fernando Velázquez	Nominated	
2009	57th Silver Condor Awards	Best Ibero-American Film		Nominated	

== Soundtrack ==
El Orfanato

Film score by Fernando Velázquez
- Released: 2007
- Recorded: 2006
- Genre: Film music
- Length: 47:24
- Label: Rhino

In 2007, the film score was composed by Fernando Velázquez and released on compact disc by Rhino Records in Spain. The score for the film was nominated for film awards including the Goya Award for Best Score. The soundtrack has not been released locally in North America or the United Kingdom and is only available by import.

=== Track listing ===
All music is composed by Fernando Velázquez.

Track list
No.	Title	Length
1.	"Prólogo"	2:32
2.	"Créditos"	1:07
3.	"Una luz mágica"	1:22
4.	"El juego del tesoro"	1:55
5.	"Un día de fiesta"	4:38
6.	"Atropello"	1:54
7.	"Tomás"	2:10
8.	"Dos kilillos"	2:03
9.	"Una regresión"	4:53
10.	"Crea, entonces verá"	2:19
11.	"Sola en la casa"	3:31
12.	"La Casita de Tomás"	5:00
13.	"Reunión y final"	3:59
14.	"Créditos finales"	4:41
15.	"Propuesta inicial (Maqueta)"	2:21
16.	"Tema Principal (Coro)"	3:01

== See also ==
- List of ghost films
- List of horror films of 2007
- List of Spanish films of 2007
- List of submissions to the 80th Academy Awards for Best Foreign Language Film
- List of Spanish submissions for the Academy Award for Best Foreign Language Film
