= Mariana Cordero =

Spanish actress

Mariana Cordero is a Spanish actress. She appeared in more than thirty films and TV series since 1999.

Film
Year	Title	Role	Notes
2007	Suso's Tower		
2005	Princesas		
2026	Dreadful Mother		
