= Sunday Light =

- Theatrical release poster
- Spanish: Luz de domingo
- Directed by: José Luis Garci
- Written by: José Luis Garci; Horacio Valcárcel
- Produced by: José Luis Garci
- Starring: Alfredo Landa; Paula Echevarría; Álex González; Kiti Manver; Manuel Galiana; Toni Acosta; Carlos Larrañaga; Andrea Tenuta; Enrique Villén; Francisco Algora; Mapi Sagaseta; Fernando Guillén Cuervo
- Cinematography: Félix Monti
- Edited by: José Luis Garci
- Music by: Pablo Cervantes
- Production company: Nickel Odeon
- Distributed by: Columbia Tri-Star Films
- Release date: 16 November 2007
- Running time: 111 minutes
- Country: Spain
- Language: Spanish

Sunday Light (Spanish: Luz de domingo) is a 2007 Spanish drama film directed by José Luis Garci and starring Álex González, Paula Echevarría and Alfredo Landa. The plot, set in rural Asturias in the early 20th-century, is based on a novel by Ramón Pérez de Ayala.

== Plot ==
In early 20th-century Spain, Urbano, an idealistic liberal young man arrives in Cenciella, a small village, to be a secretary at the town hall. Urbano falls in love with Estrella, the daughter of a local landowner Joaco. Politically, the town is split in two, with the forces of evil repped by mayor Atila. Urbano tries to remain neutral but his intentions would be brutally punished.

The Sunday prior to his wedding to Estrella, while the couple are in the forest enjoying an idyllic moment, everything changes with the presence of the chief, who comes to take revenge. He comes accompanied by his trusty servant, Longinus, and his three sons, who assault the couple. Urbano is tied up to a tree and beaten, while Estrella is brutally raped. However the whole assault is politically motivated as the boss says to his servant when he was denied the chance to do what have his three sons did to the girl, "is political, not vice." At another point the mayor is extending its personal view of what happened: "Women and the laws are to be violated, provided that cause us problems."

Bewildered, Urbano's response is visceral but rational, without resorting to wash his honor and take immediate revenge, as would be more suitable to the melodrama of the time. Thinking in what is best for Estrella and in the future, the family does not report or talk about the rape, and the betrothed marry. What happened serves no other purpose than to sadden the happiness of the bride and relatives. Urbano also sees and makes Juaco, his father in law, see with different eyes, the baby that Estrella is expecting as a result of the rape. Urbano takes the baby as his own.

However vengeance occurs after some time, but in a way that gives it a certain beauty to the outcome of a sad story. Eventually, the couple, along with the child, moved to live in New York, which represents in the film that ideal world, very missed by his grandfather, that rural life amid beautiful scenery could not provide for the ambitions of a local chief.

== Cast ==
- Álex González as Urbano
- Alfredo Landa as Joaco
- Paula Echevarría as Estrella
- Kiti Manver as Doña Predes
- Manuel Galiana as Alpaca
- Toni Acosta as Cova
- Enrique Villén as Longinos
- Andrea Tenuta as Parrula
- Francisco Algora as Chanfaina
- Carlos Larrañaga as Atila
- Mapi Sagaseta as Regina
- Fernando Guillén Cuervo as Ramón

== DVD release ==
Luz de domingo is available in Region 2 DVD in Spanish with English and Portuguese subtitles.

== See also ==
- List of Spanish films of 2007
