= Mataharis =

- Theatrical release poster
- Directed by: Icíar Bollaín
- Written by: Icíar Bollaín; Tatiana Rodríguez
- Produced by: Simón de Santiago
- Starring: Najwa Nimri; María Vázquez; Nuria González; Diego Martín; Tristán Ulloa
- Cinematography: Kiko de la Rica
- Edited by: Angel Hernández Zoido
- Music by: Lucio Godoy
- Release date: 20 September 2007
- Running time: 1h 40 min
- Country: Spain
- Language: Spanish
- Budget: €2,500,000

Mataharis is a 2007 Spanish drama film directed and co-written by Icíar Bollaín. It stars Najwa Nimri, Tristán Ulloa, María Vázquez and Nuria González. The plot follows the lives of three female detectives who investigate the secrets of others, but end up uncovering their own families' lies and truths they would prefer to ignore.

== Plot ==
Inés, Eva and Carmen, three women of different generations, work as private detectives for an investigation agency run by Valbuena, their male chauvinist boss. Inés, the youngest and most ambitious of the three is assigned to work undercover as an employee in a factory to spy on the activities of its union leaders. However, her investigation brings her face to face with a difficult emotional and ethical decision. Initially, she hoped to move through the ranks by working on this case, but her plans go awry when she begins to empathize with and develop feelings for Manuel, one of the key union members she is investigating. This ethical dilemma coupled with the fear of losing her job and career turns her life into a state of turmoil.

Eva has just returned to work at the detective agency after having had her second child. She is assigned to a rather mundane case of tracking down an old man's first love. Eva finds it very hard to juggle her responsibilities and is unable to find the support she needs in her husband, Iñaki. When a mysterious woman called Marta appears in Iñaki’s life, Eva starts an investigation into her spouse’s secret life, stumbling upon the possibility that her husband may not only be having an affair but leading a double life with another wife and family. She follows him from Madrid to Zaragoza where she quickly finds out that he has had a son born from a previous relationship and has now become involved in the life of the child he ignored for 10 years.

Carmen, the oldest and most experienced of the three detectives, is on a routine investigation of both the business partner and the wife of Sergio, a photographer whose wife is having an affair with his business partner and close friend. Carmen sympathizes with Sergio's marital collapse, not seeming to notice the dire straits of her own marriage.

== Cast ==
- Najwa Nimri as Eva
- María Vázquez as Inés
- Nuria González as Carmen
- Diego Martín a Manuel
- Tristán Ulloa as Iñakis
- Fernando Cayo as Valbuena
- Antonio de la Torre as Sergio
- Adolfo Fernández as Alberto

== DVD release ==
Mataharis is available in Region 2 DVD in Spanish with English subtitles.
