= Suso's Tower =

- Theatrical release poster
- Spanish: La torre de Suso
- Directed by: Tom Fernández
- Screenplay by: Tom Fernández
- Produced by: Jaume Roures
- Starring: Javier Cámara; Gonzalo de Castro; César Vea; José Luis Alcobendas; Malena Alterio; Fanny Gautier; Mariana Cordero; Emilio Gutiérrez Caba
- Cinematography: Carlos Suárez
- Edited by: Ángel Hernández-Zoido
- Music by: José Manuel Tejedor; Javier Tejedor
- Production company: Mediapro
- Distributed by: Warner Bros. Pictures International España
- Release dates: 26 September 2007 (Zinemaldia); 9 November 2007 (Spain)
- Country: Spain
- Language: Spanish

Suso's Tower (Spanish: La torre de Suso) is a 2007 Spanish comedy-drama film written and directed by Tom Fernández, in his directorial debut feature. It stars Javier Cámara, Gonzalo de Castro, Malena Alterio, and Emilio Gutiérrez Caba. Fernández was nominated for best new director, Caba for best supporting actor and de Castro for best new actor at the 2008 Goya Awards.

== Plot ==
Cundo emigrated to Argentina to seek a new life. Ten years later he returns home to Asturias, to the funeral of an old friend, Suso. The film chronicles the reunion with family and friends and how Cundo wants to fulfill the ultimate dream of Suso. The film is a tribute to friendship. And above all friendship in an age where it is not so clear why you should remain friends with your childhood friends.

== Cast ==
- Javier Cámara as Cundo
- Gonzalo de Castro as Fernando
- César Vea as Motes
- José Luis Alcobendas as Pablo
- Malena Alterio as Marta
- Emilio Gutiérrez Caba as Tino
- Mariana Cordero as Mercedes
- Fanny Gautier as Rosa
- Alex Amaral as Miguel

== Production ==
The film was produced by Mediapro. José Manuel Tejedor and Javier Tejedor were responsible for the original score whilst Ángel Hernández-Zoido worked as a film editor and Carlos Suárez as a cinematographer.

== Release ==
The film was presented in the Zabaltegi slate of the San Sebastián International Film Festival in September 2007. Distributed by Warner Bros Pictures International España, it was theatrically released on 9 November 2007.

== See also ==
- List of Spanish films of 2007
