= Solitary Fragments =

La soledad
- Theatrical release poster
- Directed by: Jaime Rosales
- Written by: Jaime Rosales; Enric Rufas
- Starring: María Bazán; Petra Martínez; Sonia Almarcha
- Cinematography: Oscar Durán
- Edited by: Nino Martínez Sosa
- Music by: Nino Martínez
- Release date: 2007
- Running time: 130 min.
- Country: Spain
- Budget: 1.800.000 €
- Box office: 684933.13 €

La soledad (English: Solitary Fragments) is a 2007 Spanish drama film written and directed by Jaime Rosales. It was Rosales's second film: he had previously made The Hours of the Day. Solitary Fragments, divided in five chapters, follows a dual narrative; the characters' lives unfold as a series of everyday concerns over health, work, shelter, relationships and money. Made with a small budget and with actors from the theater scene, the film was nominated for three Goya Awards, Spain's most prestigious film awards. It won all three awards, including the Best Film and Director award. Voted by Spanish film critics as Best Film of the year for that reason, it was given the Fotogramas de Plata Award.

== Plot ==
Adela, a young woman recently separated from her husband and with one-year-old baby, is tired of her life in her small hometown of León. She leaves behind the mountains and the country life to move to Madrid. She gets a job as a hostess and moves into an apartment with Carlos and Inés, a nice young couple. The three get along well then, sharing meals, doubts and leisure. Antonia, Inés's mother, has a small neighborhood supermarket. She leads a fairly quiet life with her boyfriend Manolo. Antonia has two more daughters: Nieves and Helena, the eldest. However, little by little, Antonias's pleasant life begins to crumble. First, a doctor detects that Nieves has cancer. Later, the already tense relationship between her daughters gets more complicated when Helena asks her mother borrowed money to buy an apartment on the beach.

Adela has no major difficulties in adapting to urban life, even though the father of her baby does not help her economically. While traveling by bus, she is one of the victims of a terrorist attack, leaving her life in tatters. From that moment she should find the strength to return to a normal life.

== Cast ==
- María Bazán - Helena
- Petra Martínez - Antonia
- Sonia Almarcha - Adela
- Miriam Correa - Inés
- Nuria Mencía - Nieves
- Jesús Cracio - Manolo
- Lluís Villanueva - Carlos
- José Luis Torrijo - Pedro
- Juan Margallo - Padre Adela

== Awards and nominations ==
To see the complete list of awards and nominations, see this link.

Goya Awards

- Best Director (Jaime Rosales, winner)
- Best Film (winner)
- Best New Actor (José Luis Torrijo, winner)

Spanish Actors Union

- Best Actress (Petra Martínez, nominee)
