= Seven Billiard Tables =

- Theatrical release poster
- Spanish: Siete mesas de billar francés
- Directed by: Gracia Querejeta
- Written by: Gracia Querejeta; David Planell
- Produced by: Elías Querejeta
- Starring: Maribel Verdú; Blanca Portillo; Jesús Castejón; Víctor Valdivia; Enrique Villén; Raúl Arévalo; Ramón Barea; Lorena Vindel; José Luis García Pérez; Amparo Baró
- Cinematography: Ángel Iguácel
- Edited by: Nacho Ruiz Capillas
- Music by: Pascal Gaigne
- Release dates: 25 September 2007 (SSIFF); 5 October 2007 (Spain)
- Running time: 116 minutes
- Country: Spain
- Language: Spanish
- Box office: $1.7 million

Seven Billiard Tables (Spanish: Siete mesas de billar francés) is a 2007 Spanish sports comedy-drama film directed by Gracia Querejeta. She also co-wrote the story with David Planell. In 2008, the film was nominated for nine Goya Awards. It won two awards, including the Best Actress award (for Maribel Verdú).

== Cast ==
- Raúl Arévalo as Fele
- Ramón Barea as Jacinto
- Amparo Baró as Emilia
- Jesús Castejón as Antonio
- Blanca Portillo as Charo
- Víctor Valdivia as Guille
- Maribel Verdú as Ángela

Principal photography was done from 28 August 2006 to 3 November 2006.

== Awards and nominations ==
for a complete list of awards and nominations, see this link.

XXII Goya Awards

- Best Actress (Blanca Portillo, nominee)
- Best Actress (Maribel Verdú, winner)
- Best Cinematography (Ángel Iguacel, nominee)
- Best Director (Gracia Querejeta, nominee)
- Best Editing (Nacho Ruiz Capillas, nominee)
- Best Film (nominee)
- Best Screenplay - Original (David Planell and Gracia Querejeta, nominee)
- Best Supporting Actor (Raúl Arévalo, nominee)
- Best Supporting Actress (Amparo Baró, winner)

San Sebastián Film Festival

- Best Actress - Silver Seashell (Blanca Portillo, winner)
- Best Screenplay (David Planell and Gracia Querejeta, tied winner)
- Golden Seashell (Gracia Querejeta, nominee)
