= Goya Award for Best Adapted Screenplay =

Annual award by the Spanish Film Academy

Goya Awards for Best Adapted Screenplay
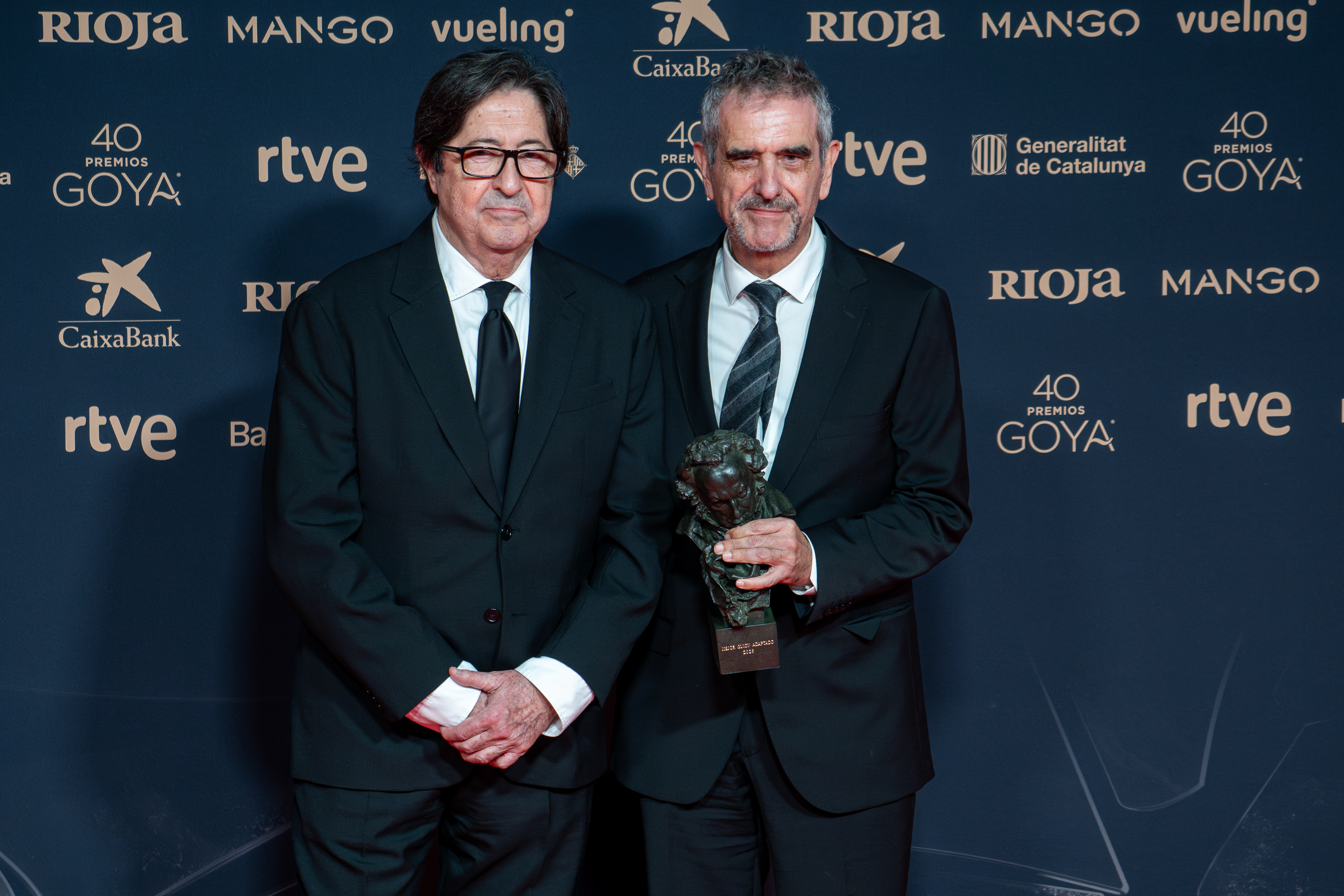
- The 2026 recipients (along with Yolanda García Serrano): Manuel Gómez Pereira and Joaquín Oristrell
- Native name: Premio Goya al mejor guión adaptado
- Awarded for: Best adapted screenplay in a Spanish film of the year
- Country: Spain
- Presented by: Academy of Cinematographic Arts and Sciences of Spain (AACCE)
- First award: 1st Goya Awards (1986)
- Most recent winner: Joaquín Oristrell, Manuel Gómez Pereira, Yolanda García Serrano; The Dinner (2025)
- Website: Official website

The Goya Award for Best Adapted Screenplay (Spanish: Premio Goya al mejor guión adaptado) is one of the Goya Awards presented annually by the Academy of Cinematographic Arts and Sciences of Spain (AACCE).

For the first two editions of the Goya Awards, only one award for screenplays was presented which included both original and adapted screenplays, with both winners being adaptations, Voyage to Nowhere in 1986 (based on the novel of the same name by Fernando Fernán Gómez) and El Bosque animado (based on the eponymous novel by Wenceslao Fernández Flórez) in 1987. Since the third edition, two awards are presented separately, Best Original Screenplay and Best Adapted Screenplay.

Rafael Azcona has received this award four times, more than any other nominee, winning for ¡Ay Carmela! (1990) with Carlos Saura, Banderas, the Tyrant (1993) with José Luis García Sánchez, Butterfly's Tongue (1999) with Manuel Rivas and José Luis Cuerda and The Blind Sunflowers (2008) with José Luis Cuerda.

== Winners and nominees ==
=== 1980s ===
Best Screenplay

Year	English title	Original title	Recipient(s)
1986	Voyage to Nowhere	El viaje a ninguna parte	Fernando Fernán Gómez
1986	Dear Nanny	Tata mía	José Luis Borau
1986	Mambru Went to War	Mambrú se fue a la guerra	Fernando Fernán Gómez
1987	The Enchanted Forest	El bosque animado	Rafael Azcona
1987	The War of the Madmen	La guerra de los locos	Manolo Matji
1987	Moors and Christians	Moros y cristianos	Luis García Berlanga and Rafael Azcona

Best Adapted Screenplay

Year	English title	Original title	Recipient(s)	Source material
1988	Jarrapellejos		Manuel Gutiérrez Aragón and Antonio Giménez-Rico	The novel of the same name by Felipe Trigo
1988	El túnel		Antonio Drove, Carlos A. Cornejo and José A. Mahieu	The novel of the same name by Ernesto Sabato
1988	El placer de matar		Félix Rotaeta	The novel Las pistolas by Félix Rotaeta
1988	Scent of a Crime	El aire de un crimen	Antonio Isasi-Isasmendi, Gabriel Castro and Jorge R. del Álamo	The novel of the same name by Juan Benet
1988	El Lute II: Tomorrow I'll be Free	El Lute II: mañana seré libre	Vicente Aranda, Joaquim Jordà and Eleuterio Sánchez	The memoir Camina o revienta by Eleuterio Sánchez
1989	Twisted Obsession	El sueño del mono loco	Fernando Trueba, Manuel Matji and Menno Meyjes	The novel Le rêve du singe fou by Christopher Frank
1989	The Sea and the Weather	El mar y el viento	Fernando Fernán Gómez	The novel of the same name by Fernando Fernán Gómez
1989	Bajarse al moro		José Luis Alonso de Santos, Joaquín Oristrell and Fernando Colomo	The play of the same name by José Luis Alonso de Santos
1989	Esquilache		Josefina Molina, Joaquín Oristrell and José Sámano	The play Un Soñador para un Pueblo by Antonio Buero Vallejo
1989	If They Tell You I Fell	Si te dicen que caí	Vicente Aranda	The novel Si te dicen que caí by Juan Marsé

=== 1990s ===
Year	English title	Original title	Recipient(s)	Source material
1990	¡Ay Carmela!		Carlos Saura and Rafael Azcona	The play of the same name by José Sanchis Sinisterra
1990	The Ages of Lulu	Las edades de Lulú	Bigas Luna and Almudena Grandes	The novel Las edades de Lulú by Almudena Grandes
1990	La sombra del ciprés es alargada		Luis Alcoriza	The novel of the same name by Miguel Delibes
1991	The Dumbfounded King	El rey pasmado	Juan Potau and Gonzalo Torrente Malvido	The novel Crónica del rey pasmado by Gonzalo Torrente Malvido
1991	Cómo ser mujer y no morir en el intento		Carmen Rico Godoy	The novel of the same name by Carmen Rico Godoy
1991	Prince of Shadows	Beltenebros	Mario Camus, Pilar Miró and Juan Antonio Porto	The novel Beltenebros by Antonio Muñoz Molina
1992	The Fencing Master	El maestro de esgrima	Francisco Prada, Antonio Larreta, Pedro Olea and Arturo Pérez-Reverte	The novel El maestro de esgrima by Arturo Pérez-Reverte
1992	Yo me bajo en la próxima, ¿y usted?		Adolfo Marsillach	The novel of the same name by Adolfo Marsillach
1992	The Greek Labyrinth	El laberinto griego	Rafael Alcázar and Manuel Vázquez Montalbán	The novel of the same name by Manuel Vázquez Montalbán
1993	Banderas, the Tyrant	Tirano Banderas	José Luis García Sánchez and Rafael Azcona	The novel of the same name by Ramón María del Valle-Inclán
1993	La febre d'or		Guillem-Jordi Graells and Gonzalo Herralde	The novel of the same name by Narcís Oller
1993	The Bilingual Lover	El amante bilingüe	Vicente Aranda	The novel of the same name by Juan Marsé
1994	Running Out of Time	Días contados	Imanol Uribe	The novel of the same name by Juan Madrid
1994	Cradle Song	Canción de cuna	José Luis Garci and Gregorio Martínez Sierra	The play Canción de cuna by Gregorio Martínez Sierra
1994	The Turkish Passion	La pasión turca	Vicente Aranda	The novel La pasión turca by Antonio Gala
1995	Stories from the Kronen	Historias del Kronen	Montxo Armendáriz and José Ángel Mañas	The novel Historias del Kronen by José Ángel Mañas
1995	El Palomo cojo		Jaime de Armiñán	The novel of the same name by Eduardo Mendicutti
1995	El perquè de tot plegat		Ventura Pons	The novel of the same name by Quim Monzó
1996	The Dog in the Manger	El perro del hortelano	Pilar Miró and Rafael Pérez Sierra	The play of the same name by Lope de Vega
1996	Beyond the Garden	Más allá del jardín	Mario Camus	The novel Más allá del jardín by Antonio Gala
1996	Tramway to Malvarrosa	Tranvía a la Malvarrosa	Rafael Azcona and José Luis García Sánchez	The novel of the same name by Manuel Vicent
1997 (12th)	The Chambermaid on the Titanic	La camarera del Titanic	Bigas Luna and Cuca Canals	The novel La Femme de chambre du Titanic by Didier Decoin
1997 (12th)	Actrius		Ventura Pons and Josep Maria Benet	The play E.R. by Josep Maria Benet
1997 (12th)	Backroads	Carreteras secundarias	Ignacio Martínez de Pisón	The novel of the same name by Ignacio Martínez de Pisón
1998 (13th)	Mensaka	Mensaka, páginas de una historia	Salvador García Ruiz	The novel of the same name by José Ángel Mañas
1998 (13th)	The Grandfather	El abuelo	José Luis Garci and Horacio Valcárcel	The novel El abuelo by Benito Pérez Galdós
1998 (13th)	The Stolen Years	Los años bárbaros	Fernando Colomo, José Ángel Esteban, Carlos López and Nicolás Sánchez-Albornoz	The novel Otros hombres by Manuel Lamana
1998 (13th)	Mararía		Antonio Betancor and Carlos Álvarez	The novel of the same name by Rafael Arozarena
1999 (14th)	Butterfly's Tongue	La lengua de las mariposas	Rafael Azcona, Manuel Rivas and José Luis Cuerda	The short stories "A lingua das bolboretas", "Un saxo na néboa" and "Carmiña" from the book Que me queres, amor? by Manuel Rivas
1999 (14th)	Beloved/Friend	Amic/Amat	Josep Maria Benet	The play Testamento by Josep Maria Benet
1999 (14th)	No One Writes to the Colonel	El coronel no tiene quien le escriba	Paz Alicia Garciadiego	The novella El coronel no tiene quien le escriba by Gabriel García Márquez
1999 (14th)	Manolito Four Eyes	Manolito Gafotas	Miguel Albaladejo and Elvira Lindo	The character by Elvira Lindo

=== 2000s ===
Year	English title	Original title	Recipient(s)	Source material
2000 (15th)	Lázaro de Tormes		Fernando Fernán Gómez	The novella Lazarillo de Tormes by an anonymous author
2000 (15th)	The Goalkeeper	El portero	Manuel Hidalgo and Gonzalo Suárez	The short story of the same name by Manuel Hidalgo
2000 (15th)	The Other Side	El otro barrio	Salvador García Ruiz	The novel of the same name by Elvira Lindo
2000 (15th)	Nico and Dani	Krámpack	Cesc Gay and Tomàs Aragay	The play Krámpack by Jordi Sánchez Zaragoza
2001 (16th)	Savages	Salvajes	Jorge Juan Martínez, Juan Carlos Molinero, Clara Pérez Escrivá and Lola Salvador Maldonado	The play of the same name by José Luis Alonso de Santos
2001 (16th)	Anita Takes a Chance	Anita no pierde el tren	Ventura Pons and Lluís-Anton Baulenas	The short story Bones obres by Lluís-Anton Baulenas
2001 (16th)	The Dutchman's Island	L'illa de l'holandès	Sigfrid Monleón, Ferran Torrent, Dominic Harari and Teresa de Pelegrí	The novel of the same name by Ferran Torrent
2001 (16th)	Sound of the Sea	Son de mar	Rafael Azcona	The novel Son de mar by Manuel Vicent
2002 (17th)	Common Ground	Lugares comunes	Adolfo Aristarain and Kathy Saavedra	The novel El renacimiento by Lorenzo F. Aristarain
2002 (17th)	Don Quixote, Knight Errant	El caballero Don Quijote	Manuel Gutiérrez Aragón	The second part of the novel Don Quixote by Miguel de Cervantes
2002 (17th)	The Shanghai Spell	El embrujo de Shanghai	Fernando Trueba	The novella Elembrujo de Shanghai by Juan Marsé
2002 (17th)	You'll Be Back	Volverás	Antonio Chavarrías	The novel Un enano español se suicida en Las Vegasby Francisco Casavella
2003 (18th)	My Life Without Me	Mi vida sin mí	Isabel Coixet	The short story collection Pretending the Bed is a Raft by Nanci Kincaid
2003 (18th)	The Weakness of the Bolshevik	La flaqueza del bolchevique	Manuel Martín Cuenca and Lorenzo Silva	The novel of the same name by Lorenzo Silva
2003 (18th)	The End of a Mystery	La luz prodigiosa	Fernando Marías	The novel La luz prodigiosa by Fernando Marías
2003 (18th)	Soldiers of Salamina	Los soldados de Salamina	David Trueba	The book Soldados de Salamina by Javier Cercas
2004 (19th)	The Motorcycle Diaries	Diarios de motocicleta	José Rivera	The memoir Diarios de motocicleta by Che Guevara
2004 (19th)	The Year of the Flood	El año del diluvio	Jaime Chávarri and Eduardo Mendoza	The novel of the same name by Eduardo Mendoza
2004 (19th)	Don't Move	Non ti muovere	Margaret Mazzantini and Sergio Castellitto	The novel Non ti muovere by Margaret Mazzantini
2004 (19th)	Voices in the Night	Las voces de la noche	Salvador García Ruiz	The novel Le voci della sera by Natalia Ginzburg
2005 (20th)	The Method	El método	Marcelo Piñeyro and Mateo Gil	The play El mètode Grönholm by Jordi Galceran
2005 (20th)	Ninette		José Luis Garci and Horacio Valcárcel	The plays Ninette y un señor de Murcia and Ninette, modas de París by Miguel Mihura
2005 (20th)	Obaba		Montxo Armendáriz	The novel Obabakoak by Bernardo Atxaga
2005 (20th)	The Longest Penalty Shot in the World	El penalti más largo del mundo	Roberto Santiago	The short story El penalti más largo del mundo by Osvaldo Soriano
2006 (21st)	Salvador (Puig Antich)		Lluís Arcarazo	The book Compte enrere. La història de Salvador Puig Antich by Francesc Escribano
2006 (21st)	Alatriste		Agustín Díaz Yanes	The series of novels Las aventuras del capitán Alatriste by Arturo Pérez-Reverte
2006 (21st)	Summer Rain	El camino de los ingleses	Antonio Soler	The novel El camino de los ingleses by Antonio Soler
2006 (21st)	The Education of Fairies	La educación de las hadas	José Luis Cuerda	The novel L'éducation d'une fée by Didier van Cauwelaert
2007 (22nd)	Under the Stars	Bajo las estrellas	Félix Viscarret	The novel El trompetista del Utopía by Fernando Aramburu
2007 (22nd)	Barcelona (un mapa)		Ventura Pons	The play Barcelona, mapa de sombras by Lluïsa Cunillé
2007 (22nd)	The Nautical Chart	La carta esférica	Imanol Uribe	The novel of the same name by Arturo Pérez-Reverte
2007 (22nd)	Modesty	Pudor	Tristán Ulloa	The novel of the same name by Santiago Roncagliolo
2007 (22nd)	La zona		Laura Santullo	The short story of the same name from the book El otro lado by Laura Santullo
2008 (23rd)	The Blind Sunflowers	Los girasoles ciegos	Rafael Azcona and José Luis Cuerda	The novel Los girasoles ciegos by Alberto Méndez
2008 (23rd)	Che: The Argentine	Che: el argentino	Peter Buchman	The writings Pasajes de la Guerra Revolucionaria and Diario del Che en Bolivia by Che Guevara
2008 (23rd)	The Oxford Murders	The crímenes de Oxford	Jorge Guerricaechevarria and Álex de la Iglesia	The novel Crímenes imperceptibles by Guillermo Martínez
2008 (23rd)	One Word from You	Una palabra tuya	Ángeles González-Sinde	The novel of the same name by Elvira Lindo
2009 (24th)	Cell 211	Celda 211	Jorge Guerricaechevarría and Daniel Monzón	The novel Celda 211 by Francisco Pérez Gandul
2009 (24th)	The Dancer and the Thief	El baile de la Victoria	Fernando Trueba, Antonio Skármeta and Jonás Trueba	The novel El baile de la Victoria by Antonio Skármeta
2009 (24th)	El cónsul de Sodoma		Joaquín Górriz, Miguel Dalmau, Sigfrid Monleón and Miguel Ángel Fernández	The biography Jaime Gil de Biedma by Miguel Dalmau
2009 (24th)	The Secret in Their Eyes	El secreto de sus ojos	Juan José Campanella and Eduardo Sacheri	The novel La pregunta de sus ojos by Eduardo Sacheri

=== 2010s ===
Year	English title	Original title	Recipient(s)	Source material
2010 (25th)	Black Bread	Pa negre (Pan negro)	Agustí Villaronga	The novel Pa negre by Emili Teixidor
2010 (25th)	Elisa K		Jordi Cadena	The novel Elisa Kiseljak by Lolita Bosch
2010 (25th)	Room in Rome	Habitación en Roma	Julio Medem	The screenplay from the movie In Bed by Julio Rojas
2010 (25th)	Three Steps Above Heaven	Tres metros sobre el cielo	Ramón Salazar	The novel Tres metros sobre el cielo by Federico Moccia
2011 (26th)	Wrinkles	Arrugas	Ángel de la Cruz, Ignacio Ferreras, Paco Roca and Rosanna Cecchini	The comic book Arrugas by Paco Roca
2011 (26th)	The Skin I Live In	La piel que habito	Pedro Almodóvar	The novel Mygale by Thierry Jonquet
2011 (26th)	Kathmandu Lullaby	Katmandú, un espejo en el cielo	Icíar Bollaín	The autobiography Una maestra en Katmandú by Vicki Sherpa
2011 (26th)	The Sleeping Voice	La voz dormida	Ignacio del Moral and Benito Zambrano	The novel La voz dormida by Dulce Chacón
2012 (27th)	Tad, The Lost Explorer	Las aventuras de Tadeo Jones	Javier Barreira, Gorka Magallón, Ignacio del Moral, Jordi Gasull and Neil Landau	The graphic novel Tadeo Jones y el secreto de Toactlum by Javier Barreira, Gorka Magallón, and Enrique Gato
2012 (27th)	The End	Fin	Sergio G. Sánchez and Jorge Guerricaechevarría	The novel Fin by David Monteagudo
2012 (27th)	Tengo ganas de ti		Ramón Salazar	The novel of the same name by Federico Moccia
2012 (27th)	All Is Silence	Todo es silencio	Manuel Rivas	The novel of the same name by Manuel Rivas
2012 (27th)	Invader	Invasor	Javier Gullón and Jorge Arenillas	The novel of the same name by Fernando Marías
2013 (28th)	All the Women	Todas las mujeres	Alejandro Hernández and Mariano Barroso	The television series of the same name by Mariano Barroso
2013 (28th)	Scorpion in Love	Alacrán enamorado	Carlos Bardem and Santiago A. Zannou	The novel Alacrán enamorado by Carlos Bardem
2013 (28th)	Cannibal	Caníbal	Manuel Martín Cuenca and Alejandro Hernández	The novel Caníbal by Humberto Arenal
2013 (28th)	Zip & Zap and the Marble Gang	Zipi y Zape y el club de la canica	Jorge Lara and Francisco Roncal	The comic book series Zipi y Zape by José Escobar Saliente
2014 (29th)	Mortadelo and Filemon: Mission Implausible	Mortadelo y Filemón contra Jimmy el Cachondo	Javier Fesser, Claro García and Cristóbal Ruiz	The comic series Mortadelo y Filemón by Ibañez
2014 (29th)	A esmorga		Carlos Asorey and Ignacio Vilar	The novel of the same name by Eduardo Blanco Amor
2014 (29th)	Nightfall in India	Anochece en la India	Chema Rodríguez, David Planell and Pablo Burgués	The novel Anochece en Katmandú by Chema Rodríguez
2014 (29th)	Traces of Sandalwood	Rastres de sàndal	Anna Soler-Pont	The novel of the same name by Anna Soler-Pont and Asha Miró
2015 (30th)	A Perfect Day	Un día perfecto	Fernando León de Aranoa	The novel Dejarse Llover by Paula Farias
2015 (30th)	B, la película		David Ilundain	The play Ruz-Bárcenas by Jordi Casanovas
2015 (30th)	The King of Havana	El rey de La Habana	Agustí Villaronga	The novel of the same name by Pedro Juan Gutiérrez
2015 (30th)	The Bride	La novia	Paula Ortiz and Javier García Arredondo	The play Bodas de sangre by Federico García Lorca
2016 (31st)	Smoke & Mirrors	El hombre de las mil caras	Alberto Rodríguez and Rafael Cobos	The book Paesa, el espía de las mil caras by Manuel Cerdán
2016 (31st)	Julieta		Pedro Almodóvar	The short stories "Chance", "Silence" and "Soon" from the book Runaway by Alice Munro
2016 (31st)	Kiki, Love to Love	Kiki, el amor se hace	Paco León and Fernando Pérez	The film The Little Death by Josh Lawson
2016 (31st)	A Monster Calls	Un monstruo viene a verme	Patrick Ness	The novel of the same name by Patrick Ness
2017 (32nd)	The Bookshop	La librería	Isabel Coixet	The novel of the same name by Penelope Fitzgerald
2017 (32nd)	The Motive	El autor	Manuel Martín Cuenca and Alejandro Hernández	The novel El móvil by Javier Cercas
2017 (32nd)	Uncertain Glory		Agustí Villaronga and Coral Cruz	The novel of the same name by Joan Sales
2017 (32nd)	Holy Camp!	La llamada	Javier Ambrossi and Javier Calvo	The musical La llamada by Javier Ambrossi and Javier Calvo
2018 (33rd)	A Twelve-Year Night	La noche de 12 años	Álvaro Brechner	The book Memorias del calabozo by Mauricio Rosencof and Eleuterio Fernández Huidobro
2018 (33rd)	Jefe		Marta Sofía Martíns and Natxo López	
2018 (33rd)	Superlópez		Borja Cobeaga and Diego San José	The comic series of the same name by Jan
2018 (33rd)	Yuli: The Carlos Acosta Story	Yuli	Paul Laverty	The autobiography No Way Home by Carlos Acosta
2019 (34th)	Out in the Open	Intemperie	Benito Zambrano, Daniel Remón and Pablo Remón	The novel of the same name by Jesús Carrasco
2019 (34th)	Buñuel in the Labyrinth of the Turtles	Buñuel en el laberinto de las tortugas	Eligio R. Montero and Salvador Simó	The graphic novel Buñuel en el laberinto de las tortugas by Fermín Solís
2019 (34th)	Mother	Madre	Isabel Peña and Rodrigo Sorogoyen	The short film Madre by Rodrigo Sorogoyen
2019 (34th)	Advantages of Travelling by Train	Ventajas de viajar en tren	Javier Gullón	The novel of the same name by Antonio Orejudo

=== 2020s ===
Year	English title	Original title	Recipient(s)	Source material
2020 (35th)	Ane Is Missing	Ane	David Pérez Sañudo and Marina Parés Pulido	The short film of the same name by David Pérez Sañudo
2020 (35th)	The People Upstairs	Sentimental	Cesc Gay	The play Los vecinos de arriba by Cesc Gay
2020 (35th)	The Europeans	Los europeos	Bernardo Sánchez and Marta Libertad Castillo	The novel Los europeos by Rafael Azcona
2020 (35th)	Unknown Origins	Orígenes secretos	David Galán Galindo and Fernando Navarro	The novel Orígenes Secretos by David Galán Galindo
2021 (36th)	Outlaws	Las leyes de la frontera	Daniel Monzón, Jorge Guerricaechevarría	The novel Las leyes de la frontera by Javier Cercas
2021 (36th)	Ama		Júlia de Paz Solvas, Núria Dunjó López	The short film of the same name by Júlia de la Paz
2021 (36th)	The Belly of the Sea	El vientre del mar	Agustí Villaronga	The novel Ocean Sea by Alessandro Baricco
2021 (36th)	Lemon and Poppy Seed Cake	Pan de limón con semillas de amapola	Benito Zambrano, Cristina Campos	The novel of the same name by Cristina Campos
2022 (37th)	One Year, One Night	Un año, una noche	Fran Araújo, Isa Campo, Isaki Lacuesta	The book Paz, amor y death metal by Ramón González
2022 (37th)	Piggy	Cerdita	Carlota Pereda	The short film of the same name by Carlota Pereda
2022 (37th)	Irati		Paul Urkijo Alijo	The book El ciclo de Irati by J. L. Landa and J. Muñoz
2022 (37th)	God's Crooked Lines	Los renglones torcidos de Dios	Guillem Clua, Oriol Paulo	The novel Los renglones torcidos de Dios by Torcuato Luca de Tena
2022 (37th)	Staring at Strangers	No mires a los ojos	David Muñoz, Félix Viscarret	The play Desde las sombras by Juan José Millás
2023 (38th)	Robot Dreams		Pablo Berger	The graphic novel of the same name by Sara Varon
2023 (38th)	The Teacher Who Promised the Sea	El maestro que prometió el mar	Albert Val	The book El mestre que va prometre el mar by Francesc Escribano
2023 (38th)	Society of the Snow	La sociedad de la nieve	Bernat Vilaplana, J.A. Bayona, Jaime Marques-Olarreaga, Nicolás Casariego	The book of the same name by Pablo Vierci
2023 (38th)	Un amor		Isabel Coixet, Laura Ferrero	The novel of the same name by Sara Mesa
2023 (38th)	Jokes & Cigarettes	Saben aquell	David Trueba, Albert Espinosa	The books Eugenio and Saben aquell que diu by Gerard Jofra
2024 (39th)	The Room Next Door	La habitación de al lado	Pedro Almodóvar	The novel What Are You Going Through by Sigrid Nunez
2024 (39th)	La casa		Álex Montoya, Joana M. Ortueta	The graphic novel of the same name by Paco Roca
2024 (39th)	Glimmers	Los destellos	Pilar Palomero	The story Bihotz handiegia by Eider Rodríguez
2024 (39th)	Salve Maria		Mar Coll, Valentina Viso	The novel Amek ez dute by Katixa Agirre
2024 (39th)	I'm Nevenka	Soy Nevenka	Icíar Bollaín, Isa Campo	The books Hay algo que no es como me dicen: el caso Nevenka Fernández contra la realidad by Juan José Millás and El poder de la verdad by Nevenka Fernández
2025 (40th)	The Dinner	La cena	Joaquín Oristrell, Manuel Gómez Pereira, Yolanda García Serrano	The play La cena de los generales by José Luis Alonso de Santos
2025 (40th)	Sleepless City	Ciudad sin sueño	Guillermo Galoe, Víctor Alonso-Berbel	The short film Aunque es de noche by Galoe
2025 (40th)	The Good Manners	La buena letra	Celia Rico Clavellino	The novel La buena letra by Rafael Chirbes
2025 (40th)	Romería		Carla Simón	The letters written by Simón's mother
2025 (40th)	Deaf	Sorda	Eva Libertad	The short film Sorda by Libertad
