= Ángel Matanzo =

Madrid City Councillor
- In office 23 May 1983 – 17 June 1995

Personal details
- Born: c. 1937; Madrid
- Died: 5 March 2017; Pozuelo de Alarcón
- Citizenship: Spanish
- Political party: AP (1977–1989); PP (1989–1995); PADE (1997–?)
- Occupation: Politician, butcher

Ángel Matanzo España (c. 1937 – 5 March 2017) was a Spanish butcher and politician, city councillor of Madrid between 1983 and 1995.

== Biography ==
Born in Madrid circa 1937, to a humble family, son of a butcher (father) and a greengrocer (mother), Matanzo managed a butcher's shop. A member of People's Alliance since 1977 he was elected to the City Council of Madrid for the first time in the 1983 municipal election. Re-elected in the 1987 election, after the 1989 successful motion of no confidence against the then Mayor, Juan Barranco, who was replaced by Agustín Rodríguez Sahagún, Matanzo became the city councillor responsible for the Centro District. During a controversial rule, he became singularly known by his authoritarian measures; closing down stores and launching razzias against street vending.

Matanzo was sacked from the municipal government board by the Mayor José María Álvarez del Manzano in 1993, after a clash with the Culture's councillor Pedro Ortiz, since Matanzo had decreed the shutting of the Teatro Alfil, as it was the premises where a theatrical play, Cabaret Castizo, was being aired since 5 January. The Eduardo Fuente's play, starred three characters: a talking bear, an arbutus, and a sheriff (performed by Chete Lera) making the latter a parody out of Matanzo. He was replaced as responsible for the Centro District by María Antonia Suárez. After two years in political ostracism, during which he was degraded to the (unmeaningful) role of "Mayor's provisions consultant", Matanzo left the People's Party in 1995.

Matanzo would then get involved in several political initiatives: he joined the Dr. Alfonso Cabezas's Platform of the Independents of Spain (PIE) in 1995, running first in the PIE list for the May 1995 municipal election. In 1997 he became a member of the national council of the Spanish Democratic Party (PADE), led by the also former PP politician Juan Ramón Calero. He ran again as candidate in the 1999 municipal election, leading the list of the far-right Alianza por la Unidad Nacional, founded by Ricardo Sáenz de Ynestrillas.

He died on 5 March 2017 in Pozuelo de Alarcón.

== Matanzo in popular culture ==
Matanzo is mentioned by one of the characters of the novel Historias del Kronen (on which the 1995 namesake film is based) by Spanish author José Ángel Mañas. The character alludes to the trouble coming up with ways to obtain recreational drugs: "nowadays things are very bleak, particularly since Matanzo is [around]... We are becoming more European by the time..." (ahora que están las cosas muy chungas, sobre todo desde que está el Matanzo... Cada vez somos más europeos).

== Bibliography ==
- Alpuente, Moncho (2 June 1999). "Matancillas". El País.
- Carbajo, Juan Antonio (6 March 2017). "Ángel Matanzo, el concejal que quiso ser el 'sheriff' de Madrid". El País.
- Davison, Phil (26 January 1993). "Out of Spain: Sheriff comes off second best in an artistic shootout". The Independent.
- Garcés, Marcela Theresa (2010). (Re)membering the Madrid Movida: Life, Death, and Legacy in the Contemporary Corpus.
- Medialdea, Sara (6 March 2017). "Muere el exconcejal popular en el Ayuntamiento de Madrid Ángel Matanzo". ABC.
- Mercado, Francisco (20 November 1992). "Un consejero del concejal Matanzo promueve la principal operación de fusión de la ultraderecha". El País.
- Novo (22 December 1991). "El gordo reparte 28.500 millones de pesetas en el centro de Madrid". La Vanguardia: 30.
- Otero, Lara (15 June 1995). "22 concejales se despiden del Ayuntamiento con algún sollozo". El País.
- Pozo, Ángeles del (5 September 1994). "Matanzo, dispuesto a encabeza otras listas distintas a las del PP". ABC. Madrid: 64.
- Smith, Carter E. (2004). "Social Criticism or Banal Imitation?: A Critique of the Neo-realist Novel Apropos the Works of José Angel Mañas". Ciberletras: Revista de crítica literaria y de cultura (12). ISSN 1523-1720.
- Torres, Rosana (28 January 1993a). "La obra que parodia a Matanzo prorroga dos meses sus representaciones". El País.
- Torres, Rosana (23 February 1993b). "La nueva concejal de Centro desaloja a Matanzo del despacho en el que se había refugiado". El País.
- Vilches de Frutos, María Francisca (1995). "La temporada teatral española 1992–1993". Anales de la literatura española contemporánea. 20 (3). Society of Spanish & Spanish-American Studies: 463–502. ISSN 0272-1635. JSTOR 27741276.
