= Isabel Moreno (disambiguation) =

Isabel Moreno (Isabel Moreno Pérez; 1942–2024) was a Cuban actress.

Isabel Moreno may also refer to:

- Isabel Moreno (politician, born 1976) (María Isabel Moreno Fernández), Spanish politician
- Isabel Moreno (politician, born 1984) (Isabel María Moreno Mohamed), Spanish politician

== See also ==
- Maribel Moreno (disambiguation)
