= Fernando Grande-Marlaska =

Spanish judge and politician (born 1962)

The Most Excellent Fernando Grande-Marlaska MP
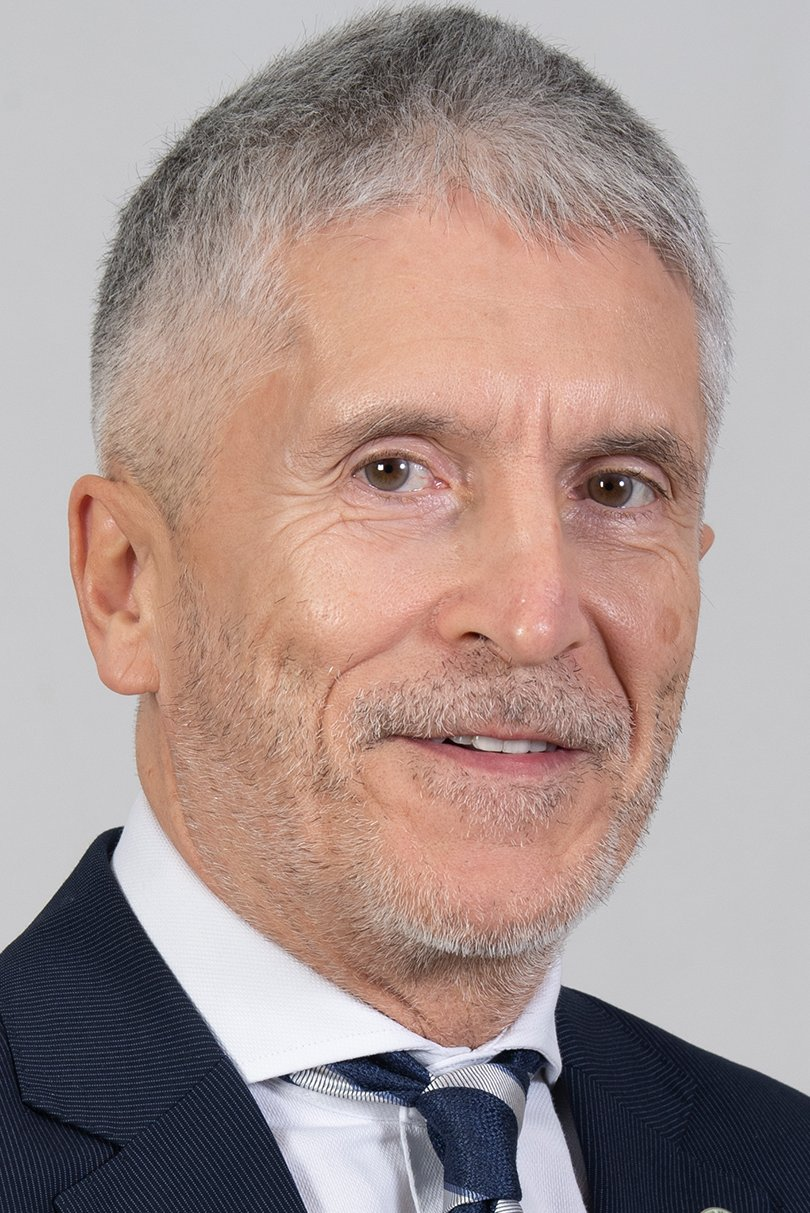
- Official portrait, 2023

Minister of the Interior
- Incumbent
- Assumed office 7 June 2018
- Monarch: Felipe VI
- Prime Minister: Pedro Sánchez
- Preceded by: Juan Ignacio Zoido

Member of the General Council of the Judiciary
- In office 4 December 2013 – 7 June 2018
- President: Carlos Lesmes Serrano

Chair of the Criminal Chamber of the Audiencia Nacional
- In office 16 April 2013 – 6 June 2018
- Preceded by: Javier Gómez Bermúdez

Member of the Congress of Deputies
- In office 17 August 2023 – 1 December 2023
- Succeeded by: Isabel Moreno
- Constituency: Cádiz
- In office 21 May 2019 – 21 February 2020
- Constituency: Cádiz

Personal details
- Born: Fernando Grande-Marlaska Gómez; 26 July 1962 (age 64) Bilbao, Spain
- Spouse: Gorka Gómez (m. 2005)
- Education: University of Deusto

Fernando Grande-Marlaska Gómez (Spanish pronunciation: [feɾˈnando ˈɣɾande maɾˈlaska]; born 26 July 1962) is a Spanish judge and politician who has served as minister of the Interior since June 2018. An independent politician close to the Spanish Socialist Workers' Party, he was a Member of the Congress of Deputies from 2019 to 2020, and briefly from August to December 2023, representing Cádiz.

Grande-Marlaska has been a well-known judge since the early 2000s for his time at the Audiencia Nacional, where he tried several members of the Basque separatist group ETA and he led the trial that followed the Yak-42 accident, among other relevant cases. He also served as a Member of the General Council of the Judiciary —the governing body of the Spanish judiciary— from 2013 to 2018.

== Biography ==
=== Early life and career ===
Born in Bilbao, he is the son of Avelino Grande, an officer of the Bilbao Municipal Police. He entered the judicial profession in 1987 and served in the Court of First Instance and Inquiry in Santoña, Cantabria, from where he was the investigating magistrate in the case against Rafael Escobedo for the Assassination of the Marquesses of Urquijo. In 1990, he moved to Bilbao's Court of Inquiry No. 2, where he remained for nine years. At that time, he promoted the presiding judge of the Sixth Section of the Criminal Division of the Provincial Court of Biscay.

In 2003, he moved to Madrid as investigating judge of the district of the 36th Court of Inquiry.

In 2004, he was appointed to the Audiencia Nacional as a substitute judge for Judge Baltasar Garzón in the Central Court of Inquiry No. 5, where he made his name at the national level, and was already known as an instructor in Bilbao.

=== Magistrate of the Audiencia Nacional ===
Until 30 June 2006, he was a member of the Central Examining Court number 5 of the Audiencia Nacional, temporarily replacing its head, Judge Baltasar Garzón. When Garzón returned to his post on 1 July 2006, Grande-Marlaska was assigned to the Criminal Division of the Audiencia Nacional. He ran as an independent candidate for the General Council of the Judiciary (2006), but was not elected.

In 2007, he took over from Teresa Palacios the Central Examining Court No. 3 of the Audiencia Nacional.

At that time, he took up the most important case: the Yak-42 accident in Turkey, which killed 62 soldiers on their return from Afghanistan on 26 May 2003. However, four months after arriving at the courthouse, on 1 June 2007, he shelved the case and attributed the responsibility to the Ukrainian crew, clearing the Ministry of Defense of the accident for hiring an unsafe plane. He also found unnecessary the identification of 30 corpses.

However, on 22 January 2008, the Fourth Section of the Criminal Division unanimously revoked the decision to shelve the case, alleging that the judge had not exercised any diligence and had failed to defend the victims' constitutional right to due process. Once the case was reopened, he called the military leadership of the time as witnesses, as well as former ministers Federico Trillo and José Bono, but exonerated high-ranking officials of the Ministry of Defense of guilt despite their having been reported on the poor state of the aircraft. Finally, on 20 May 2008, he charged five high-ranking military commanders, including the Chief of the Defence Staff, Antonio Moreno, the highest military officer at the time of the accident, with 62 counts of serious negligence.

On 30 August 2007, he ordered the opening of an oral trial for insulting the Crown to several graphic artists. In June 2007, it was decided to close the case against four directors of Air Madrid for alleged fraud committed during the crisis that affected the airline in December 2006 and, in September 2007, rejected the appeals filed by the General Association of Consumers and Users and the Organization of Consumers and Users (OCU) against the car's filing.

On 23 February 2012, he was appointed President of the Criminal Chamber of the Audiencia Nacional, replacing Javier Gómez Bermúdez.

On 29 November 2013, he was appointed a member of the General Council of the Judiciary, at the proposal of the People's Party, by the Senate.

=== Minister of the Interior ===
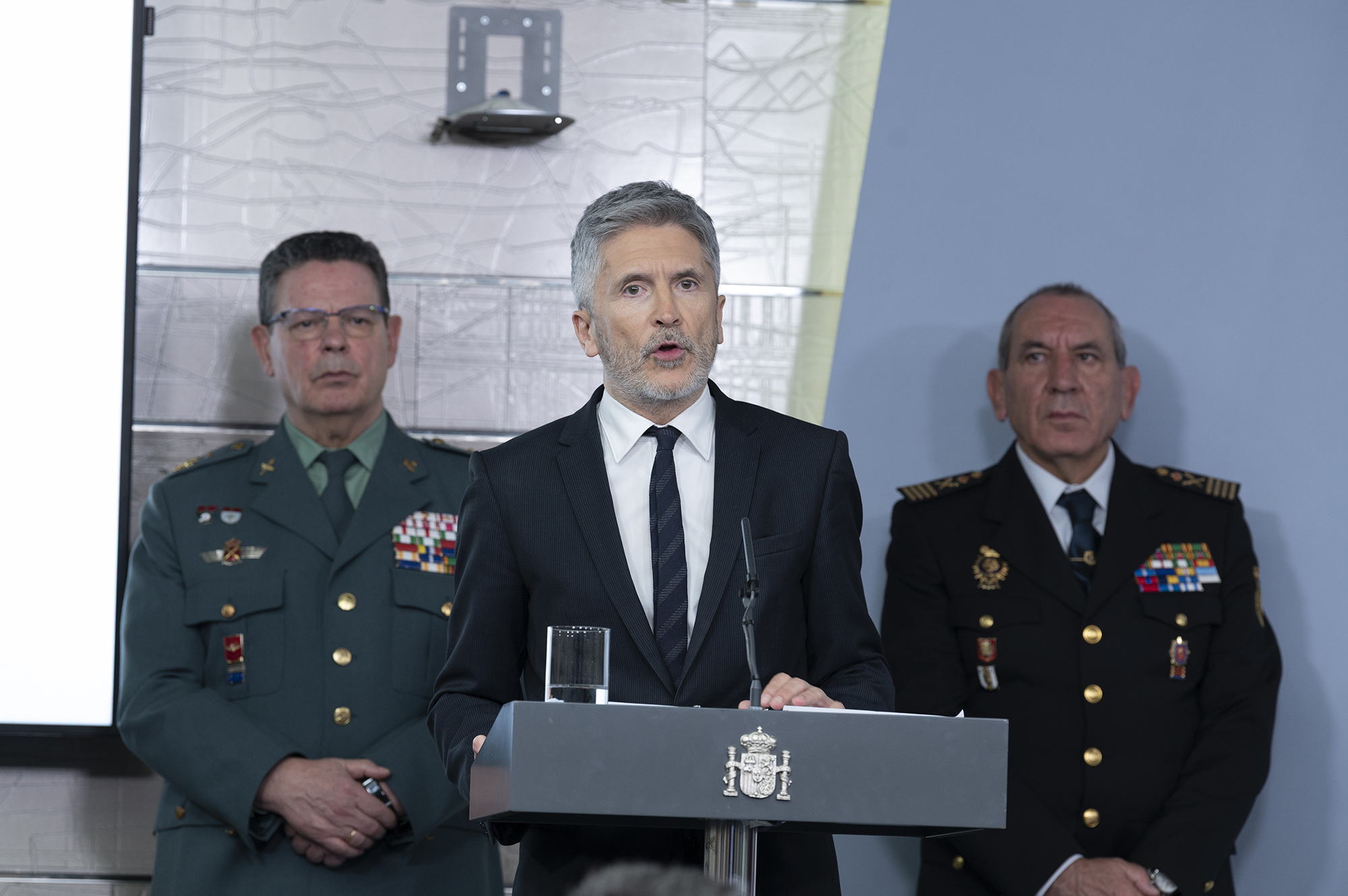
Minister Grande-Marlaska, along with the Deputy Directors of Operations of the State police forces, in a press conference during the COVID-19 pandemic lockdown in Spain.

In 2018, the President of the Government of Spain, Pedro Sánchez, appointed Grande-Marlaska as Minister of the Interior. Briefly after assuming the office, Grande-Marlaska announced his intention of removing the barbed wire on fences between Morocco and the Spanish cities of Ceuta and Melilla. In January 2019, the Council of Ministers approved the "Plan for the Reinforcement and Modernization of the Terrestrial Border Protection System in Ceuta and Melilla" with a value of 32 million euros, which also included extending the height of the fences and introducing new technological elements. Specifically, the sole withdrawal of the barbed wire is valued at 18 million. The removal of the barbed wire and the border security measures upgrade started in December 2019. On 17 February 2020, the minister announced before the Congress of Deputies' Home Affairs Committee that the fences would be raised by 30%, around 10 meters.

On 14 March 2020, the Council of Ministers approved a "State of Alarm" due to the coronavirus pandemic in Spain. That measure gave the central government extraordinary powers to directly control the regional and local administrations and establish some constitutional rights restrictions. Prime Minister Pedro Sánchez appointed Grande-Marlaska as one of the four "delegated competent authorities" and gave him the command over all state, regional and local law enforcement agencies as well as the power to close all needed roads and borders. In the use of these extraordinary powers, on 15 March 2020 the minister issued an order to all police forces to apply, in case of non-compliance by citizens with the measures established by the government, article 36.6 of the 2015 Law on Citizen Security which establishes fines of between €100 and €600,000 and, in case of severe disobedience, articles 550 to 556 of the Criminal Code, which establishes jail sentences up to 4 years.

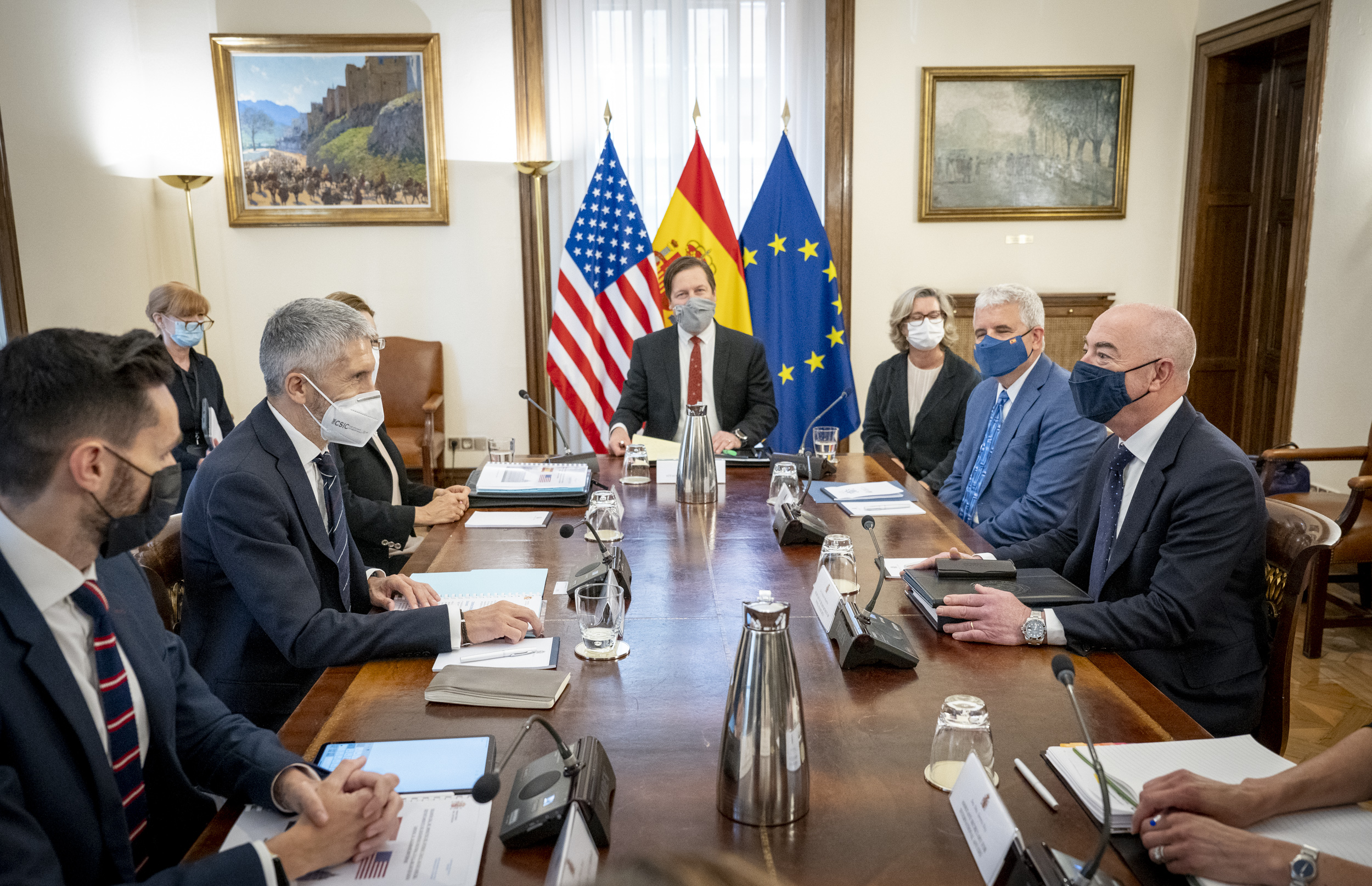
Grande-Marlaska participating in a bilateral meeting with US Homeland Security Secretary Alejandro Mayorkas in Madrid, on 23 June 2021.

During the immigration crisis in May 2019, thousands of migrants crossed the Spanish-Moroccan border in Ceuta; Grande-Marlaska in turn announced a firm stance to "defend Spanish soil" by means of a reinforcement of 200 new Civil Guard officers sent over to the border, as well as the devolution of 2,700 people back to Morocco. On the issue of unaccompanied minors who had made their way into Ceuta illegally, the minister supported in August 2019 the attempt to send them back "for their own benefit", considering that they were not vulnerable and the expulsion did not pose a threat to them.

In June 2026, during a meeting of the European Union's Justice and Home Affairs Council, Grande-Marlaska supported reviewing the EU's migration framework, arguing that the Temporary Protection Directive could not serve as a long-term solution for Ukrainian refugees. He stated that the European Union must develop a unified, common approach and emphasized that future policies should focus on effective integration, continued protection, and facilitating voluntary returns to Ukraine once a just and lasting peace is achieved.

== Controversies ==
=== Inaction on torture and police brutality ===
The European Court of Human Rights had issued by 2016 a total of eight verdicts condemning Spain for failing to investigate alleged torture and police brutality on detainees, five of which happened under the custody of Grande-Marlaska. According to lawyer Amaia Izko, who represented four of the victims "[...] we proved the judge did nothing to investigate or impede the torture and police brutality [occurring] while the detainees were held incommunicado. There are many more such cases. I have represented hundreds of people who denounced being tortured [by the police] while awaiting trial under judge Grande-Marlaska."

According Izko's clients, Grande-Marlaska often ignored the detainees' claims with "an openly mocking attitude". Some of the claims also denounced rape/sexual assault and homophobic attacks. Igor Portu and Mattin Sarasola, militants of ETA subjected to torture by the Guardia Civil according to the 2018 ECtHR verdict, were stripped naked and beaten for five days while incommunicado until Portu had to be taken to the hospital in critical condition. The Council of Europe confirmed that both detainees were subjected to inhuman and degrading treatment.

On 9 March 2021, Grande-Marlaska refused in the Congress of Deputies to declassify secret files that could reveal further incriminatory evidence pointing to the death of Mikel Zabalza as a result of torture while on Civil Guard's custody in 1985, following recordings with detailed internal accounts of Zabalza's death re-published by the daily Público; the minister reminded instead that Spanish Justice has dismissed the case by now.

On 7 March 2022, the minister dismissed accusations of police brutality following TV footage showing Civil Guard border officers battering and pepper-spraying a person jumping the security fence bordering on Morocco as he came down on the Spanish side, instead elaborating on the level of violence and injuries allegedly sustained by 60 guards during the attempts of the migrants to cross the border into Spain.

== Personal life ==
Grande-Marlaska is openly gay and has been a long time activist against gay bullying. He is married since 2005 to his longtime partner, Gorka Gómez.

Political offices
Preceded by Juan Ignacio Zoido	Minister of the Interior; 2018–present	Incumbent
