= Mikel Zabalza Garate =

Basque bus driver

Miquel Zabalza
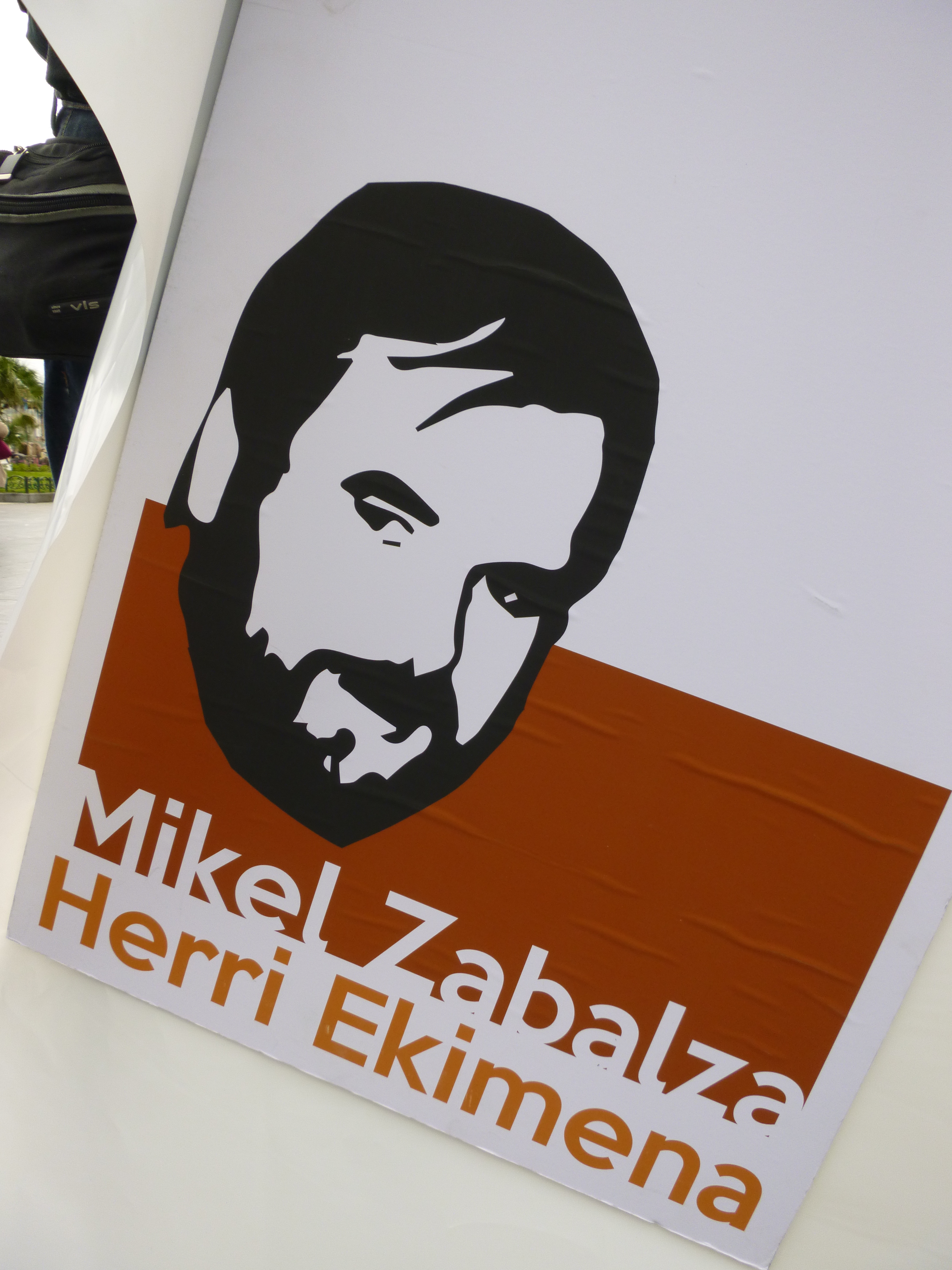

Mikel Zabalza Garate, also known as Mikel Zabaltza Garate, (Note: The most common spelling is Mikel Zabalza, nevertheless, the Euskaltzaindia uses Mikel Zabaltza for academic purposes.) (Orbaizeta, c. 1952 – Intxaurrondo barracks, San Sebastián, November 26, 1985) was a Basque bus driver, and employee of the San Sebastian Municipal Trolley Service. In 1985, he appeared dead in the river Bidasoa. After 35 years of inaction by the Spanish tribunals, it was concluded that Zabalza died as result of torture inflicted on him by Civil Guard operatives at the headquarters of Intxaurrondo in San Sebastián.

== Detention and murder ==
Ion Arretxe's testimony, arrested with Zabalza and subjected also to torture

On the night of November 26, 1985, agents of the Information Service of the Spanish Guardia Civil detained Zabalza in the Altza neighborhood of San Sebastían, where he lived. The operation took place as part of an antiterrorist operation after ETA committed a fatal attack against two officers of the Spanish Army and a Guardia Civil agent. During that operation, Zabalza's partner, Idoia Ajerdi (Idoia Aierbe), his cousin Manuel Vizcay (Manolo Bizkai) and the student Ion Arretxe were also detained. They later declared they had been tortured during 8 days of detention in the Intxaurrondo barracks, but these cases did not succeed in the courts.

In Orbaizeta, two of Zabalza's brothers, Patxi and Aitor, were also detained and then released after 10 days. A few days later, Zabalza's mother, noticing that all of the detainees had been released except for her son, went to the barracks to ask about his situation and the civil guard at the door responded that if she had lost a son, she should go to the "lost and found". Years later, in 2016, this cynical response became the name of a report about the case.

A few days later, the authorities responsible for Zabalza's police custody announced that he had escaped by jumping into the river Bidasoa at the point where it passes through the town of Endarlatsa, in the municipality of Lesaka, when he was being driven to identify an ETA hideout, which was never found. On December 15, twenty days after his detention, his handcuffed body appeared, in the channel of the stretch of the Bidasoa where he allegedly disappeared. It was precisely in this place where people had looked for him daily and where the Red Cross had halted the search the day before.

According to the newspaper El Mundo (2004), some witnesses said that the young Basque man had been subjected to an intense interrogation and his death was caused by the "bathtub" method of torture, in which the detainee is submerged in a bathtub full of water, making it almost impossible for him to breathe, in an attempt to get a statement from him.

With respect to his alleged activity within ETA, both the Basque armed organization as well as the Spanish Minister of the Interior, Jose Barrionuevo, denied he had ever been a member or collaborator.

== Trial ==
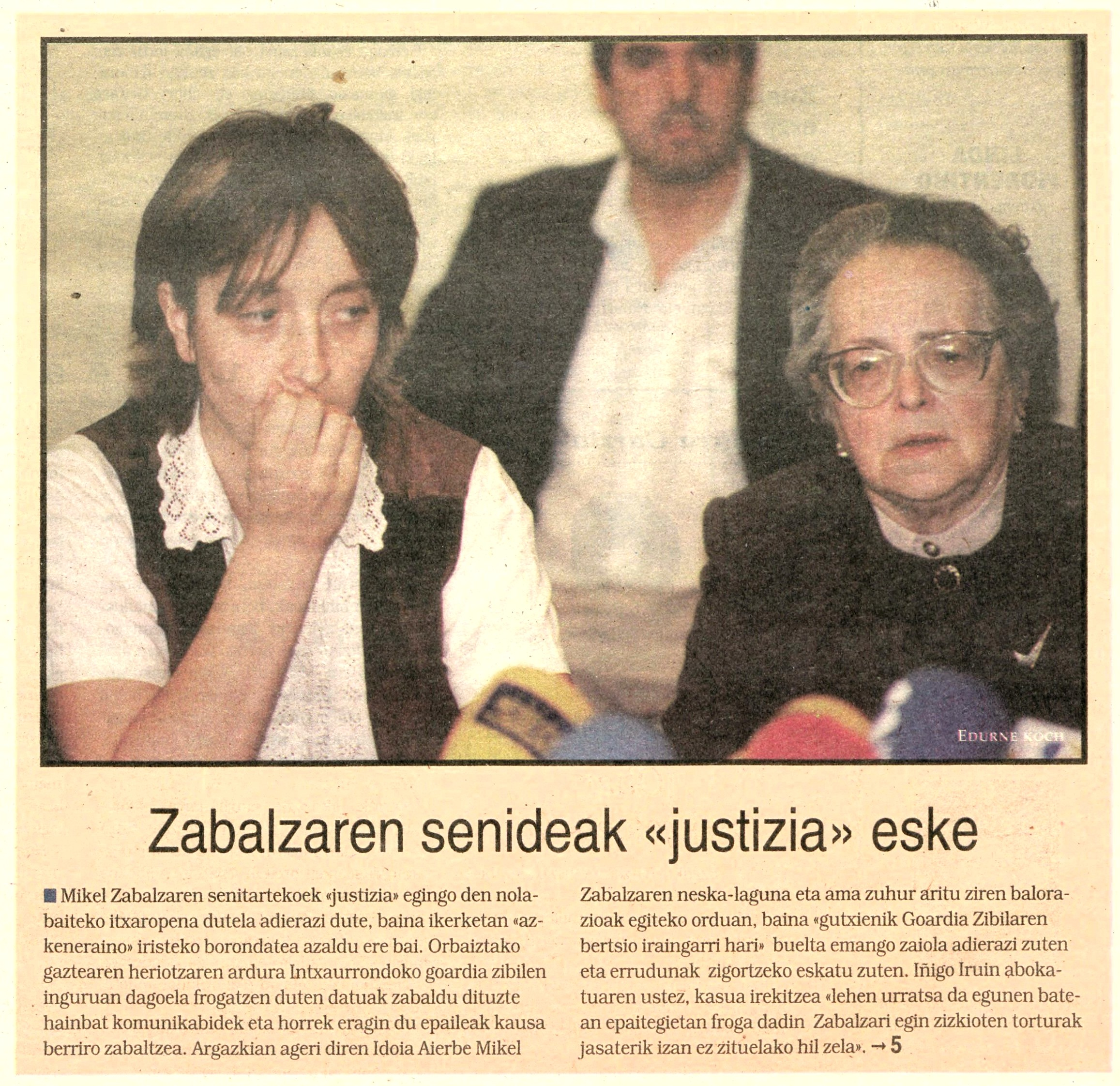
Sister and mother demanding justice (daily Egunkaria, 1995)

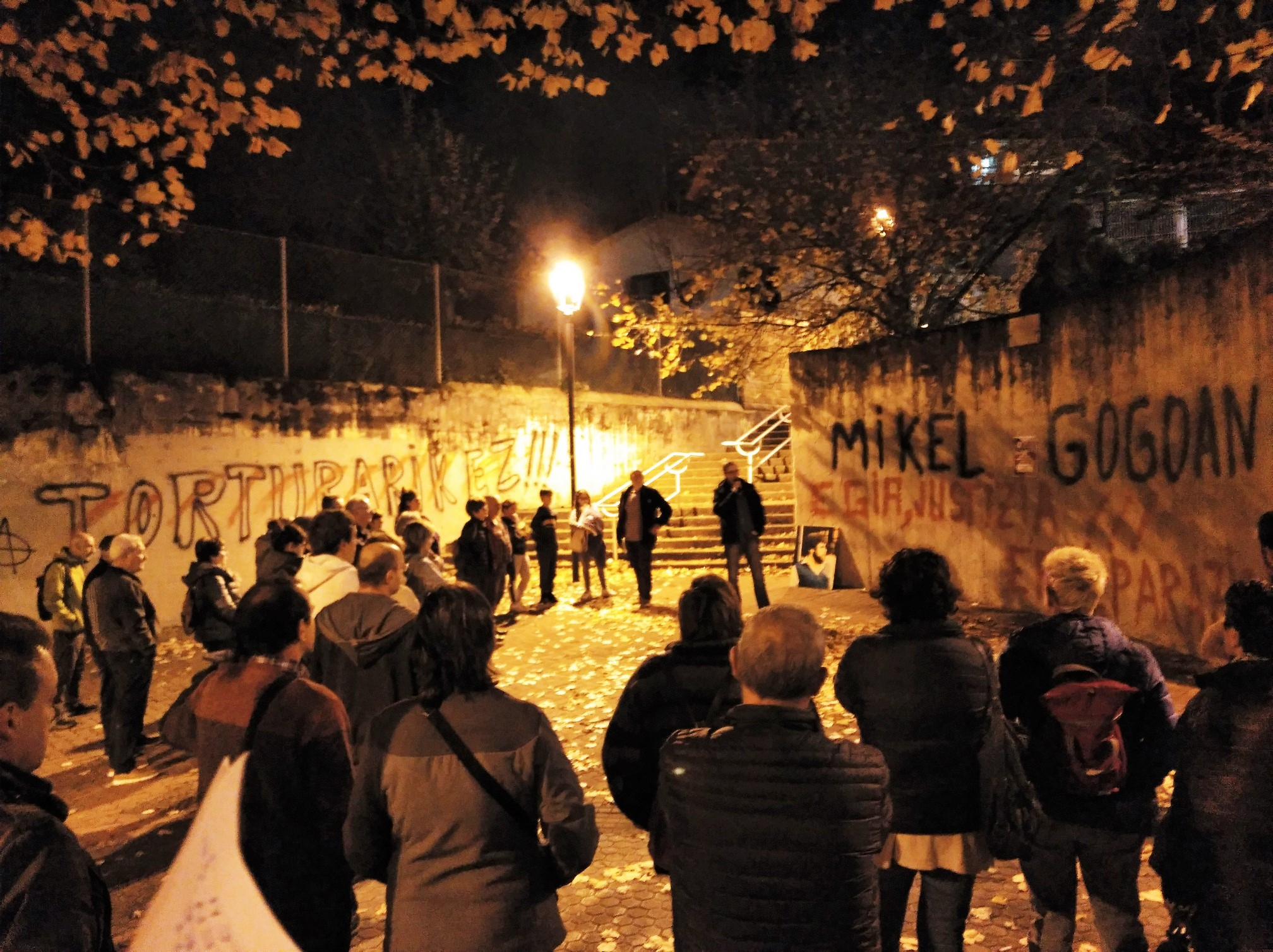
Tribute to Mikel Zabalza prior to official recognition (2019)

The Guardia Civil agents responsible for his custody (lieutenants Gonzalo Pérez García and Arturo Espejo Valero, and the guard Fernando Castañeda Valls) were prosecuted during the first phase of the investigation. Nevertheless, in 1988, the Guipúscoa Local Court closed the case due to lack of evidence. Pérez García was later promoted to colonel. In 1985, the journalist José Macca, at Diario 16, published the confession of the former Guardia Civil agent Vicente Soria asserting that he had seen Zabalza's corpse in an elevator in the Intxaurrondo barracks.

After several journalistic investigations that indicated that the actual cause of his death was torture, the case was reopened. This time, in 2000, the smuggler Pedro Luis Miguéliz Dabadie («Txofo») testified in a trial in San Sebastián that the former Guardia Civil Enrique Dorado Villalobos had told him that Zabaltza had died in the barracks during the detention, after torture inflicted by himself and the also former agent Felipe Bayo Leal, both of whom were convicted first in the Lasa and Zabala case. Regardless, the judge decided that there still wasn't enough evidence to convict them, and closed the case. In addition, a recording came to light between the former colonel Juan Alberto Perote and the captain Pedro Gómez Nieto, in which they say:

They went overboard with Zabaltza, they lost him during the interrogation. They will never figure out what happened. It's possible that he had a heart attack as a consequence of the plastic bag over his head.

And also:

The point of the thing is not that he can't see anything... the hood has to be transparent so that he can see life and have the full sensation that death is taking him.

On March 1, 2021, all of the political parties in the Navarre Parliament joined to demand an investigation into Zabalza's death:

"The Parliament of Navarre demands, that, given the publication of the recordings of the Captain Gómez Nieto of the Guardia Civil and the then Chief Colonel of the Centro Superior de Información de la Defensa (CESID) Juan Alberto Perote, they should be thoroughly investigated with the objective of finding out the truth about the death" of Zabalza.

Bakartxo Ruiz, the spokesperson for EH Bildu noted that the recordings "make clear not just what happened in individual circumstances, but also suggest what everyone in this country knows: that torture has been used systematically with political objectives and has been hidden with absolute impunity". The CNI refused to reveal classified documentation referring to the case Zabalza, considering "that it would be illegal".

== Tributes and acknowledgements ==
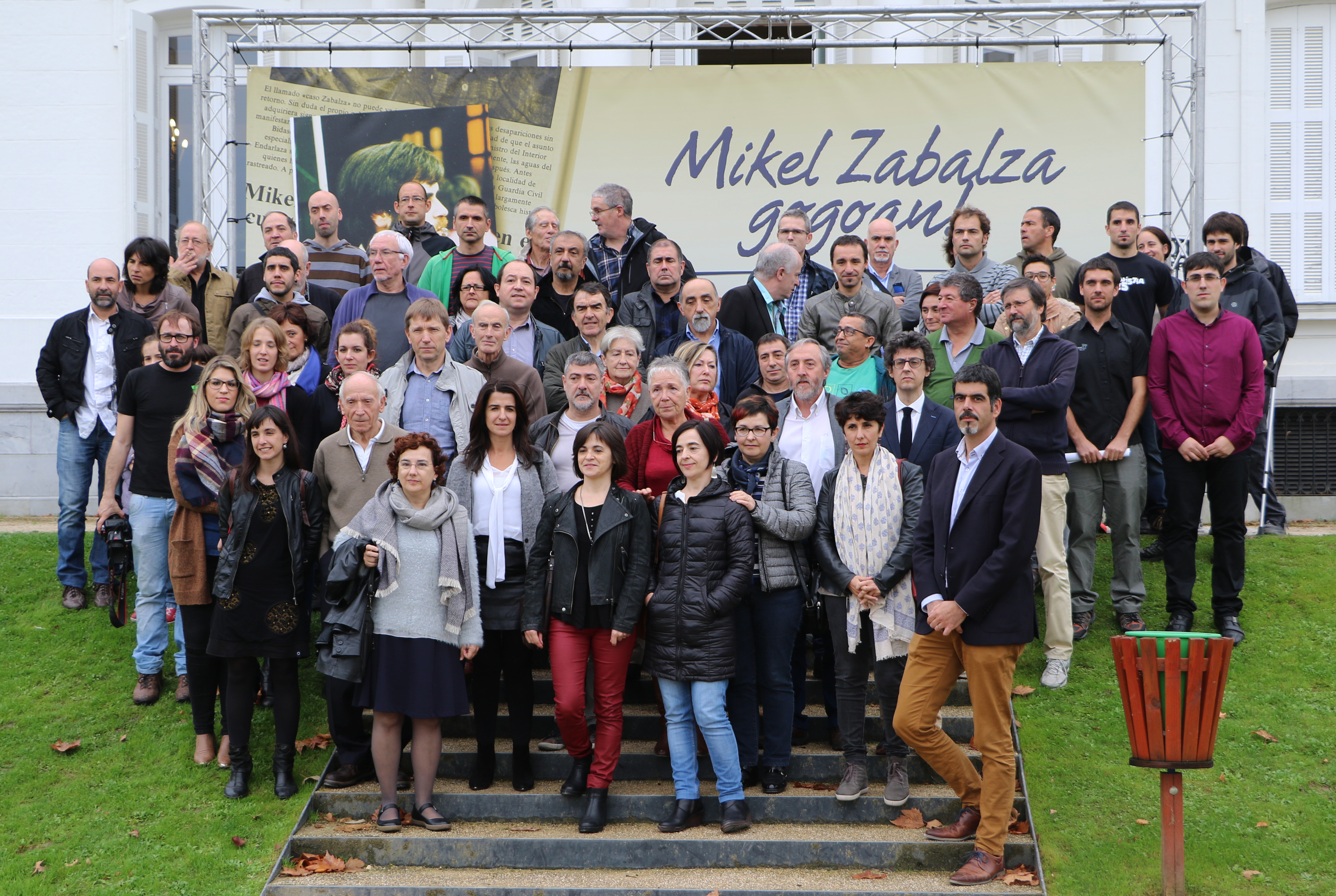
Presentation of the documentary Galdutako objektuak (Lost and Found).

Graffiti painting process for the memorial to Zabalza and against torture, Donostia-San Sebastián

On December 11, 1986, the Central Court of Instruction, number 1 of the Spanish National Court decided to prosecute the former directors of the newspapers Avui and Segre, Jaume Serrats and Ramon Perelló respectively, for an alleged crime of glorifying terrorism. The case originated in events that took place the previous year, on December 17, when they had published in both papers the death notices of Mikel Zabalza and Quim Sànchez, a Catalan pro-independence political activist who died when working with explosives. As part of the same case, Juli Palou i Mínguez, Ismael Durà i Guimerà, Joaquim Roig i Ortiz, and Josep Ramon Freixes i Sentís, all of whom were members of pro-independence organizations and parties PSAN, MDT, IPC and CSPC were accused of paying for the announcements. In the end, the court freed all the defendants without bail, but fined each of them 500,000 pesetas.

The Mikel Zabalza Gogoan ('Remembering Mikel Zabalza') platform is a group of family members, friends and social activists of the young man who joined to demand justice for Mikel's death and to keep his memory alive. In 2016, the platform published the documentary Galdutako objektuak ("Lost and found") about the events surrounding his murder. The title of the work comes from the response that his mother, Garbiñe Gárate, received when she went to the door of the barracks to ask where her son was: “If you're saying you lost your son, go look in the lost and found.”

On January 10, 2019, the Navarre Government held a conference titled “Weaving memory” to encourage the remembrance of victims of extreme-right and civil servant violence, like Mikel Zabalza, Germán Rodríguez, Gladys del Estal and José Luis Cano. This event took place after several failed judicial attempts to place these victims on the same level as victims of ETA or francoism. With respect to the various failed judicial attempts, last summer, the Spanish Constitutional Court annulled almost the entire Navarre law of 2015 that recognized and sought to give reparations to victims of far-right violence. Similarly, earlier in the week, the High Court of Justice in Navarre paralyzed the calling of grants to universities that document cases of torture and abuse by these groups.

September 2020 saw the premiere of the documentary Non dago Mikel? ('Where is Mikel?'), directed by Amaia Merino and Miguel Ángel Llamas «Pitu», at the San Sebastián International Film Festival. The work covers in detail the events that occurred around the young bus driver's detention and includes testimony from three generations of the Zabalza family. The title comes from a placard which read "The bus driver isn't here. Where is he?”, created by his colleagues at the municipal transportation company and which hung in a San Sebastián bus shortly after his disappearance.

=== Agoitz mural ===
On April 25, 2016, the Spanish delegate to Navarre Carmen Alba sent a letter demanding that the city council in Agoitz eliminate, within the month, a mural in homage to the murdered young man, which had been painted two or three years earlier in the Market Square. The notification was sent after the Spanish Civil Guard found and denounced the mural, which included the text “Mikel Zabalza gogoan! Tortura 1960-2013: 3587 tortura salaketa Euskal Herrian Aztnugal” (In English 'Remembering Mikel Zabalza! Torture 1960-2013: 3587 complaints of torture in the Basque Country "Aztnugal" (Note: «Aztnugal» is «Laguntza» backwards, that is, 'Help'.)'). The Delegration based her demand for the mural's removal on the “instruction of the National Court prosecutor of July 7, 2009" which required “the removal of all symbols related to the ETA terrorist organization" since its "exhibition could be considered a crime of glorifying terrorism". At the same time, she warned that if the mural was not removed, she would take "necessary measures".

Many voices spoke out with surprise and indignation at the accusation of ties with ETA. The president of the Navarre Government, Uxue Barkos, said she hoped that it had been a “slip”, borne of “ignorance" of the case and hoped that it would be solved “with common sense and by the initiative of the Delegate of the Government". The spokesperson for the political group EH Bildu, Adolfo Araiz, denounced the “private crusade” that the Spanish Government Delegation “was leading against those who denounce torture” and repeated his demand that the delegate resign. Another reaction to the letter came from the local representative of the Spanish People's Party, Javier García, who said that “the only thing that the Delegate was doing was demand that the current law be followed” which requires «that any graffiti or symobology linked with the terrorist network must be removed».

On May 12, 2016, the Delegation put out a communiqué attempting to justify the demand by saying that "at no time was Mikel Zabalza tied, related to or accused of belonging to ETA” and that the attempt of the demand was to eliminate the mural which included the words "torture" and "aztnugal" in order to “avoid continuing the accusation against the Security Forces and Bodies of the State, generally and unjustifiably, of practicing torture”. The next day, the victim's sister, Idoia Zabalza, the mayor of Agoitz, Unai Lako, the mayor of Orbaizeta, Sergio Mujika, the president of the Valley of Aezkoa, Félix Jamar, together with family members and members of the Mikel Zabalza Gogoan platform, held a press conference in Pamplona to say that Mikel Zabalza «is on the side of victims of violence” and criticized the Delegation for “trying to confuse issues more than clear them up”. The mayor of Agoitz said that the local government would not erase the mural and would appeal the second legal demand. He also announced that there would be an extraordinary plenary session on May 17 at 7pm to debate the possible celebration, on May 21 at 7:30pm, of a demonstration to reject the legal demand about the controversial mural.

=== Where is Mikel? (Non dago Mikel?) ===
In 2020, Amaia Merino and Miguel Angel Llamas filmed the documentary Where is Mikel? (Non dago Mikel?) which tells the story of Zabalza's disappearance as he was detained by Spain's Civil Guard who had confused him with a member of ETA. During the 20 days Zabalza's whereabouts were unknown, the lack of trust of the Basque people in the official version of the story led to massive protests. Despite the recordings of the Guardia Civil agents explaining their role in his torture and murder, no one was ever tried or punished for his death. The film was screened at the San Sebastian International Film Festival in 2020, shortly before the 35th anniversary of his death. His family continues to demand justice for what happened.
