= Amaia Merino =

Spanish actress

- Born: 6 December 1970 (age 55); San Sebastián, Basque County
- Citizenship: Spain, Ecuador
- Occupation: Actress

Amaia Merino Unzueta (b. 6 December 1970, San Sebastián) is a Basque Spanish actress. Her brother, Aitor Merino, is also an actor. She has lived in Ecuador since 1993.

== Biography ==
Amaia Merino was born in San Sebastián on 6 December 1970, but grew up in Pamplona and studied filmmaking in Madrid. She debuted as an actress with Pedro Olea's 1984 film Akelarre and Montxo Armendáriz's Tasio, then as a director with the 2013 documentary Asier ETA biok.
