= Gabriela Bustelo =

Spanish author, journalist and translator

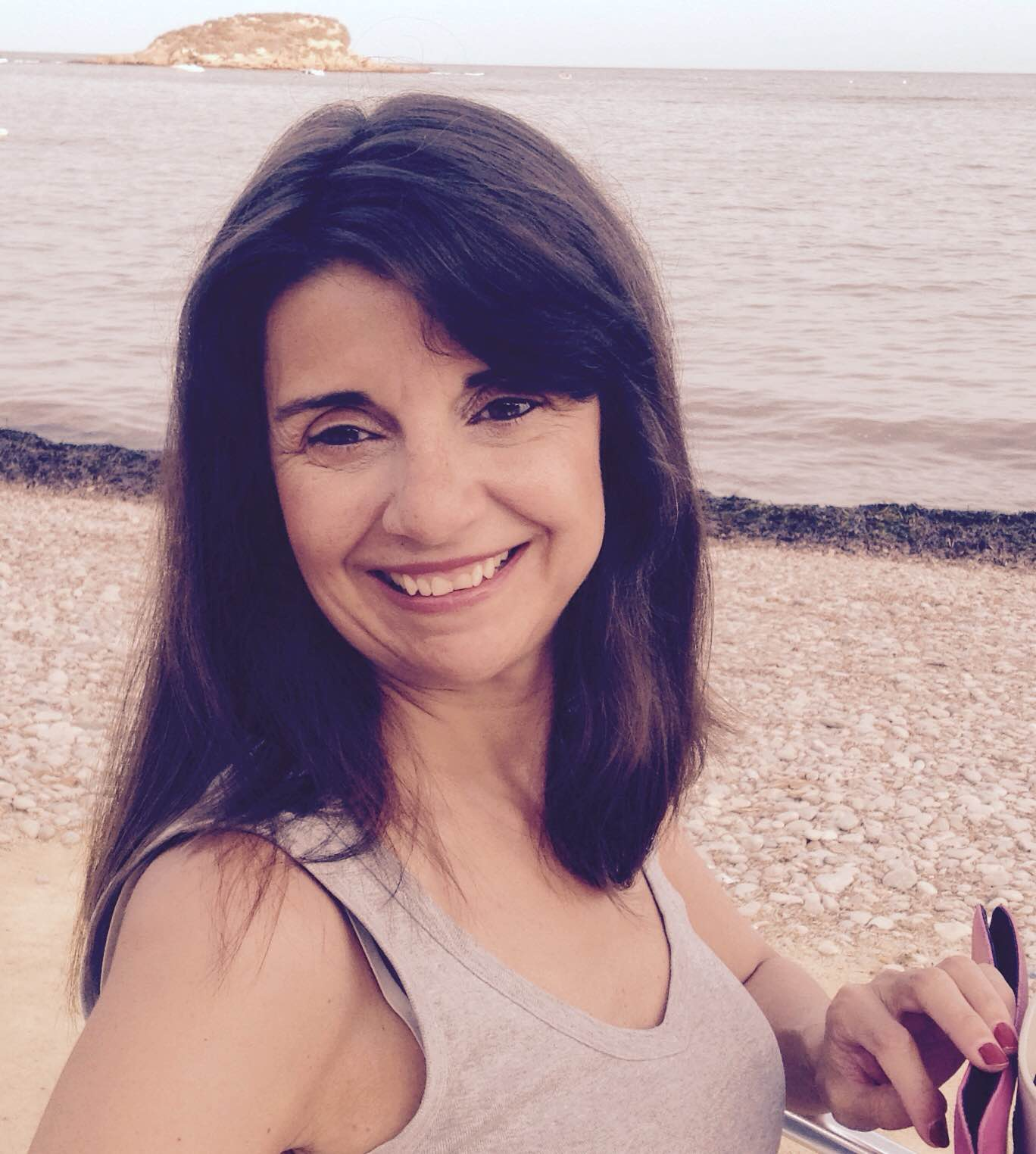
- Bustelo at Altea, summer of 2014
- Born: May 18, 1962 (age 64); Madrid, Spain
- Education: Complutense University of Madrid
- Occupations: Writer, Journalist.
- Writing career
- Period: 1996-present
- Genres: Dirty realism, Science fiction, Postmodern literature, Roman-a-clef
- Literary movement: Generation X (Spain)

Gabriela Bustelo (Madrid, 1962) is a Spanish author, journalist and translator.

== Biography ==
Included in the 1990 neorealist generation of Spanish novelists, Bustelo made her debut with Veo Veo (Anagrama, 1996), which placed her in the literary Generation X She shares with José Ángel Mañas, Ray Loriga and Lucía Etxebarria a sharp literary style influenced by commercial culture — advertising, pop music, film and television. Gabriela Bustelo is one of the few Spanish women who have written science fiction. Her second novel Planeta Hembra (RBA, 2001), located in New York, is a dystopia that envisaged —almost two decades ago— the underlying conflict between women and men that in the 21st century has become the MeToo Movement as a global battle of the sexes. La historia de siempre jamás (El Andén, 2007) portrays the immorality and shallowness of European political elites. In 1996, she began to write pieces on art and culture for publications such as Vogue and Gala (magazine), having penned political columns for fifteen years in national print media and digital newspapers. She contributed cultural articles to Colombian magazine "Arcadia" (revistaarcadia.com) from 2005 to 2015.

== Translations ==
Bustelo has translated to Spanish the works of classics such as Charles Dickens, George Eliot, Rudyard Kipling, Oscar Wilde, Edgar Allan Poe and Mark Twain; and well-known contemporaries including Raymond Chandler, Muriel Spark and Margaret Atwood.

== See also ==
- Spanish Literature
- Science-fiction
- Translation
- Dystopia
- Neorealism (art)
