= Out in the Open (film) =

- Theatrical release poster
- Spanish: Intemperie
- Directed by: Benito Zambrano
- Written by: Daniel Remón; Pablo Remón; Benito Zambrano
- Based on: Intemperie by Jesús Carrasco
- Starring: Luis Tosar; Luis Callejo; Jaime López
- Cinematography: Pau Esteve Birba
- Edited by: Nacho Ruiz Capillas
- Production companies: Morena Films; Intemperie La Película AIE; Aralan Films; Ukbar Filmes
- Distributed by: A Contracorriente Films
- Release dates: 19 October 2019 (Seminci); 22 November 2019 (Spain)
- Running time: 103 min
- Countries: Spain; Portugal
- Language: Spanish

Out in the Open (Spanish: Intemperie) is a 2019 Spanish-Portuguese thriller film directed by Benito Zambrano which stars Luis Tosar, Luis Callejo and Jaime López. It is an adaptation of the 2013 novel Intemperie by Jesús Carrasco.

== Plot ==
The Western-like fiction is set in Andalusia in 1946. A kid chased by men on behalf of the local overseer finds a shepherd offering him protection.

== Cast ==
- Luis Tosar as shepherd
- Jaime López as the kid
- Luis Callejo as overseer
- Vicente Romero as Triana.
- Manolo Caro
- Kandido Uranga
- Mona Martínez
- Miguel Flor de Lima
- Yoima Valdés
- María Alfonsa Rosso
- Adriano Carvalho
- Juanan Lumbreras
- Carlos Cabra
- Juanjo Pérez Yuste

== Production ==
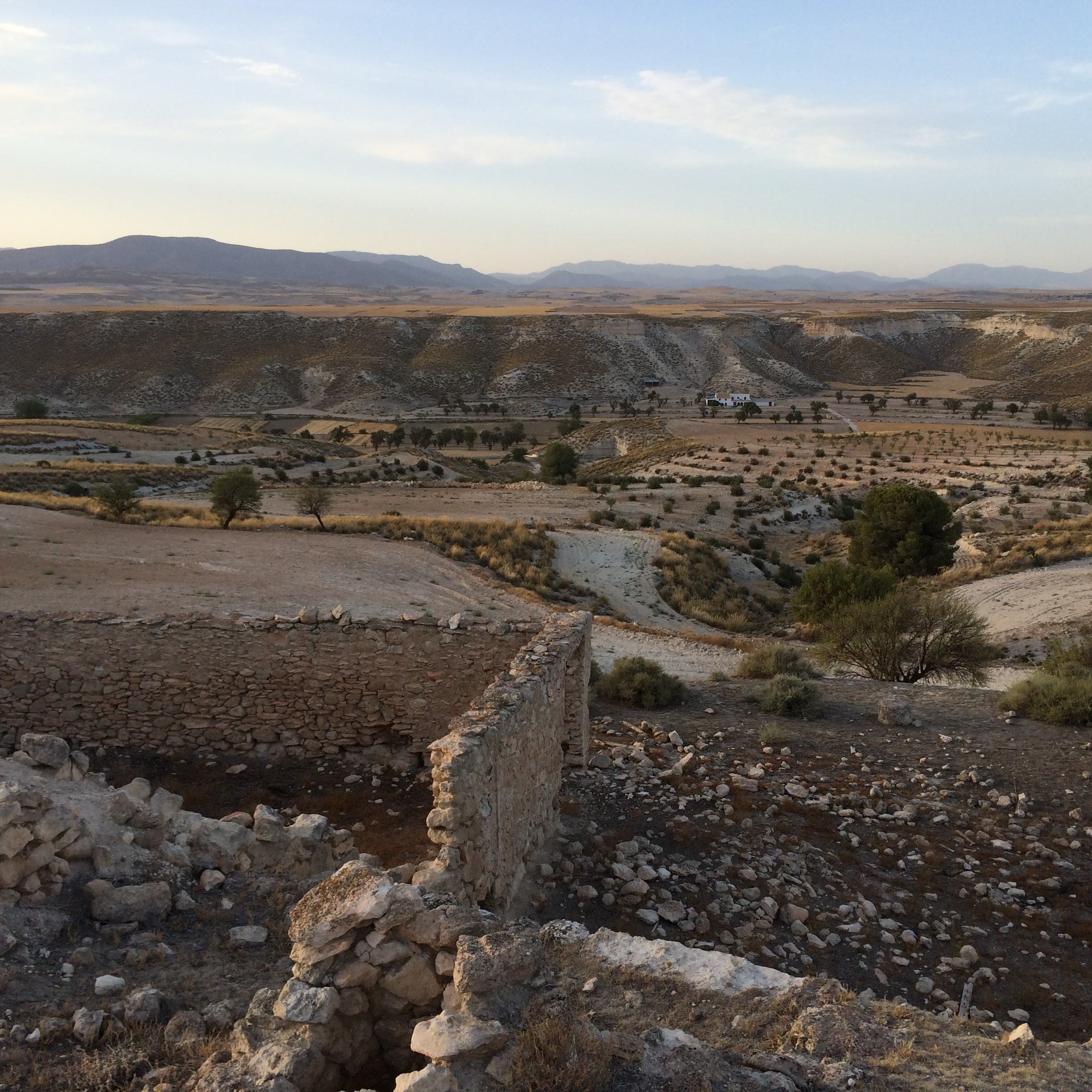
The film displays the Granadan highlands as backdrop.

Adapted by Daniel Remón, Pablo Remón and Benito Zambrano, the screenplay is based on the 2013 novel Intemperie by Jesús Carrasco.

A Spain–Portugal co-production, the film was produced by Morena Films alongside Intemperie La Película AIE, Aralan Films and Ukbar Filmes and it had the participation of RTVE and Movistar+.

Featuring the arid landscapes of the northeast of the province of Granada as a backdrop, shooting lasted from July to August 2018. Shooting locations included the municipalities of Orce, Galera, Castril and Puebla de Don Fadrique.

== Release ==
Out in the Open had its world premiere at the 64th Valladolid International Film Festival (Seminci) on 19 October 2019, as the official selection's opener. It also screened at the 16th Seville European Film Festival (SEFF) on 9 November 2019. Distributed by A Contracorriente Films, the film was theatrically released in Spain on 22 November 2019.

== Accolades ==
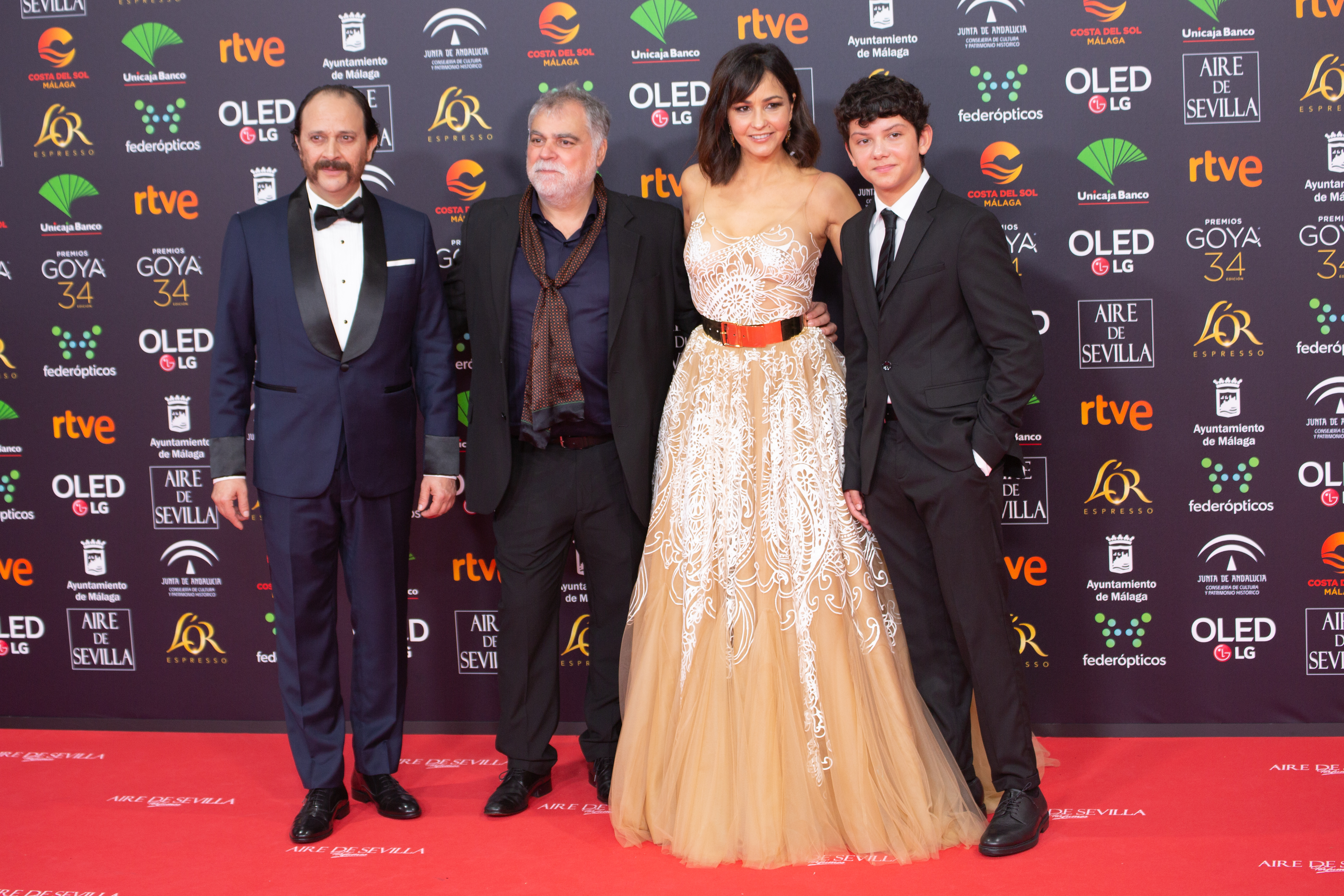
Crew and cast members at the red carpet of the 34th Goya Awards. From left to right: Luis Callejo, Benito Zambrano, Yoima Valdés and Jaime López.

Year	Award	Category	Nominee(s)	Result	Ref.
2020	75th CEC Medals	Best Film		Nominated	
2020	75th CEC Medals	Best Director	Benito Zambrano	Nominated	
2020	75th CEC Medals	Best Actor	Luis Tosar	Nominated	
2020	75th CEC Medals	Best Supporting Actor	Luis Callejo	Nominated	
2020	75th CEC Medals	Best New Actor	Jaime López	Nominated	
2020	75th CEC Medals	Best Adapted Screenplay	Pablo Remón, Daniel Remón, Benito Zambrano	Nominated	
2020	34th Goya Awards	Best Film		Nominated	
2020	34th Goya Awards	Best Adapted Screenplay	Benito Zambrano, Daniel Remón, Pablo Remón	Won	
2020	34th Goya Awards	Best Original Song	"Intemperie" by Javier Ruibal	Won	
2020	34th Goya Awards	Best Supporting Actor	Luis Callejo	Nominated	
2020	34th Goya Awards	Best Production Supervision	Manolo Limón	Nominated	

== See also ==
- List of Spanish films of 2019
- List of Portuguese films of 2019
