= Stories from the Kronen =

1995 film

- Film poster
- Spanish: Historias del Kronen
- Directed by: Montxo Armendáriz
- Screenplay by: Montxo Armendáriz; José Ángel Mañas
- Based on: Historias del Kronen by José Ángel Mañas
- Produced by: Alfred Hürmer; Claudie Ossard; Elías Querejeta
- Starring: Juan Diego Botto; Jordi Mollá; Nuria Prims; Aitor Merino
- Cinematography: Alfredo F. Mayo
- Edited by: Rosario Sáinz de Rozas
- Production companies: Elías Querejeta PC; Claudie Ossard Productions; Alert Film GmbH
- Distributed by: Alta Films (es)
- Release date: 29 April 1995 (Spain)
- Running time: 95 minutes
- Countries: Spain; France; Germany
- Language: Spanish

Stories from the Kronen (Spanish: Historias del Kronen) is a 1995 drama film directed by Montxo Armendáriz based on the novel of the same name by José Ángel Mañas, which stars Juan Diego Botto and Jordi Mollà.

It was entered into the 1995 Cannes Film Festival.

== Plot ==
Carlos, Roberto, Pedro and Manolo form a group of friends in their early twenties with a lot of time on their hands during their summer vacation. The point of encounter for the group of friends is a bar called the Kronen, where Manolo, the least affluent among them, works as a bar tender and is the singer of a rock band. Carlos is the leader of the pack. He is handsome, selfish, amoral and hedonistic. He is in into a restless pursuing of pleasure: drinking, using heavy drugs, partying and having sex. Nothing seems to stop him. At Kronen Carlos rekindles a relationship with Amalia, an ex-girlfriend whose current boyfriend is coincidentally out of town. Amalia joins the group attracted by Carlos' good looks and charm. Roberto is Carlos' best friend and sidekick. He plays the drums in the band where Manolo sings. More serious and more scrupulous than Carlos, Roberto has repressed homosexual feelings towards his best friend.

When they go to see Roberto's favorite film, Henry: Portrait of a Serial Killer, Roberto is aroused when he sees Carlos sexually playing in the dark with his girlfriend. Pedro is the weakest member of the group. He has serious health issues, he lost a kidney and is a diabetic, being the most vulnerable, Carlos takes advantage of him and bullies him constantly, making fun of his delicacy.

An argument at Kronen between Pedro and a stranger is resolved by trying between them who can stand for more time to be hanging dangerously from a bridge over a highway. The incident is stopped by the police and Carlos and Pedro are detained. Carlos's father is a lawyer and he gets the two friends out of jail soon. Family relationships are not important for Carlos. During his parents wedding anniversary Carlos's sister despair with her brother lack of interest for family relationships and wild behavior, sleeping by day and partying heavily by night. Carlos relates only to his old an ailing grandfather, who had served as something of a mentor to him, but he dies.

To celebrate his birthday, Pedro invites his friends to his house for a party, but he dies as the result of having been forced by Carlos to drink a bottle of scotch.

== Cast ==
- Juan Diego Botto as Carlos
- Jordi Mollá as Roberto
- Nuria Prims as Amalia
- Aitor Merino as Pedro
- Armando del Río as Manolo
- Mercedes Sampietro as Carlos's mother
- André Falcon as Carlos's grandfather
- José María Pou as Carlos's father
- Cayetana Guillén Cuervo as Carlos's sister
- Diana Gálvez as Silvia (Note: Gálvez died in a car crash, age 24, before the film's theatrical release.)
- Iñaki Méndez as Miguel

== Production ==
The film is a Spanish-French-German co-production by Elías Querejeta PC, Claudie Ossard Productions and Alert Film GmbH, and it had the participation of TVE and Canal+.

== Accolades ==
Year	Award	Category	Nominee(s)	Result	Ref.
1996	10th Goya Awards	Best Adapted Screenplay	Montxo Armendáriz & José Ángel Mañas	Won	
1996	10th Goya Awards	Best New Actor	Juan Diego Botto	Nominated	

== See also ==
- List of Spanish films of 1995

== Bibliography ==
- D’Lugo, Marvin: Guide to the Cinema of Spain, Greenwood Press, 1997. ISBN 0-313-29474-7
