= Gonzalo Torrente Malvido =

Spanish novelist, screenwriter, and writer

Gonzalo Torrente Malvido (1935–2011) was a Spanish novelist, screenwriter, and writer.
