= Jesús Carrasco =

Spanish writer

- Born: 1972 (age 53–54); Olivenza, Extremadura, Spain
- Occupation: Writer
- Writing career
- Notable works: Intemperie (2013), La tierra que pisamos (2016), Llévame a casa (2021)
- Notable awards: EU Prize for Literature (2016)

Jesús Carrasco, born 1972 in Olivenza, Extremadura, is a Spanish writer. He held a wide range of jobs in his youth: from physical education teacher, to grape-picker, to graphic designer. In 1992, he moved to Madrid where he began his writing career. In 2005, he moved to Seville, where he still lives.

Carrasco's debut novel Intemperie appeared in 2013 to critical acclaim, and has been translated into more than twenty languages. It won a number of prizes and was nominated for several more. The book was adapted into a film, titled Out in the Open. His second novel La tierra que pisamos (2016) won the EU Prize for Literature. His third book Llévame a casa was published in February 2021.

The relationship between humans and nature is a fundamental theme of all his novels. Carrasco has cited Raymond Carver, Richard Ford, John Updike and John Edward Williams as his primary literary influences.

== Publications ==
- Intemperie, Seix Barral, 2013.
- La tierra que pisamos, Seix Barral, 2016.
- Llévame a casa, Seix Barral, 2021.

== Translation into English ==
- Out in the Open (Intemperie), translated by Margaret Jull Costa, Vintage, 2015.
