= Isabel Moreno (politician, born 1976) =

Spanish politician (born 1976)

Member of the Congress of Deputies
- Incumbent
- Assumed office 12 December 2023
- Preceded by: Fernando Grande-Marlaska
- Constituency: Cádiz

Personal details
- Born: 26 June 1976 (age 50)
- Party: Spanish Socialist Workers' Party

María Isabel Moreno Fernández (born 26 June 1976) is a Spanish politician serving as a member of the Congress of Deputies since 2023. She has served as mayor of El Gastor since 2007.
