= Montxo Armendáriz =

Spanish filmmaker

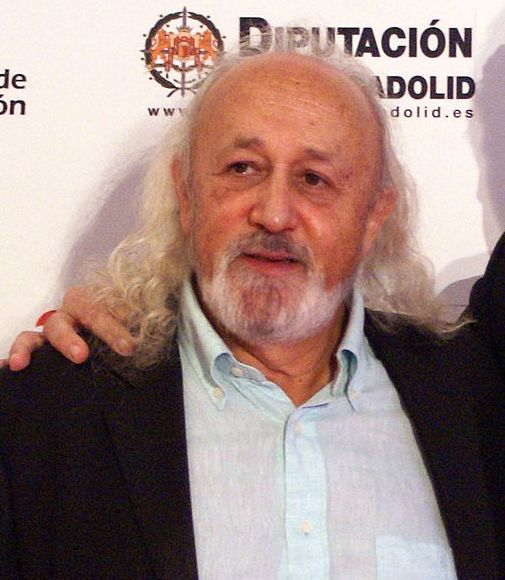
- Born: 27 January 1949 (age 77); Olleta, Orbaibar, Navarra, Spain
- Other name: Ramón Armendariz Barrios
- Occupations: Film director, screenwriter
- Years active: 1974–present

Montxo Armendariz (born as Juan Ramón Armendariz Barrios; 27 January 1949 in Olleta, Navarra, Spain) is a Spanish film director and screenwriter. His film Las cartas de Alou won at the San Sebastian Film Festival. His next film, Stories from the Kronen, an adaptation of the novel of the same name by José Ángel Mañas, was entered into the 1995 Cannes Film Festival. Secretos del corazón won several Goya Awards, the Blue Angel Award at the Berlin Film Festival and received the Academy Award nomination for Best Foreign Film.

== Early life and work ==
Born on 27 January 1949 in Olleta, Navarra. He was the last hope for his parents, who had already lost three baby sons. His father was a farmhand and blacksmith and Armendáriz spent his first year in rural Basque Country, a landscape that would reappear repeatedly in his filmography. He was six years old when, in 1955, he moved with his parents to Pamplona in search of a better life. At age eighteen, he discovered existentialism in the works of foreign authors. After completing his mandatory military service, he studied electronics, a subject he taught as university professor at the Instituto politecnico de Pamplona. Interested in filmmaking, he joined a film club, studied folklore, wrote and performed protest songs and bought a Super 8 camera to make his own short films. In 1975 he was arrested for protesting the killing of a Basque activist and faced trial on charges of conspiracy; this coincided with Franco's death and a subsequent amnesty was declared.

Eventually Armendáriz left his teaching profession behind to follow a career as film director. He joined Euskal Zinegille Elkartea, a new association of Basque filmmakers and made a series of documentary shorts on Basque topics including: Barregarriaren Dantza (Funny Dance) (1979) and Ikusmena (Landscape) (1980).

Ikusmena presents a ten-year-old girl winning a prize in a school painting competition in a narrative disruptive by flashbacks that reveal how her artistic creativity had already been stifled by censorship and social pressures. Ikusmena was a success at festivals, but it suffered the inevitability limited distribution of short films. Armendáriz turned towards the more socially relevant documentary genre and made the eleventh episode in the Ikuska series: La ribera de Navarra (The Riberbanks of Navarre) ( 1981). This he followed with Nafarrako Ikazkinack in 1981 (The Charcoal workers of Navarre), a portrait of the hard life of charcoal burners. It was while making this project that the director met Tasio Ochoa, who inspired his first feature-length film.

== Feature films ==
Tasio (1984), Armendáriz's debut as full-length feature film director, traces the generational history of the title character, a charcoal burner in the Urbasa mountains, whose threaten way of life is detail in a series of elliptical sequences in a visual style that approximates ethnographic cinema. Produced by Elias Querejeta, who also worked on the screenplay, Tasio is played by three actors at different ages. Tasio's realism demanded a three months shoot that involved the actors living and working in primitive conditions. Tasio won critical praise and placed Armendáriz as an emerging talented director to be considered.

Two year later, he made his second film 27 Hours (1986) which center in a group of youngsters in San Sebastián involved with by drug addiction and delinquency. It was part of a popular trend of Spanish films focused in youth problems that it was falling out of favor by the time this film was released. Nevertheless 27 Hours won the Silver Shell at the San Sebastián International Film Festival.

In 1990, Armendáriz returned to the ethnographic style of his first film with: Las Cartas de Alou (Letters from Alou), a narrative that follows a Senegalese black young man who arrives in Spain as an illegal immigrant and has to confront personal and institutional discrimination. Well received by film critics, Las Cartas de Alou won the Golden Shell as best film at the San Sebastian film festival and Armendáriz received a Goya Award and the Spanish guild award of film writers in the original screenplay category.

Armendáriz reached wide popular success with his third film Stories from the Kronen (1995), about alienated upper class young friends in Madrid, who regularly meet at the bar that gives the film its title. It was adapted from a novel by José Angel Mañas in an Elias Querejeta's production. The film, starring Juan Diego Botto and Jordi Mollà, follows two close friends filling their summer vacation with sex, drugs and rock. The film became emblematic of the Spanish young generation of the 1990s.

Armendáriz subsequent film became his best regarded artistic success Secretos del Corazon (Secrets of the Heart) (1997). An intimist drama that centers on Javi, a nine-year-old boy who while visiting relatives in rural Navarre during the early 1960s discovers the world of the adults. The film reflected the director's own nostalgic views of his childhood in the Navarrese countryside, portraying with sensibility the growing up of the child. Secretos del Corazon received a number of awards and was Spain's candidate to the Academy Awards in the foreign language film category that year.

In 1999 Armendáriz founded his own production company Oria films with Pui Oria. Two years later he directed his next film Silencio Roto (Broken Silence), a story about Maquis, the guerilla fighters that confronted the Francoist forces in the aftermath of the Spanish Civil War.

The director's subsequent project was a return to his origins as a documentarist, making Escenario Movil (2004) which follows the itinerant life of a musician through different musical venues.

A year later Armendáriz directed Obaba (2005), a fragmented tale based on the compilation of short stories book Obabakoak written by Bernardo Atxaga. Armendáriz most recent film No tengas miedo (Don't be afraid) (2011) stars Michelle Jenner as Silvia a young woman confronting her past as an abused child.

At Gijón International Film Festival in 2011, he received the Nacho Martinez Award.

== Filmography as director ==
| Year | English title | Original title | Notes |
|---|---|---|---|
| 1979 | Funny Dance | Barregarearen dantza | Documentary short |
| 1980 | Landscape | Ikusmena | Documentary short |
| 1981 | The Riberbanks of Navarre | Ikuska 11 | Documentary short |
| 1981 | The Charcoal workers of Navarre | Nafarrako Ikazkinack /Carboneros de Navarra | Documentary short |
| 1984 | Tasio | Tasio | Fotogramas de Plata Best Spanish Film |
| 1986 | 27 Hours | 27 Horas | Silver Shell at the San Sebastián International Film Festival. |
| 1990 | Letters from Alou | Las cartas de Alou | Golden Shell at the San Sebastián International Film Festival. |
| 1995 | Stories from the Kronen | Historias del Kronen | Adaptation of José Angel Mañas eponymous novel.: Goya Award Best Adapted Screenplay |
| 1997 | Secrets of the Heart | Secretos del Corazón | Nominee of the Academy Award for Best Foreign Language Film |
| 2001 | Broken Silence | Silencio Roto | |
| 2004 | Moving Stage | Escenario móvil | Documentary |
| 2005 | Obaba | Obaba | Based on Obabakoak written by Bernardo Atxaga. |
| 2011 | Don't Be Afraid | No tengas miedo | |
