= José Ángel Mañas =

Spanish writer (born 1971)

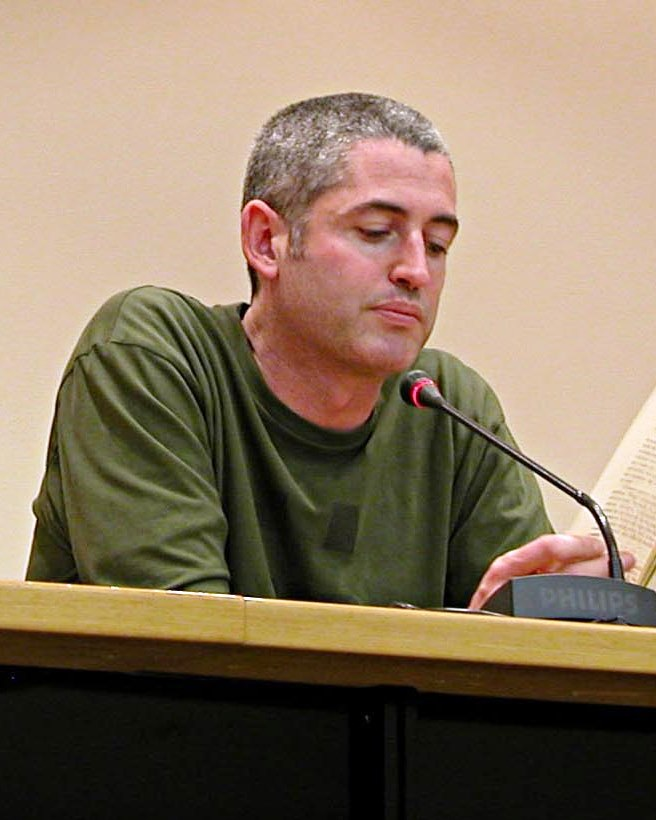
- Born: October 22, 1971 (age 54); Madrid

José Ángel Mañas (Madrid, 22 October 1971) is a Spanish writer. Mañas is often included as a member of the generation of neorealist Spanish writers from the 1990s, along with Juan Gracia, Gabriela Bustelo, Ray Loriga and Lucía Etxebarria. His books have been translated into several languages.

== Books ==
Mañas achieved popular acclaim upon the publication of his literary debut Historias del Kronen. The novel, a finalist for the Premio Nadal literary prize in 1994, became a cult classic, particularly after the film adaptation by Spanish director Montxo Armendáriz. Three novels similar in style and content followed Historias del Kronen: Mensaka (1995), Ciudad Rayada (1998) and Sonko95 (1995). Autorretrato con negro de fondo (1999), together with Historias del Kronen, form the "Kronen Tetralogy" that Mañas wrote about in the note at the end of Sonoko95, as follows:

I like to say that these four novels are punk novels or "nobelas". I was thinking at that time that "punk" —and when I used this concept I had in mind the music of the Ramones and the example of groups like the Velvet Underground— was the best way to describe what I was trying to do in writing. I thought that it was a good comparison that helped bring out the aesthetic qualities —speed, authenticity and rawness— that I aim for in a novel. Over time I continued exploring the possibilities of this brilliant comparison and expanding on the idea, which is turning out to be more serious and useful than I had expected. For me a "nobela" melds all of the heteroglossic elements that modern fiction either ignores or puts between quotation marks. All of this "noise" —and by "noise" I mean anything from bastardized spellings to colloquial mistakes and any kind of slang or language that is usually avoided in literature— is what a real novelist has to turn to if he wants to revitalize and pump new blood into a genre positioned like no other to give artistic shape to living language.

Of the novels in the "Kronen Tetralogy," Sonko95 stands out for the appearance of some of the most prominent characteristics that would come define to Mañas' later works. In this respect, Sonko95 has a lot more to do with Soy un escritor frustrado, 1996, than with Historias del Kronen and Mensaka.

In fact in Soy un escritor frustrado, themes which are absent from José Ángel Mañas' first two novels, become permanent fixtures in Sonko95, Mundo Burbuja (2001) and Caso Karen (2005), in particular, his meta-literary character. Soy un escritor frustrado in fact describes his own writing process and he enjoys along the way reflecting on the highs and lows of success, which Mañas himself has famously experienced first hand.

In Caso Karen, Mañas rails without mercy against the modern literary scene and its most relevant institutions: authors, agents, publishing houses, prizes and conferences. Like in old pastoral romances, many of the characters from Caso Karen are depictions of real people: in "Karen del Korral" Lucía Etxebarria's personality traits are observed; "Carina Martinell" is Carmen Balcells; "Armando Sala" is Antonio Gala, etc. Additionally Caso Karen is structurally Mañas most complex work.

In 2007 Manas published his first foray into historic fiction: El secreto del Oráculo (Ediciones Destino), based on Alexander the Great, was shortlisted for the 'Espartaco' prize for best historical novel.

In José Ángel Mañas' 2008 novel La pella, the writer has gone back to the style that made him famous, with his return to the world of realism.

His first entry outside of the fields of fiction and narrative is Un alma en incandescencia (2008), a book of aphorisms published by the Riojan publishing house Editorial Buscarini. The book was illustrated and inspired by the French artist Franciam Charlot.

In November 2010, he published Sospecha with Editorial Destino, in which the inspectors Pacheco and Duarte reappear, who were already present in Caso Karen.

In 2022, he won the 29th National ‘Cultura Viva’ Prize for Narrative for his entire body of work. In 2025, he won the Letras del Mediterráneo Award in the historical novel category.

=== Film Adaptations ===
Historias del Kronen was Mañas' first novel made into a movie and the screenplay earned him the respective Goya award. In Montxo Armendáriz's adaptation, some of the intellectual references from the novel are missing, such as, the endless appearances of Bret Easton Ellis's American Psycho in the conversations between Carlos and Roberto.

Salvador García Ruiz realized the film version of Mensaka, which came out in 1998. Mañas' novel Soy un escritor frustrado was made for the big screen with the title Imposture, directed by Patrick Bouchitey, and premiered in 2005, the same year that Caso Karen was published.

== Bibliography ==
- 1994 Historias del Kronen
- 1995 Mensaka
- 1996 Soy un escritor frustrado
- 1998 Ciudad Rayada
- 1999 Sonko95
- 2001 Mundo Burbuja
- 2005 Caso Karen
- 2007 A series of novellas El hombre de los 21 dedos, in collaboration with Antonio Dominguez Leiva
- 2007 El secreto del Oráculo
- 2008 La pella
- 2008 Un alma en incandescencia. Pensando en torno a Franciam Charlot (aforísmos sobre pintura)
- 2019 La última juerga
