= List of Spanish films of 1997 =

A list of Spanish-produced and co-produced feature films released in Spain in 1997.

== Films ==
Release		Title (Domestic title)	Cast & Crew	Ref.
J A N U A R Y	10	Love Can Seriously Damage Your Health (El amor perjudica seriamente la salud)	Director: Manuel Gómez Pereira Cast: Ana Belén, Juanjo Puigcorbé, Penélope Cruz, Gabino Diego	
J A N U A R Y	17	Actresses (Actrius)	Director: Ventura Pons Cast: Núria Espert, Rosa Maria Sardà, Anna Lizaran, Mercè Pons	
J A N U A R Y	17	Como un relámpago	Director: Miguel Hermoso Cast: Santiago Ramos, Assumpta Serna, Eloy Azorín	
J A N U A R Y	24	Familia	Director: Fernando León de Aranoa Cast: Juan Luis Galiardo, Amparo Muñoz, Ágata Lys, Elena Anaya, Chete Lera, Raquel Rodrigo, Juan Querol, André Falcon, Aníbal Carbonero	
J A N U A R Y	31	Excuse Me Darling, but Lucas Loved Me (Perdona bonita, pero Lucas me quería a mí)	Director: Dunia Ayaso, Félix Sabroso Cast: Jordi Mollà, Pepón Nieto, Roberto Correcher, Esperanza Roy	
F E B R U A R Y	21	The Disappearance of Garcia Lorca (Muerte en Granada)	Director: Marcos Zurinaga Cast: Esai Morales, Andy García, Jeroen Krabbé, Edward James Olmos, Marcela Walerstein, Naím Thomas, Miguel Ferrer, Simón Andreu	
F E B R U A R Y	28	¿De qué se ríen las mujeres?	Director: Joaquín Oristrell Cast: Verónica Forqué, Candela Peña, Adriana Ozores	
M A R C H	7	Comanche Territory (Territorio comanche)	Director: Gerardo Herrero Cast: Imanol Arias, Carmelo Gómez, Cecilia Dopazo	
M A R C H	14	Secrets of the Heart (Secretos del corazón)	Director: Montxo Armendáriz Cast: Carmelo Gómez, Charo López, Sílvia Munt	
M A R C H	21	A Wound of Light (La herida luminosa)	Director: José Luis Garci Cast: Fernando Guillén, Mercedes Sampietro, Julia Gutiérrez Caba, María Massip, Beatriz Santana, Neus Asensi, Cayetana Guillén	
A P R I L	4	Tramway to Malvarrosa (Tranvía a la Malvarrosa)	Director: José Luis García Sánchez Cast: Liberto Rabal, Juan Luis Galiardo, Antonio Resines, Vicente Parra, Fernando Fernán Gómez, Ariadna Gil	
A P R I L	4	Lycantropus: The Moonlight Murders (Licántropo: el asesino de la luna llena)	Director: Francisco Rodríguez Gordillo Cast: Paul Naschy, Amparo Muñoz	
M A Y	30	The Lucky Star (La buena estrella)	Director: Ricardo Franco Cast: Antonio Resines, Maribel Verdú, Jordi Mollá, Ramón Barea, Elvira Mínguez, Clara Sanchís	
J U N E	6	Eso	Director: Fernando Colomo Cast: Daniel Guzmán, Diana Gálvez, Antonio Molero, Saturnino García, Francisco Maestre, Javier Cámara, Blanca Portillo, Mónica Cano	
J U N E	20	Airbag	Director: Juanma Bajo Ulloa Cast: Karra Elejalde, Fernando Guillén Cuervo, Alberto San Juan, Maria de Medeiros, Francisco Rabal, Rosa María Sardà	
J U L Y	4	Time of Happiness (El tiempo de la felicidad)	Director: Manuel Iborra Cast: Verónica Forqué, Silvia Abascal, María Adánez, Carlos Fuentes, Pepón Nieto, Liberto Rabal, Fele Martínez, Antonio Resines	
A U G U S T	14	Atolladero	Director: Óscar Aibar Cast: Pere Ponce, Joaquín Hinojosa, Iggy Pop, Félix Rotaeta, Carlos Lucas, Ion Gabella, Oriol Tramvia, Ariadna Gil	
A U G U S T	29	Chevrolet	Director: Javier Maqua Cast: Javier Albalá, Manuel de Blas, Isabel Ordaz	
A U G U S T	29	There Is Always a Right Way (Siempre hay un camino a la derecha)	Director: José Luis García Sánchez Cast: Juan Luis Galiardo, Juan Echanove, Rosa Maria Sardà, Neus Asensi, Javier Gurruchaga, Adriana Davidova, Manuel Alexandre, Tina Sainz, Fernando Vivanco	
S E P T E M B E R	26	Martín (Hache)	Director: Adolfo Aristarain Cast: Juan Diego Botto, Federico Luppi, Cecilia Roth, Eusebio Poncela, Sancho Gracia, Ana María Picchio	
O C T O B E R	3	The Color of the Clouds (El color de las nubes)	Director: Mario Camus Cast: Julia Gutiérrez Caba, Antonio Valero, Ana Duato, José Mª Domenech, Simón Andreu, Ramón Langa, Manuel Zarzo, Fernando Valverde	
O C T O B E R	11	Live Flesh (Carne trémula)	Director: Pedro Almodóvar Cast: Javier Bardem, Liberto Rabal, Francesca Neri, Ángela Molina, José Sancho, Penélope Cruz	
O C T O B E R	11	Amor de hombre	Director: Yolanda García Serrano, Juan Luis Iborra Cast: Loles León, Andrea Occhipinti	
O C T O B E R	17	Pajarico	Director: Carlos Saura Cast: Francisco Rabal, Manuel Bandera, Alejandro Martínez, Juan Luis Galiardo, María Luisa San José, Dafne Fernández, Borja Elgea, Eusebio Lázaro	
O C T O B E R	17	Memorias del ángel caído	Director: David Alonso, Fernando Cámara Cast: Santiago Ramos, José Luis López Vázquez, Emilio Gutiérrez-Caba, Asunción Balaguer, Tristán Ulloa, Héctor Alterio, Juan Echanove	
O C T O B E R	24	The Chambermaid on the Titanic (La camarera del Titanic)	Director: Bigas Luna Cast: Olivier Martinez, Aitana Sánchez-Gijón, Romane Bohringer	
O C T O B E R	24	Geisha	Director: Eduardo Raspo Cast: Ana Álvarez, Manuel Bandera, Arturo Maly, Jorge Marrale, Germán Palacios	(Note: Co-production Spain–Argentina.)
O C T O B E R	31	Dance with the Devil (Perdita Durango)	Director: Álex de la Iglesia Cast: Rosie Perez, Javier Bardem, Harley Cross, Aimee Graham, Screamin' Jay Hawkins	
N O V E M B E R	7	Do It for Me (Hazlo por mí)	Director: Ángel Fernández Santos Cast: Cayetana Guillén Cuervo, Carlos Hipólito, Nancho Novo,	
N O V E M B E R	7	99.9	Director: Agustí Villaronga Cast: María Barranco, Terele Pávez	
N O V E M B E R	14	My Brother's Gun (La pistola de mi hermano)	Director: Ray Loriga Cast: Nico Bidasolo, Daniel Gónzález, Andrés Gertrúdix, Anna Galiena, Karra Elejalde, Viggo Mortensen, Christina Rosenvinge	
N O V E M B E R	28	Backroads (Carreteras secundarias)	Director: Emilio Martínez-Lázaro Cast: Antonio Resines, Fernando Ramallo, Maribel Verdú, Miriam Díaz Aroca, Jesús Bonilla, Montserrat Carulla, Mayte Blasco	
D E C E M B E R	19	Open Your Eyes (Abre los ojos)	Director: Alejandro Amenábar Cast: Penélope Cruz, Eduardo Noriega, Fele Martínez, Najwa Nimri, Chete Lera	

== Box office ==
The ten highest-grossing Spanish films in 1997, by domestic box office gross revenue, are as follows:

Highest-grossing films of 1997
Rank	Title	Distributor	Admissions	Domestic gross (€)
1	Airbag	Hispano Foxfilm	2,105,521	6,925,452
2	Live Flesh (Carne trémula)	Warner Española	1,346,577	4,750,808
3	Love Can Seriously Damage Your Health (El amor perjudica seriamente la salud)	Columbia TriStar	1,045,994	3,589,966
4	Secrets of the Heart (Secretos del corazón)	Alta Films	822,371	2,945,605
5	Dance with the Devil (Perdita Durango)	Sogepaq	684,539	2,324,460
6	The Dog in the Manger (El perro del hortelano) ‡	Columbia TriStar	634,980	2,035,364
7	Abre los ojos (Abre los ojos)	Sogepaq	481,010	1,811,881
8	Thesis (Tesis) ‡	United International Pictures	584,010	1,798,197
9	Lucky Star (La buena estrella)	Alta Films	452,099	1,603,936
10	Martín (Hache)	Alta Films	429,804	1,556,901
‡: 1996 theatrical opening

== See also ==
- 12th Goya Awards
