= 12th Goya Awards =

- Date: 31 January 1998
- Site: Palacio Municipal de Congresos de Madrid
- Hosted by: El Gran Wyoming

Highlights
- Best Film: Lucky Star
- Best Actor: Antonio Resines; Lucky Star
- Best Actress: Cecilia Roth; Martín (Hache)
- Most awards: Lucky Star (5)
- Most nominations: Secrets of the Heart (9)

Television coverage
- Network: TVE

The 12th Goya Awards were presented in Madrid, Spain on 31 January 1998. The gala was hosted by El Gran Wyoming.

Lucky Star won the award for Best Film.

== Winners and nominees ==
The nominees and winners are listed as follows:

=== Major award nominees ===
Best Film: Lucky Star; Martín (Hache); Secrets of the Heart	Best Director: Ricardo Franco – Lucky Star; Adolfo Aristarain – Martín (Hache); Montxo Armendáriz – Secrets of the Heart
Best Actor: Antonio Resines – Lucky Star; Javier Bardem – Live Flesh; Jordi Mollà – Lucky Star	Best Actress: Cecilia Roth – Martín (Hache); Julia Gutiérrez Caba – The Color of the Clouds; Maribel Verdú – Lucky Star
Best Supporting Actor: José Sancho – Live Flesh; Antonio Valero – The Color of the Clouds; Juan Jesús Valverde – The Rats	Best Supporting Actress: Charo López – Secrets of the Heart; Ángela Molina – Live Flesh; Vicky Peña – Secrets of the Heart
Best Original Screenplay: Lucky Star – Ricardo Franco and Ángeles González Sinde; Familia – Fernando León de Aranoa; Secrets of the Heart – Montxo Armendáriz	Best Adapted Screenplay: The Chambermaid on the Titanic – Cuca Canals and Bigas Luna; Actrius – Josep Maria Benet i Jornet and Ventura Pons; Backroads – Ignacio Martínez de Pisón
Best New Actor: Andoni Erburu – Secrets of the Heart; Manuel Manquiña – Airbag; Fernando Ramallo – Backroads	Best New Actress: Isabel Ordaz – Chevrolet; Paulina Gálvez – Retrato de mujer con hombre al fondo; Blanca Portillo – The Color of the Clouds
Best Spanish Language Foreign Film: Ashes of Paradise • Argentina; The Last Call • Mexico; Vertical Love • Cuba	Best European Film: The Full Monty • UK; Brassed Off • UK; The English Patient • UK
Best New Director: Fernando León de Aranoa – Familia; David Alonso and Fernando Cámara – Memorias del ángel caído; Mireia Ros – La Moños	Best Animated Film: Megasónicos

=== Other award nominees ===
Best Cinematography: The Color of the Clouds – Jaume Peracaula; The Chambermaid on the Titanic – Patrick Blossier; In Praise of Older Women – José Luis Alcaine	Best Editing: Airbag – Pablo Blanco; The Color of the Clouds – José María Biurrun; Secrets of the Heart – Rori Sáinz de Rozas
Best Art Direction: Secrets of the Heart – Félix Murcia; The Color of the Clouds – Antonio Cortés; In Praise of Older Women – Josep Rosell	Best Production Supervision: Perdita Durango – José Luis Escolar; The Chambermaid on the Titanic – Roberto Manni; Comanche Territory – Yousaf Bokhari
Best Sound: Secrets of the Heart – Gilles Ortion, Alfonso Pino and Bela María da Costa; Time of Happiness – Daniel Goldstein, Ricardo Steinberg and Eduardo Fernández; Martín (hache) – Daniel Goldstein, Ricardo Steinberg, Carlos Garrido and Ángel Gallardo	Best Special Effects: Airbag – Juan Ramón Molina; The Chambermaid on the Titanic – Roberto Ricci; Territorio comanche – Reyes Abades and Emilio Ruiz del Río
Best Costume Design: The Chambermaid on the Titanic – Franca Squarciapino; Perdita Durango – María Estela Fernández and Glenn Ralston; The Disappearance of Garcia Lorca – León Revuelta	Best Makeup and Hairstyles: Perdita Durango – José Quetglás and Mercedes Guillot; The Disappearance of Garcia Lorca – Miguel Sesé and Francisca Guillot; La herida luminosa – Cristóbal Criado and Alicia López Medina
Fictional Short Film: Cazadores; Campeones; En medio de ninguna parte; Hola, mamá; Pasaia	Best Original Score: Lucky Star – Eva Gancedo; Perdita Durango – Simon Boswell; Tic Tac – José Manuel Pagán

== Honorary Goya ==
- Rafael Azcona
