= Lucky Star (1997 film) =

1997 film by Ricardo Franco

- Theatrical release poster
- Spanish: La buena estrella
- Directed by: Ricardo Franco
- Written by: Ángeles González Sinde; Ricardo Franco; Alvaro del Amo
- Produced by: Pedro Costa; Enrique Cerezo
- Starring: Antonio Resines; Jordi Mollá; Maribel Verdú
- Cinematography: Tote Trenas
- Edited by: Esperanza Cobos
- Music by: Eva Gancedo
- Production companies: Pedro Costa PC; Enrique Cerezo PC; MAT Films; GA & A
- Release dates: 15 May 1997 (Cannes); 30 May 1997 (Spain)
- Running time: 98 minutes
- Countries: Spain; France; Italy
- Language: Spanish
- Budget: 175,000,000 ₧

Lucky Star (Spanish: La buena estrella) is a 1997 drama film directed by Ricardo Franco and starring Antonio Resines, Jordi Mollá and Maribel Verdú. Critically acclaimed, the film won five Goya Awards: Best Film, Best Director, Best Actor (Antonio Resines), Best Original Screenplay and Best Original Score. Ricardo Franco made just one more film; he died of a heart attack in 1998.

== Plot ==
Rafael is a kind, good-hearted butcher. He has a lonely life after accidentally castrating himself while cutting meat several years before, but he longs to have a family life, a dream that seems unattainable for him. One early morning when he is driving his truck to his butcher’s shop, he sees a young man assaulting a woman. Rafael cannot help but intervene and jumps out of his vehicle to help her. Taking pity on the girl, he takes her to his home. Her name is Marina and the man who was beating her was her boyfriend, Daniel. Marina, nicknamed One-Eye (for she lost one eye in a childhood accident), tells Rafael how she and Daniel grew up together in a hostile environment in an orphanage, where she was left abandoned by her father. Marina feels attach to Daniel, as they do not have anybody else. They have had a hard life on the streets, and now that she is pregnant by him, she is adamant not only to have the baby, that Daniel does not want, but she would like to offer the baby the family life, she never had.

After knowing that Daniel is now in jail, Rafael proposes to Marina to take care of her and the baby. She gladly accepts his offer but warns him that Daniel sooner or later will come back and then she would not know what to do. Marina and Rafael both grab the possibility to fulfill the impossible dream they once had to form a family.

Rafael treats the troubled Marina with kindness and she responds by proving that there is more than one way to be a man and to experience love. In this way, the two find healing and happiness raising Marina's daughter, Estrella, that Rafael recognizes as his own.

Years later, their happiness is threatened by the sudden return of Daniel, fresh out of prison. He knocks on the door one night, beaten and bleeding, just as Marina arrived years ago. He only wants a place to live. Though he knows that Marina has strong, unresolved feelings for Daniel, Rafael does not want to lose her and reluctantly allows Daniel to stay for a few days that become weeks. With only lifetimes of strife in common, the three lonely, disaffected adults thus form an uneasy family.

Marina is reluctant to be left alone with Daniel, it is not him who she does not trust but her own feelings. To see her reaction, Rafael goes to his sister's house in the countryside, leaving the other two alone. Rafael comes back soon unexpectedly finding Marina and Daniel together in bed. He initially wants them to leave but finally comes to accept an uncommon arrangement and the three of them remain together with their daughter forming an uneasy family. Daniel, who passes as Marina’s brother, helps Rafael in the Butcher’s shop and settles into a family life for a while. He finally leaves as Marina has said that he would do eventually.

Nevertheless, not much later he is in trouble and Marina leaves to follow him. Rafael is now alone to take care of Estrella, the daughter.

Time has gone by and watching the T.V. news Rafael finds out that Daniel has been involved in a robbery with a band of criminals and is once again in jail. Then Marina is brought back to him. She is pregnant again and they have a second daughter.

Rafael visits Daniel in jail; between them has finally grown appreciation and understanding. Daniel feels defeated, the lucky star that he thought he had has left him. He was raped in prison and is now seriously ill.

Daniel's condition is so bad that he is released from jail to spend his remaining days at home. He is grateful that now he has a place to go: the home with Rafael, Marina and their two daughters. Daniel's suffering is unbearable and he begs Marina to help him die. Unwillingly she shoots him to release him from his misery. Marina dies before being charged with the killing. Rafael is now alone to take care of the daughters.

== Cast ==
- Antonio Resines, as Rafael, a gentle butcher.
- Maribel Verdú as Marina.
- Jordi Mollá as Daniel, a handsome petty criminal .
- Elvira Mínguez as Ana Mari
- Ramón Barea as Paco
- Clara Sanchis as Elena

== Production ==
A Spanish-French-Italian co-production, the film was produced by Pedro Costa PC, Enrique Cerezo PC, MAT Films and GA & A with participation of TVE.

== Themes ==
Lucky Star is a dramatic intimist film about love, abandonment, solitude and ultimate connection. It was based on a real-life story taken from an actual crime and developed by the producer Pedro Costa.

== Release ==
The film screened at the 50th Cannes Film Festival in May 1997. It was theatrically released in Spain on 30 May 1997.

== Reception ==
The film was well received by critics and audiences. It won Goyas for best film, best actor, best director and best original score, and was nominated for 4 others, including Jordi Mollà for best actor and Maribel Verdú for best actress. It won over Secretos del corazón, a film that was ultimately Spain's candidate to the Oscar where it was among that year's nominees. Ricardo Franco, the director, left his next film unfinished, dying of a heart attack only one year after the release of Lucky Star, his best regarded work.

Although Antonio Resines won the best actor award, many found Jordi Mollá's performance in the film more compelling. Some critics found the story too grim, the euthanasia issue controversial, and the erotic scenes out of place in a film characterized by its sobriety.

== Awards ==
- Fotogramas de Plata, Best Film, 1997
- Cannes Film Festival, Prize of the Ecumenical Jury - Special Mention, 1997
- Ondas Awards, Best Director, Best Actor tied (Jordi Mollá and Antonio Resines), 1997
- Mar del Plata International Film Festival, Best director, Best Actor tied (Antonio Resines, Jordi Mollá), 1997
- Five 12th Goya Awards: Best Film and Best Director, Best Actor, Best Original Screenplay, Best Original Music, 1998
- San Diego International Film Festival, Best Film, 1998

== DVD release ==
Lucky Star is available in Region 2 DVD. Audio in Spanish and dubbed Italian. English and French subtitles. There is no Region 1 DVD available.

== See also ==
- List of Spanish films of 1997

== Bibliography ==
- Caparrós Lera, José María: El cine de nuestros días 1994-1998, Ediciones Rialp, 1999. ISBN 84-321-3233-0
