= Live Flesh (film) =

1997 film by Pedro Almodóvar

- Theatrical release poster
- Spanish: Carne trémula
- Directed by: Pedro Almodóvar
- Screenplay by: Pedro Almodóvar; Ray Loriga (Note: Collaboration); Jorge Guerricaechevarría
- Based on: Live Flesh by Ruth Rendell
- Produced by: Agustín Almodóvar
- Starring: Javier Bardem; Francesca Neri; Liberto Rabal; Ángela Molina; José Sancho; Penélope Cruz; Pilar Bardem
- Cinematography: Affonso Beato
- Edited by: José Salcedo
- Music by: Alberto Iglesias
- Production companies: El Deseo S.A.; Ciby 2000; France 3
- Distributed by: Warner Española S.A. (Spain); Ciby 2000 (France)
- Release dates: 10 October 1997 (Spain); 29 October 1997 (France)
- Running time: 103 minutes
- Countries: Spain; France
- Languages: Spanish; Italian
- Box office: $1.8 million (United States); 790 million ₧ (Spain)

Live Flesh (Spanish: Carne trémula) is a 1997 erotic crime drama film written and directed by Pedro Almodóvar, based on the 1986 novel of the same name by English author Ruth Rendell. The film stars Javier Bardem, Francesca Neri, Liberto Rabal, Ángela Molina and José Sancho, with Penélope Cruz and Pilar Bardem.

== Plot ==
Madrid, Christmas 1970. The Spanish State has declared a state of emergency curtailing civil liberties. A young prostitute, Isabel Plaza Caballero, gives birth on a bus to a son, Víctor. Twenty years later, Víctor shows up uninvited at the apartment of Elena, a drug addict with whom he had sex a week earlier, expecting another date with her. Elena angrily orders him to leave, eventually threatening him with a gun. Enraged, Víctor wrestles the gun from her; in the process, Elena gets knocked out and the gun goes off.

After a neighbour calls the police, two officers, Sancho and David, arrive on the scene. Sancho is an unstable alcoholic who suspects his wife Clara of infidelity, while David is sensible and righteous. When the officers enter the apartment, Víctor holds Elena hostage at gunpoint. David tries to appease him and get him to drop his gun, but Sancho repeatedly threatens Víctor. Finally, David gets Sancho and then Víctor to put down their guns. David instructs Elena to flee. Sancho then lunges for Víctor, and as they wrestle for the gun, David is shot.

Two years later, Víctor, in jail, learns through a televised wheelchair basketball match that David, now partially paralysed from the gunshot, has become a star player at the Summer Paralympics and is married to Elena. Víctor is released four years later, vowing revenge on Elena and David. His mother has died, leaving him some money and a house in an area scheduled for demolition. Víctor visits his mother's grave, where he spots Elena at her father's burial service. Without identifying himself, he briefly offers her his condolences. He then meets Sancho's wife Clara, who has arrived late for Elena's service. They leave together and she visits his apartment. They establish a tentative relationship.

Elena, now clean from drugs and operating an orphanage, tells David of her encounter with Víctor. David stops by Víctor's house and demands that he stay away from Elena. As he leaves, David sees Clara arriving and watches from a distance. Clara agrees to teach Víctor how to make love and eventually falls in love with him. Víctor is later accepted as a volunteer by the orphanage, as he earned a teaching diploma by correspondence during his time in jail, much to Elena's chagrin.

David continues to trail Víctor and discovers that he works at Elena's orphanage. He confronts Víctor again, but Víctor insists that Sancho forced his finger on the trigger because Sancho knew David was having an affair with Clara. David tells Elena what Víctor said and admits to the affair. Elena is disgusted but still plans to leave the orphanage to evade Víctor. Víctor tells Elena that his original revenge plan was to become the world's greatest lover, have sex with Elena all night long, and then abandon her.

Víctor breaks up with Clara, devastating her. While he is working overnight at the orphanage, Elena arrives to retrieve her belongings and offers him a night of passion on condition he never contacts her again, to which he agrees. Elena reveals her infidelity to David, but says she will remain his wife because he needs her more than Víctor does. David is nevertheless adamant about exacting revenge on Víctor.

Tired of Sancho's constant abuse, Clara announces she will leave him. He confronts her and she shoots him. David arrives and helps Sancho clean his wound before showing him photographs he has been taking of Víctor and Clara. Sancho and David drive to Víctor's house, arriving just as Clara has finished writing Víctor a farewell letter. Sancho and Clara hold each other at gunpoint and fire. Clara falls dead before a wounded Sancho kills himself.

In a voiceover, David reads a letter written to Elena from Miami, where he is spending Christmas with friends, apologising for how everything turned out. At the orphanage, a pregnant Elena goes into labor and on the way to the hospital, she and Víctor get stuck in heavy traffic. Víctor is reminded of the circumstances of his own birth and tells his unborn child that the Spanish people no longer live in fear as they did at the time of his birth.

== Cast ==
- Javier Bardem as David
- Francesca Neri as Elena
- Liberto Rabal as Víctor Plaza
- Ángela Molina as Clara
- José Sancho as Sancho
- Penélope Cruz as Isabel Plaza Caballero
- Pilar Bardem as Doña Centro
- Álex Angulo as bus driver
- Mariola Fuentes as Clementina
- Yael Be as young woman
- Josep Molins as Josep
- Daniel Lanchas as conductor
- Maria Rosenfeldt as girl

== Reception ==
Produced by El Deseo, Ciby 2000, and France 3 Cinéma, Almodóvar's twelfth film opened in Spain on 10 October 1997 on 125 screens. It grossed $800,000 in its opening weekend, becoming the first Spanish film of the year to top the Spanish box office. By its third weekend, it had grossed a record $2.9 million from 700,000 admissions. It went on to be the second highest-grossing Spanish film of the year behind Airbag with a gross of 790 million Spanish pesetas. It had its US premiere on 12 October 1997 at the New York Film Festival. It grossed $1.8 million in the United States and Canada.

Live Flesh enjoyed mostly positive reviews in Spain, even by critics who had previously dismissed Almodóvar's work criticizing the plot structure of his films.

José Arroyo in Sight and Sound praised the film's "emotional pitch: raw, fearful, passionate", its brilliant cinematic qualities and the high standard of acting by the five leads. In Neon magazine, Martin Aston concluded that "sexy movies are rarely this thrilling, thrillers never this sexy—and the two seldom combine so movingly".

On the review aggregator website Rotten Tomatoes, the film holds an approval rating of 80% based on reviews from 46 critics, with an average rating of 7.1/10. The website reads, "Live Flesh surveys the fallout from an act of violence with a mature melodrama that sees Pedro Almodóvar working in surprisingly restrained form." Metacritic, which uses a weighted average, assigned the film a score of 69 out of 100, based on 18 critics, indicating "generally favorable reviews".

== Accolades ==
Year	Award	Category	Nominee(s)	Result	Ref.
1998	12th Goya Awards	Best Actor	Javier Bardem	Nominated	
1998	12th Goya Awards	Best Supporting Actress	Ángela Molina	Nominated	
1998	12th Goya Awards	Best Supporting Actor	José Sancho	Won	
1998	11th European Film Awards	Best Film		Nominated	
1998	11th European Film Awards	Best European Actor	Javier Bardem	Nominated	
1999	52nd British Academy Film Awards	Best Film Not in the English Language		Nominated	

== See also ==
- List of Spanish films of 1997
- Bas Ek Pal, a Bollywood adaptation of Live Flesh
