= Backroads (1997 film) =

- Theatrical release poster
- Spanish: Carreteras secundarias
- Directed by: Emilio Martínez-Lázaro
- Screenplay by: Ignacio Martínez de Pisón
- Based on: Carreteras secundarias by Ignacio Martínez de Pisón
- Produced by: Ana Huete
- Starring: Antonio Resines; Fernando Ramallo; Maribel Verdú; Miriam Díaz Aroca
- Cinematography: Javier Salmones
- Edited by: Iván Aledo
- Music by: Roque Baños
- Production companies: Olmo Films; Sogecine; Kaplan; Fernando Trueba PC
- Distributed by: United International Pictures
- Release dates: 1997 (Seminci); 28 November 1997 (Spain)
- Country: Spain
- Language: Spanish

Backroads (Spanish: Carreteras secundarias) is a 1997 road movie directed by Emilio Martínez-Lázaro and written by Ignacio Martínez de Pisón, adapting the latter's novel Carreteras secundarias. It stars Antonio Resines, Fernando Ramallo, Maribel Verdú and Miriam Díaz Aroca.

== Plot ==
Set in 1974, during the last rales of the Francoist dictatorship, the plot follows the journey of salesman Lozano and his son Felipe driving a Citroën DS along the Spanish coast.

== Cast ==
- Antonio Resines as Lozano
- Fernando Ramallo as Felipe
- Maribel Verdú as Paquita
- Miriam Díaz Aroca as Estrella
- Tania Adam as Miranda
- Eloi Yebra
- Jesús Bonilla
- Alicia Hermida
- Ramón Langa
- Maite Blasco

== Production ==
Penned by Ignacio Martínez de Pisón, the screenplay is an adaptation of Martínez de Pisón's 1996 novel Carreteras secundarias. The films is a Olmo Films, Sogecine, Kaplan and Fernando Trueba PC production, with the participation of Sogepaq and Canal+.

== Release ==
The film screened out of competition at the 42nd Valladolid International Film Festival (Seminci) in 1997. Distributed by United International Pictures, the film was theatrically released in Spain on 28 November 1997.

== Accolades ==
Year	Award	Category	Nominee(s)	Result	Ref.
1998	12th Goya Awards	Best Adapted Screenplay	Ignacio Martínez de Pisón	Nominated	
1998	12th Goya Awards	Best New Actor	Fernando Ramallo	Nominated	

== See also ==
- List of Spanish films of 1997
