= Time of Happiness =

- Theatrical release poster
- Spanish: El tiempo de la felicidad
- Directed by: Manuel Iborra
- Screenplay by: Manuel Iborra
- Produced by: José Luis Olaizola M.; Rafael Díaz-Salgado
- Starring: Verónica Forqué; Silvia Abascal; María Adánez; Carlos Fuentes; Pepón Nieto; Liberto Rabal; Fele Martínez; Antonio Resines; Clara Sanchis; Francisco Algora
- Cinematography: Hans Burmann
- Edited by: Iván Aledo
- Production companies: Sogecine; Central de Producciones Audiovisuales
- Distributed by: Sogepaq
- Release date: 7 April 1997
- Country: Spain
- Language: Spanish

Time of Happiness (Spanish: El tiempo de la felicidad) is a 1997 Spanish film directed and written by Manuel Iborra. Its cast features Verónica Forqué, Silvia Abascal, María Adánez, Carlos Fuentes, Pepón Nieto, Liberto Rabal, Fele Martínez, and Antonio Resines, among others.

== Plot ==
The fiction is set in Ibiza in the Summer of 1970, with the backdrop of the hippy counterculture and the topic of free love. It tracks a "dysfunctional" nuclear family (consisting of Julia and Fernando as well as their four children Cucho, Elena, Verónica and Juan) and their romantic and sexual endeavours in the island.

== Cast ==
- Verónica Forqué as Julia
- Antonio Resines as Fernando
- Pepón Nieto as Cucho
- Clara Sanchis as Susi
- Fele Martínez as Ezequiel
- Liberto Rabal as León
- María Adánez as Elena
- Silvia Abascal as Verónica
- Carlos Fuentes as Juan
- Francisco Algora

== Production ==
The film is a Sogecine and Central de Producciones Audiovisuales production. While set in Ibiza, the film was primarily shot in the neighbouring island of Mallorca.

== Release ==
Distributed by Sogepaq, the film was theatrically released in Spain on 4 July 1997.

== Reception ==
Jonathan Holland of Variety considered that Iborra delivers a "mature but slightly flat nostalgia vehicle" that despite being "well crafted and intermittently affecting" and with some "terrific" performances, it is unlikely to induce "anything but mild astonishment" among offshore audiences.

Casimiro Torreiro of El País considered that, excessive subordination of the film to Forqué as well as other issues notwithstanding, the film breathes at ease when its young actresses (particularly Abascal) take over.

== Accolades ==
Year	Award	Category	Nominee(s)	Result	Ref.
1998	12th Goya Awards	Best Sound	Daniel Goldstein, Eduardo Fernández, Ricardo Steinberg	Nominated	

== See also ==
- List of Spanish films of 1997
