= Memorias del ángel caído =

- Theatrical release poster
- Directed by: David Alonso; Fernando Cámara
- Screenplay by: David Alonso; Fernando Cámara
- Produced by: Luis Méndez
- Starring: Santiago Ramos; José Luis López Vázquez; Emilio Gutiérrez-Caba; Asunción Balaguer; Tristán Ulloa; Héctor Alterio; Juan Echanove
- Cinematography: Fernando Arribas
- Edited by: Carmen Frías
- Music by: Javier Cámara
- Production company: Lotus Films
- Distributed by: United International Pictures
- Release dates: October 1997 (Sitges); 17 October 1997 (Spain)
- Country: Spain
- Language: Spanish

Memorias del ángel caído (transl. 'Memories of the Fallen Angel') is a 1997 Spanish thriller film with horror and fantasy elements written and directed by Fernando Cámara and David Alonso. It stars Santiago Ramos as a clergyman suffering a crisis of faith, alongside José Luis López Vázquez, Emilio Gutiérrez-Caba, Asunción Balaguer, Tristán Ulloa, Héctor Alterio, and Juan Echanove.

== Plot ==
In a parish church located in a neighborhood of Madrid, the faithful attending to the Holy Communion die on the spot. Upon the initial police inquiries pertaining the criminal investigation, the priests living in the parish react differently: Vicente speaks of a miracle, Julio is more reticent, while Francisco experiences a crisis of faith and a depressive state that plunges him into a series of terrifying visions. The deceased acolytes "resurrect" three days later and the police reveals that they had been poisoned by a drug. A violent death ends up bringing to light an ancient millenarian prophecy intending to create a new Christianity and whose dangerous leader is closer than it seemed.

== Cast ==
- Santiago Ramos as Francisco
- José Luis López Vázquez as Antonio
- Emilio Gutiérrez Caba as Vicente
- Asunción Balaguer as Juana
- Tristán Ulloa as Alberto
- Luis Perezagua as Jorge
- Héctor Alterio as Julio
- Juan Echanove as Carlos

== Production ==
The screenplay was penned by David Alonso and Fernando Cámara. Fernando Arribas worked as a cinematographer whereas Javier Cámara was responsible for the score. The film is a Lotus Film Internacional production. Shooting locations included the Sanctuary of Nuestra Señora de Valverde in Madrid.

== Release ==
Selected for the 30th Sitges Film Festival's competitive slate, the film was presented in October 1997. It was theatrically released in Spain on 17 October 1997.

== Accolades ==
| Year | Award | Category | Nominee(s) | Result | Ref. |
|---|---|---|---|---|---|
| 1998 | 12th Goya Awards | Best New Director | David Alonso, Fernando Cámara | Nominated | |

== See also ==
- List of Spanish films of 1997

== Bibliography ==
- González Laiz, Gonzalo (2013). "Lo fantástico en el último cine español: adopción, reinvención y fusión del género a través de Memorias del ángel caído, Fuera del cuerpo y La hora fría". Brumal: Revista de investigación sobre lo Fantástico. 1 (2). Bellaterra: Servei de Publicacions de la Universitat Autònoma de Barcelona. doi:10.5565/rev/brumal.70. ISSN 2014-7910. Archived from the original on 14 August 2022.
