= The Color of the Clouds =

- Theatrical release poster
- Spanish: El color de las nubes
- Directed by: Mario Camus
- Screenplay by: Mario Camus; Miguel Rubio
- Based on: a story by Mario Camus
- Starring: Julia Gutiérrez Caba; Ana Duato; Antonio Valero; José Mª Domenech; Simón Andreu; Pedro Barrejón; Adis Suljic; Ramón Langa; Manolo Zarzo; Fernando Valverde
- Cinematography: Jaume Peracaula
- Edited by: José M. Biurrun
- Music by: Sebastián Mariné
- Production companies: Urbana Films; Sogepaq
- Distributed by: Lauren Films
- Release dates: September 1997 (Zinemaldia); 3 October 1997 (Spain)
- Country: Spain
- Language: Spanish

The Color of the Clouds (Spanish: El color de las nubes) is a 1997 Spanish drama film directed by Mario Camus which stars Julia Gutiérrez Caba, Ana Duato, Antonio Valero, and José María Doménech.

== Plot ==
The plot revolves around a house in a Cantabrian village owned by Doña Lola, from which a series of intertwined subplots spawn. Lola and her niece Clementina agree on hosting a Bosnian refugee child (sabotaged by impostor kid Bartolomé), an old fisherman and Lola's friend (Colo) finds a drug cache nearby, the former house owner's son tries to evict Lola, and Clementina develops a romance with a lawyer (Valerio).

== Cast ==
- Julia Gutiérrez Caba as Lola
- Ana Duato as Clementina
- Antonio Valero as Valerio
- José María Domenéch as Colo
- Simón Andreu as Quiroga
- Pedro Barrejón as Bartolomé
- Adis Suljic as Mirsad
- Ramón Langa as Mateo
- Manuel Zarzo as Pedro
- Fernando Valverde as José María
- Blanca Portillo

== Production ==
The film was produced by Urbana Films alongside Sogepaq. It was shot in Cantabria.

== Release ==
Selected in the 45th San Sebastián International Film Festival's official selection, the film premiered in September 1997. Distributed by Lauren Films, it was theatrically released in Spain on 3 October 1997.

== Reception ==
Jonathan Holland of Variety deemed the film to be Camus' best for some years, "a complex but uncomplicated, lyrical but hard-edged adventure-cum-mood piece, with the kind of luminous maturity and compassion to seduce offshore arthouse auds".

Ángel Fernández-Santos of El País considered that Camus manages to "firmly hold on a fairly complex but fragile storyline", with the result of a "noble and solid Spanish film".

== Accolades ==
Year	Award	Category	Nominee(s)	Result	Ref.
1998	12th Goya Awards	Best Actress	Julia Gutiérrez Caba	Nominated	
1998	12th Goya Awards	Best Supporting Actor	Antonio Valero	Nominated	
1998	12th Goya Awards	Best New Actress	Blanca Portillo	Nominated	
1998	12th Goya Awards	Best Cinematography	Jaume Peracaula	Won	
1998	12th Goya Awards	Best Editing	José María Biurrun	Nominated	
1998	12th Goya Awards	Best Art Direction	Antonio Cortés	Nominated	

== See also ==
- List of Spanish films of 1997
