= Taxi (1996 film) =

- Theatrical release poster
- Directed by: Carlos Saura
- Screenplay by: Santiago Tabernero
- Produced by: Concha Díaz; Javier Castro
- Starring: Ingrid Rubio; Carlos Fuentes; Ágata Lys; Ángel de Andrés López; Eusebio Lázaro; Francisco Maestre; Maite Blasco
- Cinematography: Vittorio Storaro
- Edited by: Julia Juániz
- Music by: Mano Negra; Gipsy Kings
- Production company: PC Filmart
- Release date: 10 October 1996
- Running time: 110 minutes
- Country: Spain
- Language: Spanish

Taxi is a 1996 Spanish film directed by Carlos Saura, starring Ingrid Rubio. Set in Spain, its plot tracks a group of young neo-Nazi thugs controlled by an extreme right wing taxi driver who attack immigrants and homosexuals.

== Plot ==
After failing one of her midterm exams in a Madrid high school, Paz Velasco decides to drop out of the academic circuit. She takes this prompt decision much to the chagrin of her father, an overbearing taxi driver. In exchange, he forces her to join him at work so she can learn the trade and earn a living.

Her reconnection with the so-called "Family", the close-knit group of her father's co-workers, is initially uneventful. One of its members is Dani, Paz's childhood sweetheart and a young taxi apprentice about to be discharged from the military service. Upon meeting for the first time in many years, they rekindle their mutual attraction and start dating, much to the apparent satisfaction of Dani's mother Reme—a fellow cabbie who is having a secret affair with Paz's father. Reme's husband is a former taxi driver who, according to the explanations given to Paz, was shot by two drug dealers during a robbery. One of the shots left him paralyzed and the "Family"'s visits to him in the hospital are a staple in their common social life. Aside from Dani, Velasco and Reme, this group is completed by a shady individual named Calero and a thuggish brute nicknamed "Niño" who seems to act as an informal henchman of sorts for the former. Paz realizes Calero is a former cop even before being told so, and their mutual distrust is vivid and ever-increasing throughout the film.

From the outset, it is made clear to the audience that the "Family" is in fact a neo-fascist death squad whose members use their cabs to abduct non-white, immigrant, LGTB and drug-addicted customers with murderous intent. There is also some evidence of rudimentary tactics, e.g. using code words for each "kind" of victim in order to lure unwitting victims to the killing box. Dani has been recently groomed into the group and partakes in their activities, although it is made apparent to the audience that he does so reluctantly. The "Family" seems to be generally successful in its exploits: two murders are shown on-screen, as well as a raid on a Moroccan camp during which Dani accidentally kills a man. The film does show, however, one botched attack during which the victim manages to run away unharmed. It is left unclear whether or not the group is restricted to the core members shown onscreen. It is also left unclear whether the group's activities were prompted by the attack that crippled Dani's father or it was just a casual event that fuelled them further, or whether the version given to Paz was a lie and the attack was a direct result of the group's illegal pursuits. Their activities are spontaneous and seemingly not officially sanctioned, but there are ominous references by Calero to people "up there" who know and approve of the group's activities, leaving the door open to speculation on a wider conspiracy.

Although initially ignorant of the actions and general demeanour of the "Family", Paz gradually finds out the truth through a series of details and coincidences, such as a profusion of fascist and pre-democratic antics and regalia, purportedly intimate family reunions attracting skinheads and other sinister individuals and ending in massive Roman salutes, casual bigoted remarks from her father and Dani (as well as the latter's violent outburst on a black street vendor) and a disturbing pattern of codenames or "labels" directed at different collectivities. Paz's unassuming and long-suffering mother seems increasingly distraught at the prospect of having Dani close to her daughter, and although Paz initially blames this on his general lack of education and ambition, it becomes increasingly clear that her mother knows more than she says about him and the whole group.

Once confronted with the evidence, her disgust and adamant disapproval set up a chain of events leading to the climax. The paranoid and increasingly unstable Calero, who saw her as a potential liability to the group from the very beginning, now wishes to silence Paz at all costs. He shoots (and presumably kills) her father when he tries to stop him, and confronts her and Dani in the Retiro Park, shooting Dani, and being shot to death by Paz seconds before he is about to finish him off. The camera pans over the park as she walks away with the injured Dani, and credits roll. The fate of the rest of the group is left undisclosed.

== Cast ==
- Ingrid Rubio as Paz
- Carlos Fuentes as Dani
- Ágata Lys as Reme
- Ángel de Andrés López as Velasco
- Eusebio Lázaro as Calero
- Francisco Maestre as "Niño"
- Pilar Ordóñez as the transvestite
- Maite Blasco as Mari

== Release ==
The film was released theatrically in Spain on 10 October 1996.

== Awards ==
=== Nominations ===
- 1996: Camerimage Golden Frog Award: Vittorio Storaro
- 1996: San Sebastian Film Festival Golden Shell: Carlos Saura
- 1997: Spanish Actors Union Award (for a supporting role): Pilar Ordóñez

=== Wins ===
- 1996: San Sebastian Film Festival Special Mention: Ingrid Rubio
- 1997: Spanish Actors Union Newcomer Award: Ingrid Rubio
