= Open Your Eyes (1997 film) =

Spanish film by Alejandro Amenábar

- Spanish release poster
- Directed by: Alejandro Amenábar
- Written by: Alejandro Amenábar; Mateo Gil
- Produced by: Fernando Bovaira; José Luis Cuerda
- Starring: Eduardo Noriega; Penélope Cruz; Chete Lera; Fele Martínez; Najwa Nimri
- Cinematography: Hans Burmann
- Edited by: María Elena Sáinz de Rozas
- Music by: Alejandro Amenábar; Mariano Marín
- Production companies: Las Producciones del Escorpión; Sogetel; Les Films Alain Sarde; Lucky Red
- Distributed by: Sogepaq (Spain); AFMD (France)
- Release date: 19 December 1997 (Spain)
- Running time: 117 minutes
- Countries: Spain; France; Italy
- Language: Spanish
- Budget: 370 million ₧
- Box office: $9 million

Open Your Eyes (Spanish: Abre los ojos) is a 1997 science fiction psychological thriller film directed by Alejandro Amenábar, who co-wrote the screenplay with Mateo Gil. It stars Eduardo Noriega as a young man who begins to question reality following a car accident that disfigures his face along with Penélope Cruz, Chete Lera, Fele Martínez, and Najwa Nimri. It is a Spanish-French-Italian co-production.

Released on 19 December 1997 in Spain, the film was a financial success, grossing $9 million worldwide against a budget of $2.9 million. It received critical acclaim, with its intersecting planes of dream and reality prompting comparisons to Calderón de la Barca's 1635 play Life Is a Dream. An American remake, Vanilla Sky, was released in 2001, with Cruz reprising her role of Sofía.

== Plot ==
A young man awakens to a woman's voice telling him to open his eyes. He drives into a deserted city center before reawakening.

Accused of murder, the man, César, recounts his story to forensic psychologist Antonio while imprisoned and wearing a prosthetic mask. Through flashbacks, César is revealed to have lived a wealthy playboy lifestyle in Madrid, supported by an inheritance from his late parents. At his birthday party, he meets Sofía, a guest of his best friend Pelayo, and spends the night at her apartment, where they fall in love.

The following morning, César's obsessive former lover Nuria offers him a ride home. She confronts him about his indifference before deliberately driving the car off a hill, killing herself and leaving César with severe facial disfigurement beyond cosmetic repair. Despondent, César begins wearing the mask. At a club, he encounters a distant Sofía accompanied by Pelayo. Distraught at the thought of them together, César becomes intoxicated and passes out on the street.

César awakens to find Sofía beside him. The two resume their relationship, and surgeons miraculously develop a procedure that restores his face. However, César begins experiencing disturbing changes in his perception of reality. He sees Sofía transform into Nuria, though after restraining her, police insist that the woman he attacked was Sofía. At a bar, a mysterious man tells César that he is dreaming, demonstrating this by making everyone fall silent at his command. Seeking answers, César breaks into Sofía's apartment and discovers that Nuria has replaced her in photographs. Sofía appears and forgives him, but transforms into Nuria again. Terrified, César smothers her to death.

Through hypnosis, César recovers suppressed memories and recurring visions of the letters "L.E." He discovers that they refer to Life Extension, a cryonics company he previously saw advertised on television. César and Antonio visit its headquarters under police supervision, where they learn that the company combines cryogenic preservation with "artificial perception", allowing clients to continue living in a simulated dream while awaiting revival. Realizing that he is a client, César flees the building and demands to be awakened. Outside, he seizes a police officer's gun and shoots another officer, prompting police to open fire as Antonio attempts to shield him.

César and Antonio awaken unharmed in the deserted plaza and ascend to the building's rooftop, where they meet Duvernois, the man César previously encountered at the bar. Duvernois reveals that the year is 2145 and that César's simulated experiences diverged from reality after he passed out in the street. In reality, César awoke alone, fell into a deep depression, signed a contract with Life Extension, and committed suicide by drug overdose. His body was preserved, while his mind was revived in a simulation beginning with his last happy memory. However, recollections of his disfigurement caused a software malfunction that turned the dream into a nightmare.

Duvernois offers César a choice: return to a corrected simulation of his life in 1997 or awaken in 2145, when medical advances can restore his real face. To choose the latter, he must leap from the roof. Antonio frantically urges César not to jump, accusing Duvernois of conspiring to kill him. Sofía then appears and kisses César, while Pelayo watches from a distance. César expresses concern about what will happen to his friends, but Duvernois maintains that, despite their apparent emotions, they are merely artificial images lacking true sentience.

At the edge of the building, César takes a final look at Sofía, Pelayo, and Antonio before leaping from the roof. The screen turns black, and a woman's voice tells him to open his eyes, leaving his fate ambiguous.

== Cast ==
- Eduardo Noriega as César, a wealthy and confident young man who is successful with women
- Penélope Cruz as Sofía, an aspiring actress and César's love interest
- Chete Lera as Antonio, a forensic psychologist assigned to César while he is in jail
- Fele Martínez as Pelayo, César's best friend, who struggles with dating
- Najwa Nimri as Nuria, César's former sexual partner, who remains infatuated with him
- Gérard Barray as Duvernois, head of the Life Extension company
- Jorge de Juan as Encargado ('manager'), a Life Extension employee who explains the company's methods
- Miguel Palenzuela as Comisario ('commissioner'), a policeman who tells César that he struck Sofía
- Tristán Ulloa as Camarero ('server'), a bartender who fraternizes with César at the club

== Production ==
Filming took place in Madrid in 1996. For the opening sequence depicting César in a deserted Gran Vía, the production received permission from the city government to close the street to traffic during the early morning hours of 15 August 1996, a public holiday. The Life Extension headquarters building from which César leaps in the final scene is the Torre Picasso.

== Release ==
The film was theatrically released in Spain on 19 December 1997.

U.S. company Summit Entertainment acquired the film for its portfolio.

== Reception ==
=== Box office ===
In Spain, the film was a financial success, grossing 1.06 billion pesetas (€6.4 million) against a budget of 370 million pesetas (€2.2 million). It was the third highest-grossing Spanish film of 1998, behind Torrente, the Dumb Arm of the Law, and The Girl of Your Dreams. Internationally, Open Your Eyes grossed over $700,000, including $370,720 in the United States and Canada.

=== Critical reception ===
On Rotten Tomatoes, Open Your Eyes holds an approval rating of 87% based on reviews from 45 critics, with an average rating of 7.5/10. The site's critical consensus states: "Director Alejandro Amenábar tackles some heady issues with finesse and clarity in Open Your Eyes, a gripping exploration of existentialism and the human spirit". James Berardinelli of ReelViews gave the film three and a half stars out of four, opining that films "of this intelligence, audacity, and complexity come along so rarely that it's mandatory to cry out their arrival" and that "those who see it will not quickly forget the experience". Rob Blackwelder of SplicedWire gave the film four stars out of four, calling it "a jaw-dropping psychological thriller" that's "beautifully orchestrated".

Richard Scheib of Moria Science Fiction, Horror and Fantasy Film Review also gave Open Your Eyes four stars out of four, writing that it is "quite a remarkable film". Holly E. Ordway of DVD Active wrote "I don't give out “perfect 10” ratings lightly, but Open Your Eyes earns one by all accounts". By contrast, Aaron Beierle of DVD Talk gave the film a more mixed review, writing that he "found most of Open Your Eyes interesting", but adding that "there's something about the picture that kept me from being completely involved".

In 2002, Open Your Eyes was ranked No. 84 on the Top 100 Sci-Fi List by the Online Film Critics Society. Despite the film's critical reception, Amenábar stated in a 2016 retrospective that he considered it his worst film, explaining that he had written it as a teenager "who did not know anything about life".

== Soundtrack ==
Vol. #1

1. "Glamour" - Amphetamine Discharge (6:03)
2. "Risingson (Otherside Remix)" - Massive Attack (5:29)
3. "El detonador EMX-3" - Chucho (5:17)
4. "How do" - Sneaker Pimps (5:04)
5. "Sick of you" - Onion (4:28)
6. "T-sebo" - Side Effects (5:44)
7. "Flying away" - Smoke City (3:50)
8. "Arrecife" - Los Coronas (3:11)
9. "Yo mismo" - If (3:37)
10. "Tremble (goes the night)" - The Walkabouts (5:02)
11. "El detonador remix" – Chucho / Side Effects (5:01)

Vol. #2 (Instrumental)

1. "Abre los ojos" (2:28)
2. "Sofía" (1:12)
3. "Soñar es una mierda" (1:04)
4. "La operación" (1:33)
5. "¿Dónde está Sofía?" (0:54)
6. "El parque" (3:08)
7. "Hipnosis" (2:20)
8. "Quítate la careta" (2:56)
9. "Eres mi mejor amigo" (2:41)
10. "La única explicación" (2:05)
11. "Quiero verte" (6:38)
12. "Esa sonrisa" (0:53)
13. "Deja vu" (1:51)
14. "Excarcelación" (4:28)
15. "La vida" (1:46)
16. "La azotea" (5:21)
17. "Créditos finales" (3:31)

Source: Abre Los Ojos at Discogs (list of releases).

== Awards and nominations ==
Year	Award	Category	Nominee(s)	Result	Ref.
1999	13th Goya Awards	Best Film		Nominated	
1999	13th Goya Awards	Best Director	Alejandro Amenábar	Nominated	
1999	13th Goya Awards	Best Original Screenplay	Alejandro Amenábar y Mateo Gil	Nominated	
1999	13th Goya Awards	Best Actor	Eduardo Noriega	Nominated	
1999	13th Goya Awards	Best Editing	María Elena Sáinz de Rozas	Nominated	
1999	13th Goya Awards	Best Art Direction	Wolfgang Burmann	Nominated	
1999	13th Goya Awards	Best Production Supervision	Emiliano Otegui	Nominated	
1999	13th Goya Awards	Best Makeup and Hairstyles	Colin Arthur, Paca Almenara, Sylvie Imbert	Nominated	
1999	13th Goya Awards	Best Sound	Daniel Goldstein, Patrick Ghislain, Ricardo Steinberg	Nominated	
1999	13th Goya Awards	Best Special Effects	Reyes Abades, Alberto Esteban, Aurelio Sánchez	Nominated	

== Remake ==
In 1998, following the film's critical success, American actor Tom Cruise optioned the remake rights for Open Your Eyes through his company, Cruise/Wagner Productions. Directed by Cameron Crowe and released in 2001 under the title Vanilla Sky, the film stars Cruise in the lead role as David Aames, Jason Lee as his best friend, Brian Shelby, Penélope Cruz reprising her role as Sofia, Cameron Diaz as Julianna Gianni, the woman who disfigures David, and Kurt Russell as psychologist Curtis McCabe. Relocating the story from Madrid to New York City, Vanilla Sky closely follows the plot of Open Your Eyes but makes several alterations.

== See also ==
- List of Spanish films of 1997
- Ubik
