= The Consul of Sodom =

- Theatrical release poster
- Spanish: El cónsul de Sodoma
- Directed by: Sigfrid Monleón
- Written by: Miguel Dalmau
- Screenplay by: Joaquín Górriz; Miguel A Fernández; Sigfrid Monleón
- Based on: the biography by Miguel Dalmau
- Produced by: Andrés Vicente Gómez
- Starring: Jordi Mollà; Bimba Bosé; Àlex Brendemühl; Josep Linuesa; Isaac de los Reyes
- Cinematography: Jose David Garcia Montero
- Edited by: Pablo Blanco
- Music by: Joan Valvent
- Distributed by: Rodeo Media
- Release date: 11 December 2009
- Running time: 112 minutes
- Country: Spain
- Language: Spanish
- Box office: 335.848,24 €

The Consul of Sodom (Spanish: El cónsul de Sodoma) is a 2009 Spanish film directed by Sigfrid Monleón and starring Jordi Mollà. It is a biopic of the Catalan poet Jaime Gil de Biedma, based on a biography written by Miguel Dalmau.

== Plot ==
In 1959, Jaime Gil de Biedma, a wealthy poet from Barcelona, visits Manila on business trip as the director of the Philippine Tobacco Company. At night, he gives free rein to his homosexuality. He meets Johnny, a young man who works in an erotic nightclub, and they have sex. The poverty of Manila leaves a deep impression on Jaime and heightens his social conscience.

Back in Barcelona, the Spanish police interrogate Jaime about his subversive friends who still dream of regime change in Spain. Jaime is refused membership in the Communist Party because he is gay. He visits his friend, editor Carlos Barral, and meets Juan Marsé, a young writer about to publish his first novel.

Jaime treats his lover Luis, who is of humble background, with contempt. After a heated argument, Luis leaves him for good. Describing himself as "a Sunday poet with a Monday conscience", Jaime works for his family's company on weekdays and lives a bohemian lifestyle on weekends. Don Luis, his father, takes care of Jaime's troubles with the police, but warns Jaime he has to sort his life out because he is putting the family and business in jeopardy.

By the mid 1960s, Jaime's favorite spot is the Bocaccio nightclub, where he meets the sexy and enigmatic Bel, a divorced woman with two kids. They quickly enter a relationship. Bel is entangled in a bitter custody battle with her ex-husband. Jaime buys an apartment and asks Bel to marry him. She turns him down, as they are both free spirits. Jaime gets drunk. That same night, Bel dies in an accident. When he hears the news, Jaime tries to take his own life in despair. His friends and family help him get back on his feet. However, he vows never to write poetry again.

At the beginning of the 1970s, Jaime goes to the Philippines to deal with the company's economic changes under Ferdinand Marcos's dictatorship. On his return, Jaime meets Toni, a young photography assistant of humble background, and they begin a relationship. In spite of his class awareness, Jaime is attracted to men of lower background. Toni insists on learning all he can from Jaime and asks him to introduce him into his sophisticated world. At the beach with Toni and some friends, Jaime is moved to tears watching the freshness of a girl dancing with Toni. Now a middle-aged poet, Jaime is painfully aware of the passage of time, his misspent youth, and the death that awaits him. He writes in a poem: "What do you want now, youth, you impudent delight of life?" "What brings you to the beach? We old ones were content until you came along to wound us by reviving the most fearful of impossible dreams. You come to rummage through our imaginations."

Jaime's father dies. Growing tension between Jaime and Toni leads to a violent confrontation in the country house that Jaime bought as their love nest. Toni throws him out. Jaime falls and is injured in the snow. He nearly dies. "The fact that life was to be taken seriously we understand only later," he writes in another poem, "Like all young people, I was going to change the world. I wanted to make my mark and withdraw to applause. Growing old, dying, it was all a question of the size of the theater. But time has passed and I see the unpleasant truth. Growing old, dying, is the play's only plot."

Years later, old and tired, Jaime is living with a young stage actor. He learns that he has AIDS. His friends, knowing that Jaime is dying, organize a poetry recital at Madrid's famous Students Residence, which turns into a public celebration of the poet. Although old and dying, he still yearns for youth and beauty. He hires a young male prostitute. In the hotel room, he can only passively watch the young naked man dance to The Pet Shop Boys' song Always on My Mind.

== Cast ==
- Jordi Mollà - Jaime Gil de Biedma
- Bimba Bosé - Bel
- Priscilla Delgado - Bel´s daughter
- Àlex Brendemühl - Juan Marsé
- Josep Linuesa - Carlos Barral
- Isaac de los Reyes - Toni
- Marco Morales - Johnny
- Alfonso Begara - Luis
- Juli Mira - Don Luis, Jaime's father
- Isabelle Stoffel - Colita
- Vicky Peña - Doña Luisa, Jaime's mother
- Susana Fialho - Joaquina
- Marc Martínez - Víctor Anglada
- Biel Durán - Enrique Vila Matas
- Javier Coromina - Oriol Regás
- Jemi Paretas - Xavi Miserachs
- Manolo Solo - Meler
- Carmen Conesa - Marquesa
- Luis Hostalot - Inspector Creix
- Rosa Boladeras - Ivonne, Carlos Barral's wife
- Cristóbal Suárez - Benjamín
- Blanca Suárez - Sandra
- Miguel Mota - Luis Gil de Biedma
- Olga Esteban - Ani
- Raquel Gribler - Mercedes
- Isak Férriz - Pep Madern
- Luisa Martínez - Felisa
- Othello Rensoli - Jimmy Baldwin
- Aurora Cayer - Gitana
- Sandra Mur - Carmina Labra
- Antonio Navarro - Manuel Sacristán
- Rafael Rojas - Federico
- Manuel Sánchez - Alberto
- Emily Behr - Eve Marx
- Carlos Olaya - Juez
- Patxi Barco - Abogado
- Francisco Olmo - Doctor Reventós
- Christophe Miraval - Doctor Francés
- Paco Catalá - Garrido

== Reception ==
The Consul of Sodom was shot on location in Madrid, Barcelona and Manila. Shooting took place between 19 January 2009 and 3 April 2009. The film premiered on 11 December 2009. The film generally received good reviews. It was nominated to six Goya Awards including best actor for Jordi Mollà, but did not win any.

The film caused a stir in Spain, with the real-life Juan Marse, now a revered novelist, expressing his strong indignation in the national press. He referred to The Consul of Sodom as "grotesque, ridiculous, phony, absurd, dirty, pedantic, directed by an incompetent and ignorant fool, badly acted, with deplorable dialogue. It's a shameless film, with an infamous title and produced by unscrupulous people."
