= A+ (film) =

- Theatrical release poster
- Spanish: A+ (Amas)
- Directed by: Xavier Ribera Perpiñá
- Screenplay by: Xavier Ribera Perpiñá
- Starring: Eloy Azorín; Carlos Fuentes; Elvira Herrería; Misia; Ricardo Moya; Fernando Ramallo; Eloi Yebra; Jose Coronado; Najwa Nimri; Dani Macaco
- Cinematography: Julio Ribeyro
- Edited by: Xavier Ribera Perpiñá; Patrick Bosset
- Music by: Javier Navines; Jordi Grau; Andreas Frey
- Production companies: A+; Lateco; DeAPlaneta
- Distributed by: DeAPlaneta
- Release dates: April 2004 (Málaga); 28 May 2004 (Spain)
- Country: Spain
- Language: Spanish

A+ is a 2004 Spanish drama film directed and written by Xavier Ribera Perpiñá. Its cast features Eloy Azorín, Carlos Fuentes, Elvira Herrería, Misia, Ricardo Moya, Fernando Ramallo, Eloi Yebra, Jose Coronado, Najwa Nimri, and Macaco.

== Plot ==
Involving three intertwining stories, the plot follows Ace and his relationship with Mar, the journey of a group of three friends (Pau, Gus, and Ton) to a music festival, and the story of a maladjusted teenage girl (Luna).

== Cast ==
- Eloy Azorín as Ace
- Carlos Fuentes as Ton
- Elvira Herrería as Mar
- Misia as Luna
- Ricardo Moya as Dad
- Fernando Ramallo as Pau
- Eloi Yebra as Gus
- José Coronado as Leo
- Najwa Nimri as Dam
- Dani Macaco as Deal

== Production ==
The film was produced by A+, Lateco, and DeAPlaneta. Shooting locations included the Monegros Desert, the province of Castellón, Barcelona, and Madrid. Najwa Nimri, Macaco, and Ojos de Brujo composed themes for the film.

== Release ==
The film screened at the 7th Málaga Film Festival in 2004. Distributed by DeAPlaneta, the film was released theatrically in Spain on 28 May 2004.

== Reception ==
Jonathan Holland of Variety deemed the film to be "a distinctive, willfully edgy low-budgeter", getting "top marks for style but B− for substance".

Mirito Torreiro of Fotogramas rated the film 3 out of 5 stars, citing "the brazenness of the proposal" and the discovery of Elvira Herrería as positive elements.

F.M. of El Mundo gave the film a 0 rating, writing that "the bad thing is not so much the weak approach but its conception as a pretext to develop the aesthetics of an advertising film".

== See also ==
- List of Spanish films of 2004
