= Nunca pasa nada =

Nothing Ever Happens
- Directed by: Juan Antonio Bardem
- Written by: Juan Antonio Bardem; Alfonso Sastre; Henry-François Rey
- Produced by: Cesáreo González
- Starring: Corinne Marchand; Jean-Pierre Cassel; Julia Gutiérrez Caba; Antonio Casas
- Cinematography: Juan Julio Baena
- Music by: Georges Delerue
- Distributed by: Suevia Films
- Release date: 1963
- Running time: 95 minutes
- Countries: Spain; France
- Languages: Spanish; French

Nunca pasa nada (English: Nothing Ever Happens) is a 1963 Spanish-French drama film directed by Juan Antonio Bardem. Starring a mixed cast of French and Spanish actors it was shot both in Spanish and French. It was a commercial flop at the time of its release.

The film was entered into the Venice Film Festival. Julia Gutiérrez Caba was named Best Actress in Spain by the Cinema Writers Circle, and received the Fotogramas de Plata prize.

Nunca pasa nada depicts an environment and characters similar to the ones appearing in Bardem's great success, Calle Mayor (Main Street), to the point that some critics nicknamed it disdainfully Calle Menor (Minor Street). However, current evaluation of Bardem's works consider Nunca pasa nada a very appreciable film.

== Plot ==
A French variety company travels across Spain, coming back to France. Their bus stops when damaged in a small town in Castile, called Medina del Zarzal. The vedette star (showgirl) Jacqueline (Corinne Marchand) is sick and has to remain in the hospital where she is operated upon. The doctor (Antonio Casas) falls in love with her. She represents the freedom, the foreign, the forbidden. Her presence in the village is a revolution for all the people: students, priests, rich men. The doctor's wife, Julia (Julia Gutiérrez Caba), has to fight with the love proposition made by the local French language teacher (Jean-Pierre Cassel), the only person in town who can speak to the foreigner.

== Cast ==
- Corinne Marchand as Jacqueline
- Antonio Casas as Enrique
- Jean-Pierre Cassel as Juan
- Julia Gutiérrez Caba as Julia
- Pilar Gómez Ferrer as Doña Eulalia
- Ana María Ventura as Doña Assunta
- Matilde Muñoz Sampedro as Doña Obdulia
- Alfonso Godá as Pepe
- Rafael Bardem as Don Marcelino
