= Familia (1997 film) =

- Theatrical release poster
- Directed by: Fernando León de Aranoa
- Written by: Fernando León de Aranoa
- Produced by: Elías Querejeta
- Starring: Juan Luis Galiardo; Amparo Muñoz; Ágata Lys; Chete Lera; Elena Anaya; Raquel Rodrigo; Juan Querol; Aníbal Carbonero; André Falcon; Béatrice Camurat
- Cinematography: Alfredo Mayo
- Edited by: Nacho Ruiz Capillas
- Production companies: Elías Querejeta P.C.; Albares Production; MGN Filmes
- Distributed by: Alta Films
- Release date: 24 January 1997
- Running time: 95 minutes
- Countries: Spain; France
- Language: Spanish

Familia is a 1997 Spanish-French comedy-drama film written and directed by Fernando León de Aranoa.

== Plot ==
Santiago, a 55-year-old lonely man, hires a company of thespians to act as if they were his family on his birthday.

== Cast ==
- Juan Luis Galiardo as Santiago.
- Amparo Muñoz as Carmen.
- Ágata Lys as Sole.
- Chete Lera as Ventura.
- Elena Anaya as Luna.
- Raquel Rodrigo as Rosa.
- Juan Querol as Carlos.
- Aníbal Carbonero as Nico.
- André Falcon as Martín.
- Béatrice Camurat as Alicia.

== Production ==
Familia was produced by Elías Querejeta PC, Albares Production and MGM Filmes, with the participation of Televisión Española, Canal+ España and ESICMA and the support from Eurimages. It was shot in Madrid from 14 April to 17 June 1996. Outdoor shooting locations included the district of Chamartín.

== Release ==
Distributed by Alta Films, the film was theatrically released on 24 January 1997.

Following its release, the film was adapted into a stage play.

== Awards and nominations ==
| Year | Award | Category | Nominee(s) | Result | Ref. |
|---|---|---|---|---|---|
| 1998 | 12th Goya Awards | Best New Director | Fernando León de Aranoa | Won | |
| 1998 | 12th Goya Awards | Best Original Screenplay | Fernando León de Aranoa | Nominated | |

== See also ==
- List of Spanish films of 1997
