= English Striptease =

1975 film

- Directed by: José Luis Madrid
- Written by: José Luis Madrid
- Starring: Carmen Sevilla; Teresa Gimpera; Ágata Lys
- Cinematography: Enrique Salete
- Edited by: Luis Álvarez
- Music by: Ángel Arteaga
- Production company: K Films
- Distributed by: Manuel Salvador
- Release date: 1 December 1975
- Running time: 91 minutes
- Country: Spain
- Language: Spanish

English Striptease (Spanish: Strip-tease a la inglesa) is a 1975 Spanish comedy film directed by José Luis Madrid and starring Carmen Sevilla, Teresa Gimpera and Ágata Lys.

== Cast ==
- Teresa Gimpera
- Ágata Lys
- Juanito Navarro
- Antonio Ozores
- José Sazatornil
- Carmen Sevilla

== Bibliography ==
- Bentley, Bernard. A Companion to Spanish Cinema. Boydell & Brewer 2008.
