= Boy Missing =

- Theatrical release poster
- Spanish: Secuestro
- Directed by: Mar Targarona
- Written by: Oriol Paulo
- Produced by: Mar Targarona; Joaquín Padró
- Starring: Blanca Portillo; Antonio Dechent; Vicente Romero; Andrés Herrera; Nausicaa Bonnín; Macarena Gómez; José Coronado; José M. Pou; Marc Doménech
- Cinematography: Sergi Bartrolí
- Edited by: Juan Manuel Vilaseca
- Music by: Marc Vaillo
- Production company: Rodar y Rodar
- Distributed by: Sony Pictures Releasing de España
- Release date: 19 August 2016
- Running time: 105 minutes
- Country: Spain
- Language: Spanish

Boy Missing (Spanish: Secuestro, lit. 'Kidnapping') is a 2016 Spanish mystery thriller film directed by Mar Targarona from a screenplay by Oriol Paulo, starring Blanca Portillo.

== Premise ==
Disabled boy Víctor goes missing to the utter distress of his mother, lawyer Patricia de Lucas. Víctor reappears and claims he had been kidnapped by a man, but the alleged kidnapper walks free for lack of evidence. Patricia decides to take justice into her own hands.

== Cast ==
- Blanca Portillo as Patricia de Lucas
- Marc Doménech as Víctor
- Antonio Dechent as Ernesto Requena
- Vicente Romero as Carreño
- Macarena Gómez as Raquel
- Andrés Herrera as Charlie
- José Coronado as Raúl
- Nausicaa Bonnín as Vicky
- José María Pou as juez

== Production ==
The film was produced by Rodar y Rodar and it had the participation of RTVE, Cosmopolitan TV, TVC, and Movistar+.

Shooting locations in Catalonia included Barcelona, Tarragona, L'Hospitalet de Llobregat, Tavertet, and Terrassa.

== Release ==
Distributed by Sony Pictures Releasing de España, the film was released theatrically in Spain on 19 August 2016. It grossed €304,020 in its opening weekend.

== Reception ==
Jordi Costa of El País wrote that "any resemblance between this film and an incisive reading of our reality seems purely coincidental", with the outcome turning out to be "a string of plot twists and turns" and "a cast of dedicated actors" "trying to swim against the currents of implausibility".

Marta Medina of El Confidencial assessed that Targarona does not get the mise-en-scène to work well, with "the candor of some of the directorial bets significantly detracting from the result", some attempts at originality notwithstanding.

Pere Vall of Fotogramas rated the film 3 out of 5 stars, highlighting Portillo and the quinqui couple formed by Herrera and Gómez as the best things about the film.

Raquel Hernández Luján of HobbyConsolas rated the film with 50 points ('so so') deeming it to be "a thriller that finds its ballast in its key pieces: script, direction of actors and narrative fluidity".

Manuel J. Lombardo of Diario de Sevilla wrote about "the tonal and argumental nonsense of a film in which every element becomes a cliché·.

== See also ==
- List of Spanish films of 2016
