= The Idiot Maiden =

- Theatrical release poster
- Spanish: La dama boba
- Directed by: Manuel Iborra
- Screenplay by: Manuel Iborra
- Based on: A Lady of Little Sense by Félix Lope de Vega
- Starring: Silvia Abascal; Jose Coronado; Macarena Gómez; Roberto Sanmartín; Verónica Forqué; Juan Díaz; María Vázquez; Paco León; Antonio Resines
- Cinematography: Juan Molina Temboury
- Edited by: Iván Aledo
- Music by: Luis Ivars
- Production companies: DeAPlaneta PC; Belén Gómez PC; PC Flamenco Films
- Release dates: 23 March 2006 (Málaga); 24 March 2006 (Spain)
- Running time: Spanish
- Country: Spain
- Language: Spanish
- Box office: EUR3,000,000

The Idiot Maiden (Spanish: La dama boba) is a 2006 Spanish romantic comedy film directed and written by Manuel Iborra, consisting of an adaptation of the 1613 play A Lady of Little Sense by Félix Lope de Vega. It stars Silvia Abascal, Jose Coronado, Macarena Gómez, Roberto San Martín, and Verónica Forqué.

== Plot ==
Set in the 16th century, the plot follows the romantic entanglement of two sisters (Finea and Nise) with Laurencio and Liseo.

== Cast ==
- Silvia Abascal as Finea
- José Coronado as Laurencio
- Macarena Gómez as Nise
- Roberto Sanmartín as Liseo
- Juan Díaz as Pedro
- Verónica Forqué as Otavia
- Paco León as Maestro de baile
- Antonio Resines as Maestro de letras
- María Vázquez as Clara
- José M. Sacristán as Feniso
- Cristina Collado as Gerarda
- Antonio de la Fuente as Duardo

== Production ==
The film is a DeAPlaneta PC, Flamenco Films and Belén Gómez production. It was shot in 2005 at Ciudad de la Luz in Alicante, being the first film to be shot in the film studio.

== Release ==
The film was presented at the 9th Málaga Film Festival in March 2006. It was theatrically released in Spain on 24 March 2006.

== Accolades ==
Year	Award	Category	Nominee(s)	Result	Ref.
2006	9th Málaga Film Festival	Silver Biznaga for Best Actress	Silvia Abascal	Won	
2006	9th Málaga Film Festival	Silver Biznaga for Best Supporting Actress	Macarena Gómez	Won	
2006	9th Málaga Film Festival	Silver Biznaga for Best Supporting Actor	Roberto San Martín	Won	
2006	9th Málaga Film Festival	Silver Biznaga for Best Costume Design	Lorenzo Caprile	Won	
2007	21st Goya Awards	Best Actress	Silvia Abascal	Nominated	

== See also ==
- List of Spanish films of 2006
