= Ágata Lys =

Spanish film, television and theatre actress

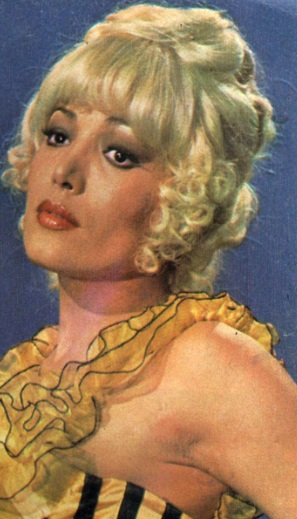
- Ágata Lys in 1977
- Born: Margarita García San Segundo; 3 December 1953; Valladolid, Spain
- Died: 12 November 2021 (aged 67); Benalmádena, Málaga, Spain
- Education: University of Valladolid
- Occupation: Actress
- Years active: 1972–2004
- Spouse: Fernando Soto (m. 1982; died 2017)

Ágata Lys (born Margarita García San Segundo; 3 December 1953 – 12 November 2021) was a Spanish film, television and theatre actress, associated with the cinema of the destape (sexploitation) during the Spanish transition to democracy.

== Early life ==
Lys was born in Valladolid. She studied Philosophy and Letters at the University of Valladolid before moving to Madrid to study Dramatic Art. At the age of 17 she made her stage debut at the Lope de Vega Theatre in Valladolid as Doña Inés in Don Juan Tenorio. In 1972 she debuted on television as a hostess on game show Un, dos, tres... responda otra vez, where her popularity quickly grew due to her screen presence and image.

== Career ==
After leaving Un, dos, tres…, Lys soon entered cinema, where she appeared in numerous productions throughout the 1970s. She became closely associated with erotic and destape films, appearing in titles such as Cabaret Woman and La nueva Marilyn, which earned her the nickname “the Spanish Marilyn”. In 1977 she portrayed a transgender woman in El transexual, one of the earliest such representations in Spanish cinema.

From the late 1970s onwards, Lys sought more complex roles and gradually moved away from the erotic label. She appeared in films by leading directors, including The Holy Innocents by Mario Camus, Taxi by Carlos Saura and Familia by Fernando León de Aranoa. Lys received critical recognition for this second stage of her career. Alongside cinema, she maintained an active presence in theatre and television, participating in productions for Televisión Española and in numerous stage works.

== Later life and death ==
Her final film appearance was in Mala uva (2004). She later appeared in the television series Amar en tiempos revueltos before retiring from professional life. Lys lived in voluntary retirement in Benalmádena, on the Costa del Sol. She died on 12 November 2021, aged 67. Her death was made public several weeks later. Journalist and writer Valeria Vegas revealed the death on her Instagram account. She stated "She actually died a little over 40 days ago, in a mysterious (and unfair) silence that hasn't reached the media or the profession".

== Filmography (selection) ==
- Fuzzy the Hero (1973)
- Cabaret Woman (1974)
- Pasqualino Cammarata, Frigate Captain (1974)
- English Striptease (1975)
- El transexual (1977)
- The Frenchman's Garden (1978)
- The Holy Innocents (1984)
- The Return of the Musketeers (1989) – Duchesse de Longueville* Familia (1996)
- Taxi (1996)
- Kill Me Tender (2003)
- Mala uva (2004)

== Theatre (selection) ==
- Don Juan Tenorio (1971)
- The Merchant of Venice (1981)
- La Lola se va a los puertos (1987)
- Life Is a Dream (1988)
- Un golpe de suerte (1995)

== Television (selection) ==
- Un, dos, tres... responda otra vez (1972)
- Don Juan (1974)
- La saga de los Rius (1976)
- The Merchant of Venice (1981)
- Ocho mujeres (1989)
- Puerta con puerta (1999)
- Amar en tiempos revueltos (2005-2006)
