= Martín (Hache) =

- Spanish theatrical release poster
- Directed by: Adolfo Aristarain
- Written by: Adolfo Aristarain; Kathy Saavedra
- Produced by: Gerardo Herrero; Javier López Blanco; Adolfo Aristarain
- Starring: Federico Luppi; Juan Diego Botto; Cecilia Roth; Eusebio Poncela; Sancho Gracia; Ana María Picchio
- Cinematography: Porfirio Enríquez
- Edited by: Fernando Pardo
- Music by: Fito Páez
- Distributed by: Líder Films (Argentina); Alta Films (Spain)
- Release dates: 17 April 1997 (Argentina); 26 September 1997 (Spain)
- Running time: 134 minutes
- Countries: Argentina; Spain
- Language: Spanish
- Budget: 200 million ₧

Martín (Hache) (Note: The title makes reference to the name of the son of Martín, portrayed by Juan Diego Botto, who is named after his father but with an "h" in brackets, which means hijo ("son" in Spanish; hache is the Spanish name for the letter 'H'). It is similar to calling a son named for his father "Junior" in English. The movie's English subtitles translate "Hache" as "Jay," since "jay" is the English name for the first letter in "junior" and is also a common English given name.) [maɾˈtin ˈatʃe] is a 1997 Argentine and Spanish film directed by Adolfo Aristarain and starring Federico Luppi, Juan Diego Botto, Cecilia Roth and Eusebio Poncela.

== Plot ==
Martín, known as "Hache," is a 19-year-old Argentinian boy. After his girlfriend leaves him, he has a nearly fatal drug overdose (thought by many to be an attempted suicide). Afterwards, his mother sends him to Madrid to live with his father, Martín.

Martín, a successful filmmaker, does not want to take care of his son because he likes living alone and being able to socialize with his two friends, Alicia and Dante, without influencing his son in any negative way since both Alicia and Dante are experienced drug users. Regardless, he brings him into his home, hoping to ward off any evil influences that might cause his son to have a relapse and commit suicide.

As time passes and Martín's friendships get more strained, it becomes clear that Hache needs to leave his father's place and make a name for himself.

== Cast ==
- Federico Luppi as Martín
- Juan Diego Botto as Hache
- Eusebio Poncela as Dante
- Cecilia Roth as Alicia
- Ana María Picchio as Blanca
- Sancho Gracia as José María Navarro
- José María Sacristán as Schauva
- Joaquín A. Colmenares as coracero
- Ángel Amorós as productor teatro
- Kojun Notsu as joven oriental
- Esther Herrera as niña andrógina
- Marisa Cabezón as mujer espejo
- Enrique Liporace as Migue
- Claudia Gallegos as Lea
- Leonora Balcarce as Nadia
- Nahuel Mutti as Godo
- Nicolás Pauls as Leo

== Production ==
The film was filmed in Buenos Aires, Argentina; Madrid, and Almería, Spain.

== Release ==
The film was the fifth most watched domestic film in Argentina, with 380,000 admissions. It was released theatrically in Spain on 26 September 1997.

== Accolades ==
It was nominated for four Goya Awards in 1998, and Cecilia Roth won one for lead actress. It also 4 Silver Condors (Argentina film awards); for Best Director (Adolfo Aristarain), Best Actor (Federico Luppi), Best Actress (Cecilia Roth) and Best Supporting Actor (Eusebio Poncela).

== See also ==
- List of Argentine films of 1997
- List of Spanish films of 1997

== Bibliography ==
- Benavent, Francisco María (2000). Cine español de los 90. Diccionario de películas, directores y temático. Bilbao: Ediciones Mensajero. pp. 372–373. ISBN 84-271-2326-4.
- Devesa, Dolores; Potes, Alicia (2003). "Adolfo Aristarain. Filmografía" (PDF). Nosferatu (43): 107–111. ISSN 1131-9372.
