= Silvia Abascal =

Spanish actress

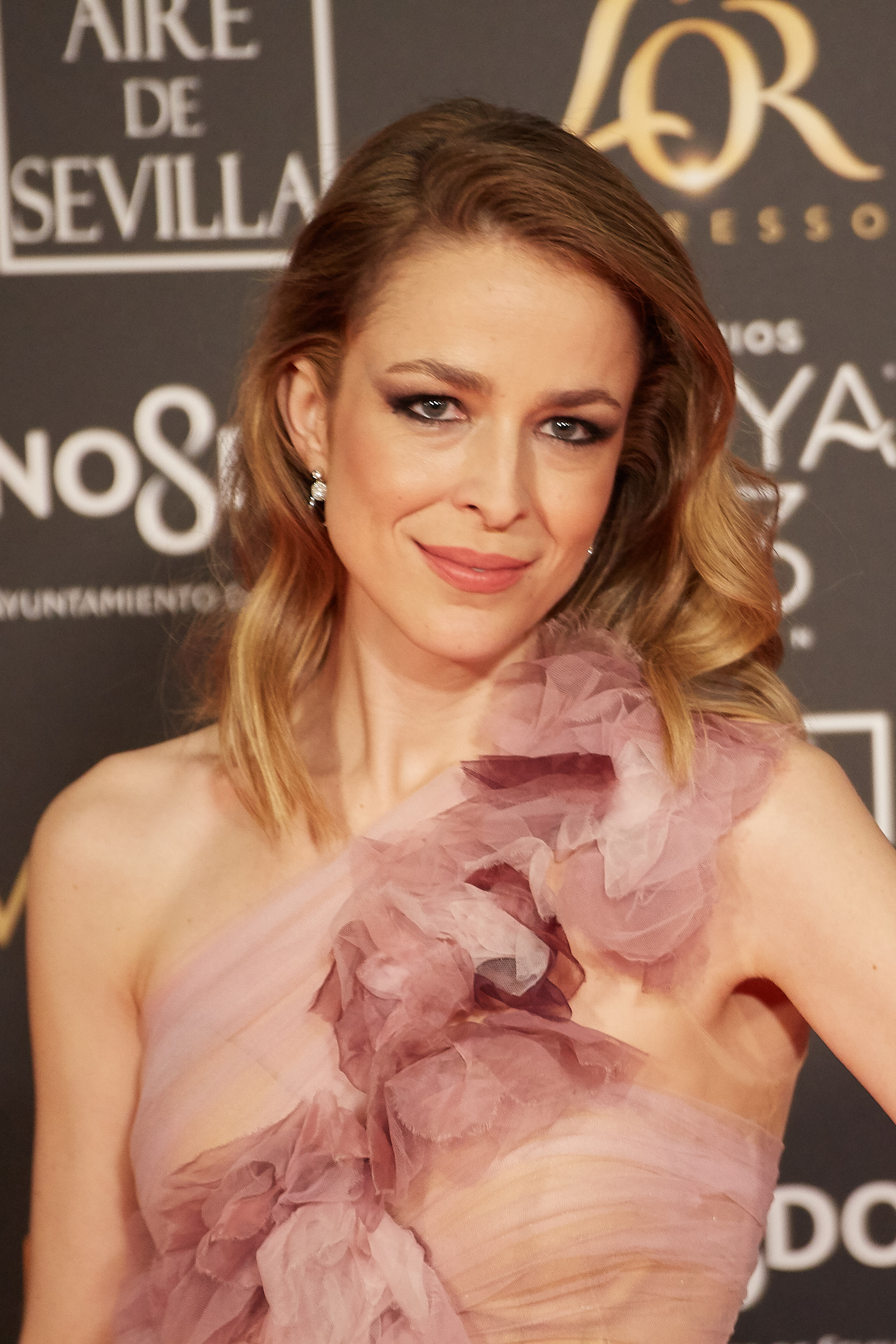
- Attending the 33rd Goya Awards in 2019
- Born: Silvia Abascal Estrada; 20 March 1979 (age 47); Madrid, Spain
- Occupation: Actress

Silvia Abascal Estrada (born 20 March 1979) is a Spanish film, television and stage actress. She landed a breakthrough role in 1995 sitcom Pepa y Pepe that advanced her career. She has since featured in films such as The Yellow Fountain, The Wolf, and The Idiot Maiden.

== Biography ==
Silvia Abascal Estrada was born on 20 March 1979 in Madrid. She made her television debut in the game show Un, dos, tres... responda otra vez at the age of 14.

She advanced her career with her performance in the 1995 sitcom series Pepa y Pepe, in which she played Clarita, the middle sibling in the protagonist family characterised as a sarcastic and macabre yet also sensible grunge-loving teenager. She trained her acting chops under Juan Carlos Corazza. She landed her feature film debut in Time of Happiness (1997). Her performance in The Yellow Fountain as Lola, a half-Spanish half-Chinese wild child, earned her a nomination to the Goya Award for Best New Actress.

She was appointed as a UNICEF Goodwill Ambassador in 2003.

In April 2011, Abascal suffered a stroke that temporarily halted her career. Ten months later, she made a comeback to the spotlight attending the gala of the 26th Goya Awards. She made an appearance in the 2015 film Pasaje de vida.

== Filmography ==
Key
†	Denotes works that have not yet been released

=== Film ===
Year	Title	Role	Notes	Ref
1997	El tiempo de la felicidad (Time of Happiness)	Verónica		
1999	La fuente amarilla (The Yellow Fountain)	Lola		
2001	La voz de su amo (His Master's Voice)	Marta		
2002	A mi madre le gustan las mujeres (My Mother Likes Women)	Sol		
2004	El lobo (The Wolf)	Begoña		
2005	Vida y color (Life and Colour)	Begoña		
2006	La dama boba (The Idiot Maiden)	Finea		
2007	Enloquecidas (Crazy)	Blanca		
2007	Escuchando a Gabriel	Sara		
2008	El amor se mueve			
2010	La herencia Valdemar (The Valdemar Legacy)	Luisa Llorente		
2010	La herencia Valdemar II: La sombra prohibida (The Valdemar Legacy II: The Forbidden Shadow)	Luisa Llorente		
2015	Pasaje de vida (Safe Passage)	Ariadna		
2015	Francisco, el padre Jorge (Francis: Pray for Me)	Ana		
2015	Ma ma	Enfermera		
2015	Truman	Mónica		
2022	Asombrosa Elisa (Amazing Elisa)	Úrsula		

=== Television ===
Year	Title	Role	Notes	Ref
1995	Pepa y Pepe	Clarita		
1999–2000	El comisario			
2002	Viento del pueblo: Miguel Hernández	Josefina Manresa	Miniseries	
2009	Acusados	Laura Nieto		
2011	Piratas	Blanca Díaz de Andrade		
2018	La catedral del mar (Cathedral of the Sea)	Elionor		
2021	La cocinera de Castamar (The Cook of Castamar)	Reina Isabel de Farnesio		
2021	Cuéntame cómo pasó	María Alcántara	Introduced in season 21. Younger versions portrayed by Esmeralda García, Celine Peña, Paula Gallego, and Carmen Climent	
2022	¡García! (García!)	Catalina Bellido		
2023	Montecristo	Mercedes Herrera		
2025	Asuntos internos	Ana Villacastín		

=== Music videos ===
Year	Artist	Song	Ref.
2007	Diego Martín	"Puestos a Pedir"	

== Theatre ==
- La gaviota (2010)
- Días de vino y rosas (2009–10)
- Gatas (2008)
- Siglo XX... que estás en los cielos (2006)
- Historia de una vida (2005)

== Awards and nominations ==
Year	Award	Category	Work	Result	Ref.
2000	14th Goya Awards	Best New Actress	The Yellow Fountain	Nominated	
2005	19th Goya Awards	Best Supporting Actress	The Wolf	Nominated	
2005	14th Actors and Actresses Union Awards	Best Film Actress in a Secondary Role	The Wolf	Nominated	
2006	15th Actors and Actresses Union Awards	Best Stage Actress in a Leading Role	Historia de una vida	Nominated	
2006	9th Málaga Film Festival	Silver Biznaga for Best Actress	The Idiot Maiden	Won	
2007	21st Goya Awards	Best Actress	The Idiot Maiden	Nominated	
