= Manuel Manquiña =

Spanish actor (born 1953)

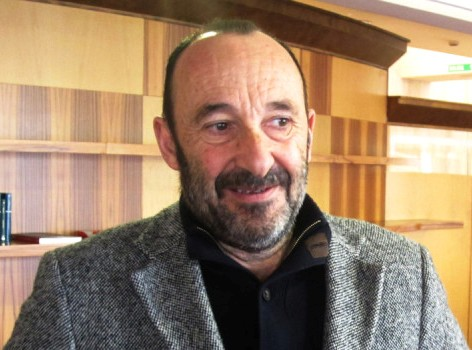
- Manquiña in 2013
- Born: Manuel Prieto Comesaña; August 2, 1953 (age 71); Vigo, Spain
- Occupation: Actor

Manuel Prieto Comesaña (born 2 August 1953), known artistically as Manuel Manquiña, is a Spanish actor from Galicia.

== Biography ==
Manuel Prieto Comesaña was born on 2 August 1953 in Vigo. He began his career in 1982 in several television comedy shows by Galician public broadcaster TVG and several movies directed by Galician filmmakers like Antonio Blanco in La matanza caníbal de los garrulos lisérgicos and Xavier Valverde's Tacón and Continental. In 1997 received acknowledgment after acting in Juanma Bajo Ulloa's Airbag and Torrente, el brazo tonto de la ley. Other films and TV series are Héroes and Historias de Bolsillo written by himself and Moncloa ¿dígame?, Manolito Gafotas (based on Elvira Lindo's child books) with others and Memoirs of a Man in Pajamas as Messenger.
