= Airbag (film) =

1997 Spanish film

- Theatrical release poster
- Directed by: Juanma Bajo Ulloa
- Screenplay by: Karra Elejalde; Juanma Bajo Ulloa; Fernando Guillén Cuervo
- Story by: Karra Elejalde
- Produced by: Adrian Lipp; Iñaki Burutxaga
- Starring: Karra Elejalde; Fernando Guillén Cuervo; Alberto San Juan; Maria de Medeiros; Manuel Manquiña; Karlos Arguiñano; Luis Cuenca; Rosa María Sardà; Pilar Bardem; Francisco Rabal
- Cinematography: Gonzalo Berridi
- Edited by: Pablo Blanco
- Music by: Bingen Mendizábal
- Production companies: Asegarce Zinema; Marea Films; Road Movies Dritte Produktionen; MGN Filmes
- Distributed by: Hispano Foxfilm
- Release date: 20 June 1997 (Spain)
- Running time: 112 minutes
- Countries: Spain; Germany; Portugal
- Languages: Spanish; Portuguese
- Budget: $6 million
- Box office: 1,152 million ₧ (Spain)

Airbag is a 1997 Spanish action comedy film directed by Juanma Bajo Ulloa. It stars Fernando Guillén Cuervo and Karra Elejalde, who co-wrote the screenplay with Bajo Ulloa, which was based on an original story by Elejalde. Alberto San Juan, Maria de Medeiros, Manuel Manquiña, Karlos Arguiñano, and Luis Cuenca appear in supporting roles.

== Plot ==
Juantxo is a rich, barely out of school lawyer, who has proposed to the daughter of a rich socialite. While on a stag party with his two best friends, Konra and Pako, he accidentally loses his engagement ring while visiting a prostitute. After leaving the brothel, Juantxo realizes the ring is not on his finger and turns around to recover it only to find out her pimp has taken the ring. In order to find the ring, Juantxo and his friends go looking for Villambrosa, the pimp, at another brothel he owns. While there, Juantxo, Konra and Pako get mistaken for a band of drug couriers that are moving cocaine hidden in car airbags for Souza, another pimp/drug dealer that has a tense business relation with Villambrosa. While there the money and drug exchange goes wrong without notice which sparks a war between the two rival organizations.The friends move on to the next brothel in search of Villambrosa when they get pullover by a cop for speeding and while they are being interrogated, the car’s airbags deploy and explode releasing the cocaine inside the car. From then on the friends embark on a crazy drug induced journey to recoup the ring while being oblivious of the drug war they have accidentally created.

== Cast ==
- Karra Elejalde as Juantxo
- Fernando Guillén Cuervo as Konradín
- Alberto San Juan as Pako
- Maria de Medeiros as Fátima do Espíritu Santo
- Manuel Manquiña as Pazos
- Karlos Arguiñano as Don Serafín
- Luis Cuenca as Souza
- Francisco Rabal as Villambrosa
- Rosa Maria Sardà as Aurora
- Javier Bardem as José Alberto 'Amor Obsoleto'
- Pilar Bardem as La Herme
- Rossy de Palma as Carmina
- Vicenta Ndongo as Vanessa
- Raquel Meroño as Araceli
- Santiago Segura as candidato Paíño
- Nathalie Seseña as Argentina 'Scándalo'
- Juanjo Puigcorbé as jugador
- Olvido Gara as jugadora Alaska
- David Trueba as reportero

== Production ==
The film is a Spanish-German-Portuguese co-production by Asegarce Zinema, Marea Films, Road Movies Dritte Produktionen, and MGN Filmes.

== Reception ==
The film was hugely successful in Spain, grossing $609,312 in its first week of release from 131 screens and was in the top 10 for 19 weeks. It was the highest-grossing Spanish film of the year with a gross of 1,152 million Spanish Pesetas.

== Awards and nominations ==
=== Film Awards ===
Year	Film Festival	Award	Category
1998	Goya Awards	Won	Best Special Effects
1998	Goya Awards	Won	Best Editing
1998	Fantasia Festival	2nd Place	Best International Film

=== Submissions ===
- Goya Awards
  - Best New Actor for Manuel Manquiña (nominated)
- British Independent Film Awards
  - Best Foreign Independent Film (nominated)

== See also ==
- List of Spanish films of 1997
