= Blanca Portillo =

Spanish actress

- Portillo in 2026
- Born: Blanca Portillo Martínez de Velasco; 15 June 1963 (age 63); Madrid, Spain
- Education: RESAD
- Occupations: Actress; theatre director; theatre producer

Blanca Portillo Martínez de Velasco (born 15 June 1963) is a Spanish film, television, and stage actress. She has also worked as theatre director and producer. She made her feature film debut in Entre rojas (1995). She became popular for her portrayal of Carlota in sitcom television series Siete vidas. Portillo is the recipient of numerous accolades, including a Goya Award for Best Actress.

== Life and career ==
Blanca Portillo Martínez de Velasco was born in Madrid on 15 June 1963.

Portillo started as an actress in several small theater productions. She earned a degree in drama from the RESAD.

One of her most important performances afterwards was her role of Carol in Oleanna by David Mamet, directed by Joaquín Kremel in 1994.

She made her feature film debut in Entre rojas (1995). In 1996, Luis San Narciso cast her for the hit Telecinco series 7 vidas. The series lasted for ten years and ran for 204 episodes. Portillo played the role of Carlota, an insecure but brassy hairdresser who married Gonzalo, the owner of a bar which functioned as the central set of the show.

She played a mother in The Color of the Clouds (1997). Her performance in the film earned her a nomination to the Goya Award for Best New Actress. She also participated in the European Spanish dubbing of Finding Nemo. In spite of her success in film and television, she has continued taking part in stage plays both as an actress and as a director.

In 2004, she left 7 vidas to undertake a theatrical project in Argentina named La hija del aire (The daughter of Air) based on a book by Calderón de la Barca. She combined her work on this play with the film Elsa y Fred (2005) in which she plays a woman suspicious of the relationship between her elderly father and his Argentinian neighbor.

In the 2005 film Alatriste, based on a book by Arturo Pérez Reverte, she played a male role, specifically that of a member of the Spanish Inquisition. She shaved her head for the role. The following year, Pedro Almodóvar cast her in his 2006 film Volver. She played Agustina, a friend of the central family who is terminally ill and looking for her missing mother.

She then appeared in Goya's Ghosts by Miloš Forman, playing 18th-century consort Maria Luisa of Parma, and landed her first starring role in a movie in Gracia Querejeta's film Seven Billiard Tables. Here she played the lover of the owner of a billiard club and the daughter of Amparo Baró, her former co-star from 7 Vidas. In 2009, she featured again in a film by Pedro Almodóvar, Broken Embraces playing the role of Judit.

Her work in recent years has seen a return to Spanish television, including a role in Hospital Central, and directing roles in the theater. She had a small role in the 2011 film As Luck Would Have It, starring alongside Salma Hayek.

She starred in the 2016 film Boy Missing.

== Filmography ==
=== Film ===
Key
†	Denotes films that have not yet been released

Year	Title	Role	Notes	Ref.
1995	Entre rojas	Manuela	Feature film debut	
1996	Eso	Marta		
1996	El perro del hortelano (The Dog in the Manger)	Dorotea		
1997	El color de las nubes (The Color of the Clouds)			
1999	Entre las piernas (Between Your Legs)			
2001	Solo mía (Mine Alone)			
2003	Finding Nemo	Peach	Voice in the European Spanish track	
2005	Elsa y Fred (Elsa & Fred)	Cuca		
2006	Volver	Agustina		
2006	Alatriste	Fray Emilio Bocanegra		
2006	Goya's Ghosts	Queen Maria Luisa		
2007	Siete mesas de billar francés (Seven Billiard Tables)	Charo		
2008	El patio de mi cárcel (My Prison Yard)	Adela		
2009	Los abrazos rotos (Broken Embraces)	Judit García		
2011	La chispa de la vida (As Luck Would Have It)	Mercedes		
2016	Secuestro (Boy Missing)	Patricia de Lucas		
2020	Invisibles (The Invisible)	Mara		
2020	Retrato de mujer blanca con pelo canoso y arrugas (Portrait of White Woman with Grey Hair and Wrinkles)	Julia		
2021	Maixabel	Maixabel Lasa		
2023	Teresa	Teresa		
2024	Escape	Doctor Giráldez		
2025	Día de caza (Ladies' Hunting Party)	Blanca		

=== Television ===
- 7 vidas (1999–2004)
- Acusados (2009–2010)
- Promesas de arena (2019)
- Días mejores (2022)
- La ley del mar (2024)

== Theatre credits ==
Actress

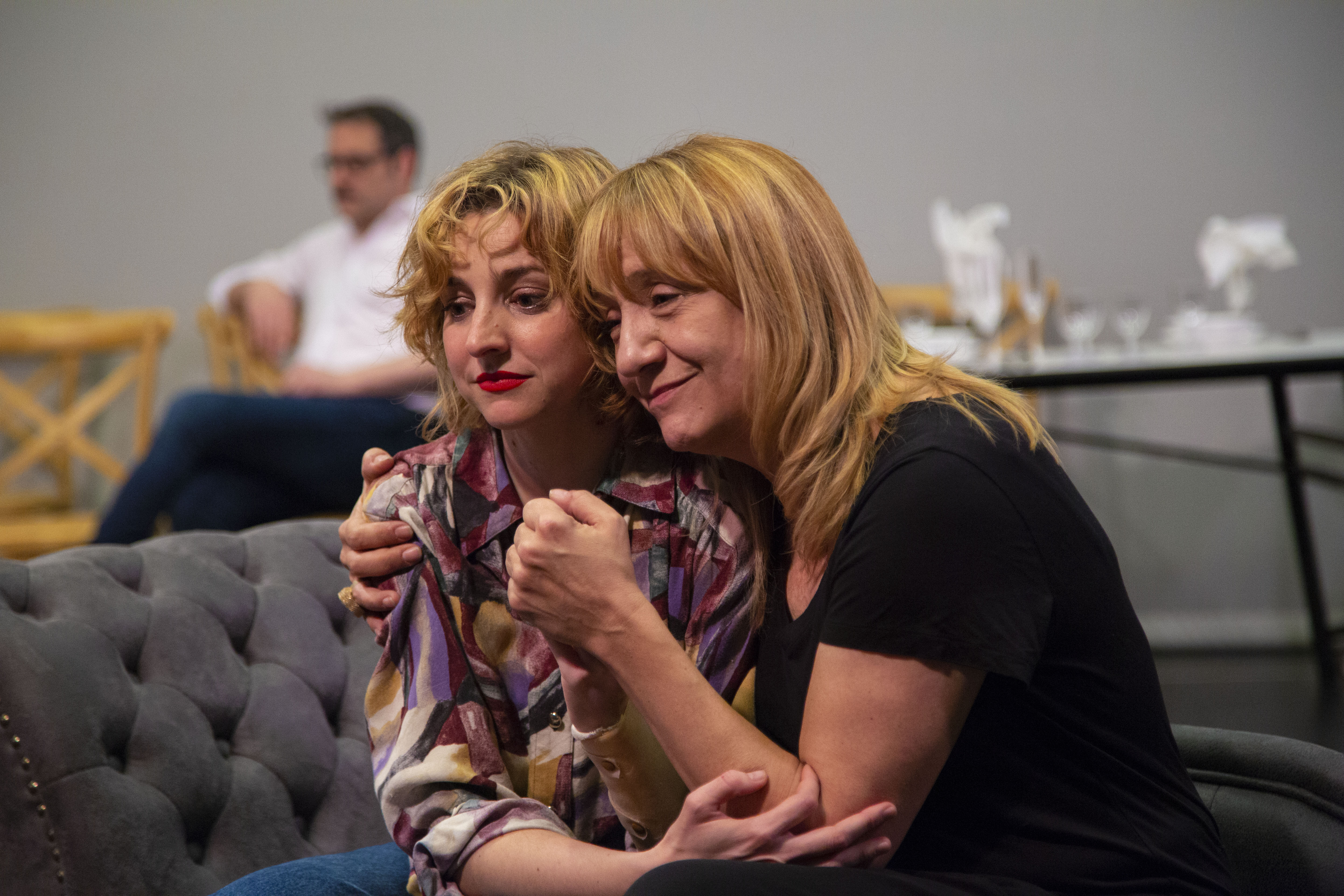
Portillo and Anna Moliner during a staging of Mrs. Dalloway at the Teatro Español in 2019.

- La madre de Frankenstein (2023)
- La vida es sueño (2012)
- La avería (2012)
- Antígona (2011)
- Paseo romántico (2010-2011)
- Medea (2009)
- Hamlet (2009)
- Barroco (2007-2008)
- Mujeres soñaron caballos (2007).
- Afterplay (2006-2007).
- Hamelin (2005).
- La hija del viento (2004–2005).
- Desorientados (2003)
- Como en las mejores familias (2003).
- A Midsummer Night's Dream (2002)
- El matrimonio de Bostón (2001)
- Madre, el drama padre (1998)
- No hay burlas para el amor (1998).
- Un fénix demasiado frecuente (1997)
- Esclavos (1997)
- Mujeres frente al espejo (1996)
- El embrujado (1995)
- Un bala perdida (1995)
- Terror y miseria del Tercer Reich (1995)
- Bodas de sangre (1994)
- Oleanna (1994)
- Las troyanas (1993)
- Marat-Dade (1992)
- Cuento de invierno (1992)
- Lope de Aguirre, traidor (1988)
- El mal de la juventud (1985)

Director

- La avería (2011)
- Siglo XX... que estás en los cielos (2006)
- Desorientados (2004)
- Shakespeare a pedazos (1999)
- Hay amores que hablan (1997)

== Accolades ==
Year	Award	Category	Work	Result	Ref.
1998	7th Actors Union Awards	Best Stage Performance in a Secondary Role	Eslavos	Won	
1998	12th Goya Awards	Best New Actress	The Colour of the Clouds	Nominated	
2004	13th Actors and Actresses Union Awards	Best Stage Actress in a Secondary Role	Como en las mejores familias	Won	
2005	14th Actors and Actresses Union Awards	Best Stage Actress in a Leading Role	La hija del aire	Won	
2006	58th Cannes Film Festival	Best Actress	Volver	Won	
2007	21st Goya Awards	Best Supporting Actress	Volver	Nominated	
2007	16th Actors and Actresses Union Awards	Best Film Actress in a Secondary Role	Volver	Won	
2008	17th Actors and Actresses Union Awards	Best Stage Actress in a Leading Role	Barroco	Nominated	
2010	19th Actors and Actresses Union Awards	Best Film Actress in a Secondary Role	Broken Embraces	Nominated	
2010	19th Actors and Actresses Union Awards	Best Television Actress in a Leading Role	Acusados	Nominated	
2013	22nd Actors and Actresses Union Awards	Best Stage Actress in a Leading Role	Life Is a Dream	Won	
2014	23rd Actors and Actresses Union Awards	Best Television Actress in a Leading Role	Stolen Children	Nominated	
2008	22nd Goya Awards	Best Actress	Seven Billiard Tables	Nominated	
2018	5th Feroz Awards	Best Main Actress in a Series	Sé quién eres	Nominated	
2018	27th Actors and Actresses Union Awards	Best Stage Actress in a Leading Role	El cartógrafo	Nominated	
2021	27th Forqué Awards	Best Actress in a Film	Maixabel	Won	
2022	77th CEC Medals	Best Actress	Maixabel	Won	
2022	36th Goya Awards	Best Actress	Maixabel	Won	
2022	30th Actors and Actresses Union Awards	Best Film Actress in a Leading Role	Maixabel	Nominated	
2022	10th Platino Awards	Best Actress in a Film	Maixabel	Won	
2023	29th Forqué Awards	Best Actress in a Film	Teresa	Nominated	
2024	79th CEC Medals	Best Actress	Teresa	Nominated	
2024	32nd Actors and Actresses Union Awards	Best Stage Actress in a Leading Role	La madre de Frankenstein	Nominated	
2025	33rd Actors and Actresses Union Awards	Best Stage Actress in a Leading Role	1936	Nominated	

Candidatura al premio de Mejor Actriz Revelación (1997). Unión de Actores

- Candidata al Premio a la Mejor Actriz de Televisión (2002).

Fotogramas de Plata

- Candidata al premio de Mejor Actriz de Teatro (2003).
