= Chete Lera =

Spanish actor (1949–2022)

- Born: Ramón Mariano Fernández Lera; 1949; A Estrada, Spain
- Died: 19 May 2022 (aged 72); Rincón de la Victoria, Spain
- Occupation: Actor

Ramón Mariano Fernández Lera (1949–2022), better known as Chete Lera, was a Spanish actor. With a long on-screen career in addition to a stage career, he featured in films such as The Red Squirrel, Secrets of the Heart, Familia, Barrio, Open Your Eyes, Flores de otro mundo, and Full Moon.

== Biography ==
Ramón Mariano Fernández Lera was born in 1949 in A Estrada, Province of Pontevedra. He was raised for most of his childhood in Corcubión, and then moved to Madrid. Prior to acting he was an aeronautic engineer, pilot, bank teller and studied psychology. He began a career as a stage actor in the late 1970s, including his performance in the Eduardo Fuentes-directed stage play Cabaret Castizo (premiered in Madrid on 5 January 1993), portraying a sheriff making a parody out of authoritarian Madrid city councillor Ángel Matanzo; Matanzo's attempts to bring down the play eventually prompted his own sacking from the municipal government board. One of his most well known film credits was that of the psychiatrist in Alejandro Amenábar's Abre los ojos.

He won the Silver Biznaga for Best Actor in the 2002 Málaga Film Festival together with the rest of the cast of Smoking Room.

His television work includes performances in Los ladrones van a la oficina, Médico de familia or Cuéntame cómo pasó. His last television work was his performance as Ramón in Mira lo que has hecho.

He died on 19 May 2022, age 72, in the wake of a car accident in Rincón de la Victoria. He was the single occupant of a vehicle that went off the road and fell down a 50-metre steep slope, landing on a plantation.

== Filmography ==
Film

Year	Title	Role	Notes	Ref
1991	Todo por la pasta (Anything for Bread)	Jefe Portugueses	Feature film debut	
1993	La ardilla roja (The Red Squirrel)	Salvador		
1997	Familia	Ventura		
1997	Secretos del corazón (Secrets of the Heart)	Ricardo		
1997	Abre los ojos (Open Your Eyes)	Antonio		
1998	Barrio	Comisario		
1999	Extraños (Strangers)	Marcos		
1999	Flores de otro mundo (Flowers from Another World)	Alfonso		
2000	Plenilunio (Plenilune)	Ferreras		
2002	El alquimista impaciente (The Impatient Alchemist)	Luis Dávila		
2002	Smoking Room	Puig		
2003	El misterio Galíndez (The Galíndez File)			
2007	Concursante (The Contestant)	Edmundo Figueroa		
2007	El niño de barro (The Mud Boy)	Dr. Soria		
2007	Tocar el cielo (Touch the Sky)	Pedro		
2009	Os mortos van á présa	Filomeno		
2012	Todo es silencio (All Is Silence)	Rumbo		

Television

Year	Title	Role	Notes	Ref
2017	El ministerio del tiempo	Marqués de Comillas	Guest. Episode: "Tiempo de esclavos"	
2018	Mira lo que has hecho	Ramón	Recurring. Season 1	

== Accolades ==
Year	Award	Category	Work	Result	Ref.
2002	5th Málaga Film Festival	Silver Biznaga for Best Actor	Smoking Room	Won	
2004	2nd Mestre Mateo Awards	Best Actor	Secuestrados en Xeorxia	Nominated	
2005	3rd Mestre Mateo Awards	Best Supporting Actor	La promesa	Nominated	
2008	6th Mestre Mateo Awards	Best Actor	The Mud Boy	Won	
2008	6th Mestre Mateo Awards	Best Supporting Actor	The Contestant	Nominated	
2009	7th Mestre Mateo Awards	Best Actor	Os mortos van á presa	Won	
