= Julia Gutiérrez Caba =

Spanish actress

The Most Excellent Julia Gutiérrez Caba OAXS
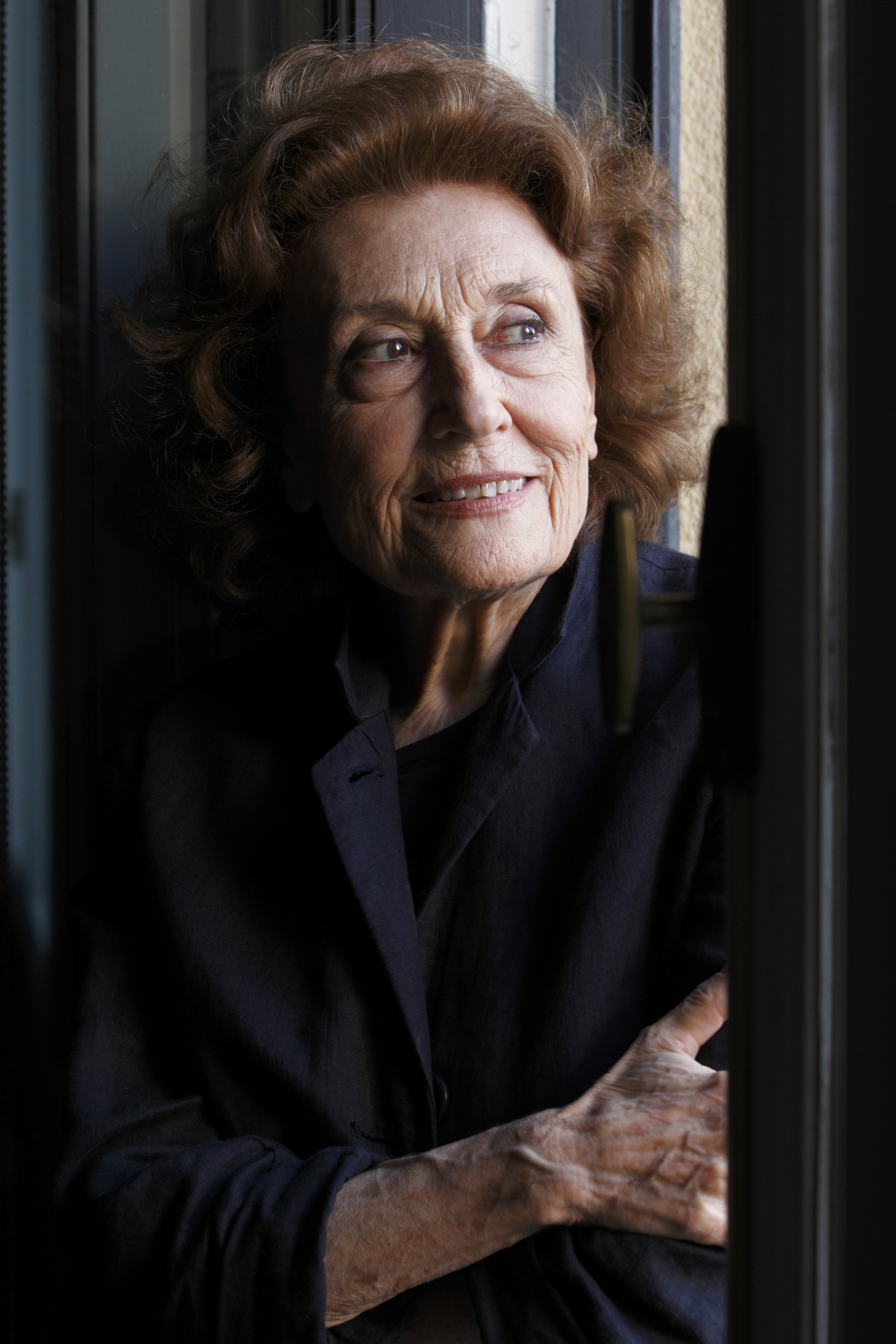
- Born: Julia Gutiérrez Caba; 20 October 1928 (age 97); Madrid, Spain
- Occupation: Actress
- Years active: 1951 – present
- Spouse: Manuel Collado Álvarez (1964–2009)
- Parent(s): Emilio Gutiérrez Esteban; Irene Caba Alba

Julia Gutiérrez Caba OAXS (born on 20 October 1928 in Madrid) is a Spanish theatre and film actress.

== Biography ==
She is the daughter of actors Emilio Gutiérrez Esteban and Irene Caba Alba and sister of the actress Irene Gutiérrez Caba and actor Emilio Gutiérrez Caba.

=== Movie career ===
Caba has not acted in many films, as she preferred stage and television, but is the protagonist of Juan Antonio Bardem's film Nunca pasa nada and appears in the cult classic La gran familia. She is known for her role in TV series Los Serrano. She has won a Goya Awards as Best Supporting Actress for her role in José Luis Garci's You're the one.

== Filmography ==
=== Film ===
Year	Title	Role	Ref.
2011	Los ojos de Julia	Soledad	
2000	You're the One (Una Historia de Entonces)	Aunt Gala	
1997	El color de las nubes	Lola	
1997	La Herida Luminosa	Mother Benedicta	
1982	Sonatas	Cast Member	
1977	Doña Perfecta	Cast Member	
1976	Cazar un Gato Negro	Cast Member	
1976	Fulanita y sus Menganos	Cast Member	
1975	En la Cresta de la Ola	Cast Member	
1974	Un Hombre como los demás	Cast Member	
1973	Experiencia Prematrimonial	Cast Member	
1970	Fortunata y Jacinta	Cast Member	
1969	Las Amigas	Cast Member	
1969	Los Desafíos	Lola, Wife in segment 2	
1966	Operación Plus Ultra	Cast Member	
1966	Un Millon en la Basura	Cast Member	
1966	Las Viudas	Ana	
1965	Currito of the Cross	Cast Member	
1964	Tiempo de Amor	Cast Member	
1963	La frontera de Dios	Cast Member	
1963	Nunca pasa nada	Cast Member	
1962	La gran familia	Cast Member	
1962	Accidente 703	Cast Member	
1961	Diferente	Cast Member	
1947	Viela, Rue Sem Sol	Sweethear	

== Honours ==
- Gold Medal of Merit in Labour (Kingdom of Spain, 1 December 2006).
- Dame Grand Cross of the Civil Order of Alfonso X, the Wise (Kingdom of Spain, 7 October 2016).
