= La herida luminosa =

- Theatrical release poster
- Directed by: José Luis Garci
- Written by: José Luis Garci; Horacio Valcárcel
- Produced by: Enrique Cerezo; José Luis Garci
- Starring: Fernando Guillén; Mercedes Sampietro; Julia Gutiérrez Caba
- Cinematography: Raúl Pérez Cubero
- Edited by: José Luis Garci
- Music by: Manuel Balboa
- Production companies: Nickel Odeon Dos S.A. Enrique Cerezo, P.C.
- Distributed by: United International Pictures
- Release date: 21 March 1997
- Running time: 100 minutes
- Country: Spain
- Language: Spanish

The Wound of Light (Spanish: La herida luminosa) is a 1997 Spanish film directed by José Luis Garci and starring Fernando Guillén, Mercedes Sampietro and Julia Gutiérrez Caba. The plot is based on a novel by Josep Maria de Sagarra. It was previously filmed in 1956 in a production directed by Tulio Demicheli

== Plot ==
Dr. Mills, a renowned cardiologist, and his wife Isabel have had marital problems for a long time. They live accompanied by their two maids in a provincial capital, during the oppressive Spain of the 1950s. Unexpectedly, Dr. Mills falls in love with Julia, a younger colleague. Given the refusal of Isabel to a separation, the doctor resorts to crime, which is made easier by his profession.

== Cast ==
- Fernando Guillén – Doctor Molinos
- Mercedes Sampietro – Doña Isabel
- Julia Gutiérrez Caba – Sister Benedicta
- María Massip – Escolástica
- Beatriz Santana – Julia
- Neus Asensi – Jovita
- Cayetana Guillén Cuervo –Sister María

== DVD release ==
La herida luminosa is available in Region 2 DVD in Spanish with English.
