= Ricardo Franco (director) =

Spanish screenwriter, actor and director

- Born: 24 May 1949; Madrid, Spain
- Died: 20 May 1998 (aged 48); Madrid, Spain
- Occupations: Screenwriter, film director
- Years active: 1969–1998

Ricardo Franco (24 May 1949 in Madrid – 20 May 1998 in Madrid) was a Spanish screenwriter and film director.

== Biography ==
Nephew of Jesús Franco. He died at 49 years old when he filmed Lágrimas negras. He wrote lyrics for pop songs for Tam Tam Go!, "Manuel Raquel" hit for example. "Loco de amor" played Café Quijano was written by Franco too.

== Filmography ==
=== As film director ===
- Gospel, el monstruo (1969).
- El desastre de Annual (1970).
- El increíble aumento de la vida (1974).
- Pascual Duarte (1975).
- Los restos del naufragio (1978).
- Disa, cincuenta aniversario (1983).
- Gringo mojado (1984).
- El sueño de Tánger (1985).
- Berlín Blues (1988).
- La mujer de tu vida (1988) (TV episode).
- Crónicas del mal (1991) (TV).
- La canción del condenado (1991).
- ¡Oh, cielos! (1993).
- Después de tantos años (1994) (documentary)
- La buena estrella (1997).
- Lágrimas negras (1998).

=== As screenwriter ===
- Adiós, pequeña (Imanol Uribe, 1986).
- Berlín Blues (1988).
- Sangre y arena (Javier Elorrieta, 1989).
- Tu nombre envenena mis sueños (Pilar Miró, 1996).
- La buena estrella (1997).
- Lágrimas negras (1998).

=== As actor ===
- Amo tu cama, rica (Emilio Gutiérrez Lázaro, 1970).
- Los restos del naufragio (1977).
- Travelling Companion (1979)
- Pepi, Luci, Bom y otras chicas del montón (Pedro Almodóvar, 1980).
- La madre (Miguel Bardem, 1995).
