= Jordi Mollà =

Catalan actor and artist

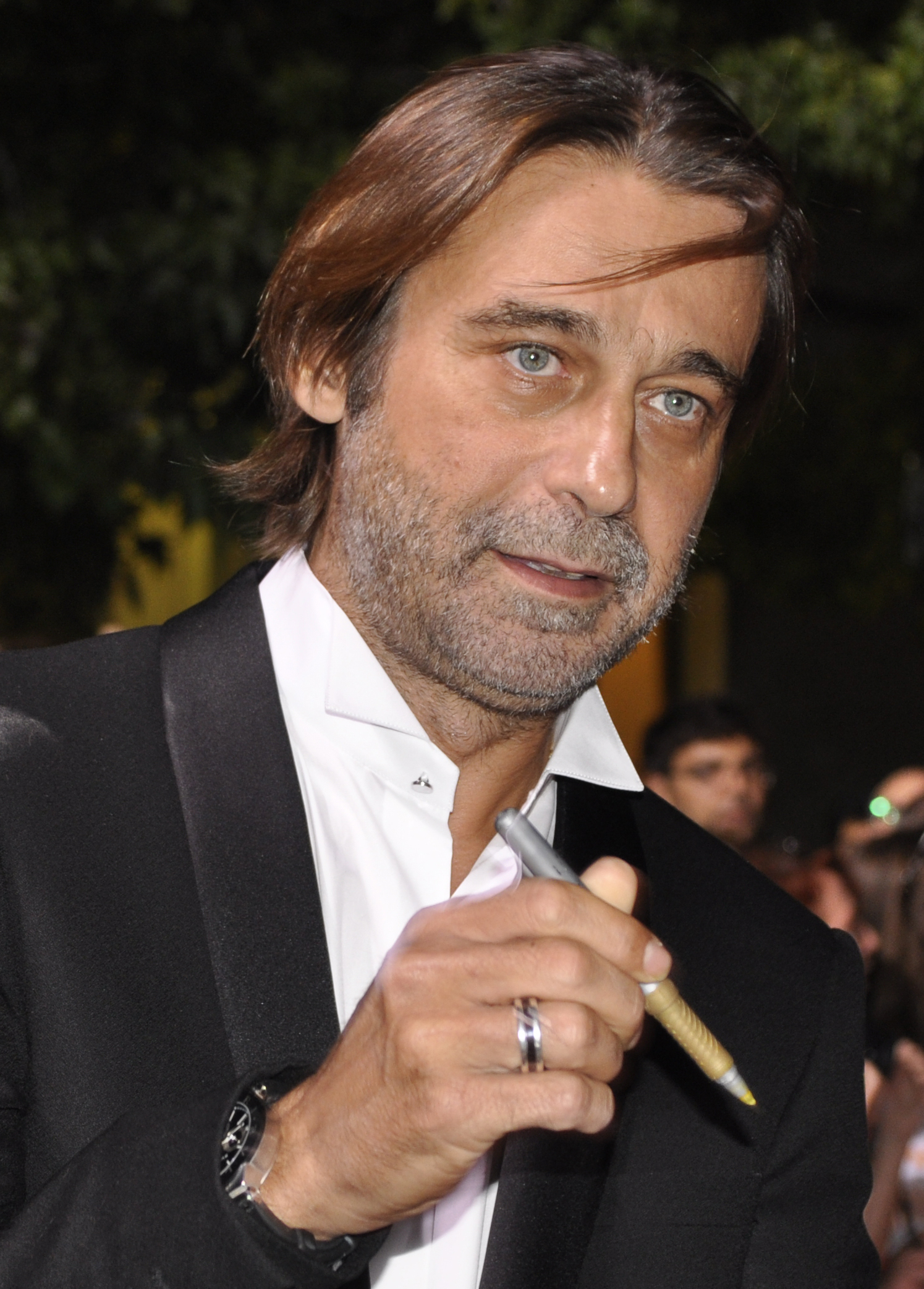
- Mollà in 2016
- Born: Jordi Mollà Perales; 1 July 1968 (age 58); L'Hospitalet de Llobregat, Catalonia, Spain
- Education: Institut del Teatre
- Occupations: Actor; artist; writer; filmmaker
- Years active: 1988–present
- Known for: Jamón jamón, La Celestina The Lucky Star, Second Skin, Blow, El cónsul de Sodoma, Jack Ryan
- Website: www.jordimollaart.com

Jordi Mollà Perales (Catalan pronunciation: [ˈʒɔɾði muˈʎa]) is a Spanish actor, artist, writer, and filmmaker from Catalonia. He has been nominated three times for the Goya Award for Best Actor for The Lucky Star (1997), Second Skin (1999), and El cónsul de Sodoma (2009).

== Early life and education ==
Jordi Mollà y Perales was born and raised in L'Hospitalet de Llobregat, Province of Barcelona. He trained at the Institut del Teatre, and furthered his studies in Italy, Hungary, and England. His mother tongues are Catalan and Spanish, and he is fluent in English, Italian, and French.

== Career ==
=== Acting ===
Mollà breakout role was in Bigas Luna's 1992 comedy drama Jamón, jamón, where he played the jilted lover of Penélope Cruz's character. Mollà went on to star in other acclaimed films in his native country, including Stories from the Kronen and La Celestina. The latter earned him his first Goya Award nomination for Best Supporting Actor. His subsequent starring role in The Lucky Star earned him widespread acclaim, earning him a Premios Ondas, a Butaca Award for Best Catalan Actor, and another Goya nomination, this time for Best Actor. He has since been nominated twice more, for Second Skin and El cónsul de Sodoma.

Mollà made his Hollywood debut in the 2001 biographical crime film Blow, where he played a villainous drug trafficker based on Carlos Lehder. Mollà subsequently played a similar character in Michael Bay's 2003 action sequel Bad Boys II, opposite Will Smith and Martin Lawrence. His co-star Gabrielle Union labeled him as "The Tom Cruise of Spain," when praising his performance as drug lord Johnny Tapia. Mollà then starred in The Tulse Luper Suitcases, an ambitious multi-year, multi-media project created by avant-garde director Peter Greenaway. In 2004, he portrayed Juan Seguin, a Spanish-Tejano political and military figure of the Texas Revolution who helped to establish the independence of Texas in the movie, The Alamo. He has subsequently starred in many high-profile feature films, including Elizabeth: The Golden Age, Knight and Day, Che: Part 2, Colombiana, Riddick, In the Heart of the Sea, and The Man Who Killed Don Quixote. He starred in the second season of Jack Ryan as Venezuelan President Nicolás Reyes.

=== Directing ===
Mollà began directing short films in 1994. His debut, Walter Peralta, earned a Goya nomination for Best Documentary Short. He made his feature directorial debut in 2012 with 88.

=== Art ===
Mollà is a self-taught painter. In the summer of 2002, he exhibited in ARCO Madrid at the Carmen de la Guerra Gallery, along with a number of other artists.

== Filmography ==
=== Actor ===
Film
Year	Title	Role	Notes
1992	Shooting Elizabeth	Desk Clerk	
1992	Jamón, jamón	José Luis	
1993	Historias de la puta mili	El Pulpo	
1993	Mi hermano del alma	Vendedor	
1994	Alegre ma non-troppo	Vicente	
1994	Todo es mentira	Ariel	
1994	Le fusil de bois	Lagrange	
1995	Men Always Lie	Guillermo	
1995	Stories from the Kronen	Roberto	
1995	The Flower of My Secret	Doctor A	
1996	Perdona bonita, pero Lucas me quería a mí	Toni	
1996	La Celestina	Pármeno	Nominated - Goya Award for Best Supporting Actor
1997	La cible	Luigi	
1997	The Lucky Star	Daniel	Premios Ondas for Best Actor; Mar del Plata Festival Award for Best Actor; Butaca Award for Best Catalan Actor; Nominated - Goya Award for Best Actor
1998	The Stolen Years	Tomás	
1998	El pianista	Doria 20 años	Viña del Mar Award for Best Supporting Actor
1999	Volavérunt	Godoy	
1999	Nobody Knows Anybody	Sapo	
1999	Second Skin	Alberto	Nominated - Goya Award for Best Actor
2001	Blow	Diego Delgado	
2001	Sound of the Sea	Ulises	
2002	God Is on Air	Salva	
2003	The Tulse Luper Suitcases, Part 1: The Moab Story	Jan Palmerion	Multimedia film
2003	Bad Boys II	Hector Juan Carlos 'Johnny' Tapia	
2003	The Tulse Luper Suitcases: Antwerp	Jan Palmerion	Multimedia film
2004	The Tulse Luper Suitcases, Part 2: Vaux to the Sea	Jan Palmerion	Multimedia film
2004	The Alamo	Juan Seguín	
2004	The Tulse Luper Suitcases, Part 3: From Sark to the Finish	Hypolite / Gaudí	Multimedia film
2005	Ausentes (The Absent)	Samuel	
2005	A Life in Suitcases	Hypolite / Gaudí / Jan Palmerion	Multimedia film
2005	Anthony: Warrior of God	Antonio	
2006	The Stone Merchant	Alceo	
2006	GAL	Paco Ariza	
2007	Cinemart	Jordi	
2007	Elizabeth: The Golden Age	King Philip II of Spain	
2007	Sultanes del Sur	Leonardo Bátiz	
2008	Che: Part 2	Captain Mario Vargas	
2008	Inconceivable	Victor the Clinical Coordinator	
2008	La Conjura de El Escorial	Mateo Vázquez	
2008	El cónsul de Sodoma	Jaime Gil de Biedma	Nominated - Goya Award for Best Actor; Nominated - Gaudí Award for Best Performance by an Actor in a Leading Role
2009	Ce n'è per tutti	Daniele	
2010	The Making of Plus One	Victor the D.O.P.	
2010	Zenitram	Daniel Durbán	
2010	Knight and Day	Antonio	
2010	Inhale	Aguilar	
2010	Bunraku	Valentine	
2011	There Be Dragons	Don José	
2011	Colombiana	Marco	
2012	A Gun in Each Hand	M.	Miami Grand Jury Prize for Best Ensemble Performance
2013	Riddick	Santana	
2015	Latin Lover	Alfonso	
2015	Ant-Man	Castillo	Scenes deleted
2015	In the Heart of the Sea	Spanish Captain	
2016	Criminal	Xavier Heimdahl	
2016	Sundown	Dorian	
2016	Term life	Viktor	
2016	The Man Who Was Thursday	Charles	
2016	Treintona, Soltera y Fantástica	Óscar	
2016	Quel bravo ragazzo	Colombian Boss	
2016	Prigioniero della mia libertà	Alejandro Torres	
2017	The Music of Silence	Sandro	
2017	Operation Goldenshell	Litarco / Ray Silvela	
2017	Agadah	Jan Potocki / Diego Hervas	
2017	Niente di Serio	Lulù	
2018	Last Prince of Atlantis	Don Vincenzo (voice)	
2018	The Man Who Killed Don Quixote	Alexei Miiskin	
2018	Ibiza	Hernando	
2018	Speed Kills	Jules Bergman	
2021	Niente di Serio	Lulu	Italian film
2021	The Other Me	Vaako	
2021	The Private Lives of Jordi Mollà & Domingo Zapata	Jordi Mollà	
2023	Aggro Dr1ft	BO	
2023	Pet Shop Days	Castro	
2025	The Life List	Johnny	
2025	Hunting Season	Alejandro	
2026	Fortitude †	Juan Pujol García	Post-production

Television
Year	Title	Role	Notes
1987	El viatge	Alacots	Episode: "Descansar"
1989–1991	La Granja, menjars casolans	Ramonet	Main cast
1991	Un dels últims vespres de carnaval	Rafello	Television film
1991	Dark Justice	Raul	Episode: "Broken Toys"
1992	Dark Justice	Villain	Episode: "Judgment Night"
1992	Revolver	Jordi Torres	Television film
1993	The Young Picasso: 1881–1906	Ángel F. Soto	Miniseries; 3 episodes
1993	All in the Game	Hotel Receptionist	Miniseries; Main cast
1994	Arnau	Tamim	Miniseries; Main cast
1998	Dollar for the Dead	Federale Captain	Television film
2007	Caravaggio	Cardinal Del Monte	Television film
2008	Stevie	Adrián	Television film
2011	CSI: Miami	Hector Romero	Episode: "Stiff"
2012	China, IL	Dream Reamer (voice)	Episode: "The Dream Reamer"
2015	Long Live the Royals	King Diego Belafonte (voice)	Miniseries; Episode: "Snore Much"
2018	Genius	Dr. Salvador Ruiz	2 episodes
2018	Queen of the South	Rocco de la Peña	3 episodes
2019	Jack Ryan	Nicolás Reyes	Main cast (season 2)
2025	MobLand	Jaime Lopez	2 episodes
2026	Day One	TBA	Main Cast

=== Filmmaking ===
Year	Title	Director	Writer	Notes
1993	Walter Peralta	Yes	Yes	Short film Nominated - Goya Award for Best Documentary Short Film
1995	No me importaría irme contigo	Yes	Yes	Short film
2002	No somos nadie	Yes	Yes	
2007	Cinemart	Yes	Yes	
2008	Inconceivable	No	Yes	
2012	88	Yes	Yes	Nominated - Grand Prix Asturias
