= Ignacio Martínez de Pisón =

Spanish writer (born 1960)

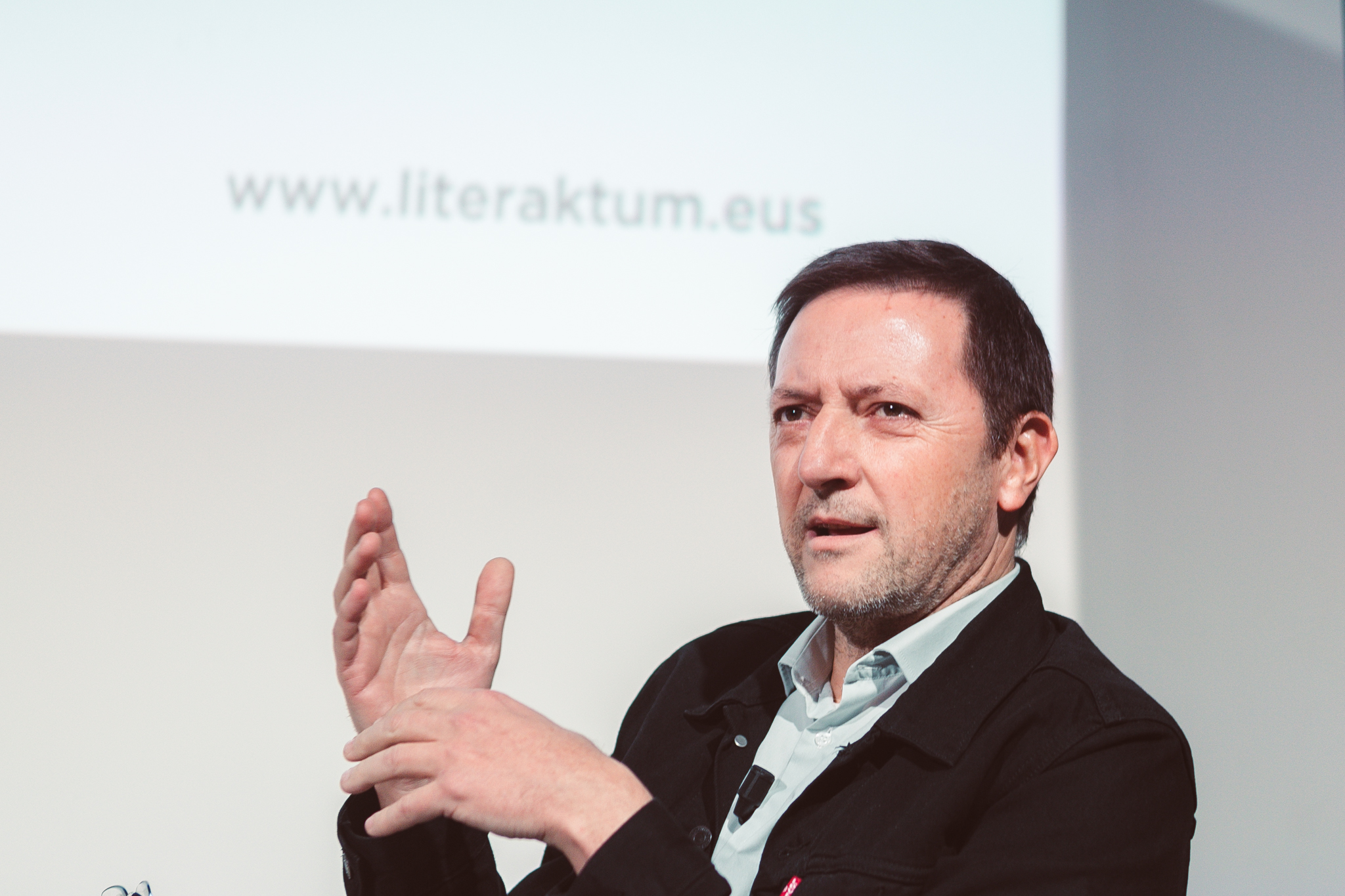
Ignacio Martínez de Pisón at Literaktum

Ignacio Martínez de Pisón (born in Zaragoza in 1960) is a Spanish writer. He is the author of more than a dozen books, among which the most notable are:

- El día de mañana (2011; Premio de la Crítica, Premio Ciutat de Barcelona, Premio de las Letras Aragonesas, Premio Hislibris),
- La buena reputación (2014; Premio Nacional de Narrativa, Premio Cálamo al Libro del Año)

His novel Enterrar a los muertos has been translated into English by Anne McLean.

== Selected works ==
- Aeropuerto de Funchal
- Carreteras secundarias
- Dientes de leche
- Derecho natural
- El día de mañana
- El fin de los buenos tiempos
- El tiempo de las mujeres
- Enterrar a los muertos
- Filek
- La buena reputación
- La ternura del dragón
- María bonita
