= The Chambermaid on the Titanic =

- Theatrical release poster
- Directed by: Bigas Luna
- Written by: Bigas Luna; Cuca Canals; Jean-Louis Benoit
- Based on: La Femme de chambre du Titanic by Didier Decoin
- Produced by: Yves Marmion; Daniel Toscan du Plantier
- Starring: Romane Bohringer; Oliver Martinez; Aitana Sánchez-Gijón; Didier Bezace; Aldo Maccione
- Cinematography: Patrick Blossier
- Edited by: Kenout Peltier
- Music by: Alberto Iglesias
- Production companies: UGC YM; La Sept Cinéma; France 2 Cinéma; Rodeo Drive; Mate Producciones S.A. Tornasol Films; Westdeutscher Rundfunk; Eurimages; Canal+ Soficas; Sofinergie 4 Sofineurope; Centre National de la Cinématographie
- Distributed by: UGC-Fox Distribution (France); Alta Films (Spain); Medusa Distribuzione (Italy)
- Release date: October 24, 1997 (Spain)
- Running time: 96 minutes
- Countries: France; Spain; Italy
- Languages: French; Spanish; Italian

The Chambermaid on the Titanic (Spanish: La camarera del Titanic, French: La Femme de chambre du Titanic, Italian: L'immagine del desiderio) is a 1997 drama film co-written and directed by Bigas Luna, and starring Oliver Martinez, Romane Bohringer and Aitana Sánchez-Gijón. It is based on the 1991 novel La Femme de chambre du Titanic by Didier Decoin. The film is known variously by its French title, La Femme de chambre du Titanic, and also by the shortened English title The Chambermaid, which was adopted in late August 1998 to avoid the impression that it was trying to cash in on the success of James Cameron's popular film, Titanic, which was released the year before The Chambermaid on the Titanic made its US debut.

== Plot ==
In 1912, the protagonist, Horty, leads an uneventful life as a foundry worker in the Lorraine region of northern France with his wife, Zoe, "the most beautiful woman in town." The owner of the foundry where Horty works, Simeon, lusts after Zoe. When Horty wins a company athletic contest, Simeon's prize is a ticket to Southampton to see the sailing of the RMS Titanic.

The night before the Titanic departs, Horty meets a beautiful young woman named Marie, who explains that she is a chambermaid aboard the Titanic. Marie has nowhere to sleep because all of the local hotels are full, and Horty agrees to share his room. Their encounter is seemingly chaste, with Marie sleeping in the bed while Horty spends the night in the armchair. However, in the middle of the night, Marie tries to seduce him. Whether or not she succeeds is ambiguous, and she is gone when Horty awakes. Attending the departure of the Titanic, Horty spots a photographer taking a picture of Marie, and asks the photographer for the photo.

Upon returning home, Horty finds that he has been promoted, but this good news is dampened by rumors of an affair between his wife, Zoe, and the foundry owner, Simeon. A bitter and jealous Horty visits a local bar to drown his sorrows. Drunk, he tells friends and co-workers about the lovely chambermaid he met in Southampton, earning him free drinks and tips. Following the sinking of the Titanic, Horty's tales become increasingly erotic, and the viewer is never sure what is truth and what is fantasy.

Horty catches the attention of a traveling entertainer named Zeppe. Zeppe offers Horty the chance to escape his dismal, dreary life. Horty agrees and begins to work with Zeppe, converting his story into a play. One night, Zoe attends the play; later, Horty explains his tale as a work of fiction. However, Horty's story becomes more elaborate and romantic attracting a larger audience for each re-telling, steadily driving a wedge between him and his wife. Eventually, Zoe joins in the performance, playing the role of Marie poignantly fighting against the waves after the Titanic sinks. During the performance, Horty recognises Marie in the audience and leaves the stage mid-performance to follow her when she walks out. Marie's husband catches him outside and explains that Marie is not her real name, as she is just a petty thief who did not find money in his bedroom the night he shared a room with her. Zoe, who followed her husband, sees Marie who informs Zoe that she only came to tonight's show to get the monies she believes she is owed.

== Cast ==
- Olivier Martinez as Horty
- Aitana Sánchez-Gijón as Marie
- Romane Bohringer as Zoé
- Aldo Maccione as Zeppe
- Didier Bezace as Siméon
- Jean-Marie Juan as Pascal
- Arno Chevrier as Al
- Salvador Madrid as Léon
- Marianne Groves as Mathilde
- Didier Bénureau as Siméon's secretary
- Alberto Cassadie as Giovanni
- Giorgio Gobbi as Manu
- Yves Verhoeven as Gaspard
- Vincenzo De Caro as Lacroix
- Stefania Orsola Garello as Mimi
- Barbara Lerici as Blanche

== Reception ==
The Chambermaid on the Titanic received an 81% fresh rating on Rotten Tomatoes based on 16 reviews. Mick LaSelle of the San Francisco Chronicle praised Chambermaid for what he felt was a rare honest portrayal of male sexuality. He also called it "a tribute to longing itself" saying that that made it "unique." Bill Gallo of the Dallas Observer called it "beautiful, complex [and] occasionally overwrought" and "a rich meditation on the uses of imagination and the power of desire". Stephen Holden of The New York Times felt that the film "never finds a visual vocabulary to match the elegance of its ideas". Richard von Busack of Metro Silicon Valley criticised some of the casting, finding Aitana Sánchez-Gijón as Marie too obvious a temptress and never quite believing that Romane Bohringer as Zoe could have been unfaithful. However, he compared Chambermaid favourably to James Cameron's film Titanic, saying The Chambermaid on the Titanic "is a smarter and far more elegant film" and that "it gets into the heart of the matter. The central question is not why did the great ship go down? but why do we love to tell stories about it?" Peter Keough of The Phoenix said, "[Chambermaid's] treatment of the same themes of love, catastrophe, and the redeeming power of fantasy is a lot more subtle and satisfying." Jeff Vice of the Deseret News felt that the ending was "contrived" and that many of the cast seem "unsure of [their] motivations". He also felt that "the set pieces are bound to pale in comparison to those in [Cameron's film] Titanic."

== Awards ==
- Goya Award for Best Adapted Screenplay 1997
- Goya Award for Costume Design, 1997
- Golden Pyramid 1997, Bigas Luna
- Best Director 1997, Cairo International Film Festival, Bigas Luna
- Spanish Film Writers Circle Award for Best Screenplay, adapted, 1997, Bigas Luna, Cuca Canals
