= Fernando Ramallo =

Spanish actor (born 1980)

- Born: 3 April 1980 (age 44); Madrid, Spain
- Occupation: Actor

Fernando Ramallo (born 3 April 1980 in Madrid) is a Spanish actor.

== Roles ==
=== Films ===
- Donne-moi la main (Give Me Your Hand) (2008)
- Ejecutores (2008)
- El corazón de la tierra (2007)
- WC (2005)
- Mola ser malo (2005)
- Donde nadie nos ve (2005)
- Condon Express (2005)
- A+ (Amas) (2004)
- Seres queridos (2003)
- El despropósito (2004)
- Entre abril y julio (2002)
- El lado oscuro (2002)
- Algunas chicas doblan las piernas cuando hablan (2001)
- Año cero (2001)
- Nico and Dani (Krámpack) (2000)
- El corazón del guerrero (2000)
- La cartera (2000)
- Cero en conciencia (2000)
- La mujer más fea del mundo (1999)
- Paréntesis (1999) (corto)
- Discotheque (1999)
- El nacimiento de un imperio (1998)
- Carreteras secundarias (Backroads) (1997)
- La buena vida (1996)

=== Television ===
- London Street
- La boda,
- Love story,
- Moder no hay más que guan,
- Yo zoy ingléz
- A las once en casa
- A flor de piel,
- Ellas son así
- Ahora o nunca,
- Catering de amor,
- Cocinando con su enemigo
- Cosas de mujer,
- Crisis, ¡qué crisis!
- No hay más preguntas
- Aquí no hay quien viva
- Érase un premio
- Diez en Ibiza
