= Secrets of the Heart (film) =

- Directed by: Montxo Armendáriz
- Written by: Montxo Armendáriz
- Produced by: Imanol Uribe and Andrés Santana
- Starring: Carmelo Gómez; Charo López; Sílvia Munt; Vicky Peña; Andoni Erburu; Álvaro Nagore; Chete Lera
- Music by: Bingen Mendizábal
- Distributed by: Aiete Films; Ariane Films
- Release date: 14 March 1997
- Running time: 105 minutes
- Country: Spain
- Language: Spanish

Secrets of the Heart (Spanish: Secretos del corazón) is a 1997 Spanish film. The film was a box office hit in Spain, grossing ESP 711,092,434. It was nominated for the Academy Award for Best Foreign Language Film at the 70th Academy Awards.

== Synopsis ==
In 1960s Spain, 9-year-old Javi and his friend Carlos are both fascinated and scared by an empty house in their village. Javi's older brother insists a crime was once committed there, and eerie voices are sometimes heard.

The mystery captivates Javi, especially as it seems linked to his father's death, who used to meet a mysterious woman there. Returning to their secluded mountain home, Javi finds another locked room, shrouded in secrecy. As he investigates, he uncovers adult secrets and lies.

== Cast ==
- Carmelo Gómez as Tío
- Charo López as María
- Sílvia Munt as Madre
- Vicky Peña as Rosa
- Andoni Erburu as Javi
- Álvaro Nagore as Juan Zabalza
- Íñigo Garcés as Carlos
- Joan Vallès as Abuelo
- Joan Dalmau as Benito
- Chete Lera as Ricardo
- Manolo Monje as Don Bautista
- José María Asín as Don Alejandro
- Carlos Salaberri as Bedel

== Commentaries ==
According to the film's producer, Secretos del corazón is "a poetical and emotional movie that can share with Hollywood's big overproductions' special effects."

Armendáriz has had a brief film career and appears in such works as "Historias del Kronen", "Tasio" and "Las cartas de Alou".

== Awards and nominations ==
=== Goya Awards ===
Year	Category	Award	Recipient(s)	Result
1998	Best Film (Mejor Película)	Goya	Secretos del corazón	Nominated
1998	Best Director (Mejor Director)	Goya	Montxo Armendáriz	Nominated
1998	Best Supporting Actress (Mejor Actriz de Reparto)	Goya	Vicky Peña	Nominated
1998	Best Supporting Actress (Mejor Actriz de Reparto)	Goya	Charo López	Won
1998	Best New Actor (Mejor actor revelación)	Goya	Andoni Erburu	Won
1998	Best Production Design (Mejor Dirección Artística)	Goya	Félix Murcia	Won
1998	Best Sound (Mejor Sonido)	Goya	Gilles Ortion, Alfonso Pino and Bela María da Costa	Won
1998	Best Editing (Mejor Montaje)	Goya	Rosa Sáinz de Rozas	Nominated
1998	Best Screenplay – Original (Mejor Guión Original)	Goya	Montxo Armendáriz	Nominated

=== Cartagena Film Festival ===
Year	Category	Award	Recipient(s)	Result
1998	Best Film (Mejor Película)	Golden India Catalina	Secretos del corazón	Nominated
1998	Best Director (Mejor Director)	Golden India Catalina	Montxo Armendáriz	Won
1998	Best Supporting Actress (Mejor Actriz de Reparto)	Golden India Catalina	Charo López	Won
1998	Best Cinematography (Mejor Fotografia)	Golden India Catalina	Javier Aguirresarobe	Won

=== Berlin International Film Festival ===
Year	Category	Award	Recipient(s)	Result
1997	Best European Film	Blue Angel	Secretos del corazón	Won
1997	Golden Berlin Bear	Golden Berlin Bear	Montxo Armendáriz	Nominated

=== Academy Awards ===
Year	Category	Award	Recipient(s)	Result
1998	Best Foreign Language Film	Oscar	Secretos del corazón – Spain	Nominated

=== Sant Jordi Awards ===
Year	Category	Award	Recipient(s)	Result
1997	Best Film (Mejor Película Española)	Sant Jordi Award	Secretos del corazón	Won

=== Ondas Awards ===
Year	Category	Award	Recipient(s)	Result
1997	Best Film (Mejor Película)	Film Award	Secretos del corazón	Won

=== Chicago International Film Festival ===
Year	Category	Award	Recipient(s)	Result
1997	Audience Choice Award	Audience Choice Award	Secretos del corazón	Won

=== Spanish Actors Union ===
Year	Category	Recipient(s)	Award	Result
1998	Film: Supporting Performance (Secundario Cine)	Award of the Spanish Actors Union	Charo López	Won
1998	Best New Actor (Mejor Actor Revelación)	Andoni Erburu	Newcomer Award	Won

=== Cinema Writers Circle Awards ===
Year	Category	Award	Recipient(s)	Result
1998	Best Film (Mejor Película)	CEC Award	Secretos del corazón	Won
1998	Best Director (Mejor Director)	CEC Award	Montxo Armendáriz	Won
1998	Best Screenplay, Original (Mejor Guión Original)	CEC Award	Montxo Armendáriz	Won

== See also ==
- List of submissions to the 70th Academy Awards for Best Foreign Language Film
- List of Spanish submissions for the Academy Award for Best Foreign Language Film
