= List of Academy Award winners and nominees from Spain =

This is a list of Spanish Academy Award winners and nominees. This list details the performances of filmmakers, actors, actresses and films that have either been submitted, nominated or have won an Academy Award. The people included are either from Spain or of Spanish descent.

== Acting categories ==
=== Actor in a Leading Role ===
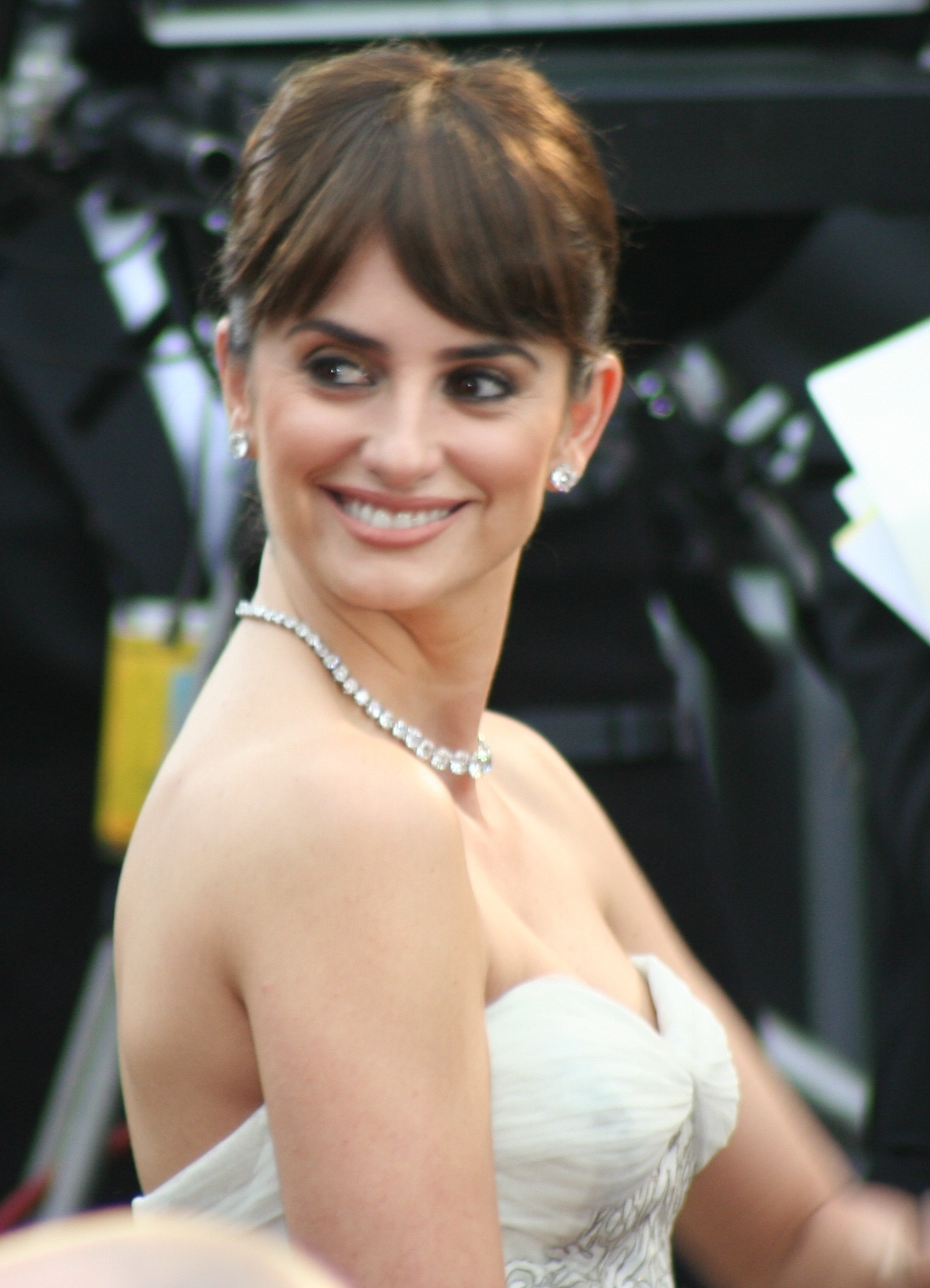
Penélope Cruz at the 81st Academy Awards in 2009

Actor
Year	Name	Film	Status	Milestone / Notes
2000	Javier Bardem	Before Night Falls	Nominated	First Spanish actor to be nominated.
2010	Javier Bardem	Biutiful	Nominated	First Spanish actor to be nominated twice in a leading category.
2019	Antonio Banderas	Pain and Glory (Dolor y gloria)	Nominated	
2021	Javier Bardem	Being the Ricardos	Nominated	

=== Actor in a Supporting Role ===
Supporting Actor
Year	Name	Film	Status	Milestone / Notes
2000	Benicio del Toro	Traffic	Won	Del Toro is a Puerto Rican-born actor with Spanish citizenship since 2011.
2003	Benicio del Toro	21 Grams	Nominated	
2007	Javier Bardem	No Country for Old Men	Won	First Spanish-born actor to win an Academy Award for acting (male or female). First Spanish-born actor to be nominated twice for acting (male or female).
2025	Benicio del Toro	One Battle After Another	Nominated	

=== Actress in a Leading Role ===
Actress
Year	Name	Film	Status	Milestone / Notes
2006	Penélope Cruz	Volver	Nominated	First Spanish male or female actor to be nominated for a Spanish-produced film.
2021	Penélope Cruz	Parallel Mothers (Madres paralelas)	Nominated	
2022	Ana de Armas	Blonde	Nominated	De Armas is a Cuban-born actress with Spanish citizenship.
2024	Karla Sofía Gascón	Emilia Pérez	Nominated	Gascón is the first openly transgender actress to be nominated for Best Actress.

=== Actress in a Supporting Role ===
Supporting Actress
Year	Name	Film	Status	Milestone / Notes
2008	Penélope Cruz	Vicky Cristina Barcelona	Won	First Spanish female actor to win.
2009	Penélope Cruz	Nine	Nominated	First Spanish-born actor to be nominated twice in the same category.

== Animated Feature ==
Animated Feature
Year	Name	Film	Status	Milestone / Notes
2011	Fernando Trueba; Javier Mariscal	Chico & Rita	Nominated	
2019	Sergio Pablos; Marisa Román	Klaus	Nominated	Shared with Jinko Gotoh.
2023	Pablo Berger; Ibon Cormenzana; Ignasi Estapé; Sandra Tapia Díaz	Robot Dreams	Nominated	

== Cinematography ==
Cinematography
Year	Name	Film	Status	Milestone / Notes
1978	Néstor Almendros	Days of Heaven	Won	
1979	Néstor Almendros	Kramer vs. Kramer	Nominated	
1980	Néstor Almendros	The Blue Lagoon	Nominated	
1982	Néstor Almendros	Sophie's Choice	Nominated	

== Costume Design ==
Costume Design
Year	Name	Film	Status	Milestone / Notes
1952	Antoni Clavé	Hans Christian Andersen	Nominated	Nominated for Best Costume Design – Color. Shared with Mary Wills and Barbara Karinska.
1971	Yvonne Blake; Antonio Castillo	Nicholas and Alexandra	Won	Blake is a British-born Spanish costume designer.
1975	Yvonne Blake	The Four Musketeers	Nominated	Shared with Ron Talsky.
2012	Paco Delgado	Les Misérables	Nominated	
2015	Paco Delgado	The Danish Girl	Nominated	

== Director ==
Director
Year	Name	Film	Status	Milestone / Notes
2002	Pedro Almodóvar	Talk to Her (Hable con ella)	Nominated	

== Documentary Feature ==
Documentary Feature
Year	Name	Film	Status	Milestone / Notes
2003	Carles Bosch; Josep Maria Domènech	Balseros	Nominated	

== International Feature Film ==
This list focuses on Spanish films that won or were nominated for the Best International Feature Film.

International Feature Film
Year	Film	Director	Status	Milestone / Notes
1958	Vengeance (La venganza)	Juan Antonio Bardem	Nominated	First Spanish language film to be nominated.
1961	Plácido	Luis García Berlanga	Nominated	
1963	Los Tarantos	Francisco Rovira Beleta	Nominated	
1967	El amor brujo	Francisco Rovira Beleta	Nominated	
1970	Tristana	Luis Buñuel	Nominated	
1972	My Dearest Señorita (Mi querida señorita)	Jaime de Armiñán	Nominated	
1977	That Obscure Object of Desire (Ese oscuro objeto del deseo)	Luis Buñuel	Nominated	
1979	Mama Turns a Hundred (Mamá cumple cien años)	Carlos Saura	Nominated	
1980	The Nest (El nido)	Jaime de Armiñán	Nominated	
1983	Begin the Beguine (Volver a empezar)	José Luis Garci	Won	First Spanish language film to win.
1984	Carmen	Carlos Saura	Nominated	
1985	Double Feature (Sesión continua)	José Luis Garci	Nominated	
1987	Course Completed (Asignatura aprobada)	José Luis Garci	Nominated	
1988	Women on the Verge of a Nervous Breakdown (Mujeres al borde de un ataque de nervios)	Pedro Almodóvar	Nominated	
1993	Belle Époque	Fernando Trueba	Won	
1997	Secrets of the Heart (Secretos del corazón)	Montxo Armendáriz	Nominated	
1998	The Grandfather (El abuelo)	José Luis Garci	Nominated	
1999	All About My Mother (Todo sobre mi madre)	Pedro Almodóvar	Won	
2004	The Sea Inside (Mar adentro)	Alejandro Amenábar	Won	
2019	Pain and Glory (Dolor y gloria)	Pedro Almodóvar	Nominated	
2023	Society of the Snow (La sociedad de la nieve)	J. A. Bayona	Nominated	
2025	Sirāt	Óliver Laxe	Nominated	

== Makeup & Hairstyling ==
Makeup & Hairstyling
Year	Name	Film	Status	Milestone / Notes
2004	Manolo García	The Sea Inside (Mar adentro)	Nominated	Shared with Jo Allen. First Spanish-produced film to be nominated for a craft/technical category.
2006	David Martí; Montse Ribé	Pan's Labyrinth (El laberinto del fauno)	Won	
2020	Sergio López-Rivera	Ma Rainey's Black Bottom	Won	Shared with Mia Neal and Jamika Wilson.
2023	Ana López-Puigcerver; David Martí; Montse Ribé	Society of the Snow	Nominated	

== Music categories ==
=== Original Score ===
Original Score
Year	Name	Film	Status	Milestone / Notes
2005	Alberto Iglesias	The Constant Gardener	Nominated	
2006	Javier Navarrete	Pan's Labyrinth (El laberinto del fauno)	Nominated	
2007	Alberto Iglesias	The Kite Runner	Nominated	
2011	Alberto Iglesias	Tinker Tailor Soldier Spy	Nominated	
2021	Alberto Iglesias	Parallel Mothers (Madres paralelas)	Nominated	

== Production Design ==
Production Design
Year	Name	Film	Status	Milestone / Notes
1952	Antoni Clavé	Hans Christian Andersen	Nominated	Shared with Richard Day and Howard Bristol.
1970	Gil Parrondo; Antonio Mateos	Patton	Won	Shared with Urie McCleary and Pierre-Louis Thevenet.
1971	Gil Parrondo	Nicholas and Alexandra	Won	Shared with John Box, Ernest Archer, Jack Maxsted, and Vernon Dixon.
1972	Gil Parrondo	Travels with My Aunt	Nominated	Shared with John Box and Robert W. Laing.
2006	Pilar Revuelta	Pan's Labyrinth (El laberinto del fauno)	Won	Shared with Eugenio Caballero.

== Short-film categories ==
=== Animated Short Film ===
Animated Short Film
Year	Name	Film	Status	Milestone / Notes
2009	Javier Recio	The Lady and the Reaper (La dama y la Muerte)	Nominated	
2018	Nuria González Blanco	Late Afternoon	Nominated	Shared with Louise Bagnall.
2021	Alberto Mielgo; Leo Sánchez	The Windshield Wiper	Won	

=== Live Action Short Film ===
Live Action Short Film
Year	Name	Film	Status	Milestone / Notes
1996	Juan Carlos Fresnadillo	Esposados	Nominated	
2004	Nacho Vigalondo	7:35 in the Morning (7:35 de la mañana)	Nominated	
2006	Javier Fesser	Binta and the Great Idea (Binta y la gran idea)	Nominated	
2006	Borja Cobeaga	One Too Many (Éramos pocos)	Nominated	
2013	Esteban Crespo	That Wasn't Me (Aquél no era yo)	Nominated	
2016	Juanjo Giménez	Timecode	Nominated	
2018	Rodrigo Sorogoyen; María del Puy Alvarado	Mother (Madre)	Nominated	

== Sound ==
Academy Award for Best Sound
Year	Name	Film	Status	Milestone / Notes
2025	Amanda Villavieja; Laia Casanovas; Yasmina Praderas	Sirāt	Nominated	First all-female team to be nominated in the category.

== Visual Effects ==
Academy Award for Best Visual Effects
Year	Name	Film	Status	Milestone / Notes
2020	Santiago Colomo Martínez	The One and Only Ivan	Nominated	Shared with Nick Davis, Greg Fisher & Ben Jones. First Spanish animator to be nominated for Best Visual Effects.

== Writing categories ==
=== Original Screenplay ===
Original
Year	Name	Film	Status	Milestone / Notes
1967	Jorge Semprún	The War Is Over (La Guerre est finie)	Nominated	
1972	Luis Buñuel	The Discreet Charm of the Bourgeoisie (Le Charme discret de la bourgeoisie)	Nominated	Shared with Jean-Claude Carrière.
2002	Pedro Almodóvar	Talk to Her (Hable con ella)	Won	First Spanish-language screenplay to win.

=== Adapted Screenplay ===
Adapted
Year	Name	Film	Status	Milestone / Notes
1969	Jorge Semprún	Z	Nominated	Shared with Costa-Gavras.
1977	Luis Buñuel	That Obscure Object of Desire (Ese oscuro objeto del deseo)	Nominated	Shared with Jean-Claude Carrière.

== Nominations and winners ==
No. of wins	No. of nominations
15	76

== See also ==
- Cinema of Spain
- List of Spanish films
