= List of Spanish submissions for the Academy Award for Best International Feature Film =

Best International Feature Film submissions from Spain

Highlights
- Debut: 1956
- Submissions: 69
- Nominations: 22
- Oscar winners: 4

Spain has submitted films for the Academy Award for Best International Feature Film (Note: The category was previously named the Academy Award for Best Foreign Language Film, but this was changed to the Academy Award for Best International Feature Film in April 2019, after the Academy deemed the word "Foreign" to be outdated.) since the conception of the award. The award is handed out annually by the United States Academy of Motion Picture Arts and Sciences to a feature-length motion picture produced outside the United States that contains primarily non-English dialogue. The award was created for the 1956 Academy Awards, succeeding the non-competitive Honorary Academy Awards which were presented between 1947 and 1955 to the best foreign language films released in the United States.

As of 2026, Spain has been nominated twenty-two times, winning in four occasions, for Begin the Beguine (1982), Belle Époque (1993), All About My Mother (1999), and The Sea Inside (2004).

== Submissions ==
The Academy of Motion Picture Arts and Sciences has invited the film industries of various countries to submit their best film for the Academy Award for Best International Feature Film since 1956. The International Feature Film Committee oversees the process and reviews all the submitted films. Following this, they vote via secret ballot to determine the five nominees for the award. Before the award was created, the Board of Governors of the academy voted on a film every year that was considered the best foreign language film released in the United States, and there were no submissions.

Since the 1980s, the Spanish submission has been decided annually by the Academia de las Artes y las Ciencias Cinematográficas de España (known in English as the Spanish Academy of Arts and Cinematographic Sciences or AACCE). Beginning in 2001, the academy has announced a three-film shortlist before announcing the winning Spanish film.

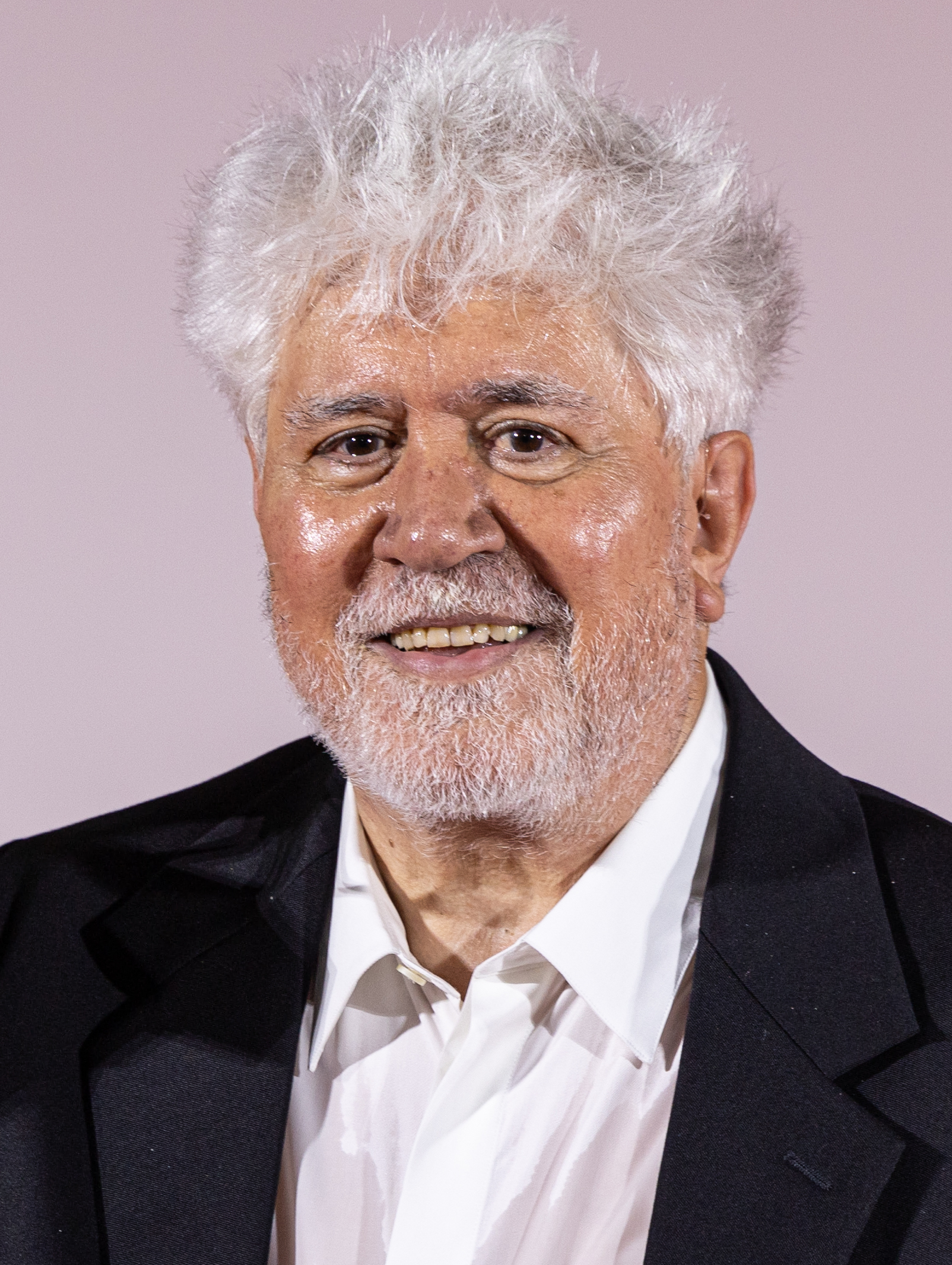
Pedro Almodóvar is the most submitted Spanish filmmaker, winning once for All About My Mother (1999).

Among all countries that have submitted films for the award, Spain ranks third in terms of films that have won the award, behind Italy (ten awards) and France (nine awards) and tied with Japan (four awards), and third in terms of nominees, behind France (thirty-four nominations) and Italy (twenty-seven nominations).

Pedro Almodóvar is the most submitted filmmaker, with seven films selected and one win. Although some of his acclaimed films were controversially snubbed by the Spanish selection committee, they went to win or be nominated in other categories, including: Talk to Her (2002), which won Best Original Screenplay, and Parallel Mothers (2021), which was nominated for Best Actress and Best Original Score.

The country won four times, for: Begin the Beguine (1982), Belle Époque (1993), All About My Mother (1999), and The Sea Inside (2004).

Nominated films include: La Venganza (1958), Plácido (1961), Los Tarantos (1963), Bewitched Love (1967), Tristana (1970), My Dearest Senorita (1972), That Obscure Object of Desire (1977), Mama Turns a Hundred (1979), The Nest (1980), Carmen (1983), Double Feature (1984), Course Completed (1987), Women on the Verge of a Nervous Breakdown (1988), Secrets of the Heart (1997), The Grandfather (1998), Pain and Glory (2019), Society of the Snow (2023), and Sirāt (2025).

Volver (2006), Even the Rain (2010), and The Good Boss (2021), advanced to the December shortlists, but were not nominated.

All submissions were primarily in Spanish, with the exception of That Obscure Object of Desire (1977), mainly in French, while Black Bread (2010), Catalan), Flowers (2014), Summer 1993 (2017), and Alcarràs (2022), were mostly in Catalan.

Below is a list of the films that have been submitted by Spain for review by the academy for the award since its first entry in 1959.

Year (Ceremony)	Film title used in nomination	Original title	Director(s)	Result
1956 (29th)	Afternoon of the Bulls	Tarde de toros	Ladislao Vajda	Not nominated
1957 (30th)	High Street	Calle Mayor	Juan Antonio Bardem	Not nominated
1958 (31st)	La Venganza		Juan Antonio Bardem	Nominated
1960 (33rd)	At Five O'Clock in the Afternoon	A las cinco de la tarde	Juan Antonio Bardem	Not nominated
1961 (34th)	Plácido		Luis García Berlanga	Nominated
1962 (35th)	Dulcinea		Vicente Escrivá	Not nominated
1963 (36th)	Los Tarantos		Francisco Rovira Beleta	Nominated
1964 (37th)	The Girl in Mourning	La niña de luto	Manuel Summers	Not nominated
1965 (38th)	La Tía Tula		Miguel Picazo	Not nominated
1967 (40th)	El amor brujo		Francisco Rovira Beleta	Nominated
1968 (41st)	Spain Again	España otra vez	Jaime Camino	Not nominated
1969 (42nd)	La Celestina		César Fernández Ardavín	Not nominated
1970 (43rd)	Tristana		Luis Buñuel	Nominated
1971 (44th)	Marta		José Antonio Nieves Conde	Not nominated
1972 (45th)	My Dearest Senorita	Mi querida señorita	Jaime de Armiñán	Nominated
1973 (46th)	Habla, mudita		Manuel Gutiérrez Aragón	Not nominated
1974 (47th)	La prima Angélica		Carlos Saura	Not nominated
1975 (48th)	Poachers	Furtivos	José Luis Borau	Not nominated
1976 (49th)	Raise Ravens	Cría cuervos	Carlos Saura	Not nominated
1977 (50th)	That Obscure Object of Desire	Cet obscur objet du désir / Ese oscuro objeto del deseo	Luis Buñuel	Nominated
1978 (51st)	Somnambulists	Sonámbulos	Manuel Gutiérrez Aragón	Not nominated
1979 (52nd)	Mama Turns a Hundred	Mamá cumple cien años	Carlos Saura	Nominated
1980 (53rd)	The Nest	El nido	Jaime de Armiñán	Nominated
1981 (54th)	Patrimonio nacional		Luis García Berlanga	Not nominated
1982 (55th)	Begin the Beguine	Volver a empezar	José Luis Garci	Won Academy Award
1983 (56th)	Carmen		Carlos Saura	Nominated
1984 (57th)	Double Feature	Sesión continua	José Luis Garci	Nominated
1985 (58th)	The Witching Hour	La hora bruja	Jaime de Armiñán	Not nominated
1986 (59th)	Half of Heaven	La mitad del cielo	Manuel Gutiérrez Aragón	Not nominated
1987 (60th)	Course Completed	Asignatura aprobada	José Luis Garci	Nominated
1988 (61st)	Women on the Verge of a Nervous Breakdown	Mujeres al borde de un ataque de nervios	Pedro Almodóvar	Nominated
1989 (62nd)	Love, Hate and Death	Montoyas y Tarantos	Vicente Escrivá	Not nominated
1990 (63rd)	Ay, Carmela!	¡Ay, Carmela!	Carlos Saura	Not nominated
1991 (64th)	High Heels	Tacones lejanos	Pedro Almodóvar	Not nominated
1992 (65th)	The Fencing Master	El maestro de esgrima	Pedro Olea	Not nominated
1993 (66th)	Belle Époque		Fernando Trueba	Won Academy Award
1994 (67th)	Cradle Song	Canción de cuna	José Luis Garci	Not nominated
1995 (68th)	The Flower of My Secret	La flor de mi secreto	Pedro Almodóvar	Not nominated
1996 (69th)	Bwana	Bwana	Imanol Uribe	Not nominated
1997 (70th)	Secrets of the Heart	Secretos del corazón	Montxo Armendáriz	Nominated
1998 (71st)	The Grandfather	El abuelo	José Luis Garci	Nominated
1999 (72nd)	All About My Mother	Todo sobre mi madre	Pedro Almodóvar	Won Academy Award
2000 (73rd)	You're the One	You're the One: Una historia de entonces	José Luis Garci	Not nominated
2001 (74th)	Mad Love^{[9]}	Juana la Loca	Vicente Aranda	Not nominated
2002 (75th)	Mondays in the Sun^{[8]}	Los lunes al sol	Fernando León de Aranoa	Not nominated
2003 (76th)	Soldiers of Salamis^{[7]}	Soldados de Salamina	David Trueba	Not nominated
2004 (77th)	The Sea Inside^{[6]}	Mar adentro	Alejandro Amenábar	Won Academy Award
2005 (78th)	Obaba^{[5]}		Montxo Armendáriz	Not nominated
2006 (79th)	Volver^{[4]}		Pedro Almodóvar	Made shortlist
2007 (80th)	The Orphanage^{[3]}	El orfanato	Juan Antonio Bayona	Not nominated
2008 (81st)	The Blind Sunflowers^{[2]}	Los girasoles ciegos	José Luis Cuerda	Not nominated
2009 (82nd)	The Dancer and the Thief^{[1]}	El baile de la Victoria	Fernando Trueba	Not nominated
2010 (83rd)	Even the Rain	También la lluvia	Icíar Bollaín	Made shortlist
2011 (84th)	Black Bread	Pa negre	Agustí Villaronga	Not nominated
2012 (85th)	Blancanieves		Pablo Berger	Not nominated
2013 (86th)	15 Years and One Day	15 años y un día	Gracia Querejeta	Not nominated
2014 (87th)	Living Is Easy with Eyes Closed	Vivir es fácil con los ojos cerrados	David Trueba	Not nominated
2015 (88th)	Flowers	Loreak	Jon Garaño and Jose Mari Goenaga	Not nominated
2016 (89th)	Julieta		Pedro Almodóvar	Not nominated
2017 (90th)	Summer 1993	Estiu 1993	Carla Simón	Not nominated
2018 (91st)	Champions	Campeones	Javier Fesser	Not nominated
2019 (92nd)	Pain and Glory	Dolor y gloria	Pedro Almodóvar	Nominated
2020 (93rd)	The Endless Trench	La trinchera infinita	Jon Garaño, Aitor Arregi Galdos and Jose Mari Goenaga	Not nominated
2021 (94th)	The Good Boss	El buen patrón	Fernando León de Aranoa	Made shortlist
2022 (95th)	Alcarràs		Carla Simón	Not nominated
2023 (96th)	Society of the Snow	La sociedad de la nieve	Juan Antonio Bayona	Nominated
2024 (97th)	Saturn Return	Segundo premio	Isaki Lacuesta and Pol Rodríguez	Not nominated
2025 (98th)	Sirāt		Oliver Laxe	Nominated
2026 (99th)	La bola negra		Javier Calvo and Javier Ambrossi	Pending

== Shortlisted films ==
Each year since 2001, Spain has announced a three-film shortlist (four in 2013) prior to announcing its official Oscar candidate. The following films were shortlisted by the Academia de las Artes y las Ciencias Cinematográficas de España but failed to be submitted:

Year	Film
2001	Sex and Lucia · Sin noticias de Dios
2002	Story of a Kiss · Talk to Her
2003	Danube Hotel · South from Granada
2004	Bad Education · Tiovivo c. 1950
2005	Ninette · Princesses
2006	Alatriste · Salvador
2007	13 Roses · Sunday Light
2008	Blood in May · Seven Billiard Tables
2009	Fat People · Map of the Sounds of Tokyo
2010	Cell 211 · Lope
2011	The Skin I Live In · The Sleeping Voice
2012	The Artist and the Model · Unit 7
2013	Cannibal · Family United · Scorpion in Love
2014	10,000 km · El Niño
2015	Felices 140 · Magical Girl
2016	The Bride · The Olive Tree
2017	1898, Our Last Men in the Philippines · Abracadabra
2018	Everybody Knows · Giant
2019	Buñuel in the Labyrinth of the Turtles · While at War
2020	Fire Will Come · The Platform
2021	Mediterraneo: The Law of the Sea · Parallel Mothers
2022	The Beasts · Lullaby
2023	20,000 Species of Bees · Close Your Eyes
2024	The Blue Star · Marco, the Invented Truth
2025	Deaf · Romería
2026	The Beloved · Sundays

== See also ==
- List of Academy Award winners and nominees for Best International Feature Film
- List of Academy Award-winning foreign language films
- List of Spanish Academy Award winners and nominees
