= Fiorella Faltoyano =

Spanish actress

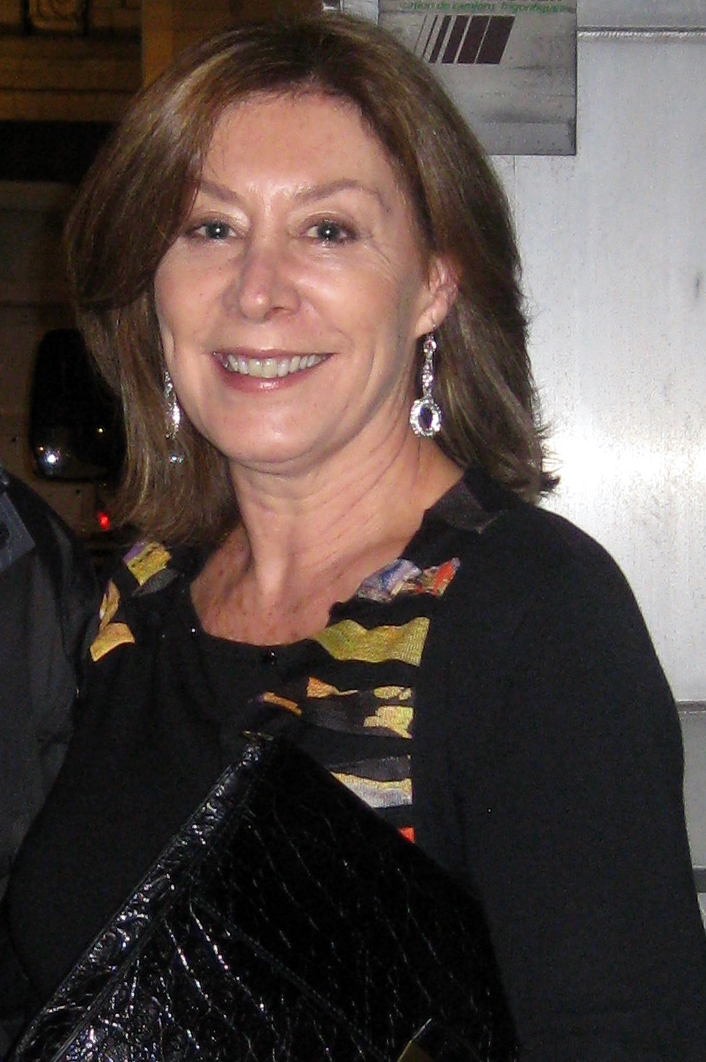
- At Seminci 2011
- Born: María Blanca Gil Paradela; 19 October 1949 (age 76); Málaga, Spain
- Occupation: Actress
- Spouse: José Luis Tafur Carande
- Partner: Fernando Méndez-Leite
- Children: 1
- Parents: Ramón Pardo Arias (father); María de la Asunción Gil Paradela (mother)

María Blanca Fiorella Renzi Gil (née María Blanca Gil Paradela; born 19 October 1949), better known as Fiorella Faltoyano, is a Spanish actress.

== Career ==
Fiorella Faltoyano took dramatic studies, and in 1967 debuted in Nati Mistral's theater company. Almost at the same time she appeared in the Pedro Mario Herrero film Club de solteros. She attained popularity as an actress on the television programs Hora once, Teatro de siempre, Estudio 1, and Novela, and as presenter of the show ¡Señoras y señores!, in the version created by José María Quero in 1974–75.

In 1977, she achieved her greatest film success as a protagonist of Unfinished Business by José Luis Garci, with whom she continued working in Solos en la madrugada (1978) – again with José Sacristán – and in Cradle Song (1994). She shot other films, among them La colmena (1982) and Después del sueño (1992) by Mario Camus, ¡Biba la banda! (Ricardo Palacios, 1987), La sombra del ciprés es alargada (Luis Alcoriza, 1990), and La sal de la vida (Eugenio Martín, 1996).

At the same time she strengthened her television career, participating in La máscara negra (1982), Tango (1991), La regenta (1995), Hermanos de leche (1994–95), Cuéntame cómo pasó (2003–04), Obsesión (2005), Hospital Central (2006), Alfonso, el príncipe maldito (2010), and Amar en tiempos revueltos (2011).

In the theater she starred in The Odd Couple (2001–02), The Children's Hour (2004–07), Agnes of God (2007–09), and Galdosiana (2009–10), plays in which she shared billing and production work with the actress Cristina Higueras through her company, Nueva Comedia.

== Personal life ==
Of Galician and Castilian origin, the biological daughter of an unmarried couple -- Ramón Pardo Arias (1909–1998), native and later mayor of Ferreira de Pantón, Lugo, and María de la Asunción Gil Paradela (1921–2007), a native of Madrid,

Fiorella Faltoyano was born María Blanca Gil Paradela but later took the surname (Renzi) of her Italian stepfather. She spent summers near Ferreira de Pantón with her family. She has two half-brothers, Mauricio and Constantino, children of her mother's marriage with businessman Constantino Faltoyano.

== Marriage and offspring ==
She has one son, Daniel Tafur Renzi, from her marriage to producer José Luis Tafur Carande (1929–2012). She later became the romantic partner of director Fernando Méndez-Leite.

== Books published ==
- Aprobé en septiembre, La Esfera de los Libros, 2014, ISBN 9788490600160

== Filmography ==
- Club de solteros by Pedro Mario Herrero (1967)
- Un día es un día by Francisco Prósper (1968)
- Las panteras se comen a los ricos by Tito Fernández (1969)
- Colorín colorado (1976), de José Luis García Sánchez.
- Unfinished Business by José Luis Garci (1977)
- Solos en la madrugada by José Luis Garci (1978)
- La campanada by Jaime Camino (1979)
- Cristóbal Colón, de oficio... descubridor by Mariano Ozores (1982)
- La colmena by Mario Camus (1982)
- Café, coca y puro by Antonio del Real (1984)
- A la pálida luz de la luna by José María González-Sinde (1985)
- ¡Biba la banda! by Ricardo Palacios (1987)
- Gallego by Manuel Octavio Gómez (1987)
- La sombra del ciprés es alargada by Luis Alcoriza (1990)
- Después del sueño by Mario Camus (1992)
- Tocando fondo by José Luis Cuerda (1993)
- Cradle Song by José Luis Garci (1994)
- La sal de la vida by Eugenio Martín (1995)
- El Síndrome Martins by Jaime Magdalena (1999, short)
- Luminaria by Álvaro Giménez-Sarmiento (2005, short)

== Television ==
- Hermenegildo Pérez, para servirle (1966)
- Historias para no dormir
  - El asfalto (24 June 1966)
  - El trasplante (15 March 1968)
- Novela
  - La rima (23 January 1966)
  - Contraseña del alba (12 April 1966)
  - The Pelegrín System (17 October 1966)
  - Nosotros, los Rivero (2 June 1969)
  - El diablo en la botella (17 May 1971)
  - The Marriage (9 August 1971)
  - El Conde Fernán González (18 October 1971)
  - Luz y conciencia de Borja (30 October 1972)
  - Humiliated and Insulted (2 January 1973)
  - Vanity Fair (23 April 1973)
  - Los Dombey (30 August 1976)
  - Pequeño teatro (7 March 1977)
  - La duquesa de Langeais (25 December 1978)
- Tiempo y hora
  - La casualidad (27 March 1966)
- Estudio 1
  - Una doncella francesa (3 August 1966)
  - Life Is a Dream (1967)
  - In the Best of Families (20 February 1968)
  - Aprobado en inocencia (30 April 1968)
  - Un paraguas bajo la lluvia (11 February 1969)
  - Catalina de Aragón (22 July 1969)
  - Los recién casados (26 March 1971)
  - The Trojan War Will Not Take Place (30 April 1971)
  - La enemiga (24 September 1971)
  - Celos del aire (19 November 1971)
  - Los milagros del desprecio (14 July 1972)
  - Las flores (30 March 1973)
  - Las mujeres sabias (1 March 1974)
  - El aprendiz de amante (4 August 1975)
  - El alma se serena (8 September 1975)
  - Usted puede ser un asesino (29 February 2000)
- Las doce caras de Juan
  - Virgo (9 December 1967)
- La pequeña comedia
  - El anuncio (21 June 1968)
- Hora once
  - La prueba de la fidelidad (15 September 1968)
  - Cómo se casó Álvar Fáñez (5 September 1970)
  - El viudo Lowell (24 July 1971)
  - La falsa amante (11 November 1972)
  - Doble error (28 January 1974)
- El premio
  - Unos instantes (11 November 1968)
- La risa española
  - Tres piernas de mujer (11 July 1969)
- Teatro de siempre
  - Intriga y amor (9 February 1970)
  - La tejedora de sueños (30 March 1970)
  - Los recién casados (11 May 1970)
  - Por la fuente, Juana (6 July 1970)
  - The Misanthrope (24 August 1970)
  - Los cuervos (5 November 1970)
  - Madame Fimiani (27 November 1972)
- Teatro de misterio
  - El sello de lacre (14 September 1970)
- La tía de Ambrosio (4 June 1971)
- Sospecha
  - La escalada de la Señora Stitch (6 July 1971)
  - La paga del policía (31 August 1971)
- Visto para sentencia
  - La segunda perla (16 August 1971)
- Ficciones
  - El maleficio (4 November 1972)
- ¡Señoras y señores! by Valeriu Lazarov (1974–1975)
- Curro Jiménez
  - Los rehenes (8 May 1977)
- Tango (1991)
- Hermanos de leche (1994–1995)
- Truhanes
  - Yo perdí todo en veinte días (6 March 1994)
- La Regenta by Fernando Méndez-Leite (1995)
- La vida en el aire (1997)
- Cuéntame cómo pasó (2003–2004)
- Obsesión (2005)
- Hospital Central (2006)
- Marqués Mendigo (2007)
- Les morères (2007)
- 700 euros, diario secreto de una call girl (2008)
- Alfonso, el príncipe maldito (2010)
- Amar en tiempos revueltos (2011)
- Los misterios de Laura
  - Laura y el misterio de la habitación 308 (14 January 2014)
- La cocinera de Castamar (2021)

== Awards ==
- Medal of the Círculo de Escritores Cinematográficos as Best Actress for Cradle Song (1994)
- Named Rabaliana 2012 by the Milana Bonita Association
