= Yolanda Ríos =

Spanish actress

- Born: Yolanda Císcar Mateu; 12 December 1951; Caracas, Venezuela
- Died: 26 April 2012 (aged 60); Madrid, Spain
- Occupation: Actress
- Years active: 1970–2012
- Spouse: Juan Calot

Yolanda Císcar Mateu (12 December 1951 – 26 April 2012), known professionally as Yolanda Ríos, was a Venezuelan–born Spanish actress best known for her appearances on the game show Un, dos, tres... responda otra vez and her theatrical performances.

== Beginnings ==
Yolanda Ríos broke onto the artistic scene at 19, playing a small role in Javier Aguirre's film Pierna creciente, falda menguante (1970), and a year later she appeared in the premiere of Antonio Buero Vallejo's play Llegada de los dioses.

From there she jumped to Televisión Española, where she participated in some episodes of the series Remite: Maribel (1970) and Tres eran tres (1972).

== Television ==
Ríos found popularity when Narciso Ibáñez Serrador chose her as one of the hostesses of the first stage of the game show Un, dos, tres... responda otra vez, where she remained from 1972 to 1973, and on the first program of 1976, in which she and her fellow secretaries chose new secretaries by giving them their glasses. She gave hers to María Durán.

A few months after the end of the contest, there was a renewal in the direction and presentation of the Sunday afternoon show Tarde para todos led by Juan Antonio Fernández Abajo. Its new director, Oscar Banegas, entrusted the young Yolanda Ríos to lead the three-hour variety program with actor Nicolás Romero from The Chiripitiflauticos.

In subsequent years she made other forays into television, although increasingly further apart. She appeared in episodes of the series La señora García se confiesa (1977), Los libros (1977), Segunda enseñanza (1986), Éste es mi barrio (1997), Petra Delicado (1999), and El comisario (2000), as well as the plays Cincuenta años de felicidad (1972) and Molière's The Imaginary Invalid (1979) on the show Estudio 1.

== Film ==
After her brief experience as a TV presenter, and throughout the 1970s, she continued to play small roles in films such as El secreto inconfesable de un chico bien (1976), La espada negra (1976) by Francisco Rovira Beleta, and Sesión continua (1984) by José Luis Garci.

== Theater ==
In theater she premiered plays such as Les Poissons rouges (1973) by Jean Anouilh, El afán de cada noche (1975) by Pedro Gil Paradela, What the Butler Saw (1979) by Joe Orton, Vivamos hoy (1979) by Santiago Moncada, and La vieja señorita del paraíso (1980), by Antonio Gala.

In 1986 she joined the Compañía Nacional de Teatro Clásico, directed by Adolfo Marsillach.

== Later career ==
After training as a set designer with Elena Kriukova, she worked in that role on Yo, Leonor (2006), performed by María Luisa Merlo. In her last years she focused on the production of shows such as Grease and Spamalot.

== Personal life ==
She was married to actor and stage director Juan Calot (son of actress Encarna Paso), the father of her two children Alicia and Edgar.

On 26 April 2012, Yolanda Ríos died in Madrid at age 60.
