= Melilla Film Week =

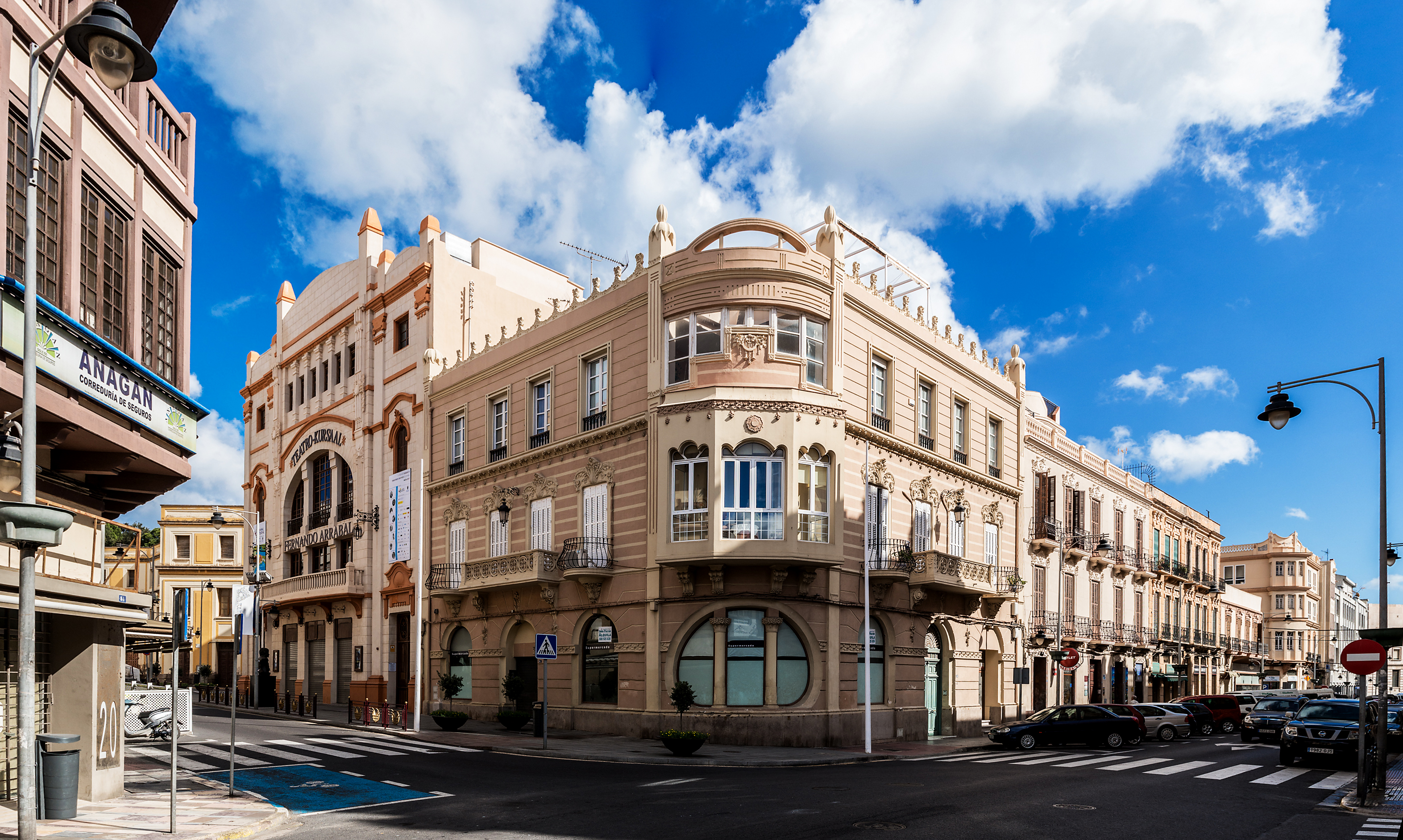
- Location: Melilla, Spain
- Founded: 2008
- Most recent: 2024
- Awards: José Sacristán, Ciudad de Melilla
- Hosted by: Semana de Cine de Melilla
- Language: Spanish

Current: 16th Melilla Film Week
- 17th Melilla Film Week 15th Melilla Film Week

The Melilla Film Week (abbr.; Spanish: Semana de Cine de Merlilla, is an annual film festival held in the Spanish city of Melilla in May.

Since its creation in 2008 it has been promoted by the Autonomous City of Melilla.

== History ==
The first edition was in 2008 and since then the quality of the films shown and the category of the invited artists has been improving.

== Awards ==
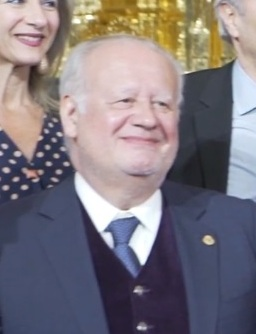
Juan Echanove, Award José Sacristán in 2024

A jury evaluates the films in the Official Selection and awards the following prizes:

- José Sacristán for Best Film
- Ciudad de Melilla

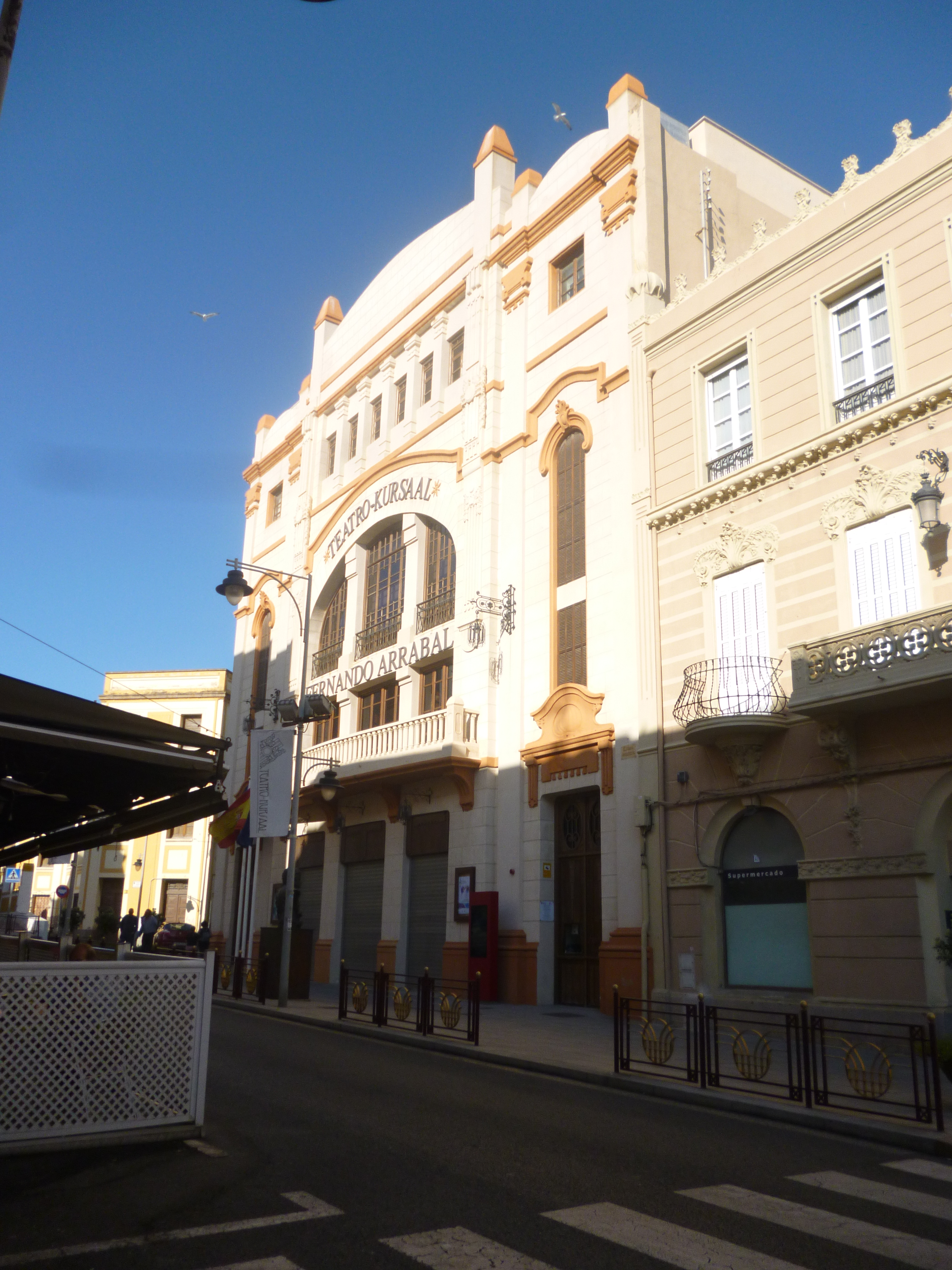
Facade of the Theatre Kursaal-Fernando Arrabal

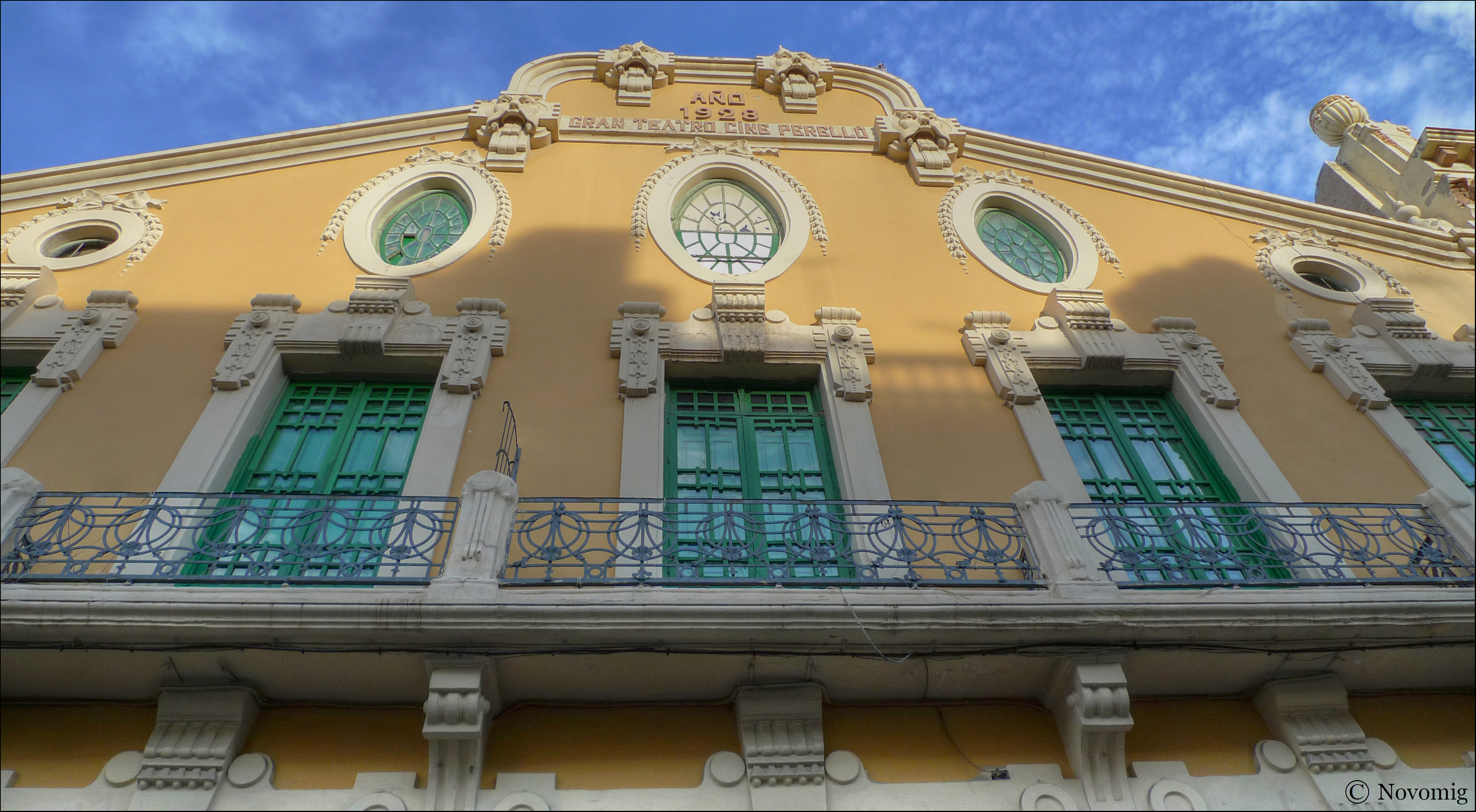
Sight of the Perelló Theater-Cinema
