= Tres eran tres =

Tres eran tres may refer to:

- Tres eran tres (TV series) (1972-1973), Spanish TV series directed by Jaime de Armiñán which was broadcast in Televisión Española
- Tres eran tres (film) (1955), Spanish comedy film directed by Eduardo García Maroto
