= Volver a empezar =

Volver a empezar may refer to:

- "Volver a Empezar" (song), a 1981 Spanish-language version, by Julio Iglesias, of "Begin the Beguine", written by Cole Porter
- Volver a empezar (film), or Begin the Beguine, a 1982 Spanish film
- Volver a Empezar (TV series), a 1994–1995 Mexican telenovela
