= Solos en la madrugada =

- Theatrical release poster
- Directed by: José Luis Garci
- Written by: José Luis Garci; José María González Sinde
- Produced by: José Luis Tafur
- Starring: José Sacristán; Fiorella Faltoyano
- Cinematography: Manuel Rojas
- Edited by: Miguel González Sinde
- Music by: Jesús Gluck
- Production company: José Luis Tafur P.C
- Release date: 3 April 1978 (Spain)
- Running time: 102 minutes
- Country: Spain
- Language: Spanish

Solos en la madrugada (English: "Alone in the Dark") is a 1978 Spanish film written and directed by José Luis Garci, starring José Sacristán and Fiorella Faltoyano. The film built on the success of Garci's previous and successful film Asignatura pendiente, but did not have the same results.

== Plot ==
José Miguel García, a thirty-seven years old radio announcer, has achieved professional success with his late-night radio show Solos en la madrugada (Alone in the morning) which is devoted to criticizing the government of caudillo Francisco Franco. The program has achieved the highest audience in the country. The space, full of irony, is directed to those men and women born during the Spanish civil war or in the years immediately after, whom he accuses of cowardice and failing in a life burdened by the past.

The journalist pessimistic point of views are a reflection of the dissatisfaction he faces in his own life. José Miguel is separated from his wife, Elena, with whom he has two children, whom he rarely sees. During this period of his life comes the opportunity to begin a new life with a girl named Maite, who belongs to a generation of war and the postwar period.

== Cast ==
- José Sacristán - José Miguel García Carande
- Fiorella Faltoyano - Elena
- Emma Cohen - Maite
- María Casanova - Lola

== DVD release ==
Solos en la madrugada is available in Region 2 DVD in Spanish only. It was released on DVD in 2009.
