= ¡Arriba Hazaña! =

- Theatrical release poster
- Directed by: José Mª Gutiérrez
- Screenplay by: José Mª Gutiérrez; José Sámano
- Based on: El infierno y la brisa by José María Vaz de Soto
- Produced by: José Sámano
- Starring: Fernando Fernán-Gómez; Héctor Alterio; José Sacristán
- Cinematography: Magín Torruella
- Music by: Luis Eduardo Aute
- Production company: Sabre Films
- Release date: 28 May 1978
- Country: Spain
- Language: Spanish

¡Arriba Hazaña! is a 1978 Spanish film directed by José María Gutiérrez Santos based on the 1971 novel El infierno y la brisa by José María Vaz de Soto.

== Plot ==
Set in a religious boarding school in the last rales of the Francoist dictatorship, the plot tracks a students' rebellion in the centre.

== Cast ==
- Gabriel Llopart as Antonio
- José Cerro as Manuel
- Ramón Reparaz as Julio
- Luis Ciges as Ángel
- José Franco as el Enfermero
- Ángel Álvarez as Pedro
- Héctor Alterio as hermano director
- Fernando Fernán-Gómez as el hermano Ramón, el prefecto
- José Sacristán as el nuevo director
- Andrés Isbert as José Luis Hervás
- Enrique San Francisco as Jesús Fernández
- Iñaki Miramón as Julián Ceballos
- Hans Isbert as Julián Martín
- Carlos Coque as Juan Choperena
- José Luis Pérez as Lamberto Sáenz
- Baltasar Ortega as Clemente Rico
- Emilio Siegrist as Barambones
- Agustín Navarro as Juanito Morán
- Emilio García as Hermoso

== Release ==
The film premiered on 24 May 1978.

== See also ==
- List of Spanish films of 1978

== Bibliography ==
- Alonso Gutiérrez, Juan Manuel (2016). "¡Arriba Hazaña!: la transición española contra la enseñanza Franquista" (PDF). Transiciones de la dictadura a la democracia. Americana eBooks & Inter-American Research Center. pp. 388–397. ISBN 978-615-5423-30-7.
- Barrenetxea Marañón, Igor (2020). "Alumbrando la Transición a través del Cine en ¡Arriba Hazaña! (1978) de José María Gutiérrez Santos". Filmhistoria Online. 30 (1). Universitat de Barcelona. ISSN 2014-668X.
