= La sombra del ciprés es alargada =

- Theatrical release poster
- Directed by: Luis Alcoriza
- Screenplay by: Luis Alcoriza
- Based on: La sombra del ciprés es alargada by Miguel Delibes
- Cinematography: Hans Bürmann
- Edited by: José Antonio Rojo
- Music by: Gregorio García Segura
- Production companies: Rosa García PC; Alción Films; Conacite-Dos
- Distributed by: United International Pictures
- Release date: 25 May 1990 (Spain)
- Countries: Mexico; Spain
- Language: Spanish

La sombra del ciprés es alargada (transl. 'The Shadow of the Cypress Is Long') is a 1990 Mexican-Spanish film directed by Luis Alcoriza. It is based on the book of the same name, written by Miguel Delibes.

== Plot ==
Set in Ávila in the early 20th century, the first part deals with the childhood of orphan boy Pedro, while the second deals with Pedro's adulthood as a seaman as he experiences a love story overseas.

== Cast ==
- Emilio Gutiérrez Caba as don Mateo
- Fiorella Faltoyano as doña Gregoria
- Juanjo Guerenabarrena as Pedro
- Dany Prius as Jane
- María Rojo as Rosa
- Julián Pastor as don Alfonso

== Release ==
Distributed by United International Pictures, the film was released theatrically in Spain on 25 May 1990.

== Accolades ==
Year	Award	Category	Nominee(s)	Result	Ref.
1991	5th Goya Awards	Best Adapted Screenplay	Luis Alcoriza	Nominated	

== See also ==
- List of Spanish films of 1990
