= Fernando Méndez-Leite =

Spanish film critic, lecturer and filmmaker

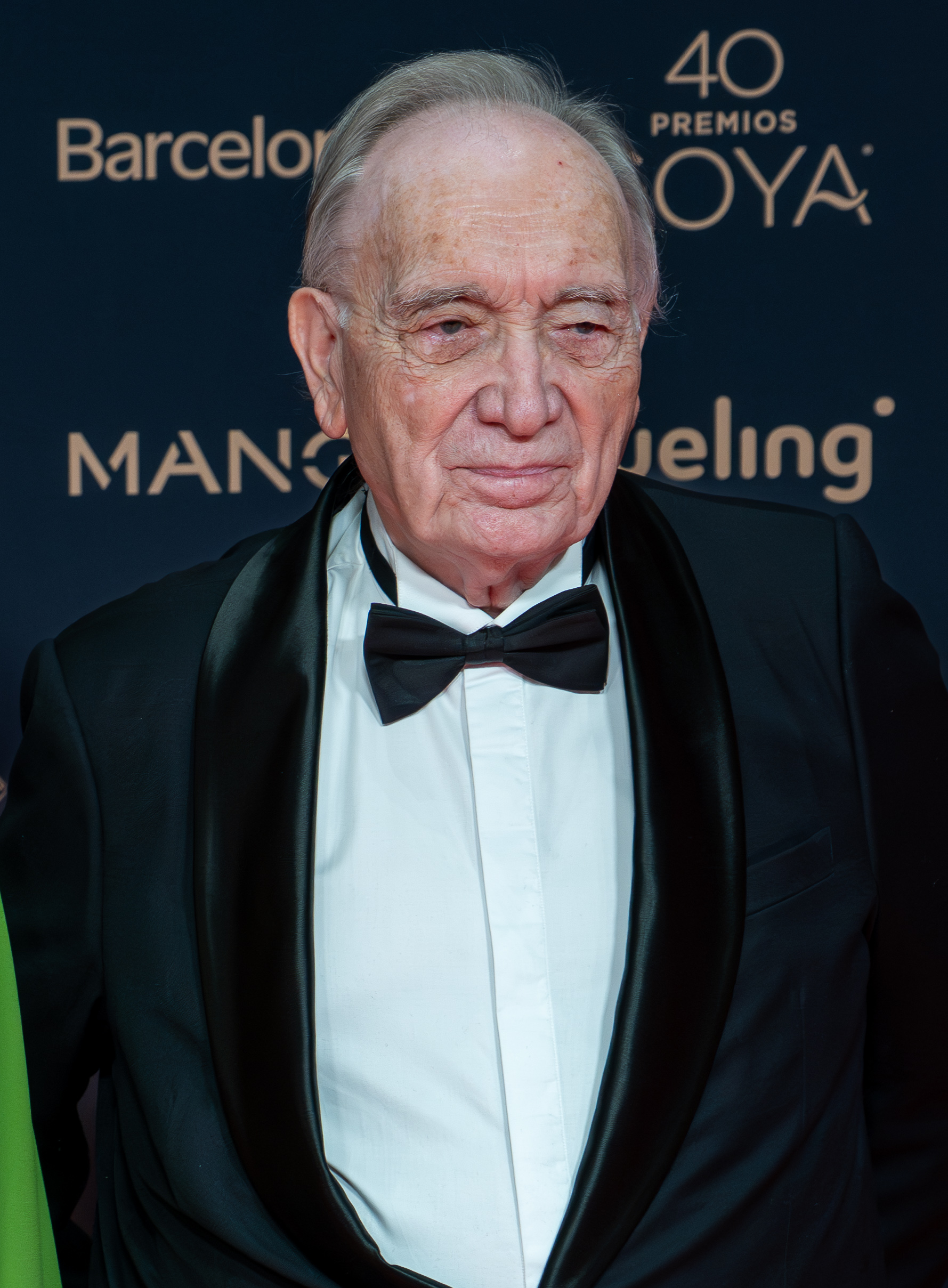
- Méndez-Leite in 2026
- Born: Fernando Méndez-Leite Serrano; 6 May 1944 (age 82); Madrid, Spain
- Occupations: Film critic; film director; theatre director; cultural manager; television director; university lecturer; screenwriter; playwright
- Partner: Fiorella Faltoyano

Fernando Méndez-Leite Serrano (born 6 May 1944) is a Spanish film critic, lecturer and filmmaker. He has also worked in theatre and television. He became the president of the Academy of Cinematographic Arts and Sciences of Spain in 2022.

== Biography ==
Fernando Méndez-Leite Serrano was born in Madrid on 6 May 1944, son to Fernando Méndez-Leite von Haffe, a falangist film writer, author of a History of the Spanish Cinema. He studied filmmaking at the EOC for two years after graduating in law from the University of Madrid in 1968.

He has been active as a film critic since 1966, writing for publications such as Pueblo, Diario 16, Fotogramas and Guía del Ocio de Madrid, and, from 1968 to 1981, as a lecturer on Film Theory and History of Contemporary Cinema at the University of Valladolid.

Among other institutional and academic positions, he has helmed the ICAA (1986–1988), the ECAM (1994–2012), and, since 2022, the Academy of Cinematographic Arts and Sciences of Spain. A member of the Málaga Film Festival's managing committee since its inception, he was worked as a film festival programmer and as a liaison with the press there.

He has had one daughter with her partner Fiorella Faltoyano: actress and acting teacher Clara Méndez-Leite.

== Filmography ==
- El hombre de moda (1980; debut feature)
- El productor (2006) (documentary)
- Ay Carmen (2018) (documentary)

== Books ==
- Historia del cine español en 100 películas. Madrid: Jupey. 1985.
- Argentina en el cine español. Madrid: Instituto de la Cinematografía y de las Artes Audiovisuales. 1993.

Academic offices
Preceded by Mariano Barroso	President of the Academy of Cinematographic Arts and Sciences of Spain; 2022–present	Incumbent
