= Course Completed =

- Theatrical release poster
- Directed by: José Luis Garci
- Written by: José Luis Garci; Horacio Valcárcel
- Produced by: José Luis Garci
- Starring: Jesús Puente; Victoria Vera; Teresa Gimpera; Eduardo Hoyo
- Cinematography: Manuel Rojas
- Edited by: Miguel González Sinde
- Music by: Jesús Gluck
- Distributed by: United International Pictures
- Release dates: 23 April 1987 (Spain); 5 May 1988 (Argentina)
- Running time: 94 minutes
- Country: Spain
- Language: Spanish

Course Completed (Spanish: Asignatura aprobada) is a 1987 Spanish drama film written, produced and directed by José Luis Garci. The film was an Academy Award nominee for Best Foreign Language Film at the 60th Academy Awards.

== Synopsis ==
Following the failure of his latest work and the departure of his wife, José Manuel Alcántara decides to leave Madrid for Asturias in pursuit of a quiet life as a radio and press collaborator. However, his past mistakes will resurface, including his rocker son and a former love interest.

== Cast ==
- Jesús Puente as José Manuel Alcántara
- Victoria Vera as Elena Álvarez
- Teresa Gimpera as Lola
- Eduardo Hoyo as Edi
- Pastor Serrador in a bit part
- Ana Rosa Quintana as Ana Rosa Quintana
- Manuel Lorenzo
- Pablo Hoyos
- Santiago Amón
- Juan Cueto
- Silverio Cañada
- José Manuel Fernández
- Pedro Lazaga
- Andrés Presumido
- Fernando P. Pieri as New Year's Eve concert announcer
- Joaquín Carballino
- Pedro Infanzón
- Primitivo Rojas as Radio advertisement announcer

== Production ==
The project stemmed from a conversation with former football player and then-manager of Sporting de Gijón, José Manuel Fernández, and from a sentence he wrote at the Reconquista Hotel in Oviedo before presenting the Premios Princesa de Asturias de las Artes award to Luis García Berlanga: "In my life, there have always been two days left, two completely useless days, yesterday and tomorrow." Garci had stated he wouldn't make any more films until José María Calviño resigned as Director-General of RTVE or relented, and a few days later, he initiated the project.

Filming took place between November 2nd and December 23rd, 1986, in Asturias, particularly in the city of Gijón. The film had a budget of 150 million pesetas. Actress Encarna Paso couldn't participate due to her commitments in the theater; the role was filled by Teresa Gimpera.

== Awards ==
The film was an Academy Award nominee as Best Foreign Film. Garci won the Goya Award as Best Director.

== See also ==
- List of submissions to the 60th Academy Awards for Best Foreign Language Film
- List of Spanish submissions for the Academy Award for Best Foreign Language Film
