= José Bódalo =

Spanish actor (1916–1985)

- Born: José Bódalo Zúffoli; March 24, 1916; Córdoba, Argentina
- Died: July 24, 1985 (aged 69); Madrid, Spain
- Occupation: Actor
- Years active: 1930–1985
- Spouse: Alicia Fernández Tomás
- Children: 2

José Bódalo Zúffoli (March 24, 1916 – July 24, 1985) was a Spanish film actor.

== Biography ==
Bódalo was born in Córdoba, Argentina, the son of Rome-born actress Eugenia Zúffoli and Spanish actor and singer José Bódalo, Sr. His birth in Argentina coincided with his family's artistic tour, but he soon moved to Madrid, where he began studying medicine. He made over 120 film and TV appearances between 1930 and his death in 1985.

From the mid to late 1960s he prolifically appeared in Spaghetti Western films which were often Spanish and Italian co produced. He played the role of General Hugo Rodriguez in the 1966 film Django opposite Franco Nero; and also performed in Begin the Beguine, the film that won the 1982 Academy Award for Best Foreign Language Film.

He appeared in many comedy or drama films in Spain but also appeared in many television series particularly after 1970 such as Novela from 1969–1977 and Estudio 1 in the early 1980s.

He died on 24 July 1985 at the age of 69.

== Selected filmography ==
- El secreto del doctor (1930) - Sr. Redding
- Alhucemas (1948) - Comandante Almendro
- Delírio de Amor (1948)
- Tempest (1949) - Pedro Montero
- Tormented Soul (1950)
- Agustina of Aragon (1950) - Capitán francés
- Truhanes de honor (1950) - Gomané
- Balarrasa (1951) - Presidente del club
- A Tale of Two Villages (1951)
- Come Die My Love (1952) - Eddie
- Facultad de letras (1952)
- Devil's Roundup (1952) - Hombre
- Amaya (1952) - Teodosio
- La laguna negra (1952) - Venargas
- Cabaret (1953) - Luis
- Flight 971 (1953) - Hugo Carrara
- Three are Three (1955) - (segment "Introducción: Tribunal")
- El andén (1957) - Manuel
- Frei Escova (1961) - (uncredited)
- Vamos a contar mentiras (1961) - Juan
- Kill and Be Killed (1962) - Doctor Cáceres
- Teresa de Jesús (1962) - Padre confesor
- The Mustard Grain (1962) - Horcajo
- Los derechos de la mujer (1963) - El cónyuge
- Cristo negro (1963) - Janson
- The Twin Girls (1963) - Raphael Carrasco Ramírez
- El juego de la verdad (1963) - Miguel
- Ensayo general para la muerte (1963) - Dr. Víctor Lepetre
- Los elegidos (1964) - Padre de Miguel
- El pecador y la bruja (1964) - Padre Enrique
- El salario del crimen (1964) - Vílchez - Comisario de policía
- Búsqueme a esa chica (1964) - Lorenzo - padre de Marisol
- Prohibido soñar (1964)
- Cotolay (1965) - Maese Mateo
- Ringo's Big Night (1966) - Sheriff Sam
- Dollars for a Fast Gun (1966) - Martin
- Spies Strike Silently (1966) - Inspector Craig
- Django (1966) - Gen. Hugo Rodriguez
- La Barrera (1966) - Panadero
- Nuevo en esta plaza (1966) - Manuel Romero
- Killer 77, Alive or Dead (1966) - George King
- Hoy como ayer (1966) - Aniceto72
- Sound of Horror (1966) - Mr. Dorman
- Thompson 1880 (1966) - Judge Lennox
- Fantasía... 3 (1966) - (uncredited)
- Las cicatrices (1967) - Miguel Benjumea
- Red Blood, Yellow Gold (1967) - El Primero
- Train for Durango (1968) - Mexican Boss
- Persecución hasta Valencia (1968) - Marcos
- It's Your Move (1968) - Ispettore Vogel
- Day After Tomorrow (1968) - Colonel Jefferson
- Los que tocan el piano (1968) - Don Ernesto Dávila, inspector de policía
- Giugno '44 - Sbarcheremo in Normandia (1968) - Duvallier
- Setenta veces siete (1968)
- Las amigas (1969) - Luisito
- Blood in the Bullring (1969) - Rafael
- Garringo (1969) - Sheriff Klaus
- Educando a una idiota (1969) - Eurico Sánchez Fil
- El mejor del mundo (1970) - Padre de José
- Compañeros (1970) - General Mongo Álvarez
- Un aller simple (1971) - (uncredited)
- Captain Apache (1971) - General
- Aventura en las islas Cíes (1972)
- Una mujer prohibida (1974) - Comisario
- Unmarried Mothers (1975)
- El mejor regalo (1975) - Don Carlos Álvarez
- Ambitious (1976) - D. Matías
- La espada negra (1976) - Alfonso Carrillo de Acuña, Arzobispo de Toledo
- Réquiem por un empleado (1978)
- Father Cami's Wedding (1979) - Padre Antonio Bissus
- Tiempos de constitución (1979)
- And in the Third Year, He Rose Again (1980) - Cura de Rebollar de la Mata
- Spoiled Children (1980) - Don Fabián de Luna (1978)
- El Crack (1981) - Don Ricardo
- Asalto al casino (1981)
- Begin the Beguine (1982) - Roxiu
- Las chicas del bingo (1982) - Vicente
- La colmena (1982) - Don Roque
- El Crack (1983) - Don Ricardo
- The Autonomines (1983) - Don Luciano
- The Cheerful Colsada Girls (1984) - Don Matías
- El último kamikaze (1984) - Sr. Fulton
- Últimas tardes con Teresa (1984) - Cardenal
- Mi amigo el vagabundo (1984) - Esopo
- Sesión continua (1984) - Dionisio Balboa
