= Sesión continua =

- Theatrical release poster
- Directed by: José Luis Garci
- Written by: José Luis Garci; Horacio Valcárcel
- Produced by: José Luis Garci
- Starring: Adolfo Marsillach; Jesús Puente; Encarna Paso; Emma Suárez; María Casanova
- Cinematography: Manuel Rojas
- Edited by: Miguel González Sinde
- Music by: Jesús Gluck
- Release date: 10 September 1984; (Spain)
- Running time: 115 minutes
- Country: Spain
- Language: Spanish

Sesión continua (English: Double Feature) is a 1984 Spanish drama film written, produced, and directed by José Luis Garci. The film received an Academy Award nomination for Best Foreign Language Film at the 58th Academy Awards.

== Synopsis ==
Following his separation from his wife, José Manuel Varela is gearing up for the production of his film Slow Descent into Depression, a collaborative effort with his friend Federico Alcántara, who is grappling with his recent divorce. The narrative revolves around the bond between the two writers—one a novelist and the other a screenwriter.

== Cast ==
- Adolfo Marsillach as José Manuel Varela
- Jesús Puente as Federico Alcántara
- María Casanova as Graciela dos Santos Varela 'La Mala'
- José Bódalo as Dionisio Balboa
- Encarna Paso as Pili
- Víctor Valverde as actor portraying 'The Minister'
- Patricia Calot as actress portraying 'The Philosophy Student'
- Pablo Hoyos
- Emma Suárez as Sonia
- Rafael Hernández as Balboa Films production employee
- Yolanda Ríos as Amelia
- Juan Calot
- Diana Salcedo
- Primitivo Rojas as Announcer
- Maite Marchante
- Jesús Hermida as himself

== Production ==
Initially, the lead roles were intended for Alfredo Landa and José Sacristán. However, disputes between the two actors over who should receive top billing led to their departure from the project. Jesús Puente and Adolfo Marsillach were subsequently chosen as replacements. By the time the film was produced, Garci also worked as radio presenter on Antena 3 Radio. Some of the uncredited actors that can be seen in the film are actually presenters on the same radio station.

For the football match attended by the characters played by Puente, Bódalo, and Marsillach at the Vicente Calderón Stadium, Garci utilized the match from 26 February 1984, between Atlético Madrid and Sporting de Gijón, which ended in a 1-1 draw, with goals scored by Rubio for the home team and Mesa for the visitors.

== See also ==
- List of submissions to the 57th Academy Awards for Best Foreign Language Film
- List of Spanish submissions for the Academy Award for Best Foreign Language Film
