= Marta (1971 film) =

1971 film

- Spanish release poster
- Directed by: José Antonio Nieves Conde
- Written by: Juan José Alonso Millán; Ricardo López Aranda; Tito Carpi
- Based on: Marta; 1969 play by Juan José Alonso Millán
- Produced by: José Frade
- Starring: Marisa Mell; Stephen Boyd
- Cinematography: Ennio Guarnieri
- Music by: Piero Piccioni
- Release date: 11 April 1971
- Running time: 96 minutes
- Countries: Spain; Italy
- Language: Spanish

Marta (released in Italy as ...dopo di che, uccide il maschio e lo divora, translated to Afterwards, It Kills and Devours the Male) is a 1971 Spanish-Italian giallo film directed by José Antonio Nieves Conde, and written by Juan José Alonso Millán, based on his 1969 Madrid stage play of the same name.

The film was selected as the Spanish entry for the Best Foreign Language Film at the 44th Academy Awards, but was not accepted as a nominee.

== Plot ==
A rich landowner named Don Miguel is haunted by his deceased mother's ghost, as, years earlier, he murdered her when she walked in on his lovemaking. Pilar, a beautiful fugitive on the run for killing a man, seeks to stay for a while at Miguel's mansion and the two develop a sexual relationship. The woman bears a striking resemblance to his missing wife Marta, who disappeared years earlier. Miguel always suspected his wife may have been murdered.

== Cast ==
- Marisa Mell dual role as Marta & Pilar
- Stephen Boyd as Don Miguel
- George Rigaud as Arturo
- Howard Ross as Luis
- Jesús Puente as Don Carlos
- Isa Miranda as Elena
- Nélida Quiroga as Dona Clara

== See also ==
- List of submissions to the 44th Academy Awards for Best Foreign Language Film
- List of Spanish submissions for the Academy Award for Best Foreign Language Film
