= Academy of Cinematographic Arts and Sciences of Spain =

Spanish cinema-promoting organization

- Academia de las Artes y las Ciencias Cinematográficas de España

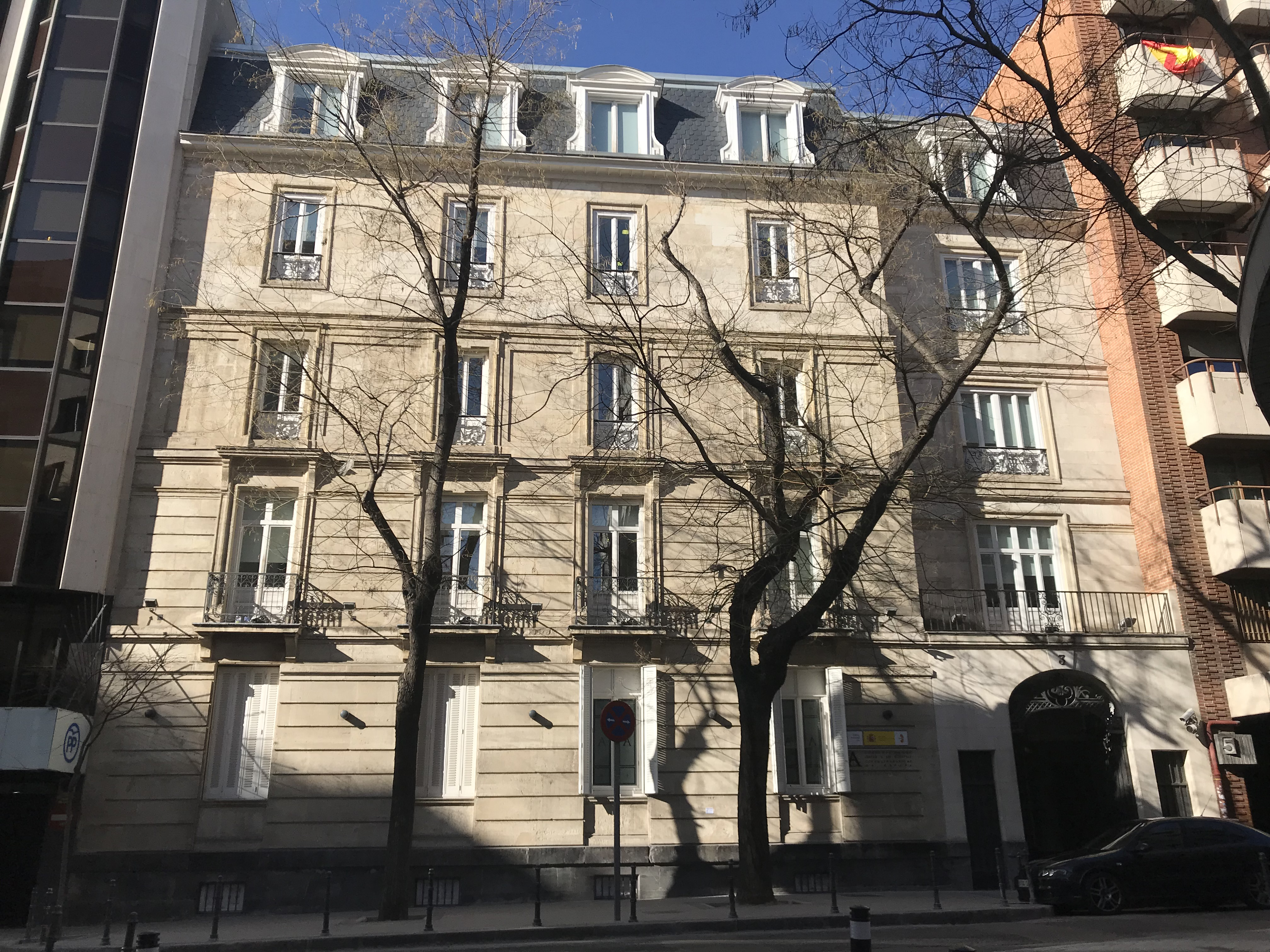
- Abbreviation: AACCE
- Formation: 8 January 1986; 40 years ago
- Type: Film organization
- Purpose: Promotion and development of Spanish cinema
- Headquarters: Calle Zurbano, 3, 28010
- Location: Madrid, Spain
- Members: c. 3,000 (2026)
- President: Fernando Méndez-Leite
- Website: www.academiadecine.com

The Academy of Cinematographic Arts and Sciences of Spain (Spanish: Academia de las Artes y las Ciencias Cinematográficas de España) is a professional organisation dedicated to the promotion and development of Spanish cinema. Founded in 1986, it is responsible for the annual Goya Awards, Spain's principal film awards. It is headquartered in Madrid.

It is a founding member of the Film Academy Network Europe (FAN) and the Ibero-American Federation of Academies of Cinematographic Arts and Sciences (FIACINE).

Since 2022, the academy is presided by Fernando Méndez-Leite.

== History ==
The seed of the academy lies in a meeting of film industry professionals convened by producer Alfredo Matas at Madrid's O'Pazo Restaurant on 12 November 1985. A list of attendees to the meeting is listed as follows:

- Luis García Berlanga, director
- Carlos Saura, director
- Marisol Carnicero, unit production manager
- Tedy Villalba, unit production manager
- José Sacristán, actor
- Charo López, actress
- Pablo González del Amo, film editor
- José Luis Matesanz, film editor
- Manuel Matji, screenwriter
- José Nieto, musician
- Carlos Suárez, cinematographer
- Ramiro Gómez, set designer

The academy was duly founded on 8 January 1986. The 1st Goya Awards were presented in March 1987. In 2006, the academy was one of the ten founding members of the Film Academy Network Europe (FAN). In 2007, the academy opened its headquarters (hitherto located in Calle de Sagasta) in Calle de Zurbano 3, Madrid. In 2017, it was a founding member of Ibero-American Federation of Academies of Cinematographic Arts and Sciences (FIACINE).

== Presidents ==
- José María González-Sinde, 1986–1988
- Fernando Trueba, 1988
- Antonio Giménez Rico 1988–1992
- Fernando Rey, 1992–1994
- Gerardo Herrero, 1994
- José Luis Borau, 1994–1998
- Aitana Sánchez-Gijón, 1998–2000
- Marisa Paredes, 2000–2003
- Mercedes Sampietro, 2003–2006
- Ángeles González Sinde, 2006–2009
- Eduardo Campoy, 2009
- Álex de la Iglesia, 2009–2011
- Enrique González Macho, 2011–2015
- Antonio Resines, 2015–2016
- Yvonne Blake, 2016–2018
- Mariano Barroso, 2018–2022
- Fernando Méndez-Leite, since 2022
