= Sleepwalkers (1978 film) =

- Film poster
- Spanish: Sonámbulos
- Directed by: Manuel Gutiérrez Aragón
- Screenplay by: Manuel Gutiérrez Aragón
- Starring: Ana Belén; Norman Brisky; Mª Rosa Salgado; Lola Gaos; José Luis Gómez
- Cinematography: Teo Escamilla
- Edited by: José Salcedo
- Music by: José Nieto
- Production company: Profilmes
- Release date: September 1978 (San Sebastián)
- Country: Spain
- Language: Spanish

Sleepwalkers (Spanish: Sonámbulos) is a 1978 Spanish film written and directed by Manuel Gutiérrez Aragón starring Ana Belén alongside Norman Briski, María Rosa Salgado, Lola Gaos and José Luis Gómez. It was selected as the Spanish entry for the Best Foreign Language Film at the 51st Academy Awards, but it was not nominated.

== Plot ==
The plot's historical backdrop is the Burgos trials. Ana, an activist involved in the anti-Francoist struggle, has seemingly converted some of her life's worries into bodily symptoms, suffering from strange maladies.

== Cast ==
- Ana Belén as Ana
- José Luis Gómez as Juan
- Mª Rosa Salgado as Mª Rosa
- Norman Brisky as Andrés
- Lola Gaos as the nurse

== Release ==
The film screened at the 26th San Sebastián International Film Festival in September 1978. In 1979, a jury formed by the Madrid's Asociación de Productores Independientes, the Barcelona's Asociació de Productors de Catalunya and other producers selected the film to be the Spanish submission to the 51st Academy Awards.

== Accolades ==
Year	Award	Category	Nominee(s)	Result	Ref.
1978	26th San Sebastián International Film Festival	Silver Shell for Best Director	Manuel Gutiérrez Aragón	Won	

== See also ==
- List of Spanish films of 1978
- List of submissions to the 51st Academy Awards for Best Foreign Language Film
- List of Spanish submissions for the Academy Award for Best Foreign Language Film

== Bibliography ==
- Cerdán, Josetxo (1992). "Sonámbulos. Ana a través del espejo" (PDF). Vértigo. Revista de Cine (3). A Coruña: Ateneo da Coruña: 35–37. ISSN 1131-8023 – via Universitat Politècnica de València.
- Losilla, Carlos (11 April 2022). "Diccionario del cine español, 1950-1990 (12). Sonámbulos (1978), de Manuel Gutiérrez Aragón". Rinconete. ISSN 1885-5008 – via Biblioteca Virtual Miguel de Cervantes.
- Mira, Alberto (2010). The A to Z of Spanish Cinema. Lanham, Toronto, Plymouth: The Scarecrow Press, Inc. p. 155. ISBN 9780810876224.
