= Cabaret (1953 film) =

1953 film by Eduardo Manzanos

- Directed by: Eduardo Manzanos Brochero
- Written by: José Suárez Carreño; Eduardo Manzanos Brochero
- Starring: Fernando Rey; Nati Mistral; José Bódalo
- Cinematography: Manuel Berenguer
- Edited by: Antonio Gimeno
- Music by: Fernando García Morcillo
- Production companies: Intercontinental Films; Unión Films
- Release date: 23 March 1953
- Running time: 83 minutes
- Country: Spain
- Language: Spanish

Cabaret is a 1953 Spanish musical film directed by Eduardo Manzanos Brochero and starring Fernando Rey, Nati Mistral and José Bódalo.

== Synopsis ==
The film begins with a news item published in the newspapers announcing the investigation by the police of a major scam. Precisely, following in the footsteps of the author of that crime, we will discover the cabaret where the entire plot takes place. A place where the paths of a multitude of characters cross.

== Cast ==
- Fernando Rey
- Nati Mistral
- José Bódalo
- Félix Dafauce
- María Luz Galicia
- Rafael Romero Marchent
- Enrique Herreros
- Miguel Pastor
- José Luis Ozores
- Manuel San Román
- Matilde Muñoz Sampedro
- Rafael Alonso
- Mariano Ozores
- Luisa Puchol
- Pilar Vela

== Bibliography ==
- Pascual Cebollada. Biografía y películas de Fernando Rey. C.I.L.E.H., 1992.
