= El Crack (1981 film) =

- Theatrical release poster
- Directed by: José Luis Garci
- Written by: José Luis Garci; Horacio Valcárcel
- Produced by: José Luis Garci
- Starring: Alfredo Landa
- Cinematography: Manuel Rojas
- Edited by: Miguel González Sinde
- Music by: Jesús Gluck
- Production company: Nickel Odeon
- Distributed by: A Contracorriente films
- Release date: 6 April 1981
- Running time: 119 minutes
- Country: Spain
- Language: Spanish

El Crack (English: The Crack) is a 1981 Spanish crime drama film co-written and directed by José Luis Garci, starring Alfredo Landa. The plot was inspired by the novels written by Dashiell Hammett, to whom the film is dedicated. It is a detective film and basically a Spanish film noir. The story takes place in Madrid and New York City in December 1980.

== Plot ==
Germán Areta, a former police detective, runs his own private eye agency solving routine cases in Madrid. His main connection to the seedy underbelly of Madrid is his employee, a reformed delinquent named Cárdenas. Despite his tough-as-nails persona, Germán finds solace in a blossoming relationship with Carmen, a nurse he met while on physiotherapy. He also has a soft spot for her four-year-old daughter Maite, born from a former relationship with a married doctor. While still despondent over her breakup, Carmen clearly holds feelings for Germán and is appreciative of his support and patience.

Francisco Medina, a widower, hires Germán to find his daughter Isabel, who was seventeen when she ran away two years ago. Germán contacts her former boyfriend Nico, who reveals that she had become pregnant. Nico was supportive, but her father forced her to have an abortion in London. She disappeared immediately afterwards, and months later Nico learned she was working as a prostitute in a Madrid nightclub.

Germán follows Isabel's trail from the nightclub to a VIP escort pool run by Margarita "Mimí" de Torres, a luxury brothel madam. Germán questions Mimí, who denies knowing Isabel and becomes aggravated once he reveals the reason for his visit. Germán's former police superior warns him that higher instances are annoyed by his investigation, and admonishes him to drop it because Mimí caters to a wealthy and powerful clientele.

Germán learns that Francisco Medina is in a hospital ICU with a terminal illness. Faced with impending death, Francisco reveals his true goal to be seeing Isabel one final time. Germán chastises him for withholding the reason behind her estrangement, but keeps investigating.

Germán's former police colleague Alberto, now working in high-level private security, approaches him with a well-paid job offer. Germán knows this is conditional on ending the Medina investigation, and refuses the offer. Alberto responds with a thinly-veiled threat disguised as "friendly" advice.

Cárdenas points Germán to an apparent lead from bank computer databases: Isabel withdraws money from an office on a strict monthly basis, and is due for her next withdrawal the following day. Germán and Cárdenas stake out the bank until a woman resembling Isabel arrives. Unaware that Alberto surreptitiously observes the interchange, Germán tells the woman about her father's dying wish to see her. She responds that her father has been dead to her since the abortion. Germán now has the thankless task of informing the terminally-ill Fernando that his daughter is alive, but unwilling to see him. After Germán leaves, he commits suicide by disconnecting his life support.

The case is seemingly solved. However, while on a movie date with Carmen, Germán notices that a film publicity still in the movie theater is a reversed copy of the film poster. Something he had originally overlooked suddenly becomes relevant--namely, that Isabel's photo from her father (where she held a tennis racket) was also mirrored, hence she is left-handed. Thus, the obviously right-handed woman in the bank was not Isabel. He angrily fires Cárdenas, for aiding Alberto in the set-up in exchange for a payoff.

The next warning to Germán comes in the form of a bomb in his car, which kills Maite. This devastates Germán, but also strengthens his resolve. He ambushes Alberto, knocks him unconscious, straps a makeshift bomb to his stomach and forces him to confess everything. Alberto reveals that the girl died two years ago. He procured young girls through Mimí for Jesús María Jiménez Ziener, an important entrepreneur and financier he works for and, privately, a sexual sadist. Ziener inflicted irreversible injuries on Isabel, although it is unclear whether she died from them or was given a mercy killing by Alberto, who later threw the body inside the formwork of an under-construction bridge.

Germán forcefully enlists Alberto's help and follows him and Ziener to New York City. After killing Ziener in a restaurant restroom, Germán calls Alberto's hotel room from the airport. Knowing Alberto had at least a peripheral role in Maite's death, German tells him that the strapped bomb was fake. Alberto furiously removes the bandages and the bomb explodes, killing him instantly. Back in Madrid, Germán rekindles his relationship with Carmen.

== Cast ==
- Alfredo Landa as Germán Areta "El Piojo", a 43-year-old private detective and former 12-year veteran from the Police detective squad. In the best cinema-noir tradition, Germán is a smart, cold-blooded, hard-boiled man disenchanted of his lonely life and dirty work. It is implied that he quit the police force after being wounded while on duty and undergoing physiotherapy rehabilitation.
- María Casanova as Carmen, a nurse who helped Germán during physiotherapy. Their burgeoning relationship, and Germán's fondness for her daughter Maite, constitute the only instances of real happiness in his life.
- Manuel Tejada as Alberto "El Guapo", a corrupt ex-cop with a penchant for sartorial elegance who works for a holding company, and one of the film's main antagonists.
- Miguel Rellán as Cárdenas "El Moro", Germán's "jack-of-all-trades" employee, a talkative man whom Germán had arrested and later freed for car theft during his time as a police detective.
- Manuel Lorenzo as Rocky, Germán's friend, regular barber and mus companion who entertains him with his love for boxing and his multiple (and apocryphal) tales of trips to the United States.
- Raúl Fraire as Francisco Medina, a widower from Ponferrada whose search for his missing daughter kickstarts the plot.
- José Bódalo as Don Ricardo "El Abuelo", a police commissioner and Germán's former superior in the force.
- Mónica Emilió Prieto as Maite, Carmen's four-year-old daughter.
- Mayrata O'Wisiedo as Mimí de Torres, a well-connected luxury brothel madam.
- Francisco Vidal as Nico, Isabel's boyfriend during her stint in university and now a Cadena SER shock jock.
- José Manuel Cervino as Vareta, a petty robber unfortunate enough to cross Germán's path.

== Production ==
The film was produced in Spain in 1981 by Nickel Odeon Dos and Acuarius Films, with distribution by A Contracorriente Films. It runs for 119 minutes. The screenplay was co‑written by José Luis Garci and Horacio Valcárcel, with music composed by Jesús Gluck, cinematography by Manuel Rojas, and editing by Miguel González Sinde.

== Reception ==
El Crack won two CEC Awards, for Best Actor (Landa) and Best Screenplay (Garci).
