= Las verdes praderas =

- Theatrical release poster
- Directed by: José Luis Garci
- Written by: José Luis Garci; José María González Sinde
- Produced by: José Luis Tafur
- Starring: Alfredo Landa; María Casanova; Carlos Larrañaga; Ángel Picazo; Irene Gutiérrez Caba
- Cinematography: Fernando Arribas
- Edited by: Miguel González Sinde
- Music by: Ludwig van Beethoven
- Production company: José Luis Tafur PC
- Release date: 26 March 1979
- Running time: 100 minutes
- Country: Spain
- Language: Spanish

Las verdes praderas (English: The Green Meadows) is a 1979 Spanish film written and directed by José Luis Garci, starring Alfredo Landa.

== Plot ==
José Rebolledo is a man of humble origins who has a good job at an advertising company and sincerely loves his wife, Conchi. The couple has two children and they all seem the perfect family. Without financial problems they can afford some quirks and have acquired a chalet in the Sierra de Guadarrama where they spend weekends in the company of family and upper class friends, playing sports and having barbecues. However, for José, within this apparent happiness lies a deep sense of frustration with the lifestyle he has chosen. José finds himself out of place in this bourgeois life.

== Cast ==
- Alfredo Landa - José Rebolledo
- María Casanova - Conchi
- Carlos Larrañaga - Ricardo
- Pedro Díez del Corral - Alberto
- Cecilia Roth - Matilde
- Norma Aleandro - Fidela

== DVD release ==
Las verdes praderas is available in Region 2 DVD in Spanish only. It was released on DVD in 2009.
