= Theatre Kursaal-Fernando Arrabal =

Theatre in Melilla, Spain

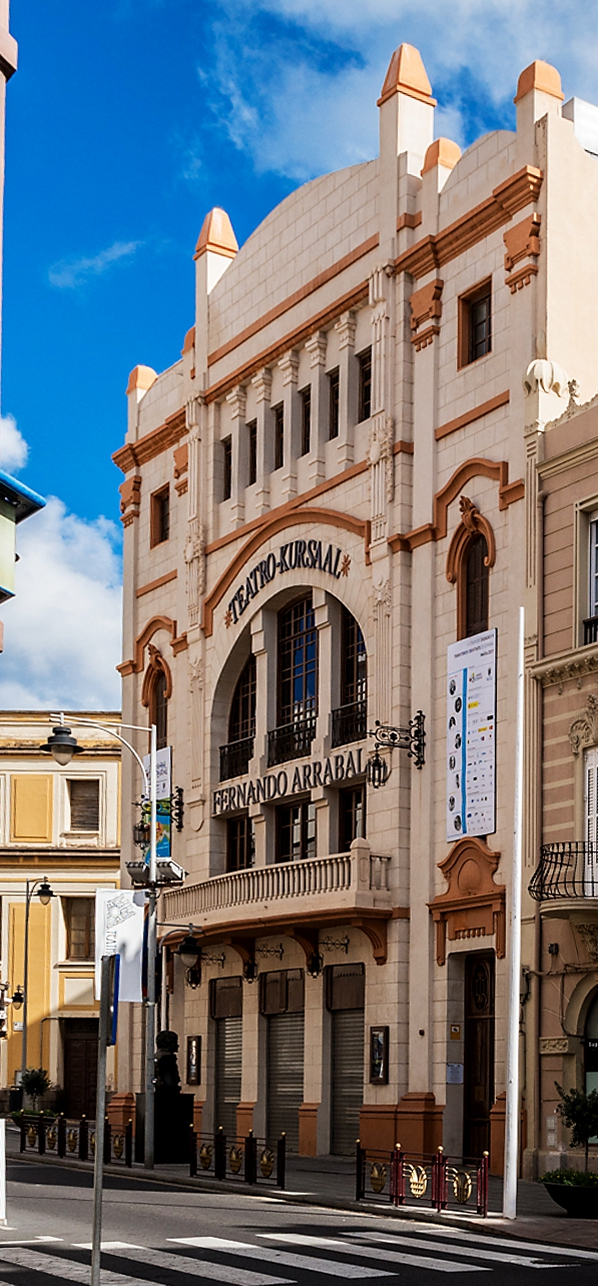
- Exterior of venue
- Interactive map of Theatre Kursaal-Fernando Arrabal
- Address: Candido Lobera, 6 Melilla; Spain
- Coordinates: 35°17′38″N 02°56′22″W
- Capacity: 766

Construction
- Opened: 1930; 96 years ago (original structure)
- Rebuilt: 2011

The Theatre Kursaal-Fernando Arrabal is the most important theatre in Melilla (Spain), located at number 6 on Cándido Lobera Girela Avenue, Modernist Extension and is part of the Historic-Artistic Complex of the City of Melilla, a Property of Cultural Interest. It is the main venue of the Melilla Film Week.

== History ==
On February 20, 1930, the Municipal Board authorized its construction to Rico Albert, indicating that it should be aligned with the Chamber of Commerce Building and fully comply with the conditions imposed by the Melilla Entertainment Commission. It was built in 1930 by the contractors José Zea, Albadelajo and Martínez Rosas, SA, with decoration by Vicente Maeso and carpentry by Adolfo Hernández according to a design by the architect Enrique Nieto dated December 1929 and inaugurated on October 31, 1930, two thousand five hundred spectators, on April 14, 1931, the beginning of its sound film sessions took place with the German film titled in Spanish Sólo te he querido a ti, being declared a new work that year and expanded between 1934 and 1935 with proscenium and dressing rooms by the same architect in November 1934, to serve as a theater, the only one in the center of Melilla

It was renamed Cine Nacional in 1937 and suffered the loss of the original decoration of the room in 1952 and 1953, replaced by one by Pedro Aroca, of the pinnacles of the main façade after several earthquakes between 1958 and 1959 and the elimination of the boxes of the progenium in 1969 to enlarge the screen. After the closure in 1982 of the Monumental Cinema Sport it became the largest cinema in Melilla, where the Melilla Film Weeks were held.

It was bought in 2005 and rebuilt between 2010 and 2011 by the Autonomous City of Melilla, being called Teatro Kursaal.

== Description ==
It is built with masonry walls of local stone and brick, with brick vaults for the ceilings, very humble materials.

== Exterior ==
The main façade has a street that begins with three entrance doors with flat arches, continuing with a triple window that leads to a continuous balcony with a baluster. This window continues with another similar one, with a segmental arch above the cast iron sign, framed by a cornice adapted to the arch that leads to five lintelled windows, separated by pilasters that lead to a curved pediment, flanked by pinnacles that start in beautiful pillars decorated with geometric motifs that begin in the first body. The side streets have beautiful wooden doors, with mouldings that lead to a large window finished in an arch, Sevillian iron letters that lead to another cornice adapted to the arch and this to a window, topped with another curved pediment and flanked by the entire street with pilasters, repeating this composition of the street in the panels of the side façade.

== Interior ==
Before the transformation it had three floors -800 and 400 seats-.

The ground floor had the ticket offices on the sides of the hall, behind which there is the patio, with a proscenium and orchestra at its end. The first floor had a foyer, the services and, separated by central railings, the <<eye of the patio>> that will offer the view of the hall on the ground floor, until the construction of the stage with the cabin and side entrances to the amphitheater that had the boxes in its outer arms. The second amphitheater, with the same layout, will house the accounting office and will end, in its central area, the view of the lower foyer.
