= The Grandfather (1998 film) =

El abuelo
- Theatrical release poster
- Directed by: José Luis Garci
- Written by: José Luis Garci; Horacio Valcárcel
- Produced by: José Luis Garci
- Starring: Fernando Fernán-Gómez; Rafael Alonso; Cayetana Guillén Cuervo; Agustín González
- Cinematography: Raúl Pérez Cubero
- Edited by: Miguel González Sinde
- Music by: Manuel Balboa
- Distributed by: Columbia TriStar Films de España
- Release date: 30 October 1998
- Running time: 151 minutes
- Country: Spain
- Language: Spanish

The Grandfather (Spanish: El abuelo) is a 1998 Spanish drama film written, produced and directed by José Luis Garci. It stars Fernando Fernán-Gómez, Cayetana Guillén Cuervo and Rafael Alonso. The film, an adaptation of the novel of the same title by Benito Pérez Galdós, tells the story of an aristocrat's search to discover which of his two putative granddaughters resulted from an extramarital affair by his daughter-in-law.

The film was an Academy Award nominee for Best Foreign Language Film at the 71st Academy Awards.

== Plot ==
Don Rodrigo, Count of Albrit, an old Spanish aristocrat, returns to turn-of-the-20th-century Spain after losing his fortune in America. The death of his only son has compelled him to come back to his family estate, now in possession of his daughter-in-law Lucrecia. Upon his return, Don Rodrigo is pleased to meet his granddaughters, Dolly and Nelly, both of whom are adorable and attentive towards him. However, something nags at Don Rodrigo.

His son died heartbroken after discovering his wife was having an affair with a Parisian painter, leaving a letter stating that one of the girls is an illegitimate child, not of his blood, and therefore not entitled to be his true heir or successor to his name and country estate. To the Count of Albrit, it is a matter of honor to know which of the girls is his real granddaughter. To uncover the truth, he confronts his son's widow, Lucrecia.

Lucrecia, now 32, is an English-born beauty with a scandalous reputation, who married the Count’s son when she was 18 and was unfaithful to her husband during their marriage, having an affair with a Parisian painter. Confronting her, the Count of Albrit, who opposed the match, tells her she killed his son, who died of sadness, loneliness, and shame brought on by her infidelity. Lucrecia replies that life is complicated, as are the emotions between men and women. In any case, she vehemently refuses to discuss her daughter’s paternity.

Lucrecia is well-connected. Her latest liaison with Jaime, a government minister, has benefited the village in which her lands lie. When she sees her family relationships and a future move from the provinces to Madrid threatened, she tries to use her standing with the town’s authorities and the local clergy to thwart the old man in his quest. Their plan is to have the Count of Albrit confined to a nearby monastery, but the still-formidable Don Rodrigo quickly realizes their intentions and manages to escape their trap. He reminds some of the smarmy villagers of their checkered past when the Count of Albrit was a power to be reckoned with.

During his quest to find the true origin of his granddaughters, the Count of Albrit befriends the girls' teacher, poor old Pío Coronado. Too kind for his own good and saddled with six unseen but abusive and sluttish daughters, Coronado would like to kill himself, but he lacks the courage. The straightforward Count tells the tutor that he will be only too happy to toss him off a cliff into the sea whenever Coronado is ready.

In the meantime, Senén, a mercenary servant, offers an incriminating love letter for sale. The letter implies that Dolly, the eldest of the two girls, who has always forcefully defended the well-being of her grandfather, is the legitimate child. With this piece of information, Don Rodrigo confronts his daughter-in-law once again. He asks her to allow him to live with Dolly on the family rural estate, but Lucrecia refuses to be parted from any of her daughters without admitting the truth about Dolly’s paternity. Soon after, Lucrecia’s confessor reveals to Don Rodrigo that he has been in the wrong. Nelly is his biological granddaughter. Finally reconciling with the Count of Albrit, Lucrecia leaves for Madrid with Nelly. Dolly stays behind with Don Rodrigo, who has his wishes fulfilled. Pio Coronado buries his suicidal intentions.

== Cast ==
- Fernando Fernán-Gómez as Don Rodrigo, Count of Albrit
- Rafael Alonso as Pio Coronado
- Cayetana Guillén Cuervo as Lucrecia
- Agustín González as Senén
- Cristina Cruz Mínguez as Dolly
- Alicia Rosas as Nelly
- Fernando Guillén as the Major
- Francisco Algora as the priest
- Antonio Valero as Jaime

== Reception ==
=== Critical response ===
The Grandfather has an approval rating of 57% on review aggregator website Rotten Tomatoes, based on 14 reviews, and an average rating of 6.7/10. Metacritic assigned the film a weighted average score of 57 out of 100, based on 15 critics, indicating "mixed or average reviews".

=== Awards and nominations ===
The film was an Academy Award nominee for Best Foreign Language Film. Fernando Fernán-Gómez won the Goya Award for Best Actor. There was a controversy that year between Garci and Goyas, in which the latter accused Garci of buying votes for the film. As a result, Garci quit the Spanish Academy. The accusations were denied later by the own Academy.

== Alternate versions ==
The film was initially filmed as a television miniseries for Televisión Española and was edited with a shorter cut for its release in cinemas as a film. The miniseries was broadcast on La Primera Cadena of Televisión Española in 2001.

In 1972, Rafael Gil made a previous version titled La duda.

== DVD release ==
The film was released on DVD in the United States on August 8, 2000 by Miramax Home Entertainment.

== See also ==
- List of submissions to the 71st Academy Awards for Best Foreign Language Film
- List of Spanish submissions for the Academy Award for Best Foreign Language Film
