= The Nest (1980 film) =

El Nido
- Theatrical release poster
- Directed by: Jaime de Armiñán
- Written by: Jaime de Armiñán
- Starring: Héctor Alterio; Ana Torrent
- Cinematography: Teodoro Escamilla
- Edited by: José Luis Matesanz
- Music by: Alejandro Massó
- Release date: 18 September 1980
- Running time: 97 minutes
- Country: Spain
- Language: Spanish

The Nest (Spanish: El Nido) is a 1980 Spanish drama film written and directed by Jaime de Armiñán, starring Héctor Alterio and Ana Torrent. The plot follows the emotionally intense relationship between an old widower and a precocious thirteen-year-old girl. The film was nominated for the Academy Award for Best Foreign Language Film at the 53rd Academy Awards.

== Plot ==
In a small village near Salamanca, Don Alejandro, a wealthy widower in his sixties, leads a solitary life, finding solace in music, chess, and hunting. His routine is disrupted when he encounters Goyita, a precocious 13-year-old. As they share walks, horseback rides, and dinners, Alejandro experiences a resurgence of vitality, his first since his wife's death. Goyita, seeking validation and affection, yearns for Alejandro to regard her as a mature woman and confess his feelings for her. Yet, Alejandro treasures their platonic companionship, which has rekindled his spirit, and grapples with the prospect of falling in love with someone so young.

== Cast ==
- Héctor Alterio as Don Alejandro
- Ana Torrent as Goyita
- Luis Politti as Don Eladio
- Agustín González as Sargento
- Patricia Adriani as Marisa
- María Luisa Ponte as Amparo
- Mercedes Alonso as Mercedes
- Luisa Rodrigo as Gumer
- Amparo Baró as Fuen
- Ovidi Montllor as Manuel

== See also ==
- List of submissions to the 53rd Academy Awards for Best Foreign Language Film
- List of Spanish submissions for the Academy Award for Best Foreign Language Film
