= Tres eran tres (TV series) =

1972–73 Spanish television series

Tres eran tres is a Spanish television series which was broadcast on Televisión Española from 1972 to 1973. It was written and directed by Jaime de Armiñán.

== Plot ==
Elena, Paloma and Julia are three sisters who, nevertheless, have lived in separate homes and barely know each other. Their parents broke up when they were children, and Elena stayed with her mother, Paloma with her father, and Julia was sent to a boarding school abroad. Due to some circumstances, the three, already adult, meet to live together in Elena's house, and the series reflects their disagreements, their fights, reconciliations, frustrations and dreams.

== Cast ==
- Amparo Soler Leal, Elena
- Julieta Serrano, Paloma
- Emma Cohen, Julia
- Lola Gaos, Fuencisla
- Charo López, María
- Yolanda Ríos, Alicia
- José Vivó, Carrasco
- Joaquín Roa, Father

== Awards ==
- TP de Oro (1973): Emma Cohen as Best national actress
