= Unfinished Business (1977 film) =

Asignatura pendiente
- Theatrical release poster
- Directed by: José Luis Garci
- Written by: José Luis Garci; José María González Sinde
- Produced by: José Luis Tafur
- Starring: José Sacristán; Fiorella Faltoyano
- Cinematography: Manuel Rojas
- Edited by: Miguel González Sinde
- Release date: 20 April 1977 (Spain)
- Running time: 109 minutes
- Country: Spain
- Language: Spanish

Asignatura pendiente (English: Unfinished Business) is a 1977 Spanish drama film co-written and directed by José Luis Garci.

The film was one of the most successful films in the 1970s with 2,305,924 admissions. It was the highest-grossing Spanish film in 1977 grossing 193 million pesetas ($2.5 million).

Nowadays, it is viewed as a portrayal of society during the Spanish transition to democracy.

== Plot summary ==
José and Elena were friends. They share everything, except for some unfinished business: sex. Now, with the return of democracy to the country, both have remained friends, but married to other people, and now become lovers. José is involved in politics.

== Cast ==
- José Sacristán (José)
- Fiorella Faltoyano (Elena)
- Antonio Gamero
- Silvia Tortosa
- Héctor Alterio
- Simón Andreu (Paco)
- María Casanova (Pili)

== Songs ==
Two songs are emblematic in the film: Mikis Theodorakis's Honeymoon song by Gloria Lasso, and 15 años tiene mi amor (My love is 15 years old) by Duo Dinamico.
