= Encarna Paso =

Spanish actress (1929–2019)

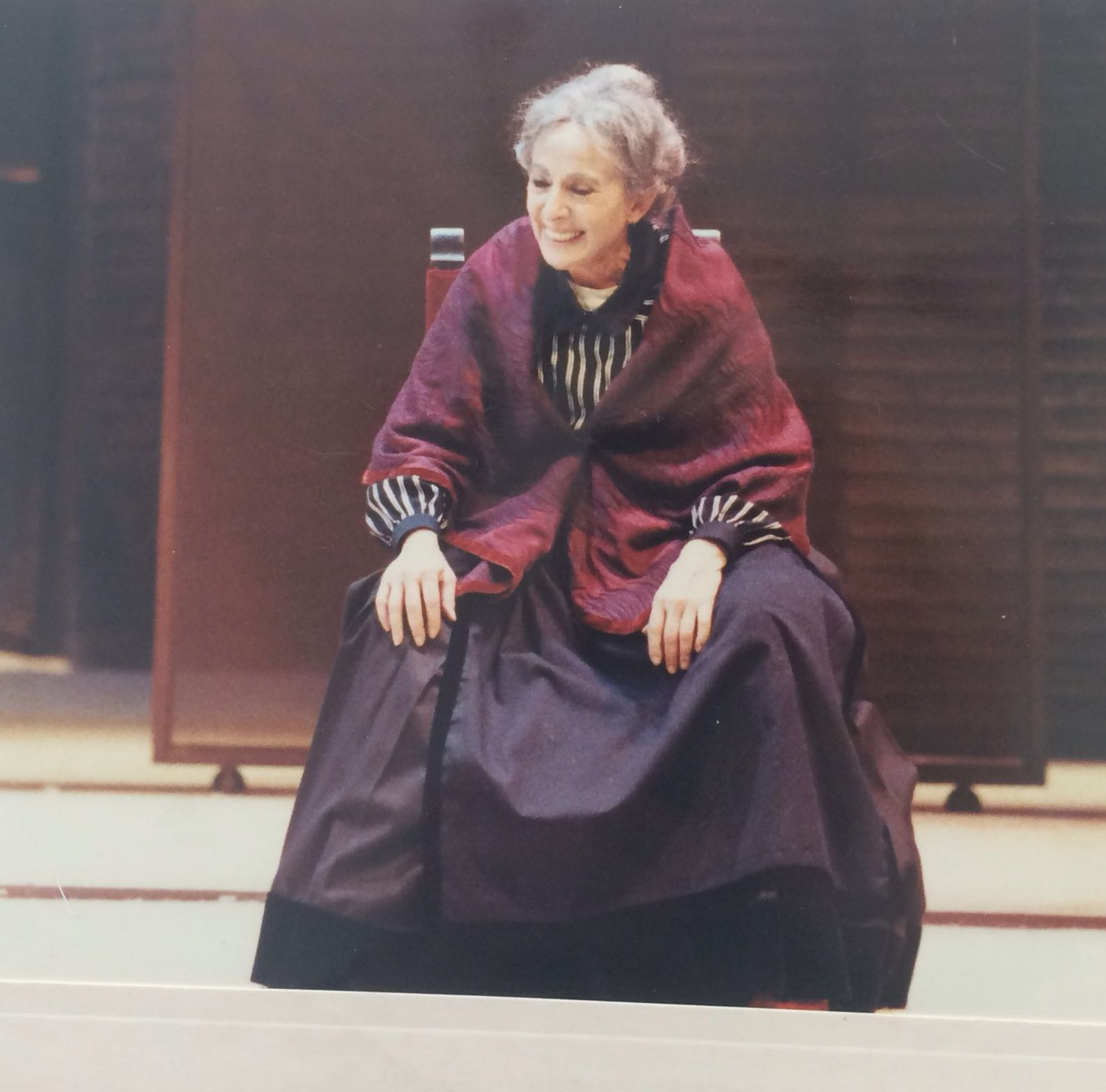
- Paso in 2016
- Born: María de la Encarnación Paso Ramos; 25 March 1931; Madrid, Spain
- Died: 18 August 2019 (aged 88); Madrid, Spain
- Occupation: Actress
- Years active: 1948–2019

María de la Encarnación Paso Ramos (25 March 1929 – 18 August 2019), better known as Encarna Paso, was a Spanish film and television actress.

== Biography ==
Daughter of playwright Antonio Paso Díaz, granddaughter of Antonio Paso y Cano and niece granddaughter of Manuel Paso Cano, niece of Enrique Paso, Manuel Paso and Alfonso Paso, also playwrights, and actresses Mercedes Paso, Maruja Paso, Elisa Paso and Soledad Paso. Mother of actor Juan Calot (together with the late actress Yolanda Ríos) and Patricia Calot, dedicated to cultural management. Grandmother of the actors Alicia Calot and Edgar Calot.

She died on 18 August 2019 in Madrid at the age of 88 from pneumonia.

== Selected filmography ==
- The Curious Impertinent (1953)
- Queen of The Chantecler (1962)
- The Mustard Grain (1962)
- The Glass Ceiling (1971)
- Retrato de Familia (1976)
- Begin the Beguine (1982), first Spanish film to win an Academy Award.
- La colmena (1982)
- Sesión continua (1984)

== Bibliography ==
- Ronald Schwartz. Great Spanish Films Since 1950. Scarecrow Press, 2008.
