= Begin the Beguine (film) =

Volver a empezar
- Film poster
- Directed by: José Luis Garci
- Written by: José Luis Garci; Ángel Llorente
- Produced by: José Luis Garci
- Starring: Antonio Ferrandis; Encarna Paso
- Cinematography: Manuel Rojas
- Edited by: Miguel González Sinde
- Music by: Johann Pachelbel; Cole Porter
- Production company: Nickel Odeon
- Release date: 29 March 1982; (Spain)
- Running time: 87 minutes
- Country: Spain
- Language: Spanish
- Box office: ESP 190,713,512 (Spain)

Begin the Beguine (Spanish: Volver a empezar) is a 1982 Spanish film written and directed by José Luis Garci, starring Antonio Ferrandis. The plot follows the story of a Spaniard who returns to his homeland after many years in exile when he wins the Nobel Prize in Literature. Its original Spanish title, Volver a Empezar, means Starting Again.

The film won the Academy Award for Best Foreign Language Film at the 55th Academy Awards, and was the first Spanish film to do so.

== Plot ==
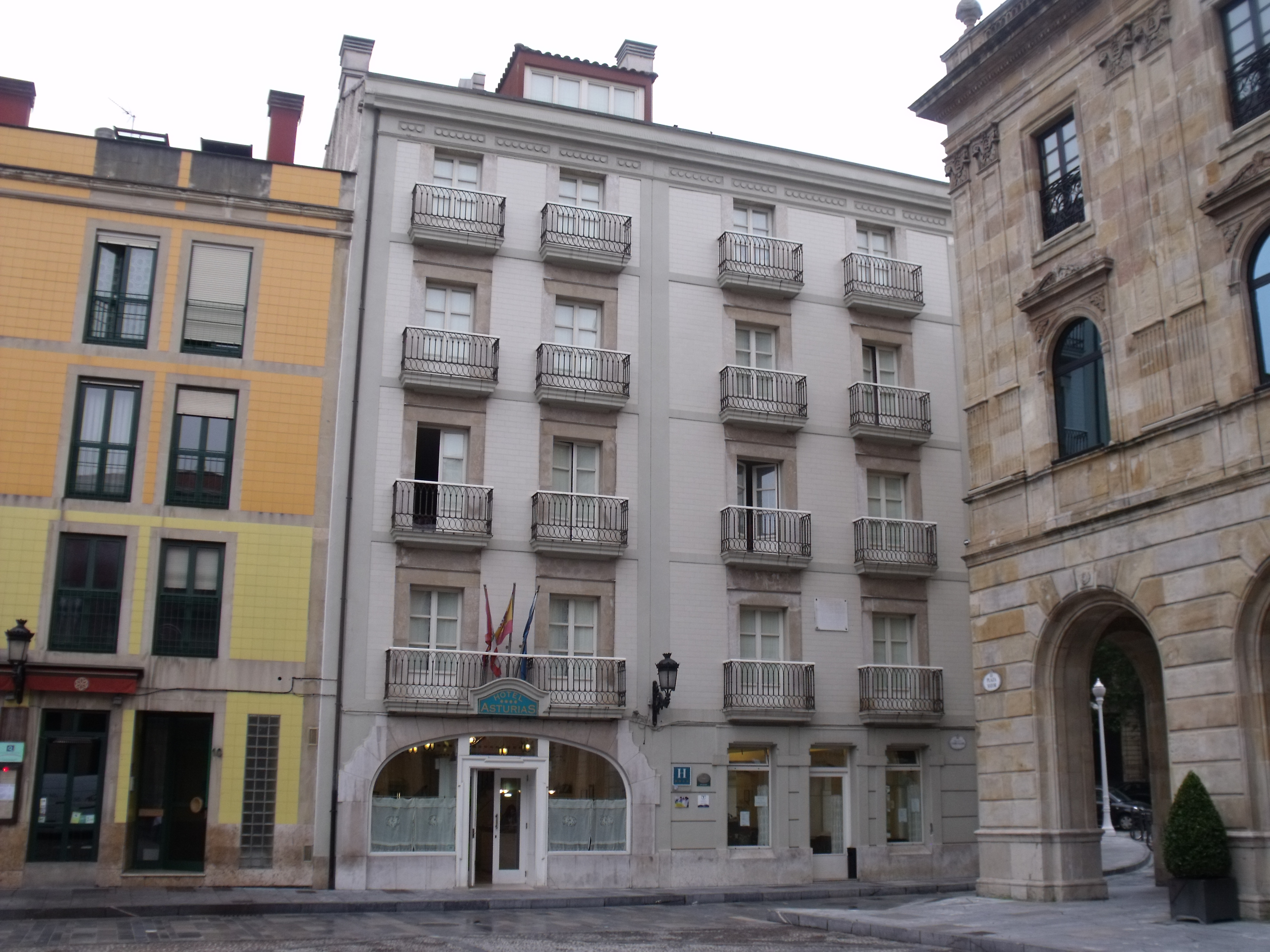
At Gijón, Albajara stays at a hotel and interacts with the workers. The hotel scenes were shot at the Hotel Asturias, shown here in 2013.

In 1981, the famous writer Antonio Albajara (Antonio Ferrandis) arrives at Gijón, his hometown, from Stockholm, where he has just received the Nobel Prize in Literature. For forty years, Albajara has been a professor of medieval literature at the University of California, Berkeley. He has alternated his teaching with the literary production that has given him worldwide fame. In Gijón, Antonio is reunited with Elena, his first and great love, before he was forced to his exile in 1937 Civil War. However, this visit is not definitive because a serious and deadly disease affects the writer.

== Cast ==
- Antonio Ferrandis - Antonio Albajara
- Encarna Paso - Elena
- Agustín González - Gervasio Losada
- José Bódalo - Roxu
- Marta Fernández Muro - Carolina
- Pablo Hoyos - Ernesto

== Awards ==
- Academy Award for Best Foreign Language Film (1983)
- Prize of the Ecumenical Jury at the Montreal Film Festival (1982)

== See also ==
- List of submissions to the 55th Academy Awards for Best Foreign Language Film
- List of Spanish submissions for the Academy Award for Best Foreign Language Film
