= José Luis Garci =

Spanish film director

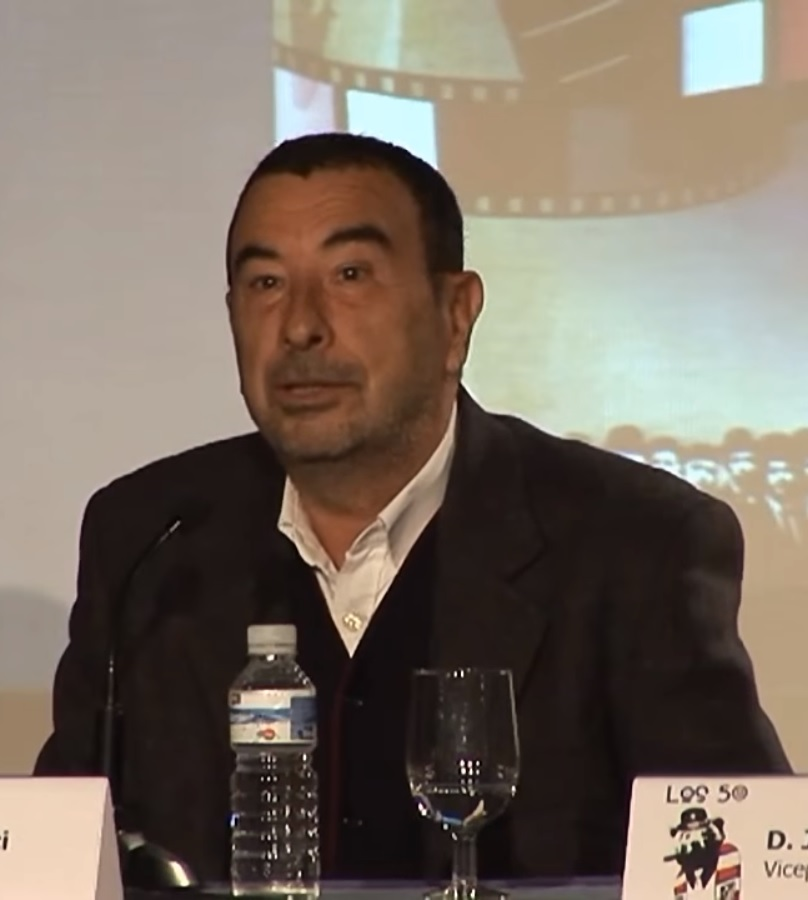
- Garci in 2013
- Born: José Luis García Muñoz; 20 January 1944 (age 82); Madrid, Spain
- Occupations: Film director; screenwriter; producer; critic; TV presenter; author
- Years active: 1977–present
- Spouse: Andrea Tenuta (m. 2004)

José Luis García Muñoz (born 20 January 1944), known professionally as José Luis Garci, is a Spanish film director, producer, critic, TV presenter, screenwriter and author. One of the most influential film personalities in the history of film in Spain, he earned worldwide acclaim and his country's first Best Foreign Language Film Academy Award for Begin the Beguine (1982). Four of his films, including also Sesión continua (1984), Asignatura aprobada (1987) and El abuelo (1998), have been nominated for the Academy Award for Best Foreign Language Film, more than any other Spanish director. His films are characterized for his classical style and the underlying sentimentality of their plots.

== Early life and work ==
Born in 1944 in a humble family from Asturias. After completing a pre-university course, Garci began working as an administrative assistant in a bank. His love for cinema from an early age led him to pursue filmmaking as a career. At age twenty he began writing reviews for a number of film magazines such as Signos and Cinestudio, winning an award in 1968 from the Circulo de Escritores Cinematograficos for his work as film critic.

In 1969 he became involved in scriptwriting, receiving his first screen credits for Antonio Giménez Rico El Cronicón (The Chronicle, 1970). Between 1972 and 1977 he scripted five more films: León Klimovsky's La casa de las chivas (The House of the goats); Pedro Olea's No es bueno que el hombre esté solo (A Man Shouldn't be Alone, 1973); Eloy de la Iglesia's Una gota de sangre para morir amando, (A drop of blood to die loving, 1973); Antonio Drove's Mi mujer es muy decente dentro de lo que cabe (1974) or Roberto Bodegas' Vida conyugal sana (Healthy Married Life, 1973) and Los nuevos españoles (New Spaniards, 1974). During this same period, Garci also wrote the made for T.V film La Cabina (The Telephone Box, 1972) directed by Antonio Mercero. He then directed his first short films: !Al Futbol! (!To Football!) Mi Marilyn (My Marilyn), both in 1975, and Tiempo de gente acobardada (People Cowed Time, 1976).

At the same time, he wrote his first literary works, science fiction stories like: Bibidibabibidibú (1970), Adam Blake (1972), and La Gioconda está triste y otras extrañas historias (1976). He also published the essay: Ray Bradbury humanista del futuro (1971). In 1981 he obtained the Puerta de Oro Prize for his story Los mejores años de nuestra vida.

== Feature films ==
In 1977, José Luis Garci directed his first feature film Asignatura pendiente (Unfinished Business) from a script by Gonzalez Sinde, a love story between an old pair of lovers which runs parallel to the social and political changes lived in Spain after the fall of Francisco Franco's regime. The film was well received by critics and audiences, becoming the most successful representative of the Spanish film of the generation of the Transition from dictatorship to democracy who saw themselves in a social and political limbo. A simple story of an amorous seduction by the film's hero is set around a series of topical references to a generation of Spaniards born in the immediate post-civil war period whose frustrations and nostalgia are embodied in the film's protagonist. Garci took his narrative cues from the visual patterns followed in the traditional Hollywood narrative.

Garci second film Solos en la madrugada (Alone in the Dark, 1978) became skilled tackling progressive social themes intended for an audience interested neither in elite art cinema nor in the popular style of most Spanish comedies. He used this same pattern in his third film, Las verdes praderas (The Green Meadows, 1979), in which heavy sentimentality, a constant in his films, became more apparent.

After founding the production company Nickel Odeon with José Esteban Alenda in 1980, the director changed gears with El Crack (1981), in which he used the figure of the hard boiled detective in a story inspired by the novels of Dashiell Hammett, to whom the film is dedicated, and employing elements of the American film noirs of the 1930s and 40s giving it a Spanish flavor. For this film Garci won the CEC Award for Best Screenplay from the Círculo de Escritores Cinematográficos. The formula worked so well that two years later he made a sequel, El crack II (1983).

Between this two films, Garci made his most emblematic work Volver a empezar, (Begin to Beguine, 1982), a sentimental story of an aging writer who returns to Spain after many years in exiled following the civil war. The film was the first Spanish motion picture to win the Academy Award for Best Foreign Language Film.

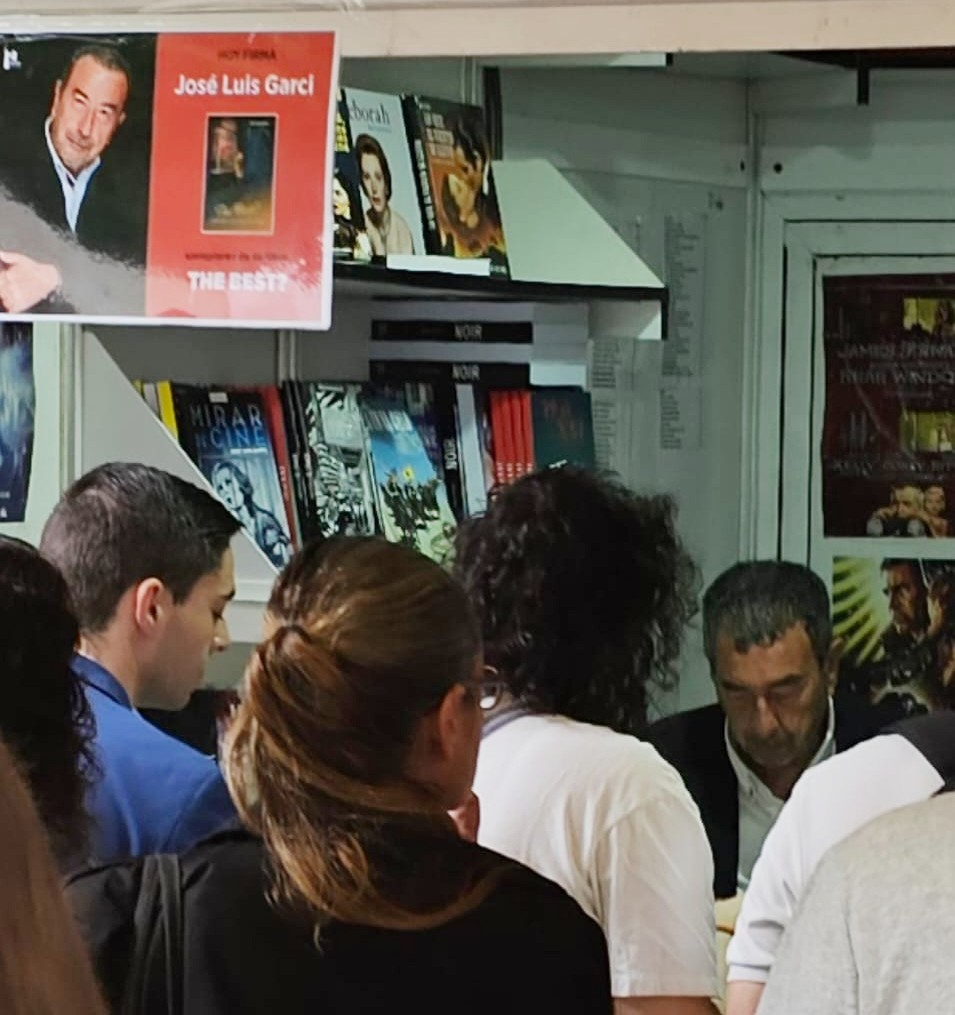
Garci signing books at the Madrid Book Fair in 2024

His films Sesión continua (Double Feature, 1984) and Asignatura aprobada (Course Completed, 1987), which also received Academy Award nominations, gave emphasis to sentimentality. He won the Goya Award for Best Director for Asigantura aprobada in 1988. Canción de cuna (Cradle Song, 1994), a film adaptation of Gregorio Martinez Sierra play, was awarded with the Prize of the Ecumenical Jury at the 18th Montreal World Film Festival. Garci's subsequently films include La herida luminosa (The Wound of Light, 1997), and El abuelo (The Grandfather, 1998), which was Spain's submission for the Best Foreign Film category of the Academy Awards in 1999, getting the final nomination.

Recently, Garci directed Una historia de entonces (You're the One, 2000), which was entered into the 51st Berlin International Film Festival, Historia de un beso (Story of a Kiss, 2002), Tiovivo c. 1950 (2004), Ninette (2005), Luz de domingo (2007), Sangre de mayo (2008), Holmes & Watson. Madrid Days (2012), and the prequel El crack cero (2019), the third part of the crime film saga El crack. In addition to filmmaking, he is a popular television presenter in his homeland. His television program ¡Qué grande es el cine!, which was broadcast on Televisión Española between 1995 and 2005 on the occasion of the first centenary of the history of cinema, presented a feature film weekly and was attended by three experts, who debated after the screening of the chosen film.

== Style ==
Garci does not have a computer, but writes all his scripts by hand or on an Olympia brand typewriter. When writing a collaborative script, Garci can base it on his own idea or that of the other scriptwriter, providing mutual feedback with ideas, characters and scenes until reaching the final result. In his films his preference for the shot and sequence stands out and are usually divided into two stages, one that goes from Asignatura pendiente (1977) to Asignatura aprobada (1987), another that begins with Canción de cuna (1994) and extends until El crack cero (2019). In its first stage, Garci places the action in the present or in the immediate past, showing throughout the film the social and political changes that occur at that moment, while in the second stage it focuses on showing the past in an attempt to understand the present.

== Personal life ==
Garci maintained a long-time relationship with Ana Rosa Quintana. In 1998 he began a relationship with Cayetana Guillén Cuervo, whom he met during the filming of El abuelo. Since June 10, 2004, he has been married to the Uruguayan actress Andrea Tenuta.

A fan of football, he is a follower of Atlético de Madrid and Real Sporting de Gijón, of which he was a director for more than three years.

== Filmography ==
=== Film ===
Year	Title	Director	Writer	Producer	Editor	Notes
1977	Asignatura Pendiente	Yes	Yes	No	No	
1978	Alone in the Dark	Yes	Yes	No	No	
1979	Las verdes praderas	Yes	Yes	No	No	
1980	Viva la Clase Media	No	Yes	Yes	No	
1981	El Crack	Yes	Yes	Yes	No	
1982	Volver a Empezar	Yes	Yes	Yes	No	Academy Award Best Foreign Language Film winner, 1982
1983	El Crack II	Yes	Yes	No	No	
1985	Bras Fe Fer	No	No	Executive	Yes	
1984	Sesión continua	Yes	Yes	Yes	No	Academy Award Best Foreign Language Film nominee
1987	Asignatura Aprobada	Yes	Yes	Yes	No	Academy Award Best Foreign Language Film nominee
1988	El Tesoro	No	Yes	Executive	No	
1994	Canción de cuna	Yes	Yes	Yes	Yes	
1997	La herida luminosa	Yes	Yes	Yes	No	
1998	El Abuelo	Yes	Yes	Yes	No	Academy Award Best Foreign Language Film nominee
2000	Una historia de entonces	Yes	Yes	Yes	No	European Film Academy Best European Director nominee
2002	Historia de un beso	Yes	Yes	Yes	Yes	
2003	Hotel Danubio	No	No	Yes	Yes	
2004	Tiovivo c. 1950	Yes	Yes	Yes	Yes	
2005	Ninette	Yes	Yes	Yes	No	
2007	Luz de Domingo	Yes	Yes	Yes	Yes	
2008	Sangre de Mayo	Yes	Yes	Yes	Yes	
2012	Holmes & Watson. Madrid Days	Yes	Yes	Yes	Yes	
2019	El Crack Cero	Yes	Yes	Yes	Yes	

==== Writer only ====
Year	Title	Notes
1966	Las últimas horas	Uncredited
1967	Los chicos de Peru	
1969	Las nenas del mini-mini	Uncredited
1970	El Cronicón	
1972	La casa de las chivas	
1973	No es bueno que el hombre esté solo	
1973	Una gota de sangre para morir amando	
1973	Ceremonia sangrienta	Uncredited
1974	Vida conyugal sana	
1974	Los nuevos españoles	
1975	Mi mujer es muy decente, dentro de lo que cabe	
1975	La mujer es cosa de hombres	
1976	La noche de los cien pajaros	
1998	Yerma	

==== Producer only ====
Year	Title	Notes
1985	Extramuros	
1986	La gran comedia	
1987	¡Biba la banda!	
1989	El río que nos lleva	Executive producer
1992	Las cadenas del deseo	
1995	Elisa, de Jean Backer	
1997	La furia	Associate producer
1997	Momentos robados	
1999	La venganza	Associate producer
1999	Un homo perbene	
1999	Shacky Carmine	
2000	Cóndor cux	
2000	Yoyes	Executive producer
2000	Érase otra vez	
2000	Leo	
2002	Nowhere	
2003	La gran aventura de Mortadelo y Filemón	Uncredited

== Awards and nominations ==
=== Academy Awards ===
Year	Category	Film	Result
1983	Best Foreign Language Film	Volver a empezar	Won
1985	Best Foreign Language Film	Sesión continua	Nominated
1988	Best Foreign Language Film	Asignatura aprobada	Nominated
1999	Best Foreign Language Film	El abuelo	Nominated

=== Goya Awards ===
Year	Award	Film	Result
1988	Best Director	Asignatura aprobada	Won
1995	Best Adapted Screenplay	Canción de cuna	Nominated
1995	Best Director	Canción de cuna	Nominated
1999	Best Adapted Screenplay	El abuelo	Nominated
2001	Best Director	You're the One	Nominated
2001	Best Adapted Screenplay	You're the One	Nominated
2006	Best Adapted Screenplay	Ninette	Nominated

=== Berlin International Film Festival ===
Year	Category	Film	Result
2000	Golden Bear	You're the One	Nominated

=== Montreal World Film Festival ===
Year	Category	Film	Result
1982	Prize of the Ecumenical Jury	Volver a empezar	Won
1994	Prize of the Ecumenical Jury - Special Mention	Canción de cuna	Won
1994	Best Director	Canción de cuna	Won
1994	Special Grand Prize of the Jury	Canción de cuna	Won
1997	Grand prix des amériques	La herida luminosa	Nominated

=== Chicago International Film Festival ===
Year	Category	Film	Result
1999	Gold Hugo	El abuelo	Nominated

=== Cartagena Film Festival ===
Year	Category	Film	Result
2002	Golden India Catalina for Best Director	You're the One	Won
2002	Golden India Catalina for Best Film	You're the One	Nominated

=== Toulouse Spanish Film Festival ===
Year	Category	Film	Result
2020	Audience Award	El crack cero	Won
2020	Golden Violet	El crack cero	Nominated

=== Argentine Film Critics Association ===
Year	Category	Film	Result
2002	Silver Condor	You're the One	Nominated

=== European Film Awards ===
Year	Category	Film	Result
2001	European Director	You're the One	Nominated

=== New York Latin ACE Awards ===
Year	Award	Film	Result
1982	Cinema - Best Director	Volver a empezar	Won

=== Círculo de Escritores Cinematográficos ===
Year	Award	Film	Result
1976	Best Short Film	Mi Marilyn	Won
1982	Best Screenplay	El Crack	Won
1995	Best Director	Canción de cuna	Won
1999	Best Adapted Screenplay	El abuelo	Won
2001	Best Original Screenplay	You're the One	Nominated
2001	Best Director	You're the One	Won
2003	Best Original Screenplay	Historia de un beso	Nominated
2003	Best Director	Historia de un beso	Nominated
2005	Best Original Screenplay	Tiovivo c. 1950	Nominated
2005	Best Director	Tiovivo c. 1950	Nominated
2005	Best Editing	Tiovivo c. 1950	Nominated
2006	Best Adapted Screenplay	Ninette	Nominated
2008	Best Adapted Screenplay	Luz de Domingo	Won
2009	Best Adapted Screenplay	Sangre de mayo	Nominated
2009	Best Director	Sangre de mayo	Nominated
2020	Best Film	El crack cero	Nominated
2020	Best Director	El crack cero	Nominated

=== Sant Jordi Awards ===
Year	Award	Film	Result
1982	Best Short Film	Alfonso Sánchez	Won
1995	Best Spanish Film	Canción de cuna	Won
2023	Career Award	—N/a	Won

=== Iris Awards ===
Year	Award	Film	Result
2001	Best Screenplay	EL abuelo	Won
2001	Best Direction	El abuelo	Nominated

=== Antena de Oro ===
Year	Award	Film	Result
2004	Cinema	—N/a	Won

== Honours ==
Garci was honoured with the National Cinematography Award in 1992, the Gold Medal of Merit in the Fine Arts in 1996 and the Ciudad de Alcalá Award for Arts and Letters in 2013, among many others. He is a member of the Hollywood Academy of Motion Picture Arts and Sciences.

In 2024 he received the EGEDA Gold Medal at the 30th edition of the Forqué Awards, recognizing his career as a director, producer and screenwriter in Spanish cinema and his role as a disseminator.

== Sources ==
- Moret, Andrés, Una vida de repuesto. El cine de José Luis Garci, Hatari Books, Sociedad Limitada, 2022; ISBN 978-84-94788-55-0
- Emotion pictures. El cine de José Luis Garci, foreword by José Luis Garci, Notorious Ediciones, Madrid, 2018; ISBN 978-84-15606-62-8
- Benavent, Francisco María, Cine Español de los Noventa, ediciones Mensajero, 2000; ISBN 84-271-2326-4
- D'Lugo, Marvin: Guide to the Cinema of Spain, Greenwood Press, 1997; ISBN 0-313-29474-7
- Stone, Rob, Spanish Cinema, Pearson Education, 2002; ISBN 0-582-43715-6
- Torres, Augusto, Diccionario del cine Español, Espasa-Calpe, 1994; ISBN 84-239-9203-9
