= José Sacristán =

Spanish actor (born 1937)

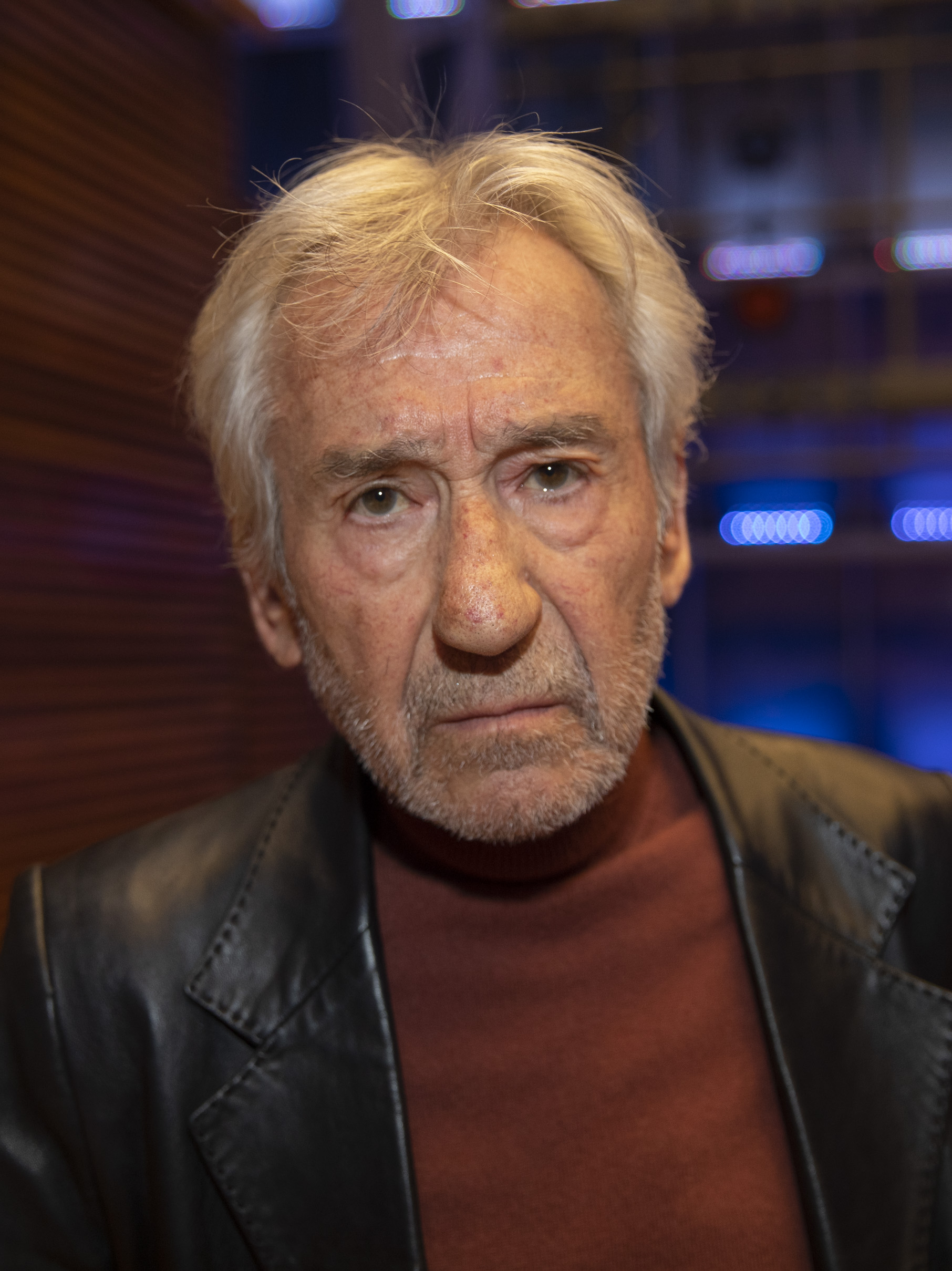
- Sacristán in August 2023
- Born: José María Sacristán Turiégano; 27 September 1937 (age 89); Chinchón, Spain
- Occupation: Actor

José María Sacristán Turiégano (born 27 September 1937), better known as José Sacristán, is a Spanish film, theatre, and television actor.

He made his feature film debut in 1965 in La familia y uno más.

At the Gijón International Film Festival in 2015, he received the Nacho Martinez Award.

At the 60th San Sebastian International Film Festival in 2013 he received the Silver Shell for Best Actor.

== Filmography ==
Year	Title	Role	Notes	Ref.
1965	La familia y uno más	Moisés Balaguer Montero	Feature film debut	
1970	Pierna creciente, falda menguante (Growing Leg, Diminishing Skirt)	Aníbal Trijueque		
1970	La tonta del bote (The Complete Idiot)	Narciso		
1971	Vente a Alemania, Pepe	Angelino		
1971	Españolas en París (Spaniards in Paris)	Plácido		
1975	Lo verde empieza en los Pirineos	Manuel Campillo		
1975	Los nuevos españoles	Pepe		
1976	Las largas vacaciones del 36 (Long Vacations of 36)	Jorge		
1977	Asignatura pendiente	José		
1978	Solos en la madrugada	José Miguel García Carande		
1978	¡Arriba Hazaña!	Nuevo director ('new principal')		
1978	Un hombre llamado Flor de Otoño	Lluís Serracant / Flor de Otoño		
1978	El diputado (Confessions of a Congressman)	Roberto Orbea		
1979	Operación Ogro	Iker		
1982	La colmena (The Beehive)	Martín Marcos		
1982	Estoy en crisis (I'm having a crisis)	Bernabé		
1983	Soldados de plomo	Andrés	Also director and writer	
1984	Epílogo (Epilogue)	Ditirambo		
1984	La noche más hermosa	Federico		
1985	La vaquilla (The Heifer)	Teniente Broseta ('Lieutenant Broseta')		
1986	El viaje a ninguna parte (Voyage to Nowhere)	Carlos Galván		
1987	Cara de acelga (Turnip Top)	Antonio	Also director and writer	
1989	El vuelo de la paloma (The Flight of the Dove)	Pepe		
1992	Un lugar en el mundo (A Place in the World)	Hans		
1992	Yo me bajo en la próxima, ¿y usted?	Pepe	Also director	
1993	El pájaro de la felicidad (The Bird of Happiness)	Eduardo		
1993	Madregilda	Longinos		
1993	Todos a la cárcel (Everyone Off to Jail)	Quintanilla		
1994	Siete mil días juntos	Matías		
2004	Roma	Joaquín Góñez		
2004	Cosas que hacen que la vida valga la pena (Things That Make Living Worthwhile)	Juan		
2011	Madrid, 1987	Miguel		
2012	El muerto y ser feliz (The Dead Man and Being Happy)	Santos		
2014	Magical Girl	Damián		
2015	Perdiendo el norte (Off Course)	Andrés Hernández		
2015	Vulcania	Sr. Valoquia		
2016	Toro	Romano		
2018	Formentera Lady	Samuel		
2020	El inconveniente (One Careful Owner)	Víctor		
2022	13 exorcismos (13 Exorcisms)	Padre Olmedo ('Father Olmedo')		
2024	Escape			

- Fumata blanca (2002)
- La marcha verde (2001)
- Ja me maaten (2000)
- Convivencia (1993)
- A la pálida luz de la luna (1985)
- Navajeros (1980)
- Miedo a salir de noche (1979)
- Mis relaciones con Ana (1979)
- Oro rojo (1978)
- Reina Zanahoria (1977)
- Parranda (1977)
- Hasta que el matrimonio nos separe (1976)
- Ellas los prefieren...locas (1976)
- El secreto inconfesable de un chico bien (1975)
- La mujer es cosa de hombres (1975)
- No quiero perder la honra (1975)
- Mi mujer es muy decente, dentro de lo que cabe (1974)
- Vida conyugal sana (1974)
- Pasqualino Cammarata, Frigate Captain (1974)
- Sex o no sex (1974)
- El abuelo tiene un plan (1973)
- Señora doctor (1973)
- Las estrellas están verdes (1973)
- El padre de la criatura (1972)
- París Bien Vale una Moza (1972)
- Guapo heredero busca esposa (1972)
- Vente a ligar al Oeste (1971)
- No desearás a la mujer del vecino (1971)
- Las ibéricas F.C. (1971)
- The Man Who Wanted to Kill Himself (1970)
- El apartamento de la tentación (1971)
- Cateto a babor (1970)
- Don Erre que Erre (1970)
- Una señora llamada Andrés (1970)
- El ángel (1969)
- Sangre en el ruedo (1969)
- The Troublemaker (1969)
- Soltera y madre en la vida (1969)
- Relaciones casi públicas (1968)
- ¡Cómo está el servicio! (1968)
- Operation Mata Hari (1968)
- Sor Citroën (1967)
- La ciudad no es para mí (1965)

=== Television ===
- Velvet, Antena 3/Netflix, 2014-2016
- Morocco: Love in Times of War, Antena 3, 2017
- Alta mar/High seas, Netflix, 2019-2020

== Accolades ==
Year	Award	Category	Work	Result	Ref.
2013	68th CEC Medals	Best Actor	Madrid, 1987	Nominated	
2013	27th Goya Awards	Best Actor	The Dead Man and Being Happy	Won	
2014	6th Gaudí Awards	Best Actor	The Dead Man and Being Happy	Won	
2015	2nd Feroz Awards	Best Supporting Actor in a Film	Magical Girl	Won	
2015	70th CEC Medals	Best Supporting Actor	Magical Girl	Nominated	
2015	29th Goya Awards	Best Supporting Actor	Magical Girl	Nominated	
2015	24th Actors and Actresses Union Awards	'Toda una vida' Lifetime Achievement Award	—N/a	Won	
2016	25th Actors and Actresses Union Awards	Best Film Actor in a Minor Role	Vulcania	Nominated	
2017	26th Actors and Actresses Union Awards	Best Television Actor in a Leading Role	Velvet	Nominated	
2022	36th Goya Awards	Honorary Goya Award	—N/a	Won	
2025	12th Feroz Awards	Best Supporting Actor in a Film	Escape	Nominated	
