= List of LGBTQ-related films of 1978 =

This is a list of lesbian, gay, bisexual, transgender or queer-related films released in 1978. It contains theatrically released films that deal with important gay, lesbian, bisexual, transgender or queer characters or issues and may have same-sex romance or relationships as a plot device.

== Films ==
Title	Director	Country	Genre	Cast	Notes
A Question of Love	William Blinn	United States	Drama	Gena Rowlands, Jane Alexander, Ned Beatty, Clu Gulager, Bonnie Bedelia	
La Cage aux Folles	Edouard Molinaro	France; Italy	Comedy	Ugo Tognazzi, Michel Serrault, Claire Maurier, Rémi Laurent, Carmen Scarpitta, Benny Luke, Luisa Maneri and Michel Galabru	Co-written by Jean Poiret, based on his play of the same name
California Suite	Herbert Ross	United States	Comedy, romance	Maggie Smith, Alan Alda, Jane Fonda, Michael Caine, Walter Matthau, Elaine May, Herb Edelman, Denise Galik, Richard Pryor, Bill Cosby, Gloria Gifford, Sheila Frazier and Dana Plato	Screenplay by Neil Simon, based on his play of the same name
A Different Story	Paul Aaron	United States	Drama	Meg Foster, Perry King, Valerie Curtin, Peter Donat, Richard Bull, Barbara Collentine, Guerin Barry, Doug Higgins, Lisa James and Burke Byrnes	
El diputado	Eloy de la Iglesia	Spain	Drama	José Sacristán, María Luisa San José, José Luis Alonso, Enrique Vivó, Agustín González, Queta Claver and Ángel Pardo	Aka Confessions of a Congressman
El lugar sin límites	Arturo Ripstein	Mexico	Drama	Roberto Cobo, Lucha Villa, Ana Martín, Gonzalo Vega, Julián Pastor, Carmen Salinas, Fernando Soler, Emma Roldán, Hortensia Santoveña, Blanca Torres, Marta Aura and Tere Olmedo	Aka The Place Without Limits
Un hombre llamado Flor de Otoño	Pedro Olea	Spain	Drama	José Sacristán, Francisco Algora, Carmen Carbonell, Roberto Camardiel, Carlos Piñeiro, José Franco, Antonio Corencia, Antonio Gamero, Félix Dafauce, Carlos Lucena, María Rivas (credited as Maria de las Rivas), María Elena Flores, Mimí Muñoz, Marisa Porcel and Víctor Israel	Aka A Man Called Autumn Flower
In a Year of 13 Moons	Rainer Werner Fassbinder	West Germany	Drama	Volker Spengler, Ingrid Caven, Gottfried John, Elisabeth Trissenaar, Eva Mattes, Günther Kaufmann, Lilo Pempeit (credited as Liselotte Pempeit), Isolde Barth, Karl Scheydt, Walter Bockmayer, Peter Kollek, Bob Dorsay and Gerhard Zwerenz	Lilo Pempeit was director Fassbinder's mother
Jubilee	Derek Jarman	United Kingdom	Drama, music	Jenny Runacre, Nell Campbell, Toyah Willcox, Jordan, Hermine Demoriane, Ian Charleson, Karl Johnson, Linda Spurrier, Jack Birkett, Jayne County, Richard O'Brien, Adam Ant, Helen Wellington-Lloyd, Claire Davenport, Barney James, Lindsay Kemp, Gene October, David Brandon, Siouxsie Sioux and Steven Severin	
Just a Gigolo	David Hemmings	West Germany	Drama	David Bowie, Sydne Rome, Kim Novak, David Hemmings, Maria Schell, Curd Jürgens, Marlene Dietrich, Erika Pluhar, Hilde Weissner, Werner Pochath, Rudolf Schündler and Evelyn Künneke	
Killer Nun	Giulio Berruti	Italy	Drama, horror, mystery	Anita Ekberg, Joe Dallesandro, Alida Valli, Lou Castel, Paola Morra, Massimo Serato, Daniele Dublino, Laura Nucci, Alice Gherardi, Lee De Barriault, Ileana Fraia, Antonietta Patriarca, Sofia Lusy, Nerina Montagnani and Franco Caracciolo	Also known as Suor Omicidi, or Deadly Habits
Let Me Die a Woman	Doris Wishman	United States	Documentary		
Midnight Express	Alan Parker	United States; United Kingdom	Drama	Brad Davis, Irene Miracle, Bo Hopkins, Paolo Bonacelli, Paul L. Smith, Randy Quaid, Norbert Weisser, John Hurt, Kevork Malikyan, Yashaw Adem, Mike Kellin, Franco Diogene, Michael Ensign, Gigi Ballista, Peter Jeffrey and Michael Yannatos	Based on the autobiographical book of the same name by Billy Hayes and William Hoffer
Nighthawks	Ron Peck	United Kingdom	Drama	Ken Robertson, Tony Westrope, Rachel Nicholas James, Maureen Dolan, Stuart Turton (credited as Stuart Craig Turton), Clive Peters, Robert Merrick, Frank Dilbert, Peter Radmall and Ernest Brightmore	
Nos Embalos de Ipanema	Antônio Calmon	Brazil	Drama, Comedy	André de Biase, Angelina Muniz, Zaira Zambelli, Paulo Villaça, Roberto Bonfim, Selma Egrei, Gracinda Freire, Yara Amaral, Suzy Arruda, Jacqueline Laurence, Mauro Mendonça, Stepan Nercessian and Flávio São Thiago (credited as Flavio Sao Thiago)	
Ocaña, retrat intermitent	Ventura Pons	Spain	Documentary		About the Spanish painter José Pérez Ocaña
El sacerdote	Eloy de la Iglesia	Spain	Drama	Simón Andreu, Emilio Gutiérrez Caba, Esperanza Roy, José Franco, Ramón Reparaz, José Vivó, África Pratt and Queta Claver	aka The Priest
The Users	Joseph Hardy	United States	Drama	Jaclyn Smith, Tony Curtis, Red Buttons	
Women in Cellblock 9	Jesús Franco (as Jess Franco)	Switzerland	Action, horror	Karine Gambier	
You Are Not Alone	Ernst Johansen, Lasse Nielsen	Denmark	Romantic, drama	Anders Agensø, Peter Bjerg, Ove Sprogøe, Elin Reimer, Jan Jørgensen, Jørn Faurschou, Merete Axelberg, John Hahn-Petersen, Hugo Herrestrup, Beatrice Palner, Aske Jacoby and Ole Meyer	aka Du er ikke alene
