= José Manuel Cervino =

Spanish actor

José Manuel
- Born: José Manuel Cervino Almeida; 29 October 1940 (age 85); Arona, Tenerife, Canarias, Spain
- Occupation: Actor
- Spouse: Maite Blasco (1977–present)
- Awards: Goya Award for Best Supporting Actor, for Las 13 rosas (2007)

José Manuel Cervino (born 29 October 1940) is a Spanish film and television actor. He won the Goya Award for Best Supporting Actor in 2007 and was nominated for the Goya Award for Best Actor in 1987.

== Life and career ==
José Manuel Cervino Almeida was born in Arona, on the island of Tenerife (Canary Islands), in 1940.

Despite his left-wing political beliefs and reputation for kindness, he often played right-wing villains for director Eloy de la Iglesia. He generally worked in films that explored themes of marginalization, juvenile delinquency, and drug abuse. He won the Goya Award for Best Supporting Actor for his role in 13 Roses.

He appeared in the 2008 television series Men Hunters, which garnered good critical reviews, prompting Antena 3 to keep it on the air despite low viewership until the end of its first and only season. In 2009 he was a member of the jury at the 12th Malaga Film Festival.

In 2013 he appeared in the daily television series Gran Reserva: El Origen, which explored the background of series Gran Reserva, focusing on the lives of two winery families (Cortázar and Reverte) in the 1960s.

== Filmography ==
=== Feature films ===
Year	Film	Director
2017	Oro	Agustín Díaz Yanes
2016	La chispa de la vida	Álex de la Iglesia
2010	Balada triste de trompeta	Álex de la Iglesia
2009	Dos billetes	Javier Serrano
2007	Las 13 rosas	Emilio Martínez Lázaro
2007	El prado de las estrellas	Mario Camus
2007	Lola	Miguel Hermoso
2006	La caja	Juan Carlos Falcón
2004	Tánger	Juan Madrid
2004	¡Hay motivo!	Joaquín Oristrell
2003	Los abajo firmantes	Joaquín Oristrell
1996	Más que amor, frenesí	Miguel Bardem; Alfonso Albacete; David Menkes
1995	Hermana, pero ¿qué has hecho?	Pedro Masó
1987	El Lute: camina o revienta	Vicente Aranda
1987	Guarapo	Santiago Ríos; Teodoro Ríos
1986	Adiós pequeña	Imanol Uribe
1986	La monja alférez	Javier Aguirre Fernández
1983	El pico	Eloy de la Iglesia
1983	El crack II	José Luis Garci
1983	Círculo de pasiones	Claude d'Anna
1982	Colegas	Eloy de la Iglesia
1981	La mujer del ministro	Eloy de la Iglesia
1981	Maravillas	Manuel Gutiérrez Aragón
1980	Gary Cooper, que estás en los cielos	Pilar Miró
1980	Navajeros	Eloy de la Iglesia
1980	El crimen de Cuenca	Pilar Miró
1979	Operación Ogro	Gillo Pontecorvo
1979	Siete días de enero	Juan Antonio Bardem
1978	El diputado	Eloy de la Iglesia
1978	El sacerdote	Eloy de la Iglesia
1977	Camada negra	Manuel Gutiérrez Aragón
1976	Colorín, colorado	José Luis García Sánchez
1976	Emilia... parada y fonda	Angelino Fons
1970	Pierna creciente, falda menguante	Javier Aguirre
1963	Eva 63	Pedro Lazaga

=== Short films ===
Año	Cortometrajes	Director
1994	Party line	José Luis Cubillo
1970	El corazón de un bandido (voz)	Chumy Chúmez

=== Television ===
Year	Series/Miniseries	Director
2020	Vamos Juan	Borja Cobeaga; Víctor García León
2013	Gran Reserva. El origen	Miguel Conde; Rubén Torrejón; Iñaki Mercero; Antonio Hernández; David Ulloa
2008	Cuéntame cómo pasó	Azucena Rodríguez
2004	Aquí no hay quien viva	Laura Caballero
1998	Entre naranjos	Josefina Molina
1994	Compuesta y sin novio	Pedro Masó
1989–1992	Brigada Central	Pedro Masó
1991	Historias del otro lado	José Luis Garci
1991	La huella del crimen: El crimen del expreso de Andalucía	Imanol Uribe
1990	La mujer y el pelele	Mario Camus
1987	Lorca, muerte de un poeta	Juan Antonio Bardem
1985	La huella del crimen: Jarabo	Juan Antonio Bardem
1984	Goya	José Ramón Larraz
1981	Cervantes	Alfonso Ungría
1980	Les chevaux du soleil	François Villiers
1979	Estudio 1: La fierecilla domada	Francisco Abad/Alfredo Castellón
1976–1977	Curro Jiménez	Joaquín Luis Romero Marchent
