= List of Spanish films of 1969 =

A list of films produced in Spain in 1969.

== 1969 ==
Title	Director	Cast	Genre	Notes
1969
Algo amargo en la boca	Eloy de la Iglesia	Juan Diego, Maruchi Fresno, Irene Daina, Javier de Campos, Verónica Luján	Melodrama	
La madriguera	Carlos Saura	Geraldine Chaplin, Per Oscarsson	Drama	Entered into the 19th Berlin International Film Festival
Las Crueles	Vicente Aranda	Capucine, Carlos Estrada, Judy Matheson	Horror	
Cry Chicago	Javier Setó	Jeffrey Hunter, Eduardo Fajardo	Crime	
The Castle of Fu Manchu	Jess Franco	Christopher Lee, Richard Greene	Crime	
Ditirambo	Gonzalo Suárez		Comedy, Drama	
El extraño caso del doctor Fausto	Gonzalo Suárez			Entered into the 20th Berlin International Film Festival
Esa mujer	Mario Camus	Sara Montiel and Ivan Rassimov	Musical legal drama	
España otra vez	Jaime Camino			Entered into the 1969 Cannes Film Festival
La residencia	Narciso Ibáñez Serrador	Lilli Palmer, Cristina Galbó, John Moulder-Brown	Horror	
Los Monstruos del Terror	Hugo Fregonese	Paul Naschy, Michael Rennie	Horror	
Simón Bolívar	Alessandro Blasetti			Entered into the 6th Moscow International Film Festival
Tepepa	Giulio Petroni	Tomas Milian, Orson Welles, John Steiner	Western	Spanish-Italian co-production
Two Undercover Angels	Jesús Franco	Janine Reynaud, Rosanna Yanni, Adrian Hoven		Spanish-West German co-production
The Wanton of Spain	César Fernández Ardavín			Entered into the 6th Moscow International Film Festival
