= List of Spanish films of the 1970s =

Films produced in Spain in the 1970s ordered by year of release on separate pages:

== List of films by year ==
- Spanish films of 1970
- Spanish films of 1971
- Spanish films of 1972
- Spanish films of 1973
- Spanish films of 1974
- Spanish films of 1975
- Spanish films of 1976
- Spanish films of 1977
- Spanish films of 1978
- Spanish films of 1979
