= El buscón (film) =

- Theatrical release poster
- Directed by: Luciano Berriatúa
- Screenplay by: Luciano Berriatúa
- Based on: Historia de la vida del Buscón llamado don Pablos, ejemplo de vagamundos y espejo de tacaños by Francisco de Quevedo
- Starring: Francisco Algora; Ana Belén; Juan Diego; Antonio Iranzo; Francisco Rabal; Josele Román; Laly Soldevila; José Vivó
- Cinematography: Roberto Gómez
- Edited by: Roberto Fandiño
- Music by: July Murillo
- Production company: NG Films
- Release dates: 5 November 1976 (Benalmádena); 27 November 1979 (Spain)
- Country: Spain
- Language: Spanish

El buscón is a 1976 Spanish period film directed by Luciano Berriatúa based on the picaresque novel by Francisco de Quevedo. It stars Francisco Algora in the titular role.

== Plot ==
Set in 17th-century Spain, the plot follows the attempts of swindler Pablos to upgrade his social class.

== Cast ==
- Francisco Algora as Pablos
- Juan Diego as Diego Coronel
- Francisco Rabal as Mata
- Ana Belén as la bailarina ('the dancer')
- Antonio Iranzo as el padre ('the father')
- Laly Soldevila
- Félix Rotaeta
- Josele Román
- Kiti Manver

== Production ==
Quevedo's poem Poderoso caballero prominently features as a song in the film, performed by Ana Belén and arranged by July Murillo. Shooting locations included Pedraza. The film reflects on the original text's scathing view on the society of its time, although it shuns its antisemitism.

== Release ==
The film opened the 8th Benalmádena Auteur Film Festival in November 1976. It was released theatrically in Spain on 27 November 1979.

== See also ==
- List of Spanish films of 1979
