= Enrique San Francisco =

Spanish actor (1955–2021)

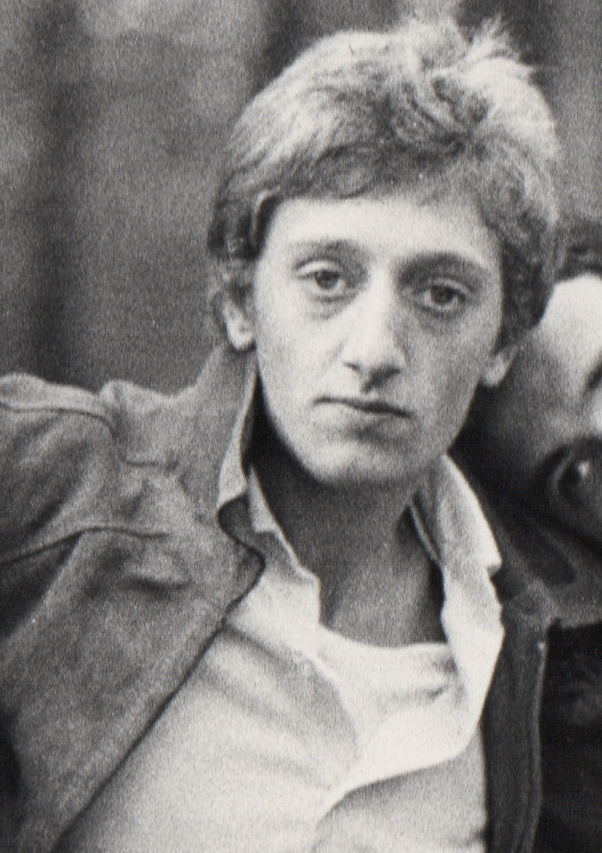
- San Francisco in 1978
- Born: Rogelio Enrique San Francisco Cobo; 10 March 1955; Madrid, Spain
- Died: 1 March 2021 (aged 65); Madrid, Spain
- Other names: Quique San Francisco
- Occupation: Actor

Rogelio Enrique San Francisco Cobo (10 March 1955 – 1 March 2021), better known as Quique San Francisco, was a Spanish actor and comedian. He was a noted figure in the so-called cine quinqui scene.

== Biography ==
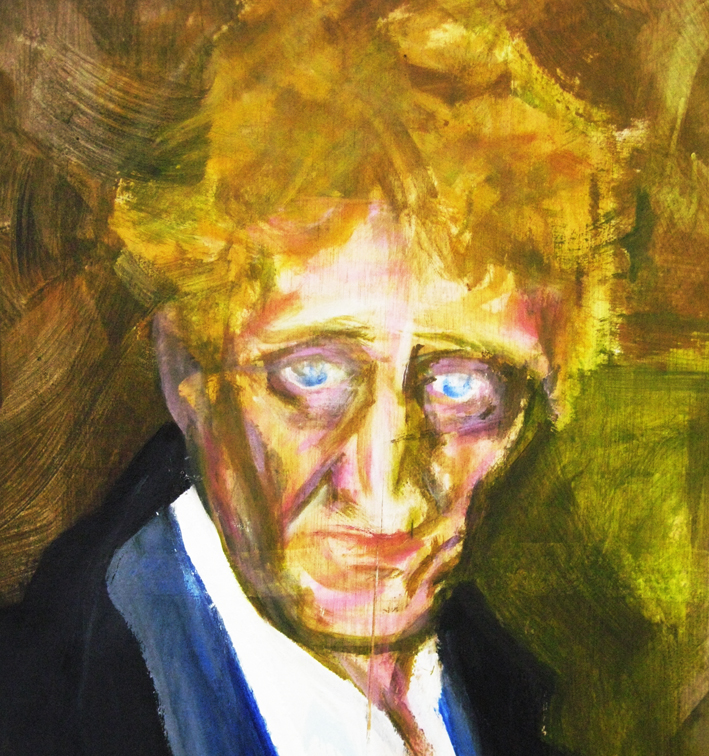
Quick portrait of Enrique San Francisco.

Enrique marked his theatre debut with El sueño de una noche de verano. In 1965, he started his Television career with Televisión Española's show Santi, botones de hotel at the age of 10. and Diario Vasco on 13 March 1965.

In 1975, he joined Madrid Actors' Studio.

In 1975, he starred in the TV series El pícaro, directed by Fernando Fernán Gómez. He appeared in acclaimed films directed by Eloy de la Iglesia such as Colegas (1982), Navajeros (1980) o El pico (1983) in the 1980s.

On 24 October 2002, Enrique suffered a severe accident which led to his prolonged illness. He later appeared in TVE series Cuéntame cómo pasó (2001–2008).

His theatre plays include Frankie y la boda (1965), Los ochenta son nuestros (1988), La noche del sábado (1991), Decíamos ayer (1997), Entre fuerte y flojo (2004), Hijos de mamá (2005), Misterioso asesinato en Manhattan (2007), El enfermo imaginario (2009), Arte (2010), ¡Se quieren! (2011), remake of 2002 drama Amparo Larrañaga and Orquesta Club Virginia (2012), adaptation of 1992 theatre film of the same title.

As a radio host, he worked in shows like No somos nadie in M80 Radio. He also lent his voice to Loquillo y Trogloditas (El Mánager) with Rosario Flores (Gypsy Funky Love Me Do) and with La Fuga (Humo y cristales), among other artists.

San Francisco died in Madrid on March 1, 2021, aged 65, from a pneumonia, after being hospitalized at hospital Clínico San Carlos.

== Filmography ==
- Hombres y mujeres de blanco (1962), by Enrique Carreras.
- Diferente (1962), by Luis María Delgado.
- El aprendiz de clown (1967), by Manuel Esteba Gallego.
- La banda del Pecas (1968), by Jesús Pascual Aguilar.
- Le Paria (1969), by Claude Carliez avec Jean Marais.
- Un invierno en Mallorca (1969), by Jaime Camino.
- Estoy hecho un chaval (1975), by Pedro Lazaga.
- La larga noche de los bastones blancos (1977), by Javier Elorrieta.
- Arriba Hazaña (1978), by José María Gutiérrez.
- Sentados al borde de la mañana, con los pies colgando (1978), by Antonio José Betancor.
- Navajeros (1980), by Eloy de la Iglesia.
- Maravillas (1981), by Manuel Gutiérrez Aragón.
- La mujer del ministro (1981), by Eloy de la Iglesia.
- Colegas (1982), by Eloy de la Iglesia.
- Estoy en crisis (1982), by Fernando Colomo.
- El pico (1983), by Eloy de la Iglesia.
- Amanece, que no es poco (1988), by José Luis Cuerda.
- La huella del crimen: El crimen del expreso de Andalucía (TV) (1991), by Imanol Uribe.
- Orquesta Club Virginia (1992), by Manuel Iborra.
- Acción mutante (1993), by Álex de la Iglesia.
- La mujer de tu vida: La mujer gafe (TV) (1994), by Imanol Uribe.
- La mujer de tu vida: La mujer vacía (TV) (1994), by Manuel Iborra.
- Tirano Banderas (1995), by José Luis García Sánchez.
- Así en el cielo como en la tierra (1995), by José Luis Cuerda.
- La ley de la frontera (1995), by Adolfo Aristarain.
- Belmonte (1995), by Juan Sebastián Bollaín.
- Hotel y domicilio (1995), by Ernesto Del Río.
- La leyenda de Balthasar el castrado (1996), by Juan Miñón.
- Pepe Guindo (1999), by Manuel Iborra.
- París-Tombuctú (1999), by Luis García Berlanga.
- Más pena que gloria (2000), by Víctor García León.
- El chocolate del loro (2001), by Ernesto Martín Ataz.
- Sinfín (2005), by Manuel Sanabria and Carlos Villaverde.
- Hot Milk (2005), by Ricardo Bofill Maggiora.
- La dama boba (2005), by Manuel Iborra.
- Animal Crisis (2008), by Pedro Rivero.
- Save the Zombies (2013), by Federico López.
- Sin rodeos (2018), diredcted by Santiago Segura.
- 4 latas (2019), directed by Gerardo Olivares.

== Television ==
Series and fictions

- Estudio 1 (1971–80) in TVE.
- Los libros (1974–77) in TVE.
- Cuentos y leyendas (1978) in TVE.
- Los pintores del Prado (1974) in TVE.
- El pícaro (1975) in TVE.
- Curro Jiménez (1976) in TVE.
- Proceso a Mariana Pineda (1984) in TVE.
- Miguel Servet, la sangre y la ceniza (1989) in TVE.
- La mujer de tu vida (1990–94) in TVE.
- Compuesta y sin novio (1994) in Antena 3.
- Colegio Mayor (1994) in Telemadrid.
- Los ladrones van a la oficina (1993–95) in Antena 3.
- Ni contigo ni sin ti (1998) in Televisa.
- Condenadas a entenderse (1998) in TVE.
- Ellas son así (1999) in Telecinco.
- Un paso adelante (2005) in Antena 3.
- Cuéntame cómo pasó (2001–08) in TVE.
- Aída (2005) in Telecinco.
- Águila Roja (2015) in TVE.
- Gym Tony (2016) in Cuatro.
- Follow San Francisco (2019) in Flooxer.

Programs

- La bola de cristal (1987–88) in TVE.
- La noche con Fuentes y cía (2001–04) in Telecinco.
- Un, dos, tres... a leer esta vez (2004) in TVE.
- El club de la comedia (2000, 2001, 2002, 2003, 2004, 2011 and 2012) in Canal+ 1, Antena 3 and La Sexta
- El hormiguero (2007–19) (Guest) in Cuatro (2007–11) and Antena 3 (2011–19)
- Mi casa es la tuya (2018) in Telecinco

== Awards and nominations ==
Goya Awards

Year	Category	Film	Result
1989	Goya Award for Best Supporting Actor	El baile del pato	Nominated
1992	Goya Award for Best Supporting Actor	Orquesta Club Virginia	Nominated

Actors' Union Awards

Year	Category	Film	Result
1992	Second Best Actor	Orquesta Club Virginia	Nominated

Other Awards

- Gijón International Film Festival Best Actor Award for El aprendiz de clown (1968)
- Culture Ministry's Best Actor Award – 1979
