= Hans Burmann =

Spanish cinematographer (born 1937)

- Born: Hans Burmann Sánchez; 9 August 1937 (age 89); Bad Honnef, Germany
- Occupation: Cinematographer
- Years active: 1953–2012
- Father: Sigfrido Burmann
- Relatives: Wolfgang Burmann (brother)

Hans Burmann Sánchez (born 9 August 1937) is a German-born Spanish cinematographer. His career in the Spanish film industry began in the early 1950s and progressed from camera assistant and camera operator to director of photography. He photographed films by directors including Mario Camus, Pilar Miró, José Luis Cuerda, Luis García Berlanga, Imanol Uribe, Tomás Gutiérrez Alea and Alejandro Amenábar. Among his best-known credits are La colmena (1982), The Holy Innocents (1984), Thesis (1996), Open Your Eyes (1997) and The Blind Sunflowers (2008).

Burmann received five nominations for the Goya Award for Best Cinematography, for Werther (1986), La rusa (1987), The Dumbfounded King (1991), The Sow (1992) and The Blind Sunflowers (2008).

== Early life and career ==
Burmann was born in Bad Honnef, Germany, to the German-born set designer Sigfrido Burmann and a Spanish mother. His family settled in Madrid, where he grew up in the Ciudad Lineal district near the CEA film studios. His younger brother, Wolfgang Burmann, became a film and theatre art director.

Burmann entered the industry at the age of 15, when his father found him work as a trainee in the camera department of Condenados (1953). He subsequently worked as a camera assistant on Pedro Lazaga's Cuerda de presos (1956). During the 1960s he worked as a camera operator, before becoming a director of photography on feature films in 1970. One of his first credits in that capacity was Ramón Fernández's comedy Thou Shalt Not Covet Thy Fifth Floor Neighbour, a major commercial success in Spain.

In the 1970s, Burmann combined popular feature films with television work. His credits included the series Los camioneros (1973–1974) and Curro Jiménez (1977–1978), as well as Miró's La petición (1976) and Camus's Los días del pasado (1978). He also photographed Miró's The Cuenca Crime (1980). The film's release was delayed for nearly two years after it was seized by the Spanish military authorities, which also initiated proceedings against Miró.

Burmann developed a particularly sustained collaboration with Mario Camus. Their work together included Los pájaros de Baden-Baden (1975), Los días del pasado, La colmena, The Holy Innocents, La vieja música (1985), La rusa and The Field of Stars (2007). Following Camus's death in 2021, Burmann participated in the Spanish Film Academy's tribute to the director.

During the 1990s Burmann worked on Spanish productions and international co-productions, including Miguel Littín's Sandino (1991), Uribe's The Dumbfounded King, Cuerda's The Sow, Gutiérrez Alea and Juan Carlos Tabío's Guantanamera (1995), and Amenábar's first two feature films, Thesis and Open Your Eyes. Burmann recalled that Amenábar initially feared that the much more experienced Hans and Wolfgang Burmann would disregard the young director's decisions, but that the brothers quickly recognised his command of filmmaking. A production study of Thesis includes separate accounts by Burmann and other department heads about their work on the film.

His later work included several Spanish–Latin American productions, among them Tabío's Waiting List (2000), Diego Arsuaga's The Last Train (2002), Sergio Cabrera's The Art of Losing (2004) and Tabío's Horn of Plenty (2008). He also continued his collaboration with Cuerda on The Education of Fairies (2006), The Blind Sunflowers and All Is Silence (2012), his last feature-film credit as director of photography.

== Approach to cinematography ==
Burmann has described the director and the story as the determining elements of a film's visual design. In discussing his working methods, he recalled experimenting with reflected light and with deliberate variations in film exposure and processing to reduce colour saturation and create a greyer image. For period films, he sought to base the lighting on sources plausible within the setting, such as oil lamps and candles. This approach informed the muted interiors and use of shadow in The Blind Sunflowers, which is set in post-Civil War Spain.

In 2017, Burmann appeared with fellow cinematographers José Luis Alcaine and Álex Catalán in a Televisión Española programme devoted to cinematography in Spanish film. He later took part in a 2021 Spanish Film Academy discussion on the craft, where he characterised Berlanga's camera movements as being at the service of the story rather than displays of technique.

== Selected filmography ==
| Year | Title | Director(s) |
|---|---|---|
| 1970 | Thou Shalt Not Covet Thy Fifth Floor Neighbour | Ramón Fernández |
| 1975 | Los pájaros de Baden-Baden | Mario Camus |
| 1976 | La petición | Pilar Miró |
| 1978 | Los días del pasado | Mario Camus |
| 1980 | The Cuenca Crime | Pilar Miró |
| 1980 | Nightmare City | Umberto Lenzi |
| 1982 | La colmena | Mario Camus |
| 1983 | El pico | Eloy de la Iglesia |
| 1984 | The Holy Innocents | Mario Camus |
| 1986 | Werther | Pilar Miró |
| 1987 | La rusa | Mario Camus |
| 1991 | Sandino | Miguel Littín |
| 1991 | The Dumbfounded King | Imanol Uribe |
| 1992 | The Sow | José Luis Cuerda |
| 1995 | Guantanamera | Tomás Gutiérrez Alea and Juan Carlos Tabío |
| 1996 | Thesis | Alejandro Amenábar |
| 1997 | Open Your Eyes | Alejandro Amenábar |
| 1999 | Paris-Timbuktu | Luis García Berlanga |
| 2000 | Waiting List | Juan Carlos Tabío |
| 2002 | The Last Train | Diego Arsuaga |
| 2004 | The Art of Losing | Sergio Cabrera |
| 2006 | The Education of Fairies | José Luis Cuerda |
| 2007 | The Field of Stars | Mario Camus |
| 2008 | The Blind Sunflowers | José Luis Cuerda |
| 2008 | Horn of Plenty | Juan Carlos Tabío |
| 2012 | All Is Silence | José Luis Cuerda |

== Awards and nominations ==
| Year | Award | Category | Work | Result |
|---|---|---|---|---|
| 1987 | Goya Awards | Best Cinematography | Werther | Nominated |
| 1988 | Goya Awards | Best Cinematography | La rusa | Nominated |
| 1992 | Goya Awards | Best Cinematography | The Dumbfounded King | Nominated |
| 1993 | Goya Awards | Best Cinematography | The Sow | Nominated |
| 2009 | Goya Awards | Best Cinematography | The Blind Sunflowers | Nominated |
