= Hidden Pleasures =

Los Placeres ocultos
- Theatrical release poster
- Directed by: Eloy de la Iglesia
- Written by: Eloy de la Iglesia; Rafael Sánchez Campoy; Gonzalo Goicoechea
- Produced by: Alborada P.C.
- Starring: Simón Andreu; Charo López; Tony Fuentes
- Cinematography: Carlos Suárez
- Edited by: José Luis Matesanz
- Music by: Carmelo A. Bernaola
- Distributed by: FILM BANDERA S.A.
- Release date: 14 April 1977
- Running time: 95 mins.
- Country: Spain
- Language: Spanish

Hidden Pleasures (Spanish: Los placeres ocultos) is a 1977 drama film, directed by Eloy de la Iglesia. The script was written by de la Iglesia, Rafael Sánchez Campoy and Gonzalo Goicoechea with the working title La acera de enfrente (literally: The other side of the street, which was used as a pejorative expression for "homosexual"), considered too daring for its time, the title was changed upon release. The film stars Simón Andreu, Charo López and Tony Fuentes.

The plot follows a middle-aged, closeted homosexual banker from a wealthy family, who falls in love with a much younger heterosexual man. Los placeres ocultos is notable for being the first extended representation of gay men in Spanish cinema.

== Plot ==
Eduardo, a well off bank manager in his forties, is a sophisticated closeted homosexual. He keeps his sexual life a secret, but he uses his social and economic position to win over young men.

In one of his regular cruising sessions in the University area, Eduardo meets Miguel, an attractive young man from a humble background and falls in love with him. Then Eduardo starts his usual plan to approach men. Through Nes, a gay man who lives in Miguel's neighborhood, Eduardo finds out Miguel's address and offers him a job in the company run by his friend Raul. Raul and Eduardo had a relationship in the past and Raul is still secretly in love with Eduardo. With the excuse of helping him typing a book, Eduardo takes Miguel to his apartment every afternoon. To gain his friendship, Eduardo buys him a motorcycle. However, Miguel is heterosexual. He has a steady girlfriend, Carmen. Miguel is also entangled in a sexual affair with Rosa, an older married neighbor who he visits with excuse of helping her with plumbing problems in her house. When Eduardo tells his fellings to his new friend, Miguel rejects him.

Eduardo returns to his solitary life looking for fleeting pleasures with young men in cruising spots: cinemas, parks and public toilets. He rejects the offer of his friend Raul to be involved in the emerging gay movement. Then, Eduardo's elderly mother becomes terminally ill and in her deathbed, she confesses that she had known he was gay since he was a teenager. She urges him not to be alone.

In one of his adventures cruising in the park, Eduardo meets Nes again. Nes and members of his gang go to Eduardo's apartment to rob him and beat him. When Miguel finds out what had happened, he worries about Eduardo and beats Nes in revenge. As a result, Eduardo and Miguel resume their friendship. This time, they accept each other and Eduardo respects that Miguel is straight. Miguel introduces his girlfriend Carmen to Eduardo and the trio establish a close relationship. For Eduardo, the company of the young couple fills the void of a family life and eases his loneliness.

The close friendship between Eduardo and the couple formed by Miguel and Carmen is abruptly truncated by Rosa's reappearance. Rosa, angry because she was jilted by Miguel, maliciously begin to spread rumors that Miguel is gay. She talks to Carmen's father and, as a consequence, he forbids his daughter to see Miguel again. Miguel becomes very upset with the loss of his girlfriend, blaming his closeness to Eduardo for it. Hurt and enraged, Miguel goes to the bank where Eduardo works and makes a terrible scene, shouting, insulting, and revealing Eduardo's homosexuality to all.

In the last scene Eduardo is alone in his apartment and hears the rings of the doorbell. He looks through the peephole and his face lights up with joy. When the door is ajar the film ends without seeing the visitor.

== Cast ==
- Simón Andreu as Eduardo
- Tony Fuentes as Miguel
- Charo López as Rosa, Miguel's lover
- Beatriz Rossat as Carmen, Miguel's girlfriend
- Antonio Corencia as Raúl, Eduardo's friend
- Germán Cobos as Ignacio, Eduardo's brother
- Ana Farra as Eduardo's mother
- Ángel Pardo as Nes
- Queta Claver as Miguel's mother
- Antonio Iranzo as Carmen's father
- Antonio Gamero as voyeur in park
- Josele Román as Pili, a prostitute
- Carmen Platero as Olga, a prostitute

== Reception ==
With its thematic centered on homosexuality, Los placeres ocultos was highly controversial. Initially banned by the Spanish censors, critics gave the film relatively kind reviews because they opposed the continuing of censorship one year after the death of Francisco Franco. The review in El Pueblo stated that the film treats the "sad problem of homosexuality, but with Little scandal". On opening night in Madrid, the film was met with massive street demonstrations by gay liberationists, with de la Iglesia recalling that, " It was the first time a Spanish gay group came out in public, with its banners and presenting its demands."
