= Navajeros =

1980 film by Eloy de la Iglesia

- Theatrical release poster
- Directed by: Eloy de la Iglesia
- Screenplay by: Eloy de la Iglesia; Gonzalo Goicoechea
- Produced by: Pepón Coromina; Enrique Gómez Vadillo; Isela Vega
- Starring: José Luis Manzano; José Sacristán; María Martín; Enrique San Francisco; Isela Vega; Verónica Castro
- Cinematography: Antonio Cuevas
- Edited by: José Salcedo
- Music by: Burning
- Production companies: Acuarius Films S.A.; Fígaro Films; Producciones Fenix
- Distributed by: Cinéma International Corporation
- Release date: 6 October 1980 (Spain)
- Running time: 95 minutes
- Countries: Spain; Mexico
- Language: Spanish

Navajeros (transl. 'Knivers') is a 1980 Spanish-Mexican action drama film, written and directed by Eloy de la Iglesia and starring José Luis Manzano, Isela Vega and Jaime Garza. The plot follows the misadventures of El Jaro, a teen delinquent. It is based on the real life of José Joaquín Sánchez Frutos, aka "El Jaro". The film was a co-production between Spain and Mexico where it was released as Dulces navajas. The film was a commercial success in Spain and Mexico. It is considered one of the classics of the quinqui film genre.

== Plot ==
José Manuel Gomez Perales, alias "El Jaro", is a fifteen-year-old with a long criminal record. He occasionally visits his older brother in jail, but spends most of his time with his friends Butano, Johnny and Chus, in and out of detention centers and engaging in all forms of petty theft.

Jaro is in a relationship with Mercedes, a middle-aged Mexican prostitute who provides him with a place to stay, and at one point even saves him from arrest by undercover police officers. Using an illegally acquired sawn-off shotgun, the gang escalates its activities and holds up a gay party in upscale Madrid. Despite their contempt for the law, the youths display a modicum of moral grounding, for instance thwarting assaults by Neo-Nazi thugs or showing obvious signs of remorse after stealing from vulnerable victims. An idealist journalist, who chronicles the dire prospects of youths in slums and the link between poverty and criminality, is intrigued by Jaro's burgenoning folk hero status and obvious charisma.

Jaro is smitten with Chus' sister Toñi, but she is only interested in drugs. Jaro obliges her wishes by meeting El Marqués, a professional drug-dealer, under the pretense of collaboration, and stealing his cannabis stash at knifepoint. Mercedes learns about, and grudgingly accepts, Jaro's love for Toñi and the subsequent love triangle.

The gang, with Toñi's help, ransacks a brothel where Jaro discovers his estranged mother, a prostitute he had not seen since he fled home aged twelve. He immediately calls off the stickup, and the gang barely escapes the police by jumping from the rooftop to a neighboring ballet school. Lara, a stereotypical reactionary detective trailing the youths, subjects Jaro's mother to intense grilling.

El Marqués enacts revenge for the earlier mugging by ambushing Jaro in a pub and having gay bartender Kid Merino rape him. Butano gathers dozens of fellow youth gangs to avenge Jaro. They trash the bar, and Jaro stabs Merino in the anus. The youths are arrested, but they do not fold under Lara's questioning and are sent to a youth detention center. During internment, a psychologist interviews the four friends and finds out about Jaro's zany and naïve fantasies, Butano's outcast status both in his Gypsy family and in mainstream society, Johnny's fish salesman father, and Chus' exclusive interest in drugs. The journalist contacts Mercedes and lobbies the judge, but his first meeting with the youth fails to materialize when Jaro escapes.

During a burglary, Jaro's gang is machine-gunned by patrolling Civil Guards; Chus is killed instantly and Jaro is injured in the groin and wakes up in a hospital, where he learns that he lost one testicle. The surviving gang members are incarcerated in a Zamora prison wing reserved for violent underage criminals. Johnny decides to serve his sentence and work with his father upon release, but Jaro and Butano escape. Jaro reunites with Mercedes, who tells him Toñi is pregnant. Jaro welcomes the news but Toñi, who blames him for her brother's death, wants an abortion. Mercedes, who is genuinely in love with Jaro, intercedes and persuades Toñi not to terminate the pregnancy, promising her to take care of Jaro and the child.

While driving a stolen vehicle, Jaro, Butano and two new gang members stumble into an anti-terrorist police road block. The youths escape unharmed but witness the police and the terrorists killing each other. Jaro visits his mother, but the reunion is cut short by her pimp, who has his face slashed by Jaro in the ensuing knife fight. Jaro flees the scene, devastated to see that his mother only shows concern for her pimp's wellbeing.

Toñi, pregnant against her will, grows increasingly bitter. Chus' death, his own injury (which he perceives as emasculation), his brushes with death, his mother's betrayal, Toñi's nagging and his overall hopeless predicament instill a bold, nihilistic fury in Jaro. He storms out of the apartment and leads his gang in more criminal activity, unaware that Toñi has just broken water and is being rushed to the hospital. The youths mug a man in his car and when the victim's friend accosts them with a shotgun, Jaro deliberately provokes the man into shooting him dead. Simultaneously, his son is born.

== Cast ==
- José Luis Manzano as El Jaro
- Isela Vega as Mercedes
- Jaime Garza as El Butano
- Verónica Castro as Toñi
- José Sacristán as Journalist
- Enrique San Francisco as El Marqués
- María Martín as El Jaro's mother
- José Manuel Cervino as Lara
- Ramón Reparaz as The Commissar
- José Luis Fernández "Pirri" as El Nene
