= Something Bitter in the Mouth =

- Spanish: Algo amargo en la boca
- Directed by: Eloy de la Iglesia
- Starring: Juan Diego; Verónica Luján; Javier de Campos; Maruchi Fresno; Irene Daina
- Release date: 1969
- Country: Spain
- Language: Spanish

Something Bitter in the Mouth (Spanish: Algo amargo en la boca) is a 1969 Spanish film directed by Eloy de la Iglesia. It is a blend of psychological thriller, erotic-intimist melodrama and sociopolitical parable.

== Plot ==
César becomes the object of sexual desire of three women (Clementina, Aurelia and Ana) for different reasons.

== Cast ==
- Juan Diego as César
- Irene Daina as Clementina
- Maruchi Fresno as Aurelia
- Verónica Luján as Ana
- Javier de Campos as Jacobo

== Production ==
The film had issues with Francoist censorship, primarily involving the script rather than the finished cut. They prevented the film from the denouement featured in the original script, with the three women killing César, as the executioner ended up being the mentally-retarded servant Jacobo. The final script was penned by Eloy de la Iglesia with the collaboration of Ana Diosdado (uncredited).

== Release ==
The film was theatrically released in Barcelona in 1969. It opened in the Spanish capital in 1972, after the success of De la Iglesia's The Glass Ceiling.

== Reception ==
Fernando Morales of El País described the film as "a personal and murky melodrama, full of morbidity, which had good manners", yet also "greatly diminished by the [censorship] issues".

== See also ==
- List of Spanish films of 1969
