= Hostages in the Barrio =

- Theatrical release poster
- Spanish: La estanquera de Vallecas
- Directed by: Eloy de la Iglesia
- Screenplay by: Gonzalo Goicoechea; Eloy de la Iglesia; José Luis Alonso de Santos
- Based on: La estanquera de Vallecas by José Luis Alonso de Santos
- Produced by: Ángel Huete
- Starring: Emma Penella; José Luis Gómez; José Luis Manzano; Maribel Verdú
- Cinematography: Manuel Rojas
- Edited by: Julio Peña
- Music by: Patxi Andión
- Production company: Ega Medios Audiovisuales
- Release date: 9 April 1987
- Country: Spain
- Language: Spanish
- Budget: 83 million ₧

Hostages in the Barrio (Spanish: La estanquera de Vallecas) is a 1987 Spanish quinqui film directed by Eloy de la Iglesia, consisting of an adaptation of the stage play La estanquera de Vallecas by José Luis Alonso de Santos. It stars Emma Penella, José Luis Gómez, José Luis Manzano and Maribel Verdú.

== Plot ==
After two criminals attempt to rob a tobacco retailer in Vallecas, they are trapped inside and eventually develop a sort of friendly relationship with their hostages (the clerk and her niece).

== Cast ==
- Emma Penella as Doña Justa
- José Luis Gómez as Leandro
- José Luis Manzano as Tocho
- Maribel Verdú as Ángeles
- Fernando Guillén
- Jesús Puente as the commissar
- Antonio Gamero
- Nieve Parola
- Antonio Iranzo
- Tina Sainz
- Chari Moreno
- José Luis Fernández "Pirri"
- Azucena Hernández
- Simón Andreu
- Tony Valento as chocolatier

== Production ==
An adaptation of the stage play La estanquera de Vallecas by José Luis Alonso de Santos, the screenplay was penned by Gonzalo Goicoechea, Eloy de la Iglesia and Alonso de Santos. An Ega Medios Audiovisuales production, the film was shot in Madrid in 1986. The soundtrack was composed and performed by Patxi Andión. The budget amounted to 83 million ₧.

Maribel Verdú revealed that she suffered physical attacks by José Luis Manzano during filming.

== Release ==
The film premiered on 9 April 1987.

== Accolades ==
Year	Award	Category	Nominee(s)	Result	Ref.
1988	2nd Goya Awards	Best Editing	Julio Peña	Nominated	

== See also ==
- List of Spanish films of 1987
