= Venus (2023 film) =

- Theatrical release poster
- Directed by: Víctor Conde
- Written by: Víctor Conde
- Based on: Venus (play) by Víctor Conde
- Starring: Antonio Hortelano; Ariana Bruguera; Paula Muñoz; Carlos Serrano-Clark; Carlos Gorbe; Juan Diego; Lolita Flores; Elena Furiase; Miquel Fernández; Ana Rujas; Carla Tous
- Cinematography: Pol Turrents
- Edited by: Mar Jorge Sotelo; Bernat Aragonés
- Music by: Alfonso Casado
- Production companies: Antonello Novellino; Kaplan; AMC; Antaviana Films; Paloma Tejero; Raúl Ruano Monge; Claqueta Blanca; Winp Consulting
- Distributed by: Begin Again Films
- Release date: 17 February 2023
- Country: Spain
- Language: Spanish

Venus is a 2023 Spanish independent black-and-white drama film written and directed by Víctor Conde based on the play of the same name, which stars Antonio Hortelano, Ariana Bruguera, Paula Muñoz, Carlos Serrano-Clark and Carlos Gorbe.

== Plot ==
The plot tracks the stories involving 5 characters who meet in a café.

== Cast ==
- Antonio Hortelano as Jorge
- Ariana Bruguera as Alicia
- Paula Muñoz as Paula
- Carlos Serrano-Clark as Mario
- Carlos Gorbe as Miguel
- Juan Diego as padre de Jorge
- Lolita
- Elena Furiase
- Miquel Fernández
- Ana Rujas
- Biel Montoro
- Carla Tous

== Production ==
The film was produced by Antonello Novellino, Kaplan, AMC, Antaviana Films, Paloma Tejero, Raúl Ruano Monge, Claqueta Blanca, and Winp Consulting. Shooting took place in Madrid. Shot in black and white, the film was lensed by Pol Turrents, scored by Alfonso Casado, and edited by Mar Jorge Sotelo and Bernat Aragonés.

== Release ==
Distributed by Begin Again Films, Venus was released theatrically in Spain on 17 February 2023. It was picked up for a streaming release on Filmin on 12 May 2023.

== Reception ==
Beatriz Martínez of El Periódico de Catalunya rated the film 3 out of 5 stars, writing that the film "is tiny, but endearing and you can see the love with which it is made".

Carlos Marañón of Cinemanía summed up the film in his verdict as "echoes of castizo Nouvelle Vague for a crossing of impossible loves".

== See also ==
- List of Spanish films of 2023
