= List of Spanish films of 1977 =

A list of films produced in Spain in 1977 (see 1977 in film).

== 1977 ==
Title	Director	Cast	Genre	Notes	Ref.
1977
That Obscure Object of Desire	Luis Buñuel	Fernando Rey, Ángela Molina, Carole Bouquet	Surreal	2 Academy Award nominee	
A un dios desconocido	Jaime Chávarri	Héctor Alterio	Gay drama	San Sebastian Film Festival Festival winner	
Elisa, vida mía	Carlos Saura	Fernando Rey, Geraldine Chaplin, Ana Torrent	Drama	Best Actor award at the 1977 Cannes Film Festival	
La escopeta nacional	Luis García Berlanga	José Luis López Vázquez, Luis Escobar	Comedy	The first part of the trilogy	
La vieja memoria	Jaime Camino		Documentary	About the Spanish Civil War	
Foul Play	Juan Antonio Bardem			Won the Golden Prize at the 10th Moscow International Film Festival	
Perros callejeros	José Antonio de la Loma				
Mi hija Hildegart	Fernando Fernán Gómez	Amparo Soler Leal			
La criatura	Eloy de la Iglesia				
Cambio de sexo	Vicente Aranda				
Camada negra	Manuel Gutiérrez Aragón				
Asignatura pendiente	José Luis Garci				
Tigres de papel	Fernando Colomo				
