= La mujer del ministro =

- Theatrical release poster
- Directed by: Eloy de la Iglesia
- Screenplay by: Eloy de la Iglesia; Gonzalo Goicoechea; Raúl Alcántara; Ángel Sastre
- Starring: Amparo Muñoz; Simón Andreu; María Martín; Irina Kouberkaya; Julieta Serrano; Manuel Torres; Pedro Armendáriz
- Cinematography: Carlos Suárez
- Edited by: José Salcedo
- Music by: Alfonso Santisteban
- Production companies: Alborada; Plamitex; Cektisur
- Release date: 27 August 1981
- Running time: 101 minutes
- Countries: Spain; México
- Language: Spanish
- Budget: 25,000,000 ₧
- Box office: 477.126 €

La mujer del ministro (The Minister’s Wife) is a 1981 Spanish-Mexican film directed by Eloy de la Iglesia and starring Manuel Torres, Simón Andreu and Amparo Muñoz. The complex plot mixes terrorism, politics, corruption and sex in the convoluted politic environment during the so-called Spanish Transition. The film is notable for its lesbian subplot. It was classified S as pornographic for a nude scene in a sauna.

== Plot ==
Rafael, a young man from the provinces, works as a waiter in a resort and helps himself economically having sex for money with rich older women. During a bomb threat, he is discovered in bed with one of the guest, Leonor Marchioness of Montenegro, and he is fired as a consequence.

The Marchioness of Montenegro is an aging aristocrat, ruined economically, but still with wealthy and influential friends. She helps Rafael finds a new job in Madrid as the gardener in the mansion of Antonio Fernández Herrador, Minister of economy in the new democratic Spanish government. Rafael quickly adapts in his job as a gardener and befriends Chema, the son of Angelina the mansion's housekeeper. Chema explains to Rafael that Martha, the minister's secretary, is the most powerful person in the household. Rafael is brought to the notice of his employers when he suffers a mild injury during a botched attempt to the life of the minister.

Immersed in his political career, the minister neglects his beautiful young wife, Teresa. Their marriage is going through a rough patch. Teresa, sexually frustrated with her husband's impotence, begins to pay attention to the attractive young gardener. Martha, a lesbian who actually lust after Teresa, has sex with Manuel before the young man becomes Teresa's lover under the watchful eyes of both Martha and the Marchioness of Montenegro. The Marchioness, who truly cares about Rafael, wants to take advantage of the situation. She offers her help to the lovers and her house becomes the retreat for Teresa and Rafael's intimate encounters. Soon after, the Marchioness presses the Minister Fernández Herrador to help her obtain a large bank loan necessary to save her from total economic ruin.

The situation become murkier when a leftist terrorist group contact Rafael. They need the gardener's help in order to know the whereabouts of the Minister since they are planning his kidnapping. Rafael does not want to get involve and, afraid, tries to escape to his hometown, but the terrorist threaten him. Desperate, Rafael asks for help to the Marchioness since she still has powerful friends in the security forces loyal to the old regime. However, before she can do something, the terrorist, who have been following Rafael's every move, kill the Marchioness. Her assassination is considered political motivated since she was a well-known activist in right wing causes.

Teresa becomes pregnant by her lover and wants to have the baby. She gives the news to Rafael who tells her about the terrorist and his certainty that they killed the Marchioness. Rafael and Teresa talk about it with Martha, who advises them to confess all to the Minister. The minister is outrage. He would like his wife to have an abortion, but she is determined to have the child. Confronted with his wife threats of divorce, the minister reluctantly accepts the situation since otherwise a scandal would ruin his political ambitions. The minister confines these problems to Lara, a member of the security forces. Lara assigns the investigation of the terrorist kidnapping threats to Romero, a hard-boiled detective linked with the security forces of the government. Romero interrogates Rafael, who identifies the terrorist through photographs. Soon after, the terrorist are killed by secret security agents of the government. Romero tells Rafael that the terrorist were killed in a settling of accounts among themselves. Lara and Romero meet to talk about the investigation, but during a brief absence by Romero, Lara is killed by a gunman.

The plan to kidnap the minister is actually a hoax in which Fernández Herrador has been involved all along with Martha's complicity. The minister has accepted a three thousand million bribery deal from an international corporation interested in building five nuclear plants. Fernández Herrador's idea is to run away with the money to South America under the cover of a new identity. To all, he would have been killed by his kidnappers. Romero discovers the minister's plans and confronts him, but Fernández Herrador persuades Romero to accept money in exchange for his silence. Martha's motivation has been to have Teresa only for herself once the minister has escaped. She wants to kill Rafael, but Chema sees her threatening Rafael at gun point and Romero stops her. Perplexed at her husband's plan, Teresa tells all to Rafael, who has been an unwilling participant in the minister's plan. She encourages her lover to flee. The next day, Rafael hears the news on T.V that the Minister Fernández Herrador has been kidnapped. Rafael wants to buy a ticket to travel outside Madrid, but he is stopped by Romero. Romero says he has a job to offer him.

== Cast ==
- Manuel Torres as Rafael
- Simón Andreu as Antonio, the Minister Fernández Herrador.
- Amparo Muñoz as Teresa
- María Martín as the Marquise of Montenegro
- Irina Kuberskaya as Martha
- Pedro Armendáriz, Jr. as Inspector Romero
- José Manuel Cervino as Lara
- José Luis Fernández Pirri as Chema
- Carlos Kaniowsky as Policeman
- Enrique San Francisco as a terrorist
- Julieta Serrano as Angelina

== Music ==
The original score for the film was written by Alfonso Santisteban. The sound track includes the themes :

- Sarairo sung by Manzanita
- Canon by Johann Sebastian Bach
