= Fantasía... 3 =

Fantasia 3
- Theatrical release poster
- Directed by: Eloy de la Iglesia
- Screenplay by: Eloy de la Iglesia, Fernando Martín Iniesta
- Based on: Stories by L. Frank Baum; Hans Christian Andersen; Brothers Grimm
- Produced by: Manuel Caño
- Starring: Juan Diego; Maribel Martín; Dyanik Zurakowska
- Cinematography: Santiago Crespo
- Edited by: José Luis Matesanz
- Music by: Fernando García Morcillo
- Production companies: Madrid-14; Pan Latina Films
- Release date: 1966
- Running time: 85 minutes
- Country: Spain
- Language: Spanish
- Box office: ESP 6,146,219 (Spain)

Fantasia 3 (English: Fantasy 3) is a 1966 Spanish fantasy film directed by Eloy de la Iglesia. It is based on three fairy tales: Hans Christian Andersen’s "The Little Mermaid"; the 1900 children's novel, The Wonderful Wizard of Oz by L. Frank Baum and "The Devil with the Three Golden Hairs" by the Brothers Grimm. Fantasia 3 was de la iglesia's first feature-length film

== Plot ==
The film is an adaptation of three fairy tales classics of children literature.

"The Maiden of the Sea" tells the story of Coraline, a mermaid who wants to be human after she falls in love with a Sailor Prince. "The 3 hairs of the Devil" tells the story of Tomasin, a young man of humble background, which a seer had a presentiment that he would marry the daughter of the king, who must perform a series of tests to avoid death, and marriage the princess is accepted by the king. "The Wizard of Oz" tells the story of Sylvia, a girl who get lost in the woods with her dog Toto, and along with her friends The Scarecrow, The Tin Man and the Cowardly Lion, have been snatched the brain, heart and courage, respectively. They go the Emerald City to request help from the Wizard of Oz adapting three children’s stories:, The three hairs from the devil and The Wizard of Oz.

== Cast ==
The Maid of the Sea

- Dyanik Zurakowska as Coralina
- Jorge Palacios as the sailor Prince
- Sergio Mendizábal as the King Rey
- Argentina Cases as Princesa Astrid
- Marisol García as Sirena
- Antonio Casas as Neptuno

The three hairs from the devil:

- Juan Diego as Tomasín
- Javier Loyola as the King
- Lola Losada as the Princess
- Cris Huerta as Ottón
- Carmen Luján as the Queen
- Tomás Blanco as the Devil

The Wizard of Oz

- Maribel Martín as Silvia
- Manuel Andrés as Cowardly Lion
- Javier de Campos as The Scarecrow
- Italo Ricardi as The Tin Man
- Antonia Mas as the mother
- Luis Prendes as the Wizard of Oz
