= El pico 2 =

El Pico 2
- Theatrical release poster
- Directed by: Eloy de la Iglesia
- Screenplay by: Fermín Cabal; Gonzalo Goicoechea; Eloy de la Iglesia
- Produced by: José Antonio Pérez Giner
- Starring: José Luis Manzano; Fernando Guillén; Lali Espinet; Jaume Valls
- Cinematography: Javier Aguirresarobe
- Edited by: Julio Peña
- Music by: Joaquín Carmona; Luís Iriondo
- Production company: Ópalo Films
- Distributed by: Ópalo Films
- Release date: 9 November 1984
- Running time: 122 minutes
- Country: Spain
- Language: Spanish
- Box office: 930.349,01 €

El Pico 2 (Overdose) is a 1984 film directed by Eloy de la Iglesia. It stars José Luis Manzano and Fernando Guillén.

The films centers on the relationship between a Civil guard and his heroin addict son who falls in an escalating life of crime. El Pico 2 is a follow-up to El pico which was more successful. Drugs, delinquency, generational problems and the underworld of heroin are the themes of the two films.

== Plot ==
Paco, a young drug addict, recently mourning the death of his best friend from a heroin overdose, is unable to overcome his addiction on his own. Withdrawal is too painful for Paco, who is under the watchful eye of his severe but concerned widower father, Evaristo Torrecuadrada, a civil guard commandant. To find a detox treatment for Paco, father and son move to Madrid. They are welcome in the household of Paco's feisty grandmother who lives with her faithful old maid, Adela. Both women naively believe that Paco ailment is diabetes completely unaware of his drug addiction. While Paco begins a methadone treatment with a Chilean doctor, Miguel Caballero, a journalist, investigates the killing of a drug dealer and his wife. An eye witness testimony points out to Paco and his death friend as the killers. Paco is questioned by the police. He confesses to be implicated in the case and he is sent to jail.

At his arrival in prison, Paco is beaten up and robbed by his cellmates. A fellow inmate, El Pirri befriends Paco and gives him a new pair of shoes to replace the stolen ones. Pirri introduces Paco to El Lehendakari, a Basque gang member influential in prison. Lehendakari takes Paco under his wing and arranges for Paco and Pirri to move to his cell which Lehendakari already shares with his transsexual lover. Soon, however, Paco begins to shoot heroin in jail with Pirri. El Tejas, a member of a rival gang has also taken an interest in Paco, bullying him. Betty, Paco's former girlfriend, comes to visit him. She forgives Paco for abandoning her with the body of his death friend.

Torrecuadrada hires Laureano Alons, a savvy lawyer, to get Paco out of jail. They locate the only witness against Paco, a neighbor of the slayed couple. She claims to have seen Paco leaving the scene of the crime. Laureano pays her a visit intimating, with subtle threats, that she must change her testimony . When the woman returns home, she finds her pet canary death. Afraid, she withdraws her previous testimony implicating Paco. Meanwhile, Lehendakari stabs himself in the abdomen so seriously as to be taken to a hospital from where he plans to escape. Lehakandit's lover fails to follow him using the same ruse and commits suicide while Paco and Pirri were dazed by their heroin consumption. Lehendakari's departure leaves Paco and Pirri without their heroin provision or money. Desperate to get the drugs they crave, Paco visits El Tejas and his gang, but he is robbed and raped by El Tejas and his three friends who swindle Paco out of the little money he had left. When Paco returns without drugs or money and Pirri finds out that Paco has been raped, Pirri confronts El Tejas in a knife fight. Pirri manages to slash Tejas in the face, but they are separated by the guards. At that very moment, Paco is released from jail.

Free again, Paco initially returns to his grandmother's household, but moves shortly after with Betty. They begin to live out of her tricks as a prostitute and Paco's dealing pushing drugs. Their crimes escalate as Lehendakari, who has escaped from the hospital, joins the couple. The two men begin to share Betty's apartment and Betty herself. The three friends, in an escalating life of crime, carry out a number of robberies to earn money in and around Madrid. As the trio attacks an armored van, Lehendakari is injured in one shoulder so they flee to an abandoned house in Bilbao. The journalist locates Paco and passes the information to Torrecuadrada who goes in search of his son in order to arrest him. Torrecuadrada confronts the trio alone while the other civil guards wait outside the house. In the ensuing confrontation Torrecuadrada is killed by Lehendakari who tries to escape through a window. Stunned by the death of his father, Paco kills Lehendakari while the civil guards enter to arrest Paco and Betty.

== Cast ==
- José Luis Manzano as Paco
- Fernando Guillén as Evaristo Torrecuadrada
- Lali Espinet as Betty
- Jaume Valls as El Lehendakari
- Rafaela Aparicio as Paco's grandmother
- José Luís Fernández, El Pirri as El Pirri
- Valentín Paredes as El Tejas
- Gracita Morales as Adela
- Fermín Cabal as Miguel Caballero
- Pedro Nieva Parola as Lieutenant Alcántara
- Agustín González as Laureano Alons
- Paloma Alaez as Esperanza
