= Colegas =

- Theatrical release poster
- Directed by: Eloy de la Iglesia
- Written by: Gonzalo Goicoechea; Eloy de la Iglesia
- Produced by: José Antonio Pérez Giner
- Starring: Antonio Flores; Rosario Flores; José Luis Manzano
- Cinematography: Hans Burmann; Antonio Cuevas
- Music by: Miguel Botafogo; Antonio Flores
- Production company: Opalo Films
- Release date: 25 October 1982
- Running time: 117 minutes
- Country: Spain
- Language: Spanish

Colegas (English: Pals) is a 1982 Spanish quinqui film written and directed by Eloy de la Iglesia. It stars José Luis Manzano, Antonio Flores and Rosario Flores.

Set in the Concepción neighborhood of Madrid, the plot follows the misadventures of two young friends who are forced into street hustling and ever-expanding life of crime when one impregnates the sister of the other and they need to get the money to pay for her to have an abortion. Made with a low budget and no professional actors, Colegas was reviled by critics but it was a commercial success. It is considered one of the classics of the quinqui film genre.

== Plot ==
José is an unemployed eighteen-year-old living with his parents and four siblings in a cramped apartment in the slums of Madrid. Marginalized by poverty and with no prospects of finding a job, José spends his time with his best friend Antonio in a video arcade, smoking pot or in a fruitless search of work. When he is not with his pals (colegas in Spanish) José is with his girlfriend Rosario, who is Antonio's sister. The situation in both families is grim. José has to share a small bedroom with his two hormone crazy younger brothers, while Antonio and Rosario have to deal with their irascible mother, Herminia. Things get more complicated when Rosario finds out she is pregnant. After revealing the news to the worried José, he tells what is going on to Antonio. Angry and disappointed with José for impregnating his sister the two best friends have a fist fight, but quickly regained their composure and reconcile. They are determined to help Rosario who is not sure if she is going to have the baby or not. Rosario makes inquires with some friends finding a nurse who can perform an illegal abortion, but she needs eight thousand pesetas to pay for it.

Unable to find a job, but desperate to raise the money needed as soon as possible Antonio and Jose accept the proposal of another pal, el tatuado, to get the money hustling in a gay bathhouse. At the steaming room el tatuado introduces them to two old gay men who offered them money in exchange for sex. They accept, but at the last minute neither Jose nor Antonio can get to the end and run away. With the hustling failure behind them Antonio and Jose try to rob a store but they are equally inept at it. Deep down, they are too good, naive and inexperience to be career criminals. Pirri, José's middle brother, who is much bolder, introduce them to Rogelio, a local professional crook, who recruits teenagers for his criminal activities.

Rogelio sends Antonio and José to Morocco. Their task is to smuggle drugs hidden in pellets that they place inside their anuses using a lot of cream. The situation is very risky and uncomfortable, but the two pals are successful in their enterprise bringing the drugs into Spain undetected. The money that Rogelio pays them is enough to cover the abortion fee. However, Rogelio, aware of their intention, propose them to convince Rosario to have the baby since he can sell it to a couple abroad who can not conceive. Rogelio wants the deal to remain secret offering a considerable amount of money. He would also pay for the pregnancy and delivery expenses.

Antonio and José discuss the deal with Rosario. Antonio prefers that his sister ends her pregnancy. José would leave it up to Rosario who is hesitant what to do. When the moment comes to have the abortion Rosario just can not do it. The three pals decide to take Rogelio's offer. Shortly after, Rosario has a bitter argument home with her mother, who is completely against her daughter's relationship with José. During the heated confrontation Rosario confesses that she is pregnant with José's baby and decides to run away with him. There is also trouble in José's household. The police arrive to his house. He initially think the police wants to arrest him, but they have come to detain Pirri, who has been involved in drug deals with Rogelio's gang. Rosario's hysterical mother comes with her husband to talk to José's parents and a huge argument ensures between the two families

Antonio informs Rogelio that have been a change of plans. Rosario has changed her mind and has told their parents about her pregnancy. This brings their deal down. Rosario's pregnancy should have remained a secret. An argument begins and Antonio decides to run for his life after punching one of the members of Rogelio's gang. they pursue him through an empty construction site. The guy that Antonio punched shoots at him and kills him.

At Antonio's funeral the two grieving families are reunited. José declines his father offer of help if he marries Rosario. Instead he decides to live with her without marrying and raise their child together without help.

== Cast ==
- José Luis Manzano as José
- Antonio Flores as Antonio
- Rosario Flores as Rosario
- Enrique San Francisco as Rogelio
- José Manuel Cervino as Esteban
- José Luis Fernández Eguía as Pirri
- Antonio B. Pineiro as Tatuado
- Queta Ariel as Herminia
- Francisco Casares as Antonio's father
- Isabel Perales as José's mother
- Ricardo Márquez as Sebas

== Awards ==
- Best film at Festival de Tomar, 1982

== See also ==
- List of Spanish films of 1982
