= Xtreme (2021 film) =

2021 Spanish action film

- Promotional release poster
- Spanish: Xtremo
- Directed by: Daniel Benmayor
- Written by: Teo García; Iván Ledesma; Genaro Rodríguez
- Starring: Teo García; Óscar Casas; Andrea Duro; Óscar Jaenada; Sergio Peris-Mencheta; Alberto Jo Lee
- Cinematography: Daniel Aranyó
- Edited by: Oriol Pérez; Elena Ruiz
- Music by: Lucas Vidal
- Production company: Showrunner Films
- Distributed by: Netflix
- Release date: 4 June 2021
- Running time: 111 minutes
- Country: Spain
- Language: Spanish

Xtreme (Spanish: Xtremo) is a 2021 Spanish revenge thriller and martial arts film directed by Daniel Benmayor, written by Teo García, Iván Ledesma and Genaro Rodríguez and starring Teo García, Óscar Jaenada, Sergio Peris-Mencheta and Óscar Casas.

== Plot ==
Máximo, a loyal member of Lucero's gang loses his son and is left for dead, when Lucero - his blood brother and heir to the criminal empire kills his own father to take over the leadership.

After managing to survive and fuming over the betrayal, Máximo spends next couple of years in hiding, honing his fighting skills, while planning to take down Lucero with the help of Maria, Lucero's foster sister. He also forms a fatherly bond with a boy named Leo whom he begins to train.

Fate calls upon the former fighter as Leo gets involved with Lucero's gang and now it is up to Máximo and Maria to save him, and wreak their long awaited vengeance on Lucero.

== Cast ==
- Teo García as Máximo
- Óscar Jaenada as Lucero
- Sergio Peris-Mencheta as Finito
- Óscar Casas as Leo
- Andrea Duro as María
- Alberto Jo Lee as Chul Moo
- Luis Zahera as Urquiza
- Juan Diego as Ricardo
- Nao Albet
- Isa Montalbán as Daniela
- Cesar Bandera as Romeo
- Jose Álvarez-Boze as Hombre de Jaro
- Iván Valentín as Ruso

== See also ==
- List of Spanish films of 2021
