= El pico =

El Pico
- Theatrical release poster
- Directed by: Eloy de la Iglesia
- Screenplay by: Eloy de la Iglesia; Gonzalo Goicoechea,
- Produced by: José Antonio Pérez Giner
- Starring: José Luis Manzano; Javier García; José Manuel Cervino; Andrea Albani
- Cinematography: Hans Burmann
- Edited by: José Salcedo
- Music by: Luis Iriondo
- Production company: Ópalo Films
- Distributed by: Ópalo Films
- Release date: 16 September 1983 (Spain)
- Running time: 105 minutes
- Country: Spain
- Language: Spanish
- Box office: €1,334,173.87

El Pico (English: Overdose) is a 1983 Spanish film written and directed by Eloy de la Iglesia. It stars José Luis Manzano. The films centers on drug addiction, urban juvenile delinquency, and Basque nationalism in Spain during the 1980s. El Pico was the most successful among the quinqui films.

Set in the Basque country in a cold and dark atmosphere, El Pico employs a rough, neo-realistic style. The film was De la Iglesia's biggest box-office hit, and it spun off a sequel, El pico 2.

== Plot ==
Paco and Urko, two teenagers living in Bilbao in Spain, become best friends while attending the same academy. They come from different backgrounds. Paco has two younger sisters; his mother, Eulalia, is a traditional housewife; while his father, Evaristo Torrecuadrada, is a Civil Guard commander who holds right-wing views. Urko's parents are separated, and he lives with his father, Martín Aramendia, a leftist politician affiliated with one of the groups pushing for Basque autonomy. Unbeknown to their families, Paco and Urko are drug addicts. They hang out with Betty, a young Argentinian prostitute, who sleeps with both of them. In order to have the means to support their drug addiction, Betty puts them in contact with 'El Cojo' ("the lame one"), a drug dealer living in Barakaldo with his pregnant wife Pilar, who is also a heroin addict. El Cojo provides the two friends with drugs that they begin to sell. Paco also hangs out in secret with Mikel Orbea, a homosexual sculptor, who tries to warn him against the danger of using heavy drugs. Although Paco is heterosexual, he has had sex with Mikel in the past.

Evaristo Torrecuadrada is concerned about his wife, who is stricken with terminal ovarian cancer. He wishes that Paco would follow a military career, and as a gift for his son's eighteenth birthday, Torrecuadrada takes him to a bordello, but Paco arranges to be with Betty so the two lovers can keep the money for themselves. While returning home from buying medicines for his mother, Paco becomes a hero when he saves his father from an assassination attempt. However, Paco's life soon spirals out of control. His heavy drug use leads him to steal the morphine needed by his mother to relieve her pain. Confronted by his father about the disappearance of the medicines and the bloody marks on his arm, Paco confesses that he is a heroin addict. Paco's father is stunned. Father and son have an argument, and Paco flees the house. Mikel offers him shelter on condition that Paco stops using heavy drugs. Paco then goes into a painful withdrawal process.

Meanwhile, Paco's father wants to investigate who provided his son with drugs, while trying to locate Paco's whereabouts. He assigns Lieutenant Alcántara to the case. Alcántara uses rough methods to extract information from his sources. In this way, he comes to interrogate El Cojo and his wife. They have been police informants in the past and lead Alcántara to Urko, who tells about his and Paco's addiction and drug dealings. In spite of his political differences with Martín Aramendía, Torrecuadrada summons him, informing him about what has transpired with their sons. Urko tells his father that he thinks Paco might be hiding with Mikel.

When Commander Torrecuadrada finally meets Mikel, he asks him to tell Paco that his mother is dying and that she wishes to see him. Paco returns home to be with his mother in her final moments. After the funeral, Paco, completely free from drugs, decides to stay with his father and two younger sisters. Soon Paco looks for Urko, who also has recovered from his addiction. The two friends rekindle their friendship and go back to visit Betty, who is still hooked on heroin. After having sex with her, they can't resist the temptation and begin to use drugs once again. To get the heroin they crave, Paco and Urko go to visit El Cojo. Their plan is to rob him and take the money and drugs from him with the help of a gun Paco has stolen from his father. El Cojo is with his wife and their baby son. When assaulted, he opposes with violent resistance, and during the confrontation, Urko shoots him in the head. When Pilar yells out, Urko kills her too.

Lieutenant Alcántara immediately suspects Paco and Urko as the culprits in the killing of El Cojo and his wife, based on the ballistics of the gun and the witnesses' descriptions. While defending his son, Torrecuadrada communicates his suspicions to Aramendía. Paco and Urko go to Betty's place, where Urko overdoses on the stolen heroin and dies. At the morgue, while Torrecuadrada and Aramendía discuss telling the truth about what they know, Paco arrives to see the body of his dead friend. He cries and apologizes to Aramendía. Paco's father takes him to a deserted road by the sea and asks him to give him the stolen gun and the drugs, throwing them away into the ocean. Now there is no evidence that can be used against Paco.

== Cast ==
- José Luis Manzano as Paco
- Javier García as Urko
- José Manuel Cervino as Evaristo Torrecuadrada
- Luis Iriondo as Martín Aramendía
- Enrique San Francisco as Mikel Orbea
- Andrea Albani as Betty
- Ovidi Montllor as Lopez Garcia alias El Cojo
- Queta Ariel as Eulalia
- Marta Molins as Pilar
- Pedro Nieva Parola as Lieutenant Alcántara
