= Street Warriors II =

- Theatrical release poster
- Spanish: Perros callejeros 2: Busca y captura
- Directed by: José Antonio de la Loma
- Screenplay by: José Antonio de la Loma
- Starring: Ángel Fernández Franco; Verónica Miriel; Raúl Ramírez; Reyes Poveda; Conrado Tortosa; Isabel Mestres; Teresa Giménez
- Cinematography: Juan Gelpí
- Production companies: Films Zodiaco; Prozesa
- Distributed by: CB Films
- Release date: 8 October 1979
- Country: Spain
- Language: Spanish

Street Warriors II (Spanish: Perros callejeros 2: Busca y captura, lit. 'street dogs II: search and arrest') is a 1979 Spanish quinqui film written and directed by José Antonio de la Loma and the direct meta-sequel to Street Warriors (1977). It stars Ángel Fernández Franco.

== Plot ==
The plot follows the juvenile delinquent Torete, including his car and sexual exploits, as he is chased by a cop resenftul because he left him lame with his car who charges him with murder. Although he prepares an alibi with help from his friends, he is wounded during a riot at the Modelo Prison.

== Cast ==
- Ángel Fernández Franco as Ángel
- Verónica Miriel as Verónica
- Raúl Ramírez as Fernando
- Reyes Poveda as Tony
- Conrado Tortosa
- Isabel Mestres
- Teresa Giménez as Charo
- Grace Renat as Gumer
- José Febles as el Chino
- César Sánchez as el Choto
- Antonio Maroño as Sebastián
- Bernard Seray as el Vaquilla
- Pep Corominas as el Pijo
- Agustí Villaronga

== Production ==
The film was produced by Zodíaco and Prozesa. Ángel Fernández Franco "Torete" reportedly signed a clause in his contract stipulating that he would not receive a salary if he got into trouble with the law.

The soundtrack featured Los Chunguitos' songs "Ven por favor", "Como yegua brava", "Para que no me olvides", and "Perros callejeros".

== Release ==
The film was released theatrically in Spain on 8 October 1979.

== See also ==
- List of Spanish films of 1979
