= Pol Turrents =

Spanish cinematographer and streamer

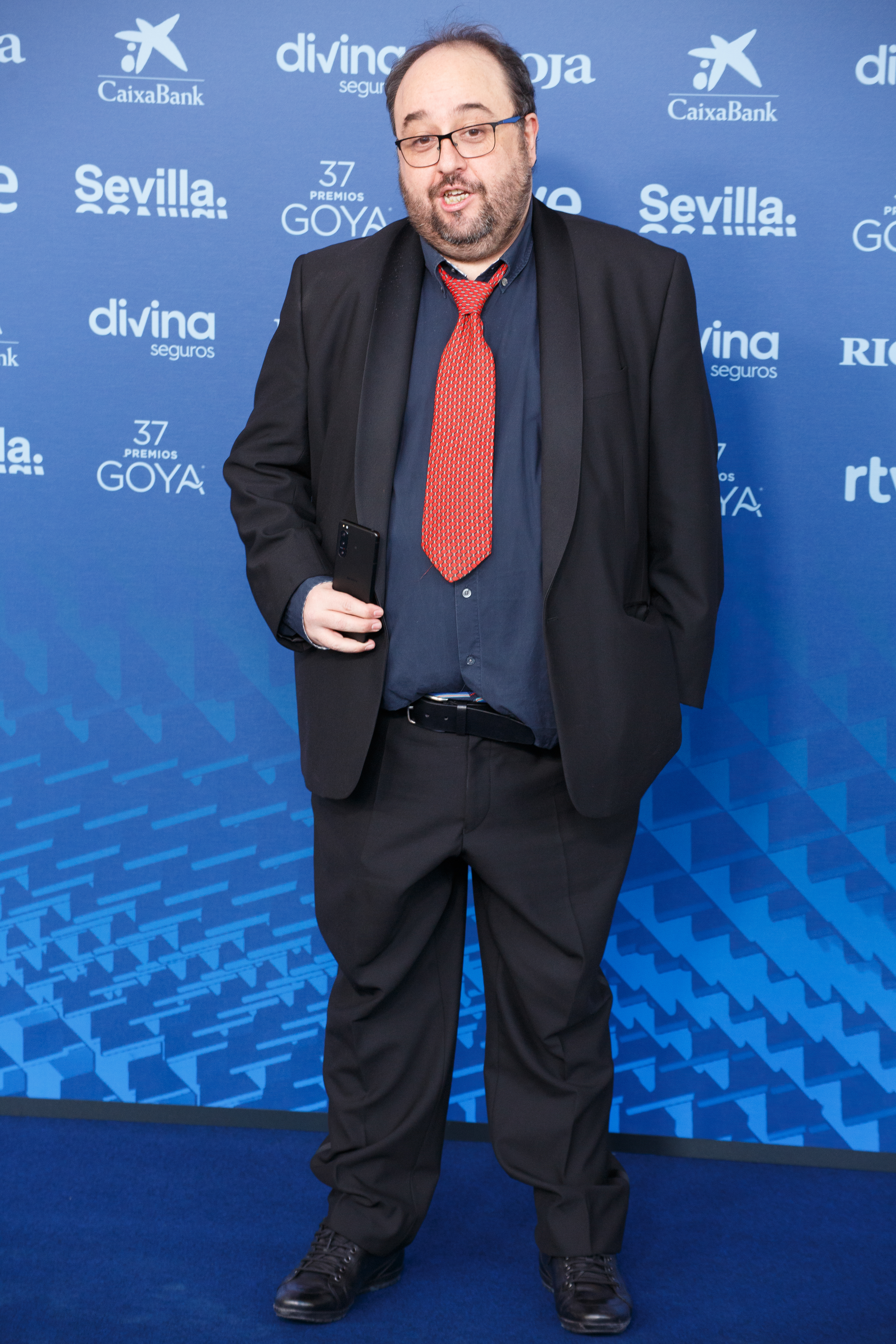
- Pol at 37th Goya Awards
- Born: Pol Turrents Alonso; July 10, 1976 (age 50); Esplugues de Llobregat, Barcelona
- Occupations: Cinematographer; Twitch streamer

Twitch information
- Channel: Polispol1
- Followers: 1.228.312 thousand

Pol Turrents Alonso (Catalan: [ˈpɔl tuˈrens]; born 10 July 1976), known as Polispol, is a Spanish cinematographer and teacher who works on short films, videoclips and TV. He has also worked in feature films such as Xtrems, by Joan Riedweg and Abel Folk, Negro Buenos Aires, by Ramón Termens, Salvador (Puig Antich) and Como mariposas en la luz.

In 1990 he worked in Clot TV and made indie and fiction films. He then worked in Vía Digital, tv3 and TVE making documentaries. In 1999 he specialized in HD technologies, a pioneer in Spain alongside Rafa Roche, and also an innovator in Europe with 3D retransmissions.

In 2022 he directed Venus, a film adaptation by Víctor Conde, and starring Antonio Hortelano, Ariana Bruguera, Paula Muñoz, Carlos Serrano, Carlos Gorbe, Lolita and Juan Diego. On 1 December 2022 he received the For You Fest award alongside laurixgames, which recognises the most distinguished content creators.

Since 2020 he makes live streamings on Twitch.
