= Poodle (film) =

- Film poster
- Spanish: Caniche
- Directed by: Bigas Luna
- Written by: Bigas Luna
- Starring: Àngel Jové; Consol Tura; Linda Pérez Gallardo
- Cinematography: Pedro Aznar
- Edited by: Anastasi Rinos
- Production company: Figaró Films
- Distributed by: Universal Films Española
- Release dates: May 1979 (Cannes); 8 June 1979 (Spain)
- Country: Spain
- Language: Spanish

Poodle (Spanish: Caniche) is a 1979 Spanish drama film written directed by Bigas Luna. It stars Àngel Jové, Consol Tura, and Linda Pérez Gallardo.

== Plot ==
The plot follows siblings Bernardo and Eloísa, living in a rickety mansion in Barcelona with the poodle Dany, with Bernardo being jealous of the attention the dog receives from Eloísa, who treats the poodle as if it were a person. Bored in the building, they engage into the activity of butchering, penetrating, and eating stray dogs.

== Cast ==
- Àngel Jové as Bernardo
- Consol Tura as Eloísa
- Linda Pérez Gallardo as Dani
- Cruz Tobar as Alberto
- Sara Grey as tía Lina ('aunt Lina')
- Marta Molins as Carmen

== Production ==
Bigas Luna retrospectively acknowledged that shooting the film was not a good experience for his then wife Consol Tura.

== Release ==
The film screened in the Directors' Fortnight sidebar section of the 1979 Cannes Film Festival. It was released theatrically in Spain on 8 June 1979.

== Reception ==
The film landed a mixed reception. It also proved to be controversial, featuring polemic bestiality scenes.

Jesús Fernández Santos of El País lamented that the film never manages to take flight, and the story "never becomes sarcastic, nor does the anecdote transcend beyond the noirish tale to take on authentic dramatic status".

Also reviewing for El País, Luis Martínez wrote that Biga Luna builds an "accurate profile of vomit" that "becomes something internal, dense, almost tangible, both metaphor and insult".

== See also ==
- List of Spanish films of 1979
