= Antonio Hortelano =

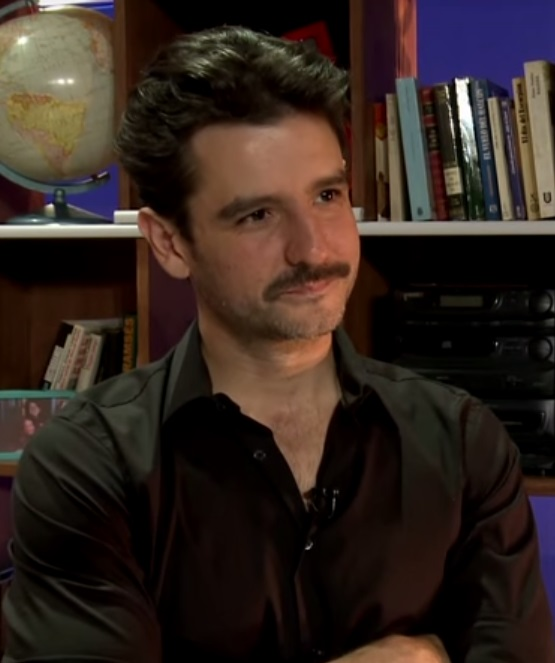
- Hortelano in 2013
- Born: Antonio Hortelano Hontanga; 16 September 1975 (age 49); Valencia, Spain
- Occupations: Actor; theatre director

Antonio Hortelano Hontanga (born 16 September 1975) is a Spanish actor and theatre director. He became popular in the late 1990s in Spain for his role in the television series Compañeros.

== Life and career ==
Antonio Hortelano Hontanga was born in Valencia on 16 September 1975. He landed his television debut in 1986 in Turno de oficio, followed by other minor television roles in Médico de familia, Más que amigos, and Manos a la obra. Hortelano landed his big screen debut in a starring role in El seductor (1995) alongside María Barranco. For his role as bad boy Joaquín "Quimi" Verdet in 94 episodes of the television series Compañeros and the spin-off film No te fallaré (2000), he became very popular in Spain. His film career continued in the 2000s with credits in Más de mil cámaras velan por tu seguridad (2003), The Witch Affair (2003), Diario de una becaria (2004), Desde que amanece apetece (2005), and Condón Express (2005).

For his theatre debut, he featured in the play Olvida los tambores directed by Víctor Conde, which premiered at the Teatro La Latina on 20 September 2007. From then on he leaned on the stage scene, with participations in plays such as Burundanga, Nuestras mujeres, Dos más dos, La fuerza del cariño, and La Cuenta. He also appeared in television series such as SMS, Punta Escarlata, El don de Alba, and Sin identidad.

He made his directorial theatre debut in 2020 with Llámame. In 2023, he made a return to film with a role in Víctor Conde's Venus.
