= Cuadrilátero =

- Theatrical release poster
- Directed by: Eloy de la Iglesia
- Screenplay by: Antonio Fos; Bautista Lacasa
- Produced by: Arturo Marcos
- Starring: José María Prada; Rosana Yanny; Deane Selmier; José Legrá
- Cinematography: Leopoldo Villaseñor
- Music by: Jesús Franco y Daniel White
- Production company: Federal Pictures
- Release date: 6 July 1970
- Running time: 89 minutes
- Country: Spain
- Language: Spanish
- Box office: ESP 3,505,784 (Spain)

Cuadrilátero (English: Boxing ring) is a 1970 Spanish boxing-themed film directed by Eloy de la Iglesia and starring José María Prada, Deane Selmier and Rosana Yanny.

== Cast ==
- Dean Selmier as Miguel Valdés
- José Legra as José Laguna
- Rosanna Yanni as Elena
- José María Prada
- Irene Daina as Olga
- María Luisa San José as prostitute
- Pilar Cansino as Estrella
