= Street Warriors (film) =

1977 film by José Antonio de la Loma

- Spanish: Perros callejeros
- Directed by: José Antonio de la Loma
- Screenplay by: José Antonio de la Loma
- Release date: 24 December 1977
- Running time: 103 minutes
- Country: Spain
- Language: Spanish

Street Warriors (Spanish: Perros callejeros, lit. 'street dogs') is a 1977 Spanish film directed by José Antonio de la Loma, known for being the seminal title of the cine quinqui ('delinquency cinema') genre in vogue in post-Francoist Spain. The story is inspired by the adventures of the famous delinquent Juan José Moreno Cuenca (1961–2003; also known as el Vaquilla).

== Plot ==
The film is about a gang of teenage car thieves from the suburbs of Barcelona. The delinquents have various run-ins with the law and mistreat women. The main character, El Torete, is 15 years old.

== Cast ==
The main actors were not professional actors. The cast included:

- Ángel Fernández Franco as el Torete
- Nadia Windel as Isabel
- Miguel Ugal Cuenca as el Pijo
- César Sánchez as el Fitipaldi
- Rebeca Romer as Casilda
- Luis Martínez as el Mosque
- Víctor Petit as Manolo
- Frank Braña as el Esquinao
- Xabier Elorriaga as Padre Ignacio
- Marta Flores
- Alfonso Zambrano as inspector

== Release ==
The film saw its theatrical release on 24 December 1977.

== Reception ==
The film was a box office hit.

Fernando Trueba writing for El País said that while the cinematography was terrible that the film had a strong feel of authenticity.

Cinemanía describes the film as having aged very badly, while still being a good reflection of the times.

== Later films ==
Perros callejeros is the first in a trilogy:

- Perros callejeros (1977)
- Perros callejeros II (1979)
- Los últimos golpes de El Torete (1980)

In total the director made a series of five quinqui films. The other in the series are:

- Yo, el Vaquilla (1985)
- Perras callejeras (1985)

== See also ==
- List of Spanish films of 1977

== Bibliography ==
- Whittaker, Tom (2020). The Spanish quinqui film. Delinquency, sound, sensation. Manchester: Manchester University Press. ISBN 978-1-5261-3177-5.
