= The Glass Ceiling =

- Theatrical release poster
- Directed by: Eloy de la Iglesia
- Written by: Antonio Fos; Eloy de la Iglesia
- Produced by: Rafael del Valle Iturriaga
- Starring: Carmen Sevilla; Dean Selmier; Patty Shepard
- Cinematography: Francisco Fraile
- Edited by: Pablo G. del Amo
- Music by: Ángel Arteaga
- Production company: Fono España
- Distributed by: Delta
- Release date: 3 May 1971
- Running time: 92 minutes
- Country: Spain
- Language: Spanish
- Box office: ESP 30,996,128 (Spain)

The Glass Ceiling (Spanish:El techo de cristal) is a 1971 psychological thriller film, written and directed by Eloy de la Iglesia. It stars Carmen Sevilla, Dean Selmier and Patty Shepard.

The plot follows a bored housewife who begins to suspect that her upstairs neighbor killed her invalid husband. Sevilla won a major award in her home country (the Cinema Writers Circle Award) for this performance.

The film is somewhat inspired by Alfred Hitchcock's Rear Window (1954) and the paranoia classic George Cukor's Gaslight (1944). The film was a commercial success.

== Plot ==
Martha is an attractive housewife living in a small rural apartment house on the outskirts of Madrid. Her husband, Carlos, leaves frequently on business trips so Martha spends most of her time alone, with her pet cat, Fedra, as her only companion. While Carlos is away, Martha hears heavy footsteps in the apartment above her. Her sexy upstairs neighbor, Julia, is in a similar situation. Victor, Julia's husband, happens to be away this time as well. After overhearing a few things, Martha, already prone to fantasizing away her boredom and loneliness, begins to suspect that Julia has killed her sick husband. Julia claims that Victor left for business reasons. Martha does not believe her and begins to investigate. She soon discovers that nobody has seen Julia's husband leaving town which seems to confirm Martha's theory. Adding to Martha's suspicions, Julia keeps asking to put things in her fridge, even though her own refrigerator is clearly working. On top of this, someone is secretly feeding something to the landlord's dogs. When Rita, Matha's close friend, stops for a visit with her young daughter, Yolanda, Martha tells her that she thinks Julia has a lover and that they both had killed Victor. Unfortunately the imprudent Yolanda tells Julia that Martha said that she had a lover.

The building's landlord, Ricardo, a sculptor and artist living downstairs, works on his sculptures and pottery when he is not fussing over his dogs and pigs. He has piqued the interest of Rosa, the young daughter of a farmer, who delivers milk there every morning to the various tenants. Though Ricardo does not discourage Rosa's attentions, he finds himself being drawn to Martha instead. Pedro, a grocery delivery man, also seems to have a thing for Martha and may be having an affair with Julia. When Martha firmly rebuffs Pedro's advances, Pedro threatens her. Meanwhile, someone is spying on and taking provocative pictures of all three of the women.

Ultimately, it is revealed that Martha's husband Carlos has been having an affair with Julia, and that he killed Julia's husband with the agreement that Julia would then kill Martha. However, as Julia and Carlos are about to kill Martha, Ricardo arrives and shoots Carlos dead. Ricardo exchanges a knowing glance with Julia, and the voyeuristic photos appear onscreen, indicating that Ricardo was the photographer.

== Cast ==
- Carmen Sevilla as Marta
- Dean Selmier as Ricardo
- Patty Shepard as Julia
- Emma Cohen as Rosa
- Fernando Cebrián as Carlos
- Encarna Paso as Rita
- Rafael Hernández as Padre
- Javier De Campos as Empleado
- Patricia Cealot
- Hugo Blanco as Delivery Man

== Bibliography ==
- Mira, Alberto. The A to Z of Spanish Cinema. Rowman & Littlefield, 2010.
- D’Lugo, Marvin. Guide to the Cinema of Spain. Greenwood Press, 1997. ISBN 0-313-29474-7
