= El sacerdote =

- Theatrical release poster
- Directed by: Eloy de la Iglesia
- Screenplay by: Enrique Barreiro
- Produced by: Óscar Guarido; Carlos Goyanes
- Starring: Simón Andreu; Emilio Gutiérrez Caba; Esperanza Roy
- Cinematography: Magín Torruella
- Edited by: Julio Peña
- Music by: Carmelo A. Bernaola
- Release date: 1 May 1978
- Running time: 109 min
- Country: Spain
- Language: Spanish

El Sacerdote (English: The Priest) is a 1978 Spanish film directed by Eloy de la Iglesia and starring Simón Andreu, Emilio Gutiérrez Caba and Esperanza Roy. The plot centres around a Catholic priest who suffers a personal crisis when his sexuality is suddenly awakened. Unable to reconcile his deep conservative religious faith with his sexual obsession, he spirals into a path of self-punishment. The script was first offered to Pilar Miró.

== Plot ==
Father Miguel is a conservative thirty-six-year-old Catholic priest. In the changing Spain of 1966, Miguel's religious community tries to implement the doctrines given by the Second Vatican Council and adapt to the new realities of the country. Father Miguel opposes any form of religious modernization. He clashes with Father Luis, a fellow priest of his community who employs more modern tactics of religious instruction. Miguel begins to experience a personal crisis when his repressed sexuality is awaken by a road sign, displaying a beautiful woman wearing a provocative bikini. He begins to be constantly tormented by sexual thoughts. His sexuality is further aroused by Antonia, a beautiful married woman in her thirties, who in her confessions tells father Miguel about her intense sexual encounters with her husband. Antonia's confessions disturb father Miguel even more. He thinks about sex all the time to the point of impairing his work as a priest.

In his disturbed state of mind, father Miguel seeks advice from the more worldly and modern father Luis. Miguel entered religious life at age fourteen and, unlike Father Luis, never had sexual experiences with women. However Miguel feels ashamed asking about sex and he tells Luis to forget the matter before revealing what is tormenting him.

Alarmed by Miguel's behavior, father Alfonso, the leader of the congregation, separates father Miguel from normal services to the community. Antonia is given a new confessor while Miguel is placed in charge of classes at the local school. He begins to give religious instruction to children who are getting ready for their first communion. However, Miguel's sexual obsessions continue. Even the sight of one of the young boys playing with a pellet between his thighs brings sexual images to Miguel's mind. To calm down his sexual desires, Miguel resorts to penitence and self-flagellation, punishing his own flesh with a cilice. This weakens his health.

The boy is Antonia's son, and Miguel sees her again during the child's first communion. Seeing her with her husband, Miguel imagines Antonia having sex with her husband as she used to describe to him during confession. Miguel visits a bar, makes arrangements to have sex with a prostitute, but backs down at the last minute. He is so disturbed by his sexuality, he falls sick. Father Francisco sends him to recuperate at his native village where Miguel's widow mother still lives.

Once in his hometown father Miguel begins to recover his strength. While visiting his mother, he walks across town and remembers events from his childhood. His irascible father who beat him mercilessly and the sexual adventures of his classmates, who went skinny dipping in a river, compared the size of their penises and had sex with a farm animal.

Back in the city and his religious community things have changed. One of the priests had a girlfriend and has left the order to marry her. Miguel seems initially better, but he is still tormented by constant sexual thoughts. He again sees Antonia, whose marriage is not going well. She wants to divorce her husband. Miguel visits her at her house. Antonia tells him that all along she has been in love with him. Her confessions were aimed to arouse Miguel's interest. Miguel and Antonia have sex, but he is overwhelmed by guilt for what he has done. During Christmas celebrations Miguel, tormented and deeply disturbed, locks himself in his room. He uses garden scissors to castrate himself.

Miguel survives his castration. He is sent to a mental institution. Once deemed healthy again he returns to his community where many things have changed. He sees Antonia once again. She is now separated from her husband and would like to rekindle their relationship. Miguel tells her that is too late for that. Finally at ease, Miguel leaves his religious life and his community. He has lost his faith.

== Cast ==
- Simón Andreu – Father Miguel
- Emilio Gutiérrez Caba – Father Luis
- Esperanza Roy – Irene
- José Franco – Father Alfonso
- Ramón Reparaz – Father Manuel
- José Vivó - Bishop
- África Pratt - Prostitute
- Queta Claver - Miguel's mother
