= Juan Diego (actor) =

Spanish actor (1942–2022)

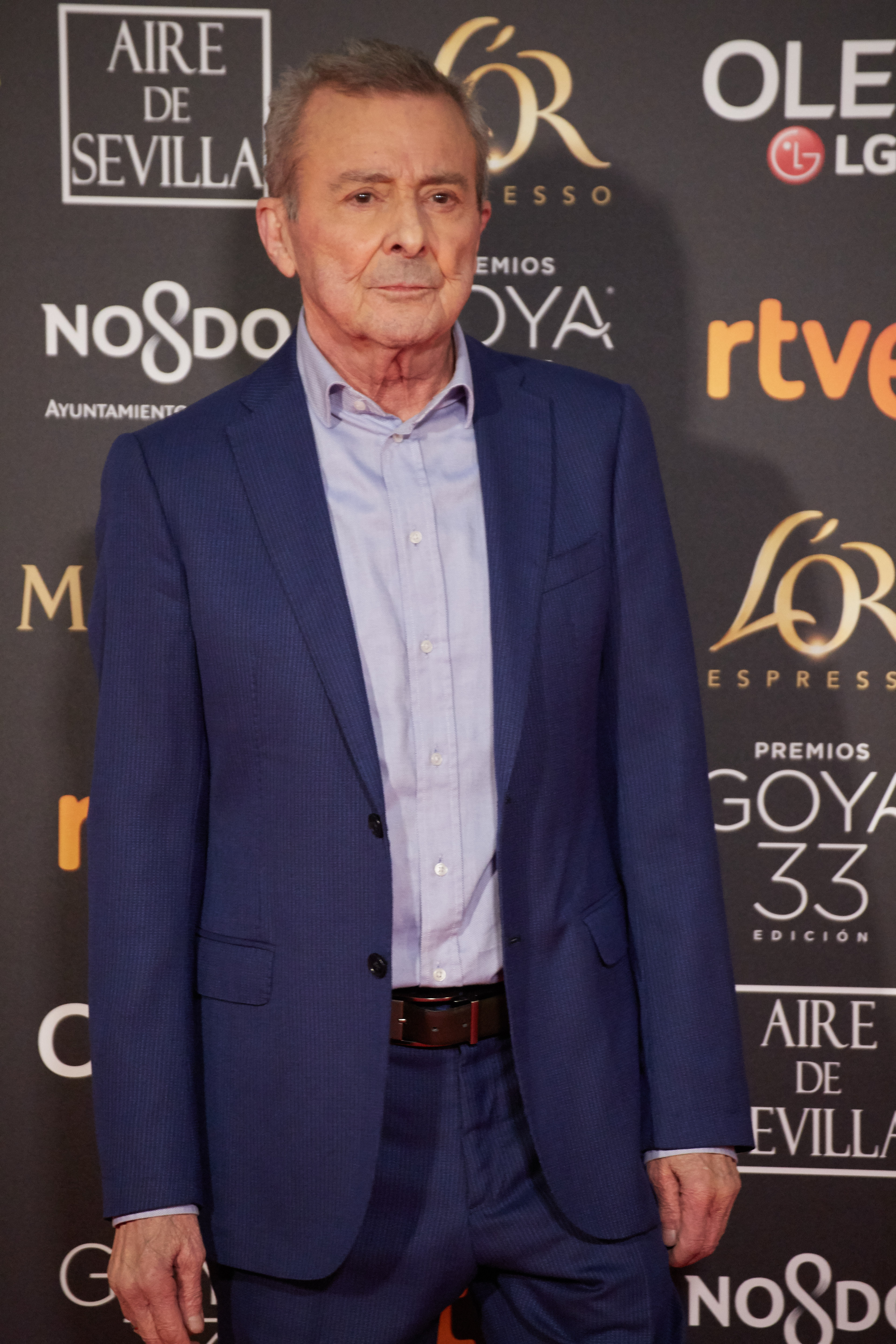
- Juan Diego in 2019
- Born: Juan Diego Ruiz Moreno; 14 December 1942; Bormujos, Spain
- Died: 28 April 2022 (aged 79); Madrid, Spain
- Occupation: Actor
- Children: 2

Juan Diego Ruiz Moreno (14 December 1942 – 28 April 2022), professionally known as Juan Diego, was a Spanish actor who appeared on stage, in television and film productions since 1957. He starred in films such as The Holy Innocents, The 7th Day, Dragon Rapide, París-Tombuctú and You're the One.

Performing with a raspy voice for much of his career, he is often associated with abrupt, violent, and authoritarian roles, having a knack for nailing fascist-like characters. His most known television role was the foul-mouthed Don Lorenzo in Los hombres de Paco, popular for the idiom ¡Mis santos cojones!

Also known for his left-wing political activism, Juan Diego took part in the struggle for advancing film workers' labor rights in Spain.

== Biography ==
Juan Diego Ruiz Moreno was born on 14 December 1942 in Bormujos, and spent his childhood there. He made his acting debut in theatre in 1957. Key stage credits throughout his career include performances in plays such as Olvida los tambores, El lector por horas, La gata sobre el tejado de zinc, and Yo me bajo en la próxima, ¿y usted?

After studying performing arts in Seville, Juan Diego moved to Madrid in order to develop his acting career, featuring in Televisión Española shows (most notably in plenty of Estudio 1 plays), likewise making his film debut in Eloy de la Iglesia's Fantasía... 3 (1966).

Having joined the then clandestine Communist Party of Spain in the late 1960s, Juan Diego had a leading role in organizing the 1975 Spanish actors strike. The first of his two children was born in 1970. His left-wing political activism did not end upon the death of dictator Francisco Franco, but continued during the Transition and beyond. Decades later, he would also be seen demonstrating in Spain against the Iraq War.

Diego starred as Marcos, a popular television host and member of a post-Francoist party (and scorned husband), alongside Ana Belén and a big black dog in a love triangle in the 1977 zoophilia-themed film La criatura.

He landed a breakthrough role with his performance in Mario Camus' 1984 film The Holy Innocents, playing Señorito Iván, a repulsive authoritarian landlord from an Extremaduran cortijo, obsessed with game hunting and disdainful of his workers. He earned his first Goya Award nomination at the first edition of the awards celebrated in 1987, for his leading role as Francisco Franco in the period drama Dragon Rapide, which tracks the early stages of the Spanish Civil War. He portrayed a moor in the film The Bastard Brother of God. He earned another best actor nomination for his role as Saint John of the Cross in the 1989 film The Dark Night, his first collaboration with Carlos Saura.

He played a señorito again twice in 1988: in the film Jarrapellejos, as Saturnino, a rapist and murderer, and in the ensemble comedy Pasodoble. He portrayed another historical figure by playing the title character of the 1991 Mexican film Cabeza de Vaca. He won his first Goya Award for his supporting role in The Dumbfounded King (1991), playing Father Villaescusa, a 17th-century scheming friar characterised by his "arrogant, enervated, and irascible" gaze. He featured in supporting roles in the 1992 film Jamón, jamón and in the 1993 film Banderas, the Tyrant, respectively portraying Manuel, the owner of the Sansón underwear factory and father of José Luis (Jordi Mollá), and the licenciado Nacho Veguillas, a sycophant pandering to megalomaniac dictator Santos Banderas, portrayed by Gian Maria Volonté.

Juan Diego appeared in Luis García Berlanga's last full-length film París-Tombuctú (1999), playing the anarchic nudist Boronat, a role that won him his second Goya Award for Best Supporting Actor. He starred as the title character in the 2002 television miniseries Padre coraje, directed by Benito Zambrano, in a story based on true events in which Juan Diego's character enters the underworld to find those responsible for the murder of his son.

Juan Diego's supporting performance in the 2003 comedy Torremolinos 73 as Don Carlos, a porn film producer, landed him another Goya award nomination. Another of his collaborations with Carlos Saura, his supporting performance in the 2004 film The 7th Day portraying Antonio Izquierdo (an illiterate man and co-perpetrator of the Puerto Hurraco massacre), earned him Goya award nominations in consecutive years.

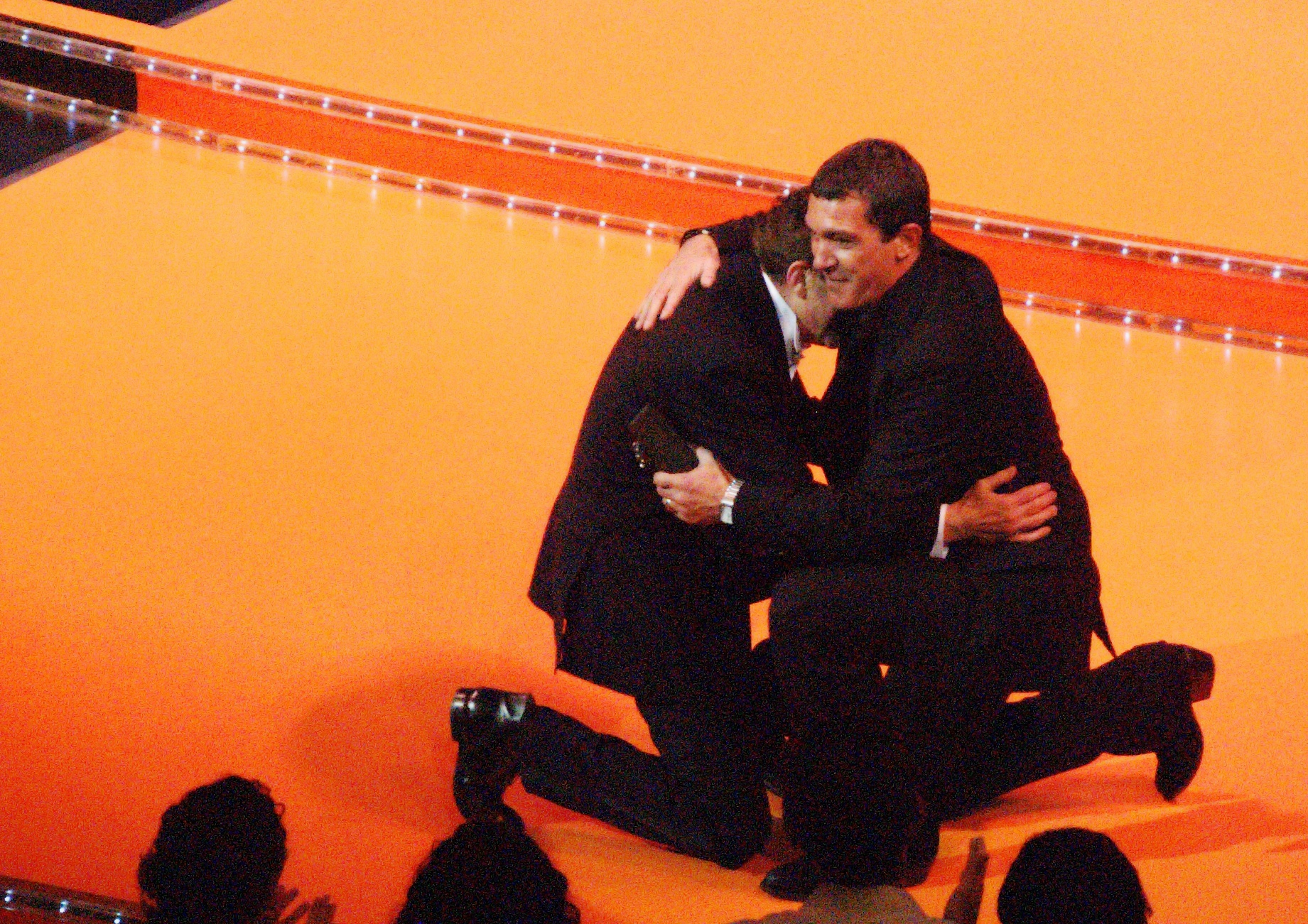
Juan Diego alongside Antonio Banderas at the 2009 Málaga Film Festival.

The television role earning Juan Diego the most public recognition was that of the foul-mouthed Don Lorenzo in the crime comedy-drama television series Los hombres de Paco, whose original broadcasting run spanned from 2005 to 2010. The series was picked up for a revival in 2020, leading up to the release of new episodes in 2021 featuring Juan Diego in a recurring role.

Juan Diego won his only Goya Award for Best Leading Actor (and third overall) for his performance in Víctor García León's 2006 drama Go Away from Me, playing an aging thespian and father to a freeloading son portrayed by Juan Diego Botto.

In his later career, Juan Diego often worked for newcoming directors in films such as Nightfall in India (2014), Can't Say Goodbye (2017), The Cover (2021), or Víctor Conde's Venus, a posthumously released work. He also featured in the 2011 political thriller 17 Hours playing general Alfonso Armada, a member of the clique of officers who plotted the 1981 attempted coup d'état in Spain; in the 2012 drama Todo es silencio, portraying Mariscal, a local cacique with a grip over maritime smuggling; in the 2017 Catalan period drama Uncertain Glory, playing Cagorcio, the abusive father of femme fatale Carlana; and in the martial arts film Xtreme (2021), playing Ricardo, an aging crime lord.

Juan Diego died at Clínica de la Zarzuela in Madrid on 28 April 2022. Many fellow actors and friends attended his lying in repose at the Teatro Español, including Marisa Paredes, Ana Belén, Víctor Manuel, Imanol Arias, Gabino Diego, Eduard Fernández, Manolo Solo, Emilio Gutiérrez Caba, Carmelo Gómez, Mariano Barroso, and María José Goyanes.

== Filmography ==
=== Film ===
| Year | Title | Role | Notes | Ref. |
|---|---|---|---|---|
| 1966 | Fantasía... 3 | Tomasín | Feature film debut | |
| 1969 | Algo amargo en la boca (Something Bitter in the Mouth) | César | | |
| 1976 | Emilia... parada y fonda | Jaime | | |
| 1976 | El buscón | Diego Coronel | | |
| 1977 | La criatura | Marcos | | |
| 1984 | Los santos inocentes (The Holy Innocents) | Señorito Iván | | |
| 1985 | La corte de Faraón (The Court of the Pharaoh) | Roberto | | |
| 1985 | Los paraísos perdidos (The Lost Paradise) | Minister of Culture | Character identified with Javier Solana | |
| 1986 | El viaje a ninguna parte (Voyage to Nowhere) | Sergio Maldonado / Juan Conejo | | |
| 1986 | Dragon Rapide | Francisco Franco | | |
| 1988 | Jarrapellejos | Saturnino | | |
| 1988 | Pasodoble | Juan Luis | | |
| 1989 | La noche oscura (The Dark Night) | San Juan de la Cruz | | |
| 1991 | Cabeza de Vaca | Cabeza de Vaca | | |
| 1991 | La noche más larga (The Longest Night) | Fiscal militar Menéndez | | |
| 1991 | El rey pasmado (The Dumbfounded King) | Padre Villaescusa | | |
| 1992 | Jamón, jamón | Manuel | | |
| 1992 | El beso del sueño | Salvatierra | | |
| 1993 | Tirano Banderas (Banderas, the Tyrant) | Nacho Veguillas | | |
| 1998 | Yerma | Juan | | |
| 1999 | Entre las piernas (Between Your Legs) | Jareño | | |
| 1999 | París-Tombuctú | Boronat | | |
| 2000 | El invierno de las anjanas (The Winter of the Fairies) | Germán | | |
| 2000 | Fugitivas (Fugitives) | Raimundo | | |
| 2000 | You're the One | Don Matías | | |
| 2002 | Smoking Room | Sotomayor | | |
| 2002 | La virgen de la lujuria (The Virgin of Lust) | Gimeno-Mikado | | |
| 2003 | Torremolinos 73 | Don Carlos | | |
| 2004 | La vida que te espera (Your Next Life) | Gildo | | |
| 2004 | El séptimo día (The 7th Day) | Antonio Izquierdo | | |
| 2004 | María querida (Dearest Maria) | Luis | | |
| 2006 | Vete de mí (Go Away from Me) | Santiago | | |
| 2006 | Remake | Damián | | |
| 2008 | Casual Day | José Antonio | | |
| 2010 | Que se mueran los feos (To Hell with the Ugly) | Auxilio | | |
| 2010 | Lope (The Outlaw) | Jerónimo Velázquez | | |
| 2011 | 23-F: la película (17 Hours) | Alfonso Armada | | |
| 2012 | Todo es silencio (All Is Silence) | Mariscal | | |
| 2012 | Insensibles (Painless) | Adán Martel (old) | Young version of the character is portrayed by Félix Gómez | |
| 2014 | Anochece en la India (Nightfall in India) | Ricardo | | |
| 2017 | Incerta glòria (Uncertain Glory) | Cagorcio | | |
| 2017 | No sé decir adiós (Can't Say Goodbye) | José Luis | | |
| 2017 | Oro (Gold) | Manuel Requena | | |
| 2021 | Xtremo (Xtreme) | Ricardo | | |
| 2021 | El cover (The Cover) | Daniel, El guitarras | | |
| 2023 | Venus | Padre de Jorge ('Jorge's father') | Posthumously released | |
| 2024 | Historias (Stories) | | Posthumously released | |

=== Television ===
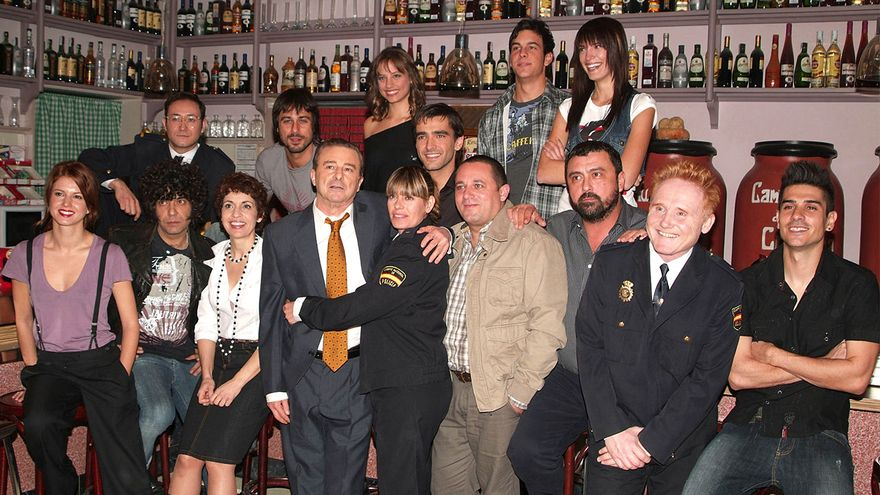
Juan Diego together with the rest of the cast of Los hombres de Paco's season 5.

| Year | Title | Role | Notes | Ref |
|---|---|---|---|---|
| 1986 | Segunda enseñanza | Jandro | | |
| 1986 | Turno de oficio | Padre Rafael | | |
| 1994 | Historias de la puta mili | Coronel | | |
| 2002 | Padre coraje | Antonio Delgado | Miniseries | |
| 2005–21 | Los hombres de Paco | Don Lorenzo | Main (S. 1–9); recurring (S. 10) | |
| 2012 | Toledo, cruce de destinos | Rey Alfonso el Sabio | | |

== Accolades ==
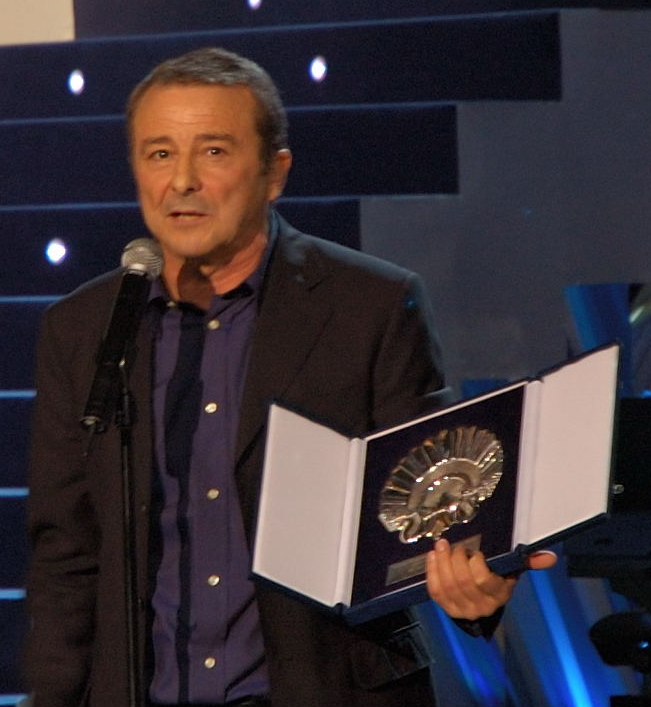
Juan Diego holding his Silver Shell for Best Actor trophy earned at the 2006 San Sebastián Film Festival.

| Year | Award | Category | Work | Result | Ref. |
|---|---|---|---|---|---|
| 1987 | 1st Goya Awards | Best Actor | Dragon Rapide | Nominated | |
| 1990 | 4th Goya Awards | Best Actor | The Dark Night | Nominated | |
| 1992 | 6th Goya Awards | Best Supporting Actor | The Dumbfounded King | Won | |
| 2000 | 14th Goya Awards | Best Supporting Actor | París-Tombuctú | Won | |
| 2001 | 15th Goya Awards | Best Supporting Actor | You're the One | Nominated | |
| 2002 | 5th Málaga Film Festival | Silver Biznaga for Best Actor | Smoking Room | Won | |
| 2003 | 12th Actors and Actresses Union Awards | Best Television Actor in a Leading Role | Padre coraje | Won | |
| 2004 | 18th Goya Awards | Best Supporting Actor | Torremolinos 73 | Nominated | |
| 2005 | 19th Goya Awards | Best Supporting Actor | The 7th Day | Nominated | |
| 2005 | 14th Actors and Actresses Union Awards | Best Film Actor in a Secondary Role | The 7th Day | Nominated | |
| 2006 | 9th Málaga Film Festival | Silver Biznaga for Best Actor | El triunfo | Won | |
| 2006 | 54th San Sebastián International Film Festival | Silver Shell for Best Actor | Go Away from Me | Won | |
| 2007 | 21st Goya Awards | Best Actor | Go Away from Me | Won | |
| 2007 | 16th Actors and Actresses Union Awards | Best Film Actor in a Leading Role | Go Away from Me | Won | |
| 2011 | 20th Actors and Actresses Union Awards | Best Film Actor in a Minor Role | The Outlaw | Nominated | |
| 2012 | 26th Goya Awards | Best Supporting Actor | 17 Hours | Nominated | |
| 2014 | 17th Málaga Film Festival | Silver Biznaga for Best Actor | Nightfall in India | Won | |
| 2017 | 20th Málaga Film Festival | Silver Biznaga for Best Actor | Can't Say Goodbye | Won | |
| 2018 | 23rd Forqué Awards | Best Actor | Can't Say Goodbye | Nominated | |
| 2018 | 5th Feroz Awards | Best Supporting Actor | Can't Say Goodbye | Nominated | |
| 2018 | 27th Actors and Actresses Union Awards | Best Film Actor in a Secondary Role | Can't Say Goodbye | Won | |
| 2018 | 27th Actors and Actresses Union Awards | Best Film Actor in a Minor Role | Gold | Nominated | |
