= Quinqui (film genre) =

Spanish film genre

Cine quinqui or cine kinki (meaning "delinquency cinema") is a Spanish exploitation film genre that was most popular at the end of the 1970s and in the 1980s.

== Features ==
The films were centered on underclass delinquents, drugs, and love, and usually starred non-professional actors picked off the street. The most representative directors of the genre are José Antonio de la Loma and Eloy de la Iglesia, even if other directors such as Carlos Saura, Manuel Gutiérrez Aragón and Vicente Aranda also reproduced the quinqui social imaginaries in some of their films.

Quinqui films focused on marginalized working-class adolescents in the outskirts of Spanish cities involved in small-scale robbery and street crime. They showed raw violence, explicit sex, police brutality, and commonly depicted heroin use.

The genre draws inspiration from Italian neorealism and the French New Wave. Several of the stars of quinqui cinema would go on to die prematurely, most due to heroin use but some of AIDS. Some of them include José Luis Manzano (prostitute at age 16, died from overdose at age 30), El Pirri (heroin user at age 14, found dead in a wasteland at age 23), El Torete (died from AIDS, age 31), José Antonio Valdelomar (died from heroin overdose, around age 44), and Sonia Martínez (heroin consumer, died from AIDS complications at age 30).

In terms of its political-ideological leanings, José Luis López Sangüesa distinguishes three types of quinqui films: those representative of a Catholic paternalism (de la Loma's films and Klimovsky's ¿Y ahora qué, señor fiscal?), those representative of a Left disenchanted with the Transition (Eloy de la Iglesia's films and to a lesser extent Saura's Deprisa, deprisa and Raúl Peña's Todos me llaman Gato), and a quinqui strand that could be discursively categorized as extreme right-wing or sociological Francoism (embodied by pictures such as Juventud drogada, Chocolate, and La patria del Rata).

== Notable films ==
- Perros callejeros (1977)
- Perros callejeros II: Búsqueda y captura (1979)
- Navajeros (1980)
- Deprisa, deprisa (1981)
- Colegas (1982)
- El pico (1983)
- What Have I Done to Deserve This? (1984)
- Perras callejeras (1985)
- Yo, el Vaquilla (1985)
- La estanquera de Vallecas (1987)
- El Lute: camina o revienta (1987)

== Legacy ==
After the demise of the quinqui trend, some directors have looked back to the quinqui era themes in films such as Makinavaja, el último choriso (1992), Semos peligrosos (uséase Makinavaja 2) (1993), Stories from the Kronen (1995), What You Never Knew (2000), 7 Virgins (2005), My Quick Way Out (2006), The World Is Ours (2012), Criando Ratas (2016), Outlaws (2021), Caged Wings (2023), or Golpes (2025).
