= Confessions of a Congressman =

- Theatrical release poster
- Spanish: El diputado
- Directed by: Eloy de la Iglesia
- Written by: Gonzalo Goicoechea; Eloy de la Iglesia
- Starring: José Sacristán; María Luisa San José; José Luis Alonso; Enrique Vivó; Agustín González; Queta Claver
- Cinematography: Antonio Cuevas
- Edited by: Julio Peña
- Distributed by: Universal Films Española
- Release date: 20 October 1978
- Running time: 107 minutes
- Country: Spain
- Language: Spanish

Confessions of a Congressman (Spanish: El diputado) is a 1978 Spanish political thriller film co-written and directed by Eloy de la Iglesia. The film stars José Sacristán, María Luisa San José, José Luis Alonso, Enrique Vivó, Agustín González and Queta Claver.

The film is centered on a forbidden love between a politician and a teenage male prostitute hired by the secret police for blackmail. Their relationship takes an unexpected romantic turn, leading to a dangerous situation involving betrayal and potential murder. The film is a portrait of Spanish society during the so-called Transition.

== Plot ==
Madrid. Roberto Orbea is a marxist-leninist politician and closeted homosexual, as well as a member of a recently legalised party. He is married to Carmen, and he has been elected as deputy in the first democratic elections in Spain. But his enemies, the fascists, know his double life. Roberto likes men, and they hire Juanito to seduce the politician. They fall in love.

Furthermore, Orbea's homosexuality becomes a motive for extortion and the reason why the deputy cannot be appointed secretary general of the party. De la Iglesia here represents orthodox Marxism as a hostile space for the free expression of dissident sexualities, leaving the deputy with only one alternative for fulfillment and happiness: Roberto Orbea decides to come out of the closet

The film ends just as the politician is about to speak to his party colleagues and publicly acknowledge his homosexuality. At that moment, the sound of a camera's shot is heard, and the image remains motionless. The sound of the camera marks the transition of his homosexual identity from private to public life and indicates that the path to freedom was out there, neither to the left nor to the right.

== Cast ==
- José Sacristán as Roberto Orbea
- María Luisa San José as Carmen
- José Luis Alonso as Juanito
- Enrique Vivó as Morena Pastrana
- Agustín González as Carres
- Queta Claver as Juanito's chef
- Ángel Pardo as Nes
- Juan Antonio Bardem
- Mari Ángeles Acevedo
- Fernando Marin
- Aldo Grilo
- Ramón Repáraz
- Fabián Conde
- Alejo Loren
- Ramón Centenero
- María Jesús Hoyos
- Vicente Sangiovanni
- Coral Pellicer

== Release ==
The film was a box-office hit, with close to one million admissions.

== Reception ==
Film critic Paul Attanasio wrote the film "starts out nicely, with crackerjack editing and some fun surrealism, but there's no real narrative drive." He went on to say "De la Iglesia directs with a graceful, gliding camera, and he's playful with the medium, dabbling in freeze frames and still montages; but as the film gets talkier, the style gets more static; and it's hard to get a handle on the tone."

American film scholar B. Ruby Rich said the film is a "shrewdly provocative thriller; and the director fashions a very credible movie, one that summons up Costa-Gavras or Francesco Rosi in its analysis of power, while its treatment of sex has more soft-core lyricism to it; the films one problem is a classic philosophical dilemma: how to make utopian visions either credible or desirable."

André Hereford of Metro Weekly said that "José Sacristán, calling to mind a Spanish Dustin Hoffman, leads an excellent cast, including Maria Luisa San José who plays Roberto's cunning wife, Carmen, in a taut drama that dives eagerly into post-Franco politics; De la Iglesia turns the screws sharply on the threesome, as surveillance and betrayal lead to murder; the filmmaker's experience making horror films pays off in a few tense sequences and one bloody reveal that captures the vibe of '70s political thrillers."

== See also ==
- Cinema of Spain
- List of Spanish films of 1978
- List of LGBTQ-related films of 1978

== Sources ==
- Attanasio, Paul (29 March 1986). "Post-Franco Weariness In 'El Diputado,' Menage a Trois Politics". The Washington Post. Archived from the original on 6 January 2026.
- Berzosa, Alberto (9 March 2015). "Sobre la Transición y el armario: El diputado". Rinconete. ISSN 1885-5008. Archived from the original on 24 January 2025 – via Centro Virtual Cervantes.
- Hereford, André (30 August 2023). "'Hidden Pleasures' and 'Confessions of a Congressman' Reviews". Metro Weekly. Archived from the original on 21 September 2023.
- Rich, B. Ruby (1987). "El Diputado". In Ozer, Jerome S. (ed.). Film Review Annual, 1986. Englewood: Film Review Publications. ISBN 0-89198-135-7. ISSN 0737-9080. "Review originally published in The Village Voice, November 5, 1985, p. 70"
- Tahmassian, Lena (2021). "Queering Iberian Politics". In Lema-Hincapié, Andrés; Domènech, Conxita (eds.). Indiscreet Fantasies: Iberian Queer Cinema. Lewisburg, Pennsylvania: Bucknell University Press. ISBN 978-1-68448-246-7.
