= Queta Claver =

Spanish actress, singer and dancer (1929–2003)

- Born: 24 June 1929; València, Spain
- Died: 3 May 2003 (aged 73); Madrid, Spain
- Education: Conservatorio de València
- Occupation(s): actress, singer, and dancer
- Years active: 1950–2000
- Known for: vedette roles in stage revues
- Spouse: Paco Alba
- Mother: Enriqueta Delás
- Awards: Valladolid gold medal (2003); National Syndicate of Spectacle: best actress (1975), best supporting actress (1972)

Queta Claver (24 June 1929 – 3 May 2003) was a Spanish actress, singer, and dancer, known for her "vedette" roles in stage revues.

== Early life ==
Enriqueta Claver Delás was born in València, Spain in 1929 (some sources give 1932). Her mother was actress Enriqueta Delás. Claver attended the Conservatorio de València.

== Career ==
Films featuring Queta Claver included La bella Mimí (1960), El vikingo (1972), Tamaño natural (1974), Los buenos días perdidos (1975), Los placeres ocultos (1977), El sacerdote (1978), El diputado (1978), La colmena (1982), El pico (1983), Tiempo de silencio (1986), Voyage to Nowhere (1986), Colegas (1987) Montoyos y Tarantos (1989), and Beltenebros (1991).

Claver also appeared in plays and especially in revues, beginning with Un crimen vulgar (1950). She was also seen in Moreno tiene que ser, Doña Mariquita de mi corazón, ¡Cinco minutos nada menos!, A vivir del cuento, Ana María, La chacha, Rodríguez y su padre, Una jovencita de 800 años, Metidos en Harina, Tres eran tres... ¡los novios de Elena!, Un millón de dolares, ¡Ay, qué ladronas!. She specialized in "vedette" roles in the revue.

Her television roles came in such series as Suspiros de España (1974), Juanita, la Larga (1982), Goya (1982), Clase media (1987), Compuesta y sin novio (1994), Ada Madrina (1999) and Nada es para siempre (2000).

She won the Valladolid gold medal for her work in El sueño de la razón. She also won two acting prizes from the National Syndicate of Spectacle, in 1972 (best supporting actress) and 1975 (best actress).

== Personal life ==
Queta Claver married dancer Paco Alba, but they were separated at the time of her death. She died in 2003, in Madrid age 73 years, from coronary disease.
