= La criatura =

- Theatrical release poster
- Directed by: Eloy de la Iglesia
- Screenplay by: Enrique Barreiro
- Produced by: Andrés Santana
- Starring: Ana Belén; Juan Diego
- Cinematography: Raúl Artigot
- Edited by: Julio Peña
- Music by: Víctor Manuel
- Production company: Alborada P.C
- Release date: 30 November 1977
- Running time: 100 minutes
- Country: Spain
- Language: Spanish

The Creature (Spanish: La criatura) is a 1977 drama film, directed by Eloy de la Iglesia. The plot follows a respectable bourgeois housewife who chooses the love for her black German Shepherd over her relationship with her husband. La criatura is notable, like Walerian Borowczyk's La Bête (1975) and Nagisa Oshima's Max mon amour (1986), for openly involving zoophilia, then a novelty in Spanish Cinema.

Shot in 1977, the film employs bestiality as a symbol of Spain's political landscape. It makes references to the massacre of Atocha and to political right wing groups that after the death of Francisco Franco, tried to maintain the dictator's political ideals.

== Plot ==
Marcos and Cristina are a well-to-do couple who have been married for several years. Their relationship has been strained, in part because they have not been able to have children. They are overjoyed when Cristina unexpectedly gets pregnant. Months before the due date, Cristina's hopes are shattered when, stopping at a gas station, she is attacked by a black German Shepherd. The shock from the attack causes Cristina to give birth prematurely to a stillborn son. To help his wife forget the tragedy, Marcos takes Cristina to the same sea side resort where they had spent their honeymoon. Cristina recovers her strength and becomes attached to a stray dog that befriends her at the beach. The dog is also a black German Shepherd, the same breed as the one that caused her misfortune. Frightened at first, she soon begins to befriend the dog which proves to be charming, tame, and very fond of her. Against her husband's protestations, Cristina takes the dog back home to the city.

Marcos, a successful presenter of a TV variety show, is a conservative Catholic sympathetic to right wing politics. He remains faithful to his wife, dismissing the romantic advances of Vicky, the cohost of his TV program. While her husband is occupied at work, Cristina finds in her dog an outlet to the love she could not give to the child she lost. Cristina calls her dog Bruno, the name she and her husband had previously chosen for their unborn son.

Marcos buys a new country house in the mountains for himself and his wife. He is distraught by the increasing attention his wife gives to Bruno. Cristina soon prefers her dog's company to her husband's. When Marcos tries to be intimate with Cristina, Bruno gets jealous and attacks him. Following Vicky's advice, Marcos buys a female dog, a White Shepherd. His strategy seems to work as Bruno begins to spend more time with his mate. However, Cristina dislikes the new dog and is horrified when she finds the dogs mating. Shortly after, the female dog has died without explanation.

The relationship between Cristina and Bruno becomes even closer. One day Marcos arrives home finding his wife in bed with her wedding gown on the side spotting marks of Bruno's paws all over the dress implying that Cristina had had sex with the dog. Appalled, Marcos asks for advice from Father Abelardo, the family's priest, who tells him to be firm and immediately surrender the dog. The priest recommends a local teacher who lovingly takes care of Bruno. Cristina is upset of being forced to surrender Bruno, but concedes.

Marcos makes an effort to rekindle the love in his marriage and wants to try having children. However, he is distracted as he takes on a new political career in defense of his conservative views which he feels are threatened under the new democratic Spain. Cristina, who is as liberal as her husband is conservative, dislikes Marcos's political career. When Cristina refuses to have sex with Marco, he gets drunk and rapes her. Confronted by Marcos about her relationship with Bruno, Cristina compares Spanish society to a hall of distorting mirrors. "I am surrounded by monsters. All I can do is become more monstrous than they are!" Cristina is then tormented by nightmares. A phone call from Christina's doctor awakes her and is informed she is pregnant again. Resolute, Cristina packs her bags, leaves Marcos, retrieves Bruno, and goes to live happily at the mountain house with her pet.

== Cast ==
- Ana Belén as Cristina
- Juan Diego as Marcos
- Claudia Gravi as Vicky
- Bárbara Lys as the teacher
- Manuel Pereiro as father Anselmo
- Luis Ciges as Luis
- Francisco Melgares as the Doctor
