= List of Spanish films of 1979 =

A list of Spanish-produced and co-produced feature films released in Spain in 1979.

== Films ==
Title	Cast & Crew	Ref.
Los bingueros	Director: Mariano Ozores Cast: Andrés Pajares, Fernando Esteso	
Caniche	Director: Bigas Luna Cast: Àngel Jové, Consol Tura, Linda Pérez Gallardo	
Companys, procés a Catalunya	Director: Josep Maria Forn Cast: Luis Iriondo, Ovidi Montllor, Montserrat Carulla	
Heart of the Forest (El corazón del bosque)	Director: Manuel Gutiérrez Aragón Cast: Ángela Molina, Norman Briski, Luis Politti	
Mama Turns 100 (Mamá cumple 100 años)	Director: Carlos Saura Cast: Geraldine Chaplin, Amparo Muñoz, Fernando Fernán Gómez, Rafaela Aparicio	
La miel	Director: Pedro Masó Cast: José Luis López Vázquez, Jane Birkin	
La Sabina	Director: José Luis Borau Cast: Ángela Molina, Jon Finch, Carol Kane, Harriet Andersson, Simon Ward, Ovidi Montllor	
Seven Days in January (Siete días de enero)	Director: Juan Antonio Bardem Cast: Manuel Egea, Fernando Sánchez Polack, Virginia González, Madeleine Robinson, Jacques François	
Street Warriors II (Perros callejeros II: Busca y captura)	Director: José Antonio de la Loma Cast: Ángel Fernández Franco, Verónica Miriel, Raúl Ramírez	
Las verdes praderas	Director: José Luis Garci Cast: Alfredo Landa, María Casanova, Carlos Larrañaga, Ángel Picazo	
