= Ramón Reparaz =

- Born: Ramón González Repáraz; October 14, 1931; San Sebastián
- Died: December 28, 2006 (aged 75); Madrid
- Occupation: Voice actor
- Spouse: Mara Goyanes (1965-2006)
- Children: 2

Ramón Reparaz (14 October 1931 – 28 December 2006) was a Spanish voice actor.

In 1945 he began violin classes with his father, who was a professional violinist, and also played the drum alongside Sergio Mendizábal, Paula Martel and Conchita Leza, between others. In 1958 he travelled to Madrid and worked with Fernando Granada. One year later he worked as voice ator and knew Mara Goyanes, with whom got married in 1965.

Mara Goyanes died on 6 November 2006 from an illness, and he died on 28 December in Madrid from a cancer.
