= Eloy de la Iglesia =

Spanish screenwriter (1944–2006)

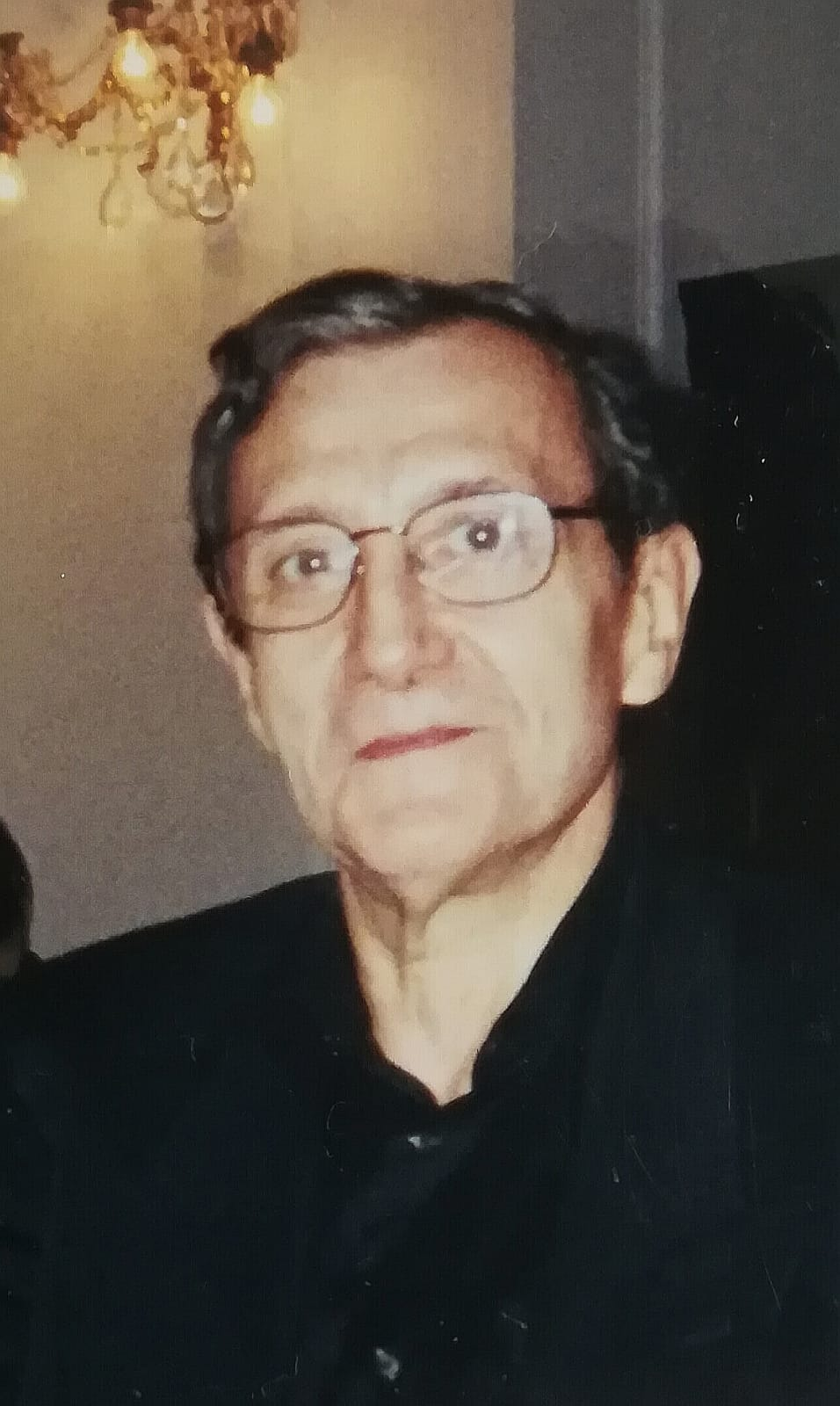
- De la Iglesia in 2001
- Born: Eloy Germán de la Iglesia Diéguez; 1 January 1944; Zarautz, Spain
- Died: 23 March 2006 (aged 62); Madrid, Spain
- Occupation: Filmmaker
- Years active: 1966–2003

Eloy de la Iglesia (1 January 1944 – 23 March 2006) was a Spanish screenwriter and film director.

De la Iglesia was an outspoken gay and socialist filmmaker who is relatively unknown outside Spain despite a prolific and successful career in his native country. He is best remembered for having portrayed urban marginality and the world of drugs and juvenile delinquency, with many of his films dealing with the theme of homosexuality. Part of his work is closely related to the phenomenon popularly known in Spain as quinqui films, to which he contributed several works. De la Iglesia took risks in his films that captured the struggles of the underclass, portraying the everyday, unidealized lives of powerless characters portrayed genuinely with flaws and vices. They are an example of commitment to the immediate reality, going against the conformist outlook of most movies of its time. Beyond their debatable aesthetic merits, his film served as a document of the Spanish marginality of the late seventies and early eighties, and they have the stamp of his strong personality.

== Early life and films ==
Born in Zarauz, Guipúzcoa into a wealthy Basque family, he grew up in Madrid. His desire to follow a career in filmmaking initially was thwarted. He attended courses at the prestigious Parisian Institut des hautes études cinématographiques, but he could not enter Spain's national film school because he wasn't yet 21, the minimum age required for admission. Instead, he began to study philosophy and literature at the Complutense University of Madrid, but he abandoned it to direct children's theater. By age 20, he had written and directed many works for television sharpening his narrative skills. He established himself as a writer of children's television programs for Radiotelevisíon Española in Barcelona.

De la Iglesia made his debut as film director when he was age 22 with Fantasia 3 (Fantasy 3, 1966), adapting three children's stories: The Maid of the Sea, The three hairs from the devil and The Wizard of Oz. While doing mandatory military service, he wrote the script of his second film, Algo Amargo en la Boca (Something Bitter Tasting, 1968).

Algo Amargo en la Boca, a sordid melodrama, and Cuadrilatero (Boxing Ring, 1969), a boxing story, faced problems with the Francoist censors and failed at the box office. His films did not attract widespread notice until his fourth effort, the critically acclaimed thriller El Techo de Cristal (The Glass Ceiling, 1970).

During the early 1970s, De la Iglesia was a member of the Spanish Communist Party; his films of this period reflected his beliefs and often centered on violent forms of social protest. His political leanings and the lurid subjects of his film made him a controversial filmmaker facing many problems with the Spanish censor under Francisco Franco's régime.

He approached the horror genre in his two following films: La semana del asesino (The Cannibal Man, 1971) and Nadie oyó gritar (No One Heard the Scream, 1972), leaving stylistic and structural academicism aside. He defined a sharp style, torn and impressionistic. His film Una gota de sangre para seguir amando (Murder in a Blue World, 1973), written with José Luis Garci, a mixed of futuristic thriller, took some cues from Stanley Kubrick's A Clockwork Orange.

== Films of the transition ==
"I talk about the world of which the majority of filmmakers do not care to speak, the marginal world. I am a most unopportunistic filmmaker. I am the one who always wants to make the films that are not supposed to be made. I’m the one interested in the subjects that everyone else has agreed not to talk about."
Eloy de la Iglesia

The dismantling of the Francoist censorship allowed De la Iglesia to increase sexually charged tones in his works. This approach became apparent in his films: Juego de amor prohibido (Games of Forbidden Love, 1975) and La otra alcoba (The Other Bedroom, 1976).

In the late 1970s, de la Iglesia, collaborated with journalist and screen riter Gonzalo Goicoechea. Los placeres ocultos (Hidden Pleasures, 1977) focused on homosexuality. El diputado (Confessions of a Congressman, 1979), follows the story of a politician who is blackmailed due to his secret homosexuality and El sacerdote (The Priest ), also released in 1979, deals with a conservative, Catholic priest whose sexual obsessions lead him to self-mutilation.

With the arrival of the 1980s, De la Iglesia explored the theme of urban insecurity in his film Miedo a salir de noche (Fear to Go Out at Night, 1980) and he mixed sex, politics and violence in La mujer del ministro (The Minister's wife, 1981).

De la Iglesia's subsequent films, written in collaboration with Gonzalo Goicoechea, were centered in social problems such as juvenile delinquency and drug addiction, such as Navajeros (Knifers, 1980), Colegas (Pals, 1982), El pico (The Needle, 1983) and El pico 2 (The Needle 2, 1984). These films made an effort to connect with a popular audience in a direct and unpretentious style. His formula for success involved young non-professional actors, topical themes, a modest budget, and usually on location shooting. From the last years of the 1970s to the early 1980s, De la Iglesia was one of Spain's more commercial successful film directors, but film critics were usually harsh in the appreciation of his work. El pico became the director's biggest success at the box office.

After the critical and commercial failure of Otra vuelta de tuerca (The Turn of the Screw, 1985), loosely based on Henry James's novel, De la Iglesia returned to the subject of juvenile delinquency in La Estanquera de vallecas (The Tobacconist from Vallecas, 1987), this time employing a humorous tone. La Estanquera de vallecas, based on a play by José Luis Alonso de Santos, continued De la Iglesia's commercial success, but it was not well received by Spanish critics.

== Last years ==
Like many of the young protagonists of his films, De la Iglesia became addicted to drugs such as heroin, and he stopped making films for 15 years. Claiming that his addiction to cinema was stronger than his drug problems, De la Iglesia eventually kicked his habit and resumed his career making Los novios bulgaros (The Bulgarian Lovers, 2003), a film based on the novel of the same title written by Eduardo Mendicutti.

Stricken with kidney cancer, he died on 23 March 2006, age 62, after surgery to remove a malignant tumor. He was cremated at Cementerio de la Almudena.

== Filmography as director ==
Year	English title	Original title	Notes
1966	Fantasy 3	Fantasía 3	Made of three episodes: The Maid of the Sea, The Three Hairs from the Devil and The Wizard of Oz
1969	Something Bitter Tasting	Algo amargo en la boca	
1970	Boxing Ring	Cuadrilátero	
1971	The Glass Ceiling	El techo de cristal	
1972	The Cannibal Man	La semana del asesino	
1973	No One Heard the Scream	Nadie oyó gritar	
1973	Murder in a Blue World	Una gota de sangre para morir amando	
1975	Game of Forbidden Love	Juego de amor prohibido	
1976	The Other Bedroom	La otra alcoba	
1977	The Creature	La criatura	Original Script
1977	Hidden Pleasures	Los placeres ocultos	
1979	Confessions of a Congressman	El diputado	
1979	The Priest	El Sacerdote	
1980	Fear to go out at Night	Miedo a salir de noche	
1981	The Minister’s Wife	La mujer del ministro	
1981	Knifers	Navajeros	
1982	Pals	Colegas	
1983	The Needle	El pico	
1984	The Needle 2	El pico 2	
1985	The Turn of the Screw	Otra vuelta de tuerca	based on Henry James's novel The Turn of the Screw
1987	Hostages in the Barrio	La estanquera de Vallecas	based on a play by José Luis Alonso de Santos
2003	Bulgarian Lovers	Los novios búlgaros	based on a novel by Eduardo Mendicutti
