= List of Spanish films of 1976 =

A list of Spanish-produced and co-produced feature films released in Spain in 1976.

== Films ==
Title	Cast & Crew	Ref.
La trastienda	Director: Jorge Grau Cast: María José Cantudo, Frederick Stafford, Rosanna Schiaffino	
Raise Ravens (Cría cuervos)	Director: Carlos Saura Cast: Geraldine Chaplin, Ana Torrent, Mónica Randall	
The Legion Like Women (A la legión le gustan las mujeres... y a las mujeres, les gusta la legión)	Director: Rafael Gil Cast: Luis Varela, Manuel Codeso, Francisco Cecilio, Venancio Muro	
Who Can Kill a Child? (¿Quién puede matar a un niño?)	Director: Narciso Ibáñez Serrador Cast: Lewis Fiander, Prunella Ransome	
Pascual Duarte	Director: Ricardo Franco Cast: José Luis Gómez, Héctor Alterio, Eduardo Calvo, Joaquín Hinojosa	
La otra alcoba	Director: Eloy de la Iglesia Cast: Amparo Muñoz, Patxi Andión, Simón Andreu	
Ambitious (Ambiciosa)	Director: Pedro Lazaga Cast: Teresa Rabal, José Bódalo, Manuel Zarzo	
Volvoreta	Director: José Antonio Nieves Conde Cast: Amparo Muñoz, Ramiro Oliveros, Mónica Randall, Antonio Mayans	
Las delicias de los verdes años	Director: Antonio Mercero Cast: María José Cantudo, Francisco Algora, Bárbara Rey, María Salerno, Beatriz Escudero	
El desencanto	Director: Jaime Chávarri Cast: Felicidad Blanc, Leopoldo María Panero, Juan Luis Panero, Michi Panero	
Family Portrait (Retrato de familia)	Director: Antonio Giménez-Rico Cast: Antonio Ferrandis, Amparo Soler Leal, Miguel Bosé, Mónica Randall	
Libertad provisional	Director: Roberto Bodegas Cast: Patxi Andión, Concha Velasco	
The Request (La petición)	Director: Pilar Miró Cast: Ana Belén, Emilio Gutiérrez Caba, Frédéric de Pasquale, María Luisa Ponte, Mayrata O'Wisiedo, Félix Rotaeta, Carmen Maura	
El secreto inconfesable de un chico bien	Director: Jorge Grau Cast: María José Cantudo, José Sacristán	
Long Vacations of 36 (Las largas vacaciones del 36)	Director: Jaime Camino Cast: Analía Gadé, Ismael Merlo, Ángela Molina, Vicente Parra, Francisco Rabal, José Sacristán, Charo Soriano, Concha Velasco, José Vivó	
La espada negra	Director: Francisco Rovira Beleta Cast: Maribel Martín, Juan Ribó, José María Rodero, José Bódalo	
Beatriz	Director: Gonzalo Suárez Cast: Sandra Mozarowsky, Carmen Sevilla, Nadiuska, José Sacristán, Jorge Rivero	
The Anchorite (El anacoreta)	Director: Juan Estelrich Cast: Fernando Fernán Gómez, Charo Soriano, Martine Audo, José María Mompín, Claude Dauphin, Isabel Mestres	
El alijo	Director: Ángel del Pozo Cast: Juan Luis Galiardo, Fernando Sancho, Helga Liné, Manolo Zarzo	
Manuela	Director: Gonzalo García-Pelayo Cast: Charo López, Fernando Rey	
La Corea	Director: Pedro Olea Cast: Queta Claver, Ángel Pardo, Cristina Galbó, Gonzalo Castro	
