= Amparo Muñoz =

Spanish actress and model, Miss Universe 1974 winner

Amparo Muñoz y Quesada
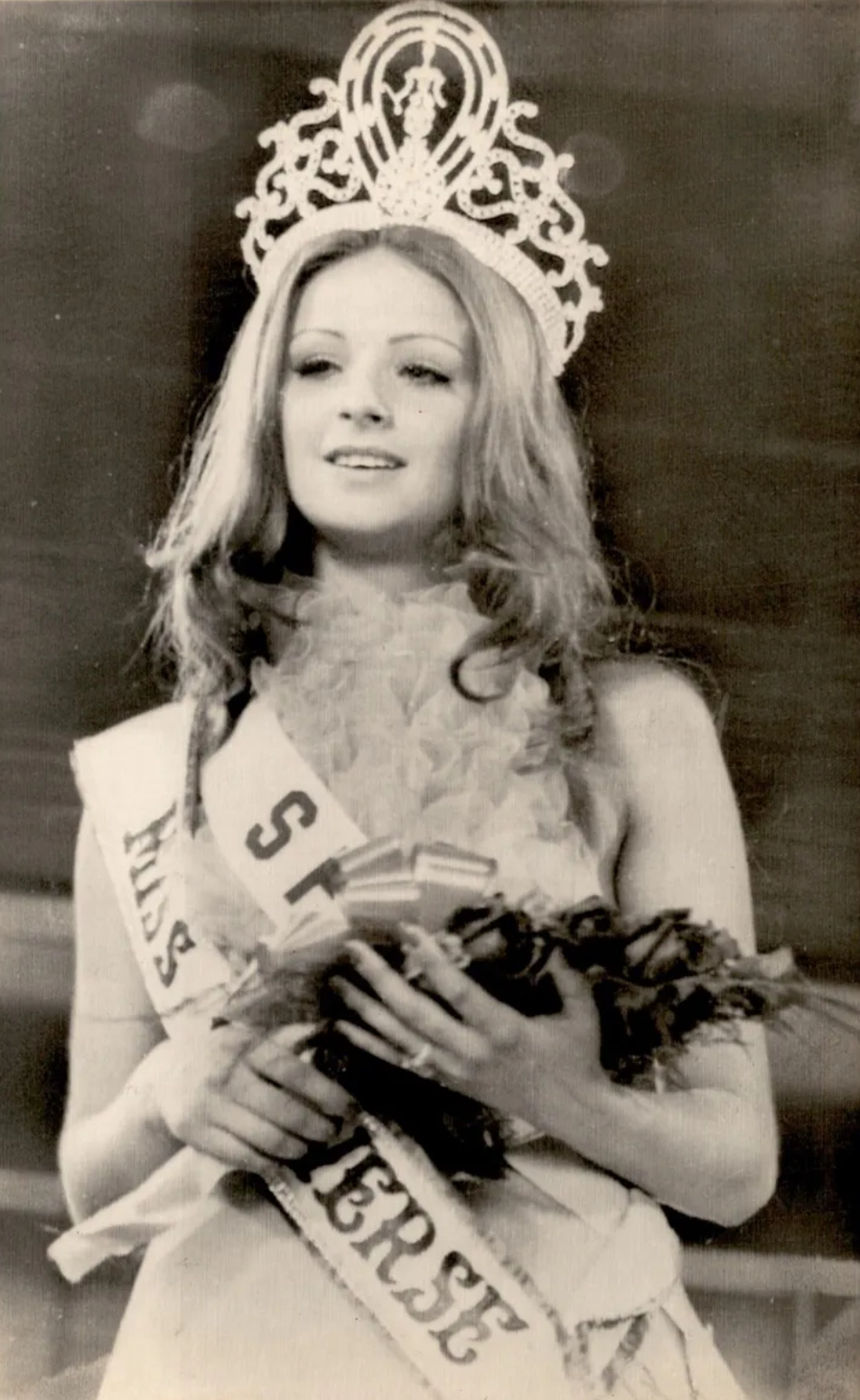
- Muñoz as the 23rd Miss Universe
- Born: Maria de Amparo Muñoz Quesada; 21 June 1954; Vélez-Málaga (Málaga), Spain
- Died: 27 February 2011 (aged 56); Málaga, Spain
- Occupations: Beauty queen Actress
- Spouse: Francisco Andion Gonzalez (m. 1976; div. 1983)
- Beauty pageant titleholder
- Title: Miss Spain 1973; Miss Universe 1974 (Resigned) †
- Hair color: Light brown
- Eye color: Green

Maria de Amparo Muñoz y Quesada (21 June 1954 – 27 February 2011) was a Spanish actress, model and beauty queen who won the Miss Universe 1974 competition in Manila, Philippines, being the first and only Spaniard Miss Universe titleholder to date.

Muñoz surrendered both the title and crown after six months due to refusal to follow the rules and regulations of the Miss Universe Organization. During that time, no successor was willing nor assigned to officially take her vacated placement.

After her shortened reign, Muñoz became a popular actress in Spain and starred in several comedies, including Mama Turns 100, and in the dramas Clara es el Precio, The Other Bedroom and Dedicatory. Her personal life was often shrouded in notorious events and public controversies. She died on 27 February 2011 due to cerebral aneurysm complications and was cremated and buried at the Roman Catholic cemetery of Saint Michael in Málaga, Spain.

== Early life ==
Maria de Amparo Muñoz was born on 21 June 1954 in Vélez-Málaga, to a blacksmith father and a housewife. Born in the Marian year of 1954, she was named after the Blessed Virgin Mary under the title of “Our Lady of the Abandoned” (Spanish: Nuestra Señora de los Desamparados) the firstborn child among six children. Her godparents helped raise her at age seven due to their family's poverty.

After finishing high school, she worked as an administrative office assistant for "The Southern" local newspaper in Málaga. The gay male director of the newspaper agency strongly encouraged Muñoz to enter the beauty contest, "El Certamen de Belleza de Costa del Sol" (English: Miss Sun Coast Beauty Contest) which gained her an entry sash to participate and won in the Miss Spain 1973 contest in Lanzarote city.

== Miss Universe ==
Amparo Muñoz came from the town of Vélez-Málaga (Málaga) in Andalusia, where she had won the city title, to compete at the Miss Spain contest held in Lanzarote. After winning, she went on to win the Miss Universe 1974 pageant in the Philippines.

According to her Filipina translator, Maria del Pilar Abesraturi Aldanese, she was homesick for her family and existing lover in Spain at the time. By the six month after winning, she declined to participate in the New York Parade with American actors Robert de Niro and Al Pacino. Remaining in Malaga, she chose to stay with personal friends and later gave up her crown after she refused her upcoming travel assignment to Tokyo, Japan, at times even throwing her crown against a wall and down in the balcony window, which often required jewel repair.

Nevertheless, the Miss Universe Organization in an effort to save its public reputation of the company thoroughly insisted that Muñoz would remain as the official titleholder of Miss Universe 1974, since the title was not offered to first runner-up Miss Wales Helen Elizabeth Morgan – who eventually won Miss World 1974 and was herself ultimately dethroned a few days after winning the said crown. Due to the refusal of Muñoz to pass the coronation of her successor, the 21st Miss Universe was assigned to pass on the Miss Universe crown in 1975.

== Cinema ==
After her victory in pageantry, various cinematic directors took interest in her. Her first steps in cinema came in 1973 with in Wholesome Married Life, directed by Roberto Bodegas and written by José Luis Garci, she played the temptress of José Sacristán, a married man obsessed with publicity. In Tocata y fuga de Lolita she was the rebellious girl who displayed her beautiful bust, a big contributor to the movie's popularity. In the 70's, Spanish cinema was at the height of destape [double meaning: "liberalization" and "nudity"], and the splendid figure of Amparo Muñoz found 9 titles in which to reveal itself, including Clara es el Precio (Vicente Aranda, 1975), and The Other Bedroom (Eloy de la Iglesia, 1976), in which Amparo starred alongside the man who would be eventually her husband, the actor and singer Patxi Andión.

After appearances in Volvoreta (José Antonio Nieves Conde, 1976), Del Amor y de la Muerte (Antonio Giménez Rico, 1977), among other films, her cinematic career took a notable turn when she began a relationship with the producer Elías Querejeta, facilitating her appearances in films as important as Dedicatory (Jaime Chávarri, 1980), which called her to the attention of other directors in both Spain and Mexico, such as Felipe Cazals (Las siete cucas ), Pilar Miró (We Will Speak Tonight), Jaime Camino (The Open Balcony), Emilio Martínez Lázaro (Lulú of the Night), Imanol Uribe (The Black Moon). She became an instant celebrity in Spain, alongside the likes of Nino Bravo, Pedro Carrasco, Rocío Dúrcal, Rocío Jurado, Camilo Sesto, La Pandilla and other Spanish celebrities of the 1970s, following her victory at Miss Universe with a fruitful show business career.

In 1979, Muñoz acted in the comedy Mama Turns 100, by Carlos Saura. This was followed by performances in 1982's Todo un Hombre (He's all a Man), 1999's A Paradise Under the Stars and 2003's El Tahur. In 1980, she went to live in Mexico and partnered with Chilean national Flavio Labarca, who ran an antique shop.

In 1983, she co—starred with the 18th Miss Universe in a Philippine film "Hayop sa Ganda" (English: Savagely Beautiful), but animosity developed due to her poor temperament and tardiness on camera set while opposing the film producers including her own talent manager, Natalie Palanca whom she physically slapped in public. For this offense, Munoz was legally sued by Palanca in the Philippine court (Trial in absentia) and was later ruled guilty of verdict by the Metropolitan Trial Court of Manila.

In 1989, she returned to mainstream Spanish cinema with the movie Familia, by Fernando León de Aranoa and started a new life as an actress. In 1991, she lived with Victor Guijarro in the Philippines, thereby disappearing from film for seven years (1989—1996), but eventually her immediate family requested her return to Spain, during which began the alleged melancholia and extreme mental depression of Muñoz. Accordingly, though raised and baptized Roman Catholic, Muñoz later dabbled and experimented with various New Age philosophies, including "Mikyo Dorje Karmapa" in Tibetan Buddhism, Indonesian—Balinese Hinduism and Soka Gakkai practices during the early 1990s.

Returning to Spain in 1996, growing tabloid newspaper accusations of prostitution, mental depression, heroin drug addiction, Parkinson's disease, and HIV coupled with poverty and melancholia ravaged Muñoz' public image, along with the physical decrepitude, allegedly causing emotional shame and her imminent withdrawal from society.

== Personal life ==
In 1976, Muñoz met singer Francisco Andion Gonzalez, who would become her husband, while making The Other Bedroom. Accordingly, she claimed mistreatment from Andion and later had a miscarriage of pregnancy. They were married on 16 May 1976 and divorced in 1978. However, due to the irregularities of this marriage according to the Constitution of Spain, it was delayed in the courts and not legally finalized until 1983.

Afterwards, Muñoz had brief romantic relationships with Antonio Flores, Vicente Fernández and Máximo Valverde. She also had a romantic relationship with José Coronado and an "unnamed politician" which was never revealed to the public. Later on, she dated both Flavio Labarca when she lived in Mexico in 1980 and Víctor Rubio Guijarro in the Philippines in 1991, both who suffered from drug abuse by which Muñoz called off in both relationships. She remained in the Philippines until 1996 due to the LGBT community which cherished her as a beauty queen despite her family’s request to repatriate in Spain.

The most significant extramarital relationship of Muñoz's life was with Spaniard film producer Elías Querejeta. She met Querejeta on the set of Mamá cumple cien años in 1978, which was nominated for the Academy Award for Best Foreign Language Film at the 52nd Academy Awards. The relationship subsequently received much publicity.

At the earlier stage of their relationship, Munoz requested a divorce from Querejeta, who refused to divorce for the sake of public embarrassment (as coming from a devout Roman Catholic family) with his only daughter, Gracia Querejeta. He remained legally married to his wife, Maria del Carmen Marin, a film costume designer, throughout their relationship—although he and his legal wife had been living separate lives, there was never an official split and neither party pursued a divorce. Accordingly, after their reunion as a couple in 1996, Muñoz as a mistress, no longer interfered to break this union, and also never fought for neither marital nor conjugal rights.

== Death ==
Muñoz had been long struggling with health issues. In 1975, she was medically diagnosed with depression. In the spring of 1991, she suffered from acute pancreatitis. In 2003, she was formally diagnosed with a brain tumor along with an arterial malformation in the vicinity of her Cerebellum.

Muñoz was duly advised by her physicians of imminent death in which she suffered two more cerebral aneurysms, the first case which paralyzed half of her body, the latter which partially impaired her vision. She became reclusive and refused to physically meet with anyone, except a very select few individuals and only allowed communication via telephone.

She died on 27 February 2011 (aged 56) in Málaga, and was given a highly private Catholic funeral at her own personal request. Her mortal remains were cremated on 1 March 2011 and her gravestone is marked at the Roman Catholic cemetery of Saint Michael in Málaga, Spain.

== Filmography ==
=== Film ===
Year	Title of Film	Role	Notes
1974	Vida conyugal sana	modelo publicitaria	
1974	Tocata y fuga de Lolita	Lolita Villar	
1975	Sensualidad	Ana	
1975	Clara es el precio	Clara Valverde	
1976	La otra alcoba	Diana	
1976	Mauricio, mon amour	Doctora Verónica Anglada	
1976	Volvoreta	Volvoreta	
1977	Del amor y de la muerte	Elena	
1977	Acto de posesión	Berta	
1979	El anillo matrimonial	Alba	
1979	Mamá cumple cien años	Natalia	Brussels Film Festival Award for Best Supporting Actress; Nominated—Academy Award for Best Foreign Language Film; Jury Prize for Best Cinematography San Sebastián International Film Festival
1979	El tahúr	Alejandra	
1980	Memorias de un visitador médico	Magdalena	
1980	Dedicatory	Clara	Nominated— Palme d'Or en el Festival de Cannes
1981	El Gran Triunfo	Rosita Montes	
1981	La mujer del ministro	Teresa	
1981	Como México no hay dos	Silvia Escandón	
1981	Las siete cucas	Cresencia	
1981	Trágala, perro	Sor Patrocinio	
1982	Si las mujeres mandaran (o mandasen)	Agustina	
1982	Hablamos esta noche	Clara	
1982	El gran mogollón	María Ángeles	
1982	El diablo en persona	Lupita	
1983	Todo un hombre	Laura Monteros	
1983	Hayop sa ganda		
1983	Se me sale cuando me río		
1984	El balcón abierto	La Mujer	
1985	La reina del mate	Cristina	
1986	Lulú de noche	Nina	
1986	Delirios de amor	Angélica Durán	
1987	Las dos orillas		
1987	Los invitados	La catalana	
1987	En penumbra	Helena	
1988	La luna negra	Lilit	Premiere San Sebastián International Film Festival; Best Cinematography Sitges Film Festival and Fantasporto Film Festival
1989	Al acecho		
1996	Familia	Carmen	Premiere Vancouver International Film Festival; Best Cinematography Festival Internacional de Cine de Mar del Plata
1996	Licántropo	Dra. Mina Westenra	
1997	Fotos	Rosa	Mejor película en Sitges Film Festival; Nominated - Brussels International Fantastic Film Festival
1997	Elles	Maria	Premiere Palm Springs International Film Festival
1999	Tierra de cañones	La Cantero	
2000	Un paraíso bajo las estrellas	Olivia	Premiere Sundance Film Festival

=== Television ===
Year	Title	Role
1968	Hora once	
1976	Las aventuras del Hada Rebeca	
1982	Sonata de estío	Niña Chole
1983	Las pícaras	
1983	Sonatas	Niña Chole
1987	Vida privada	Concha Pujol
1989	Brigada Central	Marisa
1993	Los cuentos de Borges	Gracia
2011	El Caso de la Novia Dividida	La Señora Hardisson

=== Stage ===
Year	Title	Role	Notes
2000	La habitación del hotel	Shelly	

Awards and achievements
Preceded by (Philippines) Margie Moran	Miss Universe; 1974 (Resigned) †	Succeeded by (Finland) Anne Marie Pohtamo
Preceded by María del Rocío Martín	Miss Spain; 1973	Succeeded by Chelo Martin
