= Mama Turns 100 =

Mamá cumple 100 años
- Theatrical release poster
- Directed by: Carlos Saura
- Written by: Carlos Saura; Rafael Azcona
- Produced by: Elías Querejeta
- Starring: Geraldine Chaplin; Fernando Fernán Gómez; Rafaela Aparicio; Amparo Muñoz
- Cinematography: Luis Cuadrado
- Edited by: Pablo González del Amo
- Music by: Luis de Pablo
- Release date: 17 September 1979
- Running time: 100 minutes
- Country: Spain
- Language: Spanish

Mama Turns 100 (Spanish: Mamá cumple cien años) is a 1979 Spanish comedy film co-written and directed by Carlos Saura. The film is a comedy sequel of the drama Ana and the Wolves directed by Saura in 1973. It was nominated for the Academy Award for Best Foreign Language Film at the 52nd Academy Awards.

== Plot ==
In celebration of Mama's 100th birthday, a Spanish extended family gathers at their ancestral country estate. Among the attendees is Ana, married to Antonio, who once worked as a nanny here many years ago. Beneath the veneer of cordiality and politeness, bitter realities simmer, as significant changes have occurred within the family: José died three years prior, Juan has parted ways with his wife Luchi, and only Fernando, an enthusiast of kite-flying, remains with his elderly mother. The young girls Ana once cared for have long since transitioned out of childhood.

As an observer, Ana discerns that this family has disintegrated into its individual fragments, with the forsaken Luchi having misappropriated the funds of the plump and scarcely mobile matriarch. Upon the arrival of her ex-husband Juan for the celebratory occasion, the deepest fissures among the family members are laid bare: Together with Fernando and Luchi, Juan plots nothing short of the matriarch's demise to gain access to her inheritance. And Ana, the onlooker and former governess, will soon find herself among the mourners, as her husband Antonio embarks on a dalliance with Natalia, another member of the family.

== Cast ==
- Geraldine Chaplin as Ana
- Amparo Muñoz as Natalia
- Fernando Fernán Gómez as Fernando
- Norman Briski as Antonio
- Rafaela Aparicio as Mamá
- Charo Soriano as Luchi
- José Vivó as Juan
- Ángeles Torres as Carlota
- Elisa Nandi as Victoria
- Rita Maiden as Solange
- Monique Ciron as Anny
- José María Prada as José (uncredited)

== Production ==
Filmed in 1978 in Torrelodonos, the movie premiered on September 17, 1979, at the San Sebastián Film Festival.

== Reception ==
=== Critical response ===
Carlos Aguilar remarked that this film revisits the character dynamics of Ana and the Wolves, albeit with a chosen "tragicomic perspective."

According to Lexikon des internationalen Films: "Saura reflects the ongoing process of change in Spain's state and society in a manner reminiscent of a continuation of his film Ana and the Wolves. Although imbued with satire, it portrays a relaxed, almost affectionate attachment to its subject. Despite the usual symbolism, it remains a relatively accessible film by the Spanish director."

=== Accolades ===
The film garnered significant attention both domestically and internationally. In addition to an Oscar nomination for Best Foreign Language Film, Mama Turns 100 secured the CEC Award from the Spanish Authors Association Círculo de Escritores Cinematográficos, the Sant Jordi Film Award for lead actress Rafaela Aparicio, and a Special Jury Prize for director Saura at the San Sebastián Film Festival.

== See also ==
- List of submissions to the 52nd Academy Awards for Best Foreign Language Film
- List of Spanish submissions for the Academy Award for Best Foreign Language Film
