= Manuela (1976 film) =

- Directed by: Gonzalo García Pelayo
- Screenplay by: Pancho Bautista
- Based on: Manuela by Manuel Halcón
- Starring: Charo López; Fernando Rey; Máximo Valverde; Carmen Platero; Mario Pardo; Fernando Sánchez Polack
- Cinematography: Raúl Artigot
- Edited by: Roberto Fandiño
- Release date: 7 June 1976
- Running time: 105 minutes
- Country: Spain
- Language: Spanish

Manuela is a 1976 Spain rural drama film directed by Gonzalo García Pelayo based on the novel of the same name by Manuel Halcón. It stars Charo López along with Fernando Rey, Máximo Valverde, Carmen Platero, Mario Pardo, and Fernando Sánchez Polack.

== Plot ==
Based on the novel Manuela by Manuel Halcón, the plot consists of a rural drama set in a cortijo in the Lower Andalusia, exploring the twilight of the Andalusian landowner figure. It is set in the early 1950s and late 1960s.

== Cast ==
- Charo Lopez as adult Manuela
- Fernando Rey as don Ramón
- Máximo Valverde as Antonio
- Carmen Platero as Purita
- Mario Pardo as Antoñillo
- Fernando Sánchez Polack as El Moreno

== Production ==
It features music by Lole y Manuel and Triana.

== Release ==
The film was released theatrically in Madrid on 7 June 1976.

== See also ==
- List of Spanish films of 1976

== Bibliography ==
- Galdón Sánchez, Miguel Ángel (2026). "Manuela. La primera película del cine andaluz" (PDF). Documentos Destacados AGAn (13). Consejería de Cultura y Deporte. Junta de Andalucía. ISSN 3020-3872.
