= 1976 Cannes Film Festival =

- Official poster of the 29th Cannes Film Festival, an original illustration by Polish painter Wojciech Siudmak.
- Opening film: That's Entertainment, Part II
- Closing film: Family Plot
- Location: Cannes, France
- Founded: 1946
- Awards: Palme d'Or: Taxi Driver
- No. of films: 20 (In Competition)
- Festival date: 13 May 1976 – 28 May 1976
- Website: festival-cannes.com/en

Cannes Film Festival
- 1977 1975

The 29th Cannes Film Festival took place from 13 to 28 May 1976. American author Tennessee Williams served as jury president for the main competition.

American filmmaker Martin Scorsese won the Palme d'Or, the festival's top prize, for the drama film Taxi Driver.

A new non-competitive section, L'Air du temps, focused on contemporary subjects was introduced. This section, along with sections Les Yeux fertiles of the previous edition were later integrated into Un Certain Regard section in 1978.

The festival opened with That's Entertainment, Part II by Gene Kelly, and closed with Family Plot by Alfred Hitchcock.

== Juries ==
=== Main Competition ===
- Tennessee Williams, American author - Jury President
- Jean Carzou, French painter
- Costa-Gavras, Greek-French filmmaker
- Mario Cecchi Gori, Italian producer
- András Kovács, Hungarian filmmaker
- Mario Vargas Llosa, Peruvian author
- Charlotte Rampling, British actress
- Lorenzo López Sancho, Spanish journalist
- Georges Schéhadé, Lebanese author

== Official selection ==
=== In Competition ===
The following feature films competed for the Palme d'Or:

English title	Original title	Director(s)	Production country
Babatu		Jean Rouch	Niger
Bugsy Malone		Alan Parker	United States
A Child in the Crowd	Un enfant dans la foule	Gérard Blain	France
The Claw and the Tooth	La griffe et la dent	François Bel	France
Cría Cuervos		Carlos Saura	Spain
Down and Dirty	Brutti, sporchi e cattivi	Ettore Scola	Italy
The Inheritance	L'eredità Ferramonti	Mauro Bolognini	Italy
Kings of the Road	Im Lauf der Zeit	Wim Wenders	West Germany
Letters from Marusia	Actas de Marusia	Miguel Littin	Mexico
The Marquise of O	Die Marquise von O...	Éric Rohmer	West Germany, France
Monsieur Klein		Joseph Losey	France, Italy
Mrs. Dery Where Are You?	Déryné hol van?	Gyula Maár	Hungary
Next Stop, Greenwich Village		Paul Mazursky	United States
Nishant		Shyam Benegal	India
Pascual Duarte		Ricardo Franco	Spain
Private Vices, Public Pleasures	Vizi privati, pubbliche virtù	Miklós Jancsó	Italy, Yugoslavia
Shadow of Angels	Schatten der Engel	Daniel Schmid	Switzerland
Sweet Revenge		Jerry Schatzberg	United States
Taxi Driver		Martin Scorsese	United States
The Tenant	Le Locataire	Roman Polanski	France

=== Out of Competition ===
The following films were selected to be screened out of competition:

- 1900 (Novecento) by Bernardo Bertolucci
- Anna by Alberto Grifi, Massimo Sarchielli
- Ascension by Olivier Dassault
- Bobby by Marty Ollstein
- The California Reich by Walter F. Parkes, Keith F. Critchlow
- Confidences of the Night (L'amour blessé) by Jean Pierre Lefebvre
- A Delicate Balance by Tony Richardson
- Edvard Munch by Peter Watkins
- Les enfants des autres by Martin Pierlot
- Face to Face by Ingmar Bergman
- Family Plot by Alfred Hitchcock
- Grey Gardens by David Maysles, Albert Maysles, Ellen Hovde, Muffie Meyer
- Hedda by Trevor Nunn
- Hollywood... Hollywood! by Gene Kelly
- The Iceman Cometh by John Frankenheimer
- Illustrious Corpses (Cadaveri eccelenti) by Francesco Rosi
- Labirintus by András Kovács
- The Memory of Justice by Marcel Ophüls
- Notes Towards an African Orestes (Appunti per un'Orestiade Africana) by Pier Paolo Pasolini
- Orlando furioso by Luca Ronconi
- La Pharmacie-Shangaï by Joris Ivens, Marceline Loridan
- Le pont de singe by André Harris, Alain De Sedouy
- Sartre par lui-même by Alexandre Astruc, Michel Contat
- Summerfolk by Peter Stein
- Train Landscape by Jules Engel

=== Short Films Competition ===
The following short films competed for the Short Film Palme d'Or:

- Agulana by Gérald Frydman
- Babfilm by Ottó Foky
- Hidalgo by Ion Truica
- High Fidelity by Antoinette Starkiewicz
- Metamorphosis by Barry Greenwald
- Nightlife by Robin Lehman
- Perfo by Jean Paul Cambron
- Rodin mis en vie by Alfred Brandler
- La Rosette arrosée by Paul Doppf
- La Syncope by Edouard Niermans

== Parallel sections ==
=== International Critics' Week ===
The following feature films were screened for the 15th International Critics' Week (15e Semaine de la Critique):

- Before the Time Comes (Le Temps de l’avant) by Anne Claire Poirier (Canada)
- Une Fille unique by Philippe Nahou (France)
- Der Gehulfe by Thomas Koerfer (Switzerland)
- Harvest: 3,000 Years by Haile Gerima (Ethiopia)
- Iracema: Uma Transa Amazônica by Jorge Bodansky, Orlando Senna (Brazil, West Germany, France)
- Mélodrame by Jean-Louis Jorge (France)
- Tracks by Henry Jaglom (USA)

=== Directors' Fortnight ===
The following films were screened for the 1976 Directors' Fortnight (Quinzaine des Réalizateurs):

- Anno Domini 1573 (Seljačka buna 1573) by Vatroslav Mimica (Yugoslavia)
- The Battle of Chile (La Batalla de Chile: El golpe de estado) by Patricio Guzman (Chile, Cuba)
- Behindert by Stephen Dwoskin (West Germany, United Kingdom)
- Le berceau de cristal by Philippe Garrel (France)
- O Casamento by Arnaldo Jabor (Brazil)
- The Devil's Playground by Fred Schepisi (Australia)
- Le diable au cœur by Bernard Queysanne (France)
- Duelle by Jacques Rivette (France)
- Four Days to Death (Cetiri dana do smrti) by Miroslav Jokić (Yugoslavia)
- Giliap by Roy Andersson (Sweden)
- Gitirana (doc.) by Jorge Bodansky, Orlando Senna (Brazil)
- Goldflocken by Werner Schroeter (West Germany, France)
- Hollywood on Trial (doc.) by David Helpern Jr. (United States)
- In the Realm of the Senses (L'Empire des sens) by Nagisa Oshima (France, Japan)
- Les Nomades by Sid Ali Mazif (Algeria)
- Os Demónios de Alcácer Quibir by José Fonseca e Costa (Portugal)
- A Pacemaker and a Sidecar (L'Eau chaude, l'eau frette) by André Forcier (Canada)
- Son nom de Venise dans Calcutta désert by Marguerite Duras (France)
- Strongman Ferdinand by Alexander Kluge (West Germany)
- Normande (La tête de Normande St-Onge) by Gilles Carle (Canada)
- We Have Many Names (We har manje namn) (doc.) by Mai Zetterling (Sweden)

Short films

- L'enfant prisonnier by Jean-Michel Carré (France)
- The Labyrinth Tale (Meikyū-tan) by Shuji Terayama (Japan)
- Leonina by Jean-Paul Courraud (France)
- Les Stars by Serge Lutens (France)
- Pierre Molinier - 7 Rue Des Faussets by Noël Simsolo (France, Luxembourg)
- Walter by Serge Dubor (France)

== Official Awards ==
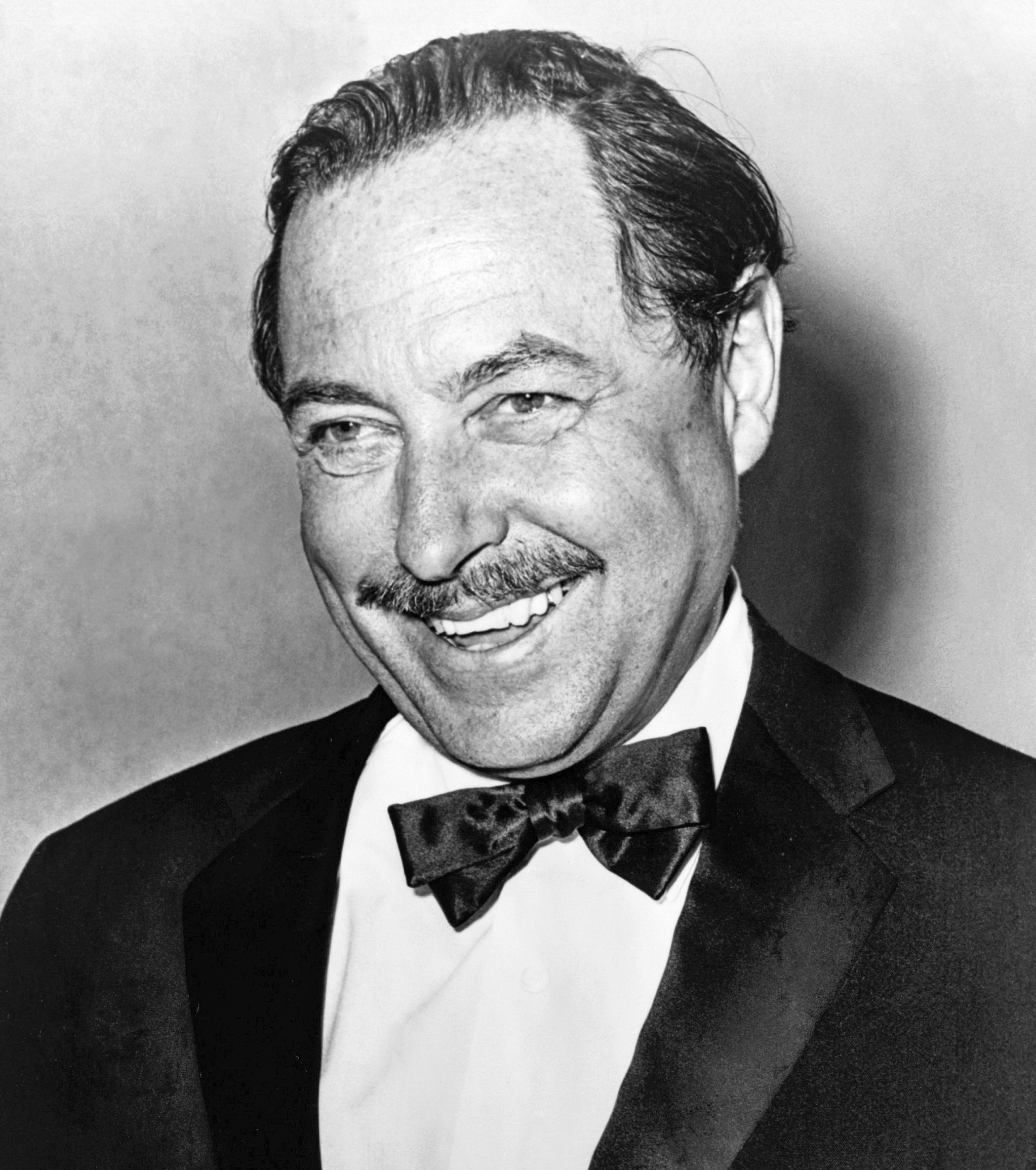
Tennessee Williams, Jury President

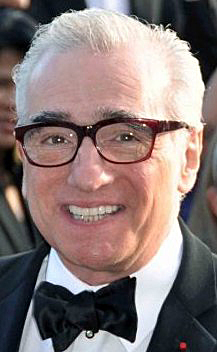
Martin Scorsese, Palme d'Or winner

=== In Competition ===
- Palme d'Or: Taxi Driver by Martin Scorsese
- Grand Prix:
  - Cría Cuervos by Carlos Saura
  - The Marquise of O by Éric Rohmer
- Best Director: Ettore Scola for Down and Dirty
- Best Actress:
  - Dominique Sanda for The Inheritance
  - Mari Törőcsik for Mrs. Dery Where Are You?
- Best Actor: José Luis Gómez for Pascual Duarte

=== Short Film Palme d'Or ===
- Metamorphosis by Barry Greenwald
- Jury Prize:
  - Agulana by Gérald Frydman
  - Nightlife by Robin Lehman

== Independent Awards ==
=== FIPRESCI Prize ===
- Kings of the Road by Wim Wenders (Unanimously) (In competition)
- Strongman Ferdinand by Alexander Kluge

=== Commission Supérieure Technique ===
- Technical Grand Prize: Michel Fano (sound) for The Claw and the Tooth

== Media ==
- INA: Opening of the 1976 festival (commentary in French)
- INA: The wonders of the music hall at Cannes (commentary in French)
