= La otra alcoba =

- Theatrical release poster
- Directed by: Eloy de la Iglesia
- Screenplay by: Eloy de la Iglesia; Rafael Sánchez Campoy
- Story by: Rafael Sánchez Campoy
- Produced by: Oscar Guarido
- Starring: Patxi Andión; Amparo Muñoz; Simón Andreu
- Cinematography: Carlos Suárez
- Edited by: José Luis Matesanz
- Music by: Patxi Andión
- Production companies: Alborada, P.C
- Release date: 3 May 1976
- Running time: 88 minutes
- Country: Spain
- Language: Spanish

La otra alcoba ('The other bedroom') is a 1976 Spanish film written and directed by Eloy de la Iglesia. It stars Patxi Andión, Amparo Muñoz and Simón Andreu. The plot follows the beautiful wife of a prosperous business man who starts an affair with a man of a humble background in order to have the child that she cannot have with her sterile husband. The film was shot in Madrid and Navacerrada.

== Plot ==
Marcos, an important businessman working in Madrid, is wealthy, ambitious and has political aspirations. On top of it, he has a beautiful wife, Diana. Their married life, however, is marred by the fact that the couple has no children after years of trying. At the last minute Diana backs down from adopting a Vietnamese orphan. She is determined to have a biological child. However, Marcos is sterile and has kept this a secret from his wife. When he tells her the truth, Diana reveals that she already knew it having recently consulted a gynecologist who told her that she can conceive.

Unfulfilled in her desire to have a child, Diana begins to pay attention to Juan, an attractive gas station attendant. Juan is a working class man who has been saving money to move to a comfortable apartment with his girlfriend, Charo. They are a month away from getting married. Diana's car has an oil leak and Juan helps her with this mechanical problem. A strong sexual attraction grows between them. Eduardo, one of Marco's wealthy friends, has always lust after the beautiful Diana, who has discourage his attentions. When Marcos travels on a business trip abroad, Eduardo invites Diana to go to a night club, where they coincide with Juan and his girlfriend Charo. That night Diana has an erotic dream about Juan. The next day, Diana visits Juan at the gas station where he works and they begin to go out. They soon embark on a passionate sexual affair.

Juan opens up to Diana and tells her about his life, but she keeps hers a mystery from him. Differences of experiences and social class quickly become apparent between the lovers. Marcos takes some time off from work and makes a trip with Diana to ski on the mountain. Diana cannot keep Juan out of her mind. Charo works as a secretary in a travel agency, her boss Baena lust after her, but she puts him in place.

As his relationship with Diana becomes evident, Juan is teased by Sebas, his young coworker. When Diana comes back from her trip to the mountains, she calls Juan again. They are reunited in the hotel room. By then, Juan is deeply in love and would like to have a more committed relationship with Diana, but she remains aloof. Baena, coincides with his mistress in the same hotel that Diana and Juan use for their clandestine encounters. He tells Charo that her boyfriend is having an affair. Juan and Charo have a confrontation as a result and he breaks their engagement.

Diana finds out that she is pregnant. She is very happy of having her long-held desire fulfilled. She comes clean with Juan telling him that she is in fact married and that she is carrying his baby, but breaks their relationship. Diana was not really in love with him, but used him to conceive the child that she wanted. Juan is heartbroken and angry. Diana confesses the truth to her bewildered husband. Marcos is worried about a scandal and he does not want to lose his wife. He coldly accepts the situation and arranges an encounter with his wife and her former lover. He offers money to Juan in exchange for his silence. Angry with them, Juan refuses and the two men end up in a fist fight.

When things seem to have settled in her favor, Diana suffers a miscarriage. Meanwhile, Juan comes back with Charo. She is still very much in love with him and forgives his infidelity. The couple rekindle their wedding plans. Men sent by Marcos give Juan a good beating to make clear to him that he has to forget the past.

Diana, coming out from her depression, set her eyes on a new man, a young athlete who has just won a swimming contest. Marcos observes in agreement from the distance.

== Cast ==
- Patxi Andión as Juan
- Amparo Muñoz as Diana
- Simón Andreu as Marcos
- Ricardo Merino as Eduardo
- Yolanda Ríos as Charo
- Chacho Lage as Sebas
- Vicky Lagos as Dama
- Juan Sala as Pablo
- Alberto Bové as Baena

== Production ==
The scrip was written by Eloy de la Iglesia and Rafael Sánchez Campoy based on a story written by novelist, poet and screenwriter Sánchez Campoy. Simón Andreu, who was Eloy de la Iglesia's favorite actor in this period of his career and starred in many of his films, has the role of the wealthy husband. The leads are played by Amparo Muñoz and Patxi Andión. Muñoz was very famous at that time having been Miss Spain and Miss Universe. Andión, a singer and actor, was also in charge of the music, singing the opening and closing songs of the film. Patxi Andión and Amparo Muñoz met while making this film and became a real life couple. They got married in 1976 and divorced two years later. The film was shot in Madrid and Navacerrada. It was successful at the box office. La otra alcoba is a typical film of the so-called cine de destape.

== Release ==
The film was released theatrically on 3 May 1976.

== See also ==
- List of Spanish films of 1976
