= Brigada Central =

Spanish television series (1989–1992)

- Genre: Police procedural
- Based on: Brigada Central by Juan Madrid
- Screenplay by: Pedro Masó; Jacques Labib (Note: Only season two.); Simon Michael
- Directed by: Pedro Masó
- Composer: Antón García Abril
- Countries of origin: Spain; Germany; Italy
- Original language: Spanish
- No. of seasons: 2
- No. of episodes: 26

Production
- Production companies: Televisión Española; Beta Film; R.C.S. Produzione
- Budget: 2.261 billion ₧

Original release
- Network: La Primera
- Release: 3 November 1989 – 7 December 1992

Brigada Central (transl. Central Brigade) is a Spanish prime-time police procedural television series based on the novel series of the same name by Juan Madrid. The series focuses on the day-to-day work of Manuel Flores (Imanol Arias), a Romani police inspector in an elite squad against organized crime.

Produced by Pedro Masó Producciones for Televisión Española (TVE), it was directed and written by Pedro Masó himself. The fourteen episodes of its first season were broadcast on La Primera of Televisión Española in 1989–1990. It was followed by a second season of twelve episodes titled Brigada Central II: La guerra blanca, co-produced with Beta Film from Germany and R.C.S. Produzione from Italy, that was first broadcast on TVE in 1992.

== Premise ==
The series shows the daily work of the elite police officers selected to join the special group of the Central Brigade, attached to the General Directorate of State Security, for high-level investigations, such as organized crime, international crime, or drug trafficking. Along with the professional work of its members, their psychological and personal aspect is also shown, focusing on the head of the group, Manuel Flores, a Romani police inspector.

In season two, Flores works as a representative of the Spanish police in the CETIS group, an elite group created at European level to fight against drug trafficking.

== Production ==
Brigada Central season one was produced by Pedro Masó Producciones for Televisión Española (TVE) with a budget of 756 million pesetas (€4.54 million). It was directed and written by Pedro Masó himself, who adapted the novels from the police novel series of the same name by Juan Madrid. Its fourteen episodes were first broadcast in prime-time on La Primera of Televisión Española between 3 November 1989 and 2 February 1990.

Brigada Central season two, titled Brigada Central II: La guerra blanca, was produced by Pedro Masó Producciones for TVE, in co-production with Beta Film from Germany and R.C.S. Produzione from Italy, with a budget of 1.505 billion pesetas (€9 million). It was also directed and written by Masó himself, who was supported in the writing by Jacques Labib and Simon Michael. It was filmed between April 1990 and June 1991 in more than twelve different international locations, including: Paris (France); Brussels and Antwerp (Belgium); Stuttgart, Baden-Baden and Frankfurt (Germany); Bogotá and Medellín (Colombia); Caracas (Venezuela); and Martinique. Its twelve episodes were first broadcast in prime-time on La Primera of Televisión Española between 4 October and 7 December 1992.

== Cast ==
=== Season one ===
- Imanol Arias as Chief Inspector Manuel Flores
- José Manuel Cervino as Commissioner Poveda
- Assumpta Serna as Julia
- Patxi Andión as Marchena
- Isabel Serrano as Carmela
- José Coronado as Lucas
- Pedro Díez del Corral as Solana
- Ana Duato as Virginia
- Arturo Querejeta as Pacheco
- Emma Ozores
- Juan Calot as Muriel
- Enrique Simón as Loren
- Pedro Civera as Ventura
- María José Goyanes
- Eusebio Lázaro as Joaquín
- Fernando Delgado
- Fernando Hilbeck as Prada
- Rosario Flores as Irene
- Rafael Álvarez as Zacarías Jorowisch
- José Vivó
- Féodor Atkine as Sousa
- José María Rodero as Rogelio Flores
- Fernando Guillén as Garrigues
- Nancho Novo
- María Luisa Ponte
- Silvia Clares Valiente as Manuel Flores' daughter

=== Season two ===
- Imanol Arias as Commissioner Manuel Flores
- Roland Giraud as Stan
- Margarita Rosa de Francisco as Marina Valdés
- José Manuel Cervino as Commissioner Poveda
- Ruddy Rodríguez as Claudia
- Jan Niklas
- Ray Lovelock
- Gustavo Angarita as Hipólito Valdés
- Féodor Atkine as Souza
- Paul Guers as Schneider
- Sophie Carle as Marina
- Jacques Dacqmine
- Zakariya Gouram as Laurence
- Olivier Marchal as Bebert
- Serge Ubrette as Martial

== Episodes ==
Season	Episodes	Originally released	
Season	Episodes	First released	Last released
1	14	3 November 1989	2 February 1990
2	12	4 October 1992	7 December 1992

=== Season one: Brigada Central ===
No. overall	No. in season	Title	Original release date	Spain viewers (millions)
1	1	"Flores El Gitano"	3 November 1989	13.5
2	2	"Sólo para los amigos"	10 November 1989	N/A
3	3	"Vistas al mar"	17 November 1989	N/A
4	4	"Último modelo"	24 November 1989	N/A
5	5	"Pies de plomo"	1 December 1989	N/A
6	6	"Asuntos de rutina"	8 December 1989	N/A
7	7	"Noche sin fin"	15 December 1989	N/A
8	8	"El ángel de la muerte"	22 December 1989	N/A
9	9	"El cebo"	29 December 1989	N/A
10	10	"Antigüedades"	5 January 1990	N/A
11	11	"Desde el pasado"	12 January 1990	9.0
12	12	"La dama de las camelias"	19 January 1990	N/A
13	13	"El hombre del reloj"	26 January 1990	N/A
14	14	"Turno de noche"	2 February 1990	N/A

=== Season two: Brigada Central II: La guerra blanca ===
No. overall	No. in season	Title	Original release date	Spain viewers (millions)
15	1	"Érase una vez dos polis"	4 October 1992	N/A
16	2	"La sospecha"	4 October 1992	N/A
17	3	"La trampa"	5 October 1992	N/A
18	4	"El encuentro"	12 October 1992	N/A
19	5	"Cita en Medellín"	19 October 1992	N/A
20	6	"La fiesta"	26 October 1992	N/A
21	7	"La caza del hombre"	2 November 1992	N/A
22	8	"La huida"	9 November 1992	N/A
23	9	"Bingo"	16 November 1992	N/A
24	10	"El banquero"	23 November 1992	N/A
25	11	"Los capos no mueren"	30 November 1992	N/A
26	12	"Los herederos"	7 December 1992	N/A

== Accolades ==
=== TP de Oro ===
Year	Category	Recipient	Result	Ref.
1989	Best Spanish Series		Won	
1989	Best Actor	Imanol Arias	Won	
1990	Best Spanish Series		Won	
1990	Best Actor	Imanol Arias	Won	
1990	Best Actor	José Coronado	Nominated	
1990	Best Actress	Assumpta Serna	Nominated	
