= Dedicatoria =

1980 film

- Directed by: Jaime Chávarri
- Written by: Jaime Chávarri; Elías Querejeta
- Produced by: Elías Querejeta
- Starring: Patricia Adriani
- Cinematography: Teo Escamilla
- Edited by: Pablo González del Amo
- Release date: 1980
- Country: Spain
- Language: Spanish

Dedicatoria is a 1980 Spanish drama film directed by Jaime Chávarri. It was entered into the 1980 Cannes Film Festival.

== Cast ==
- Patricia Adriani
- María Amezua
- Francisco Casares
- José Luis Gómez
- Claude Legros
- Marie Mansart
- Amparo Muñoz
- Hélène Peychayrand
- Luis Politti
- Juan Jesús Valverde
