= Clara is the Price =

1975 film

- VHS cover
- Directed by: Vicente Aranda
- Written by: Pedro Carvjal; Vicente Aranda
- Produced by: Jaime Fernández Cid
- Starring: Amparo Muñoz; Máximo Valverde; Juan Luis Galiardo Alejandro Ulloa
- Cinematography: Francisco Fraile
- Edited by: Pablo G. del Amo
- Music by: John Campbell
- Production company: Morgana Films
- Distributed by: Warner Española S.A.
- Release date: 30 April 1975
- Running time: 101 minutes
- Country: Spain
- Language: Spanish
- Box office: 349.516,23 €

Clara is the Price (Spanish: Clara es el precio) is a 1975 Spanish film directed by Vicente Aranda. It stars Amparo Muñoz, Máximo Valverde and Juan Luis Galiardo. It was shot in Cadaques, Empuriabrava (Girona), Delta del Ebro (Tarragona) and Barcelona.

== Plot ==
In a city on Spain's Costa Brava, Clara Valverde, a beautiful young woman, lives with her husband Juan. They seem to have a perfect marriage. Juan is an architect and has planned a daring urban project. In reality, the project is not viable. Clara, to keep her marriage and finances afloat, works as a porn actress in an underground film industry. In spite of her job and her marriage, Clara is still a virgin. Her marriage has never been consummated because her husband is impotent, for which she blames herself. In her work she does not allow herself to be penetrated. One day she goes to a meeting with Kellerman, an American millionaire who seems to be interested in bringing Juan's project to fruition. However, she soon learns that what he really wants is to blackmail her. The owner of the house, Jorge, finds out her occupation and threatens to tell her husband if she does not have sex with the American.

Clara is brutally raped by Kellerman. She then finds out that her husband is not impotent; he has had sex with other women, including Clara's friend. Juan has a homosexual relationship with Miguel, the director of the pornographic films. Armed with a gun, she takes revenge, killing Kellerman and humiliating Jorge and Miguel before shooting them too.

== Cast ==
- Amparo Muñoz as Clara Valverde
- Máximo Valverde as Juan
- Juan Luis Galiardo as Jorge
- Alejandro Ulloa as Kellerman
- Carmen de Lirio as Kellerman's wife
- Mario Pardo as Miguel
- Ivonne Sentís as Marta

== Production ==
The idea behind the film came from Pedro Carvajal who wrote the screenplay. From Madrid he went to Barcelona and persuaded director Vicente Aranda to take on the project. Aranda was initially reluctant, but accepted to direct the film after making substantial changes to the script. However this is the only film in Aranda's long career in which he did not sign the script.

For the leading role of Clara, Aranda cast Amparo Muñoz, who was then not yet eighteen and had recently been elected Miss Spain. She was not a trained actress and this was her first film. Juan Luis Galiardo and Maximo Valverde, two popular heartthrobs of Spanish cinema during the 1970s, were chosen for the male leads playing against type, one as a homosexual and the other as an impotent husband.

With a budget of 9 million pesetas, the film was shot in studios in Barcelona and exteriors in Cadaques, Empuriabrava (Girona) and Delta del Ebro (Tarragona). The original title of the film, Pornografia (pornography), was banned by censors and was changed to Clara es el precio (Clara is the price).
