= In Memoriam (1977 film) =

- Directed by: Enrique Brasó
- Written by: Adolfo Bioy Casares; Enrique Brasó; José María Carreño; Juan Tébar
- Produced by: José Luis Borau; Emiliano Piedra
- Starring: Geraldine Chaplin; José Luis Gómez
- Cinematography: Teo Escamilla
- Edited by: Guillermo S. Maldonado
- Music by: Luis Eduardo Aute
- Release date: 2 September 1977 (Spain)
- Running time: 100 minutes
- Country: Spain
- Language: Spanish

In Memoriam is the 1977 Spanish directorial debut of Enrique Brasó. The film is based on a story by the Argentine writer, Adolfo Bioy Casares. The film explores the thwarted romance between Julio (José Luis Gómez) and Paulina (Geraldine Chaplin). Brasó collaborated with Chaplin again, as a writer in In the City Without Limits (2002) and Oculto (2005). In Memoriam was released in Spain on 2 September 1977.

== Plot ==
In pre-war Madrid, Julio, a shy writer fails to communicate his feelings towards Paulina, the woman he loves. She instead becomes involved with another writer who has no issue with communicating his feelings. A heartbroken Julio leaves Madrid for Cambridge but is shocked at what he discovers when he returns. The shocking truth is that Paulina has been dead for many years, murdered by her lover in a jealous rage after seeing Julio off on his journey to Cambridge.

== Cast ==
- Geraldine Chaplin as Paulina Arevalo
- José Luis Gómez as Julio Montero
- Eduardo Calvo as Senor Segreras
- Emilio Fornet
