= Román Alís =

Spanish composer (1931–2006)

Román Alís (1931 – 2006) was a Spanish composer. He was born in Palma de Mallorca on August 24, 1931, and died in Madrid on 29 October 2006.

== Education and training ==
Román Alís' interest in music emerged in Barcelona in 1947, encouraged by the cultural movement in that city, absent in other populations in which his life had developed earlier. While pursuing his musical studies at the Conservatorio Superior Municipal de Música in Barcelona, alongside instructors such as Luis Maria Millet, John Gibert Camins, John Pich Santasusana, Joachim Zamacois and Eduard Toldrá, popular music became very important in his early career. Performer, conductor, arranger, and composer worked for big bands, publishers, record labels, and radio. This certainly would not have been possible without his spontaneous ease of creation, which made him compose a large number of works from the start.

== Career ==
After moving to Seville in 1960, he obtained the following year the First Place Grand Prize for Composition in the Divonne-Les-Bains International Contest held in Paris. There he was honoured by the organization, the jury, the press and the French Radiotelevisión, and was able to meet personally with musicians such as Olivier Messiaen, René Leibowitz, Jean Rivier and Louis Aubert. A few months later he retired to Divonne-les-Bains, a town very close to Geneva (Switzerland), and launched the Symphonie de Chambre, Op 27 (1962) for chamber orchestra. Later, in his time as a professor at Contrapunto y Fuga del Conservatorio in Seville, he was recognized as an important figure in the Sevillian musical life where he debuted a large number of works.

== Biography ==
1931
Born on August 24, in Palma de Mallorca.
1940
Because of his father's job, moved to Vigo, where he started his baccalaureate with the Marist Sisters. He discovered the piano.
1944
Moved in Residences in Zaragoza, where he continues his baccalaureate. He started to compose his first piano pieces.
1947
Moved to Barcelona, finishing his baccalaureate.
1948-59
Román studied music at the Superior Municipal Conservatory of Music in Barcelona, with Rafael Gálvez, Luis María Millet, Juan Gibert Camins, Juan Pich Santasusana, Joaquín Zamacois, and Eduard Toldrá. He then graduated in Piano, Composition, and Orchestra Conducting. He started to come out as a pianist during those years.
1950
Moved to the city of Mataró.
1951
Arranger, pianist and director of Big bands. Premiered his first compositions at the Maresma Radio.
1952
Made military service in Ceuta; founded and directed the Coral Transfer.

Collaborated with the Conservatory of Ceuta.

1954
Resumed his musical studies and professional activities.
1955
He settled in Barcelona and continued his training, acting as accompanist in chamber groups and national radio stations in Barcelona and other Catalan cities.
1956
Was musical director of ballets at Francesc Moragas and Esbart Verdaguer and at the Chamber Orchestra of the Caixa. Premiered at the Palau de la Musica Catalana in Barcelona his first ballets. Worked with the Vocal Musical Youth Barcelona.
1957
Orchestra Manager at Protest Art Association in the National Palace of Montjuic. Offered several lectures in Barcelona and other Catalan towns.

Debuted in Palma de Mallorca Print Op 6 (1952) for violin and piano.

1958
Acted and presented his work at the International Courses of Cultural Extension of the Principality of Andorra and the Ateneo of Barcelona.
1960
Moved to Seville. Collaborated as a compositor, arranger with the Fiesta publishers in Seville and Dakotam.
1961
Obtained the First Great International Composition Prize of Divonne-Les-Bains, held in Paris, and his work was interpreted at the Salle Gaveau in the French capital, where he met composers such as Olivier Messiaen, Bacarisse Salvador, Pierre Colombo, among others, who were members of the jury.

Tribute and reception of the Embassy of Spain in Paris, Patrons and Jury held at Maxim's in Paris.

To be continued

== Catalog of works ==
Catalogue of works by Román Alís
Year	Opus	Work	Type of Work	Length
1947	(f.c.)*	La danza de los muñecos for piano.	Solo Music (piano)	
1947	(f.c.)	Pequeña pieza for piano.	Solo Music (piano)	
1948	(f.c.)	Sonata for two pianos.	Solo Music (piano)	
1948	(f.c.)	Sonatina for piano.	Solo Music (piano)	
1948	(f.c.)	2nd Sonatina for piano.	Solo Music (piano)	
1948	(f.c.)	Waltz for piano.	Solo Music (piano)	
1948	Opus 001	Eu so nunca sospiro, Op. 1 for soprano and piano	Voice music (piano)	
1948	(f.c.)	Barcarola for piano.	Solo Music (piano)	
1948	(f.c.)	Prelude for piano.	Solo Music (piano)	
1948	(f.c.)	2nd Sonata for piano.	Solo Music (piano)	
1948	Opus 002	Suite for piano, Op. 2	Solo Music (piano)	
1948	(f.c.)	2nd Waltz for piano.	Solo Music (piano)	
1950	(f.c.)	8 lessons for piano.	Solo Music (piano)	
1950	Opus 004	Pentacordos, Op. 4 for piano	Solo Music (piano)	
1950	(f.c.)	Kyrie for voces u organ.	Voice music (organ)	
1950	(f.c.)	Nocturno for piano.	Solo Music (piano)	
1950	Opus 003	Sola..., Op. 3 for soprano and piano	Voice music (piano)	
1950	(f.c.)	3rd Sonata for piano.	Solo Music (piano)	
1950	Opus 005	Teño medo, Op. 5 for soprano and piano	Voice music (piano)	
1951	(f.c.)	1st Fantasía for piano.	Solo Music (piano)	
1951	(f.c.)	2nd Fantasía for piano.	Solo Music (piano)	
1951	(f.c.)	3rd Fantasía for piano.	Solo Music (piano)	
1951	(f.c.)	3rd Waltz for piano.	Solo Music (piano)	
1952	(f.c.)	2 pieces for piano.	Solo Music (piano)	
1952	Opus 005	Impresión, Op. 6 for violin and piano	Chamber music (violin and piano)	
1952	(f.c.)	Meditación for trumpet, celesta, harp and string.	Instrumental music	
1952	(f.c.)	Meditación symphony for flute, oboe, clarinet, bassoon and strings.	Instrumental music	
1952	(f.c.)	2nd Nocturno for piano.	Solo Music (piano)	
1952	(f.c.)	3rd Nocturno for piano.	Solo Music (piano)	
1952	(f.c.)	Sol de la mañana for soprano and piano.	Voice music (piano)	
1952	(f.c.)	4th Sonata for piano.	Solo Music (piano)	
1952	(f.c.)	Sonata for violin and piano.	Chamber music (violin and piano)	
1952	(f.c.)	1st Toccata for violin and piano.	Chamber music (violin and piano)	
1952	(f.c.)	2nd Toccata for violin and piano.	Chamber music (violin and piano)	
1952	(f.c.)	Trio for flute, violin and piano.	Chamber music	
1953	(f.c.)	5 corals «spiritualities» for choir.	Choir music	
1953	Opus 006bis	Impresión no. 2, Op. 6 bis for flute and piano.	Chamber music (violin and piano)	
1953	(f.c.)	La mare de deu d’agosto for choir.	Choir music	
1953	(f.c.)	Voces del alma no I for violin and piano.	Chamber music (violin and piano)	
1954	Opus 007	O toque da alba, Op. 7 for soprano and piano	Voice music (piano)	
1954	(f.c.)	Pequeña pieza for clarinet and piano.	Chamber music	
1954	(f.c.)	Symphonic poem for voices and orchestra.		
1953	-	Poems for cobla	Cobla Music	
1954	(f.c.)	Voces del alma no 2 for violin and piano.	Chamber music (violin and piano)	
1955	Opus 009	Agora, Op. 9 for soprano and piano	Voice music (piano)	
1955	Opus 008	Huacca-China, Op. 8 for soprano and musical ensemble [Ciudad durmiente - El sueño del caimán]		
1955	(f.c.)	Jardiner de la reina for contralto and piano.	Voice music (piano)	
1955	(f.c.)	Trio for violin, cello and piano.	Chamber music	
1955	(f.c.)	Un tiempo de quartet for string quartet.	Chamber music	
1955	(f.c.)	Voces del alma no. 3 for violin and piano.	Chamber music (violin and piano)	
1956	-	Ball de Garlandes for cobla	Cobla Music	
1956	-	L’Esquerrana for cobla	Cobla Music	
1956	Opus 011	Meu pensamento, Op. 11 for soprano and piano	Música vocal (piano)	
1951	Opus 010	No eres, Op. 10 for voice and piano	Voice music (piano)	
1956	(f.c.)	Voces del alma nº 4 for violin and piano.	Chamber music (violin and piano)	
1957	Opus 013	Adiós, Op. 13 for soprano and piano	Voice music (piano)	
1957	-	Contrapás for cobla	Cobla Music	
1957	-	Cuadro de mar for cobla	Cobla Music	
1957	Opus 012	Cuatro piezas breves, Op. 12 for piano	Solo Music (piano)	
1957	-	Majorales for cobla	Cobla Music	
1957	-	Pere Galleri for cobla	Cobla Music	
1957	-	Pitulineta for cobla	Cobla Music	
1957	-	Xatulineta for cobla	Cobla Music	
1958	Opus 015	Cada noite, Op. 15 for soprano and piano	Voice music (piano)	
1958	Opus 014	El mariner, Op. 14 for voice and piano	Voice music (piano)	
1958	Opus 016	Noemi, Op. 16 for mixed choir	Choir music	
1958	Opus 018	Poems from Baja Andalucía, Op. 18 for piano [Niños - Nubes - Fiesta - Siesta - Canción]	Solo Music (piano)	
1958	Opus 017	Poesía de estío, Op. 17 for mixed choir	Choir music	
1958	Opus 020	Al lado de mi cabaña, Op. 20 for voice and piano		
1959	Opus 019	Alleluia, Op. 19 for mixed choir	Choir music	
1959	Opus 021	Pater noster, Op. 21 for mixed choir	Choir music	
1960	Opus 022	string quartet, Op. 22	Chamber music	
1960	Opus 023	Pastorcito que te vas, Op. 23 for voice and piano	Voice music (piano)	
1961	Opus 024	Music for ten instruments, Op. 24		
1961	Opus 025	Poems from la seguiriya gitana, Op. 25 for voice and piano [Paisaje - Sorpresa - Baladilla de los tres ríos]	Voice music (piano)	
1961	Opus 026	Sonatina, Op. 26 for piano	Solo Music (piano)	
1962	Opus 027	Symphonie de chambre, Op. 27 for chamber orchestra ( E: VIII Divonne-les-Bains International Chamber music Festival, Teatro del Parque, Divonne-les-Bains (Francia) – 2.7.1962 – orchestra de Cámara de Genève, dir Pierre Colombo; G: RSR. Encargo del Festival de Divonne-les-Bains. A Fleury Creton, Louis-Bernard Levy y Maurice Werner.)	Orchestral music	20:00
1962	Opus 028	Sonata for flute and piano, Op. 28	Chamber music	
1962	Opus 031	Variaciones breves, Op. 31 for orchestra (E: Teatro Lope de Vega, Sevilla – 16.12.1962 – Agrupación de Cámara de Sevilla, dir Luis Izquierdo. A Luis Izquierdo. The work has 42 variations.)	Orchestral music	
1963	Opus 038	Hacia Belem, Op. 38 for the mixed choir to three voices (Ist version)	Choir music	
1963	Opus 036	Nocturnos de la luna gitana, Op. 36 for soprano and instrumental ensemble [Allegro del verde viento - Andante, quasi preludio del alba - Lento de la pena morena]		
1963	Opus 034	Preludio y cante, Op. 34 for flute	Solo Music (flute)	
1963	Opus 032	Sonata for guitar, Op. 32	Solo Music (guitar)	
	Opus 035	Espejismos Sonoros, Op. 35, for guitar	Solo Music (guitar)	
	Opus 037	Salmo XXI de David, Op. 37 for choir and instrumental ensemble	Choir music (instruments)	
1963	Opus 039	Tres corales de estío, Op. 39 for mixed choir [Recuerdas - Aguas puras de tu amor - Cavaré...]	Choir music	
1964	Opus 040	Canciones de mirador, Op. 40 for voice and piano [Marina - Molinos de viento - Campo y cielo]		
1964	Opus 044	Coral, tema e imitación, Op. 44 for organ	Solo Music (organ)	
1964	Opus 041	Cuatro imágenes playeras, Op. 41 for piano [Amanecer de estío - Mar andaluza - Orilla marismeña - Nocturno de luna marinera]	Solo Music (piano)	
1964	Opus 047	Two movements for strings, Op. 47 for string orchestra [1. Lento dolcissimo – 2. Allegro vivo e con brio] (E: Palau de la Música Catalana, Barcelona – 7.3.1965 – orchestra de Cámara de Barcelona, dir Antoni Ros Marbá. A Antoni Ros Marbá. I Premio Alemany i Vall de Juventudes Musicales de Barcelona.)	Orchestral music	14:00
1964	Opus 048	Fum, fum, fum, Op. 48 for mixed choir	Choir music	
	Opus 049	Four Pieces for Sax, Op. 49	Solo Music	
1964	Opus 046	Sinfonietta, Op. 46 for orchestra (1. Allegro con allegreza – 2. Andante un poco lento quasi adagio – 3. Allegro con brio) (E: Teatro Lope de Vega, Sevilla – 8.9.1964 – orchestra Filarmónica de Sevilla, dir Luis Izquierdo; G: RNE "A Albertina Domínguez, mi futura esposa".)	Orchestral music	21:00
1964	Opus 045	Sonata for piano, Op. 45	Solo Music (piano)	
1964	Opus 042	Tema con variaciones, Op. 42 for piano	Solo Music (piano)	
1964	Opus 043	Trio for violin, cello and piano, Op. 43	Chamber music	
1966	Opus 056	Estudio I for violin and piano, Op. 56	Chamber music (violin and piano)	
1966	Opus 058	Estudio for trompa and piano, Op. 58	Chamber music	
1966	Opus 057	Estudio for viola and piano, Op. 57	Chamber music	
1966	Opus 052	Opus cámara, Op. 52 for piano	Solo Music (piano)	
1966	Opus 054	Sonata for clarinet and piano, Op. 54	Chamber music	
1966	Opus 050	Suite for orchestra, Op. 50 [1. Fanfarria – 2. Allemande – 3. Courante – 4. Zarabanda – 5. Giga] (E: Teatro San Fernando, Sevilla – 6.3.1966 – orchestra Filarmónica de Sevilla, dir Román Alís)	Orchestral music	17:00
1967	Opus 059	Estudio II for violin and piano, Op. 59	Chamber music (violin and piano)	
1967	Opus 062	Estudio for double bass and piano, Op. 62	Chamber music	
1967	Opus 061	Estudio for cello and piano, Op. 61	Chamber music	
1967	Opus 064	Misa simple, Op. 64 for mixed choir y organ [Kyrie - Agnus - Credo - Sanctus - Gloria]		
1967	Opus 060	Music for un Festival en Sevilla, Op. 60 for orchestra [1. Sonatina del alba – 2. Cantares a la siesta del estío – 3. Nocturnos de fiestas] (E: XIII Festival de Sevilla, Festivales de España, Teatro Lope de Vega, Sevilla – 22.9.1967 – orchestra Filarmónica de Sevilla, dir Luis Izquierdo G: RNE) Premio de Arte de la Excelentísima Diputación de Sevilla (1967).)	Orchestral music	15:00
1967	Opus 065	Preludio, fantasía y tocata, Op. 65 for piano	Solo Music (piano)	
1968	Opus 071	Atmósferas, Op. 71 for clarinet and piano	Chamber music	
1968	Opus 069	Frase, Op. 69 for piano	Solo Music (piano)	
1968	Opus 070 (f.c.)	Sintonía, Op. 70 for orchestra (El original se halla extraviado en los archivos de RTVE.)	Orchestral music	
1968	Opus 066	Tocata a la fuga de un ritmo gitano, Op. 66 for piano	Solo Music (piano)	
1968	Opus 067	Tres piezas for organ, Op. 67	Solo Music (organ)	
1969	Opus 072	Los días de la semana, Op. 72 for piano [Lunes (la Luna) - Martes (Marte) - Miércoles (Mercurio) - Jueves (Júpiter) - Viernes (Venus) - Sábado (Saturno) - Domingo (el Sol) ]	Solo Music (piano)	
1969	Opus 080	Los salmos cósmicos, Op. 80. Superposiciones coral-symphonies about a song to the universe. (Lyrics by Román Alís based on an interpretation of the Psalms). 4 mixed choirs and orchestra. Commissioned by the Juan March Foundation. The original manuscript of the work is in the Library of Contemporary Music of the Juan March Foundation in Madrid.)	Orchestral music	50:00
1969	Opus 077	Eight popular Spanish songs, Op. 77 for piano [Ya se van los pastores (Leonesa) - Romance de ciego (Gallega) - Morito, pititón (Burgalesa) - Mi abuelo tenía un huerto (Asturiana) - La pastorcita (Catalana) - El marinero (Catalana) - El ermitaño (Leonesa) - Canción de Olivareros (Mallorquina)]	Solo Music (piano)	
1969	Opus 073	Suite for guitar, Op. 73	Solo Music (guitar)	
1969	Opus 079	Variaciones melódicas for oboes, Op. 79	Solo Music (oboe)	
1970	Opus 083	El cant de Lorelei, Op. 83 for soprano and piano [Deliri - Image - La nit morta]	Voice music (piano)	
1970	Opus 085	Reverberaciones, Op. 85 for orchestra (E: Teatro Real, Madrid – 18.10.1970 – orchestra Symphony de la Radiotelevisión Española (OSRTVE), dir Enrique García Asensio - G: RNE) «A Enrique García Asensio».)	Orchestral music	13:00
1970	Opus 081	Rima, Op. 81 for soprano and piano	Voice music (piano)	
1971	Opus 091	Discantus atonalis, Op. 91 for piano	Solo Music (piano)	
1971	Opus 093	Dodecafonías, Op. 93 for flute and piano	Chamber music	
1971	Opus 090	Fuente clara, Op. 90 for mixed choir	Choir music	
1971	Opus 088	La cuarta palabra de Cristo en la cruz, Op. 88 for piano	Solo Music (piano)	
1971	Opus 087	Series sobre anillos, Op. 87 for string quartet	Chamber music	
1972	Opus 098	Cuatro piezas for dos violas, Op. 98 [Fabordón - Gymel - Discantus - Organum]		
1972	Opus 095	Espoir, Op. 95 for mezzo-soprano and piano	Voice music (piano)	
1972	Opus 097	Quien tanto veros desea, Op. 97 for mixed choir	Choir music	
1973	Opus 099	Campus stellae, Op. 99 for musical ensemble	Instrumental music	
1973	Opus 101	El Sommi, Op. 101 for soprano and musical ensemble	Voice music (instrumental)	
1973	Opus 100	Epitafios cervantinos, Op. 100 for soprano, contralto, tenor, bass, choir and orchestra (Miguel de Cervantes) (1. Al caballero mal andante y a Sancho su escudero – 2. A Dulcinea rolliza y fea – 3. Al hidalgo loco y cuerdo.) (E: Semanas Cervantinas de Alcalá de Henares, Capilla de San Ildefonso de la Universidad, Alcalá de Henares, Madrid – 26.4.1973 – Elvira Padín, Vida Bastos, José Foronda, Jesús Zazo, Madrid Orchestra Symphony (OSM), dir Vicente Spiteri. G: RNE) Commissioned by the Commissioner General of music intended for Cervantes Weeks in Alcalá de Henares. "At Antonio Iglesias." There is a bound copy in the collection of the Cervantes Municipal Music Library in Madrid.)	Choir music	39:00
1974	Opus 102	La flor de la cañada, Op. 102 for mixed choir	Choir music	
1975	Opus 104	Dilataciones, Op. 104 for piano	Solo Music (piano)	
1975	Opus 103	El sueño de un poeta, Op. 103 for mixed choir	Choir music	
1975	Opus 108	Juguetes, Op. 108 for piano [La ratita saltarina - La muñeca andarina - El gatito dormilón - El osito blanco - El viejo mago - El caballo de cartón - El pequeño bebé]	Solo Music (piano)	
1976	Opus 112	Cántico for organ and orchestra, Op. 112 (E: Catedral, Sevilla – 6.12.1976 – José Ayarra, orchestra Filarmónica de Sevilla, dir Luis Izquierdo. Encargo de la Caja de Ahorros San Fernando de Sevilla.)	Orchestral music	16:00
1977	Opus 116	Balada de las cuatro cuerdas, Op. 116 for viola and piano	Chamber music	
1977	Opus 115	Rondó de danzas breves, Op. 115 for piano	Solo Music (piano)	
1977	Opus 117	Tres canciones amorosas for Contxa, Op. 117, for voz and piano [Otoño - Plenitud - Encuentro]		
1978	Opus 120	Aleluyas a la Resurección de Cristo, Op. 120 for mixed choir y conjunto musical [Aleluya de la Tierra - Aleluya de los Cielos - Aleluya de los Hombres - Aleluya de los Muertos - Aleluya del Universo]		
1978	Opus 124	Meeres Stille, Op. 124 for voice and piano	Voice music (piano)	
1978	Opus 121	Salauris, Op. 121 for orchestra (E: Festival de Chamber music, Cambrils, Tarragona – 6.7.1978 – orchestra del Festival de Cambrils, dir Román Alís.) Encargo del festival de Cambrils)	Orchestral music	14:00
1978	Opus 118	Todos los niños cantan y bailan, Op. 118 Ballet infantil basado en temas populares de carácter infantil, for cuerpo de baile, coro de niños y orchestra infantil (melódica, 4 flutes de pico, 2 violines, carillón soprano y alto, xilófono soprano, alto y bajo, 2 percusionistas, piano, 2 guitars) {1. Introducción – 2. Antón pirulero – 3. Qué hermoso pelo tienes – 4. La viudita del Conde Laurel – 5. Tengo una muñeca – 6. Mambrú se fue a la guerra – 7. Que llueva – 8. El patio de mi casa – 9. Cucú cantaba la rana – 10. Quisiera ser tan alta...} (E: Centro Cultural de la Villa, Madrid – 18.2.1978 – Ballet infantil de Ana Lázaro, Agrupación Coral-instrumental de Juventudes Musicales de Alcalá de Henares, dir Ángel Manzanal, encargo de Ana Lázaro.)	Ballet	120:00
1979	Opus 128	Concert for recorder and strings, Op. 128 [I. Moderato tranquilo –2. Allegretto expresivo] (E: Festival Internacional de Música de Cambrils, Pinaret de Carles Roig, Cambrils, Tarragona – 21.7.1979 – Mariano Martín, orchestra del Festival (Strings section), dir Román Alís. - G: RNE)		11:00
1979	Opus 127	María de Mágdala, Op. 127. Oratorio for soprano, recitador, corno inglés, mixed choir and orchestra de cuerda. (Texto de Román Alís) [1. Al alba del Yon Rischom – 2. La Noemi del valle – 3. La colina de la calavera] (E: XVIII Semana de la Música Religiosa de Cuenca, Iglesia de San Miguel, Cuenca – 12.4.1979 – María Orán, Antonio Medina, Jesús María Corral, Coro de la Agrupación Española de Cámara de Madrid, dir Odón Alonso (choir dir Pascual Ortega) - G: RNE) Encargo de la XVIII Semana de Música Religiosa de Cuenca.)	Oratorio	36:00
1980	Opus 130	Cántico de las soledades, Op. 130 for orchestra (E: Teatro Real, Madrid – 29.2.1980 – orchestra Nacional de España (ONE), dir Antoni Ros Marbá.) «A Laura Negro». Commissioned by National Orchestra of Spain (ONE).)	Orchestral music	26:00
1981	Opus 132	Tañimiento, Op. 132 for guitar	Solo Music (guitar)	
1981	Opus 131	Tres hojitas madre, Op. 131 for mixed choir	Choir music	
1982	Opus 135	Ámbitos, Op. 135 for loud saxophone	Solo Music (sax)	
1982	Opus 136	Arriba Galán, Op. 136 for mixed choir	Choir music	
1982	Opus 133	Tierra del alba, Op. 133 for mixed choir	Choir music	
1983	Opus 138	Canços de la Roda del Temps, Op. 138. (Salvador Espriu) Ciclo de canciones for soprano, harp and string orchestra. [I. Cançó d'albada – II. Cançó de la mort a l'alba – III. Cançó de la plenitud del mati – IV. Cançó del mati encalmat – V. Cançó de la mort resplendet – VI. Cançó de la vinguda de la tarda – VII. Cançó de pas de la tarda – VIII. Cançó del capvespre – IX. Cançó de la mort callada – X. Cançó del triomf de la nit – XI. Per a ser cantada en la meva nit – XII. Just abans de laudes] (Existe una reducción for voice and piano) (E: Iglesia de Santo Tomás, Avilés, Asturias – 11.4.1984 – Carmen Bustamante, orchestra Symphony de Asturias, dir Víctor Pablo Pérez - G: RNE (3, 8, 9 y 12) – LP) Encargo privado. Existe una reducción for soprano and piano realizada por el author)	Voice music	21:00
1983	Opus 137	Cantiga de aldeanus, Op. 137 for mixed choir	Choir music	
1983	Opus 140	Melody, Op. 140 for violin and piano	Chamber music (violin and piano)	
1983	Opus 139	Tú, Op. 139 for voice and piano (There is a version for cello and piano with the title Canción)		
1984	Opus 142	Septentrión, Op. 142 for instrumental ensemble [Alfa - Beta - Delta - Eta - Epsilon - Gamma - Zeta]		
1984	Opus 144	Sonad campanitas, Op. 144 for soprano and piano	Voice music (piano)	
1985	Opus 145	Cantiga astur, Op. 145 for soprano, mixed choir and orchestra (Popular lyrics). (1. Allegro mosso e con brio – 2. Añada. Moderato tierno y expresivo, un poco rubato – 3. Vivo con brío y muy rítmico); E: Solemne Acto de Entrega de los Premios Príncipe de Asturias, Teatro Campoamor, Oviedo – 5.10.1985 – Josefina Arsegui, Coro de la Fundación Principado de Asturias, orchestra Symphony de Asturias, dir Víctor Pablo Pérez (dir coro Víctor Pablo Pérez) Encargo de la Fundación Príncipe de Asturias. Dedicada al Excelentísimo Señor Don Pedro Masaveu.)		35:00
1985	Opus 141	Jesucristo en el desierto, Op. 141 oratorio for barítono mixed choir and orchestra (Texto de las Sagradas Escrituras). (E (1st word): VII Semana de Música de Avilés, iglesia de Santo Tomás, Avilés, Asturias – 11.4.1984 – Gregorio Poblador, Capilla Polifónica Ciudad de Oviedo, Asturias Symphony Orchestra, dir Víctor Pablo Pérez - E (integral): VII Semana de Música de Avilés, Catedral, Oviedo, Asturias – 27.3.1985 – Alfonso Echevarría, Oviedo University Choir, Asturias Symphony Orchestra, dir Víctor Pablo Pérez (choir dir Miguel A. Campos). Encargo de la Semana de Música de Áviles.	Oratorio	47:00
1985	Opus 143	Les chalumeaux gracieux, Op. 143 for dos clarinets [Divertimento - Canon - Fughetta - Motivo - Ostinato - Waltz- Final]		
1985	Opus 146	Melody, Op. 146 for violin and piano	Chamber music (violin and piano)	
1986	Opus 147	Melody, Op. 147 for violin and piano	Chamber music (violin and piano)	
1986	Opus 148	Melody, Op. 148 for violin and piano	Chamber music (violin and piano)	
1987	Opus 149	Homenatge an Antoni Gaudí, Op. 149 for orchestra. Cantic simfonic (E: Palau de la Música Catalana, Barcelona – 4.4.1987 – Ciutat de Barcelona orchestra (OCB), dir Víctor Pablo Pérez; G: RNE) Encargo de la Orquestra Ciutat de Barcelona.)	Orchestral music	19:00
1987	Opus 150	Homage to Federico Mompou, Op. 150 for orchestra (E: Teatro Campoamor, Oviedo – 12.11.1987 – orchestra Symphony de Asturias, dir Víctor Pablo Pérez; G: RNE Commissioned by the Asturias Symphony Orchestra.)	Orchestral music	25:00
1988	Opus 151	Melody, Op. 151 for violin and piano	Chamber music (violin and piano)	
1989	Opus 152	Autol, Op. 152. 42'; Cuatro estampas symphonies for orchestra [1. Amanecer. El río Cidacos y el desfiladero – 2. La ermita de la Virgen de Nieva – 3. La leyenda del viejo castillo – 4. El picuezo y la picueza] (Estreno: Auditorio Municipal, Logroño – 9.6.1989 – orchestra Symphony de Euskadi, dir Manuel Galduf. Encargo de la Asociación Promúsica Fermín Gurbindo. «A la memoria de Fermín Gurbindo».)	Orchestral music	42:00
1989	Opus 155	Concierto for piano y orchestra de cuerda, Op. 155 [I. Adaggietto affecttuoso – 2. Allegrissimo spiritoso – 3. Allegro moderato e con brío] (E: Teatro Principal, Alicante – 29.11.1991 – José Ortiga, orchestra de la Comunidad de Madrid, dir Miguel Groba. Encargo de la ONCE. «A José Ortiga».)	Orchestral music	34:00
1989	Opus 153	Fantasía for guitar, Op. 153	Solo Music (guitar)	
1989	Opus 038	Hacia Belem, Op. 38 for mixed choir a cuatro voces (2ª versión)	Choir music	
1989	Opus 154	Himno de la Liga Naval Española, Op. 154 for male choir and band		
1989	Opus 156	Sonata for two violins, Op. 156	Chamber music	
1990	Opus 158	Discantus Sobre el Salmo XLVI de David, Op. 158 for female choir	Choir music	
1990	Opus 160	Melody, Op. 160 for violin and piano	Chamber music (violin and piano)	
1991	Opus 161	Aria y danza, Op. 161 for orchestra [1. Aria – 2. Danza] (E: Auditorio Nacional, Madrid – 11.4.1991 – orchestra Nacional de España (ONE), dir Luis Aguirre.) «A Laura Negro»	Orchestral music	12:00
1991	Opus 163	Estampas del Madrid goyesco, Op. 163 (Andrés Ruiz Tarazona) for mixed choir and orchestra [I. Pórtico. Ronda de Seguidillas. Baile de majas en el Manzanares – II. Camino del Pardo. El Majo de la guitar – III. Trocha de la insurrección. The May 3 shoutings in the Príncipe Pío mountains] (Preestreno): Ermita de San Marcos, San martín de la Vega, Madrid, Madrid Community Choir, dir Miguel Groba - E: Auditorio Nacional de Música, Madrid – 2.5.1991 – Madrid Community Choir, dir Miguel Groba - G: CD – MC). Commissioned by the Madrid Community.)	Choir music	30:00
1991	Opus 165	Evocando al poeta... Rubén Darío, Op. 165. Cuatro canciones for soprano y orchestra. (Texto de Rubén Darío) [I. Dice mía. – II. ¡Aleluya!. – III. Vésper – IV. Pájaros de las islas] (Existe una versión for soprano and piano) (E: Auditorium, Palma de Mallorca – 30.1.199 – Enriqueta Tarrés, Baleares Symphony Orchestra, dir Anthony Moors Commissioned by the Baleares Symphony Orchestra.)	Voice music (orchestral)	30:00
1991	Opus 166	Melody, Op. 166 for violin and piano	Chamber music (violin and piano)	
1991	Opus 164	Variaciones ornamentales, Op. 164 for violin		
1992	Opus 167	Sonata for loud sax and piano, Op. 167		
1993	Opus 171	Canción de la vanidad, Op. 171 for mixed choir	Choir music	
1993	Opus 170	Para Ángela, Op. 170 for piano		
1993	Opus 168	Passaglia for trumpet and organ, Op. 168		
1994	Opus 172	Tres bagatelas, Op. 172 for loud saxophone and piano		
1995	Opus 173	Canciones visnavas, Op. 173 for soprano, flute and piano [Esta mañana - Saki]	Voice music (instrumental)	
1995	Opus 175	Sis remembranças a Eduard Toldrá, Op. 175, for violin and string orchestra [I. Sol ixent (vilanova i la Geltrú) – 2. La renaixença (Barcelona) 3. La noia que semblava una melody de Schumann (Castelló d'Empuries) – 4. La casona d'estiu (Cantallops) – 5. La Ciseta – 6. Sol ponent] (E: Concierto Homenaje an Eduard Toldrá, Sala Cultural de Caja Madrid, Barcelona – 26.10.1995 – Manuel Villuendas, orchestra de Cámara Eduard Toldrá, dir Manuel Villuendas - G: RNE)		34:00
1996	Opus 176	Adagietto, Op. 176 for string quartet		
1996		Canción for cello and piano	Chamber music	
1996	Opus 180	Resonancias de la Antequeruela alta, Op. 180 for clave		
1996	Opus 133	Tierra del alba, Op. 133 for string quartet	Chamber music	
1997	Opus 184	Accordaos, Op. 184 for soprano and piano	Voice music (piano)	
1997	Opus 186	Céfiros al alba de Sunion, Op. 186 for large mixed choir	Choir music	
1997	Opus 182	Introducció a mort de dama, Op. 182 [El barri antic - Els gats - A l’altre cap de la ciutat]		
1997	Opus 187	La noche santa, Op. 187 for mixed choir	Choir music	
1997	Opus 181	Saxoxas, Op. 181 for loud saxophone and piano		
1997	Opus 185	Tres morfologías, Op. 185 for violin and cello		
1997	Opus 183	Trio for flute, clarinet and piano, Op. 183	Chamber music	
1998	Opus 188	Reverie, Op. 188. Ensueño sinfónico for orchestra (E: XIV Festival Internacional de Música Contemporánea de Alicante, Teatro Principal, Alicante – 24.9.1998 – orchestra Nacional de Oporto, dir Manuel Ivo Cruz; G: RNE Encargo del Centro for la Difusión de la Música Contemporánea (CDMC) del Ministerio de Cultura for el Festival Internacional de Música Contemporánea de Alicante, 1998. «A Laura Negro»)	Orchestral music	13:00
1999	Opus 190	Divertimento, Op. 190 for saxophone quartet	Chamber music	
	-	orchestración de Eduardo Toldrá: Music for six Sonnets for violin and string orchestra	Orchestral music	
	-	Music for the movie La Espuela.	Cinema music	
	-	Music for the movie La petición.	Cinema music	
	-	Music for the movie Melodrama Infernal.	Cinema music	
	-	Music for the movie Vera, un Cuento Cruel.	Cinema music	
	-	Music for Ciclo Grifith (television).	Music for television	
	-	Music for Cine Mudo (television).	Music for television	
	-	Music for El Camino (television).	Music for television	
	-	Music for El Hada Rebeca (television).	Music for television	
	-	Music for Especial Charlie Rivel (television).	Music for television	
	-	Music for La Mocedad del Mío Cid (television).	Music for television	
	-	Music for La Mujer y el Deporte (television).	Music for television	
	-	Music for La Promesa (television).	Music for television	
	-	Music for La Prudente Venganza (television).	Music for television	
	-	Music for La Rama Seca (television).	Music for television	
	-	Music for Rosaura a las 10 (television).	Music for television	
	-	Music for Sombras Recobradas (television).	Music for television	
	-	Music for the theatrical work El Cómic Cómico Ruidoso de Don Roberto.	Theater music	
	-	Music for the theatrical work Motín de Brujas.	Theater music	
	-	Music for the theatrical work Ondina.	Theater music	
	-	Music for El Mosaico. (radio)		

(*) (f.c.) means outside or withdrawn from Catalogue.
