= Metamorphosis (1975 film) =

- Directed by: Barry Greenwald
- Written by: Barry Greenwald
- Produced by: Barry Greenwald
- Starring: Bob Green; Ali Kubik; Albert Williams
- Cinematography: John Westheuser
- Edited by: Barry Greenwald
- Distributed by: Canadian Filmmakers' Distribution Centre
- Release date: September 15, 1975 (Stratford)
- Running time: 10 minutes
- Country: Canada
- Language: English

Metamorphosis is a Canadian short comedy-drama film, directed by Barry Greenwald and released in 1975. A satirical parable about the rat race, the film centres on a man (Bob Green) who is bored with his daily routine, and decides one day to undress and dress himself again in the elevator on his way to work; successfully accomplishing the task, he sets greater challenges to accomplish during the nine-floor elevator ride, culminating in a day when he lives his entire life in the span of the trip and is dead by the time he reaches the ground floor.

Greenwald made the film as a student project while studying film at Conestoga College.

The film premiered in 1975 at the Stratford Film Festival. It was screened ten days later at Concordia University's Canadian Student Film Festival, where it received an honorable mention, and Greenwald won the Canadian Film Award for Best Sound Editing in a Non-Feature at the 26th Canadian Film Awards.

It was subsequently screened at the 1976 Cannes Film Festival, where it won the Short Film Palme d'Or.
