= Como México no hay dos =

- Directed by: Rafael Villaseñor Kuri
- Starring: Vicente Fernández; Blanca Guerra; Héctor Suárez; Roberto “Flaco” Guzmán; Carlos López Moctezuma; Amparo Muñoz; Maribel Guardia; Humberto Elizondo; Sara García
- Release date: 1980
- Running time: 107 minute
- Country: Mexico
- Language: Spanish

Como México no hay dos is a 1980 Mexican film. It stars Vicente Fernández.
