= Patxi Andión =

Spanish singer-songwriter (1947–2019)

- Born: 6 October 1947; Madrid, Spain
- Died: 18 December 2019 (aged 72); Cubo de la Solana, Soria, Spain
- Spouse: Amparo Munoz (1976–1983)
- Children: One, miscarried

Francisco "Patxi" Andión González (6 October 1947 – 18 December 2019) was a Spanish singer-songwriter, musician and actor.

== Biography ==
Patxi Andión was born to Basque parents in Madrid in 1947 and lived part of his childhood in the Basque town of Azpeitia. His political beliefs led him to seek exile in Paris, where he took part in the May 68 protests and where he subsequently embarked on his musical career.

Andion was previously married to the 23rd Miss Universe on 16 May 1976, of whom she had a miscarriage. Their divorce proceedings began in 1978 and was finalized according to the Constitution of Spain in 1983.

Andión died in a car accident in Cubo de la Solana in the Spanish province of Soria on 18 December 2019.

== Acting ==
=== Films ===
- El libro del Buen Amor (1975) (actor and composer). Co-directed by Julián Marcos and Tomás Aznar, based on the book of the same title by Arcipreste de Hita.
- La otra alcoba (1976) (actor and composer). Directed by Eloy de la Iglesia.
- Libertad provisional (1976) (actor and composer). Directed by Roberto Bodegas.
- Caperucita y roja (1977) (actor). Co-directed by Aitor Goirocelaya and Luis Revenga.
- Acto de posesión (1977) (actor). Directed by Javier Aguirre, based on the book "Dos madres" by Miguel de Unamuno.
- Asesinato en el Comité Central (1982) (actor). Directed by Vicente Aranda, based on the book of the same title by Manuel Vázquez Montalbán.
- Corazón de papel (1982) (actor). Directed by Roberto Bodegas.
- La rosa de los vientos (1983) (actor). Directed by Patricio Guzmán.
- Puzzle (1986) (actor). Directed by Lluis Josep Comerón.
- La estanquera de Vallecas (1986) (actor and composer). Directed by Eloy de la Iglesia.
- La sal de la vida (1995) (actor). Directed by Eugenio Martín

=== Television ===
- Las pícaras (1983) (actor in the episode "La pícara Justina"). Television series.
- Brigada Central (1989) (actor in an episode). Television series directed by Pedro Masó.
- Página de sucesos (1985) (actor). Television series directed by Antonio Gimenez Rico.
- La virtud del asesino (1997) (actor y scriptwriter). Directed by Roberto Bodegas, based on the book of the same name written by Patxi Andión himself.

== Discography ==
=== LPs ===
- Retratos (1969)
- Once canciones entre paréntesis (1971)
- Palabra por palabra (1972)
- Posiblemente (1972)
- A donde el agua (1973)
- José María Iparragirre Patxi Andion'en era (1973)
- Como el viento del norte (1974)
- El libro de buen amor (1975)
- Viaje de ida (1976)
- Cancionero prohibido (1978)
- Arquitectura (1979)
- Evita (musical) (1981)
- Amor primero (1983)
- El balcón abierto(1986)
- Nunca, nadie (1998)

=== Collaborations ===
- Poets in New York (Poetas en Nueva York) (contributor, Federico García Lorca tribute album, 1986; with the song "Oda a Walt Whitman")

=== Singles ===
- Vallekas (1987). The theme song of the movie "La estanquera de Vallecas", it was released as a promotional single on the compilation album Dial Discos. In 1998, Patxi recorded a new version of the song, this time not edited for radio, for the album Nunca, nadie.

== Books ==
- Canciones y otras palabras previas (Emiliano Escolar, 1980)
- Susan (todo está por vivir) (Nueva Politécnica, 1983)
- La virtud del asesino (Planeta, 1998)
- La caza racional (Universidad Politécnica de Castilla-La Mancha, 2003)
