= Memorias de un visitador médico =

- Directed by: Luis María Delgado
- Screenplay by: Luis María Delgado
- Starring: Andrés García; Amparo Muñoz; Helga Liné
- Release date: 1980
- Running time: 101 minutes
- Country: Mexico
- Language: Spanish

Memorias de un visitador médico (transl. Memoirs of a Visiting Physician: the Sexologist) is a 1980 film directed by Luis María Delgado. It stars Andrés García and Amparo Muñoz. The screenplay is based on a 1969 book by José de Lugo.

== Cast ==
- Andrés García as José de Lugo
- Amparo Muñoz as Magdalena
- Anaís de Melo as patient
- Helga Liné as Elvira Coro
