= Pascual Duarte =

1976 film

- Directed by: Ricardo Franco
- Written by: Camilo José Cela; Ricardo Franco; Emilio Martínez Lázaro; Elías Querejeta
- Starring: José Luis Gómez
- Cinematography: Luis Cuadrado
- Edited by: Pablo González del Amo
- Release date: 2 April 1976
- Running time: 94 minutes
- Country: Spain
- Language: Spanish

Pascual Duarte is a 1976 Spanish drama film directed by Ricardo Franco. It was entered into the 1976 Cannes Film Festival, where José Luis Gómez won the award for Best Actor. It is based on the novel The Family of Pascual Duarte by author Camilo José Cela.

== Cast ==
- José Luis Gómez as Pascual Duarte
- Diana Perez de Guzman
- Paca Ojea as Pascual's mother
- Héctor Alterio as Esteban Duarte Diniz
- Eduardo Calvo as Don Jesús
- Joaquín Hinojosa as Paco López, "El Estirao"
- Maribel Ferrero
- Eduardo Bea
- Francisco Casares
- Eugenio Navarro
- Carlos Oller
- José Luis Baringo
- Carmen León (as Carmen de León)
- Pedrín Fernández
- Salvador Muñoz Calvo as Pascual Duarte, as a boy
