= Gabriella Pallotta =

Italian actress (1938–2025)

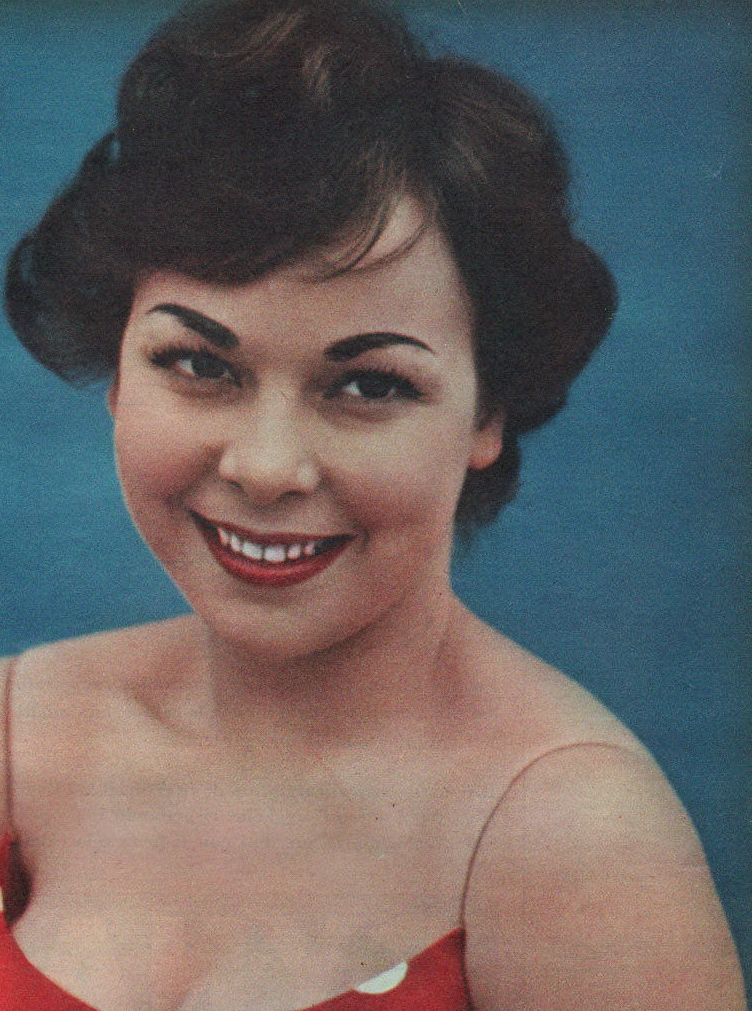
- Born: 6 October 1938; Rome, Italy
- Died: 25 May 2025 (aged 86); Viterbo, Italy
- Occupation: Actress
- Years active: 1956–1974

Gabriella Pallotta (6 October 1938 – 25 May 2025) was an Italian actress who appeared in 22 films between 1956 and 1974. For the film The Pigeon That Took Rome (1962) she was nominated for the Golden Globe Award for Best Supporting Actress – Motion Picture.

Pallotta died in Viterbo on 25 May 2025, at the age of 86.

== Filmography ==
| Year | Title | Role | Notes |
|---|---|---|---|
| 1956 | The Roof | Luisa Pilon | |
| 1957 | Il Grido | Edera, her sister | |
| 1957 | Doctor and the Healer | Pasqua | |
| 1958 | The Italians They Are Crazy | Anna | |
| 1958 | Anna of Brooklyn | Mariuccia | |
| 1958 | Valeria ragazza poco seria | Valeria | |
| 1958 | Maid, Thief and Guard | Adalgisa Pellicciotti | |
| 1959 | L'amico del giaguaro | | |
| 1959 | Devil's Cavaliers | Guiselle, Louise's Maid | |
| 1961 | The Lovemakers | Carmelinda | |
| 1961 | The Mongols | Lutezia | |
| 1961 | Madame | Héloïse | |
| 1962 | The Pigeon That Took Rome | Rosalba Massimo | |
| 1964 | Hero of Rome | Clelia | |
| 1966 | The Bible: In the Beginning... | Ham's Wife | |
| 1966 | Las viudas | Paula | (segment "El Retrato de Regino") |
| 1966 | In the Shadow of the Eagles | Julia | |
| 1967 | The Sailor from Gibraltar | Girl at Dance | |
| 1968 | The Seven Cervi Brothers | Irnes, Agostino's wife | |
| 1968 | Vedove inconsolabili in cerca di... distrazioni | | |
| 1974 | Playing the Field | Laura | |
| 1974 | Professore venga accompagnato dai suoi genitori | Teacher of Italian | |
| 1977 | Ride bene... chi ride ultimo | Maria | (segment "Sedotto e violentato") |
