= The Request =

- Theatrical release poster
- Spanish: La petición
- Directed by: Pilar Miró
- Screenplay by: Leo Anchóriz; Pilar Miró
- Based on: Pour une nuit d'amour by Émile Zola
- Starring: Ana Belén; Frédéric de Pasquale; Emilio Gutiérrez Caba
- Cinematography: Hans Burmann
- Edited by: Pablo del Amo
- Music by: Román Alís
- Production company: CIPI Cinematográfica
- Release dates: 20 September 1976 (Barcelona); 7 October 1976 (Madrid)
- Country: Spain
- Language: Spanish

The Request (Spanish: La petición) is a 1976 Spanish drama film directed by Pilar Miró (in her feature debut) and co-written by Leo Anchóriz based on Émile Zola's short story Pour une nuit d'amour. It stars Ana Belén along with Frédéric de Pasquale and Emilio Gutiérrez Caba.

== Plot ==
Set in northern Spain in the Spring of 1900, the plot follows Teresa, the single child of a wealthy conservative family. After Teresa's lover Miguel dies amid a violent act of sexual intercourse with her, she seeks help from the mute Julián to dispose of the body.

== Cast ==
- Ana Belén as Teresa
- Frédéric de Pasquale as Julián, "the Mute"
- Emilio Gutiérrez Caba as Miguel
- Manuel Sierra as Mauricio
- María Luisa Ponte as Francisca
- Eduardo Calvo as Teresa's father
- Mayrata O'Wisiedo as the mother
- Carmen Maura as the companion of the mute
- Félix Rotaeta as post office employee

== Production ==
The screenplay was written by Leo Anchóriz and Pilar Miró adapting the short story Pour une nuit d'amour by Émile Zola. The film is a CIPI Cinematográfica production. Shooting locations included the castle of Pedraza.

== Release ==
The film premiered in Barcelona on 20 September 1976, and in Madrid on 7 October 1976. It was also programmed at the Tehran International Film Festival.

== See also ==
- List of Spanish films of 1976
