= That Man from Tangier =

1953 film

- Directed by: Luis María Delgado; Robert Elwyn
- Written by: John Meehan Jr. Tíbor Reves
- Starring: Nils Asther; Roland Young; Nancy Coleman; Sara Montiel
- Cinematography: Don Malkames
- Edited by: Félix Suárez Inclán
- Music by: Elizabeth Firestone
- Production companies: Chamartín Producciones y Distribuciones; Elemsee Overseas Productions
- Distributed by: United Artists
- Release date: 8 May 1953
- Running time: 82 minutes
- Countries: Spain; United States
- Language: Spanish

That Man from Tangier (Spanish: Aquel hombre de Tánger) is a 1953 American-Spanish adventure film directed by Luis María Delgado and Robert Elwyn and starring Nils Asther, Roland Young and Nancy Coleman. It was the final film of the British actor Young.

== Plot ==
While on a trip to Europe, Mary Ellen gets drunk and marries a count she meets. Eager to get a divorce she follows him to the casbah in Tangier only to discover he is an impostor.

== Cast ==
- Nils Asther as Henri
- Roland Young as George
- Nancy Coleman as Mary Ellen
- Margaret Wycherly as Mrs. Sanders
- Sara Montiel as Aixa
- Fernando Aguirre
- Julia Caba Alba
- Gary Land
- Juana Mansó
- José María Mompín
- Matilde Muñoz Sampedro
- Emilio Santiago
- José Suarez

== Bibliography ==
- Kenneth Von Gunden. Flights of Fancy: The Great Fantasy Films. McFarland, 1989.
