= Luis María Delgado =

Spanish film director and screenwriter

- Born: 12 September 1926; Madrid, Castile, Spain
- Died: 11 July 2007 (aged 80); Celorio, Asturias, Spain
- Occupations: Director, writer
- Years active: 1942–2004 (film)

Luis María Delgado (1926–2007) was a Spanish film director and screenwriter. He was the son of the director Fernando Delgado.

== Selected filmography ==
- Love and Desire (1952)
- That Man from Tangier (1953)
- Manicomio (1954)
- La estrella del rey (1957)
- The Italians They Are Crazy (1958)
- Diferente (1961)
- Secuestro en la ciudad (1965)
- Mi marido y sus complejos (1969)
- Hamelín (1969)
- Mónica Stop (1969)
- Aventura en las islas Cíes (1972)
- Memorias de un visitador médico (1980)

== Bibliography ==
- Labanyi, Jo & Pavlović, Tatjana. A Companion to Spanish Cinema. John Wiley & Sons, 2012.
- Mira, Alberto. The Cinema of Spain and Portugal. Wallflower Press, 2005.
