= Spaniards in Paris =

1971 film

- Directed by: Roberto Bodegas
- Written by: José Luis Dibildos; Roberto Bodegas
- Produced by: José Luis Dibildos
- Starring: Laura Valenzuela
- Cinematography: Rafael de Casenave
- Release date: 26 April 1971
- Running time: 102 minutes
- Country: Spain
- Language: Spanish

Spaniards in Paris (Spanish: Españolas en París) is a 1971 Spanish drama film directed by Roberto Bodegas. It was entered into the 7th Moscow International Film Festival.

== Cast ==
- Laura Valenzuela as Emilia
- Ana Belén as Isabel
- Máximo Valverde as Manolo
- Tina Sáinz as Francisca
- Elena María Tejeiro as Dioni
- José Sacristán as Plácido
- Emma Cohen as Katy
- Simón Andreu as Director of Pompe Service
- Pierre Vernier as Monsieur Lemonier
- Françoise Arnoul as Madame Lemonier
- Teresa Rabal as Casilda
- Yelena Samarina as Madame Legrand
