= The Italians They Are Crazy =

- Directed by: Duilio Coletti; Luis María Delgado
- Written by: Duilio Coletti; Sandro Continenza; Ennio De Concini; Luis María Delgado; Miguel Martín; Giuseppe Scoponi; Luciano Vincenzoni
- Produced by: Artur Brauner; Evaristo Signorini
- Starring: Victor McLaglen; Folco Lulli; Gabriella Pallotta
- Cinematography: Antonio Macasoli; Gábor Pogány
- Edited by: Teresa Alcocer
- Music by: Manuel Parada; Nino Rota
- Production companies: Labor Films; Unión Films
- Distributed by: Delta Films
- Release date: 5 April 1958
- Running time: 106 minutes
- Countries: Italy; Germany
- Language: Italian

The Italians They Are Crazy (Italian: Gli italiani sono matti) is a 1958 Italian-German comedy film directed by Duilio Coletti and Luis María Delgado and starring Victor McLaglen, Folco Lulli and Gabriella Pallotta.

== Plot ==
Some Italian prisoners in a German POW camp bet with its commandant that they could build a church in two hours.

== Cast ==
- Victor McLaglen as Sergente O'Riley
- Folco Lulli as Don Bernardo
- Gabriella Pallotta as Anna
- Maurizio Arena as Benedetti
- José Suárez as Pieroni
- Luigi Pavese as Maggiore Masi
- Marianne Koch as Cristina
- Wolfgang Preiss as Hans
- Santiago Rivero as Maggiore O'Brien
- Memmo Carotenuto as Il biondino
- Raffaele Pisu as Altro Prigioniero Italiano
- José Vivó
- Mara Cruz
- Sergio Mendizábal
- Gerd Martienzen
- Sonja Ziemann
- Renato Terra
- Carlos De Moy
- Alfonso Godá
- José Jaspe

== Bibliography ==
- Parish, James Robert. Film Actors Guide. Scarecrow Press, 1977.
