= Giampiero Littera =

Italian actor (1938–2025)

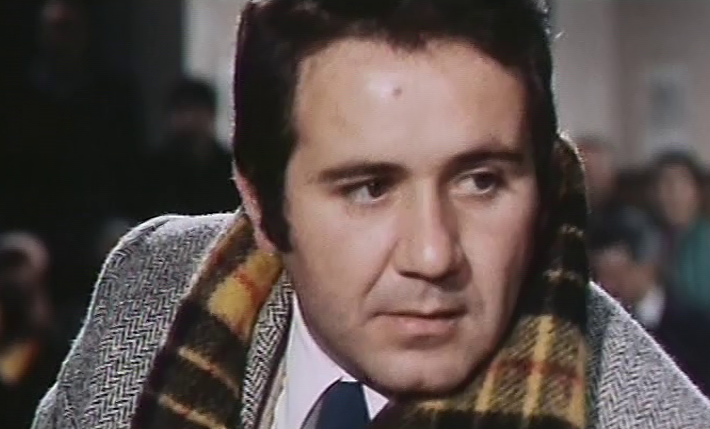
- Born: 25 June 1938; Rome, Italy
- Died: 6 July 2025 (aged 87); Rome, Italy
- Occupation: Actor

Giampiero Littera (25 June 1938 – 6 July 2025) was an Italian actor, knwon for his appearance on the Italian classic films of 1950s and 1960s.

== Life and career ==
Born in Rome, Littera, while still a teenager, made his film debut in Luciano Emmer's High School. Four years later, after completing his high school studies, he had his breakthrough role as Benito in Mario Camerini's Vacanze a Ischia. From then Littera appeared in numerous films, often cast in the role of the cheerful, loyal friend of the protagonist. In 1970 he played his last role and then he devoted himself to a career as an antique dealer.

Littera died on 6 July 2025, at the age of 87.

== Selected filmography ==
- Vacanze a Ischia (1957)
- Maid, Thief and Guard (1958)
- Legs of Gold (1958)
- Le signore (1960)
- The Joy of Living (1961)
- Eighteen in the Sun (1962)
- Shivers in Summer (1963)
- The Magnificent Adventurer (1963)
- Veneri al sole (1965)
- Two Mafiosi Against Goldfinger (1965)
- Golden Chameleon (1967)
- The Crazy Kids of the War (1967)
- Don Franco e Don Ciccio nell'anno della contestazione (1970)
