= Maid, Thief and Guard =

- Directed by: Steno
- Written by: Sandro Continenza; Lucio Fulci; Steno
- Starring: Gabriella Pallotta; Nino Manfredi; Fausto Cigliano
- Cinematography: Riccardo Pallottini
- Edited by: Gisa Radicchi Levi
- Music by: Lelio Luttazzi
- Release date: 1958
- Running time: 90 minutes
- Country: Italy
- Language: Italian

Maid, Thief and Guard (Italian: Guardia, ladro e cameriera, lit. 'Cop, Thief and Maid') is a 1958 Italian crime-comedy film co-written and directed by Steno.

== Plot ==
A poor man attempts to break in and steal on the night of New Year's Eve, putting a guard and a maid into trouble. In the end, everything works out for the best.

== Cast ==
- Gabriella Pallotta as Adalgisa Pellicciotti
- Nino Manfredi as Otello Cucchiaroni
- Fausto Cigliano as Amerigo Zappitelli
- Mario Carotenuto as the "Professor"
- Bice Valori as the Countess
- Luciano Salce as the Count
- Marco Guglielmi as Franco
- Salvo Libassi as Gioacchino
- Giampiero Littera as Angelino
- Enzo Garinei as the doctor

== Production ==
The film was one of the first productions of D.D.L., the production company founded by Totò together with his administrator Renato Libassi and Dino De Laurentiis' brother Alfredo. Principal cinematography started on 14 December 1957.

== Reception ==
The film was a moderate success, grossing 442 million lire.
