= The Magnificent Adventurer =

- Directed by: Riccardo Freda
- Screenplay by: Filippo Sanjust
- Story by: Filippo Sanjust; Riccardo Freda
- Produced by: Luigi Carpentieri; Ermanno Donati
- Starring: Brett Halsey; Claudia Mori; Françoise Fabian; Giampiuero Littera
- Cinematography: Julio Ortas; Raffaele Masciocchi
- Edited by: Ornella Micheli
- Music by: Francesco De Masi
- Production companies: Panda Cinematografica; Les Films du Centaure; Hispamer Films
- Distributed by: Regional
- Release date: 3 August 1963 (Italy)
- Countries: Italy; France; Spain
- Box office: ₤121 million

The Magnificent Adventurer (Italian: Il magnifico avventuriero) is a 1963 adventure film directed by Riccardo Freda. It is loosely based on real life events of Benvenuto Cellini.

== Cast ==
- Brett Halsey as Benvenuto Cellini
- Françoise Fabian as Lucrezia
- Claudia Mori as Piera
- Bernard Blier as Papa Clemente VII
- Rossella Como as Angela
- Félix Dafauce as conte Frangipani
- José Nieto as Connestabile di Borbone
- Jacinto San Emeterio as Francisco I
- Elio Pandolfi as attore
- Andrea Bosic as Michelangelo
- Diego Michelotti as Carlo V
- Umberto D'Orsi as granduca di Toscana
- Carla Calò as zia di Angela
- Sandro Dori as zio di Angela
- Giampiero Littera as Francesco
- Dany París as moglie di Francesco

== Production ==
The Magnificent Adventurer was director Riccardo Freda's last film for Panda Cinematografica. It was based on the real-life character of Benvenuto Cellini, a sculptor, goldsmith, draftsman, soldier and musician. A memoir of his life gained huge popularity during the 19th century which became the inspiration for other famous writers such as Alexandre Dumas. Freda was fascinated by Cellini, declaring him Cellini has "always been a model of independence for me. However, he was more of a great brigand than a great artist." The script does follow Cellini's memoirs, and places him in an imaginary scenario.

The Magnificent Adventurer was shot under the title Le avventure di Benvenuto Cellini between March and April 1963 in Rome at Castle Sant'Angelo, Castle d'Ostia, and at the De Paolis Studios.

== Release ==
The Magnificent Adventurer was released in Italy on August 3, 1963 where it was distributed by Regional. It grossed 121 million lire in Italy which film historian and critic Roberto Curti described as "nondescript". The film was released as Laventurier magnifigue (L'Aigle de Florence) and was purchased by American International Pictures for distribution to television as The Magnificent Adventurer. It was also released under the title The Burning of Rome.

== Reception ==
A contemporary review in the Monthly Film Bulletin described the film as "more serious and sober than much of Freda's other recent work, and his admirers may be a little disappointed at the often lethargic and lackluster result, which is quite inferior to the very similar Seventh Sword for instance."

Richard Roud referred to the film as "a constant pleasure to the eye" and "a glittering riot of delicate colour shadings in both sets and costumes".
