= The Pigeon That Took Rome =

1962 film by Melville Shavelson

- Original film poster
- Directed by: Melville Shavelson
- Written by: Donald Downes (novel); Melville Shavelson (screenplay)
- Produced by: Melville Shavelson
- Starring: Charlton Heston; Elsa Martinelli
- Cinematography: Daniel L. Fapp
- Edited by: Frank Bracht
- Music by: Alessandro Cicognini
- Distributed by: Paramount Pictures
- Release date: June 20, 1962
- Running time: 103 mins.
- Country: United States
- Language: English
- Box office: $2 million (US/Canada)

The Pigeon That Took Rome is a 1962 American comedy war film directed and written by Melville Shavelson and starring Charlton Heston. The film is set in the Italian Campaign of World War II and was based on the 1961 novel The Easter Dinner by former spy Donald Downes.

== Plot ==
In 1944, during the last stages of the war in Europe, American officers Paul MacDougall (Heston) and Joseph Angelico (Guardino) are sent to Rome to act as spies for the Allies, even though they have no experience in espionage. Working with Italian partisan soldier Ciccio Massimo (Baccaloni), MacDougall and Contini send regular reports to their superiors by carrier pigeon.

Angelico also finds himself falling in love with Massimo's pregnant daughter Rosalba (Pallotta), while her sister Antonella (Martinelli) has her eye on MacDougall. Angelico proposes to Rosalba, and Ciccio prepares a feast to celebrate his daughter's upcoming wedding. However, Ciccio prepares squab for the occasion, killing all but one of the carrier pigeons. Ciccio scrambles to replace them, but the new pigeons he finds are German, and they deliver MacDougall's and Angelico's messages directly into enemy hands, creating new confusion.

== Cast ==
- Charlton Heston - Captain Paul MacDougall, Benny the Snatch and Narrator
- Elsa Martinelli - Antonella Massimo
- Harry Guardino - Sgt. Joseph Angelico
- Salvatore Baccaloni - Ciccio Massimo
- Carlo Angeletti ("Marietto") - Livio Massimo
- Gabriella Pallotta - Rosalba Massimo
- Brian Donlevy - Col. Sherman Harrington
- Arthur Shields - Monsignor O'Toole
- Rudolph Anders - Col. Wilhelm Krafft
- Vadim Wolkowsky - Conte Danesi

== Awards and nominations ==
Academy Awards

- Best Art Direction-Set Decoration, Black-and-White (Hal Pereira, Roland Anderson, Samuel M. Comer, Frank R. McKelvy) (nominated)

Golden Globe Awards

- Best Motion Picture Actor - Musical/Comedy (Charlton Heston, nominated)
- Best Supporting Actor (Harry Guardino, nominated)
- Best Supporting Actress (Gabriella Pallotta, nominated)

Writers Guild of America

- Best Written American Comedy (Melville Shavelson, nominated)

== See also ==
- List of American films of 1962
- War pigeon
