= Barry Greenwald =

Canadian documentary filmmaker

Barry Greenwald (born 1954) is a Canadian documentary filmmaker, and co-founder of the Canadian Independent Film Caucus. While in his final year as a student at Conestoga College, he directed the 1975 film Metamorphosis, inspired by Czech documentary filmmaker Vaclav Taborsky, which won the Short Film Palme d'Or at the Cannes Film Festival. Upon graduation, he worked with the National Film Board of Canada (NFB) as a film editor, before directing documentary films independently.

Greenwald's films include the 1990 one-hour documentary Between Two Worlds, about Inuit Joseph Idlout. Produced by the NFB and Investigative Productions Inc., the film is included in the 2011 Inuit film collection, Unikkausivut: Sharing Our Stories.
