= Ana and the Wolves =

- Theatrical release poster
- Spanish: Ana y los lobos
- Directed by: Carlos Saura
- Screenplay by: Rafael Azcona; Carlos Saura
- Produced by: Elías Querejeta
- Starring: Geraldine Chaplin; Fernando F. Gómez; Rafaela Aparicio; José María Prada; José Vivó; Charo Soriano
- Cinematography: Luis Cuadrado
- Edited by: Pablo González del Amo
- Music by: Luis de Pablo
- Release date: 16 July 1973
- Running time: 102 minutes
- Country: Spain
- Language: Spanish

Ana and the Wolves (Spanish: Ana y los lobos) is a 1973 Spanish absurdist comedy-drama film directed by Carlos Saura and co-written by Rafael Azcona. It stars Geraldine Chaplin as a foreign governess who comes to an isolated house to take care of the children of a twisted family. The film is encoded with political symbolism of Francoist Spain. It was entered into the 1973 Cannes Film Festival.

== Plot ==
Ana, a young foreign governess, arrives at an isolated country estate in the arid region of Castile, near Madrid. She has come to look after three little girls whose mother, Luchy, greets her upon arrival. While Ana is unpacking, José, an uncle of the girls, introduces himself as the voice of order and authority in the family. If Ana runs into any problems she must go to him, he explains.

A family dinner that evening gives Ana the chance to get to know her eccentric employers. The family consists of three middle age brothers (José, Juan and Fernando), their ailing mother, Juan's wife Luchy, and the couple's three daughters: Carlota, Victoria and Natalia. At night, Natalia wakes up screaming after a nightmare. Juan, the father of the three girls, lusting after Ana, takes advantage of the situation to enter her bedroom. Firmly but politely, she rejects his sexual advances. Dominated by an uncontrollable sex drive, the rejected Juan looks for consolation with Amparo, one of the maids.

Ana starts receiving erotic letters signed by a secret admirer who desires to be with her. They are delivered with unusual postage stamps from distant places, each place closer than the last one. José explains to Ana that he has not only opened and read the letters, but that he knows who has been sending them. Juan, he tells her, has been writing them using the family's valuable collection of stamps to deceive her. José has set up a small museum of military outfits in his study and he offers Ana his protection and a small payment if she takes care of the uniforms.

Fernando, the most subdued of the three brothers, has moved out of the main house to establish his residence in a nearby cave where he practices mystical incantations in an effort to levitate. Fernando intrigues Ana the most. She is both appalled by him and attracted to his way of life, as if understanding why he wants to escape from the world.

Between bouts of epilepsy and gout, the ailing matriarch, Mama, remains the protectress of the family unit. When she and Ana engage in direct dialogue, the old dowager gives Ana a bit of the background about the three sons while showing the governess their childhood clothing, which she has saved for years. "You must be understanding with them," Mama tells her. The absurdity of this strange family intrigues Ana all the more.

Ana now actively leads the three brothers on, playing along with the fantasy life of each of one, sometimes outwardly mocking them. Recruited to help José with his museum when he shoots a flying bird to scare her, Ana is bemused and gives him a medal as a reward.

Juan is so obsessed with Ana that at one point he sneaks into her bedroom to brush his teeth with her toothbrush. She is perplexed by his antics. To embarrass him she makes him open one of the letters and read it out loud. Later on, she kisses him and asks him if he is willing to leave his wife for her. When he says yes, she frightens him by calling his wife.

Only with Fernando does Ana develop a more intimate (although still Platonic) relationship. The entire family goes to see Fernando at his cave. They are worried because he has refused to eat. Jose forces some food into his mouth, which Ana later takes out, realizing that he has not swallowed it. Looking for a missing doll, the three girls finally find it buried in mud with its hair cut off. The girls blame the wolves. Ana reports the incident to Juan, who explains that Fernando, who has a fetish for hair, is the culprit.

Ana's presence has become so disturbing in the house that Luchy, Juan's wife, wants to kill herself. When it becomes apparent that Ana has been leading her sons on by sowing doubts in their minds and endangering the unity of the family, Mama orders that she be dismissed. The three brothers waylay her on the road as she leaves the estate. All three assault her: forcing her to the ground, Fernando cuts off her hair; Juan rapes her; and José puts a pistol to her head and shoots her. The final freeze-frame is of Ana's agonized face in a gruesome close-up.

== Cast ==
- Geraldine Chaplin as Ana
- Fernando Fernán Gómez as Fernando
- José María Prada as José
- José Vivó as Juan
- Rafaela Aparicio as la madre ('the mother')
- Charo Soriano as Luchy
- Marisa Porcel as Amparo
- Nuria Lage as Natalia
- María José Puerta as Carlota
- Sara Gil as Victoria

== Production ==
Ana and the Wolves was filmed on the historic estate of El pendolero in the municipality of Torrelodones.

== Release ==
The film was released theatrically in Seville on 4 June 1973, in Barcelona on 8 June 1973, and in Madrid on 16 July 1973.

The film is available in Region 2 DVD.

== Critical reception ==
Lorenzo López Sancho of ABC declared Ana and the Wolves an "outstanding" film, describing it as "a cruel tale, an allegory rooted in Spanish reality".

== Awards ==
At the 29th CEC Awards held in 1974, the film was won the awards for Best Actor, Best Supporting Actress and Best Photography.
