= Frédéric de Pasquale =

French actor

- Born: 28 March 1931; Paris, France
- Died: 17 December 2001 (aged 70); Rouen, France
- Occupation: Actor
- Years active: 1960–2001

Frédéric de Pasquale (28 March 1931 – 17 December 2001) was a French actor. He appeared in 50 films and television shows between 1960 and 2001.

== Partial filmography ==
- Tourments (1954)
- The Girl with the Golden Eyes (1961) – Willy (uncredited)
- La Belle Vie (1963) – Frédéric Simon
- La Famille Hernandez (1965) – Lagache
- Diamond Safari (1966) – Le routier
- Fleur d'oseille (1967) – Pierrot la veine
- Le Viol (1967) – Henri Séverin
- Ne jouez pas avec les Martiens (1967) – Job
- Le pacha (1968) – Alfred
- Tu seras terriblement gentille (1968) – Patrice Verly
- Delphine (1969) – Jean Portal
- Jeff (1969) – Diamant
- Time to Live (1969) – Louis
- Children of Mata Hari (1970) – Nicolas Baslier Krestowitz
- The Hideout (1971) – Paolo
- Ciel bleu (1971)
- The French Connection (1971) – Henri Devereaux
- The Rebels (Quelques arpents de neige) (1972) – Victor
- Quem é Beta? (1972)
- Le fils (1973) – Baptiste
- Happy New Year (1973) – L'amant parisien
- Revolver (1973) – Michel Granier
- Los pájaros de Baden-Baden (1975) – Pablo
- Il soldato di ventura (1976)
- La petición (1976) – Julian
- Certaines nouvelles (1980) – Jean
- La Boum (1980) – Antoine
- Signé Furax (1981) – Le chef CRS
- Feroz (1984) – Andrés
- Le Loup de la côte Ouest (2002)
