= José Luis Gómez (actor) =

Spanish actor (born 1940)

The Most Excellent José Luis Gómez García
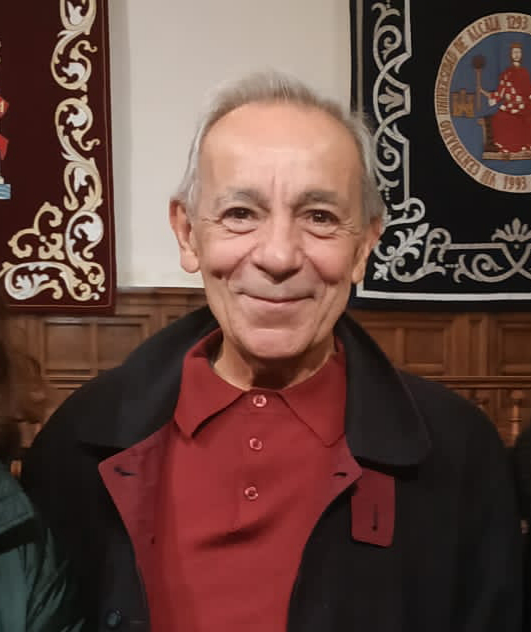
- Born: 19 April 1940 (age 86); Huelva, Spain
- Occupations: Actor and director
- Years active: 1968–present

Seat Z of the Real Academia Española
- Incumbent
- Assumed office 26 January 2014 (Note: Elected on 1 December 2011)
- Preceded by: Francisco Ayala

José Luis Gómez García (born 19 April 1940) is a Spanish film actor and director. He has appeared in 33 films since 1968. At the 1976 Cannes Film Festival, he won the award for Best Actor in the film Pascual Duarte. Gómez was elected to Seat Z of the Real Academia Española on 1 December 2011; he took up his seat on 26 January 2014.

== Selected filmography ==
- Pascual Duarte (1976)
- In Memoriam (1977)
- Blindfolded Eyes (1978)
- Dedicatoria (1980)
- Rowing with the Wind (1988)
- Lights and Shadows (1988)
- Prince of Shadows (1991)
- The End of a Mystery (2003)
- Goya's Ghosts (2006)
- Los Abrazos Rotos (2009)
- The Skin I Live In (2011)
- El Mudo (2013)
