= Cubo de la Solana =

- Municipality
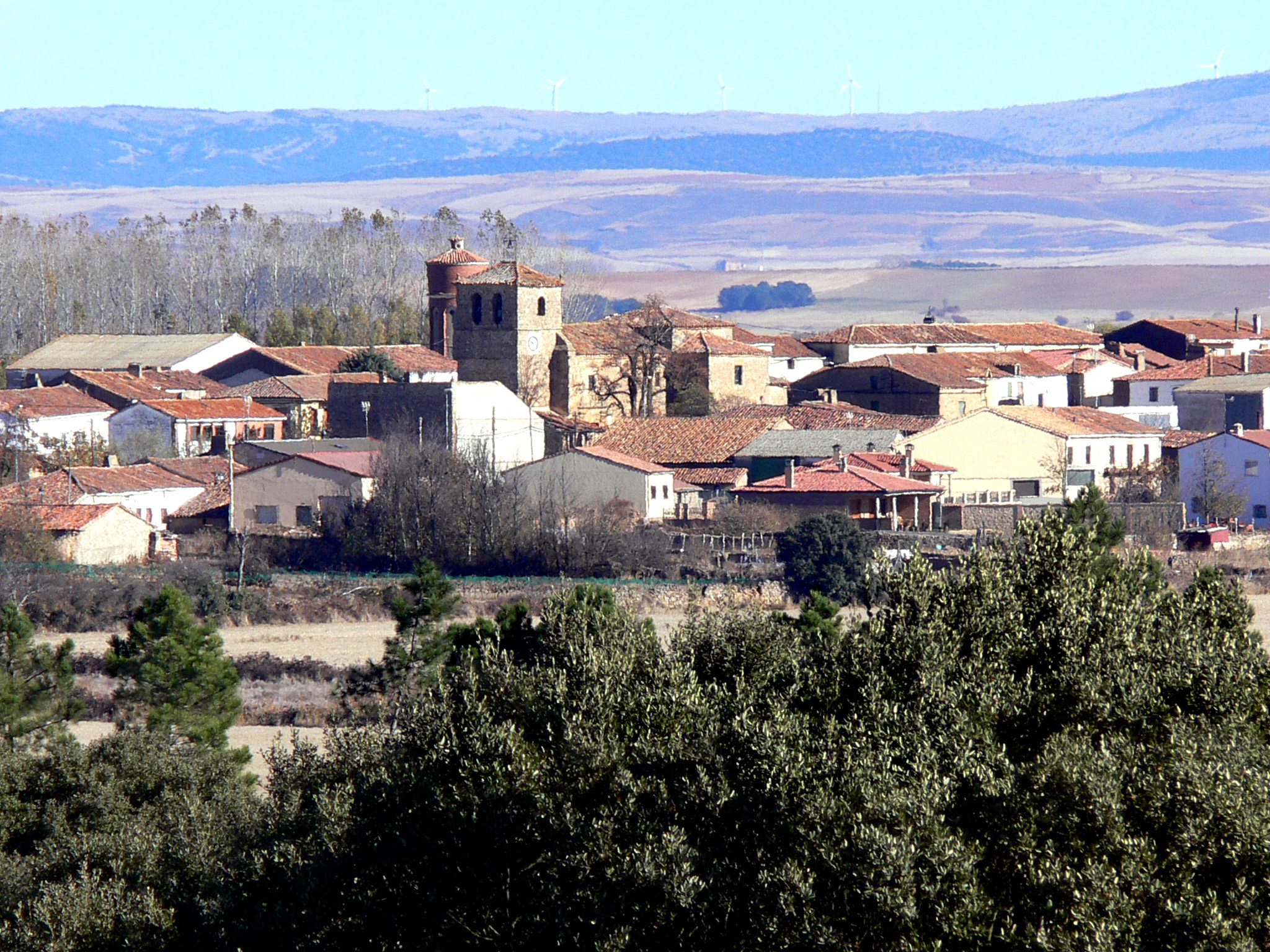
- Cubo de la Solana, a typical Soria agricultural town.

- Coat of arms

- Location in Spain. Cubo de la Solana (Spain)
- Country: Spain
- Autonomous community: Castile and León
- Province: Soria
- Municipality: Cubo de la Solana

Area
  - Total: 132.84 km^{2} (51.29 sq mi)
- Elevation: 992 m (3,255 ft)

Population (2025-01-01)
  - Total: 177
  - Density: 1.33/km^{2} (3.45/sq mi)
- Time zone: UTC+1 (CET)
  - Summer (DST): UTC+2 (CEST)
- Website: Official website

Cubo de la Solana is a municipality located in the province of Soria, Castile and León, Spain. According to the 2004 census (INE), the municipality has a population of 229 inhabitants.
