= Juan Madrid =

Spanish writer

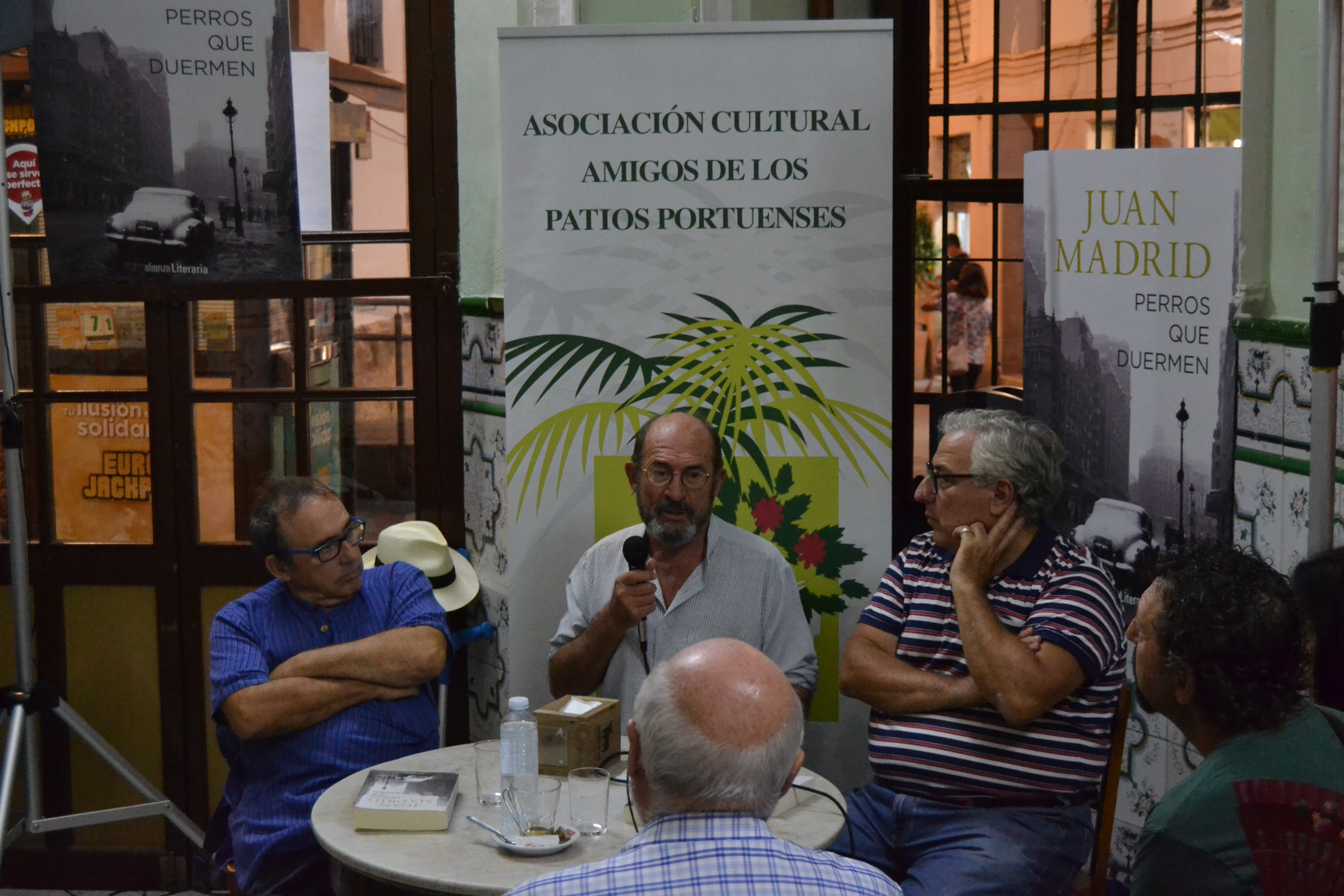
Juan Madrid (center)

Juan Madrid (born 1947, in Málaga) is a Spanish writer, journalist and script writer.

== Biography ==
He studied in Madrid and gained a degree in Contemporary History from the University of Salamanca. He has written for Cambio 16 since 1974, and this is where he currently works as an investigative reporter. He has written novels, chronicles, tales, short stories, youth novels and scripts for comics, films and TV. He admits to having started writing whilst preparing propaganda leaflets for the Spanish Communist Party, an activity that was illegal at the time.

He became recognised as a noir novelist after the publication of the collection Círculo del Crimen (SEDEMAY Editions), and became finalist of this collection's prize in 1980. In the same year he also published his first novel, Un beso de amigo (A Friend's Kiss), featuring the fictional character Toni Romano for the first time. Romano is the main character, a skeptical former policeman, boxer and debt collector, archetypchal of the Chandlerian detective in the Madrid of the Transition.

Madrid faithfully follows the rules of the traditional noir novel, mainly focusing on the social aspects of the time he describes, not always peaceful, with its flagrant contradictions and characters sometimes bordering marginality. The crumbling of values, power corruption and greed, and the circles of influence are commonplace in his novels.

Some of his works have been made into films (Días Contados, Tánger).

== Bibliography ==
=== Novels ===
- Un beso de amigo (1980)
- Las apariencias no engañan (1982)
- Nada que hacer (1984)
- Regalo de la casa (1986)
- Un trabajo fácil (1985)
- Días contados (1993)
- Brigada Central, (13 novels)
- Cuentas pendientes (1995)
- Malos tiempos (1995)
- Tánger (1997)
- Restos de carmín (1999)
- Gente bastante extraña (2001)
- Grupo de noche (2003)
- Pájaro en mano (2007)
- Adios, princesa (2008)

=== Tales ===
- Hotel Paraíso (1987)
- Jungla (1988)
- Oídos sordos (1990)
- La mirada
- Crónicas del Madrid oscuro (1994)

=== Youth Literature ===
- Cuartos oscuros (1993)
- Los cañones de Durango (1996)
- Los piratas del Ranghum (1996)
- En el mar de China (1997)
- El fugitivo de Borneo (1998)
- Los Senderos del Tigre (2005)

=== Scripts ===
- TV Series Brigada Central

=== Other ===
- Mujeres & mujeres (1996, short story)
- La mano negra (1998, essay)
- Viaje por el Amazonas (documentary)
