= Máximo Valverde =

Spanish actor (born 1944)

- Born: Máximo Carlos González-Valderde Hortal; 16 November 1944 (age 81); Seville, Spain
- Occupations: Actor and producer
- Years active: 1968–present

Máximo Valverde (born 16 November 1944) is a Spanish actor. He appeared in more than sixty films since 1968.

== Selected filmography ==
- 1970: The Wind's Fierce
- 1971: Una chica casi decente
- 1971: The Rebellious Novice
- 1971: Spaniards in Paris
- 1972: Tragic Ceremony as Joe
- 1973: No es bueno que el hombre esté solo as Mauro
- 1975: Clara is the Price
- 1977: Hotel Fear
- 1978: Bermuda: Cave of the Sharks
- 1984: The Cheerful Colsada Girls as Juan Luis
