= Elías Querejeta =

Spanish screenwriter and film producer

- Born: Elías Querejeta Gárate; 27 October 1934; Hernani (Gipuzkoa), Spain
- Died: 9 June 2013 (aged 78); Madrid, Spain
- Spouse: Maria Carmen Marín
- Partner: Amparo Muñoz
- Children: Gracia Querejeta

Elías Querejeta
Personal information
- Position: Midfielder

Senior career*
Years	Team	Apps	(Gls)
1952–1953	Real Sociedad	2	(0)
1953–1955	SD Eibar	20	(2)
1955–1958	Real Sociedad	34	(5)
1958–1959	Alavés	19	(4)
Total		75	(11)
- * Club domestic league appearances and goals

Elías Querejeta Gárate (Note: In this Spanish name, the first or paternal surname is Querejeta and the second or maternal family name is Gárate.) (27 October 1934 – 9 June 2013), also known as Elías Querejeta (Spanish pronunciation: [eˈli.as keɾeˈxeta]) and known in the Spanish film industry as "The Producer", was a Spanish screenwriter and film producer. He is the father of Gracia Querejeta.

== Biography ==
Querejeta was born in Hernani, Spain, and played soccer for Real Sociedad. By the age of 18 he was making his debut in the Spanish first division with San Sebastián's team, Real Sociedad (his position was midfielder; his brother José María also played, as a goalkeeper). But his career in sports ended in 1959, when he moved to Madrid to set up his own film production company.

He produced some of the best-known Spanish films of the 1960s and 1970s and most notably worked with Carlos Saura (13 films), Víctor Erice (2 films), Montxo Armendáriz (4 times) and Fernando León de Aranoa (3 films).

He produced Mr. Saura's La Prima Angélica (1973) and Cría Cuervos (1975), which won special jury prizes at the 1973 and 1975 at the special prize of the jury at the Cannes Film Festival, and Mama Turns 100 (1979), which was nominated for the Academy Award for Best Foreign Language Film at the 52nd Academy Awards. "Mama Turns 100" was a sequel to Mr. Saura's Ana and the Wolves (1973), which Mr. Querejeta also produced.

Querejeta gave wings to the careers of directors such as Carlos Saura, Jaime Chávarri, Emilio Martínez Lázaro, Fernando León de Aranoa, Víctor Erice and his own daughter, Gracia Querejeta.

== Personal life ==
The most significant relationship of Querejeta's life was with Amparo Muñoz. He met Amparo on the set of Mamá cumple cien años. The relationship subsequently received much publicity. Querejeta remained married throughout their relationship; although he and his wife, Maria Carmen y Marin had been living separate lives, there was never an official split and neither party pursued a divorce. Muñoz did not interfere, and never fought for marriage, until her death in 2011. Querejeta later died in 2013 in Madrid, Spain (aged 78).
