= José Vivó =

Spanish actor (1917–1989)

- Born: José Vivó Costa; 19 May 1917; Barcelona, Spain
- Died: 26 July 1989 (aged 72); Barcelona
- Occupation: Actor
- Years active: 1945–1989

José Vivó (19 May 1917 – 26 July 1989) was a Spanish television, theater and film actor.

== Life ==
He studied engineering, but the Spanish Civil War forced him to leave his studies unfinished. He fought on the side of the Republican army and at the end of the conflict, he devoted himself fully to the world of acting. His career began in the theater in 1946. In 1950 he moved to Madrid where he remained for the rest of his professional life.

Among his most notable films are: Bienvenido Mister Marshall (1953), La venganza de Don Mendo (1961), Las Ibéricas F.C. (1971), Ana y los lobos (1973), Las largas vacaciones del 36 (1976), Mamá cumple cien años (1979), El crimen de Cuenca (1980), Asesinato en el Comité Central (1982), El Sur (1983), El caballero del dragón (1985) and El Lute (camina o revienta) (1987).

He also worked extensible on the theater, but it was for his appearances in television where he became best known. He began his career on TV since the start of this medium in Spain in the 1950s, taking part in a great number of programs until shortly before his death.

== Partial filmography ==
- Costa Brava (1946)
- La casa de las sonrisas (1948) - Julio
- Doce horas de vida (1949) - Luis
- Tiempos felices (1950)
- Saturday Night (1950)
- La trinca del aire (1951)
- Welcome Mr. Marshall! (1953) - Secretario
- The Italians They Are Crazy (1958)
- Don Mendo's Revenche (1962) - Marqués de la Moncada
- Las nenas del mini-mini (1969) - Padre de Mao
- El certificado (1970) - Consul de Venezuela
- Las ibéricas F.C. (1971) - Entrenador del equipo contrario
- Las melancólicas (1971) - Doctor
- The Scarlet Letter (1973)
- Flor de santidad (1973) - Cardenal
- Ana and the Wolves (1973) - Juan
- Cebo para una adolescente (1974) - Antonio
- Vida conyugal sana (1974) - Gutiérrez
- El chulo (1974)
- Vera, un cuento cruel (1974) - Notario (Don Carlos)
- Sex o no sex (1974) - Psicoanalista
- Doctor, me gustan las mujeres, ¿es grave? (1974) - Don Joaquín
- El asesino no está solo (1975) - Raimundo
- El vicio y la virtud (1975) - Lozano
- Madrid, Costa Fleming (1976) - Iturriaga
- Long Vacations of 36 (1976) - Alberto
- Cuando los maridos se iban a la guerra (1976) - Físico
- La ciutat cremada (1976) - Doctor Robert
- Volvoreta (1976) - Preco
- El segundo poder (1976) - Hornachuelos
- El hombre que supo amar (1977) - Don Luis
- El puente (1977) - (uncredited)
- El perro (1977) - Sebastián
- El último guateque (1978) - (uncredited)
- El sacerdote (1978) - Obispo
- Cabo de vara (1978)
- Traffic Jam (1979) - Mercedes passenger
- El día del presidente (1979) - Ministro de Sanidad
- Mama Turns 100 (1979) - Juan
- El buscón (1979) - Alonso
- The Crime of Cuenca (1980) - Don Rufo
- Los fieles sirvientes (1980) - Álvarez
- La plaça del Diamant (1982) - Mossèn Vivó
- Asesinato en el Comité Central (1982) - Fonseca
- La colmena (1982) - Prestamista
- Femenino singular (1982) - Padre de Luisa
- El Sur (1983) - Camarero
- Panic Beats (1983) - Dr. Rigaud
- La bestia y la espada mágica (1983) - Liutprando de Cremona
- La mujer del juez (1984) - Padre de Paz / Paz's father
- El jardín secreto (1984) - (uncredited)
- Mon ami Washington (1984)
- Padre nuestro (1985) - Papa
- Luces de bohemia (1985) - Zaratustra
- Caso cerrado (1985) - Director de la prisión
- The Knight of the Dragon (1985) - Count of Rue
- La noche de la ira (1986) - Matías
- El hermano bastardo de Dios (1986)
- Policía (1987) - Narcotraficante
- La guerra de los locos (1987)
- El Lute: Run for Your Life (1987) - Ministro
- Jarrapellejos (1988) - Conde
- La diputada (1988) - Solana
- Diario de invierno (1988)
- La punyalada (1990) - Avi
