= Roberto Bodegas =

Spanish film director and screenwriter (1933–2019)

- Born: 3 June 1933; Madrid, Spain
- Died: 2 August 2019 (aged 86)
- Occupations: Film director, screenwriter
- Years active: 1960–2019

Roberto Bodegas (3 June 1933 – 2 August 2019) was a Spanish film director and screenwriter. He has directed 15 films since 1971. His 1971 film Spaniards in Paris was entered into the 7th Moscow International Film Festival.

== Selected filmography ==
- Spaniards in Paris (1971)
- Seven Days in January (1979)

== Awards and recognition ==
Bodegas won the Best Screenplay category in the 1974 National Syndicate of Spectacle, Spain for his film Los nuevos españoles (The New Spaniards). This was award was shared with his co-writers José Luis Dibildos and José Luis Garci.
