= List of Spanish films of 1987 =

A list of Spanish-produced and co-produced feature films released in Spain in 1987.

== Films ==
| Release | | Title (Domestic title) | Cast & Crew | Ref. |
|---|---|---|---|---|
| J A N U A R Y | 20 | Turnip Top (Cara de acelga) | Director: José Sacristán Cast: José Sacristán, Fernando Fernán Gómez, Marisa Paredes, Amparo Soler Leal | |
| F E B R U A R Y | 7 | Law of Desire (La ley del deseo) | Director: Pedro Almodóvar Cast: Carmen Maura, Antonio Banderas, Eusebio Poncela, Manuela Velasco | |
| M A R H | 5 | Los invitados | Director: Víctor Barrera Cast: Amparo Muñoz, Pablo Carbonell, Raúl Fraire, Lola Flores | |
| M A R H | 16 | Caín | Director: Manuel Iborra Cast: Verónica Forqué, Antonio Resines | |
| M A R H | 18 | Madrid | Director: Basilio Martín Patino Cast: Rüdiger Vogler, Verónica Forqué | |
| M A R H | 23 | Anguish (Angustia) | Director: Bigas Luna Cast: Zelda Rubinstein, Michael Lerner | |
| A P R I L | 3 | The House of Bernarda Alba (La casa de Bernarda Alba) | Director: Mario Camus Cast: Irene Gutiérrez Caba, Florinda Chico, Enriqueta Carballeira, Victoria Peña, Aurora Pastor, Mercedes Lezcano, Ana Belén | |
| A P R I L | 14 | La vida alegre | Director: Fernando Colomo Cast: Verónica Forqué, Antonio Resines, Ana Obregón, Guillermo Montesinos, Massiel, Miguel Rellán | |
| A P R I L | 23 | Course Completed (Asignatura aprobada) | Director: José Luis Garci Cast: Jesús Puente, Victoria Vera, Teresa Gimpera, Eduardo Hoyo | |
| M A Y | 29 | Wolves' Moon (Luna de lobos) | Director: Julio Sánchez Valdés Cast: Santiago Ramos, Antonio Resines, Álvaro de Luna, Kiti Mánver, Fernando Vivanco | |
| J U N E | 15 | Sufre mamón | Director: Manuel Summers Cast: Marta Madruga, Gerardo Ortega, Curro M. Summers, Antonio Gamero, Tomás Zori, Luis Escobar, David Summers, Javier Molina, Daniel Mezquita, Rafael Gutiérrez | |
| S E P T E M B E R | 15 | Divine Words (Divinas palabras) | Director: José Luis García Sánchez Cast: Ana Belén, Francisco Rabal, Imanol Arias, Esperanza Roy, Aurora Bautista, Juan Echanove | |
| O C T O B E R | 2 | The Enchanted Forest (El bosque animado) | Director: José Luis Cuerda Cast: Alfredo Landa, Encarna Paso, Fernando Valverde, Alejandra Grepi, Miguel Rellán, Alicia Hermida, Amparo Baró, María Isbert, Luma Gómez, Laura Cisneros, José Esteban Jr, Fernando Rey | |
| O C T O B E R | 6 | Uptown (Barrios altos) | Director: José Luis García Berlanga Cast: Victoria Abril, Juanjo Puigcorbé, Carmen Conesa, Lorenzo Santamaría | |
| O C T O B E R | 9 | El Lute: Run for Your Life (El Lute: camina o revienta) | Director: Vicente Aranda Cast: Imanol Arias, Victoria Abril, Antonio Valero, Carlos Tristancho, Diana Peñalver, Margarita Calahorra, José Cerro, Manuel de Blas, José Manuel Cervino | |
| O C T O B E R | 28 | Moors and Christians (Moros y cristianos) | Director: Luis García Berlanga Cast: Fernando Fernán Gómez, Verónica Forqué, Agustín González, Chus Lampreave, José L. López Vázquez, Andrés Pajares, M.ª Luisa Ponte, Antonio Resines, Pedro Ruiz, Rosa M.ª Sardá | |

== See also ==
- 2nd Goya Awards
