= List of Spanish films of 1974 =

A list of films produced in Spain in 1974 (see 1974 in film).

== 1974 ==
| Title | Director | Cast | Genre | Notes | Ref. |
|---|---|---|---|---|---|
1974
| Caudillo | Basilio Martín Patino | | Documentary | About Francisco Franco | |
| Clara es el Precio | Vicente Aranda | Amparo Muñoz, José Luis Galiardo, Máximo Valverde | Drama | | |
| Dick Turpin | Fernando Merino | Cihangir Ghaffari, Sancho Gracia, Manuel Zarzo | Adventure, Historical | | |
| The Ghost Frigate | | | Horror | | |
| La prima Angélica (Cousin Angelica) | Carlos Saura | José Luis López Vázquez, Lina Canalejas, Lola Cardona, Encarna Paso | Drama | Entered into the 1974 Cannes Film Festival; it had troubles with censorship | |
| Let Sleeping Corpses Lie | Jorge Grau | Cristina Galbo, Ray Lovelock | Horror | Co-produced with Italy | |
| The Love of Captain Brando | Jaime de Armiñán | | | Entered into the 24th Berlin International Film Festival | |
| Tamaño natural or Grandeur nature | Luis García Berlanga | Michel Piccoli, Amparo Soler Leal | Erotic | Filmed in Berlin, spoken in German | |
| Tormento (Torment) | Pedro Olea | Ana Belén, Conchita Velasco, Paco Rabal, Javier Escrivá, Rafael Alonso, Ismael Merlo, María Luisa San José, Amelia de la Torre, Milagros Leal, María Isbert | | | |
