= 2nd Goya Awards =

- Date: 22 March 1988
- Site: Palacio de Congresos, Madrid
- Hosted by: Fernando Fernán Gómez
- Organized by: Academy of Cinematographic Arts and Sciences of Spain

Highlights
- Best Film: The Enchanted Forest
- Best Actor: Alfredo Landa; The Enchanted Forest
- Best Actress: Verónica Forqué; A Merry Life
- Most awards: The Enchanted Forest (5)
- Most nominations: The Enchanted Forest (8)

Television coverage
- Network: TVE

The 2nd Goya Awards ceremony, presented by the Academy of Cinematographic Arts and Sciences of Spain, took place at the Palacio de Congresos de Madrid on 22 March 1988. It was hosted by Fernando Fernán Gómez.

The Enchanted Forest won the award for Best Film.

== Winners and nominees ==
The winners and nominees are listed as follows:

| Best Film: The Enchanted Forest; Divine Words; El Lute: Run for Your Life | Best Director: José Luis Garci – Course Completed; Vicente Aranda – El Lute: Run for Your Life; Bigas Luna – Anguish |
| Best Actor: Alfredo Landa – The Enchanted Forest; Imanol Arias – El Lute: Run for Your Life; José Manuel Cervino – The War of the Madmen | Best Actress: Verónica Forqué – A Merry Life; Victoria Abril – Lute: Run for Your Life; Irene Gutiérrez Caba – The House of Bernarda Alba |
| Best Supporting Actor: Juan Echanove – Divine Words; Agustín González – Moors and Christians; Pedro Ruiz – Moors and Christians | Best Supporting Actress: Verónica Forqué – Moors and Christians; Marisa Paredes – Turnip Top; Terele Pávez – Laura |
| Best Screenplay: Rafael Azcona – The Enchanted Forest; Manolo Matji – The War of the Madmen; Rafael Azcona, Luis García Berlanga – Moors and Christians | Best Spanish Language Foreign Film: Life Is Most Important • Mexico; Man Facing Southeast • Argentina; A Successful Man • Cuba |
| Best Cinematography: Fernando Arribas – Divine Words; Javier Aguirresarobe – The Enchanted Forest; Hans Burmann – La rusa | Best Editing: Pablo González del Amo – Divine Words; Julio Peña – Hostages in the Barrio; José Luis Matesanz – My General |
| Best Production Supervision: Marisol Carnicero – Turnip Top; Mario Morales – Course Completed; Daniel Vega – Policía | Best Special Effects: Francisco Teres – Anguish; John Collins – Rest in Pieces; Julián Martín – To the Four Winds |
| Best Sound: Miguel Ángel Polo, Enrique Molinero – Divine Words; Bernardo Menz, Enrique Molinero – The Enchanted Forest; Carlos Faruolo, Enrique Molinero – The Impeccable Sinner | Best Original Score: José Nieto – The Enchanted Forest; Milladoiro – Divine Words; Raúl Alcover – Guests |
| Best Art Direction: Rafael Palmero – The House of Bernarda Alba; Félix Murcia – The Enchanted Forest; Eduardo Torre de la Fuente – The Lieutenant Nun | Best Costume Design: Javier Artiñano – The Enchanted Forest; Pepe Rubico – The House of Bernarda Alba; Javier Artiñano – To the Four Winds |

== Honorary Goya ==
Rafaela Aparicio was the recipient of the Honorary Goya Award.
