= Turnip Top =

- Spanish: Cara de acelga
- Directed by: José Sacristán
- Screenplay by: José Sacristán
- Story by: José Sacristán; Carlos Pérez Marinero
- Produced by: Alfredo Matas
- Starring: José Sacristán; Fernando Fernán Gómez; Marisa Paredes; Emilio Gutiérrez Caba; Miguel Rellán; Amparo Baró; Amparo Soler Leal
- Cinematography: Carlos Suárez
- Edited by: José Luis Matesanz
- Music by: Ricardo Miralles
- Production companies: INCINE; Jet Films; Lince Films
- Release date: 20 January 1987
- Country: Spain
- Language: Spanish

Turnip Top (Spanish: Cara de acelga) is a 1987 Spanish road movie and comedy film directed and starred by José Sacristán, also featuring Fernando Fernán Gómez, Marisa Paredes, Emilio Gutiérrez Caba, Miguel Rellán, Amparo Baró, and Amparo Soler Leal.

== Plot ==
The plot follows the aimless adventures of hitchhiking drifter Antonio ("cara de acelga") and his encounters with a number of colourful characters.

== Cast ==
- José Sacristán as Antonio
- Fernando Fernán Gómez as Madariaga
- Marisa Paredes as Olga
- Emilio Gutiérrez Caba as Eusebio
- Miguel Rellán as Paquito
- Amparo Baró as Loles
- Amparo Soler Leal Acacia
- Rafaela Aparicio as Hospital Patient
- Raúl Sender
- Francisco Algora
- Luis Barbero

== Production ==
The film is an Incine, Lince Films, and Jet Films production. The screenplay was penned by Sacristán based on an original story by Sacristán and Carlos Pérez Merinero.

== Release ==
The film was theatrically released on 20 January 1987. It made an in-year gross of 30,893,384 ₧ (104,149 admissions).

== Reception ==
Jordi Batlle Caminal of El País deemed Turnip Top to be "a film peppered with a thousand and one anecdotes and a motley crew of colorful characters", "comedy in its sad state".

== Accolades ==
Year	Award	Category	Nominee(s)	Result	Ref.
1988	2nd Goya Awards	Best Production Supervision	Marisol Carnicero	Won	
1988	2nd Goya Awards	Best Supporting Actress	Marisa Paredes	Nominated	

== See also ==
- List of Spanish films of 1987
