= Amparo Baró =

Spanish actress

The Most Excellent Amparo Baró
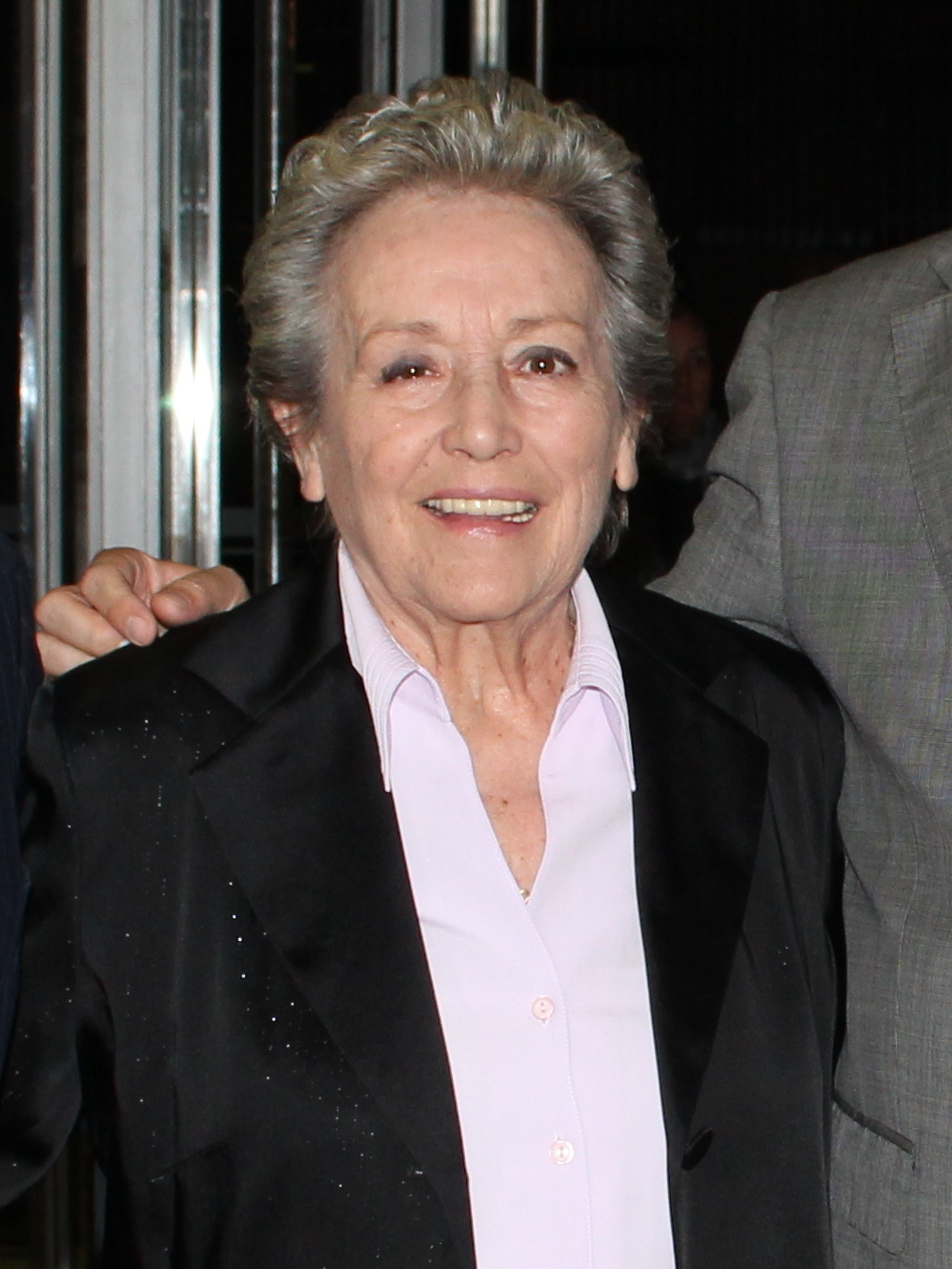
- Baró in 2013
- Born: Amparo Baró San Martín; 21 September 1937; Barcelona, Spain
- Died: 29 January 2015 (aged 77); Madrid, Spain
- Years active: 1957–2013
- Awards: Goya Award for Best Supporting Actress; 2007 Siete mesas de billar francés

Amparo Baró San Martín (21 September 1937 – 29 January 2015) was a Spanish actress. She starting working in theatres with Adolfo Marsillach. She first garnered critical and popular acclaim for her role as "Sole" in 7 Vidas. Her career spanned more than 50 years. She worked on stage as well as in films and television.

== Life ==
She discovered her vocation when her brothers took her to the theater, and 20 years later, she debuted on stage. This started the career of this fine, young-faced actress with roles in stage and in film distribution. After completing high school at a young age, she began her artistic activities, integrating into several groups of amateur theater in her native Catalonia. Her professional debut was on stage along with Adolfo Marsillach, in Windsor Theater (Barcelona), in 1957.

She was honored numerous times for her work. On 7 December 2007, the Council of Ministers of Spain presented her with the Gold Medal for Merit in Work. She died from cancer, aged 77, in 2015.

== Filmography ==
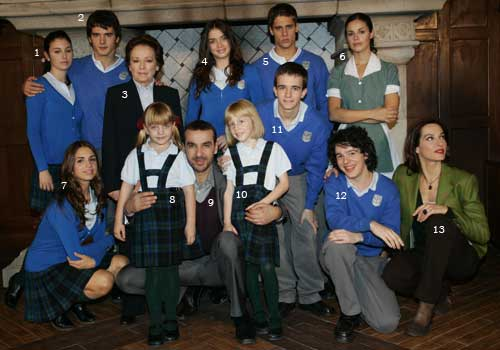
Amparo Baró (number3) with the actors of El Internado (2007).

- Tormento d'amore (1956, de Leonardo Bercovici Claudio Gora y Eduardo Manzanos)
- Carta a Sara (1957, de Leonardo Bercovici y Claudio Gora)
- Rapsodia de sangre (1958, de Antonio Isasi-Isasmendi)
- Llama un tal Esteban (1960, de Pedro Luis Ramírez)
- Trío de damas (1960, de Pedro Lazaga) as Empleada tienda de moda
- Adiós, Mimí Pompón (1961, de Luis Marquina) as Lorenza
- Margarita se llama mi amor (1961, de Ramón Fernández) as Alumna junto a Desi
- Tres de la Cruz Roja (1962, de Fernando Palacios) as Consuelito
- Sendas cruzadas (1962, de Juan Xiol)
- A Land for All (1962, de Antonio Isasi-Isasmendi) as María
- Operación Embajada (1963, de Fernando Palacios) as Conchita
- La chica del trébol (1963, de Sergio Grieco) as Alicia
- Tengo 17 años (1964, de José María Forqué) as Tendera
- La banda del Pecas (1968, de Jesús Pascual) as Marina Ruiz
- Carola de día, Carola de noche (1969, de Jaime de Armiñán)
- Al servicio de la mujer española (1978, de Jaime de Armiñán) as Mari Galdós
- El divorcio que viene (1981, de Pedro Masó) as Paquita
- El nido (1979, de Jaime de Armiñán) as Fuen
- Apaga... y vámonos (1981, de Antonio Hernández) as Rosario
- 27 millones libres de impuestos (1981, de Pedro Masó) as Pity
- En septiembre (1982, de Jaime de Armiñán) as Aurora
- Stico (1985, de Jaime de Armiñán) as Felisa
- El elegido (1985, de Fernando Huertas) as Pilar
- Cara de acelga (1987, de José Sacristán) as Loles
- Mi general (1987, de Jaime de Armiñán) as Señora Crespo
- El bosque animado (1987, de José Luis Cuerda) as Amelia Roade
- Soldadito español (1988, de Antonio Giménez Rico) as Lola
- Las cosas del querer (1988, de Jaime Chávarri) as Balbina
- Al otro lado del túnel (1994, de Jaime de Armiñán) as Rosa
- Las cosas del querer: Segunda parte (1995, de Jaime Chávarri) as Balbina
- El Palomo cojo (1995, de Jaime de Armiñán) as Reglita
- Boca a boca (1995, de Manuel Gómez Pereira) as Madre de Raúl
- Noviembre (2003, de Achero Mañas) as Helena
- Siete mesas de billar francés (2007, de Gracia Querejeta) as Emilia
- Maktub (2011, de Paco Arango) as Merche

== Honours ==
- Gold Medal of Merit in Labour (Kingdom of Spain, 7 December 2007).
