= The War of the Madmen =

- Spanish: La guerra de los locos
- Directed by: Manolo Matji
- Screenplay by: Manolo Matji
- Story by: Isaac Montero
- Produced by: José María Calleja
- Starring: Álvaro de Luna; José Manuel Cervino; Juan Luis Galiardo; Pep Munné; Luis Marín; Pedro del Corral; Emilio Laín; Joan Potau; Cesáreo Estébanez; Francisco Algora; Patxi Catalá; Achero Mañas; Manuela Camacho; Emilio Gutiérrez Caba; Maite Blasco; Ana Marzoa; Alicia Sánchez
- Cinematography: Federico Ribes
- Edited by: Nieves Martín
- Music by: Pepe Nieto
- Production company: Xaloc PC
- Distributed by: InCine
- Release date: 11 April 1987
- Country: Spain
- Language: Spanish

The War of the Madmen a.k.a. The War of the Loonies (Spanish: La guerra de los locos) is a 1987 Spanish drama film directed by Manolo Matji (in his directorial debut) which stars Álvaro de Luna, José Manuel Cervino, and Juan Luis Galiardo.

== Plot ==
Set in August 1936 against the backdrop of the Spanish Civil War, the plot explores the plight of a group of asylum inmates, who come across a group of guerrilla fighters after escaping from the psychiatric hospital upon the break-in of Rebel forces.

== Cast ==
- Álvaro de Luna as Saturnino Grande, el Rubio
- José Manuel Cervino as Ángel Frutos
- Juan Luis Galiardo as don Salvador
- Pep Munné
- Luis Marín
- Pedro Díez del Corral as Rufino
- Emilio Laín as Serafín
- Joan Potau as Rafael
- Cesáreo Estébanez as Paulino
- Francisco Algora
- Patxi Catalá as Emilio
- Achero Mañas
- Manuela Camacho
- Pepe Yepes
- Emilio Gutiérrez Caba as comandante
- Maite Blasco
- Alberto A. López as Bartolo
- Ana Marzoa
- Alicia Sánchez

== Production ==
The film is a Xaloc PC (José María Calleja) production. It was lensed by Federico Ribes, scored by José Nieto, and edited by Nieves Martín.

== Release ==
The film was released theatrically in Spain on 11 April 1987. It grossed 9,271,979 ₧ (30,446 admissions).

== Reception ==
Ángel Fernández-Santos of El País assessed that despite the film suffering at its opening (in which the helmer should have explored the bad guy's evilness more and with more nastiness) it grows in potency as it progresses.

== Accolades ==
Year	Award	Category	Nominee(s)	Result	Ref.
1988	2nd Goya Awards	Best Screenplay	Manolo Matji	Nominated	
1988	2nd Goya Awards	Best Actor	José Manuel Cervino	Nominated	

== See also ==
- List of Spanish films of 1987
