= The Lost Paradise (1985 film) =

- Theatrical release poster
- Spanish: Los paraísos perdidos
- Directed by: Basilio Martín Patino
- Written by: Basilio Martín Patino
- Starring: Charo López; Alfredo Landa; Juan Diego; Miguel Narros; Ana Torrent; Paco Rabal
- Cinematography: José Luis Alcaine
- Edited by: Pablo García del Amo
- Music by: Carmelo Bernaola
- Production company: La Linterna Mágica
- Distributed by: United International Pictures
- Release dates: August 1985 (Venice); 17 October 1985 (Spain)
- Country: Spain
- Language: Spanish

The Lost Paradise (Spanish: Los paraísos perdidos) is a 1985 Spanish film directed by Basilio Martín Patino. It stars Charo López alongside Alfredo Landa, Juan Diego, Miguel Narros, Ana Torrent and Paco Rabal.

== Plot ==
An unnamed mature woman, daughter of a Spanish Republican exiled lecturer, returns to her parents' country, where she meets a number of people from her past, including Miguel, Benito, Lorenzo and an unnamed Socialist politician. She translates Hölderlin's Hyperion in the family house.

The film, an expression of the disenchantment experienced after the Spanish transition, underpins a criticism to the transition itself and the so-called pacto del olvido.

== Cast ==
- Charo López as Ella (She) (Note: While the character is not named in the film, the character can be read as Berta from Nueve cartas a Berta (1966). The latter character is not featured onscreen in the 1966 film.)
- Alfredo Landa as Benito
- Juan Diego as Minister of Culture (Javier Solana)
- Miguel Narros as Miguel
- Ana Torrent as Andrea
- Paco Rabal
- Juan Cueto as Lorenzo Carvajal
- Amancio Prada
- Isabel Pallarés
- Félix Dafauce
- Walter Haubrich

== Production ==
Shooting locations included Ávila, Toro, Salamanca, Madrid and Zamora.

== Release ==
The film screened at the 42nd Venice International Film Festival in August 1985. It was theatrically released on 17 October 1985.

== Reception ==
Ángel Fernández-Santos of El País, considered The Lost Paradise to be a "prodigiously assembled" film, to which the camera of Alcaine "bordering on the sublime" and the musical score's intensity and coupling add up, filling it "with rare beauty", while noting that it featured a couple of events (two additions of "foreign coarseness") totally out of place.

== See also ==
- List of Spanish films of 1985

== Bibliography ==
- García Martínez, Alberto Nahum (2005). Realidad y representación en el cine de Basilio Martín Patino. Montaje, falsificación, metaficción y ensayo (PDF) (PhD thesis). Universidad de Navarra. doi:10.13140/RG.2.1.1692.4401.
- Heredero, Carlos F. (2018). "Basilio Martín Patino. El poder de imaginar lo real". Patino/Birri. Estrategias frente a lo real (PDF). Málaga: Festival de Cine de Málaga e Iniciativas Audiovisuales, S.A. ISBN 978-84-09-00899-5.
- Naharro-Calderón, José María (2012). "Entre la mneme de En el balcón vacío y la anamnesis de Tiempo de llorar". In Lluch-Prats, Javier (ed.). En el balcón vacío. La segunda generación del exilio republicano en México (PDF). Madrid: AEMIC. ISBN 978-84-616-0199-8.
- Pavlović, Tatjana (2008). "Los paraísos perdidos: Cinema of Return and Repetition (Basilio Martín Patino, 1985)". In Resina, Joan Ramon (ed.). Burning Darkness. A Half Century of Spanish Cinema. State University of New York Press. pp. 105–124. ISBN 978-0-7914-7503-4.
