= Ana Marzoa =

Argentine-Spanish actress

- Born: Ana Beatriz Vázquez Argibay; 15 September 1949 (age 76); Buenos Aires, Argentina
- Occupation: Actress
- Awards: National Theater Prize (1986); Ercilla Theater Award (2000)

Ana Beatriz Vázquez Argibay (born 15 September 1949), better known as Ana Marzoa, is an Argentine-Spanish actress.

== Biography ==
The daughter of Galician emigrants, Ana Marzoa was born in Buenos Aires, and from a very young age she studied theater, classical dance, teaching, and music.

== Career ==
In 1971, Marzoa moved to Spain, where she has developed almost her entire professional career.

Marzoa has been present on Spanish stages for more than three decades, where she has played a large number of characters. Among her creations most celebrated by critics and the public is Rosaura in the play Life Is a Dream by Calderón de la Barca, directed by José Luis Gómez. She has also performed in, among others, La Dorotea by Lope de Vega, Punishment without Revenge (1985), and El concierto de San Ovidio (both directed by Miguel Narros), and the play Stepping Out by Richard Harris.

Her popularity began to grow rapidly after appearing on the television series Anillos de oro and Segunda enseñanza by Ana Diosdado and Pedro Masó.

In 2017 she debuted on the Antena 3 series Pulsaciones, which had a closed plot and concluded in its first season.

== Filmography ==
=== Theater ===
- Ligazón by Ramón del Valle-Inclán (1975)
- Harold and Maude by Colin Higgins (1975)
- La doble historia del doctor Valmy by Antonio Buero Vallejo (1976)
- Tribute by Bernard Slade (1980)
- Life is a Dream by Calderón de la Barca (1981)
- La Dorotea by Lope de Vega (1983)
- Antigone by Sophocles, Mérida Festival (1983)
- Tales from the Vienna Woods by Ödön von Horváth (1984)
- Electra by Eurípides, Teatro Romano de Mérida (1984)
- Punishment Without Revenge by Lope de Vega (1985)
- El concierto de San Ovidio by Antonio Buero Vallejo (1986)
- Stepping Out by Richard Harris (1986)
- The Unloved Woman by Jacinto Benavente (1988)
- Separation by Tom Kempinski (1989)
- Caligula by Albert Camus, Mérida Festival (1990)
- Lost in Yonkers by Neil Simon (1992)
- A Streetcar Named Desire by Tennessee Williams (1993)
- Los bosques de Nyx by Javier Tomeo (1994)
- Fear and Misery of the Third Reich by Bertolt Brecht (1995)
- An Ideal Husband by Oscar Wilde (1996)
- La hermana pequeña by Carmen Martín Gaite (1999)
- Madrugada by Antonio Buero Vallejo (2000)
- A View from the Bridge by Arthur Miller (2000)
- The Price by Arthur Miller (2003)
- Tras las huellas de Bette Davis (Muñecas rotas) by Eugenio Arredondo (2007)
- The Lady from Trévelez by Carlos Arniches (2007)
- The Night of the Iguana by Tennessee Williams (2009)
- Las más fuertes by Eusebio Lázaro (2011)
- Verano by Jorge Roelas (2011)
- Y la casa crecía by Jesús Campo (2016)
- Cat on a Hot Tin Roof by Tennessee Williams

=== Television ===
- Una vida para amarte (1970)
- Así amaban los héroes (1971)
- Cuentos y leyendas
  - El regreso de Edelmiro (9 January 1976)
- Las viudas
  - Viuda castellana (3 May 1977)
- Curro Jiménez
  - Una larga ausencia (29 December 1976)
  - Una larga distancia (11 December 1977)
- Cañas y Barro (1978)
- Estudio 1
  - The Winslow Boy (11 October 1982)
  - Al final de la cuerda (18 April 1979)
- Cervantes (1981)
- Anillos de oro
  - El país de las maravillas (11 November 1983)
- El jardín de Venus
  - Salvada (13 November 1983)
  - Condecorado (29 November 1983)
- La huella del crimen
  - El caso del procurador enamorado (1984)
- Segunda enseñanza (1986)
- Primera función
  - La dama del alba (19 January 1989)
- Crónicas del mal
  - La casa embrujada (20 November 1992)
- Función de noche
  - Los bosques de Nyx (8 July 1995)
- Historias del otro lado
  - Delirium (15 May 1991)
  - Mujer con violetas (14 February 1996)
  - El despacho del doctor Armengot (28 April 1996)
- Policías, en el corazón de la calle (2001–2003)
- 7 vidas
  - Atraco a las tres (12 February 2006)
- Hospital Central
  - Señales de humo (21 June 2006)
- B&b, de boca en boca
  - La verdad sobre Paula Dobao (2 April 2014)
- Vis a vis (2018)
- Estoy vivo (2018)

=== Film ===
- Blum by Julio Porter (1970)
- Los amantes by Manuel J. Catalán (1973)
- Dale nomás by Osías Wilenski (1974)
- The Bananas Boat by Sidney Hayers (1976)
- El día del presidente by Pedro Ruiz (1979)
- ¡Qué verde era mi duque! by José María Forqué (1980)
- Palmira by José Luis Olaizola (1982)
- La guerra de los locos by Manolo Matji (1987)
- La gran familia... 30 años después by Pedro Masó (1999)
- Calle Libertad by Begoña Saugar (2004)

== Awards ==
- Fotogramas de Plata Award: nominee in 1983 (for the series Anillos de oro), in 1993 (for the play A Streetcar Named Desire), and in 1996 (for the play An Ideal Husband)
- María Guerrero Award (1985)
- Miguel Mihura Award (for the 1985–86 season), for the plays Punishment without Revenge and El concierto de San Ovidio
- National Theater Prize (1986)
- Ercilla Theater Award (2000), for the play Madrugada
- Nominated for the Mayte and Teatro de Rojas Awards (for The Night of the Iguana)
