= Moors and Christians (film) =

- Theatrical release poster
- Spanish: Moros y cristianos
- Directed by: Luis García Berlanga
- Written by: Rafael Azcona; Luis García Berlanga
- Starring: Fernando Fernán Gómez; Verónica Forqué; Agustín González; Chus Lampreave; José L. López Vázquez; Andrés Pajares; M.ª Luisa Ponte; Antonio Resines; Pedro Ruiz; Rosa M.ª Sardá
- Cinematography: Domingo Solano
- Edited by: José Luis Matesanz
- Production companies: Anola Films S.A.; Estela Films S.A.; Anem Films S.A.
- Distributed by: United International Pictures
- Release dates: 23 October 1987 (Seminci); 28 October 1987 (Spain)
- Running time: 116 min
- Country: Spain
- Language: Spanish
- Budget: c. 200 million ₧

Moors and Christians (Spanish: Moros y cristianos) is a 1987 Spanish comedy film directed by Luis García Berlanga. The cast features Fernando Fernán Gómez, Verónica Forqué, Agustín González, Chus Lampreave, José Luis López Vázquez, Andrés Pajares, María Luisa Ponte, Antonio Resines, Pedro Ruiz and Rosa María Sardá.

== Plot ==
The Planchadell y Calabuig, a family of turrón-makers from Xixona (province of Alicante), travel to Madrid to sell their product. Once there, they are approached by an image consultant.

== Cast ==
- Fernando Fernán-Gómez as Fernando.
- Rosa María Sardá as Cuqui.
- Andrés Pajares as Marcial.
- José Luis López Vázquez as Jacinto López.
- Agustín González as Agustín
- Verónica Forqué as Monique.
- Pedro Ruiz as Pepe.
- María Luisa Ponte as Marcella del Piamonte.
- Antonio Resines as Olivares.
- Chus Lampreave as Antonia.
- Luis Escobar as fray Félix.
- Florentino Soria as Florentino.
- Joan Monleón as Joan.
- Luis Ciges as señor Ropero.
- Diana Peñalver as criada de Cuqui.
- Chari Moreno as esposa de Pepe.
- Juan Tamarit reportero de la revista Hola.
- Elena Santonja as herself.
- José Luis Coll as himself.
- Antonio de Senillosa as don Antonio.
- Antonio Gómez Rufo as Palomares.
- Emilio Laguna as camarero marisquería.
- Juan de Pablos as delegado Salón Gastronómico.
- Xavier Domingo as Delacroix.
- Jorge Luis Roelas as turronero.
- Pilar Ordóñez as policía municipal.
- Félix Dafauce as anciano.

== Production ==
The film had a budget of around 200 million ₧. Filming began in Madrid by May 1987.

== Release ==
Moors and Christians premiered on 23 October 1987 at the 32nd Seminci, screened as the opening film of the festival. It was theatrically released in Spain on 28 October 1987.

== Reception ==
Fotogramas gave the film 2 out of 5 stars, deeming it to be one of the most disappointing films in Berlanga's filmography. Ángel Fernández-Santos of El País considered that what was a "state of grace" in Plácido had seemingly slipped into "a state of disgrace" in Moors and Christians. He also noted that while Pajares, Forqué and Ponte's performances worked just fine, the rest of performances only worked intermittently or not at all.

== Awards and nominations ==
Year	Award	Category	Nominee(s)	Result	Ref.
1988	2nd Goya Awards	Best Screenplay	Rafael Azcona & Luis García Berlanga	Nominated	
1988	2nd Goya Awards	Best Supporting Actress	Verónica Forqué	Won	
1988	2nd Goya Awards	Best Supporting Actor	Agustín González	Nominated	
1988	2nd Goya Awards	Best Supporting Actor	Pedro Ruiz	Nominated	

== See also ==
- List of Spanish films of 1987
