= At the Service of Spanish Womanhood =

- Theatrical release poster
- Original title: Al servicio de la mujer española
- Directed by: Jaime de Armiñán
- Written by: Jaime de Armiñán
- Starring: Marilina Ross; Adolfo Marsillach; Emilio Gutiérrez Caba; Amparo Baró; Mary Carrillo
- Cinematography: Domingo Solano
- Edited by: José Luis Matesanz
- Music by: Carmen Santonja
- Production company: Exclusivas Molpeceres PC
- Release date: 20 October 1978
- Country: Spain
- Language: Spanish

At the Service of Spanish Womanhood (Spanish: Al servicio de la mujer española) is a 1978 drama film written and directed by Jaime de Armiñán starring Marilina Ross and Adolfo Marsillach. The film uses the post-Francoist context of freedom to convey the Francoist legacy of repression.

== Plot ==
Female radio presenter Irene Galdós works in the Conservative-leaning love advice program "Entre nosotras" broadcast on Radio Pontevedra, with her suggestions still largely adhering to the dictatorship's Sección Femenina guidelines. Her anonide life is upended upon coming across the cinical and perverse Julio Hernández, scarred by the memories of his traumatizing Francoist education.

== Cast ==
- Marilina Ross as Irene
- Adolfo Marsillach as Julio
- Emilio Gutiérrez Caba as Manolo
- Amparo Baró as María Rosa
- Mari Carrillo as Celsa
- José Ruiz Lifante as cura ('priest')

== Production ==
Shooting locations included Vigo.

== Release ==
The film was released theatrically on 20 October 1978.

== See also ==
- List of Spanish films of 1978
