= Zampo y yo =

- Directed by: Luis Lucia
- Screenplay by: Luis Lucia, Leonardo Martín
- Music by: Adolfo Waitzman
- Release date: 1965
- Running time: 105 min
- Country: Spanish
- Language: Spanish

Zampo y yo (lit. 'Zampo and me', 'Zampo and I') is a 1965 Spanish musical film starring Ana Belén and Fernando Rey. The film was directed by Luis Lucia and written by him and Leonardo Martín.

The film was a commercial failure back when it was released, but has been able to reach a wide public thanks to television and has come to be appreciated. Luis Lucia has since said that it was the film he was most proud of.

The film was to launch 13-year-old Ana Belén (who took this pseudonym after her character) as a "singing child prodigy" similar to Marisol, but that didn't happen because of the film flopping. She had been contracted to star in four movies in total, but the remaining three never came into existence.

== Plot ==
A girl named Ana Belén, the only daughter of an important businessman, feels neglected, lonely and socially isolated. One day she meets and befriends a clown named Zampo, who introduces her to the wonderful world of the circus.

== Cast ==
- Ana Belén as Ana Belén
- Fernando Rey as Zampo
- Luis Dávila as Carlos

== Music ==
The soundtrack was provided by Argentinian composer Adolfo Waitzman. While preparing for the movie, Ana Belén took music classes from him.

== Awards ==
Year	Award	Category	Nominee(s)	Result	Ref.
1965	CEC Awards	Best Script	Luis Lucia, Leonardo Martín, Joaquín Parejo Díaz, Raúl Peña	Won	
