= Mercedes Prendes =

Spanish actress

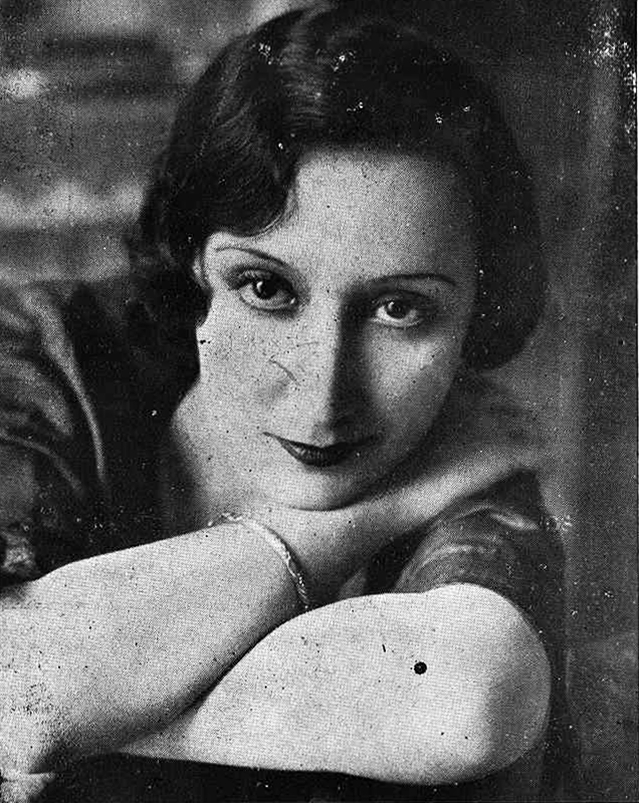
- Born: Mercedes Prendes; 22 April 1903; Gijón, Spain
- Died: 2 July 1981 (aged 67); Madrid, Spain
- Occupation: Actor

Mercedes Prendes (14 April 1903 – 2 July 1981) was a Spanish actor. During a long career, notably between 1927 and 1940, she took a number of cinema roles, and towards the end of her career she appeared regularly in television dramas. It is nevertheless principally as a stage actress that she built her career and made her reputation.

== Biography ==
Mercedes Prendes Estrada was born in Gijón, the first-born of three siblings who grew up to become notable as stage and screen actors. The other two professional thespians in the family were Mari Carmen Prendes (1906–2002) and Luis Prendes (1913–1998). There are some sources for Mercedes Prendes having been born in 1908, but elsewhere those who have looked into the matter insist that her birth year should correctly be given as 1903. Alfonso Prendes Fernández (1875–1917), her father, was a career soldier. Her parents had married in 1902: her mother, born Mercedes Estrada Arnaiz (1881–1950), was originally from El Ferrol in the north-western province of Coruña. Her father's career choice meant that, at least by the standards of those times, relocations came frequently. After she had spent the first eight years of her life in Asturias the family moved to Melilla on the coast of North Africa, where in due course she was enrolled at a co-educational secondary school. Sources record that she was a "good student".

Her stage debut came in 1926 when she joined the Josefina Díaz theatre company in a production of the comedy "La extraña aventura" ("The strange adventure"). That was followed by "Fruto bendito" by the dramatist Eduardo Marquina, in which she appeared with the same company. She also appeared, during these early days, in production from the theatre company of Irene Alba. She almost immediately emerged as one of Spain's leading theatrical talents. Critics were appreciative of her physical beauty and powerful stage presence.

For eight seasons during the 1940s she was one of the leading performers at the Teatro Español in Madrid, then under the directorship of Cayetano Luca de Tena, playing a large number of leading roles such as those of Lady Macbeth in 1942, Juliet in 1943, Desdemona and Titania, both in 1944, also with important roles in "Richard III" (1946) and "Hamlet" (1949). Although her focus was relentlessly on the European classics, her starring stage roles during the 1940s extended far beyond Shakespeare, however. She portrayed Antigone in 1945 and featured as Leonore in Schiller's "Fiesco" (1949). Naturally Golden Age Spanish repertoire also featured prominently, with lead roles in "Castigo sin venganza" (1943), "La discreta enamorada" (1945), "La malcasada" (1947) and "Fuenteovejuna" by Lope de Vega. There were performance in "La dama duende" (1942) and "La devoción de la cruz" by Pedro Calderón de la Barca. Among more modern works, Mercedes Prendes appeared in Agustín de Foxá's Baile en capitanía (1944).

In 1949 Mercedes Prendes and Carlos Martínez de Tejada (?-1972), her actor husband, teamed up together to set up their own theatre company. For the next three years undertook several tours in Latin America, reprising some of Prendes' earlier roles and presenting the Spanish classical repertoire more generally. The company championed the work of Jacinto Benavente the young Madrid dramatist, Antonio Buero Vallejo

In 1955 Mercedes Prendes accepted a teaching professorshipat the Royal Copnservatory of Madrid (now part of the Royal Higher Academy of Dramatic Arts). Four years later she won the National Theater Prize with a performance of William Inge's "Vuelve, querida Sheba".

Television emerged in Spain during the later 1950s and during the early 1960 Mercedes Prendes successfully transitioned to the new medium, involved in a wide range of television dramas produced by the government controlled Televisión Española company, notably on the drama channels Estudio 1 and Novela. In contrast to her stage and television successes, none of the handful of movies in which Prendes participated between 1927 and 1939 made much of an impression on commentators.
