= Goya Award for Best Original Score =

Annual award by the Spanish Film Academy

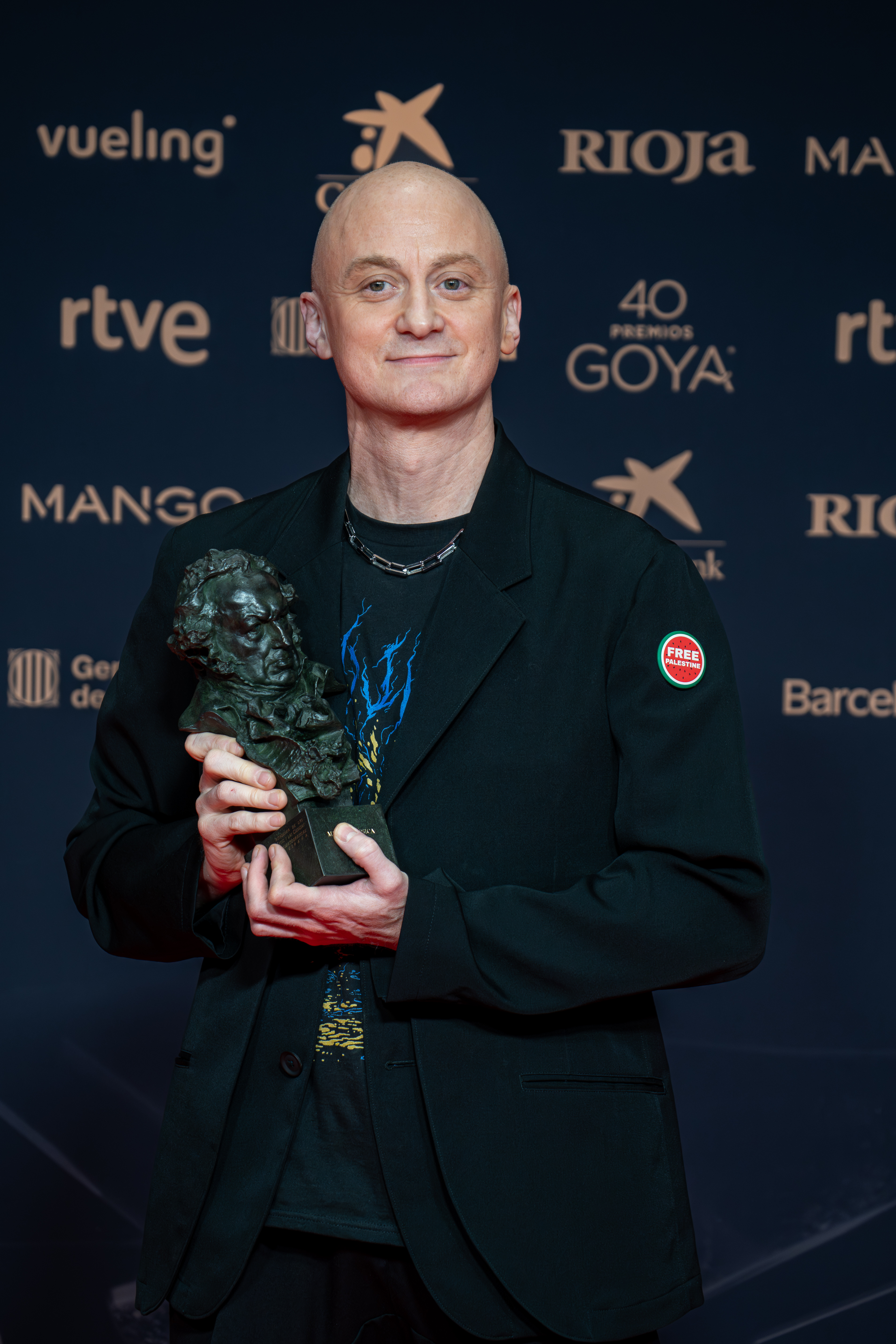
- The 2026 recipient: Kangding Ray
- Native name: Premio Goya a la mejor música original
- Awarded for: Best original score written specifically for a Spanish film of the year
- Country: Spain
- Presented by: Academy of Cinematographic Arts and Sciences of Spain (AACCE)
- First award: 1st Goya Awards (1986)
- Most recent winner: Kangding Ray; Sirāt (2025)
- Website: Official website

The Goya Award for Best Original Score (Premio Goya a la mejor música original) is one of the Goya Awards presented annually by the Academy of Cinematographic Arts and Sciences of Spain (AACCE) since the awards debuted in 1986. It is presented to the composer who has written an outstanding original score specifically for a Spanish film.

Spanish folk band Milladoiro was the first winner of the award for their work in the film Half of Heaven (1986). Composer Alberto Iglesias holds the record of most wins and nominations for this award, winning eleven times out of seventeen nominations.

For the 39th ceremony, the AACCE introduced a modification consisting of the requirement of a declaration signed by the producers accrediting the non-submission of AI-generated compositions.

In the list below the winner of the award for each year is shown first, followed by the other nominees.

== Winners and nominees ==
=== 1980s ===
Year	English title	Original title	Recipient(s)
1986 (1st)	Half of Heaven	La mitad del cielo	Milladoiro
1986 (1st)	The Disputed Vote of Mr. Cayo	El disputado voto del Sr. Cayo	Emilio Arrieta
1986 (1st)	Dragon Rapide		Xavier Montsalvatge
1987 (2nd)	El bosque animado		José Nieto
1987 (2nd)	Divinas palabras		Milladoiro
1987 (2nd)	Los invitados		Raúl Alcover
1988 (3rd)	Pasodoble		Carmelo Bernaola
1988 (3rd)	Berlín Blues		Lalo Schifrin
1988 (3rd)	El Dorado		Alejandro Masso
1988 (3rd)	Rowing with the Wind	Remando al viento	Alejandro Masso
1988 (3rd)	Women on the Verge of a Nervous Breakdown	Mujeres al borde de un ataque de nervios	Bernardo Bonezzi
1989 (4th)	Love, Hate and Death	Montoyas y Tarantos	Paco de Lucía
1989 (4th)	Bajarse al moro		Pata Negra
1989 (4th)	Twisted Obsession	El sueño del mono loco	Antoine Duhamel
1989 (4th)	Esquilache		José Nieto
1989 (4th)	The Things of Love	Las cosas del querer	Gregorio García Segura

=== 1990s ===
Year	English title	Original title	Recipient(s)
1990 (5th)	The Most Natural Thing	Lo más natural	José Nieto
1990 (5th)	Tie Me Up! Tie Me Down!	¡Átame!	Ennio Morricone
1990 (5th)	¡Ay Carmela!		Alejandro Massó
1991 (6th)	The Dumbfounded King	El rey pasmado	José Nieto
1991 (6th)	Don Juan in Hell	Don Juan en los infiernos	Alejandro Massó
1991 (6th)	Anything for Bread	Todo por la pasta	Bernardo Bonezzi
1992 (7th)	The Fencing Master	El maestro de esgrima	José Nieto
1992 (7th)	Vacas		Alberto Iglesias
1992 (7th)	Belle Époque		Antoine Duhamel
1993 (8th)	The Red Squirrel	La ardilla roja	Alberto Iglesias
1993 (8th)	Intruder	Intruso	José Nieto
1993 (8th)	Why Do They Call It Love When They Mean Sex?	¿Por qué lo llaman amor cuando quieren decir sexo?	Manolo Tena
1994 (9th)	The Turkish Passion	La pasión turca	José Nieto
1994 (9th)	Cradle Song	Canción de cuna	Manuel Balboa
1994 (9th)	El detective y la muerte		Suso Saiz
1995 (10th)	Nobody Will Speak of Us When We're Dead	Nadie hablará de nosotras cuando hayamos muerto	Bernardo Bonezzi
1995 (10th)	The Day of the Beast	El día de la bestia	Battista Bena
1995 (10th)	El porqué de las cosas		Carles Cases
1996 (11th)	Earth	Tierra	Alberto Iglesias
1996 (11th)	The Dog in the Manger	El perro del hortelano	José Nieto
1996 (11th)	Robert Rylands' Last Journey	El último viaje de Robert Rylands	Ángel Illarramendi
1997 (12th)	The Lucky Star	La buena estrella	Eva Gancedo
1997 (12th)	Perdita Durango		Simon Boswell
1997 (12th)	Tic Tac		José Manuel Pagán
1998 (13th)	Lovers of the Arctic Circle	Los amantes del círculo polar	Alberto Iglesias
1998 (13th)	The Girl of Your Dreams	La niña de tus ojos	Antoine Duhamel
1998 (13th)	The Stolen Years	Los años bárbaros	Juan Bardem Aguado
1998 (13th)	Mararía		Pedro Guerra
1999 (14th)	All About My Mother	Todo sobre mi madre	Alberto Iglesias
1999 (14th)	By My Side Again	Cuando vuelvas a mi lado	Ángel Illarramendi, Andrés Vázquez, Hugo Westerdahl and Gregorio Lozano
1999 (14th)	Butterfly's Tongue	La lengua de las mariposas	Alejandro Amenábar
1999 (14th)	Solas		Antonio Meliveo

=== 2000s ===
Year	English title	Original title	Recipient(s)
2000 (15th)	I Know Who You Are	Sé quién eres	José Nieto
2000 (15th)	Asfalto		Najwajean and Nacho Mastretta
2000 (15th)	Common Wealth	La comunidad	Roque Baños
2000 (15th)	Plenilune	Plenilunio	Antonio Meliveo
2001 (16th)	Sex and Lucia	Lucía y el sexo	Alberto Iglesias
2001 (16th)	Mad Love	Juana La Loca	José Nieto
2001 (16th)	The Others	Los otros	Alejandro Amenábar
2001 (16th)	Don't Tempt Me	Sin noticias de Dios	Bernardo Bonezzi
2002 (17th)	Talk to Her	Hable con ella	Alberto Iglesias
2002 (17th)	800 Bullets	800 balas	Roque Baños
2002 (17th)	My Mother Likes Women	A mi madre le gustan las mujeres	Juan Bardem
2002 (17th)	In the City Without Limits	En la ciudad sin límites	Víctor Reyes
2003 (18th)	South from Granada	Al sur de Granada	Juan Bardem
2003 (18th)	Eyengui, el dios del sueño		Santi Vega
2003 (18th)	Danube Hotel	Hotel Danubio	Pablo Cervantes
2003 (18th)	Valentín		Juan Carlos Cuello
2004 (19th)	The Sea Inside	Mar adentro	Alejandro Amenábar
2004 (19th)	The Machinist		Roque Baños
2004 (19th)	Héctor		Ángel Illarramendi
2004 (19th)	Inconscientes		Sergio Moure
2005 (20th)	Habana Blues		Juan Antonio Leyva, José Luis Garrido, Equis Alfonso, Descemer Bueno, Dayán Abad, Kiki Ferrer, Kelvis Ochoa and Magda Rosa Galván
2005 (20th)	The Night of the Brother	La noche del hermano	Eva Gancedo
2005 (20th)	Ninette		Pablo Cervantes
2005 (20th)	Fragile	Frágiles	Roque Baños
2006 (21st)	Volver		Alberto Iglesias
2006 (21st)	Pan's Labyrinth	El laberinto del fauno	Javier Navarrete
2006 (21st)	Alatriste		Roque Baños
2006 (21st)	Salvador (Puig Antich)		Lluís Llach
2007 (22nd)	13 Roses	Las 13 rosas	Roque Baños
2007 (22nd)	Under the Stars	Bajo las estrellas	Mikel Salas
2007 (22nd)	The Orphanage	El orfanato	Fernando Velázquez
2007 (22nd)	Oviedo Express		Carlos Cases
2008 (23rd)	The Oxford Murders	Los crímenes de Oxford	Roque Baños
2008 (23rd)	Che: The Argentine	Ché, el argentino	Alberto Iglesias
2008 (23rd)	The Hanged Man	El juego del ahorcado	Bingen Mendizábal
2008 (23rd)	The Blind Sunflowers	Los girasoles ciegos	Lucio Godoy
2009 (24th)	Broken Embraces	Los abrazos rotos	Alberto Iglesias
2009 (24th)	Agora	Ágora	Dario Marianelli
2009 (24th)	Cell 211	Celda 211	Roque Baños
2009 (24th)	The Secret in Their Eyes	El secreto de sus ojos	Federico Jusid

=== 2010s ===
Year	English title	Original title	Recipient(s)
2010 (25th)	Even the Rain	También la lluvia	Alberto Iglesias
2010 (25th)	Biutiful		Gustavo Santaolalla
2010 (25th)	Buried	Buried (Enterrado)	Víctor Reyes
2010 (25th)	The Last Circus	Balada triste de trompeta	Roque Baños
2011 (26th)	The Skin I Live In	La piel que habito	Alberto Iglesias
2011 (26th)	Blackthorn		Lucio Godoy
2011 (26th)	EVA		Evgueni Galperine and Sacha Galperine
2011 (26th)	No Rest for the Wicked	No habrá paz para los malvados	Mario de Benito
2012 (27th)	Blancanieves		Alfonso de Villalonga
2012 (27th)	The Impossible	Lo imposible	Fernando Velázquez
2012 (27th)	Tad, The Lost Explorer	Las aventuras de Tadeo Jones	Álex Martínez and Zacarías M. de la Riva
2012 (27th)	Unit 7	Grupo 7	Julio de la Rosa
2013 (28th)	Living Is Easy with Eyes Closed	Vivir es fácil con los ojos cerrados	Pat Metheny
2013 (28th)	The Mule	La mula	Óscar Navarro
2013 (28th)	A Night in Old Mexico		Emilio Aragón Álvarez
2013 (28th)	Witching & Bitching	Las brujas de Zugarramurdi	Joan Valent
2014 (29th)	Marshland	La isla mínima	Julio de la Rosa
2014 (29th)	Loreak (Flowers)	Loreak	Pascal Gaigne
2014 (29th)	El Niño		Roque Baños
2014 (29th)	Wild Tales	Relatos salvajes	Gustavo Santaolalla
2015 (30th)	Nobody Wants the Night	Nadie quiere la noche	Lucas Vidal
2015 (30th)	The Bride	La novia	Shigeru Umebayashi
2015 (30th)	El teatro del más allá. Chavín de Huántar		Santi Vega
2015 (30th)	Ma Ma		Alberto Iglesias
2016 (31st)	A Monster Calls	Un monstruo viene a verme	Fernando Velázquez
2016 (31st)	The Olive Tree	El olivo	Pascal Gaigne
2016 (31st)	Julieta		Alberto Iglesias
2016 (31st)	Smoke & Mirrors	El hombre de las mil caras	Julio de la Rosa
2017 (32nd)	Giant	Handia	Pascal Gaigne
2017 (32nd)	The Bookshop	La librería	Alfonso Vilallonga
2017 (32nd)	Verónica		Chucky Namanera
2017 (32nd)	The Summit	La cordillera	Alberto Iglesias
2018 (33rd)	The Realm	El reino	Olivier Arson
2018 (33rd)	Yuli		Alberto Iglesias
2018 (33rd)	En las estrellas		Iván Palomares
2018 (33rd)	Gun City	La sombra de la ley	Manuel Riveiro and Xavi Font
2019 (34th)	Pain and Glory	Dolor y gloria	Alberto Iglesias
2019 (34th)	Buñuel in the Labyrinth of the Turtles	Buñuel en el laberinto de las tortugas	Arturo Cardelús
2019 (34th)	The Endless Trench	La trinchera infinita	Pascal Gaigne
2019 (34th)	While at War	Mientras dure la guerra	Alejandro Amenábar

=== 2020s ===
Year	English title	Original title	Recipient(s)
2020 (35th)	Coven	Akelarre	Maite Arroitajauregi and Aránzazu Calleja
2020 (35th)	Adú		Roque Baños
2020 (35th)	Baby		Bingen Mendizabal and Koldo Uriarte
2020 (35th)	The Summer We Lived	El verano que vivimos	Federico Jusid
2021 (36th)	The Good Boss	El buen patrón	Zeltia Montes
2021 (36th)	The Grandmother	La abuela	Fatima Al Qadiri
2021 (36th)	Maixabel		Alberto Iglesias
2021 (36th)	Mediterraneo: The Law of the Sea	Mediterráneo	Arnau Bataller
2022 (37th)	The Beasts	As bestas	Olivier Arson
2022 (37th)	Irati		Aránzazu Calleja, Maite Arroitajauregi
2022 (37th)	Dancing on Glass	Las niñas de cristal	Iván Palomares
2022 (37th)	God's Crooked Lines	Los renglones torcidos de Dios	Fernando Velázquez
2022 (37th)	Prison 77	Modelo 77	Julio de la Rosa
2023 (38th)	Society of the Snow	La sociedad de la nieve	Michael Giacchino
2023 (38th)	The Teacher Who Promised the Sea	El maestro que prometió el mar	Natasha Arizu
2023 (38th)	The Antares Paradox	La paradoja de Antares	Arnau Bataller
2023 (38th)	Robot Dreams		Alfonso de Vilallonga
2023 (38th)	Jokes & Cigarettes	Saben aquell	Andrea Motis
2024 (39th)	The Room Next Door	La habitación de al lado	Alberto Iglesias
2024 (39th)	The 47	El 47	Arnau Bataller
2024 (39th)	Dragonkeeper	Dragonkeeper: Guardiana de dragones	Arturo Cardelús
2024 (39th)	Undercover	La infiltrada	Fernando Velázquez
2024 (39th)	Family Affairs	Verano en diciembre	Sergio de la Puente
2025 (40th)	Sirāt		Kangding Ray
2025 (40th)	The Talent	El talento	Carla F. Benedicto
2025 (40th)	Leo & Lou		Iván Palomares de la Encina
2025 (40th)	Los Tigres		Julio de la Rosa
2025 (40th)	Maspalomas		Aránzazu Calleja

== See also ==
- List of film music awards § Best score
