= The Love of Captain Brando =

1974 film

- Theatrical release poster
- Spanish: El amor del capitán Brando
- Directed by: Jaime de Armiñán
- Written by: Jaime de Armiñán; Juan Tébar
- Starring: Ana Belén; Fernando Fernán Gómez; Jaime Gamboa
- Cinematography: Luis Cuadrado
- Edited by: José Luis Matesanz
- Music by: José Nieto
- Distributed by: Incine
- Release date: 21 June 1974
- Running time: 93 minutes
- Country: Spain
- Language: Spanish
- Box office: 141.3 million pesetas

The Love of Captain Brando (Spanish: El amor del capitán Brando) is a 1974 Spanish drama film written and directed by Jaime de Armiñán, starring Ana Belén, Fernando Fernán Gómez, and Jaime Gamboa.

The film was a critical and commercial success and was one of the highest-grossing Spanish films at the time.

== Plot ==
The film follows the relationship of Aurora, a young school teacher, with two men of opposite generations who fall in love with her: Fernando, a middle age republican exile, and Juan, a thirteen-year-old boy who enjoys playing acting in Westerns, and his imitation of Marlon Brando gives the film its title.

== Cast ==
- Ana Belén as Aurora
- Fernando Fernán Gómez as Fernando
- Jaime Gamboa as Juan
- Antonio Ferrandis as The major
- Amparo Soler Leal as Amparo, Juan mother
- Verónica Llimera as Kety, Juan aunt
- Chus Lampreave as Doña Concha, the major's wife
- Julieta Serrano as Maria Rosa
- Fernando Marín as Panta
- Pilar Muñoz as Sebas
- Eduardo Calvo as the major secretary
- Julia Lorente as Visitación
- Aurora Marquez as Alicia

== Production ==
The film was shot in Pedraza, in the province of Segovia, renamed Trescabañas in the film.

== Release ==
The film was released theatrically in Spain on 21 June 1974. It was also entered into the 24th Berlin International Film Festival.

== Reception ==
By the end of 1975, the film had grossed 122.4 million ₧, which made it the second highest-grossing Spanish film of all time behind Poachers, released in September 1975, with 130 million. By 1988, the film had grossed 141.3 million pesetas. The film won the audience award at the Berlin International Film Festival.

== See also ==
- List of Spanish films of 1974

== Bibliography ==
- Deveney, Thomas G: Cain on Screen: Contemporary Spanish Cinema, The Scarecrow Press, 1993, ISBN 0-8108-2707-7
