= Punishment without Revenge =

Play written by Lope de Vega

Punishment without Vengeance (Castigo sin venganza) is a 1631 tragedy written by the Spanish playwright Lope de Vega at the age of 68, centred on adultery and a near-incestuous relationship between step-mother and step-son. The play is regarded as one of Lope’s supreme achievements.

== Sources ==
Federico's servant Batin closes the play with a comic line, noting that it was based on a true story in Italy – this refers to an event in 1425 under Niccolò III d'Este. De Vega also works in aspects of the story of King David as well as using the 208 novellas of Matteo Bandello (78 of these were translated into French by Boisteau and Belleforest and later into Spanish, in a first edition published in Salamanca in 1589). It may also allude to Philip II of Spain's marriage to his third wife Elisabeth of Valois in 1559 and problems with his first son Carlos, Prince of Asturias. In the view of the play's translator and editor Gwynne Edwards: "The relationship in the play between Casandra, the Duke's wife, and his son Federico was not unlike that between Prince Carlos, son of Philip II, and Isabel [Elisabeth] who became Philip's wife and Carlos's stepmother"; Edwards argues that these events were recent enough to have embarrassed the court of Philip IV and may have been a reason for the play's withdrawal after one performance.

== Plot ==
Known for his adulterous and licentious lifestyle, the Duke of Ferrara is convinced to disinherit his illegitimate son and heir Count Federico and to marry in order to produce a legitimate heir. He sends Federico to meet his intended bride, Cassandra. Federico rescues her when her carriage gets stuck in a river ford and he falls in love with her. In the meantime, the Duke agrees to his niece Aurora that she may marry Federico to guarantee his position at court.

Federico tries to conceal his love and puts off the marriage to Aurora, so she encourages the advances of Gonzaga, who had accompanied Cassandra to the Ferrara court. Cassandra is also unhappy, since the Duke is still following his dissolute lifestyle. The Duke leaves to fight for the Pope, leaving Federico as regent in his absence. Federico and Cassandra admit to their love for one another and consummate it, but are unknowingly witnessed in a mirror by Aurora.

The Duke returns suddenly from the wars, now a reformed man. He receives an anonymous letter revealing the affair between his wife and son, but refuses to believe it until he sees them embracing. He decides he cannot punish them in public, since this will damage his honour, so he decides to cloak their punishment as a political murder. To achieve this, he ties up Cassandra in a room, gags her and wraps her in a blanket. He then tells Federico that he has discovered a nobleman plotting against him, who he has tied up and whom he wishes Federico to kill. Despite misgivings, Federico goes and does so, but the Duke calls in his courtiers, accuses Federico of deliberately killing Cassandra and has them kill Federico.

== Production history ==
=== Spain ===
- Teatro Español, Madrid, 1919.
  - Cast: Carmen Ruiz Moragas, Francisco Fuentes, Ricardo Calvo, Carmen Seco, Emilio Mesejo.
- Teatro Español, Madrid, 1943.
  - Design: Emilio Burgos.
  - Cast: Mercedes Prendes, Alfonso Muñoz, José María Seoane, Porfiria Sanchís, Julia Delgado Caro, Gonzalo Llorens.
- Teatro Español, Barcelona, 1968.
  - Cast: Gemma Cuervo, Luis Prendes, Fernando Guillén.
- Varias localidades, 1980.
  - Cast: Carmen de la Maza.
- Teatro Español, Madrid, 1985.
  - Director: Miguel Narros.
  - Cast: Juan Ribó, Ana Marzoa, Inma de Santis, José Luis Pellicena, Tito Valverde, Miguel Ayones, Paca Gabaldón, Claudia Gravy, Francisco Vidal.
- Teatro Pavón, Madrid, 2005.
  - Director: Eduardo Vasco.
  - Cast: Marcial Álvarez, Clara Sanchís.
- Teatros del Canal, Madrid.
  - Cast: Gerardo Malla, Lidia Otón.
- Teatro de la Comedia, Madrid, 2018.
  - Director: Helena Pimenta.
  - Cast: Beatriz Argüello, Lola Baldrich, Rafa Castejón, Carlos Chamarro, Nuria Gallardo, Joaquín Notario, Íñigo Álvarez de Lara, Javier Collado, Fernando Trujillo, Alejandro Pau, Anna Maruny.

=== United Kingdom ===
The play was produced twice in Britain in 2014. The first production was at the Theatre Royal Bath and Arcola Theatre (translated by Meredith Oakes, directed by Laurence Boswell). The second was in the original language by Fundaciόn Siglo de Oro (formerly Rakatá) at Shakespeare's Globe from 1 to 6 September 2014 – this was the first Spanish Golden Age play to appear at that venue. The production was recorded on video and made available for streaming.

== Bibliography ==
=== Texts ===
- Spanish Wikisource has original text related to this article: El castigo sin venganza
- (in Spanish) de Vega, Lope (1993). Antonio Carreño, ed. El castigo sin venganza (2ª edición). Madrid: Cátedra.

=== Criticism ===
- (in Spanish) Arellano, Ignacio (2008). Historia del teatro español del siglo XVII (4ª edición). Madrid: Cátedra.
