= On the Far Side of the Tunnel =

1994 film

- Directed by: Jaime de Armiñán
- Written by: Eduardo Armiñán; Jaime de Armiñán
- Produced by: Jaime de Armiñán
- Starring: Fernando Rey
- Cinematography: Teodoro Escamilla
- Edited by: José Luis Matesanz
- Release date: 25 February 1994
- Running time: 105 minutes
- Country: Spain
- Language: Spanish

On the Far Side of the Tunnel (Spanish: Al otro lado del túnel) is a 1994 Spanish drama film directed by Jaime de Armiñán. It was entered into the 44th Berlin International Film Festival.

== Cast ==
- Rafael Alonso as Hermano Benito
- Luis Barbero as Prior
- Amparo Baró as Rosa
- Jorge Calvo as Hermano Felicísimo
- Gabriel Latorre as Hermano Ventura
- Fernando Rey as Miguel
- Susi Sánchez as Marisa
- Gonzalo Vega as Aurelio
- Maribel Verdú as Mariana
- Pedro Álvarez-Ossorio as Hermano Sinesio
