= Call Esteban =

1960 film

- Directed by: Pedro Luis Ramírez
- Written by: Vicente Coello; José Luis Colina
- Starring: Luz Márquez; José Campos; Malila Sandoval
- Cinematography: Ricardo Albiñana
- Edited by: Ramon Quadreny
- Music by: Ricardo Lamotte de Grignón
- Production company: IFI Producción S.A.
- Distributed by: IFISA
- Release date: 26 September 1960
- Running time: 79 minutes
- Country: Spain
- Language: Spanish

Call Esteban (Spanish: Llama un tal Esteban) is a 1960 Spanish crime film directed by Pedro Luis Ramírez and starring Luz Márquez, José Campos and Malila Sandoval.

== Cast ==
- Luz Márquez
- José Campos as Juan
- Malila Sandoval
- José María Caffarel
- Luis Induni as Esteban
- Estanis González
- Adrián Ortega
- Alejo del Peral as Ascensorista
- Leandro Vizcaíno
- Roberto Samsó
- Jesús Redondo
- Juanita Espín
- Joaquín Ejerique
- Pilar González
- José L. Sansalvador
- Salvador Muñoz
- Manuel Bronchud as Botones
- José Rivelles
- Lina Cuffi
- Amparo Baró
- Víctor Prades
- Carmen Expósito
- Isidro Novellas as Mecánico

== Bibliography ==
- Àngel Comas. Diccionari de llargmetratges: el cinema a Catalunya durant la Segona República, la Guerra Civil i el franquisme (1930-1975). Cossetània Edicions, 2005.
