= Divine Words =

- Spanish: Divinas palabras
- Directed by: José Luis García Sánchez
- Written by: Enrique Llovet; Diego Santillán; José Luis García Sánchez
- Based on: Divinas palabras by Ramón M.ª del Valle-Inclán
- Starring: Ana Belén; Francisco Rabal; Imanol Arias; Esperanza Roy; Aurora Bautista; Juan Echanove
- Cinematography: Fernando Arribas
- Edited by: Pablo González del Amo
- Music by: Milladoiro
- Release date: 15 September 1987
- Running time: 107 minutes
- Country: Spain
- Language: Spanish

Divine Words (Spanish: Divinas palabras) is a 1987 Spanish film directed by José Luis García Sánchez. It stars Ana Belén, Francisco Rabal and Imanol Arias. The film is based upon the play by Ramón del Valle-Inclán. A Mexican adaptation was released in 1977.

== Plot ==
The setting of the film is the province of Galicia, circa, 1920, in the impoverished village of San Clemente. Since the Village has no priest, ecclesiastic authority falls to Pedro Gailo, the sacristan, who has a young beautiful wife Mari Gaila. Greedy for any money that comes their way and eager to leave San Clemente and her husband, Mari cares for a hydrocephalus-stricken child and uses him to beg for alms. The child becomes the source of their wealth.

Comfortable in the joint guardianship of the child with her sister-in-law Marica, Mari Gaila, encouraged by another beggar woman nicknamed “la Tatula’, decides to go to various fairs and festivals and there puts the hydrocephalus dwarf on display, in order to wheedle funds from good-natured, pitying, sympathetic people. Her husband, Pedro, the sacristan, is afraid that Mari’s activities will ruin his reputation, but his love of money overcomes his fear and pride. Maria Galia sets out for the nearest city, confronting a world she never knew existed, full of music, cattle trading fairs and picturesque people. She becomes the object of desire of other nomad beggars like herself, especially shrewd tricksters like Septimio Miau.

Drawn sexually to this handsome outlaw, after a mild flirtation with him she leaves for home, loaded with money. The townspeople begin to gossip about her sudden wealth and freedom to leave the village at will. Mari Gaila meets up with Septimo again, teams up with him, using the hydrocephalus child as a freak exhibit, and decides to run off with him. While they are making love, the locals ply the hydrocephalus child with liquor at the local tavern, causing his death.

Septimo deserts Mari Gaila, who becomes ill and returns to the sacristan, empty handed. But Pedro Gailo uses his nephew’s corpse, showing off his gigantic member to families in other villages to make money. Later, Septimo returns and Rosa la Tatula acts as a go between. The lovers meet in a forest, consummate their affair and are caught by their jealous neighbors.

Disgraced, desperate and poor, Mari Gaila is stripped nude, spat upon, mocked and stoned. The crowd ends its vengeance when Pedro, the sacristan, pronounces the “divine words" in Latin: “Let him who is free of sin cast the first stone”. These words in the midst of such squalor are ironic yet miraculous, causing the crowd to disperse and look into their own motives. They are downtrodden peasants caught in a claustrophobic world, scheming, dirty people with nowhere to go.

After the crowd leaves, Pedro maintains a saintly pose, forgiving his adulterous wife. Mari Gaila seems too clean and noble to have groveled in this squalor and comes off seeming almost saintly herself.

== Cast ==
- Ana Belén as Mari Gaila
- Paco Rabal as Pedro Gailo
- Imanol Arias as Séptimo Miau
- Esperanza Roy as Rosa, la Tatula
- Aurora Bautista as Marica del reino
- Juan Echanove as Miguelín, el padrones

== Release ==
The film was released theatrically in Spain on 15 September 1987.

== Accolades ==
Year	Award	Category	Nominee(s)	Result	Ref.
1988	2nd Goya Awards	Best Film		Nominated	
1988	2nd Goya Awards	Best Supporting Actor	Juan Echanove	Won	
1988	2nd Goya Awards	Best Cinematography	Fernando Arribas	Won	
1988	2nd Goya Awards	Best Editing	Pablo del Amo	Won	
1988	2nd Goya Awards	Best Original Score	Grupo Milladoiro	Nominated	
1988	2nd Goya Awards	Best Sound	Miguel Ángel Polo, Enrique Molinero	Won	

== See also ==
- List of Spanish films of 1987
