= Canciones para después de una guerra =

- Directed by: Basilio Martín Patino
- Written by: Basilio Martín Patino
- Music by: Manuel Parada
- Release date: 1976
- Running time: 115 minutes
- Country: Spain
- Language: Spanish

Canciones para después de una guerra ("Songs for after a war") is a 1971 Spanish documentary film directed and written by Basilio Martín Patino based on post-Spanish Civil War Spain. It was done in secret in 1971 and was not released until 1976, shortly after the death of Francisco Franco.

== Description ==
The film consists on a series of archival footage, all previously approved by the Francoist censorship, with popular songs of the time that give a second meaning, often satirical, to what is displayed.
