= Los invitados =

- Directed by: Víctor Barrera
- Screenplay by: Víctor Barrera
- Based on: Los invitados by Alfonso Grosso
- Starring: Amparo Muñoz; Pablo Carbonell; Raúl Fraire; Lola Flores; Pedro Reyes; Sonia Martínez; Idilio Cardoso; Antonio Somoza
- Cinematography: José G. Galisteo
- Edited by: María Luisa Soriano
- Music by: Raúl Alcover
- Production companies: Víctor Barrera PC; Impala
- Distributed by: Warner Española
- Release date: 5 March 1987 (Cine Rialto)
- Country: Spain
- Language: Spanish

Los invitados is a 1987 Spanish crime drama film written and directed by Víctor Barrera based on the novel by Alfonso Grosso. It stars Amparo Muñoz, Pablo Carbonell, Raúl Fraire, and Lola Flores.

== Plot ==
An Englishman persuades the overseer of a cortijo in Carmona to develop a cannabis plantation in the rural estate. The overseer's wife, corroded by guilt, convinces her husband to set the plantation on fire.

== Cast ==
- Amparo Muñoz as La Catalana
- Pablo Carbonell as Tony Mackenzie
- Raúl Fraire as El Capataz
- Pedro Reyes as El Canijo
- Sonia Martínez as Beatriz
- Idilio Cardoso as Pedro
- Antonio Somoza as Ferreira
- María Luisa Borruel as María
- Lola Flores as La Capataza

== Production ==
The film is based on the 1978 novel by Alfonso Grosso which is in turn based on the true-life Los Galindos crimes, consisting on a mass-murder in a cortijo. It is a Víctor Barrera PC and Impala production.

== Release ==
Distributed by Warner Española, the film premiered on 5 March 1987 at Cine Rialto of Madrid. The neighbors of Paradas (the site of the original mass murder of Los Galindos) decried the film and asked for it to be withdrawn of exhibition. The sister of one of the murdered people in the crime of Los Galindos filed criminal charges against the director on the basis of alleged slander or defamation against her brother's memory. It had 165,378 admissions.

== Accolades ==
Year	Award	Category	Nominee(s)	Result	Ref.
1988	2nd Goya Awards	Best Original Score	Raúl Alcover	Nominated	

== See also ==
- List of Spanish films of 1987
