= The House of Bernarda Alba (1987 film) =

1987 film

- Theatrical release poster
- Spanish: La casa de Bernarda Alba
- Directed by: Mario Camus
- Screenplay by: Mario Camus; Antonio Larreta
- Based on: The House of Bernarda Alba (play) by Federico García Lorca
- Produced by: Jaime Borrell
- Starring: Irene Gutiérrez Caba; Florinda Chico; Enriqueta Carballeira; Victoria Peña; Aurora Pastor; Mercedes Lezcano; Ana Belén
- Cinematography: Fernando Arribas
- Edited by: José María Biurrún
- Release date: 3 April 1987
- Running time: 99 minutes
- Country: Spain
- Language: Spanish
- Budget: 154 million ₧

The House of Bernarda Alba (Spanish: La casa de Bernarda Alba) is a 1987 Spanish drama film directed by Mario Camus. It was screened in the Un Certain Regard section at the 1987 Cannes Film Festival and in the main competition at the 15th Moscow International Film Festival. It is based on the play of the same name by Federico García Lorca.

Filming locations included Madrid and Antequera.

== Cast ==
- Irene Gutiérrez Caba as Bernarda Alba
- Ana Belén as Adela
- Florinda Chico as Poncia
- Enriqueta Carballeira as Angustias
- Victoria Peña as Martirio
- Aurora Pastor as Magdalena
- Mercedes Lezcano as Amelia
- Pilar Puchol as criada
- Ana María Ventura as Prudencia
- Paula Borrell as muchacha
- Álvaro Quiroga as Pepe el romano
- Fernanda de Utrera (voice)

== Accolades ==
Year	Award	Category	Nominee(s)	Result	Ref.
1988	2nd Goya Awards	Best Actress	Irene Gutiérrez Caba	Nominated	
1988	2nd Goya Awards	Best Art Direction	Rafael Palmero	Won	
1988	2nd Goya Awards	Best Costume Design	José Rubio	Nominated	

== See also ==
- List of Spanish films of 1987
