= La descarriada =

1972 film by Mariano Ozores

- Directed by: Mariano Ozores
- Written by: Mariano Ozores
- Produced by: José Antonio Cascales
- Starring: Florinda Chico; Rafaela Aparicio; Laly Soldevila; Antonio Ferrandis; Pilar Bardem; Rogelio Madrid; María Álvarez
- Cinematography: Vicente Minaya
- Edited by: Antonio Ramírez de Loaysa
- Music by: Fernando García Morcillo
- Production company: Producciones Internacionales Cinematográficas Asociadas
- Distributed by: Belén Films; Divisa Home Video
- Release date: 12 February 1973 (Spain)
- Running time: 88 min
- Country: Spain

La descarriada (translation: The Wayward Ones) is a 1973 Spanish comedy film directed by Mariano Ozores and starring Antonio Ozores, Florinda Chico, Lina Morgan and Rafaela Aparicio.

== Cast ==
- Lina Morgan as Nati García
- Antonio Ozores as Nicolás
- Florinda Chico as Angustias
- Rafaela Aparicio as Rosaura
- Laly Soldevila as Marga
- Antonio Ferrandis as Padre de Ángela
- Pilar Bardem as Lucila
- Rogelio Madrid as Vicente Aguirre
- María Álvarez
- María Ángeles Olazábal as Ángela
- Adoración Vázquez
- Luis Rico
- Rufino Inglés
- Luis Barbero as Vendedor de aspiradoras eléctricas
- Marisa Tovar
- Carlos Coque as Enrique
- Belén Cristino as Matilde
- Jorge Matamoros as Julio
- José Luis López Vázquez as Florencio
