= Islands (2025 Spanish film) =

- Theatrical release poster
- Spanish: Islas
- Directed by: Marina Seresesky
- Screenplay by: Marina Seresesky
- Produced by: Frank Ariza
- Starring: Ana Belén; Manu Vega; Jorge Usón; Eva Llorach
- Cinematography: Kenneth Oribe
- Edited by: Irene Blecua
- Production companies: E-media Canary; AF Films; Meridional Producciones; Match Point; BTF Media
- Distributed by: AF Pictures
- Release dates: November 2025 (Seville); 27 February 2026 (Spain)
- Running time: 89 minutes
- Country: Spain
- Language: Spanish

Islands (Spanish: Islas) is a 2025 Spanish drama film written and directed by Marina Seresesky. It stars Ana Belén and Manu Vega.

== Plot ==
Amparo, a diva set to commit suicide in a decadent hotel in Tenerife, comes across a 20-year-old man willing to do the same, and after she rescues him, they bond and get to know each other's vulnerabilities.

== Cast ==
- Ana Belén as Amparo Lamar
- Manu Vega as Toni
- Eva Llorach as Britt
- Jorge Usón

== Production ==
The film was produced by E-media Canary alongside AF Films, Meridional Producciones, Match Point and BTF Media. It was shot in Tenerife.

== Release ==
The film was presented in an out-of-competition official selection slot of the 22nd Seville European Film Festival in November 2025. Distributed by AF Pictures, it was released theatrically in Spain on 27 February 2026.

== Reception ==
Alfonso Rivera of Cineuropa wrote that the best thing about the film "lies in watching a radiant, uninhibited Ana Belén morph into a Spanish Norma Desmond, appealing – like Blanche DuBois in A Streetcar Named Desire – to 'the kindness of strangers'".

Javier Ocaña of El País lamented that Islands "does not go beyond a flawed good idea", while it "lacks freshness and has too much impostured density".

Toni Vall of Cinemanía rated the film 4 out of 5 stars, rejoicing with the film return of Ana Belén and welcoming "more films like this, strange, imperfect, with a heartbeat."

Pablo Vázquez of Fotogramas rated Islands 3 out of 5 stars, mentioning the Ana Belén's return as the best thing about the film while citing Vega's somewhat cliché character as the worst thing about it.

Oti Rodríguez Marchante of ABC gave the film a 2-star rating, writing neither Seresesky's direction nor writing ever quite manage "to strike the right balance between comedy and drama".

== See also ==
- List of Spanish films of 2026
