= The Enchanted Forest (1987 film) =

- Theatrical release poster
- Spanish: El bosque animado
- Directed by: José Luis Cuerda
- Screenplay by: Rafael Azcona
- Produced by: Eduardo Ducay
- Starring: Alfredo Landa; Tito Valverde; Alejandra Grepi; Miguel Rellán
- Cinematography: Javier Aguirresarobe
- Edited by: Juan Ignacio San Mateo
- Music by: José Nieto
- Production company: Classic Films
- Release date: 2 October 1987
- Running time: 103 minutes
- Country: Spain
- Language: Spanish

The Enchanted Forest (Spanish: El bosque animado) is a 1987 Spanish comedy-fantasy film directed by José Luis Cuerda. Rafael Azcona wrote the screenplay, based on the homonymous novel written by Wenceslao Fernández Flórez. The film has a large ensemble cast headed by Alfredo Landa. It was a critical success winning five Goya Awards including Best Film and Best Actor.

== Plot ==
The film shows the adventures of the human inhabitants of the shrubland of Cecebre and how their paths cross over under the shelter of a lively forest where animals, people and plants form a harmonious system. It notably tells the misfortunes of Malvís, a farmhand sick of the shortages of his trade, who decides to become a bandit and hides in the shrubland under the alias Fendetestas, and who is joined by a kid as an apprentice, Fuco; of Geraldo, a well-digger who lost a leg while whale hunting and is in love with Hermelinda, who is leaving to the city fed up with her aunt; of the lost soul of Fiz de Cotovelo, damned to follow the procession of spirits; and of the D'Abondo family, the lords and ladies of the parroquia, among other characters.

== Cast ==
- Alfredo Landa as Malvís / Bandido Fendetestas
- Tito Valverde as Geraldo
- Alejandra Grepi as Hermelinda
- Miguel Rellán as Fiz de Cotovelo
- Alicia Hermida as Gloria Roade
- Amparo Baró as Amelia Roade
- Fernando Rey as Sr. D'Abondo
- Manuel Alexandre as Roque Freire
- Encarna Paso as Juanita Arruallo
- María Isbert as Moucha
- Antonio Gamero as Civil Guard corporal
- Paca Gabaldón as Sra. D'Abondo
- Luis Ciges as Loco de Vos

== Release ==
The film was theatrically released on 2 October 1987.

== Accolades ==
| Year | Award | Category | Nominee(s) | Result | Ref. |
|---|---|---|---|---|---|
| 1988 | 2nd Goya Awards | Best Film | | Won | |
| 1988 | 2nd Goya Awards | Best Screenplay | Rafael Azcona | Won | |
| 1988 | 2nd Goya Awards | Best Actor | Alfredo Landa | Won | |
| 1988 | 2nd Goya Awards | Best Original Score | José Nieto | Won | |
| 1988 | 2nd Goya Awards | Best Art Direction | Félix Murcia | Nominated | |
| 1988 | 2nd Goya Awards | Best Cinematography | Javier Aguirresarobe | Nominated | |
| 1988 | 2nd Goya Awards | Best Costume Design | Javier Artiñano | Won | |
| 1988 | 2nd Goya Awards | Best Sound | Bernardo Menz, Enrique Molinero | Nominated | |

== See also ==
- List of Spanish films of 1987
