= Carola de día, Carola de noche =

- Directed by: Jaime de Armiñán
- Written by: Jaime de Armiñán, Leo Anchóriz
- Produced by: Manuel Goyanes
- Release date: 1969
- Running time: 90 min
- Country: Spain
- Language: Spanish

Carola de día, Carola de noche (lit. 'Carola by day, Carola by night') is a 1969 Spanish musical film starring Marisol. The film was written by Jaime de Armiñán and Leo Anchóriz and directed by the former.

== Background ==
It was Jaime de Armiñán's first work as a director. He had already been a successful playwright and screenwriter, but this time he did not only write the script, but directed the movie himself.

== Plot ==
Marisol plays young and beautiful princess Carola Jungbunzlav, the heir to the throne of a strange faraway country. One day, a revolution happens there. To save her life, she has to flee and find refuge abroad – in Barcelona, Spain. Threatened by assassination, she has to disguise herself and maintain anonymity and is constantly guarded and watched by her faithful servants. She gets bored of confinement and tired of her demanding high position. One night, she sneaks out to see how common people live outside. (Note: Sources: Film itself)

== Cast ==
- Marisol as Carola Jungbunzlav
- Tony Isbert as Daniel Rey
