= Basilio Martín Patino =

Spanish film director

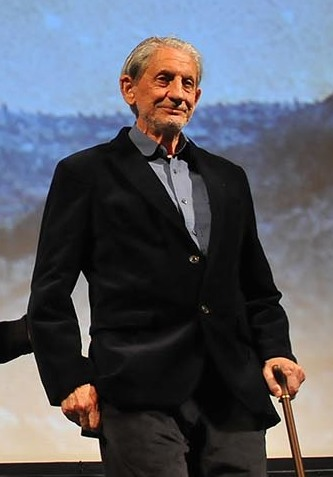
- Born: 29 October 1930; Lumbrales, Salamanca Province, Spain
- Died: 13 August 2017 (aged 86); Madrid, Spain
- Occupation: Film director

Basilio Martín Patino (29 October 1930 – 13 August 2017) was a Spanish film director, specializing in a creative approach to documentary works. Patino produced pieces on the Spanish Civil War (Canciones para después de una guerra), the famous dictator (Caudillo), or his executioners (Queridísimos verdugos). He also produced fiction (Nueve cartas a Berta, Octavia). Patino often experimented with new technologies, including digital tools, 3D, and offline editing.

In 1977, he was a member of the jury at the 27th Berlin International Film Festival. In 2005, he received the Gold Medal from the Spanish Academy of Cinema.

== Biography ==
Basilio Martín Patino was born on 29 October 1930 in Lumbrales, a small rural town of Salamanca Province, Castile and León in Spain. He is son of Catholic professors and the younger brother of the well-known priest José María Martín Patino. He studied Philosophy and Letters at University of Salamanca, where he founded the university cinema club. In 1955 he organized the celebrated Conversaciones de Salamanca, the first critical analysis of Spanish cinema, and he later moved to Madrid and enrolled in film school after graduating from university. He graduated from film school Escuela Oficial de Cine en Madrid in 1961 and soon after was met with censorship for his first short film, Torerillos (1963).

== Film career ==
His debut with the feature film Nueve cartas a Berta (Nine Letters to Bertha, 1966), starring Emilio Gutiérrez Caba and Elsa Baeza, won the Silver Shell at the San Sebastián International Film Festival. The film is a key piece in the so-called "New Spanish Cinema", however, had to wait three years for its commercial release.

In 1969 he shot "Del amor y otras soledades", mutilated by censorship, and in 1971 "Canciones para después de una guerra", a singular and moving critical radiography of the post-war period, which also suffered censorship for five years.

In response, Martín Patino filmed "Querídisimos verdugos" (1973) and "Caudillo" (1977) in hiding. Caudillo is a documentary film that follows the military and political career of Francisco Franco and the most important moments of the Spanish Civil War. It uses footage from both sides of the war, music from the period and voice-over testimonies of various people.

With the advent of democracy, the filmmaker founded his production company, La linterna mágica, from which he has alternated his fiction and documentary work with titles such as The Lost Paradise ("Los paraísos perdidos", 1985) screened at the 42nd Venice International Film Festival, "Madrid" (1987) and " Octavia" (2002).

His production, although it has spread over time, has received tributes and has been the material for studies and cycles, such as the one dedicated to him by the Pompidou Center within a space dedicated to Spanish documentary, or the tribute paid in May 2005 by Documenta Madrid to someone considered one of the best Spanish documentary filmmakers.

The Spanish Academy of Cinematographic Arts and Sciences awarded the 2005 Gold Medal to the director, writer and researcher Basilio Martín Patino, whose work "represents the enduring values of the commitment to intelligent, complex cinema immersed in reality and evolution of a country"

In 2012, he made his last film, the documentary film Libre te quiero (2012) about the camp of the 15-M movement in Madrid.

An example of an independent filmmaker, Martín Patino contributed several titles to Spanish cinematography. Behind his professional manner and quiet nature was a focused approach to producing films outside of the mainstream industry and commercial interests. He died in Madrid at the age of 86 following a degenerative disease.

== Filmography ==
- El noveno (1960)
- Torerillos, 61 (1962)
- Nueve cartas a Berta (1966)
- Love and Other Solitudes (1969)
- Paseo por los letreros de Madrid (1968) with J. L. García Sánchez
- Canciones para después de una guerra (1971)
- Queridísimos verdugos (1973)
- Caudillo (1974)
- Hombre y Ciudad (1980)
- Retablo de la Guerra Civil Española (1980)
- Inquisición y Libertad (1982) with J. L. García Sánchez
- El Nacimiento de un Nuevo Mundo (1982) with J. L. García Sánchez
- El Horizonte Ibérico (1983) with Elbia Álvarez
- La Nueva Ilustración Española (1983) with J. L. García Sánchez
- Los paraísos perdidos (1985)
- Madrid (1987)
- Octavia (2002)
- Homenaje a Madrid (2004)
- Corredores de fondo (2005)
- Fiesta (2005)
- Capea (2005)
- Libre te quiero (2012)

== Bibliography ==
- Bentley, Bernard. A Companion to Spanish Cinema. Boydell & Brewer 2008.
- García Martínez, Alberto Nahum (2005). Realidad y representación en el cine de Basilio Martín Patino. Montaje, falsificación, metaficción y ensayo (PDF). doi:10.13140/RG.2.1.1692.4401.
- Heredero, Carlos F. (2018). "Basilio Martín Patino. El poder de imaginar lo real". Patino/Birri. Estrategias frente a lo real (PDF). Málaga: Festival de Cine de Málaga e Iniciativas Audiovisuales, S.A. ISBN 978-84-09-00899-5.
- Naharro-Calderón, José María (2012). "Entre la mneme de En el balcón vacío y la anamnesis de Tiempo de llorar". In Lluch-Prats, Javier (ed.). En el balcón vacío. La segunda generación del exilio republicano en México (PDF). Madrid: AEMIC. ISBN 978-84-616-0199-8.
- Pavlović, Tatjana (2008). "Los paraísos perdidos: Cinema of Return and Repetition (Basilio Martín Patino, 1985)". In Resina, Joan Ramon (ed.). Burning Darkness. A Half Century of Spanish Cinema. State University of New York Press. pp. 105–124. ISBN 978-0-7914-7503-4.
