= Caudillo (film) =

1974 Spanish documentary film

- DVD cover
- Directed by: Basilio Martín Patino
- Written by: Basilio Martín Patino
- Produced by: Retasa
- Starring: Francisco Franco
- Narrated by: Héctor Alterio
- Release date: 1974
- Running time: 105 minutes
- Country: Spain
- Language: Spanish

Caudillo is a documentary film by Spanish film director Basilio Martín Patino. It follows the military and political career of Francisco Franco and the most important moments of the Spanish Civil War. It uses footage from both sides of the war, music from the period and voice-over testimonies of various people.
