= Florinda Chico =

Spanish actress (1926–2011)

The Most Excellent Florinda Chico
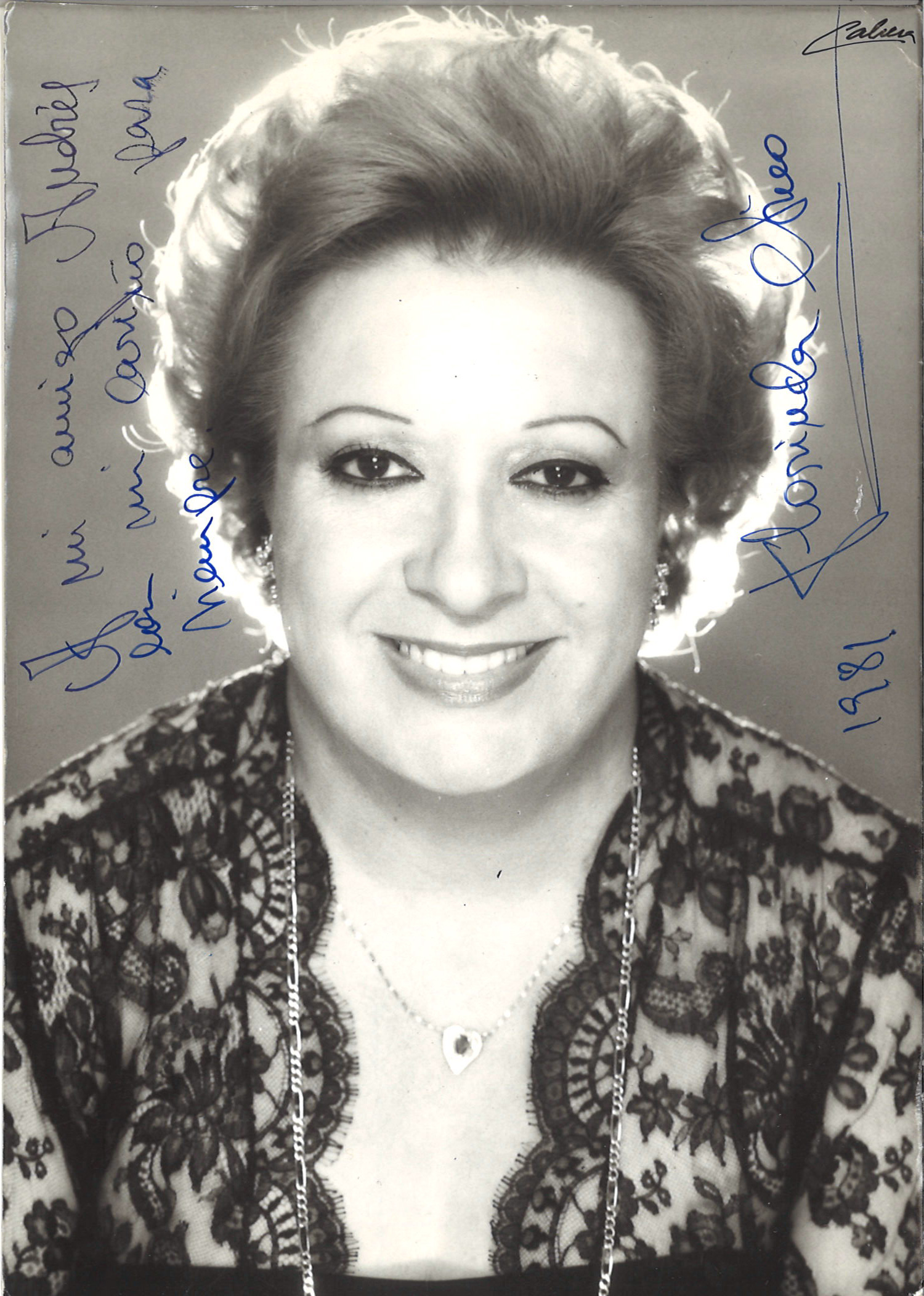
- Born: Florinda Chico Martín-Mora; 24 April 1926; Don Benito (Badajoz), Spain
- Died: 19 February 2011 (aged 84); Madrid, Spain
- Occupation: Actress
- Years active: 1947–2002

Florinda Chico Martín-Mora (24 April 1926 – 19 February 2011) was a Spanish actress of film, theater and television.

== Biography ==
Florinda Chico Martín-Mora was born in 1926 in Don Benito (Badajoz) in Extremadura, Spain. She studied singing and then started her artistic career on the stage acting in musical revues. Her first successes were El huevo and the revue La blanca doble (1947) with the comedian trio Zori, Santos y Codeso. Although she made her debut on cinema in 1953 with the movie Pasaporte para un ángel it wasn't until the late 1960s that she became famous in Spain.

She often played the roles of feisty, fleshy housewife or grumpy maid. She worked with director Mariano Ozores in almost two dozen films. She also appeared in such dramas as Cría cuervos (1976) and La casa de Bernarda Alba (1987).

She was also a regular on such television series as La tía de Ambrosio (1971), Los maniáticos (1974), Este señor de negro (1975–76), de Antonio Mercero, Taller mecánico (1991), El sexólogo (1994), Makinavaja (1995–96) and La casa de los líos (1996–2000). In the 1980s she appeared in the theater play Mi tía y sus cosas.

Florinda died on 19 February 2011 in Madrid at age 84 of a strong respiratory disease.

== Selected filmography ==
=== Films ===
- 1953 – Plot on the Stage
- 1972 – En un mundo nuevo
- 1973 – La descarriada as Angustias
- 1975 – Unmarried Mothers
- 1976 – Cría cuervos
- 1980 – Y al tercer año, resucitó
- 1980 – Spoiled Children
- 1987 – La casa de Bernarda Alba as Poncia
- 1988 – Jarrapellejos

== Honours ==
- Gold Medal of Merit in Labour (Kingdom of Spain, 19 December 1997).
