= Emilio Gutiérrez Caba =

Spanish film and television actor (born 1942)

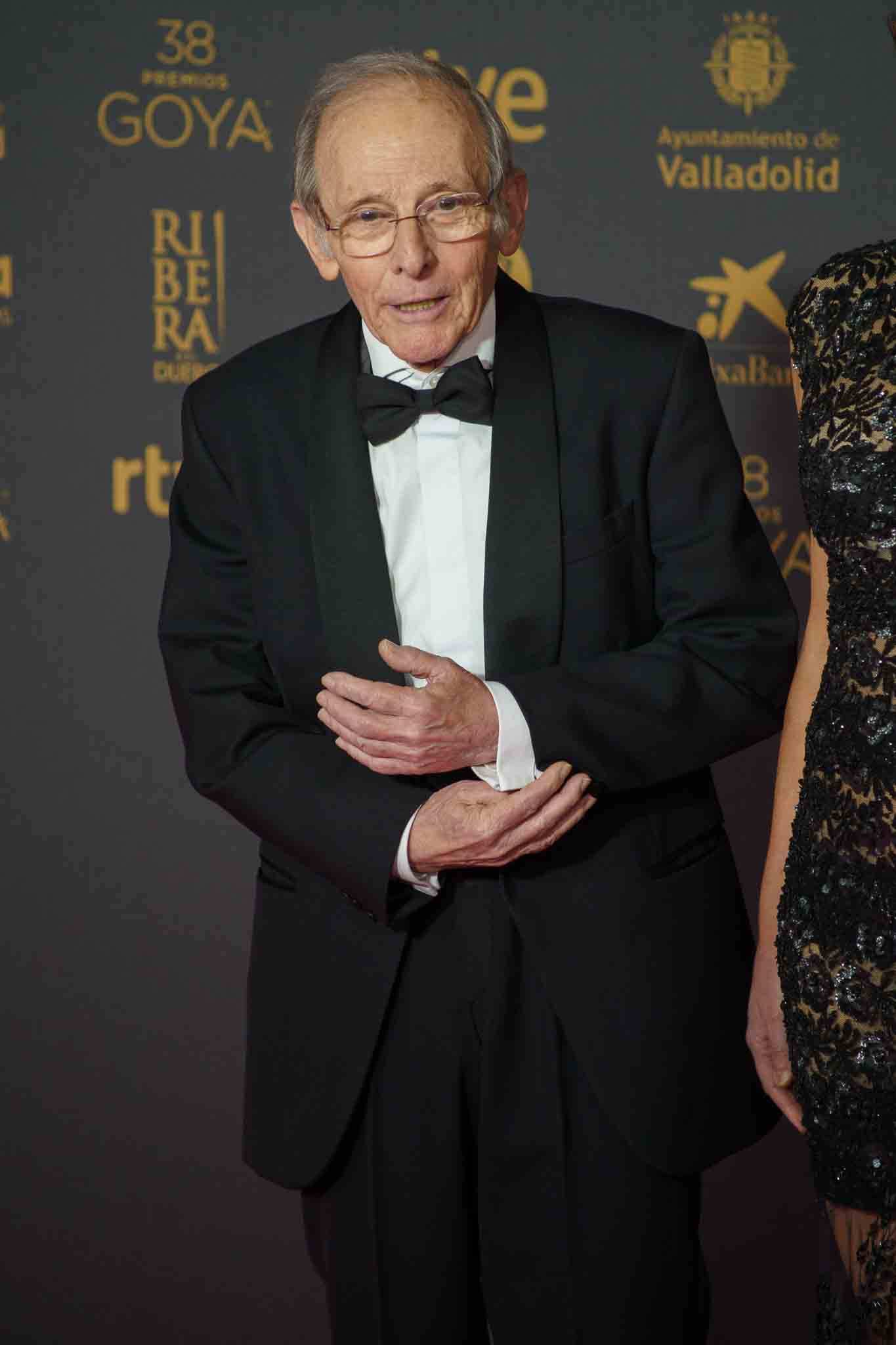
- Gutiérrez Caba in 2024
- Born: Emilio Gutiérrez Caba; 26 September 1942 (age 83); Valladolid, Spain
- Mother: Irene Caba Alba
- Relatives: Julia Caba Alba (aunt); Julia Gutiérrez Caba (sister); Irene Escolar (grandniece)

Emilio Gutiérrez Caba (born 26 September 1942) is a Spanish film and television actor.

== Personal ==
Caba is the son of actors Emilio Gutiérrez and Irene Caba Alba and the brother of Irene and Julia, both dedicated to acting too. From his mother's side, he is the grandson of actress Irene Alba and the great-grandson of actor Pascual Alba Sors. He is the nephew of actress Julia Caba Alba and the granduncle of actress Irene Escolar. He was born on 26 September 1942 at Valladolid's Calle Platerías while his parents were on tour, moving to Madrid three days later. He studied philosophy and began acting while at university.

Following a stage debut in 1962, he made his feature film debut in Jess Franco's El llanero (1963).

== Awards ==
He has won two Goya Awards as Best Supporting Actor for his roles in La comunidad and El cielo abierto.

== Selected filmography ==
=== Film ===
Year	Title	Role	Notes	Ref
1963	El llanero		Feature film debut	
1965	Nueve cartas a Berta (Nine Letters to Berta)	Lorenzo		
1966	La caza (The Hunt)	Enrique		
1976	La petición (The Request)	Miguel		
1978	Al servicio de la mujer española (At the Service of Spanish Womanhood)	Manolo		
1982	La colmena (The Beehive)	Ventura Aguado		
1985	Réquiem por un campesino español			
1984	Las bicicletas son para el verano			
1984	¿Qué he hecho yo para merecer esto? (What Have I Done to Deserve This?)			
1986	Werther			
1987	Cara de acelga (Turnip Top)	Eusebio		
1987	La guerra de los locos (The War of the Madmen)	Comandante		
1990	La sombra del ciprés es alargada			
1998	La primera noche de mi vida (The First Night of My Life)	Padre		
1999	Goya en Burdeos (Goya in Bordeaux)			
2000	La comunidad	Emilio		
2001	El cielo abierto (Ten Days Without Love)	David		
2002	Reflejos (Reflections)	Lázaro		
2002	Deseo (Desire)	Rogelio		
2003	Haz conmigo lo que quieras (Kill Me Tender)	Néstor		
2009	Un buen hombre (A Good Man)	Fernando		
2011	5 metros cuadrados (Five Square Meters)	Montañés		
2024	Historias (Stories)			
