= Nine Letters to Berta =

- Theatrical release poster
- Spanish: Nueve cartas a Berta
- Directed by: Basilio Martín Patino
- Screenplay by: Basilio Martín Patino
- Starring: Mari Carrillo; Emilio G. Caba; Antonio Casas
- Cinematography: Luis Enrique Torán
- Edited by: Pedro del Rey
- Music by: Carmelo Bernaola
- Production companies: Eco Films; Transfisa
- Distributed by: Hispano Fox-Film
- Release dates: June 1966 (SSIFF); 27 February 1967 (Spain)
- Country: Spain
- Language: Spanish

Nine Letters to Berta (Spanish: Nueve cartas a Berta) is a 1966 Spanish drama film written and directed by Basilio Martín Patino which stars Mari Carrillo, Emilio Gutiérrez Caba, and Antonio Casas. It is widely acknowledged as a hallmark title of the so-called Nuevo Cine Español.

== Plot ==
In the 1950s, Lorenzo Carvajal, son to a former Francoist combatant now working in a bank and a pious housewife, returns to Salamanca from a spell in England. He writes love letters to a woman he met in England, Berta Carballeira (never featured onscreen), the daughter of a Spanish exile, also detailing the sense of weariness he experiences back in his native city, as he feels stranged from his family, local girlfriend, and friends.

== Cast ==
- Emilio G. Caba as el hijo (Lorenzo)
- Mari Carrillo as la madre
- Elsa Baeza as la novia (Mari Tere)
- Lepe as el tío farmacéutico
- Nicolás Perchicot as el viejo profesor
- José M.ª Resel as Benito
- Yelena Samarina as Trini
- Miguel Palenzuela as Astudillo
- Iván Tubau as el amigo extranjero (Jacques)
- Antonio Casas as el padre

== Production ==
The film is an Eco Films and Transcontinental Films Española (Transfisa) production. Shooting locations included Madrid and Salamanca.

== Release ==
The film was presented at the 14th San Sebastián International Film Festival in June 1966. It was released theatrically in Spain on 27 February 1967. 417,965 tickets were sold, with the film proving to be a blockbuster relative to comparable Nuevo Cine Español titles.

== See also ==
- List of Spanish films of 1967
