= Luis Barbero =

Spanish actor

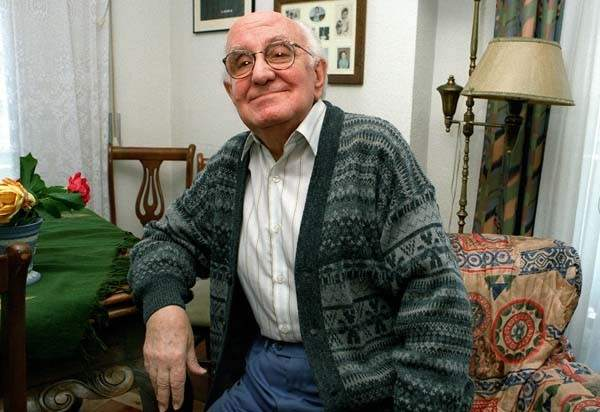
- Luis Barbero in 2000s
- Born: Luis Barbero Fernández; 8 August 1916; Madrid, Spain
- Died: 3 August 2005 (aged 88); Madrid, Spain
- Occupation: Actor
- Years active: 1957 – 2001

Luis Barbero Fernández (8 August 1916 – 3 August 2005) was a Spanish actor. He appeared in more than 150 films and television shows between 1957 and 2001. In 2000, he was awarded with a Lifetime Achievement Award from the Spanish Actors Union. He died of a heart attack in 2005.

== Selected filmography ==
- El hombre que viajaba despacito (1957) - Hombre en estación
- Historias de Madrid (1958) - Empleado municipal
- El día de los enamorados (1959) - Encargado en la Tienda de Deportes
- Vuelve San Valentín (1962)
- La gran familia (1962) - El cartero
- El juego de la verdad (1963)
- Marisol rumbo a Río (1963) - Don Braulio
- El pecador y la bruja (1964)
- Casi un caballero (1964) - Cliente en el Hotel
- Búsqueme a esa chica (1964) - Lucas
- Per un pugno nell'occhio (1965) - Contratante
- Mi canción es para ti (1965) - Farmacéutico
- Cabriola (1965) - Portero Plaza de Toros
- Snakes and Ladders (1965) - Recepcionista Hotel
- Las últimas horas... (1966)
- Las viudas (1966) - Mariano (segment "Luna de miel)
- Jugando a morir (1966) - Basilio
- Un millón en la basura (1967) - Portero casa Don Leonardo
- ¿Qué hacemos con los hijos? (1967)
- Novios 68 (1967) - Don Joaquín
- Un día es un día (1968) - Empleado de Don Honorio
- Blood in the Bullring (1969) - Jorge
- Cuatro noches de boda (1969) - Tío de Joaquín
- Con ella llegó el amor (1970) - Caprini
- Cateto a babor (1970) - Alfredo, visitante de Enriqueta
- Después de los nueve meses (1970) - Padre de Rosario
- Dele color al difunto (1970) - Don Matías
- El sobre verde (1971) - Bombero
- Las siete vidas del gato (1971) - Camarero
- Hay que educar a papá (1971) - Jugador de Mus #2
- Una chica casi decente (1971) - Mirón en el pase de bikinis
- Las ibéricas F.C. (1971) - Fan with binoculars
- Simón, contamos contigo (1971) - Director de la delegación de la Editorial
- Mi querida señorita (1972)
- La cera virgen (1972) - Médico
- La garbanza negra, que en paz descanse... (1972) - Don José
- Ligue Story (1972) - Médico (uncredited)
- Las colocadas (1972) - Admirador
- Guapo heredero busca esposa (1972) - Funcionario #1
- La curiosa (1973) - Don Valentín
- La descarriada (1973) - Vendedor de aspiradoras eléctricas
- Una monja y un Don Juan (1973) - Abuelo rebelde (uncredited)
- La llamaban La Madrina (1973) - El abuelo
- El abuelo tiene un plan (1973) - Guarda zoológico
- Me has hecho perder el juicio (1973) - Padre de Manolo
- Watch Out, We're Mad! (1974) - Jeremias
- Señora doctor (1974) - Hilario
- Matrimonio al desnudo (1974) - Don Basi
- El reprimido (1974)
- Las obsesiones de Armando (1974) - Recepcionista
- Polvo eres... (1974) - Don Emilio - el párroco
- El insólito embarazo de los Martínez (1974) - Cura
- Mi mujer es muy decente, dentro de lo que cabe (1975) - Sr. Guruceta
- Una abuelita de antes de la guerra (1975) - Cura Viejo
- No quiero perder la honra (1975) - Silvestre
- No matarás (1975) - Doctor
- El adúltero (1975) - Médico
- Zorrita Martinez (1975) - Sacerdote
- El mejor regalo (1975) - Don Luciano
- Nosotros, los decentes (1976) - Don Dimas
- La mujer es cosa de hombres (1976) - Sacerdote
- Esclava te doy (1976) - Narciso
- Madrid, Costa Fleming (1976) - Señor ambulancia
- Ligeramente viudas (1976)
- El señor está servido (1976) - Recuero
- Un día con Sergio (1976) - Practicante
- Fulanita y sus menganos (1976) - Emir Abdul Abbas
- Mauricio, mon amour (1976) - Don Braulio
- Los hijos de... (1976) - Vendedor de cupones
- Haz la loca... no la guerra (1976) - Comprador 1
- El bengador Gusticiero y su pastelera madre (1977) - Anciano
- Eva, limpia como los chorros del oro (1977) - Don Cosme
- Celedonio y yo somos así (1977) - Alcalde
- Gusanos de seda (1977) - Cura
- Niñas... al salón (1977) - Cura
- Casa de citas (1978)
- Donde hay patrón... (1978) - Cosme
- Suave, cariño, muy suave (1978) - Médico
- Fantasma en el Oeste (1978)
- El virgo de Visanteta (1979) - El cura
- La insólita y gloriosa hazaña del cipote de Archidona (1979) - Abuelo de Conchi
- Historia de 'S' (1979) - Paciente Zoófilo
- Visanteta, estáte quieta (1979) - Cura
- Los bingueros (1979) - Cegato
- And in the Third Year, He Rose Again (1980) - Hombre en banco del parque (uncredited)
- El alcalde y la política (1980) - Fulgencio
- Unos granujas decentes (1980) - González
- Los locos vecinos del 2º (1980) - Don Ángel
- Un cero a la izquierda (1980) - Borracho
- ¿Dónde estará mi niño? (1981) - Jacinto
- Los chulos (1981) - Rector del seminario
- El soplagaitas (1981) - Sebastián
- El Profesor erótico (1981) - Padre de Margarita
- La tía de Carlos (1982) - Don Francisco Chinchilla
- All Is Possible in Granada (1982) - Falsificador
- Los autonómicos (1982) - Melecio
- Loca por el circo (1982) - Manolo
- En busca del huevo perdido (1982) - Veterinario
- La colmena (1982) - Pepe
- Le llamaban J.R. (1982) - Marqués de Puerto Espiche
- Chispita y sus gorilas (1982) - Portero
- Martes y trece, ni te cases ni te embarques (1982) - Padre Vázquez
- La seta ibérica (1982) - Don Arturo
- De camisa vieja a chaqueta nueva (1982) - Víctor
- The Autonomines (1983) - Nicomedes padre
- Agítese antes de usarla (1983) - Párroco
- Los caraduros (1983) - Restaurant Customer (uncredited)
- Y del seguro... líbranos Señor! (1983) - Alonso
- Al este del oeste (1984) - Mr. First
- Cuando Almanzor perdió el tambor (1984)
- Padre nuestro (1985) - Sagrario
- ¡Qué tía la C.I.A.! (1985) - Amante de Amancia
- El suizo - un amour en Espagne (1985)
- A la pálida luz de la luna (1985) - Barman
- El donante (1985) - Don Pedro
- Cara de acelga (1987) - Hombre Hospital
- Madrid (1987)
- El Lute: Run for Your Life (1987) - Sacerdote
- Las cosas del querer (1989)
- Yo soy ésa (1990) - Abuelo de Ana
- The Dumbfounded King (1991) - Ferrán de Valdivieso
- Los gusanos no llevan bufanda (1992) - Hombre burgués
- On the Far Side of the Tunnel (1994) - Prior
- Corazón loco (1997) - Anciano
