= Ana Belén =

Spanish actress and singer (born 1951)

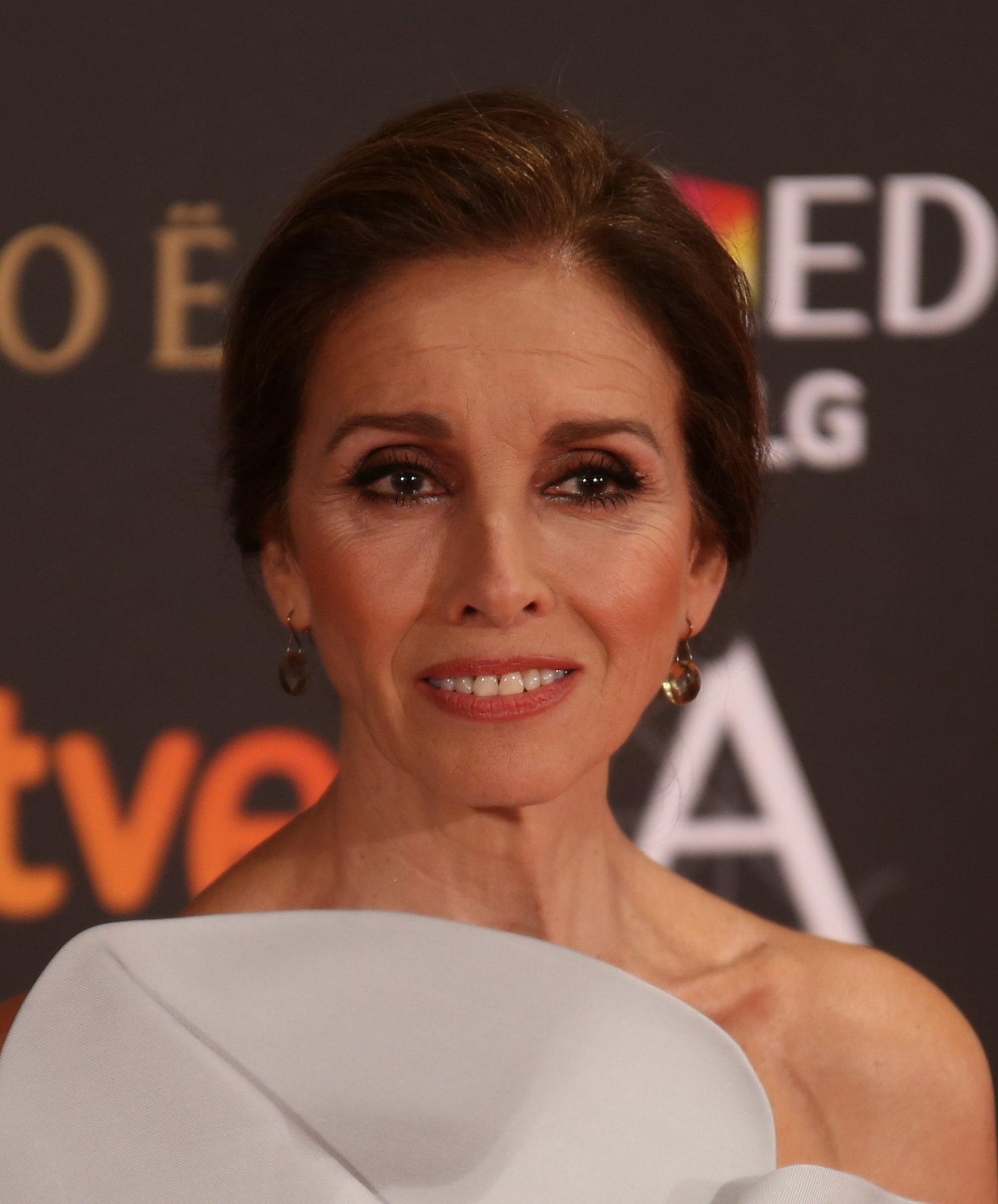
- Ana Belén in 2017
- Born: María del Pilar Cuesta Acosta; 27 May 1951 (age 75); Madrid, Spain
- Occupations: Actress and singer
- Years active: 1961–present
- Spouse: Víctor Manuel (m. 1972)
- Children: 2, including Marina

María del Pilar Cuesta Acosta (born 27 May 1951), known professionally as Ana Belén, is a Spanish actress and singer. She and her husband are considered symbols of the Spanish Transition, and her songs and albums often feature boldly-titled works with social and political content.

== Life and career ==
Born on 27 May 1951 in Madrid, María del Pilar Cuesta Acosta is the eldest of three siblings. Her father was a cook in Hotel Palace, and her mother worked as doorwoman at an estate. Cuesta made her feature film debut in Zampo y yo (1966) starring as a girl named Ana Belén alongside Fernando Rey; Cuesta took the character's name of Ana Belén as her stage name from then on.

After working in the film Morbo by Gonzalo Suárez with Víctor Manuel, Ana Belén married the latter on 13 June 1972 in Gibraltar. At this time she also started her career as a singer, releasing several successful albums. She appeared in various films: La petición by Pilar Miró; Emilia parada y fonda by Angelino Fons; El buscón by Luciano Berriatúa; La oscura historia de la prima Montse by Jordi Cadena; La criatura by Eloy de la Iglesia, and Sonámbulos by Manuel Gutiérrez Aragón.

In 1986, Ana Belén, alongside songwriter Víctor Manuel, performed the song "La Puerta de Alcalá". The single remained at the top position in Spain for seven weeks in summer 1986. In 1991, she recorded Como una novia, her first album that did not include any songs composed or adapted by Víctor Manuel. In 1997, she released a new album, Mírame, of her own songs and duets and which went on to become the best-selling album of her solo career. In autumn of 1996, she – along with Joan Manuel Serrat, Miguel Ríos, and Víctor Manuel – set ticket sales records throughout Spain with their "El gusto es nuestro" tour. In 1998, Belen commemorated Federico García Lorca's centenary by releasing two albums under the title of Lorquiana, a collection of poems and popular songs by Lorca. The following year another album was released Ana Belén y Miguel Ríos cantan a Kurt Weill, and she had a role in the Tele 5 series, Petra Delicado.

In 2024, for his comeback to cinema after an appearance in The Queen of Spain (2016) and her first film leading role since Things That Make Living Worthwhile (2004), Ana Belén joined the shooting of Islands.

== Discography ==
- 1965
  - Zampo y yo
  - Qué difícil es tener 18 años
- 1973
  - Al diablo con amor (BSO)
  - Tierra
- 1975
  - Calle del Oso
- 1976
  - La paloma del vuelo popular
- 1977
  - De paso
- 1979
  - Ana
  - Lo mejor de Ana Belén
- 1980
  - Con las manos llenas
- 1982
  - Ana en Río
- 1983
  - Victor y Ana en vivo
- 1984
  - Géminis
- 1985
  - BSO La corte de faraón
- 1986
  - Para la ternura siempre hay tiempo (with Víctor Manuel)
  - Grandes éxitos
- 1987
  - BSO Divinas palabras
- 1988
  - A la sombra de un león
- 1989
  - 26 grandes canciones y una nube blanca
  - Rosa de amor y fuego
- 1991
  - Como una novia
- 1993
  - Veneno para el corazón
- 1994
  - Mucho más que dos
- 1996
  - 20 exitos
  - El gusto es nuestro
- 1997
  - Mírame
- 1998
  - Lorquiana. Popular songs of Federico García Lorca
  - Lorquiana. Poems by Federico García Lorca
- 1999
  - Cantan a Kurt Weill (with Miguel Ríos)
- 2001
  - Peces de ciudad
  - Dos en la carretera
- 2003
  - Viva L`Italia
- 2006
  - Una canción me trajo aquí
- 2007
  - Anatomía
- 2008
  - Los grandes éxitos... y mucho más
- 2011
  - A los hombres que amé
- 2015
  - Canciones regaladas (with Víctor Manuel)
- 2018
  - Vida
- 2021
  - Ana Belén 70
- 2025
  - Vengo con los ojos nuevos

== Filmography ==
=== Film ===
Year	Title	Role	Notes	Ref.
1966	Zampo y yo	Ana Belén	Feature film debut	
1971	Españolas en París (Spaniards in Paris)	Isabel		
1971	Aunque la hormona se vista de seda			
1972	Morbo			
1973	Separación matrimonial			
1973	Al diablo, con amor			
1974	Tormento (Torment)	Amparo		
1974	Vida conyugal sana			
1974	El amor del capitán Brando (The Love of Captain Brando)	Aurora		
1975	¡Jo, papá!	Pilar		
1976	La petición (The Request)	Teresa		
1976	Emilia... parada y fonda	Emilia		
1976	El buscón	La bailarina ('the dancer')		
1977	La criatura	Cristina		
1978	La oscura historia de la prima Montse			
1978	Sonámbulos (Sleepwalkers)	Ana		
1979	Jaque a la dama			
1980	Cuentos eróticos			
1982	La colmena (The Beehive)	Victorita		
1982	Demonios en el jardín (Demons in the Garden)	Ana		
1985	La corte de Faraón (The Court of the Pharaoh)	Lota / Mari Pili		
1985	Sé infiel y no mires con quién (Be Wanton and Tread No Shame)	Rosa		
1986	Adiós pequeña	Beatriz Arteche		
1987	La casa de Bernarda Alba (The House of Bernarda Alba)	Adela		
1987	Divinas palabras (Divine Words)	Mari Gaila		
1988	Miss Caribe	Alejandra		
1989	El vuelo de la paloma (The Flight of the Dove)	Paloma		
1991	Cómo ser mujer y no morir en el intento	—N/a	Director	
1992	Después del sueño	Ángeles Gutiérrez		
1993	Rosa Rosae	Rosa		
1993	El marido perfecto			
1993	Tirano Banderas (Banderas, the Tyrant)	Lupita		
1994	La pasión turca (The Turkish Passion)	Desideria		
1996	Libertarias	Pilar		
1996	El amor perjudica seriamente la salud (Love Can Seriously Damage Your Health)	Diana		
2001	Antigua vida mía (Antigua, My Life)	Josefa Ferrer		
2004	Cosas que hacen que la vida valga la pena (Things That Make Living Worthwhile)	Hortensia		
2016	La reina de España (The Queen of Spain)			
2025	Islas (Islands)	Amparo Lamar		

=== Television ===
Year	Series/Program	Episode	Notes
1970	Teatro de siempre	La comedia nueva	
1970	Teatro de siempre	Hamlet en los suburbios	
1970	Teatro de siempre	Los caprichos de Mariana	
1970	Pequeño estudio	La trampa	
1970	Hora once	El extraño secreto de Shalken, el pintor	
1971	Hora once	Eleonora	
1971	Juegos para mayores	La finca	
1971	Estudio 1	Retablo de las mocedades del Cid	
1972	Estudio 1	Romeo y Julieta	
1980	Fortunata y Jacinta		
1999	Petra delicado		
2017	Traición		
2023	Un cuento perfecto		

=== Stage ===
- Romeo y Julieta despiertan… (2023/2024)
- Antonio y Cleopatra (2021)
- Eva contra Eva (2021/2022)
- Medea (2015/2016).
- Kathie y el hipopótamo (2013/2015)
- Electra (2012)
- Fedra (2007, 2009/2010)
- Diatriba de amor contra un hombre sentado (2004/2005)
- Defensa de dama (2002)
- La bella Helena (1995/1996)
- La gallarda (1992)
- El mercader de Venecia (1991/1992)
- Hamlet (1989)
- La casa de Bernarda Alba (1984)
- La hija del aire (1982)
- Tío Vania (1979)
- Antígona (1975)
- Ravos (1972)
- Sabor a miel (1971)
- Los niños (1970)
- Te espero ayer (1969)
- Don Juan Tenorio (1969)
- Medida por medida (1968)
- Las mujeres sabias (1968)
- El sí de las niñas (1967)
- El rufián castrucho (1967)
- El rey Lear (1966)
- Numancia (1965)

== Awards ==
- 1971 Best TV actress for Retablo de las mocedades del Cid Fotogramas Award
- 1972 Special mention for Morbo San Sebastián International Film Festival
- 1980 Best TV actress for Fortunata y Jacinta Fotogramas de Plata
- 1980 Best actress for Fortunata y Jacinta TP de Oro
- 1980 Best actress for La Corte del Faraón Bronce
- 1980 Chevalier des Arts et des Lettres
- 1987 Best actress for La Casa de Bernarda Alba and Divinas palabras Fotogramas de Plata
- 1988 Nominated for Best actress for Miss Caribe Goya Awards
- 1989 Nominated for Best actress for El vuelo de la Paloma Goya Awards
- 1991 Nominated for Best director for Como ser mujer y no morir en el intento Premios Ondas
- 1991 Nominated for Best director debut for Como ser mujer y no morir en el intento Goya Awards
- 1994 Best song for Contaminame Premios Ondas
- 1994 Nominated for Best actress for La Pasión Turca Goya Awards
- 1994 Best Actress for La Pasión Turca Goya Awards
- 1995 Gold Medal from the Spanish Cinema Academy
- 1995 Best theatre actress for La bella Helena Fotogramas de Plata
- 1996 Cadena Dial Award
- 1997 Best Female soloist. Carlos Gardel Awards
- 1997 Best actress El amor perjudica seriamente la salud Festival de Peñíscola
- 1997 Silver Lighthouse Award. Festival de Alfás del Pí
- 1997 Best Tour El gusto es nuestro Spanish Music Awards
- 1998 Nominated for Best Spanish female soloist for Lorquiana Premios Amigo
- 2000 William Layton Award
- 2001 Woman of the Year. Premios Elle
- 2001 Nominated Best Spanish female soloist for Peces de ciudad Premios Amigo
- 2002 Nominated Best female soloist for Peces de ciudad Latin Grammy Awards
- 2002 Runner up Defensa de dama Premios Mayte of Theatre
- 2003 Homage by the Instituto Cervantes of Toulouse
- 2004 Nominated for Best actress Cosas que hacen que la vida valga la pena Goya Awards
- 2004 Nominated for Best actress Cosas que hacen que la vida valga la pena Fotogramas de Plata
- 2004 Nominated for Best actress Cosas que hacen que la vida valga la pena Spanish Actors' Union
- 2004 Best actress Cosas que hacen que la vida valga la pena Premios Turia
- 2006 Málaga Award. Film Festival of Málaga
- 2007 Fine Arts Golden Medal presented by the Spanish royal family at Toledo Cathedral
- 2015 Latin Grammy Awards for Musical Excellence.
- 2017 Honorary Goya Award.
