= Anguish (1987 film) =

1987 film by Bigas Luna

- Original theatrical poster (U.S.)
- Directed by: Bigas Luna
- Written by: Bigas Luna
- Produced by: Pepón Coromina
- Starring: Zelda Rubinstein; Michael Lerner; Talia Paul; Angel Jove
- Cinematography: Josep M. Civit
- Edited by: Tom Sabin
- Music by: José Manuel Pagán
- Distributed by: Lauren Films (Spain); International Spectrafilm (U.S.); Manson International (Non-US except Spain)
- Release date: 25 March 1987 (Spain)
- Running time: 86 minutes
- Country: Spain
- Languages: English, Spanish
- Budget: $2,000,000 (estimated)
- Box office: $228.789 (US)

Anguish (Spanish: Angustia) is a 1987 Spanish horror film written and directed by Bigas Luna and starring Zelda Rubinstein, Michael Lerner, Talia Paul, Angel Jove and Clara Pastor.

== Plot ==
In the Los Angeles theater The Rex, moviegoers watch the film within a film, The Mommy.

The Mommy tells the story of John Pressman, an extremely myopic, uncontrolled diabetic who works as an ophthalmologist's assistant and is progressively growing blind. For unstated reasons, his overbearing mother Alice hypnotizes him and induces him to murder people so that he can remove their eyes and bring them back to her. One evening, John—against his mother's wishes—barricades himself inside of a movie theater playing The Lost World, where he sets about killing the patrons one by one with a scalpel. Once John's rampage becomes apparent, the surviving moviegoers attempt to flee the now sealed-off theater. The police bring Alice to the theater in an attempt to end the siege; in the course of trying to talk John down, Alice is accidentally shot to death by the police. The last scenes of The Mommy show John being placed into police custody and a detective looking upon Alice's corpse one more time.

As The Mommy wears on, patrons of The Rex begin to experience anxiety attacks and disorientation in response to the events onscreen. In particular, one man grows progressively agitated, constantly checking his watch; and a teenage girl, Patty, begins to break down in tears, though she cannot entirely articulate her fear. At a key point in the film, the man exits the theater and approaches the concession stand, where he's recognized by an employee as a frequent patron of The Mommy. Patty's friend, Linda, goes to use the bathroom moments later, and witnesses The Man removing a gun from his jacket and killing the concession worker and another theater employee. The Man drags their bodies to the bathroom—an act synchronized with John killing a woman in the bathroom of a movie theater in The Mommy. Linda escapes the theater and stops a man passing on the street, whom she asks to call the police.

In The Rex, the man barricades the projectionist in the projector booth and then slips back into the theater, where he holds Patty at gunpoint and begins reciting dialogue from The Mommy. When John Pressman begins his theater rampage onscreen, the man begins indiscriminately shooting patrons of The Rex, using Patty as a human shield.

Outside The Rex, a SWAT team arrives, in synchronicity with the police's arrival at the theater in The Mommy. The police obtain access to the projector booth via the roof and send in a sniper. The man holds Patty hostage in front of the theater, addressing Alice onscreen and asking her to come save him. Attempts by the police to engage the man fail; when the police in The Mommy kill Alice, the man becomes enraged, throws Patty to the ground, and resumes firing into the audience; the police sniper then shoots and kills him. Looking up at the screen, Patty has a vision of John gouging out her eye with a scalpel.

Outside, Patty and Linda are reunited and Patty is taken to the hospital for an evaluation. Doctors assure her that she is physically all right, though the experience was mentally scarring. As Linda leaves, she is attacked on an elevator by an unseen orderly who aims a scalpel for her throat. The orderly then proceeds to Patty's room and is revealed to be John, who assures Patty that he's only a figment of her imagination. Patty screams as John examines her eyes. As the screen cuts to black, the camera pulls back to show a movie theater of patrons watching the events onscreen, revealing that Patty's story was in fact a film within a film within a film. The credits for Anguish roll as the theater patrons leave one by one.

== Cast ==
- Zelda Rubinstein as Alice Pressman, the Mother
- Michael Lerner as John Pressman
- Talia Paul as Patty
- Ángel Jovè as The Killer
- Clara Pastor as Linda
- Isabel García Lorca as Caroline
- Nat Baker as Teaching Doctor
- Edward Ledden as Doctor
- Gustavo Gili as Student #1
- Antonio Regueiro as Student #2
- Joaquín Ribas as Student #3
- Janet Porter as Laboratory Nurse
- Patricia Manget as Nurse at Clinic #1
- Merche Gascon as Nurse at Clinic #2
- Jose M. Chucarro as Caroline's Boyfriend
- Antonella Murgia as Ticket Girl
- Josephine Borchaca as Concession Girl
- Georgie Pinkley as Laura
- Francesco Rabella as Don
- Diane Pinkley as Popcorn Woman
- Benito Pocino as Popcorn Man
- Víctor Guillén as Sleepy

== Reception ==
On Rotten Tomatoes, the film holds an approval rating of 57% based on 7 reviews, with a weighted average rating of 6.5/10.

Author and film critic Leonard Maltin awarded the film 2.5 out of 4 stars, calling it "Imaginative but overly violent". TV Guide rated the film three out of five stars, writing, "Anguish is a well-crafted and entertaining exercise in cinematic style, and a good example of an adventurous director turning to the horror genre in order to have more room to flex his pyrotechnical muscles." Time Out London called it "A strikingly original, intricately constructed, and extremely gruesome horror film", while noting that the execution occasionally didn't match its ambition.

== Awards and nominations ==
=== Won ===
Goya Awards

- Best Special Effects (Francisco Teres)

Sant Jordi Awards

- Best Film (Bigas Luna)

=== Nominated ===
Goya Awards

- Best Director (Bigas Luna)

== Remake ==
Ghost House Pictures and Vertigo Entertainment licensed the rights to remake in 2009, with Jake Wade Wall (When a Stranger Calls) writing the screenplay, but this version never materialized.

A new remake began development in 2021, with F. Javier Gutiérrez attached to direct. Production was slated to begin in winter 2022.
