= Jaime de Armiñán =

Spanish screenwriter and film director (1927–2024)

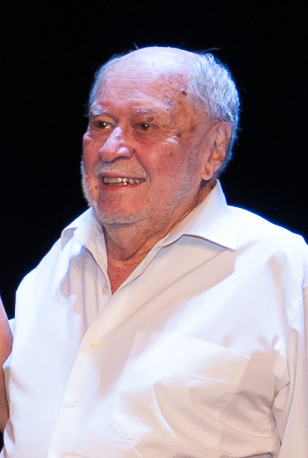
- Armiñán in 2014
- Born: Jaime de Armiñán Oliver; 9 March 1927; Madrid, Spain
- Died: 9 April 2024 (aged 97); Madrid, Spain
- Occupations: Film director Screenwriter
- Years active: 1961–2024

Jaime de Armiñán Oliver (9 March 1927 – 9 April 2024) was a Spanish screenwriter and film director. His films have been nominated for Academy Awards in the Foreign language film category twice, in 1972 for Mi querida señorita and in 1980 for El Nido.

His 1974 film El amor del capitán Brando was entered into the 24th Berlin International Film Festival. His 1985 film Stico was entered into the 35th Berlin International Film Festival, where Fernando Fernán Gómez won the Silver Bear for Best Actor. In 1994, his film Al otro lado del Túnel was entered into the 44th Berlin International Film Festival.

== Life and career ==
Jaime de Armiñán was born on 9 March 1927 in Madrid within a family of artist, politicians and writers. He studied law at Universidad Complutense de Madrid. After graduating as a lawyer, Armiñán began writing articles for such magazines as Fotos and Dígame.

In the 1950s, he established himself as an award-winning playwright whose best known works include Eva sin Manzana (Eve Without the Apple) (1953), Nuestro fantasma (1956) (Our Ghost) and Café del Liceo (Cafe of the Opera). Armiñán joined the television industry in 1959 when he was hired by Radiotelevisión Española, and soon developed a reputation as one of television most distinctive writer/directors, thanks to such series as Galeria de Maridos (1959) and Las Doce Caras de Juan (1967). During this period, Armiñán was also building a career as a screenwriter. He soon established himself as one of the most successful and prolific screenwriters, contributing with scripts most notably to José María Forqué, one of the most commercial popular directors of the day. Among his scripts credits during this time are : El Secreto de Mónica (Monica’s Secret) (1961), El juego de La verdad (The game of Truth) (1963), and El diablo bajo la Almohada (The devil under the Pillow).

As the natural progression in his work in films, Armiñán moved to become a film director. He made his debut as director with his own scripts in 1969 with Carola de día, Carola de noche, (Carola by day and by night ), a project tailor-made to revive the sagging career of former child star, Marisol who, at age 21, was starring her first role as an adult. This was followed by the equally forgettable: La Lola dicen que no vive sola (1970) (Lola does not live alone), a comedy about a prostitute who promises to Virgin Mary not to have sex again if her daughter recovers from an illness to the disappointment of the men around her. While this first two directorial attempts came and went with little notice, Armiñán won acclaim with his third effort: Mi Querida Señorita (My dearest Señorita) (1971) a project developed out of a collaboration with José Luis Borau. The film, starring the popular Spanish actor José Luis López Vázquez, tells the story of a repressed provincial spinster who late in life discovers that she is really a man and moves to the city to explore his new sexual identity. Mi Querida Señorita was a critical and popular success and was nominated in 1972 for the Oscars in the Foreign Language film category.

After the comedy Un casto varón español (1973), Armiñán made El amor del Capitan Brando (1974) (The Love of Captain Brando) a film that follows with sensitivity the relationship of Aurora, a young school teacher, with two men of opposite generations who fall in love with her: Fernando, a middle-aged republican exile, and Juan, a thirteen-year-old boy who enjoys playing acting in Westerns. El amor del Capitan Brando was a big commercial success. During the post Franco period, Armiñán sought ways to express both his political and social themes, but with varying degree of success. Nunca es tarde (1977) (Never too Late) recounts in parodied fashion the miraculous pregnancy of a woman in her eighties through her mystical identification with a young male neighbor who she claims is the child's spiritual father. A more pointed narrative of sexual and political repression comes through in Al servicio de la mujer española (At The service of the Spanish Woman) (1978), which parodies with black humor the puritanical sexual values of the francoist culture that outlived the regime and continued to shape provincial life.

Armiñán most acclaimed film of this period is El Nido (The Nest) (1980) which depicts the tragic consequences of the infatuation of an aging widower (Héctor Alterio ) for an adolescent girl played by Ana Torrent. While seemingly only to portrait the details of an autumn spring romance, the film exposes the dominance of Spanish women. The young girl who fashion herself on Lady Macbeth, and the ambivalence of Spanish men who are controlled by matriarchal power. Ana Torrent won the best actress award at the Montreal film festival for her performance, and the film was also nominated for an Oscar that year; this was Armiñán second nomination.

Armiñán's filmography over the next fifteen year remained notably slender, largely due to his return to television and his highly successful scripting of several dramatic series. One of the few films he made during this period, La Hora Bruja (The Witching Hour) (1985) is noteworthy for its strong dramatic performances by Francisco Rabal, Concha Velasco and Victoria Abril in an amorous narrative involving the activities of a lascivious traveling magician. Al otro lado del Tunel (The Other Side of the Tunnel) (1994), presents a similar story of passion and old age, this time with the amorous pair constituted by Maribel Verdú and Fernando Rey.

In 2008 Armiñán returned to directing films with 14, Fabian Road, starring Argentinian actress Julieta Cardinali, Ana Torrent and Ángela Molina.

Jaime de Armiñán was married to Elena Santonja, a popular television presenter. The couple had three children. De Armiñán died in Madrid on 9 April 2024, at the age of 97.

== Filmography ==
Year	English title	Original title	Notes
1969	Carola by day and by night	Carola de día, Carola de noche	
1970	Lola does not live alone	La Lola, dicen que no vive sola	
1971	My Dearest Senorita	Mi querida señorita	Academy Award: Nominated Best Foreign Language Film
1973	Un casto varón español	Un casto varón español	
1974	The Love of Captain Brando	El amor del capitán Brando	
1975	Jo, papá	Jo, papá	
1977	It is never too late	Nunca es tarde	
1978	At the Service of Spanish Womanhood	Al servicio de la mujer española	
1980	The Nest	El Nido	Academy Award Nominated: Best Foreign language Film
1981	In September	En Septiembre	
1985	Stico	Stico	
1985	The Witching Hour	La hora bruja	
1987	My general	Mi general	
1987	Juncal	Juncal	Miniseries made for television
1994	The Other Side of the Tunnel	Al otro lado del Túnel	
1995	The Lame Pigeon	El Palomo cojo	
2008	14, Fabian Road	14, Fabian Road	
