= Pedro Ruiz (actor) =

Spanish radio presenter and entertainer

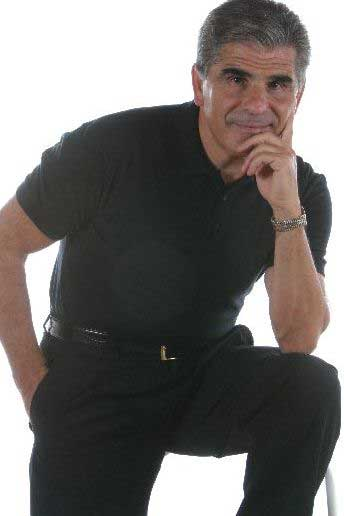
- Pedro Ruiz
- Born: 17 August 1947 (age 78); Barcelona, Spain

Pedro Ruiz (born 17 August 1947) is a Spanish radio presenter, actor, screenwriter and comedian.

== Radio ==
As an RJ, Pedro has anchored various programmes.

== Television ==
In 1972, Pedro Ruiz started his television career at Televisión Española by presenting the show Estudio Estadio. In 1974, he appeared in the show ¿Le conoce usted? telecast on TVE. He remained one of the most popular presenters in Spain from the 1970s to the 1990s.

== Awards and nominations ==
- Nominated, Goya Award for Best Supporting Actor (1987) for Moros y Cristianos.
- Won, TP d'Oru (1986) Most Popular Person forComo Pedro por su casa.

== Filmography ==
- "Saben aquell" (2023) as Pedro Ruiz
- "The Bigger, the Better" (2017) as Padre Santiago
- "Oh, quina joia!" (2016) as Jimmy
- "¿Qué fue de Jorge Sanz?" (TV Series 2016)as Pedro Ruiz
- "Academia de baile Gloria" (TV Series 2001)
- "Proceso a ETA" (1989)
- "La claror daurada" (TV Series 1989)
- "Moors and Christians" (1987) as Pepe
- "Policía" (1987) as Vigilante estadio (uncredited)
- "El gran mogollón" (1982)
- "Volver an empezar (1982) as Juan Carlos I (voice)
- "El día del presidente (1979) as President
