= Ángel Álvarez =

Spanish actor

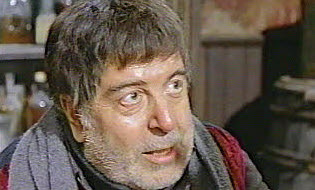
- Ángel Álvarez in Django (1966)
- Born: 26 September 1906; Madrid, Spain
- Died: 13 December 1983 (aged 77); Madrid, Spain
- Years active: 1945–1983

Ángel Álvarez (26 September 1906 – 13 December 1983) was a prolific Spanish film actor.

== Career ==
He made over 205 film appearances between 1945 and 1982. He is probably best known for his Western films of the 1960s and 1970s. He appeared in Spaghetti Western films such as Navajo Joe, and Django in 1966 opposite Franco Nero. He often played a plump store keeper or a bank manager.

== Selected filmography ==
- Eloisa Is Under an Almond Tree (1943) - Espectador del cine (uncredited)
- El destino se disculpa (1945) - Conserje de la radio (uncredited)
- La luna vale un millón (1945) - Financiero (uncredited)
- Cinco lobitos (1945)
- Unknown Path (1946) - Barman
- El crimen de Pepe Conde (1946)
- María Fernanda, la Jerezana (1947)
- Fuenteovejuna (1947)
- Don Quixote (1947) - Segundo Fraile (Second Friar) (uncredited)
- Anguish (1947) - Bibliotecario
- El marqués de Salamanca (1948) - Recepcionista hotel
- Pequeñeces... (1950) - criado de Jacobo
- Tiempos felices (1950)
- Our Lady of Fatima (1951) - (uncredited)
- The Great Galeoto (1951)
- Lola the Coalgirl (1952) - Parroquiano (uncredited)
- Cerca de la ciudad (1952) - Juan
- Facultad de letras (1952) - Camarero
- From Madrid to Heaven (1952) - Cochero
- Devil's Roundup (1952) - Cajero
- Last Day (1952) - Dueño de la churrería
- Doña Francisquita (1952) - Un señor (uncredited)
- El encuentro (1952)
- Welcome Mr. Marshall! (1953) - Pedro
- I Was a Parish Priest (1953) - Tendero (uncredited)
- Nadie lo sabrá (1953) - Compañero de Pedro
- Airport (1953) - Lorenzo
- Adventures of the Barber of Seville (1954) - Dueño de la posada (uncredited)
- Three are Three (1954) - (segment "Introducción: Tribunal")
- Tres huchas para Oriente (1954) - Cliente de José
- Nosotros dos (1955) - Customer (uncredited)
- El coyote (1955)
- Duelo de pasiones (1955)
- Mañana cuando amanezca (1955) - Karl Naumann
- Noche de tormenta (1955)
- The Red Fish (1955) - Portero del teatro
- Recluta con niño (1956) - Marido de Enriqueta
- The Coyote's Justice (1956) - Fiscal
- La vida en un bloc (1956) - Cura párrroco (uncredited)
- The Big Lie (1956) - Guionista de Sándalo (uncredited)
- Esa voz es una mina (1956)
- Miedo (1956)
- We're All Necessary (1956) - Cocinero restaurante del tren
- We Thieves Are Honourable (1956) - Farmacéutico
- Andalusia Express (1956) - Apostador en frontón (uncredited)
- El malvado Carabel (1956) - Olalla
- Manolo guardia urbano (1956) - Dueño de la mantequería (uncredited)
- Miracle of the White Suit (1956) - Tabernero
- Piedras vivas (1956)
- Miguitas y el carbonero (1956)
- Dimentica il mio passato (1957)
- El hombre que viajaba despacito (1957) - Marcelino
- Un abrigo a cuadros (1957)
- Faustina (1957) - Guardia (uncredited)
- El genio alegre (1957)
- Fulano y Mengano (1957) - Encargado de obra
- Un marido de ida y vuelta (1957) - Sacerdote
- Polvorilla (1957)
- Las muchachas de azul (1957) - Payaso
- Historias de Madrid (1958) - Lucas
- The Tenant (1958) - Consejero
- Familia provisional (1958)
- Aquellos tiempos del cuplé (1958) - Don Benigno
- El hombre del paraguas blanco (1958) - El boticario
- Vengeance (1958) - Amo 2
- Muchachas en vacaciones (1958)
- Villa Alegre (1958) - Ramiro
- El Pisito (1959) - Sáenz
- El puente de la paz (1958) - Vecino
- Ana dice sí (1958) - Portero
- Los clarines del miedo (1958) - Músico
- Hospital general (1958)
- Die Sklavenkarawane (1958) - Bimbaschi (uncredited)
- Where Are You Going, Alfonso XII? (1959) - Tabernero (uncredited)
- Soledad (1959)
- Juego de niños (1959)
- Gayarre (1959) - Mecenas
- Bombas para la paz (1959) - Padre de la novia citada a las 11
- Luxury Cabin (1959) - Padrino
- Salto a la gloria (1959) - Fotógrafo
- Y después del cuplé (1959)
- They Fired with Their Lives (1959)
- La vida alrededor (1959) - Don Heliodoro
- Der Löwe von Babylon (1959) - Kepek
- El día de los enamorados (1959) - Cliente en Tienda de Deportes
- El gafe (1959)
- Los chicos (1959) - (uncredited)
- El secreto de papá (1959)
- Legions of the Nile (1959)
- El amor que yo te di (1960)
- Siempre en la arena (1960)
- El cerro de los locos (1960) - Don Daniel
- Juanito (1960)
- Carnival Day (1960)
- The Fabulous Fraud (1960) - Pascual
- Compadece al delincuente (1960)
- Le tre eccetera del colonnello (1960)
- La quiniela (1960)
- El Cochecito (1960) - Álvarez
- The Two Rivals (1960)
- One Step Forward (1960) - Cocinero
- My Street (1960) - Tratante de caballos (uncredited)
- 091 Policía al habla (1960) - Melonero
- La estatua (1961)
- Margarita se llama mi amor (1961) - Manolo, hombre sentado en el baile
- La bella Mimí (1961)
- Prohibido enamorarse (1961) - El burrero
- Darling (1961)
- Honorables sinvergüenzas (1961) - Roque Martínez Calero
- Despedida de soltero (1961)
- Tres de la Cruz Roja (1961) - Don José
- Armas contra la ley (1961)
- Fray Escoba (1961) - Fray Tomás
- Zorro the Avenger (1962) - Ciudadano
- Accidente 703 (1962) - Mariano (uncredited)
- Los que no fuimos a la guerra (1962) - Fernández
- Sabían demasiado (1962)
- The Balcony of the Moon (1962) - Cura
- Una isla con tomate (1962)
- Cupido contrabandista (1962)
- La gran familia (1962) - El frutero
- Les quatre vérités (1962)
- Operación Embajada (1963) - Anticuario
- La becerrada (1963) - Chamorro
- El sol en el espejo (1963) - Frutero
- The Executioner (1963) - Álvarez, el enterrador
- La máscara de Scaramouche (1963)
- A Nearly Decent Girl (1963) - Guía Don Quijote
- Marisol rumbo a Río (1963) - Cliente en gasolinera
- Pacto de silencio (1963) - Cap. Esteban Durante
- Júrame (1964)
- I promessi sposi (1964)
- Isidro el labrador (1964)
- The Chosen Ones (1964) - Aldeano en tren
- Weeping for a Bandit (1964) - Cliente de la posada
- Fin de semana (1964) - Don Eloy
- Damned Pistols of Dallas (1964) - Fast Draw
- Tintin and the Blue Oranges (1964) - le Professeur Zalamea
- The Pleasure Seekers (1964) - (uncredited)
- Three Dollars of Lead (1964)
- La frontera de Dios (1965)
- Historias de la televisión (1965)
- Currito of the Cross (1965) - Don Antonio
- El cálido verano del Sr. Rodríguez (1965)
- Mi canción es para ti (1965) - Don Napoleón
- Madamigella di Maupin (1966) - Monseigneur de Maupin
- Rose rosse per Angelica (1966)
- Django (1966) - Nathaniel the Bartender
- Navajo Joe (1966) - Oliver Blackwood - Bank Manager
- Non faccio la guerra, faccio l'amore (1966)
- Eroe vagabondo (1966)
- Fury of Johnny Kid (1967) - Padre
- El hombre de Caracas (1967)
- Operación Dalila (1967) - Botín
- Las 4 bodas de Marisol (1967) - Sacerdote #1
- El Baldiri de la costa (1968) - Rector
- Requiem for a Gringo (1968) - Samuel, Saloon Owner
- The Mercenary (1968) - Notary (uncredited)
- Cemetery Without Crosses (1969) - Barkeeper (uncredited)
- Pasto de fieras (1969)
- Esa mujer (1969)
- Mi marido y sus complejos (1969) - Ernesto
- Educando a una idiota (1969)
- The Price of Power (1969) - J. B. Cotton
- El alma se serena (1970) - Taxista
- Adiós, Sabata (1970) - Bookie (uncredited)
- Préstame quince días (1971) - Arturo
- Una chica casi decente (1971)
- Delusions of Grandeur (1971) - (uncredited)
- Rain for a Dusty Summer (1971) - The Bishop (uncredited)
- La montaña rebelde (1971) - Don Fabián
- En un mundo nuevo (1972) - Taxista
- Ligue Story (1972) - El párroco
- Sting of the West (1972)
- A Reason to Live, a Reason to Die (1972) - Scully the Monger (uncredited)
- Secuestro a la española (1972)
- The Scarlet Letter (1973) - Rev. Wilson
- ¡Qué cosas tiene el amor! (1973) - Miembro del rodaje
- Corazón solitario (1973) - Sacerdote
- Ricco the Mean Machine (1973) - Giuseppe Calogero
- Verflucht, dies Amerika (1973)
- Celos, amor y Mercado Común (1973)
- Grandeur nature (1974) - Spaniard at party (uncredited)
- Los caballeros del Botón de Ancla (1974) - Don Cristino
- El reprimido (1974)
- Doctor, me gustan las mujeres, ¿es grave? (1974) - Médico
- El insólito embarazo de los Martínez (1974) - Hombre en combate de boxeo
- Vida íntima de un seductor cínico (1975)
- Nosotros, los decentes (1976) - Don Domingo
- El alijo (1976) - Agente
- Ligeramente viudas (1976)
- Guerreras verdes (1976) - Sacerdote
- The Anchorite (1976) - Álvarez
- La mujer es un buen negocio (1977) - Cliente del limpiabotas
- Viaje al centro de la Tierra (1977) - Professor
- Uno del millón de muertos (1977)
- Nunca es tarde (1977) - Abuelo
- Doña Perfecta (1977)
- Hail Hazana (1978) - Hermano Pedro
- Avisa a Curro Jiménez (1978)
- La escopeta nacional (1978)
- Cabo de vara (1978)
- Soldados (1978)
- Tigers in Lipstick (1979)
- El rediezcubrimiento de México (1979) - Cura
- Un pasota con corbata (1982)
- Nacional III (1982)
- Un rolls para Hipólito (1982) - Huésped #2
- Los pajaritos (1983)
