= List of Spanish films of 1984 =

A list of Spanish-produced and co-produced feature films released in Spain in 1984.

== Films ==
Release		Title (Domestic title)	Cast & Crew	Ref.
J A N U A R Y	20	Epilogue (Epílogo)	Director: Gonzalo Suárez Cast: José Sacristán, Francisco Rabal, Charo López, Sandra Toral	
J A N U A R Y	26	Bicycles Are for the Summer (Las bicicletas son para el verano)	Director: Jaime Chávarri Cast: Amparo Soler Leal, Agustín González, Victoria Abril	
J A N U A R Y	26	El caso Almería	Director: Pedro Costa Cast: Agustín González, Fernando Guillén, Manuel Alexandre, Pedro Díaz del Corral, Iñaki Miramón, Antonio Banderas, Juan Echanove, Muntsa Alcañiz	
F E B R U A R Y	17	La muerte de Mikel	Director: Imanol Uribe Cast: Imanol Arias, Montserrat Salvador, Fama, Amaia Lasa, Xabier Elorriaga, Daniel Dicenta	
M A R C H	8	Akelarre	Director: Pedro Olea Cast: Silvia Munt, José Luis López Vázquez, Mari Carrillo, Walter Vidarte, Patxi Bisquert, Iñaki Miramón	
A P R I L	4	The Holy Innocents (Los santos inocentes)	Director: Mario Camus Cast: Alfredo Landa, Francisco Rabal, Agustín González, Terele Pávez, Ágata Lys, Juan Diego, Mary Carrillo, Maribel Martín	
A P R I L	6	Feroz	Director: Manuel Gutiérrez Aragón Cast: Fernando Fernán Gómez, Frédéric de Pasquale	
J U N E	28	Dinero negro	Director: Carlos Benpar Cast: Pedro Gian, Martine Audó, Marta Padovan, Alfred Lucchetti, Francisco Piquer, Luis G. Berlanga, Conrado San Martín	
J U L Y	2	Fanny Straw Hair (Fanny Pelopaja)	Director: Vicente Aranda Cast: Fanny Cottençon, Bruno Cremer, Francisco Algora, Berta Cabré	
S E P T E M B E R	1	Sesión continua	Director: José Luis Garci Cast: Adolfo Marsillach, Jesús Puente, María Casanova, José Bódalo, Encarna Paso	
S E P T E M B E R	1	Tasio	Director: Montxo Armendariz Cast: Patxi Bisquert, Amaia Lasa	
O C T O B E R	25	What Have I Done to Deserve This? (¿Qué he hecho yo para merecer esto?)	Director: Pedro Almodóvar Cast: Carmen Maura, Luis Hostalot, Gonzalo Suárez, Ángel de Andrés López, Verónica Forqué, Kiti Mánver, Chus Lampreave, Amparo Soler Leal	
D E C E M B E R	21	La Biblia en pasta	Director: Manuel Summers	
