= Voyage to Nowhere =

El viaje a ninguna parte
- Theatrical release poster
- Directed by: Fernando Fernán Gómez
- Written by: Fernando Fernán Gómez
- Based on: El viaje a ninguna parte by Fernando Fernán Gómez
- Produced by: Julián Mateos; Maribel Martín
- Starring: José Sacristán; Laura Del Sol; Juan Diego; María Luisa Ponte; Gabino Diego; Nuria Gallardo; Fernando Fernán Gómez
- Cinematography: José Luis Alcaine
- Edited by: Pablo González del Amo
- Music by: Pedro Iturralde
- Release date: 15 October 1986
- Running time: 140 minutes
- Country: Spain
- Language: Spanish

Voyage to Nowhere (Spanish: El viaje a ninguna parte) is a 1986 Spanish comedy drama film written, starred and directed by Fernando Fernán Gómez. It is based on his own novel with the same title.

== Plot ==
The film tells the story of a group of comedians. It is a story about their loves and heartbreaks and their desires and frustrations.

Throughout the journey, their work is interspersed with love, family financial problems, and the hunger to triumph a dream. The central character, Carlos Galván, is the son of the first actor and director of the company, don Arturo, and he's the father of Carlito, a kid who does not want to be a comic. Carlos Galván takes refuge in a fantasy world.

== Cast ==
- José Sacristán as Carlos Galván
- Laura del Sol as Juanita Plaza
- Juan Diego as Sergio Maldonado
- María Luisa Ponte as Julia Iniesta
- Gabino Diego as Carlos Piñeiro
- Nuria Gallardo as Rosita del Valle
- Fernando Fernán Gómez as Don Arturo
- Queta Claver as Doña Leonor
- Emma Cohen as Sor Martirio
- Agustín González as Zacarías Carpintero
- Carlos Lemos as Daniel Otero
- Miguel Rellán as Dr. Arencibia
- Simón Andreu as Solís
- José María Caffarel
- Carmelo Gómez
- Tina Sáinz
- Nacho Martínez

== Awards ==
The film won the First Goya Award ever given as Best Film, Best Director and Best Screenplay.
