= Bicycles Are for the Summer =

The title Bicycles Are for the Summer may refer to:

- Bicycles Are for the Summer (play), by Fernando Fernán Gómez
- Bicycles Are for the Summer (film), directed by Jaime Chávarri and based on the play
