= El caso Almería =

The Almería Case
- Spanish: El caso Almería
- Directed by: Pedro Costa Musté
- Screenplay by: Manolo Marinero; Nereida B. Arnau; Pedro Costa
- Starring: Agustín González; Fernando Guillén; Manuel Alexandre; Margarita Calahorra; Pedro Díaz del Corral; Iñaki Miramón; Antonio Banderas; Juan Echanove; Muntsa Alcañiz
- Cinematography: José Luis Alcaine
- Edited by: Pablo G. del Amo
- Music by: Ricardo Miralles
- Production company: Multivideo S.A.
- Release date: 26 January 1984
- Running time: 120 minutes
- Country: Spain
- Language: Spanish

El caso Almería (English: The Almería Case) is a 1984 Spanish film directed by Pedro Costa Musté.

== Plot ==
The film tells the real story, known as the Almería Case, of three innocent men tortured and killed by the Civil Guard in 1981.

== Cast ==
- Agustín González as Mario Aguilar
- Fernando Guillén as teniente coronel González Alarcón
- Manuel Alexandre as Enrique
- Margarita Calahorra as madre de Luque
- Iñaki Miramón as Luis Trueba
- Pedro Díaz del Corral as teniente Luis Méndez
- Antonio Banderas as Juan Luque
- Juan Echanove as Luis Renedo
- Muntsa Alcañiz

== Release ==
The film was released theatrically in Spain on 26 January 1984, grossing 202,339,579 ₧ (233,863 admissions).

== See also ==
- List of Spanish films of 1984
