= Mambru Went to War =

- Spanish: Mambrú se fue a la guerra
- Directed by: Fernando Fernán-Gómez
- Written by: Pedro Beltrán
- Produced by: Miguel Ángel Pérez Campos
- Starring: Agustín González; Emma Cohen; Fernando Fernán-Gómez; María Asquerino
- Cinematography: José Luis Alcaine
- Edited by: Pablo G. del Amo
- Music by: Carmelo A. Bernaola
- Production companies: Altaïr; Ministerio de Cultura
- Distributed by: Divisa Home Video; Suevia Films
- Release date: 16 May 1986
- Running time: 99 min
- Country: Spain

Mambru Went to War (Spanish: Mambrú se fue a la guerra) is a 1986 Spanish drama film directed by Fernando Fernán-Gómez, written by Pedro Beltrán, scored by Carmelo A. Bernaola and starring Agustín González, Emma Cohen, Fernando Fernán-Gómez and María Asquerino. It is set after Francisco Franco's death.

Fernando Fernán Gómez received the Goya Award for Best Actor, and Pedro Beltrán and Agustín González were also nominated to Best Screenplay and Best Supporting Actor respectively.

== Plot ==
Franco's death marks a before and after in a family, mainly due to the discovery that his father, who was believed to have died during the civil war, was in hiding and is still alive.

== Cast ==
- Fernando Fernán-Gómez as Emiliano
- María Asquerino as Florentina
- Agustín González as Hilario
- Emma Cohen as Encarna
- Nuria Gallardo as Juanita
- Jorge Sanz as Manolín
- Carlos Cabezas as Rafael
- Alfonso del Real as Alcalde
- Francisco Vidal as Cura
- Tony Valento as Viajante
- José Segura as Guardia Civil
- Francisco Casares as Sargento
- Mimi Muñoz as Beata
- Raúl Fraire
- José María Resel
- Paco Torres
- Rafael Conexa as Médium
- Antonio Chamorro as Ramón
- Bruno Vella as Sobrino
- José Luis Aguirre
- Angela Rosal as Enfermera
- Julia Lorente as Beata
- Antonio Manso as Auxiliar
- José Ramón Pardo as Empleado
- Mari Carmen Alvarado
- María Luisa Ponte as Doña Ramona
- Juan Polanco
