= The Stilts =

- Film poster
- Spanish: Los zancos
- Directed by: Carlos Saura
- Screenplay by: Carlos Saura; Fernando Fernán Gómez
- Produced by: Emiliano Piedra
- Starring: Fernando Fernán Gómez; Laura del Sol; Francisco Rabal; Antonio Banderas
- Cinematography: Teo Escamilla
- Edited by: Pablo del Amo
- Production company: Emiliano Piedra PC
- Release date: September 1984 (Venice)
- Country: Spain
- Language: Spanish

The Stilts (Spanish: Los zancos) is a 1984 Spanish drama film directed by Carlos Saura and written by Saura and Fernando Fernán-Gómez which stars Fernán-Gómez, Laura del Sol, Francisco Rabal, and Antonio Banderas.

== Plot ==
Following the death of his significant other and his own attempted suicide, old professor Angel falls for younger neighbor Teresa, who is married to Alberto. Angel's sexual advances are initially rejected by Teresa, and upon seeing her with her husband, Angel ends up attempting suicide again.

== Cast ==
- Fernando Fernán-Gómez as Angel
- Laura del Sol as Teresa
- Antonio Banderas as Alberto
- Francisco Rabal as Manuel
- Enrique Pérez as Cobos
- José Yepes as secretary
- Adriana Ozores as Mercedes
- Amparo Soto as Laura
- Willy Montesinos as Revuelta
- Jesús Sastre as mayor

== Production ==
The film is an Emiliano Piedra PC production. It boasted a 70 million ₧ budget. Shooting locations included Torrelodones.

== Release ==
The film screened at the 41st Venice International Film Festival in September 1984. The film was not received with enthusiasm by critics, who generally considered it to be a minor, yet self-consciously minor, addition to Saura's filmography.

== See also ==
- List of Spanish films of 1984
