= La noche más hermosa =

- Directed by: Manuel Gutiérrez Aragón
- Starring: José M. Sacristán, Victoria Abril, Fernando Fernán Gómez, Bibi Andersen
- Release date: 1984
- Country: Spain
- Language: Spanish

La noche más hermosa is a 1984 film directed by Manuel Gutiérrez Aragón and starring José M. Sacristán, Victoria Abril, Fernando Fernán Gómez, and Bibi Andersen. A reviewer for All Movie Guide called an "ostensible comedy" and said it was "almost as hard to believe as director Manuel Gutiérrez-Aragón's previous effort Feroz."
