= Unmarried Mothers =

Unmarried Mothers may refer to:

- Unmarried mothers
- Unmarried Mothers (1975 film), a Spanish film
- Unmarried Mothers (1953 film), a Swedish drama film
