= Another's Wife =

- Directed by: Rafael Gil
- Written by: Torcuato Luca de Tena (novel); Rafael Gil; José López Rubio
- Starring: Martha Hyer; Analía Gadé; John Ronane
- Cinematography: José F. Aguayo
- Edited by: José Luis Matesanz
- Music by: Ernesto Halffter
- Production company: Coral Producciones Cinematográficas
- Distributed by: Paramount Films de España
- Release date: 23 November 1967
- Running time: 94 minutes
- Country: Spain
- Language: Spanish

Another's Wife (Spanish: La mujer de otro) is a 1967 Spanish drama film directed by Rafael Gil and starring Martha Hyer, Analía Gadé and John Ronane.

== Cast ==
- Martha Hyer as Ana María
- Analía Gadé as Pepa
- John Ronane as Andrés
- Ángel del Pozo as Enrique
- Elisa Ramírez as Alicia
- Manuel Alexandre as Policía
- María Francés
- Pastora Peña
- Erasmo Pascual as Hombre del bar
- Rafaela Aparicio as Mujer del bar
- Rafael Hernández as Conductor de excavadora
- Ángel de Andrés as Taxista
- Ana María Noé
- Alberto Dalbés as Santiago
- Fosco Giachetti as Alberto
- Inma de Santis as Ana María de niña

== Bibliography ==
- Bentley, Bernard. A Companion to Spanish Cinema. Boydell & Brewer 2008.
