= La becerrada =

- Directed by: José María Forqué
- Written by: Jaime de Armiñán; José María Forqué
- Screenplay by: Ricardo Muñoz Suay
- Produced by: Nazario Belmar
- Starring: Fernando Fernán Gómez; Amparo Soler Leal; Nuria Torray
- Cinematography: Alejandro Ulloa
- Edited by: Alfonso Santacana
- Music by: Graciano Tarragó
- Production company: Naga Films
- Distributed by: Dipenfa Filmayer Video S.A.; Divisa Home Video
- Release date: 27 May 1963
- Running time: 96 min
- Country: Spain

La becerrada is a 1963 Spanish comedy film directed by José María Forqué, written by Jaime de Armiñán and Ricardo Muñoz Suay, and starring Fernando Fernán Gómez, Amparo Soler Leal and . It was composed by Graciano Tarrago.

== Synopsis ==
In San Ginés de la Sierra, a small remote village in Andalusia, a convent nicknamed the Refuge of the Vanquished welcomes the destitute and taken care of by the nuns. But the convent's resources no longer allow them to continue their action. The nuns then asked the village mayor to lend them the arena to organize a charity becerrada. This becerrada features the bullfighters Antonio Ordóñez, Antonio Bienvenida and Mondeño in their own roles.

== Cast ==
- Fernando Fernán Gómez as Francisco Rodríguez 'Juncal'
- Amparo Soler Leal as Sor María
- Nuria Torray as Sor Leocadia
- María José Alfonso as Sor Matilde
- Antonio Ordóñez as Himself
- Antonio Bienvenida as Himself
- Juan García 'Mondeño' as Himself
- Ana María Noé as Madre Superiora
- Irene G. Caba as Sor Ignacia
- Alicia Hermida as Sor Consolación de los Afligidos
- Luisa Rosa de la Torre as Sor Purificación
- Ana María Ventura as Bibliotecaria
- Mª del Carmen Santoja as Sor Cecilia
- Rafaela Aparicio as Sor Inmaculada
- Carmen Pastor as Sor Leticia
- Félix Fernández as Ruiz
- Luis Heredia as Rosillo
- José Álvarez 'Lepe' as Bebé Chico
- Nicolás Perchicot as Cristóbal
- Antonio Gandía as Gutiérrez
- Vicente Gómez Bur as Don Héctor
- Emilio Santiago as Don Emilio
- Manuel Domínguez Luna as Don Vicente
- Alberto Reixa as Faustino
- Jacinto Martín as Juan
- Juan León Córdoba as Alcalde
- Manuel Alexandre as Don Policarpo
- Montserrat Noé as Mercedes
- María Jesús Balenciaga as Rafaelita
- José Luis Aparicio as Bailarín
- Pilar Gómez Ferrer as Madre de Rafaelita
- María Jesús Lampreave as Chus
- Ángel Álvarez as Chamorro
- Pilar Laguna as Pili
- Agustín González as Recitador
- Mer Casas as Chica rubia en coche
- Mercedes Guillot as Chica castaña en coche
- Luis Ramírez García
- Mary Begoña as Luisita
- José María Rodero as Don Heliodoro
