= Así en el cielo como en la tierra =

- Directed by: José Luis Cuerda
- Written by: José Luis Cuerda
- Starring: Fernando Fernán Gómez; Francisco Rabal; Jesús Bonilla; Mary Carmen Ramírez; Luis Ciges; Gabino Diego; Chus Lampreave; Mónica Molina
- Cinematography: Javier Salmones
- Release date: 1995
- Running time: 95 minutes
- Country: Spain
- Language: Spanish

Así en el cielo como en la tierra ("In heaven as it is on Earth", referencing the Our Father) is a 1995 Spanish comedy film directed by José Luis Cuerda.

== Plot ==
Matacanes arrives at Heaven but it is not exactly as he imagined it, as it resembles a typical Spanish village with God as the mayor and Saint Peter as a civil guard (although Saint Peter explains that this is Spanish Heaven and other countries' heavens are different). Some people, however, are nervous because God, unhappy with things on Earth, is planning to have another child. Jesus becomes jealous and tries to convince his father to accelerate the Apocalypse instead.

== Cast ==
- Francisco Rabal as Saint Peter
- Fernando Fernán Gómez as Father God
- Jesús Bonilla as Jesus Christ
- Luis Ciges as Matacanes
- Agustín González as San Isidore of Seville
- Mónica Molina as Lola Fajardo
- Mary Carmen Ramírez as Virgin Mary
- Juan Luis Galiardo as Ruíz del Río
- Enrique San Francisco as Archangel Gabriel
- Gabino Diego as John the Evangelist
- Chus Lampreave as Doña Asunción
- Achero Mañas as Pimentel
- Isabel Serrano as Mariví
- Antonio Gamero as Director banda
- Alicia Sánchez as Ira divina
- Manuel Alexandre as Saint Joseph
- Saturnino García as Tabernero
- Luis Pérez Agua as Ángel trompeta
- Pepín Salvador as Marlasca
- Luis Hostalot as Saint Michael
- Rosario Santesmases as Marisol del Val
- José Mª Sacristán as Patrón chiringuito
- Jorge Bosso as Psicoanalista
- María Galiana as Evangelina
- Mª Elena Flores as Madre de Lola
- José Carlos Gómez as Moncho
- Mª Luisa Veira as Presidenta asociación
- Liberto Rabal as Saint Raphael
- José Mª Lucena as Pregonero
- Javier Manrique as Camuñas
- Fernando Vivanco as Norberto
- Concha de Leza as Virtudes
- Roberto Cairo as Pedrosa
- Enrique Valero as Amigo Moncho
- Alex Angulo as Cabrero
- Olaya Aguirre as Amiga Lola
- Lucio Romero as Herido gleba
- Ana Isabel Mateo as Amiga Lola
- Paco Sanz as Moses
- Marga González as Mujer preocupada
- Rosa Morales as Chica purgatorio
- José María Caceres as Niño 1
- Daniel Alonso as Niño 2
- Alicia Suárez

== Critical reception ==
Fernando Morales in El País wrote that the movie just barely get a pass, despite the good casting. Carlos Aguilar in his Guía del cine español praises the premise and the actor's performances but concludes that the film "lacks shape and rhythm".
