= Pesadilla para un rico =

- Directed by: Fernando Fernán Gómez
- Screenplay by: Luis Alcoriza; Fernando Fernán Gómez
- Story by: Luis Alcoriza
- Starring: Carlos Larrañaga; Beatriz Rico; Álvaro de Luna; Carmen Elias
- Cinematography: Javier Salmones
- Edited by: Pablo G. del Amo
- Music by: Alexander Lubomirov Kandov
- Distributed by: United International Pictures
- Release date: 22 November 1996
- Country: Spain
- Language: Spanish

Pesadilla para un rico (English: Nightmare for the Rich) is a 1996 Spanish film directed by Fernando Fernán Gómez and written by Luis Alcoriza.
