= For Men Only (1960 film) =

- Directed by: Fernando Fernán Gómez
- Screenplay by: Fernando Fernán Gómez
- Based on: ¡Sublime decisión!, a 1955 play by Miguel Mihura
- Produced by: José Luis Dibildos
- Starring: Analía Gadé; Fernando Fernán Gómez; Elvira Quintillá
- Cinematography: Ricardo Torres
- Edited by: Rosa G. Salgado
- Music by: Antón García Abril
- Production company: Ágata Films
- Release date: 27 October 1960
- Running time: 85 minutes
- Country: Spain
- Language: Spanish

For Men Only (Spanish: Sólo para hombres) is a 1960 Spanish historical comedy film directed by Fernando Fernán Gómez, and starring Analía Gadé, Fernán Gómez, and Elvira Quintillá.

== Plot ==
In 1895, a woman goes to work as an official at the Ministry of Public Works, to the shock of her family.

== Partial cast ==
- Analía Gadé as Flora Sandoval
- Fernando Fernán Gómez as Pablo Meléndez
- Elvira Quintillá as Felisa
- Juan Calvo as Don Claudio
- Manuel Alexandre as Manolo Estévez
- Joaquín Roa as José
- Rosario García Ortega as Matilde
- Erasmo Pascual as Justo Hernández de la Berquera
- Ángela Bravo as Cecilia

== Bibliography ==
- Bentley, Bernard. A Companion to Spanish Cinema. Boydell & Brewer, 2008.
