= Laura del Sol =

Spanish actress

Laura del Sol (born 27 November 1961) is a Spanish flamenco dancer and film actress, specially well known for her title role in Carlos Saura's 1983 film Carmen. She worked with Saura and Antonio Gades in El Amor brujo, and in Italy, she acted in Giuseppe Tornatore's debut The Professor.

She was born in Barcelona.

== Partial filmography ==
- ¡¡Se armó el belén!! (1970) - Actress Child in Spot Tv (uncredited)
- Carmen (1983) - Carmen
- Las bicicletas son para el verano (1983) - Bailarina
- The Hit (1984) - Maggie
- Los zancos (1984) - Teresa
- The Two Lives of Mattia Pascal (1985) - Romilda Pescatore
- El Amor brujo (1986) - Lucía
- The Professor (1986) - Rosaria
- El viaje a ninguna parte (1986) - Juanita Plaza
- El gran Serafín (1987) - Blanchette Medor
- Daniya, jardín del harem (1988) - Laila
- Disamistade (1988) - Domenicangela
- Killing Dad or How to Love Your Mother (1989) - Luisa
- L'aventure extraordinaire d'un papa peu ordinaire (1990) - Laura
- Amelia Lópes O'Neill (1991) - Amelia Lópes O'Neil
- El rey pasmado (1991) - Marfisa
- La nuit de l'océan (1992) - Maria
- Tombés du ciel (1993) - Angela
- Santera (1994) - Paula
- Três Irmãos (1994) - Teresa
- The Crew (1994) - Camilla Marquez
- Tatiana, la muñeca rusa (1995) - Pat
- Gran Slalom (1996) - Vicky
- Il figlio di Bakunin (1997) - Donna Margherita
- Furia (1999) - Olga
- Tôt ou tard (1999) - Consuelo
- Not registered (1999) - Rosa
- Sotto gli occhi di tutti (2002) - Rosa
- Le monde nous appartient (2012) - La mère de Julien (photo)
