= Stico =

1985 film

- Directed by: Jaime de Armiñán
- Written by: Jaime de Armiñán; Fernando Fernán Gómez
- Starring: Fernando Fernán Gómez
- Cinematography: Teo Escamilla
- Edited by: José Luis Matesanz
- Release date: 4 March 1985
- Running time: 105 minutes
- Country: Spain
- Language: Spanish

Stico is a 1985 Spanish comedy film directed by Jaime de Armiñán about a broke Roman law professor who offers himself as a slave to an old student in exchange for house and food. It was entered into the 35th Berlin International Film Festival where Fernando Fernán Gómez won the Silver Bear for Best Actor.

== Cast ==
- Fernando Fernán Gómez as Don Leopoldo Contreras de Tejada
- Agustín González as Gonzalo Bárcena
- Carme Elias as María
- Amparo Baró as Felisa
- Mercedes Lezcano as Margarita
- Manuel Zarzo as Claudio
- Beatriz Elorrieta
- Manuel Torremocha
- Toa Torán
- Sandra Milhaud
- Bárbara Escamilla
- Vanesa Escamilla
- Manuel Galiana as Luis Cuartero

== Reception ==
Magazine Fotogramas describes the film as "somewhat blurred fable" but that it also has "sufficient ability to maintain the story with dignity".
