= La vida por delante =

- Directed by: Fernando Fernán Gómez
- Written by: Fernando Fernán Gómez; Manuel Pilares
- Starring: Fernando Fernán Gómez; Analía Gadé; Manuel Alexandre; Rafaela Aparicio; José Isbert; Gracita Morales
- Cinematography: Ricardo Torres
- Edited by: Rosa G. Salgado
- Music by: Rafael de Andrés
- Release date: 5 September 1958
- Running time: 90 minutes
- Country: Spain
- Language: Spanish

La vida por delante is a 1958 Spanish comedy film starring and written and directed by Fernando Fernán Gómez. The film enjoyed enough success to inspire a sequel, La vida alrededor, released in 1959.

== Plot ==
Life ahead narrates the misadventures of a newlywed couple, the lawyer Antonio Redondo (Fernando) and the doctor Josefina Castro (played by Fernán Gómez's partner at the time, the Hispanic-Argentine Analía Gadé) with their different avatars. Family, work and conjugal, especially with those insurmountable barriers that must be overcome in order to acquire a decent home. It emerges as an acid and gray portrait of the Spain of the fifties, explaining the miseries and hardships that squeezed the desire for prosperity and freedom of a youth that lived in a constant unreality, tortured by the lack of autonomy, hopes and expectations. Within an opaque, gloomy and gloomy nation that left no room for genius or debate.

== Nominations ==
The film was nominated for Best Film at the Mar del Plata International Film Festival in 1959.
