= Analía Gadé =

Argentine actress (1931–2019)

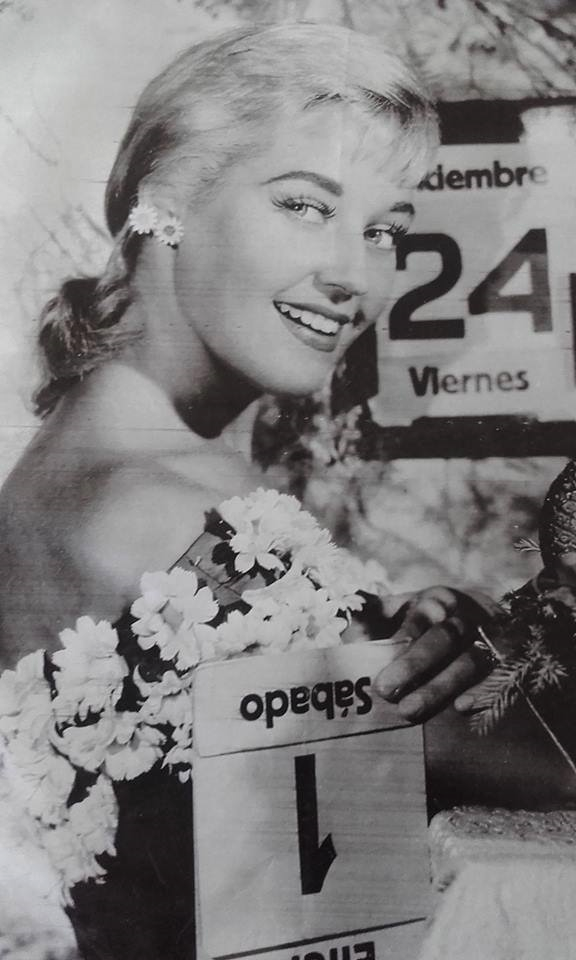
- Gadé in 1954
- Born: María Esther Gorostiza Rodríguez; 28 October 1931; Córdoba, Argentina
- Died: 18 May 2019 (aged 87); Madrid, Spain
- Other names: Analia Gade; Annalia Gadé
- Occupation: Actress
- Years active: 1948–2001
- Relatives: Carlos Gorostiza (half-brother)

María Esther Gorostiza Rodríguez (28 October 1931 – 18 May 2019), better known as Analía Gadé, was an Argentine actress. She appeared in more than 60 films between 1948 and 2001. She appeared in the film Emergency Ward, which was entered into the 1953 Cannes Film Festival. She was born in Córdoba, Argentina, and was the sister of Carlos Gorostiza. Three years after being diagnosed with cancer, she died on 18 May 2019, at the age of 87.

== Partial filmography ==
- La serpiente de cascabel (1948) - Alumna
- La Rubia Mireya (1948) - Lucía Robles
- Vidalita (1949)
- Cita en las estrellas (1949)
- Nacha Regules (1950)
- Don Fulgencio (1950) - Trinidad
- Especialista en señoras (1951)
- With the Music in my Soul (1951)
- Emergency Ward (1952)
- Vuelva el primero (1952) - Dorita
- The Corsican Brothers (1955)
- Yesterday Was Spring (1955) - Silvia
- Los tallos amargos (1956)
- La vida por delante (1958) - Josefina Castro
- La vida alrededor (1959) - Josefina Castro
- The Crossroads (1959) - Sandra
- La fiel infantería (1960) - Elisa
- For Men Only (1960) - Flora Sandoval
- Madame (1961) - Caroline Bonaparte
- You and Me Are Three (1962) - Manolina
- Four Nights of the Full Moon (1963)
- Crime on a Summer Morning (1965) - Consuelo Dermott
- Las Locas del conventillo (1966) - Lola
- Another's Wife (1967) - Pepa
- La vil seducción (1968) - Alicia Prades
- No disponible (1969)
- Pecados conyugales (1969) - Sofía
- El monument (1970) - María
- Coqueluche (1970) - Victoria Valdor
- In the Eye of the Hurricane (1971) - Ruth
- Exorcism's Daughter (1971) - Tania
- Nothing Less Than a Real Man (1972) - Julia Yáñez
- The Doubt (1972) - Lucrecia - Condesa de Lain
- Maniac Mansion (1972) - Elsa
- My Private Teacher (1973) - Francisca
- The King is the Best Mayor (1974) - Felicia
- The Marriage Revolution (1974) - Begoña
- Long Vacations of 36 (1976) - Virginia
- Las marginadas (1977) - Consuelo
- Cartas de amor de una monja (1978) - Madre Mariana de la Cruz
- La rosa Azul (2001)

== Television ==
- Tropicana Club (1952) – (3 episodes)
- La señora García se confiesa (1976) – (4 episodes)
- Fragmentos de interior (1984) – (4 episodes)
- Lucía Bonelli (1984) – (39 episodes)
- Una gloria nacional (1993) – (9 episodes)
- Compuesta y sin novio (1994) – (13 episodes)
- Carmen y familia (1996) – (16 episodes)
