= The Doubt =

- Directed by: Rafael Gil
- Written by: Benito Pérez Galdós (novel); Rafael J. Salvia
- Starring: Fernando Rey; Analía Gadé
- Cinematography: José F. Aguayo
- Edited by: José Luis Matesanz
- Music by: Manuel Parada
- Production company: Coral Producciones Cinematográficas
- Distributed by: Paramount Films de España
- Release date: 7 September 1972
- Running time: 92 minutes
- Country: Spain
- Language: Spanish

The Doubt (Spanish: La duda) is a 1972 Spanish drama film directed by Rafael Gil and starring Fernando Rey and Analía Gadé.

== Cast ==
- Fernando Rey as Don Rodrigo - Conde de Albrit
- Analía Gadé as Lucrecia - Condesa de Lain
- Ángel del Pozo as Ricardo
- Rafael Alonso as Senén Corchado
- José María Seoane as Venancio
- Cándida Losada as Gregoria
- Gabriel Llopart as Doctor Angulo
- Pilar Bardem as María
- Marcelo Arroita-Jáuregui as Don José
- Concepción Muñoz as La Marquesa
- Lali Romay as Dorotea
- Inma de Santis as Leonor
- Armando Calvo as Prior de Zaratay

== See also ==
- The Grandfather (1998)

== Bibliography ==
- de España, Rafael. Directory of Spanish and Portuguese film-makers and films. Greenwood Press, 1994.
