= The Remains from the Shipwreck =

1978 film

- Directed by: Ricardo Franco
- Written by: Ricardo Franco
- Produced by: José María Cunillés; José María Pascual
- Starring: Fernando Fernán Gómez
- Cinematography: Cecilio Paniagua
- Edited by: Guillermo S. Maldonado
- Release date: 1978
- Country: Spain
- Language: Spanish

The Remains from the Shipwreck (Spanish: Los restos del naufragio) is a 1978 Spanish drama film directed by Ricardo Franco. It was entered into the 1979 Cannes Film Festival.

== Plot ==
Mateo experiences a breakup in his relationship and leaves his home. He moves into a nursing home run by nuns, where he accepts a job as a gardener.

There, he meets a resident known as "the Maestro," a writer of fantasies who is preparing a dramatic performance to be staged for the feast day of the nursing home's patron saint.

== Cast ==
- Fernando Fernán Gómez - Maestro
- Ángela Molina - Adelaida / María
- Ricardo Franco - Mateo
- Alfredo Mayo - Don Emilio
- Felicidad Blanc - Doña Elsa
- Luis Ciges - Don Jorge
- Montserrat Salvador - Madre Superiora
- Marta Fernández Muro - Monja
- Isabel García Lorca - Monja
- Letizia Unzain - Monja
- Ana Gurruchaga - Monja
