= Primer Acto =

Spanish bimonthly theater magazine

- Categories: Theater magazine
- Frequency: Bi-monthly
- Founded: 1957
- First issue: April 1957
- Country: Spain
- Based in: Madrid
- Language: Spanish
- Website: Primer Acto
- ISSN: 0032-8367
- OCLC: 825181

Primer Acto is a Spanish bi-monthly theater magazine based in Madrid, Spain. It has been in circulation since April 1957.

== History and profile ==
Primer Acto was established in 1957, and the first issue appeared in April of that year. It was started as a successor to Teatro, which existed from 1952 to 1957. The magazine is published on a bi-monthly basis and covers Latin American and Spanish theatre. José Monleón is the director of the magazine, which is headquartered in Madrid. One of the earlier directors was José Monleon. José Luis Alonso is among the former editors. At the beginning of the 1960s the members of the editorial board included Arnold Wesker and Kenneth Tynan.
