= Manuel Alexandre =

Spanish actor

The Most Excellent Manuel Alexandre OAXS
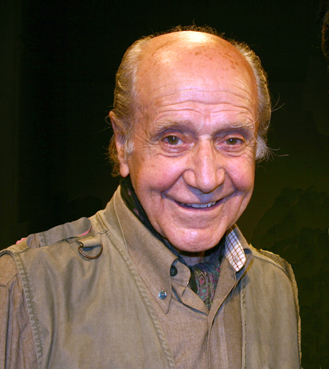
- Born: Manuel Alexandre Abarca; 11 November 1917; Madrid, Spain
- Died: 12 October 2010 (aged 92); Madrid, Spain
- Occupation: Actor
- Years active: 1947–2010

Manuel Alexandre Abarca OAXS (11 November 1917 – 12 October 2010) was a Spanish film and television actor.

== Career ==
He was a popular supporting actor. He won an Honorary Goya Award in 2003 for his career achievements.

== Filmography in cinema ==
1947

- Dos cuentos para dos

1952

- Welcome Mr. Marshall! (credited as Manuel Alejandre) .... Secretario

1953

- Nadie lo sabrá

1954

- Cómicos
- La venganza
- Felices pascuas
- Manicomio

1955

- Muerte de un ciclista ....
- El Mensaje ....

1956

- Viaje de novios ....
- Calle mayor ....
- El Malvado Carabel .... Dr. Solás
- Calabuch (credited as Manuel Alejandre) .... Vicente
- Todos somos necesarios ....
- La Vida es maravillosa ....

1957

- El Andén ....
- Los jueves, milagro .... Mauro
- The Tenant ....
- El Fotogénico ....

1958

- Night and Dawn ....
- I Zitelloni ....
- La vida por delante .... Manolo
- La venganza ....
- El Hombre del paraguas blanco ....
- El Aprendiz de malo ....

1959

- De espaldas a la puerta ....
- Fulano y Mengano ....
- Azafatas con permiso .... Agente C-38
- Sonatas .... Teniente Andrade
- Bombas para la paz (credited as Manuel Alejandre) .... Novio citado a las 11
- Y después del cuplé ....
- El Secreto de papá ....

1960

- La Paz empieza nunca ....
- 091 Policía al habla ....
- Amor bajo cero ....
- El traje de oro ....
- Sólo para hombres ....
- Hay alguien detrás de la puerta ....

1961

- Plácido .... Julián Alonso
- Vamos a contar mentiras ....

1962

- Les Quatre vérités ....
- Atraco a las tres .... Benítez
- Accidente 703 ....
- La Mano de un hombre muerto .... Theo
- Vampiresas 1930 .... Director

1963

- El Verdugo ....
- El Juego de la verdad ....
- La Batalla del domingo ....
- Chantaje a un torero ....
- La becerrada ....

1964

- La Boda ....
- La Muerte silba un blues .... Julius Smith
- Crucero de verano .... Gutiérrez
- Los Palomos, Los .... Eugenio Martínez
- El Señor de La Salle .... Abate Bricot
- El Salario del crimen ....

1965

- Il Segreto del vestito rosso ....
- Historias de la televisión .... Técnico de TV (1)
- La Primera aventura .... Remigio

1966

- Fray Torero ....
- Mayores con reparos ....
- Las viudas .... (episode. ’’Aniversario, El’’)
- Operación Plus Ultra ....
- Hoy como ayer .... Hipólito (farmacéutico moderno)
- Un Beso en el puerto ....
- La Barrera ....
- Monnaie de singe

1967

- Love in Flight ....
- La Mujer de otro ....
- El hombre que mató a Billy el Niño ....
- La Playa de las seducciones ....

1968

- Relaciones casi públicas ....
- Verde doncella ....

1969

- Estudio amueblado 2.P. .... Rovira, el jefe de personal
- Cuatro noches de boda ....
- Amor a todo gas ....
- Un Adulterio decente ....

1970

- Pierna creciente, falda menguante ....
- La Collera del vento .... Agustín
- Don Erre que erre ....
- Enseñar a un sinvergüenza .... Padre de Rosana
- ¡Se armó el belén! ....
- ¡Vivan los novios! ....

1971

- Blanca por fuera y Rosa por dentro .... Sr. Perales, el profesor

1972

- El Vikingo ....
- Ligue Story (credited as Manolo Alexandre) .... Jerónimo
- Alta tensión ....
- La Cera virgen ....
- ¡Qué noche de bodas, chicas! ....

1973

- Corazón solitario ....
- Don Quijote cabalga de nuevo .... Mozo del juicio ante Sancho Panza.
- Las Tres perfectas casadas ....
- Señora doctor .... Dentista

1974

- Doctor, me gustan las mujeres, ¿es grave? ....
- Los Nuevos españoles ....
- Tocata y fuga de Lolita ....
- Tamaño natural or (Grandeur nature) .... Jose Luis
- Jenaro el de los 14 ....
- Una chica y un señor ....

1975

- El asesino no está solo .... Detective 1
- Duerme, duerme, mi amor ....

1976

- Fulanita y sus menganos ....
- El Señor está servido ....
- Ambitious ....

1977

- Chely ....
- La Violación ....
- Hasta que el matrimonio nos separe ....
- El Puente .... Rafael
- Vota a Gundisalvo ....

1978

- Los días del pasado ....

1979

- La Insólita y gloriosa hazaña del cipote de Archidona .... Vicente
- La Boda del señor cura, .... Alcalde de Reajo del Pino

1980

- Black Jack ....
- La Guerra de los niños .... Don Matías 'Don Mati'
- Cariñosamente infiel ....
- Tú estás loco Briones .... El Fugas
- La Mano negra ....

1981

- Gay Club ....
- Préstame tu mujer ....
- La segunda guerra de los niños .... Don Matías
- Un pasota con corbata ....

1982

- Las Locuras de Parchís (, Las) .... Don Matías
- El cabezota ....
- Caray con el divorcio ....
- Adolescencia ....

1983

- Parchís entra en acción .... Don Matías

1984

- El Caso Almería ....

1985

- Extramuros .... Capellán

1986

- Las Tribulaciones de un Buda Bizco ....
- El año de las luces .... Emilio

1987

- ¡Biba la banda! ....
- El Bosque animado .... Roque Freire

1988

- Sinatra .... Manolo

1989

- Mar y el tiempo, El ....
- Loco veneno ....
- Amanece, que no es poco .... Paquito, su padre

1990

- Pareja enloquecida busca madre de alquiler

1991

- Fuera de juego
- El Amor sí tiene cura ....
- La Fuente de la edad .... Olegario, El Lentes
- El Beso del sueño .... El Padre

1992

- La Marrana .... Fray Jerónimo
- Una Mujer bajo la lluvia .... Don Emilio

1993

- Madregilda .... Four Eyes
- Tocando fondo .... Marcelino
- La Sombra del delator ....
- Todos a la cárcel .... Modesto

1994

  - n/d

1995

- Así en el Cielo como en la Tierra .... San José

1996

- El Ángel de la guarda .... Gen. Bazán
- Pesadilla para un rico .... Raúl
- Los Porretas ) .... José Pernales
- Adiós, tiburón .... Emiliano

1997

- Siempre hay un camino a la derecha .... Candelario
- Nadie como tú .... Sr. Vidal
- La Duquesa roja .... Cosme

1998

- La Vuelta de El Coyote .... Julián

1999

- París-Tombuctú .... Sento
- Pídele cuentas al rey .... Pepón

2000

- Terca vida .... Andrés
- Maestros ....

2001

- Lázaro de Tormes .... Escribano
- Clara y Elena .... Doctor

2002

- El Caballero Don Quijote .... Montesinos

2003

- Atraco a las 3... y media .... Don Felipe
- Dos tipos duros .... Don Rodrigo

2004

- Incautos .... Manco
- Franky Banderas .... Don Alejandro

2005

- Elsa y Fred .... Fred

2006

- Cabeza de perro .... Angelito
- ¿Y tú quién eres? .... Ricardo

== Honours ==
- Gold Medal of Merit in Labour (Kingdom of Spain, 19 January 2004).
- Knight Grand Cross of the Civil Order of Alfonso X, the Wise (Kingdom of Spain, 20 June 2008).

== See also ==
- Café Gijón (Madrid)
