= Trop jolies pour être honnêtes =

1972 film

Too Pretty to Be Honest
- French: Trop jolies pour être honnêtes
- Directed by: Richard Balducci
- Screenplay by: Catherine Carone; Guy Grosso
- Cinematography: Tadasu Suzuki
- Edited by: Michel Lewis
- Music by: Serge Gainsbourg
- Release date: 1972

Trop jolies pour être honnêtes (French pronunciation: [tʁo jɔli puʁ ɛtʁ ɔnɛt], Too Pretty to Be Honest), or 4 Souris pour un hold-up (IPA: [katʁ suʁi puʁ œ̃n‿oldœp], Four Mice for a Holdup, subtitled by the English VHS as "Four Chicks for a Holdup") is a 1972 French film directed by Richard Balducci. In 1985 International Home Video Corp. of Wilmington, Los Angeles, California released an English subtitled version of the film, under the series La Vidéo Française.

In the film four female roommates who live in the French Riviera, Bernadette (Bernadette Lafont), Christine (Jane Birkin), Frédérique (Elisabeth Wiener), and Martine (Emma Cohen), discover that a group of thieves who committed a robbery are keeping their stolen goods in the building across from them. The women decide to steal the goods from the men.

== Cast ==
- Jane Birkin
- Emma Cohen
- Serge Gainsbourg
- Carlo Guiffre
- Bernadette Lafont
- Elisabeth Wiener
