= Don Mendo's Revenge =

1961 film by Fernando Fernán Gómez

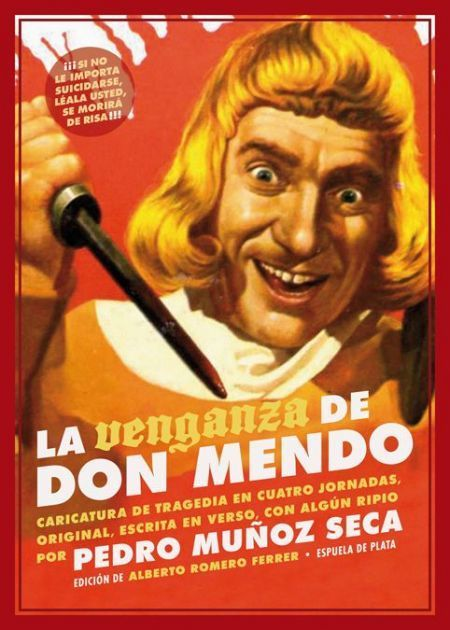
Don Mendo's Revenge, starred and directed by Fernando Fernán Gómez.

Don Mendo's Revenge (Spanish: La venganza de Don Mendo) is a 1962 Spanish comedy film directed by Fernando Fernán Gómez. It is based on a play by Pedro Muñoz Seca.

== Plot ==
Don Mendo Salazar (Fernando Fernán Gómez) sees how his beloved marries another man and he is unjustly imprisoned. Years later, he escapes and seeks revenge. Disguised as a minstrel, he manages to gather the characters who condemned him in the past and make them kill each other.

== Cast ==
- Fernando Fernán Gómez as Don Mendo Salazar - Marqués de Cabra
- Paloma Valdés as Magdalena
- Juanjo Menéndez as Don Pero Collado, Duque de Toro
- Antonio Garisa as the king Alfonso VII
- Joaquín Roa as Don Nuño Manso de Jarama
- Lina Canalejas as the Queen Berenguela
- María Luisa Ponte as Doña Ramírez
- José Vivó as Marqués de la Moncada
- Paula Martel as Azofaifa
