= Airport (1953 film) =

1953 film

- Directed by: Luis Lucia
- Written by: José Luis Colina; Enrique Llovet; Luis Lucia; José López Rubio
- Produced by: Miguel Herrero
- Starring: Fernando Fernán Gómez; Margarita Andrey; Fernando Rey
- Cinematography: Sebastián Perera
- Edited by: José Antonio Rojo
- Production company: Producciones Cinematográficas Ariel
- Distributed by: CIFESA
- Release date: 14 September 1953
- Running time: 90 minutes
- Country: Spain
- Language: Spanish

Airport (Spanish: Aeropuerto) is a 1953 Spanish comedy film directed by Luis Lucia, and starring Fernando Fernán Gómez, Margarita Andrey, and Fernando Rey.

== Plot ==
The Madrid-Barajas Airport is a constant flow of personal stories and situations. Fernando is a pilot who brings a girl to deliver her to relatives. Ceferino and his wife have won the trip to Paraguay in a contest, but they want to see the plane that will take them. Mr. Bertrán returns to Spain after many years of exile, with the tension that this entails for him.

== Cast ==
- Fernando Fernán Gómez as Luis
- Margarita Andrey as Lilliane
- Fernando Rey as Fernando
- María Asquerino as María
- María Teresa Reina as Isabel
- Manolo Morán as Bertrán
- Julia Caba Alba as Albertina
- Juan Vázquez as Ceferino
- José Isbert as Manolo
- Fernando Sancho as Mr. Fogg
- Elvira Quintillá as Florista
- Antonio Riquelme as Comisario
- José Franco as Señor Comas
- Félix Fernández as M. Lacombre
- Adriano Domínguez as Mendoza
- Manuel Arbó
- Ramón Elías as Maitre de la boite
- Casimiro Hurtado as Emilio
- Xan das Bolas
- Lola del Pino as Lola
- Ana de Leyva
- Arturo Marín as Pepe "El Tasca"
- Manuel Guitián as Camarero
- Félix Dafauce
- Manuel Dicenta as Ramón
- Valeriano Andrés as Peña
- Manuel Requena as Nemesio
- Milagros Carrión as Kioskera
- Delia Luna
- Manuel San Román as Policía
- Mercedes Muñoz Sampedro as Criada de Fernanda
- Juana Ginzo
- José Sepúlveda
- José Blanch
- Juanita Reina as Canzonetista
- Francisco Bernal as Taxista de Isabel
- Eduardo Fajardo as Man in disco
- Charito Leonís as Bailarina
- José Manuel Martín
- Antonio Ozores as Dependiente
- Ángel Álvarez as Lorenzo

== Bibliography ==
- Bentley, Bernard. A Companion to Spanish Cinema. Boydell & Brewer 2008.
