= La vida alrededor =

- Spanish theatrical release poster
- Directed by: Fernando Fernán Gómez
- Written by: Fernando Fernán Gómez; Manuel Pilares; Florentino Soria
- Starring: Fernando Fernán Gómez; Analía Gadé; Rafaela Aparicio; Manolo Morán
- Cinematography: Alfredo Fraile
- Music by: Rafael de Andrés
- Distributed by: Mercury Films
- Release date: October 8, 1959
- Running time: 102 minutes
- Country: Spain
- Language: Spanish

La vida alrededor (English: Life Around Us) is a 1959 Spanish comedy film written, starred and directed by Fernando Fernán Gómez. The movie follows La vida por delante made by the same crew in 1958.

The film is a satire about the years where housing was scarce and jobs were even scarcer, quite a contrast with the present Spain where life is easier than during the hard years when Franco ruled with an iron fist. Mr. Fernan Gomez plays Antonio, a lawyer who was not a good student and has to resort to schemes to eke a living for himself and the wife.
