= Inma de Santis =

Spanish actress (1959–1989)

- Born: Inmaculada Santiago Del Pino; 24 February 1959; Madrid, Spain
- Died: 21 December 1989 (aged 30); Villa Cisneros, Western Sahara
- Occupation: Actress
- Years active: 1965–1988

Inma de Santis (February 24, 1959 – December 21, 1989) was a Spanish film and television actress. She died on 21 December 1989 in Villa Cisneros at the age of thirty following an off-road vehicle accident while on holiday in the Sahara Desert.

== Selected filmography ==
- Another's Wife (1967)
- The Last Mercenary (1968)
- Goya, a Story of Solitude (1971)
- The Doubt (1972)
- Unmarried Mothers (1975)

== Bibliography ==
- Arantxa Aguirre Carballeira. Buñuel, lector de Galdós. Cabildo de Gran Canaria, 2006.
