= The Crossroads (1959 film) =

1960 film

- Directed by: Alfonso Balcázar
- Written by: Alfonso Balcázar; Miguel Cussó
- Produced by: Valentín Sallent
- Starring: Analía Gadé; Jean-Claude Pascal; Roberto Camardiel
- Cinematography: Alfredo Fraile
- Edited by: Juan Luis Oliver
- Music by: Juan Durán Alemany; Roman Vlad
- Production companies: Aigle Film; Balcázar Producciones Cinematográficas; Filmax; Jam Films
- Distributed by: SC Entertainment
- Release date: 1959
- Running time: 90 minutes
- Countries: France; Spain
- Language: Spanish

The Crossroads (Spanish: La encrucijada) is a 1959 French-Spanish drama film directed by Alfonso Balcázar. The story line is about a couple who try to escape to France during the Spanish Civil War.

== Cast ==
- Jaime Avellán as Father Antonio
- Enrique Borrás as Tabernero
- José María Caffarel as Martínez
- Roberto Camardiel as Max
- Carlos Casaravilla as Comandante
- Antonio Casas as Andrés
- Michel Corey as Mother of Juan
- Jean Fabris as Carlos
- Analía Gadé as Sandra
- Francisco González as Esteban
- Gaspar 'Indio' González as Sargento
- José Palomo as Juan de niño
- Roberto Palomo
- Jean-Claude Pascal as Javier
- Carlos Ronda as Pablo
- Jaime Viade

== Bibliography ==
- Àngel Comas. Diccionari de llargmetratges: el cinema a Catalunya durant la Segona República, la Guerra Civil i el franquisme (1930-1975). Cossetània Edicions, 2005.
- SOLÉ I IRLA, MARTÍ (1954). "L'épervier de Cerdagne" "Carta de Reyes" "La encrucijada": parlem de pel·lícules rodades íntegrament o en part a la Cerdanya Puigcerdà, l'autor, DL Gi 790-2020.
