= Elvira Quintillá =

Spanish actress

- Born: Elvira Quintillá Ramos; 19 September 1928; Barcelona, Catalonia, Spain
- Died: 27 December 2013 (aged 85); Madrid, Community of Madrid, Spain
- Occupation: Actress
- Years active: 1941-2004
- Spouse: José María Rodero (1947-1991; his death)

Elvira Quintillá (19 September 1928 – 27 December 2013) was a Spanish actress, whose career spanned over six decades.

Born in Barcelona, Catalonia, Quintillá began her acting career in 1941, appearing on stage. She married actor José María Rodero in 1947, and the couple remained together until Rodero's death in May 1991.

She died on 27 December 2013, aged 85, in Madrid, Community of Madrid.

== Partial filmography ==
- Fin de curso (1943)
- Arribada forzosa (1944) - Isabel
- La gran barrera (1947)
- Historia de una escalera (1950) - Carmina
- Spanish Serenade (1951) - Magdalena
- Welcome Mr. Marshall! (1953) - Señorita Eloísa, la maestra
- That Happy Couple (1953) - Carmen González Fuentes
- Airport (1953) - Florista
- Concierto mágico (1953)
- Manicomio (1954) - Mercedes
- Juzgado permanente (1954) - Amparo
- La patrulla (1954) - Julie
- The Island Princess (1954) - Tasirga
- La hermana alegría (1955) - Isabel
- El guardián del paraíso (1955) - Cecilia
- Un día perdido (1955) - Hermana Matilde
- Viaje de novios (1956) - Merche
- La frontera del miedo (1958) - Azafata
- Los tramposos (1959) - Mujer de Don Arturo
- La rana verde (1960) - Elvira
- For Men Only (1960) - Felisa
- Green Harvest (1961)
- Plácido (1961) - Emilia
- Aprendiendo a morir (1962) - Ángeles
- The Executioner (1963) - (uncredited)
- Eva 63 (1963) - Eugenia
- Fin de semana (1964) - Ángela
- El cálido verano del Sr. Rodríguez (1965)
- Lola, espejo oscuro (1966) - Mujer de Tomás
- Operación Plus Ultra (1966) - Madre de Mari Carmen
- El abuelo tiene un plan (1973) - Laura
- En la cresta de la ola (1975) - Celia
- Con mucho cariño (1977)
- La colmena (1982) - Doña Visitación
- The Autonomines (1983) - Faustina
- A la pálida luz de la luna (1985) - Teresa
- Nosotros en particular (1985) - Doña Rosaura
