= Pim, pam, pum... ¡fuego! =

- Spanish film poster
- Directed by: Pedro Olea
- Written by: Pedro Olea; Rafael Azcona
- Produced by: Katerina Niarr
- Starring: Concha Velasco; Fernando Fernán Gómez; Josep Maria Flotats; Mara Goyanes
- Cinematography: Fernando Arribas
- Edited by: José Antonio Rojo
- Music by: Carmelo A. Bernaola
- Release date: 5 September 1975
- Running time: 99 mins
- Country: Spain
- Language: Spanish

Pim, pam, pum... ¡fuego! is a 1975 Spanish drama film directed by Pedro Olea dealing with the effects of Spanish Civil War in the 1940s in Madrid. The film was one of the first that talked about the maquis. It is also the first Spanish film to be published in the Dominican Republic.
