= The Anchorite =

1976 film

- Directed by: Juan Estelrich
- Written by: Juan Estelrich; Rafael Azcona
- Starring: Fernando Fernán Gómez
- Cinematography: Alejandro Ulloa
- Edited by: Pedro del Rey
- Release date: 1976
- Running time: 108 minutes
- Countries: Spain; France
- Language: Spanish

The Anchorite (Spanish: El anacoreta) is a 1976 Spanish drama film directed by Juan Estelrich. It was entered into the 27th Berlin International Film Festival where Fernando Fernán Gómez won the Silver Bear for Best Actor.

== Plot ==
Fernando Tobajas, a middle-aged man with an advantageous economic position, decides one day to live in the bathroom, which he has modified so that it looks like a small apartment, and never leave it. He is a man who has renounced everything except his vanity, and his contacts with the world are reduced to visits from friends and the messages he sends, enclosed in tubes of aspirin, down the toilet, in the hope that someone will find them. receive and know thus that he exists. Arabel Lee, a beautiful girl, finds one of these messages; one in which this modern anchorite reflects on Saint Anthony and the Queen of Sheba. Arabel decides to visit him and play at being the Queen of Sheba, and little by little, they end up falling in love with her. Mr. Boswell, a mature English millionaire and lover of the girl, who cannot resign himself to losing her, devises a system to recover Arabel; he manages to leave the anchorite alone with her, without service and without money. They both discover that the relationship will not last long: Fernando, outside of the bathroom, would be a vulgar and uninteresting guy and, on the other hand, how would he offer Arabel the lifestyle to which she is accustomed? Fernando is willing to go out into the street, but Arabel makes him see that, if she does, she will no longer be able to love him, since the one she loves is the anchorite and not the ordinary man he would be then. Seeing no solution, Fernando convinces her to return to England and then takes his Tlife, throwing himself out of the window into the patio.

== Cast ==
- Fernando Fernán Gómez - Fernando Tobajas
- Martine Audó - Arabel Lee
- José María Mompín - Augusto
- Charo Soriano - Marisa
- Claude Dauphin - Boswell
- Maribel Ayuso - Clarita
- Eduardo Calvo - Calvo
- Ángel Álvarez - Alvarez
- Ricardo G. Lilló - Lillo (as Ricardo Lillo)
- Isabel Mestres - Sandra
- Luis Ciges - Wis-Burte
- Sergio Mendizábal
- Antonio Almorós - Norberto
- Vicente Haro - Maitre
