= El destino se disculpa =

- Spanish film poster
- Directed by: José Luis Sáenz de Heredia
- Written by: José Luis Sáenz de Heredia; Wenceslao Fernández Flórez
- Starring: Rafael Durán; María Esperanza Navarro; Fernando Fernán-Gómez; Milagros Leal; Mary Lamar; Nicolás Perchicot; Gabriel Algara
- Cinematography: Hans Scheib
- Edited by: Julio Peña
- Music by: Manuel Parada
- Release date: 25 January 1945
- Running time: 110 minutes
- Country: Spain
- Language: Spanish

El destino se disculpa is a 1945 Spanish comedy film directed by José Luis Sáenz de Heredia. It is based on the novel El fantasma ('The Ghost') written by Wenceslao Fernández Flórez who co-wrote the screenplay.
