= The Tenant (1957 film) =

- Spanish theatrical release poster
- Directed by: José Antonio Nieves Conde
- Written by: José Luis Duró; José Antonio Nieves Conde; José María Pérez Lozano; Manuel Sebares
- Starring: Fernando Fernán Gómez; Manuel Alexandre
- Cinematography: Francisco Sempere
- Edited by: Margarita de Ochoa
- Music by: Miguel Asins Arbó
- Distributed by: Delta film
- Release date: 1957
- Running time: 90 minutes
- Country: Spain
- Language: Spanish

The Tenant (Spanish: El inquilino) is a 1957 Spanish drama film directed by José Antonio Nieves Conde and starring Fernando Fernán-Gómez about how difficult it was to find an affordable flat in Madrid. At the time it was banned by Spanish censors, and when it was re-released two years later, the film was edited, the dialogue was sanitized for political purposes, and the ending was changed to a happier one. It also failed at the box office.

In the 90's, an un-cut and uncensored print was discovered and restored by Filmoteca Española (Spanish Cinemateque). The film is now considered a classic.

== Plot ==
The film takes a critical look at the issue of affordable housing in Madrid in the 1950s. It follows a family and their four children who are evicted from their flat. They try against the clock to find a new place to live while the one they are renting is torn down around them to make way for more expensive apartments. This social drama takes a daring approach during Francisco Franco's dictatorship to demonstrate the consequences of the rampant speculation in real estate that was taking place, and its effects on the lower and middles classes.

== Bibliography ==
- D'Lugo, Marvin. Guide to the Cinema of Spain. Greenwood Publishing, 1997.
