= Feroz (film) =

1984 film

- Theatrical release poster
- Directed by: Manuel Gutiérrez Aragón
- Written by: Manuel Gutiérrez Aragón; Elías Querejeta
- Produced by: Elías Querejeta
- Starring: Fernando Fernán Gómez; Frédéric de Pasquale; Elene Lizarralde; Javier García; Julio César Sanz
- Cinematography: Teo Escamilla
- Edited by: Pablo González del Amo
- Production company: Elías Querejeta PC
- Distributed by: CB Films
- Release date: 5 April 1984
- Running time: 115 minutes
- Country: Spain
- Language: Spanish

Feroz is a 1984 Spanish fantasy film directed by Manuel Gutiérrez Aragón.

== Plot ==
Pablo, a strange young man who lives only on wild berries, one day runs away from home and gets lost in the woods. A psychologist saves him from an attack by wild dogs and tries to help him with his psychological condition. He observes that the dogs become aggressive when they pass by him, as if he were vermin, and that the locals claim he is a savage. The psychologist will fight to help him and uncover the truth. He decides to take the boy to the city and, with the help of a beautiful pianist, educate him. Soon, "Bear" begins to develop tender feelings for her.

== Cast ==
- Fernando Fernán Gómez - Luis
- Frédéric de Pasquale - Andrés
- Javier García
- Elene Lizarralde - Ana
- Julio César Sanz - Pablo
- Pedro del Río
- José Antonio Gálvez - (as Antonio Gálvez)
- Matilde Grange
- Margarita Calahorra
- José Rodríguez
- María José Parra
- Mercedes Marfil
- Agustín Arranz
- Valeriano de la Llama
- Carlos Cano
- Francisco Menéndez
- Marta Suárez

== Release ==
The film was released theatrically in Spain on 5 April 1984. It also screened in the Un Certain Regard section of the 1984 Cannes Film Festival. The film proved to be a box office failure and set Gutiérrez Aragón in a path away from the fantasy genre.

== See also ==
- List of Spanish films of 1984
