= Unmarried Mothers (1975 film) =

- Directed by: Antonio del Amo
- Written by: Luis de los Arcos; Antonio del Amo
- Cinematography: Carlos Suárez
- Edited by: José Luis Berlanga
- Production company: Arturo González Producciones Cinematográficas
- Distributed by: Arturo González Producciones Cinematográficas
- Release date: 1975
- Running time: 90 minutes
- Country: Spain
- Language: Spanish

Unmarried Mothers (Spanish: Madres solteras) is a 1975 Spanish film directed by Antonio del Amo.

== Cast ==
- Rafael Alonso
- José Bódalo
- Florinda Chico
- Inma de Santis as Montse
- Paca Gabaldón
- Juan Luis Galiardo
- Charo López
- Isabel María Pérez
- Manuel Zarzo

== Bibliography ==
- de España, Rafael. Directory of Spanish and Portuguese film-makers and films. Greenwood Press, 1994.
