= El malvado Carabel (1956 film) =

The Wicked Carabel
- Directed by: Fernando Fernán Gómez
- Written by: Wenceslao Fernández Flórez (novel); Fernando Fernán Gómez; Manuel Suárez
- Produced by: Eduardo Manzanos
- Starring: Fernando Fernán Gómez; María Luz Galicia
- Music by: Salvador Ruiz de Luna
- Release date: 1956
- Country: Spain
- Language: Spanish

The Wicked Carabel (Spanish:El malvado Carabel) is a 1956 Spanish comedy film directed and also starred by Fernando Fernán Gómez about a kind and innocent man that after being fired snaps and tries to become a criminal. It was based on a novel by Wenceslao Fernández Flórez.

== Plot ==
Amaro Carabel (Fernando Fernán Gómez) is an ordinary man with a kind nature who lives with his aunt and is unable to marry his fiancée since his salary is permanently frozen. During a country race organized by his company, Carabel has a well-intentioned but indiscreet talk with one of the clients that leads to his dismissal. He then decides that the cause of his misfortunes lies in having always behaved honestly, and announces to his aunt his intention to become an evil man.

Carabel tries to carry out some misdeeds such as becoming a pickpocket, kidnapping a child, using that same child for begging, robbing a hotel or robbing a passer-by, always with disastrous results. He finally decides to rob the safe from his old company.

Carabel manages to get hold of the safe and take it home, but it is totally impossible for her to open it. Also, his fiancée, Silvia, gives him an ultimatum; she or she fixes her life in 21 days, or she will marry another man.

Knowing that his aunt is taking a correspondence course in hypnosis, Carabel desperately tries to use it to hypnotize her former bosses into giving her the key to the safe. Once there, however, the bosses, who are short of employees, decide to reinstate him in the company (with a reduction in salary). Carabel gladly accepts the offer, but unfortunately the term imposed by Silvia has expired.

Some time passes and while he corrects a letter he reads a message of love addressed to himself, when he looks up he finds that it has been written by Silvia, who has also got a job in the company and finally did not get married after all. Now that they have two salaries, the fiancés will be able to get married and Carabel definitively abandons any malevolent pretense.

== Cast ==
- Fernando Fernán Gómez as Amaro Carabel
- María Luz Galicia as Silvia
- Carmen Sánchez as mother of Silvia
- Rafael López Somoza as Gregorio
- Julia Caba Alba as Alodia
- Joaquín Roa as Cardoso
- Rosario García Ortega
- Julio Sanjuán as Giner
- Fernando Rodríguez Molina as Camí
- Manuel Alexandre as Dr. Solás
