= We're All Necessary =

1956 film

- Directed by: José Antonio Nieves Conde
- Written by: Faustino González Aller; José Antonio Nieves Conde
- Cinematography: Francisco Sempere
- Edited by: Franco Fraticelli
- Music by: Miguel Asins Arbó
- Distributed by: Variety Distribution
- Release date: 10 September 1956
- Running time: 84 minutes
- Countries: Italy; Spain
- Language: Spanish

We're All Necessary (Spanish: Todos somos necesarios, Italian: Ritorno alla vita) is a 1956 Italian-Spanish drama film directed by José Antonio Nieves Conde, starring Alberto Closas, Folco Lulli, Lída Baarová and Ferdinand Anton. It tells the story of three men who are released from prison and have doubts and regrets regarding their place in society. The film was a co-production with an Italian company. It competed in the Spanish section at the 1956 San Sebastián International Film Festival, where it won the awards for Best Film, Best Director, Best Screenplay and Best Actor (Closas).

== Cast ==
- Alberto Closas - An ex surgeon
- Folco Lulli - A thief
- Manuel Alexandre - The employee of the train
- Jose Marco Davo
- Ferdinand Anton
- Lída Baarová - A secretary
- Francisco Bernal
- Rafael Calvo Revilla
- Rafael Durán
- Albert Hehn
- Josephine Kipper
- Rainer Penkert

== Bibliography ==
- D'Lugo, Marvin. Guide to the Cinema of Spain. Greenwood Publishing, 1997.
