= Jaime Chávarri =

Spanish film director and screenwriter

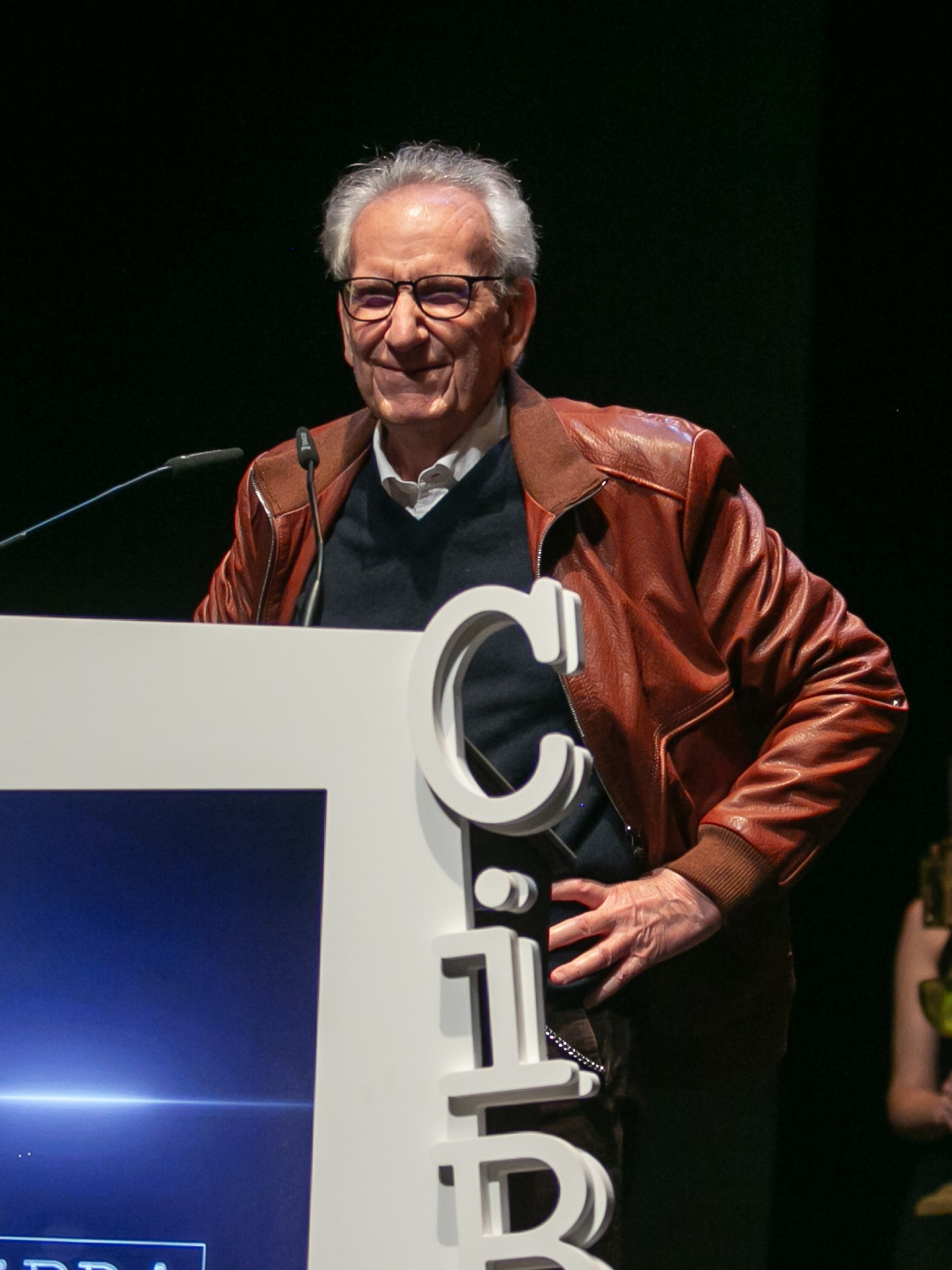
- Attending the CiBRA Festival closing gala in 2023
- Born: Jaime Chávarri de la Mora; 20 March 1943 (age 83); Madrid, Spain
- Occupation: Filmmaker
- Years active: 1967–present
- Relatives: Antonio Maura (great-grandfather); Constancia de la Mora (aunt)

Jaime Chávarri (born 20 March 1943) is a Spanish film director and screenwriter, best known for his films El desencanto and Las bicicletas son para el verano.

== Life and career ==
Chávarri's family belonged to the haute bourgeoisie. His mother Marichu de la Mora y Maura (maternal granddaughter of Antonio Maura) was a Falangist Sección Femenina activist and a fashion journalist. His aunt was Republican activist Constancia de la Mora. Chávarri had already graduated as a lawyer, when he entered the Escuela Oficial de Cine (EOC) in 1968. He abandoned his formal film studies in his second year, moving into film criticism. He wrote for Film Ideal magazine. His first film industry job was an assistant director to José Luis Borau. while devoting his spare time to make two feature-length films in super 8: Run, Blancanieves, Run in 1967, and Ginebra en los infiernos in 1969. He worked with Ivan Zulueta in his series for Spanish television named Último grito (or The Last Cry), and subsequently scripted Un dos tres... al escondite inglés (Hide and Seek) in 1969. Over the next several years, he worked on the technical crew of a number of films and collaborated with Spanish cult film director Jesús Franco on the script for Franco's 1970 opus, Vampyros Lesbos. In 1970, he completed hi first short feature film 'Estado de sitio' (or Siege State). He also contributed one segment to the collective film, Pastel de sangre (Blood Pie) in 1971 with Francesc Bellmunt.

Chávarri's first feature-length film as a director was Los viajes escolares (or School Trips) in 1974, a complex autobiographical film that focuses on the ambiance of a dysfunctional family. It was shown at Valladolid International Film Festival and got a mixed reception. Critics recognized the director's talent but criticized the obscure symbolism of the film. Two years later, Chávarri continued the theme of the dysfunctional family with the documentary El desencanto (or The Disenchantment) in 1976, which portraits the family of the deceased Francoist poet Leopoldo Panero, capturing the visceral relations forged out of the patriarchal tyranny in the poet's three sons and widow. Chávarri's next film was the highly praised A Un dios desconocido, To An Unknown God in 1977, which tells the story of a solitary aging gay magician in Granada who remembers his youthful romance with Federico García Lorca. The film, written with producer Elías Querejeta and with notable work by cinematographer Teodoro Escamilla, was highly praised, winning the leading actor and director prizes at the 1977 San Sebastián International Film Festival.

Chávarri's subsequent film, Dedicatoria (or Dedicated to...) in 1980, another collaboration with Elías Querejeta, centers on Juan Uribe, played by José Luis Gómez, a journalist whose interrogation of his comrade, Luis Falcón, a political prisoner, leads him to discover the incestuous relation between Falcón and his daughter, the same woman with whom Juan is having sexual relations. Like earlier Chávarri's films, Dedicated to... was praised for its uncompromising thematic and artistry, but it failed at the box office.

By the early 1980s, Chávarri embarked on a series of film adaptations of diverse fictional works which lent a seeming randomness and lack of focus to his development as a filmmaker. In 1983 he directed a lavish adaptation of Llorenç Villalonga's novel, Bearn o la sala de las muñecas (or Bearn or the Dolls Room) and followed that with a screen version of Fernando Fernán Gómez's war play Las bicicletas son para el verano (or Bicycles Are for the Summer) in 1984. Also in 1984, he had a cameo part as an Exhibitionist in Pedro Almodóvar's film What Have I Done to Deserve This? Then in 1985, he wrote and directed his most personal film El río de oro (or The Golden River), which is based on the Peter Pan stories.

The success of Las bicicletas son para el verano led Chávarri to turn his career from making independent films to more commercial ones. In 1988, he adapted for television Yo soy el que tú buscas, which is based on a Gabriel García Márquez novel of the same name. His musical-drama set in the 1930s postwar Madrid, Las cosas del querer (or The Things of Love) in 1989. It features many folklore songs of the 30s and 40s and co-stars Ángela Molina as 'Pepita' (an aspiring copla singer) and Amparo Baró as 'Balbina'. It became one of his biggest commercial successes. In Spain, it was the 6th most popular Spanish film in 1989, but outside Spain it is still mostly unknown. In 1990 he returned to television and made a literary adaption of Jorge Luis Borges's short story, La intrusa.

In 1993, he made the comedy Tierno verano de lujuria y azoteas (or Tender Summer of Lust and Rooftops) based on the novel by Pablo Solozábal. The film explores the sexual awakening of a young man played by Gabino Diego, who is obsessed with his much older cousin Olga, played by Marisa Paredes. This was followed by a sequel: Las cosas del querer. Part II, set in Argentina in 1995, made for the producer Luis Sanz. It was less successful than its predecessor.

Chávarri's films in the 1990s, Gran slalom in 1996 (comedy about love and intrigue,) and Sus ojos se cerraron y el mundo sigue andando (or Tangos are For Two) in 1997 (about a woman who dreams while listening to tango music of Carlos Gardel) did not do well commercially. The director did better with Kisses for Everyone in 2000, a comedy set in the 1960s about three medical students in Cádiz, starring Emma Suárez, Eloy Azorín, and Pilar López de Ayala. In 2004, 'El año del diluvio' was released, based on the novel by Eduardo Mendoza Garriga novel of the same name, set in the '50s about a mother superior in a charity hospital and a rich landowner, who is trying to get funds to open a nursing home. His film Camarón (Camarón: When Flamenco Became Legend) in 2005, a biopic of the flamenco singer Camarón de la Isla played by Óscar Jaenada, also was well regarded. The film won 3 Goya Awards including the award for best actor to Óscar Jaenada.

== Filmography ==
Year	English title	Original title	Notes
1973	School Trips	Los viajes escolares	
1976	The Disenchantment	El desencanto	Documentary
1977	To an Unknown God	A un dios desconocido	Best Director San Sebastián International Film Festival
1979	Tales for an escape	Cuentos para una escapada	segment The Deaf Woman
1979	Erotic Tales	Cuentos eróticos	segment Pequeño planeta
1980	Dedicated to	Dedicatoria	
1982	Bearn or the Dolls Room	Bearn o la sala de las muñecas	
1983	Bicycles Are for the Summer	Las bicicletas son para el verano	
1985	The Golden River	El río de oro	
1989	The Things of Love	Las cosas del querer	
1993	Tender Summer of Lust and Rooftops	Tierno verano de lujurias y azoteas	
1995	The Things of Love. Part II	Las cosas del querer. 2ª parte	
1996	Gran Slalom	Gran slalom	
1997	Tangos Are for Two	Sus ojos se cerraron y el mundo sigue andando	
2000	Kisses for Everyone	Besos para todos	
2004	The Year of the Flood	El año del diluvio	
2004	Madrid M11: We Were All on That Train	Madrid 11M: Todos íbamos en ese tren	segment Doce de octubre
2005	Camarón: When Flamenco Became Legend	Camarón	
2022	—	La manzana de oro	
