= Bicycles Are for the Summer (film) =

1984 Spanish film dir. Jaime Chávarri

Las bicicletas son para el verano
- Directed by: Jaime Chávarri
- Written by: Fernando Fernán Gómez; Enrique Paradas; Lola Salvador (as Salvador Maldonado); Rafael Sepúlveda
- Starring: Amparo Soler Leal; Agustín González; Victoria Abril; Marisa Paredes; Gabino Diego; Alicia Hermida; Patricia Adriani
- Cinematography: Miguel Ángel Trujillo
- Release date: 1984
- Running time: 103 minutes
- Country: Spain
- Language: Spanish

Bicycles Are for the Summer (Spanish: Las bicicletas son para el verano) is a 1984 Spanish war drama film directed by Jaime Chávarri and based on the homonym play by Fernando Fernán Gómez. It is about the life of a family during the Spanish Civil War. The photography started in July 1983 and it was distributed by Incine. It was shot in Madrid.

== Plot ==
Unexpected things happen, but people find ways to survive. Above all, it is a story of survival and adaptation: the bicycle symbolises Luisito's innocence disappearing as at the beginning he wants a bicycle to hang out with his friends and meet girls but by the end due to the horror of the war Luisito had to grow up and become the man of the house and his bike symbolises responsibilities he has to have for his family.

== Cast ==
- Amparo Soler Leal as Dolores
- Agustín González as Luis
- Victoria Abril as Manolita
- Alicia Hermida as Antonia
- Patricia Adriani as María
- Marisa Paredes as Doña María Luisa
- Carlos Tristancho as Julio
- Gabino Diego as Luisito
- Aurora Redondo as Marcela
- Guillermo Marín as Don Simón
- Emilio Gutiérrez Caba as Anselmo
- Laura del Sol as Bailarina
- Miguel Rellán as Basilio
- Jorge de Juan as Pedrito
- Marina Saura as Rosa
- Will More as Actor
- Rosa Menéndez as Actriz
- Emilio Serrano as Pablo
- Elena Gortari as Maluli
- Sandra Ramírez as Charito
- Marina Andina
