= Emma Cohen =

Spanish actress and director (1946–2016)

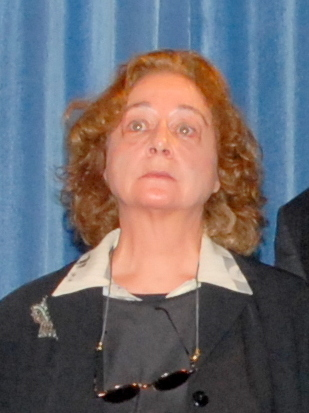
- Cohen in 2008
- Born: Emmanuela Beltrán Rahola; 21 November 1946; Barcelona, Francoist Spain
- Died: 11 July 2016 (aged 69); Madrid, Spain
- Other name: Emma Silva
- Occupations: Actress; director; producer; screenwriter
- Years active: 1967–2016
- Spouse: Fernando Fernán Gómez (m. 2000; died 2007)

Emmanuela Beltrán Rahola (21 November 1946 – 11 July 2016), better known as Emma Cohen, was a Spanish actress, director, producer, and writer. She appeared in many Spanish language films. She portrayed Gallina Caponata, a counterpart to Big Bird, in Barrio Sésamo, the Spanish version of Sesame Street.

== Personal life ==
Emma Cohen was married to actor Fernando Fernán Gómez from 2000 until his death in 2007. She died on 11 July 2016, aged 69, after a battle with cancer.

== Selected filmography ==
- Tuset Street (1967)
- El extraño caso del doctor Fausto (1969)
- Hembra/ Female (1970)
- Growing Leg, Diminishing Skirt (1970)
- The Man Who Wanted to Kill Himself (1970)
- The Glass Ceiling (1971) an Italian giallo
- Spaniards in Paris (1971)
- The Legend of Frenchie King (1971)
- Trop jolies pour être honnêtes (1972)
- The Cannibal Man (1972) directed by Eloy de la Iglesia
- Horror Rises from the Tomb (1973) directed by Paul Naschy
- The Other Side of the Mirror (1973) directed by Jesus Franco
- Cry, Onion! (1975)
- La cruz del diablo (1975) directed by John Gilling
- The Strange Love of the Vampires (1975) directed by Leon Klimovsky
