= Agustín González (actor) =

Spanish actor

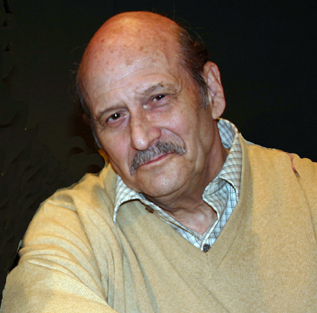
- Agustín González in September 2004
- Born: Agustín González Martínez; 24 March 1930; Linares (Jaén), Spain
- Died: 16 January 2005 (aged 74); Madrid, Spain
- Occupation: Actor
- Partners: María Luisa Ponte; María Asquerino; Pilar Bardem; Maite de la Cruz
- Relatives: Manuel González Martínez

Agustín González Martínez (24 March 1930 in Linares – 16 January 2005 in Madrid) was a Spanish actor who appeared in more than 180 films, including El nido (1980), by Jaime de Armiñan; Volver a empezar (1981), by José Luis Garci; La colmena (1982), by Mario Camús; Dos mejor que uno (1984), by Ángel Llorente and Las bicicletas son para el verano (1984), by Fernando Fernán Gómez.

== Biography ==
He was brother of Manuel González, one of the members of Los Brincos.

He started several university studies in Engineering and Philosophy and Literature, but he didn't finish. He started his career as an actor in the Teatro Español Universitario, where he stayed several years during his stage as a student. He grew as one of the most important Spanish actors thanks to his theatre performances and cinema directors such as Carlos Saura, Juan Antonio Bardem, Mario Camus or Fernando Fernán Gómez. He worked in 140 movies, theatre plays and TV series. From 1954 to 1986, he had a relationship with the actress María Luisa Ponte, 12 years older than he was, but they never got married. His last film was Tiovivo 1950, by José Luis Garci. His last theatre play was Tres hombres y un destino, in Madrid, but he had to be replaced because of his sickness. He died on 16 January 2005 of pneumonia in the clinic La Zarzuela, in Madrid, at aged 74.

== Prizes ==
- Medalla de Oro de Bellas Artes, 1983.
- Mejor actor por Las Bicicletas son para el verano, 1984.
- Premio Calabuch for La marrana.
- Premio Festival de Cine de Peñíscola for Belle Époque.
- Golden Medalla al Mérito en el Trabajo by the Spanish Government in 2004.

== Filmography ==
In his filmography, he appears in humorous and dramatic films and he has been considered one of the best Spanish actors in supporting roles

=== Film ===
- Caricias (1998)
- Felices Pascuas (1954, by Juan Antonio Bardem)
- Mi calle (1960, by Edgar Neville)
- Plácido (1961, by Luis García Berlanga)
- The Mustard Grain (1962)
- The Fair of the Dove (1963)
- La becerrada (1963)
- De cuerpo presente (1965, by Antonio Eceiza)
- That Man in Istanbul (1965)
- The Regent's Wife (1975)
- La escopeta nacional (1978, by Berlanga)
- Companys, procés a Catalunya (1979)
- Patrimonio nacional (1980, by Berlanga)
- El nido (1980, by Jaime de Armiñán)
- Gary Cooper, Who Art in Heaven (1980)
- Gary Cooper, que estás en los cielos (1980)
- Volver a empezar (1981, by José Luis Garci)
- Nacional III (1982, by Berlanga)
- La colmena (1982, by Mario Camús)
- Las bicicletas son para el verano (1983, written by Fernando Fernán Gómez)
- Hay que deshacer la casa (1983)
- Dos mejor que uno (1984, by Ángel Llorente)
- La vaquilla (1984)
- Crimen en familia (1985)
- La corte de Faraón (1985, by José Luis García Sánchez)
- Stico (1985)
- A la luz de la luna (1985, by González Sinde)
- Redondela (1986, by Pedro Costa)
- Mambrú se fue a la guerra (1986)
- El hermano bastardo de Dios (1986)
- Moros y cristianos (1987)
- Gran sol (1989)
- La marrana (1992, by José Luis Cuerda)
- Después del sueño (1992)
- Aquí, el que no corre... vuela (1992)
- Belle Époque (1992, second Academy Award in Spanish history, by Fernando Trueba)
- Todos a la cárcel (1993)
- Los peores años de nuestra vida (1994, by Emilio Martínez Lázaro)
- Así en el Cielo como en la Tierra (1995, by José Luis Cuerda)
- La Ley de la frontera (1995)
- El abuelo (1998, by José Luis Garci)
- Historia de un beso (2002, by José Luis Garci)
- Tiovivo c. 1950 (2004, by José Luis Garci)

=== TV series ===
- Cervantes (1981) - Luis de Góngora (uncredited)
- Escalera exterior, escalera interior (1986) - Don Horacio
- Los ladrones van a la oficina (1993)
- A las once en casa (1998-1999) - Don Ramón
- Cuéntame cómo pasó (2002) - Teodoro
- La vida de Rita (2003) - Fernando
- 7 vidas (2003) - Emilio Freire
- Hospital Central (2004) - Damián Corcuera
