= Fernando Fernán Gómez =

Spanish actor and film director (1921–2007)

The Most Excellent Fernando Fernán Gómez OAXS
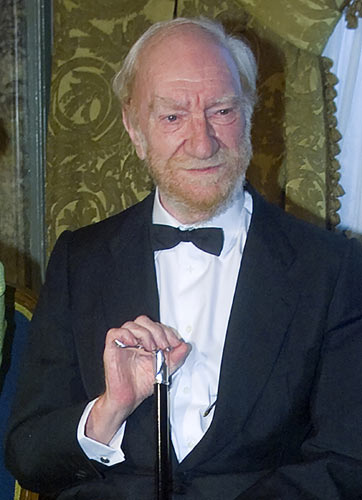
- Born: Fernando Fernández Gómez; 28 August 1921; Lima, Peru
- Died: 21 November 2007 (aged 86); Madrid, Spain
- Resting place: Cementerio de la Almudena, Madrid
- Citizenship: Argentina; Spain
- Occupations: Actor; director; writer
- Years active: 1943–2006
- Spouse(s): María Dolores Pradera (m. 1945; div. 1957) Emma Cohen (m. 2000)
- Children: 2
- Parents: Fernando Díaz de Mendoza y Guerrero (father); Carola Fernán-Gómez (mother)
- Relatives: Fernando Díaz de Mendoza (grandfather); María Guerrero (grandmother)

Seat B of the Real Academia Española
- In office 30 January 2000 – 21 November 2007
- Preceded by: Emilio Alarcos Llorach
- Succeeded by: José Luis Borau

Fernando Fernández Gómez OAXS (28 August 1921 – 21 November 2007), better known as Fernando Fernán Gómez, was a Spanish actor, screenwriter, film director, theater director, novelist, and playwright. Prolific in all these fields, he was elected member of the Royal Spanish Academy in 1998. He was born in Lima, Peru while his mother, Spanish actress Carola Fernán-Gómez, was making a tour in Latin America. He would later use her surname for his stage name when he moved to Spain in 1924.

Fernán Gómez was regarded as one of Spain's most beloved and respected entertainers, winning two Silver Bears for Best Actor at the Berlin International Film Festival for his roles in The Anchorite in 1977 and Stico in 1985. He was also the recipient of the Prince of Asturias Award for the Arts, the National Theater Award, the Gold Medal of Merit in the Fine Arts, the Gold Medal of the Spanish Film Academy, and six Goya Awards. He starred in 200 films between 1943 and 2006, working with directors including Carlos Saura (Ana and the Wolves, Mama Turns 100), Víctor Erice (The Spirit of the Beehive), Fernando Trueba (Belle Époque), José Luis Garci (The Grandfather), José Luis Cuerda (Butterfly's Tongue) and Pedro Almodóvar (All About My Mother).

He directed over 25 films, among them El extraño viaje (1964), and Life Goes On (1965), both great classics of the Spanish cinema that were very limited distribution due to Franco's censorship and made him a cursed filmmaker in his country. His film Voyage to Nowhere (1986), which is based on his own novel, earned critical acclaim and became the most awarded Spanish film at the 1st Goya Awards ceremony.

== Early life ==
According to his memoir, he was probably born in Lima on 28 August 1921, even though his birth certificate indicates that he was born in the Argentine capital, Buenos Aires. His mother, the theater actress Carola Fernán Gómez, was touring South America when he was born in Lima, and his birth certificate was issued days later in Argentina, a country whose nationality he retained, in addition to Spanish nationality, which was granted to him in 1984. He was an extramarital son, his father was also the actor Luis Fernando Díaz de Mendoza y Guerrero, whose mother, the prominent theater actress María Guerrero, prevented the marriage between Fernando Fernán Gómez's parents.

== Career ==
=== Acting and filmmaking ===
After some performing school works, he decided to study Philosophy and Letters in Madrid, which he subsequently abandoned when the Spanish Civil War began, but his true vocation led him to the theater. During the Civil War he received classes at the CNT School of Actors, making his professional debut in 1938 at the Laura Pinillos' company. There he was discovered by the Spanish playwright Enrique Jardiel Poncela, who offered him his first major opportunity in 1941, the role as "Redhead" in the play We Thieves Are Honourable.

In 1943, Fernán Gómez joined the film studio Cifesa and made his first movie appearance in Cristina Guzmán, directed by Gonzalo Delgrás. Between the 1940s and 1960s, he established himself as a leading actor in the Spanish film industry, mostly in comic roles: El destino se disculpa (1945), Anchor Button (1948), The Last Horse (1950), I Want to Marry You (1951), Captain Poison (1951), The Pelegrín System (1952), That Happy Couple (1953), Airport (1953), Nobody Will Know (1953), The Other Life of Captain Contreras (1955), Faustina (1957), and La becerrada (1963). He also revealed his ability to play drama in Carnival Sunday (1945), Life in Shadows (1948), Reckless (1951), The Tenant (1957), and Rififi in the City (1964). During his career he occasionally play supporting roles in such foreign films as Voice of Silence (1953), The Bachelor (1955), starring Alberto Sordi, The Pyjama Girl Case (1977), with Ray Milland, and Marcellino pane e vino (1991).

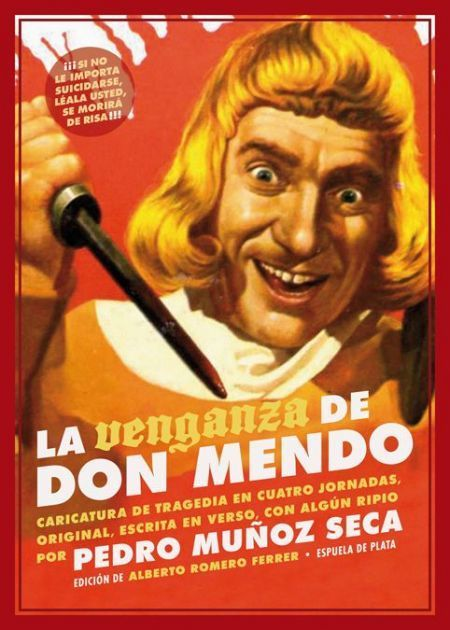
Fernán Gómez as Don Mendo Salazar in Don Mendo's Revenge (1962)

In the 1950s he began to direct movies, earning a nomination for Best Film at the Mar del Plata International Film Festival for his 1958 comedy La vida por delante, a story about the difficulties that a newly married couple has in moving forward with their housing, work and economic life. The film pioneered in Spain in breaking the fourth wall and telling the plot in the form of flashbacks and its success led him to made a sequel, La vida alrededor (1959). His first films tended to be humorous satires, including The Wicked Carabel (1956), For Men Only (1960), and Don Mendo's Revenge (1962), a film adaptation of the play of the same name by Pedro Muñoz Seca that was highly acclaimed at the time. In 1964 he filmed El extraño viaje, a dark portrait of Spanish rural repression. It was voted seventh best Spanish film by professionals and critics in 1996 Spanish cinema centenary, and included in a British Film Institute list published in 2016 by film director Pedro Almodóvar among the 13 great Spanish films that inspired him. The latter was followed by Life Goes On (1965), one of the most terrifying and merciless moral portraits of Francoist Spain.

He was very much in demand as an actor in the 1970s and 1980s, expanding his range in many films of the new Spanish cinema: starring alongside Geraldine Chaplin in Carlos Saura's Ana and the Wolves (1973) and its sequel Mama Turns 100 (1979), The Love of Captain Brando (1974), Pim, pam, pum... ¡fuego! (1975), The Remains from the Shipwreck (1978), Maravillas (1981), Feroz (1984), The Court of the Pharaoh (1985), Requiem for a Spanish Peasant (1985), Half of Heaven (1986), Moors and Christians (1987), and in the title role of Leopoldo de Gregorio, 1st Marquess of Esquilache in Esquilache (1989). In 1973 he starred in Víctor Erice's The Spirit of the Beehive, reaching an international audience for his role as a mournful intellectual father who has a small beehive inside his house. That same year he played Don Quixote in the Spanish-Mexican comedy Don Quijote cabalga de nuevo, co-starring Cantinflas as Sancho Panza. In 1977, he won the Silver Bear for Best Actor at the 27th Berlin International Film Festival for his role as a middle-aged man who decides one day to live in the bathroom and never leave it in The Anchorite, and again at the 35th Berlin International Film Festival in 1985 for his role as a broke Roman law professor who offers himself as a slave to an old student in exchange for house and food in Stico. He also won the Pasinetti Prize for Best Actor for his role in Carlos Saura's film The Stilts (1984) at the 41st Venice International Film Festival.

He directed and starred in two notable productions for Televisión Española: the fantasy TV movie Juan soldado, which he won the Grand Prix for Best Director at the 9th International Television Festival Golden Prague in 1973, and the 1974 miniseries El pícaro, a historical comedy set in the 17th Century which was based on the picaresque novel. As a filmmaker he made, among others, My Daughter Hildegart (1977), a film inspired in the life of Spanish activist Hildegart Rodríguez Carballeira, which turned out to be a box office hit in Spain, Mambru Went to War (1986), that gave him his first Goya Award for Best Actor, Voyage to Nowhere (1986), based on his novel published in 1985 which describes a troupe of impoverished actors traipsing from village to village, achieving the Goya Awards for Best Film, Best Director and Best Adapted Screenplay in 1987, and The Sea and Time (1989), winner of the Special Jury Prize at the 1989 San Sebastián International Film Festival.

The 1990s was a less active acting period for him, but he enjoyed something of a revival, featuring in five major projects: the historical co-production The Dumbfounded King (1991), the two winners of the Academy Award for Best Foreign Language Film Belle Époque (1992) and All About My Mother (1999), The Grandfather (1998), which he won a second Goya Award for Best Actor in 1999 for his praised role as Don Rodrigo, Count of Albrit, an old Spanish aristocrat, and the hit Butterfly's Tongue (1999), playing Don Gregorio, a republican schoolteacher. In between, he was part of the cast of the comedy show Los ladrones van a la oficina (The thieves go to the office, 1993–1996), awarded an Onda Award in 1993.

In 1999 the San Sebastián International Film Festival granted to him the Donostia Award, which made him the first Spanish movie-maker to receive this distinction.

In the 2000s he appeared in Plenilune (2000), Visionaries (2001), the popular prime time television series Cuéntame cómo pasó (Remember When, 2001), The Shanghai Spell (2002), Tiovivo c. 1950 (2004), and Something to Remember Me By (2005). One of his last great performances was in the film In the City Without Limits (2002), again with Geraldine Chaplin, where he plays a dying man who suffered fearful delusions. The last film he directed was Lázaro de Tormes (2001), from which he received his second Goya Award for Best Adapted Screenplay.

In 2005 he was awarded with the Honorary Golden Bear at the 55th Berlin International Film Festival for his lifetime achievement.

=== Stage and literary work ===
In addition to his extensive career in front and behind the screen, Fernán Gómez wrote numerous stage plays, novels, memoirs, articles, and poems. The most successful was the play Las bicicletas son para el verano (Bicycles Are for the Summer) in 1977, showing the sufferings of a family and their neighbours in besieged Madrid during the Civil War. He won the Lope de Vega Prize for that work in 1978, and it has been adapted into a popular film in 1984, directed by Jaime Chávarri.

As theater director he staged plays such as Dear Liar (1962), by Bernard Shaw; The Kreutzer Sonata (1963), by Leo Tolstoy; Thought (1963), by Leonid Andreyev; and Juan José Alonso Millán's comedies Gravemente peligrosa (1962), Mayores con reparos (1965) and La vil seducción (1967).

He was runner up of the Premio Planeta de Novela for his 1987 historical novel El mal amor. In 1993 he won the Premio de Novela Espasa-Humor for his comedy novel El ascensor de los borrachos.

In 1990 he published his memoirs, El Tiempo Amarillo (The Yellow Time), which he later expanded in a second edition in 1998 named El Tiempo Amarillo: memorias ampliadas (1921-1997). The work has 700 pages and was presented at the Círculo de Bellas Artes in Madrid. On October 27, 1995, he received the Prince of Asturias Award for the Arts from the hands of Prince Felipe.

On January 30, 2000, he entered the Royal Spanish Academy for his artistic accomplishments, where he took possession of Seat B with the speech titled "Aventura de la palabra en el siglo xx".

== Personal life, death and legacy ==
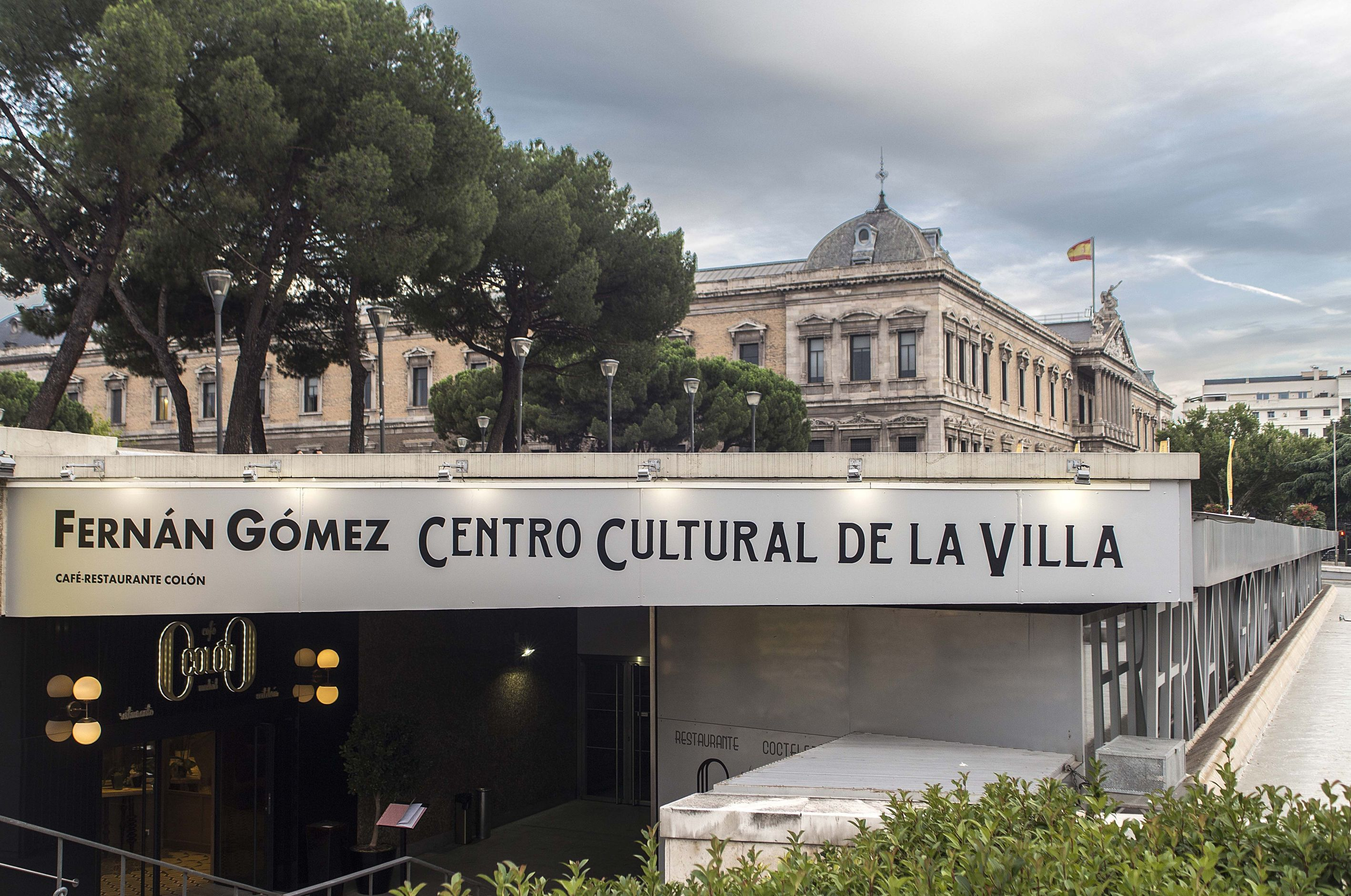
Entrance to the Fernán Gómez Theater. Madrid

He married the Spanish actress and singer María Dolores Pradera in 1945, with whom he had a daughter, the actress Helena Fernán Gómez, and a son, Fernando. They divorced in 1957. Later then, he had a long relationship with actress Emma Cohen, marrying in 2000.

Fernando Fernán Gómez died in Madrid on 21 November 2007 from a heart failure aggravated by pneumonia and colon cancer. On 19 November 2007, he was admitted to the Oncology area of the Madrid University Hospital La Paz to be treated for pneumonia. Carmen Caffarel, head of the Instituto Cervantes, said "We've lost the great man of Spanish theater and film of the second half of the 20th century".

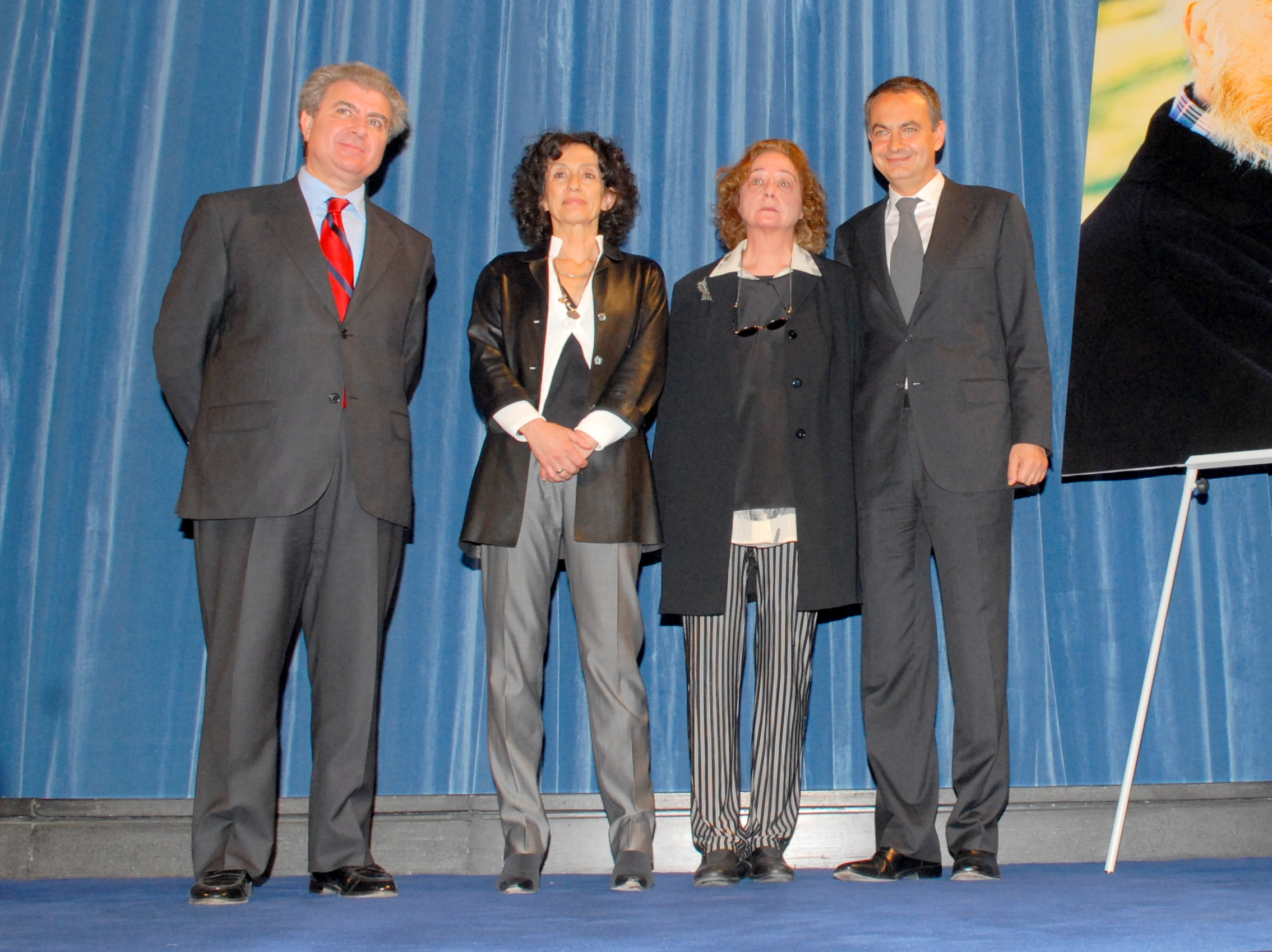
Emma Cohen received the Grand Cross of the Civil Order of Alfonso X the Wise in 2008 awarded to Fernando Fernán Gómez posthumously.

Pedro Almodóvar highlighted him as "an artist who represents the history of Spanish cinema from its beginnings to the present day." The "excellence" in all his work, Almodóvar noted, was felt in his work as an actor: "He made the difficult as easy as possible, thanks to limitless versatility". That made him capable of "going from Don Mendo's Revenge on Bertolt Brecht". But he was also an "essential director in both film and theater", to the point of being "a complete and irreplaceable artist." "With delightful comedies such as La vida por delante and La vida alrededor, or the very scathing and masterpiece El extraño viaje". Concluding "I will always remember him, and I will continue watching his films".

After the President of the Government José Luis Rodríguez Zapatero announced the death of the actor, the Government of Spain posthumously awarded Fernán Gómez the Grand Cross of the Civil Order of Alfonso X, the Wise on 23 November. The mayor of Madrid, Alberto Ruiz-Gallardón, also announced that the Cultural Center of the Villa de Madrid would be renamed the Fernán Gómez Theater. As he was a lifelong anarchist, his coffin was covered in a black and red anarchist flag and was later cremated in the Almudena Cemetery in Madrid.

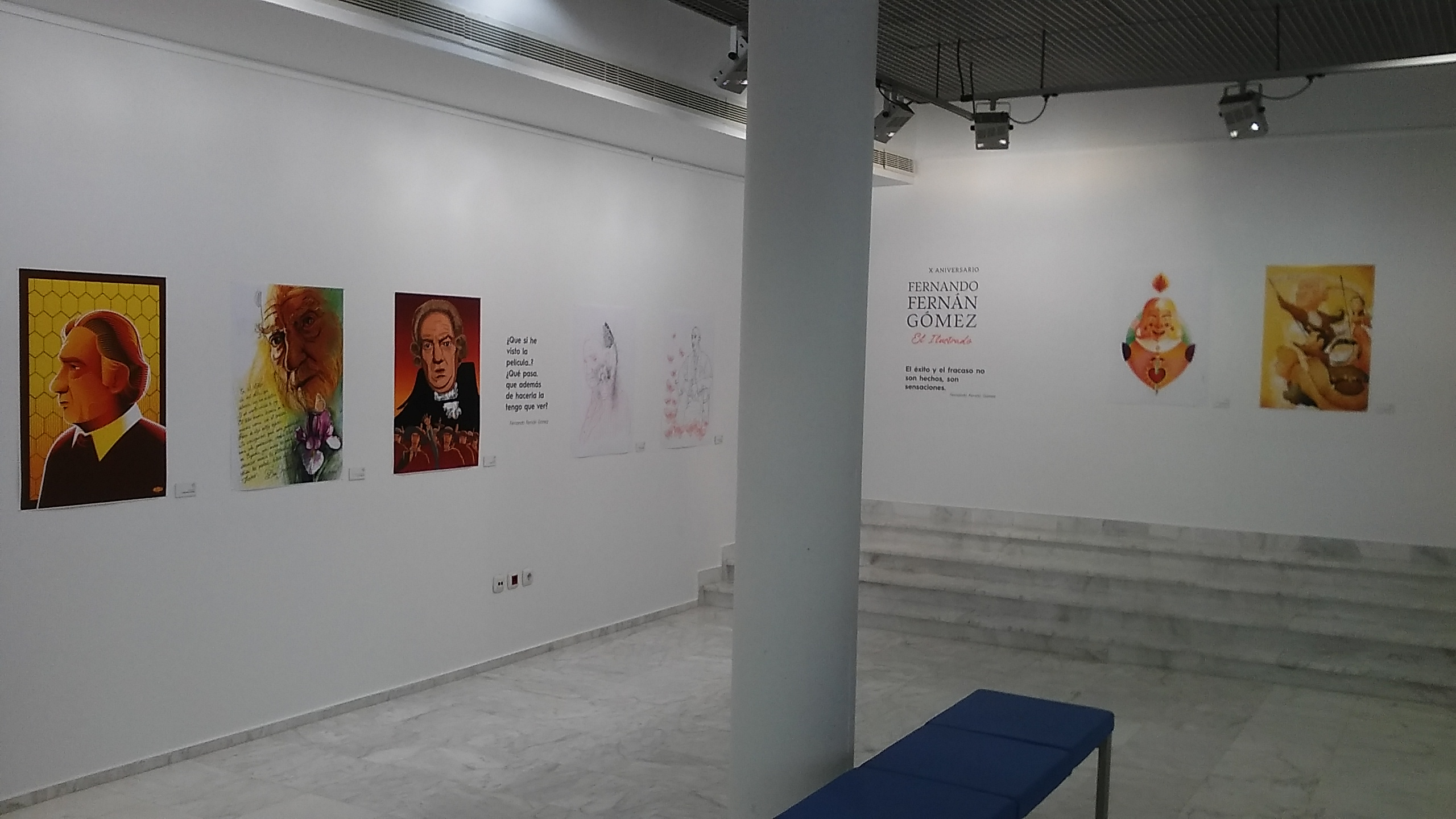
Fernando Fernán Gómez exhibition at the Jerez Campus, University of Cádiz in 2017.

In 2017, in commemoration of the 10 years since his death, the exhibition Fernando Fernán Gómez "El Ilustrado" was inaugurated by the graphic artists of the Association of Cadiz Illustrators at the University of Cádiz.

On 3 March 2022, the Instituto Cervantes received the "in memoriam" legacy of Fernán Gómez: his 1938 CNT card and the pen that was given to him when he entered the Royal Spanish Academy in 2000. The legacy was introduced into Box number 1003 of the Caja de las Letras by Fernán-Gómez's granddaughter, Helena de Llanos.

In 2023, the Spanish Government acquired the archive of Fernando Fernán Gómez and his wife Emma Cohen, which is made up of 250 boxes and other objects that are already kept in the facilities of the Filmoteca Española, entity dependent on the Institute of Cinematography and Audiovisual Arts (ICAA).

== Filmography ==
=== Film ===
==== Writer and Director ====
Year	Title	Director	Writer	Notes
1954	Manicomio	Yes	Yes	Co-directed with Luis María Delgado
1955	El mensaje	Yes	Yes	
1956	El malvado Carabel	Yes	Yes	
1958	La vida por delante	Yes	Yes	
1959	La vida alrededor	Yes	Yes	
1960	Sólo para hombres	Yes	Yes	
1961	La venganza de Don Mendo	Yes	Yes	
1964	El mundo sigue	Yes	Yes	
1964	Los palomos	Yes	Yes	
1964	El extraño viaje	Yes	No	
1965	Ninette y un señor de Murcia	Yes	Yes	
1966	Mayores con reparos	Yes	Yes	
1970	Crimen imperfecto	Yes	No	
1971	Cómo casarse en 7 días	Yes	Yes	
1974	Yo la vi primero	Yes	Yes	
1976	La querida	Yes	No	
1976	¡Bruja, más que bruja!	Yes	Yes	
1977	Mi hija Hildegart	Yes	Yes	
1979	Gulliver	No	Yes	
1980	Cinco tenedores	Yes	No	
1984	Los Zancos	No	Yes	
1985	Stico	No	Yes	
1986	Mambrú se fue a la guerra	Yes	No	
1986	El viaje a ninguna parte	Yes	Yes	Also based on his novel
1987	Mi General	No	Yes	
1989	El mar y el tiempo	Yes	Yes	Also based on his novel
1991	Fuera de juego	Yes	Yes	
1994	Siete mil días juntos	Yes	Yes	
1997	Pesadilla para un rico	Yes	Yes	
2001	Lázaro de Tormes	Yes	Yes	Co-directed with José Luis García Sánchez; Final film

==== Acting roles ====
Year	Title	Role	Director	Notes
1943	Cristina Guzmán	Bob	Gonzalo Delgrás	
1943	Autumn Roses	Adolfo Barona	Juan de Orduña and Eduardo Morera	
1943	Fantastic Night	Enamorado	Luis Marquina	
1943	La chica del gato	Paco	Ramón Quadreny	
1943	Viviendo al revés		Ignacio F. Iquino	
1943	A Palace for Sale		Ladislao Vajda	
1943	Fin de curso	Himself (uncredited)	Ignacio F. Iquino	
1944	Turbante blanco		Ignacio F. Iquino	
1944	Una chica de opereta	Salvador Viana	Ramón Quadreny	
1944	Mi enemigo y yo	Antonio Aguilar 'Tony'	Ramón Quadreny	
1944	Empezó en boda		Raffaello Matarazzo	
1945	El destino se disculpa	Teófilo Dueñas	José Luis Sáenz de Heredia	
1945	The Road to Babel	Marcelino Pastor	Jerónimo Mihura	
1945	Espronceda	Mister Wilde	Fernando Alonso Casares	
1945	Bambú	Antonio	José Luis Sáenz de Heredia	
1945	Domingo de carnaval	Matías	Edgar Neville	
1945	Se le fue el novio	Miguel Novak	Julio Salvador	
1946	Es peligroso asomarse al exterior	Silvio	Alejandro Ulloa, Arthur Duarte	
1946	Eres un caso	Inocencio	Ramón Quadreny	
1946	Los habitantes de la casa deshabitada	Gregorio	Gonzalo Delgrás	
1947	Noche sin cielo	Emilio	Ignacio F. Iquino	
1948	Botón de ancla	Enrique Tejada y Sandoval	Ramón Torrado	
1948	Embrujo	Mentor	Carlos Serrano de Osma	
1948	La muralla feliz	Don Fulgencio Ríos	Enrique Herreros	
1948	The Black Siren	Gaspar de Montenegro	Carlos Serrano de Osma	
1948	La próxima vez que vivamos	Pablo	Enrique Gómez	
1948	Pototo, Boliche y compañía		Ramón Barreiro	
1948	Hoy no pasamos lista	Don Manuel	Raúl Alfonso, Rafael Alonso	
1948	Encrucijada		Pedro Lazaga	Short
1948	La mies es mucha	Padre Santiago Hernández	José Luis Sáenz de Heredia	
1949	Vida en sombras	Carlos	Lorenzo Llobet Gracia	
1949	Rosas de otoño	Adolfo Barona	Eduardo Morera and Juan de Orduña	
1949	Wings of Youth	Rodrigo	Antonio del Amo	
1950	Saturday Night	Carlos	Rafael Gil	
1950	Ninety Minutes	Sr. Marchand	Antonio del Amo	
1950	Tiempos felices		Enrique Gómez	
1950	El último caballo	Fernando	Edgar Neville	
1950	La noche del sábado	Director de orquesta (uncredited)	Rafael Gil	
1951	Balarrasa	Javier Mendoza 'Balarrasa'	José Antonio Nieves Conde	
1951	I Want to Marry You	Ramón	Jerónimo Mihura	
1951	La trinca del aire	Zanahoria	Ramón Torrado	
1951	Captain Poison	Jorge de Córdoba	Luis Marquina	
1952	The Pelegrín System	Héctor Pelegrín	Ignacio F. Iquino	
1952	Facultad de letras	Fernando	Pío Ballesteros	
1952	The Eyes Leave a Trace	Agente Díaz	José Luis Sáenz de Heredia	
1952	Cincuenta años del Real Madrid	Himself	Rafael Gil	
1953	La voce del silenzio	Fernando Layer - assistante spirituale	Georg Wilhelm Pabst	
1953	Esa pareja feliz	Juan Granados Muñoz	Juan Antonio Bardem, Luis García Berlanga	
1953	Airport	Luis	Luis Lucia Mingarro	
1953	Nadie lo sabrá	Pedro Gutiérrez	Ramón Torrado	
1953	Manicomio	Carlos	Fernando Fernán Gómez, Luis María Delgado	
1954	Rebellion	Federico Lanuza	José Antonio Nieves Conde	
1954	El mensaje			
1954	Morena Clara	Ramsés 45 / Don Lope de Baena y Carrasco / Don Enrique de Baena Rodríguez	Luis Lucia Mingarro	
1955	The Other Life of Captain Contreras	Alonso Contreras	Rafael Gil	
1955	El guardián del paraíso	Manuel	Arturo Ruiz Castillo	
1955	Congress in Seville	Dr. Guillermo Kroll	Antonio Román	
1955	Lo scapolo (El soltero)	Armando	Antonio Pietrangeli	
1956	La gran mentira	Fernando Fernán Gómez (uncredited)	Rafael Gil	
1956	El fenómeno	Claudio Henkel	José María Elorrieta	
1956	Viaje de novios	Juan Torregrosa Orózco	León Klimovsky	
1956	El malvado Carabel	Amaro Carabel		
1957	La ironía del dinero	Frasquito (segment "Sevilla")	Edgar Neville and Guy Lefranc	
1957	Un marido de ida y vuelta	Ramírez (uncredited)	Luis Lucia Mingarro	
1957	Faustina	Mogon	José Luis Sáenz de Heredia	
1957	Un marido de ida y vuelta	Pepe López Garcerán		
1957	Los ángeles del volante	Juanito	Ignacio F. Iquino	
1957	Las muchachas de azul	Juan Ferrandis	Pedro Lazaga	
1958	The Tenant	Evaristo González	José Antonio Nieves Conde	
1958	La vida por delante	Antonio Redondo	Fernando Fernán Gómez and José Luis de la Torre	
1958	Ana dice sí	Juan	Pedro Lazaga	
1959	Luna de verano	Juan	Pedro Lazaga	
1959	Soledad	Manuel	Mario Craveri	
1959	Bombas para la paz	Alfredo	Antonio Román	
1959	La vida alrededor	Antonio Redondo		
1960	Crimen para recién casados	Antonio Menéndez	Pedro Luis Ramírez	
1960	Les Trois etc. du Colonel (Los tres etc. del coronel)	Le guérillo Lorenzo	Claude Boissol	
1960	Sólo para hombres	Pablo Meléndez		
1961	Adiós, Mimí Pompón	Heriberto Promenade	Luis Marquina	
1961	La vida privada de Fulano de Tal		José María Forn	
1961	Fantasmas en la casa		Pedro Luis Ramírez	
1962	La venganza de Don Mendo	Don Mendo Salazar - Marqués de Cabra		
1962	¿Dónde pongo este muerto?	Manuel Carrasco	Pedro Luis Ramírez	
1963	La becerrada	Francisco Rodríguez 'Juncal'	José María Forqué	
1963	Rififi in the City	Sargento Detective Miguel Mora	Jesús Franco	
1963	Benigno, hermano mío		Arturo González hijo	
1965	El mundo sigue	Faustino		
1965	Un vampiro para dos	Baron de Rosenthal	Pedro Lazaga	
1966	Ninette y un señor de Murcia	Andrés Martínez Segura		
1966	La Mujer de tu prójimo		Enrique Carreras	
1966	Mayores con reparos	Fernando/ Miguel/ Manuel		
1968	La vil seducción	Ismael Bolante	José María Forqué	
1969	Carola de día, Carola de noche	Hombre del motocarro	Jaime de Armiñán	
1969	Un adulterio decente	Dr. Leopoldo Cumberri	Rafael Gil	
1969	Estudio amueblado 2.P.	Miguel Aguirrezabala	José María Forqué	
1969	Las panteras se comen a los ricos	José	Ramón Fernández	
1970	De profesión, sus labores	Federico	Javier Aguirre	
1970	¿Por qué pecamos a los cuarenta?	Dr. Alejandro Quesada	Pedro Lazaga	
1970	Crimen imperfecto	Salomón		
1970	Growing Leg, Diminishing Skirt	Amadeo - Duque de Daroca	Javier Aguirre	
1971	Cómo casarse en 7 días	Uncredited		
1971	Las Ibéricas F.C.	Federico	Pedro Masó	
1971	Los gallos de la madrugada	Afilador	José Luis Sáenz de Heredia	
1972	El triangulito	Lázaro López	José María Forqué	
1973	Don Quijote cabalga de nuevo	Don Quijote / Alonso Quixano	Roberto Gavaldón	
1973	La leyenda del alcalde de Zalamea	Don Lope	Mario Camus	
1973	Ana y los lobos	Fernando	Carlos Saura	
1973	The Spirit of the Beehive	Fernando	Víctor Erice	
1974	Vera, un cuento cruel	Roger	Josefina Molina	
1974	Yo la vi primero	Doctor		
1974	El amor del capitán Brando	Fernando	Jaime de Armiñán	
1975	Pim, pam, pum... ¡fuego!	Julio	Pedro Olea	
1975	Yo soy Fulana de Tal	Rodolfo Pellejo	Pedro Lazaga	
1975	Jó, papá	Julio	Jaime de Armiñán	
1975	Sensualidad	Carlos Baena	Germán Lorente	
1976	Imposible para una solterona	Manuel	Rafael Romero Marchent	
1976	La querida	Eduardo		
1976	El anacoreta	Fernando Tobajas	Juan Estelrich	
1977	Más fina que las gallinas	Don Enrique	Jesús Yagüe	
1977	Parranda	Escribiente	Gonzalo Suárez	
1977	Bruja, más que bruja	Tío Justino		
1977	Las cuatro novias de Augusto Pérez	Augusto Pérez	José Jara	
1977	Gulliver	Martín	Alfonso Ungría	
1977	Chely	Nicolás	Ramón Fernández	
1977	Reina Zanahoria	J. J	Gonzalo Suárez	
1977	The Pyjama Girl Case (La ragazza dal pigiama giallo)	Forensics detective	Flavio Mogherini	
1978	¡Arriba Hazaña!	Hermano Prefecto	José María Gutiérrez Santos	
1978	Los restos del naufragio		Ricardo Franco	
1979	Madrid al desnudo	Baltasar	Jacinto Molina	
1979	Milagro en el circo	Macario	Alejandro Galindo	
1979	Mamá cumple cien años	Fernando	Carlos Saura	
1980	Cuentos eróticos	Don Enrique (segment "Tiempos rotos") (voice)		
1980	Yo qué sé		Emma Cohen	Short
1981	Maravillas	Fernando	Manuel Gutiérrez Aragón	
1981	Apaga... y vámonos	Prof. Benjamín Rodero	Antonio Hernández	
1981	127 millones libres de impuestos	Félix	Pedro Masó	
1982	Copia cero	Carlos	Eduardo Campoy	
1982	Bésame, tonta	Director general	Fernando González de Canales	
1983	Interior roig (Interior rojo)		Eugenio Anglada	
1983	Soldados de plomo	Don Dimas	José Sacristán	
1983	Juana la loca... de vez en cuando	Sir Henry	José Ramón Larraz	
1984	Feroz	Luis	Manuel Gutiérrez Aragón	
1984	Los zancos	Ángel	Carlos Saura	
1984	La noche más hermosa	Luis	Manuel Gutiérrez Aragón	
1985	Stico	Don Leopoldo Contreras de Tejada	Jaime de Armiñán	
1985	De hombre a hombre	Silvestre	Ramón Fernández	
1985	Luces de bohemia	Ministro	Miguel Ángel Díez	
1985	Réquiem por un campesino español	Don Valeriano	Francisco Betriú	
1985	La corte de Faraón	Roque	José Luis García Sánchez	
1985	Marbella, un golpe de cinco estrellas	Germán	Miguel Hermoso	
1986	Pobre mariposa	Exiliado español	Raúl de la Torre	
1986	Mambrú se fue a la guerra	Emiliano		
1986	El viaje a ninguna parte	Don Arturo		
1986	La mitad del cielo	Don Pedro	Manuel Gutiérrez Aragón	
1986	Delirios de amor		Antonio González Vigil, Luis Eduardo Aute, Cristina Andreu and Félix Rotaeta	
1987	Cara de acelga	Madariaga	José Sacristán	
1987	Mi general	General Mario del Pozo	Jaime de Armiñán	
1987	Moros y cristianos	Don Fernando	Luis García Berlanga	
1987	El gran Serafín	Padre Bellot	José María Ulloque	
1989	Esquilache	Esquilache	Josefina Molina	
1989	El río que nos lleva	Don Ángel	Antonio del Real	
1989	El mar y el tiempo	Eusebio		
1991	Fuera de juego	Don Aníbal		
1991	El rey pasmado	Gran Inquisidor	Imanol Uribe	
1991	Marcellino (Marcelino, pan y vino)	Il priore	Luigi Comencini	
1992	Chechu y familia	Don José	Álvaro Sáenz de Heredia	
1992	Belle Époque	Manolo	Fernando Trueba	
1993	Cartas desde Huesca	Mainar	Antonio Artero	
1995	Así en el cielo como en la tierra	Dios Padre	José Luis Cuerda	
1996	El sueño de los héroes	Taboada	Sergio Renán	
1996	Tranvía a la Malvarrosa	Catedrático	José Luis García Sánchez	
1996	Pesadilla para un rico	Presidente		
1997	La hermana	Don Julián	Juan José Porto	
1997	Pintadas	José	Juan Estelrich Jr.	
1998	El abuelo	Don Rodrigo de Arista Potestad	José Luis Garci	
1999	Todo sobre mi madre	Padre de Rosa	Pedro Almodóvar	
1999	Pepe Guindo		Manuel Iborra	
1999	Plenilunio	Padre Orduña	Imanol Uribe	
1999	La lengua de las mariposas	Don Gregorio	José Luis Cuerda	
2000	Voz		Javier Aguirre	
2001	Visionarios	Gobernador	Manuel Gutiérrez Aragón	
2002	En la ciudad sin límites	Max	Antonio Hernández	
2002	El embrujo de Shanghai	Capitán Blay	Fernando Trueba	
2003	Variaciones 1/113	Voice		
2003	Bibliofrenia	Professor Arturo Fuentes	Marcos Moreno	
2004	Tiovivo c. 1950	Tertuliano	José Luis Garci	
2004	¡Hay motivo!	Self (segment: Epílogo) (voice)	Various	
2005	Para que no me olvides	Mateo	Patricia Ferreira	
2005	Pablo G. del Amo, un montador de ilusiones	Himself	Diego Galán	
2006	Medea 2	Mensajero		
2006	Mia Sarah	Paul	Gustavo Ron	Final film role

=== Television ===
==== Writer and Director ====
Year	Title	Director	Writer	Notes
1973	Juan soldado	Yes	No	TV movie
1974-1975	El pícaro	Yes	Yes	TV Miniseries; 13 episodes
1992	Cuentos de Burgos	No	Yes	Episode "La Intrusa"
1994	La Mujer de tu Vida 2	Yes	Yes	Episode "Las Mujeres de mi Vida"

==== Acting roles ====
Year	Title	Role	Notes
1968	Fábulas	Various	Series
1968	El alcalde de Zalamea		Episodio de "Estudio 1"
1969	La última cinta		Episodio de "Hora once"
1971	Del dicho al hecho		Series
1973	Juan soldado		
1974	El pícaro		Mini-series
1978	Memorias del cine español		Episodio
1980	Fortunata y Jacinta		Mini-series
1981	El alcalde de Zalamea		Episodio de "Teatro estudio"
1982	Ramón y Cajal		Series
1983	Los desastres de la guerra		Mini-series
1983	Las pícaras		Episodio
1983	El jardín de Venus		Series
1984	Nuevo amanecer		Episodio de "Cuentos imposibles"
1985-1986	La noche del cine español		Dos episodios
1987	Juncal		Mini-series
1988	La mujer de tu vida: La mujer perdida		
1992	La mujer de tu vida 2: Las mujeres de mi vida		
1992	Esta noche es Nochebuena		Episodio de "Farmacia de guardia"
1993	Los ladrones van a la oficina		Series
1993-1995	Los ladrones van a la oficina		
2001	Cuéntame cómo pasó		

== Theater ==
=== Playwright ===
- Pareja para la eternidad (1947)
- Marido y medio (1950)
- Las bicicletas son para el verano (1977)
- Los domingos, bacanal (1980)
- Del Rey Ordás y su infamia (1983)
- La coartada (1985)
- Ojos de bosque (1986)
- El Pícaro. Aventuras y desventuras de Lucas Maraña (1992)
- Lazarillo de Tormes (Adaptation) (1994)
- Los invasores del palacio (2000)
- Defensa de Sancho Panza (2002)
- Morir cuerdo y vivir loco (2004)

=== Director ===
- La vida en un bloc (1953)
- Con derecho a fantasma (1958)
- Gravemente peligrosa (1962)
- Dear Liar (1962)
- The Kreutzer Sonata (1963)
- Thought (1963)
- Mayores con reparos (1965)
- La vil seducción (1967)
- El alcalde de Zalamea (1979)

=== Actor ===
- Los ladrones somos gente honrada (1941)
- El amor sólo dura 2.000 metros (1941)
- Madre (el drama padre) (1941)
- Es peligroso asomarse al exterior (1942)
- El caso del señor vestido de violeta (1954)
- Mayores con reparos (1965)
- La vil seducción (1967)
- La pereza (1968)
- Un enemigo del pueblo (1972)
- El alcalde de Zalamea (1979)

== Bibliography ==
=== Novels ===
- El vendedor de naranjas (1961)
- El viaje a ninguna parte (1985)
- El mar y el tiempo (1988)
- El ascensor de los borrachos (1993)
- La Puerta del Sol (1995)
- ¡Stop! novela de amor (1997)
- El tiempo de los trenes (2004)

=== Historical novels ===
- El mal amor (1987)
- La cruz y el lirio dorado (1998)
- Oro y hambre (1999)
- Capa y espada (2001)

=== Memoirs ===
- Diario de Cinecittà (1952) (Published by International Film Magazine, No. 6, November 1952 and No. 7, December 1952)
- El olvido y la memoria. Autobiografía de Fernando Fernán-Gómez (1981) (Published in Triunfo, No. 3, 6th period, January 1981)
- El tiempo amarillo. Memorias. I (1921-1943) (1990)
- El tiempo amarillo. Memorias. II (1943-1987) (1990)
- El tiempo amarillo: memorias ampliadas (1921-1997) (1998)

=== Articles and essays ===
- El actor y los demás (1987)
- Impresiones y depresiones (1987)
- Historias de la picaresca (1989)
- Las anécdotas del teatro: ¡aquí sale hasta el apuntador! (1991)
- El arte de desear (1992)
- Imagen de Madrid (1992)
- Tejados de Madrid (1992)
- Desde la última fila: cien años de cine (1995)
- Nosotros, los mayores (1999)
- Puro teatro y algo más (2002)

=== Poetry ===
- A Roma por algo (1954) (First published in the poetry collection "Poesía Española" (1954) and then separately in 1982)
- El canto es vuelo (2002) (Complete poetry collection)

=== Children's Literature ===
- Los ladrones (1986)
- Retal (1988)

=== Published plays ===
- Pareja para la eternidad (1947)
- Las bicicletas son para el verano (1977)
- La coartada (1985) (published with "Los domingos, bacanal")
- Los domingos, bacanal (1985) (published with "La coartada")
- Lazarilo de Tormes (Adaptation) (1994)
- Defensa de Sancho Panza (2002) (Published on the magazine "Acotaciones 20")

=== Published screenplyas ===
- Mi querido general (1986)
- La Intrusa (1991) (Teleplay for the anthology TV series "Cuentos de Burgos")
- Fuera de juego (1991)

=== Collections ===
- La coartada/Los domingos, bacanal (1985) (two plays published together in one book)
- La escena, la calle y las nubes (2000) (short stories collection)
- Variedades (2019) (articles recompilation published postmothusly)
- Teatro (2019) (plays recopilation published postmothusly)

=== Interviews ===
- La buena memoria (1997) (Conversation by Fernando Fernán-Gómez & Eduardo Haro Tecglen transcribed by Diego Galán)
- Conversaciones con Fernando Fernán-Gómez (2002) (Interview with Fernando Fernán-Gómez by Enrique Brasó)

== Accolades ==
=== National Theater Award ===
Year	Result
1985	Won

=== National Cinematography Award ===
Year	Result
1989	Won

=== Goya Awards ===
Year	Award	Film	Result
1987	Best Actor	Mambru Went to War	Won
1987	Best Director	Voyage to Nowhere	Won
1987	Best Screenplay	Voyage to Nowhere	Won
1993	Best Supporting Actor	Belle Époque	Won
1999	Best Actor	The Grandfather	Won
2001	Best Adapted Screenplay	Lázaro de Tormes	Won

=== Fotogramas de Plata ===
Year	Award	Film	Result
1952	Best Spanish Movie Performer	Reckless	Won
1970	Best TV Performer	La última cinta	Won
1974	Best TV Performer	Juan soldado	Won
1987	Best Movie Actor	Delirios de amor Mambru Went to War; Half of Heaven; Voyage to Nowhere	Won
1998	Lifetime Achievement Award	—N/a	Awarded

=== CEC Awards ===
Year	Award	Film	Result
1951	Best Actor	The Last Horse	Won
1952	Best Actor	Reckless	Won
1959	Best Original Story	La vida por delante	Won
1974	Best Actor	The Spirit of the Beehive; Ana and the Wolves	Won
1979	Best Actor	The Remains from the Shipwreck	Won
1992	Best Original Screenplay	Fuera de juego	Won
1999	Best Actor	The Grandfather	Won
2007	Best Supporting Actor	Mia Sarah	Won

=== Sant Jordi Awards ===
Year	Award	Film	Result
1985	Best Spanish Actor	Feroz; La noche más hermosa Los zancos	Won
1987	Best Film	Voyage to Nowhere	Won
1990	Best Spanish Film	The Sea and Time	Won

=== TP de Oro ===
Year	Award	Film	Result
1975	Best National Actor	El pícaro	Won

=== New York Latin ACE Awards ===
Year	Award	Film	Result
2000	Best Supporting Actor	All About My Mother	Won

=== Actors and Actresses Union Awards ===
Year	Award	Film	Result
1992	Lifetime Achievement Award	—N/a	Awarded

=== Berlin International Film Festival ===
Year	Award	Film	Result
1977	Silver Bear for Best Actor	The Anchorite	Won
1985	Silver Bear for Best Actor	Stico	Won
2005	Honorary Golden Bear	—N/a	Awarded

=== Venice Film Festival ===
Year	Award	Film	Result
1984	Pasinetti Prize for Best Actor	The Stilts	Won

=== San Sebastián International Film Festival ===
Year	Award	Film	Result
1989	Special Jury Prize	The Sea and Time	Won
1999	Donostia Lifetime Achievement Award	—N/a	Awarded

=== Mar del Plata International Film Festival ===
Year	Award	Film	Result
1959	Best Film	La vida por delante	Nominated

=== Gramado Film Festival ===
Year	Award	Film	Result
1993	Golden Kikito for Best Supporting Actor	Belle Époque	Won

=== Biarritz International Festival of Audiovisual Programming ===
Year	Award	Film	Result
1999	Honorary Euro-FIPA	—N/a	Awarded

=== International Television Festival Golden Prague ===
Year	Award	Film	Result
1973	Grand Prix for Best Director	Juan soldado	Won

== Honours ==
- Gold Medal of Merit in the Fine Arts (1981)
- Prince of Asturias Award for the Arts (1995)
- Gold Medal of the Academy of Cinematographic Arts and Sciences of Spain (2001)
- Gold Medal of Merit in Labour (2001)
- Grand Cross of the Civil Order of Alfonso X, the Wise (2007)

== See also ==
- Cinema of Spain
- Café Gijón (Madrid)
