= Pablo González del Amo =

Pablo González del Amo (1927–2004), also commonly credited as Pablo G. del Amo, was a Spanish film editor.

Pablo González del Amo was born in 1927 in Madrid. Affiliated to the Communist Party of Spain at age 17, he spent five years imprisoned by the Francoist regime. While in prison, he acquainted with Ricardo Muñoz Suay, who introduced him to the film technical craft. He lived and worked in exile in Portugal for four years.

From 1963 to 1984, he worked as editor in the films produced by Elías Querejeta. He was awarded the National Film Prize in 1983. A founding member of the Academy of Cinematographic Arts and Sciences of Spain, he won three Goya Awards, respectively for Divine Words, Tirano Banderas, and ¡Ay Carmela!.

He died on 4 August 2004 in Madrid at the age of 77.

A documentary directed by Diego Galán about his work entitled Pablo G. del Amo, un montador de ilusiones was released in 2005.
