= List of Spanish films of 1986 =

A list of Spanish-produced and co-produced feature films released in Spain in 1986.

== Films ==
Release		Title (Domestic title)	Cast & Crew	Ref.
J A N U A R Y	17	Lola	Director: Bigas Luna Cast: Ángela Molina, Patrick Bauchau, Féodor Atkine, Assumpta Serna	
F E B R U A R Y	27	El río de oro	Director: Jaime Chávarri Cast: Ángela Molina, Bruno Ganz, Francesca Annis, Stefan Gubser, Juan Diego Botto, Nacho Rodríguez, Carolyn Norris	
M A R C H	7	Matador	Director: Pedro Almodóvar Cast: Assumpta Serna, Antonio Banderas, Nacho Martínez, Eva Cobo, Julieta Serrano, Chus Lampreave, Carmen Maura, Eusebio Poncela, Bibi Andersen	
M A R C H	13	Tiempo de silencio	Director: Vicente Aranda Cast: Imanol Arias, Victoria Abril, Francisco Rabal, Charo López, Francisco Algora, Joaquín Hinojosa, Juan Echanove	
M A R C H	23	El amor brujo	Director: Carlos Saura Cast: Antonio Gades, Cristina Hoyos, Laura del Sol, Juan Antonio Jiménez, Emma Penella	
A P R I L	9	Hostages in the Barrio (La estanquera de Vallecas)	Director: Eloy de la Iglesia Cast: Emma Penella, José Luis Gómez, José Luis Manzano, Maribel Verdú	
A P R I L	29	Romanza final (Gayarre)	Director: José María Forqué Cast: José Carreras, Sydne Rome, Antonio Ferrandis, Mario Pardo, Susana Campos, Montserrat Caballé	
J U L Y	10	Dragon Rapide	Director: Jaime Camino Cast: Juan Diego, Victoria Peña, Manuel de Blas, Pedro Díaz del Corral, Laura García Lorca, Miguel Molina	
A U G U S T	18	Puzzle	Director: Luis José Comerón Cast: Patxi Andión, Carmen Elías, Héctor Alterio, Antonio Banderas	
S E P T E M B E R	19	Werther	Director: Pilar Miró Cast: Eusebio Poncela, Mercedes Sampietro, Féodor Atkine	
S E P T E M B E R	23	27 Hours (27 horas)	Director: Montxo Armendáriz Cast: Martxelo Rubio, Maribel Verdú, Jon Donosti, Antonio Banderas	
O C T O B E R	3	The House Must Be Unmade (Hay que deshacer la casa)	Director: José Luis García Sánchez Cast: Amparo Rivelles, Amparo Soler Leal, Joaquín Kremel, José María Pou, Luis Merlo, Guillermo Montesinos, Francisco Valladares, Luis Ciges, Antonio Gamero, Félix Rotaeta, Agustín Gonzalez, José Luis López Vázquez	
O C T O B E R	9	Half of Heaven (La mitad del cielo)	Director: Manuel Gutiérrez Aragón Cast: Ángela Molina, Margarita Lozano, Antonio Valero, Nacho Martínez, Santiago Ramos, Carolina Silva, Fernando Fernán Gómez	
O C T O B E R	15	Voyage to Nowhere (El viaje a ninguna parte)	Director: Fernando Fernán-Gómez Cast: José Sacristán, Laura del Sol, Juan Diego, María Luisa Ponte, Gabino Diego, Nuria Gallardo, Fernando Fernán-Gómez	
N O V E M B E R	3	The Disputed Vote of Mr. Cayo (El disputado voto del Sr. Cayo)	Director: Antonio Giménez-Rico Cast: Francisco Rabal, Juan Luis Galiardo, Iñaki Miramón, Lydia Bosch	
D E C E M B E R	5	Year of Enlightment (El año de las luces)	Director: Fernando Trueba Cast: Jorge Sanz, Maribel Verdú, Manuel Alexandre, Rafaela Aparicio, José Sazatornil, Lucas Martín, Santiago Ramos, Chus Lampreave, Violeta Cela, Verónica Forqué	
D E C E M B E R	18	Dear Nanny (Tata mía)	Director: José Luis Borau Cast: Imperio Argentina, Carmen Maura, Alfredo Landa, Miguel Rellán, Marisa Paredes, Julieta Serrano, Enriqueta Carballeira, Emma Suárez	

== See also ==
- 1st Goya Awards
