= Retrato de familia =

Retrato de familia may refer to:

- Retrato de Familia (film), a 1976 Spanish film
- Retrato de familia (TV series), a 1995 Mexican telenovela
