= The Bastard Brother of God =

1986 Spanish drama film

- Theatrical release poster
- Spanish: El hermano bastardo de Dios
- Directed by: Benito Rabal
- Written by: Agustín Cerezales Laforet; Benito Rabal
- Based on: El hermano bastardo de Dios (novel) by José Luis Coll
- Produced by: Jesús Palacios
- Starring: Francisco Rabal; Asunción Balaguer; Agustín González; María Luisa Ponte; Mario Pardo; Terele Pávez; Lucas Martín; Paco Rabal Cerezales; José Luis Coll; Juan Diego
- Cinematography: Paco Femenía
- Edited by: José María Biurrún
- Music by: Juan Pablo Muñoz Zielinski
- Production company: Almadraba Producciones
- Distributed by: InCine
- Release date: 22 September 1986 (Madrid)
- Running time: 102 min
- Country: Spain
- Language: Spanish

The Bastard Brother of God (Spanish: El hermano bastardo de Dios) is a 1986 drama film directed by Benito Rabal and starring Francisco Rabal, Asunción Balaguer and Agustín González. Based on the autobiographical novel by José Luis Coll, the plot is set in Cuenca, tackling the Spanish Civil War and Franco's rule.

== Cast ==
- Francisco Rabal as Rosendo
- Asunción Balaguer as Doña Trini
- Agustín González as Don Enrique
- María Luisa Ponte as Alejandra
- Mario Pardo as Tío Julio
- Terele Pávez as Ramona
- Juan Diego as Omar Hazim
- José Vivó
- Rafael Álvarez 'El Brujo' as Tonto
- Marina Martínez Andina
- Nieves Romero
- Luisa Rodrigo
- Antonio Gamero as Tendero
- Raúl Freire as Rojo
- Concha Hidalgo
- Concha Leza
- Julia Lorente
- Adela Armengol
- Miguel Ángel Rellán as Miliciano
- Manolo Zarzo as Doctor
- Lucas Martín as Pepe Luis menor
- Liberto Rabal as Pepe Luis mayor
- José Luis Coll as Pepe Luis adulto

== Accolades ==
Year	Award	Category	Nominee(s)	Result	Ref.
1987	1st Goya Awards	Best Supporting Actress	María Luisa Ponte	Nominated	
1987	1st Goya Awards	Best Sound	Carlos Faruolo, Alfonso Pino	Nominated	

== See also ==
- List of Spanish films of 1986
