= Goya Award for Best Actress =

Annual award by the Spanish Film Academy

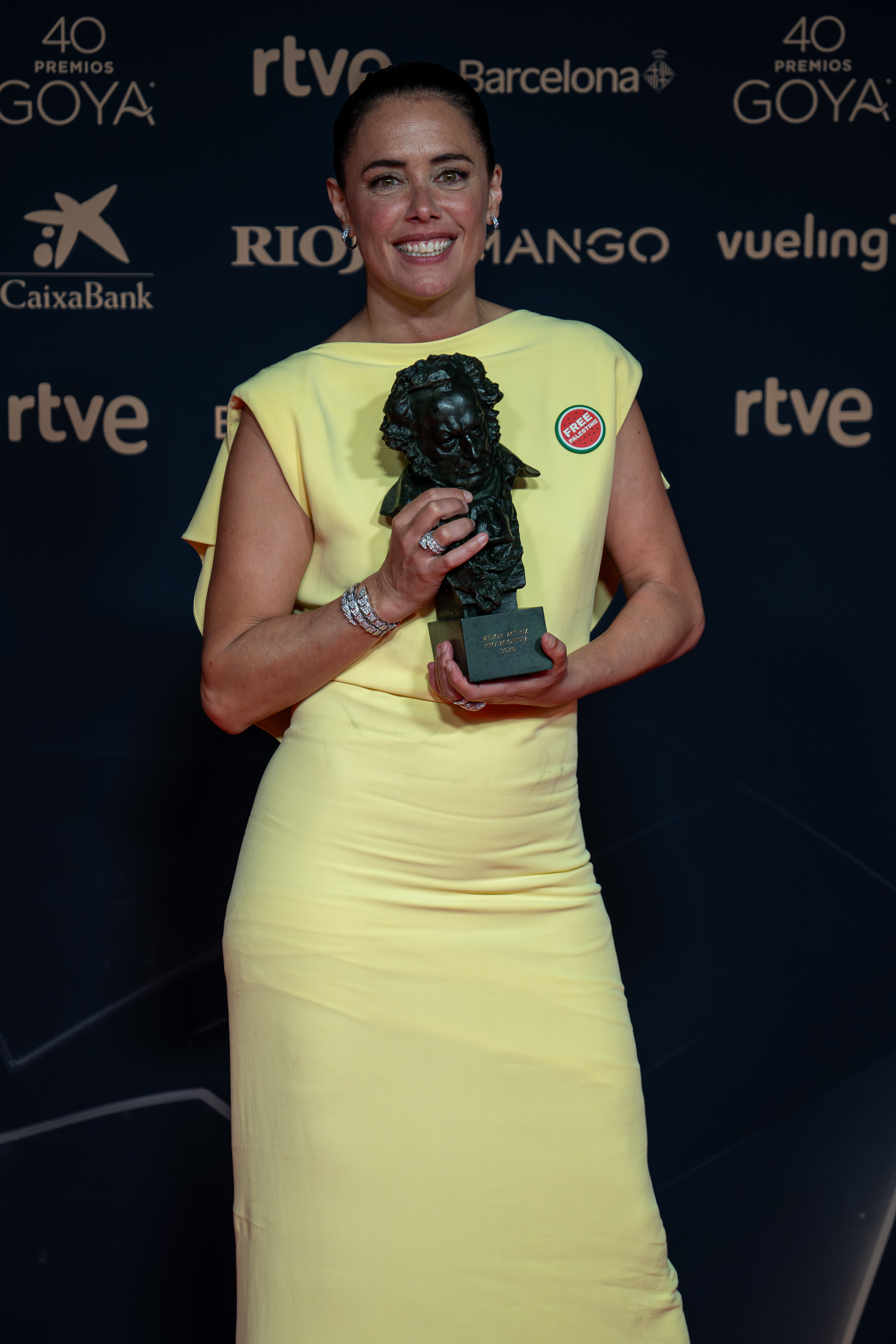
- The 2026 recipient: Patricia López Arnaiz
- Native name: Premio Goya a la mejor interpretación femenina protagonista
- Awarded for: Best performance by an actress in a leading role in a Spanish film of the year
- Country: Spain
- Presented by: Academy of Cinematographic Arts and Sciences of Spain (AACCE)
- First award: 1st Goya Awards (1986)
- Most recent winner: Patricia López Arnaiz; Sundays (2025)
- Website: Official website

The Goya Award for Best Actress (Spanish: Premio Goya a la mejor interpretación femenina protagonista) is one of the Goya Awards presented annually by the Academy of Cinematographic Arts and Sciences of Spain (AACCE) since the awards debuted in 1986. It is given in honor of an actress who has delivered an outstanding leading performance in a Spanish film.

== History ==
Since its inception, the award has been given to 26 actresses. At the 1st Goya Awards ceremony held in 1986, Amparo Rivelles was the first winner of this award for her role as Laura in We Must Undo the House.

Carmen Maura has received the most awards in this category with three wins. Other multiple winners are Cecilia Roth, Lola Dueñas, Verónica Forqué, Emma Suárez, Maribel Verdú, and Penélope Cruz, with two wins each. Cruz is the most nominated actress for the award being nominated on twelve occasions. Victoria Abril and Verdú follow in terms of nominations with eight each.

Actresses that won or were nominated for this category have had a significant presence in several film festivals both Spanish and international: Angela Molina (Half of Heaven), Victoria Abril (El Lute: Run for Your Life and Nobody Will Speak of Us When We're Dead), Carmen Maura (Common Wealth), Pilar López de Ayala (Mad Love), Mercedes Sampietro (Common Ground), Laia Marull (Take My Eyes), Blanca Portillo (Seven Billiard Tables), Lola Dueñas (Me Too), Marian Álvarez (Wounded), all have received the Silver Shell for Best Actress at the San Sebastián International Film Festival. Silvia Abascal (The Idiot Maiden), Aura Garrido (Stockholm), Elena Anaya (They Are All Dead), Natalia de Molina (Food and Shelter), Nathalie Poza (Can't Say Goodbye), Kiti Manver (One Careful Owner), Laia Costa (Lullaby), and María Vázquez (Matria), all received the Best Actress award at the Málaga Film Festival. Penélope Cruz received the Volpi Cup for Best Actress at the Venice Film Festival for Parallel Mothers and the Best Actress award at the Cannes Film Festival for Volver (shared with the female cast).

At the 94th Academy Awards, Cruz was nominated for Best Actress for Parallel Mothers (2021).

As of the 2026 ceremony, Patricia López Arnaiz is the most recent winner in this category for her role as Maite in Sundays.

== Winners and nominees ==
In the following table, the years are listed as per the Spanish Film Academy convention, corresponding to year the ceremony was held.

Table key
‡	Indicates the winner

=== 1980s ===
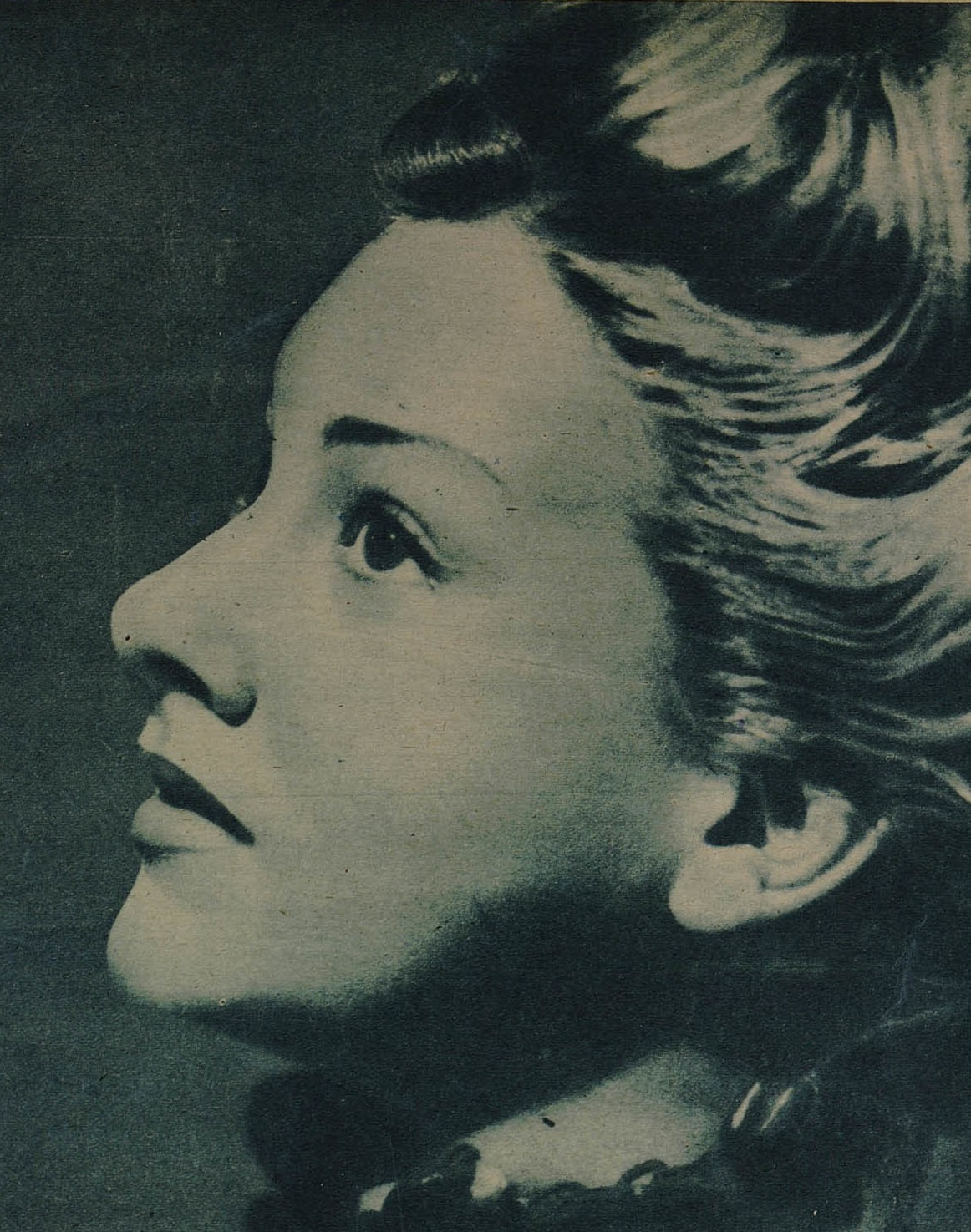
Amparo Rivelles was the first winner in this category for her performance in We Must Undo the House (1986).

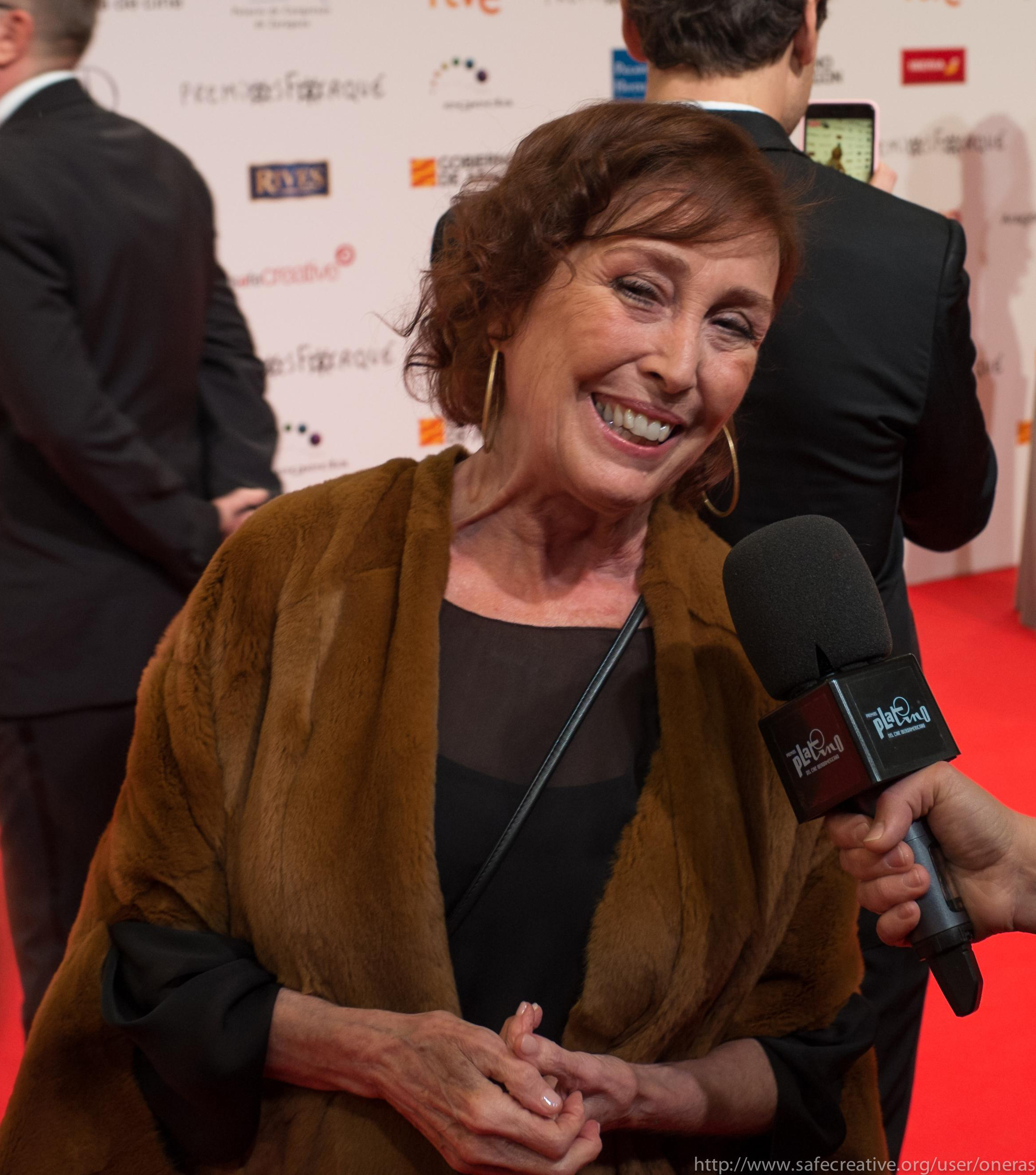
Verónica Forqué has won twice, The Happy Life in 1987 and Kika in 1993.

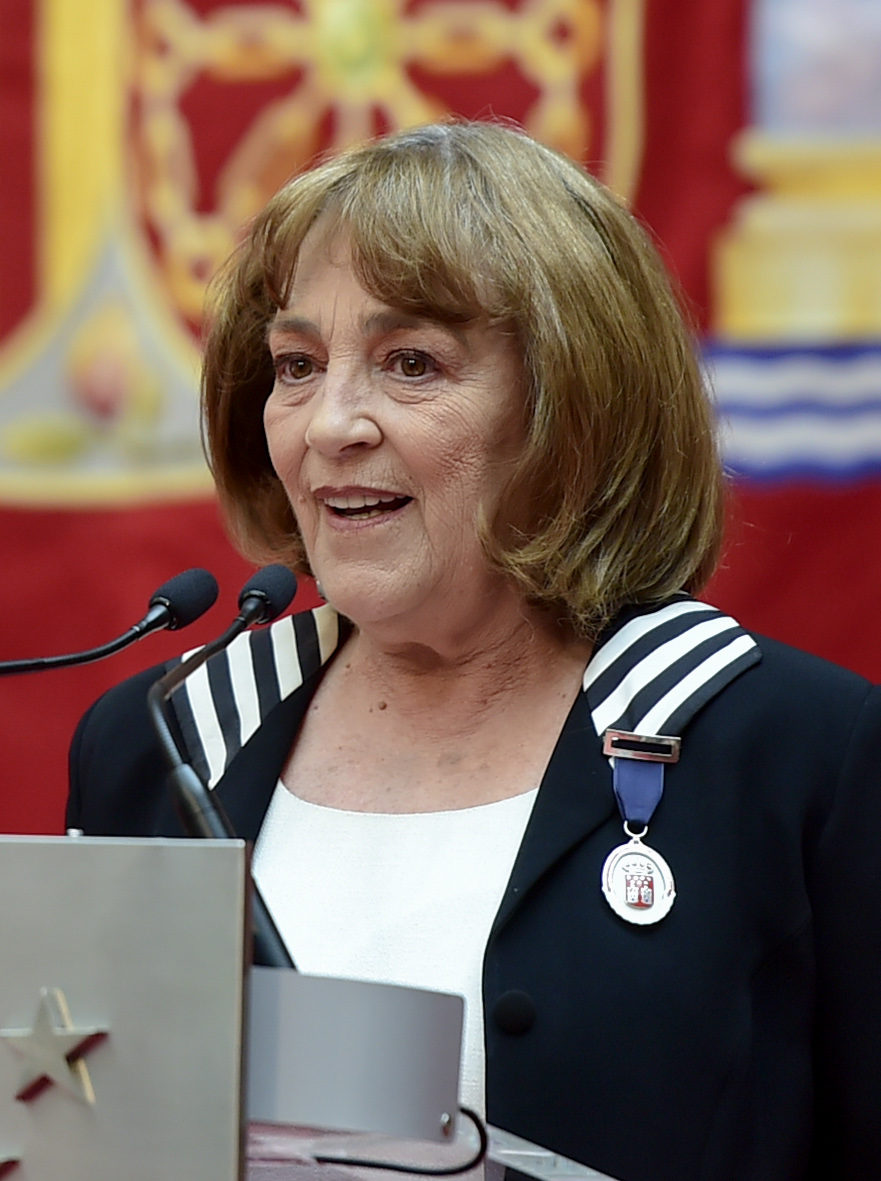
Carmen Maura won the most best actress awards, three, for Women on the Verge of a Nervous Breakdown (1988), Ay, Carmela! (1990) and Common Wealth (2000)

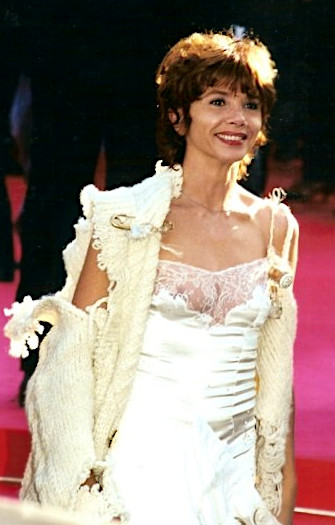
Victoria Abril was nominated eight times and won once for her role in Nobody Will Speak of Us When We're Dead (1994)

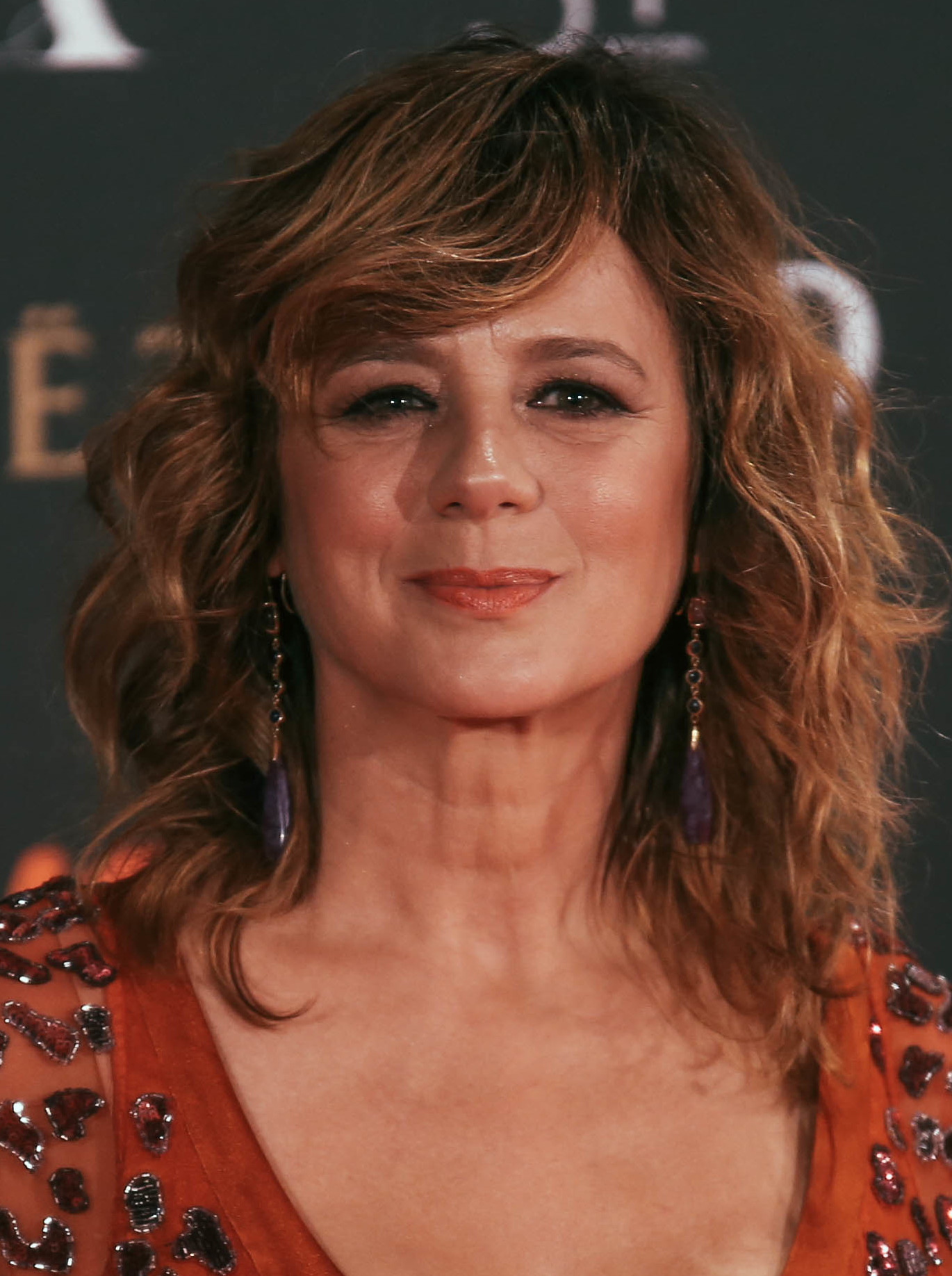
Emma Suárez has won best actress twice, for The Dog in the Manger in 1996 and Julieta in 2018.

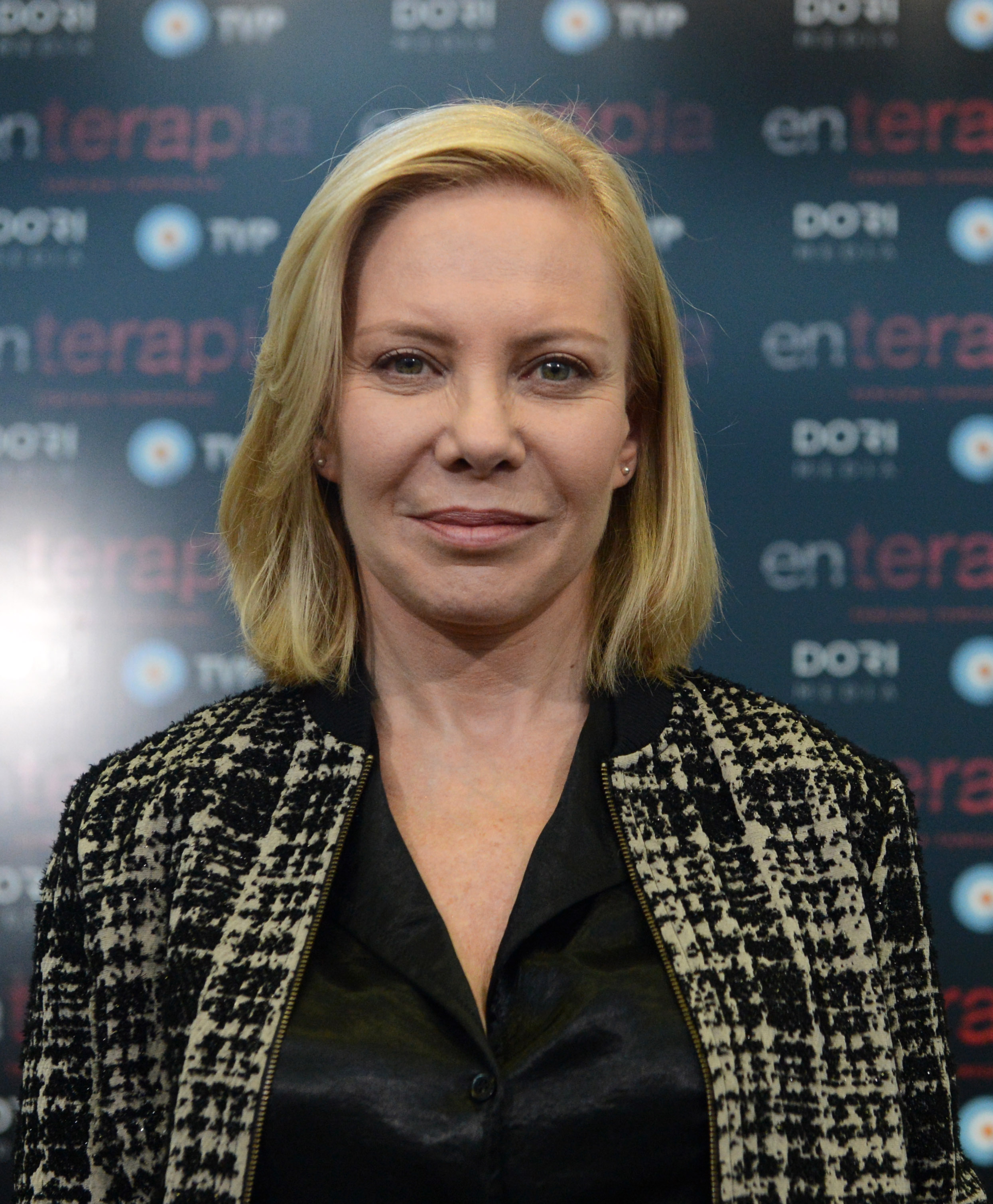
Cecilia Roth has won twice, for Martín (Hache) in 1997 and All About My Mother in 1999.

Year	Actress	Role(s)	English title	Original title
1986 (1st)	Amparo Rivelles ‡	Laura García	We Must Undo the House	Hay que deshacer la casa
1986 (1st)	Victoria Abril	Dorita	Time of Silence	Tiempo de silencio
1986 (1st)	Ángela Molina	Rosa	Half of Heaven	La mitad del cielo
1987 (2nd)	Verónica Forqué ‡	Ana Chamorro	The Happy Life	La vida alegre
1987 (2nd)	Victoria Abril	Consuelo "Chelo" García	El Lute: Run for Your Life	El lute: camina o revienta
1987 (2nd)	Irene Gutiérrez Caba	Bernarda Alba	The House of Bernarda Alba	La casa de Bernada Alba
1988 (3rd)	Carmen Maura ‡	Pepa Marcos	Women on the Verge of a Nervous Breakdown	Mujeres al borde de un ataque de nervios
1988 (3rd)	Victoria Abril	Ana Alonso	Baton Rouge	
1988 (3rd)	Ana Belén	Alejandra Barrachina	Miss Caribe	
1988 (3rd)	María Fernanda D'Ocón	Sor Mercedes	Caminos de tiza	
1988 (3rd)	Ángela Molina	Charo	Lights and Shadows	Luces y sombras
1989 (4th)	Rafaela Aparicio ‡	Grandmother	The Sea and the Weather	El mar y el tiempo
1989 (4th)	Victoria Abril	Ramona / Menchu / Aurora Nin	If They Tell You I Fell	Si te dicen que caí
1989 (4th)	Ana Belén	Paloma	The Flight of the Dove	El vuelo de la paloma
1989 (4th)	Verónica Forqué	Chusa	Going South Shopping	Bajarse al moro
1989 (4th)	Ángela Molina	Pepita Morán	The Things of Love	Las cosas del querer

=== 1990s ===
Year	Actress	Role(s)	English title	Original title
1990 (5th)	Carmen Maura ‡	Carmela	Ay, Carmela!	¡Ay, Carmela!
1990 (5th)	Victoria Abril	Marina Osorio	Tie Me Up! Tie Me Down!	¡Átame!
1990 (5th)	Charo López	Clara	The Most Natural Thing	Lo más natural
1991 (6th)	Sílvia Munt ‡	Carmen Galán	Butterfly Wings	Alas de mariposa
1991 (6th)	Victoria Abril	Luisa	Lovers	Amantes
1991 (6th)	Maribel Verdú	Trini	Lovers	Amantes
1992 (7th)	Ariadna Gil ‡	Violeta	Belle Époque	
1992 (7th)	Penélope Cruz	Silvia	Jamón Jamón	
1992 (7th)	Assumpta Serna	Adela de Otero	The Fencing Master	El maestro de esgrima
1993 (8th)	Verónica Forqué ‡	Kika	Kika	
1993 (8th)	Carmen Maura	Ana	Shadows in a Conflict	Sombras en una batalla
1993 (8th)	Emma Suárez	Lisa / Sofía	The Red Squirrel	La ardilla roja
1994 (9th)	Cristina Marcos ‡	Yoli	All Men Are the Same	Todos los hombres sois iguales
1994 (9th)	Ana Belén	Desideria Oliván	The Turkish Passion	La pasión turca
1994 (9th)	Ruth Gabriel	Charo	Running Out of Time	Días contados
1995 (10th)	Victoria Abril ‡	Gloria Duque	Nobody Will Speak of Us When We're Dead	Nadie hablará de nosotras cuando hayamos muerto
1995 (10th)	Ariadna Gil	María	Antarctica	Antártida
1995 (10th)	Marisa Paredes	Leo Macías	The Flower of My Secret	La flor de mi secreto
1996 (11th)	Emma Suárez ‡	Diana	The Dog in the Manger	El perro del hortelano
1996 (11th)	Ana Torrent	Ángela Márquez	Thesis	Tesis
1996 (11th)	Concha Velasco	Palmira Gadea	Beyond the Garden	Más allá del jardín
1997 (12th)	Cecilia Roth ‡	Alicia	Martín (Hache)	
1997 (12th)	Maribel Verdú	Marina	The Lucky Star	La buena estrella
1997 (12th)	Julia Gutiérrez Caba	Lola	The Color of the Clouds	El color de las nubes
1998 (13th)	Penélope Cruz ‡	Macarena Granada	The Girl of Your Dreams	La niña de tus ojos
1998 (13th)	Cayetana Guillén Cuervo	Lucrecia Richmond	The Grandfather	El abuelo
1998 (13th)	Najwa Nimri	Ana	Lovers of the Arctic Circle	Los amantes del círculo polar
1998 (13th)	Leonor Watling	Carmen López	A Time for Defiance	La hora de los valientes
1999 (14th)	Cecilia Roth ‡	Manuela Coleman	All About My Mother	Todo sobre mi madre
1999 (14th)	Ariadna Gil	Isabel	Black Tears	Lágrimas negras
1999 (14th)	Carmen Maura	Berta	Lisbon	Lisboa
1999 (14th)	Mercedes Sampietro	Gloria	By My Side Again	Cuando vuelvas a mi lado

=== 2000s ===
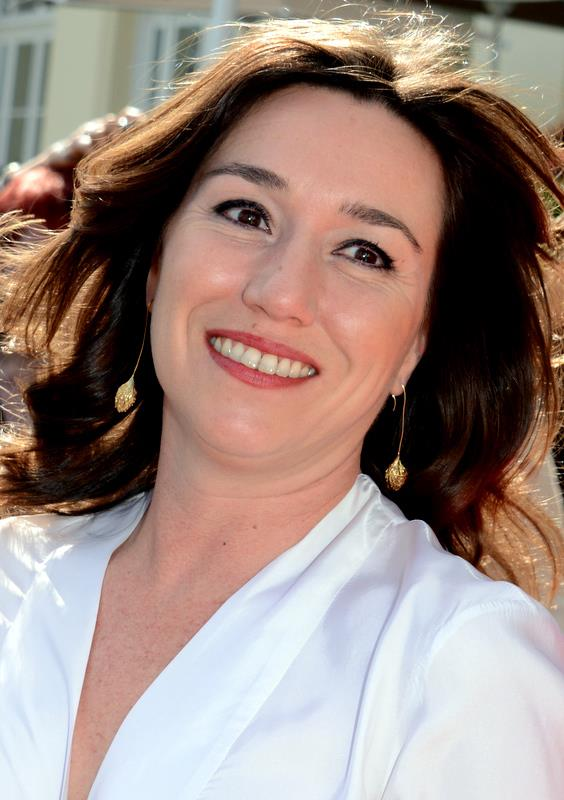
Lola Dueñas won twice, for The Sea Inside (2004) and Me Too (2009)

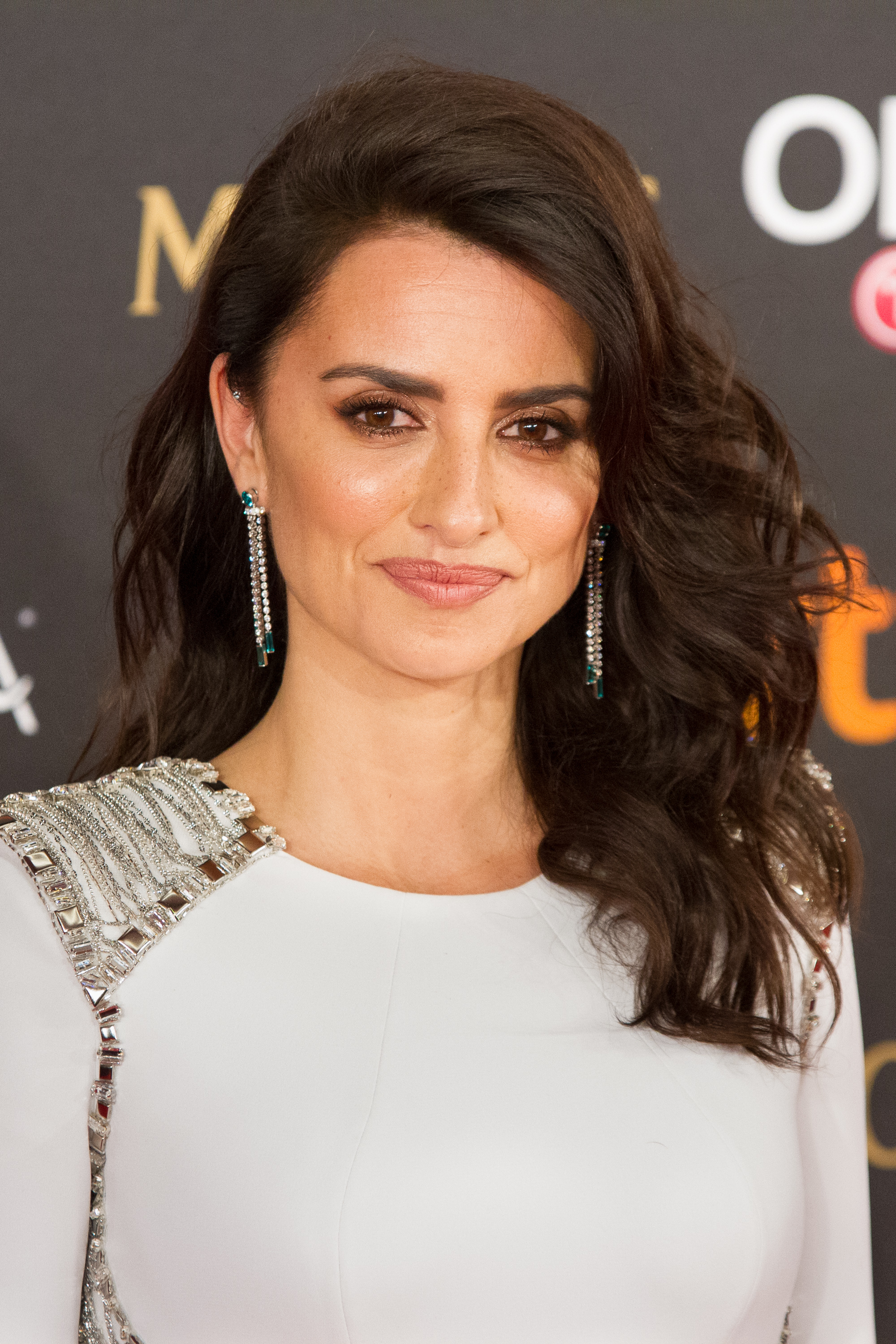
Penélope Cruz was nominated twelve times and won twice for The Girl of Your Dreams (1998) and Volver (2006)

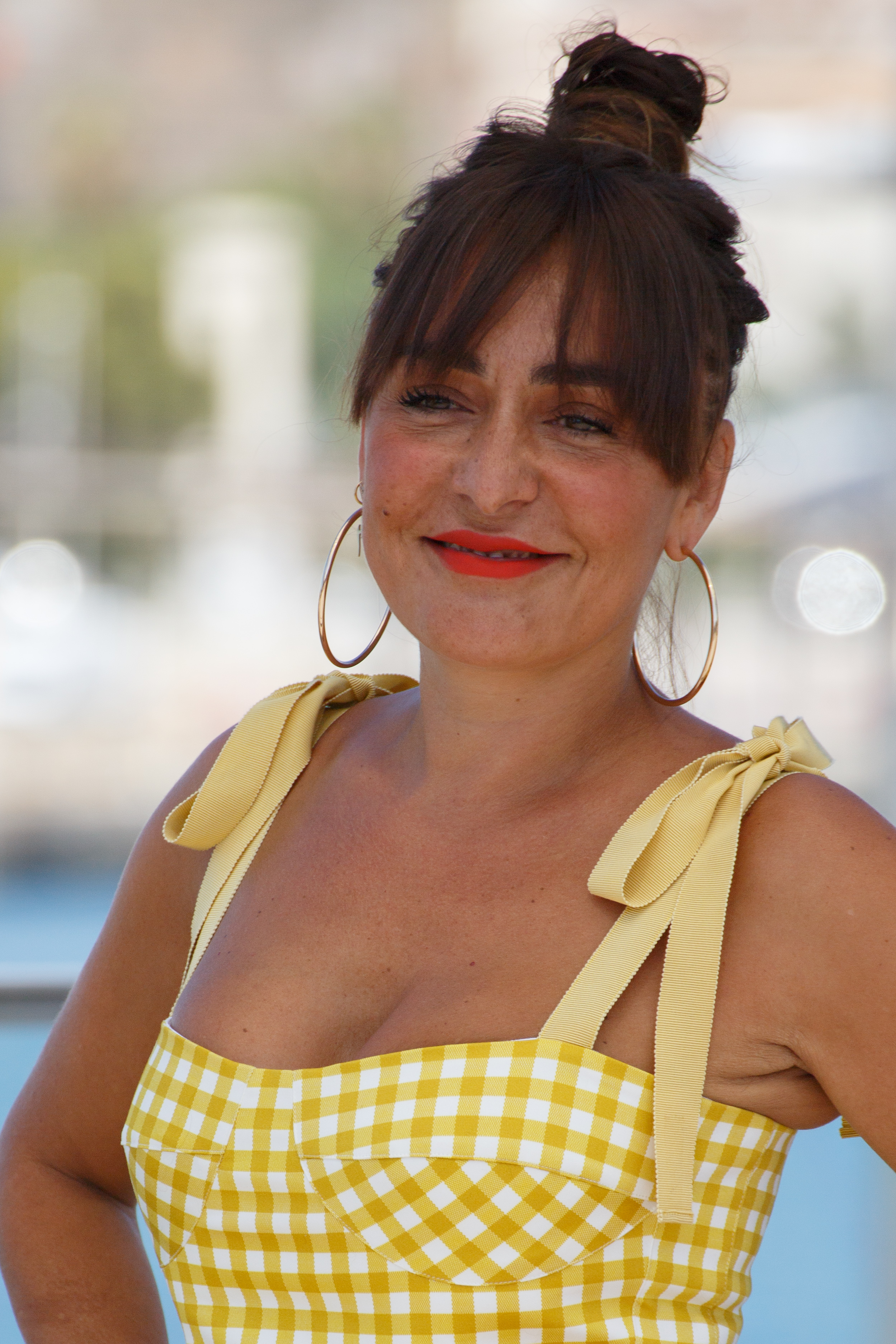
Candela Peña won for Princesas in 2005.

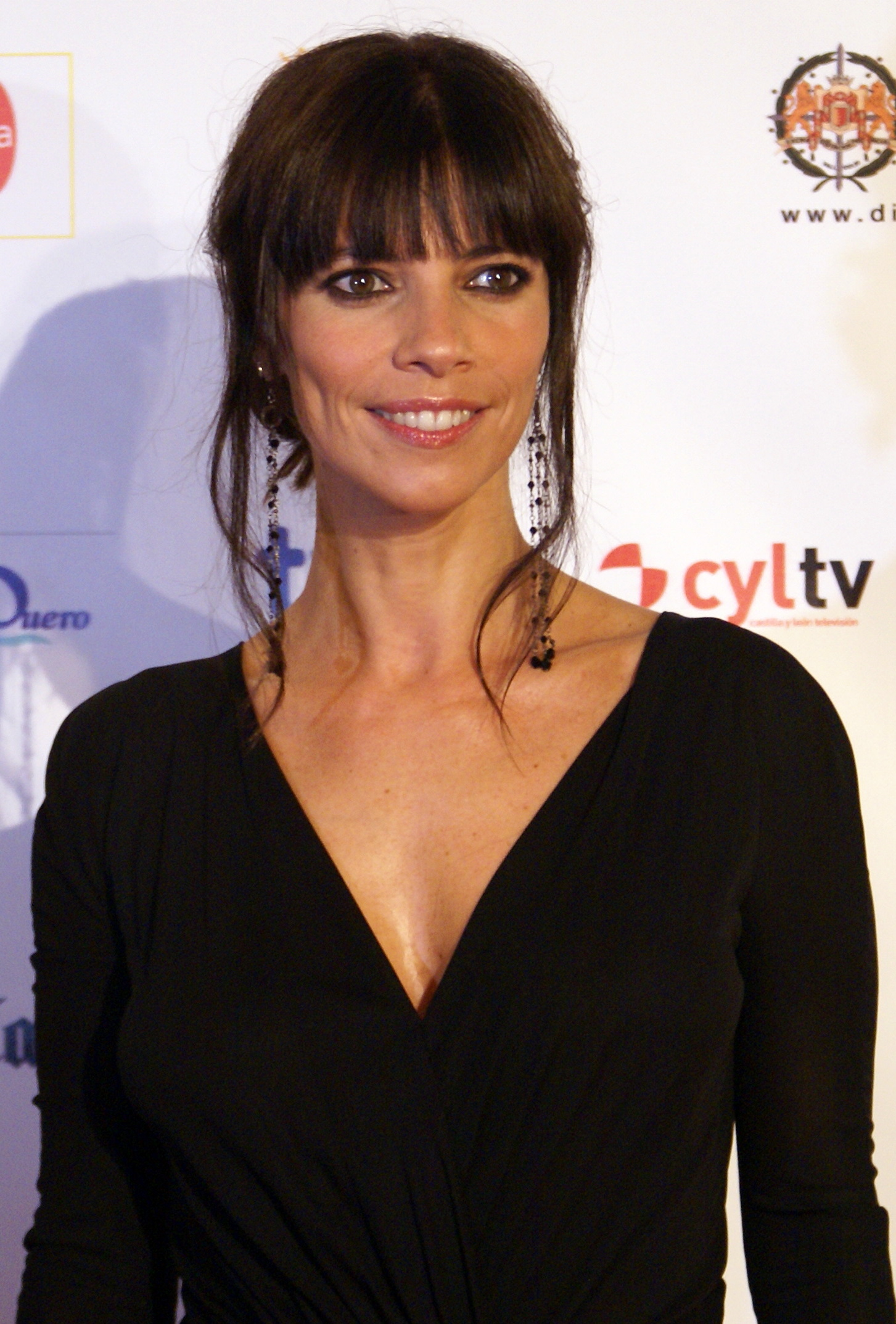
Maribel Verdú was nominated eight times and won twice for Seven Billiard Tables in 2007 and Snow White in 2012

Year	Actress	Role(s)	English title	Original title
2000 (15th)	Carmen Maura ‡	Julia García	Common Wealth	La comunidad
2000 (15th)	Icíar Bollaín	Leo	Leo	
2000 (15th)	Lydia Bosch	Julia	You're the One	Una historia de entonces
2000 (15th)	Adriana Ozores	Susana Grey	Plenilune	Plenilunio
2001 (16th)	Pilar López de Ayala ‡	Joanna of Castile	Mad Love	Juana la Loca
2001 (16th)	Victoria Abril	Lola Nevado	Don't Tempt Me	Sin noticias de Dios
2001 (16th)	Nicole Kidman	Grace Stewart	The Others	The Others
2001 (16th)	Paz Vega	Angela	Mine Alone	Sólo mía
2002 (17th)	Mercedes Sampietro ‡	Liliana Rovira	Common Ground	Lugares comunes
2002 (17th)	Ana Fernández	Andrea	Story of a Kiss	Historia de un beso
2002 (17th)	Adriana Ozores	Ágata	Nobody's Life	La vida de nadie
2002 (17th)	Leonor Watling	Elvira	My Mother Likes Women	A mi madre le gustan las mujeres
2003 (18th)	Laia Marull ‡	Pilar Pérez Villar	Take My Eyes	Te doy mis ojos
2003 (18th)	Ariadna Gil	Lola Cercas	Soldiers of Salamis	Soldados de Salamina
2003 (18th)	Adriana Ozores	Amparo	Sleeping Luck	La suerte dormida
2003 (18th)	Sarah Polley	Ann	My Life Without Me	
2004 (19th)	Lola Dueñas ‡	Rosa	The Sea Inside	Mar adentro
2004 (19th)	Pilar Bardem	María Zambrano	Dearest Maria	María querida
2004 (19th)	Ana Belén	Hortensia Ocaña	Things That Make Living Worthwhile	Cosas que hacen que la vida valga la pena
2004 (19th)	Penélope Cruz	Italia	Don't Move	Non ti muovere
2005 (20th)	Candela Peña ‡	Caye	Princesas	
2005 (20th)	Adriana Ozores	Pilar	Heroine	Heroína
2005 (20th)	Nathalie Poza	Ana	Hard Times	Malas temporadas
2005 (20th)	Emma Vilarasau	Irene	Something to Remember Me By	Para que no me olvides
2006 (21st)	Penélope Cruz ‡	Raimunda	Volver	
2006 (21st)	Silvia Abascal	Finea	The Idiot Maiden	La dama boba
2006 (21st)	Marta Etura	Paula	Dark Blue Almost Black	Azuloscurocasinegro
2006 (21st)	Maribel Verdú	Mercedes	Pan's Labyrinth	El laberinto del fauno
2007 (22nd)	Maribel Verdú ‡	Ángela Montero	Seven Billiard Tables	Siete mesas de billar francés
2007 (22nd)	Belén Rueda	Laura García	The Orphanage	El orfanato
2007 (22nd)	Blanca Portillo	Charo Gil	Seven Billiard Tables	Siete mesas de billar francés
2007 (22nd)	Emma Suárez	Nines	Under the Stars	Bajo las estrellas
2008 (23rd)	Carme Elías ‡	Gloria Usaola	Camino	
2008 (23rd)	Verónica Echegui	Isa	My Prison Yard	El patio de mi cárcel
2008 (23rd)	Ariadna Gil	Aurora Rodríguez	Just Walking	Sólo quiero caminar
2008 (23rd)	Maribel Verdú	Elena Vadillo	The Blind Sunflowers	Los girasoles ciegos
2009 (24th)	Lola Dueñas ‡	Laura Valiente	Me Too	Yo, también
2009 (24th)	Penélope Cruz	Magdalena Rivas	Broken Embraces	Los abrazos rotos
2009 (24th)	Maribel Verdú	Miranda	Tetro	
2009 (24th)	Rachel Weisz	Hypatia	Agora	Ágora

=== 2010s ===
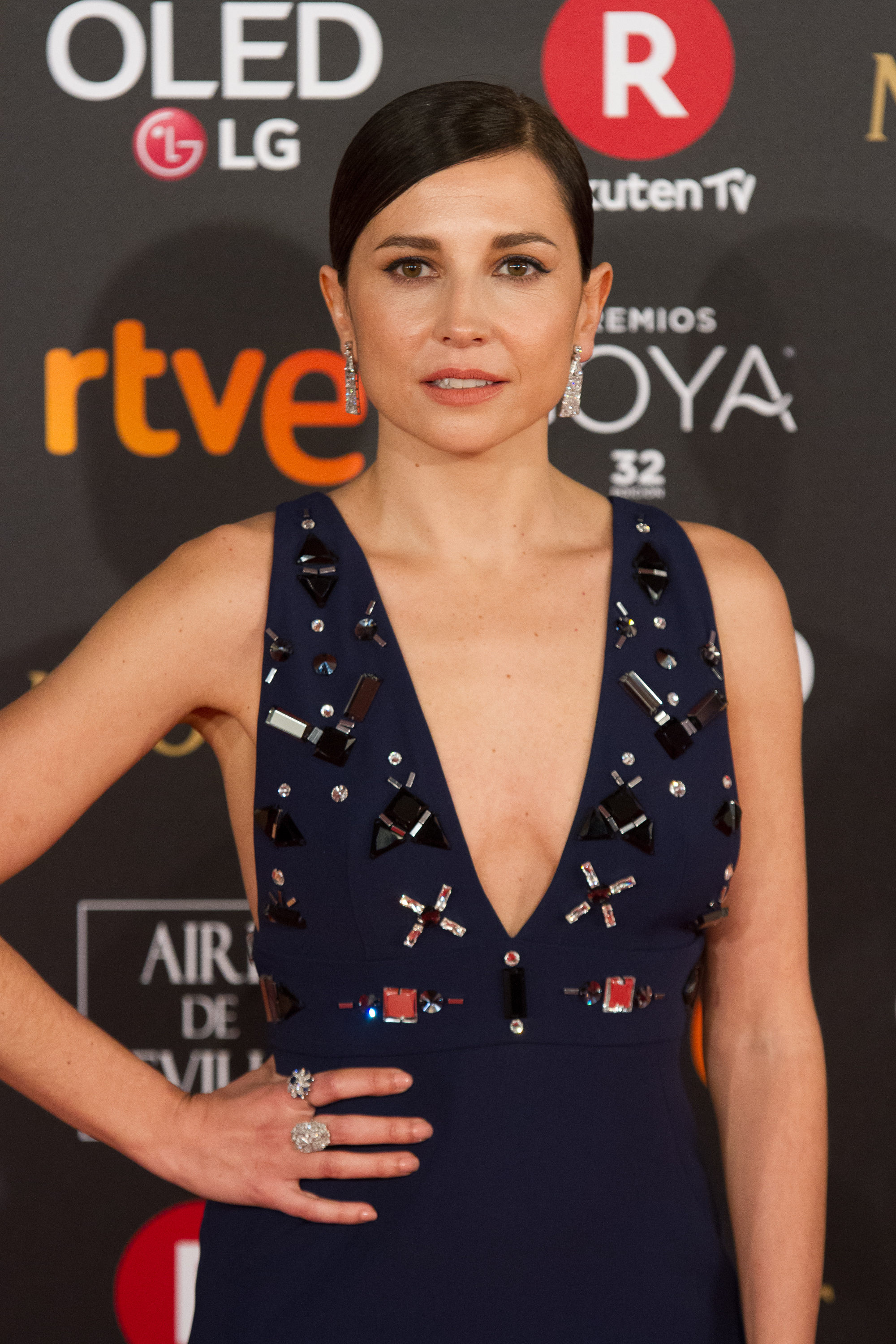
Marian Álvarez won for Wounded in 2013.

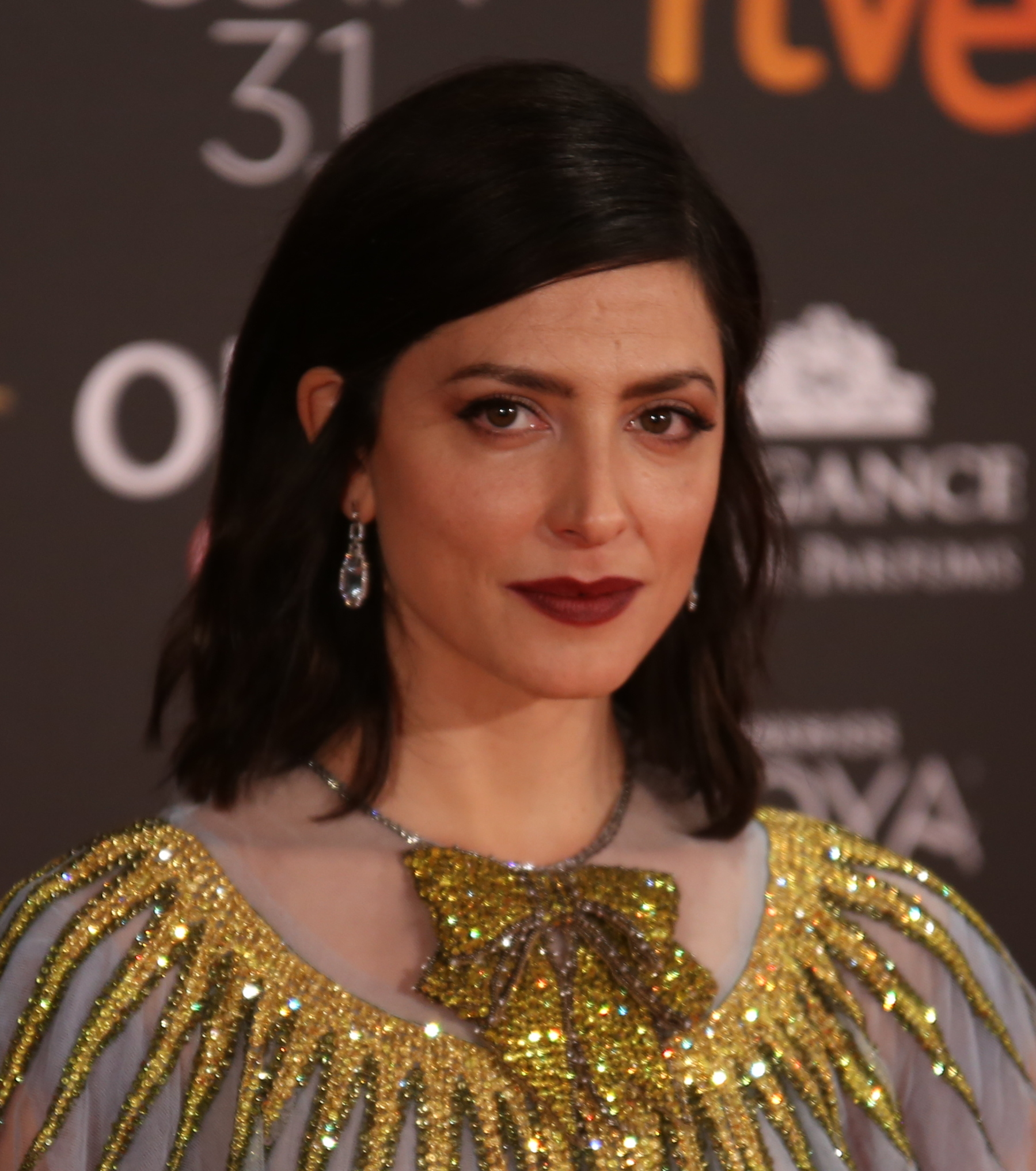
Bárbara Lennie won for Magical Girl in 2014.

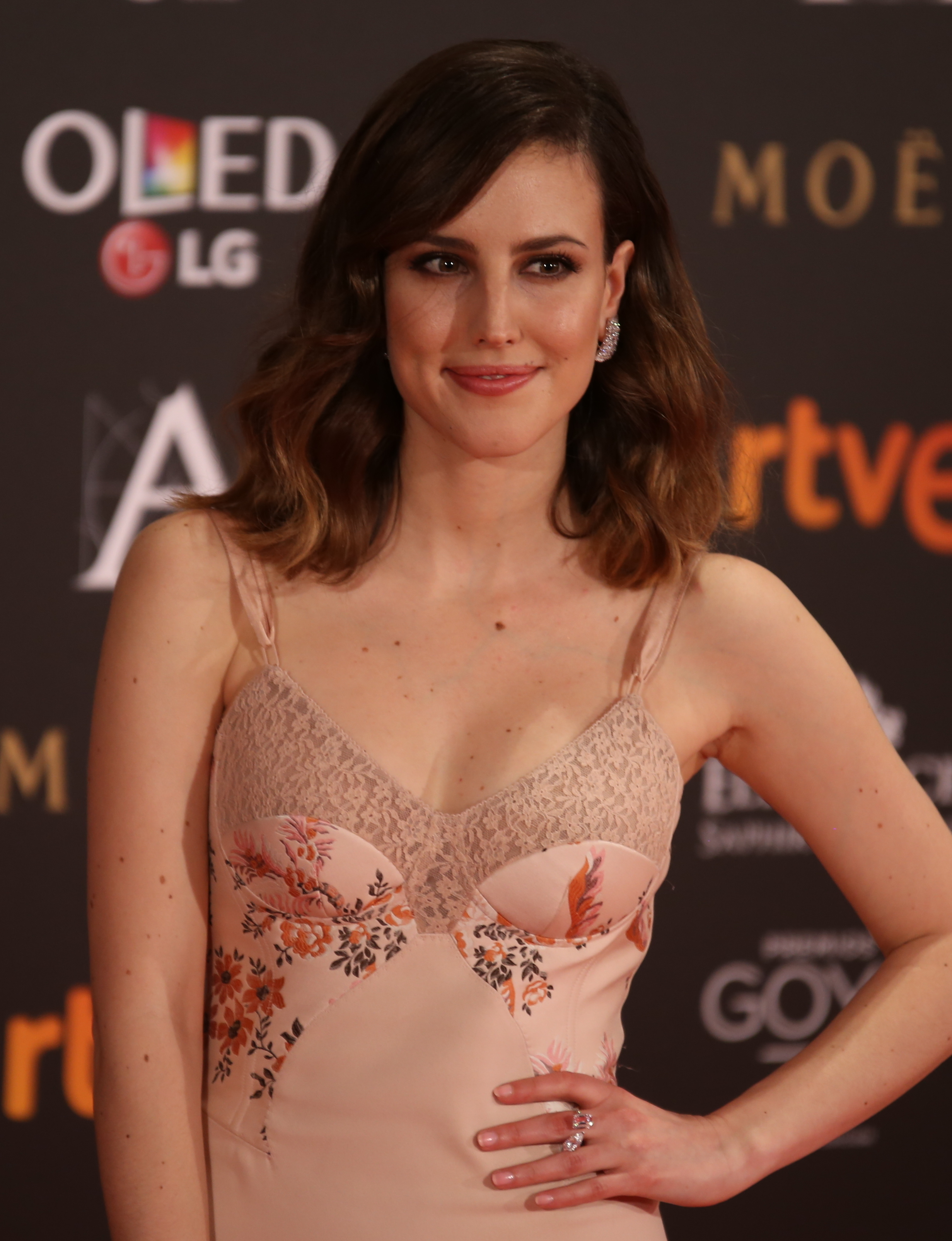
Natalia de Molina won for Food and Shelter in 2015.

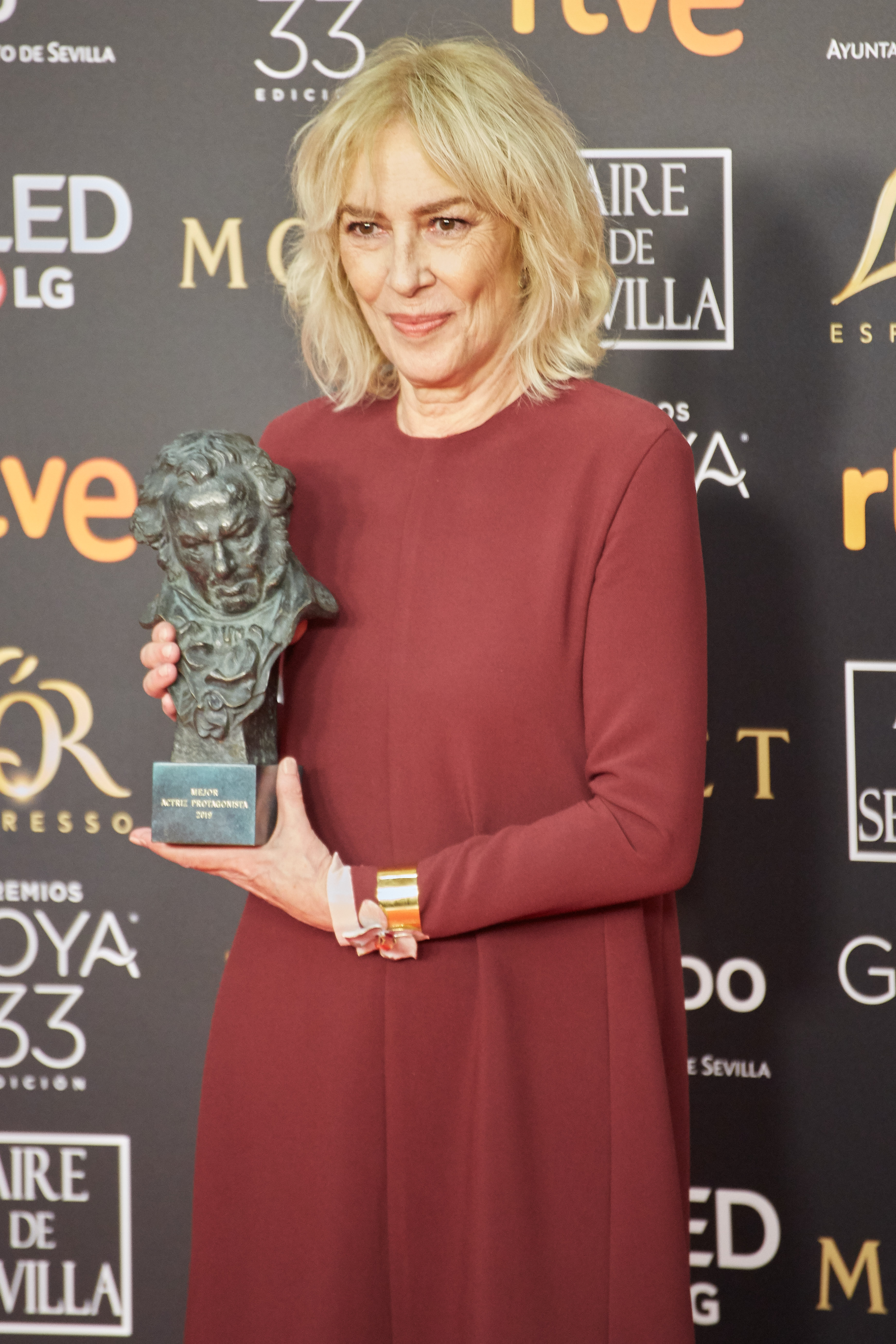
Susi Sánchez won for Sunday's Illness (2018)

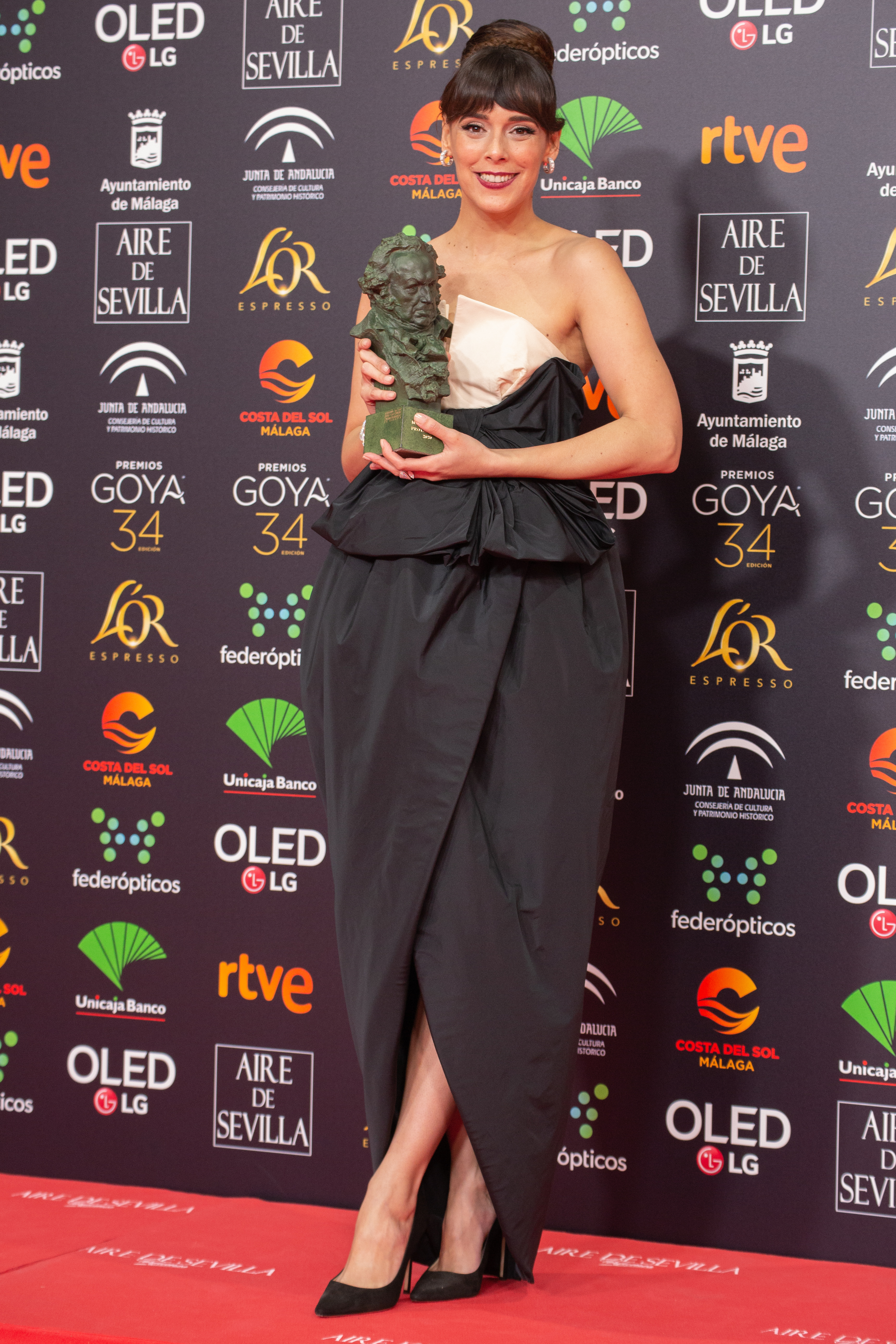
Belén Cuesta won for The Endless Trench (2019)

Year	Actress	Role(s)	English title	Original title
2010 (25th)	Nora Navas ‡	Florència	Black Bread	Pa negre
2010 (25th)	Elena Anaya	Alba	Room in Rome	Habitación en Roma
2010 (25th)	Emma Suárez	Alícia	The Mosquito Net	La mosquitera
2010 (25th)	Belén Rueda	Julia Levin / Sara	Julia's Eyes	Los ojos de Julia
2011 (26th)	Elena Anaya ‡	Vera Cruz / Gal Ledgard	The Skin I Live In	La piel que habito
2011 (26th)	Verónica Echegui	Laia	Kathmandu Lullaby	Katmandú, un espejo en el cielo
2011 (26th)	Salma Hayek	Luisa Gómez	As Luck Would Have It	La chispa de la vida
2011 (26th)	Inma Cuesta	Hortensia Rodríguez	The Sleeping Voice	La voz dormida
2012 (27th)	Maribel Verdú ‡	Encarna	Blancanieves	
2012 (27th)	Penélope Cruz	Gemma	Twice Born	Venuto al mondo
2012 (27th)	Aida Folch	Mercè	The Artist and the Model	El artista y la modelo
2012 (27th)	Naomi Watts	María Bennet	The Impossible	The Impossible
2013 (28th)	Marian Álvarez ‡	Ana	Wounded	La herida
2013 (28th)	Inma Cuesta	Ruth Belloso	Three Many Weddings	Tres bodas de más
2013 (28th)	Aura Garrido	Ella	Stockholm	Stockholm
2013 (28th)	Nora Navas	Geni Moncada	We All Want What's Best for Her	Tots volem el millor per a ella
2014 (29th)	Bárbara Lennie ‡	Bárbara	Magical Girl	
2014 (29th)	María León	Sara	Marseille	Marsella
2014 (29th)	Macarena Gómez	Montse	Shrew's Nest	Musarañas
2014 (29th)	Elena Anaya	Lupe	They Are All Dead	Todos Están Muertos
2015 (30th)	Natalia de Molina ‡	Rocío Gómez	Food and Shelter	Techo y comida
2015 (30th)	Inma Cuesta	The Bride	The Bride	La novia
2015 (30th)	Penélope Cruz	Magda	Ma Ma	Ma ma
2015 (30th)	Juliette Binoche	Josephine Peary	Nobody Wants the Night	Nadie quiere la noche
2016 (31st)	Emma Suárez ‡	Julieta Arcos	Julieta	
2016 (31st)	Penélope Cruz	Macarena Granada	The Queen of Spain	La reina de España
2016 (31st)	Bárbara Lennie	María Funes	María (and Everybody Else)	María (y los demás)
2016 (31st)	Carmen Machi	Rosa	The Open Door	La puerta abierta
2017 (32nd)	Nathalie Poza ‡	Carla Miralles	Can't Say Goodbye	No sé decir adiós
2017 (32nd)	Emily Mortimer	Florence Green	The Bookshop	
2017 (32nd)	Penélope Cruz	Virginia Vallejo	Loving Pablo	
2017 (32nd)	Maribel Verdú	Carmen	Abracadabra	
2018 (33rd)	Susi Sánchez ‡	Anabel Barnuevo	Sunday's Illness	La enfermedad del domingo
2018 (33rd)	Najwa Nimri	Lila Cassen	Quién te cantará	
2018 (33rd)	Penélope Cruz	Laura	Everybody Knows	Todos lo saben
2018 (33rd)	Lola Dueñas	Estrella Aranda	Journey to a Mother's Room	Viaje al cuarto de una madre
2019 (34th)	Belén Cuesta ‡	Rosa Domínguez	The Endless Trench	La trinchera infinita
2019 (34th)	Penélope Cruz	Jacinta	Pain and Glory	Dolor y gloria
2019 (34th)	Greta Fernández	Sara Garrido	A Thief's Daughter	La hija de un ladrón
2019 (34th)	Marta Nieto	Elena	Mother	Madre

=== 2020s ===
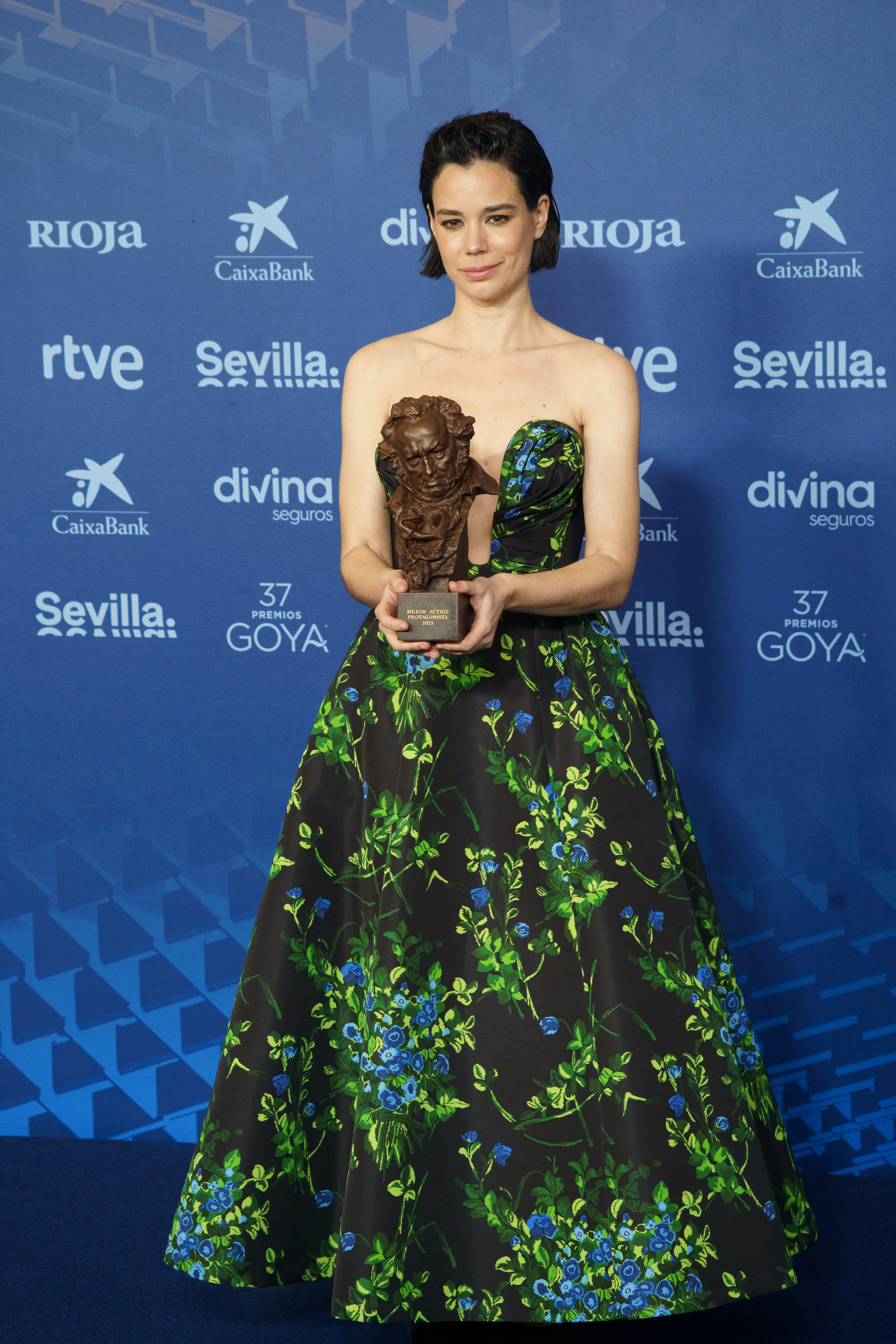
Laia Costa won for Lullaby (2022)

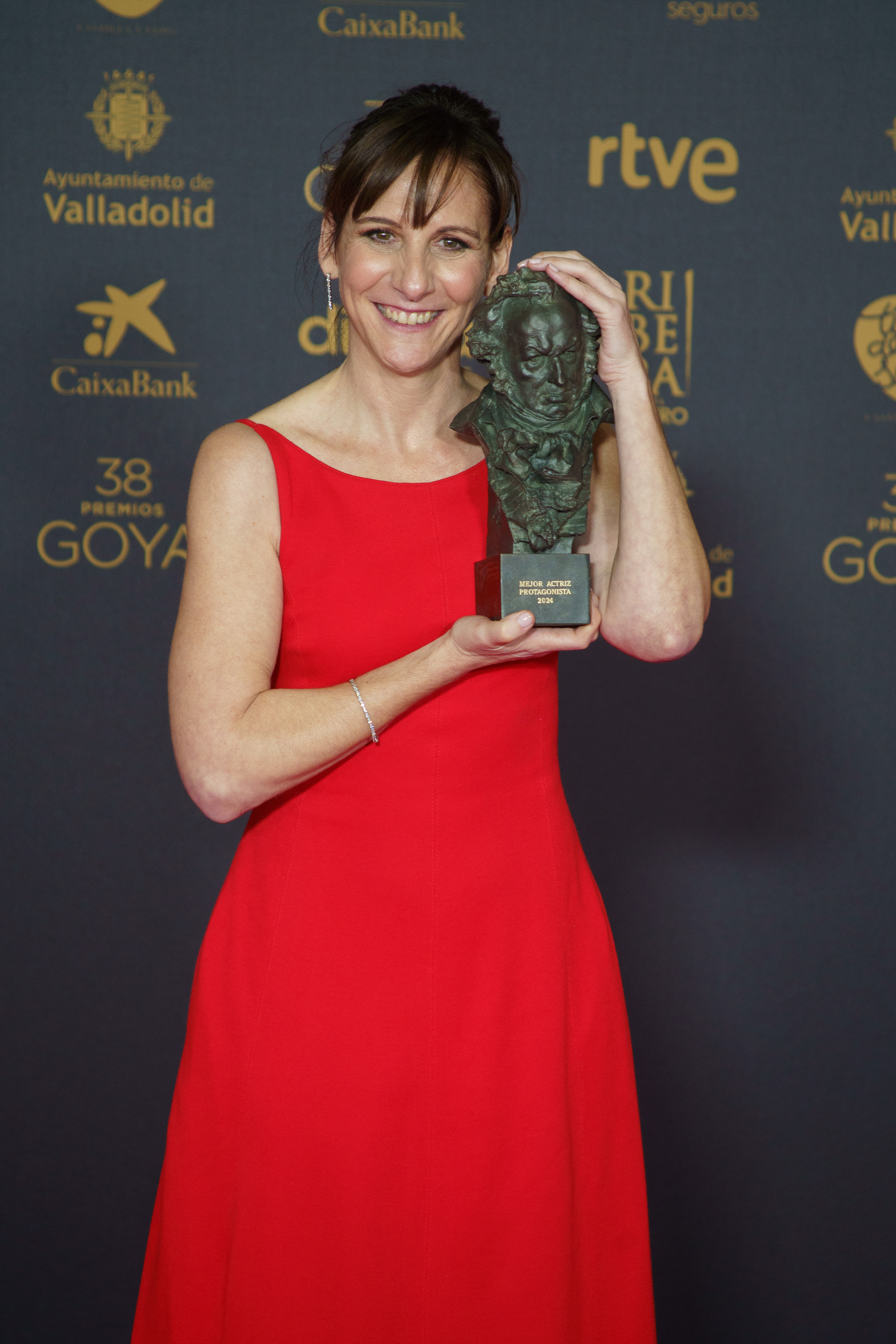
Malena Alterio won for Something Is About to Happen (2023)

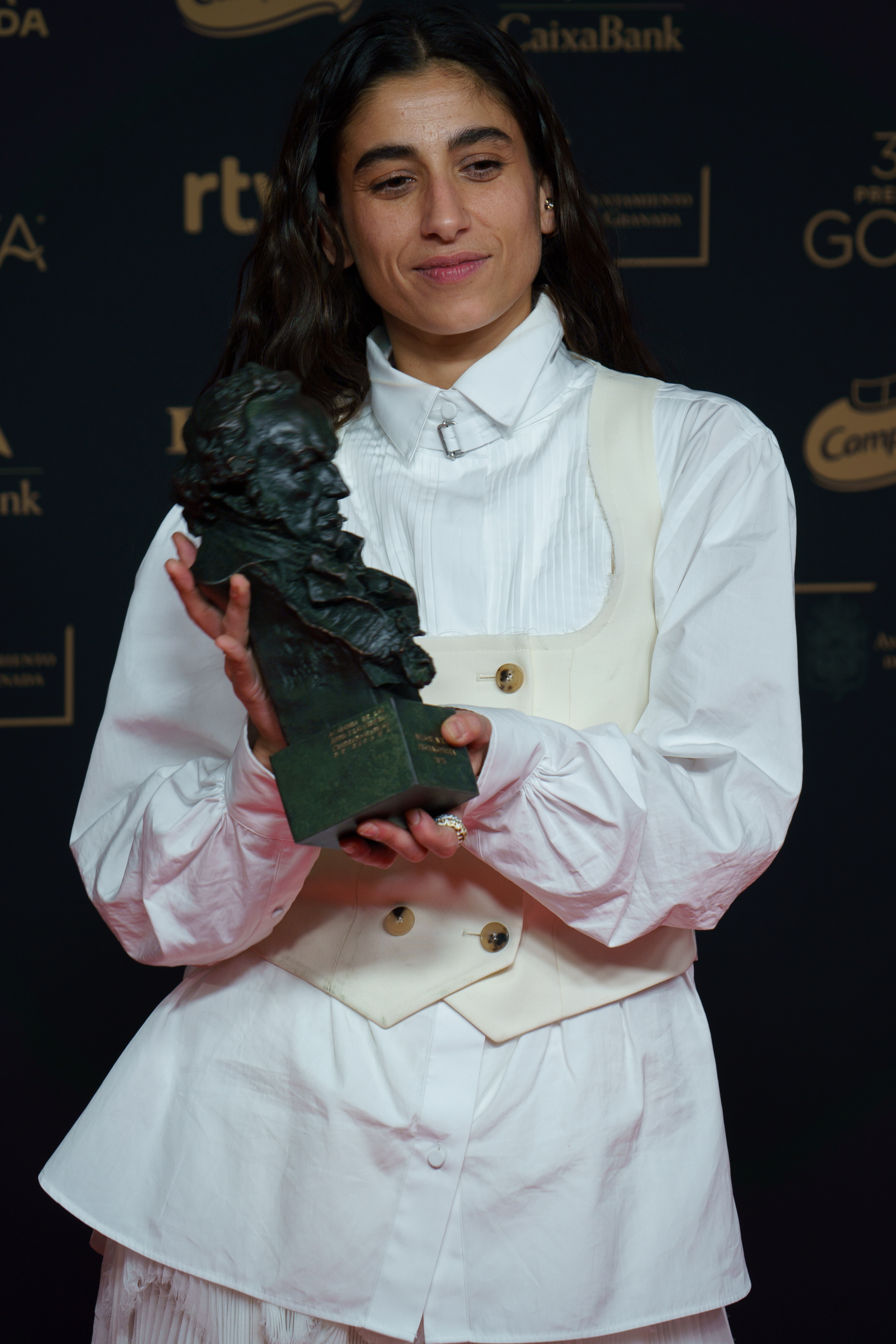
Carolina Yuste won for Undercover (2024)

Year	Actress	Role(s)	English title	Original title
2020 (35th)	Patricia López Arnaiz ‡	Lide Sagasti	Ane Is Missing	Ane
2020 (35th)	Amaia Aberasturi	Ana Ibarguren	Coven	Akelarre
2020 (35th)	Kiti Mánver	Lola Cruz	One Careful Owner	El inconveniente
2020 (35th)	Candela Peña	Rosa Román	Rosa's Wedding	La boda de Rosa
2021 (36th)	Blanca Portillo ‡	Maixabel Lasa	Maixabel	
2021 (36th)	Emma Suárez	Berta	Josephine	Josefina
2021 (36th)	Petra Martínez	María	That Was Life	La vida era eso
2021 (36th)	Penélope Cruz	Janis Martínez Moreno	Parallel Mothers	Madres paralelas
2022 (37th)	Laia Costa ‡	Amaia	Lullaby	Cinco lobitos
2022 (37th)	Marina Foïs	Olga Denis	The Beasts	As bestas
2022 (37th)	Anna Castillo	Julia	Wild Flowers	Girasoles silvestres
2022 (37th)	Bárbara Lennie	Alice Gould	God's Crooked Lines	Los renglones torcidos de Dios
2022 (37th)	Vicky Luengo	Elena	Cork	Suro
2023 (38th)	Malena Alterio ‡	Lucía	Something Is About to Happen	Que nadie duerma
2023 (38th)	Patricia López Arnaiz	Ane	20,000 Species of Bees	20.000 especies de abejas
2023 (38th)	María Vázquez	Ramona	Matria	
2023 (38th)	Carolina Yuste	Conchita	Jokes & Cigarettes	Saben aquell
2023 (38th)	Laia Costa	Nat	Un amor	
2024 (39th)	Carolina Yuste ‡	Mónica / Arantxa	Undercover	La infiltrada
2024 (39th)	Emma Vilarasau	Montse	A House on Fire	Casa en flames
2024 (39th)	Julianne Moore	Ingrid Parker	The Room Next Door	La habitación de al lado
2024 (39th)	Tilda Swinton	Martha Hunt	The Room Next Door	La habitación de al lado
2024 (39th)	Patricia López Arnaiz	Isabel	Glimmers	Los destellos
2025 (40th)	Patricia López Arnaiz	Maite	Sundays	Los domingos
2025 (40th)	Ángela Cervantes	Alexandra	Fury	La furia
2025 (40th)	Antonia Zegers	Delia	The Exiles	Los Tortuga
2025 (40th)	Nora Navas	Eva	My Friend Eva	Mi amiga Eva
2025 (40th)	Susana Abaitua	Amaia	She Walks in Darkness	Un fantasma en la batalla

== Multiple wins and nominations ==
The following individuals received two or more Best Actress awards:

Wins	Actress
3	Carmen Maura
2	Cecilia Roth
2	Lola Dueñas
2	Verónica Forqué
2	Emma Suárez
2	Maribel Verdú
2	Penélope Cruz
2	Patricia López Arnaiz

The following individuals received three or more Best Actress nominations:

Nominations	Actress
12	Penélope Cruz
8	Victoria Abril
8	Maribel Verdú
6	Emma Suárez
5	Carmen Maura
5	Ariadna Gil
4	Ana Belén
4	Adriana Ozores
4	Patricia López Arnaiz
3	Elena Anaya
3	Inma Cuesta
3	Lola Dueñas
3	Verónica Forqué
3	Bárbara Lennie
3	Ángela Molina
3	Nora Navas
