= Half of Heaven =

1986 film

- Theatrical release poster
- Spanish: La mitad del cielo
- Directed by: Manuel Gutiérrez Aragón
- Written by: Luis Megino; Manuel Gutiérrez Aragón
- Starring: Ángela Molina; Margarita Lozano; Antonio Valero; Nacho Martínez; Santiago Ramos; Carolina Silva; F. Fernán Gómez
- Cinematography: José Luis Alcaine
- Edited by: José Salcedo
- Music by: Milladoiro
- Release dates: September 1986 (Zinemaldia); 9 October 1986 (Spain)
- Running time: 127 minutes
- Country: Spain
- Language: Spanish

Half of Heaven (Spanish: La mitad del cielo) is a 1986 Spanish drama film directed by Manuel Gutiérrez Aragón. The film was selected as the Spanish entry for the Best Foreign Language Film at the 59th Academy Awards, but was not accepted as a nominee.

== Cast ==
- Ángela Molina as Rosa
- Margarita Lozano as Abuela
- Fernando Fernán Gómez as Don Pedro
- Antonio Valero as Juan
- Nacho Martínez as Delgado
- Santiago Ramos as Antonio
- Carolina Silva as Olvido
- Francisco Merino as Ramiro
- Enriqueta Carballeira as Hermana de Rosa
- Julia Martínez as Cuñada de Don Pedro
- Mónica Molina as Rosa joven

== Release ==
The film was theatrically released in Spain on 9 October 1986, grossing 207 million ₧ (681,393 admissions) in the domestic market.

== Accolades ==
Year	Award	Category	Nominee(s)	Result	Ref.
1986	34th San Sebastián International Film Festival	Golden Shell		Won	
1986	34th San Sebastián International Film Festival	Silver Shell for Best Actress	Ángela Molina	Won	
1987	1st Goya Awards	Best Film		Nominated	
1987	1st Goya Awards	Best Actress	Ángela Molina	Nominated	
1987	1st Goya Awards	Best Cinematography	José Luis Alcaine	Nominated	
1987	1st Goya Awards	Best Music	Milladoiro	Won	
1987	1st Goya Awards	Best Costume Design	Gerardo Vera	Nominated	

== See also ==
- List of Spanish films of 1986
- List of submissions to the 59th Academy Awards for Best Foreign Language Film
- List of Spanish submissions for the Academy Award for Best Foreign Language Film
