= Little Revenge =

1986 Venezuelan film

- Film poster
- Spanish: Pequeña revancha
- Directed by: Olegario Barrera Monteverde
- Written by: Olegario Barrera Monteverde; Laura Antillano
- Based on: "La composición" by Antonio Skármeta
- Produced by: Alfredo Anzola; Jorge Gherrardy; Gustavo Rosario
- Starring: Carlos Sanchez Torrealba
- Cinematography: Alfredo Anzola
- Edited by: Marisa Bafile; Olegario Barrera Monteverde; Luisa De La Ville
- Music by: Irina Kircher; Alfonso Montes
- Release date: November 4, 1985
- Running time: 95 minutes
- Country: Venezuela
- Language: Spanish

Little Revenge (Spanish: Pequeña revancha) is a 1985 Venezuelan film directed by Olegario Barrera Monteverde, with his screenplay based on the story La composición (English: The Composition) by Chilean writer Antonio Skármeta.

== Plot ==
Pedro is a 12-year-old boy who lives in a village where any question is answered with repression. He has a girlfriend, Matilde, and a dog, Rocky. The teacher and father of a friend are arrested by the military. The death of his dog makes him look for revenge.

== Reception ==
The film was nominated for the 1st Goya Awards as Best Iberoamerican Film. It also received the TVE Special Award for New Directors at the 1985 San Sebastián International Film Festival and the Critics' and Jury Awards at the Havana Film Festival.

== Bibliography ==
- Literatura y cine en Venezuela, Diana Medina Meléndez
