= The House Must Be Unmade =

1986 film by José Luis García Sánchez

- Theatrical release poster
- Spanish: Hay que deshacer la casa
- Directed by: José Luis García Sánchez
- Screenplay by: Rafael Azcona; José Luis García Sánchez
- Based on: Hay que deshacer la casa by Sebastián Junyent
- Produced by: Luis Sanz
- Starring: Amparo Rivelles; Amparo Soler Leal; Joaquín Kremel; José Mª Pou; Luis Merlo; Guillermo Montesinos; Francisco Valladares; Antonio Gamero; Agustín González; José Luis López Vázquez
- Cinematography: Jose Luis Alcaine
- Edited by: Pablo G. del Amo
- Music by: Miguel Morales
- Production companies: Lince Films; Jet Films; Incine
- Release date: 3 October 1986
- Country: Spain
- Language: Spanish

The House Must Be Unmade (Spanish: Hay que deshacer la casa) is a 1986 Spanish comedy film directed by José Luis García Sánchez from a screenplay co-written by Rafael Azcona based on the play by Sebastián Junyent. It stars Amparo Rivelles and Amparo Soler Leal.

== Plot ==
Ana returns from Paris to Guadalajara to solve the issue about her deceased parents' inheritance with her sister Laura, recruiting the help of unemployed homosexual priest Ramón.

== Cast ==
- Amparo Rivelles as Laura
- Amparo Soler Leal as Ana
- Joaquín Kremel as Frutos
- José María Pou as Ramón
- Luis Merlo as Marcelo
- Guillermo Montesinos as limpiabotas
- Francisco Valladares as político
- Luis Ciges as cacharrero
- Antonio Gamero as político
- Félix Rotaeta as Crespo
- Agustín Gonzalez as Huete
- José Luis López Vázquez as Pepe Luis

== Production ==
Shooting locations included Guadalajara.

== Release ==
The film was released theatrically in Spain on 3 October 1986.

== Accolades ==
Amparo Rivelles won the 1st Goya Awards for Best Actress in 1987.

== See also ==
- List of Spanish films of 1986
