= Jarrapellejos =

1988 film

- Theatrical release poster
- Directed by: Antonio Giménez-Rico
- Screenplay by: Antonio Giménez-Rico; Manuel Gutiérrez Aragón
- Based on: Jarrapellejos by Felipe Trigo
- Produced by: José Joaquín Aguirre; José G. Blanco Sola
- Starring: Antonio Ferrandis; Juan Diego; Lydia Bosch; Amparo Larrañaga; Joaquín Hinojosa; Miguel A. Rellán; Aitana Sánchez-Gijón; Carlos Tristancho; Florinda Chico; José Coronado
- Cinematography: José Luis Alcaine
- Edited by: Miguel González Sinde
- Music by: Carmelo Bernaola
- Distributed by: Warner Española
- Release date: 19 February 1988
- Running time: 90 minutes
- Country: Spain
- Language: Spanish

Jarrapellejos is a 1988 Spanish drama film directed by Antonio Giménez-Rico based on the 1914 novel of the same name by Felipe Trigo. Set in La Joya, Extremadura, the plot straddles between the social denunciation and the costumbrista portrait, featuring the misdeeds of local cacique Jarrapellejos.

== Cast ==
- Antonio Ferrandis as Pedro Luis Jarrapellejos
- Juan Diego as Saturnino
- Lydia Bosch as Ernesta
- Amparo Larrañaga as Purita
- Joaquín Hinojosa as Juan Cidoncha
- Miguel A. Rellán as Gato
- Aitana Sánchez-Gijón as Isabel
- Carlos Tristancho as Mariano
- Florinda Chico as María del Carmen
- José Coronado as Octavio Trillo

== Release ==
Distributed by Warner Española, the film was released theatrically in Spain on 19 February 1988. It was entered into the 38th Berlin International Film Festival.

== See also ==
- List of Spanish films of 1988

== Bibliography ==
- García-Abad García, M.ª Teresa (2020). "De «gatas de salón» y walkyrias: modelos de mujer en Jarrapellejos (Felipe Trigo/Antonio Giménez-Rico)". In Bonilla Cerezo, Rafael (ed.). Aitana Sánchez-Gijón: Cintas y letras. Grupo Editorial Sial Pigmalión. pp. 25–54. hdl:10261/237803. ISBN 9788418333323.
