= Lola (1986 film) =

- Theatrical release poster
- Directed by: Bigas Luna
- Screenplay by: Luis Herce; Bigas Luna; Enrique Viciano
- Produced by: Enrique Viciano
- Starring: Ángela Molina; Patrick Bauchau; Féodor Atkine; Assumpta Serna; Carme Sansa; Pepa López; Constantino Romero; Ángela Gutiérrez
- Cinematography: José María Civit
- Edited by: Ernest Blasi
- Music by: José Manuel Pagán
- Production company: Figaró Films
- Distributed by: Ópalo Films
- Release date: 17 January 1986
- Running time: 106 minutes
- Country: Spain
- Language: Spanish

Lola is a 1986 Spanish drama film directed by Bigas Luna which stars Ángela Molina as the title character. Patrick Bauchau, Féodor Atkine, and Assumpta Serna co-star.

== Plot ==
Shoemaking worker Lola lefts husband Mario and then begins a relationship with French car manufacturing manager Robert, but the former re-appears and upends Lola's life.

== Cast ==
- Ángela Molina as Lola
- Patrick Bauchau as Robert
- Féodor Atkine as Mario
- Assumpta Serna as Silvia
- Carme Sansa as Jeanine
- Pepa López as Isabel
- Constantino Romero as Alberto
- Ángela Gutiérrez as Ana
- Ariadna Gil as Ana adolescente

== Production ==
The film is a Figaró Films production.

== Release ==
The film was released theatrically in Barcelona on 17 January 1986 and in Madrid on 17 February 1986.

== Reception ==
Octavi Martí of El País assessed that Bigas Lunas tries to mask various script flaws "by skilfully taking great care with the packaging".

== See also ==
- List of Spanish films of 1986
