= 27 Hours =

- Theatrical release poster
- Spanish: 27 horas
- Directed by: Montxo Armendáriz
- Written by: Montxo Armendáriz; Elías Querejeta
- Produced by: Elías Querejeta
- Starring: Martxelo Rubio; Maribel Verdú; Jon Donosti; Antonio Banderas
- Cinematography: Javier Aguirresarobe
- Music by: Ángel Illarramendi
- Production company: Elías Querejeta PC
- Release date: September 1986 (SSIFF)
- Country: Spain
- Language: Spanish

27 Hours (Spanish: 27 horas) is a 1986 Spanish quinqui film directed by Montxo Armendáriz which stars Martxelo Rubio, Maribel Verdú and Jon Donosti, also featuring the collaboration of Antonio Banderas.

== Plot ==
Set in 1980s San Sebastián, the plot tracks three friends (Jon, Patxi and Maite) over the course of 27 hours, two of which are a couple hooked on heroin and the other one works as dockworker.

== Cast ==
- Martxelo Rubio as Jon
- Jon Donosti as Patxi
- Maribel Verdú as Maite
- Antonio Banderas as Santa
- André Falcón as Jon's uncle
- Josu Balbuena as Xavi
- Michel Duperrer as Maite's brother
- Silvia Arrese-Igor as Jon's sister
- Michel Berasategui as Jon's father
- Esther Román as Jon's mother

== Production ==
The screenplay was penned by Montxo Armendáriz alongside Elías Querejeta. An Elías Querejeta PC production, the film was shot in San Sebastián, Gipuzkoa. It had the support of ETB. The score was authored by Ángel Illarramendi whereas Javier Aguirresarobe took over the cinematography. The film was shot in Spanish.

== Release ==
The film screened at the 34th San Sebastián International Film Festival in September 1986.

== Accolades ==
Year	Award	Category	Nominee(s)	Result	Ref.
1987	1st Goya Awards	Best Film		Nominated	

== See also ==
- List of Spanish films of 1986
