= Dear Nanny =

1986 film by José Luis Borau

- Theatrical release poster
- Spanish: Tata mía
- Directed by: José Luis Borau
- Written by: José Luis Borau
- Starring: Imperio Argentina; Alfredo Landa; Carmen Maura; Xabier Elorriaga; Marisa Paredes; Miguel Rellán
- Cinematography: Teo Escamilla
- Edited by: Emilio Rodríguez
- Music by: Jacobo Durán Loriga
- Production companies: El Imán; Isasi PC
- Distributed by: Profilmar
- Release date: 18 December 1986
- Running time: 100 min
- Country: Spain
- Language: Spanish

Dear Nanny (Spanish: Tata mía) is a 1986 Spanish drama film directed and written by José Luis Borau and starring Imperio Argentina, Alfredo Landa and Carmen Maura. It is scored by Jacobo Durán Loriga. José Luis Borau was nominated to a Goya Award for Best Original Screenplay and Miguel Rellán won the Goya Award for Best Supporting Actor in the 1987 edition.

== Cast ==
- Imperio Argentina as Tata
- Alfredo Landa as Teo
- Carmen Maura as Elvira
- Xabier Elorriaga as Peter
- Miguel Rellán as Alberto
- Marisa Paredes as Paloma
- Julieta Serrano as Magda
- Enriqueta Carballeira as Amelia
- Emma Suárez as Cristina
- Paloma Gómez as Almudena
- Alicia Moro as Rubia
- Saturno Cerra as Puente
- Chema Mazo as Germán
- Matías Maluenda as Uncle Bordetas
- Félix Dafauce as Notary
- Adrián Ortega as Editor
- Jordi Batalla as Sepúlveda
- Eduardo MacGregor as Luján
- Juan Jesús Valverde as Laín
- Paco Catalá as Taxista
- Gonzalo Cañas as Drivers school teacher
- Ana María Ventura as Chief Nurse
- Paloma Suárez as Nurse
- Ignacio Moreno as Hunter #1
- Emilio Lacambra as Hunter #2
- Javier Gómez de Pablo as Hunter #3
- Luis Revuelta Comte as Priest
- Pedro Zapater as Child
- Ángeles Caso as Periodista

== Production ==
Rafaela Aparicio, Fernando Fernán Gómez, and Concha Velasco were originally intended to portray Tata, Teo, and Elvira, but they had to decline. Borau later argued that Imperio, Landa, and Maura represented by themselves three eras of Spanish cinema. Shooting locations included Mallos de Riglos and an apartment at the Calle de Alfonso XII near El Retiro.

== Release ==
Dear Nanny was released theatrically in Spain on 18 December 1986. It grossed 68,114,656 ₧ (218,663 admissions).

== Reception ==
Ángel Fernández-Santos of El País lamented that Elorriaga's character's lack of plausibility wounds the film at its heart, damaging a work that is [otherwise] "full of cinematic intelligence and rigor in its execution".

== Accolades ==
Year	Award	Category	Nominee(s)	Result	Ref.
1987	1st Goya Awards	Best Screenplay	José Luis Borau	Nominated	
1987	1st Goya Awards	Best Supporting Actor	Miguel Rellán	Won	

== See also ==
- List of Spanish films of 1986

== Bibliography ==
- Barrenetxea Marañón, Igor (2016). "Tata mía (1986) o el espíritu de la Transición" [Tata mía (1986) or the spirit of Transition]. Aportes (91): 215–247. ISSN 0213-5868.
- Caparrós Lera, J.M. (1992). El cine español de la democracia: de la muerte de Franco al «cambio» socialista (1975-1989). Barcelona: Anthropos. ISBN 84-7658-312-5.
