= Lope de Vega Theatre (Madrid) =

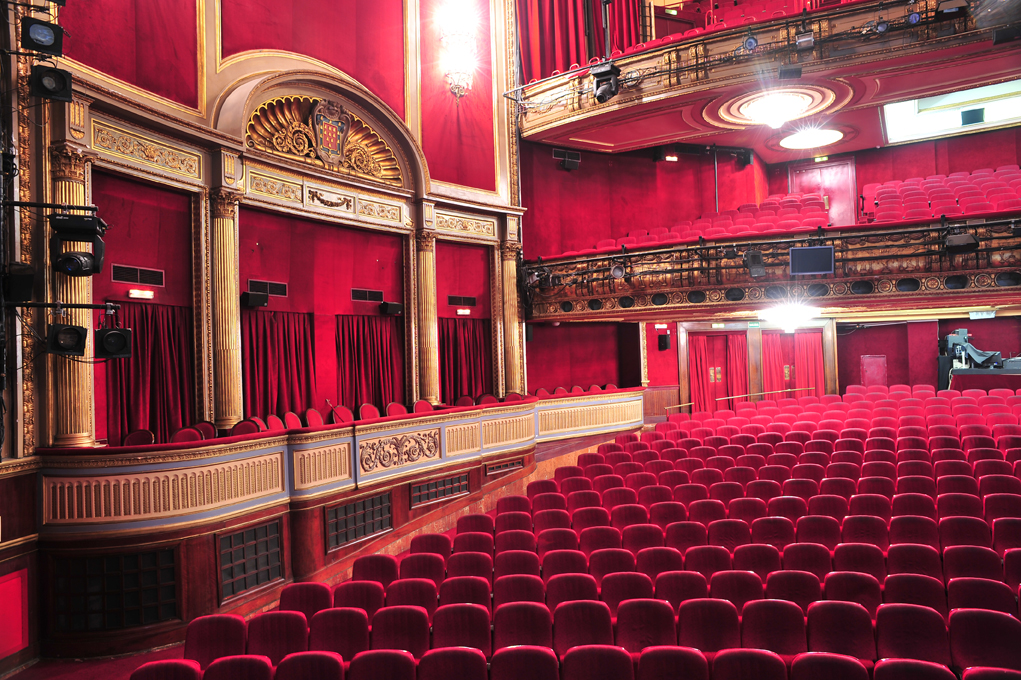
- Interior of the theatre

- Location within Madrid
- Address: Madrid; Spain
- Coordinates: 40.421865°N 3.708806°W
- Owner: Stage Entertainment

Construction
- Opened: 1950

The Lope de Vega Theatre (Teatro Lope de Vega) is a theater in Madrid, Spain.

The Lope de Vega Theatre was built between 1946 and 1947. It provided seating at the orchestra level and in two levels of balconies, with ornate decorations. It opened in August 1950, when the first live shows were performed in what became one of Madrid's showplace theatres. Popular artists including Juanita Reina opened in the theatre. In 1966 the theatre was converted to a cinema, renamed Cine Lope de Vega, with 1,557 seats. However, it continued to occasionally put on live theatrical performances and other shows. In 1987, it hosted the 1st Goya Awards, and in 1997 it hosted the Spanish Cinema Writers Circle Awards.

In 1997 the building was converted back to a showplace theatre, with 1,496 seats. The owner expanded the theatre's stagehouse into a building at the rear of the property. Shows after that date included "Man of La Mancha", "Beauty and the Beast", "The Lion King", "Phantom of the Opera", "Mama Mia!" and "Jesus Christ Superstar". The owner of the theatre is Stage Entertainment of Amsterdam.
