= 1st Goya Awards =

- Date: 17 March 1987
- Site: Teatro Lope de Vega, Madrid
- Hosted by: Fernando Rey

Highlights
- Best Film: Voyage to Nowhere
- Best Actor: Fernando Fernán Gómez; Mambru Went to War
- Best Actress: Amparo Rivelles; The House Must Be Unmade
- Most awards: Voyage to Nowhere (3)
- Most nominations: Voyage to Nowhere, Dragon Rapide and Half of Heaven (5)

Television coverage
- Network: TVE

The 1st Goya Awards ceremony, presented the Academy of Cinematographic Arts and Sciences of Spain, took place at the Teatro Lope de Vega, Madrid on 17 March 1987. The gala was hosted by Fernando Rey.

Voyage to Nowhere won the award for Best Film.

== Winners and nominees ==
The winners and nominees are listed as follows:

=== Major award nominees ===
Best Film: Voyage to Nowhere; 27 Hours; Half of Heaven	Best Director: Fernando Fernán Gómez – Voyage to Nowhere; Emilio Martínez Lázaro – Lulu by Night; Pilar Miró – Werther
Best Actor: Fernando Fernán Gómez – Mambru Went to War; Juan Diego – Dragon Rapide; Jorge Sanz – Year of Enlightment	Best Actress: Amparo Rivelles – The House Must Be Unmade; Victoria Abril – Time of Silence; Ángela Molina – Half of Heaven
Best Supporting Actor: Miguel Rellán – Dear Nanny; Antonio Banderas – Matador; Agustín González – Mambru Went to War	Best Supporting Actress: Verónica Forqué – Year of Enlightment; Chus Lampreave – Year of Enlightment; María Luisa Ponte – The Bastard Brother of God
Best Screenplay: Fernando Fernán Gómez – Voyage to Nowhere; Pedro Beltrán – Mambru Went to War; José Luis Borau – Dear Nanny	Best Spanish Language Foreign Film: A King and His Movie • Argentina; Little Revenge • Venezuela; A Time to Die • Colombia

=== Other award nominees ===
Best Cinematography: Teo Escamilla – El amor brujo; José Luis Alcaine – Half of Heaven; Hans Burmann – Werther	Best Editing: Eduardo Biurrun – The Last of Philip Banter; Pablo del Amo – Voyage to Nowhere; José Luis Matesanz – Werther
Best Sound: Werther – Bernardo Menz and Enrique Molinero; The Bastard Brother of God – Alfonso Pino and Carlos Faruolo; Moon of August – Alfonso Pino and José María Bloch	Best Original Score: Milladoiro – Half of Heaven; Xavier Montsalvatge – Dragon Rapide; Emilio Arrieta – The Disputed Vote of Mr. Cayo
Best Art Direction: Félix Murcia – Dragon Rapide; Ramiro Gómez – Black Flag; Wolfgang Burmann – Final Romanza	Best Costume Design: Gerardo Vera – El amor brujo; Elisa Ruiz and Javier Artiñano – Dragon Rapide; Gerardo Vera – Half of Heaven
Best Makeup and Hairstyles: Fernando Florido – Dragon Rapide; José Antonio Sánchez – Voyage to Nowhere

=== Honorary Goya ===
- José F. Aguayo
