= The Disputed Vote of Mr. Cayo =

- Film poster
- Spanish: El disputado voto del Sr. Cayo
- Directed by: Antonio Giménez-Rico
- Written by: Antonio Giménez-Rico; Manuel Matji
- Based on: El disputado voto del señor Cayo by Miguel Delibes
- Starring: Francisco Rabal; Juan Luis Galiardo; Iñaki Miramón; Lydia Bosch
- Cinematography: Alejandro Ulloa
- Edited by: Miguel González Sinde
- Production company: Producciones Cinematográficas Penélope
- Distributed by: Warner Española
- Release dates: 31 October 1986 (Seminci); 3 November 1986 (Spain)
- Running time: 94 minutes
- Country: Spain
- Language: Spanish

The Disputed Vote of Mr. Cayo (Spanish: El disputado voto del Sr. Cayo) is a 1986 Spanish film directed by Antonio Giménez-Rico based on the 1978 homonymous novel by Miguel Delibes. It stars Paco Rabal, Juan Luis Galiardo, Iñaki Miramón, and Lydia Bosch.

== Plot ==
The film is set in post-Francoist Spain, both in 1977 and 1986. Rafael is informed of the death of his former boss Víctor Velasco, an honest and benevolent politician. In the funeral, Rafael sees Laly, a former colleague in his political party, and they reminisce about the time they embarked on a campaign trip with Víctor to the northern outskirts of the province of Burgos to convince the local mayors of each zone for their vote. There they met Mr. Cayo, mayor of a small village and a self-sufficient farmer. Víctor never found out for whom Mr. Cayo voted and this always intrigued him. After pressure from Laly, Rafael decides to go back to the small village to find the answer. As consequence, Rafael has flashbacks of his time campaigning with Víctor in Burgos and the surrounding areas in June 1977. The 1977 election were the first democratic election of the post-Francoist era that was known as Spanish Transition. Most of the film concerns his memories during the campaign trail. It is worth noting that the scenes during the democratic years are in black and white while the scenes during the Transition are in color.

The first scenes of Burgos during the first democratic elections focus on the saturation of political propaganda in the city's infrastructure. Since Victor is running for Senator, he embarks on a campaign trip, along with Rafael and Laly to the countryside to persuade local mayors for their vote. During the trip we see the generational differences between three and their perspectives on the country and society. Victor, the older and wiser politician, has a certain appreciation for the rural side of Burgos as he believes that it is of great importance for the post-Francoist Spain. To delve into the matter, landmarks are key components during the foundation of the modern nation state. When Victor sees the Ebro River during their trip, he appreciates it as a foundational component to the nation's identity. He compares it to what the Grand Canyon was for the United States during the expansion years. However, Rafael and Laly, the two generations following Victor's, fail to see its relevance as they show disinterest to the countryside.

They arrive at a village of three people where they meet Mayor Cayo Fernández. At this point, the film valorizes the self-sufficient rural existence of Mr. Cayo in harmony with nature that is on the verge of extinction and attempts to bring the concerns of rural Spain to the political agenda of the transition. At the same time, it shows the disconnection between urban and rural society. As a result, Mr. Cayo is ironic and sardonic in his conversations with Victor, Rafael and Laly. For example, Victor introduces himself as the candidate for the poor. Mr. Cayo responds, "But I'm not poor" (Pero yo no soy pobre). In other words, Mr. Cayo has all the resources he needs to survive in his land, thus. Exchanges such as this one reflect the social differences between Mr. Cayo and the three political activists. Furthermore, Rafael's and Laly's lack of understanding of Mr. Cayos’ lifestyle magnify these social gaps. Victor, on the other hand, is able to connect and communicate with Mr. Cayo without any trouble and even admires him. Before they leave, members of the right wing party arrive to visit Mr. Cayo to persuade his vote. The young men beat up Victor after an exchange of votes and threaten Mr. Cayo for his vote. In addition, they vandalize the political propaganda put up by Rafael in the village with the phrase “Viva España”. They also put up their own posters. At the end of the film Rafael arrives at Mr. Cayo's house but the now older and fragile man is very sick and in need of help. Rafael does not know how to help, since Mr. Cayo only has herbal medicines, so instead he calls an ambulance. As Mr. Cayo is taken to the local hospital, Rafael stays in the house and sees in one of the walls a poster of Victor that he put up in the village during their trip.

== Cast ==
- Francisco Rabal as señor Cayo
- Juan Luis Galiardo as Víctor Velasco
- Iñaki Miramón as Rafa
- Lydia Bosch as Laly
- Eusebio Lázaro as Dani
- Mari Paz Molinero as mujer de Cayo
- Abel Vitón as Ángel Abad
- Gabriel Renom as Mauricio
- Francisco Casares as Carmelo
- Juan Jesús Valverde as Arturo González)

== Release ==
The film premiered on 31 October 1986 at the Valladolid International Film Festival. Distributed by Warner Española, it was released theatrically in Spain on 3 November 1986.

== See also ==
- List of Spanish films of 1986

== Bibliography ==
- Redero San Román, Manuel (2004). "El cambio político postfranquista en el cine de su tiempo: el disputado voto del señor Cayo" (PDF). In Ruzafa Ortega, Rafael (ed.). La historia a través del cine: transición y consolidación democrática en España. Servicio Editorial de la Universidad del País Vasco. pp. 23–50. ISBN 84-8373-645-4.
