= Miguel Rellán =

Spanish actor (born 1942)

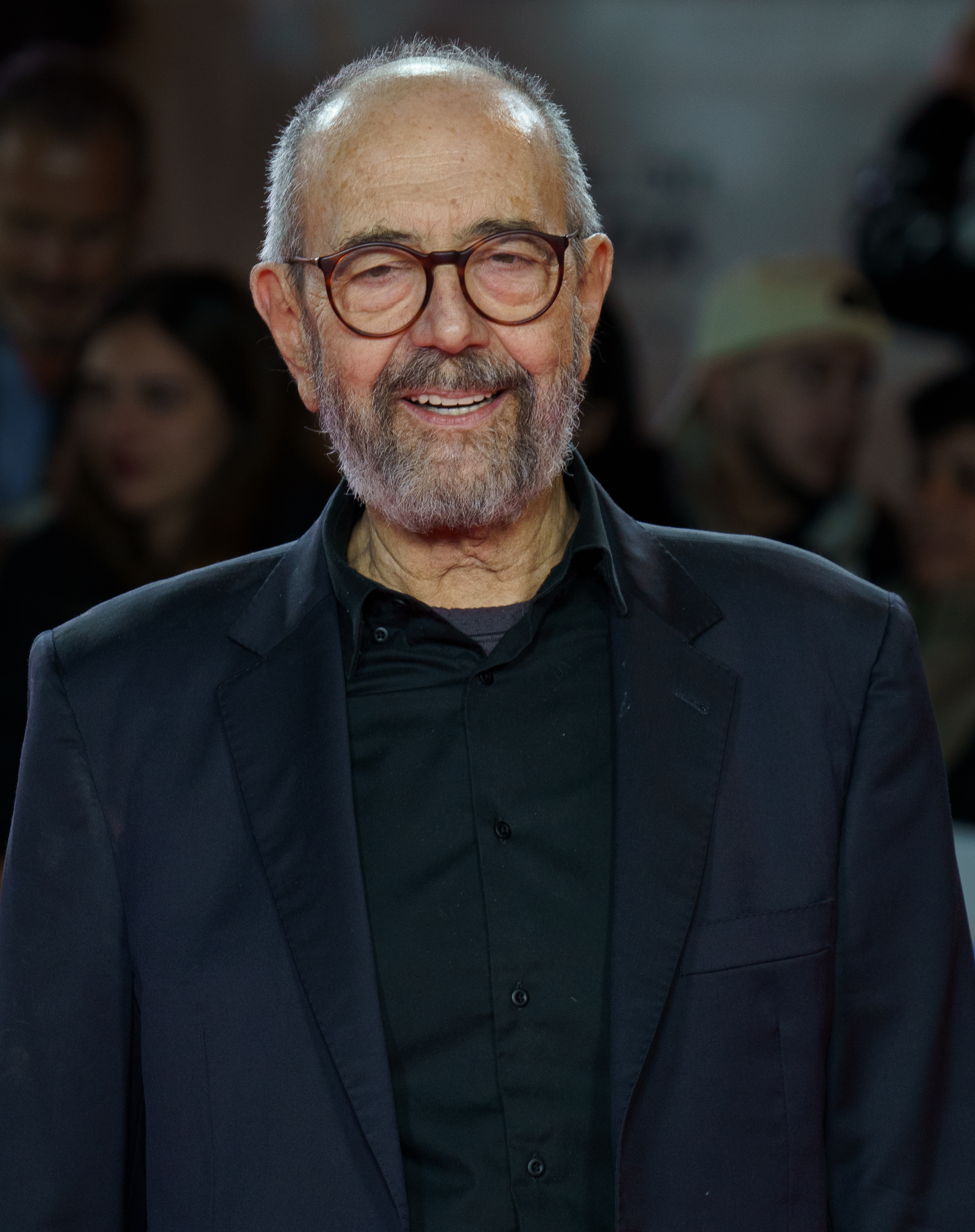
- Rellán in 2025
- Born: Miguel Ángel Rellán García; 7 November 1942 (age 83); Tétouan, Morocco
- Other names: Miguel A. Rellán; Miguel Ángel Rellán
- Occupation: Actor
- Spouse: Olvido Lorente (m. 1976–2000) Rosa María Mateo (m. 2000)

Miguel Ángel Rellán García (born 7 November 1942) is a Spanish actor.

== Life and career ==
Miguel Rellán was born on 7 November 1942 in the Moroccan city of Tétouan, then ruled as a part of the Spanish protectorate in Morocco. Rellán took his acting babysteps during his time at the University of Seville, joining the Teatro Español Universitario and founding the independent stage group Esperpento. He established in Madrid in 1974.

He made his feature film debut in El perro (1977). He was the first actor to win a Goya Award for Best Supporting Actor for Dear Nanny at the 1987 edition. He became very popular to a television audience in Spain for his portrayal of history teacher Félix in Compañeros.

== Filmography ==
=== Film ===
Year	Title	Role	Notes	Ref.
1977	El perro		Feature film debut	
1977	Mala racha			
1978	Soldados			
1981	El crack			
1981	Las aventuras de Enrique y Ana			
1981	Adulterio nacional			
1982	Asesinato en el Comité Central			
1982	Le llamaban J.R.			
1982	Femenino singular			
1983	Juego de poder			
1983	J.R. contraataca			
1983	El crack II			
1984	Las bicicletas son para el verano (Bicycles Are for the Summer)	Basilio		
1984	Dos mejor que uno			
1984	Tasio			
1984	Café, coca y puro			
1985	La vieja música			
1985	Marbella, un golpe de cinco estrellas			
1985	Sé infiel y no mires con quién			
1986	Terroristas			
1986	Tata mía (Dear Nanny)	Alberto		
1986	El viaje a ninguna parte (Voyage to Nowhere)	Dr. Arencibia		
1986	El hermano bastardo de Dios			
1987	La vida alegre	Eduardo		
1987	El bosque animado (The Enchanted Forest)	Fiz de Cotovelo		
1988	El juego más divertido (The Most Amusing Game)	Longinos Vázquez		
1988	Jarrapellejos			
1988	Pasodoble	Velázquez		
1988	Soldadito español (The Little Spanish Soldier)	Ángel		
1988	El aire de un crimen (Scent of a Crime)	Doctor Sebastián		
1989	Loco veneno			
1989	El vuelo de la paloma (The Flight of the Dove)	Miguel		
1989	Bajarse al moro (Going South Shopping)			
1989	Amanece, que no es poco (Dawn Breaks, Which Is No Small Thing)	Carmelo		
1989	Ovejas negras	Adolfo de la Cruz		
1990	¡Ay Carmela!	Teniente interrogador		
1991	El día que nací yo	Pepe Medina		
1991	Cómo ser mujer y no morir en el intento	Alfredo		
1992	El maestro de esgrima (The Fencing Master)	Cárceles		
1993	Todos a la cárcel (Everyone Off to Jail)	Perales		
1996	El perro del hortelano (The Dog in the Manger)	Fabio		
1997	Corazón loco	Mendigo ('beggar')		
2000	¡Ja me maaten...!			
2001	No te fallaré			
2002	Cuando todo esté en orden (Everything in Place)	Gerardo		
2004	Tiovivo c. 1950			
2004	El chocolate del loro			
2005	Ninette	Roque		
2007	Días de cine (Cinema Days)	José Mª Culebras		
2008	Sangre de mayo (Blood in May)	Don Mauro Requejo		
2008	Animales de compañía	Rafa		
2011	¿Estás ahí?			
2011	No lo llames amor... llámalo X			
2014	Pixel Theory		Segment "La biblioteca de Lucien"	
2015	A cambio de nada			
2016	Villaviciosa de al lado			
2017	Toc Toc			
2018	Tiempo después			
2022	Código Emperador (Code Name: Emperor)	Galán		
2023	Me he hecho viral			
2023	Matusalén (Mathusalem)			
2024	Un hipster en la España vacía (A Hipster in Rural Spain)			
2024	Menudas piezas (Checkmates)	Santiago		
2024	La casa			
2025	La buena suerte (The Good Luck)	Felipe		
2025	El cautivo (The Captive)	Antonio de Sosa		
2026	La luz (The Light)	Arzobispo Tamargo		

=== Television series ===
- Tiempos de guerra (2017) as Dámaso
- Vergüenza (2017–¿?) as Carlos
- Cuéntame cómo pasó (2016) as General (Papel episódico)
- La que se avecina (2016) as Cristóbal López García (Papel recurrente)
- Águila Roja (2015) as El emisario real
- El ministerio del tiempo (2015–2016) as Gil Pérez
- Los misterios de Laura (2011, 2014) as Isidoro de la Villa/Sebastián de la Villa
- Frágiles (2013) as Ricardo
- Fenómenos (2012) as Eugenio Nebot
- Rescatando a Sara (2011) as Ministro de exteriores
- Historias robadas (2011) as Doctor Gil
- Plaza de España (2011) as Don Benito
- Raphael: una historia de superación personal (2010) as Doctor Llano
- El comisario (2008–2009)
- Soy el solitario (2008)
- La dársena de poniente(2007) as Leopoldo
- Regreso a Moira (2006), by Mateo Gil as Vicente
- Los Serrano (2005) (Personaje episódico)
- Paco y Veva (2004) as Clemente
- Compañeros (1998–2002) as Félix Torán
- Menudo es mi padre (1996–1998) as Antonio
- La regenta (1995), by Fernando Méndez Leite as Frígilis
- El Buscavidas (1993) as Fermín
- Tango (1992) as Aledre
- Una hija más (1991) as Demetrio Sánchez
- Las gallinas de Cervantes (1988) as Cervantes
- Turno de oficio: cap 5°: "Cosecha del 73" (1986) as El Pato
- Goya (1985)
- Los desastres de la guerra (1983)
- Juanita la larga (1982) as El cura

== Theatre credits ==
- 7 años (2018), by José Cabeza
- Ninette y un señor de Murcia (2015), by Miguel Mihura
- El viaje a ninguna parte (2014), by Fernando Fernán Gómez
- Los hijos se han dormido (2012), by Daniel Veronese.
- Luces de bohemia (2012), by Valle-Inclán.
- Al final del arco iris (2011), by Peter Quilter.
- La abeja reina (2009), by Charlotte Jones.
- Marat Sade (2007), by Peter Weiss.
- Cuentos del Burdel (2005), by Miguel Hermoso.
- Los cabellos de Absalon (1983), by Pedro Calderón de la Barca.
- El gran teatro del mundo (1981), by Calderón de la Barca.
- La coartada, by Fernando Fernán Gómez.
- Amadeus, by Peter Shaffer.
- Las reclamaciones, by Valle-Inclán.
- El caballero de Olmedo, by Lope de Vega.
- La lozana andaluza, by Francisco Delicado.
- La infanta palancona, by Francisco de Quevedo.
- El alcalde de Zalamea, by Calderón de la Barca.
- Comedia veneciana de la cucaracha, by himself
- Fuenteovejuna, by Lope de Vega.
- Volpone, by Ben Jonson.
- La murga, by Alfonso Jiménez Romero.
- Soldiers, by Rolf Hochhuth.
- Novecento, by Alessandro Baricco
