= Féodor Atkine =

French actor (born 1948)

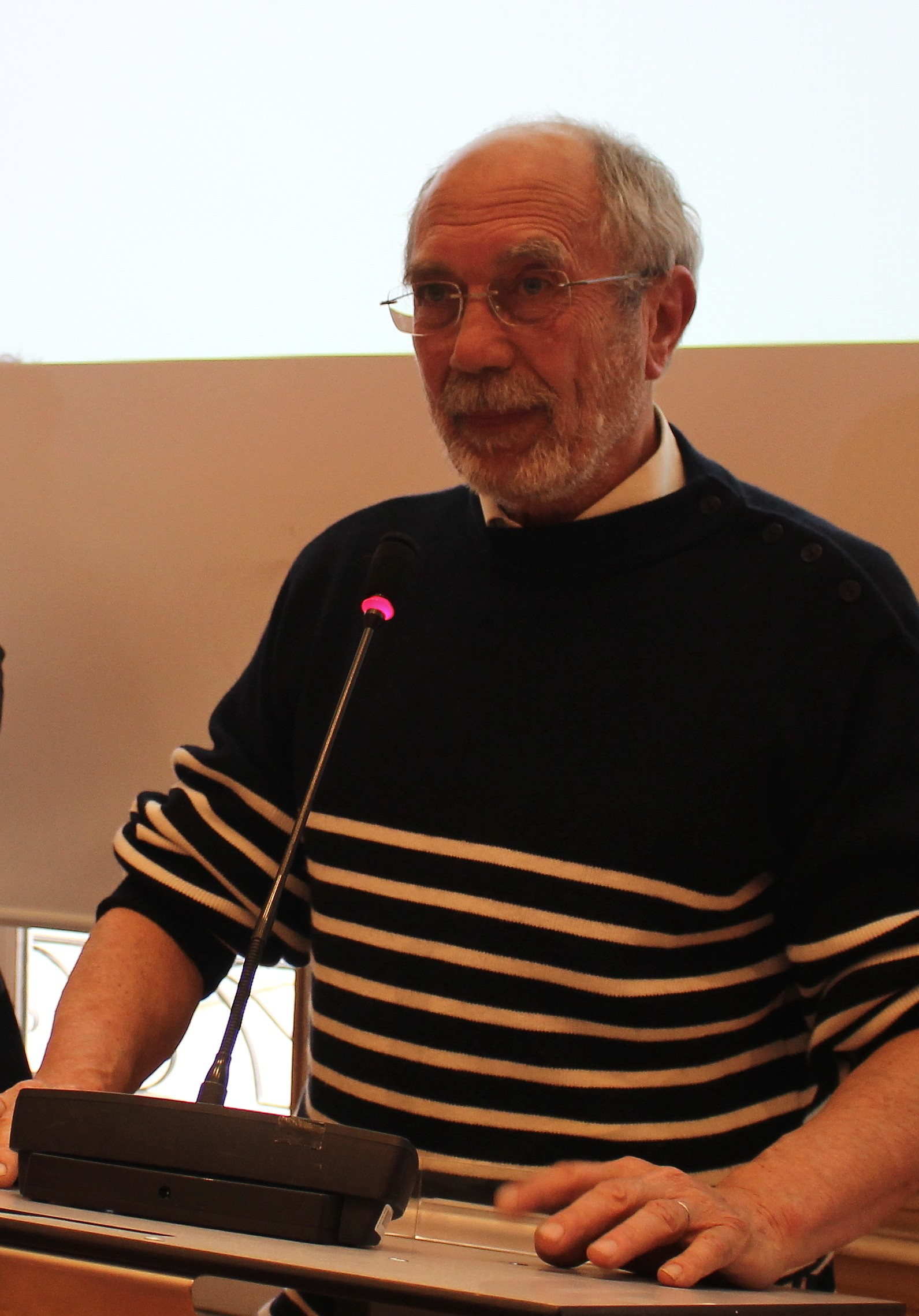
- Féodor Atkine in 2015
- Born: Thierry Théodore Armand Kaufmann; 27 February 1948 (age 78); Paris, France
- Occupation: Actor
- Years active: 1968–present
- Honours: Officier de l'ordre des Arts et des Lettres

Féodor Atkine (born Thierry Théodore Armand Kaufmann; 27 February 1948) is a French actor. He has participated in numerous plays, films and television series in France and abroad. He is also a prolific dubber. He was awarded the Ordre des Arts et des Lettres in 2019.

== Life and career ==
Féodor Atkine was born in Paris to a Russian father from Harbin, capital of Manchuria, in northeast China, whose family had fled the anti-Jewish pogroms in Poland and Ukraine to take refuge in the Far East the day before the Russo-Japanese War.

He has the distinction of participating in many productions where he speaks in French, English and/or Spanish; he has been involved in films by Woody Allen, Claude Zidi, Raoul Ruiz, Claude Lelouch, Pedro Almodóvar, Éric Rohmer, etc. He has participated in several plays as well as radio productions.

Atkine was a regular over several episodes on the 1990s British television series Sharpe, where he played the recurring character Major Pierre Ducos; the series was based on the historical novels by the author Bernard Cornwell.

Atkine is also known for dubbing in American films or television series but also for characters in Disney productions. He is (among others) the regular French voice of William Hurt, Ben Kingsley, Hugo Weaving and Hugh Laurie (which he notably dubs in the French version of House) as well as one of the recurring voices of Jonathan Banks, Frank Langella and Jeremy Irons. Since 2012, he also doubles Tommy Lee Jones, following Claude Giraud's retirement and subsequent death.

Atkine was awarded the Ordre des Arts et des Lettres in 2019.

== Selected filmography ==
Year	Title	Role	Director
1972	The Day of the Jackal	Young OAS Gunfighter (uncredited)	Fred Zinnemann
1973	'How to Do Well When You are a Jerk and a Crybaby'	A cabaret performer	Michel Audiard
1975	Love and Death	Mikhail Grushenko	Woody Allen
1977	Bobby Deerfield	Tommy	Sydney Pollack
1979	Ogro	José María Uriarte (alias Yoseba)	Gillo Pontecorvo
1979	The Police War	Serge Manékian	Robin Davis
1980	Trois hommes à abattre	Leblanc	Jacques Deray
1980	Inspector Blunder	Merlino	Claude Zidi
1981	Les Uns et les Autres	Alexis	Claude Lelouch
1981	Le Choc	Boro	Robin Davis
1982	Le Beau Mariage	Simon	Éric Rohmer
1982	Five and the Skin	Ivan	Pierre Rissient
1982	Enigma	The diplomat	Jeannot Szwarc
1983	Pauline at the Beach	Henri	Éric Rohmer
1984	Ave Maria	Adolphe Éloi	Jacques Richard
1985	Leave All Fair	André de Sarry	John Reid
1986	Lola	Mario	
1986	Sarraounia	Chanoine	Med Hondo
1986	Werther	Alberto	Pilar Miró
1988	El Dorado	Montoya	Carlos Saura
1988	Let Sleeping Cops Lie	Stoedler	José Pinheiro
1990	Angels	Hugo Carrero	Jacob Berger
1990	Vincent & Theo	Dr. Peyron	Robert Altman
1990	Henry & June	Paco Miralles, the Spanish dance instructor	Philip Kaufman
1991	High Heels	Manuel	Pedro Almodóvar
1992	Aladdin (French dubbing)	Jafar	John Musker Ron Clements
1993	Acción mutante	Kaufmann	Álex de la Iglesia
1996	Three Lives and Only One Death	André	Raoul Ruiz
1998	Ronin	Mikhi	John Frankenheimer
1998	Michael Kael vs. the World News Company	Major Sylvain	Christophe Smith
1999	Spy Games	Romanov	Ilkka Järvi-Laturi
2000	Vatel	Alcaland	Roland Joffé
2002	Semana santa	Torillo	Pepe Danquart
2002	Carnages	Paco	Delphine Gleize
2003	That Day	Warff	Raoul Ruiz
2004	Alexander	Roxane's father	Oliver Stone
2004	Hipnos (Hypnos)	Dr. Sanchez Blanc	David Carreras
2010	Small World	Scholler	Bruno Chiche
2010	Joséphine, ange gardien	Otto's voice	Jean-Marc Seban
2012	Populaire	André Japy	Régis Roinsard
2013	World War Z		Marc Forster
2013	Bright Days Ahead	Paul	
2014	In the Courtyard	Serge	Pierre Salvadori
2014	The Connection	Gaston Defferre	Cédric Jimenez
2014	Mune: Guardian of the Moon	Leeyoon	Benoît Philippon and Alexandre Heboyan
2015	The Squad	Tancrède	Benjamin Rocher
2015	Long Way North	Oloukine (voice)	Rémi Chayé
2015	This Summer Feeling	Vladimir	Mikhaël Hers
2016	Fleur de tonnerre		Stéphanie Pillonca-Kervern
2018	Return of the Hero	General Mortier-Duplessis	Laurent Tirard
2022	Blind Willow, Sleeping Woman	Mr. Suzuki (voice)	Pierre Földes
2025	Love Me Tender	Clémence's father	Anna Cazenave Cambet
