= Antonio Giménez-Rico =

Spanish film director (1938–2021)

- Born: Antonio Giménez-Rico Sáenz de Cabezón; 20 November 1938; Burgos, Spain
- Died: 12 February 2021 (aged 82); Madrid, Spain
- Occupations: Filmmaker, screenwriter

Antonio Giménez-Rico Sáenz de Cabezón (20 November 1938 – 12 February 2021) was a Spanish film director and screenwriter.

== Early life and background ==
Antonio Giménez-Rico was born in Burgos, Spain. Son to a forestry engineer, he lived in various rural areas throughout his childhood. The bucolic settings of his upbringing were a foundational piece of inspiration for his career in the movie industry. However, for a time he thought that due to his rural childhood, a career in the film industry was not feasible. Even so, he had a self-described passion for film from a young age. Prior to his start in the industry, he obtained a law degree from the University of Valladolid. He also studied journalism and piano and worked on radio. Reflecting his affinity for cinema, he directed the film club at the university of Burgos and went to write movie criticism for the magazine, Cinestudio.

== Career ==
=== 1963–1976: Early career and work on state television ===
Antonio Giménez-Rico began his career with an apprenticeship in film productions in 1963, working as an assistant director in films directed by Vittorio Cottafavi and Eugenio Martín, among others. In 1966 he made his debut as a director with the children's film, Mañana de Domingo, (Sunday Morning), which was followed by a number of comedies like El Hueso (1968) and El Cronicón (1969). The failure of ¿Es usted mi padre? (Are you my father ?) (1970), led him to find employment on television.

In 1970, Giménez-Rico began working extensively in state television for a period of years during which he directed the crime TV series Plinio (1972), about a character created by the writer Francisco García Pavón. He also directed episodes for Crónicas de un pueblo (1974–1975), Cuentos y leyendas (1974–1975), and Los libros (1974–1976) during his time with state television.

=== 1976–2008: Film breakthrough and established career ===
He returned to feature films in 1976 with Retrato de Familia (Family Portrait), an adaptation of Miguel Delibes novel, Mi idolatrado hijo Sisi (My Beloved Son Sisi), dealing with members of a provincial family during the civil war; the film is widely considered as Giménez-Rico's best work. It enabled him to make Al fin solos pero... (At last alone, but...) (1977), which critics and audiences found disappointing. The little success he achieved with his next film Del Amor y de la muerte (1977) made him come back to work on television. He later made the highly acclaimed documentary film Vestida de Azul (Dressed in Blue) (1983), which combines a series of interviews with transsexuals with dramatized fictional scenes.

Returning to television, Giménez-Rico directed the series Página de Sucesos (1985). This was followed two years later by El disputado voto del señor Cayo (The disputed Vote for Mr Cayo) (1986), which dealt with life in a Castilian village during the post Franco election of 1977, and another film adapted from a novel by Miguel Delibes. His following films failed to achieve critical or commercial success like his 1987 film Jarrapellejos, which was entered into the 38th Berlin International Film Festival.

Giménez-Rico briefly served as the President of the Academy of Motion Picture Arts and Sciences (Academia de las Artes y las Ciencias Cinematográficas) between 1988 and 1992. He also regularly appeared on the Spanish talk show ¡Que grande es el cine!. During this time, he continued to work on films. He made the anti militaristic comedy Soldadito Español (Spanish Soldier boy) (1988), which he co-scripted with Rafael Azcona, Cuatro Estaciones; (Four Seasons) (1991) and Tres Palabras (Three Words) (1993). These films failed to impress critics or audiences. In 1999 he was a member of the jury at the 21st Moscow International Film Festival.

His last project was a historical drama set in the city of Burgos during the Spanish Civil War. It's based on Óscar Esquivias' novel Inquietud en el Paraíso (2005) (Restlessness in Paradise).

==== Dressed in Blue (Vestida de azul) ====
Vestida de azul (1983) is a docu-fiction piece that was written and directed by Antonio Giménez-Rico. The film presents audiences with unprecedentedly candid access to six transsexual women who worked in the illicit sex industry during Spain's transition to democracy (some of the women also worked as strip tease performers). Importantly, this piece is distinct from Giménez-Rico's other works, which were generally drama/comedies. The piece was also one of the first films to give voice to the transgender community in Spain. Its documentary style takes particular focus on the day-to-day lives of its subjects, while also tying in commentary surrounding class dynamics, gender roles, religion and sexuality.

== Death ==
Giménez-Rico died from COVID-19 on 12 February 2021, at the age of 82.

== Filmography ==
Year	Film	Credited as			Notes	Ref.
Year	Film	Director	Producer	Writer	Notes	Ref.
1966	Mañana de Domingo	Yes	No	No		
1967	El hueso	Yes	No	Yes		
1970	El cronicón	Yes	No	Yes		
1971	¿Es usted mi padre?	Yes	No	Yes		
1972	Plinio	Yes			Spanish television, 13 episodes	
1974-1975	Crónicas de un pueblo	Yes			Spanish television, 33 episodes	
1974-1975	Cuentos y leyendas	Yes			Spanish television, 2 episodes	
1974-1976	Los libros	Yes			Spanish television, 2 episodes	
1976	Retrato de familia	Yes	No	Yes	Based on the novel Mi idolatrado hijo Sisí by Miguel Delibes	
1977	Al fin solos, pero...	Yes	No	No		
1977	Del amor y de la muerte	Yes	No	No		
1980	La balada del pequeño soñador	Yes	No	No	Short film	
1982	Rasgos	Yes			Spanish television, talk show	
1982	La máscara negra	Yes			Spanish television, 4 episodes	
1983	Dressed in Blue (Vestida de azul)	Yes	No	Yes		
1985-1986	Página de sucesos	Yes			TV series, 13 episodes	
1986	El disputado voto del Sr. Cayo	Yes	No	Yes		
1988	Jarrapellejos	Yes	No	Yes	Based on a novel by Felipe Trigo	
1988	Soldadito español	Yes	No	No		
1990	Pájaro en una tormenta	Yes	No	Yes	TV series, credited for 1 episode	
1991	Catorce estaciones	Yes	No	Yes		
1993	Tres palabras	Yes	No	Yes		
1996	Sombres y luces: Cien años de cine español	Yes	No	Yes	Documentary	
1997	Las ratas	Yes	No	Yes	Based on a novel by Miguel Delibes	
2002	Primer y último amor	Yes	No	Yes	Based on a novel by Torcuato Luca de Tena	
2003	Hotel Danubio	Yes	No	Yes	Remake of Los peces rojos, by José Antonio Nieves Conde, 1955	
2005	Castilla y León, Patrimonio de la Humanidad	Yes	No	No	Documentary	
2008	El libro de las aguas	Yes	No	Yes	Based on a novel by Alejandro López Andrada	

== Bibliography ==
- D'Lugo, Marvin: Guide to the Cinema of Spain, Greenwood Press, 1997. ISBN 0-313-29474-7
- Torres, Augusto, Diccionario del cine Espanol, Espasa-Calpe, 1996, ISBN 84-239-9241-1
