= Werther (1986 film) =

- Directed by: Pilar Miró
- Written by: Mario Camus; Pilar Miró
- Produced by: César Benítez; Pilar Miró
- Starring: Eusebio Poncela
- Cinematography: Hans Burmann
- Release date: 1986
- Country: Spain
- Language: Spanish

Werther is a 1986 Spanish drama film directed and co-written by Pilar Miró and starring Eusebio Poncela. It is a modern adaptation of Johann Wolfgang von Goethe's 1774 novel The Sorrows of Young Werther. The film was entered into the main competition at the 43rd edition of the Venice Film Festival. It also won the award for best sound at the first edition of the Goya Awards.

== Synopsis ==
In a coastal town in northern Spain, a young Greek teacher, Werther, lives alone in his ancestors' old house on the other side of the bay. He is a romantic and melancholic man who agrees to tutor the son of a wealthy shipowner, who happens to be an introverted and difficult child. Werther becomes attracted to Carlota, the boy's mother, who is a strong and independent woman, and will no longer be able to live without her.

== Cast ==
- Eusebio Poncela as Werther
- Mercedes Sampietro as Carlota
- Féodor Atkine as Alberto
- Emilio Gutiérrez Caba as Federico
- Vicky Peña as Beatriz
- Reinhard Kolldehoff
