= Romanza final =

Romanza final is a 1986 biographic film about opera singer Julián Gayarre. It was directed by José María Forqué.

== Cast ==
- José Carreras – Julián Gayarre
- Sydne Rome – Alicia
- Antonio Ferrandis
- Susana Campos
- Montserrat Caballé
- Aitana Sánchez-Gijón

== Awards ==
This film was nominated for Best Art Direction at the 1st Goya Awards in 1987.
