= Lydia Bosch =

Spanish actress and presenter

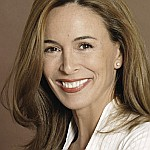
- Born: Lydia Boquera de Buen; 26 November 1963 (age 61); Barcelona, Spain
- Years active: 1985–present

Lydia Boquera de Buen (born 26 November 1963 in Barcelona) known professionally as Lydia Bosch is a Spanish actress and television presenter. She has appeared in more than thirty films since 1985.

== Selected filmography ==
=== Films ===
Year	Title	Role	Notes
1986	The Disputed Vote of Mr. Cayo	Laly	
1988	Jarrapellejos	Ernesta	
2000	You're the One	Julia	

=== Television ===
Year	Title	Role	Notes
1984-1986	Un, dos, tres... responda otra vez	Herself	Accountant secretary
1990	La forja de un rebelde	Aurelia	
1993	Lleno Por Favor	Trini	
1993-1994	El Gran Juego de la Oca	Herself	Hostess
1995-1999	Médico de familia	Alicia Soller Moreno	
2005	Motivos personales	Natalia Nadal	
2013	Gran Hotel	Violeta Salinas	
2014-2015	Sin identidad	Luisa Vergel de Fuentes	
2018	La verdad	Natalia McMahon	
2018-2019	Paquita Salas	Alicia Soller / Vito	
2021	Servir y proteger	Mabel Cervera	
2022-2023	Tu cara me suena	Herself	Contestant
2023	Mía es la venganza	Sonia Hidalgo	
2024	El gran premio de la cocina	Herself	Hostess
