= List of Spanish films of 1985 =

A list of Spanish-produced and co-produced feature films released in Spain in 1985.

== Films ==
Release		Title (Domestic title)	Cast & Crew	Ref.
F E B R U A R Y	13	Berta's Motives (Los motivos de Berta)	Director: José Luis Guerín Cast: Silvia Gracia, Arielle Dombasle, Iñaki Aierra, Rafael Díaz	
F E B R U A R Y	14	Crimen en familia	Director: Santiago San Miguel Cast: Charo López, Agustín González, Cristina Marsillach	
M A R C H	4	Stico	Director: Jaime de Armiñán Cast: Fernando Fernán Gómez, Agustín González, Carmen Elías, Amparo Baró, Manuel Zarzo	
M A R C H	8	The Heifer (La vaquilla)	Director: Luis García Berlanga Cast: Alfredo Landa, Guillermo Montesinos, Santiago Ramos, José Sacristán, Agustín González, Adolfo Marsillach, Amparo Soler Leal, María Luisa Ponte, Juanjo Puigcorbé, Antonio Gamero	
M A R C H	15	Eternal Fire (Fuego eterno)	Director: José Ángel Rebolledo Cast: Imanol Arias, Ángela Molina	
M A R C H	15	Perras callejeras	Director: José Antonio de la Loma Cast: Sonia Martínez, Teresa Giménez, Susana Sentís, Gabriel Renom	
A P R I L	22	Padre nuestro	Director: Francisco Regueiro Cast: Fernando Rey, Francisco Rabal, Victoria Abril	
S E P T E M B E R	17	Requiem for a Spanish Peasant (Réquiem por un campesino español)	Directo: Francesc Betriu Cast: Antonio Banderas, Fernando Fernán Gómez, Terele Pávez	
S E P T E M B E R	26	The Court of the Pharaoh (La corte de Faraón)	Director: José Luis García Sánchez Cast: Ana Belén, Antonio Banderas, Fernando Fernán Gómez, Juan Diego	
S E P T E M B E R	27	Outside the Walls (Extramuros)	Director: Miguel Picazo Cast: Carmen Maura, Mercedes Sampietro, Assumpta Serna, Aurora Bautista, Antonio Ferrandis	
O C T O B E R	17	The Lost Paradise (Los paraísos perdidos)	Director: Basilio Martín Patino Cast: Charo López, Alfredo Landa, Juan Diego, Miguel Narros, Ana Torrent, Paco Rabal	
N O V E M B E R	8	Yo, el Vaquilla	Director: José Antonio de la Loma Cast: Juan José Moreno Cuenca "El Vaquilla", Raúl García Losada, Teresa Giménez, Carmen de Lirio, Frank Braña	
D E C E M B E R	5	Be Wanton and Tread No Shame (Sé infiel y no mires con quién)	Director: Fernando Trueba Cast: Ana Belén, Carmen Maura, Antonio Resines, Verónica Forqué, Santiago Ramos, Guillermo Montesinos, Chus Lampreave	
D E C E M B E R	20	The Knight of the Dragon (El caballero del dragón)	Director: Fernando Colomo Cast: Klaus Kinski, Harvey Keitel, Fernando Rey, Miguel Bosé	
