= Pasodoble (film) =

- Theatrical release poster
- Directed by: José Luis García Sánchez
- Screenplay by: Rafael Azcona; José Luis García Sánchez
- Produced by: Hervé Hachuel
- Starring: Fernando Rey; Juan Diego; Antonio Resines; Cassen; Mari Carmen Ramírez; Kiti Mánver; Eva León; Miguel Rellán; Antonio Gamero; Luis Ciges; Pedro Reyes; Caroline Grimm; María Galiana; Manuel Caro; Juan Luis Galiardo; Antoñita Colomé
- Cinematography: Fernando Arribas
- Edited by: Pablo G. del Amo
- Music by: Carmelo Bernaola
- Production company: Tesauro
- Distributed by: Iberoamericana Distribución
- Release date: 9 June 1988
- Country: Spain
- Language: Spanish

Pasodoble is a 1988 Spanish comedy film directed by José Luis García Sánchez and co-written by Rafael Azcona. Its ensemble cast features Fernando Rey, Juan Diego, Antonio Resines, Cassen, Mari Carmen Ramírez, Kiti Mánver, Eva León, Miguel Rellán, Antonio Gamero, Luis Ciges, Pedro Reyes, Caroline Grimm, María Galiana, Manuel Caro, Juan Luis Galiardo, and Antoñita Colomé.

== Plot ==
Makren, claiming to be the natural daughter of the aristocrat Don Nuño and a Swiss nurse, makes it to Córdoba looking for her biological father, coming across her purported half brother Juan Luis, a social parasite and Andalusian señorito, and the Pizarreros, a Romani family squatting the 'Museo Legado Pontirole'.

== Cast ==
- Fernando Rey as Don Nuño de Riomayor
- Caroline Grimm as Makren
- Juan Diego as Juan Luis
- Antonio Resines as Topero
- Cassen as Acacio
- Mari Carmen Ramírez as Carmen
- Kiti Manver as Camila
- Eva León
- Miguel Rellán as Velázquez
- Antonio Gamero as poli
- Luis Ciges
- Pedro Reyes
- María Galiana
- Manuel Caro
- Juan Luis Galiardo
- Antoñita Colomé as María

== Production ==
García Sánchez billed his work as "baroque, realistic, bitter, and amusing". The film was shot in Córdoba and Madrid. A Tesauro production, it had a budget of 150 million ₧. The Palace of Viana stood in for the Museo Legado Pontirole.

== Release ==
The film premiered on 9 June 1988.

== Reception ==
Ángel Fernández-Santos of El País described Pasodoble as "an almost unsustainable choral work which García Sanchez sustains with disarming ease".

== Accolades ==
Year	Award	Category	Nominee(s)	Result	Ref.
1989	3rd Goya Awards	Best Original Screenplay	Rafael Azcona, José Luis García Sánchez	Nominated	
1989	3rd Goya Awards	Best Original Score	Carmelo Bernaola	Won	
1989	3rd Goya Awards	Best Production Supervision	Marisol Carnicero	Nominated	
1989	3rd Goya Awards	Best Sound	Daniel Goldstein, Ricardo Steinberg	Nominated	

== See also ==
- List of Spanish films of 1988
