= Requiem for a Spanish Peasant (film) =

- Theatrical release poster
- Spanish: Réquiem por un campesino español
- Directed by: Francesc Betriu
- Screenplay by: Raúl Artigot; Gustau Hernández; Francec Betriu
- Based on: Requiem for a Spanish Peasant by Ramon J. Sender
- Produced by: Ángel Huete
- Starring: Antonio Ferrandis; Antonio Banderas; Fernando F. Gómez; Terele Pávez; Simon Andreu; Emilio G. Caba; Francisco Algora; María Luisa San José; Eduardo Calvo; Antonio Iranzo; Alberto Rincón; Ana Gracia; Conrado San Martín; José Antonio Labordeta
- Cinematography: Raúl Artigot
- Edited by: Guillermo S. Maldonado
- Music by: Antón García Abril
- Production companies: Nemo Films; Venus Producción
- Distributed by: Lauren Films
- Release dates: 29 August 1985 (Venice); 15 September 1985 (Spain)
- Country: Spain
- Language: Spanish

Requiem for a Spanish Peasant (Spanish: Réquiem por un campesino español) is a 1985 Spanish historical drama film directed by Francesc Betriu based on the 1953 short novel of the same name by Ramon J. Sender. Its cast features Antonio Ferrandis and Antonio Banderas.

== Plot ==
Told from the account of priest Mosén Millán, conducting a requiem mass, the plot tracks the life of Republican peasant Paco, killed by Fascists during the Spanish Civil War.

== Cast ==
- Antonio Ferrandis as mosén Millán
- Antonio Banderas as Paco, el del Molino
- Fernando Fernán Gómez as don Valeriano
- Terele Pávez as la Jerónima
- Simón Andreu as don Cástulo
- Emilio Gutiérrez Caba
- Francisco Algora
- Eduardo Calvo as don Gumersindo
- María Luisa San José
- Antonio Iranzo
- Alberto Rincón
- Ana Gracia as Águeda
- Conrado San Martín
- José Antonio Labordeta as pregonero ('town crier')
- María Isbert
- Tony Fuentes
- Manolo Zarzo
- Juan Torres
- Elisenda Ribas
- Pilar Delgado
- José María Resel
- Rafael Izuzquiza
- Yelena Samarina
- María Álvarez

== Production ==
The film is a Venus and Nemo Films production, and it had support from Catalan broadcaster TV3. Shooting locations in the province of Zaragoza included Embid (Calatayud), Chodes, and Arándiga.

== Release ==
There was controversy over the film title, with National Cinematography Institute director Pilar Miró threatening to remove State backing for the Venice premiere should the español ('Spanish') bit be removed from the title, as TV3 managers suggested at some point. The film premiered at the 42nd Venice International Film Festival in August 1985. Distributed by Lauren Films, it was released theatrically in Spain on 17 September 1985.

== See also ==
- List of Spanish films of 1985
