= Caso cerrado (film) =

- Directed by: Juan Caño Arecha
- Screenplay by: Juan Caño Arecha, Gonzalo Goicoechea
- Cinematography: Alfredo Mayo
- Edited by: Julio Peña
- Music by: Luis Mendo, Bernardo Feverrigel
- Production companies: Tango Films, S. A.
- Release date: 1985
- Running time: 115 min
- Country: Spanish
- Language: Spanish

Caso cerrado (lit. 'Case closed') is a 1985 Spanish film starring Pepa Flores (Marisol) and Patxi Bisquert.

The film was directed by Juan Caño Arecha and written by him and Gonzalo Goicoechea.

The film became Marisol's last. According to some, it was its flop that led to her definitive retirement, after Carlos Saura succeeded to bring her back for Blood Wedding and Carmen.

== Plot ==
The Jewish wedding ceremony between César and Isabel takes place in Madrid. Non-conformist César sees his life upturned as he campaigns against compulsory military service. He temporarily flees to Paris, is charged with scam charges by the bank he works for, ends up in jail, and commits suicide.

== Reception ==
The film was both a commercial and critical flop. It became Marisol's last film, as she retired from the cinema. Caso cerrado was advertised as her comeback feature, but after its failure she had to play "cat-and-mouse" with the media in San Sebastián where she stayed for three days.

According to Nuria Triana-Toribio and her book Spanish National Cinerma, the film flopped because it "did not find an audience among non-politicized younger spectators, the audience that patronized cinema most frequently in the 1980s and that was seeking [purely] entertainment."

José Manuel Caballero Bonald called the film "noble but disappointing".

== Cast ==
- Pepa Flores as Isabel
- Patxi Bisquert as César
- Encarna Paso as César's mother
- Isabel Mestres as Teresa
- Santiago Ramos as Javier

...

- Fernando Delgado
- Antonio Banderas as Gasofa
- Nacho Martínez

== Awards ==
In 1986, Antonio Banderas was awarded his first Fotogramas de Plata for his work in this as well as two other 1985 films: La corte de Faraón (directed by José Luis García Sánchez) and Réquiem por un campesino español (directed by Francesc Betriú).

Year	Award	Category	Nominee	Work	Result	Ref.
1986	Fotogramas de Plata	Best Film Actor	Antonio Banderas	Réquiem por un campesino español, La corte de Faraón, Caso cerrado	Won	
