= Escenas de Matrimonio =

Television series broadcast by Telecinco

Escenas de Matrimonio was a series telecast by the Spanish television network, Telecinco, produced by Alba Adriatica. It premiered on 1 August 2007, featuring the lives of various couples who live in the same building dealing with similar problems in their daily lives.

== Predecessors ==
=== TVE (2002–2004) ===
The idea of the show actually began in 2002 as a number of separate sketches on La 1's Noche de Fiesta, led by José Luis Moreno. His nephews Alberto and Laura Caballero were responsible for directing and scripting this mini-comedy, which soon became one of the most popular sketches on the show.

In this first incarnation, the actors who gave life to the characters were Marisa Porcel (Pepa), Pepe Ruiz (Avelino) Silvia Gambino (Marina) and Alfredo Cernuda (Roberto). The characters of the young couple were less defined and did not even have names at this stage, and were interpreted by Manuel Belmonte and Ruth Arteaga. In the upcoming seasons they were replaced by Rosana Manso and Javier Coromina, and occasionally Martin Czehmester.

=== Antena 3 (2004) ===
Once Noche de Fiesta ended in June 2004, some of the cast played the same characters in Antena 3's La sopa boba, which was broadcast until the end of 2004. The roles were played by Marisa Porcel (Pepa), Pepe Ruiz (Avelino) Silvia Gambino (Marina) and Alfredo Cernuda (Roberto).

=== Theater (2003–2006) ===
Given the great success of the idea, the sketch took the stage, and between 2003 and 2006, tours were conducted throughout Spain, under the title Matrimoniadas: Hasta que la muerte los separe. In 2005 and 2006, the role of Roberto was played by Santiago Urrialde and the young couple was played by Paloma Figueroa and Mario Barbero along with Pepe Ruiz, Marisa Porcel and Silvia Gambino in the roles of Avelino, Pepa and Marina respectively.

Finally the show reached the Teatro La Latina in Madrid, and played between April and November 2005 with the following cast: Marisa Porcel Pepe Ruiz, Silvia Gambino, Alfredo Cernuda, Rosana Manso and Martin Czehmester.

== Telecinco: Escenas de Matrimonio (2007–2011) ==
=== Beginnings ===
On 1 August 2007 the original idea was revived on Telecinco as the series Escenas de Matrimonio, enjoying great success and following the same pattern of independent sketches, but with the inclusion of fresh cast members such as David Venancio Muro in the role of Roberto, Soledad Mallol as Marina as a middle-aged couple and Miren Ibarguren st Sonia and Daniel Muriel as Miguel, a young couple.

Besides the main characters, this series also features Ramon (Ruben Sanz) the attractive best friend Miguel (Daniel Muriel), who Sonia (Miren Ibarguren) cannot stand, Berta (Marta Poveda), the best friend of Sonia (Miren Ibarguren), a married woman with children who goes from one man to another, including Ramon (Ruben Sanz), Paco (Jesus Caba), the building's doorman. They were joined by Desislava (Emilia Uutinen), the beautiful assistant of Pepa (Marisa Porcel) and Avelino (Pepe Ruiz).

There were also occasional characters like Laura (Rosa Clara Garcia), Marina's best friend, married herself with one child, and a frequent source of advice on marriage. Cayetana (Carmen Esteban), Pepa's best friend (Marisa Porcel), who loves to tease her friend and Domingo (Ibon Uzkudun), Sonia's ex, a constant source of trouble to the young couple.

=== Pepa and Avelino go, Paca and Natalio join ===
At the end of 2007 Pepe Ruiz (Avelino) and Marisa Porcel (Pepa) left Escenas de Matrimonio at the height of its success, and signed for Antena 3. The two immediately went to work on La Familia Mata.

Their characters were replaced, by Manuel Galiana and Mary Carmen Ramirez, as Natalio and Paca respectively.

=== A new couple, Cesareo and Brígida ===
At the end of February 2008, another couple, Cesareo and Brigida, joined the show, played by Cesareo Estebanez and Mamen Garcia. The couple, playing Paco's retired uncle and aunt, introduced the audience to new parts of the buildings – such as the door way or Paco's house, where they are staying.

In the new season, Brigida (Mamen Garcia) and Cesareo (Cesareo Estebanez) have changed after winning the lottery and buy another apartment in the building. Both hire Desislava (Emilia Uutinen) as an assistant after abandoning Paca (Mary Carmen Ramirez) and Natalio (Manuel Galiana).

Also Sigur (Martin Czehmesther), the boyfriend Desislava (Emilia Uutinen) to be mad at all women in the building.

In the new season following the abandonment of Paca (Mary Carmen Ramirez) and Natalio (Manuel Galiana), Cayetana (Carmen Esteban), the best friend of Pepa (Marisa Porcel) and then Paca (Mary Carmen Ramirez), will become the best friend Brigida (Mamen Garcia) where they share many scenes with her.

=== New partner, Ricardo and Eufemia, which could already see in the series ===
In July 2008, began broadcasting scenes of Eufemia (Marta Puig) and Ricardo (Juan Jesus Valverde), Miguel's mother (Daniel Muriel) and Sonia's father (Miren Ibarguren), respectively, which could already be seen in the series, but with Miguel (Daniel Muriel) and Sonia (Miren Ibarguren).

But it was only at the end of the first season since beginning the second season, as before leaving again, sharing some scenes with Miguel (Daniel Muriel) Ainhoa and (Mar Saura). Although occasionally leave them with two scenes alone.

=== Abandonment Natalio and Paca ===
Mary Carmen Ramirez (Paca) and Manuel Galiana (Natalio) have abandoned the series because it split up and the floor where they lived, but Emilia Uutinen (Desislava), assistance Paca (Mary Carmen Ramirez) and Natalio (Manuel Galiana) is still in the series despite the abandonment of these, now as assistant Brigida (Mamen Garcia) and Cesareo (Cesareo Estebanez) after moving to another floor.

It also incorporates Martin Czehmester as Sigur, the boyfriend Desislava (Emilia Uutinen), of which he saw in some chapters of the first season, but now sharing scenes with Brigida (Mamen Garcia) and Cesareo (Cesareo Estebanez).

Cayetana (Carmen Esteban), the best friend of Paca (Mary Carmen Ramirez), will become the best friend Brigida (Mamen Garcia) following the abandonment of Paca (Mary Carmen Ramirez) and Natalio (Manuel Galiana).

=== Abandonment and Ramon Sonia and incorporating Ainhoa ===
Miren Ibarguren (Sonia) following sign for Aída leaves the series, which will leave your kid by Ramon (Rubén Sanz) is also up in the series.

Replacing Sonia (Miren Ibarguren) has been Ainhoa (Mar Saura) a divorced lawyer who will be the new partner Miguel (Daniel Muriel). Although initially only companions were flat gradually love.

Also in place of Ramon (Rubén Sanz) Nico (Antonio Moreno) has joined, Ramon's cousin (Rubén Sanz), now Miguel (Daniel Muriel) is the best friend, but with a smaller role than that of Ramon (Rubén Sanz).

Domingo (Ibon Uzkudun), the former Sonia (Miren Ibarguren) also disappears from the series by abandoning it.

=== Incorporating Asun and Emilio ===
Also includes a new marriage, Silvia Gambino and Santiago Urrialde as Asun and Emilio, a middle-aged marriage that are not supported each other.

Her mother, Florinda, played by Lina Morgan will be very top of them, being anxious to get divorced because they do not support Emilio (Santiago Urrialde). At three weeks of its introduction, Lina Morgan (Florinda) left the series for health reasons.

Weeks later he announced the incorporation of Empar Ferrer as Lupe, the millionaire aunt Asun (Silvia Gambino), which also supports Emilio (Santiago Urrialde).

== Characters ==
=== Actors ===
- Ainhoa (Mar Saura)
- Miguel (Daniel Muriel)
- Roberto (David Venancio Muro)
- Marina (Soledad Mallol)
- Emilio (Santiago Urrialde)
- Asun (Silvia Gambino)
- Berta (Marta Poveda)
- Sigur (Martin Czehmester)
- Brigida (Mamen Garcia)
- Cesareo (Cesareo Estebanez)
- Desislava (Emilia Uutinen)
- Paco (Jesus Caba)

=== Minor ===
- Eufemia (Marta Puig)
- Ricardo (Juan Jesus Valverde)

=== Episodic characters ===
- Nico (Antonio Moreno)
- Lupe (Empar Ferrer)
- Laura (Rosa Clara Garcia)
- Cayetana (Carmen Esteban)

=== Past characters ===
- Sonia (Miren Ibarguren)
- Avelino (Pepe Ruiz)
- Pepa (Marisa Porcel)
- Natalio (Manuel Galiana)
- Paca (Mary Carmen Ramirez)
- Ramon (Ruben Sanz)
- Florinda (Lina Morgan)
- Domingo (Ibon Uzkudun)

== Adaptations ==
Escenas de Matrimonio was adapted in Greek television and has been broadcast between 2013 and 2024 on Alpha TV, making it the longest-running Greek sitcom. It was also adapted in Uruguay under the name Hogar, dulce hogar in 2009.
