= Wolves' Moon =

- Theatrical release poster
- Spanish: Luna de lobos
- Directed by: Julio Sánchez Valdés
- Screenplay by: Julio Llamazares; Julio Sánchez Valdés
- Based on: Luna de lobos by Julio Llamazares
- Produced by: José Luis Olaizola M.
- Starring: Santiago Ramos; Antonio Resines; Álvaro de Luna; Kiti Mánver; Fernando Vivanco
- Cinematography: Juan Molina
- Edited by: Teresa Font
- Music by: Luis Mendo; Bernardo Fuster
- Production companies: Brezal PC; Julio Sánchez Valdés PC
- Distributed by: United International Pictures
- Release date: 29 May 1987
- Country: Spain
- Language: Spanish

Wolves' Moon (Spanish: Luna de lobos) is a 1987 Spanish historical drama film directed by Julio Sánchez Valdés based on the novel of the same name by Julio Llamazares which stars Santiago Ramos, Antonio Resines, and Álvaro de Luna.

== Plot ==
The plot takes place between 1937 and 1946. It tracks the dwindling fortunes of a group of Republican soldiers who retreat to the mountains between Asturias and León in northern Spain after the fall of the Front of Asturias to the Francoist faction, surviving as Maquis guerrilla fighters in the wilderness. Hunted and cornered by the Civil Guard like if they were wild animals, an escape to France is their only hope.

== Cast ==
- Santiago Ramos as Ramiro
- Antonio Resines as Ángel
- Álvaro de Luna as Gildo
- Kiti Mánver as María
- Fernando Vivanco

== Production ==
The film is based on the 1985 novel Luna de lobos by Julio Llamazares. It is a Brezal PC and Julio Sánchez Valdés PC production. Shooting locations included the comarca of Riaño, in the province of León.

== Release ==
Distributed by United International Pictures (UIP), the film was released theatrically in Spain on 29 May 1987.

== See also ==
- List of Spanish films of 1987
