= Santiago Ramos =

Santiago Ramos may refer to:

- Santiago Ramos (actor) (born 1949), Spanish actor
- Santiago Ramos (racing driver) (born 2004), Mexican racing driver
