= Case Closed (disambiguation) =

Case Closed is a Japanese comic and media franchise created by Gosho Aoyama.

Case Closed may also refer to:

- Case Closed (TV series), a TV series based on the manga
- Case Closed (film), a 1988 TV film directed by Dick Lowry
- Case Closed, a 1993 book by Gerald Posner about the assassination of John F. Kennedy
- "Case Closed", a 1995 episode of Walker, Texas Ranger
- "Case Closed", a 2012 song by Little Mix song from DNA
- "Case Closed", a 2015 episode of Bad Judge
- Caso cerrado (film), a 1985 Spanish film starring Pepa Flores (Marisol)
- Caso Cerrado, a Spanish-language court show broadcast by Telemundo
