= Maria Lamor =

Spanish actress

Maria Lamor is a Spanish actress, known for roles in Star Knight (1985), Orquesta Club Virginia (1992) and the TV series Brigada central (1989).
