= Outside the Wall =

Outside the Wall can refer to:

- Outside the Wall (film), a 1950 film noir crime drama
- "Outside the Wall" (song), a 1979 song by Pink Floyd
- Outside the Walls, a 1985 Spanish drama film
