= The Heifer =

La vaquilla
- Directed by: Luis García Berlanga
- Written by: Rafael Azcona; Luis García Berlanga
- Produced by: Alfredo Matas
- Starring: Alfredo Landa; José Sacristán; Adolfo Marsillach; Santiago Ramos; Guillermo Montesinos; Amparo Soler Leal
- Cinematography: Carlos Suárez
- Edited by: José Luis Matesanz
- Music by: Miguel Asins Arbó
- Release date: 6 March 1985
- Running time: 122 minutes
- Country: Spain
- Language: Spanish
- Box office: 527,303,939 pesetas

La vaquilla (English: The Heifer) is a 1985 Spanish comedy film written and directed by Luis García Berlanga. It was the first comedy made about the Spanish Civil War and the highest-grossing Spanish film in Spain at the time surpassing Los santos inocentes.

== Plot ==
During the Spanish Civil War on the Aragón frontline the speakers of the Nationalist troops announce a festival in a nearby village which includes a bull run and religious procession. A group of Republican soldiers infiltrate the Nationalist side to steal the animal for two reasons; to ruin the holiday for the Nationalists and because their food stores are low.

== Characters ==
- Brigada Castro (Alfredo Landa), a professional Republican soldier.
- Mariano (Guillermo Montesinos), a Republican soldier coming from a village across the frontline, where his girlfriend Guadalupe remained.
- Limeño (Santiago Ramos), a Republican soldier who was a bullfighter before the war. Chosen to kill the heifer, he is actually afraid of bulls.
- Lieutenant Broseta (José Sacristán), a Republican officer who was a hairdresser before the war. He longs for his profession and threatens to punish failure with a complete head shave.
- Priest (Carles Velat), a Republican soldier who almost became a Catholic priest. He still remembers many mannerisms.
- Republican Colonel (Eduardo Calvo)
- Guadalupe (Violeta Cela), daughter of a Republican and girlfriend of the absent Republican Mariano, she is dating a nationalist Alférez.
- Nationalist Commander (Agustín González), has to deal with his troops and the local aristocrats.
- Juana (María Luisa Ponte), mother of Guadalupe, has to hide her Republican husband.
- Alférez (Juanjo Puigcorbé), a Nationalist officer courting Guadalupe.
- The marquis (Adolfo Marsillach) is the local aristocrat. He tries to convince the commander to push the front so that all his enormous estate (currently divided by the frontline), falls in the Nationalist side. His "inherited" gout forbids him to walk.

== Filming ==
The film was shot, for the most part, in Sos del Rey Católico (Zaragoza), with a large portion of the local population participating as extras. At the time, the filming was a major event for the town, which threw itself wholeheartedly into the occasion. However, tensions arose between the actors and Berlanga during production due to his use of long takes; Alfredo Landa famously recounted having to climb a local hill 41 times to get a single scene right. In 2009, the town hosted a celebration marking the 25th anniversary of the film's production; many of the cast members were in attendance and were honored with a monument dedicated to them. Some of the extras were also interviewed in the television special on TVE Versión Española that also interviewed the film's actors José Sacristán, Santiago Ramos and Guillermo Montesinos on the 25th anniversary of La vaquilla's release.

The Republican camp scenes were filmed in the abandoned village of Ruesta.

Ultimately, the production proved to be a challenging undertaking, boasting a budget of 250 million pesetas (1.5 million euros) and involving some 500 extras. This made it the most expensive film in the history of Spanish cinema—a record that would be surpassed just one year later by Fernando Colomo's El caballero del dragón, with a budget of 300 million pesetas.

== Image gallery ==
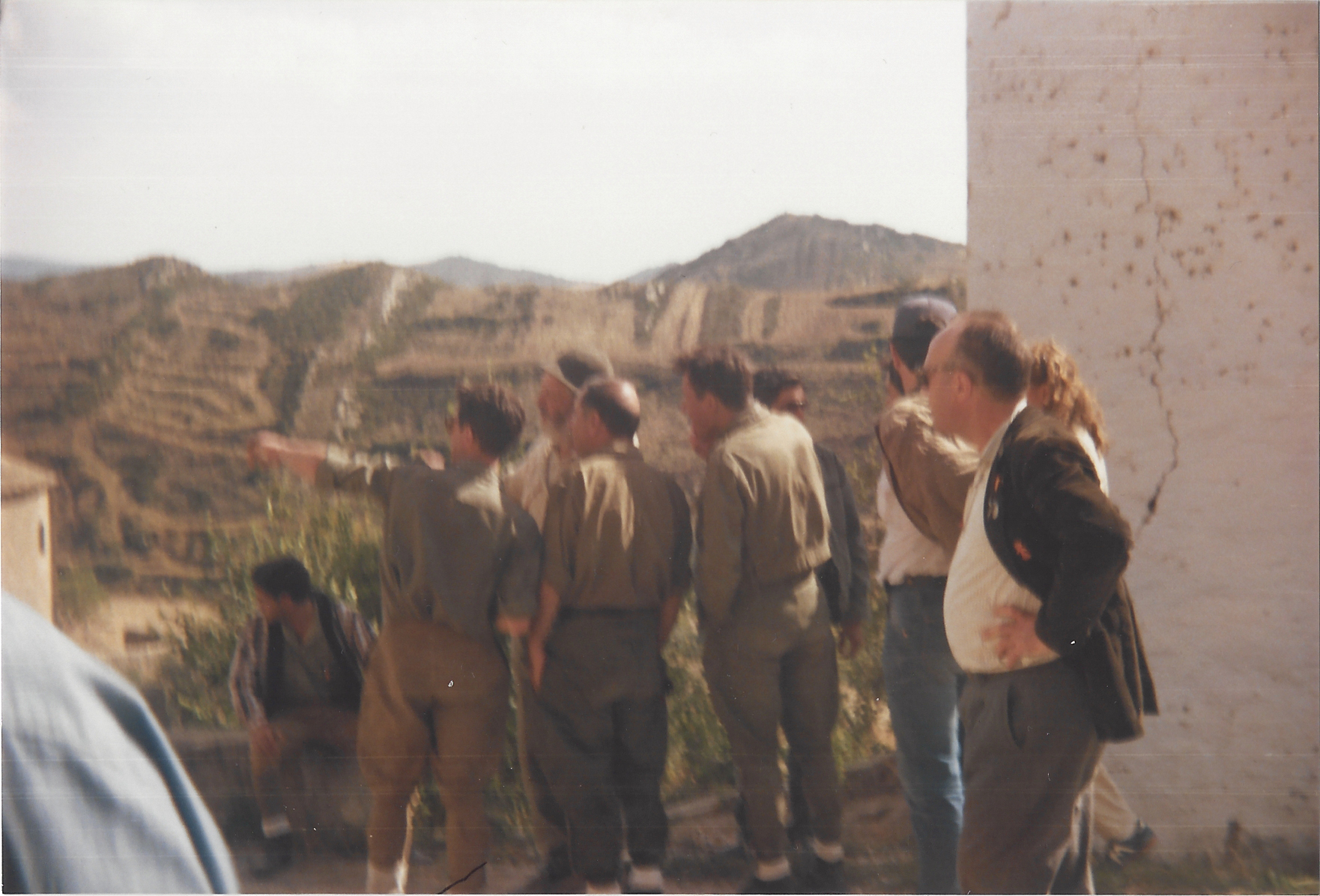

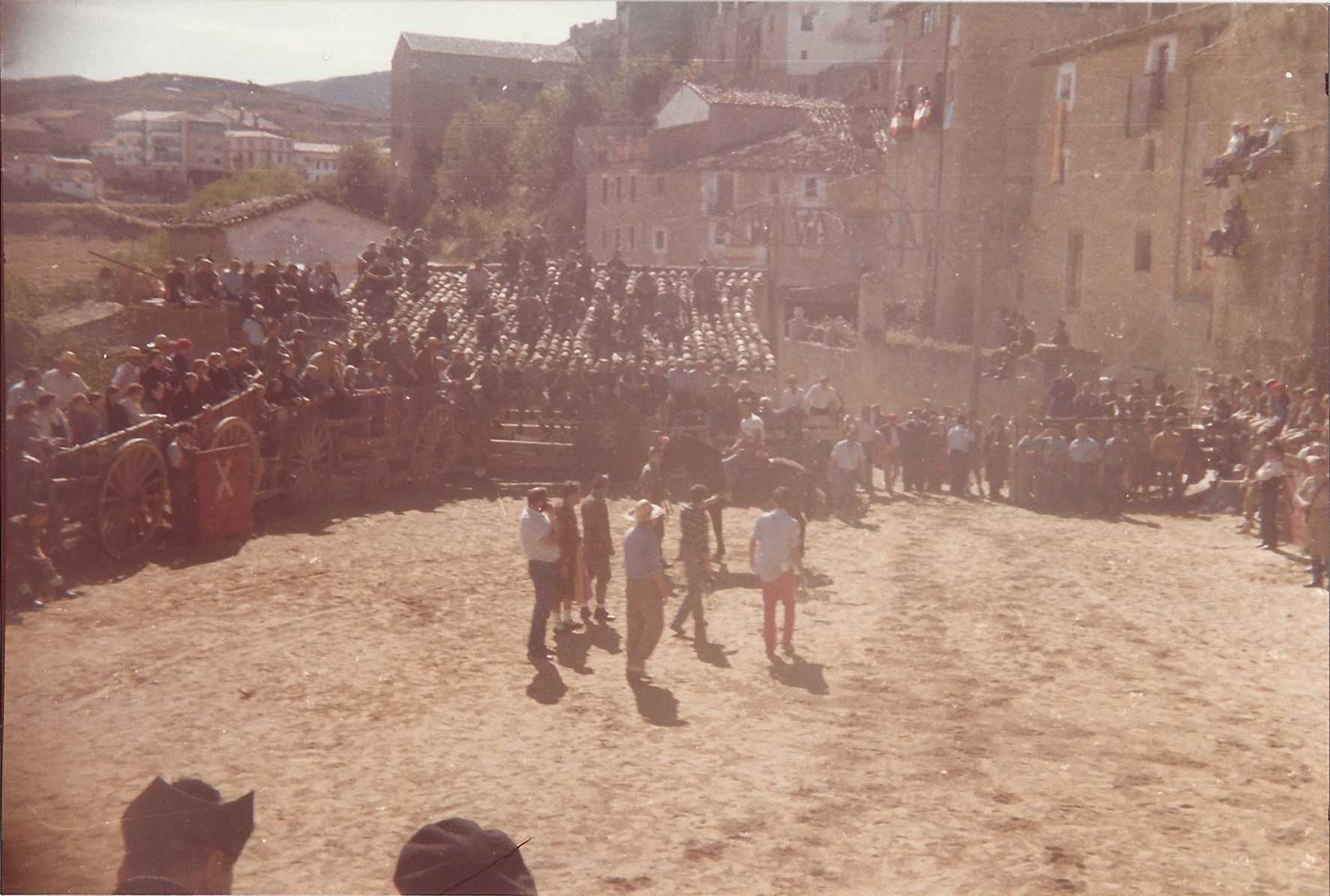

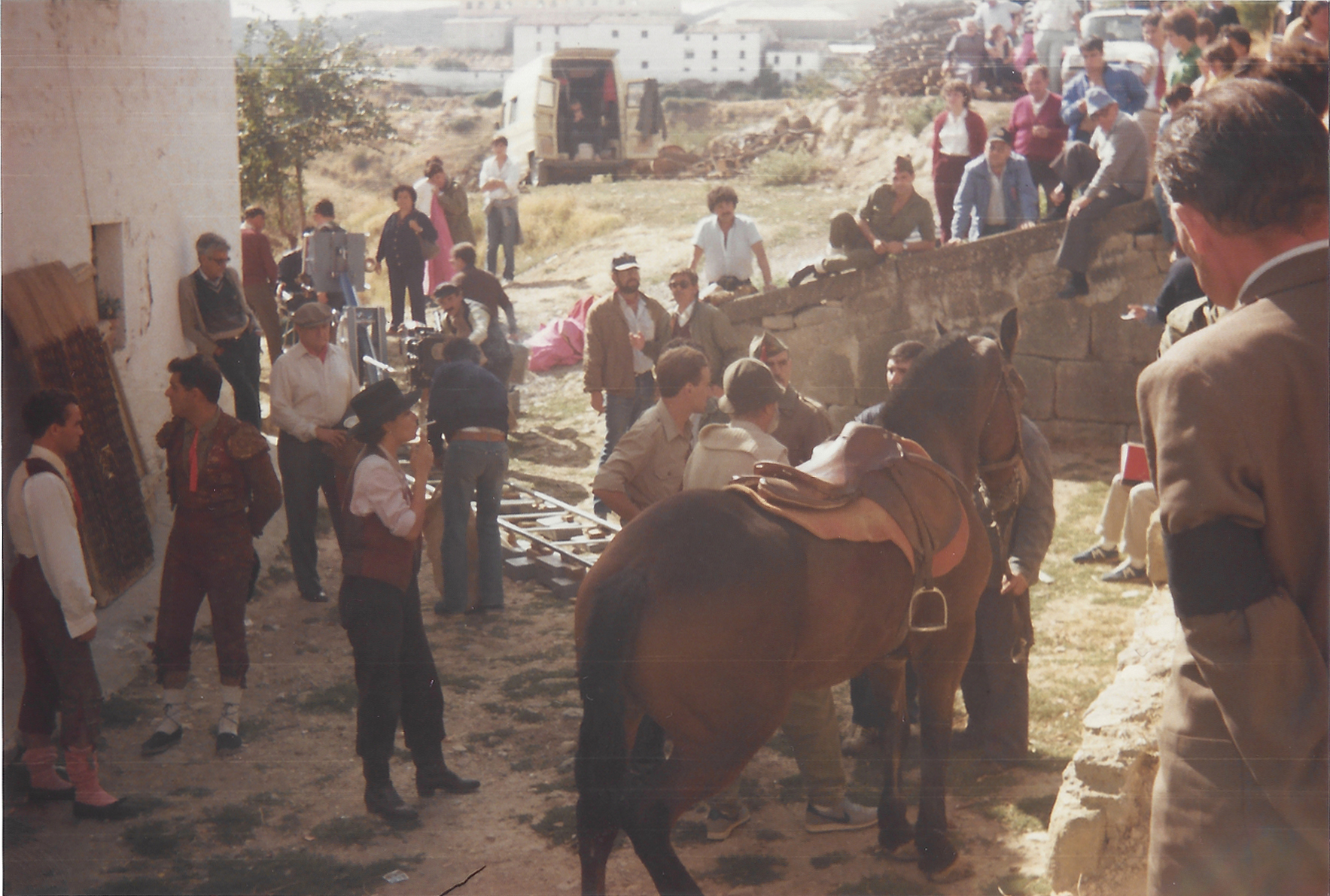
