= La tesis de Nancy =

1962 novel by Ramón J. Sender

- Author: Ramón J. Sender
- Publication date: 1962
- Followed by: Nancy, doctora en gitanería

La tesis de Nancy is a 1962 novel written by Ramón J. Sender. It uses a humoristic style about Spanish folklore, and Protestantism. Mi amigo invisible, by Guillermo Fesser, is considered a new version of this novel; and Saliendo de la Estación de Atocha is also considered an updating. It was a best-seller.
