= La Tía Tula =

La tía Tula
- Theatrical release poster
- Directed by: Miguel Picazo
- Screenplay by: José Miguel Hernán; Luis Sánchez Enciso; Manuel López Yubero; Miguel Picazo
- Starring: Aurora Bautista; Carlos Estrada; Enriqueta Carballeira; Irene Gutiérrez Caba
- Cinematography: Juan Julio Baena
- Music by: Antonio Pérez Olea
- Production company: Eco Films / Surco Films
- Release date: 1964
- Running time: 105 minutes
- Country: Spain
- Language: Spanish

La Tía Tula (Aunt Tula) is a 1964 film Spanish film directed by Miguel Picazo. The film is based on the Miguel de Unamuno novella of the same title. Highly acclaimed, the film is widely considered a classic of Spanish cinema. The film was selected as the Spanish entry for the Best Foreign Language Film at the 38th Academy Awards, but was not accepted as a nominee.

Shooting locations included Brihuega, Cívica and Guadalajara.

== Plot ==
Tula, a 31-year-old unmarried woman, whose sister has just died, decides to bring her brother-in-law Ramiro, a bank employee, and his two children into her home. As she takes over the management of their lives, she gradually usurps the privileges of her brother-in-law and his children. She acts as a wife mother figure, but does not accept the sexual commitments or maternal responsibilities of her new role.

Ramiro is attracted to Tula as she dotes on his children, but she spurns his affections. She is also critical of his interest in other women. As Ramiro's sexual frustration grows, he attempts to rape Tula. Tula's priest advises her to marry Ramiro. Tula insists on maintaining a platonic relationship as she is used to being her own mistress, but rather than expel them from her house decides to take them to her village and with the presence of more relatives redirect Ramiro's feelings to the memory of her dead sister. Ramiro rapes Tula's nubile teenage cousin Juanita at the first opportunity but the rest of the family are unaware until months later it is evident Juanita is pregnant. Ramiro is forced to marry her, taking his children and new wife to a life out of the provinces and into the city.

The closing scene shows Tula waving goodbye to the ménage as the train departs, resigned to her spinster status.

== Cast ==
- Aurora Bautista as Tula
- Carlos Estrada as Ramiro
- María Enriqueta Caballeira as Juanita
- Laly Soldevila as Amalita
- Mari Loli Cobo as Tulita
- Irene Gutiérrez Caba as Herminia

== See also ==
- List of submissions to the 38th Academy Awards for Best Foreign Language Film
- List of Spanish submissions for the Academy Award for Best Foreign Language Film

== Notes ==
- Schwartz, Ronald, The Great Spanish Films: 1950- 1990, Scarecrow Press, London, 1991, ISBN 0-8108-2488-4
