= The Court of the Pharaoh =

- Theatrical release poster
- Original title: La corte de Faraón
- Directed by: José Luis García Sánchez
- Screenplay by: Rafael Azcona; José Luis García Sánchez
- Based on: La corte de Faraón (zarzuela) by Guillermo Perrín, Miguel Palacios, and Vicente Lleó
- Starring: Ana Belén; Fernando Fernán Gómez; Antonio Banderas; Josema Yuste; Agustín González; Quique Camoiras; Mary Carmen Ramírez; Juan Diego; Guillermo Montesinos; José Luis López Vázquez
- Cinematography: José Luis Alcaine
- Edited by: Pablo G. del Amo
- Music by: Luis Cobos
- Production companies: Lince Films; TVE
- Release dates: September 1985 (Zinemaldia); 26 September 1985 (Spain)
- Country: Spain
- Language: Spanish

The Court of the Pharaoh (Spanish: La corte de Faraón) is a 1985 Spanish film directed by José Luis García Sánchez from a screenplay by Rafael Azcona and García Sánchez inspired by the 1910 zarzuela La corte de Faraón written by Guillermo Perrín and Miguel Palacios and composed by Vicente Lleó. It stars Ana Belén.

== Plot ==
Set in 1940s Madrid, the plot follows a group of thespians staging a play of La corte de Faraón and the play thereby being censored by the Francoist authorities on the basis of its moral laxity.

== Cast ==
- Ana Belén as Mari Pili / Lota / Sul
- Fernando Fernán-Gómez as Roque Collado
- José Luis López Vázquez as comisario Vicente
- Antonio Banderas as fray José
- Josema Yuste as Putifar / Tarsicio
- Agustín González as padre Calleja
- Quique Camoiras
- Mary Carmen Ramírez as Fernanda / Reina
- Juan Diego as Roberto
- Guillermo Montesinos as Antonio
- María Luisa Ponte as Patricia
- Millán Salcedo
- Antonio Gamero as inspector Ramírez
- Luis Ciges
- Guillermo Marín

== Production ==
The film is a Lince Films and TVE production. Shooting locations included Madrid's Teatro Martín.

== Release ==
The film screened at the 33rd San Sebastián International Film Festival in September 1985, winning a Silver Shell award. It was released theatrically in Spain on 26 September 1985. It grossed 239,902,713 ₧ (87,160 admissions).

== Reception ==
Ángel Fernández-Santos of El País considered that the film starts off poorly, but it improves after half an hour, thereby emerging a series of sequences with "major cinema within".

== See also ==
- List of Spanish films of 1985
