= Julio Llamazares =

Spanish journalist and novelist (born 1955)

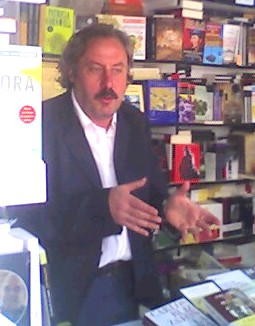
Julio Llamazares.

Julio Llamazares (born 28 March 1955) is a Spanish author born in Vegamián, León Province.

== Biography ==
Julio Llamazares is a poet, novelist and a prolific essayist and journalist. He focuses on themes such as the history and memory of Spanish society, both individual and collective and, in particular, the progressive decline of the rural cultural heritage. His work encompasses multiple genres, including 6 novels as well as various collections of poems, short stories and essays, travel writing, screenplays and journalism. He has had a regular column in El País since the early 1980s and has been featured on radio and TV.

His first works were two collections of poetry: La lentitud de los bueyes, first published in 1979 and La memoria de la nieve, published in 1982.

His first novel, Luna de lobos, was published in 1985 and made into a film in 1987, directed by Julio Sánchez Valdés, with a cast including Santiago Ramos, Antonio Resines and Kiti Mánver. It relates the story of a group of four fugitives caught on the wrong side of enemy lines in the early days of the Spanish Civil War, who held out for nine years hiding in the Cantabrian mountains in attempt to avoid the savage Nationalist repression. It has recently been translated into English and published as Wolf Moon. In the words of Dr Chris Bannister, writing for the Arts & Humanities Research Council, “Wolf Moon is a moving account of the horrors of Francoism and the pressures the dictatorship exerted upon those that lived under it.”

His second novel, La Lluvia amarilla, was published in 1988 (translated into English and published as The Yellow Rain), relates the story of the last inhabitant of Ainielle, a village in the province of Huesca in the Spanish Pyrenees, now abandoned and in ruins.

For many years Llamazares has indicated that he does not wish his publications to be considered for any further prizes. In 2016, he respectfully withdrew his most recent novel, Distintas formas de mirar el agua, from the short list for the Premio de la Crítica de Castilla y León (Castilla & Leon Critics' Prize).

== Works ==
Narrative

- Luna de lobos (1985), novel
- La lluvia amarilla (1988), novel
- Escenas del cine mudo (1994), novel
- En mitad de ninguna parte (1995), stories
- Tres historias verdaderas (1998), stories
- El cielo de Madrid (2005), novel
- Las lágrimas de San Lorenzo (2013), novel
- Distintas formas de mirar el agua (2015), novel
- Vagalume (2023), novel

Poetry

- La lentitud de los bueyes (1979)
- Memoria de la nieve (1982)
- Versos y Ortigas: 1973-2008 (2009)

Essays and Articles

- El entierro de Genarín: Evangelio apócrifo del último heterodoxo español (1981)
- En Babia (1991), newspaper articles
- Nadie escucha (1995), newspaper articles
- En mitad de ninguna parte (1995), newspaper articles
- Los viajeros de Madrid (1998), newspaper articles
- Modernos y elegantes (2006), newspaper articles
- Entre perro y lobo (2008), newspaper articles

Travel writing

- El río del olvido (1990)
- Trás-os-montes (1998)
- Cuaderno del Duero (1999)
- Las rosas de piedra (2008)
- Atlas de la España imaginaria (2015)
- El viaje de Don Quijote (2016)
- Las rosas del sur (2018)

Screenplays

- Retrato de un bañista (1984)
- Luna de lobos (1987)
- El techo del mundo (1995)
- Flores de otro mundo (1999)

Anthology

- Antología y Voz; El Búho Viajero (2007)

Other

- Historia de una pasión included in Cristina García Rodero Second edition (2008). ISBN 9788492841004.

== Translations into English ==
Narrative

- The Yellow Rain (La lluvia amarilla) translated by Margaret Jull Costa, Harvill Press (2003) ISBN 018-604695-2
- Wolf Moon (Luna de lobos) translated by Simon Deefholts & Kathryn Phillips-Miles, Peter Owen Publishers/Istros Books, (2017) ISBN 978-07206-1949-2

Essays & Articles

- My childhood hero has died (Muere el héroe de mi infancia) translated by Simon Deefholts & Kathryn Phillips-Miles, included as Afterword in Wolf Moon, Peter Owen Publishers/Istros Books, (2017). Original article published in La Crónica de León, 06 Jun 2004 and reproduced in Entre Perro y Lobo (2008).
- Postmemory (La posmemoria) translated by Simon Deefholts & Kathryn Phillips-Miles, published on Peter Owen Publishers website (2017). Original article published in El País 29 Nov 2006.

== Awards ==
- 1978: Premio Antonio González de Lama.
- 1982: Premio Jorge Guillén.
- 1983: Premio Ícaro.
- 1992: Premio de Periodismo El Correo Español-El pueblo vasco.
- 1993: Premio Nonino.
- 1994: Premio Cardo d’Oro.
- 1994: Premio ITAS del libro dei montagni.
- 1999: "Best film" in International Critics’ Week at the Cannes International Festival, jointly with Icíar Bollaín.
