= Ángel o demonio =

- Genre: Fantasy; Drama; Romance
- Created by: D.C. Torallas; Joaquín Górriz
- Starring: Aura Garrido; Jaime Olías; Manu Fullola; Mar Saura
- Country of origin: Spain
- Original language: Spanish
- No. of seasons: 2
- No. of episodes: 22

Production
- Production company: Plural Entertainment

Original release
- Network: Telecinco
- Release: 1 February – 13 July 2011

Ángel o demonio (lit.: "Angel or Demon") is a Spanish supernatural drama television series produced by Plural Entertainment. Created by D.C. Torallas and Joaquín Górriz and starring, among others, Aura Garrido, Jaime Olías, Manu Fullola and Mar Saura, the two seasons of the series aired in 2011 on Telecinco. The plot concerns a struggle between good and evil, pitting "angels" against "fallen ones".

== Premise ==
Valeria a 17-year-old student taking 2º de Bachillerato finds out she is not a common person but an angel. Caught in between an age-old war between good an evil, Valeria is initially tutored by the angel Natael, but she feels attracted to the mysterious Damián.

== Cast ==
- Aura Garrido as Valeria Gascón
- Jaime Olías as Damián
- Manu Fullola as Natael
- Mar Saura as Alexia
- Carla Nieto as Iris
- Jorge Suquet as Graziel
- Carmen Sánchez as Duna
- Jaime Pujol as Juan Carlos
- Maru Valdivieso as Laia
- Daniel Grao as Valafar
- Roberto Hoyas as Adrián
- Laura Aparicio as Fátima
- Nazaret Aracil as Miranda
- Robert Pinter as Rudy
- Àlex Maruny as Joel
- Susi Sánchez as Gabriel
- Rocío Muñoz as Samanta
- Aitana Hercal as Isa

Besides the regular cast, the second season featured a number of cameos of popular actors and actresses, such as Natalia Sánchez, Marta Torné, Nacho Fresneda, Manuela Velasco, Adam Jezierski, Miriam Giovanelli, Ana Rujas, Pedro Casablanc, Arantxa del Sol, Luz Valdenebro, Julián Villagrán, Jan Cornet, Pau Colera, Aghnes Kiraly, Gorka Lasaosa, Eduard Farelo, Martjin Kuiper, Meghello Blanco and Marta Cruz.

== Production and release ==
The series was produced by Plural Entertainment for Cuatro. Following the merging of the companies operating Cuatro and Telecinco the latter channel eventually took on the series. The creators of the series were D.C. Torallas and Joaquín Górriz.

An industrial estate in Pinto was used as filming set.

The first episode of the series premiered on Telecinco on 1 February 2011. Starting with "adequate" audience scores in the opener (3,300,000 viewers; 15.9% share), the audience plummeted in the last episodes of the season, reaching its lowest point in the season finale (a 8.9% share), aired on 10 May 2011. The series had been renovated for an already filmed second season comprising 9 episodes, which was released without a halt on 17 May.

The series ended on 13 July 2011, with 1,804,000 viewers and a 10,8% share, averaging the two seasons.

Upon the time of its release, a number of notes observed that the series was riding the wave of The Twilight Saga fantasy romance film series in vogue at the time, whereas Jaime Olías (the actor playing the fallen angel Damián) was dubbed by fans as the "Spanish Robert Pattinson", Edward Cullen in the Twilight films. Reviewing the first episode, Alberto Rey (writing in El Mundo website) described the series as a "Twilight without vampires" and as a Joan of Arcadia adapted to the manual of the typical Spanish series.
