= Violeta Cela =

Spanish actress

Violeta Bravo Cela (born December 7, 1960) is a Spanish actress, model, columnist and voice actress. She is the cousin of Paloma Cela and second niece of Nobel Prize winning writer Camilo José Cela.

Born in Madrid, Spain, Cela began her acting career at the age of 15 in the theatre production Violines y trompetas and made her cinema debut with a leading role in the 1978 film Silvia ama a Raquel. In 1982 she played the main character Juanita in the Spanish television series Juanita, la Larga.

She has since appeared in a total of 69 films and 28 plays (including the classical genre, high comedy and musical). She is also known for her many performances in dubbing films as well as her role as an opinion columnist for Spanish national newspaper ABC.

In 2005 she starred in the opera La memoria de las aguas by Uve Müllrich of German rock band Dissidenten.

== Selected filmography ==
- The Heifer (1985)
- Year of Enlightment (1986)
- Amanece, que no es poco (1989)
