= Year of Enlightment =

- Theatrical release poster
- Directed by: Fernando Trueba
- Written by: Rafael Azcona; Fernando Trueba
- Produced by: Andrés Vicente Gómez
- Starring: Jorge Sanz, Maribel Verdú, Manuel Alexandre, Chus Lampreave, Verónica Forqué
- Cinematography: Juan Amorós
- Edited by: Carmen Frías
- Music by: Francisco Guerrero
- Release date: 5 December 1986
- Running time: 103 minutes
- Country: Spain
- Language: Spanish

Year of Enlightment (Spanish: El año de las luces, and also released as The Year of the Awakening) is a 1986 Spanish film directed by Fernando Trueba, starring Jorge Sanz and Maribel Verdú. The film is a coming of age story of a sixteen-year-old boy finding love and sex in the aftermath of the Spanish Civil War. The film was awarded the Silver Bear at the 37th Berlin International Film Festival.

== Plot ==
In the spring of 1940 in the aftermath of the Spanish Civil war, two sons of a fallen soldier, Manolo, a sixteen-year-old boy, and his eight-year-old little brother Jesús are suffering from symptoms of tuberculosis. Their much older brother, Pepe, takes them to a rural sanatorium in Sierra de Gata near the border with Portugal. They stay there to recover their health under the watch of Irene, the director.

Manolo is the only adolescent, all the others are children. Starting his sexual awakening, he is smitten with Vicenta, the attractive woman in charge of the care of the children. Every night when she undresses Manolo spies her. However, Manolo's flirtations and sexual advances do not find response in either Vicenta or Paquita, a young girl who also works at the sanatorium. Instead is the sexually repressed head nurse Irene, who is infatuated with the young boy. Forced to assist to classes against his will with the much younger children in the residence, Manolo clashes violently with the conservative authoritarianism of Doña Tránsito, the teacher. After a confrontation with her, Manolo is left to study on his own. Emilio an old free thinker and janitor of the sanatorium guides Manolo in his readings and teaches him about Montaigne, Balzac and Flaubert.

Disappointed with the sudden departure of Vicenta, who has to leave her job, Manolo is soon infatuated with Vicenta's successor, María Jesús, a young pretty girl from the village and only one year his junior. Manolo's friend, Emilio, encourages him in the awakening of his romance with María Jesús. The two teenagers are promptly discovering together their first love and sexual awakening. Irene discovers them when kissing in the infirmary. She fires Maria Jesus and sends her with her uncle the local priest, abruptly stopping their romance; María Jesús is actually the priest illegitimate daughter. Pepe, an Army officer, comes back to take Manolo with the rest of their family and the young lovers are separated forever.

== Cast ==
The two teenage leads Jorge Sanz and Maribel Verdú were subsequently cast together in many Spanish films throughout the 1980s and 1990s, most notably in Amantes, directed by Vicente Aranda.

- Jorge Sanz - Manolo
- Maribel Verdú - María Jesús
- Verónica Forqué - Irene
- Manuel Alexandre - Emilio
- Rafaela Aparicio - Rafaela
- Santiago Ramos - Pepe
- Chus Lampreave - Doña Tránsito
- Lucas Martín - Jesús
- José Sazatornil - Don Teodulo
- Violeta Cela - Vicenta
- Diana Peñalver - Paquita

== Overview ==
El Año de las Luces, a sensitive rites of passage film was co-authored by Rafael Azcona and the director Fernando Trueba, who later worked together on the Oscar-winning Belle Époque a film similar in tone, setting and period. El Año de las Luces, is based on an episode of the real life of Manule Huete the director's father in law. A large scale production it was shot with panoramic lenses, in gorgeous color in Ponte de Lima, Portugal, Quintanar de Sanabria, Zamora and in Madrid. It premiered on December 5, 1986 and was awarded with a Silver Bear for an outstanding single achievement at the 37th Berlin International Film Festival.

== DVD release ==
El Año de las Luces is available in Region 2 DVD in Spanish with no English subtitles.
