= Amparo Barayón =

Spanish pianist and anarcho-syndicalist activist (1904–1936)

Amparo Barayón Miguel
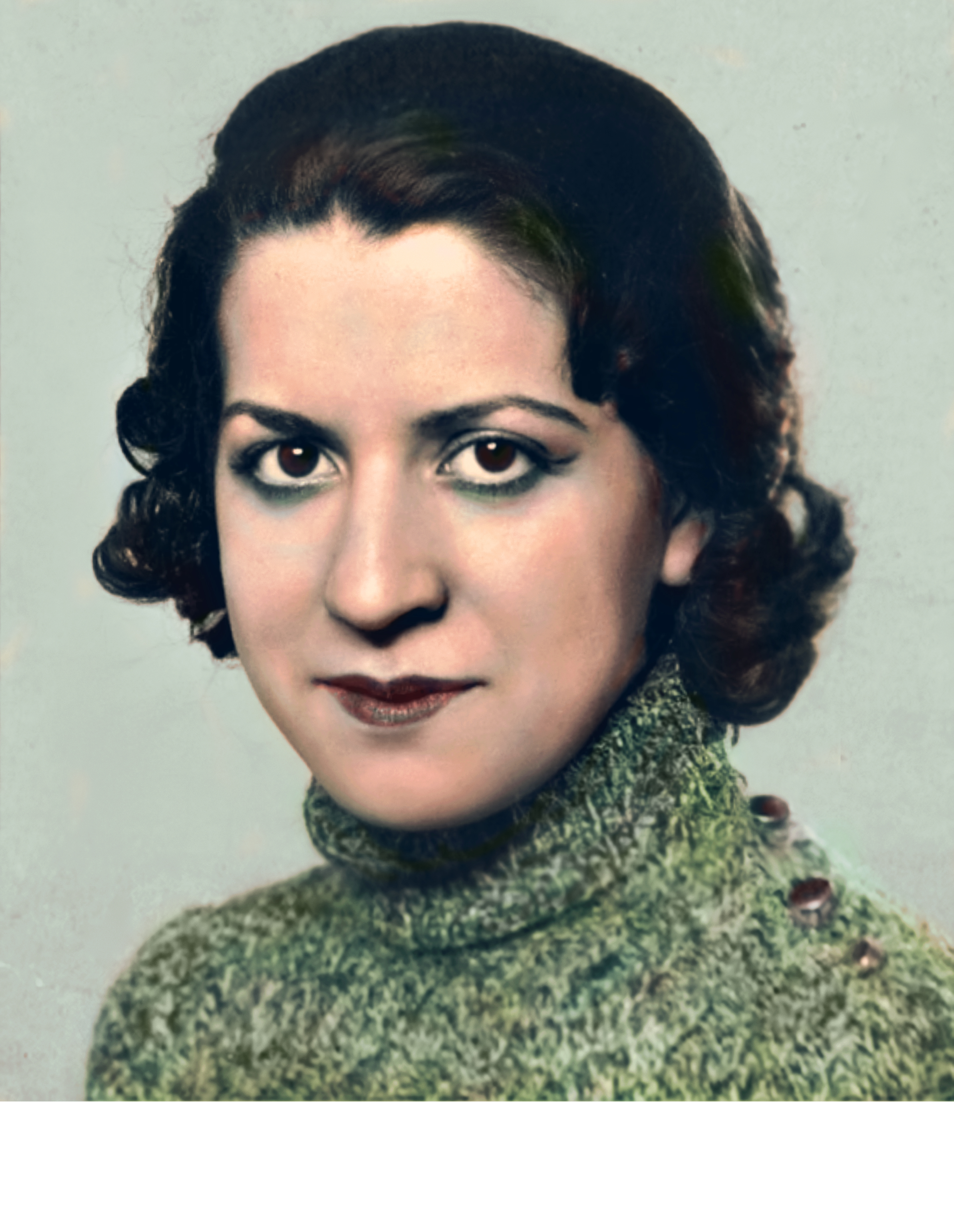
- Born: 8 May 1904; Zamora, Spain
- Died: 18 November 1936 (aged 32); Zamora, Spain
- Cause of death: Extrajudicial execution
- Occupations: Pianist, telephone switchboard operator
- Spouse: Ramón J. Sender
- Children: 2, including Ramón Sender Barayón

Amparo Barayón Miguel (8 May 1904 – 18 November 1936) was a Spanish pianist and anarcho-syndicalist trade unionist. Originally from Zamora, she moved to Madrid and worked as a telephone switchboard operator, joining the Confederación Nacional del Trabajo (CNT). She married the novelist Ramón J. Sender and had two children, Ramón and Andrea.

In the early months of the Spanish Civil War, Barayón returned to Zamora with her children, thinking they would be safer in her hometown. However, she and her infant daughter were arrested and imprisoned by fascist Francoist forces. After a difficult imprisonment, Barayón was executed by a death squad and thrown into a mass grave. Both of her children were sent to an orphanage, and the International Red Cross reunited them with their father. The family ultimately emigrated to the United States. Years later, her son returned to Spain to research and write a biography about her, titled A Death in Zamora.
