= Dawn Breaks, Which Is No Small Thing =

- Theatrical release poster
- Spanish: Amanece, que no es poco
- Directed by: José Luis Cuerda
- Written by: José Luis Cuerda
- Starring: Antonio Resines; José Sazatornil; Cassen; Chus Lampreave; Rafael Alonso; Pastora Vega; Guillermo Montesinos; Manuel Alexandre; Luis Ciges; Miguel Rellán; María Isbert; Aurora Bautista; Ovidi Montllor; Antonio Gamero; Fedra Llorente; Quique San Francisco; Queta Claver; Gabino Diego; Violeta Cela; Fernando Valverde
- Cinematography: Porfirio Enríquez
- Edited by: Juan I. Sanmateo
- Music by: José Nieto
- Distributed by: United International Pictures
- Release dates: 13 January 1989 (Albacete); 17 January 1989 (Spain)
- Running time: 110 minutes
- Country: Spain
- Language: Spanish

Dawn Breaks, Which Is No Small Thing (Spanish: Amanece, que no es poco) is a 1989 Spanish surrealist comedy film written and directed by José Luis Cuerda. It has attained cult film status.

== Plot ==
The plot tracks the absurd situations unravelling upon the arrival of an engineer and his father in a village in the mountains of the province of Albacete and the behaviour of the locals.

== Cast ==
- José Sazatornil as cabo Gutiérrez
- Carmen de Lirio as Doña Rocío, su señora
- Ovidi Montllor as Pascual
- Carmen Rodríguez as su mujer
- Rafael Díaz as Fermín
- Amada Tercero as su mujer
- Cassen as cura párroco
- Manuel Alexandre as Paquito as su padre
- María Ángeles Ariza as Merceditas as su prima
- Rafael Alonso as el alcalde
- Fedra Lorente as Susan, su amiga
- Cris Huerta as Tirso, el mesonero (billed as Chris Huertas)
- Elisa Belmonte as soprano
- María I. González as pianista
- Francisco Hernández as don Roberto, maestro escuela
- Jorge V. Ortiz as Rafaelito
- Samuel Claxton as Nge Ndomo
- Chus Lampreave as Álvarez, su madre
- Alberto Bové as Pedro, su tío
- Luis Ciges as Jimmy
- Antonio Resines as Teodoro
- Aurora Bautista as La Padington
- Arturo Bonín as Bruno
- María Isbert as Adelaida, la hija
- María Elena Flores as Aurora, la madre
- Paco Cambres as don Alonso, el médico
- Queta Claver as doña Remedios, su mujer
- Miguel Rellán as Carmelo, el borracho
- Rosalía Dans as Gabriela, su mujer
- Pastora Vega as Elena, la Labradora
- Fernando Valverde as intellectual
- Ferran Rañé as Mariano
- Antonio Passy as Garcinuño
- Alberto Delgado as Joven
- Francisco Martínez as Sixto, su hijo
- Quique San Francisco as Cascales
- Antonio Gamero as el feriante
- Gabino Diego as portavoz estadounidense

== Production ==
Shooting locations in the province of Albacete included Aýna, Liétor, and Molinicos.

== Release ==
The film received a pre-screening in Albacete on 13 January 1989. It was released theatrically in Spain on 17 January 1989.

== Accolades ==
| Year | Award | Category | Nominee(s) | Result | Ref. |
|---|---|---|---|---|---|
| 1990 | 4th Goya Awards | Best Original Screenplay | José Luis Cuerda | Nominated | |
| 1990 | 4th Goya Awards | Best Sound | Carlos Faruolo, Enrique Molinero | Nominated | |
| 1990 | 4th Goya Awards | Best Special Effects | Reyes Abades | Nominated | |

== See also ==
- List of Spanish films of 1989

== Bibliography ==
- José Luis Cuerda, Amanece, que no es poco, Pepitas de calabaza, 2013.
