= Los ladrones van a la oficina =

Spanish comedy television show

- Genre: Sitcom
- Directed by: Tito Fernández; Miguel Angel Díez
- Country of origin: Spain
- Original language: Spanish
- No. of seasons: 10
- No. of episodes: 125

Production
- Producer: Miguel Ángel Bernardeau

Original release
- Network: Antena 3

Los ladrones van a la oficina (The thieves go to the office) is a Spanish comedy television show, broadcast between 1993 and 1996 on Antena 3. Starring José Luis López Vázquez, Fernando Fernán Gómez, Manuel Alexandre, Agustín González, Anabel Alonso and Antonio Resines, the series won an Onda award in 1993.

== Plot ==
The series takes place in a bar called "La Oficina" (The Office), which is located in a Madrid street called "San Esteban de Pravia" (named the same as the town where the director was born). The bar is run by "Pruden" (Anabel Alonso) and her husband, "Smith" (Antonio Resines). A group of thieves, headed up by "Don Anselmo" (Fernando Fernán Gómez), and the veterans "Escabeche" (José Luis López Vázquez) and "Anticuario" (Manuel Alexandre), regularly meet there. The three friends, who reminisce over cons and plan new ones, are closely watched by the clumsy but good-natured "Comisario García" (Agustín González) and his assistant, "Inspector Gutiérrez" (Roberto Cairo).

== Cast ==
- José Luis López Vázquez – Antonio Pedraza Sánchez, "Escabeche"
- Fernando Fernán Gómez – Don Anselmo Prieto Díaz
- Anabel Alonso – Prudencia Prieto Romerales, "Pruden"
- Antonio Resines – Emilio Gómez Saénz, "Smith"
- Guillermo Montesinos – Casimiro Durán, "Durán"
- Manuel Alexandre – Arsenio Vázquez Izquierdo, "Anticuario"
- Mabel Lozano – Remedios Gutiérrez Engracia, "Reme"
- Agustín González – Manuel García García, "Comisario García"
- Roberto Cairo – Inspector Eusebio Gutiérrez
- Mary Carmen Ramírez – Lucila
- Rossy de Palma – Eva Duarte

== Awards and nominations ==
- Onda awards

Year	Category	Nominee	Result
1993	National Television Awards		Winner
