= Aurora Bautista =

Spanish actress

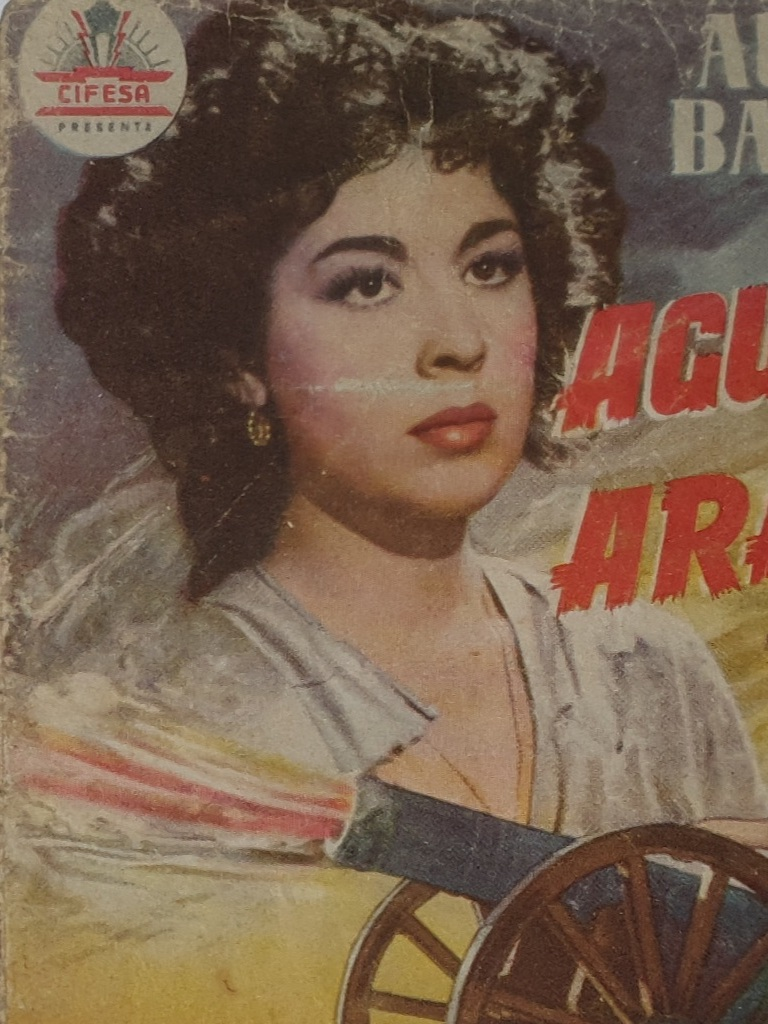
- Bautista in a detail of the poster of Agustina of Aragon (1950)
- Born: Aurora Bautista Zúmel; 15 October 1925; Villanueva de los Infantes (Valladolid), Spain
- Died: 27 August 2012 (aged 86); Madrid, Spain
- Occupation: Actress

Aurora Bautista Zúmel (15 October 1925 – 27 August 2012) was a Spanish film actress.

Bautista was born in Villanueva de los Infantes, and died in Madrid, aged 86.

== Biography ==
She spent her youth in Madrid, where she studied at the Instituto-Escuela. After the Civil War, her father was sentenced to death for collaborating with the Second Spanish Republic and then deported 700 kilometers from Madrid. The family moved to Barcelona. There, in 1941, she began studying drama with Guillermo Díaz-Plaja and Marta Grau at the Instituto del Teatro, where Cayetano Luca de Tena discovered her when he went to give a lecture, and later hired her for the Teatro Español (Madrid) company. She made her professional debut in 1944 in Jacinto Benavente's play La malquerida with Lola Membrives' company. In 1945, she performed William Shakespeare's A Midsummer Night's Dream in Madrid with the Teatro Español company, under the direction of Cayetano Luca de Tena. This was followed by, among others,Friedrich Schiller La conjuración de Fiesco (1946), Eduardo Marquina's El monje blanco (1946), Leandro Fernández de Moratín's El sí de las niñas (1948), Victor Hugo's María Tudor, Antígona, The Double-Headed Eagle by Jean Cocteau, The Bourgeois Gentleman by Molière, and Richard III by William Shakespeare.

While working on plays from the classical repertoire, in 1948, director Juan de Orduña offered her the role of Queen Juana in the film Locura de amor (Madness of Love), alongside Fernando Rey, quickly becoming one of the most prominent stars of Spanish cinema at the time.

Following her success, she signed an exclusive contract with the production company Cifesa, which reunited her with Juan de Orduña in Pequeñeces... y Agustina de Aragón (1950) and with Manuel Mur Oti and Carlos Lemos in Condenados (1953). In 1961, she worked with de Orduña again, playing another historically significant character, Teresa of Ávila.

A certain decline in her film career in the late 1950s brought her back to the theater under the direction of José Tamayo and Luis Escobar Kirkpatrick, almost always with classical texts (Antigone, Medea, Fuenteovejuna), with exceptions such as William Faulkner's Requiem for a Woman (1958), Tennessee Williams' Cat on a Hot Tin Roof (1959), and Federico García Lorca Yerma (1960), in one of its first performances during the Franco regime, when performing this author's work was not without risk.

== Selected filmography ==
- 1948 Madness for Love, by Juan de Orduña
- 1950 Pequeñeces, by Juan de Orduña
- 1950 Agustina of Aragon, by Juan de Orduña
- 1953 Condenados, by Manuel Mur Oti
- 1956 The Cat
- 1959 El marido, by Nanni Loy and Gianni Puccini
- 1959 Sonatas, by Juan Antonio Bardem
- 1963 La Tía Tula, by Miguel Picazo
- 1969 Pepa Doncel, by Luis Lucia
- 1973 A Candle for the Devil, by Eugenio Martín
- 1985 Extramuros, by Miguel Picazo
- 1987 Divinas palabras, by José Luis García Sánchez
- 1988 Amanece, que no es poco, by José Luis Cuerda
- 1999 Adiós con el corazón, by José Luis García Sánchez
