= The Knight of the Dragon =

1985 film

- Theatrical release poster
- Spanish: El caballero del dragón
- Directed by: Fernando Colomo
- Written by: Fernando Colomo; Andreu Martín; Miguel Ángel Nieto
- Produced by: Fernando Colomo; José Esteban Lasala
- Starring: Miguel Bosé; Klaus Kinski; Harvey Keitel; Fernando Rey
- Cinematography: José Luis Alcaine
- Edited by: Miguel Ángel Santamaría
- Music by: José Nieto
- Distributed by: Warner Española S.A.
- Release date: 20 December 1985
- Running time: 90 minutes
- Country: Spain
- Language: Spanish
- Budget: 400 million pesetas ($4 million USD)

The Knight of the Dragon (Spanish: El caballero del dragón), a.k.a. Star Knight, is a 1985 Spanish adventure film directed by Fernando Colomo. It stars Miguel Bosé alongside Klaus Kinski, Harvey Keitel and Fernando Rey.

== Plot ==
The people of Roque are terrorised by the arrival of a "dragon" and refuse to pay their taxes to the Count. The Count's enforcer, Klever, dreams of being knighted and marrying the Count's daughter Alba, but the Count and Alba both consider him a fool. The Count's preoccupation is with his health, and he places great trust in his alchemist Boecius, who has cured him of various ailments and is searching for the Elixir of Life. Seeking adventure, Alba sneaks out of the castle and encounters the Green Knight, who swears his allegiance to her and promises to stop further travellers following her across a bridge (a promise he endeavours to keep, ineffectually, for the remainder of the film). While swimming in a lake shortly afterwards, Alba is pulled underwater and vanishes. The Count declares a period of mourning.

Fray Lupo, the Count's spiritual advisor, blames all the ills on Boecius, who he considers a devil-worshipper. His condemnation of Boecius is interrupted when Alba returns in a catatonic state. Boecius restores her to her normal state and she tells him of an apparently spiritual experience and where to find the "dragon". Boecius travels there and discovers that the dragon is actually an alien spacecraft. Its pilot, IX, who resembles a human, tells him of his purpose as a researcher and gives Boecius a crystal device containing further information. Boecius tells Alba of IX's affection for her, but that IX cannot remove his spacesuit as the local atmosphere will kill him. IX later visits the castle and absconds with Alba. Klever tries to stop him, but the spacesuit proves impervious to his weapons. Klever then lies to the Count that Alba was violently abducted and promised him her hand in marriage and half the Count's lands if he would save her. The Count offers the same reward to whoever slays the dragon and rescues Alba.

Using IX's crystal, Boecius distills a version of the Elixir, but is arrested by Lupo and Klever in a palace coup. Boecius manages to save one drop of the Elixir before Lupo destroys his laboratory and the crystal. From Boecius's notes, Klever determines how to remove IX's armour, and that whoever wears the armour will control the spaceship. Lupo forces the Count to knight Klever, then confines the Count to his quarters. With Boecius as a hostage, Lupo and Klever ride to the spaceship where Klever announces a knightly challenge to IX. IX does not fight, and a disappointed Alba leaves the spaceship. Klever then attacks the spaceship with his lance and flail and claims victory when it flies off. On the way back to the castle, however, IX appears to answer the challenge, having stolen a horse and weapons from the Green Knight. Using his knowledge of IX's suit, Klever manages to remove it, killing IX, then rides off with Lupo to claim the spaceship.

Boecius revives IX with his last drop of the Elixir, which has the side effect of giving him a glowing effect reminiscent of a halo. Klever and Lupo are unable to control the spaceship, which flies into space on autopilot. Alba dresses IX in Klever's armour and they return to the castle with IX, where she and Boecius give IX credit for defeating the dragon and he is hailed as a saint by the people due to his halo. The Count grants IX the promised reward of Alba's hand in marriage and half his land. Klever and Lupo argue as the spaceship continues to fly uncontrollably through deep space.

== Cast ==
- Klaus Kinski as Boecius
- Harvey Keitel as Klever
- Miguel Bosé as IX
- Fernando Rey as Fray Lupo
- María Lamor as Alba
- José Vivó as Conde
- Julieta Serrano as Clotilde
- José María Pou as Caballero Verde
- Carlos Tristancho as Pregonero
- Santiago Álvarez as Sastre

== Production ==
The film had initially a 200 million pesetas budget, and received an additional 50% subsidy. Eventually the budget had to be raised to 300 million, making for a 400 million total (equal to about $4 million USD, adjusted for inflation), the highest in Spanish cinema at the time.

=== Casting ===
Imanol Arias was initially chosen for the alien's role, and the actor liked the idea, but it was eventually decided that he wasn't suitable for the character. Looking for a more androgynous profile, he was replaced by Miguel Bosé.

For alchemist Boecius the staff was interested in signing a former Hollywood star. The producers successively tried to sign Burt Lancaster, Charlton Heston, Kirk Douglas and Robert Mitchum. An agreement with Vincent Price fell through due to surgery, and his agent offered them Klaus Kinski instead.

=== Filming ===
The film was shot through the province of Girona. The crew was set in Roses, and the Requesens Castle and the volcanic landscape around Olot were used. The shooting is mostly remembered for the tense relationship between Kinski and most of the cast and crew. According to Fernando Colomo, having to wait on a horse for a while angered him for the rest of the entire production and he was disrespectful to everyone except for Miguel Bosé and the Roma people who took care of the animals used in the film.

== Release ==
The film was theatrically released in Spain on 20 December 1985. After the film's theatrical run in its native Spain, CineTel Films picked up the film for a US theatrical release in the summer of 1986. However, the film was not released on videocassette in the US until 1992, when it was released by Vidmark Entertainment.

=== Reception ===
The film was the seventh most attended Spanish film in 1985, far from the box office performance expected to make up for its record budget. The production also resulted in a dispute with the American distributors, which broke off their contract following a delay. Colomo was left with a 50 million pesetas debt that he covered with the gains from his next film, La vida alegre.

== See also ==
- List of Spanish films of 1985
