= El bandido adolescente =

1965 novel written by Ramón J. Sender

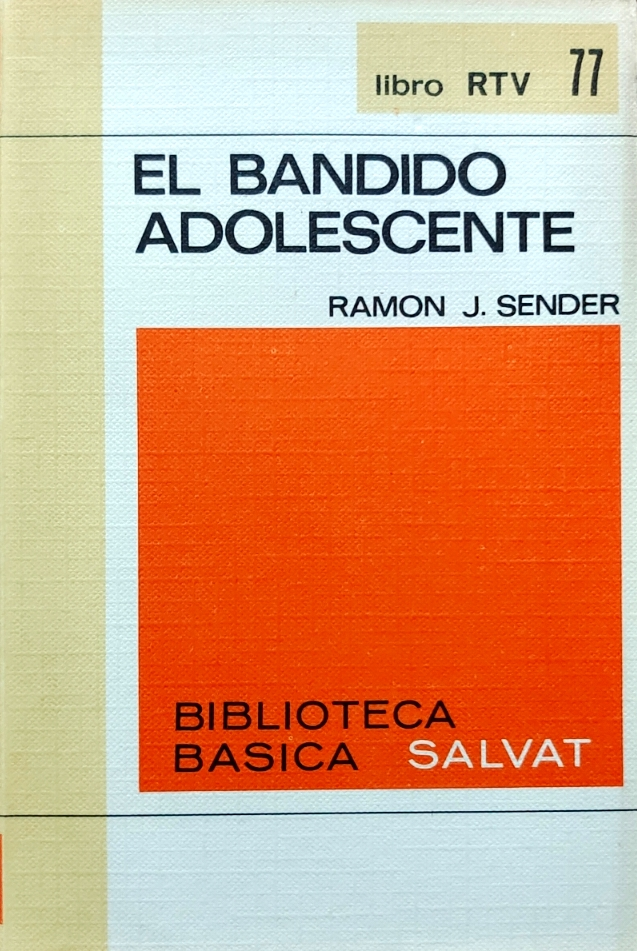
- First edition
- Author: Ramón J. Sender
- Language: Spanish
- Subject: Billy the Kid
- Genre: Western novel
- Publisher: Editorial Destino
- Publication date: 1965
- Pages: 280
- ISBN: 9788423336869

El bandido adolescente (The teenage bandit) is a 1965 novel written by Ramón J. Sender. He wrote it during a tour in New Mexico.

It is about the history of the gunfighter Billy the Kid. In this novel, Ramón J. Sender finds in Billy the Kid a Spanish kinship. He visited Mexico and there someone showed him the purported skull of Billy the Kid.
