= The Man Who Knew Love =

- Original title: El hombre que supo amar
- Directed by: Miguel Picazo
- Screenplay by: Santiago Moncada
- Based on: San Juan de Dios. Una aventura iluminada by José Cruset
- Starring: Timothy Dalton; Antonio Ferrandis; Jonathan Burn; Antonio Mendoza; Queta Claver; Ángela Molina
- Cinematography: Manuel Rojas
- Edited by: Pablo G. del Amo
- Music by: Antonio Pérez Olea
- Production company: General Films Corporations
- Distributed by: Invercine Distribución
- Release date: 10 August 1978
- Country: Spain
- Language: Spanish

The Man Who Knew Love (Spanish: El hombre que supo amar) is a 1976 Spanish biographical film directed by Miguel Picazo which stars Timothy Dalton as John of God alongside Antonio Ferrandis, Jonathan Burn, Antonio Mendoza, Queta Claver and Ángela Molina.

== Plot ==
Set in 16th-century Granada (featuring everyday concerns such as the denouncement of Moriscos and Judaizantes and the limpieza de sangre, as well as the depiction of marginal environments), the plot tracks the life of Juan Ciudad (later known as Juan de Dios) and his struggle against the social, political and religious structures.

== Cast ==
- Timothy Dalton as Juan de Dios
- Antonio Ferrandis as Dr. Cabrales
- Jonathan Burn as Antón Martín
- José M. Prada as Gran Inquisidor
- Alberto de Mendoza as Juan de Ávila
- Queta Claver as Inés
- Antonio Casas as Comisario
- Ángela Molina as Jazmín
- María Paz Molinero as María de Mendoza

== Production ==
Penned by Santiago Moncada, the screenplay is an adaptation of José Cruset's novel San Juan de Dios. Una aventura iluminada. The film is a General Films Corporations production. Filming began in 1976. Shooting locations included Granada.

== Release ==
Distributed by Invercine Distribución, the film was theatrically released in Spain on 10 August 1978.

== Reception ==
The film was not well-received by critics.
