= Mar Saura =

Spanish actress and model (born 1975)

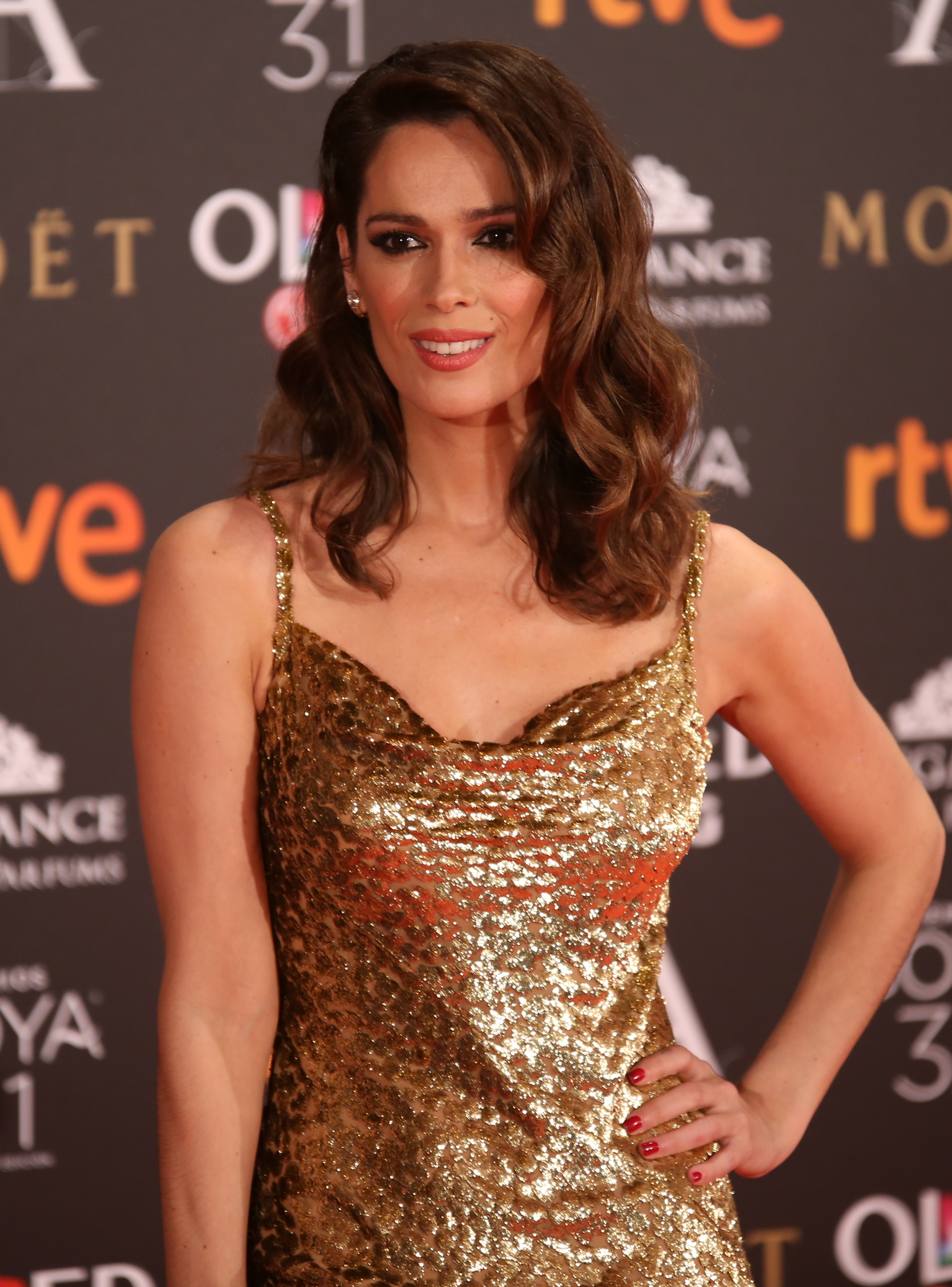
- Mar Saura in 2017
- Born: María del Mar Gómez Saura; 16 October 1975 (age 50); Barcelona, Spain
- Occupations: Actress, model
- Years active: 1992–present
- Spouse: Javier Peral (m. 2005)
- Children: 2
- Website: www.marsaura.net

María del Mar Gómez Saura (born 16 October 1975), commonly known as Mar Saura, is a Spanish actress, model and TV presenter.

== Biography ==
Mar Saura was born in Barcelona, Spain. She won Miss Barcelona in 1992, and competed for Miss Spain.

She began her professional career as a model with Gaudi, Cibeles, and Francina International Modeling Agency, and resided in New York, Milan and Japan.

After her time as a model, she started work as a TV presenter and actress. During this time, she appeared in the series One Two (1998–1999) and acted alongside Lina Morgan on Spanish Television, in addition to having cameos in episodes of other Spanish television series. In her movie career, she created a children's film, King Farm (2002).

Subsequently, she has presented several variety shows such as The Night of Errors (2002) with Josema Yuste; Summer Night (2002) with Bertin Osborne; The Show of Records (2001), with Manu Carreño and collaborated on Full Light (2002) with Pedro Piqueras. She was a contestant on Double (2003) and Call and Win (2003), both on Antena 3, and on Overnight Sensational (2007) on Canal Nou. She appeared in numerous galas on TVE, including the New Year's Eve Specials for 2003, 2004 and 2005, all directed by José Luis Moreno.

Through José Luis Moreno her career as an actress has had a revival since late 2008, when she played Ainhoa, the girlfriend of the lawyer Michael, in Scenes from Marriage on Telecinco.

In Mexico, she participated in the 2010 series Capadocia as Julieta Pusch and Killer Women, being considered part of the Latina movement with Cuban William Levy, posing for Glamour magazine in an Icon Vallarta dress by Dolce & Gabbana.

In 2011, again on Telecinco, she appeared in the series Ángel o demonio as Alexia. She writes a blog at Mujerhoy.com. In April 2013, she began recording AI with Ruben Poveda on Four.

== Filmography ==
Year	Film	Director	Role
2003	El rey de la granja	Gregorio Muro and Carlos Zabala	Mamen
2010	Hidalgo: La historia jamás contada	Antonio Serrano	Marquesa de Villavicencio
2016	La puerta abierta (The Open Door)	Marina Seresesky	Policía Isabel
2018	El mundo es suyo	Alfonso Sánchez	Lorena
2019	¿ Qué te juegas? (Get Her... If You Can)	Inés de León	Interiorista

== TV Series ==
Year	TV Series	Network	Role
1996	Médico de familia	Telecinco	Pepa
1997	La casa de los líos	Antena 3	Dama del amor
2003	Un paso adelante	Antena 3	Mar
2004	Casi perfectos	Antena 3	
2008	Lalola	Antena 3	Miriam
2008	Planta 25	FORTA	Mireia
2008–2009	Escenas de matrimonio	Antena 3	Ainhoa Vidiella
2010	Capadocia	HBO Latin America	Julieta Pusch
2011	Ángel o demonio	Telecinco	Alexia
2014	Cuéntame un cuento	Antena 3	Eva
2014	Los misterios de Laura	TVE	Amanda del Valle
2016	El Ministerio del Tiempo	TVE	Susana Torres

== Awards ==
- Point Radio La Rioja Award for Best Actress in 2011 for fiction series Ángel o demonio.
