= Be Wanton and Tread No Shame =

- Theatrical release poster
- Spanish: Sé infiel y no mires con quién
- Directed by: Fernando Trueba
- Screenplay by: Fernando Trueba
- Based on: Move Over Mrs. Markham by Ray Cooney and John Chapman
- Starring: Ana Belén; Carmen Maura; Antonio Resines; Santiago Ramos; Verónica Forqué; Guillermo Montesinos; Chus Lampreave; "Pirri"; Bibi Andersen
- Cinematography: Juan Amorós
- Edited by: Carmen Frías
- Music by: Ángel Muñoz Alonso
- Production company: Iberoamericana
- Release date: 5 December 1985
- Country: Spain
- Language: Spanish
- Box office: 308 million ₧

Be Wanton and Tread No Shame (Spanish: Sé infiel y no mires con quién) is a 1985 Spanish comedy film directed and written by Fernando Trueba based on the play Move Over Mrs. Markham by Ray Cooney and John Chapman. It stars Ana Belén, Carmen Maura, Antonio Resines, and Santiago Ramos.

== Plot ==
Paco and Fernando, two partners in a small publishing company at a low ebb, seek to seal a deal with popular children literature writer Adela Mora by means of deceit. When they are about the meet with the writer confusion about their extramarital affairs (and about those involving their wives, Carmen and Rosa) erupts.

== Cast ==
- Ana Belén as Rosa
- Carmen Maura as Carmen
- Antonio Resines as Fernando
- Santiago Ramos as Paco
- Verónica Forqué as Silvia
- Guillermo Montesinos as Óscar
- Chus Lampreave as Adela Mora
- "Pirri" as Eulogio
- Bibi Andersen as Raquel

== Production ==
The screenplay is an adaptation of the play Move Over Mrs. Markham by Ray Cooney and John Chapman. The film is an Iberoamericana (Andrés Vicente Gómez) production.

== Release ==
The film was released theatrically on 5 December 1985, grossing 308,205,211 ₧ (1,014,639 admissions). A box-office hit, it proved to be a breakthrough work for Trueba.

== See also ==
- List of Spanish films of 1985
