= Guillermo Montesinos =

Spanish actor (born 1948)

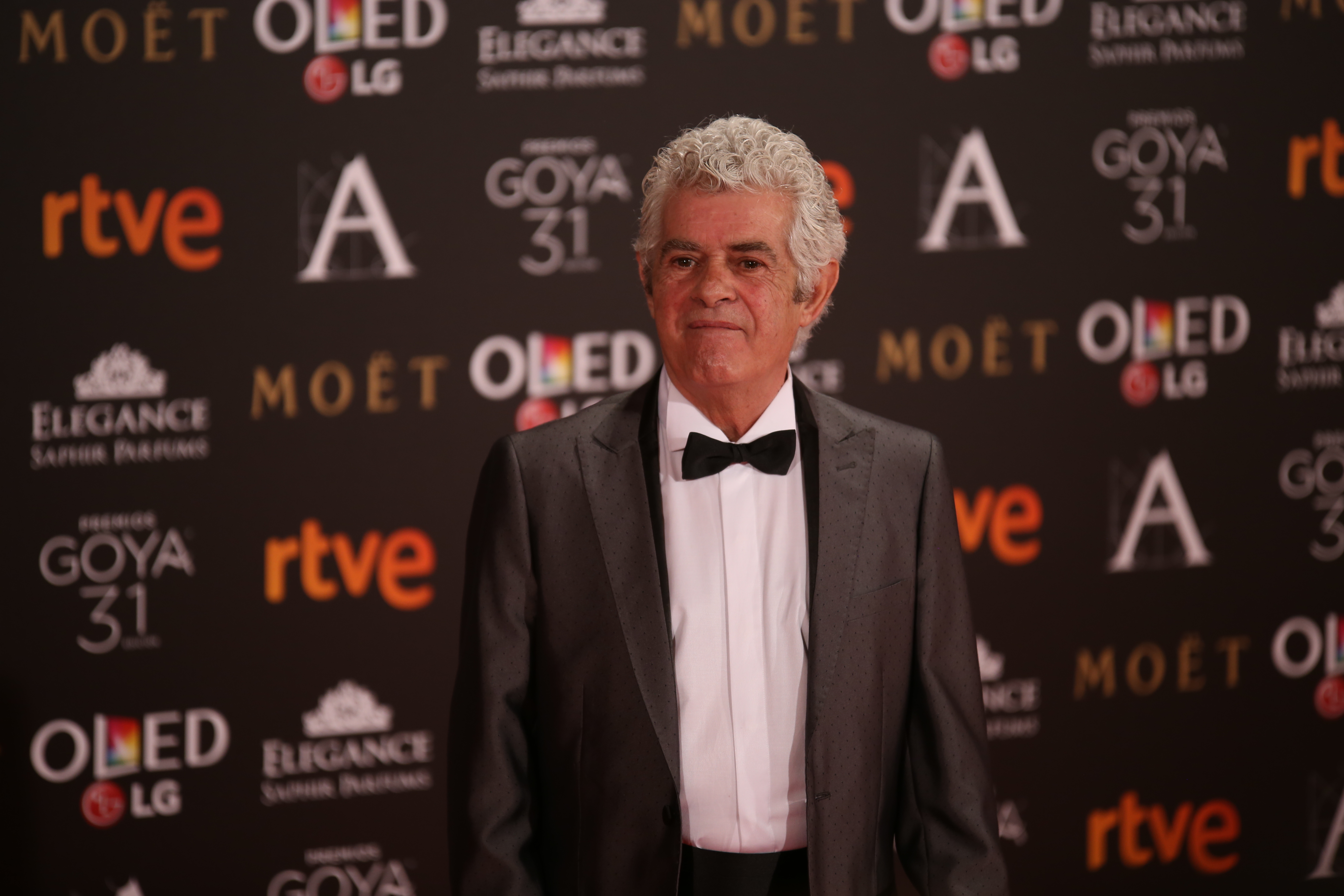
- Montesinos at 30th Goya Awards, 2017
- Born: 10 January 1948 (age 77)
- Occupation: Actor
- Height: 1.56 m (5 ft 1 1/2 in)

Guillermo José "Willy" Montesinos Serrano (born 10 January 1948) is a Spanish actor who has appeared in more than 50 films in his career.

== Biography ==
Montesinos graduated in Dramatic Art in 1969 from Madrid. He made his acting debut in 1975. He went on to appear in successful films like La vaquilla (1984), La vida alegre (1987), Mujeres al borde de un ataque de nervios (1988), the latter of which was directed by Pedro Almodóvar.

His television roles include Pero ¿esto qué es? (1990-1991), Los ladrones van a la oficina (1993-1995) Contigo pan y cebolla (1997).

== Filmography ==
- Viva la vida (2019)
- Tercera Edad - (Cortometraje) (2018)
- Locos por el sexo (2006)
- Rojo sangre (2004)
- París-Tombuctú (1999)
- Todos a la cárcel (1993)
- Supernova (1993)
- El hombre de la nevera (1993)
- Disparate nacional (1990)
- Ni se te ocurra... (1990)
- Si te dicen que caí (1989)
- Amanece, que no es poco (1989)
- Mujeres al borde de un ataque de nervios (1988)
- La vida alegre (1987)
- Sé infiel y no mires con quién (1985)
- La corte de Faraón (1985)
- Luces de bohemia (1985)
- La vaquilla (1985)
- El pico 2 (1984)
- Los zancos (1984)
- Últimas tardes con Teresa (1984)
- Juana la loca... de vez en cuando (1983)
- J.R. contraataca (1983)
- Que nos quiten lo bailao (1983)
- Le llamaban J.R. (1982)
- Buscando a Perico (1982)
- Femenino singular (1982)
- Buenas noches, señor monstruo (1982)
- Las aventuras de Enrique y Ana (1981)
- Gary Cooper, que estás en los cielos (1980)
- El crimen de Cuenca (1980)
- Siete días de enero (1979)
- La Carmen (1976)

== Theatre ==
thumb|El actor Guillermo "Willy" Montesinos. Lista incompleta

- Dinamita (2016-2017)
- Un Enemigo del Pueblo (2015-2016-2017)
- Orquesta Club Virginia (2012)
- Ceniza (2011)
- El extraño viaje (2011)
- El galán fantasma (2010)
- 5 gays.com (2005)
- Que usted lo mate bien (2002)
- Rosa de dos aromas (2002; como director)
- Ay, caray (1999-2000)
- Las obras completas de William Shakespeare (1997)
- Tócala otra vez, Sam! (1989)
- La Reina del Nilo (1986)
- La ilustre fregona (1982)
- De san Pascual a san Gil (1979)

== Television ==
- La mujer de tu vida (1990)
- Los ladrones van a la oficina (1993-1996)
- Tarancón, el quinto mandamiento (2011)
- La que se avecina (2014)
- Cuéntame (2015-2016-2017)
- L'Alqueria Blanca (2007-2010)

== Awards and nominations ==
Year	Awards	Category	Film	Result
1988	Goya Awards	Best Supporting Actor	Mujeres al borde de un ataque de nervios	Nominated
1985	Premios Fotogramas de Plata	Best Supporting Actor	La corte de Faraón; Sé infiel y no mires con quién Luces de bohemia La vaquilla	Nominated
