= Villanueva de los Infantes, Valladolid =

Villanueva de los Infantes
- Municipality
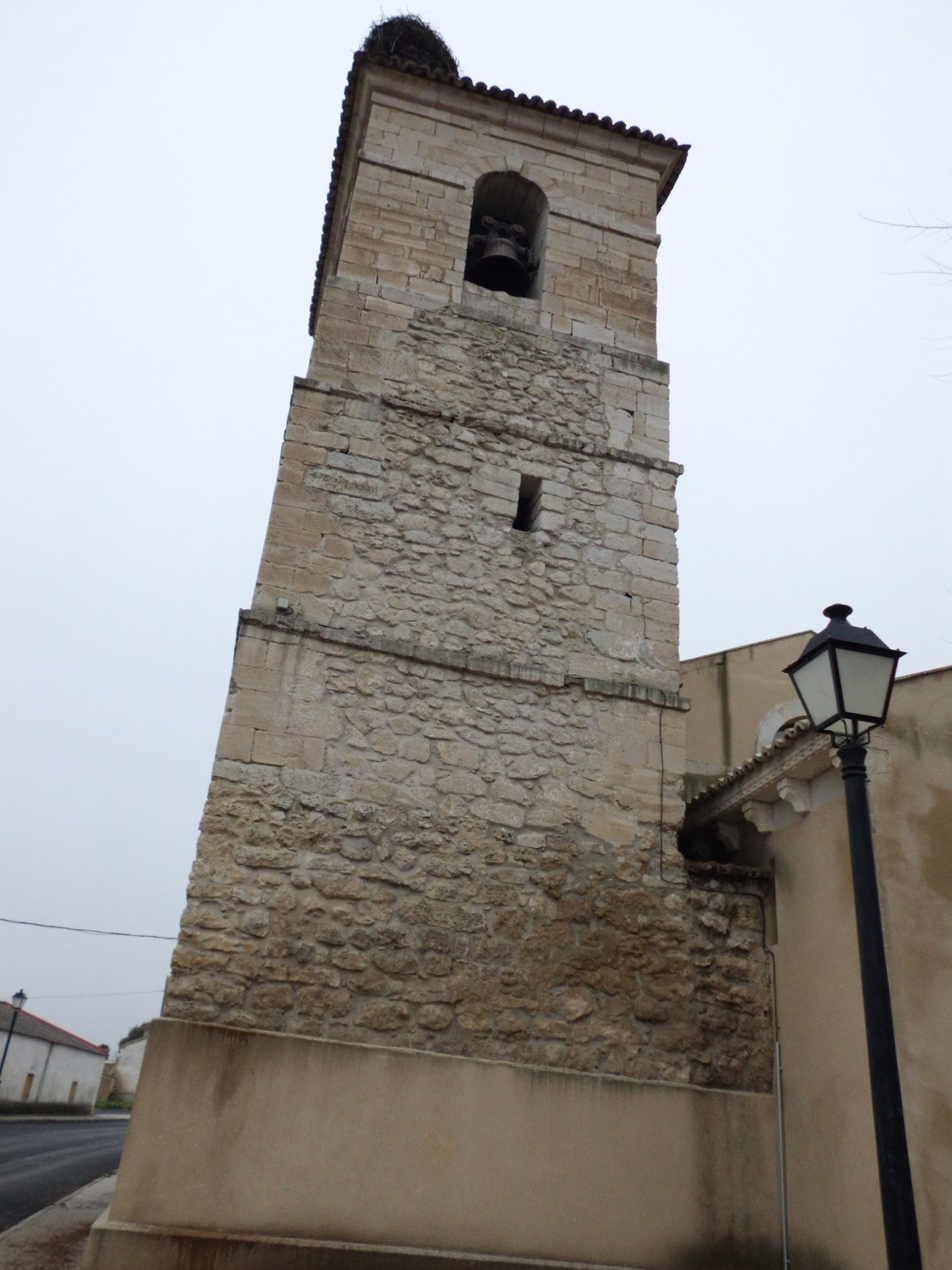

- Location in Spain
- Coordinates: 41°42′8″N 4°29′0″W
- Country: Spain
- Autonomous community: Castile and León
- Province: Valladolid
- Comarca: Páramos del Esgueva

Government
  - Mayor: David Manso Rodríguez

Area
  - Total: 19.2 km^{2} (7.4 sq mi)
- Elevation: 738 m (2,421 ft)

Population (2025-01-01)
  - Total: 116
  - Density: 6.04/km^{2} (15.6/sq mi)
- Time zone: UTC+1 (CET)
  - Summer (DST): UTC+2 (CEST)
- Postal code: 47174

Villanueva de los Infantes is a municipality in the province of Valladolid, Castile and León, Spain. As of 2024, the population was 112.
