= Caroline Grimm =

Singer, actress, and writer

Caroline Grimm is a French screenwriter, actress, producer and director. She published her first book, Moi, Olympe de Gouges, a biography, in 2009. Adapted to the theater, her work proved to be a big hit. Her second book, Churchill m’a menti (Flammarion, 2014), was widely acclaimed by critics.
