= La vida alegre =

- Theatrical release poster
- Directed by: Fernando Colomo
- Written by: Fernando Colomo
- Starring: Veronica Forqué; Antonio Resines; Ana Obregón; Guillermo Montesinos; Massiel; Miguel Rellán
- Cinematography: Javier Salmones
- Production company: El Catalejo P.C.
- Distributed by: Iberoamericana Films Producción
- Release date: 14 April 1987
- Country: Spain
- Language: Spanish
- Budget: 95 million ₧
- Box office: 260 million ₧

La vida alegre is a 1987 Spanish comedy film directed and written by Fernando Colomo. It stars Veronica Forqué, Antonio Resines, Ana Obregón, Guillermo Montesinos, Massiel and Miguel Rellán.

== Plot ==
Ana is a doctor. Against the opinion of her husband, Antonio, also a doctor, she starts working at a centre of venereal diseases. There, she meets eccentric people from the lower strata of the society.

== Cast ==
- Verónica Forqué as Ana
- Antonio Resines as Antonio
- Miguel Rellán as Eduardo
- Massiel as Rosi
- Guillermo Montesinos as Manolo
- Ana Obregón as Carolina
- Gloria Muñoz as Elvira
- José Antonio Navarro as Javi
- Itziar Álvarez as Cata
- Alicia Sánchez as Marta
- Rafaela Aparicio as Vecina I
- Chus Lampreave as Vecina II
- El Gran Wyoming as Federico
- Paloma Catalán as Mari Carmen
- Javier Gurruchaga as Ildefonso
- Gabriel Latorre as Periodista

== Production ==
La vida alegre was written by the director Fernando Colomo, who took inspiration on the experiences of his sister Concepción, a doctor specialist in dermatology and venereology. The film was produced by El Catalejo P.C. Shot in Madrid from November to December 1986, shooting locations included the Centro District. Javier Salmones worked as director of photography. The scored was performed by the band Suburbano. The total budget amounted to around 95 million ₧.

== Release ==
Distributed by Iberoamericana Films Producción, the film premiered on 14 April 1987. It grossed 826,788 viewers and a revenue of 260 million ₧.

== Awards and nominations ==
Year	Award	Category	Nominee(s)	Result	Ref.
1988	2nd Goya Awards	Best Actress	Verónica Forqué	Won	

== See also ==
- List of Spanish films of 1987
