= Outside the Walls =

- Theatrical release poster
- Spanish: Extramuros
- Directed by: Miguel Picazo
- Screenplay by: Miguel Picazo
- Based on: Extramuros by Jesús Fernández Santos
- Starring: Carmen Maura; Mercedes Sampietro; Aurora Bautista; Assumpta Serna; Antonio Ferrandis
- Cinematography: Teo Escamilla
- Music by: José Nieto
- Production companies: Blau Films; Miguel Picazo PC
- Distributed by: Incine
- Release dates: September 1985 (Zinemaldia); 27 September 1985 (Spain)
- Country: Spain
- Language: Spanish

Outside the Walls (Spanish: Extramuros) is a 1985 Spanish drama film directed by Miguel Picazo based on the novel by Jesús Fernández Santos which stars Carmen Maura and Mercedes Sampietro.

== Plot ==
Set during the reign of Philip II, the plot follows two nuns bonded by Lesbian affection (sor Ana and sor Ángela). With help from Ana, Ángela decides to fake stigmata to save her convent from economic hardship. These developments raise the prioress' suspicions and eventually the Holy Office intervenes.

== Cast ==
- Carmen Maura as sor Ana
- Mercedes Sampietro as sor Ángela
- Aurora Bautista as priora
- Assumpta Serna as huésped
- Antonio Ferrandis as médico
- Manuel Alexandre as sacerdote
- Conrado San Martín as duque
- Marta Fernández as doncella

== Production ==
The film was produced by Blau Films and Miguel Picazo PC, and it had the participation of TVE. Shooting locations included the convent of San Pedro de Dueñas (province of Segovia), Talamanca de Jarama, Peñaranda de Duero, Ávila, and Alcalá de Henares.

== Release ==
The film screened at the 33rd San Sebastián International Film Festival in September 1985. Distributed by Incine, the film was released theatrically at Madrid's Palacio de la Música on 27 September 1985. It had 156,158 admissions.

== Reception ==
Clifford Terry of Chicago Tribune considered that Picazo managed to create a "bizarre, uneven but strangely compelling" film.

Ángel Fernández-Santos of El País assessed that upon translation into images of the literary story the film "suffers from a multitude of defects that gradually become visible", and by the time the film ends, the latter "is difficult to sustain" "due to the accumulation [of those deffects].

== See also ==
- List of Spanish films of 1985
