= Miguel Picazo =

Spanish film director (1927–2016)

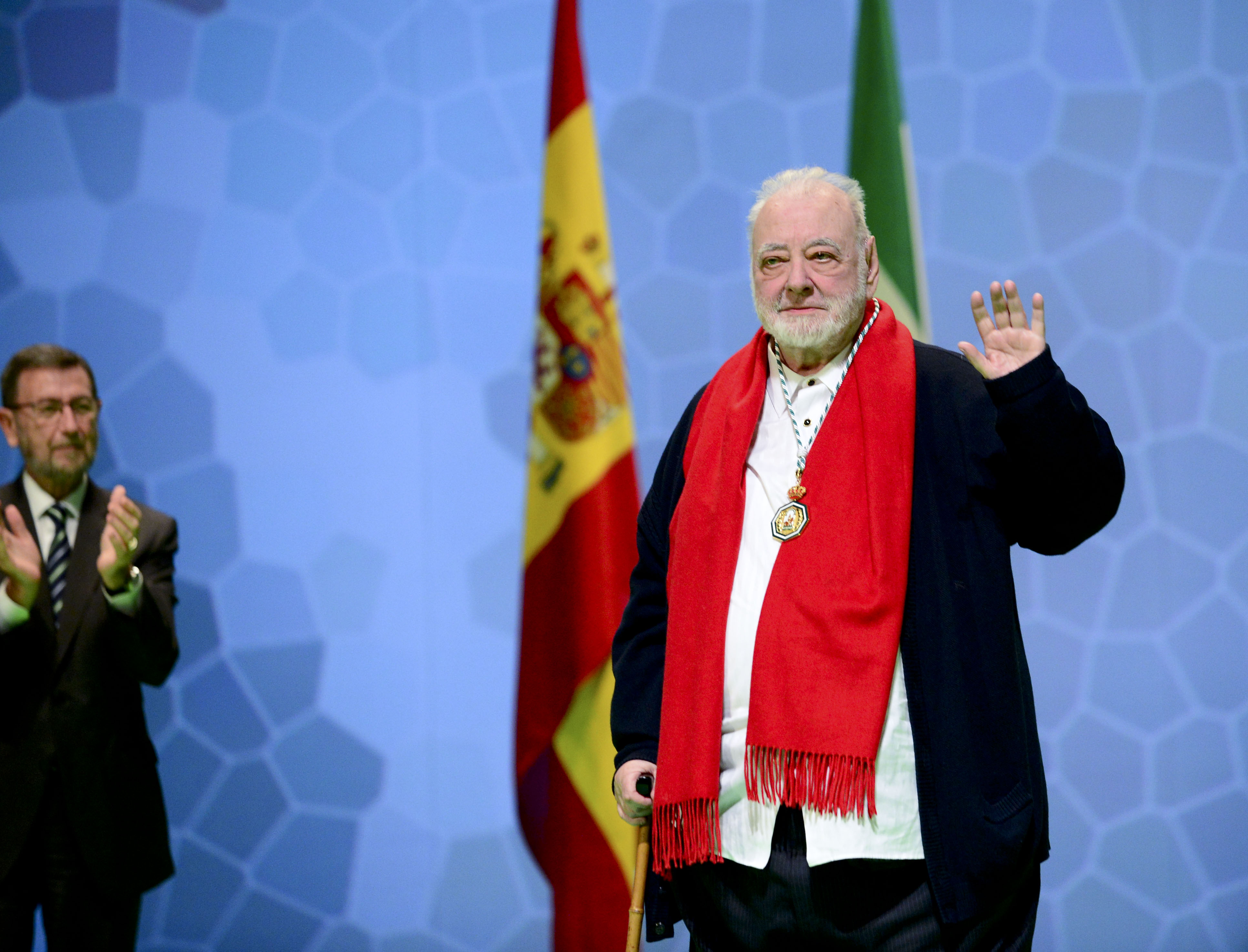
- Born: Miguel Picazo de Dios; 27 March 1927; Cazorla (Jaén), Spain
- Died: 23 April 2016 (aged 89); Guarromán (Jaén), Spain
- Occupations: Film director Actor
- Years active: 1960–1997

Miguel Picazo de Dios (27 March 1927 – 23 April 2016) was a Spanish film director, screenwriter and actor. He is best known for his first feature film La tía Tula (Aunt Tula) (1964).

== Career ==
Born in Cazorla (Jaén), Picazo was raise in Guadalajara and studied law. Interested in filmmaking, he entered Spain's national film school, Intituto de investigaciones y Experiencias Cinematográficas, graduating as director in 1960 with a practice film entitled Habitación de alquiler (Rented Room). He then became a teacher in the newly restructured Escuela Oficial de Cine (EOC) and eventually he was able to direct his first film, La tía Tula (Aunt Tula) (1964). An updated adaptation of the well known novel by Miguel de Unamuno, portraying the oppressive and puritanical environment of provincial life in Spain. The film, helped by a strong performance in the lead by Aurora Bautista as the sexually repressed title character, was a critical and commercial success and brought Picazo to the forefront of the new Spanish cinema.

Despite the success of his debut film, it took Picazo three years to make his second film, Oscuros sueños de agosto (Dark dreams of August) (1967), a film marred by cuts by the censors and the death of the film's producer, Cesáreo González which hampered commercial distribution. This failure put Picazo away from filming for the next nine years.

Meanwhile, Picazo devoted his creative energy to scripting and directing a series of short films for Spanish television, including children's films and adaptations of literary works, making more than seventy programs for Spanish television. He returned to directing with El hombre que supo amar (The Man Who Knew Love) (1976) a biopic of John of God that was produced by the saint's religious order which also backed the film's distribution. Nevertheless El hombre que supo amar fared poorly commercially. Picazo's fourth film, (Los claros motivos del deseo) (The clear motives of Desire) (1976), about adolescence life in the provinces, fared no better at the box office. This new commercial failure brought the director back to his work on television until, thanks to the Miró's law, he was able to shoot his fifth film Extramuros (Outside the walls) (1985), adapted from the novel of the same name by Jesús Fernández Santos. The film, starring Aurora Bautista as tyrannical mother superior of a convent of sexually repressed nuns whose authority is challenged by two younger women, played by Mercedes Sampietro and Carmen Maura. Extramuros became Picazo's last film.

Besides being a film director, Picazo played some small roles as an actor in few films, most notably in Víctor Erice's The Spirit of the Beehive (1973) and Alejandro Amenábar's Thesis (Tesis) (1996). After his retirement, Picazo was a juror in many film festivals and received an Honorary Goya Award for his life’s work in 1997.

== Filmography as director ==
Year	English title	Original title	Notes
1964	Aunt Tula	La tía Tula	Based on the eponymous novel by Miguel de Unamuno: Best Spanish Language Film and best director at the San Sebastián International Film Festival.
1967	Dark dreams of August	Oscuros sueños de agosto	
1976	The Man Who Knew Love	El hombre que supo amar	
1976	The clear motives of desire	Los claros motivos del deseo	
1985	Outside the Walls	Extramuros	Based on a novel by Jesús Fernández Santos
