= Ramón J. Sender =

Spanish writer

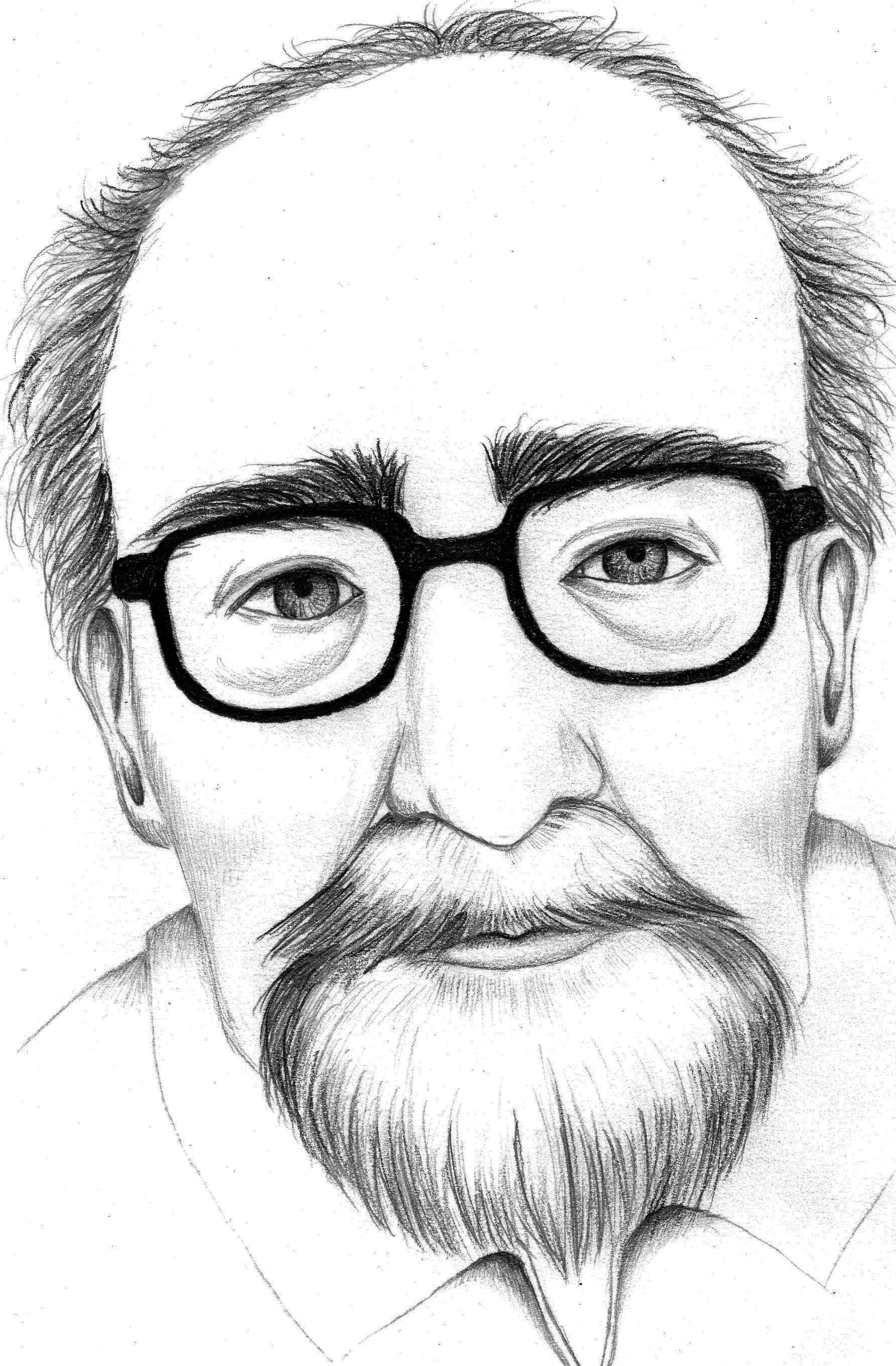
- Born: Ramón José Sender Garcés; 3 February 1901; Chalamera, Spain
- Died: 16 January 1982 (aged 80); San Diego, U.S.
- Citizenship: American
- Occupation: Professor
- Writing career
- Language: Spanish
- Movement: Post-Spanish Civil War literature

Ramón José Sender Garcés (3 February 1901 – 16 January 1982) was a Spanish novelist, essayist and journalist. Several of his works were translated into English by the distinguished zoologist, Sir Peter Chalmers Mitchell, including Seven Red Sundays (Siete domingos rojos), Mr Witt Among the Rebels (Mr Witt en el cantón) and The War in Spain (Contraataque). He published articles in the Valencia-based Orto magazine between 1932 and 1934. During the Spanish Civil War Sender was among the contributors of El Mono Azul, a Republican literary magazine.

The Civil War had a profound and lasting impact on Sender. He served as an officer in the Spanish Republican Army, and the nationalists killed his wife – Amparo Barayón. His work Contraataque was based on his military experience and aimed to garner support for the Republicans.

Following Francisco Franco's victory in the Spanish Civil War, Sender went into exile, first settling in Mexico before moving to the United States, where he became a U.S. citizen in 1946. In the United States, he built a long career as a professor of Spanish literature at various universities, primarily in Albuquerque and San Diego.

He temporarily returned to Spain when Franco was on his deathbed, and his return caused a stir in his homeland. However, the permanent residence in Spain, which Sender had longed for and spoken so much about, never came to fruition. Sender died in San Diego in 1982.

== Family ==
Sender had a few children. Two of them, Ramón Sender Barayón and Andrea Sender Barayón, were born to Sender and his first wife, Amparo Barayón.

Ramón Sender Barayón became a composer and writer. After his father's death, he traveled to Spain to investigate the circumstances of his mother's murder. His investigation resulted in the book Muerte en Zamora (A Death in Zamora), published in the United States in 1989 and in Spain the following year.

Andrea was six months old when her mother was imprisoned in 1936 and remained with her during her imprisonment. Following Barayón's death, Andrea and her brother were placed in an orphanage before being transferred to the French border under the auspices of the Red Cross and reunited with their father in Bayonne in January 1937. Andrea later became an Anglican nun under the name Sister Benedicta. She subsequently returned to Zamora to visit her mother's grave and met Eduardo Poveda, the bishop of Zamora, who asked forgiveness of Andrea and her family for harm caused to them by the Church.

== Publications ==
=== In Spanish ===
- Imán (1930)
- Siete domingos rojos (1932)
- Mr. Witt en el cantón (1935)
- Contraataque (1937)
- El lugar de un hombre (1939)
- Mexicayotl (1940)
- Crónica del alba (1942)
- La esfera (1947)
- El rey y la reina (1949) (Originally published in 1948 in English)
- El verdugo afable (1952)
- Mosén Millán (1953) (republished later in 1960 renamed as Requiem por un campesino español)
- Bizancio (1956)
- La tesis de Nancy (1962)
- El bandido adolescente (1965)
- La aventura equinoccial de Lope de Aguirre (1968)

=== In English translation ===
- Earmarked for Hell (1934, England); original Spanish: Imán
- Pro Patria (1935, U.S.); original Spanish: Imán
- Mr. Witt Among the Rebels (1937); original Spanish: Mr. Witt en el cantón
- Seven Red Sundays (1938); original Spanish: Siete domingos rojos
- The War in Spain: A Personal Narrative (1937); original Spanish: Contraataque
- Chronicle of Dawn (1945); original Spanish: Crónica del alba
- The King and the Queen (1948)
- Requiem for a Spanish Peasant (1960); original Spanish: Requiem por un campesino español
- The Affable Hangman (1964); original Spanish: El verdugo afable
