= Marisa Porcel =

Spanish actress (1943–2018)

- Born: 15 November 1943; Tarazona (Zaragoza), Spain
- Died: 15 August 2018 (aged 74); Madrid, Spain
- Occupation: Actress
- Years active: 1963–2013

María Luisa Porcel Montijano (15 November 1943 – 15 August 2018) was a Spanish stage, film and television actress.

== Selected filmography ==
- The Garden of Delights (1970)
- Habla, mudita (1973)
- Spanish Fly (1975)
- Black Litter (1977)
- La moglie in bianco... l'amante al pepe (1980)

== Bibliography ==
- Cowie, Peter. International Film Guide 1978. Tantivy Press, 1977.
