= Mary Carmen Ramírez =

Spanish actress and singer

María del Carmen Ramírez
- Born: 4 September 1932 (age 94); Granada, Spain
- Occupations: Actress and singer
- Spouse: Francisco Saura Moreno

María del Carmen Ramírez, better known as Mary Carmen Ramírez (born 4 September 1932) is a Spanish actress and mezzo-soprano singer. She is best known for her film Belle Epoque (1992), for which she was nominated for Goya Award for Best Supporting Actress. She appeared in several theatre plays and television series, including Escenas de Matrimonio.

== Career ==
=== Films ===
Mary started her acting career in 1985 with the film La corte de Faraón, directed by José Luis García Sánchez. Later on she starred in films like Las cosas del querer (1989), Una mujer bajo la lluvia (1992) and la oscarizada. Belle Époque (1992) film became the best work in her career for which she earned the nomination of Goya Award for Best Supporting Actress.

=== Television ===
Mary has also appeared in a number of Television series. Her list of works in Television follows as such:

- Tercera planta, inspección fiscal (1991) en TVE.
- Los ladrones van a la oficina (1993–1994) on Antena 3.
- Aquí hay negocio (1995) on TVE.
- A las once en casa (1998–1999) on TVE.
- Ellas son así (1999) on Telecinco.
- ¡Ala… Dina! (2000–2002) on TVE.
- Capital (2004)
- Escenas de matrimonio (2007–2008) on Telecinco.

=== Theatre ===
She appeared in the theatre drama Los cuernos de don Friolera, directed by José Tamayo. She also appeared in another theatre drama Que viene mi marido (2000).
