= Club Virginia Orchestra =

- Film poster
- Spanish: Orquesta Club Virginia
- Directed by: Manuel Iborra
- Screenplay by: Manuel Iborra; Joaquín Oristrell
- Starring: Jorge Sanz; Antonio Resines; Santiago Ramos; Enrique San Francisco; Emma Suárez; Juan Echanove; Pau Riba; Torrebruno; Natasha Hovey
- Cinematography: Javier Salmones
- Edited by: Miguel A. Santamaría
- Music by: Santi Arisa
- Production companies: El Catalejo PC; Fernando Colomo PC
- Distributed by: Warner Española
- Release date: 11 September 1992
- Country: Spain
- Language: Spanish

Club Virginia Orchestra (Spanish: Orquesta Club Virginia) is a 1992 Spanish comedy film directed by Manuel Iborra from a screenplay he co-wrote with Joaquín Oristrell. It stars Jorge Sanz, Antonio Resines, Santiago Ramos, Enrique San Francisco, Emma Suárez, and Juan Echanove.

== Plot ==
Inspired by the life of Santi Arisa and set in 1967, the plot follows the plight of a Spanish provincial orchestra touring in the Middle East during the Six Day War.

== Cast ==
- Jorge Sanz as Tony
- Antonio Resines as Sr. Domènech
- Santiago Ramos as el Negro
- Enrique San Francisco as Curt
- Emma Suárez as María
- Juan Echanove as el Maño
- Pau Riba as Solimán
- Verónica Forqué as presentadora TV egipcia
- Rocco Torrebruno as Enzo
- Silke Hornillos
- Natasha Hovey

== Production ==
Shooting locations in Morocco included Marrakesh, Taroudant, Tangier, and Tétouan.

== Release ==
The film was released theatrically in Spain on 11 September 1992.

== Accolades ==
Year	Award	Category	Nominee(s)	Result	Ref.
1993	7th Goya Awards	Best Supporting Actor	Enrique San Francisco	Nominated	
1993	7th Goya Awards	Best Sound	Julio Recuero, Gilles Ortion, Enrique Molinero, José Antonio Bermúdez	Won	

== See also ==
- List of Spanish films of 1992
