= Antonio Resines =

Spanish actor (born 1954)

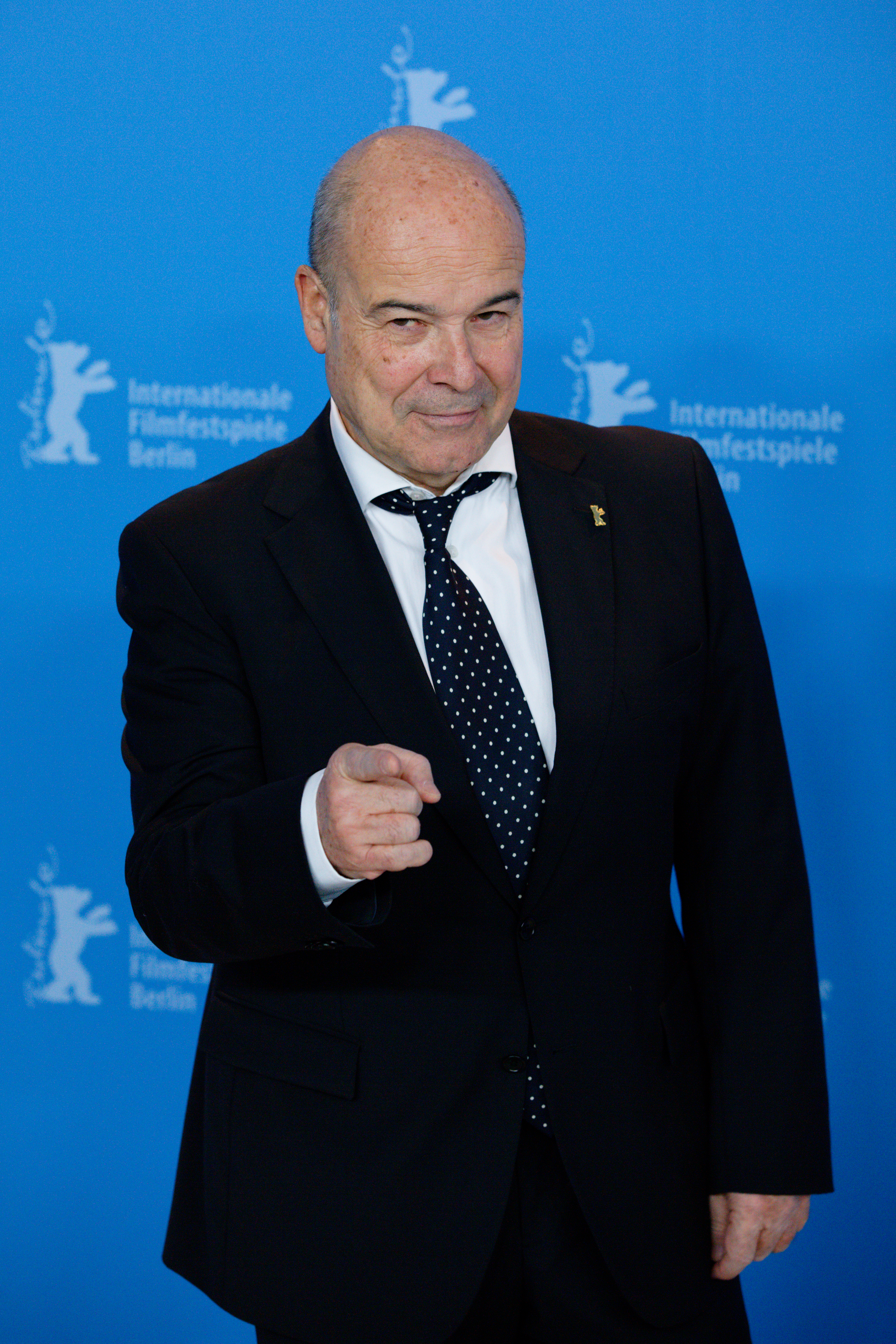
- Resines in 2017
- Born: Antonio Cayetano Francisco de Sales Fernández Resines; 7 August 1954 (age 72); Torrelavega, Spain
- Occupation: Actor

Antonio Fernández Resines (born 7 August 1954) is a Spanish film and television actor.

Resines made his feature film debut in 1980 in La paloma azul, also featuring in Opera prima and La mano negra. He gained early notoriety in the 1980s by featuring in titles such as Be Wanton and Tread No Shame (1985), La vida alegre (1987) and Dawn Breaks, Which Is No Small Thing (1989). He further consolidated a film and television career in the 1990s, primarily in comedy works, including pictures such as Disparate nacional (1990), Anything for Bread (1991), The Sow (1992), Acción mutante (1993), Everyone Off to Jail (1993) and All Men Are the Same (1994) and series such as Colegio Mayor and Los ladrones van a la oficina, which earned him notoriety. He nonetheless won the Goya Award for Best Actor for a dramatic role in The Lucky Star (1997).

He attained an enormous degree of popularity in Spain for his portrayal of Diego Serrano from 2003 to 2008 in television series Los Serrano.

== Biography ==
Antonio Cayetano Francisco de Sales (his full compound given name) Fernández Resines was born 'by accident' on 7 August 1954 in Torrelavega, as his parents spent their Summer holidays there, but he was raised in Madrid, son of José Ramón Fernández Quevedo, lawyer, and Amalia Resines Ruiz de Rebolledo, who died on 10 July 2011. He studied on the Marianist Colegio Santa María del Pilar.

Resines started studying law at university, yet he dropped his studies after one year, switching to 'Sciences of the Image'. During this time, he became an acquaintance of the likes of Fernando Trueba and Óscar Ladoire.

From 2003 to 2008, he starred as leading role (Diego Serrano) in the successful (yet controversially-ended) costumbrista sit-com Los Serrano.

From 2015 to 2016, he served as president of the Academy of Cinematographic Arts and Sciences of Spain.

He was a regular collaborator in La Resistencia. In September 2019, he joined El hormiguero.

== Selected filmography ==
=== Film ===
Year	Title	Role	Notes	Ref.
1980	Ópera prima (Opera prima)	León		
1982	La colmena	Pepe "El Astilla"		
1985	Sé infiel y no mires con quién (Be Wanton and Tread No Shame)	Fernando		
1987	La vida alegre	Antonio		
1987	Luna de lobos (Wolves' Moon)	Ángel		
1987	Moros y cristianos (Moors and Christians)	Olivares		
1988	El juego más divertido (The Most Amusing Game)	Tomás		
1988	Pasodoble	Topero		
1989	Amanece, que no es poco (Dawn Breaks, Which Is No Small Thing)	Teodoro		
1989	El vuelo de la paloma (The Flight of the Dove)	Toñito		
1990	Disparate nacional	Renedo		
1991	Cómo ser mujer y no morir en el intento	Antonio		
1991	Todo por la pasta (Anything for Bread)	Angel		
1992	Orquesta Club Virginia (Club Virginia Orchestra)	Sr. Domènech		
1992	La marrana (The Sow)	Ruy Domínguez		
1993	Acción mutante	Ramón Yarritu		
1993	Tocando fondo	Andrés de Granada		
1993	Todos a la cárcel (Everyone Off to Jail)	Mariano		
1994	Todos los hombres sois iguales (All Men Are the Same)	Manolo		
1994	Cómo ser infeliz y disfrutarlo	Antonio		
1994	Amor propio	Enrique Miranda		
1995	Sálvate si puedes	Ministro		
1995	Los hombres siempre mienten	Aitor		
1996	Calor... y celos	Álvaro		
1997	Tranvía a la Malvarrosa (Tramway to Malvarrosa)	Semo		
1997	El tiempo de la felicidad (Time of Happiness)	Fernando		
1997	La buena estrella (Lucky Star)	Rafael		
1997	Carreteras secundarias (Backroads)	Lozano		
1998	Entre todas las mujeres	Enbeita		
1998	Una pareja perfecta (A Perfect Couple)	Lorenzo		
1998	La niña de tus ojos (The Girl of Your Dreams)	Blas Fontiveros		
1999	Pepe Guindo	El vibrafonista		
2000	El portero (The Goalkeeper)	Sargento Andrade		
2001	Marujas asesinas (Killer Housewives)	Felipe		
2002	El embrujo de Shangai (The Shanghai Spell)	El Kim		
2002	X	Javier		
2002	La caja 507 (Box 507)	Modesto Pardo		
2003	Al sur de Granada (South from Granada)	Don Virgilio		
2003	El oro de Moscú (Moscow Gold)	Jacinto		
2003	Dos tipos duros (Two Tough Guys)	Paco		
2005	Otros días vendrán (Other Days Will Come)	Luis		
2006	La dama boba (The Idiot Maiden)	Maestro de letras		
2009	Celda 211 (Cell 211)	Utrilla		
2018	Ola de crímenes (Crime Wave)	Andoni		
2020	Orígenes secretos (Unknown Origins)	Cosme		
2023	El hotel de los líos. García y García 2	Alberto Flecha		
2023	De Caperucita a loba (Little Red Riding Wolf)	Ramiro		
2023	Ocho apellidos marroquís (A Moroccan Affair)	José María		
2024	Verano en diciembre (Family Affairs)	Don Ramón		
2024	Un lío de millones	Agustín		
2025	Mikaela	Leo		
2025	Un funeral de locos	Imanol		
2025	La cena (The Dinner)	Antón		
2026	Haciendo amigos	Antonio		

- The Unemployment Club (2021) as Mr. Luna
- La pequeña Suiza (2019) as Pascual
- El mundo alrededor (Alejandro Calvo-Sotelo, 2005).
- Tánger (Juan Madrid, 2004).
- Trileros (Antonio del Real, 2003).
- Besos de gato (Rafael Alcázar, 2003).
- Pídele cuentas al Rey (Jose Antonio Quirós, 1999).
- La Ley de la frontera (Adolfo Aristarain, 1995).
- El baile del pato (Manuel Iborra, 1989).
- Lulú de noche (Emilio Martínez Lázaro, 1986).
- Sal gorda (Fernando Trueba, 1983).
- Vecinos (Alberto Bermejo, 1981).

=== Television ===
- Eva y Adán: agencia matrimonial (1990–1991)
- Los ladrones van a la oficina (1993-1996)
- La banda de Pérez (1997)
- A las once en casa (1998–1999)
- Robles Investigador (2000-2001)
- Los Serrano (2003–2008)
- Cheers (2011-)
- Aquí Paz y después Gloria (2015) as Paco / Ángel

== Accolades ==
Year	Award	Category	Work	Result	Ref.
1998	12th Goya Awards	Best Actor	Lucky Star	Won	
1999	13th Goya Awards	Best Actor	The Girl of Your Dreams	Nominated	
2010	24th Goya Awards	Best Supporting Actor	Cell 211	Nominated	

Academic offices
Preceded by Enrique González Macho	President of the Academy of Cinematographic Arts and Sciences of Spain; 2015–2016	Succeeded by Yvonne Blake
