= Requiem for a Spanish Peasant =

1953 novel by Ramón J. Sender

- Author: Ramón J. Sender
- Original title: Requiem por un campesino español
- Working title: Mosén Millán
- Language: Spanish
- Genre: Short novel
- Published: 1953
- Publication place: Spain
- Media type: Print

Requiem for a Spanish Peasant (Réquiem por un campesino español) is a short novel in twentieth-century Spanish literature by Spanish writer Ramón J. Sender. It conveys the thoughts and memories of Mosén Millán, a Catholic parish priest, as he sits in the vestry of a church in a nameless Aragonese village, preparing to conduct a requiem mass to celebrate the life of a young peasant named Paco killed by the Nationalist army a year earlier, at the outbreak of the Spanish Civil War. As he waits, his thoughts are interrupted by the occasional comings and goings of an altar boy, who hums to himself an anonymous ballad.

The novel was originally published under the title Mosén Millán; however, the author changed the title to shift the focus from the priest to its peasant protagonist.

== Plot summary ==
The story is narrated by a third-person omniscient narrator who has insight into Mosén Millán's thoughts and feelings. Three distinct planes of narration exist in the novel: the present, Millán's recollections of his relationship with Paco from birth to death, and the ballad the altar boy sings which recounts Paco's life.

In the present, Millán, fatigued, prays as he awaits the requiem mass with recollections of Paco's life. As he prays he rests his head against a wall—a habit—which bears a dark spot. The altar boy comes and goes and both remark on the lack of people attending mass. Millán, feeling guilty knowing that he played a role in Paco's death, asks the altar boy to leave the church to look for mass attenders in the town square when the altar boy sings the parts of the ballad that refer to Millán.

== Characters ==
- Mosén Millán
- The altar boy ('El monaguillo')
- Paco, the young peasant
- Águeda, Paco's wife
- Don Gumersindo
- Don Valeriano
- Cástulo Pérez
- La Jerónima, the midwife
- The shoemaker ('El zapatero')

== Symbols ==
- The dark spot
- Mosén Millán's fatigue
- Owls
- Partridges - Since Don Juan Manuel's Tales of Count Lucanor, partridges have served in Spanish literature as symbols of deceit. In El Conde Lucanor itself they mark a necromancer's deception of a clergyman wishing to advance his career within the church. The necromancer offers the clergyman a dinner of partridges and promptly hypnotizes him into believing he ascends to the papacy in a matter of a few years. Therefore, partridges in this story may symbolize Millán's untrustworthiness, or his weakness in the face of persuasion, as we observe that Millán betrays almost unwittingly with a slight nod of the head.
- Larks
- The colt
- The cave
- "Cojones" (slang, "testicles") - La Jerónima's dialogue informs us that she knows based on changing Paco's diapers in his infancy that he is endowed with unusually large testicles, symbols of his masculinity and his courage. These sharply contrast with Millán's weak character.

== Film ==
In 1985, Spanish film director Francesc Betriu adapted the novel into a film of the same name, starring Antonio Banderas as Paco. The film was nominated for the Golden Lion at the 42nd Venice International Film Festival.
