= Santiago Ramos (actor) =

Spanish actor (born 1949)

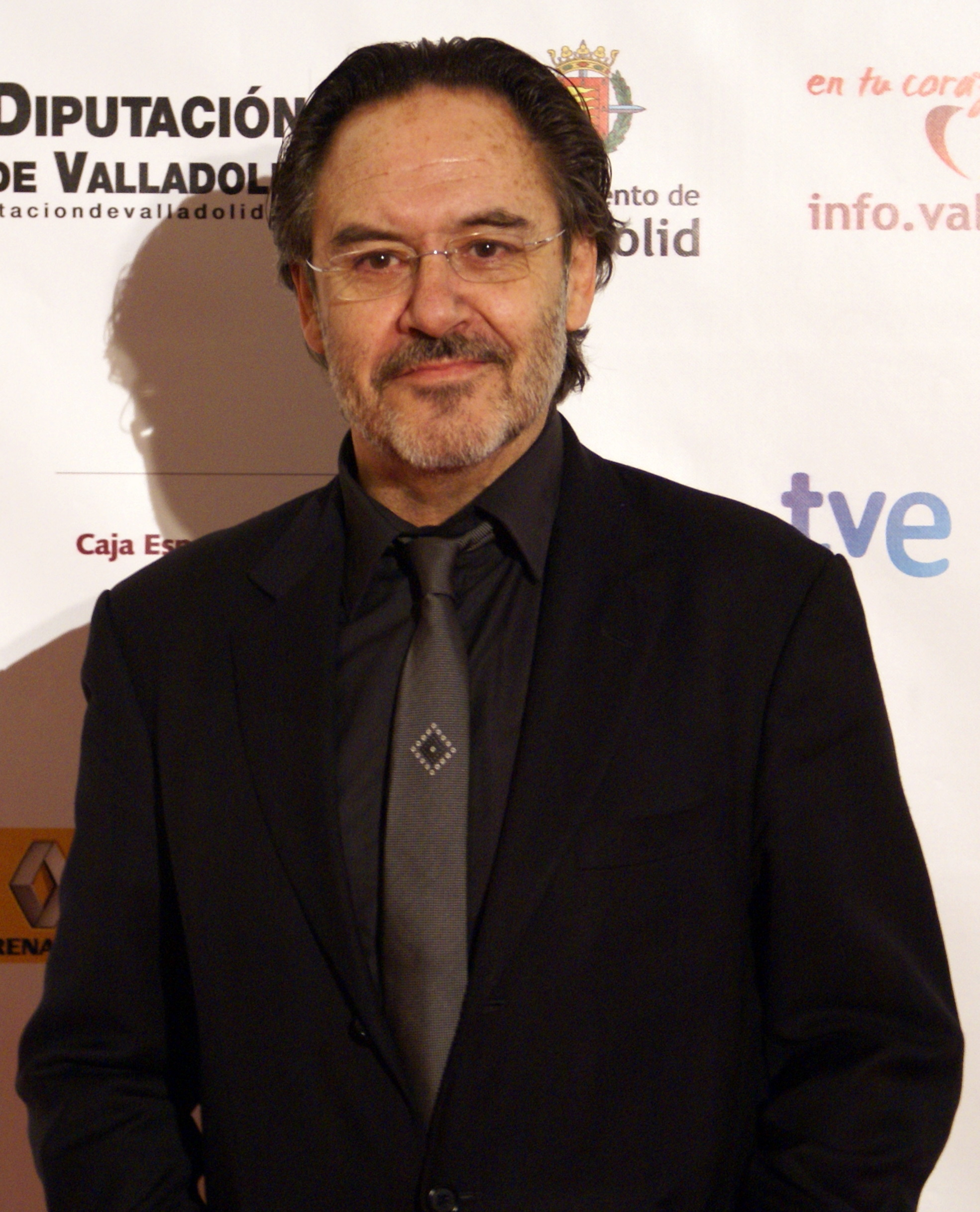
- At the 2011 Seminci
- Born: 1 August 1949 (age 76); Boadilla, Spain
- Occupation: Actor

Santiago Ramos (born 1 August 1949) is a Spanish actor. He won the Goya Award for Best Actor for his performance in Como un relámpago (1996).

He became popular to a wide television audience for his performance as Andrés Guerra in Aquí no hay quien viva from 2004 to 2006.

== Biography ==
Santiago Ramos was born on 1 August 1949 in Boadilla. (Note: Then a municipality, currently a minor local entity belonging to the municipality of La Fuente de San Esteban.) He was raised in San Muñoz, province of Salamanca. He dropped out from a licentiate degree in law in order to pursue an acting career. He made his feature film debut in the 1973 thriller Al diablo, con amor. He had a son with actress Gloria Muñoz.

After ensuing appearances in Cabo de vara and Tierra de rastrojos, his film career consolidated with a co-starring role in The Heifer (1985). He then went on to feature in films such as Sé infiel y no mires con quién, Dragon Rapide or Year of Enlightment. His won the Goya Award for Best Actor for his performance in the 1996 film Como un relámpago.

Later film roles include performances in Fugitivas, The Wolf or Los nombres de Alicia. Despite having a seasoned film career prior to that point, he rather achieved popularity in Spain for his performance as Andrés Guerra in comedy television series Aquí no hay quien viva from 2004 to 2006. In July 2005, after a decade of relationship, he married makeup artist Paca Almenara. After his 2013 appearance in comedy series Familia: manual de supervivencia he primarily dedicated to theatre.

== Filmography ==
=== Film ===
| Year | Title | Role | Notes | Ref. |
|---|---|---|---|---|
| 1985 | La vaquilla (The Heifer) | Limeño | | |
| 1985 | Sé infiel y no mires con quién (Be Wanton and Tread No Shame) | Paco | | |
| 1986 | Dragon Rapide | Luis Bolín | | |
| 1986 | El año de las luces (Year of Enlightment) | Pepe | | |
| 1987 | Noche de lobos (Wolves' Moon) | Ramiro | | |
| 1988 | El juego más divertido (The Most Amusing Game) | Dionisio | | |
| 1989 | El río que nos lleva | | | |
| 1989 | Las cosas del querer | | | |
| 1992 | Orquesta Club Virginia (Club Virginia Orchestra) | El Negro | | |
| 1993 | Ciénaga | | | |
| 1995 | El seductor | Federico | | |
| 1996 | Como un relámpago | Rafael Torres | | |
| 1997 | Memorias del ángel caído | Francisco | | |
| 1997 | Gràcies per la propina (Thanks for the Tip) | | | |
| 2000 | Terca vida (Miserable Life) | Paco | | |
| 2001 | El lado oscuro del corazón 2 | | | |
| 2002 | Cuando todo esté en orden (Everything in Place) | Ignacio | | |
| 2002 | El caballero Don Quijote (Don Quixote, Knight Errant) | Sansón Carrasco | | |
| 2003 | Hotel Danubio (Danube Hotel) | Hugo | | |
| 2004 | El lobo (The Wolf) | Pantxo | | |
| 2004 | Tiovivo c.1950 | | | |
| 2005 | Los nombres de Alicia | Julio | | |

=== Television ===
| Year | Title | Role | Notes | Ref. |
|---|---|---|---|---|
| 1999 | Ellas son así | Gandarias | | |
| 2004–06 | Aquí no hay quien viva | Andrés Guerra | | |
| 2013 | Familia: manual de supervivencia | Manolo Oquendo | | |

== Accolades ==
| Year | Award | Category | Work | Result | Ref. |
|---|---|---|---|---|---|
| 1997 | 11th Goya Awards | Best Leading Actor | Como un relámpago | Won | |
| 2005 | 14th Actors and Actresses Union Awards | Best Film Actor in a Minor Role | The Wolf | Nominated | |
