= Antonio Gamero =

Spanish actor (1934–2010)

- Born: Antonio Gamero Aguirre; 2 March 1934; Madrid, Spain
- Died: 26 July 2010 (aged 76); Madrid, Spain
- Occupation: Actor
- Political party: Communist Party of Spain
- Relatives: Mercedes Gamero (daughter)

Antonio Gamero Aguirre (2 March 1934 – 26 July 2010) was a Spanish actor. Primarily known by his supporting roles, he featured in over 200 titles.

== Biography ==
Antonio Gamero Aguirre was born in Madrid on 2 March 1934. He studied law and also joined the Film School. Prior to acting, he worked for Telefónica. A member of the Communist Party of Spain (clandestine during the Francoist dictatorship) since 1957 under the alias 'Alejandro', he was tortured in the DGS headquarters in Puerta del Sol by a police agent who ruptured his eardrums. He had to wear a hearing aid for the rest of his life. Following the beating, he spent two years in prison because of his political activity, after which he was not allowed to direct films and had to deliver screenplays under the pseudonym 'Pilar García', henceforth deciding to become an actor out of necessity. He made his feature film acting debut in 1969 film Historia de la vida de Blancanieves.

He since established himself as a supporting actor, featuring in over 200 titles, including credits in films such as Habla, mudita, Poachers, The Enchanted Forest, Hostages in the Barrio, Divinas palabras, Amanece, que no es poco, Everyone Off to Jail, and Manolito Four Eyes. He last appeared before dying in Nacidas para sufrir, leaving a posthumous appearance in Don Mendo Rock ¿La venganza?.

He died on 26 July 2010 at Madrid's Hospital General Universitario Gregorio Marañón.

He is the father of producer Mercedes Gamero.
