= List of Spanish films of 1982 =

A list of films produced in Spain in 1982 (see 1982 in film).

== 1982 ==
Title	Cast & Crew	Ref.
All Is Possible in Granada (Todo es posible en Granada)	Director: Rafael Romero Marchent Cast: Manolo Escobar, Manolo Gómez Bur	
Antonieta	Director: Carlos Saura Cast: Isabelle Adjani, Hanna Schygulla	
Murder in the Central Committee (Asesinato en el Comité Central)	Director: Vicente Aranda Cast: Patxi Andión, Victoria Abril, Héctor Alterio	
Begin the Beguine (Volver a empezar)	Director: José Luis Garci Cast: Encarna Paso, Antonio Ferrandis	
The Beehive (La colmena)	Director: Mario Camus Cast: José Sacristán, Ana Belén, Victoria Abril, Agustín González, Emilio Gutiérrez Caba, Francisco Rabal, Concha Velasco	
Demons in the Garden (Demonios en el jardín)	Director: Manuel Gutiérrez Aragón Cast: Ana Belén, Imanol Arias, Ángela Molina	
Sweet Hours (Dulces horas)	Director: Carlos Saura Cast: Assumpta Serna	
Labyrinth of Passion (Laberinto de pasiones)	Director: Pedro Almodóvar Cast: Antonio Banderas, Cecilia Roth	
Nacional III	Director: Luis García Berlanga Cast: Luis Escobar, José Luis López Vázquez, Luis Ciges, Amparo Soler Leal, José Luis de Vilallonga, Agustín González	
Pieces (Mil gritos tiene la noche)	Director: Juan Piquer Simón Cast: Lynda Day George, Christopher George	
Cristóbal Colón, de oficio... descubridor	Director: Mariano Ozores Cast: Andrés Pajares, Fiorella Faltoyano, María Kosty	
Colegas	Director: Eloy de la Iglesia Cast: Antonio Flores, Rosario Flores, José Luis Manzano, Enrique San Francisco, José Manuel Cervino	
El hijo del cura	Director: Mariano Ozores Cast: Fernando Esteso, Juanito Navarro, José Sazatornil	
Le llamaban J.R.	Director: Francisco Lara Cast: Pepe da Rosa, Mary Santpere, Antonio Garisa	
Buscando a Perico	Director: Antonio del Real Cast: Luis Escobar, Agustín González, Antonio Gamero, Teddy Bautista, Santiago Ramos	
La vendedora de ropa interior	Director: Germán Lorente Cast: María José Nieto, Julián Navarro, José Sazatornil, Florinda Chico	
Hablamos esta noche	Director: Pilar Miró Cast: Alfredo Mayo, Víctor Valverde, Amparo Soler Leal, Mercedes Sampietro	
¡Que vienen los socialistas!	Director: Mariano Ozores Cast: José Sacristán, Luis Escobar, Antonio Ozores	
El gran mogollón	Director: Tito Fernández Cast: Pedro Ruiz, Amparo Muñoz, Agustín González, Antonio Gamero	
Estoy en crisis	Director: Fernando Colomo Cast: José Sacristán, Mercedes Sampietro, Marta Fernández-Muro, Cristina Marsillach	
Bésame, tonta	Director: Fernando González de Canales Cast: Javier Gurruchaga, Esperanza Roy, Popocho Ayestarán, Manolo Gómez Bur, Paola Dominguín	
Los autonómicos	Director: José María Gutiérrez Cast: Antonio Ozores, Juanito Navarro, María José Nieto	
A contratiempo	Director: Óscar Ladoire Cast: Óscar Ladoire, Mercedes Resino	
Loca por el circo	Director: Luis María Delgado Cast: Teresa Rabal, Rafaela Aparicio, Rafael Alonso	
Chispita y sus gorilas	Director: Luis María Delgado Cast: Macarena Camacho, Miguel Ángel Valero	
Regreso del más allá	Director: Juan José Porto Cast: Ana Obregón, Andrés Resino	
Adulterio nacional	Director: Francisco Lara Cast: Quique Camoiras, Charo López, Paco Cecillo	
Vida/Perra	Director: Javier Aguirre Cast: Esperanza Roy	
Corazón de papel	Director: Roberto Bodegas Cast: Antonio Ferrandis, Patxi Andión, Ana García Obregón, Héctor Alterio	
