= Sonia Bruno =

Spanish actress

- Born: 31 July 1945 (age 80); Barcelona, Spain
- Other name: María Antonia Oyamburu Bruno
- Occupation: Actress
- Years active: 1962–1969 (film)
- Spouse: Pirri (m. 1969)

Sonia Bruno (born 31 July 1945) is a Spanish retired film actress.

== Biography ==
After making small appearances on television, Bruno made her film debut in 1961 with Francisco Rovira Beleta in Los atracadores (The Robbers).

In several of her roles, she presented a look that was prototypical of the 1960s (short hair and bangs, eternal miniskirt), the decade in which she developed her entire career, and which made her an icon of modernity in the vein of Audrey Hepburn or Twiggy, with whom she was compared.

She worked under the direction of Manuel Summers,Luis García Berlanga, Pedro Lazaga, Mariano Ozores, Antonio Eceiza, and Miguel Picazo, among others. Some of the most notable titles in which he appeared include Crimen (1964), El próximo otoño (1967), La boutique (1967), ¿Quiere casarse conmigo? (1967), Novios 68 (1967), No desearás la mujer de tu prójimo (1968), La chica de los anuncios (1968), El marino de los puños de oro (1968), Las secretarias (1969), Turistas y bribones (1969), and El taxi de los conflictos (1969).

She barely tried his luck in other artistic media besides cinema. In theater, he starred in El mantel, with Mary Carrillo company, and on television, he appeared in Jaime de Armiñán's series Tiempo y hora (1966-1967), alongside Antonio Ferrandis and Amparo Baró.

She retired from public life in 1969 when she married Real Madrid footballer Pirri

== Selected filmography ==
- Snakes and Ladders (1965)
- Mission to Caracas (1965)
- Would You Marry Me? (1967)
- The Sailor with Golden Fists (1968)
- Fruit of Temptation (1968)

== Bibliography ==
- Peter Cowie & Derek Elley. World Filmography: 1967. Fairleigh Dickinson University Press, 1977.
