= Nacional III =

1982 film by Luis Garcia Berlanga

- Theatrical release poster
- Directed by: Luis G. Berlanga
- Screenplay by: Luis G. Berlanga; Rafael Azcona
- Starring: Luis Ciges; Luis Escobar; Agustín González; José Luis López Vázquez; Amparo Soler Leal
- Cinematography: Carlos Suárez
- Edited by: José Luis Matesanz
- Production companies: Kaktus PC; InCine; Jet Films
- Release date: 6 December 1982
- Running time: 102 minutes
- Country: Spain
- Language: Spanish

Nacional III is a Spanish comedy film from 1982 directed by Luis García Berlanga and written by him together with Rafael Azcona, the third part of the trilogy about the Leguineche family after La escopeta nacional (1978) and Patrimonio nacional (1981).

The plot explores how after the coup d'état of 23 February and the imminent electoral victory of the Socialists, the Leguineche decide to take their money out of Spain to protect it.

He proposed to make a fourth part about the Leguineche saga, but was frustrated for various reasons. Rafael Azcona and Luis Garcia Berlanga decided to shoot La vaquilla (another film about the Spanish Civil War) first, and the death of the main actor in the saga, Luis Escobar Kirkpatrick, put an end to the project.

== Plot ==
The Marquess of Leguineche has sold his palace for a very humble amount of money and has moved with Luis José, his son, to a flat he has bought next to the Retiro, in Alfonso XII street. They are accompanied by Segundo and Viti, his usual servants, and Father Calvo. Luis José has been separated from his wife, Chus, who is in Extremadura, on his father's estate for some years.

The story begins on 23 February 1981, in the middle of a coup d'état. While Luis José and Segundo plan to patent the "Platoespaña" that will leave them many benefits with the World Cup, Father Calvo longs for a triumph of the coup and Viti, turned from a servant into a lover of the marquess (with the total indifference of her husband), takes care of the house as the owner in pectore that she is.

A telegram notifies them of the sudden death of Chus' father. The whole family moves to Extremadura, to attend the funeral and see if they can get something out of the inheritance. Luis José and Chus reconcile.

Fearing that the socialists would come to power, Chus, following Luis José's instructions, decides to sell his part of the inheritance, convert it into cash and evade the capital to France. They try to do this through a convent and a specialized courier, but finally they will try to camouflage it in the plaster of Luis José, who will travel to Lourdes on a pilgrimage for the sick.

== Cast ==
- Luis Escobar as marqués de Leguineche('Marquis of Leguineche')
- José Luis López Vázquez as Luis José
- Luis Ciges as Segundo
- Agustín González as padre Calvo ('father Calvo')
- Amparo Soler Leal as Chus
- José Luis de Vilallonga as Álvaro
- Chus Lampreave as Viti, the housekeeper
- María Luisa Ponte as Paulita
- Roberto Camardiel as tío Román ('uncle Román')
- Mabel Escaño as Emilia
- Ángel Álvarez as portero
- Francisco Merino as el correo
- Florentino Soria as Pacheco
- Julio Pérez Perucha and Francisco Llinás as los filmófilos del tren ('the cinephiles on the train')
- Carmen Carbonell as tía Piedita ('aunt Piedita')
- Xavier Domingo as profesor de cocina
- Elena Santonja as alumna del curso

== Production ==
It was shot in Madrid, Quintanar de la Orden, the Province of Ciudad Real, Extremadura, and Biarritz.

== Release ==
It premiered on 6 December 1982.

== See also ==
- List of Spanish films of 1982
