= La escopeta nacional =

- The National Shotgun
- Directed by: Luis García Berlanga
- Written by: Luis García Berlanga; Rafael Azcona
- Starring: Rafael Alonso; Luis Escobar; Conchita Montes; Agustín González; Antonio Ferrandis; José Luis López Vázquez; Mónica Randall
- Cinematography: Carlos Suárez
- Edited by: José Luis Matesanz
- Production company: Impala
- Distributed by: In-Cine Compañía Industrial Cinematográfica
- Release date: September 14, 1978 (Spain)
- Running time: 95 minutes
- Country: Spain
- Languages: Catalan; Spanish

La escopeta nacional (in English, The National Shotgun) is a 1978 Spanish comedy film directed by Luis García Berlanga. The first installment in a critically and commercially successful trilogy, the picture is an indictment of the legacy of Francisco Franco and the business classes upon whom he depended for support. The picture was followed in the trilogy by Patrimonio nacional and Nacional III, which were released in 1981 and 1982.

== Plot ==
A Catalan manufacturer of electronic intercoms travels to Madrid, accompanied by his lover, to attend a hunt that he himself has organized. What he intends is to interact with people from Spanish high society to promote his business. At the Marquis of Leguineche's estate he meets various characters and experiences a multitude of situations as absurd as they are crazy.

== Cast ==
- José Sazatornil as Jaume Canivell
- Mónica Randall as Mercé
- Luis Escobar Kirkpatrick as Don José, marquis of Leguineche
- Antonio Ferrandis as Álvaro
- José Luis López Vázquez as Luis José of Leguineche
- Amparo Soler Leal as María Jesús, "Chus"
- Agustín González as Padre Calvo
- Luis Ciges as Segundo
- Bárbara Rey as Vera del Bosque
- Rafael Alonso as Cerrillo

== Production ==
Among the filming locations is the El Ricón estate, in Madrid. It is in the municipality of Aldea del Fresno (in the southwest of the Community of Madrid), 53 km from the capital.

Berlanga was inspired by an incident during the Franco dictatorship: during a hunt, minister Manuel Fraga Iribarne accidentally shot Franco's daughter in the buttocks. Franco, however, did not made much of a fuss about it.

== Awards ==
Círculo de Escritores Cinematográficos

Year	Category	Result	Ref.
1978	Best Film	Won	
