= Adiós, cigüeña, adiós =

- Film poster
- Directed by: Manuel Summers
- Screenplay by: Antonio de Lara; Manuel Summers
- Produced by: Antonio Cuevas
- Cinematography: Luis Cuadrado
- Edited by: Pablo G. del Amo
- Music by: Antonio Pérez Olea
- Production companies: Impala; Kalender Films International
- Distributed by: Compagnie Commerciale Française Cinématographique; Delta; Columbia Pictures Corporation; Daga Films
- Release date: 6 September 1971 (Barcelona)
- Running time: 90 min
- Country: Spain

Adiós, cigüeña, adiós (a.k.a. Goodbye, Stork, Goodbye) is a 1972 Spanish comedy-drama film. It is directed by Manuel Summers, composed by Antonio Pérez Olea and starring by Maria Isabel Álvarez, Francisco Villa and Curro Martín Summers.

This film is related with Del rosa al amarillo (1963) because it is focused on the childhood and the old age.

== Plot ==
In early 1970s Madrid, 15-year-old Arturo (Francisco Villa) falls for 13-year-old Paloma (María Isabel Álvarez), a girl from his neighborhood. After dating for a while, they become a couple during a dance.

On a school trip to the snow in Navacerrada, the two schools involved provide a chance for Arturo and Paloma to be alone, and she ends up getting pregnant.

Fearing their families' reactions and lacking sexual education, Mamen (Beatriz Galbó) and the teens from both groups secretly help prepare for the baby's arrival, deciding to support Paloma together: "We'll all take care of Paloma, and the baby will belong to all of us." At one point, Paloma naively remarks, "It feels good to be grown up..."

== Cast ==
- María Isabel Álvarez as Paloma
- Francisco Villa as Arturo
- Curro Martín Summers as Curro
- Beatriz Galbó as Mamen
- Joaquín Goma
- María Rosa Torrico
- Alicia Peramó
- Luis A. de la Peña
- Felipe Anaya
- Mari Carmen Heras
- José Rodríguez
- Cecilio Muñoz
- Mercedes Borqué
- Alfredo Santacruz
- Juan Bautista Ximénez
- María de la Riva
- Vicente Roca
- Teresa Gisbert
- Ángel Menéndez
- José Bastida
- María Hevia
- Roberto Cruz
- Antonio Alfonso Vidal
- Fernando de la Riva
- Chumy Chúmez as Sr. Chumy
- María Dolores González as Manolo Sánchez
- Mari Ángeles Herranz as Mamen
- Eloísa Mateos as Curro
- José Moratalla as Arturo
- Carlos Revilla as Sr. Chumy
- Claudio Rodríguez as priest
- Ana María Saizar as nun
- Ángel Ter as nun
- Selica Torcal as Paloma
- Joaquín Vidriales as Arturo's father

== Controversy ==
The film attempted to address a taboo topic under Franco-era censorship but faced criticism for its portrayal of Paloma's pregnancy. In the scene where she becomes pregnant, Paloma repeatedly says "no, stop," yet this is depicted as a romantic, innocent act rather than a coercive situation.
