= José Antonio Amor =

Spanish actor

José Antonio Amor is a Spanish actor.

He studied Economic Science at Complutense University of Madrid. He appeared in El juego de la oca (1965), directed by Manuel Summers. He appeared in Timanfaya (Amor prohibido) (1972), directed by José Antonio de la Loma.

== Filmography ==
- El juego de la oca (1965) as Pablo Cárdenas García
- Su nombre es Daphne (1966)
- Margarita y el lobo (1969) as Lorenzo
- Novela (1971)
- And the Crows Will Dig Your Grave (1971) as Jerry (uncredited)
- Golpe de mano (Explosión) (1970) as Fernando
- La casa de las muertas vivientes (1972) as Oliver Bromfield
- Primavera mortal (1973) as Fernando de Oliva
- Timanfaya (Amor prohibido) (1972)
