= África Pratt =

Spanish Vedette

- Born: África Ruiz Prats; 18 September 1946 (age 79); Larache, Tetouan, Morocco
- Occupations: Actress and vedette

África Ruiz Prats, known as África Pratt (born 18 September 1946) is a former Spanish actress and vedette.

She was born in 1946 in Larache. After her father's death, who was a soldier, she moved with her mother to Iberian Peninsula, where she studied in Alfaro. She then stayed seven years in Madrid studying ballet, so she debuted as a vedette at Celia Gámez company.

She first appeared in magazines, such as Lui. In 1960s she appeared on stage in Colomba and Su Excelencia la Embajadora. With Alfredo Alaria she appeared in Japón, mon amour, and finally she was hired by Zorí and Santos. From 1973 she starred in Tío ¿de verdad que vienen de París? along Alfredo Landa, Cuentos de las sábanas blancas, Los bingueros, Un lujo a su alcance along Concha Velascom Arturo Fernández and Nadiuska, La llamaban La Madrina, ¡Qué gozada de divorcio! along Andrés Pajares, Quiero un hijo tuyo, El cura ya tiene hijo and Al este del oeste, along Fernando Esteso, most of them directed by Mariano Ozores.

== Filmography ==
- ¿Se puede? (2004)
- El comisario (2000)
- Hermanas (1998)
- Tío Willy (1998)
- La revista (1996)
- ¡Ay, Señor, Señor! (1995) as Dama 2
- Doña Mariquita de mi corazón (1995)
- Canguros (1994)
- El sexólogo (1994)
- Tretas de mujer (1993) as Charo
- Disparate nacional (1990)
- Una y sonada... (1985) as Elvira
- Memorias del general Escobar (1984) as Angelita
- El cura ya tiene hijo (1984) as Aurora
- Cosas de dos (1984)
- Al este del oeste (1984) as Stella
- Las pícaras (1983)
- Si las mujeres mandaran (o mandasen) (1982) as Sargenta
- Los autonómicos (1982) as Pepa
- Las chicas del bingo (1982) as Patricia
- ¡Qué gozada de divorcio! (1981) as Julia
- Por favor, ocúpate de Amelia (1981)
- ¿Dónde estará mi niño? (1981) as Paloma
- El gran secreto (1980) as Mónica
- El erótico enmascarado (1980) as Azucena
- Teatro breve (1980)
- Los bingueros (1979) as Margarita - repartidora de cartones en Bingo
- Gulliver (1979)
- El sacerdote (1978) as Vicenta 'Fanny'
- Cuentos de las sábanas blancas (1977) as Bernarda
- Secretos de alcoba (1977) as Ángela
- Tío, ¿de verdad vienen de París? (1977) as Sofía
- El segundo poder (1976) as Camila
- Cuando los maridos se iban a la guerra (1976) as Sancha
- Madrid, Costa Fleming (1976) as Maruja
- Novela (1976) as Pequitas
- Casa fundada en 1944 (1975)
- Las protegidas (1975) as Silvia
- Estudio 1 (1975) as Geraldina
- De profesión: polígamo (1975) as Rosita
- Bienvenido, Mister Krif (1975)
- Un lujo a su alcance (1975) as Eva
- Cuando el cuerno suena (1975) as Irene
- Fin de semana al desnudo (1974) as Laura
- Cebo para una adolescente (1974) as Esperanza
- La llamaban La Madrina (1973) as Madame
- Una monja y un Don Juan (1973) as Loli
