= Would You Marry Me? =

Would You Marry Me? may refer to:

- Would You Marry Me? (film), a 1967 musical comedy film
- Would You Marry Me? (TV series), a 2025 romantic comedy series
