= La colmena (film) =

The Beehive
- Theatrical release poster
- Spanish: La colmena
- Directed by: Mario Camus
- Written by: José Luis Dibildos
- Based on: The Hive by Camilo José Cela
- Produced by: José Luis Dibildos
- Starring: Victoria Abril; Francisco Algora; Rafael Alonso; Ana Belén; José Bódalo; Mary Carrillo; Queta Claver; Luis Escobar; Fiorella Faltoyano; Agustín González; Emilio Gutiérrez Caba; Charo López; José Luis López Vázquez; Mario Pardo; Encarna Paso; María Luisa Ponte; Elvira Quintillá; Francisco Rabal; Antonio Resines; José Sacristán; José Sazatornil "Saza"; Elena María Tejeiro; Concha Velasco
- Cinematography: Hans Burmann
- Edited by: José María Biurrun
- Music by: Antón García Abril
- Production company: Ágata Films
- Distributed by: C.B Films
- Release date: 11 October 1982
- Running time: 112 minutes
- Country: Spain
- Language: Spanish
- Box office: 340 million ₧

The Beehive (Spanish: La colmena) is a 1982 Spanish film directed by Mario Camus based on the novel The Hive by Camilo José Cela, it depicts the aftermath of the Spanish Civil War and its impact on several characters. Cela has a small role as Matías Martí.

== Synopsis ==
The film is set in Madrid during the postwar period, beginning in 1942. The population suffers the consequences of the civil war. A group of members of a social gathering meet every day in the café La Delicia:

- Doña Rosa (María Luisa Ponte) is the owner of the central cafe La Delicia that most of the other characters frequent. She is strict and threatens her staff and her clients with physical violence and accusing them of political crimes, so that they work tirelessly and pay for her drinks.
- Several penniless poets, unofficially led by Ricardo Sorbedo (Paco Rabal), meet in the cafeteria ordering the minimum drink and often convincing the academic Don Ibrahim (Luis Escobar) to invite them in a scam game that Ibrahim understands and approves to have someone's sympathy, since he himself, thou wealthy when compared to the poets, is short of support among his peers. The other poets, including Rubio Antofagasta (Mario Pardo) and Ramón Maello (Francisco Algora), seek their fortune by competing in vain for prizes in literary competitions.
- Martín Marco López (José Sacristán) is another writer with even less luck and money than the others. He lives off the charity that his sister Filo (Fiorella Faltoyano) offers him behind the back of her husband, who considers Martín lazy. Martín sleeps for free in a brothel because the madame appreciates the friendship that Martín had had with her late son. He openly represents post-war intellectuals.
- Julián Suárez (Rafael Alonso) is a campy homosexual who lives with his elderly mother Doña Margot in the same building as Filo. He courts Pepe (Antonio Resines), a younger man who can defend him against prejudice, and in return Julián tries to secure Pepe's professional future. When Julián's mother commits suicide, Julián and Pepe are arrested for homicide, reflecting the prejudices against homosexuality, and Martín is also arrested because of his homeless appearance.
- Mario de la Vega (Agustín González) is a wealthy bourgeois who boasts of his fortune, for example by smoking good cigars, and claims to have earned his money by working, when in reality he has risen socially and economically by being on the winning side of the war. He represents the social class that benefited from early Francoism.
- Leonardo Meléndez (José Luis López Vázquez) is a scoundrel and petty swindler who tries to obtain financing for businesses doomed to fail, and thus keep the down payments. He lives in a boarding house, misleading the people around him to steal food. He has experience working in theater, and takes pride in his time in prison, pretending that he went for worthy reasons when he was actually stealing food.
- Tesifonte Ovejero (Saza) is one of Meléndez's boarding companions. A chronic smoker with a worrying cough, he refuses to give up tobacco because it is the only pleasure he has left (Meléndez often offers to take Ovejero's smoker's license, pretending it is to do him a favor). Meléndez tries to help Ovejero succeed with women, but Ovejero ends up looking for a partner on his own.
- Ventura Aguado (Emilio Gutiérrez Caba) is their other boarding companion. He tries to get the notary exam, claiming that he doesn't get it because they don't schedule the tests. Only when he has that position will his girlfriend Julita (Victoria Abril) consent to marry him. He looks for ways to be with her before her wedding, such as renting a room from her, but she finds those acts degrading.
- Victorita (Ana Belén) is in love with a sick man (Imanol Arias), against the wishes of her mother (Encarna Paso). She tries to make a living with dancing, but she is forced to drift into prostitution and meet de la Vega.

== Cast ==
- Victoria Abril as Julita
- Francisco Algora as Ramón Maello
- Rafael Alonso as Julián Suárez
- Ana Belén as Victorita
- José Bódalo as Don Roque
- Mary Carrillo as Doña Asunción
- Camilo José Cela as Matías Martí
- Fiorella Faltoyano as Filo
- Agustín González as Mario de la Vega
- Emilio Gutiérrez Caba as Ventura Aguado
- Charo López as Nati Robles
- José Luis López Vázquez as Leonardo Meléndez
- Encarna Paso as Victorita's mother
- María Luisa Ponte as Doña Rosa
- Elvira Quintillá as Doña Visi
- Francisco Rabal as Ricardo Sorbedo
- Antonio Resines as Pepe "El Astilla"
- José Sacristán as Martín Marcos
- Concha Velasco as Purita
- Luis Barbero as Pepe
- José Sazatornil "Saza" as Tesifonte Ovejero
- Luis Escobar as Don Ibrahim
- Mario Pardo as Rubio Antofagasta
- Queta Claver as Doña Matilde
- Rafael Hernández as Padilla
- Elena María Tejeiro as Señorita Elvira
- Ricardo Tundidor as Roberto González
- Manuel Zarzo as Consorcio López
- Imanol Arias as Victorita's boyfriend
- Luis Ciges as Don Casimiro
- Marta Fernández Muro as Amparito
- Miguel Rellán as brother client
- José Vivó as lender
- Antonio Mingote as mourning man

== Production ==
It was lensed by Hans Burmann, scored by Antón García Abril and edited by José María Biurrun.

== Release ==
Distributed by C.B Films, the film was released theatrically in Spain on 11 October 1982. It grossed 339,694,699 ₧ (1,486,765 admissions). In 1983, it was entered into the 33rd Berlin International Film Festival, where it won the Golden Bear.

== See also ==
- List of Spanish films of 1982
