= Boyfriend in Sight =

- Theatrical release poster
- Directed by: Luis García Berlanga
- Written by: Juan Antonio Bardem; José Luis Colina; Luis García Berlanga; Edgar Neville
- Produced by: Benito Perojo
- Starring: José María Rodero; Antonio Vico (actor, born 1903); José Luis López Vázquez; Josette Arno; Jorge Vico; Irene Caba Alba; Julia Caba Alba
- Cinematography: Miguel Fernández Mila; Cecilio Paniagua; Sebastián Perera
- Edited by: Pepita Orduna
- Music by: Juan Quintero
- Distributed by: CIFESA
- Release date: 15 February 1954
- Running time: 83 minutes
- Country: Spain
- Language: Spanish

Boyfriend in Sight (Spanish: Novio a la vista), is a 1954 Spanish comedy film directed by Luis García Berlanga. It is based on an idea by Spanish filmmaker Edgar Neville, and produced by Benito Perojo.

== Plot ==
The film is set in Spain in 1918. Loli is a young woman who has recently reached marriageable age. Her mother believes that she should find a husband soon and considers the beach at Lindamar (a fictional location; the film was shot at the Hotel Voramar in Benicàssim, Castellón), popular among the upper class at the time, to be an appropriate place for this purpose. They travel to the coast with this objective. The mother hopes that an engineer they know will show interest in Loli. However, Loli is in love with Enrique, a student from a modest background who has recently failed his June exams.

== Cast ==
- Josette Arno as Loli
- Jorge Vico as Enrique García Hurtado
- Julia Caba Alba as Madre de Loli
- Antonio Riquelme as Antonio Cortina
- Julia Lajos as Mujer de Pepito
- Irene Caba Alba as Señora de Cortina
- Fernando Aguirre as Amorós
- Alicia Altabella as Mujer misteriosa
- José Luis López Vázquez as Juanito Renovales
- Luis Roses as Don Enrique
- Carlos Díaz de Mendoza
- Mercedes Muñoz Sampedro as Tía de Loli
- Luis Pérez de León as Ballester
- Concha Fernández as Genoveva Peláez
- Josefina Bejarano as Madre de Genoveva
- Elisa Méndez as
- Juanita Ginzo as Hermana de Genoveva Peláez
- Elena Montserrat
- María Luisa Arias
- Concha López Silva
- José Alburquerque as Catedrático
- Mateo Guitart as Catedrático
- Carmen Villa
- Antonio Truyols
- Enrique S. Guzmán as Gordo
- Terele Pávez as Pecas
- Ana María Caballero
- Jaime Ibrán
- Rafael Membiela
- Mauricio Lapeña
- María Teresa del Castillo
- Federico Urquidi
- María Dolores de la Cámara
- Fernando Rujas
- Juan Díez Nicolás
- Antonio Vico as Don Vicente
- José María Rodero as Federico Villanueva

== Bibliography ==
- Bentley, Bernard. A Companion to Spanish Cinema. Boydell & Brewer 2008.
