= Pepita Orduna =

Spanish film editor

- Occupation: Film editor
- Years active: 1948–1960

Pepita Orduna was a Spanish film editor active in the 1940s and 1950s who worked with filmmakers like Luis G. Berlanga and Antonio del Amo.

== Selected filmography ==
- An American in Toledo (1960)
- Juicio final (1960)
- Hospital general (1958)
- Ángeles sin cielo (1957)
- Miracles of Thursday (1957)
- La mestiza (1956)
- The Rocket from Calabuch (1956)
- Miedo (1956)
- Mañana cuando amanezca (1955)
- Cancha vasca (1955)
- Cursed Mountain (1954)
- Boyfriend in Sight (1954)
- El pescador de coplas (1954)
- That Happy Couple (1953)
- Bella, la salvaje (1953)
- Welcome Mr. Marshall! (1953)
- Don Juan Tenorio (1952)
- Em-Nar, la ciudad de fuego (1952)
- Día tras día (1951)
- Cita con mi viejo corazón (1950)
- Embrujo (1948) (assistant)
