= List of Argentine films of 1967 =

A list of films produced in Argentina in 1967:

Argentine films of 1967
Title	Director	Release	Genre
A - F
El ABC del amor	Helvio Soto, Rodolfo Kuhn and Eduardo Coutinho	7 September	
¡Al diablo con este cura!	Carlos Rinaldi	30 March	
El andador	Enrique Carreras	24 August	drama
La chica del lunes	Leopoldo Torre Nilsson	18 July	drama
La cigarra está que arde	Lucas Demare	4 May	Comedy
Cómo seducir a una mujer	Ricardo Alventosa	2 March	
Cuando los hombres hablan de mujeres	Fernando Ayala	29 June	
Escándalo en la familia	Julio Porter	13 April	
Éste es el romance del Aniceto y la Francisca, de cómo quedó trunco, comenzó la tristeza y unas pocas cosas más...	Leonardo Favio	1 June	drama
¡Esto es alegría!	Enrique Carreras	9 March	
G - P
Gente conmigo	Jorge Darnell	2 March	
El Hombre invisible ataca	Martín Rodríguez Mentasti	6 July	
El loro de la soledad	Juan Antonio Serna and Jorge Enrique Farías	3 August	
Mi mujer, la sueca y yo	Arturo García Buhr	5 April	
Mi secretaria está loca... loca... loca	Alberto Du Bois	16 March	
La muchachada de a bordo	Enrique Cahen Salaberry	18 May	
La muchacha del cuerpo de oro	Dino Minitti	14 September	
Patapúfete	Julio Saraceni	3 August	
La perra	Emilio Gómez Muriel	22 February	
Las pirañas	Luis García Berlanga	19 October	
Placer sangriento	Emilio Vieyra	22 November	
Q - Z
¿Quiere casarse conmigo?	Enrique Carreras	2 March	
La señora del intendente	Armando Bó	1 June	
Tacuara y Chamorro, pichones de hombre	Catrano Catrani	1 June	
Los traidores de San Ángel	Leopoldo Torre Nilsson	17 October	
Villa Cariño	Julio Saraceni	31 August	
Ya tiene comisario el pueblo	Enrique Carreras	13 July	

== External links and references ==
- Argentine films of 1967 at the Internet Movie Database
