= Fruit of Temptation =

- Directed by: Rafael Gil
- Written by: Emilio Romero (play); Rafael J. Salvia
- Starring: Sonia Bruno; Juanjo Menéndez; Antonio Garisa
- Cinematography: José F. Aguayo
- Edited by: José Luis Matesanz
- Music by: Ángel Arteaga
- Production company: Coral Producciones Cinematográficas
- Distributed by: Paramount Films de España
- Release date: 25 June 1968
- Running time: 96 minutes
- Country: Spain
- Language: Spanish

Fruit of Temptation (Spanish: Verde doncella) is a 1968 Spanish comedy film directed by Rafael Gil and starring Sonia Bruno, Juanjo Menéndez and Antonio Garisa.

== Cast ==
- Sonia Bruno as Laura
- Juanjo Menéndez as Moncho
- Antonio Garisa as El hombre de la maleta
- Mary Paz Pondal as Conchita
- Julia Caba Alba as Madre de Laura
- Rafael López Somoza as Padre de Laura
- Venancio Muro as Martínez
- Manuel Alexandre as Don Manuel
- Erasmo Pascual as Vendedor del piso
- Goyo Lebrero as Vendedor de tobacco
- José María Tasso as Fotógrafo
- Pedrín Fernández as Jefe del taller
- Mario Morales as Botones
- Alfredo Santacruz as Comisario

== Bibliography ==
- de España, Rafael. Directory of Spanish and Portuguese film-makers and films. Greenwood Press, 1994.
