= Snakes and Ladders (1965 film) =

1965 film

- Directed by: Manuel Summers
- Written by: Pilar Miró; Manuel Summers
- Starring: Sonia Bruno
- Cinematography: Francisco Fraile
- Edited by: Pedro del Rey
- Release date: 1965
- Running time: 112 minutes
- Country: Spain
- Language: Spanish

Snakes and Ladders (Spanish: El juego de la oca) is a 1965 Spanish comedy film directed by Manuel Summers. It was entered into the 1965 Cannes Film Festival.

== Cast ==
- Sonia Bruno - Ángela
- María Massip - Blanca
- José Antonio Amor - Pablo
- Julieta Serrano
- Pedro Sopeña
- Paco Valladares
- Juan Luis Galiardo - (as L. Galiardo)
- Ángel Luis Álvarez
- Carolina Fraile
- Pascual Martín
- María Burgos
- Ulla Foltin
- Cristina V. López
- Cecilia Villarreal
- Pilar Guijarro
- Guadalupe Olmedo
- Ángel Córdoba
- Luis Barbero - Recepcionista Hotel
- Eduardo Mateo
