= Al este del oeste =

1984 film directed by Mariano Ozores

- Film poster
- Directed by: Mariano Ozores
- Written by: Mariano Ozores
- Produced by: Salvador Ginés; José María Reyzabal
- Starring: Fernando Esteso; Juanito Navarro; Antonio Ozores; Africa Pratt; Fernando Sancho; Adriana Vega; Pilar Bardem; Francisco Camoiras
- Cinematography: Domingo Solano
- Edited by: Antonio Ramírez de Loaysa
- Music by: Gregorio García Segura
- Production company: Ízaro Films
- Release date: January 10, 1984 (Spain)
- Running time: 85 min

Al este del oeste is a 1984 Spanish comedy western film directed and written by Mariano Ozores, and starring Fernando Esteso, Conrado San Martín, Adriana Vega, Fernando Sancho and África Pratt. It was composed by Gregorio García Segura and Esteso sang in the credits.

Diego García is a stuntman. According to Esteso, it is one of his best films.

== Cast ==
- Fernando Esteso as Bill Pistolas de oro
- Antonio Ozores as Polonio Horacio Platón
- Conrado San Martín as Alcalde, Padre de Margaret
- Adriana Vega as Margaret Rose
- Fernando Sancho as Chapulín
- Africa Pratt as Stella
- José Manuel Martín as Bad Milk
- Luis Barbero as Mr. First
- Adrian Ortega
- Francisco Camoiras as Foster - Barber
- Tito García as Tafford, Blacksmith
- Mayte Sancho
- Pilar Bardem as Martha Tafford
- Víctor Israel as Tumbas - Undertaker
- Emilio Fornet as Sheriff Coward
- Francisco Nieto as Bad Milk Henchman
- Guillermo Anton
- Juanito Navarro as Blackandecker
- Joaquin Pascual
- Jose Luis Ayestaran
- Dolores Gonzalez
- Rafaela Godoy
- Susana Cerro
- Leticia Jimenez
- Maria Fernandez
- Paola Parker
- Analia Ibar as Prostituta
- María Teresa Merino

== Bibliography ==
- Núñez Marqués, Anselmo (2006). Western a la europea--: un plato que se sirve frío. Entrelineas Editores. p. 485. ISBN 9788498024326.
