= Juanjo Menéndez =

Spanish actor (1929–2003)

- Born: Juan José Menéndez Gutiérrez de la Torre; 15 May 1929; Madrid, Spain
- Died: 7 November 2003 (aged 74); Madrid, Spain
- Occupation: Actor
- Years active: 1953-1997

Juan José Menéndez Gutiérrez de la Torre (15 May 1929 – 7 November 2003) better known as Juanjo Menéndez was a Spanish actor. He appeared in more than 90 films and television shows between 1953 and 1997. He starred in the film El Lazarillo de Tormes, which won the Golden Bear at the 10th Berlin International Film Festival.

== Selected filmography ==
- Gypsy Curse (1953)
- Two Paths (1954)
- It Happened in Seville (1955)
- Historias de la radio (1955)
- El Lazarillo de Tormes (1959)
- A Nearly Decent Girl (1963)
- Sor Citroën (1967)
- Fruit of Temptation (1968)
- El taxi de los conflictos (1969)
