= Welcome Mr. Marshall! =

1953 Spanish satirical absurdist comedy film by Luis García Berlanga

- Theatrical release poster by Francisco Fernández Zarza
- Directed by: Luis García Berlanga
- Written by: Juan Antonio Bardem; Luis García Berlanga; Miguel Mihura
- Produced by: Vicente Sempere
- Starring: José Isbert; Manolo Morán; Lolita Sevilla
- Cinematography: Manuel Berenguer
- Edited by: Pepita Orduna
- Music by: Jesús García Leoz
- Release date: 4 April 1953
- Running time: 78 minutes
- Country: Spain
- Language: Spanish

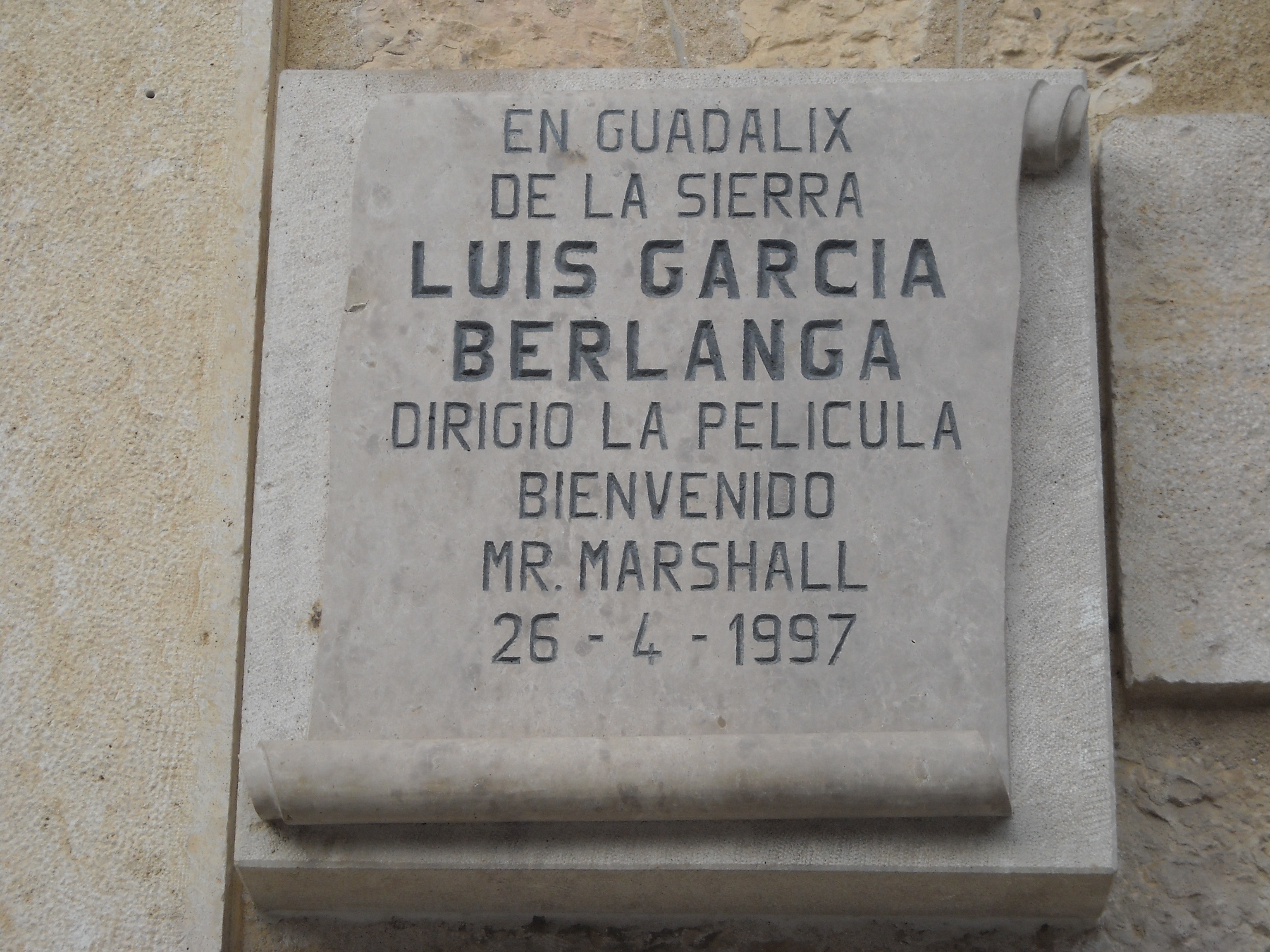
Commemorative plaque in Guadalix de la Sierra, Spain

Welcome Mr. Marshall! (Spanish: ¡Bienvenido, Mister Marshall!) is a 1953 Spanish satirical absurdist comedy film directed by Luis García Berlanga, and considered one of the masterpieces of Spanish cinema. The film highlights the stereotypes held by both the Spanish and the Americans regarding the culture of the other, as well as displays social criticism of 1950s Francoist Spain (showing a typical Spanish village, with typical inhabitants: a priest, the majority of the population that are peasants, the mayor, and a hidalgo). The film was entered into the 1953 Cannes Film Festival. It was the first full-length film Berlanga directed alone.

== Plot ==
A small Castilian town, Villar del Río, is alerted to an upcoming visit of American diplomats; the town begins preparations to impress the American visitors, in the hopes of benefiting under the Marshall Plan. Hoping to demonstrate the side of Spanish culture with which the visiting American officials will be most accustomed, the citizens don unfamiliar Andalusian costumes, hire a renowned flamenco performer, and re-decorate their town in Andalusian style. A flamenco impresario (Manolo Morán) who spent time in Boston advises the locals to think of what they will ask from the Americans.

On the eve of the Americans' visit, three of the central characters dream of stereotypical American culture and history, based uniquely on their lives and experiences. The mayor dreams of a Western-like bar brawl, the hidalgo dreams of the arrival of a conquistador on New World shores, and the priest sees the hoods of a Holy Week procession turn into Klansmen dragging him before the Committee on Un-American Activities accompanied by jazz music. Also, a poorer man dreams that the Americans, shown as the Three Kings, fly over his field and parachute a new tractor into his field.

The day of the Americans' visit arrives and the whole town is prepared to put on a show. However, the American motorcade speeds through the village without stopping. The locals are left to remove the decorations and pay for the expenses with their personal belongings, including the flamenco impresario who gives up a gold ring given to him by the Americans in Boston.

== Production ==
Initially, Berlanga was commissioned to make a film to serve as a vehicle for the budding flamenco singer Lolita Sevilla, but Berlanga decided to give the film a deeper, more satirical meaning. In creating Welcome Mr. Marshall!, Berlanga publicly claimed to offer a human picture of what the Spanish peasant, interested more in crops than in politics, might feel about the American people and their role in the post-war world. Underneath the surface, the film is an anti-Francoist satire despite receiving approval because the censorship board understood it to be an anti-American satire.

Berlanga chose to film in the small village of Guadalix de la Sierra, fifty miles north of Madrid. Villagers were cast as themselves, taking all but the principal roles and changing many of the scenes. During the scene in which townspeople lined up to state their hearts' desires, they ignored the script and asked for what they actually wanted.

Shooting lasted ten weeks with a production budget of $70,000 ($780,000 in 2022 dollars).

== Influence ==
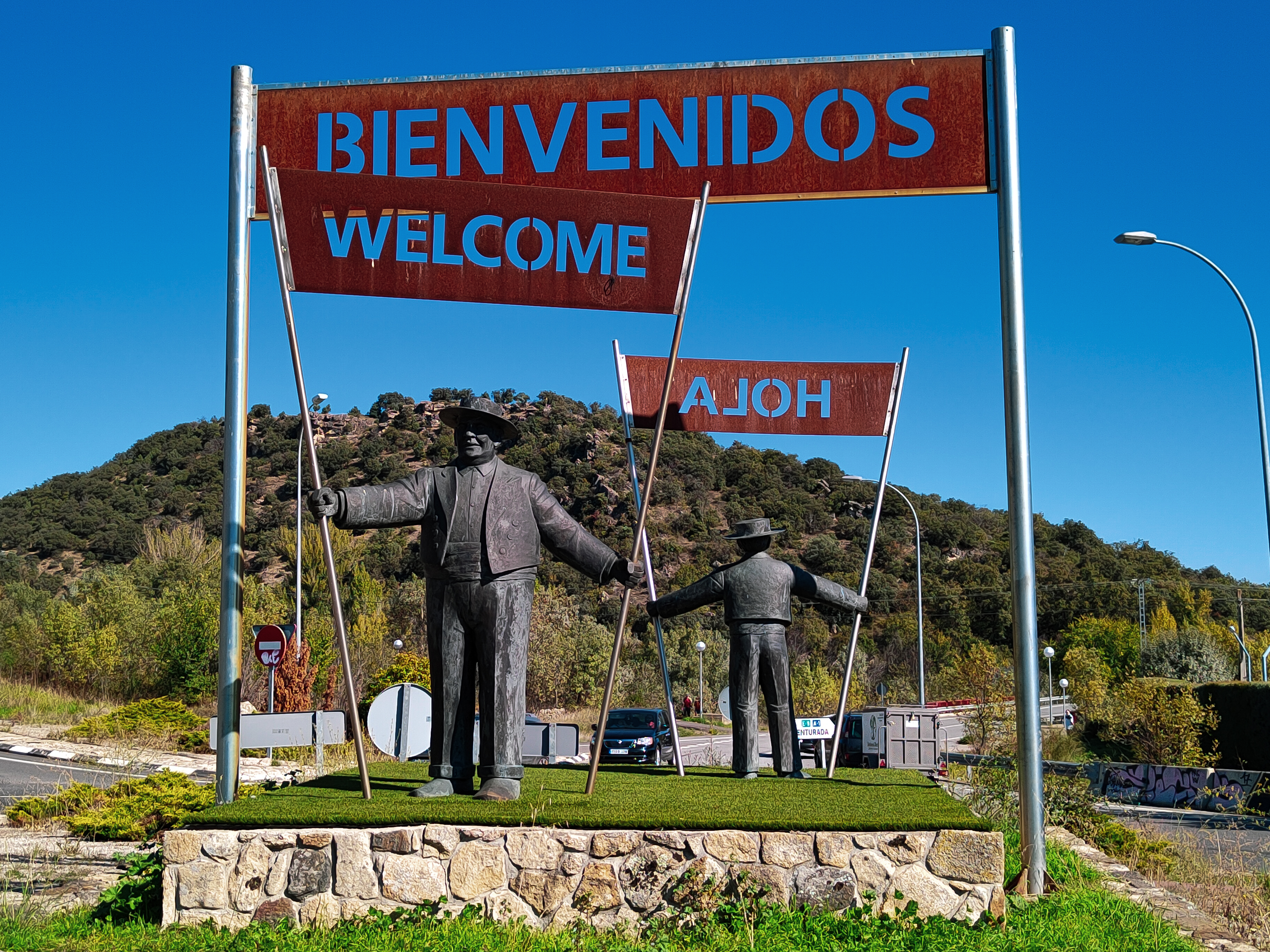
The location of Guadalix has a sculpture depicting Andalusians with welcome signs as in the film.

The title is often mentioned in discussions of American investment in Spain as a caveat against delusion. An example is the 2012-2013 Eurovegas project.

The film is one of the influences on the 2019 Spanish comedy film The Little Switzerland.

== Cast ==
- Fernando Rey as Narrator (voice)
- José Isbert as Don Pablo, the mayor, a hearing-impaired old man
- Lolita Sevilla as Carmen Vargas, a flamenco artist from Andalusia
- Alberto Romea as Don Luis, the hidalgo
- Manolo Morán as Manolo, the scheming agent for Carmen Vargas
- Luis Pérez de León as Don Cosme, the priest, concerned about the American heretics
- Elvira Quintillá as Miss Eloísa, the teacher
- Félix Fernández as Don Emiliano, the doctor
- Nicolás D. Perchicot as the pharmacist (as Nicolás Perchicot)
- Joaquín Roa as the town crier
- Fernando Aguirre as the secretary
- José Franco as the general delegate
- Rafael Alonso as the enviado
- José María Rodríguez as José
- Elisa Méndez as Doña Raquel
- Matilde López Roldán as Doña Matilde

== Reception ==
Welcome Mr. Marshall! received positive reviews by critics and was immensely popular among Spanish audiences, garnering enough praise to gain entry to the Cannes Film Festival. According to Peter Besas, a Madrid correspondent for Variety, the film was denied an award at Cannes when a judge, the actor Edward G. Robinson, under threat from Senator Joseph McCarthy, vetoed it as anti-American. Despite this, Welcome Mr. Marshall! received a Special Mention.

In April 1953, Jane Cianfarra of the New York Times anticipated that the film would "do big things" for what she referred to as "Spain's slumbering film industry" as well as for the future careers of Berlanga and Bardem. In 1993, film critic Stephen Holden observed that "although more than 40 years old, this funny compassionate little fable has an ebullience and freshness that transcend its historical context."
