= Miracles of Thursday =

Los jueves, milagro
- Spanish film poster
- Directed by: Luis García Berlanga
- Written by: Luis García Berlanga; José Luis Colina
- Starring: Richard Basehart; José Isbert; Paolo Stoppa; Juan Calvo; Alberto Romea; Félix Fernández; Manuel de Juan; Guadalupe Muñoz Sampedro; Manuel Alexandre; José Luis López Vázquez
- Cinematography: Francisco Sempere
- Edited by: Pepita Orduna
- Music by: Franco Ferrara
- Release date: 22 August 1957
- Running time: 84 minutes
- Country: Spain
- Language: Spanish

Los jueves, milagro (transl. "On Thursday, miracle") is a 1957 Spanish comedy film directed by Luis García Berlanga. The movie is about people in a small village of Spain who decide to fake a miracle in order to increase tourism but things don't go as planned.

Most shots of the film were made in Alhama de Aragón, Zaragoza.

== Plot ==
A small Spanish town decides to follow the example of Fátima, Lourdes and other places that have progressed thanks to religious apparitions, and its "living forces" decide to invent a miracle to promote their spa. For this, five local characters (the mayor, the teacher, the doctor, the landowner and the owner of the spa) decide to make the town believe in the appearance of a saint, in order to revitalize the visits to the town and the sale of the thermal waters of the dilapidated spa.

Once one of them has been chosen to play San Dimas, due to his resemblance to the figure of the town saint himself, they manage to deceive Mauro, the town fool, from the reality of the town with a (disastrous) fireworks and light show. appearance. At first hardly anyone believes Mauro's words, but when the following Thursday they put on the same show again in the presence of a particularly pious woman from the town, many people begin to wonder if there isn't some truth to the matter. The following Thursday the people go to the land where the previous apparitions had taken place, but everything (music, lights and the "actor" himself in charge of playing Saint Dimas) fails spectacularly and the people return to their homes disenchanted, except for Mauro, who waits for the miracle with outstretched arms.

Soon after, a mysterious character appears in the town who seems to be aware of all the machinations hatched by fraudsters. The character, who introduces himself as a magician, claims to be able to bring the fraud to fruition. Using a mirror from the top of the bell tower, he "heavenly" illuminates the figure of San Dimas. He then convinces the group to pretend to be sick and, with the complicity of the doctor, pretend to recover by drinking the waters of the spa. Strangely, other villagers are actually cured by drinking the spring waters. Soon a real fever to obtain water from the miraculous spring breaks out. When the forgers repent and confess what happened, no one listens to them, since everyone is more busy going to the spring in search of a remedy for their ills. Finally they go to the room where the foreigner is staying, but the only thing they find is a letter where it is said that the figure of San Dimas of the town does not look anything like reality and a photo of the real San Dimas is attached, which is the mysterious stranger.

== Awards ==
Círculo de Escritores Cinematográficos

Year	Category	Result	Ref.
1959	Best Original Screenplay	Won	
