= Cristóbal Colón, de oficio... descubridor =

- Directed by: Mariano Ozores
- Written by: Juan José Alonso Millán
- Starring: Andrés Pajares; Antonio Ozores; Fiorella Faltoyano; Juanito Navarro; Quique Camoiras; José Carabias; Luis Varela
- Music by: Teddy Bautista
- Release date: 1982
- Running time: 77 minutes
- Country: Spain
- Language: Spanish

Cristóbal Colón, de oficio... descubridor ("Christopher Columbus, by profession...discoverer") is a Spanish comedy film, released on 8 September 1982. It is a comic interpretation of the preparations of Columbus before making the discovery of the Americas.

== Plot ==
The film narrates, in comedic tone, the adventures of Christopher Columbus (Andrés Pajares) to convince Queen Isabella (Fiorella Faltoyano) to finance his journey to the West to find East Indies. With constant references to the political and social reality of the moment when the movie was filmed and comic anachronisms such as King Boabdil in charge of a casino. The film ends when Columbus and his crew reach America which they all celebrate singing and dancing.

== Reception ==
In spite of its very bad critics it attracted a million and a half spectators to the cinema, and spawned similar pseudohistorical films such as Juana la loca... de vez en cuando or El Cid Cabreador.
