= Amparo Soler Leal =

Spanish actress (1933–2013)

- Born: María Amparo Soler Leal; 23 August 1933; Madrid, Spain
- Died: 25 October 2013 (aged 80); Barcelona, Spain
- Occupation: Actress
- Years active: 1953–2009

Amparo Soler Leal (23 August 1933 – 25 October 2013) was a Spanish film actress.

She was married to Adolfo Marsillach from 1954 to 1956, and to film producer Alfredo Matas from 1969 until his death in 1996. She worked often with Luis García Berlanga.

== Selected filmography ==
- Such is Madrid (1953)
- Women's Town (1953)
- Usted puede ser un asesino (1961)
- Plácido (1961)
- Vuelve San Valentín (1962)
- La gran familia (1962)
- The Mustard Grain (1962)
- La becerrada (1963)
- The Thief of Tibidabo (1964)
- Las que tienen que servir (1967)
- El bosque del lobo (1970)
- The Discreet Charm of the Bourgeoisie (1972)
- Tamaño natural (1973)
- El amor del Capitán Brando (1973)
- Jo, Papá (1975)
- La adúltera (1975)
- Retrato de familia (1976)
- La escopeta nacional (1977)
- El crimen de Cuenca (1980)
- Gary Cooper que estás en los cielos (1980)
- Patrimonio Nacional (1980)
- Las aventuras de Enrique y Ana (1981)
- Martes y trece...ni te cases ni te embarques (1982)
- Nacional III (1982)
- Bearn o la sala de las muñecas (1982)
- Las bicicletas son para el verano (1983)
- Hay que deshacer la casa (1983)
- La vaquilla (1984)
- ¿Qué he hecho yo para merecer esto? (1984)
- Todos a la cárcel (1993)
- París Tombuctú (1999)
