= That Happy Couple =

Esa pareja feliz
- Theatrical release poster
- Directed by: Juan Antonio Bardem; Luis García Berlanga
- Written by: Juan Antonio Bardem; Luis García Berlanga
- Starring: Fernando Fernán Gómez; Elvira Quintillá
- Cinematography: Willy Goldberger (as Guillermo Golberger)
- Edited by: Pepita Orduna
- Music by: Jesús García Leoz (as Jesús G. Leoz)
- Release date: 31 August 1953
- Running time: 83 minutes
- Country: Spain
- Language: Spanish

Esa pareja feliz (translation: That Happy Couple) is a Spanish comedy film co-written and co-directed by Juan Antonio Bardem and Luis García Berlanga. It was their feature film debut and is considered a criticism of the consumerist desire that was beginning to appear in Spain. The film was made in 1951, but not released until 1953.

== Plot ==
Good-for-nothing, Juan marries Carmen to begin suffering what he thinks her and their friends' scorn at his proven inability to make a living, until he's lured to an apparent sound business that will for sure make them rich.

== Cast ==
- Fernando Fernán Gómez as Juan Granados Muñoz
- Elvira Quintillá as Carmen González Fuentes
- Félix Fernández as Rafa
- José Luis Ozores as Luis
- Fernando Aguirre as Organizador
- Manuel Arbó as Esteban
- Carmen Sánchez as Dueña del salón de té
- Matilde Muñoz Sampedro as Amparo
- Antonio García Quijada as Manolo
- Antonio Garisa as Florentino
- José Franco as Tenor
- Alady as Técnico
- Rafael Bardem as Don Julián, el Comisario
- Rafael Alonso as Gerente Seguros 'La Víspera'
- José Orjas
- Francisco Bernal
- Lola Gaos as Reina en Rodaje
- Matías Prats Cañete as Locutor Deportivo (voice)
- José Luis López Vázquez as Dependiente

== Awards ==
Círculo de Escritores Cinematográficos

Year	Award	Nominee	Result	Ref.
1951	"Jimeno" Revelation Award	Juan Antonio Bardem; Luis García Berlanga	Won	
