= El taxi de los conflictos =

- Directed by: José Luis Sáenz de Heredia, Antonio Ozores
- Screenplay by: José María Palacio, José Luis Sáenz de Heredia, Mariano Ozores
- Cinematography: Emilio Foriscot
- Edited by: Antonio Ramírez
- Release date: 1969
- Running time: 100 min
- Country: Spanish
- Language: Spanish

El taxi de los conflictos (lit. 'Taxi of troubles') is a 1969 Spanish musical comedy film starring Juanjo Menéndez and featuring a large roster of popular actors and singers, among whom are Marisol who sings her recent song "Corazón contento" and Carmen Sevilla who sings "Será el amor".

The film was directed by José Luis Sáenz de Heredia and Antonio Ozores based on the script by José María Palacio, José Luis Sáenz de Heredia and Mariano Ozores.

It was the last film where Marisol shared the roster with Isabel Garcés, though this time they were featured in separate segments and didn't interact.

== Plot ==
The film follows one work shift of a taxi driver named Tadeo (played by Juanjo Menéndez) as he gives rides to various characters (played by big Spanish stars of the time). Every passenger creates a new challenge.

== Cast ==
In the order of appearance:

- Juanjo Menéndez as "Tadeo Fernández"
- Carmen Sevilla as "Cantante"
- Massiel as "Una extranjera"
- Sonia Bruno as "Una extranjera"
- Peter Damon as "El americano"
- Juan Diego as "Sebastián López Miranda"
- Luis Rivera as "Enrique"
- Manolo Otero as "Paco"
- Venancio Muro as "Pascual"
- Olga Peiró as "Damiana"
- Juanito Navarro as "Juan"
- Alberto Closas as "El atracador"
- José Suárez as "Guardia en puerta de comisaría"
- Antonio Ozores as "Inspector Rovira"
- Casalilla as "Hombre en comisaría"
- Robledo as "Policía"
- Eduardo Fajardo as "Comisario Diéguez"
- Gracita Morales as "La chacha"
- Isabel Garcés as "La señora devota"
- Zori, Santos and Codeso as "El ayudante del director", "Federico, el director" and "El scrip"
- Marisol as "Marisol"
- Jaime de Mora as "Don Jaime"
- Conchita Velasco as "La hermana de Catalina"
- Mary Carmen Prendes as "Miss Carbajal"
- Alberto Fernández as "Alberto"
- Armando Calvo as "El marido engañado"
- Paquita Rico as "La mujer amante de Alfredo"
- Alfredo Mayo as "Alfredo, el amante"
- Roberto Camardiel as "El tio de Catalina"
- Ernestito Zafrilla as "El niño repelente"
- Tito García as "Policía casado"
- Pamplona
- Pilar Cansinos as "Consorte del bígamo #1"
- María del Carmen Martín as "Consorte del bígamo #2"
- Peret (and his gypsies) as "El bígamo"
- María Mahor as "Soledad"
- Ángel Terrón as "El tendero"
- Lola Flores, her daughter Rosarito and Antonio González as "Lola", "Niña de Lola" and "Antonio"
- Antonio Pica as "Novio de la hermana de Catalina"
- Rafael L. Somoza as "Don Gervasio"
- Pili as "Catalina"
- Félix Dafauce as "El sacerdote"

== Music ==
- "Será el amor" – Carmen Sevilla
- "Corazón contento" – Marisol
- "Pleitos tengas" – Peret
- "Que me coma el tigre" – Lola Flores and Antonio González "El Pescaílla"
