= Luis Escobar Kirkpatrick =

Spanish nobleman and actor (1908-1991)

The Most Illustrious Luis Escobar
- Born: Luis Escobar y Kirkpatrick; 5 September 1908; Madrid, Spain
- Died: 16 February 1991 (aged 82); Madrid, Spain

Luis Escobar y Kirkpatrick, 7th Marquess of Marismas del Guadalquivir (5 September 1908 – 16 February 1991), was a Spanish nobleman and actor.

He was an actor, playwright, and theatre director who advanced the interests of Teatro María Guerrero, Teatro Español, and Teatro Eslava. A flamboyant aristocrat, he was particularly known to have played el marqués de Leguineche (the Marquess of Leguineche) in Luis García Berlanga's comedy trilogy: La Escopeta Nacional (1978), Patrimonio Nacional (1981) and Nacional III (1982). In 1950, he directed La honradez de la cerradura, which was nominated at the 1951 Cannes Film Festival.

Escobar never married and was openly homosexual, especially after Spanish democracy was restored in 1975. His niece, María Victoria Escobar y Cancho, succeeded him in the Marquessate of Marismas del Guadalquivir upon his death in 1991.

== Selected filmography ==
=== Film ===
- La Escopeta Nacional (1978)
- Patrimonio Nacional (1981)
- Nacional III (1982)
- La Colmena (1982)

=== Director ===
- Malibran's Song (1951)

== See also ==
- Spanish nobility

Spanish nobility
Preceded by José Ignacio Escobar	Marquess of Marismas del Guadalquivir; 1977–1991	Succeeded by María Victoria Escobar
