= Guadalupe Muñoz Sampedro =

Spanish actress (1896–1975)

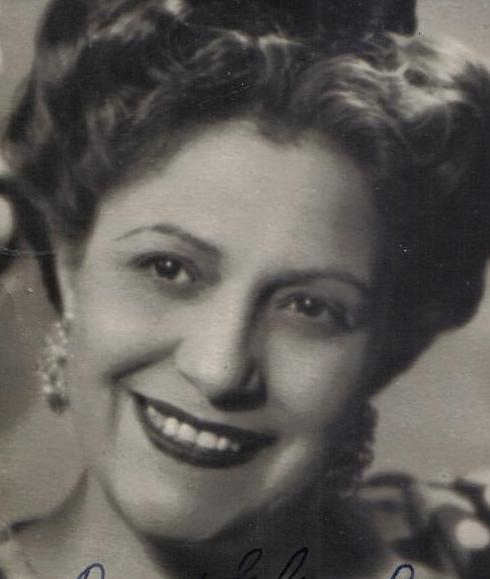
- Muñoz Sampedro in 1935
- Born: 15 February 1896; Madrid, Spain
- Died: 4 December 1975 (aged 79); Madrid, Spain
- Occupation: Actress
- Years active: 1940–1975 (film)
- Children: Luchy Soto
- Relatives: Matilde Muñoz Sampedro (sister); Mercedes Muñoz Sampedro (sister)

Guadalupe Muñoz Sampedro (1896–1975) was a Spanish film actress. She was the mother of the actress Luchy Soto.

Her sisters Matilde Muñoz Sampedro and Mercedes Muñoz Sampedro were also both actors.

== Selected filmography ==
- Heart of Gold (1941)
- Stowaway on Board (1941)
- Intrigue (1942)
- Eloisa Is Under an Almond Tree (1943)
- Radio Stories (1955)
- Miracles of Thursday (1957)
- The Last Torch Song (1957)
- The Showgirl (1960)
- Queen of the Tabarin Club (1960)
- Maribel and the Strange Family (1960)
- Television Stories (1965)
- A Decent Adultery (1969)
- No desearás al vecino del quinto (1970)
- The Green Envelope (1971)
- En un mundo nuevo (1972)
- Zorrita Martinez (1975)

== Bibliography ==
- D'Lugo, Marvin. Guide to the Cinema of Spain. Greenwood Publishing, 1997.
