= The Rocket from Calabuch =

Calabuch
- Spanish film poster
- Directed by: Luis García Berlanga
- Written by: Leonardo Martín; Florentino Soria; Luis García Berlanga; Ennio Flaiano
- Starring: Edmund Gwenn; Valentina Cortese; Franco Fabrizi; José Isbert; Manuel Alexandre
- Cinematography: Francisco Sempere
- Edited by: Pepita Orduna
- Music by: Guido Guerrini
- Release date: 1 October 1956
- Running time: 93 minutes
- Country: Spain-Italy
- Language: Spanish

Calabuch (US title: The Rocket From Calabuch) is a 1956 comedy film directed by Luis García Berlanga.

== Synopsis ==
Calabuch is a little village in the coast of Spain. There arrives Dr. George Hamilton (Edmund Gwenn), a scientist expert in rockets who is tired of his job.

Hamilton decides to help the people of Calabuch in a fireworks competition. He wins and his photo appears in the local newspaper and then NASA and the army find him.

== Production background ==
This Spanish-Italian co-production was filmed in Peniscola, Castellón, and features an international cast led by British-American actor Edmund Gwenn in his last film role, and Italians Valentina Cortese and Franco Fabrizi. Berlanga won the OCIC Award at the Venice Film Festival.
