= The Girl in Mourning =

1964 film

- Directed by: Manuel Summers
- Written by: Tico Medina; Francisco Summers; Bernardo Ballester; Pilar Miró; Manuel Summers
- Produced by: Francisco Lara Polop; Manuel Summers
- Starring: María José Alfonso
- Cinematography: Francisco Fraile
- Edited by: Pedro del Rey
- Release date: 16 November 1964
- Running time: 85 minutes
- Country: Spain
- Language: Spanish

The Girl in Mourning (Spanish: La niña de luto) is a 1964 Spanish comedy film directed by Manuel Summers. It was entered into the 1964 Cannes Film Festival. The film was also selected as the Spanish entry for the Best Foreign Language Film at the 37th Academy Awards, but was not accepted as a nominee.

== Cast ==
- María José Alfonso - Rocío Vázquez Romero
- Alfredo Landa - Rafael Castroviejo
- Pilar Gómez Ferrer - Madre de Rocío
- Vicente Llosa
- José Vicente Cerrudo
- Carmen Santonja
- Doris Kent - (as Doris Ken)
- Mercedes Huete
- Manuel Ayuso
- Manuel Guitián - (as Manuel Guitian)
- Salvador Cortés
- Emilio García Domenech - (as Emilio G. Domenech)
- Diego Rañón
- Francisco Summers
- Pascual Costafreda - (as Pascual de Costafreda)

== See also ==
- List of submissions to the 37th Academy Awards for Best Foreign Language Film
- List of Spanish submissions for the Academy Award for Best Foreign Language Film
