= The Green Envelope =

- Directed by: Rafael Gil
- Written by: Jacinto Guerrero (book); Joaquín Jiménez; Manuel Parada; Enrique Paradas; Rafael J. Salvia
- Starring: Tony Leblanc; Esperanza Roy; Guadalupe Muñoz Sampedro
- Cinematography: José F. Aguayo
- Edited by: José Luis Matesanz
- Music by: Jacinto Guerrero; Manuel Parada
- Production company: Coral Producciones Cinematográficas
- Distributed by: Paramount Films de España
- Release date: 26 February 1971
- Running time: 93 minutes
- Country: Spain
- Language: Spanish

The Green Envelope (Spanish:El sobre verde) is a 1971 Spanish musical comedy film directed by Rafael Gil and starring Tony Leblanc, Esperanza Roy and Guadalupe Muñoz Sampedro.

== Cast ==
- Tony Leblanc as Fortunato / Mariano
- Esperanza Roy as Katia Kayles
- Guadalupe Muñoz Sampedro as Clotilde
- Beni Deus as Remartínez
- Mary Paz Pondal as Julia
- Carlos Ballesteros as Eliseo
- Goyo Lebrero as Lucas
- Venancio Muro as Paco
- Alfonso del Real as Don Antonio
- Pedrín Fernández as Pepe
- Gonzalo Cañas as Ricardo
- Mary Begoña as Chelo
- Erasmo Pascual as Víctor
- Luis Induni as Sánchez
- Rosa Palomar as Tatiana
- Luis Barbero as Bombero
- Fernanda Hurtado
- José Morales as Traspunte
- Fabián Conde as Pintor
- Francisco Casares as Igor
- Javier de Rivera
- Ricardo Palacios as Carromoto
- Arturo Fernández as himself

== Bibliography ==
- Bentley, Bernard. A Companion to Spanish Cinema. Boydell & Brewer 2008.
