= La Biblia en pasta =

Spanish animated film

- Directed by: Manuel Summers
- Written by: Manuel Summers
- Starring: Celedón Parra; Annette Meisl; Fulgencio Sequeiro; José Luis de la Fuente; Emilio Fornet; Guillermo Summers; Manuel Summers
- Music by: Carlos Viziello
- Distributed by: Warner Española
- Release date: 1984
- Running time: 87 minutes
- Country: Spain
- Language: Spanish

La Biblia en pasta (Spanish for "The Bible in pulp paper", a Spanish idiom for something hard and difficult) is a 1984 Spanish comedy film directed by Manuel Summers. It is a humorous version of some episodes from the Old Testament.

== Plot ==
The film shows a humorous version of four episodes of Genesis: Adam and Eve, Cain and Abel, the Flood and the Tower of Babel, also Abraham appears very briefly at the end. There are many anachronisms for humorous purposes, such as Noah's Ark having windscreen wipers or Cain singing the Internationale and absurd jokes such as Noah painting stripes on a white horse to hide not having a zebra.

== Critic ==
Spanish critic Carlos Aguilar in his Guía del cine español considers this film "painful".
