= The Honesty of the Lock =

1950 film

La honradez de la cerradura
- Directed by: Luis Escobar
- Written by: Jacinto Benavente; Luis Escobar
- Produced by: José Carreras Planas; Antonio Sau Olite
- Starring: Esperanza Barrera
- Cinematography: Emilio Foriscot
- Edited by: Ramón Biadiú
- Release date: 9 September 1950
- Running time: 88 minutes
- Country: Spain
- Language: Spanish

The Honesty of the Lock (Spanish: La honradez de la cerradura) is a 1950 Spanish drama film directed by Luis Escobar. It was entered into the 1951 Cannes Film Festival.

== Cast ==
- Esperanza Barrera
- Dolores Bremón
- Paquita Bresoli
- Modesto Cid
- Margarita de Córdoba - dancer
- Miguel de Granada
- María Victoria Durá
- Ramón Elías
- Juan García
- Mercedes Gisbert
- Manuel González
- Concha López Silva
- Ricardo Martín
- Ramón Martori
- Pedro Mascaró
- Pilar Muñoz
- María Esperanza Navarro
- Mayrata O'Wisiedo
- José Manuel Pinillos
- Antonio Polo
- Pedro Puche
- Francisco Rabal
- Ramón Vaccaro
- Juan Velilla
