= The Sailor with Golden Fists =

1968 film by Rafael Gil

- Directed by: Rafael Gil
- Written by: Rafael García Serrano; Rafael Gil; Ángel Oliver
- Starring: Pedro Carrasco; Sonia Bruno; Antonio Garisa
- Cinematography: José F. Aguayo
- Edited by: José Luis Matesanz
- Music by: Manuel Parada
- Production company: Coral Producciones Cinematográficas
- Distributed by: Paramount Films de España
- Release date: 7 October 1968
- Running time: 102 minutes
- Country: Spain
- Language: Spanish

The Sailor with Golden Fists (Spanish:El marino de los puños de oro) is a 1968 Spanish comedy film directed by Rafael Gil and starring Pedro Carrasco, Sonia Bruno and Antonio Garisa.

== Cast ==
- Pedro Carrasco as Pedro Montero
- Sonia Bruno as Gina
- Antonio Garisa as Juanito Berroquell
- Ángel de Andrés as Héctor
- José Sazatornil as Lodoli
- Venancio Muro as Sargento Sancho
- Luis Induni as Padre de Pedro
- Ana María Morales
- Goyo Lebrero
- María Martín
- José María Tasso
- Rosa Palomar
- Alfredo Santacruz
- Nélida Quiroga as Madre de Pedro
- Andrés Pajares as Darío
- Patricia Nigel as Alicia
- Roberto Camardiel as Tito Porro
- María Kosty as Novia de Dario

== Bibliography ==
- Bentley, Bernard. A Companion to Spanish Cinema. Boydell & Brewer 2008.
