= Juanito Navarro =

Spanish actor

- Born: Juan Navarro Rubinos; July 8, 1924; Madrid, Spain
- Died: January 10, 2011 (aged 86); Madrid, Spain
- Occupation: Actor

Juan Navarro Rubinos (July 8, 1924 – January 10, 2011), better known as Juanito Navarro, was a Spanish film, theater and television actor. He died on 10 January 2011 from a cardiac arrest in Madrid at the age of 86.

== Biography ==
He studied aeronautical engineering. He began in 1945 at the age of 21, and one of his first theater roles, among many others, was in one of the versions of Jacinto Guerrero comic musical zarzuela La blanca doble. In the early 1950s, he worked in the revue company of Madrid's Teatro La Latina, a theater with which he would become closely associated over the years, with shows such as El Trust tris tras with Luis Cuenca, Antonio Garisa, and Raquel Daina. In 1952, he joined Maestro Cabrera's revue company, performing in comic and musical plays such as Pan, amor y...postre (1955) with the star Carmen Jareño, and Lo tomas o ...lo dejas (1957) with the star Amparo de Lerma.

In 1958, he decided to form his own comedy company, with which he revived and premiered hits such as ¡Clavijo, búscame un hijo! by Francisco G. Loygorri, La mujer compuesta by Luis Tejedor and Alfayete, El orgullo de Albacete, by Pierre Veber, and ¡Orozco que te conozco! by Francisco G. Loygorri, which had been premiered by Francisco Martínez Soria. In 1960, he joined the revue company Ramón Clemente y Muñoz Román, which in 1959 successfully revived the anthology by maestros Francisco Alonso and Jacinto Guerrero entitled Un matraco en Nueva York. In this show, he performed for the first time with a very young comic star,Lina Morgan, who premiered it in 1958 at the Teatro Alcázar. Juanito premiered this revue throughout Spain, and Lina Morgan left to revive it with Antonio Casal and Addy Ventura in Madrid.

In 1960-1961, Juanito Navarro broke records for length of stay and box office takings in Madrid, at the Teatro Alcázar from April 10 to September 20, 1960. Four successful seasons with his Compañía de Comedias Cómicas (Comedy Theater Company). He premiered the following repertoire alongside the star Addy Ventura: Doña Mariquita de mi corazón (My Beloved Mariquita), by José Muñoz Román, ¡Ya tengo papá y mamá! (I Have a Dad and a Mom Now!) by Loigorri and Fernández Rica, La heroína de Alpedrete (The Heroine of Alpedrete) by Daniel España and López Monis, Un hombre tranquilo (A Quiet Man) by Adrián Ortega, Don Manuel y la extraña reliquia (Don Manuel and the Strange Relic) by José de Juanes, Las novias (The Brides) by Juan García de Aizpuru and Tejedor, and Doña Inés del alma mía (Doña Inés of My Soul) by José Muñoz Román. The last one he did with Maestro Cabrera was the one that celebrated its centenary at the Calderón Theater, Ellas, ellos... y el taxista! (Them, Them... and the Taxi Driver!) by Arena and Valls. This was performed in the provinces alongside the premiere of Los líos del Cordobés (The Troubles of the Cordoban) by Parada, Valls, and Cabrera, during the 1961-1962 season.

== Filmography ==
=== Film ===
- 1968: Relaciones casi públicas.
- 1969: Las Leandras.
- 1969: El taxi de los conflictos.
- 1971: Una chica casi decente.
- 1971: En un mundo nuevo.
- 1973: Me has hecho perder el juicio.
- 1973: Celos, amor y mercado común.
- 1974: Cuando el cuerno suena.
- 1975: English Striptease
- 1975: Esclava te doy.
- 1975: Canciones de nuestra vida.
- 1976: Mauricio, mon amour.
- 1976: The Legion Like Women
- 1977: La coquito.
- 1977: La mujer es un buen negocio.
- 1977: Estimado Sr. Juez.
- 1980: La masajista profesional.
- 1980: El erótico enmascarado.
- 1981: Queremos un hijo tuyo.
- 1981: Qué gozada de divorcio.
- 1981: Los chulos.
- 1981: El primer divorcio.
- 1982: Todos al suelo.
- 1982: Los autonómicos.

- 1982: El hijo del cura.
- 1982: Cristóbal Colón, de oficio... descubridor.
- 1983: Los caraduros.
- 1983: La Lola nos lleva al huerto.
- 1983: Juana la loca... de vez en cuando.
- 1983: El currante.
- 1983: El cura ya tiene hijo.
- 1983: Cuando Almanzor perdió el tambor.
- 1983: Agítese antes de usarla.
- 1984: El rollo de septiembre.
- 1984: El pan debajo del brazo.
- 1984: Al este del oeste.
- 1985: Qué tía la CIA.
- 1985: Cuatro mujeres y un lío.
- 1986: Los presuntos.
- 1987: No hija, no.
- 1987: Esto sí se hace.
- 1987: Esto es un atraco.
- 1988: Veneno que tú me dieras.
- 1988: Los obsexos.
- 1988: Canción triste de....
- 1989: El equipo Aagghh.
- 2001: Torrente 2: Misión en Marbella.
