= Del rosa al amarillo =

- Directed by: Manuel Summers
- Written by: Manuel Summers
- Produced by: Impala S.A. Eco Films S.A.
- Starring: Cristina Galbó; Pedro Díez del Corral; José Vicente Ferrudo; Lina Onesti
- Music by: Antonio Pérez Olea
- Release date: 1963
- Running time: 87 minutes
- Country: Spain
- Language: Spanish

Del rosa al amarillo (English: From pink to yellow) is a 1963 Spanish film. It was directed and written by Manuel Summers.

The film's plot explores two love stories involving a young couple and an elderly couple.

== Cast ==
- Cristina Galbó
- Pedro Díez del Corral
- José Vicente Cerrudo - Valentín
- Lina Onesti - Josefa
