= Fernando Esteso =

Spanish actor (1945–2026)

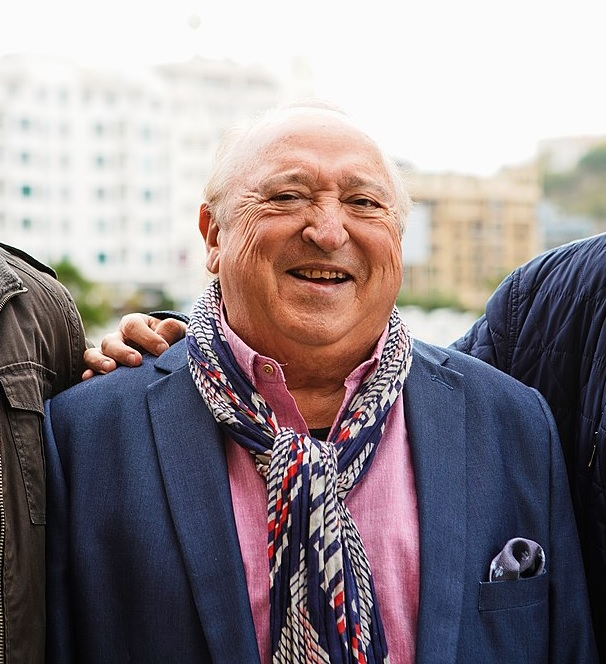
- Esteso in 2019
- Born: Fernando Julián Esteso Allué; 16 February 1945; Zaragoza, Spain
- Died: 1 February 2026 (aged 80); Valencia, Spain
- Occupations: Actor; singer
- Years active: 1964–2025

Fernando Julián Esteso Allué (16 February 1945 – 1 February 2026) was a Spanish actor and singer. He was best known for his film appearances with Andrés Pajares.

== Background ==
In 1949 at the age of four he made his debut as a clown with his father, in 1964 he moved to Madrid where he did stage plays and in 1973 he made his debut on films. He was married to María José Egea, and she died on 13 December 2003 from a cancer and was cremated at cementerio de la Almudena in Madrid. Prior to their divorce, they had had at least one child.

== Career ==
Esteso made a comic duo with Andrés Pajares and they appeared in nine comedy films between 1979 and 1983 such as Los energéticos, Los bingueros, Yo hice a Roque III, Los chulos, Los liantes, Padre no hay más que dos, Todos al suelo, Agítese antes de usarla and La lola nos lleva al huerto, some of them starring Antonio Ozores, Adriana Vega, Mirta Miller, Paloma Hurtado, Ángel de Andrés.

He also worked as a singer, including the songs "La Ramona", "El Zurriagazo", "El Bellotero pop" and "Los niños con las niñas". In 2011 "La Ramona" was sung by King Africa and Esteso.

In 2006, he was going to appear with Pajares in a film titled El código Aparinci, but it was cancelled.

== Death ==
Esteso died from respiratory failure at Hospital Universitario La Fe, on 1 February 2026, at the age of 80.

== Awards ==
In 2016 he won the Simón de Honor at Premios Simón.

== Filmography ==
- Torrente: Presidente (2026)
- Incestum (TBA) as Padre Torres
- Burga (TBA) as Edmundo
- Justo antes de Cristo (2019)
- Love in Difficult Times (2019) as Manolo
- Los habitantes de la casa deshabitada (2018) as Manuel
- Luces (2017) as Inspector Carlos Cerezo
- Una función para olvidar (2017) as Alfonso
- Incerta glòria (2017) as Moliner
- Re-emigrantes (2016) as Santiago Briones
- José Mota presenta (2015–2016) as Cuñao / Paciente concursante
- Gym Tony (2015) as Jefe
- Torrente 5: Operación Eurovegas (2014) as Cuadrado
- La que se avecina (2014) as Fernando Esteso
- Blockbuster (2013) as Esteso
- Los hijos de Mambrú (2012) as Comándante
- Torrente 4: Lethal Crisis (2011) as Cuadrado
- DVD (2006) as himself
- Con dos cojones (2010) as Míster
- El amor sí tiene cura (1991) as Don Cristóbal / Don Abilio
- Las locas historias (1988)
- Viva la risa (1987)
- En vivo (1985) as Faustino Pascual / Cifuentes / Himself
- Cuatro mujeres y un lío (1985) as Federico
- El recomendado (1985) as Pablo Munilla
- ¡Qué tía la C.I.A.! (1985) as Carlos del Campo
- Un, dos, tres... responda otra vez (1985) as Debutante en Periodismo
- El cura ya tiene hijo (1984) as Don Justo – el cura
- La Lola nos lleva al huerto (1984) as Paco Andújar
- Al este del oeste (1984) as Bill Pistolas de oro
- Los caraduros (1983) as Restaurant Customer
- Agítese antes de usarla (1983) as Fabricio
- El currante (1983) as Justo
- Padre no hay más que dos (1982) as Florencio
- El hijo del cura (1982) as Don Justo – el cura
- Todos al suelo (1982) as Facundo Bonilla (Nº 0)
- Caray con el divorcio (1982) as David
- Queremos un hijo tuyo (1981) as Lorenzo
- Los liantes (1981) as Fidel
- El soplagaitas (1981) as Ramiro
- Los chulos (1981) as Félix Rebolledo, el chulo
- La masajista vocacional (1981) as Presidente
- Yo hice a Roque III (1980) as Federico Castro
- El erótico enmascarado (1980) as Manolo Quintanar
- Los energéticos (1979) as Floro / Fabián / Abuelo Belloto
- Los bingueros (1979) as Fermín Cejuela
- Pepito piscina (1978) as José Fernández Arriba 'Pepito Piscina'
- Virilidad a la española (1977) as Orencio
- Onofre (1974) as Onofre Rosado Fernández
- Celos, amor y Mercado Común (1973) as Alberto, el decorador
