= Mercedes Muñoz Sampedro =

Spanish actress (1896–1979)

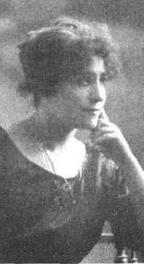
- Muñoz Sampedro in 1919
- Born: 1896; Madrid, Spain
- Died: 4 February 1975 (aged 78–79); Madrid, Spain
- Occupation: Actress
- Years active: 1946–1964 (film)
- Relatives: Guadalupe Muñoz Sampedro (sister); Matilde Muñoz Sampedro (sister)

Mercedes Muñoz Sampedro (1896–1975) was a Spanish stage and film actress.

She was the mother of actress Carmen Lozano. Her sisters Matilde Muñoz Sampedro and Guadalupe Muñoz Sampedro were also both actresses. She died on 4 February 1975.

== Filmography ==
| Year | Title | Role | Notes |
|---|---|---|---|
| 1946 | El crimen de Pepe Conde | Pupilera de la fonda La marina | |
| 1947 | Luis Candelas, el ladrón de Madrid | | |
| 1949 | Jalisco Sings in Seville | | |
| 1951 | Service at Sea | Madre de Sara | |
| 1953 | Airport | Criada de Fernando | |
| 1954 | Novio a la vista | Tía de Loli | |
| 1955 | Un día perdido | Portera | |
| 1956 | La chica del barrio | Doña Filo | |
| 1956 | Manolo guardia urbano | Angustias, cuñada de Manolo | |
| 1957 | Un abrigo a cuadros | Encargada del guardarropa | |
| 1957 | Un marido de ida y vuelta | Tía Etelvina | |
| 1958 | El inquilino | Daniela | |
| 1958 | Farmacia de guardia | | |
| 1959 | Luxury Cabin | Doña Sofía | |
| 1960 | El cerro de los locos | Invitada de Raúl | |
| 1960 | Un trono para Cristy | Reme | |
| 1960 | El indulto | Madre de Pili | |
| 1963 | Rocío de La Mancha | Monja mayor | |
| 1964 | La historia de Bienvenido | Mercedes | Uncredited |
| 1964 | Fin de semana | Amiga de Concha #1 | |
| 1964 | La hora incógnita | Sofía | |
| 1966 | Balearic Caper | Madre de Fernando | (final film role) |

== Bibliography ==
- Pascual Cebollada & Mary G. Santa Eulalia. Madrid y el cine: panorama filmográfico de cien años de historia. Consejería de Educación, Comunidad de Madrid, 2000.
