= Adriana Vega =

Spanish actress

- Born: Antonia López Arroyo; 25 February 1960 (age 65); Madrid, Spain
- Occupation: Actress
- Years active: 1978-2008

Antonia López Arroyo, known as Adriana Vega (born 25 February 1960) is a former Spanish actress.

In 1978 she appeared in the TV program Destino Argentina as a flight-attendant, and in December she appeared in Sumarísimo as a police woman, along Manolo Codeso, Alfonso del Real, Nené Morales, Silvia Aguilar and Taida Urruzola. Her first three films includes El violador y sus mujeres a la sombra de un recuerdo, Venus de fuego and Trampa sexual, directed by José Antonio Barrero, Germán Lorente and Manuel Esteba respectively. Then she appeared in Historia de S, Las siete magníficas y audaces mujeres (1979), El liguero mágico, Viciosas al desnudo (1980), El sexo sentido, La masajista vocacional and Los liantes (1981). Una gallina muy ponedora, El Cid cabreador, Juana la Loca... de vez en cuando (1983), Cuatro mujeres y un lío (1985), ¡¡Esto sí se hace!! (1987) and Jet Marbella Set (1991).

In May 1979, the magazine Interviú published naked photos.

She appeared on stage in the comedy Revistas del corazón, by Juan José Alonso Millán and starring Analía Gadé and José Luis de Vilallonga, and Juegos de sociedad along Flavia Zarzo.

== Filmography ==
- Arc of a Bird (2008) as Maria Ramirez
- Hospital Central (2008) as Ángela
- El comisario (2007)
- La casa de los líos (1999)
- Hostal Royal Manzanares (1996-1997) as Magda
- Hermanos de leche (1995)
- El tío del saco y el inspector Lobatón (1993)
- Gata por liebre (1992) as Doncella
- La noche del ejecutor (1992) as Elvira
- Jet Marbella Set (1991) as Paloma
- Brigada central (1990) as Amante de Lucas
- Trampa Infernal (1989) as Viviana
- Las locas historias (1988)
- Esto sí se hace (1987) as Adela
- Viva la risa (1987) as Paciente 2
- Reir más es imposible (1986)
- La comedia musical española (1985) as Zulema
- Cuatro mujeres y un lío (1985) as Manuela, Ramón's wife
- El recomendado (1985) as Luisa
- Atrapados en el miedo (1985) as Laura
- Hombres que rugen (1984) as Débora Dalbes
- Al este del oeste (1984) as Margaret Rose
- El Cid cabreador (1983) as Paquita
- Anillos de oro (1983) as Blanca
- Juana la Loca... de vez en cuando (1983) as Zoraida
- Una gallina muy ponedora (1982)
- ¡Gol...! y al mundial 82 (1981)
- Cariñosamente infiel (1981) as Ana
- Los liantes (1981) as Dolores
- El último harén (1981)
- La masajista vocacional (1981) as Eva
- El sexo sentido (1981) as Patricia
- Despido improcedente (1980) as Hija de Don Alberto
- Viciosas al desnudo (1980) as Hippie 1
- El liguero mágico (1980) as Alicia Cazorla
- Las siete magníficas y audaces mujeres (1979) as Chica leyendo el periódico
- El caminante (1979) as María
- Historia de 'S' (1979) as Clara
- El violador y sus mujeres a la sombra de un recuerdo (1978) as Merche
- Venus de fuego (1978) as Pilar
- Sumarísimo (1978) as Policía
- Trampa sexual (1978) as Marta
- Destino Argentina (1978)
