= National Heritage (film) =

1981 film

- Directed by: Luis García Berlanga
- Written by: Luis García Berlanga; Rafael Azcona
- Produced by: Alfredo Matas
- Starring: Luis Ciges
- Cinematography: Carlos Suárez
- Edited by: José Luis Matesanz
- Release date: May 1981
- Running time: 112 minutes
- Country: Spain
- Language: Spanish

National Heritage (Spanish: Patrimonio nacional) is a 1981 Spanish comedy film that was co-written and directed by Luis García Berlanga. It was entered into the 1981 Cannes Film Festival. The film was also selected as the Spanish entry for the Best Foreign Language Film at the 54th Academy Awards, but was not accepted as a nominee.

== Cast ==
- Luis Ciges as Segundo
- Luis Escobar as Marqués de Leguineche
- Agustín González as Padre Calvo
- José Luis López Vázquez as Luis José
- Alfredo Mayo as Nacho
- José Lifante as Goyo (as José Ruiz Lifante)
- Mary Santpere as Condesa
- Amparo Soler Leal as Chus
- Syliane Stella as Solange
- José Luis de Vilallonga as Álvaro
- José Luis Alonso
- Patricio Arnáiz
- Pedro Beltrán
- Julio Castronuovo
- Jaime Chávarri

== See also ==
- List of submissions to the 54th Academy Awards for Best Foreign Language Film
- List of Spanish submissions for the Academy Award for Best Foreign Language Film
