= Juana la Loca... de vez en cuando =

1983 film directed by José Ramón Larraz

- Directed by: José Ramón Larraz
- Screenplay by: Juan José Alonso Millán
- Story by: Juan José Alonso Millán
- Produced by: José Frade; Ricardo García Arrojo
- Starring: Lola Flores; Beatriz Elorrieta; Jaime Morey; Manolo Gómez Bur; Quique Camoiras; Juanito Navarro; Manuel Codeso; Paloma Hurtado; Adriana Vega; Ángel de Andrés; Roberto Camardiel; Adrián Ortega; Francisco Cecilio; Fernando Fernán Gómez; José Luis López Vázquez
- Cinematography: Raúl Artigot
- Edited by: Mercedes Alonso
- Music by: Teddy Bautista
- Production companies: Constan Films S.A.; José Frade Producciones Cinematográficas S.A.
- Distributed by: José Frade Producciones Cinematográficas S.A.
- Release date: 19 September 1983 (Madrid)
- Running time: 87 min
- Country: Spain
- Language: Spanish

Juana la Loca... de vez en cuando is a 1983 Spanish comedy film directed by José Ramón Larraz, written by Juan José Alonso Millán, scored by Teddy Bautista, and starring Lola Flores, Beatriz Elorrieta, Manolo Gómez Bur. It parodies the life of Joanna of Castile, Queen of Spain.

== Plot ==
The Catholic Monarchs of Spain Isabel I (Lola Flores) and Fernando II (José Luis López Vázquez) suffer when they see that their daughter Juana (Beatriz Elorrieta) has become republican. They make an effort to find a husband for their daughter given her sexual debauchery. Finally, they find a young playboy: Felipe I (Jaime Morey).

== Cast ==
- Lola Flores as Queen Isabel la Católica
- Beatriz Elorrieta as Infanta Joanna of Castile
- Jaime Morey as Felipe el Hermoso
- Manuel Gómez Bur as Cardinal Cisneros
- Quique Camoiras as Fray Tomás de Torquemada
- Juanito Navarro as Cristóbal Colón
- Manuel Codeso as Pinto Gorgorao
- Fernando Fernán Gómez as Sir Henry
- Paloma Hurtado as Infanta doña Isabel
- Adriana Vega as Zoraida
- Ángel de Andrés as Duque de Medina Sidonia
- Guillermo Montesinos as Infante don Juan
- Roberto Camardiel as Pregonero
- Adrián Ortega as Conde de Cabra 'Nalgaloca'
- Francisco Cecilio as Santo
- Manuel de Blas as Soldado
- Blaki as Beheaded Barber
- José Ruiz as Marqués de Priego
- José Luis López Vázquez as King Fernando el Católico
- José Jaime Espinosa as Wilfredo el Roñoso
- Fabián Conde as Fray Capullo
- Carla Duval as Doncella
- Víctor Israel as Torturador
- Antonio Requena as Posadero
- Alfonso Castizo as Marqués
- Javier Franquelo as Torturador
- Antonio Ozores as King of Portugal
- José Luis Chinchilla as Carcelero
- Simón Ramírez as Carcelero
