= Quique Camoiras =

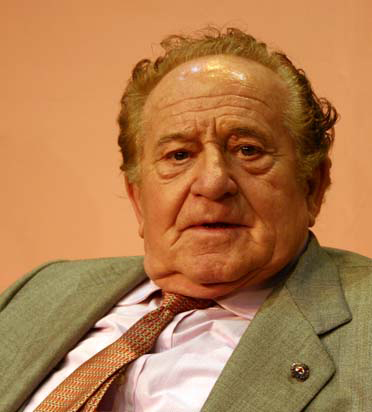
- Quique Camoiras in 2007
- Born: Enrique Pérez Camoiras; December 7, 1927; Madrid
- Died: March 1, 2012 (aged 84); Madrid
- Occupation: Actor

Enrique Pérez Camoiras, known as Quique Camoiras (7 December 1927 – 1 March 2012), was a Spanish actor.

He was born in 1934 in Madrid. In 1944 he made his debut in Xàtiva, Valencia, in Shanghái 38, and in 1948 he appeared in Rojo y negro, by Carlos Arévalo. In 1947 he formed a clown group with his brother Francisco. Between 1950 and 1960 he performed musical comedies on Don Armando Gresca, El hombre de rojo and Los marqueses de Matutes. He also appeared in films like La vida alrededor (1959), by Fernando Fernán Gómez, Tres perros locos, locos and La Corea (1976), La masajista vocacional (1981), Adulterio nacional (1982), Cristóbal Colón, de oficio descubridor (1982) y Juana la Loca... de vez en cuando (1983), La corte del Faraón (1985), La de Villadiego (1985), Humor cinco estrellas (1992), El sexólogo (1994) and Los ladrones van a la oficina (1995).

He started in 1934 and retired in 2007. He was married and had two children. He was admitted to Montepríncipe hospital on 22 February 2012 and died on 1 March from a intracerebral hemorrhage in Madrid at the age of 84.
