= Manuel Summers =

Spanish film director, screenwriter and actor

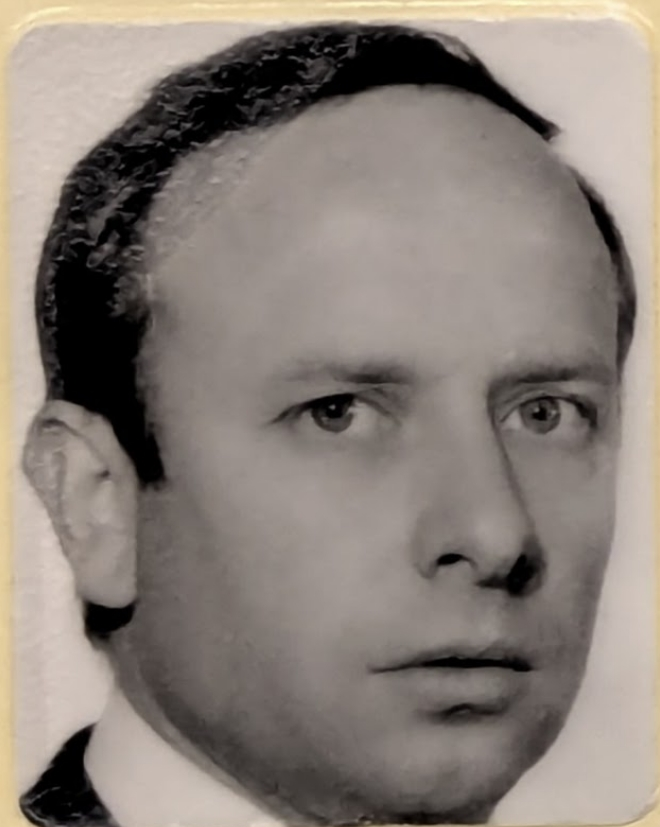
- Born: Manuel Summers Rivero; 26 March 1935; Sevilla, Spain
- Died: 12 June 1993 (aged 58); Sevilla, Spain
- Occupations: Film director, screenwriter
- Years active: 1959–1988

Manuel Summers Rivero (26 March 1935 – 12 June 1993) was a Spanish film director, screenwriter and actor.

== Biography ==
Summers was born in Seville, to a father of English origin. His mother was from Spain. His father, Francisco Summers e Isern (1902–1990), was a Francoist lawyer who served as civil governor of the provinces of Huelva in 1952–1956 and of Granada in 1956–1960. Manuel had two brothers, Francisco (born 1933) and Guillermo (born 1941), both journalists.

Summers moved to Madrid at a young age, where he worked as a journalist and caricaturist before enrolling as a student at Madrid's Institute for Cinematographic Sciences in 1957. He graduated from the institute with a diploma in 1959. Summers' earlier films, such as Del rosa al amarillo (1963) and La niña de luto (1964), have been described as bittersweet comedies with satirical undertones, and can be situated as examples of the "new Spanish cinema" of the 1960s. Problems with censorship and lack of popular success led Summers to gradually abandon the critical features of his earlier works as a director, and he went on to direct lighter comedies from the late 1960s. In total, Summers would direct twenty feature films during his career.

From 1960, Summers was married to Consuelo Rodríguez Márquez. Together, they had three children: Manolo, David, and Lucía. David would become the lead singer of the pop group Hombres G; Manuel Summers' last two films as a director, Sufre Mamón (1987) and Suéltate el pelo (1988), are centered around the group, and Summers also directed several of the group's music videos. He also had a daughter, Cheyenne Summers (born 1977), a voice actress, in a later relationship with the actress Beatriz Galbó (born 1951).

He died in Sevilla on 12 June 1993 aged 58 from colorectal cancer.

== Filmography ==
=== Filmography as Film Director ===
- El Viejecito (1959). Proyecto de fin de carrera para el Instituto de Ciencias Cinematográficas de Madrid.
- Del rosa al amarillo (1963). Award at San Sebastian Film Festival.
- La niña de luto (1964). Entered into the 1964 Cannes Film Festival.
- El juego de la oca (1966).
- Juguetes rotos (1966). Premio Especial del Jurado en el Festival de Cine de Valladolid.
- ¿Por qué te engaña tu marido? (1969).
- Urtáin, el rey de la selva... o así (1969).
- Adiós, cigüeña, adiós (1971).
- Ángeles gordos (1980). Coproduction with United States filmed in New York City.
- To er mundo é güeno (1982).
- To er mundo é... ¡mejó! (1982).
- La Biblia en pasta (1984).
- To er mundo é... ¡demasiao! (1985).
- Me hace falta un bigote (1986).
- Sufre Mamón (1987).
- Suéltate el pelo (1988).

=== Filmography as actor ===
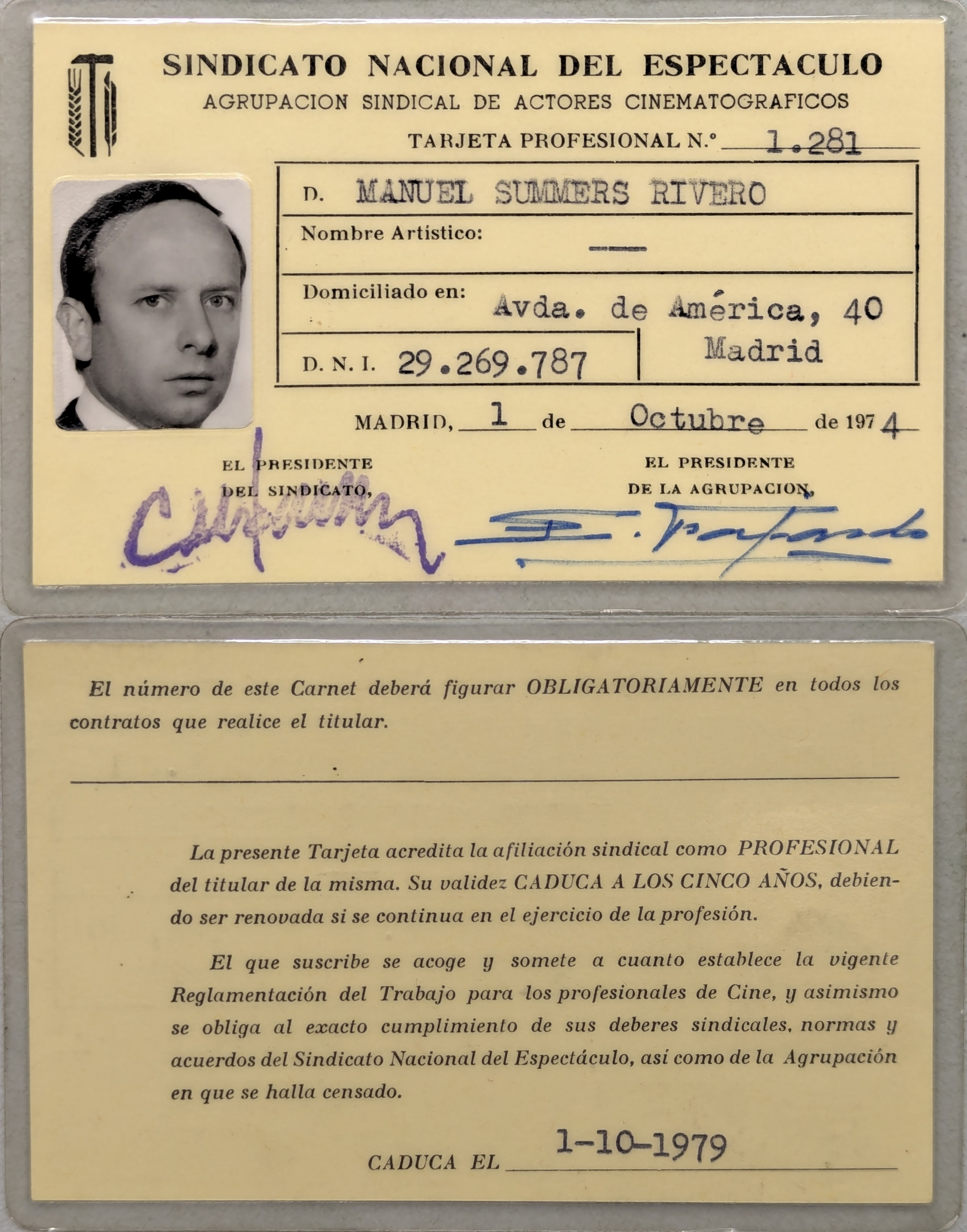
Manuel Summers actor's card from 1974.

- The Art of Living (1965)
- La niña de luto, by Manuel Summers.
- Aunque la hormona se vista de seda...., by Vicente Escrivá (1971).
- Black story. La historia negra de Peter P. Peter, by Pedro Lazaga (1971).
- Vente a Alemania, Pepe, by Pedro Lazaga (1971).
- Polvo eres..., by Vicente Escrivá (1974).
- De profesión: polígamo, by Angelino Fons (1975).
- Me hace falta un bigote, by Manuel Summers.

=== Filmography as producer ===
- La niña de luto, by Manuel Summers.

=== Filmography as screenwriter ===
- Del rosa al amarillo, by Manuel Summers.
- Urtáin, el rey de la selva... o así, by Manuel Summers.
