= Would You Marry Me? (film) =

- Directed by: Enrique Carreras
- Written by: Abel Santacruz
- Produced by: Cesáreo González
- Starring: Palito Ortega; Sonia Bruno; Eddie Pequenino
- Cinematography: Antonio Merayo
- Edited by: Jorge Gárate
- Music by: Tito Ribero
- Production companies: Producciones J.C.C; Suevia Films
- Distributed by: Argentina Sono Film; Suevia Films
- Release date: 18 September 1967
- Running time: 87 minutes
- Countries: Argentina; Spain
- Language: Spanish

Would You Marry Me? (Spanish:Quiere casarse conmigo...?!) is a 1967 Argentine-Spanish musical comedy film directed by Enrique Carreras and starring Palito Ortega, Sonia Bruno and Eddie Pequenino. The film's art direction was by Gori Muñoz.

== Cast ==
- Palito Ortega as Tito Crespo
- Sonia Bruno as Elena
- Eddie Pequenino as Zampognatto
- Tono Andreu as Nicanor
- Mariquita Gallegos as Patricia
- Juan Carlos Altavista as Mandadero
- Guido Gorgatti as Modisto
- Rosalía as Rosalía
- Enrique San Miguel
- Carlos Víctor Andriss
- Ignacio de Soroa
- Marta Cipriano
- Atilio Pozzobon
- José Ruzo
- Karina in a bit part
- Tatave Moulin
- Catalina Speroni
- Aída Luz as Agustina
- Fredy Tadeo as Fredy
- Rafael Diserio
- Nené Morales

== Bibliography ==
- Peter Cowie & Derek Elley. World Filmography: 1967. Fairleigh Dickinson University Press, 1977.
