= Luis García Berlanga =

Spanish film director and screenwriter (1921-2010)

The Most Excellent Luis García Berlanga
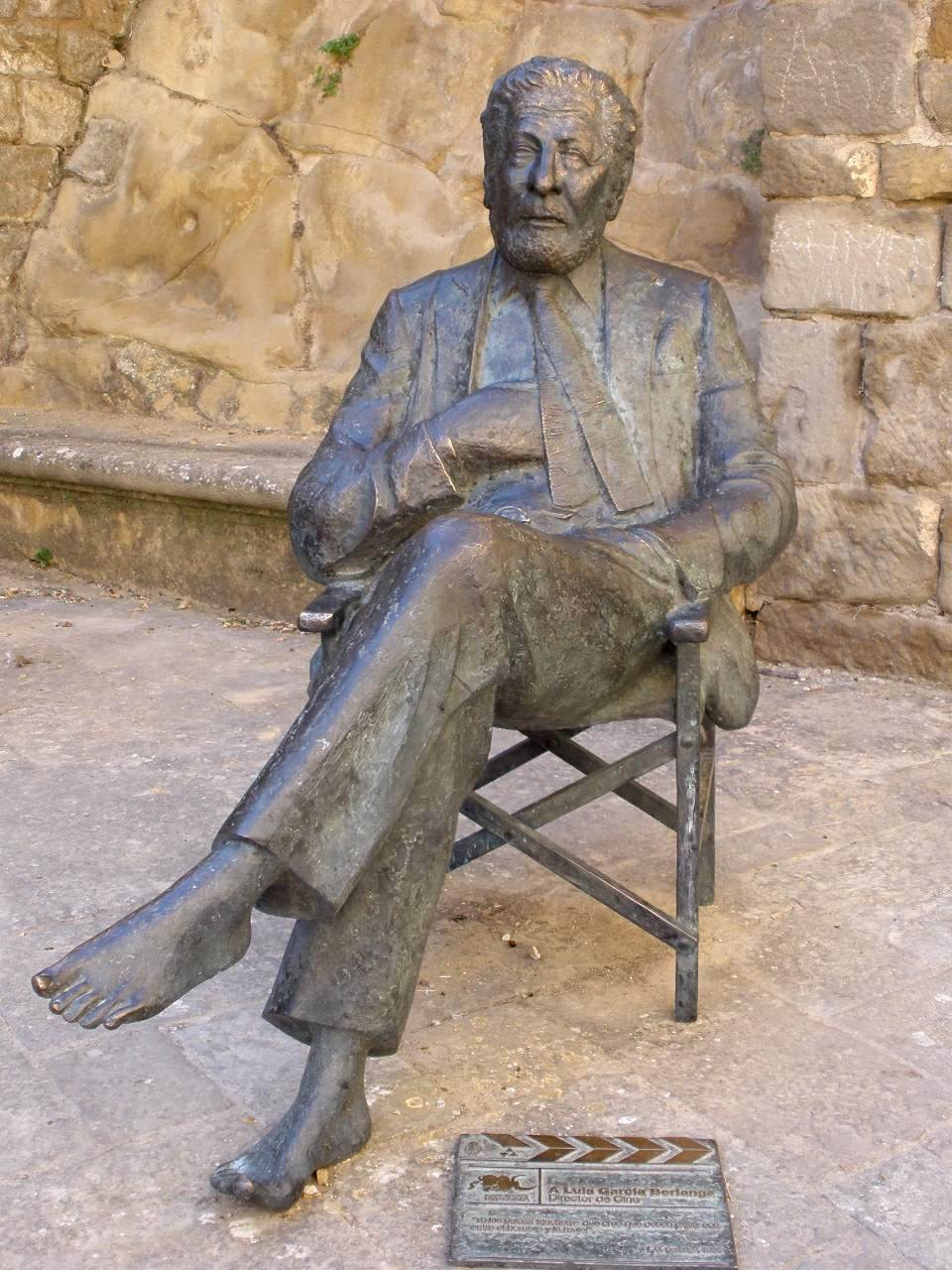
- Statue of García Berlanga in Sos del Rey Católico
- Born: Luis García-Berlanga Martí; 12 June 1921; Valencia, Spain
- Died: 13 November 2010 (aged 89); Pozuelo de Alarcón, Spain
- Occupations: Film director; Screenwriter
- Years active: 1948–2002
- Spouse: María Jesús Manrique de Aragón (m. 1954)
- Children: 4, including Carlos

Luis García-Berlanga Martí (12 June 1921 – 13 November 2010) was a Spanish film director and screenwriter. Acclaimed as a pioneer of modern Spanish cinema, his films are marked by social satire and acerbic critiques of Spanish culture under the Francoist dictatorship. These include Welcome Mr. Marshall! (1953), which won the International Prize (Comedy Film) at the 1953 Cannes Film Festival, Plácido (1961), nominated for an Academy Award for Best Foreign Language Film in 1962, and The Executioner (1963), winner of the FIPRESCI Prize at the 24th Venice International Film Festival He kept a long-time collaboration with screenwriter Rafael Azcona, with whom he co-wrote the scripts for seven of his films between 1961 and 1987.

== Early years ==
Berlanga was born on June 12, 1921, into an affluent family in the city of Valencia, on the east coast of Spain. His father was a Republican politician in the national parliament who was arrested and sentenced to death after the Spanish Civil War. He enrolled in the Blue Division in the Eastern Front of World War II because he was a loyal falangisy. In his youth, Berlanga studied law and philosophy, but in 1947 he decided to enter the Institute of Cinematographic Investigations and Experiences (Instituto de Investigaciones y Experiencias Cinematográficas) in Madrid.

== Career ==
His debut as a film director in 1951 was with the comedy That Happy Couple in which he worked with Juan Antonio Bardem. With Bardem, he is considered to be one of Spanish film renovators after the Spanish Civil War. They cofounded a film magazine, Objetivo, in 1953, which existed until 1956. The magazine contributed to the struggle for a censorship-free cinema in Francoist Spain.

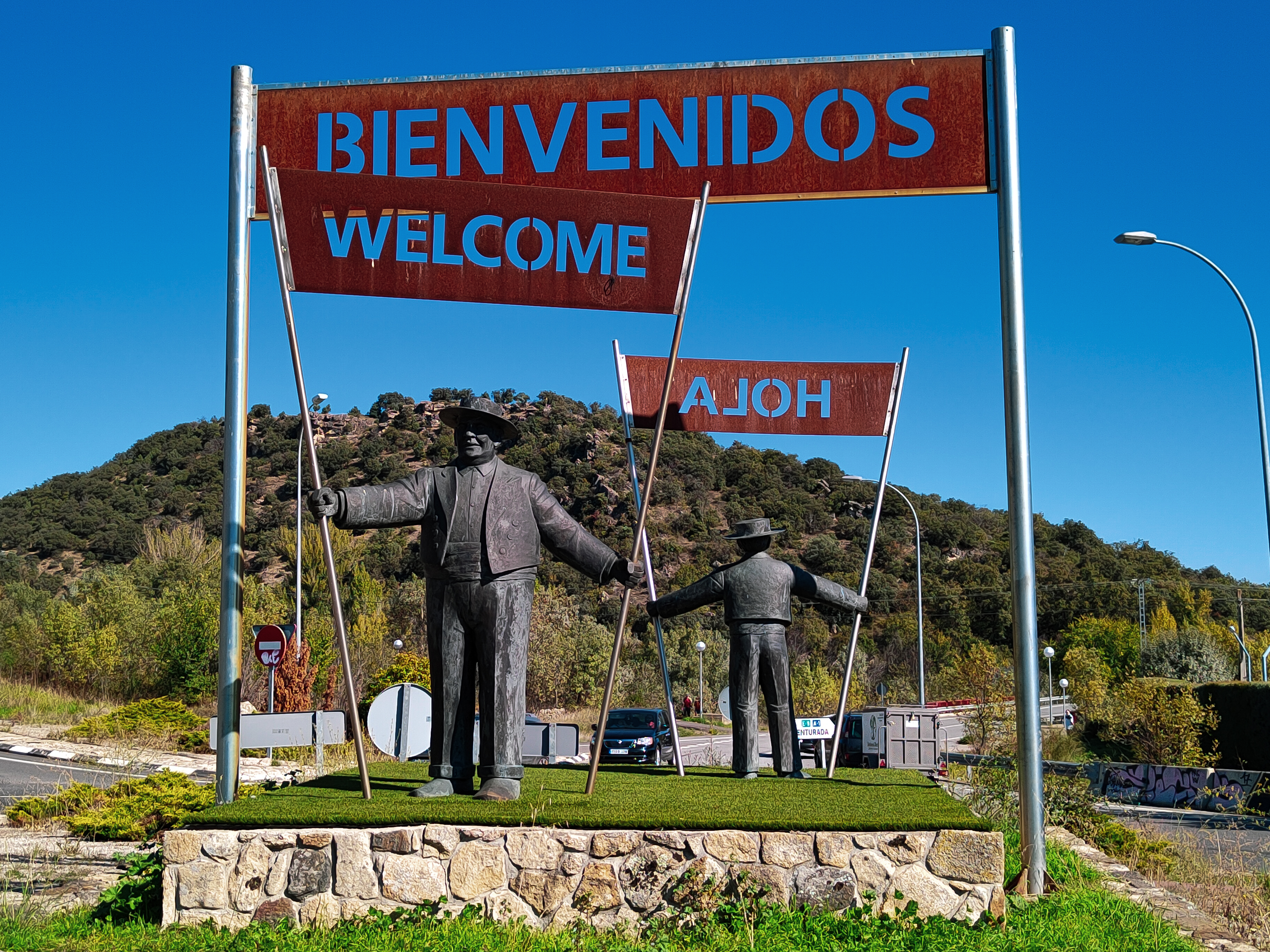
Sculpture depicting the scene of Americans being welcomed to the town in Welcome Mr. Marshall! (1953)

Among his films are masterpieces of Spanish cinema such as Welcome Mr. Marshall! (1953), in which he highlights the stereotypes held by both the Spanish and the Americans regarding the culture of the other, as well as a social criticism of 1950s Francoist Spain, and the black comedy The Executioner (1963), an acclaimed critical portrait about the capital punishment which stars Nino Manfredi.

Characteristic of his films are their sense of irony, the satires of different social and political situations and the use of the long take full of superimposed characters and dialogues. Since Welcome Mr. Marshall!, he introduced a mention to the Austro-Hungarian Empire in his films as a private joke. During the Francoist State, his ability to outwit the censors allowed him to make daring projects such as The Rocket from Calabuch (1956), starring Edmund Gwenn, and Miracles of Thursday (1957), with Richard Basehart in the lead role. His film Plácido (1961), a black comedy about poverty in which he collaborated for the first time with screenwriter Rafael Azcona, received a nomination for the Academy Award for Best Foreign Language Film. Plácido also entered into the 1962 Cannes Film Festival, as well as Long Live the Bride and Groom in 1970.

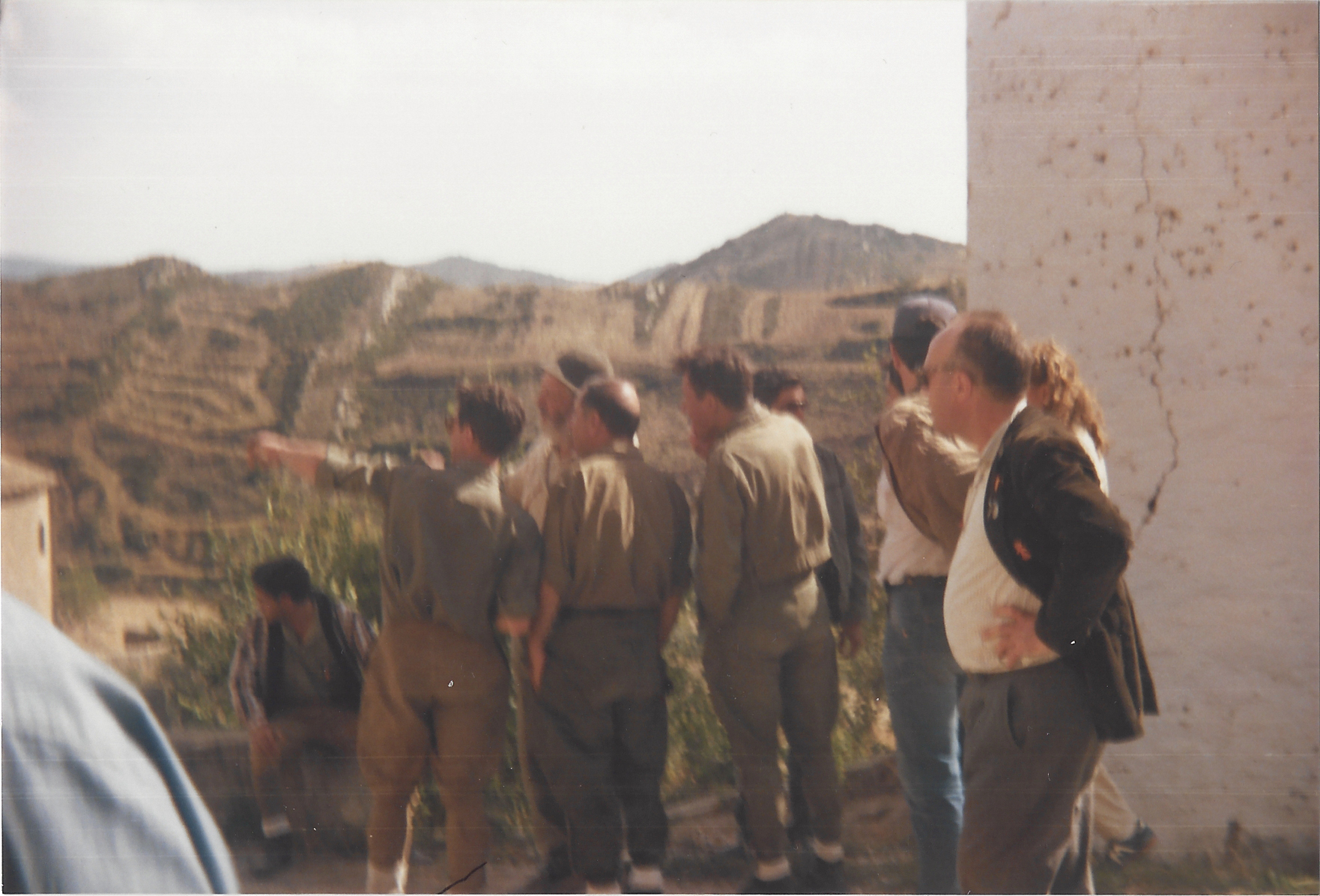
Filming of La vaquilla in summer 1984, Sos del Rey Católico.

In 1973 he filmed Grandeur nature (Life Size, 1974), a French-Italian-Spanish coproduction about a married man (Michel Piccoli) who falls in love with a female mannequin, which was not released in Spain until 1978 due to Franco's censorship. Its premiere in Italy provoked a demonstration by feminists who accused the film of presenting women as objects. However, other women defended it. This was followed by La escopeta nacional (1978), Patrimonio nacional (1981), which entered into the 1981 Cannes Film Festival, and Nacional III (1982), a satirical trilogy about the Leguineches, an impoverished aristocratic family. His 1985 film La vaquilla (The Heifer), a comedy about the Civil War, was the highest-grossing Spanish film in Spain at the time. Other films include the period comedy Boyfriend in Sight (1954), the Argentine production Las Pirañas (1967), and Moors and Christians (1987), his last collaboration with Azcona.

Throughout his career, Berlanga won international prizes at several important film festivals, including Cannes Film Festival and Venice Film Festival. He was nominated three times for the Cannes Film Festival's prestigious Palme d'Or award. In 1968, he was head of the jury at the 18th Berlin International Film Festival. At the Karlovy Vary International Film Festival he won a prize as one of the world's ten most prominent film directors. In the mid-70s he became director of the erotic literature collection La sonrisa vertical. From 1978 to 1982 he was president of the Filmoteca Española. In 1986 Berlanga was a key figure in the creation of the Spanish Film Academy and received the Prince of Asturias Award for the Arts "for collecting in all his work, with exemplary independence, a critical and smiling analysis of Spanish society."

His accolades also include the National Cinematography Prize (Premio Nacional de Cinematografía) in 1980 and the Italian Commendatore Order, the Gold Medal of Merit in the Fine Arts (Medalla de Oro de las Bellas Artes) in 1982, the Number One award for European cinema at the EuropaCinema film festival in Rimini in 1985, the membership at the Royal Academy of Fine Arts of San Fernando in 1988, the honorary doctorate of the Complutense University of Madrid in 1989, the Goya Award for Best Director for his 1993 comedy Everyone Off to Jail, the honorary doctorate of the University of Valencia in 1997, and the Gold Medal of Merit in Labour (Medalla al Mérito en el Trabajo) in 2002.

== Personal life and death ==
He was married in 1954 with María Jesús Manrique, and they had four sons. Two of his sons died in Madrid relatively young from liver diseases: Carlos Berlanga on 5 June 2002, at the age of 42, and Jorge Berlanga on 9 June 2011, at 52 years old.

Berlanga died of natural causes in Madrid on 13 November 2010, at the age of 89.

His closed coffin was on display at the Spanish Film Academy in Madrid before its burial in Pozuelo de Alarcón. Crowds of actors, artists, politicians and other admirers lined up to pay their respects. The president of the Academy Álex de la Iglesia said "he changed my life", while the director José Luis García Sánchez would affirm that Berlanga "dignified an entire aesthetic tradition. On his tomb it should be read, instead of RIP, The End." Filmmaker Pedro Almodóvar, who also came to the funeral, declared: "We always speak about Billy Wilder. If Berlanga had made films in another language, the whole world would be paying tribute to him." And noted that Berlanga was "one of the best representatives of the Spanish culture of the 20th century, a generation of great illusionists who knew how to survive in a sordid Spain with very strict censorship."

== Legacy ==
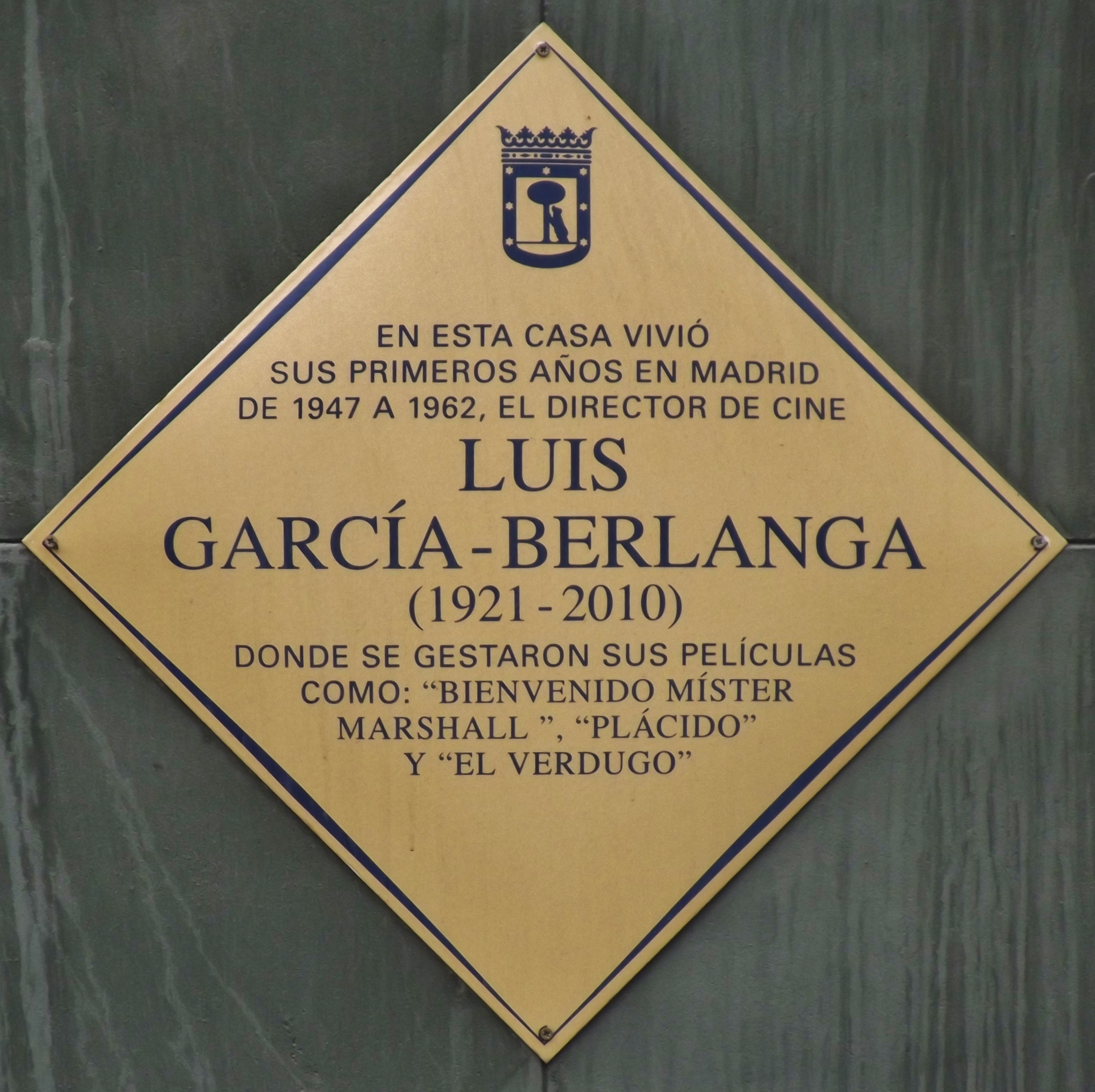
Commemorative plaque to Luis García-Berlanga in Madrid.

Berlanga had an influence in many contemporary Spanish filmmakers, which include Santiago Segura, Javier Fesser, Borja Cobeaga, Alberto Caballero, and Víctor García León. Almodóvar also admitted that his cinema is indebted to Berlanga's: "When making a Spanish comedy, it is almost impossible to avoid the influence of Berlanga and Azcona. With Berlanga, you learn the difference between a master and yourself."

The term 'berlanguian', which refers to the surreal, to what is difficult to explain but absolutely possible within the imagination and way of being of the Spanish, has been admitted by the Royal Spanish Academy. French actor Michel Piccoli, who worked with Berlanga in Grandeur nature (1974) and París-Tombuctú (1999), said of him: "He's Don Quixote" and added: "Well, he could also be Sancho." Francisco Franco, upon being told by his ministers that Berlanga was an anarchist, a Bolshevik and a communist, uttered the following words: "He is much worse than that; he is a bad Spaniard."

In 2008, Berlanga deposited in the Caja de las Letras number 1034 of the Instituto Cervantes an envelope containing a secret, which he asked not to be revealed until 12 June 2021, when the centenary of his birth would be celebrated. On 9 June 2021, three days before the centenary, his grandchildren Fidel and Jorge opened the box and revealed the secret contents of the envelope: an unpublished script titled Viva Rusia!, co-written by the filmmaker himself, his son Jorge, Rafael Azcona and Manuel Hidalgo Ruiz, a project for the fourth film of the Leguineche family saga that was never filmed.

In 2011, Correos, the Spanish postal service, issued a sheet of stamps in tribute to him and the screenwriter Rafael Azcona as part of its Spanish cinema series. Ten years later, to celebrate the centenary of Berlanga's birth, the company issues a new stamp on his figure.

In 2012, the Berlanga Film Museum (BFM) was inaugurated as an online museum dedicated exclusively to the dissemination of his work.

The Valencian Audiovisual Awards were renamed the Berlanga Awards by the regional ministry of Education, Culture and Sport between 2021 and 2024 to pay homage to the Valencia-born filmmaker.

From February to June 2022 the Spanish Film Academy opened in Valencia the exhibition Berlanguiano. Luis García Berlanga (1921-2021). In December, the Spanish Ministry of Culture acquired the Berlanga Archive, made up of 74 boxes, containing photographs, scripts, correspondence, awards, drawings and personal objects. The material is kept in the facilities of the Filmoteca Española, an entity dependent on the Institute of Cinematography and Audiovisual Arts (ICAA) that is in charge of its conservation and dissemination.

== Filmography ==
=== Films ===
| Year | Title | Director | Writer | Notes |
|---|---|---|---|---|
| 1953 | Welcome Mr. Marshall! | Yes | Yes | |
| 1953 | That Happy Couple | Yes | Yes | Co-written and co-directed with Juan Antonio Bardem |
| 1954 | Boyfriend in Sight | Yes | Yes | |
| 1956 | The Rocket from Calabuch | Yes | Yes | |
| 1957 | Miracles of Thursday | Yes | Yes | |
| 1958 | Familia provisional | No | Yes | |
| 1961 | Plácido | Yes | Yes | |
| 1962 | Las cuatro verdades (segment "Death and the Lumberjack") | Yes | Yes | |
| 1963 | The Executioner | Yes | Yes | |
| 1964 | El extraño viaje | No | Idea | |
| 1967 | Las pirañas | Yes | Yes | Argentine film |
| 1970 | Long Live the Bride and Groom | Yes | Yes | |
| 1974 | Grandeur nature | Yes | Yes | French film |
| 1978 | La escopeta nacional | Yes | Yes | |
| 1978 | Una noche embarazosa | No | Yes | |
| 1981 | Patrimonio nacional | Yes | Yes | |
| 1982 | Nacional III | Yes | Yes | |
| 1985 | La vaquilla | Yes | Yes | |
| 1987 | Moros y Cristianos | Yes | Yes | |
| 1993 | Everyone Off to Jail | Yes | Yes | |
| 1999 | París-Tombuctú | Yes | Yes | Final feature-length film |

==== As associate producer ====
- Tenemos 18 años (1959)

=== Short films ===
| Year | Title | Director | Writer | Notes |
|---|---|---|---|---|
| 1948 | Paseos por una guerra antigua | Yes | Yes | Documentary short film co-written and co-directed with Juan Antonio Bardem, Augustín Navarro & Florentino Soria |
| 1948 | Tres cantos | Yes | Yes | |
| 1949 | El circo | Yes | Yes | |
| 1959 | Se vende un tranvía | No | Yes | Also supervisor |
| 1963 | La muerte y el leñador | Yes | Yes | Segment of the anthology film Three Fables of Love |
| 2002 | El sueño de la maestra | Yes | Yes | Final short film |

=== Television ===
| Year | Title | Director | Writer | Notes |
|---|---|---|---|---|
| 1995 | Villarriba y villabajo | No | Creator | Televisión Española series; 25 episodes Co-creator with José Luis García Berlanga & Antonio Oliver |
| 1997 | Blasco Ibáñez | Yes | Yes | Televisión Española miniseries; 2 episodes |

==== Acting roles ====
| Year | Title | Role | Notes |
|---|---|---|---|
| 1959 | Se vende un tranvia | Comprador de la baliza aerostática | Short Film; Uncredited |
| 1967 | Las pirañas | Espectador de cine | Uncredited |
| 1968 | Días de viejo color | Mr. Marshall | |
| 1968 | No somos de piedra | Guardía Urbano | |
| 1968 | Tuset Street | Aparicio | |
| 1969 | Sharon vestida de rojo | Victor | |
| 1973 | Apunte sobre Ana | | Short film |
| 1977 | Tigres de papel | Matón ultraderechista | Uncredited |
| 1980 | Cuentos eróticos | Hombre del metro | |
| 1980 | Nostalgia de comedia muda | | Short film |
| 1981 | Tragala perro | | |
| 1981 | Retratos en el retrete | | Short film |
| 1982 | Un pasota con corbata | | |
| 1984 | Dinero negro | Peris | |
| 1994 | La vida siempre es corta | | Short film |
| 1998 | Ni contigo ni sin tí | Dios | TV Series; Episode "Cuestión de fe" |
| 2001 | Corazón de bombón | Berlanga | |
| 2001 | El apagon | | Short film |
| 2001 | Hola Artemio | | |
| 2001 | Extranjeros de sí mismos | Himself | Documentary film |

== Awards and nominations ==
=== Academy Awards ===
| Year | Category | Film | Result |
|---|---|---|---|
| 1962 | Best Foreign Language Film | Plácido | Nominated |

=== Cannes Film Festival ===
| Year | Category | Film | Result |
|---|---|---|---|
| 1953 | Grand Prize of the Festival | Welcome Mr. Marshall! | Nominated |
| 1953 | Special Mention - For the Screenplay | Welcome Mr. Marshall! | Won |
| 1953 | International Prize - Comedy Film | Welcome Mr. Marshall! | Won |
| 1961 | Palme d'Or | Plácido | Nominated |
| 1970 | Palme d'Or | Long Live the Bride and Groom | Nominated |
| 1981 | Palme d'Or | National Heritage | Nominated |

=== Venice Film Festival ===
| Year | Category | Film | Result |
|---|---|---|---|
| 1956 | Golden Lion | The Rocket from Calabuch | Nominated |
| 1956 | OCIC Award | The Rocket from Calabuch | Won |
| 1964 | Golden Lion | The Executioner | Nominated |
| 1964 | FIPRESCI Prize | The Executioner | Won |

=== Goya Awards ===
| Year | Category | Film | Result |
|---|---|---|---|
| 1988 | Goya Award for Best Original Screenplay | Moors and Christians | Nominated |
| 1994 | Goya Award for Best Original Screenplay | Everyone Off to Jail | Won |
| 1994 | Goya Award for Best Director | Everyone Off to Jail | Won |

=== Prince or Princess of Asturias Award for the Arts ===
| Year | Result |
|---|---|
| 1986 | Won |

=== Mar del Plata International Film Festival ===
| Year | Category | Film | Result |
|---|---|---|---|
| 1999 | International Competition | París-Tombuctú | Nominated |
| 1999 | OCIC Award | París Tombuctú | Won |
| 1999 | FIPRESCI Prize | París Tombuctú | Won |

=== Valladolid International Film Festival ===
| Year | Category | Film | Result |
|---|---|---|---|
| 1958 | Honorable Mention | Miracles of Thursday | Won |

=== Sant Jordi Awards ===
| Year | Category | Film | Result |
|---|---|---|---|
| 1962 | Best Spanish Director | Plácido | Won |
| 1962 | Best Film | Plácido | Won |
| 1964 | Best Film | The Executioner | Won |
| 1981 | Best Film | National Heritage | Won |

=== Fotogramas de Plata ===
| Year | Category | Film | Result |
|---|---|---|---|
| 1999 | Lifetime Achievement Award | - | Won |

=== Ondas Awards ===
| Year | Category | Film | Result |
|---|---|---|---|
| 1999 | Cinemanía Award | - | Won |

=== Círculo de Escritores Cinematográficos ===
| Year | Category | Film | Result |
|---|---|---|---|
| 1952 | "Jimeno" Revelation Award | That Happy Couple | Won |
| 1954 | Best Original Story | Welcome Mr. Marshall! | Won |
| 1960 | Best Original Story | Miracles of Thursday | Won |
| 1962 | Best Director | Plácido | Won |
| 1964 | Best Original Story | The Executioner | Won |
| 1994 | Best Director | Everyone Off to Jail | Won |

== Honours ==
- Gold Medal of Merit in the Fine Arts (Kingdom of Spain, 28 February 1982)
- Gold Medal of Merit in Labour (Kingdom of Spain, 13 December 2002)

== See also ==
- Café Gijón (Madrid)
