= Luis Ciges =

Spanish actor (1921–2002)

- Born: Luis Ciges Martínez; 10 May 1921; Madrid, Spain
- Died: 11 December 2002 (aged 81); Madrid, Spain
- Occupation: Actor
- Years active: 1958–2002

Luis Ciges Martínez (10 May 1921 – 11 December 2002) was a Spanish film actor. His father was Manuel Cigues Aparicio, a politician who was shot in August 1936 as he worked as the civil gobernor of Ávila.

He received the Tribute Award at the CEC Awards in 1996, He won the Goya Award for Best Supporting Actor for his performance in Así en el cielo como en la tierra on the same year.
