= Fabio McNamara =

Spanish artist (born 1957)

Fabio de Miguel (so as: Fanny McNamara and Fabio McNamara; born 8 January 1957, Madrid) is a Spanish artist.

He grew up in the Alameda de Osuna area of Madrid. He was involved in La Movida Madrileña like many of his friends, including Pedro Almodóvar, Olvido Gara (Alaska), Tino Casal and Costus. He has collaborated with them in films and songs.

He later focused on his pop art paintings, which he has exposed in fairs like ARCO and he has talked about religiosity.

== Discography ==
- Fanny y los + (1986) - Mini-LP.
- A tutti plein (1995) - CD.
- Rockstation (2000) - CD.
- Mi correo electronic... oh! (2000) - CDSG.
- Mariclones (2006) - CD.
- Dangerous Bimbow (2007) - CDSG.
- Requiebros de mujer en el burlaero (2007) - CD.
- El imperio contra Paca (2011) - CD.
- Celebritis (2009) – Digital single.
- Bye Bye Supersonic (2009) - CD.

== Filmography ==
- Pepi, Luci, Bom , 1980
- Labyrinth of Passion , 1982
- Dark Habits , 1983
- Historias paralelas,(shortfilm), 1983
- Law of Desire , 1987
- Tie Me Up! Tie Me Down! , 1990
- Kety no para, (TV), 1997
