= Pepi, Luci, Bom and Other Girls on the Heap =

1980 film by Pedro Almodóvar

- Theatrical release poster
- Spanish: Pepi, Luci, Bom y otras chicas del montón
- Directed by: Pedro Almodóvar
- Written by: Pedro Almodóvar
- Produced by: Pepón Coromina; Ester Rambal; Pastora Delgado
- Starring: Carmen Maura; Eva Siva; Alaska; Félix Rotaeta
- Cinematography: Paco Femenia
- Edited by: Pepe Salcedo
- Music by: Alaska y los Pegamoides
- Production company: Fígaro Films
- Distributed by: Alenda S.A.
- Release dates: 19 September 1980 (SSIFF); 27 October 1980 (Spain)
- Running time: 81 minutes
- Country: Spain
- Language: Spanish
- Budget: ESP 6 million (USD$46,000)
- Box office: ESP 43 million (USD$332,089)

Pepi, Luci, Bom and Other Girls on the Heap (Spanish: Pepi, Luci, Bom y otras chicas del montón), also known as Pepi, Luci, Bom and Other Girls Like Mom, is a 1980 Spanish black comedy film written and directed by Pedro Almodóvar. Starring Carmen Maura, Eva Siva, Alaska and Félix Rotaeta, the plot follows the wild adventures of three friends: Pepi, a modern young woman; Luci, a mousy, masochistic housewife; and Bom, a lesbian punk rock singer.

Pepi, Luci, Bom is Almodóvar's first feature film. It was shot in 16 mm and blown up to 35 mm for its theatrical release. It became a cult film, emblematic of La Movida Madrileña, a period characterised by a sense of cultural and sexual freedom.

== Plot ==
Pepi is a young woman from a middle-class family who lives alone in a Madrid apartment and grows cannabis on her balcony, supplementing her income with money sent by her parents. She is visited by a policeman who lives across the street and has spotted her marijuana plants while spying on her through binoculars. Pepi offers anal sex in exchange for the policeman's silence, but he rapes her vaginally instead, ruining her plan to sell her virginity. Seeking revenge, Pepi enlists the help of her friend Bom, a teenage punk rock singer, and her band, Bomitoni. (Note: Bom and Toni, and also a pun on vomitoni, or "big puke") Wearing Madrilenian costumes and singing a zarzuela, Pepi's friends beat up the policeman one night. However, the next day, Pepi realises that they had attacked the policeman's innocent twin brother by mistake.

Undaunted, Pepi befriends the policeman's docile wife, Luci, from Murcia, under the guise of receiving knitting lessons. Pepi's plan is to corrupt Luci and take her away from the physically abusive policeman. During the first knitting class, Bom arrives at Pepi's apartment to use the bathroom, and at Pepi's suggestion, urinates on Luci. The masochistic Luci enjoys Bom's aggressive behaviour, and the two women become lovers. Back home, Luci has an argument with her husband after she confronts him for raping Pepi. When he threatens to whip her, Luci, with a renewed sense of liberation, leaves her husband and moves in with Bom.

Pepi, Luci and Bom immerse themselves in Madrid's youth scene, attending parties, nightclubs, concerts and meeting outrageous characters. At a Bomitoni concert, Bom sings a song dedicated to Luci, titled "Murciana marrana" ("The Slut from Murcia"). Luci becomes a proud groupie. The highlight of one of the parties is a penis size contest called Erecciones Generales ("General Erections"), a competition to determine the largest, most svelte, most inordinate penis. The winner is granted the opportunity to do whatever he wants with whomever he wants. He selects Luci to give him oral sex, which makes her the most envied woman at the party.

Pepi is forced to find work as her father cuts her off financially. She becomes a creative writer for advertising spots designing ads for sweating, menstruating dolls and multi-purpose panties that absorb urine and can double as a dildo. Pepi also begins to write a script which will be the story of lesbian lovers Luci and Bom. Meanwhile, the chauvinist policeman is desperately looking for his wife. He takes advantage of naive neighbour Charito, who is in love with Juan, his twin brother. Pretending to be Juan, the policeman slaps, then sexually assaults Charito.

The policeman eventually finds Luci leaving a disco and kidnaps her from her two friends. He gives Luci a severe beating that sends her to the hospital, where Pepi and Bom visit her. Bruised and bandaged in her hospital bed, Luci tells Bom that she has reconciled with her sadistic and tyrannical husband, as she has always craved his brutality. Bom feels lost without Luci and laments that her band has split up and that pop music has gone out of fashion. Pepi has the solution to both problems: Bom should move in with Pepi as her bodyguard and start singing boleros.

== Cast ==
- Carmen Maura as Pepi
- Félix Rotaeta as the policeman and Juan
- Alaska as Bom
- Eva Siva as Luciana "Luci"
- Concha Grégori as Charito
- Kiti Manver as the model/singer
- Cecilia Roth as the girl in the panties commercial
- Julieta Serrano as the woman who plays The Lady of the Camellias
- Cristina Sánchez Pascual (credited as Cristina S. Pascual) as the bearded woman
- Fabio McNamara (credited as Fabio de Miguel) as Roxy Burton
- Assumpta Serna (credited as Asumpta Rodes) as Nuria

== Production ==
=== Casting ===
Carmen Maura took the leading role of Pepi and Félix Rotaeta portrayed the abusive policeman. Both were instrumental in the film's development. Maura was already an established actress, having found film success with Fernando Colomo's Tigres de papel (1977). She became Almodóvar's reference actress in the first half of his career. Bom is played by Olvido Gara, then a teenage punk singer, who inspired the character she plays. Gara went on to take the artistic name of Alaska. She has enjoyed a successful artistic career as a singer, first in Alaska y Dinarama and later with Fangoria.

Many actors that appear in minor roles went on to play more important ones in Almodóvar's subsequent films: Kiti Manver (Women on the Verge of a Nervous Breakdown) plays a hot-tempered, Andalusian rock singer; Julieta Serrano (Dark Habits); Cecilia Roth (All About My Mother); Fabio MacNamara (Labyrinth of Passion), a singer and painter, plays a transvestite Avon lady; Cristina Sánchez Pascual (Dark Habits) appears as a high-pitch bearded woman frustrated in a marriage to a homosexual man, in a parody of Tennessee Williams's Cat on a Hot Tin Roof. Assumpta Serna (Matador) has a non-speaking cameo, while Almodóvar himself appears as the host in the general erection contest.

=== Filming ===
Pepi, Luci, Bom is Almodóvar's first feature film. He had previously made only short films in Super 8, a short in 16 mm titled Salome and a feature-length film in super 8 titled Folle, folle, fólleme, Tim (1978) (Fuck Me, Fuck Me, Fuck Me, Tim), none of which had a soundtrack.

The genesis of Pepi, Luci, Bom was a story written by Almodóvar called General Erections published in 1978 in the magazine El Víbora. General Erections was a comic parody of the 1977 general elections in Spain. The idea to take that story and develop it into a film was born out of his collaboration with the theatrical group Los Goliardos. Performing with them in a small role in the play Dirty Hands by Jean-Paul Sartre, Almodóvar met Maura and Rotaeta, who encouraged him to make a film out of General Erections. Almodóvar rewrote the story and changed the title to Pepi, Luci, Bom y otras chicas del montón (Pepi, Luci, Bom and Other Girls on the Heap).

The initial budget was only 500,000 pesetas that Maura and Rotaeta helped to collect. At the time, Almodóvar was working for Telefónica, Spain's national telephone company, as an administrative employee, therefore the shooting took place on weekends with a group of volunteers. Without the backing of a studio, Almodóvar was forced to make extensive use of location shooting. The real-life residence of gay pop artist painters Costus (Juan Carrero and Enrique Naya), who also appear in the film, served as the place where Luci and Bom set up their home.

The shooting was chaotic; it began in 1978 and lasted a year and a half. Due to the lack of financial means, it took an entire year to produce a film of only 50 minutes. This was insufficient for commercial distribution length. More money was needed and backing from Pepón Coromina, a Catalan producer, allowed Almodóvar to add 30 more minutes of film, shot over the following six months of 1980. The film was blown from 16 mm to a 35 mm format to allow its theatrical release. The crew lacked experience and the cameraman cut off some heads, particularly during the general erections contest scene. The long and chaotic shooting created problems in continuity. When filming started, Alaska was 15 and by the time the filming wrapped, she was 17. The first scene when Pepi goes to answer the door to the policeman was shot in June 1979, she opened it in December 1979 and they sat together in June 1980.

== Theme ==
The central theme of the film—female resilience, independence, and solidarity—would be a constant throughout Almodóvar's career, albeit better depicted in his later and more accomplished films. As with the female characters in Women on the Verge of a Nervous Breakdown (1988), All About My Mother (1999) and Volver (2006), Pepi and Bom are self-sufficient, independent and their friendship is shown as more important than any sexual or love attachment. By contrast, men are either non-existent or presented unsympathetically, such as the policeman in Pepi, Luci, Bom, Raimunda's abusive husband in Volver or Pepa's unfaithful lover in Women on the Verge of a Nervous Breakdown. Although Bom and Luci form a lesbian couple, their story is ultimately less important than Pepi and Bom's friendship. While the friendship of these two remains strong, Bom and Luci's affair ends when the latter returns to a heterosexual life of abuse with her husband.

Two scenes put Pepi and Bom's closeness in the foreground. Contrasting Luci's troubled household, Pepi is presented cooking Bom's favourite dish: Bacalao al pil pil. The film aptly closes with the two friends looking ahead to a new life shared together as roommates, helping to support each other. The film also takes on other themes frequent in Almodóvar's filmography: sexual heterodoxy, drug addiction and a love of pop culture.

== Genre ==
Among Almodóvar's films, Pepi, Luci, Bom, his first, is the one who takes more explicitly comedy as a genre. All the others (with the possible exception of 2013's I'm So Excited!) incorporate elements of melodrama. The characters are shown as comic archetypes. Pepi is the independent witty modern woman. There is the nasty radical policeman. Bom is shown as a perverse rebellious teenager and Luci as the abused housewife.

The amateurish presentation of the film and its crude humour also sets the film apart from the rest of Almodovar's filmography. Even in Labyrinth of Passion (1982), Almodovar's subsequent film, comic elements are not presented so bluntly. By then, there was also a huge improvement in plot structure and filmography over his first film.

== Analysis ==
The comic book origins of the film are evident in its loose structure, provocative vulgarity and the intertitles made by Spanish illustrator Ceesepe, then an unknown member of La Movida Madrileña. The film was plagued by financial and technical problems: Almodóvar claimed humorously that "when a film has only one or two, it is considered an imperfect film, while when there is a profusion of technical flaws, it is called style. That's what I said joking around when I was promoting the film, but I believe 'that that was closer to the truth."

Stylistically, the film owes a debt to Paul Morrissey's first films and above all to John Waters' Pink Flamingos (1972). Almodóvar confronts the spectator with unexpected outrageous situations, including a lesbian golden shower scene in the middle of a knitting lesson.

The technical and plot defects of the films are apparent, particularly when compared with Almodóvar's subsequent polished and complex works. However, the film captured the spirit of its time, La Movida Madrileña, presenting Madrid as an exciting city where anything goes.

The film centres on youth culture, showing it as wild, frivolous, adventurous and free from taboos. There is political symbolism in the right-wing, old macho attitudes of the policeman, who represent the disappearing Francoist society and is presented unsympathetically. Pepi and Bom stand for Spain's modern woman, the wild new face of a liberated democratic Spain. Luci is the self-sacrificing Spanish housewife, trapped between the old and new Spain. She is a masochist who yearns for the brutality of the past.

Blurring the limits of sexual identity, transsexual characters appear in many Almodóvar's films. Pepi, Luci, Bom features a drag queen named Roxy, played by Fabio McNamara, Almodóvar's singing partner in a glam rock parody duo. The comic elements of the film defy good taste and are bluntly presented. Almódovar does not linger in the oddness of the sexual relationship between a traditional housewife in her forties and a rebellious punk teenager, which is presented without judgment as nothing out of the ordinary. Pepi, Luci, Bom is clearly an amateurish film; a first-time director, Almodóvar learned his craft as he made it.

== Soundtrack ==
The film opens with the song "Do the Swim" by Little Nell, singing co-star of Jim Sharman's 1975 film The Rocky Horror Picture Show. The counterculture song "Murciana marrana", written by Fabio McNamara, is prominently featured, performed by Alaska and Los Pegamoides with a mixture of vulgarity and absurdity. The film closes with a Latin-American song "Estaba escrito" by Chilean singer Monna Bell.

== DVD release ==
Pepi, Luci, Bom is available on Region 2 DVD in Spanish with English subtitles. It was released in the United Kingdom as part of The Almodóvar Collection (Vol. 1). The film has not been released on DVD in the United States.

== Reception ==
The film premiered on 19 September 1980 at the San Sebastián International Film Festival in the section devoted to new directors. It later toured the independent circuits and then spent four years on the late-night showing of the Alphaville Theater in Madrid.

Reviews in Spain were mostly negative, objecting to the film's frivolity and vulgar humour. Pedro Crespo, in the conservative newspaper ABC, described the film a "merely a variation on the age old tradition of vulgar comedy transformed into a contemporary language". Diego Galán, in El País, praised the film concluding, "We are in the presence of an astonishing and up to now, unique work. Almodóvar has made his first professional full-length film and in so doing has undermined the most respected taboos of our foolish society". The Spanish newspaper El Periódico, described Almodóvar as "a stubbornly passionate defender of substandard movies".

Pepi, Luci, Bom was released in the United States in 1992, only after Almodóvar became a famous art house film director. The reaction of American critics to the film was, on the whole, hostile. It was generally rebuked for its thematic and formal inconsistency. Janet Maslin of The New York Times considered the film a "rough unfunny comedy notable for its bathroom jokes, humorous rape scene and abysmal home movie cinematography". She found that Almodóvar's "daring is limited to shock value of a very adolescent variety, and to plot turns that are better described than seen". Rita Kempley of The Washington Post called it an "amateurish directorial debut, a smutty sexual sideshow most safely viewed in a full body condom".

The film cost 6 million pesetas (approximately €36,000) and grossed 43 million pesetas (€260,000) in its initial release in Madrid. With its many kitsch elements, campy style, outrageous humour, and open sexuality, the film became emblematic of a cultural movement of its time, La Movida Madrileña. It amassed a cult following and established Almodóvar as an agent provocateur.

On the review aggregator website Rotten Tomatoes, the film holds an approval rating of 50% based on eight reviews.
