= Pedro Almodóvar =

Spanish filmmaker (born 1949)

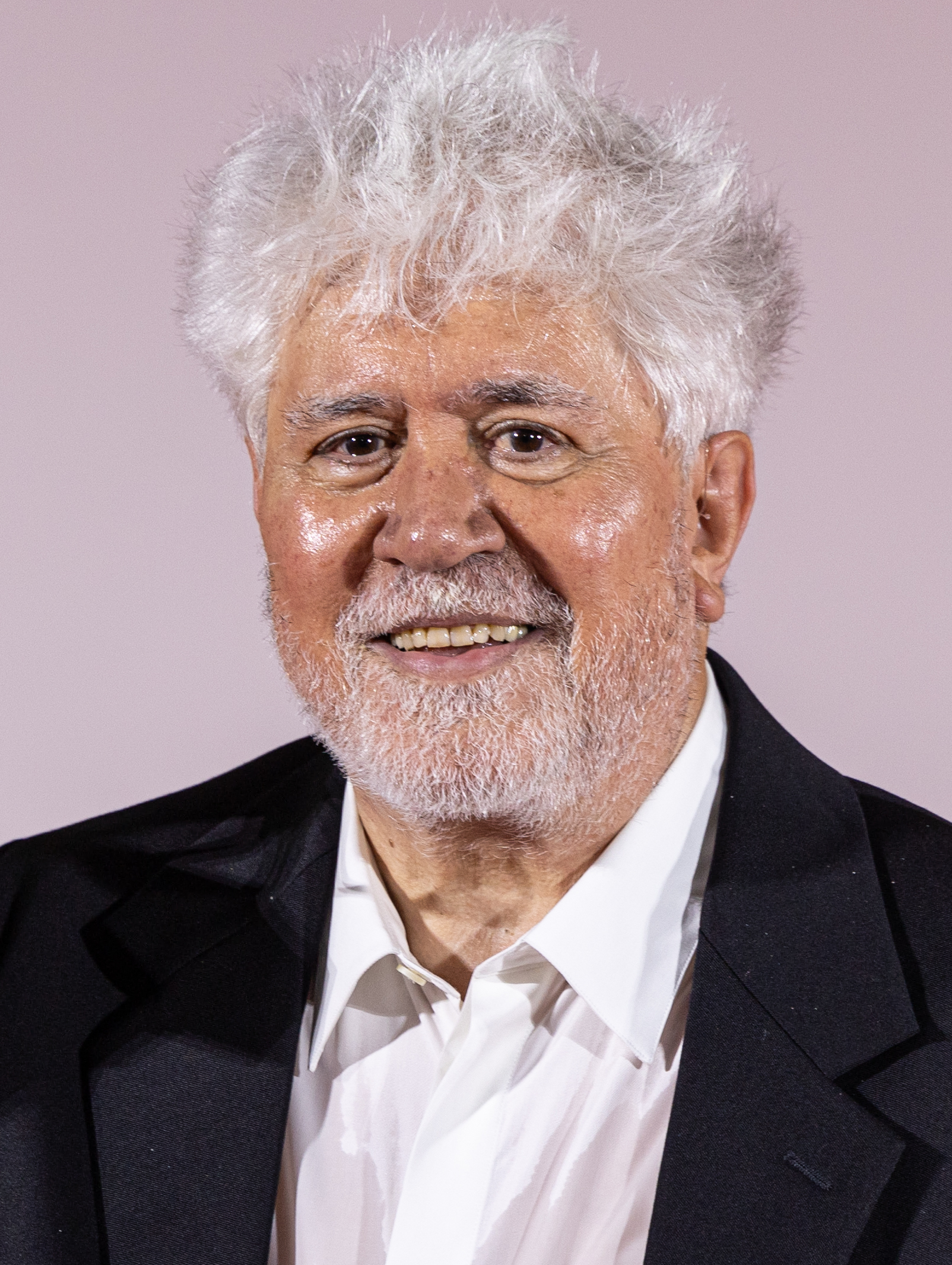
- Almodóvar in 2024
- Born: Pedro Almodóvar Caballero; 25 September 1949 (age 77); Calzada de Calatrava, Spain
- Occupations: Film director; screenwriter; author
- Years active: 1974–present
- Partner: Fernando Iglesias (2002–present)
- Relatives: Agustín Almodóvar (brother)
- Awards: Full list

Pedro Almodóvar Caballero (Spanish: [ˈpeðɾo almoˈðoβaɾ kaβaˈʎeɾo]; born 25 September 1949) is a Spanish film director, screenwriter and author. His films are distinguished by melodrama, irreverent humour, bold colour, glossy décor, quotations from popular culture, and complex narratives. Desire, LGBTQ issues, passion, family, motherhood, and identity are among Almodóvar's most frequently explored subjects. As one of the most internationally successful Spanish filmmakers, Almodóvar and his films have developed a cult following.

Almodóvar's early career developed during La Movida Madrileña, a cultural movement in post-Francoist Spain. His early films characterised the sense of sexual and political freedom of the period. In 1986, he established his own film production company, El Deseo, with his younger brother Agustín Almodóvar, who has been responsible for producing all of his films since Law of Desire (1987). His breakthrough film was Women on the Verge of a Nervous Breakdown (1988), which was nominated for the Academy Award for Best Foreign Language Film.

He achieved further success often collaborating with actors Antonio Banderas and Penélope Cruz. He directed Tie Me Up! Tie Me Down! (1989), High Heels (1991), and Live Flesh (1997). Almodóvar's next two films, All About My Mother (1999) and Talk to Her (2002), earned him an Academy Award each, for Best Foreign Language Film and Best Original Screenplay, respectively. His later films Volver (2006), Broken Embraces (2009), The Skin I Live In (2011), Julieta (2016), Pain and Glory (2019), and Parallel Mothers (2021) were also praised. He is also known for directing several short films including The Human Voice (2020) and Strange Way of Life (2023). He made his first English-language feature film with The Room Next Door (2024), which won the Golden Lion at the 81st Venice International Film Festival.

Almodóvar has received numerous accolades, including an Academy Award, two Golden Globe Awards, two Emmy Awards, five BAFTA Awards, and five Goya Awards. He received the French Legion of Honour in 1997, the Gold Medal of Merit in the Fine Arts in 1999, the European Film Academy Achievement in World Cinema Award in 2013, and the Golden Lion for Lifetime Achievement in 2019. He has also received honorary doctoral degrees from Harvard University, in 2009 and from the University of Oxford in 2016.

== Early life ==
Pedro Almodóvar Caballero was born on 25 September 1949 in Calzada de Calatrava, a small rural town of the Province of Ciudad Real in Spain. He has two older sisters, Antonia and María Jesús, and one brother Agustín. His father, Antonio Almodóvar (d. 1980), was a winemaker, and his mother, Francisca Caballero (1916–1999), was a letter reader and transcriber for illiterate neighbours.

When Almodóvar was eight years old, the family sent him to study at a religious boarding school in the city of Cáceres, Extremadura, in western Spain, with the hope that he might someday become a priest. His family eventually joined him in Cáceres, where his father opened a gas station and his mother opened a bodega in which she sold her own wine. Unlike Calzada, there was a cinema in Cáceres. "Cinema became my real education, much more than the one I received from the priest", he said later in an interview. Almodóvar was influenced by Luis Buñuel.

Against his parents' wishes, Almodóvar moved to Madrid in 1967 to become a filmmaker. When the Spanish dictator, Francisco Franco, closed the National School of Cinema in Madrid, Almodóvar became self-taught. To support himself, Almodóvar had a number of jobs, including selling used items in the famous Madrid flea market El Rastro and as an administrative assistant with the Spanish phone company Telefónica, where he worked for 12 years.

== Career ==
=== 1974–1979: Early work and short films ===
In the early 1970s, Almodóvar became interested in experimental cinema and theatre. He collaborated with the vanguard theatrical group Los Goliardos, in which he played his first professional roles and met actress Carmen Maura. Madrid's flourishing alternative cultural scene became the perfect scenario for Almodóvar's social talents. He was a crucial figure in La Movida Madrileña (the Madrilenian Movement), a cultural renaissance that followed the death of Francisco Franco in 1975. Alongside Fabio McNamara, Almodóvar sang in a glam rock parody duo.

Almodóvar also wrote various articles for major newspapers and magazines, such as El País, Diario 16 and La Luna, as well as contributing to comic strips, articles and stories in counterculture magazines, such as Star, El Víbora and Vibraciones. He published a novella, Fuego en las entrañas (Fire in the Guts), and kept writing stories that were eventually published in a compilation volume entitled El sueño de la razón (The Dream of Reason).

Almodóvar bought his first camera, a Super-8, with his first paycheck from Telefónica when he was 22 years old and began to make hand-held short films.

Around 1974, he made his first short film, and by the end of the 1970s they were shown in Madrid's night circuit and in Barcelona. These shorts had overtly sexual narratives and no soundtrack: Dos putas, o, Historia de amor que termina en boda (Two Whores, or, A Love Story that Ends in Marriage) in 1974; La caída de Sodoma (The Fall of Sodom) in 1975; Homenaje (Homage) in 1976; La estrella (The Star) in 1977; Sexo Va: Sexo viene (Sex Comes and Goes); and Complementos (Shorts) in 1978, his first film in 16mm.

He remembers, "I showed them in bars, at parties... I could not add a soundtrack because it was very difficult. The magnetic strip was very poor, very thin. I remember that I became very famous in Madrid because, as the films had no sound, I took a cassette with music while I personally did the voices of all the characters, songs and dialogues". After four years of working with shorts in Super-8 format, Almodóvar made his first full-length film Folle, folle, fólleme, Tim (Fuck Me, Fuck Me, Fuck Me, Tim) in Super-8 in 1978, followed by his first 16 mm short Salomé.

=== 1980–1987: Rise to prominence ===
Pepi, Luci, Bom and Other Girls on the Heap (1980)

Pepi, Luci, Bom and Other Girls on the Heap is a 1980 Spanish comedy film and Almodóvar's debut feature. The story follows the chaotic adventures of three unique women living in post-Franco Madrid. The film is a major symbol of the Movida Madrileña, a countercultural movement celebrating newfound personal freedom. Due to its raw underground style, this low-budget project became a cult classic and launched Almodóvar's career.

Labyrinth of Passion (1982)

His second feature Labyrinth of Passion (1982) focuses on nymphomaniac pop star, Sexila (Cecilia Roth), who falls in love with a gay middle-eastern prince, Riza Niro (Imanol Arias). Their unlikely destiny is to find one another, overcome their sexual preferences, and live happily ever after on a tropical island. Framed in Madrid during La Movida Madrileña, between the dissolution of Franco's authoritarian regime and the onset of AIDS consciousness, Labyrinth of Passion caught the spirit of liberation in Madrid and it became a cult film.

The film marked Almodóvar's first collaboration with cinematographer Ángel Luis Fernandez as well as the first of several collaborations with actor Antonio Banderas. Labyrinth of Passion premiered at the 1982 San Sebastian Film Festival. While the film received better reviews than its predecessor, Almodóvar later acknowledged: "I like the film even if it could have been better made. The main problem is that the story of the two leads is much less interesting than the stories of all the secondary characters. But precisely because there are so many secondary characters, there's a lot in the film I like".

Dark Habits (1983)

For his next film Dark Habits (1983), Almodóvar was approached by multi-millionaire Hervé Hachuel, who wanted to start a production company to make films starring his girlfriend, Cristina Sánchez Pascual. Hachuel set up Tesuaro Production and asked Almodóvar to keep Pascual in mind. Almodóvar had already written the script for Dark Habits and made changes to the script so his supporting cast were more prominent in the story.

The film heralded a change in tone to somber melodrama with comic elements. Pascual stars as Yolanda, a cabaret singer who seeks refuge in a convent of eccentric nuns, each of whom explores a different sin. This film has an almost all-female cast including Carmen Maura, Julieta Serrano, Marisa Paredes and Chus Lampreave, actresses who Almodóvar would cast again in later films. This is Almodóvar's first film in which he used popular music to express emotion: in a pivotal scene, the mother superior and her protégé sing along with Lucho Gatica's bolero "Encadenados".

Dark Habits premiered at the Venice Film Festival and was surrounded in controversy due its subject matter. Despite religious critics being offended by the film, it went on to become a modest critical and commercial success, establishing Almodóvar's reputation as the enfant terrible of Spanish cinema.

What Have I Done to Deserve This? (1984)

Carmen Maura stars in What Have I Done to Deserve This?, Almodóvar's fourth film, as Gloria, an unhappy housewife who lives with her ungrateful husband Antonio (Ángel de Andrés López), her mother-in-law (Chus Lampreave), and her two teenage sons. Verónica Forqué appears as her prostitute neighbor and confidante.

Almodóvar has described his fourth film as an homage to Italian neorealism, although this tribute also involves jokes about paedophilia, prostitution, and a telekinetic child. The film, set in the tower blocks around Madrid in post-Franco Spain, depicts female frustration and family breakdown, echoing Jean-Luc Godard's Two or Three Things I Know About Her and strong story plots from Roald Dahl's Lamb to the Slaughter and Truman Capote's A Day's Work, but with Almodóvar's unique approach to film making.

Matador (1986)

Almodóvar's growing success caught the attention of emerging Spanish film producer Andrés Vicente Gómez, who wanted to join forces to make his next film Matador (1986). The film centres on the relationship between a former bullfighter and a murderous female lawyer, who both find sexual fulfillment through acts of murder.

Written together with Spanish novelist Jesús Ferrero, Matador moved away from the naturalism and humour of the director's previous work into a deeper and darker terrain. Almodóvar cast several of his regulars actors in key roles: Antonio Banderas was hired for the role of Ángel, a bullfighting student who, after an attempted rape incident, falsely confesses to a series of murders that he did not commit; Julieta Serrano appears as Ángel's very religious mother; while Carmen Maura, Chus Lampreave, Verónica Forqué and Eusebio Poncela also appear in minor roles. Newcomers Nacho Martínez and Assumpta Serna, had major roles, with Martinez as the retired bullfighter who teaches Ángel and with Serna as Ángel's attorney. Matador also marked the first time Almodóvar included a notable cinematic reference, using King Vidor's 1946 Duel in the Sun in one scene.

The film premiered in 1986 and drew some controversy due to its subject matter.

Almodóvar justified his use of violence, explaining: "The moral of all my films is to get to a stage of greater freedom." He went on to note: "I have my own morality. And so do my films. If you see Matador through the perspective of traditional morality, it's a dangerous film because it's just a celebration of killing. Matador is like a legend. I don't try to be realistic; it's very abstract, so you don't feel identification with the things that are happening, but with the sensibility of this kind of romanticism."

The Law of Desire (1987)

Following the success of Matador, Almodóvar solidified his creative independence by starting his own production company, El Deseo, together with his brother Agustín Almodóvar in 1986. El Deseo's first major release was Law of Desire (1987), a film about the complicated love triangle between a gay filmmaker (Eusebio Poncela), his transsexual sister (Carmen Maura), and a repressed murderously obsessive stalker (Antonio Banderas).

Taking more risk from a visual standpoint, Almodóvar's growth as a filmmaker is clearly on display. In presenting the love triangle, Almodóvar drew away from most representations of homosexuals in films. The characters neither come out nor confront sexual guilt or homophobia; they are already liberated. The same can be said for the complex way he depicted transgender characters on screen. Almodóvar said about The Law of Desire: "It's the key film in my life and career. It deals with my vision of desire, something that's both very hard and very human. By this I mean the absolute necessity of being desired and the fact that in the interplay of desires it's rare that two desires meet and correspond."

The Law of Desire made its premiere at the Berlin International Film Festival in 1987, where it won the festival's first ever Teddy Award, which recognises achievement in LGBT cinema. The film was a hit in art-house theatres and received much praise from critics.

=== 1988–2002: Stardom and critical acclaim ===
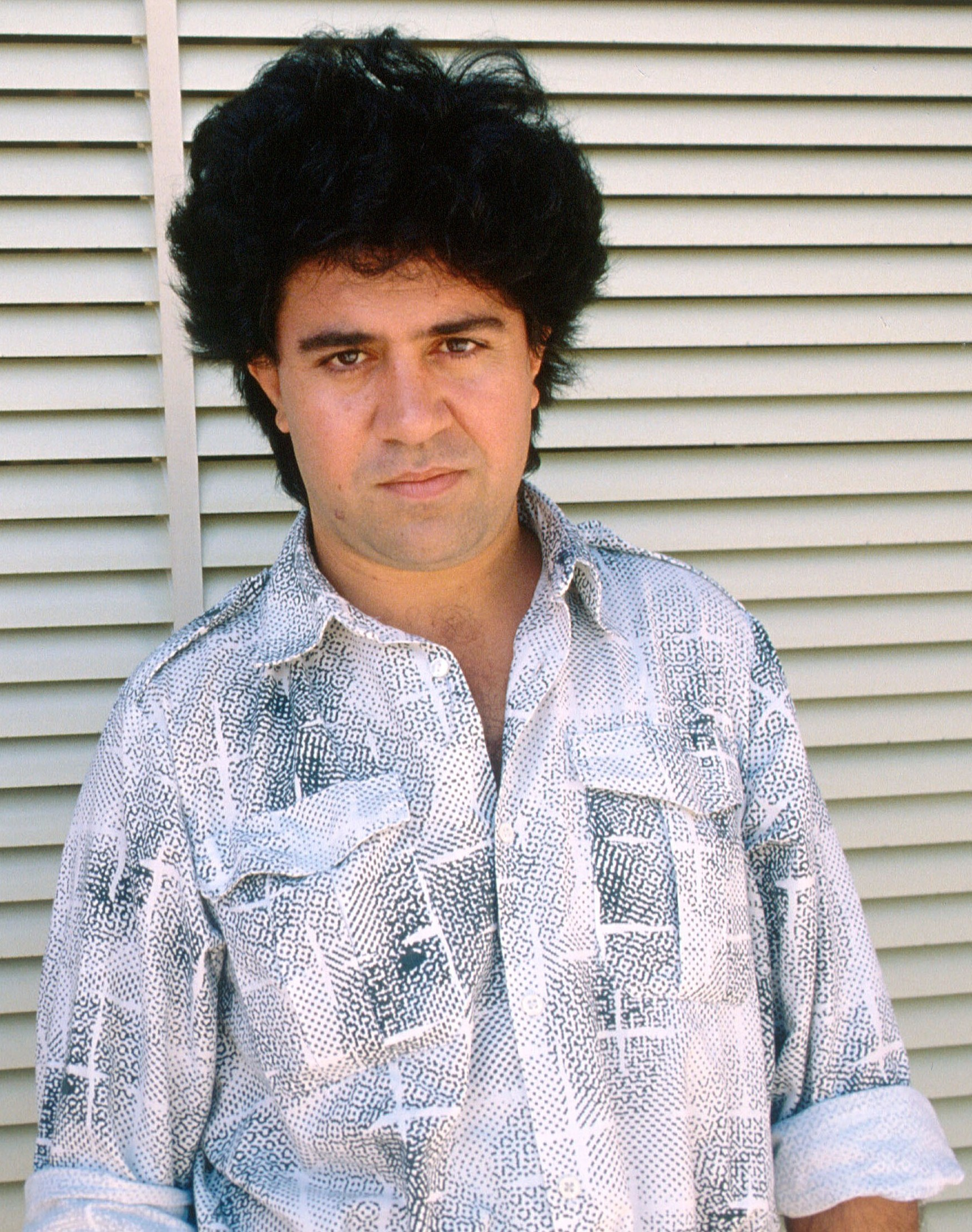
Almodóvar in 1988

Women on the Verge of a Nervous Breakdown (1988)

Almodóvar's first major critical and commercial success internationally came with the release of Women on the Verge of a Nervous Breakdown (1988).The film debuted at the 45th Venice film festival. This feminist light comedy of rapid-fire dialogue and fast-paced action further established Almodóvar as a "women's director", in the same vein as George Cukor and Rainer Werner Fassbinder. Almodóvar has said that women make better characters: "women are more spectacular as dramatic subjects, they have a greater range of registers, etc."

Women on the Verge of a Nervous Breakdown centres on Pepa (Carmen Maura), a woman who has been abruptly abandoned by her married boyfriend Iván (Fernando Guillén). Over two days, Pepa frantically tries to track him down. In the course, she discovers some of his secrets and realises her true feelings. Almodóvar included many of his usual actors, including Antonio Banderas, Chus Lampreave, Rossy de Palma, Kiti Mánver and Julieta Serrano, as well as newcomer María Barranco.

The film was released in Spain in March 1988 and became a hit in the US, making more than $7 million when it was released later that same year, bringing Almodóvar to the attention of American audiences. Women on the Verge of a Nervous Breakdown won five Goya Awards, Spain's top film honours, for Best Film, Best Original Screenplay, Best Editing (José Salcedo), Best Actress (Maura), and Best Supporting Actress (Barranco). The film won an award for best screenplay at the Venice film festival and two awards at the European Film Awards as well as being nominated for Best Foreign Language Film at the BAFTAs and Golden Globes. It also gave Almodóvar his first Academy Award nomination for Best Foreign Language Film.

Tie Me Up! Tie Me Down! (1990)

Almodóvar's next film marked the end of the collaboration between him and Carmen Maura, and the beginning of a fruitful collaboration with Victoria Abril. Tie Me Up! Tie Me Down! (1990) tells the story about a recently released psychiatric patient, Ricky (Antonio Banderas), who kidnaps a porn star, Marina (Abril), in order to make her fall in love with him.

Rather than populate the film with many characters, as in his previous films, here the story focuses on the compelling relationship at its center: the actress and her kidnapper literally struggling for power and desperate for love. The film's title line Tie Me Up! is unexpectedly uttered by the actress as a genuine request. She does not know if she will try to escape or not, and when she realizes she has feelings for her captor, she prefers not to be given a chance. In spite of some dark elements, Tie Me Up! Tie Me Down! can be described as a romantic comedy and the director's most clear love story. Its plot is similar to William Wyler's thriller The Collector.

Tie Me Up! Tie Me Down! made its world premiere at the Berlin Film Festival, where critical reaction was polarized. In the United States, the film received an X rating by the Motion Picture Association of America (MPAA), and the stigma attached to the X rating marginalized the distribution of the film in the country. Miramax, who distributed the film in the US, filed a lawsuit against the MPAA over the X rating, but lost in court.

However, in September 1990, the MPAA replaced the X rating with the NC-17 rating. This was helpful to films of explicit nature, such as Tie Me Up! Tie Me Down!, that were previously categorized with pornography because of the X rating.

High Heels (1991)

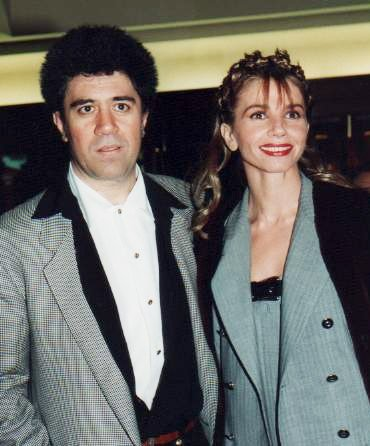
Almodóvar with Victoria Abril, star of High Heels, at the 1993 César Awards in Paris

High Heels (1991) is built around the fractured relationship between a famous singer, Becky del Páramo (Marisa Paredes), and her news reporter daughter, Rebeca (Victoria Abril), as the pair get caught up in a murder mystery. Rebeca struggles with constantly being in her mother's shadow. The fact that Rebeca is married to Becky's former lover only adds to the tension between the two.

The film was partly inspired by old Hollywood mother-daughter melodramas like Stella Dallas, Mildred Pierce, Imitation of Life and particularly Autumn Sonata, which is quoted directly in the film. Production took place in 1990; Almodóvar enlisted Alfredo Mayo to shoot the film as Jose Luis Alcaine was unavailable. Japanese composer Ryuichi Sakamoto created a score that infused popular songs and boleros. High Heels also contains a prison yard dance sequence.

While High Heels was a box office success in Spain, the film received poor reviews from Spanish film critics due to its melodramatic approach and surprising tonal shifts. The film got a better critical reception in Italy and France and won France's César Award for Best Foreign Film. In the US, Miramax's lack of promotional effort was blamed for the film's underperformance in the country. It was however nominated for the Golden Globe for Best Foreign Language Film.

Kika (1993)

His next film Kika (1993) centres on the good-hearted, but clueless, makeup artist named Kika (Verónica Forqué) who gets herself tangled in the lives of an American writer (Peter Coyote) and his stepson (Àlex Casanovas). A fashion conscious TV reporter (Victoria Abril), who is constantly in search of sensational stories, follows Kika's misadventures. Almodóvar used Kika as a critique of mass media, particularly its sensationalism.

The film is infamous for its rape scene, which Almodóvar used for comic effect to set up a scathing commentary on the selfish and ruthless nature of media. Kika made its premiere in 1993 and received very negative reviews from film critics worldwide; not just for its rape scene, which was perceived as both misogynistic and exploitative, but also for its overall sloppiness. Almodóvar would later refer to the film as one of his weakest works.

The Flower of My Secret (1995)

In The Flower of My Secret (1995), the story focuses on Leo Macías (Marisa Paredes), a successful romance writer who has to confront both a professional and personal crisis. Estranged from her husband, a military officer who has volunteered for an international peacekeeping role in Bosnia and Herzegovina to avoid her, Leo fights to hold on to a past that has already eluded her, not realising she has already set her future path by her own creativity and by supporting the creative efforts of others.

This was the first time that Almodóvar used composer Alberto Iglesias and cinematographer Affonso Beato, who became key figures in some future films. The Flower of My Secret is the transitional film between his earlier and later style.

The film premiered in Spain in 1995 where, despite receiving 7 Goya Award nominations, it was not initially well received by critics.

Live Flesh (1997)

Live Flesh (1997) was the first film by Almodóvar that had an adapted screenplay. Based on Ruth Rendell's mystery novel Live Flesh, the film follows a man who is sent to prison after crippling a police officer and seeks redemption years later when he is released. Almodóvar decided to move the book's original location of the UK to Spain, and set the action between 1970, when Franco declared a state of emergency, to 1996, when Spain had completely shaken off the restrictions of the Franco regime.

Live Flesh marked Almodóvar's first collaboration with Penélope Cruz, who plays the prostitute who gives birth to Victor. Additionally, Almodóvar cast Javier Bardem as the police officer David and Liberto Rabal as Víctor, the criminal seeking redemption. Italian actress Francesca Neri plays a former drug addict who sparks a complicated love triangle with David and Víctor.

Live Flesh premiered at the New York Film Festival in 1997. The film did modestly well at the international box office and also earned Almodóvar his second BAFTA nomination for Best Film Not in the English Language.

All About My Mother (1999)

Almodóvar's next film, All About My Mother (1999), grew out of a brief scene in The Flower of My Secret. The premise revolves around a woman Manuela (Cecilia Roth), who loses her teenage son, Esteban (Eloy Azorín) in a tragic accident. Filled with grief, Manuela decides to track down Esteban's transgender mother, Lola (Toni Cantó), and notify her about the death of the son she never knew she had. Along the way Manuela encounters an old friend, Agrado (Antonia San Juan), and meets up with a pregnant nun, Rosa (Penélope Cruz).

The film revisited Almodóvar's familiar themes of the power of sisterhood and of family. Almodóvar shot parts of the film in Barcelona and used lush colors to emphasise the richness of the city. Dedicated to Bette Davis, Romy Schneider and Gena Rowlands, All About My Mother is steeped in theatricality, from its backstage setting to its plot, modeled on the works of Federico García Lorca and Tennessee Williams, to the characters' preoccupation with modes of performance. Almodóvar inserts a number of references to American cinema. One of the film's key scenes, where Manuela watches her son die, was inspired by John Cassavetes' 1977 film Opening Night. The film's title is also a nod to All About Eve, which Manuela and her son are shown watching in the film. The comic relief of the film centers on Agrado, a pre-operative transgender woman. In one scene, she tells the story of her body and its relationship to plastic surgery and silicone, culminating with a statement of her own philosophy: "you get to be more authentic the more you become like what you have dreamed of yourself".

All About My Mother opened at the 1999 Cannes Film Festival, where Almodóvar won both the Best Director and the Ecumenical Jury prizes. The film garnered a strong critical reception and grossed more than $67 million worldwide. All About My Mother has received more awards and honours than any other film in the Spanish motion picture industry, including the Academy Award for Best Foreign Language Film, the Golden Globe in the same category, the BAFTA Awards for Best Direction and Best Film Not in the English Language, as well as 6 Goyas in Almodovar's native Spain.

Talk to Her (2002)

After the success of All About My Mother, Almodóvar took a break from filmmaking to focus on his production company El Deseo. During this break, Almodóvar had an idea for Talk to Her (2002), a film about two men, played by Javier Cámara and Darío Grandinetti, who become friends while taking care of the comatose women they love, played by Leonor Watling and Rosario Flores. Combining elements of modern dance and silent filmmaking with a narrative that embraces coincidence and fate, Almodóvar plots the lives of his characters, thrown together by unimaginably bad luck, towards an unexpected conclusion.

Talk to Her was released in April 2002 in Spain, followed by its international premiere at the Telluride Film Festival in September of that year. It was hailed by critics and embraced by arthouse audiences, particularly in America. The unanimous praise for Talk to Her resulted in Almodóvar winning his first Academy Award, this time for Best Original Screenplay, as well as being nominated in the Best Director category. The film also won the César Award for Best Film from the European Union and both the BAFTA Award and Golden Globe Award for Best Foreign Language Film. Talk to Her made more than $51 million worldwide.

=== 2004–2016: Established director ===
Bad Education (2004)

Two years later, Almodóvar followed with Bad Education (2004), tale of child sexual abuse and mixed identities, starring Gael García Bernal and Fele Martínez. In the drama film, two children, Ignácio and Enrique, discover love, cinema, and fear in a religious school at the start of the 1960s. Bad Education has a complex structure that not only uses film within a film, but also stories that open up into other stories, real and imagined, to narrate the same story: A tale of child molestation and its aftermath of faithlessness, creativity, despair, blackmail and murder. Sexual abuse by Catholic priests, transsexuality, drug use, and a metafiction are also important themes and devices in the plot.

Almodóvar used elements of film noir, borrowing in particular from Double Indemnity. The film's protagonist, Juan (Gael Garcia Bernal), was modeled largely on Patricia Highsmith's most famous character, Tom Ripley, as played by Alain Delon in René Clément's Purple Noon. A criminal without scruples, but with an adorable face that betrays nothing of his true nature. Almodóvar explains : "He also represents a classic film noir character – the femme fatale. Which means that when other characters come into contact with him, he embodies fate, in the most tragic and noir sense of the word". Almodóvar claimed he worked on the film's screenplay for more than ten years before starting the film.

Bad Education premiered in March 2004 in Spain before opening in the 57th Cannes Film Festival, the first Spanish film to do so, two months later. The film grossed more than $40 million worldwide, despite its NC-17 rating in the US. It won the GLAAD Media Award for Outstanding Film – Limited Release and was nominated for the BAFTA Award for Best Film Not in the English Language; it also received 7 European Film Award nominations and 4 Goya nominations.

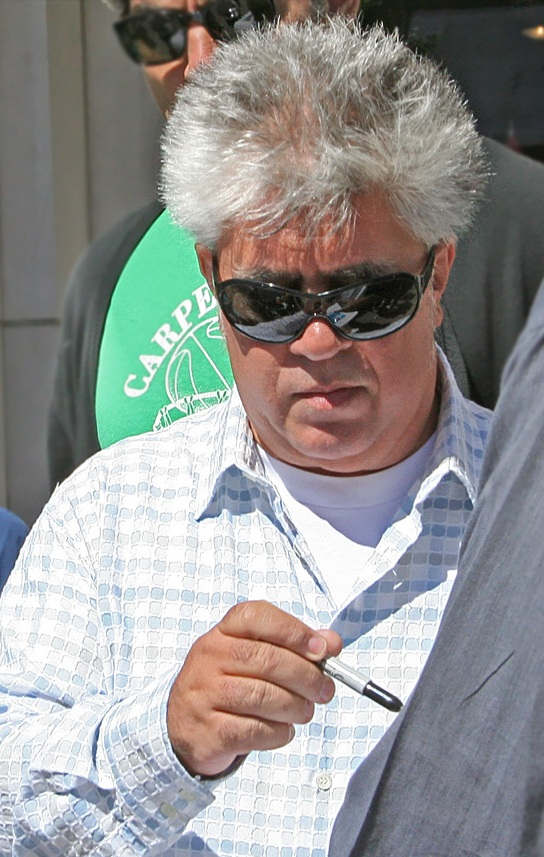
Almodóvar at the 2006 Toronto International Film Festival

Volver (2006)

Volver (2006), a mixture of comedy, family drama and ghost story, is set in part in La Mancha (the director's native region). It follows the story of three generations of women in the same family who survive wind, fire, and even death. The film is an ode to female resilience, where men are literally disposable. Volver stars Penélope Cruz, Lola Dueñas, Blanca Portillo, Yohana Cobo and Chus Lampreave, in addition to reuniting the director with Carmen Maura, who had appeared in several of his early films.

The film was very personal to Almodóvar as he drew from his own childhood to shape parts of the story. Many of the characters in the film were variations of people he knew from his small town. Using a colorful backdrop, the film tackled many complex themes such as sexual abuse, grief, secrets and death. The storyline of Volver appears as both a novel and movie script in Almodóvar's earlier film The Flower of My Secret. Many of Almodóvar's stylistic hallmarks are present: the stand-alone song (a rendition of the Argentinian tango song "Volver"), references to reality TV, and an homage to classic film (in this case Luchino Visconti's Bellissima).

Volver received a rapturous reception when it played at the 2006 Cannes Film Festival, where Almodóvar won the Best Screenplay prize while the entire female ensemble won the Best Actress prize. Penélope Cruz also received an Academy Award nomination for Best Actress, making her the first Spanish woman ever to be nominated in that category. Volver went on to earn several critical accolades and earned more than £85 million internationally, becoming Almodóvar's highest-grossing film worldwide.

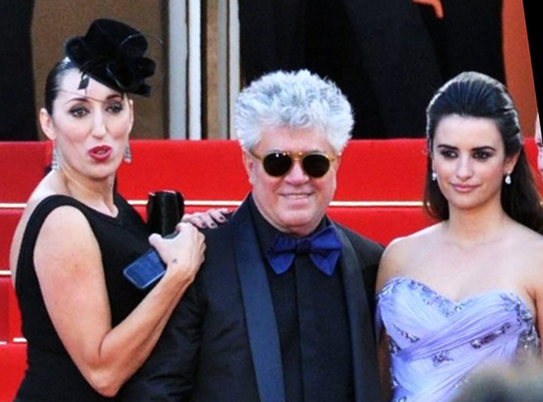
Almodóvar with Rossy de Palma (left) and Penélope Cruz at the premiere of Broken Embraces at the 2009 Cannes Film Festival

Broken Embraces (2009)

Almodóvar's next film, Broken Embraces (2009) a romantic thriller which centres on a blind novelist, Harry Caine (Lluís Homar), who uses his works to recount both his former life as a filmmaker and the tragedy that took his sight. A key figure in Caine's past is Lena (Penélope Cruz), an aspiring actress who gets embroiled in a love triangle with Caine and a paranoid millionaire, Ernesto (José Luis Gómez). The film has a complex structure, mixing past and present and film within a film. Almodóvar previously used this type of structure in Talk to Her and Bad Education.

Jose Luis Alcaine was unable to take part in the production, so Almodóvar hired Mexican cinematographer Rodrigo Prieto to shoot the film. Distinctive shading and shadows help to differentiate the various time periods within Broken Embraces, as Almodóvar's narrative jumps between the early 1990s and the late 2000s. Broken Embraces was accepted into the main selection at the 2009 Cannes Film Festival in competition for the Palme d'Or, his third film to do so and fourth to screen at the festival. The film earned £30 million worldwide, and received critical acclaim among critics.

Roger Ebert gave the film his highest rating, 4 stars, writing, "Broken Embraces" is a voluptuary of a film, drunk on primary colors...using the devices of a Hitchcock to distract us with surfaces while the sinister uncoils beneath. As it ravished me, I longed for a freeze frame to allow me to savor a shot."

Despite not receiving an Academy Award nomination, the film was nominated for both the British Academy Film Award and the Golden Globe Award for Best Foreign Language Film.

The Skin I Live In (2011)

Loosely based on the French novel Tarantula by Thierry Jonquet, The Skin I Live In (2011) is the director's first incursion into the psychological horror genre. Inspired to make his own horror film, The Skin I Live In revolves around a plastic surgeon, Robert (Antonio Banderas), who becomes obsessed with creating skin that can withstand burns. Haunted by past tragedies, Robert believes that the key to his research is the patient who he mysteriously keeps prisoner in his mansion. The film marked a long-awaited reunion between Almodóvar and Antonio Banderas, reunited after 21 years. Penélope Cruz was initially slated for the role of the captive patient Vera Cruz, but she was unable to take part as she was pregnant with her first child. As a result, Elena Anaya, who had appeared in Talk to Her, was cast.

The Skin I Live In has many cinematic influences, most notably the French horror film Eyes Without a Face directed by Georges Franju, but also refers to Alfred Hitchcock's Vertigo and the style of films of David Cronenberg, Dario Argento, Mario Bava, Umberto Lenzi and Lucio Fulci, while also paying tribute to the films of Fritz Lang and F. W. Murnau. After making its premiere at the 2011 Cannes Film Festival, the film grossed $30 million worldwide. The Skin I Live In received the BAFTA Award for Best Film Not in the English Language and a Golden Globe Award nomination in the same category.

I'm So Excited (2013)

After a long period of dramatic and serious feature films, Almodóvar's next film was a comedy. I'm So Excited (2013) is set almost entirely on an aircraft in flight, whose first-class passengers, pilots, and trio of gay stewards all try to deal with the fact that landing gears are malfunctioning. During the ordeal, they talk about love, themselves, and a plethora of topics while getting drunk on Valencia cocktails. With its English title taken from a song by the Pointer Sisters, Almodóvar openly embraced the campy humor that was prominent in his early works.

The film's cast was a mixture of Almodóvar regulars such as Cecilia Roth, Javier Cámara, and Lola Dueñas, Blanca Suárez and Paz Vega, and stars Antonio Banderas and Penélope Cruz, who make cameo appearances in the film's opening scene. Shot on a soundstage, Almodóvar amplified the campy tone by incorporating a dance number and oddball characters such as Dueñas' virginal psychic. The film premiered in Spain in March 2013 and had its international release during the summer of that year. Despite mixed reviews from critics, the film did fairly well at the international box office.

Julieta (2016)

For his 20th feature film, Almodóvar decided to return to drama and his "cinema of women". Julieta (2016) stars Emma Suárez and Adriana Ugarte, who play the older and younger versions of the film's titular character, as well as regular Rossy de Palma, who has a supporting role in the film. This film was originally titled Silencio (Silence) but the director changed the name to prevent confusion with another recent release by that name.

The film was released in April 2016 in Spain to positive reviews and received its international debut at the 2016 Cannes Film Festival. It was Almodóvar's fifth film to compete for the Palme d'Or. The film was also selected by the Spanish Academy as the entry for the Best Foreign Language Film at the 89th Academy Awards, but it did not make the shortlist.

=== 2019–present ===
Pain and Glory (2019)

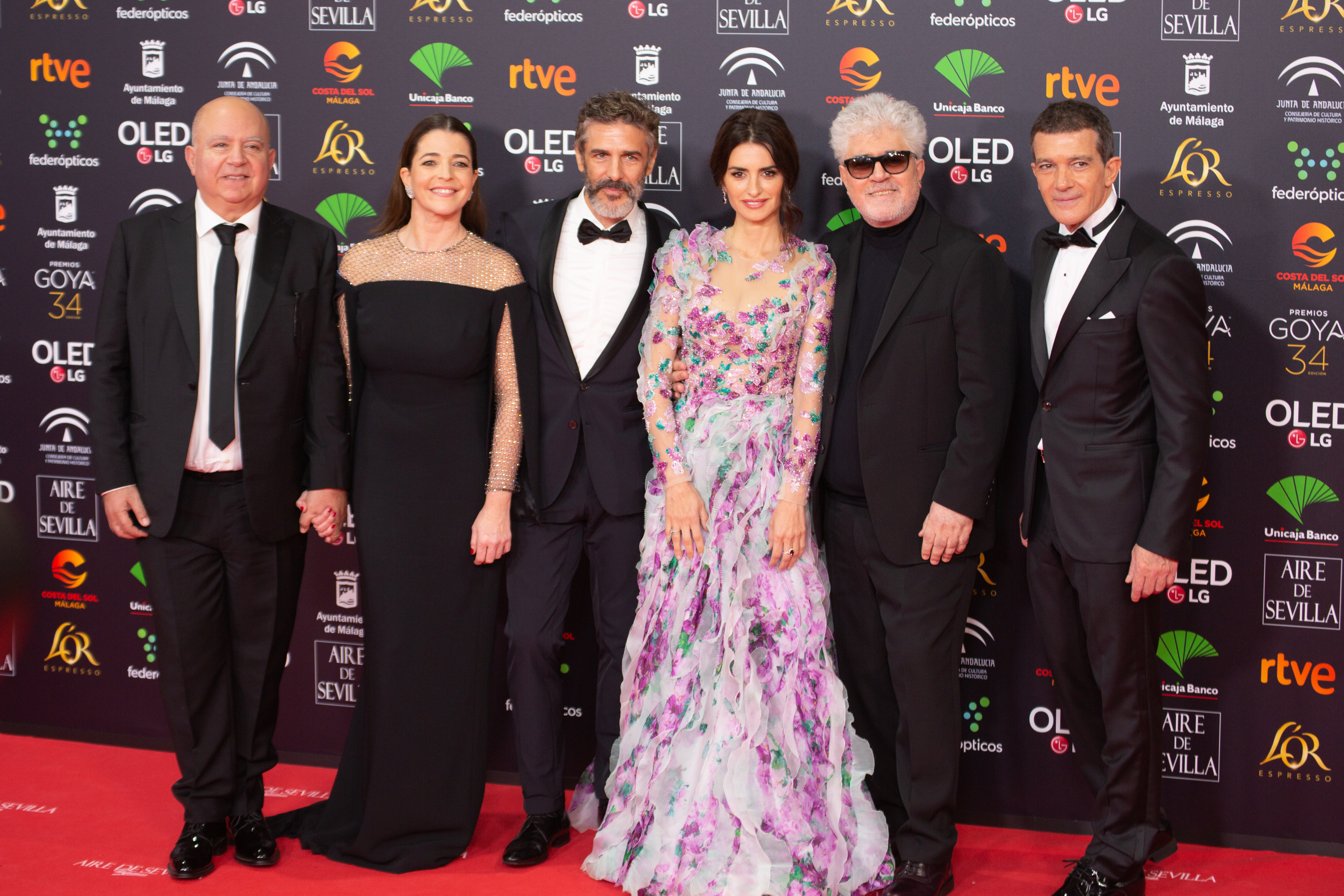
Almodóvar with his brother Agustín, Nora Navas, Leonardo Sbaraglia, Penélope Cruz, and Antonio Banderas at the red carpet of the 34th Goya Awards in 2020

Almodóvar's next film—Pain and Glory (Dolor y gloria)—was released in Spain on 22 March 2019 by Sony Pictures Releasing. It first was selected to compete for the Palme d'Or at the 2019 Cannes Film Festival. The film centers around an aging film director, played by Antonio Banderas, who is suffering from chronic illness and writer's block as he reflects on his life in flashbacks to his childhood. Penelope Cruz plays Jacinta, his mother, in the film's flashbacks. Almodóvar has described the film as semi-autobiographical. The film was nominated for the Academy Award for Best International Feature Film, though it ultimately lost to Bong Joon-ho's Parasite.

Parallel Mothers (2021)

In July 2020, Agustín Almodóvar announced that his brother had finished the script for his next full-length feature Parallel Mothers during the COVID-19 pandemic lockdown. Starring Penelope Cruz, the drama turns on two mothers who give birth the same day and follows their parallel lives over their first and second years raising their children. The film began shooting in February 2021 and opened the 78th Venice International Film Festival where Cruz won the Volpi Cup for Best Actress.

The film has received near universal acclaim with David Rooney of The Hollywood Reporter writing, "It's a testament to the consummate gifts of one of the world's most treasured filmmakers — now entering the fifth decade of a career still going strong — that he can constantly delight your eye with no risk of losing your involvement in the emotional lives of characters he so clearly adores." The film has been nominated for the Golden Globe Award and Independent Spirit Award for Best International Film.

The shoot delayed Almodóvar's previously announced feature-length adaptation of Lucia Berlin's short story collection A Manual for Cleaning Women starring Cate Blanchett, which had been set to be his first feature in English. During the COVID-19 pandemic Almodóvar directed the short film The Human Voice (2020) starring Tilda Swinton. The short, which was based on the Jean Cocteau play of the same name, premiered at the 77th Venice International Film Festival. He directed another short film Strange Way of Life (2023), a Western drama starring Ethan Hawke and Pedro Pascal. The film premiered at the 2023 Cannes Film Festival to positive reviews and was released in theatres by Sony Pictures Classics.

The Last Dream (2024)

In 2024, Almodóvar published his first collection of short stories. Described by Almodóvar as a "fragmentary autobiography", The Last Dream contains 12 stories that his assistant Lola García had archived – some of which are more than 50 years old and were written when Almodóvar was a teenager.

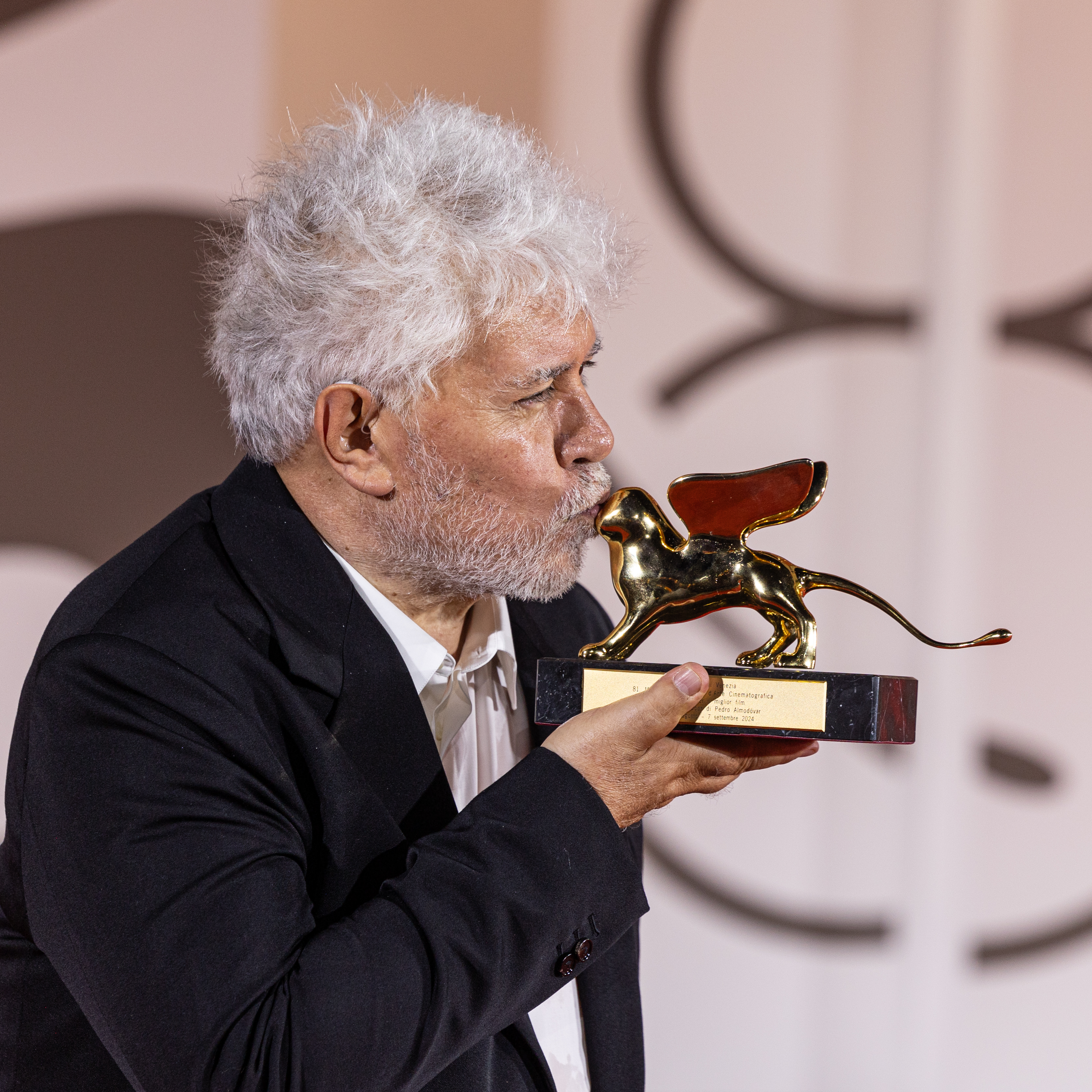
Almodóvar won the Golden Lion at the 81st Venice International Film Festival

The Room Next Door (2024)

Work on Almodóvar's film The Room Next Door began in March 2024. Featuring Tilda Swinton and Julianne Moore, it marked Almodóvar's feature length English-language debut. The film won the Golden Lion at the 2024 edition of the Venice Film Festival, becoming the first Spanish film to win the prize.

Bitter Christmas (2026)

Filming of Almodóvar's next film Bitter Christmas was expected start on the Canary Islands in June 2025. A "tragic comedy about gender", it will explore the story of a woman who is left by her lover at Christmas time. It premiered at the Cannes Film Festival in 2026.

Other

During a panel of the 64th New York Film Festival held in October 2026, Almodóvar stated his wish to adapt the Lesbian novel Peixos by Eva Baltasar to film, although he cast doubts about whether he would be able to find willing actresses.

== Artistry ==
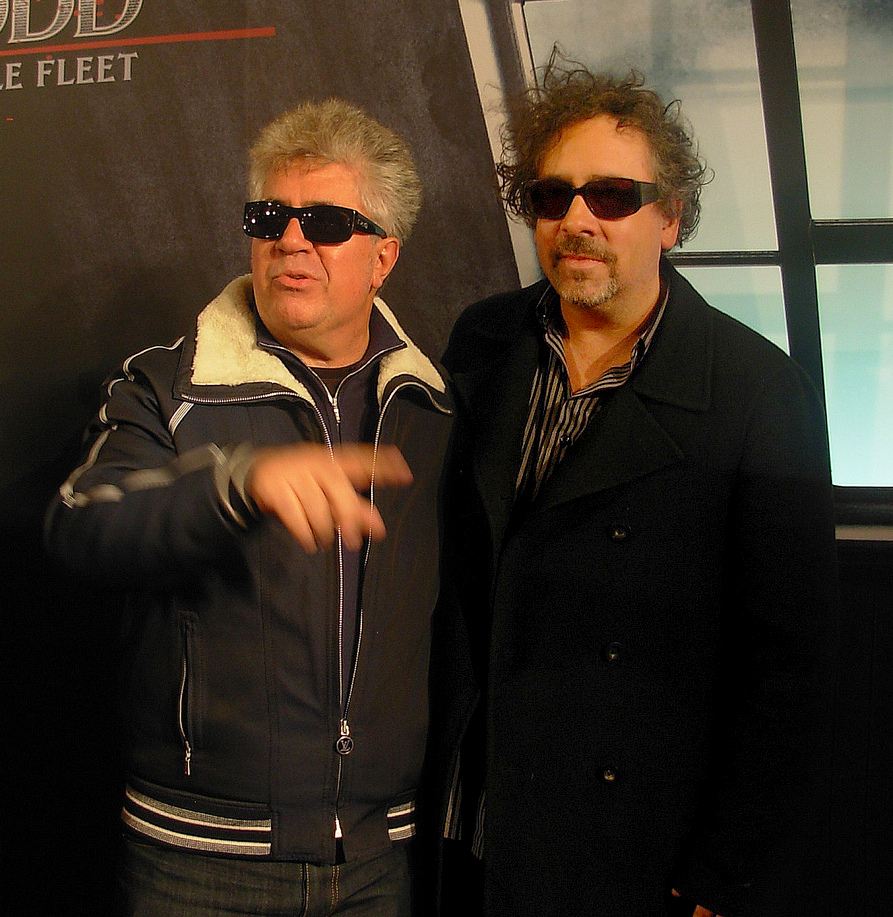
Almodóvar (left) and Tim Burton (right) at the première of Sweeney Todd: The Demon Barber of Fleet Street in Madrid, in 2007

"Almodóvar has consolidated his own, very recognizable universe, forged by repeating themes and stylistic features", wrote Gerard A. Cassadó in Fotogramas, Spanish film magazine, in which the writer identified nine key features which recur in Almodóvar's films: homosexuality; female heroines; sacrilegious Catholicism; lipsyncing; familial cameos; excessive kitsch and camp; narrative interludes; and intertextuality.

June Thomas from Slate magazine also recognised that illegal drug use, letter-writing, spying, stalking, prostitution, rape, incest, transsexuality, vomiting, movie-making, recent inmates, car accidents and women urinating on screen are frequent motifs recurring in his work.

Almodóvar has also been distinguished for his use of bold colours and inventive camera angles, as well as using "cinematic references, genre touchstones, and images that serve the same function as songs in a musical, to express what cannot be said". Elaborate décor and the relevance of fashion in his films are additionally important aspects informing the design of Almodóvar's mise-en-scène.

Music is also a key feature; from pop songs to boleros to original compositions by Alberto Iglesias. While some criticise Almodóvar for obsessively returning to the same themes and stylistic features, others have applauded him for having "the creativity to remake them afresh every time he comes back to them". Internationally, Almodóvar has been hailed as an auteur by film critics, who have coined the term "Almodovariano" (which would translate as Almodovarian) to define his unique style.

Almodóvar has taken influences from various filmmakers, including figures in North American cinema, particularly old Hollywood directors George Cukor and Billy Wilder, and the underground, transgressive cinema of John Waters and Andy Warhol. The influence of Douglas Sirk's melodramas and the stylistic appropriations of Alfred Hitchcock are also present in his work. He also takes inspiration from figures in the history of Spanish cinema, including directors Luis García Berlanga, Fernando Fernán Gómez, Edgar Neville as well as dramatists Miguel Mihura and Enrique Jardiel Poncela; many also hail Almodóvar as "the most celebrated Spanish filmmaker since Luis Buñuel". Other foreign influences include filmmakers Ingmar Bergman, Rainer Werner Fassbinder, Federico Fellini and Fritz Lang.

References to film and allusions to theatre, literature, dance, painting, television and advertising "are central to the world that Almodóvar constructs on screen". Film critic José Arroyo noted that Almodóvar "borrows indiscriminately from film history".

Almodóvar has acknowledged that "cinema is always present in my films [and that] certain films play an active part in my scripts. When I insert an extract from a film, it isn't a homage but outright theft. It's part of the story I'm telling, and becomes an active presence rather than a homage which is always something passive. I absorb the films I've seen into my own experience, which immediately becomes the experience of my characters".

Almodóvar has alluded to the work of many different artists and genres in his work; sometimes works have been referenced diegetically or evoked through less direct methods. Almodóvar has additionally made self-references to films within his own oeuvre.

Working with some of Spain's best-known actresses including Carmen Maura, Victoria Abril, Marisa Paredes and Penélope Cruz, Almodóvar has become famous for his female-centric films, his "sympathetic portrayals of women" and his elevation of "the humdrum spaces of overworked women". He was heavily influenced by classic Hollywood films in which everything happens around a female main character, and he aims to continue in that tradition. Almodóvar has frequently spoken about how he was surrounded by powerful women in his childhood: "Women were very happy, worked hard and always spoke. They handed me the first sensations and forged my character. The woman represented everything to me, the man was absent and represented authority. I never identified with the male figure: maternity inspires me more than paternity".

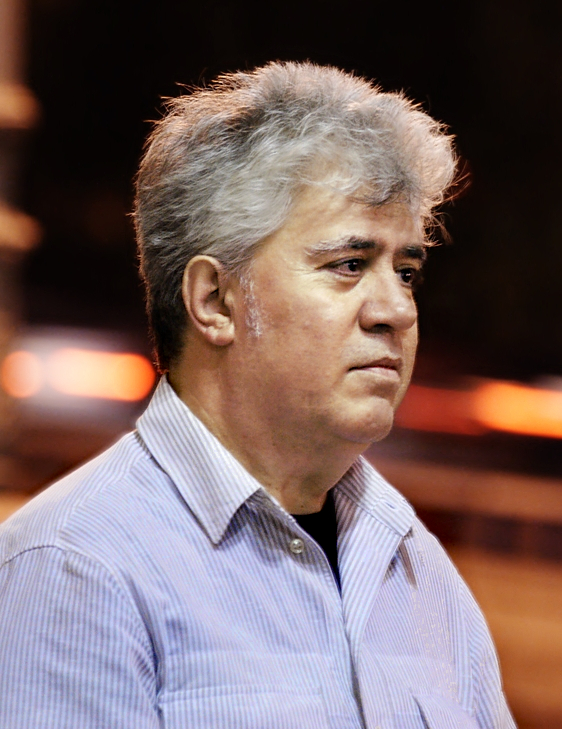
Almodóvar in 2008

A critic from Popmatters notes that Almodóvar is interested in depicting women overcoming tragedies and adversities and the power of close female relationships. Ryan Vlastelica from AVClub wrote: "Many of his characters track a Byzantine plot to a cathartic reunion, a meeting where all can be understood, if not forgiven. They seek redemption". Almodóvar stated that he does not usually write roles for specific actors, but after casting a film, he custom-tailors the characters to suit the actors; he believes his role as a director is a "mirror for the actors – a mirror that can't lie".

Critics believe Almodóvar has redefined perceptions of Spanish cinema and Spain. Many typical images and symbols of Spain, such as bullfighting, gazpacho and flamenco, have been featured in his films; the majority of his films have also been shot in Madrid. Spanish people have been divided in their opinion of Almodóvar's work: while some believe that "Almodóvar has renegotiated what it means to be Spanish and reappropriated its ideals" in a post-Franco Spain, others are concerned with how their essence might be dismissed as "another quirky image from a somewhat exotic and colorful culture" to a casual foreigner. Almodóvar has however acknowledged: "[M]y films are very Spanish, but on the other hand they are capriciously personal. You cannot measure Spain by my films". Almodóvar is generally better received by critics outside of Spain, particularly in France and the USA.

Asked to explain the success of his films, Almodóvar says that they are very entertaining: "It's important not to forget that films are made to entertain. That's the key". He has also been noted for his tendency to shock audiences in his films by featuring outrageous situations or characters, which have served a political or commercial purpose to "tell viewers that if the people on the screen could endure these terrible travails and still communicate, so could they".

Almodóvar believes all his films to be political, "even the most frivolous movie", but claimed that he had never attempted to pursue outright political causes or fight social injustice in his films; merely wanting to entertain and generate emotion. "I'm not a political director. As a filmmaker, my commitment was to want to create free people, completely autonomous from a moral point of view. They are free regardless of their social class or their profession", remarked Almodóvar. However, he admitted that in his earlier films, which were released just after Franco's death, he wanted to create a world on film in which Franco and his repression did not exist, thereby "providing a voice for Spain's marginalized groups".

Almodóvar has incorporated elements of underground and LGBT culture into mainstream forms with wide crossover appeal; academics have recognised the director's significance in queer cinema. Almodóvar dislikes being pigeonholed as a gay filmmaker, but Courtney Young from Pop Matters claimed that he has pushed boundaries by playing with the expectations of gender and sexuality, which places his work in the queer cinematic canon. Young also commented on Almodóvar's fluid idea of sexuality; within his films, LGBT characters do not need to come out as they are already sexually liberated, "enlivening the narrative with complex figures that move beyond trite depictions of the LGBTQI experience". She also wrote about the importance of the relationships between gay men and straight women in Almodóvar's films. In conclusion, Young stated, "Almodóvar is an auteur that designates the queer experience as he sees it the dignity, respect, attention, and recognition it so deserves".

He served as the president of the jury for the 2017 Cannes Film Festival. He was elected a Foreign Honorary Member of the American Academy of Arts and Sciences in 2001.

== Frequent collaborators ==
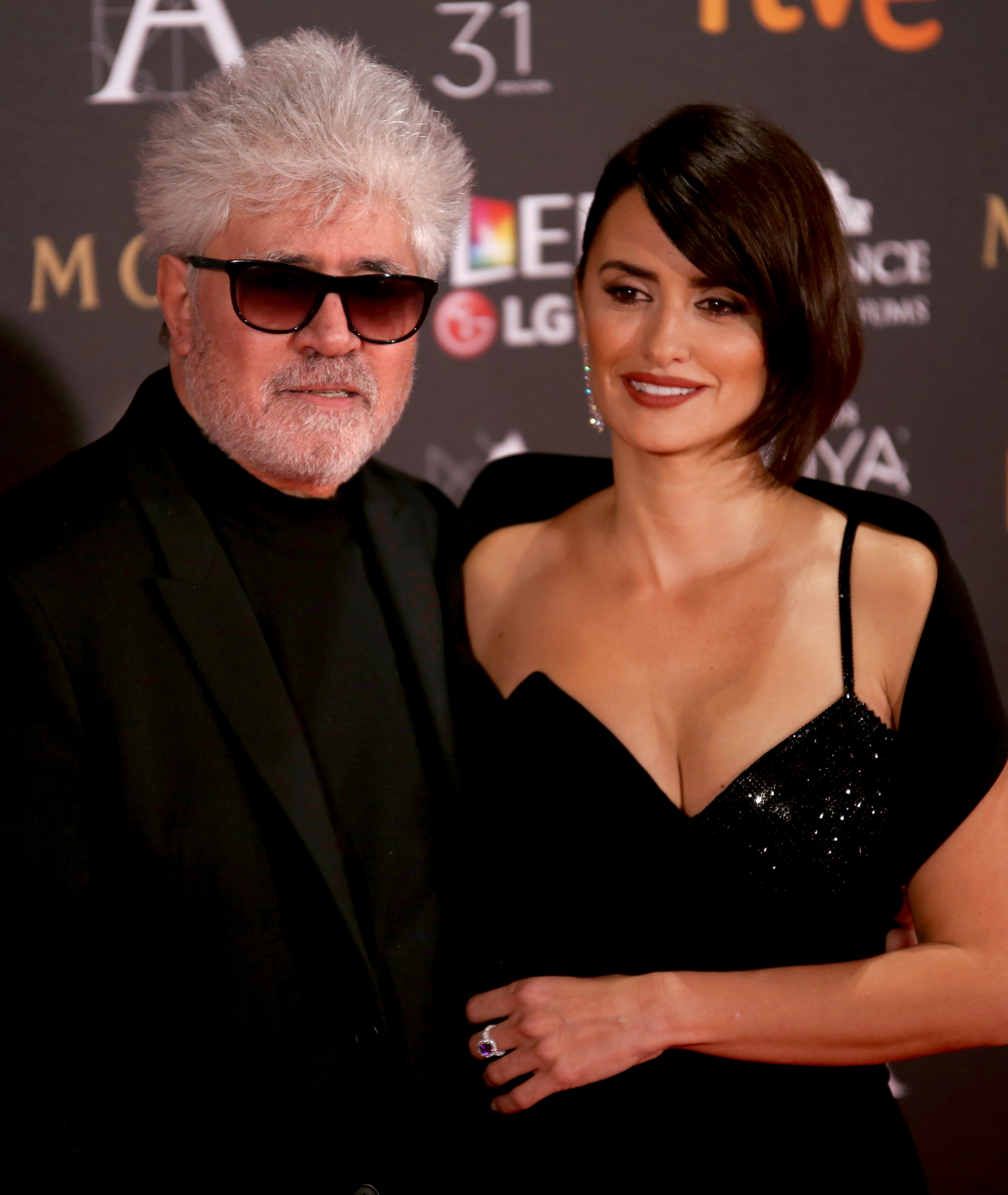
Almodóvar with Penélope Cruz in 2017

Almodóvar often casts certain actors in his films. Actors who have performed in his films 3 or more times in either lead, supporting or cameo roles include Rossy de Palma (9), Chus Lampreave (8), Antonio Banderas (8), Carmen Maura (7), Cecilia Roth (7), Penélope Cruz (7), Julieta Serrano (6), Kiti Mánver (5), Fabio McNamara (5), Marisa Paredes (5), Eva Silva (5), Victoria Abril (4), Lola Dueñas (4), Lupe Barrado (4), Bibiana Fernández (Bibi Andersen) (4), Loles León (3) and Javier Cámara (3). Almodóvar is particularly noted for his work with Spanish actresses and they have become affectionately known as "Almodóvar girls" (chicas Almodóvar).

After setting up El Deseo in 1986, Agustín Almodóvar, Pedro's brother, has produced all of his films since The Law of Desire (1986). Esther García has also been involved in the production of Almodóvar films since 1986. Both of them regularly appear in cameo roles in their films. His mother, Francisca Caballero, made cameos in four films before she died.

Film editor José Salcedo was responsible for editing all of Almodóvar's films from 1980 until his death in 2017. Cinematographer José Luis Alcaine has collaborated on a total of six films with Almodóvar, particularly his most recent films. Their earliest collaboration was on Women on the Verge of a Nervous Breakdown (1988), and their most recent on The Human Voice (2020). Angel Luis Fernández was responsible for cinematography in five of Almodóvar's earlier films in the 1980s, from Labyrinth of Passion (1982) until The Law of Desire (1987). In the 1990s, Almodóvar collaborated with Alfredo Mayo on two films and Affonso Beato on three films.

Composer Bernardo Bonezzi wrote the music for six of his earlier films from Labyrinth of Passion (1982) until Women on the Verge of a Nervous Breakdown (1988). His musical style is intertextually imbued with the compositional language of various classical and film composers such as Erik Satie, Igor Stravinsky, Bernard Hermann and Nino Rota. Since The Flower of My Secret (1995), Alberto Iglesias has composed the music for all of Almodóvar's films.

Art design on Almodóvar's films has invariably been the responsibility of Antxón Gomez in recent years, though other collaborators include Román Arango, Javier Fernández and Pin Morales. Almodóvar's frequent collaborators for costume design include José María de Cossío, Sonia Grande and Paco Delgado. Almodóvar has also worked with designers Jean Paul Gaultier and Gianni Versace on a few films.

Work Actor	1980	1982	1983	1984	1986	1987	1988	1990	1991	1993	1995	1997	1999	2002	2004	2006	2009	2011	2013	2016	2019	2021	2024	2026
Work Actor	Pepi, Luci, Bom	Labyrinth of Passion	Dark Habits	What Have I Done to Deserve This?	Matador	Law of Desire	Women on the Verge of a Nervous Breakdown	Tie Me Up! Tie Me Down!	High Heels	Kika	The Flower of My Secret	Live Flesh	All About My Mother	Talk to Her	Bad Education	Volver	Broken Embraces	The Skin I Live In	I'm So Excited!	Julieta	Pain and Glory	Parallel Mothers	The Room Next Door	Bitter Christmas
Victoria Abril						Yes		Yes	Yes	Yes														
Elena Anaya														Yes				Yes						
Raúl Arévalo																			Yes		Yes		Yes	
Antonio Banderas		Yes			Yes	Yes	Yes	Yes										Yes	Yes		Yes			
Lupe Barrado		Yes				Yes	Yes		Yes															
Javier Cámara														Yes	Yes				Yes					
Penélope Cruz												Yes	Yes			Yes	Yes		Yes		Yes	Yes		
Lola Dueñas																Yes	Yes		Yes					
Bibiana Fernández					Yes	Yes			Yes	Yes														
Verónica Forqué				Yes	Yes					Yes														
Chus Lampreave			Yes	Yes	Yes		Yes				Yes			Yes		Yes	Yes							
Loles León							Yes	Yes						Yes			Yes							
Victoria Luengo																							Yes	Yes
Fabio McNamara	Yes	Yes		Yes	Yes	Yes																		
Kiti Mánver	Yes			Yes		Yes	Yes				Yes						Yes							
Carmen Maura	Yes		Yes	Yes	Yes	Yes	Yes									Yes								
Rossy de Palma						Yes	Yes	Yes		Yes	Yes						Yes			Yes		Yes		Yes
Marisa Paredes			Yes						Yes		Yes		Yes	Yes				Yes						
Eusebio Poncela					Yes	Yes																		
Cecilia Roth	Yes	Yes	Yes	Yes									Yes	Yes					Yes		Yes			
Aitana Sánchez-Gijón																						Yes		Yes
Leonardo Sbaraglia																					Yes			Yes
Assumpta Serna	Yes				Yes																			
Julieta Serrano	Yes		Yes		Yes		Yes	Yes													Yes	Yes		
Eva Siva	Yes		Yes		Yes				Yes															
Milena Smit																						Yes		Yes
Paz Vega														Yes					Yes					

== Personal life ==
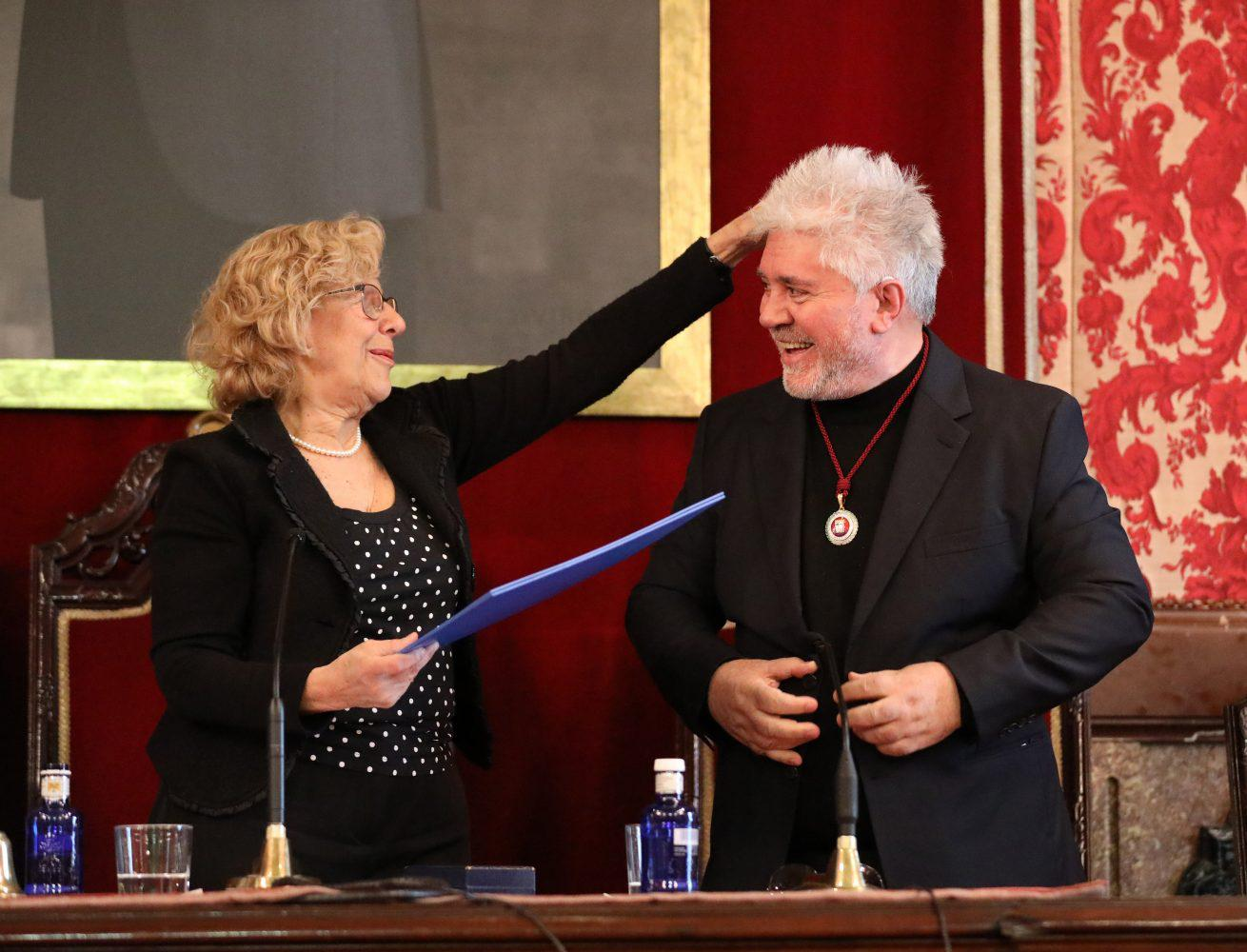
Manuela Carmena and Pedro Almodóvar as the latter receives his honorific title as Adoptive Son of Madrid in April 2018

Almodóvar is gay. He describes himself as having been actively bisexual until the age of 34. He has been with his partner, actor and photographer, Fernando Iglesias, since 2002, and often casts him in small roles in his films. The pair live in separate dwellings in neighbouring districts of Madrid; Almodóvar in Argüelles and Iglesias in Malasaña. Almodóvar used to live on Calle de O'Donnell on the eastern side of the city but moved to his €3 million apartment on Paseo del Pintor Rosales in the west in 2007.

In 2009, Almodóvar signed a petition in support of film director Roman Polanski, calling for his release after Polanski was arrested in Switzerland in relation to his 1977 charge for drugging and raping a 13-year-old girl.

Almodóvar endorsed Democratic candidate Hillary Clinton in the run-up for the 2016 U.S. presidential election.

In April 2018, Almodóvar was recognised as "Adoptive Son of Madrid" by the municipal corporation.

In 2025, Almodóvar signed a letter criticising the film industry's "passivity" before the ongoing Gaza genocide.

In the 2025 documentary miniseries Pedro x Javis, Almodóvar cited Kika and I'm So Excited! as his least favourite pictures of his own filmography, while considering All About My Mother, Talk to Her, and Bad Education to be his most accomplished works.

Panama Papers scandal

In April 2016, a week before his film Julieta was to be released in Spain, Pedro and Agustín Almodóvar were listed in the leak of the Panama Papers from the database of the offshore law firm Mossack Fonseca; their names showed up on the incorporation documents of a company based in the British Virgin Islands between 1991 and 1994. As a result, Pedro cancelled scheduled press, interviews and photocalls he had made for the release of Julieta in Spain. Agustín released a statement in which he declared himself fully responsible, saying that he has always taken charge of financial matters while Pedro has been dedicated to the creative side and hoping that this would not tarnish his brother's reputation.

He also stressed that the brothers have always abided by Spanish tax laws. "On the legal front there are no worries", he explained. "It's a reputation problem which I'm responsible for. I'm really sorry that Pedro has had to suffer the consequences. I have taken full responsibility for what has happened, not because I'm his brother or business partner, but because the responsibility is all mine. I hope that time will put things in its place. We are not under any tax inspection".

The week after the release of Julieta, Pedro gave an interview in which he stated that he knew nothing about the shares as financial matters were handled by his brother, Agustín. However, he emphasised that his ignorance was not an excuse and took full responsibility. Agustín later admitted that he believed Julieta's box office earnings in Spain suffered as a result, as the film reportedly had the worst opening of an Almodóvar film at the Spanish box office in 20 years.

== Filmography ==
=== Feature film ===
Year	English title	Original title	Notes
1980	Pepi, Luci, Bom and Other Girls on the Heap	Pepi, Luci, Bom y otras chicas del montón	
1982	Labyrinth of Passion	Laberinto de pasiones	Also producer
1983	Dark Habits	Entre tinieblas	
1984	What Have I Done to Deserve This?	¿Qué he hecho yo para merecer esto?	
1986	Matador	Matador	
1987	Law of Desire	La ley del deseo	
1988	Women on the Verge of a Nervous Breakdown	Mujeres al borde de un ataque de nervios	Also producer
1989	Tie Me Up! Tie Me Down!	¡Átame!	
1991	High Heels	Tacones lejanos	
1993	Kika	Kika	
1995	The Flower of My Secret	La flor de mi secreto	
1997	Live Flesh	Carne trémula	
1999	All About My Mother	Todo sobre mi madre	
2002	Talk to Her	Hable con ella	
2004	Bad Education	La mala educación	Also producer
2006	Volver	Volver	
2009	Broken Embraces	Los abrazos rotos	
2011	The Skin I Live In	La piel que habito	
2013	I'm So Excited!	Los amantes pasajeros	
2016	Julieta	Julieta	
2019	Pain and Glory	Dolor y gloria	
2021	Parallel Mothers	Madres paralelas	
2024	The Room Next Door	La habitación de al lado	
2026	Bitter Christmas	Amarga Navidad	

=== Short film ===
Year	Title	Notes
1974	Film político	
1974	Dos putas, o historia de amor que termina en boda	
1975	La caída de Sódoma	
1975	Homenaje	
1975	El sueño, o la estrella	
1975	Blancor	
1976	Sea caritativo	
1976	Muerte en la carretera	
1977	Sexo va, sexo viene	
1978	Salomé	
1985	Tráiler para amantes de lo prohibido!	TV short
1996	Pastas Ardilla	TV advert
2009	La concejala antropófaga	Credited as "Mateo Blanco" (director) and as "Harry 'Huracán' Caine" (writer)
2020	The Human Voice	
2023	Strange Way of Life	

== Awards and nominations ==
Year	Title	Academy Awards		BAFTA Awards		Golden Globe Awards		Goya Awards	
Year	Title	Nominations	Wins	Nominations	Wins	Nominations	Wins	Nominations	Wins
1986	Matador							1	
1988	Women on the Verge of a Nervous Breakdown	1		1		1		16	5
1991	High Heels					1		5	
1997	Live Flesh			1				3	1
1999	All About My Mother	1	1	3	2	1	1	14	7
2002	Talk to Her	2	1	2	2	1		7	1
2004	Bad Education			1				4	
2006	Volver	1		2		2		14	5
2009	Broken Embraces			1		1		5	1
2011	The Skin I Live In			1	1	1		16	4
2013	I'm So Excited!							1	
2016	Julieta			1				7	1
2019	Pain and Glory	2		1		2		16	7
2021	Parallel Mothers	2		1		2		8	
2024	The Room Next Door					1		10	3
Total		9	2	14	5	13	1	137	35

== See also ==
- List of Spanish Academy Award winners and nominees
- List of LGBTQ Academy Award winners and nominees
