= Julieta Serrano =

Spanish actress

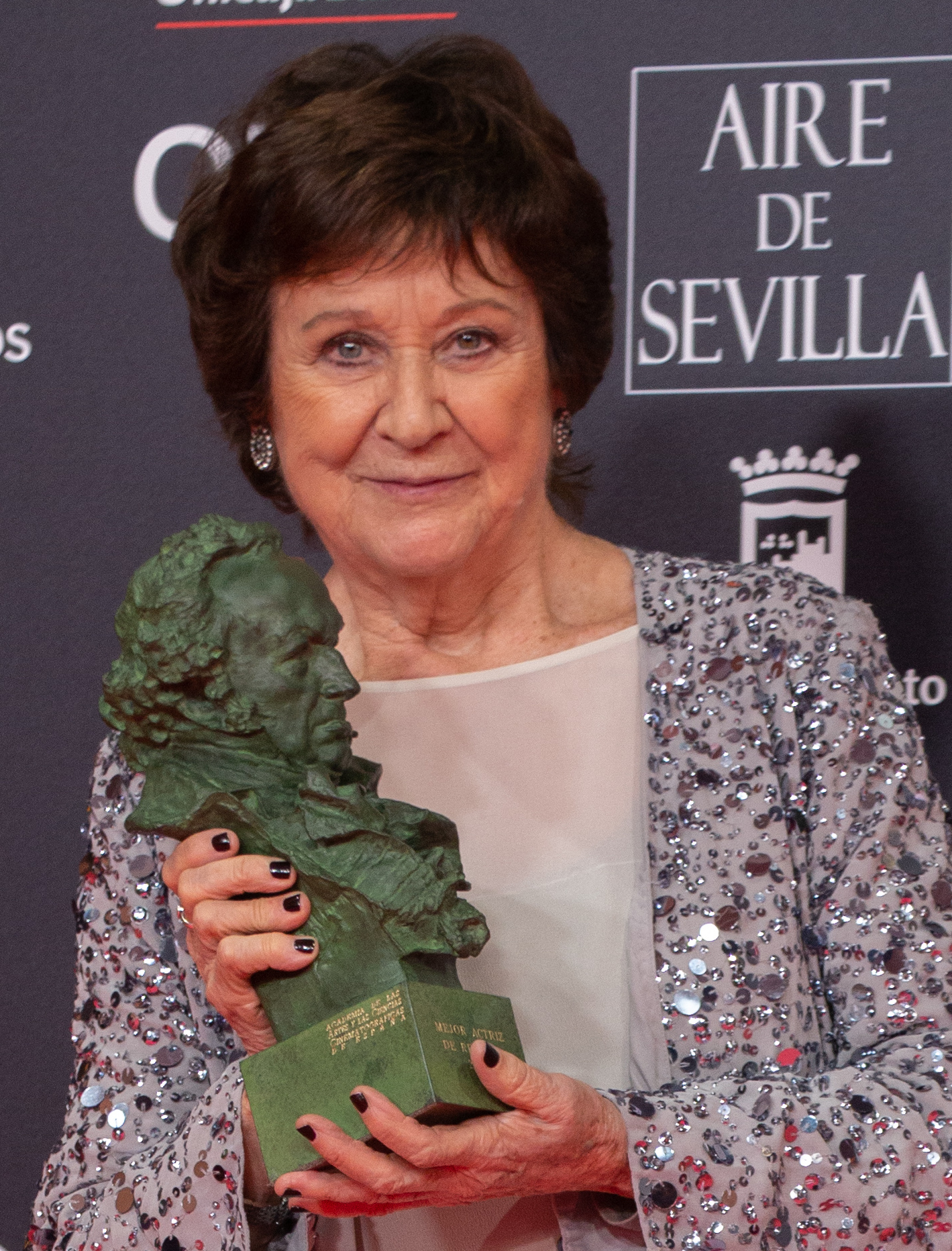
- Serrano at the 34th Goya Awards in 2020
- Born: Julieta Serrano Romero; 2 January 1933 (age 93); Barcelona, Spain
- Occupation: Actress
- Awards: Premio Honorario Gaudi (2014); Premio Nacional de Teatro (2018)

Julieta Serrano Romero (born 2 January 1933 in Barcelona, Catalonia, Spain) is a Spanish theatre and cinema actress. Her prolific career began in the 1960s, and she has worked with directors Pedro Almodóvar and Ventura Pons.

In September 2018, she was awarded by the Premio Nacional de Teatro. She won the Goya Award for Best Supporting Actress for Dolor y gloria (2019) and received additional nominations for Mujeres al borde de un ataque de nervios (1988) and Cuando vuelvas a mi lado (1999).

== Selected filmography ==
- Secuestro en la ciudad (1965)
- El juego de la oca (1966) .... Compañera de Ángela
- Crónica de nueve meses (1967) .... Luisa
- Forty Degrees in the Shade (1967) .... Dorotea
- Laia (1970, Short) .... (voice)
- El hombre oculto (1971) .... Clara
- Tirarse al monte (1971)
- Mi querida señorita (1972) .... Isabelita
- Laia (1972) .... Pauline
- Marianela (1972) .... La Canela
- Zumo (1972, Short)
- Abismo (1972, Short)
- La prima Angélica (1974) .... Monja
- Vera, un cuento cruel (1974) .... María
- El amor del capitán Brando (1974) .... María Rosa
- Grandeur nature (1974) .... Nicole
- Cría Cuervos (1976) .... Ana (voice)
- In memoriam (1977)
- Carne apaleada (1978) .... Mercedes
- Vámonos, Bárbara (1978) .... Paula
- Soldados (1978) .... Librera
- La familia, bien, gracias (1979) .... Carlota
- Cuentos eróticos (1980) .... Gloria (segment "La tilita")
- Pepi, Luci, Bom y otras chicas del montón (1980) .... Mujer vestida como Escarlata O'Hara
- Yo qué sé (1980, Short)
- Cuentos para una escapada (1981)
- La mujer del ministro (1981) .... Angelina
- Entre tinieblas (1983) .... Superiora
- Un genio en apuros (1983) .... Julia
- Cuerpo a cuerpo (1984)
- El caballero del dragón (1985) .... Dama de compañía
- Matador (1986) .... Berta
- Tata mía (1986) .... Magda
- Iniciativa privada (1986, Short)
- El pecador impecable (1987) .... María
- Material urbà (1987) .... Mare
- Mujeres al borde de un ataque de nervios (1988) .... Lucía
- ¡Átame! (1990) .... Alma
- Monte bajo (1989)
- Ho sap el ministre? (1991) .... Carmen
- Salsa rosa (1992) .... Mariluz
- El Amante Bilingüe (1993) .... Madre de Juan
- La febre d'Or (1993) .... Paula Balenyà
- Cràpules (1993)
- Continuum (1994)
- Nexo (1995) .... Vecina
- La novia moderna (1995, Short) .... Julieta
- Alma gitana (1996) .... Pilar
- Un cos al bosc (1996) .... Marieta
- La Moños (1996) .... La Moños
- La parabólica (1996, Short) .... Vieja
- Carícies (1998) .... Dona gran
- Cuando vuelvas a mi lado (1999) .... Tía Rafaela
- Marta y alrededores (1999)
- Nosotras (2000) .... Magdalena
- Sagitario (2001) .... Andrónica
- Arderás conmigo (2002) .... Irene
- Treinta y cinco (2004, Short) .... María
- La mirada violeta (2004) .... Madre Violeta
- ¿Y a mí quién me cuida? (2006, TV Movie) .... Ana
- A Tram in SP (2008) .... María
- Opération Casablanca (2010) .... Mme Rueda
- Mil cretins (2011) .... Hortènsia
- La última isla (2012) .... Belinda
- Villaviciosa de al lado (2016) .... Petra
- The Warning (2018) .... Asunción
- Dolor y gloria (2019) .... Jacinta
- Parallel Mothers (2021)..... Tía Brígida

== Theatre ==
- Tots eren fills meus
- La casa de Bernarda Alba
- La profesión de la Sra. Warren
- Les alegres casades de Windsor (The Merry Wives of Windsor by William Shakespeare)
- Espectres (Ghosts by Henrik Ibsen)
- Viaje de un largo día hacia la noche
- Don Juan último
- Orquídeas a la luz de la luna
- Quatre dones i el sol
- Interview de Mrs. Muerta Smith con sus fantasmas
- La senyora de Sade
- Coriolano (Coriolanus by William Shakespeare)
- Antígona entre muros
- Los abrazos del pulpo
- La gata sobre el tejado de zinc (Cat on a Hot Tin Roof by Tennessee Williams)
- Maria Rosa by Àngel Guimerà
- Un hombre es un hombre (Man Equals Man by Bertolt Brecht)
- Motín de brujas by Josep Maria Benet i Jornet
- Veraneantes (Summerfolk by Maxim Gorky).
- La casa de Bernarda Alba
- La irresistible ascensión del Rey Arturo VI (The Resistible Rise of Arturo Ui by Bertolt Brecht).
- Las criadas
- Las Mocedades del Cid
- El rey Lear (King Lear by William Shakespeare)
- Los melindres de Belisa
- La casa de Bernarda Alba
- Los verdes campos del Edén
- Un mes en el campo
- El caballero de Olmedo de Lope de Vega
- Un tranvía llamado deseo (A Streetcar Named Desire (play) by Tennessee Williams).
- La loca de Chaillot
- Delito en la isla de las Cabras
- Antígona (Antigone by Jean Anouilh).

== Television ==
- Temps de silenci.
- Mirall trencat.
