= José Salcedo (film editor) =

Spanish film editor

- José Salcedo at the Valladolid International Film Festival in 2008.
- Born: 1949; Ciudad Real, Spain
- Died: 19 September 2017 (aged 68); Madrid, Spain
- Occupation: film editor

José Salcedo Palomeque (c. 1949 – 19 September 2017) was a Spanish film editor with over 120 feature film credits. He had an extended collaboration with the director Pedro Almodóvar, having edited all of Almodóvar's films from 1980 until his death.

Salcedo had been nominated many times for Goya Award for Best Editing, and won the award three times: for Women on the Verge of a Nervous Breakdown (1988), Nobody Will Speak of Us When We're Dead (1995), and All About My Mother (1999). He was honored with the 2017 Gold Medal of the Academia de las Artes y las Ciencias Cinematográficas de España, which is the Spanish academy that awards the Goyas.

== Filmography ==
- The Disenchantment (1976)
- Black Litter (1977)
- El corazón del bosque (1979)
- La Sabina (1979)
- Navajeros (1980)
- Pepi, Luci, Bom (1980). Salcedo's first collaboration with director Pedro Almodóvar.
- Maravillas (1981)
- The Minister’s Wife (1981)
- Labyrinth of Passion (1982)
- Demons in the Garden (1982)
- Colegas (1982)
- Dark Habits (1983)
- What Have I Done to Deserve This? (1984)
- Matador (1986)
- Law of Desire (1987)
- Rowing with the Wind (1988)
- Women on the Verge of a Nervous Breakdown (1988). Nominated for the Academy Award for Best Foreign Language Film.
- Tie Me Up! Tie Me Down! (1989)
- Don Juan in Hell (1991)
- High Heels (1991)
- The Legend of the North Wind (1992)
- Kika (1993)
- King of the River (1995)
- Nobody Will Speak of Us When We're Dead (1995)
- The Flower of My Secret (1995)
- Blinded (1997)
- Love of a Man (1997)
- Live Flesh (1997)
- Doña Bárbara (1998)
- Between Your Legs (1999)
- All About My Mother (1999). The film won the Academy Award for Best Foreign Language Film.
- Km. 0 (2000)
- Leo (2000)
- Don't Tempt Me (2001)
- Talk to Her (2002)
- Bad Education (2004)
- Queens (2005)
- Life and Colour (2005)
- Volver (2006)
- Alatriste (2006)
- Just Walking (2008)
- Broken Embraces (2009)
- The Skin I Live In (2011)
- I'm So Excited (2013)
- La ignorancia de la sangre (2014)
- Julieta (2016). Salcedo's last film with Almodóvar.
- Nadie Muere en Ambrosia (2020). Salcedo's last film.

== See also ==
- List of film director and editor collaborations
