= Tie Me Up! Tie Me Down! =

1989 film by Pedro Almodóvar

- Theatrical release poster
- Spanish: ¡Átame!
- Directed by: Pedro Almodóvar
- Written by: Pedro Almodóvar; Yuyi Beringola
- Produced by: Agustín Almodóvar; Enrique Posner
- Starring: Victoria Abril; Antonio Banderas; Loles León; Francisco Rabal; Julieta Serrano; María Barranco; Rossy de Palma
- Cinematography: José Luis Alcaine
- Edited by: José Salcedo
- Music by: Ennio Morricone
- Production company: El Deseo S.A.
- Distributed by: Lauren Films
- Release dates: 12 December 1989 (Madrid premiere); 26 January 1990 (Spain)
- Running time: 101 minutes
- Country: Spain
- Language: Spanish
- Box office: $8 million

Tie Me Up! Tie Me Down! (Spanish: ¡Átame!, pronounced [ˈa.ta.me], "Tie Me Up!") is a 1989 Spanish black romantic comedy film co-written and directed by Pedro Almodóvar, starring Victoria Abril and Antonio Banderas alongside Loles León, Francisco Rabal, Julieta Serrano, María Barranco, and Rossy de Palma. The plot follows a recently released psychiatric patient who kidnaps an actress in order to make her fall in love with him. He believes his destiny is to marry her and father her children.

The film was highly successful with both critics and audiences in Spain. Its United States release was entangled in controversy, instrumental in the implementation by the MPAA of a new rating category, NC-17, for films of an explicit nature that were previously categorized as pornographic due to the X rating.

== Plot ==
Ricky, a 23-year-old patient, has been deemed cured and is released from a psychiatric hospital in which he was raised. He has been the lover of the hospital's female director, who gives him a monetary gift as a farewell. An orphan, free, and alone, his goal is to have a normal life with actress Marina Osorio, a former porn star and recovering drug addict, with whom he once slept during an escape from the asylum.

At a studio, Marina is filming The Midnight Phantom, a Euro-horror film about a mutilated, masked muscleman in love with her character. The film is directed by Máximo Espejo, an elderly director who uses a wheelchair after a stroke. A mentor to Marina, Máximo threatens to throw out a journalist who mentions the words "porn" and "junkie" in her presence. Máximo is secretly attracted to Marina and plans to enjoy what could be his last experience of directing a female lead.

At the film’s set, Ricky steals items from Marina's dressing room, including the keys to her apartment. Wearing a stolen wig, Ricky does a handstand to try to capture Marina's attention and impress her, but failing to remember him, she dismisses him.

After filming the last scene, Marina goes home to change for the wrap party. Ricky follows her to her apartment and overhears her neighbor telling Marina that he will be away for the summer. When Ricky rings the bell and Marina answers the door, he forces his way inside. Grabbing and headbutting her unconscious to silence her screams, he binds her with rope and tapes her mouth. Marina wakes up with a toothache normal painkillers do not relieve, since she is addicted to stronger drugs. Ricky explains that he has captured her so she will get to know him better and fall in love; they will then marry and have children. Enraged at being handcuffed, gagged and lashed to the bed, Marina declares she will never love him. Undeterred, Ricky remains determined to win her heart. To avoid being discovered, Ricky moves Marina to her neighbor's empty apartment. He is unaware that the neighbor has left his keys with Lola, Marina’s reliable sister, entrusted with watering his plants while he is away.

Shocked and in pain, Marina persuades Ricky to take her to a doctor who can prescribe effective painkillers. Ricky briefly leaves her alone with the doctor; however, the doctor keeps talking over her and she is unable to communicate her plight. When the prescription cannot be filled in the after-hours pharmacy, Ricky resorts to buying the painkillers on the black market. Rather than paying the street price, he attacks the dealer to steal the tablets.

Meanwhile, during the wrap party, Lola, the film's assistant director, steals the show with a musical number. Worried about her sister's disappearance, Lola visits Marina's apartment and leaves a note.

In the street again, Ricky is spotted by the dealer he attacked; the dealer's associates beat and rob Ricky, leaving him unconscious. During his absence, Marina unsuccessfully tries to escape from her captivity. When Ricky returns covered with blood and cuts, she is touched by his vulnerability and devotion to her. She cleans and sterilizes his wounds, suddenly struck by the realization that she has fallen in love with her captor. They eventually have sex and decide to visit Ricky's hometown.

Before leaving to steal a car for the trip, Ricky asks whether he can trust her to stay; Marina tells him to tie her up again to ensure that she does not escape. In Ricky's absence, Lola enters the apartment to water the plants, discovers Marina tied up, and rescues her. Marina informs Lola that she is in love with her captor. Lola is astonished, but Marina convinces her to drive them to Ricky's hometown. They find him in the ruins of his family house in a deserted village. Lola accepts Ricky as a member of the family, saying she will find him a job within the week. Marina begins to cry, and the three drive back to the city together, singing "Resistiré" ("I Will Resist") in unison.

== Cast ==
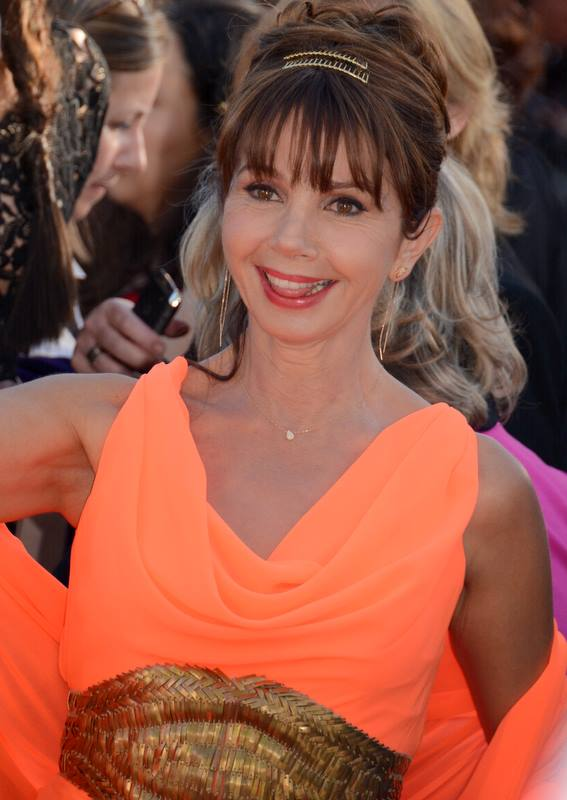
Victoria Abril plays Marina Osorio, a former porn star and recovering drug addict, who Ricky captures in hope of winning her love.

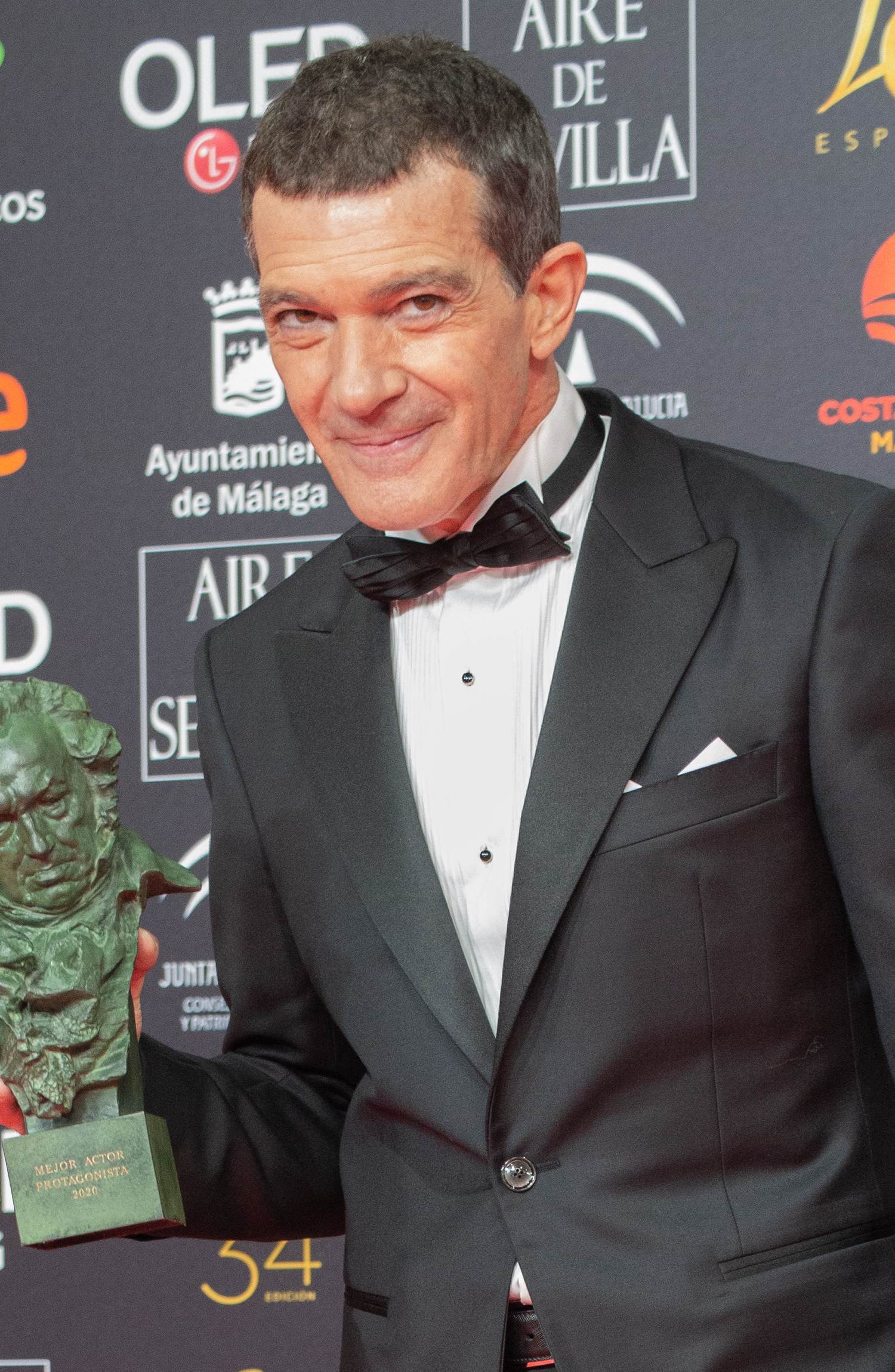
Antonio Banderas plays Ricky, a psychiatric patient, obsessed with Marina Osorio, with whom he had a one night stand during an escape from the asylum.

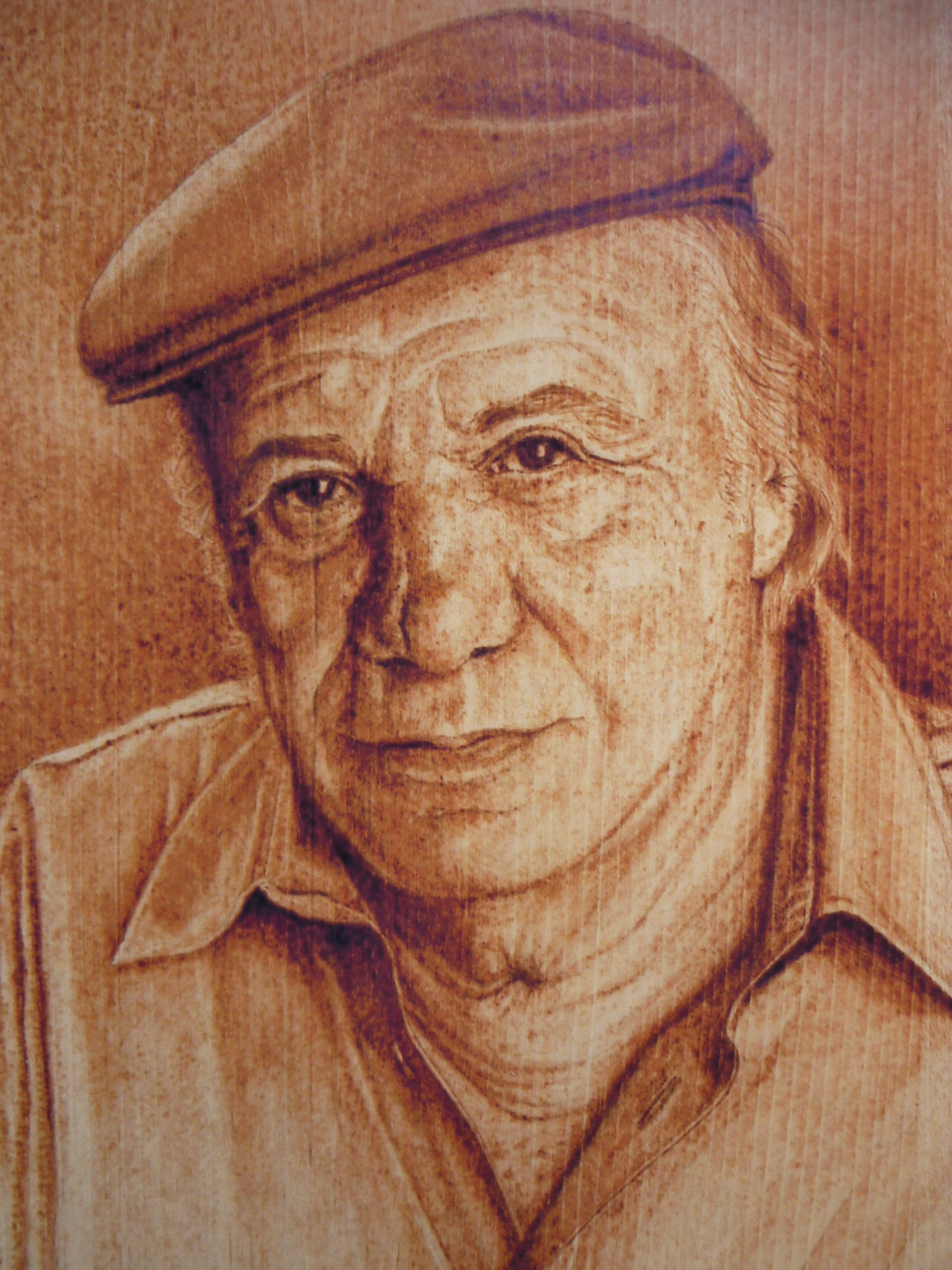
Francisco Rabal plays Máximo Espejo, the director of The Midnight Phantom, a Euro-horror film, is attracted to Marina.

Loles León plays Lola Osorio, the assistant director of The Midnight Phantom, who is worried about her sister Marina's disappearance.

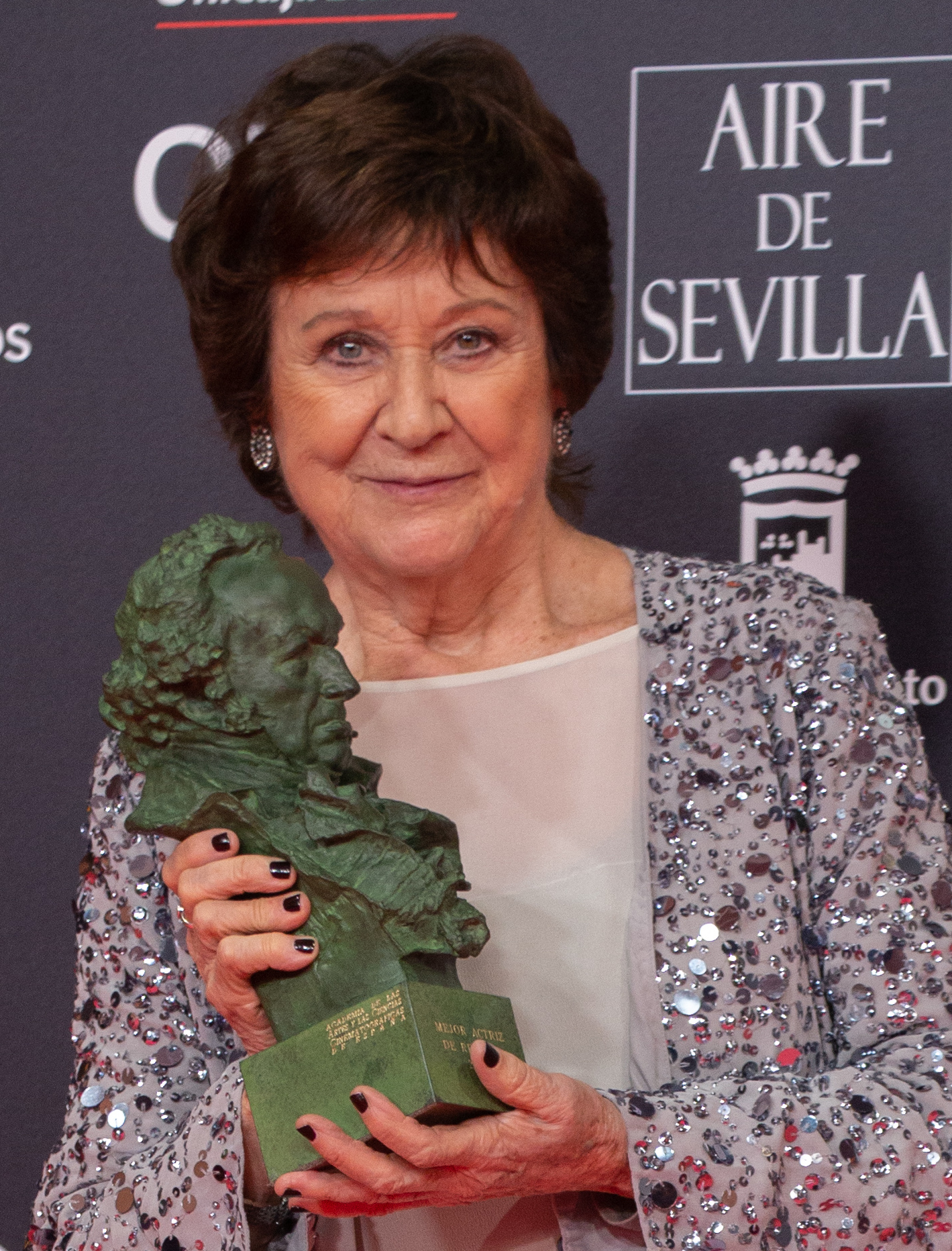
Julieta Serrano plays Alma, wife of Máximo Espejo, who tolerates with exasperated patience his infatuation with Marina.

Rossy de Palma plays the drug dealer Ricky attacks to steal painkillers.

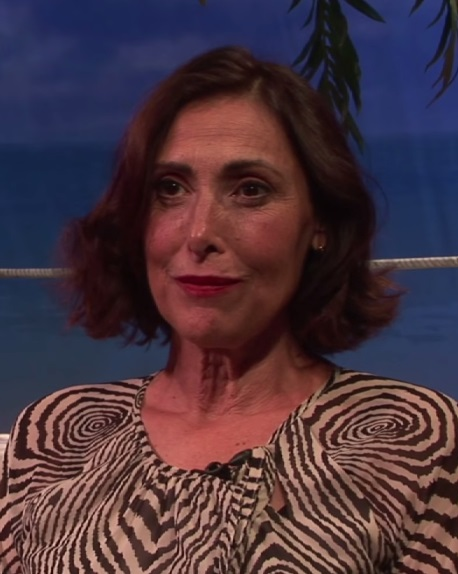
María Barranco plays Berta, a doctor who treats Marina's toothache, but who fails to understand Marina's plight.

- Victoria Abril as Marina Osorio
- Antonio Banderas as Ricky
- Loles León as Lola Osorio
- Francisco Rabal as Máximo Espejo
- Julieta Serrano as Alma Espejo
- María Barranco as Berta, doctor
- Rossy de Palma as drug dealer on scooter
- Lola Cardona as hospital director
- Francisca Caballero as Marina's mother

== Production ==
=== Casting ===
Tie Me Up! Tie Me Down! marked Almodóvar's breaking-up with his longtime star, Carmen Maura, in a rift that took many years to heal. In any case, at the age of 44, Maura was too old to play the protagonist, a role that demanded a younger actress. The film was the beginning of a fruitful collaboration with Victoria Abril, whom Almodóvar had previously considered for the role of Cristal, the prostitute neighbor in What Have I Done to Deserve This? (1984), and Candela, the model fleeing a relationship with a terrorist in Women on the Verge of a Nervous Breakdown (1988). Abril had a cameo role in Law of Desire, and was already a well-established actress, identified with strong female characters.

The male lead was played by Banderas, in his fifth and most important collaboration with Almodóvar. His role in Tie Me Up! Tie Me Down! launched his career in American films. Loles Léon, a stand-up comedian, plays Marina's sassy sister Lola. She had previously appeared as the meddlesome telephonist in Women on the Verge of a Nervous Breakdown. Francisco Rabal, one of Spain's foremost actors, took the role of the film director. Almodóvar cast his own mother, Francisca Caballero, as Marina's mother. Rossy de Palma, the actress of Picassoesque appearance discovered by Almodóvar in 1986, plays the small role of the drug dealer.

=== Analysis ===
The Spanish title ¡Átame! literally means "Tie Me Up!", while the second part of the English title, "Tie Me Down!", is presumably intended to suggest the idea of a lasting relationship. Almodóvar has consistently denied that the ropes within Tie Me Up! Tie Me Down! have any links with sadomasochism. There is no erotic charge to the ropes and gags. He explained:

Tie Me Up! Tie Me Down! is essentially a love story, or rather a story of how someone attempts to construct a love story in the same way as he might study for a degree: by means of effort, will power, and persistence...when you have nothing, like my main character, you have to force everything. Including love. Ricky has only (as the flamenco singers say) the night, the day, and the vitality of an animal.

Ricky's stated ambition is to be a good husband to Marina and a good father to their children. Indeed, the relationship between Marina and Ricky is meant, ultimately, to be a parody of how such relationships work, as if heterosexuality (and its consequence, marriage) are almost inevitably equivalent in character to the infamous Stockholm syndrome. The cords that tie us one to another become literal ropey metaphors in the film. It is a tale not of kinky sex, but of a sweeter human bondage, of loose ends tied into lover's knots.

Tie Me Up! Tie Me Down! follows in the myth of Beauty and the Beast and the notion that the savagery of the Beast is, in the presence of Beauty, tamed by gentler feelings. This has been a recurrent theme in films such as King Kong (1933), Tarzan the Ape Man (1932) and Frankenstein (1931). This theme is also present in Spanish Literature. In the play Life Is a Dream, by Calderon de la Barca, the main character is Segismundo, a half-man, half-beast who has been imprisoned for his whole twenty years; once released into the world, he finds that his violence is tamed by female beauty.

The abduction narrative of Tie Me Up! Tie Me Down! has some similarities with the film The Collector (1965), directed by William Wyler, in which a butterfly specialist abducts a young woman in order to add her to his collection. The Collector was adapted from the eponymous novel by John Fowles. In style, theme and plot details, however, Tie Me Up! Tie Me Down! differs greatly from Wyler's film and the novel that inspired it. Bride kidnapping is also a central plot device in the Hollywood musical Seven Brides for Seven Brothers (1954).

=== Genre ===
Tie Me Up! Tie Me Down! combines two different film genres: romantic comedy and horror film. In spite of some dark elements, it can be described as a romantic comedy, and the director's clearest love story. Almodóvar described the film as a "romantic fairy tale". Ricky, in his violent courtship of Marina follows, in an exaggerated manner, the path of the romantic film genre like those made popular in the late 1950s by Doris Day with various male film stars: Pillow Talk (1959) with Rock Hudson, Move Over, Darling (1963) with James Garner, and That Touch of Mink (1962) with Cary Grant.

Tie Me Up! Tie Me Down! is also rooted on the tradition of the horror film genre. Marina plays the lead in the horror film The Midnight Phantom, in which she defeats the Phantom's attempt to kill her, overcoming him and thus subverting the horror film tradition of a woman as victim, in a way that parallels Marina's relationship with Ricky. While filming The Midnight Phantom, Lola notes that the film they are working on is 'more a love story than a horror story', to which Maximo the director replies, "sometimes they're indistinguishable". The Midnight Phantom is not simply a film within the film: just as the girl in The Midnight Phantom defeats the monster, so ultimately Marina will succeed in taming Ricky. In a way, Tie Me Up! Tie Me Down! is an extension of The Midnight Phantom and both films mix variant versions of Beauty and the Beast that are within the genres of horror and romance. Tie Me Up! Tie Me Down! also makes reference to two horror films: Invasion of the Body Snatchers (1956) and Night of the Living Dead (1968). Máximo has a poster of the former in his editing room, and Marina watches the latter while Ricky is away.

=== Music ===
The soundtrack was composed by Ennio Morricone in the style of a thriller, and is reminiscent of Bernard Herrmann's score for Alfred Hitchcock's Psycho (1960). Almodóvar admired Morricone's soundtracks for westerns, but found the music for Tie Me Up! Tie Me Down! conventional and uninspiring, too similar to Morricone's work for the film Frantic, and used only half of Morricone's music.

Tie Me Up! Tie Me Down! prominently features two songs. The film closes with the theme "Resistiré" ("I Will Resist") by Dúo Dinámico, a Spanish pop duo from the 1960s, suggesting Marina's happy resistance to Ricky's unconventional courtship. The wrap party scene breaks the hardship of the kidnapping scene. It presents Marina's sister Lola, played by Loles León, singing the bolero "Canción del Alma", a song popularized in Latin America by Alfredo Sadel.

== Reception ==
Tie Me Up! Tie Me Down!, Almodóvar's eighth film, was completed in late 1989. Its premiere at the Berlin Film Festival in early 1990, was inauspicious. The projector broke down and in the following press conference Almodóvar, whose films have not been well understood in Germany, was subjected to heavy questioning about his homosexuality, drug abuse, and the Spanishness of his film.

Released in Spain in January 1990, Tie Me Up! Tie Me Down! was an enormous success, becoming the highest-grossing domestic film of its year, reaching an audience of over a million. It had twice the audience of the most critically acclaimed Spanish film of that year, Carlos Saura's ¡Ay, Carmela!, a film starring Almodóvar's former muse Carmen Maura.

The film was generally well received by Spanish critics. Lluis Bonet, writing in La Vanguardia, called the film "a terrible tender love story", agreeing with the director that the best scene was that in which Marina, initially held hostage by Ricky against her will, finally asks to be tied up by him so she will not be tempted to flee from the love he has successfully provoked in her. Critic Javier Maqua in Cinco Días called Marina's request evidence of "the greatest intensity of love". Rossy de Palma, who plays a drug dealer in the film, explained that the film's kidnapping was not to be imitated in real life and was only justified by the "exceptional nature of the characters".

British critics took time to warm to Almodóvar's films and dismissed Tie Me Up! Tie Me Down!. Lawrence O'Toole of Sight and Sound described it as "fairly banal, schematic and essentially humorless".

In the United States, the film was met with opposition from rating agencies and the public due to a lengthy sex scene and two sequences in which Marina and later her sister Lola sit on the toilet to urinate. Particularly controversial was the shot of Marina in a bath tub, pleasuring herself with a scuba diver toy. Tie Me Up! Tie Me Down! was entangled in a rating classification battle and was the subject of heated debate. Eventually released unrated, the film was decried by feminists and women's advocacy groups for its sadomasochist overtones and portrayal of successful female abduction and abuse. Modern audiences have criticized Almodóvar for "... condon[ing] Ricky's behavior, suggesting that it's okay to brutalize and subjugate a woman so long as one is allegedly motivated by sincere passion". On the review aggregator website Rotten Tomatoes, the film has an approval rating of 69% based on 32 reviews, with an average score of 6.20/10. The site's critics consensus reads: "Tie Me Up! Tie Me Down! undermines its own effectiveness with an excess of camp, but writer-director Pedro Almodóvar and an attractive cast make it all worth watching." On Metacritic the film has a score of 55% based on reviews from 14 critics, indicating "mixed or average reviews".

=== Box office ===
Tie Me Up! Tie Me Down! grossed $4,087,361 at the North American box office.

== Controversy ==
There was a legal battle over the decision by the Motion Picture Association of America (MPAA), which determines film ratings in the United States, to give Tie Me Up! Tie Me Down! an X rating, which, by that point, had become heavily associated with pornography. This marginalized its distribution and reduced its chance of box-office success. Miramax, the film's distribution company in North America, filed a lawsuit against the MPAA over the X rating. When the case came to court in New York, it gave rise to a general debate on cinema, censorship, and sexuality in the United States.

The attorney for Miramax claimed that the AAP (Average American Parent) was not well served by a system that was lenient on films with hard violence and drug use, while being harsh with films depicting sex. Miramax lost its case in court, and the film was ultimately released unrated. However, numerous other filmmakers had complained about the X rating given to their films, and in September 1990, the MPAA dropped the X rating and replaced it with the NC-17 rating, with Henry & June as the first film released with the new rating. This was especially helpful to films of an explicit nature that were previously assumed to be pornographic because of the X rating. Tie Me Up! Tie Me Down! itself would eventually be given that rating for a "scene of strong adult sensuality with nudity."

== Home video ==
Tie Me Up! Tie Me Down! was released on Region 1 DVD in Spanish with English subtitles. It includes the film's trailer, but there are no other extras. The Region 2 DVD, released in the UK, includes an interview of Almodóvar by Banderas, footage of the premiere in Madrid, poster and still galleries, and trailers.

On 19 August 2014, the film was re-released on DVD and Blu-ray by The Criterion Collection in the United States. A new documentary produced by Criterion was included among the extras, including some that were ported over from previous releases.
