= Labyrinth of Passion =

1982 film by Pedro Almodóvar

- Theatrical release poster by Iván Zulueta
- Spanish: Laberinto de pasiones
- Directed by: Pedro Almodóvar
- Written by: Pedro Almodóvar
- Produced by: Luis Briales
- Starring: Cecilia Roth; Imanol Arias; Helga Liné; Marta Fernández Muro
- Cinematography: Angel L. Fernández
- Edited by: José Salcedo
- Music by: Bernardo Bonezzi
- Production company: Alphaville
- Distributed by: Musidora
- Release date: 29 September 1982 (Spain)
- Running time: 100 minutes
- Country: Spain
- Language: Spanish
- Budget: ESP 21 million
- Box office: ESP 98.6 million (Spain)

Labyrinth of Passion (Spanish: Laberinto de pasiones) is a 1982 Spanish screwball comedy film written and directed by Pedro Almodóvar, starring Cecilia Roth and Imanol Arias. Antonio Banderas has a small role, marking his film debut.

Labyrinth of Passion, Almodóvar's second film, was independently produced with a shoestring budget which allowed for better production values than his previous film Pepi, Luci, Bom, and to employ a more complex narrative.

The plot follows a nymphomaniac pop star who falls in love with a gay Middle Eastern prince. Their unlikely destiny is to find one another, overcome their sexual preferences and live happily ever after on a tropical island. Although poorly received by Spanish film critics, Labyrinth of Passion was a modest success and quickly achieved cult film status. The film is an outrageous look at love and sex, set in Madrid in the early 1980s, during the so-called Movida madrileña, a period of sexual adventurousness after the end of Franco's authoritarian regime and before the rise of AIDS consciousness.

== Plot ==
Sexilia ("Sexi") is a pop star and sex addict; Riza is the gay son of the Emperor of Tiran (a fictional Middle Eastern country). Both are strolling around Madrid's flea market, trying to pick up lovers. Sexilia takes two men for an orgy in which she is the only woman. In the hope of curing her nymphomania and her fear of the sun, she is undergoing psychotherapy. However, her psychoanalyst, Susana, is far more interested in sleeping with Sexila's father, Doctor de la Peña, a gynecologist specializing in artificial insemination. As the doctor is frigid, Susana has no chance with him. One of Doctor de la Peña's patients is Princess Toraya, the ex-wife of the former Emperor of Tiran. Flicking through a magazine, Toraya discovers that her stepson Riza Nero is also in town. Thanks to treatment by Sexilia's father, Toraya is now fertile for the first time in her life. Since the emperor's sperm is currently unavailable to her, she decides to settle for that of his son, Riza, whom she attempts to track down.

In Madrid, Riza is living incognito, constantly wearing a wig and dark glasses. He gets involved first with Fabio, a young junkie transvestite. Later he meets Sadec on the street and the two go to Sadec's place for a tryst. Ironically, Sadec is a member of a group of terrorists looking for Riza, but he fails to recognize the Emperor's son in disguise. When Riza realizes that Sadec is also from Tiran, he decides to change his hair and clothes in order to protect his anonymity. With Fabio's help, Riza transforms into a punk. Sexilia and Riza, who knew each other when they were children, meet again when Riza, disguised as "Johnny", is performing as the lead singer with a punk band in the absence of their regular singer. That night, they fall in love but do not sleep together. The two opt for a chaste relationship since each wants this relationship to be "different".

Making time in her busy schedule for her laundry, Sexilia meets Queti, a young woman who works in a dry-cleaner owned by her father. Her mother skipped out on her father a few weeks earlier and the father, who takes Vitapens to stimulate his sex drive and potency, pretends to mistake Queti for her mother and binds her to the bed and rapes her on alternate days, despite the fact that Queti regularly laces his tea with a libido-suppressing chemical called Benzamuro. In search of consolation, Queti dresses up in the clothes of her role model Sexilia. One day Sexilia spots Queti in the street wearing one of her outfits and confronts her. They become friends. Queti tells Sexilia about the problem with her father and Sexilia tells her that she cannot stop thinking about Riza. Sexilia and Riza mutual adoration has "cured" Riza's compulsive homosexuality and Sexilia's nymphomania. Queti and Sexilia hatch a plan: they agree to swap identities so that Queti can escape her father's sexual abuse and take on the role of Sexilia for real. This would allow Sexilia to escape with her lover Riza. However, Toraya finally catches up with Riza and seduces him. When Sexilia goes to Riza's hotel, she finds Toraya and Riza together. Riza tries to convince her that sex with Toraya was only practice for the real thing with her, but Sexilia is distraught. The knowledge of Riza's infidelity drives Sexilia to her psychoanalyst. Under therapy, Sexilia discovers that Toraya was responsible for both her childhood traumas and her nymphomania in the same incident that made Riza gay. Rejected by her father, she had had sex with a group of boys on the beach, while Riza looked on. Sexilia meets up with Queti, who after plastic surgery has taken her place. Queti persuades Sexilia to give Riza another chance.

Sadec, who has a highly developed sense of smell and has fallen head over heels in love with Riza, is looking for him everywhere. Sadec's roommates, Islamic extremists, plan to kidnap Riza. Queti warns Sexilia and Riza of the danger and, when Toraya and the Islamic extremists arrive at the airport, Riza and Sexilia are already on the plane bound for Contadora, a tropical island. Back in Madrid, Queti, now Sexilia's look-alike, sleeps with the latter's father, whom she has always fancied; he, believing her to be Sexilia, achieves his aim of truly loving his daughter. At the airport Sadec and his companions, having lost Riza, kidnap Toraya. On the airplane Riza and Sexilia make love for the first time.

== Cast ==
- Cecilia Roth as Sexilia
- Imanol Arias as Riza Niro
- Helga Liné as Toraya
- Marta Fernández Muro as Queti
- Fernando Vivanco as Doctor de la Peña
- Ofelia Angélica as Susana
- Ángel Álcazar as Eusebio
- Concha Grégori as Angustias
- Cristina S. Pascual as Eusebio's girlfriend
- Fany McNamara as Fabio
- Antonio Banderas as Sadec
- Luis Ciges as Queti's father
- Agustín Almodóvar as Hassan
- Santiago Auserón as Angel

== Reception ==
Labyrinth of Passion had its premiere on 25 September 1982 at the San Sebastián International Film Festival. Produced by Alphaville, a distribution company which from 1979 had four cinemas in central Madrid dedicated to the screening of independent films, Labyrinth of Passion enjoyed a much larger budget, more sophisticated technical resources and more lavish publicity than its predecessor Pepi, Luci, Bom (1980). However, critically, the film fared poorly, much worse than Pepi, Luci, Bom.

"Positively bristles with vibrant colors and a wildly comic sexual energy", wrote Marsha Kinder in Film Comment. Nevertheless, critical reaction was generally negative. Writing in El Periodico, J. L. Guarner suggested that: "The story is nothing more than a series of episodes, summarily linked, and what we have come to call cinema plays little part in it. The bizarre plot does not live up to its promise, for its weakened by parallel subplots which weave in and out of it more or less haphazardly."

Almodóvar said about Labyrinth of Passion: "I like the film even if it could have been better made. The main problem is that the story of the two leads is much less interesting than the stories of all the secondary characters. But precisely because there are so many secondary characters, there's a lot in the film I like." On the review aggregator website Rotten Tomatoes, 92% of 12 critics' reviews are positive.

== Analysis ==
Almodóvar has cited Billy Wilder as an influence and has described the film as a "wild comedy, with lots of action and lots of characters... but without Billy Wilder's bite, because this is a very pop film." In the context of pop, he has also referred to the work of Richard Lester, of A Hard Day's Night fame: "Films set in the city where every thing is very banal: girls and boys fall in love a lot, suffer a lot, but their suffering never involves real pain". Thirdly, he was influenced by the romantic melodramas of the 1950s, of which the film series Sissi the Empress was a prime example. The film was particularly inspired by the Shah of Iran, who at the time was still living. Almodóvar imagined the son of the Shah coming to Madrid and used another key figure in the gossip columns, Princess Soraya, who became Toraya in the film. Through them, the director explains: "I wanted to tell the story of a couple that has difficulties developing their relationship. These difficulties stem from the fact that the man and the woman share the same sexual behavior." Almodóvar has also suggested that in making Labyrinth of Passion he experienced: "The difficulty of presenting a relationship in a light hearted way when beneath the surface, there lies a certain sadness."

Making a massive technical improvement on Almodóvar's first feature, Labyrinth of Passion set the tone and style for the films that established his name. A gallery of colorful characters engages in an amusingly complex plot, which concludes with a taxi-cab race to the airport (reworked in 1988's Women on the Verge of a Nervous Breakdown). A fresh-faced Antonio Banderas (who starred in a number of Almodóvar's subsequent films) made here his film debut as a gay terrorist, gifted with a hyper sense of smell that he uses it to track down a Prince with whom he has fallen in love. The film is also notable for Almodóvar's appearance in full drag as a nightclub compeer. The director also plays himself at the beginning of the film in a short scene in which he directs a young transvestite junkie to butcher himself with a drill for a photo strip entitled Photo Porno Sexy Fever.

Writing the script, Almodóvar's idea was to present Madrid as the world's most important city, a city everyone came to and where anything could happen. One draft of the script had Dalí and the Pope meeting and falling passionately in love. That story was eventually cut, but it summed up the general idea.

Labyrinth of Passion was made during the golden age of La Movida Madrileña, between 1977 and 1983, and almost all the key figures of the movement—painters, musicians—are part of the large cast. Depicting the hedonism of underground music venues and gay cruising grounds, the daring script shows Almodóvar's enthusiastic embrace of Spain's newfound freedom of expression. For this reason, the film retains an emblematic power in Spain. It ran for ten years on a midnight run at Madrid's Alphaville cinema, but was released in the United States, England, France and Italy only after the success of Women on the Verge of a Nervous Breakdown.

== DVD release ==
Labyrinth of Passion is available on Region 2 DVD in Spanish with English subtitles.
