= Goya Award for Best Supporting Actress =

Annual award by the Spanish Film Academy

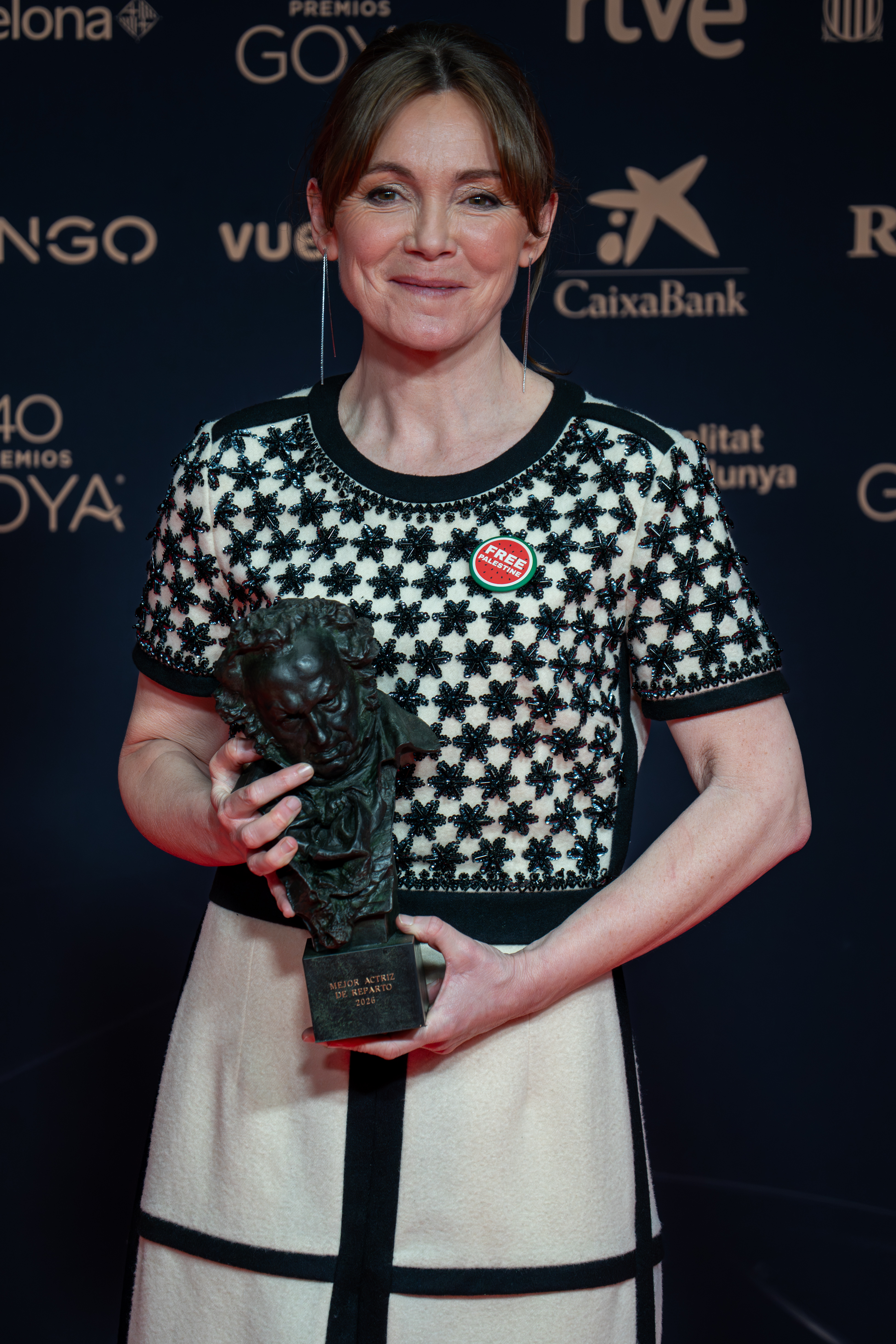
- The 2026 recipient: Nagore Aranburu
- Native name: Premio Goya a la mejor interpretación femenina de reparto
- Awarded for: Best performance by an actress in a supporting role in a Spanish film of the year
- Country: Spain
- Presented by: Academy of Cinematographic Arts and Sciences of Spain (AACCE)
- First award: 1st Goya Awards (1986)
- Most recent winner: Nagore Aranburu; Sundays (2025)
- Website: Official website

The Goya Award for Best Supporting Actress (Spanish: Premio Goya a la mejor interpretación femenina de reparto) is one of the Goya Awards presented annually by the Academy of Cinematographic Arts and Sciences of Spain (AACCE) since the awards debuted in 1986. It is given in honor of an actress who has delivered an outstanding supporting performance in a Spanish film.

== History ==
Since its inception, the award has been given to 31 actresses. At the 1st Goya Awards ceremony held in 1987, Verónica Forqué was the first winner of this award for her role in Year of Enlightment.

Verónica Forqué, Rosa Maria Sardà, María Barranco and Candela Peña have received the most awards in this category with two awards each. Chus Lampreave and Terele Pávez have been nominated on six occasions with each winning one award, being the most nominated actresses in the category. María Barranco and Candela Peña follow with five nominations each.

Actresses that won or were nominated for this category have appeared in film festivals such as the Málaga Film Festival, where Elvira Mínguez (Tapas) and Susi Sánchez (Lullaby) won Best Actress while Nathalie Poza (Rosa's Wedding) won the Best Supporting Actress. At the Cannes Film Festival, Carmen Maura, Lola Dueñas and Blanca Portillo won the Best Actress award alongside the female cast of Volver (2006).

As of the 2026 ceremony, Nagore Aranburu is the most recent winner in this category for her role as Madre Priora Isabel in Sundays.

== Winners and nominees ==
In the following table, the years are listed as per Academy convention, and generally correspond to the year of film release; the ceremonies are always held the following year.

Table key
‡	Indicates the winner

=== 1980s ===
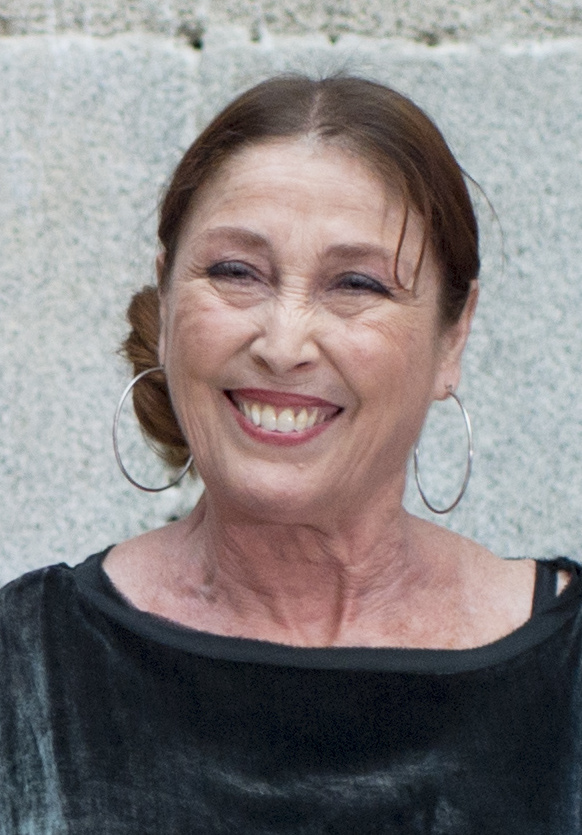
Verónica Forqué was the first winner in this category for her performance in Year of Enlightment (1986)

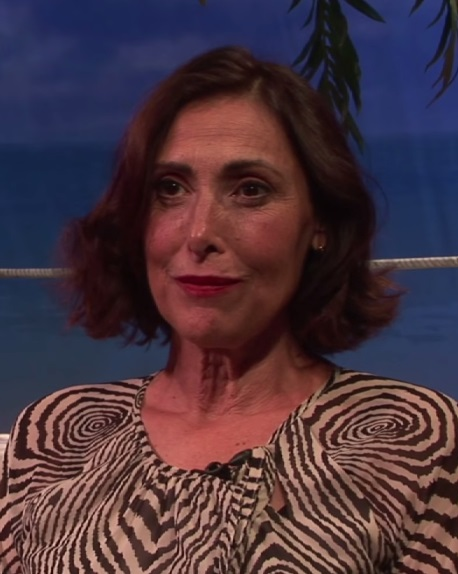
María Barranco won twice for her roles in Women on the Verge of a Nervous Breakdown (1988) and The Ages of Lulu (1990)

Year	Actress	Role(s)	English title	Original title
1986 (1st)	Verónica Forqué ‡	Irene	Year of Enlightment	El año de las luces
1986 (1st)	María Luisa Ponte	Alejandra	The Bastard Brother of God	El hermano bastardo de Dios
1986 (1st)	Chus Lampreave	Doña Tránsito	Year of Enlightment	El año de las luces
1987 (2nd)	Verónica Forqué ‡	Monique	Moors and Christians	Moros y cristianos
1987 (2nd)	Marisa Paredes	Olga	Turnip Top	Cara de acelga
1987 (2nd)	Terele Pávez	Teresa	Laura	Laura, del cielo llega la noche
1988 (3rd)	María Barranco ‡	Candela	Women on the Verge of a Nervous Breakdown	Mujeres al borde de un ataque de nervios
1988 (3rd)	Laura Cepeda	Policía	Baton Rouge	
1988 (3rd)	Chus Lampreave	Emilia	Wait for Me in Heaven	Espérame en el cielo
1988 (3rd)	Terele Pávez	Madre	Winter Diary	Diario de invierno
1988 (3rd)	Julieta Serrano	Lucía	Women on the Verge of a Nervous Breakdown	Mujeres al borde de un ataque de nervios
1989 (4th)	María Asquerino ‡	Marcela	The Sea and the Weather	El mar y el tiempo
1989 (4th)	María Barranco	Nena Colman	The Things of Love	Las cosas del querer
1989 (4th)	Chus Lampreave	Doña Antonia	Going South Shopping	Bajarse al moro
1989 (4th)	Amparo Rivelles	Isabel de Farnesio	Esquilache	
1989 (4th)	Concha Velasco	Pastora Patermo	Esquilache	

=== 1990s ===
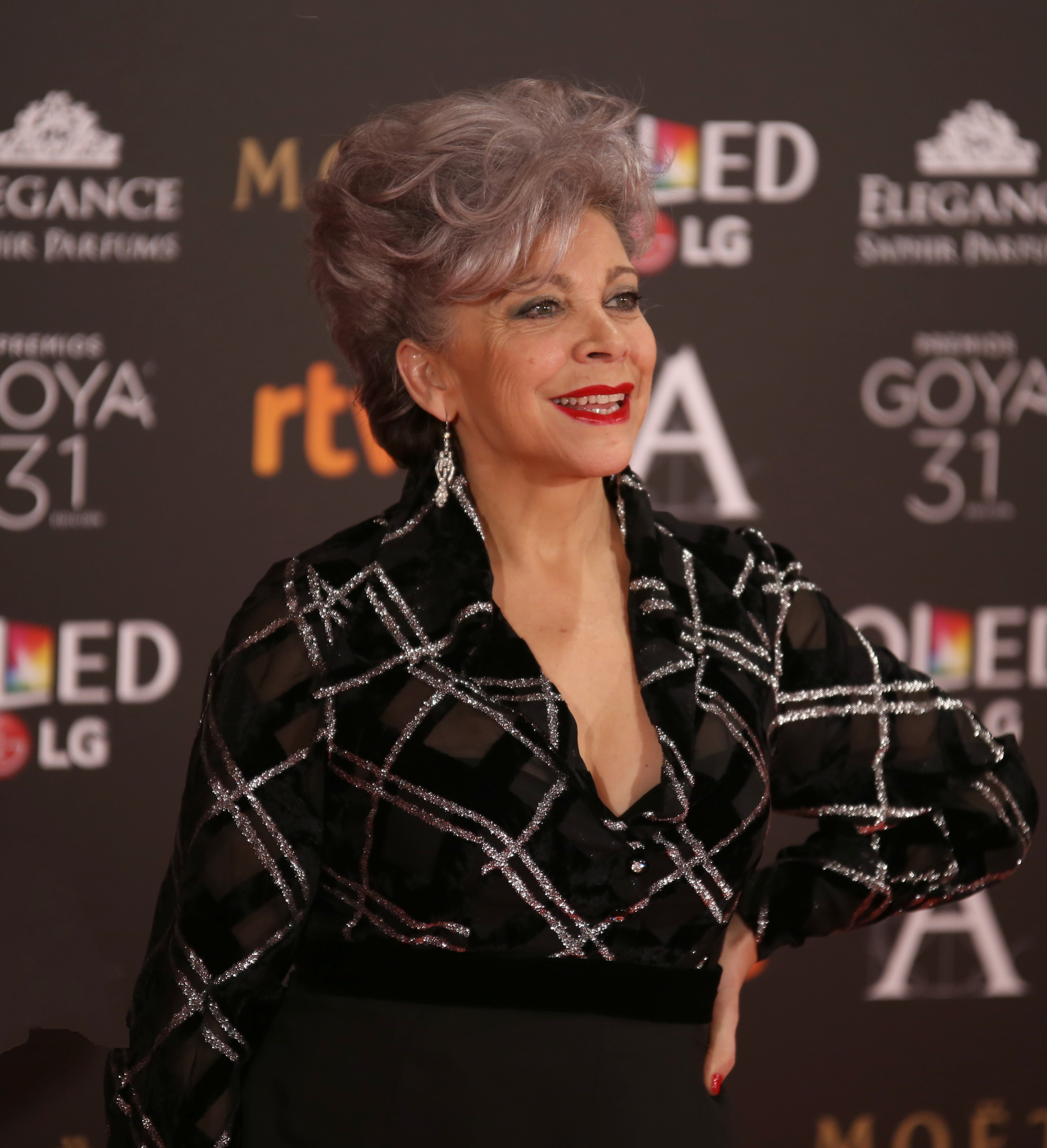
Kiti Manver won for Anything for Bread in 1991.

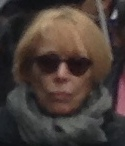
Rosa Maria Sardà won twice for her roles in Why Do They Call It Love When They Mean Sex? (1993) and No Shame (2001)

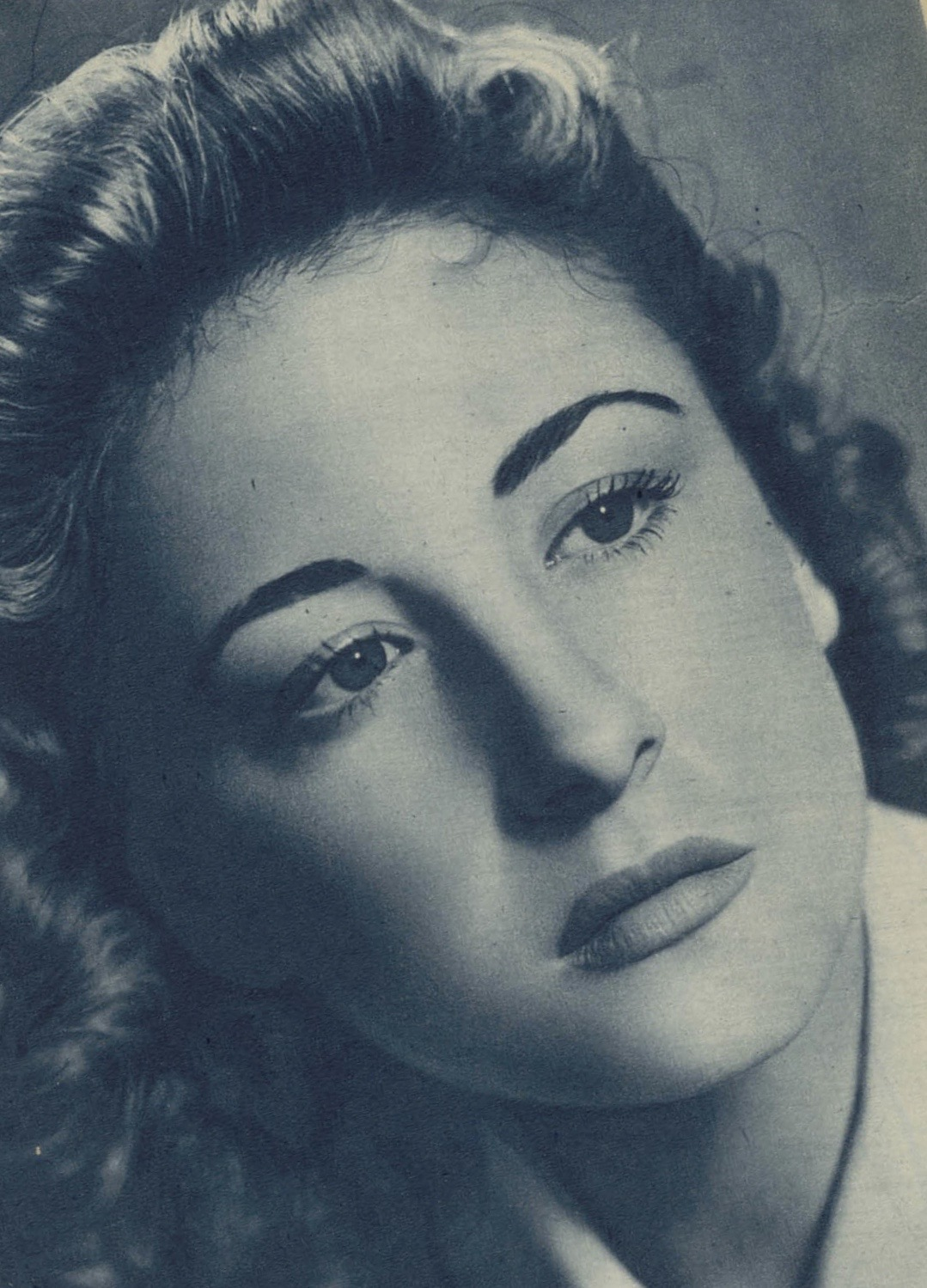
At age 77, Mary Carrillo became the oldest winner in this category for her performance in Beyond the Garden (1996)

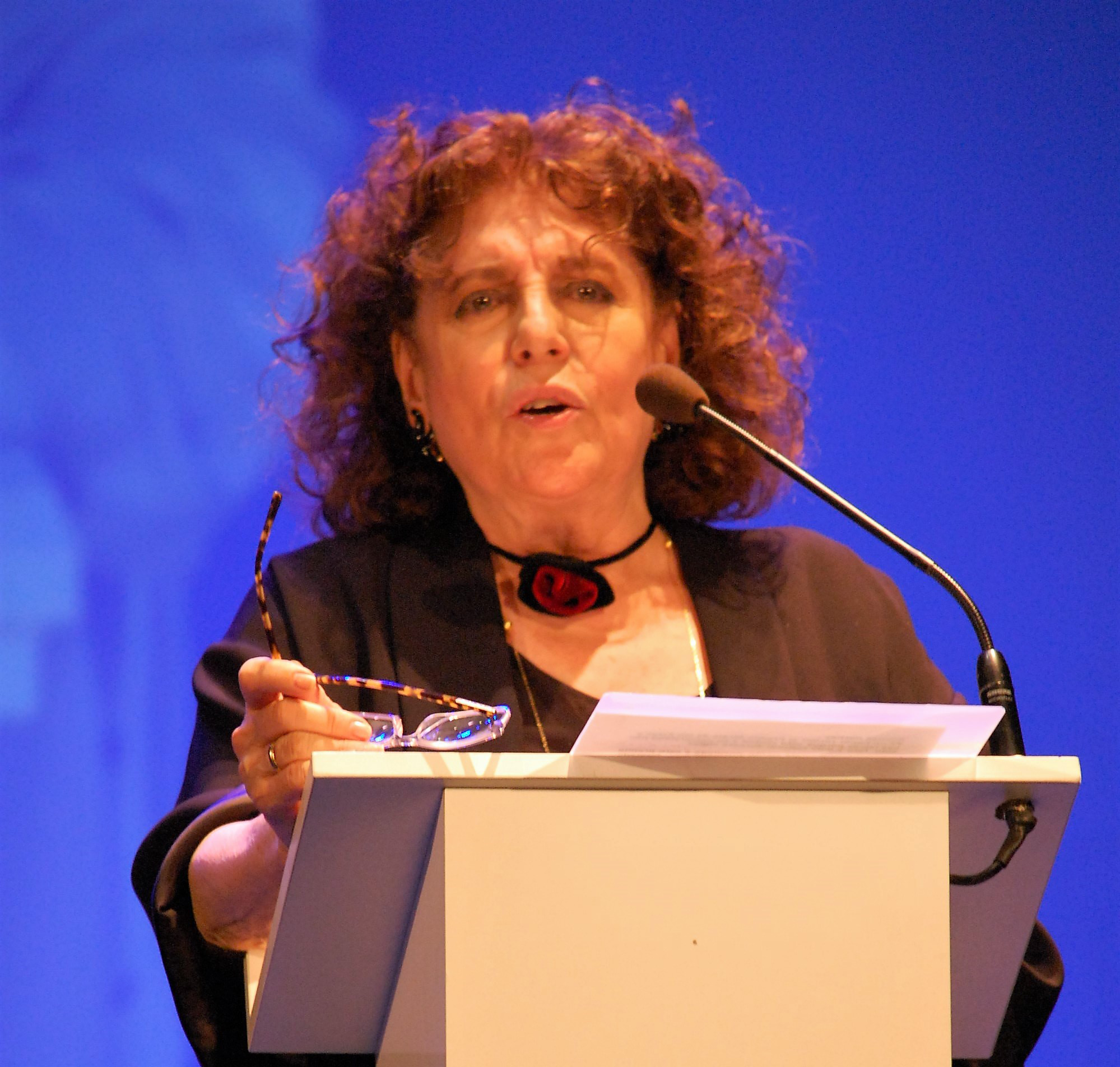
Charo López won for Secrets of the Heart in 1997.

Year	Actress	Role(s)	English title	Original title
1990 (5th)	María Barranco ‡	Ely	The Ages of Lulu	Las edades de Lulú
1990 (5th)	Rosario Flores	Rosario	Against the Wind	Contra el viento
1990 (5th)	Loles León	Lola Osorio	Tie Me Up! Tie Me Down!	¡Átame!
1991 (6th)	Kiti Manver ‡	Verónica	Anything for Bread	Todo por la pasta
1991 (6th)	María Barranco	Lucrecia	The Dumbfounded King	El rey pasmado
1991 (6th)	Cristina Marcos	Paula	High Heels	Tacones lejanos
1992 (7th)	Chus Lampreave ‡	Doña Asun	Belle Époque	
1992 (7th)	Pastora Vega	Charo	Too Much Heart	Demasiado corazón
1992 (7th)	Mary Carmen Ramírez	Amalia	Belle Époque	
1993 (8th)	Rosa Maria Sardà ‡	Sole	Why Do They Call It Love When They Mean Sex?	¿Por qué lo llaman amor cuando quieren decir sexo?
1993 (8th)	María Barranco	Carmen	The Red Squirrel	La ardilla roja
1993 (8th)	Rossy de Palma	Juana	Kika	
1994 (9th)	María Luisa Ponte ‡	Madre Tornera	Cradle Song	Canción de cuna
1994 (9th)	Candela Peña	Vanesa	Running Out of Time	Días contados
1994 (9th)	Sílvia Munt	Laura	The Turkish Passion	La pasión turca
1995 (10th)	Pilar Bardem ‡	Doña Julia	Nobody Will Speak of Us When We're Dead	Nadie hablará de nosotras cuando hayamos muerto
1995 (10th)	Chus Lampreave	Leo's mother	The Flower of My Secret	La flor de mi secreto
1995 (10th)	Rossy de Palma	Rosa	The Flower of My Secret	La flor de mi secreto
1996 (11th)	Mary Carrillo ‡	Ama	Beyond the Garden	Más allá del jardín
1996 (11th)	Maribel Verdú	Areusa	La Celestina	
1996 (11th)	Loles León	Charo	Libertarias	
1997 (12th)	Charo López ‡	María	Secrets of the Heart	Secretos del corazón
1997 (12th)	Ángela Molina	Clara	Live Flesh	Carne trémula
1997 (12th)	Vicky Peña	Rosa	Secrets of the Heart	Secretos del corazón
1998 (13th)	Adriana Ozores ‡	Flora	A Time for Defiance	La hora de los valientes
1998 (13th)	Alicia Sánchez	Carmen	Barrio	Barrio
1998 (13th)	Loles León	Trini Morenos	The Girl of Your Dreams	La niña de tus ojos
1998 (13th)	Rosa Maria Sardà	Rosa Rosales	The Girl of Your Dreams	La niña de tus ojos
1999 (14th)	María Galiana ‡	Rosa	Alone	Solas
1999 (14th)	Adriana Ozores	Ana	By My Side Again	Cuando vuelvas a mi lado
1999 (14th)	Julieta Serrano	Aunt Rafaela	By My Side Again	Cuando vuelvas a mi lado
1999 (14th)	Candela Peña	Nina Cruz	All About My Mother	Todo sobre mi madre

=== 2000s ===
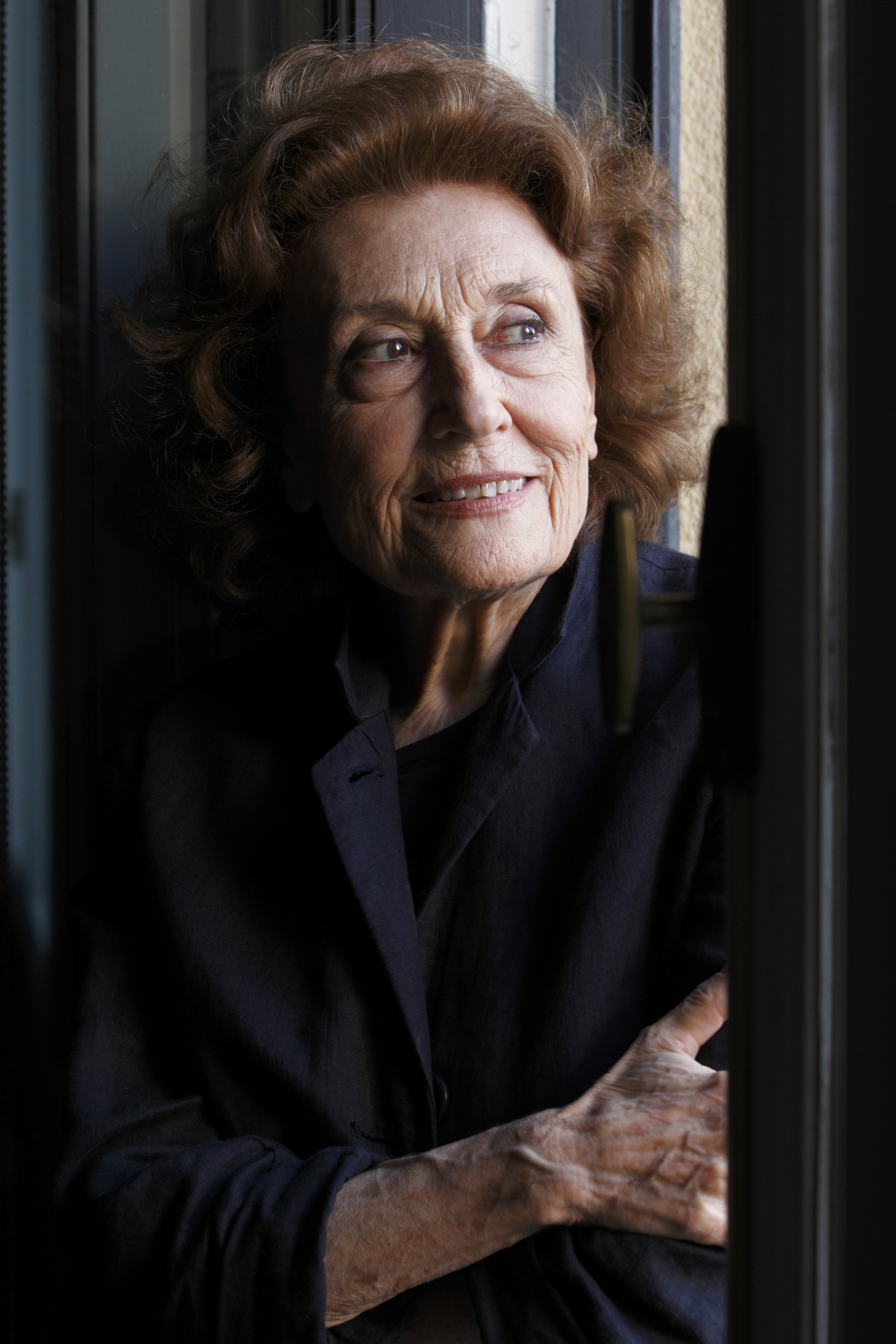
Julia Gutiérrez Caba won for You're the One in 2000.

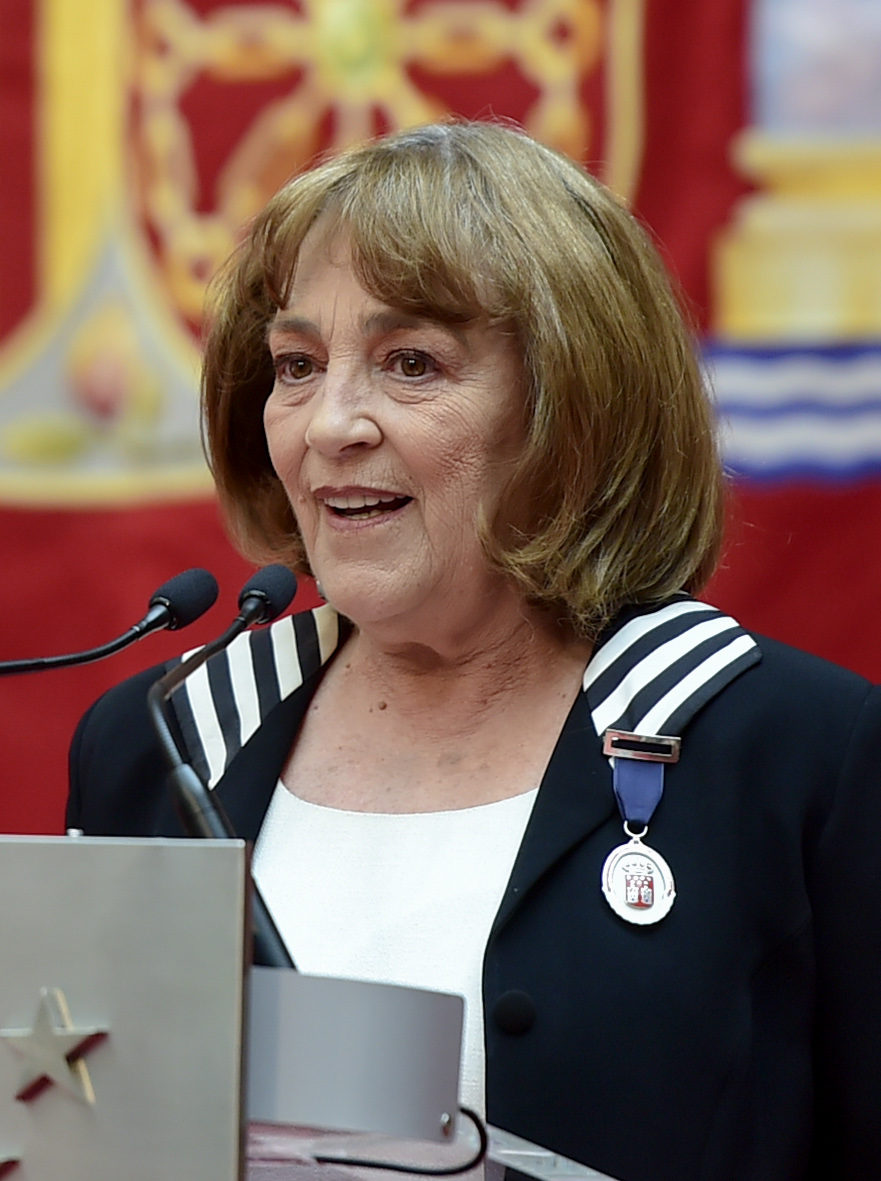
Carmen Maura won for Volver in 2006.

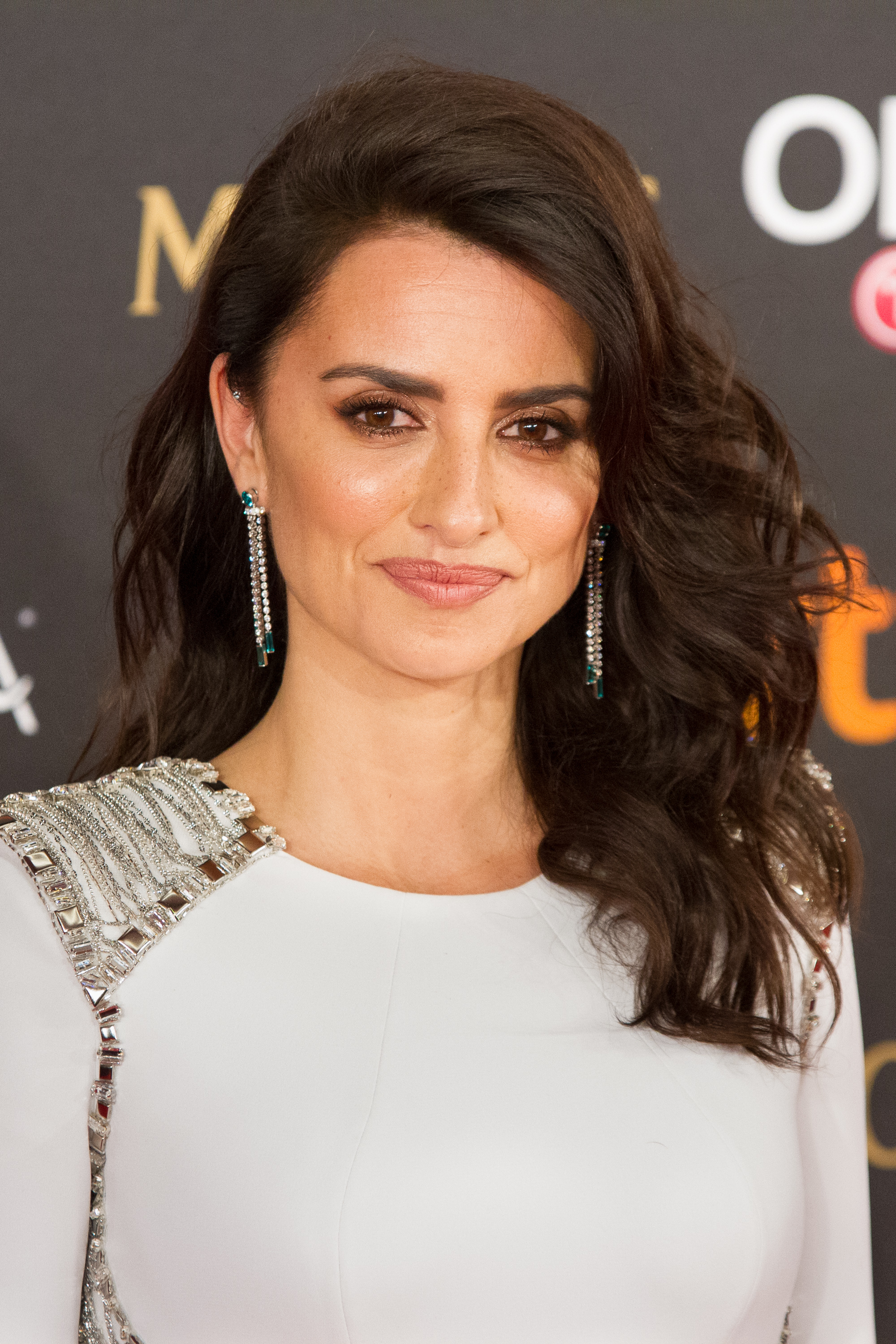
Penélope Cruz is the only actress who has won the Oscar and the Goya for the same role: María Elena in Vicky Cristina Barcelona (2008)

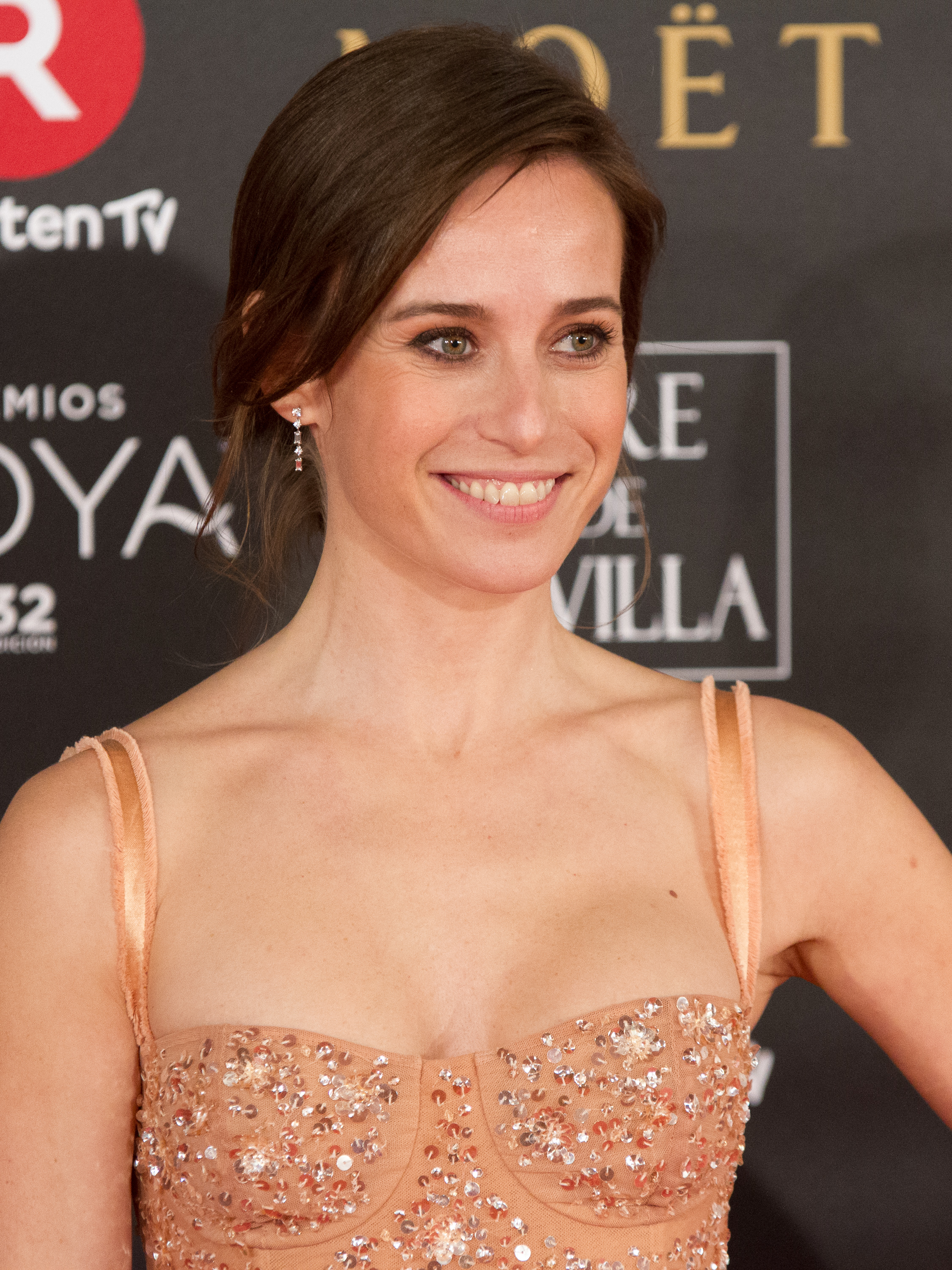
Marta Etura won for Cell 211 in 2009.

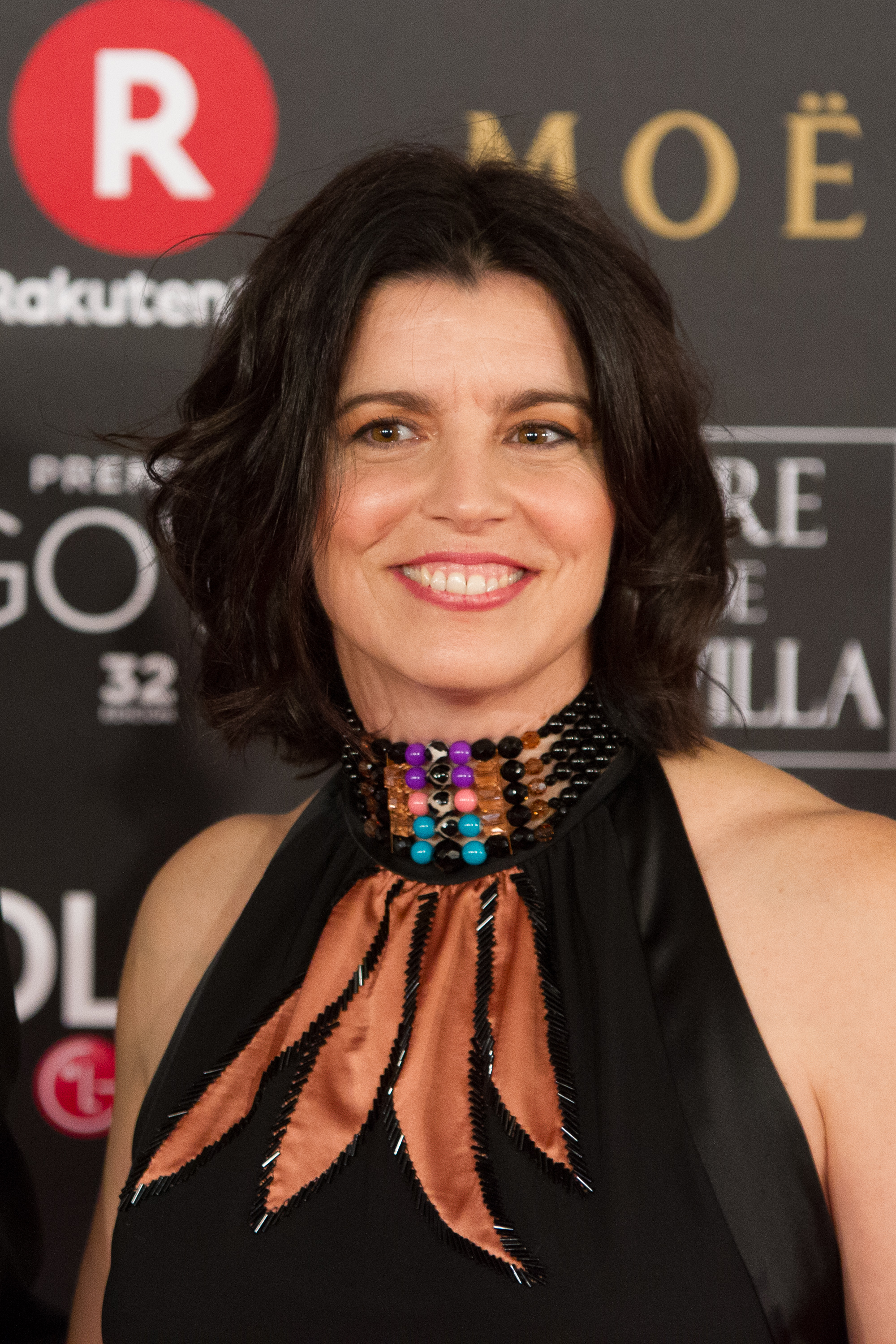
The only performer who has won Goya awards in all three acting categories is Laia Marull, who won best new actress in 2000 for Fugitives, best actress in 2003 for Take My Eyes, and best supporting actress in 2010 for Black Bread

Year	Actress	Role(s)	English title	Original title
2000 (15th)	Julia Gutiérrez Caba ‡	Aunt Gala	You're the One	Una historia de entonces
2000 (15th)	Chusa Barbero	Marian	Kisses for Everyone	Besos para todos
2000 (15th)	Terele Pávez	Ramona	Common Wealth	La comunidad
2000 (15th)	Ana Fernández	Pilara	You're the One	Una historia de entonces
2001 (16th)	Rosa Maria Sardà ‡	Ronda	No Shame	Sin vergüenza
2001 (16th)	Elena Anaya	Belén	Sex and Lucia	Lucía y el sexo
2001 (16th)	Najwa Nimri	Elena	Sex and Lucia	Lucía y el sexo
2001 (16th)	Rosana Pastor	Elvira	Mad Love	Juana la Loca
2002 (17th)	Geraldine Chaplin ‡	Marie	In the City Without Limits	En la ciudad sin límites
2002 (17th)	María Esteve	Pilar	The Other Side of the Bed	El otro lado de la cama
2002 (17th)	Mar Regueras	Natalia	Rancour	Rencor
2002 (17th)	Tina Sainz	Melchora	Story of a Kiss	Historia de un beso
2003 (18th)	Candela Peña ‡	Ana	Take My Eyes	Te doy mis ojos
2003 (18th)	María Botto	Conchi	Soldiers of Salamis	Soldados de Salamina
2003 (18th)	Mónica López	Irene	In the City	En la ciudad
2003 (18th)	María Pujalte	Beatriz	The Carpenter's Pencil	El lápiz del carpintero
2004 (19th)	Mabel Rivera ‡	Manuela	The Sea Inside	Mar adentro
2004 (19th)	Silvia Abascal	Begoña	The Wolf	El lobo
2004 (19th)	Victoria Abril	Luciana	The 7th Day	El 7° día
2004 (19th)	Mercedes Sampietro	Mrs. Mingarro	Unconscious	Inconscientes
2005 (20th)	Elvira Mínguez ‡	Raquel	Tapas	
2005 (20th)	Marta Etura	Clara	Something to Remember Me By	Para que no me olvides
2005 (20th)	Pilar López de Ayala	Maestra	Obaba	
2005 (20th)	Verónica Sánchez	La Chispa	Camarón: When Flamenco Became Legend	Camarón
2006 (21st)	Carmen Maura ‡	Irene Trujillo	Volver	
2006 (21st)	Ariadna Gil	María de Castro	Alatriste	
2006 (21st)	Lola Dueñas	Soledad	Volver	
2006 (21st)	Blanca Portillo	Agustina	Volver	
2007 (22nd)	Amparo Baró ‡	Emilia	Seven Billiard Tables	Siete mesas de billar francés
2007 (22nd)	Geraldine Chaplin	Aurora	The Orphanage	El orfanato
2007 (22nd)	Nuria González	Carmen	Mataharis	
2007 (22nd)	María Vázquez	Inés	Mataharis	
2008 (23rd)	Penélope Cruz ‡	María Elena	Vicky Cristina Barcelona	
2008 (23rd)	Elvira Mínguez	Merche	Cowards	Cobardes
2008 (23rd)	Rosana Pastor	Juana Coello	The El Escorial Conspiracy	La conjura de El Escorial
2008 (23rd)	Tina Sainz	Doña Restituta	Blood of May	Sangre de mayo
2009 (24th)	Marta Etura ‡	Elena	Cell 211	Celda 211
2009 (24th)	Pilar Castro	Pilar	Fat People	Gordos
2009 (24th)	Verónica Sánchez	Paula	Fat People	Gordos
2009 (24th)	Vicky Peña	Doña Luisa	The Consul of Sodom	El cónsul de Sodoma

=== 2010s ===
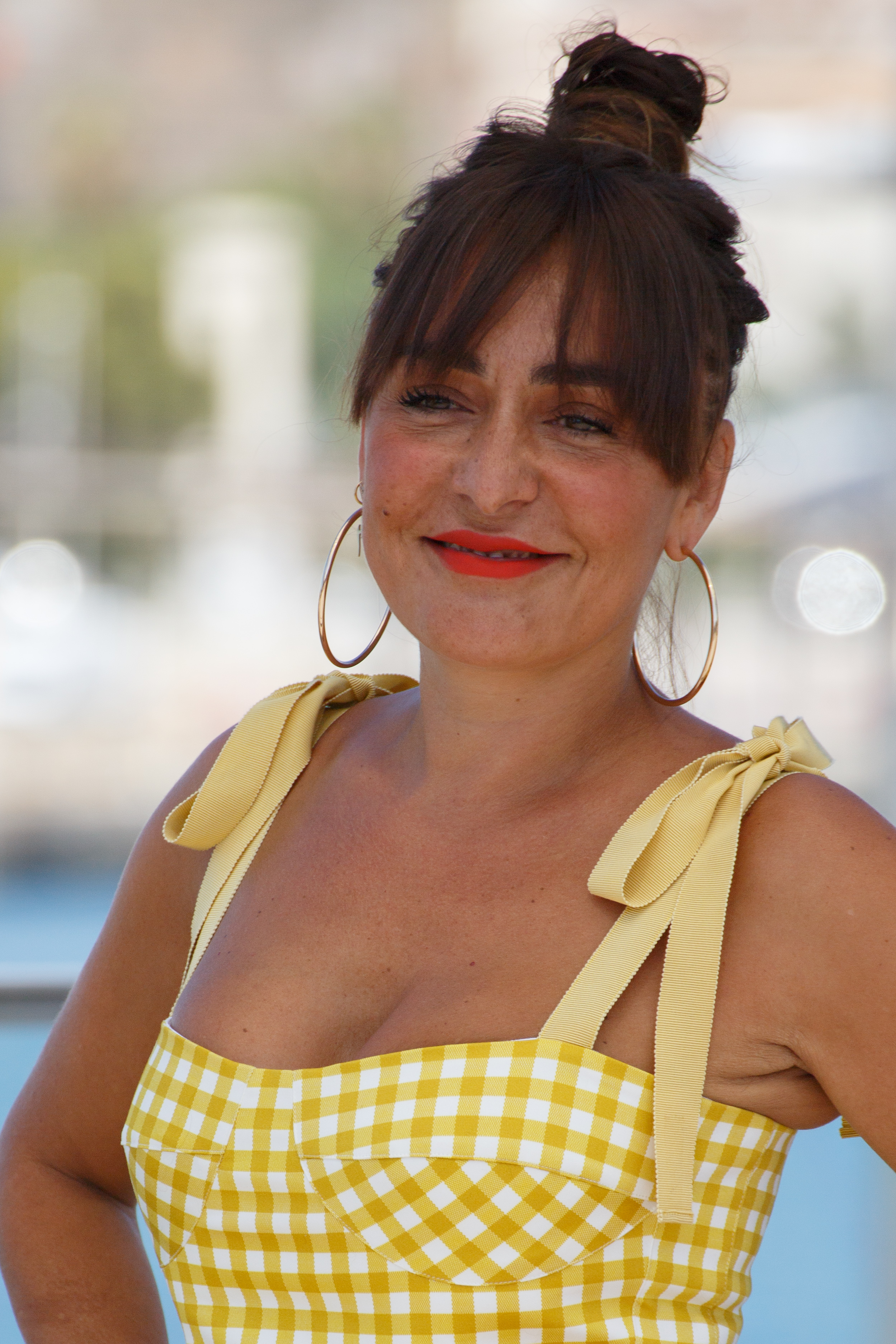
Candela Peña won twice for her roles in Take My Eyes (2003) and A Gun in Each Hand (2012)

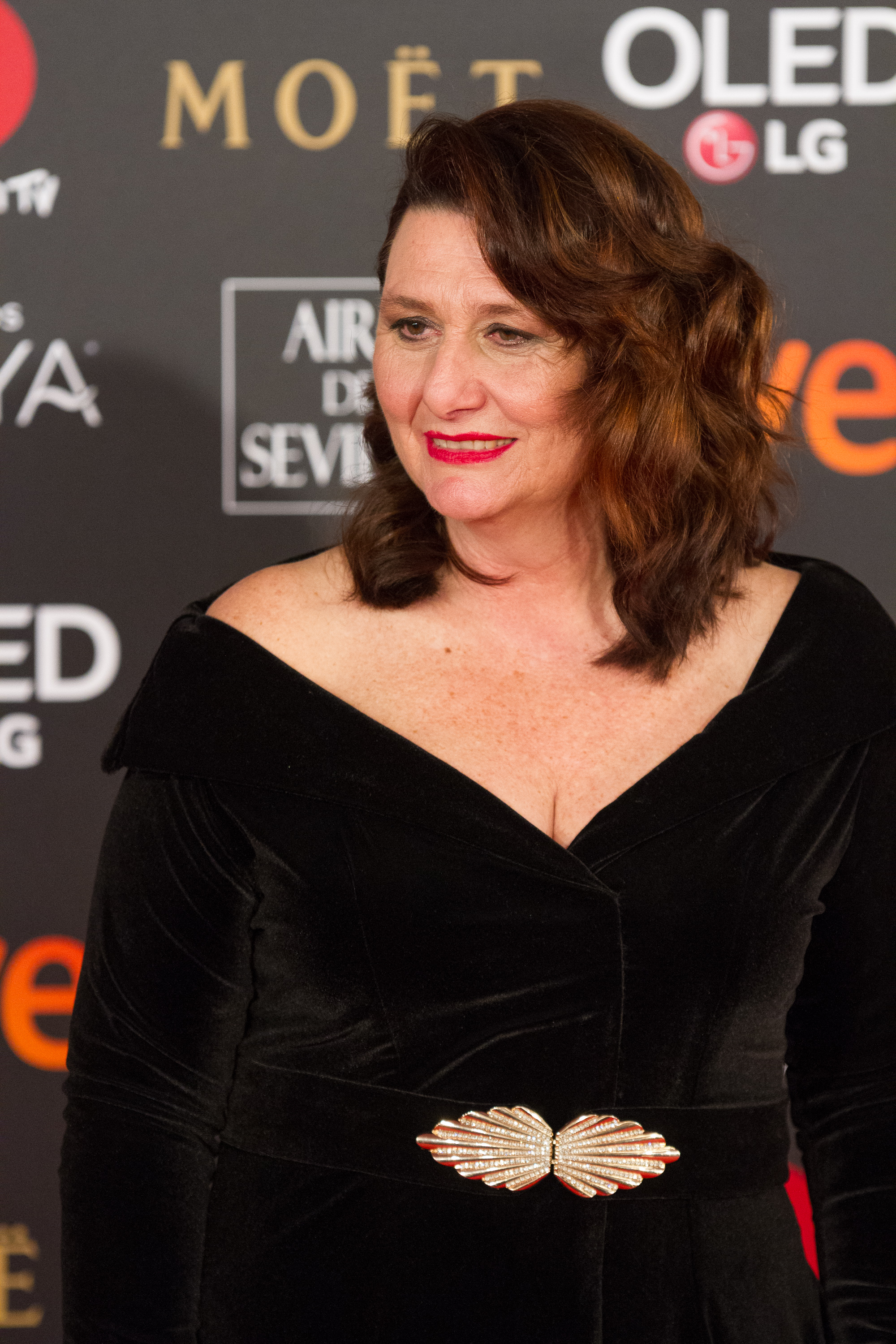
Adelfa Calvo won for The Motive (2017).

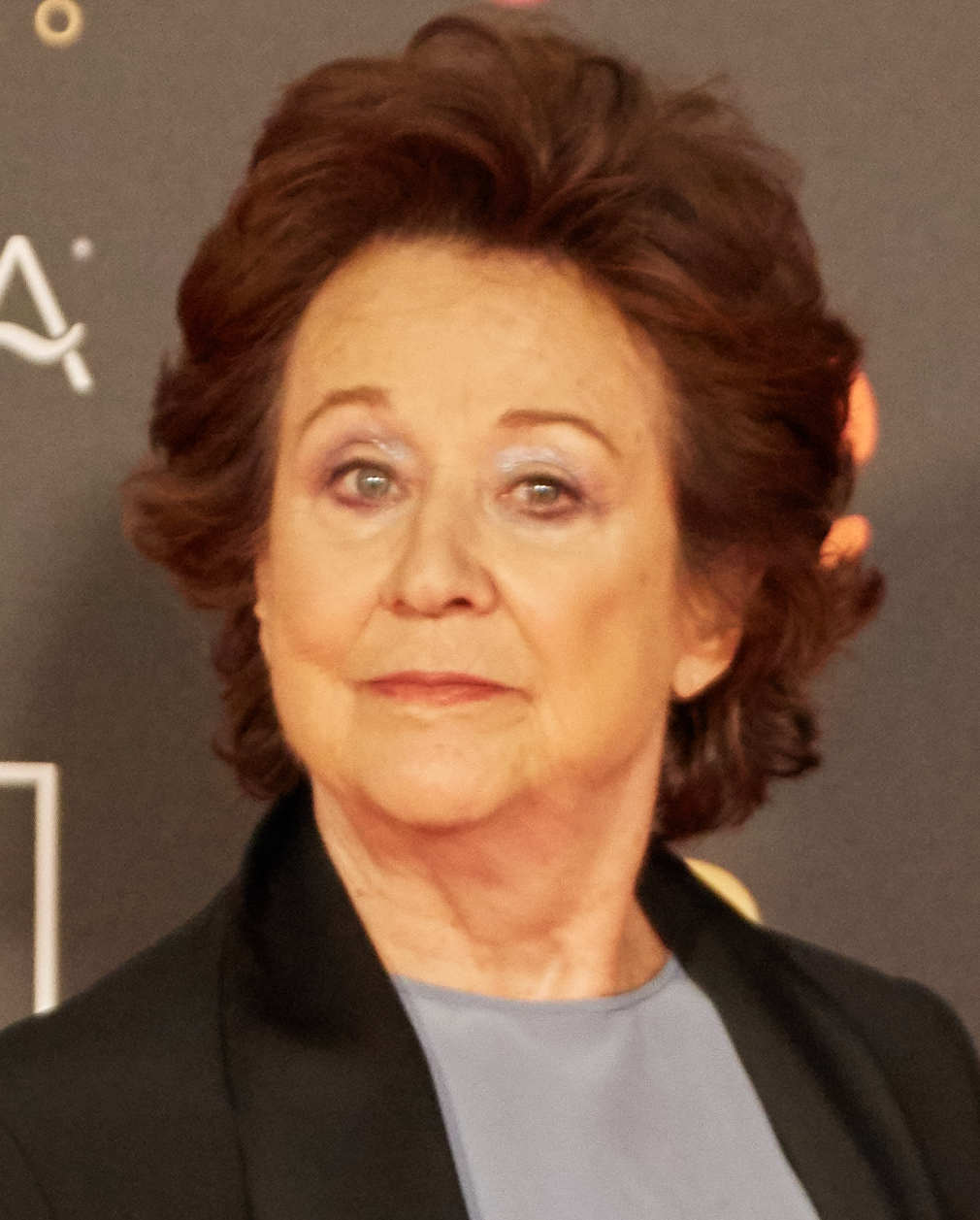
Julieta Serrano won for Pain and Glory (2019).

Year	Actress	Role(s)	English title	Original title
2010 (25th)	Laia Marull ‡	Pauleta	Black Bread	Pa negre
2010 (25th)	Ana Wagener	Bea	Biutiful	
2010 (25th)	Pilar López de Ayala	Elena Osorio	Lope	
2010 (25th)	Terele Pávez	Dolores	The Last Circus	Balada triste de trompeta
2011 (26th)	Ana Wagener ‡	Mercedes	The Sleeping Voice	La voz dormida
2011 (26th)	Pilar López de Ayala	Luisa	Intruders	
2011 (26th)	Goya Toledo	Mari Luz	Maktub	
2011 (26th)	Maribel Verdú	Inés	Chrysalis	De tu ventana a la mía
2012 (27th)	Candela Peña ‡	Mamen	A Gun in Each Hand	Una pistola en cada mano
2012 (27th)	Chus Lampreave	María	The Artist and the Model	El artista y la modelo
2012 (27th)	María León	María	Carmina or Blow Up	Carmina o revienta
2012 (27th)	Ángela Molina	Doña Concha	Blancanieves	
2013 (28th)	Terele Pávez ‡	Maritxu	Witching & Bitching	Las brujas de Zugarramurdi
2013 (28th)	Susi Sánchez	Mother	10,000 Nights Nowhere	10.000 noches en ninguna parte
2013 (28th)	Maribel Verdú	Margo Aguirre	15 Years and One Day	15 años y un día
2013 (28th)	Nathalie Poza	Andrea	All the Women	Todas las mujeres
2014 (29th)	Carmen Machi ‡	Merche / Anne	Spanish Affair	Ocho apellidos vascos
2014 (29th)	Bárbara Lennie	Eva	El Niño	
2014 (29th)	Mercedes León	Mrs. Casa Soto	Marshland	La isla mínima
2014 (29th)	Goya Toledo	Virginia	Marseille	Marsella
2015 (30th)	Luisa Gavasa ‡	Mother	The Bride	La novia
2015 (30th)	Elvira Mínguez	Belén	Retribution	El desconocido
2015 (30th)	Marian Álvarez	Cati Martín	Felices 140	
2015 (30th)	Nora Navas	Martina Ruiz	Felices 140	
2016 (31st)	Emma Suárez ‡	Ana Nieto	The Next Skin	La próxima piel
2016 (31st)	Terele Pávez	Antonia	The Open Door	La puerta abierta
2016 (31st)	Candela Peña	María Candelaria Rodríguez	Kiki, Love to Love	Kiki, el amor se hace
2016 (31st)	Sigourney Weaver	Mrs. Clayton	A Monster Calls	
2017 (32nd)	Adelfa Calvo ‡	Lola	The Motive	El autor
2017 (32nd)	Belén Cuesta	Hermana Milagros	Holy Camp!	La llamada
2017 (32nd)	Anna Castillo	Susana Romero	Holy Camp!	La llamada
2017 (32nd)	Lola Dueñas	Blanca Miralles	Can't Say Goodbye	No sé decir adiós
2018 (33rd)	Carolina Yuste ‡	Paqui	Carmen & Lola	Carmen y Lola
2018 (33rd)	Ana Wagener	Asunción Ceballos	The Realm	El reino
2018 (33rd)	Natalia de Molina	Marta	Quién te cantará	
2018 (33rd)	Anna Castillo	Leonor Hernández	Journey to a Mother's Room	Viaje al cuarto de una madre
2019 (34th)	Julieta Serrano ‡	Jacinta Mallo	Pain and Glory	Dolor y gloria
2019 (34th)	Natalia de Molina	Triana	Bye	Adiós
2019 (34th)	Mona Martínez	María Santos	Bye	Adiós
2019 (34th)	Nathalie Poza	Ana Carrasco	While at War	Mientras dure la guerra

=== 2020s ===
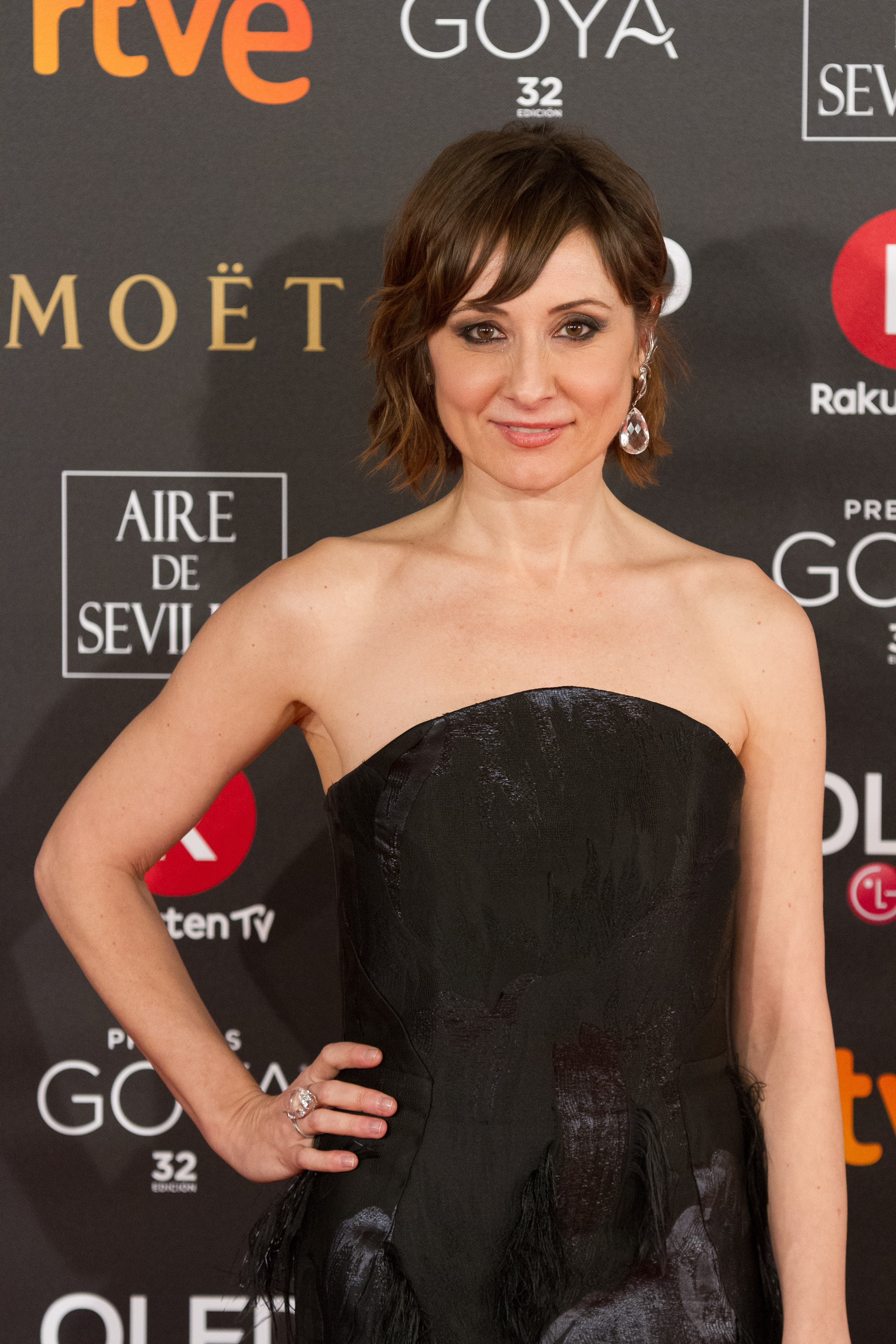
Nathalie Poza won for Rosa's Wedding in 2020.

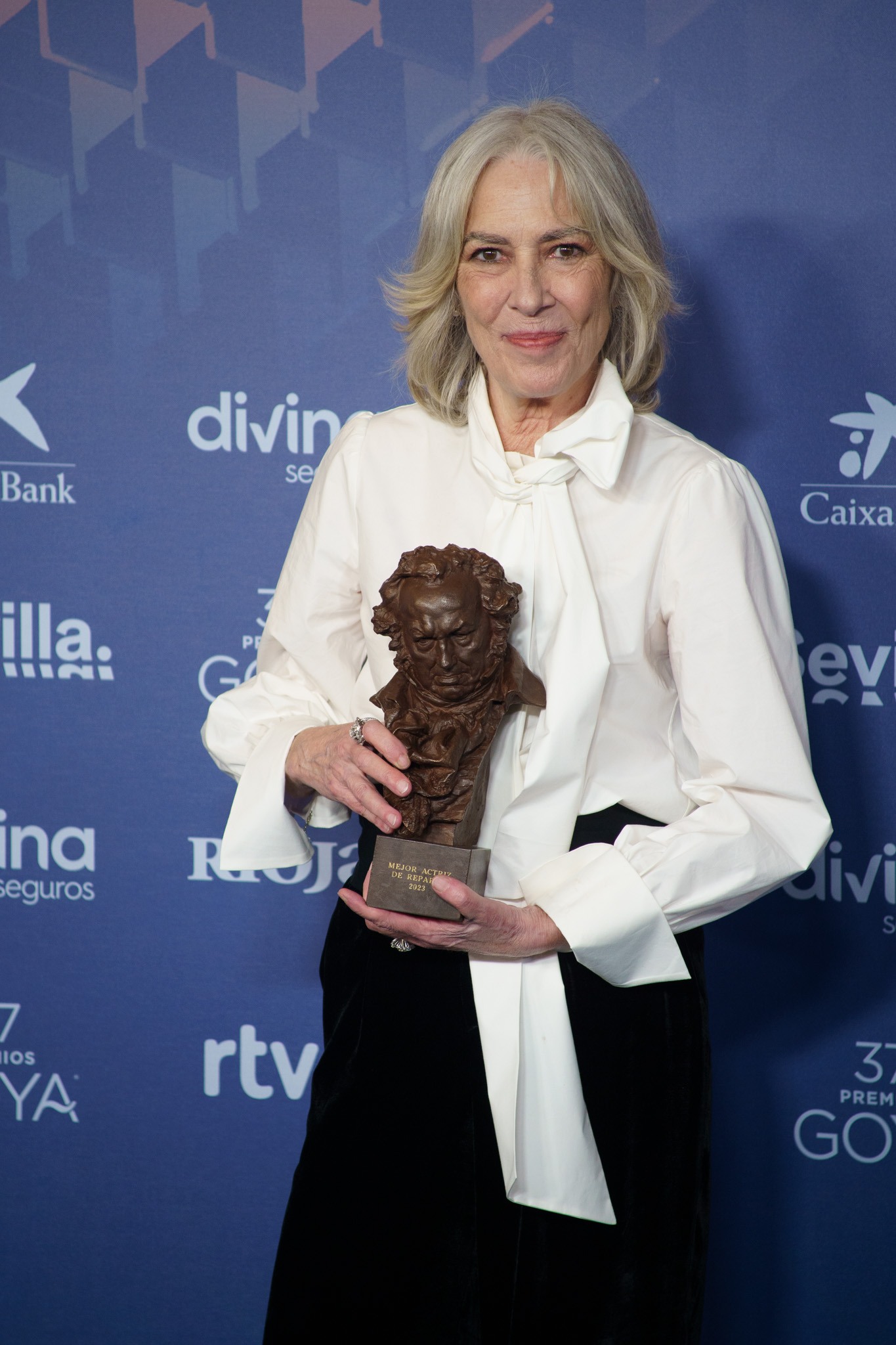
Susi Sánchez won for Lullaby (2022)

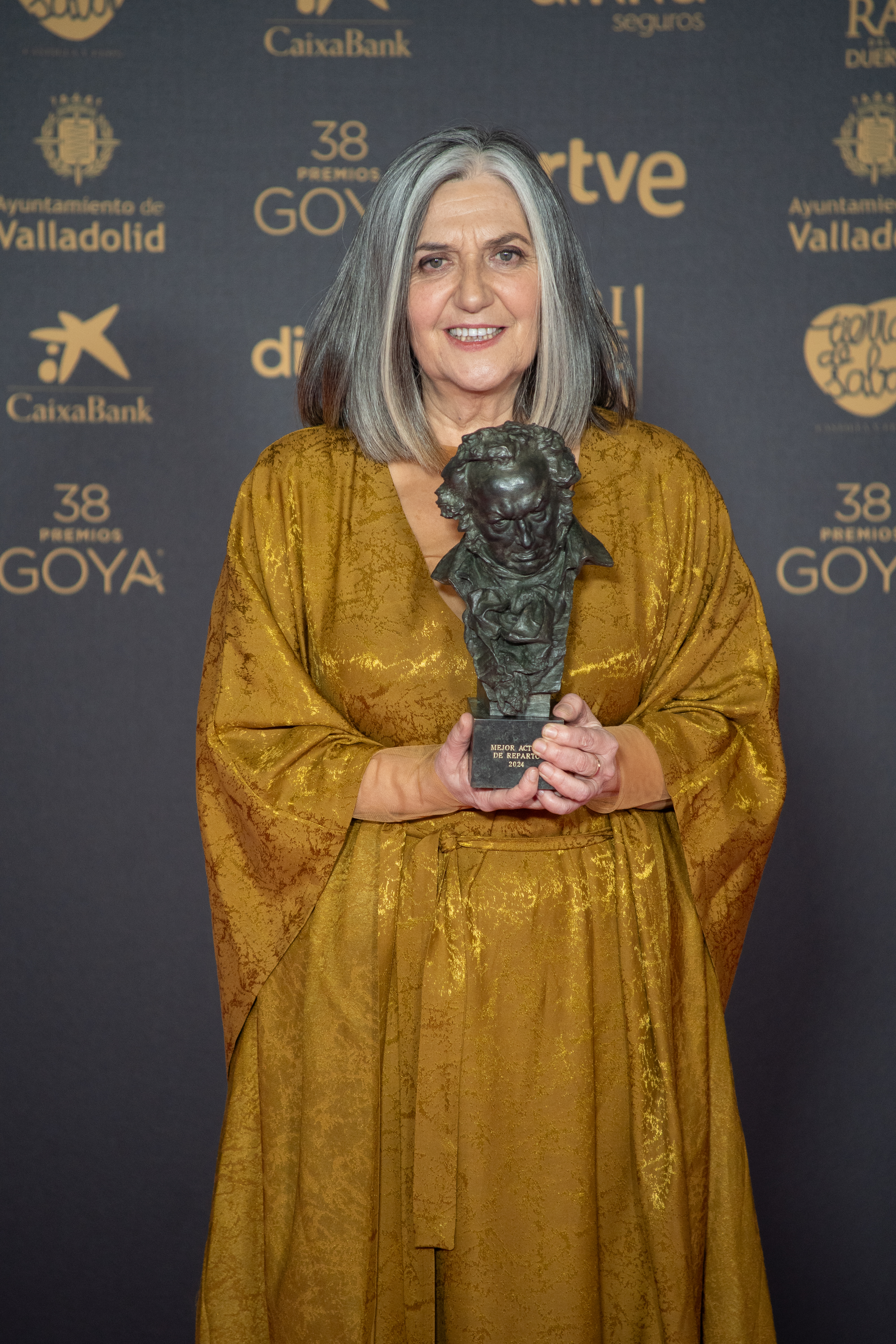
Ane Gabarain won for 20,000 Species of Bees (2023)

Year	Actress	Role(s)	English title	Original title
2020 (35th)	Nathalie Poza	Violeta Román	Rosa's Wedding	La boda de Rosa
2020 (35th)	Juana Acosta	Sara Palacios	One Careful Owner	El inconveniente
2020 (35th)	Verónica Echegui	Amparo	My Heart Goes Boom!	Explota Explota
2020 (35th)	Natalia de Molina	Adela	Schoolgirls	Las niñas
2021 (36th)	Nora Navas	Teresa Vidal	Libertad	
2021 (36th)	Sonia Almarcha	Adela	The Good Boss	El buen patrón
2021 (36th)	Aitana Sánchez-Gijón	Teresa Ferreras	Parallel Mothers	Madres paralelas
2021 (36th)	Milena Smit	Ana Manso Ferreras	Parallel Mothers	Madres paralelas
2022 (37th)	Susi Sánchez	Begoña Arranz	Lullaby	Cinco lobitos
2022 (37th)	Marie Colomb	Marie Denis	The Beasts	As bestas
2022 (37th)	Carmen Machi	Asun	Piggy	Cerdita
2022 (37th)	Penélope Cruz	Azucena	On the Fringe	En los márgenes
2022 (37th)	Ángela Cervantes	Penélope	Motherhood	La maternal
2023 (38th)
2023 (38th)	Ane Gabarain	Lourdes	20,000 Species of Bees	20.000 especies de abejas
2023 (38th)	Ana Torrent	Ana Arenas	Close Your Eyes	Cerrar los ojos
2023 (38th)	Itziar Lazkano	Lita	20,000 Species of Bees	20.000 especies de abejas
2023 (38th)	Luisa Gavasa	Charo	The Teacher Who Promised the Sea	El maestro que prometió el mar
2023 (38th)	Clara Segura	Diana	Creatura	
2024 (39th)	Clara Segura	Carme Vila	The 47	El 47
2024 (39th)	Macarena García	Marta	A House on Fire	Casa en flames
2024 (39th)	Maria Rodríguez Soto	Júlia	A House on Fire	Casa en flames
2024 (39th)	Nausicaa Bonnín	Andrea	Undercover	La infiltrada
2024 (39th)	Aixa Villagrán	Macarena	The Red Virgin	La virgen roja
2025 (40th)	Nagore Aranburu	Madre Priora Isabel	Sundays	Los domingos
2025 (40th)	Elvira Mínguez	Juana	The Dinner	La cena
2025 (40th)	Miryam Gallego	Olalla	Romería	
2025 (40th)	Elena Irureta	Elvira	Deaf	Sorda
2025 (40th)	Maria de Medeiros	Amalia	The Portuguese House	Una quinta portuguesa

== Multiple wins and nominations ==
The following individuals received two Best Supporting Actress awards:

Wins	Actress
2	Verónica Forqué
2	Rosa Maria Sardà
2	María Barranco
2	Candela Peña

The following individuals received three or more Best Supporting Actress nominations:

Nominations	Actress
6	Chus Lampreave
6	Terele Pávez
5	María Barranco
5	Candela Peña
4	Elvira Mínguez
3	Loles León
3	Pilar López de Ayala
3	Maribel Verdú
3	Julieta Serrano
3	Ana Wagener
3	Rosa Maria Sardà
3	Nathalie Poza
3	Natalia de Molina
