= La princesa de Éboli =

Spanish television miniseries

- Genre: Biopic; Historical drama
- Directed by: Belén Macías
- Starring: Belén Rueda; Hugo Silva; Eduard Fernández
- Country of origin: Spain
- Original language: Spanish
- No. of seasons: 1
- No. of episodes: 2

Production
- Production companies: Atresmedia Cine; Notro TV

Original release
- Network: Antena 3
- Release: 18 October – 20 October 2010

La princesa de Éboli (transl. 'The Princess of Eboli') is a two-part Spanish period drama television miniseries about the woman of the same name. Directed by Belén Macías and starring Belén Rueda, Hugo Silva and Eduard Fernández, it originally aired in October 2010 on Antena 3.

== Plot ==
Developed from a "feminist" point of view, the plot concerns the developments on the biography of Ana de Mendoza, Princess of Éboli—a central figure in the Court of Philip II—after she widowed, when she lived a love story with Antonio Pérez, secretary of the king. The fiction delves on the intrigues taking place in the court, including the Pérez's betrayal on the King or the assassination of Juan de Escobedo, that lead to the imprisonment and fall from grace of Ana de Mendoza.

== Cast ==
- Belén Rueda as Ana de Mendoza, Princess of Éboli.
- Hugo Silva as Antonio Pérez.
- Eduard Fernández as King Philip.
- Michelle Jenner as Anna of Austria.
- Pedro Casablanc as Mateo Vázquez, secretary of the King.
- Nathalie Poza as Sofonisba Anguissola.
- Álex Angulo as Núñez de Arce.
- Nuria Mencía as Juana de Coello, wife of Antonio Pérez.
- Roberto Enríquez as Juan de Escobedo.
- Petra Martínez as Bernardina.
- Ferran Rañé as Padre Chaves.

== Production and release ==
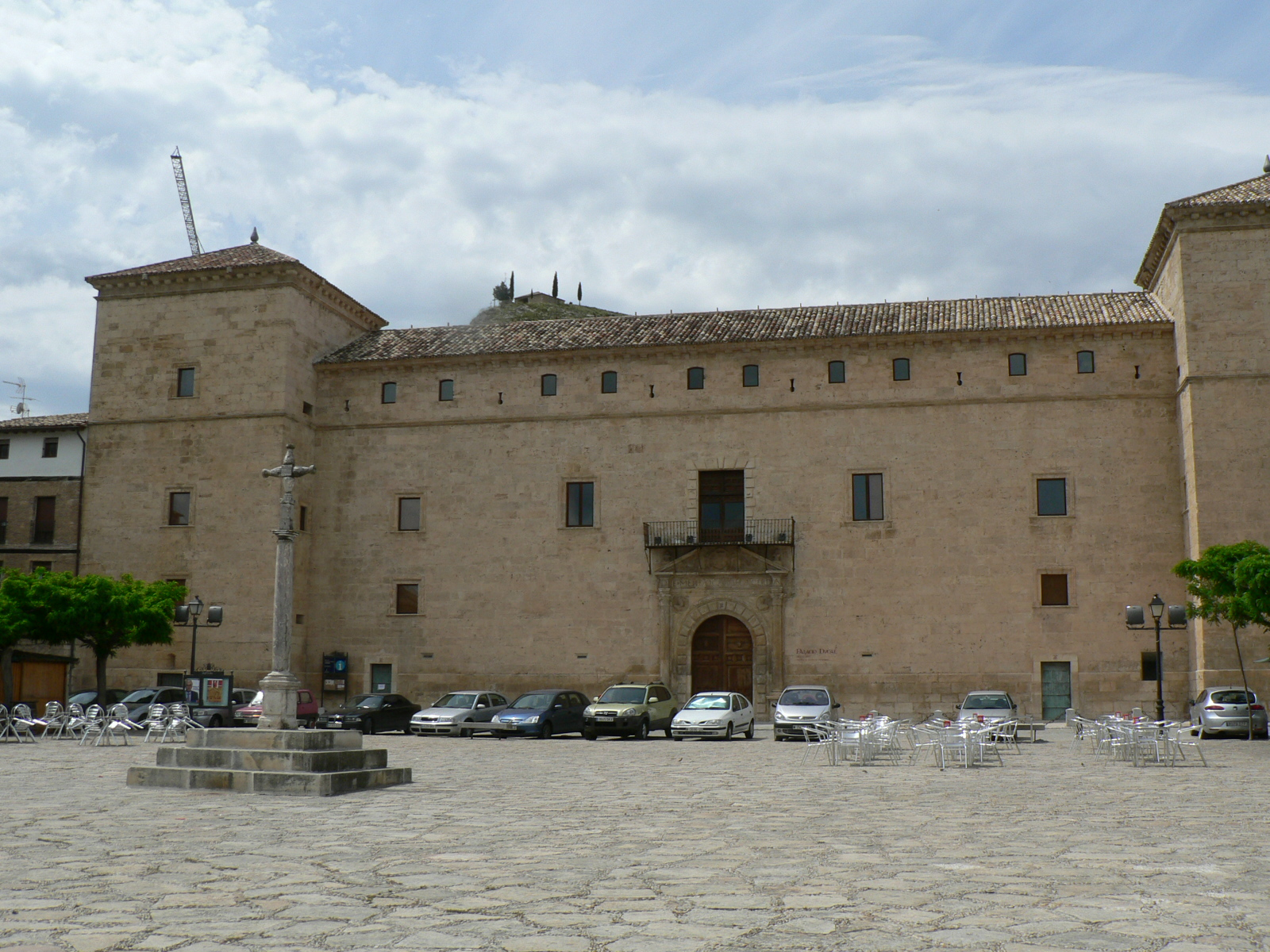
The Ducal Palace in Pastrana was one of the shooting locations

La princesa de Éboli was produced by Atresmedia Cine and Notro Televisión. Filming began by April 2010 and was wrapped by May 2010. Shooting locations included the Ducal Palace of Pastrana; the castle of Mendoza in Manzanares el Real, the Monastery of San Lorenzo de El Escorial and La Granjilla de La Fresneda. Belén Macías directed the miniseries whereas María Jaén worked as screenwriter.

During the film, Belén Rueda wore the eye patch characteristic of her character on her left eye instead of the right eye, which is the one that the Princess of Éboli actually covered.

The miniseries premiered on 18 October 2010, with 2,844,000 viewers and a 16.4% audience share. The finale aired on 20 October 2010, commanding 2,412,000 viewers and a 14.3% share.

Series	Episodes	Originally released		Average viewers	Share (%)	Ref.
Series	Episodes	First released	Last released	Average viewers	Share (%)	Ref.
1	2	18 October 2010	20 October 2010	2,646,000	15.4	

This is a caption
No.	Title	Directed by	Written by	Viewers	Original release date	Share (%)
1	"Primera parte"	Belén Macías	María Jaén	2,844,000	18 October 2010	16.4
2	"Segunda parte"	Belén Macías	María Jaén	2,412,000	20 October 2010	14.3
