= Rosana Pastor =

Spanish politician and actress

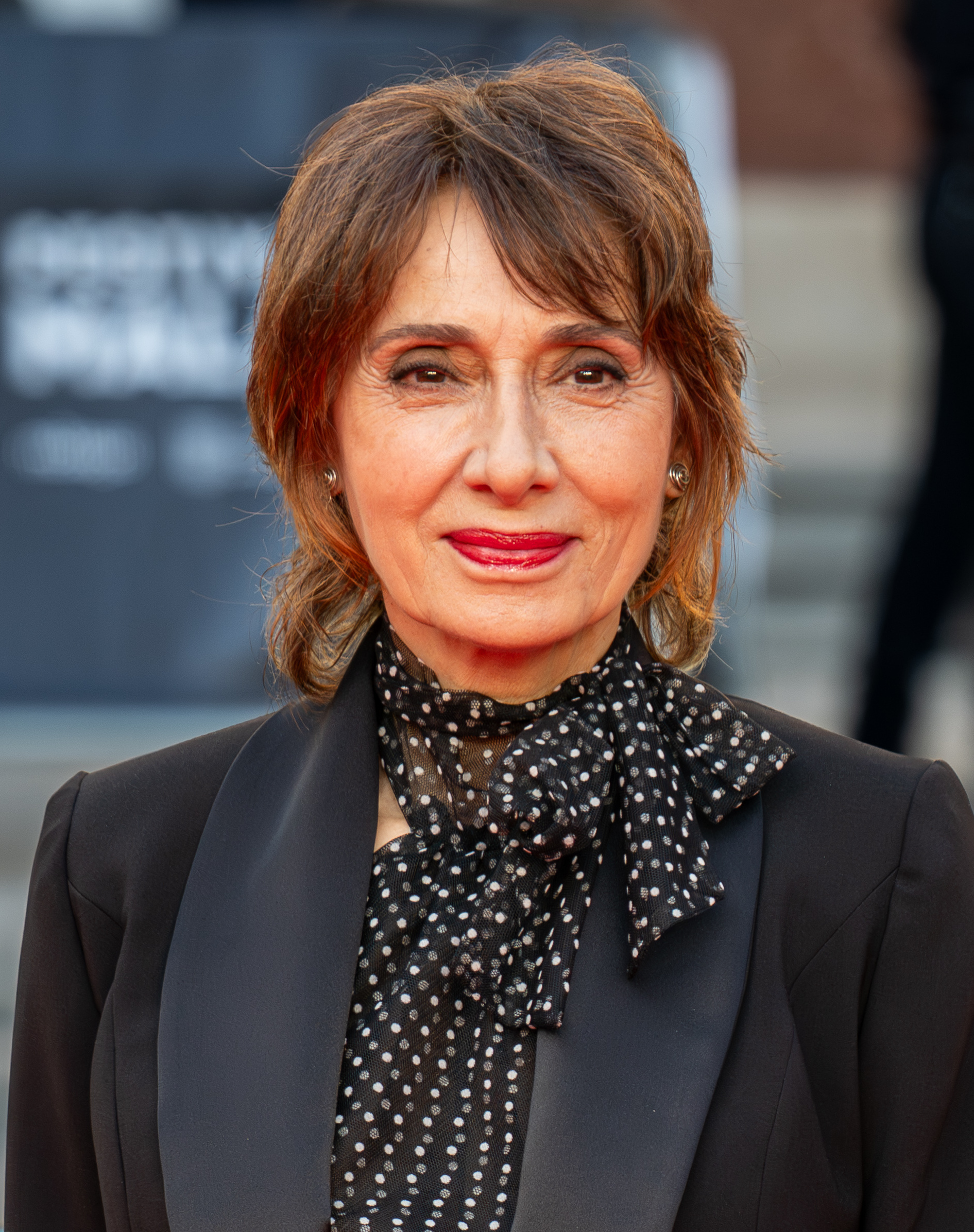
- Pastor in 2026
- Born: Rosana Pastor Muñoz; 7 August 1960 (age 66); Alboraya, Spain
- Occupations: Actress, politician
- Political party: Podemos (2014–Present); Sumar (2023); És el moment (2015–2016); PASOC (1979–2001); United Left (1986–2001); PSOE (1978–1979)

Rosana Pastor Muñoz (born 7 August 1960) is a Spanish politician and actress.

== Biography ==
Rosana Pastor was born in Alboraya, province of Valencia, on 7 August 1960.

Pastor studied at the School of Dramatic Art of Valencia (ESAD). She had classes under Antonio Díaz Zamora, Antonio Tordera and Francisco Romá (director of the film Tres en raya). She acted in Ken Loach's 1995 film Land and Freedom, alongside Ian Hart and Icíar Bollaín.

Apart from her extensive career as a film and television actress, she has also worked on stage. She featured in plays such as Pessoa en Persona; Les Troyens; Uncle Vanya; La pell en Flames; and as "Joan of Arc" at the Palau de les Arts, with the Orchestra and choir of the Cor de la Generalitat Valenciana. She directed and narrated the show "Enoch Arden", which integrates the music of Richard Strauss, narration and singing.

She was nominated for Best Supporting Actress at the 2002 Goya Awards for her role as Doña Elvira in Mad Love. She portrayed Doña Juana Coello in The El Escorial Conspiracy.

In November 2015 it was announced that she would run in the Spanish general election of the same year for Spanish left-wing political party Podemos in coalition with the left-wing Valencian nationalist Compromís. In the event, she was one of the elected MPs running for Valencia.

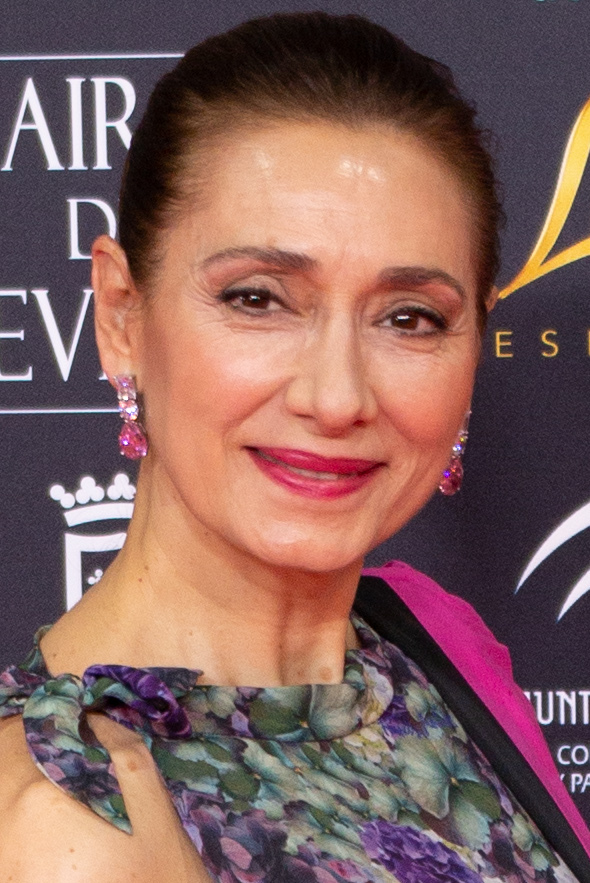
Pastor at the 2020 Goya Awards

== Selected filmography ==
- Las edades de Lulú (1990)
- Land and Freedom (1995)
- The Commissioner (1998)
- Leo (2000)
- Mad Love (2001)
- The Emperor's Wife (2003)
- La conjura de El Escorial (2008)
- Wounded (2013)
- The Black Land (2025)

== Accolades ==
Year	Award	Category	Work	Result	Ref.
1996	10th Goya Awards	Best New Actress	Land and Freedom	Won	
2002	16th Goya Awards	Best Supporting Actress	Mad Love	Nominated	
2009	23rd Goya Awards	Best Supporting Actress	The El Escorial Conspiracy	Nominated	
