= That Lady =

- 1955 Theatrical poster
- Directed by: Terence Young
- Screenplay by: Sy Bartlett
- Based on: That Lady by Kate O'Brien
- Produced by: Sy Bartlett
- Starring: Olivia de Havilland; Gilbert Roland; Paul Scofield; Françoise Rosay; Dennis Price
- Cinematography: Robert Krasker
- Edited by: Raymond Poulton
- Music by: John Addison
- Distributed by: 20th Century Fox
- Release date: 11 May 1955
- Running time: 100 minutes
- Countries: United Kingdom; Spain
- Language: English
- Budget: $1 million

That Lady is a 1955 British-Spanish historical romantic drama film directed by Terence Young and produced by Sy Bartlett and Ray Kinnoch. It stars Olivia de Havilland, Gilbert Roland, and Paul Scofield. It was written by Bartlett based on the 1946 historical novel by Kate O'Brien, which was published in North America under the title For One Sweet Grape. Paul Scofield won the BAFTA Award for Most Promising Newcomer to Leading Film Roles at the 9th British Academy Film Awards for his role in the film.

== Plot ==
The film is the story of Ana de Mendoza, a swashbuckling, sword-toting princess. She lost an eye in a duel defending the honour of her king Philip II of Spain. Philip later jilted Ana to marry Mary I, the Queen of England, marrying her off to an aging noble Ruy Gómez de Silva, 1st Prince of Éboli, who died, leaving her a widow. Subsequently, he asks Ana de Mendoza to assist him in tutoring commoner Antonio Perez as his first secretary, but when they fall in love, his popularity starts to drop, helped along by Philip II's jealous minister Mateo Vasquez.

== Cast ==
- Olivia de Havilland as Ana de Mendoza
- Gilbert Roland as Antonio Perez
- Paul Scofield as King Philip II of Spain
- Françoise Rosay as Bernardine
- Dennis Price as Mateo Vasquez
- Anthony Dawson as Don Inigo
- Robert Harris as Cardinal
- Peter Illing as Diego
- José Nieto as Don Juan de Escobedo
- Christopher Lee as Captain
- Ángel Peralta as Rejoneador
- Fernando Sancho as Diego
- Andy Shine as Little Fernando de Silva

== Production ==
Shot in England and on location in Spain, the film features Cinemascope footage of the Spanish countryside and renaissance castles. That Lady was an early directorial effort by Terence Young, who went on to direct three James Bond films: Dr. No, From Russia With Love, and Thunderball. Christopher Lee appears in a minor role as the Captain of the Guard.

Director Terence Young had tried to interest Greta Garbo in starring in this film, without success. Vivien Leigh was interested, but due to her declining health and tuberculosis, it was impossible to insure her. Olivia de Havilland was the third choice for the film.

Much of the film was shot on location in Segovia, Spain.

== Reception ==
The Monthly Film Bulletin wrote: "That Lady not only lacks imagination, but remains tied to its literary origins all through, and sustains a remarkable amount of purposelessness and indecision; from the long early scene between Ana and the King (in which the dialogue is no more than an exchange of chunks of complicated plot detail) a pedestrian narrative note is struck, and a commentator has even to intervene from time to time to explain what exactly is or has been going on. The slowness seems exaggerated by Olivia de Havilland's performance; as the long-suffering Ana, she acts with changeless emphasis in a self-approving vacuum. The rest of the cast is markedly ill at ease, with the exception of Paul Scofield – who, as the film progresses, creates a believable physical image out of the trite situations. The magnificence of the Escorial and other Spanish locations provides impressive but sometimes over-emphatic backgrounds to this lifeless film. Somehow, somewhere, one feels, something went very wrong."

== Other adaptations of the same novel ==
The novel was also produced as a play in 1949, starring Katharine Cornell as Ana, Henry Daniell as Philip II, and Torin Thatcher as Antonio.
