= Escovedo =

Escovedo is a surname. Notable people with the surname include:

- Alejandro Escovedo, Mexican-American singer-songwriter
- Coke Escovedo (1941–1986), American percussionist
- Juan de Escobedo (1530–1578), Spanish politician
- Pete Escovedo (born 1935), Afro-Latin American musician, father of Sheila
- Sheila Escovedo (born 1957), better known as Sheila E, American singer, drummer, and percussionist
