= Diego de Silva y Mendoza =

Spanish noble, poet, politician and writer (1564–1630)

Diego de Silva y Mendoza (in Portuguese, Diogo da Silva e Mendonça) (Madrid, 23 December 1564 – Madrid, 15 June 1630) was a Spanish nobleman of Portuguese descent, and Spanish Viceroy of Portugal between 1619 and 1621. He was also an eminent poet.

== Biography ==
He was the fourth son of Rui Gomes da Silva, Prince of Éboli, one of King Philip II of Spain's main advisers and Ana de Mendoza y La Cerda, a confidante of Queen Isabel de Valois. His father died when he was nine and he was raised by his mother, whose favorite son he was.

As the son of a Portuguese father and a maternal descendant of the House of Mendoza ,one of Spain's great noble houses, Diego was ideally suited to carry out the Duke of Lerma’s plans for the neighboring country, which had to be incorporated into the Spanish Crown after 1580.
Appointed to the Council of Portugal in 1605, he soon rose to its presidency following the retirement of Juan de Borja y Castro (Lerma’s uncle), a position he held until 1617, when he was sent to Portugal as Viceroy and captain-general. In 1616, the year prior to this appointment, already holding the Spanish title of Count of Salinas, he was created Marquis of Alenquer so that he would also hold a Portuguese noble title.

He served as Viceroy of Portugal from 1617 to 1621. While some viewed his five-year tenure in Portugal as a resounding success—during which he strengthened coastal defenses, reorganized the outfitting of the Indies fleets, rebuilt arms manufactories, and improved internal administration—others saw it as a vivid example of the growing and unstoppable Castilian dominance over Portuguese life and governance He was replaced shortly after the death of King Philip II of Portugal (Philip III of Spain), who had appointed him. After the fall of the Duke of Lerma, Diego de Silva y Mendoza was one of the few protégés of Lerma to survive the change of regime under the Count-Duke of Olivares. He was even occasionally called upon by Olivares to offer advice on Portuguese affairs, since, after all, he remained the Spanish politician with the most experience and knowledge regarding the neighboring country.

Dom Diogo da Silva e Mendonça also achieved renown in Spanish literature, being considered an eminent poet of the Spanish Golden Age.

=== Marriage and children ===
In 1577, in accordance with his mother's express wishes, Diego first married the wealthy Luisa de Cárdenas Carrillo y Albornoz at the age of fourteen. The marriage was little short of a disaster for both parties and was finally annulled by the Roman Rota in 1590.

In 1592, Diego de Silva y Mendoza married Ana Sarmiento de Villandrando, Countess of Salinas and Ribadeo, who died three years later. They had a son Pedro, who also died young.

In 1599 Diego obtained a dispensation from Rome to marry her sister Marina de Sarmiento.
Marina died the following year while giving birth to a son,

- Rodrigo de Silva Mendoza y Sarmiento (1600–1664), 2nd Marqués of Alanquer, 2nd Count of Salinas, and Duke-consort of Híjar.

Diego de Silva y Mendoza never remarried, but lived for nearly twenty years in a scandalous liaison with Leonor Pimentel. She was the daughter of the 4th Marquis of Távara and the niece of his friend Diego Sarmiento de Acuña, 1st Count of Gondomar.
