= Juan de Escobedo =

16th-century Spanish politician (1530–1578)

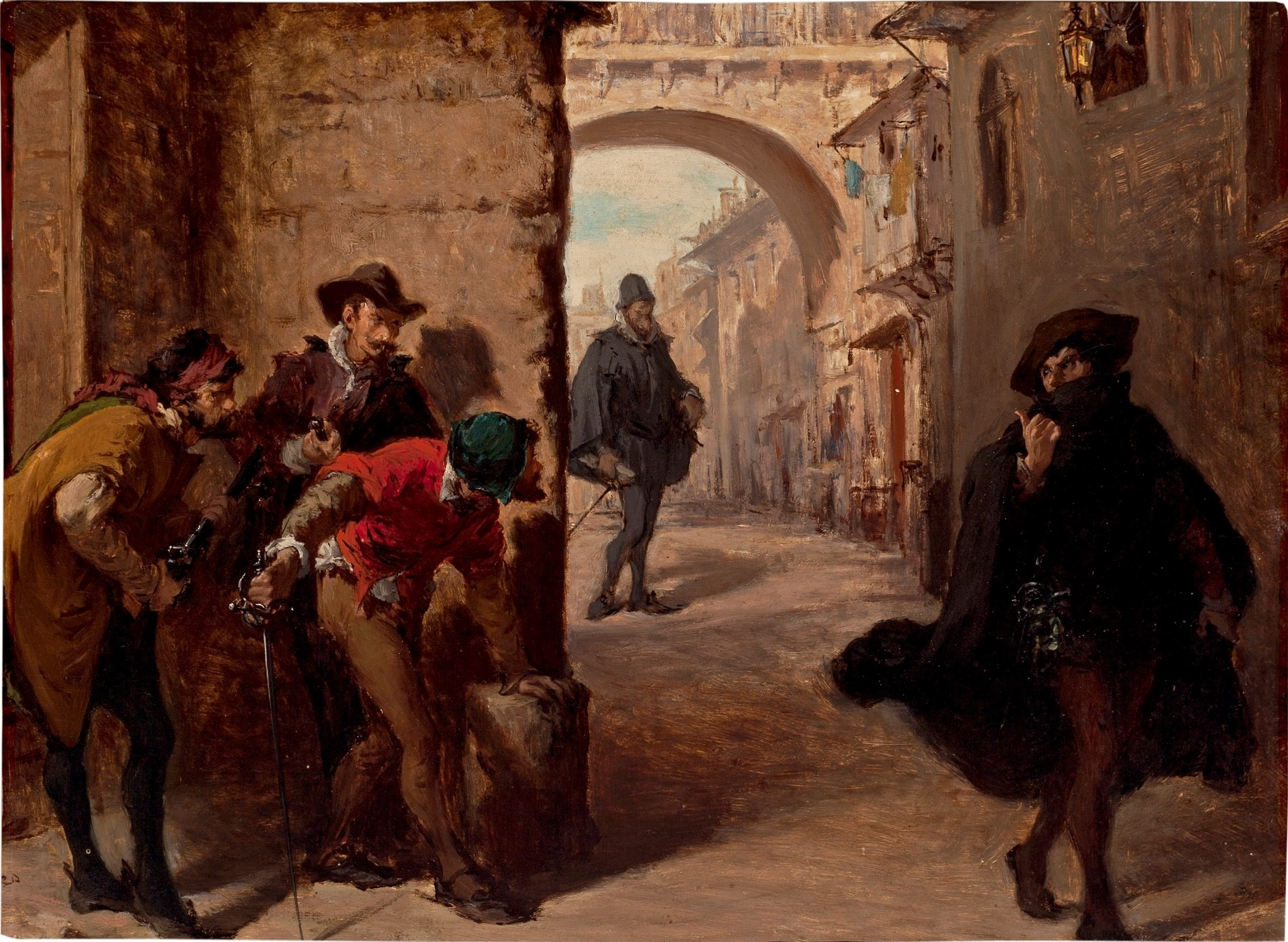
A painting depicting the death of Juan de Escobedo

Juan de Escobedo (1530 in Colindres, Cantabria – March 31, 1578 in Madrid), Spanish politician, secretary of John of Austria (Don Juan de Austria), and chiefly notable as having been the victim of one of the mysteries of the 16th century, began life in the household of Ruy Gómez de Silva, prince of Eboli, the most trusted minister of the early years of the reign of Philip II.

By the will of the prince he was endowed for life with the post of Regidor, or legal representative of the king in the municipality of Madrid. He was also associated with Antonio Pérez as one of the secretaries who acted as the agents of the king in all dealings with the various governing boards which formed the Spanish administration. When Don John of Austria, after the battle of Lepanto in 1571, began to launch on a policy of self-seeking adventure, Escobedo was appointed as his secretary with the intention that he should act as a check on these follies. Unhappily for himself and for Don John he went heart and soul into all the prince's schemes. He began to disobey orders from Madrid and became entangled in intrigues to manage or even to coerce the king.

In July 1577, and contrary to the king's orders, he came to Spain from Flanders, where Don John was then governor. It is said that he discovered the love intrigue between Antonio Pérez and the widowed princess of Eboli, Ana de Mendoza y de la Cerda. This is, however, mere gossip and supposition. There can be no doubt that he was a busy intriguer, or that the king, acting on the then very generally accepted doctrine that the sovereign has a right to act for the public interest without regard to forms of law, gave orders to Antonio Pérez that he was to be put out of the way. After two clumsy attempts had been made to poison him at Pérez's table, he was killed by bravos on the night of Easter Monday, 1578. According to an old tradition the murder took place outside the church of St. Maria in Madrid, which was pulled down in 1868.

== See also ==
- Antonio Pérez
- La Conjura de El Escorial (film)
