= Antonio Pérez (statesman) =

Spanish statesman

Antonio Pérez del Hierro
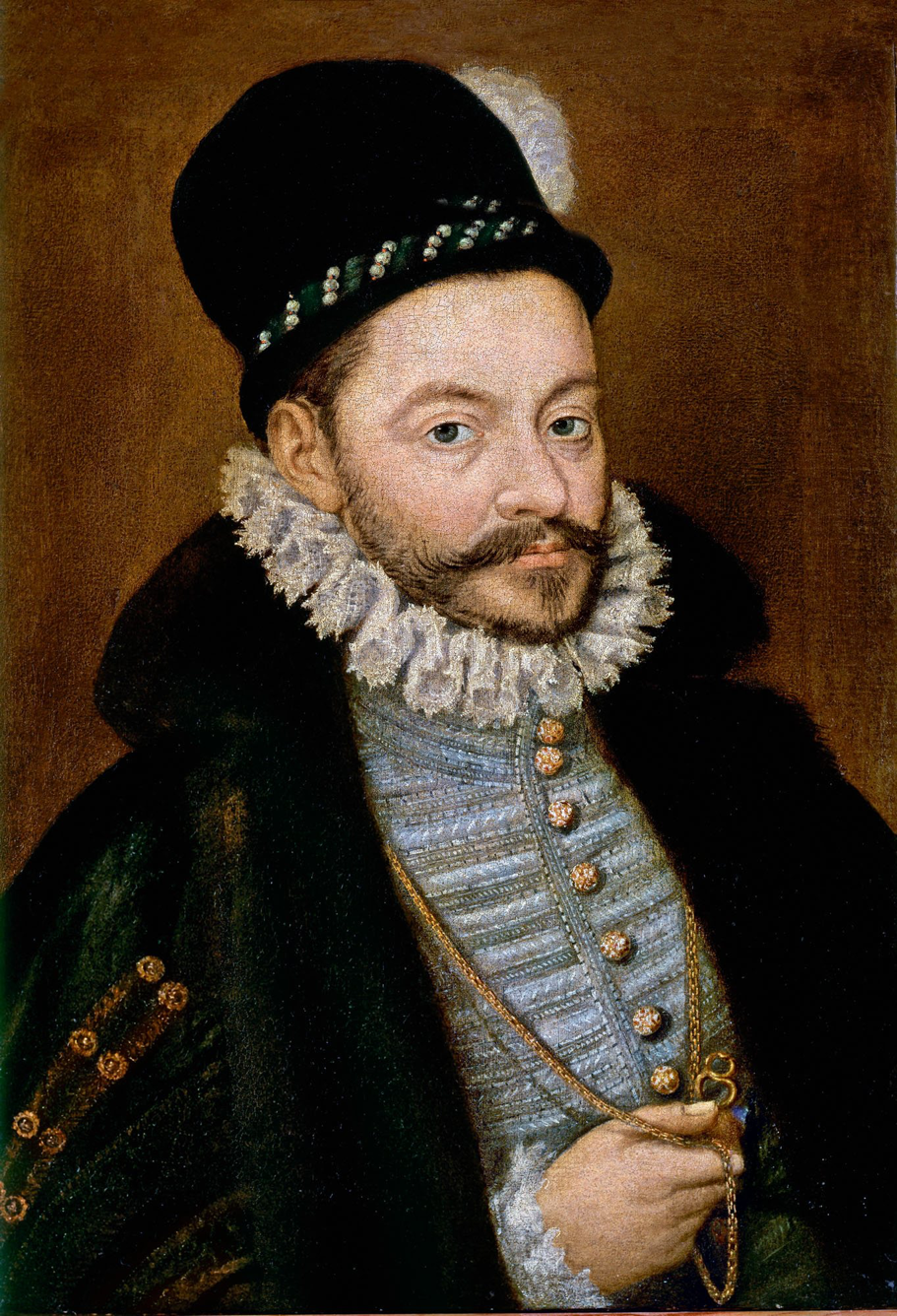
- Antonio Pérez (c. 1570), by Alonso Sánchez Coello. Hospital de Tavera, Toledo

Secretary of king Philip II of Spain.

Personal details
- Born: 1540 Place of birth is disputed.
- Died: 7 April 1611 (aged 70–71) Paris, Kingdom of France
- Education: University of Salamanca

Antonio Pérez del Hierro (1540–Paris, 7 April 1611) was a Spanish statesman and secretary of king Philip II of Spain.

He was said to have organised the murder of Juan de Escobedo. Attempts to prosecute Perez led to riots and disorder. He eventually fled Spain after being liberated from prison by his supporters, and spent most of his remaining years in France.

== Biography ==
=== Early years ===
His birthplace is disputed. In 1542 he was the natural son of Gonzalo Pérez, Secretary of the Council of State of king Charles I of Spain (Holy Roman Emperor Charles V)., who legitimised him and had him registered as aragonese born. Even though he was born in Madrid his attachment was to Aragon where his father was from and where his family was most influential. His followers and supporters were all from Aragon and later in life, he would flee to Aragon to find support for himself and protection from the king's persecution.

Antonio Pérez was raised in Val de Concha, Guadalajara, in the lands of Ruy Gómez de Silva, 1st Prince of Éboli and leader of one of the political factions of the time, of which Gonzalo Pérez was part. The other faction was that of the Duke of Alba. Antonio later attended the most prestigious universities such as Alcalá de Henares, Salamanca, Leuven, Venice and Padua. His father introduced and trained him in matters of State.

=== Secretary ===
In 1543, Gonzalo Pérez was appointed secretary of Prince (later king) Philip. In 1556, Charles abdicated his Spanish kingdoms to his son who became king Philip of the several Spanish kingdoms (Castile, Aragon, etc.) and Gonzalo Pérez continued as secretary of the new king. Gonzalo Pérez died in 1566 and his son Antonio was made Secretary of State of Castile a year later.

During his first ten years as secretary, Antonio Pérez had great influence over king Philip who valued his advice. With the death of the Prince of Eboli in 1573, Antonio Pérez became the leader of that faction in accord with the widow, Ana de Mendoza, the one-eyed Princess of Éboli.

In 1567, Antonio Pérez married Juana Coello with whom he had several sons.

=== Murder of Escobedo ===
Antonio Pérez is most remembered for his role in the murder of Juan de Escobedo, secretary of Don Juan of Austria.

King Philip was suspicious of the designs of his half-brother Don Juan of Austria and Antonio Pérez exploited this suspicion to his own benefit. By the advice of Antonio Pérez, in 1575, the king imposed Juan de Escobedo, whom Antonio Pérez considered trustworthy, as secretary of Don Juan of Austria. The design was that Escobedo would spy for Antonio Pérez but it turned out that, unexpectedly, Escobedo became faithful to Don Juan.

Antonio Pérez then began to make king Philip suspicious of Escobedo. Pérez, as secretary for the affairs of the Low Countries, was in a position to intercept and turn to his own advantage many innocent documents. He doctored reports and wrote derisive comments on the margins of letters destined for the king. He repeatedly insinuated to the king that Don Juan was plotting against him and Escobedo (code-named Verdinegro - "green-black") was encouraging him in his plotting. He convinced the king that Escobedo must be killed without judicial process for "reasons of State". The king gave his assent but had no other participation in the murder.

In early 1577, Don Juan was in the low Countries and Escobedo, his secretary, was visiting Madrid having been sent there by Don Juan. After three clumsy attempts to poison Escobedo failed, Pérez recruited swordsmen to assassinate him. Pérez removed himself from Madrid and, on the night of March 31, 1578, in a narrow alley, the assassins stabbed Escobedo to death. Insausti was the name of the killer and was helped by a group of loyals of Antonio Pérez, people from Aragon, where Antonio Pérez was from and where he was most powerful and influential. Immediately rumours were flying that Antonio Pérez was behind the killing.

A few months later, on October 1, Don Juan died of Typhus in the Low Countries. (His body was cut into three parts and secretly passed through France to Spain where it was reassembled and given a proper burial.)

King Philip soon became suspicious of the motives of his secretary and realized he had given his assent to a terrible crime. Nevertheless, he could not arrest him immediately as Pérez was a powerful man with information which could damage the king, including the murder of Escobedo.

At first, the family of Escobedo demanded an investigation but later they gave up this claim. They were probably paid off by Antonio Pérez or someone close to him.

=== Arrest and trials ===
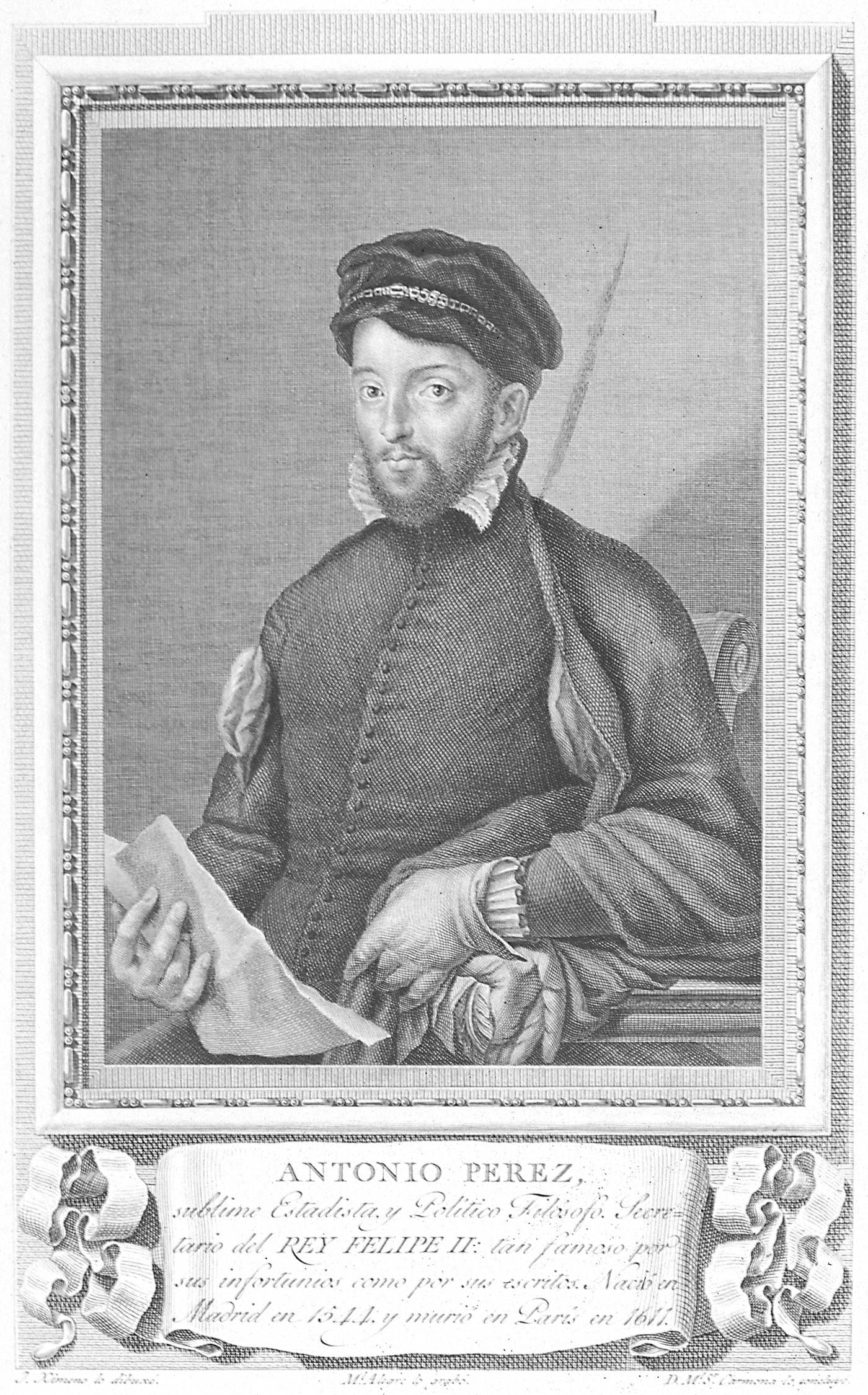
Antonio Pérez. 1791 engraving. Biblioteca Nacional de España. Madrid.

On 28 July 1579, Antonio Pérez and the Princess of Éboli were arrested by order of the king. The Princess of Éboli, as a proud woman who confronted the king, was kept imprisoned in different places, mostly in her palace in Pastrana, for the rest of her days. Antonio Pérez was more prudent and had compromising information so his situation with the king deteriorated slowly over time. At first, he was under house arrest and had relative freedom but his liberty was gradually diminished. Also, he thought it might be possible for him to regain the favour of the king.

In 1584, he was subject to the judicial process called visita which was an auditing or review of his service as Secretary of the king. In this process, he was formally accused of corruption and of altering ciphered messages to the king.

On 31 January 1585, he jumped out a window and sought asylum in a nearby church but the king's officers forced the door and arrested him without regard for the special judicial status of the church. This incident provoked a lawsuit from the church claiming infringements of their rights and demanding the man be returned to them but this claim went nowhere.

Antonio Pérez was taken prisoner to the castle of Turégano, near Segovia. On 23 March, he was notified of the sentence of the visita process: two years in prison, ten years banishment from the court with disqualification for all official posts as well as some monetary penalties.

While at Turégano Antonio Pérez enjoyed relative freedom, his wife and children went to live with him and he soon assembled, as was his custom, a retinue of followers.

Antonio Pérez plotted his own escape with the help of more followers who would take the castle at Turégano and overcome the guard. This group set up their base in the nearby village of Muñoveros and did manage to enter the castle in the middle of the night but the governor and his guard, outnumbered and against all odds, tricked them and convinced them to give up their attempt. As a result, Antonio Perez's property was confiscated and his wife and children were imprisoned in Madrid.

Finally, in 1587, Antonio Pérez was formally accused of the 1578 murder of Escobedo. This judicial process progressed very slowly and during this time Antonio Pérez was kept prisoner but moved around different towns and castles. During all this time his conditions varied from harsh to relative freedom. The intention of the king was to recover the incriminating papers which Pérez still kept hidden somewhere. Pérez knew that his safety depended on having these papers and would not produce them and the king's tactics alternated between punishing him or giving him more freedom. But the king was becoming aware that he was not getting the papers he wanted.

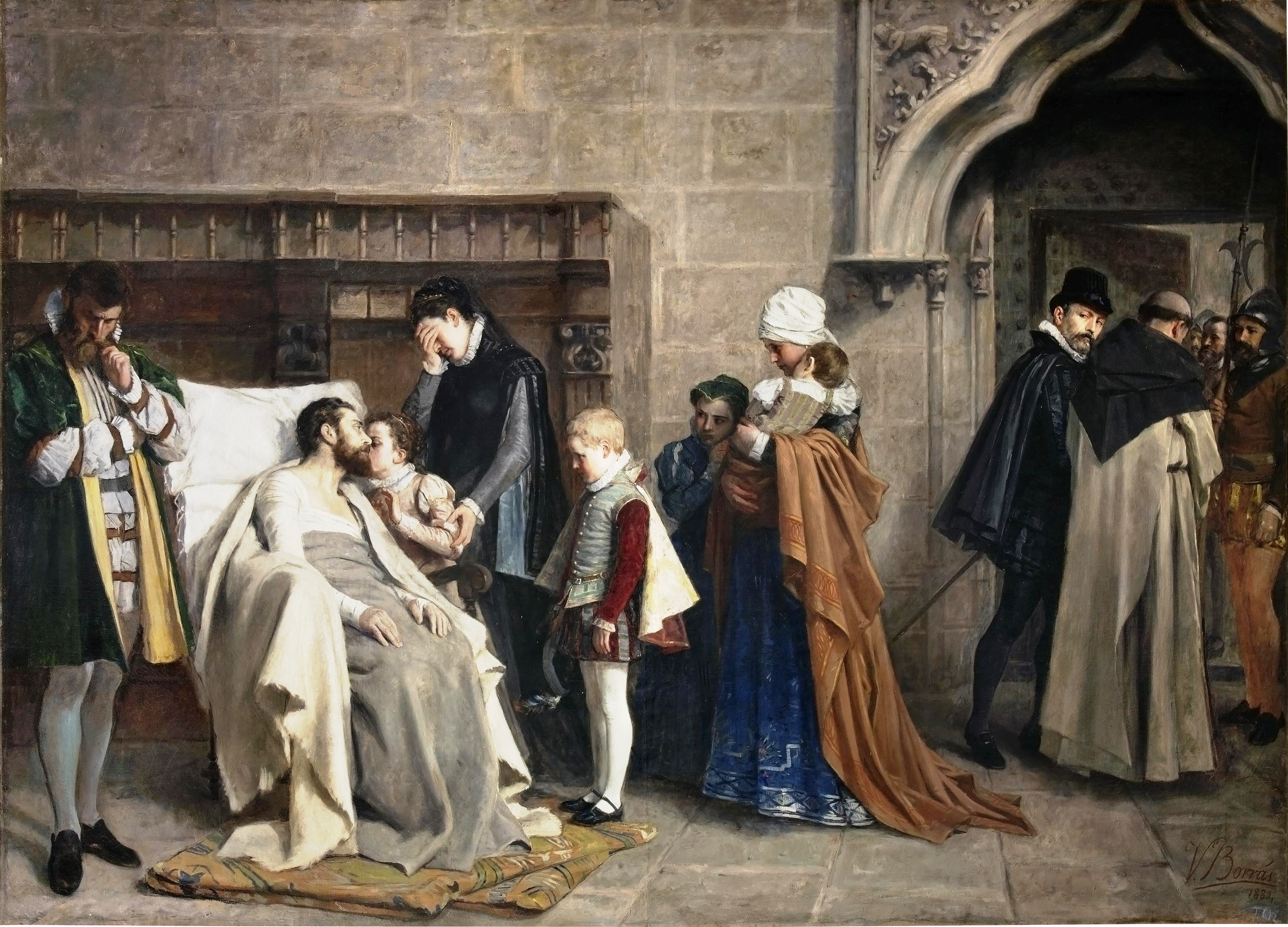
Antonio Pérez receiving his family after torture (Prado Museum), Madrid.

In early 1590, Antonio Pérez was questioned under torture but he only confessed very vaguely implying the king was behind the killing. At this point he believed he may be sentenced to die and so, again, he planned his escape. On 19 April, with the help of his wife, Juana Coello, who was eight months pregnant, in the evening, he escaped his prison in Madrid. The escape was very carefully planned. With two loyal men, he rode all night trying to gain the border of Aragon, a separate kingdom with laws that protected him. In spite of his age and his poor physical state after being tortured, they rode all night changing horses along the Royal Posts. A second group followed a short while later, disguised as servants of a nobleman, with the purpose of tiring the Posts' horses and thus making them unavailable should any officers of the king try to follow.

Once in Aragon they rested in the Monastery of Santa María de Huerta, then in Aragon (although this is not the case today as the border was later moved). A group of followers came to join them there with fresh horses and, further on, a military escort. He demanded the judicial process known as manifestación de personas, a form of habeas corpus which guaranteed his due process under the laws and justice of Aragon (fueros) and this was immediately granted. With this, he could not be extradited to Castile without a formal judicial process. He then moved slowly towards Zaragoza while he raised his supporters. On May 1 he entered triumphantly in Zaragoza surrounded by his followers and escorts. There he was put in the prison of manifestados subject to the justice of Aragon which for him meant protection from the king and the judicial process in Castile. In the prison of manifestados Antonio Pérez had great liberty. He received his friends and prepared his defence. He had access to all his documents which had been sent to Aragón even before his escape.

In the meanwhile, the king had immediately set the judicial process in motion. On 23 April, even before he had arrived in Zaragoza, a new judicial process was initiated by the king against Antonio Pérez in Aragon accusing him of being responsible for the murder of Escobedo, of having given the king false information with the purpose of getting him to approve the extrajudicial killing, of using secrets of State for his own ends and of falsifying messages to the king as he deciphered them as well as having escaped from prison.

On 1 July, in Madrid, the judge Rodrigo de Arce, issued a death sentence against Antonio Pérez.

To prevent any escape attempt a special guard was placed outside the prison of manifestados by order of the king and Antonio Pérez used this to his advantage by playing the issue as one of Castile infringing on the sovereignty of Aragon. By linking his case to that of the rights and freedoms of Aragon (known as fueros), Antonio Pérez cleverly obtained the support of the people of Aragon.

The courts of Aragon hindered the judicial process and it seemed Antonio Pérez would be found innocent so the king's accusation was withdrawn and a new, similar, accusation was presented by the king's representative in Aragon, Iñigo de Mendoza y de la Cerda, Marquis of Almenara. Also, on 1 September, a new accusation was presented by Philip as king of Aragon. In this new accusation, Pérez was accused of serving the king badly in matters relating to Aragon but he claimed in defence that never served the king in any matters related to Aragon.

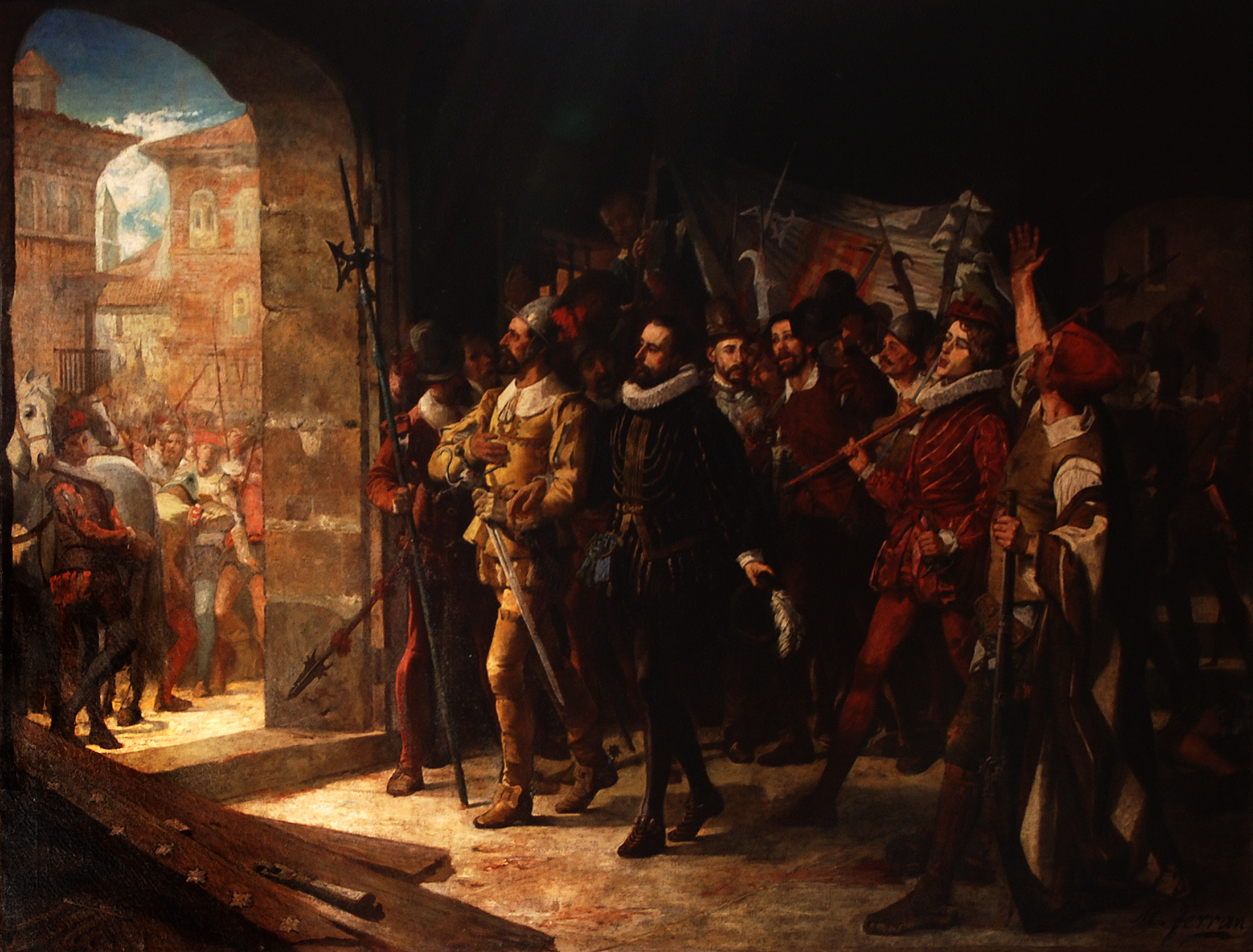
Antonio Perez released by the Aragonese people in 1591.

In 1591, Pérez made an unsuccessful attempt to escape and the judicial processes were moving very slowly. The king then resorted to the farce of accusing Antonio Pérez of heresy through the Inquisition which was an ecclesiastical organization and had jurisdiction in both Castile and Aragon. Alonso Molina de Medrano played an important role as inquisitor during the trial of Pérez. The purpose of this was to bypass the judicial system of Aragón.

On 13 May, Antonio Pérez was moved to a prison in the Aljafería which caused riots of the people of Aragon who considered this an affront and a violation of their laws. In the riots, the marquis of Almenara, representative of the king, was killed and soon Antonio Pérez was triumphantly returned to the prison of manifestados.

The situation was growing chaotic, the local authorities escaped in fear of the rioters and Pérez was planning his escape to France when the king ordered the invasion of Aragon by troops of Castile in a watershed move against the specific laws of Aragon and its limited self-government.

On 10 November 1591, Antonio Pérez fled Zaragoza and two days later the Aragonese armies crumbled and the royalist armies entered in the city without opposition.

The king ordered that the Chief Justice, Juan de Lanuza y Urrea, be executed without trial and on December 20, 1591, his head was exhibited for all the terrified people to see.

=== Escape and exile in France and England ===
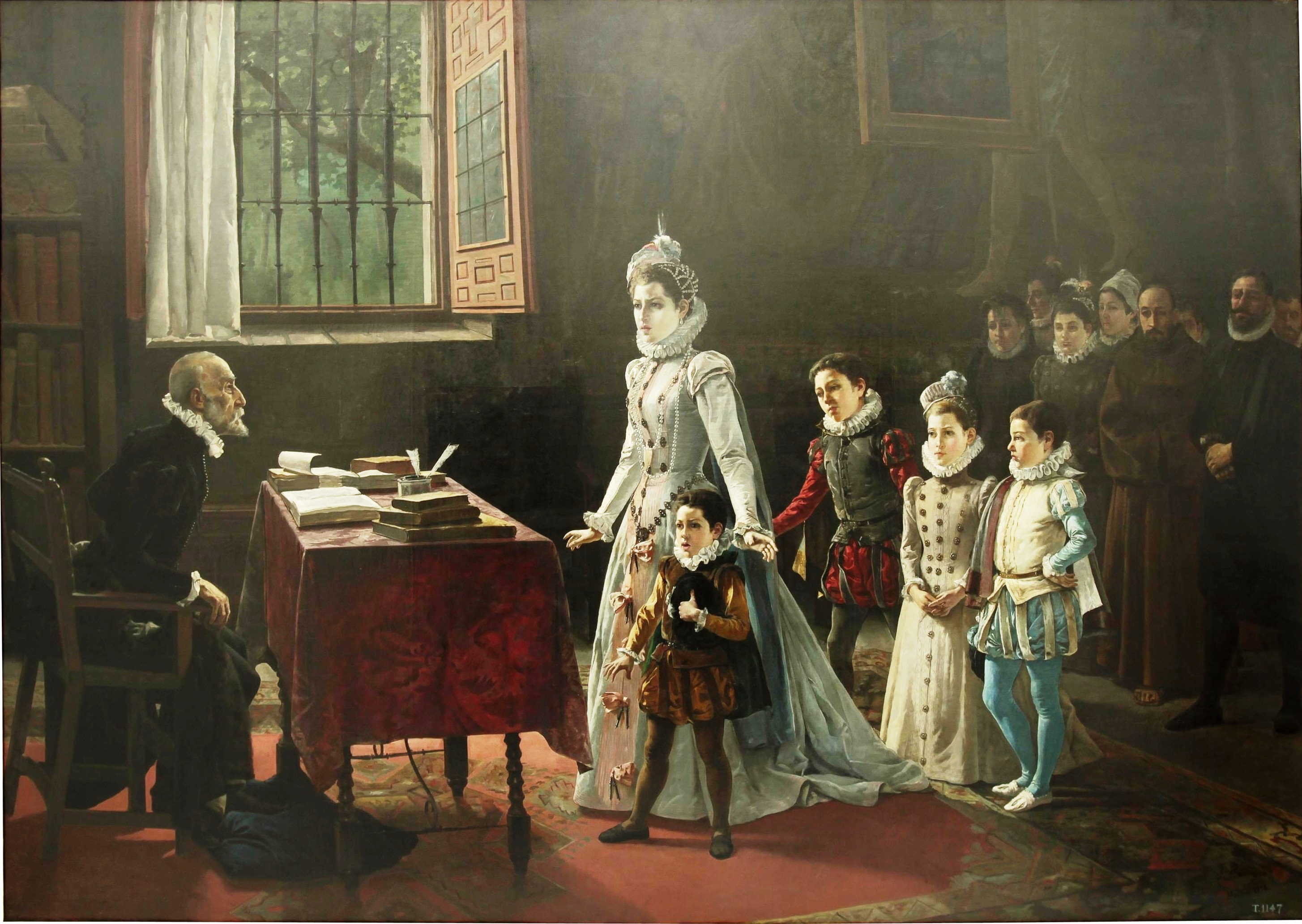
The children of Antonio Pérez before Rodrigo Vázquez (Prado Museum), Madrid.

On the night of 23 November, disguised as a shepherd and in heavy snow, Antonio Pérez crossed the Pyrenees into the Kingdom of Bearn-Navarre. He first went to Pau in Béarn where Catherine, sister of Henry III of Navarre (IV of France), governed.

He spent the rest of his life trying to make a living off the sale of the secrets he knew, but he failed to make an impression on Queen Elizabeth I and her chief minister William Cecil. In 1593, he arrived in England as a guest of Anthony Bacon and he was admired by the Essex circle for his knowledge of Tacitism. It was the printer Richard Field who printed Perez' Pedacos de Historia o Relaciones. He was a guest of Francis Bacon's on the famous Night of Errors at Gray's Inn when the throng of disorderly people nearly prevented a performance of A Comedy of Errors.

He was the target of several unsuccessful assassination attempts, originating with the Spanish Government: Patrick O'Collun and John Annias, executed in 1594 for conspiracy to kill the Queen, initially confessed only to an attempt to kill Perez, and the royal physician Rodrigo Lopez, who was executed for the same crime, was a party to a separate plot to kill him.

It has been claimed that Pérez was mocked in Love's Labour's Lost in the persona of the preposterous Spaniard Don Armado. Gustav Ungerer argued that there were many similarities between Perez and Armado, including their prose style and their love life.

Pérez was recalled to France by Henry of Navarre, now Henry IV. He remained there until the end of his days except for several travels to England.

Pérez's Relaciones along with the Apologia written by William of Orange in 1580, are largely responsible for the Black Legend that has grown around Philip II.

King Philip died in 1598. Antonio Pérez's wife and children, who were still imprisoned in Madrid, were set free.

In 1611, Antonio Pérez died in Paris and was interred in a convent, but his remains were lost during the desecrations of the French Revolution.

== See also ==
- Cortes of Tarazona (1592)

== Bibliography ==
- Imperial Spain 1469-1716 by JH Elliot
- Don Juan of Austria by Amarie Dennis, Madrid, 1966
- Gregorio Marañón in 1947 published a biography of Antonio Pérez and separately the same year, the documentary work Los procesos de Castilla contra Antonio Pérez (The Judicial Processes of Castile Against Antonio Pérez). Both are in Spanish and were republished in a single volume in 1970 as volume VI of the complete works of Gregorio Marañón. These are, probably, the most complete works documenting the life of Antonio Pérez.
- Green, Dominic The Double Life of Doctor Lopez London 2004- is informative on Perez's later life and the various plots to assassinate him.
- Sabatini, Rafael The Historical Nights Entertainment First Series One chapter of this book presents a fictional version of the murder of Escobedo, based primarily on Perez's writings.
