= The Ages of Lulu =

- Spanish original theatrical release poster
- Directed by: Bigas Luna
- Screenplay by: Bigas Luna
- Based on: Novel The Ages of Lulu by Almudena Grandes
- Produced by: Andrés Vicente Gómez
- Starring: Francesca Neri; María Barranco; Javier Bardem; Fernando Guillén Cuervo; Rosana Pastor; Pilar Bardem
- Cinematography: Fernando Arribas
- Edited by: Pablo González del Amo
- Music by: Carlos Segarra
- Production companies: Iberoamericana Films Internacional; Apricot
- Distributed by: United International Pictures
- Release dates: 3 December 1990 (Barcelona); 5 December 1990 (Spain)
- Running time: 95 minutes
- Country: Spain
- Language: Spanish

The Ages of Lulu (Spanish: Las edades de Lulú) is a 1990 Spanish erotic drama film written and directed by Bigas Luna and starring Francesca Neri, Óscar Ladoire, María Barranco and Javier Bardem in his film debut. It is based on the novel of the same name by Almudena Grandes. The film is about the title character's life and sexual awakening in Madrid, which leads to her involvement in increasingly dangerous sexual experimentation.

== Plot ==
The fifteen-year-old Lulú is seduced by Pablo, her brother Marcelo's best friend, who then leaves to work in the United States. Lulú is sustained for years by the belief that Pablo will come back into her life. When he returns he proposes to her and they are married. Pablo and Lulú have a passionate relationship, developing a taste for sexual games.

On one nocturnal expedition they join up with a transgender prostitute called Ely who becomes their friend. The couple have a daughter, Ines. Pablo convinces Lulú to participate blindfolded in a threesome; when Lulú discovers that the third person was Marcelo, her brother, she leaves Pablo in disgust, taking their daughter with her. However, her own desire to play increasingly dangerous sex games now comes to consume her.

After becoming aroused watching a gay porn movie, she seeks out gay men and pays them to join in orgies, or watch them having sex. Unable to pay enough to satisfy her desires, she meets a pimp called Remy who runs a secret S&M club. Ely tries to warn Lulú that Remy is dangerous, but Lulú ignores her, so Ely goes to warn Pablo. Remy tells Lulú to go to a club, where she is tied up by Jimmy, a gay man she had previously paid for sex.

She is forced to endure violent sex while gagged and bound. Ely tells Pablo that Lulú is in danger. She goes to the club to rescue her, but is attacked by Jimmy and killed when her head hits a metal bar. Pablo calls the police, who arrest Jimmy and the others. Lulú and Pablo are reunited.

== Cast ==
- Francesca Neri as Lulú
- Óscar Ladoire as Pablo
- María Barranco as Ely
- Javier Bardem as Jimmy
- Fernando Guillén Cuervo as Marcelo
- Rosana Pastor as Chelo
- Juan Graell as Remy
- Rodrigo Valverde as Pablito
- Pilar Bardem as Encarna
- Marta May as Lulú's mother
- Gloria Rodriquez as Cristina
- Ángel Jovè as Alicantino
- Ainara Pérez as Lulú as a child
- Juan Sala as Lulú's father
- Pepa Serrano as Flamenca

== Production ==
The film is an adaptation of the novel of the same name written by Almudena Grandes. Ángela Molina, who was originally cast in the lead role, withdrew when she learned how explicit the sex scenes were to be.

Javier Bardem has a small uncredited role, his first film role on screen. Bardem recalls he played a "prostitute that had sex with men and women; it was a tough movie, but a great movie." Penélope Cruz went to an audition for the film when she was 14, but lied and told the director, Bigas Luna, she was 17. He laughed in her face and told her: "Well, you won't make this movie, but I'll call for another when you're older."

In an interview, Bigas Luna recalled the episode when Francesca Neri, due to script requirements, was forced to shave her pubic hair and burst into tears before shooting one of the film's most scabrous scenes. He had to go and cheer her up and Neri, says Bigas Luna, "opened her bathrobe and shot her sex in my eyes and said to me, crying: 'Bigas, I'm sick, I look ugly, hideous'".

== Cuts in UK version ==
The film was cut in the UK by the BBFC. Most all the cuts were restored for the 2002 DVD release except for a few seconds that had "obscene imagery of children."

== Reception ==
The Ages of Lulu was listed on Film4's 50 Sexiest Film Moments. Rob Mackie wrote in The Guardian that this film is "precariously close to porn in its style, and it seems exploitative and it even comes to the usual soft-porn conclusion: the heroine goes through this and that, but then realises it's love that matters."

Marc Lee of The Daily Telegraph was blunt in his review, stating;"it's all very detailed and quite rude at times; it feels more like the realisation of a male fantasy than a genuine study of female sexuality, and worse still, the naughtiness turns to nastiness as Lulu descends into a dark world of sado-masochism. Worrying."

Geoffrey Macnab of Sight and Sound observed that "Luna has clearly given form to his own fantasies in this tale of a young woman's sexual awakening." He further opines that "the concept of a middle-class woman breaking through sexual boundaries is a hoary old cliché, but strong performances from the cast ensure that this just about rises above its exploitation pic roots, despite lacking the humour that characterises Luna's later films."

== Accolades ==
María Barranco won the Goya Award as Best Supporting Actress for her role as a transsexual prostitute.

== Home media ==
The Ages of Lulu was released on DVD by Umbrella Entertainment in December 2011. The DVD is compatible with region code 4.
