= La conjura de El Escorial =

- Film poster
- Directed by: Antonio del Real
- Written by: Antonio del Real; Manuel Mir
- Starring: Jason Isaacs; Julia Ormond; Jordi Mollà
- Distributed by: Mascara Films
- Release date: 5 September 2008
- Running time: 128 minutes
- Country: Spain
- Languages: Spanish; English

La conjura de El Escorial (The Escorial Conspiracy) is a 2008 Spanish historical drama film directed by Antonio del Real and starring Jason Isaacs, Julia Ormond, Jordi Mollà, Pilar Bastardés and Jürgen Prochnow. It is set in the reign of Philip II of Spain.

== Plot ==
On the night of Easter Monday March 31, 1578, assassins murdered the treasury secretary Juan de Escobedo in cold blood in the royal palace of El Escorial. A series of investigations ensue that are aimed at people close to the Court of Philip II.

== Cast ==
- Jason Isaacs as Antonio Pérez, royal secretary
- Julia Ormond as Princess of Éboli
- Jürgen Prochnow as Captain Espinosa
- Blanca Jara as Damiana, the servant girl, the love of Captain Espinosa
- Jordi Mollà as Mateo Vázquez, the investigating Jesuit father
- Joaquim de Almeida as Juan de Escobedo, secretary of Don Juan
- Juanjo Puigcorbé as King Philip II of Spain
- William Miller as Captain Rodrigo de Villena
- Fabio Testi as Duke of Alba

== Historical note ==
This fictional story is not to be confused with The El Escorial Conspiracy led by Crown Prince Ferdinand which occurred in 1807 during the reign of Ferdinand's father Charles IV of Spain.
