= Ana de Mendoza y de Silva, Princess of Éboli =

Spanish aristocrat (1540–1592)

The Princess of Eboli
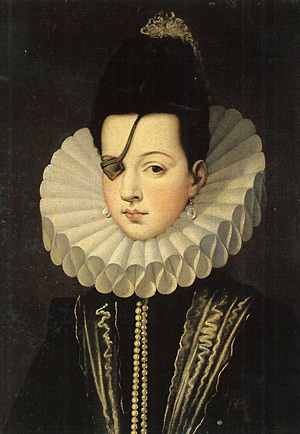
- Ana de Mendoza, Princess of Éboli
- Full name: Ana de Mendoza de la Cerda y de Silva Cifuentes
- Born: 29 June 1540; Cifuentes, Guadalajara, Spain
- Died: 2 February 1592 (aged 51); Pastrana, Guadalajara, Spain
- Noble family: House of Mendoza (by birth); House of Silva (by marriage)
- Spouses: Ruy Gómez de Silva (m. 1553, wid. 1573)
- Father: Diego Hurtado de Mendoza y de la Cerda
- Mother: Isabel Hurtrado de Mendoza

Ana de Mendoza de la Cerda y de Silva Cifuentes, Princess of Eboli, Duchess of Pastrana (in full, Spanish: Doña Ana de Mendoza y de la Cerda), (29 June 1540 – 2 February 1592) was a Spanish aristocrat, suo jure 2nd Princess of Mélito, 2nd Duchess of Francavilla and 3rd Countess of Aliano.

== Early years ==
She was the daughter of Diego Hurtado de Mendoza y de la Cerda (d.1578), Duke of Francavilla, Prince of Melito, Viceroy of Aragon and his wife, Doña Maria Catalina de Silva y Andrade, Countess de Cifuentes (d.1576).

== Marriage ==
Ana, Princess of Melito and Duchess of Pastrana, married Rui Gomes da Silva, 1st Prince of Éboli when she was 13 years old (1553), by recommendation of the regent of Spain, the future King Philip II. Her husband was a chief councillor and favorite of Philip's and Prince of Éboli from 1559. She may have been blind in one eye. The Princess of Éboli was considered very attractive. She was an energetic person, and prominent in court life. One of her friends was the queen, Isabel de Valois.

Ana, Princess of Éboli, had ten children by her marriage:

- Diego (c.1558–1563)
- Ana de Silva y Mendoza (1560–1610) married 1572 to Alonso Pérez de Guzmán, 7th Duke of Medina Sidonia
- Rodrigo de Silva y Mendoza (1562–1596), 2nd duke of Pastrana
- Pedro de Silva y Mendoza (c. 1563)
- Diego de Silva y Mendoza (1564–1630), 1st marquis of Alenquer
- Ruy de Silva y Mendoza (1565–), 1st marquis of La Eliseda
- Fernando de Silva y Mendoza, later Pedro González de Mendoza (1570–1639)
- Maria de Mendoza y Maria de Silva (c. 1570)
- Juan de Silva y Mendoza

== Later intrigue ==
After her husband's death in 1573, she spent three years in a convent, but returned to public life in 1576, forming an alliance at Court with the King's undersecretary of state, Antonio Pérez (1540–1615). They were accused of betraying state secrets which led to her arrest in 1579. Ana died 13 years later in prison on 2 February 1592.

== Appearances in fiction ==
There is a character called Princess Eboli based on Ana in Schiller's play Don Carlos, Infant von Spanien, and Verdi's opera Don Carlos. She is also the subject of Kate O'Brien's novel That Lady, and the 1955 film adaptation of O'Brien's novel, That Lady, starring Olivia de Havilland as Ana. The 5th and 6th episodes of 'Teresa de Jesus' filmed for Spanish television in 1984, starring Concha Velasco as Teresa and Patricia Adriani as Eboli, detail the founding of a convent of Carmelite nuns at the princess' request and all of the problems faced. 'La Tuerta', a stage play charting the life of Ana de Mendoza, was performed at Bedlam Theatre as part of The Edinburgh Fringe Festival in August 2008. Julia Ormond played her in La Conjura de El Escorial (2008) and Belén Rueda in the TV film La princesa de Éboli (2010). In 2018, the episode "The Princess Problem" of the children's television series Arthur had Lydia introduce D.W. to her as an example of a disabled princess, saying she was blinded in a childhood sword fight.
