= Juana Coello =

Juana Coello (c. 1548 in Madrid – ?) was the wife of Antonio Pérez, Secretary of State of Philip II of Spain, famous for having helped her husband escape from prison.

Coello received a good education and married in 1567. Her husband was revealed to be a womanizer; some authors claim that he had sex with the Princess of Eboli, the king's favorite, who put him in jail.

Juana visited her husband in prison and gave him her clothes, thus facilitating his escape. She remained behind, locked in the dungeon her husband had occupied. In 1585 he went to Portugal to see the king. When Juana moved from Aldea Gallega to Lisbon, she was seized and imprisoned again in the public jail of Madrid, together with her seven children. All were later transferred to a fortress, where she remained until April 1599, when Philip II was dead. Her children remained behind bars.

Little is known of the rest of her life. Some authors state that she went to Paris to join her husband and died in poverty at 1602. Others say that in 1613 she sought the rehabilitation of their children, to which the Inquisition of Zaragoza agreed two years later.
