= Ruy Gómez de Silva, 1st Prince of Éboli =

Portuguese noble

Rui Gomes da Silva I
- Prince of Éboli, Duke of Pastrana
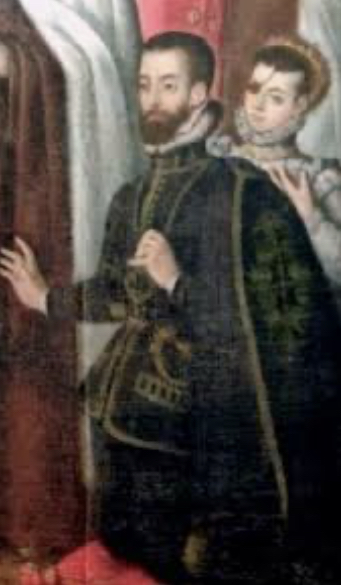

Prince of Éboli
- Born: 27 October 1516; Chamusca, Kingdom of Portugal
- Died: 29 July 1573 (aged 56); Madrid, Crown of Castile
- Spouse: Ana de Mendoza
- Issue Detail: Diogo, 1st Marquis of Alenquer; Rodrigo, 2nd Duke of Pastrana; Fernando, Bishop of Sigüenza
- Father: Francisco da Silva
- Mother: D. Maria de Noronha

Dom Rui Gomes da Silva (in Spanish, Ruy Gómez de Silva), 1st Prince of Eboli (27 October 1516 in Chamusca – 29 July 1573 in Madrid), was a Portuguese noble and one of King Philip II of Spain's main advisers.

== Early life ==
Rui Gomes da Silva was born in Chamusca, Portugal and was the second son of Dom Francisco da Silva, Lord of Ulme and Chamusca. In March 1526, he escorted Infanta Isabel of Portugal to Seville where she married Charles I of Spain.

He remained in Spain living within Isabel's entourage. In 1527, when Philip II of Spain was born, Rui became his page. An enormous friendship linked the two boys during their entire lives. In 1554 when his eldest brother John died, Rui inherited the lordship of Ulme and Chamusca.

== Ascension to power ==
When Philip inherited the Spanish throne in 1556, as Philip II, Rui, who had been close to one of the more influential ministers, received several honors, among them, prince of Éboli and Sumiller de Corps to the King. As a minister of Philip II, Rui Gomes da Silva had a remarkable importance within the Spanish politics, and Philip II granted him the highest nobility title, Grandee of Spain. In April 1559, he was one of the signatories of the Treaty of Cateau-Cambrésis which ended the Italian Wars with France.

== Ebolist party ==
Due to his influence in the Spanish Court, Rui was known among foreign ambassadors as "Rey Gomes" (King Gomes), instead of his Hispanicized name "Ruy Gomes". His biggest political adversary was Fernando Álvarez de Toledo, 3rd Duke of Alba. They had differing views concerning Spain's government. The Duke of Pastrana defended a much more federalist and compromise-oriented system, while the Duke of Alba was for the centralization of the power within a unified and martial monarchy.

== Marriage and issue ==
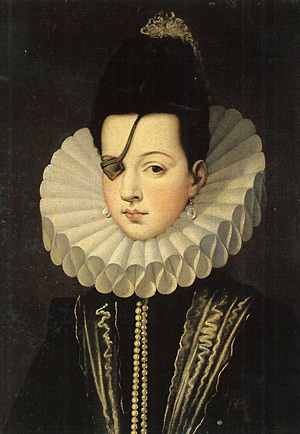
Ana de Mendoza, Princess of Éboli

In 1552, Rui became engaged to 12-year-old Ana de Mendoza, daughter of Diego Hurtado de Mendoza, 1st Duke of Francavilla, as per suggestion and request by Philip II. The formal wedding promise took place on 18 April 1553.

They had ten children:

- Jose da Silva Gomes III (c. 1558–1563)
- Ana da Silva e Mendonça, Duchess of Medina Sidonia (1560–1610)
- Rodrigo da Silva e Mendonça (1562–1596), 2nd Duke of Pastrana
- Pedro da Silva e Mendonça (c. 1563)
- Diego da Silva e Mendonça (1564–1630), Viceroy of Portugal (1615–1621), 1st Marquis of Alenquer
- Ruy da Silva e Mendonça (1565–?), 1st marquis of La Eliseda
- Fernando da Silva e Mendonça (10 February 1570 – 23 July 1639) Bishop of Sigüenza (1623–1639)
- Maria da Silva e Mendonça (c. 1570)
- Ana da Silva e Mendonça (1573–1614)

== Titles ==
In the Kingdom of Portugal, Rui Gomes da Silva was styled as:

- Rui Gomes da Silva, Lord of Ulme and of Chamusca

In the Crown of Castile, Rui Gomes da Silva was styled as:

- Ruy Gómez de Silva, Prince of Éboli, Duke of Pastrana, Duke of Estremera, Count of Melito

== Sources ==
- Boyden, James M. (1995). The Courtier and the King: Ruy Gómez de Silva, Phillip II, and the Court of Spain. University of California Press. ISBN 0-520-08622-8 ISBN 978-0520086227
- Haan, Bertrand (2010). Une Paix pour L'éternité; Traité du Cateau-Cambrésis (in French). Casa de Velázquez. ISBN 978-8490961308.
- Mother Love in the Renaissance: The Princess of Éboli's Letters to Her Favorite Son by Helen H. Reed, pags 152-176 in Power and Gender in Renaissance Spain, edit. by prof. Helen Nader. University of Illinois Press (2003).
- Eboli. Secretos de la vida de Ana de Mendoza by Ignacio Ares, Algaba Ediciones (2005).
- Ana de Mendoza y la Cerda (1540-1592)
- Rui Gómes da Silva (1516-1573)
