= List of Spanish films of 1988 =

A list of Spanish-produced and co-produced feature films released in Spain in 1988.

== Films ==
Release		Title (Domestic title)	Cast & Crew	Ref.
J A N U A R Y	22	The Most Amusing Game (El juego más divertido)	Director: Emilio Martínez-Lázaro Cast: Victoria Abril, Antonio Valero, Antonio Resines, Maribel Verdú, Santiago Ramos	
J A N U A R Y	28	Wait for Me in Heaven (Espérame en el cielo)	Director: Antonio Mercero Cast: José Soriano, José Sazatornil, Chus Lampreave	
F E B R U A R Y	18	El Lute: Run for Your Life (El Lute. Camina o revianta)	Director: Vicente Aranda Cast: Imanol Arias, Victoria Abril, Antonio Valero, Carlos Tristancho, Diana Peñalver	
F E B R U A R Y	19	Jarrapellejos	Director: Antonio Giménez-Rico Cast: Antonio Ferrandis, Juan Diego, Lydia Bosch, Amparo Larrañaga, Joaquín Hinojosa, Miguel A. Rellán, Aitana Sánchez-Gijón, Carlos Tristancho, Florinda Chico, José Coronado	
M A R C H	25	Women on the Verge of a Nervous Breakdown (Mujeres al borde de un ataque de nervios)	Director: Pedro Almodóvar Cast: Carmen Maura, Antonio Banderas, Julieta Serrano, María Barranco, Rossy de Palma	
A P R I L	19	El Dorado	Director: Carlos Saura Cast: Omero Antonutti, Lambert Wilson, Eusebio Poncela	
A P R I L	22	Matar al Nani	Director: Roberto Bodegas	
M A Y	5	El Lute II: Tomorrow I'll be Free (El Lute. Mañana seré libre)	Director: Vicente Aranda Cast: Imanol Arias, Pastora Vega, Ángel Pardo, Jorge Sanz	
M A Y	13	Sinatra	Director: Francesc Betriu Cast: Alfredo Landa, Ana Obregón, Maribel Verdú, Mercedes Sampietro	
M A Y	25	The Tunnel (El túnel)	Director: Antonio Drove Cast: Jane Seymour, Peter Weller, Fernando Rey	
J U N E	9	Pasodoble	Director: José Luis García Sánchez Cast: Fernando Rey, Juan Diego, Antonio Resines, Cassen, Mary Carmen Ramírez, Kiti Manver, Eva León, Miguel Rellán, Antonio Gamero, Luis Ciges, Pedro Reyes, Caroline Grimm	
J U L Y	1	Al acecho	Director: Gerardo Herrero Cast: Giuliano Gemma, Amparo Muñoz, Mario Gas, Cristina Marcos	
A U G U S T	21	Rowing with the Wind (Remando al viento)	Director: Gonzalo Suárez Cast: Hugh Grant, Lizzy McInnerny, Valentine Pelka, Elizabeth Hurley	
A U G U S T	25	Berlín Blues	Director: Ricardo Franco Cast: Julia Migenes, Keith Baxter, José Coronado, Javier Gurruchaga, Gerardo Vera	
S E P T E M B E R	29	Winter Diary (Diario de invierno)	Director: Francisco Regueiro Cast: Fernando Rey, Eusebio Poncela, Francisco Algora, Terele Pávez, Rosario Flores	
O C T O B E R	6	Malaventura	Director: Manuel Gutiérrez Aragón Cast: Miguel Molina, Richard Lintern, Icíar Bollaín, José Luis Borau	
O C T O B E R	7	The Little Spanish Soldier (Soldadito español)	Director: Antonio Giménez-Rico Cast: Maribel Verdú, Juan Luis Galiardo, María Garralón, Luis Escobar, Miguel A. Rellán, María Luisa San José, Félix Rotaeta, Amparo Baró, José Luis López Vázquez, Francisco Bas	
O C T O B E R	10	Baton Rouge	Director: Rafael Moleón Cast: Victoria Abril, Antonio Banderas, Carmen Maura, Ángel de Andrés López, Laura Cepeda, Noel Molina	
O C T O B E R	28	Scent of a Crime (El aire de un crimen)	Director: Antonio Isasi-Isasmendi Cast: Paco Rabal, Maribel Verdú, Germán Cobos, Chema Mazo, M.ª José Moreno, Miguel Rellán, Rafaela Aparicio, Agustín González, Ovidi Montllor, Terele Pávez, Alfred Lucchetti, Ramoncín, Fernando Rey	
N O V E M B E R	22	Miss Caribe	Director: Fernando Colomo Cast: Ana Belén, Santiago Ramos, Chus Lampreave, Juan Echanove	

== See also ==
- 3rd Goya Awards
