= 3rd Goya Awards =

- Date: 21 March 1989
- Site: Palacio de Congresos de Madrid
- Hosted by: Verónica Forqué and Antonio Resines

Highlights
- Best Film: Women on the Verge of a Nervous Breakdown
- Best Actor: Fernando Rey; Winter Diary
- Best Actress: Carmen Maura; Women on the Verge of a Nervous Breakdown
- Most awards: Rowing with the Wind (6)
- Most nominations: Women on the Verge of a Nervous Breakdown (16)

Television coverage
- Network: TVE

The 3rd Goya Awards ceremony, presented by the Academy of Cinematographic Arts and Sciences of Spain, took place in Madrid on 21 March 1989.

Women on the Verge of a Nervous Breakdown won the award for Best Film.

== Winners and nominees ==
The winners and nominees are listed as follows:

Best Film: Women on the Verge of a Nervous Breakdown; Rowing with the Wind; The Tunnel; Wait for Me in Heaven; Winter Diary	Best Director: Gonzalo Suárez – Rowing with the Wind; Pedro Almodóvar – Women on the Verge of a Nervous Breakdown; Ricardo Franco – Berlin Blues; Antonio Mercero – Wait for Me in Heaven; Francisco Regueiro – Winter Diary
Best Actor: Fernando Rey – Winter Diary; Imanol Arias – El Lute II: Tomorrow I'll be Free; Antonio Ferrandis – Jarrapellejos; Alfredo Landa – Sinatra; José Soriano – Wait for Me in Heaven	Best Actress: Carmen Maura – Women on the Verge of a Nervous Breakdown; Victoria Abril – Baton Rouge; Ana Belén – Miss Caribe; María Fernanda D'Ocón – Caminos de tiza; Ángela Molina – Lights and Shadows
Best Supporting Actor: José Sazatornil – Wait for Me in Heaven; Ángel de Andrés López – Baton Rouge; José Luis Gómez – Rowing with the Wind; Guillermo Montesinos – Women on the Verge of a Nervous Breakdown; Jorge Sanz – El Lute II: Tomorrow I'll be Free	Best Supporting Actress: María Barranco – Women on the Verge of a Nervous Breakdown; Laura Cepeda – Baton Rouge; Chus Lampreave – Wait for Me in Heaven; Terele Pávez – Winter Diary; Julieta Serrano – Women on the Verge of a Nervous Breakdown
Best Original Screenplay: Pedro Almodóvar – Women on the Verge of a Nervous Breakdown; Agustín Díaz, Rafael Moleón – Baton Rouge; Román Gubern, Antonio Mercero, Horacio Valcárcel – Wait for Me in Heaven; Rafael Azcona, José Luis García Sánchez – Pasodoble; Gonzalo Suárez – Rowing with the Wind	Best Adapted Screenplay: Antonio Giménez-Rico, Manuel Gutiérrez Aragón – Jarrapellejos; Vicente Aranda, Joaquim Jordà, Eleuterio Sánchez – El Lute II: Tomorrow I'll be Free; Félix Rotaeta – The Pleasure of Killing; Jorge R. Álamo, Gabriel Castro, Antonio Isasi-Isasmendi – Scent of a Crime; Carlos A. Cornejo, Antonio Drove, José A. Mahieu – The Tunnel
Best Cinematography: Carlos Suárez – Rowing with the Wind; Teodoro Escamilla – Berlin Blues; Teodoro Escamilla – El Dorado; José Luis Alcaine – Misadventure; José Luis Alcaine – Women on the Verge of a Nervous Breakdown	Best Editing: José Salcedo – Women on the Verge of a Nervous Breakdown; José Salcedo – Baton Rouge; Teresa Font – Berlin Blues; Pedro del Rey – El Dorado; José Salcedo – Rowing with the Wind
Best Art Direction: Wolfgang Burmann – Rowing with the Wind; Gerardo Vera – Berlin Blues; Rafael Palmero – Jarrapellejos; Félix Murcia – Women on the Verge of a Nervous Breakdown; Terry Pritchard – El Dorado	Best Production Supervision: José G. Jacoste – Rowing with the Wind; Emiliano Otegui – Berlin Blues; Víctor Albarrán – El Dorado; Marisol Carnicero – Pasodoble; Esther García – Women on the Verge of a Nervous Breakdown
Best Sound: Carlos Faruolo, Enrique Molinero – Berlin Blues; Gilles Ortion – El Dorado; Daniel Goldstein, Ricardo Steinberg – Pasodoble; Daniel Goldstein, Ricardo Steinberg – Rowing with the Wind; Gilles Ortion – Women on the Verge of a Nervous Breakdown	Best Special Effects: Basilio Cortijo, Gonzalo Gonzalo, Carlo De Marchis – Slugs; Reyes Abades – El Dorado; Alberto Nombela – El Lute II: Tomorrow I'll be Free; Reyes Abades – Rowing with the Wind; Reyes Abades – Women on the Verge of a Nervous Breakdown
Best Costume Design: Yvonne Blake – Rowing with the Wind; Gerardo Vera – Berlin Blues; Terry Pritchard, Maritza González – El Dorado; Javier Artiñano – Jarrapellejos; José María de Cossío – Women on the Verge of a Nervous Breakdown	Best Makeup and Hairstyles: Romana González, Josefa Morales – Rowing with the Wind; Paquita Núñez, José Antonio Sánchez – El Dorado; Agustín Caviedes, Juan Pedro Hernández – El Lute II: Tomorrow I'll be Free; Ángel Luis de Diego, Alicia Regueiro – Wait for Me in Heaven; Jesús Moncusi, Gregorio Ros – Women on the Verge of a Nervous Breakdown
Best Original Score: Carmelo Bernaola – Pasodoble; Alejandro Massó – El Dorado; Lalo Schifrin – Berlin Blues; Bernardo Bonezzi – Women on the Verge of a Nervous Breakdown; Alejandro Massó – Rowing with the Wind

== Honorary Goya ==
- Imperio Argentina

== See also ==
- List of Spanish films of 1988
