= Goya Award for Best Original Screenplay =

Annual award by the Spanish Film Academy

Goya Awards for Best Original Screenplay
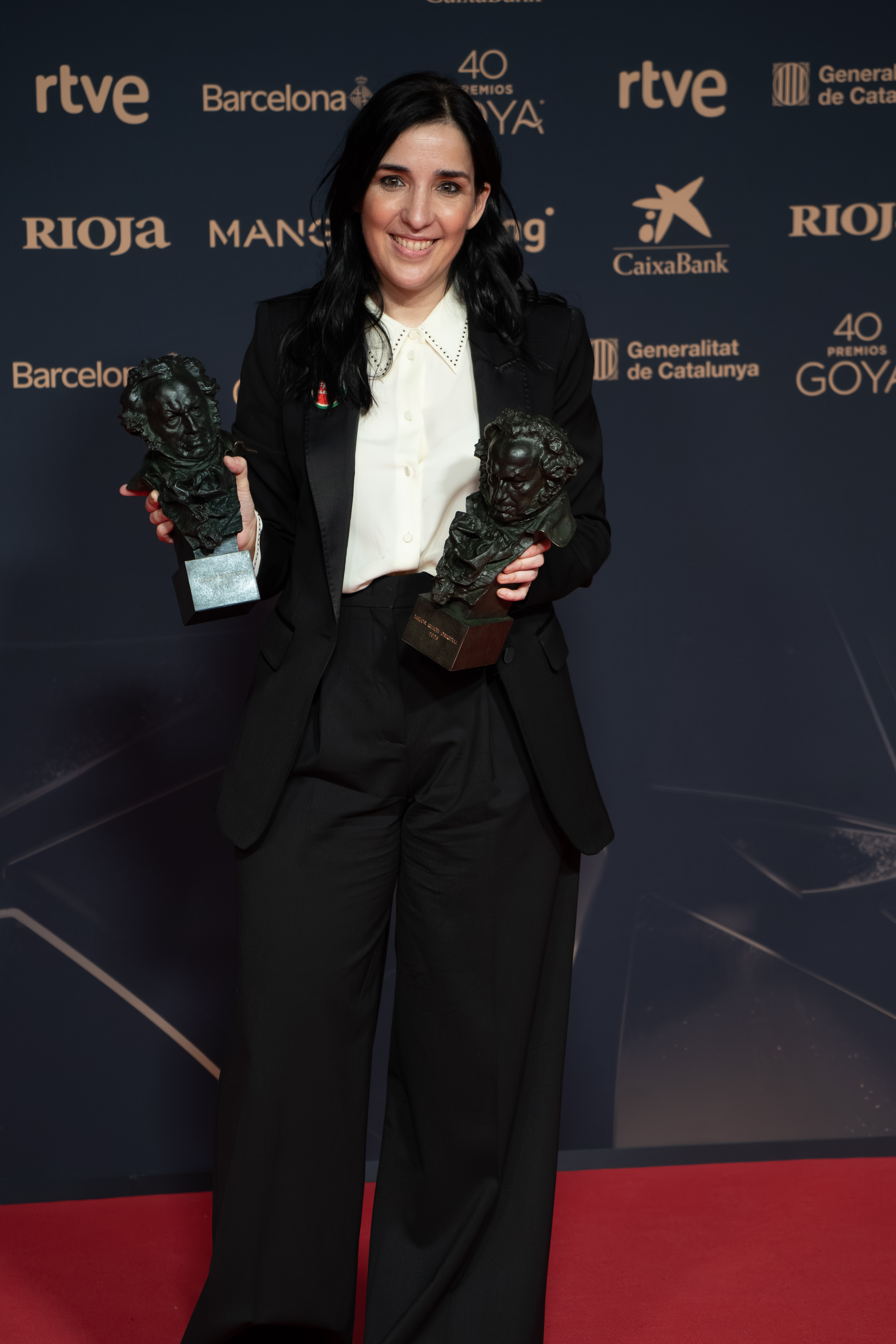
- The 2026 recipient: Alauda Ruiz de Azúa
- Native name: Premio Goya al mejor guión original
- Awarded for: Best original screenplay in a Spanish film of the year
- Country: Spain
- Presented by: Academy of Cinematographic Arts and Sciences of Spain (AACCE)
- First award: 1st Goya Awards (1986)
- Most recent winner: Alauda Ruiz de Azúa; Sundays (2025)
- Website: Official website

The Goya Award for Best Original Screenplay (Spanish: Premio Goya al mejor guión original) is one of the Goya Awards, Spain's principal national film awards.

For the first two editions of the Goya Awards, only one award for screenplays was presented which included both original and adapted screenplays, with both winners being adaptations, Voyage to Nowhere in 1986 (based on the novel of the same name by Fernando Fernán Gómez) and El bosque animado (based on the eponymous novel by Wenceslao Fernández Flórez) in 1987. Since the third edition, two awards are presented separately, Best Original Screenplay and Best Adapted Screenplay.

Alejandro Amenábar holds the record for most wins in this category with four victories, winning for Tesis (1996), The Others (2001), The Sea Inside (2004) and Agora (2009). Pedro Almodóvar has received more nominations in this category than any other nominee, with seven nominations.

== Winners and nominees ==
=== 1980s ===
Best Screenplay

Year	English title	Original title	Recipient(s)
1986 (1st)	Voyage to Nowhere	El viaje a ninguna parte	Fernando Fernán Gómez
1986 (1st)	Dear Nanny	Tata mía	José Luis Borau
1986 (1st)	Mambru Went to War	Mambrú se fue a la guerra	Fernando Fernán Gómez
1987 (2nd)	The Enchanted Forest	El bosque animado	Rafael Azcona
1987 (2nd)	La guerra de los locos		Manolo Matji
1987 (2nd)	Moors and Christians	Moros y cristianos	Luis García Berlanga and Rafael Azcona

Best Original Screenplay

Year	English title	Original title	Recipient(s)
1988 (3rd)	Women on the Verge of a Nervous Breakdown	Mujeres al borde de un ataque de nervios	Pedro Almodóvar
1988 (3rd)	Baton Rouge		Agustín Díaz Yanes and Rafael Monleón
1988 (3rd)	Wait for Me in Heaven	Espérame en el cielo	Antonio Mercero, Horacio Varcárcel and Román Gubern
1988 (3rd)	Rowing with the Wind	Remando al viento	Gonzalo Suárez
1989 (4th)	Moon Child	El niño de la luna	Agustí Villaronga
1989 (4th)	Amanece, que no es poco		José Luis Cuerda
1989 (4th)	El baile del pato		Manuel Iborra
1989 (4th)	The Things of Love	Las cosas del querer	Jaime Chávarri, Fernando Colomo and Lázaro Irazábal
1989 (4th)	The Flight of the Dove	El vuelo de la paloma	José Luis García Sánchez and Rafael Azcona

=== 1990s ===
Year	English title	Original title	Recipient(s)
1990 (5th)	Letters from Alou	Las cartas de Alou	Montxo Armendáriz
1990 (5th)	Tie Me Up! Tie Me Down!	¡Átame!	Pedro Almodóvar
1990 (5th)	Alone Together	A solas contigo	Agustín Díaz Yanes, Eduardo Calvo and Manolo Matji
1991 (6th)	Butterfly Wings	Alas de mariposa	Juanma Bajo Ulloa and Eduardo Bajo Ulloa
1991 (6th)	Lovers	Amantes	Álvaro del Amo, Carlos Pérez Merinero and Vicente Aranda
1991 (6th)	Anything for Bread	Todo por la pasta	Luis Marías
1992 (7th)	Belle Époque		Rafael Azcona, José Luis García Sánchez and Fernando Trueba
1992 (7th)	Jamón Jamón		Cuca Canals and Bigas Luna
1992 (7th)	Vacas		Julio Médem and Michel Gaztambide
1993 (8th)	Shadows in a Conflict	Sombras en una batalla	Mario Camus
1993 (8th)	Madregilda		Ángel Fernández Santos and Francisco Regueiro
1993 (8th)	Everyone Off to Jail	Todos a la cárcel	Jorge Berlanga and Luis García Berlanga
1994 (9th)	All Men Are the Same	Todos los hombres sois iguales	Joaquín Oristrell, Yolanda García Serrano, Juan Luis Iborra and Manuel Gómez Pereira
1994 (9th)	The Detective and Death	El detective y la muerte	Gonzalo Suárez
1994 (9th)	The Worst Years of Our Lives	Los peores años de nuestra vida	David Trueba
1995 (10th)	Nobody Will Speak of Us When We're Dead	Nadie hablará de nosotras cuando hayamos muerto	Agustín Díaz Yanes
1995 (10th)	Mouth to Mouth	Boca a boca	Manuel Gómez Pereira, Juan Luis Iborra, Joaquín Oristrell and Naomi Wise
1995 (10th)	The Day of the Beast	El día de la bestia	Jorge Guerricaechevarría and Álex de la Iglesia
1996 (11th)	Thesis	Thesis	Alejandro Amenábar
1996 (11th)	The Good Life	La buena vida	David Trueba
1996 (11th)	Things I Never Told You	Cosas que nunca te dije	Isabel Coixet
1997 (12th)	The Lucky Star	La buena estrella	Ricardo Franco and Ángeles González-Sinde
1997 (12th)	Familia		Fernando León de Aranoa
1997 (12th)	Secrets of the Heart	Secretos del corazón	Montxo Armendáriz
1998 (13th)	Barrio		Fernando León de Aranoa
1998 (13th)	Open Your Eyes	Abre los ojos	Alejandro Amenábar and Mateo Gil
1998 (13th)	Lovers of the Arctic Circle	Los amantes del círculo polar	Julio Médem
1998 (13th)	The Girl of Your Dreams	La niña de tus ojos	Rafael Azcona, Miguel Ángel Egea, Carlos López and David Trueba
1999 (14th)	Solas		Benito Zambrano
1999 (14th)	By My Side Again	Cuando vuelvas a mi lado	Gracia Querejeta, Elías Querejeta and Manuel Gutiérrez Aragón
1999 (14th)	Flores de otro mundo		Icíar Bollaín and Julio Llamazares
1999 (14th)	All About My Mother	Todo sobre mi madre	Pedro Almodóvar

=== 2000s ===
Year	English title	Original title	Recipient(s)
2000 (15th)	Pellet	El Bola	Achero Mañas and Verónica Fernández
2000 (15th)	Common Wealth	La comunidad	Jorge Guerricaechevarría and Álex de la Iglesia
2000 (15th)	Leo		José Luis Borau
2000 (15th)	You're the One	Una historia de entonces	José Luis Garci and Horacio Valcárcel
2001 (16th)	The Others	Los otros	Alejandro Amenábar
2001 (16th)	Sex and Lucia	Lucía y el sexo	Julio Medem
2001 (16th)	Don't Tempt Me	Sin noticias de Dios	Agustín Díaz Yanes
2001 (16th)	No Shame	Sin vergüenza	Dominic Harari, Joaquín Oristrell, Teresa Pelegri and Cristina Rota
2002 (17th)	In the City Without Limits	En la ciudad sin límites	Enrique Brasó and Antonio Hernández
2002 (17th)	Talk to Her	Hable con ella	Pedro Almodóvar
2002 (17th)	Mondays in the Sun	Los lunes al sol	Ignacio del Moral and Fernando León de Aranoa
2002 (17th)	Smoking Room		Julio Wallovits and Roger Gual
2003 (18th)	Take My Eyes	Te doy mis ojos	Icíar Bollaín and Alicia Luna
2003 (18th)	In the City	En la ciudad	Tomàs Aragay and Cesc Gay
2003 (18th)	The Hours of the Day	Las horas del día	Jaime Rosales and Enric Rufas
2003 (18th)	Torremolinos 73		Pablo Berger
2004 (19th)	The Sea Inside	Mar adentro	Alejandro Amenábar and Mateo Gil
2004 (19th)	Hours of Light	Horas de luz	José Ángel Esteban, Carlos López and Manolo Matji
2004 (19th)	Inconscientes		Joaquín Oristrell, Teresa de Pelegrí and Dominic Harari
2004 (19th)	Roma		Adolfo Aristarain, Mario Camus and Kathy Saavedra
2005 (20th)	The Secret Life of Words	La vida secreta de las palabras	Isabel Coixet
2005 (20th)	7 Virgins	7 vírgenes	Alberto Rodríguez and Rafael Cobos
2005 (20th)	Other Days Will Come	Otros días vendrán	Eduard Cortés and Piti Español
2005 (20th)	Princesas		Fernando León de Aranoa
2006 (21st)	Pan's Labyrinth	El laberinto del fauno	Guillermo del Toro
2006 (21st)	DarkBlueAlmostBlack	Azuloscurocasinegro	Daniel Sánchez Arévalo
2006 (21st)	The Night of the Sunflowers	La noche de los girasoles	Jorge Sánchez-Cabezudo
2006 (21st)	Volver		Pedro Almodóvar
2007 (22nd)	The Orphanage	El orfanato	Sergio G. Sánchez
2007 (22nd)	13 Roses	13 rosas	Ignacio Martínez de Pisón
2007 (22nd)	Mataharis		Icíar Bollaín and Tatiana Rodríguez
2007 (22nd)	Oviedo Express		Gonzalo Suárez
2007 (22nd)	Seven Billiard Tables	Siete mesas de billar francés	David Planell and Gracia Querejeta
2008 (23rd)	Camino		Javier Fesser
2008 (23rd)	Cenizas del cielo		Dionisio Pérez, José Antonio Quirós and Ignacio del Moral
2008 (23rd)	Return to Hansala	Retorno a Hansala	Chus Gutiérrez and Juan Carlos Rubio
2008 (23rd)	Just Walking	Sólo quiero caminar	Agustín Díaz Yanes
2009 (24th)	Agora	Ágora	Alejandro Amenábar and Mateo Gil
2009 (24th)	After		Alberto Rodríguez and Rafael Cobos
2009 (24th)	Fat People	Gordos	Daniel Sánchez Arévalo
2009 (24th)	Broken Embraces	Los abrazos rotos	Pedro Almodóvar

=== 2010s ===
Year	English title	Original title	Recipient(s)
2010 (25th)	Buried	Buried (Enterrado)	Chris Sparling
2010 (25th)	The Last Circus	Balada triste de trompeta	Álex de la Iglesia
2010 (25th)	Biutiful		Alejandro González Iñárritu, Armando Bó Jr. and Nicolás Giacobone
2010 (25th)	Even the Rain	También la lluvia	Paul Laverty
2011 (26th)	No Rest for the Wicked	No habrá paz para los malvados	Enrique Urbizu and Michel Gaztambide
2011 (26th)	Midnight in Paris		Woody Allen
2011 (26th)	Blackthorn		Miguel Barros
2011 (26th)	EVA		Sergi Belbel, Cristina Clemente, Martí Roca and Aintza Serra
2012 (27th)	Blancanieves		Pablo Berger
2012 (27th)	The Artist and the Model	El artista y la modelo	Fernando Trueba and Jean-Claude Carrière
2012 (27th)	Unit 7	Grupo 7	Alberto Rodríguez
2012 (27th)	The Impossible	Lo imposible	Sergio G. Sánchez
2013 (28th)	Living Is Easy with Eyes Closed	Vivir es fácil con los ojos cerrados	David Trueba
2013 (28th)	Family United	La gran familia española	Daniel Sánchez Arévalo
2013 (28th)	Three Many Weddings	Tres bodas de más	Breixo Corral and Pablo Alén
2013 (28th)	Wounded	La herida	Fernando Franco and Enric Rufas
2014 (29th)	Marshland	La isla mínima	Alberto Rodríguez and Rafael Cobos
2014 (29th)	El Niño		Daniel Monzón and Jorge Guerricaechevarría
2014 (29th)	Magical Girl		Carlos Vermut
2014 (29th)	Wild Tales	Relatos salvajes	Damián Szifron
2015 (30th)	Truman		Cesc Gay and Tomàs Aragay
2015 (30th)	Nothing in Return	A cambio de nada	Daniel Guzmán
2015 (30th)	Retribution	El desconocido	Alberto Marini
2015 (30th)	Negotiator	Negociador	Borja Cobeaga
2016 (31st)	The Fury of a Patient Man	Tarde para la ira	Raúl Arévalo and David Pulido
2016 (31st)	To Steal from a Thief	Cien años de perdón	Jorge Guerricaechevarría
2016 (31st)	The Olive Tree	El olivo	Paul Laverty
2016 (31st)	May God Save Us	Que Dios nos perdone	Rodrigo Sorogoyen and Isabel Peña
2017 (32nd)	Giant	Handia	Aitor Arregi, Andoni de Carlos, Jon Garaño and José Mari Goenaga
2017 (32nd)	Abracadabra		Pablo Berger
2017 (32nd)	Summer 1993	Estiu 1993	Carla Simón
2017 (32nd)	Verónica		Fernando Navarro and Paco Plaza
2018 (33rd)	The Realm	El reino	Isabel Peña and Rodrigo Sorogoyen
2018 (33rd)	Champions	Campeones	Javier Fesser and David Marqués
2018 (33rd)	Carmen & Lola	Carmen y Lola	Arantxa Echevarría
2018 (33rd)	Everybody Knows	Todos lo saben	Asghar Farhadi
2019 (34th)	Pain and Glory	Dolor y gloria	Pedro Almodóvar
2019 (34th)	The Platform	El hoyo	David Desola and Pedro Rivero
2019 (34th)	The Endless Trench	La trinchera infinita	Luiso Berdejo and Jose Mari Goenaga
2019 (34th)	While at War	Mientras dure la guerra	Alejandro Amenábar and Alejandro Hernández

=== 2020s ===
Year	English title	Original title	Recipient(s)
2020 (35th)	Schoolgirls	Las niñas	Pilar Palomero
2020 (35th)	Rosa's Wedding	La boda de Rosa	Alicia Luna and Icíar Bollaín
2020 (35th)	Unfortunate Stories	Historias lamentables	Javier Fesser and Claro García
2020 (35th)	Adú		Alejandro Hernández
2021 (36th)	The Good Boss	El buen patrón	Fernando León de Aranoa
2021 (36th)	Libertad		Clara Roquet
2021 (36th)	Maixabel		Icíar Bollaín, Isa Campo
2021 (36th)	Out of Sync	Tres	Juanjo Giménez Peña, Pere Altimira
2022 (37th)	The Beasts	As bestas	Isabel Peña, Rodrigo Sorogoyen
2022 (37th)	Alcarràs		Arnau Vilaró, Carla Simón
2022 (37th)	Lullaby	Cinco lobitos	Alauda Ruiz de Azúa
2022 (37th)	Manticore	Mantícora	Carlos Vermut
2022 (37th)	Prison 77	Modelo 77	Alberto Rodríguez, Rafael Cobos
2023 (38th)	20,000 Species of Bees	20.000 especies de abejas	Estibaliz Urresola Solaguren
2023 (38th)	Close Your Eyes	Cerrar los ojos	Víctor Erice, Michel Gaztambide
2023 (38th)	Love & Revolution	Te estoy amando locamente	Carmen Garrido, Alejandro Marín
2023 (38th)	Upon Entry		Alejandro Rojas, Juan Sebastián Vásquez
2023 (38th)	Not Such an Easy Life	Una vida no tan simple	Félix Viscarret
2024 (39th)	A House on Fire	Casa en flames	Eduard Sola
2024 (39th)	The 47	El 47	Alberto Marini, Marcel Barrena
2024 (39th)	The Blue Star	La estrella azul	Javier Macipe
2024 (39th)	Undercover	La infiltrada	Amèlia Mora, Arantxa Echevarría
2024 (39th)	Marco, the Invented Truth	Marco, la verdad inventada	Aitor Arregi, Jon Garaño, Jorge Gil Munarriz, Jose Mari Goenaga
2025 (40th)	Sundays	Los domingos	Alauda Ruiz de Azúa
2025 (40th)	Maspalomas		Jose Mari Goenaga
2025 (40th)	Sirāt		Oliver Laxe, Santiago Fillol
2025 (40th)	She Walks in Darkness	Un fantasma en la batalla	Agustín Díaz Yanes
2025 (40th)	The Portuguese House	Una quinta portuguesa	Avelina Prat
