= Volver =

2006 Spanish film by Pedro Almodóvar

- Theatrical release poster
- Directed by: Pedro Almodóvar
- Written by: Pedro Almodóvar
- Produced by: Esther García
- Starring: Penélope Cruz; Carmen Maura; Lola Dueñas; Blanca Portillo; Yohana Cobo; Chus Lampreave
- Cinematography: José Luis Alcaine
- Edited by: José Salcedo
- Music by: Alberto Iglesias
- Production company: El Deseo
- Distributed by: Warner Bros. Entertainment España
- Release date: 17 March 2006 (Spain)
- Running time: 121 minutes
- Country: Spain
- Language: Spanish
- Budget: $9.4 million
- Box office: $87.2 million

Volver (Spanish pronunciation: [bolˈβeɾ]; lit. 'To return') is a 2006 Spanish comedy-drama film written and directed by Pedro Almodóvar. The film features an ensemble cast that includes Penélope Cruz, Carmen Maura, Lola Dueñas, Blanca Portillo, Yohana Cobo, and Chus Lampreave. Revolving around an eccentric family of women from a wind-swept region south of Madrid, Cruz stars as Raimunda, a working-class woman forced to go to great lengths to protect her 14-year-old daughter Paula. To top off the family crisis, her mother Irene returns from the dead to tie up loose ends.

The plot originates in Almodóvar's earlier film The Flower of My Secret (1995), where it features as a novel which is rejected for publication, but is stolen to form the screenplay of a film named The Freezer. Drawing inspiration from the Italian neorealism of the late 1940s to early 1950s and the work of pioneering directors such as Federico Fellini, Luchino Visconti, and Pier Paolo Pasolini, Volver addresses themes like sexual abuse, loneliness and death, mixing the genres of farce, tragedy, melodrama, and magic realism. Set in the La Mancha region, Almodóvar's place of birth, the filmmaker cited his upbringing as a major influence on many aspects of the plot and the characters.

Volver premiered at the 2006 Cannes Film Festival, where it competed for the Palme d'Or. It received critical acclaim and ultimately won two awards at the festival, for Best Actress (shared by the six main actresses) and Best Screenplay. The film's Spanish premiere was held on 10 March 2006 in Puertollano, where the filming had taken place. It was selected as the Spanish entry for the Best Foreign Language Oscar for the 79th Academy Awards, making the January shortlist. Cruz was nominated for the 2006 Academy Award for Best Actress, making her the first Spanish woman ever to be nominated in that category.

== Plot ==
Raimunda, her sister Sole and Raimunda's daughter Paula are visiting the small village of Alcanfor de las Infantas, in La Mancha region of Spain. Though they both now live in Madrid, the sisters grew up in the village. The three have returned to take care of the gravesite of their parents, who died in a fire a few years previous, and to visit their ailing, dementia-impaired aunt, also named Paula. They also call on Agustina, a next door neighbor who looks in on their aunt every day.

Raimunda and Paula live with Raimunda's husband, Paco, who Paula believes is her father. When Paco attempts to rape Paula, saying that he is not really her father, Paula stabs him to death in self-defense. Claiming her husband has run off, Raimunda hides his corpse in the deep-freezer of a shut-down nearby restaurant she is minding for the absent owner, Emilio. When members of a film crew come to the restaurant to cater a week's meals, the resourceful Raimunda strikes a deal to earn much needed money in her husband's absence.

Meanwhile, Sole returns to the village upon hearing that Aunt Paula has passed. At Aunt Paula's wake Agustina confesses to Sole that she heard Paula talking to the ghost of Sole's and Raimunda's mother, Irene. Encountering her mother's ghost herself in Aunt Paula's house, upon returning to Madrid, Sole finds that the ghost was stowed away in the trunk of her car. Sole lets Irene stay with her to assist at the illicit hair salon Sole operates out of her apartment, posing as a Russian immigrant who doesn't speak Spanish. The two conceal Irene's presence from Raimunda, who hates her mother.

Raimunda reveals to Paula that Paco was not her biological father, promising to tell her the whole story later. Leaving Paula with Sole, with the help of two paid suitably unquestioning female neighbors, Raimunda rents a van and transports the freezer containing the body to a spot by the river Júcar, where they bury it.

Meanwhile, diagnosed with terminal cancer, Agustina comes to Madrid for treatment. When Raimunda visits her in the hospital, Agustina asks Raimunda if she has seen her mother's ghost; Raimunda fears that Agustina too is exhibiting dementia. Agustina hopes the ghost will be able to tell her about her own mother, who disappeared three years before. While staying in Sole's apartment, Paula meets her grandmother's ghost, growing close to her. The next night, Agustina comes to the restaurant and reveals two startling secrets: her mother and Raimunda's father were having an affair, and her mother disappeared on the same day that Raimunda's parents died.

Sole reveals to a skeptical Raimunda that she has seen their mother's ghost, who is in the next room with Paula. Revealing the whole truth, Irene admits that she did not die in the fire. The reason for Raimunda and her estrangement, Irene has come to realize, is that Raimunda's father sexually abused Raimunda, resulting in the birth of Paula. Thus, Paula is Raimunda's daughter and her sister. Unaware of Raimunda's sexual abuse until Aunt Paula told her about it, Irene has never forgiven herself for being oblivious to it and believing Raimunda's pregnancy due to promiscuity. Finding her husband asleep in bed with another woman, Irene started the fire that killed them both. The ashes presumed to be Irene's were the ashes of Agustina's mother, the woman with whom Irene's husband was having an affair.

After the fire, Irene wandered for several days in the countryside until deciding to turn herself in. First, however, she wanted to say goodbye to Aunt Paula, with whom Irene had been living prior to setting the fire and who had lost the ability to look after herself. Paula welcomed Irene home as if nothing had happened, and Irene stayed, caring for her sister and expecting that the police would come soon to arrest her. Due to the closed nature of the superstitious community, however, the police never came. Accustomed to tales of the dead returning, the residents explained the rare sightings of Irene as ghost sightings.

The family reunites at Aunt Paula's house. Irene reveals her presence to Agustina, who continues to believe her to be a ghost. As penance, Irene pledges to stay in the village and care for Agustina as her cancer worsens, saying to Raimunda that it is the least she can do after killing Agustina's mother. Raimunda and her mother embrace and promise to repair their relationship, with Raimunda regularly visiting her mother at Agustina's house.

== Cast ==
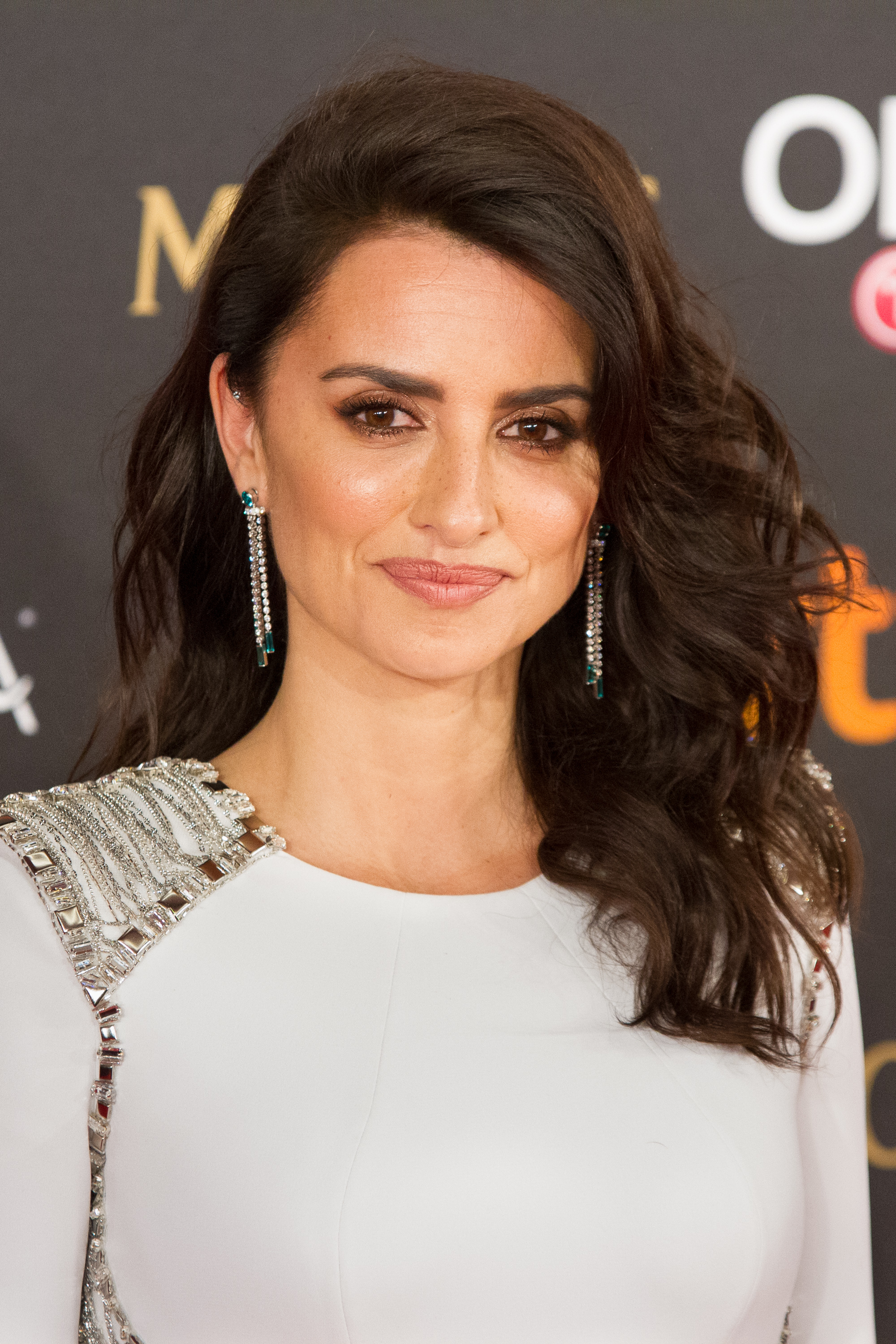
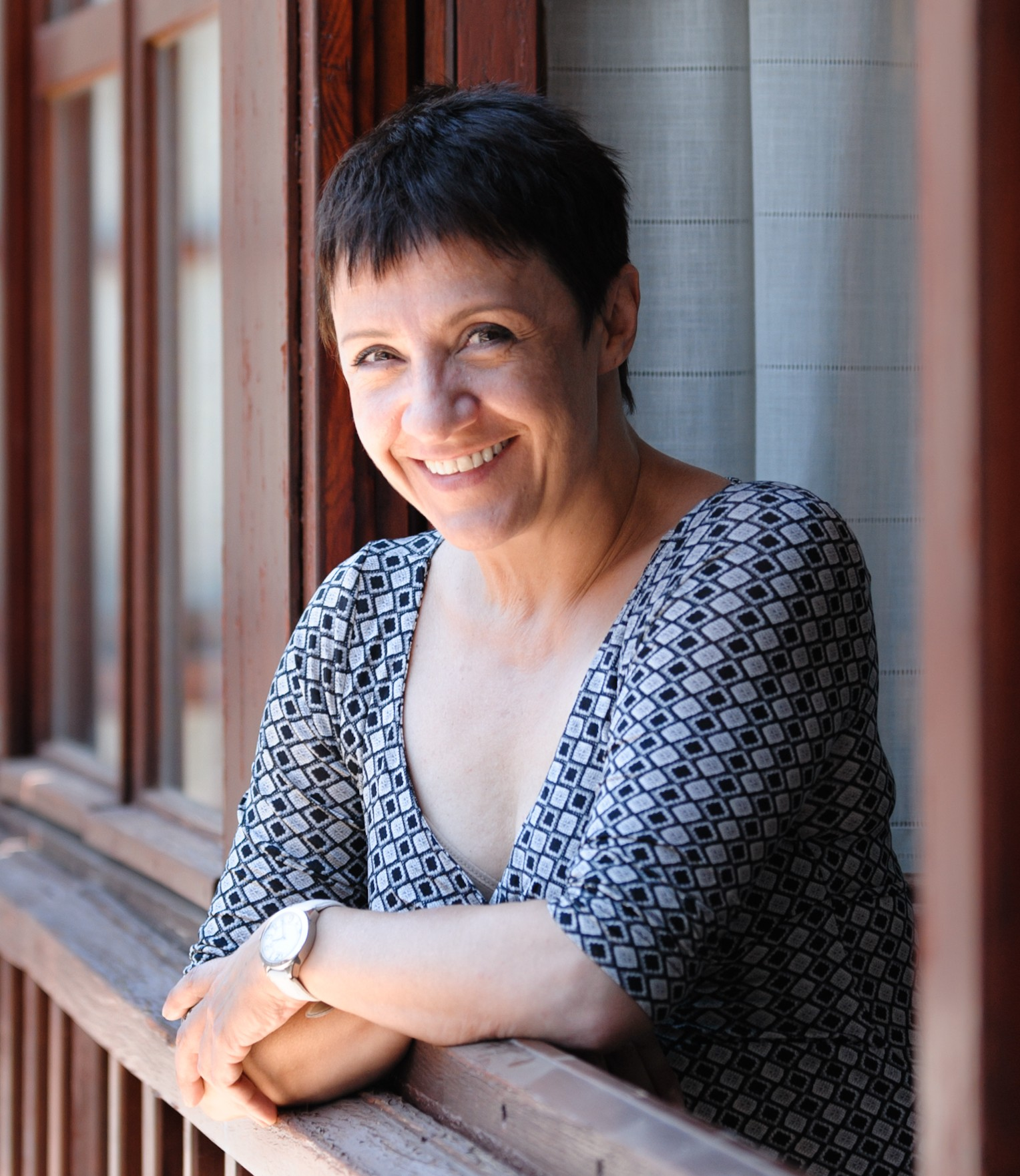
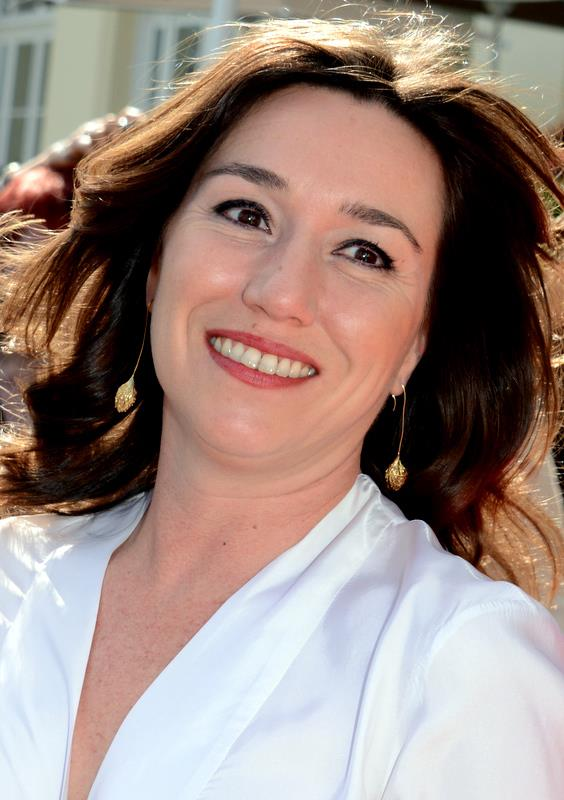
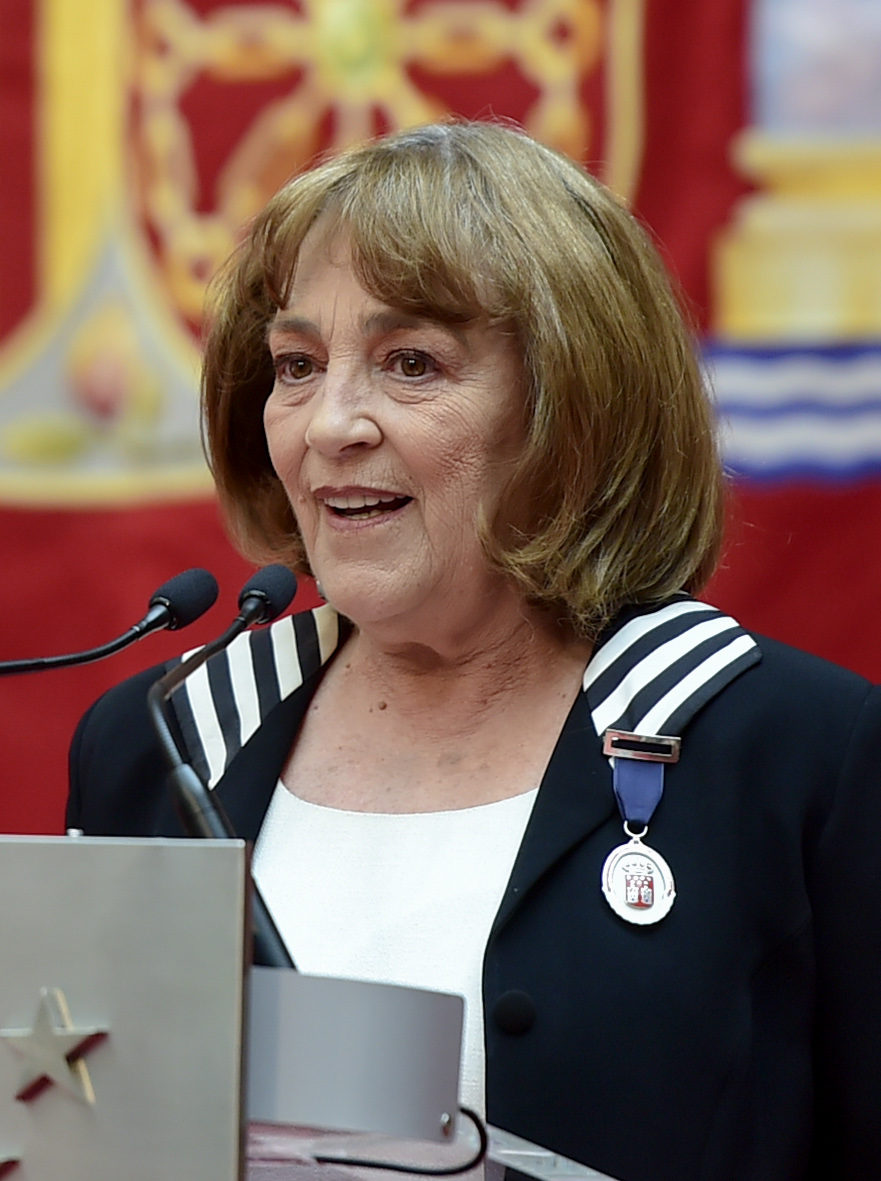
Top to bottom: Penélope Cruz, Blanca Portillo, Lola Dueñas and Carmen Maura star in the film.
- Penélope Cruz as Raimunda, a mother living in Madrid's suburbs
- Carmen Maura as Irene Trujillo, the mother of Raimunda and Sole
- Yohana Cobo as Paula
- Blanca Portillo as Agustina
- Lola Dueñas as Soledad ("Sole")
- Chus Lampreave as Aunt Paula
- Antonio de la Torre as Paco
- María Isabel Díaz as Regina
- Carlos Blanco as Emilio
- Neus Sanz as Inés
- Leandro Rivera as Auxiliar Producción
- Yolanda Ramos as Presentadora TV

== Production ==
=== Origins ===
Volver was first developed by Pedro Almodóvar, based on a story actress Marisa Paredes told him during the production of their 1995 film The Flower of My Secret, another film set in the La Mancha region. The story revolved around a heartbroken Puerto Rican man who opts to kill his mother-in-law in hopes of reuniting with his beloved wife, who left him and broke off contact, at her mother's funeral. Owning a restaurant, he leaves it in his neighbour's care, when he is about to kill his victim. Fascinated by the story and its background, Almodóvar decided on incorporating elements of it into the screenplay of The Flower of My Secret, making it the plot of a movie-within-the-movie based on the main character's novel in the film. While working on the script for Volver, he would however settle on outlining the role of the neighbour Raimunda, as the film's central character, while Emilio, the Puerto Rican, eventually became a supporting role only.

Almodóvar says of the story that "it is precisely about death...More than about death itself, the screenplay talks about the rich culture that surrounds death in the region of La Mancha, where I was born. It is about the way (not tragic at all) in which various female characters, of different generations, deal with this culture".

=== Casting ===
Penélope Cruz was the first reported to have landed one of the starring roles in Volver, having previously worked with Almodóvar on his films Live Flesh (1997) and All About My Mother (1999). In preparing for her role, the actress watched Italian neorealism films from the 1950s, many of them starring Sophia Loren and Claudia Cardinale, to study "the Italian maggiorate" that Almodóvar envisioned for her performance in the film. Cruz, who had to wear a prosthetic bottom while filming, noted the role of Raimunda as "the best gift an actress can get".

Carmen Maura, the star of Almodóvar's debut Pepi, Luci, Bom (1980) and five additional films with the director, was the first to be cast in the film alongside Cruz. Her engagement marked her first collaboration with Almodóvar after a period of 18 years and a reported fallout during the production of Women on the Verge of a Nervous Breakdown (1989). Maura commented on the "borderline character" of Irene as a "very complicated [role to play]".

=== Filming ===
Shooting locations included Almagro.

== Music ==
The tango "Volver" by Carlos Gardel with lyrics by Alfredo Le Pera is converted to flamenco and is sung in the movie with the voice of Estrella Morente and lip synced by Penélope Cruz. The dance tune playing at the party prior to Raimunda's lip syncing is called "Good Thing" by the British three-piece indie-dance combo Saint Etienne.

== Reception ==
=== Box office ===
In the US alone, the film had made $12,897,993 (15.4% of the total) at the box office after 26.4 weeks of release in 689 theatres. The box office figure from the rest of the world is somewhere in the region of $71,123,059 (84.6% of the total), according to Box Office Mojo. The total worldwide gross is estimated at $84,021,052.

As of 22 January 2007, the film had grossed $12,241,181 at the Spanish box office.

=== Critical reception ===
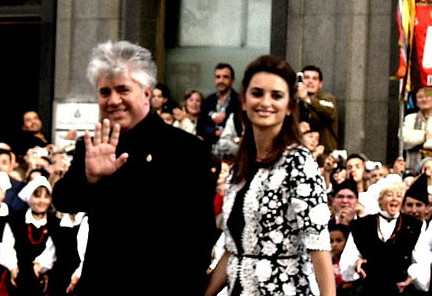
Almodóvar and Cruz on the red carpet at the 2006 Prince of Asturias Awards.

Fotogramas, Spain's top film magazine, gave it a five-star rating. Upon its US release, A. O. Scott made it an "NYT Critics' Pick" and wrote:

To relate the details of the narrative—death, cancer, betrayal, parental abandonment, more death—would create an impression of dreariness and woe. But nothing could be further from the spirit of Volver which is buoyant without being flip, and consoling without ever becoming maudlin. Mr. Almodóvar acknowledges misfortune—and takes it seriously—from a perspective that is essentially comic. Very few filmmakers have managed to smile so convincingly in the face of misery and fatality: Jean Renoir and Billy Wilder come immediately to mind, and Mr. Almodóvar, if he is not yet their equal, surely belongs in their company. Volver is often dazzling in its artifice—José Luis Alcaine's ripe cinematography, Alberto Iglesias's suave, heart-tugging score— but it is never false. It draws you in, invites you to linger and makes you eager to return.

Roger Ebert gave it his highest rating of four, calling it "enchanting, gentle, transgressive" and notes "Almodovar is above all a director who loves women—young, old, professional, amateur, mothers, daughters, granddaughters, dead, alive. Here his cheerful plot combines life after death with the concealment of murder, success in the restaurant business, the launching of daughters and with completely serendipitous solutions to (almost) everyone's problems".

On Rotten Tomatoes, the film has a 91% rating from critics, based on 158 positive reviews out of 173 critics, and an average rating of 7.8/10. The site's consensus states: "Volver catches director Pedro Almodóvar and star Penélope Cruz at the peak of their respective powers, in service of a layered, thought-provoking film". On Metacritic, it has a weighted average score of 84 out of 100 based on 38 critics.

=== Top ten lists ===
The film appeared on many critics' top ten lists of the best films of 2006.

- 2nd – Marjorie Baumgarten, The Austin Chronicle
- 3rd – Glenn Kenny, Premiere
- 3rd – Kevin Crust, Los Angeles Times
- 3rd – Richard Corliss, Time
- 3rd – Philip Martin, Arkansas Democrat-Gazette
- 4th – Andrew O'Hehir, Salon
- 4th – Peter Travers, Rolling Stone
- 4th – Ray Bennett, The Hollywood Reporter
- 5th – Desson Thomson, The Washington Post
- 6th – Claudia Puig, USA Today
- 6th – Scott Tobias, The A.V. Club
- 7th – Kenneth Turan, Los Angeles Times
- 8th – A. O. Scott, The New York Times
- 8th – Keith Phipps, The A.V. Club
- 8th – Kirk Honeycutt, The Hollywood Reporter
- 8th – Stephen Holden, The New York Times
- 9th – Shawn Levy, The Oregonian
- 10th – David Ansen, Newsweek
  General top ten
- Carina Chocano, Los Angeles Times
- Carrie Rickey, The Philadelphia Inquirer
- Joe Morgenstern, The Wall Street Journal
- Liam Lacey and Rick Groen, The Globe and Mail

Sight & Sound's critics poll named Volver the second-best film of 2006. In 2019, The Guardian ranked the film 46th in its 100 best films of the 21st century list. In 2025, the New York Times' "The 100 Best Movies of the 21st Century" ranked Volver at number eighty. It was also one of the films voted for the "Readers' Choice" edition of the list, finishing at number 197.

=== Accolades ===
Volver received a standing ovation when it was screened as part of the official selection at the 2006 Cannes Film Festival, and won the Best Screenplay award as well as the award for Best Actress — which was shared by the six stars of the film.

Year	Award	Category	Nominee(s)	Result	Ref.
2006	59th Cannes Film Festival	Best Actress	Penélope Cruz, Carmen Maura, Lola Dueñas, Blanca Portillo, Yohana Cobo and Chus Lampreave	Won	
2006	59th Cannes Film Festival	Best Screenplay	Pedro Almodóvar	Won	
2006	19th European Film Awards	Best Film		Nominated	
2006	19th European Film Awards	Best Director	Pedro Almodóvar	Won	
2006	19th European Film Awards	Best Screenwriter	Pedro Almodóvar	Nominated	
2006	19th European Film Awards	Best Actress	Penélope Cruz	Won	
2006	19th European Film Awards	Best Cinematographer	José Luis Alcaine	Won	
2006	19th European Film Awards	Best Composer	Alberto Iglesias	Won	
2006	11th Satellite Awards	Best Foreign Language Film		Won	
2006	11th Satellite Awards	Best Actress – Drama	Penélope Cruz	Nominated	
2006	11th Satellite Awards	Best Director	Pedro Almodóvar	Nominated	
2006	11th Satellite Awards	Best Screenplay – Original	Pedro Almodóvar	Nominated	
2006	19th Chicago Film Critics Association Awards	Best Actress	Penélope Cruz	Nominated	
2006	19th Chicago Film Critics Association Awards	Best Foreign Language Film		Nominated	
2007	78th National Board of Review Awards	Best Foreign Language Film		Won	
2007	7th Vancouver Film Critics Circle Awards	Best Foreign Language Film		Won	
2007	64th Golden Globe Awards	Best Actress – Drama	Penélope Cruz	Nominated	
2007	64th Golden Globe Awards	Best Foreign Language Film		Nominated	
2007	12th Critics' Choice Awards	Best Actress	Penélope Cruz	Nominated	
2007	12th Critics' Choice Awards	Best Foreign Language Film		Nominated	
2007	5th Golden Eagle Awards	Best Foreign Language Film		Won	
2007	21st Goya Awards	Best Film		Won	
2007	21st Goya Awards	Best Director	Pedro Almodóvar	Won	
2007	21st Goya Awards	Best Original Screenplay	Pedro Almodóvar	Nominated	
2007	21st Goya Awards	Best Actress	Penélope Cruz	Won	
2007	21st Goya Awards	Best Original Score	Alberto Iglesias	Won	
2007	21st Goya Awards	Best Supporting Actress	Carmen Maura	Won	
2007	21st Goya Awards	Best Supporting Actress	Lola Dueñas	Nominated	
2007	21st Goya Awards	Best Supporting Actress	Blanca Portillo	Nominated	
2007	21st Goya Awards	Best Cinematography	José Luis Alcaine	Nominated	
2007	21st Goya Awards	Best Costume Design	Sabine Daigeler	Nominated	
2007	21st Goya Awards	Best Make-Up and Hairstyles	Massimo Gattabrusi and Ana Lozano	Nominated	
2007	21st Goya Awards	Best Art Direction	Salvador Parra	Nominated	
2007	21st Goya Awards	Best Production Supervision	Toni Novella	Nominated	
2007	21st Goya Awards	Best Sound		Nominated	
2007	13th Screen Actors Guild Awards	Best Actress	Penélope Cruz	Nominated	
2007	60th British Academy Film Awards	Best Actress	Penélope Cruz	Nominated	
2007	60th British Academy Film Awards	Best Foreign Language Film		Nominated	
2007	16th Actors and Actresses Union Awards	Best Film Actress in a Leading Role	Penélope Cruz	Won	
2007	16th Actors and Actresses Union Awards	Best Film Actress in a Secondary Role	Blanca Portillo	Won	
2007	16th Actors and Actresses Union Awards	Best Film Actress in a Secondary Role	Lola Dueñas	Nominated	
2007	16th Actors and Actresses Union Awards	Best Film Actress in a Secondary Role	Carmen Maura	Nominated	
2007	16th Actors and Actresses Union Awards	Best Film Actress in a Minor Role	Chus Lampreave	Won	
2007	32nd César Awards	Best Foreign Film		Nominated	
2007	79th Academy Awards	Best Actress	Penélope Cruz	Nominated	
2007	12th Empire Awards	Best Actress	Penélope Cruz	Won	
2007	12th Forqué Awards	Best Film		Nominated	
2007	French Syndicate of Cinema Critics Awards	Best Foreign Film		Won	

== See also ==
- List of submissions to the 79th Academy Awards for Best Foreign Language Film
- List of Spanish submissions for the Academy Award for Best Foreign Language Film
- List of Spanish Academy Award winners and nominees for Best Lead Actress

Awards
Preceded by The Three Burials of Melquiades Estrada	Cannes Film Festival; Prix du scénario 2006	Succeeded by The Edge of Heaven
