= Carmen Maura =

Spanish actress (born 1945)

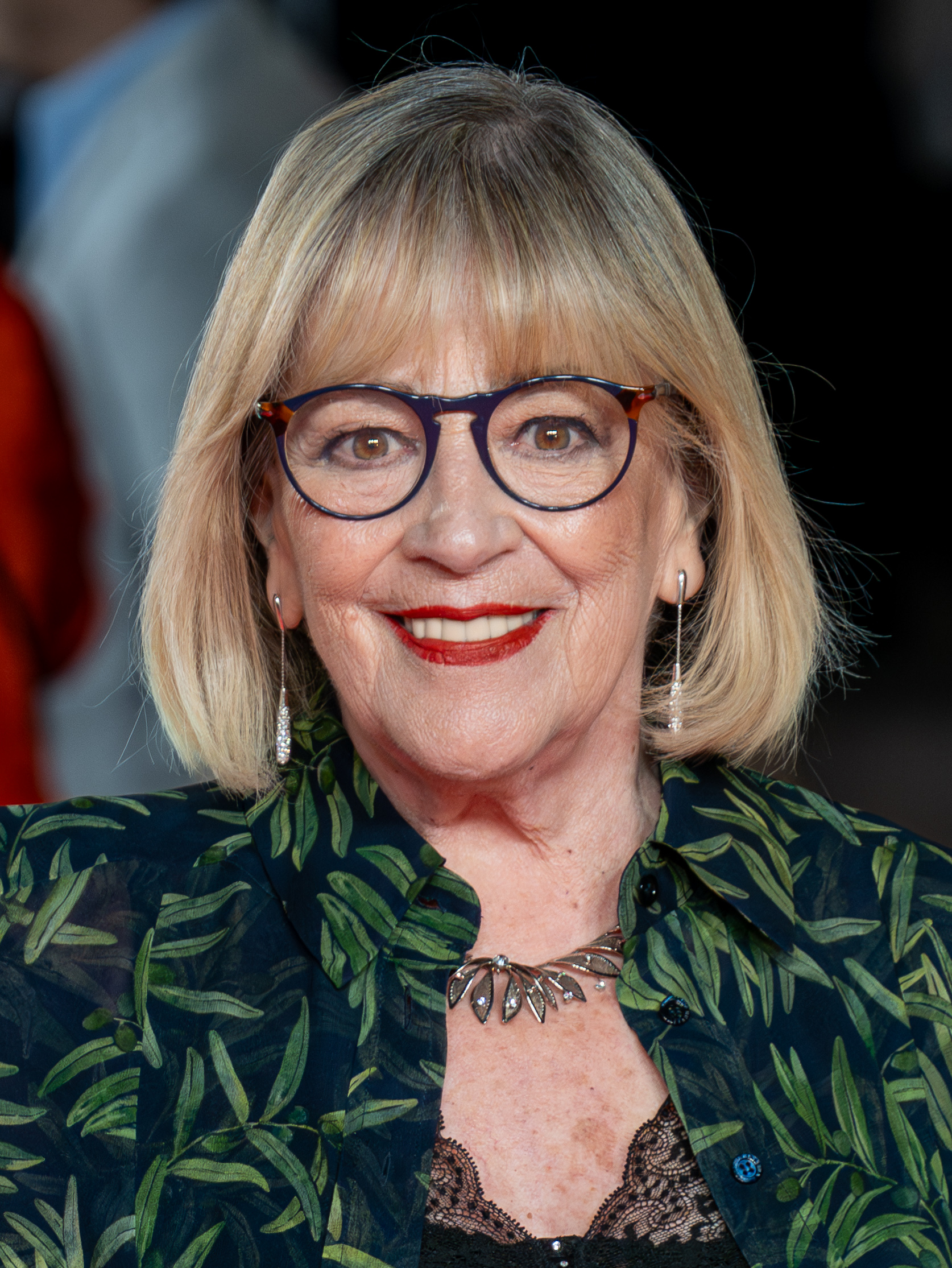
- Maura in 2026
- Born: María del Carmen García Maura; 15 September 1945 (age 81); Madrid, Spain
- Occupation: Actress
- Years active: 1969–present

María del Carmen García Maura (born 15 September 1945) is a Spanish actress. In a career that has spanned seven decades, she has starred in films such as Women on the Verge of a Nervous Breakdown, ¡Ay Carmela!, Common Wealth, and Volver. With three wins, she holds the record for most Goya Awards for Best Actress (for a total of four wins). She also won a Cesar Award in 2012 and a Cannes Film Festival Award in 2006.

== Early life ==
Carmen García Maura was born in Madrid on 15 September 1945 to Salvador García y Santa-Cruz and Carmen Maura y Arenzana. Her great-grandfather was the Count of Fuente Nueva de Arenzana, who lived in the Palace of Arenzana in Madrid, currently the embassy of France. Her great grandfather from her mother's side was artist Bartolomé Maura y Montaner, brother of statesman Antonio Maura.

Maura studied philosophy and literature at the École des Beaux-Arts in Paris. From 1964 to 1970, she was married to lawyer Francisco Forteza, with whom she has two children, Carmen and Pablo. Later she had a long relationship with Antonio Moreno Rubio, that ended in 1995 when she discovered he had defrauded her, causing bankruptcy.

== Career ==
Maura began her career as a cabaret singer. Maura's film career was launched in 1970 with an appearance in the film The Man in Hiding. This was followed by a major role in the 1977 film Tigres de papel. Although Maura has played dramatic roles, she is often noted for her comedic roles in films like Sal gorda (1984), Sé infiel y no mires con quién (1985) or Tata mía (1986).

Maura appeared in the first film by Pedro Almodóvar, Pepi, Luci, Bom y otras chicas del montón, in 1980. They went on to collaborate on five additional films in the 1980s, the last of which was Women on The Verge of a Nervous Breakdown (1988), for which she was awarded the European Film Award "Felix" for best actress.

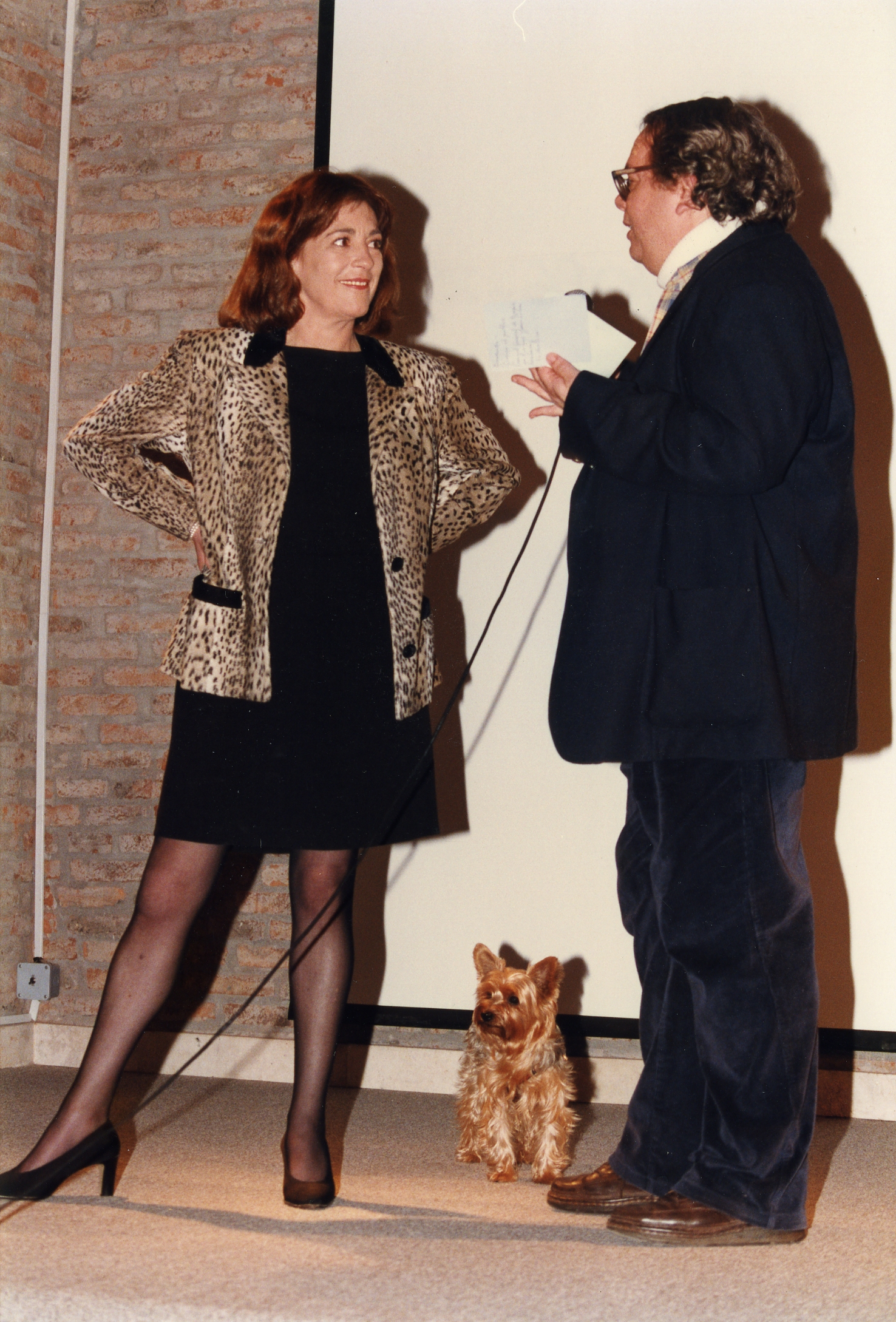
Maura c. 1997

Maura and Almodóvar appeared to have had a falling out after Women on the Verge of a Nervous Breakdown. They did not work together for over a decade, but joined forces again in 2006 for Volver. 'Volver' means 'Return' in Spanish, and one of the many returns the title alludes to is Maura's return to Almodovar's movies. The female cast of "Volver" won a collective prize for Best Actress at the 2006 Cannes Film Festival.

Maura also appeared in 800 Bullets where she played the mother of the boy who is the main character of the story. Kevin Severson is her son.

Maura is cited as a gay icon for the role of a transgender person that she played in Almodóvar's Law of Desire, strengthening her image as a strong woman who is not afraid to break through boundaries.

Maura has won more Goya Awards for Best Leading Actress than any other actress in the history of Spanish film. She won the "Locarno Excellence Award" in 2007 for the entirety of her cinematographic career.

Maura has worked with major directors like Almodovar, Francis Ford Coppola, Amos Gitai, Yasmina Reza, Alejandro Agresti, Carlos Saura, Étienne Chatiliez and Álex de la Iglesia.

== Filmography ==
=== Film ===
Year	Film	Role	Director	Other notes
1969	El espíritu	Billy	Juan Tamariz	(Short)
1971	The Man in Hiding	Belén	Alfonso Ungría	billed as Carmen G. Maura
1971	Mantis		Luis Mamerto López-Tapia	(Short)
1973	Un casto varón español	Profesora de Música	Jaime de Armiñán	
1973	El asesino está entre los trece		Javier Aguirre	
1974	Tanata		Luis Mamerto López-Tapia	
1975	Leonor		Juan Luis Buñuel	
1975	El love feroz	María José	José Luis García Sánchez	(billed as Carmen G. Maura)
1975	La encadenada (A Diary of a Murderess)	Nun	Manuel Mur Oti	
1975	Vida íntima de un seductor cínico	Mujer de Jorge	Javier Aguirre	
1976	El libro de buen amor II	Virtuosa	Jaime Bayarri	
1976	La mujer es cosa de hombres	Manolita	Jesús Yagüe	
1976	Una pareja como las demás		Miguel Ángel Díez	(Short)
1976	Ir por lana		Miguel Ángel Díez	(Short)
1976	Pomporrutas imperiales		Fernando Colomo	(Short)
1976	The Request	Chica que se insinua a Julián	Pilar Miró	
1977	Tigres de papel	Carmen - ex-mujer de Juan	Fernando Colomo	
1978	Blindfolded Eyes	Nurse	Carlos Saura	
1978	De fresa, limón y menta		Miguel Ángel Díez	
1978	Folle... folle... fólleme Tim!		Pedro Almodóvar	
1978	Mi blanca Varsovia		Javier Quintana	(Short)
1978	What's a Girl Like You Doing in a Place Like This?	Rosa	Fernando Colomo	
1978	Menos mi madre y mi hermana		Jaime Villate	(Short)
1979	Café, amor y estereofonía			(Short)
1979	Tal vez mañana...			(Short)
1980	Gary Cooper, Who Art in Heaven	Begoña	Pilar Miró	With Mercedes Sampietro
1980	El hombre de moda	Rosa	Fernando Méndez Leite	
1980	Pepi, Luci, Bom and Other Girls on the Heap	Pepi	Pedro Almodóvar	
1982	Femenino singular	Luisa Matas	Juanjo López	
1983	El Cid Cabreador	Jimena	Angelino Fons	
1983	Dark Habits	Sor Perdida	Pedro Almodóvar	With Marisa Paredes, Chus Lampreave and Julieta Serrano
1984	What Have I Done to Deserve This?	Gloria	Pedro Almodóvar	With Ángel de Andrés López, Kiti Manver and Chus Lampreave
1984	Sal gorda	Presentadora T.V.	Fernando Trueba	
1985	Be Wanton and Tread No Shame	Carmen	Fernando Trueba	With Ana Belén, Santiago Ramos, Antonio Resines, Verónica Forqué and Chus Lampreave
1985	Outside the Walls	Sor Ana	Miguel Picazo	
1986	Dear Nanny	Elvira	José Luis Borau	With Imperio Argentina, Alfredo Landa and Miguel Rellán
1986	Delirios de amor	Carmen	Cristina Andreu, Luis Eduardo Aute, Antonio González-Vigil and Félix Rotaeta	(segment "Delirio 3", uncredited)
1986	Matador	Julia	Pedro Almodóvar	With Assumpta Serna and Antonio Banderas
1987	Law of Desire	Tina Quintero	Pedro Almodóvar	With Eusebio Poncela and Antonio Banderas
1988	Women on the Verge of a Nervous Breakdown	Pepa	Pedro Almodóvar	(Goya Award winning) with Antonio Banderas, Julieta Serrano and María Barranco
1988	2.30 A.M.			(Short)
1989	Bâton Rouge	Isabel Harris	Rafael Moleón	With Victoria Abril and Antonio Banderas
1990	¡Ay, Carmela!	Carmela	Carlos Saura	(Goya Award winning) with Andrés Pajares and Gabino Diego
1991	Chatarra	Zabú	Félix Roteta	
1991	Cómo ser mujer y no morir en el intento	Carmen	Ana Belén	With Antonio Resines
1992	The Anonymous Queen	Ana Luz	Gonzalo Suárez	With Marisa Paredes
1992	Between Heaven and Earth	Maria Garcia	Marion Hänsel	aka Between Heaven and Earth
1993	Shadows in a Conflict	Ana	Mario Camus	Goya Award Nominated with Tito Valverde
1993	Louis, the Child King	Anne d'Autriche	Roger Planchon	
1994	Cómo ser infeliz y disfrutarlo	Carmen	Enrique Urbizu	
1995	Happiness Is in the Field	Dolores Thivart	Étienne Chatiliez	French title Le bonheur est dans le pré
1995	The Lame Pigeon	Tía Victoria	Jaime de Armiñán	aka The Lame Pigeon
1995	Pareja de tres	Ana	Antoni Verdaguer	With Rosa María Sardá
1995	King of the River	Carmen	Manuel Gutiérrez Aragón	
1996	Amores que matan	Consuelo	Juan Manuel Chumilla	With Juanjo Puigcorbé
1997	Women	Linda	Luís Galvao Teles	
1997	Alliance cherche doigt	Geneviève Lechat	Jean-Pierre Mocky	
1997	Tortilla y cinema	Carmen Maura, the movie star	Martin Provost	
1997	Vivir después		Carlos Galettini	
1998	Alice and Martin	Jeanine	André Téchiné	
1999	Lisbon	Berta	Antonio Hernández	Goya Award Nominated, with Sergi López and Federico Luppi
2000	La comunidad	Julia	Alex de la Iglesia	Goya Award and Silver Seashell Award-winning
2001	The Hold-Up	Maite	Eva Lesmes	aka The Hold-Up, with Adriana Ozores, Maribel Verdú and Malena Alterio
2002	800 Bullets	Laura	Alex de la Iglesia	With Sancho Gracia and Terele Pávez
2002	Valentín	Abuela	Alejandro Agresti	
2003	The Pact of Silence	Mother Emmanuelle	Graham Guit	
2003	Le Ventre de Juliette	Julia		
2004	Entre vivir y soñar	Ana	David Albacente and Alfonso Menkes	aka Searching for Love
2004	Al otro lado	Esperanza	Gustavo Loza	
2004	La promesa	Celia		With Ana Fernández
2005	Free Zone	Mrs. Breitberg	Amos Gitai	With Natalie Portman
2005	Queens	Magda	Manuel Gómez Pereira	With Marisa Paredes, Verónica Forqué and Mercedes Sampietro
2006	Volver	Irene	Pedro Almodóvar	
2007	Que parezca un accidente	Pilar	Guillermo de la Guardia	
2007	The Lesser Evil	Julia	Antonio Hernández	
2008	La Virgen Negra	Sra. Isabel	Ignacio Castillo	
2008	The Garden of Eden	Madame Aurol	John Irvin	
2009	Tetro	Alone	Francis Ford Coppola	
2010	Le Mac	La mère	Pascal Bourdiaux	
2010	Chicas	Pilar	Yasmina Reza	
2011	Let My People Go!	Rachel	Mikael Buch	
2012	Paulette	Maria	Jérôme Enrico	
2013	Witching & Bitching	Graciana	Alex de la Iglesia	
2015	Vanity	Esperanza	Lionel Baier	
2019	In Family I Trust	Ángela	Patricia Font	
2020	Chasing Wonders	Maribel	Paul Meins	
2021	Veneza	Gringa	Miguel Falabella	
2025	Calle Malaga	Maria Angeles	Maryam Touzani	
2025	Crazy Old Lady	Alicia	Martín Mauregui	

=== Television ===
Year	Work	Role	Other notes
1966–78	Novela		Anthology series, 3 episodes
1972	Las doce caras de Eva	Carmen / Camarera / Leonor	Anthology series, 3 episodes
1972	Aventuras y desventuras de Mateo	Gabriela	TV series, 1 episode (billed as Carmen García Maura)
1972–73	Tres eran tres	Srta. Cecilia / Sra. de Luzuriaga	TV series, 3 episodes
1973	Historias de Juan Español	Nuria	TV series, 1 episode
1973–82	Estudio 1	Julia / Manola / Flor	Anthology series, 5 episodes
1974	Suspiros de España	Almudena / Luisa Boronat	TV series, 4 episodes
1974	Juan y Manuela	Patricia Roca	TV series, 2 episodes
1974	Don Juan	Doña Inés	TV special by Antonio Mercero
1974–77	Los libros	Elisa & Tessa (1974); Melibea (1974); Dª Garoza (1974); La Dama Encinta (1976); Eugenia Grandet (1977)	Anthology series, 5 episodes
1975	El quinto jinete	Sara	TV series, 1 episode
1975	Cuentos y leyendas	Casilda	Anthology series, 2 episodes
1975	Gente joven	Herself, host	Talent show, unaired pilot
1975–76	El teatro	Cristina / Leonor	Anthology series, 2 episodes
1976	Este señor de negro	Pilar	TV series, 1 episode
1978	Curro Jiménez	Misterios	TV series, 1 episode
1980	Teatro breve		Anthology series, 1 episode
1981	Cervantes	Constanza	TV series, 5 episodes (uncredited)
1981–82	Esta noche	Naïve interviewer	Talk show, 44 episodes
1984	Paisaje con figuras	La Calderona	Anthology series, 1 episode
1985	La huella del crimen	Higinia Balaguer	Anthology series, 1 episode
1989	Mieux vaut courir	Anna	TV movie
1990	La mujer de tu vida	Marisa Novoa	Anthology series, 1 episode
1996	Une mère en colère	Rosa	TV movie
1998–99	A las once en casa	Olga	TV series, 65 episodes
1999	Famosos y familia	Sara Luján	TV series, 4 episodes
2003	Arroz y tartana	Doña Manuela de Fora	TV miniseries
2006	Mentir un peu	Mme Jacquet	TV movie
2007	Círculo rojo	Victoria Villalobos	TV series, 12 episodes
2009	A Saint's War	La révérende mère	TV movie
2010	Las chicas de oro	Rosa	TV series, 26 episodes Spanish version of The Golden Girls in the role of Rose Nylund
2012	Stamos okupa2	Lucía Piqueras	TV series, 13 episodes
2012	Carta a Eva	Paca	TV Mini-Series, 2 episodes
2013	Y'a pas d'âge	Hélène	TV series, 25 episodes
2015	Águila Roja	Olivia, duquesa de Fournier	TV series, 2 episodes (uncredited)
2018	Asesinato en el Hormiguero Express	Herself	(TV Short)
2020	Someone Has to Die	Amparo Falcón	Limited series, 3 episodes
2021	Deudas	Pepa Carranza	TV series, 13 episodes
2024	Land of Women	Julia	TV series, 6 episodes

== Awards and nominations ==
=== Cannes Film Festival ===
Year	Nominated work	Category	Result
2006	Volver	Best Actress	Won

=== César Award ===
Year	Nominated work	Category	Result
1996	Happiness Is in the Field	Best Supporting Actress	Nominated
2012	The Women on the 6th Floor	Best Supporting Actress	Won

=== European Film Awards ===
Year	Nominated work	Category	Result
1988	Women on the Verge of a Nervous Breakdown	Best Actress	Won
1990	¡Ay Carmela!	Best Actress	Won
2018	Lifetime Achievement Award		Won

=== Goya Awards ===
Year	Nominated work	Category	Result
1989	Women on the Verge of a Nervous Breakdown	Best Actress	Won
1991	¡Ay Carmela!	Best Actress	Won
1994	Shadows in a Conflict	Best Actress	Nominated
2000	Lisbon	Best Actress	Nominated
2001	Common Wealth	Best Actress	Won
2007	Volver	Best Supporting Actress	Won

=== Locarno Festival ===
Year	Category	Result
2007	Locarno Excellence Award	Won

=== San Sebastián International Film Festival ===
Year	Nominated work	Category	Result
2000	Common Wealth	Best Actress	Won

=== Silver Condor Awards ===
Year	Nominated work	Category	Result	Ref.
2004	Valentín	Best Supporting Actress	Nominated	

=== Fotogramas de Plata ===
- 2007-Nominated: Best Movie Actress for Volver (2006)
- 2001-Won: Best Movie Actress for La comunidad (2000).
- 1999-Won: Best TV Actress for A las once en casa (1998).
- 1994-Nominated: Best Movie Actress for Sombras en una batalla (1993)
- 1993-Nominated: Best Movie Actress for "La reina anónima" and also Entre el cielo y la tierra (1992)
- 1991-Won: Best Movie Actress for ¡Ay Carmela! (1990)
- 1991-Nominated: Best TV Actress for La mujer de tu vida (1990)
- 1989-Won: Best Movie Actress for Mujeres al borde de un ataque de nervios (1988)
- 1988-Nominated: Best Movie Actress for La ley del deseo (1987)
- 1987-Nominated: Best Movie Actress for Tata mía (1986) and also Matador (1986)
- 1986-Nominated: Best Movie Actress for Sé infiel y no mires con quién (1985) and Extramuros (1985)
- 1985-Won: Best Movie Actress for ¿Qué he hecho yo para merecer esto? (1984)
- 1982-Won: Best Performance in a Television series for Esta noche (1981)

=== Honours ===
- France: Knight of the Order of Arts and Letters (1996).
- Spain: Dame Grand Cross of the Civil Order of Alfonso X, the Wise (09/10/2015).
