= Don Juan (1974 TV film) =

1974 Spanish comedy television special by Televisión Española

- Genre: Comedy
- Based on: Don Juan Tenorio by José Zorrilla
- Written by: Juan Farias; Lola Salvador
- Directed by: Antonio Mercero
- Composer: Adolfo Waitzman
- Country of origin: Spain
- Original language: Spanish

Production
- Cinematography: Cecilio Paniagua
- Running time: 30 min.
- Production company: Televisión Española

Original release
- Network: Primera Cadena
- Release: 1 June 1974

Don Juan is a 1974 Spanish comedy television special by Televisión Española, directed by Antonio Mercero, written by Juan Farias and Lola Salvador, with music by Adolfo Waitzman. It first aired on 1 June 1974 on Televisión Española's Primera Cadena. It won the Rose d'Or award and a Special Mention from the Press at the 1974 Montreaux Festival. It was also nominated for an International Emmy Award that same year.

== Plot ==
A television director with little experience appears with his entire crew to face the casting for his version of José Zorrilla's Don Juan Tenorio. However, all kinds of mishaps happen throughout the process.

== Cast ==
- Pedro Osinaga as Don Juan
- Ágata Lys as Doña Inés
- Pepe Martín as Don Juan
- Carmen Maura as Doña Inés
- Antonio Medina as Don Juan
- María Garralón as Doña Inés
- José Vidal as Don Juan
- Francisco Cecilio as Director
- Luis Ciges
- Ketty de la Cámara
- Andrés Mejuto
- Emilio Mellado
- Mari Luz Olier
- Willy Rubio

== Accolades ==
Year	Festival	Award	Result	Ref.
1974	Montreaux Festival	Rose d'Or	Won	
1974	International Emmy Award		Nominated	
