= Baton Rouge (1988 film) =

- Theatrical release poster
- Directed by: Rafael Moleón
- Screenplay by: Agustín Díaz Yanes; Rafael Moleón
- Story by: Agustín Díaz Yanes
- Produced by: Eduardo Campoy; Edmundo Gil
- Starring: Victoria Abril; Antonio Banderas; Carmen Maura
- Cinematography: Ángel Luis Fernández
- Edited by: José Salcedo
- Music by: Bernardo Bonezzi
- Production company: Modigil
- Release dates: September 1988 (Zinemaldia); 10 October 1988 (Spain)
- Country: Spain
- Language: Spanish

Baton Rouge is a 1988 Spanish neo-noir thriller film directed by Rafael Moleón Gavilanes, which stars Carmen Maura, Victoria Abril, and Antonio Banderas.

== Plot ==
A wealthy woman Isabel Harris is blackmailed by cold psychiatrist Ana Alonso and the gold-digging gigolo Antonio, who team up to frame Isabel in a crime.

== Cast ==
- Victoria Abril as Ana Alonso
- Carmen Maura as Isabel Harris
- Antonio Banderas as Antonio
- Laura Cepeda
- Ángel de Andrés López
- Noel Molina
- Aldo Grilo
- Rafael Díaz
- Pedro Díez del Corral
- Paco Guijar

== Release ==
It was released in Spanish theatres on 10 October 1988.

== Reception ==
Octavi Martí's review in El País reproached Moleón for privileging the mathematical nature of the plot, "devouring everything, characters included, to the point of [Moleón] filming absurd sequences". He did, however, praise convincing performances from the actors.

== Accolades ==
Year	Award	Category	Nominee(s)	Result	Ref.
1989	3rd Goya Awards	Best Original Screenplay	Agustín Díaz Yanes, Rafael Monleón	Nominated	
1989	3rd Goya Awards	Best Actress	Victoria Abril	Nominated	
1989	3rd Goya Awards	Best Supporting Actress	Laura Cepeda	Nominated	
1989	3rd Goya Awards	Best Supporting Actor	Ángel de Andrés López	Nominated	
1989	3rd Goya Awards	Best Editing	José Salcedo	Nominated	

== See also ==
- List of Spanish films of 1988
