= Winter Diary =

- Theatrical release poster
- Spanish: Diario de invierno
- Directed by: Francisco Regueiro
- Screenplay by: Ángel Fernández Santos; Francisco Regueiro
- Starring: Fernando Rey; Eusebio Poncela; Francisco Algora; Terele Pávez; Rosario Flores; Lilí Murati; Victoria Peña
- Cinematography: Juan Amorós
- Edited by: Pedro del Rey
- Production company: Castor Films
- Distributed by: United International Pictures
- Release dates: 18 September 1988 (Zinemaldia); 29 September 1988 (Spain)
- Country: Spain
- Language: Spanish

Winter Diary (Spanish: Diario de invierno) is a 1988 Spanish film directed by Francisco Regueiro which stars Fernando Rey and Eusebio Poncela in a father-son relation alongside Francisco Algora, Terele Pávez, Rosario Flores, Lilí Murati, and Victoria Peña.

== Plot ==
The plot tracks a policy agent seeking evidence for the criminal activities of his father, a former healer who practices euthanasia to people in need of relief.

== Cast ==
- Fernando Rey as Padre
- Eusebio Poncela as León
- Francisco Algora as Culebrero
- Terele Pávez as Madre
- Rosario Flores as Muda
- Lilí Murati as Abuela
- Victoria Peña as Gloria

== Release ==
The film was presented in September 1988 at the 36th San Sebastián International Film Festival. It was theatrically released on 29 September 1988.

== Reception ==
Octavi Martí of El País wrote that Winter Diary is "an extremely ambitious and risky film, which produces a strange sensation of lack of footage".

The review in Fotogramas rated the film 3 out of 5 stars, deeming it to be "an attractive film displaying a hermeticism that ends up becoming excessive", underpinning a game with "puzzling but suggestive results".

== Accolades ==
| Year | Award | Category | Nominee(s) | Result | Ref. |
|---|---|---|---|---|---|
| 1988 | 36th San Sebastián International Film Festival | Silver Shell for Best Actor | Best Actor | Won | |
| 1989 | 3rd Goya Awards | Best Film | | Nominated | |
| 1989 | 3rd Goya Awards | Best Director | Francisco Regueiro | Nominated | |
| 1989 | 3rd Goya Awards | Best Actor | Fernando Rey | Won | |
| 1989 | 3rd Goya Awards | Best Supporting Actress | Terele Pávez | Nominated | |

== See also ==
- List of Spanish films of 1988
