= Rowing with the Wind =

- Directed by: Gonzalo Suárez
- Written by: Gonzalo Suárez
- Produced by: Andrés Vicente Gómez
- Starring: Hugh Grant; Lizzy McInnerny; Valentine Pelka; Elizabeth Hurley
- Cinematography: Carlos Suárez
- Edited by: José Salcedo
- Music by: Alejandro Massó
- Production company: Ditirambo Films
- Release date: 19 September 1988 (Zinemaldia)
- Running time: 96 minutes (Note: original theatrical cut)
- Country: Spain
- Language: English

Rowing with the Wind (Spanish: Remando al viento) is a 1988 Spanish film written and directed by Gonzalo Suárez. Concerning the English writer Mary Shelley and her circle, it stars Hugh Grant, Lizzy McInnerny, Valentine Pelka, and Elizabeth Hurley. It won six Goya Awards.

== Plot ==
In the summer of 1816, English poet Percy Shelley, his soon to be wife Mary Shelley (daughter of William Godwin and Mary Wollstonecraft), and Mary's stepsister and companion Claire Clairmont take a holiday with Lord Byron and his physician John William Polidori at a villa rented by Byron at Lake Leman, Switzerland.

Byron challenges each of the friends to write a horror story, and Mary begins her novel, Frankenstein. She imagines the monster becoming real, and for the next six years, as tragedy befalls those around her, she believes the creature of her imagination is the cause.

Meanwhile, Claire has Byron's baby, is estranged from him and barred from seeing her daughter. Byron and Percy continue their friendship, the one hedonistic, the other idealistic. The Shelleys move near Pisa.

== Cast ==
- Hugh Grant as Lord Byron
- Lizzy McInnerny as Mary Shelley
- Valentine Pelka as Percy Bysshe Shelley
- Elizabeth Hurley as Claire Clairmont
- José Luis Gómez as John Polidori
- Virginia Mataix as Elisa
- Ronan Vibert as Fletcher
- Aitana Sánchez-Gijón as Teresa Guiccioli
- Bibiana Fernández as Fornarina
- José María Pou
- José Carlos Rivas
- Kate McKenzie as Jane Williams
- Jolyon Baker

== Production ==
Shooting locations included the Borizu Beach (Asturias), Switzerland, and Venice.

== Reception ==
Ángel Fernández-Santos of El País declared Rowing with the Wind a "very ambitious film that almost always lives up to its ambition", falling short of being a masterpiece because of a lack of interest of a few scenes and because of the small presence of actress Lizzy McInnerny in the face of the "enormity of the tragic task that the film has in store" for her character.

== Accolades ==
Year	Award	Category	Nominee(s)	Result	Ref.
1988	San Sebastián International Film Festival	Silver Shell for Best Director	Gonzalo Suárez	Won	
1989	3rd Goya Awards	Best Film		Nominated	
1989	3rd Goya Awards	Best Director	Gonzalo Suárez	Won	
1989	3rd Goya Awards	Best Original Screenplay	Gonzalo Suárez	Nominated	
1989	3rd Goya Awards	Best Supporting Actor	José Luis Gómez	Nominated	
1989	3rd Goya Awards	Best Cinematography	Carlos Suárez	Won	
1989	3rd Goya Awards	Best Editing	José Salcedo	Nominated	
1989	3rd Goya Awards	Goya Award for Best Original Score	Alejandro Massó	Nominated	
1989	3rd Goya Awards	Best Production Supervision	José G. Jacoste	Won	
1989	3rd Goya Awards	Best Art Direction	Wolfgang Burmann	Won	
1989	3rd Goya Awards	Best Costume Design	Yvonne Blake	Won	
1989	3rd Goya Awards	Best Makeup and Hairstyles	Romana González, Josefa Morales	Won	
1989	3rd Goya Awards	Best Sound	Daniel Goldstein, Ricardo Steinberg	Nominated	
1989	3rd Goya Awards	Best Special Effects	Reyes Abades	Nominated	

== See also ==
- List of Spanish films of 1988
