= Lisbon (1999 film) =

- Theatrical release poster
- Spanish: Lisboa
- Directed by: Antonio Hernández
- Screenplay by: Antonio Hernández; Enrique Brasó
- Starring: Carmen Maura; Federico Luppi; Sergi López; Laia Marull
- Cinematography: Aitor Mantxola
- Edited by: Santiago Ricci
- Music by: Víctor Reyes
- Production companies: Blue Legend; Alta Films; GRPC; EPC; Sinfonía Otoñal
- Distributed by: Alta Films (es)
- Release dates: 29 April 1999 (Argentina); 23 July 1999 (Spain)
- Running time: 100 minutes
- Countries: Spain; Argentina
- Language: Spanish

Lisbon (Spanish: Lisboa) is a 1999 Argentine-Spanish thriller directed by Antonio Hernández which stars Carmen Maura, Federico Luppi, Sergi López, and Laia Marull.

== Synopsis ==
A travelling salesman picks up a middle-aged female hitchhiker on a deserted road on his way from Madrid to Lisbon. The woman doesn't say why she is going there or why she is carrying a gun. It soon emerges that her entire family is pursuing her, and their pursuit is certainly not out of love.

== Cast ==
- Sergi López as João
- Carmen Maura as Berta
- Federico Luppi as José Luis
- Antonio Birabent as Carlos
- Laia Marull as Verónica
- Saturnino García as Bruno
- Miguel Palenzuela as Aurelio

== Release ==
Distributed by Alta Films, it was theatrically released in Spain on 23 July 1999.

== Accolades ==
Year	Award	Category	Nominee(s)	Result	Ref.
2000	14th Goya Awards	Best Actress	Carmen Maura	Nominated	

== See also ==
- List of Spanish films of 1999
- List of Argentine films of 1999
