= José Sazatornil =

Spanish actor

- Born: José Sazatornil Buendía; 13 August 1925; Barcelona, Spain
- Died: 23 July 2015 (aged 89); Madrid, Spain
- Occupation: Actor
- Years active: 1946-2006
- Known for: Saza

José Sazatornil Buendía (13 August 1925 – 23 July 2015) was a Spanish actor who appeared in numerous films since making his debut in 1946.

== Biography ==
He was born in Barcelona on 13 August 1925. He was the son of the owner of a small shop in the city and studied in his native city, specifically at the Brothers of the Christian Doctrine School. Actor of great popularity, his career began in the theatre when he was thirteen years old. For seven years, according to his own words, was playing every Sunday a different work for months, and participated, in this way, in 280 comedies in seven years. Along these years, he combined his work in the theatres with his career as dependent on the family business.

In 1946 debuted at the Victoria Theatre in Barcelona, later he entered the theatrical Company of Paco Martínez Soria. He debuted in cinema by the hand of Javier Setó in a Spanish fantasy film in 1953, since then he participated in more than one hundred and ten films including La escopeta nacional directed by Luis García Berlanga, and Amanece, que no es poco directed by José Luis Cuerda.

In 1957, José Sazatornil founded his own Theatre Company. In 1974 he starred in his own television series: Los Maniáticos, by Fernando García de la Vega, in TVE. In 1989 he received the Goya Award for Best Supporting Actor for his role in the movie Espérame en el cielo by Antonio Mercero. During his long theatrical, filmic and television career he received numerous prizes and awards, and he became a popular and loved comedian actor.

In November 2013 was announced that he was suffering from Alzheimer's. He died of natural causes in Madrid on 23 July 2015, at the age of 89. One of his most remembered roles was his unforgettable interpretation of Don Mendo in the play \"La revenge on Don Mendo\", traditionally represented by the first figures on the Spanish national theatre, such as Fernando Fernán Gómez and Manolo Gómez Bur.

== Selected filmography ==
- The Louts (1954)
- The Sailor with Golden Fists (1968)
- Blood in the Bullring (1969)
- The Rebellious Novice (1971)
- English Striptease (1975)
- ...And Give Us Our Daily Sex (1979)
- Wait for Me in Heaven (1988)
- Amanece, que no es poco (1989)
