= Chus Lampreave =

Spanish actress

- Born: María Jesús Lampreave Pérez; 11 December 1930; Madrid, Spain
- Died: 4 April 2016 (aged 85); Almería, Spain
- Occupation: Actress
- Years active: 1958–2012
- Notable work: Volver; Belle Époque

María Jesús Lampreave Pérez (11 December 1930 – 4 April 2016), known professionally as Chus Lampreave, was a Spanish character actress who starred in more than 70 films. She is known internationally for her roles in films by Pedro Almodóvar.

== Career ==
Lampreave was born in Madrid. She planned on being a painter and studied at the Real Academia de Bellas Artes de San Fernando, after which she worked as an illustrator for the Aguilar publishing firm.

It had not been her intention to become an actress, but was discovered by Jaime de Armiñán and began appearing in films in 1959.

Her first work with Pedro Almodóvar was in Entre tinieblas (1983). In total, Lampreave appeared in eight of his films. Almodóvar is known for his recurring use of certain actresses; they are referred to as the "Almodóvar girls".

While Lampreave never played a leading role, she would come to be known as Spain's most popular supporting actress. She was known for playing old ladies, usually eccentric relatives, that sported extremely thick glasses. She was recognized for the humor and humanity she contributed to her characters.

Among Lampreave's last roles was as the face of three advertising campaigns for Campofrío embutido sausages.

== Personal life ==
Lampreave married in 1960. She had a son, who is a biologist, and a daughter who died in the 1990s after an illness.

She spent the last few years of her life away from the spotlight in Almería in the south of Spain. She died in 2016 the age of 85.

== Filmography ==
Year	Title	Role	Director	Notes
1959	El pisito	Adelina, secretary Don Manuel	Marco Ferreri	Uncredited
1960	El cochecito	Yolanda	Marco Ferreri	
1963	La becerrada	Chus	José María Forqué	
1963	Not on Your Life	A visitor	Luis García Berlanga	
1966	Les Combinards		Jean-Claude Roy	(scenes deleted)
1970	La Lola, dicen que no vive sola	Justa	Jaime de Armiñán	
1972	My Dearest Senorita	Niece Chus	Jaime de Armiñán	
1974	The Love of Captain Brando	Alcaldesa	Jaime de Armiñán	
1976	Colorín colorado	Austin	José Luis García Sánchez	
1977	El bengador Gusticiero y su pastelera madre	Rosalinda	Antonio Fraguas 'Forges'	
1977	Al fin solos, pero...	Chus	Antonio Giménez Rico	
1977	La guerra de papá	Loren	Antonio Mercero	
1977	Nunca es tarde	Manoli	Jaime de Armiñán	
1978	El monosabio	Clara	Ray Rivas	
1978	La escopeta nacional	Viti	Luis García Berlanga	
1980	El erótico enmascarado	Doña Gertrudis	Mariano Ozores	
1981	National Heritage	Viti	Luis García Berlanga	
1981	Cuentos para una escapada			
1982	Nacional III	Viti	Luis García Berlanga	
1983	Dark Habits	Sor Rata	Pedro Almodóvar	
1984	Epílogo	Flo-Flo	Gonzalo Suárez	
1984	Bajo en nicotina	Puri	Raúl Artigot	
1984	What Have I Done to Deserve This?	Grandmother	Pedro Almodóvar	
1984	El jardín secreto	María	Carlos Suárez	
1985	El rollo de septiembre	Doña Aurelia	Mariano Ozores	
1985	El elegido	Florita	Fernando Huertas	
1985	Sé infiel y no mires con quién	Adela Mora	Fernando Trueba	
1986	Lulú de noche	Pharmacy worker	Emilio Martínez-Lázaro	
1986	Matador	Pilar	Pedro Almodóvar	
1986	Year of Enlightment	Doña Tránsito	Fernando Trueba	
1987	La vida alegre	Vecina II	Fernando Colomo	
1987	El pecador impecable	Beni	Augusto Martínez Torres	
1987	Moros y cristianos	Antonia	Luis García Berlanga	
1988	Espérame en el cielo	Emilia	Antonio Mercero	
1988	Women on the Verge of a Nervous Breakdown	A concierge who is a Jehova's Witness	Pedro Almodóvar	
1988	Miss Caribe	Doña Petra	Fernando Colomo	
1989	Amanece, que no es poco	Mother of Álvarez	José Luis Cuerda	
1989	Bajarse al moro	Doña Antonia	Fernando Colomo	
1992	Belle Époque	Doña Asun	Fernando Trueba	
1993	Supernova	Avelina	Juan Miñón	
1993	Everyone Off to Jail	Chus	Luis García Berlanga	
1994	Casque bleu	Alicia's mother	Gérard Jugnot	
1994	Siete mil días juntos	Sofía	Fernando Fernán Gómez	
1995	The Flower of My Secret	Mother of Leo	Pedro Almodóvar	
1995	Así en el cielo como en la tierra	Doña Asunción	José Luis Cuerda	
1998	Mátame mucho	Josefa	José Ángel Bohollo	
1998	Torrente, el brazo tonto de la ley	Reme	Santiago Segura	
1998	Una pareja perfecta	Doña Cuca	Francesc Betriu	
2001	Torrente 2: Misión en Marbella	Reme	Santiago Segura	
2002	Talk to Her	Portera	Pedro Almodóvar	
2002	El florido pensil	Doña Pepa	Juan José Porto	
2003	Atraco a las 3... y media	Doña Vicenta	Raúl Marchand Sánchez	
2004	Di que sí	Mother of Víctor	Juan Calvo	
2006	Volver	Aunt Paula	Pedro Almodóvar	
2008	Chef's Special	Celia	Nacho G. Velilla	
2009	Broken Embraces	A concierge	Pedro Almodóvar	
2010	Mami Blue			
2012	The Artist and the Model	María	Fernando Trueba	
2014	Torrente 5: Operación Eurovegas	Reme	Santiago Segura	

== Television ==
- Lo+Plus (1997)
- Hermanas (1998)

== Awards ==
- Premio Goya (1992)
- Fotogramas de Plata (2005)
- Spanish Actors Union Awards (2006)
- Cannes Film Festival (2006): Best actress together with the rest of female cast of Volver

== List of awards and nominations ==
Cannes Film Festival

Year	Category	Movie	Result
2006	Best Actress	Volver	Won

Goya Awards

Year	Category	Movie	Result
2012	Best Supporting Actress	El artista y la modelo	Nominated
1995	Best Supporting Actress	The Flower of My Secret	Nominated
1992	Best Supporting Actress	Belle Époque	Won
1989	Best Supporting Actress	Bajarse al moro	Nominated
1988	Best Supporting Actress	Espérame en el cielo	Nominated
1986	Best Supporting Actress	El año de las luces	Nominated

Fotogramas de Plata

Year	Category	Movie	Result
2005	Live Career		Won
1993	Best TV Actress	¿De parte de quién?	Finalist (1st round)
1990	Best TV Actress	Eva y Adán, agencia matrimonial	Nominated
1988	Best cinema actress	Espérame en el cielo Miss Caribe; Mujeres al borde de un ataque de nervios	Nominated
1986	Best Cinema Actress	El año de las luces Lulú de noche Matador	Nominated
1984	Best Cinema Actress	¿Qué he hecho yo para merecer esto?	Nominated

Spanish Actors Union Awards

Year	Category	Movie	Result
2012	Best Supporting Actress	El artista y la modelo	Nominated
2008	Best Supporting Actress	Fuera de carta	Nominated
2006	Best Supporting Actress	Volver	Won
1995	Best Supporting Actress	The Flower of My Secret	Nominated

Awards by the Ministry of Culture

- Gold Medal of Merit in the Fine Arts, 2001
