= Francisco Algora =

Spanish actor

- Born: Francisco Javier Jiménez Algora; 7 December 1948; Madrid, Spain
- Died: 30 March 2016 (aged 67)
- Occupation: Actor
- Years active: 1972–2012

Francisco Javier Jiménez Algora (7 December 1948 – 30 March 2016) was a Spanish actor. He has appeared in more than 100 films and television shows between 1972 and 2012. He starred in the 1973 film Habla, mudita, which was entered into the 23rd Berlin International Film Festival. He died on 30 March 2016 from lung cancer at the age of 67.

== Selected filmography ==
- La cera virgen (1972)
- Soltero y padre en la vida (1972)
- Habla, mudita (1973)
- La banda de Jaider (1973)
- Tamaño natural (1974)
- Tocata y fuga de Lolita (1974)
- País, S.A. (1975)
- Yo soy Fulana de Tal (1975)
- Bruja, más que bruja (1976)
- La viuda andaluza (1976)
- Las delicias de los verdes años (1976)
- Nosotros que fuimos tan felices (1976)
- Foul Play (1977)
- La mujer de la tierra caliente (1978)
- Soldados (1978)
- Tiempos de constitución (1979)
- El gran atasco (1979)
- La insólita y gloria hazaña del cipote de Archidona (1979)
- Mi adúltero esposo (1979)
- El buscón (1979)
- Todos me llaman 'Gato' (1980)
- Los fieles sirvientes (1980)
- Kargus (1981)
- La colmena (1982)
- Fanny Strawhair (1984)
- Réquiem por un campesino español (1985)
- Tiempo de silencio (1986)
- Cara de acelga (1987)
- La guerra de los locos (1987)
- El Dorado (1988)
- Diario de invierno (Winter Journal) (1988)
- Xenia (1989)
- Tramontana (1991)
- El hombre de la nevera (1993)
- Sea of the Moon (Mar de luna) (1995)
- Matías, juez de línea (1996)
- Time of Happiness (El tiempo de la felicidad) (1994)
- Las ratas (1998)
- Barrio (1998)
- The Grandfather (1998)
- You're the One (una historia de entonces) (2000)
- Lázaro de Tormes (2001)
- La balsa de piedra (2002)
- Nos miran (2002)
- Story of a Kiss (2002)
- Tiovivo c. 1950 (2004)
- La vida perra de Juanita Narboni (2005)
- Two Same Rival Houses (dos rivales casi iguales) (2007)
- Sunday Light (Luz de domingo) (2007)
- Moon in a Bottle (La luna en botella) (2007)
- Un ajuste de cuentas (2009)

=== Television ===
- Always Theatre (Teatro de siempre) (9172)
- Hora once (1972)
- Romantic Fall (Otoño romántico) (1973)
- Novela (1973)
- Curro Jiménez (1976)
- Cervantes (1980)
- Fortunata y Jacinta (1980)
- El mayorazgto de Labraz (1983)
- Cosas de dos (1984)
- The King and Queen (El rey y la reina) (1986)
- Candel (1987)
- Primera función (1989)
- Morir para vivir (1989)
- Réquiem por Granada (1991)
- Don Quixite by Miguel de Cervantes (El Quijote de Miguel de Cervantes) (1991)
- Urban Chronicles (Crónicas urbanas) (1992)
- No sé bailar (1992)
- Villarriba y Villabajo (1994)
- Hospital Central (2000)
- Paraíso (Paradise) (2001)
- Amar en tiempos revueltos (2005)
