= El Dorado (1988 film) =

- DVD cover
- Directed by: Carlos Saura
- Written by: Carlos Saura
- Produced by: Andrés Vicente Gómez
- Starring: Omero Antonutti; Lambert Wilson; Inés Sastre; Eusebio Poncela
- Cinematography: Teodoro Escamilla
- Edited by: Pedro del Rey
- Music by: Alejandro Massó
- Production company: Iberoamericana
- Release date: 20 April 1988 (Spain)
- Running time: 149 minutes
- Country: Spain
- Language: Spanish
- Budget: $8 million

El Dorado is a 1988 Spanish film written and directed by Carlos Saura. It was entered into the 1988 Cannes Film Festival.

== Synopsis ==
The film is about an expedition down the Amazon and Orinoco rivers in 1560 by Spanish soldiers searching for the fabled city of gold, El Dorado. Taking some followers and family along on the journey, they descend into madness and battle the environment and each other.

== Cast ==
- Omero Antonutti as Lope de Aguirre
- Lambert Wilson as Pedro de Ursúa
- Eusebio Poncela as Guzmán
- Gabriela Roel as Inés
- Inés Sastre as Elvira
- José Sancho as La Bandera
- Patxi Bisquert as Pedrarías
- Francisco Algora as LLamoso
- Féodor Atkine as Montoya
- Abel Vitón as Henao
- Francisco Merino as Alonso Esteban
- Mariano González as Zalduendo
- Gladys Catania as Juana
- Alfredo Catania as Vargas
- Gustavo Rojas as Carrión

== Release ==
A two-hour version of the film was screened in New York at the Festival of Films from Spain on October 28, 1988, with around 30 minutes cut from the version screened at Cannes.
