= Women on the Verge of a Nervous Breakdown =

1988 film by Pedro Almodóvar

- Theatrical release poster
- Spanish: Mujeres al borde de un ataque de nervios
- Directed by: Pedro Almodóvar
- Written by: Pedro Almodóvar
- Produced by: Agustín Almodóvar
- Starring: Carmen Maura; Antonio Banderas; Julieta Serrano
- Cinematography: José Luis Alcaine
- Edited by: José Salcedo
- Music by: Bernardo Bonezzi
- Production companies: El Deseo; Laurenfilm
- Distributed by: Lauren Films
- Release date: 25 March 1988
- Running time: 89 minutes
- Country: Spain
- Language: Spanish
- Budget: $700,000
- Box office: P1.1 billion ($8 million) (Spain); $7.2 million (US and Canada)

Women on the Verge of a Nervous Breakdown (Spanish: Mujeres al borde de un ataque de nervios) is a 1988 Spanish absurdist dark comedy film written and directed by Pedro Almodóvar, starring Carmen Maura, Antonio Banderas and Julieta Serrano. The plot follows actress Pepa, who, after her lover Iván leaves without explanation, sets out to find the reason, and comes across an array of eccentric characters, including Iván's son from a previous relationship and her best friend Candela, who has been held captive by a Shiite terrorist cell.

The film brought Almodóvar to widespread international attention: it was nominated for the 1988 Academy Award for Best Foreign Language Film, and won five Goya Awards including Best Film and Best Actress in a Leading Role for Maura. It premiered at the 45th Venice International Film Festival and was released in Spain on 25 March 1988 and in the United States on 11 November 1988.

Women On The Verge Of A Nervous Breakdown received widespread acclaim from critics and audiences alike, and is often considered one of Almodóvar's best films and one of greatest Spanish movies of all time. A stage musical opened on Broadway in 2010, adapted by Jeffrey Lane with songs by David Yazbek.

== Title ==
The Spanish title refers to an ataque de nervios (attack of the nerves), inexactly translated into English as "nervous breakdown" (crisis nerviosa). Ataques de nervios are culture-bound psychological phenomena during which the individual, most often female, displays dramatic outpouring of negative emotions, bodily gestures, occasional falling to the ground, and fainting, often in response to receiving disturbing news or witnessing or participating in an upsetting event. Historically, this condition has been associated with hysteria and more recently in the scientific literature with post-traumatic stress and panic attacks.

== Plot ==
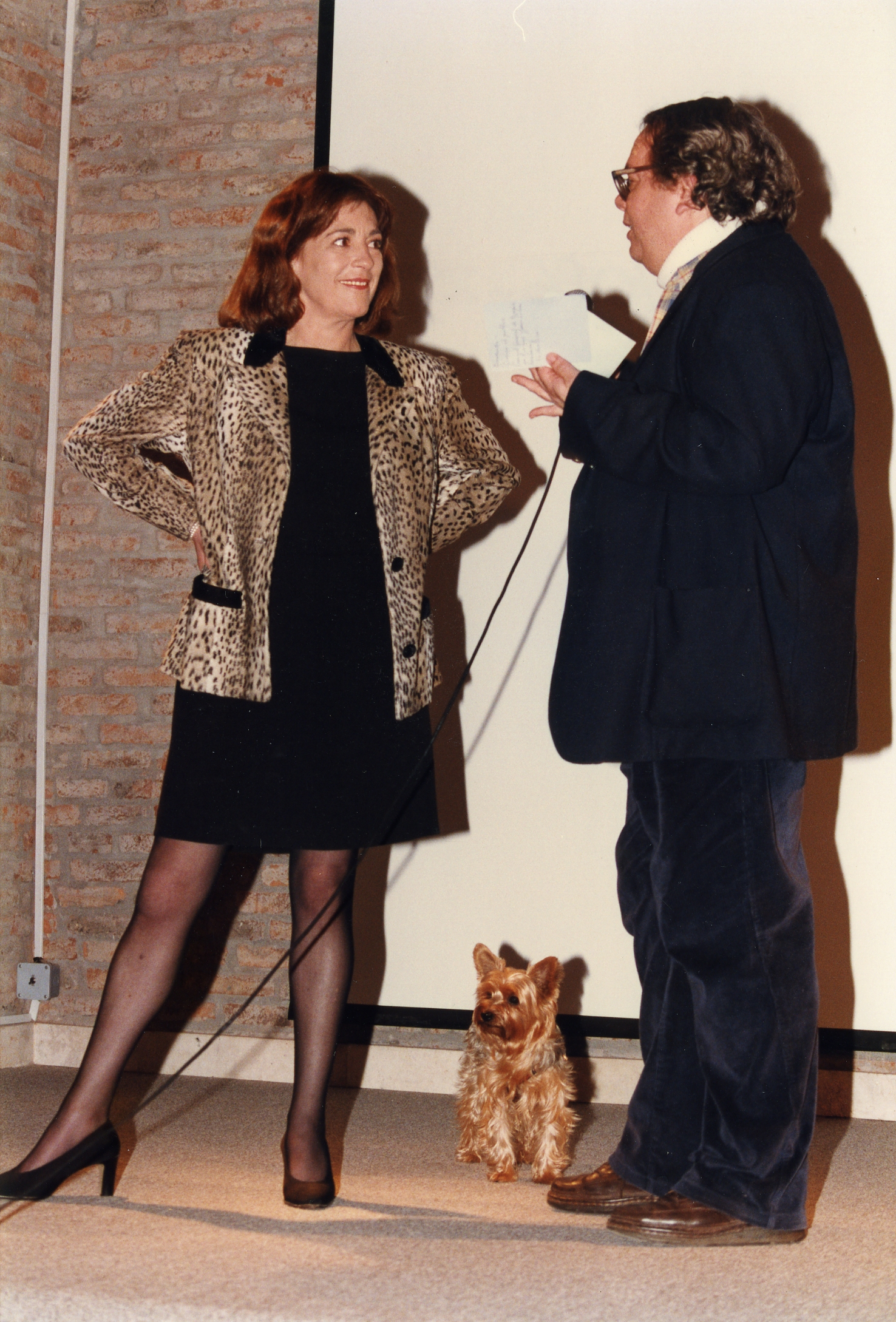
Carmen Maura (left) plays Pepa Marcos, who is depressed because her lover Iván has left her. She spends the day coping with emergencies and desperately trying to give him a message.

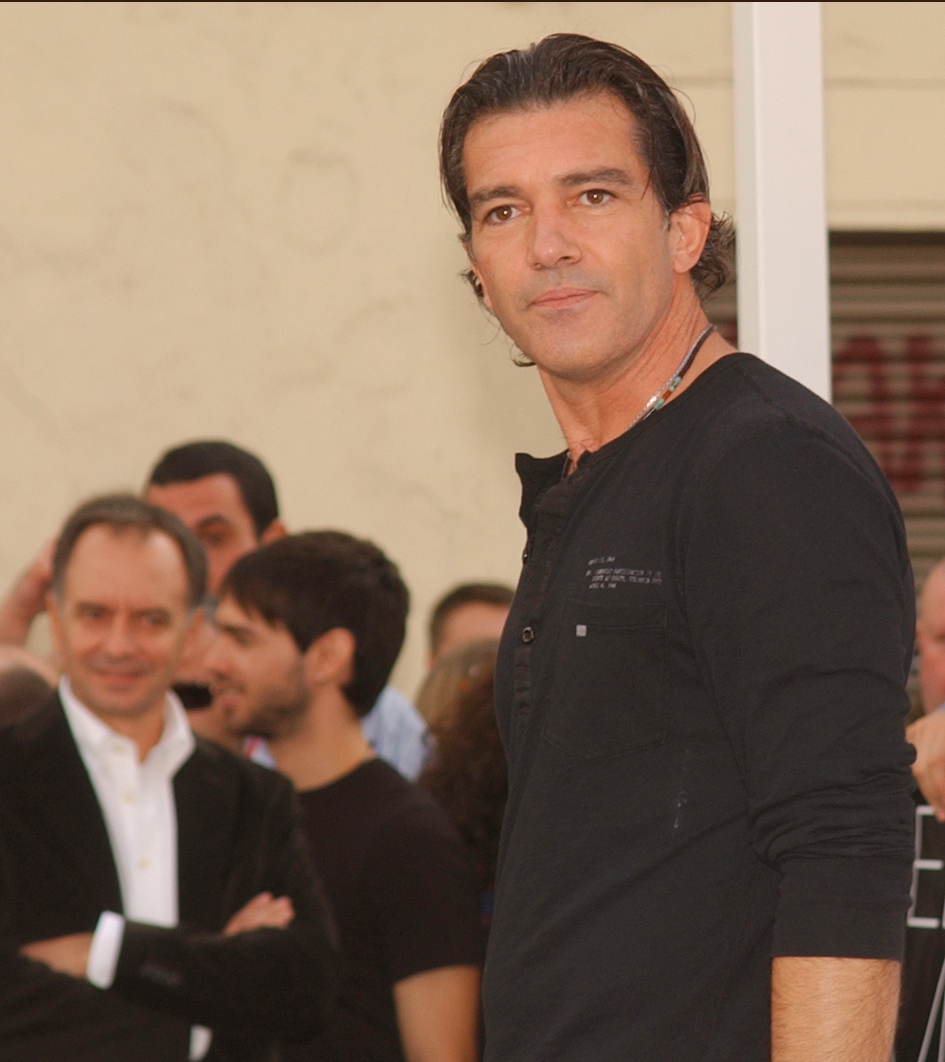
Antonio Banderas plays Carlos, Ivan’s son, who is engaged to Marisa but becomes attracted to Candela.

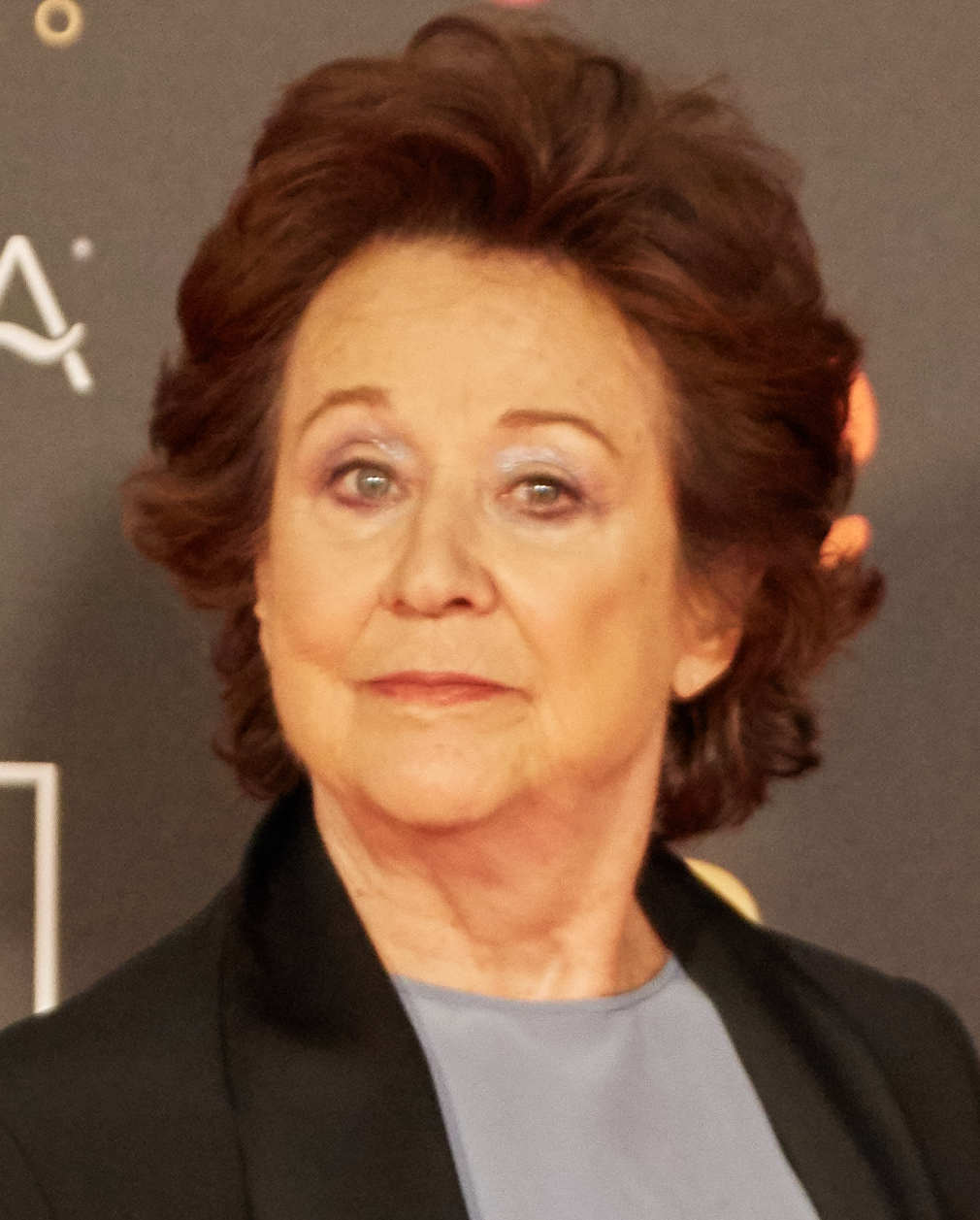
Julieta Serrano plays Lucía, Ivan’s ex-wife, recently released from a mental hospital, who is coming to confront Pepa at gunpoint and to kill Ivan.

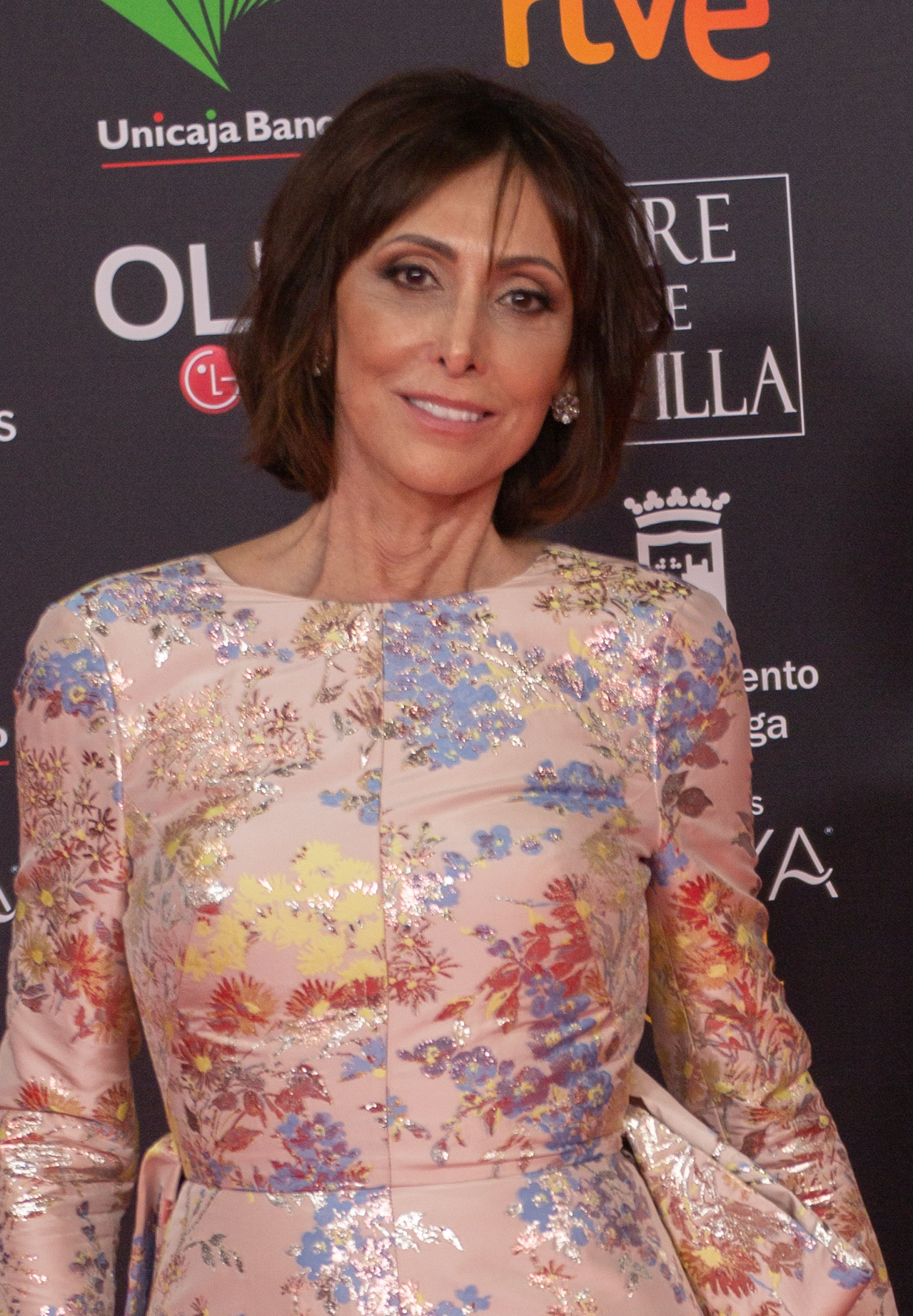
María Barranco plays Candela, who unknowingly had an affair with a Shiite terrorist.

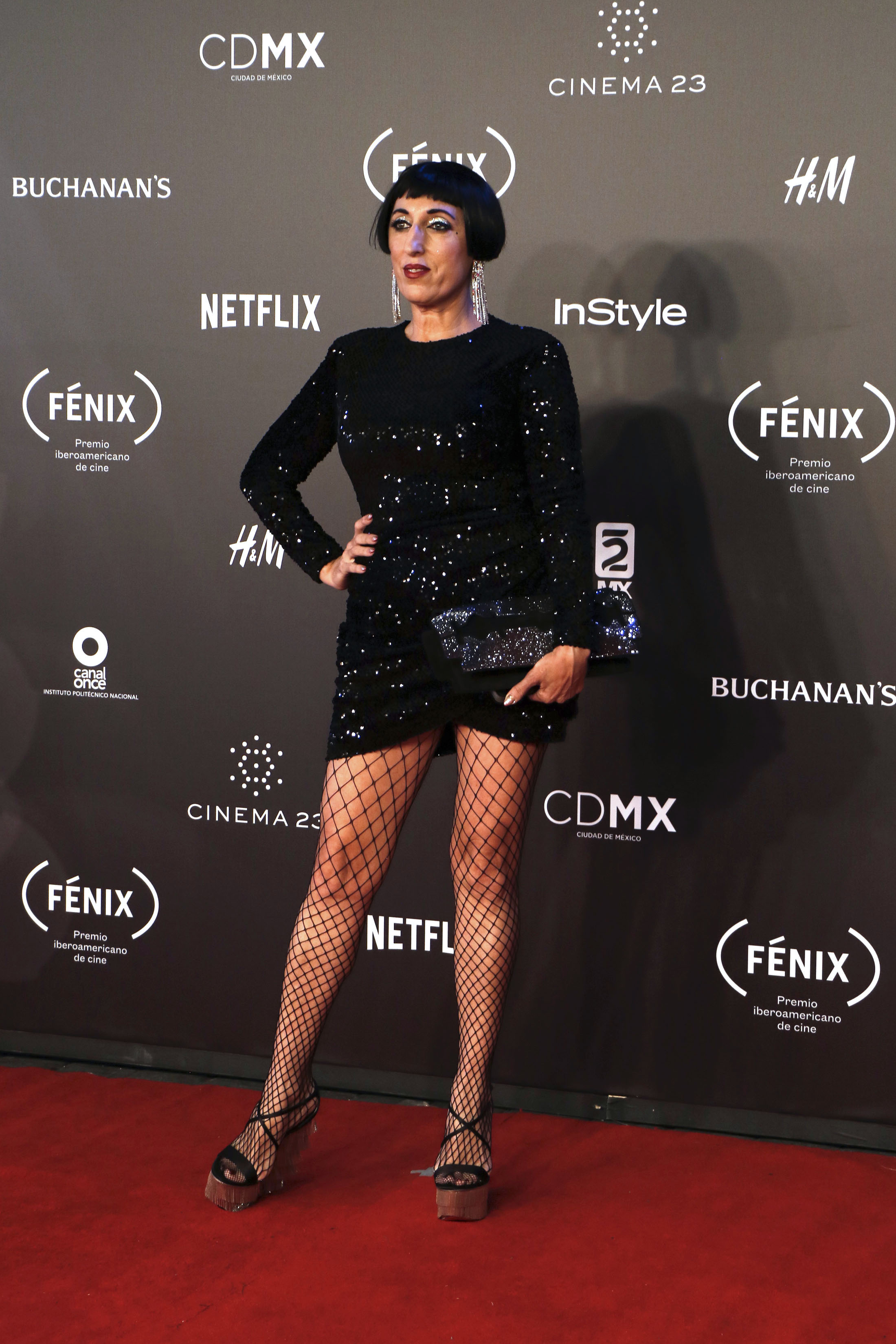
Rossy de Palma plays Marisa, Carlos’s pushy fiancée who helps herself to gazpacho, unaware it is spiked.

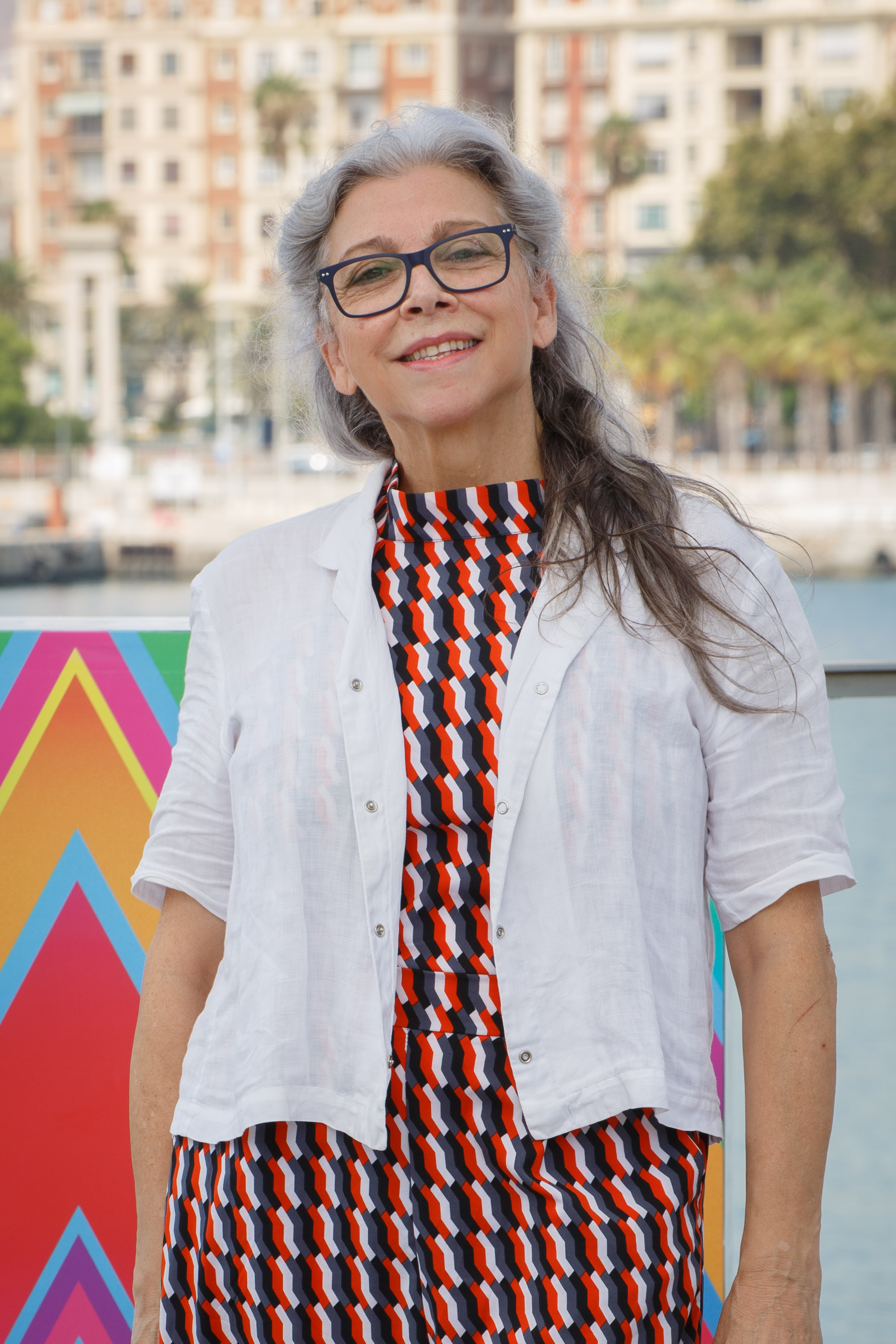
Kiti Mánver plays Paulina Morales, a lawyer who is handling Carlos’s mother’s divorce from Iván and planning to leave with Ivan.

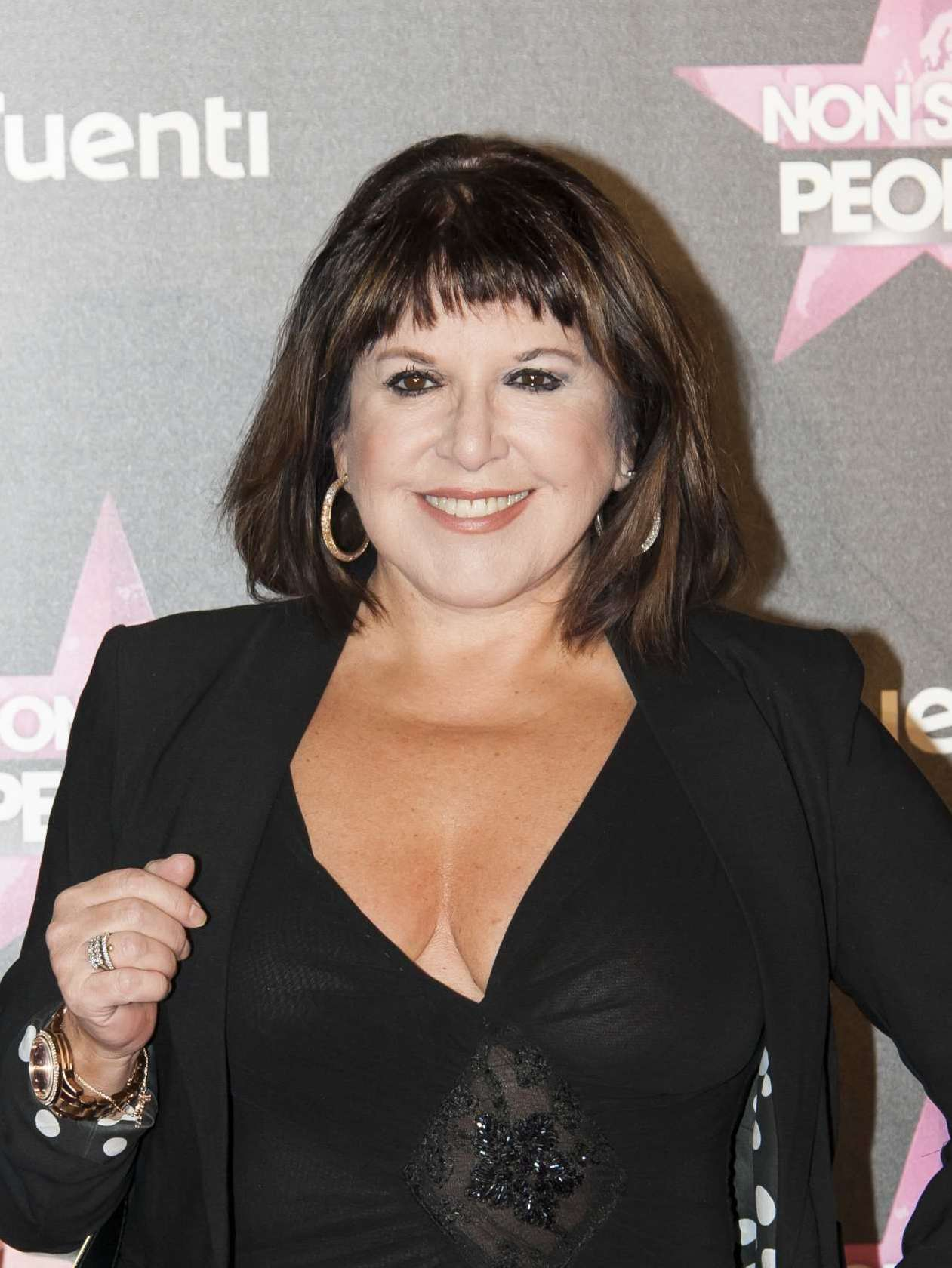
Loles León plays the secretary who warns Pepa against making a scene over Ivan.

Pepa and Iván are voice actors who dub foreign films, most recently Johnny Guitar with Joan Crawford and Sterling Hayden. Depressed because Iván has left her, Pepa oversleeps, missing a recording session with Iván, and receiving a voicemail message from him asking her to pack his things in a suitcase he will pick up. Arriving at work late after Iván has left, Pepa spends the rest of the day desperately trying to give him an important message.

Returning home, Pepa finds her answering machine filled with frantic messages from her friend, Candela. Exasperated, Pepa rips out the phone, throwing it through the glass doors onto the terrace. Hoping for an eventual visit from Iván, who loves gazpacho, she prepares gazpacho spiked with sleeping pills. Candela arrives; before she can explain her dire situation, Carlos arrives with his pushy and snobbish fiancée Marisa. Apartment-hunting, they coincidentally have come to tour Pepa's penthouse. Carlos and Pepa figure out that Carlos is Iván's son with Lucía, Iván's ex-wife, and that Pepa is Iván's lover of three years. Carlos does not know where Iván is. Meanwhile, a bored Marisa helps herself to gazpacho from the refrigerator, unaware it is spiked; she sleeps on a lounge chair on the terrace for the next several hours.

An ignored and desperate Candela tries to kill herself by jumping off the balcony but hangs by her hands and is rescued. Candela explains that she unknowingly had an affair with a man who turned out to be a Shiite who brought friends from his terrorist cell to stay. They are planning to hijack a flight to Stockholm that evening and divert it to Beirut. When the terrorists left, Candela fled; she fears that she will be implicated as an accomplice. On Carlos's recommendation, Pepa goes to consult a lawyer who is handling his mother's divorce from Iván. The lawyer, Paulina, behaves strangely and refuses to help Pepa, who sees plane tickets to Stockholm that evening on Paulina's secretary's desk.

Learning of the planned hijacking, Carlos fixes Pepa's phone, calls the police, and hangs up before (he believes) they can trace the call. With Marisa still asleep, Carlos kisses Candela. When Pepa returns, Lucía calls to say that she is coming to confront her about Iván. Carlos warns that Lucía has recently been released from a mental hospital. Tired of Iván, Pepa throws his suitcase in the trash, barely missing him as he arrives with Paulina, the lawyer who is involved with Iván, her client's husband. Not wanting to confront the furious Pepa, Iván leaves a voicemail message.

Hearing Carlos playing Lola Beltrán's "Soy infeliz"; Pepa throws the record out the window, which hits Paulina like a frisbee. Pepa hears Iván's message, rips out the phone again, and throws the answering machine out the window, hitting the couple's car. Lucía arrives at the same time as the telephone repairman and the police, who traced Carlos' call. Candela panics, but Carlos serves the spiked gazpacho. The policemen and repairman are knocked out, and Carlos and Candela fall asleep on the sofa. Lucía aims a policeman's gun at Pepa, saying that she was released from the mental institution when she faked sanity after hearing Iván's voice dubbed on a foreign film. Pepa figures out that Iván is going to Stockholm with Paulina, and the terrorists are planning to hijack their flight. Deciding to kill Iván, Lucía throws her gazpacho in Pepa's face and leaves. Lucía hijacks a motorcycle by hopping behind the biker, forcing him at gunpoint to drive her to the airport.

Pepa chases Lucía in a cab with her neighbor, Ana (the hijacked biker's girlfriend). At the airport, Lucía sees Iván and Paulina at security and aims her gun at them. Pepa thwarts the murder attempt by rolling a luggage cart at Lucía, before fainting. As the police arrest Lucía, Iván rushes to Pepa's aid and offers to talk things out with her. Declaring it is now too late, Pepa leaves. Returning to her messy home, full of unconscious people, Pepa sits on her terrace, where Marisa has just awakened. The women chat, sharing a moment of tranquility, and Pepa finally reveals what she wanted to tell Iván: she is pregnant.

== Cast ==
- Carmen Maura as Pepa Marcos
- Antonio Banderas as Carlos
- Julieta Serrano as Lucía
- María Barranco as Candela
- Rossy de Palma as Marisa
- Kiti Mánver as Paulina Morales
- Guillermo Montesinos as the taxi driver
- Chus Lampreave as the Jehovah's Witness portress
- Yayo Calvo as Lucía's father
- Loles León as the secretary
- Ángel de Andrés López as a police officer
- Fernando Guillén as Iván
- Ana Leza as Ana

== Reception ==
=== Box office ===
The film was the highest-grossing Spanish film of all-time in Spain with a gross of 1.1 billion pesetas, surpassing La vaquilla (1985), equivalent to US$8 million. It was also the most successful Spanish film in the United States at the time, with a gross of $7.2 million.

=== Critical response ===
For The New Yorker, Pauline Kael wrote that the film looked "as if it had been made by a mad scientist playing with chemical rainbow colors" and called it the "jauntiest of all war-of-the-sexes comedies." Kael said it was "fizzier, sexier" than Almodóvar's earlier films and one that is made out of "all coincidences, each one add[ing] to the crazy brio."

On the review aggregator website Rotten Tomatoes, the film holds an approval rating of 92% based on 37 reviews, with an average rating of 7.7/10. The website's critics consensus reads, "Women on the Verge of a Nervous Breakdown finds writer-director Pedro Almodóvar working in a distinctly feminist vein, with richly rewarding results." Metacritic, which uses a weighted average, assigned the film a score of 85 out of 100, based on 12 critics, indicating "universal acclaim".

The film was ranked number 78 on Empire magazine's "The 100 Best Films of World Cinema" list in 2010.

Nils Gollersrud comments that "Almodóvar's signature formula of gaudy, ironic, genre-bending storytelling had achieved a symbiosis of sorts, presenting a more confident and satisfying version of his unique cinematic vision that his earlier, rougher films had not yet achieved".

=== Accolades ===
==== United States ====
- Academy Awards
  - Nominated: Best Foreign Language Film
- Golden Globe Awards
  - Nominated: Best Foreign Language Film
- National Board of Review
  - Won: Best Foreign Language Film
- New York Film Critics
  - Won: Best Foreign Language Film
  - Runner-up: Best Actress (Carmen Maura)

==== United Kingdom ====
- BAFTA Awards (UK)
  - Nominated: Best Film not in the English Language

==== Europe ====
- David di Donatello Awards (Italy)
  - Won: Best Foreign Direction (Pedro Almodóvar)
- European Film Awards
  - Won: Best Actress – Leading Role (Carmen Maura)
  - Won: Best Young Film (Pedro Almodóvar)
  - Nominated: Best Art Direction (Félix Murcia)
- Goya Awards (Spain)
  - Won: Best Actress – Leading Role (Carmen Maura)
  - Won: Best Actress – Supporting Role (María Barranco)
  - Won: Best Editing (José Salcedo)
  - Won: Best Film
  - Won: Best Screenplay – Original (Pedro Almodóvar)
  - Nominated: Best Actor – Supporting Role (Guillermo Montesinos)
  - Nominated: Best Actress – Supporting Role (Julieta Serrano)
  - Nominated: Best Cinematography (José Luis Alcaine)
  - Nominated: Best Costume Design (José María Cossío)
  - Nominated: Best Director (Pedro Almodóvar)
  - Nominated: Best Makeup and Hairstyles (Jesús Moncusi and Gregorio Ros)
  - Nominated: Best Original Score (Bernardo Bonezzi)
  - Nominated: Best Production Design (Félix Murcia)
  - Nominated: Best Production Supervision (Esther García)
  - Nominated: Best Sound (Gilles Ortion)
  - Nominated: Best Special Effects (Reyes Abades)
- Venice Film Festival (Italy)
  - Won: Golden Osella – Best Screenplay (Pedro Almodóvar)

== Stage adaptation ==
Women on the Verge of a Nervous Breakdown has been adapted into a musical by Jeffrey Lane and David Yazbek (music and lyrics). The production opened on Broadway in previews on 5 October 2010, and officially on 4 November 2010, at the Belasco Theatre. The cast included Patti LuPone, Sherie Rene Scott, Laura Benanti, Brian Stokes Mitchell, Danny Burstein, Mary Beth Peil, Justin Guarini, de'Adre Aziza, and Nikka Graff Lanzarone, with direction by Bartlett Sher.

The production was a limited engagement that was scheduled to end 23 January 2011, but due to low grosses and ticket sales, closed early on 2 January 2011. At the time of closing, the show had played 30 previews and 69 regular performances.

A West End production of the show opened at London's Playhouse Theatre on 12 January 2015 for a 20-week run, starring Tamsin Greig, Jérôme Pradon, Haydn Gwynne and Anna Skellern.

== Television adaptation ==
In January 2022, it was reported that Apple TV+ was adapting the film into a television series with Gina Rodriguez set to star and executive produce. There has been no new information since then.

== See also ==
- List of cult films
- List of submissions to the 61st Academy Awards for Best Foreign Language Film
- List of Spanish submissions for the Academy Award for Best Foreign Language Film
