= Wait for Me in Heaven =

- Directed by: Antonio Mercero
- Starring: Pepe Soriano; José Sazatornil
- Release date: 28 January 1988
- Running time: 1h 40min
- Country: Spain
- Language: Spanish

Wait for Me in Heaven (Spanish: Espérame en el cielo) is a 1988 Spanish comedy film directed by Antonio Mercero.

== Plot ==
Paulino Alonso is an orthopedist who bears a strong resemblance to Spanish caudillo Francisco Franco and is kidnapped one day to be used as a double during public appearances that are too risky for the real Franco.

== Cast ==
- Pepe Soriano – Paulino Alonso/Francisco Franco
- José Sazatornil – Alberto Sinsoles
- Chus Lampreave – Emilia
- Manuel Codeso Ruiz – Luis
- Amparo Valle – Rosa
- Paco Cambres – Capellán de El Pardo
- José Luis Barceló – Almirante Carrero Blanco
- Josefina Calatayud – Carmen Polo
- Pedro Civera – Egyptian ambassador
