= Antonio Mercero =

Spanish director

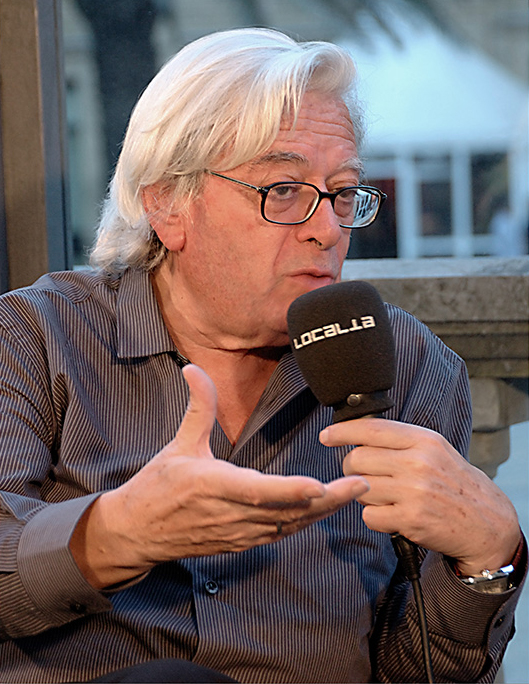
- Mercero in 2007
- Born: Antonio Mercero Juldain; 7 March 1936; Lasarte-Oria (Gipuzkoa), Spain
- Died: 12 May 2018 (aged 82); Madrid, Spain
- Occupations: Film director, screenwriter
- Years active: 1962–2007

Antonio Mercero Juldain (7 March 1936 – 12 May 2018) was a Spanish director of the television series Verano azul and Farmacia de guardia. He is best known as the director of a 1972 surrealist short horror film titled La cabina, which won an Emmy Award. His 1998 film A Time for Defiance was entered into the 21st Moscow International Film Festival where it won the Special Silver St. George. In 2010, he was awarded an Honorary Goya Award (Goya de Honor). He died on 12 May 2018 in Madrid at the age of 82 after a battle against Alzheimer's.

== Cinema filmography ==
- Trotin Troteras (1962)
- Leccion de arte (1962)
- Tajamar (1970)
- La cabina (1972)
- Manchas de sangre en un coche nuevo (1975)
- La Guerra de papa (1977)
- Tobi (1978)
- Wait for Me in Heaven (1988)
- Don Juan, mi querido fantasma (1990)
- A Time for Defiance (1998)
- The 4th Floor (2003)
- ¿Y tú quién eres? (2007)
