= List of awards and nominations received by Antonio Banderas =

Antonio Banderas awards and nominations
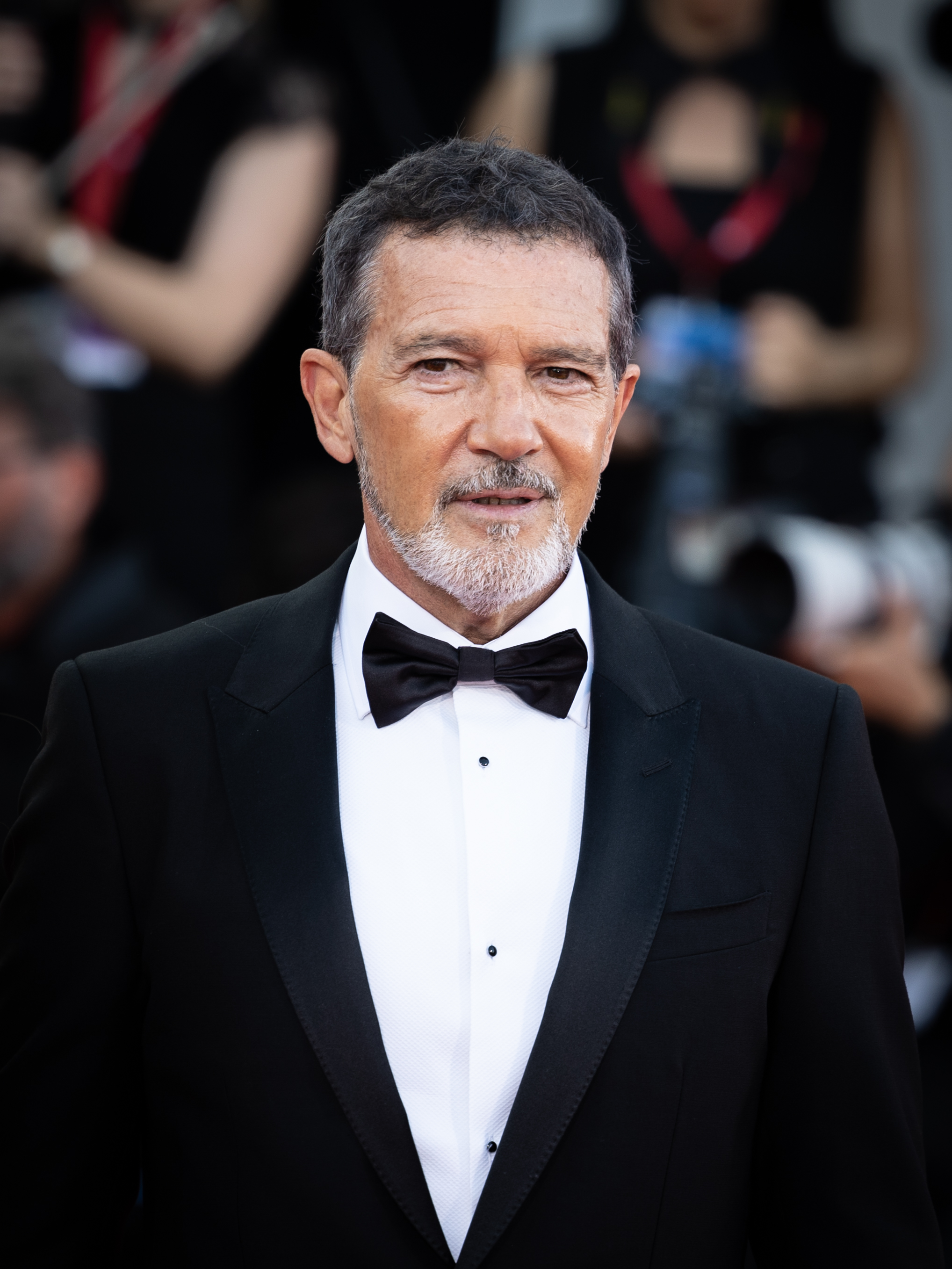
- Banderas at the 2024 Venice Film Festival
Awards and nominations
Award	Wins	Nominations
Academy Award	0	1
Cannes Film Festival	1	1
Golden Globe Award	0	5
Primetime Emmy Award	0	2
Screen Actors Guild Award	0	1
Tony Award	0	1

Totals (Note: Certain award groups do not simply award one winner. They acknowledge several different recipients, have runners-up, and have third place. Since this is a specific recognition and is different from losing an award, runner-up mentions are considered wins in this award tally. For simplification and to avoid errors, each award in this list has been presumed to have had a prior nomination.)
- Wins: 32
- Nominations: 120

Antonio Banderas is a Spanish actor known for his collaborations with acclaimed director Pedro Almodóvar. Banderas has received many award nominations throughout his career including the Academy Award for Best Actor nomination for Almodóvar's Pain and Glory (2019). He also received five Golden Globe Awards nominations for his performances in the musical Evita (1996), the action film The Mask of Zorro (1998), the HBO film And Starring Pancho Villa as Himself (2003), the NatGeo miniseries Genius: Picasso (2018), and Pain and Glory (2019).

He has also received two Primetime Emmy Award nominations for his work on the television projects portraying Pancho Villa in And Starring Pancho Villa as Himself (2004), and Pablo Picasso in Genius: Picasso (2018). He also received a Screen Actors Guild Award nomination for Genius: Picasso. In 2003, he received a Tony Award nomination for Best Actor in a Musical for his performance in the Broadway musical production of Nine. That year he did however win the Drama Desk Award for Outstanding Actor in a Musical for his performance in Nine.

In 2019, he won the Cannes Film Festival Award for Best Actor, the European Film Award for Best Actor, the Goya Award for Best Actor, and the New York Film Critics Circle Award for Best Actor for his performance in Almodovar's Pain and Glory.

== Major associations ==
=== Academy Awards ===
Year	Category	Nominated work	Result	Ref.
2020	Best Actor	Pain and Glory	Nominated	

=== Emmy Awards ===
Year	Category	Nominated work	Result	Ref.
Primetime Emmy Awards
2004	Outstanding Lead Actor in a Limited Series or Movie	And Starring Pancho Villa as Himself	Nominated	
2018	Outstanding Lead Actor in a Limited Series or Movie	Genius	Nominated	

=== Golden Globe Awards ===
Year	Category	Nominated work	Result	Ref.
1997	Best Actor – Motion Picture Musical or Comedy	Evita	Nominated	
1999	Best Actor – Motion Picture Musical or Comedy	The Mask of Zorro	Nominated	
2004	Best Actor – Miniseries or Television Film	And Starring Pancho Villa as Himself	Nominated	
2019	Best Actor – Miniseries or Television Film	Genius: Picasso	Nominated	
2020	Best Actor – Motion Picture Drama	Pain and Glory	Nominated	

=== Screen Actors Guild Awards ===
Year	Category	Nominated work	Result	Ref.
2019	Outstanding Actor in a Miniseries or Movie	Genius	Nominated	

=== Tony Awards ===
Year	Category	Nominated work	Result	Ref.
2003	Best Actor in a Musical	Nine	Nominated	

== Festival awards ==
=== Berlin International Film Festival ===
Year	Category	Nominated work	Result	Ref.
2007	Label Europa Cinemas	Summer Rain	Won	

=== Cannes Film Festival ===
Year	Category	Nominated work	Result	Ref.
2019	Best Actor	Pain and Glory	Won	

=== Venice International Film Festival ===
Year	Category	Nominated work	Result	Ref.
1999	Golden Lion for Directing	Crazy in Alabama	Nominated	

== Critics associations ==
=== Critics' Choice Movie Awards ===
Year	Category	Nominated work	Result	Ref.
2020	Best Actor	Pain and Glory	Nominated	

=== Los Angeles Film Critics Association ===
Year	Category	Nominated work	Result	Ref.
2019	Best Actor	Pain and Glory	Won	

=== New York Film Critics Circle ===
Year	Category	Nominated work	Result	Ref.
2019	Best Actor	Pain and Glory	Won	

== Miscellaneous awards ==
Organizations	Year	Category	Project	Result	Ref.
ALMA Award	1998	Outstanding Actor in a Feature Film	The Mask of Zorro	Nominated	
ALMA Award	1999	Outstanding Actor in a Feature Film	The 13th Warrior	Nominated	
ALMA Award	1999	Best Director of a Feature Film	Crazy in Alabama	Won	
ALMA Award	2001	Outstanding Actor in a Motion Picture	Spy Kids	Nominated	
Annie Award	2005	Voice Acting in a Feature Production	Shrek 2	Nominated	
AACTA Awards	2020	Best International Actor – Cinema	Pain and Glory	Nominated	
Blockbuster Entertainment Awards	1998	Favorite Actor – Action/Adventure	The Mask of Zorro	Nominated	
Drama Desk Award	2003	Outstanding Actor in a Musical	Nine	Won	
European Film Awards	1998	Jameson People's Choice Award – Best European Actor	The Mask of Zorro	Won	
European Film Awards	1998	Achievement in World Cinema	The Mask of Zorro	Nominated	
European Film Awards	1999	Achievement in World Cinema	The 13th Warrior	Won	
European Film Awards	2019	Best Actor	Pain and Glory	Won	
Fotogramas de Plata Award	1985	Best Movie Actor	Réquiem por un campesino español	Won	
Fotogramas de Plata Award	1985	Best Movie Actor	La corte de Faraón	Won	
Fotogramas de Plata Award	1985	Best Movie Actor	Caso cerrado	Won	
Fotogramas de Plata Award	1986	Best Movie Actor	Delirios de amor	Nominated	
Fotogramas de Plata Award	1987	Best Movie Actor	La ley del deseo	Nominated	
Fotogramas de Plata Award	1987	Best Movie Actor	Así como habían sido	Won	
Fotogramas de Plata Award	1988	Best TV Actor	La Mujer de tu vida: La mujer feliz	Nominated	
Fotogramas de Plata Award	1988	Best Movie Actor	Women on the Verge of a Nervous Breakdown	Won	
Fotogramas de Plata Award	1988	Best Movie Actor	El placer de matar	Won	
Fotogramas de Plata Award	1988	Best Movie Actor	Baton rouge	Won	
Fotogramas de Plata Award	1989	Best Movie Actor	Bajarse al moro	Nominated	
Fotogramas de Plata Award	1989	Best Movie Actor	Si te dicen que caí	Nominated	
Fotogramas de Plata Award	1989	Best Movie Actor	La Blanca Paloma	Won	
Fotogramas de Plata Award	1989	Best Movie Actor	Tie Me Up! Tie Me Down!	Won	
Fotogramas de Plata Award	1990	Best Movie Actor	Contra el viento	Won	
Fotogramas de Plata Award	1992	Best Movie Actor	Una mujer bajo la lluvia	Nominated	
Fotogramas de Plata Award	1992	Best Movie Actor	The Mambo Kings	Nominated	
Golden India Catalina Award	1989	Best Actor	Tie Me Up! Tie Me Down!	Won	
Goya Awards	1986	Best Supporting Actor	Matador	Nominated	
Goya Awards	1989	Best Actor	Tie Me Up! Tie Me Down!	Nominated	
Goya Awards	1995	Best Actor	Two Much	Nominated	
Goya Awards	2011	Best Actor	The Skin I Live In	Nominated	
Goya Awards	2019	Best Actor	Pain and Glory	Won	
Hollywood Film Awards	2019	Best Actor	Pain and Glory	Won	
Imagen Awards	1998	Lasting Image Award	The Mask of Zorro	Won	
Imagen Awards	2003	Best Actor	Once Upon a Time in Mexico	Won	
Imagen Awards	2003	Best Actor in a Television Drama	And Starring Pancho Villa as himself	Won	
Imagen Awards	2005	Best Actor	The Legend of Zorro	Nominated	
Imagen Awards	2006	Best Actor	Take the Lead	Won	
International Cinephile Society	2019	Best Actor	Pain and Glory	Won	
MTV Movie & TV Awards	1995	Best Kiss	Desperado	Nominated	
MTV Movie & TV Awards	1995	Most Desirable Male	Desperado	Nominated	
MTV Movie & TV Awards	1998	Best Fight	The Mask of Zorro	Nominated	
MTV Movie & TV Awards	2004	Best Comedic Performance	Shrek 2	Nominated	
Murcia Week of Spanish Cinema	1985	Best Actor	Réquiem por un campesino español	Won	
Murcia Week of Spanish Cinema	1985	Best Actor	La corte de Faraón	Won	
Murcia Week of Spanish Cinema	1986	Best Actor	Matador	Nominated	
NAMIC Vision Award	2003	Best Dramatic Performance	And Starring Pancho Villa as himself	Won	
Nickelodeon Kids' Choice Awards	2002	Favorite Male Butt Kicker	Spy Kids	Nominated	
Nickelodeon Kids' Choice Awards	2011	Favorite Voice from an Animated Movie	Puss in Boots	Nominated	
Sant Jordi Awards	1988	Best Spanish Actor	27 Hours / Delirios de amor / Law of Desire	Nominated	
Sant Jordi Awards	2020	Best Actor in a Spanish Film	Pain and Glory	Nominated	
Satellite Awards	2020	Best Actor – Motion Picture Drama	Pain and Glory	Nominated	
Saturn Awards	2011	Best Actor	The Skin I Live In	Nominated	
Spanish Actors Union Award	1992	Lead Performance	The Mambo Kings	Nominated	
Theatre World Award	2003	Best Actor	Nine	Won	
Valladolid International Film Festival	1989	Best Actor	La Blanca Paloma	Won	
