= List of Antonio Banderas performances =

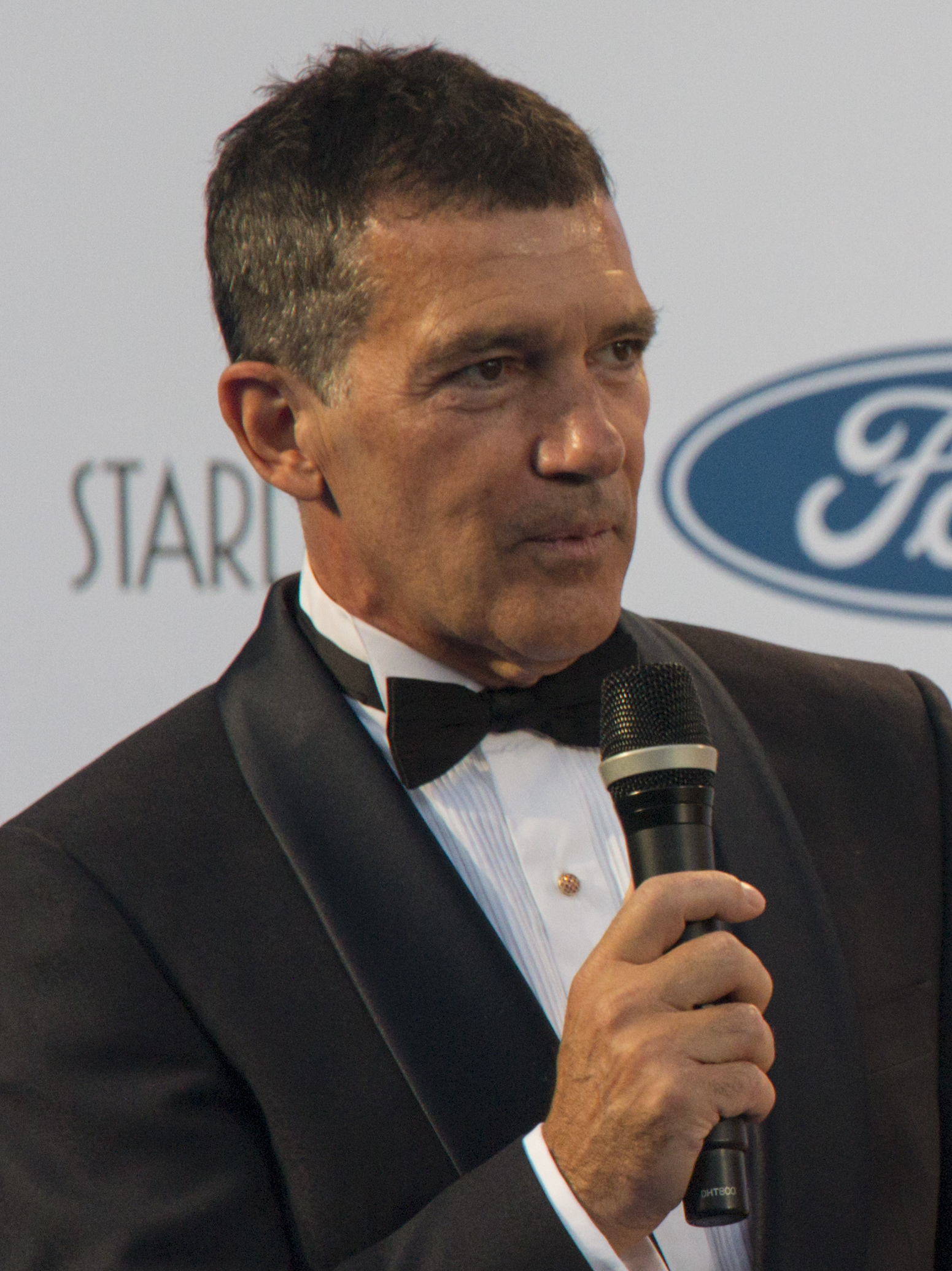
Banderas at the 2019 Starlite Gala

Antonio Banderas is a Spanish actor and filmmaker who has appeared in various film, television, and theatre productions.

Banderas is known for his numerous collaborations with director Pedro Almodóvar acting in Labyrinth of Passion (1982), Matador (1986), Law of Desire (1987), Women on the Verge of a Nervous Breakdown (1988), Tie Me Up! Tie Me Down! (1989), The Skin I Live In (2011), and Pain and Glory (2019), the later of which earned him the Cannes Film Festival Award for Best Actor as well as a nomination for the Academy Award for Best Actor.

In 1992, Banderas made his American film debut with the musical drama The Mambo Kings (1992), followed by roles in Philadelphia (1993), Interview with the Vampire (1994), Assassins (1995), and Evita (1996). He portrayed Zorro in The Mask of Zorro (1998), and The Legend of Zorro (2005). He has starred in the franchise films, including as the patriarch in the Spy Kids series (2001–2003) and as the voice of Puss in Boots in the Shrek films (2004–present).

On stage, Banderas made Broadway debut as Guido Contini in Nine (2003), for which he was nominated for a Tony Award for Best Actor in a Musical and won a Drama Desk Award for Outstanding Actor in a Musical. He has also starred and directed productions of the musicals A Chorus Line (2019) and Company (2021). On television he portrayed Benito Mussolini in the miniseries Benito (1993) and received Primetime Emmy Award nominations for his roles as Pancho Villa in the HBO film And Starring Pancho Villa as Himself (2004) and Pablo Picasso in the anthology series Genius (2018).

== Film ==
=== As actor ===
| Year | Title | Role | Director(s) | Notes | Ref. |
|---|---|---|---|---|---|
| 1982 | Pestañas postizas | Antonio Juan | Enrique Belloch | | |
| 1982 | Labyrinth of Passion | Sadec | Pedro Almodóvar | | |
| 1983 | Y del seguro... líbranos Señor! | Pipi | Antonio del Real | | |
| 1984 | El caso Almería | Juan Luque | Pedro Costa Musté | | |
| 1984 | El señor Galíndez | Eduardo | Rodolfo Kuhn | | |
| 1984 | Los zancos (The Stilts) | Alberto | Carlos Saura | | |
| 1985 | Requiem for a Spanish Peasant | Paco | Francesc Betriu | | |
| 1985 | La corte de Faraón (The Court of the Pharaoh) | Fray José | José Luis García Sánchez | | |
| 1985 | Caso cerrado | Gasofa | Juan Caño Arecha | | |
| 1986 | Puzzle | Andrés | Lluís Josep Comerón | | |
| 1986 | Matador | Ángel | Pedro Almodóvar | | |
| 1986 | 27 horas | Rafa | Montxo Armendáriz | | |
| 1986 | Delirios de amor | Amante de Jaime | Cristina Andreu Cuevas | Segment: "Delirio 3" | |
| 1987 | Law of Desire | Antonio Benítez | Pedro Almodóvar | | |
| 1987 | Así como habían sido | Damián | Andrés Linares | | |
| 1988 | Women on the Verge of a Nervous Breakdown | Carlos | Pedro Almodóvar | | |
| 1988 | El placer de matar | Luis | Félix Rotaeta | | |
| 1988 | Baton Rouge | Antonio | Rafael Moleón | | |
| 1989 | Bajarse al moro | Alberto | Fernando Colomo | | |
| 1989 | If They Tell You I Fell | Marcos | Vicente Aranda | | |
| 1989 | La blanca paloma | Mario | Juan Miñón | | |
| 1989 | Tie Me Up! Tie Me Down! | Ricky | Pedro Almodóvar | | |
| 1989 | El Acto | Carlos | Héctor Fáver | | |
| 1990 | Contra el viento (Against the Wind) | Juan | Paco Periñán | | |
| 1991 | Terra Nova | Antonio | Calogero Salvo | | |
| 1992 | Una mujer bajo la lluvia (A Woman in the Rain) | Miguel | Gerardo Vera | | |
| 1992 | The Mambo Kings | Néstor Castillo | Arne Glimcher | | |
| 1993 | ¡Dispara! | Marcos | Carlos Saura | | |
| 1993 | The House of the Spirits | Pedro Tercero García | Bille August | | |
| 1993 | Philadelphia | Miguel Álvarez | Jonathan Demme | | |
| 1994 | Of Love and Shadows | Francisco Leal | Betty Kaplan | | |
| 1994 | Interview with the Vampire | Armand | Neil Jordan | | |
| 1995 | Miami Rhapsody | Antonio | David Frankel | | |
| 1995 | Desperado | Manito "El Mariachi" | Robert Rodriguez | | |
| 1995 | Four Rooms | Man | Robert Rodriguez | Segment: "The Misbehavers" | |
| 1995 | Assassins | Miguel Bain | Richard Donner | | |
| 1995 | Never Talk to Strangers | Tony Ramirez | Peter Hall | | |
| 1995 | Two Much | Art Dodge | Fernando Trueba | | |
| 1996 | Evita | Ché | Alan Parker | | |
| 1998 | The Mask of Zorro | Alejandro Murrieta/Zorro | Martin Campbell | | |
| 1999 | The 13th Warrior | Ahmad ibn Fadlan | John McTiernan | | |
| 1999 | The White River Kid | Morales Pittman | Arne Glimcher | | |
| 1999 | Play It to the Bone | César Domínguez | Ron Shelton | | |
| 2001 | The Body | Father Matt Gutiérrez | Jonas McCord | | |
| 2001 | Spy Kids | Gregorio "Greg" Cortez | Robert Rodriguez | | |
| 2001 | Original Sin | Luís Vargast | Michael Cristofer | | |
| 2002 | Femme Fatale | Nicolas Bardo | Brian De Palma | | |
| 2002 | Ballistic: Ecks vs. Sever | Jeremiah Ecks | Kaos | | |
| 2002 | Spy Kids 2: The Island of Lost Dreams | Gregorio "Greg" Cortez | Robert Rodriguez | | |
| 2002 | Frida | David Alfaro Siqueiros | Julie Taymor | | |
| 2003 | Spy Kids 3-D: Game Over | Gregorio "Greg" Cortez | Robert Rodriguez | Cameo | |
| 2003 | Once Upon a Time in Mexico | El Mariachi | Robert Rodriguez | | |
| 2003 | Imagining Argentina | Carlos Rueda | Christopher Hampton | | |
| 2004 | Shrek 2 | Puss in Boots | Andrew Adamson, Kelly Asbury, & Conrad Vernon | Voice | |
| 2004 | Far Far Away Idol | Puss in Boots | Simon J. Smith | Short film | |
| 2005 | The Legend of Zorro | Don Alejandro de la Vega/Zorro | Martin Campbell | | |
| 2006 | Take the Lead | Pierre Dulaine | Liz Friedlander | | |
| 2007 | Bordertown | Alfonso Díaz | Gregory Nava | | |
| 2007 | Shrek the Third | Puss in Boots | Chris Miller | Voice | |
| 2008 | My Mom's New Boyfriend | Tommy Lucero / Tomas Martinez | George Gallo | | |
| 2008 | The Other Man | Ralph | Richard Eyre | | |
| 2009 | Thick as Thieves | Gabriel Martin | Mimi Leder | Direct to-DVD | |
| 2010 | Shrek Forever After | Puss in Boots | Mike Mitchell | Voice | |
| 2010 | You Will Meet a Tall Dark Stranger | Greg Clemente | Woody Allen | | |
| 2011 | The Big Bang | Ned Cruz | Tony Krantz | | |
| 2011 | Black Gold | Emir Nesib | Jean-Jacques Annaud | | |
| 2011 | The Skin I Live In | Dr. Robert Ledgard | Pedro Almodóvar | | |
| 2011 | Puss in Boots | Puss in Boots | Chris Miller | Voice | |
| 2012 | Haywire | Rodrigo | Steven Soderbergh | | |
| 2012 | Puss in Boots: The Three Diablos | Puss in Boots | Raman Hui | Voice; Short film | |
| 2012 | Ruby Sparks | Mort | Jonathan Dayton & Valerie Faris | | |
| 2013 | I'm So Excited | Léon | Pedro Almodóvar | Cameo | |
| 2013 | Machete Kills | Gregorio "Greg" Cortez | Robert Rodriguez | Cameo | |
| 2013 | Justin and the Knights of Valour | Sir Clorex (voice) | Manuel Sicilia | Also producer | |
| 2014 | Autómata | Jacq Vaucan | Gabe Ibáñez | Also producer | |
| 2014 | The Expendables 3 | Galgo | Patrick Hughes | | |
| 2015 | The SpongeBob Movie: Sponge Out of Water | Burger Beard | Paul Tibbitt | | |
| 2015 | Knight of Cups | Tonio | Terrence Malick | | |
| 2015 | The 33 | Mario Sepúlveda | Patricia Riggen | | |
| 2016 | Altamira | Marcelino Sanz de Sautuola | Hugh Hudson | | |
| 2017 | Black Butterfly | Paul | Brian Goodman | | |
| 2017 | Gun Shy | Turk Enry | Simon West | | |
| 2017 | Security | Eduardo "Eddie" Deacon | Alain DesRochers | | |
| 2017 | Acts of Vengeance | Frank Valera | Isaac Florentine | | |
| 2017 | Bullet Head | Blue | Paul Solet | | |
| 2017 | The Music of Silence | The Maestro | Michael Radford | | |
| 2018 | Beyond the Edge | Gordon | Aleksandr Boguslavskiy & Francesco Cinquemani | | |
| 2018 | Life Itself | Mr. Saccione | Dan Fogelman | | |
| 2019 | Pain and Glory | Salvador Mallo | Pedro Almodóvar | | |
| 2019 | The Laundromat | Ramón Fonseca | Steven Soderbergh | | |
| 2020 | Dolittle | Rassouli | Stephen Gaghan | | |
| 2021 | Hitman's Wife's Bodyguard | Aristotle Papadopoulos | Patrick Hughes | | |
| 2021 | Official Competition | Félix Rivero | Gastón Duprat & Mariano Cohn | | |
| 2022 | Uncharted | Santiago Moncada | Ruben Fleischer | | |
| 2022 | Code Name Banshee | Caleb | Jon Keeyes | | |
| 2022 | The Enforcer | Cuda | Richard Hughes | | |
| 2022 | Puss in Boots: The Last Wish | Puss in Boots | Joel Crawford | Voice | |
| 2023 | Indiana Jones and the Dial of Destiny | Renaldo | James Mangold | | |
| 2023 | Journey to Bethlehem | Herod | Adam Anders | | |
| 2024 | Cult Killer | Mikhail Tellini | Jon Keeyes | | |
| 2024 | The Clean Up Crew | Gabriel | Jon Keeyes | | |
| 2024 | Babygirl | Jacob | Halina Reijn | | |
| 2024 | Paddington in Peru | Hunter Cabot | Dougal Wilson | | |
| 2026 | Above & Below | Burns | Jesse V. Johnson | | |
| 2026 | Tony | Ciro | Matt Johnson | | |
| 2026 | Up Against It | Álvaro | Trudie Styler | | |

=== As director ===
| Year | Title |
|---|---|
| 1999 | Crazy in Alabama |
| 2006 | Summer Rain |

== Television ==
| Year | Title | Role | Notes | Ref |
|---|---|---|---|---|
| 1984 | Fragmentos de interior | Joaquín | 4 episodes | |
| 1990 | La Mujer de tu vida | Antonio | Episode: "La mujer feliz" | |
| 1990 | La otra historia de Rosendo Juárez | Rosendo Juárez | Television film | |
| 1993 | Benito | Benito Mussolini | Miniseries; 3 episodes | |
| 2003 | And Starring Pancho Villa as Himself | Pancho Villa | Television film | |
| 2006 | Saturday Night Live | Himself (host) | Episode: "Antonio Banderas/Mary J. Blige" | |
| 2007 | Shrek the Halls | Puss in Boots | Voice; Television special | |
| 2010 | Scared Shrekless | Puss in Boots | Voice; Television special | |
| 2018 | Genius | Pablo Picasso | Lead role; Season 2 | |
| TBA | True Detective | Rai García | Season 5 | |

== Theatre ==
| Year | Title | Role | Director | Venue | Ref |
|---|---|---|---|---|---|
| 2003 | Nine | Guido Contini | David Leveaux | Eugene O'Neill Theatre, Broadway | |
| 2019 | A Chorus Line | Zach | Antonio Banderas | Teatro del Soho, Spain | |
| 2021 | Company | Bobby | Antonio Banderas | Teatro del Soho, Spain | |
