= Tasio =

- Directed by: Montxo Armendáriz
- Screenplay by: Montxo Armendáriz; Marisa Ibarra
- Produced by: Elías Querejeta
- Starring: Patxi Bisquert; Isidro José Solano; Garikoitz Mendigutxia; Amaia Lasa; Nacho Martínez; José María Asín; Paco Sagarzazu; Enrique Goicoechea; Elena Uriz
- Cinematography: José Luis Alcaine
- Edited by: Pablo G. del Amo
- Music by: Ángel Illarramendi
- Production company: Elías Querejeta PC
- Release date: 19 September 1984 (Zinemaldia)
- Country: Spain
- Language: Spanish

Tasio is a 1984 Spanish drama film directed by Montxo Armendáriz, in his full-length debut. It stars Garikoitz Mendigutxia, Isidro José Solano and Patxi Bisquert as the titular character, a charcoal burner and poacher, at different stages of his life. The film became a staple of Basque cinema.

The film had its world premiere at the 32nd San Sebastián International Film Festival on 19 September 1984.

== Plot ==
The plot follows the life of Tasio, a poacher and charcoal burner moved by a deep conviction of living without being exploited.

== Cast ==
- Patxi Bisquert as Tasio (adult)
- Isidro José Solano as Tasio (teen)
- Garikoitz Mendigutxia as Tasio (child)
- Amaia Lasa as Paulina
- José Mari Asín as Luis
- Nacho Martínez as Tasio's brother
- Paco Sagarzazu as guarda
- Txema Blasco as Ángel
- Elena Uriz as the mother
- Enrique Goicoechea as the father
- Miguel Rellán as priest

== Production ==
Inspired by the real story of Anastasio Ochoa Ruiz, "Tasio" (1916–1989), the screenplay was penned by Montxo Armendáriz alongside Marisa Ibarra. An Elías Querejeta PC production, the film was fully shot in Spanish rather than Basque. This decision stirred criticism among some Basque milieus. Filming locations included the Urbasa range in Navarre.

== Release ==
The film premiered on 19 September 1984 at the 32nd San Sebastián International Film Festival. A 4K version restored by Filmoteca Vasca at Bologna's L'immagine Ritrovata laboratory was screened at the Cannes Classics section of the 2024 Cannes Film Festival and the Klasikoak programme of the 72nd San Sebastián International Film Festival.

== Reception ==
The film was enthusiastically received by the public and critics alike. Diego Galán of El País described Tasio as a "film of haunting beauty". Nina Darnton of The New York Times pointed out that the film "is undramatic and basically uneventful, but it is never boring".

== See also ==
- List of Spanish films of 1984
