= Nacho Martínez =

Spanish actor (1952–1996)

- Born: Ignacio Martinez Navia-Osorio; 8 July 1952; Asturias, Spain
- Died: 24 July 1996 (aged 44); Madrid, Spain
- Occupation: Actor
- Years active: 1986–1996

Nacho Martínez (born Ignacio Martínez Navia-Osorio, 8 July 1952 – 24 July 1996) was a Spanish actor.

== Biography ==
Born in Mieres, Asturias in 1952, Martínez began his film career as Tasio's brother in the movie Tasio directed by Montxo Armendáriz in 1984. However, the character for which he will be most remembered for is the bullfighter in the film Matador in 1986, Pedro Almodóvar, where he co-starred with a very young Antonio Banderas. With Almodóvar, he also acted in Law of Desire (1987) as well as High Heels (1991).

In 1986, Martínez was a candidate for Fotogramas de Plata as best actor, coincided with Ángela Molina in La Mitad del Cielo, by Manuel Gutiérrez Aragón, and had a small role in the cult movie Viaje a Ninguna Parte, directed by Fernando Fernán Gómez.

Along with his film career, Martínez had a long career as a voice actor in dubbing, film, and cartoons.

Martínez died from lung cancer at the age of 44.

In 2006, Martínez was remembered at the twentieth edition of the Goya Awards.

== Filmography ==
- Tasio (1984) - Hermano de Tasio
- Extramuros (1985)
- Caso cerrado (1985) - Amante de Isabel
- Hierro dulce (1985)
- Matador (1986) - Diego
- El viaje a ninguna parte (1986)
- La Mitad del Cielo (1986) - Delgado
- Adiós, Pequeña (1986)
- Law of Desire (1987) - Doctor Martín
- Los días del cometa (1989)
- El anónimo... ¡vaya papelón! (1990) - Don Manuel
- A solas contigo (1990) - Carlos
- La viuda del capitán Estrada (1991) - Baltasar
- High Heels (1991) - Juan
- La febre d'Or (1993) - Barón de Esmalrich
- Mi Nombre es Sombra (1996) - Crane (uncredited) (final film role)

The Gijón International Film Festival granted a National Film Award named after 'Nacho Martínez', since 2002 to people who have contributed significantly to the film industry. It is a unique sculpture made by Jaime Herrero.
