= Bibiana Fernández =

Spanish actress, singer, TV presenter and model

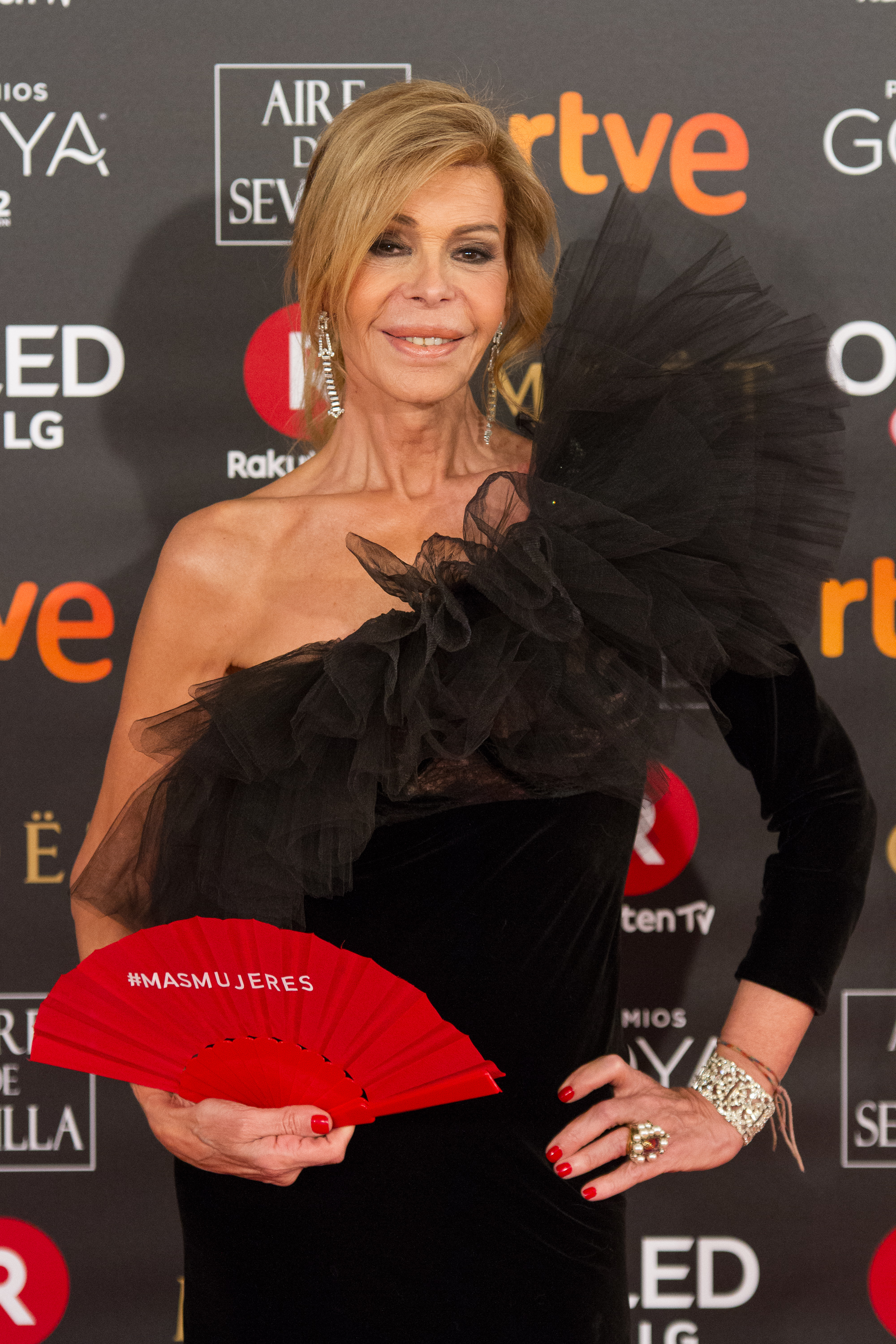
- Fernández in 2018
- Born: 13 February 1954 (age 72); Tangier, Tangier International Zone
- Other names: Bibi Andersen

Bibiana Manuela Fernández Chica (born 13 February 1954), formerly known as Bibi Andersen, is a Spanish actress and former model.

== Early life ==
Fernández was born in Tangier and spent her childhood in Málaga. She decided to receive hormone treatment in adulthood. She completed her gender confirmation surgery in 1991 and changed her name to Bibiana in 1994.

== Career ==
After spending some time performing in various shows around Barcelona, she went on to make her film debut in Vicente Aranda's Cambio de Sexo (Sex Change) in 1976.

With this movie she rose to stardom in Spain, appearing in several TV shows and releasing several hit songs such as "Call Me Lady Champagne" and "Sálvame".

In the 1980s she began working with film director Pedro Almodóvar and was cast in many of his movies. She also hosted different television shows while acting in more films.

In 2005, she started appearing as a panelist in the talk show Channel Nº4 on Cuatro with Boris Izaguirre and Ana García Siñeriz.

== Discography ==
- 1980 – Bibi Andersen (album)
- 1980 – "Call Me Lady Champagne" (single)
- 1980 – "Sálvame" (single)
- 1982 – "Canto" (single)

== Filmography ==
- Cambio de Sexo (1977)
- La noche más hermosa (1983)
- Matador (1986)
- La ley del deseo (1987)
- Rowing with the Wind (1988)
- Tacones lejanos (1992)
- Acción mutante (1993)
- Kika (1993)
- Más que amor, frenesí (1996)
- Atómica (1998)

== Personal life ==
She was married to Asdrúbal Ametller from 2000 to 2003.
