= Change of Sex =

Cambio de Sexo
- Directed by: Vicente Aranda
- Written by: Vicente Aranda; Joaquin Jordá; Carlos Durán
- Produced by: Jaime Fernandez Cid
- Starring: Victoria Abril; Lou Castel; Fernando Sancho; Rafaela Aparicio; Bibí Andersen
- Cinematography: Néstor Almendros; José Luis Alcaine
- Edited by: Maricel Bautista
- Music by: Ricardo Miralles
- Production company: Morgana Films
- Distributed by: Warner Española
- Release date: 13 May 1977
- Running time: 108 minutes
- Country: Spain
- Language: Spanish

Change of Sex or Sex Change (Spanish: Cambio de Sexo) is a 1977 Spanish film, written and directed by Vicente Aranda. It stars Victoria Abril as José Maria. The film dramatizes the story of a young trans girl, who moves to the city to explore her desire to live as a woman.

== Synopsis ==
In a small town outside of Barcelona, José Maria is a teenager who starts to identify herself as a woman. While she begins to show her desire to be a woman through her appearance, the reactions within her household make things more difficult for her. Her rude father is a male chauvinist who, afraid of his "son's" softness, puts her to work chopping wood. Then, her father takes her to a cabaret show, to expose José Maria to women. However at a show, José Maria is exposed to a dancer named Bibi, who is a transgender woman, for the first time. After the show, his father tries to force José Maria to have sex with a prostitute, but she refuses. José Maria flees from there feeling guilty. She escapes to the city where she tries to be accepted as a woman with tragic results. While working as a hairdresser, she meets Bibi, the transgender woman who works at the cabaret and José Maria goes to work with her. In the show, she is not José Maria anymore, but Maria José. At the cabaret, she falls in love with Durán, the owner of the bar. Durán, reluctant at the beginning, nevertheless starts a relationship with Maria José, who wants to go all the way, and plans to travel to London to have a gender reassignment operation.

== Cast ==
- Victoria Abril as José María/María José
- Lou Castel as Durán
- Fernando Sancho as José Maria's father
- Rafaela Aparicio as Pilar
- Daniel Martín as Pedro
- Montserrat Carulla as José Maria's mother
- Bibi Andersen as Bibí
- Mario Gas as Álvaro
- Maria Elías as Lolita
