= Antonio Banderas =

Spanish actor (born 1960)

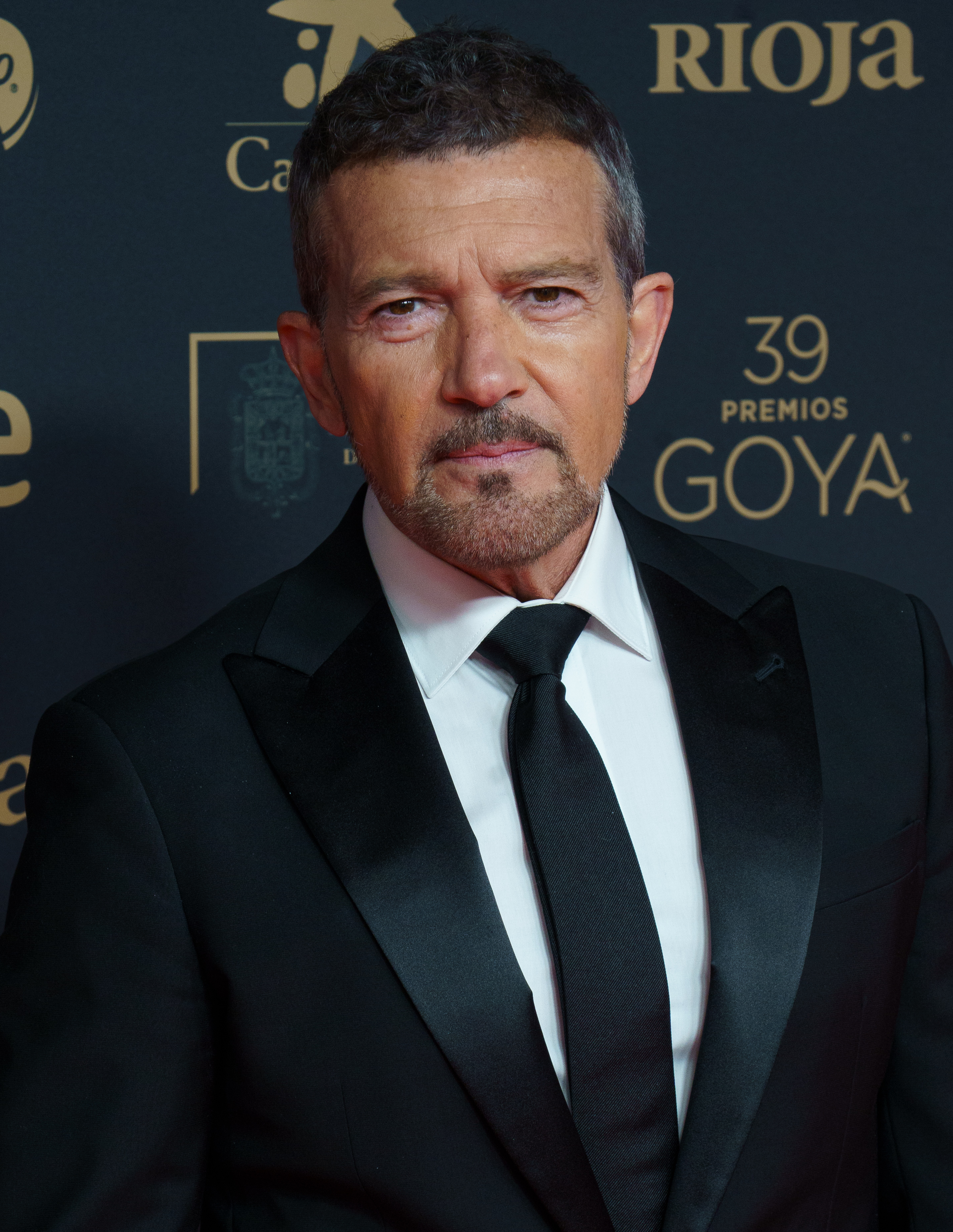
- Banderas in 2025
- Born: José Antonio Domínguez Bandera; 10 August 1960 (age 66); Málaga, Spain
- Occupations: Actor; impresario; filmmaker
- Years active: 1982–present
- Works: Full list
- Spouses: Ana Leza (m. 1987; div. 1996) Melanie Griffith (m. 1996; div. 2015)
- Partner: Nicole Kimpel (2015–present)
- Children: 1
- Awards: Full list

José Antonio Domínguez Bandera (born 10 August 1960), known professionally as Antonio Banderas, (Note: IPA: [anˈtonjo βanˈdeɾas]) is a Spanish actor. Known for his work in films of several genres, he has received numerous accolades, including a Cannes Film Festival Award and a Goya Award, as well as nominations for an Academy Award, two Primetime Emmy Awards, five Golden Globe Awards, and a Tony Award.

Banderas made his acting debut at a small theater in Málaga, where he caught the attention of director Pedro Almodóvar, who gave the actor his film debut in the screwball comedy Labyrinth of Passion (1982). They have since collaborated on eight films, including Matador (1986), Law of Desire (1987), Women on the Verge of a Nervous Breakdown (1988), Tie Me Up! Tie Me Down! (1989), The Skin I Live In (2011), and Pain and Glory (2019), the last of which earned him the Cannes Film Festival Award for Best Actor as well as a nomination for the Academy Award for Best Actor.

Banderas made his American film debut with the musical drama The Mambo Kings (1992), followed by roles in Philadelphia (1993), Interview with the Vampire (1994), Assassins (1995), Evita (1996), Official Competition (2021), Babygirl (2024), and Tony (2026). He took roles in franchises playing El Mariachi in Desperado (1995) and Once Upon a Time in Mexico (2003), Zorro in The Mask of Zorro (1998) and The Legend of Zorro (2005), the patriarch in the Spy Kids series (2001–2003) and voiced Puss in Boots in the Shrek films (2004–present). He has also acted in the adventure films The Expendables 3 (2014), Uncharted (2022), Indiana Jones and the Dial of Destiny (2023), and Paddington in Peru (2024).

On stage, Banderas made his Broadway theatre debut playing an Italian film director in the musical revival Nine (2003), for which he was nominated for a Tony Award for Best Actor in a Musical. For his work on television, he received Primetime Emmy Award nominations for his roles as Pancho Villa in the HBO television film And Starring Pancho Villa as Himself (2004) and Pablo Picasso in the National Geographic anthology series Genius (2018). He made his directorial debut with the comedy film Crazy in Alabama (1999), followed by Summer Rain (2006).

== Early life ==
José Antonio Domínguez Bandera was born on 10 August 1960, in Málaga, Andalusia, to Civil Guard officer José Domínguez Prieto (1920–2008) and schoolteacher Ana Bandera Gallego (1933–2017). He has a younger brother named Francisco. As a young boy, Banderas wanted to become a professional football player until a broken foot sidelined his dreams at the age of 15. He showed a strong interest in the performing arts and formed part of the ARA Theatre School run by Ángeles Rubio-Argüelles y Alessandri (wife of diplomat and filmmaker Edgar Neville) and the College of Dramatic Art, both in Málaga. His work in the theater and his performances on the streets eventually landed him a spot with the Spanish National Theatre.

== Career ==
=== 1982–1989: Early collaborations with Pedro Almodóvar ===
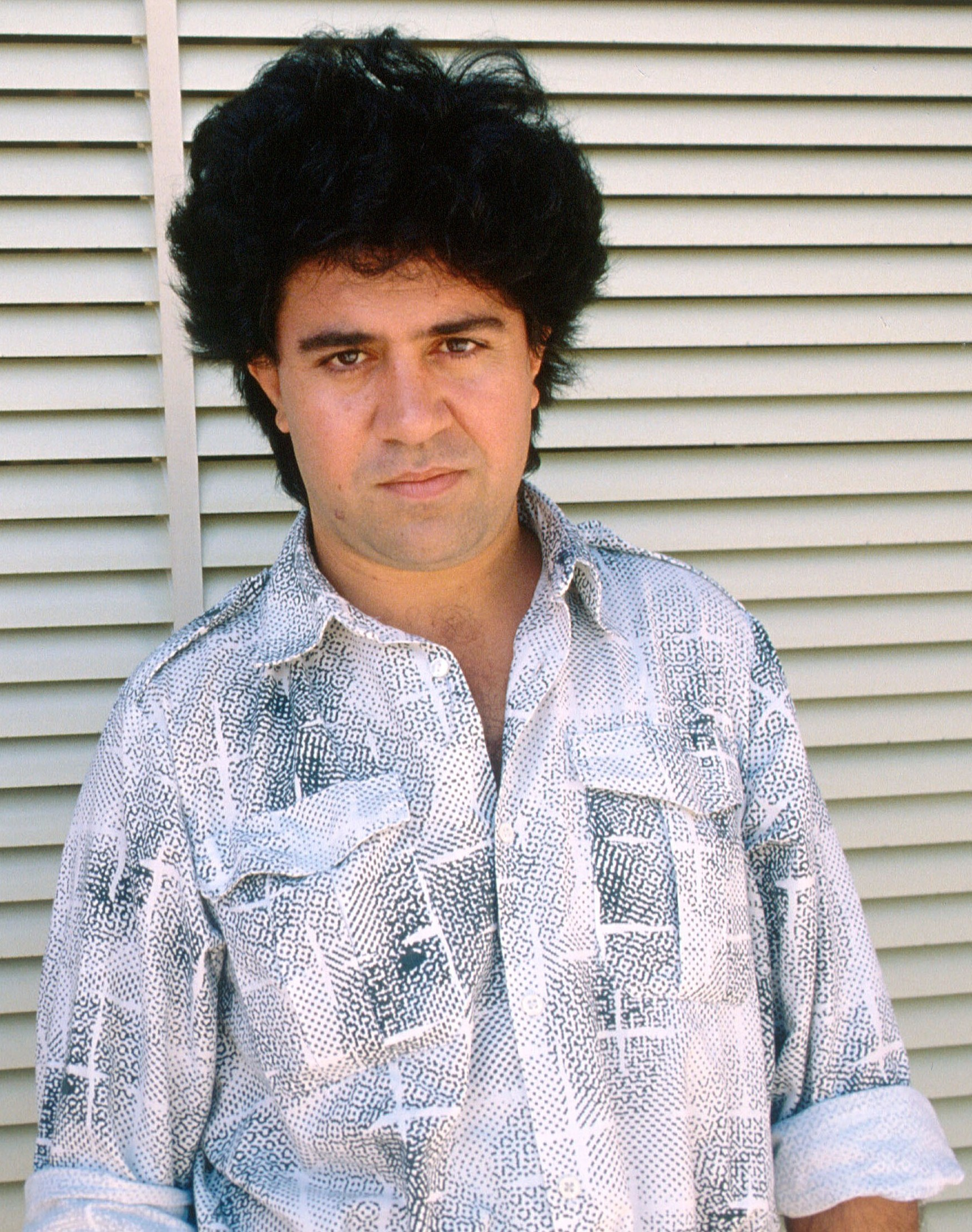
Banderas has acted in numerous films directed by Pedro Almodóvar (photo)

Banderas began his acting studies at the School of Dramatic Art in Málaga and made his acting debut at a small theater in Málaga. He began working in small shops during Spain's post-dictatorial cultural movement known as La Movida Madrileña.

While performing with the theater, Banderas caught the attention of Spanish director Pedro Almodóvar, who gave the young actor his film debut in the screwball sex comedy Labyrinth of Passion (1982). Five years later, he went on to appear in the director's comedic thriller Law of Desire (1987), making headlines with his performance as a gay man, which required him to engage in his first male-to-male onscreen kiss. Banderas appeared in Almodóvar's surrealist sex comedy Matador, with Vincent Canby of The New York Times writing, "The movie looks terrific and is acted with absolute, straight-faced conviction by the excellent cast headed by Miss Serna, Mr. Martinez and Mr. Banderas."

The director cast him in his internationally acclaimed 1988 film, Women on the Verge of a Nervous Breakdown. Rita Kemply of The Washington Post described Banderas's performance as "warm" and described the film as a "glossy delight." The recognition Banderas gained for his role increased one year later, when he starred in Almodóvar's controversial Tie Me Up! Tie Me Down! (1989) as a mental patient who kidnaps a porn star (Victoria Abril) and keeps her tied up until she returns his love. The breakthrough role helped spur him on to Hollywood. Almodóvar is credited with helping launch Banderas's international career, as he became a regular feature in his films throughout the 1980s.

=== 1990–1999: Hollywood stardom ===
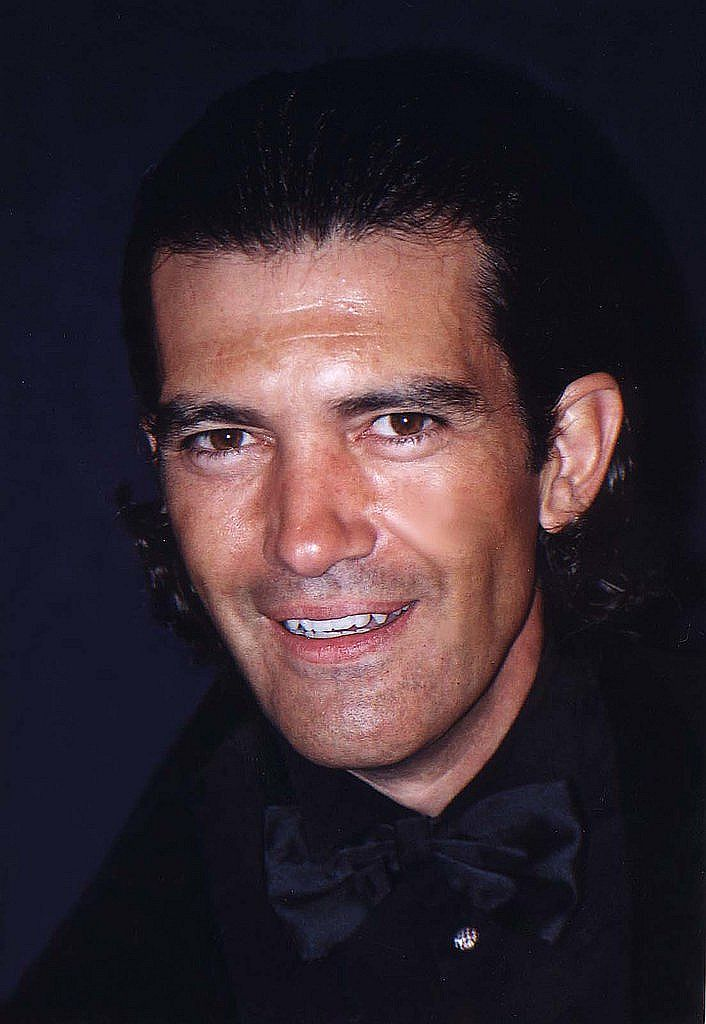
Banderas in 1997

In 1991, Madonna introduced Banderas to Hollywood. (He was an object of her desires in her pseudodocumentary film of one of her concert tours, Madonna: Truth or Dare.) The following year, still speaking minimal English, he began acting in American films. Despite having to learn all his lines phonetically, Banderas still managed to turn in a critically praised performance as a struggling musician in his first American drama film, The Mambo Kings (1992). Kenneth Turan of The Los Angeles Times described Banderas as giving a "quietly effective job". David Nansen of Newsweek declared, "Banderas had to learn English to play this role, but you wouldn't know it: he plumbs all the nuances of charm and self-pity in Nestor's melancholic soul". Owen Gleiberman of Entertainment Weekly also praised Banderas's performance writing, "he gives a surprisingly confident and subtle performance as the implosive Nestor".

Banderas then broke through to mainstream American audiences in the 1993 Jonathan Demme film Philadelphia as the life partner of lawyer Tom Hanks. Also in 1993, he acted in the Bille August-directed The House of the Spirits, an adaptation of the Isabel Allende novel of the same name. Banderas acted alongside Meryl Streep, Jeremy Irons, Glenn Close, and Winona Ryder. The film's success earned Banderas wide recognition, and the following year, he was given a role in Neil Jordan's high-profile adaptation of Anne Rice's Interview with the Vampire (1994), sharing the screen with Brad Pitt, Tom Cruise, and Kirsten Dunst. He starred in several major Hollywood films, including the Robert Rodriguez-directed neo-Western action film Desperado (1995), alongside Salma Hayek, Steve Buscemi, and Quentin Tarantino. The film was a financial success. Owen Gleiberman of Entertainment Weekly wrote, "The movie's greatest visual coup ... is Banderas himself. The camera loves this velvet stud as much as it did the young Clint Eastwood."

That same year, Banderas portrayed the antagonist in the Richard Donner-directed action film Assassins, co-starring opposite Sylvester Stallone and Julianne Moore. In 1996, he starred alongside Madonna in the musical film Evita, an adaptation of the stage musical by Andrew Lloyd Webber and Tim Rice in which he played the narrator, Che, a role played by David Essex in the original 1978 West End production. Janet Maslin of The New York Times wrote that "Banderas ... does an unexpectedly splendid job as the film's conspiratorial singing narrator." For his performance, he was nominated for the Golden Globe Award for Best Actor in a Motion Picture – Musical or Comedy. He also had success with his role as the masked swordsman Zorro in the 1998 film The Mask of Zorro, starring Anthony Hopkins and Catherine Zeta-Jones. Roger Ebert praised the onscreen chemistry between the two leads, writing, "The best scenes in the movie are between Banderas and Zeta-Jones, who share chemistry and, it turns out, a sense of justice." His performance earned him another Golden Globe Award nomination. In 1999, he starred in the historical action film The 13th Warrior, a movie about a Muslim caught up in a war between the Northman and human-eating beasts.

=== 2000–2009: Broadway debut and franchise films ===
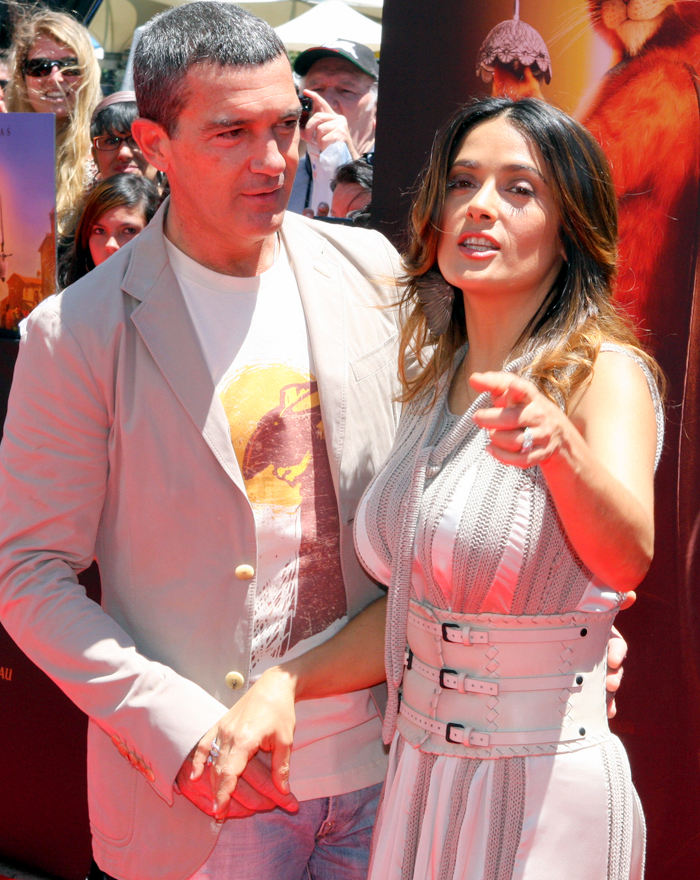
Salma Hayek and Banderas at the premiere of Puss in Boots (2011)

In 2001, Banderas collaborated with Robert Rodriguez, who cast him in the first three movies of the Spy Kids franchise (2001–2003). He portrayed Gregorio Cortez, a retired OSS agent, alongside Carla Gugino, who played his wife, Ingrid Cortez. Roger Ebert praised the first film, describing it as "giddy with the joy of its invention. It's an exuberant, colorful extravaganza, wall-to-wall with wildly original sets and visual gimmicks, and smart enough to escape the kids film category and play in the mainstream." He also starred in Michael Cristofer's Original Sin alongside Angelina Jolie the same year.

In 2002, he portrayed social realist painter David Alfaro Siqueiros in Julie Taymor's biographical drama Frida, with Salma Hayek playing Frida Kahlo. That same year, he starred in Brian De Palma's erotic thriller Femme Fatale opposite Rebecca Romijn, and in 2003, he starred in the last installment of the trilogy Once Upon a Time in Mexico (in which he appeared with Johnny Depp and Hayek). Banderas's debut as a director was the poorly received Crazy in Alabama (1999), starring his then wife Melanie Griffith. He starred in the Christopher Hampton-directed historical drama Imagining Argentina (2003) alongside Emma Thompson.

Banderas made his Broadway debut playing Guido Contini in the 2003 revival of Maury Yeston's musical Nine, based on the film 8½, playing the prime role originated by Raul Julia. Ben Brantley, the chief theater critic of The New York Times, wrote that Banderas was "a bona fide matinee idol for the 21st century -- a pocket Adonis who suggests a more sensitive, less menacing variation on the Latin lovers of yore," adding that "he has an appealingly easy stage presence and an agreeable singing voice that shifts, a bit abruptly, between pop whisperiness and Broadway belting." He won both the Outer Critics Circle Award and the Drama Desk Award for Best Actor in a Musical and was nominated for the Tony Award for Best Actor in a Musical. His performance is preserved on the Broadway cast recording released by PS Classics. Later that year, he received the Rita Moreno HOLA Award for Excellence from the Hispanic Organization of Latin Actors.

Also in 2003, he starred as Mexican revolutionary Pancho Villa in the HBO television film And Starring Pancho Villa as Himself. Banderas acted alongside Alan Arkin, Jim Broadbent, and Michael McKean. The film was directed by Bruce Beresford and written by Larry Gelbart. Phil Gallo of Variety wrote, "Villa was larger than life, and Banderas vibrantly captures his bravado. Everything in the telepic, though, is designed to make Villa a likable force, which pushes and pulls Banderas in a number of directions, only some of which play well. Eventually, 'Villa' exposes a dark side in the man, and Banderas forsakes crafting the image of a hero to allow the man's ambiguity to shine." Banderas was nominated for the Primetime Emmy Award for Outstanding Lead Actor in a Limited or Anthology Series or Movie and the Golden Globe Award for Best Actor – Miniseries or Television Film for his performance.

The following year, Banderas portrayed Puss in Boots in the DreamWorks animated film Shrek 2 (2004). Todd McCarthy of Variety praised his performance, writing that he is "deliciously sending up his Zorro persona." The film was an immense box office and critical hit. It went on to receive a nomination for the Academy Award for Best Animated Feature. Banderas reprised his role in Shrek the Third (2007) and the last film in the Shrek franchise, Shrek Forever After (2010), which helped make the character popular on the family film circuit. In all of his mainline appearances as Puss in Boots, he has also voiced him in Spanish; this is also true for the film Assassins. In 2005, he reprised his role as Zorro in The Legend of Zorro. In 2006, he starred in Take the Lead, a high-set movie in which he played a ballroom dancing teacher. That year, he directed his second film, El camino de los ingleses, based on the novel by Antonio Soler, and also received the L.A. Latino International Film Festival's "Gabi" Lifetime Achievement Award on 14 October. Banderas received a star on the Hollywood Walk of Fame in 2005, the 2,294th person to do so; his star is located on the north side of the 6800 block of Hollywood Boulevard.

=== 2010–present: Reunion with Almodóvar ===
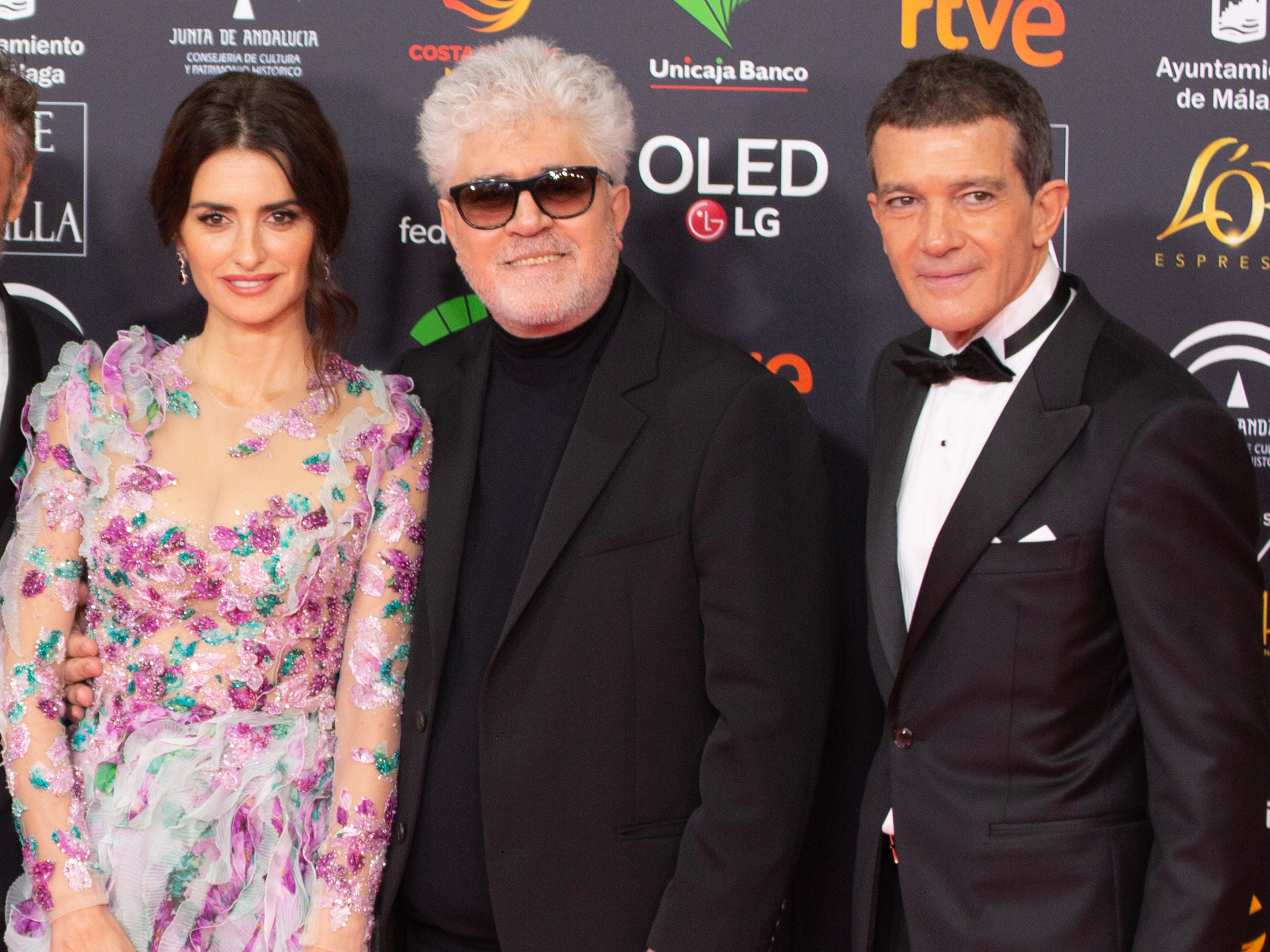
Penélope Cruz, Pedro Almodóvar and Banderas promoting Pain and Glory (2019)

Banderas acted in the Woody Allen-directed comedy-drama You Will Meet a Tall Dark Stranger (2010), starring Anthony Hopkins, Josh Brolin, and Naomi Watts. The film premiered at the Cannes Film Festival and received mixed reviews. The following year, he starred in the horror thriller The Skin I Live In (2011), which marked the return of Banderas to Pedro Almodóvar, the Spanish director who launched his international career. The two had not worked together since 1990 (Tie Me Up! Tie Me Down!). In The Skin I Live In, he breaks out of the "Latin lover" mold from his Hollywood work and stars as a calculating revenge-seeking plastic surgeon following the rape of his daughter. According to the Associated Press, Banderas's performance is among his strongest in recent memory. That same year, he reprised his voice role as Puss in Boots, this time as the protagonist of the Shrek spin-off prequel, Puss in Boots. This film reunited Banderas with Salma Hayek for the sixth time. The film received critical acclaim and was a box-office hit.

Banderas took a small role in Almodóvar's comedy I'm So Excited! (2013) and also acted in Steven Soderbergh's action thriller Haywire (2011), Jonathan Dayton and Valerie Faris's romance fantasy Ruby Sparks (2012), and Terrence Malick's experimental drama Knight of Cups (2015). Banderas starred in The SpongeBob Movie: Sponge Out of Water as Burger Beard, the film's main antagonist. In 2018, Banderas starred in the National Geographic limited series Genius: Picasso as the noted sculptor and painter Pablo Picasso. For his performance, he received a Primetime Emmy Award, a Screen Actors Guild Award, and a Golden Globe Award nomination. He also acted in Life Itself (2018), which premiered at the Toronto International Film Festival.

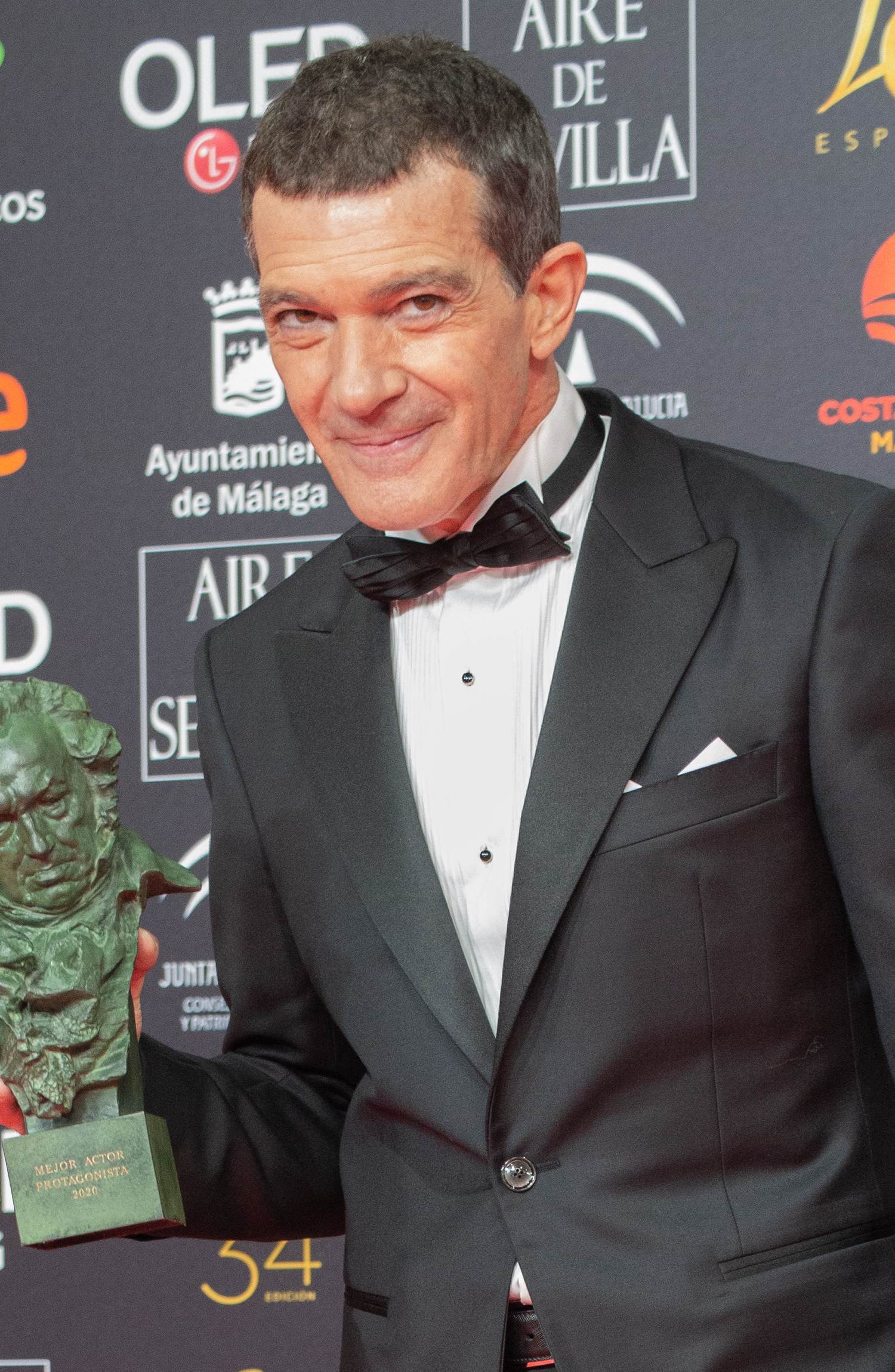
Banderas won the Goya Award for Best Actor for his role in Pain and Glory (2019)

In 2019, Banderas starred in the Spanish film Pain and Glory (Dolor y gloria), directed by Pedro Almodóvar. The film centers around an aging film director played by Banderas who has a chronic illness and writer's block as he reflects on his life in flashbacks to his childhood. On 25 May 2019, Banderas won the Cannes Film Festival Award for Best Actor for his role in the film. Manohla Dargis of The New York Times praised his performance, writing that "Banderas's melancholic presence and subtle, intricate performance add depth and intensities of feeling ... because he draws so flawlessly from Almodóvar." He was later nominated for his first ever Academy Award for Best Actor in a Leading Role for Pain and Glory and lost to Joaquin Phoenix for his role in Joker (2019).

That same year, Banderas starred in Steven Soderbergh's Netflix film The Laundromat alongside Meryl Streep and Gary Oldman. During this time, he starred in Spanish-language adaptations of the musicals A Chorus Line (2019) and Company (2021) at the Teatro del Soho CaixaBank in Spain. In 2020, he co-starred with Robert Downey Jr. in the fantasy adventure film Dolittle. The following year, he starred in the black comedy Official Competition alongside Penélope Cruz, which had its world premiere at the 78th Venice International Film Festival. The film is a meta-comedy and satire on the film industry. A. O. Scott of The New York Times wrote, "Banderas ... can be marvelously subtle and affecting as well as magnetic. It's almost indecent for someone so beautiful to possess such skill, and you might have to go back to the old days—to Gary Cooper—to find a matinee idol with equivalent gifts."

In 2022, Banderas appeared as Santiago Moncada, the antagonist of the film Uncharted with Tom Holland and Mark Wahlberg. He also returned to work for DreamWorks Animation, reprising his voice as Puss in Boots in the sequel Puss in Boots: The Last Wish with Hayek again and a new cast with Florence Pugh, Olivia Colman, Ray Winstone, and Wagner Moura. In 2023, he appeared in Indiana Jones and the Dial of Destiny with Harrison Ford, Mads Mikkelsen, Phoebe Waller-Bridge and Toby Jones . He also portrayed Herod in the Christmas musical film Journey to Bethlehem.

In June 2023, it was announced that Banderas was cast in Paddington in Peru in the role of Hunter Cabot. Other co-stars include Hugh Bonneville, Emily Mortimer, Olivia Colman, and Jim Broadbent. He starred opposite Nicole Kidman in the A24 erotic thriller Babygirl, directed by Halina Reijn.

=== New stage as theater producer ===
Antonio Banderas has always declared that what makes him happiest is theater. On 15 November 2019, his theater project, the Teatro del Soho CaixaBank, opened its doors in Málaga. It is a creation center dedicated to the production, exhibition and distribution of shows, and training in the different areas of the performing arts.

Beginning in 2024, Banderas has also sponsored a new performing arts school in Málaga, the Sohrlin Andalucía School of Arts. The school is located on an old metallurgical factory and its objective is to become a centre in which to design, create and export Andalusian talent to the world.

== Personal life ==
He is a longtime supporter of Málaga CF. In May 2010, Banderas received an honorary doctorate from the University of Málaga. He received an honorary degree from Dickinson College in 2000.

In August 2015, Banderas enrolled in a fashion-design course at Central Saint Martins. As of 2016, Banderas resided in the United Kingdom in Cobham, Surrey.

=== Religious beliefs ===
Banderas once described himself as an agnostic in an interview with People magazine in 2006: "I have to recognize that I am agnostic. I don't believe in any kind of fundamentalism. I prefer to take life in a different way, with a sense of humor. I try to teach my kids to be open. Whatever they believe is fine with me." He does describe himself close to Catholic spirituality, especially to Holy Week, which he considers a "metaphor for life". He is an officer (mayordomo de trono) of a religious brotherhood in his hometown of Málaga and travels during Holy Week to take part in the processions. Banderas redeveloped his relationship with Catholicism back in 1994 after a spiritual search.

"There was a moment in my life in which I separated a bit from the Church. I was searching for a spiritual connection in other places, until in 1994, after my brother had a surgery we were very afraid of, in which we could lose him, I realized I should have not searched for so much, that I had had always that connection with the transcendental in front of my face. It also happened in a way which followed our own traditions, which we shouldn't look for in the Buddha, as these characters were right there. In my own neighborhood was that way to connect myself to the transcendental through the Passion of the Christ, until concluding in Resurrection."

In 2021, he described his religious beliefs and vision of the Holy Week to El País:

"I live comfortably in the mystery, I'm very doubting, I don't know if agnostic is exactly the word. But I think yes, there is something, although we don't know what is it. The Big Bang, yes, and before the Big Bang, what? Holy Week has many colors, it's a very strange polyhedron [a multifaceted thing]. It is related to faith, popular religion and Andalusian idiosyncrasy. It's just the Roman Ides of March: winter dies and spring is born. The Andalusian version is so colourful and merry because everybody knows the guy will resurrect on Sunday. And there is a happy ending."

=== Relationships ===
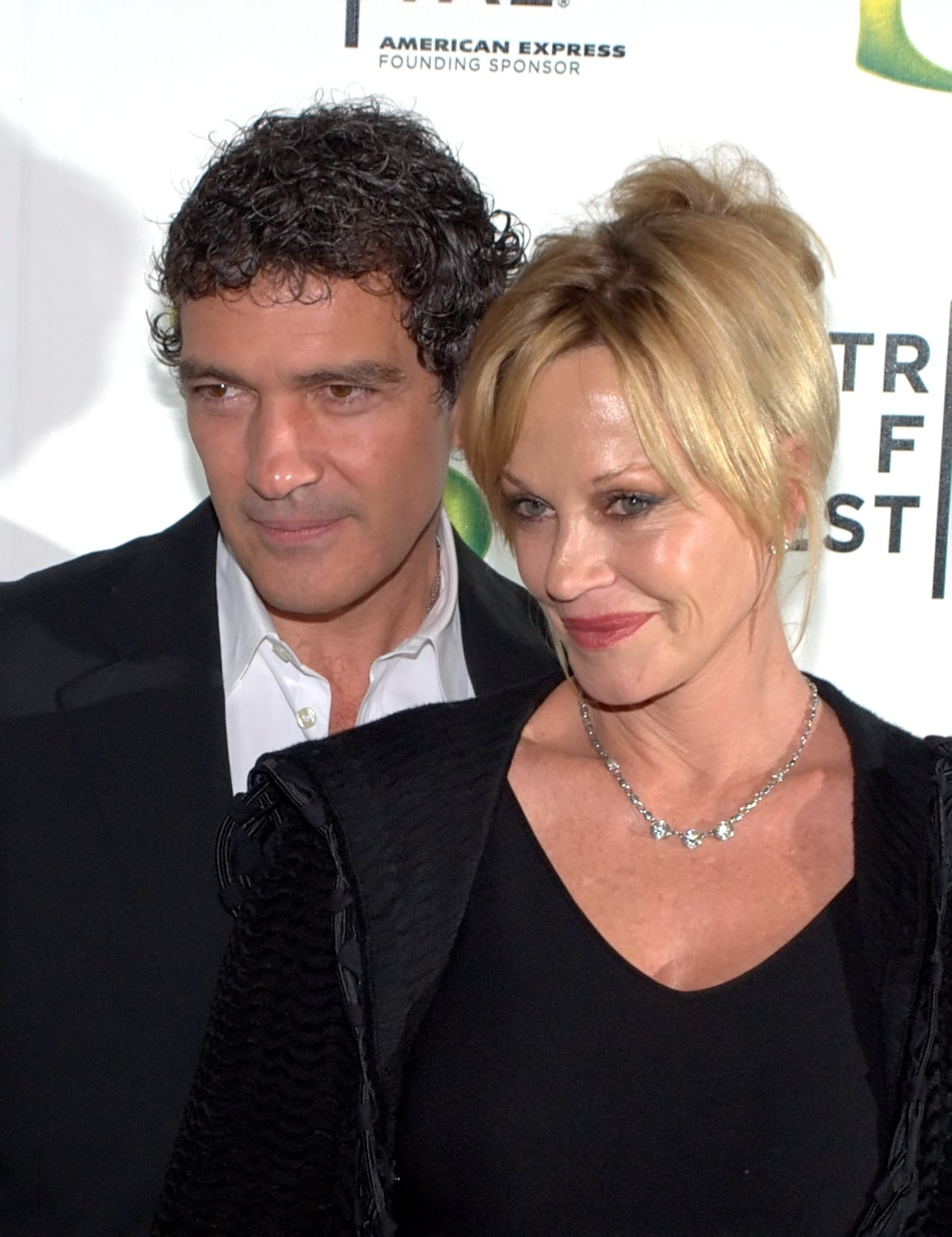
Banderas with then-wife Melanie Griffith in 2010

Banderas married Ana Leza in 1987 and divorced her in 1996. He met and began a relationship with American actress Melanie Griffith in 1995 while shooting Two Much. They married on 14 May 1996, in London. They have a daughter, Stella del Carmen Banderas (born 24 September 1996), who appeared onscreen with Griffith in Banderas's directorial debut Crazy in Alabama (1999). In 2002, the couple received the Stella Adler Angel Award for their extensive philanthropy. Griffith had a tattoo of Banderas's name on her right arm that has since been removed.

In June 2014, Banderas and Griffith announced they were divorcing "in a loving and friendly manner," despite "irreconcilable differences." The divorce became official in December 2015. Despite their divorce, Banderas and Griffith remain close friends; his former stepdaughter Dakota Johnson considers Banderas part of the family, calling him a "bonus dad." As of November 2015, Banderas is dating Nicole Kimpel, an investment banker.

=== Health ===
In 2009, Banderas underwent surgery for a benign tumor in his back. Speaking at the Málaga Film Festival in March 2017, Banderas revealed he had suffered a heart attack on 26 January 2017, but said it "wasn't serious and hasn't caused any damages." Following that incident, he underwent heart surgery to insert three stents into his arteries. In a Fresh Air interview in September 2019, he recalled it as being life-changing. He said, "It just gave me a perspective of who I was, and it just made the important things [go to] the surface. When I say this, people may just think that I'm crazy, but it's one of the best things that ever happened in my life."

=== Business ventures ===
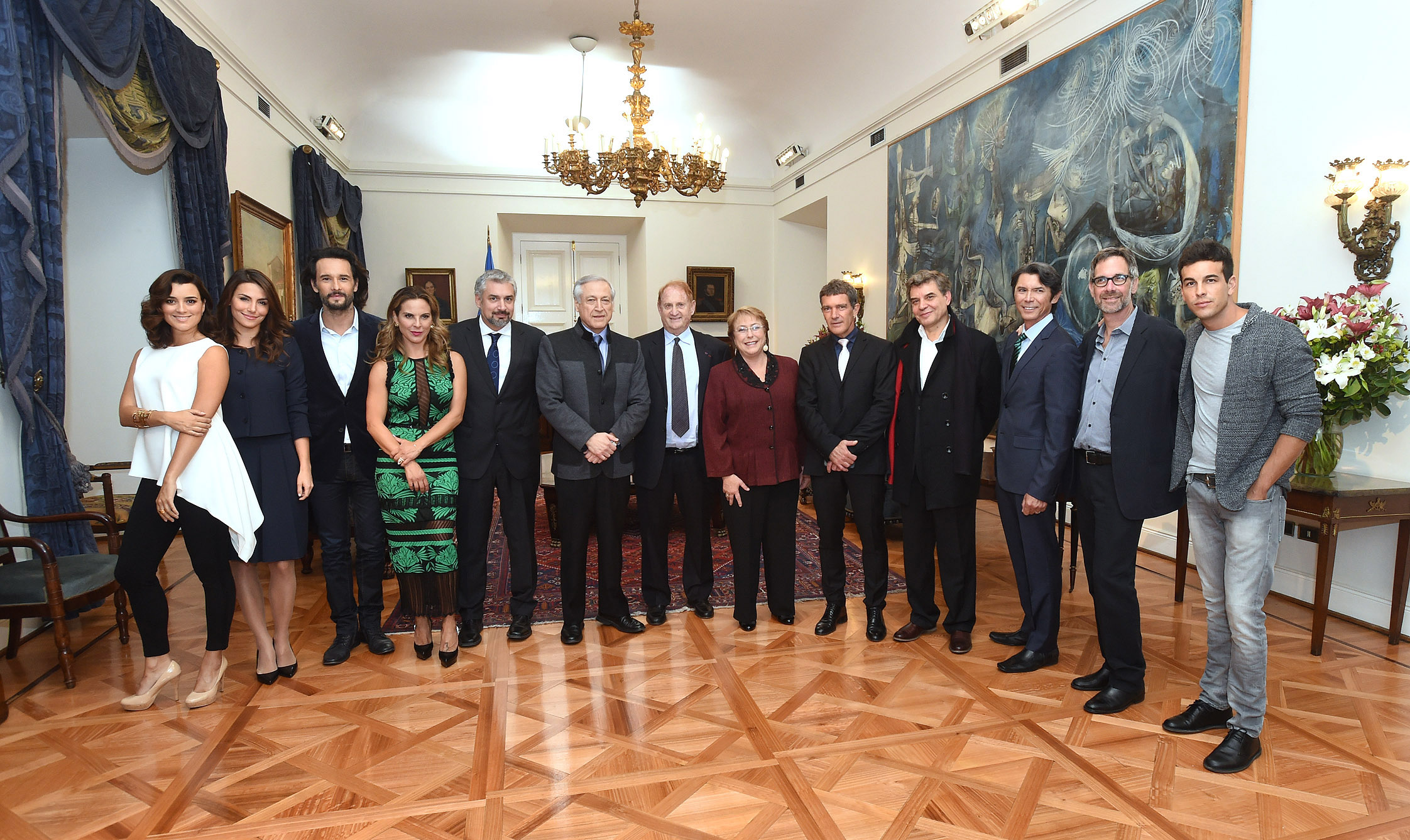
Banderas (center right) with members of The 33 and Chile government officials in 2015

He has invested some of his film earnings in Andalusian products, which he promotes in Spain and the US. He owns 50% of a winery in Villalba de Duero, Burgos, Spain, called Anta Banderas, which produces red and rosé wines.

He performed a voice-over for an animated bee, which was broadcast in the United States in television commercials for Nasonex, an allergy medication, and was seen in the 2007 Christmas advertising campaign for Marks & Spencer, a British retailer.

He is a veteran of the perfume industry. The actor has been working with fragrance and beauty multinational company Puig for over ten years, becoming one of the brand's most successful representatives. Banderas and Puig have successfully promoted a number of fragrances so far: Diavolo, Diavolo for Women, Mediterraneo, Spirit, and Spirit for Women. After the success of Antonio for Men and Blue Seduction for Men in 2007, he launched his latest, Blue Seduction for Women, the following year.

== Acting credits and accolades ==
Banderas has received many award nominations throughout his career, including an Academy Award nomination for Pain and Glory. He also received five Golden Globe Award nominations for his work ranging from films to television. He has also received two Primetime Emmy Award nominations for his work, on the television projects And Starring Pancho Villa as Himself (2004) and Genius: Picasso (2018). He also received a Screen Actors Guild Award nomination for his performance as Pablo Picasso in Genius: Picasso. In 2003, he received a Tony Award nomination for Best Actor in a Musical for his performance in the Broadway musical production of Nine. That year, however, he did win the Drama Desk Award for Outstanding Actor in a Musical for his performance in Nine. In 2019, he won the Cannes Film Festival Award for Best Actor, the European Film Award for Best Actor, the Goya Award for Best Actor, and the New York Film Critics Circle Award for Best Actor for his performance in Almodovar's Pain and Glory.

== See also ==
- List of actors with Hollywood Walk of Fame motion picture stars
- List of celebrities who own wineries and vineyards
