= Paco Sagarzazu =

Spanish actor (born 1940)

- Born: Francisco Sagarzazu Badiola; 31 January 1940 (age 86); San Sebastián, Spain
- Occupation: Actor
- Years active: 1981–present

Francisco Sagarzazu Badiola (born 31 January 1940), better known as Paco Sagarzazu, is a Spanish actor. He appeared in more than sixty films since 1981.

== Selected filmography ==
Year	Title	Role	Notes
2003	Mortadelo & Filemon: The Big Adventure	The President	
2011	The Last Circus	Anselmo	
