= Matador (film) =

1986 film by Pedro Almodóvar

- Theatrical release poster by Carlos Berlanga
- Directed by: Pedro Almodóvar
- Screenplay by: Jesús Ferrero; Pedro Almodóvar
- Story by: Pedro Almodóvar
- Produced by: Andrés Vicente Gómez
- Starring: Assumpta Serna; Antonio Banderas; Nacho Martínez
- Cinematography: Ángel Luis Fernández
- Edited by: Pepe Salcedo
- Music by: Bernardo Bonezzi
- Production companies: Compañía Iberoamericana de TV; Televisión Española
- Distributed by: Iberoamericana Distribución
- Release date: 7 March 1986 (Spain)
- Running time: 106 minutes
- Country: Spain
- Language: Spanish
- Box office: $286,126

Matador is a 1986 Spanish erotic thriller film co-written and directed by Pedro Almodóvar about a student matador, Ángel Giménez (Antonio Banderas), who confesses to murders he did not commit.

== Plot ==
Diego Montes is a former bullfighter, forced into early retirement after being gored, who finds sexual gratification by viewing slasher films. Among the students in Diego's bullfighting class is Ángel, a diffident young man who suffers from vertigo. During one episode of vertigo in the practice ring, Ángel has a vision of a woman killing a man during sex with an ornamental silver hairpin, stabbing at the base of the neck as a matador kills a bull. After class, Diego asks Ángel whether he is homosexual, noting that he is not experienced with women. Ángel says he is not and vows to prove himself. Later that day, Ángel follows Diego's girlfriend, Eva, to a neighborhood alley, making a fumbling attempt to rape her. When Ángel shows shame, a disdainful Eva slaps him. As she leaves, Eva trips in the mud and gashes her cheek. At the sight of her blood, Ángel faints.

Guilt-ridden, Ángel tells his domineering mother that he needs psychotherapy. A member of Opus Dei, she insists he go to mass and confession as a condition of living in her home. Discussion with a priest does not satisfy him; Ángel goes to the police station to confess to rape. When Eva is brought to the station, she dismissively says Ángel ejaculated without penetrating her and declines to press charges. Ángel is as humiliated by the account of his impotence as by being dismissed as harmless. Alone with the police detective, Ángel notices photos of dead men with the same wound administered by the woman in his vision. He confesses to having killed them. The detective then asks about two missing women, who were also students of Diego, and Ángel confesses to killing them as well.

Although Ángel leads the police to the two women's bodies, buried on Diego's property, the detective is not convinced. He questions how Ángel could have buried them there without Diego's knowledge, finds that Ángel has an alibi for one murder, and discovers that Ángel faints at the sight of blood.

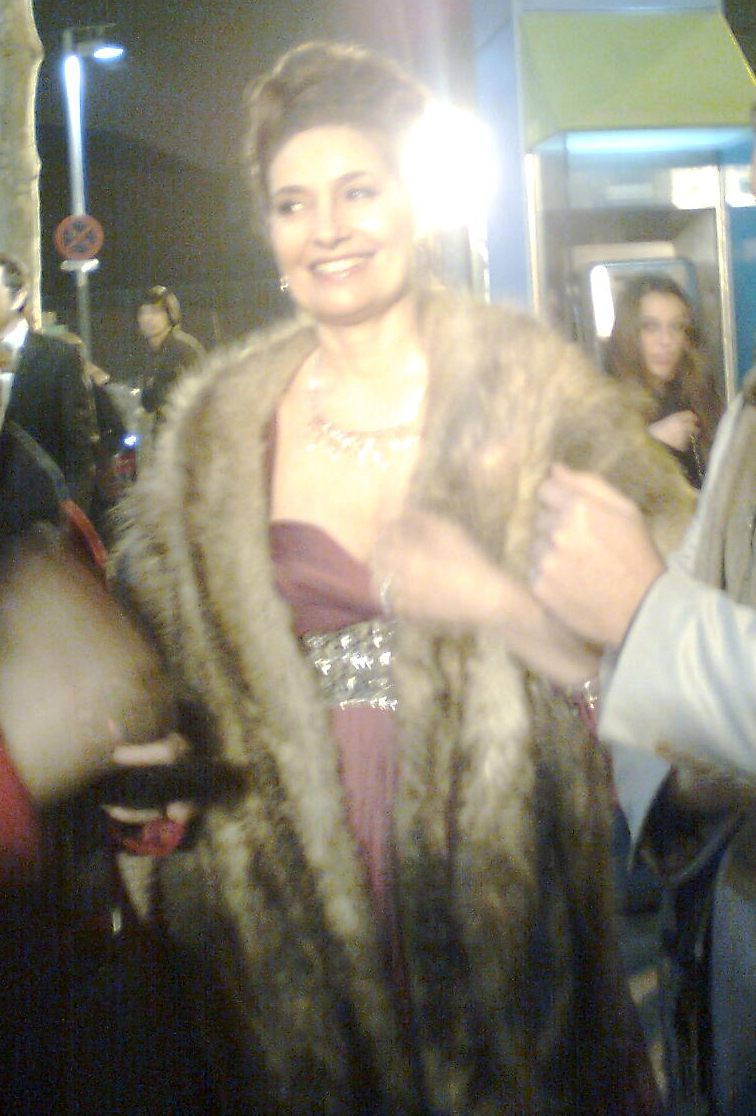
Assumpta Serna plays María Cardenal, a serial killer who kills during sex with an ornamental silver hairpin, stabbing at the base of the neck as a matador kills a bull.

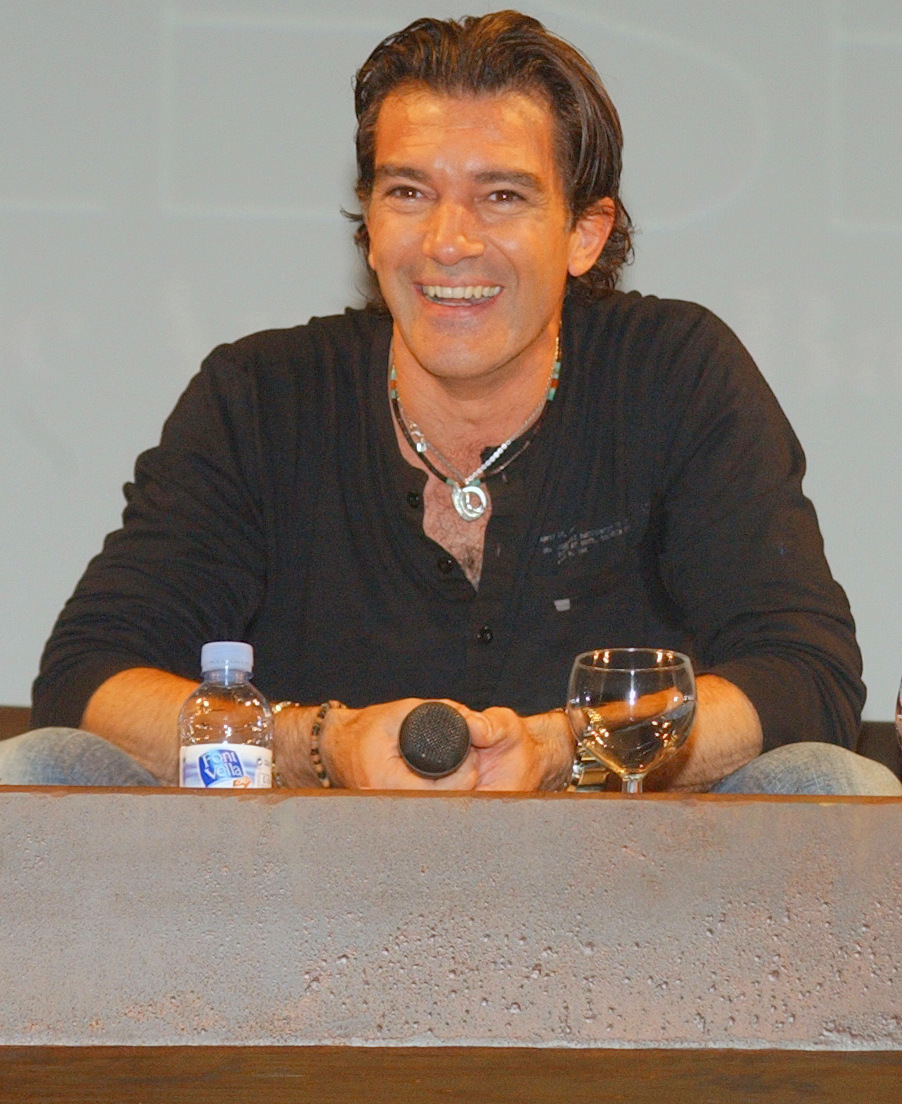
Antonio Banderas plays Ángel, who confesses to murders by two serial killers that he did not commit.

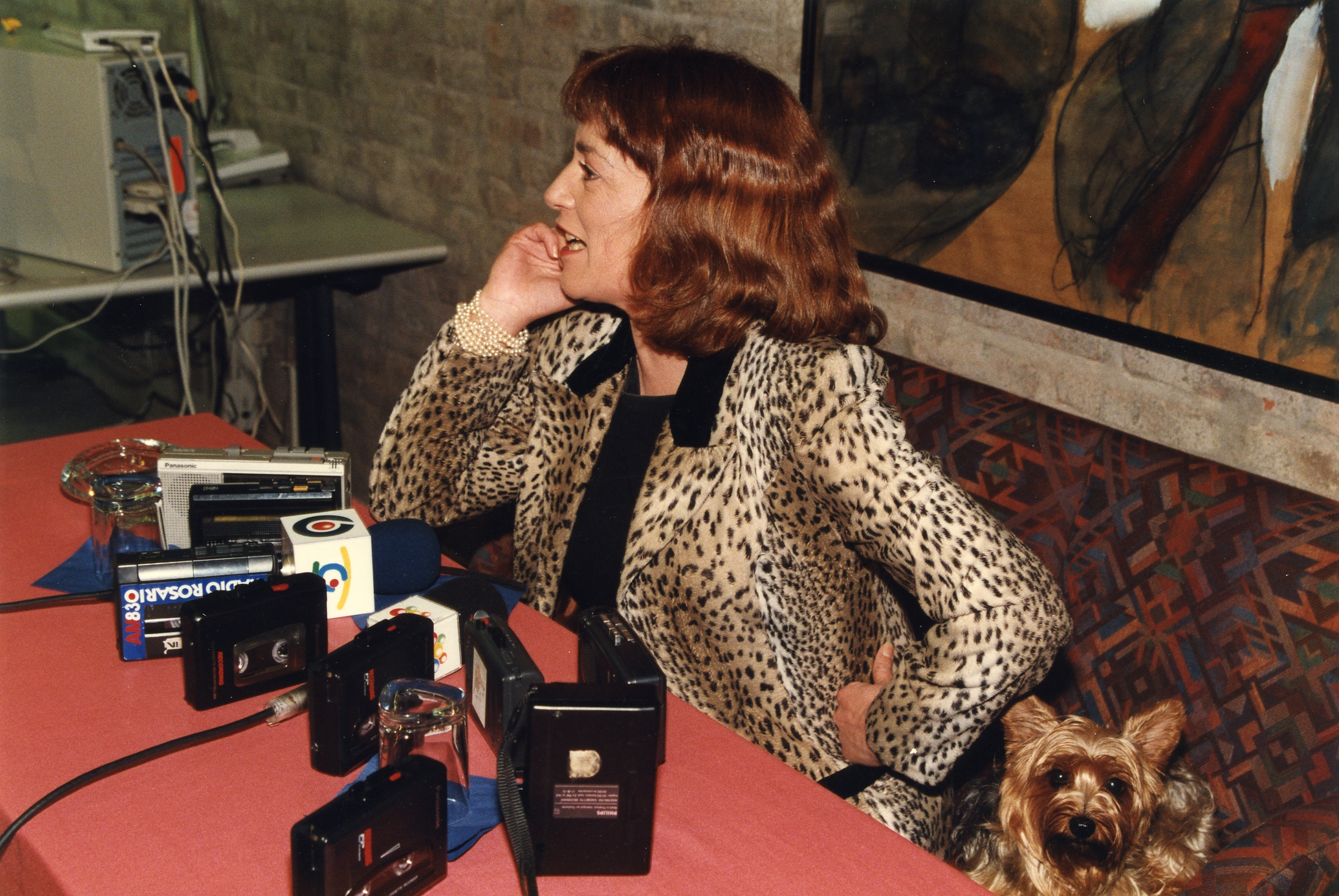
Carmen Maura plays Julia, Ángel's psychiatrist, who tries to protect him from murder charges stemming from his false confessions.

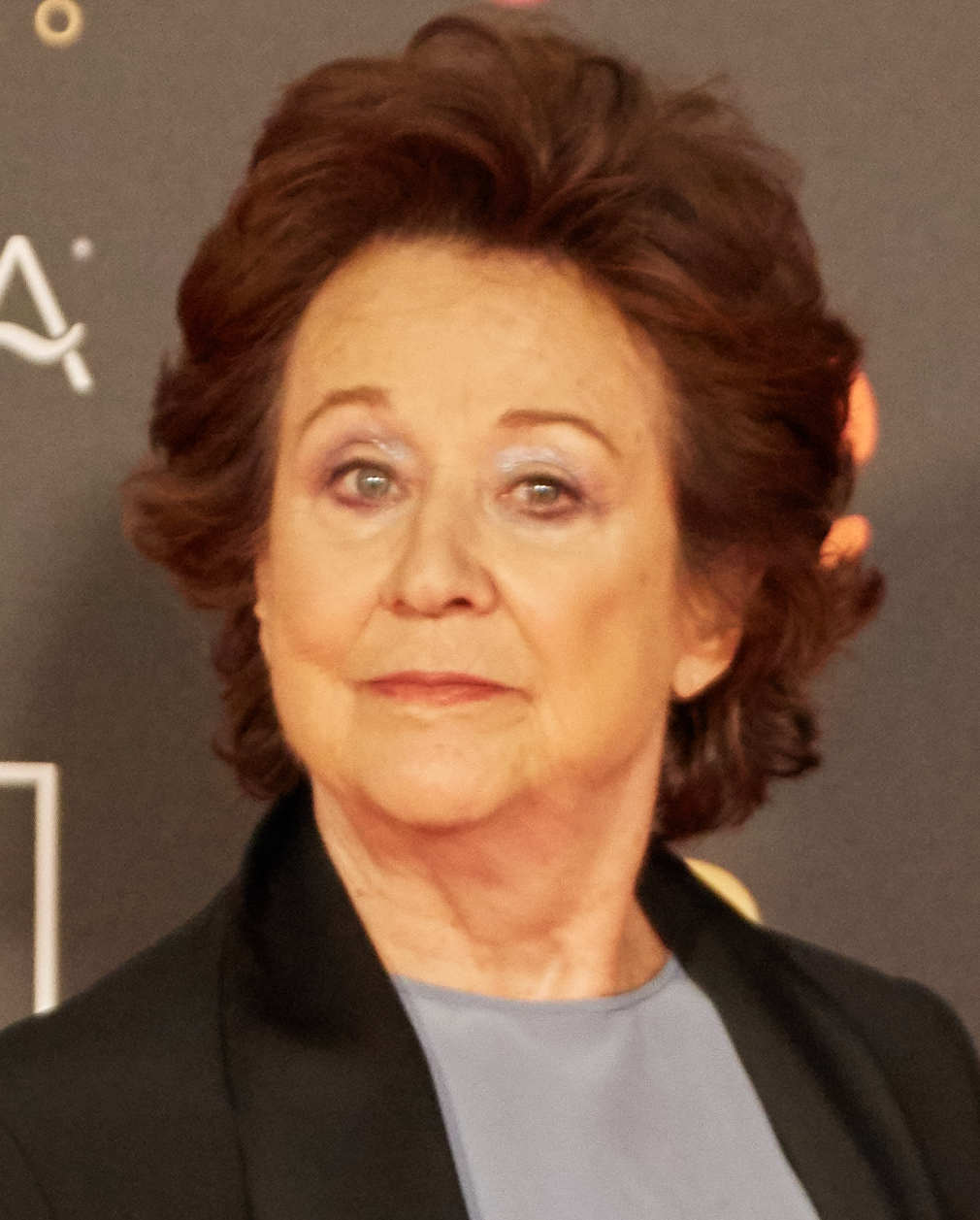
Julieta Serrano plays Berta, Ángel's domineering mother, who tells him to go to mass and confession rather than psychotherapy.

The much younger Eva, desperately in love with Diego, is eager to please him. When they have sex, Diego asks Eva to lie perfectly still and pretend to be dead; she complies without any qualms.

Meanwhile, Ángel's lawyer, María Cardenal, who wears an ornamental silver hairpin—the woman in Ángel's vision—suspects that Diego killed the two women. María sets Ángel up with a psychiatrist and tells him to stop confessing to murders. Aware that Diego is stalking her, María leads him to a secluded warehouse, allowing him to catch her and passionately kiss her. During the kiss, Diego catches María’s hand as she is about to stab with her hairpin. They recognize and acknowledge the killer instinct in each other; both having committed multiple murders the police are investigating. María then takes Diego to her remote home, where she has collected memorabilia related to Diego since she first saw him kill a bull. Later, at Diego's home, Eva eavesdrops and overhears the two set up a “plan,” realizing they are serial killers. When María leaves, Eva tells Diego he must stay with her, since she knows his secret; Diego advises her to forget him, saying he does not want to harm her. Eva then confronts María, warning her away from Diego and threatening to disclose her secret. María scoffs at Eva's threats, saying that Eva cannot possibly satisfy Diego. María then goes to Diego, saying they are running out of time and must carry out their plan immediately.

While Eva is denouncing Diego and María, Ángel's psychiatrist calls to tell the detective that Ángel has seen Diego and María in danger in a trance. Using psychic powers, Ángel guides the police, Ángel, Eva, and the psychiatrist to María's house. Just as they arrive, an eclipse begins, and they hear a gunshot. Quickly entering, they find both María and Diego together, naked and dead. During sex, María stabbed Diego with her hairpin at the base of the neck as she shot herself in the mouth with a pistol. Ángel laments that he could not save Diego, while the detective says the killers look happy.

== Cast ==
- Assumpta Serna as María
- Antonio Banderas as Ángel
- Nacho Martínez as Diego
- Eva Cobo as Eva
- Julieta Serrano as Berta, Ángel's mother
- Chus Lampreave as Pilar, Eva's mother
- Carmen Maura as Julia, Ángel's psychiatrist
- Eusebio Poncela as the police detective
- Bibi Andersen as a flower seller
- Luis Ciges as a guard
- Eva Siva as an assistant to María and Diego
- Verónica Forqué as a journalist
- Jaime Chávarri as a priest
- Angie Gray as Chica Ana
- Agustín Almodóvar as police officer #2
- Concha Hidalgo as Tata Ángel
- Antonio Passy as an otolaryngologist

== Production ==
Pedro Almodóvar said the opening sex scene between Assumpta Serna and Jesús Ruyman was unsimulated.

When he was filming the final scene with Serna, Almodóvar was not sure whether Nacho Martínez, playing the wounded matador who was about to have sex with her, should graze her crotch directly with his mouth or do so with a rosebud between his teeth. Almodóvar tried it out himself. "I realized it was better to put some distance between the actor's tongue and the girl's sex", he said, during an appearance on a Spanish talk show. "I do it all", he added.

== Reception ==
Vincent Canby of The New York Times wrote, "The movie looks terrific and is acted with absolute, straight-faced conviction by the excellent cast headed by Miss Serna, Mr. Martinez and Mr. Banderas. Matador is of most interest as another work in the career of a film maker who, possibly, is in the process of refining a singular talent."

In his 2006 book Almodóvar on Almodóvar, the director admitted that he considered this film and Kika (1993) to be his two weakest.

On the review aggregator website Rotten Tomatoes, Matador holds an approval rating of 93% based on 27 reviews, with an average rating of 7.3/10. The website's critics consensus reads, "Intertwining murder and seduction, Pedro Almodóvar's Matador is a provocative thriller that will shock even the most adventurous moviegoers."
